= 2019 Tajikistan Higher League =

Ligai Olii Tojikiston
- Season: 2019
- Champions: Istiklol
- Relegated: Panjshir
- Matches: 84
- Goals: 251 (2.99 per match)
- Top goalscorer: Sheriddin Boboev (16)
- Biggest home win: Khujand 9-0 Panjshir
- Biggest away win: Kuktosh 1-6 Istiklol
- Highest scoring: Khujand 9-0 Panjshir

The 2019 Ligai Olii Tojikiston (Tajik: 2019 Лигаи Олии Тоҷикистон) or 2019 Tajikistan Higher League was the 28th season of Ligai Olii Tojikiston, Tajikistan's top division of association football. The season began on 6 April 2019. and finished on 4 November 2019.

== Teams ==
On 19 February 2019, the Tajikistan Football Federation announced that the season would involve eight teams, consisting of Istiklol, Khujand, Kuktosh, Regar-TadAZ, Khatlon, CSKA Pamir, Panjshir and newly promoted Istaravshan.

Locations of teams in the 2019 Tajikistan Higher League

Team	Location	Venue	Capacity
CSKA Pamir	Dushanbe	CSKA Stadium	7,000
Istaravshan	Istaravshan	Istaravshan-Arena	20,000
Istiklol	Dushanbe	Central Republican Stadium	24,000
Khatlon	Bokhtar	Central Stadium	
Khujand	Khujand	20-Letie Nezavisimosti Stadium	20,000
Kuktosh	Kuktosh	Rudaki Stadium	
Panjshir	Balkh	Panjshir Uktam Mamatova	8,500
Regar-TadAZ	Tursunzoda	Stadium Metallurg 1st District	20,000

=== Foreign players ===
Each Tajikistan Higher League club is permitted to register six foreign players, with four allowed on the pitch at the same time.

Club	Player 1	Player 2	Player 3	Player 4	Player 5	Player 6	Former
CSKA Pamir Dushanbe	(Ghana) Eiya Edward	(Russia) Yegor Khokhlov	(Russia) Mikhail Zaitsev				
Istaravshan	(Uzbekistan) Jamshed Khasanov	(Uzbekistan) Tulkinjon Umarov					
Istiklol	(Ukraine) Oleksiy Larin						(Armenia) **Ruslan Koryan** (Serbia) Mihajlo Cakić (Uzbekistan) Jalil Kimsanov
Khatlon							
Khujand	(Georgia (country)) Tornike Dzhimsheleishvili	(Georgia (country)) Davit Kupatadze	(Kyrgyzstan) **Tursunali Rustamov**	(Uzbekistan) Asiljon Begimkulov			
Kuktosh Rudaki	(Ghana) Prince Arthur	(Ghana) Misiam Inocent	(Ghana) Ishmael Klotey	(Uzbekistan) Nodirbek Ibragimov	(Uzbekistan) Muhiddin Odilov	(Uzbekistan) Bunyod Shodiev	
Panjshir	(Ghana) Quaye Godson						
Regar-TadAZ	(Iran) Arash Akbari						

In bold: Players that have been capped for their national team.

=== Managerial changes ===
Team	Outgoing manager	Manner of departure	Date of vacancy	Position in table	Incoming manager	Date of appointment
Istiklol	(Tajikistan) Alisher Tukhtaev	End of Contract	31 December 2018	Pre-Season	(Tajikistan) Khakim Fuzailov	31 December 2018
Istaravshan				Pre-Season	(Tajikistan) Tokhirjon Muminov	14 March 2019
CSKA Pamir Dushanbe	(Tajikistan) Rustam Khojayev	Resigned	23 June 2019		(Ukraine) Serhiy Zhytskyi	8 July 2019
Istiklol	(Tajikistan) Khakim Fuzailov	Resigned	27 June 2019	1st	(Tajikistan) Alisher Tukhtaev (Caretaker)	27 June 2019

== League table ==
Pos	Team	Pld	W	D	L	GF	GA	GD	Pts	Qualification or relegation
1	Istiklol (C)	21	16	3	2	60	20	+40	51	Qualification for AFC Champions League preliminary round 2 (Note: If the league champions cannot qualify for the AFC Champions League group stage, they will enter the AFC Cup group stage.)
2	Khujand	21	11	3	7	37	21	+16	36	Qualification for AFC Cup play-off round (Note: Since league champions Istiklol were also Tajikistan Cup winners, the league runners-up qualified for the AFC Cup play-off round.)
3	Regar-TadAZ	21	8	6	7	31	30	+1	30	
4	CSKA Pamir	21	8	5	8	24	27	−3	29	
5	Istaravshan	21	8	3	10	24	32	−8	27 (Note: Head-to-head results: Istaravshan 0–0 Kuktosh, Kuktosh 3–1 Istaravshan, Istaravshan 3–0 Kuktosh.)	
6	Kuktosh	21	7	6	8	31	36	−5	27	
7	Khatlon	21	6	6	9	26	28	−2	24	Qualification for Relegation play-offs
8	Panjshir (R)	21	3	2	16	18	57	−39	11	Relegation to Tajik First Division

Source: FFT
Rules for classification: 1) Points; 2) Head-to-head points; 3) Head-to-head goal difference; 4) Head-to-head goals scored; 5) Goal difference; 6) Goals scored.
(C) Champions; (R) Relegated

== Results ==
=== Results 1–14 ===
Home \ Away	CPD	ISA	IST	KHA	KJD	KUK	PAN	RZD
CSKA Pamir	—	0–1	1–4	0–0	2–1	3–2	0–1	2–3
Istaravshan	1–2	—	0–1	1–2	2–1	0–0	3–2	2–1
Istiklol	3–0	4–0	—	3–1	2–1	0–0	2–0	4–1
Khatlon	0–1	2–1	2–2	—	2–0	0–1	2–1	2–2
Khujand	1–1	3–1	0–3	1–0	—	2–1	9–0	3–1
Kuktosh	2–0	3–1	2–2	2–0	0–2	—	3–1	3–4
Panjshir	0–2	2–1	1–5	1–3	0–0	1–1	—	0–1
Regar-TadAZ	1–1	0–0	2–3	1–1	0–1	3–0	2–0	—

Updated to match(es) played on 24 October 2019. Source: Soccerway
Legend: Blue = home team win; Yellow = draw; Red = away team win.

=== Results 15–21 ===
Home \ Away	CPD	ISA	IST	KHA	KJD	KUK	PAN	RZD
CSKA Pamir	—	—	3–2	—	—	1–1	2–0	—
Istaravshan	1–0	—	—	1–1	—	3–0	3–0	—
Istiklol	—	2–0	—	5–0	2–1	—	—	1–2
Khatlon	1–2	—	—	—	1–2	—	4–0	—
Khujand	0–0	0–1	—	—	—	—	—	1–0
Kuktosh	—	—	1–6	2–1	2–3	—	—	0–0
Panjshir	—	—	2–4	—	0–5	3–5	—	—
Regar-TadAZ	2–1	5–2	—	0–0	—	—	6–1	—

Updated to match(es) played on 4 November 2019. Source: Soccerway
Legend: Blue = home team win; Yellow = draw; Red = away team win.

=== Results by round ===
Team ╲ Round	1	2	3	4	5	6	7	8	9	10	11	12	13	14	15	16	17	18	19	20	21
CSKA Pamir	L	L	D	D	W	L	L	D	L	L	W	W	W	W	L	D	L	W	D	W	W
Istaravshan	L	W	L	L	L	D	D	L	W	W	L	L	W	W	L	D	W	L	L	W	W
Istiklol	W	W	D	W	W	W	W	W	W	W	W	D	W	W	D	W	W	L	W	W	L
Khatlon	L	L	W	D	D	L	W	W	L	D	L	W	L	W	D	W	D	L	L	L	D
Khujand	W	L	D	W	W	D	L	L	W	W	W	L	L	W	W	W	W	D	W	L	L
Kuktosh	W	L	D	W	L	W	D	W	W	L	D	D	L	L	L	D	L	L	W	D	W
Panjshir	W	W	L	L	L	D	L	L	L	L	D	L	L	L	L	L	L	L	L	L	L
Regar-TadAZ	L	W	W	L	D	D	W	D	L	D	L	W	W	L	W	L	W	W	W	D	D

W = Win; D = Draw; L = Loss

=== Position by round ===
Team ╲ Round	1	2	3	4	5	6	7	8	9	10	11	12	13	14	15	16	17	18	19	20	21
CSKA Pamir	7	8	8	8	7	7	7	7	8	8	7	6	5	6	6	6	5	5	5	4	4
Istaravshan	5	4	6	7	8	8	8	8	6	6	6	7	7	7	7	7	6	7	7	6	5
Istiklol	1	1	1	1	1	1	1	1	1	1	1	1	1	1	1	1	1	1	1	1	1
Khatlon	6	7	7	6	6	6	5	4	5	5	5	5	6	5	5	3	3	4	4	7	7
Khujand	4	5	4	2	2	2	4	5	2	2	2	2	2	2	2	2	2	2	2	2	2
Kuktosh	2	6	5	3	3	3	2	2	3	3	3	3	3	3	4	4	7	7	6	5	6
Panjshir	3	2	3	5	5	5	6	6	7	7	8	8	8	8	8	8	8	8	8	8	8
Regar-TadAZ	8	3	2	4	4	4	3	3	4	4	4	4	4	4	3	5	4	3	3	3	3

Leader / Qualification for AFC Champions League preliminary round 1
Standby team for AFC Cup group stage
Qualification for Relegation play-offs
Relegation to Tajik First Division

=== Matches ===
==== Week 1 ====
6 April 2019	Kuktosh	2 – 0	CSKA Pamir Dushanbe	Rudaki
(UTC+5)	Abdurasul Rakhmonov 55', 83'	Report		Stadium: Oilfield stadium Attendance: 7,000; Referee: Halim Shirzad

6 April 2019	Panjshir	2 – 1	Istaravshan	Kolkhozobod
(UTC+5)	Tulkindzhon Umarov 43' (o.g.); Sobirjon Kholmatov 90+2' (pen.)	Report	Bakhtovar Zokirov 3'	Stadium: Panjshir Uktam Mamatova; Attendance: 3,200; Referee: Nasrullo Kabirov

7 April 2019	Istiklol	4 – 1	Regar-TadAZ	Vahdat
(UTC+5)	Fatkhuloev 5' (pen.), 31'; Panjshanbe 62' (pen.); Boboev 87'	Report	Sherzod Makhamadiev 30'	Stadium: Central Stadium; Attendance: 2,000; Referee: Slim Turdyev

7 April 2019	Khujand	1 – 0	Khatlon	Khujand
(UTC+5)	J.Ergashev 58' (pen.)	Report		Stadium: 20 Years of Independence Stadium; Attendance: 2,500; Referee: Abdurashid Murodov

==== Week 2 ====
11 April 2019	Istiklol	3 – 1	Khatlon	Dushanbe
(UTC+5)	Dzhalilov 8'; Boboev 45+1'; A.Barotov 56' (o.g.)	Report	Hudoydod Uzokov 63'	Stadium: Pamir Stadium; Referee: Abdullo Davlatov

11 April 2019	Istaravshan	2 – 1	Khujand	Istaravshan
(UTC+5)	Bakhtovar Zokirov 27', 45+1'	Report	Ahmadov 39'	Stadium: Central Stadium; Attendance: 15,000; Referee: Sayvali Turdiev

13 April 2019	CSKA Pamir Dushanbe	0 – 1	Panjshir	Dushanbe
(UTC+5)		Report	Sobirjon Kholmatov 40'	Stadium: CSKA Stadium; Attendance: 2,750; Referee: Hurshed Dadadoev

14 April 2019	Regar-TadAZ	3 – 0	Kuktosh	Tursunzoda
(UTC+5)	Rustamov 20'; Alisher Kholmurodov 45+3'; Babadjanov 47'	Report		Stadium: TALCO Arena; Attendance: 3,000; Referee: Sayojon Zainiddinov

==== Week 3 ====
21 April 2019	Panjshir	0 – 1	Regar-TadAZ	Kolkhozobod
(UTC+5)		Report	Babadjanov 70'	Stadium: Panjshir Uktam Mamatova; Attendance: 3,500; Referee: Khusrawi Siddikzod

21 April 2019	Khujand	1 – 1	CSKA Pamir Dushanbe	Khujand
(UTC+5)	Asiljon Begimkulov 80'	Report	Sharafjon Solekhov 57'	Stadium: 20 Years of Independence Stadium; Attendance: 1,500; Referee: Nasrullo Kabirov

21 April 2019	Khatlon	2 – 1	Istaravshan	Qurghonteppa
(UTC+5)	Saidov 14'; Ravshan Azizov 48'	Report	Firuz Karaev 62' (pen.)	Stadium: Central Stadium; Attendance: 2,000; Referee: Gulmurodi Sadullo

22 April 2019	Kuktosh	2 – 2	Istiklol	Rudaki
(UTC+5)	Muhiddin Odilov 4', 10'	Report	Samiyev 31'; Fatkhuloev 88' (pen.)	Stadium: Oilfield Stadium; Attendance: 7,500; Referee: Abdurashid Murodov

==== Week 4 ====
25 April 2019	Khujand	3 – 1	Regar-TadAZ	Khujand
(UTC+5)	Rustamov 2'; Erghashev 7'; Dilshod Bozorov 39'	Report	Babadjanov 60'	Stadium: 20 Years of Independence Stadium; Attendance: 4,500; Referee: Sayojon Zainiddinov

26 April 2019	Istiklol	4 – 0	Istaravshan	Dushanbe
(UTC+5)	Rakhimov 1'; Panjshanbe 57'; A.Dzhalilov 68'; Samiyev 72'	Report		Stadium: Pamir Stadium; Attendance: 450; Referee: Behruz Murtazoev

27 April 2019	Kuktosh	3 – 1	Panjshir	Rudaki
(UTC+5)	Muhsin Abdugafforov 8', 83' (pen.); Holmurod Nazarov 17'	Report	Makhmadrajab Jobirov 40'	Stadium: Oilfield Stadium; Attendance: 6,000; Referee: Sayvali Turdiev

27 April 2019	CSKA Pamir Dushanbe	0 – 0	Khatlon	Dushanbe
(UTC+5)		Report		Stadium: CSKA Stadium; Attendance: 500; Referee: Khusrawi Siddikzod

==== Week 5 ====
4 May 2019	Panjshir	1 – 5	Istiklol	Kolkhozobod
(UTC+5)	Saidjon Sharipov 75'	Report	Rakhimov 17'; Boboev 25'; Jalil Kimsanov 29'; A.Dzhalilov 33'; Nazarov 60'	Stadium: Panjshir Uktam Mamatova; Attendance: 4,000; Referee: Abdullo Davlatov

4 May 2019	Khujand	2 – 1	Kuktosh	Khujand
(UTC+5)	Rustamov 38'; Dilshod Bozorov 65'	Report	Amirjon Safarov 82'	Stadium: 20 Years of Independence Stadium; Attendance: 5,200; Referee: Behruz Murtazoev

4 May 2019	Khatlon	2 – 2	Regar-TadAZ	Qurghonteppa
(UTC+5)	Abduhalil Boronov 79'; Nuriddin Hamrokulov 90+5'	Report	Rustamov 6'; Alisher Kholmurodov 57'	Stadium: Central Stadium; Attendance: 2,000; Referee: Hurshed Dadadoev

4 May 2019	Istaravshan	1 – 2	CSKA Pamir Dushanbe	Istaravshan
(UTC+5)	Bakhtovar Zokirov 90+2'	Report	Daler Yodgorov 67'; Sharafjon Solekhov 13'	Stadium: Central Stadium; Attendance: 10,000; Referee: Abdurashid Murodov

==== Week 6 ====
9 May 2019	CSKA Pamir Dushanbe	1 – 4	Istiklol	Dushanbe
(UTC+5)	Hanonov 82'	Report	Panjshanbe 49', 89'; A.Dzhalilov 76' (pen.); Boboev 90+2'	Stadium: CSKA Stadium; Attendance: 2,000; Referee: Nekruz Umarov

9 May 2019	Panjshir	0 – 0	Khujand	Kolkhozobod
(UTC+5)		Report		Stadium: Panjshir Uktam Mamatova; Attendance: 3,000; Referee: Abdurashid Murodov

11 May 2019	Kuktosh	2 – 0	Khatlon	Rudaki
(UTC+5)	Muhiddin Odilov 25'; Mehrojiddin Muzaffarov 52'	Report		Stadium: Oilfield Stadium; Attendance: 7,000; Referee: Nasrullo Kabirov

11 May 2019	Regar-TadAZ	0 – 0	Istaravshan	Tursunzoda
(UTC+5)		Report		Stadium: TALCO Arena; Attendance: 4,200; Referee: Nekruz Umarov

==== Week 7 ====
18 May 2019	Istaravshan	0 – 0	Kuktosh	Istaravshan
(UTC+5)		Report		Stadium: Central Stadium; Attendance: 8,000; Referee: Abdurashid Murodov

18 May 2019	CSKA Pamir Dushanbe	2 – 3	Regar-TadAZ	Dushanbe
(UTC+5)	Shodibek Gafforov 9', 30'	Report	Sherzod Makhamadiev 6'; Sheldori Akbari Arash 13'; Babadjanov 61'	Stadium: CSKA Stadium; Attendance: 500; Referee: Behruz Murtazoev

19 May 2019	Khujand	0 – 3	Istiklol	Khujand
(UTC+5)		Report	Asiljon Begimkulov 31' (o.g.); Panjshanbe 74'; Nazarov 78'	Stadium: 20 Years of Independence Stadium; Attendance: 8,000; Referee: Sayojon Zainiddinov

19 May 2019	Khatlon	2 – 1	Panjshir	Qurghonteppa
(UTC+5)	Nurmatov 11'; Nuriddin Khamrokulov 21'	Report	Saidzhon Sharipov 80' (pen.)	Stadium: Central Stadium; Attendance: 3,500; Referee: Sayvali Turdiev

==== Week 8 ====
25 May 2019	Panjshir	1 – 3	Khatlon	Kolkhozobod
(UTC+5)	Barotov 59' (o.g.)	Report	Parviz Akhunov 34', 48'; Nuriddin Khamrokulov 85'	Stadium: Panjshir Uktam Mamatova; Attendance: 4,000; Referee: Khurshed Dadoboev

25 May 2019	Kuktosh	3 – 1	Istaravshan	Rudaki
(UTC+5)	Akhtam Kholboev 18'; Misiam Inocent 38'; Muhiddin Odilov 71'	Report	Karimov 9'	Stadium: Oilfield Stadium; Attendance: 7,000; Referee: Halim Shirzad

26 May 2019	Istiklol	2 – 1	Khujand	Dushanbe
(UTC+5)	Boboev 45'; Z.Juraboev 68'	Report	Rustamov 19'	Stadium: Pamir Stadium; Attendance: 400; Referee: Saivali Turdiyev

26 May 2019	Regar-TadAZ	1 – 1	CSKA Pamir Dushanbe	Tursunzoda
(UTC+5)	Rustamov 38'	Report	Shodibek Gafforov 12'	Stadium: TALCO Arena; Attendance: 3,000; Referee: Gulmurodi Sadullo

==== Week 9 ====
16 June 2019	Khatlon	0 – 1	Kuktosh	Qurghonteppa
(UTC+5)		Report	Muhiddin Odilov 58'	Stadium: Central Stadium; Attendance: 5,000; Referee: Halim Shirzad

30 June 2019	Khujand	9 – 0	Panjshir	Khujand
(UTC+5)	Vasiev 4', 14', 30', 50', 69'; Rustamov 16', 18', 23'; Chakalov 63'	Report		Stadium: 20 Years of Independence Stadium; Attendance: 3,000; Referee: Behruz Murtazoev

30 June 2019	Istaravshan	2 – 1	Regar-TadAZ	Istaravshan
(UTC+5)	Kahramon Khomidov 22'; Nasim Rasulov 42'	Report	Arash Akbari 41'	Stadium: Central Stadium; Attendance: 10,500; Referee: Nekruz Umarov

30 June 2019	Istiklol	3 – 0	CSKA Pamir Dushanbe	Dushanbe
18:00 (UTC+5)	A.Juraboev 28'; Boboev 44'; Samiyev 79'	Report		Stadium: Pamir Stadium; Attendance: 300; Referee: Abdurashid Murodov

==== Week 10 ====
22 June 2019	Kuktosh	0 – 2	Khujand	Rudaki
(UTC+5)		Report	Chakalov 36'; Vasiev 87'	Stadium: Oilfield Stadium; Attendance: 7,000; Referee: Sayedzhon Zayniddinov

23 June 2019	Regar-TadAZ	1 – 1	Khatlon	Tursunzoda
(UTC+5)	Sherzod Makhamadiev 17'	Report	Khudoidod Uzokov 10'	Stadium: TALCO Arena; Attendance: 2,000; Referee: Nasrullo Kabirov

23 June 2019	CSKA Pamir Dushanbe	0 – 1	Istaravshan	Dushanbe
(UTC+5)		Report	Muhammadali Azizboyev 77'	Stadium: CSKA Stadium; Attendance: 400; Referee: Sayvali Turdiev

24 July 2019	Istiklol	2 – 0	Panjshir	Dushanbe
(UTC+5)	Boboev 2'; Mahmarajab Jobirov 50' (o.g.)	Report		Stadium: Pamir Stadium; Attendance: 300; Referee: Murod Kurbonov
Note: Match was original scheduled for 22 June.

==== Week 11 ====
9 August 2019	Istaravshan	0 – 1	Istiklol	Istaravshan
(UTC+5)		Report	A.Dzhalilov 45+3'	Stadium: Central Stadium; Attendance: 14,000; Referee: Abdurashid Murodov

10 August 2019	Khatlon	0 – 1	CSKA Pamir Dushanbe	Qurghonteppa
(UTC+5)		Report	Shervoni Mabatshoev 56'	Stadium: Central Stadium; Attendance: 1,500; Referee: Gulmurodi Sadullo

10 August 2019	Panjshir	1 – 1	Kuktosh	Kolkhozobod
(UTC+5)	Abdulatif Tojiakhmedov 33' (pen.)	Report	Muhiddin Odilov 16'	Stadium: Panjshir Uktam Mamatova; Attendance: 1,500; Referee: Abdullo Davlatov

10 August 2019	Regar-TadAZ	0 – 1	Khujand	Tursunzoda
(UTC+5)		Report	J.Ergashev 56' (pen.)	Stadium: TALCO Arena; Attendance: 2,000; Referee: Nekruz Umarov

==== Week 12 ====
17 August 2019	Regar-TadAZ	2 – 0	Panjshir	Tursunzoda
(UTC+5)	Babadjanov 27', 90+3'	Report		Stadium: TALCO Arena; Attendance: 800; Referee: Gulmurodi Sadullo

17 August 2019	Istiklol	0 – 0	Kuktosh	Dushanbe
(UTC+5)		Report		Stadium: Pamir Stadium; Attendance: 850; Referee: Khusravi Siddikzod

18 August 2019	CSKA Pamir Dushanbe	2 – 1	Khujand	Dushanbe
(UTC+5)	Shervoni Mabatshoev 70'; Shodibek Gafforov 88'	Report	D.Ergashev 28'	Stadium: CSKA Stadium; Attendance: 1,500; Referee: Nasrullo Kabirov

18 August 2019	Istaravshan	0 – 3	Khatlon	Istaravshan
(UTC+5)		Report		Stadium: Central Stadium; Attendance: 10,000; Referee: Sayedzhon Zayniddinov
Note: Match originally finished Istaravshan 1-2 Khatlon, but was awarded 3-0 to Khatlon at a later date.

==== Week 13 ====
24 August 2019	CSKA Pamir Dushanbe	2 – 0	Panjshir	Dushanbe
(UTC+5)	Shervoni Mabatshoev 10' (pen.); Shodibek Gafforov 75'	Report		Stadium: CSKA Stadium; Attendance: 500; Referee: Murod Kurbonov

24 August 2019	Kuktosh	3 – 4	Regar-TadAZ	Rudaki
(UTC+5)	Amirjon Safarov 45+2'; Mukhsin Abdugafforov 73' (pen.); Karimov 83'	Report	Sherzod Makhamadiev 21', 38', 75'; Babadjanov 48'	Stadium: Oilfield Stadium; Attendance: 1,200; Referee: Nasrullo Kabirov

24 August 2019	Istiklol	5 – 0	Khatlon	Dushanbe
(UTC+5)	Rakhimov 14', 67'; Boboev 64', 82'; A.Dzhalilov 84'	Report		Stadium: Pamir Stadium; Attendance: 200; Referee: Khurshed Dadoboev

24 October 2019	Khujand	3 – 1	Istaravshan	Khujand
(UTC+5)	Ergashev 48' (pen.); Dilshod Bozorov 50'; Chakalov 66'	Report	Bakhtovar Zokirov 90+4'	Stadium: 20 Years of Independence Stadium; Attendance: 6,000; Referee: Abdurashid Murodov

==== Week 14 ====
14 September 2019	CSKA Pamir Dushanbe	3 – 2	Kuktosh	Dushanbe
(UTC+5)	Komroni Mirzohon 28', 90'; Prince Arthur 59'	Report	Bakhtiyor Kalandarov 47'; Sultonsho Mirzoev 75'	Stadium: CSKA Stadium; Attendance: 1,000; Referee: Khurshed Dadoboev

14 September 2019	Istaravshan	3 – 2	Panjshir	Istaravshan
(UTC+5)	Firuz Karaev 7', 61'; Dilovar Boykuziev 21'	Report	Sharifjon Kodirov 3'; Khurshed Abdulloev 52'	Stadium: Central Stadium; Attendance: 6,000; Referee: Behruz Murtazoev

15 September 2019	Regar-TadAZ	2 – 3	Istiklol	Tursunzoda
(UTC+5)	Dilovarsho Ganiev 72'; Akbar Bobomurodov 77'	Report	Rakhimov 33'; A.Dzhalilov 54' (penalty missed) 86'; Tursunov 57'	Stadium: TALCO Arena; Attendance: 3,000; Referee: Sayedzhon Zayniddinov

15 September 2019	Khatlon	2 – 0	Khujand	Kolkhozobod
(UTC+5)	Ekhson Boboev 55'; Khamrakulov 72'	Report		Stadium: Panjshir Uktam Mamatova; Attendance: 1,000; Referee: Abdullo Davlatov

==== Week 15 ====
18 September 2019	Khatlon	2 – 2	Istiklol	Qurghonteppa
(UTC+5)	Naimjon Ibrahimzoda 70'; Abdukhalil Boronov 90'	Report	A.Dzhalilov 11'; Boboev 42'	Stadium: Qurghonteppa; Attendance: 3,000; Referee: Abdurashid Murodov

18 September 2019	Istaravshan	1 – 0	CSKA Pamir Dushanbe	Istaravshan
(UTC+5)	Mbeke Dieudonni 76'	Report		Stadium: Central Stadium; Attendance: 7,000; Referee: Abdullo Davlatov

18 September 2019	Kuktosh	2 – 3	Khujand	Rudaki
(UTC+5)	Abbos Ikromov 25', 90+3'	Report	Rustamov 19'; Dilshod Bozorov 28', 38'	Stadium: Oilfield Stadium; Attendance: 2,990; Referee: Sayedzhon Zayniddinov

18 September 2019	Regar-TadAZ	0 – 3	Panjshir	Tursunzoda
(UTC+5)		Report		Stadium: TALCO Arena; Attendance: 2,500; Referee: Behruz Murtazoev
Note: Match originally finished Regar-TadAZ 6-1 Panjshir, but was reverted to a 3-0 win to Panjshir on 21 September after Regar-TadAZ were adjudged to have fielded an ineligible player.

==== Week 16 ====
21 September 2019	Khatlon	4 – 0	Panjshir	Qurghonteppa
(UTC+5)	Abdukhalil Boronov 14', 51'; Parviz Akhunov 35'; Umarjon Sharipov 69'	Report		Stadium: Central Stadium; Attendance: 1,500; Referee: Sayedzhon Zayniddinov

21 September 2019	CSKA Pamir Dushanbe	1 – 1	Kuktosh	Dushanbe
(UTC+5)	Shodibek Gafforov 73'	Report	Azizbek Sultonov 25'	Stadium: CSKA Stadium; Attendance: 1,200; Referee: Behruz Murtazoev

22 September 2019	Istiklol	2 – 0	Istaravshan	Dushanbe
(UTC+5)	Boboev 57'; Nazarov 78' (pen.)	Report		Stadium: Pamir Stadium; Attendance: 1,000; Referee: Nekruz Umarov

22 September 2019	Khujand	1 – 0	Regar-TadAZ	Khujand
(UTC+5)	Rustamov 50'	Report		Stadium: 20 Years of Independence Stadium; Attendance: 2,500; Referee: Abdullo Davlatov

==== Week 17 ====
27 September 2019	Istaravshan	1 – 1	Khatlon	Istaravshan
(UTC+5)	Barotov 8'	Report	Parviz Akhunov 89'	Stadium: Central Stadium; Attendance: 5,000; Referee: Gulmurodi Sadullo

27 September 2019	Kuktosh	1 – 6	Istiklol	Rudaki
(UTC+5)	Karimov 71'	Report	A.Dzhalilov 27', 73'; Boboev 40', 61', 87'; Panjshanbe 46'	Stadium: Oilfield Stadium; Attendance: 6,000; Referee: Khurshed Dadaboev

27 September 2019	Regar-TadAZ	2 – 1	CSKA Pamir Dushanbe	Tursunzoda
(UTC+5)	Sherzod Makhamadiev 28'; Arash Akbari 44'	Report	Safarali Karimov 35' (pen.)	Stadium: TALCO Arena; Attendance: 2,000; Referee: Nasrullo Kabirov

27 September 2019	Panjshir	0 – 5	Khujand	Kolkhozobod
(UTC+5)		Report	Barotov 18'; J.Ergashev 19', 66'; Chakalov 60', 64'	Stadium: Panjshir Uktam Mamatova; Attendance: 1,000; Referee: Abdurashid Murodov

==== Week 18 ====
5 October 2019	Khatlon	1 – 2	Khujand	Qurghonteppa
(UTC+5)	Parviz Akhunov 59'	Report	Zakharkiv 66'; Sohibdzhon Khakimov 90+4'	Stadium: Central Stadium; Attendance: 3,500; Referee: Nasrullo Kabirov

5 October 2019	Panjshir	0 – 2	CSKA Pamir Dushanbe	Kolkhozobod
(UTC+5)		Report	Safarali Karimov 35' (pen.); Shervoni Mabatshoev 68'	Stadium: Panjshir Uktam Mamatova; Attendance: 1,500; Referee: Sayedzhon Zayniddinov

5 October 2019	Istiklol	1 – 2	Regar-TadAZ	Hisor
(UTC+5)	Nazarov 72' (pen.)	Report	Dilovarsho Ganiev 27'; Sherzod Makhmadiev 61' (pen.)	Stadium: Central Stadium; Attendance: 500; Referee: Farrukhi Huseynzoda

5 October 2019	Istaravshan	3 – 0	Kuktosh	Istaravshan
(UTC+5)	Bakhtovar Zokirov 35', 75'; Tulkinjon Umarov 84'	Report		Stadium: Central Stadium

==== Week 19 ====
20 October 2019	Kuktosh	2 – 1	Khatlon	Rudaki
(UTC+5)	Ravshan Azizov 37' (o.g.); Azizbek Sultonov 63'	Report	Sorbon Avgonov 78'	Stadium: Oilfield stadium Attendance: 7,000; Referee: Sayedzhon Zayniddinov

20 October 2019	Regar-TadAZ	5 – 2	Istaravshan	Tursunzoda
(UTC+5)	Dilovarsho Ganiev 18'; Sherzod Makhamadiev 30' (pen.), 47' (pen.); Asadbek Ziyozoda 71' (o.g.); Jamoliddin Zardiev 78'	Report	Mbeke Dieudonni 44'; Khojiboy Ziyoev 56'	Stadium: TALCO Arena; Attendance: 700; Referee: Nasrullo Kabirov

20 October 2019	Panjshir	2 – 4	Istiklol	Kolkhozobod
(UTC+5)	Amir Memari 49', 63'	Report	Rakhimov 2', 55'; Boboev 23'; Samiyev 25'	Stadium: Panjshir Uktam Mamatova; Attendance: 1,5000; Referee: Abdullo Davlatov

20 October 2019	Khujand	0 – 0	CSKA Pamir Dushanbe	Khujand
(UTC+5)		Report		Stadium: 20 Years of Independence Stadium; Attendance: 3,200; Referee: Gulmurodi Sadullo

==== Week 20 ====
27 October 2019	Khatlon	1 – 2	CSKA Pamir Dushanbe	Qurghonteppa
15:00 (UTC+5)	Khudoidod Uzokov 2'	Report	Mukhtor Ortikov 9'; Bilol Sulaimonov 74'	Stadium: Central Stadium; Attendance: 5,000; Referee: Khurshed Dadoboev

27 October 2019	Istaravshan	3 – 0	Panjshir	Istaravshan
15:00 (UTC+5)	Mbeke Dieudonni 40'; Tulkinjon Umarov 83'; Abdurahmon Kurbonov 86'	Report		Stadium: Central Stadium; Attendance: 5,000; Referee: Sayedzhon Zayniddinov

27 October 2019	Kuktosh	0 – 0	Regar-TadAZ	Rudaki
15:00 (UTC+5)		Report		Stadium: Oilfield stadium Attendance: 3,000; Referee: Gulmurodi Sadullo

27 October 2019	Istiklol	2 – 1	Khujand	Dushanbe
16:00 (UTC+5)	Panjshanbe 4'; A.Dzhalilov 54'	Report	Rakhimov 90+1' (o.g.)	Stadium: Pamir Stadium; Attendance: 700; Referee: Behruz Murtazoev

==== Week 21 ====
4 November 2019	Regar-TadAZ	0 – 0	Khatlon	Tursunzoda
14:30 (UTC+5)		Report		Stadium: TALCO Arena

4 November 2019	Panjshir	3 – 5	Kuktosh	Kolkhozobod
14:30 (UTC+5)	Mahmud Gayurov 48'; Khayriddin Turakhonov 52'; Shavkat Khudoynazarov 74'	Report	Mukhsin Abdugafforov 3'; Karimov 19', 50'; Sobirdzhon Kholmatov 25', 29'	Stadium: Panjshir Uktam Mamatova

4 November 2019	Khujand	0 – 1	Istaravshan	Khujand
14:30 (UTC+5)		Report	Khojiboy Ziyoev 47'	Stadium: 20 Years of Independence Stadium

4 November 2019	CSKA Pamir Dushanbe	3 – 2	Istiklol	Dushanbe
14:30 (UTC+5)	Shervoni Mabatshoev 5', 86'; Shodibek Gafforov 11'	Report	Mukhammad Khakimzoda 73'; Boboev 90+1'	Stadium: CSKA Stadium

== Relegation play-offs ==
The 2019 season ended with a relegation play-off between the 7th-placed Tajikistan Higher League team, and the runners-up of the Tajik First Division, on a two-legged confrontation.

Khatlon	v

v	Khatlon

== Season statistics ==
=== Scoring ===
- First goal of the season:

=== Top scorers ===
As of match played 4 November 2019

Rank	Player	Club	Goals
1	(Tajikistan) Sheriddin Boboev	Istiklol	16
2	(Tajikistan) Alisher Dzhalilov	Istiklol	11
3	(Tajikistan) Sherzod Makhamadiev	Regar-TadAZ	9
4	(Kyrgyzstan) Tursunali Rustamov	Khujand	8
5	(Tajikistan) Muhammadjon Rakhimov	Istiklol	7
5	(Tajikistan) Nozim Babadjanov	Regar-TadAZ	7
5	(Tajikistan) Bakhtovar Zokirov	Istaravshan	7
5	(Tajikistan) Ehson Panjshanbe	Istiklol	7
5	(Tajikistan) Shodibek Gafforov	CSKA Pamir Dushanbe	7
10	(Tajikistan) Shervoni Mabatshoev	CSKA Pamir Dushanbe	6
10	(Tajikistan) Dilshod Vasiev	Khujand	6
10	(Tajikistan) Muhiddin Odilov	Kuktosh	6

=== Hat-tricks ===
Player	For	Against	Result	Date	Ref
(Kyrgyzstan) Tursunali Rustamov	Khujand	Panjshir	9-0	30 June 2019	
(Tajikistan) Dilshod Vasiev^{5}	Khujand	Panjshir	9-0	30 June 2019	
(Tajikistan) Sherzod Makhamadiev	Regar-TadAZ	Kuktosh	4-3	24 August 2019	
(Tajikistan) Sheriddin Boboev	Istiklol	Kuktosh	6-1	27 September 2019	

- ^{5} Player scored 5 goals
