= 2018 FC Istiklol season =

FC Istiklol
2018 season
- President: Shohruh Saidov
- Manager: Mukhsin Mukhamadiev (until 22 May); Alisher Tukhtaev (Caretaker) (from 22 May)
- Stadium: Republican Stadium
- Tajik League: 1st
- Tajik Cup: Champions
- Tajik Supercup: Champions
- AFC Cup: Group Stage
- Top goalscorer: League: Sheriddin Boboev (12); All: Sheriddin Boboev (16)

The FC Istiklol 2018 season is Istiklol's tenth Tajik League season. They are the current defending Tajik League Champions and will also participate in the Tajik Cup, Tajik Supercup and AFC Cup, entering at the group stage.

== Season Events ==
After being knocked out of the 2018 AFC Cup at the group stage, manager Mukhsin Mukhamadiev resigned as manager six-days later on 22 May 2018, with Alisher Tukhtaev being appointed as acting head coach.

== Squad ==
As of match played 11 November 2018

No.	Name	Nationality	Position	Date of birth (age)	Signed from	Signed in	Contract ends	Apps.	Goals
Goalkeepers
1	Nikola Stošić	(Serbia)	GK	15 March 1994 (aged 24)	Železničar Beograd	2013		124	0
35	Rustam Yatimov	(Russia)	GK	13 July 1998 (aged 20)		2018	2020	3	0
36	Behrouz Hayriev	(Tajikistan)	GK	1 May 1998 (aged 20)	Trainee	2017		0	0
Defenders
2	Siyovush Asrorov	(Tajikistan)	DF	21 July 1992 (aged 26)	Khujand	2013		129	11
3	Tabrezi Davlatmir	(Tajikistan)	DF	6 June 1998 (aged 20)	Trainee	2016		41	0
5	Artem Baranovskyi	(Ukraine)	DF	17 March 1990 (aged 28)	Olimpik Donetsk	2017		53	2
19	Akhtam Nazarov	(Tajikistan)	DF	29 September 1992 (aged 26)	Energetik Dushanbe	2013		157	17
27	Alisher Sharipov	(Tajikistan)	DF	22 April 1994 (aged 24)	Regar-TadAZ	2018		5	0
	Amir Nigmatov	(Tajikistan)	DF	28 April 1999 (aged 19)	Trainee	2018		2	0
	Shahbol Rajabov	(Tajikistan)	DF	4 January 2000 (aged 18)	Trainee	2018		1	0
	Khurshedi Zainiddin	(Tajikistan)	DF		Trainee	2018		2	0
Midfielders
7	Jahongir Abdumominov	(Uzbekistan)	MF	9 February 1993 (aged 25)	Sogdiana Jizzakh	2018	2019	14	4
11	Muhammadjon Rakhimov	(Tajikistan)	MF	15 October 1998 (aged 20)	Khosilot Farkhor	2017		39	3
13	Nozim Babadjanov	(Tajikistan)	MF	7 August 1995 (aged 23)	Chernomorets Balchik	2018		60	12
18	Fatkhullo Fatkhuloev	(Tajikistan)	MF	24 March 1990 (aged 28)	Persela Lamongan	2018		176+	60+
20	Amirbek Juraboev	(Tajikistan)	MF	13 April 1996 (aged 22)	Barki Tajik	206		82	5
23	Ehson Panjshanbe	(Tajikistan)	MF	12 May 1999 (aged 19)	Trainee	2016		52	4
70	Shakhrom Sulaimonov	(Tajikistan)	MF	27 June 1997 (aged 21)	Utenis Utena	2018		17	0
	Farhod Kosimov	(Tajikistan)	MF	18 September 2000 (aged 18)	Trainee	2018		9	0
Forwards
14	Sheriddin Boboev	(Tajikistan)	ST	21 April 1999 (aged 19)	Trainee	2016		38	20
17	Dilshod Vasiev	(Tajikistan)	ST	12 February 1988 (aged 30)	Energetik Dushanbe	2009		183+	124+
28	Komron Tursunov	(Tajikistan)	ST	24 April 1996 (aged 22)	Regar-TadAZ	2018		24	4
	Hamid Golami	(Afghanistan)	ST		Trainee	2018		1	0
Unknown
	Ziyovuddin Fuzaylov	(Tajikistan)	DF	7 March 2000 (aged 18)	Youth Team	2015		21	5
Left during the season
6	Davron Erghashev	(Tajikistan)	DF	19 March 1988 (aged 30)	Taraz	2018		22+	1+
7	Sergey Tikhonovsky	(Belarus)	MF	26 June 1990 (aged 28)	Vitebsk	2018		6	0
9	Mikalay Zyanko	(Belarus)	ST	11 March 1989 (aged 29)	Slavia Mozyr	2018		15	5
21	Romish Jalilov	(Tajikistan)	MF	21 November 1995 (aged 22)	Trainee	2012		97+	18+
33	Oleksandr Harbar	(Ukraine)	DF	9 February 1993 (aged 25)		2018		2	0

== Transfers ==
=== In ===
Date	Position	Nationality	Name	From	Fee	Ref.
Winter 2018	GK	(Tajikistan)	Behrouz Hayriev	Barkchi	Undisclosed	
Winter 2018	DF	(Tajikistan)	Davron Erghashev	Taraz	Undisclosed	
Winter 2018	DF	(Tajikistan)	Alisher Sharipov	Regar-TadAZ		
Winter 2018	DF	(Ukraine)	Oleksandr Garbar			
Winter 2018	MF	(Belarus)	Sergey Tikhonovsky	Vitebsk	Undisclosed	
Winter 2018	MF	(Tajikistan)	Nozim Babadjanov	Chernomorets Balchik	Undisclosed	
Winter 2018	MF	(Tajikistan)	Fatkhullo Fatkhuloev	Persela Lamongan	Undisclosed	
Winter 2018	MF	(Tajikistan)	Shakhrom Sulaimonov	Utenis Utena	Undisclosed	
Winter 2018	FW	(Belarus)	Mikalay Zyanko	Slavia Mozyr	Undisclosed	
Winter 2018	FW	(Tajikistan)	Komron Tursunov	Regar-TadAZ	Undisclosed	
19 July 2018	MF	(Uzbekistan)	Jahongir Abdumominov	Sogdiana Jizzakh	Undisclosed	
23 July 2018	GK	(Russia)	Rustam Yatimov		Free	

=== Out ===
Date	Position	Nationality	Name	From	Fee	Ref.
21 December 2017	MF	(Tajikistan)	Nuriddin Davronov	Madura United	Undisclosed	
30 December 2017	MF	(Tajikistan)	Fatkhullo Fatkhuloev	Persela Lamongan	Undisclosed	
4 January 2018	FW	(Tajikistan)	Manuchekhr Dzhalilov	Sriwijaya	Undisclosed	
15 January 2018	FW	(Tajikistan)	Jahongir Aliev	Nasaf Qarshi	Undisclosed	
26 March 2018	MF	(Tajikistan)	Alisher Mirzoev	Speranța Nisporeni	Undisclosed	

=== Released ===
Date	Position	Nationality	Name	Joined	Date
Winter 2018	DF	(Tajikistan)	Oybek Abdugafforov	Regar-TadAZ	
Winter 2018	DF	(Ukraine)	Oleksandr Stetsenko	Kyzylzhar	Summer 2018
Winter 2018	MF	(Ghana)	David Mawutor	Zhetysu	
Winter 2018	FW	(Russia)	Dmitry Barkov	Narva Trans	8 February 2018
Summer 2018	DF	(Tajikistan)	Davron Erghashev	Khujand	29 January 2019
Summer 2018	DF	(Ukraine)	Oleksandr Garbar	Karkonosze Jelenia Gora	
Summer 2018	MF	(Belarus)	Sergey Tikhonovsky	Gorodeya	
Summer 2018	MF	(Tajikistan)	Romish Jalilov	Istiklol	Summer 2020
Summer 2018	FW	(Belarus)	Mikalay Zyanko	Gorodeya	

=== Trial ===
Date From	Date To	Position	Nationality	Name	Last club	Ref.
25 January 2018		DF	(Tajikistan)	Alisher Sharipov	Regar-TadAZ	
25 January 2018		MF	(Tajikistan)	Nozim Babadjanov	Chernomorets Balchik	
25 January 2018		FW	(Tajikistan)	Komron Tursunov	Regar-TadAZ	
26 January 2018	7 February 2018	MF	(Belarus)	Dmitri Khlebosolov	Neman Grodno	
26 January 2018	7 February 2018	MF	(Russia)	Maksim Terentyev		
26 January 2018	7 February 2018	MF	(Ukraine)	Valeriy Kucherov	Veres Rivne	
6 February 2018		GK	(Tajikistan)	Behrouz Hayriev	Barkchi	
7 February 2018		MF	(Ukraine)	Kyrylo Silich	Jonava	
		DF	(Tajikistan)	Davron Erghashev	Taraz	
		DF	(Ukraine)	Oleksandr Garbar		
		MF	(Belarus)	Sergey Tikhonovsky	Vitebsk	
		MF	(Tajikistan)	Fatkhullo Fatkhuloev	Persela Lamongan	
		MF	(Belarus)	Mikalay Zyanko	Slavia Mozyr	
		FW	(Ghana)	Francis Agbleta		

== Friendlies ==
18 January 2018	Istiklol	2–0	Tajikistan U16	Dushanbe
14:00 (UTC+5)	Rakhimov 5'; F.Kosimov 87'	Report		Stadium: Central Republican Stadium

5 February 2018	Istiklol	3–2	Khujand	Dushanbe
13:00 (UTC+5)	Vasiev 40'; Panjshanbe 66' (yellow card); Boboev 90'; Rakhimov (yellow card); Silich (yellow card); Asrorov (yellow card); Nazarov (yellow card)	Report	Ergashev 15'; K.Hasanboyev 62'; Tukhtasunov (yellow card)	Stadium: Central Republican Stadium; Attendance: 350; Referee: Erkin Madiboev

18 February 2018	Kokand 1912 (Uzbekistan)	2–0	(Tajikistan) Istiklol	Tashkent, Uzbekistan
(UTC+5)	Pardaev 42'; O.Rustamov 80'	Report	Zyanko (yellow card)	Stadium: FC Bunyodkor Academy; Referee: Igor Khudoydodov

20 February 2018	Sogdiana Jizzakh (Uzbekistan)	2–0	(Tajikistan) Istiklol	Tashkent, Uzbekistan
(UTC+5)	S.Norhonov 25' (pen.); T.Shamsutdinov (red card) 75'; A.Isroilov 77'; D.Hasanov (yellow card)	Report	Fatkhuloev (red card) 75'; Davlatmir (red card) 75'; Erghashev (yellow card); Vasiev (yellow card)	Stadium: FC Bunyodkor Academy; Referee: Sherzod Kasymov

21 February 2018	Oqtepa (Uzbekistan)	3–5	(Tajikistan) Istiklol	Tashkent, Uzbekistan
(UTC+5)	Solomin 12'; S.Safarov 20' (yellow card); S.Hikmatov 44'; I.Khakimov (penalty missed) 90'	Report	Boboev 27', 29', 66', 80'; Juraboev 62'; Davlatmir (yellow card); Erghashev (yellow card)

23 February 2018	Qizilqum Zarafshon (Uzbekistan)	1–1	(Tajikistan) Istiklol	Tashkent, Uzbekistan
(UTC+5)	Zyanko 67'	Report	E.Baidullaev 77'	Stadium: JAR Stadium; Referee: Akram Riskullayev

25 February 2018	Surkhan (Uzbekistan)	2–4	(Tajikistan) Istiklol	Tashkent, Uzbekistan
(UTC+5)	S.Eminov 15', 22'; Tadjiyev (yellow card)	Report	Tikhonovsky 2'; Baranovskyi 55'; Boboev 75'; Vasiev 80'; Jalilov (yellow card); Nazarov (yellow card)	Referee: Abdurashid Khudaiberdiyev

27 March 2018	Istiklol	2–0	Mahallai-83	Dushanbe
(UTC+5)	Tursunov 70' (pen.); B.Khairiev 80'	Report		Stadium: Central Republican Stadium

6 July 2018	Istiklol	5–1	CSKA Pamir Dushanbe	Dushanbe
(UTC+5)	Rakhimov 20'; Fatkhuloev 60'; Homid Gulomi 75'; Boboev 84'; Vasiev 89'	Report	Mukhsin Abdugafforov 48'	Stadium: Central Republican Stadium

17 July 2018	Istiklol	2–0	Panjshir	Dushanbe
(UTC+5)	Vasiev 70', 88'	Report		Stadium: Central Republican Stadium

== TFF Cup ==
=== Preliminary round ===
Pos	Team	Pld	W	D	L	GF	GA	GD	Pts	Qualification
1	(Tajikistan) CSKA Pamir Dushanbe	3	3	0	0	6	2	+4	9	Advance to Group Stage
2	(Tajikistan) Istiklol	3	2	0	1	11	2	+9	6	Advance to Group Stage
3	(Tajikistan) FC Mahallai-83	3	1	0	2	1	5	−4	3	
4	(Tajikistan) Kuktosh Rudaki	3	0	0	3	1	10	−9	0	

Updated to match(es) played on 24 January 2018. Source: Group "B" was composed of Istiklol (Dushanbe), Kuktosh (Rudaki), FC-83 (Dushanbe) and CSKA Pamir (Dushanbe).

22 January 2018 1	Istiklol	1–2	CSKA Pamir Dushanbe	Dushanbe
14:00 (UTC+5)	Asrorov 8'	Report	A.Boronov 41'; M.Abdugafforov 58'	Stadium: Central Republican Stadium; Referee: Nasrullo Kabirov

24 January 2018 2	Istiklol	6–0	Kuktosh	Dushanbe
14:00 (UTC+5)	Asrorov 8'; Boboev 12', 48'; Vasiev 45' (pen.); K.Golami 86'; J.Tursunov 90+2'; Nazarov (yellow card); Panjshanbe (yellow card)	Report	A.Prince (yellow card) (yellow-red card) 84'	Stadium: Central Republican Stadium; Attendance: 600; Referee: Akobir Fazullozoda

26 January 2018 3	Mahallai-83	0–4	Istiklol	Dushanbe
14:00 (UTC+5)	I.Yurov (yellow card); K.Oduro (yellow card); R.Tilloev (yellow card); B.Asamoah (yellow card)	Report	Asrorov 44' (pen.); Vasiev 61'; Jalilov 64'; Panjshanbe (yellow card) (yellow-red card) 84'; Tursunov 88'; Rakhimov (yellow card)	Stadium: Central Republican Stadium; Attendance: 100; Referee: Behrouz Murtazoev

=== Finals Group ===
Pos	Team	Pld	W	D	L	GF	GA	GD	Pts	Qualification
1	(Tajikistan) Regar-TadAZ	3	2	1	0	8	2	+6	7	Advance to Semi-finals
2	(Tajikistan) Istiklol	3	2	0	1	11	2	+9	6	Advance to Semi-finals
3	(Tajikistan) Vakhsh Qurghonteppa	3	1	1	1	9	2	+7	4	
4	(Tajikistan) Asht	3	0	0	3	0	22	−22	0	

Updated to match(es) played on 16 February 2017. Source: Istiklol

8 February 2017 1	Istiklol	1–0	Vakhsh Qurghonteppa	Dushanbe
14:00 (UTC+5)	Boboev 51' (yellow card); Vasiev (yellow card); O.Garbar (yellow card); A.Sharipov (yellow card)	Report	K.Uzokov (yellow card)	Stadium: Pamir Stadium; Referee: Abdurashid Murodov

10 February 2018 2	Istiklol	1–2	Regar-TadAZ	Dushanbe
14:00 (UTC+5)	Vasiev 4'; A.Sharipov (yellow card); Rakhimov (yellow card); Asrorov (yellow card)	Report	A.Safarov 51' (yellow card); D.Ergashev 68'; F.Karaev (yellow card)	Stadium: Pamir Stadium; Referee: Nekruz Umarov

12 February 2018 3	Istiklol	9–0	Asht	Dushanbe
14:00 (UTC+5)	Ermatov (yellow card); D.Holmatov (yellow card)	Report	Vasiev 32', 52', 70'; Boboev 37', 49'; O.Garbar 51'; Babadjanov 73'; Silich 79'; J.Sulaimonov 80'	Stadium: Pamir Stadium; Attendance: 200; Referee: Sayejon Zainiddinov

=== Knockout phase ===
14 February 2018 Semi-final	Istiklol	5–1	Panjshir	Dushanbe
11:00 (UTC+5)	Vasiev 24'; O.Garbar 62'; J.Tursunov 71', 85'; Babadjanov 87'	Report	R.Azizov 73'; A.Hotham (yellow card)	Stadium: Pamir Stadium; Referee: Sayvali Turdiyev

16 February 2018 Final	Istiklol	3–1	Regar-TadAZ	Dushanbe
12:00 (UTC+5)	Jalilov 45+2'; Vasiev 71'; Panjshanbe 75' (yellow card); N.Stošić (yellow card); O.Garbar (yellow card); Erghashev (yellow card)	Report	S.Saidahmad 80' (red card) 88'; S.Allayev (yellow card); A.Safarov (yellow card)	Stadium: Pamir Stadium; Attendance: 1,000; Referee: Behrouz Murtazoev

== Competitions ==
=== Tajik Supercup ===
2 March 2018	Istiklol	3–2	Khujand	Hisor
16:00 (UTC+5)	Chakalov 45' (o.g.); Zyanko 60'; Babadjanov 107'; Nazarov (yellow card)	Report	Chakalov 17'; A.Jones 31'; Rustamov (yellow card)	Stadium: Central Stadium; Attendance: Behrouz Murtazoev; Referee: 5,436

=== Tajik League ===
==== Results summary ====
Overall								Home						Away					
Pld	W	D	L	GF	GA	GD	Pts	W	D	L	GF	GA	GD	W	D	L	GF	GA	GD
20	16	3	1	36	15	+21	51	7	1	0	15	6	+9	9	2	1	21	9	+12

Last updated: 11 November 2018.
Source: See Results

==== Results by round ====
Round	1	2	3	4	5	6	7	8	9	10	11	12	13	14	15	16	17	18	19	20	21
Ground	H	H	H	H	A	H	H	H	A	A	A	A	A	A	A	A	A	H	A	H	A
Result	W	W	W	W	D	W	D	W	L	W	W	W	W	W	D	W	W	W	W	L	W
Position	1	2	1	1	1	2	1	2	2	2	1	1	1	1	2	2	2	1	1	1	1

Source: Results
A = Away; H = Home; W = Win; D = Draw; L = Loss

==== Results ====
10 March 2018 1	Istiklol	1–3	Khatlon	Hisor
16:30 (UTC+5)	N.Rustamov 85' (pen.); F.Boboev (yellow card)	Report	Boboev 10', 37'; Tursunov 45'; O.Garbar (yellow card)	Stadium: Central Stadium; Attendance: 11,000; Referee: Abdurashid Murodov

1 April 2018 3	Istiklol	2–1	Regar-TadAZ	Hisor
19:00 (UTC+5)	Boboev 15'; Panjshanbe 31'; Fatkhuloev (yellow card); Erghashev (yellow card); Nazarov (yellow card); Jalilov (yellow card); Asrorov (yellow card)	Report	K.Azizov 69'; B.Azimov (yellow card)	Stadium: Central Stadium; Referee: Sayojon Zainiddinov

4 April 2018 4	Istiklol	2–0	Kuktosh	Hisor
19:00 (UTC+5)	F.Safarzoda 18' (o.g.); Jalilov 26'; Rakhimov (yellow card); Fatkhuloev (yellow card); Panjshanbe (yellow card)	Report	I.Okran (yellow card); M.Sadykov (yellow card)	Stadium: Central Stadium; Attendance: 1,000; Referee: Nekruz Umarov

14 April 2018 5	Istiklol	1–0	Khujand	Hisor
18:00 (UTC+5)	Vasiev 77'; Erghashev (yellow card) 90+4' (yellow-red card); Juraboev (yellow card); Asrorov (yellow card); Panjshanbe (yellow card)	Report	A.Jones (yellow card); Rustamov (yellow card); F.Khasanboev (yellow card); Ergashev (yellow card)	Stadium: Central Stadium; Attendance: 200; Referee: Sayojon Zainiddinov

18 April 2018 6	Panjshir	0–0	Istiklol	Kolkhozobod
17:30 (UTC+5)	K.Kholov (yellow card); K.Sheraliev (yellow card); G.Quaye (yellow card)	Report	Fatkhuloev (yellow card); Zyanko (yellow card)	Stadium: Panjshir Uktam Mamatova; Attendance: 4,000; Referee: Aburashid Murodov

6 May 2018 2	Istiklol	2–1	Barkchi	Hisor
19:00 (UTC+5)	Fatkhuloev 28'; Boboev 55'; Panjshanbe (yellow card); Davlatmir (yellow card)	Report	V.Khanonov 65'; M.Safarov (yellow card); S.Azimov (yellow card)	Stadium: Central Stadium; Attendance: 300; Referee: Khusrawi Siddiqzod

9 May 2018 7	Istiklol	3–3	CSKA Pamir Dushanbe	Hisor
18:00 (UTC+5)	Vasiev 64', 90+3'; Erghashev (red card) 68'; C.Tursunov 83'; Panjshanbe (yellow card)	Report	S.Gafforov 24' (yellow card); M.Abdugafforov 77' (yellow card); A.Boronov 86' (yellow card)	Stadium: Central Stadium; Attendance: 300; Referee: Sayvali Turdiyev

21 May 2018 9	Istiklol	1–0	Panjshir	Hisor
(UTC+5)	Zyanko 12'; Tikhonovsky (yellow card); Rakhimov (yellow card); Fatkhuloev (yellow card)	Report	S.Avgonov; H.Holov (yellow card)	Stadium: Central Stadium; Attendance: 700; Referee: Vladimir Domladzhanov

24 May 2018 10	Khujand	4–3	Istiklol	Khujand
17:00 (UTC+5)	Rustamov 26'; Tokhirov 28'; H.Rasulov 65'; D.Bozorov 90' (yellow card); Chakalov (yellow card)	Report	Zyanko 21'; Babadjanov 24'; Jalilov 35' (yellow card)	Stadium: 20 Years of Independence Stadium; Attendance: 8,500; Referee: Svetlan Turdiyev

3 June 2018 11	Kuktosh	0–2	Istiklol	Neftyanik
(UTC+5)	I.Okran (yellow card)	Report	Rakhimov 35' (yellow card); Vasiev 38'; Panjshanbe (yellow card)	Stadium: Rudaki Stadium; Attendance: 6,000; Referee: Nasrullo Kabirov

10 June 2018 8	CSKA Pamir Dushanbe	1–2	Istiklol	Hisor
(UTC+5)	S.Solekhov 85'; P.Kashkarov (yellow card); S.Kosimov (yellow card)	Report	Nazarov 18'; Rakhimov 23' (yellow card); Davlatmir (red card) 90+3'	Stadium: Central Stadium; Attendance: 200; Referee: Gulmurody Sadullo

29 July 2018 12	Regar-TadAZ	1–2	Istiklol	Tursunzoda
(UTC+5)	N.Rustamov (penalty missed) 16' (yellow card); Asrorov 83' (o.g.); S.Mahamadiev (yellow card); M.Zainiddinov (yellow card)	Report	Vasiev 77'; Boboev 87'; Asrorov (yellow card)	Stadium: TALCO Arena; Attendance: 3,000; Referee: Gulmurody Sadullo

5 August 2018 13	Barkchi	0–1	Istiklol	Hisor
(UTC+5)	D.Yodgorov (yellow card)	Report	Vasiev 31' (pen.); Sulaimonov (yellow card); Asrorov (yellow card); Babadjanov (yellow card)	Stadium: Central Stadium; Attendance: 250; Referee: Sayvali Turdiyev

19 August 2018 14	Khatlon	0–1	Istiklol	Bokhtar
(UTC+5)	P.Akhunov (yellow card); D.Shomurodov (yellow card); A.Barotov (yellow card); K.Uzokov (yellow card)	Report	Fatkhuloev 53'; Panjshanbe (yellow card); Sulaimonov (yellow card)	Stadium: Pakhtakor Stadium; Attendance: 2,000; Referee: Sayojon Zainiddinov

26 August 2018 15	Khatlon	1–1	Istiklol	Bokhtar
(UTC+5)	K.Saidov 58'; U.Sharipov (yellow card); Rajabov (yellow card); M.Sadykov (yellow card); N.Ibrahimzoda (yellow card)	Report	Vasiev (penalty missed) 45'; Nazarov 79' (pen.); Abdumominov (yellow card); C.Tursunov (yellow card); Juraboev (yellow card); Babadjanov (yellow card)	Stadium: Pakhtakor Stadium; Attendance: 2,000; Referee: Behrouz Murtazoev

13 September 2018 16	Regar-TadAZ	0–2	Istiklol	Tursunzoda
(UTC+5)	S.Saidammad (yellow card) (red card) 89'; S.Karimov (yellow card); S.Mahamadiyev (yellow card); R.Khabibulloev (yellow card); A.Bobomurodov (yellow card)	Report	Boboev 42', 49' (yellow card); Panjshanbe (yellow card); Nazarov (yellow card)	Stadium: TALCO Arena; Attendance: 2,000; Referee: Sayojon Zainiddinov

18 September 2018 17	Kuktosh	2–3	Istiklol	Neftyanik
(UTC+5)	M.Muzaffarov 15' (yellow card); I.Okran 58' (pen.); F.Safarzoda (red card) 88'; N.Ibragimov (yellow card); A.Holboev (yellow card); F.Safarzoda (yellow card)	Report	Fatkhuloev 45', 81' (pen.) (yellow card); Juraboev 60'; Rakhimov (yellow card)	Stadium: Rudaki Stadium; Attendance: 4,000; Referee: Gulmurody Sadullo

23 September 2018 18	Istiklol	1–0	Khujand	Dushanbe
18:00 (UTC+5)	Boboev 66'; Panjshanbe (yellow card); Baranovskyi (yellow card)	Report	K.Beknazarov (yellow card); D.Bondar (yellow card)	Stadium: Pamir Stadium; Attendance: 7,000; Referee: Sayojon Zainiddinov

26 September 2018 19	Panjshir	v	Istiklol	Kolkhozobod
(UTC+5)				Stadium: Panjshir Uktam Mamatova
Note: Match postponed due to Tajikistan's participation in the 2018 Bangabandhu Cup.

3 November 2018 19	Panjshir	0–2	Istiklol	Kolkhozobod
14:00 (UTC+5)	A.Tojiahmedov (yellow card)	Report	Boboev 7', 9'; Nazarov (yellow card); Juraboev (yellow card)	Stadium: Panjshir Uktam Mamatova; Attendance: 2,000; Referee: Behruz Murtazoev
Note: Match originally scheduled for 26 September 2018

7 November 2018 20	Istiklol	0–1	CSKA Pamir Dushanbe	Dushanbe
14:00 (UTC+5)	Abdumominov (yellow card); Fatkhuloev (yellow card)	Report	S.Gafforov 54'; Z.Kholikov (yellow card)	Stadium: Pamir Stadium; Referee: Khusravi Siddikzod

11 November 2018 21	Barkchi	0–2	Istiklol	Dushanbe
14:00 (UTC+5)	M.Safarov (yellow card); D.Yodgorov (yellow card)	Report	Boboev 83', 88'; Rakhimov (yellow card), K.Zainiddin (yellow card)	Stadium: Pamir Stadium; Referee: Syedjon Zayniddinov
Note: Match played at the Pamir Stadium in Dushanbe, instead of the Central Stadium in Hisor.

==== League table ====
Pos	Team	Pld	W	D	L	GF	GA	GD	Pts	Qualification or relegation
1	Istiklol (C)	21	16	3	2	36	16	+20	51	Qualification for 2019 AFC Champions League qualifying play-offs
2	Khujand	21	14	4	3	42	20	+22	46	
3	Kuktosh	21	9	3	9	31	32	−1	30	
4	Regar-TadAZ	21	8	4	9	27	26	+1	28	
5	FC Khatlon	21	7	4	10	27	29	−2	25	
6	CSKA Pamir Dushanbe	21	5	9	7	24	33	−9	24	
7	Panjshir	21	4	6	11	16	29	−13	18	Qualification for relegation play-offs
8	Barki Tajik	21	4	1	16	16	34	−18	13	Relegation to Tajik First Division

Source: Fifa
Rules for classification: 1) points; 2) goal difference; 3) number of goals scored.
(C) Champions

=== Tajik Cup ===
24 July 2018 Round of 16 1st leg	Istiklol	1–1	CSKA Pamir Dushanbe	Dushanbe
(UTC+5)	Boboev 14'; Panjshanbe (yellow card)	Report	A.Boronov 72' (yellow card); S.Jalilov (yellow card); M.Abdugafforov (yellow card)	Stadium: Pamir Stadium; Attendance: 150; Referee: Nasriddin Azizov

12 August 2018 Round of 16 2nd leg	CSKA Pamir Dushanbe	2–5 (3–6 agg.)	Istiklol	Dushanbe
(UTC+5)	S.Gafforov 13', 18'; F.Kodirov (yellow card); S.Jalilov (yellow card)	Report	Nazarov 15' (pen.); Vasiev 23'; Abdumominov 59' (yellow card); Babadjanov 70'; Boboev 90+1'; Sulaimonov (yellow card)	Stadium: CSKA Stadium; Attendance: 500; Referee: Behrouz Murtazoev

4 September 2018 Quarterfinal 1st leg	Istiklol	4–3	Lokomotiv Pamir	Dushanbe
(UTC+5)	Boboev 6', 38', 90+4'; Fatkhuloev 60'; Tursunov (yellow card); N.Stošić (yellow card)	Report	S.Rakhmatov 11' (pen.); R.Soirov 24', 31' (yellow card)	Stadium: Pamir Stadium; Attendance: 200; Referee: Murod Kurbonov

8 September 2018 Quarterfinal 2nd leg	Lokomotiv Pamir	0–6 (3–10 agg.)	Istiklol	Dushanbe
(UTC+5)		Report	Abdumominov 19'; Fatkhuloev 28'; Juraboev (penalty missed) 34'; Asrorov 49' (yellow card); Tursunov 62'; Vasiev 69', 90' (yellow card)	Stadium: Aviator Stadium; Attendance: 300; Referee: Amirjon Khorkashev

17 October 2018 Semifinal 1st leg	Istiklol	3–1	Dushanbe-83	Dushanbe
15:00 (UTC+5)	Abdumominov 11'; Babadjanov 55' (pen.); Nazarov 85' (pen.); Juraboev (yellow card); Davlatmir (yellow card)	Report	E.Rashidbekov 60' (pen.); K.Avuku (yellow card); B.Abduahadzoda (yellow card); A.Benjamin (yellow card)	Stadium: Pamir Stadium; Referee: Nasim Khamidov

21 October 2018 Semifinal 2nd leg	Dushanbe-83	3–2 (4–5 agg.)	Istiklol	Dushanbe
(UTC+5)	E.Rashidbekov 36'; C.Avuku 39' (red card) 90+5'; Baranovskyi 58' (o.g.); B.Abduahadzoda (yellow card); A.Khamidov (yellow card)	Report	Baranovskyi 49'; Abdumominov 90+5' (red card) 90+5'; Nazarov (yellow card); Tursunov (yellow card)	Stadium: Pamir Stadium; Attendance: 500; Referee: Abdurashid Murodov

==== Final ====
27 October 2018 Final	Istiklol	1–0	Regar-TadAZ	Vahdat
14:00 (UTC+5)	Tursunov 60'	Report	Abdugafforov (yellow card)	Stadium: Central Stadium; Attendance: 15,000; Referee: Sayojon Zainiddinov

=== AFC Cup ===
==== Group stage ====
Pos	Team	Pld	W	D	L	GF	GA	GD	Pts	Qualification
1	(Turkmenistan) Altyn Asyr	6	4	2	0	17	7	+10	14	Inter-zone play-off semi-finals
2	(Tajikistan) Istiklol	6	4	1	1	10	7	+3	13	
3	(Turkmenistan) Ahal	6	2	1	3	8	5	+3	7	
4	(Kyrgyzstan) Alay Osh	6	0	0	6	7	23	−16	0	

Source: AFC
Rules for classification: Group stage tiebreakers

7 March 2018 1	Istiklol (Tajikistan)	1–0	(Turkmenistan) Ahal	Hisor, Tajikistan
18:00 (UTC+5)	Annageldyýew 25' (o.g.); Boboev (yellow card) 59' (yellow-red card) 86'	Report	Annageldyýew (yellow card) 71'	Stadium: Central Stadium; Attendance: 11,000; Referee: Adel Al Naqbi (United Arab Emirates)

14 March 2018 2	Altyn Asyr (Turkmenistan)	2–2	(Tajikistan) Istiklol	Balkanabat, Turkmenistan
16:30 (UTC+5)	A.Annasähedow (yellow card) 34'; Ýagşyýew 90'; Amanow 90+3'	Report	Fatkhuloev (yellow card) 25'; Zyanko 50'; Nazarov 59' (pen.)	Stadium: Sport Toplumy Stadium; Attendance: 8,600; Referee: Ali Reda (Lebanon)

11 April 2018 3	Istiklol (Tajikistan)	1–0	(Kyrgyzstan) Alay Osh	Hisor, Tajikistan
19:00 (UTC+5)	Fatkhuloev 48' (pen.); Juraboev (yellow card) 85'; Erghashev (yellow card) 90+4'	Report	U.Riskulov (yellow card) 47'; A.Sylla (yellow card) 86'; S.Rakhmonov (yellow card) 90+2'	Stadium: Central Stadium; Attendance: 8,533; Referee: Payam Heidari (Iran)

25 April 2018 4	Alay Osh (Kyrgyzstan)	2–3	(Tajikistan) Istiklol	Osh, Kyrgyzstan
13:00 (UTC+5)	Riskulov 38'; Sylla 76' (pen.); Mahkamov (yellow card) 90+2'	Report	Fatkhuloev 7' (pen.); Jalilov 45'; Vasiev (yellow card) 81' (goal) 90+2'	Stadium: Suyumbayev Stadion; Attendance: 3,800; Referee: Yusuke Araki (Japan)

1 May 2018 5	Ahal (Turkmenistan)	0–1	(Tajikistan) Istiklol	Ashgabat, Turkmenistan
18:00 (UTC+5)	Hajyýew (yellow card) 64'	Report	Jalilov (yellow card) 43'; Fatkhuloev 52'	Stadium: Ashgabat Stadium; Attendance: 18,456; Referee: Jansen Foo (Singapore)

16 May 2018 6	Istiklol (Tajikistan)	2–3	(Turkmenistan) Altyn Asyr	Hisor, Tajikistan
18:00 (UTC+5)	Jalilov (yellow card) 45+3'; Panjshanbe (yellow card) 67'; Zyanko 83'; Nazarov 90+1' (pen.)	Report	Tursunow 1'; Geldiýew (yellow card) 20'; Babajanow 45+4'; M.Titow 90+7' (yellow card) 90+8'	Stadium: Central Stadium; Referee: Omar Al-Yaqoubi (Oman)

== Squad statistics ==
As of match played 11 November 2018

=== Appearances and goals ===
No.	Pos	Nat	Player	Total		Tajik League		Tajik Cup		Super Cup		AFC Cup	
No.	Pos	Nat	Player	Apps	Goals	Apps	Goals	Apps	Goals	Apps	Goals	Apps	Goals
1	GK	(Serbia) SRB	Nikola Stošić	33	0	20	0	6	0	1	0	6	0
2	DF	(Tajikistan) TJK	Siyovush Asrorov	25	1	15+1	0	4	1	1	0	4	0
3	DF	(Tajikistan) TJK	Tabrezi Davlatmir	19	0	11+1	0	4	0	0+1	0	2	0
5	DF	(Ukraine) UKR	Artem Baranovskyi	25	1	12+2	0	3+1	1	1	0	6	0
7	MF	(Uzbekistan) UZB	Jahongir Abdumominov	14	4	8	0	5+1	4	0	0	0	0
11	MF	(Tajikistan) TJK	Muhammadjon Rakhimov	26	2	10+6	2	4	0	1	0	2+3	0
13	MF	(Tajikistan) TJK	Nozim Babadjanov	32	4	6+12	1	5+2	2	0+1	1	4+2	0
14	FW	(Tajikistan) TJK	Sheriddin Boboev	29	16	15+5	12	3+1	4	0+1	0	1+3	0
17	FW	(Tajikistan) TJK	Dilshod Vasiev	34	11	10+11	6	6+1	4	1	0	1+4	1
18	MF	(Tajikistan) TJK	Fatkhullo Fatkhuloev	31	9	18+1	4	5	2	1	0	6	3
19	DF	(Tajikistan) TJK	Akhtam Nazarov	35	6	19+2	2	7	2	1	0	6	2
20	MF	(Tajikistan) TJK	Amirbek Juraboev	33	1	19+1	1	7	0	1	0	5	0
23	MF	(Tajikistan) TJK	Ehson Panjshanbe	24	1	15+1	1	2	0	0	0	4+2	0
27	DF	(Tajikistan) TJK	Alisher Sharipov	5	0	4	0	1	0	0	0	0	0
28	FW	(Tajikistan) TJK	Komron Tursunov	24	4	9+7	2	5+1	2	0+1	0	0+1	0
35	GK	(Russia) RUS	Rustam Yatimov	3	0	1	0	1+1	0	0	0	0	0
70	MF	(Tajikistan) TJK	Shakhrom Sulaimonov	17	0	10	0	7	0	0	0	0	0
Youth team players:
	DF	(Tajikistan) TJK	Amir Nigmatov	2	0	0	0	0+2	0	0	0	0	0
	DF	(Tajikistan) TJK	Shahbol Rajabov	1	0	1	0	0	0	0	0	0	0
	DF	(Tajikistan) TJK	Khurshedi Zainiddin	2	0	1	0	1	0	0	0	0	0
	MF	(Tajikistan) TJK	Farhod Kosimov	3	0	1+1	0	1	0	0	0	0	0
	FW	(Afghanistan) AFG	Hamid Golami	1	0	0+1	0	0	0	0	0	0	0
Players away from Istiklol on loan:
Players who left Istiklol during the season:
6	DF	(Tajikistan) TJK	Davron Erghashev	11	0	5	0	0	0	0	0	5+1	0
7	MF	(Belarus) BLR	Sergey Tikhonovsky	6	0	2+1	0	0	0	1	0	2	0
9	FW	(Belarus) BLR	Mikalay Zyanko	15	5	7+1	2	0	0	1	1	6	2
21	MF	(Tajikistan) TJK	Romish Jalilov	16	3	9	2	0	0	1	0	6	1
33	DF	(Ukraine) UKR	Oleksandr Garbar	2	0	2	0	0	0	0	0	0	0

=== Goal scorers ===
Place	Position	Nation	Number	Name	Tajik League	Tajik Cup	Super Cup	AFC Cup	Total
1	FW	(Tajikistan)	14	Sheriddin Boboev	12	4	0	0	16
2	FW	(Tajikistan)	17	Dilshod Vasiev	6	4	0	1	11
3	MF	(Tajikistan)	18	Fatkhullo Fatkhuloev	4	2	0	3	9
4	DF	(Tajikistan)	19	Akhtam Nazarov	2	2	0	2	6
5	FW	(Belarus)	9	Mikalay Zyanko	2	0	1	2	5
6	FW	(Tajikistan)	28	Komron Tursunov	2	2	0	0	4
6	MF	(Tajikistan)	13	Nozim Babadjanov	1	2	1	0	4
6	MF	(Uzbekistan)	7	Jahongir Abdumominov	0	4	0	0	4
9	MF	(Tajikistan)	21	Romish Jalilov	2	0	0	1	3
9				Own goal	1	0	1	1	3
11	MF	(Tajikistan)	11	Muhammadjon Rakhimov	2	0	0	0	2
12	MF	(Tajikistan)	23	Ehson Panjshanbe	1	0	0	0	1
12	MF	(Tajikistan)	20	Amirbek Juraboev	1	0	0	0	1
12	DF	(Tajikistan)	2	Siyovush Asrorov	0	1	0	0	1
12	DF	(Ukraine)	5	Artem Baranovskyi	0	1	0	0	1
				TOTALS	36	22	3	10	71

=== Disciplinary record ===
Number	Nation	Position	Name	Tajik League		Tajik Cup		Super Cup		AFC Cup		Total	
Number	Nation	Position	Name	Booked	Sent off (straight red)	Booked	Sent off (straight red)	Booked	Sent off (straight red)	Booked	Sent off (straight red)	Booked	Sent off (straight red)
1	(Serbia)	GK	Nikola Stošić	0	0	1	0	0	0	0	0	1	0
2	(Tajikistan)	DF	Siyovush Asrorov	4	0	1	0	0	0	0	0	5	0
3	(Tajikistan)	DF	Tabrezi Davlatmir	1	1	1	0	0	0	0	0	2	1
5	(Ukraine)	DF	Artem Baranovskyi	1	0	0	0	0	0	0	0	1	0
7	(Uzbekistan)	MF	Jahongir Abdumominov	2	0	1	1	0	0	0	0	3	1
11	(Tajikistan)	MF	Muhammadjon Rakhimov	6	0	0	0	0	0	0	0	6	0
13	(Tajikistan)	MF	Nozim Babadjanov	2	0	0	0	0	0	0	0	2	0
14	(Tajikistan)	FW	Sheriddin Boboev	1	0	0	0	0	0	2	1	3	1
17	(Tajikistan)	FW	Dilshod Vasiev	0	0	1	0	0	0	1	0	2	0
18	(Tajikistan)	MF	Fatkhullo Fatkhuloev	6	0	0	0	0	0	1	0	7	0
19	(Tajikistan)	DF	Akhtam Nazarov	3	0	1	0	1	0	0	0	5	0
20	(Tajikistan)	MF	Amirbek Juraboev	3	0	1	0	0	0	1	0	5	0
23	(Tajikistan)	MF	Ehson Panjshanbe	8	0	1	0	0	0	1	0	10	0
28	(Tajikistan)	FW	Komron Tursunov	1	0	2	0	0	0	0	0	3	0
70	(Tajikistan)	MF	Shakhrom Sulaimonov	2	0	1	0	0	0	0	0	3	0
	(Tajikistan)	DF	Khurshedi Zainiddin	1	0	0	0	0	0	0	0	1	0
Players who left Istiklol during the season:
6	(Tajikistan)	DF	Davron Erghashev	3	2	0	0	0	0	1	0	4	2
7	(Belarus)	MF	Sergey Tikhonovsky	1	0	0	0	0	0	0	0	1	0
9	(Belarus)	FW	Mikalay Zyanko	1	0	0	0	0	0	0	0	1	0
21	(Tajikistan)	MF	Romish Jalilov	2	0	0	0	0	0	2	0	4	0
33	(Ukraine)	DF	Oleksandr Garbar	1	0	0	0	0	0	0	0	1	0
			TOTALS	50	2	11	1	1	0	9	1	71	4
