= Sergey Tikhonovsky =

Belarusian footballer

Personal information
- Full name: Sergey Ivanovich Tikhonovsky
- Date of birth: 26 June 1990 (age 36)
- Place of birth: Sloboda, Smolevichi Raion, Belarusian SSR
- Height: 1.75 m (5 ft 9 in)
- Position: Midfielder

Team information
- Current team: Vitebsk
- Number: 26

Youth career
- 2007–2009: BATE Borisov

Senior career*
Years	Team	Apps	(Gls)
2010	Rudensk	19	(4)
2011–2012	Torpedo-BelAZ Zhodino	32	(0)
2013	Bereza-2010	19	(3)
2014	Dnepr Mogilev	15	(0)
2015	Slavia Mozyr	18	(0)
2016–2017	Vitebsk	49	(2)
2018	Istiklol	3	(0)
2018–2019	Gorodeya	17	(1)
2019–2020	Rukh Brest	31	(0)
2021	Dinamo Brest	26	(0)
2022	Kyzylzhar	18	(0)
2023–2024	Slavia Mozyr	34	(0)
2025–	Vitebsk	35	(2)
- * Club domestic league appearances and goals as of 3 July 2026

Sergey Ivanovich Tikhonovsky (Belarusian: Сяргей Іванавіч Ціханоўскi; Russian: Сергей Иванович Тихоновский; born 26 June 1990) is a Belarusian footballer who plays for Vitebsk.

== Career statistics ==
=== Club ===
As of match played 24 May 2018

Club	Season	League			National Cup		Continental		Other		Total	
Club	Season	Division	Apps	Goals	Apps	Goals	Apps	Goals	Apps	Goals	Apps	Goals
Vitebsk	2016	Belarusian Premier League	28	1	2	0	-		-		33	5
Vitebsk	2017	Belarusian Premier League	21	1	2	0	-		-		21	1
Vitebsk	Total		49	2	4	0	-	-	-	-	53	2
Istiklol	2018	Tajik League	3	0	0	0	2	0	1	0	6	0
Career total			52	2	4	0	2	0	1	0	59	2

== Honors ==
Istiklol

- Tajikistan Football League champion: 2018
- Tajik Supercup winner: 2018
