= 2018 Tajikistan Cup =

2018 Tajik Cup
Tournament details
- Country: Tajikistan

Final positions
- Champions: Istiklol
- Runners-up: Regar-TadAZ Tursunzoda

The 2018 Tajik Cup is the 27th edition of the Tajik Cup, the knockout football tournament of Tajikistan. The cup winner qualifies for the 2019 AFC Cup.

== Preliminary round ==
The draw of the preliminary round was held on 28 April 2018.

First legs: 1–2 May; Second legs: 17–18 May.

"Isfara" - "Parvoz" (1/5) 3:3 (17/5) 3:2 (agg) 5:4

"Hulbuk" - "Saroykamar" (awd.) 0:3

"Ravshan" - "Vahdat" (1/5) 0:3 (17/5) 1:1 (agg) 1:4

"Dusty" - "Dushanbe-83" (1/5) 1:1 (17/5) 0:4 (agg) 1:5

"Shokhin" - "Somon" (1/5) 1:1 (17/5) 2:6 (agg) 3:7

"Istravshan" - "Eshata" (2/5) 2:1 (18/5) 1:1 (agg) 3:2

"Faizkand" - "Zarafshon" (2/5) 3:2 (18/5) 3:1 (agg) 6:3

"Lokomotiv-Pamir" Bye

== Round of 16 ==
The draw for the main rounds was held on 25 May 2018.

24 July 2018 1st leg	Istiklol	1–1	CSKA Pamir Dushanbe	Dushanbe
(UTC+5)				Stadium: Pamir Stadium

12 August 2018 2nd leg	CSKA Pamir Dushanbe	2–5 (3–6 agg.)	Istiklol	Dushanbe
(UTC+5)				Stadium: CSKA Stadium

24 July 2018 1st leg	Lokomotiv Pamir	4–2	Isfara	Dushanbe
(UTC+5)

30 July 2018 2nd leg	Isfara	2–1 (4–5 agg.)	Lokomotiv Pamir	Isfara
(UTC+5)

23 July 2018 1st leg	Panjshir	2–2	Faizkand	Kolkhozobod
(UTC+5)				Stadium: Panjshir Uktam Mamatova

12 August 2018 2nd leg	Faizkand	0–0 (2–2 agg.)	Panjshir
(UTC+5)

25 July 2018 1st leg	Dushanbe-83	2–1	Saroykamar	Dushanbe
(UTC+5)

5 August 2018 2nd leg	Saroykamar	3–2 (a.e.t.) (4–4 agg.)	Dushanbe-83
(UTC+5)

23 July 2018 1st leg	Khatlon	0–0	Khayr Vahdat	Dushanbe
(UTC+5)

12 August 2018 2nd leg	Khayr Vahdat	1–1 (1–1 agg.)	Khatlon
(UTC+5)

24 July 2018 1st leg	Regar-TadAZ Tursunzoda	1–0	Istaravshan	Tursunzoda
(UTC+5)				Stadium: TALCO Arena

12 August 2018 2nd leg	Istaravshan	2–1 (2–2 agg.)	Regar-TadAZ Tursunzoda
(UTC+5)

24 July 2018 1st leg	Barkchi	3–2	Kuktosh	Hisor
(UTC+5)				Stadium: Central Stadium

11 August 2018 2nd leg	Kuktosh	1–1 (3–4 agg.)	Barkchi
(UTC+5)

24 July 2018 1st leg	Somon	1–4	Khujand	Dushanbe
(UTC+5)

12 August 2018 2nd leg	Khujand	3–0 (7–1 agg.)	Somon	Khujand
(UTC+5)				Stadium: 20 Years of Independence Stadium

== Quarter-finals ==
4 September 2018 1st leg	Istiklol	4–3	Lokomotiv Pamir

8 September 2018 2nd leg	Lokomotiv Pamir	0–6 (3–10 agg.)	Istiklol

27 August 2018 1st leg	Faizkand	0–1	Dushanbe-83

10 September 2018 2nd leg	Dushanbe-83	1–0 (2–0 agg.)	Faizkand

23 August 2018 1st leg	Khatlon	0–3	Regar-TadAZ Tursunzoda

26 September 2018 2nd leg	Regar-TadAZ Tursunzoda	5–1 (8–1 agg.)	Khatlon

23 August 2018 1st leg	Barkchi	0–2	Khujand

16 September 2018 2nd leg	Khujand	0–2 (2–2 agg.) (4–2 p)	Barkchi

== Semi-finals ==
17 October 2018 1st leg	Istiklol	3–1	Dushanbe-83
		Report

21 October 2018 2nd leg	Dushanbe-83	3–2 (4–5 agg.)	Istiklol
		Report

17 October 2018 1st leg	Regar-TadAZ Tursunzoda	0–1	Khujand
		Report

21 October 2018 2nd leg	Khujand	1–2 (2–2 agg.)	Regar-TadAZ Tursunzoda
		Report

== Final ==
27 October 2018	Istiklol	1–0	Regar-TadAZ Tursunzoda	Vahdat
14:00 TJT	Tursunov 60'			Stadium: Central Stadium; Attendance: 15,145; Referee: Sayojon Zainiddinov

== See also ==
- 2018 Tajik League
