= Jahongir Abdumominov =

Uzbek footballer

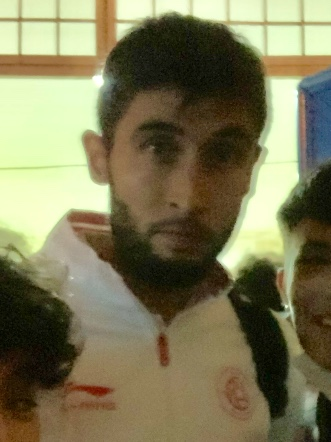

Personal information
- Full name: Jahongir Abdumominov
- Date of birth: 9 February 1993 (age 33)
- Place of birth: Muborak, Uzbekistan
- Height: 1.85 m (6 ft 1 in)
- Position: Defensive midfielder

Youth career
- 2007–2010: Mash'al Mubarek

Senior career*
Years	Team	Apps	(Gls)
2010–2014	Mash'al Mubarek	46	(4)
2014–2015	Olmaliq	24	(4)
2015–2016	Metallurg Bekabad	52	(4)
2016–2017	Sogdiana Jizzakh	8	(1)
2017–2018	Istiklol	8	(0)
2018–2019	Persija Jakarta	10	(0)
2019–2020	Buxoro	9	(0)
2020	Andijon	7	(0)
2020–2021	Lokomotiv Tashkent	11	(0)
2021–2024	The Cong-Viettel	67	(3)
2024–2025	Hanoi FC	5	(0)

International career^{‡}
2012	Uzbekistan	2	(0)
- * Club domestic league appearances and goals as of 14 February 2019 ‡ National team caps and goals as of 20 October 2018

Jahongir Abdumominov (born 9 February 1993), also known as Jaha, is an Uzbek professional footballer who plays as a defensive midfielder.

== Club career ==
On 19 July 2018, Jaha signed a one-year contract with FC Istiklol.

On 11 January 2019, Jaha signed a one-year contract with Persija Jakarta. In mid-February, it was announced that his contract was terminated because the club weren't convinced by his performances throughout the pre-season. Abdumominov then joined FK Buxoro for the 2019 season.

On 27 January 2021, Jaha signed a contract with Viettel after being quarantined for two weeks according to regulations to combat the COVID-19 pandemic. He made his debut for the club in a 3–1 victory against Becamex Binh Duong in the V.League 1.

On 27 September 2024, Jaha signed for V.League 1 fellow Hanoi FC as a free agent.

== International career ==
On 13 August 2012, Jaha made his international debut with Uzbekistan in a friendly against Jordan.

== Career statistics ==
=== Club ===
As of match played 18 November 2018

Appearances and goals by club, season and competition
Club	Season	League			National Cup		Continental		Other		Total	
Club	Season	Division	Apps	Goals	Apps	Goals	Apps	Goals	Apps	Goals	Apps	Goals
Olmaliq	2015	Uzbekistan Super League	24	4	0	0	—		—		24	4
Metallurg Bekabad	2016	Uzbekistan Super League	27	2	4	0	—		—		31	2
Metallurg Bekabad	2017	Uzbekistan Super League	25	2	0	0	—		—		25	2
Sogdiana Jizzakh	2018	Uzbekistan Super League	8	1	0	0	—		—		8	1
Istiklol	2018	Tajikistan Football League	8	0	6	4	0	0	0	0	14	4
Career total			92	9	10	4	0	0	0	0	102	13

=== International ===
As of match played 15 August 2012

Appearances and goals by national team and year
National team	Year	Apps	Goals
Uzbekistan	2012	2	0
Total		2	0

== Honours ==
Istiklol

- Tajik League:2018
- Tajik Cup:2018

Viettel FC

- Vietnamese Cup runner-up: 2023
