= Behrouz Hayriev =

Tajikstani footballer

Personal information
- Date of birth: 1 May 1998 (age 28)
- Place of birth: Nurak, Tajikistan
- Position: Defender

Senior career*
Years	Team	Apps	(Gls)
2017	Barki Tajik		
2018–2019	Istiklol	0	(0)
2019	Kuktosh Rudaki	0	(0)

International career^{‡}
2016	Tajikistan U19	4	(0)
2018–	Tajikistan	1	(0)
- * Club domestic league appearances and goals as of 15:33, 28 February 2019 (UTC) ‡ National team caps and goals as of 12:38, 15 December 2018 (UTC)

Behrouz Hayriev (born 1 May 1998) is a Tajikistani professional football player who last played for Kuktosh Rudaki.

== Career ==
=== Club ===
In February 2018, Hayriev joined FC Istiklol on trial, before joining the club permanently.

On 28 February 2019, Hayriev's contract with Istiklol was terminated by mutual consent.

=== International ===
Hayriev made his senior team debut on 12 October 2018 against Palestine.

== Career statistics ==
=== Club ===
As of match played 7 November 2018

Club	Season	League			National Cup		Continental		Other		Total	
Club	Season	Division	Apps	Goals	Apps	Goals	Apps	Goals	Apps	Goals	Apps	Goals
Istiklol	2018	Tajik League	0	0	0	0	0	0	0	0	0	0
Istiklol	2019	Tajik League	0	0	0	0	0	0	0	0	0	0
Istiklol	Total		0	0	0	0	0	0	0	0	0	0
Career total			0	0	0	0	0	0	0	0	0	0

=== International ===
Tajikistan national team
Year	Apps	Goals
2018	1	0
Total	1	0

Statistics accurate as of match played 12 October 2018
