= Sheriddin Boboev =

Tajikistani footballer

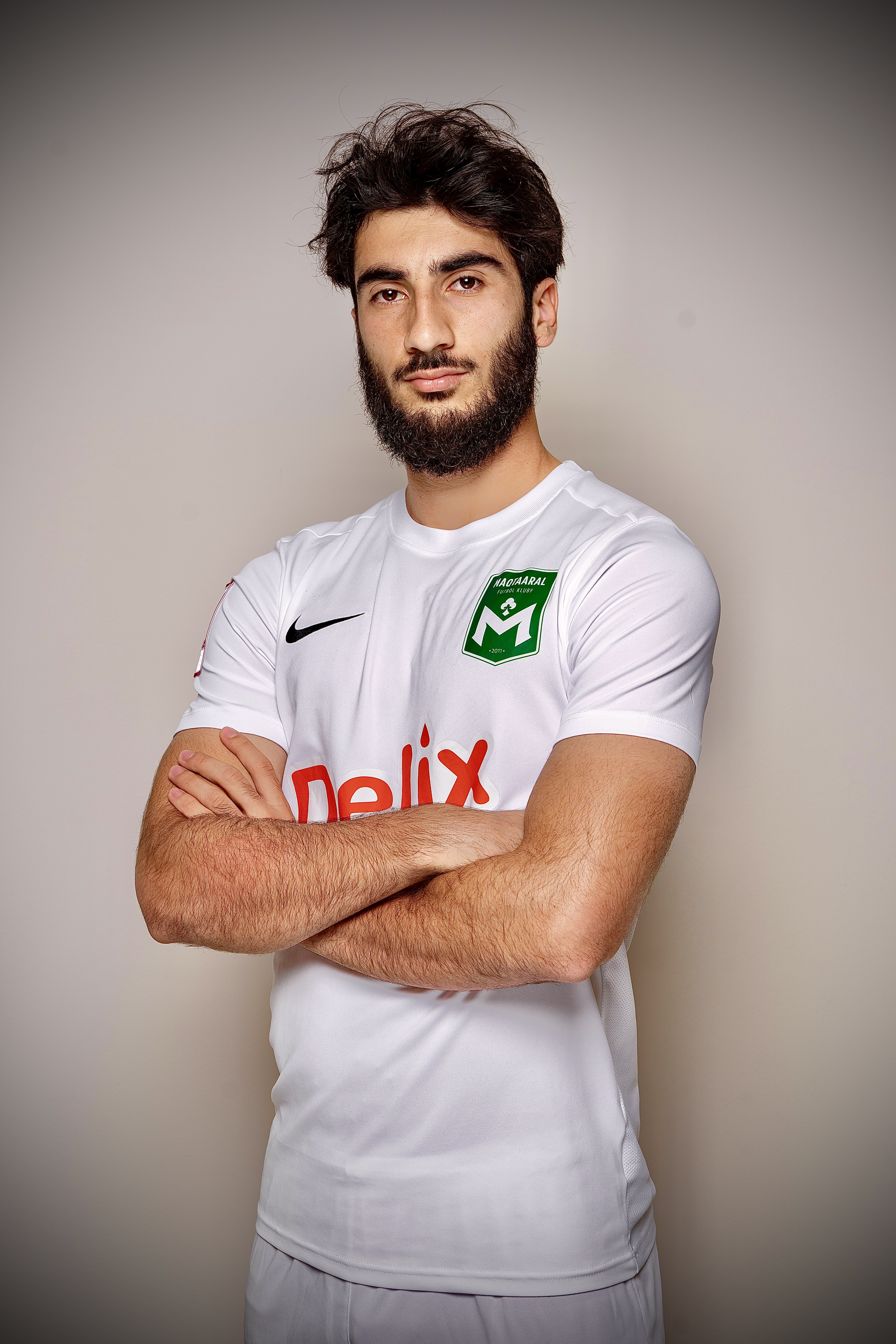

Personal information
- Full name: Sheriddin Zoirovich Boboev
- Date of birth: 21 April 1999 (age 27)
- Place of birth: Dushanbe, Tajikistan
- Height: 1.80 m (5 ft 11 in)
- Position: Forward

Team information
- Current team: PSM Makassar
- Number: 21

Senior career*
Years	Team	Apps	(Gls)
2015–2020	Istiklol	64	(40)
2017	→ Barkchi (loan)	20	(5)
2021	Penang	22	(6)
2022	Maktaaral	10	(0)
2022–2023	Sanat Naft Abadan	7	(1)
2024	Khosilot Farkhor	22	(8)
2025	Ravshan Kulob	19	(7)
2026–	PSM Makassar	11	(2)

International career^{‡}
2017–	Tajikistan	34	(8)
- * Club domestic league appearances and goals as of 23 May 2026 ‡ National team caps and goals as of 14 November 2026

Sheriddin Zoirovich Boboev (Tajik: Шериддин Зоирович Бобоев, Russian: ‌Шериддин Зоирович Бобоев) is a Tajikistani professional footballer who plays as a forward for PSM Makassar and the Tajikistan national team.

== Club career ==
In February 2017, Boboev joined Barkchi on loan for the 2017 season.

On 14 December 2020, Istiklol announced that Boboev would continue his career with Malaysia Super League club Penang.

On 2 March, Maktaaral announced the signing of Boboev. Boboev left Maktaaral on 14 July 2022.

In January 2026, Boboev joined Indonesian Super League club PSM Makassar.

== International career ==
Boboev made his debut for Tajikistan on 10 October 2017 against Nepal.

He scored his first international goal on 7 July 2019 against India during the 2019 Intercontinental Cup at The Arena.

On 31 March 2026, during the final match against Philippines in the 2027 AFC Asian Cup qualification, Boboev scored an equaliser which puts his team above in the standings based on goal difference to qualify for the tournament.

== Career statistics ==
=== Club ===
As of match played 20 October 2022

Club	Season	League			National Cup		Continental		Other		Total	
Club	Season	Division	Apps	Goals	Apps	Goals	Apps	Goals	Apps	Goals	Apps	Goals
Istiklol	2015	Tajikistan Higher League	1	0	0	0	0	0	0	0	1	0
Istiklol	2016	Tajikistan Higher League	5	2	3	2	0	0	0	0	8	4
Istiklol	2017	Tajikistan Higher League	0	0	0	0	0	0	0	0	0	0
Istiklol	2018	Tajikistan Higher League	20	12	4	4	4	0	1	0	29	16
Istiklol	2019	Tajikistan Higher League	21	16	6	4	5	1	0	0	32	21
Istiklol	2020	Tajikistan Higher League	17	10	1	2	3	0	1	0	22	12
Istiklol	Total		64	40	14	12	12	1	2	0	92	53
Barkchi (loan)	2017	Tajikistan Higher League	21	5	4	2	-		-		25	7
Penang	2021	Malaysia Super League	22	6	0	0	-		-		22	6
Maktaaral	2022	Kazakhstan Premier League	10	0	0	0	-		-		10	0
Sanat Naft Abadan	2022–23	Persian Gulf Pro League	7	0	0	0	-		-		7	0
Career total			124	51	18	14	12	1	2	0	156	66

=== International ===
Tajikistan national team
Year	Apps	Goals
2017	1	0
2018	3	0
2019	11	1
2020	2	0
2021	5	1
2022	1	0
2025	4	1
2026	7	5
Total	34	8

=== International goals ===
Scores and results list Tajikistan's goal tally first.

#	Date	Venue	Opponent	Score	Result	Competition
1.	7 July 2019	The Arena, Ahmedabad, India	India	2–2	4–2	2019 Intercontinental Cup
2.	15 June 2021	Yanmar Stadium, Osaka, Japan	Myanmar	3–0	4–0	2022 FIFA World Cup qualification
3.	18 November 2025	Territory Rugby League Stadium, Darwin, Australia	Timor-Leste	5–0	5–0	2027 AFC Asian Cup qualification
4.	31 March 2026	Hisor Central Stadium, Hisor, Tajikistan	Philippines	1–1	1–1	2027 AFC Asian Cup qualification
5.	5 June 2026	TALCO Arena, Tursunzoda, Tajikistan	India	1–0	3–1	Friendly
6.	9 June 2026	Hisor Central Stadium, Hisor, Tajikistan	India	1–1	1–1	Friendly
7.	28 September 2026	Tongliang Long Stadium, Chongqing, China	Palestine	1–0	4–2	Friendly
8.	14 November 2026	Sisaket Province Stadium, Sisaket, Thailand	Oman	1–0	1–0	2026 King's Cup

== Honours ==
=== Club ===
Istiklol

- Tajik League (4): 2017, 2018 2019, 2020
- Tajik Cup (2):2018, 2019
- Tajik Supercup (2): 2018, 2020

== Personal life ==
Sheriddin Boboev is the first player in the Kazakhstan Premier League to have NFT. Boboev's official NFT was released in April 2022.
