= 2018 Tajik League =

Tajik League
- Season: 2018
- Champions: FC Istiklol
- AFC Champions League: FC Istiklol
- Matches: 84
- Goals: 219 (2.61 per match)

The 2018 Tajik League is the 27th season of Tajik League, Tajikistan's top division of association football. The season began on 10 March 2018.

== Teams ==
On 8 February 2017, the Tajikistan Football Federation announced that the season would involve eight teams, with Khayr Vahdat, Parvoz and Ravshan dropping out of the league, and Panjshir gaining promotion.

Locations of teams in the 2018 Tajik League

Team	Location	Venue	Capacity
Barkchi	Hisor	Central Stadium	24,000
CSKA Pomir Dushanbe	Dushanbe	CSKA Stadium	7,000
Istiklol	Dushanbe	Central Republican Stadium	24,000
FC Khatlon	Kulob	Central Stadium	
Khujand	Khujand	20-Letie Nezavisimosti Stadium	20,000
Kuktosh	Rudaki	Rudaki Stadium	
Panjshir	Balkh	Panjshir Uktam Mamatova	8,500
Regar-TadAZ	Tursunzoda	Stadium Metallurg 1st District	20,000

=== Managerial changes ===
Team	Outgoing manager	Manner of departure	Date of vacancy	Position in table	Incoming manager	Date of appointment
Istiklol	(Tajikistan) Mukhsin Mukhamadiev	Mutual Consent	22 May 2018	2nd	(Tajikistan) Alisher Tukhtaev	22 May 2018
Panjshir				7th	(Tajikistan) Rustam Khojayev	21 August 2018

== League table ==
Pos	Team	Pld	W	D	L	GF	GA	GD	Pts	Qualification or relegation
1	Istiklol (C)	21	16	3	2	36	16	+20	51	Qualification for 2019 AFC Champions League qualifying play-offs
2	Khujand	21	14	4	3	42	20	+22	46	
3	Kuktosh	21	9	3	9	31	32	−1	30	
4	Regar-TadAZ	21	8	4	9	27	26	+1	28	
5	FC Khatlon	21	7	4	10	27	29	−2	25	
6	CSKA Pamir Dushanbe	21	5	9	7	24	33	−9	24	
7	Panjshir	21	4	6	11	16	29	−13	18	Qualification for relegation play-offs
8	Barki Tajik	21	4	1	16	16	34	−18	13	Relegation to Tajik First Division

Source: Fifa
Rules for classification: 1) points; 2) goal difference; 3) number of goals scored.
(C) Champions

=== Results 1–14 ===
Home \ Away	BTD	CPD	IST	KHA	KJD	KUK	PAN	RZD
Barkchi		0–1	0–1	1–0	0–1	2–3	1–2	0–0
CSKA Pamir	1–0		1–2	2–1	3–3	0–0	0–0	0–3
Istiklol	2–1	3–3		3–1	1–0	2–0	1–0	2–1
Khatlon	1–0	0–1	1–3		1–2	1–1	1–0	2–0
Khujand	3–1	4–0	4–3	2–1		2–0	4–0	2–1
Kuktosh	1–0	2–1	0–2	4–2	1–3		3–2	1–1
Panjshir	2–0	1–1	0–0	1–1	0–0	1–2		0–2
Regar-TadAZ	2–1	2–2	1–2	1–3	1–1	1–0	3–1	

Updated to match(es) played on 10 June 2018. Source: Soccerway
Legend: Blue = home team win; Yellow = draw; Red = away team win.

=== Results 15–21 ===
Home \ Away	BTD	CPD	IST	KHA	KJD	KUK	PAN	RZD
Barkchi		2–1	0–2			1–3		3–2
CSKA Pamir				3–3			1–1	0–2
Istiklol		0–1			1–0			2–0
Khatlon	1–2		1–1		4–2	1–0		
Khujand	3–0	0–0				3–1		
Kuktosh		4–2	2–3				2–0	1–2
Panjshir	2–1		0–2	2–0	1–2			
Regar-TadAZ				0–2	0–1		2–0	

Updated to match(es) played on 11 November 2018. Source: Soccerway
Legend: Blue = home team win; Yellow = draw; Red = away team win.

== Relegation play-offs ==
The 2018 season ended with a relegation play-off between the 7th-placed Tajik League team, Panjshir and the runners-up of the Tajik First Division, Eskhata, on a two-legged confrontation.

18 November 2018

Eskhata	2–6	Panjshir
Bohirjon Sanginov 45+1'; Juraboy Isoev 76'	Report	Eyja Edward 23'; Shavkat Khudoynazarov 39'; Ravshandzhon Azizov 43'; Sorbon Avgonov 52', 81'; Saidakbar Yunusov 90+1'

20 Years of Independence Stadium, Khujand
Attendance: 600
Referee: Gulmurodi Sadullo

22 November 2018

Panjshir	5–2	Eskhata
Khayriddin Turakhonov 12'; Alisher Salimov 37', 47'; Saidakbar Yunusov 80', 86'	Report	Jurabah Isoev 9'; Alisher Hotham 42' (o.g.)

Uktam Mamatova Stadium, Kolkhozobod
Attendance: 3,000
Referee: Sayojon Zainiddinov

Panjshir won 11–4 on aggregate and therefore both clubs remained in their respective leagues.

== Matches ==
=== Week 1 ===
10 March 2018	Khatlon	1–3	Istiklol	Hisor
16:30 (UTC+5)	Navruz Rustamov 85' (pen.)	Report	Boboev 10', 37'; Komron Tursunov 45'	Stadium: Central Stadium; Attendance: 200; Referee: Abdurashid Murodov

11 March 2018	CSKA Pamir Dushanbe	3–3	Khujand	Dushanbe
(UTC+5)	Shodibek Gafforov 11'; Abdukhalil Boronov 75'; Sharafjon Solekhov 79'	Report	Ergashev 22'; Ahmadov 35' (pen.); Tukhtasunov 38'	Stadium: Central Republican Stadium; Attendance: 400; Referee: Nekruz Umarov

11 March 2018	Barkchi	0–0	Regar-TadAZ	Hisor
(UTC+5)		Report		Stadium: Central Stadium; Attendance: 300; Referee: Khurshed Dadoboev

12 March 2018	Panjshir	1–2	Kuktosh	Hisor
(UTC+5)	Khayriddin Turakhonov 69'	Report	Prince Arthur 27'; Idan Okran 28'	Stadium: Central Stadium; Attendance: 1,000; Referee: Gulmurody Sadullo

=== Week 2 ===
16 March 2018	Khujand	2–1	Khatlon	Khujand
13:30 (UTC+5)	Tukhtasunov 38'; Ahmadov 67' (pen.)	Report	Navruz Rustamov 90+3' (pen.)	Stadium: 20 Years of Independence Stadium; Attendance: 1,500; Referee: Behrouz Murtazoev

17 March 2018	Panjshir	1–1	CSKA Pamir Dushanbe	Dushanbe
13:30 (UTC+5)	Farrukh Fusailov 61'	Report	Abdukhalil Boronov 90+3'	Stadium: Central Republican Stadium; Attendance: 800; Referee: Nasrullo Kabirov

18 March 2018	Kuktosh	1–1	Regar-TadAZ	Hisor
13:30 (UTC+5)	Muhammadsharifi Saidhodja 35'	Report	Firuz Karaev 32'	Stadium: Central Stadium; Attendance: 1,000; Referee: Sayvali Turdiyev

6 May 2018	Istiklol	2–1	Barkchi	Dushanbe
19:00 (UTC+5)	Fatkhuloev 28'; Boboev 55'	Report	Vakhdat Khanonov 65'	Stadium: Central Republican Stadium; Attendance: 300; Referee: Khusrawi Siddiqzod

=== Week 3 ===
31 March 2017	CSKA Pamir Dushanbe	0–0	Kuktosh	Dushanbe
15:30 (UTC+5)		Report		Stadium: Central Republican Stadium; Attendance: 1,500; Referee: Abdurashid Murodov

31 March 2017	Khatlon	1–0	Panjshir	Kulob
15:30 (UTC+5)	Navruz Rustamov 65'	Report		Stadium: Central Stadium; Attendance: 1,000; Referee: Khurshed Dadoboev

1 April 2017	Barkchi	0–1	Khujand	Hisor
(UTC+5)		Report	Tukhtasunov 69'	Stadium: Central Stadium; Attendance: 500; Referee: Gulmurody Sadullo

1 April 2017	Istiklol	2–1	Regar-TadAZ	Hisor
(UTC+5)	Boboev 15'; Panjshanbe 31'	Report	Khairullo Azizov 69'	Stadium: Central Stadium; Attendance: 500; Referee: Sayojon Zainiddinov

=== Week 4 ===
4 April 2018	Kuktosh	0–2	Istiklol	Hisor
(UTC+5)		Report	F.Safarzoda 18' (o.g.); Jalilov 26'	Stadium: Central Stadium; Attendance: 1,000; Referee: Nekruz Umarov

7 April 2018	Panjshir	2–0	Barkchi	Hisor
(UTC+5)	Alisheri Hotam 15', 48'	Report		Stadium: Central Stadium; Attendance: 3,000; Referee: Sayojon Zainiddinov

8 April 2018	Khujand	2–1	Regar-TadAZ	Khujand
(UTC+5)	Ergashev 18'; Dilshod Bozorov 65'	Report	Saidamri Saidahmad 32'	Stadium: 20 Years of Independence Stadium; Attendance: 4,000; Referee: Sayvali Turdiyev

8 April 2018	CSKA Pamir Dushanbe	2–1	Khatlon	Hisor
(UTC+5)	Muhammad Alipur 77', 84'	Report	Holmurod Nazarov 9'	Stadium: Central Stadium; Attendance: 100; Referee: Behrouz Murtazoev

=== Week 5 ===
13 April 2018	Khatlon	1–1	Kuktosh	Kulob
16:00 (UTC+5)	Naim Ibrahimzoda 21'	Report	Idan Ocran 48'	Stadium: Central Stadium; Attendance: 700; Referee: Nasrullo Kabirov

14 April 2018	Regar-TadAZ	3–1	Panjshir	Tursunzoda
16:00 (UTC+5)	Saidhoni Amrohon 17'; Akbar Bobomurodov 84'; Numon Zokirov 88'	Report	Hayriddin Turakhonov 54'	Stadium: TALCO Arena; Attendance: 1,200; Referee: Gulmurodi Sadullo

14 April 2018	Istiklol	1–0	Khujand	Hisor
16:00 (UTC+5)	Vasiev 77'	Report		Stadium: Central Stadium; Attendance: 200; Referee: Sayojon Zainiddinov

18 April 2018	Barkchi	0–1	CSKA Pamir Dushanbe	Hisor
16:00 (UTC+5)		Report	Rasul Paizov 25'	Stadium: Central Stadium; Attendance: 200; Referee: Sayvali Turdiyev

=== Week 6 ===
18 April 2018	Panjshir	0–0	Istiklol	Kolkhozobod
17:30 (UTC+5)		Report		Stadium: Panjshir Uktam Mamatova; Attendance: 4,000; Referee: Aburashid Murodov

22 April 2018	CSKA Pamir Dushanbe	0–3	Regar-TadAZ	Hisor
(UTC+5)		Report	Dorogjon Ergashev 32'; Khairullo Azizov 66'; Amirjon Safarov 80'	Stadium: Central Stadium; Attendance: 400; Referee: Nasrullo Kabirov

22 April 2018	Khatlon	1–0	Barkchi	Kulob
(UTC+5)	Navruz Rustamov 64' (pen.)	Report		Stadium: Central Stadium; Attendance: 800; Referee: Khurshed Dadoboev

6 May 2018	Kuktosh	1–3	Khujand	Neftyanik
(UTC+5)	Shokhnazar Nazarov 28'	Report	Choriyev 6'; Ergashev 32'; Khurshed Beknazarov 50'	Stadium: Rudaki Stadium; Attendance: 5,000; Referee: Nekruz Umarov

=== Week 7 ===
29 April 2018	Barkchi	2–3	Kuktosh	Hisor
(UTC+5)	Saidmukhtor Azimov 38'; Athamjon Abdulloev 50'	Report	Nodirbek Ibrokhimov 25'; Abdurasul Rakhmonov 43'; Muhammadsharifi Saidkhodja 73'	Stadium: Central Stadium; Attendance: 800; Referee: Gulmurody Sadullo

29 April 2018	Khujand	4–0	Panjshir	Khujand
(UTC+5)	Dilshod Bozorov 19'; Tokhirov 58'; Ergashev 73', 77'	Report		Stadium: 20 Years of Independence Stadium; Attendance: 1,300; Referee: Nasrullo Kabirov

29 April 2018	Regar-TadAZ	1–3	Khatlon	Tursunzoda
(UTC+5)	Dorobjon Ergashev 46'	Report	Navruz Rustamov 17'; Daler Shomurodov 80' (pen.); Karomatullo Saidov 89'	Stadium: TALCO Arena; Attendance: 1,100; Referee: Sayojon Zainiddinov

9 May 2018	Istiklol	3–3	CSKA Pamir Dushanbe	Hisor
18:00 (UTC+5)	Vasiev 64', 90+3'; C.Tursunov 83'	Report	Shodibek Gafforov 24'; Muhsinjon Abdugafforov 77'; Abdukhalil Boronov 86'	Stadium: Central Stadium; Attendance: 300; Referee: Sayvali Turdiyev

=== Week 8 ===
12 May 2018	Panjshir	0–0	Khujand	Kolkhozobod
15:00 (UTC+5)		Report		Stadium: Panjshir Uktam Mamatova; Attendance: 3,000; Referee: Abdurashid Murodov

12 May 2018	Kuktosh	1–0	Barkchi	Neftyanik
(UTC+5)	Mukhiddin Odilov 11'	Report		Stadium: Rudaki Stadium; Attendance: 4,500; Referee: Khurshed Dadoboev

13 May 2018	Khatlon	2–0	Regar-TadAZ	Kulob
(UTC+5)	Karomatullo Saidov 6', 58'	Report		Stadium: Central Stadium; Attendance: 1,000; Referee: Nasrullo Kabirov

10 June 2018	CSKA Pamir Dushanbe	1–2	Istiklol	Hisor
(UTC+5)	Sharafjon Solekhov 85'	Report	Nazarov 18'; Hasan 23'	Stadium: Central Stadium; Attendance: 200; Referee: Gulmurody Sadullo

=== Week 9 ===
19 May 2018	Khujand	2–0	Kuktosh	Khujand
(UTC+5)	Ergashev 10'; Tokhirov 12'	Report		Stadium: 20 Years of Independence Stadium; Attendance: 3,000; Referee: Sayojon Zainiddinov

19 May 2018	Barkchi	1–0	Khatlon	Hisor
(UTC+5)	Vakhdat Khanonov 72'	Report		Stadium: Central Stadium; Attendance: 200; Referee: Abdurashid Murodov

20 May 2018	Regar-TadAZ	2–2	CSKA Pamir Dushanbe	Tursunzoda
(UTC+5)	Firuz Karaev 3', 64'	Report	Shamsiddin Kosimov 37'; Abdukhalil Boronov 42'	Stadium: TALCO Arena; Attendance: 3,500; Referee: Khurshed Dadoboev

21 May 2018	Istiklol	1–0	Panjshir	Hisor
(UTC+5)	Zyanko 12'	Report		Stadium: Central Stadium; Attendance: 700; Referee: Vladimir Domladzhanov

=== Week 10 ===
24 May 2018	Khujand	4–3	Istiklol	Khujand
17:00 (UTC+5)	Rustamov 26'; Tokhirov 28'; Hikmatullo Rasulov 65'; Dilshod Bozorov 90'	Report	Zyanko 21'; Babadjanov 24'; Jalilov 35'	Stadium: 20 Years of Independence Stadium; Attendance: 8,500; Referee: Svetlan Turdiyev

26 May 2018	Kuktosh	4–2	Khatlon	Neftyanik
(UTC+5)	Nodirbek Ibragimov 38' (pen.); Azizbek Sultonov 45'; Muhammadsharifi Saidhuja 68'; Idan Okran 71'	Report	Khudoydod Uzokov 78'; Parviz Ahunov 80'	Stadium: Rudaki Stadium; Attendance: 4,000; Referee: Gulmurody Sadullo

26 May 2018	CSKA Pamir Dushanbe	1–0	Barkchi	Hisor
(UTC+5)	Sharafjon Solekhov 50'	Report		Stadium: Central Stadium; Attendance: 100; Referee: Sayojon Zainiddinov

27 May 2018	Panjshir	0–2	Regar-TadAZ	Kolkhozobod
(UTC+5)		Report	Firuz Karaev 7'; Khayrullo Azizov 78'	Stadium: Panjshir Uktam Mamatova; Attendance: 3,500; Referee: Behrouz Murtazoev

=== Week 11 ===
3 June 2018	Kuktosh	0–2	Istiklol	Neftyanik
(UTC+5)		Report	Hasan 35'; Vasiev 38'	Stadium: Rudaki Stadium; Attendance: 6,000; Referee: Nasrullo Kabirov

3 June 2018	Regar-TadAZ	1–1	Khujand	Tursunzoda
(UTC+5)	Amirjon Safarov 11'	Report	Dilshod Bozorov 84'	Stadium: TALCO Arena; Attendance: 2,000; Referee: Gulmurody Sadullo

5 June 2018	Khatlon	0–1	CSKA Pamir Dushanbe	Kulob
(UTC+5)		Report	Muhammad Alipur 32'	Stadium: Central Stadium; Attendance: 400; Referee: Khurshed Dadoboev

6 June 2018	Barkchi	1–2	Panjshir	Hisor
(UTC+5)	Vahdat Khanonov 57' (pen.)	Report	Hayriddin Turakhonov 70'; Khasan Holov 73'	Stadium: Central Stadium; Attendance: 200; Referee: Sayvali Turdiyev

=== Week 12 ===
28 July 2018	Kuktosh	2–1	CSKA Pamir Dushanbe	Neftyanik
(UTC+5)	Mehrojiddin Muzaffarov 2'; Mukhiddin Odilov 48'	Report	Dorogjon Ergashev 31'	Stadium: Rudaki Stadium; Attendance: 3,000; Referee: Nasrullo Kabirov

28 July 2018	Panjshir	1–1	Khatlon	Kolkhozobod
(UTC+5)	Alisheri Hotam 90'	Report	Naimjon Ibrahimzoda 48'	Stadium: Panjshir Uktam Mamatova; Attendance: 3,200; Referee: Abdurashid Murodov

29 July 2018	Khujand	3–1	Barkchi	Khujand
(UTC+5)	Khurshed Beknazarov 25'; Ergashev 50' (pen.); Vusal Magerramov 90+2'	Report	Daler Yodgorov 75'	Stadium: 20 Years of Independence Stadium; Attendance: 6,500; Referee: Sayojon Zainiddinov

29 July 2018	Regar-TadAZ	1–2	Istiklol	Tursunzoda
(UTC+5)	Asrorov 83' (o.g.)	Report	Vasiev 77'; Boboev 87'	Stadium: TALCO Arena; Attendance: 3,000; Referee: Gulmurody Sadullo

=== Week 13 ===
4 August 2018	Regar-TadAZ	1–0	Kuktosh	Tursunzoda
(UTC+5)	Bakhtiyor Kalandarov 82'	Report		Stadium: TALCO Arena; Attendance: 3,000; Referee: Behrouz Murtazoev

4 August 2018	CSKA Pamir Dushanbe	0–0	Panjshir	Neftyanik
(UTC+5)		Report		Stadium: Rudaki Stadium; Attendance: 1,000; Referee: Khurshed Dadoboev

5 August 2018	Barkchi	0–1	Istiklol	Hisor
(UTC+5)		Report	Vasiev 31' (pen.)	Stadium: Central Stadium; Attendance: 250; Referee: Sayvali Turdiyev

5 August 2018	Khatlon	1–2	Khujand	Bokhtar
(UTC+5)	Karomatullo Saidov 13'	Report	Obidzhon Khakimov 56'; Ahmadov 90+5'	Stadium: Pakhtakor Stadium; Attendance: 1,500; Referee: Khusrawi Siddiqzod

=== Week 14 ===
18 August 2018	Kuktosh	3–2	Panjshir	Neftyanik
(UTC+5)	Abdurasul Rakhmonov 24', 69'; Mukhiddin Odilov 35'	Report	Mahmud Gayurov 47'; Numon Zokirov 87'	Stadium: Rudaki Stadium; Attendance: 1,200; Referee: Khusrawi Siddiqzod

18 August 2018	Regar-TadAZ	2–1	Barkchi	Tursunzoda
(UTC+5)	Vaysiddin Safarov 56'; Navruz Rustamov 67'	Report	Sharafjon Solekhov 84'	Stadium: TALCO Arena; Attendance: 3,000; Referee: Sayvali Turdiyev

19 August 2018	Khujand	4–0	CSKA Pamir Dushanbe	Khujand
(UTC+5)	Ahmadov 60'; Ergashev 63' (pen.); Idibek Khabibulloev 84'; Tokhirov 90+4'	Report		Stadium: 20 Years of Independence Stadium; Attendance: 5,000; Referee: Gulmurody Sadullo

19 August 2018	Khatlon	0–1	Istiklol	Bokhtar
(UTC+5)		Report	Fatkhuloev 53'	Stadium: Pakhtakor Stadium; Attendance: 2,000; Referee: Sayojon Zainiddinov

=== Week 15 ===
25 August 2018	Kuktosh	4–2	CSKA Pamir Dushanbe	Neftyanik
(UTC+5)	Idan Okran 8'; Sirojiddin Gulmurodov 42'; Nodirbek Ibragimov 78'; Mukhiddin Odilov 84'	Report	Muhsinjon Abdugafforov 27'; Shodibek Gafforov 56'	Stadium: Rudaki Stadium; Attendance: 5,000; Referee: Khurshed Dadoboev

26 August 2018	Khatlon	1–1	Istiklol	Bokhtar
(UTC+5)	Karomatullo Saidov 58'	Report	Vasiev (penalty missed) 45'; Nazarov 79' (pen.)	Stadium: Pakhtakor Stadium; Attendance: 2,000; Referee: Behrouz Murtazoev

26 August 2018	Panjshir	1–2	Khujand	Kolkhozobod
(UTC+5)	Munir Davlatbekov 75'	Report	Choriyev 8'; Tokhirov 16'	Stadium: Panjshir Uktam Mamatova; Attendance: 3,000; Referee: Nasim Khamidov

26 August 2018	Barkchi	3–2	Regar-TadAZ	Hisor
(UTC+5)	Sharafjon Solekhov 5'; Nuriddin Khamrokulov 22'; Zievuddin Fuzailov 45+1'	Report	Abdugafforov 45+4' (pen.); Amirjon Safarov 58'	Stadium: Central Stadium; Attendance: 400; Referee: Khusrawi Siddiqzod

=== Week 16 ===
13 September 2018	Regar-TadAZ	0–2	Istiklol	Tursunzoda
(UTC+5)		Report	Boboev 42', 49'	Stadium: TALCO Arena; Attendance: 2,000; Referee: Sayojon Zainiddinov

13 September 2018	Khujand	3–0	Barkchi	Khujand
(UTC+5)	Dilshod Bozorov 6'; Ergashev 45+1'; Dilshod Karimov 86'	Report		Stadium: 20 Years of Independence Stadium; Attendance: 4,000; Referee: Gulmurodi Sadullo

14 September 2018	CSKA Pamir Dushanbe	1–1	Panjshir	Rudaki
(UTC+5)	Shodibek Gafforov 36'	Report	Munir Davlatbekov 73'	Stadium: Oilfield stadium Attendance: 300; Referee: Abdurashid Murodov

14 September 2018	Khatlon	1–0	Kuktosh	Bokhtar
(UTC+5)	Umarjon Sharipov 69'	Report		Stadium: Pakhtakor Stadium; Attendance: 1,500; Referee: Nasrullo Kabirov

=== Week 17 ===
18 September 2018	Kuktosh	2–3	Istiklol	Neftyanik
(UTC+5)	Mehrojiddin Muzaffarov 15'; Ocran Idan 58' (pen.)	Report	Fatkhuloev 45', 81' (pen.) (yellow card); Juraboev 60'	Stadium: Rudaki Stadium; Attendance: 5,000; Referee: Gulmurody Sadullo

19 September 2018	Panjshir	2–0	Khatlon	Kolkhozobod
(UTC+5)	Munir Davlatbekov 22'; Hyriddin Turakhonov 77'	Report		Stadium: Panjshir Uktam Mamatova; Attendance: 3,000; Referee: Sayojon Zainiddinov

19 September 2018	Regar-TadAZ	0–1	Khujand	Tursunzoda
(UTC+5)		Report	Tokhirov 57'	Stadium: TALCO Arena; Attendance: 1,500; Referee: Nasim Khamidov

20 September 2018	Barkchi	2–1	CSKA Pamir Dushanbe	Hisor
(UTC+5)	Daler Yodgorov 52'; Tokhir Malodoustov 62'	Report	Muhsin Abdugafforov 44'	Stadium: Central Stadium; Attendance: 100; Referee: Nasrullo Kabirov

=== Week 18 ===
23 September 2018	Istiklol	1–0	Khujand	Dushanbe
(UTC+5)	Boboev 66'	Report		Stadium: Pamir Stadium; Attendance: 7,000; Referee: Sayojon Zainiddinov

23 September 2018	CSKA Pamir Dushanbe	0–2	Regar-TadAZ	Dushanbe
(UTC+5)			Bakhtior Kalandarov 44'; Amirdzhon Safarov 74'	Stadium: Aviator Stadium; Attendance: 100; Referee: Gulmurodi Sadullo

23 September 2018	Khatlon	1–2	Barkchi	Bokhtar
(UTC+5)	Parviz Akhunov 29'	Report	Nuriddin Khamrokulov 49'; Daler Yodgorov 74'	Stadium: Pakhtakor Stadium; Attendance: 3,500; Referee: Hurshed Dadadoev

23 September 2018	Kuktosh	2–0	Panjshir	Rudaki
(UTC+5)	Mehrojiddin Muzaffarov 30', 90+1'	Report		Stadium: Oilfield stadium Attendance: 6,000; Referee: Behruz Murtazoev

=== Week 19 ===
26 September 2018	Barkchi	1–3	Kuktosh	Hisor
(UTC+5)	Mehrojiddin Muzaffarov 43'	Report	Muhiddin Odilov 5'; Hussein Nurmatov 12' (o.g.); Abdulmumin Zabirov 23'	Stadium: Central Stadium; Attendance: 1,000; Referee: Khusravi Siddikzod

3 November 2018	Panjshir	0–2	Istiklol	Kolkhozobod
14:00 (UTC+5)		Report	Boboev 7', 9'	Stadium: Panjshir Uktam Mamatova; Attendance: 2,000; Referee: Behruz Murtazoev
Note: Match originally scheduled for 26 September 2018

3 November 2018	Regar-TadAZ	0–2	Khatlon	Tursunzoda
(UTC+5)		Report	Mahmadali Sadykov 24', 33'	Stadium: TALCO Arena; Attendance: 700; Referee: Hurshed Dadadoev
Note: Match originally scheduled for 29 September 2018

3 November 2018	Khujand	0–0	CSKA Pamir Dushanbe	Khujand
(UTC+5)		Report		Stadium: 20 Years of Independence Stadium; Attendance: 1,000; Referee: Gulmurodi Sadullo
Note: Match originally scheduled for 30 September 2018

=== Week 20 ===
7 November 2018	Panjshir	2–1	Barkchi	Kolkhozobod
(UTC+5)	Shavkat Khudoynazarov 31'; Munir Davlatbekov 62'	Report	Nurmatov 90+4'	Stadium: Panjshir Uktam Mamatova; Attendance: 3,500; Referee: Gulmurodi Sadullo

7 November 2018	Istiklol	0–1	CSKA Pamir Dushanbe	Dushanbe
14:00 (UTC+5)	Abdumominov (yellow card); Fatkhuloev (yellow card)	Report	S.Gafforov 54'; Z.Kholikov (yellow card)	Stadium: Pamir Stadium; Attendance: 500; Referee: Khusravi Siddikzod

7 November 2018	Khatlon	4–2	Khujand	Qurghonteppa
(UTC+5)	Umarjon Sharipov 24', 37', 50'; Saidov 49'	Report	Dilshojon Karimov 82'; Choriyev 88'	Stadium: Pakhtakor Stadium; Attendance: 500; Referee: Nasrullo Kabirov

7 November 2018	Kuktosh	1–2	Regar-TadAZ	Rudaki
(UTC+5)	Mehrojiddin Muzaffarov 12' (pen.); Navruz Rustamov 74'	Report	Hikmatullo Rasulov 45'	Stadium: Oilfield stadium Attendance: 2,000; Referee: Sayojon Zainiddinov

=== Week 21 ===
11 November 2018	Barkchi	0–2	Istiklol	Dushanbe
14:00 (UTC+5)	M.Safarov (yellow card); D.Yodgorov (yellow card)	Report	Boboev 83', 88'; Rakhimov (yellow card), K.Zainiddin (yellow card)	Stadium: Pamir Stadium; Attendance: 100; Referee: Syedjon Zayniddinov

11 November 2018	Regar-TadAZ	2–0	Panjshir	Tursunzoda
(UTC+5)	Navruz Rustamov 44', 84'	Report		Stadium: TALCO Arena; Attendance: 500; Referee: Nasrullo Kabirov

11 November 2018	Khujand	3–1	Kuktosh	Khujand
(UTC+5)	Tokhirov 5', 19', 77'	Report	Azizbek Sultonov 7'	Stadium: 20 Years of Independence Stadium; Referee: Behruz Murtazoev

11 November 2018	CSKA Pamir Dushanbe	3–3	Khatlon	Dushanbe
(UTC+5)	Idibek Khabibulloev 28'; Muhsingjon Abdugafforov 34' (pen.); Shamsiddin Kosimov 79' (pen.)	Report	Alisher Barotov 26'; Hudoydod Uzokov 77'; Daler Shomurodov 86' (pen.)	Stadium: Aviator Stadium; Attendance: 200; Referee: Gulmurodi Sadullo

== Season statistics ==
=== Scoring ===
- First goal of the season: Sheriddin Boboev for Istiklol against Khatlon (10 March 2017)

=== Top scorers ===
As of match played 11 November 2018

Rank	Player	Club	Goals
1	(Tajikistan) Sheriddin Boboev	Istiklol	12
2	(Tajikistan) Jahongir Ergashev	Khujand	9
2	(Tajikistan) Farkhod Tokhirov	Khujand	9
2	(Tajikistan) Navruz Rustamov	Khatlon/Regar-TadAZ	9
5	(Tajikistan) Dilshod Vasiev	Istiklol	6
5	(Tajikistan) Karomatullo Saidov	Khatlon	6

=== Hat-tricks ===
Player	For	Against	Result	Date	Ref
(Tajikistan) Umarjon Sharipov	Khatlon	Khujand	4-2	7 November 2018	
(Tajikistan) Farkhod Tokhirov	Khujand	Kuktosh	3-1	11 November 2018	
