= Yakkakhona =

Yakkakhona Яккахона
- Location in Tajikistan
- Coordinates: 39°18′54″N 68°7′10″E
- Country: Tajikistan
- Region: Sughd Region
- City: Panjakent
- Official languages: Russian (Interethnic); Tajik (State)

Yakkakhona (Russian and Tajik: Яккахона) is a village in Sughd Region, northern Tajikistan. It is part of the jamoat Rudaki in the city of Panjakent.
