= Otabek Karimov =

Tajikistani footballer

Personal information
- Date of birth: 4 January 1998 (age 28)
- Place of birth: Tajikistan
- Position: Midfielder

Team information
- Current team: Kuktosh Rudaki

Senior career*
Years	Team	Apps	(Gls)
2018	Khatlon		
2019	Istaravshan		
2019–	Kuktosh Rudaki		

International career^{‡}
2019–	Tajikistan	4	(0)
- * Club domestic league appearances and goals as of 21:06, 31 March 2020 (UTC) ‡ National team caps and goals as of 09:10, 16 July 2019 (UTC)

Otabek Karimov (born 4 January 1998) is a Tajikistani professional football player who currently plays for Kuktosh Rudaki.

== Career ==
=== International ===
Saidov made his senior team debut on 11 June 2019 against China in their 1–0 friendly defeat.

== Career statistics ==
=== International ===
Tajikistan national team
Year	Apps	Goals
2019	4	0
Total	4	0

Statistics accurate as of match played 15 July 2019
