= Artuch =

- Location in Tajikistan
- Coordinates: 39°20′00″N 68°6′30″E
- Country: Tajikistan
- Region: Sughd Region
- City: Panjakent
- Official languages: Russian (Interethnic); Tajik (State)

Artuch (Russian and Tajik: Артуч) is a village in Sughd Region, northern Tajikistan. It is part of the jamoat Rudaki in the city of Panjakent. It is not far from the Kulikalon Lakes. W-01.jpg
