= Mikalay Zyanko =

Belarusian footballer

Personal information
- Full name: Mikalay Zyanko
- Date of birth: 11 March 1989 (age 37)
- Place of birth: Orsha, Vitebsk Oblast, Belarusian SSR
- Height: 1.88 m (6 ft 2 in)
- Position: Forward

Team information
- Current team: Traktor Minsk

Youth career
- 2006–2007: Minsk

Senior career*
Years	Team	Apps	(Gls)
2006	Smena Minsk	23	(0)
2007–2008	Minsk	17	(0)
2009	Vedrich-97 Rechitsa	13	(7)
2009	Belshina Bobruisk	9	(1)
2010–2012	Minsk	27	(1)
2012	→ Dnepr Mogilev (loan)	26	(11)
2013	Dnepr Mogilev	12	(1)
2014–2015	Slutsk	49	(5)
2016	Granit Mikashevichi	11	(0)
2016–2017	Milsami Orhei	20	(4)
2017	Slavia Mozyr	5	(0)
2018	Istiklol	8	(2)
2018	Gorodeya	5	(0)
2019	Lida	27	(10)
2020	Krumkachy Minsk	9	(1)
2020	Smorgon	14	(6)
2021	Orsha	31	(10)
2022	Lida	7	(0)
2022	Orsha	12	(2)
2023–	Traktor Minsk	7	(3)

International career
2011	Belarus U21	1	(0)
2011	Belarus Olympic	1	(0)
- * Club domestic league appearances and goals as of 31 December 2023

Mikalay Zyanko (Belarusian: Мікалай Зянько; Russian: Николай Зенько; born 11 March 1989) is a Belarusian professional football player who plays for Traktor Minsk.

== Career ==
=== Club ===
In February 2014 Zyanko signed for FC Slutsk, extending his contract the following January, before leaving the club by mutual agreement in January 2016.

In February 2016 Zyanko signed for FC Granit Mikashevichi, but left the club in July 2016 due to the club's financial problems, going on to sign for Moldovan club FC Milsami Orhei.

In August 2017 Zyanko returned to Belarus, signing for FC Slavia Mozyr, leaving the club at the end of the season following their relegation.

== Career statistics ==
=== Club ===
As of match played 24 May 2018

Club	Season	League			National Cup		Continental		Other		Total	
Club	Season	Division	Apps	Goals	Apps	Goals	Apps	Goals	Apps	Goals	Apps	Goals
Slutsk	2014	Belarusian Premier League	31	5	2	0	-		-		33	5
Slutsk	2015	Belarusian Premier League	18	0	3	1	-		-		21	1
Slutsk	Total		49	5	5	1	-	-	-	-	54	6
Granit Mikashevichi	2016	Belarusian Premier League	11	0	1	0	-		-		12	0
Milsami Orhei	2016–17	Divizia Națională	20	4	1	0	-		-		21	4
Slavia Mozyr	2017	Belarusian Premier League	5	0	0	0	-		-		5	0
Istiklol	2018	Tajik League	8	2	0	0	6	2	1	1	15	5
Career total			93	11	7	1	6	2	1	1	107	14

== Honors ==
Istiklol

- Tajikistan Football League champion: 2018
- Tajik Supercup winner: 2018
