= Kuloli =

- Location in Tajikistan
- Coordinates: 39°22′00″N 68°2′30″E
- Country: Tajikistan
- Region: Sughd Region
- City: Panjakent

Kuloli (Tajik: Кулолӣ, formerly Husanobod) is a village in Sughd Region, northern Tajikistan. It is part of the jamoat Rudaki in the city of Panjakent.
