= Alisher Barotov =

Tajikistani professional football player

Personal information
- Date of birth: 10 September 1999 (age 27)
- Place of birth: Tajikistan
- Height: 1.84 m (6 ft 0 in)
- Position: Defender

Team information
- Current team: Vakhsh Bokhtar
- Number: 73

Senior career*
Years	Team	Apps	(Gls)
2019	Khatlon		
2019–2023	Khujand	52	(2)
2023	Khatlon	16	(1)
2024	Khujand	15	(0)
2025–	Vakhsh Bokhtar	13	(0)

International career^{‡}
2019–	Tajikistan	2	(0)
- * Club domestic league appearances and goals as of 16 March 2026 ‡ National team caps and goals as of 10:46, 19 August 2019 (UTC)

Alisher Barotov (born 10 September 1999) is a Tajikistani professional football player who currently plays for Vakhsh Bokhtar.

== Career ==
=== International ===
Barotov made his senior team debut on 10 July 2019 against Syria.

== Career statistics ==
=== International ===
Tajikistan national team
Year	Apps	Goals
2019	2	0
Total	2	0

Statistics accurate as of match played 15 July 2019
