= Kyrylo Silich =

Ukrainian footballer

Personal information
- Full name: Kyrylo Yevhenovych Silich
- Date of birth: 3 August 1990 (age 36)
- Place of birth: Odesa, Ukrainian SSR
- Height: 1.82 m (5 ft 11 1/2 in)
- Position: Midfielder

Youth career
- –2003: Chornomorets Odesa
- 2003–2004: Ukrposhta Odesa
- 2004–2006: Avangard Promrynok 7 Odesa

Senior career*
Years	Team	Apps	(Gls)
2006–2008	Dnister Ovidiopol	38	(1)
2008–2009	Knyazha-2 Shchaslyve	12	(0)
2009	Nyva Vinnytsia	10	(2)
2009–2011	Obolon Kyiv	0	(0)
2011	Desna Chernihiv	0	(0)
2012–2013	Odesa	20	(2)
2014–2015	Sillamäe Kalev	39	(9)
2016	Jelgava	12	(1)
2017	Dainava	12	(2)
2017	Jonava	4	(0)
2018	07 Vestur	25	(2)
2019	Dainava	0	(0)
2019	United Victory		
2020	Chornomorets Odesa	0	(0)
2021	Šilas	10	(0)
2022–2023	Dainava	0	(0)
- * Club domestic league appearances and goals

Kyrylo Silich (Ukrainian: Кирило Євгенович Сіліч; born on 3 August 1990) is a Ukrainian former professional footballer who played as a midfielder.

== History ==
Midfielder joined Lithuanian I Lyga side DFK Dainava on 9 March 2017. He played a total of 850 minutes in all 12 matches of the first 13 tours, assisting team forwards Sam Shaban and Lukas Baranauskas and helping the club to reach 1st place in the league table.

Silich moved to A Lyga club Jonava in the 2017 summer transfer window.

In 2019, Silich returned to DFK Dainava.
