= Rudaki, Tajikistan =

Rudaki Рӯдакӣ رودکی
- Jamoat
- Location in Tajikistan
- Coordinates: 39°21′N 68°03′E
- Country: Tajikistan
- Region: Sughd Region
- City: Panjakent

Population (2015)
  - Total: 18,465
- Time zone: UTC+5 (TJT)
- Official languages: Russian (Interethnic); Tajik (State) (Note: Constitution of Tajikistan)

Rudaki (Russian: Рудаки; Tajik: Рӯдакӣ/رودکی) is a jamoat in western Tajikistan. It is part of the city of Panjakent in the Sughd Region. The jamoat has a total population of 15,039 (2015). It consists of 13 villages, including Kuloli (the seat), Artuch, Neknot and Yakkakhona.

It is the birthplace of the poet Rudaki.
