= Hussein Nurmatov =

Tajik footballer (born 2000)

Personal information
- Date of birth: 18 September 2000 (age 26)
- Place of birth: Qurghonteppa, Tajikistan
- Position: Defender

Team information
- Current team: Khatlon
- Number: 20

Senior career*
Years	Team	Apps	(Gls)
2017–2018	Barkchi		
2020	Khatlon		
2021–2022	Istaravshan		
2023	Khosilot Farkhor	0	(0)
2023–	Eskhata Khujand		

International career^{‡}
2018–	Tajikistan	2	(0)
- * Club domestic league appearances and goals as of 20:58, 31 March 2020 (UTC) ‡ National team caps and goals as of 08:22, 19 December 2018 (UTC)

Hussein Nurmatov (born 18 September 2000) is a Tajik professional football player who plays as a defender for Eskhata Khujand.

== Career ==
=== International ===
Nurmatov made his senior team debut on 13 December 2018 against Oman.

== Career statistics ==
=== International ===
Tajikistan national team
Year	Apps	Goals
2018	2	0
Total	2	0

Statistics accurate as of match played 16 December 2018
