= Kuktosh Rudaki =

Tajik football club

FC Kuktosh
- Full name: Football Club Kuktosh
- Founded: 2011; 14 years ago
- Ground: Neftyanik stadium
- Capacity: 6,000
- Manager: Khikmatullo Sharipov
- League: Tajikistan Higher League
- 2024: Tajikistan Higher League, 12
| Home colours | Away colours |

Kuktosh Rudaki is a Tajik professional football club based in Rudaki District.

== History ==
They won the 2017 Tajikistan First League and were promoted to the top division Tajikistan Football League for 2018.

In 2018 was debut season in first level and they finished in 3rd position.

On 20 February 2019, Rahmatullo Fuzailov was announced as the club's manager, replacing Alijon Turdinazarov who managed the club during the 2018 season.

=== Domestic history ===
| Season | League | | | | | | | | | Tajik Cup | Top goalscorer | | Manager |
| Season | Div. | Pos. | Pl. | W | D | L | GS | GA | P | Tajik Cup | Name | League | Manager |
|---|---|---|---|---|---|---|---|---|---|---|---|---|---|
| 2018 | 1st | 3rd | 21 | 9 | 3 | 9 | 31 | 32 | 30 | Last 16 | | | Alijon Turdinazarov |
| 2019 | 1st | 6th | 21 | 7 | 6 | 8 | 31 | 36 | 27 | Last 16 | Muhiddin Odilov | 6 | Rahmatullo Fuzailov |
| 2020 | 1st | 4th | 18 | 7 | 7 | 4 | 30 | 24 | 28 | Quarterfinal | Muhsinjon Abdugafforov; Mbeke Siebatcheu | 5 | Makhmadjon Khabibulloev |
| 2021 | 1st | 9th | 27 | 7 | 5 | 15 | 38 | 58 | 26 | Quarterfinal | Amirjon Safarov | 9 | Makhmadjon Khabibulloev; Hikmatullo Sharpiov |
| 2022 | 2nd | | | | | | | | | | | | |
| 2023 | 1st | 3rd | 22 | 10 | 3 | 9 | 38 | 36 | 33 | | Azizbek Sultonov | 10 | Abdujabbor Marufaliev |
| 2024 | 1st | 10th | 22 | 1 | 2 | 19 | 8 | 63 | 5 | Last 16 | | | Alisher Ahmadzoda |

== Current squad ==
As of 31 March 2023

Note: Flags indicate national team as defined under FIFA eligibility rules; some limited exceptions apply. Players may hold more than one non-FIFA nationality.

| No. | Pos. | Nation | Player |
|---|---|---|---|
| — | GK | (Ghana) GHA | Abraham Odonkor |
| — | GK | (Tajikistan) TJK | Azimjon Karaev |
| — | DF | (Tajikistan) TJK | Navruz Boboev |
| — | DF | (Tajikistan) TJK | Sorbon Giyosov |
| — | DF | (Tajikistan) TJK | Khomid Ibrohimov |
| — | DF | (Tajikistan) TJK | Akhtam Kholboev |
| — | DF | (Tajikistan) TJK | Sobirjon Kholmatov |
| — | DF | (Tajikistan) TJK | Azamjon Murodov |
| — | DF | (Tajikistan) TJK | Muhammadjon Rakhmonov |
| — | DF | (Tajikistan) TJK | Sulaimon Sobirov |
| — | MF | (Uzbekistan) UZB | Temur Masharipov |

| No. | Pos. | Nation | Player |
|---|---|---|---|
| — | MF | (Ghana) GHA | Mohammed Kamal |
| — | MF | (Ghana) GHA | Anani Julius Kvasi |
| — | MF | (Tajikistan) TJK | Shokhrukhi Abdukhakim |
| — | MF | (Tajikistan) TJK | Farrukh Karimov |
| — | MF | (Tajikistan) TJK | Sharifjoni Mansur |
| — | MF | (Tajikistan) TJK | Alisher Shukurov |
| — | MF | (Uzbekistan) UZB | Mukhiddin Odilov |
| — | FW | (Nigeria) NGA | Sundaya Longji Song |
| — | FW | (Tajikistan) TJK | Azizbek Sultonov |
| — | FW | (Tajikistan) TJK | Muhammad Gulaev |
| — | FW | (Tajikistan) TJK | Manuchehri Jamshed |
