= 20 Years of Independence Stadium =

Stadium in Khujand, Tajikistan

Coordinates: 40°17′32″N 69°36′51″E

20 Years of Independence Stadium Варзишгоҳи ба номи «20-солагии Истиқлолияти»
- Interactive map of 20 Years of Independence Stadium; Варзишгоҳи ба номи «20-солагии Истиқлолияти»
- Full name: 20 Years of Independence of the Republic of Tajikistan Stadium; Варзишгоҳи ба номи «20-солагии Истиқлолияти Ҷумҳурии Тоҷикистон»
- Location: Khujand, Tajikistan
- Capacity: 25,000
- Surface: Grass

Construction
- Opened: 2009

Tenant
- FC Khujand Tajikistan

Bistsolagii Istiqloliyati Stadium (Tajik: Варзишгоҳи ба номи «Бистсолагии Истиқлолияти»), also known as 20 Years of Independence Stadium, is a stadium located in Khujand, Tajikistan. It has a capacity of 25,000 spectators. It is the home of FC Khujand of the Ligai Olii Tojikiston.
