= Balkh, Tajikistan =

Balkh Балх
- Location in Tajikistan
- Coordinates: 37°35′22″N 68°39′39″E
- Country: Tajikistan
- Region: Khatlon Region
- District: Jaloliddin Balkhi
- Elevation: 1,280 m (4,200 ft)

Population (2020)
  - Total: 19,000
- Time zone: UTC+5
- Official languages: Russian (Interethnic); Tajik (State)

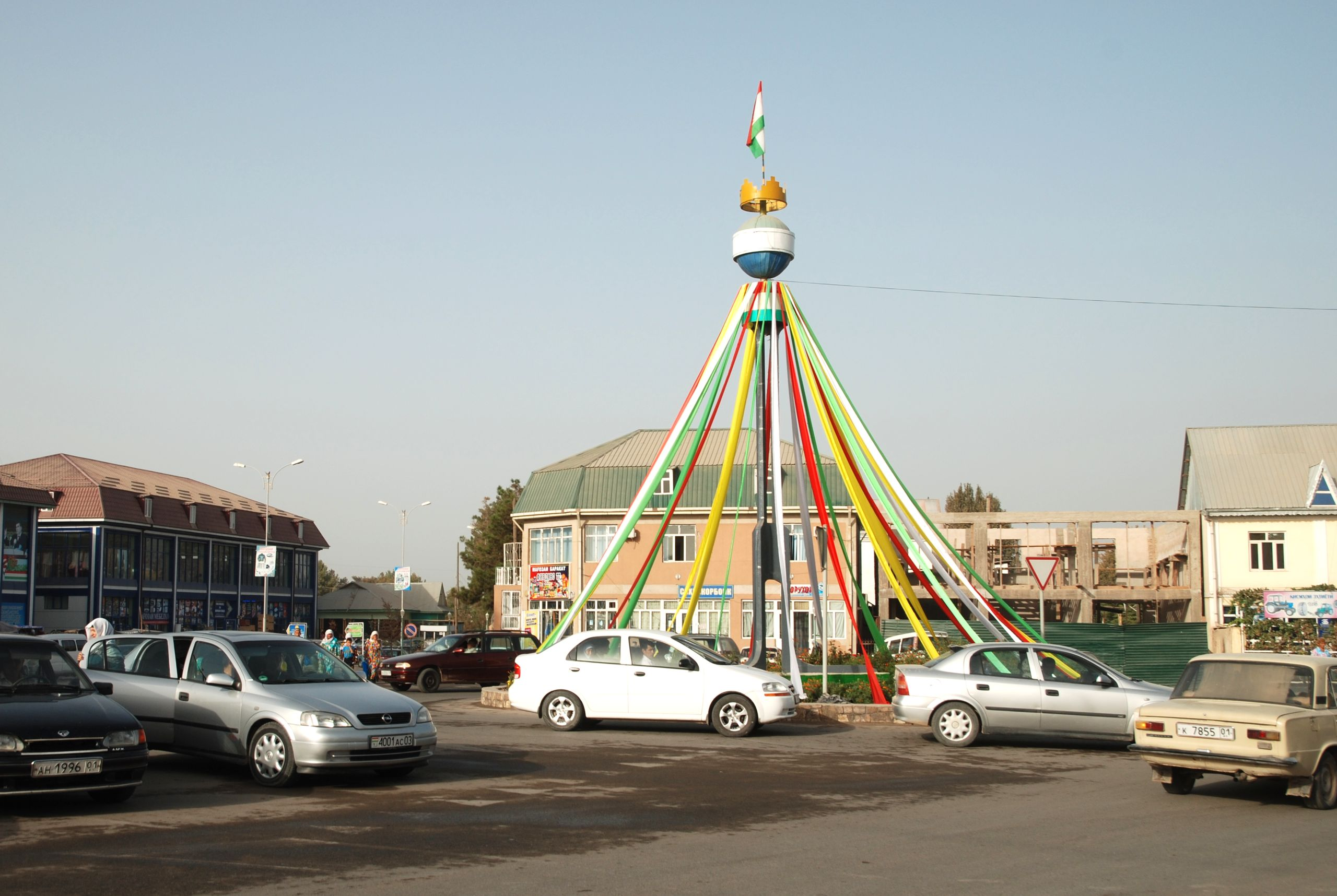
Balkh, center

Balkh (Tajik: Балх), before 2017: Kolkhozobod or Kolkhozabad (Russian transliteration), is a town in Tajikistan and not to be confused with the ancient city of Balkh (Bactra) located in modern-day northern Afghanistan, after which the town was named in 2017. It is the administrative capital of Jaloliddin Balkhi District (Kolkhozobod district until June 2007) in the south-west of Khatlon Region.

The population of Balkh in 2020 is estimated at 19,000.

== Historical names ==
The settlement was called Tugalang between 1882–1934 and Kaganovichabad between 1934 and 1957. The name Kolkhozabad (Russian version) or Kolkhozobod (Tajik version) was in use until 1991, when the town was renamed imeni Isoeva, literally "a settlement named after Sirodjiddin Isoev", who had headed the district for more than 28 years during the Soviet era and had been awarded a Hero of Socialist Labor. The name Kolkhozobod has been subsequently restored and the district capital was listed again as Kolkhozobod (or Kolkhozabad) in official publications. In February 2017, it was officially renamed Balkh.

A location with the same name (Kolkhozabad) exists also in Gorno-Badakhshan Autonomous Province, in the eastern part of Tajikistan. It lies north-east of Khorugh on the Pamir Highway 37°36′N 71°46′E.

== Geography ==
=== Climate ===
Balkh has a cold semi-arid climate (Köppen climate classification BSk). The average annual temperature is 16.8 °C (62.2 °F). The warmest month is July with an average temperature of 29.2 °C (84.6 °F) and the coolest month is January with an average temperature of 3.1 °C (37.6 °F). The average annual precipitation is 279.4 mm (11") and has an average of 70 days with precipitation. The wettest month is March with an average of 67.1 mm (2.6") of precipitation and the driest month is August with an average of 0.1 mm of precipitation.

Climate data for Kolkhozobod
Month	Jan	Feb	Mar	Apr	May	Jun	Jul	Aug	Sep	Oct	Nov	Dec	Year
Daily mean °C (°F)	3.1 (37.6)	5.9 (42.6)	11.6 (52.9)	18.0 (64.4)	23.0 (73.4)	27.8 (82.0)	29.2 (84.6)	27.0 (80.6)	22.3 (72.1)	16.8 (62.2)	10.7 (51.3)	5.8 (42.4)	16.8 (62.2)
Average precipitation mm (inches)	37.9 (1.49)	42.6 (1.68)	67.1 (2.64)	45.5 (1.79)	24.8 (0.98)	1.2 (0.05)	0.5 (0.02)	0.1 (0.00)	0.3 (0.01)	8 (0.3)	20.1 (0.79)	31.3 (1.23)	279.4 (11.00)
Average precipitation days (≥ 0.1 mm)	9.8	10.2	12.3	9.9	7.1	1.4	0.6	0.1	0.3	3.4	5.7	9.2	70
Average relative humidity (%)	74.0	70.7	67.8	63.4	51.8	35.9	33.8	35.0	37.9	48.3	60.8	71.3	54.2
Source: "The Climate of Kolkhozobod". Weatherbase.
