= FC Istiklol in Asian football =

Overview of the FC Istiklol's role in Asian football

Istiklol in Asian football
- Club: Istiklol
- Most appearances: Akhtam Nazarov (54)
- Top scorer: Manuchekhr Dzhalilov (15)
- First entry: 2011 AFC President's Cup
- Latest entry: 2025–26 AFC Champions League Two

Titles
- President's Cup: 2012

Istiklol is a Tajik football club based in Dushanbe, a city located in Tajikistan.

== History ==
=== Matches ===
As of match played 23 October 2026

Season	Competition	Round	Club	Home	Away	Aggregate
2011	AFC President's Cup	Group B	(Palestine) Jabal Al Mukaber	2–0		1st
2011	AFC President's Cup	Group B	(Bhutan) Yeedzin	8–0		1st
2011	AFC President's Cup	Group B	(Myanmar) Yadanarbon	1–1		1st
2011	AFC President's Cup	Final Stage; Group A	(Chinese Taipei) Taipower FC	0–2		3rd
2011	AFC President's Cup	Final Stage; Group A	(Turkmenistan) Balkan	1–1		3rd
2012	AFC President's Cup	Group C	(Palestine) Markaz Shabab Al-Am'ari	1–0		1st
2012	AFC President's Cup	Group C	(Turkmenistan) Balkan	2–1		1st
2012	AFC President's Cup	Final Stage; Group A	(Kyrgyzstan) Dordoi Bishkek	2–0		1st
2012	AFC President's Cup	Final Stage; Group A	(Cambodia) Phnom Penh Crown	1–1		1st
2012	AFC President's Cup	Final	(Palestine) Markaz Shabab Al-Am'ari	2–1		
2015	AFC Cup	Group C	(Kuwait) Qadsia	2–0	2–2	1st
2015	AFC Cup	Group C	(Turkmenistan) Ahal	5–2	2–1	1st
2015	AFC Cup	Group C	(Iraq) Erbil	0–0	1–3	1st
2015	AFC Cup	Round of 16	(Syria) Al-Wahda	1–1 (p)		
2015	AFC Cup	Quarter-finals	(Malaysia) Pahang	4–0	1–3	5–3
2015	AFC Cup	Semi-finals	Al-Kuwait	w/o	0–4	w/o
2015	AFC Cup	Final	(Malaysia) Johor Darul Ta'zim	0–1		
2016	AFC Cup	Group B	(Iraq) Naft Al-Wasat	0–1	0–2	4th
2016	AFC Cup	Group B	(Jordan) Al-Faisaly	0–0	2–4	4th
2016	AFC Cup	Group B	(Lebanon) Tripoli	1–3	0–1	4th
2017	AFC Cup	Group D	(Turkmenistan) Altyn Asyr	1–0	1–1	1st
2017	AFC Cup	Group D	(Kyrgyzstan) Alay Osh	3–1	4–1	1st
2017	AFC Cup	Group D	(Kyrgyzstan) Dordoi Bishkek	2–0	4–1	1st
2017	AFC Cup	Inter-zone play-off semi-final	(Philippines) Ceres Negros	4–0	1–1	5–1
2017	AFC Cup	Inter-zone play-off final	(India) Bengaluru	1–0	2–2	3–2
2017	AFC Cup	Final	(Iraq) Al-Quwa Al-Jawiya	0–1		
2018	AFC Cup	Group D	(Kyrgyzstan) Alay Osh	1–0	3–2	2nd
2018	AFC Cup	Group D	(Turkmenistan) Altyn Asyr	2–3	2–2	2nd
2018	AFC Cup	Group D	(Turkmenistan) Ahal	1–0	1–0	2nd
2019	AFC Champions League	Preliminary round 2	(Uzbekistan) AGMK	2–4		
2019	AFC Cup	Group D	(Kyrgyzstan) Dordoi Bishkek	4–1	1–2	2nd
2019	AFC Cup	Group D	(Turkmenistan) Altyn Asyr	1–1	1–1	2nd
2019	AFC Cup	Group D	(Tajikistan) Khujand	3–0	2–3	2nd
2020	AFC Champions League	Preliminary round 2	(Uzbekistan) Lokomotiv Tashkent	1–0		
2020	AFC Champions League	Play-off round	(Saudi Arabia) Al-Ahli	0–1		
2020	AFC Cup	Group D	(Kyrgyzstan) Dordoi Bishkek	—N/a	—N/a	-
2020	AFC Cup	Group D	(Turkmenistan) Altyn Asyr	—N/a	—N/a	-
2020	AFC Cup	Group D	(Tajikistan) Khujand	2–0	—N/a	-
2021	AFC Champions League	Group A	(Saudi Arabia) Al Hilal	4–1	1–3	1st
2021	AFC Champions League	Group A	(United Arab Emirates) Shabab al-Ahli	0–0	1–0	1st
2021	AFC Champions League	Group A	(Uzbekistan) AGMK	1–2	3–2	1st
2021	AFC Champions League	Round of 16	(Iran) Persepolis	0–1		
2022	AFC Champions League	Group A	(Saudi Arabia) Al Hilal	0–3	0–1	4th
2022	AFC Champions League	Group A	(Qatar) Al-Rayyan	2–3	0–1	4th
2022	AFC Champions League	Group A	(United Arab Emirates) Sharjah	2–0	1–2	4th
2023–24	AFC Champions League	Group E	(Iran) Persepolis	1–1	0–2	4th
2023–24	AFC Champions League	Group E	(Qatar) Al-Duhail	0–0	0–2	4th
2023–24	AFC Champions League	Group E	(Saudi Arabia) Al Nassr	1–1	1–3	4th
2024–25	AFC Champions League 2	Group C	(Iran) Sepahan	0–2	0–4	4th
2024–25	AFC Champions League 2	Group C	(Jordan) Al-Wehdat	0–1	0–1	4th
2024–25	AFC Champions League 2	Group C	(United Arab Emirates) Sharjah	0–1	1–3	4th
2025–26	AFC Champions League 2	Group D	(Saudi Arabia) Al Nassr	0–4	0–5	3rd
2025–26	AFC Champions League 2	Group D	(Iraq) Al-Zawraa	2–1	1–2	3rd
2025–26	AFC Champions League 2	Group D	(India) Goa	2–0	2–1	3rd
2026–27	AFC Challenge League	Group B	(Kuwait) Al-Arabi	2–0		3rd
2026–27	AFC Challenge League	Group B	(Lebanon) Nejmeh	0–1		3rd
2026–27	AFC Challenge League	Group B	(Syria) Homs Al Fidaa	0–2		3rd

== Player statistics ==
=== Appearances ===
As of match played 23 October 2026

Rank	Position	Player	Years	AFC President's Cup	AFC Cup	AFC Champions League	AFC Champions League Two	AFC Challenge League	Total
1	DF	(Tajikistan) Akhtam Nazarov	2013–2019, 2020–2023, 2023–2025	(-)	38 (3)	11 (0)	6 (0)	(-)	55 (3)
2	MF	(Tajikistan) Fatkhullo Fatkhulloyev	2011–2017, 2018–2019	10 (4)	40 (7)	1 (0)	(-)	(-)	51 (11)
3	FW	(Tajikistan) Manuchekhr Dzhalilov	2015–2017, 2020–2025	(-)	29 (11)	15 (4)	6 (0)	(-)	50 (15)
4	GK	(Serbia) Nikola Stošić	2013–2020, 2024–2025	(-)	39 (0)	1 (0)	9 (0)	(-)	49 (0)
5	MF	(Tajikistan) Nuriddin Davronov	2009–2012, 2013–2016, 2017, 2017–20128, 2019, 2022	10 (1)	26 (3)	10 (0)	(-)	(-)	46 (4)
6	FW	(Tajikistan) Dilshod Vasiyev	2009–2019	10 (4)	32 (8)	(-)	(-)	(-)	42 (12)
7	MF	(Tajikistan) Ehson Panjshanbe	2016–2020, 2023–2024, 2025, 2026–Present	(-)	16 (1)	9 (0)	12 (1)	3 (0)	40 (2)
8	MF	(Tajikistan) Amirbek Juraboev	2016–2019, 2020–2022, 2024–Present	(-)	19 (0)	3 (0)	11 (3)	3 (0)	37 (3)
9	MF	(Tajikistan) Mukhammadzhon Rakhimov	2017–2021, 2022–2023, 2025–Present	(-)	16 (0)	13 (2)	5 (0)	2 (0)	36 (2)
10	MF	(Tajikistan) Alisher Dzhalilov	2019–2022, 2023–Present	(-)	7 (3)	16 (3)	8 (0)	3 (0)	34 (6)
11	DF	(Tajikistan) Siyovush Asrorov	2013–2018, 2022–2023	(-)	30 (0)	(-)	(-)	(-)	30 (0)
12	FW	(Tajikistan) Rustam Soirov	2020–2022, 2024–Present	(-)	1 (0)	13 (1)	12 (1)	3 (1)	29 (3)
13	MF	(Tajikistan) Jakhongir Jalilov	2009–2016	10 (0)	14 (2)	(-)	(-)	(-)	24 (2)
14	DF	(Ukraine) Oleksiy Larin	2019–2021, 2024	(-)	7 (0)	10 (0)	6 (0)	(-)	23 (0)
14	MF	(Tajikistan) Romish Jalilov	2012–2018, 2020–2021, 2023, 2025–Present	(-)	17 (2)	5 (0)	1 (0)	0 (0)	23 (2)
16	FW	(Tajikistan) Shervoni Mabatshoyev	2021–2024, 2026–Present	(-)	(-)	13 (0)	6 (0)	3 (0)	22 (0)
16	DF	(Tajikistan) Tabrez Islomov	2016–2021, 2022–Present	(-)	4 (0)	8 (-)	7 (0)	3 (0)	22 (0)
18	GK	(Tajikistan) Rustam Yatimov	2017, 2018–2024	(-)	1 (0)	19 (0)	(-)	(-)	20 (0)
19	DF	(Tajikistan) Davronjon Ergashev	2011–2012, 2016, 2018	9 (3)	10 (0)	(-)	(-)	(-)	19 (3)
19	DF	(Tajikistan) Sodikjon Kurbonov	2023–Present	(-)	(-)	7 (0)	11 (0)	2 (0)	19 (0)
21	DF	(Ukraine) Petro Kovalchuk	2015–2016	(-)	17 (0)	(-)	(-)	(-)	17 (0)
21	MF	(Tajikistan) Shahrom Sulaymonov	2018–2023, 2025	(-)	1 (0)	15 (1)	1 (0)	(-)	17 (1)
23	MF	(Tajikistan) Parvizdzhon Umarbayev	2015–2016	(-)	16 (1)	(-)	(-)	(-)	16 (1)
24	DF	(Tajikistan) Iskandar Dzhalilov	2013–2014, 2019–2022	(-)	7 (0)	8 (0)	(-)	(-)	15 (0)
24	DF	(Tajikistan) Eraj Rajabov	2009–2015	10 (0)	5 (0)	(-)	(-)	(-)	15 (0)
24	DF	(Ukraine) Artem Baranovskyi	2017–2018	(-)	15 (0)	(-)	(-)	(-)	15 (0)
27	DF	(Iran) Mehdi Chahjouyi	2015–2016	(-)	14 (1)	(-)	(-)	(-)	14 (1)
28	MF	(Tajikistan) Jahongir Aliev	2016–2017	(-)	13 (2)	(-)	(-)	(-)	13 (2)
29	FW	(Tajikistan) Sheriddin Boboev	2015–2020	(-)	10 (1)	2 (0)	(-)	(-)	12 (1)
29	DF	(Tajikistan) Manuchekhr Safarov	2021, 2025–Present	(-)	(-)	6 (2)	6 (0)	0 (0)	12 (2)
31	MF	(Tajikistan) Khurshed Makhmudov	2014–2016	(-)	11 (4)	(-)	(-)	(-)	11 (4)
31	FW	(Russia) Dmitry Barkov	2017	(-)	11 (3)	(-)	(-)	(-)	11 (3)
33	MF	(Tajikistan) Ibrahim Rabimov	2011–2013	10 (3)	(-)	(-)	(-)	(-)	10 (3)
33	DF	(Tajikistan) Sokhib Suvonkulov	2009–2013, 2014–2017	9 (0)	1 (0)	(-)	(-)	(-)	10 (0)
33	MF	(Ghana) David Mawutor	2014, 2016–2018	(-)	10 (2)	(-)	(-)	(-)	10 (2)
33	FW	(Spain) Manolo Bleda	2014–2015	(-)	10 (1)	(-)	(-)	(-)	10 (1)
33	DF	(Tajikistan) Vahdat Hanonov	2020–2021, 2026–Present	(-)	(-)	7 (1)	(-)	3 (0)	10 (1)
38	MF	(Tajikistan) Nozim Babadjanov	2016–2017, 2018–2019	(-)	8 (0)	1 (0)	(-)	(-)	9 (0)
38	MF	(Tajikistan) Zoir Dzhuraboyev	2019–2022	(-)	1 (0)	8 (-)	(-)	(-)	9 (0)
38	FW	(Tajikistan) Yusuf Rabiev	2009–2012	9 (1)	(-)	(-)	(-)	(-)	9 (1)
38	FW	(Tajikistan) Mahmadali Sodikov	2011–2012	9 (1)	(-)	(-)	(-)	(-)	9 (1)
38	MF	(Tajikistan) Amadoni Kamolov	2023–2025	(-)	(-)	6 (0)	3 (0)	(-)	9 (0)
43	GK	(Tajikistan) Alisher Tuychiev	2011–2015	7 (0)	1 (0)	(-)	(-)	(-)	8 (0)
43	MF	(Tajikistan) Umedzhon Sharipov	2012–2015	2 (1)	6 (0)	(-)	(-)	(-)	8 (1)
45	DF	(Uzbekistan) Jalil Kimsanov	2019	(-)	6 (1)	1 (0)	(-)	(-)	7 (1)
45	FW	(Tajikistan) Farkhod Tokhirov	2010–2012, 2012	7 (6)	(-)	(-)	(-)	(-)	7 (6)
45	MF	(Nigeria) Joseph Okoro	2023, 2025	(-)	(-)	2 (0)	5 (0)	(-)	7 (0)
45	DF	(Tajikistan) Alidzhon Karomatullozoda	2022–2024, 2026–Present	(-)	(-)	4 (0)	(-)	3 (0)	7 (0)
49	DF	(Ukraine) Andriy Mishchenko	2021	(-)	(-)	6 (0)	(-)	(-)	6 (0)
49	DF	(Russia) Nikita Chicherin	2022	(-)	(-)	6 (0)	(-)	(-)	6 (0)
49	DF	(Croatia) Ivan Novoselec	2023–2024	(-)	(-)	6 (0)	(-)	(-)	6 (0)
49	MF	(Belarus) Mikalay Zyanko	2018	(-)	6 (2)	(-)	(-)	(-)	6 (2)
49	MF	(Serbia) Mihajlo Cakić	2019	(-)	5 (1)	1 (0)	(-)	(-)	6 (1)
49	MF	(Uzbekistan) Mukhammad Isaev	2022	(-)	(-)	6 (1)	(-)	(-)	6 (1)
49	MF	(Bosnia and Herzegovina) Dženis Beganović	2023–2024	(-)	(-)	6 (0)	(-)	(-)	6 (0)
49	FW	(Tajikistan) Ruslan Rafikov	2011–2012	6 (0)	(-)	(-)	(-)	(-)	6 (0)
49	FW	(Tajikistan) Komron Tursunov	2018–2019	(-)	5 (0)	1 (0)	(-)	(-)	6 (0)
49	FW	(Tajikistan) Islom Zoirov	2021–2022	(-)	(-)	6 (0)	(-)	(-)	6 (0)
49	FW	(Gabon) Eric Bocoum	2022	(-)	(-)	6 (1)	(-)	(-)	6 (1)
49	FW	(Ivory Coast) Senin Sebai	2023	(-)	(-)	6 (2)	(-)	(-)	6 (2)
49	GK	(Tajikistan) Mukhriddin Khasanov	2021–Present	(-)	(-)	3 (0)	3 (0)	0 (0)	6 (0)
49	DF	(Australia) Matthew Millar	2024	(-)	(-)	(-)	6 (0)	(-)	6 (0)
49	DF	(Uzbekistan) Marlen Chobanov	2025	(-)	(-)	(-)	6 (0)	(-)	6 (0)
49	FW	(Nigeria) Paul Komolafe	2025	(-)	(-)	(-)	6 (2)	(-)	6 (2)
49	FW	(Tajikistan) Shahrom Samiev	2019–2020, 2026–Present	(-)	4 (1)	(-)	(-)	2 (0)	6 (1)
66	DF	(Belarus) Uladzislaw Kasmynin	2022	(-)	(-)	5 (1)	(-)	(-)	5 (1)
66	MF	(Ukraine) Oleksandr Kablash	2016	(-)	5 (2)	(-)	(-)	(-)	5 (2)
66	MF	(Tajikistan) Akmal Kholmatov	2016	(-)	5 (0)	(-)	(-)	(-)	5 (0)
66	MF	(Ukraine) Oleksandr Stetsenko	2017	(-)	5 (0)	(-)	(-)	(-)	5 (0)
66	MF	(Tajikistan) Khurshed-Timur Dzhuraev	2019–2021	(-)	1 (0)	4 (0)	(-)	(-)	5 (0)
66	MF	(Iran) Siavash Hagh Nazari	2025	(-)	(-)	(-)	5 (0)	(-)	5 (0)
72	GK	(Uzbekistan) Farhot Yuldashev	2012–2013	4 (0)	(-)	(-)	(-)	(-)	4 (0)
72	DF	(Tajikistan) Umed Khabibulloyev	2010–2012	4 (0)	(-)	(-)	(-)	(-)	4 (0)
72	DF	(Tajikistan) Daler Imomnazarov	2021–2023	(-)	(-)	4 (0)	(-)	(-)	4 (0)
72	DF	(Armenia) Artur Kartashyan	2023	(-)	(-)	4 (0)	(-)	(-)	4 (0)
72	DF	(Ivory Coast) Cédric Gogoua	2023	(-)	(-)	4 (0)	(-)	(-)	4 (0)
72	DF	(Japan) Keita Suzuki	2024	(-)	(-)	(-)	4 (0)	(-)	4 (0)
72	FW	(Bulgaria) Dimitar Mitkov	2024	(-)	(-)	(-)	4 (0)	(-)	4 (0)
72	MF	(Iran) Reza Dehghani	2025	(-)	(-)	(-)	4 (1)	(-)	4 (1)
72	FW	(Tajikistan) Masrur Gafurov	2022–Present	(-)	(-)	(-)	4 (1)	0 (0)	4 (1)
81	DF	(Tajikistan) Farkhod Vasiyev	2017	(-)	3 (0)	(-)	(-)	(-)	3 (0)
81	DF	(Serbia) Marko Milić	2020	(-)	1 (0)	2 (0)	(-)	(-)	3 (0)
81	MF	(Tajikistan) Firuz Bobiev	2011–2012	3 (0)	(-)	(-)	(-)	(-)	3 (0)
81	MF	(Russia) Aleksandr Kudryashov	2012	3 (0)	(-)	(-)	(-)	(-)	3 (0)
81	MF	(Germany) Alexander Frank	2012–2013	3 (0)	(-)	(-)	(-)	(-)	3 (0)
81	MF	(Tajikistan) Faridoon Sharipov	2016–2017	(-)	3 (0)	(-)	(-)	(-)	3 (0)
81	FW	(Armenia) Ruslan Koryan	2019	(-)	3 (2)	(-)	(-)	(-)	3 (2)
81	FW	(Tajikistan) Jahongir Ergashev	2012–2015, 2017	(-)	3 (0)	(-)	(-)	(-)	3 (0)
81	FW	(Netherlands) Hüseyin Doğan	2021	(-)	(-)	3 (0)	(-)	(-)	3 (0)
81	MF	(Brazil) Murilo Souza	2024	(-)	(-)	(-)	3 (0)	(-)	3 (0)
81	FW	(Italy) Francesco Margiotta	2024	(-)	(-)	(-)	3 (0)	(-)	3 (0)
81	DF	(North Macedonia) Darko Ilieski	2024	(-)	(-)	(-)	3 (0)	(-)	3 (0)
81	DF	(Russia) Kirill Suslov	2025	(-)	(-)	(-)	3 (0)	(-)	3 (0)
81	FW	(Croatia) Frane Ikić	2026–Present	(-)	(-)	(-)	(-)	3 (0)	3 (0)
81	FW	(Tajikistan) Alisher Shukurov	2026–Present	(-)	(-)	(-)	(-)	3 (1)	3 (1)
81	FW	(Russia) Denis Kavlinov	2026–Present	(-)	(-)	(-)	(-)	3 (0)	3 (0)
97	DF	(Tajikistan) Akmal Saburov	2011–2012	2 (1)	(-)	(-)	(-)	(-)	2 (1)
97	MF	(Belarus) Sergey Tikhonovsky	2018	(-)	2 (0)	(-)	(-)	(-)	2 (0)
97	MF	(Russia) Viktor Svezhov	2020–2021	(-)	(-)	2 (0)	(-)	(-)	2 (0)
97	DF	(Tajikistan) Rustam Kamolov	2022–Present	(-)	(-)	(-)	2 (1)	0 (0)	2 (1)
97	DF	(Albania) Rudolf Turkaj	2025	(-)	(-)	(-)	2 (0)	(-)	2 (0)
97	FW	(Ukraine) Oleksiy Shchebetun	2026–Present	(-)	(-)	(-)	(-)	2 (0)	2 (0)
97	FW	(Tajikistan) Mekhrubon Odilzoda	2025–Present	(-)	(-)	(-)	0 (0)	2 (0)	2 (0)
104	DF	(Tajikistan) Bakhtior Kalandarov	2019	(-)	(-)	1 (0)	(-)	(-)	1 (0)
104	DF	(Ukraine) Temur Partsvania	2022	(-)	(-)	1 (0)	(-)	(-)	1 (0)
104	MF	(Tajikistan) Dadakhon Muminov	2012	1 (0)	(-)	(-)	(-)	(-)	1 (0)
104	MF	(Tajikistan) Shahzod Suleimonov	2012	1 (0)	(-)	(-)	(-)	(-)	1 (0)
104	MF	(Tajikistan) Sharifbek Rakhmatov	2020	(-)	(-)	1 (0)	(-)	(-)	1 (0)
104	MF	(Tajikistan) Salam Ashurmamadov	2019	(-)	(-)	1 (0)	(-)	(-)	1 (0)
104	MF	(Japan) Ryota Noma	2021	(-)	(-)	1 (0)	(-)	(-)	1 (0)
104	FW	(Tajikistan) Firdavs Kurbonov	2012	1 (0)	(-)	(-)	(-)	(-)	1 (0)
104	FW	(Turkmenistan) Wahyt Orazsähedow	2020	(-)	1 (0)	(-)	(-)	(-)	1 (0)
104	FW	(Russia) Mikhail Tikhonov	2026–Present	(-)	(-)	(-)	0 (0)	1 (0)	1 (0)

=== Goalscorers ===
As of match played 23 October 2026

	Name	Years	AFC President's Cup	AFC Cup	AFC Champions League	AFC Champions League Two	AFC Challenge League	Total	Ratio
1	(Tajikistan) Manuchekhr Dzhalilov	2015–2017, 2020–2025	(-)	11 (29)	4 (15)	0 (6)	(-)	15 (50)	0.3
2	(Tajikistan) Dilshod Vasiyev	2009–2019	4 (10)	8 (32)	(-)	(-)	(-)	12 (42)	0.29
3	(Tajikistan) Fatkhullo Fatkhulloyev	2011–2017, 2018–2019	4 (10)	7 (40)	0 (1)	(-)	(-)	11 (51)	0.22
4	(Tajikistan) Farkhod Tokhirov	2010–2012, 2012	6 (7)	(-)	(-)	(-)	(-)	6 (7)	0.86
4	(Tajikistan) Alisher Dzhalilov	2019–2022, 2023–Present	(-)	3 (7)	3 (16)	0 (8)	0 (3)	6 (34)	0.18
6	Own goal	2011–Present	0 (10)	4 (42)	1 (22)	0 (12)	0 (2)	5 (88)	0.06
7	(Tajikistan) Nuriddin Davronov	2009–2012, 2013–2016, 2017, 2017–20128, 2019, 2022	1 (10)	3 (26)	0 (10)	(-)	(-)	4 (46)	0.09
7	(Tajikistan) Khurshed Makhmudov	2014–2016	(-)	4 (11)	(-)	(-)	(-)	4 (11)	0.36
9	(Tajikistan) Davronjon Ergashev	2011–2012, 2016, 2018	3 (9)	0 (10)	(-)	(-)	(-)	3 (19)	0.16
9	(Tajikistan) Ibrahim Rabimov	2011–2013	3 (10)	(-)	(-)	(-)	(-)	3 (10)	0.3
9	(Tajikistan) Akhtam Nazarov	2013–2019, 2020–2023, 2023–2025	(-)	3 (38)	0 (11)	0 (5)	(-)	3 (54)	0.06
9	(Russia) Dmitry Barkov	2017	(-)	3 (11)	(-)	(-)	(-)	3 (11)	0.27
9	(Tajikistan) Amirbek Juraboev	2016–2019, 2020–2022, 2024–Present	(-)	0 (19)	0 (3)	3 (11)	0 (3)	3 (37)	0.08
9	(Tajikistan) Rustam Soirov	2020–2022, 2024–Present	(-)	0 (1)	1 (13)	1 (12)	1 (3)	3 (29)	0.1
15	(Ukraine) Oleksandr Kablash	2016	(-)	2 (5)	(-)	(-)	(-)	2 (5)	0.4
15	(Tajikistan) Jahongir Aliev	2016–2017	(-)	2 (13)	(-)	(-)	(-)	2 (13)	0.15
15	(Ghana) David Mawutor	2014, 2016–2018	(-)	2 (10)	(-)	(-)	(-)	2 (10)	0.2
15	(Tajikistan) Romish Jalilov	2012–2018, 2020–2021, 2023, 2025–Present	0 (0)	2 (17)	0 (5)	0 (1)	(-)	2 (23)	0.09
15	(Belarus) Mikalay Zyanko	2018	(-)	2 (6)	(-)	(-)	(-)	2 (6)	0.33
15	(Tajikistan) Mukhammadzhon Rakhimov	2017–2021, 2022–2023, 2025–Present	(-)	0 (16)	2 (15)	0 (3)	0 (2)	2 (36)	0.06
15	(Uzbekistan) Jalil Kimsanov	2019	(-)	1 (6)	1 (1)	(-)	(-)	2 (7)	0.29
15	(Tajikistan) Manuchekhr Safarov	2021, 2025–Present	(-)	(-)	2 (6)	0 (6)	0 (0)	2 (12)	0.17
15	(Ivory Coast) Senin Sebai	2023	(-)	(-)	2 (6)	(-)	(-)	2 (6)	0.33
15	(Tajikistan) Ehson Panjshanbe	2016–2020, 2023–2024, 2025, 2026–Present	(-)	1 (16)	0 (9)	1 (12)	0 (3)	2 (40)	0.05
15	(Nigeria) Paul Komolafe	2025	(-)	(-)	(-)	2 (6)	(-)	2 (6)	0.33
26	(Tajikistan) Akmal Saburov	2011–2012	1 (2)	(-)	(-)	(-)	(-)	1 (2)	0.5
26	(Tajikistan) Yusuf Rabiev	2009–2012	1 (9)	(-)	(-)	(-)	(-)	1 (9)	0.11
26	(Tajikistan) Mahmadali Sodikov	2011–2012	1 (9)	(-)	(-)	(-)	(-)	1 (9)	0.11
26	(Tajikistan) Umedzhon Sharipov	2012–2015	1 (2)	0 (6)	(-)	(-)	(-)	1 (8)	0.13
26	(Spain) Manolo Bleda	2014–2015	(-)	1 (10)	(-)	(-)	(-)	1 (10)	0.1
26	(Iran) Mehdi Chahjouyi	2015–2016	(-)	1 (14)	(-)	(-)	(-)	1 (14)	0.07
26	(Tajikistan) Parvizdzhon Umarbayev	2015–2016	(-)	1 (16)	(-)	(-)	(-)	1 (16)	0.06
26	(Tajikistan) Sheriddin Boboev	2015–2020	(-)	1 (10)	0 (2)	(-)	(-)	1 (12)	0.08
26	(Serbia) Mihajlo Cakić	2019	(-)	1 (5)	0 (1)	(-)	(-)	1 (6)	0.17
26	(Tajikistan) Shahrom Samiev	2019–2020	(-)	1 (4)	0 (0)	(-)	(-)	1 (4)	0.25
26	(Tajikistan) Vakhdat Khanonov	2020–2021	(-)	(-)	1 (7)	(-)	(-)	1 (7)	0.14
26	(Tajikistan) Shahrom Sulaymonov	2018–2023, 2025	(-)	0 (1)	1 (15)	0 (1)	(-)	1 (17)	0.06
26	(Uzbekistan) Mukhammad Isaev	2022	(-)	(-)	1 (6)	(-)	(-)	1 (6)	0.17
26	(Gabon) Eric Bocoum	2022	(-)	(-)	1 (6)	(-)	(-)	1 (6)	0.17
26	(Belarus) Uladzislaw Kasmynin	2022	(-)	(-)	1 (5)	(-)	(-)	1 (5)	0.2
26	(Iran) Reza Dehghani	2025	(-)	(-)	(-)	1 (4)	(-)	1 (4)	0.25
26	(Tajikistan) Alisher Shukurov	2026–Present	(-)	(-)	(-)	(-)	1 (3)	1 (3)	0.33

=== Clean sheets ===
As of match played 23 October 2026

	Name	Years	AFC President's Cup	AFC Cup	AFC Champions League	AFC Champions League Two	AFC Challenge League	Total	Ratio
1	(Serbia) Nikola Stošić	2013–2020, 2024–2025	(-)	11 (39)	0 (1)	1 (9)	(-)	12 (49)	0.24
2	(Tajikistan) Rustam Yatimov	2017, 2018–2024	(-)	1 (1)	4 (19)	(-)	(-)	5 (20)	0.25
3	(Uzbekistan) Farhot Yuldashev	2012–2013	2 (4)	(-)	(-)	(-)	(-)	2 (4)	0.5
3	(Tajikistan) Alisher Tuychiev	2011–2015	2 (7)	0 (1)	(-)	(-)	(-)	2 (8)	0.25
5	(Russia) Denis Kavlinov	2026–Present	(-)	(-)	(-)	(-)	1 (3)	1 (3)	0.33
6	(Tajikistan) Mukhriddin Khasanov	2021–Present	(-)	(-)	0 (3)	0 (3)	(-)	0 (6)	0

== Overall record ==
=== By competition ===
As of match played 23 October 2026

Competition	Pld	W	D	L	GF	GA
AFC President's Cup	10	6	3	1	20	7
AFC Cup	42	19	10	13	69	55
AFC Champions League	22	5	4	13	21	33
AFC Champions League Two	12	3	0	9	8	25
AFC Challenge League	3	1	0	2	2	3
Total	89	34	17	38	120	123

Legend: GF = Goals For. GA = Goals Against. GD = Goal Difference.

=== By country ===
As of match played 23 October 2026

Country	Pld	W	D	L	GF	GA	GD	Win%
Bhutan	1	1	0	0	8	0	+8	100.00
Cambodia	1	0	1	0	1	1	+0	0.00
India	4	3	1	0	7	3	+4	75.00
Iran	5	0	1	4	1	10	−9	0.00
Iraq	7	1	1	5	4	10	−6	14.29
Jordan	4	0	1	3	2	6	−4	0.00
Kuwait	5	3	1	1	9	6	+3	60.00
Kyrgyzstan	9	8	0	1	24	8	+16	88.89
Lebanon	3	0	0	3	1	5	−4	0.00
Malaysia	3	1	0	2	5	4	+1	33.33
Myanmar	1	0	1	0	1	1	+0	0.00
Palestine	3	3	0	0	8	1	+7	100.00
Philippines	2	1	1	0	5	1	+4	50.00
Qatar	4	0	1	3	2	6	−4	0.00
Saudi Arabia	9	1	1	7	7	22	−15	11.11
Syria	2	0	1	1	1	3	−2	0.00
Taiwan	1	0	0	1	0	2	−2	0.00
Tajikistan	3	2	0	1	7	3	+4	66.67
Turkmenistan	12	6	5	1	20	13	+7	50.00
United Arab Emirates	6	2	1	3	5	6	−1	33.33
Uzbekistan	4	2	0	2	7	8	−1	50.00

=== By club ===
As of match played 23 October 2026

Country	Pld	W	D	L	GF	GA	GD	Win%
(Bhutan) Yeedzin	1	1	0	0	8	0	+8	100.00
(Cambodia) Phnom Penh Crown	1	0	1	0	1	1	+0	0.00
(India) Bengaluru	2	1	1	0	3	2	+1	50.00
(India) Goa	2	2	0	0	4	1	+3	100.00
(Iran) Persepolis	3	0	1	2	1	4	−3	0.00
(Iran) Sepahan	2	0	0	2	0	6	−6	0.00
(Iraq) Al-Quwa Al-Jawiya	1	0	0	1	0	1	−1	0.00
(Iraq) Al-Zawraa	2	1	0	1	3	3	+0	50.00
(Iraq) Erbil	2	0	1	1	1	3	−2	0.00
(Iraq) Naft Al-Wasat	2	0	0	2	0	3	−3	0.00
(Jordan) Al-Faisaly	2	0	1	1	2	4	−2	0.00
(Jordan) Al-Wehdat	2	0	0	2	0	2	−2	0.00
(Kuwait) Al-Arabi	1	1	0	0	2	0	+2	100.00
Al-Kuwait	2	1	0	1	3	4	−1	50.00
(Kuwait) Qadsia	2	1	1	0	4	2	+2	50.00
(Kyrgyzstan) Alay Osh	4	4	0	0	11	4	+7	100.00
(Kyrgyzstan) Dordoi Bishkek	5	4	0	1	13	4	+9	80.00
(Lebanon) Nejmeh	1	0	0	1	0	1	−1	0.00
(Lebanon) Tripoli	2	0	0	2	1	4	−3	0.00
(Malaysia) Johor Darul Ta'zim	1	0	0	1	0	1	−1	0.00
(Malaysia) Pahang FA	2	1	0	1	5	3	+2	50.00
(Myanmar) Yadanarbon	1	0	1	0	1	1	+0	0.00
(Palestine) Jabal Al-Mukaber	1	1	0	0	2	0	+2	100.00
(Palestine) Markaz Shabab Al-Am'ari	2	2	0	0	3	1	+2	100.00
(Philippines) Ceres Negros	2	1	1	0	5	1	+4	50.00
(Qatar) Al-Duhail	2	0	1	1	0	2	−2	0.00
(Qatar) Al-Rayyan	2	0	0	2	2	4	−2	0.00
(Saudi Arabia) Al-Ahli	1	0	0	1	0	1	−1	0.00
(Saudi Arabia) Al Hilal	4	1	0	3	5	8	−3	25.00
(Saudi Arabia) Al Nassr	4	0	1	3	2	13	−11	0.00
(Syria) Homs Al Fidaa	1	0	0	1	0	2	−2	0.00
(Syria) Al-Wahda	1	0	1	0	1	1	+0	0.00
(Taiwan) Taipower	1	0	0	1	0	2	−2	0.00
(Tajikistan) Khujand	3	2	0	1	7	3	+4	66.67
(Turkmenistan) Ahal	4	4	0	0	9	3	+6	100.00
(Turkmenistan) Altyn Asyr	6	1	4	1	8	8	+0	16.67
(Turkmenistan) Balkan	2	1	1	0	3	2	+1	50.00
(United Arab Emirates) Shabab Al Ahli	2	1	1	0	1	0	+1	50.00
(United Arab Emirates) Sharjah	4	1	0	3	4	6	−2	25.00
(Uzbekistan) AGMK	3	1	0	2	6	8	−2	33.33
(Uzbekistan) Lokomotiv Tashkent	1	1	0	0	1	0	+1	100.00
