= 2019 FC Istiklol season =

FC Istiklol
2019 season
- President: Shohruh Saidov
- Manager: Khakim Fuzailov (until 27 June); Alisher Tukhtaev (Caretaker) (from 27 June)
- Stadium: Republican Stadium
- Tajik League: 1st
- Tajik Cup: Winners
- Tajik Supercup: Winners
- AFC Champions League: Preliminary round 2 vs AGMK
- AFC Cup: Group Stage
- Top goalscorer: League: Sheriddin Boboev (14); All: Sheriddin Boboev (19)

The FC Istiklol 2019 season was Istiklol's eleventh Tajik League season. They were defending Tajik League and Cup Champions, whilst also participating in the Tajik Supercup, AFC Champions League and AFC Cup.

Istiklol defended their Tajik League and Tajik Cup titles, whilst also winning the Tajik Supercup. In continental competitions they were knocked out of the AFC Champions League at the Preliminary round 2 stage by AGMK, and then at the group stage of the AFC Cup.

== Season events ==
On 3 December 2018, Khakim Fuzailov was announced as Istiklol's new manager. On 27 June, Fuzailov resigned as manager after Istiklol to progress from the group stages of the AFC Cup, with Alisher Tukhtaev being appointed as Caretaker Manager in his place. On 2 July, Istiklol parted company with Jalil Kimsanov, Mihajlo Cakić and Ruslan Koryan by mutual consent.

On 19 July, Fatkhullo Fatkhuloev moved to Uzbekistan Super League club FK Buxoro.

On 24 July, Tabrezi Davlatmir and Ehson Panjshanbe signed new contracts with Istiklol, keeping them at the club until the end of 2020. The following day, 25 July, Bakhtior Kalandarov was released by mutual consent. On 26 July, Amirbek Juraboev left Istiklol to join Navbahor Namangan of the Uzbekistan Super League on a free transfer.

On 31 July, Istiklol announced the signings of Dzhamshed Rakhmonov, Khurshed-Timur Dzhuraev and Salam Ashurmamdov to two-year contracts.

== Squad ==
As of match played 24 November 2019

No.	Name	Nationality	Position	Date of birth (age)	Signed from	Signed in	Contract ends	Apps.	Goals
Goalkeepers
1	Rustam Yatimov	(Tajikistan)	GK	13 July 1998 (aged 21)		2018	2020	24	0
22	Nikola Stošić	(Serbia)	GK	15 March 1994 (aged 25)	Železničar Beograd	2013		141	0
Defenders
3	Tabrezi Davlatmir	(Tajikistan)	DF	6 June 1998 (aged 21)	Trainee	2016	2020	66	0
4	Shakhzod Davlatov	(Tajikistan)	DF			2019		7	0
5	Iskandar Dzhalilov	(Tajikistan)	DF	1 June 1992 (aged 27)	Botev Vratsa	2019		34	2
6	Zoir Juraboev	(Tajikistan)	DF	16 September 1998 (aged 21)	Metallurg Bekabad	2019		25	1
7	Dzhamshed Rakhmonov	(Russia)	DF	9 April 1997 (aged 22)		2019	2021	12	0
19	Akhtam Nazarov	(Tajikistan)	DF	29 September 1992 (aged 27)	Energetik Dushanbe	2013		185	22
21	Oleksiy Larin	(Ukraine)	DF	4 June 1994 (aged 25)	Arsenal Kyiv	2019		28	1
40	Sorbon Giyosov	(Tajikistan)	DF	15 September 2000 (aged 19)	Trainee	2019		2	0
Midfielders
9	Khurshed-Timur Dzhuraev	(Tajikistan)	MF	21 September 1997 (aged 22)		2019	2021	11	0
10	Alisher Dzhalilov	(Tajikistan)	MF	29 August 1993 (aged 26)	Baltika Kaliningrad	2019		27	16
11	Muhammadjon Rakhimov	(Tajikistan)	MF	15 October 1998 (aged 21)	Khosilot Farkhor	2017		70	15
17	Ehson Panjshanbe	(Tajikistan)	MF	12 May 1999 (aged 20)	Trainee	2016	2020	84	14
18	Saidmuxtor Azimov	(Tajikistan)	MF	9 June 2000 (aged 19)	Barkchi	2019		9	0
20	Salam Ashurmamadov	(Tajikistan)	MF	18 March 2003 (aged 16)		2019	2021	5	1
70	Shakhrom Sulaimonov	(Tajikistan)	MF	27 June 1997 (aged 22)	Utenis Utena	2018		39	2
Forwards
14	Sheriddin Boboev	(Tajikistan)	ST	21 April 1999 (aged 20)	Trainee	2016		70	41
23	Shahrom Samiyev	(Tajikistan)	ST	8 February 2001 (aged 18)	CSKA Pamir Dushanbe	2019		29	11
28	Komron Tursunov	(Tajikistan)	ST	24 April 1996 (aged 23)	Regar-TadAZ	2018		48	7
30	Mukhammad Khakimzoda	(Tajikistan)	ST	18 February 2000 (aged 19)	Trainee	2019		5	1
Youth team players
	Amir Nigmatov	(Tajikistan)	DF	28 April 1999 (aged 20)	Trainee	2018		2	0
	Shahbol Rajabov	(Tajikistan)	DF	4 January 2000 (aged 19)	Trainee	2018		1	0
	Farhod Kosimov	(Tajikistan)	MF	18 September 2000 (aged 19)	Trainee	2018		9	0
Out on loan
	Ziyovuddin Fuzaylov	(Tajikistan)	DF	7 March 2000 (aged 19)	Youth Team	2015		21	5
Left during the season
2	Jalil Kimsanov	(Uzbekistan)	DF	26 February 1986 (aged 33)	Neftchi Fergana	2019		14	3
4	Bakhtior Kalandarov	(Tajikistan)	DF	14 June 1992 (aged 27)	Regar-TadAZ	2019		8	0
7	Mihajlo Cakić	(Serbia)	MF	27 May 1990 (aged 29)	Sinđelić Beograd	2019		8	1
8	Nuriddin Davronov	(Tajikistan)	MF	16 January 1991 (aged 28)		2019		103+	9+
9	Ruslan Koryan	(Armenia)	ST	15 June 1988 (aged 31)	Pyunik	2019		5	4
13	Nozim Babadjanov	(Tajikistan)	MF	7 August 1995 (aged 24)	Chernomorets Balchik	2018		61	12
18	Fatkhullo Fatkhuloev	(Tajikistan)	MF	24 March 1990 (aged 29)	Persela Lamongan	2018		190+	65+
20	Amirbek Juraboev	(Tajikistan)	MF	13 April 1996 (aged 23)	Barki Tajik	2016		98	6
36	Behrouz Hayriev	(Tajikistan)	GK	1 May 1998 (aged 21)	Trainee	2017		0	0
	Firuz Karayev	(Tajikistan)	DF	9 March 1994 (aged 25)	Regar-TadAZ	2019		0	0

== Transfers ==
=== In ===
Date	Position	Nationality	Name	From	Fee	Ref.
	DF	(Tajikistan)	Iskandar Dzhalilov	Botev Vratsa	Undisclosed	
	DF	(Tajikistan)	Zoir Juraboev	Metallurg Bekabad	Undisclosed	
	DF	(Tajikistan)	Bakhtior Kalandarov	Regar-TadAZ	Undisclosed	
	DF	(Ukraine)	Oleksiy Larin	Arsenal Kyiv	Undisclosed	
	DF	(Uzbekistan)	Jalil Kimsanov	Neftchi Fergana	Undisclosed	
	MF	(Tajikistan)	Alisher Dzhalilov	Baltika Kaliningrad	Undisclosed	
	MF	(Serbia)	Mihajlo Cakić	Sinđelić Beograd	Undisclosed	
	MF	(Tajikistan)	Nuriddin Davronov		Free	
	FW	(Armenia)	Ruslan Koryan	Pyunik	Undisclosed	
	FW	(Tajikistan)	Dzhamshed Maksumov	Arsenal Tula	Undisclosed	
	FW	(Tajikistan)	Shahrom Samiyev	CSKA Pamir Dushanbe	Undisclosed	
31 July 2019	DF	(Russia)	Dzhamshed Rakhmonov		Free	
31 July 2019	MF	(Tajikistan)	Khurshed-Timur Dzhuraev		Free	
31 July 2019	MF	(Tajikistan)	Salam Ashurmamdov		Free	

=== Out ===
Date	Position	Nationality	Name	To	Fee	Ref.
	DF	(Tajikistan)	Siyovush Asrorov	PKNP FC	Undisclosed	
21 November 2019	DF	(Tajikistan)	Akhtam Nazarov	Bashundhara Kings	Undisclosed	

=== Loans out ===
Date	Position	Nationality	Name	To	Fee	Ref.
Winter 2019	DF	(Tajikistan)	Ziёvuddin Fuzaylov	Istaravshan	End of Season	

=== Released ===
Date	Position	Nationality	Name	Joined	Date	Ref.
Winter 2019	DF	(Tajikistan)	Khurshedi Zainiddin			
Winter 2019	FW	(Afghanistan)	Hamid Golami			
14 January 2019	MF	(Uzbekistan)	Jahongir Abdumominov	Persija Jakarta		
21 January 2019	FW	(Tajikistan)	Dilshod Vasiev	Khujand	5 February 2019	
27 January 2019	DF	(Tajikistan)	Alisher Sharipov	Regar-TadAZ		
27 January 2019	DF	(Ukraine)	Artem Baranovskyi	Shakhter Karagandy	13 February 2019	
28 February 2019	DF	(Tajikistan)	Behrouz Hayriev	Kuktosh Rudaki		
28 February 2019	MF	(Tajikistan)	Firuz Karayev			
28 February 2019	MF	(Tajikistan)	Nozim Babadjanov	Regar-TadAZ		
2 July 2019	DF	(Uzbekistan)	Jalil Kimsanov	Andijon		
2 July 2019	MF	(Serbia)	Mihajlo Cakić	Sinđelić Beograd		
2 July 2019	FW	(Armenia)	Ruslan Koryan	Fakel Voronezh		
19 July 2019	MF	(Tajikistan)	Fatkhullo Fatkhuloev	FK Buxoro	19 July 2019	
25 July 2019	DF	(Tajikistan)	Bakhtior Kalandarov	Kuktosh Rudaki		
26 July 2019	MF	(Tajikistan)	Amirbek Juraboev	Navbahor Namangan	26 July 2019	
22 August 2019	MF	(Tajikistan)	Nuriddin Davronov	Oman Club	22 August 2019	
26 December 2019	FW	(Tajikistan)	Komron Tursunov	Mohun Bagan	26 December 2019	
31 December 2019	DF	(Tajikistan)	Ziyovuddin Fuzaylov			
31 December 2019	DF	(Tajikistan)	Sorbon Giyosov	Lokomotiv-Pamir		
31 December 2019	FW	(Tajikistan)	Mukhammad Khakimzoda			

=== Trial ===
Date From	Position	Nationality	Name	Last club	Date To	Ref.
January 2019	DF	(Tajikistan)	Iskandar Dzhalilov	Botev Vratsa		
January 2019	DF	(Tajikistan)	Bakhtior Kalandarov	Regar-TadAZ		
January 2019	DF	(Ukraine)	Oleksiy Larin	Arsenal Kyiv		
January 2019	MF	(Tajikistan)	Alisher Dzhalilov	Baltika Kaliningrad		
January 2019	MF	(Serbia)	Mihajlo Cakić	Sinđelić Beograd		
January 2019	MF	(Uzbekistan)	Jalil Kimsanov	Neftchi Fergana		
January 2019	MF	(Tajikistan)	Dzhamshed Maksumov	Arsenal Tula		
January 2019	FW	(Armenia)	Viulen Ayvazyan	Dnepr Mogilev		
February 2019	DF	(Tajikistan)	Zoir Juraboev	Metallurg Bekabad		
February 2019	MF	(Russia)	Mukhammad Sultonov	Rotor Volgograd		
February 2019	MF	(Turkmenistan)	Süleýman Muhadow	Ahal		
February 2019	FW	(Moldova)	Artiom Zabun	Victoria Bardar		
March 2019	FW	(Ukraine)	Yuriy Solomka	Kolos Kovalivka		

== Friendlies ==
8 January 2019	Istiklol	4–1	Tajikistan U23	Dushanbe
(UTC+5)	Tursunov 27', 66'; Uros Tomovic 58' (pen.); Babadjanov 68'	Report	Saidmukhtor Azimov 18'; Saidov (penalty missed) 73'	Stadium: Central Republican Stadium; Referee: Gulmurodi Sadullo

16 January 2019	Istiklol	5–1	Tajikistan U17	Dushanbe
(UTC+5)	Amadoni Kamolov 8' (o.g.); Uros Tomovic 14'; Nazarov 53' (pen.); Tursunov 60', 87'; Bekhruz Khiriyev (yellow card)	Report	Rustam Soirov 25' (pen.)	Stadium: Central Republican Stadium; Referee: Behruz Murtazoev

20 January 2019	Istiklol	0–0	Regar-TadAZ	Dushanbe
(UTC+5)	Juraboev (red card) 17'	Report	Safarali Karimov (red card) 17'; Daler Shomurodov (yellow card)	Stadium: Central Republican Stadium; Referee: Sayojon Zainiddinov

24 January 2019	Istiklol	1–0	CSKA Pamir Dushanbe	Dushanbe
(UTC+5)	Dzhalilov 44'; Shakhrom Samiev (yellow card)	Report		Stadium: Central Republican Stadium; Referee: Abdullo Davlatov

26 January 2019	Istiklol	7–1	Kuktosh Rudaki	Dushanbe
11:00 (UTC+5)	Ravshan Sodirov 10' (o.g.); Fatkhuloev 12'; Alisher Jalilov 20'; Dzhalilov 36', 55'; Jamshed Makhsumov 48'; Babadjanov 88'	Report	Mehrojiddin Muzaffarov 80'; Ismoil Alimardonov (yellow card)	Stadium: Central Republican Stadium; Attendance: 300; Referee: Sayojon Zainiddinov

29 January 2019	Istiklol (Tajikistan)	1–2	(Kazakhstan) Tobol	Antalya, Turkey
18:00 (UTC+5)	Fatkhuloev 15'	Report	Kankava; Fedin

31 January 2019	Istiklol (Tajikistan)	2–0	(Bosnia and Herzegovina) Čelik Zenica	Antalya, Turkey
17:30 (UTC+5)	Boboev 28'; Babadjanov 88'	Report

3 February 2019	Istiklol (Tajikistan)	1–1	(Denmark) Køge	Antalya, Turkey
(UTC+5)	Fatkhuloev 55'	Report	Huja 38'

6 February 2019	Istiklol (Tajikistan)	2–1	(Russia) Tom Tomsk	Antalya, Turkey
(UTC+5)	Panjshanbe 21'; I.Dzhalilov 65'	Report	Andreyev 85' (pen.)	Stadium: Arslan Sports Complex

7 February 2019	Istiklol (Tajikistan)	0–1	(Uzbekistan) Sogdiana Jizzakh	Antalya, Turkey
(UTC+5)		Report	O.Nurmatov 19'

12 March 2019	Oqtepa (Uzbekistan)	0–4	(Tajikistan) Istiklol	Tashkent, Uzbekistan
(UTC+5)	A.Ziyududdinov (penalty missed) 86'	Report	S.Samiev 5'; Tursunov 10'; Solomka 55'; J.Kimsanov 63'	Stadium: Chigatay Stadium; Referee: Ahmadzhon Ergashev

15 March 2019	Termez Surkhon (Uzbekistan)	2–4	(Tajikistan) Istiklol	Tashkent, Uzbekistan
(UTC+5)	A.Yusupov 8'; A.Alaniyazov 86'; S.Neymatov (penalty missed) 88'; U.Khalikulov (yellow card); Y.Abduvohidov (yellow card)	Report	Cakić 30', 72'; A.Dzhalilov 44'; Solomka 63'	Stadium: Chigatay Stadium; Referee: Ravshan Abduvakhidov

18 March 2019	Dinamo Samarqand (Uzbekistan)	1–0	(Tajikistan) Istiklol	Tashkent, Uzbekistan
(UTC+5)	A.Safarov 44'; K.Sharofutdinov (yellow card)	Report	N.Stošić (yellow card); Cakić (yellow card); Kalandarov (yellow card)	Stadium: Chigatay Stadium

== TFF Cup ==
=== Preliminary round ===
Pos	Team	Pld	W	D	L	GF	GA	GD	Pts	Qualification
1	(Tajikistan) Istiklol (Q)	6	6	0	0	26	4	+22	18	Advance to Group Stage
2	(Tajikistan) Regar-TadAZ Tursunzoda (Q)	6	4	1	1	17	4	+13	13	Advance to Group Stage
3	(Tajikistan) Dushanbe-83	6	2	2	2	10	7	+3	8	
4	(Tajikistan) Kuktosh Rudaki	6	2	1	3	15	15	0	7	
5	(Tajikistan) Shohmansur	6	2	0	4	7	21	−14	6	
6	(Tajikistan) CSKA Pamir Dushanbe	6	1	2	3	5	15	−10	5	
7	(Tajikistan) Khayr Vahdat	6	1	0	5	6	20	−14	3	

Updated to match(es) played on 20 February 2019. Source:
(Q) Qualified for the phase indicated

16 February 2019 1	CSKA Pamir Dushanbe	0–5	Istiklol	Hisor
14:00 (UTC+5)	M.Safarov (yellow card); S.Sharifi (yellow card)	Report	Tursunov 2', 23'; Larin 6'; Rakhimov 70'; Panjshanbe 82'; A.Dzhalilov (yellow card)	Stadium: Central Stadium; Referee: Nasrullo Kabirov

17 February 2019 2	Istiklol	6–2	Shohmansur	Hisor
14:00 (UTC+5)	Rakhimov 10'; S.Samiyev 27'; A.Dzhalilov 55' (pen.), 75'; Babadjanov 84'; M.Hakimzoda 88' (pen.)	Report	F.Kurbonov 30'; U.Badalov 77'	Stadium: Central Stadium; Referee: Amirdzhon Horkashev

19 February 2019 3	Regar-TadAZ	0–2	Istiklol	Hisor
14:00 (UTC+5)	S.Saidahmad (yellow card) -' (yellow-red card) 75'	Report	Tursunov 62' (yellow card); S.Samiyev 82'; Fatkhuloev (yellow card); Larin (yellow card); Panjshanbe (yellow card)	Stadium: Central Stadium; Referee: Behruz Murtazoev

20 February 2019 4	Istiklol	6–2	Kuktosh Rudaki	Hisor
14:00 (UTC+5)	Tursunov 20'; Zabun 23'; Fatkhuloev 25'; Rakhimov 34'; Juraboev (yellow card) -' (yellow-red card) 70'; S.Samiyev 81'; A.Dzhalilov 86'	Report	A.Sultonov 44'; A.Rakhmonov 46' (pen.) (yellow card); M.Muzaffarov (yellow card)	Stadium: Central Stadium; Attendance: 300

22 February 2019 5	Dushanbe-83	0–2	Istiklol	Hisor
14:00 (UTC+5)		Report	Fatkhuloev 15'; S.Samiyev 65'	Stadium: Central Stadium; Attendance: 200; Referee: Abdurashid Murodov

23 February 2019 6	Istiklol	5–0	Khayr Vahdat	Hisor
14:00 (UTC+5)	Panjshanbe 19'; Tursunov 30', 37'; S.Samiyev 48'; Boboev 81'; Kalandarov (yellow card)	Report	D.Rizoev (yellow card)	Stadium: Central Stadium; Referee: Gulmurodi Sadullo

=== Finals Group ===
Pos	Team	Pld	W	D	L	GF	GA	GD	Pts	Qualification
1	(Tajikistan) Istiklol	3	3	0	0	13	4	+9	9	Advance to Semi-finals
2	(Tajikistan) Kuktosh Rudaki	3	2	0	1	9	4	+5	6	Advance to Semi-finals
3	(Tajikistan) Khulbuk	2	1	0	1	9	10	−1	3	
4	(Tajikistan) Guliston	3	0	0	3	1	14	−13	0	

Updated to match(es) played on 27 February 2019. Source:

25 February 2019 1	Istiklol	5–3	Khulbuk	Hisor
14:00 (UTC+5)	Boboev 23', 29', 53'; Nazarov 37'; A.Dzhalilov 44'; Sultonov (yellow card)	Report	A.Kamchinov 13'; D.Shomadov 68'; R.Holmirzoev 83'; S.Jalilov (yellow card); H.Navruzov (yellow card)	Stadium: Central Stadium; Attendance: 100; Referee: Abdullo Davlatov

27 February 2019 2	Istiklol	2–1	Kuktosh Rudaki	Hisor
14:00 (UTC+5)	Boboev 51'; I.Dzhalilov 80'	Report	A.Rakhmonov 58'; H.Nazarov (yellow card)	Stadium: Central Stadium; Attendance: 400; Referee: Abdurashid Murodov

1 March 2019 3	Guliston	0–6	Istiklol	Hisor
14:00 (UTC+5)	J.Zoirov (yellow card); B.Imomkulov (yellow card); S.Nabiyev (yellow card)	Report	Rakhimov 13', 30'; S.Samiyev 53'; S.Giyosov 54'; M.Hakimzoda 57'; Tursunov 69'; Panjshanbe (yellow card)	Stadium: Central Stadium; Referee: Amirdzhon Horkashev

=== Knockout phase ===
3 March 2019 Semifinal	Istiklol	5–0	Dushanbe-83	Hisor
14:00 (UTC+5)	A.Dzhalilov 33'; Boboev 52'; Tursunov 59', 88'; Panjshanbe 63'; Fatkhuloev (yellow card); Rakhimov (yellow card); Cakić (yellow card); Kalandarov (yellow card)	Report	A.Kaleb (yellow card); F.Saidov (yellow card)	Stadium: Central Stadium; Attendance: 400; Referee: Sayojon Zainiddinov

5 March 2019 Final	Istiklol	5–2	Kuktosh Rudaki	Dushanbe
14:00 (UTC+5)	I.Dzhalilov 17'; A.Dzhalilov 22' (yellow card); Rakhimov 47'; Boboev 81' (yellow card); Nazarov 87'	Report	M.Muzaffarov 35'; A.Rakhmonov 64'	Stadium: Pamir Stadium; Attendance: 3,459; Referee: Nasrullo Kabirov

== Competitions ==
=== Tajik Supercup ===
29 March 2019	Istiklol	3–0	Khujand	Dushanbe
19:00 (UTC+5)	Koryan 38' (pen.), 50'; S.Samiyev 90'; Cakić (yellow card); A.Dzhalilov (yellow card); Panjshanbe (yellow card)	Report	Abdugafforov (yellow card); A.Begimkulov (yellow card); Chakalov (yellow card); Erghashev (yellow card)	Stadium: Pamir Stadium; Attendance: 7,200; Referee: Gulmurodi Sadullo

=== Tajik League ===
==== Results summary ====
Overall								Home						Away					
Pld	W	D	L	GF	GA	GD	Pts	W	D	L	GF	GA	GD	W	D	L	GF	GA	GD
21	16	3	2	60	20	+40	51	8	1	1	24	5	+19	8	2	1	36	15	+21

Last updated: 4 November 2019.
Source: See Results

==== Results by round ====
Round	1	2	3	4	5	6	7	8	9	10	11	12	13	14	15	16	17	18	19	20	21
Ground	A	H	A	H	A	H	A	H	H	H	A	H	H	A	A	H	A	H	A	H	A
Result	W	W	D	W	D	W	W	W	W	W	W	D	W	W	D	W	W	L	W	W	L
Position	1	1	1	1	1	1	1	1	1	1	1	1	1	1	1	1	1	1	1	1	1

Source: Results
A = Away; H = Home; W = Win; D = Draw; L = Loss

==== Results ====
7 April 2019 1	Regar-TadAZ	1–4	Istiklol	Vahdat
(UTC+5)	S.Makhmadiev 30'	Report	Fatkhuloev 5' (pen.), 31'; Panjshanbe 62' (pen.); Boboev 87'; Z.Juraboev (yellow card)	Stadium: Central Stadium; Attendance: 2,000; Referee: Slim Turdyev

11 April 2019 2	Istiklol	3–1	Khatlon	Dushanbe
17:00 (UTC+5)	Dzhalilov 8'; Boboev 45+1'; A.Barotov 56' (o.g.); Panjshanbe (yellow card); Davlatmir (yellow card)	Report	K.Uzoqov 63' (yellow card); M.Naskov (yellow card); R.Azizov (yellow card)	Stadium: Pamir Stadium; Referee: Abdullo Davlatov

22 April 2019 3	Kuktosh	2–2	Istiklol	Rudaki
16:30 (UTC+5)	M.Odilov 4', 10'; B.Khiriyev (yellow card); A.Safarov (yellow card); K.Nazarov (yellow card); M.Abdugafforov (yellow card); B.Shodiyev (yellow card)	Report	S.Samiyev 31' (yellow card); Fatkhuloev 88' (pen.); Z.Juraboev (yellow card); Panjshanbe (yellow card)	Stadium: Oilfield Stadium; Referee: Abdurashid Murodov

26 April 2019 4	Istiklol	4–0	Istaravshan	Dushanbe
(UTC+5)	Rakhimov 1'; Panjshanbe 57'; A.Dzhalilov 68'; S.Samiyev 72'; Boboev (yellow card); J.Kimsanov (yellow card)	Report	B.Zokirov (yellow card); T.Umarov (yellow card)	Stadium: Pamir Stadium; Attendance: 450; Referee: Behruz Murtazoev

4 May 2019 5	Panjshir	1–5	Istiklol	Kolkhozobod
(UTC+5)	S.Sharipov 75'; A.Tojiahmedov (yellow card); S.Rajamatov (yellow card); S.Abdulloev (yellow card)	Report	Rakhimov 17' (yellow card); Boboev 25'; J.Kimsanov 29'; A.Dzhalilov 33'; Nazarov 60'; Kalandarov (yellow card)	Stadium: Panjshir Uktam Mamatova; Attendance: 4,000; Referee: Abdullo Davlatov

9 May 2019 6	CSKA Pamir Dushanbe	1–4	Istiklol	Dushanbe
17:00 (UTC+5)	Hanonov 82'; S.Kosimov (yellow card)	Report	Panjshanbe 49', 89'; A.Dzhalilov 76' (pen.); Boboev 90+2'	Stadium: CSKA Stadium; Attendance: 2,000; Referee: Nekruz Umarov

19 May 2019 7	Khujand	0–3	Istiklol	Khujand
(UTC+5)	Erghashev (yellow card)	Report	A.Begimkulov 31' (o.g.); Panjshanbe 74' (yellow card); Nazarov 78'; J.Kimsanov (yellow card)	Stadium: 20 Years of Independence Stadium; Attendance: 8,000; Referee: Sayojon Zainiddinov

26 May 2019 8	Istiklol	2–1	Khujand	Dushanbe
(UTC+5)	Boboev 45'; Z.Juraboev 68'; Rakhimov (yellow card); A.Dzhalilov (yellow card)	Report	Rustamov 19'; K.Mirzonajot (yellow card); D.Karimov (yellow card)	Stadium: Pamir Stadium; Attendance: 400; Referee: Saivali Turdiyev

30 June 2019 9	Istiklol	3–0	CSKA Pamir Dushanbe	Dushanbe
18:00 (UTC+5)	A.Juraboev 28'; Boboev 44'; Samiyev 79'	Report		Stadium: Pamir Stadium; Attendance: 300; Referee: Abdurashid Murodov
Note: Match was original scheduled for 15 June.

24 July 2019 10	Istiklol	2–0	Panjshir	Dushanbe
(UTC+5)	Boboev 2'; M.Jobirov 50' (o.g.)	Report	A.Khakimov (yellow card); A.Tojiahmedov (yellow card)	Stadium: Pamir Stadium; Attendance: 300; Referee: Murod Kurbonov
Note: Match was original scheduled for 22 June.

9 August 2019 11	Istaravshan	0–1	Istiklol	Istaravshan
(UTC+5)	K.Ziyoyev (yellow card); B.Zokirov (yellow card); D.Boykuziev (yellow card); I.Barotov (yellow card); A.Kodirov (yellow card)	Report	A.Dzhalilov 45+3'	Stadium: Central Stadium; Attendance: 14,000; Referee: Abdurashid Murodov

17 August 2019 12	Istiklol	0–0	Kuktosh	Dushanbe
(UTC+5)	Rakhimov (yellow card)	Report	M.Odilov (yellow card); A.Safarov (yellow card); Hayriev (yellow card)	Stadium: Pamir Stadium; Attendance: 850; Referee: Khusravi Siddikzod

24 August 2019 13	Istiklol	5–0	Khatlon	Dushanbe
(UTC+5)	Rakhimov 14', 67'; Boboev 64', 82'; A.Dzhalilov 84'; I.Dzhalilov (yellow card)	Report	M.Nazkov (yellow card)	Stadium: Pamir Stadium; Attendance: 200; Referee: Khurshed Dadoboev

15 September 2019 14	Regar-TadAZ	2–3	Istiklol	Tursunzoda
(UTC+5)	D.Ganiev 72'; A.Bobomurodov 77'; S.Makhamadiev (yellow card); A.Zabirov (yellow card); A.Arash (yellow card)	Report	Rakhimov 33' (yellow card); A.Dzhalilov 54' (penalty missed) 86'; Tursunov 57'; Larin (yellow card)	Stadium: TALCO Arena; Attendance: 3,000; Referee: Sayedzhon Zayniddinov

18 September 2019 15	Khatlon	2–2	Istiklol	Qurghonteppa
(UTC+5)	N.Ibrahimzoda 70'; A.Boronov 90'; R.Azizov (yellow card); S.Ismoilov (yellow card)	Report	A.Dzhalilov 11'; Boboev 42'; Panjshanbe (yellow card); Tursunov (yellow card)	Stadium: Tsentralnyi Stadium; Attendance: 3,000; Referee: Abdurashid Murodov

22 September 2019 16	Istiklol	2–0	Istaravshan	Dushanbe
(UTC+5)	Boboev 57' (yellow card); Nazarov 78' (pen.)	Report	T.Umarov (yellow card)	Stadium: Pamir Stadium; Attendance: 1,000; Referee: Nekruz Umarov

27 September 2019 17	Kuktosh	1–6	Istiklol	Rudaki
(UTC+5)	Karimov 71'; M.Odilov (yellow card)	Report	A.Dzhalilov 27', 73'; Boboev 40', 61', 87'; Panjshanbe 46'	Stadium: Oilfield Stadium; Attendance: 3,000; Referee: Khurshed Dadaboev

5 October 2019 18	Istiklol	1–2	Regar-TadAZ	Hisor
(UTC+5)	Nazarov 72' (pen.)	Report	D.Ganiev 27'; S.Makhmadiev 61' (pen.); R.Paizov (yellow card)	Stadium: Central Stadium; Attendance: 500; Referee: Farrukhi Huseynzoda

20 October 2019 19	Panjshir	2–4	Istiklol	Kolkhozobod
15:00 (UTC+5)	A.Memari 49', 63'; K.Turmakhonov (yellow card); M.Dzhobirov (yellow card); J.Yusupov (yellow card)	Report	Rakhimov 2', 55' (yellow card); Boboev 23'; Samiyev 25'	Stadium: Panjshir Uktam Mamatova; Attendance: 1,5000; Referee: Abdullo Davlatov

27 October 2019 20	Istiklol	2–1	Khujand	Dushanbe
16:00 (UTC+5)	Panjshanbe 4'; A.Dzhalilov 54'	Report	Rakhimov 90+1' (o.g.); Choriyev (yellow card); K.Mirzonajot (yellow card); D. Bozorov (yellow card); Rustamov (yellow card)	Stadium: Pamir Stadium; Attendance: 700; Referee: Behruz Murtazoev

4 November 2019 21	CSKA Pamir Dushanbe	3–2	Istiklol	Dushanbe
14:30 (UTC+5)	S.Mabatshoev 5', 85'; S.Gafforov 11'; B.Sulaimonov (yellow card)	Report	M.Khakimzoda 73' (yellow card); Boboev 90+1'	Stadium: CSKA Stadium; Attendance: 300; Referee: Sayedzhon Zainiddinov

==== League table ====
Pos	Team	Pld	W	D	L	GF	GA	GD	Pts	Qualification or relegation
1	Istiklol (C)	21	16	3	2	60	20	+40	51	Qualification for AFC Champions League preliminary round 2 (Note: If the league champions cannot qualify for the AFC Champions League group stage, they will enter the AFC Cup group stage.)
2	Khujand	21	11	3	7	37	21	+16	36	Qualification for AFC Cup play-off round (Note: Since league champions Istiklol were also Tajikistan Cup winners, the league runners-up qualified for the AFC Cup play-off round.)
3	Regar-TadAZ	21	8	6	7	31	30	+1	30	
4	CSKA Pamir	21	8	5	8	24	27	−3	29	
5	Istaravshan	21	8	3	10	24	32	−8	27 (Note: Head-to-head results: Istaravshan 0–0 Kuktosh, Kuktosh 3–1 Istaravshan, Istaravshan 3–0 Kuktosh.)	

Source: FFT
Rules for classification: 1) Points; 2) Head-to-head points; 3) Head-to-head goal difference; 4) Head-to-head goals scored; 5) Goal difference; 6) Goals scored.
(C) Champions

=== Tajik Cup ===
2 August 2019 Last 16 1st leg	Istiklol	7–2	Barkchi	Hisor
19:00 (UTC+5)	Samiyev 33', 74'; U.Ramazonov 45+2' (o.g.); A.Dzhalilov 58' (pen.); Sulaimonov (penalty missed) 61' 61', 69'; Boboev 90+1'; Rakhimov (yellow card)	Report	T.Maladustov 71', 81' (pen.); Z.Fuzaylov (yellow card)	Stadium: Central Stadium; Attendance: 500; Referee: Nasrullo Kabirov

5 August 2019 Last 16 2nd leg	Barkchi	1–7 (3–14 agg.)	Istiklol	Dushanbe
(UTC+5)	T.Maladustov 17'; R.Davlatov (yellow card); F.Nazarov (yellow card)	Report	Panjshanbe 1', 41' (yellow card); Samiyev 14', 26'; Larin 52'; Boboev 71'; S.Ashurmamadov 85'	Stadium: Pamir Stadium; Attendance: 100; Referee: Abdullo Davlatov

21 August 2019 Quarterfinal 1st leg	Eskhata Khujand	1–2	Istiklol	Khujand
(UTC+5)	I.Eshonkhonov 74'; U.Odinaev (yellow card); B.Juraev (yellow card)	Report	I.Rakhmatov 5' (o.g.); Samiyev 47'; Yatimov (yellow card)	Stadium: Spartak Stadium; Attendance: 1,500; Referee: Gulmurodi Sadullo

27 August 2019 Quarterfinal 2nd leg	Istiklol	6–0 (8–1 agg.)	Eskhata Khujand	Dushanbe
(UTC+5)	Nazarov 31'; A.Dzhalilov 33'; Boboev 50', 58'; I.Dzhalilov 76'; M.Khakimzoda 84'	Report		Stadium: Pamir Stadium; Attendance: 150; Referee: Sayedzhon Zayniddinov

1 October 2019 Semifinal 1st leg	Istiklol	5–0	Hulbuk	Hisor
16:00 (UTC+5)	Rakhimov 25', 37', 70', 90+2'; I.Dzhalilov 85'	Report	Z.Habibullo (yellow card)	Stadium: Central Stadium; Attendance: 500; Referee: Abdurashid Murodov

1 November 2019 Semifinal 2nd leg	Hulbuk	1–1 (1–6 agg.)	Istiklol	Vose
14:00 (UTC+5)	N.Makhmadkulov 39'; S.Rakhmonov (yellow card)	Report	K.Dzhuraev (red card) 53'; Tursunov 82' (yellow card); Davlatmir (yellow card); Samiyev (yellow card)	Stadium: Central Stadium; Attendance: 3,000; Referee: Nekruz Umarov

==== Final ====
24 November 2019 Final	Istiklol	1–1 (a.e.t.) (4–2 p)	Regar-TadAZ	Hisor
14:00 (UTC+5)	Tursunov 12'; Panjshanbe (penalty missed) 66'; I.Dzhalilov (yellow card); Sulaimonov (yellow card); Rakhimov (yellow card)	Report	Babadjanov 32' (pen.)	Stadium: Central Stadium; Referee: Nasrullo Kabirov
	Penalties
	Z.Juraboev (penalty missed); I.Dzhalilov (penalty scored); Sulaimonov (penalty scored); Larin (penalty scored); Panjshanbe (penalty scored)		(penalty missed) A.Zabirov; (penalty scored) Zardiev; (penalty missed) S.Makhmadiev; (penalty scored) A.Sharipov

=== AFC Champions League ===
==== Qualifying stage ====
12 February 2019 Preliminary round 2	AGMK (Uzbekistan)	4–2	(Tajikistan) Istiklol	Olmaliq, Uzbekistan
16:00 (UTC+5)	Juraev 25'; S.Rakhmatov (yellow card) 47'; S.Shikhov (yellow card) 73'; J.Khakimov 78'; Z.Polvonov 82'	Report	Rakhimov 2'; Cakić (yellow card) 21'; Larin (yellow card) 55'; J.Kimsanov 62'	Stadium: AGMK Stadium; Referee: Jarred Gillett (Australia)

=== AFC Cup ===
==== Group stage ====
Pos	Team	Pld	W	D	L	GF	GA	GD	Pts	Qualification
1	(Turkmenistan) Altyn Asyr	6	2	4	0	7	4	+3	10	Inter-zone play-off semi-finals
2	(Tajikistan) Istiklol	6	2	2	2	12	8	+4	8	
3	(Kyrgyzstan) Dordoi	6	2	1	3	9	12	−3	7 (Note: Head-to-head results: Khujand 3–1 Dordoi, Dordoi 3–0 Khujand.)	
4	(Tajikistan) Khujand	6	2	1	3	6	10	−4	7	

Source: AFC
Rules for classification: Group stage tiebreakers
Notes:

3 April 2019 1	Istiklol (Tajikistan)	3–0	(Tajikistan) Khujand	Dushanbe, Tajikistan
19:00 (UTC+5)	Koryan 50', 71'; A.Dzhalilov 68' (pen.)	Report	Erghashev (yellow card) 45+2'	Stadium: Pamir Stadium; Attendance: 12,800; Referee: Nivon Robesh Gamini (Sri Lanka)

17 April 2019 2	Altyn Asyr (Turkmenistan)	1–1	(Tajikistan) Istiklol	Ashgabat, Turkmenistan
17:00 (UTC+5)	S.Nurmuradov 80'	Report	A.Juraboev (yellow card) 45+1'; Boboev 79'; I.Dzhalilov (yellow card) 90+2'	Stadium: Köpetdag Stadium; Attendance: 11,300; Referee: Abdulla Al-Marri (Qatar)

1 May 2019 3	Istiklol (Tajikistan)	4–1	(Kyrgyzstan) Dordoi Bishkek	Dushanbe, Tajikistan
19:00 (UTC+5)	A.Dzhalilov 15' (pen.); Fatkhuloev 43' (pen.); Cakić 49'; S.Samiyev 81'	Report	A.Sakenov (yellow card) 2'; Iusupov (yellow card) 45+1'; Murzaev 50'; Musabekov (yellow card) 59'; Akhmedov (yellow card) 70'	Stadium: Pamir Stadium; Attendance: 13,200; Referee: Mohammad Arafah (Jordan)

15 May 2019 4	Dordoi Bishkek (Kyrgyzstan)	2–1	(Tajikistan) Istiklol	Bishkek, Kyrgyzstan
19:00 (UTC+5)	Shamshiev (yellow card) 33'; Orazsähedow 57'; Murzaev 77'	Report	A.Dzhalilov 29'; Nazarov (yellow card) 58'; Cakić (yellow card) 62'	Stadium: Dolen Omurzakov Stadium; Attendance: 4,435; Referee: Ali Reda (Lebanon)

19 June 2019 5	Khujand (Tajikistan)	3–2	(Tajikistan) Istiklol	Khujand, Tajikistan
17:00 (UTC+5)	Ergashev 4'; Choriyev (yellow card) 38'; Rustamov 40'; Vasiev 72'	Report	Cakić (yellow card) 25'; J.Kimsanov 30'; Panjshanbe 64'	Stadium: 20 Years of Independence Stadium; Attendance: 6,850; Referee: Ali Shaban (Kuwait)

26 June 2019 6	Istiklol (Tajikistan)	1–1	(Turkmenistan) Altyn Asyr	Dushanbe, Tajikistan
19:00 (UTC+5)	A.Dzhalilov (yellow card) 2'; Fatkhuloev (yellow card) 42' (goal) 57'; J.Kimsanov (yellow card) 88'	Report	Annadurdyýew 49'; Babajanow (yellow card) 68'; Saparow (yellow card) 68'; B.Akmamedov (yellow card) 88'; Orazmuhammedow (yellow card) 90+5'	Stadium: Pamir Stadium; Attendance: 14,000; Referee: Sultan Al-Marzooqi (United Arab Emirates)

== Squad statistics ==
As of match played 24 November 2019

=== Appearances and goals ===
No.	Pos	Nat	Player	Total		Tajik League		Tajik Cup		Super Cup		AFC Champions League		AFC Cup	
No.	Pos	Nat	Player	Apps	Goals	Apps	Goals	Apps	Goals	Apps	Goals	Apps	Goals	Apps	Goals
1	GK	(Tajikistan) TJK	Rustam Yatimov	21	0	14+1	0	6	0	0	0	0	0	0	0
3	DF	(Tajikistan) TJK	Tabrezi Davlatmir	25	0	15+3	0	7	0	0	0	0	0	0	0
4	DF	(Tajikistan) TJK	Shakhzod Davlatov	7	0	2+2	0	1+2	0	0	0	0	0	0	0
5	DF	(Tajikistan) TJK	Iskandar Dzhalilov	28	2	16	0	4	2	1	0	1	0	6	0
6	DF	(Tajikistan) TJK	Zoir Juraboev	25	1	17+1	1	6+1	0	0	0	0	0	0	0
7	DF	(Russia) RUS	Dzhamshed Rakhmonov	12	0	6	0	6	0	0	0	0	0	0	0
9	MF	(Tajikistan) TJK	Khurshed-Timur Dzhuraev	10	0	2+4	0	2+2	0	0	0	0	0	0	0
10	MF	(Tajikistan) TJK	Alisher Dzhalilov	27	16	13+2	11	4	2	1	0	1	0	6	3
11	MF	(Tajikistan) TJK	Muhammadjon Rakhimov	31	12	17+1	7	5	4	0+1	0	1	1	4+2	0
14	FW	(Tajikistan) TJK	Sheriddin Boboev	32	21	19+2	16	4+2	4	0	0	0	0	2+3	1
17	MF	(Tajikistan) TJK	Ehson Panjshanbe	32	10	16+2	7	6	2	0+1	0	1	0	5+1	1
18	MF	(Tajikistan) TJK	Saidmuxtor Azimov	9	0	1+3	0	3+2	0	0	0	0	0	0	0
19	DF	(Tajikistan) TJK	Akhtam Nazarov	28	5	17	4	3	1	1	0	1	0	6	0
20	MF	(Tajikistan) TJK	Salam Ashurmamadov	5	1	2	0	0+3	1	0	0	0	0	0	0
21	DF	(Ukraine) UKR	Oleksiy Larin	28	1	13+1	0	5+1	1	1	0	1	0	6	0
22	GK	(Serbia) SRB	Nikola Stošić	17	0	7	0	1+1	0	1	0	1	0	6	0
23	FW	(Tajikistan) TJK	Shahrom Samiyev	29	11	8+10	4	6	5	0+1	1	0	0	1+3	1
28	FW	(Tajikistan) TJK	Komron Tursunov	24	3	13+2	1	3	2	1	0	0+1	0	1+3	0
30	FW	(Tajikistan) TJK	Mukhammad Khakimzoda	5	2	1+1	1	0+3	1	0	0	0	0	0	0
40	DF	(Tajikistan) TJK	Sorbon Giyosov	2	0	0+1	0	1	0	0	0	0	0	0	0
70	MF	(Tajikistan) TJK	Shakhrom Sulaimonov	22	2	7+9	0	5	2	0	0	0	0	1	0
Youth team players:
Players away from Istiklol on loan:
Players who left Istiklol during the season:
2	DF	(Uzbekistan) UZB	Jalil Kimsanov	14	3	5+1	1	0	0	1	0	0+1	1	6	1
4	DF	(Tajikistan) TJK	Bakhtior Kalandarov	8	0	6	0	0	0	0+1	0	1	0	0	0
7	MF	(Serbia) SRB	Mihajlo Cakić	8	1	1	0	0	0	1	0	1	0	4+1	1
8	MF	(Tajikistan) TJK	Nuriddin Davronov	4	0	1+1	0	0	0	0	0	0	0	1+1	0
9	FW	(Armenia) ARM	Ruslan Koryan	5	4	1	0	0	0	1	2	0	0	3	2
13	MF	(Tajikistan) TJK	Nozim Babadjanov	1	0	0	0	0	0	0	0	0+1	0	0	0
18	MF	(Tajikistan) TJK	Fatkhullo Fatkhuloev	14	5	5+1	3	0	0	1	0	1	0	6	2
20	MF	(Tajikistan) TJK	Amirbek Juraboev	16	1	6+3	1	0	0	1	0	1	0	2+3	0

=== Goal scorers ===
Place	Position	Nation	Number	Name	Tajik League	Tajik Cup	Super Cup	AFC Champions League	AFC Cup	Total
1	FW	(Tajikistan)	14	Sheriddin Boboev	16	4	0	0	1	21
2	MF	(Tajikistan)	10	Alisher Dzhalilov	11	2	0	0	3	16
3	MF	(Tajikistan)	11	Muhammadjon Rakhimov	7	4	0	1	0	12
4	FW	(Tajikistan)	23	Shahrom Samiyev	4	5	1	0	1	11
5	MF	(Tajikistan)	17	Ehson Panjshanbe	7	2	0	0	1	10
6	DF	(Tajikistan)	19	Akhtam Nazarov	4	1	0	0	0	5
6	MF	(Tajikistan)	18	Fatkhullo Fatkhuloev	3	0	0	0	2	5
6				Own goal	3	2	0	0	0	5
9	FW	(Armenia)	9	Ruslan Koryan	0	0	2	0	2	4
10	FW	(Tajikistan)	28	Komron Tursunov	1	2	0	0	0	3
10	DF	(Uzbekistan)	2	Jalil Kimsanov	1	0	0	1	1	3
12	FW	(Tajikistan)	30	Mukhammad Khakimzoda	1	1	0	0	0	2
12	MF	(Tajikistan)	70	Shakhrom Sulaimonov	0	2	0	0	0	2
12	DF	(Tajikistan)	5	Iskandar Dzhalilov	0	2	0	0	0	2
15	DF	(Tajikistan)	6	Zoir Juraboev	1	0	0	0	0	1
15	MF	(Tajikistan)	20	Amirbek Juraboev	1	0	0	0	0	1
15	DF	(Ukraine)	21	Oleksiy Larin	0	1	0	0	0	1
15	MF	(Tajikistan)	20	Salam Ashurmamadov	0	1	0	0	0	1
15	MF	(Serbia)	7	Mihajlo Cakić	0	0	0	0	1	1
				TOTALS	60	29	3	2	12	106

=== Disciplinary record ===
Number	Nation	Position	Name	Tajik League		Tajik Cup		Super Cup		AFC Champions League		AFC Cup		Total	
Number	Nation	Position	Name	Booked	Sent off (straight red)	Booked	Sent off (straight red)	Booked	Sent off (straight red)	Booked	Sent off (straight red)	Booked	Sent off (straight red)	Booked	Sent off (straight red)
1	(Tajikistan)	GK	Rustam Yatimov	0	0	1	0	0	0	0	0	0	0	1	0
3	(Tajikistan)	DF	Tabrezi Davlatmir	1	0	1	0	0	0	0	0	0	0	2	0
4	(Tajikistan)	DF	Bakhtior Kalandarov	1	0	0	0	0	0	0	0	0	0	1	0
5	(Tajikistan)	DF	Iskandar Dzhalilov	0	0	1	0	0	0	0	0	1	0	2	0
6	(Tajikistan)	DF	Zoir Juraboev	2	0	0	0	0	0	0	0	0	0	2	0
9	(Tajikistan)	MF	Khurshed-Timur Dzhuraev	0	0	0	1	0	0	0	0	0	0	0	1
10	(Tajikistan)	MF	Alisher Dzhalilov	1	0	0	0	1	0	0	0	1	0	3	0
11	(Tajikistan)	MF	Muhammadjon Rakhimov	5	0	2	0	0	0	0	0	0	0	7	0
14	(Tajikistan)	FW	Sheriddin Boboev	2	0	0	0	0	0	0	0	0	0	2	0
17	(Tajikistan)	MF	Ehson Panjshanbe	4	0	1	0	1	0	0	0	0	0	6	0
19	(Tajikistan)	DF	Akhtam Nazarov	0	0	0	0	0	0	0	0	1	0	1	0
21	(Ukraine)	DF	Oleksiy Larin	1	0	0	0	0	0	1	0	0	0	2	0
23	(Tajikistan)	FW	Shahrom Samiyev	1	0	1	0	0	0	0	0	0	0	2	0
28	(Tajikistan)	FW	Komron Tursunov	1	0	1	0	0	0	0	0	0	0	2	0
30	(Tajikistan)	FW	Mukhammad Khakimzoda	1	0	0	0	0	0	0	0	0	0	1	0
70	(Tajikistan)	MF	Shakhrom Sulaimonov	0	0	1	0	0	0	0	0	0	0	1	0
Players who left Istiklol during the season:
2	(Uzbekistan)	DF	Jalil Kimsanov	2	0	0	0	0	0	0	0	1	0	3	0
7	(Serbia)	MF	Mihajlo Cakić	0	0	0	0	1	0	1	0	2	0	4	0
18	(Tajikistan)	MF	Fatkhullo Fatkhuloev	0	0	0	0	0	0	0	0	1	0	1	0
20	(Tajikistan)	MF	Amirbek Juraboev	0	0	0	0	0	0	0	0	1	0	1	0
			TOTALS	22	0	9	1	3	0	2	0	8	0	44	1
