= 2019 Tajikistan Cup =

Tournament details
- Country: Tajikistan

The 2019 Tajikistan Cup is the 28th edition of the Tajikistan Cup, the knockout football tournament of Tajikistan. The cup winner qualifies for the 2020 AFC Cup.

== Qualifying round ==
The draw of the qualifying and preliminary rounds was held on 7 May 2019. The matches were played between 8 and 25 May 2019.

=== Dushanbe and Rasht zones ===
==== First qualifying round ====
8 May: “Rasht” (Rasht) - “Mehrgon” (Nurabad) - 4: 1

==== Second qualifying round ====
11 May (first leg): “Orzu” (Shahrinav) - “Rasht” (Rasht) - 6: 0

15 May (second leg): “Rasht” (Rasht) - “Orzu” (Shahrinav) - 2: 0

==== Third qualifying round ====
19 May (first leg): “Orzu” (Shakhrinav) - “Zarafshon” (Penjikent) - 0: 1

25 May (second leg): “Zarafshon” (Penjikent) - “Orzu” (Shahrinav) - 3: 1

=== Khatlon zone ===
==== First qualifying round ====
8 May (first leg): Kushoniyon (Kushoniyon) - Mohir (Yavan) - 0: 1

11 May (second leg): “Mohir” (Yavan) - “Kushoniyon” (Kushoniyon) - 6: 3

== Preliminary round ==
The first legs were played on 26–28 May 2019, and the second legs were played on 8–9 and 18 June 2019.

26 May (first leg): “Ravshan” (Kulyab) - “Dusti” (Jaihun) - 1: 3

26 May (first leg): “Isfara” (Isfara) - “Ravshan” (Zafarabad) - 2: 0

27 May (first leg): “Barkchi” (Hissar) - “Shohmansur” (Dushanbe) - 4: 1

27 May (first leg): Vahdat (Vahdat) - Lokomotiv-Pamir (Dushanbe) - 0: 0

27 May (first leg): “Khulbuk” (Vose) - “Faizkand” (Vose) - 3: 2

27 May (first leg): “Saroykamar” (Pyanj) - “Mohir” (Yavan) - 5: 2

27 May (first leg): “Eskhata” (Khujand) - “Parvoz” (Khujand International Airport) - 0: 1

28 May (first leg): Dushanbe-83 (Dushanbe) - Zarafshon (Penjikent) - 3: 0 (awd.)

8 June (second leg): “Shohmansur” (Dushanbe) - “Barkchi” (Gissar) - 0: 6

8 June (second leg): “Faizkand” (Vose) - “Khulbuk” (Vose) - 0: 0

8 June (second leg): “Parvoz” (Khujand International Airport) - “Eskhata” (Khujand) - 1: 2

9 June (second leg): “Dusti” (Jaihun) - “Ravshan” (Kulyab) - 2: 1

9 June (second leg): “Mohir” (Yavan) - “Saroykamar” (Pyanj) - 1: 3

9 June (second leg): Ravshan (Zafarabad) - Isfara (Isfara) - 0: 0

18 June (second leg): “Lokomotiv-Pamir” (Dushanbe) - “Vahdat” (Vahdat) - 0: 1

Not played (second leg): Zarafshon (Penjikent) - Dushanbe-83 (Dushanbe) - 0: 3 (awd.)

== Round of 16 ==
The draw for the round of 16 onwards was held on 12 July 2019. Teams from the Tajikistan Higher League entered at this stage. The first legs were played on 30–31 July and 2 August 2019, and the second legs were played on 3–6 August 2019.

30 July (first leg): “Saroykamar” (Pyanj) - “Khatlon” (Bokhtar) - 0: 1

30 July (first leg): “Khujand” (Khujand) - “Vahdat” (Vahdat) - 7: 0

30 July (first leg): "Dushanbe-83" (Dushanbe) - CSKA "Pamir" (Dushanbe) - 1: 1

31 July (first leg): Regar-TadAZ (Tursunzade) - Kuktosh (Rudaki) - 0: 0

31 July (first leg): “Eskhata” (Khujand) - “Isfara” (Isfara) - 4: 2

31 July (first leg): “Istaravshan” (Istaravshan) - “Khulbuk” (Vose) - 1: 0

31 July (first leg): “Dusti” (Jaihun) - “Panjsher” (Jaloliddin Balkhi) - 1: 1

2 August (first leg): Istiklol (Dushanbe) - Barkchi (Gissar) - 7: 2

3 August (second leg): “Khatlon” (Bokhtar) - “Saroykamar” (Pyanj) - 5: 1 (agg 6: 1)

3 August (second leg): CSKA Pamir (Dushanbe) - Dushanbe-83 (Dushanbe) - 0: 0 (agg 1: 1, CSKA Pamir won on away goals)

3 August (second leg): “Isfara” (Isfara) - “Eskhata” (Khujand) - 3: 3 (agg 5: 7)

4 August (second leg): “Kuktosh” (Rudaki) - “Regar-TadAZ” (Tursunzade) - 2: 2 (agg 2: 2, Regar-TadAZ won on away goals)

4 August (second leg): “Khulbuk” (Vose) - “Istaravshan” (Istaravshan) - 3: 1 (agg 3: 2)

4 August (second leg): Panjshir (Jaloliddin Balkhi) - Dusti (Jaihun) - 0: 1 (agg 1: 2)

5 August (second leg): Barkchi (Gissar) - Istiklol (Dushanbe) - 1: 7 (agg 3: 14)

6 August (second leg): “Vahdat” (Vahdat) - “Khujand” (Khujand) - 0: 5 (agg 0: 12)

== Quarter-finals ==
The first legs were played on 21 August 2019, and the second legs were played on 27 August 2019.

21 August (first leg): “Khatlon” - “Khujand” - 0: 2

21 August (first leg): “Eskhata” - “Istiklol” - 1: 2

21 August (first leg): CSKA Pamir - Regar-TadAZ - 1: 1

21 August (first leg): “Hulbuk” - “Dusti” - 2: 1

27 August (second leg): “Khujand” - “Khatlon” - 1: 0 (agg 3: 0)

27 August (second leg): "Regar-TadAZ" - CSKA "Pamir" - 2: 1 (agg 3: 2)

27 August (second leg): “Dusti” - “Hulbuk” - 2: 2 (agg 3: 4)

27 August (second leg): “Istiklol” - “Eskhata” - 6: 0 (agg 8: 1)

== Semi-finals ==
The first legs were played on 1 October 2019, and the second legs were played on 1 November 2019.

=== First leg ===
| 1 October 2019 Semifinal 1st leg | Istiklol | 5 – 0 | Hulbuk | Hisor |
| 16:00 (UTC+5) | Rakhimov 25', 37', 70', 90+2'; I.Dzhalilov 85' | Report | Z.Habibullo (yellow card) | Stadium: Central Stadium; Attendance: 500; Referee: Abdurashid Murodov |

| 1 October 2019 Semifinal 1st leg | Khujand | 1 – 1 | Regar-TadAZ | Khujand |
| (UTC+5) | | | | Stadium: 20 Years of Independence Stadium |

=== Second leg ===
| 1 November 2019 Semifinal 2nd leg | Hulbuk | 1 – 1 (1 – 6 agg.) | Istiklol | Vose |
| 14:00 (UTC+5) | N.Makhmadkulov 39'; S.Rakhmonov (yellow card) | Report | K.Dzhuraev (red card) 53'; Tursunov 82' (yellow card); Davlatmir (yellow card); Samiyev (yellow card) | Stadium: Central Stadium; Attendance: 3,000; Referee: Nekruz Umarov |

| 1 November 2019 Semifinal 2nd leg | Regar-TadAZ | 1 – 1 (2 – 2 agg.) (4 – 3 p) | Khujand | Tursunzoda |
| (UTC+5) | | | | Stadium: TALCO Arena |

== Final ==
The final was played on 24 November 2019.

| 24 November 2019 Final | Istiklol | 1 – 1 (a.e.t.) (4 – 2 p) | Regar-TadAZ | Hisor |
| 14:00 (UTC+5) | Tursunov 12'; Panjshanbe (penalty missed) 66'; I.Dzhalilov (yellow card); Sulaimonov (yellow card); Rakhimov (yellow card) | Report | Babadjanov 32' (pen.) | Stadium: Central Stadium; Referee: Nasrullo Kabirov |
| | Penalties |
| | Z.Juraboev (penalty missed); I.Dzhalilov (penalty scored); Sulaimonov (penalty scored); Larin (penalty scored); Panjshanbe (penalty scored) | | (penalty missed) A.Zabirov; (penalty scored) Zardiev; (penalty missed) S.Makhmadiev; (penalty scored) A.Sharipov |

== See also ==
- 2019 Tajikistan Higher League
