= Oleksiy Larin =

Ukrainian footballer

Personal information
- Full name: Oleksiy Andriyovych Larin
- Date of birth: 4 June 1994 (age 32)
- Place of birth: Dnipropetrovsk, Ukraine
- Height: 1.85 m (6 ft 1 in)
- Position: Centre back

Youth career
- 2006–2011: Youth Sportive School №12

Senior career*
Years	Team	Apps	(Gls)
2011–2016	Dnipro-2 Dnipropetrovsk	22	(1)
2017–2018	Dunav Ruse	26	(1)
2018	Arsenal Kyiv	0	(0)
2019–2021	Istiklol	58	(2)
2022	Pakhtakor Tashkent	8	(0)
2022–2023	Neftchi Fergana	28	(3)
2024	Istiklol	11	(0)

International career
2011	Ukraine U17	2	(0)
- * Club domestic league appearances and goals as of 22:29, 21 January 2025 (UTC)

Oleksiy Larin (Ukrainian: Олексій Андрійович Ларін; born 4 June 1994) is a Ukrainian footballer who plays as a defender, most recently for Istiklol.

== Career ==
=== Dunav Ruse ===
Larin went on trial with Bulgarian club Dunav Ruse during January 2017 and signed a 1 1/2-year contract on 7 February. He made his debut in the Bulgarian First League on 24 February 2017 against Botev Plovdiv. He scored his first goal for the team on 2 April 2017 in a match against Slavia Sofia.

=== Pakhtakor Tashkent ===
On 10 February 2022, Larin signed for Uzbekistan Super League champions Pakhtakor Tashkent.

=== Istiklol ===
On 16 March 2024, Istiklol announced the return of Larin on a contract until the end of the season. On 21 January 2025, Istiklol announced that Larin had left the club after his contract wasn't renewed.

== Career statistics ==
=== Club ===
As of match played 11 December 2024

Club	Season	League			National Cup		Continental		Other		Total	
Club	Season	Division	Apps	Goals	Apps	Goals	Apps	Goals	Apps	Goals	Apps	Goals
Dnipro-2 Dnipropetrovsk	2011–12	Ukrainian Second League	22	1	–		–		–		22	1
Dnipro-2 Dnipropetrovsk	Total		22	1	–		–		–		22	1
Dunav Ruse	2016–17	First League	10	1	1	0	-		-		11	1
Dunav Ruse	2017–18	First League	16	0	1	0	-		-		17	0
Dunav Ruse	Total		26	1	2	0	-	-	-	-	28	1
Arsenal Kyiv	2018–19	Ukrainian Premier League	0	0	0	0	-		-		0	0
Istiklol	2019	Tajikistan Higher League	14	0	6	1	7 (Note: One appearance in the AFC Champions League, and six appearances in the AFC Cup.)	0	1	0	28	1
Istiklol	2020	Tajikistan Higher League	17	1	2	0	3 (Note: Two appearance in the AFC Champions League, and one appearances in the AFC Cup.)	0	1	0	23	1
Istiklol	2021	Tajikistan Higher League	26	1	4	1	7 (Note: Appearances and goals in the AFC Champions League)	0	1	0	38	2
Istiklol	Total		57	2	12	2	17	0	3	0	89	4
Pakhtakor	2022	Uzbekistan Super League	8	0	0	0	4	0	1	0	13	0
Neftchi Fergana	2022	Uzbekistan Super League	13	1	0	0	0	0	-		13	1
Neftchi Fergana	2023	Uzbekistan Super League	15	2	2	0	0	0	-		17	2
Neftchi Fergana	Total		28	3	2	0	0	0	-	-	30	3
Istiklol	2024	Tajikistan Higher League	11	0	5	0	6 (Note: Appearances and goals in the AFC Champions League Two)	0	0	0	22	0
Career total			152	7	21	2	27	0	4	0	204	9

== Honours ==
=== Club ===
Istiklol

- Tajik League (4): 2019, 2020, 2021. 2024
- Tajik Cup (1): 2019
- Tajik Supercup (3): 2019, 2020, 2021

Pakhtakor Tashkent

- Uzbekistan Super Cup: 2022
