= Ruslan Koryan =

Armenian professional footballer (born 1988)

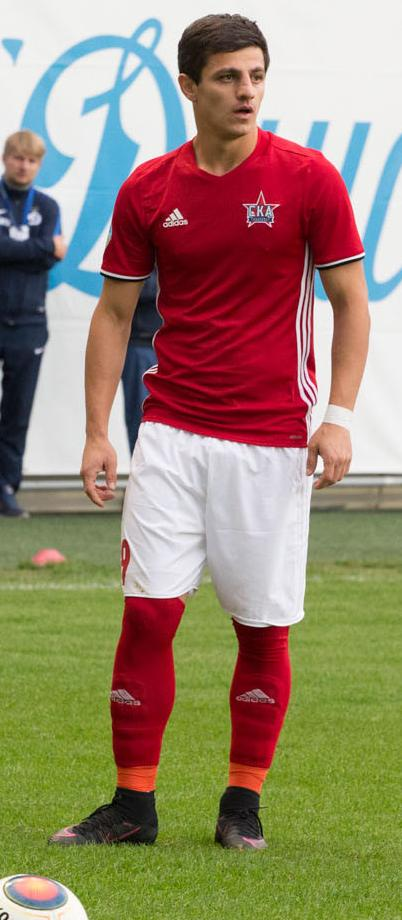
- Koryan with SKA-Khabarovsk in 2016

Personal information
- Date of birth: 15 June 1988 (age 38)
- Place of birth: Sochi, RSFSR
- Height: 1.82 m (6 ft 0 in)
- Positions: Forward; attacking midfielder

Youth career
- 2004–2005: UOR-Olimpik Donetsk

Senior career*
Years	Team	Apps	(Gls)
2005–2006	Olimpik Donetsk	4	(0)
2006–2008	Dynamo-3 Kyiv	16	(2)
2008–2009	Sochi-04	27	(4)
2009	Senec		
2010–2011	Mordovia Saransk	10	(1)
2012	SKA Rostov-on-Don	8	(3)
2012–2014	Luch-Energiya Vladivostok	47	(14)
2015	Lokomotiv Tashkent	10	(2)
2015	Luch-Energiya Vladivostok	10	(3)
2016–2018	SKA-Khabarovsk	44	(12)
2018	Pyunik	5	(1)
2019	Istiklol	1	(0)
2019–2020	Fakel Voronezh	15	(2)
2020	Kyzylzhar	8	(0)
Total		207	(44)

International career
2015–2017	Armenia	14	(3)
- * Club domestic league appearances and goals

Ruslan Koryan (Armenian: Ռուսլան Կորյան, Russian: Руслан Грачевич Корян; born 15 June 1988) is an Armenian former professional footballer who played as either a striker or attacking midfielder.

== Career ==
=== Club ===
He is alumnus of a specialized school of olympic reserve after Sergey Bubka in Donetsk. In 2005, he signed his first contract with Olimpik Donetsk. Koryan played 2006–2007 for Dynamo-3 Kyiv. In February 2015 he moved to Lokomotiv Tashkent.

On 8 March 2015, he scored his first official goal for Lokomotiv in Supercup match against Pakhtakor on 55 minute by penalty, ended with scoreline 4:0.

On 2 July 2019, Koryan left FC Istiklol by mutual consent.

On 9 September 2020, Koryan signed for FC Kyzylzhar.

=== International ===
He was called up in Armenia national team for the first time on 9 March 2015 for UEFA Euro 2016 qualifying match against Albania. He played his debut match on 9 March 2015 against Albania as substitute for Artur Yedigaryan on 84 minute.

== Personal life ==
Koryan is the cousin of the Russian youth international Arshak Koryan.

== Career statistics ==
=== Club ===
As of match played 13 November 2019

Club	Season	League			Cup		Continental		Other		Total	
Club	Season	Division	Apps	Goals	Apps	Goals	Apps	Goals	Apps	Goals	Apps	Goals
Olimpik Donetsk	2005–06	Ukrainian Second League	4	0	0	0	–		–		4	0
Dynamo-3 Kyiv	2006–07	Ukrainian Second League	16	2	0	0	–		–		16	2
Sochi-04	2008	PFL	27	4	1	0	–		–		28	4
DAC Dunajská Streda	2008–09	Slovak Super Liga	2	0	0	0	–		–		2	0
Mordovia Saransk	2010	FNL	10	1	1	0	–		–		11	1
SKA Rostov-on-Don	2011–12	PFL	8	3	–		–		–		8	3
Luch-Energiya Vladivostok	2012–13	PFL	21	6	1	0	–		–		22	6
Luch-Energiya Vladivostok	2013–14	FNL	9	2	4	1	–		–		13	3
Luch-Energiya Vladivostok	2014–15	FNL	17	6	1	0	–		–		18	6
Lokomotiv Tashkent	2015	Uzbekistan Super League	10	2	0	0	5	1	1 (Note: One appearance in the Uzbekistan Super Cup)	1	16	4
Luch-Energiya Vladivostok	2015–16	FNL	10	3	0	0	–		–		10	3
Luch-Energiya Vladivostok	Total (2 spells)		57	17	6	1	0	0	0	0	63	18
SKA-Khabarovsk	2015–16	FNL	0	0	–		–		–		0	0
SKA-Khabarovsk	2016–17	FNL	32	12	0	0	–		1 (Note: One appearance in promotion play-offs)	0	33	12
SKA-Khabarovsk	2017–18	Russian Premier League	12	0	2	0	–		–		14	0
SKA-Khabarovsk	Total		44	12	2	0	0	0	1	0	47	12
Pyunik	2018–19	Armenian Premier League	5	1	0	0	6	1	–		11	2
Istiklol	2019	Tajik League	1	0	0	0	3	2	1	2	5	4
Fakel Voronezh	2019–20	FNL	15	2	2	0	–		–		17	2
Kyzylzhar	2020	Kazakhstan Premier League	8	0	0	0	–		–		8	0
Career total			207	44	12	1	14	4	3	3	236	52

=== International goals ===
Scores and results list Armenia's goal tally first.

No	Date	Venue	Opponent	Score	Result	Competition
1.	4 June 2017	Vazgen Sargsyan Republican Stadium, Yerevan, Armenia	Saint Kitts and Nevis	1–0	5–0	Friendly
2.	10 June 2017	Podgorica City Stadium, Podgorica, Montenegro	Montenegro	1–4	1–4	2018 FIFA World Cup qualification
3.	4 September 2017	Hrazdan Stadium, Yerevan, Armenia	Denmark	1–0	1–4	2018 FIFA World Cup qualification

== Honours ==
Luch-Energiya

- Russian PFL, East conference: 2012–13
- Russian NFL Cup: 2014

Lokomotiv

- Uzbekistan Super Cup: 2014

Istiklol

- Tajik Supercup: 2019
