= Komron Tursunov =

Tajik footballer (born 1996)

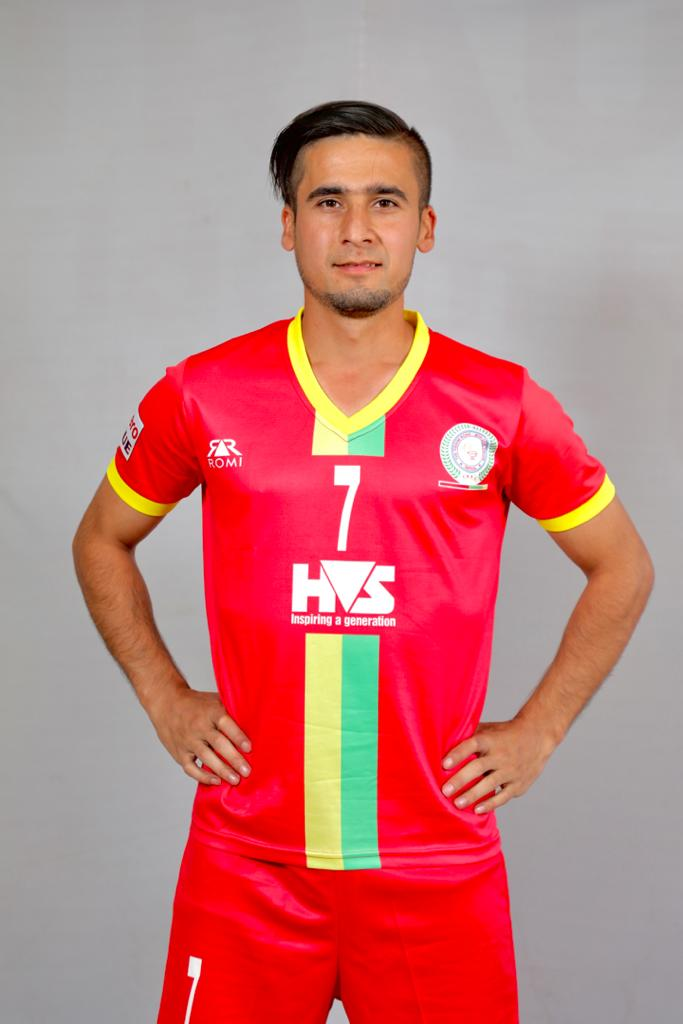
- Tursunov with TRAU in 2021

Personal information
- Full name: Komron Tursunov
- Date of birth: 24 April 1996 (age 30)
- Place of birth: Tursunzoda, Tajikistan
- Height: 1.72 m (5 ft 8 in)
- Positions: Attacking midfielder; forward

Team information
- Current team: Khujand
- Number: 28

Senior career*
Years	Team	Apps	(Gls)
2015–2017	Regar-TadAZ	57	(23)
2018–2019	Istiklol	31	(3)
2019–2020	Mohun Bagan	8	(2)
2020–2021	TRAU	13	(6)
2021	Khujand	12	(4)
2021–2022	Rajasthan United		
2022	Churchill Brothers	16	(6)
2022–2023	TRAU	18	(8)
2023−2024	Gokulam Kerala	19	(5)
2024	Dejan	4	(1)
2025	Ravshan Kulob		
2025	Malappuram		
2025–2026	Kopa Tigers Birbhum		
2026–	Khujand		

International career
2018–	Tajikistan	28	(6)
- * Club domestic league appearances and goals

Komron Tursunov (Tajik: ‌Комрон Турсунов; born 24 April 1996) is a Tajik professional footballer who plays as an attacking midfielder for Khujand and the Tajikistan national team.

== Club career ==
In August 2019, Tursunov went on trial with Utrecht for two weeks, with Rosenborg also stating an interest in having Tursunov on trial.

=== Mohun Bagan ===
On 21 December 2019, Tursunov signed for Mohun Bagan, in the Hero I-League. Tursunov scored his first goal for the club against NEROCA FC at the Khuman Lampak Main Stadium. They clinched the league title that season.

=== TRAU ===
In 2020, he moved to another I-League side TRAU on a one-year deal. He scored six goals in 2020–21 season alongside league's fastest ever goal (9 seconds), as his team achieved third place.

=== Khujand ===
On 2 August 2021, Tursunov returned to the Tajikistan Higher League, signing for FK Khujand.

=== Rajasthan United ===
On 6 December 2021, Tursunov moved back to India and signed with newly promoted I-League club Rajasthan United FC on a season-long deal.

=== Churchill Brothers ===
Tursunov moved to Churchill Brothers on 29 January 2022. He was signed as a replacement to Lebanese centre-back Shadi Skaf. He marked his debut for Churchill Brothers with an assist for a goal scored by Sekou Sylla against RoundGlass Punjab on 4 March. The match ended in a 2–2 draw. His first goal for the club came in the 2–1 win against Aizawl on 24 March, when he converted an assist from Kenneth Ikechukwu in the stoppage time of the first half. He scored again in the next game, against Sreenidi Deccan in a 1–1 draw. After failing to convert two easy chances, Tursunov scored in his third, his team's second goal in a 4–2 win, handing their NEROCA their first defeat of the season.

=== TRAU ===
In August 2022, Tursunov returned to TRAU after one year. On 18 August, he scored on his return debut in the Imphal Derby against NEROCA in the Durand Cup, which ended in a 3–1 loss.

=== Gokulam Kerala ===
Tursunov joined another I-League club Gokulam Kerala in August 2023.

=== Ravshan Kulob ===
On 5 March 2025, Tajikistan Higher League club Ravshan Kulob announced the singing of Tursunov.

=== Malappuram ===
On 4 September 2025, Malappuram FC has signed Kamron Tursunov, a forward from Tajikistan, ahead of the Super League Kerala season.

== International career ==
Tursunov made his senior international debut on 2 October 2018 against Nepal. He was part of the Tajikistan team that reached quarter-finals of the 2023 AFC Asian Cup in Qatar.

== Career statistics ==
=== Club ===
As of 24 January 2025

Club	Season	League			National Cup		AFC		Other		Total	
Club	Season	Division	Apps	Goals	Apps	Goals	Apps	Goals	Apps	Goals	Apps	Goals
Regar-TadAZ	2015	Tajik League	18	7		5	–		–		18	12
Regar-TadAZ	2016	Tajik League	18	8		4	–		–		18	12
Regar-TadAZ	2017	Tajik League	21	8		3	–		–		21	11
Regar-TadAZ	Regar-TadAZ total		57	23		12	0	0	0	0	57	35
Istiklol	2018	Tajik League	16	2	6	2	1 (Note: Appearance(s) in AFC Cup)	0	1 (Note: Appearance(s) in Tajik Supercup)	0	24	4
Istiklol	2019	Tajik League	15	1	3	1	5 (Note: Appearance(s) in AFC Champions League)	0	1	0	24	2
Istiklol	Istiklol total		31	3	9	3	6	0	2	0	48	6
Mohun Bagan	2019–20	I-League	8	2	0	0	–		–		8	2
TRAU	2020–21	I-League	13	6	0	0	–		–		13	6
Khujand	2021	Tajik League	12	4	0	0	–		–		12	4
Rajasthan; United	2021–22	I-League	0	0	0	0	–		–		0	0
Churchill Brothers	2021–22	I-League	16	6	0	0	–		–		16	6
TRAU	2022–23	I-League	18	8	3 (Note: Appearance(s) in Durand Cup)	2	–		–		21	10
Gokulam Kerala	2023–24	I-League	19	5	1	0	–		–		20	5
Dejan	2024–25	Liga 2	4	1	0	0	–		–		4	1
Career total			178	58	13	17	6	0	2	0	199	75

=== International ===
Tajikistan national team
Year	Apps	Goals
2018	7	2
2019	7	2
2020	3	1
2021	5	1
2022	3	0
2023	3	0
Total	28	6

Statistics accurate as of match played 8 September 2023

=== International goals ===
Scores and results list Tajikistan's goal tally first.

No.	Date	Venue	Opponent	Score	Result	Competition
1 .	2 October 2018	Sylhet District Stadium, Sylhet, Bangladesh	Nepal	2–0	2–0	2018 Bangabandhu Cup
2.	9 October 2018	Cox's Bazar Stadium, Cox's Bazar, Bangladesh	Philippines	1–0	2–0	2018 Bangabandhu Cup
3.	7 July 2019	The Arena, Ahmedabad, India	India	1–2	4–2	2019 Intercontinental Cup
4.	10 July 2019	The Arena, Ahmedabad, India	Syria	1–0	2–0	2019 Intercontinental Cup
5.	12 November 2020	Zabeel Stadium, Dubai, United Arab Emirates	United Arab Emirates	2–0	2–3	Friendly
6.	15 June 2021	Yanmar Stadium, Osaka, Japan	Myanmar	1–0	4–0	2022 FIFA World Cup qualification

== Honours ==
Istiklol

- Tajik League: 2018, 2019
- Tajik Cup: 2019
- Tajik Supercup: 2019

Mohun Bagan

- I-League: 2019–20

Tajikistan

- King's Cup: 2022
- Bangabandhu Cup runner-up: 2018
- Intercontinental Cup runner-up: 2019
