= 2019 Tajik Super Cup =

- Event: Tajik Super Cup
Istiklol	Khujand
3	0
- Date: 29 March 2019
- Venue: Pamir Stadium, Dushanbe
- Referee: Gulmurodi Sadullo
- Attendance: 7,200

The 2019 Tajik Supercup was the 10th Tajik Supercup, an annual Tajik football match played between the winners of the previous season's Tajik League and Tajik Cup. The match was contested by 2018 League and Cup champions Istiklol, and the league runners-up Khujand. It was held at the Pamir Stadium in Dushanbe on 29 March 2019 with Istiklol winning the match 3–0. Istiklol took the lead through a Ruslan Koryan penalty in the 38th minute, both Koryan got his and Istiklol's second in the 50th minute. Koryan was replaced by Shahrom Samiev in the 58th minute, with the substitute going on to score the third and final goal of the game in the 90th minute to secure Istiklol their 8th Supercup.

== Match details ==
29 March 2019

Istiklol	3–0	Khujand
Koryan 38' (pen.), 50'; Samiev 90'	Report

Pamir Stadium, Dushanbe
Attendance: 7,200
Referee: Gulmurodi Sadullo

Istiklol	Khujand

GK	1	(Serbia) Nikola Stošić
DF	5	(Tajikistan) Iskandar Dzhalilov
DF	19	(Tajikistan) Akhtam Nazarov
DF	21	(Ukraine) Oleksiy Larin
MF	2	(Uzbekistan) Jalil Kimsanov		(substituted off) 75'
MF	7	(Serbia) Mihajlo Cakić	Booked	(substituted off) 58'
MF	10	(Russia) Alisher Dzhalilov	Booked
MF	18	(Tajikistan) Fatkhullo Fatkhuloev
MF	20	(Tajikistan) Amirbek Juraboev		(substituted off) 64'
FW	9	(Armenia) Ruslan Koryan		(substituted off) 58'
FW	28	(Tajikistan) Komron Tursunov
Substitutes:
MF	17	(Tajikistan) Ehson Panjshanbe	Booked	(substituted in) 58'
FW		(Tajikistan) Shahrom Samiev		(substituted in) 58'
MF	11	(Tajikistan) Muhammadjoni Hasan		(substituted in) 64'
DF	4	(Tajikistan) Bakhtior Kalandarov		(substituted in) 75'
Manager:
(Tajikistan) Khakim Fuzailov

GK	91	(Georgia (country)) Davit Kupatadze
DF	4	(Tajikistan) Davron Erghashev	Booked
DF	13	(Georgia (country)) Tornike Dzhimsheleishvili
DF	22	(Tajikistan) Manouchehr Ahmadov
DF	44	(Uzbekistan) Asiljon Begimkulov	Booked
MF	8	(Tajikistan) Bakhtiyor Choriyev		(substituted off) 77'
DF	14	(Tajikistan) Oybek Abdugafforov	Booked
MF	21	(Tajikistan) Firdavs Chakalov	Booked	(substituted off) 83'
FW	10	(Tajikistan) Dilshod Bozorov		(substituted off) 61'
FW	17	(Tajikistan) Dilshod Vasiev		(substituted off) 61'
FW	62	(Tajikistan) Jahongir Ergashev
Substitutes:
GK	16	(Tajikistan) Muminjon Gadoyboev
DF	2	(Tajikistan) Sohibdzhon Khakimov
MF	6	(Tajikistan) Khojiboy Ziyoev		(substituted in) 77'
MF	7	(Tajikistan) Komroni Mirzonajot
MF	18	(Tajikistan) Parviz Aliyev
MF	20	(Tajikistan) Amirjon Rakhimov		(substituted in) 83'
MF	23	(Tajikistan) Dilshodjon Karimov		(substituted in) 61'
FW	11	(Kyrgyzstan) Tursunali Rustamov		(substituted in) 61'
Manager:

== See also ==
- 2018 Tajik League
- 2018 Tajik Cup
