= Shahrom Samiev =

Tajik footballer

Personal information
- Full name: Shahrom Tagoymurodovich Samiev
- Date of birth: 8 February 2001 (age 25)
- Place of birth: Dushanbe, Tajikistan
- Height: 1.85 m (6 ft 1 in)
- Position: Forward

Team information
- Current team: Istiklol
- Number: 63

Senior career*
Years	Team	Apps	(Gls)
2018	CSKA Pamir Dushanbe		
2019–2020	Istiklol	18	(4)
2020	Rubin Kazan	0	(0)
2020–2021	Sheriff Tiraspol	0	(0)
2020–2021	→ Dinamo-Auto Tiraspol (loan)	19	(7)
2021–2022	Torpedo-BelAZ Zhodino	10	(3)
2022	Isloch Minsk Raion	8	(1)
2023	Zimbru Chișinău	9	(1)
2023	Milsami Orhei	10	(2)
2024	Andijon	19	(2)
2025	Khorazm	28	(6)
2026	Al-Karma	10	(0)
2026–	Istiklol	0	(0)

International career^{‡}
2019–	Tajikistan	39	(9)
- * Club domestic league appearances and goals as of 14 July 2026 ‡ National team caps and goals as of 20:15, 5 June 2025 (UTC)

Shahrom Tagoymurodovich Samiev (Tajik: Шахром Тагоймуродович Самиев, Russian: Шахром Тагоймуродович Самиев; born 8 February 2001) is a Tajik professional football player who currently plays for Tajikistan Higher League club, Istiklol.

== Club career ==
=== Istiklol ===
In 2019, Samiev signed for Istiklol.

=== Rubin Kazan ===
On 14 February 2020, Istiklol announced that Samiev had left the club to join Rubin Kazan on a free transfer. For 2020–21 season, a new limit of 8 foreign players was introduced in the Russian Premier League, and was not registered by the club with the league.

=== Sheriff Tiraspol ===
On 17 August 2020, Samiev left Rubin Kazan to sign for Sheriff Tiraspol, and was immediately loaned out to fellow Divizia Națională club Dinamo-Auto Tiraspol until the end of the year.

=== Torpedo-BeIAZ Zhodino ===
On 2 July 2021, Samiev left Sheriff Tiraspol and signed for Belarusian Premier League club Torpedo-BelAZ Zhodino.

=== Islock Minsk ===
On 24 July 2022, Samiev joined fellow Belarusian Premier League club Isloch Minsk.

=== Zimbru Chisinău ===
In February 2023, he signed for Moldovan Super Liga club Zimbru Chișinău.

=== Andijon ===
In February 2024, Samiev joined Uzbekistan Super League club Andijon.

=== Al-Karma ===
In February 2026, Samiev joined Iraq Stars League club Al-Karma.

=== Istiklol return ===
On 14 July 2026, Tajikistan Higher League culub Istiklol announced the return of Samiev, on a contract until the end of the season.

== International career ==
Samiev made his senior team debut on 7 June 2019, scoring the equaliser in a 1–1 draw against Afghanistan.

== Career statistics ==
=== Club ===
As of match played 9 March 2025

Club	Season	League			National Cup		Continental		Other		Total	
Club	Season	Division	Apps	Goals	Apps	Goals	Apps	Goals	Apps	Goals	Apps	Goals
Istiklol	2019	Tajik League	18	4	6	5	4 (Note: Zero appearances in the AFC Champions League, and four appearances and one goal in the AFC Cup)	1	1 (Note: Appearance and goal in the Tajik Supercup)	1	29	11
Rubin Kazan	2019–20	Russian Premier League	0	0	0	0	-		-		0	0
Rubin Kazan	2020–21	Russian Premier League	0	0	0	0	-		-		0	0
Rubin Kazan	Total		0	0	0	0	0	0	0	0	0	0
Sheriff Tiraspol	2020–21	Divizia Națională	0	0	0	0	0 (Note: Zero appearances in the UEFA Champions League and zero appearances in the UEFA Europa League)	0	—		0	0
Dinamo-Auto Tiraspol (loan)	2020–21	Divizia Națională	19	7	2	2	—		—		21	9
Torpedo-BelAZ Zhodino	2021	Belarusian Premier League	8	3	2	0	1 (Note: Appearances in the UEFA Europa Conference League)	0	—		11	3
Torpedo-BelAZ Zhodino	2022	Belarusian Premier League	2	0	0	0	—		—		2	0
Torpedo-BelAZ Zhodino	Total		10	3	2	0	1	0	0	0	13	3
Isloch Minsk Raion	2022	Belarusian Premier League	8	1	1	0	—		—		9	1
Zimbru Chișinău	2022–23	Moldovan Super Liga	8	1	1	0	—		—		9	1
Zimbru Chișinău	2023–24	Moldovan Super Liga	1	0	0	0	4	0	—		5	0
Zimbru Chișinău	Total		9	1	1	0	4	0	0	0	14	1
Milsami Orhei	2023–24	Moldovan Super Liga	10	2	0	0	0	0	—		10	2
Andijon	2024	Uzbekistan Super League	19	2	5	0	—		—		24	2
Khorazm	2025	Uzbekistan Super League	28	6	1	0	—		—		29	6
Career total			121	26	18	7	9	1	1	1	149	35

=== International ===
Tajikistan
Year	Apps	Goals
2019	6	2
2020	0	0
2021	5	2
2022	6	0
2023	5	3
2024	7	1
2025	3	1
Total	39	9

Statistics accurate as of match played 5 June 2025

=== International goals ===
Scores and results list Tajikistan's goal tally first.

No.	Date	Venue	Opponent	Score	Result	Competition
1.	7 June 2019	Pamir Stadium, Dushanbe, Tajikistan	Afghanistan	1–1	1–1	Friendly
2.	7 July 2019	The Arena, Ahmedabad, India	India	4–2	4–2	2019 Intercontinental Cup
3.	25 March 2021	Pamir Stadium, Dushanbe, Tajikistan	Mongolia	3–0	3–0	2022 FIFA World Cup qualification
4.	15 June 2021	Yanmar Stadium, Osaka, Japan	Myanmar	4–0	4–0	2022 FIFA World Cup qualification
5.	17 October 2023	Bukit Jalil National Stadium, Kuala Lumpur, Malaysia	Malaysia	2–0	2–0	Merdeka Tournament
6.	16 November 2023	Pamir Stadium, Dushanbe, Tajikistan	Jordan	1–0	1–1	2026 FIFA World Cup qualification
7.	21 November 2023	Jinnah Sports Stadium, Islamabad, Pakikistan	Pakistan	6–1	6–1	2026 FIFA World Cup qualification
8.	19 November 2024	Pamir Stadium, Dushanbe, Tajikistan	Afghanistan	2–0	3–1	Friendly
9.	5 June 2025	Phnom Penh Olympic Stadium, Phnom Penh, Cambodia	Cambodia	1–0	2–1	Friendly
10.	29 August 2025	Hisor Central Stadium, Hisor, Tajikistan	India	1–2	1–2	2025 CAFA Nations Cup
11.	4 September 2025	Hisor Central Stadium, Hisor, Tajikistan	Iran	1–2	2–2	2025 CAFA Nations Cup
12.	9 October 2025	Hisor Central Stadium, Hisor, Tajikistan	Maldives	1–0	2–0	2027 AFC Asian Cup qualification

== Honours ==
Istiklol

- Tajik League: 2019
- Tajik Cup: 2019
- Tajik Supercup: 2019

Tajikistan

- King's Cup: 2022
- Merdeka Tournament: 2023
