= Iskandar Dzhalilov =

Tajikistani footballer (born 1992)

Personal information
- Full name: Iskandar Fatkhulloyevich Dzhalilov
- Date of birth: 1 June 1992 (age 34)
- Place of birth: Dushanbe, Tajikistan
- Height: 1.80 m (5 ft 11 in)
- Position: Right-back

Youth career
- 2008–2010: CSKA Moscow

Senior career*
Years	Team	Apps	(Gls)
2010–2014	Rubin Kazan	0	(0)
2012	→ Neftekhimik (loan)	0	(0)
2013	→ Turnu Severin (loan)	11	(0)
2013-2014	→ Istiklol (loan)	5	(0)
2014–2016	Volga Nizhny Novgorod	35	(0)
2016–2017	Dunav Ruse	26	(0)
2017–2018	Baltika Kaliningrad	17	(0)
2018	Lokomotiv Plovdiv	2	(0)
2018	Botev Vratsa	0	(0)
2019–2022	Istiklol	38	(0)
Total		134	(0)

International career
2009	Russia U17	18	(2)
2010	Russia U18	6	(0)
2011	Russia U19	4	(0)
2014–2022	Tajikistan	24	(1)
- * Club domestic league appearances and goals

Iskandar Dzhalilov (Tajik: Искандар Ҷалилов; born 1 June 1992) is a Tajik former professional footballer who played as a right-back. Dzhalilov also holds Russian citizenship, and is second cousins of fellow footballers Manuchekhr Dzhalilov and Alisher Dzhalilov.

== Career ==
In September 2013, Dzhalilov moved on loan from Rubin Kazan to Istiklol, returning to Rubin in January 2014 after his loan deal with expired.

He made his Russian National Football League debut for Volga Nizhny Novgorod on 6 July 2014 in a game against Sibir Novosibirsk. Dzhalilov relocated to Bulgaria in July 2016, signing a contract with newly promoted Bulgarian First League football club Dunav Ruse. He was released in June 2017.

On 5 July 2017, Dzhalilov signed with Russian side Baltika Kaliningrad for 1+1 years.

On 19 June 2018, Dzhalilov returned to Bulgaria, signing for two years with Lokomotiv Plovdiv. On 30 July 2018 Dzhalilov's contract with Lokomotiv Plovdiv was cancelled by mutual consent.

In March 2021, whilst on international duty with Tajikistan, Dzhalilov suffered a dislocated foot and fractured lower leg.

On 13 May 2022, Dzhalilov announced that due to persistent injuries he would be retiring from football following Istiklol's game against Khujand on 15 May 2022.

== Career statistics ==
=== Club ===
Appearances and goals by club, season and competition
Club	Season	League			National cup		Continental		Other		Total	
Club	Season	Division	Apps	Goals	Apps	Goals	Apps	Goals	Apps	Goals	Apps	Goals
Rubin Kazan	2010	Russian Premier League	0	0	0	0	0 (Note: Zero appearances in the UEFA Europa League, zero appearances in the UEFA Champions League)	0	–		0	0
Rubin Kazan	2011–12	Russian Premier League	0	0	0	0	0 (Note: Zero appearances in the UEFA Europa League, zero appearances in the UEFA Champions League)	0	–		0	0
Rubin Kazan	2012–13	Russian Premier League	0	0	0	0	0 (Note: Appearances in the UEFA Europa League)	0	–		0	0
Rubin Kazan	2013–14	Russian Premier League	0	0	0	0	0	0	–		0	0
Rubin Kazan	Total		0	0	0	0	0	0	0	0	0	0
Neftekhimik Nizhnekamsk (loan)	2012–13	Russian National League	0	0	0	0	–		–		0	0
Turnu Severin (loan)	2012–13	Liga I	11	0	0	0	–		–		11	0
Istiklol (loan)	2013	Tajik League	5	0	1	0	–		–		6	0
Volga Nizhny Novgorod	2014–15	Russian National League	28	0	1	0	–		–		29	0
Volga Nizhny Novgorod	2015–16	Russian National League	7	0	1	0	–		–		8	0
Volga Nizhny Novgorod	Total		35	0	2	0	0	0	0	0	37	0
Dunav Ruse	2016–17	First Professional Football League	26	0	1	0	–		–		27	0
Baltika Kaliningrad	2017–18	Russian National League	17	0	1	0	–		–		18	0
Lokomotiv Plovdiv	2018–19	First Professional Football League	2	0	0	0	–		–		2	0
Botev Vratsa	2018–19	First Professional Football League	0	0	0	0	–		–		0	0
Istiklol	2019	Tajik League	16	0	4	2	7 (Note: One appearances in the AFC Champions League, six appearances in the AFC Cup)	0	1 (Note: Appearances in the Tajik Supercup)	0	28	2
Istiklol	2020	Tajik League	16	0	2	0	2 (Note: One appearance in the AFC Champions League, one appearance in the AFC Cup)	0	1	0	21	0
Istiklol	2021	Tajik League	4	0	2	0	0 (Note: Appearances in the AFC Champions League)	0	0	0	6	0
Istiklol	2022	Tajik League	2	0	0	0	6	0	1	0	9	0
Istiklol	Total		38	0	8	2	15	0	3	0	64	2
Career total			134	0	13	2	15	0	3	0	165	2

=== International ===
Appearances and goals by national team and year
National team	Year	Apps	Goals
Tajikistan	2014	1	0
Tajikistan	2015	0	0
Tajikistan	2016	3	0
Tajikistan	2017	5	0
Tajikistan	2018	1	0
Tajikistan	2019	10	0
Tajikistan	2020	1	0
Tajikistan	2021	2	0
Tajikistan	2022	2	0
Total		25	0

== Honours ==
Istiklol

- Tajik League: 2019, 2020, 2021
- Tajik Cup: 2019
- Tajik Supercup: 2019, 2020, 2022
