= Bakhtior Kalandarov =

Tajikistani footballer

Personal information
- Date of birth: 14 June 1992 (age 34)
- Place of birth: Sarvati Istiqlol, Tajikistan
- Height: 1.86 m (6 ft 1 in)
- Position: Centre-back

Team information
- Current team: Regar-TadAZ
- Number: 4

Senior career*
Years	Team	Apps	(Gls)
2018	Khatlon		
2018	Regar-TadAZ		
2019	Istiklol	6	(0)
2019	Kuktosh Rudaki		
2020	CSKA Pamir Dushanbe	14	(1)
2021	FK Istaravshan	24	(1)
2022	Aizawl	14	(0)
2022	Ravshan Kulob	11	(0)
2023–	Regar-TadAZ	57	(2)

International career^{‡}
2018–	Tajikistan	3	(0)
- * Club domestic league appearances and goals as of 16 March 2026 ‡ National team caps and goals as of 07:57, 19 December 2018 (UTC)

Bakhtior Kalandarov (born 14 June 1992) is a Tajik professional footballer who plays as a defender for Regar-TadAZ in the Tajik League.

== Career ==
=== Club ===
On 25 July 2019, FC Istiklol released Kalandarov by mutual consent.

=== Aizawl ===
On 23 February 2022, Kalandarov made his move to India and signed with I-League club Aizawl on a season-long deal.

He made his debut for the club, on 8 March 2022, against Rajasthan United, which ended in a 1–0 defeat.

=== International ===
Kalandarov made his senior team debut on 2 October 2018 against Nepal in their 2–0 win.

== Career statistics ==
=== Club ===
As of 9 November 2022

Club	Season	League			Cup		Continental		Total	
Club	Season	Division	Apps	Goals	Apps	Goals	Apps	Goals	Apps	Goals
Istiklol	2019	Tajik League	6	0	1 (Note: Appearance(s) in Tajik Super Cup)	0	1 (Note: Appearance(s) in AFC Champions League)	0	8	0
CSKA Pamir; Dushanbe	2020	Tajik League	14	1	0	0	–		14	1
FK Istaravshan	2021	Tajik League	24	1	0	0	–		24	1
Aizawl	2021–22	I-League	14	0	0	0	–		14	0
Ravshan Kulob	2022	Tajik League	11	0	0	0	–		11	0
Career total			69	2	1	0	1	0	71	2

=== International ===
As of matches played till 13 December 2018

National team	Year	Apps	Goals
Tajikistan	2018	3	0
Total		3	0

== Honours ==
Istiklol

- Tajik Supercup: 2019
