= Akmal Saburov =

Tajikistani footballer

Personal information
- Full name: Akmal Saburov
- Date of birth: 22 October 1987 (age 39)
- Place of birth: Tajik SSR
- Height: 1.76 m (5 ft 9 in)
- Position: Midfielder

Team information
- Current team: Vakhsh Qurghonteppa

Senior career*
Years	Team	Apps	(Gls)
2003–2010	Vakhsh Qurghonteppa		
2011–2012	Istiklol	27	(0)
2012	Regar-TadAZ		
2013–2016	Daleron-Uroteppa		
2017–	Vakhsh Qurghonteppa		

International career^{‡}
2009–	Tajikistan	18	(0)
- * Club domestic league appearances and goals as of 27 November 2015 ‡ National team caps and goals as of 27 November 2015

Akmal Saburov (born 22 October 1987) is a Tajikistani footballer who plays for Vakhsh Qurghonteppa and the Tajikistan national football team.

== Career ==
=== Club ===
In June 2012, Saburov moved from FC Istiklol to Regar-TadAZ.

In March 2017, Saburov was registered by Tajik League side Vakhsh Qurghonteppa for their upcoming season.

== Career statistics ==
=== International ===
Tajikistan national team
Year	Apps	Goals
2009	2	0
2010	5	0
2011	11	0
Total	18	0

Statistics accurate as of match played 15 November 2011

== Personal life ==
In July 2010, Saburov and his wife had a baby daughter.

== Honours ==
Vakhsh Qurghonteppa

- Tajik League (1): 2009

Istiklol

- Tajik League (1): 2011

Regar-TadAZ

- Tajik Cup (1): 2012
