= Yuriy Solomka =

Ukrainian footballer

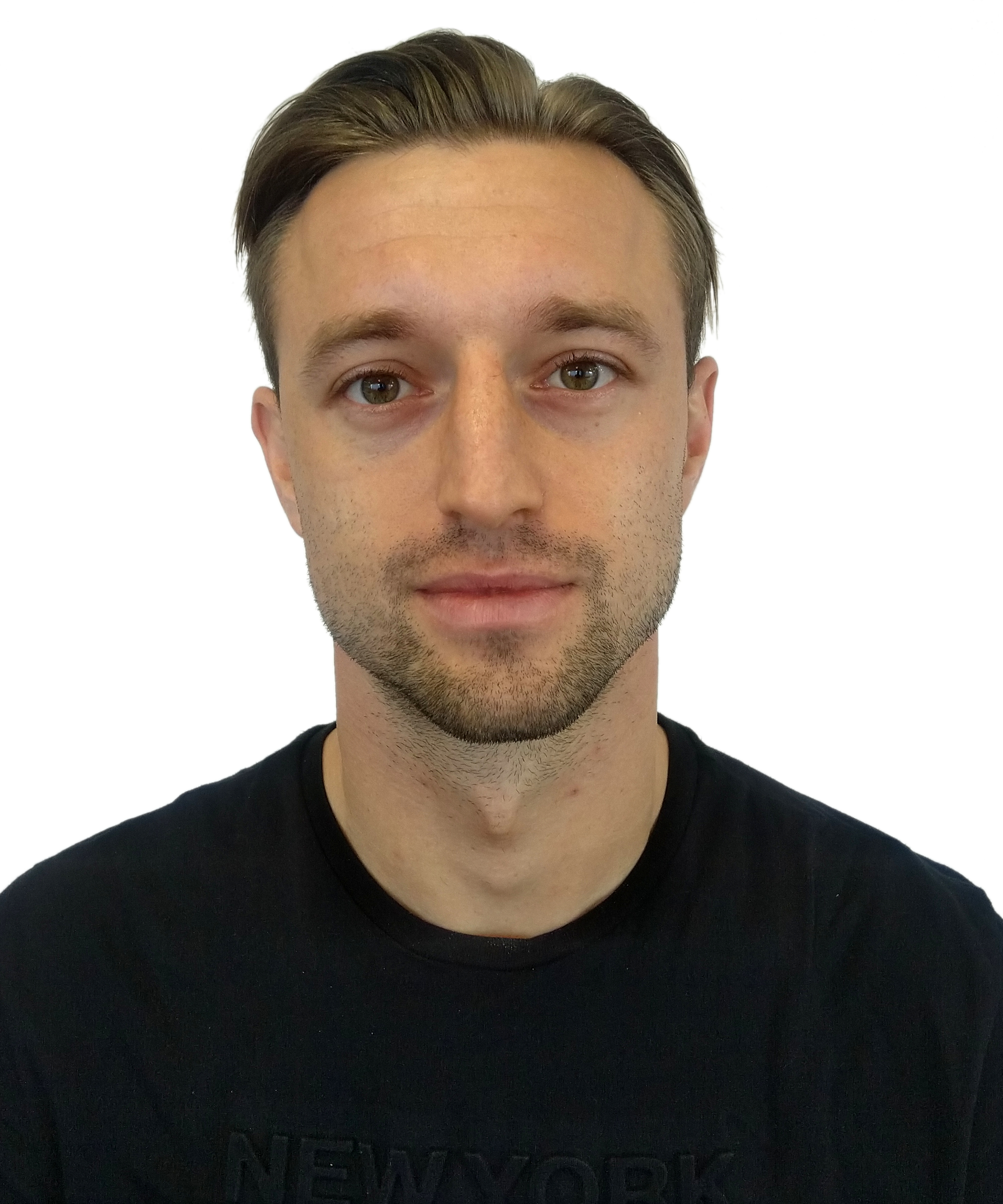

Personal information
- Full name: Yuriy Anatoliyovych Solomka
- Date of birth: 4 January 1990 (age 36)
- Place of birth: Pokrovske, Ukrainian SSR
- Height: 1.81 m (5 ft 11 1/2 in)
- Position: Striker

Team information
- Current team: Veres Rivne
- Number: 69

Youth career
- 2003–2007: UOR Donetsk

Senior career*
| Years | Team | Apps | (Gls) |
| 2007–2009 | Tytan Armyansk | 15 | (1) |
| 2009–2012 | Metalurh Donetsk | 0 | (0) |
| 2012–2014 | Oleksandriya | 19 | (0) |
| 2014 | UkrAhroKom Holovkivka | 10 | (2) |
| 2014–2015 | Poltava | 23 | (7) |
| 2015 | Chornomorets Odesa | 3 | (0) |
| 2015–2016 | Helios Kharkiv | 12 | (1) |
| 2016–2017 | Poltava | 32 | (4) |
| 2017–2018 | Kolos Kovalivka | 37 | (4) |
| 2019 | Polissya Zhytomyr | 8 | (2) |
| 2019–2020 | Veres Rivne | 33 | (9) |
- * Club domestic league appearances and goals as of 23:00, 23 July 2019 (UTC)

Yuriy Solomka (Ukrainian: Юрій Анатолійович Соломка; born 4 January 1990) is a former professional Ukrainian football striker who played for Veres Rivne.

== Career ==
Solomka is a product of youth team system of UOR Donetsk.

Solomka spent his career in the different Ukrainian First League teams and on 10 July 2015 he signed a two years contract with the Ukrainian Premier League FC Chornomorets.
