= Mihajlo Cakić =

Serbian footballer

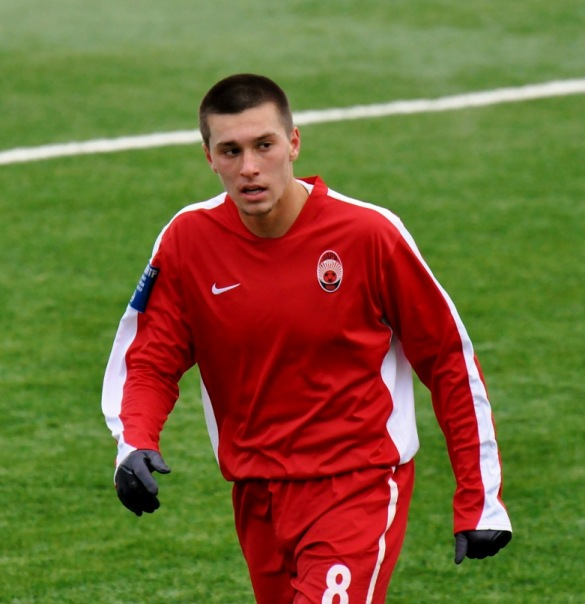
- Cakić with Zorya in 2011

Personal information
- Full name: Mihajlo Cakić
- Date of birth: 27 May 1990 (age 36)
- Place of birth: Leskovac, SFR Yugoslavia
- Height: 1.82 m (6 ft 0 in)
- Position: Midfielder

Youth career
- Rad
- Red Star
- Partizan

Senior career*
Years	Team	Apps	(Gls)
2008–2010	Zemun	26	(1)
2010	Čukarički	11	(3)
2011–2014	Zorya Luhansk	14	(0)
2012–2013	→ Slavia Mozyr (loan)	33	(0)
2014	OFK Beograd	2	(0)
2015	Tiraspol	10	(0)
2015	Sheriff Tiraspol	7	(1)
2016	Zemun	11	(2)
2017–2018	Sinđelić Beograd	51	(9)
2019	Istiklol Dushanbe	1	(0)
2019–2020	Sinđelić Beograd	18	(0)
Total		184	(16)

International career
2009	Serbia U19	5	(0)
2011	Serbia U21	2	(0)
- * Club domestic league appearances and goals as of 31 July 2020

Mihajlo Cakić (Serbian Cyrillic: Михајло Цакић; born 27 May 1990) is a Serbian former footballer.

== Career ==
=== Club ===
On 9 June 2015, Cakić signed for Sheriff Tiraspol, leaving at the end of his contract on 5 December 2015.

On 2 July 2019, Cakić left FC Istiklol by mutual consent.

=== International ===
Cakić played for the Serbian national under-21 team at the Valeriy Lobanovskyi Memorial Tournament in 2011.

== Career statistics ==
=== Club ===
As of match played 19 June 2019

Club	Season	League			National Cup		Continental		Other		Total	
Club	Season	Division	Apps	Goals	Apps	Goals	Apps	Goals	Apps	Goals	Apps	Goals
Sheriff Tiraspol	2015–16	Moldovan National Division	7	1	0	0	1	0	0	0	8	1
Zemun	2016–17	Serbian First League	11	2	1	0	-		-		12	2
Sinđelić Beograd	2016–17	Serbian First League	13	2	0	0	-		-		13	2
Sinđelić Beograd	2017–18	Serbian First League	20	7	0	0	-		-		20	7
Sinđelić Beograd	2018–19	Serbian First League	18	0	0	0	-		-		18	0
Sinđelić Beograd	Total		51	9	0	0	-	-	-	-	51	9
Istiklol	2019	Tajik League	1	0	0	0	6	1	1	0	8	1
Career total			70	12	1	0	7	1	1	0	79	13

== Honours ==
=== Club ===
Istiklol

- Tajik Supercup (1): 2019
