= Ehson Panjshanbe =

Tajikistani footballer

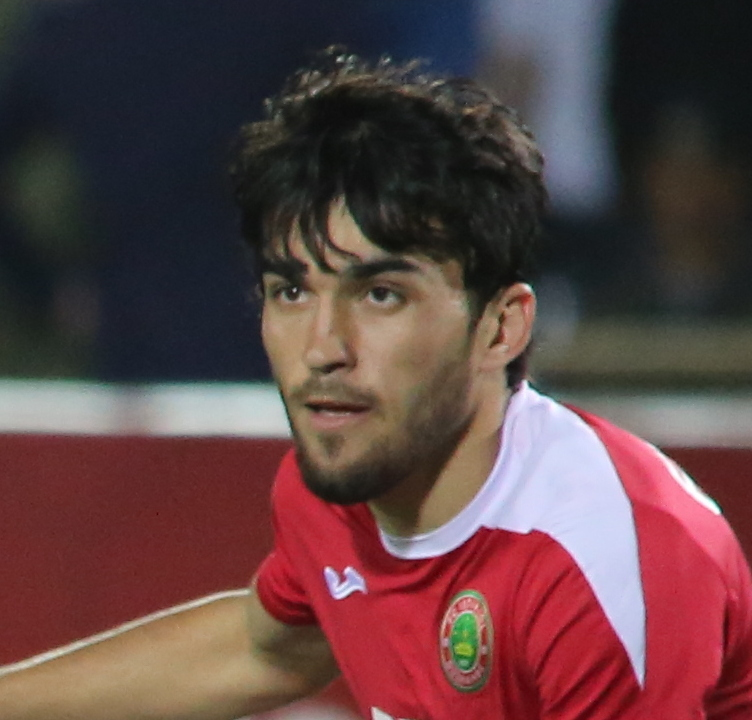
- Panjshanbe in 2019

Personal information
- Full name: Ehson Panjshanbe
- Date of birth: 12 May 1999 (age 27)
- Place of birth: Rushon, Tajikistan
- Height: 1.72 m (5 ft 8 in)
- Position: Midfielder

Team information
- Current team: Istiklol
- Number: 17

Senior career*
Years	Team	Apps	(Gls)
2016–2020	Istiklol	64	(13)
2016	→ Barkchi (loan)		
2020–2022	Navbahor Namangan	43	(2)
2022	Zob Ahan	5	(0)
2023–2024	Istiklol	39	(13)
2025	Sogdiana	14	(1)
2025	Istiklol	6	(4)
2026	Terengganu	9	(1)
2026–	Istiklol	0	(0)

International career^{‡}
2016–	Tajikistan	67	(8)
- * Club domestic league appearances and goals as of 22:30, 15 May 2026 (UTC) ‡ National team caps and goals as of 09:02, 18 November 2025 (UTC)

Ehson Panjshanbe (Tajik: Эҳсон Панҷшанбе) is a Tajik professional footballer who plays as a midfielder for Tajikistan Higher League club Istiklol and the Tajikistan national team.

== Career ==
=== Club ===
In June 2016, Panjshanbe returned to FC Istiklol after a loan spell with Barkchi.

On 31 August 2020, FC Istiklol confirmed that Panjshanbe had moved to PFC Navbahor Namangan on a contract until the end of 2022.

In July 2022, Panjshanbe signed for Persian Gulf Pro League club Zob Ahan Esfahan.

On 9 February 2023, Istiklol announced the return of Panjshanbe. On 19 June 2024, Panjshanbe scored the Istiklol's 1,000th league goal.

On 1 January 2025, Panjshanbe joined Sogdiana Jizzakh on a one-year contract after his Istiklol contract had expired.

On 28 July 2025, Panjshanbe returned to Istiklol, on a contract until the end of 2025.

On 9 January 2026, Istiklol announced that Panjshanbe had left the club at the end of his contract, and that he'd signed a one-year contract with Malaysia Super League club Terengganu.

On 15 July 2026, Tajikistan Higher League club Istiklol announced the return to the club of Panjshanbe, to a one-year contract.

=== International ===
Panjshanbe made his debut for Tajikistan on 2 June 2016 against Bangladesh.

== Career statistics ==
=== Club ===
As of match played 26 November 2025

Club	Season	League			National Cup		Continental		Other		Total	
Club	Season	Division	Apps	Goals	Apps	Goals	Apps	Goals	Apps	Goals	Apps	Goals
Istiklol	2016	Tajikistan Higher League	4	0	3	1	0 (Note: Appearances and goals in the AFC Cup)	0	0 (Note: Appearances and goals in the Tajik Supercup)	0	7	1
Istiklol	2017	Tajikistan Higher League	15	1	3	1	3	0	0	0	21	2
Istiklol	2018	Tajikistan Higher League	16	1	2	0	6	0	0	0	24	1
Istiklol	2019	Tajikistan Higher League	18	7	6	2	7 (Note: One appearances in the AFC Champions League, Six appearances and one goal in the AFC Cup)	1	1	0	32	10
Istiklol	2020	Tajikistan Higher League	11	4	1	1	3 (Note: Two appearances in the AFC Champions League, one appearance in the AFC Cup)	0	1	0	16	5
Istiklol	Total		64	13	15	5	19	1	2	0	100	19
Navbahor Namangan	2020	Uzbekistan Super League	11	0	2	0	-		-		13	0
Navbahor Namangan	2021	Uzbekistan Super League	25	2	4	1	-		-		29	3
Navbahor Namangan	2022	Uzbekistan Super League	7	0	2	0	-		-		9	0
Navbahor Namangan	Total		43	2	8	1	-	-	-	-	51	3
Zob Ahan Esfahan	2022–23	Persian Gulf Pro League	5	0	0	0	-		-		5	0
Istiklol	2023	Tajikistan Higher League	20	8	5	1	6 (Note: Appearances and goals in the AFC Champions League)	0	1	0	32	9
Istiklol	2024	Tajikistan Higher League	19	5	4	2	6 (Note: Appearances in the AFC Champions League Two)	1	1	0	30	8
Istiklol	Total		39	13	9	3	12	1	2	0	62	18
Sogdiana	2025	Uzbekistan Super League	14	1	1	0	-		-		15	1
Istiklol	2025	Tajikistan Higher League	6	4	2	0	6 (Note: Appearances and goals in the AFC Champions League Two)	0	0	0	14	4
Career total			171	33	35	9	37	2	4	0	247	44

=== International ===
Tajikistan national team
Year	Apps	Goals
2016	1	0
2017	3	0
2018	3	0
2019	12	0
2020	3	0
2021	7	2
2022	9	2
2023	7	1
2024	11	0
2025	10	3
Total	66	8

Statistics accurate as of match played 18 November 2025

Ehson Panjshanbe's international goals for Tajikistan
#	Date	Venue	Opponent	Score	Result	Competition
1.	29 May 2021	Khalid bin Mohammed Stadium, Sharjah, United Arab Emirates	Thailand	1–2	2–2	Friendly
2.	7 June 2021	Panasonic Stadium Suita, Suita, Japan	Japan	1–1	1–4	2022 FIFA World Cup qualification
3.	8 June 2022	Dolen Omurzakov Stadium, Bishkek, Kyrgyzstan	Myanmar	4–0	4–0	2023 AFC Asian Cup qualification
4.	22 September 2022	700th Anniversary Stadium, Chiang Mai, Thailand	Trinidad and Tobago	2–1	2–1	2022 King's Cup
5.	21 November 2023	Jinnah Sports Stadium, Islamabad, Pakistan	Pakistan	4–1	6–1	2026 FIFA World Cup qualification
6.	5 June 2025	Phnom Penh Olympic Stadium, Phnom Penh, Cambodia	Cambodia	1–0	2–1	Friendly
7.	1 September 2025	Hisor Central Stadium, Hisor, Tajikistan	Afghanistan	1–0	2–0	2025 CAFA Nations Cup
8.	18 November 2025	Territory Rugby League Stadium, Darwin, Australia	Timor-Leste	2–0	5–0	2027 AFC Asian Cup qualification
9	5 June 2026	TALCO Arena, Tursunzoda, Tajikistan	India	3–0	3–1	Friendly

== Honours ==
Istiklol

- Tajikistan Higher League: 2016, 2017, 2018 2019, 2023
- Tajikistan Cup: 2016, 2018, 2019, 2023
- Tajik Supercup: 2019, 2020, 2024

Tajikistan

- King's Cup: 2022
