= 2021 FC Turan season =

FC Turan
2021 season
- Manager: Abdukhalik Buribayev
- Stadium: Karasai Stadium
- Premier League: 12th
- Kazakhstan Cup: Group stage
- Top goalscorer: League: Temirlan Amirov (5); All: Two Players(5)
- Highest home attendance: 2,000 vs Kaisar (4 April 2021)
- Lowest home attendance: 0 vs Caspiy (19 April 2021) 0 vs Kairat (31 July 2021) 0 vs Caspiy (8 August 2021)
- Average home league attendance: 972 (24 October 2021)
| Home colours | Away colours |

The 2021 FC Turan season is Turan's the first season in the Kazakhstan Premier League, the highest tier of association football in Kazakhstan, since 2001. Turan will also take part in the Kazakhstan Cup.

== Season events ==
On 8 March, Turan announced the signing of Andrey Zaleski, Layonel Adams, Yevhen Smirnov, Stefan Živković, Milan Stojanović, Pavel Deobald and Nikita Bocharov.

On 30 March, Aleksandr Chizh joined Turan on loan from Dinamo Minsk for the season.

On 11 May, Wahyt Orazsähedow signed for Turan.

On 23 July, Turan announced the signing of Farhat Musabekov from Dordoi Bishkek.

On 30 July, Turan announced the signing of Yevhen Chumak from Metallurg Bekabad.

On 29 August, Turan announced the signing of Tamirlan Kozubayev from Shinnik Yaroslavl.

On 30 August, Turan announced the signings of Pavel Kriventsov from Kyzylzhar and Bekzhan Abdrakhman from Kyran.

== Squad ==
As of match played 30 October 2021

| No. | Name | Nationality | Position | Date of birth (age) | Signed from | Signed in | Contract ends | Apps. | Goals |
Goalkeepers
| 1 | Stanislav Pavlov | (Kazakhstan) | GK | 30 May 1994 (age 31) | Astana | 2021 | | 5 | 0 |
| 12 | Dauren Tokmagambetov | (Kazakhstan) | GK | 7 November 1997 (age 28) | Baikonur | 2020 | | | |
| 20 | Andrey Pasechenko | (Kazakhstan) | GK | 9 August 1987 (age 38) | Kyran | 2021 | | 27 | 0 |
| 27 | Bekzhan Toktarbay | (Kazakhstan) | GK | 22 March 1997 (age 28) | Akademia Ontustik-M | 2021 | | 0 | 0 |
Defenders
| 2 | Layonel Adams | (Russia) | DF | 9 August 1994 (age 31) | Caspiy | 2021 | | 17 | 0 |
| 3 | Tamirlan Kozubayev | (Kyrgyzstan) | DF | 1 July 1994 (age 31) | Shinnik Yaroslavl | 2021 | | 1 | 0 |
| 6 | Gafurzhan Nazarov | (Kazakhstan) | DF | 22 August 1996 (age 29) | Osdyusshor Zhas Ulan | 2020 | | | |
| 15 | Kasymzhan Taipov | (Kazakhstan) | DF | 19 February 1995 (age 30) | SDYuSShOR-8 Nursultan | 2020 | | | |
| 22 | Stefan Živković | (Serbia) | DF | 1 June 1990 (age 35) | Zhetysu | 2021 | | 30 | 2 |
| 25 | Aleksandr Chizh | (Belarus) | DF | 10 February 1997 (age 28) | loan from Dinamo Minsk | 2021 | | 18 | 1 |
| 26 | Olzhas Kerimzhanov | (Kazakhstan) | DF | 16 May 1989 (age 36) | Zhetysu | 2021 | | 25 | 0 |
| 31 | Andrey Zaleski | (Belarus) | DF | 20 January 1991 (age 35) | Zhetysu | 2021 | | 29 | 0 |
| 77 | Kuanysh Kalmuratov | (Kazakhstan) | DF | 27 August 1996 (age 29) | loan from Atyrau | 2021 | | 6 | 0 |
| | Bekzhan Abdrakhman | (Kazakhstan) | DF | 10 February 1995 (age 30) | Kyran | 2021 | | 0 | 0 |
Midfielders
| 4 | Yevhen Smirnov | (Ukraine) | MF | 16 April 1993 (age 32) | Sfântul Gheorghe | 2021 | | 11 | 0 |
| 5 | Bekzhan Alipbekov | (Kazakhstan) | MF | 17 May 1990 (age 35) | Kyran | 2019 | | | |
| 7 | Shynbolat Maksymkhan | (Kazakhstan) | MF | 8 February 1993 (age 32) | Unattached | 2019 | | | |
| 8 | Bekzat Beysenov | (Kazakhstan) | MF | 18 February 1987 (age 38) | Kyran | 2021 | | 17 | 0 |
| 14 | Branislav Janković | (Montenegro) | MF | 5 July 1999 (age 26) | Sutjeska Nikšić | 2021 | | 25 | 0 |
| 17 | Mardan Tolebek | (Kazakhstan) | MF | 18 December 1990 (age 35) | Ordabasy | 2021 | | 12 | 2 |
| 18 | Bakdaulet Akbergen | (Kazakhstan) | MF | 30 October 2000 (age 25) | Academy | 2020 | | | |
| 21 | Rodion Minaripov | (Kazakhstan) | MF | 6 May 1999 (age 26) | Kyran | 2019 | | | |
| 23 | Nurgaini Buribayev | (Kazakhstan) | MF | 20 August 2002 (age 23) | Astana-Zhas | 2020 | | | |
| 24 | Milan Stojanović | (Serbia) | MF | 10 May 1988 (age 37) | Okzhetpes | 2021 | | 16 | 0 |
| 29 | Farhat Musabekov | (Kyrgyzstan) | MF | 3 January 1994 (age 32) | Dordoi Bishkek | 2021 | | 11 | 0 |
| 47 | Nurzhigit Smatov | (Kazakhstan) | MF | 11 July 1996 (age 29) | Zhetysu | 2021 | | 2 | 0 |
| 57 | Pavel Deobald | (Russia) | MF | 25 June 1990 (age 35) | Noah | 2021 | | 23 | 1 |
| 69 | Nikita Bocharov | (Russia) | MF | 12 June 1992 (age 33) | Unattached | 2021 | | 20 | 0 |
| 70 | Dinmukhammed Omarov | (Kazakhstan) | MF | 14 February 2000 (age 25) | Kyran | 2021 | | 4 | 1 |
| 71 | Ghani Suleimen | (Kazakhstan) | MF | 22 April 2002 (age 23) | Kairat | 2021 | | 7 | 0 |
| 89 | Yevhen Chumak | (Ukraine) | MF | 25 August 1995 (age 30) | Metallurg Bekabad | 2021 | | 7 | 0 |
Forwards
| 9 | Temirlan Amirov | (Kazakhstan) | FW | 13 April 1997 (age 28) | Atyrau | 2021 | | 29 | 5 |
| 10 | Tanat Nuserbayev | (Kazakhstan) | FW | 1 January 1987 (age 39) | Okzhetpes | 2020 | | | |
| 11 | Asylzhan Abbas | (Kazakhstan) | FW | 11 June 1999 (age 26) | Kyran | 2019 | | | |
| 19 | Aliyar Mukhamed | (Kazakhstan) | FW | 20 March 2001 (age 24) | Akademia Ontustik-M | 2021 | | 24 | 0 |
| 78 | Pavel Kriventsov | (Kazakhstan) | FW | 16 January 1996 (age 30) | Kyzylzhar | 2021 | | 4 | 0 |
| 95 | Samir Fazli | (North Macedonia) | FW | 22 April 1991 (age 34) | Makedonija Gjorče Petrov | 2021 | | 5 | 1 |
| 99 | Stanley | (Nigeria) | FW | 25 June 1999 (age 26) | | 2020 | | 34 | 11 |
Players away on loan
Left during the season
| 3 | Nurlan Dairov | (Kazakhstan) | DF | 26 June 1995 (age 30) | Kairat | 2021 | | 2 | 0 |
| 3 | Wahyt Orazsähedow | (Turkmenistan) | FW | 26 January 1992 (age 34) | Unattached | 2021 | | 0 | 0 |
| 13 | Ermek Kuantaev | (Kazakhstan) | DF | 13 October 1990 (age 35) | Zhetysu | 2021 | | 2 | 0 |

== Transfers ==
=== In ===
| Date | Position | Nationality | Name | From | Fee | Ref. |
|---|---|---|---|---|---|---|
| 1 January 2021 | GK | (Kazakhstan) | Andrey Pasechenko | Kyran | Undisclosed | |
| 1 January 2021 | GK | (Kazakhstan) | Bekzhan Toktarbay | Akademia Ontustik-M | Undisclosed | |
| 1 January 2021 | MF | (Kazakhstan) | Bekzat Beysenov | Kyran | Undisclosed | |
| 1 January 2021 | FW | (Kazakhstan) | Aliyar Mukhamed | Akademia Ontustik-M | Undisclosed | |
| 20 January 2021 | DF | (Kazakhstan) | Nurlan Dairov | Kairat | Undisclosed | |
| 5 February 2021 | GK | (Kazakhstan) | Stanislav Pavlov | Astana | Undisclosed | |
| 5 February 2021 | MF | (Kazakhstan) | Mardan Tolebek | Ordabasy | Undisclosed | |
| 14 February 2021 | FW | (Kazakhstan) | Temirlan Amirov | Atyrau | Undisclosed | |
| 22 February 2021 | DF | (Kazakhstan) | Ermek Kuantaev | Zhetysu | Undisclosed | |
| 23 February 2021 | DF | (Kazakhstan) | Olzhas Kerimzhanov | Zhetysu | Undisclosed | |
| 8 March 2021 | DF | (Belarus) | Andrey Zaleski | Zhetysu | Undisclosed | |
| 8 March 2021 | DF | (Russia) | Layonel Adams | Caspiy | Undisclosed | |
| 8 March 2021 | DF | (Serbia) | Stefan Živković | Zhetysu | Undisclosed | |
| 8 March 2021 | MF | (Russia) | Nikita Bocharov | Unattached | Free | |
| 8 March 2021 | MF | (Russia) | Pavel Deobald | Noah | Undisclosed | |
| 8 March 2021 | MF | (Serbia) | Milan Stojanović | Okzhetpes | Undisclosed | |
| 8 March 2021 | MF | (Ukraine) | Yevhen Smirnov | Sfântul Gheorghe | Undisclosed | |
| 12 March 2021 | MF | (Montenegro) | Branislav Janković | Sutjeska Nikšić | Undisclosed | |
| 11 May 2021 | FW | (Turkmenistan) | Wahyt Orazsähedow | Unattached | Free | |
| 23 July 2021 | MF | (Kyrgyzstan) | Farhat Musabekov | Dordoi Bishkek | Undisclosed | |
| 30 July 2021 | MF | (Ukraine) | Yevhen Chumak | Metallurg Bekabad | Undisclosed | |
| 12 August 2021 | FW | (North Macedonia) | Samir Fazli | Makedonija Gjorče Petrov | Undisclosed | |
| 29 August 2021 | DF | (Kyrgyzstan) | Tamirlan Kozubayev | Shinnik Yaroslavl | Undisclosed | |
| 30 August 2021 | DF | (Kazakhstan) | Bekzhan Abdrakhman | Kyran | Undisclosed | |
| 30 August 2021 | FW | (Kazakhstan) | Pavel Kriventsov | Kyzylzhar | Undisclosed | |

=== Loans in ===
| Date from | Position | Nationality | Name | From | Date to | Ref. |
|---|---|---|---|---|---|---|
| 30 March 2021 | DF | (Belarus) | Aleksandr Chizh | Dinamo Minsk | End of season | |
| 28 July 2021 | DF | (Kazakhstan) | Kuanysh Kalmuratov | Atyrau | End of season | |

=== Out ===
| Date | Position | Nationality | Name | To | Fee | Ref. |
|---|---|---|---|---|---|---|
| 21 April 2021 | DF | (Kazakhstan) | Nurlan Dairov | Kyzylzhar | Undisclosed | |
| 15 April 2021 | DF | (Kazakhstan) | Ermek Kuantaev | Taraz | Undisclosed | |

=== Released ===
| Date | Position | Nationality | Name | Joined | Date | Ref. |
|---|---|---|---|---|---|---|
| 29 July 2021 | FW | (Turkmenistan) | Wahyt Orazsähedow | | | |

== Competitions ==
=== Overview ===
| Competition | First match | Last match | Starting round | Final position | Record | | | | | | | |
| Competition | First match | Last match | Starting round | Final position | Pld | W | D | L | GF | GA | GD | Win % |
|---|---|---|---|---|---|---|---|---|---|---|---|---|
| Premier League | 14 March 2021 | 29 October 2021 | Matchday 1 | 12th | 26 | 5 | 11 | 10 | 22 | 40 | −18 | 19.23 |
| Kazakhstan Cup | 11 July 2021 | 14 August 2021 | Group stage | Group stage | 6 | 2 | 0 | 4 | 5 | 11 | −6 | 33.33 |
| Total | | | | | 32 | 7 | 11 | 14 | 27 | 51 | −24 | 21.88 |

Last updated: 30 October 2021
Source: Competitions

=== Premier League ===
==== Results summary ====
| Overall | | | | | | | | Home | | | | | | Away | | | | | |
| Pld | W | D | L | GF | GA | GD | Pts | W | D | L | GF | GA | GD | W | D | L | GF | GA | GD |
|---|---|---|---|---|---|---|---|---|---|---|---|---|---|---|---|---|---|---|---|
| 26 | 5 | 11 | 10 | 22 | 40 | −18 | 26 | 1 | 5 | 7 | 11 | 22 | −11 | 4 | 6 | 3 | 11 | 18 | −7 |

Last updated: 30 October 2021.
Source: See Results

==== Results by round ====
| Round | 1 | 2 | 3 | 4 | 5 | 6 | 7 | 8 | 9 | 10 | 11 | 12 | 13 | 14 | 15 | 16 | 17 | 18 | 19 | 20 | 21 | 22 | 23 | 24 | 25 | 26 |
|---|---|---|---|---|---|---|---|---|---|---|---|---|---|---|---|---|---|---|---|---|---|---|---|---|---|---|
| Ground | H | A | H | A | H | H | A | H | A | H | A | H | A | H | A | H | A | A | H | A | H | A | H | A | H | A |
| Result | D | L | D | L | L | D | L | L | W | W | W | L | W | L | D | L | D | D | L | D | D | W | D | D | L | D |
| Position | 5 | 9 | 10 | 11 | 11 | 12 | 13 | 13 | 13 | 11 | 11 | 11 | 10 | 10 | 11 | 11 | 11 | 11 | 11 | 12 | 12 | 12 | 12 | 12 | 12 | 12 |

Source: See Results
A = Away; H = Home; W = Win; D = Draw; L = Loss

==== Results ====
| 13 March 2021 1 | Turan | 2 – 2 | Astana | Turkistan |
| 17:00 (UTC+6) | Nuserbayev 18'; A.Mukhamed (yellow card) 36'; Adams (yellow card) 41'; M.Tolebek 68' | Report | Tomasov 9'; Šimunović (yellow card) 44'; Beisebekov 54'; S.Smajlagić (yellow card) 61'; S.Sovet (yellow card) 88' | Stadium: Turkistan Arena; Attendance: 1,000; Referee: Aydin Rakhimbaev |

| 20 March 2021 2 | Zhetysu | 3 – 0 | Turan | Taldıqorğan |
| 14:00 (UTC+6) | Dmitrijev 4'; A.Adil (yellow card) 53' (goal) 68'; A.Baltabekov 76' | Report | B.Alipbekov (yellow card) 84' | Stadium: Zhetysu Stadium; Attendance: 0 Referee: Alexander Zatula |
Note: Match played behind closed doors due to the COVID-19 pandemic in Kazakhstan.

| 4 April 2021 3 | Turan | 1 – 1 | Kaisar | Turkistan |
| 18:00 (UTC+6) | Janković (yellow card) 62'; Kerimzhanov (yellow card) 85'; T.Amirov 90' | Report | Kenesov (yellow card) 62' (goal) 90+3'; Čađenović (yellow card) 63' | Stadium: Turkistan Arena; Attendance: 2,000; Referee: Rustam Omarov |

| 10 April 2021 4 | Kairat | 5 – 1 | Turan | Almaty |
| 17:00 (UTC+6) | Abiken 2', 30'; Hovhannisyan 5'; Mikanović (yellow card) 12'; Kanté (yellow card) 33' (goal) 43'; Eseola 90+1' | Report | Janković (red card) 38'; B.Beysenov (yellow card) 60'; T.Amirov (yellow card) 82'; K.Taipov 90' | Stadium: Central Stadium; Attendance: 0 Referee: Bulat Sariev |
Note: Match played behind closed doors due to the COVID-19 pandemic in Kazakhstan.

| 13 April 2021 5 | Turan | 0 – 1 | Taraz | Turkistan |
| 20:00 (UTC+6) | B.Beysenov (yellow card) 7'; Nuserbayev (yellow card) 88' | Report | Eugénio 77'; A.Zhumabek (yellow card) 90+2' | Stadium: Turkistan Arena; Attendance: 1,400; Referee: Sergey Nozhenko |

| 19 April 2021 6 | Turan | 2 – 2 | Caspiy | Turkistan |
| 19:00 (UTC+6) | T.Amirov (yellow card) 50'; Stanley 60', 67' | Report | A.Nusip 31'; Karayev (yellow card) 81' (goal) 84' | Stadium: Turkistan Arena; Attendance: 0 Referee: Bolat Karlibaev |
Note: Match played behind closed doors due to the COVID-19 pandemic in Kazakhstan.

| 23 April 2021 7 | Tobol | 5 – 0 | Turan | Kostanay |
| 19:00 (UTC+6) | Nikolić 8', 63'; Nurgaliev 44' (pen.); Miroshnichenko 76'; Z.Zhumashev 84' | Report | T.Amirov (yellow card) 13' | Stadium: Central Stadium; Attendance: 600; Referee: Sergey Gorokhovodatsky |

| 28 April 2021 8 | Turan | 1 – 2 | Atyrau | Turkistan |
| 20:00 (UTC+6) | Kerimzhanov (yellow card) 45+1' (goal) 45+2' | Report | Guz 2'; Gian 79' (pen.) | Stadium: Turkistan Arena; Attendance: 1,000; Referee: Bulat Sariev |

| 3 May 2021 9 | Ordabasy | 0 – 1 | Turan | Shymkent |
| 18:00 (UTC+6) | Simčević (yellow card) 28'; B.Kairov (red card) 79' | Report | Kerimzhanov (yellow card) 17'; B.Beysenov (yellow card) 22'; T.Amirov 30'; A.Mukhamed (yellow card) 59' | Stadium: Kazhymukan Munaitpasov Stadium; Attendance: 0 Referee: Aidyn Rakhimbaev |
Note: Match played behind closed doors due to the COVID-19 pandemic in Kazakhstan.

| 9 May 2021 10 | Turan | 1 – 0 | Kyzylzhar | Turkistan |
| 20:00 (UTC+6) | N.Buribayev (yellow card) 88'; Živković 90+2' (pen.); A.Mukhamed (yellow card) 90+3' | Report | Koné (yellow card) 56'; D.Shmidt (yellow card) 57'; R.Esimov (yellow card) 90+1' | Stadium: Turkistan Arena; Attendance: 1,200; Referee: Sayat Karabaev |

| 14 May 2021 11 | Shakhter Karagandy | 0 – 1 | Turan | Nur-Sultan |
| 14:00 (UTC+6) | Najaryan (yellow card) 12' | Report | Nuserbayev 20' (pen.) (yellow card) 48'; A.Pasechenko (yellow card) 90+4' | Stadium: Astana Arena; Attendance: 0 Referee: Anton Kuchma |
Note: Match played at the Astana Arena in Nur-Sultan instead of Shakhter's regular Shakhter Stadium in Karaganda. Match played behind closed doors due to the COVID-19 pandemic in Kazakhstan.

| 18 May 2021 12 | Turan | 0 – 2 | Akzhayik | Turkistan |
| 18:00 (UTC+6) | Janković (yellow card) 40'; Adams (yellow card) 68'; B.Beysenov (yellow card) 90+1' | Report | Takulov (yellow card) 60'; Kovtalyuk 72', 75' (pen.) | Stadium: Turkistan Arena; Attendance: 1,400; Referee: Rustam Omarov |

| 23 May 2021 13 | Aktobe | 0 – 2 | Turan | Aktobe |
| 21:00 (UTC+6) | | Report | S.Maksymkhan 22'; K.Taipov (yellow card) 44'; Nuserbayev 51' | Stadium: Central Stadium; Attendance: 1,900; Referee: Sergey Gorokhovodatsky |

| 28 May 2021 14 | Turan | 0 – 2 | Zhetysu | Turkistan |
| 20:00 (UTC+6) | Zaleski (yellow card) 20'; Adams (yellow card) 58' (yellow-red card) 74'; A.Mukhamed (yellow card) 60'; Kerimzhanov (yellow card) 90+5' | Report | N.Nurbol 51'; Zhaksylykov 64' (pen.); M.Khaseyn (yellow card) 83' | Stadium: Turkistan Arena; Attendance: 1,400; Referee: Raul Jalilov |

| 13 June 2021 15 | Kaisar | 0 – 0 | Turan | Kyzylorda |
| 21:00 (UTC+6) | Bitang (yellow card) 26' | Report | | Stadium: Gani Muratbayev Stadium; Attendance: 1,400; Referee: Grigory Moskovchenko |

| 19 June 2021 16 | Turan | 0 – 3 | Kairat | Turkistan |
| 21:00 (UTC+6) | B.Beysenov (yellow card) 38'; Janković (yellow card) 68' | Report | Vágner Love 13' (pen.); Kosović (yellow card) 45+1'; Palyakow (yellow card) 45+3'; A.Shushenachev 47'; A.Buranchiev 75' | Stadium: Turkistan Arena; Attendance: 1,400; Referee: Bayimbet Saken |

| 23 June 2021 17 | Taraz | 1 – 1 | Turan | Taraz |
| 20:00 (UTC+6) | Akhmetov (yellow card) 31'; Shakhmetov (yellow card) 42'; Adamović (yellow card) 83'; Kozhamberdi 87' (yellow card) 88' | Report | T.Amirov 70'; Zaleski (yellow card) 79'; M.Tolebek (yellow card) 85'; Nuserbayev (yellow card) 88' (yellow-red card) 90+7' | Stadium: Central Stadium; Attendance: 3,000; Referee: Alexander Zatula |

| 28 June 2021 18 | Caspiy | 0 – 0 | Turan | Aktau |
| 20:00 (UTC+6) | Tigroudja (yellow card) 34'; Darabayev (yellow card) 81' | Report | An.Zaleski (yellow card) 90+6' | Stadium: Zhastar Stadium; Attendance: 1,000; Referee: Sergey Nozhenko |

| 3 July 2021 19 | Turan | 2 – 4 | Tobol | Turkistan |
| 21:00 (UTC+6) | T.Amirov 16' (yellow card) 27'; Kerimzhanov (yellow card) 63'; A.Abbas (yellow card) 68'; Malyi 76' (o.g.) | Report | Kerimzhanov 33' (o.g.); Nurgaliev 56' (pen.); Malyi 84'; Lobjanidze 87' | Stadium: Turkistan Arena; Attendance: 1,100; Referee: Denis Izmailov |

| 11 September 2021 20 | Atyrau | 2 – 2 | Turan | Atyrau |
| 18:00 (UTC+6) | Stojković (yellow card) 4' (goal) 41'; Bryan 81' | Report | Chizh 20' (yellow card) 69'; Zaleski (yellow card) 32'; Fazli 72' | Stadium: Munaishy Stadium; Attendance: 0 Referee: Denis Izmailov |
Note: Match played behind closed doors due to the COVID-19 pandemic in Kazakhstan.

| 18 September 2021 21 | Turan | 1 – 1 | Ordabasy | Turkistan |
| 20:00 (UTC+6) | Fazli (yellow card) 15'; Kerimzhanov (yellow card) 23'; Živković 35' (pen.) (penalty missed) 66'; Chizh (yellow card) 57'; Musabekov (yellow card) 70'; Stanley (yellow card) 79' | Report | Simčević (yellow card) 34'; Diakate (yellow card) 65'; Rakhimov (yellow card) 74' (goal) 90+4' | Stadium: Turkistan Arena; Attendance: 1,200; Referee: Sayat Karabayev |

| 26 September 2021 22 | Kyzylzhar | 0 – 1 | Turan | Petropavl |
| 16:00 (UTC+6) | Koné (yellow card) 63' | Report | T.Amirov (yellow card) 60'; Fazli (yellow card) 62'; N.Dairov 76' (o.g.); Kerimzhanov (yellow card) 90+4' | Stadium: Karasai Stadium; Attendance: 1,500; Referee: Danil Gorda |

| 2 October 2021 22 | Turan | 0 – 0 | Shakhter Karagandy | Turkistan |
| 19:00 (UTC+6) | T.Amirov (yellow card) 25'; Nuserbayev (yellow card) 64' | Report | Graf (yellow card) 61'; Shikavka (yellow card) 88' | Stadium: Turkistan Arena; Attendance: 800; Referee: Rustam Omarov |

| 16 October 2021 24 | Akzhayik | 1 – 1 | Turan | Oral |
| 15:00 (UTC+6) | Tapalov (yellow card) 15'; Shustikov (yellow card) 23'; Gashchenkov 30' | Report | Chizh (yellow card) 56'; T.Amirov (yellow card) 64'; Deobald 72'; A.Mukhamed (yellow card) 80' | Stadium: Petr Atoyan Stadium; Attendance: 1,200; Referee: Artem Kuchin |

| 24 October 2021 25 | Turan | 1 – 2 | Aktobe | Turkistan |
| 15:00 (UTC+6) | Chizh (yellow card) 2'; T.Amirov 36' (yellow card) 69'; Živković (yellow card) 90+3' | Report | Moukam 18'; R.Temirkhan (yellow card) 62'; Balashov 66'; Žulpa (yellow card) 76' | Stadium: Turkistan Arena; Attendance: 250; Referee: Denis Izmailov |

| 30 October 2021 26 | Astana | 1 – 1 | Turan | Nur-Sultan |
| 16:00 (UTC+6) | Ebong 11' (yellow card) 74'; Ciupercă (red card) 78' | Report | Janković (yellow card) 14'; Kozubayev (yellow card) 58'; K.Kalmuratov (yellow card) 72'; A.Pasechenko (yellow card) 78'; Nuserbayev (yellow card) 78' (goal) 79' | Stadium: Astana Arena; Attendance: 2,000; Referee: Artem Kuchin |

==== League table ====
| Pos | Team | Pld | W | D | L | GF | GA | GD | Pts | Qualification or relegation |
|---|---|---|---|---|---|---|---|---|---|---|
| 10 | Taraz | 26 | 7 | 8 | 11 | 27 | 34 | −7 | 29 | |
| 11 | Atyrau | 26 | 7 | 7 | 12 | 25 | 40 | −15 | 28 | |
| 12 | Turan | 26 | 5 | 11 | 10 | 22 | 40 | −18 | 26 | |
| 13 | Kaisar (R) | 26 | 4 | 7 | 15 | 24 | 44 | −20 | 19 | Relegation to the Kazakhstan First Division |
| 14 | Zhetysu (Note: Zhetysu had three points deducted on 10 March 2021 as a punishment for the unavailability of their nominated reserve stadium for their second match-day fixture.) (R) | 26 | 5 | 4 | 17 | 23 | 47 | −24 | 16 | Relegation to the Kazakhstan First Division |

Source: UEFA, Soccerway
Rules for classification: 1) Points; 2) Goal difference; 3) Matches won; 4) Goals scored; 5) Away goals scored; 6) Head-to-head points; 7) Head-to-head matches won; 8) Head-to-head goal difference; 9) Head-to-head goals scored; 10) Head-to-head away goals scored; 11) Draw.
(R) Relegated

=== Kazakhstan Cup ===
==== Group stage ====
| Pos | Team | Pld | W | D | L | GF | GA | GD | Pts | Qualification |
|---|---|---|---|---|---|---|---|---|---|---|
| 1 | Caspiy (A) | 6 | 4 | 1 | 1 | 10 | 4 | +6 | 13 | Advanced to Quarterfinals |
| 2 | Kairat (A) | 6 | 3 | 0 | 3 | 11 | 9 | +2 | 9 | Advanced to Quarterfinals |
| 3 | Zhetysu | 6 | 2 | 1 | 3 | 3 | 5 | −2 | 7 | |
| 4 | Turan | 6 | 2 | 0 | 4 | 5 | 11 | −6 | 6 | |

Updated to match(es) played on 15 August 2021. Source: PFLK
(A) Advance to a further round

| 11 July 2021 1 | Caspiy | 4 – 0 | Turan | Aktau |
| 20:00 (UTC+6) | Bondarenko (yellow card) 6'; Mingazow 26', 34'; Karimov 42'; B.Kabylan 80'; W.Sahli (yellow card) 90+1' | Report | Stojanović (yellow card) 31'; N.Buribayev (yellow card) 83'; Adams (yellow card) 89' | Stadium: Zhastar Stadium; Attendance: 0 Referee: Sayat Karabaev |
Note: Match played behind closed doors.

| 18 July 2021 2 | Turan | 0 – 2 | Zhetysu | Turkistan |
| 21:00 (UTC+6) | Stanley (yellow card) 52'; T.Amirov (yellow card) 80' | Report | Dmitrijev 8'; Kalpachuk (yellow card) 32'; N.Nurbergen (yellow card) 75'; D.Kalybaev (yellow card) 81'; A.Adil 90+3' | Stadium: Turkistan Arena; Attendance: 1,400; Referee: Sergey Gorokhovodatsky |

| 24 July 2021 3 | Kairat | 0 – 1 | Turan | Almaty |
| 19:00 (UTC+6) | A.Ulshin (yellow card) 24'; Seydakhmet (yellow card) 34' | Report | Chizh (yellow card) 38'; Stanley 68'; Zaleski (yellow card) 90+5' | Stadium: Central Stadium; Attendance: 1,5000; Referee: Danil Gorda |

| 31 July 2021 4 | Turan | 4 – 3 | Kairat | Turkistan |
| 20:00 (UTC+6) | A.Buranchiev (yellow card) 6'; A.Shushenachev 12'; Alykulov 14'; A.Ulshin 19'; M.Omatay (yellow card) 83' | Report | M.Tolebek (yellow card) 41' (goal) 53'; D.Omarov 57'; Stanley 66', 86'; Musabekov (yellow card) 71' | Stadium: Turkistan Arena; Attendance: 0 Referee: Elvira Nurmustafina |
Note: Match played behind closed doors due to the COVID-19 pandemic in Kazakhstan.

| 8 August 2021 5 | Turan | 0 – 1 | Caspiy | Turkistan |
| 21:00 (UTC+6) | G.Nazarov (yellow card) 80' | Report | T.Kusyapov 28'; M.Taykenov (yellow card) 80' | Stadium: Turkistan Arena; Attendance: 0 Referee: Artem Kuchin |
Note: Match played behind closed doors due to the COVID-19 pandemic in Kazakhstan.

| 14 August 2021 6 | Zhetysu | 1 – 0 | Turan | Taldıqorğan |
| 18:00 (UTC+6) | A.Mikhaylov 8'; A.Baltabekov (yellow card) 44'; R.Atykhanov (yellow card) 47' | Report | Zaleski (yellow card) 79' | Stadium: Zhetysu Stadium; Attendance: 0 Referee: Alexander Gauser |
Note: Match played behind closed doors due to the COVID-19 pandemic in Kazakhstan.

== Squad statistics ==
As of match played 30 October 2021

=== Appearances and goals ===
| No. | Pos | Nat | Player | Total | | Premier League | | Kazakhstan Cup | |
| No. | Pos | Nat | Player | Apps | Goals | Apps | Goals | Apps | Goals |
|---|---|---|---|---|---|---|---|---|---|
| 1 | GK | (Kazakhstan) KAZ | Stanislav Pavlov | 5 | 0 | 2 | 0 | 3 | 0 |
| 2 | DF | (Russia) RUS | Layonel Adams | 17 | 0 | 13+2 | 0 | 2 | 0 |
| 3 | DF | (Kyrgyzstan) KGZ | Tamirlan Kozubayev | 1 | 0 | 1 | 0 | 0 | 0 |
| 4 | MF | (Ukraine) UKR | Yevhen Smirnov | 11 | 0 | 4+5 | 0 | 2 | 0 |
| 5 | MF | (Kazakhstan) KAZ | Bekzhan Alipbekov | 9 | 0 | 1+4 | 0 | 2+2 | 0 |
| 6 | DF | (Kazakhstan) KAZ | Gafurzhan Nazarov | 4 | 0 | 0 | 0 | 2+2 | 0 |
| 7 | MF | (Kazakhstan) KAZ | Shynbolat Maksymkhan | 19 | 1 | 13+1 | 1 | 4+1 | 0 |
| 8 | MF | (Kazakhstan) KAZ | Bekzat Beysenov | 17 | 0 | 9+7 | 0 | 1 | 0 |
| 9 | FW | (Kazakhstan) KAZ | Temirlan Amirov | 29 | 5 | 18+6 | 5 | 5 | 0 |
| 10 | FW | (Kazakhstan) KAZ | Tanat Nuserbayev | 21 | 4 | 15+4 | 4 | 2 | 0 |
| 11 | MF | (Kazakhstan) KAZ | Asylzhan Abbas | 11 | 0 | 1+9 | 0 | 1 | 0 |
| 14 | MF | (Montenegro) MNE | Branislav Janković | 25 | 0 | 21+1 | 0 | 2+1 | 0 |
| 15 | DF | (Kazakhstan) KAZ | Kasymzhan Taipov | 12 | 1 | 6+6 | 1 | 0 | 0 |
| 17 | MF | (Kazakhstan) KAZ | Mardan Tolebek | 12 | 2 | 4+6 | 1 | 1+1 | 1 |
| 18 | MF | (Kazakhstan) KAZ | Bakdaulet Akbergen | 1 | 0 | 0+1 | 0 | 0 | 0 |
| 19 | FW | (Kazakhstan) KAZ | Aliyar Mukhamed | 23 | 0 | 5+15 | 0 | 0+3 | 0 |
| 20 | GK | (Kazakhstan) KAZ | Andrey Pasechenko | 27 | 0 | 24 | 0 | 3 | 0 |
| 22 | DF | (Serbia) SRB | Stefan Živković | 30 | 2 | 23+1 | 2 | 6 | 0 |
| 23 | MF | (Kazakhstan) KAZ | Nurgaini Buribayev | 17 | 0 | 8+5 | 0 | 4 | 0 |
| 24 | MF | (Serbia) SRB | Milan Stojanović | 16 | 0 | 6+6 | 0 | 1+3 | 0 |
| 25 | DF | (Belarus) BLR | Aleksandr Chizh | 18 | 1 | 10+3 | 1 | 4+1 | 0 |
| 26 | DF | (Kazakhstan) KAZ | Olzhas Kerimzhanov | 24 | 1 | 22 | 1 | 2 | 0 |
| 29 | MF | (Kyrgyzstan) KGZ | Farhat Musabekov | 11 | 0 | 7 | 0 | 4 | 0 |
| 31 | DF | (Belarus) BLR | Andrey Zaleski | 29 | 0 | 24 | 0 | 5 | 0 |
| 47 | MF | (Kazakhstan) KAZ | Nurzhigit Smatov | 2 | 0 | 0+1 | 0 | 1 | 0 |
| 57 | MF | (Russia) RUS | Pavel Deobald | 23 | 1 | 14+6 | 1 | 2+1 | 0 |
| 69 | MF | (Russia) RUS | Nikita Bocharov | 20 | 0 | 18+2 | 0 | 0 | 0 |
| 70 | MF | (Kazakhstan) KAZ | Dinmukhammed Omarov | 4 | 1 | 0+1 | 0 | 0+3 | 1 |
| 71 | MF | (Kazakhstan) KAZ | Ghani Suleimen | 7 | 0 | 0+2 | 0 | 0+5 | 0 |
| 77 | DF | (Kazakhstan) KAZ | Kuanysh Kalmuratov | 6 | 0 | 1+2 | 0 | 0+3 | 0 |
| 78 | FW | (Kazakhstan) KAZ | Pavel Kriventsov | 4 | 0 | 2+2 | 0 | 0 | 0 |
| 89 | MF | (Ukraine) UKR | Yevhen Chumak | 7 | 0 | 2+2 | 0 | 3 | 0 |
| 95 | FW | (North Macedonia) MKD | Samir Fazli | 5 | 1 | 5 | 1 | 0 | 0 |
| 99 | FW | (Nigeria) NGA | Stanley | 22 | 5 | 8+9 | 2 | 4+1 | 3 |
Players away from Turan on loan:
Players who left Turan during the season:
| 3 | DF | (Kazakhstan) KAZ | Nurlan Dairov | 2 | 0 | 1+1 | 0 | 0 | 0 |

=== Goal scorers ===
| Place | Position | Nation | Number | Name | Premier League | Kazakhstan Cup | Total |
|---|---|---|---|---|---|---|---|
| 1 | FW | (Kazakhstan) | 9 | Temirlan Amirov | 5 | 0 | 5 |
| 1 | FW | (Nigeria) | 99 | Stanley | 2 | 3 | 5 |
| 3 | MF | (Kazakhstan) | 10 | Tanat Nuserbayev | 4 | 0 | 4 |
| 4 | DF | (Serbia) | 22 | Stefan Živković | 2 | 0 | 2 |
| 4 | MF | (Kazakhstan) | 17 | Mardan Tolebek | 1 | 1 | 2 |
| 4 | | | | Own goal | 2 | 0 | 2 |
| 7 | MF | (Kazakhstan) | 15 | Kasym Taipov | 1 | 0 | 1 |
| 7 | DF | (Kazakhstan) | 26 | Olzhas Kerimzhanov | 1 | 0 | 1 |
| 7 | MF | (Kazakhstan) | 7 | Shynbolat Maksymkhan | 1 | 0 | 1 |
| 7 | MF | (Kazakhstan) | 70 | Dinmukhammed Omarov | 1 | 0 | 1 |
| 7 | DF | (Belarus) | 25 | Aleksandr Chizh | 1 | 0 | 1 |
| 7 | FW | (North Macedonia) | 95 | Samir Fazli | 1 | 0 | 1 |
| 7 | MF | (Russia) | 57 | Pavel Deobald | 1 | 0 | 1 |
| | | | | TOTALS | 22 | 5 | 27 |

=== Clean sheets ===
| Place | Position | Nation | Number | Name | Premier League | Kazakhstan Cup | Total |
|---|---|---|---|---|---|---|---|
| 1 | GK | (Kazakhstan) | 20 | Andrey Pasechenko | 8 | 0 | 8 |
| 2 | GK | (Kazakhstan) | 1 | Stanislav Pavlov | 0 | 1 | 1 |
| | | | | TOTALS | 8 | 1 | 9 |

=== Disciplinary record ===
| Number | Nation | Position | Name | Premier League | | Kazakhstan Cup | | Total | |
| Number | Nation | Position | Name | Booked | Sent off (straight red) | Booked | Sent off (straight red) | Booked | Sent off (straight red) |
| 2 | (Russia) | DF | Layonel Adams | 4 | 1 | 1 | 0 | 5 | 1 |
| 3 | (Kyrgyzstan) | DF | Tamirlan Kozubayev | 1 | 0 | 0 | 0 | 1 | 0 |
| 5 | (Kazakhstan) | MF | Bekzhan Alipbekov | 1 | 0 | 0 | 0 | 1 | 0 |
| 6 | (Kazakhstan) | DF | Gafurzhan Nazarov | 0 | 0 | 1 | 0 | 1 | 0 |
| 8 | (Kazakhstan) | MF | Bekzat Beysenov | 5 | 0 | 0 | 0 | 5 | 0 |
| 9 | (Kazakhstan) | FW | Temirlan Amirov | 8 | 0 | 1 | 0 | 9 | 0 |
| 10 | (Kazakhstan) | FW | Tanat Nuserbayev | 6 | 1 | 0 | 0 | 6 | 1 |
| 11 | (Kazakhstan) | FW | Asylzhan Abbas | 1 | 0 | 0 | 0 | 1 | 0 |
| 14 | (Montenegro) | MF | Branislav Janković | 4 | 1 | 0 | 0 | 4 | 1 |
| 15 | (Kazakhstan) | DF | Kasymzhan Taipov | 1 | 0 | 0 | 0 | 1 | 0 |
| 17 | (Kazakhstan) | MF | Mardan Tolebek | 1 | 0 | 1 | 0 | 2 | 0 |
| 19 | (Kazakhstan) | FW | Aliyar Mukhamed | 5 | 0 | 0 | 0 | 5 | 0 |
| 20 | (Kazakhstan) | GK | Andrey Pasechenko | 2 | 0 | 0 | 0 | 2 | 0 |
| 22 | (Serbia) | DF | Stefan Živković | 1 | 0 | 0 | 0 | 1 | 0 |
| 23 | (Kazakhstan) | MF | Nurgaini Buribayev | 1 | 0 | 1 | 0 | 2 | 0 |
| 24 | (Serbia) | MF | Milan Stojanović | 0 | 0 | 1 | 0 | 1 | 0 |
| 25 | (Belarus) | DF | Aleksandr Chizh | 4 | 0 | 1 | 0 | 5 | 0 |
| 26 | (Kazakhstan) | DF | Olzhas Kerimzhanov | 7 | 0 | 0 | 0 | 7 | 0 |
| 29 | (Kyrgyzstan) | MF | Farhat Musabekov | 1 | 0 | 1 | 0 | 2 | 0 |
| 31 | (Belarus) | DF | Andrey Zaleski | 4 | 0 | 2 | 0 | 6 | 0 |
| 77 | (Kazakhstan) | DF | Kuanysh Kalmuratov | 1 | 0 | 0 | 0 | 1 | 0 |
| 95 | (North Macedonia) | FW | Samir Fazli | 2 | 0 | 0 | 0 | 2 | 0 |
| 99 | (Nigeria) | FW | Stanley | 1 | 0 | 1 | 0 | 2 | 0 |
Players who left Turan during the season:
| | | | TOTALS | 61 | 3 | 11 | 0 | 72 | 3 |
