= 2020 FC Istiklol season =

FC Istiklol
2020 season
- President: Shohruh Saidov
- Manager: Mubin Ergashev Interim (until 17 February); Vitaliy Levchenko (from 17 February)
- Stadium: Republican Stadium
- Tajik League: 1st
- Tajikistan Cup: Quarterfinal vs Ravshan Kulob
- Super Cup: Champions
- AFC Champions League: Playoff Round vs Al-Ahli
- AFC Cup: Group Stage
- Top goalscorer: League: Manuchekhr Dzhalilov (16); All: Manuchekhr Dzhalilov (23)

The FC Istiklol 2020 season is Istiklol's twelfth Tajik League season, of which they are defending Tajik League and Cup Champions, whilst they will also participate in the Tajik Supercup and AFC Champions League.

== Season events ==
On 14 February 2020, Istiklol announced that Shahrom Samiyev had left the club to join Rubin Kazan on a free transfer.

After Mubin Ergashev took charge of Istiklol for their two AFC Champions League matches, Vitaliy Levchenko was appointed as the club's new manager on 17 February, with Alisher Tukhtaev returning to an assistants role.

On 6 March, Shakhrom Sulaimonov joined Lokomotiv-Pamir on loan for the season, and Dzhamshed Rakhmonov was released by the club.

On 18 March, Istiklol's AFC Cup group games scheduled to take place in April, where postponed due to the COVID-19 pandemic.

On 27 March, the Tajikistan Football Federation announced that the opening round of games would be played behind closed doors due to the threat of the COVID-19 pandemic.

On 14 April, the AFC extended the postponement of the AFC Cup group games scheduled for May and June until further notice due to the continuing COVID-19 pandemic.

On 25 April, following Istiklol's 6–1 victory over Kuktosh, the Tajikistan Football Federation announced that all football would be suspended from the evening of 26 April until 10 May.

On 6 May, the Tajikistan Football Federation extended the suspension of football indefinitely due to the spread of COVID-19 pandemic in Tajikistan.

On 8 June, the Tajikistan Football Federation announced that the season would resume on 16 June, with the games continuing to be played without spectators. With the schedule being confirmed the follow day.

On 9 July, the Asian Football Confederation announced a revised calendar for the 2020 AFC Cup, with all the remaining games to be played in on country, that will be announced at a later date.

On 22 July, Istiklol announced the return of Akhtam Nazarov on a contract until the end of the 2021 season, whilst the following day Sharifbek Rakhmatov moved on loan to Lokomotiv-Pamir until the end of the season.

On 28 July, young midfielder Salam Ashurmamdov joined Istaravshan on loan for the remainder of the season.

On 6 August, midfielder Saidmuxtor Azimov joined Fayzkand on loan for the remainder of the season.

On 7 August, Istiklol announced the return of midfielder Amirbek Juraboev after a year playing for Navbahor Namangan, on a one-year contract.

On 31 August, Ehson Panjshanbe left Istiklol to join Navbahor Namangan.

During the 2020 Tajikistan Higher League season summer transfer window, Romish Jalilov was re-registered with Istiklol.

On 10 September, the 2020 AFC Cup was cancelled.

== Squad ==
As of match played 4 October 2020

No.	Name	Nationality	Position	Date of birth (age)	Signed from	Signed in	Contract ends	Apps.	Goals
Goalkeepers
1	Rustam Yatimov	(Tajikistan)	GK	13 July 1998 (aged 22)	Unattached	2018	2020	46	0
16	Dilshod Dodoboev	(Tajikistan)	GK	8 November 1996 (aged 23)	Istaravshan	2020		3	0
77	Nikola Stošić	(Serbia)	GK	15 March 1994 (aged 26)	Železničar Beograd	2013		141	0
Defenders
2	Marko Milić	(Serbia)	DF	6 November 1987 (aged 32)	Kokand 1912	2020		17	1
3	Tabrezi Davlatmir	(Tajikistan)	DF	6 June 1998 (aged 22)	Youth Team	2016	2020	90	1
4	Vahdat Hanonov	(Tajikistan)	DF	25 July 2000 (aged 20)	CSKA Pamir Dushanbe	2020		13	1
5	Iskandar Dzhalilov	(Tajikistan)	DF	1 June 1992 (aged 28)	Botev Vratsa	2019		54	2
6	Zoir Juraboev	(Tajikistan)	DF	16 September 1998 (aged 22)	Metallurg Bekabad	2019		46	1
20	Akhtam Nazarov	(Tajikistan)	DF	29 September 1992 (aged 28)	Bashundhara Kings	2020	2021	196	22
21	Oleksiy Larin	(Ukraine)	DF	4 June 1994 (aged 26)	Arsenal Kyiv	2019		51	2
26	Shakhzod Davlatov	(Tajikistan)	DF	18 April 2000 (aged 20)	Youth Team	2019		7	0
Midfielders
7	Viktor Svezhov	(Russia)	MF	17 May 1991 (aged 29)	Minsk	2020		11	0
10	Alisher Dzhalilov	(Tajikistan)	MF	29 August 1993 (aged 27)	Baltika Kaliningrad	2019		49	30
11	Muhammadjon Rakhimov	(Tajikistan)	MF	15 October 1998 (aged 21)	Khosilot Farkhor	2017		93	20
18	Amadoni Kamolov	(Tajikistan)	MF	16 January 2003 (aged 17)	Lokomotiv-Pamir	2020		8	0
19	Khurshed-Timur Dzhuraev	(Tajikistan)	MF	21 September 1997 (aged 23)		2019	2021	24	0
22	Amirbek Juraboev	(Tajikistan)	MF	13 April 1996 (aged 24)	Navbahor Namangan	2020	2021	105	6
88	Romish Jalilov	(Tajikistan)	MF	21 November 1995 (aged 24)		2020			
Forwards
9	Wahyt Orazsähedow	(Turkmenistan)	FW	26 January 1992 (aged 28)	Dordoi Bishkek	2020		13	5
13	Rustam Soirov	(Tajikistan)	FW	12 September 2002 (aged 18)	Lokomotiv Pamir	2020		20	10
14	Sheriddin Boboev	(Tajikistan)	FW	21 April 1999 (aged 21)	Youth Team	2016		92	53
63	Manuchekhr Dzhalilov	(Tajikistan)	FW	27 September 1990 (aged 30)	Persebaya Surabaya	2020		113	109
Youth team players
	Amir Nigmatov	(Tajikistan)	DF	28 April 1999 (aged 21)	Youth Team	2018		2	0
	Shahbol Rajabov	(Tajikistan)	DF	4 January 2000 (aged 20)	Youth Team	2018		1	0
	Farhod Kosimov	(Tajikistan)	MF	18 September 2000 (aged 20)	Youth Team	2018		9	0
Away on loan
20	Salam Ashurmamadov	(Tajikistan)	MF	18 March 2003 (aged 17)	Youth Team	2019	2021	5	1
22	Sharifbek Rakhmatov	(Tajikistan)	MF	1 September 2002 (aged 18)	Youth Team	2020		1	0
25	Saidmuxtor Azimov	(Tajikistan)	MF	9 June 2000 (aged 20)	Barkchi	2019		9	0
70	Shakhrom Sulaimonov	(Tajikistan)	MF	27 June 1997 (aged 23)	Utenis Utena	2018		39	2
Left during the season
17	Ehson Panjshanbe	(Tajikistan)	MF	12 May 1999 (aged 21)	Youth Team	2016	2020	100	19
23	Shahrom Samiyev	(Tajikistan)	FW	8 February 2001 (aged 19)	CSKA Pamir Dushanbe	2019		29	11
27	Dzhamshed Rakhmonov	(Russia)	DF	9 April 1997 (aged 23)		2019	2021	12	0

=== Out on loan ===
Note: Flags indicate national team as defined under FIFA eligibility rules; some limited exceptions apply. Players may hold more than one non-FIFA nationality.

No.	Pos.	Nation	Player
20	MF	TJK	Salam Ashurmamdov (at Istaravshan)
22	MF	TJK	Sharifbek Rakhmatov (at Lokomotiv Pamir)

No.	Pos.	Nation	Player
25	MF	TJK	Saidmuxtor Azimov (at Fayzkand)
70	MF	TJK	Shakhrom Sulaimonov (at Lokomotiv Pamir)

== Transfers ==
=== In ===
Date	Position	Nationality	Name	From	Fee	Ref.
January 2020	GK	(Tajikistan)	Dilshod Dodoboev	Istaravshan	Free	
January 2020	DF	(Serbia)	Marko Milić	Kokand 1912	Free	
January 2020	DF	(Tajikistan)	Vahdat Hanonov	CSKA Pamir Dushanbe	Free	
January 2020	MF	(Russia)	Viktor Svezhov	Minsk	Free	
January 2020	FW	(Tajikistan)	Amadoni Kamolov	Lokomotiv Pamir	Free	
January 2020	FW	(Tajikistan)	Manuchekhr Dzhalilov	Persebaya Surabaya	Free	
January 2020	FW	(Tajikistan)	Rustam Soirov	Lokomotiv Pamir	Free	
February 2020	FW	(Turkmenistan)	Wahyt Orazsähedow	Dordoi Bishkek	Free	
22 July 2020	DF	(Tajikistan)	Akhtam Nazarov	Bashundhara Kings	Free	
7 August 2020	MF	(Tajikistan)	Amirbek Juraboev	Navbahor Namangan	Undisclosed	
Summer 2020	MF	(Tajikistan)	Romish Jalilov		Free	

=== Out ===
Date	Position	Nationality	Name	To	Fee	Ref.
14 February 2020	FW	(Tajikistan)	Shahrom Samiyev	Rubin Kazan	Free	
31 August 2020	MF	(Tajikistan)	Ehson Panjshanbe	Navbahor Namangan	Undisclosed	

=== Loans out ===
Date	Position	Nationality	Name	To	Fee	Ref.
6 March 2020	MF	(Tajikistan)	Shakhrom Sulaimonov	Lokomotiv Pamir	End of Season	
23 July 2020	MF	(Tajikistan)	Sharifbek Rakhmatov	Lokomotiv Pamir	End of Season	
28 July 2020	MF	(Tajikistan)	Salam Ashurmamdov	Istaravshan	End of Season	
6 August 2020	MF	(Tajikistan)	Saidmuxtor Azimov	Fayzkand	End of Season	

=== Released ===
Date	Position	Nationality	Name	Joined	Date	Ref.
6 March 2020	DF	(Russia)	Dzhamshed Rakhmonov			
31 December 2020	GK	(Serbia)	Nikola Stošić	Železničar Beograd		
31 December 2020	DF	(Serbia)	Marko Milić	Buxoro	9 February 2021	
31 December 2020	MF	(Russia)	Viktor Svezhov	KAMAZ	3 February 2021	
31 December 2020	FW	(Turkmenistan)	Wahyt Orazsähedow	Turan	11 May 2021	
31 December 2020	GK	(Tajikistan)	Dilshod Dodoboev	Eskhata		
31 December 2020	DF	(Tajikistan)	Shakhzod Davlatov	Dushanbe-83		
31 December 2020	FW	(Tajikistan)	Farhod Kosimov	Dushanbe-83		

=== Trial ===
Date From	Position	Nationality	Name	Last club	Date To	Ref.
January 2020	MF	(Uzbekistan)	Eldor Boymatov	Surkhon Termez		
January 2020	FW	(Tajikistan)	Manuchekhr Dzhalilov	Persebaya Surabaya		
January 2020	FW	(Uzbekistan)	Shakhboz Erkinov	Kokand 1912		
February 2020	DF	(Tajikistan)	Vahdat Hanonov	CSKA Pamir Dushanbe		
February 2020	FW	(Turkmenistan)	Wahyt Orazsähedow	Dordoi Bishkek		

== Friendlies ==
9 January 2020	Kokand 1912 (Uzbekistan)	2–1	(Tajikistan) Istiklol	Tashkent, Uzbekistan
13:00 (UTC+5)	O.Khaidarov 21'; J.Khasanov 82'; J.Akhmedov (yellow card)	Report	M.Dzhalilov 8'; A.Dzhalilov (yellow card); I.Dzhalilov (yellow card)	Stadium: Dustlik Stadium; Referee: Bobur Khaidarov

14 January 2020	Pakhtakor Tashkent (Uzbekistan)	–	(Tajikistan) Istiklol	Tashkent, Uzbekistan
14:00 (UTC+5)
Note: Match was originally scheduled for 13 January, postponed to 14 January, and then cancelled due to bad weather conditions.

14 February 2020	Istiklol	4–0	CSKA Pamir Dushanbe	Dushanbe
10:00 (UTC+5)	Juraboev 29'; Orazsähedow 36' (pen.); M.Dzhalilov 71', 81'; Davlatmir (yellow card)	Report		Stadium: Pamir Stadium; Referee: Behruz Murtazoev

20 February 2020	Istiklol (Tajikistan)	0–1	(China) Zhejiang Greentown	Antalya, Turkey
20:00 (UTC+5)	Yatimov (yellow card); S.Azimov (yellow card); Milić (yellow card)	Report	Ndlovu (penalty missed) 45+1' 45+1'; Song (yellow card); Guo (yellow card)	Stadium: Papillon Sports Centre; Referee: Ulku Gursel

22 February 2020	Istiklol (Tajikistan)	1–0	(Kazakhstan) Shakhter Karagandy	Antalya, Turkey
18:30 (UTC+5)	I.Dzhalilov 50'; K.Dzhuraev (yellow card); A.Dzhalilov (yellow card); Davlatmir (yellow card); Milić (yellow card)	Report		Stadium: S&B Sport Sports Complex; Referee: Anton Lashuk

25 February 2020	Istiklol (Tajikistan)	0–5	(Ukraine) Inhulets Petrove	Antalya, Turkey
17:00 (UTC+5)	A.Dzhalilov (penalty missed) 38' (yellow card) (yellow-red card) 76'; M., Dzhalilov (red card) 42'; Davlatmir (yellow card) (yellow-red card) 73'	Report	Korobka (red card) 42'; Kovalenko 57'; Kovalyov 67' (pen.); Sichinava 75', 87', 90'; Pavlov (yellow card); Schedryi (yellow card); Bartulović (yellow card)

29 February 2020	Istiklol (Tajikistan)	0–0	(Belarus) Slutsk	Antalya, Turkey
(UTC+5)	K.Dzhuraev (yellow card) (yellow-red card) 53'; Panjshanbe (yellow card); Davlatmir (yellow card); S.Azimov (yellow card)	Report	Takulov (yellow card) (yellow-red card) 53'; Anyukevich (yellow card); Koanda (yellow card)	Referee: Dmitry Markov (Belarus)

10 June 2020	Istiklol	1–1	CSKA Pamir Dushanbe	Dushanbe
(UTC+5)	Soirov 52'; Larin (yellow card); K.Dzhuraev (yellow card); S.Ashurmamadov (yellow card)	Report	S.Gafforoa 60' (yellow card); K.Mirzohon (yellow card); A.Karomatullozoda (yellow card)	Stadium: FFT Academy; Attendance: 0 Referee: Behruz Murtazoev

== TFF Cup ==
=== Preliminary round ===
Pos	Team	Pld	W	D	L	GF	GA	GD	Pts	Qualification
1	(Tajikistan) Istiklol	3	3	0	0	18	0	+18	9	
2	(Tajikistan) Lokomotiv Pamir	3	2	0	1	15	5	+10	6	Advance to Finals Stage
3	(Tajikistan) Kuktosh Rudaki	3	1	0	2	9	4	+5	3	Advance to Finals Stage
4	(Tajikistan) Shohmansur	2	0	0	2	1	34	−33	0	

Updated to match(es) played on 8 February 2020. Source:

1 February 2020 1	Istiklol	13–0	Shohmansur	Dushanbe
11:00 (UTC+5)	S.Ashurmamadov 3', 54'; S.Azimov 18', 27' (pen.); Juraboev 32'; D.Rakhmonov (penalty missed) 29' 45+1'; Z.Fuzaylov 48'; Soirov 62', 77' (yellow card); Panjshanbe 73'; K-T.Dzhuraev 75', 85'; Svezhov 87'	Report	F.Ikromov (red card) 40'; M.Safarov (yellow card); F.Tabarukov (yellow card)	Stadium: Pamir Stadium; Attendance: 200; Referee: Amirjon Khorkashev

5 February 2020 2	Istiklol	4–0	Lokomotiv Pamir	Dushanbe
13:00 (UTC+5)	Boboev 20'; Erkinov 21'; Davlatmir 29', 35' (yellow card); Rakhimov (yellow card); Svezhov (yellow card); Z.Fuzaylov (yellow card)	Report	E.Ahmadhon (yellow card)	Stadium: Pamir Stadium; Attendance: 200; Referee: Gulmurodi Sadullo

8 February 2020 3	Istiklol	1–0	Kuktosh Rudaki	Dushanbe
14:00 (UTC+5)	Erkinov 71'; Z.Fuzaylov (yellow card); Boboev (yellow card); Larin (yellow card); Milić (red card) 69'	Report	B.Shodiev (yellow card); F.Karayev (yellow card); O.Safarov (yellow card) (yellow-red card) 63'	Stadium: Pamir Stadium; Referee: Behruz Murtazoev

== Competitions ==
=== Tajik Supercup ===
4 April 2020	Istiklol	2–1	Khujand	Dushanbe
17:00 (UTC+5)	M.Dzhalilov 77'; Rakhimov 78'; Panjshanbe (yellow card) 90+4'	Report	S.Rixsiboev 2' (yellow card) 61'; Chakalov (yellow card) 63'	Stadium: Pamir Stadium; Attendance: 0 Referee: Nasrullo Kabirov
Note: Match held behind closed doors due to the threat of the COVID-19 pandemic.

=== Tajik League ===
==== Results summary ====
Overall								Home						Away					
Pld	W	D	L	GF	GA	GD	Pts	W	D	L	GF	GA	GD	W	D	L	GF	GA	GD
18	14	3	1	61	11	+50	45	8	1	0	39	4	+35	6	2	1	22	7	+15

Last updated: 4 October 2020.
Source: See Results

==== Results by round ====
Round	1	2	3	4	5	6	7	8	9	10	11	12	13	14	15	16	17	18
Ground	H	H	H	H	A	H	A	A	H	A	H	H	A	H	A	A	A	A
Result	W	W	D	W	W	W	W	W	W	W	W	W	W	W	D	L	D	W
Position	1	1	1	1	1	1	1	1	1	1	1	1	1	1	1	1	1	1

Source: Results
A = Away; H = Home; W = Win; D = Draw; L = Loss

==== Results ====
8 April 2020 1	Istiklol	7–0	Dushanbe-83	Dushanbe
18:00 (UTC+5)	Orazsähedow 26'; M.Dzhalilov 31', 60', 64'; Panjshanbe (red card) 42'; A.Dzhalilov 46'; Boboev 80', 90'; Svezhov (yellow card); K-T.Dzhuraev (yellow card)	Report	A.Ergashev (yellow card) (red card) 42'; A.Jones (yellow card)	Stadium: Pamir Stadium; Attendance: 0 Referee: Abdullo Davlatov
Note: Match played at the Pamir Stadium in Dushanbe, rather than Dushanbe-83's regular Central Stadium in Dushanbe. Match played behind closed doors due to the threat of the COVID-19 pandemic in Tajikistan.

12 April 2020 2	Istiklol	2–0	CSKA Pamir Dushanbe	Dushanbe
18:00 (UTC+5)	A.Dzhalilov 18'; Boboev 87' (yellow card); I.Dzhalilov (yellow card); Davlatmir (yellow card)	Report	S.Gafforov (yellow card)	Stadium: Pamir Stadium; Attendance: 0 Referee: Behruz Murtazoev
Note: Match played behind closed doors due to the threat of the COVID-19 pandemic in Tajikistan.

19 April 2020 3	Istiklol	2–2	Khatlon	Dushanbe
19:00 (UTC+5)	M.Dzhalilov 32', 90+5' (pen.); Svezhov (yellow card); K-T.Dzhuraev (yellow card); Soirov (yellow card)	Report	Parviz Baki-Akhunov 9'; Uma.Sharipov 45' (yellow card) (yellow-red card) 80'; E.Boboev (yellow card); M.Nazkov (yellow card); Saidov (yellow card)	Stadium: Pamir Stadium; Attendance: 0 Referee: Nasrullo Kabirov
Note: Match played behind closed doors due to the threat of the COVID-19 pandemic in Tajikistan.

25 April 2020 4	Istiklol	6–1	Kuktosh Rudaki	Dushanbe
17:00 (UTC+5)	M.Dzhalilov 15', 65' (yellow card); Soirov 61', 83', 90+3'; K.Nazarov 68' (o.g.); Kamolov (yellow card)	Report	K.Nazarov 81'; M.Davlatbekov (yellow card)	Stadium: Pamir Stadium; Attendance: 0 Referee: Khusravi Siddikzod
Note: Match played behind closed doors due to the threat of the COVID-19 pandemic in Tajikistan.

16 June 2020 5	Regar-TadAZ	1–6	Istiklol	Tursunzoda
17:30 (UTC+5)	O.Safarov 60'; S.Makhamadiev (yellow card)	Report	Panjshanbe 28'; Boboev 36'; A.Dzhalilov 61' (yellow card); Orazsähedow 76'; Rakhimov 78'; Soirov 87'	Stadium: TALCO Arena; Attendance: 0 Referee: Abdullo Davlatov
Note: Match originally scheduled for 3 May, but postponed on 25 April by Tajikistan Football Federation due to COVID-19 pandemic in Tajikistan.

20 June 2020 6	Istiklol	8–0	Istaravshan	Dushanbe
18:30 (UTC+5)	Boboev 14'; Larin 16'; A.Dzhalilov 50', 90'; Soirov 77'; Orazsähedow 78'; M.Dzhalilov 85'; Panjshanbe 88'; Milić (yellow card); Rakhimov (yellow card)	Report	I.Barotov (yellow card); K.Khomidov (yellow card); B.Abdurakhmonov (yellow card)	Stadium: Pamir Stadium; Attendance: 0 Referee: Behruz Murtazoev
Note: Match originally scheduled for 10 May, but postponed on 6 May by Tajikistan Football Federation due to COVID-19 pandemic in Tajikistan.

28 June 2020 7	Khujand	1–3	Istiklol	Khujand
17:30 (UTC+5)	S.Rixsiboev 3'; K.Mirzonazhod (yellow card); Choriyev (yellow card); Chakalov (yellow card); Safarov (red card) 86'	Report	M.Dzhalilov 16'; A.Dzhalilov 76' (yellow card); Orazsähedow 90+1'; Svezhov (yellow card); Milić (yellow card)	Stadium: 20 Years of Independence Stadium; Attendance: 0 Referee: Nasrullo Kabirov
Note: Match originally scheduled for 17 May, but postponed on 6 May by Tajikistan Football Federation due to COVID-19 pandemic in Tajikistan.

4 July 2020 8	Fayzkand	0–4	Istiklol	Hulbuk
17:30 (UTC+5)	F.Safarzoda (yellow card); D.Barotov (yellow card)	Report	M.Dzhalilov 20'; Boboev 24' (yellow card); A.Dzhalilov 29', 43'; Soirov (yellow card); Rakhimov (yellow card)	Stadium: Central Stadium; Attendance: 0 Referee: Nasim Khamidov
Note: Match originally scheduled for 23 May, but postponed on 6 May by Tajikistan Football Federation due to COVID-19 pandemic in Tajikistan.

12 July 2020 9	Istiklol	1–0	Lokomotiv-Pamir	Dushanbe
18:30 (UTC+5)	Soirov 44'; Davlatmir (yellow card); Panjshanbe (yellow card)	Report	E.Ahmadhon (yellow card)	Stadium: Pamir Stadium; Attendance: 0 Referee: Sayedzhon Zainiddinov
Note: Match originally scheduled for 31 May, but postponed on 6 May by Tajikistan Football Federation due to COVID-19 pandemic in Tajikistan.

8 August 2020 10	Lokomotiv-Pamir	0–3	Istiklol	Kuktosh
17:00 (UTC+5)	Asrorov (yellow card)	Report	A.Dzhalilov 8', 45'; Panjshanbe 35'; M.Dzhalilov (yellow card); K-T.Dzhuraev (yellow card)	Stadium: Oilfield stadium Referee: Abdullo Davlatov
Note: Match played at the Oilfield stadium in Kuktosh, instead of Lokomotiv-Pamir's regular Lokomotiv Stadium in Dushanbe.

12 August 2020 11	Istiklol	3–0	Fayzkand	Dushanbe
17:00 (UTC+5)	Rakhimov 24'; M.Dzhalilov 52', 69'; Hanonov (yellow card); Soirov (yellow card)	Report	V.Safarov (yellow card); H.Gulmurod (yellow card); S.Azimov (yellow card); M.Sadykov (yellow card)	Stadium: Pamir Stadium; Referee: Khurshed Dadaboev

15 August 2020 12	Istiklol	4–0	Khujand	Dushanbe
17:00 (UTC+5)	M.Dzhalilov 32' (yellow card); Rakhimov 48' (yellow card); A.Dzhalilov 59'; Davlatmir 78'; A.Juraboev (yellow card); Hanonov (yellow card)	Report	P.Bokiev (yellow card); D.Bozorov (yellow card); S.Khamrayev (yellow card)	Stadium: Pamir Stadium; Referee: Sayyodzhon Zainiddinov

24 August 2020 13	Istaravshan	1–2	Istiklol	Istaravshan
17:00 (UTC+5)	S.Ashurmamdov 23'; A.Kodirov (yellow card); A.Kurbonov (yellow card); B.Abdurakhmonov (yellow card); K.Khomidov (yellow card); Karimov (yellow card)	Report	M.Dzhalilov (penalty missed) 41' (yellow card); Panjshanbe 58' (pen.); Soirov 89'; Davlatmir (yellow card); Nazarov (yellow card)	Stadium: Istaravshan Arena; Referee: Abdullo Davlatov

8 September 2020 14	Istiklol	6–1	Regar-TadAZ	Dushanbe
18:30 (UTC+5)	Boboev 5', 17', 34', 68'; Rakhimov 9'; A.Juraboev (red card) 40'; A.Dzhalilov 83'; K-T.Dzhuraev (yellow card)	Report	S.Makhmadiev 48' (yellow card)	Stadium: Pamir Stadium; Referee: Behruz Murtazoev

20 September 2020 16	Khatlon	1–1	Istiklol	Bokhtar
16:00 (UTC+5)	Saidov 47' (pen.) (yellow card); M.Naskov (yellow card); Nurmatov (yellow card)	Report	Soirov 45+2' (yellow card); Milić (yellow card); A.Dzhalilov (yellow card)	Stadium: Tsentralnyi Stadium; Referee: Abdullo Davlatov

27 September 2020 17	CSKA Pamir Dushanbe	1–0	Istiklol	Dushanbe
16:30 (UTC+5)	M.Davlatbekov 40'; K.Sheraliev (yellow card); A.Karomatullozoda (yellow card); I.Ponomarenko (yellow card)	Report	Z.Juraboev (red card) 74'	Stadium: CSKA Stadium; Referee: Nasim Khamidov

30 September 2020 15	Kuktosh Rudaki	1–1	Istiklol	Kuktosh
15:30 (UTC+5)	D.Yodgorov 70'; M.Abdugafforov (yellow card); M.Odilov (yellow card); A.Sultonov (yellow card); K.Nazarov (yellow card); M.Rakhmonov (yellow card); H.Rasulov (yellow card)	Report	Dzhalilov 16' (pen.); I.Dzhalilov (yellow card); Soirov (yellow card); Hanonov (yellow card); K-T.Dzhuraev (yellow card)	Stadium: Oilfield stadium Referee: Khurshed Dadoboev

4 October 2020 18	Dushanbe-83	1–2	Istiklol	Vahdat
15:30 (UTC+5)	A.Jones 38'; A.Navruzov (yellow card)	Report	M.Dzhalilov 74', 83'; A.Juraboev (yellow card)	Stadium: Central Stadium; Referee: Nasrullo Kabirov

==== League table ====
Pos	Team	Pld	W	D	L	GF	GA	GD	Pts	Qualification or relegation
1	Istiklol (C)	18	14	3	1	61	11	+50	45	Qualification for AFC Champions League group stage
2	Khujand	18	11	2	5	30	23	+7	35	Qualification for AFC Cup group stage
3	CSKA Pamir	18	8	5	5	29	25	+4	29	
4	Kuktosh	18	7	7	4	30	24	+6	28	
5	Khatlon	18	6	8	4	27	24	+3	26	

Updated to match(es) played on 4 October 2020. Source: FFT
Rules for classification: 1) Points; 2) Head-to-head points; 3) Head-to-head goal difference; 4) Head-to-head goals scored; 5) Goal difference; 6) Goals scored.
(C) Champions

=== Tajikistan Cup ===
3 August 2020 Last 16	Istiklol	11–0	Mohir	Dushanbe
18:30 (UTC+5)	M.Dzhalilov 5', 18', 25' (pen.), 30'; Orazsähedow 31'; Panjshanbe 63'; Boboev 66', 86'; A.Dzhalilov 68'; Hanonov 73'; Soirov 81'	Report		Stadium: Pamir Stadium; Attendance: 0 Referee: Nasim Khamidov

13 September 2020 Quarterfinal	Ravshan Kulob	4–2 (a.e.t.)	Istiklol	Kulob
16:00 (UTC+5)	Rustamov 8', 90+2' (yellow card); N.Rustamov 92' (yellow card); A.Nozimov 113'; D.Cholov (yellow card); A.Farrukhzod (yellow card); S.Karimov (yellow card); S.Saydakhmad (yellow card); Z.Abdulkhayrov (yellow card)	Report	Nazarov (penalty missed) 17'; Milić 38'; Soirov 60'; Jalilov (yellow card)	Stadium: Central Stadium; Attendance: 0 Referee: Sayyodzhon Zainiddinov

=== AFC Champions League ===
==== Qualifying stage ====
21 January 2019 Preliminary round 2	Lokomotiv Tashkent (Uzbekistan)	0–1	(Tajikistan) Istiklol	Tashkent, Uzbekistan
15:00 (UTC+5)	Khashimov (yellow card) 37'	Report	A.Dzhalilov 60'; Juraboev (yellow card) 90+1'	Stadium: Lokomotiv Stadium; Attendance: 4,256; Referee: Hussein Abo Yahya (Lebanon)

28 January 2019 Play-off round	Al-Ahli (Saudi Arabia)	1–0	(Tajikistan) Istiklol	Jeddah, Saudi Arabia
20:30 (UTC+5)	Belaïli 90+1' (pen.)	Report	Rakhimov (yellow card) 35'; Milić (yellow card) 45+1'; Svezhov (yellow card) 57' (red card) 89'; A.Dzhalilov (yellow card) 63'; Davlatmir (yellow card) 90'	Stadium: King Abdullah Sports City; Referee: Sivakorn Pu-udom (Thailand)

=== AFC Cup ===
==== Group stage ====
Pos	Team	Pld	W	D	L	GF	GA	GD	Pts
1	(Tajikistan) Istiklol	1	1	0	0	2	0	+2	3
2	(Turkmenistan) Altyn Asyr	0	0	0	0	0	0	0	0
3	(Kyrgyzstan) Dordoi	0	0	0	0	0	0	0	0
4	(Tajikistan) Khujand	1	0	0	1	0	2	−2	0

Source: AFC
Rules for classification: Tiebreakers

11 March 2020 1	Istiklol (Tajikistan)	2–0	(Tajikistan) Khujand	Dushanbe, Tajikistan
18:00 (UTC+5)	M.Dzhalilov 21', 29' (pen.); A.Dzhalilov (yellow card) 60'; K.Dzhuraev (yellow card) 83'	Report	S.Khamrayev (yellow card) 29'; M.Komroni (yellow card) 49'; Choriyev (yellow card) 87'	Stadium: Pamir Stadium; Attendance: 0 Referee: Ahmad Al-Ali (Kuwait)
Note: The match between FC Istiklol and FK Khujand in Dushanbe was played behind closed doors due to the COVID-19 pandemic.

23 October 2020 2	Altyn Asyr (Turkmenistan)	–	(Tajikistan) Istiklol	TBC
(UTC+5)		Report		Stadium: TBC
Note: Match originally scheduled for 15 April, but postponed on 18 March due to the COVID-19 pandemic. Match rearranged on 9 July, before being cancelled on 10 September.

26 October 2020 3	Istiklol (Tajikistan)	–	(Kyrgyzstan) Dordoi	TBC
(UTC+5)		Report		Stadium: TBC
Note: Match originally scheduled for 29 April, but postponed on 18 March due to the COVID-19 pandemic. Match rearranged on 9 July, before being cancelled on 10 September.

29 October 2020 4	Dordoi (Kyrgyzstan)	–	(Tajikistan) Istiklol	TBC
(UTC+5)		Report		Stadium: TBC
Note: Match originally scheduled for 13 May, but postponed on 18 March due to the COVID-19 pandemic. Match rearranged on 9 July, before being cancelled on 10 September.

1 November 2020 5	Khujand (Tajikistan)	–	(Tajikistan) Istiklol	TBC
(UTC+5)		Report		Stadium: TBC
Note: Match originally scheduled for 27 May, but postponed on 18 March due to the COVID-19 pandemic. Match rearranged on 9 July, before being cancelled on 10 September.

4 November 2020 6	Istiklol (Tajikistan)	–	(Turkmenistan) Altyn Asyr	TBC
(UTC+5)		Report		Stadium: TBC
Note: Match originally scheduled for 17 June, but postponed on 18 March due to the COVID-19 pandemic. Match rearranged on 9 July, before being cancelled on 10 September.

== Squad statistics ==
As of match played 4 October 2020

=== Appearances and goals ===
No.	Pos	Nat	Player	Total		Tajik League		Tajikistan Cup		Super Cup		AFC Champions League		AFC Cup	
No.	Pos	Nat	Player	Apps	Goals	Apps	Goals	Apps	Goals	Apps	Goals	Apps	Goals	Apps	Goals
1	GK	(Tajikistan) TJK	Rustam Yatimov	22	0	17	0	1	0	1	0	2	0	1	0
2	DF	(Serbia) SRB	Marko Milić	17	1	11+1	0	1	1	1	0	2	0	1	0
3	DF	(Tajikistan) TJK	Tabrezi Davlatmir	24	1	18	1	2	0	1	0	2	0	1	0
4	DF	(Tajikistan) TJK	Vahdat Hanonov	13	1	6+5	0	2	1	0	0	0	0	0	0
5	DF	(Tajikistan) TJK	Iskandar Dzhalilov	21	0	13+3	0	2	0	1	0	1	0	1	0
6	DF	(Tajikistan) TJK	Zoir Juraboev	21	0	11+4	0	2	0	1	0	2	0	1	0
7	MF	(Russia) RUS	Viktor Svezhov	11	0	8	0	0	0	1	0	2	0	0	0
9	FW	(Turkmenistan) TKM	Wahyt Orazsähedow	13	5	3+7	4	1	1	0+1	0	0	0	0+1	0
10	MF	(Tajikistan) TJK	Alisher Dzhalilov	22	14	17	12	1	1	1	0	2	1	1	0
11	MF	(Tajikistan) TJK	Muhammadjon Rakhimov	23	5	7+10	4	1+1	0	0+1	1	1+1	0	0+1	0
13	FW	(Tajikistan) TJK	Rustam Soirov	20	10	5+11	8	1+1	2	0+1	0	0	0	0+1	0
14	FW	(Tajikistan) TJK	Sheriddin Boboev	22	12	12+5	10	0+1	2	1	0	2	0	1	0
16	GK	(Tajikistan) TJK	Dilshod Dodoboev	3	0	1+1	0	1	0	0	0	0	0	0	0
18	MF	(Tajikistan) TJK	Amadoni Kamolov	8	0	0+7	0	0+1	0	0	0	0	0	0	0
19	MF	(Tajikistan) TJK	Khurshed-Timur Dzhuraev	13	0	7+3	0	1+1	0	0	0	0	0	1	0
20	DF	(Tajikistan) TJK	Akhtam Nazarov	11	0	8+1	0	1+1	0	0	0	0	0	0	0
21	DF	(Ukraine) UKR	Oleksiy Larin	23	1	17	1	2	0	1	0	2	0	1	0
22	MF	(Tajikistan) TJK	Amirbek Juraboev	7	0	7	0	0	0	0	0	0	0	0	0
63	FW	(Tajikistan) TJK	Manuchekhr Dzhalilov	22	23	17	16	1	4	1	1	2	0	1	2
88	MF	(Tajikistan) TJK	Romish Jalilov	6	0	2+3	0	1	0	0	0	0	0	0	0
Youth team players:
Players away from Istiklol on loan:
22	MF	(Tajikistan) TJK	Sharifbek Rakhmatov	1	0	0+1	0	0	0	0	0	0	0	0	0
Players who left Istiklol during the season:
17	MF	(Tajikistan) TJK	Ehson Panjshanbe	16	5	11	4	1	1	1	0	2	0	1	0

=== Goal scorers ===
Place	Position	Nation	Number	Name	Tajik League	Tajikistan Cup	Super Cup	AFC Champions League	AFC Cup	Total
1	FW	(Tajikistan)	63	Manuchekhr Dzhalilov	16	4	1	0	2	23
2	MF	(Tajikistan)	10	Alisher Dzhalilov	12	1	0	1	0	14
3	FW	(Tajikistan)	14	Sheriddin Boboev	10	2	0	0	0	12
4	FW	(Tajikistan)	13	Rustam Soirov	8	2	0	0	0	10
5	FW	(Turkmenistan)	9	Wahyt Orazsähedow	4	1	0	0	0	5
5	MF	(Tajikistan)	17	Ehson Panjshanbe	4	1	0	0	0	5
5	MF	(Tajikistan)	11	Muhammadjon Rakhimov	4	0	1	0	0	5
8	DF	(Ukraine)	21	Oleksiy Larin	1	0	0	0	0	1
8	DF	(Tajikistan)	3	Tabrezi Davlatmir	1	0	0	0	0	1
8	DF	(Tajikistan)	4	Vahdat Hanonov	0	1	0	0	0	1
8	DF	(Serbia)	2	Marko Milić	0	1	0	0	0	1
8				Own goal	1	0	0	0	0	1
				TOTALS	61	13	2	1	2	79

=== Clean sheets ===
Place	Position	Nation	Number	Name	Tajik League	Tajikistan Cup	Super Cup	AFC Champions League	AFC Cup	Total
1	GK	(Tajikistan)	1	Rustam Yatimov	8	0	0	1	1	10
2	GK	(Tajikistan)	16	Dilshod Dodoboev	0	1	0	0	0	1
TOTALS					8	1	0	1	1	11

=== Disciplinary record ===
Number	Nation	Position	Name	Tajik League		Tajikistan Cup		Super Cup		AFC Champions League		AFC Cup		Total	
Number	Nation	Position	Name	Booked	Sent off (straight red)	Booked	Sent off (straight red)	Booked	Sent off (straight red)	Booked	Sent off (straight red)	Booked	Sent off (straight red)	Booked	Sent off (straight red)
2	(Serbia)	DF	Marko Milić	3	0	0	0	0	0	1	0	0	0	4	0
3	(Tajikistan)	DF	Tabrezi Davlatmir	3	0	0	0	0	0	1	0	0	0	4	0
4	(Tajikistan)	DF	Vahdat Hanonov	3	0	0	0	0	0	0	0	0	0	3	0
5	(Tajikistan)	DF	Iskandar Dzhalilov	2	0	0	0	0	0	0	0	0	0	2	0
6	(Tajikistan)	DF	Zoir Juraboev	0	1	0	0	0	0	1	0	0	0	1	1
7	(Tajikistan)	MF	Viktor Svezhov	3	0	0	0	0	0	1	1	0	0	4	1
10	(Tajikistan)	MF	Alisher Dzhalilov	3	0	0	0	0	0	1	0	1	0	5	0
11	(Tajikistan)	MF	Muhammadjon Rakhimov	3	0	0	0	0	0	1	0	0	0	4	0
13	(Tajikistan)	FW	Rustam Soirov	5	0	0	0	0	0	0	0	0	0	5	0
14	(Tajikistan)	FW	Sheriddin Boboev	2	0	0	0	0	0	0	0	0	0	2	0
18	(Tajikistan)	MF	Amadoni Kamolov	1	0	0	0	0	0	0	0	0	0	1	0
19	(Tajikistan)	MF	Khurshed-Timur Dzhuraev	5	0	0	0	0	0	0	0	1	0	6	0
20	(Tajikistan)	DF	Akhtam Nazarov	1	0	0	0	0	0	0	0	0	0	1	0
22	(Tajikistan)	MF	Amirbek Juraboev	2	1	0	0	0	0	0	0	0	0	2	1
63	(Tajikistan)	FW	Manuchekhr Dzhalilov	4	0	0	0	0	0	0	0	0	0	4	0
88	(Tajikistan)	MF	Romish Jalilov	0	0	1	0	0	0	0	0	0	0	1	0
Players who left Istiklol during the season:
17	(Tajikistan)	MF	Ehson Panjshanbe	1	1	0	0	1	0	0	0	0	0	2	1
			TOTALS	41	3	1	0	2	0	6	1	2	0	52	4
