= Branislav Jankovic =

Branislav Jankovic may refer to:

- Branislav Jankovič (born 1991), Slovak ice hockey player
- Branislav Janković (born 1992), Montenegrin footballer
