= Zoir Dzhuraboyev =

Tajikistani footballer

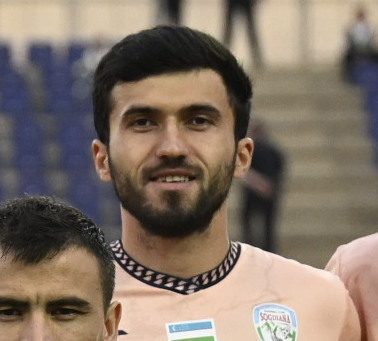

Personal information
- Full name: Zoir Murodulloyevich Dzhuraboyev
- Date of birth: 16 September 1998 (age 28)
- Place of birth: Dushanbe, Tajikistan
- Height: 1.84 m (6 ft 0 in)
- Position: Defender

Team information
- Current team: Sogdiana
- Number: 2

Senior career*
Years	Team	Apps	(Gls)
2016	Barki Tajik		
2017–2018	CSKA Pamir Dushanbe	21	(3)
2018	Metallurg Bekabad	6	(0)
2019–2022	Istiklol	58	(4)
2022	Surkhon	16	(1)
2023–2024	Neftchi Fergana	45	(1)
2025–	Sogdiana	38	(3)

International career
2016–	Tajikistan	60	(2)
- * Club domestic league appearances and goals as of 2 July 2026

Zoir Murodulloyevich Dzhuraboyev (Tajik: ‌Зоир Муродуллоевич Ҷӯрабоев, Russian: Зоир Муродуллоевич Джурабоев), born 16 September 1998) is a Tajik professional footballer who plays for Sogdiana and the Tajikistan national football team.

== Career ==
=== Club ===
In July 2018, Dzhuraboyev moved to Uzbekistan Super League club Metallurg Bekabad.

On 26 February 2022, Istiklol announced that Dzhuraboyev had left the club to join Surkhon in the Uzbekistan Super League.

On 23 December 2024, Dzhuraboyev joined Sogdiana.

== Career statistics ==
=== Club ===
As of match played 2 May 2026

Appearances and goals by club, season and competition
Club	Season	League			National Cup		Continental		Other		Total	
Club	Season	Division	Apps	Goals	Apps	Goals	Apps	Goals	Apps	Goals	Apps	Goals
Metallurg Bekabad	2018	Uzbekistan Super League	6	0	0	0	–		–		6	0
Istiklol	2019	Tajikistan Higher League	18	1	7	0	0	0	0	0	25	1
Istiklol	2020	Tajikistan Higher League	15	0	2	0	3	0	1	0	21	0
Istiklol	2021	Tajikistan Higher League	25	3	5	1	6	0	1	0	37	4
Istiklol	Total		58	4	14	1	9	0	2	0	83	5
Surkhon	2022	Uzbekistan Super League	16	1	2	0	–		–		16	1
Neftchi Fergana	2023	Uzbekistan Super League	25	1	1	0	–		–		26	1
Neftchi Fergana	2024	Uzbekistan Super League	20	0	1	0	–		–		21	0
Neftchi Fergana	Total		45	1	2	0	-	-	-	-	47	1
Sogdiana	2025	Uzbekistan Super League	27	2	3	1	–		–		30	3
Sogdiana	2026	Uzbekistan Super League	11	1	0	0	–		–		11	1
Sogdiana	Total		38	3	3	1	-	-	-	-	41	4
Career total			163	9	21	2	9	0	2	0	195	11

=== International ===
Tajikistan national team
Year	Apps	Goals
2016	1	0
2017	0	0
2018	3	0
2019	4	0
2020	3	1
2021	4	0
2022	8	0
2023	9	0
2024	15	0
2025	10	1
2026	3	0
Total	60	2

Statistics accurate as of match played 9 June 2026

=== International goals ===
Scores and results list Tajikistan's goal tally first.

#	Date	Venue	Opponent	Score	Result	Competition
1.	3 September 2020	Lokomotiv Stadium, Tashkent, Uzbekistan	Uzbekistan	1–1	1–2	Friendly
2.	4 September 2025	Hisor Central Stadium, Hisor, Tajikistan	Iran	2–2	2–2	2025 CAFA Nations Cup

== Honors ==
Istiklol

- Tajik League: 2019, 2020, 2021
- Tajik Cup: 2019,
- Tajik Supercup: 2020, 2021

Tajikistan

- King's Cup: 2022
