= 2019 Kyrgyz Premier League =

Kyrgyz Premier League
- Season: 2019
- Champions: FC Dordoi Bishkek
- Top goalscorer: Wahyt Orazsähedow

The 2019 Keurgeuz Premier Ligaseu (Kyrgyz: 2019 Кыргыз Премьер Лигасы) or 2019 Kyrgyz Premier League was the 28th season of the Kyrgyz Premier League, Kyrgyzstan's top division of association football organized by the Football Federation of Kyrgyz Republic. The season started on 6 April 2019, with eight teams participating.

Starting from the 2019 season, the league was rebranded as the Kyrgyz Premier League.

== Teams ==
Locations of teams in the 2019 Kyrgyz Premier League

Note: Table lists in alphabetical order.

| Team | Location | Venue | Capacity | Manager | Captain |
|---|---|---|---|---|---|
| Abdysh-Ata Kant | Kant | Stadion Sportkompleks Abdysh-Ata | 3,000 | | |
| Akademija Osh | Osh | Suyumbayev Stadion | 11,200 | Khurshit Lutfullayev | |
| Alay Osh | Osh | Suyumbayev Stadion | 11,200 | | |
| Alga Bishkek | Bishkek | Dolen Omurzakov Stadium | 23,000 | | |
| Dordoi Bishkek | Bishkek | Dolen Omurzakov Stadium | 23,000 | Aleksandr Krestinin | |
| Ilbirs Bishkek | Bishkek | Stadium FC FFKR | 1,000 | | |
| Kara-Balta | Kara-Balta | Manas Stadium | 4,000 | | |
| Neftchi | Kochkor-Ata | Stadion Neftyannik Kochkor-Ata | 5,000 | | |

== League table ==
| Pos | Team | Pld | W | D | L | GF | GA | GD | Pts | Qualification or relegation |
|---|---|---|---|---|---|---|---|---|---|---|
| 1 | Dordoi Bishkek (C) | 28 | 21 | 3 | 4 | 76 | 21 | +55 | 66 | Qualification for AFC Cup group stage |
| 2 | Alay Osh | 28 | 20 | 2 | 6 | 66 | 35 | +31 | 62 | |
| 3 | Alga Bishkek | 28 | 14 | 5 | 9 | 47 | 35 | +12 | 47 | |
| 4 | Neftchi Kochkorata (Q) | 28 | 14 | 4 | 10 | 43 | 31 | +12 | 46 | Qualification for AFC Cup preliminary round 2 (Note: Neftchi Kochkorata qualified for the AFC Cup preliminary round 2 as Kyrgyzstan Cup winners.) |
| 5 | Abdysh-Ata Kant | 28 | 11 | 2 | 15 | 41 | 59 | −18 | 35 (Note: Head-to-head results: Abdysh-Ata Kant 0–3 Ilbirs Bishkek, Ilbirs Bishkek 0–1 Abdysh-Ata Kant, Abdysh-Ata Kant 7–3 Ilbirs Bishkek, Ilbirs Bishkek 0–0 Abdysh-Ata Kant.) | |
| 6 | Ilbirs Bishkek | 28 | 10 | 5 | 13 | 49 | 46 | +3 | 35 | |
| 7 | Kara-Balta | 28 | 5 | 4 | 19 | 24 | 66 | −42 | 19 | |
| 8 | Akademija Osh | 28 | 2 | 5 | 21 | 22 | 75 | −53 | 11 | |

Source: KPL
Rules for classification: 1) Points; 2) Head-to-head points; 3) Head-to-head goal difference; 4) Head-to-head goals scored; 5) Goal difference; 6) Goals scored.
(C) Champions; (Q) Qualified for the phase indicated

== Results ==
=== Matches 1-14 ===
| Home \ Away | ALA | DOR | ALG | NEF | ABD | ILB | KAR | AKA |
|---|---|---|---|---|---|---|---|---|
| Alay Osh | — | 1–2 | 2–3 | 1–0 | 1–0 | 4–3 | 6–1 | 2–1 |
| Dordoi Bishkek | 3–4 | — | 1–1 | 3–0 | 5–0 | | 3–0 | 2–1 |
| Alga Bishkek | 0–1 | 1–4 | — | 0–1 | 2–3 | 1–1 | 0–1 | 3–2 |
| Neftchi Kochkorata | 1–1 | 0–0 | 0–0 | — | 0–2 | 1–3 | 3–0 | 3–1 |
| Abdysh-Ata Kant | 0–1 | 1–4 | 0–1 | 2–1 | — | 0–3 | 2–1 | 1–2 |
| Ilbirs Bishkek | 1–3 | 2–1 | 2–1 | 0–1 | 0–1 | — | 1–0 | 1–2 |
| Kara-Balta | | 1–3 | 0–3 | 1–1 | 0–1 | 1–3 | — | 1–0 |
| Akademija Osh | 1–3 | 2–3 | 0–0 | 0–1 | 1–2 | 1–1 | 0–4 | — |

Updated to match(es) played on unknown. Source:
Legend: Blue = home team win; Yellow = draw; Red = away team win.

=== Matches 15-28 ===
| Home \ Away | ALA | DOR | ALG | NEF | ABD | ILB | KAR | AKA |
|---|---|---|---|---|---|---|---|---|
| Alay Osh | — | | 0–1 | | 6–3 | | | 3–1 |
| Dordoi Bishkek | 0–0 | — | 2–0 | | | | | 4–0 |
| Alga Bishkek | | | — | 2–0 | 4–3 | | | 4–1 |
| Neftchi Kochkorata | 3–1 | | | — | 2–1 | | 2–1 | |
| Abdysh-Ata Kant | | 0–3 | | | — | 7–3 | 5–1 | 2–1 |
| Ilbirs Bishkek | 0–1 | 5–2 | 2–2 | 2–1 | | — | | |
| Kara-Balta | 2–7 | | 2–1 | | | 2–1 | — | 0–0 |
| Akademija Osh | | | | 0–3 | | | | — |

Updated to match(es) played on unknown. Source:
Legend: Blue = home team win; Yellow = draw; Red = away team win.

== Top scorers ==
As of Match played 24 October 2019

| Rank | Player | Club | Goals |
|---|---|---|---|
| 1 | (Turkmenistan) Wahyt Orazsähedow | Dordoi Bishkek | 20 |
| 2 | (Ghana) Joel Kojo | Alay | 15 |
| 3 | (Kyrgyzstan) Ernist Batyrkanov | Dordoi Bishkek | 13 |
| 4 | (Kyrgyzstan) Maksat Alygulov | Abdysh-Ata Kant | 12 |
| 5 | (Kyrgyzstan) Kadyrbek Shaarbekov | Ilbirs Bishkek | 10 |
| 5 | (Kyrgyzstan) Elaman Mamytov | Abdysh-Ata Kant | 10 |
| 7 | (Kyrgyzstan) Mirlan Murzaev | Dordoi Bishkek | 8 |
| 8 | (Kyrgyzstan) Davlyat Baratov | Abdysh-Ata Kant | 7 |
| 8 | (Kyrgyzstan) Abai Bokoleev | Ilbirs Bishkek | 7 |
| 8 | (Kyrgyzstan) Eldar Moldojunusov | Neftchi Kochkor-Ata | 7 |
