= Marko Milić (footballer) =

Serbian footballer

Personal information
- Full name: Marko Milić
- Date of birth: 6 November 1987 (age 39)
- Place of birth: Belgrade, SFR Yugoslavia
- Height: 1.90 m (6 ft 3 in)
- Position: Centre-back

Senior career*
Years	Team	Apps	(Gls)
2005–2010	Bežanija	63	(2)
2006–2007	→ Budućnost Dobanovci (loan)	25	(2)
2011–2012	OFK Beograd	3	(0)
2012	Borac Banja Luka	0	(0)
2012	Bežanija	13	(0)
2013	Novi Pazar	7	(0)
2013	Čelik Nikšić		
2014	Timok	7	(0)
2014	Bežanija	10	(0)
2015	Zemun	6	(1)
2015–2018	Bežanija	49	(1)
2018–2019	Kokand 1912	52	(0)
2020	Istiklol	12	(0)
2021	Buxoro	0	(0)
2022	IMT	4	(0)
- * Club domestic league appearances and goals as of 14:15, 9 February 2021 (UTC)

Marko Milić (Serbian Cyrillic: Марко Милић; born 6 November 1987) is a Serbian retired footballer.

== Career ==
On 9 February 2021, FK Buxoro announced the signing of Milić.

== Career statistics ==
As of match played 20 September 2020

Club	Season	League			National Cup		Continental		Other		Total	
Club	Season	Division	Apps	Goals	Apps	Goals	Apps	Goals	Apps	Goals	Apps	Goals
Bežanija	2014–15	Serbian First League	10	0	1	0	-				11	0
Bežanija	2015–16	Serbian First League	11	0	2	0	-				13	0
Bežanija	2016–17	Serbian First League	14	1	0	0	-				14	1
Bežanija	2017–18	Serbian First League	14	0	1	0	-				15	0
Bežanija	Total		49	1	4	0	-	-	-	-	53	0
Kokand 1912	2018	Uzbekistan Super League	29	0	3	0	-				32	0
Kokand 1912	2019	Uzbekistan Super League	23	0	0	0	-				23	0
Kokand 1912	Total		52	0	3	0	-	-	-	-	55	0
Istiklol	2020	Tajikistan Higher League	12	0	1	1	3	0	1	0	17	1
Career total			113	1	8	1	3	0	1	0	125	1

== Honors ==
Istiklol

- Tajikistan Higher League (1): 2020
- Tajik Supercup (1): 2020
