= Aleksandr Chizh =

Belarusian footballer

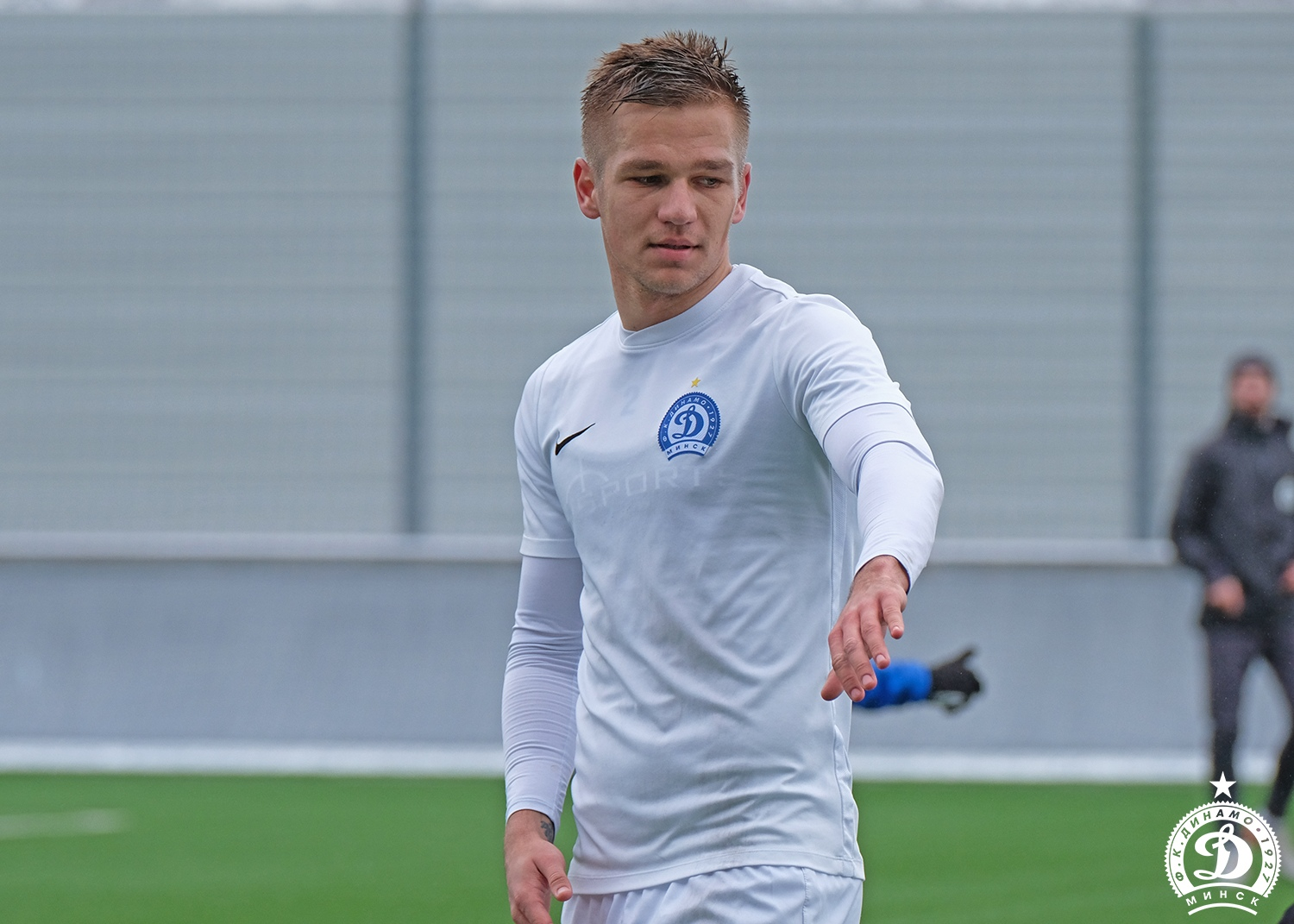

Personal information
- Date of birth: 10 February 1997 (age 29)
- Place of birth: Byaroza, Brest Oblast, Belarus
- Height: 1.85 m (6 ft 1 in)
- Position: Midfielder

Team information
- Current team: Dynamo Kirov
- Number: 27

Youth career
- 2014–2017: Dinamo Minsk

Senior career*
Years	Team	Apps	(Gls)
2017–2021	Dinamo Minsk	15	(2)
2017	→ Naftan Novopolotsk (loan)	13	(1)
2021	→ Turan (loan)	13	(1)
2022–2023	Torpedo-BelAZ Zhodino	23	(1)
2024	Slavia Mozyr	10	(0)
2024	Arsenal Dzerzhinsk	10	(0)
2025	Kyrgyzaltyn	22	(1)
2026–	Dynamo Kirov	22	(1)

International career^{‡}
2015	Belarus U19	3	(0)
2017–2018	Belarus U21	4	(0)
- * Club domestic league appearances and goals as of 15 November 2026 ‡ National team caps and goals as of 5 June 2018

Aleksandr Chizh (Belarusian: Аляксандр Чыж; Russian: Александр Чиж; born 10 February 1997) is a Belarusian professional footballer who plays for Russian club Dynamo Kirov.
