= Wahyt Orazsähedow =

Turkmenistani footballer

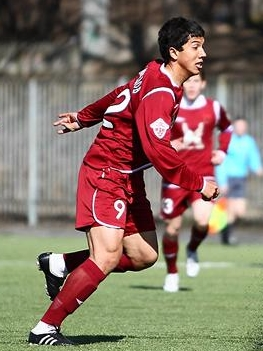

Personal information
- Full name: Wahyt Sähetmyradowiç Orazsähedow
- Date of birth: 26 January 1992 (age 34)
- Place of birth: Babarap, Turkmenistan
- Height: 1.80 m (5 ft 11 in)
- Position: Forward

Team information
- Current team: Altyn Asyr

Youth career
- 2006: Talyp sporty

Senior career*
Years	Team	Apps	(Gls)
2008–2013	Rubin	1	(0)
2012–2013	→ Neftekhimik (loan)	43	(5)
2014	→ Dacia	2	(0)
2014	Osmanlıspor	0	(0)
2015	Rostov	0	(0)
2015	MGSK Aşgabat		
2015	Aşgabat		
2016	Altyn Asyr		
2016–2018	Ahal		
2018	Sabail	10	(0)
2018	Altyn Asyr	8	(3)
2019	Dordoi Bishkek	28	(20)
2020	Istiklol	10	(4)
2021	Turan	0	(0)
2022–	Altyn Asyr		

International career^{‡}
2011	Turkmenistan U23	4	(2)
2016–	Turkmenistan	12	(5)
- * Club domestic league appearances and goals as of 2 January 2023 ‡ National team caps and goals as of 5 September 2019

Wahyt Sähetmyradowiç Orazsähedow (born 26 January 1992) is a Turkmenistani football forward who plays for Altyn Asyr and Turkmenistan.

== Personal life ==
Wahyt Orazsähedowv was born at Babarap in Ahal Region, in a large family. The elder brother, a former professional football player, played in the Ýokary Liga, the other brother is a teacher, Orazsähedow also has a sister. In childhood, he practiced karate. He started playing football at the age of six. At the age of 10 he was recognized as the best striker at the children's tournament, after which Wahyt was invited to Ashgabat's sports boarding school.

Married in December 2016, has a daughter born in 2017.

Orazsahadov watches in his free time films in the genre of comedy or thriller. He is fluent in Russian.

== Career ==
He started playing football in the Avadan Sports Club and the Children's and Youth Sports School in Ashgabat. He started his football career in FC Talyp Sporty. At the age of 12, a viewing was held in Moscow in one of the boarding sport school, Wahyt was taken, but subject to a change of citizenship, the father of the football player Sähetmyrat Orazsähedow opposed this. From the age of 14 he studied at the Kiev Youth Sports School №15, from where he transferred to the FC Rubin Kazan. At that time, Orazsähedow was 16 years old. At the end of 2007, he arrived in Kazan, where he spent two trainings as part of the FC Rubin Rubin youth team. Turkmen coach Kurban Berdyev approved the transfer of the young striker. In the first season, he scored 7 goals in 24 matches in Russian Youth championship.

=== Club ===
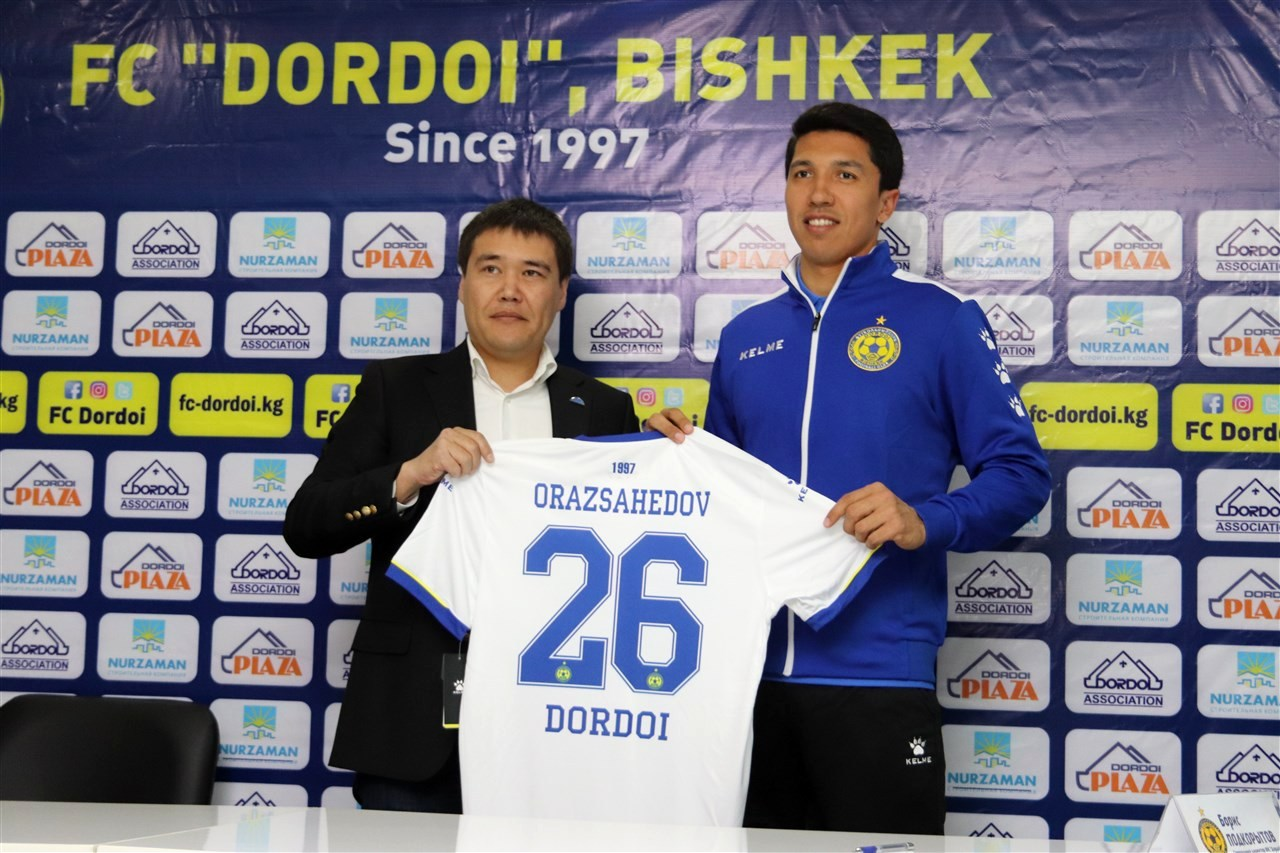
Orazsahedov joins to FC Dordoi Bishkek (Kyrgyzstan) in March 2019

Orazsähedow made his professional debut for FC Rubin Kazan on 15 July 2009 in the Russian Cup game against FC Volga Tver.

July 2012 he transferred on loan to FC Neftekhimik Nizhnekamsk. On 13 August 2012 he scored his first goal against FC Salyut Belgorod.

17 March 2014 he joined the Moldovan team FC Dacia Chișinău. In May he made his debut for his new club in a match of the 30th round against Zimbru.

On 29 August 2014 he became a player of the Turkish club Osmanlispor. For junior team played 16 matches and scored 12 goals.

On 27 February 2015 moved to FC Rostov on a free transfer.

In June 2015 it became known that Orazsähedow had returned to Turkmenistan for military service, where he was drafted into the Central Army Sports Club (MGSK) of the Armed Forces of Turkmenistan acting in the Turkmenistan First League Beginning in the third round of the 2015 Ýokary Liga playing for FC Ashgabat.

On 9 February 2018, Sabail FK announced the signing of Orazsähedow, releasing him at the end of the 2017–18 season.

On 15 February 2019, Dordoi Bishkek announced the signing of Orazsähedow. On 26 November 2019, Dordoi Bishkek announced the departure of Orazsähedow at the end of his contract.

In the winter of 2020, Orazsahedov signed a one-year contract with Tajikistani club FC Istiklol. Orazsahedov won his first trophy with the club in April 2020, the 2020 Tajik Super Cup. He made his debut in Tajikistan Higher League on 8 April 2020 in a 7–0 win against FC Dushanbe-83, scoring his first goal in the 25th minute. On 12 February 2021, Istiklol announced that Orazsahedov had left the club after his contract had expired.

On 11 May 2021, it was announced that Orazsahedov had signed for FC Turan.

== International ==
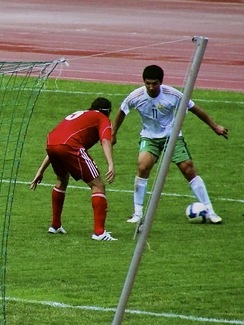

At the age of 15 years he was summoned to the Turkmenistan youth team.

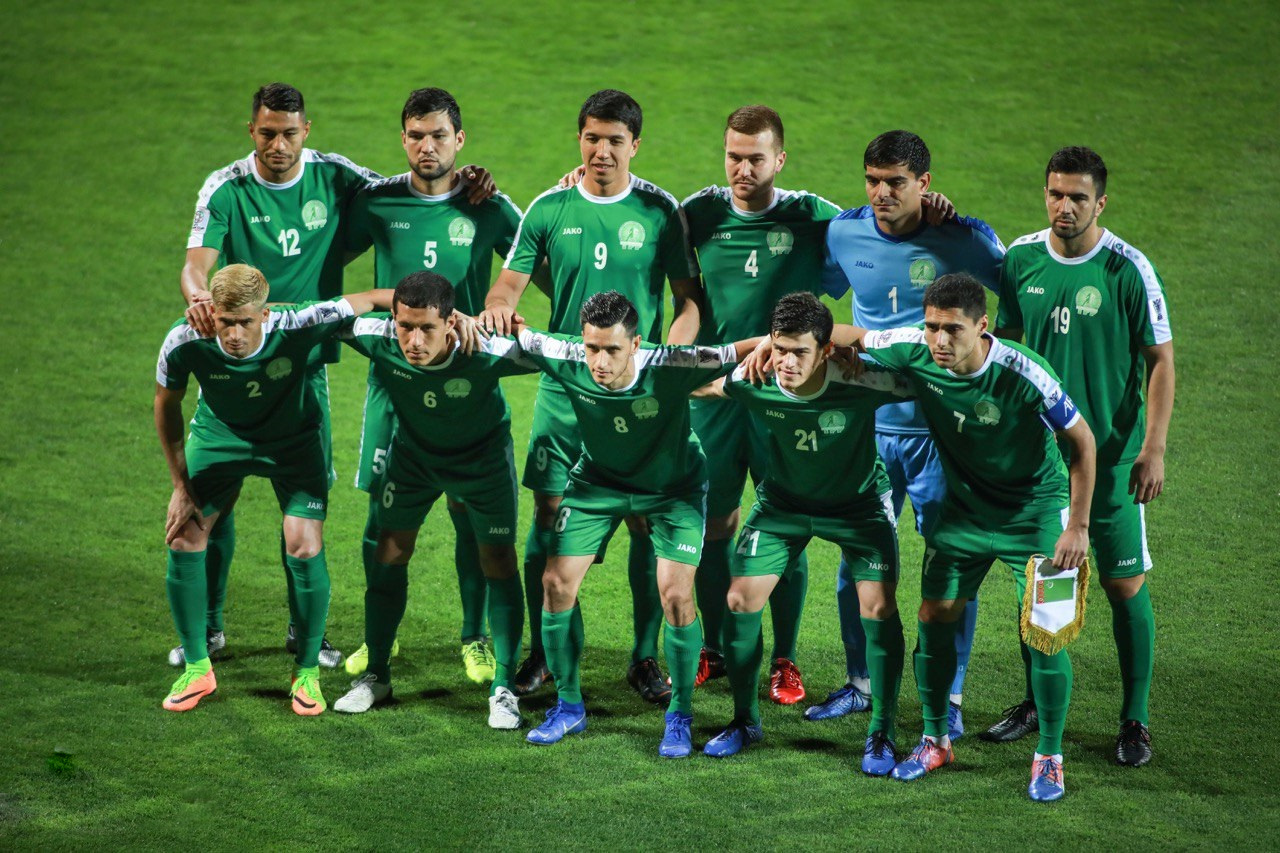
Orazsahedov with Turkmenistan team at 2019 AFC Asian Cup

In March 2011, he played in the Turkmenistan Olympic team in a match against Indonesia, Wahyt scored a goal. In June Orazsahedov played for the Olympic team full match against Syria in Jordan, scored a goal in the 2nd half, equalized his team eventually won the draw (2:2).

Orazsahedov made his senior national team debut on 11 October 2016, in a friendly match against Kyrgyzstan. He scored his first national team goal against Singapore in Asian Cup 2019 qualification match on 10 October 2017.

He has been a member of the Turkmenistan national football team since 2016. He was included in Turkmenistan's squad for the 2019 AFC Asian Cup in the United Arab Emirates.

== Career statistics ==
=== Club ===
As of match played 15 August 2020

Club	Season	League			National Cup		Continental		Other		Total	
Club	Season	Division	Apps	Goals	Apps	Goals	Apps	Goals	Apps	Goals	Apps	Goals
Rubin Kazan	2008	Russian Premier League	0	0	0	0	0	0	-		0	0
Rubin Kazan	2009	Russian Premier League	0	0	0	0	0	0	-		0	0
Rubin Kazan	2010	Russian Premier League	0	0	0	0	0	0	0	0	0	0
Rubin Kazan	2011–12	Russian Premier League	1	0	0	0	0	0	-		1	0
Rubin Kazan	2012–13	Russian Premier League	0	0	0	0	0	0	-		0	0
Rubin Kazan	2013–14	Russian Premier League	0	0	0	0	0	0	-		0	0
Rubin Kazan	Total		1	0	0	0	0	0	0	0	1	0
Neftekhimik Nizhnekamsk (loan)	2012–13	Russian Football National League	27	3	1	0	-				28	3
Neftekhimik Nizhnekamsk (loan)	2013–14	Russian Football National League	16	2	2	0	-				18	2
Neftekhimik Nizhnekamsk (loan)	Total		43	5	3	0	-	-	-	-	46	5
Dacia Chișinău (loan)	2013–14	Divizia Națională	2	0	1	0	-				3	0
Osmanlıspor	2014–15	TFF First League	0	0	0	0	-				0	0
Rostov	2013–14	Russian Premier League	0	0	0	0	-				0	0
Aşgabat	2015	Ýokary Liga					-					
Altyn Asyr	2016	Ýokary Liga					1	0			1	0
Ahal	2017	Ýokary Liga					-					
Sabail	2017–18	Azerbaijan Premier League	10	0	0	0	-				10	0
Altyn Asyr	2018	Ýokary Liga	8	3			5	5			13	8
Dordoi Bishkek	2019	Kyrgyz Premier League					6	3			6	3
Istiklol	2020	Tajikistan Higher League	10	4	1	1	1	0	1	0	13	5
Career total			74	12	5	1	13	8	1	0	93	20

=== International ===
Statistics accurate as of match played 5 September 2019

Turkmenistan
Year	Apps	Goals
2016	2	0
2017	2	2
2018	1	1
2019	4	1
Total	9	4

==== International goals ====
Scores and results list Turkmenistan's goal tally first.

No.	Date	Venue	Opponent	Score	Result	Competition
1.	10 October 2017	Köpetdag Stadium, Ashgabat, Turkmenistan	Singapore	1–0	2–1	2019 AFC Asian Cup qualification
2.	10 October 2017	Köpetdag Stadium, Ashgabat, Turkmenistan	Singapore	2–1	2–1	2019 AFC Asian Cup qualification
3.	25 December 2018	Miracle Resort Hotel Center, Antalya, Turkey	Afghanistan	1–0	2–0	Friendly
4.	5 September 2019	Colombo Racecourse, Colombo, Sri Lanka	Sri Lanka	1–0	2–0	2022 FIFA World Cup qualification
5.	14 November 2019	Köpetdag Stadium, Ashgabat, Turkmenistan	North Korea	3–0	3–1	2022 FIFA World Cup qualification

== Honors ==
=== Club ===
Dordoi Bishkek

- Kyrgyzstan League (1); 2019
- Kyrgyzstan Super Cup (1): 2019

Istiklol

- Tajikistan Higher League (1): 2020
- Tajik Supercup (1): 2020

=== Individual ===
- Best scorer in Kyrgyzstan League 2019: 20 goals.
