= COVID-19 pandemic in Tajikistan =

Ongoing COVID-19 viral pandemic in Tajikistan

- Disease: COVID-19
- Pathogen: SARS-CoV-2
- Location: Tajikistan
- First outbreak: Wuhan, China
- Index case: Dushanbe; Khujand
- Arrival date: 30 April 2020 (6 years, 5 months and 4 weeks)
- Confirmed cases: 17,388 (as of March 2, 2022)
- Active cases: 0
- Recovered: 17,263 (as of March 9, 2022)
- Deaths: 124 (as of March 9, 2022)
- Vaccinations: 9.279.471 (doses administered)

Government website
- covid.tj

The COVID-19 pandemic in Tajikistan is part of the worldwide pandemic of coronavirus disease 2019 (COVID-19) caused by severe acute respiratory syndrome coronavirus 2 (SARS-CoV-2). The virus was confirmed to have spread to Tajikistan when its index cases, in Dushanbe and Khujand, were confirmed on 30 April 2020.

== Background ==
On 12 January 2020, the World Health Organization (WHO) confirmed that a novel coronavirus was the cause of a respiratory illness in a cluster of people in Wuhan City, Hubei Province, China, which was reported to the WHO on 31 December 2019. The case fatality ratio for COVID-19 has been much lower than SARS of 2003, but the transmission has been significantly greater, with a significant total death toll.

== Timeline ==
=== February 2020 ===
On February 10, a Somon Air charter flight flew to Wuhan, Hubei, China to evacuate the fifty-four citizens of Tajikistan in the city. The flight carried humanitarian cargo including medical supplies from Tajikistan to Wuhan. On February 13, 13,000 copies of WHO guidelines and recommendations to reduce the risk of coronavirus infection were printed and distributed to Tajik citizens. At the time, more than 900 citizens who arrived in Tajikistan from China were being supervised by doctors in Tajikistan's hospitals. No cases of coronavirus were reported. On February 21, President Emomali Rahmon received a message from Chinese President Xi Jinping thanking Rahmon for his support in connection with the coronavirus outbreak. As of February 21, 1,066 Tajik citizens who arrived from China after February 1 had been put in infectious disease hospitals for quarantine, and 577 had already been discharged. No cases of coronavirus were confirmed among the quarantined. On February 26, sixty-three Tajik citizens (forty-six Tajik students from Wuhan and seventeen crew members of the Somon Air charter flight sent to retrieve them on February 11) were released from quarantine. None of the quarantined persons showed symptoms of flu-like disease. As of February 24, 1,148 Tajik citizens who arrived in Tajikistan from China after February 1 had been put in quarantine, and 955 had already been discharged.

=== March 2020 ===
Tajikistan initially blocked the entry of nationals of 35 countries, including the United Kingdom, United States, and Canada. On March 3, 2020, Tajikistan reduced the ban to five countries: China, Iran, Afghanistan, South Korea, and Italy. On March 4, some mosques in the capital city Dushanbe asked worshipers not to attend Friday prayers. A rush to stockpile food led to price hikes and shortages of flour and other staples. On March 5, the Health and Social Welfare Ministry said that there is enough food in Tajikistan to feed the country's population for two years. President Emomali Rahmon assured Tajiks there was no need to panic-buy food, but stockpiling continued. Tajikistan asked people to avoid public gatherings and mosque attendance. As of March 10, 1,583 Tajik citizens who arrived from China, South Korea, Japan, Italy, Iran and Afghanistan after February 1 had been put in quarantine, and 1,147 had already been discharged. No cases of coronavirus were confirmed in the country. As of March 14, 1,603 Tajik citizens who arrived from China, South Korea, Japan, Italy, Iran and Afghanistan after February 1 had been put in quarantine, and 1,280 had already been discharged. No cases of coronavirus were confirmed in the country.

As of March 18, there were no confirmed cases of coronavirus infections in Tajikistan and plans to celebrate Nowruz had not been canceled. In late March, border closings in Russia and Central Asia were preventing Tajik seasonal migrant workers from going to their place of work. As of March 18, 1,890 Tajik citizens who arrived from foreign countries after February 1 had been put in quarantine, and 1,426 had already been discharged. The Ministry of Health called on the country's people, "not to believe any false rumors concerning coronavirus cases confirmation in Tajikistan." As of March 23, 5,038 persons who arrived from foreign countries after February 1 had been put in quarantine, and 1,981 had already been discharged; 3,057 persons (including 107 persons with foreign nationality) were in quarantine. No cases of coronavirus were confirmed in the country. The Istiklol health complex in northern Tajikistan was being prepared for the quarantine of Tajikistan citizens arriving from abroad. A 24-hour hotline number (511) has been activated by the Anti-crisis Information Center under the Ministry of Health and Social Protection to answer questions from the Tajikistan general public related to coronavirus issues. On March 26 and 27, meetings concerning preparations for preventing a possible coronavirus outbreak were held. As of March 27, 5,919 Tajik citizens who arrived from abroad after February 1 had been put in quarantine, and 2,050 had already been discharged. No cases of coronavirus were confirmed in the country. As of March 30, 6,159 Tajik citizens who arrived from abroad after February 1 had been put in quarantine, and 2,146 had already been discharged leaving 4,013 in quarantine. No cases of coronavirus were confirmed in the country. In late March, President Emomali Rahmon was photographed participating in large public gatherings.

=== April 2020 ===
As of April 2, 6,272 people who arrived in Tajikistan from foreign countries after February 1 had been put in quarantine, and 2,359 had already been discharged, leaving 3,913 still in quarantine. No cases of coronavirus were confirmed in the country. By April 3, face masks, though not legally mandated, had become a familiar sight in Tajikistan, including in the remote countryside and schools had reopened after the spring holidays. On the same day, President Rahmon and Uzbekistan President Shavkat Mirziyoyev held a telephone conversation including discussion of coronavirus coordination. A 60-year old quarantined patient died of pneumonia in the Central Hospital of Jabbor Rasulov District, Sughd Region and the medical staff treating the patient were quarantined causing online rumors that the patient had died from coronavirus. Sources at the hospital said the patient tested negative for coronavirus before dying. As of April 6, 7,041 people who arrived in Tajikistan from foreign countries had been put in quarantine, and 4,291 had already been discharged, leaving 2,730 still in quarantine. Nearly 3,000 people had been tested for coronavirus, all with negative results. No cases of coronavirus were confirmed in the country. Thirteen people quarantined in Jabbor Rasulov District since April 5 tested negative for coronavirus. Six medical facilities in Khujand and twelve in other areas were prepared for quarantines and all coronavirus tests were to be conducted free of change. On April 9, President Rahmon called Kazakhstan President Kassym-Jomart Tokayev and discussed several topics including coronavirus. Kazakhstan stated that it agreed to send five thousand tons of flour to Tajikistan. On the same day, President Rahmon and Uzbekistan President Mirziyoyev held another telephone conversation including discussion of coronavirus coordination. As of April 10, 7,367 people who arrived in Tajikistan from foreign countries had been put in quarantine, and 5,482 had already been discharged, leaving 1,880 still in quarantine. On April 13, Minister of Foreign Affairs Sirojiddin Muhriddin met with the head of the European Union delegation to Tajikistan Marilyn Josefson. Josefson announced plans to provide Tajikistan with €48 million to mitigate the consequences of the pandemic. On April 14, Minister of Health and Social Protection Nasim Olimzoda said that coronavirus had not been detected in Tajikistan. Olimzoda explained the lack of confirmed coronavirus cases in Tajikistan as the result of the ongoing quarantine of all persons entering Tajikistan from abroad due to the danger of asymptomatic transmission. Uzbekistan's Ministry of Emergency Situations delivered aid to Tajikistan including one thousand tons of flour, antiseptics and disinfectants, medical gowns, gloves, masks and medical shoes, respirators and goggles. The Tajikhydroelektromontazh Company provided the Dushanbe Health Department with 20,000 coronavirus tests, 10 ventilation machines, and 500 sets of special medical clothing in total worth more than 5 million somoni.

As of April 17, 7,871 persons who arrived from foreign countries after February 1 had been put in quarantine, and 6,438 had already been discharged; 1,523 persons were still in quarantine. No cases of coronavirus were registered among the quarantined persons. Other diseases were registered in the general population including influenza, pneumonia, ARVI (acute respiratory viral infection), asthma and typhoid. President Rahmon made a speech to the newly elected and appointed members of the National Assembly of Tajikistan which touched on the coronavirus situation. Jaloliddin Abduljabborzoda, head of the department of internal affairs at the Dushanbe prosecutor's office, fell ill on April 15 and died on April 19. The Ministry of Health said that he died of H1N1 and explicitly ruled out death from coronavirus. According to Radio Free Europe/Radio Liberty, Abduljabborzoda's body was buried by medical personnel in special protective equipment. Tajik migrant workers in Russia who normally send money to their families in Tajikistan are not being paid due to the COVID-19 pandemic in Russia. Tajikistan's ambassador to Russia, Imomuddin Sattorov, has pleaded with the heads of companies in Russia to refrain from laying off Tajik workers. President Rahmon urged Muslims in Tajikistan not to forego fasting for Ramadan saying that fasting would make people more susceptible to infectious disease. On April 23, Tajikistan closed schools for two weeks to prevent the spread of coronavirus and temporarily banned export of grains and pulses, a measure aimed at conserving domestic supplies. There were no reported coronavirus cases in Tajikistan. At the time, Tajikistan's borders and mosques were closed. As of April 27, 4,100 tests for coronavirus had been conducted in Tajikistan. Galina Perfilyeva, the WHO representative in Dushanbe, who had initially confirmed the Tajikistan government position that the country remained free of the coronavirus, said "It's impossible to conclusively say that there is no coronavirus infection in Tajikistan."

Tajikistan was one of few countries to continue professional sporting matches during the pandemic; they have been cancelled in many countries. However, on 27 April the 2020 Tajikistan Higher League was suspended until 10 May.

On 30 April, the Ministry of Health reported 15 confirmed coronavirus cases as of 29 April: 10 in Khujand and 5 in Dushanbe. Previously, questions about Tajikistan's lack of reported coronavirus cases were raised in the media.

=== May 2020 ===
In early May, a ban on holding mass events with the participation of more than 400 people was introduced in Tajikistan.

On 1 May, there were 32 confirmed cases, of which 17 are in Dushanbe, 5 in cities and districts of republican subordination, and 10 in Sughd Region.

On 2 May, there were 76 confirmed cases and two deaths. All people have to wear face masks when they leave their house.

On 3 May, the number of cases went up to 128. The mayor of Dushanbe said that they will build temporary hospitals to treat 3,000 people.

102 additional cases were confirmed on May 4, which brought the total number to 230 cases, including 110 cases in Dushanbe, 22 cases in towns and districts of republican subordination, 7 in Gorno-Badakhshan, 21 in Khatlon region, 70 in Sughd region. All regions has cases.

On 6 May, the Tajikistan Football Federation extended the suspension of football indefinitely.

The total number of cases is 379 with 8 deaths and 246 recoveries.

As of May 8, there were 461 cases and 12 deaths.

=== July 2020 ===
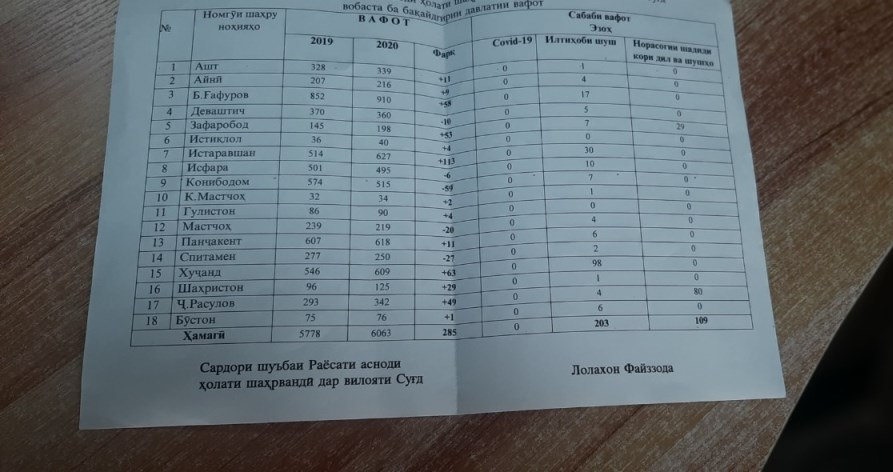
Sughd Civil Registry Office death report for the first half year of 2020

On July 15, during a press conference at the Sughd Civil Registry Office, it was reported that over the first six months of 2020 203 people had died of pneumonia, 109 people had died of heart disease and other types of lung diseases in the region. At the same time, it was noted that "none of the medical records listed COVID-19 as the cause of death."

=== January 2021 ===
By January 13, 2021, it was reported by the government that all cases had either recovered or died, leaving the country free of COVID-19 for the first time since April 2020. Tajikistan reported to be the first country in Central Asia to eradicate COVID-19, and would be the only country with over 10,000 total cases to have zero active cases. However, in spite of the rapid decline in cases, without further lockdown or vaccination policies being put in place, given the continuing number of active cases exceeding 1,000 in the neighboring countries of Uzbekistan, Kyrgyzstan and Afghanistan, it is unlikely that the virus has been eradicated from the country.

=== June 2021 ===
After five months and twelve days, Tajikistan recorded 63 new cases of COVID-19.

== Humanitarian aid ==
=== International Assistance ===
==== China ====
China has provided humanitarian assistance to Tajikistan to support the Tajik authorities' preventive and mitigation efforts against the novel coronavirus (COVID-19).

The handover ceremony of the humanitarian assistance took place on the Tajik-Chinese border in the Gorno Badakhshan Autonomous Region (GBAO) on March 30.

According to the Tajik MFA information department, the assistance included: 2,000 kits of nucleic acid reagents to detect the virus that causes COVID-19; 1,000 medical protective coveralls; 500 non-contact thermometers; 1,000 medial eyeglasses, 1,000 pairs of disposable medical gloves; and 1,000 pairs of disposable medical overshoes.

==== Germany ====
At the formal request of the Ministry of Health and Social Protection of the Population of the Republic of Tajikistan (MHSPPRT) and with financial support from the German Federal Ministry for Economic Cooperation and Development (BMZ), the Branch of the German Caritas Association in Tajikistan provided nearly €33,500 worth of humanitarian aid to 16 cities and districts in Tajikistan.

Donations, which included 2,000 protective suits; 810 hygiene kits; and 400 packages of foodstuffs, were aimed at strengthening preventive measures against COVID-19.

==== Iran ====
On May 7, the presidential press office of Tajikistan announced a phone conversation between Emomali Rahmon and Hassan Rouhani, the president of Iran about the pandemic and the Iranian president expressed preparations of Iran for helping Tajikistan with the pandemic, including sending equipment, health professionals and pharmaceuticals. 5 days later on May 12, the first Iranian medical aid cargo was sent to Tajikistan. The 6 tons cargo included N95 and other masks, isolated clothing, scrubs, face shields, etc.

==== Kazakhstan ====
In the context of the COVID-19 crisis, Kazakhstan has offered humanitarian aid to its Central Asian neighbours Kyrgyzstan and Tajikistan, answering a request by Bishkek and Dushanbe.

The president of Kazakhstan, Kassym-Jomart Tokayev, took the decision earlier this week to provide humanitarian assistance to its two neighbours. This includes 5,000 tons of Kazakhstan's flour for each country worth more than $3 million.

The decision was made following the official requests of the Kyrgyz and Tajik sides for food supplies.

Both Kyrgyzstan and Tajikistan have applied for IMF emergency financing. An IMF official said Tajikistan could potentially receive the equivalent of its IMF quota which stands at about $240 million. Neighbouring Kyrgyzstan, which has already received $121 million from the fund, has asked to double the sum, fully utilising its own quota.

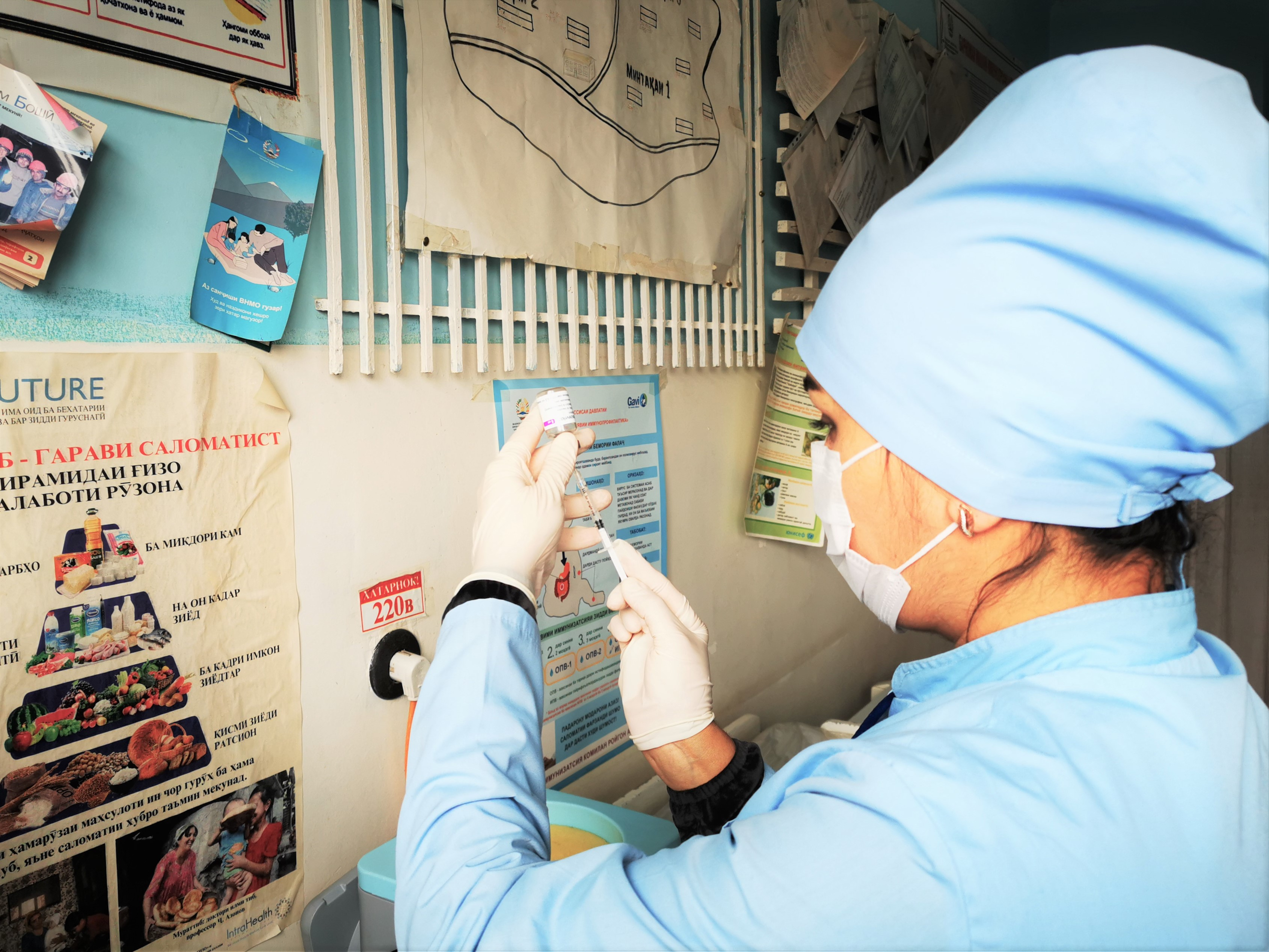
A nurse prepares a COVID vaccine dose supplied by USAID

==== United States ====
Through USAID, the United States provided over three million doses of COVID vaccine developed by American brands Pfizer and Moderna as well as $13.5 million in equipment and technical support for medical supplies, protective equipment, medical laboratory upgrades, and training to both public health officials and medical professionals.

==== Uzbekistan ====
On April 9, Uzbekistan provided humanitarian aid to Tajikistan totalling about $2.5 million, eighteen train cars carrying 1,000 tons of wheat flour and medical protective equipment, including disinfectants, medical gowns, disposable medical gloves, medical eyeglasses, face masks and disposable medical shoe covers, reportedly arrived in Dushanbe.

On May 8, on the instructions of the President, 8 Uzbek virologists and 10 tons of medical equipment, including 10 lung ventilators, were sent to Dushanbe.

On May 9, 144 medical containers were sent to Tajikistan from Uzbekistan for a temporary hospital at the Bofanda Stadium in Dushanbe.

=== Foreign aids accredited as local by the authorities ===
A heated debate was caused by "charitable help" with medicines from the local "Avesto Group" company, where China's humanitarian aid for Tajikistan was among the cargo. A video about this got on the Internet, logos of Tajik-Chinese friendship are visible on boxes with humanitarian aid.

Users of social networks fell into indignation and harsh criticism of the "Avesto Group" company, in which, according to the opposition, part of the action belongs to Rustam Emomali, the son of the country's president, chairman of the Majlisi Milli.

== Consequences ==
=== Press freedom in Tajikistan ===
Tajikistan expert Odinasho Sharopov explains why there is an effective media blackout on COVID-19 reporting. The Central Asian country has for years been at the bottom of press freedom indexes.

The media is under government control in every possible way. Content on electronic media such as television and radio stations is especially tightly controlled. Most media outlets are owned by the government.

Independent television and radio stations have been forced to tighten their grip on self-censorship for fear of losing their licenses. So they mainly produce entertainment. But it is obvious that the prosecution of these media organizations for criticism also plays a role.

In freedom of speech ratings from around the globe, various international organizations have ranked Tajikistan low recent years. Several dozen Tajik journalists, who worked in these publications, have received asylum in Europe — including Germany.
