= 2020 Tajik Super Cup =

- Event: Tajik Supercup
Istiklol	Khujand
2	1
- Date: 4 April 2020
- Venue: Pamir Stadium, Dushanbe
- Man of the Match: Manuchekhr Dzhalilov (Istiklol)
- Referee: Nasrullo Kabirov (Nurak)
- Attendance: 0

The 2020 Tajik Supercup was the 11th Tajik Supercup, an annual Tajik football match played between the winners of the previous season's Tajikistan Higher League and Tajikistan Cup. The match was contested by 2019 League and Cup champions Istiklol, and the league runners-up Khujand. It was held at the Pamir Stadium in Dushanbe on 4 April.

== Background ==
On 27 March, the Tajikistan Football Federation announce that the opening round of games would be played behind closed doors due to the threat of the COVID-19 pandemic, with referee Nasrullo Kabirov being confirmed as the match official on 1 April.

== Match details ==
4 April 2020
17:00 (UTC+5)

Istiklol	2–1	Khujand
M.Dzhalilov 77'; Rakhimov 78'	Report	Sanjar Rixsiboev 2'

Pamir Stadium, Dushanbe
Attendance: 0
Referee: Nasrullo Kabirov (Nurak)

Istiklol	Khujand

GK	1	(Tajikistan)	Rustam Yatimov
RB	5	(Tajikistan)	Iskandar Dzhalilov		(substituted off) 58'
CB	21	(Ukraine)	Oleksiy Larin
CB	2	(Serbia)	Marko Milić
CB	6	(Tajikistan)	Zoir Juraboev
LB	3	(Tajikistan)	Tabrezi Davlatmir
MF	7	(Russia)	Viktor Svezhov
MF	10	(Tajikistan)	Alisher Dzhalilov		(substituted off) 76'
MF	17	(Tajikistan)	Ehson Panjshanbe	(yellow card) 90+4'
FW	14	(Tajikistan)	Sheriddin Boboev		(substituted off) 58'
FW	63	(Tajikistan)	Manuchekhr Dzhalilov
Substitutes:
GK	16	(Tajikistan)	Dilshod Dodoboev
FW	9	(Turkmenistan)	Wahyt Orazsähedow		(substituted on) 58'
MF	11	(Tajikistan)	Muhammadjon Rakhimov		(substituted on) 58'
FW	13	(Tajikistan)	Rustam Soirov		(substituted on) 76'
MF	18	(Tajikistan)	Saidmuxtor Azimov
MF	20	(Tajikistan)	Salam Ashurmamdov
DF	26	(Tajikistan)	Shakhzod Davlatov
Manager:
(Tajikistan) Vitaliy Levchenko

GK	12	(Uzbekistan)	Mamur Ikramov
DF	5	(Tajikistan)	Manuchehr Safarov
DF	14	(Tajikistan)	Oybek Abdugafforov
DF	19	(Tajikistan)	Khurshed Beknazarov
DF	20	(Tajikistan)	Siroj Khamrayev
DF	21	(Tajikistan)	Firdavs Chakalov	(yellow card) 52'	(substituted off) 74'
MF	7	(Tajikistan)	Komroni Mirzonazhod
MF	8	(Tajikistan)	Bakhtiyor Choriyev		(substituted off) 74'
MF	70	(Tajikistan)	Abdulmumin Zabirov		(substituted off) 83'
MF	23	(Uzbekistan)	Sanjar Rixsiboev	(yellow card) 61'	(substituted off) 64'
FW	10	(Tajikistan)	Dilshod Bozorov
Substitutes:
GK	1	(Tajikistan)	Daler Barotov
MF	18	(Tajikistan)	Fatkhullo Fatkhuloev		(substituted on) 64'
DF	22	(Tajikistan)	Manouchehr Ahmadov
FW	51	(Uzbekistan)	Andrey Sidorov		(substituted on) 83'
MF	63	(Tajikistan)	Mukhammadsharifi Saidkhodzha		(substituted on) 74'
DF	73	(Tajikistan)	Alisher Barotov		(substituted on) 74'
Manager:
(Serbia) Nikola Lazarevic

Man of the Match:

Assistant referees:
Akmal Buriev (Tursunzoda)
Ismoil Nuraliev (Nurak)
Fourth official:
Gulmurodi Sadullo (Dushanbe)

Match rules

- 90 minutes
- Penalty shoot-out if scores level
- Seven named substitutes
- Maximum of six substitutions

== See also ==
- 2019 Tajik League
- 2019 Tajik Cup
