= Branislav Janković =

Montenegrin footballer

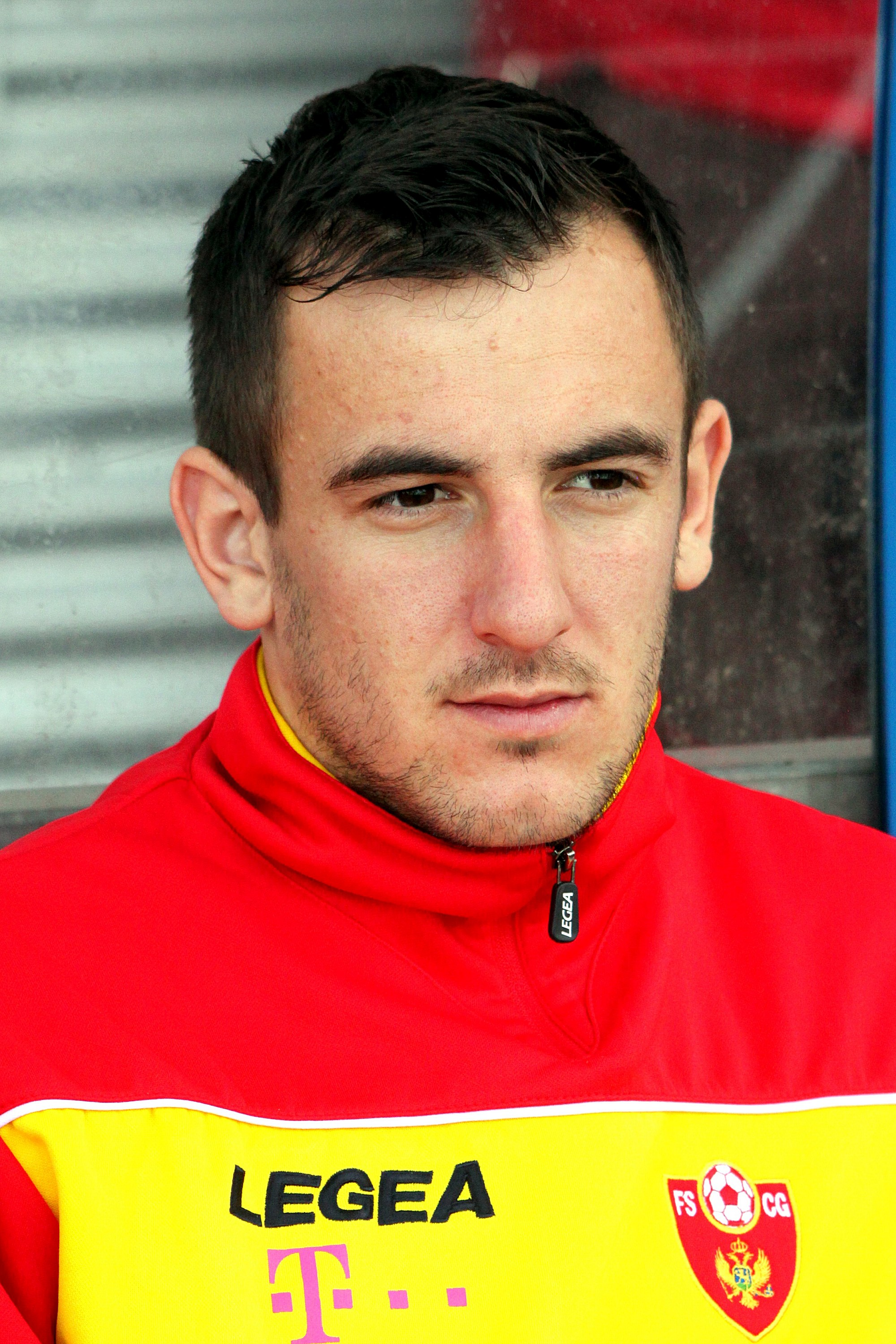
- Janković with Montenegro in 2014

Personal information
- Date of birth: 8 February 1992 (age 34)
- Place of birth: Kotor, SR Montenegro, Yugoslavia
- Height: 1.82 m (5 ft 11 1/2 in)
- Position: Midfielder

Team information
- Current team: Grbalj

Youth career
- Arsenal Tivat

Senior career*
Years	Team	Apps	(Gls)
2009–2015	Grbalj	118	(15)
2015–2017	Čukarički	39	(1)
2017	Rudar Pljevlja	15	(2)
2017–2021	Sutjeska Nikšić	73	(5)
2021	FC Turan	22	(0)
2021–2022	Budućnost Podgorica	26	(0)
2023	Iskra	14	(0)
2024–	Grbalj	25	(2)

International career^{‡}
2010–2011	Montenegro U19	5	(0)
2012–2014	Montenegro U21	9	(0)
2014–	Montenegro	9	(0)
- * Club domestic league appearances and goals as of 19 May 2024 ‡ National team caps and goals as of 19 April 2023

Branislav Janković (Serbian Cyrillic: Бранислав Јанковић; born 8 February 1992) is a Montenegrin professional footballer who plays as a central midfielder for Grbalj and the Montenegro national team.

== Club career ==
=== Grbalj ===
Janković started his senior career with Grbalj, making over 100 appearances in the Montenegrin First League between 2009 and 2015. After having spent almost five years with the club, Grbalj's director Nenad Maslovar left the club, and a conflict arose between Janković and Grbalj's club president Marko Carević after Janković chose not to renew his contract whose expiration was set for the summer of 2015. As a result, Carević forbid Janković from playing for the rest of the 2014-15 season. At around this time, Red Star Belgrade participated in negotiations with Grbalj for Janković's transfer, but the talks fell through.

=== Čukarički ===
After Janković's contract with OFK Grbalj expired in June 2015, he signed with Serbian side Čukarički on a four-year contract, and received the number 8 shirt. He immediately joined the rest of the team on their summer camp in Austria before their Europa League qualifying campaign. Although Čukarički ended up losing to Gabala in the second qualifying round, Janković played as a starter throughout Čukarički's brief Europa League campaign. On April 23, 2016, Janković scored the goal in Čukarički's 1-0 win against Partizan.

=== Rudar ===
On January 30, 2017, Janković signed for Montenegrin side FK Rudar, joining the club on a free transfer until the end of the season. In the course of the half-season, Rudar finished in eighth out of 12 teams in the 2016–17 Montenegrin First League. In addition to starting regularly during the season, Janković played in the subsequent relegation play-off with FK Otrant, which Rudar won 3-1 on aggregate.

=== Sutjeska ===
On July 9, 2017, it was announced that Janković signed a one-year contract with Sutjeska Nikšić. On May 12, 2018, he scored Sutjeska's only goal in a 1–1 tie with OFK Grbalj. In the summer of 2018, Janković received an offer from a Romanian team, after which he announced that he intended on leaving Sutjeska. However, in January 2019, he appeared at Sutjeska's winter training camp in an apparent return.

== International career ==
Janković represented his country at Under-19 and Under-21 level. He made his full international debut for Montenegro in a friendly against Slovakia on 23 May 2014.

== Statistics ==
Montenegro national team
Year	Apps	Goals
2014	3	0
Total	3	0

== Honours ==
Sutjeska

- Montenegrin First League: 2017–18
