= 2017 Tajikistan Cup =

2017 Tajik Cup
Tournament details
- Country: Tajikistan

The 2017 Tajik Cup is the 26th edition of the Tajik Cup. The cup winner qualifies for the 2018 AFC Cup.

The draw of the tournament was held on 22 May 2017.

== Round 1 ==
27 May 2017

"Barkchi" - "Ravshan" - 2: 2

"Vakhsh" - "Somon" - 3: 2

"Hulbuk" - "Eshata" - 0: 0

"Zarafshon" - "Vahdat" - 0: 1

28 May 2017

CSKA "Pamir" - "Panjshir" - 0: 0

"Regar-TadAZ" - "Khujand" - 2: 3

1 June 2017

"Somon" - "Vakhsh" - 1: 2

"Vahdat" - "Zarafshon" - 3: 1

"Ravshan" - "Barkchi" - 0: 1

"Eshata" - "Hulbuk" - 3: 0

2 June 2017

"Khujand" - "Regar-TadAZ" - 2: 2

"Panjshir" - CSKA "Pamir" - 1: 2

== Quarter-finals ==
9 August 2017 1st leg	Istiklol	6 – 0	Eshata	Hisor
20:00 (UTC+5)	Dzhalilov 7', 44' (yellow card); Asrorov 9'; Jalilov 41'; Fatkhuloev 80'; Vasiev 90+1'; Stetsenko (yellow card)	Report		Stadium: Central Stadium; Referee: Sayvali Turdiyev

20 September 2017 2nd leg	Eshata	2 – 6 (2 – 12 agg.)	Istiklol	Dushanbe
19:00 (UTC+5)	Mirzoev 6', 69'	Report	Juraboev 8', 48'; Dzhalilov 18' (pen.); Abdugafforov 26'; Hasan 35' (red card) 86'; Panjshanbe 45'; Stetsenko (yellow card); Davronov (yellow card); Jalilov (yellow card)	Stadium: Pamir Stadium; Attendance: 450; Referee: Gulmurody Sadullo

16 August 2017 1st leg	CSKA Pamir Dushanbe	3 – 0	Vakhsh Qurghonteppa	Dushanbe
17:30 (UTC+5)	Chakalov 51'; Chulibayev 86'; Sulaimonov 90+2'	Report	S.Sobirov (yellow card); K.Ismoilov (yellow card)	Stadium: CSKA Stadium; Attendance: 300; Referee: Khusrawi Siddiqzod

13 September 2017 2nd leg	Vakhsh Qurghonteppa	2 – 3 (2 – 6 agg.)	CSKA Pamir Dushanbe	Qurghonteppa
15:30 (UTC+5)	Akhunov 60'; Ibrohimzoda 81'; U.Sharipov (red card) 82'; A.Rakhmonov (yellow card); A.Habibulloev (yellow card)	Report	Kosimov 26'; Sulaimonov 35'; Dodhudoev 75'; Chakalov (red card) 77'	Stadium: Tsentralnyi Stadium; Attendance: 100; Referee: Behrouz Murtazoev

16 August 2017 1st leg	Khayr Vahdat	1 – 2	Khujand	Vahdat
(UTC+5)	Fuzailov 47'; B.Asamoah (yellow card); B.Abdulahatzoda (yellow card); F.Shamsiev (yellow card)	Report	Ahmadov 42'; Tokhirov 53'	Stadium: Khair Stadium; Attendance: 2,500; Referee: Behrouz Murtazoev

12 September 2017 2nd leg	Khujand	1 – 1 (3 – 1 agg.)	Khayr Vahdat	Khujand
(UTC+5)	Ahmadov 72'; Ergashev (yellow card); S.Khakimov (yellow card)	Report	Azizov 50'; B.Asamoah (yellow card); V.Sohibnazarov (yellow card); K.Nazarzoda (red card) 60'	Stadium: 20 Years of Independence Stadium; Attendance: 300; Referee: Sayojon Zainiddinov

26 August 2017 1st leg	Barki Tajik	4 – 0	Khosilot Farkhor	Dushanbe
(UTC+5)	Malodustov 33'; Yodgorov 36'; Parpiev 45+2', 90+1'; S.Samiev (yellow card)	Report	D.Jerry (yellow card); J.Martin (yellow card); A.Rajabaliev (yellow card)	Stadium: Pamir Stadium; Referee: Nekruz Umarov

12 September 2017 2nd leg	Khosilot Farkhor	0 – 4 (0 – 8 agg.)	Barki Tajik	Farkhor
(UTC+5)	A.Rajabaliyev (yellow card); S.Sharifov (yellow card); K.Mahmadiev (yellow card); J.Martey (yellow card)	Report	Malodustov 45+1'; Nurmatov 51'; Parpiev 55'; Samiev 60'; D.Yodgorov (yellow card)	Stadium: Central Stadium; Attendance: 1,000; Referee: Gulmurody Sadullo

== Semi-finals ==
17 November 2017 1st leg	Istiklol	1 – 0	CSKA Pamir Dushanbe	Hisor
15:00 (UTC+5)	Vasiev 15' (pen.); Stetsenko (yellow card)	Report	J.Mirzohon (yellow card); I.Khabibulloev (yellow card)	Stadium: Central Stadium; Attendance: 300; Referee: Behrouz Murtazoev

21 November 2017 2nd leg	CSKA Pamir Dushanbe	3 – 2 (3 – 3 (a) agg.)	Istiklol	Dushanbe
15:00 (UTC+5)	K. Mirzonajot 41'; S.Kosimov 44' (yellow card); Chakalov 68' (yellow card)	Report	Vasiev 6', 83'; Baranovskyi (yellow card) (yellow-red card) 73'; N.Stošić (yellow card); Stetsenko (yellow card)	Stadium: CSKA Stadium; Attendance: 300; Referee: Nasrullo Kabirov

30 September 2017 1st leg	Khujand	2 – 0	Barki Tajik	Khujand
(UTC+5)	Tukhtasunov 57' (yellow card); Mirzoev 77' (o.g.); R.Rakhmatov (yellow card); Ahmadov (yellow card); A.Khodzhibayev (yellow card); K.Beknazarov (yellow card)	Report	A.Zabirov (yellow card); H.Nurmatov (yellow card); V.Khanonov (yellow card)	Stadium: 20 Years of Independence Stadium; Attendance: 1,200; Referee: Nasrullo Kabirov

4 October 2017 2nd leg	Barki Tajik	2 – 2 (a.e.t.) (2 – 4 agg.)	Khujand	Hisor
15:30 (UTC+5)	Boboev 45+2'; Khanonov 84'	Report	Bozorov 102'; Rajamatov 109'	Stadium: Central Stadium; Attendance: 300; Referee: Khusrawi Siddiqzod

== Final ==
2 December 2017
14:00 (UTC+5)

Khujand	2 – 0	Istiklol
Ahmadov 41'; H.Rasulov 56'; D.Karimov (yellow card)	Report	Panjshanbe (red card) 90+6'; Jalilov (yellow card)

Central Republican Stadium, Dushanbe
Attendance: 3,000
Referee: Sayojon Zainiddinov

== Scorers ==
4 goals:

- (Tajikistan) Dilshod Vasiev - Istiklol

3 goals:

- (Tajikistan) Mukhsinjon Parpiev - Barki Tajik
- (Tajikistan) Manuchekhr Dzhalilov - Istiklol

2 goals:

- (Tajikistan) Tohir Malodustov - Barki Tajik
- (Tajikistan) Shamsiddin Kosimov - CSKA Pamir Dushanbe
- (Tajikistan) Bilol Sulaimonov - CSKA Pamir Dushanbe
- (Tajikistan) Saidamir Mirzoev - Eshata
- (Tajikistan) Amirbek Juraboev - Istiklol
- (Tajikistan) Manouchehr Ahmadov - Khujand

1 goals:

- (Tajikistan) Sheriddin Boboev - Barki Tajik
- (Tajikistan) Vakhdat Khanonov - Barki Tajik
- (Tajikistan) Hussein Nurmatov - Barki Tajik
- (Tajikistan) Shahrom Samiev - Barki Tajik
- (Tajikistan) Daler Yodgorov - Barki Tajik
- (Tajikistan) Firdavs Chakalov - CSKA Pamir Dushanbe
- (Tajikistan) Bakhodir Chulibayev - CSKA Pamir Dushanbe
- (Tajikistan) Orzu Dodhudoev - CSKA Pamir Dushanbe
- (Tajikistan) K.Mirzonajot - CSKA Pamir Dushanbe
- (Tajikistan) Fatkhullo Fatkhuloev - Istiklol
- (Tajikistan) Muhammadjoni Hasan - Istiklol
- (Tajikistan) Romish Jalilov - Istiklol
- (Tajikistan) Ehson Panjshanbe - Istiklol
- (Tajikistan) Umed Azizov - Khayr Vahdat
- (Tajikistan) Muzaffar Fuzailov - Khayr Vahdat
- (Tajikistan) Oybek Abdugafforov - Istiklol
- (Tajikistan) Siyovush Asrorov - Istiklol
- (Tajikistan) Daler Tukhtasunov - Khujand
- (Tajikistan) Dilshod Bozorov - Khujand
- (Tajikistan) Shokhrukh Rajamatov - Khujand
- (Tajikistan) Farkhod Tokhirov - Khujand
- (Tajikistan) Parviz Akhunov - Vakhsh Qurghonteppa
- (Tajikistan) Naim Ibrohimzoda - Vakhsh Qurghonteppa

Own goals:

- (Tajikistan) Sultonsho Mirzoev (30 September 2017 vs Khujand)

== See also ==
- 2017 Tajik League
