= 2017 FC Istiklol season =

FC Istiklol
2017 season
- President: Shohruh Saidov
- Manager: Mukhsin Mukhamadiev
- Stadium: Republican Stadium
- Tajik League: 1st
- Tajik Cup: Runners-up
- Tajik Supercup: Runners-up
- AFC Cup: Runners-up
- Top goalscorer: League: Dilshod Vasiev (16); All: Manuchekhr Dzhalilov (25)

The FC Istiklol 2017 season was Istiklol's ninth Tajik League season. They went into the season as defending Champions in the Tajik League, Tajik Cup and Tajik Supercup having completed a Domestic Treble during the 2016 season. They finished the season Tajik League Champions, and runners up in the Tajik Cup, Tajik Supercup and the AFC Cup.

== Squad ==
As of match played 2 December 2017

No.	Name	Nationality	Position	Date of birth (age)	Signed from	Signed in	Contract ends	Apps.	Goals
Goalkeepers
1	Nikola Stošić	(Serbia)	GK	15 March 1994 (aged 23)	Železničar Beograd	2013		91	0
35	Kurban Boboev	(Tajikistan)	GK	3 August 1987 (aged 30)	Istaravshan	2015		20	0
Defenders
2	Siyovush Asrorov	(Tajikistan)	DF	21 July 1992 (aged 25)	Khujand	2013		104	10
3	Tabrezi Davlatmir	(Tajikistan)	DF	6 June 1998 (aged 19)	Youth Team	2016		22	0
5	Artem Baranovskyi	(Ukraine)	DF	17 March 1990 (aged 27)	Olimpik Donetsk	2017		28	1
6	Oybek Abdugafforov	(Tajikistan)	DF	30 March 1995 (aged 22)	Khosilot Farkhor	2017		7	1
19	Akhtam Nazarov	(Tajikistan)	DF	29 September 1992 (aged 25)	Energetik Dushanbe	2013		125	12
27	Oleksandr Stetsenko	(Ukraine)	DF	2 March 1990 (aged 27)	Sumy	2017		17	0
Midfielders
4	David Mawutor	(Ghana)	MF	12 April 1992 (aged 25)		2016		66	13
7	Farhod Kosimov	(Tajikistan)	MF	18 September 2000 (aged 17)	Trainee	2018		6	0
8	Nuriddin Davronov	(Tajikistan)	MF	16 January 1991 (aged 26)	Dunav Ruse	2017			
11	Muhammadjon Rakhimov	(Tajikistan)	MF	15 October 1998 (aged 19)	Khosilot Farkhor	2017		13	1
18	Fatkhullo Fatkhuloev	(Tajikistan)	MF	24 March 1990 (aged 27)	Dynamo Dushanbe	2008			
20	Amirbek Juraboev	(Tajikistan)	MF	13 April 1996 (aged 21)	Barki Tajik	2016		49	4
21	Romish Jalilov	(Tajikistan)	MF	21 November 1995 (aged 22)	Youth Team	2012			
23	Ehson Panjshanbe	(Tajikistan)	MF	12 May 1999 (aged 18)	Youth Team	2016		28	3
70	Shakhrom Sulaimonov	(Tajikistan)	MF	27 June 1997 (aged 20)	loan from Utenis Utena	2017		0	0
Forwards
9	Jahongir Aliev	(Tajikistan)	FW	14 July 1996 (aged 21)	Khujand	2016		51	14
10	Dmitry Barkov	(Russia)	FW	19 June 1992 (aged 25)	Narva Trans	2017		32	9
14	Khomid Golami	(Afghanistan)	FW		Youth Team	2017		6	1
17	Dilshod Vasiev	(Tajikistan)	FW	12 February 1988 (aged 29)	Energetik Dushanbe	2009			
63	Manuchekhr Dzhalilov	(Tajikistan)	FW	27 September 1990 (aged 27)	Neftekhimik Nizhnekamsk	2015		91	86
Out on loan
12	Amirdzhon Safarov	(Tajikistan)	FW	18 February 1995 (aged 22)	Youth Team	2015		6	1
22	Sheriddin Boboev	(Tajikistan)	FW	21 April 1999 (aged 18)	Youth Team	2015		9	4
24	Oyatullo Safarov	(Tajikistan)	MF	19 December 2000 (aged 16)	Youth Team	2016		3	0
	Ziёvuddin Fuzaylov	(Tajikistan)	DF	7 March 2000 (aged 17)	Youth Team	2015		21	5
	Arthur Shabrin	(Tajikistan)	MF		Youth Team	2017		0	0
Left during the season
7	Farkhod Vosiyev	(Tajikistan)	DF	14 April 1990 (aged 27)	Orenburg	2017		8	1
14	Faridoon Sharipov	(Tajikistan)	MF	8 September 1994 (aged 23)	Regar-TadAZ	2016		36	2
16	Rustam Yatimov	(Russia)	GK	13 July 1998 (aged 19)		2017	2021	0	0
26	Sokhib Suvonkulov	(Tajikistan)	DF	15 September 1988 (aged 29)	Vakhsh Qurghonteppa	2009			
56	Alisher Safarov	(Tajikistan)	DF	24 June 1998 (aged 19)	Youth Team	2014		9	0
62	Jahongir Ergashev	(Tajikistan)	FW	6 March 1994 (aged 23)	Dynamo Brest	2017		7	1

=== Out on loan ===
Note: Flags indicate national team as defined under FIFA eligibility rules; some limited exceptions apply. Players may hold more than one non-FIFA nationality.

No.	Pos.	Nation	Player
12	FW	TJK	Amirdzhon Safarov (at Barki Tajik)
22	FW	TJK	Sheriddin Boboev (at Barki Tajik)
24	MF	TJK	Oyatullo Safarov (at Barki Tajik)

No.	Pos.	Nation	Player
—	DF	TJK	Ziёvuddin Fuzaylov (at Barki Tajik)
—	MF	TJK	Arthur Shabrin (at Barki Tajik)

== Transfers ==
=== Winter ===
In: Note: Flags indicate national team as defined under FIFA eligibility rules; some limited exceptions apply. Players may hold more than one non-FIFA nationality.

No.	Pos.	Nation	Player
5	DF	UKR	Artem Baranovskyi (from (Ukraine) Olimpik Donetsk)
7	DF	TJK	Farkhod Vosiyev (loan from (Russia) Orenburg)
8	MF	TJK	Nuriddin Davronov (loan from (Bulgaria) Dunav Ruse)
10	FW	RUS	Dmitry Barkov (from (Estonia) Narva Trans)
16	GK	RUS	Rustam Yatimov
21	MF	TJK	Romish Jalilov (loan return from (Tajikistan) Regar-TadAZ)
26	DF	TJK	Sokhib Suvonkulov (loan return from (Tajikistan) Barki Tajik)
62	FW	TJK	Jahongir Ergashev (from (Belarus) Dinamo Brest)

Out: Note: Flags indicate national team as defined under FIFA eligibility rules; some limited exceptions apply. Players may hold more than one non-FIFA nationality.

No.	Pos.	Nation	Player
13	MF	TJK	Nozim Babadjanov (to Bahrain SC)
15	DF	UKR	Petro Kovalchuk (to (Maldives) Club Green Streets)
12	FW	TJK	Amirdzhon Safarov (loan to (Tajikistan) Barki Tajik)
22	FW	TJK	Sheriddin Boboev (loan to (Tajikistan) Barki Tajik)
24	MF	TJK	Oyatullo Safarov (loan to (Tajikistan) Barki Tajik)
—	MF	TJK	Arthur Shabrin (loan to (Tajikistan) Barki Tajik)
—	GK	TJK	Emomali Soniev
—	DF	TJK	Ziёvuddin Fuzaylov (loan to (Tajikistan) Barki Tajik)
—	FW	TJK	Suhrob Jalilov

Trialists: Note: Flags indicate national team as defined under FIFA eligibility rules; some limited exceptions apply. Players may hold more than one non-FIFA nationality.

No.	Pos.	Nation	Player
—	DF	EST	Aleksandr Kulinitš
—	DF	UKR	Artem Baranovskyi
—	MF	SRB	Risto Ristović
—	FW	RUS	Dmitry Barkov
—	FW	UKR	Yuriy Vereshchak

=== Summer ===
In: Note: Flags indicate national team as defined under FIFA eligibility rules; some limited exceptions apply. Players may hold more than one non-FIFA nationality.

No.	Pos.	Nation	Player
6	DF	TJK	Oybek Abdugafforov (from (Tajikistan) Khosilot Farkhor)
8	MF	TJK	Nuriddin Davronov (from (Bulgaria) Dunav Ruse, previously on loan)
11	MF	TJK	Muhammadjon Rakhimov (from (Tajikistan) Khosilot Farkhor)
27	DF	UKR	Oleksandr Stetsenko (from (Ukraine) Sumy)
70	MF	TJK	Shakhrom Sulaimonov (loan from (Lithuania) Utenis Utena)

Out: Note: Flags indicate national team as defined under FIFA eligibility rules; some limited exceptions apply. Players may hold more than one non-FIFA nationality.

No.	Pos.	Nation	Player
7	DF	TJK	Farkhod Vosiyev (loan return to (Russia) Orenburg)
8	MF	TJK	Nuriddin Davronov (loan return to (Bulgaria) Dunav Ruse)
14	MF	TJK	Faridoon Sharipov (to (Tajikistan) Barki Tajik)
16	GK	RUS	Rustam Yatimov
26	DF	TJK	Sokhib Suvonkulov (to (Tajikistan) Vakhsh Qurghonteppa)
56	DF	TJK	Alisher Safarov
62	FW	TJK	Jahongir Ergashev (to (Tajikistan) Khujand)

Trialists: Note: Flags indicate national team as defined under FIFA eligibility rules; some limited exceptions apply. Players may hold more than one non-FIFA nationality.

No.	Pos.	Nation	Player
—	DF	UKR	Oleksandr Stetsenko

== Friendlies ==
10 January 2017	Istiklol	4–1	CSKA Pamir Dushanbe	Dushanbe
13:00 (UTC+5)	Barkov 14', 22'; A.Kulinitš 73'; Jalilov 85'	Report	N.Zokirov 83'	Stadium: Pamir Stadium; Attendance: 400; Referee: Erkin Madiboev

13 January 2017	Istiklol	5–1	Regar-TadAZ	Dushanbe
15:00 (UTC+5)	Fatkhuloev 18'; Dzhalilov 45+1'; Asrorov 68'; Jalilov 78'; Y.Vereshchak 89'	Report	D.Tuhtasunov 83'	Stadium: Pamir Stadium; Attendance: 500; Referee: Khusrawi Siddikzod

15 January 2017	Istiklol	3–2	Khosilot Farkhor	Dushanbe
15:00 (UTC+5)	Dzhalilov 34'; Barkov 50'; Aliev 62'	Report	S.Gafforov 7' (yellow card); K.Azizov 83'; S.Safarali (yellow card)	Stadium: Pamir Stadium; Attendance: 600; Referee: Nasrullo Kabirov

19 January 2017	Istiklol (Tajikistan)	1–2	(Azerbaijan) Inter Baku	Antalya, Turkey
20:00 (UTC+5)	Fatkhuloev 54'; D.Vasiev (yellow card)	Report	Seyidov 56'; Fardjad-Azad 77'; Scarlatache (yellow card)	Stadium: The Sense Deluxe Hotel; Referee: Vladimir Akodis (Ukraine)

23 January 2017	Istiklol (Tajikistan)	1–3	(Kazakhstan) Kaisar	Antalya, Turkey
18:00 (UTC+5)	Dzhalilov 21'; Fatkhuloev (red card) 65'; Suvonkulov (yellow card); Mawutor (yellow card); Jalilov (yellow card)	Report	Nikolić 24' (pen.); Baizhanov 32'; A.Zhakhayev 64'; E.Seytxanov (yellow card)	Stadium: The Sense Deluxe Hotel; Referee: Ravan Hamzazade (Azerbaijan)

26 January 2017	Istiklol (Tajikistan)	0–1	(Romania) Pandurii Târgu Jiu	Antalya, Turkey
19:00 (UTC+5)		Report	Firțulescu 33'	Stadium: The Sense Deluxe Hotel; Referee: Yasin Duran (Turkey)

30 January 2017	Istiklol (Tajikistan)	0–2	(Russia) Yenisey Krasnoyarsk	Antalya, Turkey
20:00 (UTC+5)	Ristović (yellow card); Nazarov (yellow card); Mawutor (yellow card) 84' (yellow-red card)	Report	Sarkisov 24'; Kozlov 78' (yellow card); Komkov (yellow card)	Stadium: The Sense Deluxe Hotel; Referee: Arthur Tavakalyan

12 February 2017	Istiklol	4–0	CSKA Pamir Dushanbe	Dushanbe
15:00 (UTC+5)	Suvonkulov 2'; Fatkhuloev 29'; Barkov 41'; D.Vasiev 85'	Report		Stadium: Pamir Stadium; Referee: Sayod Zayniddinov

28 March 2017	Istiklol	3–1	Barki Tajik	Dushanbe
15:00 (UTC+5)	Mawutor 36'; Barkov 38'; T.Dzhuraev 50'	Report	Boboev 43'	Stadium: Pamir Stadium; Attendance: 80; Referee: Sayodzhon Zayniddinov

22 July 2017	Istiklol	1–1	Khujand	Guliston
18:15 (UTC+5)	Dzhalilov 5' Nazarov (yellow card)	Report	K.Beknazarov 50'; Ergashev (yellow card)	Stadium: National Bank of the Republic of Tatarstan; Referee: Hurshed Dadaboev

25 July 2017	Neftchi Fargʻona (Uzbekistan)	2–1	(Tajikistan) Istiklol	Tashkent, Uzbekistan
(UTC+5)	Khakimov 53'; M.Mamazulumov 63'	Report	Vasiev 73' (pen.); Barkov (yellow card)	Stadium: Dustlik Stadium; Referee: Akobir Shukrullayev

27 July 2017	Mash'al Mubarek (Uzbekistan)	1–1	(Tajikistan) Istiklol	Tashkent, Uzbekistan
18:00 (UTC+5)	N.Pavlenko 57'	Report	Dzhalilov 9'; Nazarov (yellow card); Fatkhuloev (yellow card); Suvonkulov (yellow card)	Stadium: Transport Institute Stadium; Referee: Sherzod Kasymov

29 July 2017	Metallurg Bekabad (Uzbekistan)	1–1	(Tajikistan) Istiklol	Tashkent, Uzbekistan
(UTC+5)	I.Iskhokjonov 15'; S.Kadyrkulov (yellow card); A.Ziyavuddinov (yellow card)	Report	Vasiev 90'; Fatkhuloev (yellow card)	Stadium: Dustlik Stadium; Attendance: 80; Referee: Ahrol Riskullaev

4 September 2017	Istiklol	v	Kuktosh	Hisor
17:00 (UTC+5)				Stadium: Central Stadium

== TFF Cup ==
=== Preliminary round ===
Pos	Team	Pld	W	D	L	GF	GA	GD	Pts	Qualification
1	(Tajikistan) Khosilot Farkhor	3	3	0	0	14	0	+14	9	Advance to Group Stage
2	(Tajikistan) Khayr Vahdat	3	2	0	1	3	3	0	6	Advance to Group Stage
3	(Tajikistan) Istiklol	3	1	0	2	3	11	−8	3	Advance to Group Stage
4	(Tajikistan) Barki Tajik	3	0	0	3	1	8	−7	0	

Updated to match(es) played on 2 February 2017. Source: Istiklol

26 January 2017 1	Istiklol	1–2	Barki Tajik	Dushanbe
15:00 (UTC+5)	S.Bobo 9'; H.Safarali 61'	Summary	V.Khotamov 88'	Stadium: Pamir Stadium; Attendance: 200; Referee: Abdulrahim Boboev

28 January 2017 2	Istiklol	0–7	Khosilot Farkhor	Dushanbe
12:30 (UTC+5)	M.Khodzhaev (yellow card); M.Abdakov (yellow card)	Summary	Sa.Gafforov 27'; A.Jones 43'; Abdugafforov 47'; A.Khodzhibaev 53'; Sh.Gafforov 62', 75' (pen.); I.Bahrom 86'; Rabimov (yellow card)	Stadium: Pamir Stadium; Attendance: 100; Referee: Sayëdzhon Zayniddinov

30 January 2017 3	Istiklol	1–3	Khayr Vahdat	Dushanbe
15:00 (UTC+5)	F.Qosimov 87'; S.Djamolov (yellow card); Z.Muzaffarov (yellow card)	Summary	U.Azizov 41'; M.Parpiev 47'; M.Muzaffarov 73'; D.Tugonshoev (yellow card); S.Hotham (yellow card)	Stadium: Pamir Stadium; Attendance: 200; Referee: Akobir Fayzullozoda

=== Finals Group ===
Pos	Team	Pld	W	D	L	GF	GA	GD	Pts	Qualification
1	(Tajikistan) Istiklol	3	3	0	0	29	3	+26	9	Advance to Semi-finals
2	(Tajikistan) Regar-TadAZ	3	2	0	1	13	6	+7	6	Advance to Semi-finals
3	(Tajikistan) Khulbuk	3	1	0	2	8	20	−12	3	
4	(Tajikistan) Asht	3	0	0	3	7	28	−21	0	

Updated to match(es) played on 16 February 2017. Source: Istiklol

14 February 2017 1	Istiklol	11–0	Khulbuk	Dushanbe
17:00 (UTC+5)	Fatkhuloev 22', 45+1'; Ergashev 27', 44'; Aliev 28'; Barkov 34'; Davronov 62'; Jalilov 80'; D.Vasiev 89', 90+2'; Sharipov 90+1'; M.Hassan (yellow card)	Summary	N.Sohibnazar (yellow card); D.Shomadov (yellow card)	Stadium: Pamir Stadium; Referee: Abdurashid Murodov

16 February 2017 2	Istiklol	14–1	Asht	Dushanbe
17:00 (UTC+5)	Jalilov 1', 45+1'; D.Vasiev 9', 13', 27', 41', 44', 49'; Ergashev 45', 57', 90'; Barkov 58', 87'; Fatkhuloev 67'; Davlatmir (yellow card)	Summary	Suvonkulov 25' (o.g.); D.Abdulloev (yellow card)	Stadium: Pamir Stadium; Attendance: 500; Referee: Gulmurod Sadullo

18 February 2017 3	Regar-TadAZ	2–4	Istiklol	Dushanbe
17:00 (UTC+5)	Aliev 21', 30'; Fatkhuloev 48'; D.Vasiev 75' (pen.); Panjshanbe (yellow card)	Summary	E.Khotimsky 24'; D.Bozorov 41' (pen.); D.Ergashev (yellow card); F.Garayev (yellow card)	Stadium: Pamir Stadium; Attendance: 200; Referee: Khusrawi Siddikzod

=== Knockout phase ===
22 February 2017 Semi-final	Istiklol	3–0	Ravshan Kulob	Dushanbe
14:00 (UTC+5)		Summary		Stadium: Pamir Stadium

24 February 2017 Final	Istiklol	2–1	Regar-TadAZ	Dushanbe
17:00 (UTC+5)	Davronov (yellow card) 20'; Asrorov (red card) 31'; D.Vasiev 67', 89'	Summary	A.Toshev (yellow card) 62'; A.Sharipov (yellow card) 64' (goal) 90+3'; B.Choriyev (yellow card) 67'	Stadium: Pamir Stadium; Referee: Saivali Turdiev

== Competitions ==
=== Tajik Supercup ===
4 March 2017	Istiklol	1–2	Khosilot Farkhor	Hisor
14:00 (UTC+5)	Barkov 87'; Baranovskyi (yellow card)	Summary	K.Azizov 8'; A.Jones 29'; S.Muso (yellow card); A.Rakhmonov (yellow card); G.Akuffo (yellow card); Rabimov (yellow card); Abdugafforov (yellow card); Rustamov (yellow card)	Stadium: Central Stadium; Attendance: 14,000; Referee: Hurshed Dadaboev

=== Tajik League ===
==== Results summary ====
Overall								Home						Away					
Pld	W	D	L	GF	GA	GD	Pts	W	D	L	GF	GA	GD	W	D	L	GF	GA	GD
21	17	4	0	64	10	+54	55	10	2	0	35	9	+26	7	2	0	29	1	+28

Last updated: 27 November 2017.
Source: See Results

==== Results by round ====
Round	1	2	3	4	5	6	7	8	9	10	11	12	13	14	15	16	17	18	19	20	21
Ground	A	H	H	H	H	H	A	A	H	A	A	A	A	H	H	H	H	H	A	H	A
Result	W	D	W	W	W	W	W	D	W	D	W	W	W	W	W	W	W	D	W	W	W
Position	1	3	2	1	1	1	1	1	1	1	1	1	1	1	1	1	1	1	1	1	1

Source: Results
A = Away; H = Home; W = Win; D = Draw; L = Loss

==== Results ====
8 March 2017 1	Istiklol	6–0	Barki Tajik	Dushanbe
18:30 (UTC+5)	Dzhalilov 9', 29', 43'; Barkov 20', 84'; Aliev 44'; Jalilov (yellow card)	Report		Stadium: Central Republican Stadium; Attendance: 200; Referee: Khusrawi Siddikzod

18 March 2017 3	Istiklol	0–0	Regar-TadAZ	Dushanbe
15:00 (UTC+5)	Fatkhuloev (yellow card)	Report	A.Toshev (yellow card); A.Sharipov (yellow card); B.Choriyev (yellow card); S.Amrohon (yellow card)	Stadium: Central Republican Stadium; Attendance: 300; Referee: Nasrullo Kabirov

10 April 2017 5	Istiklol	8–2	Khosilot Farkhor	Dushanbe
18:30 (UTC+5)	Dzhalilov 11' (pen.), 34', 49', 52'; Davronov 12'; Nazarov 39'; Aliev 53'; D.Vasiev 56'; Asrorov (red card) 78'; Jalilov (yellow card); Mawutor (yellow card); Panjshanbe (yellow card)	Report	A.Jones 19' (yellow card); S.Gaforov 80' (yellow card) 20' (yellow-red card) 88'; S.Karimov (yellow card)	Stadium: Central Republican Stadium; Attendance: 2,500; Referee: Behrouz Murtazoev

14 April 2017 6	Istiklol	2–1	Panjshir	Dushanbe
18:30 (UTC+5)	Dzhalilov 20' (pen.); Barkov 66'; K.Boboev (yellow card)	Report	B.Niyozov 57' (yellow card); R.Azizov (yellow card)	Stadium: Central Republican Stadium; Attendance: 500; Referee: Sayvali Turdiyev

23 April 2017 7	Istiklol	2–0	Vakhsh Qurghonteppa	Dushanbe
18:30 (UTC+5)	Fatkhuloev 9'; Ergashev 26'; Davlatmir (yellow card)	Report	B.Kholikov (yellow card)	Stadium: Central Republican Stadium; Attendance: 200; Referee: Behrouz Murtazoev

27 April 2017 2	Istiklol	3–0	CSKA Pamir Dushanbe	Dushanbe
16:30 (UTC+5)	Dzhalilov 31', 60' (pen.); D.Vasiev 90+3'; Davronov (yellow card); Amirbek (yellow card)	Report		Stadium: FFT Academy; Attendance: 300; Referee: Khusrawi Siddikzod

8 May 2017 4	Khujand	1–2	Istiklol	Khujand
16:30 (UTC+5)	Ahmadov 83'; D.Bozorov (yellow card)	Report	Baranovskyi 13'; F.Vosiyev 68'; Mawutor (yellow card)	Stadium: 20 Years of Independence Stadium; Attendance: 2,100; Referee: Saivali Turdiev

12 May 2017 10	Khosilot Farkhor	0–0	Istiklol	Farkhar
16:30 (UTC+5)	Rakhimov (yellow card); S.Karimov (yellow card); J.Muminov (yellow card)	Report	Fatkhuloev (yellow card); Panjshanbe (yellow card)	Stadium: Central Stadium; Attendance: 5,000; Referee: Behrouz Murtazoev

25 May 2017 11	Istiklol	3–0	Khujand	Dushanbe
20:00 (UTC+5)	Jalilov 10' (yellow card); Barkov 49'; S.Khakimov 59' (o.g.); Davlatmir (yellow card); Dzhalilov (yellow card)	Report	R.Domlodzhonov (yellow card); Tukhtasunov (red card) 76'	Stadium: Central Republican Stadium; Attendance: 500; Referee: Khusrawi Siddikzod

18 June 2017 12	Regar-TadAZ	1–1	Istiklol	Tursunzoda
18:00 (UTC+5)	F.Rakhmatov 23'; B.Choriyev (yellow card); A.Ravshanov (yellow card)	Report	Fatkhuloev 45' (yellow card)	Stadium: TALCO Arena; Attendance: 3,000; Referee: Behrouz Murtazoev

21 June 2017 9	Panjshir	1– 6	Istiklol	Kolkhozobod
(UTC+5)	A.Boron 75' (pen.); S.Nabotov (yellow card); A.Todzhiahmedov (yellow card); A.Salimov (yellow card)	Report	Fatkhuloev 15' (yellow card); D.Vasiev 18', 37'; Mawutor 27' (yellow card); Aliev 38'; Nazarov 52'	Stadium: Panjshir Uktam Mamatova; Attendance: 4,000; Referee: Khusrawi Sidddikzod

25 June 2017 13	CSKA Pamir Dushanbe	0–4	Istiklol	Dushanbe
18:00 (UTC+5)	I.Habibulloev (yellow card); M.Inocente (yellow card); K.Mirzohon (yellow card)	Report	Vasiev 13' (pen.); Fatkhuloev 41' (yellow card); Dzhalilov 69', 90+2'; Suvonkulov (yellow card); Mawutor (yellow card)	Stadium: CSKA Stadium; Attendance: 300; Referee: Sayodzhon Zayniddinov

29 June 2017 8	Vakhsh Qurghonteppa	1–5	Istiklol	Qurghonteppa
(UTC+5)	Davlatmir 77' (o.g.); A. Murodov (yellow card)	Report	H.Beknazarov 44' (o.g.); Juraboev 66'; Panjshanbe 72'; Dzhalilov 75'; Vasiev 84'	Stadium: Tsentralnyi Stadium; Referee: Abdurashid Murodov

30 July 2017 14	Istiklol	–	Barki Tajik	Dushanbe
(UTC+5)				Stadium: Central Republican Stadium

3 August 2017 15	Istiklol	1–0	Vakhsh Qurghonteppa	Hisor
20:00 (UTC+5)	Barkov 52'; Stetsenko (yellow card)	Report	H.Rustamov (yellow card); A.Barotov (yellow card)	Stadium: Central Stadium; Attendance: 1,500; Referee: Sayojon Zainiddinov

14 August 2017 16	Istiklol	2–0	Regar-TadAZ	Hisor
(UTC+5)	Vasiev 82'; Dzhalilov 85'; Mawutor (yellow card)	Report	A.Jones (yellow card); F.Karaev (yellow card); J.Tursunov (yellow card)	Stadium: Central Stadium; Attendance: 2,000; Referee: Behrouz Murtazoev

19 August 2017 17	Khosilot Farkhor	–	Istiklol	Farkhar
17:30 (UTC+5)				Stadium: Central Stadium

23 August 2017 18	Istiklol	–	Khujand	Hisor
17:30 (UTC+5)				Stadium: Central Stadium

18 September 2017 19	Istiklol	5–0	Panjshir	Hisor
19:00 (UTC+5)	Fatkhuloev 37', 90'; Davronov 45' (pen.); Vasiev 47'; Aliev 85'; Rakhimov (yellow card); Davlatmir (yellow card)	Report	S.Khudoinazarov (yellow card); R.Azizov (yellow card)	Stadium: Central Stadium; Attendance: 500; Referee: Abdurashid Murodov

23 September 2017 20	Istiklol	–	CSKA Pamir Dushanbe	Hisor
16:00 (UTC+5)				Stadium: Central Stadium

21 October 2017 21	Barki Tajik	–	Istiklol	Dushanbe
15:30 (UTC+5)				Stadium: Central Republican Stadium

25 October 2017 18	Istiklol	5–4	Khujand	Hisor
18:00 (UTC+5)	K.Beknazarov 19' (o.g.); K.Golami 21'; Vasiev 34', 53'; Dzhalilov 88'; Davlatmir (yellow card); Panjshanbe (yellow card)	Report	Tukhtasunov 41', 77'; Ahmadov 64'; A.Khodjiboev 81'; S.Rajamatov (yellow card); D.Dadaboev (yellow card)	Stadium: Central Stadium; Referee: Abdurashid Murodov
Note: Match re-arranged from 23 August 2017.

19 November 2017 14	Istiklol	2–2	Barki Tajik	Hisor
14:00 (UTC+5)	Vasiev 12' (pen.); Fatkhuloev 37'; Abdugafforov (yellow card); Rakhimov (yellow card); Mawutor (yellow card)	Report	Boboev 79'; S.Samiev 88'	Stadium: Central Stadium; Attendance: 200; Referee: Gulmurody Sadullo

23 November 2017 21	Barki Tajik	0–2	Istiklol	Hisor
14:00 (UTC+5)	B.Khairiev (red card) 67'; K.Maliev (red card) 67'; S.Asimov (yellow card); M.Parpiev (yellow card)	Report	Vasiev 66', 74'; Abdugafforov (yellow card); Panjshanbe (yellow card); Asrorov (yellow card)	Stadium: Central Stadium; Attendance: 200; Referee: Abdurashid Murodov

25 November 2017 20	Istiklol	2–0	CSKA Pamir Dushanbe	Dushanbe
14:00 (UTC+5)	Asrorov 60'; Nazarov 87' (yellow card); Stetsenko (yellow card); Panjshanbe (yellow card)	Report	S.Kosimov (yellow card); S.Bilolov (yellow card) Chakalov (yellow card)	Stadium: Central Republican Stadium; Attendance: 300; Referee: Khurshed Dadaboev

27 November 2017 17	Khosilot Farkhor	1–3	Istiklol	Farkhar
14:00 (UTC+5)	Vasiev 36', 50', 69'; Barkov (yellow card)	Report	K.Azizov (penalty missed) 90+1' 90+1'	Stadium: Central Stadium; Attendance: 800; Referee: Sayvali Turdiev

==== League table ====
Pos	Team	Pld	W	D	L	GF	GA	GD	Pts	Qualification or relegation
1	Istiklol (C)	21	17	4	0	64	14	+50	55	2018 AFC Cup
2	Khujand	21	11	4	6	44	22	+22	37	2018 AFC Cup
3	CSKA Pamir Dushanbe	21	8	10	3	19	13	+6	34	
4	Regar-TadAZ	21	6	6	9	22	23	−1	24	
5	Barki Tajik	21	6	6	9	20	27	−7	24	
6	Vakhsh Qurghonteppa	21	5	7	9	17	28	−11	22	
7	Panjshir	21	5	4	12	25	48	−23	19	Qualification for relegation play-offs
8	Khosilot Farkhor (R)	21	4	3	14	17	55	−38	15	Relegation to Tajik First Division

Updated to match(es) played on 27 November 2017. Source: Fifa
Rules for classification: 1) points; 2) goal difference; 3) number of goals scored.
(C) Champions; (R) Relegated

=== Tajik Cup ===
9 August 2017 Quarter Final 1st leg	Istiklol	6–0	Eshata	Hisor
20:00 (UTC+5)	Dzhalilov 7', 44' (yellow card); Asrorov 9'; Jalilov 41'; Fatkhuloev 80'; Vasiev 90+1'; Stetsenko (yellow card)	Report		Stadium: Central Stadium; Referee: Sayvali Turdiyev

20 September 2017 Quarter Final 2nd leg	Eshata	2–6 (2–12 agg.)	Istiklol	Dushanbe
19:00 (UTC+5)	S.Mirzoev 6', 69'	Report	Juraboev 8', 48'; Dzhalilov 18' (pen.); Abdugafforov 26'; Rakhimov 35' (red card) 86'; Panjshanbe 45'; Stetsenko (yellow card); Davronov (yellow card); Jalilov (yellow card)	Stadium: Pamir Stadium; Attendance: 450; Referee: Gulmurody Sadullo

17 November 2017 Semi Final 1st leg	Istiklol	1–0	CSKA Pamir Dushanbe	Hisor
15:00 (UTC+5)	Vasiev 15' (pen.); Stetsenko (yellow card)	Report	J.Mirzohon (yellow card); I.Khabibulloev (yellow card)	Stadium: Central Stadium; Attendance: 300; Referee: Behrouz Murtazoev

21 November 2017 Semi Final 2nd leg	CSKA Pamir Dushanbe	3–2 (3 – 3 (a) agg.)	Istiklol	Dushanbe
15:00 (UTC+5)	K. Mirzonajot 41'; S.Kosimov 44' (yellow card); Chakalov 68' (yellow card)	Report	Vasiev 6', 83'; Baranovskyi (yellow card) (yellow-red card) 73'; N.Stošić (yellow card); Stetsenko (yellow card)	Stadium: CSKA Stadium; Attendance: 300; Referee: Nasrullo Kabirov

==== Final ====
2 December 2017	Khujand	2–0	Istiklol	Dushanbe
14:00 (UTC+5)	Ahmadov 41'; H.Rasulov 56'; D.Karimov (yellow card)	Report	Panjshanbe (red card) 90+6'; Jalilov (yellow card)	Stadium: Central Republican Stadium; Attendance: 3,000; Referee: Sayojon Zainiddinov

=== AFC Cup ===
==== Group stage ====
Pos	Team	Pld	W	D	L	GF	GA	GD	Pts	Qualification
1	(Tajikistan) Istiklol	6	5	1	0	15	4	+11	16	Inter-zone play-off semi-finals
2	(Turkmenistan) Altyn Asyr	6	4	1	1	12	4	+8	13	
3	(Kyrgyzstan) Dordoi	6	1	0	5	6	16	−10	3 (Note: Head-to-head results: Dordoi 1–0 Alay Osh, Alay Osh 5–4 Dordoi (Dordoi won on away goals).)	
4	(Kyrgyzstan) Alay Osh	6	1	0	5	9	18	−9	3	

Source: AFC
Rules for classification: Group stage tiebreakers
Notes:

14 March 2017 1	Istiklol (Tajikistan)	2–0	(Kyrgyzstan) Dordoi Bishkek	Dushanbe, Tajikistan
18:30 (UTC+5)	Mawutor 17' (yellow card) 32'; Aliev 22'	Report	J.u.Kayrat (yellow card) 12'; T.u.Baktay (yellow card) 50'	Stadium: Republican Stadium; Attendance: 16,500; Referee: Yaqoub Al Hammadi (UAE)

4 April 2017 2	Altyn Asyr (Turkmenistan)	1–1	(Tajikistan) Istiklol	Balkanabat, Turkmenistan
17:00 (UTC+5)	Annadurdyýew 49' (yellow card) 80'; Annaorazow (yellow card) 56'	Report	Jalilov (yellow card) 22' (yellow-red card) 90+2'; Aliev 31'; Juraboev (yellow card) 77'	Stadium: Sport toplumy Attendance: 8,500; Referee: Jameel Abdulhusin (Bahrain)

18 April 2017 3	Istiklol (Tajikistan)	3–1	(Kyrgyzstan) Alay Osh	Dushanbe, Tajikistan
19:00 (UTC+5)	Barkov (yellow card) 39'; Davronov 45+1' (pen.); Mawutor 68'; Aliev (yellow card) 79'; D.Vasiev 89'	Report	Mamatov (yellow card) 25'; Mahkamov (yellow card) 44'; A.Sylla 59'; Sidibé (yellow card) 86'	Stadium: Republican Stadium; Attendance: 14,500; Referee: Hiroyuki Kimura (Japan)

3 May 2017 4	Alay Osh (Kyrgyzstan)	1–4	(Tajikistan) Istiklol	Osh, Kyrgyzstan
16:00 (UTC+5)	U.Tokhtasin (yellow card) 85'; Abdurakhmanov 88'	Report	Dzhalilov 32', 39'; D.Vasiev 78' (pen.), 82'; Juraboev (yellow card) 90'	Stadium: Suyumbayev Stadion; Attendance: 3,000; Referee: Jansen Foo (Singapore)

17 May 2017 5	Dordoi Bishkek (Kyrgyzstan)	1–4	(Tajikistan) Istiklol	Bishkek, Kyrgyzstan
18:00 (UTC+5)	Z.Soulemana 50'; A.Otkeev (yellow card) 59'; Kozubaev (yellow card) 82'	Report	Dzhalilov 7', 46', 75'; I.Potapov 90+3' (o.g.)	Stadium: Dolen Omurzakov Stadium; Attendance: 1,000; Referee: Ng Chiu Kok (Hong Kong)

31 May 2017 6	Istiklol (Tajikistan)	1–0	(Turkmenistan) Altyn Asyr	Dushanbe, Tajikistan
20:00 (UTC+5)	Nazarov (yellow card) 14'; Fatkhuloev (yellow card) 82'; Aliev (yellow card) 90+1'; Vasiev 90+2'	Report	R.Hojaýew (yellow card) 13'; Annaorazow (yellow card) 53'	Stadium: Republican Stadium; Attendance: 9,000; Referee: Yaqoob Abdul Baki (Oman)

==== Knockout stage ====
22 August 2017 Inter-Zone Play-Off Semi-Final 1st leg	Istiklol (Tajikistan)	4–0	(Philippines) Ceres–Negros	Hisor, Tajikistan
19:00 (UTC+5)	Juraboev (yellow card) 13'; Mawutor (yellow card) 21'; Nazarov 25' (pen.) (yellow card) 60'; Jalilov 45'; Dzhalilov 67', 88'	Report	Schröck (yellow card) 72'; Bienve (yellow card) 86'	Stadium: Hisor Central Stadium; Attendance: 13,800; Referee: Nivon Robesh Gamini (Sri Lanka)

12 September 2017 Inter-Zone Play-Off Semi-Final 2nd leg	Ceres–Negros (Philippines)	1–1 (1–5 agg.)	(Tajikistan) Istiklol	Bacolod, Philippines
16:30 (UTC+5)	Ingreso (yellow card) 4'; Súper 34'; Bienve (yellow card) 85'	Report	Juraboev (yellow card) 12'; Mawutor (yellow card) 24'; Fatkhuloev (yellow card) 25'; Barkov 45+2' (yellow card) 85'; Baranovskyi (red card) 69'	Stadium: Panaad Park and Stadium; Attendance: 4,752; Referee: Ko Hyung-jin (South Korea)

27 September 2017 Inter-zone play-off final 1st leg	Istiklol (Tajikistan)	1–0	(India) Bengaluru	Hisor, Tajikistan
19:00 (UTC+5)	Barkov 27'; Davronov (yellow card) 73'	Report		Stadium: Hisor Central Stadium; Attendance: 11,000; Referee: Valentin Kovalenko (Uzbekistan)

18 October 2017 Inter-zone play-off final 2nd leg	Bengaluru (India)	2–2 (2–3 agg.)	(Tajikistan) Istiklol	Bangalore, India
18:30 (UTC+5)	Sandhu (yellow card) 3'; Bheke 24'; Khabra (yellow card) 25' (yellow-red card) 42'; Juanan (yellow card) 57'; Chhetri 65' (pen.)	Report	Davronov 4' (pen.); Aliev (yellow card) 41'; Fatkhuloev (yellow card) 42'; Jalilov (yellow card) 54'; Barkov 56'; Stetsenko (yellow card) 90+3'	Stadium: Sree Kanteerava Stadium; Attendance: 7,862; Referee: Fahad Al-Marri (Qatar)

==== Final ====
4 November 2017	Istiklol (Tajikistan)	0–1	(Iraq) Al-Quwa Al-Jawiya	Hisor, Tajikistan
18:00 (UTC+5)	Fatkhuloev (yellow card) 58'; Asrorov (yellow card) 60'; Jalilov (yellow card) 90+1'	Report	Midani (yellow card) 66'; Mohsin 68'; Ali Bari (yellow card) 87'	Stadium: Hisor Central Stadium; Referee: Mohammed Abdulla Hassan Mohamed (United Arab Emirates)

== Squad statistics ==
As of match played 2 December 2017

=== Appearances and goals ===
No.	Pos	Nat	Player	Total		Tajik League		Tajik Cup		Super Cup		AFC Cup	
No.	Pos	Nat	Player	Apps	Goals	Apps	Goals	Apps	Goals	Apps	Goals	Apps	Goals
1	GK	(Serbia) SRB	Nikola Stošić	30	0	16	0	2	0	1	0	11	0
2	DF	(Tajikistan) TJK	Siyovush Asrorov	26	2	11+1	1	3	1	0	0	11	0
3	DF	(Tajikistan) TJK	Tabrezi Davlatmir	17	0	8+4	0	4	0	0	0	0+1	0
4	MF	(Ghana) GHA	David Mawutor	26	3	11	1	3+1	0	1	0	10	2
5	DF	(Ukraine) UKR	Artem Baranovskyi	28	1	15+1	1	2	0	1	0	9	0
6	DF	(Tajikistan) TJK	Oybek Abdugafforov	7	1	3+1	0	3	1	0	0	0	0
7	MF	(Tajikistan) TJK	Farhod Kosimov	6	0	2+2	0	1+1	0	0	0	0	0
8	MF	(Tajikistan) TJK	Nuriddin Davronov	20	4	7+3	2	1	0	1	0	8	2
9	FW	(Tajikistan) TJK	Jahongir Aliev	29	6	13+3	4	2	0	1	0	10	2
10	FW	(Russia) RUS	Dmitry Barkov	32	9	16+1	5	3	0	1	1	11	3
11	MF	(Tajikistan) TJK	Muhammadjon Rakhimov	13	1	3+3	0	3	1	0	0	0+4	0
14	FW	(Afghanistan) AFG	Khomid Golami	6	1	1+3	1	0+2	0	0	0	0	0
17	FW	(Tajikistan) TJK	Dilshod Vasiev	37	24	12+8	16	5	4	1	0	0+11	4
18	MF	(Tajikistan) TJK	Fatkhullo Fatkhuloev	35	8	17+2	7	3+1	1	1	0	11	0
19	DF	(Tajikistan) TJK	Akhtam Nazarov	31	4	15	3	2+2	0	1	0	11	1
20	MF	(Tajikistan) TJK	Amirbek Juraboev	34	3	16+3	1	4+1	2	1	0	5+4	0
21	MF	(Tajikistan) TJK	Romish Jalilov	31	3	14+2	1	4	1	1	0	7+3	1
23	MF	(Tajikistan) TJK	Ehson Panjshanbe	21	2	10+5	1	2+1	1	0	0	1+2	0
27	DF	(Ukraine) UKR	Oleksandr Stetsenko	17	0	7+1	0	4	0	0	0	5	0
35	GK	(Tajikistan) TJK	Kurban Boboev	11	0	5+3	0	3	0	0	0	0	0
56	DF	(Tajikistan) TJK	Alisher Safarov	2	0	0+2	0	0	0	0	0	0	0
63	FW	(Tajikistan) TJK	Manuchekhr Dzhalilov	31	25	12+5	15	1+1	3	1	0	11	7
Players away from Istiklol on loan:
Players who left Istiklol during the season:
7	DF	(Tajikistan) TJK	Farkhod Vosiyev	8	1	3+2	1	0	0	0	0	0+3	0
14	MF	(Tajikistan) TJK	Faridoon Sharipov	8	0	7+1	0	0	0	0	0	0	0
26	DF	(Tajikistan) TJK	Sokhib Suvonkulov	7	0	5+1	0	0	0	1	0	0	0
62	FW	(Tajikistan) TJK	Jahongir Ergashev	7	1	3+1	1	0	0	1	0	0+2	0

=== Goal scorers ===
Place	Position	Nation	Number	Name	Tajik League	Tajik Cup	Super Cup	AFC Cup	Total
1	FW	(Tajikistan)	63	Manuchekhr Dzhalilov	15	3	0	7	25
2	FW	(Tajikistan)	17	Dilshod Vasiev	16	4	0	4	24
3	FW	(Russia)	10	Dmitry Barkov	5	0	1	3	9
4	MF	(Tajikistan)	18	Fatkhullo Fatkhuloev	7	1	0	0	8
5	FW	(Tajikistan)	9	Jahongir Aliev	4	0	0	2	6
6	DF	(Tajikistan)	19	Akhtam Nazarov	3	0	0	1	4
6	MF	(Tajikistan)	8	Nuriddin Davronov	2	0	0	2	4
6				Own goal	3	0	0	1	4
9	DF	(Tajikistan)	21	Romish Jalilov	1	1	0	1	3
9	MF	(Ghana)	4	David Mawutor	1	0	0	2	3
9	MF	(Tajikistan)	20	Amirbek Juraboev	1	2	0	0	3
12	MF	(Tajikistan)	23	Ehson Panjshanbe	1	1	0	0	2
12	DF	(Tajikistan)	2	Siyovush Asrorov	1	1	0	0	2
14	FW	(Tajikistan)	62	Jahongir Ergashev	1	0	0	0	1
14	DF	(Ukraine)	5	Artem Baranovskyi	1	0	0	0	1
14	DF	(Tajikistan)	7	Farkhod Vosiyev	1	0	0	0	1
14	FW	(Afghanistan)	14	Khomid Golami	1	0	0	0	1
14	DF	(Tajikistan)	6	Oybek Abdugafforov	0	1	0	0	1
14	MF	(Tajikistan)	11	Muhammadjon Rakhimov	0	1	0	0	1
				TOTALS	64	15	1	23	103

=== Disciplinary record ===
Number	Nation	Position	Name	Tajik League		Tajik Cup		Super Cup		AFC Cup		Total	
Number	Nation	Position	Name	Booked	Sent off (straight red)	Booked	Sent off (straight red)	Booked	Sent off (straight red)	Booked	Sent off (straight red)	Booked	Sent off (straight red)
1	(Serbia)	GK	Nikola Stošić	0	0	1	0	0	0	0	0	1	0
2	(Tajikistan)	DF	Siyovush Asrorov	1	1	0	0	0	0	1	0	2	1
3	(Tajikistan)	DF	Tabrezi Davlatmir	4	0	0	0	0	0	0	0	4	0
4	(Ghana)	MF	David Mawutor	6	0	0	0	0	0	3	0	9	0
5	(Ukraine)	DF	Artem Baranovskyi	0	0	2	1	1	0	0	1	3	2
6	(Tajikistan)	DF	Oybek Abdugafforov	2	0	0	0	0	0	0	0	2	0
8	(Tajikistan)	MF	Nuriddin Davronov	1	0	1	0	0	0	1	0	3	0
9	(Tajikistan)	FW	Jahongir Aliev	0	0	0	0	0	0	3	0	3	0
10	(Russia)	FW	Dmitry Barkov	1	0	0	0	0	0	2	0	3	0
11	(Tajikistan)	MF	Muhammadjon Rakhimov	2	0	0	1	0	0	0	0	2	1
18	(Tajikistan)	MF	Fatkhullo Fatkhuloev	5	0	0	0	0	0	4	0	9	0
19	(Tajikistan)	DF	Akhtam Nazarov	1	0	0	0	0	0	2	0	3	0
20	(Tajikistan)	MF	Amirbek Juraboev	1	0	0	0	0	0	3	0	4	0
21	(Tajikistan)	MF	Romish Jalilov	2	0	2	0	0	0	4	1	8	1
23	(Tajikistan)	MF	Ehson Panjshanbe	5	0	0	1	0	0	0	0	5	1
26	(Tajikistan)	DF	Sokhib Suvonkulov	1	0	0	0	0	0	0	0	1	0
27	(Ukraine)	DF	Oleksandr Stetsenko	2	0	4	0	0	0	1	0	7	0
35	(Tajikistan)	GK	Kurban Boboev	1	0	0	0	0	0	0	0	1	0
63	(Tajikistan)	FW	Manuchekhr Dzhalilov	1	0	1	0	0	0	0	0	2	0
			TOTALS	36	1	11	3	1	0	24	2	72	6

== See also ==
- List of unbeaten football club seasons
