= 2018 Tajik Super Cup =

- Event: Tajik Super Cup
Istiklol	Khujand
3	2
- Date: 2 March 2018
- Venue: Central Stadium, Hisor
- Referee: Behrouz Murtazoev
- Attendance: 5,436

The 2018 Tajik Supercup was the 9th Tajik Supercup, an annual Tajik football match played between the winners of the previous season's Tajik League and Tajik Cup. The match was contested by 2017 Tajik League champions Istiklol, and the 2017 Tajik Cup champions Khujand. It was held at the Central Stadium in Hisor on 2 March 2018. Istiklol won the match 3–2 thanks to an extra-time winner from Nozim Babadjanov. Khujand led a 2-1 at halftime thanks to goals from Firdavs Chakalov and Agbley Jones, with Istiklol getting one back on the brink of halftime after Chakalov. I the second half Belarusian striker Mikalay Zyanko equalised for Istiklol sending the game in to extra time. At the beginning of the second-half of extra-time Nozim Babadjanov gave Istiklol the lead and completed their comeback to win their 7th Supercup.

== Match details ==
2 March 2018

Istiklol	3–2	Khujand
Chakalov 45' (o.g.); Zyanko 60'; Babadjanov 107'	Report	Chakalov 17'; A.Jones 31'

Central Stadium, Hisor
Attendance: 5,436
Referee: Behrouz Murtazoev

Istiklol	Khujand

GK	1	(Serbia) Nikola Stošić
DF	2	(Tajikistan) Siyovush Asrorov
DF	5	(Ukraine) Artem Baranovskyi
DF	19	(Tajikistan) Akhtam Nazarov	Booked
MF	7	(Belarus) Sergey Tikhonovsky
MF	11	(Tajikistan) Muhammadjoni Hasan		(substituted off) 46'
MF	18	(Tajikistan) Fatkhullo Fatkhuloev		(substituted off) 119'
MF	20	(Tajikistan) Amirbek Juraboev		(substituted off) 109'
MF	21	(Tajikistan) Romish Jalilov
FW	9	(Belarus) Mikalay Zyanko
FW	17	(Tajikistan) Dilshod Vasiev		(substituted off) 78'
Substitutes:
MF	13	(Tajikistan) Nozim Babadjanov		(substituted in) 46'
FW	22	(Tajikistan) Sheriddin Boboev		(substituted in) 78'
DF	3	(Tajikistan) Tabrezi Davlatmir		(substituted in) 109'
FW	14	(Tajikistan) Komron Tursunov		(substituted in) 119'
Manager:
(Tajikistan) Mukhsin Mukhamadiev

GK	88	(Estonia) Aleksei Matrosov
DF	5	(Tajikistan) Firdavs Chakalov
DF	19	(Tajikistan) Khurshed Beknazarov
DF	22	(Tajikistan) Manouchehr Ahmadov
DF	24	(Tajikistan) Daler Tukhtasunov
MF	8	(Tajikistan) Ehson Boboev		(substituted off) 73'
MF	21	(Tajikistan) Khikmatullo Rasulov		(substituted off) 88'
MF		(Tajikistan) Bakhtiyor Choriyev
MF		(Tajikistan) Furkatjon Khasanboev		(substituted off) 59'
FW	20	(Ghana) Agbley Jones		(substituted off) 64'
FW	62	(Tajikistan) Jahongir Ergashev
Substitutes:
DF		(Tajikistan) Hasan Rustamov	Booked	(substituted in) 59'
FW		(Tajikistan) Farkhod Tokhirov		(substituted in) 64'
		(Tajikistan) Abdusamad Khadzhibaev		(substituted in) 73'
		(Tajikistan) Mekhrozh Sharifzoda		(substituted in) 88'
Manager:

== See also ==
- 2017 Tajik League
- 2017 Tajik Cup
