= 2017 Tajik League =

Tajik League
- Season: 2017
- Champions: Istiklol
- Relegated: Khosilot Farkhor
- AFC Cup: Istiklol, Khujand
- Matches: 84
- Goals: 227 (2.7 per match)

The 2017 Tajik League is the 26th season of Tajik League, the Tajikistan Football Federation's top division of association football. FC Istiklol are the defending champions, having won the previous season.

== Teams ==
On 8 February 2017, the Tajikistan Football Federation announced that the season would involve eight teams, with Khayr Vahdat, Parvoz and Ravshan dropping out of the league, and Panjshir gaining promotion.

Locations of teams in the 2017 Tajik League

Team	Location	Venue	Capacity
Barkchi	Hisor	Central Republican Stadium	24,000
CSKA Pomir Dushanbe	Dushanbe	CSKA Stadium	7,000
Istiklol	Dushanbe	Central Republican Stadium	24,000
Hosilot Farkhor	Farkhor	Central Stadium	12,000
Khujand	Khujand	20-Letie Nezavisimosti Stadium	20,000
Panjshir	Balkh	Panjshir Uktam Mamatova	8,500
Regar-TadAZ	Tursunzoda	Stadium Metallurg 1st District	20,000
Vakhsh Qurghonteppa	Qurghonteppa	Tsentralnyi Stadium	10,000

=== Managerial changes ===
Team	Outgoing manager	Manner of departure	Date of vacancy	Position in table	Incoming manager	Date of appointment
Istiklol	(Serbia) Nikola Lazarević	End of Contract	31 December 2016	Pre-Season	(Tajikistan) Mukhsin Mukhamadiev	1 January 2017
Khujand	(Tajikistan) Numonjon Yusupov			Pre-Season	(Tajikistan) Rustam Khodzhaev	3 February 2017
Barkchi	(Tajikistan) Vitaliy Levchenko	Resigned	3 June 2017	7th	(Tajikistan) Mubin Ergashev	9 June 2017

== League table ==
Pos	Team	Pld	W	D	L	GF	GA	GD	Pts	Qualification or relegation
1	Istiklol (C)	21	17	4	0	64	14	+50	55	2018 AFC Cup
2	Khujand	21	11	4	6	44	22	+22	37	2018 AFC Cup
3	CSKA Pamir Dushanbe	21	8	10	3	19	13	+6	34	
4	Regar-TadAZ	21	6	6	9	22	23	−1	24	
5	Barki Tajik	21	6	6	9	20	27	−7	24	
6	Vakhsh Qurghonteppa	21	5	7	9	17	28	−11	22	
7	Panjshir	21	5	4	12	25	48	−23	19	Qualification for relegation play-offs
8	Khosilot Farkhor (R)	21	4	3	14	17	55	−38	15	Relegation to Tajik First Division

Updated to match(es) played on 27 November 2017. Source: Fifa
Rules for classification: 1) points; 2) goal difference; 3) number of goals scored.
(C) Champions; (R) Relegated

=== Results 1–14 ===
Home \ Away	BTD	CPD	IST	KHO	KJD	PAN	RZD	VAK
Barki Tajik		0–0	0–6	2–1	1–1	0–1	0–1	0–0
CSKA Pamir	1–0		0–4	1–0	0–0	1–0	2–0	1–1
Istiklol	2–2	3–0		8–2	3–0	2–1	0–0	2–0
Khosilot Farkhor	0–1	0–4	0–0		2–1	3–2	1–1	0–0
Khujand	1–0	0–0	1–2	7–0		2–1	3–0	2–0
Panjshir	2–3	0–0	1–6	0–3	0–5		1–0	6–2
Regar-TadAZ	1–2	0–0	1–1	0–1	2–1	1–1		1–0
Vakhsh Qurghonteppa	0–0	0–0	1–5	2–0	1–4	0–1	2–1	

Updated to match(es) played on 31 July 2017. Source: Soccerway
Legend: Blue = home team win; Yellow = draw; Red = away team win.

=== Results 15–21 ===
Home \ Away	BTD	CPD	IST	KHO	KJD	PAN	RZD	VAK
Barki Tajik			0–2	5–1		3–3		
CSKA Pamir	1–0				1–0		1–1	
Istiklol		2–0			5–4		2–0	1–0
Khosilot Farkhor		0–4	1–3		0–4			0–2
Khujand	2–0					2–1	3–2	1–1
Panjshir		1–1	0–5	2–1				
Regar-TadAZ	1–0			3–0		6–0		0–2
Vakhsh Qurghonteppa	0–1	1–1				2–1		

Updated to match(es) played on 27 November 2017. Source: Soccerway
Legend: Blue = home team win; Yellow = draw; Red = away team win.

=== Relegation play-offs ===
22 November 2017

Eshata	1 – 1	Panjshir

Khujand

26 November 2017

Panjshir	3 – 2	Eshata
Khasan Kholov 27'; Alisher Salimov 49'; Farrukh Fuzailov 62' (yellow card); Abdulatif Tojiahmedov (yellow card)	Report	Abdumalik Chodiev 41' (pen.); Juraboy Isoev 60'; Abdurahmon Uzokov (yellow card) (yellow-red card) 74'; Muzaffar Bobodzhonov (yellow card)

Panjshir Uktam Mamatova, Kolkhozobod
Attendance: 2,000
Referee: Abdurashid Murodov

== Matches ==
=== Week 1 ===
5 March 2017	Regar-TadAZ	1–1	Panjshir	Dushanbe
(UTC+5)	Firuz Rakhmatov 16'	Report	Hussein Umarov 1'	Stadium: Central Republican Stadium Reserve Field; Attendance: 200; Referee: Behrouz Murtazoev

5 March 2017	Vakhsh	0–0	CSKA Pamir Dushanbe	Dushanbe
(UTC+5)		Report		Stadium: Central Republican Stadium Reserve Field; Attendance: 150; Referee: Abdurashid Murodov

8 March 2017	Khosilot Farkhor	2–1	Khujand	Kulob
(UTC+5)	Rustamov 59'; Agbley Jones 89'	Report	Dilshod Bozorov 34'	Stadium: Central Stadium; Attendance: 7,526; Referee: Sayojon Zainiddinov

8 March 2017	Istiklol	6–0	Barki Tajik	Dushanbe
18:30 (UTC+5)	Dzhalilov 9', 29', 43'; Barkov 20', 84'; Aliev 44'	Report		Stadium: Central Republican Stadium; Attendance: 200; Referee: Khusrawi

=== Week 2 ===
12 March 2017	Khujand	2–0	Vakhsh	Khujand
(UTC+5)	Dilshod Bozorov 33' (pen.); Tukhtasunov 66'	Report		Stadium: 20 Years of Independence Stadium; Attendance: 2,000; Referee: Nasrullo Kabirov

12 March 2017	Barki Tajik	0–1	Regar-TadAZ	Hissar
(UTC+5)		Report	Firuz Rakhmatov 65'	Stadium: Central Stadium; Attendance: 2,000; Referee: Khurshed Dadoboev

13 March 2017	Panjshir	0–3	Khosilot Farkhor	Hissar
(UTC+5)		Report	Hasan 33'; Agbley Jones 82'; Navruz Rustamov 84'	Stadium: Central Stadium; Attendance: 2,000; Referee: Khusrawi Siddiqzod

27 April 2017	Istiklol	3–0	CSKA Pamir Dushanbe	Dushanbe
16:30 (UTC+5)	Dzhalilov 31', 60' (pen.); D.Vasiev 90+3'	Report		Stadium: FFT Academy; Attendance: 300; Referee: Khusrawi Siddikzod

=== Week 3 ===
18 March 2017	Istiklol	0–0	Regar-TadAZ	Dushanbe
15:00 (UTC+5)		Report		Stadium: Central Republican Stadium; Attendance: 300; Referee: Nasrullo Kabirov

18 March 2017	Barki Tajik	2–1	Khosilot Farkhor	Hissar
(UTC+5)	Shahdom Samiev 27'; Vakhdat Khanonov 81'	Report	Khairullo Azizov 17'	Stadium: Central Stadium; Attendance: 1,500; Referee: Behrouz Murtazoev

18 March 2017	CSKA Pamir Dushanbe	0–0	Khujand	Dushanbe
(UTC+5)		Report		Stadium: Central Republican Stadium Reserve Field; Attendance: 200; Referee: Sayvali Turdiyev

19 March 2017	Vakhsh	0–1	Panjshir	Dushanbe
(UTC+5)		Report	Sorbonne Avgonov 90+3'	Stadium: Central Republican Stadium Reserve Field; Attendance: 200; Referee: Sayojon Zainiddinov

=== Week 4 ===
1 April 2017	Regar-TadAZ	0–1	Khosilot Farkhor	Dushanbe
(UTC+5)		Report	Safarali Karimov 70' (pen.)	Stadium: Central Republican Stadium Reserve Field; Attendance: 1,200; Referee: Sayvali Turdiyev

1 April 2017	Panjshir	0–0	CSKA Pamir Dushanbe	Kolkhozobod
(UTC+5)		Report		Stadium: Panjshir Uktam Mamatova; Attendance: 4,200; Referee: Khurshed Dadoboev

2 April 2017	Barki Tajik	0–0	Vakhsh	Dushanbe
(UTC+5)		Report		Stadium: Central Republican Stadium; Attendance: 300; Referee: Khusrawi Siddiqzod

8 May 2017	Khujand	1–2	Istiklol	Khujand
16:30 (UTC+5)	Ahmadov 83'	Report	Baranovskyi 13'; F.Vosiyev 68'	Stadium: 20 Years of Independence Stadium; Attendance: 2,100; Referee: Saivali Turdiev

=== Week 5 ===
8 April 2017	Vakhsh	2–1	Regar-TadAZ	Qurghonteppa
(UTC+5)	Khudoydod Uzokov 47'; Daler Umarov 55'	Report	Khotimskiy 72'	Stadium: Tsentralnyi Stadium; Attendance: 1,100; Referee: Sayojon Zainiddinov

8 April 2017	Khujand	2–1	Panjshir	Khujand
(UTC+5)	Dilshod Bozorov 24'; Ahmadov 45+2'	Report	Abdukhalil Boronov 19'	Stadium: 20 Years of Independence Stadium; Attendance: 601; Referee: Behrouz Murtazoev

9 April 2017	CSKA Pamir Dushanbe	1–0	Barki Tajik	Dushanbe
(UTC+5)	Sharafjon Solekhov 56'	Report		Stadium: Aviator Stadium; Attendance: 1,000; Referee: Khusrawi Siddiqzod

10 April 2017	Istiklol	8–2	Khosilot Farkhor	Dushanbe
18:30 (UTC+5)	Dzhalilov 11' (pen.), 34', 49', 52'; Davronov 12'; Nazarov 39'; Aliev 53'; D.Vasiev 56'	Report	A.Jones 19'; S.Gaforov 80'	Stadium: Central Republican Stadium; Attendance: 2,500; Referee: Behrouz Murtazoev

=== Week 6 ===
14 April 2017	Istiklol	2–1	Panjshir	Dushanbe
18:30 (UTC+5)	Dzhalilov 20' (pen.); Barkov 66'	Report	B.Niyozov 57'	Stadium: Central Republican Stadium; Attendance: 500; Referee: Sayvali Turdiyev

15 April 2017	Regar-TadAZ	0–0	CSKA Pamir Dushanbe	Tursunzoda
(UTC+5)		Report		Stadium: TALCO Arena; Attendance: 3,000; Referee: Umed Rakhimov

16 April 2017	Barki Tajik	1–1	Khujand	Dushanbe
(UTC+5)	Daler Yodgorov 11'	Report	Tokhirov 69'	Stadium: Central Republican Stadium Reserve Field; Attendance: 300; Referee: Abdurashid Murodov

16 April 2017	Khosilot Farkhor	0–0	Vakhsh	Farkhar
(UTC+5)		Report		Stadium: Central Stadium; Attendance: 3,000; Referee: Khurshed Dadoboev

=== Week 7 ===
22 April 2017	Khujand	3–0	Regar-TadAZ	Khujand
(UTC+5)	Tukhtasunov 30'; Tokhirov 60', 70'	Report		Stadium: 20 Years of Independence Stadium; Attendance: 700; Referee: Sayojon Zainiddinov

22 April 2017	Panjshir	2–3	Barki Tajik	Kolkhozobod
(UTC+5)	Firdavs Zaynullozoda 35'; Alisheri Hotam 86'	Report	Boboev 13'; Shahrom Samiev 37'; Ziyovuddin Fuzailov 90+1'	Stadium: Panjshir Uktam Mamatova; Attendance: 4,000; Referee: Umed Rakhimov

23 April 2017	CSKA Pamir Dushanbe	1–0	Khosilot Farkhor	Dushanbe
(UTC+5)	Gershon Akuffo 87'	Report		Stadium: Aviator Stadium; Attendance: 500; Referee: Sayvali Turdiyev

23 April 2017	Istiklol	2–0	Vakhsh Qurghonteppa	Dushanbe
18:30 (UTC+5)	Fatkhuloev 9'; Ergashev 26'	Report		Stadium: Central Republican Stadium; Attendance: 200; Referee: Behrouz Murtazoev

=== Week 8 ===
29 April 2017	Barki Tajik	0–1	Panjshir	Dushanbe
(UTC+5)		Report	Abduhalil Boronov 64' (pen.)	Stadium: Central Republican Stadium Reserve Field; Attendance: 300; Referee: Sayojon Zainiddinov

30 April 2017	Regar-TadAZ	2–1	Khujand	Tursunzoda
(UTC+5)	Dorogjon Ergashev 7'; Sherzod Mahamadiev 45'	Report	Ahmadov 71' (pen.)	Stadium: TALCO Arena; Attendance: 2,000; Referee: Sayvali Turdiyev

30 April 2017	Khosilot Farkhor	0–4	CSKA Pamir Dushanbe	Farkhar
(UTC+5)		Report	Mehdi Jalizi 22', 40'; Comroni Mirzonajot 43'; Sharafjon Solekhov 53'	Stadium: Central Stadium; Attendance: 2,000; Referee: Nekruz Umarov

29 June 2017	Vakhsh Qurghonteppa	1–5	Istiklol	Qurghonteppa
(UTC+5)	Davlatmir 77' (o.g.)	Report	H.Beknazarov 44' (o.g.); A.Juraboev 66'; Panjshanbe 72'; Dzhalilov 75'; Vasiev 84'	Stadium: Tsentralnyi Stadium; Referee: Abdurashid Murodov

=== Week 9 ===
5 May 2017	Khujand	1–0	Barki Tajik	Khujand
(UTC+5)	Dilshod Bozorov 59'	Report		Stadium: 20 Years of Independence Stadium; Attendance: 1,200; Referee: Behrouz Murtazoev

6 May 2017	CSKA Pamir Dushanbe	2–0	Regar-TadAZ	Dushanbe
(UTC+5)	Mehdi Jalizi 7'; Chakalov 26'	Report		Stadium: CSKA Stadium; Attendance: 500; Referee: Khurshed Dadoboev

7 May 2017	Vakhsh	2–0	Khosilot Farkhor	Qurghonteppa
(UTC+5)	Holmurod Nazarov 61', 78'	Report		Stadium: Tsentralnyi Stadium; Attendance: 2,000; Referee: Khusrawi Siddiqzod

21 June 2017	Panjshir	1–6	Istiklol	Kolkhozobod
(UTC+5)	A.Boron 75' (pen.)	Report	Fatkhuloev 15'; D.Vasiev 18', 37'; Mawutor 27'; Aliev 38'; Nazarov 52'	Stadium: Panjshir Uktam Mamatova; Attendance: 4,000; Referee: Khusrawi Sidddikzod

=== Week 10 ===
12 May 2017	Khosilot Farkhor	0–0	Istiklol	Farkhar
16:30 (UTC+5)		Report		Stadium: Central Stadium; Attendance: 5,000; Referee: Behrouz Murtazoev

14 May 2017	Regar-TadAZ	1–0	Vakhsh	Tursunzoda
(UTC+5)	Askar Ravshanov 90'	Report		Stadium: TALCO Arena; Attendance: 1,600; Referee: Nasrullo Kabirov

14 May 2017	Barki Tajik	0–0	CSKA Pamir Dushanbe	Dushanbe
(UTC+5)		Report		Stadium: Central Republican Stadium Reserve Field; Attendance: 200; Referee: Sayvali Turdiyev

14 May 2017	Panjshir	0–5	Khujand	Kolkhozobod
(UTC+5)		Report	Khodzhiboy Ziyoyev 18'; Tukhtasunov 47'; Shokhrukh Rajamatov 59'; Tokhirov 84'; Dilshod Bozorov 90+2'	Stadium: Panjshir Uktam Mamatova; Attendance: 2,500; Referee: Behrouz Murtazoev

=== Week 11 ===
18 May 2017	Vakhsh	0–0	Barki Tajik	Qurghonteppa
(UTC+5)		Report		Stadium: Tsentralnyi Stadium; Attendance: 2,500; Referee: Khurshed Dadoboev

20 May 2017	CSKA Pamir Dushanbe	1–0	Panjshir	Dushanbe
(UTC+5)	Chakalov 85'	Report		Stadium: CSKA Stadium; Attendance: 600; Referee: Nasrullo Kabirov

21 May 2017	Khosilot Farkhor	1–1	Regar-TadAZ	Farkhar
(UTC+5)	Jomron Tursunov 46'	Report	Shodibek Gafforov 52'	Stadium: Central Stadium; Attendance: 2,300; Referee: Sayojon Zainiddinov

25 May 2017	Istiklol	3–0	Khujand	Dushanbe
20:00 (UTC+5)	Jalilov 10'; Barkov 49'; S.Khakimov 59' (o.g.)	Report		Stadium: Central Republican Stadium; Attendance: 500; Referee: Khusrawi Siddikzod

=== Week 12 ===
17 June 2017	Khosilot Farkhor	0–1	Barki Tajik	Farkhar
(UTC+5)		Report	Muhsinjon Parpiev 56'	Stadium: Central Stadium; Attendance: 2,000; Referee: Khusrawi Siddiqzod

17 June 2017	Panjshir	6–2	Vakhsh	Kolkhozobod
(UTC+5)	Hussein Umarov 22', 45+1'; Abdukhalil Boronov 40'; Gurez Aslonov 51' (o.g.); Alisher Salimov 65'; Khasan Kholov 87'	Report	Parviz Ahunov 82'; Umarjon Sharipov 90+1'	Stadium: Panjshir Uktam Mamatova; Attendance: 1,000; Referee: Sayojon Zainiddinov

18 June 2017	Khujand	0–0	CSKA Pamir Dushanbe	Khujand
(UTC+5)		Report		Stadium: 20 Years of Independence Stadium; Attendance: 1,000; Referee: Nekruz Umarov

18 June 2017	Regar-TadAZ	1–1	Istiklol	Tursunzoda
18:00 (UTC+5)	F.Rakhmatov 23'	Report	Fatkhuloev 45'	Stadium: TALCO Arena; Attendance: 3,000; Referee: Behrouz Murtazoev

=== Week 13 ===
24 June 2017	Khosilot Farkhor	3–2	Panjshir	Farkhar
(UTC+5)	Jonibek Muminov 18'; Hasan 47', 79'	Report	Firdavs Zaynulozoda 16'; Khasan Kholov 39'	Stadium: Central Stadium; Attendance: 3,000; Referee: Khurshed Dadoboev

25 June 2017	Vakhsh	1–4	Khujand	Qurghonteppa
(UTC+5)	Umarjon Sharipov 47'	Report	Dilshod Bozorov 8', 88'; Tokhirov 25', 66'	Stadium: Tsentralnyi Stadium; Attendance: 500; Referee: Behrouz Murtazoev

25 June 2017	CSKA Pamir Dushanbe	0–4	Istiklol	Dushanbe
18:00 (UTC+5)		Report	Vasiev 13' (pen.); Fatkhuloev 41'; Dzhalilov 69', 90+2'	Stadium: CSKA Stadium; Attendance: 300; Referee: Sayodzhon Zayniddinov

29 June 2017	Regar-TadAZ	1–2	Barki Tajik	Tursunzoda
(UTC+5)	Numon Zokirov 88'	Report	Karomatullo Saidov 15' (pen.), 49'	Stadium: TALCO Arena; Attendance: 2,500; Referee: Nasrullo Kabirov

=== Week 14 ===
29 July 2017	Panjshir	1–0	Regar-TadAZ	Kolkhozobod
(UTC+5)	Akram Kurbonov 42'	Report		Stadium: Panjshir Uktam Mamatova; Attendance: 4,000; Referee: Khusrawi Siddiqzod

29 July 2017	CSKA Pamir Dushanbe	1–1	Vakhsh	Qurghonteppa
(UTC+5)	Chakalov 57'	Report	Rustamov 45+2' (pen.)	Stadium: Tsentralnyi Stadium; Attendance: 500; Referee: Nasrullo Kabirov

30 July 2017	Khujand	7–0	Khosilot Farkhor	Khujand
(UTC+5)	Ahmadov 2'; Tukhtasunov 16', 35'; Dilshod Bozorov 65'; Tokhirov 79'; Ergashev 82'; Ehson Boboev 89'	Report		Stadium: 20 Years of Independence Stadium; Attendance: 1,200; Referee: Sayojon Zainiddinov

19 November 2017	Istiklol	2–2	Barki Tajik	Hisor
14:00 (UTC+5)	Vasiev 12' (pen.); Fatkhuloev 37'	Report	Boboev 79'; S.Samiev 88'	Stadium: Central Stadium; Attendance: 200; Referee: Gulmurody Sadullo

=== Week 15 ===
3 August 2017	Regar-TadAZ	1–0	Barki Tajik	Tursunzoda
(UTC+5)	Saidmuhtor Azimov 28' (o.g.)	Report		Stadium: TALCO Arena; Attendance: 1,500; Referee: Behrouz Murtazoev

3 August 2017	Istiklol	1–0	Vakhsh Qurghonteppa	Hisor
20:00 (UTC+5)	Barkov 52'	Report		Stadium: Central Stadium; Attendance: 1,500; Referee: Sayojon Zainiddinov

5 August 2017	Khosilot Farkhor	0–4	CSKA Pamir Dushanbe	Farkhar
(UTC+5)		Report	Abdukhalil Boronov 19'; Rasul Paizov 66'; Z.Juraboev 75'; Hazoo Oto 81'	Stadium: Central Stadium; Attendance: 2,500; Referee: Umed Rakhimov

5 August 2017	Khujand	2–1	Panjshir	Khujand
(UTC+5)	Tukhtasunov 20', 51'	Report	Shavkati Hotam 86'	Stadium: 20 Years of Independence Stadium; Attendance: 2,500; Referee: Khusrawi Siddiqzod

=== Week 16 ===
12 August 2017	Vakhsh	2–1	Panjshir	Qurghonteppa
(UTC+5)	Farrukh Fusailov 35'; Abdulatif Tojiahmedov 88' (o.g.)	Report	Otabek Karimov 44'	Stadium: Tsentralnyi Stadium; Attendance: 3,000; Referee: Khurshed Dadoboev

12 August 2017	CSKA Pamir Dushanbe	1–0	Khujand	Dushanbe
(UTC+5)	Chakalov 45+2'	Report		Stadium: CSKA Stadium; Attendance: 2,000; Referee: Sayojon Zainiddinov

14 August 2017	Istiklol	2–0	Regar-TadAZ	Hisor
(UTC+5)	Vasiev 82'; Dzhalilov 85'	Report		Stadium: Central Stadium; Attendance: 2,000; Referee: Behrouz Murtazoev

30 August 2017	Barki Tajik	5–1	Khosilot Farkhor	Hisor
(UTC+5)	Boboev 36', 83'; Tohir Malodustov 46', 47'; Shahrom Samiev 65'	Report	Bahrom Izomov 21'	Stadium: Central Stadium; Attendance: 100; Referee: Nasrullo Kabirov

=== Week 17 ===
19 August 2017	Regar-TadAZ	0–2	Vakhsh	Tursunzoda
(UTC+5)		Report	Umarjon Sharipov 35'; Otabek Karimov 72'	Stadium: TALCO Arena; Attendance: 1,500; Referee: Sayojon Zainiddinov

19 August 2017	Panjshir	1–1	CSKA Pamir Dushanbe	Kolkhozobod
(UTC+5)	Alisher Salimov 53'	Report	Z.Juraboev 63'	Stadium: Panjshir Uktam Mamatova; Attendance: 2,000; Referee: Behrouz Murtazoev

18 October 2017	Khujand	2–0	Barki Tajik	Khujand
(UTC+5)	Dilshod Bozorov 29'; Ehson Boboev 38'	Report		Stadium: 20 Years of Independence Stadium; Attendance: 1,000; Referee: Behrouz Murtazoev

27 November 2017	Khosilot Farkhor	1–3	Istiklol	Farkhar
14:00 (UTC+5)	K.Azizov (penalty missed) 90+1' 90+1'	Report	Vasiev 36', 50', 69'	Stadium: Central Stadium; Attendance: 800; Referee: Sayvali Turdiev

=== Week 18 ===
23 August 2017	Vakhsh	1–1	CSKA Pamir Dushanbe	Qurghonteppa
(UTC+5)	Daler Umarov 37'	Report	Orzu Dodhudoev 8'	Stadium: Tsentralnyi Stadium; Attendance: 1,000; Referee: Khurshed Dadoboev

23 August 2017	Barki Tajik	3–3	Panjshir	Hisor
(UTC+5)	Tohir Malodustov 2'; Daler Yodgorov 57'; Boboev 70'	Report	Khasan Kholov 30'; Sorbon Avgonov 64'; Shavkati Hotam 90+1'	Stadium: Central Stadium; Attendance: 300; Referee: Khusrawi Siddiqzod

23 August 2017	Regar-TadAZ	3–0	Khosilot Farkhor	Tursunzoda
(UTC+5)	Choriyev 29', 48'; Jomron Tursunov 65' (pen.)	Report		Stadium: TALCO Arena; Attendance: 3,000; Referee: Sayvali Turdiyev

25 October 2017 18	Istiklol	5–4	Khujand	Hisor
18:00 (UTC+5)	K.Beknazarov 19' (o.g.); K.Golami 21'; Vasiev 34', 53'; Dzhalilov 88'	Report	Tukhtasunov 41', 77'; Ahmadov 64'; A.Khodjiboev 81'	Stadium: Central Stadium; Referee: Abdurashid Murodov

=== Week 19 ===
8 September 2017	CSKA Pamir Dushanbe	1–0	Barki Tajik	Dushanbe
(UTC+5)	Surov 15'	Report		Stadium: CSKA Stadium; Attendance: 300; Referee: Sayvali Turdiyev

17 September 2017	Khujand	3–2	Regar-TadAZ	Khujand
(UTC+5)	Ahmadov 19', 90+8' (pen.); Jomron Tursunov 36'	Report	Khurshed Beknazarov 52'; Shodibek Gafforov 76'	Stadium: 20 Years of Independence Stadium; Attendance: 2,000; Referee: Sayvali Turdiyev

18 September 2017	Istiklol	5–0	Panjshir	Hisor
19:00 (UTC+5)	Fatkhuloev 37', 90'; Davronov 45' (pen.); Vasiev 47'; Aliev 85'	Report		Stadium: Central Stadium; Attendance: 500; Referee: Abdurashid Murodov

7 October 2017	Khosilot Farkhor	0–2	Vakhsh Qurghonteppa	Farkhar
(UTC+5)		Report	Parviz Ahunov 18'; Rustamov 37'	Stadium: Central Stadium; Attendance: 1,000; Referee: Khurshed Dadoboev

=== Week 20 ===
23 September 2017	Regar-TadAZ	6–0	Panjshir	Tursunzoda
(UTC+5)	Jomron Tursunov 12', 25', 78', 90+1'; Makhmudov 15'; Saidhoni Amrohon 71'	Report		Stadium: TALCO Arena; Attendance: 1,000; Referee: Nasrullo Kabirov

23 September 2017	Khosilot Farkhor	0–4	Khujand	Farkhar
(UTC+5)		Report	Hikmatullo Rasulov 30'; Khurshed Beknazarov 42'; Ergashev 62'; Ahmadov 79'	Stadium: Central Stadium; Attendance: 500; Referee: Nekruz Umarov

12 October 2017	Vakhsh	0–1	Barki Tajik	Qurghonteppa
(UTC+5)		Report	Daler Yodgorov 57'	Stadium: Tsentralnyi Stadium; Attendance: 250; Referee: Gulmurody Sadullo

25 November 2017	Istiklol	2–0	CSKA Pamir Dushanbe	Dushanbe
14:00 (UTC+5)	Asrorov 60'; Nazarov 87'	Report		Stadium: Central Republican Stadium; Attendance: 300; Referee: Khurshed Dadaboev

=== Week 21 ===
21 October 2017	CSKA Pamir Dushanbe	1–1	Regar-TadAZ	Dushanbe
(UTC+5)	Z.Juraboev 49'	Report	Jomron Tursunov 23' (pen.)	Stadium: CSKA Stadium; Attendance: 250; Referee: Nasrullo Kabirov

21 October 2017	Panjshir	2–1	Khosilot Farkhor	Kolkhozobod
(UTC+5)	Alisher Salimov 63'; Ravshan Azizov 65'	Report	Ismoil Kodirov 29'	Stadium: Panjshir Uktam Mamatova; Attendance: 3,000; Referee: Sayvali Turdiyev

21 October 2017	Khujand	1–1	Vakhsh	Khujand
(UTC+5)	Sharipov 59'	Report	Dilshod Bozorov 3'	Stadium: 20 Years of Independence Stadium; Attendance: 1,500; Referee: Sayojon Zainiddinov

23 November 2017	Barki Tajik	0–2	Istiklol	Hisor
14:00 (UTC+5)		Report	Vasiev 66', 74'	Stadium: Central Stadium; Attendance: 200; Referee: Abdurashid Murodov

== Season statistics ==
=== Scoring ===
- First goal of the season: Hussein Umarov for Panjshir against Regar-TadAZ (5 March 2017)

=== Top scorers ===
As of match played 27 November 2017

Rank	Player	Club	Goals
1	(Tajikistan) Dilshod Vasiev	Istiklol	16
2	(Tajikistan) Manuchekhr Dzhalilov	Istiklol	15
3	(Tajikistan) Dilshod Bozorov	Khujand	9
3	(Tajikistan) Davrondzhon Tuhtasunov	Khujand	9
5	(Tajikistan) Manouchehr Ahmadov	Khujand	8
5	(Tajikistan) Komron Tursunov	Regar-TadAZ	8
7	(Tajikistan) Farkhod Tokhirov	Khujand	7
7	(Tajikistan) Fatkhullo Fatkhuloev	Istiklol	7
9	(Russia) Dmitry Barkov	Istiklol	5
9	(Tajikistan) Abdukhalil Boron	Panjshir/CSKA Pamir Dushanbe	5
9	(Tajikistan) Sheriddin Boboev	Barki Tajik	5

=== Hat-tricks ===
Player	For	Against	Result	Date	Ref
(Tajikistan) Manuchekhr Dzhalilov	Istiklol	Barki Tajik	6-0	8 March 2017	
(Tajikistan) Manuchekhr Dzhalilov^{4}	Istiklol	Khosilot Farkhor	8-2	11 April 2017	
(Tajikistan) Jomron Tursunov^{4}	Regar-TadAZ	Panjshir	6-0	23 September 2017	
