= 2010 Tajikistan Cup =

2010 Tajik Cup
Tournament details
- Country: Tajikistan

Final positions
- Champions: Istiklol
- Runners-up: Khujand

The 2010 Tajik Cup was the 19th edition of the Tajik Cup.

== Quarterfinals ==
Team 1	Agg.	Team 2	1st leg	2nd leg
Regar-TadAZ	3-1	Khayr Vahdat	2-0	1-1
Shodmon	2-5	Rangongaz Rudaki	1-1	1-4
Khujand	9-0	Hylbyk Vose	3-0	6–0
Istiklol	4-3	Energetik Dushanbe	3-3	1–0

== Semifinals ==
Team 1	Agg.	Team 2	1st leg	2nd leg
Khujand	6-4	Rangongaz Rudaki	4-3	2-1
Istiklol	4-4	Regar-TadAZ	3–0	1-4

== Final ==
5 October 2010
(UTC+5)

Khujand	0–5	Istiklol
	Report	Vasiev 20', 48'; Rabiev 31'; Fatkhuloev 57'; Tokhirov 85'

Central Republican Stadium, Dushanbe
Attendance: 2,000
Referee: Orif Juraev
