= Jahongir Aliev =

Tajik association football player

Jahongir Aliev: Джахонгир Алиев
Personal information
- Full name: Jahongir Şavkatovič Aliev
- Date of birth: 14 July 1996 (age 30)
- Place of birth: Dushanbe, Tajikistan
- Height: 1.78 m (5 ft 10 in)
- Position: Midfielder

Team information
- Current team: Ravshan Zafarobod
- Number: 18

Youth career
- –2011: Kayrakkum

Senior career*
Years	Team	Apps	(Gls)
2012–2014	Parvoz Bobojon Ghafurov		
2013	→ Khujand (loan)		
2015	Khujand	18	(7)
2016–2017	Istiklol	28	(11)
2018	Nasaf	8	(0)
2018–2019	Khujand		
2021	Khujand		
2022–	Ravshan Zafarobod		

International career^{‡}
2014	Tajikistan U17	5	(1)
2015–2016	Tajikistan U21	12	(4)
2015–	Tajikistan	14	(0)
- * Club domestic league appearances and goals as of 7 July 2020 ‡ National team caps and goals as of 27 March 2018

Jahongir Şavkatovič Aliev (Tajik: Ҷаҳонгир Шавкатович Алиев; born 14 July 1996) is a Tajik international footballer who plays as a midfielder for Ravshan Zafarobod.

== Club career ==
On 11 January 2016, FC Istiklol announced that they had signed Aliev on a three-year contract from Khujand in preparation for their 2016 AFC Cup campaign.

In January 2018, Aliev went on trial with Uzbekistan Super League side Nasaf Qarshi, signing a one-year contract with the club on 15 January. In June 2018, he left Nasaf Qarshi.

On 3 July 2018, Aliev re-signed for FK Khujand.

== International career ==
Aliev made his debut for Tajikistan on 13 October 2015 against Jordan.

== Career statistics ==
=== Club ===
As of 12 June 2018

Club	Season	League			National Cup		Continental		Other		Total	
Club	Season	Division	Apps	Goals	Apps	Goals	Apps	Goals	Apps	Goals	Apps	Goals
Istiklol	2016	Tajik League	12	7	6	1	3	0	1	0	22	8
Istiklol	2017	Tajik League	16	4	2	0	10	2	1	0	29	6
Istiklol	Total		28	11	8	1	13	2	2	0	51	14
Nasaf Qarshi	2018	Uzbekistan Super League	8	0	1	0	3	0	–		12	0
Career total			36	11	9	1	16	2	2	0	63	14

=== International ===
As of 27 March 2018

Tajikistan national team
Year	Apps	Goals
2015	2	0
2016	5	0
2017	6	0
2018	1	0
Total	14	0

== Honours ==
Istiklol

- Tajik League: 2016, 2017
- Tajik Cup: 2016
- Tajik Supercup: 2016
