= Mahkamov =

Mahkamov is a surname. Notable people with the surname include:

- Abduazizov Mahkamov (born 1987), Tajikistani footballer
- Diyor Mahkamov (born 1987), Uzbek singer and actor
- Otabek Mahkamov (born 1984), Uzbekistani actor, lawyer, and internet personality
- Qahhor Mahkamov (1932–2016), Tajikistani politician and President of Tajikistan
