= Oybek Abdugafforov =

Tajikistani footballer

Personal information
- Date of birth: 30 March 1995 (age 31)
- Place of birth: Tajikistan
- Height: 1.82 m (6 ft 0 in)
- Position: Defender

Team information
- Current team: Eskhata Khujand
- Number: 14

Senior career*
Years	Team	Apps	(Gls)
- Energetik
- Regar-TadAZ
- Barki Tajik
2016–2017	Khosilot Farkhor		
2017	Istiklol	4	(1)
2018	Regar-TadAZ	11	(0)
2019–2020	Khujand	0	(0)
2021	Alay Osh	9	(0)
2021	Fayzkand	12	(1)
2022	Istaravshan	9	(0)
2022–	Eskhata Khujand	38	(3)

International career
2016–	Tajikistan	6	(0)
- * Club domestic league appearances and goals as of 4 November 2019

Oybek Abdugafforov (Russian: Ойбеk Abdugafforov born 30 March 1995) is a Tajik footballer who currently plays for Eskhata Khujand and the Tajikistan national football team.

== Career ==
=== Club ===
In August 2017, Abdugafforov signed for FC Istiklol.

On 22 February 2019, FK Khujand announced the signing of Abdugafforov. On 4 January 2021, Khujand confirmed that Abdugafforov had left the club at the end of his contract and had signed for Alay Osh.

=== International ===
Abdugafforov was chosen for the 2015 Commonwealth of Independent States Cup squad for the Tajikistan national under-21 football team.

Abdugafforov made his senior debut in a friendly testimonial match against Syria commemorating the 20th anniversary of the independence of Tajikistan, with his second appearing coming against Palestine.

== Career statistics ==
=== Club ===
As of match played 27 November 2017

Club	Season	League			National Cup		Continental		Other		Total	
Club	Season	Division	Apps	Goals	Apps	Goals	Apps	Goals	Apps	Goals	Apps	Goals
Istiklol	2017	Tajik League	4	0	3	1	0	0	0	0	7	1
Career total			4	0	3	1	0	0	0	0	7	1

=== International ===
Tajikistan football team
Year	Apps	Goals
2016	2	0
2017	1	0
2018	3	0
Total	6	0

Statistics accurate as of match played 12 October 2018
