= Oleksandr Stetsenko =

Ukrainian footballer (born 1990)

Oleksandr Stetsenko Олександр Стеценко
Personal information
- Full name: Oleksandr Viktorovych Stetsenko
- Date of birth: 2 March 1990 (age 36)
- Place of birth: Kyiv, Ukrainian SSR
- Height: 1.82 m (5 ft 11 1/2 in)
- Position: Defender

Team information
- Current team: Shturm Ivankiv

Youth career
- 2003–2007: Vidradnyi Kyiv

Senior career*
Years	Team	Apps	(Gls)
2007–2008	Dynamo Kyiv	0	(0)
2007	→ Dynamo-3 Kyiv	11	(0)
2007	→ Dynamo-2 Kyiv	2	(0)
2008–2009	Metalist Kharkiv	0	(0)
2010–2011	Arsenal Kyiv	0	(0)
2012	Sevastopol	9	(0)
2012–2014	Desna Chernihiv	38	(0)
2014	Mykolaiv	15	(1)
2015–2016	Poltava	30	(2)
2016	Avanhard Kramatorsk	17	(0)
2017	Sumy	13	(0)
2017	Istiklol	8	(0)
2018–2019	Kyzylzhar	9	(0)
2019	Bnei Sakhnin	5	(0)
2020–2022	Juniors Shpytky		
2022–	Shturm Ivankiv		

International career
2006	Ukraine-16	3	(0)
2006–2007	Ukraine-17	17	(0)
2007–2008	Ukraine-18	6	(0)
2008	Ukraine-19	2	(0)
- * Club domestic league appearances and goals as of 19:41, 21 November 2020 (UTC)

Oleksandr Stetsenko (Ukrainian: Олександр Вікторович Стеценко; born 2 March 1990) is a Ukrainian football defender who plays for amateur Ukrainian club Shturm Ivankiv.

== Career ==
Stetsenko is a product of FC Vidradnyi Kyiv Youth Sportive School system.

He spent his career as a player in the Ukrainian First League and the Ukrainian Second League. In August 2017 he signed a contract with Tajikistani football club Istiklol.

== Career statistics ==
=== Club ===
As of match played 6 February 2019

Club	Season	League			National Cup		League Cup		Continental		Other		Total	
Club	Season	Division	Apps	Goals	Apps	Goals	Apps	Goals	Apps	Goals	Apps	Goals	Apps	Goals
Dynamo Kyiv	2007–08	Vyshcha Liha	0	0	0	0	-		0	0	0	0	0	0
Metalist Kharkiv	2008–09	Vyshcha Liha	0	0	0	0	-		0	0	-		0	0
Metalist Kharkiv	2009–10	Vyshcha Liha	0	0	0	0	-		0	0	-		0	0
Metalist Kharkiv	Total		0	0	0	0	-	-	0	0	-	-	0	0
Arsenal Kyiv	2009–10	Vyshcha Liha	0	0	0	0	-		-		-		0	0
Arsenal Kyiv	2010–11	Vyshcha Liha	0	0	0	0	-		-		-		0	0
Arsenal Kyiv	2011–12	Vyshcha Liha	0	0	0	0	-		-		-		0	0
Arsenal Kyiv	Total		0	0	0	0	-	-	-	-	-	-	0	0
Sevastopol	2011–12	Persha Liha	9	0	0	0	-		-		-		9	0
Desna Chernihiv	2012–13	Druha Liha	23	0	2	0	-		-		-		25	0
Desna Chernihiv	2013–14	Persha Liha	15	0	2	0	-		-		-		17	0
Desna Chernihiv	Total		38	0	4	0	-	-	-	-	-	-	42	0
Mykolaiv	2014–15	Persha Liha	15	1	1	0	-		-		-		16	1
Poltava	2014–15	Persha Liha	8	0	0	0	-		-		-		8	0
Poltava	2015–16	Persha Liha	22	2	1	0	-		-		-		23	2
Poltava	Total		30	2	1	0	-	-	-	-	-	-	31	2
Avanhard Kramatorsk	2016–17	Persha Liha	17	0	0	0	-		-		-		17	0
Sumy	2016–17	Persha Liha	13	0	0	0	-		-		2	0	15	0
Istiklol	2017	Tajik League	8	0	4	0	-		5	0	0	0	17	0
Kyzylzhar	2018	Kazakhstan Premier League	9	0	0	0	-		-		-		9	0
Bnei Sakhnin	2018–19	Israeli Premier League	0	0	1	0	0	0	-		-		1	0
Career total			139	3	11	0	0	0	5	0	2	0	157	3

== Honours ==
=== Club ===
Istiklol

- Tajik League (1): 2017
