= Dmitry Barkov (footballer) =

Russian footballer

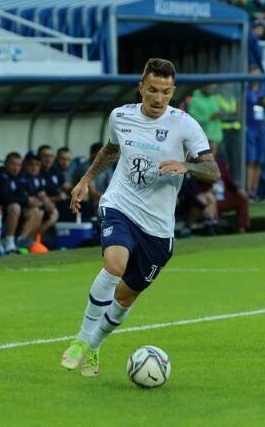
- Football player Dmitry Barkov

Personal information
- Full name: Dmitry Sergeyevich Barkov
- Date of birth: 19 June 1992 (age 34)
- Place of birth: Saint Petersburg, Russia
- Height: 1.83 m (6 ft 0 in)
- Position: Striker

Team information
- Current team: Zenit-2 St. Petersburg
- Number: 86

Senior career*
Years	Team	Apps	(Gls)
2011–2013	Karelia Petrozavodsk	55	(1)
2013–2014	Tosno	19	(0)
2014	Kaluga	18	(2)
2015–2016	Narva Trans	42	(19)
2017	Istiklol	17	(5)
2018	Narva Trans	29	(17)
2019–2020	Khimki	28	(5)
2020–2022	SKA-Khabarovsk	59	(13)
2022–2023	Baltika Kaliningrad	25	(2)
2023–2024	Arsenal Tula	23	(2)
2024–2025	Leningradets	24	(7)
2025–	Zenit-2 St. Petersburg	25	(4)
- * Club domestic league appearances and goals as of 17 October 2026

Dmitry Sergeyevich Barkov (Russian: Дмитрий Серге́евич Барков; born 19 June 1992) is a Russian professional footballer who plays as a striker who plays for Zenit-2 St. Petersburg.

== Career ==
=== Club ===
Barkov made his debut in the Russian Second Division for Karelia Petrozavodsk on 18 April 2011 in a game against Petrotrest St. Petersburg.

Barkov scored a hat-trick during Narva Trans' 14–0 first round Estonian Cup victory over SK Eestimaa Kasakad.

In January 2017, Barkov went on trial with Tajik Champions Istiklol, scoring twice in their friendly victory over CSKA Pamir Dushanbe. Barkov went on to sign a one-year contract with Istiklol in March 2017. A year later, in January 2018, Barkov went on trial with Lokomotiv Tashkent, before returning to Narva Trans on a one-year contract in February 2018.

He made his Russian Football National League debut for Khimki on 3 March 2019 in a game against Fakel Voronezh and scored on his debut.

On 6 July 2020, he signed with another FNL club SKA-Khabarovsk. He remained with Khimki until their 2019–20 Russian Cup campaign was concluded with the final game on 25 July.

Barkov made his Russian Premier League debut for Baltika Kaliningrad on 23 July 2023 in a game against Sochi.

== Career statistics ==
=== Club ===
As of match played 23 July 2023

Appearances and goals by club, season and competition
Club	Season	League			National Cup		League Cup		Continental		Other		Total	
Club	Season	Division	Apps	Goals	Apps	Goals	Apps	Goals	Apps	Goals	Apps	Goals	Apps	Goals
Karelia Petrozavodsk	2011–12	Russian Professional Football League	37	1	1	0	-		-		-		38	1
Karelia Petrozavodsk	2012–13	Russian Professional Football League	18	0	1	0	-		-		-		19	0
Karelia Petrozavodsk	Total		55	1	2	0	-	-	-	-	-	-	57	1
Tosno	2013–14	Russian Professional Football League	19	0	5	0	-		–		-		24	0
Kaluga	2014–15	Russian Professional Football League	18	2	1	0	-		–		-		19	2
Narva Trans	2015	Meistriliiga	24	8	3	4	-		-		-		27	12
Narva Trans	2016	Meistriliiga	18	11	1	0	-		-		-		19	11
Narva Trans	Total		42	19	4	4	-	-	-	-	-	-	46	23
Istiklol	2017	Tajik League	17	5	3	0	-		11	3	1	1	32	9
Narva Trans	2018	Meistriliiga	29	17	2	1	-		2	0	-		33	18
Khimki	2018–19	Russian National League	14	3	0	0	-		-		-		14	3
Khimki	2019–20	Russian National League	14	2	3	1	-		-		-		17	3
Khimki	Total		28	5	3	1	-	-	-	-	-	-	31	6
SKA-Khabarovsk	2020–21	Russian National League	35	11	4	1	-		-		-		39	12
SKA-Khabarovsk	2021–22	Russian First Division	24	2	0	0	-		-		0	0	24	2
SKA-Khabarovsk	Total		59	13	4	1	-	-	-	-	0	0	63	14
Baltika Kaliningrad	2022–23	Russian First League	24	2	1	0	-		–		-		25	2
Baltika Kaliningrad	2023–24	Russian Premier League	1	0	1	1	-		–		-		2	1
Baltika Kaliningrad	Total		25	2	2	1	-		-		-		27	3
Career total			296	64	26	8	-	-	13	3	1	1	308	74

== Honours ==
Istiklol

- Tajik League: 2017

Zenit-2 Saint Petersburg

- Russian Second League Division B: 2025
- Russian Second League Division A Silver Group: 2026
