= Tohir Malodustov =

Tajikistani footballer

Personal information
- Date of birth: 12 September 2000 (age 26)
- Place of birth: Tajikistan
- Height: 1.70 m (5 ft 7 in)
- Position: Forward

Team information
- Current team: Khujand

Senior career*
Years	Team	Apps	(Gls)
2017–2020	Barkchi		
2020	Kaganat	1	(0)
2020–2021	Khujand	15	(4)
2021–2022	Nurafshon		
2022–	Khujand		

International career^{‡}
2019–	Tajikistan	3	(0)
- * Club domestic league appearances and goals as of 11:13, 16 April 2021 (UTC) ‡ National team caps and goals as of 11:13, 16 April 2021 (UTC)

Tohir Malodustov (born 12 September 2000) is a Tajikistani professional football player who currently plays for Khujand.

== Career ==
=== International ===
Malodustov made his senior team debut on 10 July 2019 against North Korea.

== Career statistics ==
=== International ===
Tajikistan national team
Year	Apps	Goals
2019	2	0
2020	0	0
2021	1	0
Total	3	0

Statistics accurate as of match played 1 February 2021
