= Tabrez Islomov =

Tajikistani footballer

Personal information
- Full name: Tabrez Davlatmirzoyevich Islomov
- Date of birth: 6 June 1998 (age 28)
- Place of birth: Dushanbe, Tajikistan
- Height: 1.79 m (5 ft 10 in)
- Position: Defender

Team information
- Current team: Istiklol
- Number: 3

Senior career*
Years	Team	Apps	(Gls)
2016–2021	Istiklol	63	(1)
2016	→ Barki Tajik (loan)		
2021	Narva Trans	26	(0)
2022–	Istiklol	66	(1)

International career^{‡}
2016–2019	Tajikistan U19	4	(0)
2016–	Tajikistan	37	(0)
- * Club domestic league appearances and goals as of 08:33, 23 April 2026 (UTC) ‡ National team caps and goals as of 18 November 2025

Tabrez Davlatmirzoyevich Islomov (Tajik: Табрез Давлатмирзоевич Исломов, Russian: Табрез Давлатмирзоевич Исломов; born 6 June 1998) is a Tajikistani professional football player who plays for Istiklol and the Tajikistan national team.

== Career ==
=== Club ===
In June 2016, Islomov return to FC Istiklol after a loan spell with Barki Tajik.

On 9 February 2021, Istiklol confirmed that Islomov had left the club to sign a one-year contract with Estonian Meistriliiga club Narva Trans. In November 2021, with three rounds of the 2021 Season still remaining, Islomov left Narva Trans after his work visa had expired.

On 2 March 2022, Istiklol confirmed that Islomov would be out for two-months with a knee injury. On 31 March 2022, Istiklol confirmed the signing of Islomov.

=== International ===
Islomov made his senior team debut on 7 July 2016 against Bangladesh.

== Career statistics ==
=== Club ===
As of match played 19 April 2026

Club	Season	League			National Cup		Continental		Other		Total	
Club	Season	Division	Apps	Goals	Apps	Goals	Apps	Goals	Apps	Goals	Apps	Goals
Istiklol	2016	Tajikistan Higher League	3	0	2	0	0 (Note: Appearances in the AFC Cup)	0	0 (Note: Appearances in the Tajik Supercup)	0	5	0
Istiklol	2017	Tajikistan Higher League	12	0	4	0	1	0	0	0	17	0
Istiklol	2018	Tajikistan Higher League	12	0	4	0	2	0	1	0	19	0
Istiklol	2019	Tajikistan Higher League	18	0	7	0	0 (Note: Zero appearances in the AFC Champions League, and zero appearances in the AFC Cup)	0	0	0	25	0
Istiklol	2020	Tajikistan Higher League	18	1	2	0	3 (Note: Two appearances in the AFC Champions League, and one appearance in the AFC Cup)	0	1	0	24	1
Istiklol	Total		63	1	19	0	6	0	2	0	90	1
Narva Trans	2021	Meistriliiga	26	0	3	0	-		-		29	0
Istiklol	2022	Tajikistan Higher League	9	1	3	0	0 (Note: Appearances in the AFC Champions League)	0	0	0	12	1
Istiklol	2023	Tajikistan Higher League	13	0	4	1	6	0	1	0	24	1
Istiklol	2024	Tajikistan Higher League	18	0	5	0	3 (Note: Appearances in the AFC Champions League Two)	0	1	0	27	0
Istiklol	2025	Tajikistan Higher League	21	0	2	0	4	0	1	0	28	0
Istiklol	2026	Tajikistan Higher League	5	0	0	0	0 (Note: Appearances in the AFC Challenge League)	0	0	0	5	0
Istiklol	Total		66	1	14	1	13	0	3	0	96	2
Career total			155	2	36	1	19	0	5	0	215	3

=== International ===
Tajikistan national team
Year	Apps	Goals
2016	1	0
2017	0	0
2018	4	0
2019	7	0
2020	2	0
2021	6	0
2022	2	0
2023	6	0
2024	3	0
Total	31	0

Statistics accurate as of match played 28 January 2024

== Honors ==
Istiklol

- Tajikistan Higher League: 2016, 2017, 2018, 2019, 2020, 2022, 2023
- Tajik Cup: 2016, 2018, 2019, 2023
- Tajik Supercup: 2018, 2020, 2024

Tajikistan

- King's Cup: 2022
