= Abduaziz Mahkamov =

Tajikistani footballer

Personal information
- Full name: Abduaziz Mahkamov (Tajik: Абдуазиз Махкамов)
- Date of birth: 15 July 1987 (age 39)
- Place of birth: Tajikistan
- Position: Goalkeeper

Senior career*
Years	Team	Apps	(Gls)
2001	Panjshir		
2002–2016	Khujand		
2016–2019	Alay Osh		

International career^{‡}
2016–2019	Tajikistan	12	(0)
- * Club domestic league appearances and goals as of 2 August 2019 ‡ National team caps and goals as of 2 August 2019

Abduaziz Mahkamov (born 15 July 1987), is a former Tajikistani footballer who played as a goalkeeper. Mahkamov was banned for life from playing football in August 2019.

== Career ==
=== Club ===
During March 2016, Mahkamov moved from FK Khujand to Kyrgyzstan League Champions Alay Osh. On 2 August 2019, the Asian Football Confederation announced that Mahkamov had been banned for life for his involvement in a conspiracy to manipulate matches during Alay Osh's 2017 AFC Cup and 2018 AFC Cup campaign.

=== International ===
Mahkamov made his debut for Tajikistan national team on 7 June 2016, in a 1–0 victory over Bangladesh.

== Career statistics ==
=== International ===
Tajikistan national team
Year	Apps	Goals
2016	5	0
2017	6	0
2018	1	0
Total	12	0

Statistics accurate as of match played 27 March 2018
