= Fatkhullo Fatkhulloyev =

Tajikistani footballer

Personal information
- Full name: Fatkhullo Dastamovich Fatkhulloyev
- Date of birth: 24 March 1990 (age 36)
- Place of birth: Dushanbe, Tajik SSR, Soviet Union
- Height: 1.84 m (6 ft 0 in)
- Position: Winger

Team information
- Current team: Vakhsh Bokhtar
- Number: 18

Senior career*
Years	Team	Apps	(Gls)
2007–2008	Dynamo Dushanbe		
2008–2017	Istiklol		
2018	Persela Lamongan	0	(0)
2018–2019	Istiklol	25	(7)
2019	Buxoro	11	(1)
2020	Khujand	18	(5)
2020–2021	Chennaiyin	16	(1)
2021	CSKA Pamir Dushanbe	26	(9)
2022	Abdysh-Ata Kant	0	(0)
2022	Regar-TadAZ	19	(7)
2022–2023	Rahmatganj MFS	13	(0)
2023–2024	Eskhata	30	(3)
2025–	Vakhsh Bokhtar	22	(2)

International career^{‡}
2006–2007	Tajikistan U17		
2014	Tajikistan U23	4	(1)
2007–2019	Tajikistan	71	(10)
- * Club domestic league appearances and goals as of 16 March 2026 ‡ National team caps and goals as of 14 April 2023

Fatkhullo Dastamovich Fatkhulloyev (Russian: Фатхулло Дастамович Фатхуллоев; born 24 March 1990) is a Tajik professional footballer who plays as a winger for Tajikistan Higher League club Vakhsh Bokhtar and the Tajikistan national team.

== Club career ==
Fatkhulloyev began his senior club career in Tajik club Dynamo Dushanbe, where he spent one season.

On 30 December 2017, Fatkhulloyev signed a one-year contract with Indonesian Liga 1 side Persela Lamongan, but was released by the club on 5 February 2018.

On 19 July 2019, Fatkhulloyev left FC Istiklol to join Uzbekistan Super League club FK Buxoro.

On 12 February 2020, Fatkhulloyev signed for FK Khujand.

=== Indian Super League ===
On 15 October 2020, Fatkhulloyev signed for Indian Super League club Chennaiyin FC on a one-year deal. He joined the club as their Asian quota player and made his league debut against Jamshedpur FC on 24 November. He scored his first goal against Kerala Blasters FC on 21 February 2021.

After leaving Chennaiyin, Fatkhulloyev signed for CSKA Pamir Dushanbe on 20 March 2021.

In January 2022, FC Abdysh-Ata Kant confirmed that the club signed a contract with Fatkhulloyev

=== Rahmatganj MFS ===
In November 2022, Fatkhulloyev signed for Rahmatganj MFS ahead of the 2022–23 season.

=== Eskhata ===
On 27 July 2023, Fatkhulloyev signed for Eskhata until the end of the season.

== International career ==
Fatkhulloyev represented Tajikistan in the 2007 FIFA U-17 World Cup, which was held in South Korea.

In 2007, he was called up in the national squad and he made his debut against Kazakhstan on 8 September, which ended 1–1. From 2007 to 2019, he played 68 international matches for Tajikistan scoring 9 goals.

== Career statistics ==
=== Club ===
As of match played 1 May 2021

Appearances and goals by club, season and competition
Club	Season	League			National cup		Continental		Other		Total	
Club	Season	Division	Apps	Goals	Apps	Goals	Apps	Goals	Apps	Goals	Apps	Goals
Istiklol	2010	Tajikistan Higher League					–		1	0	1	0
Istiklol	2011	Tajikistan Higher League					5	3	1	0	6	3
Istiklol	2012	Tajikistan Higher League					5	1	1	0	6	1
Istiklol	2013	Tajikistan Higher League	16	2			–		–		16	2
Istiklol	2014	Tajikistan Higher League	13	6	5	2	–		1	0	19	8
Istiklol	2015	Tajikistan Higher League	14	9	5	5	11	1	1	1	31	16
Istiklol	2016	Tajikistan Higher League	16	10	7	2	6	1	1	0	30	13
Istiklol	2017	Tajikistan Higher League	19	7	4	1	11	0	1	0	35	8
Istiklol	Total		78	35	21	10	38	6	7	1	144	51
Persela Lamongan	2018	Liga 1	0	0	0	0	–		0	0	0	0
Istiklol	2018	Tajikistan Higher League	19	4	5	2	6	3	1	0	31	9
Istiklol	2019	Tajikistan Higher League	6	3	0	0	7	1	1	0	14	4
Istiklol	Total		25	7	5	2	13	4	2	0	45	13
Buxoro	2019	Uzbekistan Super League	11	1	0	0	–		–		11	1
Khujand	2020	Tajikistan Higher League	18	5	0	0	1	0	–		19	5
Chennaiyin	2020–21	Indian Super League	16	1	–		–		–		16	1
CSKA Pamir Dushanbe	2021	Tajikistan Higher League	5	1	0	0	–		–		5	1
Career total			153	50	26	12	52	10	9	1	240	70

=== International ===
Appearances and goals by national team and year
National team	Year	Apps	Goals
Tajikistan	2007	2	0
Tajikistan	2008	7	1
Tajikistan	2009	1	0
Tajikistan	2010	6	2
Tajikistan	2011	10	0
Tajikistan	2012	6	0
Tajikistan	2013	4	1
Tajikistan	2014	5	2
Tajikistan	2015	7	2
Tajikistan	2016	7	0
Tajikistan	2017	6	0
Tajikistan	2018	5	1
Tajikistan	2019	2	0
Total		68	9

Statistics accurate as of match played 14 November 2018

Scores and results list Tajikistan's goal tally first.

#	Date	Venue	Opponent	Score	Result	Competition
1.	13 August 2008	Ambedkar Stadium, New Delhi, India	India	1–3	1–4	2008 AFC Challenge Cup
2.	18 February 2010	Sugathadasa Stadium, Colombo, Sri Lanka	Sri Lanka	2–0	3–1	2010 AFC Challenge Cup
3.	18 February 2010	Sugathadasa Stadium, Colombo, Sri Lanka	Sri Lanka	3–1	3–1	2010 AFC Challenge Cup
4.	14 August 2013	20 Years of Independence Stadium, Khujand, Tajikistan	India	2–0	3–0	Friendly
5.	8 August 2014	Pamir Stadium, Dushanbe, Tajikistan	Malaysia	3–1	4–1	Friendly
6.	4 September 2014	Borisov Arena, Barysaw, Belarus	Belarus	1–1	1–6	Friendly
7.	26 March 2015	Male' Sports Complex, Malé, Maldives	Maldives	1–0	2–0	Friendly
8.	16 June 2015	Bangabandhu National Stadium, Dhaka, Bangladesh	Bangladesh	1–1	1–1	2018 FIFA World Cup qualification
9.	2 October 2018	Sylhet District Stadium, Sylhet, Bangladesh	Nepal	1–0	2–0	2018 Bangabandhu Cup

== Honours ==
Istiklol

- Tajik League: 2010, 2011, 2014, 2015, 2016, 2017, 2018
- Tajik Cup: 2009, 2010, 2013, 2014, 2016, 2018
- Tajik Supercup: 2014, 2015, 2016, 2018, 2019
- AFC President's Cup: 2012

Tajikistan

- AFC Challenge Cup runner-up: 2008
