= Artem Baranovskyi =

Ukrainian footballer

Personal information
- Full name: Artem Mykolayovych Baranovskyi
- Date of birth: 17 March 1990 (age 36)
- Place of birth: Krasnohorivka, Donetsk Oblast, Ukrainian SSR
- Height: 1.88 m (6 ft 2 in)
- Position: Defender

Team information
- Current team: Michigan Stars

Youth career
- 2002: FC Metalurh Donetsk
- 2003–2007: UOR Donetsk

Senior career*
Years	Team	Apps	(Gls)
2007–2008	Tytan Donetsk	48	(1)
2009–2015	Metalurh Donetsk	40	(1)
2015–2016	Stal Dniprodzerzhynsk	12	(0)
2016	Olimpik Donetsk	10	(0)
2017–2018	Istiklol	30	(1)
2019	Shakhter Karagandy	33	(1)
2020	Buxoro	1	(0)
2020	Kyzylzhar	10	(0)
2021	Akzhayik	18	(0)
2022	Caspiy	23	(1)
2023–	Michigan Stars	21	(1)
- * Club domestic league appearances and goals as of 19 December 2023

Artem Baranovskyi (Ukrainian: Артем Миколайович Барановський; born 17 March 1990) is a Ukrainian professional footballer who plays as a defender for FC Akzhayik.

== Career ==
Baranovskyi is a product of the youth team systems of FC Metalurh Donetsk and UOR Donetsk. He made his senior professional debut for FC Metalurh entering as a second-half substitute against SC Tavriya Simferopol on 24 April 2011, in the Ukrainian Premier League.

He played for FC Stal Dniprodzerzhynsk in the Ukrainian Premier League.

In March 2017, having been on trial with the club, Baranovskyi signed a one-year contract with FC Istiklol. Istiklol announced on 27 January 2019, Baranovskyi's contract had not been renewed after it ended at the end of the 2018 season.

On 13 February 2019, Baranovskyi signed a one-year contract with Shakhter Karagandy.

On 9 September 2020, Baranovskyi signed for FC Kyzylzhar.

On 4 March 2021, Baranovskyi signed for FC Akzhayik.

== Career statistics ==
=== Club ===
As of match played 29 October 2022

Club	Season	League			National Cup		Continental		Other		Total	
Club	Season	Division	Apps	Goals	Apps	Goals	Apps	Goals	Apps	Goals	Apps	Goals
Tytan Donetsk	2007–08	Ukrainian Second League	31	1	0	0	-		-		31	1
Tytan Donetsk	2008–09	Ukrainian Second League	17	0	1	0	-		-		18	0
Tytan Donetsk	Total		48	1	1	0	-	-	-	-	49	1
Metalurh Donetsk	2009–10	Ukrainian Premier League	0	0	0	0	-		-		0	0
Metalurh Donetsk	2010–11	Ukrainian Premier League	0	0	0	0	-		-		0	0
Metalurh Donetsk	2011–12	Ukrainian Premier League	2	0	0	0	-		-		2	0
Metalurh Donetsk	2012–13	Ukrainian Premier League	16	1	1	0	0	0	0	0	17	1
Metalurh Donetsk	2013–14	Ukrainian Premier League	8	0	1	0	-		-		9	0
Metalurh Donetsk	2014–15	Ukrainian Premier League	14	0	1	0	-		-		15	0
Metalurh Donetsk	Total		40	1	3	0	-	-	0	0	43	1
Stal Dniprodzerzhynsk	2015–16	Ukrainian Premier League	12	0	3	0	-		-		15	0
Olimpik Donetsk	2016–17	Ukrainian Premier League	10	0	0	0	-		-		10	0
Istiklol	2017	Tajik League	16	1	2	0	9	0	1	0	28	1
Istiklol	2018	Tajik League	14	0	4	1	6	0	1	0	25	1
Istiklol	Total		30	1	6	1	15	0	2	0	53	2
Shakhter Karagandy	2019	Kazakhstan Premier League	33	1	1	0	-		-		34	1
Buxoro	2020	Uzbekistan Super League	1	0	0	0	-		-		1	0
Kyzylzhar	2020	Kazakhstan Premier League	10	0	0	0	–		–		10	0
Akzhayik	2021	Kazakhstan Premier League	18	0	5	0	–		–		23	0
Caspiy	2022	Kazakhstan Premier League	23	1	4	1	–		–		27	2
Michigan Stars	2023	NISA	21	1	1	0	–		2	0	24	1
Career total			246	6	24	2	15	0	4	0	289	8

== Honours ==
Istiklol

- Tajik League: 2017, 2018
- Tajik Supercup: 2018
