= Davronjon Tukhtasunov =

Tajikistani footballer (born 1990)

Davrondzhon Tukhtasunov
Personal information
- Full name: Davrondzhon Tukhtasunov
- Date of birth: 14 May 1990 (age 36)
- Position: Striker

Team information
- Current team: Khujand

Senior career*
Years	Team	Apps	(Gls)
2006–2007	Dynamo Dushanbe		
2008–2010	Regar-TadAZ Tursunzoda		
2011–2012	CSKA Pamir Dushanbe		
2013	Ravshan Kulob		
2014–2015	Daleron-Uroteppa		
2015–2016	CSKA Pamir Dushanbe		
2017–	Khujand		

International career^{‡}
2006–2007	Tajikistan U17		
2007–	Tajikistan	18	(1)
- * Club domestic league appearances and goals as of 7 December 2017 ‡ National team caps and goals as of 23 March 2017

Davronjon Tukhtasunov (born 14 May 1990) is a Tajikistani footballer who plays for FK Khujand. He is a member of the Tajikistan national football team in the 2010 FIFA World Cup qualification campaign. He also joined the 2007 FIFA U-17 World Cup held in South Korea.

== Career statistics ==
=== Tajik League ===
Year	Apps	Goals
Dynamo Dushanbe 2006-2007	40	20
Regar-TadAZ 2008-2010	50	30
CSKA Pamir Dushanbe 2011	20	7
Regar-TadAZ 2012	24	9
Ravshan 2013	15	5
Daleron 2014	18	5
CSKA Pamir Dushanbe 2015-2016	36	20
Khujand 2017	20	9

Tajikistan national team
Year	Apps	Goals
2007	1	0
2008	4	0
2009	1	0
2010	6	1
2011	5	0
2012	0	0
2013	0	0
2014	0	0
2015	0	0
2016	0	0
2017	1	0
Total	18	1

Statistics accurate as of match played 23 March 2017

=== International goals ===
#	Date	Venue	Opponent	Score	Result	Competition
1.	2 January 2010	Sana'a, Yemen	Yemen	1–0	1–0	Friendly

== Honours ==
Regar-TadAZ

- Tajik League (1): 2008

Ravshan Kulob

- Tajik League (1): 2013
