= Bakhtiyor Choriyev =

Tajikistani footballer

Personal information
- Full name: Bakhtiyor Choriyev
- Date of birth: 19 April 1992 (age 34)
- Height: 1.76 m (5 ft 9 in)
- Position: Midfielder

Team information
- Current team: CSKA Pamir

Senior career*
Years	Team	Apps	(Gls)
2011–2014	Energetik Dushanbe		
2015	Khujand		
2016–2017	Regar-TadAZ		
2018–2021	Khujand		
2021	Istaravshan		
2022	Regar-TadAZ		
2022–	CSKA Pamir		

International career^{‡}
2013–	Tajikistan	4	(0)
- * Club domestic league appearances and goals as of 1 April 2023 ‡ National team caps and goals as of 1 April 2023

Bakhtiyor Choriyev (born 19 April 1992) is a Tajikistani player, who currently plays for CSKA Pamir.

== Career ==
=== Club ===
On 14 January 2019, Choriyev signed a new contract with FK Khujand.

On 30 July 2021, Khujand announced that Choriyev had left the club to sign for FK Istaravshan.

=== International ===
He has been a member of the Tajikistan national football team since 2013.

== Career statistics ==
=== International ===
Tajikistan national team
Year	Apps	Goals
2013	1	0
2014	1	0
2015	0	0
2016	2	0
Total	4	0

Statistics accurate as of match played 13 November 2016
