= Farkhor =

Farkhor Фархор
- Location in Tajikistan
- Coordinates: 37°30′N 69°24′E
- Country: Tajikistan
- Region: Khatlon Region
- District: Farkhor

Population (January 2020)
  - Total: 25,300
- Official languages: Russian (Interethnic); Tajik (State)

Farkhor (Tajik: Фархор), also called Parkhar (Russian: Пархар), is a city in southwestern Tajikistan, located on the border with Afghanistan. It is the capital of Farkhor District in Khatlon Region. The population of the town is 25,300 (January 2020 estimate). The Farkhor Air Base is about 4 km south-west of Farkhor. The record high temperature of 44.4 °C (111.9 °F) was recorded on July 8, 2021. The previously mentioned temperature was surpassed by a new record temperature of 45.1 °C (113.2 °F) was recorded on July, 2025.
