= Jahongir Ergashev =

Tajikistani footballer

Jahongir Ergashev Джахонгир Эргашев
Personal information
- Full name: Jahongir Narzulloevich Ergashev
- Date of birth: 6 March 1994 (age 32)
- Place of birth: Dushanbe, Tajikistan
- Height: 1.74 m (5 ft 9 in)
- Position: Midfielder

Team information
- Current team: Eskhata Khujand
- Number: 63

Youth career
- 2011: Khujand
- 2012: CSKA Pomir
- 2012: Istiklol

Senior career*
Years	Team	Apps	(Gls)
2012–2015	Istiklol	28	(10)
2015–2016	→ Khujand (loan)		
2016	Dinamo Brest	12	(1)
2017	Istiklol	4	(1)
2017–2019	Khujand		
2019–2020	Saif	4	(0)
2020	Khujand	8	(2)
2021	Qizilqum Zarafshon	3	(0)
2021	Eskhata	12	(6)
2022	Neftchi Kochkor-Ata		
2022–2023	Khujand	43	(14)
2024	Eskhata Khujand	18	(10)
2025	Regar-TadAZ Tursunzoda	9	(0)
2025–	Eskhata Khujand	9	(1)

International career^{‡}
2013–2014	Tajikistan U21	11	(1)
2014	Tajikistan U23	4	(1)
2013–	Tajikistan	35	(4)
- * Club domestic league appearances and goals as of 16 March 2026 ‡ National team caps and goals as of 16 November 2021

Jahongir Ergashev (Tajik: ‌Джахонгир Эргашев, born 6 March 1994) is a Tajik professional footballer who plays as a midfielder for Eskhata Khujand and the Tajikistan national team.

== Career ==
=== Club ===
In March 2015, Ergashev moved to FK Khujand on a season-long loan deal.

Ergashev was listed in FK Khujand's 2016 AFC Cup squad list, but did not feature in their match against Ahli Al-Khaleel. After a trial with Belshina Bobruisk, Ergashev went on trial with Dinamo Brest, going on to sign a six-month contract with Dinamo Brest on 1 April 2016. Ergashev scored his first goal for Dinamo Brest on 30 April 2016, against Isloch.

Ergashev left Dinamo Brest near the end of January 2017, going on to sign a contract for the 2017 season with FC Istiklol on 14 February 2017. Ergashev was released from his Istiklol contract on 5 July 2017, signing for FK Khujand until the end of the 2017 season on the same day.

On 23 January 2019, Ergashev signed a new contract with FK Khujand.

On 3 November 2019, Ergashev was announced as a new signing for Saif SC prior to the start of the 2019–20 season. On 18 July 2020, FK Khujand announced the return of Ergashev.

In March 2021, Ergashev joined Uzbekistan Super League club Qizilqum Zarafshon.

In January 2022, Kyrgyz Premier League club Neftchi Kochkor-Ata announced that Ergashev had signed a contract to join the club.

On 9 March 2022, Ergashev re-signed for Khujand.

=== International ===
Ergashev was part of the Tajikistan U-21's at the 2013 Commonwealth of Independent States Cup, He also scored his first senior goal against Macau in the qualifying tournament for the 2014 AFC Challenge Cup.

== Career statistics ==
=== Club ===
As of match played 3 May 2017

Club	Season	League			National Cup		Continental		Other		Total	
Club	Season	Division	Apps	Goals	Apps	Goals	Apps	Goals	Apps	Goals	Apps	Goals
Istiklol	2013	Tajikistan Higher League	14	5			–		–		14	5
Istiklol	2014	Tajikistan Higher League	14	5	4	4	–		1	1	19	10
Istiklol	2015	Tajikistan Higher League	0	0	0	0	1	0	0	0	1	0
Istiklol	Total		28	10	4	4	1	0	1	1	34	15
Dinamo Brest	2016	Belarusian Premier League	12	1	0	0	–		–		12	1
Istiklol	2017	Tajikistan Higher League	4	1	0	0	2	0	1	0	7	1
Career total			44	12	4	4	3	0	2	1	53	17

=== International ===
Tajikistan national team
Year	Apps	Goals
2013	3	1
2014	4	0
2015	0	0
2016	6	2
2017	3	0
2018	7	0
2019	8	1
2020	1	0
2021	2	0
Total	34	4

Statistics accurate as of match played 5 February 2021

=== International goals ===
Scores and results list Tajikistan's goal tally first.

No.	Date	Venue	Opponent	Score	Result	Competition
1.	19 March 2013	Spartak Stadium, Bishkek	Macau	3–0	3–0	2014 AFC Challenge Cup qualification
2.	2 June 2016	Pamir Stadium, Dushanbe	Bangladesh	1–0	5–0	2019 AFC Asian Cup qualification
3.	2 June 2016	Pamir Stadium, Dushanbe	Bangladesh	2–0	5–0	2019 AFC Asian Cup qualification
4.	19 November 2019	Dolen Omurzakov Stadium, Bishkek	Kyrgyzstan	1–0	1–1	2022 FIFA World Cup qualification
