= Firdavs Chakalov =

Tajikistani footballer

Personal information
- Full name: Firdavs Abduzhalilovich Chakalov
- Date of birth: 24 February 1996 (age 30)
- Place of birth: Dushanbe, Tajikistan
- Height: 1.78 m (5 ft 10 in)
- Position: Defender

Team information
- Current team: Eskhata Khujand
- Number: 21

Senior career*
Years	Team	Apps	(Gls)
2012–2017	CSKA Pamir Dushanbe		
2018	Khujand	11	(0)
2018	Victory		
2019–2021	Khujand	48	(7)
2021	Turon Yaypan	1	(0)
2022–2023	Khujand	27	(1)
2024–	Eskhata Khujand	21	(1)
2025	Khosilot Farkhor	19	(0)
2026–	Eskhata Khujand	2	(1)

International career^{‡}
2017–	Tajikistan	2	(0)
- * Club domestic league appearances and goals as of 16 March 2026 ‡ National team caps and goals as of 14:15, 29 March 2022 (UTC)

Firdavs Abduzhalilovich Chakalov (Russian: Фирдавс Абдужалилович Чакалов; born 24 February 1996) is a Tajikistani international footballer who plays as a defender for Tajikistan Higher League side Eskhata Khujand.

== Career ==
In June 2018, Chakalov moved to Victory from FK Khujand.

On 14 January 2019, Chakalov returned to FK Khujand.

=== International ===
Chakalov made his international debut in a 2–1 2019 AFC Asian Cup qualification victory against Nepal, replacing Davron Ergashev in the 74th minute.

== Career statistics ==
=== International ===
Tajikistan national team
Year	Apps	Goals
2017	1	0
2018	0	0
2019	0	0
2020	0	0
2021	0	0
2022	1	0
Total	2	0

Statistics accurate as of match played 29 March 2022
