= Manouchehr Ahmadov =

Tajikistani footballer

Personal information
- Full name: Manouchehr Murotovich Ahmadov (Tajik: Манучеҳр Муротович Ахмедов)
- Date of birth: 28 October 1992 (age 33)
- Place of birth: Nefteabad, Tajikistan
- Height: 1.78 m (5 ft 10 in)
- Position: Defender

Team information
- Current team: Ravshan Zafarobod
- Number: 22

Senior career*
Years	Team	Apps	(Gls)
2011–2012	Parvoz		
2012–2015	Khujand		
2015	Al-Ahli		
2016–2017	Khujand		
2018	New Radiant		
2018–2021	Khujand		
2021	Istaravshan	11	(1)
2022–	Ravshan Zafarobod		

International career^{‡}
2015–	Tajikistan	5	(0)
- * Club domestic league appearances and goals as of 21 June 2022 ‡ National team caps and goals as of 25 October 2018

Manouchehr Murotovich Ahmadov (Tajik: Манучеҳр Аҳмадов; born 28 October 1992) is a Tajik professional footballer who plays as a defender for Ravshan Zafarobod, and the Tajikistan national football team.

== Career ==
=== Club ===
On 29 December 2015, Ahmadov terminated his contract with Bahraini side Al-Ahli. On 3 January 2016, Ahmadov was registered by FK Khujand for their 2016 AFC Cup campaign. On 15 January 2019, Ahmadov signed a new contract with FK Khujand. On 18 April 2021, Ahmadov left Khujand by mutual consent.

=== International ===
Ahmadov made his debut for Tajikistan on 13 October 2015 against Jordan.

== Career statistics ==
=== International ===
Tajikistan national team
Year	Apps	Goals
2015	1	0
2016	2	0
2017	0	0
2018	2	0
Total	5	0

Statistics accurate as of match played 25 October 2018
