= Farkhod Tokhirov =

Tajikistani footballer (born 1990)

Personal information
- Full name: Farkhod Tokhirov (Tajik: Фарҳод Тоҳиров)
- Date of birth: 29 May 1990 (age 36)
- Place of birth: Dushanbe, Tajik SSR, Soviet Union
- Height: 1.76 m (5 ft 9 in)
- Position: Striker

Team information
- Current team: Negeri Sembilan

Senior career*
Years	Team	Apps	(Gls)
2010–2012	Istiklol		
2012	Andijan	9	(1)
2012	Istiklol		
2013	Istaravshan		
2013–2014	Parvoz		
2015–2018	Khujand	67	(29)

International career^{‡}
- Tajikistan U17
2011–	Tajikistan	26	(1)
- * Club domestic league appearances and goals as of 30 January 2019 ‡ National team caps and goals as of 30 January 2019

Farkhod Tokhirov (Tajik: Фарҳод Тоҳиров; born 29 May 1990) is a Tajikistani footballer who currently plays for Perak FA. He is a member of the Tajikistan national football team.

== Career ==
=== Club ===
Tokhirov scored a hat-trick in his last game for Khujand, finishing with 36 goals in 91 games in all competitions.

=== International ===
Tokhirov played for Tajikistan in 2007 FIFA U-17 World Cup and 2012 AFC Challenge Cup.

== Career statistics ==
=== International ===
Tajikistan national team
Year	Apps	Goals
2011	6	0
2012	5	0
2013	3	0
2014	5	1
2015	5	0
2016	2	0
Total	26	1

Statistics accurate as of match played 6 September 2016

=== International goals ===
As of 10 September 2014

#	Date	Venue	Opponent	Score	Result	Competition
1.	12 August 2014	Astana Arena, Astana, Kazakhstan	Kazakhstan	1–1	2–1	Friendly match

== Honors ==
=== Club ===
Istiklol

- Tajik League (2): 2010, 2011
- Tajik Cup (2): 2010
- AFC President's Cup (1): 2012
