= FK Khujand =

Khujand
- Full name: Football Club Khujand; Клуби Футболи Хуҷанд
- Nickname: The Blue Eagle
- Founded: 1976; 50 years ago
- Ground: Bistsolagii Istiqloliyati Stadium; Khujand, Tajikistan
- Capacity: 25,000
- Chairman: Murodjon Umarov
- Manager: Milan Milanović
- League: Ligai Olii Tojikiston
- 2025: Tajikistan Higher League, 5th of 10
- Website: khujand-fc.tj
Home colours	Away colours

FK Khujand (Tajik: Клуби футболи Хуҷанд) is a Tajik professional football club based in Khujand, currently playing in the Ligai Olii Tojikiston, the top division in the country.

== History ==
FС Khujand was established in 1976 from the remnants of the club Pomir which was previously known as Miner. The first head coach of the team was Vladimir Burin. FC Khujand competed in the Central Asian Championship B League for 15 years. FС Khujand plays its home matches in Spartak Stadium which was located in the heart of the city before moving to the 20 Years of Independence Stadium (also known as 20-Letie Nezavisimosti Stadium). The best performances of FC Khujand in this competition were 8th place in 1983 and 1986, runners-up in 1990 and a third-place finish in 1991. Since the independence of Tajikistan from USSR, FC Khujand has won the Tajik Cup on four occasions; 1998, 2002, 2008 and 2017.

On 12 April 2019, Numonjon Yusupov was sacked as the club's manager, with Sharif Ziyoyev being appointed as caretaker manager.

On 16 April 2019, Vitaliy Levchenko was appointed as the new manager of Khujand.

On 21 December 2019, Nikola Lazarevic was announced as the new head coach of FK Khujand.

On 12 July 2020, Khujand announced Khakim Fuzailov as their new manager, after Nikola Lazarevic was unable to return to Tajikistan due to travel restrictions imposed by the COVID-19 pandemic, with Rustam Khojayev previously being in temporary charge since the Ligai Olii Tojikiston returned on 16 June 2020.

On 10 September 2020, the 2020 AFC Cup was cancelled.

On 18 October 2026, Milan Milanović guided FK Khujand to their first trophy since the 2021 Tajikistan Cup, as the FK Khujand defeated FK Sardor 2–1 in the 2026 Tajikistan Cup final.

=== Domestic history ===
Season	League									Tajik Cup	Top goalscorer		Manager
Season	Div.	Pos.	Pl.	W	D	L	GS	GA	P	Tajik Cup	Name	League	Manager
1997	1st	3	24	16	4	4	51	20	52	Runners-up			
1998	1st	2	22	13	5	4	44	19	44	Winners			
1999	1st	6	22	13	1	8	60	28	40				
2000	1st	3	34	21	5	8	94	37	68		Mansurjon Hakimov	28	
2001	1st	5	18	7	6	5	36	22	27				
2002	1st	2	22	17	2	3	76	17	53	Winner	Dzhomikhon Mukhidinov	29	
2003	1st	2	30	23	3	4	90	26	72				
2004	1st	4	36	17	9	10	56	36	60				
2005	1st	5	18	8	3	7	28	19	27				
2006	1st	7	22	9	3	10	27	33	30				
2007	1st	6	20	8	3	9	27	37	27				
2008	1st	3	40	28	4	8	73	33	88	Winner			
2009	1st	3	18	13	1	4	36	15	40	Quarter-final	Pyrmurod Burkhonov	9	
2010	1st	7	32	8	8	16	42	58	32	Runner-up			
2011	1st	7	40	15	6	19	56	72	51				
2012	1st	8	24	8	6	10	29	44	30	Round of 16	Indus Huseynzoda	7	
2013	1st	5	18	6	5	7	17	21	23	Round of 16	Valeriu Andronic / Yusuf Rabiev / Mohammad Golepor	3	Mubin Ergashev
2014	1st	3	18	9	5	4	24	17	32	Round of 16	Manouchehr Ahmadov	7	Numonjon Yusupov
2015	1st	2	18	12	3	3	34	21	39	Quarter-final	Farkhod Tokhirov	6	Numonjon Yusupov
2016	1st	7	18	8	1	9	22	37	25	Semi-final	Dilshod Bozorov	8	Numonjon Yusupov / Hamid Karimov
2017	1st	2	21	11	4	6	44	22	37	Winner	Dilshod Bozorov; Davronjon Tukhtasunov	9	Rustam Khojaev
2018	1st	2	21	14	4	3	42	20	46	Semi-final	Jahongir Ergashev	13	Numonjon Yusupov
2019	1st	2	21	11	3	7	37	21	36	Semi-final	Tursunali Rustamov	8	Numonjon Yusupov; Sharif Ziyoyev (Caretaker); Vitaliy Levchenko
2020	1st	2	18	11	2	5	30	23	35	Last 16	Dilshod Bozorov	8	Vitaliy Levchenko; Rustam Khojayev (Caretaker); Khakim Fuzailov
2021	1st	2	27	17	4	6	52	26	55	Winner	Dilshod Bozorov	13	Rustam Khojayev
2022	1st	3	22	9	7	6	29	18	34	Round of 16	Jahongir Ergashev	10	Rustam Khojayev
2023	1st	7	22	5	11	6	19	27	26				Rustam Khojayev; Numon Khasanov
2024	1st	2	22	13	4	5	38	16	43		Artyom Serdyuk	10	Rustam Khojayev
2025	1st	5	22	9	4	9	24	25	31				Rustam Khojayev; Aleksandr Krestinin

=== Continental history ===
As of match played 17 August 2022

Competition	Pld	W	D	L	GF	GA
Asian Cup Winners' Cup	4	1	1	2	5	8
AFC Cup	20	5	5	10	17	28
Total	24	6	6	12	22	36

Season	Competition	Round	Club	Home	Away	Aggregate
1998–99	Asian Cup Winners' Cup	First round – West Asia	(Uzbekistan) Pakhtakor Tashkent	1–1	1–4	2–5
1999–2000	Asian Cup Winners' Cup	First round – West Asia	(Kazakhstan) Kaisar	0–3	3–0	3–3(p)3–3
2016	AFC Cup	Play-off	(Palestine) Ahli Al-Khaleel	0–1		
2018	AFC Cup	Play-off	(Turkmenistan) Ahal	0–2	0–1	0–3
2019	AFC Cup	Play-off	(Turkmenistan) Ahal	1–1	0–0	1–1(a)
2019	AFC Cup	Group D	(Kyrgyzstan) Dordoi Bishkek	3–1	0–3	4th
2019	AFC Cup	Group D	(Turkmenistan) Altyn Asyr	0–0	0–1	4th
2019	AFC Cup	Group D	(Tajikistan) Istiklol	3–2	0–3	4th
2020	AFC Cup	Play-off	(Kyrgyzstan) Neftchi Kochkor-Ata	3–0	0–1	3–1
2020	AFC Cup	Group D	(Kyrgyzstan) Dordoi Bishkek	—N/a	—N/a	-
2020	AFC Cup	Group D	(Turkmenistan) Altyn Asyr	—N/a	—N/a	-
2020	AFC Cup	Group D	(Tajikistan) Istiklol	—N/a	0–2	-
2021	AFC Cup	Group F	(Kyrgyzstan) Alay	2–0	—N/a	3rd
2021	AFC Cup	Group F	(Turkmenistan) Altyn Asyr	—N/a	2–2	3rd
2021	AFC Cup	Group F	(Uzbekistan) Nasaf Qarshi	0–3	—N/a	3rd
2022	AFC Cup	Group F	(Kyrgyzstan) Dordoi Bishkek	0–0		1st
2022	AFC Cup	Group F	(Turkmenistan) Köpetdag Aşgabat	3–1		1st
2022	AFC Cup	Zonal finals	(Uzbekistan) Sogdiana Jizzakh	0–4		

== Honours ==
- Tajik Cup
  - Winners (6): 1998, 2002, 2008, 2017, 2021, 2026

== Sponsorship ==
On 28 March 2019, Khujand announced a sponsorship deal with Thai energy drink company Carabao.

On 26 October 2019, Samsung became the first title sponsor of Khujand with their Samsung UHD TV brand until the end of the 2020 season.

On 15 January 2021, Khujand announced that betting company "Formula 55" had replaced Samsung as their title sponsor.

Period	Kit manufacturer	Shirt sponsor
2019–2020	Joma	Samsung UHD TV
2021–	Joma	Formula 55

== Current squad ==
As of 9 March 2026

Note: Flags indicate national team as defined under FIFA eligibility rules; some limited exceptions apply. Players may hold more than one non-FIFA nationality.

No.	Pos.	Nation	Player
1	GK	SRB	Stefan Ilić
4	DF	TJK	Parviz Bokiev
5	DF	SRB	Darko Isailović
6	DF	TJK	Davronjon Ergashev
7	MF	TJK	Firuz Kholmatov
8	MF	SRB	Nikola Eskić
9	FW	TJK	Muhammadali Azizboev
10	DF	TJK	Dzhumaboy Akhmadzoda
11	MF	SRB	Jovan Anđelković
14	MF	GEO	Lasha Parunashvili
15	DF	SRB	Nikola Milanović
17	MF	TJK	Shukhratdzhon Shonazarov
18	MF	TJK	Parvizjon Aliyev

No.	Pos.	Nation	Player
19	DF	TJK	Khuseyn Nurmatov
22	MF	TJK	Bezhan Nishonboyzoda
23	DF	TJK	Firuz Karaev
25	FW	NGR	Emmanuel Garuba
28	MF	TJK	Komron Tursunov
30	MF	TJK	Mukimjon Todzhimurodov
47	DF	TJK	Merodzh Holov
60	MF	TJK	Khurshed-Timur Dzhuraev
62	FW	TJK	Jahongir Ergashev
70	MF	TJK	Ramazon Bakhtaliev
76	GK	TJK	Zukhriddin Muyidinov
88	FW	TJK	Fakhriddin Shermatov
