= 2021 FC Istiklol season =

FC Istiklol
2021 season
- President: Shohruh Saidov
- Manager: Vitaliy Levchenko; Mubin Ergashev (Interim) (AFC Champions League matches)
- Stadium: Republican Stadium
- Tajik League: Champions
- Tajikistan Cup: Runners-Up
- Super Cup: Winners
- AFC Champions League: Round of 16
- Top goalscorer: League: Manuchekhr Dzhalilov (18); All: Manuchekhr Dzhalilov (23)
Home colours	Away colours

The FC Istiklol 2021 season was Istiklol's thirteenth Tajik League season, of which they are defending Tajik League Champions, whilst they also participated in the Tajik Cup, Tajik Supercup and AFC Champions League.

== Season events ==
On 26 January, Istiklol announced that Manuchehr Safarov and Emomali Ahmadhon were on trial with the club, alongside various other Tajik and CIS players.

On 27 January, Istiklol were drawn in to Group of A of the 2021 AFC Champions League, alongside Al Hilal, Shabab Al-Ahli and one of either, Beijing Sinobo Guoan, Brisbane Roar or Kaya–Iloilo.

On 8 February, Istiklol announced that Sanzhar Rikhsiboev had joined them on trial from Bunyodkor. The following day, 9 February, Istiklol announced that Tabrezi Davlatmir had left the club to sign a one-year contract with Estonian Meistriliiga club Narva Trans. and that goalkeeper Mukhriddin Khasanov had joined the club on trial. On 10 February, Istiklol announced that Islom Zoirov had joined the club on trial.

On 11 February, Istiklol announced the return of Nuriddin Davronov on loan from Borneo until after the AFC Champions League group stages in the summer of 2021.

On 14 February, Istiklol announced that Yuriy Kolomoyets had joined the club on trial.

On 25 February, Istiklol announced that Tajik U16 goalkeeper Safarmad Gafforov had joined the club on trial.

On 3 March, Andriy Mischenko and Jovlon Ibrokhimov joined Istiklol on trial. Three days later, 6 March, Kennedy Igboananike also joined Istiklol on trial.

On 9 March, Nemanja Ilić joined Istiklol on trial, with Istiklol confirming that Ryota Noma was also on trial on 10 March.

On 11 March 2021, the AFC confirmed that Istiklol's Group A fixtures in the Champions League group stage would all take place in Riyadh, Saudi Arabia.

On 19 March, Huseyin Dogan joined Istiklol on trial.

On 29 March, Istiklol announced the signings of Andriy Mischenko, Ryota Noma and Huseyin Dogan to one-year contracts. On the same day, Istiklol also announced the signings of Mukhriddin Khasanov from Khujand and Safarmad Gaforov, Manuchehr Safarov and Islom Zoirov from Lokomotiv-Pamir.

On 6 April, Istiklol announced that Amadoni Kamolov had left the club to join Rayo Majadahonda.

On 13 April, Istiklol announced former manager Mubin Ergashev as their interim manager for their AFC Champions League group games due to having the required Pro Coaching License Vitaliy Levchenko did not.

On 7 June, Istiklol announced that they had parted ways with Huseyin Dogan by mutual consent.

On 28 June, Istiklol's next three home matches, against Dushanbe-83, Eskhata and Khatlon, where move to the Central Stadium in Hisor due to their regular Pamir Stadium in Dushanbe being used for the U17 CAFA Youth Championship.

On 19 July, Istiklol announced the signing of Shervoni Mabatshoev from CSKA Pamir Dushanbe, whilst Muhammadjon Rakhimov left the club to join Ordabasy and Daler Imomnazarov, Oleksandr Kucherenko and Vadim Yavorskiy all joined on trial.

On 5 August, Safarmad Gaforov joined Dynamo Dushanbe on loan for the remainder of the season.

On 7 August, Istiklol announced that they had signed Shokhrukh Kirgizboev from Kuktosh and Daler Imomnazarov from Dushanbe-83.

On 22 August, Istiklol the signing of Petar Patev on a free transfer from Slavia Sofia, on a contract until the end of the season.

On 7 November, Vahdat Hanonov and Manuchehr Safarov both left Istiklol to sign for Iranian club Persepolis, on contracts until 30 June 2024.

== Squad ==
As of match played 9 December 2021

No.	Name	Nationality	Position	Date of birth (age)	Signed from	Signed in	Contract ends	Apps.	Goals
Goalkeepers
1	Rustam Yatimov	(Tajikistan)	GK	13 July 1998 (aged 23)	Unattached	2018		60	0
16	Shokhrukh Kirgizboev	(Tajikistan)	GK	1 May 2002 (aged 19)	Kuktosh	2021		13	0
99	Mukhriddin Khasanov	(Tajikistan)	GK	23 September 2002 (aged 19)	Khujand	2021		16	0
Defenders
3	Andriy Mischenko	(Ukraine)	DF	7 April 1991 (aged 30)	Unattached	2021	2021	28	2
5	Iskandar Dzhalilov	(Tajikistan)	DF	1 June 1992 (aged 29)	Botev Vratsa	2019		60	2
6	Zoir Juraboev	(Tajikistan)	DF	16 September 1998 (aged 23)	Metallurg Bekabad	2019		83	5
19	Akhtam Nazarov	(Tajikistan)	DF	29 September 1992 (aged 29)	Bashundhara Kings	2020	2021	226	23
21	Oleksiy Larin	(Ukraine)	DF	4 June 1994 (aged 27)	Arsenal Kyiv	2019		89	4
22	Petar Patev	(Bulgaria)	DF	21 May 1993 (aged 28)	Slavia Sofia	2021	2021	10	1
27	Daler Imomnazarov	(Tajikistan)	DF	31 May 1995 (aged 26)	Dushanbe-83	2021	2023	19	0
Midfielders
10	Alisher Dzhalilov	(Tajikistan)	MF	29 August 1993 (aged 28)	Baltika Kaliningrad	2019		88	45
14	Sharifbek Rakhmatov	(Tajikistan)	MF	1 September 2002 (aged 19)	Youth Team	2020		24	0
17	Ryota Noma	(Japan)	MF	7 April 1991 (aged 30)	SKA-Khabarovsk	2021	2021	25	6
20	Amirbek Juraboev	(Tajikistan)	MF	13 April 1996 (aged 25)	Navbahor Namangan	2020	2021	131	7
28	Salam Ashurmamadov	(Tajikistan)	MF	18 March 2003 (aged 18)	Youth Team	2019	2021	27	4
70	Shakhrom Sulaimonov	(Tajikistan)	MF	27 June 1997 (aged 24)	Utenis Utena	2018		61	2
77	Khurshed-Timur Dzhuraev	(Tajikistan)	MF	21 September 1997 (aged 24)	Unattached	2019	2021	38	0
84	Islom Zoirov	(Tajikistan)	MF	12 January 2002 (aged 19)	Lokomotiv-Pamir	2021		28	2
Forwards
9	Rustam Soirov	(Tajikistan)	FW	12 September 2002 (aged 19)	Lokomotiv Pamir	2020		57	27
11	Shervoni Mabatshoev	(Tajikistan)	FW	4 December 2000 (aged 21)	CSKA Pamir Dushanbe	2021	2023	19	7
63	Manuchekhr Dzhalilov	(Tajikistan)	FW	27 September 1990 (aged 31)	Persebaya Surabaya	2020		145	132
	Amirjon Khudoidodov	(Tajikistan)	FW		Youth Team	2021		1	0
Youth team players
	Amir Nigmatov	(Tajikistan)	DF	28 April 1999 (aged 22)	Youth Team	2018		2	0
	Shahbol Rajabov	(Tajikistan)	DF	4 January 2000 (aged 21)	Youth Team	2018		1	0
Away on loan
16	Safarmad Gaforov	(Tajikistan)	GK	14 April 2004 (aged 17)	Lokomotiv-Pamir	2021		0	0
Left during the season
4	Vahdat Hanonov	(Tajikistan)	DF	25 July 2000 (aged 21)	CSKA Pamir Dushanbe	2020		44	8
7	Huseyin Dogan	(Netherlands)	FW	22 January 1994 (aged 27)	NAC Breda	2021	2021	7	1
8	Nuriddin Davronov	(Tajikistan)	MF	16 January 1991 (aged 30)	loan from Borneo	2021	2021		
11	Muhammadjon Rakhimov	(Tajikistan)	MF	15 October 1998 (aged 23)	Khosilot Farkhor	2017		108	22
18	Amadoni Kamolov	(Tajikistan)	MF	16 January 2003 (aged 18)	Lokomotiv-Pamir	2020		8	0
27	Romish Jalilov	(Tajikistan)	MF	21 November 1995 (aged 26)	Unattached	2020			
55	Manuchehr Safarov	(Tajikistan)	DF	31 May 2001 (aged 20)	Lokomotiv-Pamir	2021		29	6

=== Out on loan ===
Note: Flags indicate national team as defined under FIFA eligibility rules; some limited exceptions apply. Players may hold more than one non-FIFA nationality.

No. / Pos. / Nation / Player; 16 / GK / TJK / Safarmad Gaforov (at Dynamo Dushanbe)	No. / Pos. / Nation / Player

== Transfers ==
=== In ===
Date	Position	Nationality	Name	From	Fee	Ref.
29 March 2021	GK	(Tajikistan)	Safarmad Gaforov	Lokomotiv-Pamir	Undisclosed	
29 March 2021	GK	(Tajikistan)	Mukhriddin Khasanov	Khujand	Undisclosed	
29 March 2021	DF	(Tajikistan)	Manuchehr Safarov	Lokomotiv-Pamir	Undisclosed	
29 March 2021	DF	(Ukraine)	Andriy Mischenko	Unattached	Free	
29 March 2021	MF	(Japan)	Ryota Noma	SKA-Khabarovsk	Free	
29 March 2021	MF	(Tajikistan)	Islom Zoirov	Lokomotiv-Pamir	Undisclosed	
29 March 2021	FW	(Netherlands)	Huseyin Dogan	NAC Breda	Undisclosed	
19 July 2021	FW	(Tajikistan)	Shervoni Mabatshoev	CSKA Pamir Dushanbe	Free	
7 August 2021	GK	(Tajikistan)	Shokhrukh Kirgizboev	Kuktosh	Undisclosed	
7 August 2021	MF	(Tajikistan)	Daler Imomnazarov	Dushanbe-83	Undisclosed	
22 August 2021	DF	(Bulgaria)	Petar Patev	Slavia Sofia	Free	

=== Loans in ===
Date	Position	Nationality	Name	From	Fee	Ref.
11 February 2021	MF	(Tajikistan)	Nuriddin Davronov	Borneo	15 May 2021	

=== Out ===
Date	Position	Nationality	Name	To	Fee	Ref.
1 January 2021	MF	(Tajikistan)	Saidmuxtor Azimov	Istaravshan	Undisclosed	
9 February 2021	DF	(Tajikistan)	Tabrezi Davlatmir	Narva Trans	Undisclosed	
6 April 2021	MF	(Tajikistan)	Amadoni Kamolov	Rayo Majadahonda	Undisclosed	
19 July 2021	MF	(Tajikistan)	Muhammadjon Rakhimov	Ordabasy	Undisclosed	
7 November 2021	DF	(Tajikistan)	Vahdat Hanonov	Persepolis	Undisclosed	
7 November 2021	DF	(Tajikistan)	Manuchehr Safarov	Persepolis	Undisclosed	

=== Loans out ===
Date	Position	Nationality	Name	To	Fee	Ref.
5 August 2021	GK	(Tajikistan)	Safarmad Gaforov	Dynamo Dushanbe	End of season	

=== Released ===
Date	Position	Nationality	Name	Joined	Date	Ref
7 June 2021	FW	(Netherlands)	Huseyin Dogan	TOP Oss	22 September 2021	
30 June 2021	MF	(Tajikistan)	Romish Jalilov	Ravshan Kulob		
31 December 2021	GK	(Tajikistan)	Safarmad Gaforov	Regar-TadAZ Tursunzoda		
31 December 2021	DF	(Bulgaria)	Petar Patev	Spartak Varna	8 January 2022	
31 December 2021	DF	(Ukraine)	Oleksiy Larin	Pakhtakor Tashkent	10 February 2022	
31 December 2021	DF	(Ukraine)	Andriy Mischenko	AGMK		
31 December 2021	MF	(Tajikistan)	Khurshed-Timur Dzhuraev	CSKA Pamir Dushanbe		
31 December 2021	MF	(Tajikistan)	Salam Ashurmamadov	Broke Boys		
31 December 2021	MF	(Japan)	Ryota Noma	Barito Putera		

=== Trial ===
Date From	Position	Nationality	Name	Date To	Last club	Ref.
January 2021	DF	(Tajikistan)	Manuchehr Safarov		Lokomotiv-Pamir	
January 2021	MF	(Tajikistan)	Emomali Ahmadhon		Lokomotiv-Pamir	
5 February 2021	DF	(Ukraine)	Maksym Lopyryonok		Dnipro-1	
8 February 2021	MF	(Uzbekistan)	Sanzhar Rikhsiboev		Bunyodkor	
9 February 2021	GK	(Tajikistan)	Mukhriddin Khasanov		Khujand	
10 February 2021	FW	(Tajikistan)	Islom Zoirov		Lokomotiv-Pamir	
14 February 2021	FW	(Ukraine)	Yuriy Kolomoyets		Levadia	
25 February 2021	GK	(Tajikistan)	Safarmad Gafforov			
3 March 2021	DF	(Ukraine)	Andriy Mischenko		Okzhetpes	
3 March 2021	MF	(Uzbekistan)	Jovlon Ibrokhimov		Navbahor Namangan	
6 March 2021	FW	(Nigeria)	Kennedy Igboananike		IK Sirius	
9 March 2021	DF	(Serbia)	Nemanja Ilić		Samut Sakhon	
10 March 2021	MF	(Japan)	Ryota Noma		SKA-Khabarovsk	
19 March 2021	FW	(Netherlands)	Huseyin Dogan		NAC Breda	
19 July 2021	MF	(Tajikistan)	Daler Imomnazarov		Dushanbe-83	
19 July 2021	MF	(Ukraine)	Oleksandr Kucherenko		Inhulets Petrove	
19 July 2021	FW	(Ukraine)	Vadim Yavorskiy		Dnipro-1	

== Friendlies ==
27 February 2021	Istiklol	6–0	CSKA Pamir Dushanbe	Dushanbe
15:00 (UTC+5)	A.Dzhalilov 10', 31'; S.Ashurmamadov 24'; I.Dzhalilov 41'; Sulaimonov 73'; R.Nasrullo 83'	Report		Stadium: Pamir Stadium; Referee: Behruz Murtazoev

4 March 2021	Istiklol (Tajikistan)	2–2	(Kazakhstan) Taraz	Belek, Turkey
(UTC+5)	M.Dzhalilov 12'; Soirov 62' (pen.); Sulaimonov (yellow card); Rakhimov (yellow card)	Report	Larin 35' (o.g.); Eugénio 82'

7 March 2021	Istiklol (Tajikistan)	1–0	(Ukraine) Mykolaiv	Belek, Turkey
18:00 (UTC+5)	M.Dzhalilov 55'; Yatimov (yellow card); Z.Juraboev (yellow card)	Report

10 March 2021	Istiklol (Tajikistan)	1–0	(Kazakhstan) Okzhetpes	Belek, Turkey
(UTC+5)	Davronov 75' (pen.); S.Rakhmatov (yellow card); Hanonov (yellow card)	Report

12 March 2021	Istiklol (Tajikistan)	0–1	(Ukraine) Polissya Zhytomyr	Belek, Turkey
13:30 (UTC+5)		Report	V.Gritsuk 7'

19 March 2021	Istiklol	2–0	Regar-TadAZ	Dushanbe
10:00 (UTC+5)	S.Ashurmamadov 50', 65'	Report		Stadium: Pamir Stadium; Referee: Behruz Murtazoev

18 July 2021	Metallurg Bekabad (Uzbekistan)	0–1	(Tajikistan) Istiklol	Guliston, Uzbekistan
(UTC+5)		Report	Mabatshoev 55'

21 July 2021	Sogdiana Jizzakh (Uzbekistan)	2–0	(Tajikistan) Istiklol	Guliston, Uzbekistan
(UTC+5)	Norkhonov 52', 58'	Report		Referee: Ilgiz Tantashev (Uzbekistan)

24 July 2021	Lokomotiv Tashkent (Uzbekistan)	3–1	(Tajikistan) Istiklol	Tashkent, Uzbekistan
(UTC+5)	A.Dzhalilov 25'	Report	A.Amonov 69', 79'; Nazarov 72' (o.g.)	Stadium: Lokomotiv Stadium; Referee: Askar Najafaliev (Uzbekistan)

== TFF Cup ==
=== Preliminary round ===
Pos	Team	Pld	W	D	L	GF	GA	GD	Pts	Qualification
1	Istiklol	3	2	0	1	7	1	+6	6	Advance to Finals Stage
2	Dushanbe-83	3	1	1	1	3	3	0	4	Advance to Finals Stage
3	Barkchi	2	1	0	1	2	3	−1	3	
4	Vahdat	2	0	1	1	1	6	−5	1	

Updated to match(es) played on 28 January 2021. Source:

25 January 2021	Vahdat	0–5	Istiklol	Dushanbe
14:00 (UTC+5)		Report	M.Dzhalilov 8'; Sulaimonov 13'; Rakhimov 21', 28'; K-T.Dzhuraev 89' (yellow card)	Stadium: Pamir Stadium; Referee: Nasim Khamidov

28 January 2021	Barkchi	0–2	Istiklol	Dushanbe
10:30 (UTC+5)		Report	M.Dzhalilov 48' (yellow card); Jalilov (penalty missed) 51'; Soirov 61'; A.Dzhalilov (yellow card); S.Davlatov (yellow card)	Stadium: Pamir Stadium; Referee: Amirjon Khorkashev

30 January 2021	Istiklol	0–1	Dushanbe-83	Dushanbe
14:00 (UTC+5)	K-T.Dzhuraev (yellow card); Jalilov (yellow card); A.Yusupov (yellow card); S.Davlatov (yellow card); R.Davlatov (yellow card)	Report	S.Hotam 22' (pen.); J.Murodov (yellow card); A.Kaleb (yellow card)	Stadium: Pamir Stadium; Referee: Behruz Murtazoev

=== Finals Group ===
Pos	Team	Pld	W	D	L	GF	GA	GD	Pts	Qualification
1	(Tajikistan) Istiklol (Q)	3	3	0	0	12	1	+11	9	Advance to Semi-finals
2	(Tajikistan) Ravshan (Q)	3	2	0	1	7	7	0	6	Advance to Semi-finals
3	(Tajikistan) CSKA Pamir Dushanbe	3	1	0	2	4	6	−2	3	
4	(Tajikistan) Mastchoh	3	0	0	3	5	14	−9	0	

Updated to match(es) played on 13 February 2021. Source:
(Q) Qualified for the phase indicated

11 February 2021 1	CSKA Pamir Dushanbe	0–2	Istiklol	Dushanbe
14:00 (UTC+5)	M.Davlatbekov (yellow card); A.Karomatullozoda (yellow card); T.Felix (yellow card)	Report	S.Ashurmamadov 78'; Soirov 85'; A.Dzhalilov (yellow card)	Stadium: Pamir Stadium; Attendance: 0 Referee: Khurshed Dadaboev

13 February 2021 2	Istiklol	6–1	Mastchoh	Dushanbe
14:00 (UTC+5)	S.Ashurmamadov 17', 27', 31'; Jalilov 25'; Soirov 45', 69'; Nazarov (yellow card)	Report	D.Rustamzoda 90'; S.Badalzoda (yellow card); M.Rustamzoda (yellow card)	Stadium: Pamir Stadium; Referee: Sayvali Turdiev

15 February 2021 3	Ravshan	0–4	Istiklol	Dushanbe
14:00 (UTC+5)	D.Rozikov (yellow card)	Report	S.Ashurmamadov 64', 75'; A.Dzhalilov 67'; Soirov 90+2'; Nazarov (yellow card); A.Juraboev (yellow card)	Stadium: Pamir Stadium; Referee: Nasim Khamidov

=== Knockout phase ===
17 February 2021 Semifinal	Istiklol	3–2	Regar-TadAZ	Dushanbe
15:00 (UTC+5)	M.Dzhalilov 56' (pen.); S.Ashurmamadov 77'; Z.Juraboev 82'; A.Juraboev (yellow card); Lopyryonok (yellow card); Sulaimonov (yellow card); Larin (yellow card); A.Dzhalilov (yellow card)	Report	S.Makhamadiev 5' (yellow card); D.Ganiev 26'; A.Bobomurodov (yellow card)	Stadium: Pamir Stadium; Referee: Sayvali Turdiev

20 February 2021 Final	Khatlon	0–1	Istiklol	Dushanbe
15:00 (UTC+5)	Sharipov (yellow card); T.Bikatal; S.Avgonov (yellow card)	Report	Larin 90+3'; Nazarov (yellow card); Soirov (yellow card)	Stadium: Pamir Stadium; Referee: Khurshed Dadaboev

== Competitions ==
=== Tajik Supercup ===
3 April 2021	Istiklol	2–0	Ravshan	Hisor
16:00 (UTC+5)	Dogan 52'; A.Dzhalilov 60' (yellow card); M.Dzhalilov (yellow card); Hanonov (yellow card); Z.Juraboev (yellow card)	Report	N.Rustamov (yellow card)	Stadium: Central Stadium; Attendance: 5,500; Referee: Abdullo Davlatov

=== Tajik League ===
==== Results summary ====
Overall								Home						Away					
Pld	W	D	L	GF	GA	GD	Pts	W	D	L	GF	GA	GD	W	D	L	GF	GA	GD
27	21	5	1	78	9	+69	68	13	1	0	44	4	+40	8	4	1	34	5	+29

Last updated: 5 December 2021.
Source: See Results

==== Results by round ====
Round	1	2	3	4	5	6	7	8	9	10	11	12	13	14	15	16	17	18	19	20	21	22	23	24	25	26	27
Ground	H	A	A	H	A	H	H	A	A	H	H	A	A	H	A	H	H	H	H	A	H	H	A	A	H	A	A
Result	W	D	W	W	D	W	W	L	D	W	W	W	W	W	W	W	W	W	W	W	D	W	W	W	W	D	W
Position	10	9	8	8	8	4	2	3	4	2	2	2	1	1	1	1	1	1	1	1	1	1	1	1	1	1	1

Source: Results
A = Away; H = Home; W = Win; D = Draw; L = Loss

==== Results ====
9 May 2021 6	Istiklol	1–0	CSKA Pamir Dushanbe	Dushanbe
16:30 (UTC+5)	Dzhalilov 14' (yellow card); Mischenko (yellow card); K-T.Dzhuraev (yellow card)	Report	Fatkhuloev (penalty missed) 26' (yellow card)	Stadium: Pamir Stadium; Attendance: 200; Referee: Behruz Murtazoev

12 May 2021 1	Kuktosh Rudaki	1–1	Istiklol	Chorgulteppa
17:00 (UTC+5)	S.Rakhmonov 63'; M.Salomzda (yellow card)	Report	Z.Juraboev 60'; K-T.Dzhuraev (yellow card)	Stadium: Oilfield Stadium; Attendance: 3,500; Referee: Nasrullo Kabirov
Note: Match originally scheduled for 4 April, postponed due to Istiklol playing in the Super Cup on 3 April.

16 May 2021 7	Eskhata	0–2	Istiklol	Khujand
17:00 (UTC+5)	R.Saburov (yellow card); D.Dadoboev (yellow card)	Report	S.Ashurmamdov 55'; Soirov 90+2'; Hanonov (yellow card); K-T.Dzhuraev (yellow card)	Stadium: 20 Years of Independence Stadium; Attendance: 4,000; Referee: Sayvali Turdiev

21 June 2021 10	Istiklol	4–1	Khujand	Dushanbe
19:00 (UTC+5)	Soirov 3'; Rakhimov 33'; M.Dzhalilov 55'; Noma 69'	Report	Larin 46' (o.g.); E.Boboev (yellow card); D.Bozorov (yellow card)	Stadium: Pamir Stadium; Attendance: 400; Referee: Nasrullo Kabirov

27 June 2021 11	Ravshan	1–1	Istiklol	Qurghonteppa
17:30 (UTC+5)	H.Rustamov 62'; A.Kamchinov (yellow card); D.Shomurodov (yellow card); K.Effah (yellow card)	Report	Noma 83'; Hanonov (yellow card)	Stadium: Pakhtakor Stadium; Attendance: 3,000; Referee: Sayyodzhon Zainiddinov

30 June 2021 2	Istiklol	5–0	Dushanbe-83	Hisor
19:00 (UTC+5)	R.Izzatullo 8' (o.g.); Soirov 15'; Safarov 47'; Z.Juraboev 55'; Hanonov 85'	Report	Tagoe (yellow card); I.Arabadji (yellow card)	Stadium: Central Stadium; Attendance: 100; Referee: Rustam Nurmatov
Note: Match originally scheduled for 10 April, but postponed due to Istiklol playing in the AFC Champions League between 16 April and 1 May. Match played at the Central Stadium in Hisor instead of Istiklol's regular Pamir Stadium in Dushanbe due to U17 CAFA Youth Championship.

4 July 2021 12	Istiklol	5–1	Eskhata	Hisor
20:00 (UTC+5)	Soirov 4', 47', 63'; M.Dzhalilov 55' (pen.) (yellow card); A.Dzhalilov 64'	Report	D.Dadoboev (red card) 56'; A.Samadov (yellow card)	Stadium: Central Stadium; Attendance: 400; Referee: Abdullo Davlatov
Note: Match played at the Central Stadium in Hisor instead of Istiklol's regular Pamir Stadium in Dushanbe due to U17 CAFA Youth Championship.

7 July 2021 3	Istaravshan	2–1	Istiklol	Istaravshan
17:30 (UTC+5)	Barotov 45+1'; B.Abdurakhmonov 81' (yellow card); J.Safarov (yellow card); D.Boykuziev (yellow card)	Report	Noma 36'; Hanonov (yellow card); Soirov (yellow card)	Stadium: Istaravshan Sports Complex; Attendance: 9,000; Referee: Nasim Khamidov
Note: Match originally scheduled for 16 April, but postponed due to Istiklol playing in the AFC Champions League between 16 April and 1 May.

11 July 2021 13	CSKA Pamir Dushanbe	0–0	Istiklol	Dushanbe
17:30 (UTC+5)	I.Aminu (yellow card); K.Mirzonajod (yellow card); A.Okran (yellow card)	Report	Noma (yellow card)	Stadium: CSKA Stadium; Attendance: 200; Referee: Behruz Murtazoev

14 July 2021 4	Istiklol	2–0	Khatlon	Dushanbe
20:-00 (UTC+5)	Z.Juraboev 22'; Soirov 79' (pen.); S.Ashurmamdov (yellow card); Rakhimov (yellow card)	Report	K.Mirov (yellow card)	Stadium: Pamir Stadium; Attendance: 400; Referee: Nasrullo Kabirov
Note: Match originally scheduled for 24 April, but postponed due to Istiklol playing in the AFC Champions League between 16 April and 1 May.

8 August 2021 14	Istiklol	4–0	Fayzkand	Dushanbe
19:00 (UTC+5)	Mabatshoev 34'; A.Murodov 44' (o.g.); Zoirov 55' (yellow card); A.Dzhalilov 60'	Report	A.Baughnon (yellow card); A.Murodov (yellow card)	Stadium: Pamir Stadium; Attendance: 1,000; Referee: Rustam Nurmatov

15 August 2021 15	Khatlon	0–6	Istiklol	Qurghonteppa
20:30 (UTC+5)	Nazarov 15' (yellow card); M.Dzhalilov 28'; Hanonov 43'; Mabatshoev 75'; Soirov 82', 88'	Report		Stadium: Tsentralnyi Stadium; Attendance: 200; Referee: Khurshed Dadaboev

18 August 2021 5	Fayzkand	0–4	Istiklol	Dushanbe
19:00 (UTC+5)	Jasur Kurbonov (red card) 30'; M.Sadykov (yellow card)	Report	A.Dzhalilov 44', 52'; Safarov 58', 59'	Stadium: Pamir Stadium; Attendance: 550; Referee: Sayvali Turdiev
Note: Match originally scheduled for 30 April, but postponed due to Istiklol playing in the AFC Champions League between 16 April and 1 May. Match played at the Pamir Stadium in Dushanbe instead of Fayzkand's regular Central Stadium in Hulbuk.

21 August 2021 16	Istiklol	2–0	Istaravshan	Dushanbe
20:00 (UTC+5)	Hanonov 48'; A.Dzhalilov 90+1' (yellow card); Z.Juraboev (yellow card)	Report	S.Azimov (yellow card); J.Safarov (yellow card); K.Boboev (yellow card)	Stadium: Pamir Stadium; Attendance: 5,000; Referee: Abdullo Davlatov

24 August 2021 17	Dushanbe-83	0–5	Istiklol	Dushanbe
20:00 (UTC+5)	K.Abdulloev (yellow card); S.Asoev (yellow card)	Report	A.Dzhalilov 9', 43'; Safarov 23'; M.Dzhalilov 78' (yellow card); Hanonov 87'; Patev (yellow card)	Stadium: Pamir Stadium; Attendance: 700; Referee: Rustam Nurmatov

29 August 2021 18	Istiklol	7–1	Kuktosh Rudaki	Dushanbe
20:00 (UTC+5)	A.Dzhalilov 25', 70'; A.Juraboev 34' (red card); Mabatshoev 42'; M.Dzhalilov 72'; S.Ashurmamadov 76'; Soirov 82' (yellow card)	Report	S.Kholmatov 58'; N.Muhammadiev (yellow card)	Stadium: Pamir Stadium; Attendance: 100; Referee: Khurshed Dodoboev

5 September 2021 8	Istiklol	3–0	Ravshan	Dushanbe
17:00 (UTC+5)	M.Dzhalilov 13', 60' (yellow card); Zoirov 80'; Soirov (yellow card)	Report	S.Saydakhmad (yellow card)	Stadium: Pamir Stadium; Attendance: 200; Referee: Nasrullo Kabirov
Note: Match originally scheduled for 21 May, but postponed due to Ravshan playing in the AFC Cup between 14 and 20 May.

18 September 2021 19	Istiklol	2–0	Ravshan	Dushanbe
16:00 (UTC+5)	Mabatshoev 80' (pen.) (yellow card); Hanonov 90+4'; Safarov (yellow card); Patev (yellow card); Mischenko (yellow card); A.Dzhalilov (yellow card)	Report	O.Owusu (yellow card); B.Asamoah (yellow card); M.Akhmedov (yellow card); S.Saydakhmad (yellow card)	Stadium: Pamir Stadium; Attendance: 3,000; Referee: Sayvali Turdiev

21 September 2021 20	Istiklol	1–0	Khatlon	Dushanbe
16:00 (UTC+5)	M.Dzhalilov 79' (yellow card); Larin (yellow card)	Report	T.Bikatal (yellow card); K.Uzokov (yellow card); J.Gaten (yellow card); P.Baki-Akhunov (yellow card)	Stadium: Pamir Stadium; Attendance: 300; Referee: Abdullo Davlatov

26 September 2021 21	Istaravshan	0–1	Istiklol	Istaravshan
(UTC+5)	Ahmadov (yellow card); Barotov (yellow card)	Report	Larin 49'; A.Juraboev (yellow card)	Stadium: Istaravshan Sports Complex; Attendance: 5,500; Referee: Nasrullo Kabirov

3 October 2021 22	Istiklol	0–0	Khujand	Dushanbe
17:30 (UTC+5)	A.Dzhalilov (yellow card); A.Juraboev (yellow card); M.Dzhalilov (yellow card); Soirov (yellow card)	Report	O.Karimov (yellow card); F.Abdusalimov (yellow card); D.Bozorov (yellow card)	Stadium: Pamir Stadium; Attendance: 1,500; Referee: Sayvali Turdiev

3 November 2021 24	Istiklol	3–1	CSKA Pamir Dushanbe	Dushanbe
15:00 (UTC+5)	Noma 6'; Mischenko 16' (yellow card); Mabatshoev 21' (pen.); Patev (yellow card)	Report	Solehov 70'; K.Mirzonajod (yellow card); K.Mirzohon (yellow card); L.Mendjana (yellow card)	Stadium: Pamir Stadium; Attendance: 550; Referee: Nasrullo Kabirov

10 November 2021 23	Eskhata	0–3	Istiklol	Khujand
14:30 (UTC+5)	A.Samadov (yellow card); S.Abdurakhimov (yellow card); A.Inoyatov (yellow card) S.Umarov (yellow card)	Report	Patev 8'; M.Dzhalilov 33'; Soirov 65'; Mabatshoev (yellow card)	Stadium: 20 Years of Independence Stadium; Attendance: 1,200; Referee: Sayyodzhon Zainiddinov
Note: Match originally scheduled for 16 October 2021.

21 November 2021 25	Dushanbe-83	0–8	Istiklol	Dushanbe
14:00 (UTC+5)	K.Abdulloev (yellow card)	Report	M.Dzhalilov 4', 55', 75', 78'; A.Dzhalilov 6'; Soirov 38', 48', 83' (yellow card)	Stadium: Pamir Stadium; Attendance: 100; Referee: Khurshed Dadaboev

24 November 2021 26	Istiklol	5–0	Fayzkand	Dushanbe
14:00 (UTC+5)	A.Dzhalilov 13'; Mabatshoev 26'; M.Dzhalilov 51', 74' (pen.); Soirov 82'; A.Juraboev (yellow card)	Report	A.Boronov (yellow card); J.Feumba (yellow card); A.Andalibov (yellow card)	Stadium: Pamir Stadium; Attendance: 1,000; Referee: Nasim Khamidov

30 November 2021 9	Khujand	0–0	Istiklol	Khujand
14:00 (UTC+5)		Report	Soirov (yellow card); Mischenko (yellow card)	Stadium: 20 Years of Independence Stadium; Attendance: 1,700; Referee: Rustam Nurmatov
Note: Match originally scheduled for 25 May, but postponed due to International matches involving Tajikistan.

5 December 2021 27	Kuktosh Rudaki	1–2	Istiklol	Chorgulteppa
14:00 (UTC+5)	A.Safarov 43'; A.Sultonov (yellow card); M.Rakhmonov (yellow card); B.Shodiev (yellow card); K.Nazarov (yellow card); N.Makhmadiev	Report	M.Dzhalilov 12' (yellow card); A.Dzhalilov 41'; Sulaimonov (yellow card); A.Juraboev (yellow card); Mabatshoev (yellow card); I.Dzhalilov (yellow card)	Stadium: Oilfield Stadium; Attendance: 1,000; Referee: Nasrullo Kabirov

==== League table ====
Pos	Team	Pld	W	D	L	GF	GA	GD	Pts	Qualification or relegation
1	Istiklol (C)	27	21	5	1	78	9	+69	68	Qualification for AFC Champions League group stage
2	Khujand	27	17	4	6	52	26	+26	55	Qualification for AFC Cup play off round
3	CSKA Pamir	27	12	8	7	37	29	+8	44	Qualification for AFC Cup play off round
4	Istaravshan	27	12	6	9	30	25	+5	42	
5	Khatlon	27	10	6	11	30	33	−3	36	

Source: FFT
Rules for classification: 1) Points; 2) Head-to-head points; 3) Head-to-head goal difference; 4) Head-to-head goals scored; 5) Goal difference; 6) Goals scored.
(C) Champions

=== Tajikistan Cup ===
1 August 2021 Last 16	Istiklol	2–1	Dushanbe-83	Dushanbe
19:00 (UTC+5)	Hanonov 61'; Z.Juraboev 69'; Larin (yellow card)	Report	F.Kosimov 82'; O.Gayurov (yellow card); Tagoe (yellow card); I.Ruziev (yellow card)	Stadium: Pamir Stadium; Attendance: 1,000; Referee: Khurshed Dadoboev

15 October 2021 Quarterfinal	Istiklol	5–0	Fayzkand	Dushanbe
16:00 (UTC+5)	S.Ashurmamadov 2'; A.Baughnon 31' (o.g.); Larin 59'; Mischenko 66'; Mabatshoev 72'; Noma (yellow card); Soirov (yellow card)	Report	A.Andalibov (yellow card); A.Murodov (yellow card)	Stadium: Pamir Stadium; Attendance: 350; Referee: Khurshed Dadoboev

6 November 2021 Semifinal 1st leg	Istiklol	4–3	Eskhata Khujand	Dushanbe
14:30 (UTC+5)	M.Dzhalilov 8'; A.Dzhalilov 25'; Safarov 28'; Noma 38'; Soirov (yellow card)	Report	Ergashev 42', 71' (pen.); A.Inoyatov 74'; S.Abdurahimov (yellow card)	Stadium: Pamir Stadium; Attendance: 200; Referee: Rustam Nurmatov

27 November 2021 Semifinal 2nd leg	Eskhata Khujand	0–3 (3–7 agg.)	Istiklol	Khujand
14:00 (UTC+5)	S.Abdurakhimov (yellow card)	Report	M.Dzhalilov 38'; Soirov 50'; Noma 73'; Mischenko (yellow card)	Stadium: Spartak Stadium; Attendance: 1,000; Referee: Sayvali Turdiev

==== Final ====
9 December 2021	Istiklol	0–2	Khujand	Khujand
13:00 (UTC+5)	A.Juraboev (yellow card); M.Dzhalilov (yellow card); Soirov (yellow card)	Report	K.Ziyoev 105'; Serdyuk 117'; F.Abdusalimov (yellow card); N.Ibrohimzoda (yellow card); D.Edgorov (yellow card); Tursunov (yellow card)	Stadium: 20 Years of Independence Stadium; Attendance: 20,700; Referee: Behruz Murtazoev

=== AFC Champions League ===
==== Group stage ====
Pos	Team	Pld	W	D	L	GF	GA	GD	Pts	Qualification
1	(Tajikistan) Istiklol	6	3	1	2	10	8	+2	10 (Note: Head-to-head goal difference: Istiklol 1, Al Hilal −1.)	Advance to Round of 16
2	(Saudi Arabia) Al-Hilal (H)	6	3	1	2	11	9	+2	10	Advance to Round of 16
3	(United Arab Emirates) Shabab Al-Ahli	6	2	1	3	6	6	0	7 (Note: Head-to-head goal difference: Shabab Al-Ahli 1, AGMK −1.)	
4	(Uzbekistan) AGMK	6	2	1	3	9	13	−4	7	

Source: AFC
Rules for classification: Tiebreakers
(H) Hosts
Notes:

16 April 2021 1	Istiklol (Tajikistan)	0–0	(United Arab Emirates) Shabab Al Ahli	Riyadh, Saudi Arabia
00:00 (UTC+5)	Rakhimov (yellow card) 83'; Soirov (yellow card) 90+1'	Report	Igor Jesus (yellow card) 70'	Stadium: King Fahd International Stadium; Attendance: 0 Referee: Hettikamkanamge Perera (Sri Lanka)
Note: Match played behind closed doors due to the COVID-19 pandemic in Saudi Arabia.

19 April 2021 2	AGMK (Uzbekistan)	2–3	(Tajikistan) Istiklol	Riyadh, Saudi Arabia
00:00 (UTC+5)	Polvonov 57', 90+1'		Đokić 45+1' (o.g.); M.Dzhalilov 55'; Rakhimov 81'	Stadium: King Fahd International Stadium; Attendance: 0 Referee: Mohd Amirul Izwan Yaacob (Malaysia)
Note: Match played behind closed doors due to the COVID-19 pandemic in Saudi Arabia.

22 April 2021 3	Al Hilal (Saudi Arabia)	3–1	(Tajikistan) Istiklol	Riyadh, Saudi Arabia
00:00 (UTC+5)	Al Bulaihi 39'; Bahebri 52', 64'	Report	Davronov (yellow card) 4'; Hanonov 39'	Stadium: Prince Faisal bin Fahd Stadium; Attendance: 0 Referee: Masoud Tufayelieh (Syria)
Note: Match played behind closed doors due to the COVID-19 pandemic in Saudi Arabia.

25 April 2021 4	Istiklol (Tajikistan)	4–1	(Saudi Arabia) Al Hilal	Riyadh, Saudi Arabia
00:00 (UTC+5)	M.Dzhalilov 39', 44'; Safarov 49', 53'; Juraboev (yellow card) 90'	Report	Gomis 24'	Stadium: Prince Faisal bin Fahd Stadium; Attendance: 0 Referee: Omar Al-Yaqoubi (Oman)
Note: Match played behind closed doors due to the COVID-19 pandemic in Saudi Arabia.

28 April 2021 5	Shabab Al Ahli (United Arab Emirates)	0–1	(Tajikistan) Istiklol	Riyadh, Saudi Arabia
00:00 (UTC+5)	M.Hassan (yellow card) 37'; H.Suhail (yellow card) 38'; Marzooq (yellow card) 80'	Report	A.Dzhalilov (yellow card) 13' (goal) 90+6'; Mischenko (yellow card) 51'; Davronov (yellow card) 71'; Nazarov (yellow card) 88'	Stadium: Prince Faisal bin Fahd Stadium; Attendance: 0 Referee: Mohd Amirul Izwan Yaacob (Malaysia)
Note: Match played behind closed doors due to the COVID-19 pandemic in Saudi Arabia.

1 May 2021 6	Istiklol (Tajikistan)	1–2	(Uzbekistan) AGMK	Riyadh, Saudi Arabia
00:00 (UTC+5)	Sulaimonov (yellow card) 29'; Mischenko (yellow card) 74'; Soirov 87' (pen.)	Report	S.Rakhmanov (yellow card) 54'; Z.Polvonov 67'; Đokić 79'; Ergashev (yellow card) 90+1'	Stadium: King Fahd International Stadium; Attendance: 0 Referee: Mohanad Qasim Sarray (Iraq)
Note: Match played behind closed doors due to the COVID-19 pandemic in Saudi Arabia.

==== Knockout stage ====
14 September 2021 Round of 16	Istiklol (Tajikistan)	0–1	(Iran) Persepolis	Dushanbe, Tajikistan
20:00 (UTC+5)	Safarov (yellow card) 80'	Report	Faraji (yellow card) 19'; Sarlak (yellow card) 79'; Torabi 90'	Stadium: Pamir Stadium; Attendance: 17,200; Referee: Hiroyuki Kimura (Japan)

== Squad statistics ==
As of match played 9 December 2021

=== Appearances and goals ===
No.	Pos	Nat	Player	Total		Tajik League		Tajikistan Cup		Super Cup		AFC Champions League	
No.	Pos	Nat	Player	Apps	Goals	Apps	Goals	Apps	Goals	Apps	Goals	Apps	Goals
1	GK	(Tajikistan) TJK	Rustam Yatimov	14	0	7	0	0	0	1	0	6	0
3	DF	(Ukraine) UKR	Andriy Mischenko	28	2	18+1	1	2	1	1	0	6	0
5	DF	(Tajikistan) TJK	Iskandar Dzhalilov	6	0	2+2	0	1+1	0	0	0	0	0
6	DF	(Tajikistan) TJK	Zoir Juraboev	37	4	24+1	3	5	1	0+1	0	6	0
9	FW	(Tajikistan) TJK	Rustam Soirov	37	17	17+7	15	3+2	1	0+1	0	4+3	1
10	MF	(Tajikistan) TJK	Alisher Dzhalilov	39	15	27	12	4	1	1	1	7	1
11	FW	(Tajikistan) TJK	Shervoni Mabatshoev	19	7	13	6	4+1	1	0	0	0+1	0
14	MF	(Tajikistan) TJK	Sharifbek Rakhmatov	23	0	3+16	0	0+3	0	0	0	0+1	0
16	GK	(Tajikistan) TJK	Shokhrukh Kirgizboev	13	0	8+1	0	4	0	0	0	0	0
17	MF	(Japan) JPN	Ryota Noma	25	6	7+12	4	4	2	1	0	0+1	0
19	DF	(Tajikistan) TJK	Akhtam Nazarov	30	1	13+7	1	2+1	0	1	0	5+1	0
20	MF	(Tajikistan) TJK	Amirbek Juraboev	26	1	17+3	1	5	0	0	0	1	0
21	DF	(Ukraine) UKR	Oleksiy Larin	38	2	26	1	4	1	1	0	7	0
22	DF	(Bulgaria) BUL	Petar Patev	10	1	3+6	1	0+1	0	0	0	0	0
27	DF	(Tajikistan) TJK	Daler Imomnazarov	19	0	8+6	0	4+1	0	0	0	0	0
28	MF	(Tajikistan) TJK	Salam Ashurmamadov	22	3	2+16	2	1+1	1	0+1	0	0+1	0
63	FW	(Tajikistan) TJK	Manuchekhr Dzhalilov	32	23	20	18	4	2	1	0	7	3
70	MF	(Tajikistan) TJK	Shakhrom Sulaimonov	22	0	8+4	0	1+2	0	0+1	0	6	0
77	MF	(Tajikistan) TJK	Khurshed-Timur Dzhuraev	14	0	6+3	0	0+1	0	0	0	0+4	0
84	MF	(Tajikistan) TJK	Islom Zoirov	28	2	14+9	2	1+3	0	0	0	1	0
99	GK	(Tajikistan) TJK	Mukhriddin Khasanov	16	0	12+2	0	1	0	0	0	1	0
	FW	(Tajikistan) TJK	Amirjon Khudoidodov	1	0	0+1	0	0	0	0	0	0	0
Youth team players:
Players away from Istiklol on loan:
Players who left Istiklol during the season:
4	DF	(Tajikistan) TJK	Vahdat Hanonov	31	7	15+5	5	3	1	0+1	0	3+4	1
7	FW	(Netherlands) NED	Huseyin Dogan	7	1	3	0	0	0	1	1	3	0
8	MF	(Tajikistan) TJK	Nuriddin Davronov	6	0	0	0	0	0	1	0	5	0
11	MF	(Tajikistan) TJK	Muhammadjon Rakhimov	15	2	7+2	1	0	0	1	0	3+2	1
27	MF	(Tajikistan) TJK	Romish Jalilov	3	0	0+3	0	0	0	0	0	0	0
55	DF	(Tajikistan) TJK	Manuchehr Safarov	29	5	17+2	3	2+1	0	1	0	6	2

=== Goal scorers ===
Place	Position	Nation	Number	Name	Tajik League	Tajikistan Cup	Super Cup	AFC Champions League	Total
1	FW	(Tajikistan)	63	Manuchekhr Dzhalilov	18	2	0	3	23
2	FW	(Tajikistan)	9	Rustam Soirov	15	1	0	1	17
3	MF	(Tajikistan)	10	Alisher Dzhalilov	12	1	1	1	15
5	FW	(Tajikistan)	11	Shervoni Mabatshoev	6	1	0	0	7
5	DF	(Tajikistan)	4	Vahdat Hanonov	5	1	0	1	7
7	MF	(Japan)	17	Ryota Noma	4	2	0	0	6
7	DF	(Tajikistan)	55	Manuchehr Safarov	3	1	0	2	6
8	DF	(Tajikistan)	6	Zoir Juraboev	3	1	0	0	4
8				Own goal	2	1	0	1	4
10	MF	(Tajikistan)	28	Salam Ashurmamadov	2	1	0	0	3
11	MF	(Tajikistan)	84	Islom Zoirov	2	0	0	0	2
11	DF	(Ukraine)	21	Oleksiy Larin	1	1	0	0	2
11	DF	(Ukraine)	3	Andriy Mischenko	1	1	0	0	2
11	MF	(Tajikistan)	11	Muhammadjon Rakhimov	1	0	0	1	2
15	DF	(Tajikistan)	19	Akhtam Nazarov	1	0	0	0	1
15	MF	(Tajikistan)	20	Amirbek Juraboev	1	0	0	0	1
15	DF	(Bulgaria)	22	Petar Patev	1	0	0	0	1
15	FW	(Netherlands)	7	Huseyin Dogan	0	0	1	0	1
TOTALS					78	14	2	10	104

=== Clean sheets ===
Place	Position	Nation	Number	Name	Tajik League	Tajikistan Cup	Super Cup	AFC Champions League	Total
1	GK	(Tajikistan)	99	Mukhriddin Khasanov	11	0	0	0	11
2	GK	(Tajikistan)	16	Shokhrukh Kirgizboev	7	2	0	0	9
3	GK	(Tajikistan)	1	Rustam Yatimov	3	0	1	2	6
TOTALS					19	2	1	2	24

Yatimov & Khasanov both played in Istiklol 5–0 victory over Dushanbe-83 on 30 June 2021
Khasanov & Kirgizboev both played in Istiklol 5–0 victory over Dushanbe-83 on 24 August 2021

=== Disciplinary record ===
Number	Nation	Position	Name	Tajik League		Tajikistan Cup		Super Cup		AFC Champions League		Total	
Number	Nation	Position	Name	Booked	Sent off (straight red)	Booked	Sent off (straight red)	Booked	Sent off (straight red)	Booked	Sent off (straight red)	Booked	Sent off (straight red)
3	(Ukraine)	DF	Andriy Mischenko	4	0	1	0	0	0	1	0	6	0
5	(Tajikistan)	DF	Iskandar Dzhalilov	1	0	0	0	0	0	0	0	1	0
6	(Tajikistan)	DF	Zoir Juraboev	0	0	0	0	1	0	1	0	2	0
9	(Tajikistan)	FW	Rustam Soirov	6	0	3	0	0	0	1	0	10	0
10	(Tajikistan)	MF	Alisher Dzhalilov	3	0	0	0	1	0	1	0	5	0
11	(Tajikistan)	FW	Shervoni Mabatshoev	3	0	0	0	0	0	0	0	3	0
17	(Japan)	MF	Ryota Noma	1	0	1	0	0	0	0	0	2	0
19	(Tajikistan)	DF	Akhtam Nazarov	1	0	0	0	0	0	1	0	2	0
20	(Tajikistan)	MF	Amirbek Juraboev	4	1	1	0	0	0	0	0	5	1
21	(Ukraine)	DF	Oleksiy Larin	1	0	1	0	0	0	0	0	2	0
22	(Bulgaria)	DF	Petar Patev	3	0	0	0	0	0	0	0	3	0
28	(Tajikistan)	MF	Salam Ashurmamadov	1	0	0	0	0	0	0	0	1	0
63	(Tajikistan)	FW	Manuchekhr Dzhalilov	7	0	1	0	1	0	0	0	9	0
70	(Tajikistan)	MF	Shakhrom Sulaimonov	1	0	0	0	0	0	1	0	2	0
77	(Tajikistan)	MF	Khurshed-Timur Dzhuraev	3	0	0	0	0	0	0	0	3	0
84	(Tajikistan)	MF	Islom Zoirov	1	0	0	0	0	0	0	0	1	0
Players who left Istiklol during the season:
4	(Tajikistan)	DF	Vahdat Hanonov	4	0	0	0	1	0	0	0	5	0
8	(Tajikistan)	MF	Nuriddin Davronov	0	0	0	0	0	0	2	0	2	0
11	(Tajikistan)	MF	Muhammadjon Rakhimov	1	0	0	0	0	0	1	0	2	0
55	(Tajikistan)	DF	Manuchehr Safarov	1	0	0	0	0	0	1	0	2	0
			TOTALS	46	1	8	0	4	0	10	0	68	1
