= 2021 Tajikistan Cup =

Tournament details
- Country: Tajikistan
- Dates: 24 May 2021 – 9 December 2021
- Teams: 22

Final positions
- Champions: Khujand
- Runners-up: Istiklol

Tournament statistics
- Matches played: 23
- Goals scored: 90 (3.91 per match)
- Top goal scorer: Akbar Bobomurodov (4)
- All statistics correct as of 9 December 2021.

The 2021 Tajikistan Cup was the 30th edition of the Tajikistan Cup, the knockout football tournament of Tajikistan, with the winner of the cup qualifying for the 2022 AFC Cup.

== Format ==
On 15 May, the preliminary round of the Tajikistan Cup was drawn at the Offices of the Tajikistan Football Federation, with the preliminary round matches taking place on 24 May.

On 12 June, the draw for the Last 16 took place.

On 2 August, the day after the last four of the "Last 16" matches had taken place, the draw for the Quarterfinals was announced.

== Teams ==
Round	Clubs remaining	Clubs involved	Winners from previous round	New entries this round	Leagues entering at this round
Preliminary round	12	12	none	none	12 Tajikistan First League teams
Last 16	16	16	6	10	10 Tajikistan Higher League teams
Quarterfinals	8	8	8	none	none
Semifinals	4	4	4	none	none
Final	2	2	2	none	none

== Round and draw dates ==
Round	Draw date	Draw venue	First match date	Ref.
Preliminary round	15 May 2021	Dushanbe	24 May 2021	
Last 16	12 June 2021	Dushanbe	31 July 2021	
Quarterfinals	2 August 2021	Dushanbe		
Semifinals				
Final				

== Preliminary round ==
24 May 2021	Regar-TadAZ	11–0	Isfara	Tursunzoda
(UTC+5)	Karaev 5' (pen.); Elmurodov 16'; Bakhtiyorzoda 19'; Sharipov 21'; Hotam 27'; Bobomurodov 30', 68'; Makhamadiev 37'; Ahmadkhon 43'; Khaitov 54'; Ergashev 85'	Report		Stadium: TALCO Arena

24 May 2021	Mohir	1–0	Barkchi	Yovon
(UTC+5)	Zulpaliev 1'	Report

24 May 2021	Saroykamar Panj	3–2	Khayr Vahdat	Panj
(UTC+5)	Malodustov 61', 90+3'; Rasulov 73'	Report	Azizov 26' (pen.); Narzulloev 37'

24 May 2021	Panjshir	2–0	Ravshan Zafarobod	Balkh
(UTC+5)	Khudoynazarov 65' (pen.), 75'	Report

24 May 2021	Dynamo Dushanbe	1–3	Hulbuk Vose	Dushanbe
(UTC+5)	Akhtamov 90+2'	Report	Alikhonov 21'; Aslonov 41'; Rasulov 88'

24 May 2021	Pakhtakor	3–2 (a.e.t.)	Khosilot Farkhor
(UTC+5)	Mukhiddinov 10'; Sharipov 50'; Boboev 108'	Report	Somon 20'; Azizov 58'

== Last 16 ==
31 July 2021	Eskhata	3–0	Saroykamar Panj	Khujand
(UTC+5)	Rakhimov 2' (o.g.); Turaev 8'; Rakhimov 24'	Report		Stadium: Spartak Stadium; Attendance: 300; Referee: Nasrullo Kabirov

31 July 2021	Regar-TadAZ	3–6	Khatlon	Tursunzoda
(UTC+5)	Bobomurodov 66', 90'; Burizod 83'	Report	Ismoilov 17', 29', 38'; Ismoilov 24'; Alinazarov 48'; Gaten 74'	Stadium: TALCO Arena; Attendance: 1,500; Referee: Nasim Khamidov

31 July 2021	CSKA Pamir	5–1	Panjshir	Dushanbe
(UTC+5)	Solekhov 47'; Abdugafforov 69'; Vasiev 85'; Kovussho 89'; Kholikov 90+2' (pen.)	Report	Gayurov 8'	Stadium: CSKA Stadium; Attendance: 200; Referee: Abdullo Davlatov

31 July 2021	Hulbuk Vose	1–3	Ravshan	Hulbuk
(UTC+5)	Saidkhoja 37'	Report	Fuzailov 20'; Rustamov 67'; Effah 68'	Stadium: Central Stadium; Attendance: 4,500; Referee: Sayvali Turdiev

1 August 2021	Istiklol	2–1	Dushanbe-83	Dushanbe
19:00 (UTC+5)	Hanonov 61'; Z.Juraboev 69'	Report	Kosimov 82'	Stadium: Pamir Stadium; Attendance: 1,000; Referee: Khurshed Dadoboev

1 August 2021	Khujand	6–0	Pakhtakor	Khujand
(UTC+5)	Bokiev 4'; Boboev 35'; Serdyuk 54'; Edgorov 59' (pen.), 62'; Babadjanov 88'	Report		Stadium: 20 Years of Independence Stadium; Attendance: 2,500; Referee: Behruz Murtazoev

1 August 2021	Kuktosh	0–1	Istaravshan	Chorgulteppa
(UTC+5)		Report	Azimov 25'	Stadium: Oilfield stadium Attendance: 3,000; Referee: Sayojon Zainiddinov

1 August 2021	Mohir	0–1	Fayzkand	Yovon
(UTC+5)		Report	Murodov 88'	Stadium: Central Stadium; Attendance: 1,100; Referee: Amirjon Khorkashev

== Quarterfinals ==
11 September 2021	Khujand	1–0	Khatlon	Khujand
(UTC+5)	Yodgorov 61'	Report		Stadium: 20 Years of Independence Stadium; Attendance: 1,500; Referee: Amirjon Khorkashev

12 September 2021	Istaravshan	1–1 (a.e.t.) (2–3 p)	Eskhata	Khujand
(UTC+5)	Uktamov 14'	Report	Saburov 12'	Stadium: Spartak Stadium; Attendance: 3,300; Referee: Sayyodjon Zayniddinov
	Penalties
	Safarov (penalty missed); O.Karimov (penalty scored); Mamurjonov (penalty missed); Azimov (penalty scored); Uktamov (penalty missed)		Karimov (penalty missed); Inoyatov (penalty scored); Karimjonov (penalty scored); Abdurahimov (penalty missed); Hakimov (penalty scored)

12 September 2021	CSKA Pamir	1–2	Ravshan	Dushanbe
(UTC+5)	Gafforov 7'	Report	Rustamov 12'; Saidkhodja 45+2'	Stadium: CSKA Stadium; Attendance: 500; Referee: Khurshed Dadoboev

15 October 2021	Istiklol	5–0	Fayzkand	Dushanbe
16:00 (UTC+5)	Ashurmamdov 2'; Baughnon 31' (o.g.); Larin 59'; Mischenko 66'; Mabatshoev 72'	Report		Stadium: Pamir Stadium; Attendance: 350; Referee: Khurshed Dadoboev

== Semifinals ==
6 November 2021 First Leg	Istiklol	4–3	Eskhata	Dushanbe
14:30 (UTC+5)	M.Dzhalilov 8'; A.Dzhalilov 25'; Safarov 28'; Noma 38'	Report	Ergashev 42', 71' (pen.); Inoyatov 74'	Stadium: Pamir Stadium; Attendance: 200; Referee: Rustam Nurmatov

7 November 2021 First Leg	Khujand	4–0	Ravshan	Khujand
14:30 (UTC+5)	Babadjanov 20'; Tursunov 39'; D.Bozorov 73', 80'	Report		Stadium: 20 Years of Independence Stadium; Attendance: 2,000

27 November 2021 Second Leg	Eskhata	0–3 (3–7 agg.)	Istiklol	Khujand
14:00 (UTC+5)		Report	M.Dzhalilov 38'; Soirov 50'; Noma 73'	Stadium: Spartak Stadium; Attendance: 1,000; Referee: Sayvali Turdiev

27 November 2021 Second Leg	Ravshan	2–0 (2–4 agg.)	Khujand	Kulab
13:30 (UTC+5)	M.Saidkhoja 23'; A.Kamchinov 59'	Report		Stadium: Central Stadium; Attendance: 1,000; Referee: Amirjon Khorkashev

== Final ==
9 December 2021	Istiklol	0–2 (a.e.t.)	Khujand	Khujand
13:00 (UTC+5)		Report	K.Ziyoev 105'; Serdyuk 117'	Stadium: 20 Years of Independence Stadium; Attendance: 20,700; Referee: Behruz Murtazoev

== Scorers ==
As of match played 9 December 2021

4 goals:

- (Tajikistan) Akbar Bobomurodov – Regar-TadAZ

3 goals:

- (Tajikistan) Muhammadsharif Saidkhodja – Hulbuk Vose/Ravshan
- (Tajikistan) Sunatullo Ismoilov – Khatlon

2 goals:

- (Tajikistan) Jahongir Ergashev – Eskhata
- (Japan) Ryota Noma – Istiklol
- (Tajikistan) Manuchekhr Dzhalilov – Istiklol
- (Russia) Artyom Serdyuk – Khujand
- (Tajikistan) Nozim Babadjanov – Khujand
- (Tajikistan) Dilshod Bozorov – Khujand
- (Tajikistan) Daler Edgorov – Khujand
- (Tajikistan) Shavkat Khudoynazarov – Panjshir
- (Tajikistan) Hasan Rustamov – Ravshan
- (Tajikistan) Himatullo Malodustov – Saroykamar Panj

1 goals:

- (Tajikistan) Mukhsinjon Abdugafforov – CSKA Pamir
- (Tajikistan) Shodibek Gafforov – CSKA Pamir
- (Tajikistan) Umedzhon Kholikov – CSKA Pamir
- (Tajikistan) Sayyodi Kovussho – CSKA Pamir
- (Tajikistan) Sharafjon Solekhov – CSKA Pamir
- (Tajikistan) Dilshod Vasiev – CSKA Pamir
- (Tajikistan) Farhod Kosimov – Dushanbe-83
- (Tajikistan) Fakhriddin Akhtamov – Dynamo Dushanbe
- (Tajikistan) Ahrorjon Inoyatov – Eskhata
- (Tajikistan) Amirjon Rakhimov – Eskhata
- (Tajikistan) Rustamjon Saburov – Eskhata
- (Uzbekistan) Akobir Turaev – Eskhata
- (Tajikistan) Anvar Murodov – Fayzkand
- (Tajikistan) Amirjon Alikhonov – Hulbuk Vose
- (Tajikistan) Gurez Aslonov – Hulbuk Vose
- (Tajikistan) Samariddin Rasulov – Hulbuk Vose
- (Tajikistan) Saidmukhtor Azimov – Istaravshan
- (Tajikistan) Ahrorbek Uktamov – Istaravshan
- (Tajikistan) Salam Ashurmamdov – Istiklol
- (Tajikistan) Alisher Dzhalilov – Istiklol
- (Tajikistan) Vahdat Hanonov – Istiklol
- (Tajikistan) Zoir Juraboev – Istiklol
- (Tajikistan) Shervoni Mabatshoev – Istiklol
- (Tajikistan) Manuchehr Safarov – Istiklol
- (Tajikistan) Rustam Soirov – Istiklol
- (Ukraine) Oleksiy Larin – Istiklol
- (Ukraine) Andriy Mischenko – Istiklol
- (Cameroon) Jen Gaten – Khatlon
- (Tajikistan) Firdavs Alinazarov – Khatlon
- (Tajikistan) Komronjon Ismoilov – Khatlon
- (Tajikistan) Umejon Azizov – Khayr Vahdat
- (Tajikistan) Faridun Narzulloev – Khayr Vahdat
- (Tajikistan) Khairullo Azizov – Khosilot Farkhor
- (Tajikistan) Isroil Somon – Khosilot Farkhor
- (Tajikistan) Ekhson Boboev – Khujand
- (Tajikistan) Parviz Bokiev – Khujand
- (Tajikistan) Komron Tursunov – Khujand
- (Tajikistan) Daler Yodgorov – Khujand
- (Tajikistan) Khodzhiboy Ziyoev – Khujand
- (Tajikistan) Akmal Zulpaliev – Mohir
- (Tajikistan) Farhojon Boboev – Pakhtakor
- (Tajikistan) Bahriddin Mukhiddinov – Pakhtakor
- (Tajikistan) Daler Sharipov – Pakhtakor
- (Tajikistan) Mahmud Gayurov – Panjshir
- (Tajikistan) Ziyovuddin Fuzailov – Ravshan
- (Tajikistan) Avaz Kamchinov – Ravshan
- (Ghana) Kingsley Osei Effah – Ravshan
- (Tajikistan) Emomali Ahmadkhon – Regar-TadAZ
- (Tajikistan) Parviz Bakhtiyorzoda – Regar-TadAZ
- (Tajikistan) Muhammad Burizod – Regar-TadAZ
- (Tajikistan) Shukhrat Elmurodov – Regar-TadAZ
- (Tajikistan) Amin Ergashev – Regar-TadAZ
- (Tajikistan) Shavkati Hotam – Regar-TadAZ
- (Tajikistan) Firuz Karaev – Regar-TadAZ
- (Tajikistan) Azizbek Khaitov – Regar-TadAZ
- (Tajikistan) Sherzod Makhamadiev – Regar-TadAZ
- (Tajikistan) Alisher Sharipov – Regar-TadAZ
- (Tajikistan) Munis Rasulov – Saroykamar Panj

Own goals:

- (Tajikistan) Khisrav Rakhimov – Eskhata vs Saroykamar Panj 31 July 2021
- (Cameroon) Arthur Baughnon – Istiklol vs Fayzkand 15 October 2021

== See also ==
- 2021 Tajikistan Higher League
- 2021 Tajikistan First League
