= Khuseyn Nurmatov =

Tajik footballer

Personal information
- Full name: Khuseyn Olimkhonovich Nurmatov
- Date of birth: 10 May 2000 (age 26)
- Place of birth: Bokhtar, Tajikistan
- Height: 1.65 m (5 ft 5 in)
- Position: Left-back

Team information
- Current team: Khujand
- Number: 19

Youth career
- –2016: Lokomotiv-Pamir

Senior career*
Years	Team	Apps	(Gls)
2017–2019	Barqchi Hisor	22	(0)
2020	Khatlon Bokhtar	17	(0)
2020–2022	Istaravshan	48	(1)
2023	Eskhata Khujand	20	(0)
2024	Khosilot Farkhor	10	(0)
2024–2025	Khatlon	18	(1)
2025	Istaravshan	10	(0)
2026–	Khujand	2	(0)

International career^{‡}
2017	Tajikistan U18	2	(0)
2018	Tajikistan U19	3	(0)
2021–	Tajikistan U23	2	(0)
2021–	Tajikistan	1	(0)
- * Club domestic league appearances and goals as of 5 February 2022 (UTC) ‡ National team caps and goals as of 5 February 2022 (UTC)

Khuseyn Olimkhonovich Nurmatov (Tajik: Ҳусейн Нурматов, Russian: Нурматов Хусейн Олимхонович; born 10 May 2000) is a Tajik professional football player who currently plays as a defender for Khujand and the Tajik national team.

== Career ==
=== Club ===
==== Lokomotiv-Pamir ====
Nurmatov started his career at the Lokomotiv-Pamir club in Dushanbe. At the age of 14, he made his professional debut in the 1/8 final of the Tajikistan Cup against Ravshan.

==== Barkchi Hisor ====
Nurmatov left Lokomotiv-Pamir of September 2016, to sign a contract with Barkchi Hisor.

==== Khatlon Bokhtar ====
In January 2020, Nurmatov signed a new contract with Khatlon. He made his league match against Istaravshan on April 5, 2020. A week later, he assisted his team's winning goal in the match with Khujand.

==== Istaravshan ====
In February 2021, Nurmatov was announced as a new signing for FK Istaravshan prior to the start of the 2021–22 season. He made his debut for Istaravshan on April 6, 2021, in a league match against Ravshan.

=== International ===
Nurmatov took part in the 8th international tournament for the Cup of the President of Kazakhstan with the national youth football team of Tajikistan (U16). He made his tournament debut on 21 June 2015 in a match against his Spanish counterparts. Nurmatov participated in the qualifying round of the 2016 AFC U-16 Championship with the U16 national team of Tajikistan. The match against Qatar's 16-year-old national team on September 20, 2015, was the professional debut of his national team career.

Nurmatov participated in the "CAFA Cup - U-19" international tournament for the members of Central Asian Football Association in August 2016 with the Tajik U-19 football team.

In January 2017, Nurmatov played for the Tajik national youth team at the XXIX International Tournament in St. Petersburg in memory of FIFA First Vice-president Valentin Granatkin.

Nurmatov took part in "The 3rd Chang An Ford Cup International Youth Football Tournament 2017" with the Tajik national youth team (U-19) led by head coach Mubin Ergashev. Youth teams from Tajikistan, Mexico, Oman and China took part in the tournament, which will be held from September 20 to 24, 2017 in Qujing, China.

In October 2016, he was invited to the national team for the 2016 AFC U-19 Championship. In January 2017, he was invited to the national team of Tajikistan for 5 friendly matches with the U18 national team and made his debut in the match against the Greek U18 team. Tajikistan U19 lost in the quarterfinals. In October 2018, he was invited to the national team for the 2018 AFC U-19 Championship qualifiers. On October 4, 2018, Nurmatov made its debut in a match against the Sri Lanka national under-19 team. As the winner of Group B, they participated in the 2018 AFC U-19 Championship. He made his debut on October 20, 2018, in a match against the Chinese U-19 national team. He took part in 3 matches in the starting lineup of the tournament and in the quarterfinals with Tajikistan, the silver medalist lost to South Korea 1:0.

Nurmatov made his senior team debut on 13 December 2018 against Oman.

Nurmatov entered the field in the 80th minute. In March 2019, he was invited to the national team for the qualifying round of the 2020 AFC U-23 Championship. In the same year, Nurmatov was invited to the U-23 national team of Tajikistan for friendly matches against the national teams of Uzbekistan, Bahrain and Vietnam. In October 2021, Nurmatov was invited to the national team for the 2022 AFC U-23 Asian Cup qualification. He made his debut on 25 October 2021 against Lebanon's 23-year-old national team.

On November 26, 2021, Nurmatov was invited to play against the main national team of Tajikistan against Kazakhstan.

== Personal life ==
He is the first football player in Tajikistan to have an NFT.
