= Shokhrukh Kirgizboev =

Tajikistani footballer

Personal information
- Full name: Shokhrukh Kirgizboevich Kirgizboev
- Date of birth: 1 May 2002 (age 24)
- Place of birth: Gulxona, Sughd Region, Tajikistan
- Height: 1.82 m (6 ft 0 in)
- Position: Goalkeeper

Team information
- Current team: Khujand
- Number: 50

Senior career*
Years	Team	Apps	(Gls)
2018	Barkchi		
2019–2020	Lokomotiv-Pamir		
2021	Kuktosh Rudaki	10	(0)
2021–2023	Istiklol	9	(0)
2022	→ Khujand (loan)	18	(0)
2023–	Khujand	0	(0)

International career^{‡}
2018–	Tajikistan	6	(0)
- * Club domestic league appearances and goals as of 11:46, 22 March 2023 (UTC) ‡ National team caps and goals as of 11:38, 22 November 2021 (UTC)

Shokhrukh Kirgizboevich Kirgizboev (born 3 August 1987) is a Tajik professional football player who currently plays for Khujand.

== Career ==
=== Club ===
On 7 August 2021, Istiklol announced the signing of Kirgizboev. On 19 March 2022, Kirgizboev joined Khujand on loan for the season from Istiklol.

=== International ===
Kirgizboev made his senior team debut on 13 December 2018 against Oman, which ended as their 1–2 loss.

== Career statistics ==
=== Club ===
As of match played 27 November 2022

Club	Season	League			National Cup		Continental		Other		Total	
Club	Season	Division	Apps	Goals	Apps	Goals	Apps	Goals	Apps	Goals	Apps	Goals
Istiklol	2021	Tajikistan Higher League	9	0	3	0	0 (Note: Appearances in the AFC Champions League)	0	0 (Note: Appearances in the Tajik Supercup)	0	12	0
Istiklol	2022	Tajikistan Higher League	0	0	0	0	0	0	0	0	0	0
Istiklol	Total		9	0	3	0	0	0	0	0	12	0
Khujand (loan)	2022	Tajikistan Higher League	18	0	0	0	3 (Note: Appearances in the AFC Cup)	0	0	0	21	0
Career total			27	0	3	0	3	0	0	0	32	0

=== International ===
As of match played 16 November 2020

Appearances and goals by national team and year
National team	Year	Apps	Goals
Tajikistan	2018	2	0
Tajikistan	2019	1	0
Tajikistan	2020	3	0
Total		6	0

== Honours ==
Istiklol

- Tajikistan Higher League (1): 2021

Tajikistan

- King's Cup: 2022
