= 2021 Tajikistan Higher League =

Tajikistan Higher League
- Season: 2021
- Dates: 4 April – 5 December
- Champions: Istiklol
- AFC Champions League: Istiklol
- Matches: 135
- Goals: 368 (2.73 per match)
- Top goalscorer: Manuchekhr Dzhalilov (18)
- Biggest home win: Istiklol 7–1 Kuktosh
- Biggest away win: Dushanbe-83 0–8 Istiklol
- Highest scoring: Istiklol 7–1 Kuktosh; Dushanbe-83 0–8 Istiklol
- Longest winning run: Istiklol (11)
- Longest unbeaten run: Istiklol (19)
- Longest winless run: Kuktosh Rudaki (10)
- Longest losing run: Fayzkand (5)
- All statistics correct as of 5 December 2021.

The 2021 Ligai Olii Tojikiston (Tajik: 2021 Лигаи Олии Тоҷикистон, Russian: 2021 Высшая лига Таджикистана), or 2021 Tajikistan Higher League was the 30th season of Tajikistan Higher League, Tajikistan's top division of association football. The season began on 4 April 2021, and consist of twenty-seven rounds of matches.

== Season events ==
On 5 March, the Tajikistan Football Federation announced that the calendar of matches for the 2021 season will be drawn on 12 March.

== Teams ==
On 5 March 2021, the Tajikistan Football Federation announced that the season would involve ten teams, with there being 27 matches in three rounds. The teams consist of CSKA Pamir, Dushanbe-83, Fayzkand, Istiklol, Istaravshan, Khatlon, Khujand, Kuktosh and newly promoted Eskhata Khujand, and Ravshan Kulob.

Locations of teams in the 2021 Tajikistan Higher League

Team	Location	Venue	Capacity
CSKA Pamir	Dushanbe	CSKA Stadium	7,000
Dushanbe-83	Dushanbe		
Eskhata	Khujand	Bistsolagii Istiqloliyati Stadium	20,000
Fayzkand	Hulbuk	Markazii Kulob Stadium	
Istaravshan	Istaravshan	Istaravshan Sports Complex	20,000
Istiklol	Dushanbe	Markazii Tojikiston Stadium	24,000
Khatlon	Bokhtar	Markazii Bokhtar Stadium	10,000
Khujand	Khujand	Bistsolagii Istiqloliyati Stadium	20,000
Kuktosh	Chorgulteppa	Rudaki Stadium	
Ravshan	Kulob	Markazii Kulob Stadium	

=== Personnel and sponsoring ===
Team	Manager	Captain	Kit manufacturer	Sponsor
CSKA Pamir	(Tajikistan) Alier Ashurmamadov		Joma	1xBet
Dushanbe-83	(Tajikistan) Nazir Rizomov		Joma	
Eskhata	(Tajikistan) Khamid Karimov		Joma	Bank Eskhata
Fayzkand	(Tajikistan) Tokhirjon Muminov			
Istaravshan	(Tajikistan) Makhmadjon Khabibulloev			
Istiklol	(Tajikistan) Vitaliy Levchenko	(Tajikistan) Alisher Dzhalilov	Joma	Siyoma
Khatlon	(Tajikistan) Asliddin Khabibullaev		Joma	Formula 55
Khujand	(Tajikistan) Rustam Khojayev		Joma	Formula 55
Kuktosh	(Tajikistan) Hikmatullo Sharpiov			
Ravshan	(Tajikistan) Gairatali Mirakhmedov	(Tajikistan) Hasan Rustamov	Joma	Hoji Sharif

=== Foreign players ===
Each Tajikistan Higher League club is permitted to register a maximum of six foreign players, with four allowed on the pitch at the same time.

Club	Player 1	Player 2	Player 3	Player 4	Player 5	Player 6	Player 7	Former Players
CSKA Pamir	(Cameroon) Luc Mendjana	(Ghana) Idriss Aminu	(Ghana) Ocran Idan	(Ghana) Alex Peprah	(Turkmenistan) Rahat Japarow	(Uzbekistan) Orzubek Buriev		(Ghana) Felix Tette (Ukraine) Mykyta Shevtsov
Dushanbe-83	(Ghana) Collins Aduhene	(Ghana) Agbley Johns	(Ghana) Sodiq Musa	(Ghana) Nerrick Tettey	(Kyrgyzstan) **Daniel Tagoe**			(Cameroon) Luc Mendjana (Iran) Amir Memari Manesh (Moldova) Ion Arabadji (Moldova) Stanislav Ivanov
Eskhata	(Uzbekistan) Shahzod Abdurakhimov	(Uzbekistan) Akhror Inoyatov						(Uzbekistan) Akobir Turaev
Fayzkand	(Cameroon) Arthur Bougnone	(Cameroon) Joseph Feumba	(Cameroon) Junior Onana	(Iran) Arash Akbari	(Uzbekistan) Dilshodzhon Baratov	(Uzbekistan) Jasur Kurbonov	(Uzbekistan) Anvar Murodov	
Istaravshan	(Uzbekistan) Jafar Ismoilov	(Uzbekistan) Shakhzod Mamurzhonov	(Uzbekistan) Khurshid Olimov	(Uzbekistan) Jakhongir Safarov	(Uzbekistan) Shakhzod Shamsiddinov	(Uzbekistan) Akhrorbek Uktamov		
Istiklol	(Bulgaria) Petar Patev	(Japan) Ryota Noma	(Ukraine) Oleksiy Larin	(Ukraine) Andriy Mischenko				(Netherlands) Huseyin Dogan
Khatlon	(Cameroon) Tony Bikatal	(Cameroon) Jen Gaten	(Ghana) Asomini Ebenezer	(Ghana) Kuaye Godson				
Khujand	(Estonia) Aleksei Matrossov	(Russia) Artem Serdyuk	(Uzbekistan) Firdavs Abdusalimov	(Uzbekistan) Olim Karimov	(Uzbekistan) Samandar Ochilov			(Kazakhstan) Maksim Grek
Kuktosh	(Cameroon) Olivier Mbom	(Ivory Coast) Ya Saturnin-Hermann	(Uzbekistan) Alizhon Alizhonov	(Uzbekistan) Asadbek Islomov	(Uzbekistan) Sukhrob Rakhmonov	(Uzbekistan) Bunyod Shodiev	(Uzbekistan) Nodirbek Ibragimov	(Uzbekistan) Mukhiddin Odilov
Ravshan	(Ghana) Benjamin Asamoah	(Ghana) Kingsley Osei Effah	(Ghana) Obed Owusu	(Russia) Musa Ibragimov	(Uzbekistan) Mukhriddin Akhmedov			(Uzbekistan) Nodirbek Ibragimov (Uzbekistan) Anvar Murodov (Uzbekistan) Bunyod Shodiev

In bold: Players that have been capped for their national team.

=== Managerial changes ===
Team	Outgoing manager	Manner of departure	Date of vacancy	Position in table	Incoming manager	Date of appointment
CSKA Pamir	(Ukraine) Serhiy Zhytskyi			Pre-Season	(Tajikistan) Alier Ashurmamadov	
Istaravshan	(Tajikistan) Alier Ashurmamadov			Pre-Season	(Tajikistan) Makhmadjon Khabibulloev	
Khujand	(Tajikistan) Khakim Fuzailov			Pre-Season	(Tajikistan) Rustam Khojayev	
Kuktosh	(Tajikistan) Makhmadjon Khabibulloev			Pre-Season	(Tajikistan) Hikmatullo Sharpiov	

== League table ==
Pos	Team	Pld	W	D	L	GF	GA	GD	Pts	Qualification or relegation
1	Istiklol (C)	27	21	5	1	78	9	+69	68	Qualification for AFC Champions League group stage
2	Khujand	27	17	4	6	52	26	+26	55	Qualification for AFC Cup play off round
3	CSKA Pamir	27	12	8	7	37	29	+8	44	Qualification for AFC Cup play off round
4	Istaravshan	27	12	6	9	30	25	+5	42	
5	Khatlon	27	10	6	11	30	33	−3	36	
6	Eskhata	27	9	3	15	33	49	−16	30	
7	Ravshan	27	7	8	12	27	35	−8	29	
8	Fayzkand	27	8	5	14	20	37	−17	29	
9	Kuktosh (R)	27	7	5	15	38	58	−20	26	Relegation to Tajik First Division
10	Dushanbe-83 (R)	27	4	6	17	23	67	−44	18	Relegation to Tajik First Division

Source: FFT
Rules for classification: 1) Points; 2) Head-to-head points; 3) Head-to-head goal difference; 4) Head-to-head goals scored; 5) Goal difference; 6) Goals scored.
(C) Champions; (R) Relegated

== Fixtures and results ==
=== Rounds 1–18 ===
Home \ Away	CPD	D83	ESK	FAY	ISA	IST	KHA	KJD	KUK	RAV
CSKA Pamir		3–1	1–3	1–0	0–0	0–0	2–1	3–1	2–2	3–3
Dushanbe-83	0–0		1–2	1–1	1–1	0–5	1–0	2–1	2–1	4–2
Eskhata	1–2	3–1		1–0	2–3	0–2	1–1	3–2	3–1	1–1
Fayzkand	1–0	2–2	1–3		1–2	0–4	1–2	0–2	3–1	0–0
Istaravshan	2–1	2–0	2–0	0–0		2–1	1–2	2–3	2–2	1–0
Istiklol	1–0	5–0	5–1	4–0	2–0		2–0	4–1	7–1	3–0
Khatlon	1–1	2–0	1–0	0–1	0–0	0–6		1–1	2–0	0–1
Khujand	2–0	4–1	5–1	1–0	1–0	0–0	2–0		4–0	0–0
Kuktosh	3–1	2–2	2–1	0–2	1–0	1–1	3–3	1–3		1–2
Ravshan	1–2	1–1	0–0	0–0	2–1	1–1	1–2	1–0	2–0	

Source: Soccerway
Legend: Blue = home team win; Yellow = draw; Red = away team win.

=== Rounds 19–27 ===
Home \ Away	CPD	D83	ESK	FAY	ISA	IST	KHA	KJD	KUK	RAV
CSKA Pamir		4–0					0–0	1–0	2–0	
Dushanbe-83			1–2	0–1	0–2	0–8				
Eskhata	1–2			0–1	1–2	0–3				1–0
Fayzkand	1–3						2–1	0–1	1–0	
Istaravshan	0–0			1–0		0–1		1–2		1–0
Istiklol	3–1			5–0			1–0	0–0		2–0
Khatlon		3–1	2–1		0–1				3–0	2–1
Khujand		5–0	2–1				2–1		4–2	3–1
Kuktosh		3–1	5–0		2–1	1–2				
Ravshan	1–2	2–0		2–1					2–3	

Source: Soccerway
Legend: Blue = home team win; Yellow = draw; Red = away team win.

=== By match played ===
Team ╲ Round	1	2	3	4	5	6	7	8	9	10	11	12	13	14	15	16	17	18	19	20	21	22	23	24	25	26	27
CSKA Pamir	L	L	L	W	D	L	D	L	D	L	D	W	D	W	D	W	W	W	W	W	W	W	W	L	D	D	W
Dushanbe-83	L	L	W	L	W	D	D	D	L	L	D	L	W	D	D	L	L	W	L	L	L	L	L	L	L	L	L
Eskhata	D	W	D	L	L	W	L	W	W	W	L	L	W	L	W	D	L	L	L	W	L	L	L	L	L	L	W
Fayzkand	W	D	W	D	L	L	L	D	W	L	D	L	L	L	L	W	D	L	L	L	W	L	W	L	W	L	W
Istaravshan	W	L	W	D	W	L	D	L	D	W	D	W	L	W	W	L	D	L	W	L	L	W	W	L	W	D	W
Istiklol	D	W	L	W	W	W	W	W	D	W	D	W	D	W	W	W	W	W	W	W	W	D	W	W	W	W	W
Khatlon	D	D	L	L	D	W	W	W	L	W	D	D	L	L	L	W	L	W	W	L	W	L	L	W	D	W	L
Khujand	W	D	W	L	W	W	W	L	D	L	W	W	W	W	D	L	W	L	W	W	W	D	W	W	W	W	L
Kuktosh	D	W	L	W	L	D	L	W	L	L	D	D	L	L	L	L	D	L	L	W	L	W	L	W	L	W	L
Ravshan	L	D	D	W	L	L	D	L	W	W	D	L	W	D	D	D	D	W	L	L	L	W	L	W	L	L	L

W = Win; D = Draw; L = Loss

== Season statistics ==
=== Scoring ===
- First goal of the season: Makhmadali Sadykov for Fayzkand against CSKA Pamir. (4 April 2021)

=== Top scorers ===
As of end of season

Rank	Player	Club	Goals
1	(Tajikistan) Manuchekhr Dzhalilov	Istiklol	18
2	(Tajikistan) Rustam Soirov	Istiklol	15
3	(Tajikistan) Dilshod Bozorov	Khujand	13
3	(Tajikistan) Ilhomjon Barotov	Istaravshan	13
5	(Tajikistan) Alisher Dzhalilov	Istiklol	12
6	(Russia) Artyom Serdyuk	Khujand	11
7	(Tajikistan) Fatkhullo Fatkhuloev	CSKA Pamir Dushanbe	9
7	(Uzbekistan) Akobir Turaev	Eskhata	9
7	(Tajikistan) Abdukhalil Boronov	Fayzkand	9
7	(Tajikistan) Nuriddin Khamrokulov	Khatlon	9
7	(Uzbekistan) Amirjon Safarov	Kuktosh	9

=== Hat-tricks ===
Player	For	Against	Result	Date	Ref
(Tajikistan) Abdukhalil Boronov	Fayzkand	Kuktosh	3–1 (H)	16 April 2021	
(Russia) Artyom Serdyuk	Khujand	Istaravshan	2–3 (A)	6 May 2021	
(Tajikistan) Rustam Soirov	Istiklol	Eskhata	5–1 (H)	4 July 2021	
(Tajikistan) Fatkhullo Fatkhuloev^{4}	CSKA Pamir Dushanbe	Dushanbe-83	4–0 (H)	25 September 2021	
(Tajikistan) Manuchekhr Dzhalilov^{4}	Istiklol	Dushanbe-83	0–8 (A)	21 November 2021	
(Tajikistan) Rustam Soirov	Istiklol	Dushanbe-83	0–8 (A)	21 November 2021	

- ^{4} Player scored 4 goals

=== Clean sheets ===
As of matches played 4 July 2021.

Rank	Player	Club	Clean sheets
1	(Tajikistan) Azimjon Karaev	Fayzkand	4
1	(Tajikistan) Kurbonali Boboev	Istaravshan	4
1	(Estonia) Aleksei Matrossov	Khujand	4
4	(Tajikistan) Rustam Yatimov	Istiklol	3
4	(Tajikistan) Rustam Rizoev	Ravshan	3
6	(Ghana) Kuaye Godson	Khatlon	2
7	(Ghana) Alex Peprah	CSKA Pamir Dushanbe	1
7	(Tajikistan) Faromurz Saidov	Dushanbe-83	1
7	(Uzbekistan) Shakhzod Shamsiddinov	Istaravshan	1
7	(Tajikistan) Mukhriddin Khasanov	Istiklol	1
7	(Tajikistan) Shokhrukh Kirgizboev	Kuktosh	1

== Awards ==
=== Monthly awards ===
Month	Manager of the Month		Player of the Month		References
Month	Manager	Club	Player	Club	References
April	(Tajikistan) Azizbek Sultonov	Kuktosh	(Tajikistan) Tokhirjon Muminov	Fayzkand	
May	(Tajikistan) Tohirjon Tagoyzoda	Khatlon	(Tajikistan) Asliddin Khabibullaev	Khatlon	
