= 2020 Tajikistan Higher League =

Ligai Olii Tojikiston
- Season: 2020
- Dates: 5 April – 4 October
- Champions: Istiklol
- Relegated: Lokomotiv-Pamir; Regar-TadAZ
- AFC Champions League: Istiklol
- Matches: 90
- Goals: 278 (3.09 per match)
- Top goalscorer: Ilhomjon Barotov (18 goals)
- Biggest home win: Istiklol 8–0 Istaravshan (20 June 2020)
- Biggest away win: Regar-TadAZ 1–6 Istiklol (16 June 2020)
- Highest scoring: Istiklol 8–0 Istaravshan (20 June 2020)
- Longest winning run: 11 matches Istiklol
- Longest unbeaten run: 15 matches Istiklol
- Longest winless run: 6 matches Istaravshan
- Longest losing run: 6 matches Istaravshan
- All statistics correct as of 4 October 2020.

The 2020 Ligai Olii Tojikiston (Tajik: 2020 Лигаи Олии Тоҷикистон, Russian: 2020 Высшая Лига Таджикистана), or 2020 Tajikistan Higher League is the 29th season of Ligai Olii Tojikiston, Tajikistan's top division of association football. The season began on 5 April 2020.

== Season events ==
On 27 March, the Tajikistan Football Federation announced that the opening round of games would be played behind closed doors due to the threat of the COVID-19 pandemic.

On 25 April, the Tajikistan Football Federation announced the suspension of football, following the completion of Round 4 on 26 April, until 10 May.

On 6 May, the Tajikistan Football Federation extended the suspension of football indefinitely due to the spread of COVID-19 pandemic in Tajikistan.

On 8 June, the Tajikistan Football Federation announced that the season would resume on 16 June, with the games continuing to be played without spectators.

== Teams ==
On 20 March 2020, the Tajikistan Football Federation announced that the season would involve ten teams, with there being 27 matches in three rounds. The teams consist of CSKA Pamir, Istiklol, Istaravshan, Khatlon, Khujand, Kuktosh, Regar-TadAZ and newly promoted Dushanbe-83, Fayzkand and Lokomotiv-Pamir.

Locations of teams in the 2020 Tajikistan Higher League

Team	Location	Venue	Capacity
CSKA Pamir	Dushanbe	CSKA Stadium	7,000
Dushanbe-83	Dushanbe		
Fayzkand	Hulbuk	Markazii Kulob Stadium	
Istaravshan	Istaravshan	Istaravshan Sports Complex	20,000
Istiklol	Dushanbe	Markazii Tojikiston Stadium	24,000
Khatlon	Bokhtar	Markazii Bokhtar Stadium	10,000
Khujand	Khujand	Bistsolagii Istiqloliyati Stadium	20,000
Kuktosh Rudaki	Rudaki District	Rudaki Stadium	
Lokomotiv-Pamir	Dushanbe	Lokomotiv Stadium	
Regar-TadAZ	Tursunzoda	TALCO Arena	20,000

=== Personnel and sponsoring ===
Team	Manager	Captain	Kit manufacturer	Sponsor
CSKA Pamir Dushanbe	(Ukraine) Serhiy Zhytskyi	(Ukraine) Artem Haydash	Joma	1Xbet
Dushanbe-83	(Tajikistan) Nazirsho Rizomov		Adidas	-
Fayzkand	(Tajikistan) Tokhirjon Muminov	(Tajikistan) Mahmadali Sadikov	Adidas	-
Istaravshan	(Tajikistan) Alier Ashurmamadov		Joma	
Istiklol	(Tajikistan) Vitaliy Levchenko	(Tajikistan) Alisher Dzhalilov	Joma	Siyoma
Khatlon	(Tajikistan) Asliddin Khabibullaev	(Tajikistan) Umarjon Sharipov	Joma	
Khujand	(Tajikistan) Khakim Fuzailov	(Tajikistan) Komroni Mirzonazhod	Joma	Samsung HD TV
Kuktosh Rudaki	(Tajikistan) Makhmadjon Khabibulloev		Joma	
Lokomotiv-Pamir	(Tajikistan) Mubin Ergashev	(Tajikistan) Emomali Ahmadhon	Joma	Parimatch
Regar-TadAZ	(Tajikistan) Uktam Sattorov		Joma	TALCO

=== Foreign players ===
Each Tajikistan Higher League club is permitted to register six foreign players, with four allowed on the pitch at the same time.

Club	Player 1	Player 2	Player 3	Player 4	Player 5	Player 6	Former Players
CSKA Pamir Dushanbe	(Ukraine) Dmytro Bondar	(Ukraine) Artem Gaydash	(Ukraine) Ivan Ponomarenko	(Uzbekistan) Nodirbek Ibragimov			
Dushanbe-83	(Cameroon) Yavis Noah Parfat	(Ghana) Colins Adukhen	(Ghana) Idris Aminu	(Ghana) Agbley Jones	(Ghana) Emmanuel Kudiabor	(Ivory Coast) Azian Joseph Adolph	(Ghana) Sadiq Musa (Ghana) Silvanus Evans (Kyrgyzstan) **Elijah Ari**
Fayzkand	(Cameroon) Joseph Feumba	(Uzbekistan) Dilshodzhon Baratov	(Uzbekistan) Abbos Ikromov	(Uzbekistan) Jasur Kurbonov	(Uzbekistan) Anvar Murodov	(Uzbekistan) Azizdzhon Zaripov	(Uzbekistan) Jasur Ashurov
Istaravshan	(Uzbekistan) Zufardjon Akbaraliev	(Uzbekistan) Saiddoston Fozilov	(Uzbekistan) Shakhzod Shamsiddinov	(Uzbekistan) Tulkinjon Umarov			(Cameroon) Joseph Feumba (Cameroon) Mbeke Siebatcheu
Istiklol	(Russia) Viktor Svezhov	(Serbia) Marko Milić	(Turkmenistan) **Wahyt Orazsähedow**	(Ukraine) Oleksiy Larin			
Khatlon	(Cameroon) Tony Bikatal	(Cameroon) Jen Gaten	(Cameroon) Alassa Mfuapon	(Ghana) Quaye Godson			
Khujand	(Uzbekistan) Mamur Ikramov	(Uzbekistan) Siroj Khamrayev	(Uzbekistan) Sanjar Rixsiboev	(Uzbekistan) Amirjon Safarov			(Uzbekistan) **Andrey Sidorov**
Kuktosh Rudaki	(Ghana) Prince Arthur	(Ghana) Benjamin Asamoa	(Ghana) Ishmael Klotey	(Uzbekistan) Muhiddin Odilov	(Uzbekistan) Bunyod Shodiev	(Cameroon) Mbeke Siebatcheu	(Iran) Erfan Moradnezhadi (Uzbekistan) Abbos Ikromov
Lokomotiv-Pamir	(Iran) Radin Sayyar						(Ghana) Benjamin Asamoa (Ghana) Avuku Kaleb Oduro
Regar-TadAZ	(Iran) Arash Akbari						(Uzbekistan) Sardorbek Eminov (Uzbekistan) Jalil Kimsanov (Uzbekistan) **Farrukh Nurliboev**

In bold: Players that have been capped for their national team.

=== Managerial changes ===
Team	Outgoing manager	Manner of departure	Date of vacancy	Position in table	Incoming manager	Date of appointment
Khujand	(Tajikistan) Vitaliy Levchenko	End of Contract		Pre-Season	(Serbia) Nikola Lazarevic	21 December 2019
Istiklol	(Tajikistan) Alisher Tukhtaev (Caretaker)	End of Contract	31 December 2019	Pre-Season	(Tajikistan) Mubin Ergashev	
Istiklol	(Tajikistan) Mubin Ergashev	End of Contract	17 February 2020	Pre-Season	(Tajikistan) Vitaliy Levchenko	17 February 2020
Fayzkand				Pre-Season	(Tajikistan) Tokhirjon Muminov	24 March 2020
Kuktosh Rudaki	(Tajikistan) Rahmatullo Fuzailov	Resigned	7 July 2020	7th	(Tajikistan) Makhmadjon Khabibulloev	7 July 2020
Khujand	(Serbia) Nikola Lazarevic		12 July 2020	2nd	(Tajikistan) Khakim Fuzailov	12 July 2020

== League table ==
Pos	Team	Pld	W	D	L	GF	GA	GD	Pts	Qualification or relegation
1	Istiklol (C)	18	14	3	1	61	11	+50	45	Qualification for AFC Champions League group stage
2	Khujand	18	11	2	5	30	23	+7	35	Qualification for AFC Cup group stage
3	CSKA Pamir	18	8	5	5	29	25	+4	29	
4	Kuktosh	18	7	7	4	30	24	+6	28	
5	Khatlon	18	6	8	4	27	24	+3	26	
6	Dushanbe-83	18	5	5	8	20	29	−9	20	
7	Fayzkand	18	4	7	7	17	31	−14	19	
8	Istaravshan	18	4	5	9	29	38	−9	17	
9	Lokomotiv-Pamir (R)	18	3	5	10	14	26	−12	14	Relegation to Tajik First Division
10	Regar-TadAZ (R)	18	3	3	12	21	47	−26	12	Relegation to Tajik First Division

Updated to match(es) played on 4 October 2020. Source: FFT
Rules for classification: 1) Points; 2) Head-to-head points; 3) Head-to-head goal difference; 4) Head-to-head goals scored; 5) Goal difference; 6) Goals scored.
(C) Champions; (R) Relegated

== Fixtures and results ==
=== Rounds 1–18 ===
Home \ Away	CPD	D83	FAY	ISA	IST	KHA	KJD	KUK	LOK	RZD
CSKA Pamir	—	3–1	1–1	1–1	1–0	2–1	1–3	1–5	3–1	3–1
Dushanbe-83	2–1	—	0–0	3–3	1–2	1–1	1–2	2–1	1–0	3–0
Fayzkand	1–1	1–1	—	2–1	0–4	2–1	0–3	0–0	1–0	3–2
Istaravshan	1–2	2–0	5–2	—	1–2	1–1	1–2	0–3	2–0	4–0
Istiklol	2–0	7–0	3–0	8–0	—	2–2	4–0	6–1	1–0	6–1
Khatlon	0–0	1–0	1–1	2–1	1–1	—	2–3	2–1	0–0	4–2
Khujand	1–2	1–0	2–0	2–1	1–3	2–3	—	1–2	0–0	2–1
Kuktosh	0–0	2–2	3–1	2–2	1–1	2–1	1–1	—	1–0	0–0
Lokomotiv-Pamir	3–2	1–0	2–2	2–2	0–3	2–3	0–2	2–1	—	1–2
Regar-TadAZ	1–5	1–2	1–0	4–1	1–6	1–1	1–2	2–4	0–0	—

Updated to match(es) played on 4 October 2020. Source: Soccerway
Legend: Blue = home team win; Yellow = draw; Red = away team win.

== Season statistics ==
=== Scoring ===
- First goal of the season: Ilhomjon Barotov for Istaravshan against Khatlon (5 April 2020)

=== Top scorers ===
As of match played 4 October 2020

Rank	Player	Club	Goals
1	(Tajikistan) Ilhomjon Barotov	Istaravshan	18
2	(Tajikistan) Manuchekhr Dzhalilov	Istiklol	16
3	(Tajikistan) Alisher Dzhalilov	Istiklol	12
4	(Tajikistan) Sheriddin Boboev	Istiklol	10
5	(Tajikistan) Rustam Soirov	Istiklol	8
5	(Tajikistan) Dilshod Bozorov	Khujand	8
7	(Tajikistan) Shodibek Gafforov	CSKA Pamir Dushanbe	7
7	(Tajikistan) Shervoni Mabatshoev	CSKA Pamir Dushanbe	7
7	(Tajikistan) Parviz Baki-Akhunov	Khatlon	7
10	(Tajikistan) Elchibek Rashidbekov	Dushanbe-83	6

=== Hat-tricks ===
Player	For	Against	Result	Date	Ref
(Tajikistan) Manuchekhr Dzhalilov	Istiklol	Dushanbe-83	7-0 (A)	8 April 2020	
(Tajikistan) Rustam Soirov	Istiklol	Kuktosh	6-1 (H)	25 April 2020	
(Tajikistan) Khudoidod Uzokov	Khatlon	Lokomotiv-Pamir	3-2 (A)	26 April 2020	
(Tajikistan) Sheriddin Boboev^{4}	Istiklol	Regar-TadAZ	6-1 (H)	8 September 2020	
(Tajikistan) Ilhomjon Barotov^{5}	Istaravshan	Fayzkand	5-2 (H)	29 September 2020	

- ^{4} Player scored 4 goals
- ^{5} Player scored 5 goals
