= Rustam Soirov =

Tajikistani footballer

Personal information
- Full name: Rustam Jamshidovich Soirov
- Date of birth: 12 September 2002 (age 24)
- Place of birth: Dushanbe, Tajikistan
- Height: 1.74 m (5 ft 9 in)
- Position: Forward

Team information
- Current team: Istiklol
- Number: 9

Youth career
- Lokomotiv-Pamir

Senior career*
Years	Team	Apps	(Gls)
2020–2022	Istiklol	46	(26)
2022	Levadia Tallinn	5	(0)
2022	→ Levadia II	6	(3)
2023	Lokomotiv Tashkent	17	(8)
2024–	Istiklol	32	(13)

International career^{‡}
2019	Tajikistan U17	3	(1)
2020–	Tajikistan	32	(5)
- * Club domestic league appearances and goals as of 10:08, 9 March 2026 (UTC) ‡ National team caps and goals as of 11:48, 21 September 2026 (UTC)

Rustam Jamshidovich Soirov (Tajik: Рустам Ҷамшедович Соиров; Russian: ‌Рустам Джамшидович Соиров; born 12 September 2002) is a Tajikistani professional football player who currently plays for Istiklol in the Tajikistan Higher League.

== Club career ==
=== Istiklol ===
In 2020, Soirov joined Istiklol.

=== Levadia Tallinn ===
On 2 August 2022, Istiklol announced that Soirov had left the club to join Levadia Tallinn on a three-year contract.

=== Lokomotiv Tashkent ===
On 23 December 2022, Uzbekistan club, Lokomotiv Tashkent announced the signing of Soirov to a two-year contract.

=== Istiklol return ===
On 16 March 2024, Istiklol announced the return of Soirov on a contract until the end of 2025. On 14 January 2026, Istiklol announced that they had extended their contract with Soirov until the end of the 2027 season.

== International career ==
Soirov made his senior team debut on 7 November 2020 against Bahrain.

He scored his first international goal against Malaysia on 17 October 2023 in the final match of the 2023 Merdeka Tournament.

== Career statistics ==
=== Club ===
As of match played 7 March 2026

Club	Season	League			National Cup		Continental		Other		Total	
Club	Season	Division	Apps	Goals	Apps	Goals	Apps	Goals	Apps	Goals	Apps	Goals
Istiklol	2020	Tajikistan Higher League	16	8	2	2	1 (Note: Zero appearances in the AFC Champions League, one appearance in the AFC Cup)	0	1 (Note: Appearances and goals in the Tajik Supercup)	0	20	10
Istiklol	2021	Tajikistan Higher League	24	15	5	1	7 (Note: Appearances in the AFC Champions League)	1	1	0	37	17
Istiklol	2022	Tajikistan Higher League	6	3	0	0	6	0	1	1	13	4
Istiklol	Total		46	26	7	3	14	1	3	1	70	31
Levadia Tallinn	2022	Meistriliiga	5	0	0	0	-		-		5	0
Levadia II	2022	Esiliiga	6	3	-		-		-		6	3
Lokomotiv Tashkent	2023	Uzbekistan Pro League	17	8	4	3	-		-		21	11
Istiklol	2024	Tajikistan Higher League	14	3	3	1	6 (Note: Appearances in the AFC Champions League Two)	0	1	1	24	5
Istiklol	2025	Tajikistan Higher League	17	10	2	0	6	1	1	0	26	11
Istiklol	2026	Tajikistan Higher League	1	0	0	0	0 (Note: Appearances in the AFC Challenge League)	0	0	0	1	0
Istiklol	Total		32	13	5	1	12	1	2	1	51	16
Career total			106	50	16	7	26	2	5	2	153	61

=== International ===
Tajikistan national team
Year	Apps	Goals
2020	1	0
2021	5	0
2022	3	0
2023	3	2
2024	12	3
2025	7	0
2026	1	0
Total	32	5

Statistics accurate as of match played 31 March 2026

=== International goals ===
Scores and results list Tajikistan's goal tally first.

No.	Date	Venue	Opponent	Score	Result	Competition
1.	17 October 2023	Bukit Jalil National Stadium, Kuala Lumpur, Malaysia	Malaysia	2–0	2–0	Merdeka Tournament
2.	21 November 2023	Jinnah Sports Stadium, Islamabad, Pakistan	Pakistan	2–0	6–1	2026 FIFA World Cup qualification
3.	4 January 2024	Zayed Cricket Training Centre, Abu Dhabi, United Arab Emirates	Hong Kong	1–0	2–1	Friendly
4.	26 March 2024	Pamir Stadium, Dushanbe, Tajikistan	Saudi Arabia	1–1	1–1	2026 FIFA World Cup qualification
5.	19 November 2024	Pamir Stadium, Dushanbe, Tajikistan	Afghanistan	3–1	3–1	Friendly

== Honours ==
=== Club ===
Istiklol

- Tajik League: 2020, 2021
- Tajik Supercup: 2020, 2021, 2022, 2024

=== International ===
Tajikistan

- King's Cup: 2022
- Merdeka Tournament: 2023
