= Vahdat Hanonov =

Tajik footballer (born 2000)

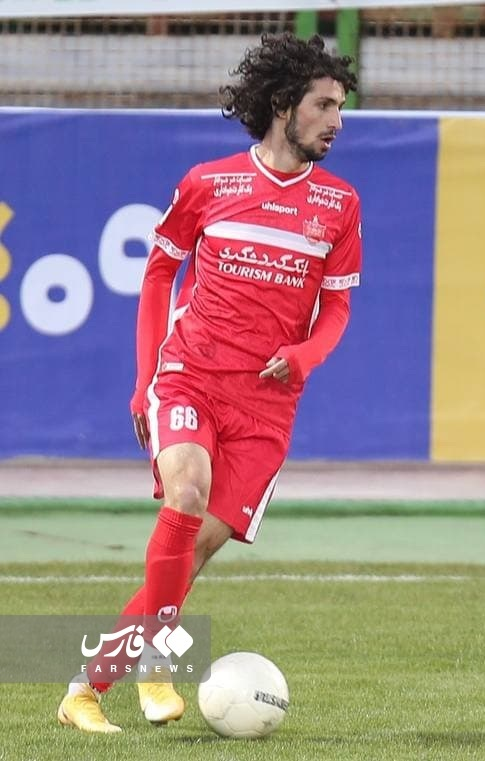
- Hanonov with Persepolis in 2022

Personal information
- Full name: Vahdat Azamatovich Hanonov
- Date of birth: 25 July 2000 (age 26)
- Place of birth: Hisor, Tajikistan
- Height: 1.83 m (6 ft 0 in)
- Position: Centre-back

Team information
- Current team: Istiklol
- Number: 66

Senior career*
Years	Team	Apps	(Gls)
2017–2018	Barkchi Hisor		
2019	Pamir Dushanbe	15	(1)
2020–2021	Istiklol	31	(5)
2021–2024	Persepolis	29	(1)
2024–2026	Sepahan	21	(0)
2026–	Istiklol	0	(0)

International career^{‡}
2015	Tajikistan U16	2	(1)
2016–2018	Tajikistan U19	12	(0)
2017–2021	Tajikistan U23	6	(2)
2018–	Tajikistan	46	(6)
- * Club domestic league appearances and goals as of 5 December 2025 ‡ National team caps and goals as of 6 October 2026

Vahdat Azamatovich Hanonov (Tajik: Ваҳдат Ҳаннонов, Russian: Вахдат Азаматович Ханонов; born 25 July 2000) is a Tajik professional footballer who plays as a centre-back for Tajikistan Higher League club Istiklol and the Tajikistan national team.

== Club career ==
=== Pamir Dushanbe ===
Hanonov scored for Pamir Dushanbe in their 4–1 defeat to Istiklol on 9 May 2019.

=== Persepolis ===
On 7 November 2021, Hanonov left Istiklol with Manuchehr Safarov to sign for Iranian club Persepolis, on a contract until 30 June 2024. On 17 January 2022, Hanonov made his debut in a 3–0 away win against Zob Ahan Esfahan.

=== Sepahan ===
In July 2024, Hanonov signed a two-year contract with fellow Persian Gulf Pro League club Sepahan.

=== Istiklol ===
On 30 July 2026, Istiklol announced the return of Hanonov to the club.

== International career ==
Hanonov made his senior team debut for Tajikistan on 16 December 2018 against Oman. He scored his first international goal during the 2023 CAFA Nations Cup against Oman on 14 June 2023.

During the 2023 AFC Asian Cup Round of 16 fixtures against UAE on 28 January 2024, Hanonov scored the goal in the match which also see Tajikistan advancing to their first quarter-final in their history.

== Career statistics ==
=== Club ===
As of match played 21 December 2025

Appearances and goals by club, season and competition
Club	Season	League			National cup (Note: Includes Tajikistan Cup, Hazfi Cup)		Continental		Other		Total	
Club	Season	Division	Apps	Goals	Apps	Goals	Apps	Goals	Apps	Goals	Apps	Goals
Istiklol	2020	Tajik League	11	0	2	1	0 (Note: Zero Appearances in the AFC Champions League and AFC Cup)	0	0 (Note: Appearances in the Tajik Supercup)	0	13	1
Istiklol	2021	Tajik League	20	5	3	1	7 (Note: Appearances and goals in the AFC Champions League)	1	1	0	31	7
Istiklol	Total		31	5	5	2	7	1	1	0	44	8
Persepolis	2021–22	Persian Gulf Pro League	8	0	2	0	0	0	1 (Note: Appearances in the Iranian Super Cup)	0	11	0
Persepolis	2022–23	Persian Gulf Pro League	10	1	5	0	0	0	0	0	15	1
Persepolis	2023–24	Persian Gulf Pro League	11	0	1	0	4	0	0	0	16	0
Persepolis	Total		29	1	8	0	4	0	1	0	42	1
Sepahan	2024–25	Persian Gulf Pro League	17	0	1	0	5	1	1	0	24	1
Sepahan	2025–26	Persian Gulf Pro League	4	0	1	0	1	0	—		6	0
Sepahan	Total		21	0	2	0	6	1	1	0	30	1
Career total			81	6	15	2	17	2	3	0	116	10

=== International ===
As of match played 6 October 2026

Appearances and goals by national team and year
National team	Year	Apps	Goals
Tajikistan	2018	2	0
Tajikistan	2020	1	0
Tajikistan	2021	7	0
Tajikistan	2022	8	0
Tajikistan	2023	7	2
Tajikistan	2024	12	2
Tajikistan	2025	5	1
Tajikistan	2026	5	1
Total		46	6

Scores and results list Tajikistan's goal tally first.

No.	Date	Venue	Opponent	Score	Result	Competition
1.	14 June 2023	Pakhtakor Central Stadium, Tashkent, Uzbekistan	Oman	1–1	1–1	2023 CAFA Nations Cup
2.	8 September 2023	Bishan Stadium, Bishan, Singapore	Singapore	2–0	2–0	Friendly
3.	28 January 2024	Ahmad bin Ali Stadium, Al Rayyan, Qatar	United Arab Emirates	1–0	1–1 (5–3 p)	2023 AFC Asian Cup
4.	11 June 2024	Pamir Stadium, Dushanbe, Tajikistan	Pakistan	3–0	3–0	2026 FIFA World Cup qualification
5.	25 March 2025	Pamir Stadium, Dushanbe, Tajikistan	Timor-Leste	1–0	1–0	2027 AFC Asian Cup qualification
6.	6 October 2026	Longxing Football Stadium, Chongqing, China	China	1–0	1–0	Friendly

== Honours ==
Istiklol

- Tajikistan Higher League: 2020
- Tajik Supercup: 2021

Persepolis

- Persian Gulf Pro League: (2) 2022–23, 2023–24 runner-up: 2021–22
- Hazfi Cup: 2022–23
- Iranian Super Cup: 2023 runner-up: 2021

Sepahan

- Iranian Super Cup: 2024

Tajikistan

- King's Cup: 2022
- Merdeka Tournament: 2023

Individual

- AFC Asian Cup Team of the Tournament: 2023
