= Petar Patev =

Bulgarian footballer

Personal information
- Full name: Petar Mladenov Patev
- Date of birth: 21 May 1993 (age 33)
- Place of birth: Burgas, Bulgaria
- Height: 1.83 m (6 ft 0 in)
- Position: Centre back

Team information
- Current team: Yambol
- Number: 22

Senior career*
| Years | Team | Apps | (Gls) |
| 2011–2012 | Pomorie | 11 | (0) |
| 2012–2013 | Neftochimic 1986 | 25 | (0) |
| 2014 | Spartak Varna | 12 | (2) |
| 2014–2015 | PFC Burgas | 23 | (2) |
| 2015–2019 | Dunav Ruse | 107 | (4) |
| 2019–2021 | Slavia Sofia | 30 | (0) |
| 2021–2022 | Istiklol | 9 | (1) |
| 2022 | Spartak Varna | 10 | (0) |
| 2022–2024 | Chernomorets 1919 | 50 | (3) |
| 2024– | Yambol | 77 | (5) |
- * Club domestic league appearances and goals as of 08:42, 16 December 2024 (UTC)

Petar Patev (Bulgarian Cyrillic: Петър Патев; born 21 May 1993) is a Bulgarian professional footballer who plays as a defender for Yambol.

== Career ==
On 22 August 2021, Patev signed for Istiklol on a contract until the end of the 2021 season.

== Career statistics ==
=== Club ===
As of match played 21 May 2022

| Club | Season | League | | | National Cup | | Continental | | Other | | Total | |
| Club | Season | Division | Apps | Goals | Apps | Goals | Apps | Goals | Apps | Goals | Apps | Goals |
|---|---|---|---|---|---|---|---|---|---|---|---|---|
| Pomorie | 2011–12 | B Group | 11 | 0 | 0 | 0 | - | | - | | 11 | 0 |
| Neftochimic Burgas | 2012–13 | B Group | 13 | 0 | 1 | 0 | - | | - | | 14 | 0 |
| Neftochimic Burgas | 2013–14 | A Group | 12 | 0 | 2 | 0 | - | | - | | 14 | 0 |
| Neftochimic Burgas | Total | | 25 | 0 | 3 | 0 | - | - | - | - | 28 | 0 |
| Spartak Varna | 2013–14 | B Group | 12 | 2 | 0 | 0 | - | | - | | 12 | 2 |
| Burgas | 2014–15 | B Group | 23 | 2 | 1 | 0 | - | | - | | 24 | 2 |
| Dunav Ruse | 2015–16 | B Group | 21 | 3 | 1 | 0 | - | | - | | 22 | 3 |
| Dunav Ruse | 2016–17 | Bulgarian First League | 31 | 1 | 2 | 0 | - | | - | | 33 | 1 |
| Dunav Ruse | 2017–18 | Bulgarian First League | 28 | 0 | 3 | 0 | 2 (Note: Appearances in the UEFA Europa League) | 0 | 4 (Note: Relegation Playoff) | 0 | 37 | 0 |
| Dunav Ruse | 2018–19 | Bulgarian First League | 27 | 0 | 1 | 0 | - | | 1 | 0 | 29 | 0 |
| Dunav Ruse | Total | | 107 | 4 | 7 | 0 | 2 | 0 | 5 | 0 | 121 | 4 |
| Slavia Sofia | 2019–20 | Bulgarian First League | 19 | 0 | 1 | 0 | - | | - | | 20 | 0 |
| Slavia Sofia | 2020–21 | Bulgarian First League | 11 | 0 | 3 | 0 | 1 | 0 | - | | 15 | 0 |
| Slavia Sofia | Total | | 30 | 0 | 4 | 0 | 1 | 0 | - | - | 35 | 0 |
| Istiklol | 2021 | Tajik League | 9 | 1 | 1 | 0 | 0 (Note: Appearances in the AFC Champions League) | 0 | 0 (Note: Appearances in the Tajik Supercup) | 0 | 10 | 1 |
| Spartak Varna | 2021–22 | Bulgarian First League | 10 | 0 | 0 | 0 | - | | - | | 10 | 0 |
| Career total | | | 227 | 9 | 16 | 0 | 3 | 0 | 5 | 0 | 251 | 9 |

== Honours ==
Istiklol

- Tajikistan Higher League (1): 2021
