= FK Istaravshan =

Association football club in Tajikistan

Istaravshan
- Full name: Football Club Istaravshan
- Nicknames: Istaravshanians, Northern tigers
- Founded: 1938; 88 years ago
- Ground: Istaravshan-Arena
- Capacity: 20,000
- Chairman: Asror Shorajabov
- Manager: Yahyo Azizboev
- League: Tajikistan Higher League
- 2025: Tajikistan Higher League, 10th
- Website: fc-istaravshan.ucoz.com
Home colours	Away colours

FC Istaravshan (Tajik: Клуби футболи Строшан) is a Tajik professional football club based in Istaravshan, that competes in the Tajikistan Higher League. The club was folded in 2013, but has since reformed.

== History ==
In 2004, under the name "Uroteppa", they finished as runners-up to Aviator Bobojon Ghafurov in the Tajik Cup, whilst finishing 6th in the Tajik League. In 2012, the club's stadium underwent a $3 million renovation, upgrading its capacity to 20,000 seats. The Istaravshan Sports Complex was officially re-opened on 27 October by Emomalii Rahmon, president of Tajikistan. At the end of the 2013 season, Istaravshan ceased to exist due to financial problems, being replaced by FK Daleron-Uroteppa, after a failed merger between the two clubs. On 14 March 2019, Tokhirjon Muminov was appointed as manager of Istaravshan.

=== Names ===
- 1938–1980: Spartak
- 1981–1991: Trikotazhnik
- 1992–1995: Istaravshan
- 1999: Istaravshan
- 2004: Uroteppa
- 2009–: Istaravshan

== Domestic history ==
Season	League									Tajik Cup	Top goalscorer		Manager
Season	Div.	Pos.	Pl.	W	D	L	GS	GA	P	Tajik Cup	Name	League	Manager
1992	1st	6th	20	10	3	7	27	35	23				
1993	1st	4th	30	16	4	10	60	44	36				
1994	1st	8th	30	11	8	11	50	46	30				
1995	1st	2nd	28	18	3	7	60	29	57				
1999	1st	10th	22	3	3	16	11	42	12				
2003	1st	7th	30	16	6	8	69	31	54				
2004	1st	6th	36	11	8	17	52	65	41	Runner-Up	(Tajikistan) Shuhrat Shamsiyev	23	
2012	1st	9th	24	8	4	12	33	44	28				
2013	1st	10th	18	2	2	14	13	42	8				
2019	1st	5th	21	8	3	10	24	32	27	Round of 16	(Tajikistan) Bakhtovar Zokirov	7	(Tajikistan) Tokhirjon Muminov
2020	1st	8th	18	4	5	9	29	38	17	Semifinal	(Tajikistan) Ilhomjon Barotov	18	(Tajikistan) Alier Ashurmamadov
2021	1st	4th	27	12	6	9	30	25	42	Quarterfinal	(Tajikistan) Ilhomjon Barotov	13	(Tajikistan) Makhmadjon Khabibulloev
2022	1st	9th	22	7	4	11	26	27	25	Round of 16	(Tajikistan) Amirjon Safarov	6	(Uzbekistan) Numon Khasanov
2023	2nd	2nd	22	15	4	3	69	19	49				

== Current squad ==
As of 9 March 2026

Note: Flags indicate national team as defined under FIFA eligibility rules; some limited exceptions apply. Players may hold more than one non-FIFA nationality.

No.	Pos.	Nation	Player
1	GK	TJK	Dilshod Dodoboev
2	DF	TJK	Asadbek Ziyozoda
4	DF	TJK	Khaidar Sattorov
5	MF	TJK	Shakhzod Inoyatov
7	FW	TJK	Sultonbek Fozilov
8	MF	TJK	Shakhbon Naimov
9	MF	UZB	Jahongir Safarov
11	MF	UZB	Tulkin Ergashev
14	DF	UZB	Abdujalil Manazarov
15	DF	TJK	Amiri Farhod
17	MF	TJK	Iskandar Oripov

No.	Pos.	Nation	Player
18	MF	TJK	Abdukakhor Kodirov
19	FW	TJK	Abdulfattokh Khudoydodzoda
20	DF	UZB	Amirbek Fayziev
21	MF	UZB	Maradona Safarov
22	DF	TJK	Faridun Dekhkonov
27	MF	UZB	Bobur Kosimov
67	DF	UZB	Zoyirjon Tursunov
77	MF	TJK	Saidsho Bozorov
91	GK	TJK	Bekhzod Khakimov
97	FW	TJK	Muhammadikboli Aminzoda
99	FW	TJK	Shavkati Khotam
