= Muhsindzhon Abdugaffor =

Tajikistani professional football player

Personal information
- Date of birth: 9 April 1997 (age 29)
- Place of birth: Vahdat, Tajikistan
- Height: 1.75 m (5 ft 9 in)
- Position: Midfielder

Team information
- Current team: CSKA Pamir Dushanbe

Senior career*
Years	Team	Apps	(Gls)
2018–	CSKA Pamir Dushanbe		

International career^{‡}
2018–	Tajikistan	3	(0)
- * Club domestic league appearances and goals as of 09:30, 19 December 2018 (UTC) ‡ National team caps and goals as of 09:30, 19 December 2018 (UTC)

Muhsindzhon Abdugaffor (born 9 April 1997) is a Tajikistani professional football player who currently plays for CSKA Pamir Dushanbe.

== Career ==
=== International ===
Abdugaffor made his senior team debut on 2 October 2018 against Nepal.

== Career statistics ==
=== International ===
Tajikistan national team
Year	Apps	Goals
2018	3	0
Total	3	0

Statistics accurate as of match played 16 December 2018
