= Ryota Noma =

Japanese footballer (born 1991)

Personal information
- Date of birth: 15 November 1991 (age 34)
- Place of birth: Funabashi, Japan
- Height: 1.79 m (5 ft 10 in)
- Position: Attacking midfielder

Youth career
- 2008–2010: Aomori Yamada High School
- 2010–2013: Meiji University

Senior career*
Years	Team	Apps	(Gls)
2014–2017	Rudar Pljevlja	61	(7)
2017–2019	Radnički Niš	79	(9)
2020–2021	SKA-Khabarovsk	5	(0)
2021	Istiklol	19	(4)
2022–2023	Barito Putera	7	(1)
- * Club domestic league appearances and goals as of 27 February 2023

Ryota Noma (野間 涼太, Noma Ryōta; born 15 November 1991) is a Japanese professional footballer who plays as an attacking midfielder.

== Career ==
Born in Funabashi, Chiba, Noma played in Japan with Aomori Yamada High School from 2008 to 2010, and with the Meiji University team between 2010 and 2013. In 2014, he moved to Europe and signed with Montenegrin First League side Rudar Pljevlja. He remained in Pljevlja for three years, winning the 2014–15 and the 2016, and playing with Rudar in the 2016–17 UEFA Europa League.

During the winter break of the 2016–17 season, he was acquired by Serbian club Radnički Niš.

In March 2021, Noma joined Istiklol on trial and signed a one-year contract with the club on 29 March 2021. Noma scored his first goal for Istiklol on 21 June 2021 in a 4–1 victory over Khujand, which was also Istiklol's 800th Tajikistan Higher League goal.

== Career statistics ==
As of match played 27 February 2023

Club	Season	League			National Cup		Continental		Other		Total	
Club	Season	Division	Apps	Goals	Apps	Goals	Apps	Goals	Apps	Goals	Apps	Goals
Rudar Pljevlja	2013–14	Montenegrin First League	10	1	0	0	0 (Note: Appearances in the UEFA Europa League)	0	—		15	2
Rudar Pljevlja	2014–15	Montenegrin First League	22	3	0	0	—		—		27	3
Rudar Pljevlja	2015–16	Montenegrin First League	15	1	3	0	0 (Note: Appearances in the UEFA Champions League)	0	—		36	2
Rudar Pljevlja	2016–17	Montenegrin First League	14	2	2	0	2	0	—		11	2
Rudar Pljevlja	Total		61	7	5	0	2	0	—		68	7
Radnički Niš	2016–17	Serbian SuperLiga	15	2	0	0	—		—		15	2
Radnički Niš	2017–18	Serbian SuperLiga	26	3	1	0	—		—		27	3
Radnički Niš	2018–19	Serbian SuperLiga	28	2	4	0	4	0	—		36	2
Radnički Niš	2019–20	Serbian SuperLiga	10	2	0	0	1	0	—		11	2
Radnički Niš	Total		79	9	5	0	5	0	—		89	9
SKA-Khabarovsk	2020–21	Russian Football National League	5	0	0	0	—		—		5	0
Istiklol	2021	Tajikistan Higher League	19	4	4	2	1 (Note: Appearances in the AFC Champions League)	0	1 (Note: Appearances in the Tajik Supercup)	0	25	6
Barito Putera	2022–23	Liga 1	7	1	0	0	—		—		7	1
Career total			171	21	14	2	8	0	1	0	194	23

== Honours ==
Rudar Pljevlja

- Montenegrin First League: 2014–15
- Montenegrin Cup: 2016

Istiklol

- Tajikistan Higher League: 2021
- Tajik Supercup: 2021
