= Alisher Dzhalilov =

Tajik footballer (born 1993)

Alisher Jalilov
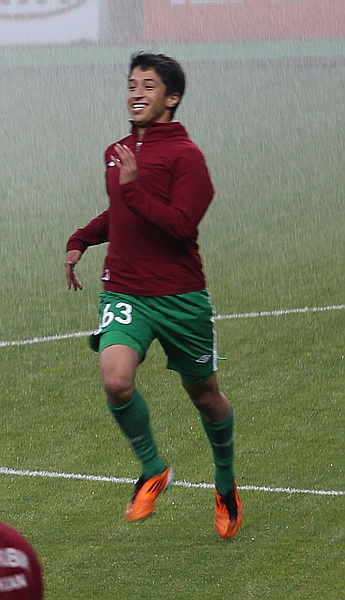
- Dzhalilov with Rubin Kazan in 2011

Personal information
- Full name: Alisher Jalilov
- Date of birth: August 29, 1993 (age 33)
- Place of birth: Latakhorak, near Dushanbe, Tajikistan
- Height: 1.68 m (5 ft 6 in)
- Position: Midfielder

Team information
- Current team: Istiklol
- Number: 10

Youth career
- Regar-TadAZ
- Lokomotiv Moscow

Senior career*
| Years | Team | Apps | (Gls) |
| 2009–2017 | Rubin Kazan | 8 | (0) |
| 2012–2013 | → Neftekhimik Nizhnekamsk (loan) | 28 | (2) |
| 2014 | → Neftekhimik Nizhnekamsk (loan) | 5 | (0) |
| 2014–2015 | → Rubin-2 Kazan | 14 | (1) |
| 2017–2018 | Baltika Kaliningrad | 27 | (4) |
| 2019–2022 | Istiklol | 59 | (35) |
| 2022 | AGMK | 22 | (2) |
| 2023– | Istiklol | 54 | (22) |

International career^{‡}
| 2010 | Russia U-17 | 5 | (2) |
| 2010–2011 | Russia U-18 | 11 | (7) |
| 2011 | Russia U-19 | 5 | (2) |
| 2013 | Russia U-20 | 3 | (1) |
| 2013 | Russia U-21 | 1 | (0) |
| 2019– | Tajikistan | 30 | (7) |
- * Club domestic league appearances and goals as of 10:16, 9 March 2026 (UTC) ‡ National team caps and goals as of 10:40, 21 November 2024 (UTC)

Alisher Lutfulloyevich Jalilov (Tajik: Алишер Лутфуллоевич Ҷалилов, Russian: Алишер Лутфуллоевич Джалилов; born 29 August 1993) is a Tajik professional footballer who plays as a midfielder for Istiklol. Dzhalilov also holds Russian citizenship and has played for several Russian national youth football teams, including U-21 in 2013.

== Career ==
=== Club ===
Dzhalilov made his Russian Premier League debut for FC Rubin Kazan on 18 June 2011 in a game against FC Rostov.

On 12 June 2017, he signed a two-year contract with FC Baltika Kaliningrad.

In December 2021, Dzhalilov was announced as Tajikistan Player of the Year for the second time, having previously won the same award in 2019.

In January 2022, Dzhalilov signed for AGMK.

On 9 February 2023, Istiklol announced the return of Dzhalilov.

=== International ===
At the end of May 2019, Dzhalilov was called up to the Tajikistan national football team for the first time, for their games against Afghanistan and China. Dzhalilov however was withdrawn from the squad on 3 June 2019, due to a knee injury. On 18 July 2019, Dzhalilov received international clearance from FIFA to play for Tajikistan. On 5 September 2019, he scored his first goal for the national team in match against Kyrgyzstan during the FIFA World Cup second qualifying round.

== Career statistics ==
=== Club ===
As of match played 7 March 2026

| Club | Season | League | | | National Cup (Note: Includes Russian Cup, Tajikistan Cup, Uzbekistan Cup) | | Continental | | Other | | Total | |
| Club | Season | Division | Apps | Goals | Apps | Goals | Apps | Goals | Apps | Goals | Apps | Goals |
|---|---|---|---|---|---|---|---|---|---|---|---|---|
| Rubin Kazan | 2009 | Russian Premier League | 0 | 0 | 0 | 0 | 0 (Note: Appearances in the UEFA Champions League) | 0 | 0 (Note: Appearances in the Russian Super Cup) | 0 | 0 | 0 |
| Rubin Kazan | 2010 | Russian Premier League | 0 | 0 | 0 | 0 | 0 (Note: Zero appearances in the UEFA Champions League and UEFA Europa League) | 0 | 0 | 0 | 0 | 0 |
| Rubin Kazan | 2011–12 | Russian Premier League | 3 | 0 | 1 | 0 | 1 (Note: One appearance in the UEFA Champions League, Zero appearances in the UEFA Europa League) | 0 | - | | 5 | 0 |
| Rubin Kazan | 2012–13 | Russian Premier League | 0 | 0 | 0 | 0 | 0 (Note: Appearances in the UEFA Europa League) | 0 | 0 | 0 | 0 | 0 |
| Rubin Kazan | 2013–14 | Russian Premier League | 1 | 0 | 1 | 0 | 1 | 0 | - | | 3 | 0 |
| Rubin Kazan | 2014–15 | Russian Premier League | 0 | 0 | 0 | 0 | - | | - | | 0 | 0 |
| Rubin Kazan | 2015–16 | Russian Premier League | 4 | 0 | 1 | 0 | 0 | 0 | - | | 5 | 0 |
| Rubin Kazan | 2016–17 | Russian Premier League | 0 | 0 | 0 | 0 | - | | - | | 0 | 0 |
| Rubin Kazan | Total | | 8 | 0 | 3 | 0 | 2 | 0 | 0 | 0 | 13 | 0 |
| Neftekhimik Nizhnekamsk (loan) | 2012–13 | Russian Football National League | 28 | 2 | 1 | 0 | - | | - | | 29 | 2 |
| Neftekhimik Nizhnekamsk (loan) | 2013–14 | Russian Football National League | 5 | 0 | 0 | 0 | - | | - | | 5 | 0 |
| Rubin-2 Kazan (loan) | 2014–15 | Russian Professional Football League | 14 | 1 | - | | - | | - | | 14 | 1 |
| Baltika Kaliningrad | 2017–18 | Russian Football National League | 27 | 4 | 1 | 0 | - | | - | | 28 | 4 |
| Istiklol | 2019 | Tajikistan Higher League | 15 | 11 | 4 | 2 | 7 (Note: One appearance in the AFC Champions League, six appearances and three goals in the AFC Cup) | 3 | 1 (Note: Appearances in the Tajik Supercup) | 0 | 27 | 16 |
| Istiklol | 2020 | Tajikistan Higher League | 17 | 12 | 1 | 1 | 3 (Note: Two appearances and one goal in the AFC Champions League, one appearance in the AFC Cup) | 1 | 1 | 0 | 22 | 14 |
| Istiklol | 2021 | Tajikistan Higher League | 27 | 12 | 4 | 1 | 7 (Note: Appearances and goals in the AFC Champions League) | 1 | 1 | 1 | 39 | 15 |
| Istiklol | Total | | 59 | 35 | 9 | 4 | 17 | 5 | 3 | 1 | 88 | 45 |
| AGMK | 2022 | Uzbekistan Super League | 22 | 2 | 3 | 1 | - | | - | | 25 | 3 |
| Istiklol | 2023 | Tajikistan Higher League | 21 | 13 | 5 | 1 | 6 | 1 | 1 | 0 | 33 | 15 |
| Istiklol | 2024 | Tajikistan Higher League | 18 | 6 | 4 | 1 | 6 (Note: Appearances in the AFC Champions League Two) | 0 | 1 | 0 | 29 | 7 |
| Istiklol | 2025 | Tajikistan Higher League | 14 | 3 | 2 | 1 | 2 | 0 | 1 | 0 | 19 | 4 |
| Istiklol | 2026 | Tajikistan Higher League | 1 | 0 | 0 | 0 | 0 (Note: Appearances in the AFC Challenge League) | 0 | 0 | 0 | 1 | 0 |
| Istiklol | Total | | 54 | 22 | 11 | 3 | 14 | 1 | 3 | 0 | 82 | 26 |
| Career total | | | 217 | 66 | 28 | 8 | 33 | 6 | 6 | 1 | 283 | 81 |

=== International ===
As of match played 19 November 2024

| National team | Year | Apps | Goals |
|---|---|---|---|
| Tajikistan | 2019 | 6 | 1 |
| Tajikistan | 2020 | 1 | 0 |
| Tajikistan | 2021 | 4 | 2 |
| Tajikistan | 2022 | 3 | 1 |
| Tajikistan | 2023 | 6 | 1 |
| Tajikistan | 2024 | 10 | 2 |
| Total | | 30 | 7 |

=== International goals ===
Scores and results list Tajikistan's goal tally first.

| No. | Date | Venue | Opponent | Score | Result | Competition |
|---|---|---|---|---|---|---|
| 1. | 5 September 2019 | Pamir Stadium, Dushanbe, Tajikistan | Kyrgyzstan | 1–0 | 1–0 | 2022 FIFA World Cup qualification |
| 2. | 5 February 2021 | UAE Football Association Stadium, Dubai, United Arab Emirates | Jordan | 1–0 | 1–0 | Friendly |
| 3. | 25 March 2021 | Pamir Stadium, Dushanbe, Tajikistan | Mongolia | 2–0 | 3–0 | 2022 FIFA World Cup qualification |
| 4. | 29 March 2022 | Markaziy Stadium, Namangan, Uzbekistan | Uganda | 1–1 | 1–1 | Friendly |
| 5. | 28 March 2023 | Jaber Al-Ahmad International Stadium, Kuwait City, Kuwait | Kuwait | 1–2 | 1–2 | Friendly |
| 6. | 13 November 2024 | Pamir Stadium, Dushanbe, Tajikistan | Nepal | 2–0 | 4–0 | Friendly |
| 7. | 13 November 2024 | Pamir Stadium, Dushanbe, Tajikistan | Nepal | 4–0 | 4–0 | Friendly |

== Honours ==
Istiklol

- Tajik League: 2019, 2020, 2021, 2023, 2024
- Tajik Cup: 2019, 2023
- Tajik Supercup: 2019, 2020, 2021, 2024

Individual

- Tajikistan player of the year: 2019, 2021
- Tajikistan Higher League top goalscorer: 2023
