= Hüseyin Doğan =

Dutch footballer (born 1994)

Personal information
- Date of birth: 22 January 1994 (age 32)
- Place of birth: The Hague, Netherlands
- Height: 1.76 m (5 ft 9 in)
- Position: Forward

Team information
- Current team: Scheveningen
- Number: 18

Youth career
- SC Feijenoord
- Haaglandia
- 2005–2013: Sparta

Senior career*
Years	Team	Apps	(Gls)
2013–2016	Sparta	48	(3)
2017–2019	TOP Oss	67	(25)
2019–2021	NAC	32	(8)
2021	Istiklol	3	(0)
2021–2022	TOP Oss	9	(0)
2022	Serik Belediyespor	12	(0)
2023–2024	De Graafschap	10	(1)
2024–	Scheveningen	38	(4)

International career
2012	Netherlands U18	1	(0)
2012–2013	Netherlands U19	6	(0)
2014	Netherlands U20	3	(0)
- * Club domestic league appearances and goals as of 02:19, 4 August 2025 (UTC)

Hüseyin Doğan (born 22 January 1994) is a Dutch professional footballer who plays as a forward for Vierde Divisie club Scheveningen.

== Club career ==
He came through the Sparta Rotterdam youth system and made his senior debut for them in September 2012 against Go Ahead Eagles.

Without a club for a year after Sparta released him in 2016, Doğan signed with FC Oss ahead of the 2017–18 season.

On 29 July 2019, Doğan signed for NAC Breda.

On 29 March 2021, Doğan signed for FC Istiklol on a one-year contract following a trial with the club. On 7 June 2021, Istiklol announced that Doğan had left the club by mutual consent.

On 22 September 2021, Doğan returned to TOP Oss.

On 8 September 2023, Doğan joined De Graafschap on amateur basis.

Doğan signed with Tweede Divisie club Scheveningen on 20 February 2024, and would join the club ahead of the 2024–25 season.

== Personal life ==
Born in the Netherlands, Doğan is of Turkish descent.

== Career statistics ==
=== Club ===
As of match played 26 November 2021

Club	Season	League			National Cup		Continental		Other		Total	
Club	Season	Division	Apps	Goals	Apps	Goals	Apps	Goals	Apps	Goals	Apps	Goals
Sparta Rotterdam	2011–12	Eerste Divisie	0	0	0	0	–		–		0	0
Sparta Rotterdam	2012–13	Eerste Divisie	1	0	0	0	–		–		1	0
Sparta Rotterdam	2013–14	Eerste Divisie	16	0	1	0	–		5 (Note: Appearance in the Eredivisie Play-offs)	0	0	0
Sparta Rotterdam	2014–15	Eerste Divisie	27	3	1	1	–		–		0	0
Sparta Rotterdam	2015–16	Eerste Divisie	4	0	0	0	–		–		0	0
Sparta Rotterdam	Total		48	3	2	1	–	–	5	0	55	4
TOP Oss	2017–18	Eerste Divisie	31	4	1	0	–		–		32	4
TOP Oss	2018–19	Eerste Divisie	36	21	1	0	–		1	0	38	21
TOP Oss	Total		67	25	2	0	–	–	1	0	70	25
NAC Breda	2019–20	Eerste Divisie	18	5	2	1	–		–		20	6
NAC Breda	2020–21	Eerste Divisie	14	3	1	0	–		–		15	3
NAC Breda	Total		32	8	3	1	–	–	–	–	35	9
Istiklol	2021	Tajik League	3	0	0	0	3 (Note: Appearances in the AFC Champions League)	0	1 (Note: Appearance and goal in the Tajik Supercup)	1	7	1
TOP Oss	2021–22	Eerste Divisie	9	0	1	0	–		–		10	0
Career total			159	36	8	2	3	0	7	0	177	39

== Honours ==
=== Club ===
Sparta Rotterdam

- Eerste Divisie: 2015–16

Istiklol

- Tajik Supercup: 2021
