= Nemanja Ilić (footballer) =

Serbian footballer

Personal information
- Date of birth: 27 August 1992 (age 34)
- Place of birth: Novi Sad, SFR Yugoslavia
- Height: 1.90 m (6 ft 3 in)
- Position: Centre-back

Team information
- Current team: Mladost Novi Sad
- Number: 4

Senior career*
| Years | Team | Apps | (Gls) |
| 2010–2011 | Obilić Zmajevo | | |
| 2012–2014 | ČSK Čelarevo | 63 | (2) |
| 2014–2019 | Bačka Palanka | 137 | (5) |
| 2019 | Rabotnički | 13 | (0) |
| 2020 | Samut Sakhon | 13 | (0) |
| 2021 | Sloboda Tuzla | 9 | (0) |
| 2021–2022 | Mladost Novi Sad | 23 | (0) |
| 2022 | Novi Sad 1921 | 14 | (1) |
| 2023 | Zlatibor Čajetina | 13 | (0) |
| 2023– | Mladost Novi Sad | 26 | (1) |
- * Club domestic league appearances and goals as of 6 October 2023

Nemanja Ilić (Serbian Cyrillic: Немања Илић; born 27 August 1992) is a Serbian footballer who plays as a centre back for Mladost Novi Sad.

== Career ==
On 10 March 2021, Ilić joined FC Istiklol on trial.
