= Manuchekhr Safarov =

Tajikistani footballer (born 2001)

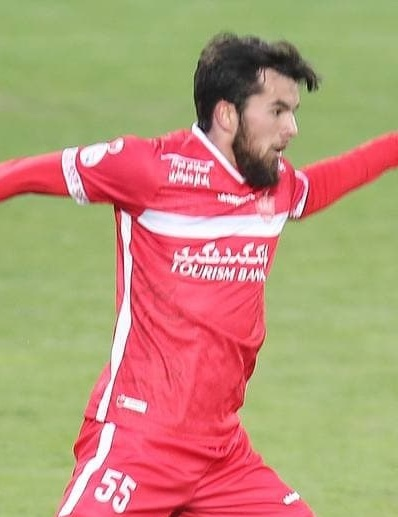
- Safarov with Persepolis in 2022

Personal information
- Full name: Manuchekhr Firdavsiyevich Safarov
- Date of birth: 31 May 2001 (age 25)
- Place of birth: Khujand, Tajikistan
- Height: 1.77 m (5 ft 10 in)
- Positions: Right-back; winger

Team information
- Current team: Istiklol
- Number: 55

Senior career*
Years	Team	Apps	(Gls)
2017–2018	Barkchi		
2019	Sipar Khujand Futsal		
2019	→ Khujand (loan)	7	(0)
2020	Khujand	7	(0)
2020	Lokomotiv-Pamir	9	(1)
2021	Istiklol	19	(3)
2021–2022	Persepolis	2	(0)
2022–2023	Lokomotiv Tashkent	26	(1)
2023–2024	Neftchi Fergana	23	(1)
2024–2025	Dinamo Samarqand	1	(0)
2025–	Istiklol	10	(1)

International career^{‡}
2019–	Tajikistan	53	(2)
- * Club domestic league appearances and goals as of 10:20, 9 March 2026 (UTC) ‡ National team caps and goals as of 18 November 2025

Manuchekhr Firdavsiyevich Safarov (Tajik: Манучеҳр Фирдавсиевич Сафаров, Russian: Манучехр Фирдавсиевич Сафаров), born 31 May 2001) is a Tajikistani professional footballer who plays as a right-back for Uzbekistan Super League club Istiklol.

== Club career ==
=== Khujand ===
On 12 July 2019, Safarov signed for FK Khujand on loan from Futsal club Sipar Khujand.

=== Lokomotiv Pamir ===
On 1 August 2020, Safarov left Khujand to sign for Lokomotiv-Pamir.

=== Istiklol ===
On 29 March 2021, Safarov signed for FC Istiklol.

=== Persepolis ===
On 7 November 2021, Safarov left Istiklol with Vahdat Hanonov to sign for Iranian club Persepolis, on a contract until 30 June 2024. On 17 January 2022, Safarov made his debut in a 3–0 away win against Zob Ahan Esfahan.

=== Lokomotiv Tashkent ===
On 20 July 2022, Lokomotiv Tashkent announced the signing of Safarov.

=== Neftchi Fergana ===
On 8 December 2023, Neftchi Fergana announced the signing of Safarov to a two-year contract following the expiration of his Lokomotiv Tashkent contract.

=== Istiklol return ===
On 10 July 2025, Istiklol announced the return of Safarov from Dinamo Samarqand. On 15 January 2026, Istiklol announced that they had extended their contract with Safarov until the end of the 2026 season.

== International career ==
Safarov made his senior team debut on 10 September 2019 against Mongolia.

== Career statistics ==
=== Club ===
As of match played 7 March 2026

Club	Season	League			National Cup (Note: Includes Tajikistan Cup, Hazfi Cup, Uzbekistan Cup)		Continental		Other		Total	
Club	Season	Division	Apps	Goals	Apps	Goals	Apps	Goals	Apps	Goals	Apps	Goals
Istiklol	2021	Tajik League	19	3	3	0	6 (Note: Appearances and goals in the AFC Champions League)	2	1 (Note: Appearances in the Tajik Supercup)	0	29	5
Persepolis	2021–22	Pro League	2	0	2	0	0	0	1 (Note: Appearances in the Iranian Super Cup)	0	5	0
Lokomotiv Tashkent	2022	Uzbekistan Super League	13	0	2	0	-		1 (Note: Appearances in the Uzbekistan Super League Relegation play-offs)	0	16	0
Lokomotiv Tashkent	2023	Uzbekistan Pro League	13	1	3	0	-		-		16	1
Lokomotiv Tashkent	Total		26	1	5	0	-	-	1	0	32	1
Neftchi Fergana	2024	Uzbekistan Super League	23	1	1	0	-		-		24	1
Dinamo Samarqand	2025	Uzbekistan Super League	1	0	1	0	–		–		2	0
Istiklol	2025	Tajikistan Higher League	9	1	2	0	6	0	0	0	17	1
Istiklol	2026	Tajikistan Higher League	1	0	0	0	0	0	0	0	1	0
Istiklol	Total		10	1	2	0	6	0	0	0	18	1
Career total			81	6	14	0	12	2	3	0	110	8

=== International ===
As of match played 14 October 2025

Tajikistan
Year	Apps	Goals
2019	5	0
2020	3	0
2021	6	0
2022	8	0
2023	8	0
2024	16	1
2025	9	1
Total	55	2

Statistics accurate as of match played 14 October 2025

=== International goals ===
Scores and results list Tajikistan's goal tally first.

No.	Date	Venue	Opponent	Score	Result	Competition
1.	11 June 2024	Pamir Stadium, Dushanbe, Tajikistan	Pakistan	2–0	3–0	2026 FIFA World Cup qualification
2.	14 October 2025	National Football Stadium, Malé, Maldives	Maldives	1–0	3–0	2027 AFC Asian Cup qualification

== Honours ==
Istiklol

- Tajik Supercup: 2021

Persepolis

- Iranian Super Cup runner-up: 2021

Tajikistan

- King's Cup: 2022
- Merdeka Tournament: 2023
