= Mubin Ergashev =

Tajik footballer (born 1973)

Personal information
- Full name: Mubin Asrorovich Ergashev
- Date of birth: 6 October 1973 (age 53)
- Place of birth: Dushanbe, Tajik SSR, Soviet Union
- Position: Midfielder

Senior career*
Years	Team	Apps	(Gls)
1990	Regar-TadAZ		

Managerial career
- 2013–2014: Khujand
- 2013: Tajikistan (caretaker)
- 2014–2016: Istiklol
- 2015–2016: Tajikistan
- 2017–2018: Barkchi
- 2017–2018: Tajikistan U18
- 2018–: Tajikistan U19
- 2020: Istiklol (Interim)
- 2020–2021: Lokomotiv-Pamir
- 2021: Istiklol (Interim)
- 2021: Tajikistan (Interim)
- 2025–: Tajikistan Women
- * Club domestic league appearances and goals

Mubin Asrorovich Ergashev (Russian: Мубин Асрорович Эргашев; born 6 October 1973) is a Tajik former professional footballer and current head coach of Lokomotiv-Pamir and Tajikistan U19. Ergashev is also currently the head coach of Tajikistan women's national football team.

== Career ==
=== Managerial ===
On 13 January 2014, Ergashev was appointed as manager of FC Istiklol. In July 2015, following the resignation of Mukhsin Mukhamadiev, Ergashev also took up the manager's job of the Tajikistan national team.

In December 2015 Ergashev was awarded an UEFA Pro coaching license. Following Tajikistan's disappointing 2018 FIFA World Cup qualifying campaign, Ergashev and his staff were relieved of their duties.

On 10 July 2016, FC Istiklol fired their entire coaching staff, including manager Ergashev.

On 9 June 2017, Barkchi appointed Ergashev as their manager after Vitaliy Levchenko joined the coaching staff of Krylia Sovetov. On 13 April 2021, FC Istiklol announced Ergashev as their interim manager for their AFC Champions League group games due to having the required Pro Coaching License, which Levchenko did not.

On 8 November, Ergashev was announced as Tajikistan's interim head coach for their game against Kazakhstan.

== Coaching statistics ==
As of match played 4 October 2020

Team	From	To	Record							
Team	From	To	G	W	D	L	GF	GA	GD	Win %
Tajikistan (Caretaker)	May 2013	June 2013	1	1	0	0	3	2	+1	100.00
Istiklol	13 January 2014	10 July 2016	75	55	11	9	248	64	+184	73.33
Tajikistan	28 July 2015	30 March 2016	6	1	0	5	5	16	−11	16.67
Barkchi	9 June 2017	31 December 2018	41	11	4	26	45	53	−8	26.83
Istiklol (Interim)	1 January 2020	17 February 2020	2	1	0	1	1	1	+0	50.00
Lokomotiv-Pamir	18 February 2020	Present	20	4	5	11	18	31	−13	20.00
Total			145	73	20	52	320	167	+153	50.34

== Honours ==
=== Manager ===
Istiklol

- Tajik League (2): 2014, 2015
- Tajik Cup (2):2014, 2015
- Tajik Super Cup (3): 2014, 2015, 2016
