= Chorgulteppa =

- Jamoat
- Location within Tajikistan
- Coordinates: 38°26′N 68°44′E
- Country: Tajikistan
- Region: Districts of Republican Subordination
- District: Rudaki District

Population (2015)
  - Total: 37,551
- Time zone: UTC+5 (TJT)

Chorgulteppa (Tajik: Чоргултеппа, formerly: Kuktosh) is a jamoat in Tajikistan. It is located in Rudaki District, one of the Districts of Republican Subordination. The jamoat has a total population of 37,551 (2015).
