= Ilhomjon Barotov =

Tajikistani professional football player

Personal information
- Date of birth: 21 July 1990 (age 36)
- Place of birth: Tajik SSR, Soviet Union
- Height: 1.83 m (6 ft 0 in)
- Position: Midfielder

Team information
- Current team: Istaravshan

Senior career*
Years	Team	Apps	(Gls)
2012	Ravshan Kulob		
2013–2015	Istaravshan		
2016	Khujand		
2017–	Istaravshan		

International career^{‡}
2013–	Tajikistan	9	(1)
- * Club domestic league appearances and goals as of 20:29, 31 March 2020 (UTC) ‡ National team caps and goals as of 19:38, 30 May 2021 (UTC)

Ilhomjon Barotov (born 21 July 1990) is a Tajik professional football player who plays for FK Istaravshan as a midfielder.

== Career ==
=== International ===
Saidov made his senior team debut on 15 October 2013 against Kyrgyzstan.

== Career statistics ==
=== International ===
Tajikistan national team
Year	Apps	Goals
2013	1	0
2014	0	0
2015	0	0
2016	0	0
2017	0	0
2018	0	0
2019	4	1
2020	1	0
2021	3	0
Total	9	1

Statistics accurate as of match played 29 May 2021

=== International goals ===
Scores and results list Tajikistan's goal tally first, score column indicates score after each Barotov goal.

List of international goals scored by Ilhomjon Barotov
No.	Date	Venue	Cap	Opponent	Score	Result	Competition
1	10 July 2019	TransStadia Arena, Ahmedabad, India	3	Syria	2–0	2–0	2019 Intercontinental Cup
