= FC Lokomotiv-Pamir =

Lokomotiv-Pamir
- Full name: Football Club Lokomotiv-Pamir
- Founded: 1961; 64 years ago 2008; 17 years ago (refounded)
- Ground: Lokomotiv Stadium
- Manager: Mubin Ergashev
- League: Tajikistan Higher League
- 2020: Tajikistan Higher League, 9th of 10

FC Lokomotiv-Pamir is a Tajik professional football club based in Dushanbe, that competes in the Tajikistan Higher League.

== History ==
FC Lokomotiv-Pamir is a Tajik football club based in Dushanbe originally founded in 1961 as Lokomotiv Dushanbe. After initially being disbanded in the early 1990s, Lokomotiv Dushanbe were revived in early 1999 before again being disbanded at the end of 2000. Lokomotiv Dushanbe were resounded again in 2008, before merging with Pamir in 2017 to become Lokomotiv-Pamir.

=== Domestic history ===
Season	League									Tajik Cup	Top goalscorer		Manager
Season	Div.	Pos.	Pl.	W	D	L	GS	GA	P	Tajik Cup	Name	League	Manager
1999	1st	11th	22	2	2	18	13	76	8				
2000	1st	10th	34	1	6	27	19	111	9				
2019	2nd	1st	26	19	4	3	80	24	61		(Tajikistan) Rustam Soirov (Tajikistan) Azizbek Khasanov	13	
2020	1st	9th	18	3	5	10	14	26	14	Quarterfinal	(Tajikistan) Azizbek Khasanov (Tajikistan) Shakhrom Sulaimonov (Tajikistan) Islom Zoirov	3	(Tajikistan) Mubin Ergashev

== Current squad ==
As of 8 August 2020

Note: Flags indicate national team as defined under FIFA eligibility rules; some limited exceptions apply. Players may hold more than one non-FIFA nationality.

No.	Pos.	Nation	Player
3	DF	TJK	Rahmatzoda Rahmatsho
4	DF	TJK	Mahmud Pirov
7	MF	TJK	Emomali Ahmadhon
8	MF	TJK	Shukhrat Elmurodov
10	MF	TJK	Fakhriddin Ahtamov
11	DF	TJK	Shohrukh Sangov
16	GK	TJK	Shokhrukh Kirgizboev
18	FW	TJK	Azizbek Khasanov
20	MF	TJK	Ozodbek Panjiev
22	DF	TJK	Isroil Kholov
23	DF	TJK	Jonibek Sharipov
56	FW	TJK	Khusrav Toirov

No.	Pos.	Nation	Player
69	FW	TJK	Parviz Khodzhiev
70	MF	TJK	Shakhrom Sulaimonov (loan from Istiklol)
88	GK	TJK	Samandar Karimov
—	DF	TJK	Siyovush Asrorov
—	DF	TJK	Manuchehr Safarov
—	DF	TJK	Muhammad Salomzoda
—	MF	IRN	Radin Sayyar
—	MF	TJK	Ismoil Alimardonov
—	MF	TJK	Sharifbek Rakhmatov (loan from Istiklol)
—	MF	TJK	Nidoyor Zabirov
—	FW	TJK	Islom Zoirov
