= Istaravshan Sports Complex =

Sports complex in Istaravshan, Tajikistan

Coordinates: 39°54′5.0″N 69°0′32.2″E

- Interactive map of Istaravshan Sports Complex
- Full name: Istaravshan Sports Complex
- Capacity: 18,000
- Surface: Grass

Construction
- Opened: 2012 (reconstruction)

Istaravshan Sports Complex is a sports complex in Istaravshan, Tajikistan. Istaravshan Stadium is the main stadium at the sports complex.

In addition to the football stadium, its premises include a large sports gym, tennis courts, children's football field, martial arts areas, and a swimming pool.

On August 11, 2012, chaos ensued when a late goal by visitors Energetik Dushanbe was allowed by the referee. A pitch invasion followed, forcing the players to retreat to the changing rooms. Energetik Dushanbe abandoned the match when the pitch was cleared.

== Renovation and reconstruction ==
On his visit to Istaravshan District, then president Emomali Rahmon attended the reopening ceremony of Istaravshan Sports Complex.
