= 2022 FC Istiklol season =

FC Istiklol
2022 season
- President: Shohruh Saidov
- Manager: Vitaliy Levchenko (until 27 June); Mubin Ergashev (Interim) (AFC Champions League); Alisher Tukhtaev (Interim) (from 27 June)
- Stadium: Republican Stadium
- Tajikistan Higher League: 1st (champions)
- Tajikistan Cup: Winners
- Super Cup: Winners
- AFC Champions League: Group stage
- Top goalscorer: League: Manuchekhr Dzhalilov (16); All: Manuchekhr Dzhalilov (22)
| Home colours | Away colours |

The FC Istiklol 2022 season was Istiklol's fourteenth Tajik League season, of which they are defending Tajik League Champions, whilst they also participated in the Tajik Cup, Tajik Supercup and AFC Champions League.

== Season events ==
On 26 February, Zoir Juraboev left Istiklol to join Surkhon in the Uzbekistan Super League.

On 10 March, Amirbek Juraboev left Istiklol to join United City in the Philippines Football League.

On 19 March, Shokhrukh Kirgizboev joined Khujand on loan for the season.

Istiklol's first four Tajikistan Higher League matches of the season where postponed due to their participation on the 2022 AFC Champions League.

On 31 March, Istiklol announced the signings of Nuriddin Davronov, Eric Bocoum, Nikita Chicherin, Uladzislaw Kasmynin, Temur Partsvania, Mukhammad Isaev, Sayedi Kovussho, Mukhammadzhon Rakhimov, Tabrezi Davlatmir and Alidzhon Karomatullozoda.

On 26 June, Istiklol announced that Nuriddin Davronov had left the club to sign for Mohammedan on a one-year contract.

On 27 June, Vitaly Levchenko and his coaching staff left Istiklol after their contracts expired, with Assistant Manager Alisher Tukhtaev being placed in interim charger.

On 6 July, Istiklol announced that Nikita Chicherin and Mukhammad Isaev had left the club after their contracts had expired.

On 2 August, Istiklol announced that Rustam Soirov had left the club to join Levadia Tallinn on a three-year contract. The following day, 3 August, Istiklol announced the signings of Gonzalo Ritacco, Siyovush Asrorov, Idriss Aminu, Hlib Hrachov and Parviz Baki-Akhunov.

== Squad ==
As of match played 27 November 2022

| No. | Name | Nationality | Position | Date of birth (age) | Signed from | Signed in | Contract ends | Apps. | Goals |
Goalkeepers
| 1 | Rustam Yatimov | (Tajikistan) | GK | 13 July 1998 (aged 24) | Unattached | 2018 | | 89 | 0 |
| 16 | Olimjon Juraev | (Tajikistan) | GK | | | 2022 | | 0 | 0 |
| 50 | Mukhriddin Khasanov | (Tajikistan) | GK | 23 September 2002 (aged 20) | Khujand | 2021 | | 23 | 0 |
Defenders
| 2 | Siyovush Asrorov | (Tajikistan) | DF | 21 July 1992 (aged 30) | Rahmatganj MFS | 2022 | | 148 | 11 |
| 3 | Tabrezi Davlatmir | (Tajikistan) | DF | 6 June 1998 (aged 24) | Narva Trans | 2022 | | 102 | 2 |
| 4 | Temur Partsvania | (Ukraine) | DF | 6 July 1991 (aged 31) | Zhetysu | 2022 | | 18 | 1 |
| 14 | Sayedi Kovussho | (Tajikistan) | DF | 2 June 1995 (aged 27) | CSKA Pamir Dushanbe | 2022 | | 25 | 1 |
| 17 | Uladzislaw Kasmynin | (Belarus) | DF | 17 January 1990 (aged 32) | Turon Yaypan | 2022 | | 27 | 2 |
| 19 | Akhtam Nazarov | (Tajikistan) | DF | 29 September 1992 (aged 30) | Bashundhara Kings | 2020 | | 254 | 23 |
| 23 | Alidzhon Karomatullozoda | (Tajikistan) | DF | 5 May 2002 (aged 20) | CSKA Pamir Dushanbe | 2022 | | 25 | 2 |
| 27 | Daler Imomnazarov | (Tajikistan) | DF | 31 May 1995 (aged 27) | Dushanbe-83 | 2021 | 2023 | 46 | 1 |
| 28 | Mukhammad Mukhammadzoda | (Tajikistan) | DF | 14 April 2005 (aged 17) | Youth Team | 2022 | | 5 | 0 |
| 51 | Hlib Hrachov | (Ukraine) | DF | 15 May 1997 (aged 25) | Asteras Vlachioti | 2022 | | 17 | 0 |
Midfielders
| 5 | Rustam Kamolov | (Tajikistan) | MF | | Youth Team | 2022 | | 5 | 0 |
| 7 | Mukhammadzhon Rakhimov | (Tajikistan) | MF | 15 October 1998 (aged 24) | Ordabasy | 2022 | | 139 | 24 |
| 10 | Gonzalo Ritacco | (Argentina) | MF | 21 May 1993 (aged 29) | Qizilqum Zarafshon | 2022 | | 15 | 4 |
| 15 | Idriss Aminu | (Ghana) | MF | 15 July 1998 (aged 24) | CSKA Pamir Dushanbe | 2022 | | 15 | 0 |
| 22 | Parviz Baki-Akhunov | (Tajikistan) | MF | 9 July 1998 (aged 24) | Khatlon | 2022 | | 7 | 0 |
| 70 | Shahrom Sulaymonov | (Tajikistan) | MF | 27 June 1997 (aged 25) | Utenis Utena | 2018 | | 94 | 4 |
| | Saydali Ibragimov | (Tajikistan) | MF | 10 April 2007 (aged 15) | Youth Team | 2022 | | 5 | 0 |
Forwards
| 11 | Shervoni Mabatshoev | (Tajikistan) | FW | 4 December 2000 (aged 21) | CSKA Pamir Dushanbe | 2021 | 2023 | 50 | 21 |
| 20 | Shukhratdzhon Shonazarov | (Tajikistan) | FW | | Youth Team | 2022 | | 5 | 0 |
| 63 | Manuchekhr Dzhalilov | (Tajikistan) | FW | 27 September 1990 (aged 32) | Persebaya Surabaya | 2020 | | 175 | 154 |
Youth team players
| | Amir Nigmatov | (Tajikistan) | DF | 28 April 1999 (aged 23) | Youth Team | 2018 | | 2 | 0 |
| | Shahbol Rajabov | (Tajikistan) | DF | 4 January 2000 (aged 22) | Youth Team | 2018 | | 1 | 0 |
| | Amirjon Khudoidodov | (Tajikistan) | FW | | Youth Team | 2021 | | 1 | 0 |
Away on loan
| 16 | Shokhrukh Kirgizboev | (Tajikistan) | GK | 1 May 2002 (aged 20) | Kuktosh | 2021 | | 13 | 0 |
Left during the season
| 5 | Iskandar Dzhalilov | (Tajikistan) | DF | 1 June 1992 (aged 30) | Botev Vratsa | 2019 | | 69 | 2 |
| 6 | Zoir Juraboev | (Tajikistan) | DF | 16 September 1998 (aged 24) | Metallurg Bekabad | 2019 | | 83 | 5 |
| 8 | Nuriddin Davronov | (Tajikistan) | MF | 16 January 1991 (aged 31) | Borneo | 2022 | | | |
| 9 | Rustam Soirov | (Tajikistan) | FW | 12 September 2002 (aged 20) | Lokomotiv Pamir | 2020 | | 69 | 31 |
| 20 | Amirbek Juraboev | (Tajikistan) | MF | 13 April 1996 (aged 26) | Navbahor Namangan | 2020 | | 131 | 7 |
| 44 | Nikita Chicherin | (Russia) | DF | 18 August 1990 (aged 32) | Neftekhimik Nizhnekamsk | 2022 | | 12 | 0 |
| 77 | Mukhammad Isaev | (Uzbekistan) | MF | 1 September 1994 (aged 28) | Metallurg Bekabad | 2022 | | 10 | 1 |
| 84 | Islom Zoirov | (Tajikistan) | MF | 12 January 2002 (aged 20) | Lokomotiv-Pamir | 2021 | | 41 | 3 |
| 90 | Eric Bocoum | (Gabon) | FW | 10 March 1996 (aged 26) | on loan from Gol Gohar | 2022 | 2022 | 8 | 1 |

== Transfers ==
=== In ===
| Date | Position | Nationality | Name | From | Fee | Ref. |
|---|---|---|---|---|---|---|
| 31 March 2022 | DF | (Belarus) | Uladzislaw Kasmynin | Turon Yaypan | Free | |
| 31 March 2022 | DF | (Russia) | Nikita Chicherin | Neftekhimik Nizhnekamsk | Undisclosed | |
| 31 March 2022 | DF | (Tajikistan) | Alidzhon Karomatullozoda | CSKA Pamir Dushanbe | Undisclosed | |
| 31 March 2022 | DF | (Tajikistan) | Tabrezi Davlatmir | Narva Trans | Undisclosed | |
| 31 March 2022 | DF | (Ukraine) | Temur Partsvania | Zhetysu | Undisclosed | |
| 31 March 2022 | MF | (Tajikistan) | Nuriddin Davronov | Borneo | Free | |
| 31 March 2022 | MF | (Tajikistan) | Sayedi Kovussho | CSKA Pamir Dushanbe | Undisclosed | |
| 31 March 2022 | MF | (Tajikistan) | Mukhammadzhon Rakhimov | Ordabasy | Undisclosed | |
| 31 March 2022 | MF | (Uzbekistan) | Mukhammad Isaev | Metallurg Bekabad | Undisclosed | |
| 3 August 2022 | DF | (Tajikistan) | Siyovush Asrorov | Rahmatganj MFS | Undisclosed | |
| 3 August 2022 | DF | (Ukraine) | Hlib Hrachov | Asteras Vlachioti | Undisclosed | |
| 3 August 2022 | MF | (Ghana) | Idriss Aminu | CSKA Pamir Dushanbe | Undisclosed | |
| 3 August 2022 | MF | (Tajikistan) | Parviz Baki-Akhunov | Khatlon | Undisclosed | |
| 3 August 2022 | MF | (Argentina) | Gonzalo Ritacco | Qizilqum Zarafshon | Undisclosed | |

=== Loans in ===
| Date | Position | Nationality | Name | From | Fee | Ref. |
|---|---|---|---|---|---|---|
| 31 March 2022 | FW | (Gabon) | Eric Bocoum | Gol Gohar Sirjan | 4 July 2022 | |

=== Out ===
| Date | Position | Nationality | Name | To | Fee | Ref. |
|---|---|---|---|---|---|---|
| 17 January 2022 | MF | (Tajikistan) | Alisher Dzhalilov | AGMK | Undisclosed | |
| 25 January 2022 | MF | (Tajikistan) | Sharifbek Rakhmatov | Turon Yaypan | Undisclosed | |
| 26 February 2022 | DF | (Tajikistan) | Zoir Juraboev | Surkhon | Undisclosed | |
| 10 March 2022 | MF | (Tajikistan) | Amirbek Juraboev | United City | Undisclosed | |
| 26 June 2022 | MF | (Tajikistan) | Nuriddin Davronov | Mohammedan | Undisclosed | |
| 2 August 2022 | FW | (Tajikistan) | Rustam Soirov | Levadia Tallinn | Undisclosed | |

=== Released ===
| Date | Position | Nationality | Name | Joined | Date | Ref |
|---|---|---|---|---|---|---|
| 15 May 2022 | DF | (Tajikistan) | Iskandar Dzhalilov | Retirement | | |
| 6 July 2022 | DF | (Russia) | Nikita Chicherin | Media Football League | | |
| 6 July 2022 | MF | (Uzbekistan) | Mukhammad Isaev | Yangiyer | 25 July 2022 | |
| 28 July 2022 | MF | (Tajikistan) | Islom Zoirov | Banned | | |
| 31 December 2022 | DF | (Belarus) | Uladzislaw Kasmynin | Metallurg Bekabad | | |
| 31 December 2022 | DF | (Ukraine) | Temur Partsvania | | | |
| 31 December 2022 | MF | (Argentina) | Gonzalo Ritacco | Deportivo Táchira | | |

=== Trial ===
| Date From | Position | Nationality | Name | Last club | Date To | Ref. |
|---|---|---|---|---|---|---|
| July 2022 | DF | (Ukraine) | Hlib Hrachov | Asteras Vlachioti | 3 August 2022 | |
| July 2022 | MF | (Ghana) | Idriss Aminu | CSKA Pamir Dushanbe | 3 August 2022 | |
| July 2022 | FW | (Tajikistan) | Parviz Baki-Akhunov | Khatlon | 3 August 2022 | |

== Friendlies ==
| 14 February 2022 | Istiklol | 0–0 | CSKA Pamir Dushanbe | Dushanbe |
| 15:00 (UTC+5) | | Report | | Stadium: Pamir Stadium |

| 15 February 2022 | Istiklol | 1–2 | Regar-TadAZ Tursunzoda | Dushanbe |
| 15:30 (UTC+5) | | Report | | Stadium: Pamir Stadium |

| 22 February 2022 | Istiklol (Tajikistan) | 1–2 | (Ukraine) Metalist Kharkiv | Belek, Turkey |
| 16:00 (UTC+5) | | Report |

| 26 February 2022 | Istiklol (Tajikistan) | 0–0 | (Latvia) Auda | Belek, Turkey |
| 18:00 (UTC+5) | | Report |

| 28 February 2022 | Istiklol (Tajikistan) | 0–1 | (Latvia) Valmiera | Belek, Turkey |
| 17:00 (UTC+5) | | Report |

| 3 March 2022 | Istiklol (Tajikistan) | 0–1 | (Russia) Novosibirsk | Belek, Turkey |
| (UTC+5) | | Report |

| 18 July 2022 | Istiklol | 3–1 | CSKA Pamir Dushanbe | Almosi |
| 17:40 (UTC+5) | I.Aminu; Zoirov; Imomnazarov | Report | E.Rashidbekov | Stadium: Training Ground; Referee: Gulmurodi Sadullo |

| 22 July 2022 | Navbahor Namangan (Uzbekistan) | 1–1 | (Tajikistan) Istiklol | Namangan, Uzbekistan |
| 20:00 (UTC+5) | D.Turopov 27' | Report | Dzhalilov 29' (pen.) | Stadium: Markaziy Stadium |

| 25 July 2022 | Lokomotiv Tashkent (Uzbekistan) | 0–0 | (Tajikistan) Istiklol | Tashkent, Uzbekistan |
| 20:00 (UTC+5) | | Report | | Stadium: Lokomotiv Stadium |

| 29 July 2022 | Andijon (Uzbekistan) | 3–0 | (Tajikistan) Istiklol | Tashkent, Uzbekistan |
| 19:00 (UTC+5) | Milić 47'; G.Milojko 64'; M.Rasulov 90+3' | Report | | Stadium: Milliy Stadium |

== TFF Cup ==
=== Preliminary round ===
| Pos | Team | Pld | W | D | L | GF | GA | GD | Pts | Qualification |
|---|---|---|---|---|---|---|---|---|---|---|
| 1 | Istiklol | 4 | 4 | 0 | 0 | 22 | 0 | +22 | 12 | |
| 2 | Kuktosh Rudaki | 3 | 2 | 0 | 1 | 10 | 7 | +3 | 6 | Advance to Finals Stage |
| 3 | CSKA Pamir Dushanbe | 4 | 2 | 0 | 2 | 8 | 8 | 0 | 6 | Advance to Finals Stage |
| 4 | Vahdat | 3 | 1 | 0 | 2 | 8 | 6 | +2 | 3 | |
| 5 | Shohmansur | 4 | 0 | 0 | 4 | 1 | 28 | −27 | 0 | |

Updated to match(es) played on 8 February 2022. Source: http://fft.tj/molodezhnaya-sbornaya-tadzhikistana-u-19-istiklol-i-regar-tadaz-vyshli-v-finalnuyu-chast-kubka-fft-2022/

| 30 January 2022 1 | Istiklol | 3–0 | Vahdat | Dushanbe |
| 14:00 (UTC+5) | Dzhalilov 8', 20'; Nazarov 14' | Report | A.Rakhimov (yellow card) | Stadium: Pamir Stadium; Attendance: 100; Referee: Shahboz Zardov |

| 2 February 2022 2 | Shohmansur | 0–10 | Istiklol | Hisor |
| 10:00 (UTC+5) | F.Tabarukov (yellow card) (yellow-red card) 63'; А.Nozimzoda (yellow card) | Report | | Stadium: Central Stadium; Referee: Safarali Mahmadizoda |

| 5 February 2022 3 | Istiklol | 3–0 | CSKA Pamir Dushanbe | Dushanbe |
| 14:00 (UTC+5) | Sulaymonov 11'; Dzhalilov 40'; Soirov 84' | Report | | Stadium: Pamir Stadium; Attendance: 200; Referee: Abdullo Davlatov |

| 8 February 2022 4 | Kuktosh Rudaki | 0–6 | Istiklol | Dushanbe |
| 14:00 (UTC+5) | | Report | | Stadium: Pamir Stadium |

== Competitions ==
=== Overview ===
| Competition | First match | Last match | Starting round | Final position | Record | | | | | | | |
| Competition | First match | Last match | Starting round | Final position | Pld | W | D | L | GF | GA | GD | Win % |
|---|---|---|---|---|---|---|---|---|---|---|---|---|
| Tajikistan Higher League | 12 May 2022 | 27 November 2022 | Matchday 1 | Winners | 22 | 14 | 6 | 2 | 46 | 13 | +33 | 63.64 |
| Tajikistan Cup | 6 August 2022 | 29 October 2022 | Last 16 | Winners | 5 | 3 | 2 | 0 | 11 | 3 | +8 | 60.00 |
| Tajik Super Cup | 8 May 2022 | 8 May 2022 | Final | Winners | 1 | 1 | 0 | 0 | 1 | 0 | +1 | 100.00 |
| AFC Champions League | 8 April 2022 | 28 April 2022 | Group Stage | 4th | 6 | 1 | 0 | 5 | 5 | 10 | −5 | 16.67 |
| Total | | | | | 34 | 19 | 8 | 7 | 63 | 26 | +37 | 55.88 |

Last updated: 27 November 2022
Source: Competitions

=== Tajik Supercup ===
| 8 May 2022 | Istiklol | 1–0 | Khujand | Tursunzoda |
| 16:00 (UTC+5) | Soirov 84'; Yatimov (yellow card); Davronov (yellow card); Zoirov (yellow card) | Report | F.Abdusalimov (yellow card) | Stadium: TALCO Arena; Attendance: 5,600; Referee: Nasim Khamidov |

=== Tajikistan Higher League ===
==== Regular season ====
===== Results summary =====
| Overall | | | | | | | | Home | | | | | | Away | | | | | |
| Pld | W | D | L | GF | GA | GD | Pts | W | D | L | GF | GA | GD | W | D | L | GF | GA | GD |
|---|---|---|---|---|---|---|---|---|---|---|---|---|---|---|---|---|---|---|---|
| 18 | 11 | 6 | 1 | 38 | 11 | +27 | 39 | 7 | 1 | 1 | 22 | 4 | +18 | 4 | 5 | 0 | 16 | 7 | +9 |

Last updated: 23 October 2022.
Source: See Results

===== Results by round =====
| Round | 1 | 2 | 3 | 4 | 5 | 6 | 7 | 8 | 9 | 10 | 11 | 12 | 13 | 14 | 15 | 16 | 17 | 18 |
|---|---|---|---|---|---|---|---|---|---|---|---|---|---|---|---|---|---|---|
| Ground | A (Note: matchday 6) | H (Note: matchday 7) | H (Note: matchday 8) | H (Note: matchday 9) | H (Note: matchday 10) | H (Note: matchday 11) | H (Note: matchday 12) | H (Note: matchday 1) | H (Note: matchday 13) | A (Note: matchday 2) | H (Note: matchday 3) | A (Note: matchday 14) | A (Note: matchday 15) | A (Note: matchday 16) | A (Note: matchday 4) | H (Note: matchday 17) | H (Note: matchday 5) | A |
| Result | D | D | W | W | W | W | W | L | W | D | W | W | W | D | D | W | W | D |
| Position | 10 | 10 | 9 | 6 | 5 | 4 | 4 | 4 | 2 | 2 | 1 | 1 | 1 | 1 | 1 | 1 | 1 | 1 |

Source: Results
A = Away; H = Home; W = Win; D = Draw; L = Loss

===== Results =====
| 12 May 2022 6 | Khatlon | 1–1 | Istiklol | Bokhtar |
| 17:00 (UTC+5) | M.Naskov 5'; K.Turakhonov (red card) 79'; T.Bikatal (yellow card); R.Azizov (yellow card) | Report | Partsvania 85'; M.Dzhalilov (yellow card); Soirov (yellow card); Davronov (yellow card) | Stadium: Tsentralnyi Stadium; Attendance: 7,000; Referee: Sayyodjon Zayniddinov |

| 16 May 2022 7 | Istiklol | 1–1 | Khujand | Dushanbe |
| 17:00 (UTC+5) | M.Dzhalilov 81'; Chicherin (yellow card); Mabatshoev (yellow card) | Report | Ergashev 26'; S.Tskanyan (yellow card); Kirgizboev (yellow card); F.Abdusalimov (yellow card); D.Edgorov (yellow card) | Stadium: Pamir Stadium; Attendance: 2,700; Referee: Sayvali Turdiev |

| 22 May 2022 8 | Istiklol | 3–1 | Regar-TadAZ | Hisor |
| 17:00 (UTC+5) | M.Dzhalilov 11' (pen.); Soirov 44'; Mabatshoev 71' (yellow card) | Report | Fatkhulloyev 20' | Stadium: Central Stadium; Attendance: 200; Referee: Amirjon Khorkashev |
Note: Match played at the Central Stadium in Hisor, instead of Istiklol's regular Pamir Stadium in Dushanbe.

| 21 June 2022 9 | Ravshan Zafarobod | 0–4 | Istiklol | Khujand |
| 17:30 (UTC+5) | J.Gaibullaev (yellow card); Rajabov (yellow card) | Report | Mabatshoev 13'; Karomatullozoda 45+1' (yellow card); Rajabov 64' (o.g.); Soirov 68'; Kasmynin (yellow card) | Stadium: 20 Years of Independence Stadium; Attendance: 2,000; Referee: Abdullo Davlatov |
Note: Match originally scheduled for 27 May 2022.

| 26 June 2022 10 | Istiklol | 7–0 | Ravshan Zafarobod | Hisor |
| 18:30 (UTC+5) | Soirov 21' (pen.); S.Kovussho 48'; Mabatshoev 57', 85'; M.Dzhalilov 62', 72'; Davronov 90+2'; Chicherin (yellow card); Kasmynin (yellow card) | Report | | Stadium: Central Stadium; Referee: Sayvali Turdiev |
Note: Match played at the Central Stadium in Hisor, instead of Istiklol's regular Pamir Stadium in Dushanbe.

| 3 July 2022 11 | Regar-TadAZ | 1–3 | Istiklol | Tursunzoda |
| 17:30 (UTC+5) | Fatkhulloyev 28' (pen.); S.Prokhorov (yellow card); S.Elmurodov (yellow card) | Report | Mabatshoev 13'; Rakhimov 61' (yellow card); Zoirov 88'; Davronov (yellow card); Karomatullozoda (yellow card); M.Dzhalilov (yellow card) | Stadium: TALCO Arena; Attendance: 1,200; Referee: Nasrullo Kabirov |

| 10 August 2022 12 | Khujand | 1–2 | Istiklol | Khujand |
| 17:00 (UTC+5) | Ergashev 66'; S.Ochilov (yellow card); E.Boboev (yellow card); F.Abdusalimov (yellow card); P.Bokiev (yellow card) | Report | Dzhalilov (penalty missed) 40' 40'; Ritacco 53' (yellow card); Kasmynin (red card) 84'; Mabatshoev (yellow card) (yellow-red card) 89'; Rakhimov (yellow card); Nazarov (yellow card) | Stadium: 20 Years of Independence Stadium; Attendance: 2,100; Referee: Gulmurodi Sadullo |

| 17 August 2022 1 | Istiklol | 0–1 | CSKA Pamir Dushanbe | Dushanbe |
| 18:30 (UTC+5) | Partsvania (yellow card); Karomatullozoda (yellow card) | Report | N.Rustamov (yellow card) (yellow-red card) 60'; K.Abdulloev 79'; I.Ruziev (yellow card) | Stadium: Pamir Stadium; Referee: Amirjon Khorkashev |
Note: Match originally scheduled for 2 April, but postponed due to Istiklol's participation in the 2022 AFC Champions League.

| 21 August 2022 13 | Istiklol | 1–0 | Khatlon | Dushanbe |
| 18:30 (UTC+5) | Rakhimov 29'; I.Aminu (yellow card); Partsvania (yellow card) | Report | J.Gaten (yellow card); R.Azizov (yellow card) | Stadium: Pamir Stadium; Attendance: 1,500; Referee: Abdullah Davlatov |

| 24 August 2022 2 | Ravshan Kulob | 0–0 | Istiklol | Kulab |
| 17:00 (UTC+5) | P.Artur (yellow card); Kalandarov (yellow card) | Report | Kasmynin (yellow card); Sulaymonov (yellow card) | Stadium: Central Stadium; Attendance: 7,300; Referee: Nasrullo Kabirov |
Note: Match originally scheduled for 8 April, but postponed due to Istiklol's participation in the 2022 AFC Champions League.

| 31 August 2022 3 | Istiklol | 3–0 | Istaravshan | Dushanbe |
| 18:30 (UTC+5) | Mabatshoev 48', 62', 90+3'; Partsvania (yellow card); Karomatullozoda (yellow card) | Report | O.Akhmatov (yellow card); A.Safarov (yellow card) | Stadium: Pamir Stadium; Attendance: 1,000; Referee: Sayodjon Zainiddinov |
Note: Match originally scheduled for 16 April, but postponed due to Istiklol's participation in the 2022 AFC Champions League.

| 4 September 2022 14 | Fayzkand | 1–3 | Istiklol | Hulbuk |
| 16:00 (UTC+5) | A.Andalibov 17' (yellow card); B.Sulaymonov (yellow card) | Report | Mabatshoev 35'; Dzhalilov 35', 86'; Kasmynin (yellow card); Davlatmir (yellow card) | Stadium: Central Stadium; Attendance: 400; Referee: Amirjon Horkashev |

| 11 September 2022 15 | Istiklol | 2–0 | Eskhata Khujand | Dushanbe |
| 18:00 (UTC+5) | Dzhalilov 68' (pen.) (red card) 72'; Mabatshoev 90+6'; Yatimov (yellow card); Sulaymonov (yellow card) | Report | D.Karimov (red card) 72'; Abdugafforov (yellow card); V.Shevchenko (yellow card); O.Karimov (yellow card); R.Khibaba (yellow card) | Stadium: Pamir Stadium; Attendance: 350; Referee: Rustam Nurmatov |

| 2 October 2022 16 | Istaravshan | 1–1 | Istiklol | Istaravshan |
| 15:30 (UTC+5) | A.Safarov 55'; K.Ziyoev (yellow card) | Report | Ritacco 90+2' (yellow card); Partsvania (yellow card); Rakhimov (yellow card) | Stadium: Istaravshan-Arena; Attendance: 8,000; Referee: Abdullah Davlatov |

| 5 October 2022 4 | Eskhata Khujand | 1–1 | Istiklol | Khujand |
| 15:30 (UTC+5) | D.Bozorov 51' (yellow card); D.Karimov (yellow card); M.Muminov (yellow card); S.Mamurjonov (yellow card); S.Khakimov (yellow card) | Report | Dzhalilov 35'; Imomnazarov (yellow card); Karomatullozoda (yellow card); S.Kovussho (yellow card) | Stadium: 20 Years of Independence Stadium; Attendance: 2,000; Referee: Bakhtiyor Komilov |
Note: Match originally scheduled for 23 April 2022, but postponed due to Istiklol's participation in the 2022 AFC Champions League.

| 10 October 2022 17 | Istiklol | 2–0 | Ravshan Kulob | Dushanbe |
| 18:00 (UTC+5) | Ritacco 32'; Kasmynin 51'; Partsvania (yellow card) | Report | R.Dior (yellow card); M.Azizboev (yellow card) | Stadium: Pamir Stadium; Attendance: 1,500; Referee: Sayvali Turdiev |

| 19 October 2022 5 | Istiklol | 3–1 | Fayzkand | Dushanbe |
| 15:00 (UTC+5) | Dzhalilov 55', 84'; Ritacco 68'; Rakhimov (red card) 81'; Hrachov (yellow card); S.Kovussho (yellow card); Imomnazarov (yellow card) | Report | S.Hotam 19'; A.Bougnon (red card) 81'; J.Feumba (red card) 81'; M.Milikshoev (yellow card) | Stadium: Pamir Stadium; Referee: Abdullah Davlatov |
Note: Match originally scheduled for 30 April 2022, but postponed due to Istiklol's participation in the 2022 AFC Champions League.

| 23 October 2022 18 | CSKA Pamir Dushanbe | 1–1 | Istiklol | Dushanbe |
| 15:00 (UTC+5) | I.Ruziev 30' (yellow card); A.Jurazoda (yellow card) | Report | Dzhalilov 62' (pen.); I.Aminu (yellow card) | Stadium: CSKA Stadium; Referee: Behruz Murtazoev |

===== League table =====
| Pos | Team | Pld | W | D | L | GF | GA | GD | Pts | Qualification or relegation |
|---|---|---|---|---|---|---|---|---|---|---|
| 1 | Istiklol | 18 | 11 | 6 | 1 | 38 | 11 | +27 | 39 | Qualification for Championship round |
| 2 | Khatlon | 18 | 7 | 7 | 4 | 16 | 11 | +5 | 28 | Qualification for Championship round |
| 3 | Ravshan Kulob | 18 | 7 | 7 | 4 | 19 | 16 | +3 | 28 | Qualification for Championship round |
| 4 | Khujand | 18 | 7 | 6 | 5 | 21 | 13 | +8 | 27 | Qualification for Championship round |
| 5 | CSKA Pamir | 18 | 7 | 4 | 7 | 22 | 24 | −2 | 25 | Qualification for Championship round |

Updated to match(es) played on 23 October 2022. Source: Soccerway
Rules for classification: 1) Points; 2) Head-to-head points; 3) Head-to-head goal difference; 4) Head-to-head goals scored; 5) Goal difference; 6) Goals scored.

==== Championship round ====
===== Results summary =====
| Overall | | | | | | | | Home | | | | | | Away | | | | | |
| Pld | W | D | L | GF | GA | GD | Pts | W | D | L | GF | GA | GD | W | D | L | GF | GA | GD |
|---|---|---|---|---|---|---|---|---|---|---|---|---|---|---|---|---|---|---|---|
| 4 | 3 | 0 | 1 | 8 | 2 | +6 | 9 | 2 | 0 | 0 | 3 | 0 | +3 | 1 | 0 | 1 | 5 | 2 | +3 |

Last updated: 27 November 2022.
Source: See Results

===== Results by round =====
| Round | 1 | 2 | 3 | 4 |
|---|---|---|---|---|
| Ground | H | A | H | A |
| Result | W | L | W | W |
| Position | 1 | 1 | 1 | 1 |

Source: Results
A = Away; H = Home; W = Win; D = Draw; L = Loss

===== Results =====
| 4 November 2022 19 | Istiklol | 1–0 | Khatlon | Dushanbe |
| 15:00 (UTC+5) | Karomatullozoda 90+2' (yellow card); Kasmynin (yellow card); Nazarov (yellow card) | Report | T.Bikatal (red card) 62'; R.Azizov (yellow card) | Stadium: Pamir Stadium; Referee: Gulmurad Sadulla |

| 9 November 2022 20 | Ravshan Kulob | 1–0 | Istiklol | Kulab |
| 14:30 (UTC+5) | A.Nozimov 8' | Report | | Stadium: Central Stadium |

| 23 November 2022 21 | Istiklol | 2–0 | Khujand | Dushanbe |
| 14:00 (UTC+5) | Dzhalilov 49'; Mabatshoev 50'; S.Kovussho (yellow card); Kasmynin (yellow card) | Report | S.Garanzha (red card) 28'; Ergashev (yellow card) | Stadium: Pamir Stadium; Attendance: 300; Referee: Ravshan Ishmatov |

| 27 November 2022 22 | CSKA Pamir Dushanbe | 1–5 | Istiklol | Dushanbe |
| 14:00 (UTC+5) | A.Mongbet 74' | Report | Dzhalilov 43' (pen.), 76', 87'; Mabatshoev 46'; Davlatmir 78' | Stadium: CSKA Stadium; Attendance: Bakhtiyor Komilov; Referee: 200 |

==== League table ====
| Pos | Team | Pld | W | D | L | GF | GA | GD | Pts | Qualification or relegation |
|---|---|---|---|---|---|---|---|---|---|---|
| 1 | Istiklol (C) | 22 | 14 | 6 | 2 | 46 | 13 | +33 | 48 | Qualification for AFC Champions League group stage |
| 2 | Ravshan Kulob | 22 | 9 | 8 | 5 | 25 | 22 | +3 | 35 | Qualification for AFC Cup group stage |
| 3 | Khujand | 22 | 9 | 7 | 6 | 29 | 18 | +11 | 34 | Qualification for AFC Cup play-off round |
| 4 | Khatlon | 22 | 9 | 7 | 6 | 23 | 17 | +6 | 34 | |
| 5 | CSKA Pamir | 22 | 7 | 4 | 11 | 30 | 34 | −4 | 25 | |

Updated to match(es) played on 27 November 2022. Source: Soccerway
Rules for classification: 1) Points; 2) Head-to-head points; 3) Head-to-head goal difference; 4) Head-to-head goals scored; 5) Goal difference; 6) Goals scored.
(C) Champions

=== Tajikistan Cup ===
| 6 August 2022 Last 16 | Istiklol | 6–0 | Mohir | Hisor |
| 18:30 (UTC+5) | Dzhalilov 13', 33', 74'; Mabatshoev 29', 61'; Sulaymonov 78' | Report | M.Sherzoda (yellow card) | Stadium: Central Stadium; Attendance: 200; Referee: Bakhtiyor Komilov |

| 28 August 2022 Quarterfinal | Istiklol | 1–0 | Ravshan Kulob | Dushanbe |
| 18:30 (UTC+5) | Dzhalilov 15'; Rakhimov (yellow card); Karomatullozoda (yellow card); I.Aminu (yellow card); Yatimov (yellow card) | Report | S.Naimov (yellow card) (yellow-red card) 45'; R.Paizov (yellow card); Jalilov (yellow card); R.Dior (yellow card); C.Kakou (yellow card) | Stadium: Pamir Stadium; Attendance: 2,500; Referee: Bekhruz Murtazoev |

| 15 September 2022 Semifinal 1st leg | Istiklol | 1–0 | Eskhata | Hisor |
| 20:00 (UTC+5) | Imomnazarov 78'; Hrachov (yellow card) | Report | I.Eshonkhonov (yellow card); A.Uzokov (yellow card); Abdugafforov (yellow card) | Stadium: Central Stadium; Referee: Sayodjon Zainiddinov |

| 15 October 2022 Semifinal 2nd leg | Eskhata | 1–1 (1–2 agg.) | Istiklol | Khujand |
| 17:00 (UTC+5) | D.Bozorov 77' (yellow card); S.Mamurjonov (red card) 87'; S.Rihsiboev (yellow card) | Report | O.Karimov 55' (o.g.); Mabatshoev (yellow card) (red card) 87'; Hrachov (yellow card); Asrorov (yellow card); I.Aminu (yellow card); S.Kovussho (yellow card); Karomatullozoda (yellow card); Yatimov (yellow card) | Stadium: 20 Years of Independence Stadium; Attendance: 1,500; Referee: Yusuf Ishmatov |

==== Final ====
| 29 October 2022 Final | Istiklol | 2–2 (a.e.t.) (5–4 p) | Kuktosh Rudaki | Bokhtar |
| (UTC+5) | Sobirov 38' (o.g.); Dzhalilov 72'; Sulaymonov (yellow card); Kasmynin (yellow card); Asrorov (yellow card); Hrachov (yellow card); Karomatullozoda (yellow card) | Report | Gulaev 3'; Uzokov 61' (yellow card); Giyosov (yellow card); Karaev (yellow card) | Stadium: Pakhtakor Stadium; Attendance: 6,500; Referee: Sayvali Turdiev |
| | Penalties |
| | Asrorov (penalty scored); Mabatshoev (penalty missed); Sulaymonov (penalty scored); Ritacco (penalty scored); M.Dzhalilov (penalty scored); Hrachov (penalty scored) | | (penalty scored) Uzokov; (penalty missed) Sobirov; (penalty scored) Shukurov; (penalty scored) Sultonov; (penalty scored) Karaev; (penalty scored) Gulaev |

=== AFC Champions League ===
==== Group stage ====
| Pos | Team | Pld | W | D | L | GF | GA | GD | Pts | Qualification |
|---|---|---|---|---|---|---|---|---|---|---|
| 1 | (Saudi Arabia) Al-Hilal (H) | 6 | 4 | 1 | 1 | 11 | 5 | +6 | 13 (Note: Equal on head-to-head points. Head-to-head goal difference: Al-Hilal +1, Al-Rayyan –1.) | Advance to Round of 16 |
| 2 | (Qatar) Al-Rayyan | 6 | 4 | 1 | 1 | 10 | 7 | +3 | 13 | Advance to Round of 16 |
| 3 | (United Arab Emirates) Sharjah | 6 | 1 | 2 | 3 | 7 | 11 | −4 | 5 | |
| 4 | (Tajikistan) Istiklol | 6 | 1 | 0 | 5 | 5 | 10 | −5 | 3 | |

Source: AFC
Rules for classification: Tiebreakers
(H) Hosts
Notes:

| 8 April 2022 1 | Istiklol (Tajikistan) | 2–3 | (Qatar) Al-Rayyan | Riyadh, Saudi Arabia |
| 22:15 (UTC+5) | Sulaymonov 3'; Mabatshoev (yellow card) 41'; M.Isaev (yellow card) 50' (goal) 67'; Davronov (yellow card) 87' | Report | Brahimi 8'; Boli 44', 71'; M.Abouelela (yellow card) 77' | Stadium: King Fahd International Stadium; Referee: Yusuke Araki (Japan) |

| 12 April 2022 2 | Sharjah (United Arab Emirates) | 2–1 | (Tajikistan) Istiklol | Riyadh, Saudi Arabia |
| 01:15 (UTC+5) | Caio (yellow card) 33' (goal) 54'; Bernard 57'; Suroor (yellow card) 58'; Ibrahim (yellow card) 82' (yellow-red card) 85' | Report | M.Dzhalilov 29'; Rakhimov (yellow card) 69' | Stadium: King Fahd International Stadium; Referee: Aziz Asymov (Uzbekistan) |

| 16 April 2022 3 | Al-Hilal (Saudi Arabia) | 1–0 | (Tajikistan) Istiklol | Riyadh, Saudi Arabia |
| 01:15 (UTC+5) | Al-Faraj 52' | Report | Rakhimov (yellow card) 63'; D.Imomnazarov (yellow card) 90+3' | Stadium: Prince Faisal bin Fahd Stadium; Referee: Ahmed Al-Kaf (Oman) |

| 20 April 2022 4 | Istiklol (Tajikistan) | 0–3 | (Saudi Arabia) Al-Hilal | Riyadh, Saudi Arabia |
| 01:15 (UTC+5) | | Report | Ighalo 8', 33'; S.Al-Dawsari (yellow card) 18' (goal) 90+2' | Stadium: Prince Faisal bin Fahd Stadium; Referee: Hanna Hattab (Syria) |

| 23 April 2022 5 | Al-Rayyan (Qatar) | 1–0 | (Tajikistan) Istiklol | Riyadh, Saudi Arabia |
| 23:15 (UTC+5) | Has.Ali (yellow card) 45+1'; Yasser (yellow card) 85'; Boli 90' | Report | Davronov (yellow card) 14'; Kasmynin (yellow card) 50'; Bocoum (yellow card) 85' | Stadium: King Fahd International Stadium; Referee: Kim Hee-gon (South Korea) |

| 28 April 2022 6 | Istiklol (Tajikistan) | 2–0 | (United Arab Emirates) Sharjah | Riyadh, Saudi Arabia |
| 01:15 (UTC+5) | M.Isaev (yellow card) 1'; Bocoum 14'; Kasmynin (yellow card) 48' (goal) 90+1' | Report | Meloni (yellow card) 42' (yellow-red card) 90+4'; Kazim (yellow card) 85' | Stadium: King Fahd International Stadium; Referee: Mohd Amirul Izwan Yaacob (Malaysia) |

== Squad statistics ==
As of match played 27 November 2022

=== Appearances and goals ===
| No. | Pos | Nat | Player | Total | | Tajikistan Higher League | | Tajikistan Cup | | Super Cup | | AFC Champions League | |
| No. | Pos | Nat | Player | Apps | Goals | Apps | Goals | Apps | Goals | Apps | Goals | Apps | Goals |
|---|---|---|---|---|---|---|---|---|---|---|---|---|---|
| 1 | GK | (Tajikistan) TJK | Rustam Yatimov | 29 | 0 | 18 | 0 | 5 | 0 | 1 | 0 | 5 | 0 |
| 2 | DF | (Tajikistan) TJK | Siyovush Asrorov | 19 | 0 | 14 | 0 | 5 | 0 | 0 | 0 | 0 | 0 |
| 3 | DF | (Tajikistan) TJK | Tabrezi Davlatmir | 12 | 1 | 9 | 1 | 2+1 | 0 | 0 | 0 | 0 | 0 |
| 4 | DF | (Ukraine) UKR | Temur Partsvania | 18 | 1 | 14 | 1 | 3 | 0 | 0 | 0 | 1 | 0 |
| 5 | MF | (Tajikistan) TJK | Rustam Kamolov | 5 | 0 | 5 | 0 | 0 | 0 | 0 | 0 | 0 | 0 |
| 7 | MF | (Tajikistan) TJK | Mukhammadzhon Rakhimov | 31 | 2 | 21 | 2 | 4 | 0 | 1 | 0 | 5 | 0 |
| 10 | MF | (Argentina) ARG | Gonzalo Ritacco | 15 | 4 | 12 | 4 | 3 | 0 | 0 | 0 | 0 | 0 |
| 11 | FW | (Tajikistan) TJK | Shervoni Mabatshoev | 31 | 14 | 19 | 12 | 5 | 2 | 1 | 0 | 6 | 0 |
| 14 | DF | (Tajikistan) TJK | Sayedi Kovussho | 25 | 1 | 19 | 1 | 3+2 | 0 | 0+1 | 0 | 0 | 0 |
| 15 | MF | (Ghana) GHA | Idriss Aminu | 15 | 0 | 10 | 0 | 5 | 0 | 0 | 0 | 0 | 0 |
| 17 | DF | (Belarus) BLR | Uladzislaw Kasmynin | 27 | 2 | 16 | 1 | 4+1 | 0 | 1 | 0 | 5 | 1 |
| 19 | DF | (Tajikistan) TJK | Akhtam Nazarov | 28 | 0 | 22 | 0 | 2+1 | 0 | 0+1 | 0 | 1+1 | 0 |
| 20 | FW | (Tajikistan) TJK | Shukhratdzhon Shonazarov | 5 | 0 | 5 | 0 | 0 | 0 | 0 | 0 | 0 | 0 |
| 22 | MF | (Tajikistan) TJK | Parviz Baki-Akhunov | 7 | 0 | 4 | 0 | 1+2 | 0 | 0 | 0 | 0 | 0 |
| 23 | DF | (Tajikistan) TJK | Alidzhon Karomatullozoda | 25 | 2 | 18 | 2 | 2+2 | 0 | 0+1 | 0 | 0+2 | 0 |
| 27 | DF | (Tajikistan) TJK | Daler Imomnazarov | 27 | 1 | 18 | 0 | 1+3 | 1 | 1 | 0 | 3+1 | 0 |
| 50 | GK | (Tajikistan) TJK | Mukhriddin Khasanov | 7 | 0 | 5 | 0 | 0 | 0 | 0 | 0 | 1+1 | 0 |
| 51 | DF | (Ukraine) UKR | Hlib Hrachov | 17 | 0 | 12 | 0 | 4+1 | 0 | 0 | 0 | 0 | 0 |
| 63 | FW | (Tajikistan) TJK | Manuchekhr Dzhalilov | 30 | 22 | 19 | 16 | 4 | 5 | 1 | 0 | 6 | 1 |
| 70 | MF | (Tajikistan) TJK | Shahrom Sulaymonov | 33 | 2 | 22 | 0 | 2+2 | 1 | 1 | 0 | 6 | 1 |
| 28 | DF | (Tajikistan) TJK | Mukhammad Mukhammadzoda | 5 | 0 | 2 | 0 | 0+1 | 0 | 0 | 0 | 1+1 | 0 |
| | MF | (Tajikistan) TJK | Saydali Ibragimov | 5 | 0 | 5 | 0 | 0 | 0 | 0 | 0 | 0 | 0 |
Youth team players:
Players away from Istiklol on loan:
Players who left Istiklol during the season:
| 5 | DF | (Tajikistan) TJK | Iskandar Dzhalilov | 9 | 0 | 2 | 0 | 0 | 0 | 1 | 0 | 5+1 | 0 |
| 8 | MF | (Tajikistan) TJK | Nuriddin Davronov | 11 | 1 | 5 | 1 | 0 | 0 | 1 | 0 | 5 | 0 |
| 9 | FW | (Tajikistan) TJK | Rustam Soirov | 12 | 4 | 5 | 3 | 0 | 0 | 0+1 | 1 | 1+5 | 0 |
| 44 | DF | (Russia) RUS | Nikita Chicherin | 12 | 0 | 5 | 0 | 0 | 0 | 1 | 0 | 6 | 0 |
| 77 | MF | (Uzbekistan) UZB | Mukhammad Isaev | 10 | 1 | 4 | 0 | 0 | 0 | 0 | 0 | 5+1 | 1 |
| 84 | MF | (Tajikistan) TJK | Islom Zoirov | 13 | 1 | 7 | 1 | 0 | 0 | 0+1 | 0 | 1+4 | 0 |
| 90 | FW | (Gabon) GAB | Eric Bocoum | 8 | 1 | 1 | 0 | 0 | 0 | 1 | 0 | 4+2 | 1 |

=== Goal scorers ===
| Place | Position | Nation | Number | Name | Tajikistan Higher League | Tajikistan Cup | Super Cup | AFC Champions League | Total |
|---|---|---|---|---|---|---|---|---|---|
| 1 | FW | (Tajikistan) | 63 | Manuchekhr Dzhalilov | 16 | 5 | 0 | 1 | 22 |
| 2 | FW | (Tajikistan) | 11 | Shervoni Mabatshoev | 12 | 2 | 0 | 0 | 14 |
| 4 | MF | (Argentina) | 10 | Gonzalo Ritacco | 4 | 0 | 0 | 0 | 4 |
| 4 | FW | (Tajikistan) | 9 | Rustam Soirov | 3 | 0 | 1 | 0 | 4 |
| 5 | | | | Own goal | 1 | 2 | 0 | 0 | 3 |
| 6 | MF | (Tajikistan) | 7 | Mukhammadzhon Rakhimov | 2 | 0 | 0 | 0 | 2 |
| 6 | DF | (Tajikistan) | 23 | Alidzhon Karomatullozoda | 2 | 0 | 0 | 0 | 2 |
| 6 | DF | (Belarus) | 17 | Uladzislaw Kasmynin | 1 | 0 | 0 | 1 | 2 |
| 6 | MF | (Tajikistan) | 70 | Shahrom Sulaymonov | 0 | 1 | 0 | 1 | 2 |
| 10 | DF | (Ukraine) | 4 | Temur Partsvania | 1 | 0 | 0 | 0 | 1 |
| 10 | DF | (Tajikistan) | 14 | Sayedi Kovussho | 1 | 0 | 0 | 0 | 1 |
| 10 | MF | (Tajikistan) | 8 | Nuriddin Davronov | 1 | 0 | 0 | 0 | 1 |
| 10 | MF | (Tajikistan) | 84 | Islom Zoirov | 1 | 0 | 0 | 0 | 1 |
| 10 | DF | (Tajikistan) | 3 | Tabrezi Davlatmir | 1 | 0 | 0 | 0 | 1 |
| 10 | DF | (Tajikistan) | 27 | Daler Imomnazarov | 0 | 1 | 0 | 0 | 1 |
| 10 | MF | (Uzbekistan) | 77 | Mukhammad Isaev | 0 | 0 | 0 | 1 | 1 |
| 10 | FW | (Gabon) | 90 | Eric Bocoum | 0 | 0 | 0 | 1 | 1 |
| TOTALS | | | | | 46 | 11 | 1 | 5 | 63 |

=== Clean sheets ===
| Place | Position | Nation | Number | Name | Tajikistan Higher League | Tajikistan Cup | Super Cup | AFC Champions League | Total |
|---|---|---|---|---|---|---|---|---|---|
| 1 | GK | (Tajikistan) | 1 | Rustam Yatimov | 7 | 3 | 1 | 1 | 12 |
| 2 | GK | (Tajikistan) | 50 | Mukhriddin Khasanov | 3 | 0 | 0 | 0 | 3 |
| TOTALS | | | | | 9 | 3 | 1 | 1 | 14 |

Yatimov & Khasanov both played in Istiklol 4–0 victory over Ravshan Zafarobod on 21 June 2022

=== Disciplinary record ===
| Number | Nation | Position | Name | Tajikistan Higher League | | Tajikistan Cup | | Super Cup | | AFC Champions League | | Total | |
| Number | Nation | Position | Name | Booked | Sent off (straight red) | Booked | Sent off (straight red) | Booked | Sent off (straight red) | Booked | Sent off (straight red) | Booked | Sent off (straight red) |
| 1 | (Tajikistan) | GK | Rustam Yatimov | 1 | 0 | 2 | 0 | 1 | 0 | 0 | 0 | 4 | 0 |
| 2 | (Tajikistan) | DF | Siyovush Asrorov | 0 | 0 | 2 | 0 | 0 | 0 | 0 | 0 | 2 | 0 |
| 3 | (Tajikistan) | DF | Tabrezi Davlatmir | 2 | 0 | 0 | 0 | 0 | 0 | 0 | 0 | 2 | 0 |
| 4 | (Ukraine) | DF | Temur Partsvania | 4 | 0 | 0 | 0 | 0 | 0 | 0 | 0 | 4 | 0 |
| 7 | (Tajikistan) | MF | Mukhammadzhon Rakhimov | 3 | 1 | 1 | 0 | 0 | 0 | 2 | 0 | 6 | 1 |
| 10 | (Argentina) | MF | Gonzalo Ritacco | 2 | 0 | 0 | 0 | 0 | 0 | 0 | 0 | 2 | 0 |
| 11 | (Tajikistan) | FW | Shervoni Mabatshoev | 4 | 1 | 1 | 1 | 0 | 0 | 1 | 0 | 6 | 2 |
| 14 | (Tajikistan) | DF | Sayedi Kovussho | 3 | 0 | 1 | 0 | 0 | 0 | 0 | 0 | 4 | 0 |
| 15 | (Ghana) | MF | Idriss Aminu | 2 | 0 | 2 | 0 | 0 | 0 | 0 | 0 | 4 | 0 |
| 17 | (Belarus) | DF | Uladzislaw Kasmynin | 6 | 1 | 1 | 0 | 0 | 0 | 2 | 0 | 9 | 1 |
| 19 | (Tajikistan) | DF | Akhtam Nazarov | 2 | 0 | 0 | 0 | 0 | 0 | 0 | 0 | 2 | 0 |
| 23 | (Tajikistan) | DF | Alidzhon Karomatullozoda | 6 | 0 | 3 | 0 | 0 | 0 | 0 | 0 | 9 | 0 |
| 27 | (Tajikistan) | DF | Daler Imomnazarov | 2 | 0 | 0 | 0 | 0 | 0 | 1 | 0 | 3 | 0 |
| 51 | (Ukraine) | DF | Hlib Hrachov | 1 | 0 | 3 | 0 | 0 | 0 | 0 | 0 | 4 | 0 |
| 63 | (Tajikistan) | FW | Manuchekhr Dzhalilov | 2 | 1 | 0 | 0 | 0 | 0 | 0 | 0 | 2 | 1 |
| 70 | (Tajikistan) | MF | Shahrom Sulaymonov | 2 | 0 | 1 | 0 | 0 | 0 | 0 | 0 | 3 | 0 |
Players who left Istiklol during the season:
| 8 | (Tajikistan) | MF | Nuriddin Davronov | 2 | 0 | 0 | 0 | 1 | 0 | 2 | 0 | 4 | 0 |
| 9 | (Tajikistan) | FW | Rustam Soirov | 1 | 0 | 0 | 0 | 0 | 0 | 0 | 0 | 1 | 0 |
| 44 | (Russia) | DF | Nikita Chicherin | 2 | 0 | 0 | 0 | 0 | 0 | 0 | 0 | 2 | 0 |
| 77 | (Uzbekistan) | MF | Mukhammad Isaev | 0 | 0 | 0 | 0 | 0 | 0 | 2 | 0 | 2 | 0 |
| 84 | (Tajikistan) | MF | Islom Zoirov | 0 | 0 | 0 | 0 | 1 | 0 | 0 | 0 | 1 | 0 |
| 90 | (Gabon) | FW | Eric Bocoum | 0 | 0 | 0 | 0 | 0 | 0 | 1 | 0 | 1 | 0 |
| | | | TOTALS | 47 | 3 | 17 | 1 | 3 | 0 | 11 | 0 | 78 | 4 |
