= Tajikistan national football team results (2020–present) =

This article provides details of international football games played by the Tajikistan national football team from 2020 to present.

== Results ==
Key
Win
Draw
Defeat

=== 2020 ===
3 September 2020 Friendly	Uzbekistan	2–1	Tajikistan	Tashkent, Uzbekistan
19:00 UTC+5	Ubaydullaev 33'; Kholmukhamedov 67' (pen.)	Report	Juraboev 48'	Stadium: Lokomotiv Stadium; Attendance: 0 Referee: Akhrol Riskullaev (Uzbekistan)

7 November 2020 Friendly	Bahrain	1–0	Tajikistan	Dubai, United Arab Emirates
19:30 UTC+4	Al Romaihi 44'	Report		Stadium: Police Officers' Club Stadium; Attendance: 0 Referee: Ahmed Eisa Darwish (United Arab Emirates)

12 November 2020 Friendly	United Arab Emirates	3–2	Tajikistan	Dubai, United Arab Emirates
18:00 UTC+4	Mabkhout 29', 63' (pen.); Saleh 90+4'	Report	Ergashev 10'; Tursunov 20'	Stadium: Zabeel Stadium; Attendance: 0 Referee: Ammar Ashkanani (Kuwait)

=== 2021 ===
1 February 2021 Friendly	Jordan	2–0	Tajikistan	Dubai, United Arab Emirates
--:-- UTC+4	Ersan 36' (pen.); Abu Zrayq 43'	Report		Stadium: Theyab Awana Stadium; Referee: Sultan Mohamed Al Hammadi (United Arab Emirates)

5 February 2021 Friendly	Jordan	0–1	Tajikistan	Dubai, United Arab Emirates
			Dzhalilov 79'	Stadium: Theyab Awana Stadium; Referee: Omar Mohamed Al Ali (United Arab Emirates)

25 March 2021 2022 World Cup qualification	Tajikistan	3–0	Mongolia	Dushanbe, Tajikistan
18:00 UTC+5	M. Dzhalilov 36'; A. Dzhalilov 50'; Samiyev 86'	Report		Stadium: Pamir Stadium; Referee: Ali Al Qaysi (Iraq)

24 May 2021 Friendly	Iraq	0–0	Tajikistan	Basra, Iraq
19:30 UTC+3		Report		Stadium: Al Fayhaa Stadium; Referee: Ismaeel Habib (Bahrain)

29 May 2021 Friendly	Thailand	2–2	Tajikistan	Sharjah, United Arab Emirates
19:45 UTC+3	Mueanta 54', 60'	Report	Panjshanbe 63'; Zoirov 89'	Stadium: Khalid bin Mohammed Stadium

7 June 2021 2022 World Cup qualification	Japan	4–1	Tajikistan	Suita, Japan
19:30 UTC+9	Furuhashi 6'; Minamino 40'; Hashimoto 51'; Kawabe 70'	Report	Panjshanbe 9'	Stadium: Panasonic Stadium; Referee: Abdulrehman Al Jassim (Qatar)

15 June 2021 2022 World Cup qualification	Tajikistan	4–0	Myanmar	Osaka, Japan
19:25 UTC+9	Tursunov 34'; Dzhalilov 53'; Boboev 78'; Samiev 87'	Report		Stadium: Yanmar Stadium Nagai; Referee: Omar Mohamed Al-Ali (United Arab Emirates)

16 November 2021 Friendly	Kazakhstan	1–0	Tajikistan	Nur-Sultan, Kazakhstan
19:00 UTC+6	Zaynutdinov 13'	Report		Stadium: Astana Arena; Referee: Amine Kourgheli (Belarus)

=== 2022 ===
25 March 2022 Navruz Cup	Uganda	1–1 (5–4 p)	Tajikistan	Namangan, Uzbekistan
16:30 UTC+6	Okwi 7'	Report	A. Dzhalilov 39'	Stadium: Markaziy Stadium; Referee: R. Lutfullin
	Penalties
	Kyambadde (penalty scored); Lwaliwa (penalty scored); Kakooza (penalty scored); Mato (penalty scored); Okello (penalty missed); Bayo (penalty scored)		(penalty scored) Umarbayev; (penalty missed) Ayni; (penalty scored) Nazarov; (penalty scored) Ergashev; (penalty scored) Soirov; (penalty missed) Z. Dzhuraboyev

29 March 2022 Navruz Cup	Kyrgyzstan	0–1	Tajikistan	Namangan, Uzbekistan
17:00 UTC+6		Report	Umarbayev 54'	Stadium: Markaziy Stadium; Referee: R. Lutfullin

1 June 2022 Friendly	Syria	1–0	Tajikistan	Dubai, United Arab Emirates
20:00 UTC+6	Al Somah 16'	Report		Stadium: Shabab Al Ahli Stadium

8 June 2022 2023 Asian Cup qualification	Tajikistan	4–0	Myanmar	Bishkek, Kyrgyzstan
16:30 UTC+6	Mabatshoev 9', 57'; Dzhalilov 56' (pen.); Panjshanbe 84'	Report		Stadium: Dolen Omurzakov Stadium; Attendance: 50; Referee: Ammar Mahfoodh (Bahrain)

11 June 2022 2023 Asian Cup qualification	Singapore	0–1	Tajikistan	Bishkek, Kyrgyzstan
16:30 UTC+6		Report	Mabatshoev 53'	Stadium: Dolen Omurzakov Stadium; Attendance: 84; Referee: Mohammad Ghabayen (Jordan)

14 June 2022 2023 Asian Cup qualification	Kyrgyzstan	0–0	Tajikistan	Bishkek, Kyrgyzstan
21:00 UTC+6		Report		Stadium: Dolen Omurzakov Stadium; Attendance: 17,340; Referee: Ko Hyung-jin (South Korea)

22 September 2022 2022 King's Cup	Trinidad and Tobago	1–2	Tajikistan	Chiang Mai, Thailand
17:30 UTC+7	J. García 27'	Report	Rakhimov 47'; Panjshanbe 75'	Stadium: 700th Anniversary Stadium; Attendance: 7,288; Referee: Torphong Somsing (Thailand)

25 September 2022 2022 King's Cup	Tajikistan	0–0 (3–0 p)	Malaysia	Chiang Mai, Thailand
20:30 UTC+7		Report		Stadium: 700th Anniversary Stadium; Attendance: 488; Referee: Wiwat Jumpaoon (Thailand)
	Penalties
	Nazarov (penalty missed); Khanonov (penalty scored); Tursunov (penalty scored); Soirov (penalty scored)		(penalty missed) Cools; (penalty missed) Faiz; (penalty missed) Rasid

17 November 2022 Friendly	Tajikistan	0–0	Russia	Dushanbe, Tajikistan
20:00 UTC+05:00		Report		Stadium: Pamir Stadium; Referee: Ilgiz Tantashev (Uzbekistan)

=== 2023 ===
25 March 2023 Friendly	United Arab Emirates	0–0	Tajikistan	Abu Dhabi, United Arab Emirates
23:00 UTC+5		Report		Stadium: Al Nahyan Stadium; Referee: Ammar Ashkanani (Kuwait)

28 March 2023 Friendly	Kuwait	2–1	Tajikistan	Kuwait City, Kuwait
23:59 UTC+5	Al-Fadhel 9'; Al-Khaldi 61'	Report	A.Dzhalilov 90'	Stadium: Jaber Al-Ahmad International Stadium; Attendance: 1,000; Referee: Ahmed Abu Bakar Saeed Al Kaf (Oman)

11 June 2023 2023 CAFA Nations Cup	Tajikistan	1–1	Turkmenistan	Tashkent, Uzbekistan
18:30 UTC+5	Khamrokulov 86'	Report	Annaýew 57'	Stadium: Pakhtakor Central Stadium; Referee: Akhrol Riskullaev (Uzbekistan)

14 June 2023 2023 CAFA Nations Cup	Oman	1–1	Tajikistan	Tashkent, Uzbekistan
18:30 UTC+5	Al-Yahyaei 14' (pen.)	Report	Khanonov 45'	Stadium: Pakhtakor Central Stadium; Attendance: 150; Referee: Kirill Levnikov (Russia)

17 June 2023 2023 CAFA Nations Cup	Uzbekistan	5–1	Tajikistan	Tashkent, Uzbekistan
20:30 UTC+5	Yakhshiboev 53'; Shomurodov 56' (pen.); Fayzullaev 72'; Erkinov 83'; Urunov 90+6' (pen.)		Umarbayev 14'	Stadium: Milliy Stadium; Attendance: 9,099; Referee: Hassan Akrami (Iran)

8 September 2023 Friendly	Singapore	0–2	Tajikistan	Bishan, Singapore
16:30 UTC+5		Report	Rakhimov 6'; Khanonov 90+6'	Stadium: Bishan Stadium; Attendance: 2,211; Referee: Thoriq Alkatiri (Indonesia)

17 October 2023 2023 Merdeka Tournament	Malaysia	0–2	Tajikistan	Kuala Lumpur, Malaysia
18:00 UTC+5		Report	Soirov 44'; Samiev 88'	Stadium: Bukit Jalil National Stadium; Attendance: 36,558; Referee: Hoàng Ngọc Hà (Vietnam)

16 November 2023 2026 WCQ / 2027 ACQ	Tajikistan	1–1	Jordan	Dushanbe, Tajikistan
18:00 UTC+5	Samiev 89'	Report	Al-Naimat 90+3'	Stadium: Pamir Stadium; Referee: Ali Sabah (Iraq)

21 November 2023 2026 WCQ / 2027 ACQ	Pakistan	1–6	Tajikistan	Islamabad, Pakistan
14:00 UTC+5	Nabi 21'	Report	Kamolov 9', 65'; Soirov 13'; Umarbayev 27'; Panjshanbe 45'; Samiev 90'	Stadium: Jinnah Sports Stadium; Attendance: 18,316; Referee: Yusuke Araki (Japan)

=== 2024 ===
4 January Unofficial Friendly	Hong Kong	1–2	Tajikistan	Abu Dhabi, United Arab Emirates
17:00 UTC+5	Camargo 33'	Report	Soirov 25'; Samiev 51'	Stadium: Zayed Cricket Training Centre; Attendance: 0

13 January 2023 AFC Asian Cup GS	China	0–0	Tajikistan	Doha, Qatar
19:30 UTC+5		Report		Stadium: Abdullah bin Khalifa Stadium; Attendance: 4,001; Referee: Mohammed Al Hoaish (Saudi Arabia)

17 January 2023 AFC Asian Cup GS	Tajikistan	0–1	Qatar	Al Khor, Qatar
19:30 UTC+5		Report	Afif 17'	Stadium: Al Bayt Stadium; Referee: Hiroyuki Kimura (Japan)

22 January 2023 AFC Asian Cup GS	Tajikistan	2–1	Lebanon	Al Rayyan, Qatar
20:00 UTC+5	Umarbayev 80'; Khamrokulov 90+1'	Report	Jradi 47'	Stadium: Jassim bin Hamad Stadium; Referee: Mohanad Qasim Sarray (Iraq)

28 January 2023 AFC Asian Cup R16	Tajikistan	1–1 (a.e.t.) (5–3 p)	United Arab Emirates	Al Rayyan, Qatar
21:00 UTC+5	Hanonov 30'	Report	Al Hammadi 90+5'	Stadium: Ahmad bin Ali Stadium; Attendance: 33,584; Referee: Yusuke Araki (Japan)
	Penalties
	Nazarov (penalty scored); Khanonov (penalty scored); Panjshanbe (penalty scored); Soirov (penalty scored); Shukurov (penalty scored)		(penalty scored) Idrees; (penalty missed) Caio; (penalty scored) Lima; (penalty scored) Saleh

2 February 2023 AFC Asian Cup QF	Tajikistan	0–1	Jordan	Al Rayyan, Qatar
				Stadium: Ahmad bin Ali Stadium; Referee: Fu Ming (China)

21 March 2026 WCQ / 2027 ACQ	Saudi Arabia	1–0	Tajikistan	Riyadh, Saudi Arabia
22:00 UTC+3	Al-Dawsari 23'	Report		Stadium: King Saud University Stadium; Attendance: 18,756; Referee: Muhammad Taqi (Singapore)

26 March 2026 WCQ / 2027 ACQ	Tajikistan	1–1	Saudi Arabia	Dushanbe, Tajikistan
20:00 UTC+5	Soirov 80'	Report	Al-Buraikan 46'	Stadium: Pamir Stadium; Attendance: 13,300; Referee: Kim Jong-hyeok (South Korea)

6 June 2026 WCQ / 2027 ACQ	Jordan	3–0	Tajikistan	Amman, Jordan
20:30 UTC+3	Olwan 51'; Al-Naimat 68'; Sadeh 90+4'	Report		Stadium: Amman International Stadium; Attendance: 14,795; Referee: Ahmed Al-Kaf (Oman)

11 June 2026 WCQ / 2027 ACQ	Tajikistan	3–0	Pakistan	Dushanbe, Tajikistan
20:00 UTC+5	Mabatshoev 35'; Safarov 65'; Hanonov 70'	Report		Stadium: Pamir Stadium; Attendance: 7,800; Referee: Mooud Bonyadifard (Iran)

4 September 2024 Merdeka Tournament SF	Lebanon	1–0	Tajikistan	Kuala Lumpur, Malaysia
13:30 UTC+5	Ayoub 13'	Report		Stadium: Bukit Jalil National Stadium; Attendance: 460

8 September 2024 Merdeka Tournament Third place	Tajikistan	0–0 (4–3 p)	Philippines	Kuala Lumpur, Malaysia
16:30 UTC+5				Stadium: Bukit Jalil National Stadium
	Penalties
	Nazarov (penalty scored); Umarbayev (penalty missed); Sharipov (penalty scored); Safarov (penalty scored); Shukurov (penalty scored)		(penalty missed) Tabinas; (penalty missed) Gayoso; (penalty scored) Tabinas; (penalty scored) Monis; (penalty scored) Rontini

11 October 2024 King's Cup SF	Syria	1–0	Tajikistan	Songkhla, Thailand
14:30 UTC+5	Osman 35'	Report		Stadium: Tinsulanon Stadium

14 October 2024 King's Cup Third place	Tajikistan	0–3	Philippines	Songkhla, Thailand
14:30 UTC+5			Holtmann 47'; J. Tabinas 58'; Bailey 62'	Stadium: Tinsulanon Stadium

13 November Friendly	Tajikistan	4–0	Nepal	Dushanbe, Tajikistan
18:00 UTC+5	Mabatshoev 19', 44'; A.Dzhalilov 29', 50'	Report		Stadium: Pamir Stadium

19 November Friendly	Tajikistan	3–1	Afghanistan	Dushanbe, Tajikistan
18:00 UTC+5	Juraboev 11'; Samiev 27'; Yatimov (red card) 39'; Soirov 70'	Report	Asekzai 37'	Stadium: Pamir Stadium

=== 2025 ===
20 March Friendly	Tajikistan	0–5	Belarus	Dushanbe, Tajikistan
16:00 UTC+5		Report	Lisakovich 64'; Melnichenko 73'; Yablonsky 84'; Sedko 87'; Barkouski 90+2'	Stadium: Pamir Stadium; Attendance: 6,300; Referee: Rustam Lutfullin (Uzbekistan)

25 March 2027 AFC Asian Cup qualification	Tajikistan	1–0	Timor-Leste	Dushanbe, Tajikistan
16:00 UTC+5	Hanonov 3'	Report		Stadium: Pamir Stadium; Attendance: 8,520; Referee: Seyedvahid Kazemi (Iran)

5 June Friendly	Cambodia	1–2	Tajikistan	Phnom Penh, Cambodia
17:00 UTC+5	Ratanak 71'	Report	Samiev 51'; Panjshanbe 63'	Stadium: Olympic Stadium; Attendance: 13,780

10 June 2027 AFC Asian Cup qualification	Philippines	2–2	Tajikistan	Capas, Philippines
17:00 UTC+8	Kristensen 28', 79'	Report	Mabatshoyev 30'; Umarbayev 42' (pen.)	Stadium: New Clark City Athletics Stadium; Attendance: 10,854; Referee: Hasan Akrami (Iran)

29 August 2025 CAFA Nations Cup	Tajikistan	1–2	India	Hisor, Tajikistan
20:30 UTC+5	Samiev 23'	Report	Anwar 5'; Jhingan 13'	Stadium: Hisor Central Stadium; Attendance: 17,450; Referee: Firdavs Nosafarov (Uzbekistan)

1 September 2025 CAFA Nations Cup	Tajikistan	2–0	Afghanistan	Hisor, Tajikistan
20:30 UTC+5	Panjshanbe 24' (pen.); Mabatshoyev 90+3'	Report		Stadium: Hisor Central Stadium; Attendance: 15,265; Referee: Zayniddin Alimov (Kyrgyzstan)

4 September 2025 CAFA Nations Cup	Tajikistan	2–2	Iran	Hisor, Tajikistan
20:30 UTC+5	Samiev 58'; Dzhuraboyev 77'	Report	Me.Mohebi 38'; Mo.Mohebi 47'	Stadium: Hisor Central Stadium; Attendance: 18,200; Referee: Axrol Riskullayev (Uzbekistan)

9 October 2027 AFC Asian Cup qualification	Tajikistan	2–0	Maldives	Hisor, Tajikistan
18:00 UTC+5	Samiev 8'; Mabatshoyev 30'	Report		Stadium: Central Stadium; Attendance: 5,250; Referee: Zayniddin Alimov (Kyrgyzstan)

14 October 2027 AFC Asian Cup qualification	Maldives	0–3	Tajikistan	Malé, Maldives
17:00 UTC+5		Report	Safarov 4'; Mabatshoyev 34', 78'	Stadium: National Football Stadium; Attendance: 3,120; Referee: Mohanad Qasim Sarray (Iraq)

18 November 2027 AFC Asian Cup qualification	Timor-Leste	0–5	Tajikistan	Darwin, Australia
11:30 UTC+5		Report	Mabatshoyev 22', 43'; Panjshanbe 25'; Rakhimov 82'; Boboev 86'	Stadium: Territory Rugby League Stadium; Attendance: 538; Referee: Adam Kersey (Australia)

=== 2026 ===
31 March 2027 AFC Asian Cup qualification	Tajikistan	1–1	Philippines	Hisor, Tajikistan
19:00 UTC+5	Boboev 41'	Report	Obermair 19'	Stadium: Central Stadium; Attendance: 15,200; Referee: Hiroki Kasahara (Japan)

5 June Friendly	Tajikistan	3–1	India	Tursunzoda, Tajikistan
	Boboev 9' (pen.); Karimov 62'; Panjshanbe 68'		Choudhary 89'	Stadium: TALCO Arena; Attendance: 10,245; Referee: Asker Nadjafaliev (Uzbekistan)

9 June Friendly	Tajikistan	1–1	India	Tursunzoda, Tajikistan
20:00 UTC+5	Boboev 85' (pen.)	Report	V. P. Singh 25'	Stadium: TALCO Arena; Attendance: 9,370; Referee: Akhrol Riskulloev (Uzbekistan)

== Forthcoming fixtures ==
=== 2027 ===
10 January 2027 Asian Cup GS	Tajikistan	v	Iraq	Riyadh, Saudi Arabia
--:--				Stadium: Al Shabab Stadium

14 January 2027 Asian Cup GS	Singapore	v	Tajikistan	Riyadh, Saudi Arabia
--:--				Stadium: Imam Mohammed Ibn Saud University Stadium

19 January 2027 Asian Cup GS	Australia	v	Tajikistan	Riyadh, Saudi Arabia
--:--				Stadium: Al Shabab Stadium
