= Daler Imomnazarov =

Tajikistani football player (born 1995)

Personal information
- Full name: Daler Imomnazarov
- Date of birth: 31 May 1995 (age 31)
- Place of birth: Tajikistan
- Height: 1.75 m (5 ft 9 in)
- Position: Defender

Team information
- Current team: Regar-TadAZ Tursunzoda
- Number: 27

Senior career*
Years	Team	Apps	(Gls)
2015–2016	Khayr Vahdat		
2017–2021	Dushanbe-83	29	(0)
2021–2023	Istiklol	42	(0)
2023–2025	Eskhata	27	(3)
2025–	Regar-TadAZ	20	(0)

International career^{‡}
2022–	Tajikistan	4	(0)
- * Club domestic league appearances and goals as of 16 March 2026 ‡ National team caps and goals as of 26 September 2022

Daler Imomnazarov (Tajik: Далер Имомназаров, Russian: ‌Далер Имомназаров; born 31 May 1995) is a Tajik professional footballer who plays as a defender for Regar-TadAZ Tursunzoda and the Tajikistan national team.

== Career ==
=== Club ===
On 19 July 2021, Istiklol announced that Imomnazarov had joined the club on trial, signing with the club permanently on 7 August 2021 on a contract until the end of 2023.

On 14 July 2023, Imomnazarov left Istiklol by mutual agreement alongside Siyovush Asrorov and Sayedi Kovussho. On 22 July, Imomnazarov joined Eskhata Khujand.

== Career statistics ==
=== Club ===
As of match played 30 June 2023

Club	Season	League			National Cup		Continental		Other		Total	
Club	Season	Division	Apps	Goals	Apps	Goals	Apps	Goals	Apps	Goals	Apps	Goals
Istiklol	2021	Tajikistan Higher League	14	0	5	0	0 (Note: Appearances in the AFC Champions League)	0	0 (Note: Appearances in the Tajik Supercup)	0	19	0
Istiklol	2022	Tajikistan Higher League	18	0	4	1	4	0	1	0	27	1
Istiklol	2023	Tajikistan Higher League	10	0	0	0	0	0	1	0	11	0
Istiklol	Total		42	0	9	1	4	0	2	0	57	1
Career total			42	0	9	1	4	0	2	0	57	1

=== International ===
Tajikistan national team
Year	Apps	Goals
2022	4	0
Total	4	0

Statistics accurate as of match played 25 September 2022

== Honors ==
=== Club ===
Istiklol

- Tajikistan Higher League: 2022
- Tajikistan Cup: 2022

=== International ===
Tajikistan

- King's Cup: 2022
- Merdeka Tournament: 2023
