= Shahrom Sulaymonov =

Tajikistani footballer

Shakhrom Sulaymonov
Personal information
- Full name: Shakhrom Todzhidinovich Sulaymonov
- Date of birth: 27 June 1997 (age 29)
- Place of birth: Dushanbe, Tajikistan
- Height: 1.75 m (5 ft 9 in)
- Position: Midfielder

Team information
- Current team: Istiklol
- Number: 70

Youth career
- 2009-2015: Rubin Kazan
- 2016: HJK

Senior career*
Years	Team	Apps	(Gls)
2017	Utenis Utena	10	(1)
2017	→ Istiklol (loan)	0	(0)
2018–2024	Istiklol	79	(1)
2020	→ Lokomotiv Pamir (loan)	18	(3)
2024	Khosilot Farkhor	20	(1)
2025–	Istiklol	7	(1)

International career^{‡}
2018–	Tajikistan	2	(0)
- * Club domestic league appearances and goals as of 12:23, 11 December 2025 (UTC) ‡ National team caps and goals as of 10:59, 2 June 2022 (UTC)

Shakhrom Todzhidinovich Sulaymonov (Tajik: Шаҳром Тоҷидинович Сулаймонов; Russian: ‌Шахром Тоджидинович Сулаймонов), born 27 June 1997) is a Tajik professional footballer who plays as a midfielder for Istiklol.

== Career ==
=== Club ===
On 6 August 2017, Sulaymonov was introduced as a new signing for FC Istiklol, signing on loan from Utenis Utena until the end of the 2017 season.

On 6 March 2020, Sulaymonov joined Lokomotiv Pamir on loan for the season.

On 26 February 2024, Istiklol confirmed the departure of Sulaymonov at the end of his contract, alongside Romish Jalilov, and that he had signed for Khosilot Farkhor.

On 19 February 2025, Istiklol announced the return of Sulaymonov and Romish Jalilov from Khosilot Farkhor.

=== International ===
Sulaymonov made his senior international debut on 12 October 2018, in a 0–0 draw against Palestine.

== Career statistics ==
=== Club ===
As of match played 30 November 2025

Club	Season	League			National Cup		Continental		Other		Total	
Club	Season	Division	Apps	Goals	Apps	Goals	Apps	Goals	Apps	Goals	Apps	Goals
Utenis Utena	2017	A Lyga	10	1	0	0	–		–		10	1
Istiklol (loan)	2017	Tajikistan Higher League	0	0	0	0	0	0	0	0	0	0
Istiklol	2018	Tajikistan Higher League	10	0	7	0	0	0	0	0	17	0
Istiklol	2019	Tajikistan Higher League	16	0	5	2	1	0	0	0	22	2
Istiklol	2020	Tajikistan Higher League	0	0	0	0	0	0	0	0	0	0
Istiklol	2021	Tajikistan Higher League	12	0	3	0	6	0	1	0	22	0
Istiklol	2022	Tajikistan Higher League	22	0	4	1	6	1	1	0	33	2
Istiklol	2023	Tajikistan Higher League	19	1	5	1	3	0	0	0	27	2
Istiklol	Total		79	1	24	4	16	1	2	0	121	6
Lokomotiv-Pamir (loan)	2020	Tajikistan Higher League	19	3	2	0	–		–		21	3
Khosilot Farkhor	2024	Tajikistan Higher League	20	1			–		–		20	1
Istiklol	2025	Tajikistan Higher League	7	1	2	0	0 (Note: Appearances in the AFC Champions League Two)	0	0 (Note: Appearances in the Tajik Supercup)	0	10	1
Career total			135	7	28	4	16	1	3	0	182	12

=== International ===
Tajikistan national team
Year	Apps	Goals
2018	1	0
2019	0	0
2020	0	0
2021	0	0
2022	1	0
Total	2	0

Statistics accurate as of match played 1 June 2022

== Honors ==
Istiklol

- Tajikistan Higher League (5): 2017, 2018 2019, 2021, 2022, 2023
- Tajikistan Cup (4): 2018, 2019, 2022, 2023
- Tajik Supercup (4): 2018, 2019, 2021, 2022
