= Rustam Yatimov =

Tajik-Russian footballer

Personal information
- Full name: Rustam Boborakhimovich Yatimov
- Date of birth: 13 July 1998 (age 28)
- Place of birth: Nizhny Novgorod, Russia
- Height: 1.94 m (6 ft 4 in)
- Position: Goalkeeper

Team information
- Current team: Rostov
- Number: 1

Youth career
- Nizhny Novgorod

Senior career*
Years	Team	Apps	(Gls)
2016	Nizhny Novgorod	0	(0)
2017	Istiklol	0	(0)
2017	Nizhny Novgorod	0	(0)
2018–2024	Istiklol	83	(0)
2024–	Rostov	53	(0)

International career^{‡}
2019–2020	Tajikistan U23		
2019–	Tajikistan	55	(0)
- * Club domestic league appearances and goals as of 22 August 2026 ‡ National team caps and goals as of 6 October 2026

Rustam Boborakhimovich Yatimov (Tajik: ‌Рустам Боборахимович Ятимов, Russian: Рустам Боборахимович Ятимов; born 13 July 1998) is a professional football player who plays for Russian club Rostov. Born in Russia, he plays for the Tajikistan national team.

== Early life ==
Yatimov was born in Nizhny Novgorod, Russia to a Tajik father and a Russian mother.

== Career ==
=== Club ===
On 26 February 2016, Nizhny Novgorod registered Yatimov to senior squad for the remainder of the 2015–16 season.

On 24 February 2017, FC Istiklol announced the signing of Yatimov on a five-year contract. On 5 July 2017, Yatimov was released by Istiklol by mutual consent citing his desire to return to a team in Russia. On 23 July 2018, Yatimov returned to Istiklol, signing a contract until the end of 2020. In FC Istiklol, Rustam Yatimov played 92 official matches, of which 39 were clean sheets. He is a six-time champion of Tajikistan, as well as a four-time winner of the Tajikistan Cup and Tajikistan Super Cup.

On 16 June 2024, Russian Premier League club Rostov announce the singing of Yatimov from Istiklol for a fee in excess of $250,000.

=== International ===
Yatimov made his international debut for Tajikistan on 7 June 2019, in a 1–1 draw against Afghanistan.

== Career statistics ==
=== Club ===
As of match played 28 October 2026

Appearances and goals by club, season and competition
Club	Season	League			National Cup		Continental		Other		Total	
Club	Season	Division	Apps	Goals	Apps	Goals	Apps	Goals	Apps	Goals	Apps	Goals
Istiklol	2017	Tajikistan Higher League	0	0	0	0	0 (Note: Appearances in the AFC Cup)	0	0 (Note: Appearances in the Tajik Supercup)	0	0	0
Nizhny Novgorod	2017–18	Russian National League	0	0	0	0	—		—		0	0
Istiklol	2018	Tajikistan Higher League	1	0	2	0	0	0	0	0	3	0
Istiklol	2019	Tajikistan Higher League	15	0	6	0	0 (Note: Zero appearances in the AFC Champions League, zero appearance in the AFC Cup)	0	0	0	21	0
Istiklol	2020	Tajikistan Higher League	17	0	1	0	3 (Note: Two appearances in the AFC Champions League, one appearance in the AFC Cup)	0	1	0	22	0
Istiklol	2021	Tajikistan Higher League	7	0	0	0	6 (Note: Appearances in the AFC Champions League)	0	1	0	14	0
Istiklol	2022	Tajikistan Higher League	18	0	5	0	5	0	1	0	29	0
Istiklol	2023	Tajikistan Higher League	18	0	5	0	6	0	1	0	30	0
Istiklol	2024	Tajikistan Higher League	7	0	0	0	0 (Note: Appearances in the AFC Champions League Two)	0	1	0	8	0
Istiklol	Total		83	0	19	0	20	0	5	0	127	0
Rostov	2024–25	Russian Premier League	20	0	8	0	—		—		28	0
Rostov	2025–26	Russian Premier League	28	0	2	0	—		—		30	0
Rostov	2026–27	Russian Premier League	5	0	1	0	—		—		6	0
Rostov	Total		53	0	11	0	0	0	0	0	64	0
Career total			136	0	30	0	20	0	5	0	191	0

=== International ===
Tajikistan national team
Year	Apps	Goals
2019	12	0
2020	1	0
2021	7	0
2022	9	0
2023	7	0
2024	11	0
2025	3	0
2026	5	0
Total	55	0

Statistics accurate as of match played 6 October 2026

== Honors ==
Istiklol

- Tajikistan Higher League: 2018, 2019, 2020, 2021, 2022, 2023
- Tajikistan Cup: 2018, 2019, 2022, 2023
- Tajik Supercup: 2019, 2020, 2021, 2022, 2024

Tajikistan

- King's Cup: 2022

Individual

- Tajikistan Higher League Best Goalkeeper: 2023

== Links ==
- Rustam Yatimov at FC Rostov
- Rustam Yatimov at Global Sports Archive
