= Ravshan Zafarobod =

- Full name: Ravshan Zafarobod
- Founded: 2016; 10 years ago
- Ground: Zafarobod, Tajikistan
- Manager: Rahmatullo Fuzailov
- League: Tajikistan First League
- 2022: Ligai Olii Tojikiston 10th of 10 (Relegated)

Ravshan Zafarobod (Tajik: Равшан Зафаробод), is a football club based in Zafarobod, Tajikistan who currently play in the Tajikistan Higher League.

== History ==
=== Domestic history ===
Season	League									Tajik Cup	Top goalscorer		Manager
Season	Div.	Pos.	Pl.	W	D	L	GS	GA	P	Tajik Cup	Name	League	Manager
2020	2nd	4th	22	11	6	5	47	28	39	Last 16			
2021	2nd	2nd	22	16	3	3	60	18	51	Preliminary round			
2022	1st	10th	22	4	8	10	21	46	20	?	(Tajikistan) Bakhtiyor Zaripov	6	(Tajikistan) Rakhmatullo Fuzaylov

== Current squad ==
As of 7 August 2022

Note: Flags indicate national team as defined under FIFA eligibility rules; some limited exceptions apply. Players may hold more than one non-FIFA nationality.

No.	Pos.	Nation	Player
5	MF	TJK	Shokhrukh Kobilbekov
7	DF	TJK	Azimjon Mavlonov
8	MF	TJK	Khursandmurod Dzhumaev
9	MF	TJK	Jamoliddin Zardiev
10	MF	TJK	Parvizjon Dekhkonov
11	FW	TJK	Bakhtiyor Zaripov
16	GK	TJK	Murodullo Saidov
17	DF	TJK	Mavlonjon Ismoilov
18	MF	TJK	Jahongir Aliev
21	DF	TJK	Umed Odinaev
24	DF	UZB	Javokhir Gaibullaev
27	MF	UZB	Behruz Dustmurodov

No.	Pos.	Nation	Player
31	FW	TJK	Shomakhmad Okhunov
35	GK	UZB	Muchriddin Akhmedov
77	FW	TJK	Bakhtovar Zokirov
—	DF	UZB	Shakhzod Abdurakhimov
—	DF	UZB	Mirzhalol Kurbonov
—	MF	TJK	Diyor Maraufov
—	MF	TJK	Umid Mirsadiev
—	MF	TJK	Akhmadzhon Tuychiev
—	FW	TJK	Daler Makhatov
—	FW	UZB	Jakhongir Kurbonboev
—	FW	UZB	Sardor Matmurodov
