= 2022 Tajik Super Cup =

- Event: Tajik Supercup
Istiklol	Khujand
1	0
- Date: 8 May 2022
- Venue: TALCO Arena, Tursunzoda
- Man of the Match: Rustam Soirov
- Referee: Nasim Khamidov
- Attendance: 5,600

The 2022 Tajik Supercup was the 13th Tajik Supercup, an annual Tajik football match played between the winners of the previous season's Tajikistan Higher League and Tajikistan Cup. The match was contested by 2021 League champions Istiklol, and the 2021 Cup champions Khujand.

== Background ==
On 4 May, it was confirmed that the Tajik Supercup would be held at the TALCO Arena in Tursunzoda on 8 May 2022. On 5 May, Nasim Khamidov was confirmed as the match referee.

== Match ==
=== Summary ===
A solitary second half goal from substitute Rustam Soirov in the 84th minute, sealed Istiklol's 11th Tajik Supercup title.

=== Details ===
8 May 2022
16:30 (UTC+5)

Istiklol	1–0	Khujand
Soirov 84'	Report

TALCO Arena, Tursunzoda
Attendance: 5,600
Referee: Nasim Khamidov

Istiklol	Khujand

GK	1	(Tajikistan)	Rustam Yatimov	Booked
DF	44	(Russia)	Nikita Chicherin
DF	17	(Belarus)	Uladzislaw Kasmynin
DF	5	(Tajikistan)	Iskandar Dzhalilov
DF	27	(Tajikistan)	Daler Imomnazarov		(substituted off) 90+1'
MF	7	(Tajikistan)	Mukhammadzhon Rakhimov		(substituted off) 46'
MF	8	(Tajikistan)	Nuriddin Davronov	Booked
MF	70	(Tajikistan)	Shakhrom Sulaimonov		(substituted off) 90+1'
FW	11	(Tajikistan)	Shervoni Mabatshoev		(substituted off) 77'
FW	63	(Tajikistan)	Manuchekhr Dzhalilov
FW	90	(Gabon)	Eric Bocoum		(substituted off) 64'
Substitutes:
GK	50	(Tajikistan)	Mukhriddin Khasanov
DF	4	(Ukraine)	Temur Partsvania
FW	9	(Tajikistan)	Rustam Soirov		(substituted in) 64'
DF	14	(Tajikistan)	Sayedi Kovussho		(substituted in) 90+1'
DF	19	(Tajikistan)	Akhtam Nazarov		(substituted in) 90+1'
DF	23	(Tajikistan)	Alidzhon Karomatullozoda		(substituted in) 77'
MF	84	(Tajikistan)	Islom Zoirov	Booked	(substituted in) 46'
Manager:
(Tajikistan) Vitaliy Levchenko

GK	1	(Tajikistan)	Daler Barotov
DF	5	(Uzbekistan)	Firdavs Abdusalimov	Booked
DF	21	(Tajikistan)	Firdavs Chakalov
DF	66	(Tajikistan)	Naimjon Ibrohimzoda		(substituted off) 90+2'
DF	73	(Tajikistan)	Alisher Barotov
MF	8	(Tajikistan)	Ekhson Boboev
MF	22	(Tajikistan)	Sorbon Avgonov		(substituted off) 79'
MF	77	(Tajikistan)	Karomatullo Saidov		(substituted off) 66'
FW	62	(Tajikistan)	Jahongir Ergashev
FW	63	(Tajikistan)	Mukhammadali Azizboev		(substituted off) 66'
FW	97	(Russia)	Sergei Tskanyan
Substitutes:
GK	50	(Tajikistan)	Shokhrukh Kirgizboev
DF	4	(Tajikistan)	Parviz Bokiev
MF	6	(Tajikistan)	Khodzhiboy Ziyoev
MF	7	(Belarus)	Andrey Levkovets		(substituted in) 66'
FW	10	(Uzbekistan)	Shokhrukh Makhmudkhozhiev		(substituted in) 66'
MF	18	(Tajikistan)	Daler Edgorov		(substituted in) 79'
DF	98	(Belarus)	Ignatiy Sidor		(substituted in) 90+2'
Manager:
(Tajikistan) Rustam Khojayev

Man of the Match:Rustam Soirov
Assistant referees:
Kholmurod Abdusalomov (Shahrinav)
Gairat Ruziboev (Shahrinav)
Fourth official:
Akmal Buriev (Tursunzade)

Match rules

- 90 minutes
- Penalty shoot-out if scores level
- Seven named substitutes
- Maximum of six substitutions

== See also ==
- 2021 Tajikistan Higher League
- 2021 Tajikistan Cup
