= Hlib Hrachov =

Ukrainian footballer

Personal information
- Full name: Hlib Pavlovych Hrachov
- Date of birth: 15 May 1997 (age 29)
- Place of birth: Popasna, Ukraine
- Height: 1.80 m (5 ft 11 in)
- Position: Defender

Team information
- Current team: Muras United

Youth career
- 2011–2012: LVUFK Luhansk
- 2012–2014: Metalurh Donetsk

Senior career*
Years	Team	Apps	(Gls)
2014–2015	Metalurh Donetsk	0	(0)
2015–2018	Stal Kamianske	25	(0)
2018–2019	Chornomorets Odesa	33	(2)
2020–2022	SKA-Khabarovsk	42	(1)
2022	Asteras Vlachioti	7	(1)
2022	Istiklol	12	(0)
2023	Liepāja	11	(0)
2023	Saburtalo Tbilisi	5	(0)
2024	Dainava	18	(0)
2025–	Muras United	32	(4)
- * Club domestic league appearances and goals

Hlib Pavlovych Hrachov (Ukrainian: Гліб Павлович Грачов; born 15 May 1997) is a Ukrainian professional football defender.

== Career ==
Hrachov is a product of the LVUFK Luhansk and Metalurh Donetsk youth sportive team systems.

After dissolution of Metalurh Donetsk in 2015, he was signed by Stal Dniprodzerzhynsk and made his debut in the winning match against Zorya Luhansk on 16 July 2017 in the Ukrainian Premier League.

On 27 July 2020, he signed a 1-year contract with Russian club SKA-Khabarovsk.

In July 2022, Hrachov featured for Istiklol during their friendly match against Navbahor Namangan, and was announced as a new signing for the Tajikistan Higher League club 3 August 2022.

== Career statistics ==
=== Club ===
As of match played 4 November 2022

Club	Season	League			National Cup		Continental		Other		Total	
Club	Season	Division	Apps	Goals	Apps	Goals	Apps	Goals	Apps	Goals	Apps	Goals
Chornomorets Odesa	2018–19	Ukrainian Premier League	28	2	2	1	-		1	0	31	3
Chornomorets Odesa	2019–20	Ukrainian First League	5	0	0	0	-		-		5	0
Chornomorets Odesa	Total		33	2	2	1	-	-	1	0	36	3
SKA-Khabarovsk	2020–21	Russian First League	27	0	3	0	-		-		30	0
SKA-Khabarovsk	2021–22	Russian First League	15	1	1	0	-		-		16	1
SKA-Khabarovsk	Total		42	1	4	0	-	-	-	-	46	1
Asteras Vlachioti	2021–22	Super League Greece 2	7	1	0	0	-		-		7	1
Istiklol	2022	Tajikistan Higher League	12	0	5	0	0	0	0	0	17	0
Liepāja	2023	Latvian Higher League	0	0	0	0	-		-		0	0
Career total			94	4	11	1	-	-	1	0	106	5

== Honors ==
Istiklol

- Tajikistan Higher League (1):2022
- Tajikistan Cup (1): 2022
