= Uladzislaw Kasmynin =

Belarusian footballer

Personal information
- Date of birth: 17 January 1990 (age 36)
- Place of birth: Novopolotsk, Vitebsk Oblast, Belarusian SSR, Soviet Union
- Height: 1.80 m (5 ft 11 in)
- Position: Centre back

Youth career
- 2005–2009: Naftan Novopolotsk

Senior career*
Years	Team	Apps	(Gls)
2008–2015	Naftan Novopolotsk	29	(0)
2010	→ Polotsk (loan)	26	(4)
2011–2012	→ Volna Pinsk (loan)	44	(1)
2013	→ Granit Mikashevichi (loan)	23	(5)
2014	→ Vitebsk (loan)	13	(2)
2016	Granit Mikashevichi	14	(1)
2016	Neman Grodno	11	(1)
2017–2018	AGMK	53	(8)
2019	Okzhetpes	12	(1)
2019	AGMK	7	(0)
2020	Qizilqum Zarafshon	11	(1)
2021	Turon Yaypan	20	(2)
2022	Istiklol	16	(1)
2023	Metallurg Bekabad	11	(0)
2023	Maktaaral	0	(0)
2024	Neman Grodno	9	(0)
- * Club domestic league appearances and goals as of 6 April 2026

Uladzislaw Kasmynin (Belarusian: Уладзіслаў Касмынін; Russian: Владислав Космынин; born 17 January 1990) is a Belarusian former professional footballer who last played for Neman Grodno.

== Career ==
=== Club ===
On 31 March 2022, Istiklol confirmed the signing of Kasmynin.

== Career statistics ==
=== Club ===
As of match played 31 August 2024

Club	Season	League			National Cup		League Cup		Continental		Other		Total	
Club	Season	Division	Apps	Goals	Apps	Goals	Apps	Goals	Apps	Goals	Apps	Goals	Apps	Goals
Granit Mikashevichi	2016	Belarusian Premier League	14	1	0	0	-		-		-		14	1
Neman Grodno	2016	Belarusian Premier League	11	1	1	0	-		-		-		12	1
AGMK	2017	Uzbekistan Super League	27	6	2	0	-		-		2	1	31	7
AGMK	2018	Uzbekistan Super League	26	2	4	0	-		-		-		30	2
AGMK	Total		53	8	6	0	-	-	-	-	2	1	61	9
Okzhetpes	2019	Kazakhstan Premier League	12	1	1	0	-		-		-		13	1
AGMK	2019	Uzbekistan Super League	7	0	2	0	1	0	-		-		10	0
Qizilqum Zarafshon	2020	Uzbekistan Super League	11	1	0	0	-		-		-		11	1
Turon Yaypan	2021	Uzbekistan Super League	20	2	3	0	-		-		-		23	2
Istiklol	2022	Tajikistan Higher League	16	1	5	0	-		5 (Note: Appearances in the AFC Champions League)	1	1 (Note: Appearances in the Tajik Supercup)	0	27	2
Metallurg Bekabad	2023	Uzbekistan Super League	11	0	2	0	-		-		-		13	0
Maktaaral	2023	Kazakhstan Premier League	0	0	0	0	-		-		-		0	0
Neman Grodno	2024	Belarusian Premier League	9	0	3	0	-		-		-		12	0
Career total			164	15	23	0	1	0	5	1	3	1	196	17

== Honours ==
Naftan Novopolotsk

- Belarusian Cup (1): 2008–09

AGMK

- Uzbekistan Cup (1): 2018

Istiklol

- Tajikistan Higher League (1):2022
- Tajikistan Cup (1): 2022
- Tajik Supercup (1): 2022

Neman Grodno

- Belarusian Cup (1): 2023–24
