= Manuchekhr Dzhalilov =

Tajik footballer (born 1990)

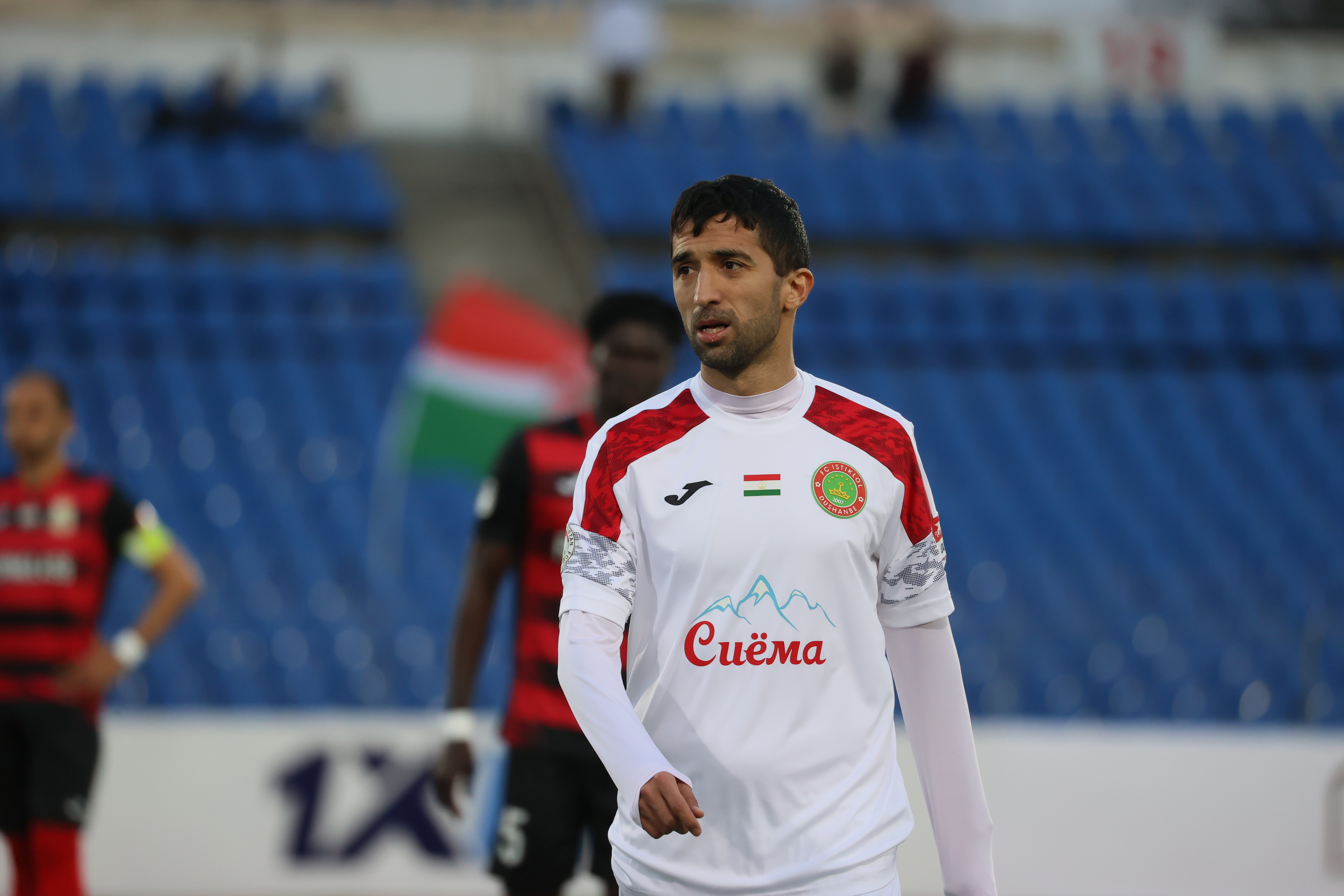

Personal information
- Full name: Manuchekhr Nasrulloyevich Dzhalilov
- Date of birth: 27 September 1990 (age 36)
- Place of birth: Hisor, Tajik SSR, Soviet Union
- Height: 1.77 m (5 ft 10 in)
- Position: Forward

Youth career
- –2008: Lokomotiv Moscow

Senior career*
Years	Team	Apps	(Gls)
2009–2010	Lokomotiv-2 Moscow	44	(8)
2011–2014	Neftekhimik Nizhnekamsk	86	(10)
2015–2017	Istiklol	47	(59)
2018	Sriwijaya	30	(7)
2019	Persebaya Surabaya	14	(1)
2020–2026	Istiklol	101	(82)

International career
2007	Tajikistan U17	4	(0)
2011–2025	Tajikistan	54	(20)
- * Club domestic league appearances and goals

Manuchekhr Nasrulloyevich Dzhalilov (Tajik: Манучеҳр Ҷалилов, Russian: Манучехр Насруллоевич Джалилов; born 27 September 1990) is a Tajik former professional footballer who played as a forward.

== Club career ==
Prior to the start of the 2015 season, Dzhalilov joined reigning Tajik League champions FC Istiklol. At the end of Dzhalilov's first season with FC Istiklol he won the league, earning the League's Top Goalscorer and Player of the Year in the process.

In December 2017, it was rumored Dzhalilov had agreed a one-year contract with Indonesian Liga 1 side Sriwijaya, with Sriwijaya confirming his arrival on 17 December 2017, and Istiklol his departure on 4 January 2018.

Following his release from Persebaya Surabaya at the end of the 2019 season, Dzhalilov featured for Istiklol in their first friendly of 2020, a 2–1 defeat to Kokand 1912 on 9 January 2020.

Dzhalilov returned to football following his illness in March 2024, featuring in Istiklol's 1-1 draw with Spartak-2 Moscow during their training camp in Turkey.

On 20 February 2025, Dzhalilov extended his contract with Istiklol for the 2025 season. On 2 March 2026, Dzhalilov announced his retirement.

== International career ==
Dzhalilov was a member of Tajikistan U17 football team at the 2007 FIFA U-17 World Cup, making his senior team debut on 2 September 2011 against Uzbekistan.

== Personal life ==
In September 2023, it was reported that Dzhalilov had been hospitalised in Moscow with a serious illness.

== Career statistics ==
=== Club ===
As of match played 4 December 2025

Appearances and goals by club, season and competition
Club	Season	League			National cup		Continental		Other		Total	
Club	Season	Division	Apps	Goals	Apps	Goals	Apps	Goals	Apps	Goals	Apps	Goals
Lokomotiv-2 Moscow	2009	Russian Second Division	21	4	0	0	–		–		21	4
Lokomotiv-2 Moscow	2010	Russian Second Division	23	4	1	0	–		–		24	4
Lokomotiv-2 Moscow	Total		44	8	1	0	0	0	0	0	45	8
Neftekhimik Nizhnekamsk	2011–12	Russian Second Division	14	4	0	0	–		–		14	4
Neftekhimik Nizhnekamsk	2012–13	Russian Football League	25	2	1	0	–		–		26	2
Neftekhimik Nizhnekamsk	2013–14	Russian Football League	34	3	1	0	–		–		34	3
Neftekhimik Nizhnekamsk	2014–15	Russian Second Division	13	1	2	1	–		–		15	2
Neftekhimik Nizhnekamsk	Total		86	10	4	1	0	0	0	0	90	11
Istiklol	2015	Tajik League	13	22	6	4	11 (Note: Appearances and goals in the AFC Cup)	4	–		30	30
Istiklol	2016	Tajik League	17	22	6	9	6	0	1 (Note: Appearances and goals in the Tajik Supercup)	0	30	31
Istiklol	2017	Tajik League	17	15	2	3	11	7	1	0	31	25
Istiklol	Total		47	59	14	16	28	11	2	0	91	86
Sriwijaya	2018	Liga 1 (Indonesia)	30	7	3	2	–		–		33	9
Persebaya Surabaya	2019	Liga 1 (Indonesia)	14	1	0	0	–		–		14	1
Istiklol	2020	Tajikistan Higher League	17	16	1	4	3 (Note: Two appearances in the AFC Champions League, one appearance and two goals in the AFC Cup)	2	1	1	22	23
Istiklol	2021	Tajikistan Higher League	20	18	4	2	7 (Note: Appearances and goals in the AFC Champions League)	3	1	0	32	23
Istiklol	2022	Tajikistan Higher League	19	16	4	5	6	1	1	0	30	22
Istiklol	2023	Tajikistan Higher League	11	9	0	0	0	0	1	0	12	9
Istiklol	2024	Tajikistan Higher League	21	17	4	2	5 (Note: Appearances in the AFC Champions League Two)	0	1	0	31	19
Istiklol	2025	Tajikistan Higher League	13	6	0	0	1	0	0	0	14	6
Istiklol	Total		101	82	13	13	22	6	5	1	141	102
Career total			322	167	35	32	50	17	7	1	414	217

=== International ===
Appearances and goals by national team and year
National team	Year	Apps	Goals
Tajikistan	2011	1	0
Tajikistan	2012	0	0
Tajikistan	2013	0	0
Tajikistan	2014	0	0
Tajikistan	2015	7	7
Tajikistan	2016	9	4
Tajikistan	2017	6	4
Tajikistan	2018	1	0
Tajikistan	2019	6	2
Tajikistan	2020	3	0
Tajikistan	2021	6	2
Tajikistan	2022	7	1
Tajikistan	2023	5	0
Tajikistan	2024	1	0
Tajikistan	2025	2	0
Total		54	20

Scores and results list Tajikistan's goal tally first, score column indicates score after each Dzhalilov goal.

List of international goals scored by Manuchekhr Dzhalilov
No.	Date	Venue	Opponent	Score	Result	Competition
1	26 March 2015	Male' Sports Complex, Malé, Maldives	Maldives	2–0	2–0	Friendly
2	11 June 2015	Pamir Stadium, Dushanbe, Tajikistan	Jordan	1–2	1–3	2018 FIFA World Cup qualification
3	8 October 2015	Spartak Stadium, Bishkek, Kyrgyzstan	Kyrgyzstan	1–1	2–2	2018 FIFA World Cup qualification
4	12 November 2015	Pamir Stadium, Dushanbe, Tajikistan	Bangladesh	1–0	5–0	2018 FIFA World Cup qualification
5	12 November 2015	Pamir Stadium, Dushanbe, Tajikistan	Bangladesh	2–0	5–0	2018 FIFA World Cup qualification
6	12 November 2015	Pamir Stadium, Dushanbe, Tajikistan	Bangladesh	4–0	5–0	2018 FIFA World Cup qualification
7	12 November 2015	Pamir Stadium, Dushanbe, Tajikistan	Bangladesh	5–0	5–0	2018 FIFA World Cup qualification
8	9 November 2016	Pamir Stadium, Dushanbe, Tajikistan	Turkmenistan	1–0	3–0	Friendly
9	9 November 2016	Pamir Stadium, Dushanbe, Tajikistan	Turkmenistan	2–0	3–0	Friendly
10	9 November 2016	Pamir Stadium, Dushanbe, Tajikistan	Turkmenistan	3–0	3–0	Friendly
11	13 November 2016	Pamir Stadium, Dushanbe, Tajikistan	Afghanistan	1–0	1–0	Friendly
12	23 March 2017	Bahrain National Stadium, Riffa, Bahrain	Bahrain	1–0	1–0	Friendly
13	13 June 2017	Pamir Stadium, Dushanbe, Tajikistan	Philippines	3–4	3–4	2019 AFC Asian Cup qualification
14	5 September 2017	Dasarath Rangasala Stadium, Kathmandu, Nepal	Nepal	1–0	2–1	2019 AFC Asian Cup qualification
15	10 October 2017	Central Stadium, Hisor, Tajikistan	Nepal	3–0	3–0	2019 AFC Asian Cup qualification
16	14 November 2019	Thuwunna Stadium, Yangon, Myanmar	Myanmar	1–1	3–4	2022 FIFA World Cup qualification
17	14 November 2019	Thuwunna Stadium, Yangon, Myanmar	Myanmar	3–4	3–4	2022 FIFA World Cup qualification
18	25 March 2021	Pamir Stadium, Dushanbe, Tajikistan	Mongolia	3–0	3–0	2022 FIFA World Cup qualification
19	15 June 2021	Yanmar Stadium, Osaka, Japan	Myanmar	2–0	4–0	2022 FIFA World Cup qualification
20	8 June 2022	Dolen Omurzakov Stadium, Bishkek, Kyrgyzstan	Myanmar	2–0	4–0	2023 AFC Asian Cup qualification

== Honours ==
Istiklol

- Tajik League: 2015, 2016, 2017, 2020, 2021, 2022, 2023
- Tajikistan Cup: 2016, 2022, 2023
- Tajik Supercup: 2015, 2016, 2020, 2021, 2022, 2024

Sriwijaya

- East Kalimantan Governor Cup: 2018
- Indonesia President's Cup third place: 2018

Persebaya Surabaya

- Indonesia President's Cup runner-up: 2019

Individual

- Tajik Top Scorer: 2015, 2016, 2021, 2022
- Tajik Player of the year: 2015, 2016
- AFC Cup Most Valuable Player: 2017
- Indonesia President's Cup Top Goalscorer: 2019 (shared)
