= Eric Bocoum =

Gabonese footballer

Personal information
- Full name: Eric Baboué Bagnama Bocoum
- Date of birth: 16 March 1999 (age 27)
- Place of birth: Libreville, Gabon
- Height: 1.95 m (6 ft 5 in)
- Position: Attacking midfielder

Team information
- Current team: Sanat Naft Abadan
- Number: 13

Youth career
- 2016–2019: CF Mounana

Senior career*
Years	Team	Apps	(Gls)
2016–2021	CF Mounana		
2021–2026	Gol Gohar	84	(3)
2022	→ Istiklol (loan)	1	(0)
2026–	Sanat Naft	5	(1)

International career^{‡}
2024–	Gabon	9	(0)
- * Club domestic league appearances and goals as of 21:18, 15 December 2025 (UTC) ‡ National team caps and goals as of 24 December 2025

Eric Baboué Bagnama Bocoum (born 16 March 1999) is a Gabonese professional footballer who plays as a Attacking Midfielder for Persian Gulf Pro League club Sanat Naft Abadan.

== Career ==
On 31 March 2022, Bocoum was announced as a new signing by Istiklol, with the club confirming his departure at the end of his loan spell on 4 July 2022.

== Career statistics ==
=== Club ===
As of match played 15 December 2025

Club	Season	League			National Cup		Continental		Other		Total	
Club	Season	Division	Apps	Goals	Apps	Goals	Apps	Goals	Apps	Goals	Apps	Goals
Gol Gohar	2021–22	Persian Gulf Pro League	3	0	0	0	–		–		3	0
Gol Gohar	2022–23	Persian Gulf Pro League	20	2	0	0	–		–		20	2
Gol Gohar	2023–24	Persian Gulf Pro League	24	1	4	0	–		–		28	1
Gol Gohar	2024–25	Persian Gulf Pro League	22	0	3	0	–		–		25	0
Gol Gohar	2025–26	Persian Gulf Pro League	13	0	1	0	–		–		14	0
Gol Gohar	Total		82	3	8	0	0	0	0	0	90	3
Istiklol (loan)	2022	Tajikistan Higher League	1	0	0	0	6 (Note: Appearances and goal in the AFC Champions League)	1	1 (Note: Appearances in the Tajik Supercup)	0	8	1
Career total			83	4	8	0	6	1	1	0	98	4

=== International ===
As of match played 24 December 2025

Appearances and goals by national team and year
National team	Year	Apps	Goals
Gabon	2024	7	0
Gabon	2025	2	0
Total		9	0

== Honors ==
Istiklol

- Tajik Supercup: 2022
