= 2022 Tajikistan Higher League =

Tajikistan Higher League
- Season: 2022
- Champions: Istiklol
- Relegated: Istaravshan; Ravshan Zafarobod
- AFC Champions League: Istiklol
- AFC Cup: Ravshan Kulob; Khujand
- Matches: 104
- Goals: 255 (2.45 per match)
- Top goalscorer: Manuchekhr Dzhalilov (16 goals)
- Biggest home win: Istiklol 7–0 Ravshan Zafarobod
- Biggest away win: Fayzkand 0–5 Istaravshan
- Highest scoring: Istiklol 7–0 Ravshan Zafarobod
- Longest winning run: Istiklol (5)
- Longest unbeaten run: Istiklol (11)
- Longest winless run: Ravshan Zafarobod (7)
- Longest losing run: Istaravshan (5); Ravshan Zafarobod (5)
- All statistics correct as of 27 November 2022.

The 2022 Ligai Olii Tojikiston (Tajik: 2022 Лигаи Олии Тоҷикистон, Russian: 2022 Высшая Лига Таджикистана), or 2022 Tajikistan Higher League was the 31st season of the Tajikistan Higher League, Tajikistan's top division of association football.

== Season events ==
On 28 January 2022, the Tajikistan Football Federation announced that for the upcoming season each club would be able to register 7 foreign players, with five being able to be on the pitch at the same time.

On 2 March 2022, the Tajikistan Football Federation announced that for the upcoming season will be a format change of the tournament, on the first stage the 10 teams will play each other twice (18 games per team). On the final stage there will be two groups, the Championship round will be played by the teams on position one to five of the first stage and the Relegation round will be played by the teams on position six to ten, both groups will play each other once (four games per team).

== Teams ==
On 28 February, the Tajikistan Football Federation confirmed that 10 teams would take part in the 2022 season.

Locations of teams in the 2021 Tajikistan Higher League

Team	Location	Venue	Capacity
CSKA Pamir	Dushanbe	CSKA Stadium	7,000
Eskhata	Khujand	Bistsolagii Istiqloliyati Stadium	20,000
Fayzkand	Hulbuk	Central Stadium	
Istaravshan	Istaravshan	Central Stadium	20,000
Istiklol	Dushanbe	Central Republican Stadium	24,000
Khatlon	Bokhtar	Tsentralnyi Stadium	10,000
Khujand	Khujand	Bistsolagii Istiqloliyati Stadium	20,000
Ravshan Kulob	Kulob	Central Stadium	
Ravshan Zafarobod	Zafarobod	Spartak Stadium	
Regar-TadAZ	Tursunzoda	TALCO Arena	10,000

=== Personnel and sponsoring ===
Team	Manager	Captain	Kit manufacturer	Sponsor
CSKA Pamir	(Iran) Amin Subhoni		Joma	1xBet
Eskhata	(Tajikistan) Khamid Karimov		Joma	
Fayzkand	(Iran) Masoud Nazarzadeh		Joma	-
Istaravshan	(Uzbekistan) Numon Khasanov		Joma	Parimatch
Istiklol	(Tajikistan) Alisher Tukhtaev (Interim)		Joma	Siyoma
Khatlon	(Tajikistan) Asliddin Khabibullaev		Joma	Parimatch
Khujand	(Tajikistan) Rustam Khojayev		Joma	Formula 55
Ravshan Kulob	(Tajikistan) Boir Gamberdiev		Joma	Hoji Mustafo
Ravshan Zafarobod	(Tajikistan) Rahmatullo Fuzailov		Joma	Hoji Mustafo
Regar-TadAZ	(Tajikistan) Hikmat Fuzailov		Joma	TALCO

=== Foreign players ===
Tajikistan Higher League clubs are allowed to register seven foreign players, with five being able to be on the pitch at the same time.

Club	Player 1	Player 2	Player 3	Player 4	Player 5	Player 6	Player 7	Player 8	Former Players
CSKA Pamir	(Cameroon) Alassa Mongbet	(Iran) Said Alireza	(Iran) Alireza Lotfi	(Iran) Rezo Telesarband	(Ivory Coast) Isamel Traore	(Russia) Sergey Doronin	(Togo) Ibrahim Baboni		(Ghana) Idriss Aminu (Ghana) Benjamin Asamoah (Ghana) Caleb Ofori-Manu (Ghana) Nerrick Tettey (Iran) Akil Jelizi Latif (Uzbekistan) Azamat Akhmedov
Eskhata	(Russia) Vladislav Shevchenko	(Russia) Roman Khibaba	(Uzbekistan) Olim Karimov	(Uzbekistan) Shakhzod Mamurdzhonov	(Uzbekistan) Sanjar Rihsiboev	(Uzbekistan) Jakhongir Safarov			(Uzbekistan) Shahzod Abdurakhimov (Uzbekistan) Uktamjon Hazratov (Uzbekistan) Dilshod Khushbakov
Fayzkand	(Azerbaijan) Elvin Mirzoev	(Azerbaijan) Ali Nouri	(Azerbaijan) Ilyas Safarzada	(Cameroon) Arsene Bilé Obama	(Cameroon) Arthur Bougnone	(Cameroon) Joseph Feumba	(Uzbekistan) Amirjon Safarov		(Iran) Hussein Ali Boboi (Uzbekistan) Miromil Lokaev (Uzbekistan) Anvar Murodov
Istaravshan	(Cameroon) Mbeke Siebatcheu	(Cameroon) Ngange Ntenge Dorian Serginho	(Uzbekistan) Oybek Akhmatov	(Uzbekistan) Jafar Ismoilov	(Uzbekistan) Mirzoxidjon Jalilov	(Uzbekistan) Ismoildzhon Okhundzhonov	(Uzbekistan) Javokhirbek Rasulov	(Uzbekistan) Otabek Zokirov	(Brazil) Patrick Felipe Justino Alves (Cameroon) Emmanuel Chiade (Uzbekistan) Nodirkhon Kamolov
Istiklol	(Argentina) Gonzalo Ritacco	(Belarus) Uladzislaw Kasmynin	(Ghana) Idriss Aminu	(Ukraine) Hlib Hrachov	(Ukraine) Temur Partsvania				(Gabon) Eric Bocoum (Russia) Nikita Chicherin (Uzbekistan) Mukhammad Isaev
Khatlon	(Cameroon) Tony Bikatal	(Cameroon) Jen Gaten	(Ghana) Kuaye Godson	(Ghana) Kofi Dwomoh	(Uzbekistan) Jamshidbek Khomidov	(Uzbekistan) Rustamjon Kuchkarov			
Khujand	(Russia) Sergei Garanzha	(Russia) Sergei Tskanyan	(Uzbekistan) Firdavs Abdusalimov	(Uzbekistan) Khushnudbek Bozorov	(Uzbekistan) Dinmuhammad Ochilov	(Uzbekistan) Samandar Ochilov	(Uzbekistan) Shahboz Salimbaev		(Belarus) Andrey Levkovets (Belarus) Ignatiy Sidor (Uzbekistan) Shokhrukh Makhmudkhozhiev
Ravshan Kulob	(Cameroon) Rostand Dior	(Ghana) Obed Owusu	(Ghana) Gbeku Prosper	(Ghana) Samuel Ofori (Defender)	(Ghana) Prince Arthur	(Ivory Coast) Kouassi Innocent	(Ivory Coast) Chris Emmanuel Kakou		(Cameroon) Temfak Platini
Ravshan Zafarobod	(Uzbekistan) Shakhzod Abdurakhimov	(Uzbekistan) Muchriddin Akhmedov	(Uzbekistan) Behruz Dustmurodov	(Uzbekistan) Javokhir Gaibullaev	(Uzbekistan) Jakhongir Kurbonboev	(Uzbekistan) Mirzhalol Kurbonov	(Uzbekistan) Sardor Matmurodov		(Uzbekistan) Zufarjon Akbaraliev (Uzbekistan) Dostonbek Berdikulov (Uzbekistan) Zufarjon Karakulov
Regar-TadAZ	(Uzbekistan) Khakim Alamkhonov	(Uzbekistan) Jasur Kurbonov	(Uzbekistan) Mirkomil Lokaev	(Uzbekistan) Anvar Murodov	(Uzbekistan) Sergey Prokhorov				(Uzbekistan) Savely Abramov (Uzbekistan) Jafar Ismoilov

In bold: Players that have been capped for their national team.

=== Managerial changes ===
Team	Outgoing manager	Manner of departure	Date of vacancy	Position in table	Incoming manager	Date of appointment
Istaravshan	(Iran) Reza Parkas		2 May 2022	7th	(Uzbekistan) Numon Khasanov	7 June 2022
Istiklol	(Tajikistan) Vitaly Levchenko	Contract Expired	27 June 2022	5th	(Tajikistan) Alisher Tukhtaev (Interim)	27 June 2022

== Regular season ==
=== League table ===
Pos	Team	Pld	W	D	L	GF	GA	GD	Pts	Qualification or relegation
1	Istiklol	18	11	6	1	38	11	+27	39	Qualification for Championship round
2	Khatlon	18	7	7	4	16	11	+5	28	Qualification for Championship round
3	Ravshan Kulob	18	7	7	4	19	16	+3	28	Qualification for Championship round
4	Khujand	18	7	6	5	21	13	+8	27	Qualification for Championship round
5	CSKA Pamir	18	7	4	7	22	24	−2	25	Qualification for Championship round
6	Fayzkand	18	6	4	8	18	29	−11	22	Below for Relegation Round
7	Istaravshan	18	6	4	8	23	19	+4	22	Below for Relegation Round
8	Eskhata	18	5	5	8	22	29	−7	20	Below for Relegation Round
9	Ravshan Zafarobod	18	4	7	7	20	35	−15	19	Below for Relegation Round
10	Regar-TadAZ	18	3	4	11	13	25	−12	13	Below for Relegation Round

Updated to match(es) played on 23 October 2022. Source: Soccerway
Rules for classification: 1) Points; 2) Head-to-head points; 3) Head-to-head goal difference; 4) Head-to-head goals scored; 5) Goal difference; 6) Goals scored.

=== Results ===
Home \ Away	CPD	ESK	FAY	ISA	IST	KHA	KJD	RAV	RZA	REG
CSKA Pamir		1–4	1–2	1–1	1–1	0–3	1–0	1–2	1–2	1–0
Eskhata	3–2		1–3	0–3	1–1	0–0	1–0	1–1	2–2	1–0
Fayzkand	2–2	1–3		0–5	1–3	0–1	0–0	0–0	2–1	2–1
Istaravshan	1–2	2–1	1–0		1–1	0–0	0–1	3–0	2–2	0–1
Istiklol	0–1	2–0	3–1	3–0		1–0	1–1	2–0	7–0	3–1
Khatlon	0–2	3–2	0–0	2–1	1–1		0–0	3–1	1–0	0–1
Khujand	1–2	1–1	3–0	1–0	1–2	1–0		0–0	3–0	1–1
Ravshan Kulob	1–0	2–0	3–0	1–0	0–0	1–1	2–3		1–1	3–0
Ravshan Zafarobod	0–2	2–0	1–3	2–1	0–4	0–0	2–1	2–2		0–0
Regar-TadAZ	1–1	3–1	0–1	1–2	1–3	0–1	0–3	0–1	2–2	

Updated to match(es) played on 23 October 2022. Source: Soccerway
Legend: Blue = home team win; Yellow = draw; Red = away team win.

=== Results by round ===
Team ╲ Round	1	2	3	4	5	6	7	8	9	10	11	12	13	14	15	16	17	18
CSKA Pamir	W	W	W	W	L	W	L	D	L	W	L	L	D	L	W	L	D	D
Eskhata	W	L	L	D	L	D	W	D	L	L	L	W	L	W	L	D	W	D
Fayzkand	L	W	D	L	L	W	W	D	L	D	W	W	W	L	D	L	L	L
Istaravshan	W	D	L	L	L	L	L	L	W	W	L	W	D	D	W	D	L	W
Istiklol	L	D	W	D	W	D	D	W	W	W	W	W	W	W	W	D	W	D
Khatlon	W	D	W	W	D	D	W	W	W	L	D	L	L	L	D	D	W	D
Khujand	L	W	D	L	D	D	D	W	W	D	W	L	W	W	L	W	L	D
Ravshan Kulob	L	D	W	D	W	D	W	D	W	D	W	L	L	W	D	W	L	D
Ravshan Zafarobod	D	L	L	D	W	L	L	L	L	L	D	L	W	D	D	W	W	D
Regar-TadAZ	D	L	L	W	W	D	L	L	L	D	L	W	L	L	L	L	D	D

Updated to match(es) played on 23 October 2022. Source:
W = Win; D = Draw; L = Loss; P = Postponed

== Championship round ==
=== Championship round table ===
Pos	Team	Pld	W	D	L	GF	GA	GD	Pts	Qualification or relegation
1	Istiklol (C)	22	14	6	2	46	13	+33	48	Qualification for AFC Champions League group stage
2	Ravshan Kulob	22	9	8	5	25	22	+3	35	Qualification for AFC Cup group stage
3	Khujand	22	9	7	6	29	18	+11	34	Qualification for AFC Cup play-off round
4	Khatlon	22	9	7	6	23	17	+6	34	
5	CSKA Pamir	22	7	4	11	30	34	−4	25	

Updated to match(es) played on 27 November 2022. Source: Soccerway
Rules for classification: 1) Points; 2) Head-to-head points; 3) Head-to-head goal difference; 4) Head-to-head goals scored; 5) Goal difference; 6) Goals scored.
(C) Champions

=== Results ===
Home \ Away	CPD	IST	KHA	KJD	RAV
CSKA Pamir		1–5			0–2
Istiklol			1–0	2–0	
Khatlon	4–3				3–0
Khujand	3–0		2–0		
Ravshan Kulob		1–0		3–3	

Updated to match(es) played on 23 November 2022. Source: Soccerway
Legend: Blue = home team win; Yellow = draw; Red = away team win.

=== Results by round ===
Team ╲ Round	1	2	3	4	5
CSKA Pamir	L	L	L	P	L
Istiklol	P	W	L	W	W
Khatlon	W	L	P	W	L
Khujand	D	P	W	L	W
Ravshan Kulob	D	W	W	L	P

Updated to match(es) played on 27 November 2022. Source:
W = Win; D = Draw; L = Loss; P = Postponed

== Relegation round ==
=== Relegation round table ===
Pos	Team	Pld	W	D	L	GF	GA	GD	Pts	Qualification or relegation
6	Fayzkand	22	8	4	10	25	34	−9	28	
7	Eskhata	22	7	6	9	29	32	−3	27	
8	Regar-TadAZ	22	7	4	11	23	26	−3	25	
9	Istaravshan	22	7	4	11	26	27	−1	25	Relegation to Tajik First Division
10	Ravshan Zafarobod	22	4	8	10	21	46	−25	20	Relegation to Tajik First Division

Updated to match(es) played on 20 November 2022. Source: Soccerway
Rules for classification: 1) Points; 2) Head-to-head points; 3) Head-to-head goal difference; 4) Head-to-head goals scored; 5) Goal difference; 6) Goals scored.

=== Results ===
Home \ Away	ESK	FAY	ISA	RZA	REG
Eskhata		-	3–0	1–1	-
Fayzkand	0–2		-	-	0–1
Istaravshan	-	1–3		2–0	-
Ravshan Zafarobod	-	1–4	-		0–5
Regar-TadAZ	2–1	-	2–0	-	

Updated to match(es) played on 20 November 2022. Source: Soccerway
Legend: Blue = home team win; Yellow = draw; Red = away team win.

=== Results by round ===
Team ╲ Round	1	2	3	4	5
Eskhata	D	L	W	W	P
Fayzkand	L	W	P	L	W
Istaravshan	P	L	L	W	L
Ravshan Zafarobod	D	P	L	L	L
Regar-TadAZ	W	W	W	P	W

Updated to match(es) played on 20 November 2022. Source:
W = Win; D = Draw; L = Loss; P = Postponed

== Season statistics ==
=== Scoring ===
- First goal of the season: Mbake Siyabatchu Deudoni for Istaravshan against Fayzkand. (2 April 2021)

=== Top scorers ===
As of matches played 20 November 2022

Rank	Player	Club	Goals
1	(Tajikistan) Manuchekhr Dzhalilov	Istiklol	16
2	(Tajikistan) Dilshod Bozorov	Eskhata	12
3	(Tajikistan) Jahongir Ergashev	Khujand	10
4	(Tajikistan) Shavkati Hotam	Fayzkand	9
4	(Tajikistan) Shervoni Mabatshoev	Istiklol	9
6	(Tajikistan) Abdukhalil Boronov	Ravshan Kulob	8
6	(Tajikistan) Nuriddin Khamrokulov	Khatlon	8
8	(Tajikistan) Bakhtiyor Zaripov	Ravshan Zafarobod	7
8	(Uzbekistan) Sanjar Rihsiboev	Eskhata	7
6	(Tajikistan) Amirjon Safarov	Istaravshan	6

Own goals:

- (Tajikistan) Manouchehr Ahmadov – Khujand vs Ravshan Zafarobod 10 April 2022
- (Tajikistan) Eraj Rajabov – Istiklol vs Ravshan Zafarobod 21 June 2022
- (Tajikistan) Komroni Mirzokhon – Istaravshan vs Ravshan Zafarobod 12 August 2022
- (Tajikistan) Komroni Mirzokhon – Istaravshan vs Ravshan Zafarobod 12 August 2022
- (Tajikistan) Eraj Rajabov – CSKA Pamir Dushanbe vs Eskhata Khujand 13 August 2022

=== Hat-tricks ===
Player	For	Against	Result	Date	Ref
(Tajikistan) Dilshod Bozorov	Eskhata	CSKA Pamir	1–4 (A)	14 May 2022	
(Tajikistan) Dilshod Bozorov	Eskhata	CSKA Pamir	3–2 (H)	13 August 2022	
(Tajikistan) Shervoni Mabatshoev	Istiklol	Istaravshan	3–0 (H)	31 August 2022	
(Tajikistan) Manuchekhr Dzhalilov	Istiklol	CSKA Pamir Dushanbe	1–5 (1)	27 November 2022	

=== Clean sheets ===
As of matches played 15 May 2022.

Rank	Player	Club	Clean sheets
1	(Ghana) Kuaye Godson	Khatlon	3
2	(Tajikistan) Husniddini Mahmadali	CSKA Pamir	2
2	(Tajikistan) Kurbonali Boboev	Istaravshan	2
2	(Tajikistan) Daler Barotov	Khujand	2
2	(Tajikistan) Shokhrukh Kirgizboev	Khujand	2
2	(Ghana) Gbeku Prosper	Ravshan Kulob	2
7	(Tajikistan) Mumindnon Gadoyboev	Eskhata	1
7	(Tajikistan) Akhliddin Khabibulloev	Fayzkand	1
7	(Tajikistan) Rustam Rizoev	Ravshan Kulob	1
7	(Tajikistan) Daler Azizov	Regar-TadAZ	1

== Awards ==
=== Monthly awards ===
Month	Manager of the Month		Player of the Month		References
Month	Manager	Club	Player	Club	References
April	(Tajikistan) Asliddin Khabibullaev	Khatlon	(Tajikistan) Fatkhullo Fatkhulloyev	Regar-TadAZ	
