= Nikita Chicherin =

Russian professional footballer

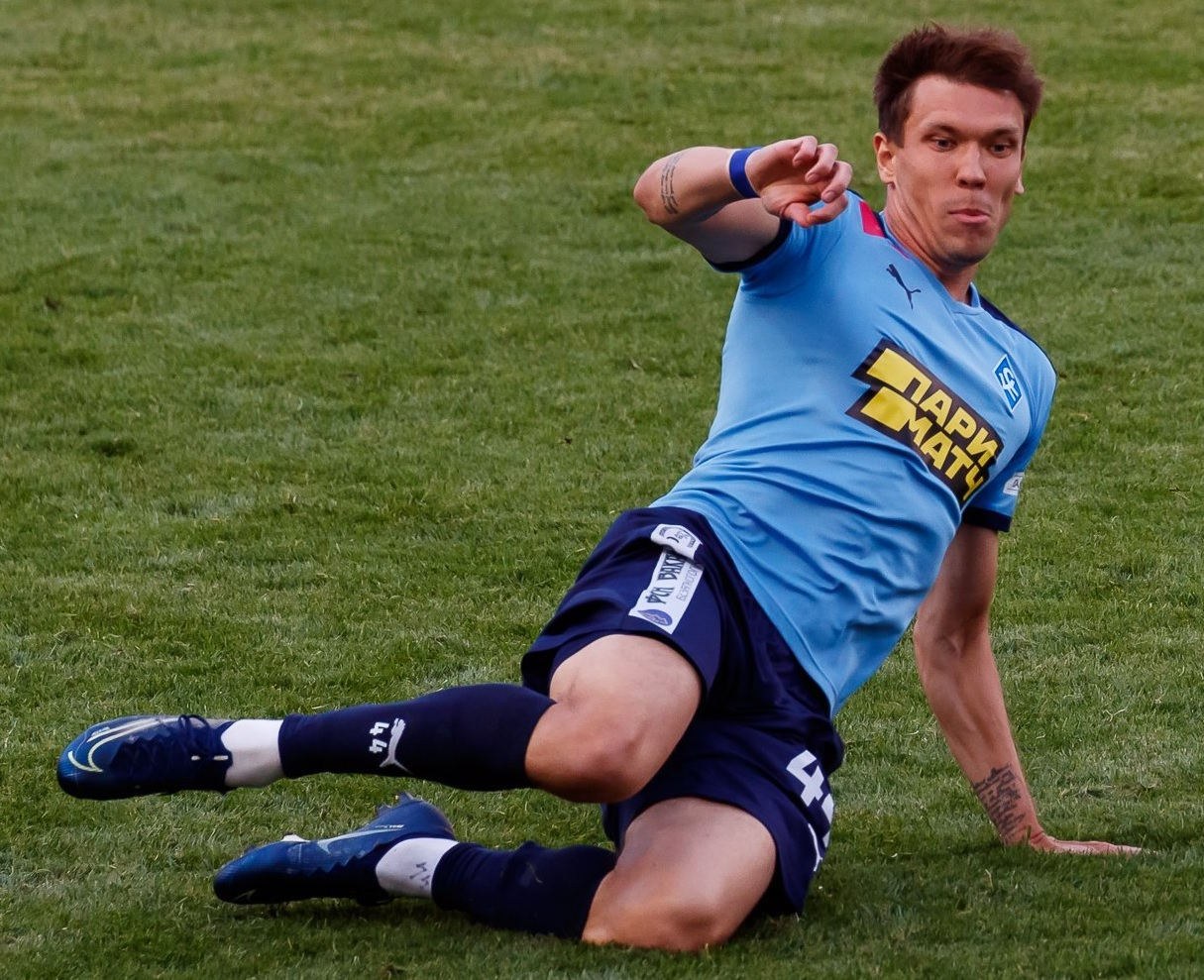
- Chicherin with Krylia Sovetov in 2020

Personal information
- Full name: Nikita Gennadyevich Chicherin
- Date of birth: 18 August 1990 (age 36)
- Place of birth: Moscow, Russian SFSR
- Height: 1.84 m (6 ft 0 in)
- Positions: Right-back; centre-back

Senior career*
Years	Team	Apps	(Gls)
2008–2013	Dynamo Moscow	19	(0)
2010	→ Khimki (loan)	36	(1)
2011	→ Sibir Novosibirsk (loan)	29	(0)
2012	→ Volga Nizhny Novgorod (loan)	10	(0)
2014	Volga Nizhny Novgorod	10	(0)
2014	Tom Tomsk	5	(0)
2015	Sakhalin Yuzhno-Sakhalinsk	1	(0)
2016	Mika	9	(1)
2016–2017	Yenisey Krasnoyarsk	39	(3)
2017	Kuban Krasnodar	0	(0)
2017–2018	Yenisey Krasnoyarsk	20	(1)
2018–2020	Krylia Sovetov	23	(0)
2020	Tambov	10	(0)
2021	Akron Tolyatti	13	(0)
2021–2022	Neftekhimik Nizhnekamsk	2	(0)
2022	Istiklol	5	(0)

International career
2009	Russia U19	6	(1)
2010–2013	Russia U21	28	(0)
- * Club domestic league appearances and goals

Nikita Gennadyevich Chicherin (Russian: Никита Геннадьевич Чичерин; born 18 August 1990) is a Russian former professional footballer who played as a right-back.

== Career ==
In March 2015, Chicherin signed for FC Sakhalin Yuzhno-Sakhalinsk.

On 31 March 2022, Istiklol confirmed the signing of Chicherin. On 6 July 2022, Istiklol announced that Chicherin had left the club after his contract had expired.

== Career statistics ==
=== Club ===
As of match played 26 June 2022

Club	Season	League			National Cup		Continental		Other		Total	
Club	Season	Division	Apps	Goals	Apps	Goals	Apps	Goals	Apps	Goals	Apps	Goals
Dynamo Moscow	2008	Russian Premier League	3	0	0	0	-		-		3	0
Dynamo Moscow	2009	Russian Premier League	0	0	0	0	-		-		0	0
Dynamo Moscow	2010	Russian Premier League	0	0	0	0	-		-		0	0
Dynamo Moscow	2011–12	Russian Premier League	8	0	0	0	-		-		8	0
Dynamo Moscow	2012–13	Russian Premier League	15	0	2	0	1	0	-		18	0
Dynamo Moscow	2013–14	Russian Premier League	2	0	0	0	-		-		2	0
Dynamo Moscow	Total		28	0	2	0	1	0	-	-	31	0
Khimki (loan)	2010	Russian Football National League	36	1	1	0	-		-		37	1
Sibir Novosibirsk (loan)	2011–12	Russian Football National League	29	0	0	0	-		-		29	0
Volga Nizhny Novgorod (loan)	2011–12	Russian Football National League	8	0	2	0	-		1 (Note: Appearances in the Russian Premier League Relegation play-offs)	0	11	0
Volga Nizhny Novgorod	2013–14	Russian Premier League	10	0	0	0	-		-		10	0
Tom Tomsk	2014–15	Russian Football National League	5	0	1	0	-		-		6	0
Sakhalin Yuzhno-Sakhalinsk	2014–15	Russian Football National League	1	0	0	0	-		-		1	0
Mika	2015–16	Armenian Premier League	9	1	3	0	-		-		12	1
Yenisey Krasnoyarsk	2016–17	Russian Football National League	37	3	2	0	-		2	0	41	3
Yenisey Krasnoyarsk	2017–18	Russian Football National League	20	1	2	1	-		2	0	24	2
Yenisey Krasnoyarsk	Total		57	4	4	1	-	-	4	0	65	5
Krylia Sovetov	2018–19	Russian Premier League	17	0	1	1	-		0	0	21	1
Krylia Sovetov	2019–20	Russian Premier League	6	0	1	0	-		-		7	0
Krylia Sovetov	Total		23	0	2	1	-	-	0	0	25	1
Tambov	2020–21	Russian Premier League	10	0	0	0	-		-		10	0
Akron Tolyatti	2020–21	Russian Football National League	13	1	0	0	-		-		13	1
Neftekhimik Nizhnekamsk	2021–22	Russian Football National League	2	0	0	0	-		-		2	0
Istiklol	2022	Tajikistan Higher League	5	0	0	0	6 (Note: Appearances in the AFC Champions League)	0	1 (Note: Appearances in the Tajik Supercup)	0	12	0
Career total			236	7	15	2	7	0	6	0	255	9

== Honors ==
Istiklol

- Tajik Supercup (1): 2022
