= Gonzalo Ritacco =

Argentine footballer

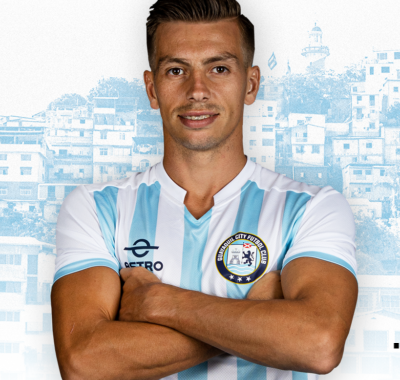

Personal information
- Full name: Gonzalo Gabriel Ritacco
- Date of birth: 21 May 1992 (age 34)
- Place of birth: Pilar, Argentina
- Height: 1.75 m (5 ft 9 in)
- Position: Attacking midfielder

Team information
- Current team: Real España
- Number: 7

Senior career*
| Years | Team | Apps | (Gls) |
| 2013–2014 | Defensores de Belgrano | 6 | (0) |
| 2014 | Argentino de Merlo | 4 | (0) |
| 2016–2018 | Defensores Unidos | 58 | (6) |
| 2018 | Orense | 19 | (3) |
| 2019 | Rampla Juniors | 0 | (0) |
| 2019 | Manta | 8 | (3) |
| 2020 | Guayaquil City | 0 | (0) |
| 2020 | 9 de Octubre | 6 | (0) |
| 2021 | Rodos | 7 | (1) |
| 2021 | Delfín | 4 | (0) |
| 2022 | Qizilqum | 7 | (0) |
| 2022 | Istiklol | 12 | (4) |
| 2023 | Deportivo Táchira | 27 | (8) |
| 2024 | Cienciano | 30 | (1) |
| 2025 | Deportivo Pasto | 12 | (0) |
| 2026– | Real España | 2 | (1) |
- * Club domestic league appearances and goals as of 5 February 2026

Gonzalo Gabriel Ritacco (born 21 May 1992) is an Argentine professional footballer who plays as an attacking midfielder for Liga Nacional club Real España.

== Career ==
Ritacco started his career with Argentine third-tier side Defensores de Belgrano, where he made 8 league appearances and scored 0 goals. In 2014, he signed for Argentino de Merlo in the Argentine fourth tier. In 2018, Ritacco signed for Ecuadorian second-tier club Orense. Before the 2019 season, he signed for Rampla Juniors in the Uruguayan top flight. In 2019, he signed for Ecuadorian second-tier team Manta. Before the 2020 season, Ritacco signed for Guayaquil City in the Ecuadorian top flight.

In 2020, he signed for Ecuadorian second tier outfit 9 de Octubre. Before the second half of 2020–21, he signed for Rodos in Greece. In 2021, Ritacco signed for Ecuadorian side Delfín. Before the 2022 season, he signed for Qizilqum in Uzbekistan. In 2022, he signed for Tajikistani club Istiklol.

== Honours ==
Defensores Unidos

- Primera C: 2017–18

9 de Octubre

- Ecuadorian Serie B: 2020

Istiklol

- Tajikistan Higher League: 2022
- Tajikistan Cup: 2022

Deportivo Táchira

- Venezuelan Primera División: 2023
