= Islom Zoirov =

Tajikistani professional football player

Personal information
- Full name: Islom Babaevich Zoirov
- Date of birth: 12 January 2002 (age 24)
- Place of birth: Kulyab, Tajikistan
- Height: 1.78 m (5 ft 10 in)
- Position: Forward

Team information
- Current team: Barkchi Hisor
- Number: 7

Youth career
- Lokomotiv-Pamir

Senior career*
Years	Team	Apps	(Gls)
2020	Lokomotiv-Pamir	12	(3)
2021–2022	Istiklol	29	(3)
2024	Media Football League		
2024–2025	Khosilot Farkhor	27	(5)
2026–	Barkchi Hisor	1	(0)

International career^{‡}
2019–	Tajikistan U17		
2020–	Tajikistan	8	(1)
- * Club domestic league appearances and goals as of 16 March 2026 ‡ National team caps and goals as of 14:33, 29 March 2022 (UTC)

Islom Zoirov (Tajik: ‌Ислом Зоиров, Russian: Ислом Зоиров, born 12 January 2002) is a Tajikistani professional football player who currently plays for Barkchi Hisor.

== Career ==
=== Club ===
In February 2020, Zoirov went on trial with Spartak-2 Moscow.

On 10 February 2021, Istiklol announced that Zoirov had joined the club on trial, before being announced as having signed for the club on 29 March 2021.

=== International ===
Zoirov captained the Tajikistan U17 team at the 2019 FIFA U-17 World Cup in Brazil.

Zoirov made his senior team debut on 7 November 2020 against Bahrain.

== Career statistics ==
=== Club ===
As of match played 3 July 2022

Club	Season	League			National Cup		Continental		Other		Total	
Club	Season	Division	Apps	Goals	Apps	Goals	Apps	Goals	Apps	Goals	Apps	Goals
Istiklol	2021	Tajikistan Higher League	23	2	4	0	1 (Note: Appearances in the AFC Champions League)	0	0 (Note: Appearances in the Tajik Supercup)	0	28	2
Istiklol	2022	Tajikistan Higher League	6	1	0	0	5	0	1	0	12	1
Istiklol	Total		29	3	4	0	6	0	1	0	40	3
Career total			29	3	4	0	6	0	1	0	40	3

=== International ===
Tajikistan national team
Year	Apps	Goals
2020	2	0
2021	5	1
2022	1	0
Total	8	1

Statistics accurate as of match played 29 March 2022

Scores and results list Tajikistan's goal tally first.

#	Date	Venue	Opponent	Score	Result	Competition
1.	29 May 2021	Khalid bin Mohammed Stadium, Sharjah, United Arab Emirates	Thailand	2–2	2–2	Friendly

== Honours ==
Istiklol

- Tajikistan Higher League (1): 2021
- Tajik Supercup (1): 2022
