= Shervoni Mabatshoyev =

Tajikistani footballer

Personal information
- Full name: Shervoni Uvaydoyevich Mabatshoyev
- Date of birth: 4 December 2000 (age 25)
- Place of birth: Dushanbe, Tajikistan
- Height: 1.83 m (6 ft 0 in)
- Position: Forward

Team information
- Current team: Istiklol
- Number: 88

Senior career*
Years	Team	Apps	(Gls)
2017–2018	Barkchi		
2019–2021	CSKA Pamir Dushanbe		
2021–2025	Istiklol	73	(28)
2025	Kapaz	15	(2)
2025–2026	Regar-TadAZ	7	(3)
2026	Terengganu	5	(1)
2026–	Istiklol	0	(0)

International career^{‡}
2018–	Tajikistan	39	(13)
- * Club domestic league appearances and goals as of 07:24, 13 April 2026 (UTC) ‡ National team caps and goals as of 16:45, 18 November 2025 (UTC)

Shervoni Uvaydoyevich Mabatshoyev (Tajik: Шервонӣ Увайдоевич Мабатшоев, Russian: Шервони Увайдоевич Мабатшоев; born 4 December 2000) is a Tajik professional footballer who plays as a forward for Tajikistan Higher League club Istiklol.

== Career ==
=== Club ===
On 19 July 2021, Istiklol announced the signing of Mabatshoyev to a two-year contract from CSKA Pamir Dushanbe.

On 16 January 2025, Istiklol announced that Mabatshoyev had left the club to sign a 18-month contract with Kapaz. On 28 July 2025, Kapaz announced that Mabatshoyev had left the club after his contract was terminated by mutual agreement.

On 28 July 2025, Mabatshoyev returned to the Tajikistan Higher League, signing for Regar-TadAZ.

On 15 July 2026, Tajikistan Higher League club Istiklol announced the return to the club of Mabatshoyev, to a one-year contract.

=== International ===
Mabatshoyev made his senior team debut on 13 December 2018 against Oman.

== Career statistics ==
=== Club ===
As of match played 18 May 2025

Club	Season	League			National Cup		Continental		Other		Total	
Club	Season	Division	Apps	Goals	Apps	Goals	Apps	Goals	Apps	Goals	Apps	Goals
Istiklol	2021	Tajikistan Higher League	13	6	5	1	1 (Note: Appearances in the AFC Champions League)	0	0 (Note: Appearances in the Tajik Supercup)	0	19	7
Istiklol	2022	Tajikistan Higher League	19	12	5	2	6	0	1	0	31	14
Istiklol	2023	Tajikistan Higher League	22	5	5	1	6	0	1	0	34	6
Istiklol	2024	Tajikistan Higher League	19	5	6	3	6 (Note: Appearances in the AFC Champions League Two)	0	1	0	32	8
Istiklol	Total		73	28	21	7	19	0	3	0	116	35
Kapaz	2024–25	Azerbaijan Premier League	15	2	2	0	-		-		17	2
Career total			88	30	23	7	19	0	3	0	133	37

=== International ===
Tajikistan national team
Year	Apps	Goals
2018	2	0
2019	0	0
2020	0	0
2021	1	0
2022	8	3
2023	6	0
2024	12	3
2025	10	7
Total	39	13

Statistics accurate as of match played 18 November 2025

As of match played 18 November 2025
Scores and results list Tajikistan's goal tally first.

No.	Date	Venue	Opponent	Score	Result	Competition
1.	8 June 2022	Dolen Omurzakov Stadium, Bishkek, Kyrgyzstan	Myanmar	1–0	4–0	2023 AFC Asian Cup qualification
2.	8 June 2022	Dolen Omurzakov Stadium, Bishkek, Kyrgyzstan	Myanmar	3–0	4–0	2023 AFC Asian Cup qualification
3.	11 June 2022	Dolen Omurzakov Stadium, Bishkek, Kyrgyzstan	Singapore	1–0	1–0	2023 AFC Asian Cup qualification
4.	11 June 2024	Pamir Stadium, Dushanbe, Tajikistan	Pakistan	1–0	3–0	2026 FIFA World Cup qualification
5.	13 November 2024	Pamir Stadium, Dushanbe, Tajikistan	Nepal	2–0	4–0	Friendly
6.	13 November 2024	Pamir Stadium, Dushanbe, Tajikistan	Nepal	4–0	4–0	Friendly
7.	10 June 2025	New Clark City Stadium, Capas, Philippines	Philippines	1–1	2–2	2027 AFC Asian Cup qualification
8.	1 September 2025	Hisor Central Stadium, Hisor, Tajikistan	Afghanistan	2–0	2–0	2025 CAFA Nations Cup
9.	9 October 2025	Hisor Central Stadium, Hisor, Tajikistan	Maldives	2–0	2–0	2027 AFC Asian Cup qualification
10.	14 October 2025	National Football Stadium, Malé, Maldives	Maldives	2–0	3–0	2027 AFC Asian Cup qualification
11.	14 October 2025	National Football Stadium, Malé, Maldives	Maldives	3–0	3–0	2027 AFC Asian Cup qualification
12.	18 November 2025	Territory Rugby League Stadium, Darwin, Australia	Timor-Leste	1–0	5–0	2027 AFC Asian Cup qualification
13.	18 November 2025	Territory Rugby League Stadium, Darwin, Australia	Timor-Leste	3–0	5–0	2027 AFC Asian Cup qualification

== Honours ==
Istiklol

- Tajikistan Higher League (4): 2021, 2022, 2023 2024
- Tajikistan Cup (2): 2022, 2023
- Tajik Supercup (2): 2022, 2024

Tajikistan

- King's Cup: 2022
