= Ignatiy Sidor =

Belarusian footballer

Personal information
- Date of birth: 21 August 1998 (age 28)
- Place of birth: Zhodino, Minsk Oblast, Belarus
- Height: 1.98 m (6 ft 6 in)
- Position: Defender

Team information
- Current team: Slutsk
- Number: 21

Youth career
- 2015–2017: Torpedo-BelAZ Zhodino

Senior career*
Years	Team	Apps	(Gls)
2017–2019	Torpedo-BelAZ Zhodino	1	(0)
2018	→ Granit Mikashevichi (loan)	8	(0)
2019	→ Lida (loan)	18	(0)
2020	Smorgon	23	(1)
2021	Krumkachy Minsk	31	(3)
2022	Khujand	2	(0)
2022–2025	Naftan Novopolotsk	58	(3)
2026–	Slutsk	8	(0)
- * Club domestic league appearances and goals as of 6 July 2026

Ignatiy Sidor (Belarusian: Ігнацій Сідар; Russian: Игнатий Сидор; born 21 August 1998) is a Belarusian professional footballer who plays for Slutsk.

== Career ==
On 18 July 2022, Khujand announced that Sidor had left the club by mutual agreement having played three times for the club.
