= 2022 Tajikistan Cup =

Football competition in Tajikistan

Tournament details
- Country: Tajikistan
- Dates: 24 May 2021 – 9 December 2021
- Teams: 22

Final positions
- Champions: Istiklol
- Runners-up: Kuktosh Rudaki

Tournament statistics
- Matches played: 23
- Goals scored: 90 (3.91 per match)
- Top goal scorer: Akbar Bobomurodov (4)
- All statistics correct as of 9 December 2021.

The 2022 Tajikistan Cup was the 31st edition of the Tajikistan Cup, the knockout football tournament of Tajikistan, with the winner of the cup qualifying for the 2023-24 AFC Cup. In the final, Istiklol defeated Kuktosh Rudaki 5:4 on penalties after the game resulted in a 2:2 draw.

== Final ==
29 October 2022
(UTC+5)

Istiklol	2–2 (a.e.t.)	Kuktosh Rudaki
Sobirov 38' (o.g.); Dzhalilov 72'; Sulaymonov (yellow card); Kasmynin (yellow card); Asrorov (yellow card); Hrachov (yellow card); Karomatullozoda (yellow card)	Report	Gulaev 3'; Uzokov 61' (yellow card); Giyosov (yellow card); Karaev (yellow card)
Penalties
Asrorov (penalty scored); Mabatshoev (penalty missed); Sulaymonov (penalty scored); Ritacco (penalty scored); M.Dzhalilov (penalty scored); Hrachov (penalty scored)	5–4	(penalty scored) Uzokov; (penalty missed) Sobirov; (penalty scored) Shukurov; (penalty scored) Sultonov; (penalty scored) Karaev; (penalty scored) Gulaev

Pakhtakor Stadium, Bokhtar
Attendance: 6,500
Referee: Sayvali Turdiev
