= List of foreign football players in Tajikistan =

This is a list of foreign football players in the Tajik League, which commenced play in 1992. The following players must meet both of the following two criteria:

1. Have played at least one Tajik League game. Players who were signed by Tajik League clubs, but only played in lower league, cup and/or Asian games, or did not play in any competitive games at all, are not included.
2. Are considered foreign, i.e., outside Tajikistan, determined by the following:

A player is considered foreign if he is not eligible to play for the national team of Tajikistan.

More specifically,

- If a player has been capped on international level, the national team is used; if he has been capped by more than one country, the highest level (or the most recent) team is used.
- If a player has not been capped on international level, his country of birth is used, except those who were born abroad from Tajikistan.

In bold: Current foreign Tajik League players and their present team.

As of 31 December 2024

== Naturalized players (Note: Players that have been born abroad, moved to Tajikistan later than the age of twelve, acquired Tajik citizenship and waived the opportunity to play for the national teams of their native countries in order to be eligible to play for Tajikistan) ==
- (Russia) Rustam Yatimov – Istiklol (2018–2024)

== AFC ==
=== Afghanistan ===
- Khomid Golami – Istiklol (2017)

=== Australia ===
- Matthew Millar – Istiklol (2024)

=== Iran ===
- Muhammad Charogidorichuri — CSKA Pamir
- Hasan Huseini — CSKA Pamir (2017)
- **Aghil Jalizi** — CSKA Pamir (2022-)
- Mehdi Jalizi — CSKA Pamir (2017)
- **Hussein Ali Boboi** — **Fayzkand** (2022–)
- Mehdi Chahjouyi – Istiklol (2015–2016), Khujand (2016)
- Amir Memari Manesh – Dushanbe-83 (2021)
- Behrouz Pakniat — Khayr Vakhdat (2011)
- Hossein Sohrabi – Khayr Vakhdat (2012), Istiklol (2013), Khayr Vahdat (2014), Ravshan Kulob (2015)
- Arash Akbari — Regar-TadAZ (2019–2022), Fayzkand (2021)
- Muhammad Gulipour – Regar-TadAZ (2011), Khayr Vakhdat (2012, 2015), Khujand (2013)

=== Japan ===
- Ryota Noma – Istiklol (2021)
- Keita Suzuki – Istiklol (2024)

=== Kyrgyzstan ===
- Daniel Tagoe – Dushanbe-83 (2021)
- Vladislav Volkov — Khayr Vakhdat (2013–2014)
- Vladimir Verevkin — Khayr Vakhdat (2015)
- Valery Kashuba — Khujand (2015)
- Tursunali Rustamov — Khujand (2014, 2019)
- David Tetteh – Regar-TadAZ (2006–2008)
- Elijah Ari – Vakhsh Qurghonteppa (2010), Regar-TadAZ (2011, 2013–2015), Energetik Dushanbe (2012)

=== Turkmenistan ===
- Rahat Japarow — CSKA Pamir (2021)
- Wahyt Orazsähedow — FC Istiklol (2020)

=== Uzbekistan ===
- **Azamat Akhmedov** — CSKA Pamir (2022-)
- Jasur Ashurov — Fayzkand (2020)
- Dilshodzhon Baratov — Fayzkand (2020–2021)
- Orzubek Buriev — CSKA Pamir (2021)
- **Shahzod Abdurakhimov** — **Eskhata** (2021–)
- **Uktamjon Hazratov** — **Eskhata** (2022–)
- **Dilshod Khushbakov** — **Eskhata** (2022–)
- Akhror Inoyatov — Eskhata (2021)
- Akobir Turaev — Eskhata (2021), Ravshan Kulob (2023)
- Jasur Kurbonov — Fayzkand (2020, 2021)
- **Miromil Lokaev** — **Fayzkand** (2022–)
- **Anvar Murodov** — **Fayzkand** (2020–2021, 2022), Ravshan (2021)
- Azizdzhon Zaripov — Fayzkand (2020)
- Jamshed Khasanov — Istaravshan (2019)
- **Jafar Ismoilov** — Istaravshan (2021), **Regar-TadAZ** (2022–)
- **Nodirkhon Kamolov** — **Istaravshan** (2022–)
- **Shakhzod Mamurdzhonov** — Istaravshan (2021), **Eskhata** (2022–)
- Khurshid Olimov — Istaravshan (2021)
- **Javokhirbek Rasulov** — **Istaravshan** (2022–)
- **Jakhongir Safarov** — Istaravshan (2021), **Eskhata** (2022–)
- Shakhzod Shamsiddinov — Istaravshan (2021)
- Akhrorbek Uktamov — Istaravshan (2021)
- **Otabek Zokirov** — **Istaravshan** (2022–)
- Zufardjon Akbaraliev — Istaravshan (2020)
- Saiddoston Fozilov — Istaravshan (2020)
- Shakhzod Shamsiddinov — Istaravshan (2020)
- Tulkinjon Umarov — Istaravshan (2019–2020)
- Jahongir Abdumominov — Istiklol (2018)
- **Mukhammad Isaev** — **Istiklol** (2022–)
- Jalil Kimsanov — Istiklol (2019), Regar-TadAZ (2020)
- Davron Mirzaev — Istiklol (2014), Regar-TadAZ (2015)
- **Jamshidbek Khomidov** — Khatlon (2022-)
- **Rustamjon Kuchkarov** — Khatlon (2022-)
- Asiljon Begimkulov — Khujand (2019–)
- **Firdavs Abdusalimov** — **Khujand** (2021–)
- Mamur Ikramov — Khujand (2020)
- Olim Karimov — Khujand (2021)
- **Siroj Khamrayev** — **Khujand** (2020–)
- **Shokhrukh Makhmudkhozhiev** — **Khujand** (2020–)
- **Samandar Ochilov** — **Khujand** (2020–)
- Sanjar Rihsiboev — Khujand (2020), **Eskhata** (2022–)
- **Amirjon Safarov** — **Khujand** (2020–2021), **Fayzkand** (2022–)
- Andrey Sidorov — Khujand (2020)
- Nodirbek Ibragimov — Kuktosh Rudaki (2019, 2021), CSKA Pamir Dushanbe (2020), Ravshan (2021)
- Abbos Ikromov — Kuktosh Rudaki (2020), Fayzkand (2020)
- Alizhon Alizhonov — Kuktosh (2021)
- Asadbek Islomov — Kuktosh (2021)
- Muhiddin Odilov — Kuktosh (2019-2021)
- Sukhrob Rakhmonov — Kuktosh (2021)
- Bunyod Shodiev — Ravshan (2021), Kuktosh (2021)
- Behzod Turdikulov — Parvoz Bobojon (2012)
- Mukhriddin Akhmedov — Ravshan Kulob (2021), Ravshan Zafarobod (2022-)
- **Zufarjon Akbaraliev** — **Ravshan Zafarobod** (2022–)
- **Muchriddin Akhmedov** — **Ravshan Zafarobod** (2022–)
- **Dostonbek Berdikulov** — **Ravshan Zafarobod** (2022–)
- **Behruz Dustmurodov** — **Ravshan Zafarobod** (2022–)
- **Javokhir Gaibullaev** — **Ravshan Zafarobod** (2022–)
- **Zufarjon Karakulov** — **Ravshan Zafarobod** (2022–)
- Abbos Abdulloyev — Regar-TadAZ (2006–2007)
- Sayriddin Gafforov — Regar-TadAZ (2012), Ravshan Kulob (2013–2014), Khosilot (2017)
- Sardor Eminov – Regar-TadAZ (2008–2013, 2020)
- Farrukh Nurliboev – Regar-TadAZ (2019–2020)
- Bahrom Umarov – Regar-TadAZ
- Farkhod Yuldoshev – Regar-TadAZ (2007, 2012–2013), Vakhsh Qurghonteppa (2009–2010), Istiklol (2011), Istaravshan (2014)
- **Savely Abramov** — **Regar-TadAZ** (2022–)
- **Sergey Prokhorov** — **Ravshan Zafarobod** (2022–)

== CAF ==
=== Cameroon ===
- Luc Mendjana — Dushanbe-83 (2021), CSKA Pamir (2021)
- Yavis Noah Parfat — Dushanbe-83 (2020)
- **Joseph Feumba** — Istaravshan (2020), Fayzkand (2020–)
- **Arsene Bilé Obama** — **Fayzkand** (2022–)
- **Arthur Bougnone** — **Fayzkand** (2021–)
- Junior Onana — Fayzkand (2021)
- **Emmanuel Chiade** — **Istaravshan** (2022–)
- **Ngange Ntenge Dorian Serginho** — **Istaravshan** (2022–)
- Mbeke Siebatcheu — **Istaravshan** (2020, 2022–), Kuktosh (2020)
- **Tony Bikatal** — **Khatlon** (2020–)
- **Jen Gaten** — **Khatlon** (2020–)
- Alassa Mfuapon — Khatlon (2020)
- **Asomini Zbenezer** — **Khatlon** (2021–)
- Gock Habib — Khayr Vakhdat (2013)
- Paul Rolland — Khayr Vakhdat (2013–2014)
- Olivier Mbom — Kuktosh (2021)
- Dior Rostan — Ravshan Kulob (2022)
- Temfack Platini — Ravshan Kulob (2022)

=== Gabon ===
- **Eric Bocoum** — **Istiklol** (2022–)

=== Ghana ===
- Felix Baffoe – Energetik Dushanbe (2012), Ravshan (2013)
- Gabriel Dontoh – CSKA Pamir (2009–2010,2013–2015), Energetik Dushanbe (2011–2013)
- Eiya Edward — CSKA Pamir (2019)
- Alex Peprah — CSKA Pamir (2021)
- Felix Tette — CSKA Pamir (2021)
- **Caleb Ofori-Manu** — CSKA Pamir (2022-)
- **Benjamin Asamoah** — Dushanbe-83 (2018), Khayr Vahdat (2019), Lokomotiv-Pamir (2020), Kuktosh Rudaki (2020), Ravshan (2021), **CSKA Pamir** (2022–)
- Collins Aduhene — Dushanbe-83 (2020)
- **Iddris Aminu** — Dushanbe-83 (2020), **CSKA Pamir** (2019–2020, 2021–)
- **Nerrick Tettey** — Dushanbe-83 (2021) **CSKA Pamir** (2022–)
- Misiam Innocent – Khayr Vahdat (2016), CSKA Pamir (2017), Kuktosh Rudaki (2019)
- Daniel Mensah – Khayr Vahdat (2015)
- Asomini Ebenezer – Khatlon (2021)
- William Gyan – Khujand (2010), Energetik Dushanbe (2011–2014)
- Benjamin Awuku – Istiklol (2013), Khujand (2014), Ravshan (2015), Istaravshan (2015)
- Agbley Jones – Khayr Vahdat (2016), Khosilot Farkhor (2017), Regar-TadAZ (2017), Khujand (2018), Dushanbe-83 (2020–2021)
- Emmanuel Kudiabor — Khayr Vahdat (2018), Dushanbe-83(2020)
- Idan Ocran — Kuktosh Rudaki (2018), CSKA Pamir (2021), Ravshan Kulob (2023)
- Ishmael Klotey — Kuktosh Rudaki (2019–2020)
- Prince Arthur — Kuktosh Rudaki (2019–2020), Ravshan Kulob (2022), Regar-TadAZ (2023)
- Misiam Inocent — Kuktosh Rudaki (2019)
- Avuku Kaleb Oduro — Lokomotiv-Pamir (2020), Kuktosh Rudaki (2020)
- **Kuaye Godson** – Panjshir (2019), **Khatlon**(2020–)
- Sadiq Musa – Ravshan (2012–2015), Istaravshan (2015), Khosilot Farkhor (2016–2017), Regar-TadAZ (2017), Dushanbe-83 (2020–2021)
- Gershon Kwasi Akuffo – Ravshan (2013, 2015), Regar-TadAZ (2013), Istaravshan (2015), Khosilot Farkhor (2016–2017), Regar-TadAZ (2017)
- Benjamin Amankwah – Ravshan (2012), Khujand (2013–2014)
- Kingsley Osei Effah — Ravshan (2021)
- Emmanuel Maaboah — Ravshan (2023)
- David Mawutor – Ravshan (2012–2013), Istiklol (2014, 2016–2017)
- Obed Owusu — Ravshan (2021)
- **Gbeku Prosper** — **Ravshan Kulob** (2022–)
- **Samuel Ofori** — **Ravshan Kulob** (2022–)
- Solomon Takyi – Ravshan (2012–2014), Istaravshan (2014–2015), Energetik Dushanbe (2015), Khosilot Farkhor (2016)
- **Prince Viredu** — **Ravshan Kulob** (2022–)
- Charles Narkotey – Regar-TadAZ (2007–2009), CSKA Pamir Dushanbe (2010–2012), Khujand (2014)
- David Davidson – Vakhsh Qurghonteppa (2010)
- Silvanus Evans Gbeti – Vakhsh Qurghonteppa (2013), Istiklol (2014), Khujand (2014), Dushanbe-83(2020)
- Laud Quartey – Vakhsh Qurghonteppa (2014)
- Joseph Akomadi – Ravshan Kulob (2023)

=== Guinea ===
- Alia Sylla – Energetik Dushanbe (2013), CSKA Pamir Dushanbe (2014)

=== Ivory Coast ===
- Azian Joseph Adolph – Dushanbe-83 (2020)
- Cédric Gogoua – Istiklol (2023)
- Ya Saturnin-Hermann — Kuktosh (2021)
- Kouassi Innocent — Ravshan Kulob (2022)
- **Chris Emmanuel Kakou** — **Ravshan Kulob** (2022–)
- Senin Sebai – Istiklol (2023)

=== Nigeria ===
- Blessing Eleke – Istiklol (2024)
- Joseph Okoro – Istiklol (2023)

=== Tanzania ===
- **Emmanuel Mwanengo** – Ravshan Kulob (2023), **Vakhsh Bokhtar** (2024-)

=== Uganda ===
- Eugene Sseppuya – Istiklol (2013)

== CONCACAF ==
=== United States ===
- Troy Ready – Vakhsh Qurghonteppa (2009–2013)

== CONMEBOL ==
=== Argentina ===
- Gonzalo Ritacco – Istiklol (2022)

=== Brazil ===
- Patrick Felipe Justino Alves — Istaravshan (2022)
- Glaúber da Silva – Istiklol (2013–2014)
- Murilo Souza – Istiklol (2024)
- Jocimar Nascimento – Istiklol (2014)
- Willer – Istiklol (2013–2014)
- Elton Luis – Regar-TadAZ (2013–2015)
- Fabricio Tocha – Regar-TadAZ (2013)
- Jailton – Regar-TadAZ (2007–2008, 2009–2012)

== UEFA ==
=== Albania ===
- Rudolf Turkaj — Istiklol (2025)

=== Armenia ===
- Sarkis Karapetyan — CSKA Pamir (2017)
- Artur Kartashyan – Istiklol (2023)
- Ruslan Koryan — Istiklol (2019)

=== Belarus ===
- Uladzislaw Kasmynin – Istiklol (2022)
- Sergey Tikhonovsky — Istiklol (2018)
- Mikalay Zyanko — Istiklol (2018)
- Valeri Tsyganenko — Khujand (2011)
- Andrey Levkovets — Khujand (2022)
- Ignatiy Sidor — Khujand (2022)

=== Bosnia and Herzegovina ===
- Dženis Beganović – Istiklol (2023–2024)

=== Bulgaria ===
- Dimitar Mitkov – Istiklol (2024)
- Petar Patev — Istiklol (2021)

=== Croatia ===
- Ivan Novoselec – Istiklol (2023–2024)

=== Estonia ===
- Aleksei Matrossov — Khujand (2018, 2021)

=== Georgia ===
- Tornike Dzhimsheleishvili — Khujand (2019)
- Davit Kupatadze — Khujand (2019)

=== Germany ===
- Alexander Frank – Istiklol (2012–2013)

=== Italy ===
- Francesco Margiotta – Istiklol (2024)

=== Kazakhstan ===
- Maksim Grek – Khujand (2021)

=== Latvia ===
- Dmitrijs Medeckis — Khayr Vahdat (2015)

=== Moldova ===
- Ion Arabadji — Dushanbe-83 (2021)
- Stanislav Ivanov — Dushanbe-83 (2021)
- Oleg Andronic — Khujand (2013–2014)
- Valeriu Andronic — Khujand (2013–2014)

=== Netherlands ===
- Hüseyin Doğan – Istiklol (2021)

=== North Macedonia ===
- Darko Ilieski – Istiklol (2024)

=== Russia ===
- Sergey Doronin — CSKA Pamir (2022)
- Yegor Khokhlov — CSKA Pamir (2019)
- Igor Surov — CSKA Pamir (2017)
- Mikhail Zaitsev — CSKA Pamir (2019)
- Dmitry Barkov — Istiklol (2017)
- Nikita Chicherin – Istiklol (2022)
- Shams Dzhumabaev — Istiklol (2009)
- Aleksandr Kudryashov — Istiklol (2011–2013)
- Artyom Petrenko — Istiklol (2013)
- Ruslan Rafikov — Istiklol (2011–2012), Khujand (2013)
- Dzhamshed Rakhmonov — Istiklol (2019–2020)
- Viktor Svezhov — Istiklol (2020)
- Oleg Yezhurov — Istiklol (2011), Parvoz Bobojon (2012)
- Robert Zhilin — Istiklol (2011), CSKA Pamir (2013)
- Tohir Artikboev — Khujand (2017)
- Artyom Serdyuk — Khujand (2021)
- **Sergey Tskanyan** — **Khujand** (2022, 2024-)
- Ruslan Arkhipov — Parvoz Bobojon (2012)
- Artur Kamaleev — Parvoz Bobojon (2012)
- Artem Kozlov — Parvoz Bobojon (2012)
- Ruslan Kuznetsov — Parvoz Bobojon (2012), Khujand (2013), Regar-TadAZ (2014)
- Musa Ibragimov — Ravshan (2021)
- Denis Dereshev — Regar-TadAZ (2004)
- Ivan Dyagolchenko — Regar-TadAZ (2005)
- Rustam Idrisov — Regar-TadAZ (2011)
- Leonid Romanov — Regar-TadAZ (2011), Regar-TadAZ (2011)

=== Serbia ===
- Mihajlo Cakić – Istiklol (2019)
- Slavko Lukić – Istiklol (2024)
- Marko Milić – Istiklol (2020)
- **Nikola Stošić** – **Istiklol** (2013–2020, 2024–)

=== Spain ===
- José Ballester – Istiklol (2015)
- Manuel Bleda – Istiklol (2014–2015)

=== Ukraine ===
- Dmytro Bondar – CSKA Pamir Dushanbe (2020)
- Artem Gaydash – CSKA Pamir Dushanbe (2020)
- Ivan Ponomarenko – CSKA Pamir (2020)
- Mykyta Shevtsov – CSKA Pamir (2021)
- Anatoly Starushchenko – CSKA Pamir Dushanbe (2011–2013, 2015–2019), Khayr Vahdat (2013–2015)
- Artem Baranovskyi – Istiklol (2017–2018)
- Oleksandr Garbar – Istiklol (2018)
- Hlib Hrachov – Istiklol (2022)
- Oleksandr Kablash – Istiklol (2016)
- Petro Kovalchuk – Istiklol (2017)
- **Oleksiy Larin** – **Istiklol** (2019–2021, 2024–)
- Andriy Mischenko — Istiklol (2021)
- Temur Partsvania – Istiklol (2022)
- Oleksandr Stetsenko – Istiklol (2017)
- **Yevhen Hrytsenko** – **Ravshan Kulob** (2023-)
- Igor Leonov – Regar-TadAZ (2012)
- Viktor Lykhovidko – Regar-TadAZ (2012–2013)
- Viktor Stanenko – CSKA Pamir Dushanbe (2012)
- Denis Sichuk – Khujand (2011), CSKA Pamir Dushanbe (2012)

== Notes ==
1. Born in Tajikistan
2. Born in Ghana
3. Born in Moldova
