= 2023 FC Istiklol season =

FC Istiklol
2023 season
- President: Shohruh Saidov
- Manager: Igor Cherevchenko
- Stadium: Republican Stadium
- Tajikistan Higher League: 1st (champions)
- Tajikistan Cup: Winners
- Super Cup: Runners-up
- AFC Champions League: Group stage
- Top goalscorer: League: Alisher Dzhalilov (13); All: Alisher Dzhalilov (15)
- Highest home attendance: 17,500 vs Al-Duhail (19 September 2023)
- Lowest home attendance: 250 vs Eskhata Khujand (25 June 2023)
- Average home league attendance: 1,317 (8 August 2023)
Home colours	Away colours

The FC Istiklol 2023 season was Istiklol's fifteenth Tajik League season, of which they are defending Tajik League Champions, whilst they also participated in the Tajik Cup, Tajik Supercup and AFC Champions League.

== Season events ==
On 18 January, Istiklol announced the appointment of Igor Cherevchenko their new head coach, on a one-year contract.

On 9 February, Istiklol announced the return of Alisher Dzhalilov and Ehson Panjshanbe, both on two-year contracts.

On 18 February, Istiklol announced the loan signing of Alidzhoni Ayni from Krasnodar-2 until the end of the season, and the signing of Amadoni Kamolov from Paracuellos Antamira to a two-year contract.

The following day, Salokhiddin Irgashev signed for Istiklol on a two-year contract from Metallurg Bekabad, with Sodikjon Kurbonov signing from Dynamo Dushanbe to a two-year contract on 20 February.

On 11 July, Istiklol announced that Idriss Aminu had left the club after his contract was terminated.

On 13 July, Istiklol announced the signing of Dženis Beganović who'd previously played for Željezničar Sarajevo, Artur Kartashyan from Van and the return of Akhtam Nazarov from Andijon.

On 14 July, Istiklol announced that they had mutually agreed to terminate the contracts of Siyovush Asrorov, Daler Imomnazarov and Sayedi Kovussho.

The following day, 15 July, Istiklol announced the singings of Croatian defender Ivan Novoselec and Ivorian forward Senin Sebai to one-year contracts.

On 18 July, Istiklol announced the singing of Iranian defender Mojtaba Moghtadaei to a one-year contract.

On 21 December, Istiklol announced that their contracts with Cédric Gogoua, Mojtaba Moghtadaei, Joseph Okoro and Senin Sebai had expired.

== Squad ==
As of match played 15 December 2023

No.	Name	Nationality	Position	Date of birth (age)	Signed from	Signed in	Contract ends	Apps.	Goals
Goalkeepers
1	Rustam Yatimov	(Tajikistan)	GK	13 July 1998 (aged 25)	Unattached	2018		119	0
16	Olimjon Juraev	(Tajikistan)	GK	17 September 2003 (aged 20)	Youth team	2022		0	0
50	Mukhriddin Khasanov	(Tajikistan)	GK	23 September 2002 (aged 21)	Khujand	2021		27	0
Defenders
3	Tabrezi Davlatmir	(Tajikistan)	DF	6 June 1998 (aged 25)	Narva Trans	2022		126	3
4	Artur Kartashyan	(Armenia)	DF	8 January 1997 (aged 26)	Van	2023		11	0
5	Sodikjon Kurbonov	(Tajikistan)	DF	19 January 2003 (aged 20)	Dynamo Dushanbe	2023	2024	25	3
19	Khaydar Sattorov	(Tajikistan)	DF	18 February 2003 (aged 20)	Youth Team	2023		5	0
22	Mojtaba Moghtadaei	(Iran)	DF	20 March 1996 (aged 27)	Naft Masjed Soleyman	2023	2024	9	0
23	Alidzhon Karomatullozoda	(Tajikistan)	DF	5 May 2002 (aged 21)	CSKA Pamir Dushanbe	2022		41	2
27	Cédric Gogoua	(Ivory Coast)	DF	10 July 1994 (aged 29)	Unattached	2023		20	1
28	Akhtam Nazarov	(Tajikistan)	DF	29 September 1992 (aged 31)	Andijon	2023		264	23
33	Ivan Novoselec	(Croatia)	DF	19 June 1995 (aged 28)	Koper	2023	2024	19	1
Midfielders
8	Dženis Beganović	(Bosnia and Herzegovina)	MF	23 March 1996 (aged 27)	Unattached	2023		19	2
9	Joseph Okoro	(Nigeria)	MF	17 February 2001 (aged 22)	Unattached	2023		24	0
10	Alisher Dzhalilov	(Tajikistan)	MF	29 August 1993 (aged 30)	AGMK	2023	2024	121	60
13	Amadoni Kamolov	(Tajikistan)	MF	16 January 2003 (aged 20)	Paracuellos Antamira	2023	2024	40	4
17	Ehson Panjshanbe	(Tajikistan)	MF	12 May 1999 (aged 24)	Zob Ahan Esfahan	2023	2024	132	28
20	Shukhratdzhon Shonazarov	(Tajikistan)	MF	26 October 2002 (aged 21)	Youth Team	2022		8	0
21	Romish Jalilov	(Tajikistan)	MF	21 November 1995 (aged 28)	Ravshan Kulob	2023			
55	Salokhiddin Irgashev	(Tajikistan)	MF	3 July 2003 (aged 20)	Metallurg Bekabad	2023	2024	2	1
70	Shahrom Sulaymonov	(Tajikistan)	MF	27 June 1997 (aged 26)	Utenis Utena	2018		121	6
77	Alidzhoni Ayni	(Tajikistan)	MF	6 August 2004 (aged 19)	on loan from Krasnodar-2	2023	2023	21	1
Forwards
11	Shervoni Mabatshoev	(Tajikistan)	FW	4 December 2000 (aged 23)	CSKA Pamir Dushanbe	2021	2023	84	27
12	Senin Sebai	(Ivory Coast)	FW	18 December 1993 (aged 29)	Hapoel Ironi Kiryat Shmona	2023	2024	19	9
18	Pakhlavon Bakhrizoda	(Tajikistan)	FW	19 March 2001 (aged 22)	Youth Team	2023		3	0
63	Manuchekhr Dzhalilov	(Tajikistan)	FW	27 September 1990 (aged 33)	Persebaya Surabaya	2020		187	163
Youth Team
	Saydali Ibragimov	(Tajikistan)	MF	10 April 2007 (aged 16)	Youth Team	2022		5	0
	Rustam Kamolov	(Tajikistan)	FW	4 June 2007 (aged 16)	Youth Team	2022		5	0
Also under contract
	Mukhammad Mukhammadzoda	(Tajikistan)	DF	14 April 2005 (aged 18)	Youth Team	2022		5	0
Away on loan
Left during the season
2	Siyovush Asrorov	(Tajikistan)	DF	21 July 1992 (aged 31)	Rahmatganj MFS	2022		155	11
14	Sayedi Kovussho	(Tajikistan)	DF	2 June 1995 (aged 28)	CSKA Pamir Dushanbe	2022		31	1
15	Idriss Aminu	(Ghana)	MF	15 July 1998 (aged 25)	CSKA Pamir Dushanbe	2022		23	0
18	Daler Imomnazarov	(Tajikistan)	DF	31 May 1995 (aged 28)	Dushanbe-83	2021	2023	57	1
	Parviz Baki-Akhunov	(Tajikistan)	MF	9 July 1998 (aged 25)	Khatlon	2022		7	0

== Transfers ==
=== In ===
Date	Position	Nationality	Name	From	Fee	Ref.
1 January 2023	MF	(Tajikistan)	Romish Jalilov	Ravshan Kulob	Undisclosed	
9 February 2023	MF	(Tajikistan)	Alisher Dzhalilov	AGMK	Undisclosed	
9 February 2023	MF	(Tajikistan)	Ehson Panjshanbe	Zob Ahan Esfahan	Undisclosed	
18 February 2023	FW	(Tajikistan)	Amadoni Kamolov	Paracuellos Antamira	Undisclosed	
19 February 2023	MF	(Tajikistan)	Salokhiddin Irgashev	Metallurg Bekabad	Undisclosed	
20 February 2023	DF	(Tajikistan)	Sodikjon Kurbonov	Dynamo Dushanbe	Undisclosed	
31 March 2023	DF	(Ivory Coast)	Cédric Gogoua	Unattached	Free	
31 March 2023	MF	(Nigeria)	Joseph Okoro	Unattached	Free	
13 July 2023	MF	(Bosnia and Herzegovina)	Dženis Beganović	Unattached	Free	
13 July 2023	DF	(Armenia)	Artur Kartashyan	Van	Undisclosed	
13 July 2023	DF	(Tajikistan)	Akhtam Nazarov	Andijon	Undisclosed	
15 July 2023	DF	(Croatia)	Ivan Novoselec	Koper	Undisclosed	
15 July 2023	FW	(Ivory Coast)	Senin Sebai	Hapoel Ironi Kiryat Shmona	Undisclosed	
18 July 2023	DF	(Iran)	Mojtaba Moghtadaei	Naft Masjed Soleyman	Undisclosed	

=== Loans in ===
Date	Position	Nationality	Name	From	Fee	Ref.
18 February 2023	MF	(Tajikistan)	Alidzhoni Ayni	Krasnodar-2	End of season	

=== Out ===
Date	Position	Nationality	Name	To	Fee	Ref.
24 January 2023	MF	(Tajikistan)	Mukhammadzhon Rakhimov	Nasaf	Undisclosed	
30 January 2023	DF	(Tajikistan)	Akhtam Nazarov	Andijon	Undisclosed	
24 February 2023	GK	(Tajikistan)	Shokhrukh Kirgizboev	Khujand	Undisclosed	
8 March 2023	DF	(Ukraine)	Hlib Hrachov	Liepāja	Undisclosed	

=== Released ===
Date	Position	Nationality	Name	Joined	Date	Ref
1 March 2023	MF	(Tajikistan)	Parviz Baki-Akhunov	Panjshir	3 April 2025	
11 July 2023	MF	(Ghana)	Idriss Aminu			
14 July 2023	DF	(Tajikistan)	Siyovush Asrorov	Eskhata	22 July 2023	
14 July 2023	DF	(Tajikistan)	Daler Imomnazarov	Eskhata	22 July 2023	
14 July 2023	DF	(Tajikistan)	Sayedi Kovussho	Eskhata	22 July 2023	
21 December 2023	DF	(Ivory Coast)	Cédric Gogoua	Shinnik Yaroslavl	16 February 2024	
21 December 2023	DF	(Iran)	Mojtaba Moghtadaei	Pars Jonoubi Jam	31 July 2024	
21 December 2023	MF	(Nigeria)	Joseph Okoro	Bnei Yehuda		
21 December 2023	FW	(Ivory Coast)	Senin Sebai	Al Jandal		
31 December 2023	DF	(Armenia)	Artur Kartashyan	Telavi		
31 December 2023	DF	(Tajikistan)	Mukhammad Mukhammadzoda	Ravshan Kulob		
31 December 2023	MF	(Tajikistan)	Saydali Ibragimov	CSKA Pamir Dushanbe		

=== Trial ===
Date From	Position	Nationality	Name	Last club	Date To	Ref.
February 2023	DF	(Romania)	Mihai Leca	Lviv		
February 2023	FW	(Russia)	Andrei Panyukov	Veles Moscow		
February 2023	MF	(Ghana)	Mohammed Kadiri	Dynamo Kyiv		
February 2023	DF	(Croatia)	Marko Perković	MTK Budapest		
February 2023	DF	(Ivory Coast)	Cédric Gogoua	Turan		
March 2023	MF	(Nigeria)	Joseph Okoro	Olimp-Dolgoprudny		

== Friendlies ==
8 February 2023	Istiklol	3–0	Regar-TadAZ	Dushanbe
14:00 (UTC+5)	M.Dzhalilov 30'; A.Dzhalilov 37'; Jalilov 90+1'	Report		Stadium: Pamir Stadium; Referee: Behruz Murtazoev

17 February 2023	Istiklol	3–1	Okzhetpes	Belek, Turkey
18:00 (UTC+5)	M.Dzhalilov; A.Dzhalilov	Report	Goal

23 February 2023	Istiklol	0–3	Fakel Voronezh	Belek, Turkey
13:30 (UTC+5)		Report	Leca 17' (o.g.); Magal 37'; Suslov 84'

27 February 2023	Turan	1–2	Istiklol	Belek, Turkey
19:00 (UTC+5)	Diallo 35'	Report	M.Dzhalilov (penalty missed) 30'; Kadiri 52'; Karomatullozoda 68'

20 March 2023	Istiklol	6–1	Regar-TadAZ	Dushanbe
12:00 (UTC+5)	Kamolov 10'; Mabatshoev 18', 23'; M.Dzhalilov 32'; Ayni 56'; Jalilov 81'; Sattorov (yellow card)	Report	Mahmadiev 90'; Azizov (yellow card); Ahmedov (yellow card)	Stadium: Pamir Stadium; Referee: Abdullah Davlatov

23 March 2023	Istiklol	0–0	Khosilot Farkhor	Dushanbe
16:00 (UTC+5)		Report		Stadium: Pamir Stadium

19 July 2023	Nasaf	2–0	Istiklol	Qarshi, Uzbekistan
20:00 (UTC+5)	Jighauri 52', 62'	Report		Stadium: Markaziy Stadium; Attendance: 6,200; Referee: Ravshan Abduvahidov

23 July 2023	Pakhtakor Tashkent	1–2	Istiklol	Tashkent, Uzbekistan
20:00 (UTC+5)	Kartashyan 31' (pen.); Sebai 78'	Report	Ćeran 32' (pen.)	Stadium: Pakhtakor Central Stadium

== TFF Cup ==
=== Preliminary round ===
10 March 2023 1	Istiklol	0–1	Khosilot Farkhor	Guliston
(UTC+5)		Report		Stadium: National Bank
Note: Istiklol's youth team represented the club in the TFF Cup Matches.

== Competitions ==
=== Overview ===
Competition	First match	Last match	Starting round	Final position	Record							
Competition	First match	Last match	Starting round	Final position	Pld	W	D	L	GF	GA	GD	Win %
Tajikistan Higher League	3 April 2023	15 December 2023	Matchday 1	Winners	22	16	4	2	56	12	+44	72.73
Tajikistan Cup	29 July 2023	1 November 2023	Last 16	Winners	5	3	2	0	10	3	+7	60.00
Tajik Super Cup	6 May 2023	6 May 2023	Final	Runners-up	1	0	0	1	0	1	−1	0.00
AFC Champions League	19 September 2023	5 December 2023	Group Stage	Group Stage	6	0	3	3	3	9	−6	0.00
Total					34	19	9	6	69	25	+44	55.88

Last updated: 15 December 2023
Source: Competitions

=== Tajik Supercup ===
6 May 2023	Istiklol	0–1	Ravshan Kulob	Hisar
18:00 (UTC+5)		Report	Safarov 7' (yellow card); Khurshed (yellow card); Maaboah (yellow card); Idan (yellow card); Akomadi (yellow card); Hrytsenko (yellow card)	Stadium: Central Stadium; Attendance: 9,200; Referee: Sayodzhon Zainiddinov

=== Tajikistan Higher League ===
==== Regular season ====
===== Results summary =====
Overall								Home						Away					
Pld	W	D	L	GF	GA	GD	Pts	W	D	L	GF	GA	GD	W	D	L	GF	GA	GD
17	12	3	2	42	8	+34	39	7	1	1	29	3	+26	5	2	1	13	5	+8

Last updated: 17 August 2023.
Source: See Results

===== Results by round =====
Round	1	2	3	4	5	6	7	8	9	10	11	12	13	14	15	16	17	18
Ground	H	H	A	H	H (Note: matchday 6)	H (Note: matchday 7)	H (Note: matchday 8)	A (Note: matchday 9)	H (Note: matchday 10)	A (Note: matchday 11)	H (Note: matchday 12)	H (Note: matchday 14)	A (Note: matchday 5)	A (Note: matchday 15)	A (Note: matchday 16)	A (Note: matchday 17)	A (Note: matchday 18)	A (Note: matchday 5)
Result	W	W	D	W	D	L	W	W	W	W	L	W	W	D	W	W	W	D
Position	1	1	1	1	1	1	1	1	1	1	1	1	1	1	1	1	1	1

Source: Results
A = Away; H = Home; W = Win; D = Draw; L = Loss

===== Results =====
3 April 2023 1	Istiklol	4–0	Khujand	Dushanbe
16:00 (UTC+5)	Jalilov 16'; A.Dzhalilov 32', 42' (yellow card); M.Dzhalilov 74'; Asrorov (yellow card)	Report	Abdusalimov (yellow card)	Stadium: Pamir Stadium; Attendance: 1,500; Referee: Abdullah Davlatov

7 April 2023 2	Istiklol	2–1	Fayzkand	Dushanbe
16:00 (UTC+5)	M.Dzhalilov 9', 37'; Gogoua (yellow card) (yellow-red card) 49'; Panjshanbe (yellow card); Mabatshoev (yellow card)	Report	Sulaymonov 4' (yellow card)	Stadium: Pamir Stadium; Attendance: 1,500; Referee: Rustam Nurmatov

12 April 2023 3	Regar-TadAZ	1–1	Istiklol	Tursunzoda
16:00 (UTC+5)	Davlatov 6' (yellow card); Elmurodov (yellow card); Godson (yellow card)	Report	M.Dzhalilov 11' (yellow card); Sattorov (yellow card); Karomatullozoda (yellow card); Imomnazarov (yellow card)	Stadium: TALCO Arena; Attendance: 1,700; Referee: Amirjon Horkashev

16 April 2023 4	Istiklol	2–0	Kuktosh Rudaki	Dushanbe
16:30 (UTC+5)	A.Dzhalilov 23'; M.Dzhalilov 89' (yellow card)	Report	Giyosov (yellow card); Kholmatov (yellow card); Murodov (yellow card)	Stadium: Pamir Stadium; Attendance: 500; Referee: Abdullah Davlatov

26 April 2023 6	Istiklol	0–0	CSKA Pamir	Dushanbe
18:30 (UTC+5)	Gogoua (yellow card)	Report	Ruziev (yellow card); Choriyev (yellow card); Yusupov (yellow card); Jurabekzoda (yellow card)	Stadium: Pamir Stadium; Attendance: 400; Referee: Sayodjon Zainiddinov

30 April 2023 7	Ravshan Kulob	1–0	Istiklol	Kulob
17:00 (UTC+5)	Nazarov 62'; Safarov (yellow card); Farrukhzod (yellow card)	Report	Davlatmir (yellow card)	Stadium: Central Stadium; Attendance: 9,000; Referee: Khurshed Dadoboev

10 May 2023 8	Istiklol	5–0	Khatlon	Dushanbe
17:00 (UTC+5)	Panjshanbe 1', 14', 68'; Kurbonov 35'; M.Dzhalilov 70'	Report	Bozorov (yellow card); Kuchkarov (yellow card); Habibulloev (yellow card)	Stadium: Pamir Stadium; Attendance: 250; Referee: Nasrullo Kabirov

14 May 2023 9	Khosilot Farkhor	0–1	Istiklol	Farkhor
17:00 (UTC+5)	Karimov (yellow card); Cholov (yellow card)	Report	Mabatshoev 20' (pen.); Gogoua (yellow card); Panjshanbe (yellow card); Karomatullozoda (yellow card)	Stadium: Central Stadium; Attendance: 5,000; Referee: Amirjon Khorkashev

19 May 2023 10	Istiklol	5–0	Khosilot Farkhor	Dushanbe
17:00 (UTC+5)	M.Dzhalilov 20', 90+1'; Panjshanbe 45+1'; Mabatshoev 70'; A.Dzhalilov 77'; Gogoua (yellow card); Aminu (yellow card)	Report		Stadium: Pamir Stadium; Attendance: 1,000; Referee: Abdullo Davlatov

24 May 2023 11	Khatlon	1–3	Istiklol	Bokhtar
17:30 (UTC+5)	Kuchkarov 40' (yellow card); Dodzi (yellow card); Barotov (yellow card)	Report	Derrick 16' (o.g.); A.Dzhalilov 48'; M.Dzhalilov 51'; Kamolov (yellow card)	Stadium: Tsentralnyi Stadium; Attendance: 7,500; Referee: Khurshed Dadabaev

28 May 2023 12	Istiklol	1–2	Ravshan Kulob	Dushanbe
17:30 (UTC+5)	Mabatshoev 64' (yellow card); Asrorov (yellow card); A.Dzhalilov (yellow card); Gogoua (yellow card)	Report	Safarov 59'; Olimzoda 61'; Sharifi (yellow card); Naskov (yellow card)	Stadium: Pamir Stadium; Attendance: 6,200; Referee: Gulmurodi Sadullo

25 June 2023 14	Istiklol	5–0	Eskhata Khujand	Dushanbe
20:00 (UTC+5)	A.Dzhalilov 45'; Kamolov 54'; Panjshanbe 57' (yellow card); Sulaymonov 80'; Bakhrizoda 90+2'; Jalilov (yellow card); Okoro (yellow card)	Report	Abdugafforov (yellow card); Khakimov (yellow card); Kholmatov (yellow card)	Stadium: Pamir Stadium; Attendance: 200; Referee: Bakhtiyor Komilov

30 June 2023 5	Eskhata Khujand	0–3	Istiklol	Khujand
16:30 (UTC+5)	Hibaba (yellow card)	Report	Hibaba 28' (o.g.); A.Dzhalilov 75'; Panjshanbe 90+2'	Stadium: 20 Years of Independence Stadium; Attendance: 5,500; Referee: Amirjon Khorkashev
Note: Match originally scheduled for 21 April 2023, but postponed as this fell on Eid al-Fitr.

4 August 2023 15	Kuktosh Rudaki	1–1	Istiklol	Chorgulteppa
17:00 (UTC+5)	Kamal 28'; Kholboev (yellow card); Karimov (yellow card); Turdinazarov (yellow card)	Report	Panjshanbe (penalty missed) 44'; Sebai 48' (yellow card); Beganović (yellow card)	Stadium: Neftyanik Stadium; Attendance: 3,900; Referee: Nasrullo Kabirov

8 August 2023 16	Istiklol	5–0	Regar-TadAZ	Hisar
20:00 (UTC+5)	Sebai 28'; Panjshanbe 74'; Ayni 79'; Kamolov 84'; A.Dzhalilov 90+1'; Okoro (yellow card); Gogoua (yellow card); Kurbonov (yellow card)	Report	Muradov (yellow card)	Stadium: Central Stadium; Attendance: 300; Referee: Khurshed Dadobaev

13 August 2023 17	Fayzkand	1–2	Istiklol	Chorgulteppa
17:00 (UTC+5)	Haignegue 58' (yellow card); Pirov (yellow card); Arsen (yellow card)	Report	Kamolov 42'; Kurbonov 45'; Jalilov (yellow card)	Stadium: Neftyanik Stadium; Attendance: 850; Referee: Sayodzhon Zainiddinov

17 August 2023 18	Khujand	0–2	Istiklol	Khujand
17:00 (UTC+5)	Ziyoev (yellow card) (yellow-red card) 26'	Report	A.Dzhalilov 29'; Okoro (yellow card) (yellow-red card) 60'; Panjshanbe 90+4'; Kamolov (yellow card); Novoselec (yellow card); Kurbonov (yellow card); Gogoua (yellow card)	Stadium: 20 Years of Independence Stadium; Attendance: 4,200; Referee: Gulmurad Sadulla

10 September 2023 13	CSKA Pamir	0–0	Istiklol	Dushanbe
21:30 (UTC+5)	Doirian (yellow card)	Report	Sebai (yellow card); A.Dzhalilov (yellow card); Panjshanbe (yellow card)	Stadium: Pamir Stadium; Referee: Sayodjon Zainiddinov
Note: Match originally scheduled for 3 June 2023, but postponed to allow for Tajikistan's preparation for the 2023 CAFA Nations Cup.

===== League table =====
Pos	Team	Pld	W	D	L	GF	GA	GD	Pts	Qualification or relegation
1	Istiklol (Q)	18	12	4	2	42	8	+34	40	Qualification for Championship round
2	Ravshan Kulob (Q)	18	8	7	3	23	13	+10	31	Qualification for Championship round
3	Kuktosh Rudaki (Q)	18	9	2	7	30	25	+5	29	Qualification for Championship round
4	Eskhata (Q)	18	8	2	8	24	28	−4	26	Qualification for Championship round
5	Fayzkand (Q)	18	6	7	5	24	22	+2	25	Qualification for Championship round

Updated to match(es) played on 10 September 2023. Source: Soccerway
Rules for classification: 1) Points; 2) Head-to-head points; 3) Head-to-head goal difference; 4) Head-to-head goals scored; 5) Goal difference; 6) Goals scored.
(Q) Qualified for the phase indicated

==== Championship round ====
===== Results summary =====
Overall								Home						Away					
Pld	W	D	L	GF	GA	GD	Pts	W	D	L	GF	GA	GD	W	D	L	GF	GA	GD
4	4	0	0	14	4	+10	12	2	0	0	6	2	+4	2	0	0	8	2	+6

Last updated: 15 December 2023.
Source: See Results

===== Results by round =====
Round	1	2	3	4
Ground	A	H	H	A
Result	W	W	W	W
Position	1	1	1	1

Source: Results
A = Away; H = Home; W = Win; D = Draw; L = Loss

===== Results =====
1 December 2023 3	Kuktosh Rudaki	1–4	Istiklol	Dushanbe
16:00 (UTC+5)	Odilov (yellow card) 90+1'	Report	A.Dzhalilov 40', 70'; Mabatshoev 76'; Kamolov 84'; Ayni (yellow card); Okoro (yellow card)	Stadium: Pamir Stadium; Attendance: 500; Referee: Bakhtiyor Komilov

9 December 2023 2	Istiklol	2–0	Ravshan Kulob	Dushanbe
14:00 (UTC+5)	Sebai 17'; Mabatshoev 28' (yellow card); Karomatullozoda (yellow card); Jalilov (yellow card)	Report	Ofori (yellow card); Maaboah (yellow card)	Stadium: Pamir Stadium; Attendance: 1,200; Referee: Khurshed Dadoboev

12 December 2023 4	Istiklol	4–2	Eskhata Khujand	Dushanbe
12:30 (UTC+5)	A.Dzhalilov 35' (pen.); Abdugafforov 63' (o.g.); Irgashev 86'; Sebai 90+2'; Jalilov (yellow card); Beganović (yellow card)	Report	Abdugafforov 40'; Zaripov 50'	Stadium: Pamir Stadium; Referee: Subhan Shodiev

15 December 2023 5	Fayzkand	1–4	Istiklol	Dushanbe
12:30 (UTC+5)	Muradov 76'; Kamchinov (yellow card); Feumba (yellow card)	Report	Sebai 8', 11'; A.Dzhalilov 19'; Novoselec 40' (pen.); Karomatullozoda (yellow card); Mabatshoev (yellow card); Beganović (yellow card); Kamolov (yellow card)	Stadium: Pamir Stadium

===== League table =====
Pos	Team	Pld	W	D	L	GF	GA	GD	Pts	Qualification or relegation
1	Istiklol (C)	22	16	4	2	56	12	+44	52	Qualification for AFC Champions League Two group stage
2	Ravshan Kulob	22	9	8	5	29	20	+9	35	Qualification for AFC Champions League Two group stage
3	Kuktosh Rudaki	22	10	3	9	38	36	+2	33	
4	Eskhata	22	10	3	9	30	32	−2	33	
5	Fayzkand	22	6	8	8	29	36	−7	26	

Updated to match(es) played on 18 December 2023. Source: Soccerway
Rules for classification: 1) Points; 2) Head-to-head points; 3) Head-to-head goal difference; 4) Head-to-head goals scored; 5) Goal difference; 6) Goals scored.
(C) Champions

=== Tajikistan Cup ===
29 July 2023 Last 16	Istiklol	5–1	CSKA Pamir Dushanbe	Chorgulteppa
17:00 (UTC+5)	Gogoua 11'; Beganović 38'; A.Dzhalilov 45+2'; Mabatshoev 55'; Davlatmir 73'; Kartashyan (yellow card)	Report	Dzhuraev 51' (pen.)	Stadium: Neftyanik Stadium; Attendance: 1,300; Referee: Khurshed Dadabaev

26 August 2023 Quarterfinal	Istiklol	2–0	Fayzkand	Hisar
20:30 (UTC+5)	Sebai 51'; Beganović 63'	Report	Feumba (yellow card); Akbaraliev (yellow card)	Stadium: Central Stadium; Referee: Khurshed Dadabaev

27 September 2023 Semifinal 1st leg	Istiklol	1–0	Regar-TadAZ	Dushanbe
18:00 (UTC+5)	Sulaymonov 19'; Kurbonov (yellow card); Davlatmir (yellow card)	Report		Stadium: Pamir Stadium; Attendance: 500; Referee: Rustam Nurmatov

19 October 2023 Semifinal 2nd leg	Regar-TadAZ	1–1 (1–2 agg.)	Istiklol	Tursunzoda
(UTC+5)	Akhmadov 90+4'; Elmurodov (yellow card)	Report	Panjshanbe 70'; Kurbonov (yellow card); Sulaymonov (yellow card); Mabatshoev (yellow card)	Stadium: TALCO Arena; Attendance: 500; Referee: Yusuf Ishmatov

==== Final ====
1 November 2023	Istiklol	1–1 (a.e.t.) (4–2 p)	Ravshan	Kulob
14:00 (UTC+5)	Davlatmir (red card) 52'; Kurbonov 105+2'; Kamolov (yellow card)	Report	Akomadi 100'; Maaboah (yellow card); Naskov (yellow card); Saidkhodzha (yellow card); Khudoydodzoda (yellow card)	Stadium: Central Stadium; Attendance: 12,200; Referee: Nasrullo Kabirov
	Penalties
	Kartashyan (penalty scored); Nazarov (penalty scored); Sulaymonov (penalty scored); Beganović (penalty scored)		(penalty scored) Nazarov; (penalty scored) Okran; (penalty missed) Akomadi; (penalty missed) Hrytsenko

=== AFC Champions League ===
==== Group stage ====
Pos	Team	Pld	W	D	L	GF	GA	GD	Pts	Qualification
1	(Saudi Arabia) Al Nassr	6	4	2	0	13	7	+6	14	Advance to round of 16
2	(Iran) Persepolis	6	2	2	2	5	5	0	8	
3	(Qatar) Al-Duhail	6	2	1	3	9	9	0	7	
4	(Tajikistan) Istiklol	6	0	3	3	3	9	−6	3	

Source: AFC
Rules for classification: Tiebreakers

19 September 2023 1	Istiklol (Tajikistan)	0–0	(Qatar) Al-Duhail	Dushanbe, Tajikistan
21:00 (UTC+5)	Gogoua (yellow card) 90+5'	Report	Bamba (yellow card) 53'; Semedo (yellow card) 90+2'; Mohamad Hassan (yellow card) 90+3'	Stadium: Pamir Stadium; Attendance: 17,500; Referee: Ahmad Al Ali (Kuwait)

2 October 2023 2	Al Nassr (Saudi Arabia)	3–1	(Tajikistan) Istiklol	Riyadh, Saudi Arabia
23:00 (UTC+5)	Ronaldo 66'; Talisca 72', 77'	Report	Sebai 44'	Stadium: Al-Awwal Park; Referee: Ko Hyung-jin (South Korea)

24 October 2023 3	Persepolis (Iran)	2–0	(Tajikistan) Istiklol	Tehran, Iran
21:00 (UTC+5)	Sadeghi 44', 71'; Rafiei (yellow card) 45'; Gvelesiani (yellow card) 63'	Report	Sebai (penalty missed) 7'; Novoselec (yellow card) 57'	Stadium: Azadi Stadium; Attendance: 36,450; Referee: Mohanad Qasim Sarray (Iraq)

7 November 2023 4	Istiklol (Tajikistan)	1–1	(Iran) Persepolis	Dushanbe, Tajikistan
19:00 (UTC+5)	A.Dzhalilov (yellow card) 18'; Kurbonov (yellow card) 43'; Davlatmir (yellow card) 65'; Sebai 74'	Report	Gvelesiani (yellow card) 8'; Torabi 29'	Stadium: Pamir Stadium; Attendance: 12,500; Referee: Ahmad Al-Ali (Kuwait)

27 November 2023 5	Al-Duhail (Qatar)	2–0	(Tajikistan) Istiklol	Doha, Qatar
21:00 (UTC+5)	Madibo (yellow card) 9'; Olunga 47', 89'; Semedo (red card) 90+4'; Amer (yellow card) 90+5'	Report	Sebai (yellow card) 22'	Stadium: Abdullah bin Khalifa Stadium; Attendance: 2,032; Referee: Nazmi Nasaruddin (Malaysia)

5 December 2023 6	Istiklol (Tajikistan)	1–1	(Saudi Arabia) Al Nassr	Dushanbe, Tajikistan
21:00 (UTC+5)	A.Dzhalilov 32' (yellow card) 33'; Karomatullozoda (yellow card) 64'; Sebai (yellow card) 79'	Report	Qassem (yellow card) 45+5'; Al-Najei (yellow card) 47'; Ghareeb 50'; Otávio (yellow card) 90+4'	Stadium: Pamir Stadium; Referee: Mohammed Abdulla Hassan Mohamed (United Arab Emirates)

== Squad statistics ==
As of match played 15 December 2023

=== Appearances and goals ===
No.	Pos	Nat	Player	Total		Tajikistan Higher League		Tajikistan Cup		Super Cup		AFC Champions League	
No.	Pos	Nat	Player	Apps	Goals	Apps	Goals	Apps	Goals	Apps	Goals	Apps	Goals
1	GK	(Tajikistan) TJK	Rustam Yatimov	30	0	18	0	5	0	1	0	6	0
3	DF	(Tajikistan) TJK	Tabrezi Davlatmir	24	1	10+3	0	2+2	1	1	0	4+2	0
4	DF	(Armenia) ARM	Artur Kartashyan	11	0	3	0	3+1	0	0	0	4	0
5	DF	(Tajikistan) TJK	Sodikjon Kurbonov	25	3	13	2	4+1	1	1	0	4+2	0
8	MF	(Bosnia and Herzegovina) BIH	Dženis Beganović	19	2	7+1	0	5	2	0	0	6	0
9	MF	(Nigeria) NGR	Joseph Okoro	24	0	17+3	0	1	0	1	0	0+2	0
10	MF	(Tajikistan) TJK	Alisher Dzhalilov	33	15	21	13	5	1	1	0	6	1
11	FW	(Tajikistan) TJK	Shervoni Mabatshoev	34	6	20+2	5	5	1	0+1	0	0+6	0
12	FW	(Ivory Coast) CIV	Senin Sebai	19	9	5+3	6	3+2	1	0	0	6	2
13	MF	(Tajikistan) TJK	Amadoni Kamolov	32	4	13+7	4	3+2	0	1	0	6	0
17	MF	(Tajikistan) TJK	Ehson Panjshanbe	32	9	19+1	8	3+2	1	1	0	6	0
18	FW	(Tajikistan) TJK	Pakhlavon Bakhrizoda	3	1	1+2	1	0	0	0	0	0	0
19	DF	(Tajikistan) TJK	Khaydar Sattorov	5	0	1+4	0	0	0	0	0	0	0
20	MF	(Tajikistan) TJK	Shukhratdzhon Shonazarov	3	0	0+3	0	0	0	0	0	0	0
21	MF	(Tajikistan) TJK	Romish Jalilov	28	1	15+4	1	1+2	0	0+1	0	5	0
22	DF	(Iran) IRI	Mojtaba Moghtadaei	9	0	2+3	0	3+1	0	0	0	0	0
23	DF	(Tajikistan) TJK	Alidzhon Karomatullozoda	16	0	11+2	0	0+1	0	0	0	1+1	0
27	DF	(Ivory Coast) CIV	Cédric Gogoua	20	1	13+1	0	1	1	1	0	4	0
28	DF	(Tajikistan) TJK	Akhtam Nazarov	15	0	8+1	0	3+1	0	0	0	2	0
33	DF	(Croatia) CRO	Ivan Novoselec	19	1	8	1	5	0	0	0	6	0
55	MF	(Tajikistan) TJK	Salokhiddin Irgashev	2	1	1+1	1	0	0	0	0	0	0
63	FW	(Tajikistan) TJK	Manuchekhr Dzhalilov	12	9	11	9	0	0	1	0	0	0
70	MF	(Tajikistan) TJK	Shahrom Sulaymonov	27	2	6+13	1	2+3	1	0	0	0+3	0
77	MF	(Tajikistan) TJK	Alidzhoni Ayni	21	1	4+13	1	1+2	0	0+1	0	0	0
99	GK	(Tajikistan) TJK	Mukhriddin Khasanov	4	0	4	0	0	0	0	0	0	0
Youth team players:
Players away from Istiklol on loan:
Players who left Istiklol during the season:
2	DF	(Tajikistan) TJK	Siyovush Asrorov	7	0	5+2	0	0	0	0	0	0	0
14	DF	(Tajikistan) TJK	Sayedi Kovussho	6	0	4+1	0	0	0	1	0	0	0
15	MF	(Ghana) GHA	Idriss Aminu	8	0	6+2	0	0	0	0	0	0	0
18	DF	(Tajikistan) TJK	Daler Imomnazarov	11	0	1+9	0	0	0	1	0	0	0

=== Goal scorers ===
Place	Position	Nation	Number	Name	Tajikistan Higher League	Tajikistan Cup	Super Cup	AFC Champions League	Total
1	MF	(Tajikistan)	10	Alisher Dzhalilov	13	1	0	1	15
2	FW	(Tajikistan)	63	Manuchekhr Dzhalilov	9	0	0	0	9
2	MF	(Tajikistan)	17	Ehson Panjshanbe	8	1	0	0	9
2	FW	(Ivory Coast)	12	Senin Sebai	6	1	0	2	9
5	FW	(Tajikistan)	11	Shervoni Mabatshoev	5	1	0	0	6
6	MF	(Tajikistan)	13	Amadoni Kamolov	4	0	0	0	4
7	DF	(Tajikistan)	5	Sodikjon Kurbonov	2	1	0	0	3
7				Own goal	3	0	0	0	3
9	MF	(Tajikistan)	70	Shahrom Sulaymonov	1	1	0	0	2
9	MF	(Bosnia and Herzegovina)	8	Dženis Beganović	0	2	0	0	2
11	MF	(Tajikistan)	21	Romish Jalilov	1	0	0	0	1
11	FW	(Tajikistan)	18	Pakhlavon Bakhrizoda	1	0	0	0	1
11	MF	(Tajikistan)	77	Alidzhoni Ayni	1	0	0	0	1
11	MF	(Tajikistan)	55	Salokhiddin Irgashev	1	0	0	0	1
11	DF	(Croatia)	33	Ivan Novoselec	1	0	0	0	1
11	DF	(Ivory Coast)	27	Cédric Gogoua	0	1	0	0	1
11	DF	(Tajikistan)	3	Tabrezi Davlatmir	0	1	0	0	1
TOTALS					56	10	0	3	69

=== Clean sheets ===
Place	Position	Nation	Number	Name	Tajikistan Higher League	Tajikistan Cup	Super Cup	AFC Champions League	Total
1	GK	(Tajikistan)	1	Rustam Yatimov	10	2	0	0	12
2	GK	(Tajikistan)	99	Mukhriddin Khasanov	2	0	0	0	2
TOTALS					12	2	0	0	14

=== Disciplinary record ===
Number	Nation	Position	Name	Tajikistan Higher League		Tajikistan Cup		Super Cup		AFC Champions League		Total	
Number	Nation	Position	Name	Booked	Sent off (straight red)	Booked	Sent off (straight red)	Booked	Sent off (straight red)	Booked	Sent off (straight red)	Booked	Sent off (straight red)
3	(Tajikistan)	DF	Tabrezi Davlatmir	1	0	1	1	0	0	1	0	3	1
4	(Armenia)	DF	Artur Kartashyan	0	0	1	0	0	0	0	0	1	0
5	(Tajikistan)	DF	Sodikjon Kurbonov	2	0	2	0	0	0	1	0	5	0
8	(Bosnia and Herzegovina)	MF	Dženis Beganović	3	0	0	0	0	0	0	0	3	0
9	(Nigeria)	MF	Joseph Okoro	5	1	0	0	0	0	0	0	5	1
10	(Tajikistan)	MF	Alisher Dzhalilov	3	0	0	0	0	0	2	0	5	0
11	(Tajikistan)	FW	Shervoni Mabatshoev	4	0	1	0	0	0	0	0	5	0
12	(Ivory Coast)	FW	Senin Sebai	2	0	0	0	0	0	2	0	4	0
13	(Tajikistan)	MF	Amadoni Kamolov	3	0	1	0	0	0	0	0	4	0
17	(Tajikistan)	MF	Ehson Panjshanbe	4	0	0	0	0	0	0	0	4	0
19	(Tajikistan)	DF	Khaydar Sattorov	1	0	0	0	0	0	0	0	1	0
21	(Tajikistan)	MF	Romish Jalilov	4	0	0	0	0	0	0	0	4	0
23	(Tajikistan)	DF	Alidzhon Karomatullozoda	4	0	0	0	0	0	1	0	5	0
27	(Ivory Coast)	DF	Cédric Gogoua	8	1	0	0	0	0	0	0	8	1
33	(Croatia)	DF	Ivan Novoselec	1	0	0	0	0	0	1	0	2	0
63	(Tajikistan)	FW	Manuchekhr Dzhalilov	2	0	0	0	0	0	0	0	2	0
70	(Tajikistan)	MF	Shahrom Sulaymonov	0	0	1	0	0	0	0	0	1	0
77	(Tajikistan)	MF	Alidzhoni Ayni	1	0	0	0	0	0	0	0	1	0
Players who left Istiklol during the season:
2	(Tajikistan)	DF	Siyovush Asrorov	2	0	0	0	0	0	0	0	2	0
15	(Ghana)	MF	Iddris Aminu	1	0	0	0	0	0	0	0	1	0
18	(Tajikistan)	DF	Daler Imomnazarov	1	0	0	0	0	0	0	0	1	0
			TOTALS	52	2	7	1	0	0	8	0	67	3
