= 2023 Tajik Super Cup =

- Event: Tajik Supercup
Istiklol	Ravshan Kulob
0	1
- Date: 6 May 2023
- Venue: Central Stadium, Hisar
- Man of the Match: Yevhen Hrytsenko
- Referee: Sayodzhon Zainiddinov (Dushanbe)
- Attendance: 9,200

The 2023 Tajik Supercup is the 14th Tajik Supercup, an annual Tajik football match played between the winners of the previous season's Tajikistan Higher League and Tajikistan Cup. The match was contested by 2022 League champions Istiklol, and the 2022 Cup champions Ravshan Kulob.

== Background ==
On 11 April 2023, the Tajikistan Football Federation announced that the 2023 edition of the Tajik Supercup would now be played at 18:00hrs on 6 May at the Central Stadium in Hisar, instead of the originally assigned 20 Years of Independence Stadium in Khujand due to the latter now being unavailable.

On 4 May, Sayodzhon Zainiddinov was announced as the referee for the match.

== Match ==
=== Summary ===
A goal in the 7th minute of the match from Amirjon Safarov was enough to give Ravshan Kulob their second Tajik Supercup title.

=== Details ===
6 May 2023
18:00 (UTC+5)

Istiklol	0–1	Ravshan Kulob
	Report	Safarov 7'

Central Stadium, Hisar
Attendance: 9,200
Referee: Sayodzhon Zainiddinov (Dushanbe)

Istiklol	Ravshan Kulob

GK	1	(Tajikistan)	Rustam Yatimov
DF	3	(Tajikistan)	Tabrezi Davlatmir	(substituted off) 80'
DF	5	(Tajikistan)	Sodikjon Kurbonov	(substituted off) 46'
DF	9	(Nigeria)	Joseph Okoro
DF	14	(Tajikistan)	Sayedi Kovussho
DF	18	(Tajikistan)	Daler Imomnazarov	(substituted off) 46'
DF	27	(Ivory Coast)	Cédric Gogoua
MF	10	(Tajikistan)	Alisher Dzhalilov
MF	13	(Tajikistan)	Amadoni Kamolov
MF	17	(Tajikistan)	Ehson Panjshanbe
FW	63	(Tajikistan)	Manuchekhr Dzhalilov
Substitutes:
GK	99	(Tajikistan)	Mukhriddin Khasanov
DF	2	(Tajikistan)	Siyovush Asrorov
FW	11	(Tajikistan)	Shervoni Mabatshoev	(substituted in) 46'
MF	15	(Ghana)	Idriss Aminu
DF	19	(Tajikistan)	Khaydar Sattorov
MF	21	(Tajikistan)	Romish Jalilov	(substituted in) 46'
MF	22	(Tajikistan)	Parviz Baki-Akhunov
DF	23	(Tajikistan)	Alidzhon Karomatullozoda
MF	55	(Tajikistan)	Salokhiddin Irgashev
MF	70	(Tajikistan)	Shahrom Sulaymonov
MF	77	(Tajikistan)	Alidzhoni Ayni	(substituted in) 80'
Manager:
(Tajikistan) Igor Cherevchenko

GK	31	(Ukraine)	Yevhen Hrytsenko	Booked
DF	14	(Tajikistan)	Bakhtovari Khurshed	Booked
DF	15	(Ghana)	Samuel Ofori
DF	22	(Tajikistan)	Kholmurod Nazarov
DF	27	(Tajikistan)	Shakhriyori Inoyatullo		(substituted off) 82'
MF	6	(Ghana)	Emmanuel Maaboah	Booked	(substituted off) 90+6'
MF	8	(Tajikistan)	Abbos Andalibov
MF	19	(Ghana)	Ocran Idan	Booked
MF	63	(Tajikistan)	Saidkhodzha Mukhammad Sharifi
FW	11	(Tajikistan)	Amirjon Safarov	Booked	(substituted off) 71'
FW	21	(Ghana)	Joseph Akomadi	Booked
Substitutes:
FW	17	(Ivory Coast)	Chris Emmanuel Kakou		(substituted in) 71'
FW	41	(Tajikistan)	Tokhir Maladustov		(substituted in) 90+6'
MF		(Tajikistan)	Amirjoni Farrukhzod		(substituted in) 82'
Manager:
(Tajikistan) Tokhirjon Muminov

Man of the Match: Yevhen Hrytsenko
Assistant referees:
Akmal Buriev (Tursunzade)
Khusravi Siddikzod (Dushanbe)
Fourth official:
Rustambek Khudzhaev (Kabadiyan)
Reserve assistant referee:
Rustam Nurmatov (Dushanbe)
Khurshed Dadoboev (Khujand)

Match rules

- 90 minutes
- Penalty shoot-out if scores level
- Seven named substitutes
- Maximum of six substitutions

== See also ==
- 2022 Tajikistan Higher League
- 2022 Tajikistan Cup
