= 2023 Tajikistan Higher League =

Tajikistan Higher League
- Season: 2023
- Dates: 1 April – 18 December
- Champions: Istiklol
- Relegated: Regar-TadAZ; Khatlon
- AFC Champions League Two: Istiklol; Ravshan
- Matches: 110
- Goals: 268 (2.44 per match)
- Top goalscorer: Alisher Dzhalilov (13 goals)
- Biggest home win: Istiklol 5-0 Khatlon (10 May 2023); Istiklol 5-0 Khosilot Farkhor (19 May 2023); Istiklol 5-0 Regar-TadAZ (8 August 2023)
- Biggest away win: Kuktosh Rudaki 0-3 Khosilot Farkhor (6 April 2023); Khatlon 1-4 Kuktosh Rudaki (25 April 2023); Eskhata 0-3 Istiklol (30 June 2023)
- Highest scoring: Khujand 4-3 Eskhata Khujand (9 August 2023)
- Longest winning run: (5 Games); Kuktosh Rudaki
- Longest unbeaten run: (11 Games); Istiklol
- Longest winless run: (8 Games); Regar-TadAZ
- Longest losing run: (6 Games); Khatlon
- Highest attendance: 10,000 - Ravshan Kulob vs Khosilot Farkhor (10 May 2023)
- Lowest attendance: 100 - Khatlon vs Eskhata Khujand (7 April 2023); 100 - Fayzkand vs Eskhata Khujand (23 May 2023)
- Average attendance: 2,968 (19 August 2023)
- All statistics correct as of 18 December 2023.

The 2023 Ligai Olii Tojikiston (Tajik: 2023 Лигаи Олии Тоҷикистон, Russian: 2023 Высшая Лига Таджикистана) or 2023 Tajikistan Higher League, also known as 1xBet Higher League due to sponsorship reasons, was the 32nd season of the Tajikistan Higher League, Tajikistan's top division of association football.

== Season events ==
On 22 February 2022, the Tajikistan Football Federation announced that the season would commence on 1 April, and follow the same format as the previous season. The 10 teams would play each other twice in the regular stage of the season, before splitting into Championship and Relegation groups where they would then play everyone in their group again, resulting in the bottom two teams being relegated from the league.

On 24 February, the Tajikistan Football Federation announced 1xBet as the new title sponsor of the league, as well as the Tajikistan Cup and Tajik Supercup.

On 10 April, the Tajikistan Football Federation announced the VAR would be introduced to the league for the second half of the season.

On 18 April, all five of the fifth round matches scheduled to be held on either 20 April or 21 April, where postponed until 28–30 June due to the original dates falling on Eid al-Fitr.

== Teams ==
On 28 February, the Tajikistan Football Federation confirmed that 10 teams would take part in the 2023 season.

Locations of teams in the 2023 Tajikistan Higher League

Team	Location	Venue	Capacity
CSKA Pamir	Dushanbe	CSKA Stadium	7,000
Eskhata	Khujand	Bistsolagii Istiqloliyati Stadium	20,000
Fayzkand	Hulbuk	Central Stadium	
Istiklol	Dushanbe	Central Republican Stadium	24,000
Khatlon	Bokhtar	Tsentralnyi Stadium	10,000
Khosilot Farkhor	Farkhor	Central Stadium	
Khujand	Khujand	Bistsolagii Istiqloliyati Stadium	20,000
Kuktosh Rudaki	Chorgulteppa	Rudaki Stadium	
Ravshan	Kulob	Central Stadium	
Regar-TadAZ	Tursunzoda	TALCO Arena	10,000

=== Personnel and sponsoring ===
Team	Manager	Captain	Kit manufacturer	Sponsor
CSKA Pamir	(Tajikistan) Shamsiddin Kosimov		Joma	Formula 55
Eskhata	(Russia) Igor Surov		Joma	Bank Eskhata
Fayzkand	(Tajikistan) Jaloliddin Majidov		Joma	—N/a
Istiklol	(Tajikistan) Igor Cherevchenko	(Tajikistan) Alisher Dzhalilov	Joma	Siyoma
Khatlon	(Tajikistan) Asliddin Khabibullaev	(Tajikistan) Umarjon Sharipov	Joma	Parimatch
Khosilot Farkhor	(Iran) Amin Subhoni			
Khujand	(Uzbekistan) Numon Khasanov		Joma	Formula 55
Kuktosh Rudaki	(Uzbekistan) Abdujabbor Marufaliev			
Ravshan Kulob	(Tajikistan) Tokhirjon Muminov		Joma	Hoji Sharif
Regar-TadAZ	(Tajikistan) Aliyor Ashurmamadov		Joma	TALCO

=== Foreign players ===
During the 2023 season, Tajikistan Higher League are able to register seven foreign players, with only five being able to be on the pitch at the same time.

The summer transfer window began on 1 July and is due to close on 28 July.

Club	Player 1	Player 2	Player 3	Player 4	Player 5	Player 6	Player 7	Former Players
CSKA Pamir	(Cameroon) Gerard Bakinde	(Cameroon) Jean Gaten	(Cameroon) Ngatu Ntengu Doirian	(Bahrain) Akhabi Doniel Henri				(Iran) Seyed Hossein Noorbakhshi (Turkmenistan) **Süleýman Muhadow**
Eskhata	(Russia) Vladislav Shevchenko	(Russia) Roman Khibaba	(Uzbekistan) Olim Karimov	(Uzbekistan) Shakhzod Mamurdzhonov	(Uzbekistan) Sanjar Rihsiboev			
Fayzkand	(Cameroon) Nnaga Akhanda	(Cameroon) Bill Obama Arsen	(Cameroon) Arthur Bougnon	(Cameroon) Joseph Feumba	(Cameroon) François Haignegue	(Cameroon) Junior Onana	(South Sudan) Mayen Maja Mayor	(Ghana) Prosper Gbeku (Uzbekistan) Zufarjon Akbaraliev
Istiklol	(Armenia) **Artur Kartashyan**	(Bosnia and Herzegovina) Dženis Beganović	(Croatia) Ivan Novoselec	(Iran) Mojtaba Moghtadaei	(Ivory Coast) Cédric Gogoua	(Ivory Coast) Senin Sebai	(Nigeria) Joseph Okoro	(Ghana) Idriss Aminu
Khatlon	(Ghana) Enoch Aryeetey	(Ghana) Bonnah Derrick	(Ghana) Torsu Christian Dodzi	(Ghana) Kofi Dwomoh	(Ghana) Chris Emmanuel Kakou	(Uzbekistan) Rustamjon Kuchkarov		
Khosilot Farkhor	(Cameroon) Yapequ Kapava	(Cameroon) Franck Michael Nonga	(Ghana) Benjamin Asamoah	(Ghana) Prosper Gbeku	(Ghana) Aryeetey Roger			(Iran) Saeid Asghari Torzani (Iran) Milad Beyrampour (Uganda) Musisi Farouk (Uzbekistan) Temur Mamatmurodov
Khujand	(Cameroon) Tony Bikatal	(Iran) Mehdi Amini zazerani	(Russia) Ramazan Naniev	(Serbia) Dejan Tumbas	(Uzbekistan) Khushnudbek Bozorov	(Uzbekistan) Javokhirbek Rasulov	(Malaysia) (South Korea) Bae Beom-geun	(Russia) Layonel Adams (Serbia) Darko Bjedov
Kuktosh Rudaki	(Ghana) Mohammed Kamal	(Ghana) Anani Julius Kvasi	(Ghana) Abraham Odonkor	(Iran) Mahdi Nourpourasl	(Nigeria) Sundaya Longji Song	(Uzbekistan) Temur Masharipov	(Uzbekistan) Mukhiddin Odilov	
Ravshan Kulob	(Ghana) Joseph Akomadi	(Ghana) Ocran Idan	(Ghana) Emmanuel Maabuah	(Ghana) Samuel Ofori (Defender)	(Tanzania) Emmanuel Mwanengo	(Ukraine) Yevhen Hrytsenko	(Uzbekistan) Akobir Turaev	(Ghana) Chris Emmanuel Kakou
Regar-TadAZ	(Ghana) Prince Arthur	(Ghana) Kuaye Godson	(Uzbekistan) Ramiz Begishev	(Uzbekistan) Sardor Jakhonov	(Uzbekistan) Anvar Murodov	(Uzbekistan) Asilbek Temirov		(Iran) Sheldari Arash

In bold: Players that have been capped for their national team.

=== Managerial changes ===
Team	Outgoing manager	Manner of departure	Date of vacancy	Position in table	Incoming manager	Date of appointment
CSKA Pamir	(Iran) Amin Subhoni			Preseason	(Tajikistan) Akhliddin Turdiev	
Eskhata	(Tajikistan) Khamid Karimov			Preseason	(Russia) Igor Surov	
Fayzkand	(Iran) Masoud Nazarzadeh			Preseason	(Tajikistan) Jaloliddin Majidov	
Istiklol	(Tajikistan) Alisher Tukhtaev (Interim)	Contract Expired		Preseason	(Tajikistan) Igor Cherevchenko	18 January 2023
Ravshan Kulob	(Tajikistan) Boir Gamberdiev			Preseason	(Tajikistan) Tokhir Muminov	
Regar-TadAZ	(Tajikistan) Hikmat Fuzailov			Preseason	(Tajikistan) Aliyor Ashurmamadov	
CSKA Pamir Dushanbe	(Tajikistan) Akhliddin Turdiev		17 April 2023	9th	(Tajikistan) Shamsiddin Kosimov	17 April 2023
Khujand	(Tajikistan) Rustam Khojayev	Resigned	27 April 2023	6th	(Tajikistan) Farrukh Marofiev (Caretaker)	27 April 2023
Khujand	(Tajikistan) Farrukh Marofiev (Caretaker)	End of tenure	30 April 2023	8th	(Uzbekistan) Numon Khasanov	1 May 2023

== Regular season ==
=== League table ===
Pos	Team	Pld	W	D	L	GF	GA	GD	Pts	Qualification or relegation
1	Istiklol (Q)	18	12	4	2	42	8	+34	40	Qualification for Championship round
2	Ravshan Kulob (Q)	18	8	7	3	23	13	+10	31	Qualification for Championship round
3	Kuktosh Rudaki (Q)	18	9	2	7	30	25	+5	29	Qualification for Championship round
4	Eskhata (Q)	18	8	2	8	24	28	−4	26	Qualification for Championship round
5	Fayzkand (Q)	18	6	7	5	24	22	+2	25	Qualification for Championship round
6	Khujand (Q)	18	5	7	6	18	26	−8	22	Below for Relegation Round
7	CSKA Pamir (Q)	18	4	8	6	14	14	0	20	Below for Relegation Round
8	Khosilot Farkhor (Q)	18	5	5	8	14	20	−6	20	Below for Relegation Round
9	Khatlon (Q)	18	5	1	12	11	33	−22	16	Below for Relegation Round
10	Regar-TadAZ (Q)	18	3	7	8	17	28	−11	16	Below for Relegation Round

Updated to match(es) played on 10 September 2023. Source: Soccerway
Rules for classification: 1) Points; 2) Head-to-head points; 3) Head-to-head goal difference; 4) Head-to-head goals scored; 5) Goal difference; 6) Goals scored.
(Q) Qualified for the phase indicated

=== Results ===
Home \ Away	CPD	ESK	FAY	IST	KHA	KHF	KJD	KUK	RAV	REG
CSKA Pamir		3–3	1–1	0–0	0–2	0–0	2–0	0–1	0–0	0–0
Eskhata	3–2		1–0	0–3	1–0	2–1	0–1	2–4	1–1	0–1
Fayzkand	2–0	2–1		1–2	2–0	0–0	1–1	2–1	0–0	5–1
Istiklol	0–0	5–0	2–1		5–0	5–0	4–0	2–0	1–2	5–0
Khatlon	0–3	0–2	0–3	1–3		1–0	2–0	1–4	2–1	1–1
Khosilot Farkhor	0–0	1–0	2–2	0–1	1–0		1–2	3–1	0–2	1–0
Khujand	0–2	4–3	2–2	0–2	1–0	1–0		1–2	0–0	2–2
Kuktosh Rudaki	1–0	0–1	4–0	1–1	3–0	0–3	1–1		0–2	4–2
Ravshan Kulob	1–0	0–3	4–0	1–0	0–1	1–1	1–1	3–1		3–1
Regar-TadAZ	0–1	0–1	0–0	1–1	3–0	2–0	1–1	1–2	1–1	

Updated to match(es) played on 10 September 2023. Source: Soccerway
Legend: Blue = home team win; Yellow = draw; Red = away team win.

=== Results by round ===
Team ╲ Round	1	2	3	4	5	6	7	8	9	10	11	12	13	14	15	16	17	18
CSKA Pamir	L	D	D	D	L	D	L	W	D	W	W	W	D	L	L	D	L	D
Eskhata	W	W	L	W	L	D	L	W	W	L	L	W	W	L	L	L	W	D
Fayzkand	D	L	W	D	W	D	W	L	D	L	W	D	D	W	W	L	L	D
Istiklol	W	W	D	W	W	D	L	W	W	W	W	L	D	W	D	W	W	W
Khatlon	L	L	W	W	L	L	W	L	W	L	L	L	L	L	L	W	L	D
Khosilot Farkhor	D	W	D	L	L	L	W	D	L	L	L	L	W	L	W	D	W	D
Khujand	L	D	W	D	W	D	D	L	L	W	L	L	D	W	D	W	D	L
Kuktosh Rudaki	L	L	L	L	W	W	D	W	L	W	W	W	W	W	D	W	L	L
Ravshan Kulob	W	D	L	D	W	D	W	D	D	W	W	W	L	D	D	L	W	W
Regar-TadAZ	W	D	D	L	L	W	L	L	D	L	L	D	L	D	W	L	D	D

Updated to match(es) played on 10 September 2023. Source:
W = Win; D = Draw; L = Loss; P = Postponed

== Championship round ==
=== Championship round table ===
Pos	Team	Pld	W	D	L	GF	GA	GD	Pts	Qualification or relegation
1	Istiklol (C)	22	16	4	2	56	12	+44	52	Qualification for AFC Champions League Two group stage
2	Ravshan Kulob	22	9	8	5	29	20	+9	35	Qualification for AFC Champions League Two group stage
3	Kuktosh Rudaki	22	10	3	9	38	36	+2	33	
4	Eskhata	22	10	3	9	30	32	−2	33	
5	Fayzkand	22	6	8	8	29	36	−7	26	

Updated to match(es) played on 18 December 2023. Source: Soccerway
Rules for classification: 1) Points; 2) Head-to-head points; 3) Head-to-head goal difference; 4) Head-to-head goals scored; 5) Goal difference; 6) Goals scored.
(C) Champions

=== Results ===
Home \ Away	ESK	FAY	IST	KUK	RAV
Eskhata		0–0			1–0
Fayzkand			1–4	2–6	
Istiklol	4–2				2–0
Kuktosh Rudaki	0–3		1–4		
Ravshan Kulob		4–2		2–2	

Updated to match(es) played on 18 December 2023. Source: Soccerway
Legend: Blue = home team win; Yellow = draw; Red = away team win.

=== Results by round ===
Team ╲ Round	1	2	3	4	5
Eskhata	W	P	D	L	W
Fayzkand	L	L	D	P	L
Istiklol	P	W	W	W	W
Kuktosh Rudaki	L	W	L	D	P
Ravshan Kulob	W	L	P	D	L

Updated to match(es) played on 18 December 2023. Source:
W = Win; D = Draw; L = Loss; P = Postponed

== Relegation round ==
=== Relegation round table ===
Pos	Team	Pld	W	D	L	GF	GA	GD	Pts	Qualification or relegation
6	CSKA Pamir	22	5	11	6	16	15	+1	26	
7	Khujand	22	5	11	6	19	27	−8	26	
8	Khosilot Farkhor	22	6	7	9	17	22	−5	25	
9	Regar-TadAZ (R)	22	5	9	8	21	30	−9	24	Relegation to Tajik First Division
10	Khatlon (R)	22	5	2	15	12	38	−26	17	Relegation to Tajik First Division

Source: Soccerway
Rules for classification: 1) Points; 2) Head-to-head points; 3) Head-to-head goal difference; 4) Head-to-head goals scored; 5) Goal difference; 6) Goals scored.
(R) Relegated

=== Results ===
Home \ Away	CPD	KHA	KHF	KJD	REG
CSKA Pamir		1–0		0–0	
Khatlon			1–3		0–1
Khosilot Farkhor	0–0				0–1
Khujand		0–0	0–0		
Regar-TadAZ	1–1			1–1	

Source: Soccerway
Legend: Blue = home team win; Yellow = draw; Red = away team win.

=== Results by round ===
Team ╲ Round	1	2	3	4	5
CSKA Pamir	W	D	D	D	P
Khatlon	L	P	L	D	L
Khosilot Farkhor	L	D	P	D	W
Khujand	P	D	D	D	D
Regar-TadAZ	W	D	W	P	D

Updated to match(es) played on 2 November 2023. Source:
W = Win; D = Draw; L = Loss; P = Postponed

== Season statistics ==
=== Scoring ===
- First goal of the season: Mukhammad Naskov for Ravshan Kulob against Kuktosh Rudaki. (1 April 2023)

=== Top scorers ===
As of matches played 18 December 2023

Rank	Player	Club	Goals
1	(Tajikistan) Alisher Dzhalilov	Istiklol	13
2	(Tajikistan) Azizbek Sultonov	Kuktosh Rudaki	10
3	(Tajikistan) Manuchekhr Dzhalilov	Istiklol	9
3	(Nigeria) Sundaya Longji Song	Kuktosh Rudaki	9
5	(Tajikistan) Ehson Panjshanbe	Istiklol	8
5	(Tajikistan) Bakhtiyor Zaripov	Eskhata Khujand	8
7	(Tajikistan) Shavkati Hotam	Fayzkand/CSKA Pamir	7
8	(Uzbekistan) Muhiddin Odilov	Kuktosh Rudaki	6
8	(Tajikistan) Alisher Shukurov	Kuktosh Rudaki	6
8	(Ivory Coast) Senin Sebai	Istiklol	6

Own goals:

- (Tajikistan) Safialohi Nazarzoda – Khatlon vs Kuktosh Rudaki 25 April 2023
- (Cameroon) Bonnah Derrick – Khatlon vs Istiklol 24 May 2023
- (Tajikistan) Yokubdzhon Akhmedov – Regar-TadAZ vs Khosilot Farkhor 4 June 2023
- (Russia) Roman Khibaba – Eskhata vs Istiklol 30 June 2023
- (Tajikistan) Sulaimon Sobirov – Kuktosh Rudaki vs Khosilot Farkhor 12 August 2023

=== Hat-tricks ===
Player	For	Against	Result	Date	Ref
(Tajikistan) Bakhtiyor Zaripov	Eskhata Khujand	CSKA Pamir	3–2	2 April 2023	
(Tajikistan) Ehson Panjshanbe	Istiklol	Khatlon	5–0	10 May 2023	
(Tajikistan) Azizbek Sultonov	Kuktosh Rudaki	Eskhata Khujand	2–4	18 May 2023	

=== Attendances ===
As of match played 19 August 2023

==== By round ====
2023 Tajikistan Higher League Attendances
Round	Total	GP.	Avg. Per Game
Round 1	12,200	5	2,440
Round 2	5,600	5	1,120
Round 3	16,900	5	3,380
Round 4	7,500	5	1,500
Round 5	22,300	5	4,460
Round 6	13,600	5	2,720
Round 7	19,200	5	9,600
Round 8	16,850	5	3,370
Round 9	10,100	5	2,020
Round 10	16,800	5	3,360
Round 11	18,750	5	3,750
Round 12	18,100	5	3,620
Round 13	18,700	4	4,675
Round 14	3,800	5	760
Round 15	17,300	5	3,460
Round 16	14,300	5	2,860
Round 17	17,850	5	3,570
Round 18	14,340	5	7,170
Total	264,190	89	2,968

==== By team ====
Team \ Match played	1	2	3	4	6	7	8	9	10	11	12	13	14	5	15	16	17	18	Total	Average
CSKA Pamir	—N/a	1,000	—N/a	200	—N/a	1,000	—N/a	500	—N/a	150	—N/a		300	—N/a	—N/a	500	—N/a	640	4,290	536
Eskhata	200	—N/a	3,700	—N/a	3,200	—N/a	3,000	—N/a	3,500	—N/a	6,000	—N/a	—N/a	5,500	2,700	—N/a	1,000	—N/a	28,800	3,200
Fayzkand	—N/a	—N/a	1,000	—N/a	—N/a	200	—N/a	1,000	—N/a	100	—N/a	600	—N/a	500	200	—N/a	850	1,500	5,750	639
Istiklol	1,500	1,500	—N/a	500	400	—N/a	250	—N/a	1,000	—N/a	6,200	—N/a	200	—N/a	—N/a	300	—N/a	—N/a	11,850	1,317
Khatlon	—N/a	100	—N/a	1,200	4,000	—N/a	—N/a	2,000	—N/a	7,500	3,000	—N/a	1,000	—N/a	—N/a	2,000	—N/a	2,000	22,800	2,533
Khosilot Farkhor	3,000	—N/a	4,000	—N/a	—N/a	6,000	—N/a	5,000	—N/a	7,000	—N/a	5,500	—N/a	7,000	6,500	—N/a	6,000	—N/a	50,000	5,556
Khujand	—N/a	1,800	—N/a	3,800	4,500	—N/a	2,600	—N/a	3,500	—N/a	2,700	—N/a	1,500	—N/a	—N/a	4,500	—N/a	4,200	29,100	3,233
Kuktosh Rudaki	—N/a	1,200	—N/a	—N/a	—N/a	3,000	—N/a	1,600	—N/a	4,000	—N/a	5,600	—N/a	3,800	3,900	7,000	—N/a	6,000	36,100	4,011
Ravshan	6,000	—N/a	6,500	—N/a	—N/a	9,000	10,000	—N/a	6,800	—N/a	—N/a	7,000	—N/a	5,500	4,000	—N/a	8,000	—N/a	62,800	6,978
Regar-TadAZ	1,500	—N/a	1,700	1,800	1,500	—N/a	1,000	—N/a	2,000	—N/a	200	—N/a	800	—N/a	—N/a	—N/a	2,000	—N/a	12,500	1,389

=== Annual awards ===
Award	Winner	Club
Player of the year	(Tajikistan) Rustam Yatimov	Istiklol
Coach of the year	(Tajikistan) Igor Cherevchenko	Istiklol
Top goalscorer	(Tajikistan) Alisher Dzhalilov	Istiklol
Foreign player of the year	(Ukraine) Yevhen Hrytsenko	Ravshan Kulob
Best goalkeeper	(Tajikistan) Rustam Yatimov	Istiklol
Best defender	(Tajikistan) Kholmurod Nazarov	Ravshan Kulob
Best midfielder	(Tajikistan) Amadoni Kamolov	Istiklol
Best striker	(Tajikistan) Manuchekhr Dzhalilov	Istiklol
