= Alidzhoni Ayni =

Tajikistani professional football player

Personal information
- Full name: Burizod Alidzhoni Ayni
- Date of birth: 6 August 2004 (age 22)
- Place of birth: Kulob, Tajikistan
- Height: 1.66 m (5 ft 5 in)
- Position: Midfielder

Team information
- Current team: Istiklol

Youth career
- Lokomotiv-Pamir
- 2021: Krasnodar

Senior career*
Years	Team	Apps	(Gls)
2022	Regar-TadAZ	8	(1)
2022–2024	Krasnodar-2	2	(0)
2023	→ Istiklol (loan)	17	(1)
2024–2026	Samgurali	32	(0)
2026–	Istiklol	2	(0)

International career^{‡}
2019	Tajikistan U16	9	(0)
2020–	Tajikistan U17	7	(2)
2021–	Tajikistan	12	(0)
- * Club domestic league appearances and goals as of 12:43, 15 July 2026 (UTC) ‡ National team caps and goals as of 07:43, 18 January 2024 (UTC)

Burizod Alidzhoni Ayni (Tajik: Алиҷони Айни, Russian: Алиджони Айни; born 6 August 2004) is a Tajik professional footballer who plays as a midfielder for Tajik club Istiklol, and the Tajikistan national team.

== Career ==
=== Club ===
During the 2022 summer transfer window, Ayni left Regar-TadAZ for whom he played for during the first half of the 2022 season.

On 11 August 2022, Ayni signed a five-year contract with Russian Premier League club Krasnodar and was initially assigned to the reserves team, Krasnodar-2.

On 18 February 2023, Ayni signed for Istiklol on loan until the end of 2023.

In February 2024, Ayni moved to Erovnuli Liga club Samgurali in Georgia.

On 5 March 2026, Istiklol announced the signing of Ayni from Samgurali Tskaltubo.

=== International ===
In March 2021, Ayni was called up to the Tajikistan national team for the first time, as a replacement for Iskandar Dzhalilov who'd suffered a dislocated foot and fracture lower leg. Ayni subsequently made his senior team debut on 25 March 2021 against Mongolia, coming on as an 85th-minute substitute for Parvizdzhon Umarbayev.

== Career statistics ==
As of match played 28 June 2026

Appearances and goals by club, season and competition
Club	Season	League			National Cup (Note: Includes Russian Cup, Tajikistan Cup, Georgian Cup)		League Cup		Continental		Other		Total	
Club	Season	Division	Apps	Goals	Apps	Goals	Apps	Goals	Apps	Goals	Apps	Goals	Apps	Goals
Krasnodar-2	2022–23	Russian First League	2	0	–								2	0
Istiklol (loan)	2023	Tajikistan Higher League	17	1	3	0	–		0 (Note: Appearances and goals in the AFC Champions League)	0	1 (Note: Appearances in the Tajik Supercup)	0	21	1
Samgurali	2024	Erovnuli Liga	4	0	0	0	–						4	0
Samgurali	2025	Erovnuli Liga	28	0	0	0	–						28	0
Samgurali	Total		32	0	0	0	-	-	0	0	0	0	32	0
Istiklol	2026	Tajikistan Higher League	2	0	0	0	–		0 (Note: Appearances and goals in the AFC Challenge League)	0	0	0	2	0
Career total			53	1	3	0	-	-	0	0	1	0	57	1

=== International ===
Tajikistan national team
Year	Apps	Goals
2021	3	0
2022	3	0
2023	4	0
2024	2	0
Total	12	0

Statistics accurate as of match played 17 January 2024

== Honours ==
Istiklol

- Tajikistan Higher League: 2023
- Tajikistan Cup: 2023
