= Mojtaba Moghtadaei =

Iranian footballer

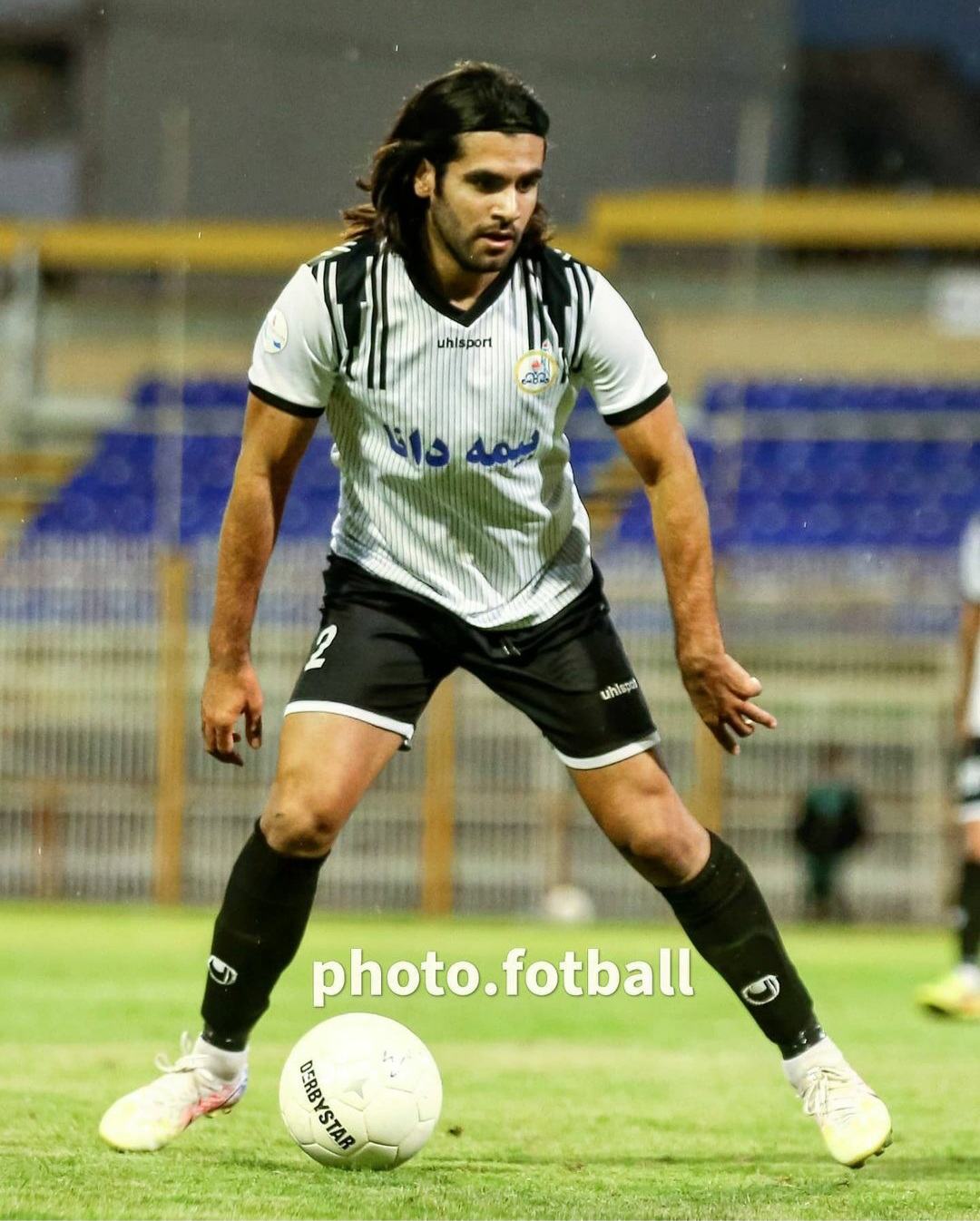

Personal information
- Date of birth: 20 March 1996 (age 30)
- Place of birth: Abadan, Iran
- Height: 1.77 m (5 ft 9 1/2 in)
- Position: Right back

Team information
- Current team: Pars Jonoubi Jam
- Number: 2

Youth career
- –2016: Sanat Naft

Senior career*
Years	Team	Apps	(Gls)
2016–2017	Shahin Mahshahr		
2017–2018	Sanat Naft Novin		
2018–2019	Zob Ahan	8	(0)
2020–2023	Naft Masjed Soleyman	49	(0)
2023	Istiklol	5	(0)
2024–	Pars Jonoubi Jam	5	(0)
- * Club domestic league appearances and goals as of 21 April 2025

Mojtaba Moghtadaei (Persian: مجتبی مقتدایی; born 20 March 1996) is an Iranian footballer who plays as a right back for Pars Jonoubi Jam in the Azadegan League.

== Club career ==
=== Zob Ahan ===
He made his debut for Zob Ahan in 6th fixtures of 2018–19 Iran Pro League against Padideh while he substituted in for Milad Fakhreddini.

On 18 July 2023, Moghtadaei signed a one-year contract with Tajikistan Higher League club Istiklol. On 21 December 2023, Istiklol announced the departure of Moghtadaei after his contract had expired.

== Career statistics ==
As of match played 1 November 2023

Appearances and goals by club, season and competition
Club	Season	League			National Cup		League Cup		Continental		Other		Total	
Club	Season	Division	Apps	Goals	Apps	Goals	Apps	Goals	Apps	Goals	Apps	Goals	Apps	Goals
Istiklol	2023	Tajikistan Higher League	5	0	4	0	–		0 (Note: Appearances in the AFC Champions League)	0	0 (Note: Appearances in the Tajik Supercup)	0	9	0
Career total			5	0	4	0	-	-	0	0	0	0	9	0

== Honours ==
Istiklol

- Tajikistan Higher League: 2023
- Tajikistan Cup: 2023
