= Senin Sebai =

Ivorian footballer (born 1993)

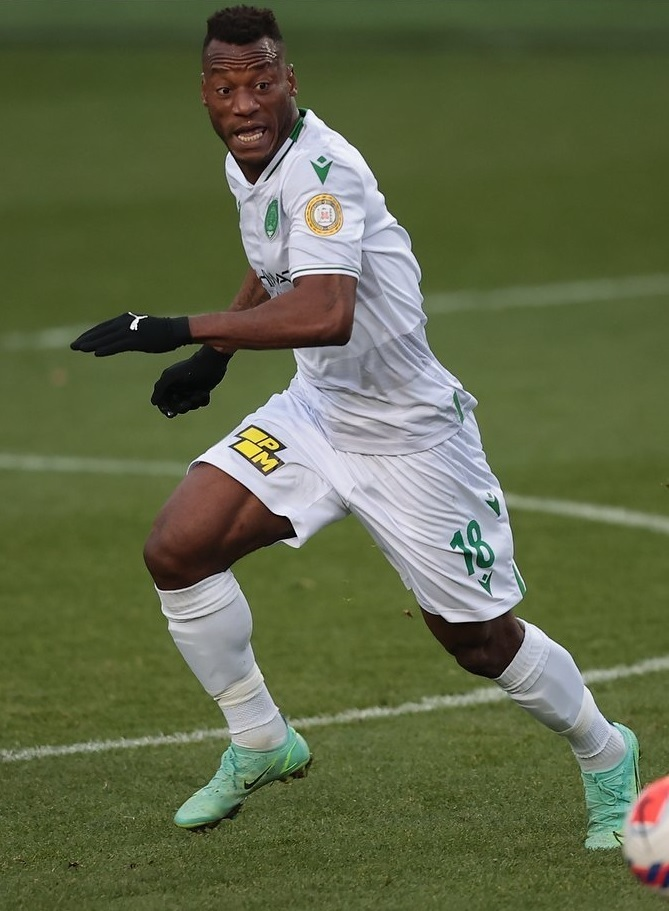
- Sebai with Akhmat Grozny in 2021

Personal information
- Full name: Senin Hyacinthe Sebai
- Date of birth: 18 December 1993 (age 32)
- Place of birth: Abidjan, Ivory Coast
- Height: 1.82 m (6 ft 0 in)
- Position: Forward

Youth career
- Egnanda de Zaranou

Senior career*
Years	Team	Apps	(Gls)
2014–2015	Saxan	14	(4)
2015	→ Astra Giurgiu (loan)	3	(0)
2015–2017	Slutsk	32	(7)
2017–2018	Baltika Kaliningrad	31	(10)
2018	Tambov	20	(8)
2019–2020	Tobol	40	(10)
2021	Khimki	14	(0)
2021–2022	Akhmat Grozny	17	(3)
2022–2023	Ironi Kiryat Shmona	28	(5)
2023	Istiklol	8	(6)
2024	Al-Jandal	13	(4)
2024–2025	Kyzylzhar	32	(11)
2026	Lee Man	9	(1)
- * Club domestic league appearances and goals as of 17 May 2026

Senin Sebai (born 18 December 1993) is an Ivorian professional footballer who plays as a striker.

== Club career ==
In 2014, he joined Moldovan side Saxan. In March 2015, he was loaned to Romanian Astra Giurgiu until the end of the season. In the summer of 2015, he joined Belarusian FC Slutsk.

On 21 June 2017, Sebai signed a one-year contract with FC Baltika Kaliningrad. On 8 June 2018, he signed a one-year contract with another Russian club, FC Tambov.

In February 2019, he moved to FC Tobol.

On 4 January 2021, he moved to FC Khimki on a free transfer. Khimki officially confirmed the transfer on 15 January 2021.

On 7 September 2021, he moved to FC Akhmat Grozny, also in the Russian Premier League. Sebai left Akhmat on 31 May 2022 upon the expiration of his contract.

On 7 June 2022, Sebai signed a three-year contract with Ironi Kiryat Shmona in Israel.

On 15 July 2023, Istiklol announced the signing of Sebai on a one-year contract. On 21 December 2023, Istiklol announced the departure of Sebai after his contract had expired.

On 29 January 2024, Sebai joined Saudi club Al-Jandal.

On 12 January 2026, Sebai joined Hong Kong Premier League club Lee Man.

== Career statistics ==
=== Club ===
As of match played 15 December 2023

Appearances and goals by club, season and competition
Club	Season	League			National Cup		League Cup		Continental		Other		Total	
Club	Season	Division	Apps	Goals	Apps	Goals	Apps	Goals	Apps	Goals	Apps	Goals	Apps	Goals
Saxan Gagauz Yeri	2014–15	Divizia Națională	14	4	0	0	–		–		–		14	4
Saxan Gagauz Yeri	2015–16	Divizia Națională	–		–		–		1 (Note: Appearances in the UEFA Europa League)	0	–		1	0
Saxan Gagauz Yeri	Total		14	4	0	0	0	0	1	0	0	0	15	4
Astra Giurgiu (loan)	2014–15	Liga I	3	0	0	0	–		–		–		3	0
Slutsk	2015	BPL	7	1	2	1	–		–		–		9	2
Slutsk	2016	BPL	13	2	1	0	–		–		–		14	2
Slutsk	2017	BPL	12	4	4	1	–		–		–		16	5
Slutsk	Total		32	7	7	2	0	0	0	0	0	0	39	9
Baltika Kaliningrad	2017–18	FNL	31	10	0	0	–		–		–		31	10
Tambov	2018–19	FNL	20	8	2	0	–		–		–		22	8
Tobol	2019	KPL	26	8	1	0	–		2	0	–		29	8
Tobol	2020	KPL	14	2	0	0	–		–		–		14	2
Tobol	Total		40	10	1	0	0	0	2	0	0	0	43	10
Khimki	2020–21	RPL	8	0	0	0	–		–		–		8	0
Khimki	2021–22	RPL	6	0	0	0	–		–		–		6	0
Khimki	Total		14	0	0	0	0	0	0	0	0	0	14	0
Akhmat Grozny	2021–22	RPL	17	3	2	0	–		–		–		19	3
Ironi Kiryat Shmona	2022–23	Ligat Ha`Al	28	5	1	0	3	0	–		–		32	5
Istiklol	2023	Tajikistan Higher League	8	6	5	1	–		6 (Note: Appearances in the AFC Champions League)	2	0 (Note: Appearances in the Tajik Supercup)	0	19	9
Career total			207	53	17	3	3	0	9	2	0	0	236	58

== Honours ==
Istiklol

- Tajik League: 2023
- Tajik Cup: 2023

Lee Man

- Hong Kong League Cup: 2025–26
