= Ivan Dyagolchenko =

Russian footballer

Personal information
- Full name: Ivan Alekseyevich Dyagolchenko
- Date of birth: 2 November 1980 (age 45)
- Height: 1.86 m (6 ft 1 in)
- Position: Defender

Senior career*
Years	Team	Apps	(Gls)
1998	FC SKA Rostov-on-Don		
2000	FC Torpedo Taganrog	19	(0)
2001	FC Spartak-Kavkaztransgaz Izobilny	7	(0)
2001–2002	FC Spartak Shchyolkovo	49	(0)
2003	FC Arsenal Tula	9	(0)
2004	FC Spartak Shchyolkovo	28	(3)
2005	Regar-TadAZ Tursunzoda		
2006	FC Vostok	27	(3)
2007–2008	FC Zvezda Irkutsk	6	(0)
2008	FC Bataysk-2007	13	(2)
2009	FC Gubkin	30	(4)
2010	FC Dynamo Saint Petersburg	4	(0)
2010	FC MITOS Novocherkassk	9	(2)
2011	FC Sokol Saratov	1	(0)
- * Club domestic league appearances and goals

Ivan Alekseyevich Dyagolchenko (Russian: Иван Алексеевич Дьягольченко; born 2 November 1980) is a former Russian professional footballer.

== Club career ==
He made his Russian Football National League debut for FC Zvezda Irkutsk on 28 March 2007 in a game against FC Mashuk-KMV Pyatigorsk.
