= Amadoni Kamolov =

Tajikistani professional football player

Personal information
- Date of birth: 16 January 2003 (age 23)
- Place of birth: Kulob, Tajikistan
- Height: 1.75 m (5 ft 9 in)
- Position: Midfielder

Youth career
- –2019: Lokomotiv-Pamir
- 2021–2022: Rayo Majadahonda

Senior career*
Years	Team	Apps	(Gls)
2020–2021	Istiklol	5	(0)
2022–2023	Paracuellos MX	3	(0)
2023–2025	Istiklol	29	(8)
2025–2026	Gol Gohar Sirjan	13	(0)

International career^{‡}
2019	Tajikistan U17	3	(0)
2022	Tajikistan U19	1	(0)
2022–	Tajikistan U23	7	(0)
2023–	Tajikistan	14	(2)
- * Club domestic league appearances and goals as of 2 May 2025 ‡ National team caps and goals as of 10 June 2025

Amadoni Kamolov (Tajik: Амадони Камолов; born 16 January 2003) is a Tajik professional footballer who last played for Iranian club Gol Gohar Sirjan and the Tajikistan national team.

== Career ==
=== Club career ===
On 6 April 2021, Kamolov left Istiklol to join Rayo Majadahonda.

On 18 February 2023, Istiklol announced the return of Kamolov from Paracuellos Antamira on a two-year contract.

On 13 January 2025, Istiklol announced that Kamolov had left the club to sign a two-year contract with Persian Gulf Pro League club Gol Gohar Sirjan.

=== International career ===
On 4 January 2024, Kamolov was named in Tajikistan's squad for the 2023 AFC Asian Cup. In the team's second match, a 1–0 loss to tournament hosts Qatar on 17 January 2024, Kamolov was the first player to be sent off in the tournament when he was shown a red card for violent conduct in the 81st minute.

== Career statistics ==
=== Club ===
As of match played 28 February 2025

Appearances and goals by club, season and competition
Club	Season	League			National Cup		League Cup		Continental		Other		Total	
Club	Season	Division	Apps	Goals	Apps	Goals	Apps	Goals	Apps	Goals	Apps	Goals	Apps	Goals
Istiklol	2020	Tajikistan Higher League	7	0	1	0	–		0 (Note: Appearances in the AFC Champions League and AFC Cup)	0	0 (Note: Appearances in the Tajik Supercup)	0	8	0
Paracuellos MX	2022–23	Tercera Federación Group 7	3	0	0	0	–						3	0
Istiklol	2023	Tajikistan Higher League	20	4	5	0	–		6 (Note: Appearances in the AFC Champions League)	0	1	0	32	4
Istiklol	2024	Tajikistan Higher League	10	4	0	0	–		3 (Note: Appearances in the AFC Champions League Two)	0	1	0	14	4
Istiklol	Total		30	8	5	0	-	-	9	0	2	0	46	8
Gol Gohar Sirjan	2024–25	Persian Gulf Pro League	6	0	0	0	–						6	0
Career total			47	8	6	0	-	-	9	0	2	0	64	8

=== International ===
As of match played 10 June 2025

National team	Year	Apps	Goals
Tajikistan	2023	2	2
Tajikistan	2024	8	0
Tajikistan	2025	4	0
Total		14	2

=== International goals ===
Scores and results list Tajikistan's goal tally first.

No.	Date	Venue	Opponent	Score	Result	Competition
1.	21 November 2023	Jinnah Sports Stadium, Islamabad, Pakistan	Pakistan	1–0	6–1	2026 FIFA World Cup qualification
2.	21 November 2023	Jinnah Sports Stadium, Islamabad, Pakistan	Pakistan	5–1	6–1	2026 FIFA World Cup qualification

== Honors ==
Istiklol

- Tajikistan Higher League (2): 2020, 2023
- Tajikistan Cup (1): 2023
- Tajik Supercup (1): 2024

=== Individual ===
- Tajikistan Higher League Best Midfielder: 2023
