= Musa Ibragimov =

Russian footballer (born 1996)

Personal information
- Full name: Musa Isayevich Ibragimov
- Date of birth: 28 May 1996 (age 30)
- Place of birth: Krasnoyarsk, Russia
- Height: 1.76 m (5 ft 9 1/2 in)
- Position: Midfielder

Youth career
- 2011–2015: Yenisey Krasnoyarsk

Senior career*
Years	Team	Apps	(Gls)
2016	Yenisey Krasnoyarsk	2	(1)
2017	Volga Tver	8	(0)
2017–2018	Nosta Novotroitsk	22	(2)
2019	Volna Pinsk	13	(2)
2020	Khimik Svetlogorsk	7	(1)
2021	Ravshan Kulob	8	(0)
2022	Veles-2020 Vitebsk	8	(1)
2022–2023	Kyzyltash Bakhchisaray	11	(0)
2023	Peresvet Domodedovo	12	(3)
2023–2024	Kompozit Pavlovsky Posad	21	(4)
2024	Ocean Kerch	8	(1)
2025	Kolomna	5	(0)
- * Club domestic league appearances and goals as of 2 November 2025

Musa Isayevich Ibragimov (Russian: Муса Исаевич Ибрагимов; born 28 May 1996) is a Russian football player.

== Club career ==
He made his debut in the Russian Football National League for FC Yenisey Krasnoyarsk on 12 March 2016 in a game against FC Baikal Irkutsk and scored on his debut.
