= Masoud Nazarzadeh =

Iranian footballer

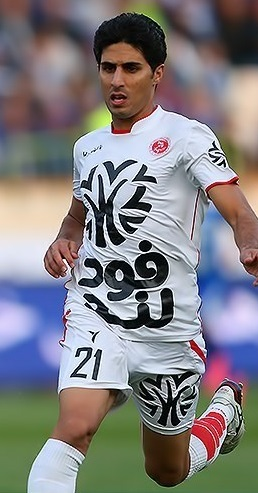

Personal information
- Full name: Masoud Nazarzadeh
- Date of birth: 10 April 1983 (age 43)
- Place of birth: Iran
- Positions: Right back; right winger

Team information
- Current team: Fayzkand (manager)

Youth career
- 2005–2007: Mes Rafsanjan

Senior career*
Years	Team	Apps	(Gls)
2007–2008	Mes Rafsanjan		(5)
2008–2010	Bargh Shiraz	58	(2)
2010–2012	Shahin Bushehr	64	(2)
2012–2014	Mes Kerman	2	(0)
2013–2016	Padideh	21	(2)
2016–2017	Shahin Bushehr		
2017–2018	Iranjavan Bushehr		
2018	Vahdat Bushehr		
2019	Persepolis Ganaveh		

Managerial career
- 2022–: Fayzkand
- * Club domestic league appearances and goals as of 1 April 2022

Masoud Nazarzadeh (Persian: مسعود نظرزاده; born 10 April 1983) is a retired Iranian footballer who is the current manager of Fayzkand in the Tajikistan Higher League.

== Career ==
=== Club ===
Nazarzadeh joined Shahin Bushehr in 2010 after spending the previous two seasons at Bargh Shiraz.

=== Managerial ===
Nazarzadeh was named as Fayzkand's Head Coach during their squad announcement for the 2022 Tajikistan Higher League season.

=== Club career statistics ===
Club performance			League		Cup		Continental		Total	
Season	Club	League	Apps	Goals	Apps	Goals	Apps	Goals	Apps	Goals
Iran			League		Hazfi Cup		Asia		Total	
2007–08	Mes Rafsanjan	Division 1		5			–	–		
2008–09	Bargh Shiraz	Pro League	32	2			–	–		
2009–10	Bargh Shiraz	Division 1	26	0			–	–		
2010–11	Shahin	Pro League	33	1	1	0	–	–	33	1
2011–12	Shahin	Pro League	31	1			–	–		
2012–13	Mes Kerman	Pro League	2	0	0	0	–	–	2	0
2013–14	Padideh	Division 1	20	2	1	0	–	–	21	2
2014–15	Padideh	Pro League	1	0	0	0	–	–	1	0
Career total				11			0	0		

== Honours ==
=== Club ===
Shahin Bushehr

- Hazfi Cup Runner up (1): 2011–12

Padideh

- Azadegan League (1): 2013–14
