= Laud Quartey =

Ghanaian footballer

Personal information
- Full name: Laud Quartey
- Date of birth: March 11, 1984 (age 42)
- Place of birth: Ghana
- Height: 1.85 m (6 ft 1 in)
- Position: Goalkeeper

Youth career
- Aquinas Secondary School
- Takoradi Polytechnic

Senior career*
Years	Team	Apps	(Gls)
2002–2012	Hearts of Oak		
2014	Vakhsh Qurghonteppa		
- * Club domestic league appearances and goals

Laud Quartey (born 11 March 1984 in Ghana) is a Ghanaian football player who last played for Tajik League side Vakhsh Qurghonteppa.

== Career ==
Quartey began his career 2001 with Accra Hearts of Oak SC and was on 2 December 2009 linked with a movement to Young Africans.

In December 2012 Quartey left Hearts of Oak. In April 2014, whilst on trial in Asia, Quartey was linked with a move back to Hearts of Oak due to their on-going injury crisis.
