= Denis Dereshev =

Russian footballer

Personal information
- Full name: Denis Nikolayevich Dereshev
- Date of birth: 10 August 1978 (age 48)
- Height: 1.76 m (5 ft 9 1/2 in)
- Position: Midfielder

Youth career
- FC Organik Dzerzhinsk

Senior career*
Years	Team	Apps	(Gls)
1996–1997	FC Lokomotiv Nizhny Novgorod	2	(0)
1996–1997	→ FC Lokomotiv-d Nizhny Novgorod (loans)	34	(0)
1997	FC Torpedo Pavlovo	16	(0)
1998	FC Lokomotiv Nizhny Novgorod	0	(0)
1998–2000	FC Torpedo Pavlovo	57	(2)
2000	FC Lokomotiv Nizhny Novgorod	3	(0)
2001–2002	FC Torpedo Pavlovo	34	(0)
2002	FC Lokomotiv Nizhny Novgorod (amateur)		
2003	FC Torpedo Pavlovo	29	(2)
2004	Regar-TadAZ Tursunzoda		
2005–2007	FC Khimik Dzerzhinsk (amateur)		
- * Club domestic league appearances and goals

Denis Nikolayevich Dereshev (Russian: Денис Николаевич Дерешев; born 10 August 1978) is a former Russian football player.

== Honours ==
Regar-TadAZ Tursunzoda

- Tajik League champion: 2004
