= Cédric Gogoua =

Ivorian footballer (born 1994)

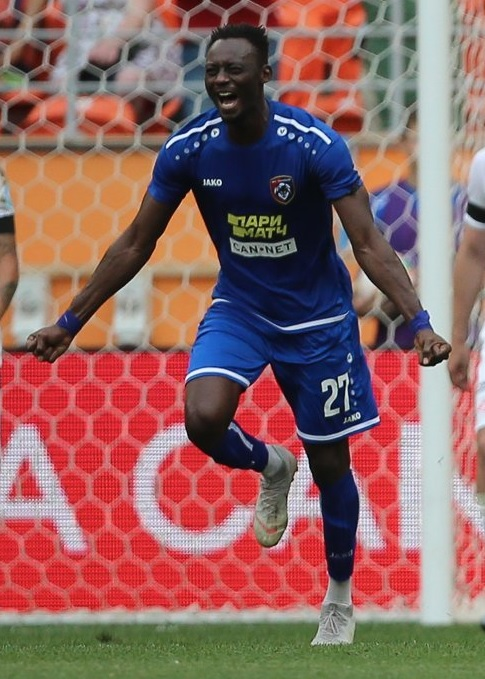
- Gogoua with Tambov in 2019

Personal information
- Full name: Aboussy Cédric Gogoua Kouamé
- Date of birth: 10 July 1994 (age 32)
- Place of birth: Abidjan, Ivory Coast
- Height: 1.90 m (6 ft 3 in)
- Position: Centre-back

Youth career
- Sabé Sports de Bouna

Senior career*
Years	Team	Apps	(Gls)
2010–2012	Africa Sports		
2013–2014	Issia Wazy		
2014–2016	SJK	59	(3)
2014	→ Kerho 07 (loan)	3	(0)
2016	Partizan	17	(1)
2017	Riga	0	(0)
2017	Kairat-A	7	(1)
2017–2018	Kairat	0	(0)
2018	SKA-Khabarovsk	0	(0)
2019	Daugavpils	0	(0)
2019	Tambov	5	(2)
2019–2021	CSKA Moscow	4	(1)
2020–2021	→ Rotor Volgograd (loan)	22	(0)
2022	Turan	0	(0)
2023	Istiklol	14	(0)
2024	Shinnik Yaroslavl	11	(0)
2024	Khimki	3	(0)
2025	Shinnik Yaroslavl	5	(1)
2026	Rajasthan United	2	(0)

International career
- Ivory Coast U17
- Ivory Coast U20
- * Club domestic league appearances and goals as of 30 October 2026

Aboussy Cédric Gogoua Kouamé (born 10 July 1994) is an Ivorian professional footballer who plays as a centre-back, most recently for Rajasthan United.

Gogoua began his career at Sabé Sports de Bouna, but he did not break through and moved on to Africa Sports in 2010. Four years later, he joined Finnish club SJK. He was at the club two years and helped the club win the Veikkausliiga title for the first time in history. Gogoua was also named for best defender of Veikkausliiga in 2014. In January 2016, he signed for Serbian club Partizan.

== Club career ==
=== Early career ===
Born in Abidjan, Gogoua started out his senior career with Africa Sports in early 2010, at the age of 15. He was then a member of the team that won the national league in 2011. Afterwards, Gogoua unexpectedly left the club in March 2012, allegedly going on a trial to Thailand. At that time he had been with the club for three years, ever since he joined Africa Sports coming from Sabé Sports de Bouna. He subsequently spent some time playing with Issia Wazy, before moving abroad to Finland.

=== SJK ===
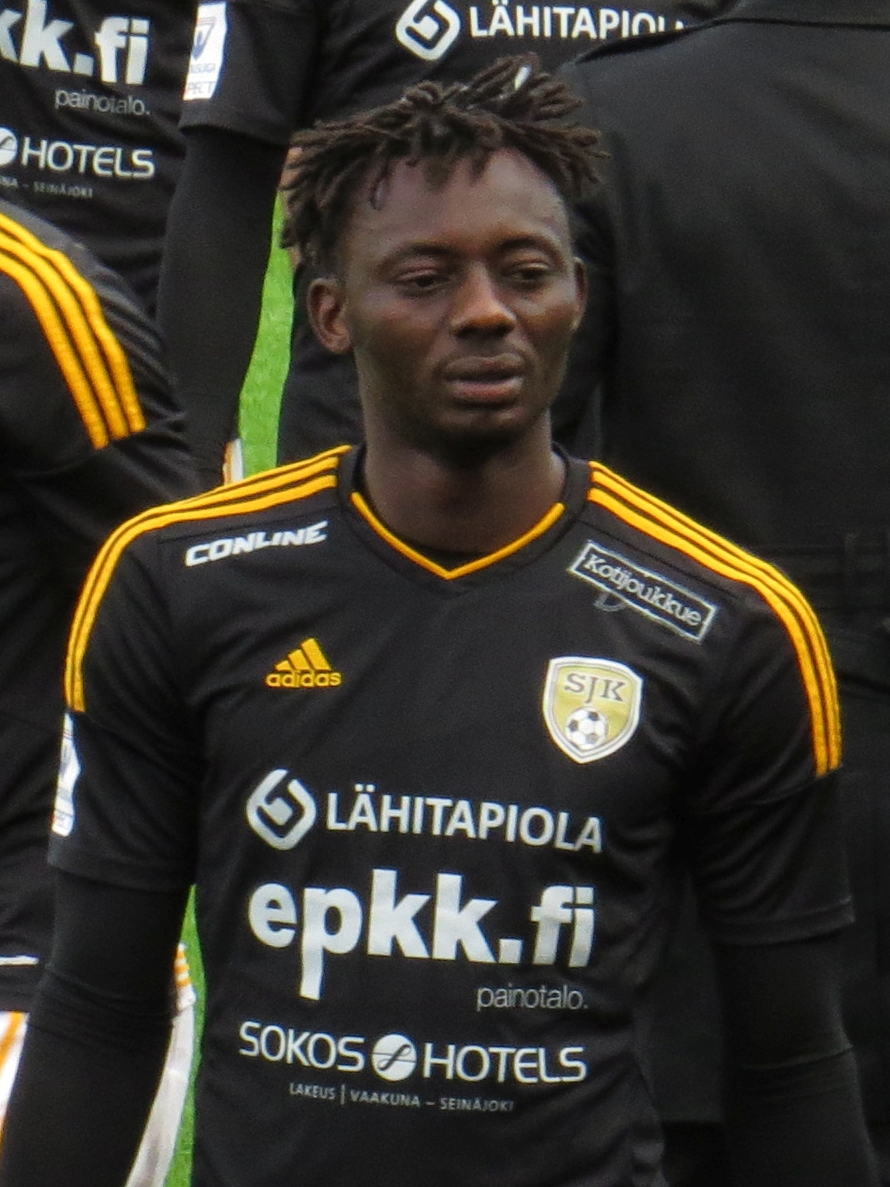
Gogoua with SJK Seinäjoki in 2015

In April 2014, after a successful trial at the club, Gogoua signed a permanent contract with Veikkausliiga club SJK Seinäjoki. He initially played for their reserve side Kerho 07, before being promoted to the main squad. Eventually, Gogoua made his debut for SJK on 17 May 2014, playing the full 90 minutes in a 3–0 home league win over IFK Mariehamn. He scored his first goal for the club in a 3–1 home league victory over MYPA on 25 October 2014. Due to his performances, Gogoua was named the league's best defender in 2014, as the club finished as runners-up to HJK. He subsequently helped them win the league in the following season, the first title in the club's history. Gogoua has played both matches in first qualifying round of 2015–16 UEFA Europa League against FH. In November 2015, Gogoua signed a one-year extension to his contract, keeping him at SJK until the end of 2017.

=== Partizan ===
On 17 January 2016, Gogoua officially joined Serbian club Partizan, penning a four-year deal and choosing the number 51 jersey for a fee of €300.000. He was joined by his compatriot, Ismaël Béko Fofana. On 27 February 2016, Gogoua made his official debut for the club in an Eternal derby against Red Star Belgrade and scored the leading goal for Partizan. He was rumoured to have been arrested in Belgrade for driving under the influence of alcohol, after which he left the club and country abruptly.

=== Riga ===
On 24 January 2017, Gogoua joined Kazakhstan club Aktobe on trial. At the end of the 2017 Latvian winter transfer window, Gogoua was listed as having joined Riga FC.

In June 2017, Gogoua went on trial with FC SKA-Khabarovsk, and then FC Rostov.

=== Kairat-A ===
In July 2017, Gogoua and Mohamed Konaté joined FC Kairat's academy side Kairat-A until the end of the 2017 season.

=== Kairat ===
On 13 November 2017, FC Kairat announced the signing of Gogoua on a two-year contract, with the option of an additional year.

=== SKA-Khabarovsk ===
On 24 August 2018, Gogoua signed with the Russian club FC SKA-Khabarovsk, but was released from his contract by mutual consent on 14 November 2018 without playing any league games for the team.

=== Tambov ===
For the 2019–20 season he joined Russian club FC Tambov. On his Russian Premier League debut on 27 July 2019 (which was also Tambov's first ever home Russian Premier League game), he scored the first goal in Tambov's 2–0 victory over FC Spartak Moscow. He scored again in his third game on 10 August, an away 2–2 draw against FC Orenburg.

=== CSKA Moscow ===
After just five games for Tambov, on 29 August 2019, Gogoua signed a 4-year contract with CSKA Moscow. On his CSKA debut on 1 September 2019, Gogoua scored the winning goal in a 2–1 away comeback victory over FC Arsenal Tula.

On 8 November 2021, Gogoua left CSKA by mutual consent.

==== Rotor Volgograd (loan) ====
On 5 August 2020, Gogoua joined Rotor Volgograd on a season-long loan deal from CSKA Moscow, without the option to make the move permanent.

=== Turan ===
On 20 February 2022, Kazakhstan Premier League club Turan announced the signing of Gogoua. In April 2022, Gogoua left Turan after failing to obtain a visa to work in Kazakhstan.

=== Istiklol ===
In February 2023, Gogoua went on trial with Tajikistan Higher League club Istiklol, being announced as a member of their squad for the season on 31 March 2023. On 21 December 2023, Istiklol announced the departure of Gogoua after his contract had expired.

=== Shinnik Yaroslavl ===
On 16 February 2024, Shinnik Yaroslavl announced the signing of Gogoua on a contract until the end of the 2023–24 season. On 12 July 2024, Shinnik confirmed the departure of Gogoua from the club at the end of his contract.

=== Khimki ===
On 16 July 2024, Gogoua signed with Khimki, returning to the Russian Premier League. Gogoua left Khimki on 1 February 2025.

=== Return to Shinnik ===
On 7 February 2025, Gogoua returned to Shinnik Yaroslavl. He left Shinnik on 3 June 2025.

=== Rajasthan United ===
On 22 February 2026, Indian Football League club Rajasthan United announced the signing of Gogoua.

== International career ==
Gogoua represented Ivory Coast at Under-17 and Under-20 level.

== Style of play ==
Gogoua has been described as having the speed to keep track of smaller, quicker attackers and the strength to compete with more physical opponents. He has also been noted for his passing and game review, and has played as a defensive midfielder. While playing in Finland, Gogoua was called one of the best players in Veikkausliiga and was nicknamed Dominator.

== Career statistics ==
As of match played 6 March 2026

Appearances and goals by club, season and competition
Club	Season	League			National Cup		League Cup		Continental		Other		Total	
Club	Season	Division	Apps	Goals	Apps	Goals	Apps	Goals	Apps	Goals	Apps	Goals	Apps	Goals
SJK	2014	Veikkausliiga	23	1	0	0	0	0	–		–		23	1
SJK	2015	Veikkausliiga	29	2	1	0	4	0	2	0	–		35	2
SJK	Total		51	3	1	0	4	0	2	0	0	0	58	3
Kerho 07 (loan)	2014	Kakkonen	3	0	0	0	0	0	–		–		3	0
Partizan	2015–16	Serbian SuperLiga	8	1	4	0	–		0	0	–		12	1
Partizan	2016–17	Serbian SuperLiga	3	0	0	0	–		2	0	–		5	0
Partizan	Total		11	1	4	0	0	0	2	0	0	0	17	1
Riga	2017	Virslīga	0	0	0	0	–		–		–		0	0
Kairat-A	2017	Kazakhstan First Division	7	1	0	0	–		–		–		7	1
Kairat	2018	Kazakhstan Premier League	0	0	0	0	–		0	0	1 (Note: Appearances in the Kazakhstan Super Cup)	0	1	0
FC Tambov	2019–20	Russian Premier League	5	2	0	0	–		0	0	0	0	5	2
CSKA Moscow	2019–20	Russian Premier League	4	1	0	0	–		1	0	0	0	5	1
CSKA Moscow	2020–21	Russian Premier League	0	0	0	0	–		0	0	0	0	0	0
CSKA Moscow	Total		4	1	0	0	-	-	1	0	0	0	5	1
Rotor Volgograd (loan)	2020–21	Russian Premier League	22	0	0	0	–		–		–		22	0
Istiklol	2023	Tajikistan Higher League	14	0	1	1	–		4 (Note: Appearances in the AFC Champions League)	0	1 (Note: Appearances in the Tajik Supercup)	0	20	1
Shinnik Yaroslavl	2023–24	Russian First League	11	0	—		—		—		—		11	0
Khimki	2024–25	Russian Premier League	3	0	1	0	—		—		—		4	0
Shinnik Yaroslavl	2025–26	Russian First League	5	1	0	0	—		—		—		5	1
Rajasthan United	2025–26	Indian Football League	2	0	0	0	—		—		—		2	0
Career total			138	9	7	1	4	0	9	0	2	0	160	10

== Honours ==
Africa Sports

- Ivorian Ligue 1: 2011

SJK

- Veikkausliiga: 2015

Partizan

- Serbian Cup: 2015–16

Istiklol

- Tajikistan Higher League: 2023
- Tajikistan Cup: 2023

Individual

- Veikkausliiga Best Defender: 2014
