= Igor Surov =

Russian footballer

Personal information
- Full name: Igor Aleksandrovich Surov
- Date of birth: 16 November 1985 (age 40)
- Place of birth: Chelbasskaya, Krasnodar Krai, Russian SFSR
- Height: 1.88 m (6 ft 2 in)
- Position: Defender

Youth career
- Olimpik Krasnodar

Senior career*
Years	Team	Apps	(Gls)
2004–2005	FC Dynamo Krasnodar		
2006	FC Kolos Timashyovsk		
2007	Politehnica Chişinău	8	(0)
2008	TEKS Ivanteyevka		
2008	Saturn-2 Moscow Oblast	15	(0)
2009–2010	Rusichi Oryol	51	(0)
2011	Olimpia Gelendzhik	9	(0)
2011–2014	Yakutiya Yakutsk	61	(2)
2014	Volga Ulyanovsk	13	(0)
2015	Mashuk-KMV Pyatigorsk	11	(0)
2016	FC Belogorsk		
2017	CSKA Pamir Dushanbe	8	(0)

Managerial career
- 2023–: Eskhata Khujand
- * Club domestic league appearances and goals

Igor Aleksandrovich Surov (Russian: Игорь Александрович Суров; born 16 November 1985) is a former Russian footballer, and current head coach of Eskhata Khujand.

== Career ==
=== Club ===
He made his professional debut in 2007 for Moldovan National Division club FC Politehnica Chişinău.

In March 2017, Surov was registered by Tajik League side CSKA Pamir Dushanbe for their upcoming season, playing 8 league, and 2 cup games before leaving the club in July 2017, retiring back to Krasnodar to coach junior football.

=== Manager ===
On 31 March 2023, Surov was listed as the head coach of Eskhata Khujand.
