= Samuel Ofori (footballer, born 1999) =

Ghanaian footballer (born 1999)

Personal information
- Date of birth: 6 April 1999 (age 27)
- Place of birth: Accra, Ghana
- Height: 1.85 m (6 ft 1 in)
- Position: Centre-back

Team information
- Current team: Persijap Jepara
- Number: 15

Youth career
- –2021: The Dolphins

Senior career*
Years	Team	Apps	(Gls)
2022–2024	Ravshan Kulob	62	(2)
2025	Khosilot Farkhor	11	(0)
2025–2026	Kirivong Sok Sen Chey	27	(2)
2026–	Persijap Jepara	6	(0)

International career
2019	Ghana U20	1	(0)
- * Club domestic league appearances and goals as of 30 October 2026

Samuel Ofori (born 6 April 1999) is a Ghanaian professional footballer who plays as a centre-back for Super League club Persijap Jepara.

== Career ==
=== The Dolphins ===
Ofori started his career with The Dolphins from South Africa and in the winter in 2022. He was signed by Ravshan Kulob as a free agent.

=== Ravshan Kulob ===
Ofori made his official debut on 16 April as he helped his side defeat Regar-TadAZ Tursunzoda a goal to nil at the Talco Arena in Regar. Ofori played 20 games out of 22 for Ravshan Kulob during 2021/22, Ofori was named the best foreign player in the Vysshaya liga of Tajikistan at the end of the season. Ravshan Kulob became the runners-up to secure promotion to the AFC Cup. Ofori Also helped Ravshan Kulob to become two times silver medalists or Runners Up in the Vysshaya Liga in 2022 and 2023, respectively. Ofori also became Runners Up in the Tajikistan Cup

On 6 May, Ofori was featured in the Tajik Supercup alongside his fellow Ghanaian counterpart Joseph Akomadi. Ofori helped his side Ravshan Kulob to win the 2023 Tajik Supercup. Ravshan Kulob defeated their arch-rival Istiklol to clinch the title thanks to Ofori's defensive work at the back.

On 11 May 2024, Ofori and his club Ravshan Kulob lost the Tajik Supercup to their rivals Istiklol in the 2024 Final Edition which took place in Regar. Ofori got silver medalist attached to his achievements.

On 21 September 2023, Ofori made his AFC Cup debut against Merw from Turkmenistan. Ofori's Ravshan Kulob were in the same group E with FC Abdysh-Ata Kant from Kyrgyzstan and Altyn Asyr from Turkmenistan. Ofori played in all six games of the group stages.

On 18 September 2024, Ofori made his AFC Champions League Two debut against India giants Mohun Bagan Super Giant in Kolkata, India. Ofori's Ravshan Kulob were in the same group A with Al-Wakrah SC from Qatar And Tractor S.C. from Iran. Ofori have played all group stage games.

=== Innoprom Cup Russia ===
The INNOPROM Cup is an international football tournament held in Yekaterinburg, Russia, alongside the INNOPROM International Industrial Trade Fair. The 2024 edition was held in conjunction with the main INNOPROM event, which took place from July 8–11. The tournament saw participation from teams like FC Ural, FK IMT Belgrade, Ravshan Kulob and Qizilqum.

Ofori and his team Ravshan Kulob were known as the bronze medalists after defeating IMT Belgrade were Ofori open up the scoring in the 10th minutes of the game. Thanks to Ofori header goal which boosted the confidence of his teammates to overcome the European Giants.

=== Zimbru Chișinău ===
On 9 January 2025, Ravshan Kulob announced that Ofori had left the club after his contract had expired, and signed for Moldovan Super Liga club Zimbru Chișinău.

=== Khosilot Farkhor ===
On 3 February 2025, Tajikistan Higher League club Khosilot Farkhor announced the signing of Ofori to a one-year contract, after an agreement with Zimbru Chișinău fell through.

On 10 July 2025, Khosilot Farkhor announced the departure of Ofori.

=== Kirivong Sok Sen Chey ===
Ofori has officially joined Cambodian Premier League side Kirivong Sok Sen Chey till the end of the season in the summer of 2026.

== Career statistics ==
As of match played 13 August 2023

Appearances and goals by club, season and competition
Club	Season	League			National Cup		League Cup		Continental		Other		Total	
Club	Season	Division	Apps	Goals	Apps	Goals	Apps	Goals	Apps	Goals	Apps	Goals	Apps	Goals
Ravshan Kulob	2022	Tajikistan Higher League	20	0	0	0	–						20	0
Ravshan Kulob	2023	Tajikistan Higher League	20	1	1	0	–		6	0	1 (Note: Appearances in the Tajik Supercup)	0	28	1
Ravshan Kulob	2024	Tajikistan Higher League	22	1	1	0	-		2	0	0	0	19	1
Ravshan Kulob	Total		76	0	2	0	-	-	8	0	0	0	67	2
Career total			76	0	2	0	-	-	8	0	0	0	67	2

== Honours ==
Ravshan Kulob

- Tajik Supercup
