= FK Fayzkand =

Fayzkand Hulbuk
- Full name: Football Club Fayzkand Hulbuk
- Manager: Jaloliddin Majidov
- League: Tajikistan Higher League
- 2023: Tajikistan Higher League, 5th of 10
Home colours	Away colours

FK Fayzkand Hulbuk (Tajik: Клуби футболи Файзанд) is a professional football club based in Hulbuk, Tajikistan.

== History ==
FK Fayzkand earned promotion to the Tajikistan Higher League for the first time after finishing second in the 2019 Tajikistan First League. On 24 March 2020, FK Fayzkand announced Tokhirjon Muminov as their new manager.

=== Domestic history ===
Season	League									Tajik Cup	Top goalscorer		Manager
Season	Div.	Pos.	Pl.	W	D	L	GS	GA	P	Tajik Cup	Name	League	Manager
2019	2nd	2nd	26	18	6	2	65	22	60	Semifinal	(Tajikistan) Mukhsin Maduloev	14	
2020	1st	7th	18	4	7	7	17	31	19	Last 16	(Tajikistan) Anvar Murodov (Tajikistan) Sharafdzhon Solehov	3	(Tajikistan) Tokhirjon Muminov
2021	1st	8th	27	8	5	14	20	37	29	Quarterfinal	(Tajikistan) Abdukhalil Boronov	9	(Tajikistan) Tokhirjon Muminov
2022	1st	6th	22	8	4	10	25	34	28	?	(Tajikistan) Shavkati Hotam	9	(Iran) Masoud Nazarzadeh

== Squad (2023) ==
Note: Flags indicate national team as defined under FIFA eligibility rules; some limited exceptions apply. Players may hold more than one non-FIFA nationality.

No.	Pos.	Nation	Player
—	GK	GHA	Gbeku Prosper
—	GK	TJK	Ibrokhim Ismoilov
—	GK	TJK	Doniyor Sadriddinov
—	DF	CMR	Nnaga Akhanda
—	DF	CMR	Bill Obama Arsen
—	DF	CMR	Arthur Bougnon
—	DF	TJK	Abdukholik Alimov
—	DF	TJK	Khuvaidoi Gulmurod
—	DF	TJK	Mahmud Pirov
—	DF	TJK	Bilol Sulaymonov
—	DF	UZB	Zufarjon Akbaraliev
—	MF	CMR	Joseph Feumba

No.	Pos.	Nation	Player
—	MF	CMR	Junior Onana
—	MF	TJK	Mukhsinjon Abugafforov
—	MF	TJK	Khamzajon Akhtamov
—	MF	TJK	Ismoil Alimardonov
—	MF	TJK	Boburmirzo Barotov
—	MF	TJK	Mustafo Milikshoev
—	MF	TJK	Jamshed Murodov
—	MF	TJK	Anushervon Navruzov
—	MF	TJK	Mahmudjon Shafiev
—	MF	TJK	Khodjiakbar Uzokov
—	FW	TJK	Shavkati Hotam
—	FW	TJK	Avaz Kamchinov
