= Tokhirjon Muminov =

Tajikistani footballer

Personal information
- Full name: Tokhirjon Rahmatjonovich Muminov
- Date of birth: 6 August 1970 (age 56)
- Place of birth: Tajik SSR, Soviet Union
- Height: 1.76 m (5 ft 9 1/2 in)
- Position: Midfielder

Senior career*
Years	Team	Apps	(Gls)
1990–1991	Vakhsh Qurghonteppa	51	(3)
1992	FC Sohibkor (Dushanbe)		
1993–1995	CSKA Pamir Dushanbe		
1996–2002	Andijan	185	(33)
2003	FC Farrukh Hisor (player-manager)		
2004	FC Khujand (Khujand)		
2005	Regar-TadAZ		

International career^{‡}
1993–2003	Tajikistan	31	(11)

Managerial career
- 2005–2007: Energetik Dushanbe
- 2008: Vakhsh Qurghonteppa
- 2010–2012: Khayr Vahdat
- 2013: Energetik Dushanbe
- 2014: Vakhsh Qurghonteppa
- 2014: Khayr Vahdat
- 2015: Ravshan Kulob
- 2016–2018: CSKA Pamir Dushanbe
- 2019: Istaravshan
- 2020–2021: Fayzkand
- * Club domestic league appearances and goals as of 21 July 2016 ‡ National team caps and goals as of 21 July 2016

Tokhirjon Muminov (Tajik: Тоҳирҷон Муъминов; born 6 August 1970) is a retired Tajikistani footballer, and current manager of Fayzkand.

== Career ==
=== Managerial career ===
On 10 August 2012, Muminov ended his first stint as Khayr Vahdat manager. On 31 October 2014, Muminov returned to Khayr Vahdat as manager.

In July 2016, Muminov replaced Rahmatullo Fuzailov as manager of CSKA Pamir Dushanbe.

On 14 March 2019, Muminov was appointed as manager of FK Istaravshan.

On 24 March 2020, Muminov was appointed as manager of FK Fayzkand.

== Career statistics ==
=== International ===
Tajikistan
Year	Apps	Goals
1993	4	1
1997	7	3
1998	3	3
1999	3	3
2000	2	1
2003	8	0
Total	27	11

Statistics accurate as of 11 September 2015.

Scores and results list Tajikistan's goal tally first, score column indicates score after each Muminov goal.

List of international goals scored by Tokhirjon Muminov
No.	Date	Venue	Opponent	Score	Result	Competition
1	8 June 1993	Azadi Stadium, Tehran, Iran	Kyrgyzstan	1–1	1–1	1993 ECO Cup
2	4 May 1997	Central Republican Stadium, Dushanbe, Tajikistan	Vietnam	2–0	4–0	1998 FIFA World Cup qualification
3	1 June 1997	Thống Nhất Stadium, Ho Chi Minh City, Vietnam	Vietnam	1–0	4–0	1998 FIFA World Cup qualification
4	22 June 1997	Pamir Stadium, Dushanbe, Tajikistan	Turkmenistan	5–0	5–0	1998 FIFA World Cup qualification
5	1 December 1997	Suphan Buri Provincial Stadium, Suphan Buri, Thailand	Maldives	1–0	3–0	1998 Asian Games
6	12 December 1998	Suphachalasai Stadium, Bangkok, Thailand	Oman	2–0	3–3	1998 Asian Games
7	12 December 1998	Suphachalasai Stadium, Bangkok, Thailand	Oman	3–2	3–3	1998 Asian Games
8	3 August 1999	Central Republican Stadium, Dushanbe, Iraq	Iraq	1–1	2–2	2000 AFC Asian Cup qualification
9	5 August 1999	Central Republican Stadium, Dushanbe, Tajikistan	Kyrgyzstan	1–0	3–2	2000 AFC Asian Cup qualification
10	5 August 1999	Central Republican Stadium, Dushanbe, Tajikistan	Kyrgyzstan	2–0	3–2	2000 AFC Asian Cup qualification
11	26 November 2000	Takhti Stadium, Tabriz, Iran	Guam	2–0	16–0	2002 FIFA World Cup qualification
