= Yevhen Hrytsenko =

Ukrainian footballer

Personal information
- Full name: Yevhen Oleksandrovych Hrytsenko
- Date of birth: 5 February 1995 (age 31)
- Place of birth: Donetsk, Ukraine
- Height: 1.89 m (6 ft 2 1/2 in)
- Position: Goalkeeper

Team information
- Current team: Uzgen
- Number: 55

Youth career
- 2007–2012: Shakhtar Donetsk

Senior career*
Years	Team	Apps	(Gls)
2012–2022	Shakhtar Donetsk	0	(0)
2012–2014	→ Shakhtar-3 Donetsk	23	(0)
2018–2019	→ Mariupol (loan)	0	(0)
2022–2023	Van	2	(0)
2023–2025	Ravshan Kulob	63	(0)
2026–	Uzgen	0	(0)

International career^{‡}
2015	Ukraine-21	3	(0)
- * Club domestic league appearances and goals as of 26 February 2026 ‡ National team caps and goals as of 3 September 2021

Yevhen Hrytsenko (Ukrainian: Євген Олександрович Гриценко, born 5 February 1995) is a Ukrainian professional footballer who plays as a goalkeeper for Uzgen.

== Career ==
Hrytsenko is a product of the Shakhtar Donetsk youth system, signing a professional contract with the team in 2012.

He played in the Ukrainian Second League for FC Shakhtar-3 Donetsk and then in the Ukrainian Premier League Reserves and never made his debut for Shakhtar Donetsk in the Ukrainian Premier League. In June 2017, it was announced that he would go on loan to FC Mariupol, but one week later he returned to FC Shakhtar reserves. On 28 June 2018 he finally completed a one-year loan move to FC Mariupol.

On 7 November 2022, Van announced the signing of Hrytsenko. On 9 February 2023, Hrytsenko left Van by mutual consent.

On 5 March 2024, Ravshan Kulob announced that they had extended their contract with Hrytsenko until the end of the 2025 season.

On 19 February 2026, Uzgen announced the signing of Hrytsenko.

== Honours ==
Ravshan Kulob

- Tajik Supercup: 2023
