= Joseph Akomadi =

Ghanaian footballer (born 1999)

Personal information
- Date of birth: 23 September 1999 (age 27)
- Place of birth: Accra, Ghana
- Height: 1.80 m (5 ft 11 in)
- Position: Forward

Team information
- Current team: Khosilot Farkhor
- Number: 10

Youth career
- 2011–2015: Keliz FC
- 2015–2016: Aspire Academy
- 2016–2018: SportsLife FC
- 2018–2020: Hatayspor

Senior career*
| Years | Team | Apps | (Gls) |
| 2018–2021 | Hatayspor | 4 | (0) |
| 2023 | Ravshan Kulob | 22 | (4) |
| 2024 | Al-Naft | | |
| 2025– | Khosilot Farkhor | 22 | (7) |
- * Club domestic league appearances and goals as of 16 March 2026

Joseph Akomadi (born 23 September 1999) is a Ghanaian professional footballer who plays as a forward for Khosilot Farkhor.

== Club career ==
Akomadi started his career with Ghanaian side Keliz FC where he spent four seasons before moving to Aspire Academy in the summer of 2015. He signed a four-year-contract with Hatayspor which will run until the summer of 2023 from SportsLife FC. Akomadi won his first major silverware by winning the 2019–20 TFF First League title with Hatayspor and securing promotion to the Süper Lig. He was promoted to the Hatayspor first team from the U21 side and made his debut for Hatayspor in the last game of the season as he came off the bench to play in their 3–1 win over Bursaspor. He amassed a total of 25 appearances for the U21 side in the 2018–19 season and scored two goals. He has officially scored three goals for Hatayspor in U19 and U21 games since he joined the club and has played a total of 30 appearances for the club in all ranks.

On 25 January 2025, Khosilot Farkhor announced the signing of Akomadi to a one-year contract.

== Statistics ==
Performance Sheet
| Year | Club | Apps | Goals |
|---|---|---|---|
| 2013 | Keliz FC | - | - |
| 2015 | Aspire Academy | - | 18 |
| 2016 | SportsLife FC | - | - |
| 2018/19 | Hatayspor U19 | 2 | 1 |
| 2019/20 | Hatayspor U21 | 25 | 2 |
| 2018 | Hatayspor | 1 | 0 |
| 2019/20 | Hatayspor | 1 | 0 |

== Honours ==
Ravshan Kulob

- Tajik Supercup: 2023
