= 2024 Tajikistan Higher League =

Tajikistan Higher League
- Season: 2024
- Dates: 6 April 2024-11 December 2024
- Champions: Istiklol
- Relegated: Kuktosh Rudaki
- AFC Champions League Two: Istiklol; Regar-TadAZ
- Matches: 130
- Goals: 332 (2.55 per match)
- Top goalscorer: Manuchekhr Dzhalilov (17)
- Biggest home win: Istiklol 9–1 Barkchi (19 June 2024)
- Biggest away win: Eskhata 0–3 CSKA Pamir (13 April 2024); Kuktosh 0–3 CSKA Pamir (12 May 2024); Kuktosh 0–3 Khujand (21 June 2024); Panjshir 0–3 Istiklol (26 June 2024)
- Highest scoring: Istiklol 9–1 Barkchi (19 June 2024)
- Longest winning run: 14 matches Istiklol
- Longest unbeaten run: 14 matches Istiklol
- Longest winless run: 18 matches Kuktosh Rudaki
- Longest losing run: 9 matches Barkchi
- Highest attendance: 18,300 - Istaravshan vs FK Khujand (1 June 2024)
- Lowest attendance: 100 - Barkchi vs Vakhsh Bokhtar (20 April 2024)
- Total attendance: 220,270
- Average attendance: 2,861 (11 August 2024)
- All statistics correct as of 11 December 2024.

The 2024 Tajikistan Higher League (Tajik: 2024 Лигаи Олии Тоҷикистон, Russian: 2024 Высшая Лига Таджикистана), also known as 1xBet Higher League due to sponsorship reasons, was the 33rd season of the Tajikistan Higher League, Tajikistan's top division of association football.

== Season events ==
On 5 March 2024, the Tajikistan Football Federation announced that the season would commence on 6 April. It was also announced that the league would consist of 12 teams, with each team playing each other twice over the course of the season. At the end of the season the bottom club will be relegated to the Tajikistan First League, whilst the 11th placed team will play a playoff game with the team that finishes second in the Tajikistan First League.

On 22 May 2024, Istiklol's matches against Barkchi on 26 May and Panjshir on 1 June were postponed due to International call ups.

== Teams ==
On 5 March, the Tajikistan Football Federation confirmed that 12 teams would take part in the 2024 season, 9 from the 2023 season and Istaravshan (promoted after a single year absence from top flight), Panjsher Balkh (promoted after a three-year absence from top flight) and Barkchi Hisor (promoted after a four-year absence from top flight) as the teams promoted from 2023 Tajikistan First League.

Locations of teams in the 2023 Tajikistan Higher League

| Team | Location | Venue | Capacity |
|---|---|---|---|
| Barkchi | Hisor | Ibrogimbek Gaforov Stadium | 3,000 |
| CSKA Pamir | Dushanbe | CSKA Stadium | 7,000 |
| Eskhata | Khujand | Bistsolagii Istiqloliyati Stadium | 20,000 |
| Istaravshan | Istaravshan | Istaravshan-Arena | 20,000 |
| Istiklol | Dushanbe | Central Republican Stadium | 24,000 |
| Hosilot Farkhor | Farkhor | Central Stadium | |
| Khujand | Khujand | Bistsolagii Istiqloliyati Stadium | 20,000 |
| Kuktosh Rudaki | Chorgulteppa | Rudaki Stadium | |
| Panjsher | Balkh | Panjsher Stadium | 8,500 |
| Ravshan | Kulob | Central Stadium | |
| Regar-TadAZ | Tursunzoda | TALCO Arena | 10,000 |
| Vakhsh Bokhtar | Bokhtar | Tsentralnyi Stadium | 10,000 |

=== Personnel and sponsoring ===
| Team | Manager | Captain | Kit manufacturer | Sponsor |
|---|---|---|---|---|
| Barkchi | (Tajikistan) Rustam Zafarzoda | | | |
| CSKA Pamir | (Tajikistan) Khakim Fuzailov | | Joma | Formula 55 |
| Eskhata | (Russia) Igor Surov | | Joma | Bank Eskhata |
| Istaravshan | (Tajikistan) Yahyo Azizboev | | | |
| Istiklol | (Tajikistan) Igor Cherevchenko | (Tajikistan) Alisher Dzhalilov | Joma | Siyoma |
| Hosilot Farkhor | (Tajikistan) Alisher Tukhtaev | | | |
| Khujand | (Tajikistan) Davron Abdulloev | | Joma | Formula 55 |
| Kuktosh Rudaki | (Tajikistan) Alisher Ahmadzoda | | | |
| Panjsher | (Tajikistan) Amir Farhodboev | | | |
| Ravshan Kulob | (Iran) Ali Nazarzadeh | | Joma | Hoji Sharif |
| Regar-TadAZ | (Tajikistan) Zayniddin Rahimov | | Joma | TALCO |
| Vakhsh Bokhtar | (Tajikistan) Nuriddin Sardorboev | (Tajikistan) Islom Eldorov | | |

=== Foreign players ===
During the 2024 season, Tajikistan Higher League are able to register seven foreign players, with all seven being able to be on the pitch at the same time.

| Club | Player 1 | Player 2 | Player 3 | Player 4 | Player 5 | Player 6 | Player 7 | Player 8 | Player 9 | Former Players |
|---|---|---|---|---|---|---|---|---|---|---|
| Barkchi | (Cameroon) Étienne Landry Onana | (Ghana) Patrick Arthur | (Ghana) Boateng Frimpong | (Ghana) Kuaye Godson | (Ghana) Kamal Mohammed | (Thailand) Chinbunchorn Somrak | | | | |
| CSKA Pamir | (Cameroon) Gerard Bakinde | (Cameroon) Jean Gatten | (Ghana) Anani Kwasi | (Uzbekistan) Shokhrukh Eshbutaev | (Uzbekistan) Mukhammad Isaev | (Uzbekistan) Islom Isakzhanov | (Uzbekistan) Mukhiddin Odilov | | | (Uzbekistan) Saidmakhmud Gulomov |
| Eskhata | (Moldova) Dmitri Stajila | (Uzbekistan) Azizbek Muratov | (Uzbekistan) Sanzhar Rikhsiboev | | | | | | | |
| Istaravshan | (Serbia) Nikola Jovanovic | (Uzbekistan) Jakhongir Akhmadov | (Uzbekistan) Azamat Isroilov | (Uzbekistan) Jamshid Khasanov | (Uzbekistan) Mumin Meliev | (Uzbekistan) Mirzokhid Mirzamakhmudov | (Uzbekistan) Javokhirbek Rasulov | | | (Cameroon) Mbeke Siebatcheu (Uzbekistan) Khurshid Olimov |
| Istiklol | (Australia) Matthew Millar | (Belarus) Pavel Nazarenko | (Brazil) Murilo Souza | (Bulgaria) Dimitar Mitkov | (Italy) Francesco Margiotta | (Japan) Keita Suzuki | (North Macedonia) Darko Ilieski | (Serbia) Nikola Stošić | (Ukraine) Oleksiy Larin | (Bosnia and Herzegovina) Dženis Beganović (Croatia) Ivan Novoselec (Nigeria) Blessing Eleke (Serbia) Slavko Lukić |
| Hosilot Farkhor | (Cameroon) Willy Kapawa | (Cameroon) Arsene Bilé Obama | (Cameroon) Junior Prince Sime | (Georgia (country)) Giorgi Gadrani | (Georgia (country)) Luka Koberidze | (Ghana) Prosper Gbeku | | | | (Cameroon) Francois Enyegue (Ghana) Aryeetey Roger |
| Khujand | (Cameroon) Tony Bikatal | (Russia) Artyom Serdyuk | (Russia) Sergei Tskanyan | (Serbia) Dejan Tumbas | (Uzbekistan) Firdavs Abdusalimov | (Uzbekistan) Jasur Kurbonov | (Uzbekistan) Islom Toshpulatov | | | (Russia) Deni Daliev |
| Kuktosh Rudaki | (Ghana) Alex Gyamfi | (Ghana) Aryeetey Roger | (Mali) Mohamed Tangara | (Philippines) Aaron Vasquez | (Uzbekistan) Jakhongir Alamov | (Uzbekistan) Khasanboy Kakhkhorov | | | | (Ghana) Kuaye Godson (Ghana) Kamal Mohammed (Iran) Mahdi Nourpourasl (Iran) Sam Azimzadeh Tabrizi (Uzbekistan) Ural Choriev (Uzbekistan) Muslim Kurbonov |
| Panjsher | (Cameroon) Ngangue Ntengue Dorian | (Cameroon) Fon Terence Musi | (Cameroon) Alexandre Ngongang | (Cameroon) Andre Nkou | (France) Wilfried Tchamako | (Ghana) Christopher Bonney | (Ghana) Peter Sarkodie | (Iran) Radin Sayyar | | (Cameroon) Franck Michael Nonga (Ghana) Junior Onana |
| Ravshan Kulob | (Bosnia and Herzegovina) Kojo Matić | (Ghana) Siddiq Kamal Issah | (Ghana) David Mawutor | (Ghana) Samuel Ofori | (Serbia) Kristian Mocic | (Ukraine) Andriy Markovych | (Ukraine) Yevhen Hrytsenko | | | (Brazil) Matheus Silva (Ghana) **Masahudu Alhassan** (Moldova) Evgheni Oancea (Turkmenistan) Musa Nurnazarov (Ukraine) Yuriy Batyushyn (Ukraine) Dmytriy Pavlish |
| Regar-TadAZ | (Cameroon) Joseph Feumba | (Cameroon) Manuel Tresor Panny | (Ghana) Nii Gyashie Bortey Acquaye | (Ghana) Emmanuel Kwadwo Frimpong | (Ghana) Osuman Kassim | (Ghana) Johnson Owusu | (Uzbekistan) Asilbek Temirov | | | (Uzbekistan) Ramis Begishev |
| Vakhsh Bokhtar | (Ghana) Benjamin Amponsah | (Tanzania) Emmanuel Mwanengo | (Ukraine) Mykyta Peterman | (Ukraine) Serhiy Yavorskyi | (Uzbekistan) Sardor Kobulzhanov | | | | | (Iran) Reza Seyf Ahmadi |

In bold: Players that have been capped for their national team.

=== Managerial changes ===
| Team | Outgoing manager | Manner of departure | Date of vacancy | Position in table | Incoming manager | Date of appointment |
|---|---|---|---|---|---|---|
| Ravshan Kulob | (Tajikistan) Tokhirjon Muminov | Contract Expired | 8 January 2024 | Preseason | (Tajikistan) Ahliddin Turdiev | 11 January 2024 |
| Istiklol | (Tajikistan) Igor Cherevchenko | Contract Expired | 11 February 2024 | Preseason | (Serbia) Nikola Lazarević | 15 March 2024 |
| Hosilot Farkhor | | | | Preseason | (Tajikistan) Alisher Tukhtaev | |
| Ravshan Kulob | (Tajikistan) Ahliddin Turdiev | Resigned | 18 May 2024 | 4th | (Iran) Ali Nazarzadeh (Caretaker) | 18 May 2024 |
| Istiklol | (Serbia) Nikola Lazarević | | 15 September 2024 | 1st | (Tajikistan) Alisher Tukhtaev (Interim) | 15 September 2024 |
| Istiklol | (Tajikistan) Alisher Tukhtaev (Interim) | End of role | 4 October 2024 | 1st | (Tajikistan) Igor Cherevchenko | 4 October 2024 |

== Regular season ==
=== League table ===
| Pos | Team | Pld | W | D | L | GF | GA | GD | Pts | Qualification or relegation |
|---|---|---|---|---|---|---|---|---|---|---|
| 1 | Istiklol (C) | 22 | 19 | 2 | 1 | 59 | 11 | +48 | 59 | Qualification for AFC Champions League Two |
| 2 | Khujand | 22 | 13 | 4 | 5 | 38 | 16 | +22 | 43 | |
| 3 | Ravshan Kulob | 22 | 11 | 8 | 3 | 33 | 17 | +16 | 41 | |
| 4 | CSKA Pamir | 22 | 11 | 6 | 5 | 36 | 21 | +15 | 39 | |
| 5 | Vakhsh Bokhtar | 22 | 11 | 2 | 9 | 26 | 21 | +5 | 35 | |
| 6 | Eskhata | 22 | 10 | 5 | 7 | 34 | 31 | +3 | 35 | |
| 7 | Regar-TadAZ | 22 | 9 | 6 | 7 | 21 | 15 | +6 | 33 | Qualification for AFC Champions League Two Qualifying play-off (Note: Regar-TadAZ qualified for the AFC Champions League Two Qualifying play-off round by winning the 2024 Tajikistan Cup.) |
| 8 | Hosilot Farkhor | 22 | 5 | 9 | 8 | 27 | 26 | +1 | 24 | |
| 9 | Barkchi | 22 | 5 | 5 | 12 | 21 | 42 | −21 | 20 | |
| 10 | Istaravshan | 22 | 4 | 5 | 13 | 17 | 32 | −15 | 17 | |
| 11 | Panjshir | 22 | 4 | 4 | 14 | 16 | 41 | −25 | 16 | Qualification to relegation play-offs |
| 12 | Kuktosh Rudaki (R) | 22 | 1 | 2 | 19 | 8 | 63 | −55 | 5 | Relegation to Tajik First Division |

Source: Soccerway
Rules for classification: 1) Points; 2) Head-to-head points; 3) Head-to-head goal difference; 4) Head-to-head goals scored; 5) Goal difference; 6) Goals scored.
(C) Champions; (R) Relegated

=== Results ===
| Home \ Away | BAR | CPD | ESK | ISA | IST | KHF | KJD | KUK | PAN | RAV | REG | VAK |
|---|---|---|---|---|---|---|---|---|---|---|---|---|
| Barkchi | | 0–2 | 0–1 | 1–0 | 1–5 | 1–1 | 0–1 | 1–0 | 1–3 | 3–3 | 1–2 | 1–0 |
| CSKA Pamir | 3–2 | | 0–0 | 4–1 | 1–2 | 5–0 | 0–0 | 5–0 | 0–0 | 0–0 | 3–1 | 1–0 |
| Eskhata | 2–2 | 0–3 | | 2–2 | 0–3 | 3–1 | 0–2 | 7–0 | 3–1 | 1–1 | 1–0 | 1–0 |
| Istaravshan | 1–1 | 0–1 | 0–1 | | 0–2 | 0–0 | 1–1 | 2–0 | 0–0 | 1–3 | 0–1 | 2–1 |
| Istiklol | 9–1 | 2–0 | 6–1 | 3–1 | | 3–1 | 0–1 | 6–0 | 4–0 | 1–0 | 0–0 | 3–0 |
| Hosilot Farkhor | 3–0 | 1–1 | 1–2 | 3–1 | 3–3 | | 0–1 | 2–0 | 4–1 | 0–1 | 0–1 | 1–2 |
| Khujand | 2–0 | 5–1 | 2–1 | 3–1 | 0–1 | 1–3 | | 6–0 | 3–1 | 1–1 | 1–2 | 2–0 |
| Kuktosh Rudaki | 2–1 | 0–3 | 2–3 | 0–1 | 0–2 | 0–0 | 0–3 | | 2–4 | 0–5 | 0–0 | 0–1 |
| Panjshir | 0–2 | 1–3 | 0–2 | 1–3 | 0–3 | 0–0 | 0–1 | 2–1 | | 1–1 | 1–0 | 0–4 |
| Ravshan Kulob | 2–1 | 1–0 | 4–1 | 1–0 | 0–1 | 0–0 | 3–2 | 3–0 | 2–0 | | 1–1 | 0–0 |
| Regar-TadAZ | 0–0 | 2–3 | 2–0 | 2–0 | 1–2 | 0–0 | 0–0 | 3–0 | 1–0 | 0–1 | | 2–0 |
| Vakhsh Bokhtar | 0–1 | 2–1 | 2–2 | 1–0 | 0–1 | 4–2 | 1–0 | 3–1 | 1–0 | 3–0 | 1–0 | |

Updated to match(es) played on 11 December 2024. Source: Soccerway
Legend: Blue = home team win; Yellow = draw; Red = away team win.

=== Results by round ===
| Team ╲ Round | 1 | 2 | 3 | 4 | 5 | 6 | 7 | 8 | 9 | 10 | 11 | 12 | 13 | 14 | 15 | 16 | 17 | 18 | 19 | 20 | 21 | 22 |
|---|---|---|---|---|---|---|---|---|---|---|---|---|---|---|---|---|---|---|---|---|---|---|
| Barkchi | D | D | W | L | L | L | L | L | L | L | L | L | W | W | W | L | D | D | L | D | W | L |
| CSKA Pamir | W | W | D | W | W | W | D | D | W | L | W | D | D | L | W | L | W | L | D | W | L | W |
| Eskhata | L | L | W | D | L | D | L | W | W | W | W | L | D | W | L | W | W | L | D | D | W | W |
| Istaravshan | L | D | W | L | L | D | W | W | D | L | L | L | L | D | L | L | L | L | W | L | D | L |
| Istiklol | W | W | W | W | W | W | W | W | W | W | W | W | W | W | L | D | D | W | W | W | W | W |
| Hosilot Farkhor | W | W | L | L | L | W | D | D | D | W | L | D | L | L | D | D | D | W | D | L | D | L |
| Khujand | W | L | D | L | W | W | D | D | D | W | W | W | W | L | W | W | W | W | L | W | L | W |
| Kuktosh Rudaki | L | D | L | W | L | L | L | L | L | L | L | D | L | L | L | L | L | L | L | L | L | L |
| Panjshir | L | L | L | L | W | L | D | L | L | W | L | D | D | D | L | W | L | L | W | L | L | L |
| Ravshan Kulob | D | W | D | D | W | L | W | D | D | W | L | W | D | W | D | W | D | W | W | W | D | L |
| Regar-TadAZ | W | D | D | W | W | L | W | W | L | L | W | L | W | W | W | L | D | D | L | L | D | W |
| Vakhsh Bokhtar | L | L | L | W | L | W | L | L | W | L | W | W | L | L | W | W | D | W | D | W | W | W |

Updated to match(es) played on 8 December 2024. Source:
W = Win; D = Draw; L = Loss; P = Postponed

== Relegation play-off ==
The kick-off times were announced on 1 December 2024.

=== First leg ===
3 December 2024
14:00 (UTC+5)

| Parvoz Bobojon Ghafurov | 1–1 | Panjshir |
|---|---|---|
| Rustamzoda 64' | Report | Saydaminov 6' |

Furudgokh Stadium, Buston

=== Second leg ===
7 December 2024
13:30 (UTC+5)

| Panjshir | 2–0 | Parvoz Bobojon Ghafurov |
|---|---|---|
| Bonney 83'; Saydaminov 86' | Report |

Panjsher Uktam Mamatova, Balkh

== Season statistics ==
=== Scoring ===
- First goal of the season: Bakhtiyor Zaripov for Ravshan Kulob against Barkchi. (6 April 2024)

=== Top scorers ===
As of matches played 11 December 2024

| Rank | Player | Club | Goals |
|---|---|---|---|
| 1 | (Tajikistan) Manuchekhr Dzhalilov | Istiklol | 17 |
| 2 | (Tajikistan) Jahongir Ergashev | Eskhata Khujand | 10 |
| 2 | (Russia) Artyom Serdyuk | Khujand | 10 |
| 4 | (Serbia) Dejan Tumbas | Khujand | 8 |
| 4 | (Tajikistan) Nozim Babadjanov | Khujand/Ravshan | 8 |
| 4 | (Tajikistan) Abdukhalil Boronov | CSKA Pamir Dushanbe | 8 |
| 4 | (Tajikistan) Sheriddin Boboev | Hosilot Farkhor | 8 |

Own goals:

- (Ghana) Christopher Bonney – for Istaravshan vs Panjshir 19 April 2024
- (Tajikistan) Abbos Andalibov – for CSKA Pamir vs Kuktosh Rudaki 12 May 2024
- (Tajikistan) Khusein Nurmatov – for CSKA Pamir vs Hosilot Farkhor 26 May 2024
- (Ghana) Christopher Bonney – for Istiklol vs Panjshir 26 June 2024

=== Hat-tricks ===
| Player | For | Against | Result | Date | Ref |
|---|---|---|---|---|---|
| (Nigeria) Blessing Eleke | Istiklol | Kuktosh Rudaki | 6–0 (H) | 20 April 2024 | |
| (Tajikistan) Jahongir Ergashev | Eskhata Khujand | Kuktosh Rudaki | 7–0 (H) | 16 June 2024 | |
| (Tajikistan) Manuchekhr Dzhalilov ^{4} | Istiklol | Barkchi | 9–1 (H) | 19 June 2024 | |
| (Tajikistan) Manuchekhr Dzhalilov | Istiklol | Barkchi | 5–1 (A) | 30 November 2024 | |

- ^{4} Player scored 4 goals

=== Clean sheets ===
As of matches played 30 June 2024

| Rank | Player | Club | Clean sheets |
|---|---|---|---|
| 1 | (Tajikistan) Ibrokhim Ismoilov | Regar-TadAZ | 7 |
| 1 | (Tajikistan) Shokhrukh Ishbutaev | CSKA Pamir | 7 |
| 3 | (Ukraine) Yevhen Hrytsenko | Ravshan Kulob | 6 |
| 4 | (Tajikistan) Safarmad Gafforov | Khujand | 5 |
| 5 | (Tajikistan) Rustam Yatimov | Istiklol | 3 |
| 5 | (Moldova) Dmitri Stajila | Eskhata Khujand | 3 |
| 5 | (Tajikistan) Mukhriddin Khasanov | Istiklol | 3 |
| 5 | (Tajikistan) Daler Azizov | Hosilot Farkhor | 3 |
| 9 | (Iran) Seifahmadi Reza Jafar | Vakhsh Bokhtar | 2 |
| 9 | (Ghana) Prosper Gbeku | Hosilot Farkhor | 2 |
| 9 | (Ghana) Kuaye Godson | Kuktosh Rudaki | 2 |
| 9 | (Ghana) Peter Sarkodie | Panjshir | 2 |
| 13 | (Tajikistan) Dilshod Dodoboev | Khujand | 1 |
| 13 | (Tajikistan) Shakhobiddin Mahmuzoda | Barkchi | 1 |
| 13 | (Tajikistan) Muhammadrabi Rakhmatulloev | Ravshan Kulob | 1 |
| 13 | (Tajikistan) Mumindzhon Gadyboev | Eskhata Khujand | 1 |
| 13 | (Tajikistan) Bekhzod Khakimov | Istaravshan | 1 |
| 13 | (Tajikistan) Sardor Kabuldzhanov | Vakhsh Bokhtar | 1 |

=== Discipline ===
==== Red cards ====
As of match played 11 August 2024

- (Uzbekistan) Firdavs Abdusalimov - Khujand vs Eskhata Khujand (6 April 2024)
- (Tajikistan) Oybek Abdugafforov - Khujand vs Eskhata Khujand (6 April 2024)
- (Moldova) Evgheni Oancea - CSKA Pamir vs Ravshan Kulob (20 April 2024)
- (Tajikistan) Muhammad Salomzoda - Kuktosh Rudaki vs Barkchi (26 April 2024)
- (Tajikistan) Firdavs Chakalov - Eskhata Khujand vs Ravshan Kulob (27 April 2024)
- (Cameroon) Joseph Feumba - Regar-TadAZ vs Istiklol (15 May 2024)
- (Tajikistan) Rustam Soirov - Regar-TadAZ vs Istiklol (15 May 2024)
- (Tajikistan) Khurshed-Timur Dzhuraev - Barkchi vs Regar-TadAZ (18 May 2024)
- (Tajikistan) Abdurakhmon Uzokov - Istiklol vs Eskhata Khujand (19 May 2024)
- (Uzbekistan) Firdavs Abdusalimov - Khujand vs Ravshan Kulob (25 May 2024)
- (Tajikistan) Saidkhoni Amrokhon - Khujand vs Ravshan Kulob (25 May 2024)
- (Cameroon) Jean Gaten - CSKA Pamir vs Regar-TadAZ (1 June 2024)
- (Uzbekistan) Javokhirbek Rasulov - Istaravshan vs Khujand (1 June 2024)
- (Tajikistan) Bakhtovar Gayurov - Barkchi vs Panjshir (15 June 2024)
- (Tajikistan) Muhammadjon Naskov - Regar-TadAZ vs Ravshan Kulob (16 June 2024)
- (Tajikistan) Dzhonibek Sharipov - CSKA Pamir vs Istiklol (23 June 2024)
- (Tajikistan) Romish Jalilov - Vakhsh Bokhtar vs Istiklol (23 June 2024)
- (Tajikistan) Mukhammadzhon Rakhimov - Ravshan Kulob vs Eskhata Khujand (23 June 2024)
- (Tajikistan) Amirbek Juraboev - Ravshan Kulob vs Eskhata Khujand (23 June 2024)
- (Ghana) Osuman Kassim - Vakhsh Bokhtar vs Regar-TadAZ (28 June 2024)
- (Cameroon) Tony Bikatal - Eskhata Khujand vs Khujand (29 June 2024)

=== Attendances ===
As of match played 11 August 2024

==== By round ====
2024 Tajikistan Higher League Attendances
| Round | Total | GP. | Avg. Per Game |
|---|---|---|---|
| Round 1 | 6,160 | 6 | 1,027 |
| Round 2 | 24,500 | 6 | 4,083 |
| Round 3 | 7,450 | 6 | 1,242 |
| Round 4 | 15,960 | 6 | 2,660 |
| Round 5 | 11,600 | 6 | 1,933 |
| Round 6 | 19,850 | 6 | 3,308 |
| Round 7 | 28,300 | 6 | 4,717 |
| Round 8 | 15,800 | 6 | 2,633 |
| Round 9 | 29,950 | 6 | 4,992 |
| Round 10 | 9,850 | 6 | 1,642 |
| Round 11 | 21,900 | 6 | 3,650 |
| Round 12 | 16,850 | 5 | 3,370 |
| Round 13 | 12,100 | 6 | 2,017 |
| Total | 220,270 | 77 | 2,861 |

==== By team ====
| Team \ Match played | 1 | 2 | 3 | 4 | 5 | 6 | 7 | 8 | 9 | 10 | 11 | 12 | 13 | 14 | 15 | 16 | 17 | 18 | 19 | 20 | 21 | 22 | Total | Average |
|---|---|---|---|---|---|---|---|---|---|---|---|---|---|---|---|---|---|---|---|---|---|---|---|---|
| Barkchi | 150 | —N/a | 100 | —N/a | 850 | —N/a | 500 | —N/a | 300 | 350 | —N/a | —N/a | 400 | | | | | | | | | | 1,800 | 300 |
| CSKA Pamir | —N/a | —N/a | 500 | —N/a | 350 | —N/a | 400 | —N/a | 1,000 | —N/a | 400 | 350 | 800 | | | | | | | | | | 3,800 | 543 |
| Eskhata | —N/a | 1,220 | —N/a | 2,200 | —N/a | 6,000 | —N/a | 2,000 | —N/a | 0 | —N/a | 1,200 | —N/a | | | | | | | | | | 12,620 | 2,524 |
| Istaravshan | —N/a | 3,000 | —N/a | 5,000 | —N/a | —N/a | 10,200 | —N/a | 18,300 | —N/a | 3,600 | | —N/a | | | | | | | | | | 40,100 | 8,020 |
| Istiklol | 2,000 | 600 | 3,000 | —N/a | 850 | —N/a | 2,000 | 750 | —N/a | 2,600 | —N/a | —N/a | —N/a | | | | | | | | | | 11,800 | 1,686 |
| Hosilot Farkhor | 1,000 | —N/a | 3,200 | 3,260 | —N/a | 5,000 | —N/a | 5,500 | —N/a | 2,700 | —N/a | —N/a | 3,100 | | | | | | | | | | 23,760 | 3,394 |
| Khujand | 4,500 | 6,000 | —N/a | 5,000 | —N/a | 1,450 | —N/a | 4,000 | —N/a | 2,700 | —N/a | —N/a | —N/a | | | | | | | | | | 23,650 | 3,942 |
| Kuktosh Rudaki | —N/a | 300 | —N/a | 300 | —N/a | 500 | —N/a | 400 | —N/a | —N/a | 1,200 | 3,000 | —N/a | | | | | | | | | | 5,700 | 950 |
| Panjshir | 110 | —N/a | 250 | —N/a | 250 | —N/a | 4,500 | —N/a | 450 | —N/a | 500 | —N/a | 1,300 | | | | | | | | | | 6,910 | 1,152 |
| Ravshan Kulob | —N/a | 13,380 | —N/a | —N/a | 8,500 | —N/a | 10,700 | —N/a | 9,700 | —N/a | 15,000 | 11,100 | —N/a | | | | | | | | | | 68,380 | 11,397 |
| Regar-TadAZ | 200 | —N/a | 400 | —N/a | 800 | 6,000 | —N/a | 3,150 | —N/a | 1,500 | —N/a | —N/a | 1,500 | | | | | | | | | | 13,550 | 1,936 |
| Vakhsh Bokhtar | —N/a | —N/a | —N/a | 200 | —N/a | 900 | —N/a | —N/a | 200 | —N/a | 1,200 | 1,200 | 5,000 | | | | | | | | | | 8,700 | 1,450 |
