= 2024 FC Istiklol season =

FC Istiklol
2024 season
- President: Shohruh Saidov
- Manager: Nikola Lazarevic (until 15 September); Alisher Tukhtaev (Interim) (15 September - 4 October); Igor Cherevchenko (from 4 October)
- Stadium: Republican Stadium
- Higher League: 1st (champions)
- Tajikistan Cup: Semi-final vs Regar-TadAZ
- Super Cup: Winners
- AFC Champions League Two: Group Stage
- Top goalscorer: League: Manuchekhr Dzhalilov (17); All: Manuchekhr Dzhalilov (19)
- Highest home attendance: 3,000 vs Kuktosh Rudaki (20 April 2024)
- Lowest home attendance: 600 vs Vakhsh Bokhtar (13 April 2024)
- Average home league attendance: 1,686 (19 June 2024)
Home colours	Away colours

The FC Istiklol 2024 season is Istiklol's sixteenth Tajik League season, of which they are defending Tajik League Champions, whilst they also participated in the Tajik Cup, Tajik Supercup and AFC Champions League Two.

== Season events ==
On 11 February, Istiklol announced that Igor Cherevchenko and his coaching staff had all left the club after their contracts had expired.

On 26 February, Istiklol confirmed that both Romish Jalilov and Shahrom Sulaymonov had left the club at the end of their contracts, and joined Khosilot Farkhor.

On 15 March 2024, Istiklol announced that Nikola Lazarevic had been appointed as their new head coach on a one-year contract.

On 16 March, Istiklol announced the return of Rustam Soirov on a contract until the end of 2025, and the return of Oleksiy Larin on a contract until the end of the season. The following day, 17 March, Istiklol announced the signing of Mekhron Madaminov from Torpedo Miass on a contract until the end of 2025, and the signing of Slavko Lukić.

On 18 March, Istiklol announced the return of Amirbek Juraboev on a contract until the end of 2025.

On 19 March, Istiklol announced the signing of Murilo Souza on a contract until the end of the season.

On 20 March, Istiklol announced that Khaydar Sattorov and Salokhiddin Irgashev had joined Vakhsh Bokhtar on loan for the season, whilst Shukhratdzhon Shonazarov had joined Khujand on a similar deal. On the same day, Istiklol announced the signing of Keita Suzuki on a contract until the end of the season from Daegu.

On 21 March, Istiklol announced the signing of Blessing Eleke on a contract until the end of the season.

On 22 May, Istiklol's matches against Barkchi on 26 May and Panjshir on 1 June were postponed due to International call ups.

On 16 June, Rustam Yatimov left the club to join Russian Premier League club Rostov for a fee in excess of $250,000.

On 2 July, Istiklol announced that their contracts with Kabir Salimshoev and Alidzhon Karomatullozoda had been terminated by mutual consent.

On 8 July, Istiklol announced the return of goalkeeper Nikola Stošić, on a two-year contract.

On 9 July, Istiklol announced the departure of Slavko Lukić from the club after his contract expired.

On 12 July, Istiklol announced the departure of Ivan Novoselec and Dženis Beganović after their contracts had expired, and the signings of Darko Ilieski and Pavel Nazarenko on a contracts until the end of the season.

On 1 August, Istiklol announced the signing of Ruslan Khayloyev who'd most recently played for Tyumen.

On 3 August, Istiklol announced the signing of Matthew Millar who'd most recently played for Macarthur FC and Dimitar Mitkov from Lokomotiv 1929 Sofia both on a contracts until the end of the season.

On 4 August, Istiklol announced the signing of Francesco Margiotta who'd most recently played for Botoșani, to a one-year contract.

On 4 October, Istiklol announced the return of Igor Cherevchenko as their head coach.

== Squad ==
As of match played 11 December 2024

No.	Name	Nationality	Position	Date of birth (age)	Signed from	Signed in	Contract ends	Apps.	Goals
Goalkeepers
1	Nikola Stošić	(Serbia)	GK	15 March 1994 (aged 30)	Prva Iskra Barič	2024	2026	151	0
16	Olimjon Juraev	(Tajikistan)	GK	17 September 2003 (aged 21)	Youth team	2022		0	0
99	Mukhriddin Khasanov	(Tajikistan)	GK	23 September 2002 (aged 22)	Khujand	2021		44	0
Defenders
3	Tabrezi Davlatmir	(Tajikistan)	DF	6 June 1998 (aged 26)	Narva Trans	2022		153	3
4	Mustafo Khasanbekov	(Tajikistan)	DF	29 January 2009 (aged 15)	Academy	2024		1	0
5	Sodikjon Kurbonov	(Tajikistan)	DF	19 January 2003 (aged 21)	Dynamo Dushanbe	2023	2024	49	3
19	Akhtam Nazarov	(Tajikistan)	DF	29 September 1992 (aged 32)	Andijon	2023		290	23
21	Oleksiy Larin	(Ukraine)	DF	4 June 1994 (aged 30)	Neftchi Fergana	2024	2024	111	4
22	Akhmadzhon Shoev	(Tajikistan)	DF	1 August 2008 (aged 16)	Academy	2024		1	0
28	Keita Suzuki	(Japan)	DF	20 December 1997 (aged 26)	Daegu	2024	2024	22	1
44	Matthew Millar	(Australia)	DF	23 August 1996 (aged 28)	Unattached	2024	2024	19	1
91	Husein Qurbanov	(Tajikistan)	DF		Academy	2024		1	0
96	Darko Ilieski	(North Macedonia)	DF	14 October 1995 (aged 29)	Shkupi	2024	2024	14	2
	Pavel Nazarenko	(Belarus)	DF	20 January 1995 (aged 29)	Gomel	2024	2024	0	0
Midfielders
6	Amirbek Juraboev	(Tajikistan)	MF	13 April 1996 (aged 28)	Kedah Darul Aman	2024	2025	161	10
8	Muhammad Rajabov	(Tajikistan)	MF		Academy	2024		1	0
10	Alisher Dzhalilov	(Tajikistan)	MF	29 August 1993 (aged 31)	AGMK	2023	2024	150	67
11	Shervoni Mabatshoev	(Tajikistan)	MF	4 December 2000 (aged 24)	CSKA Pamir Dushanbe	2021		116	35
13	Amadoni Kamolov	(Tajikistan)	MF	16 January 2003 (aged 21)	Paracuellos Antamira	2023	2024	54	8
17	Ehson Panjshanbe	(Tajikistan)	MF	12 May 1999 (aged 25)	Zob Ahan Esfahan	2023	2024	161	36
18	Ruslan Khayloyev	(Tajikistan)	MF	29 October 2003 (aged 21)	Unattached	2024	2025	12	0
23	Parviz Bobonazarov	(Tajikistan)	MF	4 January 2009 (aged 15)	Academy	2024		1	0
27	Ramazon Bakhtaliev	(Tajikistan)	MF	24 October 2008 (aged 16)	Academy	2024		1	0
33	Muboriz Miskinshoev	(Tajikistan)	MF	23 February 2008 (aged 16)	Academy	2024		0	0
80	Murilo Souza	(Brazil)	MF	17 May 1996 (aged 28)	Al-Anwar	2024	2024	26	1
Forwards
9	Francesco Margiotta	(Italy)	FW	15 July 1993 (aged 31)	Unattached	2024	2025	16	6
27	Mukhammadzhon Tokhiri	(Tajikistan)	FW	15 September 2006 (aged 18)	Barkchi	2024		0	0
45	Dimitar Mitkov	(Bulgaria)	FW	27 January 2000 (aged 24)	Lokomotiv 1929 Sofia	2024	2024	18	3
63	Manuchekhr Dzhalilov	(Tajikistan)	FW	27 September 1990 (aged 34)	Persebaya Surabaya	2020		218	182
72	Mekhron Madaminov	(Tajikistan)	FW	1 May 2002 (aged 22)	Torpedo Miass	2024	2025	14	2
77	Rustam Soirov	(Tajikistan)	FW	12 September 2002 (aged 22)	Lokomotiv Tashkent	2024	2025	94	36
Away on loan
19	Khaydar Sattorov	(Tajikistan)	DF	18 February 2003 (aged 21)	Youth Team	2023		5	0
20	Shukhratdzhon Shonazarov	(Tajikistan)	MF	26 October 2002 (aged 22)	Youth Team	2022		8	0
55	Salokhiddin Irgashev	(Tajikistan)	MF	3 July 2003 (aged 21)	Metallurg Bekabad	2023	2024	2	1
	Rustam Kamolov	(Tajikistan)	FW	4 June 2007 (aged 17)	Youth Team	2022		5	0
Left during the season
1	Rustam Yatimov	(Tajikistan)	GK	13 July 1998 (aged 26)	Unattached	2018		127	0
4	Slavko Lukić	(Serbia)	DF	14 March 1989 (aged 35)	Unattached	2024		9	0
8	Dženis Beganović	(Bosnia and Herzegovina)	MF	23 March 1996 (aged 28)	Unattached	2023		31	3
9	Blessing Eleke	(Nigeria)	FW	5 March 1996 (aged 28)	Unattached	2024	2024	11	7
22	Kabir Salimshoev	(Tajikistan)	MF	1 August 2004 (aged 20)	Khosilot Farkhor	2024		5	0
23	Alidzhon Karomatullozoda	(Tajikistan)	DF	5 May 2002 (aged 22)	CSKA Pamir Dushanbe	2022		44	2
33	Ivan Novoselec	(Croatia)	DF	19 June 1995 (aged 29)	Koper	2023	2024	28	4

== Transfers ==
=== In ===
Date	Position	Nationality	Name	From	Fee	Ref.
15 March 2024	FW	(Tajikistan)	Mukhammadzhon Tokhiri	Barkchi	Undisclosed	
16 March 2024	DF	(Ukraine)	Oleksiy Larin	Neftchi Fergana	Undisclosed	
16 March 2024	FW	(Tajikistan)	Rustam Soirov	Lokomotiv Tashkent	Undisclosed	
17 March 2024	DF	(Serbia)	Slavko Lukić	Unattached	Free	
17 March 2024	FW	(Tajikistan)	Mekhron Madaminov	Torpedo Miass	Undisclosed	
18 March 2024	MF	(Tajikistan)	Amirbek Juraboev	Kedah Darul Aman	Undisclosed	
19 March 2024	MF	(Brazil)	Murilo Souza	Al-Anwar	Undisclosed	
20 March 2024	DF	(Japan)	Keita Suzuki	Daegu	Undisclosed	
21 March 2024	FW	(Nigeria)	Blessing Eleke	Unattached	Free	
8 July 2024	GK	(Serbia)	Nikola Stošić	Prva Iskra Barič	Undisclosed	
12 July 2024	DF	(North Macedonia)	Darko Ilieski	Shkupi	Free	
12 July 2024	DF	(Belarus)	Pavel Nazarenko	Gomel	Undisclosed	
1 August 2024	MF	(Tajikistan)	Ruslan Khayloyev	Unattached	Free	
3 August 2024	DF	(Australia)	Matthew Millar	Unattached	Free	
3 August 2024	FW	(Bulgaria)	Dimitar Mitkov	Lokomotiv 1929 Sofia	Undisclosed	
4 August 2024	FW	(Italy)	Francesco Margiotta	Unattached	Free	

=== Out ===
Date	Position	Nationality	Name	To	Fee	Ref.
28 February 2024	FW	(Tajikistan)	Pakhlavon Bakhrizoda	Istaravshan	Undisclosed	
16 June 2024	GK	(Tajikistan)	Rustam Yatimov	Rostov	Undisclosed	

=== Loans out ===
Date	Position	Nationality	Name	To	Fee	Ref.
20 March 2024	DF	(Tajikistan)	Khaydar Sattorov	Vakhsh Bokhtar	End of season	
20 March 2024	MF	(Tajikistan)	Salokhiddin Irgashev	Vakhsh Bokhtar	End of season	
20 March 2024	MF	(Tajikistan)	Shukhratdzhon Shonazarov	Khujand	End of season	

=== Released ===
Date	Position	Nationality	Name	Joined	Date	Ref
26 February 2024	MF	(Tajikistan)	Romish Jalilov	Khosilot Farkhor	26 February 2024	
26 February 2024	MF	(Tajikistan)	Shahrom Sulaymonov	Khosilot Farkhor	26 February 2024	
2 July 2024	DF	(Tajikistan)	Alidzhon Karomatullozoda	Khosilot Farkhor	10 July 2024	
2 July 2024	MF	(Tajikistan)	Kabir Salimshoev	Panjshir	3 April 2025	
9 July 2024	DF	(Croatia)	Slavko Lukić	SC Bengaluru		
12 July 2024	DF	(Croatia)	Ivan Novoselec	Punjab	4 August 2024	
12 July 2024	MF	(Bosnia and Herzegovina)	Dženis Beganović	Re-Signed	27 January 2025	
31 July 2024	FW	(Nigeria)	Blessing Eleke	Partizani Tirana	23 January 2025	
31 December 2024	MF	(Tajikistan)	Ehson Panjshanbe	Sogdiana Jizzakh	1 January 2025	
31 December 2024	DF	(Ukraine)	Oleksiy Larin			
31 December 2024	DF	(Japan)	Keita Suzuki			
31 December 2024	DF	(Australia)	Matthew Millar	Havadar	12 January 2025	
31 December 2024	DF	(Belarus)	Pavel Nazarenko	Minsk	25 July 2025	
31 December 2024	DF	(North Macedonia)	Darko Ilieski	Bylis	11 January 2025	
31 December 2024	MF	(Brazil)	Murilo Souza	Southern	6 July 2025	
31 December 2024	MF	(Tajikistan)	Salokhiddin Irgashev	Arsenal Dzerzhinsk	4 March 2025	
31 December 2024	FW	(Bulgaria)	Dimitar Mitkov	Spartak Varna	9 January 2025	
31 December 2024	FW	(Italy)	Francesco Margiotta	Rànger's	15 February 2025	

== Friendlies ==
17 February 2024	Istiklol	3–2	Regar-TadAZ	Dushanbe
(UTC+5)		Report		Stadium: Pamir Stadium

28 February 2024	Istiklol	2–1	FA 2000	Belek, Turkey
18:00 (UTC+5)		Report

4 March 2024	Istiklol	1–3	HJK Helsinki	Belek, Turkey
18:00 (UTC+5)	(o.g.)	Report	Olusanya; Kanellopoulos; Anini

7 March 2024	Istiklol	1–1	Spartak-2 Moscow	Belek, Turkey
13:00 (UTC+5)		Report

31 March 2024	Istiklol	4–1	Regar-TadAZ	Dushanbe
17:00 (UTC+5)	Eleke 33', 46' (yellow card); Mabatshoev 40'; A.Dzhalilov 62' (pen.); Soirov (yellow card); Novoselec (yellow card)	Report	Rashidbekov 89' (pen.); Feumba (yellow card)	Stadium: Pamir Stadium; Referee: Sayodjon Zainiddinov

13 July 2024	Neman Grodno	3–2	Istiklol	Grodno, Belarus
20:00 (UTC+5)	Gweth 16'; Alykulov 45' (pen.), 49'	Report	Kurbonov 63'; Panjshanbe 89'	Stadium: Neman Stadium

17 July 2024	AGMK	6–0	Istiklol	Zhodzina, Belarus
20:00 (UTC+5)	Giyosov 1'; Abdurakhmonov 8'; Datsi 50', 81'; Komilov 55'; Kholmurodov 84'	Report		Stadium: Torpedo Stadium

19 July 2024	BATE Borisov	2–0	Istiklol	Minsk, Belarus
20:00 (UTC+5)	Shvedchikov 8'; Zhulpa 82'	Report	Panjshanbe (penalty missed) 88'	Stadium: Borisov Arena

== Competitions ==
=== Overview ===
Competition	First match	Last match	Starting round	Final position	Record							
Competition	First match	Last match	Starting round	Final position	Pld	W	D	L	GF	GA	GD	Win %
Higher League	7 April 2024	11 December 2024	Matchday 1	Winners	22	19	2	1	62	11	+51	86.36
Tajikistan Cup	28 July 2024	10 October 2024	Last 16	Semifinal	6	4	1	1	17	6	+11	66.67
Tajik Super Cup	11 May 2024	11 May 2024	Final	Winners	1	1	0	0	2	1	+1	100.00
AFC Champions League Two	17 September 2024	3 December 2024	Group Stage	Group Stage	6	0	0	6	1	12	−11	0.00
Total					35	24	3	8	82	30	+52	68.57

Last updated: 11 December 2024
Source: Competitions

=== Tajik Supercup ===
11 May 2024	Istiklol	2–1	Ravshan Kulob	Tursunzoda
17:00 (UTC+5)	Soirov 27'; Eleke 69' (yellow card); Panjshanbe (yellow card); A.Nazarov (yellow card); Beganović (yellow card); Davlatmir (yellow card)	Report	Nurnazarov 84'; K.Nazarov (yellow card); Babadjanov (yellow card); Murodov (yellow card); Sultonov (yellow card)	Stadium: TALCO Arena; Attendance: 7,500; Referee: Nasrullo Kabirov

=== Higher League ===
==== Regular season ====
===== Results summary =====
Overall								Home						Away					
Pld	W	D	L	GF	GA	GD	Pts	W	D	L	GF	GA	GD	W	D	L	GF	GA	GD
22	19	2	1	62	11	+51	59	9	1	1	37	5	+32	10	1	0	25	6	+19

Last updated: 11 December 2024.
Source: See Results

===== Results by round =====
Round	1	2	3	4	5	6	7	10	8^{1}	11	9^{1}	13	12	14	15	20	21	16	17	18	19	22
Ground	H	H	H	A	H	A	H	H	H	A	A	A	A	A	H	H	A	A	H	A	A	H
Result	W	W	W	W	W	W	W	W	W	W	W	W	W	W	L	W	W	D	D	W	W	W
Position	1	1	1	1	1	1	1	1	1	1	1	1	1	1	1	1	1	1	1	1	1	1

Source: Results
A = Away; H = Home; W = Win; D = Draw; L = Loss; P = Postponed
Notes:
- ^{1} Matchdays 8 & 9 (vs Barkchi and Panjshir) were postponed due to the international call-ups.

===== Results =====
7 April 2024 1	Istiklol	3–1	Istaravshan	Dushanbe
16:00 (UTC+5)	A.Dzhalilov 12' (yellow card); Eleke (penalty missed) 61' (yellow card); Panjshanbe 64'; M.Dzhalilov 90+2'	Report	Siyabatchu 35'; Rasulov (yellow card)	Stadium: Pamir Stadium; Attendance: 2,000; Referee: Nasrullo Kabirov

13 April 2024 2	Istiklol	3–0	Vakhsh Bokhtar	Dushanbe
16:00 (UTC+5)	A.Dzhalilov 23' (pen.) (yellow card); Mabatshoev 45', 47'	Report	Uzokov (red card) 22'; Ismailov (yellow card)	Stadium: Pamir Stadium; Attendance: 600; Referee: Abdullah Davlatov
Note: Fixtures were reversed due to ongoing repairs at the Tsentralnyi Stadium in Bokhtar.

20 April 2024 3	Istiklol	6–0	Kuktosh Rudaki	Dushanbe
20:00 (UTC+5)	A.Dzhalilov 1' (yellow card); Eleke 44', 72', 90+3'; Beganović 57'; Novoselec 85'; Panjshanbe (yellow card)	Report	Abdugafforov (yellow card)	Stadium: Pamir Stadium; Attendance: 3,000; Referee: Bakhtiyor Komilov

28 April 2024 4	Khujand	0–1	Istiklol	Khujand
18:00 (UTC+5)	Bikatal (yellow card)	Report	Panjshanbe 29' (pen.) (yellow card); Nazarov (yellow card); Soirov (yellow card); Yatimov (yellow card)	Stadium: 20 Years of Independence Stadium; Attendance: 5,000; Referee: Abdullah Davlatov

4 May 2024 5	Istiklol	3–1	Khosilot Farkhor	Dushanbe
15:00 (UTC+5)	Eleke 4', 68'; Kamolov 64' (yellow card); A.Dzhalilov (yellow card)	Report	Boboev 59'; Junior (yellow card)	Stadium: Pamir Stadium; Attendance: 850; Referee: Nasrullo Kabirov

15 May 2024 6	Regar-TadAZ	1–2	Istiklol	Tursunzoda
18:00 (UTC+5)	Solehov 59'; Feumba (red card) 73'; Makhamadiev (yellow card)	Report	A.Dzhalilov 31' (yellow card); M.Dzhalilov 69'; Soirov (yellow card) (red card) 73'; Eleke (yellow card); Davlatmir (yellow card); Yatimov (yellow card)	Stadium: TALCO Arena; Attendance: 6,000; Referee: Navruz Vahidov

19 May 2024 7	Istiklol	6–1	Eskhata	Dushanbe
18:00 (UTC+5)	Suzuki 38'; Souza 41' (yellow card); Eleke 42'; Mabatshoev 76'; M.Dzhalilov 82'; Novoselec 90+3'; Kurbonov (yellow card); Yatimov (yellow card)	Report	Uzokov (red card) 9'; Asrorov 90+9' (pen.); Safarov (yellow card); Surov (yellow card)	Stadium: Pamir Stadium; Attendance: 2,000; Referee: Sayodjon Zainiddinov

16 June 2024 10	Istiklol	2–0	CSKA Pamir Dushanbe	Dushanbe
19:00 (UTC+5)	M.Dzhalilov 71', 79'; Suzuki (yellow card); A.Dzhalilov (yellow card); Novoselec (yellow card)	Report	Kwasi (yellow card); Khabibov (yellow card); Ibrokhimov (yellow card); Mirzokhon (yellow card)	Stadium: Pamir Stadium; Attendance: 2,600; Referee: Sayodjon Zainiddinov

19 June 2023 8	Istiklol	9–1	Barkchi Hisor	Dushanbe
18:00 (UTC+5)	Kamolov 19'; Panjshanbe 22'; M.Dzhalilov 40', 59', 66', 87'; Soirov 45'; Novoselec 51'; A.Dzhalilov 65'	Report	Babaev 23'	Stadium: Pamir Stadium; Attendance: 750; Referee: Navruz Vokhidov
Note: Match originally scheduled for 26 May, but postponed on 22 May due to International call ups.

23 June 2024 11	Ravshan Kulob	0–1	Istiklol	Kulob
19:00 (UTC+5)	Rakhimov (yellow card) (yellow-red card) 90+1'; Babadjanov (yellow card)	Report	Kamolov 48' (yellow card); Juraboev (red card) 90+8'; Kurbonov (yellow card); Panjshanbe (yellow card); Davlatmir (yellow card); Khasanov (yellow card)	Stadium: Langari Langarieva Stadium; Attendance: 15,000; Referee: Abdullah Davlatov

26 June 2024 9	Panjshir	0–3	Istiklol	Balkh
19:00 (UTC+5)	Odinaev (yellow card)	Report	M.Dzhalilov 16' (pen.); Bonney 31' (o.g.); Kamolov 37'; Kurbonov (yellow card)	Stadium: Panjsher Stadium; Attendance: 450; Referee: Bakhtiyor Komilov
Note: Match originally scheduled for 1 June, but postponed on 22 May due to International call ups.

10 August 2024 13	Vakhsh Bokhtar	0–1	Istiklol	Bokhtar
17:30 (UTC+5)	Naskov (yellow card)	Report	Millar 30' (yellow card); Panjshanbe (yellow card); Soirov (yellow card)	Stadium: Tsentralnyi Stadium; Attendance: 5,000; Referee: Bakhtovar Komilov

14 August 2024 12	Istaravshan	0–2	Istiklol	Istaravshan
17:00 (UTC+5)	Meliev (yellow card); Amiri (yellow card); Ziyozoda (yellow card)	Report	Margiotta 14'; Mabatshoev (yellow card); Mitkov (yellow card)	Stadium: Istaravshan-Arena; Attendance: 6,600; Referee: Amirjon Horkashev
Note: Match originally scheduled for 30 June, but postponed on 30 June.

18 August 2024 14	Kuktosh Rudaki	0–2	Istiklol	Chorgulteppa
18:00 (UTC+5)	Tangara (yellow card); Kahorov (yellow card)	Report	Mitkov 54'; Ilieski 75'; Suzuki (yellow card)	Stadium: Rudaki Stadium; Attendance: 530; Referee: Ravshan Ishmatov

8 September 2024 15	Istiklol	0–1	Khujand	Dushanbe
18:00 (UTC+5)	Panjshanbe (yellow card)	Report	Ergashev 77'; Serdyuk (yellow card); Dadoboev (yellow card)	Stadium: Pamir Stadium; Attendance: 1,000; Referee: Bakhtiyor Komilov

26 October 2024 20	Istiklol	4–0	Panjshir	Dushanbe
16:00 (UTC+5)	Panjshanbe 47'; Mabatshoev 62'; Juraboev 80'; A.Dzhalilov 90+3' (yellow card)	Report	Sheraliev (yellow card)	Stadium: Pamir Stadium; Referee: Bakhtiyor Komilov

30 October 2024 21	CSKA Pamir Dushanbe	1–2	Istiklol	Tursunzoda
15:00 (UTC+5)	Kwasi 82'; Gaten (yellow card); Sharipov (yellow card); Mirzokhon (yellow card)	Report	M.Dzhalilov 90', 90+7' (pen.); Panjshanbe (yellow card); Davlatmir (yellow card); Kurbonov (yellow card)	Stadium: TALCO Arena; Referee: Rustam Abdullaev

14 November 2024 16	Khosilot Farkhor	3–3	Istiklol	Dushanbe
14:30 (UTC+5)	Tagoyzoda 27', 45'; Boboev 69' (pen.); Obama (yellow card)	Report	M.Dzhalilov 14' (pen.); Margiotta 29', 75'	Stadium: Pamir Stadium; Referee: Khurshed Dodobaev
Note: Match originally scheduled for 22 September 2024.

20 November 2024 17	Istiklol	0–0	Regar-TadAZ	Dushanbe
14:30 (UTC+5)	Kamolov (yellow card); Ilieski (yellow card); Larin (yellow card); Souza (yellow card)	Report	Yakubjon Akhmadov, Shukhrat Elmurodov ("Regar-TadAZ").	Stadium: Pamir Stadium; Referee: Amirjon Horkashev
Note: Match originally scheduled for 6 October 2024.

22 November 2024 18	Eskhata	0–3	Istiklol	Khujand
14:00 (UTC+5)	Fatkhulloyev (yellow card)	Report	Panjshanbe 15'; M.Dzhalilov 78'; Soirov 85' (yellow card)	Stadium: 20 Years of Independence Stadium; Referee: Nasrullo Kabirov
Note: Match originally scheduled for 13 October 2024.

30 November 2024 19	Barkchi Hisor	1–5	Istiklol	Hisar
14:00 (UTC+5)	Onano 55'	Report	M.Dzhalilov 11', 33', 61'; Mitkov 41'; Soirov 47' (yellow card); Khasanbekov (yellow card); Madaminov (yellow card)	Stadium: Ibrogimbek Gaforov Stadium
Note: Match originally scheduled for 19 October 2024.

11 December 2024 22	Istiklol	1–0	Ravshan Kulob	Dushanbe
14:00 (UTC+5)	Ilieski 90+3'; Mabatshoev (yellow card); Madaminov (yellow card); Khayloyev (yellow card)	Report	Matić (yellow card); Rakhimov (yellow card)	Stadium: Pamir Stadium; Referee: Nasrullo Kabirov
Note: Match originally scheduled for 10 November 2024.

===== League table =====
Pos	Team	Pld	W	D	L	GF	GA	GD	Pts	Qualification or relegation
1	Istiklol (C)	22	19	2	1	59	11	+48	59	Qualification for AFC Champions League Two
2	Khujand	22	13	4	5	38	16	+22	43	
3	Ravshan Kulob	22	11	8	3	33	17	+16	41	
4	CSKA Pamir	22	11	6	5	36	21	+15	39	
5	Vakhsh Bokhtar	22	11	2	9	26	21	+5	35	

Source: Soccerway
Rules for classification: 1) Points; 2) Head-to-head points; 3) Head-to-head goal difference; 4) Head-to-head goals scored; 5) Goal difference; 6) Goals scored.
(C) Champions

=== Tajikistan Cup ===
28 July 2024 Last 16 1st leg	Istiklol	6–1	Eskhata	Dushanbe
19:00 (UTC+5)	Soirov 16'; M.Dzhalilov 56', 59' (pen.); Mabatshoev 65'; Madaminov 74'; Panjshanbe 84' (yellow card); A.Dzhalilov (yellow card)	Report	Imomnazarov 9'; Sharifi (yellow card)	Stadium: Pamir Stadium; Referee: Bakhtiyor Komilov

4 August 2024 Last 16 2nd leg	Eskhata	2–8 (3–14 agg.)	Istiklol	Dushanbe
20:00 (UTC+5)	Juraev 49'; Fatkhulloyev 65' (pen.)	Report	Margiotta 19', 26', 39'; Juraboev 19', 47'; A.Dzhalilov 31' (pen.); Mabatshoev 33'; Panjshanbe 36'	Stadium: Pamir Stadium; Attendance: 500; Referee: Navruz Vahidov

25 August 2024 Quarterfinal 1st leg	Istiklol	2–1	Istaravshan	Dushanbe
19:00 (UTC+5)	Madaminov 17'; Mitkov 42' (pen.); Davlatmir (yellow card); Juraboev (yellow card)	Report	Kholmurodov 84'; Kosimov (yellow card)	Stadium: Pamir Stadium; Attendance: 300; Referee: Abdullo Davlatov

30 August 2024 Quarterfinal 2nd leg	Istaravshan	0–0 (2–1 agg.)	Istiklol	Istaravshan
16:00 (UTC+5)		Report	Bozorov (yellow card)	Stadium: Istaravshan-Arena; Attendance: 7,000; Referee: Nasrullo Kabirov

24 September 2024 Semifinal 1st leg	Istiklol	0–2	Regar-TadAZ	Dushanbe
21:00 (UTC+5)	M.Dzhalilov (yellow card); A.Dzhalilov (yellow card); Juraboev (yellow card); Souza (yellow card)	Report	Feumba 26' (yellow card); Frimpong 55'; Azimov (yellow card); Panny (yellow card); Bortey (yellow card)	Stadium: Pamir Stadium; Attendance: 1,200; Referee: Ravshan Ishmatov

10 October 2024 Semifinal 2nd leg	Regar-TadAZ	0–1 (2–1 agg.)	Istiklol	Tursunzoda
17:30 (UTC+5)	Kalandarov (yellow card); Azimov (yellow card); Frimpong (yellow card); Pani (yellow card); Panjiev (yellow card)	Report	Mabatshoev 22'; Soirov (yellow card); A.Dzhalilov (yellow card); Millar (yellow card)	Stadium: TALCO Arena; Attendance: 1,500; Referee: Sayodjon Zainiddinov

=== AFC Champions League Two ===
==== Group stage ====
Pos	Team	Pld	W	D	L	GF	GA	GD	Pts	Qualification
1	(United Arab Emirates) Sharjah	6	4	1	1	13	8	+5	13	Advance to round of 16
2	(Jordan) Al-Wehdat	6	3	2	1	8	7	+1	11	Advance to round of 16
3	(Iran) Sepahan	6	3	1	2	12	7	+5	10	
4	(Tajikistan) Istiklol	6	0	0	6	1	12	−11	0	

Source: AFC
Rules for classification: Tiebreakers

17 September 2024 1	Istiklol (Tajikistan)	0–1	(United Arab Emirates) Sharjah	Dushanbe, Tajikistan
21:00 (UTC+5)	Panjshanbe (yellow card) 20'; A.Dzhalilov (yellow card) 21'; Kurbonov (yellow card) 52'; Soirov (yellow card) 80'	Report	Nejašmić (yellow card) 66'; Firas 72'; Abdulbasit (yellow card) 78'; Petrović (yellow card) 79'	Stadium: Central Republican Stadium; Attendance: 10,250; Referee: Ammar Ebrahim Mahfoodh (Bahrain)

1 October 2024 2	Sepahan (Iran)	4–0	(Tajikistan) Istiklol	Isfahan, Iran
21:00 (UTC+5)	Kamara 40'; Aghaeipour 43', 46'; Dabo 76'	Report	Suzuki (yellow card) 49'	Stadium: Naghsh-e Jahan Stadium; Attendance: 6,733; Referee: Ryo Tanimoto (Japan)

22 October 2024 3	Istiklol (Tajikistan)	0–1	(Jordan) Al-Wehdat	Dushanbe, Tajikistan
19:00 (UTC+5)	Juraboev (yellow card) 30'; Kurbonov (yellow card) 90'	Report	Jamous (yellow card) 21'; Abu Al-Jazar (yellow card) 43'; Faisal 51'; Fahid (yellow card) 57'; Shawkat (yellow card) 88'; Al-Quz'a (yellow card) 90+4'	Stadium: Central Republican Stadium; Attendance: 6,745; Referee: Mohanad Qasim Sarray (Iraq)

5 November 2024 4	Al-Wehdat (Jordan)	1–0	(Tajikistan) Istiklol	Amman, Jordan
21:00 (UTC+5)	Gueye (yellow card) 4' (goal) 77'; Abu Al-Jazar (yellow card) 10'; Semreen (yellow card) 90+2'	Report		Stadium: Amman International Stadium; Attendance: 1,124; Referee: Majed Al-Shamrani (Saudi Arabia)
Note: Al-Wehdat played their home matches at Amman International Stadium, Amman, instead of their regular home stadium King Abdullah II Stadium, Amman.

26 November 2024 5	Sharjah (United Arab Emirates)	3–1	(Tajikistan) Istiklol	Sharjah, United Arab Emirates
19:00 (UTC+5)	Luanzinho 21' (yellow card) 52'; Camara 30'; Caio 58' (pen.); Ghanem (yellow card) 69'; Al-Hosani (yellow card) 81'; Meloni (yellow card) 86'	Report	Panjshanbe 24'; A.Dzhalilov (yellow card) 59'	Stadium: Sharjah Stadium; Attendance: 689; Referee: Kim Woo-sung (South Korea)

3 December 2024 6	Istiklol (Tajikistan)	0–2	(Iran) Sepahan	Dushanbe, Tajikistan
19:00 (UTC+5)	M.Dzhalilov (yellow card) 74'; Kurbonov (yellow card) 81'	Report	Karimi 55' (pen.); Kamara 80'	Stadium: Central Republican Stadium; Referee: Qasim Al-Hatmi (Oman)

== Squad statistics ==
As of match played 11 December 2024

=== Appearances and goals ===
No.	Pos	Nat	Player	Total		Higher League		Tajikistan Cup		Super Cup		AFC Champions League Two	
No.	Pos	Nat	Player	Apps	Goals	Apps	Goals	Apps	Goals	Apps	Goals	Apps	Goals
1	GK	(Serbia) SRB	Nikola Stošić	10	0	5	0	2	0	0	0	3	0
3	DF	(Tajikistan) TJK	Tabrezi Davlatmir	27	0	16+2	0	4+1	0	1	0	1+2	0
4	MF	(Tajikistan) TJK	Mustafo Khasanbekov	1	0	0+1	0	0	0	0	0	0	0
5	DF	(Tajikistan) TJK	Sodikjon Kurbonov	24	0	11+2	0	4	0	1	0	5+1	0
6	MF	(Tajikistan) TJK	Amirbek Juraboev	30	3	13+5	1	5	2	1	0	6	0
8	MF	(Tajikistan) TJK	Muhammad Rajabov	1	0	0+1	0	0	0	0	0	0	0
9	FW	(Italy) ITA	Francesco Margiotta	16	6	7+2	3	4	3	0	0	1+2	0
10	MF	(Tajikistan) TJK	Alisher Dzhalilov	29	7	16+2	6	4	1	1	0	6	0
11	MF	(Tajikistan) TJK	Shervoni Mabatshoev	32	8	17+2	5	5+1	3	0+1	0	4+2	0
13	MF	(Tajikistan) TJK	Amadoni Kamolov	14	4	9+1	4	0	0	1	0	2+1	0
17	MF	(Tajikistan) TJK	Ehson Panjshanbe	30	8	18+1	5	4	2	1	0	6	1
18	MF	(Tajikistan) TJK	Ruslan Khayloyev	12	0	4+4	0	1+3	0	0	0	0	0
19	DF	(Tajikistan) TJK	Akhtam Nazarov	25	0	8+7	0	3+1	0	0+1	0	2+3	0
21	DF	(Ukraine) UKR	Oleksiy Larin	22	0	9+2	0	5	0	0	0	6	0
22	DF	(Tajikistan) TJK	Akhmadzhon Shoev	1	0	0+1	0	0	0	0	0	0	0
23	MF	(Tajikistan) TJK	Parviz Bobonazarov	1	0	1	0	0	0	0	0	0	0
27	MF	(Tajikistan) TJK	Ramazon Bakhtaliev	1	0	0+1	0	0	0	0	0	0	0
28	DF	(Japan) JPN	Keita Suzuki	22	1	8+5	1	3+2	0	0	0	4	0
44	DF	(Australia) AUS	Matthew Millar	19	1	7+1	1	3+2	0	0	0	6	0
45	FW	(Bulgaria) BUL	Dimitar Mitkov	18	3	6+3	2	4+1	1	0	0	1+3	0
63	FW	(Tajikistan) TJK	Manuchekhr Dzhalilov	31	19	6+15	17	2+2	2	0+1	0	2+3	0
72	FW	(Tajikistan) TJK	Mekhron Madaminov	13	2	2+7	0	2+2	2	0	0	0	0
77	FW	(Tajikistan) TJK	Rustam Soirov	24	5	7+7	3	2+1	1	1	1	2+4	0
80	MF	(Brazil) BRA	Murilo Souza	26	1	16+2	1	3+2	0	0	0	3	0
91	DF	(Tajikistan) TJK	Husein Qurbanov	1	0	1	0	0	0	0	0	0	0
96	DF	(North Macedonia) MKD	Darko Ilieski	14	2	8	2	2+1	0	0	0	3	0
99	GK	(Tajikistan) TJK	Mukhriddin Khasanov	17	0	10	0	4	0	0	0	3	0
Youth team players:
Players away from Istiklol on loan:
Players who left Istiklol during the season:
1	GK	(Tajikistan) TJK	Rustam Yatimov	8	0	7	0	0	0	1	0	0	0
4	DF	(Serbia) SRB	Slavko Lukić	9	0	4+4	0	0	0	0+1	0	0	0
8	MF	(Bosnia and Herzegovina) BIH	Dženis Beganović	12	1	8+3	1	0	0	1	0	0	0
9	FW	(Nigeria) NGR	Blessing Eleke	11	7	9+1	6	0	0	1	1	0	0
22	MF	(Tajikistan) TJK	Kabir Salimshoev	5	0	0+5	0	0	0	0	0	0	0
23	DF	(Tajikistan) TJK	Alidzhon Karomatullozoda	3	0	1+2	0	0	0	0	0	0	0
33	DF	(Croatia) CRO	Ivan Novoselec	9	3	7+1	3	0	0	1	0	0	0

=== Goal scorers ===
Place	Position	Nation	Number	Name	Higher League	Tajikistan Cup	Super Cup	AFC Champions League Two	Total
1	FW	(Tajikistan)	63	Manuchekhr Dzhalilov	17	2	0	0	19
2	MF	(Tajikistan)	11	Shervoni Mabatshoev	5	3	0	0	8
2	MF	(Tajikistan)	17	Ehson Panjshanbe	5	2	0	1	8
4	MF	(Tajikistan)	10	Alisher Dzhalilov	6	1	0	0	7
4	FW	(Nigeria)	9	Blessing Eleke	6	0	1	0	7
6	FW	(Italy)	9	Francesco Margiotta	3	3	0	0	6
7	FW	(Tajikistan)	77	Rustam Soirov	3	1	1	0	5
8	MF	(Tajikistan)	13	Amadoni Kamolov	4	0	0	0	4
9	DF	(Croatia)	33	Ivan Novoselec	3	0	0	0	3
9	FW	(Bulgaria)	45	Dimitar Mitkov	2	1	0	0	3
9	MF	(Tajikistan)	6	Amirbek Juraboev	1	2	0	0	3
12	DF	(North Macedonia)	96	Darko Ilieski	2	0	0	0	2
12	FW	(Tajikistan)	72	Mekhron Madaminov	0	2	0	0	2
14	MF	(Bosnia and Herzegovina)	8	Dženis Beganović	1	0	0	0	1
14	DF	(Japan)	28	Keita Suzuki	1	0	0	0	1
14	MF	(Brazil)	80	Murilo Souza	1	0	0	0	1
14	DF	(Australia)	44	Matthew Millar	1	0	0	0	1
14				Own goal	1	0	0	0	1
TOTALS					62	17	2	1	82

=== Clean sheets ===
Place	Position	Nation	Number	Name	Higher League	Tajikistan Cup	Super Cup	AFC Champions League Two	Total
1	GK	(Tajikistan)	99	Mukhriddin Khasanov	7	1	0	0	8
2	GK	(Serbia)	1	Nikola Stošić	3	1	0	0	4
3	GK	(Tajikistan)	1	Rustam Yatimov	3	0	0	0	3
TOTALS					12	2	0	0	14

=== Disciplinary record ===
Number	Nation	Position	Name	Higher League		Tajikistan Cup		Super Cup		AFC Champions League Two		Total	
Number	Nation	Position	Name	Booked	Sent off (straight red)	Booked	Sent off (straight red)	Booked	Sent off (straight red)	Booked	Sent off (straight red)	Booked	Sent off (straight red)
3	(Tajikistan)	DF	Tabrezi Davlatmir	3	0	1	0	1	0	0	0	5	0
4	(Tajikistan)	DF	Mustafo Khasanbekov	1	0	0	0	0	0	0	0	1	0
5	(Tajikistan)	DF	Sodikjon Kurbonov	4	0	0	0	0	0	3	0	7	0
6	(Tajikistan)	MF	Amirbek Juraboev	0	1	2	0	0	0	1	0	3	1
10	(Tajikistan)	MF	Alisher Dzhalilov	7	0	3	0	0	0	2	0	12	0
11	(Tajikistan)	MF	Shervoni Mabatshoev	1	0	0	0	0	0	0	0	1	0
13	(Tajikistan)	MF	Amadoni Kamolov	3	0	0	0	0	0	0	0	3	0
17	(Tajikistan)	MF	Ehson Panjshanbe	6	0	1	0	1	0	1	0	9	0
18	(Tajikistan)	MF	Ruslan Khayloyev	1	0	0	0	0	0	0	0	1	0
19	(Tajikistan)	DF	Akhtam Nazarov	1	0	0	0	1	0	0	0	2	0
21	(Ukraine)	DF	Oleksiy Larin	1	0	0	0	0	0	0	0	1	0
28	(Japan)	DF	Keita Suzuki	2	0	0	0	0	0	1	0	3	0
44	(Australia)	DF	Matthew Millar	1	0	1	0	0	0	0	0	2	0
45	(Bulgaria)	FW	Dimitar Mitkov	1	0	0	0	0	0	0	0	1	0
63	(Tajikistan)	FW	Manuchekhr Dzhalilov	0	0	1	0	0	0	1	0	2	0
72	(Tajikistan)	FW	Mekhron Madaminov	2	0	0	0	0	0	0	0	2	0
77	(Tajikistan)	FW	Rustam Soirov	5	1	1	0	0	0	1	0	7	1
80	(Brazil)	MF	Murilo Souza	2	0	1	0	0	0	0	0	3	0
96	(North Macedonia)	DF	Darko Ilieski	1	0	0	0	0	0	0	0	1	0
99	(Tajikistan)	GK	Mukhriddin Khasanov	1	0	0	0	0	0	0	0	1	0
Players who left Istiklol during the season:
1	(Tajikistan)	GK	Rustam Yatimov	3	0	0	0	0	0	0	0	3	0
8	(Bosnia and Herzegovina)	MF	Dženis Beganović	0	0	0	0	1	0	0	0	1	0
9	(Nigeria)	FW	Blessing Eleke	2	0	0	0	1	0	0	0	3	0
33	(Croatia)	DF	Ivan Novoselec	1	0	0	0	0	0	0	0	1	0
			TOTALS	46	2	11	0	5	0	10	0	72	2
