= Slavko =

Slavko (Cyrillic: Славко) is a Slavic masculine given name. Notable holders of the name include:

== Arts ==
- Slavko Avsenik, Slovenian musician
- Slavko Avsenik, Jr., Slovenian musician
- Slavko Brankov, Croatian actor
- Slavko Brill, Croatian Jewish sculptor
- Slavko Kalezić, Montenegrin singer
- Slavko Labović, Serbian-Danish actor
- Slavko Osterc, Slovenian composer
- Slavko Pengov, Slovene painter
- Slavko Sobin, Croatian actor
- Slavko Stolnik, Croatian painter
- Slavko Štimac, Serbian actor
- Slavko Vorkapić, Serbian-American film director

== Politics and Military ==
- Slavko Cuvaj, Croatian politician
- Slavko Dokmanović, Croatian Serb politician
- Slavko Kvaternik, Croatian fascist leader
- Slavko Linić, Croatian politician
- Slavko Perović, Montenegrin politician
- Slavko Šlander, Slovenian war hero
- Slavko Štancer, Croatian general
- Slavko Vukšić, Croatian politician

== Sports ==
- Slavko Beda, Croatian football player
- Slavko Cicak, Montenegrin-Swedish chess player
- Slavko Goluža, Croatian handball player
- Slavko Ištvanić, Croatian football player
- Slavko Kodrnja, Croatian football player
- Slavko Lukić, Serbian football player
- Slavko Luštica, Croatian football player
- Slavko Marić, Bosnian Serb football player
- Slavko Matić, Serbian football player
- Slavko Obadov, Serbian judoka
- Slavko Pavletić, Croatian football player
- Slavko Perović (footballer), Serbian football player
- Slavko Petrović, Serbian football player
- Slavko Radovanović, Serbian football player
- Slavko Stefanović, Serbian basketball player
- Slavko Stojanović, Croatian football player
- Slavko Svinjarević, Serbian football player
- Slavko Šajber, Croatian football manager
- Slavko Šurdonja, Croatian football player
- Slavko Vraneš, Montenegrin basketball player
- Slavko Vučković, Serbian football player
- Slavko Zagorac, Bosnian Serb football player

== Writers and Journalists ==
- Slavko Ćuruvija, Serbian journalist
- Slavko Fras, Slovenian journalist
- Slavko Goldstein, Croatian writer
- Slavko Janevski, Macedonian writer
- Slavko Pregl, Slovenian writer

== Others ==
- Slavko Hirsch, Croatian physician
- Slavko Kremenšek, Slovene historian
- Slavko Kulić, Croatian economist
- Slavko Löwy, Croatian architect
- Slavko Milosavlevski, Macedonian sociologist
- Slavko Wolf, Croatian Jewish lawyer
- Slavko Ziherl, Slovenian psychiatrist

== See also ==
- Slavkovići
- Slavkovica
