= Vučković =

Vučković (Cyrillic script: Вучковић), also spelled Vuckovic when diacritics are lost or Vuchkovich when transcribed, is a South Slavic patronymic surname derived from the name Vučko, "wolf cub".

The surname may refer to:

- Aljoša Vučković, Serbian actor
- Bojan Vučković, Serbian chess Grandmaster
- Bojan Vučković, Serbian footballer
- Gene Vuckovich, American politician
- Jelena Vučković, Serbian-American scientist
- Lidija Vučković, Serbian basketball player
- Marko Vuckovic, American footballer
- Nebojša Vučković, Serbian football manager
- Nenad Vučković (footballer), Croatian footballer
- Nenad Vučković (handballer), Serbian handball player
- Pete Vuckovic, British singer-songwriter
- Severina Kojić, née Vučković, Croatian pop singer and actor
- Slavko Vučković, Serbian footballer
- Stephan Vuckovic, German athlete who competes in triathlon
- Zdenka Vučković, Croatian pop singer

== See also ==
- Vuckovich
- Vučkovići (disambiguation)
