= Matthew Millar (soccer) =

Australian soccer player

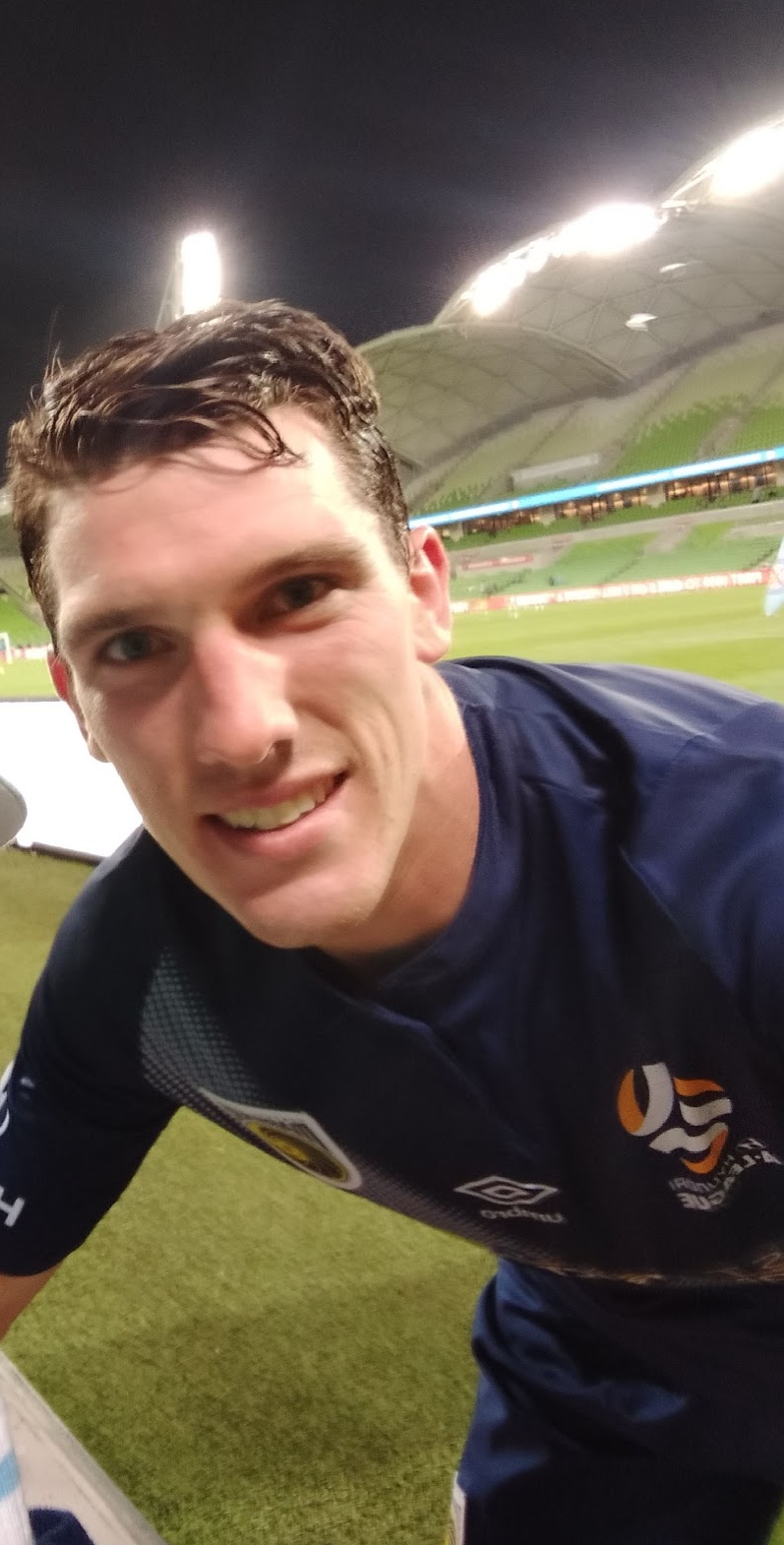
- Millar with Central Coast Mariners

Personal information
- Full name: Matthew George Millar
- Date of birth: 23 August 1996 (age 30)
- Place of birth: Melbourne, Australia
- Height: 1.86 m (6 ft 1 in)
- Positions: Right back; right midfielder

Team information
- Current team: Oakleigh Cannons
- Number: 6

Youth career
- Langwarrin SC
- 2015–2016: Melbourne City

Senior career*
Years	Team	Apps	(Gls)
2013–2014	Dandenong Thunder	34	(7)
2015–2016	Melbourne City NPL	22	(3)
2015–2016	Melbourne City	4	(0)
2016–2018	South Melbourne	65	(18)
2018–2019	Central Coast Mariners	24	(1)
2019–2021	Newcastle Jets	42	(4)
2020–2021	→ Shrewsbury Town (loan)	9	(1)
2021–2022	St Mirren	12	(0)
2022–2024	Macarthur FC	35	(10)
2024	Istiklol	8	(1)
2025	Havadar	12	(1)
2026–	Oakleigh Cannons	1	(0)
- * Club domestic league appearances and goals as of 19 June 2026

Matthew Millar is an Australian professional soccer player who plays as a right back for National Premier Leagues Victoria club Oakleigh Cannons.

Millar is from a family of ten children, eight of them male and two female. He played junior football at Langwarrin.

== Club career ==
=== Melbourne City ===
On 21 October 2015 he made his senior professional debut for Melbourne City in a 2015 FFA Cup match against Perth Glory. He made his A-League debut against Newcastle Jets off the bench.

=== South Melbourne ===
In February 2016, Millar left Melbourne City to return to the National Premier Leagues Victoria, signing for reigning premiers South Melbourne. On 19 May 2016, after 7 goals in 14 appearances, Millar extended his contract with South Melbourne until the end of the 2017 NPL Victoria season.

=== Central Coast Mariners ===
In July 2018, Millar returned to the A-League, signing a one-year contract with Central Coast Mariners. When Millar signed with rivals the Jets he was famously told to go home upon announcing his move at training.

=== Newcastle Jets ===
On 1 February 2019 it was announced Millar had signed for the Newcastle Jets for the 19-20 A-League season.

For his first season at Newcastle he started every game for the club, except the last 2 due to an injury. He played predominantly as a very attacking wing back and was their equal 2nd top goalscorer with 4 goals as well as 3 assists.

During the same season he received a NAB Young Player of the Year nomination in March. Riley McGree was the winner of the award for the season.

==== Shrewsbury Town (loan) ====
On 5 October 2020, Millar joined League One side Shrewsbury Town on a short-term loan deal until January 2021 with an option to buy. He scored his first goal for Shrewsbury on 10 November 2020 in an EFL Trophy group game against Crewe Alexandra. After the club were unable to agree a deal for a permanent transfer, Millar returned to Australia on 19 January 2021.

=== St Mirren ===
On 7 September 2021, Millar moved to Scotland to sign a 1-year contract for St Mirren in the Scottish Premiership.

=== Macarthur FC ===
After not being able to solidify a place in St Mirren’s starting 11, Millar returned to the A-League Men signing for Macarthur FC on a one-year deal. In May 2024, Millar was named in an alleged A-League bet-fixing scheme.

=== Istiklol ===
On 3 August 2024, Tajikistan Higher League club Istiklol announced the signing of Millar on a contract until the end of the 2024 season. Millar won the 2024 Tajikistan Higher League with the club and featured in the 2024–25 AFC Champions League Two. On 20 January 2025, Istiklol announced that they had decided not to renew their contract with Millar after it expired at the end of the 2024 season.

=== Havadar ===
In January 2025, Millar joined Persian Gulf Pro League side Havadar.

== Career statistics ==
As of match played 11 December 2024

Appearances and goals by club, season and competition
Club	Season	League			National Cup		League Cup		Continental		Other		Total	
Club	Season	Division	Apps	Goals	Apps	Goals	Apps	Goals	Apps	Goals	Apps	Goals	Apps	Goals
Dandenong Thunder	2013	Victorian Premier League	9	0	–		–		–		3 (Note: Appearances in Dockerty Cup)	0	12	0
Dandenong Thunder	2014	NPL Victoria	25	7	–		–		–		3	0	28	7
Dandenong Thunder	Total		34	7	–		–		–		6	0	40	7
Melbourne City Youth	2015	NPL Victoria 1	22	3	–		–		–		–		22	3
Melbourne City	2015–16	A-League	4	0	1	1	–		–		0	0	5	1
South Melbourne	2016	NPL Victoria	26	7	0	0	–		–		7 (Note: Three appearances and one goal in NPL Victoria finals; four appearances and three goals in Dockerty Cup)	4	33	11
South Melbourne	2017	NPL Victoria	25	9	4	2	–		–		6 (Note: One appearance in NPL Victoria finals; five appearances in Dockerty Cup)	0	35	11
South Melbourne	2018	NPL Victoria	14	2	0	0	–		–		1	0	15	2
South Melbourne	Total		65	18	4	2	–		–		14	4	83	24
Central Coast Mariners	2018–19	A-League	21	1	0	0	–		–		–		21	1
Newcastle Jets	2019–20	A-League	24	4	3	0	–		–		–		27	4
Newcastle Jets	2020–21	A-League	18	0	–		–		–		–		18	0
Newcastle Jets	Total		42	4	3	0	-	-	-	-	-	-	45	4
Shrewsbury Town (loan)	2020–21	League One	9	1	2	0	0	0	–		2 (Note: Appearance(s) in EFL Trophy)	1	13	2
St Mirren	2021–22	Scottish Premiership	12	0	0	0	0	0	-		-		12	0
Macarthur FC	2022–23	A-League Men	26	5	2	0	-		-		-		28	5
Macarthur FC	2023–24	A-League Men	8	5	2	0	-		5 (Note: Appearances and goals in the AFC Cup)	1	1 (Note: Appearances and goals in the A-League Men finals series)	0	16	6
Macarthur FC	Total		34	10	4	0	-	-	5	1	1	0	44	11
Istiklol	2024	Tajikistan Higher League	8	1	5	0	-		6 (Note: Appearances and goals in the AFC Champions League Two)	0	0 (Note: Appearances and goals in the Tajik Supercup)	0	19	1
Havadar	2024–25	Persian Gulf Pro League	5	0	0	0	–						5	0
Career total			256	45	19	3	0	0	10	1	23	5	309	54

== Honours ==
Macarthur

- Australia Cup: 2022

Istiklol

- Tajikistan Higher League: 2024
