= Vuckovich =

Vuckovich is a surname, a transcription of the surname Vučković. Notable people with the surname include:

- Gene Vuckovich (1936–2022), American politician from Montana
- Pete Vuckovich (born 1952), American baseball player
