= Vučkovići =

Vučkovići may refer to:

- Donji Vučkovići, a village in Croatia
- Donji Vučkovići, Polača, a hamlet of Polača, Šibenik-Knin County, Croatia
- Donji Vučkovići, Trnovac Glinski, a hamlet of Trnovac Glinski, Croatia
- Gornji Vučkovići a village in Croatia
- Gornji Vučkovići, Polača, a hamlet of Polača, Šibenik-Knin County, Croatia
- Gornji Vučkovići, Trnovac Glinski, a hamlet of Trnovac Glinski, Croatia
- Vučkovići, Donji Klasnić, a hamlet of Donji Klasnić, Croatia
- Vučkovići, Donji Skrad, a hamlet of Donji Skrad, Croatia
- Vučkovići, Dugopolje, a hamlet of Dugopolje, Croatia
- Vučkovići, Ervenik, a hamlet of Ervenik, Croatia
- Vučkovići, Gornja Bačuga, a hamlet of Gornja Bačuga, Croatia
- Vučkovići, Gregurovec, a hamlet of Gregurovec, Mihovljan, Croatia
- Vučkovići, Jurga, a hamlet of Jurga, Croatia
- Vučkovići, Kistanje, a hamlet of Kistanje, Croatia
- Vučkovići, Lapovac, a hamlet of Lapovac, Croatia
- Vučkovići, Maljkovo, a hamlet of Maljkovo, Croatia
- Vučkovići (Rastik), one name of a hamlet of Polača, Šibenik-Knin County, Croatia
- Vučkovići, Poznanovec, a hamlet of Poznanovec, Croatia
- Vučkovići, Rajić Brdo, a hamlet of Rajić Brdo, Croatia
- Vučkovići, Sinj a former hamlet and now city quarter of Sinj, Croatia
- Vučkovići, Stojmerić, a hamlet of Stojmerić, Croatia
- Vučkovići, Velika Crkvina, a hamlet of Velika Crkvina, Croatia
- Vučkovići, Vrpolje, a hamlet of Vrpolje, Knin, Croatia

== See also ==
- Vučković, a surname
