= Ivan Novoselec =

Croatian footballer (born 1995)

Personal information
- Full name: Ivan Novoselec
- Date of birth: 19 June 1995 (age 31)
- Place of birth: Varaždin, Croatia
- Height: 1.85 m (6 ft 1 in)
- Position: Centre-back

Team information
- Current team: Posušje
- Number: 33

Youth career
- Varaždin

Senior career*
Years	Team	Apps	(Gls)
2014–2015	Zavrč	28	(1)
2015–2016	Lokomotiva		
2016	Lucko	9	(1)
2016	Lokomotiva		
2016–2017	Varaždin		
2017	Varteks		
2017–2018	Sracinec		
2018–2019	Varteks		
2019–2020	Međimurje	29	(6)
2020–2021	Varaždin	10	(1)
2021–2022	Koper	26	(2)
2022	Varaždin		
2022–2023	Koper	24	(2)
2023–2024	Istiklol	16	(4)
2024–2025	Punjab	20	(1)
2026–	Posušje	1	(0)
- * Club domestic league appearances and goals as of 12 June 2026

Ivan Novosolec (born 19 June 1995) is a Croatian professional footballer who plays as a defender for Posušje.

== Career ==
On 15 July 2023, Tajikistan Higher League club Istiklol announced the singing of Novoselec. On 12 July 2024, Istiklol announced the departure of Novoselec at the end of his contract.

On 4 August 2024, Punjab FC announced the signing of Novosolec.

== Career statistics ==
As of match played 4 April 2026

Club	Season	League			National cup (Note: Includes Slovenian Cup, Tajik Cup, Indian Super Cup)		Continental		Other		Total	
Club	Season	Division	Apps	Goals	Apps	Goals	Apps	Goals	Apps	Goals	Apps	Goals
Varaždin	2019–20	Croatian Football League	12	0	0	0	–		–		12	0
Varaždin	2020–21	Croatian Football League	10	1	0	0	–		–		10	1
Varaždin	Total		22	1	0	0	–		–		22	1
Koper	2021–22	Slovenian PrvaLiga	26	2	4	0	–		–		30	2
Koper	2022–23	Slovenian PrvaLiga	24	2	2	0	2 (Note: Appearances in UEFA Conference League)	0	–		28	2
Koper	Total		50	4	6	0	2	0	–		58	4
Istiklol	2023	Tajikistan Higher League	8	1	5	0	6 (Note: Appearances in AFC Champions League)	0	–		19	1
Istiklol	2024	Tajikistan Higher League	8	3	0	0	0	0	1 (Note: Appearance in Tajik Supercup)	0	9	3
Istiklol	Total		16	4	5	0	6	0	1	0	28	4
Punjab	2024–25	Indian Super League	20	1	1	0	–		–		21	1
Posušje	2025–26	Premier League of Bosnia and Herzegovina	1	0	–		–		–		1	0
Career total			109	10	12	0	8	0	1	0	130	10

== Honours ==
Istiklol

- Tajikistan Higher League: 2023
- Tajikistan Cup: 2023
- Tajik Super Cup: 2024
