= Mukhriddin Khasanov =

Tajik footballer

Personal information
- Full name: Mukhriddin Khasanov
- Date of birth: 23 September 2002 (age 24)
- Place of birth: Tajikistan
- Height: 1.94 m (6 ft 4 in)
- Position: Goalkeeper

Team information
- Current team: Istiklol
- Number: 99

Senior career*
Years	Team	Apps	(Gls)
–2020	Parvoz		
2020	Khujand		
2021–	Istiklol	47	(0)

International career^{‡}
2022–	Tajikistan	3	(0)
- * Club domestic league appearances and goals as of 12:21, 16 November 2026 (UTC) ‡ National team caps and goals as of 10:02, 4 December 2024 (UTC)

Mukhriddin Khasanov (Tajik: Мухриддин Хасанов, Russian: ‌Мухриддин Хасанов, born 23 September 2002) is a Tajik professional footballer who plays as a goalkeeper for Istiklol.

== Career ==
=== Club ===
In February 2021, Khasanov joined Istiklol on trial, signing for the club permanently on 29 March 2021.

=== International ===
Khasanov made his senior team debut on 1 June 2022 in a 1–0 defeat against Syria, coming on as a second-half substitute for Rustam Yatimov.

== Career statistics ==
=== Club ===
As of match played 7 November 2026

Club	Season	League			National Cup		Continental		Other		Total	
Club	Season	Division	Apps	Goals	Apps	Goals	Apps	Goals	Apps	Goals	Apps	Goals
Istiklol	2021	Tajikistan Higher League	14	0	1	0	1 (Note: Appearances in the AFC Champions League)	0	0 (Note: Appearances in the Tajik Supercup)	0	16	0
Istiklol	2022	Tajikistan Higher League	5	0	0	0	2	0	0	0	7	0
Istiklol	2023	Tajikistan Higher League	4	0	0	0	0	0	0	0	4	0
Istiklol	2024	Tajikistan Higher League	10	0	4	0	3 (Note: Appearances in the AFC Champions League Two)	0	0	0	17	0
Istiklol	2025	Tajikistan Higher League	10	0	0	0	0	0	0	0	10	0
Istiklol	2026	Tajikistan Higher League	4	0	0	0	0 (Note: Appearances in the AFC Challenge League)	0	0	0	4	0
Istiklol	Total		47	0	5	0	6	0	0	0	58	0
Career total			47	0	5	0	6	0	0	0	58	0

=== International ===
Tajikistan national team
Year	Apps	Goals
2022	1	0
2023	0	0
2024	2	0
Total	3	0

Statistics accurate as of match played 19 November 2024

== Honors ==
Istiklol

- Tajikistan Higher League (3): 2021, 2022, 2023
- Tajikistan Cup (1): 2023
- Tajik Supercup (3): 2021, 2022, 2024

Tajikistan

- King's Cup: 2022
