= Dženis Beganović =

Bosnian footballer

Personal information
- Date of birth: 23 March 1996 (age 30)
- Place of birth: Sarajevo, Bosnia and Herzegovina
- Height: 1.85 m (6 ft 1 in)
- Position: Forward

Youth career
- 2006–2014: Željezničar

Senior career*
Years	Team	Apps	(Gls)
2014–2017	Željezničar	40	(5)
2017	→ Metalleghe-BSI (loan)	13	(0)
2018	Kom	14	(2)
2018–2019	Znojmo	21	(1)
2019–2020	Tuzla City	11	(1)
2020–2022	Sloboda Tuzla	58	(11)
2022–2023	Željezničar	30	(0)
2023–2024	Istiklol	19	(1)
2025	Istiklol	0	(0)

International career
2014–2015	Bosnia and Herzegovina U19	6	(0)
2017–2018	Bosnia and Herzegovina U21	2	(1)
- * Club domestic league appearances and goals as of 10:00, 28 January 2025 (UTC)

Dženis Beganović (born 23 March 1996) is a former Bosnian professional footballer who plays as a forward.

== Club career ==
=== Željezničar ===
Born in Sarajevo, Beganović started off his career in the youth team of hometown club Željezničar in 2006. In 2014, he debuted for the first team of Željezničar as an 18 year old.

On 16 July 2015, in a 2015–16 UEFA Europa League second qualifying round match against Ferencvárosi, Beganović scored in the 90th minute for Željezničar (Željezničar won 1–0 in Hungary, while in Sarajevo, they won 2–0 and qualified for the third round), securing them qualification to the third qualifying round.

In January 2017, Beganović was loaned out to Metalleghe-BSI for the remainder of the 2016–17 Bosnian Premier League season.

On 18 December 2017, after 3 years playing for the club, he left Željezničar.

=== Kom ===
On 21 February 2018, Beganović signed with Montenegrin First League club Kom. On 7 June 2018, not even four months after joining Kom, he left the club.

=== Znojmo ===
One month after leaving Kom, in July 2018, Beganović joined Czech 2. Liga club Znojmo. He made his league debut for Znojmo on 29 July 2018 against Hradec Králové in a 2–1 away loss.

He scored his first goal for Znojmo on 12 April 2019, in a 1–1 home league draw against Vlašim.

=== Tuzla City ===
On 28 June 2019, after two years Beganović came back to Bosnia and Herzegovina and signed a three-year contract with Tuzla City. He made his official debut for Tuzla City on 10 August 2019, in a 0–1 away league win against Mladost Doboj Kakanj. Beganović scored his first goal for Tuzla City in a 1–0 home league win against Čelik Zenica on 23 November 2019.

=== Sloboda Tuzla ===
On 19 August 2020, Beganović signed a contract with Tuzla City's city rivals Sloboda. He made his official debut for Sloboda in a league loss against Zrinjski Mostar on 22 August 2020. Beganović scored his first goal for the club on 29 August 2020, in a league win against Široki Brijeg.

=== Return to Željezničar ===
On 21 June 2022, Beganović returned to Željezničar. He made his second debut for the club on 16 July 2022, in a 1–1 home draw against Leotar. On 19 October 2022, he scored his first goal in the 2022–23 season in a Bosnian Cup game against Budućnost Banovići.

Beganović left Željezničar after his contract with the club expired in June 2023.

=== Istiklol ===
On 13 July 2023, Tajikistan Higher League club Istiklol announced the signing of Beganović. On 12 July 2024, Istiklol announced the departure of Beganović after his contract with the club had expired.

On 27 January 2025, Istiklol announced the return of Beganović to a one-year contract. In July 2025, Beganović announced his retirement from football after a routine medical scan revealed an enlarged and scared heart.

== International career ==
Beganović played for both the Bosnia and Herzegovina U19 and U21 national teams.

== Career statistics ==
=== Club ===
As of match played 26 June 2024.

Club	Season	League	League		Cup		Continental		Other		Total	
Club	Season	League	Apps	Goals	Apps	Goals	Apps	Goals	Apps	Goals	Apps	Goals
Željezničar	2014–15	Bosnian Premier League	8	4	—		—		—		8	4
Željezničar	2015–16	Bosnian Premier League	19	1	3	1	6	1	—		28	3
Željezničar	2016–17	Bosnian Premier League	9	0	2	2	—		—		11	2
Željezničar	Total		36	5	5	3	6	1	-	-	47	9
Metalleghe-BSI (loan)	2016–17	Bosnian Premier League	13	0	—		—		—		13	0
Željezničar	2017–18	Bosnian Premier League	4	0	1	0	2	0	—		7	0
Kom	2017–18	Montenegrin First League	14	2	2	0	—		—		16	2
Znojmo	2018–19	Czech 2. Liga	21	1	—		—		—		21	1
Tuzla City	2019–20	Bosnian Premier League	9	1	1	0	—		—		10	1
Tuzla City	2020–21	Bosnian Premier League	2	0	—		—		—		2	0
Tuzla City	Total		11	1	1	0	—		—		12	1
Sloboda Tuzla	2020–21	Bosnian Premier League	27	5	0	0	—		—		27	5
Sloboda Tuzla	2021–22	Bosnian Premier League	31	6	4	0	—		—		35	6
Sloboda Tuzla	Total		58	11	4	0	—		—		62	11
Željezničar	2022–23	Bosnian Premier League	30	0	3	2	—		—		33	2
Istiklol	2023	Tajikistan Higher League	8	0	5	2	6 (Note: Appearances in the AFC Champions League)	0	0 (Note: Appearances in the Tajik Supercup)	0	19	2
Istiklol	2024	Tajikistan Higher League	11	1	0	0	0 (Note: Appearances in the AFC Champions League Two)	0	1	0	12	1
Istiklol	Total		19	1	5	2	6	0	1	0	31	3
Career total			205	21	21	7	14	1	1	0	241	29

== Honours ==
Istiklol

- Tajikistan Higher League: 2023
- Tajikistan Cup: 2023
- Tajik Supercup: 2024
