= Amirbek Juraboev =

Tajik footballer (born 1996)

Personal information
- Date of birth: 13 April 1996 (age 30)
- Place of birth: Dushanbe, Tajikistan
- Height: 1.79 m (5 ft 10 1/2 in)
- Position: Midfielder

Team information
- Current team: Istiklol
- Number: 6

Senior career*
Years	Team	Apps	(Gls)
2013–2014	CSKA-2 Moscow		
2014	Khayr Vahdat	15	(0)
2015	Shakhtyor Soligorsk	0	(0)
2016	Barki Tajik		
2016–2019	Istiklol	57	(4)
2019–2020	Navbahor Namangan	15	(0)
2020–2022	Istiklol	27	(1)
2022	United City	13	(2)
2023	Kedah Darul Aman	23	(6)
2024–	Istiklol	37	(6)

International career^{‡}
2014–	Tajikistan	59	(1)
- * Club domestic league appearances and goals as of 10:04, 9 March 2026 (UTC) ‡ National team caps and goals as of 10:54, 21 November 2024 (UTC)

Amirbek Juraboev (Tajik: ‌Амирбек Журабоев; born 13 April 1996) is a Tajik professional footballer who plays as a midfielder for Istiklol and the Tajikistan national team.

== Club career ==
=== Khayr Vahdat ===
In July 2014, Juraboev signed for Khayr Vahdat.

=== Shakhtyor Soligorsk ===
On 24 February 2015, Juraboev joined Shakhtyor Soligorsk. After leaving Shakhtyor Soligorsk, Juraboev went on trial with Belshina Bobruisk, but did not earn a contract.

=== Barki Tajik ===
In January 2016, Juraboev signed for Barki Tajik.

=== Istiklol ===
In June 2016, Juraboev signed for FC Istiklol from Barki Tajik.

=== Navbahor Namangan ===
On 26 July 2019, Juraboev left Istiklol to join Uzbekistan club, Navbahor Namangan on a six-month contract.

=== Return to Istiklol ===
On 7 August 2020, Juraboev returned to FC Istiklol, signing a one-year contract with the club.

=== United City ===
On 10 March 2022, Juraboev moved to Philippines to join United City in the Philippines Football League.

=== Kedah Darul Aman ===
On 10 December 2022, Juraboev was officially signed by Malaysia Super League club, Kedah Darul Aman for the 2023 Malaysia Super League.

=== Second return to Istiklol ===
On 18 March 2024, Istiklol announced the return of Juraboev on a contract until the end of 2025. On 25 January 2026, Istiklol announced that they had extended their contract with Juraboev until the end of the 2026 season.

== International career ==
Juraboev made his senior team debut on 7 June 2014 against Estonia.

Juraboev was called up to Tajikistan's squad for the 2023 AFC Asian Cup, but missed out on the tournament due to an ankle injury.

== Career statistics ==
=== Club ===
As of match played 7 March 2026

Club	Season	League			National Cup		Continental		Other		Total	
Club	Season	Division	Apps	Goals	Apps	Goals	Apps	Goals	Apps	Goals	Apps	Goals
Khayr Vahdat	2014	Tajik League	15	0			–		–		15	0
Shakhtyor Soligorsk	2015	Belarusian Premier League	0	0	0	0	-		-		0	0
Istiklol	2016	Tajik League	9	1	6	0	0	0	0	0	15	1
Istiklol	2017	Tajik League	19	1	5	2	9	0	1	0	34	3
Istiklol	2018	Tajik League	20	1	7	0	5	0	1	0	33	1
Istiklol	2019	Tajik League	9	1	0	0	6	0	1	0	16	1
Istiklol	Total		57	4	18	2	20	0	3	0	98	6
Navbahor Namangan	2019	Uzbekistan Super League	13	0	2	0	–		–		15	0
Navbahor Namangan	2020	Uzbekistan Super League	2	0	0	0	–		–		2	0
Navbahor Namangan	Total		15	0	2	0	0	0	0	0	17	0
Istiklol	2020	Tajikistan Higher League	7	0	0	0	0	0	0	0	7	0
Istiklol	2021	Tajikistan Higher League	20	1	5	0	1	0	0	0	26	1
Istiklol	Total		27	1	5	0	1	0	0	0	33	1
United City	2022	Philippines Football League	0	0	1	0	6	0	0	0	7	0
United City	Total		0	0	1	0	6	0	0	0	7	0
Kedah Darul Aman	2023	Malaysia Super League	23	6	0	0	–		0	0	23	6
Kedah Darul Aman	Total		23	6	0	0	0	0	0	0	23	6
Istiklol	2024	Tajikistan Higher League	18	1	5	2	6	0	1	0	30	3
Istiklol	2025	Tajikistan Higher League	18	5	2	0	6	3	1	0	27	8
Istiklol	2026	Tajikistan Higher League	1	0	0	0	0	0	0	0	1	0
Istiklol	Total		37	6	7	2	12	3	2	0	58	11
Career total			174	17	33	4	39	3	5	0	251	24

=== International ===
Tajikistan national team
Year	Apps	Goals
2014	1	0
2015	0	0
2016	7	0
2017	5	0
2018	7	0
2019	12	0
2020	3	0
2021	4	0
2022	7	0
2023	9	0
2024	4	1
Total	59	1

Statistics accurate as of match played 19 November 2024.

=== International goals ===
Scores and results list Tajikistan's goal tally first.

No.	Date	Venue	Opponent	Score	Result	Competition
1.	19 November 2024	Pamir Stadium, Dushanbe, Tajikistan	Afghanistan	1–0	3–1	Friendly

== Honors ==
Istiklol Source:

- Tajik League (6): 2016, 2017, 2018, 2019, 2020, 2021
- Tajik Cup (2): 2016, 2018
- Tajik Supercup (3): 2018, 2019, 2024

United City

- Copa Paulino Alcantara (1): 2022

Tajikistan

- King's Cup: 2022
- Merdeka Tournament: 2023
