= 2024 Tajik Super Cup =

- Event: Tajik Supercup
Istiklol	Ravshan Kulob
2	1
- Date: 11 May 2024
- Venue: TALCO Arena, Tursunzoda
- Man of the Match: Rustam Yatimov
- Referee: Nasim Khamidov
- Attendance: 7,500

The 2024 Tajik Supercup was the 15th Tajik Supercup, an annual Tajik football match played between the winners of the previous season's Tajikistan Higher League and Tajikistan Cup. The match was contested by 2023 League and Cup champions Istiklol, and the League and Cup runners-up Ravshan Kulob.

== Background ==
On 8 May, it was announced that the 2024 Tajik Super Cup would take place on 11 May at the TALCO Arena in Tursunzade, between the previous seasons League champions Istiklol, and leagues runners up Ravshan Kulob. It was also announced that Nasrullo Kabirov would referee the match with his assistants being Akmal Buriev and Khusravi Siddiqzod.

== Match ==
=== Summary ===
Istiklol took the lead in the 29th minute through Rustam Soirov, before Blessing Eleke doubled Istiklol's lead on the 69th minute. Musa Nurnazarov reduced the deficit in the 84th minute, with the match finishing 2–1 to Istiklol.

=== Details ===
11 May 2024
17:00 (UTC+5)

Istiklol	2–1	Ravshan Kulob
Soirov 27'; Eleke 69'	Report	Nurnazarov 84'

TALCO Arena, Tursunzoda
Attendance: 7,500
Referee: Nasrullo Kabirov

Istiklol	Ravshan Kulob

GK	1	(Tajikistan)	Rustam Yatimov
DF	3	(Tajikistan)	Tabrezi Davlatmir	Booked
DF	5	(Tajikistan)	Sodikjon Kurbonov		(substituted off) 67'
DF	33	(Croatia)	Ivan Novoselec
MF	6	(Tajikistan)	Amirbek Juraboev
MF	8	(Bosnia and Herzegovina)	Dženis Beganović	Booked
MF	10	(Tajikistan)	Alisher Dzhalilov
MF	13	(Tajikistan)	Amadoni Kamolov		(substituted off) 89'
MF	17	(Tajikistan)	Ehson Panjshanbe	Booked
FW	9	(Nigeria)	Blessing Eleke	Booked	(substituted off) 78'
FW	77	(Tajikistan)	Rustam Soirov		(substituted off) 78'
Substitutes:
GK	99	(Tajikistan)	Mukhriddin Khasanov
GK	16	(Tajikistan)	Olimjon Juraev
DF	4	(Serbia)	Slavko Lukić		(substituted in) 89'
MF	11	(Tajikistan)	Shervoni Mabatshoev		(substituted in) 78'
DF	19	(Tajikistan)	Akhtam Nazarov	Booked	(substituted in) 67'
MF	22	(Tajikistan)	Kabir Salimshoev
DF	23	(Tajikistan)	Alidzhon Karomatullozoda
DF	28	(Japan)	Keita Suzuki
FW	63	(Tajikistan)	Manuchekhr Dzhalilov		(substituted in) 78'
FW	72	(Tajikistan)	Mekhron Madaminov
MF	80	(Brazil)	Murilo Souza
Manager:
(Serbia) Nikola Lazarevic

GK	55	(Ukraine)	Yevhen Hrytsenko
DF	13	(Tajikistan)	Rakhmatsho Rakhmatzoda
DF	14	(Tajikistan)	Bakhtovari Khurshed		(substituted off) 69'
DF	15	(Ghana)	Samuel Ofori
DF	22	(Tajikistan)	Kholmurod Nazarov	Booked
MF	11	(Tajikistan)	Mukhammadzhon Rakhimov
MF	20	(Tajikistan)	Nozim Babadjanov	Booked
MF	23	(Tajikistan)	Azizbek Khaitov
MF	63	(Tajikistan)	Shodijon Murodov	Booked	(substituted off) 69'
MF	88	(Ukraine)	Yuriy Batyushyn		(substituted off) 86'
FW	17	(Tajikistan)	Bakhtiyor Zaripov		(substituted off) 75'
Substitutes:
GK	88	(Tajikistan)	Mukhammadrabi Rakhmatulloev
DF	2	(Ukraine)	Dmytriy Pavlish
DF	5	(Tajikistan)	Saidkhoni Amrokhon
MF	7	(Tajikistan)	Dzhamshed Murodov
FW	10	(Tajikistan)	Azizbek Sultonov		(substituted in) 86'
DF	23	(Tajikistan)	Muhammajon Naskov		(substituted in) 69'
FW	31	(Tajikistan)	Masrur Kiyomidinov
FW	65	(Turkmenistan)	Musa Nurnazarov		(substituted in) 69'
DF	70	(Tajikistan)	Mukhammad Mukhammadzoda
MF	74	(Tajikistan)	Sorbon Giyosov
MF	77	(Tajikistan)	Khurshed Abdulloev		(substituted in) 75'
Manager:
(Tajikistan) Rustam Khojayev

Man of the Match:Rustam Yatimov
Assistant referees:
Akmal Buriev (Tursunzade)
Khusravi Siddiqzod (Dushanbe)
Fourth official:
Rustam Nurmatov (Dushanbe)

Match rules

- 90 minutes
- Penalty shoot-out if scores level
- Seven named substitutes
- Maximum of six substitutions

== See also ==
- 2023 Tajikistan Higher League
- 2023 Tajikistan Cup
