= Yousef Abu Al-Jazar =

Jordanian footballer

Personal information
- Full name: Yousef Mohammad Salem Abu Al-Jazar
- Date of birth: 25 October 1999 (age 27)
- Place of birth: Ar-Ramtha, Jordan
- Height: 1.88 m (6 ft 2 in)
- Positions: Center-back; right back; defensive midfielder

Team information
- Current team: Al-Hussein (on loan from Kazma)
- Number: 23

Youth career
- –2020: Al-Ramtha

Senior career*
Years	Team	Apps	(Gls)
2020–2023	Al-Ramtha		
2023–2025	Al-Wehdat		
2025–	Kazma		
2026–	→Al-Hussein (loan)	12	(2)

International career^{‡}
2021–2023	Jordan U23		
2019–	Jordan	9	(0)
- * Club domestic league appearances and goals as of 8 May 2026 ‡ National team caps and goals as of 10 October 2025

Yousef Mohammad Salem Abu Al-Jazar (Arabic: يُوسُف مُحَمَّد سَالِم أَبُو الْجَزَر, born 25 October 1999) is a Jordanian footballer who plays as a defender and defensive midfielder for Jordanian Pro League club Al-Hussein, on loan from Kazma. He is also a Jordan national team player.

== Club career ==
=== Al-Ramtha ===
Born in Ar-Ramtha, Abu Al-Jazar started his professional career at his local club Al-Ramtha. Abu Al-Jazar was diagnosed with COVID-19 on 22 April 2021, a blow for the club as he was considered as one of the more important players in Al-Ramtha's ranks, where he excelled in the past season.

On 12 April 2022, Abu Al-Jazar suffered a cut to the forehead from an accidental head collision during a match against Al-Faisaly, which temporarily hospitalized him.

=== Al-Wehdat ===
On 14 January 2023, Al-Wehdat started to show interest in signing Abu Al-Jazar on a free transfer, after his contract expired.

== International career ==
Abu Al-Jazar is a former youth international for Jordan, having first represented the Jordanian under-23 team. He was a part of the Jordan U23 squad that won the 2021 WAFF U-23 Championship in Saudi Arabia.

Abu Al-Jazar received a call-up to the Jordan national football team on 7 July, as a part of a training camp held in Turkey.

He then got called up on 30 August 2024, to take part in the 2026 FIFA World Cup qualification process.

== Playing style ==
Abu Al-Jazar is capable of playing as a defensive midfielder, as well as a center-back and as a right-back.

== International career statistics ==
As of 5 February 2021

Jordan national team
Year	Apps	Goals
2019	2	0
2020	0	0
2021	1	0
2022	0	0
2023	0	0
2024	0	0
Total	3	0
