= Murilo Souza =

Brazilian footballer

Personal information
- Full name: Murilo de Souza Felisberto
- Date of birth: 17 May 1996 (age 30)
- Place of birth: Turvo, Brazil
- Height: 1.87 m (6 ft 2 in)
- Position: Defensive midfielder

Youth career
- 2008–2012: Grêmio
- 2012–2015: Cruzeiro

Senior career*
| Years | Team | Apps | (Gls) |
| 2015–2016 | Sporting CP B | 0 | (0) |
| 2016–2017 | Internacional B | 0 | (0) |
| 2018 | ABC | 3 | (0) |
| 2019 | Lagarto | 11 | (0) |
| 2020 | River | 0 | (0) |
| 2021 | Lagarto | 10 | (0) |
| 2021 | Igrejinha | 2 | (0) |
| 2021–2022 | Hetten | 24 | (3) |
| 2022–2023 | Budaiya Club | 19 | (1) |
| 2023 | Lviv | 1 | (0) |
| 2023–2024 | Al-Anwar | 0 | (0) |
| 2024 | Istiklol | 18 | (1) |
| 2025–2026 | Southern | 20 | (0) |
- * Club domestic league appearances and goals as of 16 May 2026

Murilo de Souza Felisberto (born 17 May 1996), known simply as Murilo Souza, is a Brazilian professional footballer who plays as a defensive midfielder.

== Club career ==
=== Lviv ===
On 25 February 2023, Souza signed a contract with the Ukrainian Premier League club Lviv.

=== Istiklol ===
On 19 March 2024, Tajikistan Higher League club Istiklol announced the signing of Souza on a contract until the end of the season. On 21 January 2025, Istiklol announced that Souza had left the club when his contract had expired at the end of 2024.

=== Southern ===
On 6 July 2025, Souza joined Hong Kong Premier League club Southern.
