= Keita Suzuki (footballer, born 1997) =

Japanese footballer (born 1997)

Personal information
- Date of birth: 20 December 1997 (age 28)
- Place of birth: Yokohama, Japan
- Height: 1.72 m (5 ft 8 in)
- Positions: Defender; midfielder

Youth career
- 2013–2015: Momoyama Gakuin High School

Senior career*
Years	Team	Apps	(Gls)
–2017	Ibar		
2017	Berane		
2018–2021	Podgorica	73 (Note: Montenegrin First League appearances only.)	(2)
2022–2023	Daegu	53	(2)
2024	Istiklol	13	(1)
- * Club domestic league appearances and goals as of 20 January 2025

Keita Suzuki (Japanese: 鈴木 圭太; born 20 December 1997) is a Japanese professional footballer who plays as a defender or midfielder, most recently for Tajikistan Higher League club Istiklol.

== Career ==
Before the second half of 2017–18, Suzuki signed for Montenegrin second tier side Podgorica, helping them earn promotion to the Montenegrin top flight. Before the 2022 season, he signed for Daegu FC in the South Korean top flight. On 19 February 2022, he debuted for Daegu FC during a 2–0 loss to FC Seoul.

On 20 March 2024, Tajikistan Higher League club Istiklol announced the signing of Suzuki on a contract until the end of the season. On 20 January 2025, Istiklol announced that they had decided not to renew their contract with Suzuki after it expired at the end of the 2024 season.

== Career statistics ==
=== Club ===
As of match played 30 November 2024

Club	Season	League			National Cup		League Cup		Continental		Other		Total	
Club	Season	Division	Apps	Goals	Apps	Goals	Apps	Goals	Apps	Goals	Apps	Goals	Apps	Goals
Podgorica	2019–20	Montenegrin First League	28	2	2	0	-		-		-		30	2
Podgorica	2020–21	Montenegrin First League	29	0	1	0	-		-		-		30	0
Podgorica	2021–22	Montenegrin First League	16	0	1	0	-		2 (Note: Appearances and goals in the UEFA Europa Conference League)	0	-		19	0
Podgorica	Total		73	2	4	0	-	-	2	0	-	-	79	2
Daegu	2022	K League 1	27	0	2	0	-		6 (Note: Appearances and goals in the AFC Champions League)	0	-		35	0
Daegu	2023	K League 1	26	2	1	0	-		-		-		27	2
Daegu	Total		53	2	3	0	-	-	6	0	-	-	62	2
Istiklol	2024	Tajikistan Higher League	13	1	5	0	-		4 (Note: Appearances and goals in the AFC Champions League Two)	0	0 (Note: Appearances and goals in the Tajik Supercup)	0	22	1
Career total			139	5	12	0	0	0	13	0	0	0	163	5

== Honors ==
Istiklol

- Tajik Supercup: 2024
