= Francesco Margiotta =

Italian footballer (born 1993)

Personal information
- Date of birth: 15 July 1993 (age 33)
- Place of birth: Turin, Italy
- Height: 1.77 m (5 ft 10 in)
- Position: Forward

Team information
- Current team: Imperia
- Number: 21

Youth career
- –2012: Juventus

Senior career*
Years	Team	Apps	(Gls)
2012–2018	Juventus	0	(0)
2012–2013	→ Carrarese (loan)	7	(0)
2013–2014	→ Venezia (loan)	17	(4)
2014–2015	→ Monza (loan)	14	(3)
2015	→ Real Vicenza (loan)	13	(1)
2015–2016	→ Santarcangelo (loan)	31	(9)
2016–2018	→ Lausanne-Sport (loan)	36	(15)
2018–2019	Lausanne-Sport	35	(4)
2019–2020	Luzern	35	(11)
2020–2021	Chievo	31	(5)
2021–2022	Melbourne Victory	25	(4)
2022–2023	Latina	18	(2)
2023	→ Novara (loan)	11	(1)
2023–2024	Sestri Levante	17	(3)
2024	Botoșani	7	(1)
2024	Istiklol	9	(3)
2025	Rànger's	11	(8)
2025	Nardò	11	(1)
2025–2026	Chieti	15	(5)
2026–	Imperia	0	(0)

International career
2011	Italy U19	1	(0)
- * Club domestic league appearances and goals as of 10 November 2026

Francesco Margiotta (born 15 July 1993) is an Italian professional footballer who plays as a forward for Italian Serie D club Imperia.

== Career ==
Born in Turin, Piedmont, Margiotta started his career at Serie A side Juventus, signing a four-year contract in 2011. In 2012, he was loaned to Carrarese. In 2013, Margiotta was loaned to Venezia. He also signed a new three-year contract with Juventus in 2013. In 2014, Margiotta was signed by Monza. In January 2015, Margiotta was loaned to Real Vicenza. In 2015 Margiotta moved to Santarcangelo on loan.

In June 2016, he moved to newly-promoted Swiss first division club Lausanne-Sport on an 18-month loan. The loan was made permanent on 31 January 2018 for €1 million. In June 2019 he signed for FC Luzern; he left the club in October 2020 after 13 goals in 39 games. Margiotta then joined ChievoVerona later that month.

After the exclusion of Chievo, Margiotta signed for A-League side Melbourne Victory at the start of the 2021–22 season. In August 2022, he returned to Italy, signing for Latina in the Serie C. On 31 January 2023, Margiotta was loaned to Novara, with an option to buy.

=== Istiklol ===
On 3 August 2024, Tajikistan Higher League club Istiklol announced the signing of Margiotta on a one-year contract. On 14 January 2025, Istiklol announced their contract with Margiotta had expired and that he had left the club.

=== Rànger's ===
On 15 February 2025, Primera Divisió club Rànger's announced the signing of Margiotta.

=== Nardò ===
On 9 September 2025, Serie D club Nardò announced the signing of Margiotta.

=== Chieti ===
On 19 December 2025, Serie D club Chieti announced the signing of Margiotta.

== Career statistics ==
=== Club ===
As of match played 13 March 2025

Club	Season	League			National Cup		League Cup		Continental		Other		Total	
Club	Season	Division	Apps	Goals	Apps	Goals	Apps	Goals	Apps	Goals	Apps	Goals	Apps	Goals
Juventus	2012–13	Serie A	0	0	0	0	-		0 (Note: Appearances and goals in the UEFA Champions League)	0	0 (Note: Appearances and goals in the Supercoppa Italiana)	0	0	0
Juventus	2013–14	Serie A	0	0	0	0	-		0 (Note: Zero appearances and goals in the UEFA Champions League and UEFA Europa League)	0	0	0	0	0
Juventus	2014–15	Serie A	0	0	0	0	-		0	0	0	0	0	0
Juventus	2015–16	Serie A	0	0	0	0	-		0	0	0	0	0	0
Juventus	2016–17	Serie A	0	0	0	0	-		0	0	0	0	0	0
Juventus	2017–18	Serie A	0	0	0	0	-		0	0	0	0	0	0
Juventus	Total		0	0	0	0	-	-	0	0	0	0	0	0
Carrarese (loan)	2012–13	Serie C	7	0	2	0	-		-		-		9	0
Venezia (loan)	2013–14	Serie C	17	4	0	0	-		-		-		0	0
Monza (loan)	2014–15	Serie C	14	3	1	0	-		-		-		15	3
Real Vicenza	2014–15	Serie C	13	1	0	0	-		-		-		13	1
Santarcangelo	2015–16	Serie C	31	9	0	0	-		-		-		31	9
Lausanne-Sport (loan)	2016–17	Swiss Super League	18	8	0	0	-		-		-		18	8
Lausanne-Sport (loan)	2017–18	Swiss Super League	18	7	1	0	-		-		-		19	7
Lausanne-Sport (loan)	Total		36	15	1	0	-	-	-	-	-	-	37	15
Lausanne-Sport	2017–18	Swiss Super League	16	1	0	0	-		-		-		16	1
Lausanne-Sport	2018–19	Swiss Challenge League	19	3	1	0	-		-		-		20	3
Lausanne-Sport	Total		35	4	1	0	-	-	-	-	-	-	36	4
Luzern	2019–20	Swiss Super League	35	11	3	2	-		4 (Note: Appearances and goals in the UEFA Europa League)	0	-		42	13
Luzern	2020–21	Swiss Super League	0	0	1	0	-		-		-		1	0
Luzern	Total		35	11	4	2	-	-	4	0	-	-	43	13
ChievoVerona	2020–21	Serie B	31	5	0	0	-		-		-		31	5
Melbourne Victory	2021–22	A-League Men	25	4	6	1	-		0 (Note: Appearances and goals in the AFC Champions League)	0	-		31	5
Latina	2022–23	Serie C	18	2	0	0	-		-		-		18	2
Novara (loan)	2022–23	Serie C	11	1	0	0	-		-		-		11	1
Sestri Levante	2023–24	Serie C	17	3	0	0	-		-		-		17	3
Botoșani	2023–24	Liga I	7	1	0	0	-		-		0 (Note: Appearances and goals in the Promotion/relegation play-offs)	0	7	1
Istiklol	2024	Tajikistan Higher League	9	3	4	3	-		3 (Note: Appearances and goals in the AFC Champions League Two)	0	0 (Note: Appearances and goals in the Tajik Supercup)	0	16	6
Rànger's	2024–25	Primera Divisió	11	8	1	0	-		-		-		12	8
Career total			317	107	20	6	0	0	7	0	0	0	344	113

== Honours ==
Melbourne Victory

- FFA Cup: 2021
