= Masrur Kiyomidinov =

Tajikistani footballer

Personal information
- Full name: Masrur Mashkhurovich Kiyomidinov
- Date of birth: 21 January 2002 (age 24)
- Place of birth: Dushanbe, Tajikistan
- Position: Forward

Team information
- Current team: Ravshan Kulob
- Number: 31

Youth career
- 2017–2020: Dinamo Minsk

Senior career*
Years	Team	Apps	(Gls)
2021	Vitebsk	2	(0)
2022–2023	Naftan Novopolotsk	25	(1)
2023–	Ravshan Kulob		

International career
2017	Belarus U17		
- * Club domestic league appearances and goals as of 31 May 2023

Masrur Mashkhurovich Kiyomidinov (Russian: Масрур Машхурович Киёмидинов; born 21 January 2002) is a Tajik professional footballer who plays for Ravshan Kulob.

== International career ==
Kiyomidinov has been called up to Belarus national under-17 team in 2017 for a number of friendly matches and to Russia national under-17 team training camp in 2018, but has not made official match debut for either team.
