= Blessing Eleke =

Nigerian footballer (born 1996)

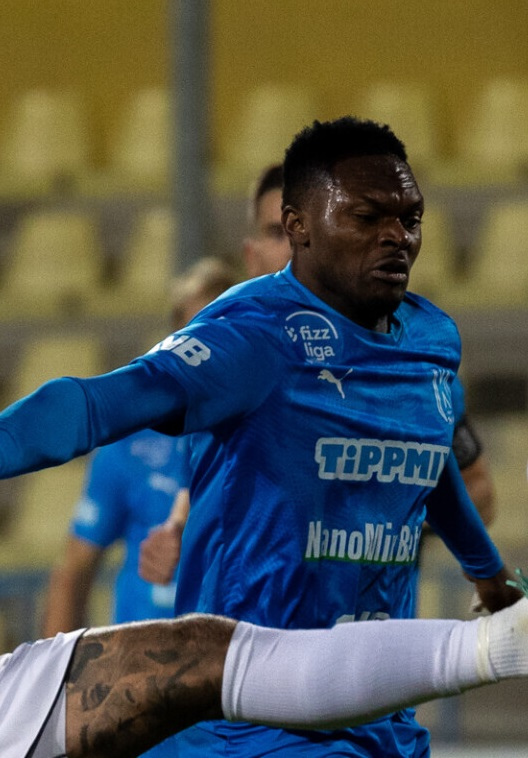
- Eleke playing for Kazincbarcika in 2025

Personal information
- Full name: Blessing Chibuike Eleke
- Date of birth: 5 March 1996 (age 30)
- Place of birth: Nigeria
- Height: 1.90 m (6 ft 3 in)
- Position: Striker

Youth career
- –2014: Flying Sports Academy
- 2014: Gorica

Senior career*
| Years | Team | Apps | (Gls) |
| 2014–2015 | Gorica | 37 | (15) |
| 2016–2017 | Olimpija Ljubljana | 43 | (10) |
| 2017–2018 | Ashdod | 27 | (4) |
| 2018–2020 | Luzern | 58 | (17) |
| 2020–2022 | Beerschot | 22 | (1) |
| 2021–2022 | → Gençlerbirligi SK (loan) | 24 | (7) |
| 2022–2023 | Kashima Antlers | 6 | (1) |
| 2024 | Istiklol | 10 | (6) |
| 2025 | Partizani Tirana | 10 | (3) |
| 2025 | Kazincbarcika | 6 | (0) |
| 2026 | Hamrun Spartans | 12 | (3) |
- * Club domestic league appearances and goals as of 27 May 2026

Blessing Eleke (born 5 March 1996) is a Nigerian professional footballer who plays as a striker, most recently for Maltese Premier League club Hamrun Spartans. He previously played for Gorica, Olimpija Ljubljana, Ashdod, Luzern, Beerschot, Gençlerbirligi, Kashima Antlers, Istiklol, Partizani Tirana and Kazincbarcika.

== Professional career ==
=== Early life and career ===
Eleke grew up in Lagos with his three brothers and four sisters. He started playing football at Flying Sports Academy in his home country, before having an unsuccessful trial at Serie A club Sassuolo. Later on, he admitted that the transition from Nigeria to Europe was a difficult task to handle at the beginning.

=== Slovenia ===
Eleke signed for Olimpija Ljubljana in January 2016 for a reported fee of €750,000. On 10 April 2016, in a league fixture versus Zavrč, Olimpija's manager Nikolić reportedly called Eleke a "black idiot", for elaborately celebrating an injury-time equalizer in an eventual 1–1 draw. Nikolić's contract was eventually terminated by mutual consent on 18 April 2016., although Eleke asked club president Milan Mandarić not to sack the manager. Eleke revealed that, although he considered leaving the club, he did not want to see his coach sacked, as he did not believe in eye for an eye.

=== Israel and Switzerland ===
In August 2017, Eleke transferred to Israeli Premier League club Ashdod for a reported fee of €800,000. On 27 July 2018, Eleke signed a four-year contract with Swiss Super League club FC Luzern for a reported fee of approximately 1 million Swiss francs. After being cleared to play for Luzern, he managed to score on his debut, helping his club get past Lugano 4–2.

=== Gençlerbirligi SK ===
On 1 September 2021, Eleke was loaned out to Turkish club Gençlerbirligi SK for the rest of the season.

=== Kashima Antlers ===
On 1 August 2022, Kashima Antlers confirmed an agreement with K Beerschot VA for him to join on a complete transfer, becoming one of the few Nigerian footballers to play in Japan. Eleke only made 6 appearances for the club over two seasons and was released from the club when his contract expired at the end of the 2023 season.

=== Istiklol ===
On 21 March 2024, Tajikistan Higher League club Istiklol announced the signing of Eleke to a one-year contract. On 20 April, Eleke scored a Hattrick for Istiklol in their 6-0 victory over Kuktosh Rudaki in the Tajikistan Higher League.

=== Partizani Tirana ===
On 23 January 2025, Partizani Tirana announced the signing of Eleke.

=== Kazincbarcika ===
On 10 September 2025, Nemzeti Bajnokság I club Kazincbarcikai SC announced the signing of Eleke. On 18 November 2025, Kazincbarcikai announced that Eleke had left the club.

=== Hamrun Spartans ===
On 4 February 2026, Maltese Premier League club Hamrun Spartans announced the signing of Eleke.

== Career statistics ==
=== Club ===
As of match played 15 May 2026

| Club | Season | League | | | National Cup | | League Cup | | Continental | | Other | | Total | |
| Club | Season | Division | Apps | Goals | Apps | Goals | Apps | Goals | Apps | Goals | Apps | Goals | Apps | Goals |
|---|---|---|---|---|---|---|---|---|---|---|---|---|---|---|
| Gorica | 2014–15 | Slovenian PrvaLiga | 17 | 3 | 0 | 0 | - | | - | | 2 (Note: Appearances and goals in the PrvaLiga play-off) | 0 | 19 | 3 |
| Gorica | 2015–16 | Slovenian PrvaLiga | 19 | 12 | 1 | 0 | - | | - | | - | | 20 | 12 |
| Gorica | Total | | 36 | 15 | 1 | 0 | - | - | - | - | 2 | 0 | 39 | 15 |
| Olimpija Ljubljana | 2015–16 | Slovenian PrvaLiga | 12 | 3 | 0 | 0 | - | | - | | - | | 12 | 3 |
| Olimpija Ljubljana | 2016–17 | Slovenian PrvaLiga | 30 | 5 | 5 | 1 | - | | 2 (Note: Appearances and goals in the UEFA Champions League) | 2 | - | | 37 | 7 |
| Olimpija Ljubljana | 2017–18 | Slovenian PrvaLiga | 3 | 2 | 0 | 0 | - | | 2 (Note: Appearances and goals in the UEFA Europa League) | 0 | - | | 5 | 2 |
| Olimpija Ljubljana | Total | | 45 | 10 | 5 | 1 | - | - | 4 | 2 | - | - | 54 | 12 |
| Ashdod | 2017–18 | Israeli Premier League | 27 | 4 | 4 | 2 | 0 | 0 | - | | - | | 31 | 6 |
| Luzern | 2018–19 | Swiss Super League | 32 | 13 | 4 | 2 | - | | 2 | 0 | - | | 38 | 15 |
| Luzern | 2019–20 | Swiss Super League | 26 | 4 | 2 | 1 | - | | 4 | 0 | - | | 32 | 5 |
| Luzern | Total | | 58 | 17 | 6 | 3 | - | - | 6 | 0 | - | - | 70 | 20 |
| Beerschot | 2020–21 | Belgian Pro League | 20 | 1 | 1 | 0 | - | | - | | - | | 21 | 1 |
| Beerschot | 2021–22 | Belgian Pro League | 2 | 0 | 0 | 0 | - | | - | | - | | 2 | 0 |
| Beerschot | Total | | 22 | 1 | 1 | 0 | - | - | - | - | - | - | 23 | 1 |
| Gençlerbirliği (loan) | 2021–22 | TFF First League | 24 | 7 | 0 | 0 | - | | - | | - | | 24 | 7 |
| Kashima Antlers | 2022 | J1 League | 4 | 1 | 0 | 0 | - | | - | | - | | 4 | 1 |
| Kashima Antlers | 2023 | J1 League | 2 | 0 | 0 | 0 | - | | - | | - | | 2 | 0 |
| Kashima Antlers | Total | | 6 | 1 | 0 | 0 | - | - | - | - | - | - | 6 | 1 |
| Istiklol | 2024 | Tajikistan Higher League | 10 | 6 | 0 | 0 | - | | 0 (Note: Appearances and goals in the AFC Champions League Two) | 0 | 1 (Note: Appearances and goals in the Tajik Supercup) | 1 | 11 | 7 |
| Partizani Tirana | 2024–25 | Kategoria Superiore | 10 | 3 | 2 | 0 | - | | - | | - | | 12 | 3 |
| Kazincbarcika | 2025–26 | Nemzeti Bajnokság I | 6 | 0 | 2 | 2 | - | | - | | - | | 8 | 2 |
| Hamrun Spartans | 2025–26 | Maltese Premier League | 12 | 3 | 1 | 0 | - | | - | | 1 (Note: Appearance in the Maltese Super Cup) | 0 | 14 | 3 |
| Career total | | | 256 | 67 | 22 | 8 | 0 | 0 | 10 | 2 | 4 | 1 | 292 | 78 |

== Honours ==
Olimpija Ljubljana

- PrvaLiga: 2015–16

Istiklol

- Tajik Supercup: 2024
