= Slavko Lukić =

Serbian footballer

Personal information
- Full name: Slavko Lukić
- Date of birth: 14 March 1989 (age 37)
- Place of birth: Smederevo, SFR Yugoslavia
- Height: 1.82 m (6 ft 0 in)
- Position: Right-back

Youth career
- 2004–2007: Red Star Belgrade

Senior career*
Years	Team	Apps	(Gls)
2007–2008	FK Morava Velika Plana	12	(1)
2009–2012	Smederevo	39	(0)
2011	→ Limhamn Bunkeflo (loan)	10	(1)
2012–2013	Novi Pazar	4	(0)
2013–2014	Smederevo	29	(5)
2014–2015	Sutjeska Nikšić	31	(2)
2015–2016	Teuta Durrës	15	(1)
2016	Flamurtari	5	(0)
2017	Spartak Trnava	11	(0)
2018	Nasaf	14	(2)
2018	Zemun	8	(1)
2019	Navbahor Namangan	12	(2)
2020	Zvijezda 09		
2020	Napredak Kruševac		
2021–2022	Kokand 1912	34	(0)
2023	Radnički Beograd	14	(2)
2023	Riteriai	6	(0)
2024	Istiklol	8	(0)
2025	Bengaluru		
2025	Samtse		
- * Club domestic league appearances and goals

Slavko Lukić (Serbian Cyrillic: Cлaвкo Лукић; born 14 March 1989) is a Serbian professional footballer who plays as a right-back.

== Club career ==
Lukić was a member of Red Star Belgrade's youth selections as well as the youth teams of Serbia and Montenegro before the split up in 2006. He made his senior debut with FK Morava Velika Plana, before moving to Smederevo. Smederevo sent him on a loan spell to Limhamn Bunkeflo, before he would be transferred to Novi Pazar in 2012.

On 26 March 2013 Lukić got into the center of the conversation about Smederevo's controversial 1–2 loss to Red Star Belgrade; he had tackled Red Star Belgrade's Cadú in the penalty box, and the referee subsequently awarded Red Star a penalty, bringing about allegations that the referee effectively aided Red Star's victory.

On 26 June 2013 it was reported that Lukić was almost killed in a road rage incident when an unidentified Peugeot tried to push Lukić's car off the highway; the occupants of the unidentified car managed to trap Lukić's car and proceeded to beat him with a metal pole on the stomach.

On 26 June 2014 it was announced that Lukić signed for FK Sutjeska Nikšić, who had won the Montenegrin First League at the end of the 2014 season. On 24 August 2015, Lukić left Sutjeska Nikšić to join Albanian Superliga club Teuta Durrës.

On 17 March, Istiklol announced the signing of Lukić.

In April 2025, Lukić was named in the starting line up for Samtse in their season opening match against Transport United.

== Career statistics ==
As of match played 26 June 2024

Club	Season	League			National Cup		League Cup		Continental		Other		Total	
Club	Season	Division	Apps	Goals	Apps	Goals	Apps	Goals	Apps	Goals	Apps	Goals	Apps	Goals
Smederevo	2009–10	Serbian SuperLiga	16	0	1	0	-						17	0
Smederevo	2010–11	Serbian SuperLiga	13	0	0	0	-						13	0
Smederevo	2011–12	Serbian SuperLiga	3	0	0	0	-						3	0
Smederevo	Total		32	0	1	0	-						33	1
Limhamn Bunkeflo (loan)	2011	Ettan	10	1			-						10	1
Novi Pazar	2012–13	Serbian SuperLiga	4	0	1	0	-						5	0
Smederevo	2013–14	Serbian First League	29	5	1	0	-						30	5
Sutjeska Nikšić	2014–15	Montenegrin First League	31	2	4	1	-		4 (Note: Two Appearances in the UEFA Champions League and two appearances in the UEFA Europa League)	0	-		39	3
Teuta Durrës	2015–16	Kategoria Superiore	30	2	5	2	-						35	4
Flamurtari	2016–17	Kategoria Superiore	5	0	0	0	-						5	0
Spartak Trnava	2017–18	Slovak First Football League	11	0	2	2	-						13	2
Nasaf	2018	Uzbekistan Super League	14	2	1	0	-		7 (Note: Appearances and goals in the AFC Champions League)	0	-		22	2
Zemun	2018–19	Serbian SuperLiga	8	1	1	0	-						9	1
Navbahor Namangan	2019	Uzbekistan Super League	12	2	0	0	-						12	2
Zvijezda 09	2019–20	Premier League of Bosnia and Herzegovina	1	0	0	0	-						1	0
Napredak Kruševac	2020–21	Serbian SuperLiga	2	0	2	0	-						4	0
Kokand 1912	2021	Uzbekistan Super League	16	1	1	0	-						17	1
Kokand 1912	2022	Uzbekistan Super League	18	0	3	0	-						21	0
Kokand 1912	Total		34	1	4	0	-						38	1
Radnički Beograd	2022–23	Serbian First League	14	2			-						14	2
Riteriai	2023	A Lyga	6	0	1	0	-						7	0
Istiklol	2024	Tajikistan Higher League	8	0	0	0	-		0 (Note: Appearances and goals in the AFC Champions League Two)	0	1 (Note: Appearances and goals in the Tajik Supercup)	0	9	0
Career total			251	18	23	5	-	-	11	0	1	0	286	23

== Honors ==
Istiklol

- Tajik Supercup: 2024
