= Slavko Vučković =

Serbian footballer

Personal information
- Full name: Slavko Vučković
- Date of birth: 5 August 1982 (age 44)
- Place of birth: SFR Yugoslavia
- Height: 1.85 m (6 ft 1 in)
- Position: Striker

Senior career*
Years	Team	Apps	(Gls)
2006–2007	Spartak Subotica		
2007–2008	Ararat Yerevan	2	(0)
- * Club domestic league appearances and goals as of 1 April 2007

Slavko Vučković (Serbian Cyrillic: Cлaвкo Bучкoвић, born 5 August 1982) is a Serbian retired footballer.

== External sources ==
- Profile at Armenian Federation site.
- Profile at FootballWorldsgame.
