= Nikola Lazarević =

Association football player

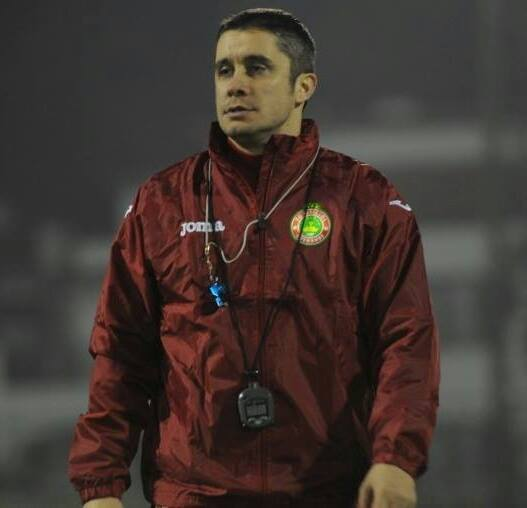
- Nikola at pre-season in Antalya

Personal information
- Full name: Nikola Lazarević
- Date of birth: 29 January 1978 (age 48)
- Place of birth: Niš, Yugoslavia

Managerial career
- Years: Team
- 2008–2009: Car Konstantin (assistant)
- 2009–2010: Radnički Niš (assistant)
- 2012–2013: Istiklol (assistant)
- 2013: Tajikistan (assistant)
- 2013–2014: Car Konstantin (assistant)
- 2014: FC Shenzhen Ruby (youth)
- 2015: Istiklol (assistant)
- 2015–2016: Tajikistan (assistant)
- 2016: Istiklol
- 2017: Cetinje
- 2018: BSU F.C.
- 2019-2020: Khujand
- 2021: Al Taawoun (assistant)
- 2021: Dinamo Samarqand (assistant)
- 2022: Qizilqum Zarafshon
- 2024: Istiklol
- 2024-2025: Qizilqum

Nikola Lazarević (Serbian Cyrillic: Никола Лазаревић; born 29 January 1978) is a Serbian football coach, UEFA Pro Licence holder, and current Head Coach of Qizilqum.

== Career ==
Lazarević started his coaching career at the age of 21.

Joining Car Konstantin as an Assistant coach in 2008, leaving in 2009 for a similar role at Radnički Niš until 2010.

In 2012 moved to Tajikistan, joining the coaching staff of FC Istiklol as an assistant coach on a one-year contract, before taking up a similar role with the Tajikistan national team in 2013.

Lazarević took his first head coaching role in the summer of 2013, moving back to Car Konstantin, coaching them for a year.

During 2014, Lazarević moved to China, coaching the Youth Team of Shenzhen Ruby (currently Shenzhen F.C.) until taking up his previously role as Assistant Coach of Istiklol in 2015, helping them to win the Tajik League, Tajik Cup and Tajik Supercup during the season. At the same year, Istiklol FC took a participation of AFC Cup and made historical achievement of Runner-Up.

After Lazarević's success with Istiklol, he returned to the Tajikistan National Team setup as an Assistant Coach. During this period, National Team took participation of 2018 World Cup qualifications. In the group stage, Tajikistan National Team took third place, after Australia National Team and Jordan National Team.

On 13 July 2016, Istiklol announced Lazarevic as their new manager, leaving the club at the end of the year after Istiklol announced the new club manager for the 2017 season.

After leaving Istiklol, Lazarevic was appointed as manager of FK Cetinje in 2017, leaving the position in the same year.

At the beginning of 2018, Lazarevic moved to China again, taking a part of China Football Federation project - BSU Football Club (participating at China League 1), working together with the former FC Barcelona president Joan Laporta and former Spanish coach Víctor Muñoz.

On 21 December 2019, Lazarevic was announced as the new head coach of FK Khujand. His achievement was 2020 AFC Cup group stage participation and Tajikistan Super Cup.

On 15 of December 2020, Lazarevic was announced as the new Sporting Director of Al-Nasr SC (Benghazi) from Libya, Champion of Libya 2020. During the period he spent at the position of Sporting Director he didn't he was out of Libya most of the time because of security reason.

At the beginning of March 2021 he got an offer to be a part of a coaching staff at Al Taawoun FC and on 11 of March Lazarevic officially became an assistant coach of Saudi Arabian club.

On 15 March 2024, Istiklol announced that Lazarevic had been appointed as their new head coach on a one-year contract.

On 26 December 2024, Qizilqum announced the return of Lazarević as their head coach. He left his position after 11 rounds in the current Super League season.

== Career statistics ==
=== Managerial ===
As of match played 8 September 2024, Only competitive matches are counted.

Managerial record by team and tenure
Team	From	To	Record								Ref
Team	From	To	P	W	D	L	GF	GA	GD	Win %	Ref
(Tajikistan) Istiklol	13 July 2016	31 December 2016	16	11	4	1	62	13	+49	68.75	
(Uzbekistan) Qizilqum Zarafshon	21 January 2022	31 December 2022	31	14	5	12	38	40	−2	45.16	
(Tajikistan) Istiklol	15 March 2024	15 September 2024	20	18	1	1	62	12	+50	90.00	
Total			67	43	10	14	162	65	+97	64.18	—

== Honours ==
=== Club ===
Istiklol

- Tajik League (1): 2016
- Tajik Cup (1): 2016
- Tajik Supercup (1): 2024
