= 2011 Tajik Super Cup =

2011 Tajik Supercup
- Event: Tajik Supercup
Istiklol	Regar-TadAZ
1	0
- Date: 2011
- Venue: Tsentralnyi Stadium, Qurghonteppa
- Referee: Orif Djuraev
- Attendance: 12,000

The 2011 Tajik Football Super Cup was the 2nd Tajik Supercup match, a football match which was contested between the 2010 League and Cup champions, Istiklol, and the League runners-up, Regar-TadAZ. It took place at Tsentralnyi Stadium, which seats about 12,000 spectators.

== Match details ==
2011
(UTC+5)

Istiklol	1–0 (a.e.t.)	Regar-TadAZ
Vasiev 113'	Report

Tsentralnyi Stadium, Qurghonteppa
Attendance: 12,000
Referee: Orif Djuraev

Istiklol	Regar-TadAZ

GK	(Uzbekistan) Farkhod Yuldoshev
DF	(Tajikistan) Eraj Rajabov
DF	(Tajikistan) Sokhib Suvonkulov
DF	(Tajikistan) Davron Ergashev
DF	(Tajikistan) Umed Khabibulloyev	Booked	(substituted off) 84'
MF	(Tajikistan) Nuriddin Davronov	Booked
MF	(Tajikistan) Fatkhullo Fatkhuloev		(substituted off) 66'
MF	(Tajikistan) Ibrahim Rabimov		(substituted off) 76'
FW	(Tajikistan) Farkhod Tokhirov		(substituted off) 55'
FW	(Tajikistan) Yusuf Rabiev
FW	(Tajikistan) Dilshod Vasiev
Substitutes:
DF	(Tajikistan) Jakhongir Jalilov	Booked	(substituted in) 55'
FW	(Tajikistan) Mahmadali Sodikov		(substituted in) 66'
MF	(Russia) Aleksandr Kudryashov	Booked	(substituted in) 76'
DF	(Russia) Ruslan Rafikov		(substituted in) 84'
Manager:
(Tajikistan) Alimzhon Rafikov Assistant referees: Fourth official:

GK
DF
DF
DF
MF
FW
FW
FW
Substitutes:
MF
Manager:
(Tajikistan)

(Tajikistan) Alisher Dodov
(Tajikistan) Rahmatullo Fuzailov	(substituted off) 59'
(Tajikistan) Hasan Rustamov
(Tajikistan) Daler Tukhtasunov
(Russia) Leonid Romanov	(substituted off) 53'
(Tajikistan) Shujoat Nematov
(Russia) Rustam Idrisov
(Tajikistan) Khurshed Makhmudov
(Tajikistan) Karimov
(Tajikistan) Khakimov
(Tajikistan) Bahodur Sharipov	(substituted off) 46'
(Tajikistan) Sukhrob Egamberdiev	(substituted in) 59'
(Tajikistan) Farhod Holbeck	(substituted in) 53' (substituted off) 76'
(Tajikistan) Khasanov	(substituted in) 76'
(Tajikistan) Abdukayum Karaboev	Booked	(substituted in) 46'

== See also ==
- 2010 Tajik League
- 2010 Tajik Cup
