= Tajik Supercup =

Tajik Super Cup Суперҷоми Тоҷикистон Superjomi Tojikiston
- Organiser(s): Tajikistan Football League Organization
- Founded: 2010; 16 years ago
- Region: Tajikistan
- Teams: 2
- Current champions: Regar-TadAZ Tursunzoda (1)
- Most championships: Istiklol (13 titles)
- Broadcaster: Varzish TV
- 2026 Tajik Super Cup

The Superjomi Tojikiston (Tajik: Суперҷоми Тоҷикистон; Russian: Суперкубок Таджикистана), or Tajik Super Cup, is a one-match football annual competition. The two participating clubs are holders of the Tajik League champions title and the Tajik Cup. If the Tajik League championship and the Tajik Cup are won by the same team, then the other participant is the runner-up of Tajik League. The match is played at the beginning of the season, typically in March.

== List of matches ==
Season	Winner	Score	Runner-up	Venue	Attendance
2010; Details	Istiklol; Winner of 2009 Tajik Cup	2 – 0	Vakhsh Qurghonteppa; Winner of 2009 Tajik League	Metallurg Stadium, Tursunzoda	5,000
2011; Details	Istiklol; Winner of 2010 Tajik League and 2010 Tajik Cup	1 – 0	Regar-TadAZ Tursunzoda; Runner-up of 2010 Tajik League	Tsentralnyi Stadium, Qurghonteppa	12,000
2012; Details	Istiklol; Winner of 2011 Tajik League	2 – 1	Regar-TadAZ Tursunzoda; Winner of 2011 Tajik Cup	Khair Stadium, Vahdat	
2013; Details	Ravshan Kulob; Winner of 2012 Tajik League	2 – 1	Regar-TadAZ Tursunzoda; Winner of 2012 Tajik Cup	Central Stadium, Kulob	15,000
2014; Details	Istiklol; Winner of 2013 Tajik Cup	5 – 0	Ravshan; Winner of 2013 Tajik League	Central Stadium, Kulob	18,000
2015; Details	Istiklol; Winner of 2014 Tajik League and 2014 Tajik Cup	2 – 2 (a.e.t.); 4 – 3 (p)	Khayr Vahdat	Pamir Stadium, Dushanbe	4,000
2016; Details	Istiklol; Winner of 2015 Tajik League and 2015 Tajik Cup	1 – 0	Khujand; Runner-up of 2015 Tajik League	TALCO Arena, Tursunzoda	4,000
2017; Details	Khosilot Farkhor; Runner-up of 2016 Tajik Cup	2 – 1	Istiklol; Winner of 2016 Tajik League and 2016 Tajik Cup	Central Stadium, Hisor	14,000
2018; Details	Istiklol; Winner of 2017 Tajik League	3 – 2	Khosilot Farkhor; Winner of 2017 Tajik Cup	Central Stadium, Hisor	5,436
2019; Details	Istiklol; Winner of 2018 Tajik League and 2018 Tajik Cup	3 – 0	Khujand; Runner-up of 2018 Tajik League	Pamir Stadium, Dushanbe	7,200
2020; Details	Istiklol; Winner of 2019 Tajikistan Higher League and 2019 Tajik Cup	2 – 1	Khujand; Runner-up of 2019 Tajikistan Higher League	Pamir Stadium, Dushanbe	0
2021; Details	Istiklol; Winner of 2020 Tajikistan Higher League	2 – 0	Ravshan; Winner of 2020 Tajikistan Cup	Central Stadium, Hisor	5,500
2022; Details	Istiklol; Winner of 2021 Tajikistan Higher League	1 – 0	Khujand; Winner of 2021 Tajikistan Cup	TALCO Arena, Tursunzoda	5,600
2023; Details	Ravshan Kulob; Winner of 2022 Tajikistan Cup	1 – 0	Istiklol; Winner of 2022 Tajikistan Higher League	Central Stadium, Hisor	9,200
2024; Details	Istiklol; Winner of 2023 Tajikistan Higher League	2 – 1	Ravshan Kulob; Runner-up of 2023 Tajikistan Higher League	TALCO Arena, Tursunzoda	7,500
2025; Details	Istiklol; Winner of 2024 Tajikistan Higher League	1 – 1 (a.e.t.); 5 – 4 (p)	Regar-TadAZ Tursunzoda; Winner of 2024 Tajik Cup	Hisor Central Stadium, Hisor	12,750
2026; Details	Regar-TadAZ Tursunzoda; Winner of 2025 Tajik Cup	2 – 1	Istiklol; Winner of 2025 Tajikistan Higher League	Hisor Central Stadium, Hisor	8,374

== Performance by club ==
Team	Years won	Runners-up
Istiklol	13 (2010, 2011, 2012, 2014, 2015, 2016, 2018, 2019, 2020, 2021, 2022, 2024, 2025)	3 (2017, 2023, 2026)
Ravshan Kulob	2 (2013, 2023)	3 (2014, 2021, 2024)
Khosilot Farkhor	1 (2017)	1 (2018)
Regar-TadAZ Tursunzoda	1 (2026)	4 (2011, 2012, 2013, 2025)
Khujand	–	4 (2016, 2019, 2020, 2022)
Vakhsh Qurghonteppa	–	1 (2010)
Khayr Vahdat	–	1 (2015)

== All-time top goalscorers ==
Rank	Player	Club(s)	Goals	Apps
1	(Tajikistan) Dilshod Vasiyev	Istiklol / Khujand	4	7
2	(Tajikistan) Mehrodzhiddin Muzaffarov	Khujand	2	1
2	(Ukraine) Oleksandr Kablash	Istiklol	2	1
2	(Ghana) Agbley Jones	Khosilot Farkhor / Khujand	2	2
2	(Armenia) Ruslan Koryan	Istiklol	2	1
2	(Tajikistan) Rustam Soirov	Istiklol	2	5
3	(Tajikistan) Yusuf Rabiev	Istiklol	1	3
3	(Tajikistan) Ibrahim Rabimov	Istiklol	1	2
3	(Tajikistan) Bahodur Sharipov	Vakhsh Qurghonteppa / Regar-TadAZ	1	4
3	(Ghana) Solomon Takyi	Ravshan Kulob	1	2
3	(Ghana) Charles Folley	Ravshan Kulob	1	1
3	(Uzbekistan) Sardorbek Eminov	Regar-TadAZ	1	1
3	(Ghana) David Mawutor	Istiklol	1	3
3	(Tajikistan) Romish Jalilov	Istiklol	1	5
3	(Tajikistan) Jahongir Ergashev	Istiklol / Khujand / Regar-TadAZ	1	6
3	(Tajikistan) Khurshed Makhmudov	Istiklol	1	2
3	(Tajikistan) Fatkhullo Fatkhulloyev	Istiklol / Khujand	1	10
3	(Tajikistan) Davronjon Ergashev	Istiklol / Khujand	1	5
3	(Tajikistan) Farkhod Tokhirov	Istiklol / Khujand	1	4
3	(Tajikistan) Dilshodzhon Karimov	Khujand	1	2
3	(Tajikistan) Khairullo Azizov	Khosilot Farkhor	1	1
3	(Russia) Dmitry Barkov	Istiklol	1	1
3	(Tajikistan) Firdavs Chakalov	Khujand	1	4
3	(Belarus) Mikalay Zyanko	Istiklol	1	1
3	(Tajikistan) Nozim Babadjanov	Istiklol / Ravshan Kulob / Regar-TadAZ	1	4
3	(Tajikistan) Shahrom Samiev	Istiklol	1	1
3	(Tajikistan) Manuchekhr Dzhalilov	Istiklol	1	7
3	(Tajikistan) Mukhammadzhon Rakhimov	Istiklol / Ravshan Kulob	1	5
3	(Uzbekistan) Sanjar Rixsiboev	Khujand	1	1
3	(Netherlands) Hüseyin Doğan	Istiklol	1	1
3	(Tajikistan) Alisher Dzhalilov	Istiklol	1	6
3	(Tajikistan) Amirjon Safarov	Ravshan Kulob	1	1
3	(Nigeria) Blessing Eleke	Istiklol	1	1
3	(Turkmenistan) Musa Nurnazarov	Ravshan Kulob	1	1
3	(Nigeria) Joshua Akpudje	Istiklol	1	1
3	(Tajikistan) Sherzod Makhamadiev	Regar-TadAZ	1	1

Own goals:

- (Tajikistan) Daler Shomurodov - Ravshan Kulob vs Istiklol 26 March 2014
- (Tajikistan) Firdavs Chakalov - Khujand vs Istiklol 2 March 2018

== See also ==
- USSR Super Cup

== Links ==
- Superçomi Toçikiston
