= 2012 Tajikistan Cup =

2012 Tajik Cup
Tournament details
- Country: Tajikistan

Final positions
- Champions: Regar-TadAZ
- Runners-up: Istiqlol

The 2012 Tajik Cup was the 2012 edition of the Tajik Cup. The cup winner qualified for the 2013 AFC Cup.

== Preliminary round ==
Draw made on 6 June.

Matches played on 15 and 19 June.

Team 1	Agg.	Team 2	1st leg	2nd leg
Samar	3–4	RTSU	2–1	1–3
Daleron	w/o	Sitora	–	–

== Round of 16 ==
Draw made on 25 June.

First legs played on 7 and 8 July.

Second legs played on 14 and 15 July.

Team 1	Agg.	Team 2	1st leg	2nd leg
Khayr	4–1	Daleron	1–0	3–1
Ravshan	3–4	Energetik	1–2	2–2 (aet)
CSKA Pomir	2–1	Vakhsh	2–1	0–0
Parvoz	w/o	Istiqlol	–	–
Guardia	w/o	Khujand	–	–
RTSU	w/o	Zarafshon	1–3	–
Kuktosh	w/o	Hosilot	–	–
Regar-TadAZ	8–1	Istaravshan	4–1	4–0

== Quarter-finals ==
First legs played on 22 and 23 August.

Second legs played on 26 and 27 August.

Team 1	Agg.	Team 2	1st leg	2nd leg
Khayr	3–5	Energetik	2–3	1–2
CSKA Pomir	0–1	Istiqlol	0–1	0–0
Guardia	2–2 (a)	Zarafshon	1–0	1–2
Hosilot	2–6	Regar-TadAZ	2–3	0–3 (awd)

== Semi-finals ==
First legs played on 12 September.

Second legs played on 15 and 17 September.

== Semi-finals ==
12 September 2012 1st leg	Energetik Dushanbe	1 – 3	Istiklol
0 (UTC+5)

17 September 2012 2nd leg	Istiklol	1 – 1 (4 – 2 agg.)	Energetik Dushanbe	Dushanbe
(UTC+5)	Vasiev 74' (pen.)	Report	Baffoe 69'; P.Kalugin (red card) 21'	Stadium: Republican Stadium

12 September 2012 1st leg	Guardia	0 – 3	Regar-TadAZ	Dushanbe
(UTC+5)		Report		Stadium: Stadion Politekhnikum

15 September 2012 2nd leg	Regar-TadAZ	8 – 0 (11 – 0 agg.)	Guardia	Tursunzoda
(UTC+5)	Makhmudov 23'; Saidov 38', 51'; Holbekov 46'; Rakhmatov 61', 83', 90'; Egamberdiev 86'	Report		Stadium: TALCO Arena

== Final ==
Played on 5 October.

5 October 2012

Istiklol	1–1 (a.e.t.)	Regar-TadAZ
Vasiev 89' (pen.)	Report	Khamrakulov 80'
Penalties
Vasiev (penalty scored); Fatkhuloev (penalty scored); Rabimov (penalty missed); Davronov (penalty scored); Sodikov (penalty scored); Rajabov (penalty scored); Tuychiev (penalty missed)	5–6	(penalty scored) Eminov; (penalty scored) Negmatov; (penalty scored) Makhmudov; (penalty missed) Tukhtasunov; (penalty scored) Khamrakulov; (penalty scored) Choriyev; (penalty scored) Kholbekov

20 Years of Independence Stadium, Khujand
Referee: Ravshan Ishmatov

GK	1	(Tajikistan) Alisher Tuychiev
DF	3	(Tajikistan) Sokhib Suvonkulov
DF	4	(Tajikistan) Eraj Rajabov
DF	6	(Tajikistan) Davron Ergashev
MF	9	(Tajikistan) Nuriddin Davronov
MF	10	(Tajikistan) Jakhongir Jalilov		(substituted off) 82'
FW	12	(Tajikistan) Yusuf Rabiev		(substituted off) 60'
MF	14	(Russia) Ruslan Rafikov	Booked
FW	17	(Tajikistan) Dilshod Vasiev
MF	18	(Tajikistan) Fatkhullo Fatkhuloev
MF	23	(Germany) Alexander Frank		(substituted off) 63'
Substitutes:
MF	7	(Tajikistan) Ibrahim Rabimov		(substituted on) 82'
FW	8	(Tajikistan) Mahmadali Sodikov	(substituted on) 63'
FW	11	(Tajikistan) Farkhod Tokhirov		(substituted on) 60'
Manager:
(Tajikistan) Oleg Shirinbekov

GK	16	(Tajikistan) Alisher Dodov		(substituted off) 118'
DF	6	(Tajikistan) Farrukh Choriyev
MF	7	(Tajikistan) Jamshed Ismailov
DF	18	(Tajikistan) Alexei Negmatov
DF		(Tajikistan) Daler Tukhtasunov
MF		(Tajikistan) Akmal Saburov
MF		(Tajikistan) Khurshed Makhmudov	Booked
MF		(Tajikistan) Rahmonali Barotov		(substituted off) 65'
MF		(Tajikistan) Sukhrob Egamberdiev		(substituted off) 53'
FW		(Tajikistan) Akhtam Khamrakulov
FW		(Tajikistan) Kamil Saidov
Substitutes:
GK	1	(Uzbekistan) Farhod Yuldashev		(substituted on) 118'
DF	8	(Uzbekistan) Sardorbek Eminov		(substituted on) 53'
FW		(Tajikistan) Farkhod Kholbekov	Booked	(substituted on) 65'
Manager:
(Tajikistan) Makhmadjon Khabibulloev
