= 2017 Tajik Super Cup =

2017 Tajik Supercup
- Event: Tajik Supercup
Istiklol	Khosilot Farkhor
1	2
- Date: 4 March 2017
- Venue: Central Stadium, Hisor
- Man of the Match: Agbley Jones
- Referee: Hurshed Dadaboev
- Attendance: 14,000

The 2017 Tajik Supercup was the 8th Tajik Supercup, an annual Tajik football match played between the winners of the previous season's Tajik League and Tajik Cup. The match was contested by 2016 Tajik League and 2016 Tajik Cup champions, Istiklol, and the 2016 Tajik Cup Runners-up, Khosilot Farkhor. It was held at Central Stadium in Hisor a day before the first game of the 2017 Tajik League. Khosilot Farkhor won the match 2–1 with goals in the first half from Khairullo Azizov and Agbley Jones, with Istiklol striker Dmitry Barkov scoring a late consolation goal.

== Background ==
Istiklol qualified as League and Cup champions, suffering only one defeat domestically all season, earning them a fourth straight Tajik Supercup appearance, and seventh in total.

Khosilot Farkhor qualified as runners-up to Istiklol in both the League and the cup, for their first appearance in the Supercup.

== Match details ==
4 March 2017

Istiklol	1–2	Khosilot Farkhor
Barkov 87'	Report	K.Azizov 8'; A.Jones 29'

Central Stadium, Hisor
Attendance: 14,000
Referee: Hurshed Dadaboev

Istiklol	Khosilot Farkhor

GK	1	(Serbia) Nikola Stošić
DF	5	(Ukraine) Artem Baranovskyi	Booked
DF	19	(Tajikistan) Akhtam Nazarov
DF	26	(Tajikistan) Sokhib Suvonkulov		(substituted off) 35'
MF	4	(Ghana) David Mawutor
MF	8	(Tajikistan) Nuriddin Davronov
MF	18	(Tajikistan) Fatkhullo Fatkhuloev
MF	20	(Tajikistan) Amirbek Juraboev
FW	10	(Russia) Dmitry Barkov
FW	17	(Tajikistan) Dilshod Vasiev		(substituted off) 35'
FW	62	(Tajikistan) Jahongir Ergashev		(substituted off) 35'
Substitutes:
GK	35	(Tajikistan) Kurban Boboev
DF	2	(Tajikistan) Siyovush Asrorov
DF	3	(Tajikistan) Tabrezi Davlatmir
FW	9	(Tajikistan) Jahongir Aliev		(substituted in) 35'
MF	21	(Tajikistan) Romish Jalilov		(substituted in) 35'
MF	23	(Tajikistan) Ehson Panjshanbe
FW	63	(Tajikistan) Manuchekhr Dzhalilov		(substituted in) 35'
Manager:
(Tajikistan) Mukhsin Mukhamadiev Assistant referees: Fourth official:

GK	25	(Tajikistan) Rustam Rizoev
DF	2	(Tajikistan) Safarali Karimov
DF	3	(Ghana) Sadiq Musa	Booked
DF	8	(Tajikistan) Khairullo Azizov		(substituted off) 83'
DF	14	(Tajikistan) Oybek Abdugafforov	Booked
DF	24	(Tajikistan) Hasan Rustamov	Booked
MF	7	(Tajikistan) Ibrahim Rabimov	Booked
MF	19	(Tajikistan) Muhammadjoni Hasan
MF	21	(Tajikistan) Abdurasul Rakhmonov	Booked
FW	11	(Tajikistan) Shodibek Gaforov		(substituted off) 13'
FW	20	(Ghana) Agbley Jones
Substitutes:
GK	16	(Tajikistan) Fathullo Boboev
FW	11	(Tajikistan) Saidaliev Safarali
FW	17	(Tajikistan) Navruz Rustamov		(substituted in) 83'
MF	18	(Ghana) Gershon Akuffo	Booked	(substituted in) 13'
DF	26	(Tajikistan) Shahzod Davlatov
Manager:

== See also ==
- 2016 Tajik League
- 2016 Tajik Cup
