= 2012 Tajik Super Cup =

2012 Tajik Supercup
- Event: Tajik Supercup
Istiklol	Regar-TadAZ
2	1
- Date: 2012
- Venue: Khair Stadium, Vahdat

The 2012 Tajik Football Super Cup was the 3rd Tajik Supercup match, a football match which was contested between the 2011 League champions, Istiklol, and the Cup champions, Regar-TadAZ.

== Match details ==
2011
(UTC+5)

Istiklol	2–1	Regar-TadAZ
Rabiev 35'; Rabimov 85'	Report	B.Sharipov 87' (pen.)

Khair Stadium, Vahdat

Istiklol	Regar-TadAZ

GK	1	(Tajikistan) Alisher Tuychiev
DF	3	(Tajikistan) Sokhib Suvonkulov
DF	4	(Tajikistan) Eraj Rajabov
DF	6	(Tajikistan) Davron Ergashev
DF	14	(Russia) Ruslan Rafikov
MF	7	(Tajikistan) Ibrahim Rabimov
MF	10	(Tajikistan) Jakhongir Jalilov	(substituted off) 61'
MF	18	(Tajikistan) Fatkhullo Fatkhuloev	Substituted off
FW	5	(Tajikistan) Mahmadali Sodikov
FW	12	(Tajikistan) Yusuf Rabiev
FW	17	(Tajikistan) Dilshod Vasiev	Substituted off
Substitutes:
MF	2	(Tajikistan) Akmal Saburov	Substituted in
MF	9	(Tajikistan) Nuriddin Davronov	Substituted in
MF	13	(Russia) Aleksandr Kudryashov	(substituted in) 61'
Manager:
(Tajikistan) Alimzhon Rafikov Assistant referees: Fourth official:

GK	1	(Uzbekistan) Farkhod Yuldoshev
DF	6	(Russia) Farrukh Choriyev
DF	18	(Tajikistan) Alexei Negmatov
MF	7	(Tajikistan) Jamshed Ismailov
DF		(Ukraine) Victor Lihovidko
MF		(Tajikistan) Rasul Payzov
MF		(Tajikistan) Rahmonali Barotov	(substituted off) 46'
MF		(Tajikistan) Ilkhomjon Ortikov	(substituted off) 58'
FW		(Tajikistan) Kamil Saidov	(substituted off) 72'
		(Tajikistan) Alisher Sharifov
		(Tajikistan) Davron Tuhtasunov
Substitutes:
MF		(Tajikistan) Bahodur Sharipov	(substituted in) 46'
MF		(Tajikistan) Sukhrob Egamberdiev	(substituted in) 58'
FW		(Tajikistan) Askar Ravshanov	(substituted in) 72'
Manager:
(Tajikistan)

== See also ==
- 2011 Tajik League
- 2011 Tajik Cup
