= 2015 Tajik Super Cup =

2015 Tajik Supercup
- Event: Tajik Supercup
Istiklol	Khayr Vahdat
2	2
- Date: 5 April 2015
- Venue: Central Republican Stadium, Dushanbe
- Referee: Nasrullo Kabirov

The 2015 Tajik Football Super Cup was the 6th Tajik Supercup match, a football match which was contested between the 2014 Tajik League and Cup champions, Istiklol, and the Tajik League Runners-up, Khayr Vahdat.

== Match details ==
5 April 2015

Istiklol	2–2	Khujand
Makhmudov 38'; Fatkhuloev 42'	Report	Muzaffarov 70', 86'
Penalties
Davronov (penalty scored); Umarbayev (penalty scored); Fatkhuloev (penalty scored); Bleda (penalty missed); Sharipov (penalty scored)	4 – 3	Sharifov (penalty scored); Muzaffarov (penalty scored); Saburov (penalty missed); Parpiev (penalty scored); Sharipov (penalty missed)

Central Republican Stadium, Dushanbe
Referee: Nasrullo Kabirov

Istiklol	Khujand

GK	1	(Serbia) Nikola Stošić
DF	3	(Tajikistan) Sokhib Suvonkulov
DF	5	(Tajikistan) Alisher Safarov
DF	6	(Spain) José Ballester		(substituted off) 64'
DF	15	(Ukraine) Petro Kovalchuk	(yellow card) 52'
DF	19	(Tajikistan) Akhtam Nazarov		(substituted off) 76'
MF	8	(Tajikistan) Nuriddin Davronov	(yellow card) 104'
MF	9	(Tajikistan) Khurshed Makhmudov		(substituted off) 80'
MF	11	(Tajikistan) Jakhongir Jalilov
MF	18	(Tajikistan) Fatkhullo Fatkhuloev	(yellow card) 116'
FW	10	(Spain) Manolo Bleda
Substitutes:
GK	16	(Tajikistan) Alisher Tuychiev
DF	2	(Tajikistan) Siyovush Asrorov
DF	4	(Tajikistan) Eraj Rajabov
MF	7	(Tajikistan) Umedzhon Sharipov		(substituted in) 76'
DF	20	(Tajikistan) Ziёvuddin Fuzaylov
DF	22	(Iran) Mehdi Chahjouyi		(substituted in) 64'
MF	39	(Tajikistan) Parvizdzhon Umarbayev		(substituted in) 80'
Manager:
(Tajikistan) Mubin Ergashev Assistant referees: Fourth official:

GK	16	(Tajikistan) Mirali Murodov	(yellow card) 60'
DF	6	(Tajikistan) Daler Sharipov
DF	15	(Tajikistan) Bahodur Sharipov
DF	17	(Tajikistan) Idibek Khabibulloev		(substituted off) 91'
MF	4	(Tajikistan) Firuz Shamsiev
MF	14	(Tajikistan) Muhsin Parpiev
MF	19	(Tajikistan) Parviz Khamidov
MF	24	(Tajikistan) Akmal Saburov
FW	8	(Tajikistan) Fazliddin Safarov		(substituted off) 50'
FW	10	(Tajikistan) Mehrodzhiddin Muzaffarov
FW	26	(Tajikistan) Farhad Safarmadov	(yellow card) 24'	(substituted off) 120'
Substitutes:
GK	1	(Tajikistan) Hudodagi Abdurahimov
	5	(Tajikistan) Sunatullo Madaliev		(substituted in) 91'
	9	(Tajikistan) Vohid Sohibnazar		(substituted in) 50'
MF	11	(Tajikistan) Jahongir Khairov
	12	(Tajikistan) Subhoniddin Zabirov
	16	(Tajikistan) Khushvakhtov Karaev		(substituted in) 120'
Manager:
(Tajikistan) Takhirdzhon Muminov

== See also ==
- 2015 Tajik League
- 2015 Tajik Cup
