= 2014 Tajik Super Cup =

2014 Tajik Supercup
- Event: Tajik Supercup
Ravshan	Istiklol
0	5
- Date: 26 March 2014
- Venue: Kulob Central Stadium, Kulob
- Referee: Hurshed Dadabaev
- Attendance: 18,000

The 2014 Tajik Football Super Cup was the 5th Tajik Supercup match, a football match which was contested between the 2013 Tajik League champions, Ravshan, and the Tajik Cup champions, Istiklol.

== Match details ==
26 March 2014
17:45 (UTC+5)

Ravshan	0–5	Istiklol
	Report	Mawutor 6'; R.Jalilov 25'; Vasiev 59'; Ergashev 77'; Shomodurov 85' (o.g.)

Kulob Central Stadium, Kulob
Attendance: 18,000
Referee: Hurshed Dadabaev

Ravshan	Istiklol

GK	(Tajikistan) Rustam Rizoev	(substituted off) 89'
DF	(Ghana) Sadiq Musa
DF	(Tajikistan) Hasan Rustamov
DF	(Tajikistan) Daler Shomurodov
DF	(Tajikistan) Bakhtiyor Khasanov
MF	(Tajikistan) Jamshed Ismailov	(substituted off) 62'
MF	(Tajikistan) Khikmatullo Rasulov
MF	(Tajikistan) Muhammadjon Hassan
MF	(Uzbekistan) Sayriddin Gafforov
FW	(Tajikistan) Navruz Rustamov	(substituted off) 76'
MF	(Ghana) Solomon Takyi
Substitutes:
	(Tajikistan) Zokir Abdulhayrov	(substituted in) 62'
	(Tajikistan) Hindu Huseynov	(substituted in) 76'
GK	(Tajikistan) Nemat Toshev	(substituted in) 89'
Manager:
(Tajikistan) Assistant referees: Fourth official:

GK	16	(Tajikistan) Alisher Tuychiev
DF	2	(Tajikistan) Siyovush Asrorov
DF	3	(Brazil) Glaúber da Silva
DF	4	(Tajikistan) Eraj Rajabov
DF	19	(Tajikistan) Akhtam Nazarov
MF	8	(Tajikistan) Nuriddin Davronov
MF	14	(Ghana) David Mawutor	Booked
MF	18	(Tajikistan) Fatkhullo Fatkhuloev	Booked
MF	20	(Tajikistan) Khurshed Makhmudov		(substituted off) 72'
MF	21	(Tajikistan) Romish Jalilov		(substituted off) 87'
FW	17	(Tajikistan) Dilshod Vasiev		(substituted off) 79'
Substitutes:
MF	24	(Tajikistan) Alisher Safarov		(substituted in) 87'
FW	12	(Tajikistan) Jahongir Ergashev		(substituted in) 72'
FW	10	(Brazil) Willer		(substituted in) 79'
Manager:
(Tajikistan) Mubin Ergashev

== See also ==
- 2014 Tajik League
- 2014 Tajik Cup
