= 2013 Tajikistan Cup =

2013 Tajik Cup
Tournament details
- Country: Tajikistan

Final positions
- Champions: Istiklol (3rd title)
- Runners-up: Regar-TadAZ

The 2013 Tajik Cup was the 22nd edition of the Tajik Cup. The cup winner qualified for the 2015 AFC Cup.

== Semifinals ==
Team 1	Agg.	Team 2	1st leg	2nd leg
Regar-TadAZ	4-3	Vakhsh Qurghonteppa	2-3	2-0
Parvoz Bobojon Ghafurov	0-5	Istiklol	0-2	0-3

== Final ==
5 October 2013
(UTC+5)

Istiklol	2–0	Regar-TadAZ
Ergashev 44', 70'	Summary; Istiklol Report

Tsentralnyi Stadium, Qurghonteppa
Attendance: 5,000
Referee: Rush Ishmatov

GK	16	(Tajikistan) Alisher Tuychiev
DF	2	(Tajikistan) Siyovush Asrorov	Booked
DF	3	(Brazil) Glaúber da Silva
DF	4	(Tajikistan) Eraj Rajabov
DF	5	(Tajikistan) Akhtam Nazarov
MF	7	(Tajikistan) Ibrahim Rabimov
MF	18	(Tajikistan) Fatkhullo Fatkhuloev		(substituted off) 79'
MF	88	(Tajikistan) Nuriddin Davronov		(substituted off) 67'
FW	12	(Tajikistan) Jahongir Ergashev
FW	17	(Tajikistan) Dilshod Vasiev
FW	20	(Iran) Hossein Sohrabi		(substituted off) 46'
Substitutes:
FW	10	(Brazil) Willer		(substituted on) 67'
MF	11	(Tajikistan) Jakhongir Jalilov		(substituted on) 79'
MF	23	(Tajikistan) Aleksandr Kudryashov		(substituted on) 46'
Manager:
(Tajikistan) Oleg Shirinbekov

GK	16	(Tajikistan) Alisher Dodov
DF	2	(Tajikistan) Alisher Sharipov
DF	6	(Tajikistan) Farrukh Choriyev
DF		(Tajikistan) Daler Shomurodov	Booked
DF		(Tajikistan) Bakhtiyor Azizov	Booked	(substituted off) 75'
MF		(Tajikistan) Bakhtiyor Kalandarov	Booked
MF		(Tajikistan) Farruhi Jurakhon		(substituted off) 79'
MF		(Tajikistan) Khurshed Makhmudov
MF		(Tajikistan) Farkhod Kholbekov		(substituted off) 46'
MF		(Uzbekistan) Sardorbek Eminov
FW		(Tajikistan) Akhtam Khamrakulov	(yellow card) 56' (yellow-red card)
Substitutes:
MF		(Tajikistan) Abdurasul Rakhmonov		(substituted on) 46'
FW		(Tajikistan) Firuz Rakhmatov		(substituted on) 75'
FW		(Tajikistan) Shodibek Gafforov		(substituted on) 79'
Manager:
(Tajikistan) Makhmadjon Khabibulloev
