= 2016 Tajikistan Cup =

2016 Tajik Cup
Tournament details
- Country: Tajikistan

Final positions
- Champions: Istiklol (6th title)
- Runners-up: Khosilot Farkhor

Tournament statistics
- Matches played: 29
- Goals scored: 91 (3.14 per match)
- Top goal scorer(s): Manuchekhr Dzhalilov (9 goals)

The 2016 Tajik Cup was the 25th edition of the Tajik Cup. The cup winner qualified for the 2017 AFC Cup.

== Last 16 ==
23 July 2016 1st leg	Istiklol	7 – 0	Panjshir	Dushanbe
17:30 (UTC+5)	Dzhalilov 7', 9', 14'; Babadjanov 40'; S.Boboev 51', 66'; E.Panjshanbe 86'	Summary		Stadium: Republican Stadium; Attendance: 300; Referee: Bahrom Sadulloev

30 July 2016 2nd leg	Panjshir	0 – 7 (0 – 14 agg.)	Istiklol	Kolkhozobod
(UTC+5)	R.Azizov; A.Todzhiahmedov (yellow card)	Summary	Sharipov 6'; Vasiev 32', 38', 63', 75'; Fatkhuloev 72'; Aliev 79'; Babadjanov (yellow card); D.Mawutor (yellow card); S.Jalilov (yellow card)	Stadium: Panjshir Uktam Mamatova; Attendance: 5,000; Referee: Amirdzhon Horkashev

24 July 2016 1st leg	Ravshan	2 – 0	Vakhsh Qurghonteppa	Kulob
(UTC+5)	M.Nazarov 17'; C.Daler 66'	Summary	B.Niyozov (yellow card)	Stadium: Central Stadium; Attendance: 500; Referee: Khusrawi Siddikzod

2nd leg	Vakhsh Qurghonteppa	– (– agg.)	Ravshan	Qurghonteppa
(UTC+5)		[ Summary]		Stadium: Tsentralnyi Stadium

24 July 2016 1st leg	CSKA Dushanbe	0 – 1	Khayr Vahdat	Dushanbe
(UTC+5)	S.Asimov (yellow card)	Summary	M.Inocente 58'; M.Parpiev (yellow card)	Stadium: CSKA Stadium; Attendance: 300; Referee: Nekruzi Umarov

2nd leg	Khayr Vahdat	– (– agg.)	CSKA Dushanbe	Vahdat
(UTC+5)		[ Summary]		Stadium: Khair Stadium

24 July 2016 1st leg	Khosilot Farkhor	5 – 0	Parvin Bohtar	Farkhar
(UTC+5)	N.Rustamov 18'; Saidov 33', 52'; S.Safarali 88'; N.Makhmudov 90+2'; Rabimov (yellow card)	Summary	F.Sattorov (yellow card)	Stadium: Central Stadium; Attendance: 3,500; Referee: Amirdzhon Horkashev

2nd leg	Parvin Bohtar	– (– agg.)	Khosilot Farkhor
(UTC+5)		[ Summary]

24 July 2016 1st leg	Saroykamar Panj	0 – 2	Khujand	Kumsangir
(UTC+5)	S.Vakhobov (yellow card); N.Mamadkulov (yellow card); H.Yamaki (yellow card); J.Gafforov (yellow card)	Summary	I.Barotov 59' (yellow card); H.Ziyoev 73'; S.Sanginov (yellow card)	Stadium: Central Stadium; Attendance: 3,000; Referee: Saivali Turdiev

2nd leg	Khujand	– (– agg.)	Saroykamar Panj	Khujand
(UTC+5)		[ Summary]		Stadium: 20 Years of Independence Stadium

24 July 2016 1st leg	Candi	0 – 2	Barki Tajik	Konibodom
(UTC+5)		Summary	M.Hassan 8' (yellow card); A.Safarov 51'; Z.Fuzaylov (red card) 55'	Stadium: Youth Stadium; Attendance: 2,000; Referee: Murod Kurbanov

2nd leg	Barki Tajik	– (– agg.)	Candi	Dushanbe
(UTC+5)		[ Summary]

24 July 2016 1st leg	Parvoz	2 – 1	Khayr Vahdat	Ghafurov
(UTC+5)	S.Rustamzoda 18'; B.Zokirov 27'; R.Domullodzhonov (yellow card)	Summary	S.Madaliev 73' (yellow card)	Stadium: Furudgoh Stadium; Attendance: 250; Referee: Hurshed Dadoboev

2nd leg	Khayr Vahdat	– (– agg.)	Parvoz	Dushanbe
(UTC+5)		[ Summary]		Stadium: Aviator Stadium

24 July 2016 1st leg	Regar-TadAZ	0 – 0	CSKA Pamir Dushanbe	Tursunzoda
(UTC+5)	F.Karaev (yellow card); A.Sharipov (yellow card); Khamrakulov (yellow card); Dodov (yellow card)	Summary	S.Qosimov (yellow card); K.Mirzohon (yellow card); Tukhtasunov (yellow card)	Stadium: Stadium Metallurg 1st District; Attendance: 550; Referee: Nasrullo Kabirov

2nd leg	CSKA Pamir Dushanbe	– (– agg.)	Regar-TadAZ	Dushanbe
(UTC+5)		[ Summary]		Stadium: CSKA Stadium

== Quarter-final ==
20 August 2016 1st leg	Istiklol	1 – 1	Khayr Vahdat	Dushanbe
18:00 (UTC+5)	Dzhalilov 32'; Fatkhuloev (yellow card); D.Mawutor (yellow card)	Summary	M.Parpiev 74'; D.Mensah (yellow card); F.Shamsiev (yellow card); V.Sohibnazar (yellow card); D.Tugonshoev (yellow card)	Stadium: Republican Stadium; Referee: Sayëdzhon Zayniddinov

11 September 2016 2nd leg	Khayr Vahdat	0 – 3 (1 – 4 agg.)	Istiklol	Vahdat
16:00 (UTC+5)	M.Parpiev (yellow card)	Summary	Dzhalilov 38', 90+3'; Sharipov 83'; D.Mawutor (yellow card)	Stadium: Khair Stadium

== Semi-finals ==
1 October 2016 1st leg	Istiklol	4 – 0	Ravshan Kulob	Dushanbe
16:00 (UTC+5)	D.Mawutor 30' (yellow card); Dzhalilov 42', 45'; Babadjanov 90+2' (pen.); Asrorov (yellow card)	Summary	S.Saydahmad (yellow card)	Stadium: Republican Stadium; Attendance: 1,500; Referee: Saёёdzhon Zayniddinov

26 October 2016 2nd leg	Ravshan Kulob	0 – 0 (0 – 4 agg.)	Istiklol	Kulob
15:00 (UTC+5)	M.Nazarov (yellow card); Z.Rustamov (yellow card)	Summary	Kovalchuk (yellow card)	Stadium: Central Stadium; Attendance: 7,000; Referee: Khusrawi Siddikzod

1 October 2016 1st leg	Khosilot Farkhor	4 – 2	Khujand	Farkhar
16:00 (UTC+5)	S.Radzhamatov 4' (o.g.), 42' (o.g.); Rustamov 28'; Saidov 45' (yellow card)	Summary	I.Barotov 60'; Ahmadov 90' (pen.)	Stadium: Central Stadium; Attendance: 5,000; Referee: Bahrom Sadulloev

2016 2nd leg	Khujand	1 – 2 (3 – 6 agg.)	Khosilot Farkhor	Khujand
(UTC+5)	Ahmadov 52' (pen.); D.Bozorov (yellow card); I.Barotov (yellow card) (yellow-red card) 79'	Summary	N.Rustamov 41'; Rabimov 66'; Rustamov (yellow card); M.Sodik (yellow card)	Stadium: 20 Years of Independence Stadium; Referee: Nasriddin Azizov

== Final ==
5 November 2016
14:00 (UTC+5)

Istiklol	2 – 2 (a.e.t.)	Khosilot Farkhor
Fatkhuloev 13'; Dzhalilov 44'; D.Mawutor (yellow card) 45'; Babadjanov (yellow card) 75'; Aliev (yellow card) 116'	Summary	Rabimov 33'; M.Sodik 37'; H.Azizov (yellow card) 64'; S.Gafforov (yellow card) 71'; O.Adbugafforov (yellow card) 72'
Penalties
Aliev (penalty missed); Babadjanov (penalty scored); Fatkhuloev (penalty scored); Nazarov (penalty scored)	3–2	S.Karimov (penalty scored); O.Adbugafforov (penalty scored); H.Rasulov (penalty missed); Saidov (penalty missed); Rustamov (penalty missed)

Central Republican Stadium, Dushanbe
Referee: Bahrom Sadulloev

GK	1	(Serbia) Nikola Stošić
DF	2	(Tajikistan) Siyovush Asrorov
DF	15	(Ukraine) Petro Kovalchuk
DF	19	(Tajikistan) Akhtam Nazarov
MF	4	(Ghana) David Mawutor	(yellow card) 45'
MF	13	(Tajikistan) Nozim Babadjanov	(yellow card) 75'
MF	18	(Tajikistan) Fatkhullo Fatkhuloev
MF	20	(Tajikistan) Amirbek Juraboev		(substituted off) 110'
FW	9	(Tajikistan) Jahongir Aliev	(yellow card) 116'
FW	17	(Tajikistan) Dilshod Vasiev
FW	63	(Tajikistan) Manuchekhr Dzhalilov
Substitutes:
DF	3	(Tajikistan) Tabrezi Davlatmir
MF	14	(Tajikistan) Faridoon Sharipov		(substituted on) 110'
Manager:
(Serbia) Nikola Lazarevic

GK	25	(Tajikistan) Rustam Rizoev		(substituted off) 119'
DF	2	(Tajikistan) Safarali Karimov
DF	3	(Egypt) Muso Sodiq
DF	12	(Tajikistan) Hasan Rustamov
DF	14	(Tajikistan) Oybek Abdugaffor	(yellow card) 72'
DF	26	(Tajikistan) Eraj Rajabov
MF	7	(Tajikistan) Ibrahim Rabimov
MF	8	(Tajikistan) Hayrullo Azizov	(yellow card) 64'
MF	10	(Uzbekistan) Sayriddin Gafforov	(yellow card) 71'
MF	11	(Tajikistan) Khikmatullo Rasulov
FW	17	(Tajikistan) Navruz Rustamov		(substituted off) 120'
Substitutes:
GK	16	(Tajikistan) Fathullo Boboev		(substituted on) 119'
FW	22	(Tajikistan) Kamil Saidov		(substituted on) 120'
Manager:
(Tajikistan)
