= 2014 Tajikistan Cup =

2014 Tajik Cup
Tournament details
- Country: Tajikistan

Final positions
- Champions: Istiklol (4th title)
- Runners-up: Regar-TadAZ Tursunzoda

The 2014 Tajik Cup was the 23rd edition of the Tajik Cup. The cup winner qualified for the 2015 AFC Cup.

== Quarter-finals ==
4 October 2014 Quarterfinals 1st leg	Istiklol	10 – 0	Khosilot Farkhor	Dushanbe
(UTC+5)	Bleda 3', 71'; Fatkhuloev 10'; Vasiev 24', 46', 88', 90'; J.Jalilov 35'; Sharipov 45'; Saidov 68'	Summary		Stadium: Republican Stadium; Attendance: 600; Referee: Hurshed Dadaboev

9 October 2014 Quarterfinals 2nd leg	Khosilot Farkhor	2 – 5 (2 – 15 agg.)	Istiklol	Farkhar
(UTC+5)	Mahmoudov 26'; Azizov 83'	Summary	Ergashev 11', 21', 78'; Saidov 60'; Sharipov 66'	Referee: Azam Buriev

== Semi-finals ==
26 October 2014 Semifinal 1st leg	Istiklol	5 – 0	Saroykamar	Dushanbe
15:00 (UTC+5)	Bleda 9', 53' (pen.), 80'; Vasiev 30', 71'	Summary		Stadium: Republican Stadium; Attendance: 1,500; Referee: Khusrawi Siddikzod

6 November 2014 Semifinals 2nd leg	Saroykamar	1 – 1 (1 – 6 agg.)	Istiklol	Panj
(UTC+5)	I.Muhtodzhzoda 44' (pen.)	Summary	Saidov 25'	Stadium: Central Stadium; Attendance: 7,000; Referee: Sayëdzhon Zayniddinov

2014 Semifinal 1st leg	Khayr Vahdat	1 – 0	Regar-TadAZ	Vahdat
(UTC+5)		[ Summary]		Stadium: Khair Stadium

6 November 2014 Semifinals 2nd leg	Regar-TadAZ	3 – 1 (3 – 2 agg.)	Khayr Vahdat	Tursunzoda
(UTC+5)	Khamrakulov 43', 79', 90+2' (pen.)	Summary	Sharipov 14' (pen.)	Stadium: Stadium Metallurg 1st District; Attendance: 1,000; Referee: Ravshan Ishmatov

== Final ==
22 November 2014
(UTC+5)

Istiklol	5–2	Regar-TadAZ Tursunzoda
Makhmudov 12'; Vasiev 22', 81', 90+3'; R.Jalilov 43'	Report; Istiklol Report	Khamrakulov 31', 48'

Pamir Stadium, Dushanbe
Attendance: 7,000
Referee: Hurshed Dadaboev

GK	16	(Tajikistan) Alisher Tuychiev
DF	2	(Tajikistan) Siyovush Asrorov
DF	4	(Tajikistan) Eraj Rajabov
MF	7	(Tajikistan) Umedzhon Sharipov	Booked	(substituted off) 83'
MF	8	(Tajikistan) Nuriddin Davronov	Booked
MF	11	(Tajikistan) Jakhongir Jalilov
MF	14	(Ghana) David Mawutor
MF	18	(Tajikistan) Fatkhullo Fatkhuloev		(substituted off) 88'
MF	20	(Tajikistan) Khurshed Makhmudov
MF	21	(Tajikistan) Romish Jalilov
FW	17	(Tajikistan) Dilshod Vasiev
Substitutes:
DF	3	(Brazil) Glaúber da Silva		(substituted on) 83'
DF	19	(Tajikistan) Akhtam Nazarov		(substituted on) 88'
Manager:
(Tajikistan) Mubin Ergashev

GK	16	(Tajikistan) Alisher Dodov
DF	2	(Tajikistan) Alisher Sharipov
DF	6	(Tajikistan) Farrukh Choriyev
DF		(Tajikistan) Akbar Bobomurodov
MF	5	(Tajikistan) Rasul Payzov
MF		(Tajikistan) Farkhod Kholbekov
MF		(Tajikistan) Bakhtiyor Kalandarov
MF		(Tajikistan) Firuz Karaev	(substituted off) 70'
MF		(Tajikistan) Abdurasul Rakhmonov
FW		(Tajikistan) Akhtam Khamrakulov	(substituted off) 85'
Substitutes:
FW		(Tajikistan) Firuz Rakhmatov	(substituted on) 70'
FW		(Tajikistan) Numon Zokirov	(substituted on) 85'
Manager:
