= 2013 Tajik Super Cup =

- Event: Tajik Supercup
Ravshan Kulob	Regar-TadAZ
2	1
- Date: 27 March 2013
- Venue: Central Stadium, Kulob
- Referee: Ravshan Ishmatov
- Attendance: 15,000

The 2013 Tajik Supercup was the 4th Tajik Supercup, an annual Tajik football match played between the winners of the previous season's Tajik League and Tajikistan Cup. The match was contested by 2012 League champions Ravshan Kulob and the Cup champions Regar-TadAZ.

== Match ==
=== Summary ===
Ravshan Kulob opened the scoring in the 19th minute through Solomon Takyi, with Charles Folley doubling Ravshan's lead a minute before half time. Second-half substitute Sardorbek Eminov scored a late consolation goal for Regar-TadAZ, with the game finishing 2–1 to Ravshan Kulob who lifted the Tajik Supercup for the first time.

=== Details ===
27 March 2013
14:00 (UTC+5)

Ravshan Kulob	2–1	Regar-TadAZ
Takyi 19'; Folley 44'	Report	Eminov 90+4'

Central Stadium, Kulob
Referee: Ravshan Ishmatov (Bokhtar)

Ravshan Kulob	Regar-TadAZ

GK	(Tajikistan)	Rustam Rizoev
DF	(Tajikistan)	Hasan Rustamov
DF	(Ghana)	Sadik Musah
DF	(Tajikistan)	Odil Irgashev
MF	(Tajikistan)	Samad Hajiboev	Booked
MF	(Ghana)	David Mawutor		(substituted off) 46'
MF	(Tajikistan)	Sayriddin Gafforov
MF	(Tajikistan)	Khikmatullo Rasulov		(substituted off) 62'
FW	(Tajikistan)	Davronjon Tukhtasunov	Booked
FW	(Ghana)	Solomon Takyi
FW	(Ghana)	Charles Folley	Booked	(substituted off) 66'
Substitutes:
	(Ghana)	Benjamin Amankwah		(substituted in) 46'
MF	(Tajikistan)	Bakhtiyor Hasanov		(substituted in) 62'
	(Tajikistan)	Indus Huseynov		(substituted in) 66'
Manager:
(Tajikistan) Maruf Rustamov

GK	(Tajikistan)	Alisher Dodov
DF	(Brazil)	Fabricio Tocha
DF	(Ghana)	Elijah Ari
DF	(Tajikistan)	Bakhtiyor Azizov	Booked	(substituted off) 46'
DF	(Tajikistan)	Farrukh Choriyev
DF	(Tajikistan)	Safarali Karimov		(substituted off) 53'
MF	(Ghana)	Akuffo Gershon Kwasi
MF	(Tajikistan)	Akmal Saburov		(substituted off) 50'
MF	(Tajikistan)	Rasul Payzov
MF	(Tajikistan)	Khurshed Makhmudov
FW	(Tajikistan)	Kamil Saidov
Substitutes:
DF	(Tajikistan)	Daler Shomurodov	Booked	(substituted in) 46'
FW	(Tajikistan)	Akhtam Khamrakulov		(substituted in) 50'
MF	(Uzbekistan)	Sardorbek Eminov		(substituted in) 53'
Manager:
(Tajikistan) Mahmadjon Habibulloev

Man of the Match:
Assistant referees:
Kurbanmad Karimov (Khuroson)
Safarmad Shoimardonov (Khuroson)
Fourth official:
Rahmon Murtazoev (Dushanbe)

Match rules

- 90 minutes
- Penalty shoot-out if scores level
- Seven named substitutes
- Maximum of six substitutions

== See also ==
- 2012 Tajik League
- 2012 Tajikistan Cup
