= 2020 Tajikistan Cup =

Tournament details
- Country: Tajikistan
- Dates: 7 July 2020 –
- Teams: 22

Final positions
- Champions: Ravshan Kulob
- Runners-up: Khatlon

Tournament statistics
- Matches played: 21
- Goals scored: 84 (4 per match)
- All statistics correct as of 20 October 2020.

The 2020 Tajikistan Cup is the 29th edition of the Tajikistan Cup, the knockout football tournament of Tajikistan, with the winner of the cup qualifying for the 2021 AFC Cup.

== Format ==
On 13 June the preliminary round draw was held, and the format for the competition confirmed. Due to the COVID-19 pandemic in Tajikistan each stage of the tournament would be a single legged tie instead of a two-legged ties to a single legged tie. On 4 July, the dates and kickoff times for the preliminary round matches where confirmed for the 7 and 8 July 2020.

The draw for the Last 16 took place on 15 July 2020, with the eight games to take place over the weekend of 1-3 August 2020.

On 3 August, following Istiklol's victory over Mohir in the last of the Last 16 matches, the Quarter-final draw took place.

Following the conclusion of Lokomotiv-Pamir defeat to Regar-TadAZ on 15 September in the Quarterfinals, the Semifinal draw took place.

After Khatlon's victory over Istaravshan on 23 September, to join Ravshan Kulob in the final of the Tajikistan Cup, it was announced that the game would take place on 10 October at the Pamir Stadium in Dushanbe.

== Teams ==
Round	Clubs remaining	Clubs involved	Winners from previous round	New entries this round	Leagues entering at this round
Preliminary round	12	12	none	none	12 Tajikistan First League teams
Last 16	16	16	6	10	10 Tajikistan Higher League teams
Quarterfinals	8	8	8	none	none
Semifinals	4	4	4	none	none
Final	2	2	2	none	none

== Round and draw dates ==
Round	Draw date	Draw venue	First match date	Ref.
Preliminary round	13 June 2020		7 July 2020	
Last 16	15 July 2020		1 August 2020	
Quarter-finals	3 August 2020		13 September 2020	
Semi-finals	15 September 2020		22 September 2020	
Final	23 September 2020		10 October	

== Preliminary round ==
7 July 2020	Saroykamar Panj	0 – 3	Panjshir	Panj
17:00 (UTC+5)		Report
Note: Match originally ended 2-1 to Saroykamar Panj, but result was later awarded to Panjshir after Saroykamar used an illegal substitution.

7 July 2020	Ravshan Kulob	3 – 2	Hulbuk Vose	Kulob
17:00 (UTC+5)		Report		Stadium: Central Stadium

7 July 2020	Ravshan Zafarobod	6 – 1	Shohmansur Dushanbe	Zafarobod
17:00 (UTC+5)		Report

7 July 2020	Khayr Vahdat	2 – 2 (a.e.t.) (0 – 3 p)	Barkchi	Vahdat
17:00 (UTC+5)		Report		Stadium: Khair Stadium

8 July 2020	Khosilot Farkhor	1 – 4	Mohir	Farkhar
17:00 (UTC+5)		Report

8 July 2020	Isfara	1 – 5	Eskhata Khujand	Isfara
17:00 (UTC+5)		Report

== Last 16 ==
1 August 2020	Dushanbe-83	0 – 1	Regar-TadAZ	Vahdat
16:45 (UTC+5)	Azamjon Murodov (yellow card); Dilshod Rasulov (yellow card); Parvizjon Khomidov (yellow card); Nazirsho Rizomov (yellow card)	Report	Rasul Paizov 8'; Parviz Bakhtiyorzoda (yellow card) (yellow-red card) 83'; Dilovarsho Ganiev (yellow card); Jamoliddin Zardiev (yellow card); Boboev (yellow card)	Stadium: Central Stadium; Attendance: 0 Referee: Behruz Murtazoev

1 August 2020	Fayzkand	1 – 2 (a.e.t.)	Khatlon	Kulob
16:45 (UTC+5)	Anvar Murodov 14'; Jasur Kurbonov (yellow card); Dilshod Baratov (yellow card); Fakhriddin Safarzoda (yellow card); Jamshed Murodov (yellow card)	Report	Parviz Baki-Akhunov 85'; Umarjon Sharipov 111'; Ravshan Azizov (yellow card); Muhammad Naskov (yellow card); Saidsho Bozorov (yellow card)	Stadium: Central Stadium; Attendance: 0 Referee: Sayyodzhon Zainiddinov

1 August 2020	Khujand	0 – 3	Kuktosh	Khujand
16:45 (UTC+5)	Dilshod Bozorov (yellow card); Chakalov (yellow card)	Report	Mbeke Dieudonni 28' (red card) 90+4'; Mukhiddin Odilov 82'; Muhammadsharifi Saidkhoja 90+1' (pen.); Rajabov (yellow card)	Stadium: 20-Letie Nezavisimosti Stadium; Attendance: 0 Referee: Nasim Khamidov

2 August 2020	Ravshan Kulob	3 – 2 (a.e.t.)	Panjshir	Kulob
16:45 (UTC+5)	Saidamiri Saidahmad 34'; Shodi Murodov 44'; Saidamiri Saidakhmad (yellow card) (yellow-red card) 53'; Daler Shomurodov 97' (pen.); Hasan Rustamov (yellow card); Zokir Abdulkhayrov (yellow card)	Report	Nasim Mamatkulov 67'; Bahriddin Yusupov 74'; Abdulatif Tojiakhmedov (yellow card) (yellow-red card) 120+1'; Shokhin Jalilov (yellow card); Khushvakht Mirov (yellow card); Kimatsho Muminshoev (yellow card); Parviz Saidmurodov (yellow card)	Stadium: Central Stadium; Attendance: 0 Referee: Khurshed Dadoboev

2 August 2020	Barkchi	1 – 2	Lokomotiv-Pamir	Hisor
16:45 (UTC+5)	Zuhriddin Fuzailov 70'; Hikmatullo Ismoilov (yellow card)	Report	Islom Zoirov 19', 64'; Safarov (yellow card); Sharifbek Rakhmatov (yellow card)	Stadium: Central Stadium; Attendance: 0 Referee: Amirjon Khorkashev

2 August 2020	Istaravshan	3 – 1 (a.e.t.)	CSKA Pamir Dushanbe	Istaravshan
16:45 (UTC+5)	Barotov 57' (pen.), 99'; Karimov 111' (yellow card); Azizjon Shamsiev (yellow card); Zufardjon Akbaraliev (yellow card); Saiddoston Fozilov (yellow card); Sukhrob Nortojev (yellow card)	Report	Azizjon Shamsiev 23' (o.g.); Komroni Mirzohon (yellow card); Ivan Ponomarenko (yellow card); Sukhrob Dzhalilov (yellow card); Shodibek Gafforov (yellow card)	Stadium: Istaravshan-Arena; Attendance: 0 Referee: Nasrullo Kabirov

3 August 2020	Ravshan Zafarobod	1 – 4	Eskhata Khujand	Zafarobod
16:45 (UTC+5)	Azizbek Makhkamov 86'; Mavlonjon Ismoilov (yellow card); Bakhtiyor Zaripov (yellow card)	Report	Bohirjon Sanginboev 14', 44'; Juraboy Isoev 60' (yellow card); Mubinjon Muminov 61'; Abdurahmon Uzokov (yellow card) (yellow-red card) 67'; Niyozali Bobokhonov (yellow card); Rustam Saburov (yellow card)	Stadium: Ravshan Arena; Attendance: 0 Referee: Abdullo Davlatov

3 August 2020	Istiklol	11 – 0	Mohir	Dushanbe
18:30 (UTC+5)	M.Dzhalilov 5', 18', 25' (pen.), 30'; Orazsähedow 31'; Panjshanbe 63'; Boboev 66', 86'; A.Dzhalilov 68'; Hanonov 73'; R.Soirov 81'	Report		Stadium: Pamir Stadium; Attendance: 0 Referee: Nasim Khamidov

== Quarterfinals ==
13 September 2020	Ravshan Kulob	4 – 2 (a.e.t.)	Istiklol	Kulob
16:00 (UTC+5)	Rustamov 8', 90+2' (yellow card); N.Rustamov 92' (yellow card); A.Nozimov 113'; D.Cholov (yellow card); A.Farrukhzod (yellow card); S.Karimov (yellow card); S.Saydakhmad (yellow card); Z.Abdulkhayrov (yellow card)	Report	Nazarov (penalty missed) 17'; Milić 38'; R.Soirov 60'; Jalilov (yellow card)	Stadium: Central Stadium; Attendance: 0 Referee: Sayyodzhon Zainiddinov

13 September 2020	Eskhata Khujand	0 – 1	Khatlon	Khujand
(UTC+5)	Bohirjon Sanginboev (yellow card); Dilshod Karimov (yellow card)	Report	Sorbon Avgonov 32'; Saidsho Bozorov (yellow card)	Stadium: Spartak Stadium; Attendance: 0 Referee: Nasim Khamidov

15 September 2020	Istaravshan	1 – 1 (a.e.t.) (5 – 4 p)	Kuktosh	Istaravshan
(UTC+5)	Nabijon Raupov 113'; Saiddoston Fozilov (yellow card)	Report	Mbeke Siebatcheu Dieudoni 115' (yellow card); Bunyod Shodiev (yellow card); Sobirjon Kholmatov (yellow card)	Stadium: Istaravshan-Arena; Attendance: 0 Referee: Abdurakhim Boboev
	Penalties
	Barotov; Saiddoston Fozilov (penalty scored); Karimov (penalty scored); Behruz Khayriev (penalty scored); Salam Ashurmamdov (penalty scored)		(penalty scored) Mbeke Siebatcheu Dieudoni; (penalty scored) Daler Yodgorov; (penalty scored) Muhammadsharifi Saidkhoja; (penalty missed) Sobirdjon Kholmatov; (penalty scored) Hikmatullo Rasulov

15 September 2020	Lokomotiv-Pamir	2 – 4	Regar-TadAZ	Neftyanik
(UTC+5)	Emomali Ahmadkhon 22' (yellow card); Jonibek Sharipov 34' (yellow card); Sharifbek Rakhmatov (red card) 67'; Nidoyor Zabirov (yellow card); Ismoiljon Alimardonov (yellow card)	Report	Shavkati Hotam 14', 59', 63' (red card) 67'; Ibragim Zokirov 90+2'; Babadjanov (yellow card); Oyatullo Safarov (yellow card); Sherzod Makhamadiev (yellow card)	Stadium: Rudaki Stadium; Attendance: 0 Referee: Behruz Murtazoev

== Semifinals ==
22 September 2020	Ravshan Kulob	1 – 0	Regar-TadAZ	Kulob
15:00 (UTC+5)	Abdurakhmon Nozimov 51'; Daler Cholov (yellow card); Shodi Murodov (yellow card); Daler Shomurodov (yellow card); Saydamiri Saydakhmad (yellow card)	Report	Rasul Paizov (yellow card); Babadjanov (yellow card)	Stadium: Central Stadium; Attendance: 0 Referee: Nasrullo Kabirov

23 September 2020	Khatlon	2 – 0	Istaravshan	Qurghonteppa
15:00 (UTC+5)	Saidov 48' (pen.); Khudoidod Uzokov 75'; Ravshan Azizov (yellow card); Parviz Baki-Akhunov (yellow card); Jen Gaten (yellow card)	Report	Asadbek Ziyozoda (yellow card)	Stadium: Pakhtakor Stadium; Attendance: 0 Referee: Behruz Murtazoev

== Final ==
18 October 2020	Ravshan Kulob	1 – 0	Khatlon	Hisor
14:00 (UTC+5)	Daler Shomurodov 67' (pen.); Safarali Karimov (yellow card); Daler Cholov (yellow card); Khasan Rustamov (yellow card)	Report	Jen Gaten (yellow card); Toni Bikatal (yellow card)	Stadium: Central Stadium; Attendance: 0 Referee: Nasrullo Kabirov

== Scorers ==
As of match played 1 August 2020

== See also ==
- 2020 Tajikistan Higher League
- 2020 Tajikistan First League
