= 2010 Tajik Super Cup =

2010 Tajik Supercup
- Event: Tajik Supercup
Vakhsh Qurghonteppa	Istiklol
0	2
- Date: 6 March 2010
- Venue: Metallurg Stadium, Tursunzoda
- Referee: Orif Djuraev
- Attendance: 5,000

The 2010 Tajik Football Super Cup was the 1st Tajik Supercup match, a football match which was contested between the 2009 Tajik League champions, Vakhsh Qurghonteppa, and the Tajik Cup champions, Istiklol.

== Match details ==
6 March 2010
(UTC+5)

Vakhsh Qurghonteppa	0–2 (a.e.t.)	Istiklol
	Report	Vasiev 102', 107'

Metallurg Stadium, Tursunzoda
Attendance: 5,000
Referee: Orif Djuraev

Vakhsh Qurghonteppa	Istiklol

GK
DF
MF
FW
FW
FW
Substitutes:
MF
Manager:
(Tajikistan) Assistant referees: Fourth official:

(Uzbekistan) Farkhod Yuldoshev
(Ghana) Elijah Ari	Booked
(Tajikistan) Asatullo Nurulloev
(Tajikistan) Faridun Nematov
(Tajikistan) Saburov
(Tajikistan) Bahodur Sharipov	Booked	(substituted off) 55'
(Tajikistan) Rustam Khodzhaev	(substituted off) 100'
(Tajikistan) Nuriddin Khamrokul	(substituted off) 106'
(Tajikistan) Mahmadali Sodikov
(Tajikistan) Numonjon Hakimov
(Tajikistan) Rustam Usmonov
(Tajikistan) Umedzhon Sharipov	(substituted in) 55'
(Tajikistan) K.Ortikov	(substituted in) 100'
(Tajikistan) Faizulloev	(substituted in) 106'

GK	(Tajikistan) Amonsho Sodatsayrov
DF	(Tajikistan) Jakhongir Jalilov		(substituted off) 46'
DF	(Tajikistan) Umed Khabibulloyev
DF	(Tajikistan) Eraj Rajabov
DF	(Tajikistan) Sokhib Suvonkulov
DF	(Tajikistan) Daler Tukhtasunov	Booked
MF	(Tajikistan) Nuriddin Davronov		(substituted off) 105'
MF	(Tajikistan) Fatkhullo Fatkhuloev
MF	(Tajikistan) Parviz Kashkarov		(substituted off) 46'
FW	(Tajikistan) Yusuf Rabiev
FW	(Tajikistan) Dilshod Vasiev		(substituted off) 112'
Substitutes:
MF	(Tajikistan) Samad Shohzukhurov		(substituted in) 46'
FW	(Tajikistan) Khudoidod Nusratov		(substituted in) 46'
MF	(Tajikistan) Anvar Norkulov		(substituted in) 105'
FW	(Tajikistan) Farkhod Tokhirov	Booked	(substituted in) 112'
Manager:
(Tajikistan) Salohiddin Ghafurov

== See also ==
- 2009 Tajik League
- 2009 Tajik Cup
