= Jakhongir Jalilov =

Tajikistani footballer

Personal information
- Full name: Jakhongir Jalilov (Tajik: Ҷаҳонгир Ҷалилов)
- Date of birth: 28 September 1989 (age 37)
- Place of birth: Tajikistan
- Height: 1.74 m (5 ft 9 in)
- Positions: Defender; midfielder

Senior career*
| Years | Team | Apps | (Gls) |
| 2009–2016 | Istiklol | | |

International career^{‡}
| 2008–2016 | Tajikistan | 28 | (0) |
- * Club domestic league appearances and goals as of 28 June 2016 ‡ National team caps and goals as of 28 June 2016

Jakhongir Jalilov (Tajik: Ҷаҳонгир Ҷалилов; born on 28 September 1989) is a retired Tajikistani footballer who played for FC Istiklol and the Tajikistan national football team.

== Career ==
=== Club ===
Jalilov joined FC Istiklol in 2009, before announcing his retirement from football in June 2016, on medical grounds. His last match for Istiklol was a 2-1 friendly defeat to Lokomotiv Moscow.

=== International ===
Jalilov represented Tajikistan at the 2012 AFC Challenge Cup.

== Career statistics ==
=== Club ===
As of match played 19 June 2016

| Club | Season | League | | | National Cup | | Continental | | Other | | Total | |
| Club | Season | Division | Apps | Goals | Apps | Goals | Apps | Goals | Apps | Goals | Apps | Goals |
|---|---|---|---|---|---|---|---|---|---|---|---|---|
| Istiklol | 2009 | Tajik League | | | | | – | | – | | | |
| Istiklol | 2010 | Tajik League | | | | | – | | 1 | 0 | 1 | 0 |
| Istiklol | 2011 | Tajik League | | | | | 5 | 0 | 1 | 0 | 6 | 0 |
| Istiklol | 2012 | Tajik League | | | | | 5 | 0 | 1 | 0 | 6 | 0 |
| Istiklol | 2013 | Tajik League | 12 | 0 | | | – | | – | | 12 | 0 |
| Istiklol | 2014 | Tajik League | 14 | 0 | 5 | 2 | – | | 0 | 0 | 19 | 2 |
| Istiklol | 2015 | Tajik League | 10 | 0 | 4 | 0 | 10 | 0 | 1 | 0 | 25 | 0 |
| Istiklol | 2016 | Tajik League | 4 | 0 | 0 | 0 | 4 | 0 | 1 | 0 | 9 | 0 |
| Istiklol | Total | | 41 | 0 | 9 | 2 | 24 | 0 | 5 | 0 | 79 | 2 |
| Career total | | | 41 | 0 | 9 | 2 | 24 | 0 | 5 | 0 | 79 | 2 |

=== International ===
Tajikistan national team
| Year | Apps | Goals |
|---|---|---|
| 2008 | 3 | 0 |
| 2009 | 0 | 0 |
| 2010 | 0 | 0 |
| 2011 | 3 | 0 |
| 2012 | 6 | 0 |
| 2013 | 2 | 0 |
| 2014 | 5 | 0 |
| 2015 | 7 | 0 |
| 2016 | 2 | 0 |
| Total | 28 | 0 |

Statistics accurate as of match played 29 March 2016

== Honors ==
Istiklol

- Tajik League (4): 2010, 2011, 2014, 2015
- Tajik Cup (3): 2010, 2013, 2014
- Tajik Supercup (6) : 2010, 2011, 2012, 2014, 2015, 2016
- AFC President's Cup (1): 2012
