= Siyovush Asrorov =

Tajikistani footballer

Personal information
- Full name: Siyovush Mukhtorovich Asrorov
- Date of birth: 21 July 1992 (age 34)
- Place of birth: Qurghonteppa, Tajikistan
- Height: 1.87 m (6 ft 2 in)
- Position: Defender

Team information
- Current team: Vakhsh Bokhtar
- Number: 2

Senior career*
Years	Team	Apps	(Gls)
2012	Khujand		
2013–2018	Istiklol	69	(8)
2019	PKNP FC	7	(0)
2019–2020	Rahmatganj MFS	6	(1)
2020	Lokomotiv-Pamir	9	(0)
2020–2021	Sheikh Russel	21	(5)
2022	Rahmatganj MFS	17	(3)
2022–2023	Istiklol	21	(0)
2023–2024	Eskhata	25	(5)
2025–	Vakhsh Bokhtar	16	(3)

International career^{‡}
2014–	Tajikistan	46	(0)
- * Club domestic league appearances and goals as of 16 March 2026 ‡ National team caps and goals as of 29 March 2023

Siyovush Mukhtorovich Asrorov (Tajik: Сиёвуш Мухторович Асроров, Russian: ‌Сиёвуш Мухторович Асроров), born 21 July 1992 is a Tajik footballer who plays for Vakhsh Bokhtar in the Tajikistan Higher League and the Tajikistan national football team.

== Career ==
=== Club ===
On 16 January 2019, Asrorov signed for Malaysia Super League club, PKNP FC.

On 1 November 2019, Asrorov signed for Rahmatganj MFS in Bangladesh Premier League.

On 8 December 2020, Asrorov signed for Sheikh Russel KC in Bangladesh Premier League.

On 24 December 2020, Asrorov scores his 1st goal for Sheikh Russel KC in 2020–21 Bangladesh Federation Cup.

On 3 August 2022, Istiklol announced the return of Asrorov after three-years away.

On 14 July 2023, Asrorov left Istiklol by mutual agreement alongside Daler Imomnazarov and Sayedi Kovussho. On 22 July, Asrorov joined Eskhata Khujand.

== Career statistics ==
=== Club ===
As of match played 30 June 2023

Club	Season	League			National Cup		League Cup		Continental		Other		Total	
Club	Season	Division	Apps	Goals	Apps	Goals	Apps	Goals	Apps	Goals	Apps	Goals	Apps	Goals
Istiklol	2013	Tajikistan Higher League	4	1	3	0	–		–		–		7	1
Istiklol	2014	Tajikistan Higher League	10	2	5	0	–		–		1	0	16	2
Istiklol	2015	Tajikistan Higher League	11	2	5	1	–		11	0	0	0	27	3
Istiklol	2016	Tajikistan Higher League	16	2	7	0	–		4	0	1	0	28	2
Istiklol	2017	Tajikistan Higher League	12	1	3	1	–		11	0	0	0	26	2
Istiklol	2018	Tajikistan Higher League	16	0	4	1	–		4	0	1	0	25	1
Istiklol	Total		69	8	27	3	-	-	30	0	3	0	129	11
PKNP	2019	Malaysia Super League	7	0	0	0	–		–		–		7	0
Rahmatganj MFS	2019–20	Bangladesh Premier League	6	1	0	0	0	0	–		–		6	1
Lokomotiv-Pamir	2020	Tajikistan Higher League	9	0	2	0	–		–		–		11	0
Sheikh Russel	2020–21	Bangladesh Premier League	21	5	1	1	0	0	–		–		22	6
Rahmatganj MFS	2021–22	Bangladesh Premier League	17	3	0	0	0	0	–		–		17	3
Istiklol	2022	Tajikistan Higher League	14	0	5	0	–		0	0	0	0	19	0
Istiklol	2022	Tajikistan Higher League	7	0	0	0	–		0	0	0	0	7	0
Istiklol	Total		21	0	5	0	-	-	0	0	0	0	26	0
Career total			150	17	35	4	0	0	30	0	3	0	218	21

=== International ===
Tajikistan national team
Year	Apps	Goals
2014	5	0
2015	7	0
2016	8	0
2017	6	0
2018	7	0
2019	6	0
2020	0	0
2021	0	0
2022	5	0
2023	2	0
Total	46	0

Statistics accurate as of match played 28 March 2023

== Honors ==
Istiklol

- Tajikistan Higher League: 2014, 2015,2016, 2017, 2022
- Tajikistan Cup: 2013, 2014, 2015, 2016, 2022
- Tajik Supercup: 2014, 2015, 2016, 2018

Tajikistan

- King's Cup: 2022
