= 2021 Tajik Super Cup =

- Event: Tajik Supercup
Istiklol	Ravshan
2	0
- Date: 3 April 2021
- Venue: Central Stadium, Hisor
- Man of the Match: Huseyin Dogan (Istiklol)
- Referee: Abdullo Davlatov
- Attendance: 5,500

The 2021 Tajik Supercup was the 12th Tajik Supercup, an annual Tajik football match played between the winners of the previous season's Tajikistan Higher League and Tajikistan Cup. The match was contested by 2020 League champions Istiklol, and the 2020 Cup champions Ravshan. It was held at the Central Stadium in Hisor on 3 April.

== Background ==
On 1 April, Abdullo Davlatov was confirmed as the match referee.

== Match details ==
3 April 2021
16:00 (UTC+5)

Istiklol	2–0	Ravshan
Dogan 52'; A.Dzhalilov 60'

Central Stadium, Hisor
Referee: Abdullo Davlatov

Istiklol	Ravshan

GK	1	(Tajikistan)	Rustam Yatimov
DF	3	(Ukraine)	Andriy Mischenko
DF	19	(Tajikistan)	Akhtam Nazarov
DF	21	(Ukraine)	Oleksiy Larin
DF	55	(Tajikistan)	Manuchehr Safarov
MF	8	(Tajikistan)	Nuriddin Davronov
MF	10	(Tajikistan)	Alisher Dzhalilov	Yellow card
MF	11	(Tajikistan)	Muhammadjon Rakhimov		(substituted off) 46'
MF	17	(Japan)	Ryota Noma		(substituted off) 83'
FW	7	(Netherlands)	Huseyin Dogan		(substituted off) 83'
FW	63	(Tajikistan)	Manuchekhr Dzhalilov	Yellow card	(substituted off) 87'
Substitutes:
GK	99	(Tajikistan)	Mukhriddin Khasanov
DF	4	(Tajikistan)	Vahdat Hanonov	Yellow card	(substituted on) 83'
DF	6	(Tajikistan)	Zoir Juraboev	Yellow card	(substituted on) 46' (substituted off) 83'
FW	9	(Tajikistan)	Rustam Soirov		(substituted on) 83'
MF	28	(Tajikistan)	Salam Ashurmamdov		(substituted on) 87'
MF	70	(Tajikistan)	Shakhrom Sulaimonov		(substituted on) 83'
MF	77	(Tajikistan)	Khurshed-Timur Dzhuraev
Manager:
(Tajikistan) Vitaliy Levchenko

GK	1	(Tajikistan)	Rustam Rizoev
DF	2	(Tajikistan)	Safarali Karimov
DF	5	(Tajikistan)	Daler Shomurodov
DF	12	(Tajikistan)	Hasan Rustamov
DF	22	(Tajikistan)	Kholmurod Nazarov
MF	18	(Ghana)	Kingsley Osei Effah		(substituted off) 73'
MF	31	(Uzbekistan)	Nodirbek Ibragimov		(substituted off) 62'
MF	62	(Uzbekistan)	Bunyod Shodiev		(substituted off) 73'
MF	77	(Tajikistan)	Karomatullo Saidov		(substituted off) 62'
FW	11	(Uzbekistan)	Anvar Murodov		(substituted off) 62'
FW	13	(Tajikistan)	Avaz Kamchinov
Substitutes:
GK	16	(Uzbekistan)	Mukhriddin Akhmedov
MF	10	(Tajikistan)	Amirdzhoni Farrukhzod		(substituted on) 62'
FW	29	(Tajikistan)	Navruz Rustamov	Yellow card	(substituted on) 62'
MF		(Tajikistan)	Shodijon Murodov		(substituted on) 62'
MF		(Tajikistan)	Zokirjon Abdulkhayrov		(substituted on) 73'
MF		(Tajikistan)	Abdurakhmon Nozimov		(substituted on) 73'
Manager:
(Tajikistan) Gairatali Mirakhmedov

Man of the Match:
Huseyin Dogan
Assistant referees:
Khasan Karimov (Nurak)
Ismoil Nuraliev (Nurak)
Fourth official:
Nasim Khamidov (Dushanbe)

Match rules

- 90 minutes
- Penalty shoot-out if scores level
- Seven named substitutes
- Maximum of six substitutions

== See also ==
- 2020 Tajikistan Higher League
- 2020 Tajikistan Cup
