= Nozim Babadjanov =

Tajik footballer (born 1995)

Personal information
- Full name: Nozim Nosyrovich Babadjanov
- Date of birth: 7 August 1995 (age 31)
- Place of birth: Tursunzoda, Tajikistan
- Height: 1.73 m (5 ft 8 in)
- Position: Attacking midfielder

Team information
- Current team: Regar-TadAZ
- Number: 13

Youth career
- 2012–2014: Rubin Kazan
- 2014: Lokomotiv Moscow

Senior career*
Years	Team	Apps	(Gls)
2015	Regar-TadAZ		
2016–2017	Istiklol	18	(6)
2017	Bahrain	6	(1)
2017	Chernomorets Balchik	0	(0)
2018–2019	Istiklol	17	(1)
2019–2020	Regar-TadAZ	37	(12)
2021	Khujand	23	(2)
2022	Al-Ahli		
2022–2023	Real Kashmir	11	(1)
2023	Khujand	16	(1)
2023	Kalteng Putra	9	(0)
2024	Ravshan Kulob	12	(4)
2024	→ Khujand (loan)	6	(4)
2025–	Regar-TadAZ	23	(4)

International career^{‡}
2015–	Tajikistan	15	(0)
- * Club domestic league appearances and goals as of 16 March 2026 ‡ National team caps and goals as of 19 July 2019

Nozim Nosyrovich Babadjanov (Tajik: Нозим Бобоҷонов; born 7 August 1995) is a Tajik professional footballer who plays as an attacking midfielder for Regar-TadAZ and the Tajikistan national team.

== Club career ==
=== Youth teams ===
Babadjanov started his career in the youth team of Rubin Kazan, before moving to Lokomotiv Moscow's youth team in 2014.

=== Regar-TadAZ ===
At the beginning of 2015, Babadjanov signed for Regar-TadAZ in his native Tajikistan, before a year later, on 11 January 2016, FC Istiklol announced that they had signed Babadjanov on a three-year contract from Regar-TadAZ in preparation for their 2016 AFC Cup campaign.

=== Bahrain ===
On 18 January 2017, Babadjanov signed a six-month contract with Bahraini Premier League club Bahrain SC.

=== Istiklol ===
On 28 February 2019, Babadjanov's contract with Istiklol was terminated by mutual consent.

=== Real Kashmir ===
In July 2022, Babadjanov moved to India and signed with I-League club Real Kashmir, on a one-year deal.

=== Kalteng Putra ===
In August 2023, he signed a contract with Indonesian club Kalteng Putra.

=== Ravshan Kulob ===
On 6 February 2024, Ravshan Kulob announced the signing of Babadjanov.

On 18 July 2024, Babadjanov joined Khujand on loan from Ravshan Kulob for the rest of the 2024 season.

=== Regar-TadAZ ===
On 16 January 2025, Regar-TadAZ announced the return of Babadjanov on a one-year contract.

== International career ==
Babadjanov made his debut for Tajikistan on 8 October 2015 against Kyrgyzstan.

== Career statistics ==
=== Club ===
As of 19 October 2023

Club	Season	League			Cup		Continental		Other		Total	
Club	Season	Division	Apps	Goals	Apps	Goals	Apps	Goals	Apps	Goals	Apps	Goals
Regar-TadAZ	2015	Tajik League					–		–			
Istiklol	2016	Tajik League	18	6	7 (Note: Appearance(s) in Tajikistan Cup)	2	2 (Note: Appearance(s) in AFC Cup)	0	1 (Note: Appearance(s) in Tajik Supercup)	0	28	8
Bahrain	2016–17	Bahraini Premier League	6	1			–		–		6	1
Chernomorets; Balchik	2017–18	Bulgarian Second League	0	0	0	0	–		–		0	0
Istiklol	2018	Tajik League	17	1	7	2	6	0	1	1	31	4
Istiklol	2019	Tajik League	0	0	0	0	1 (Note: Appearance(s) in AFC Champions League)	0	–		1	0
Istiklol	Istiklol total		17	1	7	2	7	0	1	1	35	4
Regar-TadAZ	2019	Tajik League	19	7			–		–		19	7
Regar-TadAZ	2020	Tajik League	18	5			–		–		18	5
Regar-TadAZ	Regar-TadAZ total		37	12	0	0	0	0	0	0	37	12
Khujand	2021	Tajik League	23	2			3	0	–		26	2
Al-Ahli	2021–22	Bahraini Premier League		2			–		–			2
Real Kashmir	2022–23	I-League	11	1	0	0	–		–		11	1
Khujand	2023	Tajikistan Higher League	16	1	0	0	–		–		16	1
Kalteng Putra	2023–24	Liga 2	6	0	0	0	–		–		6	0
Career total			134	26	14	4	12	0	2	1	162	31

=== International ===
As of matches played 19 July 2019

National team	Year	Apps	Goals
Tajikistan	2015	2	0
Tajikistan	2016	5	0
Tajikistan	2017	3	0
Tajikistan	2018	1	0
Tajikistan	2019	4	0
Total		15	0

Scores and results list Tajikistan's goal tally first.

#	Date	Venue	Opponent	Score	Result	Competition
1.	28 September 2026	Tongliang Long Stadium, Chongqing, China	Palestine	2–1	2–4	Friendly

== Honours ==
Istiklol

- Tajik League: 2016
- Tajik Cup: 2016
- Tajik Supercup: 2016, 2018
