= Tukhtasunov =

Tukhtasunov (Tajik: Тухтасунов) is a surname. Notable people with the surname include:

- Daler Tukhtasunov (born 1986), Tajikistani footballer
- Davronjon Tukhtasunov (born 1990), Tajikistani footballer
