= FC Dushanbe-83 =

Tajik association football club

Dushanbe-83
- Full name: Football Club Dushanbe-83
- Manager: Nazirsho Rizomov
- League: Tajikistan First League
- 2021: Tajikistan Higher League, 10th of 10 (relegated)
| Home colours | Away colours |

FC Dushanbe-83 is a football club based in Dushanbe, Tajikistan.

== History ==
FC Dushanbe-83 earned promotion to the Tajikistan Higher League for the first time in 2019, after finishing third in the 2019 Tajikistan First League.

=== Domestic history ===
| Season | League | | | | | | | | | Tajik Cup | Top goalscorer | | Manager |
| Season | Div. | Pos. | Pl. | W | D | L | GS | GA | P | Tajik Cup | Name | League | Manager |
|---|---|---|---|---|---|---|---|---|---|---|---|---|---|
| 2019 | 2nd | 3rd | 26 | 16 | 6 | 4 | 48 | 20 | 54 | Round of 16 | (Tajikistan) Elchibek Rashidbekov | 13 | |
| 2020 | 1st | 6th | 18 | 5 | 5 | 8 | 20 | 29 | 20 | Last 16 | (Tajikistan) Elchibek Rashidbekov | 6 | (Tajikistan) Nazirsho Rizomov |
| 2021 | 1st | 10th | 27 | 4 | 6 | 17 | 23 | 67 | 18 | Last 16 | | | (Tajikistan) Nazirsho Rizomov |

== Current squad ==
As of 31 March 2021

Note: Flags indicate national team as defined under FIFA eligibility rules; some limited exceptions apply. Players may hold more than one non-FIFA nationality.

| No. | Pos. | Nation | Player |
|---|---|---|---|
| — | GK | (Moldova) MDA | Stanislav Ivanov |
| — | GK | (Tajikistan) TJK | Mukhammad Nasriddinov |
| — | GK | (Tajikistan) TJK | Faromurz Saidov |
| — | DF | (Kyrgyzstan) KGZ | Daniel Tagoe |
| — | DF | (Moldova) MDA | Ion Arabadji |
| — | DF | (Tajikistan) TJK | Shahzod Davlatov |
| — | DF | (Tajikistan) TJK | Parvizjon Khomidov |
| — | DF | (Tajikistan) TJK | Eraj Rajabov |
| — | DF | (Tajikistan) TJK | Firuz Rizomov |
| — | DF | (Tajikistan) TJK | Ruziev Izzatullo |
| — | DF | (Tajikistan) TJK | Daler Tukhtasunov |
| — | MF | (Tajikistan) TJK | Alisher Ergashev |

| No. | Pos. | Nation | Player |
|---|---|---|---|
| — | MF | (Tajikistan) TJK | Daler Imomnazarov |
| — | MF | (Tajikistan) TJK | Sukhrob Otayev |
| — | MF | (Tajikistan) TJK | Anushervon Navruzov |
| — | MF | (Tajikistan) TJK | Shaikh-Esinalloh Rakhmonov |
| — | MF | (Tajikistan) TJK | Dilshod Rasulov |
| — | MF | (Tajikistan) TJK | Mukhammad Rizomov |
| — | FW | (Cameroon) CMR | Luc Mendjana |
| — | FW | (Ghana) GHA | Tete Nerrick |
| — | FW | (Iran) IRN | Amir Memari Manesh |
| — | FW | (Tajikistan) TJK | Oraz Gayurov |
| — | FW | (Tajikistan) TJK | Farhod Kosimov |
