= Daler Tukhtasunov =

Tajikistani footballer

Personal information
- Full name: Dalerjon Tukhtasunov
- Date of birth: 27 August 1986 (age 40)
- Height: 1.80 m (5 ft 11 in)
- Position: Defender

Senior career*
Years	Team	Apps	(Gls)
2003–2005	Vakhsh Qurghonteppa		
2005–2006	Torpedo Zhodino	6	(0)
2007–2008	Regar-TadAZ		
2008–2009	Vakhsh Qurghonteppa		
2009–2011	Istiklol		
2011–2013	Regar-TadAZ		
2013–2014	Ravshan Kulob		
2015	Regar-TadAZ		
2016–2018	Khujand		
2019	Regar-TadAZ		
2020	Fayzkand	15	(1)
2021	Dushanbe-83	7	(0)

International career^{‡}
2004–2016	Tajikistan	17	(1)
- * Club domestic league appearances and goals as of 14 October 2015 ‡ National team caps and goals as of 7 June 2016

Daler Tukhtasunov (Tajik: Далерҷон Тухтасунов, Dalerjon Tukhtasunov; born 27 August 1986) is a Tajik professional footballer who plays as a defender.

== Career ==
He previously played for Vakhsh Qurghonteppa and Torpedo Zhodino.'

He played for Tajikistan in 2008 AFC Challenge Cup, 2012 AFC Challenge Cup.

== Career statistics ==
=== International ===
Tajikistan national team
Year	Apps	Goals
2004	1	0
2005	0	0
2006	0	0
2007	1	0
2008	6	1
2009	0	0
2010	0	0
2011	0	0
2012	2	0
2013	2	0
2014	0	0
2015	3	0
2016	2	0
Total	17	1

Statistics accurate as of match played 7 June 2016

=== International goals ===
#	Date	Venue	Opponent	Score	Result	Competition
1.	3 August 2008	Hyderabad, India	Afghanistan	2–0	4–0	2008 AFC Challenge Cup

== Honours ==
Vakhsh Qurghonteppa

- Tajik League (1): 2009

Istiklol

- Tajik Supercup (1): 2010
- Tajik Cup (1): 2003

Regar-TadAZ

- Tajik Cup (1): 2012

Ravshan Kulob

- Tajik League (1): 2013
