= 2013 Tajik League =

Tajik League
- Season: 2013
- Champions: Ravshan Kulob
- AFC Cup: Ravshan Kulob

The 2013 Tajik League started on 6 April 2013 and ended on 17 November 2013.

== Teams ==
Locations of teams in the 2014 Tajik League

Team	Location	Venue	Capacity
CSKA Pomir Dushanbe	Dushanbe	CSKA Stadium	7,000
Energetik Dushanbe	Dushanbe		
Istaravshan	Istaravshan	Istravshan Arena	20,000
Istiklol	Dushanbe	Pamir Stadium	24,000
Khayr Vahdat	Vahdat		
Khujand	Khujand	20-Letie Nezavisimosti Stadium	20,000
Parvoz Bobojon Ghafurov	Ghafurov		
Ravshan	Kulob	Kulob Central Stadium	20,000
Regar-TadAZ	Tursunzoda	Stadium Metallurg 1st District	20,000
Vakhsh	Qurghonteppa	Tsentralnyi Stadium	10,000

== League table ==
Pos	Team	Pld	W	D	L	GF	GA	GD	Pts	Qualification
1	Ravshan Kulob (C)	18	14	4	0	26	5	+21	46	AFC Cup
2	Istiklol	18	14	1	3	47	8	+39	43	
3	Khayr Vahdat	18	9	7	2	26	14	+12	34	
4	Regar-TadAZ	18	10	3	5	26	18	+8	33	
5	Khujand	18	6	5	7	17	21	−4	23	
6	Parvoz	18	4	7	7	14	29	−15	19	
7	Vakhsh	18	4	4	10	11	17	−6	16	
8	Energetik Dushanbe	18	4	4	10	13	23	−10	16	
9	CSKA Pamir Dushanbe	18	2	5	11	10	26	−16	11	
10	Istaravshan	18	2	2	14	13	42	−29	8	
11	Panjshir	0	0	0	0	0	0	0	0 (Note: Panjshir withdrew or disqualified from the league; all results annulled.)	

Updated to match(es) played on 17 November 2013. Source: Soccerway
Rules for classification: 1) points; 2) goal difference; 3) number of goals scored.
(C) Champions

== Top scorers ==
Rank	Player	Club	Goals
1	(Iran) Hossein Sohrabi	Khayr/Istiklol	11
2	(Tajikistan) Dilshod Vasiev	Istiklol	10
3	(Russia) Aleksandr Kudryashov	Istiklol	7
3	(Tajikistan) Hasan Rustamov	Ravshan	7
5	(Tajikistan) Mirzobek Mirzoev	Khayr	6

=== Hat-tricks ===
Player	For	Against	Result	Date
(Russia) Aleksandr Kudryashov	Istiklol	Istaravshan	9–0	8 June 2013
(Tajikistan) Dilshod Vasiev	Istiklol	Parvoz Bobojon Ghafurov	6–0	30 October 2013
