= Khurshed Makhmudov =

Tajikistani footballer

Khurshed Mahmudov
Personal information
- Full name: Khurshed Mahmudov
- Date of birth: 8 August 1982 (age 44)
- Place of birth: Dushanbe, Tajikistan
- Height: 1.76 m (5 ft 9 in)
- Position: Midfielder

Team information
- Current team: Regar-TadAZ

Senior career*
Years	Team	Apps	(Gls)
2001	Varzob Dushanbe		
2002–2013	Regar-TadAZ		
2014–2016	Istiklol	30	(10)
2016	Barki Tajik		
2017–	Regar-TadAZ		

International career^{‡}
2004–2016	Tajikistan	42	(4)
- * Club domestic league appearances and goals as of 27 September 2017 ‡ National team caps and goals as of 17 March 2016

Khurshed Mahmudov (born 8 August 1982) is a Tajikistani footballer who plays Tajik League side Regar-TadAZ Tursunzoda, and is a former member of the Tajikistan national football team.

== Career ==
In February 2014, after 12 years with Regar-TadAZ Tursunzoda, Makhmudov signed for FC Istiklol. After two seasons, and 52 appearances for Istiklol, Makhmudov's contract wasn't renewed in January 2016 and he left Istiklol.

In February 2017, Makhmudov switched to Futsal, joining DISI Invest. After six-months with DISI Invest, Makhmudov returned to football, signing with Regar-TadAZ Tursunzoda.

== Career statistics ==
=== Club ===
As of match played 28 November 2015

Club	Season	League			National Cup		Continental		Other		Total	
Club	Season	Division	Apps	Goals	Apps	Goals	Apps	Goals	Apps	Goals	Apps	Goals
Istiklol	2014	Tajik League	16	7	5	1	–		1	0	22	8
Istiklol	2015	Tajik League	14	3	4	1	11	4	1	1	30	9
Istiklol	Total		30	10	9	2	10	4	2	1	52	17
Career total			30	10	9	2	10	4	2	1	52	17

=== International ===
Tajikistan national team
Year	Apps	Goals
2004	1	0
2005	0	0
2006	7	3
2007	5	0
2008	0	0
2009	1	0
2010	5	0
2011	5	0
2012	2	0
2013	3	1
2014	4	0
2015	7	0
2016	2	0
Total	42	4

Statistics accurate as of match played 29 March 2016

=== International Goals ===
#	Date	Venue	Opponent	Score	Result	Competition
1.	2 April 2006	Bangabandhu Stadium, Dhaka, Bangladesh	Macau	1–0	4–0	2006 AFC Challenge Cup
2.	10 April 2006	Bangabandhu Stadium, Dhaka, Bangladesh	Bangladesh	2–1	6–1	2006 AFC Challenge Cup
3.	16 April 2006	Bangabandhu Stadium, Dhaka, Bangladesh	Sri Lanka	0–2	0–4	2006 AFC Challenge Cup
4.	17 March 2013	Spartak Stadium, Bishkek, Kyrgyzstan	Pakistan	1–0	1–0	2014 AFC Challenge Cup qualification

== Honours ==
Regar-TadAZ

- Tajik League: 2002, 2003, 2004, 2006, 2007, 2008
- Tajik Cup: 2005, 2006, 2011, 2012
- AFC President's Cup: 2009

Istiklol

- Tajik League: 2014, 2015
- Tajik Cup: 2014, 2015
- Tajik Supercup: 2014, 2015

Tajikistan

- AFC Challenge Cup: 2006
