= Romish Jalilov =

Tajikistani footballer

Personal information
- Full name: Romish Jalilov (Tajik: Ромиш Джалилов)
- Date of birth: 21 November 1995 (age 30)
- Place of birth: Tajikistan
- Height: 1.80 m (5 ft 11 in)
- Position: Midfielder

Team information
- Current team: Istiklol
- Number: 21

Senior career*
Years	Team	Apps	(Gls)
2012–2018	Istiklol		
2015–2016	→ Regar-TadAZ (loan)		
2020–2021	Istiklol	8	(0)
2022	Ravshan Kulob		
2023–2024	Istiklol	19	(1)
2024	Khosilot Farkhor	13	(1)
2025–	Istiklol	14	(1)

International career^{‡}
2014–	Tajikistan	6	(0)
- * Club domestic league appearances and goals as of 12:12, 25 November 2025 (UTC) ‡ National team caps and goals as of 27 March 2018

Romish Jalilov (born 21 November 1995) is a Tajik professional footballer who plays as a midfielder for Istiklol and the Tajikistan national team.

== Career ==
In March 2015 Jalilov joined Regar-TadAZ on a half-season loan deal. Jalilov also spent the 2016 season on loan at Regar-TadAZ, returning to Istiklol on 26 December 2016.

During the 2020 Tajikistan Higher League season summer transfer window, Jalilov was reregistered with FC Istiklol.

On 26 February 2024, Istiklol confirmed the departure of Jalilov at the end of his contract, alongside Shahrom Sulaymonov, and that he had signed for Khosilot Farkhor.

On 19 February 2025, Istiklol announced the return of Jalilov and Shahrom Sulaymonov from Khosilot Farkhor.

== Career statistics ==
=== Club ===
As of match played 10 November 2025

Club	Season	League			National Cup		Continental		Other		Total	
Club	Season	Division	Apps	Goals	Apps	Goals	Apps	Goals	Apps	Goals	Apps	Goals
Istiklol	2012	Tajik League					1	0	–		1	0
Istiklol	2013	Tajik League	5	0			–		–		5	0
Istiklol	2014	Tajik League	17	6	6	1	–		1	1	24	8
Istiklol	2015	Tajik League	14	3	5	1	1	0	0	0	20	4
Istiklol	2016	Tajik League	0	0	0	0	–		–		0	0
Istiklol	2017	Tajik League	16	1	3	1	10	1	1	0	30	3
Istiklol	2018	Tajik League	9	2	0	0	6	1	1	0	16	3
Istiklol	Total		61	12	15	3	18	2	3	1	97	18
Regar-TadAZ (loan)	2015	Tajik League					–		–			
Regar-TadAZ (loan)	2016	Tajik League					–		–			
Regar-TadAZ (loan)	Total						-	-	-	-		
Istiklol	2020	Tajikistan Higher League	5	0	1	0	0	0	0	0	6	0
Istiklol	2021	Tajikistan Higher League	3	0	0	0	0	0	0	0	3	0
Istiklol	Total		8	0	1	0	0	0	0	0	9	0
Ravshan Kulob	2022	Tajikistan Higher League					–		–			
Istiklol	2023	Tajikistan Higher League	19	1	3	0	5	0	1	0	28	1
Khosilot Farkhor	2024	Tajikistan Higher League	13	1			–		–		13	1
Istiklol	2025	Tajikistan Higher League	14	1	2	0	1	0	1	0	18	1
Career total			115	15	21	3	24	2	5	1	165	21

=== International ===
Tajikistan national team
Year	Apps	Goals
2014	2	0
2015	0	0
2016	0	0
2017	3	0
2018	1	0
Total	6	0

Statistics accurate as of match played 27 March 2018

== Honors ==
Istiklol

- Tajik League: 2014, 2015, 2017, 2023
- Tajik Cup: 2013, 2014, 2023
- Tajik Supercup: 2014, 2018
