= 2016 Tajik League =

Tajik League
- Season: 2016
- Champions: Istiklol
- AFC Cup: Istiklol; Khosilot Farkhor
- Matches: 90
- Goals: 301 (3.34 per match)
- Top goalscorer: Manuchekhr Dzhalilov (22)
- Biggest home win: Istiklol 10-1 Khujand
- Biggest away win: Ravshan Kulob 0-5 Barkchi
- Highest scoring: Istiklol 10-1 Khujand

The 2016 Tajik League is the 25th season of Tajik League, the Tajikistan Football Federation's top division of association football. FC Istiklol are the defending champions, having won the previous season.

== Teams ==
Prior to the start of the 2016 season, Khosilot Farkhor were promoted, whilst on 25 March 2016, the Tajikistan Football Federation announced that Daleron-Uroteppa had withdrawn from the league due to financial problems.

Locations of teams in the 2015 Tajik League

Team	Location	Venue	Capacity
Barkchi	Hisor	Central Republican Stadium	24,000
CSKA Pomir Dushanbe	Dushanbe	CSKA Stadium	7,000
Istiklol	Dushanbe	Central Republican Stadium	24,000
Khayr Vahdat	Vahdat		
Hosilot Farkhor	Farkhar	Central Stadium	
Khujand	Khujand	20-Letie Nezavisimosti Stadium	20,000
Parvoz Bobojon Ghafurov	Ghafurov	Furudgoh Stadium	5,000
Ravshan	Kulob	Kulob Central Stadium	20,000
Regar-TadAZ	Tursunzoda	Stadium Metallurg 1st District	20,000
Vakhsh	Qurghonteppa	Tsentralnyi Stadium	10,000

== League table ==
Pos	Team	Pld	W	D	L	GF	GA	GD	Pts	Qualification or relegation
1	Istiklol (C)	18	14	3	1	67	20	+47	45	2017 AFC Cup
2	Khosilot Farkhor	18	11	4	3	40	16	+24	37	2017 AFC Cup
3	Regar-TadAZ	18	10	2	6	36	23	+13	32	
4	Barki Tajik	18	9	2	7	32	25	+7	29	
5	Khayr Vahdat	18	8	5	5	29	25	+4	29	
6	CSKA Pamir Dushanbe	18	8	3	7	23	16	+7	27	
7	Khujand	18	8	1	9	22	37	−15	25	
8	Vakhsh	18	5	3	10	21	39	−18	18	
9	Ravshan Kulob (R)	18	2	3	13	17	50	−33	9	Relegation
10	Parvoz (R)	18	1	2	15	14	50	−36	5	Relegation

Updated to match(es) played on 14 November 2016. Source: Fifa
Rules for classification: 1) points; 2) goal difference; 3) number of goals scored.
(C) Champions; (R) Relegated

=== Results ===
Home \ Away	BTD	CPD	KVA	KHO	KJD	IST	PBG	RAV	RZD	VAK
Barki Tajik		0–1	2–1	3–1	3–2	1–5	3–0	2–0	2–1	4–0
CSKA Pamir	2–0		1–1	1–0	0–1	0–0	3–0	3–1	0–1	2–0
Khayr Vahdat	1–0	0–0		0–0	4–1	0–0	3–0	4–0	0–1	1–0
Khosilot Farkhor	2–2	2–1	6–0		1–0	1–1	1–0	4–0	4–0	3–2
Khujand	1–1	2–1	1–5	0–1		0–2	1–0	1–0	0–2	2–1
Istiklol	4–2	2–1	4–1	2–1	10–1		8–2	7–1	3–1	6–3
Parvoz Bobojon Ghafurov	1–2	0–2	2–3	1–5	0–4	0–4		1–3	1–0	0–0
Ravshan Kulob	0–5	1–2	1–3	0–2	2–3	2–1	3–3		1–1	1–2
Regar-TadAZ	1–0	2–1	5–1	2–2	3–0	2–3	3–2	5–0		5–1
Vakhsh Qurghonteppa	2–0	3–2	0–0	0–3	1–2	1–5	2–1	1–1	2–1	

Updated to match(es) played on 14 November 2016. Source: Soccerway
Legend: Blue = home team win; Yellow = draw; Red = away team win.

== Season statistics ==
=== Scoring ===
- First goal of the season: Siyovush Asrorov for Istiklol against Parvoz Bobojon Ghafurov (7 April 2016)

=== Top scorers ===
As of Match played 30 October 2016

Rank	Player	Club	Goals
1	(Tajikistan) Manuchekhr Dzhalilov	Istiklol	22
2	(Tajikistan) Kamil Saidov	Barki Tajik/Khosilot Farkhor	12
3	(Tajikistan) Fatkhullo Fatkhuloev	Istiklol	10
3	(Tajikistan) Romish Jalilov	Regar-TadAZ	10
5	(Ghana) Jones Agbley	Khayr Vahdat	8
5	(Tajikistan) Komron Tursunov	Regar-TadAZ	8
5	(Tajikistan) Dilshod Bozorov	Khujand	8
5	(Tajikistan) Akhtam Khamrakulov	Vakhsh Qurghonteppa/Regar-TadAZ	8
9	(Tajikistan) Jahongir Aliev	Istiklol	7
9	(Ghana) David Mawutor	Istiklol	7
9	(Tajikistan) Nuriddin Khamrokul	Barki Tajik	7
9	(Tajikistan) Navruz Rustamov	Khosilot Farkhor	7

=== Hat-tricks ===
Player	For	Against	Result	Date	Ref
(Ghana) Jones Agbley	Khayr Vahdat	Ravshan Kulob	4-0	10 April 2016	
(Tajikistan) Kamil Saidov^{5}	Khosilot Farkhor	Khayr Vahdat	6-0	14 August 2016	
(Ghana) David Mawutor	Istiklol	Khujand	10-1	18 September 2016	
(Tajikistan) Manuchekhr Dzhalilov	Istiklol	Khujand	10-1	18 September 2016	
(Tajikistan) Amirdzhon Safarov	Barki Tajik	Vakhsh	4-0	25 September 2016	
(Tajikistan) Manuchekhr Dzhalilov^{5}	Istiklol	Parvoz	8-2	10 October 2016	

- ^{5} Player scored 5 goals
