= Rahmonali Barotov =

Tajikistani footballer

Personal information
- Full name: Rahmonali Barotov
- Date of birth: 10 March 1987 (age 39)
- Position: Midfielder

Team information
- Current team: Regar-TadAZ Tursunzoda

Senior career*
Years	Team	Apps	(Gls)
2005–	Regar-TadAZ Tursunzoda		

International career
2004–	Tajikistan		
- * Club domestic league appearances and goals

Rahmonali Barotov (born 10 March 1987) is a Tajikistani footballer who plays for Regar-TadAZ Tursunzoda. He is a member of the Tajikistan national football team in the 2010 FIFA World Cup qualification campaign.

== International goals ==
#	Date	Venue	Opponent	Score	Result	Competition
1.	22 August 2007	Dushanbe, Tajikistan	Azerbaijan	2–3	Lost	Friendly
