= Yusuf Rabiev =

Tajikistani footballer (born 1979)

Personal information
- Date of birth: 25 May 1979 (age 47)
- Place of birth: Dushanbe, Tajik SSR, Soviet Union
- Height: 1.76 m (5 ft 9 in)
- Position: Striker

Senior career*
| Years | Team | Apps | (Gls) |
| 1998–2000 | Varzob Dushanbe | | |
| 2001 | Regar-TadAZ | | |
| 2004–2007 | Parvoz | | |
| 2008 | Vakhsh Qurghonteppa | | |
| 2008 | Khujand | | |
| 2009–2012 | Istiklol | | (83) |
| 2013 | Khujand | | |
| 2014–2015 | Parvoz | | |

International career
| 2003–2015 | Tajikistan | 40 | (15) |
- * Club domestic league appearances and goals

Yusuf Rabiev (born 25 May 1979) is a Tajikistani former footballer who coaches a youth team of Istiklol. A striker, he made 40 appearances for the Tajikistan national team scoring 15 goals.

== Career ==
Rabiev won the 2006 AFC Challenge Cup with the Tajik national team, scoring four goals in the tournament including a brace against Kyrgyzstan in the semi-final. Earlier he had played at the 2006 World Cup qualifiers, however Tajikistan failed to get behind the first stage. During the Qualification for the AFC Challenge Cup 2008 he helped Tajikistan to edge Philippines and qualify for the final tournament, where he scored a hat-trick against Afghanistan as his team won 4–0.

== Career statistics ==
Tajikistan
| Year | Apps | Goals |
|---|---|---|
| 2003 | 7 | 1 |
| 2004 | 3 | 1 |
| 2005 | 0 | 0 |
| 2006 | 6 | 4 |
| 2007 | 0 | 0 |
| 2008 | 8 | 7 |
| 2009 | 1 | 0 |
| 2010 | 5 | 2 |
| 2011 | 4 | 0 |
| 2012 | 4 | 0 |
| 2013 | 2 | 0 |
| Total | 40 | 15 |

Statistics accurate as of match played 19 March 2013

Scores and results list Tajikistan's goal tally first.

| # | Date | Venue | Opponent | Score | Result | Competition |
|---|---|---|---|---|---|---|
| 1. | 30 November 2003 | Pamir Stadium, Dushanbe, Tajikistan | Bangladesh | 2–0 | 2–0 | 2006 FIFA World Cup qualification |
| 2. | 13 October 2004 | Pamir Stadium, Dushanbe, Tajikistan | Kyrgyzstan | 1–0 | 2–1 | 2006 FIFA World Cup qualification |
| 3. | 2 April 2006 | Bangabandhu National Stadium, Dhaka, Bangladesh | Macau | 2–0 | 4–0 | 2006 AFC Challenge Cup |
| 4. | 10 April 2006 | Bangabandhu National Stadium, Dhaka, Bangladesh | Bangladesh | 5–1 | 6–1 | 2006 AFC Challenge Cup |
| 5. | 13 April 2006 | Bangabandhu National Stadium, Dhaka, Bangladesh | Kyrgyzstan | 1–0 | 2–0 | 2006 AFC Challenge Cup |
| 6. | 13 April 2006 | Bangabandhu National Stadium, Dhaka, Bangladesh | Kyrgyzstan | 2–0 | 2–0 | 2006 AFC Challenge Cup |
| 7. | 13 May 2008 | Barotac Nuevo Plaza Field, Barotac Nuevo, Philippines | Bhutan | 2–0 | 3–1 | 2008 AFC Challenge Cup qualification |
| 8. | 17 May 2008 | Iloilo Sports Complex, Iloilo City, Philippines | Brunei | 1–0 | 4–0 | 2008 AFC Challenge Cup qualification |
| 9. | 17 May 2008 | Iloilo Sports Complex, Iloilo City, Philippines | Brunei | 4–0 | 4–0 | 2008 AFC Challenge Cup qualification |
| 10. | 1 August 2008 | Gachibowli Athletic Stadium, Hyderabad, India | India | 1–0 | 1–1 | 2008 AFC Challenge Cup |
| 11. | 3 August 2008 | Lal Bahadur Shastri Stadium, Hyderabad, India | Afghanistan | 1–0 | 4–0 | 2008 AFC Challenge Cup |
| 12. | 3 August 2008 | Lal Bahadur Shastri Stadium, Hyderabad, India | Afghanistan | 3–0 | 4–0 | 2008 AFC Challenge Cup |
| 13. | 3 August 2008 | Lal Bahadur Shastri Stadium, Hyderabad, India | Afghanistan | 4–0 | 4–0 | 2008 AFC Challenge Cup |
| 14. | 16 February 2010 | Sugathadasa Stadium, Colombo, Sri Lanka | Bangladesh | 1–1 | 1–2 | 2010 AFC Challenge Cup |
| 15. | 20 February 2010 | CR & FC Grounds, Colombo, Sri Lanka | Myanmar | 3–0 | 3–0 | 2010 AFC Challenge Cup |

== Honours ==
Varzob Dushanbe

- Tajik League: 1998, 1999, 2000
- Tajik Cup: 1998, 1999

Regar-TadAZ

- Tajik League: 2001
- Tajik Cup: 2001

Parvoz Bobojon Ghafurov

- Tajik Cup: 2004, 2007

Khujand

- Tajik Cup: 2008

Istiklol

- Tajik League: 2010, 2011
- Tajik Cup: 2009, 2010
- Tajik Supercup: 2010
- AFC President's Cup: 2012

Tajikistan

- AFC Challenge Cup: 2006

Individual

- Tajik League top scorer: 2010
