= Sokhib Suvonkulov =

Tajikistani footballer (born 1988)

Sohib Savankulov
Personal information
- Date of birth: 15 September 1988 (age 38)
- Place of birth: Tajik SSR, Soviet Union
- Height: 1.86 m (6 ft 1 in)
- Position: Defender

Senior career*
Years	Team	Apps	(Gls)
2006–2009	Vakhsh		
2009–2013	Istiklol		
2013	Ravan Baku	7	(1)
2014–2017	Istiklol	10	(1)
2014	→ Vakhsh (loan)		
2016	→ Barkchi (loan)		
2017	Regar-TadAZ		

International career
2007–2015	Tajikistan	40	(1)
- * Club domestic league appearances and goals

Sokhib Suvonkulov (Tajik: Соҳиб Сувонқулов; born 15 September 1988) is a Tajikistani former footballer who played as a defender.

== Club career ==
Suvonkulov played for both Vakhsh Qurghonteppa and FC Istiklol before signing for Azerbaijan Premier League side Ravan Baku in August 2013. Suvonkulov made his debut for Ravan Baku in their 3–0 away defeat to Gabala on 20 September 2013, playing all 90 minutes. His first goal for Ravan came on 4 October 2013 in a 1–1 home draw against Khazar Lankaran. Suvonkulov left Ravan in December 2013.

After six-months recovering from an Inflamed Liver, Suvonkulov began train with former club FC Istiklol in July 2014, going on to sign with them before being loaned out to Vakhsh for the remainder of the 2014 season, returning to Istiklol in January 2015.

In December 2015, Suvonkulov underwent surgery to repair the ruptured anterior cruciate ligament in his right knee, returning to light training in April 2016, and then full training with Istiklol in July 2016.

In August 2017, Suvonkulov terminated his contract with Istiklol by mutual consent, being linked with Vakhsh Qurghonteppa, before signing with Regar-TadAZ Tursunzoda.

== International career ==
Suvonkulov played for Tajikistan in 2008 AFC Challenge Cup, 2010 AFC Challenge Cup, 2012 AFC Challenge Cup.

== Career statistics ==
=== Club ===
As of match played 29 June 2017

Appearances and goals by club, season and competition
Club	Season	League			National Cup		Continental		Other		Total	
Club	Season	Division	Apps	Goals	Apps	Goals	Apps	Goals	Apps	Goals	Apps	Goals
Istiklol	2013	Tajik League	8	1			–		–		8	1
Ravan Baku	2013–14	Azerbaijan Premier League	7	1	1	0	–		–		8	1
Istiklol	2014	Tajik League	0	0	0	0	–		–		0	0
Istiklol	2015	Tajik League	4	1	0	0	1	0	1	0	6	1
Istiklol	2016	Tajik League	0	0	0	0	–		–		0	0
Istiklol	2017	Tajik League	6	0	0	0	0	0	1	0	7	0
Istiklol	Total		10	1	0	0	1	0	2	0	13	1
Vakhsh (loan)	2014	Tajik League					–		–			
Barkchi (loan)	2016	Tajik League					–		–			
Career total			23	2	3	0	1	0	1	0	26	2

=== International ===
Tajikistan football team
Year	Apps	Goals
2007	1	0
2008	8	0
2009	1	0
2010	6	0
2011	11	0
2012	6	1
2013	2	0
2014	2	0
2015	3	0
Total	40	1

Statistics accurate as of match played 16 June 2015

#	Date	Venue	Opponent	Score	Result	Competition
1	November 6, 2012	Azadi Stadium, Tehran	Iran	1–5	1–6	Friendly

== Honours ==
Istiklol

- Tajik League: 2015
- AFC President's Cup: 2012
- Tajik Supercup : 2015
