= Fathullo Boboev =

Tajik footballer (born 1997)

Personal information
- Date of birth: 9 October 1997 (age 29)
- Place of birth: Kulob, Tajikistan
- Position: Goalkeeper

Team information
- Current team: Khosilot Farkhor

Senior career*
Years	Team	Apps	(Gls)
2016–2017	Khosilot Farkhor		
2018	Khatlon		
2019	Regar-TadAZ		
2020	Fayzkand	5	(0)
2020–2021	Regar-TadAZ		
2022	Istaravshan		
2023–	Khosilot Farkhor		

International career^{‡}
2018–	Tajikistan	1	(0)
- * Club domestic league appearances and goals as of 12:01, 9 October 2020 (UTC) ‡ National team caps and goals as of 07:48, 19 December 2018 (UTC)

Fathullo Boboev (born 9 October 1997) is a Tajikistani professional football player who currently plays for Khosilot Farkhor.

== Career ==
=== International ===
Boboev made his senior team debut on 16 December 2018 against Oman.

== Career statistics ==
=== International ===
Tajikistan national team
Year	Apps	Goals
2018	1	0
Total	1	0

Statistics accurate as of match played 13 December 2018
