= 2010 Tajik League =

Tajik League
- Season: 2010
- Champions: Istiklol
- AFC President's Cup: Istiklol
- Top goalscorer: Yusuf Rabiev (30)

The 2010 Tajik League was the 19th season of the Tajik League, the Tajikistan Football Federation's top division of association football. Vakhsh Qurghonteppa were the defending champions, having won the previous season, but would lose their title to Istiklol.

== Teams ==
Locations of teams in the 2014 Tajik League

Team	Location	Venue	Capacity
CSKA Pamir Dushanbe	Dushanbe	Central Republican Stadium	24,000
Energetik Dushanbe	Dushanbe	Central Republican Stadium	24,000
Istiklol	Dushanbe	Central Republican Stadium	24,000
Khayr Vahdat	Vahdat	Khair Stadium	8,000
Khujand	Khujand	20-Letie Nezavisimosti Stadium	25,000
Parvoz Bobojon Ghafurov	Ghafurov	Furudgoh Stadium	5,000
Ravshan Kulob	Kulob	Kulob Central Stadium	20,000
Regar-TadAZ	Tursunzoda	Stadium Metallurg 1st District	10,000
Vakhsh Qurghonteppa	Qurghonteppa	Tsentralnyi Stadium	10,000

== League standings ==
Pos	Team	Pld	W	D	L	GF	GA	GD	Pts	Qualification or relegation
1	Istiqlol Dushanbe (C)	32	26	6	0	76	17	+59	84	2011 AFC President's Cup
2	Regar-TadAZ	32	22	5	5	81	24	+57	71	
3	Vakhsh	32	16	8	8	42	27	+15	56	
4	Khayr Vahdat FK	32	16	6	10	59	42	+17	54	
5	Energetik Dushanbe	32	12	4	16	41	44	−3	40	
6	SKA-Pamir Dushanbe	32	9	10	13	35	51	−16	37	
7	FK Khujand	32	8	8	16	42	58	−16	32	
8	Parvoz	32	6	6	20	35	71	−36	24	
9	Ravshan Kulob	32	1	3	28	18	95	−77	6	

Updated to match(es) played on unknown. Source:
Rules for classification: 1) points; 2) goal difference; 3) number of goals scored.
(C) Champions
