= Alisher Tuychiev =

Tajikistani footballer

Personal information
- Date of birth: 8 March 1976 (age 50)
- Place of birth: Tajik SSR, Soviet Union
- Height: 1.82 m (5 ft 11 1/2 in)
- Position: Goalkeeper

Senior career*
Years	Team	Apps	(Gls)
1996	Yangiyer	22	(0)
1997–1999	Nasaf Qarshi	26	(0)
1999	Yangiyer	9	(0)
2000	Guliston	32	(0)
2002	Mashʼal Mubarek	4	(0)
2007	Parvoz Bobojon Ghafurov		
2008–2009	Metallurg Bekabad	13	(0)
2010	Vakhsh Qurghonteppa		
2011–2015	Istiklol		
2016	Khujand		

International career^{‡}
2014	Tajikistan U23	4	(0)
2008–2016	Tajikistan	42	(0)
- * Club domestic league appearances and goals as of 4 January 2016 ‡ National team caps and goals as of 24 March 2016

Alisher Tuychiev (Tajik: Алишер Тӯйчиев; born 8 March 1976) is a Tajikistani football player of Uzbek descent.

== Career ==
=== Club ===
Tuychiev was released by FC Istiklol at the end of the 2015 season. On 4 January 2016, Tuychiev was registered by FK Khujand for their 2016 AFC Cup campaign.

== Career statistics ==
=== Club ===
As of match played 22 November 2015

Club	Season	League			National Cup		Continental		Other		Total	
Club	Season	Division	Apps	Goals	Apps	Goals	Apps	Goals	Apps	Goals	Apps	Goals
Istiklol	2011	Tajik League					2	0	0	0	2	0
Istiklol	2012	Tajik League					5	0	1	0	6	0
Istiklol	2013	Tajik League	16	0			–		–		5	0
Istiklol	2014	Tajik League	11	0	4	0	–		1	0	16	0
Istiklol	2015	Tajik League	10	0	4	0	1	0	0	0	15	0
Istiklol	Total		37	0	8	0	8	0	2	0	55	0
Career total			37	0	8	0	8	0	2	0	55	0

=== International ===
Tajikistan national team
Year	Apps	Goals
2008	8	0
2010	5	0
2011	9	0
2012	6	0
2013	3	0
2014	5	0
2015	5	0
2016	1	0
Total	42	0

Statistics accurate as of match played 24 March 2016

== Honours ==
=== Club ===
Parvoz Bobojon Ghafurov

- Tajik Cup (1): 2007

Istiklol

- Tajik League (3): 2011, 2014, 2015
- Tajik Cup (2): 2013, 2014
- AFC President's Cup (1): 2012
- Tajik Supercup (1) : 2014
