= Eraj Rajabov =

Tajikistani footballer

Personal information
- Full name: Eraj Hajdarovich Rajabov (Tajik: Эраҷ Раҷабов)
- Date of birth: 9 November 1990 (age 36)
- Place of birth: Dushanbe, Tajikistan
- Height: 1.84 m (6 ft 0 in)
- Position: Defender

Team information
- Current team: Ravshan Zafarobod

Senior career*
Years	Team	Apps	(Gls)
2007–2009	Dynamo Dushanbe		
2009–2015	Istiklol		
2016	Khujand	0	(0)
2016	Khayr Vahdat		
2016–2017	Khosilot Farkhor		
2018–2019	Khatlon		
2020	Fayzkand	7	(0)
2020	Kuktosh	8	(0)
2021	Dushanbe-83	5	(0)
2022–	Ravshan Zafarobod		

International career^{‡}
2007	Tajikistan U17		
2008–	Tajikistan	44	(0)
- * Club domestic league appearances and goals as of 5 May 2022 ‡ National team caps and goals as of 13 November 2016

Eraj Rajabov (Tajik: Эраҷ Раҷабов; born 9 November 1990) is a Tajikistani footballer who plays for Ravshan Zafarobod, and the Tajikistan national football team.

== Career ==
=== Club ===
Previously, Rajabov played for Dinamo Dushanbe.

Rajabov was released by FC Istiklol at the end of the 2015 season. On 4 January 2016, Rajabov was registered by FK Khujand for their 2016 AFC Cup campaign. Rajabov played the first league game of the season for Khayr Vahdat.

On 31 March 2020, Rajabov was listed in FK Fayzkand's squad for the 2020 Tajikistan Higher League season.

On 31 March 2021, Rajabov was listed in FC Dushanbe-83's squad for the 2021 Tajikistan Higher League season.

On 1 April 2022, Rajabov was listed in Ravshan Zafarobod's squad for the 2022 Tajikistan Higher League season.

=== International ===
He played for Tajikistan in 2007 FIFA U-17 World Cup, 2008 AFC Challenge Cup, 2012 AFC Challenge Cup.

== Career statistics ==
=== Club ===
As of match played 9 February 2016

Club performance			League		Cup		Continental		Other		Total	
Season	Club	League	Apps	Goals	Apps	Goals	Apps	Goals	Apps	Goals	Apps	Goals
Istiklol	2009	Tajik League					–		–			
Istiklol	2010	Tajik League					–		1	0	1	0
Istiklol	2011	Tajik League					5	0	1	0	1	0
Istiklol	2012	Tajik League					5	0	1	0	6	0
Istiklol	2013	Tajik League	17	0	3	0	–		–		20	0
Istiklol	2014	Tajik League	12	0	6	0	–		1	0	19	0
Istiklol	2015	Tajik League	9	0	4	0	6	0	0	0	19	0
Istiklol	Total		38	0	13	0	16	0	4	0	71	0
Khujand	2016	Tajik League	0	0	0	0	1	0	–		1	0
Career total			38	0	13	0	17	0	4	0	72	0

=== International ===
Tajikistan national team
Year	Apps	Goals
2008	8	0
2009	1	0
2010	5	0
2011	7	0
2012	4	0
2013	2	0
2014	5	0
2015	4	0
2016	8	0
Total	44	0

Statistics accurate as of match played 13 November 2016

== Honors ==
Istiklol

- Tajik League: 2010, 2011, 2014, 2015
- Tajik Cup: 2009, 2010, 2013, 2014
- Tajik Supercup: 2014
