= Kamil Saidov =

Tajikistani footballer

Personal information
- Full name: Kamil Saidov
- Date of birth: 25 January 1989 (age 37)
- Place of birth: Tajik SSR
- Height: 1.80 m (5 ft 11 in)
- Position: Striker

Team information
- Current team: Khosilot Farkhor

Senior career*
Years	Team	Apps	(Gls)
2007	Hima Dushanbe		
2007–2008	Vakhsh		
2009–2010	Regar-TadAZ		
2011–2012	CSKA Pamir Dushanbe		
2013	Regar-TadAZ		
2014	Istiklol	16	(7)
2015	Regar-TadAZ		(9)
2016	Barki Tajik		
2016–	Khosilot Farkhor		

International career^{‡}
2006–	Tajikistan	33	(4)
- * Club domestic league appearances and goals as of 15 August 2015 ‡ National team caps and goals as of 6 October 2016

Kamil Saidov (born 25 January 1989) is a Tajikistani footballer who plays for Barki Tajik. He is a member of the Tajikistan national football team in the 2010 FIFA World Cup qualification campaign.

== Career ==
In January 2014, Saidov joined FC Istiklol, going on to make 15 league appearances and scoring 7 goals, before leaving the club in December of the same year.

On 14 August 2016, Saidov scored five-goals for Khosilot Farkhor in their 6–0 victory over Khayr Vahdat.

== Career statistics ==
=== International ===
Tajikistan national team
Year	Apps	Goals
2006	4	1
2007	4	2
2008	3	0
2009	1	0
2010	3	0
2011	8	1
2012	4	0
2013	3	0
2014	1	0
2015	1	0
2016	1	0
Total	33	4

Statistics accurate as of match played 5 October 2016

=== International goals ===
#	Date	Venue	Opponent	Score	Result	Competition
1.	2 July 2006	Almaty Central Stadium, Almaty, Kazakhstan	Kazakhstan	3–1	4–1	Friendly
2.	22 August 2007	Pamir Stadium, Dushanbe, Tajikistan	Azerbaijan	2–2	2–3	Friendly
3.	8 September 2007	Almaty Central Stadium, Almaty, Kazakhstan	Kazakhstan	0–1	1–1	Friendly
4.	23 July 2011	King Abdullah Stadium, Amman, Jordan	Syria	1–1	0–3 (Note: FIFA awarded Tajikistan a 3–0 win as a result of Syria fielding the ineligible player George Mourad. The match originally ended 2–1 to Syria.)	2014 FIFA World Cup qualification

== Honours ==
=== Club ===
Regar-TadAZ

- AFC President's Cup (1): 2009

Istiklol

- Tajikistan Higher League (1): 2014
- Tajikistan Cup (1): 2014
- Tajik Supercup (1): 2014

=== International ===
Tajikistan

- AFC Challenge Cup (1): 2006
