= Dilshod Vasiyev =

Tajik footballer

Personal information
- Full name: Dilshod Saidzhonovich Vasiyev
- Date of birth: 12 February 1988 (age 38)
- Place of birth: Dushanbe, Tajik SSR, Soviet Union
- Height: 1.70 m (5 ft 7 in)
- Positions: Attacking midfielder; striker

Senior career*
Years	Team	Apps	(Gls)
2007	Hima Dushanbe		
2008	Mika Yerevan	19	(2)
2008	Energetik Dushanbe		
2009–2019	Istiklol		(55)
2019	Khujand	20	(6)
2020	CSKA Pamir Dushanbe	18	(2)
2020–2021	Rahmatganj MFS	9	(2)
2021	CSKA Pamir Dushanbe		

International career^{‡}
2014	Tajikistan U23	4	(1)
2006–2015	Tajikistan	50	(8)
- * Club domestic league appearances and goals as of 2 August 2021 ‡ National team caps and goals as of 11 October 2017

Dilshod Saidzhonovich Vasiyev (Russian: Дилшод Саиджонович Васиев; born 12 February 1988 in Dushanbe, Soviet Union) is a former Tajik football midfielder.

== Career ==
=== Club ===
During 2008, Vasiyev played for FC Mika in the Armenian Premier League, playing a total of 20 times, 19 in the league.

Vasiyev scored FC Istiklol's first Tajik League goal on 4 April 2009.

In September 2016, Vasiyev was ruled out for three-months with a torn Medial collateral ligament.

On 21 January 2019, Istiklol announced that Vasiyev had left after 10-years with the club.

On 5 February 2019, FK Khujand announced the singing of Vasiyev.

On 31 March 2020, Vasiyev was announced as part of CSKA Pamir Dushanbe's squad for the 2020 season.

== Post-playing career ==
On 15 March 2024, Istiklol announced that Vasiyev would be a member of new Head Coach Nikola Lazarevic's coaching staff.

== Personal life ==
His brother, Farkhod is also a professional footballer.

== Career statistics ==
=== Club ===
As of match played 26 February 2021

Club	Season	League			National Cup		Continental		Other		Total	
Club	Season	Division	Apps	Goals	Apps	Goals	Apps	Goals	Apps	Goals	Apps	Goals
Mika	2008	Armenian Premier League	19	2	0	0	1	0	–		20	2
Energetik Dushanbe	2008	Tajik League		4			–		–			
Istiklol	2009	Tajik League		7			–		–			
Istiklol	2010	Tajik League					–		1	2	1	2
Istiklol	2011	Tajik League					5	1	1	1	6	2
Istiklol	2012	Tajik League		24			5	3	1	0	6	27
Istiklol	2013	Tajik League	17	10			–		–		17	10
Istiklol	2014	Tajik League	17	15	6	11	–		1	1	24	27
Istiklol	2015	Tajik League	13	6	5	4	10	3	0	0	28	13
Istiklol	2016	Tajik League	16	3	6	4	6	0	1	0	29	7
Istiklol	2017	Tajik League	20	16	5	4	11	4	1	0	37	24
Istiklol	2018	Tajik League	21	6	7	4	5	1	1	0	34	11
Istiklol	Total		104	87	29	28	43	12	7	4	183	124
Khujand	2019	Tajikistan Higher League	20	6			8	3	–		28	9
CSKA Pamir Dushanbe	2020	Tajikistan Higher League	18	2	1	0	–		–		19	2
Rahmatganj MFS	2021	Bangladesh Premier League	9	2			–		–		9	2
Career total			170	103	30	28	51	15	7	4	258	150

=== International ===
Tajikistan national team
Year	Apps	Goals
2007	6	1
2008	0	0
2009	0	0
2010	5	0
2011	12	2
2012	5	1
2013	3	0
2014	5	2
2015	8	0
2016	2	0
2017	4	2
Total	50	8

Statistics accurate as of match played 10 October 2017

=== International goals ===
Scores and results list Tajikistan's goal tally first.
As of 5 September 2017

#	Date	Venue	Opponent	Score	Result	Competition	Ref.
1.	28 October 2007	Pamir Stadium, Dushanbe, Tajikistan	Bangladesh	4–0	5–0	2010 FIFA World Cup qualification	
2.	27 March 2011	Sugathadasa Stadium, Colombo, Sri Lanka	Sri Lanka	2–0	2–2	Friendly	
3.	29 March 2011	Sugathadasa Stadium, Colombo, Sri Lanka	Sri Lanka	2–0	2–0	Friendly	
4.	6 September 2012	Audi Sportpark, Ingolstadt, Germany	Qatar	2–0	2–0	Friendly	
5.	7 June 2014	A. Le Coq Arena, Tallinn, Estonia	Estonia	1–0	1–2	Friendly	
6.	8 August 2014	Pamir Stadium, Dushanbe, Tajikistan	Malaysia	2–0	4–1	Friendly	
7.	13 June 2017	Pamir Stadium, Dushanbe, Tajikistan	Philippines	1–3	3–4	2019 AFC Asian Cup qualification	
8.	5 September 2017	Dasarath Rangasala Stadium, Kathmandu, Nepal	Nepal	2–0	2–1	2019 AFC Asian Cup qualification	

=== Non-FIFA International goals ===
As of 10 September 2014

#	Date	Venue	Opponent	Score	Result	Competition
1.	15 October 2013	Bishkek, Kyrgyzstan	Kyrgyzstan	1–4	Won	Friendly match

== Honors ==
Istiklol

- Tajik League (7): 2010, 2011, 2014, 2015, 2016, 2017, 2018
- Tajik Cup (5): 2009, 2010, 2013, 2014, 2016, 2018
- Tajik Supercup (3) : 2014, 2016, 2018
- AFC President's Cup (1): 2012

=== Individual ===
Tajik League Top Goalscorer (3)
2012, 2014, 2017
