= Alisher Dodov =

Tajikistani football player

Personal information
- Full name: Alisher Dodov (Tajik: Алишер Додов)
- Date of birth: 4 August 1981 (age 45)
- Place of birth: Tursunzoda, Tajikistan
- Height: 1.89 m (6 ft 2 in)
- Position: Goalkeeper

Team information
- Current team: Regar-TadAZ
- Number: 16

Senior career*
Years	Team	Apps	(Gls)
2001	Panjshir		
2002	Ravshan		
2003–2017	Regar-TadAZ		

International career
2007–2016	Tajikistan	15	(0)
- * Club domestic league appearances and goals

Alisher Dodov (Tajik: Алишер Додов; born 4 August 1981) is a Tajikistani football player. He plays as goalkeeper for Regar-TadAZ Tursunzoda and for the Tajikistan national football team.

== Career statistics ==
=== International ===
Appearances and goals by national team and year
National team	Year	Apps	Goals
Tajikistan	2007	3	0
Tajikistan	2008	–	
Tajikistan	2009	1	0
Tajikistan	2010	2	0
Tajikistan	2011	2	0
Tajikistan	2012	–	
Tajikistan	2013	1	0
Tajikistan	2014	–	
Tajikistan	2015	3	0
Tajikistan	2016	3	0
Total		15	0
