= 2014 Tajik League =

Tajik League
- Season: 2014
- Champions: Istiklol
- AFC Cup: Istiklol; Khayr Vahdat
- Matches: 90
- Goals: 250 (2.78 per match)
- Top goalscorer: Dilshod Vasiev (15)
- Biggest home win: Istiklol 9-1 Ravshan
- Biggest away win: Ravshan 2-5 Parvoz
- Highest scoring: Istiklol 9-1 Ravshan

The 2014 Tajik League is the 23rd season of Tajik League, the Tajikistan Football Federation's top division of association football. Ravshan Kulob are the defending champions, having won the previous season. The season started on 12 April 2014.

== Teams ==
Locations of teams in the 2014 Tajik League

Team	Location	Venue	Capacity
CSKA Pomir Dushanbe	Dushanbe	CSKA Stadium	7,000
Energetik Dushanbe	Dushanbe		
Daleron-Uroteppa	Istaravshan	Istravshan Arena	20,000
Istiklol	Dushanbe	Pamir Stadium	24,000
Khayr Vahdat	Vahdat		
Khujand	Khujand	20-Letie Nezavisimosti Stadium	20,000
Parvoz Bobojon Ghafurov	Ghafurov		
Ravshan	Kulob	Kulob Central Stadium	20,000
Regar-TadAZ	Tursunzoda	Stadium Metallurg 1st District	20,000
Vakhsh	Qurghonteppa	Tsentralnyi Stadium	10,000

== League table ==
Pos	Team	Pld	W	D	L	GF	GA	GD	Pts	Qualification or relegation
1	FC Istiklol (C)	18	16	2	0	65	10	+55	50	2015 AFC Cup
2	Khayr Vahdat FK	18	11	2	5	27	17	+10	35	2015 AFC Cup Qualifying play-off
3	FK Daleron-Uroteppa	18	9	6	3	20	11	+9	33	
4	FK Khujand	18	9	5	4	24	17	+7	32	
5	Parvoz	18	8	1	9	28	35	−7	25	
6	Regar-TadAZ	18	5	5	8	25	27	−2	20	
7	Energetik Dushanbe	18	5	4	9	17	30	−13	19	
8	CSKA Pamir Dushanbe	18	3	6	9	14	27	−13	15	
9	Vakhsh	18	4	2	12	12	32	−20	14	
10	Ravshan Kulob	18	2	3	13	18	44	−26	9	

Updated to match(es) played on 25 November 2014. Source: Soccerway
Rules for classification: 1) points; 2) goal difference; 3) number of goals scored.
(C) Champions

=== Results ===
Home \ Away	CSKA	ENG	DAU	IST	KHJ	KVD	PBG	RAV	RAZ	VAK
CSKA		0–2	1–1	0–3	0–0	2–2	3–1	2–1	0–3	4–3
Energetik	0–0		0–3	0–3	0–3	0–2	1–0	2–2	3–0	0–1
Daleron-Uroteppa	1–0	1–1		0–3	1–0	0–0	2–0	1–0	2–0	2–0
Istiklol	4–0	2–2	1–1		4–0	5–1	5–1	9–1	1–0	8–0
Khujand	1–0	2–0	0–0	0–2		1–0	3–3	1–0	3–1	1–0
Khayr Vahdat	1–0	3–0	1–0	2–3	2–0		1–0	3–1	2–1	2–0
Parvoz Bobojon Ghafurov	2–1	3–0	1–2	0–5	0–4	2–1		5–2	2–1	1–0
Ravshan	0–0	0–2	1–0	1–2	2–3	1–2	2–5		0–0	1–0
Regar-TadAZ	1–1	2–4	2–2	1–2	1–1	1–0	2–1	5–2		3–0
Vakhsh	1–0	3–0	0–1	0–3	1–1	0–2	0–1	2–1	1–1	

Updated to match(es) played on 25 November 2014. Source:
Legend: Blue = home team win; Yellow = draw; Red = away team win.

== Top scorers ==
As of Match played 16 November 2014

Rank	Player	Club	Goals
1	(Tajikistan) Dilshod Vasiev	Istiklol	15
2	(Tajikistan) Firuz Rakhmatov	Regar-TadAZ	9
3	(Iran) Hossein Sohrabi	Khayr Vahdat	8
4	(Tajikistan) Kamil Saidov	Istiklol	7
4	(Tajikistan) Khurshed Makhmudov	Istiklol	7
6	(Tajikistan) Rustamov Nowruz	Ravshan	6
6	(Guinea) Alia Sylla	CSKA	6
6	(Tajikistan) Farhad Tokhiri	Parvoz	6
6	(Tajikistan) Fatkhullo Fatkhuloev	Istiklol	6
6	(Tajikistan) Romish Jalilov	Istiklol	6
6	(Ghana) Aydoh Napoleon	Khayr Vahdat	6
6	(Tajikistan) Rakhmonov	Regar-TadAZ	6
