= Khayr Vahdat FK =

Khayr Vahdat
- Full name: Khayr Vahdat FK
- Founded: 2009; 17 years ago
- Ground: Khair Stadium; Vahdat, Tajikistan
- Capacity: 8,000 (20,000 after reconstruction)
- Chairman: Kutbiddin Khairov
- Manager: Sharif Nazarov
- League: Tajik League
- 2016: 5th
Home colours

Khayr Vahdat FK is a football club from Vahdat, Tajikistan who have played in the Tajik League, the top division in Tajikistan, since 2010.

== History ==
Sharif Nazarov was appointed as the club's manager on 17 March 2016.

=== Domestic history ===
Season	League									Tajik Cup	Top goalscorer		Manager
Season	Div.	Pos.	Pl.	W	D	L	GS	GA	P	Tajik Cup	Name	League	Manager
2010	1st	4th	32	16	6	10	59	42	54				(Tajikistan) Tokhirjon Muminov
2011	1st	5th	40	17	3	20	61	59	54				(Tajikistan) Tokhirjon Muminov
2012	1st	4th	24	16	4	4	45	27	52	Quarter-finals			(Tajikistan) Tokhirjon Muminov (Tajikistan) Yusuf Abdulloev
2013	1st	3	18	9	7	2	26	14	34				(Tajikistan) Yusuf Abdulloev (Tajikistan) Rustam Khojaev
2014	1st	2	18	11	2	5	27	17	35				(Tajikistan) Rustam Khojaev (Belarus) Pyotr Kachura (Tajikistan) Tokhirjon Muminov
2015	1st	5	18	8	5	5	21	26	29	Last 16	Muhsindzhon Parpiev	4	
2016	1st	5	18	8	5	5	29	25	29	Quarterfinal	Agbley Jones	8	

== Performance in AFC competitions ==
Season	Competition	Round		Club	Score
2015	AFC Cup	Preliminary round	(Bangladesh)	Sheikh Russel	1–0
2015	AFC Cup	Play-off	(Lebanon)	Salam Zgharta	0–3

== Managers ==
- (Tajikistan) Tokhirjon Muminov (2010–2012)
- (Tajikistan) Yusuf Abdulloev (2012–2013)
- (Tajikistan) Rustam Khojaev (2013–2014)
- (Belarus) Pyotr Kachura (2014)
- (Tajikistan) Tokhirjon Muminov (2014–)
