= Ibrahim Rabimov =

Tajikistani footballer

Personal information
- Full name: Ibrahim Rabimov
- Date of birth: 3 August 1987 (age 39)
- Place of birth: Dushanbe, Soviet Union
- Height: 1.80 m (5 ft 11 in)
- Position: Midfielder

Senior career*
Years	Team	Apps	(Gls)
2000	Umed Dushanbe		
2003–2004	FK Danghara		
2004–2005	Parvoz Bobojon		
2006–2010	Regar-TadAZ Tursunzoda		
2011–2013	Istiklol		
2014	Energetik Dushanbe		
2015–2016	Khujand		
2016–2019	Khosilot Farkhor		

International career
2004–2015	Tajikistan	46	(7)
- * Club domestic league appearances and goals as of 20 April 2015

Ibrahim Rabimov (born 3 August 1987) is a retired Tajik professional footballer who played as a midfielder.

== Career statistics ==
=== International ===
Appearances and goals by national team and year
National team	Year	Apps	Goals
Tajikistan	2004	1	0
Tajikistan	2005	–	
Tajikistan	2006	7	2
Tajikistan	2007	4	0
Tajikistan	2008	2	0
Tajikistan	2009	1	1
Tajikistan	2010	7	2
Tajikistan	2011	11	2
Tajikistan	2012	2	0
Tajikistan	2013	4	0
Tajikistan	2014	4	0
Tajikistan	2015	3	0
Total		46	7

Scores and results list Tajikistan's goal tally first, score column indicates score after each Rabimov goal.

List of international goals scored by Ibrohim Rabimov
No.	Date	Venue	Opponent	Score	Result	Competition
1	2 April 2006	Bangabandhu National Stadium, Dhaka, Bangladesh	Macau	3–0	4–0	2006 AFC Challenge Cup
2	10 April 2006	Bangabandhu National Stadium, Dhaka, Bangladesh	Bangladesh	1–0	6–1	2006 AFC Challenge Cup
3	30 December 2009	Althawra Sports City Stadium, Sana'a, Yemen	Yemen	1–0	1–2	Friendly
4	18 February 2010	Sugathadasa Stadium, Colombo, Sri Lanka	Sri Lanka	1–0	3–1	2010 AFC Challenge Cup
5	20 February 2010	CR & FC Grounds, Colombo, Sri Lanka	Myanmar	1–0	3–0	2010 AFC Challenge Cup
6	23 March 2011	National Football Stadium, Malé, Maldives	Cambodia	3–0	3–0	2012 AFC Challenge Cup qualification
7	27 March 2011	Sugathadasa Stadium, Colombo, Sri Lanka	Sri Lanka	1–1	2–2	Friendly

== Honors ==
=== Club ===
Aviator Bobojon Ghafurov/Parvoz Bobojon Ghafurov

- Tajik Cup (1): 2004

Regar-TadAZ Tursunzoda

- Tajik League (3): 2006, 2007, 2008
- Tajik Cup (1): 2006

Istiklol

- Tajik League (1): 2011
- Tajik Cup (1): 2013
- AFC President's Cup (1): 2012

=== International ===
Tajikistan

- AFC Challenge Cup (1): 2006

=== Individual ===
- CIS Cup top goalscorer: 2009 (shared)
