= 2015 Tajik League =

Tajik League
- Season: 2015
- Champions: Istiklol
- AFC Cup: Istiklol; Khujand
- Matches: 90
- Goals: 260 (2.89 per match)
- Biggest home win: Istiklol 8-0 Parvoz; Istiklol 8-0 Khayr
- Biggest away win: Khujand 1-7 Istiklol
- Highest scoring: Istiklol 8-0 Parvoz; Istiklol 8-0 Khayr; Khujand 1-7 Istiklol

The 2015 Tajik League is the 24th season of Tajik League, the Tajikistan Football Federation's top division of association football. FC Istiklol are the defending champions, having won the previous season.

== Teams ==
Locations of teams in the 2015 Tajik League

Team	Location	Venue	Capacity
Barqi Tojik	Hisor	Central Republican Stadium	24,000
CSKA Pomir Dushanbe	Dushanbe	CSKA Stadium	7,000
Daleron-Uroteppa	Istaravshan	Istaravshan Arena	20,000
Istiklol	Dushanbe	Central Republican Stadium	24,000
Khayr Vahdat	Vahdat		
Khujand	Khujand	20-Letie Nezavisimosti Stadium	20,000
Parvoz Bobojon Ghafurov	Ghafurov	Furudgoh Stadium	5,000
Ravshan	Kulob	Kulob Central Stadium	20,000
Regar-TadAZ	Tursunzoda	Stadium Metallurg 1st District	20,000
Vakhsh	Qurghonteppa	Tsentralnyi Stadium	10,000

=== Managerial changes ===
Team	Outgoing manager	Manner of departure	Date of vacancy	Position in table	Incoming manager	Date of appointment
Ravshan	(Tajikistan) Makhmadjon Khabibulloev	Resigned	3 July 2015	5th		

== League table ==
Pos	Team	Pld	W	D	L	GF	GA	GD	Pts	Qualification or relegation
1	Istiklol (C, Q)	18	16	2	0	69	5	+64	50	2016 AFC Cup (Note: Istiklol won the 2015 Tajik Cup and therefore FK Khujand took the second 2016 AFC Cup spot)
2	FK Khujand (Q)	18	12	3	3	34	21	+13	39	2016 AFC Cup
3	Ravshan Kulob	18	10	4	4	37	26	+11	34	
4	Regar-TadAZ	18	9	6	3	31	14	+17	33	
5	Khayr Vahdat FK	18	8	5	5	21	26	−5	29	
6	CSKA Pomir Dushanbe	18	8	2	8	18	22	−4	26	
7	Barki Tajik	18	4	2	12	17	32	−15	14	
8	Vakhsh	18	3	4	11	11	34	−23	13	
9	FK Daleron-Uroteppa	18	3	3	12	16	36	−20	12	
10	Parvoz	18	1	1	16	6	44	−38	4	

Updated to match(es) played on 22 November 2015. Source: Fifa
Rules for classification: 1) points; 2) goal difference; 3) number of goals scored.
(C) Champions; (Q) Qualified for the phase indicated

=== Results ===
Home \ Away	BKT	CSKA	DAU	IST	KHJ	KVD	PBG	RAV	RAZ	VAK
Barki Tajik		0–1	3–1	0–5	1–3	2–4	1–0	2–2	1–3	2–0
CSKA	1–0		1–0	1–5	3–2	3–1	1–0	2–3	0–0	0–0
Daleron-Uroteppa	2–0	1–2		0–1	1–2	0–3	1–1	3–4	1–2	1–1
Istiklol	3–1	1–0	4–0		2–0	8–0	8–0	6–1	1–0	5–0
Khujand	1–0	1–0	1–1	1–7		3–0	1–0	2–1	2–1	4–0
Khayr Vahdat	3–0	2–0	2–0	0–1	1–1		1–0	0–0	0–0	2–0
Parvoz Bobojon Ghafurov	1–2	0–1	0–1	0–8	0–3	1–2		0–5	1–3	2–1
Ravshan	3–2	1–0	5–0	1–1	1–3	1–2	1–0		2–1	3–0
Regar-TadAZ	1–0	1–0	6–0	0–0	1–1	2–2	3–0	2–2		2–1
Vakhsh	0–0	4–2	1–0	0–3	1–3	1–1	1–0	0–1	0–3	

Updated to match(es) played on 22 November 2015. Source:
Legend: Blue = home team win; Yellow = draw; Red = away team win.

== Top scorers ==
As of Match played 22 November 2015

Rank	Player	Club	Goals
1	(Tajikistan) Manuchekhr Dzhalilov	Istiklol	22
2	(Iran) Hossein Sohrabi	Ravshan Kulob	18
3	(Tajikistan) Kamil Saidov	Regar-TaDAZ	9
3	(Tajikistan) Fatkhullo Fatkhuloev	Istiklol	9
5	(Tajikistan) Davronjon Tukhtasunov	CSKA	8
6	(Tajikistan) Komron Tursunov	Regar-TaDAZ	7
6	(Spain) Manuel Bleda	Istiklol	7
6	(Ghana) Andoh Napoleon	Khayr Vahdat / CSKA	7
9	(Tajikistan) Dilshod Vasiev	Istiklol	6
9	(Tajikistan) Farkhod Tokhirov	Khujand	6

=== Hat-tricks ===
Player	For	Against	Result	Date
(Tajikistan) Manuchekhr Dzhalilov^{4}	Istiklol	CSKA	5–1	4 May 2015
(Tajikistan) Manuchekhr Dzhalilov^{5}	Istiklol	Khayr	8–0	9 August 2015
(Iran) Hoseyni Sohrobi^{4}	Ravshan	Parvoz	5–0	12 September 2015
(Tajikistan) Manuchekhr Dzhalilov	Istiklol	Parvoz	8–0	26 October 2015
(Tajikistan) Manuchekhr Dzhalilov	Istiklol	Khujand	7–1	22 November 2015

- ^{4} Player scored 4 goals
- ^{5} Player scored 5 goals
