= Hasan Rustamov =

Tajikistani footballer

Personal information
- Full name: Hasan Rustamov
- Date of birth: 21 February 1988 (age 38)
- Place of birth: Tajikistan
- Height: 1.78 m (5 ft 10 in)
- Position: Defender

Team information
- Current team: Regar-TadAZ

Senior career*
Years	Team	Apps	(Gls)
2009–2012	Regar-TadAZ		
2013	Khujand		
2014	Energetik Dushanbe		
2015–2016	Khujand		
2016–2017	Khosilot Farkhor		
2017	Vakhsh Qurghonteppa		
2018–2019	Khujand		
2019–	Regar-TadAZ		

International career^{‡}
2007–	Tajikistan	6	(0)
- * Club domestic league appearances and goals as of 15 March 2017 ‡ National team caps and goals as of 12 November 2015

Hasan Rustamov (born 21 February 1988) is a Tajikistani footballer who last played for FK Khujand and the Tajikistan national football team.

== Career ==
On 20 January 2019, FK Khujand announced Rustamov had left the club after his contract had expired.

== Career statistics ==
=== International ===
Tajikistan national team
Year	Apps	Goals
2007	1	0
2008	0	0
2009	0	0
2010	1	0
2011	0	0
2012	0	0
2013	0	0
2014	2	0
2015	2	0
Total	6	0

Statistics accurate as of match played 12 November 2015

== Honors ==
Regar-TadAZ

- Tajik Cup (2): 2011, 2012
