= Tsentralnyi Stadium (Bokhtar) =

Multi-use stadium in Bokhtar, Tajikistan

Coordinates: 37°49′52″N 68°46′38″E

Bokhtar Markazii Stadium or Bokhtar Central Stadium is a multi-use stadium in Bokhtar, Tajikistan. It is used mostly for football matches and serves as the home of Vakhsh Bokhtar and Tajik Telecom Qurghonteppa, both of the Ligai Olii Tojikiston. The stadium has a capacity of 10,000 people.
