= TALCO Arena =

Tajik Stadium

Coordinates: 38.51761°N 68.21620°E

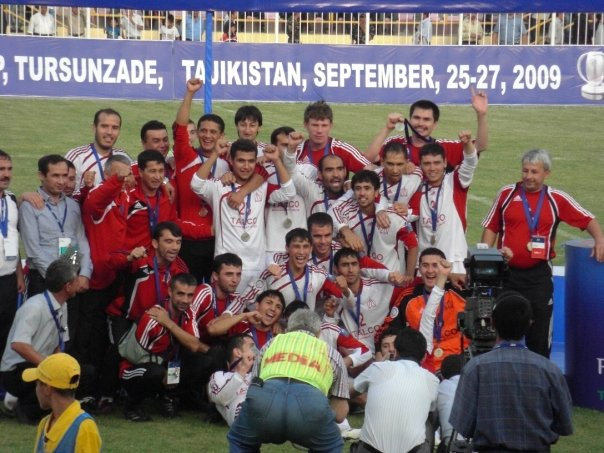
- TALCO Arena
- Interactive map of TALCO Arena
- Location: Tursunzade, Tajikistan
- Owner: Regar-TadAZ
- Operator: Regar-TadAZ
- Capacity: 13,770
- Surface: Grass
- Field size: 111 yards (101 m) by 74 yards (68 m)

Construction
- Built: 1960
- Opened: 1960
- Renovated: 1998, 2003, 2008, 2016—2017

Tenants
- Regar-TadAZ Tursunzoda; FC Sardor

TALCO Arena (Tajik: ТАЛКО Арена) is a multi-use stadium in Tursunzoda, Tajikistan. It is currently used mostly for football matches and serves as the home of Regar-TadAZ Tursunzoda of the Tajik League. The stadium has a capacity of 13 770 people. Until 2017 it was called the stadium "Metallurg".

"Metallurg" stadium was built and opened in 1960. In 1998, on the site of the old stadium builders of the Tajik Aluminum Company (TALCO), the current stadium was built. At that time, the stadium had a single, west stand, which seats 3050 spectators. In 2003, the first reconstruction took place at the stadium, in the course of which the second was built - the eastern grandstand, and the capacity of the stadium was increased to 6000. In 2008, a second reconstruction, during which the stadium there were two side stands, as well as the overlap of the stands on the similarity of the roof . After this renovation, the stadium capacity was 13,770. In 2016-2017 was carried out reconstruction of the third in a row, during which the stadium has been completely updated, and the capacity has remained the same - 13 770. During the reconstruction of a complete replacement of the seats were held, sun deck slab stands and new race tracks, equipped with the latest sound equipment, scoreboard. Also, the stadium was equipped with surveillance cameras. During the reconstruction of the stadium, it was decided to rename the "TALCO Arena". The opening of the stadium took place in March 2017. In 2009, at the stadium "Metallurg" held the final stage of the AFC President's Cup 2009. The stadium except for sports tournaments and matches are held parties and events of the city and state scale.
