= Tajikistan national football team results =

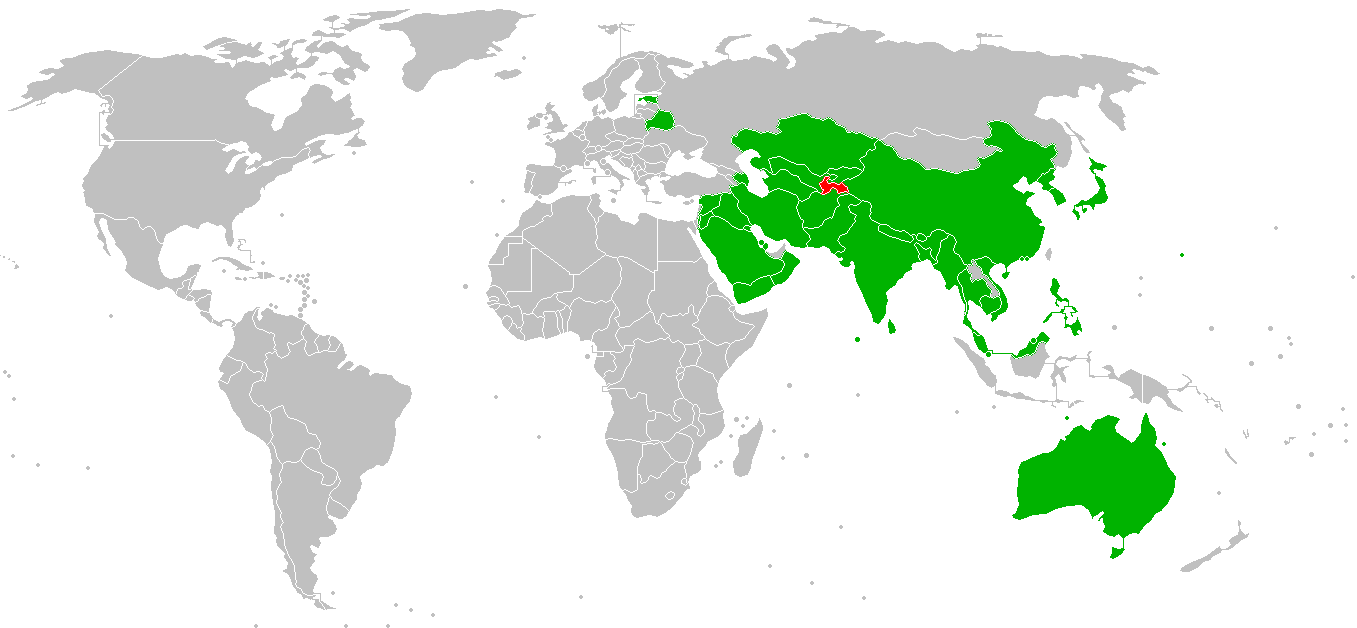
Tajikistan national football team all opponents

This article shows the Tajikistan national football team's results in International Matches, as recognized by FIFA:

== Overview of results ==
As of match played 14 November 2026

Type	Record						
Type	G	W	D	L	GF	GA	Win %
Friendly Matches	73	24	15	34	86	112	32.88
FIFA World Cup qualification	50	19	10	21	88	74	38
AFC Asian Cup Qualification	28	15	6	7	48	27	57.14
AFC Challenge Cup Qualification	9	6	2	1	15	2	66.67
AFC Asian Cup	5	1	2	2	3	4	20
AFC Challenge Cup	19	11	2	6	36	16	57.89
Other Tournaments	19	5	6	8	21	30	26.32
Total	204	81	43	80	297	266	39.71

== International Matches ==
=== 1992–1999 ===
Type	GP	W	D	L	GF	GA
Friendly Matches	5	1	1	3	3	8
1996 AFC ACQ	2	1	0	1	4	5
1998 WCQ	6	4	1	1	15	2
1998 Asian Games	5	1	1	3	8	13
2000 AFC ACQ	3	2	0	1	6	5
Total	21	9	3	9	36	33

==== 1994 ====
11 April 1994 Friendly	Tajikistan	0 – 1	Kazakhstan	Tashkent, Uzbekistan
TJT (UTC+5)		Summary; Report	Kapustnikov 47'	Stadium: MHSK Stadium; Attendance: 9,000; Referee: Sardar Nadzhafaliev (Uzbekistan)

15 April 1994 Friendly	Tajikistan	1 – 0	Kyrgyzstan	Tashkent, Uzbekistan
TJT (UTC+5)	Erofeev 67'	Report	Urme (red card) 62'	Stadium: MHSK Stadium; Attendance: 3,000; Referee: Eldar Ramazanov (Turkmenistan)

17 April 1994 Friendly	Uzbekistan	1 – 1	Tajikistan	Tashkent, Uzbekistan
TJT (UTC+5)	Cherevchenko 36' (o.g.)	Report	Shashkov 25'	Stadium: MHSK Stadium; Referee: Kadyrbek Chinnibekov (Kyrgyzstan)

19 April 1994 Friendly	Turkmenistan	2 – 0	Tajikistan	Tashkent, Uzbekistan
TJT (UTC+5)	Mingazow 21'; Mukhadov 90'	Report		Stadium: Central Stadium Pakhtakor; Attendance: 2,000; Referee: Kurmanbek Ordabaev (Kazakhstan)

==== 1996 ====
8 May 1996 1996 AFC ACQ	Tajikistan	4 – 0	Uzbekistan	Dushanbe, Tajikistan
17:30 TJT (UTC+5)	Fuzailov 3' (pen.); Ashurmamadov 65', 67'; Avakov 87'	Report		Stadium: Pamir Stadium, Attendance: 20,000; Referee: Aleksandr Klakov (Kazakhstan)

19 June 1996 1996 AFC ACQ	Uzbekistan	5 – 0 (a.e.t.) (5 – 4 agg.)	Tajikistan	Tashkent, Uzbekistan
TJT (UTC+5)	Kasymov 4' (pen.), 33' (pen.); Andreev 8'; Shkvyrin 72'; Musabaev 95'	Report		Stadium: Pakhtakor Stadium, Attendance: 15,000; Referee: Eldar Ramazanov (Turkmenistan)

==== 1997 ====
4 May 1997 1998 WCQ	Tajikistan	4 – 0	Vietnam	Dushanbe, Tajikistan
TJT (UTC+5)	Alidodov 8'; Muminov 15'; Dzhaborov 50', 84'	report		Stadium: Pamir Stadium; Attendance: 18,000; Referee: Alexander Koulzalov (Kazakhstan)

11 May 1997 1998 WCQ	Tajikistan	0 – 1	China	Dushanbe, Tajikistan
TJT (UTC+5)		report	Hao Haidong 65'	Stadium: Pamir Stadium; Attendance: 19,000; Referee: Masoud Kaabi (Iran)

25 May 1997 1998 WCQ	Turkmenistan	1 – 2	Tajikistan	Ashgabat, Turkmenistan
TJT (UTC+5)	Tkavadze 18'	report	Knyazev 41', 49'	Stadium: Nisa-Çandybil Stadium; Attendance: 3,000; Referee: Inayath Ulla Khan (India)

1 June 1997 1998 WCQ	Vietnam	0 – 4	Tajikistan	Ho Chi Minh City, Vietnam
TJT (UTC+5)		report	Muminov 5'; Alidodov 24'; Avakov 67'; Ashurmamadov 75'	Stadium: Thong Nhat Stadium; Attendance: 10,000; Referee: Ngadiman Asri (Indonesia)

8 June 1997 1998 WCQ	China	0 – 0	Tajikistan	Beijing, China
TJT (UTC+5)		report		Stadium: Workers Stadium; Attendance: 21,000; Referee: Abdul Khudheir Abdul Hussein (Iraq)

22 June 1997 1998 WCQ	Tajikistan	5 – 0	Turkmenistan	Dushanbe, Tajikistan
TJT (UTC+5)	Avakov 4', 26', 34'; Dzhaborov 14'; Muminov 88'	report		Stadium: Pamir Stadium; Attendance: 7,000; Referee: Nail Lutfullin (Uzbekistan)

24 August 1997 Friendly	South Korea	4 – 1	Tajikistan	Daegu, South Korea
TJT (UTC+5)	Kim Do-Hoon; Choi Yong-Soo; Yoo Sang-Chul		Tukhtaev 33'

==== 1998 ====
1 December 1998 1998 Asian Games	Tajikistan	3 – 0	Maldives	Bangkok, Thailand
TJT (UTC+5)	Muminov 21'; Berdikulov 65'; Saltsman 75'

3 December 1998 1998 Asian Games	Qatar	2 – 1	Tajikistan	Bangkok, Thailand
TJT (UTC+5)	Goal		Dzhaborov 90' (pen.)

8 December 1998 1998 Asian Games	China	3 – 1	Tajikistan	Bangkok, Thailand
TJT (UTC+5)	Junzhe 7'; Jinyu 56'; Muminov 71' (o.g.)	Report	Zabirov 55'	Stadium: National Stadium

10 December 1998 1998 Asian Games	Iran	5 – 0	Tajikistan	Bangkok, Thailand
TJT (UTC+5)	Goal

12 December 1998 1998 Asian Games	Tajikistan	3 – 3	Oman	Bangkok, Thailand
TJT (UTC+5)	Dzhaborov 11'; Muminov 25', 68'		Goal

==== 1999 ====
3 August 1999 2000 AFC ACQ	Tajikistan	1 – 2	Iraq	Dushanbe, Tajikistan
KGT (UTC+6)	Muminov 32' (pen.)		Essam Hamad 28' (pen.); Habib Jafar 90'	Stadium: Central Stadium

5 August 1999 2000 AFC ACQ	Kyrgyzstan	2 – 3	Tajikistan	Dushanbe, Tajikistan
KGT (UTC+6)	Zhumagulov 45'; Berdaly 75'		Muminov 6', 11' (pen.); Nazarov 57'	Stadium: Central Stadium; Attendance: 6,000; Referee: Saeed Abdullah Ibrahim (U.A.E)

7 August 1999 2000 AFC ACQ	Tajikistan	2 – 1	Oman	Dushanbe, Tajikistan
KGT (UTC+6)	Knyazev 21'; Kulbayev 29'		Jamal Al-Balushi 43'	Stadium: Central Stadium

=== 2000-2009 ===
Type	GP	W	D	L	GF	GA
Friendly Matches	10	1	1	8	11	27
2002 FIFA World Cup qualification	2	1	0	1	16	2
2004 AFC Asian Cup qualification	6	2	2	2	3	5
2006 FIFA World Cup qualification	8	4	1	3	9	9
2006 AFC Challenge Cup	6	5	0	1	18	2
2010 FIFA World Cup qualification	4	1	2	1	7	4
2008 AFC Challenge Cup qualification	3	2	1	0	7	1
2008 AFC Challenge Cup	5	2	2	1	7	5
Total	44	18	9	17	78	55

==== 2000 ====
26 November 2000 2002 WCQ	Tajikistan	16 – 0	Guam	Tabriz, Iran
15:00 TJT (UTC+5)	Ashurmamadov 3', 16'; Muminov 13'; Knitel 20'; Khojayev 26', 39', 70'; Khamidov 31', 47', 77', 89' (pen.); Fuzailov 52'; Berdikulov 62', 67'; Dzhaborov 77'; Usmonov 87'	Report		Stadium: Takhti Stadium; Attendance: 5,000; Referee: Hani Ballan (QAT)

28 November 2000 2002 WCQ	Iran	2 – 0	Tajikistan	Tabriz, Iran
15:00 TJT (UTC+5)	Daei 47'; Hasheminasab 54'	Report		Stadium: Takhti Stadium; Attendance: 35,000; Referee: Mahmoud Al-Rifaee (SYR)

==== 2003 ====
6 November 2003 2004 AFC ACQ	Tajikistan	1 – 0	Thailand	Tashkent, Uzbekistan
TJT (UTC+5)	Fuzailov 79'

8 November 2003 2004 AFC ACQ	Tajikistan	0 – 0	Hong Kong	Tashkent, Uzbekistan
TJT (UTC+5)

10 November 2003 2004 AFC ACQ	Uzbekistan	0 – 0	Tajikistan	Tashkent, Uzbekistan
TJT (UTC+5)

17 November 2003 2004 AFC ACQ	Uzbekistan	4 – 1	Tajikistan	Bangkok, Thailand
TJT (UTC+5)	Shishelov 8', 36'; Kapadze 50'; Koshelev 61'		Burkhanov 65'	Stadium: Rajamangala Stadium

19 November 2003 2004 AFC ACQ	Tajikistan	0 – 1	Thailand	Bangkok, Thailand
TJT (UTC+5)			Chaiman 83'

21 November 2003 2004 AFC ACQ	Hong Kong	0 – 1	Tajikistan	Bangkok, Thailand
TJT (UTC+5)			Mukhidinov 68'

26 November 2003 2006 WCQ	Bangladesh	0 – 2	Tajikistan	Dhaka, Bangladesh
15:00 TJT (UTC+5)		(Report)	Khamidov 11'; N.Hakimov 51'	Stadium: Sher-e-Bangla Cricket Stadium; Attendance: 6,000; Referee: Virat Khanthachai (Thailand)

30 November 2003 2006 WCQ	Tajikistan	2 – 0 (4 – 0 agg.)	Bangladesh	Dushanbe, Tajikistan
14:00 TJT (UTC+5)	Kholmatov 15'; Rabiev 83'	(Report)		Stadium: Pamir Stadium; Attendance: 12,000; Referee: Manuel Pereira (India)

==== 2004 ====
18 February 2004 2006 WCQ	Kyrgyzstan	1 – 2	Tajikistan	Bishkek, Kyrgyzstan
14:00 TJT (UTC+5)	Berezovsky 12'	(Report)	Burkhanov 31', 53'	Stadium: Spartak Stadium; Attendance: 14,000; Referee: Nail Lutfullin (Uzbekistan)

31 March 2004 2006 WCQ	Tajikistan	0 – 0	Bahrain	Dushanbe, Tajikistan
16:00 TJT (UTC+5)		(Report)		Stadium: Pamir Stadium; Attendance: 17,000; Referee: Shamsul Maidin (Singapore)

10 June 2004 2006 WCQ	Syria	2 – 1	Tajikistan	Homs, Syria
19:15 TJT (UTC+5)	Al Rashed 76'; Rafe 80'	(Report)	Kholmatov 35'	Stadium: Khaled bin Walid Stadium; Attendance: 18,000; Referee: Saad Kamil Al-Fadhli (Kuwait)

8 September 2004 2006 WCQ	Tajikistan	0 – 1	Syria	Dushanbe, Tajikistan
16:00 TJT (UTC+5)		(Report)	Rafe 35'	Stadium: Pamir Stadium; Attendance: 18,000; Referee: Subkhiddin Mohd Salleh (Malaysia)

13 October 2004 2006 WCQ	Tajikistan	2 – 1	Kyrgyzstan	Dushanbe, Tajikistan
14:00 TJT (UTC+5)	Rabiev 19'; M.Hakimov 37'	(Report)	Chikishev 84'	Stadium: Pamir Stadium; Attendance: 11,000; Referee: Naser Al Enezi (Kuwait)

17 November 2004 2006 WCQ	Bahrain	4 – 0	Tajikistan	Ar Rifa`, Bahrain
16:00 TJT (UTC+5)	Yousef 9'; Husain 41'; M. Hubail 42', 77'	(Report)		Stadium: Bahrain National Stadium; Attendance: 15,000; Referee: Sun Baojie (China PR)

6 December 2004 Friendly	Kuwait	3 – 0	Tajikistan	Kuwait City, Kuwait
TJT (UTC+5)	Goal

==== 2005 ====
25 January 2005 Friendly	Saudi Arabia	3 – 0	Tajikistan	Riyadh, Saudi Arabia
TJT (UTC+5)	Goal

9 November 2005 Friendly	Tajikistan	4 – 0	Afghanistan	Dushanbe, Tajikistan
TJT (UTC+5)	N.Hakimov 28', 31'; Makhmudov 45+1'; Ashurmamadov 67'			Stadium: Pamir Stadium

==== 2006 ====
14 February 2006 Friendly	Qatar	2 – 0	Tajikistan	Doha, Qatar
TJT (UTC+5)	Goal

2 April 2006 2006 AFC CC	Tajikistan	4 – 0	Macau	Dhaka, Bangladesh
14:30 TJT (UTC+5)	Mahmudov 9'; Rabiev 13'; Rabimov 56'; Khojayev 77'	Report		Stadium: Bangabandhu Stadium; Attendance: 2,000; Referee: Hedayat Mombini (Iran)

4 April 2006 2006 AFC CC	Pakistan	0 – 2	Tajikistan	Dhaka, Bangladesh
14:30 TJT (UTC+5)		Report	N.Hakimov 14'; Irgashev 20'	Stadium: Bangabandhu Stadium; Attendance: 5,000; Referee: Tan Hai (China PR)

6 April 2006 2006 AFC CC	Tajikistan	0 – 1	Kyrgyzstan	Dhaka, Bangladesh
14:00 UTC+6		Report	Krasnov 22'	Stadium: Bangabandhu Stadium; Attendance: 2,000; Referee: Ala Abdul (Iraq)

10 April 2006 2006 AFC CC	Tajikistan	6 – 1	Bangladesh	Dhaka, Bangladesh
14:30 TJT (UTC+5)	Rabimov 2'; Mahmudov 20'; Mukhidinov 31'; N.Hakimov 51'; Rabiev 65'; Nematov 81'	Report	Alfaz 17'	Stadium: Bangabandhu Stadium; Attendance: 15,000; Referee: Ala Abdul (Iraq)

13 April 2006 2006 AFC CC	Kyrgyzstan	0 – 2	Tajikistan	Dhaka, Bangladesh
14:30 TJT (UTC+5)		Report	Rabiev 51', 90+2'	Stadium: Bangabandhu Stadium; Attendance: 2,000; Referee: Tan Hai (China PR)

16 April 2006 2006 AFC CC	Sri Lanka	0 – 4	Tajikistan	Dhaka, Bangladesh
14:30 TJT (UTC+5)		Report	Mukhidinov 1', 61', 71' (Note: Although the match summary indicates that Mukhidinov scored three goals, a match review article published by the AFC on 19 April 2006 indicates that he only scored two goals while teammate Numonjon Hakimov scored one goal.); Mahmudov 45'	Stadium: Bangabandhu Stadium; Attendance: 2,000; Referee: Hedayat Mombini (Iran)

2 July 2006 Friendly	Kazakhstan	4 – 1	Tajikistan	Almaty, Kazakhstan
TJT (UTC+5)	Zhumaskaliyev 22'; Familtsev 40'; Kuchma 63'; Tleshev 90'	Summary	Saidov 75'	Stadium: Almaty Central Stadium

==== 2007 ====
22 August 2007 Friendly	Tajikistan	2 – 3	Azerbaijan	Dushanbe, Tajikistan
TJT (UTC+5)	Barotov 18'; Saidov 31'	(Report)	Aliyev 25', 29'; Subašić 43'	Stadium: Pamir Stadium; Referee: Orif Djuraev (Tajikistan)

8 September 2007 Friendly	Kazakhstan	1 – 1	Tajikistan	Almaty, Kazakhstan
TJT (UTC+5)	Nurdauletov 54'	Summary	Saidov 42'	Stadium: Almaty Central Stadium; Attendance: 10,000; Referee: Emil Busurmankulov (Kyrgyzstan)

8 October 2007 2010 WCQ	Bangladesh	1 – 1	Tajikistan	Dhaka, Bangladesh
14:00 TJT (UTC+5)	Mithu 50'	Report	N.Hakimov 58' (pen.)	Stadium: Bangabandhu National Stadium; Attendance: 700; Referee: Abdullah Al Hilali (Oman)

28 October 2007 2010 WCQ	Tajikistan	5 – 0	Bangladesh	Dushanbe, Tajikistan
14:00 TJT (UTC+5)	N.Hakimov 47', 48', 76' (pen.); Mukhiddinov 51'; Vasiev 71'	Report		Stadium: Central Stadium; Attendance: 10,000; Referee: Kadyrbek Chynybekov (Kyrgyzstan)

9 November 2007 2010 WCQ	Singapore	2 – 0	Tajikistan	Singapore
16:30 TJT (UTC+5)	Duric 23', 44'	Report		Stadium: National Stadium; Attendance: 6,606; Referee: Kwon Jong Chul (South Korea)

18 November 2007 2010 WCQ	Tajikistan	1 – 1	Singapore	Dushanbe, Tajikistan
13:00 TJT (UTC+5)	Ismailov 2'	Report	Shah 25'	Stadium: Central Stadium; Attendance: 21,500; Referee: Mark Shield (Australia)

16 December 2007 Friendly	Oman	4 – 2	Tajikistan	Muscat, Oman
TJT (UTC+5)	Goal	Report	Saidov 26'; Tukhtasunov 47'

==== 2008 ====
13 May 2008 2008 AFC CCQ	Tajikistan	3 – 1	Bhutan	Iloilo City, Philippines
12:30 TJT (UTC+5)	N.Hakimov 27', 88' (pen.); Rabiev 60'	Report	P. Tshering 69'	Stadium: Barotac Nuevo Plaza Field; Attendance: 5,000; Referee: Ng Chiu Kok (Hong Kong)

15 May 2008 2008 AFC CCQ	Philippines	0 – 0	Tajikistan	Iloilo City, Philippines
12:30 TJT (UTC+5)		Report		Stadium: Iloilo Sports Complex; Attendance: 4,500; Referee: Ali Al-Badawi (United Arab Emirates)

17 May 2008 2008 AFC CCQ	Tajikistan	4 – 0	Brunei	Iloilo City, Philippines
12:30 TJT (UTC+5)	Rabiev 46', 87'; Mukhidinov 61'; N.Hakimov 69'	Report		Stadium: Iloilo Sports Complex; Attendance: 450; Referee: Ali Al-Badawi (United Arab Emirates)

30 July 2008 2008 AFC CC	Turkmenistan	0 – 0	Tajikistan	Hyderabad, India
15:30 TJT (UTC+5)		Report		Stadium: Gachibowli Athletic Stadium; Attendance: 150; Referee: Valentin Kovalenko (Uzbekistan)

1 August 2008 2008 AFC CC	Tajikistan	1 – 1	India	Hyderabad, India
15:30 TJT (UTC+5)	Rabiev 11'	Report	Tuychiev 61' (o.g.)	Stadium: Gachibowli Athletic Stadium; Attendance: 350; Referee: Tayeb Shamsuzzaman (Bangladesh)

3 August 2008 2008 AFC CC	Afghanistan	0 – 4	Tajikistan	Hyderabad, India
15:00 TJT (UTC+5)		Report	Rabiev 14', 44', 56'; Tukhtasunov 39'	Stadium: Lal Bahadur Shastri Stadium; Attendance: 150; Referee: Vo Minh Tri (Vietnam)

7 August 2008 2008 AFC CC	North Korea	0 – 1	Tajikistan	Hyderabad, India
19:00 TJT (UTC+5)		Report	Mukhidinov 39'	Stadium: Gachibowli Athletic Stadium; Attendance: 600; Referee: Masaaki Toma (Japan)

13 August 2008 2008 AFC CC	India	4 – 1	Tajikistan	New Delhi, India
18:30 TJT (UTC+5)	Chhetri 9', 23', 75'; Bhutia 18'	Report	Fatkhuloev 44'	Stadium: Ambedkar Stadium; Attendance: 10,000; Referee: Valentin Kovalenko (Uzbekistan)

20 August 2008 Friendly	Qatar	5 – 0	Tajikistan	Doha, Qatar
TJT (UTC+5)	Goal

==== 2009 ====
30 December 2009 Friendly	Yemen	2 – 1	Tajikistan	Sana'a, Yemen
TJT (UTC+5)	Goal		Rabimov 35'

=== 2010–2019 ===
Type	GP	W	D	L	GF	GA
Friendly Matches	35	14	7	14	45	49
2010 AFC Challenge Cup	5	3	0	2	8	5
2012 AFC Challenge Cup qualification	3	2	1	0	4	0
2014 FIFA World Cup qualification	8	2	1	5	7	18
2012 AFC Challenge Cup	3	1	0	2	3	4
2014 AFC Challenge Cup qualification	3	2	0	1	4	1
2018 FIFA World Cup qualification	8	1	2	5	9	20
2019 AFC Asian Cup qualification	8	4	1	3	16	9
2022 FIFA World Cup qualification	5	2	1	2	6	8
Total	78	31	14	33	102	114

==== 2010 ====
2 January 2010 Friendly	Yemen	0 – 1	Tajikistan	Sana'a, Yemen
TJT (UTC+5)			Tukhtasunov 80'

16 February 2010 2010 AFC CC	Tajikistan	1 – 2	Bangladesh	Colombo, Sri Lanka
15:30 TJT (UTC+5)	Rabiev 70'	Report	E. Hoque 67'; Meshu 74'	Stadium: Sugathadasa Stadium; Attendance: 1,000; Referee: Hajime Matsuo (Japan)

18 February 2010 2010 AFC CC	Sri Lanka	1 – 3	Tajikistan	Colombo, Sri Lanka
15:30 TJT (UTC+5)	Dalpethado 78'	Report	Rabimov 13'; Fatkhuloev 32', 90+2'	Stadium: Sugathadasa Stadium; Attendance: 1,000; Referee: Tan Hai (China PR)

20 February 2010 2010 AFC CC	Tajikistan	3 – 0	Myanmar	Colombo, Sri Lanka
14:30 TJT (UTC+5)	Rabimov 33'; N.Hakimov 52'; Rabiev 88'	Report		Stadium: CR & FC Grounds; Attendance: 100; Referee: Nawaf Abdulla (Bahrain)

24 February 2010 2010 AFC CC	Tajikistan	0 – 2	Turkmenistan	Colombo, Sri Lanka
15:00 TJT (UTC+5)		Report	Amanow 33'; Urazow 42'	Stadium: Sugathadasa Stadium; Attendance: 300; Referee: Alireza Faghani (Iran)

27 February 2010 2010 AFC CC	Tajikistan	1 – 0	Myanmar	Colombo, Sri Lanka
15:00 TJT (UTC+5)	N.Hakimov 11'	Report		Stadium: Sugathadasa Stadium; Attendance: 300; Referee: Andre El Haddad (Lebanon)

26 June 2010 Friendly	China	4 – 0	Tajikistan	Kunming, China
TJT (UTC+5)				Stadium: Kunming Tuodong Sports Center

17 November 2010 Friendly	Tajikistan	1 – 0	Afghanistan	Dushanbe, Tajikistan
TJT (UTC+5)	Choriyev 33'			Stadium: Pamir Stadium

==== 2011 ====
21 March 2011 2012 AFC CCQ	Tajikistan	1 – 0	Kyrgyzstan	Malé, Maldives
16:00 TJT (UTC+5)	R. Sydykov 88' (o.g.)	Report		Stadium: National Stadium; Attendance: 4,000; Referee: Mohammed Mohamed (UAE)

23 March 2011 2012 AFC CCQ	Cambodia	0 – 3	Tajikistan	Malé, Maldives
21:00 TJT (UTC+5)		Report	Davronov 2'; D.Ergashev 83'; Rabimov 89'	Stadium: National Stadium; Attendance: 550; Referee: Pratap Singh (India)

25 March 2011 2012 AFC CCQ	Tajikistan	0 – 0	Maldives	Malé, Maldives
21:00 TJT (UTC+5)		Report		Stadium: National Stadium; Attendance: 9,000; Referee: Mohammed Mohamed (UAE)

27 March 2011 Friendly	Sri Lanka	2 – 2	Tajikistan	Colombo, Sri Lanka
TJT (UTC+5)	Goal		Rabimov 56'; Vasiev 73'	Stadium: Sugathadasa Stadium

29 March 2011 Friendly	Sri Lanka	0 – 2	Tajikistan	Colombo, Sri Lanka
TJT (UTC+5)			D.Ergashev 56'; Vasiev	Stadium: Sugathadasa Stadium

23 July 2011 2014 WCQ	Syria	0 – 3 Awarded (Note: FIFA awarded Tajikistan a 3–0 win as a result of Syria fielding the ineligible player George Mourad. The match originally ended 2–1 to Syria.)	Tajikistan	Amman Jordan (Note: Syria hosted its home leg in Jordan due to civil unrest.)
21:00 TJT (UTC+5)	Mourad 45+1'; Rafe 77'	Report	Saidov 47'	Stadium: King Abdullah Stadium; Attendance: 2,500; Referee: Nasser Darwish (Jordan)

28 July 2011 2014 WCQ	Tajikistan	3 – 0 Awarded (Note: FIFA awarded Tajikistan a 3–0 win as a result of Syria fielding the ineligible player George Mourad. The match originally ended 4–0 to Syria.) (6 – 0 agg.)	Syria	Tursunzoda, Tajikistan
16:00 TJT (UTC+5)		Report	Rafe 6', 35'; Sabagh 53'; Choriev 86' (o.g.)	Stadium: Metallurg Stadium; Attendance: 9,000; Referee: Dmitriy Mashentsev (Kyrgyzstan)

2 September 2011 2014 WCQ	Tajikistan	0 – 1	Uzbekistan	Tursunzoda, Tajikistan
16:30 TJT (UTC+5)		Report	Shatskikh 72'	Stadium: Metallurg Stadium; Attendance: 15,000; Referee: Tan Hai (China PR)

6 September 2011 2014 WCQ	North Korea	1 – 0	Tajikistan	Pyongyang, North Korea
12:30 TJT (UTC+5)	Pak Nam-Chol 14'	Report		Stadium: Yanggakdo Stadium; Attendance: 28,000; Referee: Vo Minh Tri (Vietnam)

11 October 2011 2014 WCQ	Japan	8 – 0	Tajikistan	Osaka, Japan
15:45 TJT (UTC+5)	Havenaar 11', 47'; Okazaki 19', 74'; Komano 35'; Kagawa 41', 68'; Nakamura 56'	Report		Stadium: Nagai Stadium; Attendance: 44,688; Referee: Benjamin Williams (Australia)

11 November 2011 2014 WCQ	Tajikistan	0 – 4	Japan	Dushanbe, Tajikistan
14:00 TJT (UTC+5)		Report	Konno 36'; Okazaki 61', 90+2'; Maeda 82'	Stadium: Central Stadium; Attendance: 18,000; Referee: Kim Dong Jin (Korea Republic)

15 November 2011 2014 WCQ	Uzbekistan	3 – 0	Tajikistan	Tashkent, Uzbekistan
18:00 TJT (UTC+5)	Tursunov 35'; Ahmedov 60'; Geynrikh 70'	Report		Stadium: Pakhtakor Markaziy Stadium; Attendance: 5,325; Referee: Mohamed Al Zarouni (United Arab Emirates)

==== 2012 ====
29 February 2012 2014 WCQ	Tajikistan	1 – 1	North Korea	Khujand, Tajikistan
13:30 TJT (UTC+5)	Khamroqulov 61'	Report	Jang Song-Hyok 54' (pen.)	Stadium: 20 Years of Independence Stadium; Attendance: 35,000; Referee: Banjar Al-Dosari (Qatar)

9 March 2012 2012 AFC CC	India	0 – 2	Tajikistan	Kathmandu, Nepal
16:15 TJT (UTC+5)		Report	Khamroqulov 61'; Davronov 66'	Stadium: Dasarath Rangasala Stadium; Attendance: 700; Referee: Ali Sabbagh (Lebanon)

11 March 2012 2012 AFC CC	Tajikistan	0 – 2	North Korea	Kathmandu, Nepal
14:15 TJT (UTC+5)		Report	Pak Nam-Chol I 4'; Jang Kuk-Chol 86'	Stadium: Halchowk Stadium; Attendance: 1,000; Referee: Yousef Al-Marzouq (Kuwait)

13 March 2012 2012 AFC CC	Tajikistan	1 – 2	Philippines	Kathmandu, Nepal
14:15 TJT (UTC+5)	Negmatov 45+1'	Report	P. Younghusband 54'; Á. Guirado 80'	Stadium: Halchowk Stadium; Attendance: 800; Referee: Ryuji Sato (Japan)

6 September 2012 Friendly	Qatar	1 – 2	Tajikistan	Ingolstadt, Germany
TJT (UTC+5)	Soria 75'	Report	D.Ergashev 65'; Vasiev 74'	Stadium: Audi Sportpark

6 November 2012 Friendly	Iran	6 – 1	Tajikistan	Tehran, Iran
TJT (UTC+5)	Dehnavi 9', 32'; Karimi 13', 33'; Hassanzadeh 50'; Abbasfard 89'	Report	Suvonkulov 68'	Stadium: Azadi Stadium

==== 2013 ====
17 March 2013 2014 AFC CCQ	Tajikistan	1 – 0	Pakistan	Bishkek, Kyrgyzstan
11:00 TJT (UTC+5)	Makhmudov 89'	Report		Stadium: Spartak Stadium; Attendance: 400; Referee: Masoud Tufayelieh (Syria)

19 March 2013 2014 AFC CCQ	Macau	0 – 3	Tajikistan	Bishkek, Kyrgyzstan
11:00 TJT (UTC+5)		Report	Ismailov 56', 90+2'; J.Ergashev 82'	Stadium: Spartak Stadium; Attendance: 800; Referee: Jameel Abdulhusin (Bahrain)

21 March 2013 2014 AFC CCQ	Kyrgyzstan	1 – 0	Tajikistan	Bishkek, Kyrgyzstan
15:00 TJT (UTC+5)	Tetteh 41'	Report		Stadium: Spartak Stadium; Attendance: 15,500; Referee: Masoud Tufayelieh (Syria)

14 August 2013 Friendly	Tajikistan	3 – 0	India	Khujand, Tajikistan
15:00 TJT (UTC+5)	Davronov 11'; Fatkhuloev 19'; Khamroqulov 90+3'	Report		Stadium: 20 Years of Independence Stadium; Referee: K. Dadoboev

==== 2014 ====
4 May 2014 Friendly	Tajikistan	1 – 0	Afghanistan	Dushanbe, Tajikistan
18:00 TJT (UTC+5)	Davronov 2'	Report		Stadium: Pamir Stadium

7 June 2014 Friendly	Estonia	2 – 1	Tajikistan	Tallinn, Estonia
TJT (UTC+5)	Luts 89'; Anier 90+2'	Report	Vasiev 61'	Stadium: A. Le Coq Arena

8 August 2014 Friendly	Tajikistan	4 – 1	Malaysia	Dushanbe, Tajikistan
18:00 TJT (UTC+5)	D.Ergashev 16'; Vasiyev 38', 53'; Davronov 54'	Report	Yahyah 43' (pen.)	Stadium: Pamir Stadium

12 August 2014 Friendly	Kazakhstan	2 – 1	Tajikistan	Almaty, Kazakhstan
18:30 TJT (UTC+5)	Dzholchiev 37'; Konysbayev 63'	Report	Tokhirov 57'	Stadium: Central Stadium

4 September 2014 Friendly	Belarus	6 – 1	Tajikistan	Barysaw, Belarus
21:00 TJT (UTC+5)	Stasevich 7' (pen.); Kornilenko 55'; Krivets 59'; Alyakhnovich 61'; Kislyak 63'; Aleksiyevich 75'	Report	Fatkhuloev 34'	Stadium: Borisov Arena; Referee: Sergejus Slyva (Lithuania)

==== 2015 ====
26 March 2015 Friendly	Maldives	0 – 2	Tajikistan	Malé, Maldives
21:00 TJT (UTC+5)		Report	Fatkhuloev 20'; Dzhalilov 63'	Stadium: Male' Sports Complex

31 March 2015 Friendly	Tajikistan	2 – 3	Syria	Dushanbe, Tajikistan
TJT (UTC+5)	Davronov 41'; Khamrakulov 88'	Report	Rafe 23', 38' (pen.); Al Hussain 61'	Stadium: Pamir Stadium; Attendance: 16,000; Referee: Vitali Meshkov (Russia)

11 June 2015 2018 WCQ	Tajikistan	1 – 3	Jordan	Dushanbe, Tajikistan
20:00 TJT (UTC+5)	Dzhalilov 67'	Report (FIFA); Report (AFC)	Abdel-Fattah 29', 64', 88'	Stadium: Pamir Stadium; Attendance: 19,000; Referee: Mohsen Torky (Iran)

16 June 2015 2018 WCQ	Bangladesh	1 – 1	Tajikistan	Dhaka, Bangladesh
16:00 TJT (UTC+5)	Hasan 50'	Report (FIFA); Report (AFC)	Fatkhuloev 87'	Stadium: Bangabandhu National Stadium; Attendance: 12,000; Referee: Lee Min-hu (South Korea)

8 September 2015 2018 WCQ	Tajikistan	0 – 3	Australia	Dushanbe, Tajikistan
18:00 TJT (UTC+5)		Report (FIFA); Report (AFC)	Milligan 57'; Cahill 73', 90+1'	Stadium: Pamir Stadium; Referee: Jameel Abdulhusin (Bahrain)

8 October 2015 2018 WCQ	Kyrgyzstan	2 – 2	Tajikistan	Bishkek, Kyrgyzstan
19:00 TJT (UTC+5)	Duyshobekov 7'; Zemlianukhin 90+4' (pen.)	Report (FIFA); Report (AFC)	Dzhalilov 65'; Nazarov 71' (pen.)	Stadium: Spartak Stadium; Attendance: 17,600; Referee: Mooud Bonyadifar (Iran)

13 October 2015 2018 WCQ	Jordan	3 – 0	Tajikistan	Irbid, Jordan
21:00 TJT (UTC+5)	Al-Dardour 65', 90+4'; Abdel-Fattah 67'	Report (FIFA); Report (AFC)		Stadium: Al-Hassan Stadium; Attendance: 15,000; Referee: Abdullah Al Hilali (Oman)

12 November 2015 2018 WCQ	Tajikistan	5 – 0	Bangladesh	Dushanbe, Tajikistan
TJT (UTC+5)	Dzhalilov 16', 26', 59', 73'; Nazarov 51' (pen.)	Report (FIFA); Report (AFC)		Stadium: Pamir Stadium; Referee: Ali Sabah Adday Al-Qaysi (Iraq)

==== 2016 ====
24 March 2016 2018 WCQ	Australia	7 – 0	Tajikistan	Adelaide, Australia
14:00 TJT (UTC+5)	Luongo 2'; Jedinak 13' (pen.); Milligan 57' (pen.); Burns 67', 88'; Rogic 70', 72'	Report (FIFA); Report (AFC)		Stadium: Adelaide Oval; Referee: Fahad Al-Marri (Qatar)

29 March 2016 2018 WCQ	Tajikistan	0 – 1	Kyrgyzstan	Dushanbe, Tajikistan
19:00 TJT (UTC+5)		Report (FIFA); Report (AFC)	Lux 18'	Stadium: Pamir Stadium; Attendance: 7,500; Referee: Aziz Asimov (Uzbekistan)

2 June 2016 2019 ACQ	Tajikistan	5 – 0	Bangladesh	Dushanbe, Tajikistan
20:00 TJT (UTC+5)	J.Ergashev 19', 30'; Umarbayev 33'; D.Ergashev 49'; Sharipov 71'	Report		Stadium: Pamir Stadium; Attendance: 8,332; Referee: Hanna Hattab (Syria)

7 June 2016 2019 ACQ	Bangladesh	0 – 1	Tajikistan	Dhaka, Bangladesh
17:00 TJT (UTC+5)		Report	Nazarov 8'	Stadium: Bangabandhu National Stadium; Referee: Hussein Abo Yehia (Lebanon)

27 August 2016 Friendly	Tajikistan	0 – 0	Syria	Khujand, Tajikistan
TJT (UTC+5)		Report		Stadium: 20 Years of Independence Stadium

6 September 2016 Friendly	Palestine	1 – 1	Tajikistan	Hebron, Palestine
20:00 TJT (UTC+5)	Salom 50' (pen.)	Report	Umarbayev 39'	Stadium: Dora International Stadium

5 October 2016 Friendly	Tajikistan	3 – 3	Palestine	Dushanbe, Tajikistan
TJT (UTC+5)	Davronov 22' (pen.); D.Ergashev 60'; Umarbayev 90+3'	Report	Cantillana 52' (pen.); Seyam 57'; A.Ahmed 69'	Stadium: Pamir Stadium; Attendance: 16,400; Referee: Denis Izmailov (Kazakhstan)

9 November 2016 Friendly	Tajikistan	3 – 0	Turkmenistan	Dushanbe, Tajikistan
17:00 TJT (UTC+5)	Dzhalilov 35', 39', 60'	Report		Stadium: Pamir Stadium; Attendance: 11,000; Referee: Denis Izmailov (Kazakhstan)

13 November 2016 Friendly	Tajikistan	1 – 0	Afghanistan	Dushanbe, Tajikistan
16:00 TJT (UTC+5)	Dzhalilov 74'	Report		Stadium: Pamir Stadium; Attendance: 13,000; Referee: Oleksandr Aliyev (Kazakhstan)

==== 2017 ====
24 March 2017 Friendly	Bahrain	1 – 1	Tajikistan	Riffa, Bahrain
21:00 TJT (UTC+5)	Aladhem 90+4'	Report	Dzhalilov 4'	Stadium: Bahrain National Stadium

28 March 2017 2019 ACQ	Yemen	2 – 1	Tajikistan	Doha, Qatar (Note: Yemen played their home matches in Qatar due to security concerns from the Saudi Arabian-led intervention in Yemen.)
21:00 TJT (UTC+5)	D.Ergashev 41' (o.g.); Al-Sasi 63'	Report	Umarbayev 9'	Stadium: Suheim Bin Hamad Stadium; Attendance: 380; Referee: Nagor Amir Noor Mohamed (Malaysia)

13 June 2017 2019 ACQ	Tajikistan	3 – 4	Philippines	Dushanbe, Tajikistan
21:00 TJT (UTC+5)	Umarbayev 57' (pen.); Vasiev 61'; Dzhalilov 90'	Report	P. Younghusband 28'; Patiño 41', 48'; Sato 79'	Stadium: Pamir Stadium; Attendance: 15,000; Referee: Hanna Hattab (Syria)

5 September 2017 2019 ACQ	Nepal	1 – 2	Tajikistan	Kathmandu, Nepal
14:15 TJT (UTC+5)	Magar 61'	Report	Dzhalilov 25'; Vasiev 29'	Stadium: ANFA Complex; Attendance: 1,200; Referee: Mohammed Al-Hoish (Saudi Arabia)

10 October 2017 2019 ACQ	Tajikistan	3 – 0	Nepal	Hisor, Tajikistan
18:00 TJT (UTC+5)	Davronov 21' (pen.); Umarbayev 60' (pen.); Dzhalilov 87' (pen.)	Report		Stadium: Hisor Central Stadium; Attendance: 12,000; Referee: Mooud Bonyadifar (Iran)

14 November 2017 2019 ACQ	Tajikistan	0 – 0	Yemen	Hisor, Tajikistan
16:00 TJT (UTC+5)		Report		Stadium: Hisor Central Stadium; Referee: Hussein Abo Yehia (Lebanon)

==== 2018 ====
27 March 2018 2019 ACQ	Philippines	2 – 1	Tajikistan	Manila, Philippines
16:30 TJT (UTC+5)	Ingreso 74'; P. Younghusband 90+1' (pen.)	Report	Nazarov 64' (pen.)	Stadium: Rizal Memorial Stadium; Attendance: 4,671; Referee: Jarred Gillett (Australia)

2 October 2018 Friendly	Nepal	0 – 2	Tajikistan	Sylhet, Bangladesh
17:30 TJT (UTC+5)		Report	Fatkhuloev 27' (pen.); Tursunov 69'	Stadium: Sylhet District Stadium; Referee: Shen Yinhao (China)

4 October 2018 Friendly	Tajikistan	0 – 2	Palestine	Sylhet, Bangladesh
17:30 TJT (UTC+5)		Report	Cantillana 1'; Bahdari 75'	Stadium: Sylhet District Stadium; Referee: Mizanur Rahman (Bangladesh)

9 October 2018 Friendly	Philippines	0 – 2	Tajikistan	Cox's Bazar, Bangladesh
13:30 TJT (UTC+5)		Report	Tursunov 31'; Nazarov 90+7'	Stadium: Cox's Bazar Stadium; Referee: Mahmood Al-Majarafi (Oman)

12 October 2018 Friendly	Tajikistan	0 – 0 (a.e.t.) (3 – 4 p)	Palestine	Dhaka, Bangladesh
17:30 TJT (UTC+5)		Report		Stadium: Bangabandhu National Stadium; Referee: Mizanur Rahman (Bangladesh)
	Penalties
	O. Abdugafforov (penalty scored); Nazarov (penalty scored); Asrorov (penalty scored); Tursunov (penalty missed); Davlatmir (penalty missed)		(penalty scored) Cantillana; (penalty scored) Al-Iwisat; (penalty scored) Al-Batat; (penalty scored) Bahdari

13 December 2018 Friendly	Oman	2 – 1	Tajikistan	Muscat, Oman
19:30 TJT (UTC+5)	Al-Ghassani 74'; Abd Raboh 76'	Report	Solehov 90'	Stadium: Sultan Qaboos Sports Complex; Attendance: 1,500; Referee: Mohammad Arafah (Jordan)

16 December 2018 Friendly	Oman	1 – 0	Tajikistan	Muscat, Oman
19:30 TJT (UTC+5)	Al Hajri 58'	Report		Stadium: Sultan Qaboos Sports Complex; Referee: Ahmed El Sayed (Egypt)

20 December 2018 Friendly	Bahrain	5 – 0	Tajikistan	Isa Town, Bahrain
16:00 TJT (UTC+5)	Al Romaihi 29'; Rashid 43', 75'; Madan 61'; Al-Husaini 85'	Report		Stadium: Khalifa Sports City Stadium; Attendance: 20; Referee: Ammar Ashkanani (Kuwait)

==== 2019 ====
7 June 2019 Friendly	Tajikistan	1 – 1	Afghanistan	Dushanbe, Tajikistan
20:00 TJT (UTC+5)	Samiev 88'	Report	Haydary 72'	Stadium: Pamir Stadium; Attendance: 13,500; Referee: Nasrullo Kabirov (Tajikistan)

11 June 2019 Friendly	China	1 – 0	Tajikistan	Guangzhou, China
21:00 TJT (UTC+5)	Yang Xu 10'	Report		Stadium: Tianhe Stadium; Attendance: 39,931; Referee: Ravshan Irmatov (Uzbekistan)

7 July 2019 Intercontinental Cup	India	2 – 4	Tajikistan	Ahmedabad, India
19:30 TJT (UTC+5)	Chhetri 4' (pen.), 41'	FFT AIFF	Tursunov 56'; Boboev 58'; Rahimov 71'; Samiev 75'	Stadium: TransStadia Arena; Attendance: 7,293; Referee: Jasur Mukhtarov (Uzbekistan)

10 July 2019 Intercontinental Cup	Tajikistan	2 – 0	Syria	Ahmedabad, India
19:30 TJT (UTC+5)	Tursunov 46'; Barotov 67'	FFT AIFF		Stadium: TransStadia Arena; Attendance: 732; Referee: Rahul Kumar Gupta (India)

15 July 2019 Intercontinental Cup	North Korea	1 – 0	Tajikistan	Ahmedabad, India
19:30 TJT (UTC+5)	Ri Hyong-jin 33'	FFT AIFF		Stadium: TransStadia Arena; Attendance: 634; Referee: Venkatesh Ramachandran (India)

19 July 2019 Intercontinental Cup	Tajikistan	0 – 1	North Korea	Ahmedabad, India
19:30 TJT (UTC+5)		FFT AIFF	Pak Hyon-il 71'	Stadium: TransStadia Arena; Attendance: 1,832; Referee: Akhrol Riskullaev (Uzbekistan)

5 September 2019 2022 WCQ	Tajikistan	1 – 0	Kyrgyzstan	Dushanbe, Tajikistan
19:00 TJT (UTC+5)	A. Dzhalilov 41'	Report (FIFA); Report (AFC)		Stadium: Pamir Stadium; Attendance: 18,700; Referee: Adham Makhadmeh (Jordan)

10 September 2019 2022 WCQ	Mongolia	0 – 1	Tajikistan	Ulanbaatar, Mongolia
14:00 TJT (UTC+5)		Report (FIFA); Report (AFC)	D. Ergashev 81'	Stadium: MFF Football Centre; Attendance: 3,455; Referee: Hanna Hattab (Syria)

15 October 2019 2022 WCQ	Tajikistan	0 – 3	Japan	Dushanbe, Tajikistan
17:15 TJT (UTC+5)		Report (FIFA); Report (AFC)	Minamino 53', 55'; Asano 82'	Stadium: Pamir Stadium; Referee: Zaid Thamer (Iraq)

9 November 2019 Friendly	Malaysia	1 – 0	Tajikistan	Kuala Lumpur, Malaysia
17:45 TJT (UTC+5)	Safawi 72'	Report		Stadium: Bukit Jalil National Stadium; Referee: Razlan Joffri Ali (Malaysia)

14 November 2019 2022 WCQ	Myanmar	4 – 3	Tajikistan	Yangon, Myanmar
15:30 TJT (UTC+5)	Suan Lam Mang 10', 41'; Sithu Aung 48'; Maung Maung Lwin 63'	Report (FIFA); Report (AFC)	M. Dzhalilov 36' (pen.), 76'; Vosiyev 57'	Stadium: Thuwunna Stadium; Attendance: 7,365; Referee: Masoud Tufayelieh (Syria)

19 November 2019 2022 WCQ	Kyrgyzstan	1 – 1	Tajikistan	Bishkek, Kyrgyzstan
19:00 TJT (UTC+5)	Kozubaev 83'	Report (FIFA); Report (AFC)	Ergashev 17'	Stadium: Dolen Omurzakov Stadium; Attendance: 15,843; Referee: Abdulrahman Al-Jassim (Qatar)

=== 2020–2029 ===
Type	GP	W	D	L	GF	GA
Friendly Matches	24	8	6	10	27	29
2022 FIFA World Cup qualification	3	2	0	1	8	4
2023 AFC Asian Cup qualification	3	2	1	0	5	0
2022 King's Cup	2	1	1	0	2	1
2023 CAFA Nations Cup	3	0	2	1	3	7
Merdeka Tournament	3	1	1	1	2	1
2026 FIFA World Cup qualification	6	2	2	2	11	7
2023 AFC Asian Cup	5	1	2	2	3	4
2024 King's Cup	2	0	0	2	0	4
2027 AFC Asian Cup qualification	6	4	2	0	14	3
2025 CAFA Nations Cup	3	1	1	1	5	4
2024 King's Cup	1	1	0	0	1	0
Total	61	23	18	20	80	66

==== 2020 ====
3 September 2020 Friendly	Uzbekistan	2 – 1	Tajikistan	Tashkent, Uzbekistan
TJT (UTC+5)	Ubaydullaev 33'; Kholmukhamedov 67' (pen.)	Report	Dzhuraboyev 48'	Stadium: Lokomotiv Stadium; Referee: Arol Riskullaev (Uzbekistan)

7 November 2020 Friendly	Bahrain	1 – 0	Tajikistan	Dubai, United Arab Emirates
20:30 TJT (UTC+5)	Al Romaihi 44'	Report		Stadium: Police Officers' Club Stadium; Referee: Ahmed Issa Darwish (UAE)

12 November 2020 Friendly	United Arab Emirates	3 – 2	Tajikistan	Dubai, United Arab Emirates
19:00 TJT (UTC+5)	Mabkhout 29', 63' (pen.); Saleh 90+3'	Report	D.Ergashev 10'; Tursunov 20'	Stadium: Police Officers' Club Stadium

==== 2021 ====
1 February 2021 Friendly	Jordan	2 – 0	Tajikistan	Dubai, United Arab Emirates
TJT (UTC+5)	Hamdouni 37' (pen.); Abu Zrayq 44'	Report		Stadium: UAE Football Association stadium

5 February 2021 Friendly	Jordan	0 – 1	Tajikistan	Dubai, United Arab Emirates
TJT (UTC+5)		Report	A.Dzhalilov 79'	Stadium: UAE Football Association stadium

25 March 2021 2022 WCQ	Tajikistan	3 – 0	Mongolia	Dushanbe, Tajikistan
18:00 TJT (UTC+5)	M.Dzhalilov 36'; A.Dzhalilov 50'; Samiev 86'	Report		Stadium: Pamir Stadium; Referee: Ali Al Qaysi (Iraq)

24 May 2021 Friendly	Iraq	0 – 0	Tajikistan	Basra, Iraq
21:30 TJT (UTC+5)				Stadium: Al Fayhaa Stadium; Referee: Ismaeel Habib (Bahrain)

29 May 2021 Friendly	Thailand	2 – 2	Tajikistan	Sharjah, United Arab Emirates
20:45 TJT (UTC+5)	Mueanta 54', 60'		Panjshanbe 63'; Zoirov 89'	Stadium: Khalid bin Mohammed Stadium

7 June 2021 2022 WCQ	Japan	4 – 1	Tajikistan	Suita, Japan
15:30 TJT (UTC+5)	Furuhashi 6'; Minamino 40'; Hashimoto 51'; Kawabe 71'	Report	Panjshanbe 9'	Stadium: Panasonic Stadium Suita; Referee: Abdelreham Al Jassim (Qatar)

15 June 2021 2022 WCQ	Tajikistan	4 – 0	Myanmar	Osaka, Japan
15:28 TJT (UTC+5)	Tursunov 34'; M.Dzhalilov 53'; Boboev 78'; Samiev 87'	Report		Stadium: Yanmar Stadium Nagai; Referee: Omar Mohamed Al-Ali (United Arab Emirates)

16 November 2021 Friendly	Kazakhstan	1 – 0	Tajikistan	Nur-Sultan, Kazakhstan
18:00 TJT (UTC+5)	Zaynutdinov 12'	Report		Stadium: Astana Arena; Referee: Amine Kourgheli (Belarus)

==== 2022 ====
25 March 2022 Navruz Cup	Uganda	1–1 (5–4 p)	Tajikistan	Namangan, Uzbekistan
16:30 UTC+6	Okwi 7'	Report	A.Dzhalilov 39'	Referee: R. Lutfullin (Uzbekistan)
	Penalties
	Kyambadde (penalty scored); Lwaliwa (penalty scored); Kakooza (penalty scored); Mato (penalty scored); Okello (penalty missed); Bayo (penalty scored)		(penalty scored) Umarbayev; (penalty missed) Ayni (penalty scored) Nazarov; (penalty scored) Ergashev; (penalty scored) Soirov; (penalty missed) Z.Dzhuraboyev

29 March 2022 Navruz Cup	Tajikistan	1–0	Kyrgyzstan	Namangan, Uzbekistan
16:30 UTC+6	Umarbayev 54'	Report		Referee: R. Lutfullin (Uzbekistan)

1 June 2022 Friendly	Syria	1–0	Tajikistan	Bishkek, Kyrgyzstan
20:00 UTC+6	Al Somah 16'	Report		Attendance: 300; Referee: Mohammed Abdullah Mohammed (United Arab Emirates)

8 June 2022 AFC AC Q	Tajikistan	4–0	Myanmar	Bishkek, Kyrgyzstan
16:30 UTC+6	Mabatshoev (9}), 57'; Dzhalilov 56' (pen.); Panjshanbe 84'	Report		Stadium: Dolen Omurzakov Stadium; Referee: Ammar Mahfoodh (Bahrain)

11 June 2022 AFC AC Q	Singapore	0–1	Tajikistan	Bishkek, Kyrgyzstan
16:30 UTC+6		Report	Mabatshoev 53'	Stadium: Dolen Omurzakov Stadium; Attendance: 84; Referee: Mohammad Ghabayen (Jordan)

14 June 2022 AFC AC Q	Kyrgyzstan	0–0	Tajikistan	Bishkek, Kyrgyzstan
21:00 UTC+6		Report		Stadium: Dolen Omurzakov Stadium; Referee: Ko Hyung-jin (South Korea)

22 September 2022 2022 King's Cup	Trinidad and Tobago	1–2	Tajikistan	Chiang Mai, Thailand
16:30 UTC+6	J. García 27'	Report	Rakhimov 47'; Panjshanbe 75'	Stadium: 700th Anniversary Stadium; Attendance: 7,288

25 September 2022 2022 King's Cup	Tajikistan	0–0 (3–0 p)	Malaysia	Chiang Mai, Thailand
18:30 UTC+6		Report		Stadium: 700th Anniversary Stadium
	Penalties
	Nazarov (penalty missed); Khanonov (penalty scored); Tursunov (penalty scored); Soirov (penalty scored)		(penalty missed) Cools; (penalty missed) Faiz; (penalty missed) Rasid

17 November 2022 Friendly	Tajikistan	0–0	Russia	Dushanbe, Tajikistan
20:00 UTC+5		Report		Stadium: Pamir Stadium; Referee: Ilgiz Tantashev (Uzbekistan)

==== 2023 ====
25 March 2023 Friendly	United Arab Emirates	0–0	Tajikistan	Abu Dhabi, United Arab Emirates
23:00 UTC+5		Report		Stadium: Al Nahyan Stadium; Referee: Ammar Ashkanani (Kuwait)

28 March 2023 Friendly	Kuwait	2–1	Tajikistan	Kuwait City, Kuwait
23:59 UTC+5	Al-Fadhel 9'; Al-Khaldi 61'	Report	A.Dzhalilov 90'	Stadium: Jaber Al-Ahmad International Stadium; Attendance: 1,000; Referee: Ahmed Abu Bakar Saeed Al Kaf (Oman)

11 June 2023 2023 CAFA Nations Cup	Tajikistan	1–1	Turkmenistan	Tashkent, Uzbekistan
18:30 UTC+5	Khamrokulov 86'	Report	Annaýew 57'	Stadium: Pakhtakor Central Stadium; Attendance: 100; Referee: Hassan Akrami (Iran)

14 June 2023 2023 CAFA Nations Cup	Oman	1–1	Tajikistan	Tashkent, Uzbekistan
18:30 UTC+5	Al-Yahyaei 14' (pen.)	Report	Khanonov 45'	Stadium: Pakhtakor Central Stadium; Attendance: 150; Referee: Kirill Levnikov (Russia)

17 June 2023 2023 CAFA Nations Cup	Uzbekistan	5–1	Tajikistan	Tashkent, Uzbekistan
20:30 UTC+5	Yakhshiboev 53'; Shomurodov 56' (pen.); Fayzullaev 72'; Erkinov 83'; Urunov 90+6' (pen.)	Report	Umarbayev 14'	Stadium: Milliy Stadium; Attendance: 9,099; Referee: Hassan Akrami (Iran)

8 September 2023 Friendly	Singapore	0–2	Tajikistan	Bishan, Singapore
16:30 UTC+5		Report	Rakhimov 6'; Khanonov 90+6'	Stadium: Bishan Stadium; Referee: Thoriq Alkatiri (Indonesia)

17 October 2023 2023 Merdeka Tournament	Malaysia	0–2	Tajikistan	Kuala Lumpur, Malaysia
18:00 UTC+5		Report	Soirov 44'; Samiev 88'	Stadium: Bukit Jalil National Stadium; Attendance: 36,558; Referee: Hoàng Ngọc Hà (Vietnam)

16 November 2023 2026 WCQ / 2027 ACQ	Tajikistan	1–1	Jordan	Dushanbe, Tajikistan
18:00 UTC+5	Samiev 89'	Report	Al-Naimat 90+3'	Stadium: Pamir Stadium; Referee: Ali Sabah (Iraq)

21 November 2023 2026 WCQ / 2027 ACQ	Pakistan	1–6	Tajikistan	Islamabad, Pakistan
14:00 UTC+5	Nabi 21'	Report	Kamolov 9', 65'; Soirov 13'; Umarbayev 27'; Panjshanbe 45'; Samiev 90'	Stadium: Jinnah Sports Stadium; Referee: Yusuke Araki (Japan)

==== 2024 ====
13 January 2024 2023 AFC Asian Cup	China	0–0	Tajikistan	Doha, Qatar
19:30 UTC+5		Report		Stadium: Abdullah bin Khalifa Stadium; Attendance: 4,001; Referee: Mohammed Al Hoaish (Saudi Arabia)

17 January 2024 2023 AFC Asian Cup	Tajikistan	0–1	Qatar	Al Khor, Qatar
19:30 UTC+5		Report	Afif 17'	Stadium: Al Bayt Stadium; Referee: Hiroyuki Kimura (Japan)

22 January 2024 2023 AFC Asian Cup	Tajikistan	2–1	Lebanon	Al Rayyan, Qatar
20:00 UTC+5	Umarbayev 80'; Khamrokulov 90+1'	Report	Jradi 47'	Stadium: Jassim bin Hamad Stadium; Referee: Mohanad Qasim Sarray (Iraq)

28 January 2024 2023 AFC Asian Cup	Tajikistan	1–1 (a.e.t.) (5–3 p)	United Arab Emirates	Al Rayyan, Qatar
21:00 UTC+5	Hanonov 30'	Report	Al Hammadi 90+5'	Stadium: Ahmad bin Ali Stadium; Attendance: 33,584; Referee: Yusuke Araki (Japan)
	Penalties
	Nazarov (penalty scored); Khanonov (penalty scored); Panjshanbe (penalty scored); Soirov (penalty scored); Shukurov (penalty scored)		(penalty scored) Idrees; (penalty missed) Caio; (penalty scored) Lima; (penalty scored) Saleh

2 February 2024 2023 AFC Asian Cup QF	Tajikistan	0–1	Jordan	Al Rayyan, Qatar
16:30 UTC+5		Report	Hanonov 66' (o.g.)	Stadium: Ahmad bin Ali Stadium; Attendance: 35,530; Referee: Fu Ming (China)

22 March 2024 2026 WCQ / 2027 ACQ	Saudi Arabia	1–0	Tajikistan	Riyadh, Saudi Arabia
00:00 UTC+5	Al-Dawsari 23'	Report		Stadium: King Saud University Stadium; Attendance: 18,756; Referee: Muhammad Taqi (Singapore)

26 March 2024 2026 WCQ / 2027 ACQ	Tajikistan	1–1	Saudi Arabia	Dushanbe, Tajikistan
20:00 UTC+5	Soirov 80'	Report	Al-Buraikan 46'	Stadium: Pamir Stadium; Referee: Kim Jong-hyeok (South Korea)

6 June 2024 2026 WCQ / 2027 ACQ	Jordan	3–0	Tajikistan	Amman, Jordan
22:30 UTC+5	Olwan 51'; Al-Naimat 68'; Sadeh 90+4'	Report (FIFA); Report (AFC)		Stadium: Amman International Stadium; Attendance: 14,795; Referee: Ahmed Al-Kaf (Oman)

11 June 2024 2026 WCQ / 2027 ACQ	Tajikistan	3–0	Pakistan	Dushanbe, Tajikistan
20:00 UTC+5	Mabatshoev 35'; Safarov 65'; Hanonov 70'	Report (FIFA); Report (AFC)		Stadium: Pamir Stadium; Attendance: 7,800; Referee: Mooud Bonyadifard (Iran)

4 September 2024 2024 Merdeka Tournament SF	Lebanon	1–0	Tajikistan	Kuala Lumpur, Malaysia
13:30 UTC+5	Ayoub 13'	Report		Stadium: Bukit Jalil National Stadium; Attendance: 460

8 September 2024 2024 Merdeka Tournament Third place	Tajikistan	0–0 (4–3 p)	Philippines	Kuala Lumpur, Malaysia
13:30 UTC+5				Stadium: Bukit Jalil National Stadium
	Penalties
	Nazarov (penalty scored); Umarbayev (penalty missed); Sharipov (penalty scored); Safarov (penalty scored); Shukurov (penalty scored)		(penalty missed) Tabinas; (penalty missed) Gayoso; (penalty scored) Tabinas; (penalty scored) Monis; (penalty scored) Rontini

11 October 2024 2024 King's Cup SF	Syria	1–0	Tajikistan	Songkhla, Thailand
14:30 UTC+5	Osman 35'	Report		Stadium: Tinsulanon Stadium; Attendance: 13,588

14 October 2024 2024 King's Cup Third place	Tajikistan	0–3	Philippines	Songkhla, Thailand
14:30 UTC+5		Report	Holtmann 47'; J. Tabinas 58'; Bailey 62'	Stadium: Tinsulanon Stadium; Attendance: 9,664

13 November 2024 Friendly	Tajikistan	4–0	Nepal	Dushanbe, Tajikistan
18:00 UTC+5	Mabatshoev 19', 44'; A.Dzhalilov 29', 50'	Report		Stadium: Pamir Stadium

19 November 2024 Friendly	Tajikistan	3–1	Afghanistan	Dushanbe, Tajikistan
18:00 UTC+5	Juraboev 11'; Samiev 27'; Yatimov (red card) 39'; Soirov 70'	Report	Asekzai 37'	Stadium: Pamir Stadium; Attendance: 12,350

==== 2025 ====
20 March 2025 Friendly	Tajikistan	0–5	Belarus	Dushanbe, Tajikistan
16:00 UTC+5		Report	Lisakovich 64'; Melnichenko 73'; Yablonsky 84'; Sedko 87'; Barkouski 90+2'	Stadium: Pamir Stadium; Attendance: 6,300; Referee: Rustam Lutfullin (Uzbekistan)

25 March 2025 2027 AFC Asian Cup qualification	Tajikistan	1–0	Timor-Leste	Dushanbe, Tajikistan
16:00 UTC+5	Hanonov 3'	Report		Stadium: Pamir Stadium; Attendance: 8,520; Referee: Seyedvahid Kazemi (Iran)

5 June 2025 Friendly	Cambodia	1–2	Tajikistan	Phnom Penh, Cambodia
17:00 UTC+5	Ratanak 71'	Report	Samiev 51'; Panjshanbe 63'	Stadium: Olympic Stadium; Attendance: 13,780

10 June 2025 2027 AFC Asian Cup qualification	Philippines	2–2	Tajikistan	Capas, Philippines
16:00 UTC+5	Kristensen 28', 79'	Report	Mabatshoyev 30'; Umarbayev 42' (pen.)	Stadium: New Clark City Athletics Stadium; Attendance: 10,854; Referee: Hasan Akrami (Iran)

29 August 2025 2025 CAFA Nations Cup	Tajikistan	1–2	India	Hisor, Tajikistan
20:30 UTC+5	Samiev 23'	Report	Anwar 5'; Jhingan 13'	Stadium: Hisor Central Stadium; Attendance: 17,450; Referee: Firdavs Nosafarov (Uzbekistan)

1 September 2025 2025 CAFA Nations Cup	Tajikistan	2–0	Afghanistan	Hisor, Tajikistan
--:-- UTC+5	Panjshanbe 24' (pen.); Mabatshoyev 90+3'	Report		Stadium: Hisor Central Stadium; Attendance: 15,265

4 September 2025 2025 CAFA Nations Cup	Tajikistan	2–2	Iran	Hisor, Tajikistan
--:-- UTC+5	Samiev 58'; Dzhuraboyev 77'	Report	Me.Mohebi 38'; Mo.Mohebi 47'	Stadium: Hisor Central Stadium; Attendance: 18,200

9 October 2025 2027 AFC Asian Cup qualification	Tajikistan	2–0	Maldives	Hisor, Tajikistan
18:00 UTC+5	Samiev 8'; Mabatshoyev 30'	Report		Stadium: Central Stadium; Attendance: 5,250; Referee: Zayniddin Alimov (Kyrgyzstan)

14 October 2025 2027 AFC Asian Cup qualification	Maldives	0–3	Tajikistan	Malé, Maldives
17:00 UTC+5		Report	Safarov 4'; Mabatshoyev 34', 78'	Stadium: National Football Stadium; Attendance: 3,120; Referee: Mohanad Qasim Sarray (Iraq)

18 November 2025 2027 AFC Asian Cup qualification	Timor-Leste	0–5	Tajikistan	Darwin (Australia) (Note: Timor-Leste will play their home games outside the country, due to a lack of an available venue that meet FIFA standards.)
17:00 UTC+5		Report	Mabatshoyev 22', 43'; Panjshanbe 25'; Rakhimov 82'; Boboev 86'	Stadium: Territory Rugby League Stadium; Referee: Adam Kersey (Australia)

==== 2026 ====
31 March 2026 2027 AFC Asian Cup qualification	Tajikistan	1–1	Philippines	Hisor, Tajikistan
19:00 UTC+5	Boboev 41'	Report	Obermair 19'	Stadium: Central Stadium; Attendance: 15,200; Referee: Hiroki Kasahara (Japan)

5 June 2026 Friendly	Tajikistan	3–1	India	Tursunzoda, Tajikistan
--:-- UTC+5	Boboev 9' (pen.); Karimov 62'; Panjshanbe 68'		Choudhary 89'	Stadium: TALCO Arena; Attendance: 10,245; Referee: Asker Nadjafaliev (Uzbekistan)

9 June 2026 Friendly	Tajikistan	1–1	India	Tursunzoda, Tajikistan
--:-- UTC+5	Boboev 85' (pen.)	Report	V. P. Singh 25'	Stadium: TALCO Arena; Attendance: 9,370; Referee: Akhrol Riskulloev (Uzbekistan)

23 September 2026 Friendly	Azerbaijan	1–0	Tajikistan	Baku, Azerbaijan
21:00 UTC+5	Baklov 58' (o.g.)	Report		Stadium: Palms Sports Arena; Referee: Roman Jitari (Moldova)

28 September 2026 Friendly	Tajikistan	2–4	Palestine	Chongqing, China
21:00 UTC+5	Boboev 4' (pen.); Babadjanov 24'; Dzhuraboyev (yellow card) (yellow-red card) 53'	Report	Al Hamlawi 21', 45+2'; Hassan 46'; Dabbagh 74'	Stadium: Tongliang Long Stadium

6 October 2026 Friendly	China	0–1	Tajikistan	Chongqing, China
16:35 UTC+5		Report	Hanonov 53'	Stadium: Longxing Football Stadium

14 November 2026 King's Cup	Oman	0–1	Tajikistan	Sisaket, Thailand
14:00 UTC+5		Report	Boboev 60' (pen.)	Stadium: Sisaket Provincial Stadium; Attendance: 3,713

17 November 2026 King's Cup	Tajikistan	v	Thailand	Sisaket, Thailand
17:30 UTC+5				Stadium: Sisaket Provincial Stadium

== Non-FIFA matches ==
=== 1992 ===
17 June 1992 Non-FIFA	Tajikistan	2 – 2	Uzbekistan	Dushanbe, Tajikistan

11 July 1992 Non-FIFA	Turkmenistan	3 – 3	Tajikistan	Ashgabat, Turkmenistan

=== 1993 ===
2 June 1993 Non-FIFA	Turkmenistan	6 – 0	Tajikistan	Ashgabat, Turkmenistan

6 June 1993 Non-FIFA	Azerbaijan	2 – 0	Tajikistan	Iran

8 June 1993 Non-FIFA	Kyrgyzstan	1 – 1	Tajikistan	Iran

13 June 1993 Non-FIFA	Iran	1 – 0	Tajikistan	Iran

=== 2024 ===
4 January 2024 Unofficial Friendly	Hong Kong	1–2	Tajikistan	Abu Dhabi, United Arab Emirates
17:00 UTC+5	Camargo 33'	Report	Soirov 25'; Samiev 51'	Stadium: Zayed Cricket Training Centre; Attendance: 0

== Result by nations ==
As of match played 14 November 2026

Opponents	Played	Won	Drawn*	Lost	GF	GA	GD	% Won
Afghanistan	8	7	1	0	17	12	+15	87.5
Australia	2	0	0	2	0	10	-10	0
Azerbaijan	2	0	0	2	2	4	-2	0
Bahrain	5	0	2	3	1	11	-10	0
Bangladesh	10	7	2	1	29	5	+24	70
Belarus	2	0	0	2	1	11	-10	0
Bhutan	1	1	0	0	3	1	+2	100
Brunei	1	1	0	0	4	0	+4	100
Cambodia	2	2	0	0	5	1	+4	100
China	7	1	2	4	2	9	-7	14.29
Estonia	1	0	0	1	1	2	-1	0
Hong Kong	2	1	1	0	1	0	+1	50
Guam	1	1	0	0	16	0	+16	100
India	8	4	2	2	16	11	+5	50
Iran	4	0	1	3	3	15	-12	0
Iraq	2	0	1	1	1	2	-1	0
Japan	4	0	0	4	1	19	-18	0
Jordan	7	1	1	5	3	13	-10	14.29
Kazakhstan	5	0	1	4	3	9	-6	0
Kuwait	2	0	0	2	1	5	-4	0
Kyrgyzstan	14	8	3	3	16	10	+6	57.14
Lebanon	2	1	0	1	2	2	0	50
Macau	2	2	0	0	7	0	+7	100
Malaysia	4	2	1	1	6	2	+4	50
Maldives	5	4	1	0	10	0	+10	80
Mongolia	2	2	0	0	4	0	+4	100
Myanmar	5	4	0	1	15	4	+11	80
Nepal	4	4	0	0	11	1	+10	100
North Korea	6	1	1	4	2	6	-4	16.67
Oman	7	2	2	3	10	12	-2	28.57
Pakistan	4	4	0	0	12	1	+11	100
Palestine	5	0	3	2	6	10	-4	0
Philippines	9	1	4	4	10	14	-4	11.11
Qatar	5	1	0	4	3	11	-8	20
Russia	1	0	1	0	0	0	0	0
Saudi Arabia	3	0	1	2	1	5	-4	0
Singapore	4	2	1	1	4	3	+1	50
South Korea	1	0	0	1	1	4	-3	0
Sri Lanka	4	3	1	0	11	3	+8	75
Syria	9	3	1	5	11	8	+3	33.33
Thailand	3	1	1	1	3	3	0	33.33
Timor-Leste	2	2	0	0	6	0	+6	100
Trinidad and Tobago	1	1	0	0	2	1	+1	100
Turkmenistan	7	3	2	2	11	6	+5	42.86
Uganda	1	0	1	0	1	1	0	0
United Arab Emirates	3	0	2	1	3	4	-1	0
Uzbekistan	9	1	2	6	8	21	-13	11.11
Vietnam	2	2	0	0	8	0	+8	100
Yemen	4	1	1	2	3	4	-1	25
Total	204	81	43	80	297	266	+31	39.71

== International Goalscorers ==
All goalscorers from International Matches.

As of match played 14 November 2026

20 goals

- Manuchekhr Dzhalilov

15 goals

- Yusuf Rabiev

14 goals

- Numonjon Hakimov

13 goals

- Shahrom Samiev
- Shervoni Mabatshoev

11 goals

- Parvizdzhon Umarbayev

10 goals

- Tokhirjon Muminov

9 goals

- Dilshod Vasiev
- Ehson Panjshanbe

8 goals

- Sheriddin Boboev
- Nuriddin Davronov
- Davron Ergashev
- Fatkhullo Fatkhuloev
- Dzhomikhon Mukhidinov

7 goals

- Alisher Dzhalilov
- Ibrahim Rabimov

6 goals

- Alier Ashurmamadov
- Vahdat Hanonov
- Shuhrat Jabborov
- Komron Tursunov

5 goals

- Arsen Avakov
- Sukhrob Khamidov
- Khurshed Makhmudov
- Akhtam Nazarov
- Rustam Soirov

4 goals

- Jahongir Ergashev
- Akhtam Khamrakulov
- Rustam Khojayev
- Muhammadjon Rakhimov
- Kamil Saidov

3 goals

- Zakir Berdikulov
- Pirmurod Burkhanov
- Zoir Dzhuraboyev
- Jamshed Ismailov
- Vyacheslav Knyazev

2 goals

- Umed Alidodov
- Rahmatullo Fuzailov
- Amadoni Kamolov
- Nuriddin Khamrokulov
- Akmal Kholmatov
- Manuchekhr Safarov
- Davronjon Tukhtasunov

1 goals

- Nozim Babadjanov
- Ilhomjon Barotov
- Rahmonali Barotov
- Farrukh Choriyev
- Konstantin Erofeev
- Khakim Fuzailov
- Mansur Hakimov
- Odil Irgashev
- Amirbek Juraboev
- Mekhrubon Karimov
- Denis Knitel
- Denis Kulbayev
- Oraz Nazarov
- Aleksey Negmatov
- Shujoat Nematov
- Dmitry Saltsman
- Umedzhon Sharipov
- Valentin Shashkov
- Sharafdzhon Solehov
- Sokhib Suvonkulov
- Farkhod Tokhirov
- Daler Tukhtasunov
- Alisher Tukhtaev
- Rustam Usmonov
- Farkhod Vosiyev
- Rustam Zabirov
- Islom Zoirov

Own goal

- Ruslan Sydykov (Kyrgyzstan)

Awarded Goals

- 6vs Syria (23/28 July 2011)
