= Football at the 1998 Asian Games – Men's team squads =

Below are the squads for the men's football tournament at the 1998 Asian Games, played in Bangkok, Thailand.

== Group A ==
=== South Korea ===
Coach: Huh Jung-moo

No.	Pos.	Player	Date of birth (age)	Club
1	GK	Kim Byung-ji	8 April 1970 (aged 28)	(Korea Football Association) Ulsan Hyundai Horangi
2	DF	Choi Sung-yong	25 December 1975 (aged 22)	(Korea Football Association) Sangmu
3	DF	Kim Hyun-su	14 February 1973 (aged 25)	(Korea Football Association) Sangmu
4	DF	Park Jin-sub	11 March 1977 (aged 21)	(Korea Football Association) Korea University
5	DF	Sim Jae-won	11 March 1977 (aged 21)	(Korea Football Association) Yonsei University
6	MF	Yoo Sang-chul	18 October 1971 (aged 27)	(Korea Football Association) Ulsan Hyundai Horangi
7	MF	Seo Ki-bok	28 January 1979 (aged 19)	(Korea Football Association) Yonsei University
8	MF	Yoon Jong-hwan	16 February 1973 (aged 25)	(Korea Football Association) Bucheon SK
9	FW	Kim Eun-jung	8 April 1979 (aged 19)	(Korea Football Association) Daejeon Citizen
10	FW	Choi Yong-soo	10 September 1973 (aged 25)	(Korea Football Association) Sangmu
11	FW	Park Byung-joo	5 October 1977 (aged 21)	(Korea Football Association) Hansung University
12	MF	Lee Byung-keun	28 April 1973 (aged 25)	(Korea Football Association) Suwon Samsung Bluewings
13	MF	Kim Nam-il	14 March 1977 (aged 21)	(Korea Football Association) Hanyang University
14	FW	An Hyo-yeon	16 April 1978 (aged 20)	(Korea Football Association) Dongguk University
15	DF	Cho Se-kwon	26 June 1978 (aged 20)	(Korea Football Association) Korea University
16	DF	Kim Sung-keon	20 June 1977 (aged 21)	(Korea Football Association) Yonsei University
17	MF	Choi Yoon-yeol	17 April 1974 (aged 24)	(Korea Football Association) Jeonnam Dragons
18	GK	Kim Yong-dae	11 October 1979 (aged 19)	(Korea Football Association) Yonsei University
19	DF	Park Dong-hyuk	18 April 1979 (aged 19)	(Korea Football Association) Korea University
20	FW	Lee Dong-gook	29 April 1979 (aged 19)	(Korea Football Association) Pohang Steelers

=== Turkmenistan ===
Coach: (Ukraine) Viktor Pozhechevskyi

No.	Pos.	Player	Date of birth (age)	Club
2	DF	Andreý Homin	24 May 1968 (aged 30)	(Ukrainian Association of Football) Vorskla Poltava
3	DF	Wladimir Halikow	26 February 1972 (aged 26)	(Football Federation of Turkmenistan) Köpetdag Aşgabat
4	DF	Konstantin Sosenko	26 September 1969 (aged 29)	(Ukrainian Association of Football) Dnipro Dnipropetrovsk
5	DF	Ýuriý Bordolimow	24 January 1970 (aged 28)	(Football Federation of Turkmenistan) Nisa Aşgabat
6	MF	Gurbangeldi Durdyýew	12 January 1973 (aged 25)	(Football Federation of Turkmenistan) Köpetdag Aşgabat
7	MF	Dmitriý Homuha	23 August 1969 (aged 29)	(Russian Football Union) CSKA Moscow
8	MF	Andreý Zawýalow	2 January 1971 (aged 27)	(Ukrainian Association of Football) Metalurh Donetsk
9	FW	Muslim Agaýew	29 April 1974 (aged 24)	(Football Federation of Turkmenistan) Köpetdag Aşgabat
10	FW	Roman Bondarenko	14 August 1966 (aged 32)	(Ukrainian Association of Football) Torpedo Zaporizhzhia
11	FW	Rejepmyrat Agabaýew	1 August 1973 (aged 25)	(Football Federation of Turkmenistan) Nisa Aşgabat
12	GK	Aleksandr Korobko	16 January 1970 (aged 28)	(Football Federation of Turkmenistan) Köpetdag Aşgabat
15	FW	Igor Kislow	19 July 1966 (aged 32)	(Ukrainian Association of Football) Zirka Kropyvnytskyi
16	MF	Denis Peremenin	4 January 1976 (aged 22)	(Football Federation of Turkmenistan) Köpetdag Aşgabat
18	MF	Dmitriý Neželew	27 February 1970 (aged 28)	(Russian Football Union) Gazovik-Gazprom Izhevsk
19	DF	Ýuriý Magdiýew	2 December 1971 (aged 27)	(Football Federation of Turkmenistan) Köpetdag Aşgabat
20	MF	Begençmuhammet Kulyýew	4 April 1977 (aged 21)	(Football Federation of Turkmenistan) Köpetdag Aşgabat

=== Vietnam ===
Coach: (Austria) Alfred Riedl

No.	Pos.	Player	Date of birth (age)	Caps	Club
1	GK	Trần Tiến Anh	12 August 1972 (aged 26)		(Vietnam) Thể Công
3	DF	Nguyễn Thiện Quang	13 March 1970 (aged 28)		(Vietnam) Hồ Chí Minh City Police
4	DF	Nguyễn Hữu Thắng	2 December 1972 (aged 25)		(Vietnam) Sông Lam Nghệ An
5	DF	Đỗ Mạnh Dũng	6 January 1970 (aged 28)		(Vietnam) Thể Công
6	DF	Nguyễn Đức Thắng	28 May 1976 (aged 22)		(Vietnam) Thể Công
7	DF	Đỗ Văn Khải	1 April 1974 (aged 24)		(Vietnam) Hải Quan
8	MF	Nguyễn Hồng Sơn	9 October 1970 (aged 27)		(Vietnam) Thể Công
9	FW	Văn Sỹ Hùng	1 September 1970 (aged 27)		(Vietnam) Sông Lam Nghệ An
10	FW	Lê Huỳnh Đức	20 April 1972 (aged 26)		(Vietnam) Hồ Chí Minh City Police
11	MF	Nguyễn Văn Sỹ	21 November 1971 (aged 26)		(Vietnam) Nam Định
12	GK	Nguyễn Văn Phụng	12 February 1968 (aged 30)		(Vietnam) Hà Nội
14	FW	Nguyễn Văn Dũng	23 November 1963 (aged 34)		(Vietnam) Nam Định
15	MF	Phùng Thanh Phương	30 March 1978 (aged 20)		(Vietnam) Hồ Chí Minh City Police
17	MF	Triệu Quang Hà	3 September 1975 (aged 22)		(Vietnam) Thể Công
18	MF	Vũ Minh Hiếu	11 June 1972 (aged 26)		(Vietnam) Hà Nội
19	MF	Trương Việt Hoàng	9 December 1975 (aged 22)		(Vietnam) Thể Công
20	DF	Trần Công Minh (c)	1 September 1970 (aged 27)		(Vietnam) Đồng Tháp
24	FW	Nguyễn Tuấn Thành	26 July 1976 (aged 22)		(Vietnam) Hà Nội

== Group B ==
=== Cambodia ===
Coach: (Germany) Joachim Fickert

No.	Pos.	Player	Date of birth (age)	Club
1	GK	Bun Nhem Ton		
20	GK	Chamrong Ouk		
2	DF	Vuthy Thon		
3	DF	Him Pros		
4	DF	Mony Sok		
5	DF	Pechkiri Sou		
6	DF	Sophanarit Oum		
12	DF	Maline Choun		
13	DF	Samkai Hem		
14	DF	Raksmey Lim		
7	MF	Sovannara Prak		
8	MF	Samchai Hem		
9	MF	Vuthy Prak		
15	MF	Soky Lay		
16	MF	So Serei Vuth		
17	MF	Sib Sovannarith		
18	MF	Phanarith Phum		
19	FW	Arunreath Chan		
21	MF	Savong Oum		
22	FW	Ny Taing		
23	DF	Krochenda Ing		
10	FW	Hok Sochetra	27 July 1974 (aged 24)	
11	MF	Nuth Sony		

=== China ===
Coach: (England) Bob Houghton

No.	Pos.	Player	Date of birth (age)	Club
1	GK	Jiang Jin	17 October 1969 (aged 29)	(Chinese Football Association) Bayi
2	DF	Ma Yongkang	9 March 1977 (aged 21)	(Chinese Football Association) Qingdao Yizhong Hainiu
3	DF	Zhang Enhua	11 May 1974 (aged 24)	(Chinese Football Association) Dalian Wanda
4	DF	Sun Jihai	30 September 1977 (aged 21)	(The Football Association) Crystal Palace
5	DF	Fan Zhiyi	22 January 1970 (aged 28)	(The Football Association) Crystal Palace
6	MF	Li Tie	18 May 1977 (aged 21)	(Chinese Football Association) Liaoning Tianrun
7	MF	Zhao Junzhe	18 April 1979 (aged 19)	(Chinese Football Association) Liaoning Tianrun
8	MF	Ma Mingyu	10 August 1972 (aged 26)	(Chinese Football Association) Sichuan Quanxing
9	FW	Hao Haidong	25 August 1970 (aged 28)	(Chinese Football Association) Dalian Wanda
10	FW	Yang Chen	17 January 1974 (aged 24)	(German Football Association) Eintracht Frankfurt
11	FW	Bian Jun	15 July 1977 (aged 21)	(Chinese Football Association) Shanghai Shenhua
12	MF	Sui Dongliang	24 September 1977 (aged 21)	(Chinese Football Association) Bayi
13	FW	Wang Peng	16 June 1978 (aged 20)	(Chinese Football Association) Dalian Wanda
14	DF	Shu Chang	24 February 1977 (aged 21)	(Chinese Football Association) Shandong Luneng
15	MF	Huang Yong	26 August 1978 (aged 20)	(Chinese Football Association) Bayi
16	MF	Yao Xia	28 September 1976 (aged 22)	(Chinese Football Association) Sichuan Quanxing
17	DF	Li Weifeng	26 January 1978 (aged 20)	(Chinese Football Association) Shenzhen Pingan
18	FW	Li Jinyu	6 November 1977 (aged 21)	(French Football Federation) Nancy
19	GK	Chen Dong	3 May 1978 (aged 20)	(Chinese Football Association) Dalian Wanda
20	MF	Chi Rongliang	9 January 1978 (aged 20)	(Chinese Football Association) Tianjin Dingxin

=== Lebanon ===
Coach: (Egypt) Mahmoud Saad

No.	Pos.	Player	Date of birth (age)	Club
	FW	Sarkis Abajian		(Lebanese Football Association) Homenmen
	DF	Daniel Al Aawar		(Lebanese Football Association) Safa
	FW	Zaher Al Indari	26 May 1971 (aged 27)	(Lebanese Football Association) Akhaa Ahli Aley
	DF	Nabih Al Jurdi		(Lebanese Football Association) Safa
	GK	Tarek Al Samad		
	DF	Faisal Antar	20 December 1978 (aged 19)	(Lebanese Football Association) Tadamon Sour
	MF	Roda Antar	12 September 1980 (aged 18)	(Lebanese Football Association) Tadamon Sour
	DF	Abbas Chahrour	1 January 1972 (aged 26)	(Lebanese Football Association) Nejmeh
	GK	Wahid El Fattal	1 June 1978 (aged 20)	(Lebanese Football Association) Nejmeh
	DF	Gevorg Karapetyan	15 December 1963 (aged 34)	(Lebanese Football Association) Al-Ansar
	FW	Vardan Ghazaryan	1 October 1969 (aged 29)	(Lebanese Football Association) Homenetmen
	MF	Fouad Hijazi	27 June 1973 (aged 25)	(Lebanese Football Association) Sagesse
	MF	Moussa Hojeij	6 August 1974 (aged 24)	(Lebanese Football Association) Nejmeh
	FW	Tero Kehyeyan	15 November 1970 (aged 28)	(Lebanese Football Association) Homenetmen
	DF	Ali Mteirek	15 January 1978 (aged 20)	(Lebanese Football Association) Tadamon Sour
	DF	Ahmad El Naamani	12 October 1979 (aged 19)	(Lebanese Football Association) Safa
	GK	Ahmad Sakr	7 April 1970 (aged 28)	(Lebanese Football Association) Homenmen
	FW	Ghassan Shweikh	4 June 1975 (aged 23)	(Lebanese Football Association) Bourj
	MF	Jamal Taha	23 November 1966 (aged 32)	(Lebanese Football Association) Al-Ansar
	FW	Haitham Zein	6 January 1979 (aged 19)	(Lebanese Football Association) Tadamon Sour
	MF	Mohammad Abou-Alewo (unused)		(Lebanese Football Association) Nejmeh
		Issak		Unknown

== Group C ==
=== India ===
Coach: Syed Nayeemuddin

No.	Pos.	Player	Date of birth (age)	Club
1	GK	Juje Siddi	15 January 1973 (aged 25)	(All India Football Federation) Salgaocar
2	DF	K. V. Dhanesh	13 February 1973 (aged 25)	(All India Football Federation) Kochin
3	DF	Franky Barreto		(All India Football Federation) East Bengal
4	DF	Roberto Fernandez	2 November 1971 (aged 27)	(All India Football Federation) Salgaocar
5	DF	Jiju Jacob	25 December 1967 (aged 30)	(All India Football Federation) State Bank of Travancore
6	MF	Shanmugam Venkatesh	21 November 1978 (aged 20)	(All India Football Federation) Salgaocar
7	MF	Basudeb Mondal	6 July 1974 (aged 24)	(All India Football Federation) East Bengal
8	FW	Syed Sabir Pasha	5 November 1972 (aged 26)	(All India Football Federation) Indian Bank
9	FW	Raman Vijayan	4 June 1973 (aged 25)	(All India Football Federation) East Bengal
10	FW	I. M. Vijayan	25 April 1969 (aged 29)	(All India Football Federation) Mohun Bagan
11	MF	Jo Paul Ancheri	2 August 1975 (aged 23)	(All India Football Federation) Mohun Bagan
12	MF	Debjit Ghosh	23 February 1974 (aged 24)	(All India Football Federation) Mohun Bagan
13	GK	Feroz Sherif	22 May 1971 (aged 27)	(All India Football Federation) State Bank of Travancore
14	MF	Carlton Chapman	13 April 1971 (aged 27)	(All India Football Federation) East Bengal
15	FW	Bhaichung Bhutia	15 December 1976 (aged 21)	(All India Football Federation) East Bengal
16	DF	Anit Ghosh	24 March 1977 (aged 21)	(All India Football Federation) East Bengal
17	FW	Abdul Khalique		(All India Football Federation) Bengal Mumbai
18	MF	Tushar Rakshit	4 February 1968 (aged 30)	(All India Football Federation) East Bengal
19	MF	Shamsi Reza		(All India Football Federation) Mahindra & Mahindra
21	GK	Hemanta Dora	4 December 1973 (aged 25)	(All India Football Federation) Mohun Bagan

=== Japan ===
Coach: (France) Philippe Troussier

No.	Pos.	Player	Date of birth (age)	Club
1	GK	Yuta Minami	30 September 1979 (aged 19)	(Japan Football Association) Kashiwa Reysol
2	DF	Satoshi Yamaguchi	17 April 1978 (aged 20)	(Japan Football Association) JEF United Chiba
3	DF	Seiji Kaneko	27 May 1980 (aged 18)	(Japan Football Association) Higashi Fukuoka High School
4	MF	Kazuyuki Toda	30 December 1977 (aged 20)	(Japan Football Association) Shimizu S-Pulse
5	DF	Tsuneyasu Miyamoto	7 February 1977 (aged 21)	(Japan Football Association) Gamba Osaka
6	MF	Tomokazu Myojin	24 January 1978 (aged 20)	(Japan Football Association) Kashiwa Reysol
7	MF	Junichi Inamoto	18 September 1979 (aged 19)	(Japan Football Association) Gamba Osaka
8	FW	Nozomi Hiroyama	6 May 1977 (aged 21)	(Japan Football Association) JEF United Chiba
9	FW	Kenji Fukuda	21 October 1977 (aged 21)	(Japan Football Association) Nagoya Grampus Eight
10	MF	Seiji Koga	7 August 1979 (aged 19)	(Japan Football Association) Yokohama Marinos
11	FW	Yoshiteru Yamashita	21 November 1977 (aged 21)	(Japan Football Association) Avispa Fukuoka
12	DF	Masahiro Koga	8 September 1978 (aged 20)	(Japan Football Association) Nagoya Grampus Eight
13	MF	Shinji Ono	27 September 1979 (aged 19)	(Japan Football Association) Urawa Red Diamonds
14	MF	Toshiya Ishii	19 January 1978 (aged 20)	(Japan Football Association) Urawa Red Diamonds
15	MF	Shunsuke Nakamura	24 June 1978 (aged 20)	(Japan Football Association) Yokohama Marinos
16	GK	Tatsuya Enomoto	16 March 1979 (aged 19)	(Japan Football Association) Yokohama Marinos
17	DF	Yusuke Nakatani	22 September 1978 (aged 20)	(Japan Football Association) Nagoya Grampus Eight
18	DF	Kazuki Teshima	7 June 1979 (aged 19)	(Japan Football Association) Yokohama Flügels
19	DF	Daisuke Ichikawa	14 May 1980 (aged 18)	(Japan Football Association) Shimizu S-Pulse
20	FW	Naohiro Takahara	4 June 1979 (aged 19)	(Japan Football Association) Júbilo Iwata

=== Nepal ===
Coach: (South Korea) Yoo Kee-heung

No.	Pos.	Player	Date of birth (age)	Club
1	GK	Sanjeev Joshi	13 December 1979 (aged 18)	(All Nepal Football Association) Ranipokhari Corner
4	DF	Samir Nemkul		
6	DF	Sandesh Shrestha	10 October 1979 (aged 19)	(All Nepal Football Association) Manang Marshyangdi
7	MF	Kumar Thapa	18 August 1981 (aged 17)	
9	MF	Naresh Joshi	13 December 1979 (aged 18)	(All Nepal Football Association) Ranipokhari Corner
11	FW	Hari Khadka	26 November 1976 (aged 22)	(All India Football Federation) Kerala Police
12	MF	Deepak Amatya		
13	MF	Sunil Tulandhar	8 October 1977 (aged 21)	(All Nepal Football Association) Manang Marshyangdi
14	MF	Bal Gopal Maharjan	28 August 1975 (aged 23)	(All Nepal Football Association) Friends
16	FW	Basant Thapa	10 April 1977 (aged 21)	(All Nepal Football Association) Manang Marshyangdi
17	DF	Rakesh Shrestha	14 January 1977 (aged 21)	(All Nepal Football Association) Mahendra Police
19	FW	Sukra Tamang	25 December 1976 (aged 21)	(All Nepal Football Association) Friends
22	GK	Ram Chauladhari		

== Group D ==
=== Maldives ===
Coach: (Uzbekistan) Vyacheslav Solokho

No.	Pos.	Player	Date of birth (age)	Club
1	GK	Abdul Raheem Aslam	24 June 1971 (aged 27)	
23	GK	Mohamed Iqbal	27 June 1966 (aged 32)	
22	GK	Ishak Essa	24 June 1971 (aged 27)	
2	DF	Mohammed Ibrahim	7 November 1970 (aged 28)	
3	DF	Ahmed Azmoon		
4	DF	Ahmed Amir Mohamed		
5	DF	Moosa Manik		
6	DF	Ismail Anil		
12	DF	Ali Shahin		
13	DF	Ahmed Haleem		
7	MF	Ibrahim Rasheed		
8	MF	Ashraf Luthfy		
9	MF	Ismail Mahfooz		
10	FW	Adam Abdul Latheef	20 August 1972 (aged 26)	
14	MF	Ismail Asif		
11	FW	Mohamed Nizam "Thoddoo"		
15	FW	Ismail Shah		
16	FW	Abdul Ghafour Mausoom		
17	MF	Saeed Lirugam		
18	MF	Hassan Nashid		

=== Qatar ===
No.	Pos.	Player	Date of birth (age)	Club
	DF	Nayef Mubarak Al-Khater	10 May 1978 (aged 20)	(Qatar Football Association) Al-Wakrah
	FW	Mubarak Al-Kuwari		
	MF	Abdulnasser Al-Obaidly	2 October 1972 (aged 26)	(Qatar Football Association) Al-Sadd
	MF	Jassim Al-Tamimi	14 February 1971 (aged 27)	(Qatar Football Association) Al-Wakrah
	MF	Nabil Anwar	10 October 1976 (aged 22)	
	MF	Abdulaziz Karim	20 December 1979 (aged 18)	(Qatar Football Association) Al-Arabi
	MF	Yousuf Adam Mahmoud	12 September 1972 (aged 26)	
	FW	Mubarak Mustafa	30 March 1973 (aged 25)	(Qatar Football Association) Al-Arabi
	DF	Waleed Nahnak	17 February 1977 (aged 21)	

=== Tajikistan ===
Coach: Zoir Babaev

No.	Pos.	Player	Date of birth (age)	Club
	MF	Zakir Berdikulov	28 May 1972 (aged 26)	(Uzbekistan Football Association) Neftchi Fergana
	GK	Akhmed Engurazov	10 August 1965 (aged 33)	(Russian Football Union) Gigant Voskresensk
	FW	Shuhrat Jabborov	30 November 1973 (aged 25)	(Uzbekistan Football Association) Sogdiana Jizzakh
	GK	Zafar Karimov		
	DF	Rustam Khaidaraliyev	21 April 1971 (aged 27)	(Russian Football Union) Torpedo Arzamas
	DF	Vitaliy Levchenko	28 March 1972 (aged 26)	(Ukrainian Association of Football) CSKA Kyiv
	MF	Tokhirjon Muminov	20 August 1970 (aged 28)	(Uzbekistan Football Association) Andijon
	DF	Sergey Piskarev	31 August 1972 (aged 26)	(Russian Football Union) Saturn Ramenskoye
	MF	Dmitry Saltsman	11 January 1974 (aged 24)	
	FW	Rustam Zabirov	23 October 1966 (aged 32)	(Uzbekistan Football Association) Zarafshon Navoi

== Group E ==
=== North Korea ===
Coach: An Se-uk

No.	Pos.	Player	Date of birth (age)	Club
		An Yong-bin		
		Chon Kwon		
	GK	Han Song-ho		
		Hyon Yong-chol		
	MF	Jon Yong-chol	18 July 1974 (aged 24)	
	DF	Jo In-chol		
		Ju Song-il	24 October 1973 (aged 25)	
		Kang Jong-nam		
		Kang Sun-il		
		Kim Gwang-chol		
		Kim Jin-guk		
		Ko Jong-nam		
	GK	Pak Kyong-chol		
		Ri Chang-gyu		
		Ri Chang-ha		
	DF	Ri Man-chol	19 June 1978 (aged 20)	
		Rim Kun-uk		
	FW	So Min-chol	29 October 1978 (aged 20)	

=== United Arab Emirates ===
Coach: (Portugal) Carlos Queiroz

No.	Pos.	Player	Date of birth (age)	Club
1	GK	Juma Rashed	12 December 1972 (aged 25)	(United Arab Emirates Football Association) Al-Shabab
2	DF	Abdulrahman Ibrahim	9 November 1974 (aged 24)	(United Arab Emirates Football Association) Al-Shaab
3	DF	Abdullah Salem	26 May 1975 (aged 23)	(United Arab Emirates Football Association) Al-Wahda
4	DF	Fahad Ali Al-Shamsi	28 December 1976 (aged 21)	(United Arab Emirates Football Association) Al-Ain
5	DF	Abdulsalam Jumaa	23 May 1977 (aged 21)	(United Arab Emirates Football Association) Al-Wahda
6	FW	Adel Matar		(United Arab Emirates Football Association) Al-Wahda
7	DF	Adel Nasib		(United Arab Emirates Football Association) Al-Jazira
8	MF	Abdulrahim Jumaa	23 May 1979 (aged 19)	(United Arab Emirates Football Association) Al-Wahda
9	MF	Hassan Saeed	15 November 1973 (aged 25)	(United Arab Emirates Football Association) Al-Ittihad Kalba
10	MF	Mohamed Ibrahim Al-Bloushi	22 June 1977 (aged 21)	(United Arab Emirates Football Association) Al-Nasr
11	DF	Kazem Ali	14 November 1978 (aged 20)	(United Arab Emirates Football Association) Al-Nasr
12	DF	Abdullah Eisa Al-Falasi	6 May 1977 (aged 21)	(United Arab Emirates Football Association) Al-Wasl
13	MF	Ali Saeed Ahmed	3 June 1977 (aged 21)	(United Arab Emirates Football Association) Al-Ittihad Kalba
14	MF	Sultan Rashed	5 December 1976 (aged 22)	(United Arab Emirates Football Association) Al-Ain
15	MF	Mohamed Ali Kasla	12 December 1965 (aged 32)	(United Arab Emirates Football Association) Al-Nasr
16	FW	Fahad Hassan Al-Nuwais		(United Arab Emirates Football Association) Al-Ain
19	FW	Ali Hassan Ghawas		(United Arab Emirates Football Association) Al-Wasl
20	GK	Abdulnasser Abdullah		
21	MF	Adel Mohamed	5 November 1974 (aged 24)	(United Arab Emirates Football Association) Al-Ittihad Kalba
22	GK	Hussain Ali Abdullah		(United Arab Emirates Football Association) Al-Wahda

== Group F ==
=== Hong Kong ===
Coach: (Brazil) Sebastião Araújo

No.	Pos.	Player	Date of birth (age)	Club
1	GK	Chung Ho Yin	15 April 1971 (aged 27)	(Football Association of Hong Kong, China) Instant-Dict
2	DF	Yau Kin Wai	4 January 1973 (aged 25)	(Football Association of Hong Kong, China) South China
3	DF	Leung Chi Wing	29 April 1978 (aged 20)	(Football Association of Hong Kong, China) South China
4	DF	Wong Wai Tak	8 July 1970 (aged 28)	(Football Association of Hong Kong, China) Happy Valley
5	DF	Poon Yiu Cheuk	19 September 1977 (aged 21)	(Football Association of Hong Kong, China) Happy Valley
6	MF	Lo Kai Wah	27 January 1971 (aged 27)	(Football Association of Hong Kong, China) Happy Valley
7	FW	Au Wai Lun	14 August 1971 (aged 27)	(Football Association of Hong Kong, China) South China
8	MF	Cheung Sai Ho	27 August 1975 (aged 23)	(Football Association of Hong Kong, China) Happy Valley
9	FW	Sung Lin Yung	7 May 1965 (aged 33)	(Football Association of Hong Kong, China) Sing Tao
10	FW	Poon Man Chun	27 April 1977 (aged 21)	(Football Association of Hong Kong, China) Sai Kung Friends
11	MF	Yeung Hei Chi	13 February 1975 (aged 23)	(Football Association of Hong Kong, China) Instant-Dict
12	MF	Kwok Yue Hung	28 February 1975 (aged 23)	(Football Association of Hong Kong, China) Happy Valley
13	DF	Fung Ka Ki	19 September 1977 (aged 21)	(Football Association of Hong Kong, China) Instant-Dict
14	MF	Chu Siu Kei	11 January 1980 (aged 18)	(Football Association of Hong Kong, China) Rangers
15	DF	Cheung Yiu Lun	2 March 1978 (aged 20)	(Football Association of Hong Kong, China) Rangers
16	DF	Lai Kai Cheuk	5 July 1977 (aged 21)	(Football Association of Hong Kong, China) Happy Valley
17	GK	Fan Chun Yip	1 May 1976 (aged 22)	(Football Association of Hong Kong, China) Instant-Dict
18	MF	Shum Kwok Pui	11 August 1970 (aged 28)	(Football Association of Hong Kong, China) South China

=== Oman ===
Coach: (Brazil) Valdeir Vieira

No.	Pos.	Player	Date of birth (age)	Club
	MF	Rashid Abdullah	17 December 1972 (aged 25)	
	DF	Jamal Nabi Al-Balushi	22 December 1981 (aged 16)	
	FW	Hani Al-Dhabit	15 October 1979 (aged 19)	(Oman Football Association) Dhofar
	MF	Mohsin Al-Harbi	22 September 1980 (aged 18)	(Oman Football Association) Sur
	MF	Badar Al-Mahruqy	12 December 1979 (aged 18)	(Oman Football Association) Fanja
	DF	Farid Al-Mazroui	1 December 1977 (aged 21)	
	GK	Sulaiman Al-Mazroui	13 September 1972 (aged 26)	(Oman Football Association) Muscat
	MF	Taqi Mubarak Al-Siyabi	20 August 1978 (aged 20)	
	DF	Khair Khadim	3 October 1976 (aged 22)	
	MF	Talal Khalfan	25 November 1980 (aged 18)	
	DF	Mohammed Khamis	16 November 1972 (aged 26)	
	MF	Qasim Masoud		
	FW	Majdi Shaaban	5 December 1978 (aged 20)	(Oman Football Association) Al-Nasr
	MF	Radhwan Salim	9 October 1980 (aged 18)	
	DF	Mohammed Zayid		

=== Thailand ===
Coach: (England) Peter Withe

No.	Pos.	Player	Date of birth (age)	Club
1	GK	Chaiyong Khumpiam	29 August 1965 (aged 33)	(Football Association of Thailand) Royal Thai Police
2	DF	Kritsada Piandit	2 December 1971 (aged 27)	(Football Association of Thailand) TOT
3	DF	Niweat Siriwong	18 July 1977 (aged 21)	(Football Association of Thailand) Sinthana
4	DF	Pattanapong Sripramote	3 February 1974 (aged 24)	(Football Association of Thailand) UCOM Rajpracha
5	DF	Choketawee Promrut	16 March 1975 (aged 23)	(Football Association of Thailand) Thai Farmers Bank
6	MF	Sanor Longsawang	2 December 1971 (aged 27)	(Football Association of Thailand) Thai Farmers Bank
7	DF	Natee Thongsookkaew	9 December 1966 (aged 31)	(Football Association of Thailand) Royal Thai Police
8	MF	Watcharakorn Antakhamphu	12 September 1974 (aged 24)	(Football Association of Thailand) Royal Thai Army
9	FW	Klairung Treejaksung	20 April 1973 (aged 25)	(Football Association of Thailand) Bangkok Bank
10	MF	Tawan Sripan	13 December 1971 (aged 26)	(Football Association of Thailand) Bangkok Bank of Commerce
11	MF	Thawatchai Damrong-ongtrakul	25 June 1974 (aged 24)	(Football Association of Thailand) Osotsapa
12	MF	Surachai Jaturapattarapong	20 November 1969 (aged 29)	(Football Association of Thailand) Stock Exchange of Thailand
13	FW	Kiatisuk Senamuang	11 August 1973 (aged 25)	(Football Association of Malaysia) Perlis
14	FW	Worrawoot Srimaka	8 December 1971 (aged 26)	(Football Association of Thailand) BEC Tero Sasana
15	MF	Sunai Jaidee	22 May 1976 (aged 22)	(Football Association of Thailand) Royal Thai Air Force
16	MF	Surachai Jirasirichote	13 October 1970 (aged 28)	(Football Association of Thailand) Sinthana
17	DF	Dusit Chalermsan	22 April 1970 (aged 28)	(Football Association of Thailand) BEC Tero Sasana
18	GK	Sarawut Kambua	21 July 1972 (aged 26)	(Football Association of Thailand) Krung Thai Bank
19	FW	Yuttapong Boonamporn	21 November 1976 (aged 22)	(Football Association of Thailand) Sinthana
20	DF	Panupong Chimpook		(Football Association of Thailand) Sinthana

== Group G ==
=== Kuwait ===
Coach: (Czech Republic) Milan Máčala

No.	Pos.	Player	Date of birth (age)	Club
1	GK	Khaled Al-Fadhli	15 May 1974 (aged 24)	(Kuwait Football Association) Kazma
2	DF	Naser Al-Omran	3 March 1977 (aged 21)	(Kuwait Football Association) Kazma
3	DF	Jamal Mubarak	21 March 1974 (aged 24)	(Kuwait Football Association) Al-Tadhamon
4	DF	Ali Abdulreda Asel	28 September 1976 (aged 22)	(Kuwait Football Association) Al-Salmiya
5	DF	Nohair Al-Shammari	12 July 1976 (aged 22)	(Kuwait Football Association) Al-Sulaibikhat
6	DF	Hussain Al-Khodari	7 February 1972 (aged 26)	(Kuwait Football Association) Al-Salmiya
7	MF	Bader Haji	19 December 1967 (aged 30)	(Saudi Arabian Football Federation) Al-Shabab
8	MF	Mohammad Al-Buraiki	10 July 1980 (aged 18)	(Kuwait Football Association) Al-Salmiya
9	MF	Ayman Al-Hussaini	22 November 1967 (aged 31)	(Kuwait Football Association) Kazma
10	FW	Hani Al-Saqer	8 January 1973 (aged 25)	(Kuwait Football Association) Al-Qadsia
11	FW	Faraj Laheeb	3 October 1978 (aged 20)	(Kuwait Football Association) Al-Kuwait
12	GK	Nawaf Al-Khaldi	25 May 1981 (aged 17)	(Kuwait Football Association) Khaitan
13	MF	Ahmad Al-Mutairi	13 February 1974 (aged 24)	(Kuwait Football Association) Kazma
14	MF	Khaled Abdulqoddus	9 June 1980 (aged 18)	(Kuwait Football Association) Al-Arabi
15	MF	Saleh Al-Buraiki	27 February 1977 (aged 21)	(Kuwait Football Association) Al-Salmiya
16	MF	Mohammad Jasem	28 December 1970 (aged 27)	(Kuwait Football Association) Al-Qadsia
17	DF	Esam Sakeen	2 July 1971 (aged 27)	(Kuwait Football Association) Kazma
18	MF	Naser Al-Othman	14 January 1977 (aged 21)	(Kuwait Football Association) Al-Salmiya
20	FW	Jasem Al-Huwaidi	28 October 1972 (aged 26)	(United Arab Emirates Football Association) Al-Shabab
22	GK	Ahmad Al-Jasem	29 May 1975 (aged 23)	(Kuwait Football Association) Al-Arabi

=== Mongolia ===
Coach: Lkhamsürengiin Dorjsüren

No.	Pos.	Player	Date of birth (age)	Club
1	GK	Purevsuren Jargalsaikhan	19 August 1985 (aged 13)	
20	GK	Enkhbayar Jargalsaikhan	31 July 1977 (aged 21)	
2	DF	Altangereliin Battulga		
3	DF	Munkhbat Chimeddorj	27 January 1976 (aged 22)	
4	DF	Choijil Altantogos	29 September 1970 (aged 28)	
5	DF	Davalkaa Erdene-Ochir	25 June 1975 (aged 23)	
6	DF	Donorov Lumbengarav	27 January 1977 (aged 21)	
17	DF	Tsogt Enkhtur	17 October 1970 (aged 28)	
13	DF	Sodovjamts Munkhgal	21 August 1971 (aged 27)	
14	DF	Tserenjavyn Enkhjargal	26 October 1984 (aged 14)	
8	MF	Galsannyam Altan-Ild	26 January 1975 (aged 23)	
9	MF	Dambiijav Terbaatar	11 January 1968 (aged 30)	
7	MF	Gongorjav Davaa-Ochir	5 September 1977 (aged 21)	
10	MF	Semjbaatar Baatarsuren	10 November 1975 (aged 23)	
11	MF	Sukhbaatar Gerelt-Od	3 September 1975 (aged 23)	
12	FW	Bole Buman Uchral	29 May 1971 (aged 27)	
15	FW	Davaa Bayarzorig	3 August 1975 (aged 23)	
16	FW	Munkhbaatar Suurisuren	19 August 1976 (aged 22)	
18	FW	Enkhbayar Chinzorig	14 November 1978 (aged 20)	

=== Uzbekistan ===
Coach: (Brazil) Ubirajara Veiga

No.	Pos.	Player	Date of birth (age)	Club
1	GK	Pavel Bugalo	21 August 1974 (aged 24)	(Uzbekistan Football Association) Pakhtakor Tashkent
2	DF	Andrey Rezantsev	15 October 1965 (aged 33)	(Russian Football Union) Krylia Sovetov Samara
3	DF	Rustam Shaymardanov	4 August 1976 (aged 22)	(Uzbekistan Football Association) Dustlik Tashkent
4	MF	Mirjalol Qosimov	17 September 1970 (aged 28)	(Uzbekistan Football Association) Pakhtakor Tashkent
5	MF	Eduard Momotov	22 January 1970 (aged 28)	(Uzbekistan Football Association) Navbahor Namangan
6	DF	Andrei Fyodorov	10 April 1971 (aged 27)	(Russian Football Union) Alania Vladikavkaz
7	DF	Aleksandr Khvostunov	9 January 1974 (aged 24)	(Uzbekistan Football Association) Pakhtakor Tashkent
8	MF	Sergey Lebedev	31 January 1969 (aged 29)	(Uzbekistan Football Association) Neftchi Fergana
9	MF	Nikolay Shirshov	22 June 1974 (aged 24)	(Uzbekistan Football Association) Pakhtakor Tashkent
10	FW	Igor Shkvyrin	29 April 1963 (aged 35)	(Uzbekistan Football Association) Pakhtakor Tashkent
11	FW	Andrey Akopyants	27 August 1977 (aged 21)	(Uzbekistan Football Association) Pakhtakor Tashkent
12	DF	Aleksey Semyonov	7 July 1968 (aged 30)	(Uzbekistan Football Association) Neftchi Fergana
14	DF	Bakhtiyor Qambaraliev	8 January 1973 (aged 25)	(Uzbekistan Football Association) MHSK Tashkent
15	DF	Sergey Lushan	14 June 1973 (aged 25)	(Russian Football Union) Krylia Sovetov Samara
17	MF	Rashidjon Gafurov	26 September 1977 (aged 21)	(Uzbekistan Football Association) Navbahor Namangan
18	FW	Nematullo Quttiboev	28 September 1973 (aged 25)	(Uzbekistan Football Association) Neftchi Fergana
19	MF	Shuhrat Rahmonqulov	19 April 1971 (aged 27)	(Uzbekistan Football Association) Navbahor Namangan
20	MF	Aleksandr Sayun	1 January 1975 (aged 23)	(Russian Football Union) Torpedo Moscow
24	GK	Oleg Belyakov	1 February 1972 (aged 26)	(Uzbekistan Football Association) Navbahor Namangan

== Group H ==
=== Iran ===
Coach: Mansour Pourheidari

No.	Pos.	Player	Date of birth (age)	Club
1	GK	Behzad Gholampour	23 December 1966 (aged 31)	(Football Federation Islamic Republic of Iran) PAS Tehran
2	MF	Mehdi Mahdavikia	24 July 1977 (aged 21)	(Football Federation Islamic Republic of Iran) Persepolis Tehran
3	DF	Javad Zarincheh	23 July 1966 (aged 32)	(Football Federation Islamic Republic of Iran) Esteghlal Tehran
4	DF	Mohammad Khakpour	20 February 1969 (aged 29)	(Football Federation Islamic Republic of Iran) Bahman Karaj
5	DF	Nader Mohammadkhani	23 August 1963 (aged 35)	(Football Federation Islamic Republic of Iran) Persepolis Tehran
6	MF	Karim Bagheri	20 February 1974 (aged 24)	(German Football Association) Arminia Bielefeld
7	MF	Alireza Mansourian	2 December 1971 (aged 27)	(Football Federation Islamic Republic of Iran) Esteghlal Tehran
8	MF	Sattar Hamedani	6 June 1974 (aged 24)	(Football Federation Islamic Republic of Iran) Bahman Karaj
9	MF	Hamid Estili	1 April 1967 (aged 31)	(Football Federation Islamic Republic of Iran) Persepolis Tehran
10	FW	Ali Daei	21 March 1969 (aged 29)	(German Football Association) Bayern Munich
11	FW	Ali Mousavi	22 April 1974 (aged 24)	(Football Federation Islamic Republic of Iran) Esteghlal Tehran
12	MF	Dariush Yazdani	2 June 1977 (aged 21)	(Football Federation Islamic Republic of Iran) Esteghlal Tehran
14	DF	Mohammad Navazi	5 September 1974 (aged 24)	(Football Federation Islamic Republic of Iran) Esteghlal Tehran
16	FW	Vahid Hashemian	21 July 1976 (aged 22)	(Football Federation Islamic Republic of Iran) PAS Tehran
17	MF	Ali Karimi	8 November 1978 (aged 20)	(Football Federation Islamic Republic of Iran) Persepolis Tehran
18	DF	Ali Janmaleki	19 August 1976 (aged 22)	(Football Federation Islamic Republic of Iran) PAS Tehran
19	FW	Rasoul Khatibi	22 September 1978 (aged 20)	(Football Federation Islamic Republic of Iran) PAS Tehran
20	MF	Mahmoud Fekri	26 July 1969 (aged 29)	(Football Federation Islamic Republic of Iran) Esteghlal Tehran
21	GK	Nima Nakisa	1 May 1975 (aged 23)	(Football Federation Islamic Republic of Iran) Persepolis Tehran
22	GK	Hamid Reza Babaei	22 April 1975 (aged 23)	(Football Federation Islamic Republic of Iran) Esteghlal Tehran

=== Kazakhstan ===
Coach: Sergey Gorokhovadatskiy

No.	Pos.	Player	Date of birth (age)	Club
1	GK	Oleg Voskoboynikov	4 July 1971 (aged 27)	(Kazakhstan Football Federation) Kaisar-Hurricane Kyzylorda
2	DF	Oleg Lotov	21 November 1975 (aged 23)	(Kazakhstan Football Federation) Vostok-Adil Oskemen
3	DF	Igor Soloshenko	22 May 1979 (aged 19)	(Kazakhstan Football Federation) Shakhter Karagandy
4	DF	Andrey Tetushkin	19 August 1971 (aged 27)	(Kazakhstan Football Federation) Batyr Ekibastuzets
5	MF	Yevgeniy Sveshnikov	6 October 1973 (aged 25)	(Kazakhstan Football Federation) Vostok-Adil Oskemen
6	MF	Ruslan Baltiev	16 September 1978 (aged 20)	(Kazakhstan Football Federation) Kairat Almaty
7	MF	Askhat Kadyrkulov	14 November 1974 (aged 24)	(Kazakhstan Football Federation) Taraz Dzhambul
8	FW	Rafael Urazbakhtin	20 November 1978 (aged 20)	(Kazakhstan Football Federation) Kairat Almaty
9	FW	Viktor Zubarev	10 April 1973 (aged 25)	(Kazakhstan Football Federation) Irtysh Pavlodar
10	FW	Guram Makayev	18 February 1970 (aged 28)	(Kazakhstan Football Federation) Batyr Ekibastuzets
11	FW	Vladimir Loginov	5 January 1974 (aged 24)	(Kazakhstan Football Federation) Kaisar-Hurricane Kyzylorda
12	DF	Nurmat Mirzabayev	11 November 1972 (aged 26)	(Kazakhstan Football Federation) Taraz Dzhambul
13	MF	Vladimir Kashtanov	16 February 1973 (aged 25)	(Kazakhstan Football Federation) Vostok-Adil Oskemen
14	MF	Pavel Yevteyev	23 June 1967 (aged 31)	(Kazakhstan Football Federation) Vostok-Adil Oskemen
15	DF	Andrey Travin	27 April 1979 (aged 19)	(Kazakhstan Football Federation) Kairat Almaty
16	DF	Sergey Konovalenko	2 September 1974 (aged 24)	(Kazakhstan Football Federation) Irtysh Pavlodar
17	DF	Sergey Kirov	4 February 1978 (aged 20)	(Kazakhstan Football Federation) Kairat Almaty
18	MF	Azamat Niyazymbetov	25 March 1974 (aged 24)	(Kazakhstan Football Federation) Taraz Dzhambul
19	MF	Rafael Khamidullov	21 March 1976 (aged 22)	(Kazakhstan Football Federation) Vostok-Adil Oskemen
20	GK	Naken Kyrykbaev	29 August 1975 (aged 23)	(Kazakhstan Football Federation) Taraz Dzhambul

=== Laos ===
No.	Pos.	Player	Date of birth (age)	Club
1	GK	Soulivanh Xenvilay	14 March 1963 (aged 35)	
2	DF	Khamsay Chantavong	28 March 1972 (aged 26)	
3	DF	Phonepadith Xayavong	1 March 1972 (aged 26)	
4	DF	Vilayphone Xayavong	4 September 1973 (aged 24)	
5	MF	Chalana Luang-Amath	10 May 1972 (aged 26)	
6	MF	Kholadeth Phonephachan	20 October 1980 (aged 17)	
7		Khanthilath Phalangthong		
8		Bounmy Thamavongsa	22 December 1971 (aged 26)	
9	FW	Bounlap Khenkitisack	19 June 1966 (aged 32)	
10		Bousokvanh Bounlanh		
11	MF	Sonesavanh Insisengway	28 June 1969 (aged 29)	
12		Keodala Somsack		
13	FW	Keolakhone Channiphone	10 January 1970 (aged 28)	
14		Lovankham Maykhen		
15	MF	Khonesavanh Homsombath	23 October 1972 (aged 25)	
16	FW	Soubinh Keophet	20 January 1981 (aged 17)	
17	GK	Douangdala Somsack	24 April 1980 (aged 18)	
18	DF	Ananh Thepsouvanh	21 October 1981 (aged 16)	
19	GK	Somsack Douangdala	24 April 1980 (aged 18)	
20	MF	Bounmy Thammavongsa	21 December 1971 (aged 26)	
