= Upendra Man Singh =

Nepalese footballer

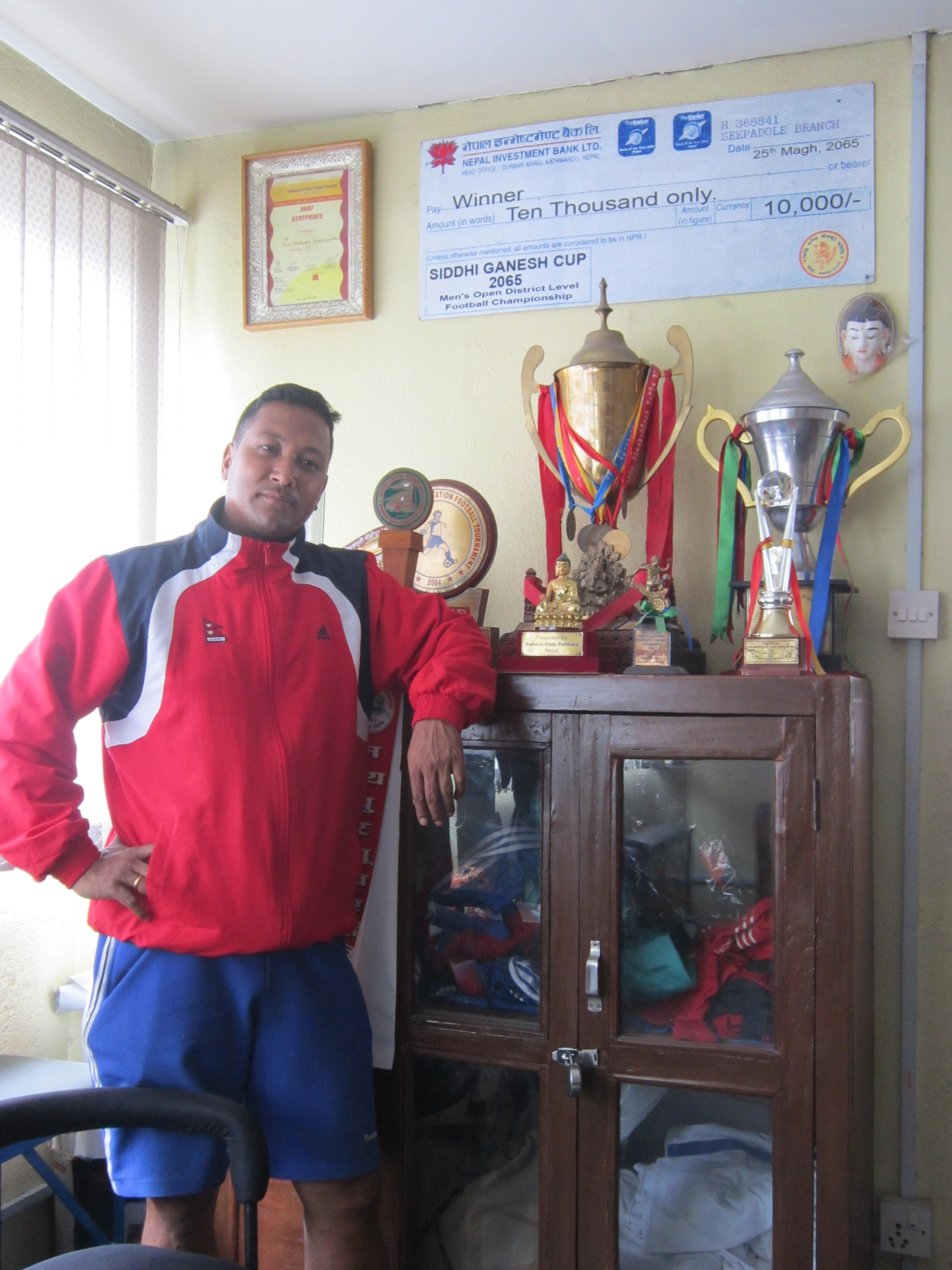
- Upendra Man Singh with his awards

Personal information
- Date of birth: 27 July 1973 (age 53)
- Place of birth: Kathmandu, Nepal

International career
Years	Team	Apps	(Gls)
1993–2003	Nepal	34	(0)

Upendra Man Singh (Nepali: उपेन्द्र मान सिंह; born 1973) is a Nepalese former footballer who played as a goalkeeper. He represented the Nepal national football team, and also played for the Indian NFL club Salgaocar. He is also a former captain of the national team.

== Career statistics ==
=== International ===
Appearances and goals by national team and year
National team	Year	Apps	Goals
Nepal	1993	2	0
Nepal	1994	–	
Nepal	1995	3	0
Nepal	1996	–	
Nepal	1997	5	0
Nepal	1998	1	0
Nepal	1999	6	0
Nepal	2000	3	0
Nepal	2001	6	0
Nepal	2002	–	
Nepal	2003	8	0
Total		34	0
