= 2010 FIFA World Cup qualification – AFC second round =

This page provides the summaries of the AFC second round matches for the 2010 FIFA World Cup qualification.

== Format ==
Among the 19 winners of the first round, the 11 highest ranked teams (according to the first round seeding) received a bye and advanced to the third round of the Asian qualifiers (along with the five teams directly seeded to the third round). The eight remaining first round winners played in this round. Those ranked 16–19 were randomly drawn against teams ranked 12–15, and the draw (which allocated positions in the draw by seeding only) took place on 6 August 2007 in the AFC House in Kuala Lumpur, Malaysia.

== Matches ==
Team 1	Agg.	Team 2	1st leg	2nd leg
Hong Kong	0–3	Turkmenistan	0–0	0–3
Indonesia	1–11	Syria	1–4	0–7
Singapore	3–1	Tajikistan	2–0	1–1
Yemen	1–2	Thailand	1–1	0–1

10 November 2007
14:00 UTC+8

Hong Kong	0–0	Turkmenistan
	Report

Hong Kong Stadium, Hong Kong
Attendance: 2,823
Referee: Salem Mujghef (Jordan)
18 November 2007
18:00 UTC+5

Turkmenistan	3–0	Hong Kong
Nasyrov 42'; Bayramov 53'; Mirzoyev 80'	Report

Olympic Stadium (Saparmurat), Ashgabat
Attendance: 30,000
Referee: Abdullah Al Hilali (Oman)

Turkmenistan won 3–0 on aggregate.

9 November 2007
19:30 UTC+7

Indonesia	1–4	Syria
Budi 39'	Report	Esmaeel 17'; Al Zeno 34'; Chaabo 43'; Rafe 90+3'

Gelora Bung Karno Stadium, Jakarta
Attendance: 35,000
Referee: Mohsen Torky (Iran)
18 November 2007
14:00 UTC+2

Syria	7–0	Indonesia
Chaabo 40', 44', 87'; Rafe 60', 72', 90'; Al Hussain 81' (pen.)	Report

Abbasiyyin Stadium, Damascus
Attendance: 5,000
Referee: Sun Baojie (China)

Syria won 11–1 on aggregate.

9 November 2007
19:30 UTC+8

Singapore	2–0	Tajikistan
Đurić 23', 44'	Report

National Stadium, Singapore
Attendance: 6,606
Referee: Kwon Jong Chul (South Korea)
18 November 2007
13:00 UTC+5

Tajikistan	1–1	Singapore
Ismailov 2'	Report	Alam Shah 25'

Central Stadium, Dushanbe
Attendance: 21,500
Referee: Mark Shield (Australia)

Singapore won 3–1 on aggregate.

9 November 2007
16:15 UTC+3

Yemen	1–1	Thailand
Al Nono 43'	Report	Chaikamdee 35'

Ali Muhsin Al-Muriasi Stadium, Sana'a
Attendance: 12,000
Referee: Khalil Al Ghamdi (Saudi Arabia)
18 November 2007
17:00 UTC+7

Thailand	1–0	Yemen
Chaikamdee 16'	Report

Suphachalasai Stadium, Bangkok
Attendance: 29,000
Referee: Kazuhiko Matsumura (Japan)

Thailand won 2–1 on aggregate.

== Goalscorers ==
There were 22 goals scored in 8 matches, for an average of 2.75 goals per match.

4 goals

- (Syria) Zyad Chaabo
- (Syria) Raja Rafe

2 goals

- (Singapore) Aleksandar Đurić
- (Thailand) Sarayoot Chaikamdee

1 goal

- (Indonesia) Budi Sudarsono
- (Singapore) Noh Alam Shah
- (Syria) Feras Esmaeel
- (Syria) Mohamed Al Zeno
- (Syria) Jehad Al Hussain
- (Tajikistan) Jamshed Ismailov
- (Turkmenistan) Mekan Nasyrow
- (Turkmenistan) Wladimir Baýramow
- (Turkmenistan) Arif Mirzoyev
- (Yemen) Ali Al Nono
