= Yuttapong Boonamporn =

Thai footballer (born 1976)

Personal information
- Full name: Yuttapong Boonamporn
- Date of birth: November 21, 1976 (age 49)
- Place of birth: Suphanburi, Thailand
- Height: 1.76 m (5 ft 9 1/2 in)
- Positions: Defensive midfielder; defender

Youth career
- Sinthana

Senior career*
Years	Team	Apps	(Gls)
1998–2004	Sinthana	89	(2)
2005–2006	Da My Nghe	33	(0)
2007	Tobacco Monopoly	28	(1)
2008	Provincial Electricity Authority	17	(0)
2009–2010	Suphanburi	1	(0)
- * Club domestic league appearances and goals as of 11 October 2008

Yuttapong Boonamporn (born November 21, 1976) is a Thai footballer. He won the Thai Premier League title in 2008 with Provincial Electricity Authority.

He played for the Thai national team at the 1998 Asian Games.

== Honours ==
- Thailand Premier League 1998 -Sinthana FC
- Thailand Premier League 2008 -PEA FC
