= Mansur Hakimov =

Tajikistani footballer

Personal information
- Full name: Mansur Hakimov
- Date of birth: 30 August 1977 (age 49)
- Place of birth: Tajik SSR, Soviet Union
- Position: Forward

Senior career*
Years	Team	Apps	(Gls)
1999–2000	Khujand		
2001	Metallurg Bekabad	13	(1)
2004–2005	Parvoz Bobojon Ghafurov		
2006–2007	Regar-TadAZ		
2008	Khujand		
2009	Regar-TadAZ		

International career^{‡}
2004	Tajikistan	2	(1)
- * Club domestic league appearances and goals as of 13:49, 6 December 2017 (UTC) ‡ National team caps and goals as of 6 December 2017

Mansur Hakimov (born 30 August 1977) is a retired Tajikistani footballer who played as a forward.

== Career statistics ==
=== International ===
Tajikistan national team
Year	Apps	Goals
2004	2	1
Total	2	1

Statistics accurate as of 17 November 2004

=== International goals ===
As of 13 October 2004

#	Date	Venue	Opponent	Score	Result	Competition
1	13 October 2004	Pamir Stadium, Dushanbe, Tajikistan	Kyrgyzstan	2–0	2–1	2006 FIFA World Cup qualification

== Honours ==
Parvoz Bobojon Ghafurov

- Tajik Cup (1): 2004

Regar-TadAZ

- Tajik League (2): 2006, 2007
- Tajik Cup (1): 2006

Khujand

- Tajik Cup (1): 2008
