= Aleksey Negmatov =

Tajikistani footballer

Personal information
- Date of birth: 4 January 1986 (age 40)
- Place of birth: Soviet Union
- Height: 1.72 m (5 ft 7 1/2 in)
- Position: Defender

Team information
- Current team: Daleron-Uroteppa

Senior career*
Years	Team	Apps	(Gls)
2006–2012	Vakhsh Qurghonteppa		
2012–2013	Regar-TadAZ		
2014–	Daleron-Uroteppa		

International career^{‡}
2004–2013	Tajikistan	18	(1)
- * Club domestic league appearances and goals as of 22 October 2015 ‡ National team caps and goals as of 22 October 2015

Aleksey Negmatov (Tajik: Алексей Негматов; born on 4 January 1986) is a Tajikistani footballer who plays as a defender for FC Vakhsh and the Tajikistan national football team.

== Career statistics ==
=== International ===
Tajikistan national team
Year	Apps	Goals
2004	3	0
2005	0	0
2006	7	0
2007	1	0
2008	0	0
2009	0	0
2010	0	0
2011	0	0
2012	5	1
2013	2	0
Total	18	1

Statistics accurate as of match played 11 October 2011

=== International goals ===
As of 22 October 2015

#	Date	Venue	Opponent	Score	Result	Competition
1	13 March 2012	Dasarath Rangasala Stadium, Kathmandu	Philippines	1–0	1–2	2012 AFC Challenge Cup

== Honours ==
Vakhsh Qurghonteppa

- Tajik League (1): 2009

Regar-TadAZ

- Tajik Cup (1): 2012

Tajikistan

- AFC Challenge Cup (1): 2006
