= Vyacheslav Knyazev =

Tajikistani footballer

Personal information
- Full name: Vyacheslav Knyazev
- Date of birth: 22 May 1974 (age 52)
- Position: Defender

Senior career*
| Years | Team | Apps | (Gls) |
| 1993–1994 | Pamir Dushanbe | | |
| 1997 | Neftchi Farg'ona | 22 | (5) |
| 1999 | Varzob Dushanbe | | |
| 2000 | Neftchi Farg'ona | 10 | (1) |
| 2001 | Zhetysu | 11 | (0) |

International career^{‡}
| 1993–1999 | Tajikistan | 13 | (3) |
- * Club domestic league appearances and goals as of 14 October 2015 ‡ National team caps and goals as of 14 October 2015

Vyacheslav Knyazev (born 22 May 1974) is a retired Tajikistani footballer who played for the Tajikistan national football team.

== Career statistics ==
=== International ===
Tajikistan national team
| Year | Apps | Goals |
|---|---|---|
| 1997 | 3 | 0 |
| 1994 | 1 | 0 |
| 1995 | 0 | 0 |
| 1996 | 0 | 0 |
| 1997 | 6 | 2 |
| 1998 | 0 | 0 |
| 1999 | 3 | 1 |
| Total | 13 | 3 |

=== International Goals ===
| # | Date | Venue | Opponent | Score | Result | Competition |
|---|---|---|---|---|---|---|
| 1. | 25 May 1997 | Nisa-Çandybil Stadium, Ashgabat, Turkmenistan | Turkmenistan | 1–1 | 2–1 | 1998 World Cup Qualifier |
| 2. | 25 May 1997 | Nisa-Çandybil Stadium, Ashgabat, Turkmenistan | Turkmenistan | 2–1 | 2–1 | 1998 World Cup Qualifier |
| 3. | 7 August 1999 | Central Stadium, Dushanbe, Tajikistan | Oman | 1–0 | 2–1 | 2000 AFC Asian Cup Qualifier |

== Honours ==
Varzob Dushanbe

- Tajik League (1): 2006
- Tajik Cup (1): 1999
