= K. V. Dhanesh =

Indian footballer

Personal information
- Full name: Kooloth Valappil Dhanesh
- Date of birth: 13 February 1973 (age 53)
- Place of birth: Kerala, India
- Position: Defender

Senior career*
| Years | Team | Apps | (Gls) |
- JCT Phagwara
- East Bengal
- FC Kochin

International career
- India
- * Club domestic league appearances and goals

Kooloth Valappil Dhanesh (born 13 February 1973) is a former Indian International football player who played as a defender. Born in Kerala, he started his career at the age of 19 in 1994 and later captained the national side at the 2002 FIFA World Cup qualifiers. He has played for the clubs like JCT Phagwara, East Bengal and FC Kochin. Dhanesh was temporarily suspended from the Cannanore District Football Association for manhandling a referee in a local match in 2013.

== Honours ==
India

- SAFF Championship: 1997; runner-up: 1995
- South Asian Games Gold medal: 1995; Bronze medal: 1999
