= Umed Alidodov =

Tajikistani international footballer (born 1970)

Personal information
- Full name: Umed Bahshidodovich Alidodov
- Date of birth: 16 November 1970 (age 55)
- Place of birth: Dushanbe, Tajik SSR
- Height: 1.80 m (5 ft 11 in)
- Position: Midfielder

Youth career
- –1988: Pamir Dushanbe

Senior career*
| Years | Team | Apps | (Gls) |
| 1989–1990 | Vakhsh Qurghonteppa | 66 | (3) |
| 1991–1992 | Pamir Dushanbe | | (11) |
| 1993 | Okean Nakhodka | 0 | (0) |
| 1993–1994 | Avangard-Kortek | 56 | (3) |
| 1996 | Neftekhimik Nizhnekamsk | 14 | (1) |
| 1996–1997 | Amkar Perm | 40 | (5) |
| 1998 | Tomiris | | |
| 2000–2001 | Varzob Dushanbe | | |
| 2001–2002 | Esil | 23 | (2) |
| 2002 | Regar-TadAZ | | |
| 2003 | BDA Dushanbe | | |
- Danghara
| 2004 | Hima Dushanbe | | |
| Total | | 199+ | (12) |

International career
| 1992–1997 | Tajikistan | 10 | (2) |
- * Club domestic league appearances and goals

Umed Bahshidodovich Alidodov (Tajik: Умед Бахшидодович Алидодов, Russian: Уме́д Бахшидо́дович Алидо́дов; born 16 November 1970) is a Tajikistani retired international footballer who played as a midfielder.

== Personal life ==
Alidodov resides in Dubai, United Arab Emirates, where he played for the club "Rustar" (for Russian-speaking residents) in an amateur league. His daughter, Yasmina Alidodova (born 2003), is an aspiring singer, model and actress.

== Career statistics ==
=== International ===
Tajikistan national team
| Year | Apps | Goals |
|---|---|---|
| 1992 | 2 | 0 |
| 1993 | 0 | 0 |
| 1994 | 0 | 0 |
| 1995 | 0 | 0 |
| 1996 | 2 | 0 |
| 1997 | 6 | 2 |
| Total | 10 | 2 |

International goals
| # | Date | Venue | Opponent | Score | Result | Competition |
|---|---|---|---|---|---|---|
| 1. | 4 May 1997 | Pamir Stadium, Dushanbe, Tajikistan | Vietnam | 1–0 | 4–0 | 1998 FIFA World Cup qualification |
| 2. | 1 June 1997 | Thống Nhất Stadium, Ho Chi Minh City, Vietnam | Vietnam | 2–0 | 4–0 | 1998 FIFA World Cup qualification |

== Honours ==
Pamir Dushanbe

- Tajik League (1): 1992
- Tajik Cup (1): 1992

Varzob Dushanbe

- Tajik League (1): 2000

Regar-TadAZ

- Tajik League (1): 2002

Tomiris

- Kazakhstan First Division (1): 1998
