= Naser Al-Othman =

Kuwaiti footballer

Personal information
- Full name: Naser Al-Othman
- Date of birth: 14 January 1977 (age 49)
- Place of birth: Kuwait
- Height: 1.63 m (5 ft 4 in)
- Position: Defender

Senior career*
Years	Team	Apps	(Gls)
1996–2016	Al-Salmiya		
2007–2008	→ Al-Tadamon (loan)		
2016–2017	Burgan		

International career
1998–2005	Kuwait	27	(0)
- * Club domestic league appearances and goals

Naser Al-Othman (born 14 January 1977) is a Kuwaiti footballer. He competed in the 2000 Summer Olympics.
