= Denis Kulbayev =

Tajikistani footballer

Personal information
- Full name: Denis Kulbayev
- Date of birth: 9 February 1975 (age 51)
- Position: Forward

Senior career*
Years	Team	Apps	(Gls)
1996	Dynamo Dushanbe	25	(10)
1998	Surxon Termiz	6	(0)
1999	Varzob Dushanbe		
2000	Panjshir		
2000	Surxon Termiz	3	(0)

International career^{‡}
1999	Tajikistan	1	(1)
- * Club domestic league appearances and goals as of 24 December 2017 ‡ National team caps and goals as of 24 December 2017

Denis Kulbayev (born 9 February 1975) is a retired Tajikistani footballer who played for the Tajikistan national football team.

== Career statistics ==
=== International ===
Tajikistan national team
Year	Apps	Goals
1999	1	1
Total	1	1

=== International Goals ===
#	Date	Venue	Opponent	Score	Result	Competition
1.	7 August 1999	Central Stadium, Dushanbe, Tajikistan	Oman	2–0	2–1	2000 AFC Asian Cup Qualifier

== Honours ==
Dynamo Dushanbe

- Tajik League (1): 1996

Varzob Dushanbe

- Tajik League (1): 1999
- Tajik Cup (1): 1999
