= Jiju Jacob =

Indian footballer

Personal information
- Full name: Jiju Jacob
- Date of birth: 25 December 1967 (age 58)
- Place of birth: Kozhikode, Kerala, India
- Position: Defender

Senior career*
Years	Team	Apps	(Gls)
- State Bank of Travancore

International career
- India
- * Club domestic league appearances and goals

Jiju Jacob (born 25 December 1967) is a former Indian International football player who played as a defender. Jiju is from Kozhikode, Kerala and has represented India in several matches including the Nehru Cup in 1997 and the 1998 Bangkok Asian Games. He currently works as a Malayalam co-commentator and pundit on Star Sports network.

== Honours ==
India

- SAFF Championship: 1993; runner-up: 1995
- South Asian Games Silver medal: 1993
