= Rustam Zabirov =

Uzbek-Tajik footballer

Personal information
- Full name: Rustam Zairovich Zabirov
- Date of birth: 23 October 1966 (age 60)
- Height: 1.75 m (5 ft 9 in)
- Position: Forward

Senior career*
Years	Team	Apps	(Gls)
1987–1988	Vakhsh Qurghonteppa	54	(23)
1989–1991	Pamir Dushanbe	38	(3)
1991–1992	Navbahor Namangan	65	(34)
1992–1993	SV Meppen	10	(0)
1993–1994	SG Betzdorf	?	(?)
1995	Shinnik Yaroslav	8	(0)
1995	Navbahor Namangan	14	(1)
1996–1997	Rubin Kazan	56	(15)
1997–1998	Zarafshon Navoi	40	(19)
2000	Sogdiana Jizzakh	10	(2)
2000–2001	Vasco S.C.	?	(1)

International career
1992	Uzbekistan	2	(1)
1998	Tajikistan	1	(1)

Managerial career
- 2005: Navbahor Namangan
- 2008–2010: Qizilqum Zarafshon
- 2013: FK Andijan (assistant coach)
- 2013: Qizilqum Zarafshon
- * Club domestic league appearances and goals

Rustam Zairovich Zabirov (Russian: Рустам Заирович Забиров; born 23 October 1966) is an Uzbek-Tajik football manager and former football player and coach. He played for Pamir Dushanbe, Navbahor Namangan, Rubin Kazan and other clubs.

== Club career ==
In 1991, he moved from Pamir Dushanbe to Navbahor Namangan. In 1991 season he played 35 matches for Navbahor in Soviet First League, scoring 19 goals. One year later, in first season of Uzbek League, Zabirov completed 30 matches and scored 15 goals, becoming the best season top scorer of club.

In 1992, he moved to SV Meppen to play in 2.Bundesliga. In 1992-1993 season he played 10 matches for SV Meppen. From 1996 to 1997 he played for Rubin Kazan.

Zabirov later signed for National Football League (India) side Vasco SC in 2000. He has also made several appearances for Goa Professional League. With Vasco, he played more than ten matches in the 5th National Football League (2000/01) until September 2021.

He retired form professional football on 1 July 2002.

== International career ==
Zabirov represented both Uzbekistan and Tajikistan at international level.

== Managerial career ==
From 2008 to 2010 he was head coach of Qizilqum Zarafshon. On 27 August 2010 he resigned his post, after Qizilqum lost in away match against Olmaliq FK.

In January 2013 he started to work as assistant coach to Azamat Abduraimov at FK Andijan. On 5 April 2013 he was appointed as head coach of Qizilqum Zarafshon again, after Ravshan Khaydarov resigned his post. On 23 July 2013 he was sacked from his post and left the club.

== Career statistics ==
=== International ===
As of match played 8 December 1998

National team	Year	Apps	Goals
Uzbekistan
Uzbekistan	1992	2	1
Total		1	2
Tajikistan
Tajikistan	1998	1	1
Total		1	1

=== International goals ===
As of goal scored on 8 December 1998
Scores and results list Tajikistan's goal tally first, score column indicates score after each Tajikistan goal.

List of international goals scored by Rustam Zabirov for Tajikistan
No.	Date	Venue	Opponent	Score	Result	Competition	Ref.
1	8 December 1998	National Stadium, Bangkok, Thailand	China	1–1	1–3	Friendly	

== Honours ==
Navbahor

- Uzbek Cup: 1992, 1995
