= Jamshed Ismailov =

Tajikistani footballer

Personal information
- Full name: Jamshed Ismailov
- Date of birth: 12 January 1987 (age 39)
- Place of birth: Dushanbe, Tajikistan
- Position: Midfielder

Senior career*
Years	Team	Apps	(Gls)
2006	Regar-TadAZ		
2007	Dynamo Dushanbe		
2008–2011	Regar-TadAZ		
2011	Khayr Vahdat		
2012–2013	Regar-TadAZ		
2014–2016	Khayr Vahdat		

International career^{‡}
2007–2013	Tajikistan	11	(3)
- * Club domestic league appearances and goals as of 13 September 2017 ‡ National team caps and goals as of 13 September 2017

Jamshed Ismailov (born 12 January 1987) is a Tajikistani footballer who currently plays for Regar-TadAZ Tursunzoda. He is a member of the Tajikistan national football team in the 2010 FIFA World Cup qualification campaign.

== Career statistics ==
=== International ===
Tajikistan national team
Year	Apps	Goals
2007	3	1
2008	0	0
2009	0	0
2010	1	0
2011	3	0
2012	2	0
2013	2	2
Total	11	3

Statistics accurate as of match played 4 June 2013

=== International goals ===
As of 22 October 2015

#	Date	Venue	Opponent	Score	Result	Competition
1.	18 November 2007	Central Republican Stadium, Dushanbe, Tajikistan	Singapore	1–0	1–1	2010 FIFA World Cup qualification
2.	17 November 2010	Spartak Stadium, Bishkek, Kyrgyzstan	Macau	1–0	3–0	2014 AFC Challenge Cup qualification
3.	17 November 2010	Spartak Stadium, Bishkek, Kyrgyzstan	Macau	3–0	3–0	2014 AFC Challenge Cup qualification

== Honours ==
Regar-TadAZ

- Tajik League (2): 2006, 2008
- Tajik Cup (3): 2006, 2011, 2012
- Tajik Supercup (3): 2011, 2012, 2013
- AFC President's Cup (2): 2008, 2009
