= Dmitry Saltsman =

Tajikistani footballer

Personal information
- Full name: Dmitry Georgievich Saltsman
- Date of birth: 1 November 1974 (age 51)
- Height: 1.82 m (6 ft 0 in)
- Position: Midfielder

Senior career*
Years	Team	Apps	(Gls)
1991	Vakhsh Kurgan-Tyube	16	(1)
1992	Vakhsh Qurghonteppa		
1993	Gigant Voskresensk	25	(2)
1994	Avangard-Kortek Kolomna	32	(1)
1995–1996	Mashinostroitel Pskov		
1997	Energia Velikiye Luki	31	(4)
1998	Zenit-2 Saint Petersburg	25	(2)
1999	Dynamo Saint Petersburg	31	(0)
2000–2005	Severstal Cherepovets	182	(7)

International career^{‡}
1998	Tajikistan	1	(1)
- * Club domestic league appearances and goals as of 29 March 2021 ‡ National team caps and goals as of 29 March 2021

Dmitry Georgievich Saltsman (Russian: Дмитрий Георгиевич Сальцман; born on 1 November 1974) is a retired Tajikistani footballer.

== Career statistics ==
=== Club ===
As of match played 22 November 2015

Club	Season	League			National Cup		Continental		Other		Total	
Club	Season	Division	Apps	Goals	Apps	Goals	Apps	Goals	Apps	Goals	Apps	Goals
Severstal Cherepovets	2000	Russian Second Division	34	5	1	0	–		–		35	5
Severstal Cherepovets	2001	Russian Second Division	31	1	2	0	–		–		33	1
Severstal Cherepovets	2002	Russian Second Division	31	0	2	1	–		–		33	1
Severstal Cherepovets	2003	Russian Second Division	30	0	4	0	–		–		34	0
Severstal Cherepovets	2004	Russian Second Division	25	0	1	0	–		–		26	0
Severstal Cherepovets	2005	Russian Second Division	28	1	1	0	–		–		29	1
Severstal Cherepovets	Total		182	7	11	1	-	-	-	-	193	8
Career total			182	7	11	1	-	-	-	-	193	8

=== International ===
Tajikistan national team
Year	Apps	Goals
1998	1	1
Total	1	1

Statistics accurate as of match played 1 December 1998

=== International goals ===
Scores and results list Tajikistan's goal tally first.

#	Date	Venue	Opponent	Score	Result	Competition	Ref.
1.	1 December 1998	Suphan Buri Provincial Stadium, Suphan Buri, Thailand	Maldives	3-0	3-0	1998 Asian Games - Group D	
