= Zakir Berdikulov =

Tajikistani footballer

Personal information
- Full name: Zakir Berdikulov
- Date of birth: 28 May 1972 (age 54)
- Place of birth: Soviet Union
- Height: 1.78 m (5 ft 10 in)
- Position: Midfielder

Senior career*
Years	Team	Apps	(Gls)
1995	Istaravshan		
1996–1997	Yangiyer	58	(22)
1998–1999	Neftchi Fargʻona	48	(9)
2000	Guliston	27	(9)
2001–2002	Zarafshon Navoi	46	(14)
2002	Mash'al Mubarek	15	(2)
2003	Nasaf	13	(1)
2004	Qizilqum Zarafshon	14	(2)
2005	Sogdiana Jizzakh	21	(3)
2007	Parvoz Bobojon Ghafurov		
2009–2010	Khujand		
2011–2012	Istaravshan		

International career^{‡}
2000	Tajikistan	2	(2)
- * Club domestic league appearances and goals as of 5 January 2016 ‡ National team caps and goals as of 5 January 2016

Zakir Berdikulov (born 28 May 1972) is a retired Tajikistani footballer.

== Career statistics ==
=== International ===
Tajikistan national team
Year	Apps	Goals
2000	2	2
Total	2	2

Statistics accurate as of match played 28 November 2000

=== International goals ===
As of match played 26 November 2000

#	Date	Venue	Opponent	Score	Result	Competition
1	26 November 2000	Takhti Stadium, Tabriz, Iran	Guam	10–0	16–0	2002 World Cup qualification
2	26 November 2000	Takhti Stadium, Tabriz, Iran	Guam	11–0	16–0	2002 World Cup qualification

== Honours ==
Parvoz Bobojon Ghafurov

- Tajik Cup (1): 2007
