= 2016 FC Istiklol season =

FC Istiklol
2016 season
- President: Shohruh Saidov
- Manager: Mubin Ergashev (until 10 July 2016); Nikola Lazarevic (from 13 July 2016)
- Stadium: Republican Stadium
- Tajik League: 1st
- Tajik Cup: Champions
- Tajik Supercup: Champions
- AFC Cup: Group Stage
- Top goalscorer: League: Manuchekhr Dzhalilov (22); All: Manuchekhr Dzhalilov (30)

The FC Istiklol 2016 season is Istiklol's eighth Tajik League season. They are the current defending Champions in the Tajik League, Tajik Cup and Tajik Supercup having completed a Domestic Treble during the 2015 season. They will also participate in the AFC Cup for the second time, entering at the group stage.

== Season events ==
On 10 July 2016, Istiklol fired their entire coaching staff, including manager Mubin Ergashev, appointing Serbian Nikola Lazarevic as his replacement on 13 July 2016. On 31 October 2016, days after winning their fifth Tajik League title, Istiklol appointed Mukhsin Mukhamadiev as their new manager for the 2017 season.

== Squad ==
As of match played 5 November 2016

No.	Name	Nationality	Position	Date of birth (age)	Signed from	Signed in	Contract ends	Apps.	Goals
Goalkeepers
1	Nikola Stošić	(Serbia)	GK	15 March 1994 (aged 22)	Železničar Beograd	2013		61	0
30	Emomali Soniev	(Tajikistan)	GK	7 November 1996 (aged 19)	Youth Team	2013		1	0
35	Kurban Boboev	(Tajikistan)	GK	3 August 1987 (aged 29)	Istaravshan	2015		9	0
Defenders
2	Siyovush Asrorov	(Tajikistan)	DF	21 July 1992 (aged 24)	Khujand	2013		78	8
3	Tabrezi Davlatmir	(Tajikistan)	DF	6 June 1998 (aged 18)	Youth Team	2016		5	0
5	Alisher Safarov	(Tajikistan)	DF	24 June 1998 (aged 18)	Youth Team	2014		7	0
15	Petro Kovalchuk	(Ukraine)	DF	28 May 1984 (aged 32)	Slutsk	2015		65	1
19	Akhtam Nazarov	(Tajikistan)	DF	29 September 1992 (aged 24)	Energetik Dushanbe	2013		94	7
Midfielders
4	David Mawutor	(Ghana)	MF	12 April 1992 (aged 24)		2016		40	10
13	Nozim Babadjanov	(Tajikistan)	MF	7 August 1995 (aged 21)	Regar-TadAZ	2016		28	8
14	Faridoon Sharipov	(Tajikistan)	MF	8 September 1994 (aged 22)	Regar-TadAZ	2016		28	2
18	Fatkhullo Fatkhuloev	(Tajikistan)	MF	24 March 1990 (aged 26)	Dynamo Dushanbe	2008			
20	Amirbek Juraboev	(Tajikistan)	MF	13 April 1996 (aged 20)	Barki Tajik	2016		15	1
23	Ehson Panjshanbe	(Tajikistan)	MF	12 May 1999 (aged 17)	Youth Team	2016		7	1
24	Oyatullo Safarov	(Tajikistan)	MF	19 December 2000 (aged 15)	Youth Team	2016		3	0
Forwards
9	Jahongir Aliev	(Tajikistan)	FW	14 July 1996 (aged 20)	Khujand	2016		22	8
12	Amirdzhon Safarov	(Tajikistan)	FW	18 February 1995 (aged 21)	Youth Team	2015		6	1
17	Dilshod Vasiev	(Tajikistan)	FW	12 February 1988 (aged 28)	Energetik Dushanbe	2009			
21	Suhrob Jalilov	(Tajikistan)	FW		Youth Team	2016		9	0
22	Sheriddin Boboev	(Tajikistan)	FW	21 April 1999 (aged 17)	Youth Team	2015		9	4
63	Manuchekhr Dzhalilov	(Tajikistan)	FW	27 September 1990 (aged 26)	Neftekhimik Nizhnekamsk	2015		60	61
Out on loan
6	Sokhib Suvonkulov	(Tajikistan)	DF	15 September 1988 (aged 28)	Vakhsh Qurghonteppa	2009			
21	Romish Jalilov	(Tajikistan)	MF	21 November 1995 (aged 20)	Youth Team	2012			
20	Ziёvuddin Fuzaylov	(Tajikistan)	DF	7 March 2000 (aged 16)	Youth Team	2015		21	5
Left during the season
5	Jakhongir Jalilov	(Tajikistan)	MF	28 September 1989 (aged 27)	Youth Team	2009			
9	Mehdi Chahjouyi	(Iran)	DF	22 July 1989 (aged 27)	Shahrdari Bandar Abbas	2015		35	2
7	Parvizdzhon Umarbayev	(Tajikistan)	MF	1 November 1994 (aged 22)	Khimik Dzerzhinsk	2015		44	8
8	Nuriddin Davronov	(Tajikistan)	MF	16 January 1991 (aged 25)	Sloboda Užice	2013			
9	Oleksandr Kablash	(Ukraine)	FW	5 September 1989 (aged 27)	Nasaf	2016		9	4
10	Akmal Kholmatov	(Tajikistan)	MF	4 April 1976 (aged 40)	Neftchi Fargʻona	2016		10	2
26	Davron Erghashev	(Tajikistan)	DF	19 March 1988 (aged 28)	Zhetysu	2016			

=== Out on loan ===
Note: Flags indicate national team as defined under FIFA eligibility rules; some limited exceptions apply. Players may hold more than one non-FIFA nationality.

No.	Pos.	Nation	Player
6	DF	TJK	Sokhib Suvonkulov (at Barki Tajik)
21	MF	TJK	Romish Jalilov (at Regar-TadAZ)

No.	Pos.	Nation	Player
—	DF	TJK	Ziёvuddin Fuzaylov (at Barki Tajik)

== Transfers ==
=== Winter ===
In: Note: Flags indicate national team as defined under FIFA eligibility rules; some limited exceptions apply. Players may hold more than one non-FIFA nationality.

No.	Pos.	Nation	Player
9	FW	TJK	Jahongir Aliev (from (Tajikistan) Khujand)
10	FW	UKR	Oleksandr Kablash
11	MF	TJK	Akmal Kholmatov (from (Uzbekistan) Neftchi Fargʻona)
13	MF	TJK	Nozim Babadjanov (from (Tajikistan) Regar-TadAZ)
14	MF	TJK	Faridoon Sharipov (from (Tajikistan) Regar-TadAZ)
16	GK	TJK	Emomali Soniev (loan return from (Tajikistan) Barki Tajik)
26	DF	TJK	Davron Ergashev (from (Kazakhstan) Zhetysu)
—	GK	TJK	Alisher Dodov (trial)
—	DF	RUS	Azamat Doguzov (trial)

Out: Note: Flags indicate national team as defined under FIFA eligibility rules; some limited exceptions apply. Players may hold more than one non-FIFA nationality.

No.	Pos.	Nation	Player
4	DF	TJK	Eraj Rajabov (to (Tajikistan) Khujand)
6	DF	ESP	José Ballester
7	MF	TJK	Umedzhon Sharipov (to (Tajikistan) Vakhsh Qurghonteppa)
9	MF	TJK	Khurshed Makhmudov (to (Tajikistan) Barki Tajik)
10	FW	ESP	Manuel Bleda (to (Romania) Ceahlăul Piatra Neamț)
16	GK	TJK	Alisher Tuychiev (to (Tajikistan) Khujand)
21	MF	TJK	Romish Jalilov (loan to (Tajikistan) Regar-TadAZ)
—	FW	TJK	Jahongir Ergashev (to (Belarus) Dinamo Brest)

=== Summer ===
In: Note: Flags indicate national team as defined under FIFA eligibility rules; some limited exceptions apply. Players may hold more than one non-FIFA nationality.

No.	Pos.	Nation	Player
3	DF	TJK	Tabrezi Davlatmir (loan return from (Tajikistan) Barki Tajik)
4	MF	GHA	David Mawutor
20	MF	TJK	Amirbek Juraboev (from (Tajikistan) Barki Tajik)
23	MF	TJK	Ehson Panjshanbe (loan return from (Tajikistan) Barki Tajik)

Out: Note: Flags indicate national team as defined under FIFA eligibility rules; some limited exceptions apply. Players may hold more than one non-FIFA nationality.

No.	Pos.	Nation	Player
5	DF	TJK	Jakhongir Jalilov (Retired)
6	DF	IRI	Mehdi Chahjouyi
7	MF	TJK	Parvizdzhon Umarbayev (to (Bulgaria) Lokomotiv Plovdiv)
8	MF	TJK	Nuriddin Davronov (to (Bulgaria) Dunav Ruse)
10	FW	UKR	Oleksandr Kablash (to (Moldova) Dacia Chișinău)
11	MF	TJK	Akmal Kholmatov (to (Uzbekistan) Neftchi Fargʻona)
26	DF	TJK	Davron Ergashev (to (Kazakhstan) Taraz)
—	DF	TJK	Sokhib Suvonkulov (to (Tajikistan) Barki Tajik)
—	DF	TJK	Ziёvuddin Fuzaylov (loan to (Tajikistan) Barki Tajik)

== Friendlies ==
7 January 2015	Istiklol	1–2	Tajikistan U-22	Dushanbe
15:00 (UTC+5)	R.Nagaev 20'; Jalilov (yellow card) (yellow-red card) 75'; Davronov (yellow card)	Summary	J.Aliyev 25'; F.Rakhmatov 80'; F.Karaev (yellow card)	Stadium: Pamir Stadium; Attendance: 500; Referee: Sayod Zayniddinov

12 January 2015	Istiklol	1–1	Khujand	Kayrakkum
15:00 (UTC+5)	Dzhalilov 76'; K.Boboev (yellow card); Babadjanov (yellow card)	Summary	Tokhirov 17' (pen.); M.Marifboev (yellow card)	Stadium: National Bank Stadium; Attendance: 200; Referee: Hurshed Dadaboev

15 January 2015	Istiklol	2–2	Khujand	Kayrakkum
15:00 (UTC+5)	Kablash 61'; Am.Safarov 85'	Summary	Tokhirov 62', 76'; I.Barotov (yellow card)	Stadium: National Bank Stadium; Attendance: 300; Referee: Hurshed Dadaboev

19 January 2015	Istiklol	1–1	Olmaliq	Tashkent
15:00 (UTC+5)	Kablash 18'; Kovalchuk (red card) 45+1'	Summary	I.Isokzhonov 55'	Stadium: Chirchiq Stadium; Attendance: 72; Referee: Viktor Serazitdinov

22 January 2015	Istiklol	0–1	Neftchi Fargʻona	Tashkent
15:00 (UTC+5)		Summary	M.Bobojonov 28'	Stadium: Chirchiq Stadium; Attendance: 100; Referee: Bakhtiyor Namozov

29 January 2015	Istiklol	1–1	Khujand	Dushanbe
15:00 (UTC+5)	Umarbayev 32'; Davronov (yellow card) 74'	Summary	Tukhtasunov (yellow card) 40'; M.Marifboev 72' (yellow card) 74'	Stadium: Pamir Stadium

3 February 2015	Istiklol (Tajikistan)	1–3	(Hungary) Várda	Antalya, Turkey
18:00 (UTC+5)	Kholmatov 13'	Summary	Erős 51'; Kulcsár 75'; Délczeg 87'	Stadium: Mardan Palace

6 February 2015	Istiklol (Tajikistan)	2–2	(Kazakhstan) Taraz	Antalya, Turkey
(UTC+5)	Nazarov 7' (pen.); Dzhalilov 56' (red card) 82'; Fatkhuloev (red card) 88'	Istiklol Report	19'; 85'

9 February 2015	Istiklol (Tajikistan)	4–0	(Germany) SV RW Türkgücü Wittlich	Antalya, Turkey
(UTC+5)	Dzhalilov 23', 62', 67'; Vasiev 87'; Davronov (yellow card); Ergashev (yellow card)	Report

12 February 2015	Istiklol (Tajikistan)	2–2	(Kazakhstan) Shakhter Karagandy	Antalya, Turkey
(UTC+5)	Nazarov 42'; Kholmatov 75'; Davronov (yellow card); Umarbayev (yellow card)	Summary	Copete 34'; R.Kenetaev 65'

25 May 2016	Somon Dangara	2–3	Istiklol	Dushanbe
(UTC+5)	S.Saidov 36'; H.Khalilov 89' (pen.)	Summary	S.Boboev 14', 51'; S.Sharipov 83' (o.g.); Nazarov (yellow card)	Stadium: Pamir Stadium; Attendance: 7,000; Referee: Khusrawi Siddikzod

26 June 2016	Istiklol (Tajikistan)	1–2	(Russia) Lokomotiv Moscow	Dushanbe
21:00 (UTC+5)	Mawutor 51'	Summary	Miranchuk 31'; Škuletić 90'; Kolomeytsev (yellow card)	Stadium: Pamir Stadium; Attendance: 11,000; Referee: Bahrom Sadulloev

27 December 2016	Istiklol	2–2	Khosilot Farkhor	Dushanbe
(UTC+5)	Babadjanov 12'; Aliev 35'; B.Hyrum (yellow card); M.Saidgani (yellow card)	Summary	M.Hassan 24'; S.Karimov 50' (pen.); Rabimov (yellow card)	Stadium: Pamir Stadium; Attendance: 400; Referee: Behrouz Murtazoev

== TFF Cup ==
=== Preliminary round ===
Pos	Team	Pld	W	D	L	GF	GA	GD	Pts	Qualification
1	(Tajikistan) Regar-TadAZ	7	6	1	0	34	4	+30	19	Advance to group stage
2	(Tajikistan) CSKA Pomir Dushanbe	7	5	0	2	33	8	+25	15	Advance to group stage
3	(Tajikistan) Istiklol	7	4	1	2	28	10	+18	13	Advance to group stage
4	(Tajikistan) Khayr Vahdat	7	3	3	1	15	7	+8	12	Advance to group stage
5	(Tajikistan) Pamir Dushanbe	7	2	2	3	8	18	−10	8	
6	(Tajikistan) Kuktosh	7	2	2	3	16	38	−22	8	
7	(Tajikistan) Barki Tajik	7	1	1	5	3	24	−21	4	
8	(Tajikistan) Lokomotive Dushanbe	7	0	0	7	3	31	−28	0	

Updated to match(es) played on 25 February 2016. Source: Istiklol

11 February 2016 1	Istiklol	0–1	CSKA Pamir Dushanbe	Dushanbe
15:00 (UTC+5)	O.Safarov (yellow card); N.Abdugaffor (yellow card)	Summary	Saidov 34'; F.Chakalov (yellow card); S.Qosimov (yellow card); Z.Juraboev (yellow card)	Stadium: Pamir Stadium; Attendance: 150; Referee: Erkin Madiboev

13 February 2016 2	Istiklol	1–4	Regar-TadAZ	Dushanbe
10:30 (UTC+5)	S.Boboev 75'; A.Zabirov (yellow card); O.Safarov (yellow card); N.Abdulgaffor (yellow card)	Summary	F.Karaev 17'; M.Muzaffarov 18', 77'; K.Tursunov 59' (yellow card); B.Choriyev (yellow card)	Stadium: Pamir Stadium; Attendance: 200; Referee: Dilovarshoh Orzu

15 February 2016 3	Istiklol	3–1	Lokomotive Dushanbe	Dushanbe
15:00 (UTC+5)	S.Jalilov 24', 36'; F.Qosimov 84'	Summary	N.Nosirov 75' (yellow card); B.Buriev (yellow card) U.Sobirov (yellow card)	Stadium: Pamir Stadium; Attendance: 70; Referee: Akmal Buriev

16 February 2016 4	Istiklol	2–2	Khayr Vahdat	Dushanbe
15:00 (UTC+5)	A.Mirzoyev 52'; S.Boboev 81' (yellow card); N.Abdulgaffor (yellow card)	Summary	J.Agbley 58'; M.Mirzoev 90+3'; Bobonazarov (yellow card)	Stadium: Pamir Stadium; Attendance: 500; Referee: Behrouz Murtazoev

19 February 2016 5	Istiklol	9–0	Pamir Dushanbe	Dushanbe
16:00 (UTC+5)	Dzhalilov 3', 56', 68'; Kablash 13', 16'; Babadjanov 52'; Vasiev 58', 76', 82'	Summary		Stadium: Pamir Stadium; Attendance: 500; Referee: Khusrawi Siddikzod

21 February 2016 6	Istiklol	2–1	Barki Tajik	Dushanbe
10:30 (UTC+5)	Z.Fuzaylov 4'; A.Mirzoyev 42' (yellow card); S.Boboev (yellow card); N.Abdulgaffor (yellow card); M.Khodzhaev (yellow card)	Summary	H.Darwesh 63'; B.Zohidov (yellow card)	Stadium: Pamir Stadium; Attendance: 100; Referee: Khusrawi Siddikzod

25 February 2016 7	Istiklol	11–1	Kuktosh	Dushanbe
15:00 (UTC+5)	A.Safarov 8', 27', 32'; Babadjanov 12', 14', 23', 25'; J.Aliyev 21'; Vasiev 36'; A.Zabirov 56'; E.Jalilov 71'	Summary	N.Abdulloev 22'	Stadium: Pamir Stadium; Attendance: 100; Referee: Akobir Fayzullozoda

=== Group stage ===
Pos	Team	Pld	W	D	L	GF	GA	GD	Pts	Qualification
1	(Tajikistan) CSKA Pomir Dushanbe	3	1	1	1	10	5	+5	4	Advance to semi-finals
2	(Tajikistan) Khujand	3	1	1	1	6	5	+1	4	Advance to semi-finals
3	(Tajikistan) Saroykamar	3	1	1	1	3	4	−1	4	
4	(Tajikistan) Istiklol	3	1	1	1	5	10	−5	4	

Updated to match(es) played on 4 March 2016. Source: Istiklol

1 March 2016 1	Saroykamar	0–2	Istiklol	Dushanbe
16:00 (UTC+5)	H.Yakubov (yellow card)	Summary	Kablash 37'; Ergashev 59' (yellow card); M.Chahjouyi (yellow card); Fatkhuloev (yellow card)	Stadium: Pamir Stadium; Referee: Behrouz Murtazoev

4 March 2016 2	Khujand	2–2	Istiklol	Dushanbe
16:00 (UTC+5)	D.Bozorov 50'; Tokhirov 54'	Summary	Dzhalilov 22'; Tukhtasunov 80' (o.g.); Davronov (yellow card) 84'	Stadium: Pamir Stadium

6 March 206 3	Istiklol	1–8	CSKA Pomir Dushanbe	Dushanbe
16:00 (UTC+5)	A.Mirzoyev 20'	Summary	A.Holmurodov 12'; A.Napoleon 17'; S.Gafforov 28', 45', 54'; S.Qosimov 48'; F.Rakhmatov 76'; R.Tolibov 85'	Stadium: Pamir Stadium; Attendance: 300; Referee: Dilovarshoh Orzu

== Competitions ==
=== Tajik Supercup ===
3 April 2016	Istiklol	3–2	Khujand	Tursunzoda
14:00 (UTC+5)	Kablash 13', 82' (yellow card); Ergashev 21' (yellow card)	Summary	Tokhirov 20' (pen.); D.Karimov 73' (yellow card); S.Sanginov (yellow card); S.Sharipov (yellow card)	Stadium: Stadium Metallurg 1st District; Attendance: 4,000; Referee: Nasrullo Kabirov

=== Tajik League ===
==== Results summary ====
Overall								Home						Away					
Pld	W	D	L	GF	GA	GD	Pts	W	D	L	GF	GA	GD	W	D	L	GF	GA	GD
18	14	3	1	67	20	+47	45	9	0	0	46	13	+33	5	3	1	21	7	+14

Last updated: 2 November 2016.
Source: Soccerway

==== Results by round ====
Round	1	2	3	4	5	6	7	8	9	10	11	12	13	14	15	16	17	18
Ground	A	H	A	H	A	H	A	A	H	H	A	H	H	A	H	H	A	A
Result	W	W	W	W	W	W	D	D	W	W	D	W	W	L	W	W	W	W
Position	1	1	1	1	1	1	1	1	1	1	1	1	1	1	1	1	1	1

Source: Results
A = Away; H = Home; W = Win; D = Draw; L = Loss

==== Results ====
7 April 2016 1	Parvoz Bobojon Ghafurov	0–4	Istiklol	Dushanbe
16:00 (UTC+5)	B.Abdurahmonov (yellow card)	Summary	Asrorov 28'; Fatkhuloev 36', 80'; Dzhalilov 85'	Stadium: Republican Stadium; Attendance: 300; Referee: Behrouz Murtazoev

17 April 2016 2	Istiklol	4–2	Barki Tajik	Dushanbe
16:00 (UTC+5)	Fatkhuloev 5'; Ergashev (red card) 14'; Vasiev 31'; Babadjanov 45+1'; Dzhalilov 75' (pen.); Davronov (yellow card); Kablash (yellow card); S.Jalilov (yellow card)	Summary	Saidov (red card) 14'; Kovalchuk 50' (o.g.); Juraboev 66' (pen.); M.Hassan (yellow card); A.Safarov (yellow card); O.Abdugaffor (yellow card); E.Panchshanbe (yellow card)	Stadium: Republican Stadium; Attendance: 350; Referee: Dilovar Orzu

21 April 2016 3	Regar-TadAZ	2–3	Istiklol	Tursunzoda
16:00 (UTC+5)	K.Tursunov 5'; A.Sharipov 61'; B.Azimov (yellow card) 90+2'	Summary	Jalilov (yellow card) 24'; Kholmatov 49'; Dzhalilov 53', 66'; Umarbayev (yellow card) 68'; Kablash (yellow card) 90+2'	Stadium: Stadium Metallurg 1st District; Attendance: 4,000; Referee: Hurshed Dadoboev

1 May 2016 4	Istiklol	7–1	Ravshan	Dushanbe
16:30 (UTC+5)	Umarbayev 17', 37'; Kholmatov 32'; Dzhalilov 62', 75'; Babadjanov 78'; Aliev 84'	Summary	K.Abilov 88'; S.Amrohon (yellow card)	Stadium: Republican Stadium; Attendance: 2,000; Referee: Akobir Fayzullozoda

5 May 2016 5	Khujand	0–2	Istiklol	Khujand
16:30 (UTC+5)		Summary	Kovalchuk 67'; Nazarov 83'; Davronov (yellow card); Umarbayev (yellow card)	Stadium: 20 Years of Independence Stadium; Attendance: 1,600; Referee: Bahrom Sadulloev

15 May 2016 6	Istiklol	6–3	Vakhsh Qurghonteppa	Dushanbe
17:00 (UTC+5)	Vasiev 33'; Dzhalilov 35', 49'; Babadjanov 43'; Nazarov 71'; Fatkhuloev 80'; Ergashev (yellow card); Asrorov (yellow card); Jalilov (yellow card); Kovalchuk (yellow card)	Summary	Hakimov 67' (pen.); Sharipov 77'; Khamrakulov 90+1'; X.Uzokov (yellow card); F.Rizomov (yellow card)	Stadium: Republican Stadium; Attendance: 500; Referee: Behrouz Murtazoev

22 May 2016 7	Khayr Vahdat	0–0	Istiklol	Vahdat
17:00 (UTC+5)	Sodikov (yellow card); D.Sharipov (yellow card)	Summary	M.Chahjouyi (yellow card)	Stadium: Khair Stadium; Attendance: 2,500; Referee: Hurshed Dadaboev

12 June 2016 9	Khosilot Farkhor	1–1	Istiklol	Farkhar
18:00 (UTC+5)	Rabimov 29' (pen.); N.Rustamov (yellow card)	Summary	Dzhalilov 70' (yellow card); Sharipov (yellow card); Ergashev (yellow card)	Stadium: Central Stadium; Attendance: 8,500; Referee: Bahrom Sadulloev

19 June 2016 8	Istiklol	2–1	CSKA Pamir Dushanbe	Dushanbe
18:30 (UTC+5)	Dzhalilov 15'; Asrorov 45'; Kovalchuk (yellow card)	Summary	F.Chakalov 25'; S.Nana (yellow card)	Stadium: Republican Stadium; Attendance: 250; Referee: Hurshed Dadoboev

7 August 2016 10	Istiklol	2–1	Khosilot Farkhor	Dushanbe
18:00 (UTC+5)	Dzhalilov 8'; Juraboev 44'; Fatkhuloev (yellow card); Kovalchuk (yellow card)	Summary	K.Azizov 31'; Rajabov (yellow card)	Stadium: Republican Stadium; Attendance: 5,800; Referee: Saivali Turdiev

13 August 2016 11	CSKA Pamir Dushanbe	0–0	Istiklol	Dushanbe
18:00 (UTC+5)	P.Kashkarov (yellow card); F.Chakalov (yellow card)	Summary	Fatkhuloev (yellow card); Dzhalilov (yellow card)	Stadium: CSKA Stadium; Attendance: 2,500; Referee: Umed Rahimov

14 September 2016 12	Istiklol	4–1	Khayr Vahdat	Dushanbe
18:00 (UTC+5)	Fatkhuloev 33'; Aliev 51'; Dzhalilov 71'; Babadjanov 90'; Sharipov (yellow card)	Summary	U.Azizov 31'; D.Sharipov (yellow card)	Stadium: Republican Stadium; Attendance: 1,000; Referee: Hurshed Dadaboev

18 September 2016 14	Istiklol	10–1	Khujand	Dushanbe
16:00 (UTC+5)	Mawutor 36', 76', 80'; Dzhalilov 38', 63', 87' (pen.) (yellow card); Fatkhuloev 43'; Aliev 44', 65'; Babadjanov 58'	Summary	Tokhirov 79' (pen.); S.Sanginov (yellow card); D.Karimov (yellow card)	Stadium: Aviator Stadium; Attendance: 200; Referee: Saivali Turdiev

25 September 2016 15	Ravshan	2–1	Istiklol	Kulob
16:00 (UTC+5)	Z.Abdulhayrov 35' (pen.) (yellow card); M.Nazarov 90+2'; S.Amrohon (yellow card); S.Saydahmad (yellow card); D.Shomurodov (yellow card); F.Rustamov (yellow card); A.Hodzhimurodov (yellow card)	Summary	Aliev 62'; Juraboev (yellow card); K.Boboev (yellow card); Asrorov (yellow card); Fatkhuloev (yellow card)	Stadium: Kulob Central Stadium; Attendance: 2,000; Referee: Hurshed Dadoboev

10 October 2016 18	Istiklol	8–2	Parvoz Bobojon Ghafurov	Dushanbe
16:00 (UTC+5)	Dzhalilov 11', 16', 30', 43', 82'; Fatkhuloev 19', 23'; Mawutor 86'; Juraboev (yellow card)	Summary	M.Ghafoor 51'; B.Zokirov 56'; H.Vohidov (yellow card)	Stadium: Republican Stadium; Attendance: 300; Referee: Amirdzhon Horkashev

15 October 2016 16	Istiklol	3–1	Regar-TadAZ	Dushanbe
16:30 (UTC+5)	Dzhalilov 61'; Fatkhuloev 71'; D.Mavutor 90+4'; Asrorov (yellow card); Kovalchuk (yellow card)	Summary	S.Barotov 38'; B.Choriyev (yellow card)	Stadium: Republican Stadium; Attendance: 300; Referee: Bahrom Sadulloev

29 October 2016 17	Barki Tajik	1–5	Istiklol	Dushanbe
20:30 (UTC+5)	N.Khamrokul 80'; D.Yodgorov (yellow card); M.Hassan (yellow card); Suvonkulov (yellow card)	Summary	Aliev 9', 49'; Dzhalilov 23'; Fatkhuloev 90+2'; Vasiev 90+4'; D.Mavutor (yellow card)	Stadium: Republican Stadium; Attendance: 1,000; Referee: Saivali Turdiev

2 November 2016 13	Vakhsh Qurghonteppa	1–5	Istiklol	Qurghonteppa
14:00 (UTC+5)	Sharipov 80'; D.Bobokhon (yellow card)	Summary	Mawutor 8', 45+1'; S.Boboev 41', 60' (yellow card); Babadjanov 79'	Stadium: Tsentralnyi Stadium; Attendance: 500; Referee: Nasrullo Kabirov

==== League table ====
Pos	Team	Pld	W	D	L	GF	GA	GD	Pts	Qualification or relegation
1	Istiklol (C)	18	14	3	1	67	20	+47	45	2017 AFC Cup
2	Khosilot Farkhor	18	11	4	3	40	16	+24	37	2017 AFC Cup
3	Regar-TadAZ	18	10	2	6	36	23	+13	32	
4	Barki Tajik	18	9	2	7	32	25	+7	29	
5	Khayr Vahdat	18	8	5	5	29	25	+4	29	
6	CSKA Pamir Dushanbe	18	8	3	7	23	16	+7	27	
7	Khujand	18	8	1	9	22	37	−15	25	
8	Vakhsh	18	5	3	10	21	39	−18	18	
9	Ravshan Kulob (R)	18	2	3	13	17	50	−33	9	Relegation
10	Parvoz (R)	18	1	2	15	14	50	−36	5	Relegation

Updated to match(es) played on 14 November 2016. Source: Fifa
Rules for classification: 1) points; 2) goal difference; 3) number of goals scored.
(C) Champions; (R) Relegated

=== Tajik Cup ===
23 July 2016 Last 16 1st leg	Istiklol	7–0	Panjshir	Dushanbe
17:30 (UTC+5)	Dzhalilov 7', 9', 14'; Babadjanov 40'; S.Boboev 51', 66'; Panjshanbe 86'	Summary		Stadium: Republican Stadium; Attendance: 300; Referee: Bahrom Sadulloev

30 July 2016 Last 16 2nd leg	Panjshir	0–7 (0–14 agg.)	Istiklol	Kolkhozobod
(UTC+5)	R.Azizov; A.Todzhiahmedov (yellow card)	Summary	Sharipov 6'; Vasiev 32', 38', 63', 75'; Fatkhuloev 72'; Aliev 79'; Babadjanov (yellow card); Mawutor (yellow card); S.Jalilov (yellow card)	Stadium: Panjshir Uktam Mamatova; Attendance: 5,000; Referee: Amirdzhon Horkashev

20 August 2016 Quarterfinal 1st leg	Istiklol	1–1	Khayr Vahdat	Dushanbe
18:00 (UTC+5)	Dzhalilov 32'; Fatkhuloev (yellow card); Mawutor (yellow card)	Summary	M.Parpiev 74'; D.Mensah (yellow card); F.Shamsiev (yellow card); V.Sohibnazar (yellow card); D.Tugonshoev (yellow card)	Stadium: Republican Stadium; Referee: Sayëdzhon Zayniddinov

11 September 2016 Quarterfinal 2nd leg	Khayr Vahdat	0–3 (1–4 agg.)	Istiklol	Vahdat
16:00 (UTC+5)	M.Parpiev (yellow card)	Summary	Dzhalilov 38', 90+3'; Sharipov 83'; Mawutor (yellow card)	Stadium: Khair Stadium

1 October 2016 Semifinal 1st leg	Istiklol	4–0	Ravshan Kulob	Dushanbe
16:00 (UTC+5)	Mawutor 30' (yellow card); Dzhalilov 42', 45'; Babadjanov 90+2' (pen.); Asrorov (yellow card)	Summary	S.Saydahmad (yellow card)	Stadium: Republican Stadium; Attendance: 1,500; Referee: Saёёdzhon Zayniddinov

26 October 2016 Semifinal 2nd leg	Ravshan Kulob	0–0 (0–4 agg.)	Istiklol	Kulob
15:00 (UTC+5)	M.Nazarov (yellow card); Z.Rustamov (yellow card)	Summary	Kovalchuk (yellow card)	Stadium: Central Stadium; Referee: Khusrawi Siddikzod

==== Final ====
5 November 2016	Istiklol	2–2 (a.e.t.) (3–2 p)	Khosilot Farkhor	Dushanbe
14:00 (UTC+5)	Fatkhuloev 13'; Dzhalilov 44'; Mawutor (yellow card) 45'; Babadjanov (yellow card) 75'; Aliev (yellow card) 116'	Summary	Rabimov 33'; M.Sodik 37'; H.Azizov (yellow card) 64'; S.Gafforov (yellow card) 71'; Abdugafforov (yellow card) 72'	Stadium: Republican Stadium; Attendance: 6,000; Referee: Bahrom Sadulloev
	Penalties
	Aliev (penalty missed); Babadjanov (penalty scored); Fatkhuloev (penalty scored); Nazarov (penalty scored)		S.Karimov (penalty scored); Abdugafforov (penalty scored); H.Rasulov (penalty missed); Saidov (penalty missed); Rustamov (penalty missed)

=== AFC Cup ===
==== Group stage ====
Pos	Team	Pld	W	D	L	GF	GA	GD	Pts	Qualification
1	(Iraq) Naft Al-Wasat	6	5	0	1	9	3	+6	15	Knockout stage
2	(Jordan) Al-Faisaly	6	3	2	1	10	6	+4	11	Knockout stage
3	(Lebanon) Tripoli	6	2	1	3	8	10	−2	7	
4	(Tajikistan) Istiklol	6	0	1	5	4	12	−8	1	

Source: AFC

23 February 2015 1	Istiklol (Tajikistan)	0–0	(Jordan) Al-Faisaly	Dushanbe, Tajikistan
16:00 (UTC+5)	Davronov (yellow card) 19'	Report	M.Al-Jada (yellow card) 70'	Stadium: Republican Stadium; Attendance: 8,500; Referee: Võ Minh Trí (Vietnam)

8 March 2015 2	Tripoli (Lebanon)	2–1	(Tajikistan) Istiklol	Tripoli, Lebanon
18:00 (UTC+5)	A.Youssef 58'; W.Fatooh 87'	Report	Jalilov (yellow card) 7'; Kablash 55'; Nazarov (yellow card) 61'	Stadium: Tripoli Municipal Stadium; Attendance: 4,000; Referee: Çarymyrat Kurbanow (Turkmenistan)

15 March 2015 3	Naft Al-Wasat (Iraq)	2–0	(Tajikistan) Istiklol	Tehran, Iran
17:30 (UTC+5)	Al Shbli (yellow card) 39'; J.Mohammed 45+1'; Mardikian 70'	Report	Ergashev (yellow card) 30'; Davronov (yellow card) 39'; Nazarov (yellow card) 61'; J.Aliyev (yellow card) 30'; Kablash (yellow card) 90+1'	Stadium: PAS Ghavamin Stadium; Attendance: 150; Referee: Sukhbir Singh (Singapore)

12 April 2015 4	Istiklol (Tajikistan)	0–1	(Iraq) Naft Al-Wasat	Dushanbe, Tajikistan
19:00 (UTC+5)	Dzhalilov (yellow card) 22'; Jalilov (yellow card) 53'; Ergashev (yellow card) 83'	Report	J. Mohammed 90+2'; Sabri (yellow card) 90+3'	Stadium: Republican Stadium; Attendance: 8,000; Referee: Salah Abbas Alabbasi (Bahrain)

26 April 2015 5	Al-Faisaly (Jordan)	4–2	(Tajikistan) Istiklol	Amman, Jordan
16:30 (UTC+5)	Attiah 33', 86'; Al Rifai 38'; Y.Bukit 58'	Report	Kablash 68'; Umarbayev 78'	Stadium: Amman International Stadium; Referee: Marai Al-Awaji (Saudi Arabia)

10 May 2015 6	Istiklol (Tajikistan)	1–3	(Lebanon) Tripoli	Dushanbe, Tajikistan
19:00 (UTC+5)	Ergashev (yellow card) 38'; Dzhalilov (yellow card) 68'; Fatkhuloev 69'	Report	S.Youssef 45'; Helegbe 82'; El Qasaa (yellow card) 83'; Fattouh 86'	Stadium: Republican Stadium; Attendance: 6,000; Referee: Fu Ming (China)

== Squad statistics ==
As of match played 5 November 2016

=== Appearances and goals ===
No.	Pos	Nat	Player	Total		Tajik League		Tajik Cup		Tajik Supercup		AFC Cup	
No.	Pos	Nat	Player	Apps	Goals	Apps	Goals	Apps	Goals	Apps	Goals	Apps	Goals
1	GK	(Serbia) SRB	Nikola Stošić	28	0	15	0	6	0	1	0	6	0
2	DF	(Tajikistan) TJK	Siyovush Asrorov	28	2	15+1	2	7	0	0+1	0	4	0
3	DF	(Tajikistan) TJK	Tabrezi Davlatmir	5	0	1+2	0	1+1	0	0	0	0	0
4	MF	(Ghana) GHA	David Mawutor	18	8	11	7	7	1	0	0	0	0
9	FW	(Tajikistan) TJK	Jahongir Aliev	22	8	9+3	7	3+3	1	1	0	1+2	0
13	MF	(Tajikistan) TJK	Nozim Babadjanov	28	8	11+7	6	5+2	2	0+1	0	0+2	0
14	MF	(Tajikistan) TJK	Faridoon Sharipov	28	2	14+3	0	4+3	2	1	0	1+2	0
15	DF	(Ukraine) UKR	Petro Kovalchuk	30	1	16	1	7	0	1	0	6	0
17	FW	(Tajikistan) TJK	Dilshod Vasiev	29	7	15+1	3	6	4	1	0	4+2	0
18	MF	(Tajikistan) TJK	Fatkhullo Fatkhuloev	30	13	15+1	10	7	2	0+1	0	6	1
19	DF	(Tajikistan) TJK	Akhtam Nazarov	28	2	14+2	2	7	0	0	0	5	0
20	MF	(Tajikistan) TJK	Amirbek Juraboev	15	1	9	1	5+1	0	0	0	0	0
21	FW	(Tajikistan) TJK	Suhrob Jalilov	9	0	0+7	0	0+2	0	0	0	0	0
22	FW	(Tajikistan) TJK	Sheriddin Boboev	8	4	1+4	2	0+3	2	0	0	0	0
23	MF	(Tajikistan) TJK	Ehson Panjshanbe	7	1	1+3	0	2+1	1	0	0	0	0
24	MF	(Tajikistan) TJK	Oyatullo Safarov	3	0	0+1	0	0+2	0	0	0	0	0
27	MF	(Tajikistan) TJK	Ismail Alimardonov	4	0	0+4	0	0	0	0	0	0	0
35	GK	(Tajikistan) TJK	Kurban Boboev	6	0	3+2	0	1	0	0	0	0	0
63	MF	(Tajikistan) TJK	Manuchekhr Dzhalilov	30	31	16+1	22	6	9	0+1	0	6	0
Players away from Istiklol on loan:
Players who left Istiklol during the season:
5	DF	(Tajikistan) TJK	Jakhongir Jalilov	9	0	4	0	0	0	1	0	4	0
6	DF	(Iran) IRI	Mehdi Chahjouyi	9	0	4+1	0	0	0	0	0	4	0
7	MF	(Tajikistan) TJK	Parvizdzhon Umarbayev	12	3	5+1	2	0	0	1	0	5	1
8	MF	(Tajikistan) TJK	Nuriddin Davronov	15	0	7	0	2	0	1	0	5	0
10	FW	(Ukraine) UKR	Oleksandr Kablash	9	4	3	0	0	0	1	2	5	2
11	MF	(Tajikistan) TJK	Akmal Kholmatov	10	2	2+2	2	0	0	1	0	0+5	0
26	DF	(Tajikistan) TJK	Davron Ergashev	11	1	6	0	0	0	1	1	4	0

=== Goal scorers ===
Place	Position	Nation	Number	Name	Tajik League	Tajik Cup	Tajik Supercup	AFC Cup	Total
1	MF	(Tajikistan)	63	Manuchekhr Dzhalilov	22	9	0	0	31
2	MF	(Tajikistan)	18	Fatkhullo Fatkhuloev	10	2	0	1	13
3	FW	(Tajikistan)	9	Jahongir Aliev	7	1	0	0	8
3	MF	(Ghana)	4	David Mawutor	7	1	0	0	8
3	MF	(Tajikistan)	13	Nozim Babadjanov	6	2	0	0	8
6	FW	(Tajikistan)	17	Dilshod Vasiev	3	4	0	0	7
7	FW	(Tajikistan)	22	Sheriddin Boboev	2	2	0	0	4
7	FW	(Ukraine)	10	Oleksandr Kablash	0	0	2	2	4
9	MF	(Tajikistan)	7	Parvizdzhon Umarbayev	2	0	0	1	3
10	MF	(Tajikistan)	11	Akmal Kholmatov	2	0	0	0	2
10	DF	(Tajikistan)	19	Akhtam Nazarov	2	0	0	0	2
10	DF	(Tajikistan)	2	Siyovush Asrorov	2	0	0	0	2
10	MF	(Tajikistan)	14	Faridoon Sharipov	0	2	0	0	2
14	DF	(Ukraine)	15	Petro Kovalchuk	1	0	0	0	1
14	MF	(Tajikistan)	20	Amirbek Juraboev	1	0	0	0	1
14	MF	(Tajikistan)	23	Ehson Panjshanbe	0	1	0	0	1
14	DF	(Tajikistan)	26	Davron Ergashev	0	0	1	0	1
				TOTALS	67	24	3	4	96

=== Disciplinary record ===
Number	Nation	Position	Name	Tajik League		Tajik Cup		Tajik Supercup		AFC Cup		Total	
Number	Nation	Position	Name	Yellow card	Red card	Yellow card	Red card	Yellow card	Red card	Yellow card	Red card	Yellow card	Red card
2	(Tajikistan)	DF	Siyovush Asrorov	3	0	2	0	0	0	0	0	5	0
4	(Ghana)	MF	David Mawutor	1	0	5	0	0	0	0	0	6	0
5	(Tajikistan)	DF	Jakhongir Jalilov	2	0	0	0	0	0	2	0	4	0
6	(Iran)	DF	Mehdi Chahjouyi	1	0	0	0	0	0	0	0	1	0
7	(Tajikistan)	MF	Parvizdzhon Umarbayev	2	0	0	0	0	0	0	0	2	0
8	(Tajikistan)	MF	Nuriddin Davronov	2	0	0	0	0	0	2	0	4	0
9	(Tajikistan)	FW	Jahongir Aliev	0	0	1	0	0	0	1	0	2	0
10	(Ukraine)	FW	Oleksandr Kablash	2	0	0	0	1	0	1	0	4	0
13	(Tajikistan)	MF	Nozim Babadjanov	0	0	1	0	0	0	0	0	1	0
14	(Tajikistan)	MF	Faridoon Sharipov	2	0	0	0	0	0	0	0	2	0
15	(Tajikistan)	DF	Petro Kovalchuk	4	0	1	0	0	0	0	0	5	0
18	(Tajikistan)	MF	Fatkhullo Fatkhuloev	3	0	1	0	0	0	0	0	4	0
19	(Tajikistan)	DF	Akhtam Nazarov	0	0	0	0	0	0	2	0	2	0
20	(Tajikistan)	MF	Amirbek Juraboev	2	0	0	0	0	0	0	0	2	0
21	(Tajikistan)	FW	Suhrob Jalilov	1	0	1	0	0	0	0	0	2	0
26	(Tajikistan)	DF	Davron Ergashev	2	1	0	0	1	0	3	0	6	1
35	(Tajikistan)	GK	Kurban Boboev	1	0	0	0	0	0	0	0	1	0
63	(Tajikistan)	MF	Manuchekhr Dzhalilov	3	0	0	0	0	0	2	0	5	0
			TOTALS	31	1	12	0	2	0	13	0	58	1

== Notes ==
1. Teams from Iraq are not allowed to host their home matches in their country due to security concerns.
