= 2016 Tajik Super Cup =

- Event: Tajik Super Cup
Istiklol	Khujand
3	2
- Date: 3 April 2016
- Venue: Stadium Metallurg 1st District, Tursunzoda
- Man of the Match: Oleksandr Kablash
- Referee: Nasrullo Kabirov
- Attendance: 4,000

The 2016 Tajik Supercup was the 7th Tajik Supercup, an annual Tajik football match played between the winners of the previous season's Tajik League and Tajik Cup. The match was contested by 2015 Tajik League and 2015 Tajik Cup champions, Istiklol, and the 2015 Tajik League Runners-up, Khujand. It was held at Stadium Metallurg 1st District in Tursunzoda four days before the first game of the 2016 Tajik League. Istiklol won the match 3–2 thanks to an 82nd-minute winner from Oleksandr Kablash, his second of the match. After Istiklol took the lead through Kablash, Khujand equalised through Farkhod Tokhirov from the penalty spot, before Davron Ergashev restored Istiklol's lead shortly after. Dilshodzhon Karimov squared the game up midway through the second half, before Kablash's second gave Istiklol their sixth Supercup title.

== Match details ==
3 April 2016

Istiklol	3–2	Khujand
Kablash 13', 82'; Ergashev 21'	Report	Tokhirov 20' (pen.); D.Karimov 73'

Stadium Metallurg 1st District, Tursunzoda
Attendance: 4,000
Referee: Nasrullo Kabirov

Istiklol	Khujand

GK	1	(Serbia) Nikola Stošić
DF	5	(Tajikistan) Jakhongir Jalilov
DF	15	(Ukraine) Petro Kovalchuk
DF	26	(Tajikistan) Davron Ergashev	Booked
MF	7	(Tajikistan) Parvizdzhon Umarbayev
MF	8	(Tajikistan) Nuriddin Davronov		(substituted off) 46'
MF	11	(Tajikistan) Akmal Kholmatov		(substituted off) 62'
MF	14	(Tajikistan) Faridoon Sharipov		(substituted off) 77'
FW	9	(Tajikistan) Jahongir Aliev		(substituted off) 88'
FW	10	(Ukraine) Oleksandr Kablash	Booked
FW	17	(Tajikistan) Dilshod Vasiev
Substitutes:
DF	2	(Tajikistan) Siyovush Asrorov		(substituted in) 46'
MF	13	(Tajikistan) Nozim Babadjanov		(substituted in) 62'
FW	63	(Tajikistan) Manuchekhr Dzhalilov		(substituted in) 77'
MF	18	(Tajikistan) Fatkhullo Fatkhuloev		(substituted in) 88'
Manager:
(Tajikistan) Mubin Ergashev Assistant referees: Fourth official:

GK		(Tajikistan) Muminjon Gadoyboev
DF	2	(Tajikistan) Sohibdzhon Khakimov
DF	5	(Tajikistan) Sherozi Abdulloev
DF	22	(Tajikistan) Manouchehr Ahmadov
		(Tajikistan) Sherozi Sanginov	Booked	(substituted off) 61'
MF	10	(Tajikistan) Ilhomdzhon Barotov		(substituted off) 90'
MF	6	(Tajikistan) Hodzhiboy Ziyoev
MF	23	(Tajikistan) Dilshodzhon Karimov	Booked
MF		(Tajikistan) Ruslan Rakhmatov
FW	11	(Tajikistan) Farkhod Tokhirov
FW	15	(Tajikistan) Dilshod Bozoro		(substituted off) 64'
Substitutes:
MF	18	(Tajikistan) Saidjon Sharipov	Booked	(substituted in) 61'
FW	17	(Tajikistan) Marifdzhon Marifboev		(substituted in) 64'
MF		(Tajikistan) Abdumalik Shodiev		(substituted in) 90'
Manager:

== See also ==
- 2015 Tajik League
- 2015 Tajik Cup
