= 2015 FC Istiklol season =

FC Istiklol
2015 season
- President: Shohruh Saidov
- Manager: Mubin Ergashev
- Stadium: Republican Stadium
- Tajik League: 1st
- Tajik Cup: Winners
- Tajik Supercup: Winners
- AFC Cup: Runners Up v Johor Darul Ta'zim
- Top goalscorer: League: Manuchekhr Dzhalilov (22); All: Manuchekhr Dzhalilov (30)

The FC Istiklol 2015 season is Istiklol's seventh Tajik League season. They are the current defending Champions in the Tajik League, Tajik Cup and Tajik Supercup having completed a Domestic Treble during the 2014 season. They will also participate in the AFC Cup for the first time, entering at the group stage.

== Squad ==
As of match played 28 November 2015

No.	Name	Nationality	Position	Date of birth (age)	Signed from	Signed in	Contract ends	Apps.	Goals
Goalkeepers
1	Nikola Stošić	(Serbia)	GK	15 March 1994 (aged 21)	Železničar Beograd	2013		33	0
16	Alisher Tuychiev	(Tajikistan)	GK	8 March 1976 (aged 39)	Vakhsh Qurghonteppa	2011			
35	Kurban Boboev	(Tajikistan)	GK	3 August 1987 (aged 28)	Istaravshan	2015		3	0
Defenders
2	Siyovush Asrorov	(Tajikistan)	DF	21 July 1992 (aged 23)	Khujand	2013		50	6
3	Sokhib Suvonkulov	(Tajikistan)	DF	15 September 1988 (aged 27)	Vakhsh Qurghonteppa	2009			
4	Eraj Rajabov	(Tajikistan)	DF	9 November 1990 (aged 25)	Dynamo Dushanbe	2009			
6	José Ballester	(Spain)	DF	10 June 1989 (aged 26)	La Roda	2015		22	2
15	Petro Kovalchuk	(Ukraine)	DF	28 May 1984 (aged 31)	Slutsk	2015		35	0
19	Akhtam Nazarov	(Tajikistan)	DF	29 September 1992 (aged 23)	Energetik Dushanbe	2013		66	5
20	Ziёvuddin Fuzaylov	(Tajikistan)	DF	7 March 2000 (aged 15)	Youth Team	2015		21	5
22	Mehdi Chahjouyi	(Iran)	DF	22 July 1989 (aged 26)	Shahrdari Bandar Abbas	2015		26	2
Midfielders
7	Umedzhon Sharipov	(Tajikistan)	MF	4 October 1992 (aged 23)	Vakhsh Qurghonteppa	2012			
8	Nuriddin Davronov	(Tajikistan)	MF	16 January 1991 (aged 24)	Sloboda Užice	2013			
9	Khurshed Makhmudov	(Tajikistan)	MF	8 August 1982 (aged 33)	Regar-TadAZ	2014		52	17
11	Jakhongir Jalilov	(Tajikistan)	MF	28 September 1989 (aged 26)	Youth Team	2009			
18	Fatkhullo Fatkhuloev	(Tajikistan)	MF	24 March 1990 (aged 25)	Dynamo Dushanbe	2008			
21	Romish Jalilov	(Tajikistan)	MF	21 November 1995 (aged 20)	Youth Team	2012			
39	Parvizdzhon Umarbayev	(Tajikistan)	MF	1 November 1994 (aged 21)	Khimik Dzerzhinsk	2015		32	5
Forwards
10	Manolo Bleda	(Spain)	FW	31 July 1990 (aged 25)	Belshina Bobruisk	2014		40	15
12	Amirdzhon Safarov	(Tajikistan)	FW	18 February 1995 (aged 20)	Youth Team	2015		6	1
17	Dilshod Vasiev	(Tajikistan)	FW	12 February 1988 (aged 27)	Energetik Dushanbe	2009			
63	Manuchekhr Dzhalilov	(Tajikistan)	FW	27 September 1990 (aged 25)	Neftekhimik Nizhnekamsk	2015		30	30
	Sheriddin Boboev	(Tajikistan)	FW	21 April 1999 (aged 16)	Youth Team	2015		1	0
Out on loan
5	Alisher Safarov	(Tajikistan)	DF	24 June 1998 (aged 17)	Youth Team	2014		7	0
12	Jahongir Ergashev	(Tajikistan)	FW	6 March 1994 (aged 21)	CSKA Pamir Dushanbe	2013		37	17
30	Emomali Soniev	(Tajikistan)	GK	7 November 1996 (aged 19)	Youth Team	2013		1	0

=== Out on loan ===
Note: Flags indicate national team as defined under FIFA eligibility rules; some limited exceptions apply. Players may hold more than one non-FIFA nationality.

No.	Pos.	Nation	Player
5	DF	TJK	Alisher Safarov (at Vakhsh)
12	FW	TJK	Jahongir Ergashev (at Khujand)

No.	Pos.	Nation	Player
30	FW	TJK	Emomali Soniev (at Barki Tajik)

== Transfers ==
=== Winter ===
In: Note: Flags indicate national team as defined under FIFA eligibility rules; some limited exceptions apply. Players may hold more than one non-FIFA nationality.

No.	Pos.	Nation	Player
3	DF	TJK	Sokhib Suvonkulov (loan return from (Tajikistan) Vakhsh)
5	MF	TJK	Alisher Safarov (loan return from (Tajikistan) Vakhsh)
6	DF	ESP	José Ballester (from (Spain) La Roda)
15	DF	UKR	Petro Kovalchuk (from (Belarus) Slutsk)
22	DF	IRI	Mehdi Chahjouyi (from (Iran) Shahrdari Bandar Abbas)
35	GK	TJK	Kurban Boboev (from (Tajikistan) Istaravshan)
39	MF	TJK	Parvizdzhon Umarbayev (from (Russia) Khimik Dzerzhinsk)
63	MF	TJK	Manuchekhr Dzhalilov (from (Russia) Neftekhimik Nizhnekamsk)

Out: Note: Flags indicate national team as defined under FIFA eligibility rules; some limited exceptions apply. Players may hold more than one non-FIFA nationality.

No.	Pos.	Nation	Player
3	DF	BRA	Glaúber da Silva (to (El Salvador) Pasaquina)
6	DF	TJK	Naim Ulmasov
9	FW	UZB	Davron Mirzaev (to (Tajikistan) Regar-TadAZ)
12	FW	TJK	Dzhakhongir Ergashev (loan to (Tajikistan) Khujand)
14	MF	GHA	David Mawutor
21	MF	TJK	Romish Jalilov (loan to (Tajikistan) Regar-TadAZ)
22	FW	TJK	Kamil Saidov (to (Tajikistan) Regar-TadAZ)
30	GK	TJK	Emomali Sonievym (to (Tajikistan) Barki Tajik)

=== Summer ===
In: Note: Flags indicate national team as defined under FIFA eligibility rules; some limited exceptions apply. Players may hold more than one non-FIFA nationality.

No.	Pos.	Nation	Player
—	DF	RUS	Muhammad Nazarov (Trial)

Out: Note: Flags indicate national team as defined under FIFA eligibility rules; some limited exceptions apply. Players may hold more than one non-FIFA nationality.

No.	Pos.	Nation	Player
5	MF	TJK	Alisher Safarov (loan to (Tajikistan) Vakhsh)

== Friendlies ==
8 January 2015	Istiklol	2–1	Tajikistan U-21	Dushanbe
13:00 (UTC+5)	Abugafforov 89' (o.g.); Fatkhuloev 90+3' (pen.); Boboev (yellow card)	Summary	Aliyev 76' (pen.); Abdugaffor (yellow card); Rakhmonov (yellow card)	Stadium: Pamir Stadium; Attendance: 500; Referee: Farruhi Siddikzod

13 January 2015 Sanatorium Bahoriston Cup	Istiklol	2–2	Khujand	Qayraqqum
(UTC+5)	Rajabov 32'; Nazarov 56'; Davronov (yellow card); J.Jalilov (yellow card)	Summary	F.Bobiev 48' (pen.); Tokhirov 52'; K.Mirzohon (yellow card); D.Bozorov (yellow card)	Stadium: National Bank; Attendance: 250; Referee: Erkin Madiboev

16 January 2015 Sanatorium Bahoriston Cup	Istiklol	3–0	Khayr Vahdat	Qayraqqum
(UTC+5)	Vasiev 22'; Bleda 24'; Davronov 89' (pen.) (yellow card)	Summary	Sharipov (yellow card) (red card) 89'; Mirzoyev (yellow card); Karimov (yellow card)	Stadium: National Bank; Attendance: 100; Referee: Hurshed Dadaboev

18 January 2015 Sanatorium Bahoriston Cup	Istiklol	1–1	Tajikistan U-19	Qayraqqum
(UTC+5)	Bleda 42' (yellow card); Fatkhuloev (yellow card); Suvonkulov (yellow card)	Summary	O.Karimov 88'; H.Hassan (yellow card); A.Asimov (yellow card); N.Abdul (yellow card); E.Panjshanbe (yellow card)	Stadium: National Bank; Attendance: 100; Referee: Hurshed Dadoboev

20 January 2015 Sanatorium Bahoriston Cup	Istiklol	2–3	Eskhata	Qayraqqum
(UTC+5)	A.Shodiev 3'; D.Isoev 89' (yellow card); A.Yahyahudzhaev (yellow card)	Summary	Bleda 26'; Vasiev 42', 90+3' (yellow card); Asrorov (yellow card); Suvonkulov (yellow card)	Stadium: National Bank; Attendance: 100; Referee: Erkin Madiboev

23 January 2015 Sanatorium Bahoriston Cup	Istiklol (Tajikistan)	7–0	(Kazakhstan) Zhetysu-2	Qayraqqum
(UTC+5)	Vasiev 3', 41'; Bleda 42', 57'; Fatkhuloev 49', 70'; Makhmudov 78'	Summary		Stadium: National Bank; Referee: Murod Kurbonov

30 January 2015	Istiklol	6–1	CSKA Pomir Dushanbe	Dushanbe
15:00 (UTC+5)	Bleda 4', 23'; Dzhalilov 9', 51', 76'; Vasiev 51'; Davronov (yellow card) .' (yellow-red card) 79'	Summary	Chakalov (yellow card) 34' (red card); Dodkhudoev 58' (yellow card); Saeed (yellow card)	Stadium: Pamir Stadium; Attendance: 200; Referee: Erkin Madiboev

7 February 2015	Istiklol (Tajikistan)	1–2	(Germany) SV Elversberg	Antalya, Turkey
20:00 (UTC+5)	Bleda 1'	Summary	Tunjić 6' (pen.); Kohler 29'

10 February 2015	Istiklol (Tajikistan)	1–1	(Germany) TSG Neustrelitz	Antalya, Turkey
20:00 (UTC+5)	Vasiev 70'	Summary	K.Weidlich 35' (pen.)

13 February 2015	Istiklol (Tajikistan)	1–2	(Uzbekistan) Neftchi	Antalya, Turkey
20:00 (UTC+5)	Ergashev 35'	Summary	Kholmatov 12'; S.Khakimov 47'

16 February 2015	Istiklol (Tajikistan)	5–6	(Russia) Amkar Perm Youth Team	Antalya, Turkey
14:00 (UTC+5)	Ergashev 11', 42'; Sharipov 16' (pen.); Suvonkulov 74'; Vasiev 84'	Summary	Tyukalov 17', 57'; A.Anfyorov 33', 49'; R.Vazitdinov 55'; Simonovski 89'

20 June 2015	Istiklol (Tajikistan)	2–3	(Russia) Gazovik Orenburg	Dushanbe
20:00 (UTC+5)	Dzhalilov 18'; Nazarov 90+2'	Summary	Shogenov 40'; Breyev 53'; Kabutov 87'	Stadium: Pamir Stadium; Attendance: 5,500

17 July 2015	Istiklol	2–0	Tajikistan U-19	Dushanbe
18:00 (UTC+5)	Fatkhuloev; Bleda; Chahjouyi (yellow card); Umarbayev (yellow card)	Summary	E.Panchshanbe (yellow card)	Stadium: Pamir Stadium; Referee: Khusrawi Siddikzod

21 July 2015	Istiklol	3–2	Tajikistan U-19	Almosi
18:00 (UTC+5)	Bleda 5'; Davronov 11' (pen.) (yellow card); A.Safarov 59'; Rajabov (yellow card)	Summary	H.Malodustov 68' (yellow card); N.Khamrokul 82'	Attendance: 300; Referee: Parviz Murtazoev

== TFF Cup ==
=== Preliminary round ===
Pos	Team	Pld	W	D	L	GF	GA	GD	Pts	Qualification
1	(Tajikistan) Istiklol	5	5	0	0	42	2	+40	15	Advance to Tajik Cup
2	(Tajikistan) CSKA Pomir Dushanbe	5	4	0	1	10	9	+1	12	Advance to Tajik Cup
3	(Tajikistan) Regar-TadAZ	5	3	0	2	8	7	+1	9	Advance to Tajik Cup
4	(Tajikistan) Khayr Vahdat	5	1	0	4	8	16	−8	3	Advance to Tajik Cup
5	(Tajikistan) Lokomotive Dushanbe	5	1	0	4	2	16	−14	3	
6	(Tajikistan) Kuktosh	5	1	0	4	4	24	−20	3	

Updated to match(es) played on 5 March 2015. Source: Istiklol
Rules for classification: Tiebreakers

18 February 2015 1	Istiklol	16–0	Kuktosh	Dushanbe
15:30 (UTC+5)	Ergashev 6', 37', 54', 63', 85'; Sharipov 18', 27'; Dzhalilov 53', 67', 73', 84', 87', 88'; R.Jalilov 59', 82'; Umarbayev 89'	Summary		Stadium: Pamir Stadium; Attendance: 500; Referee: Parviz Murtazoev

20 February 2015 2	Istiklol	5–0	Regar-TadAZ	Dushanbe
10:30 (UTC+5)	Bleda 58'; Fatkhuloev 65', 69', 80'; Umarbayev 87'	Summary	Choriev (yellow card)	Stadium: Pamir Stadium; Referee: Azam Buriev

22 February 2015 3	Istiklol	8–0	CSKA Pomir Dushanbe	Dushanbe
(UTC+5)		Summary		Stadium: Pamir Stadium

28 February 2015 4	Istiklol	4–0	Lokomotive Dushanbe	Dushanbe
15:00 (UTC+5)	Fuzaylov 6'; Bleda 42'; R.Jalilov 60'; Sharipov 71' (pen.); Umarbayev (yellow card)	Summary	Ismailov (yellow card)	Stadium: Pamir Stadium; Attendance: 300; Referee: Sayod Zayniddinov

2 March 2015 5	Istiklol	9–2	Khayr Vahdat	Dushanbe
15:00 (UTC+5)	Suvonkulov 6'; Makhmudov 9'; Fatkhuloev 34', 54', 60'; Vasiev 35', 44', 57' (yellow card); Umarbayev Nn 47'; Kovalchuk (yellow card)	Summary	Khomidov 22', 77'; F.Safarmadov (yellow card); S.Azimzoda (yellow card)	Stadium: Pamir Stadium; Attendance: 200; Referee: Parviz Murtazoev

=== Group stage ===
Pos	Team	Pld	W	D	L	GF	GA	GD	Pts	Qualification
1	(Tajikistan) Istiklol	3	3	0	0	20	3	+17	9	Advance to Knock Out Stage
2	(Tajikistan) Regar-TadAZ	1	0	0	1	0	2	−2	0	Advance to Knock Out Stage
3	(Tajikistan) Ravshan Kulob	1	0	0	1	2	5	−3	0	
4	(Tajikistan) Kairakkum	1	0	0	1	1	13	−12	0	

Updated to match(es) played on 5 March 2015. Source: Istiklol
Rules for classification: Tiebreakers

4 March 2015 1	Istiklol	2–0	Regar-TadAZ	Dushanbe
15:00 (UTC+5)	Fatkhuloev 4'; Nazarov 65'; Manolo Bleda (yellow card); J.Jalilov (yellow card)	Summary	Sharipov (yellow card); Qalandarov (yellow card)	Stadium: Pamir Stadium; Attendance: 200; Referee: Dilovar ORZU

6 March 2015 2	Istiklol	5–2	Ravshan Kulob	Dushanbe
15:00 (UTC+5)	Umarbayev 30' (yellow card); Bleda 36' (yellow card); Vasiev 43'; Makhmudov 65', 80'; Fatkhuloev (yellow card)	Summary	Rustamov 53', 58' (pen.) (yellow card); Amrohon (yellow card); Rakhmonov (yellow card)	Stadium: Pamir Stadium; Attendance: 2,000; Referee: Bahram Sadulloev

8 March 2015 3	Istiklol	13–1	Kairakkum	Dushanbe
12:00 (UTC+5)	Dzhalilov 9', 45', 62', 90'; Sharipov 45+1'; Makhmudov 49'; Vasiev 64', 75'; Fatkhuloev 68', 80' (pen.); J.Jalilov 77', 89'; Razzokov 83' (o.g.)	Summary	Dadabaev 36'; F.Niyazov (yellow card)	Stadium: Pamir Stadium; Attendance: 400; Referee: Sayod Zayniddinov

=== Knockout-stage ===
13 March 2015 Semifinal	Istiklol	4–0	CSKA Pomir Dushanbe	Dushanbe
15:00 (UTC+5)	Makhmudov 64', 90+2'; Bleda 75' (pen.); Fatkhuloev 90'	Summary	Kalugin (yellow card); Dodhudoev (yellow card)	Stadium: Pamir Stadium; Attendance: 500; Referee: Dilovar Orzu

15 March 2015 Final	Istiklol	5–1	Khayr Vahdat	Dushanbe
15:00 (UTC+5)	Sharipov 38', 85', 90'; Fatkhuloev 48'; Dzhalilov 79'; R.Jalilov (yellow card); Ballester (yellow card)	Summary	Muzaffarov (yellow card) 70'; Safarov 90+2'	Stadium: Pamir Stadium; Attendance: 3,000; Referee: Hurshed Dadaboev

== Competitions ==
=== Tajik Supercup ===
5 April 2015	Istiklol	2–2 (a.e.t.) (4–3 p)	Khayr Vahdat	Dushanbe
18:00 (UTC+5)	Makhmudov 38'; Fatkhuloev 42' (yellow card) 116'; Kovalchuk (yellow card) 52'; Davronov (yellow card) 104'	Summary	Safarmadov (yellow card) 24'; Murodov (yellow card) 60'; Muzaffarov 70', 86'	Stadium: Central Republican Stadium; Referee: Nasrullo Kabirov
	Penalties
	Davronov (penalty scored); Umarbayev (penalty scored); Fatkhuloev (penalty scored); Bleda (penalty missed); Sharipov (penalty scored)		Sharifov (penalty scored); Muzaffarov (penalty scored); Saburov (penalty missed); Parpiev (penalty scored); Sharipov (penalty missed)

=== Tajik League ===
==== Results summary ====
Overall								Home						Away					
Pld	W	D	L	GF	GA	GD	Pts	W	D	L	GF	GA	GD	W	D	L	GF	GA	GD
18	16	2	0	69	5	+64	50	9	0	0	38	2	+36	7	2	0	31	3	+28

Last updated: 22 November 2015.
Source: Soccerway

==== Results by round ====
Round	1	2	3	4	5	6	7	8	9	10	11	12	13	14	15	16	17	18
Ground	H	A	H	A	H	A	H	A	H	A	H	A	H	H	A	A	H	A
Result	W	W	W	W	W	W	W	W	W	W	W	D	W	W	W	D	W	W
Position	1	1	1	1	1	1	1	1	1	1	1	1	1	1	1	1	1	1

Source: Soccerway
A = Away; H = Home; W = Win; D = Draw; L = Loss

==== Results ====
9 April 2015 1	Istiklol	2–0	FK Khujand	Dushanbe
17:00 (UTC+5)	Davronov 69' (yellow card); Khakimov 90+1' (o.g.); Asrorov (yellow card); Rajabov (yellow card)	Summary	Khakimov (yellow card)	Stadium: Republican Stadium; Attendance: 2,000; Referee: Dilovar Orzu

18 April 2015 2	Barki Tajik	0–5	Istiklol	Dushanbe
16:00 (UTC+5)	A.Juraev (yellow card) 19'; S.Hotham (yellow card) 78'	Summary	Bleda 12', 34'; Suvonkulov (yellow card) 22'; Chahjouyi 24'; Sharipov 40'; R.Jalilov (yellow card) 65'; Makhmudov 84'	Stadium: Republican Stadium; Attendance: 500; Referee: Khusrawi Siddikzod

24 April 2015 3	Istiklol	8–0	Parvoz	Dushanbe
16:30 (UTC+5)	Vasiev 13', 89'; Bleda 28'; Umarbayev 47'; R.Jalilov 58'; Dzhalilov 63'; Suvonkulov 76'; Sharipov 78'; Fuzaylov (yellow card) 82'	Summary	B.Zokirov (yellow card) 30'	Stadium: Republican Stadium

4 May 2015 4	CSKA Pomir Dushanbe	1–5	Istiklol	Dushanbe
17:00 (UTC+5)	D.Tuhtasunov 42'; S.Kovussho (yellow card) 60'; A.Holmurodov (yellow card) 86'	Summary	Dzhalilov 15', 17', 38', 53'; Vasiev 67'; Kovalchuk (yellow card) 80'; R.Jalilov (yellow card) 84'	Stadium: CSKA Stadium; Attendance: 800; Referee: Nasrullo Kabirov

8 May 2015 5	Istiklol	6–1	Ravshan	Dushanbe
17:00 (UTC+5)	Chahjouyi (yellow card) 6'; Fatkhuloev 40'; Asrorov 44'; Vasiev 50'; Fuzaylov 52'; R.Jalilov 68'; Makhmudov 84'	Summary	Suhrob 22'; Saydahmada (yellow card) 60'; Rustamov (yellow card) 72'	Stadium: Republican Stadium

18 May 2015 6	Daleron-Uroteppa	0–1	Istiklol	Istaravshan
17:00 (UTC+5)	Musoev (yellow card) 30'; Takyi (yellow card)	Summary	Ballester 3'; Rajabov (yellow card) 18'; Kovalchuk (yellow card) 64'	Stadium: Central Stadium; Attendance: 8,400; Referee: Bahram Sadulloev

29 May 2015 7	Istiklol	1–0	Regar-TadAZ	Dushanbe
18:00 (UTC+5)	Fatkhuloev 66'	Summary	Saidov (yellow card) 80'	Stadium: Republican Stadium; Attendance: 500; Referee: Parviz Murtazoev

24 June 2015 8	Khayr Vahdat	0–1	Istiklol	Vahdat
18:00 (UTC+5)	B.Francis (yellow card) 16'; A.Saburov (yellow card) 60'	Summary	Davronov (yellow card) 24'; Vasiev 86'	Stadium: Khair Stadium

28 June 2015 9	Istiklol	5–0	Vakhsh Qurghonteppa	Dushanbe
(UTC+5)	Umarbayev (yellow card) 40' (goal) 50'; Dzhalilov 42', 76'; Fatkhuloev 58', 72'	Summary		Stadium: Republican Stadium; Referee: Bahram Sadulloev

1 August 2015 10	Vakhsh Qurghonteppa	0–3	Istiklol	Qurghonteppa
18:00 (UTC+5)	T.Davlatmir (yellow card); B.Khair (yellow card)	Summary	Makhmudov 64'; Dzhalilov 65'; Fatkhuloev 76'	Stadium: Tsentralnyi Stadium; Attendance: 3,000; Referee: Umed Rahimov

9 August 2015 11	Istiklol	8–0	Khayr Vahdat	Dushanbe
17:00 (UTC+5)	Dzhalilov 6', 23', 27', 61', 65'; Fatkhuloev 59', 72'; Fuzaylov 90'; Vasiev (yellow card)	Summary	S.Huseynzoda (yellow card)	Stadium: Republican Stadium; Attendance: 1,000; Referee: Parviz Murtazoev

15 August 2015 12	Regar-TadAZ	0–0	Istiklol	Regar
17:00 (UTC+5)	N.Babadzhanov (yellow card) 28'; Choriev (yellow card) 54'; Tukhtasunov (yellow card) 66'	Summary	Davronov (yellow card) 28'	Stadium: Stadium Metallurg 1st District

11 September 2015 13	Istiklol	4–0	Daleron-Uroteppa	Dushanbe
17:00 (UTC+5)	Fatkhuloev 45'; Nazarov 58'; Davronov (yellow card) 63'; Asrorov 84'; Dzhalilov 86'	Summary	D.Boykuziev (yellow card) 43'	Stadium: Republican Stadium; Referee: Parviz Murtazoev

21 October 2015 14	Istiklol	1–0	CSKA Pomir Dushanbe	Dushanbe
15:00 (UTC+5)	Dzhalilov 15' (pen.)	Summary	Staruschenko (red card) 67'; Napoleon (yellow card); Kovussho (yellow card)	Stadium: CSKA Stadium; Attendance: 1,000; Referee: Dilovarshoh Orzu

26 October 2015 15	Parvoz	0–8	Istiklol	Ghafurov
15:00 (UTC+5)		Summary	Dzhalilov 3', 33', 55' (pen.); R.Jalilov 38'; Bleda 57'; Fuzaylov 66'; Sharipov 79'; Umarbayev 90'	Stadium: Furudgoh; Attendance: 200; Referee: Bahram Sadulloev

5 November 2015 16	Ravshan	1–1	Istiklol	Kulob
14:30 (UTC+5)	Fuzaylov 6'	Summary	Sohrabi 49'	Stadium: Kulob Central Stadium; Attendance: 9,000; Referee: Bahram Sadulloev

17 November 2015 17	Istiklol	3–1	Barki Tajik	Dushanbe
14:00 (UTC+5)	Fuzaylov 48' (o.g.); Bleda 80'; Dzhalilov 90+1' (pen.)	Summary	Kurbanov 86'; Rakhmatov (yellow card); Fuzaylov (yellow card)	Stadium: Republican Stadium; Attendance: 500; Referee: Sayëdzhon Zayniddinov

22 November 2015 18	Khujand	1–7	Istiklol	Khujand
14:00 (UTC+5)	Tokhirov 44' (pen.)	Summary	Vasiev 18'; Dzhalilov 24', 47', 65'; Bleda 26', 61'; Fatkhuloev 37'	Stadium: 20 Years of Independence Stadium; Attendance: 1,200; Referee: Azam Buriev

==== League table ====
Pos	Team	Pld	W	D	L	GF	GA	GD	Pts	Qualification or relegation
1	Istiklol (C, Q)	18	16	2	0	69	5	+64	50	2016 AFC Cup (Note: Istiklol won the 2015 Tajik Cup and therefore FK Khujand took the second 2016 AFC Cup spot)
2	FK Khujand (Q)	18	12	3	3	34	21	+13	39	2016 AFC Cup
3	Ravshan Kulob	18	10	4	4	37	26	+11	34	
4	Regar-TadAZ	18	9	6	3	31	14	+17	33	
5	Khayr Vahdat FK	18	8	5	5	21	26	−5	29	
6	CSKA Pomir Dushanbe	18	8	2	8	18	22	−4	26	
7	Barki Tajik	18	4	2	12	17	32	−15	14	
8	Vakhsh	18	3	4	11	11	34	−23	13	
9	FK Daleron-Uroteppa	18	3	3	12	16	36	−20	12	
10	Parvoz	18	1	1	16	6	44	−38	4	

Updated to match(es) played on 22 November 2015. Source: Fifa
Rules for classification: 1) points; 2) goal difference; 3) number of goals scored.
(C) Champions; (Q) Qualified for the phase indicated

=== Tajik Cup ===
25 July 2015 Last 16 1st leg	Istiklol	5–0	Parvoz	Dushanbe
(UTC+5)	Umarbayev 8'; Nazarov 16' (pen.); Fatkhuloev 58', 90+1'; Dzhalilov 69' (yellow card); Kovalchuk (yellow card)	Summary	S. Abdulloev (yellow card); A.Yusupov (yellow card); S.Toshmatov (yellow card)	Stadium: Republican Stadium; Attendance: 200; Referee: Shavkat Akhmedov

5 August 2015 Last 16 2nd leg	Parvoz	1–3 (1–8 agg.)	Istiklol	Ghafurov
(UTC+5)	Zokirov 44' (yellow card); Yusupov (yellow card)	Summary	Vasiev 4'; Safarov 5'; Dzhalilov 54'; J.Ballester (yellow card); Fuzaylov (yellow card)	Stadium: Furudgoh Stadium; Attendance: 300; Referee: Hurshed Dadoboev

12 August 2015 Quarterfinal 1st leg	Istiklol	6–1	Khujand	Dushanbe
17:00 (UTC+5)	Fatkhuloev (yellow card) 8' (goal) 31', 36'; Vasiev 44', 69'; Dzhalilov 74'; Jalilov 86'	Summary	Khamrakulov 13'; Choriev (yellow card) 28'; Akhmedov (yellow card) 60' (yellow-red card) 60'	Stadium: Republican Stadium; Referee: Sayëdzhon Zayniddinov

19 August 2015 Quarterfinal 2nd leg	Khujand	0–0 (1–6 agg.)	Istiklol	Khujand
16:30 (UTC+5)		Summary	J.Ballester (yellow card) 64'; Jalilov (yellow card) 83'	Stadium: 20 Years of Independence Stadium

22 September 2015 Semifinal 1st leg	Istiklol	7–0	Ravshan Kulob	Dushanbe
16:00 (UTC+5)	Makhmudov 7'; Vasiev 15'; Fatkhuloev 39'; Nazarov 45'; Asrorov 58'; Safarov (yellow card) 60'; Umarbayev 63'; Jalilov (yellow card) 73'; Dzhalilov 80'	Summary	Awuku (yellow card) 12' (yellow-red card) 71'; B.Qalandarov (yellow card) 53'; S.Saydahmad (yellow card) 55'; S.Amrohon (yellow card) 62'	Stadium: Republican Stadium; Attendance: 2,000; Referee: Dilovar Orzu

25 September 2015 Semifinal 2nd leg	Ravshan Kulob	0–3 (0–10 agg.)	Istiklol	Kulob
(UTC+5)	Rustamov (yellow card); A.Rakhmonov (yellow card); B.Qalandarov (yellow card)	Summary	Fuzaylov 20' (yellow card); Ballester 41'; Nazarov 90+2'; Sharipov (yellow card)	Stadium: Kulob Central Stadium; Attendance: 7,000; Referee: Sayëdzhon Zayniddinov

==== Final ====
28 November 2015	Istiklol	2–2 (6–5 p)	Regar-TadAZ	Dushanbe
14:00 (UTC+5)	J.Jalilov (yellow card) 4'; Davronov (yellow card) 30' (goal) 104'; Vasiev (yellow card) 45+2' (goal) 96'; Fuzaylov (yellow card) 74'; Bleda (yellow card) 90+1'	Summary	Karaev (yellow card) 3' (goal) 104'; Bobomurodov (yellow card) 26'; Bobojonov 114'	Stadium: Central Republican Stadium; Attendance: 3,500; Referee: Dilovarshoh Orzu
	Penalties
	Nazarov (penalty scored); Umarbayev (penalty scored); Fatkhuloev (penalty missed); Davronov (penalty scored); Ballester (penalty scored); Bleda (penalty scored); Vasiev (penalty scored)		(penalty scored) Bobojonov; (penalty missed) Karaev; (penalty scored) Tursunov; (penalty scored) Sharipov; (penalty scored) Holbeck; (penalty scored) Abdugaffor; (penalty missed) Asimov

=== AFC Cup ===
==== Group stage ====
Pos	Team	Pld	W	D	L	GF	GA	GD	Pts	Qualification
1	(Tajikistan) Istiklol	6	3	2	1	12	8	+4	11	Advance to knockout stage
2	(Kuwait) Al-Qadsia	6	3	1	2	7	6	+1	10	Advance to knockout stage
3	(Iraq) Erbil	6	2	1	3	8	8	0	7	
4	(Turkmenistan) Ahal	6	2	0	4	8	13	−5	6	

Source: AFC

25 February 2015 1	Istiklol (Tajikistan)	1–3	(Iraq) Erbil	Dushanbe, Tajikistan
14:00 (UTC+5)	J.Jalilov (yellow card) 13'; Nadhim 60' (o.g.); Davronov (yellow card) 75'	Summary	Hussein 35'; Nad.Sabah (yellow card) 48'; Nab.Sabah 66'; Abdul-Amir (yellow card) 67'; Salah 78'	Stadium: Republican Stadium; Attendance: 12,000; Referee: Ilgiz Tantashev (Uzbekistan)

11 March 2015 2	Ahal (Turkmenistan)	1–2	(Tajikistan) Istiklol	Ashgabat, Turkmenistan
17:00 (UTC+5)	Orazow 28' (pen.); Garadanow (yellow card) 36'; Babajanow (yellow card) 90'	Summary	Fatkhuloev 4'; J.Jalilov (yellow card) 31'; Makhmudov 66'; Bleda (yellow card) 67'	Stadium: Ashgabat Stadium; Attendance: 14,000; Referee: Khamis Mohamed Al-Kuwari

18 March 2015 3	Qadsia (Kuwait)	2–2	(Tajikistan) Istiklol	Hawally, Kuwait
20:40 (UTC+5)	Al-Mutawa 3' (pen.), 54' (pen.)	Summary	Vasiev (yellow card) 8' (goal) 45+1'; Dzahlilov 36'; Bleda (yellow card) 78'; Sharipov (yellow card) 90'	Stadium: Mohammed Al-Hamad Stadium; Attendance: 475; Referee: Mohammad Mousa (Jordan)

15 April 2015 4	Istiklol (Tajikistan)	2–0	(Kuwait) Qadsia	Dushanbe, Tajikistan
18:00 (UTC+5)	Asrorov (yellow card) 34'; Davronov 53' (pen.); Dzhalilov 63'	Report		Stadium: Republican Stadium; Attendance: 15,000; Referee: Pratap Singh (India)

28 April 2015 5	Erbil (Iraq)	0–0	(Tajikistan) Istiklol	Doha, Qatar
21:00 (UTC+5)		Summary	Vasiev (yellow card) 29'; Chahjouyi (yellow card) 39'	Stadium: Abdullah bin Khalifa Stadium; Attendance: 200; Referee: Masoud Tufayelieh (Syria)

13 May 2015 6	Istiklol (Tajikistan)	5–2	(Turkmenistan) Ahal	Dushanbe, Tajikistan
20:45 (UTC+5)	Dzhalilov 9', 90+1'; Fatkhuloev (yellow card) 12'; Nazarov (yellow card) 16'; Makhmudov 28'; Bleda 31'; Şermetow 53' (o.g.); Kovalchuk (yellow card) 76'; Stošić (yellow card) 79'	Summary	Garadanow 32'; Balkaýew (yellow card) 41'; Orazow (yellow card) 57'; Annadurdyýew 90+3'	Stadium: Republican Stadium; Referee: Tayeb Shamsuzzaman (Bangladesh)

==== Knock-out stage ====
26 May 2015 Round of 16	Istiklol (Tajikistan)	1–1 (a.e.t.) (4–2 p)	(Syria) Al-Wahda	Dushanbe, Tajikistan
20:00 (UTC+5)	Al Kurdi 35' (o.g.); Chahjouyi (yellow card) 62'; Davronov (yellow card) 86'; Umarbayev (yellow card) 109'	Summary	Al Kurdi 21'	Stadium: Republican Stadium; Attendance: 17,100; Referee: Jumpei Iida (Japan)
	Penalties
	Davronov (penalty scored); Nazarov (penalty scored); Fatkhuloev (penalty scored); Umarbayev (penalty scored)		Omari (penalty missed); Kataya (penalty scored); Hamdoko (penalty scored); Khadouj (penalty missed)

26 August 2015 Quarterfinal 1st leg	Istiklol (Tajikistan)	4–0	(Malaysia) Pahang	Dushanbe, Tajikistan
20:00 (UTC+5)	Chahjouyi 35'; Vasiev 36', 77'; Makhmudov 51'	Summary	Stewart (yellow card) 41'; Kamal (yellow card) 64'; Fauzi (yellow card) 74'	Stadium: Republican Stadium; Attendance: 15,000; Referee: Adham Makhadmeh (Jordan)

16 September 2015 Quarterfinal 2nd leg	Pahang (Malaysia)	3–1 (3–5 agg.)	(Tajikistan) Istiklol	Kuantan, Malaysia
17:45 (UTC+5)	Kamal 31', 58' (yellow card) 40'; Nwakaeme (yellow card) 45+2'; Miswan (red card) 45+2'; Saarvindran 90+2'	Summary	Vasiev (yellow card) 47'; Makhmudov 61'	Stadium: Darul Makmur Stadium; Attendance: 1,309; Referee: Abdullah Al Hilali (Oman)

30 September 2015 Semifinal 1st leg	Al-Kuwait	4–0	(Tajikistan) Istiklol	Kuwait City, Kuwait
21:20 (UTC+5)	Vinícius 40', 80' (pen.), 86' (pen.); Alhajeri (yellow card) 78'; Al Harbi 90+2'	Report	Fatkhuloev (yellow card) 66'	Stadium: Al Kuwait Sports Club Stadium; Attendance: 350; Referee: Mohsen Torky (Iran)

21 October 2015 Semifinal 2nd leg	Istiklol (Tajikistan)	w/o (5–4 agg.)	Al-Kuwait	Dushanbe, Tajikistan
(UTC+5)		[ Summary]		Stadium: Republican Stadium

==== Final ====
31 October 2015	Istiklol (Tajikistan)	0–1	(Malaysia) Johor Darul Ta'zim	Dushanbe, Tajikistan
17:00 (UTC+5)	Asrorov (yellow card) 77'	Report	Velázquez 23' (yellow card) 51'; Sali (yellow card) 53'; Farizal (yellow card) 54'; Robbat (yellow card) 90+5'	Stadium: Republican Stadium; Attendance: 18,000; Referee: Minoru Tōjō (Japan)

== Squad statistics ==
As of match played 28 November 2015

=== Appearances and goals ===
No.	Pos	Nat	Player	Total		Tajik League		Tajik Cup		Tajik Supercup		AFC Cup	
No.	Pos	Nat	Player	Apps	Goals	Apps	Goals	Apps	Goals	Apps	Goals	Apps	Goals
1	GK	(Serbia) SRB	Nikola Stošić	20	0	8	0	1	0	1	0	10	0
2	DF	(Tajikistan) TJK	Siyovush Asrorov	27	3	10+1	2	4+1	1	0	0	11	0
3	DF	(Tajikistan) TJK	Sokhib Suvonkulov	6	1	4	1	0	0	1	0	0+1	0
4	DF	(Tajikistan) TJK	Eraj Rajabov	19	0	7+2	0	4	0	0	0	2+4	0
6	DF	(Spain) ESP	José Ballester	22	2	12+3	1	5+1	1	1	0	0	0
7	MF	(Tajikistan) TJK	Umedzhon Sharipov	20	3	8+2	3	1+3	0	0+1	0	0+5	0
8	MF	(Tajikistan) TJK	Nuriddin Davronov	28	3	12	1	4	1	1	0	11	1
9	MF	(Tajikistan) TJK	Khurshed Makhmudov	30	9	8+6	3	4	1	1	1	11	4
10	FW	(Spain) ESP	Manolo Bleda	31	8	11+3	7	3+3	0	1	0	10	1
11	MF	(Tajikistan) TJK	Jakhongir Jalilov	26	0	8+2	0	4+1	0	1	0	10	0
12	FW	(Tajikistan) TJK	Amirdzhon Safarov	6	1	1+1	0	2+2	1	0	0	0	0
15	DF	(Ukraine) UKR	Petro Kovalchuk	35	0	16	0	7	0	1	0	11	0
16	GK	(Tajikistan) TJK	Alisher Tuychiev	16	0	9+1	0	5	0	0	0	1	0
17	FW	(Tajikistan) TJK	Dilshod Vasiev	29	14	8+5	6	6	5	0	0	10	3
18	MF	(Tajikistan) TJK	Fatkhullo Fatkhuloev	32	16	11+3	9	5+1	5	1	1	11	1
19	DF	(Tajikistan) TJK	Akhtam Nazarov	31	4	11+3	1	5+1	3	1	0	4+6	0
20	DF	(Tajikistan) TJK	Ziёvuddin Fuzaylov	21	5	14+1	4	5+1	1	0	0	0	0
21	MF	(Tajikistan) TJK	Romish Jalilov	21	4	7+7	3	2+4	1	0	0	0+1	0
22	DF	(Iran) IRI	Mehdi Chahjouyi	26	2	11+1	1	2+1	0	0+1	0	9+1	1
35	GK	(Tajikistan) TJK	Kurban Boboev	3	0	1+1	0	1	0	0	0	0	0
39	MF	(Tajikistan) TJK	Parvizdzhon Umarbayev	32	5	7+6	3	5+2	2	0+1	0	0+11	0
63	MF	(Tajikistan) TJK	Manuchekhr Dzhalilov	30	30	11+2	22	3+3	4	0	0	10+1	4
	FW	(Tajikistan) TJK	Sheriddin Boboev	1	0	0+1	0	0	0	0	0	0	0
Players away from Istiklol on loan:
5	MF	(Tajikistan) TJK	Alisher Safarov	5	0	3+1	0	0	0	1	0	0	0
12	FW	(Tajikistan) TJK	Dzhakhongir Ergashev	1	0	0	0	0	0	0	0	0+1	0
Players who left Istiklol during the season:

=== Goal scorers ===
Place	Position	Nation	Number	Name	Tajik League	Tajik Cup	Tajik Supercup	AFC Cup	Total
1	MF	(Tajikistan)	63	Manuchekhr Dzhalilov	22	4	0	4	30
2	MF	(Tajikistan)	18	Fatkhullo Fatkhuloev	9	5	1	1	16
3	FW	(Tajikistan)	17	Dilshod Vasiev	6	5	0	3	14
4	MF	(Tajikistan)	9	Khurshed Makhmudov	3	1	1	4	9
5	FW	(Spain)	10	Manolo Bleda	7	0	0	1	8
6	DF	(Tajikistan)	20	Ziёvuddin Fuzaylov	4	1	0	0	5
6	MF	(Tajikistan)	39	Parvizdzhon Umarbayev	3	2	0	0	5
6				Own goal	2	0	0	3	5
9	DF	(Tajikistan)	19	Akhtam Nazarov	1	3	0	0	4
9	MF	(Tajikistan)	21	Romish Jalilov	3	1	0	0	4
11	DF	(Tajikistan)	2	Siyovush Asrorov	2	1	0	0	3
11	MF	(Tajikistan)	7	Umedzhon Sharipov	3	0	0	0	3
11	MF	(Tajikistan)	8	Nuriddin Davronov	1	1	0	1	3
14	DF	(Spain)	6	José Ballester	1	1	0	0	2
14	DF	(Iran)	22	Mehdi Chahjouyi	1	0	0	1	2
16	DF	(Tajikistan)	3	Sokhib Suvonkulov	1	0	0	0	1
16	MF	(Tajikistan)	12	Amirdzhon Safarov	0	1	0	0	1
				TOTALS	69	26	2	18	115

=== Disciplinary record ===
Number	Nation	Position	Name	Tajik League		Tajik Cup		Tajik Supercup		AFC Cup		Total	
Number	Nation	Position	Name	Yellow card	Red card	Yellow card	Red card	Yellow card	Red card	Yellow card	Red card	Yellow card	Red card
1	(Serbia)	GK	Nikola Stošić	0	0	0	0	0	0	1	0	1	0
2	(Tajikistan)	DF	Siyovush Asrorov	1	0	0	0	0	0	2	0	3	0
3	(Tajikistan)	DF	Sokhib Suvonkulov	1	0	0	0	0	0	0	0	1	0
4	(Tajikistan)	DF	Eraj Rajabov	2	0	0	0	0	0	0	0	2	0
6	(Spain)	DF	José Ballester	0	0	2	0	0	0	0	0	2	0
7	(Tajikistan)	MF	Umedzhon Sharipov	0	0	1	0	0	0	0	0	1	0
8	(Tajikistan)	MF	Nuriddin Davronov	4	0	1	0	1	0	2	0	8	0
10	(Spain)	FW	Manolo Bleda	0	0	1	0	0	0	2	0	3	0
11	(Tajikistan)	MF	Jakhongir Jalilov	0	0	2	0	0	0	2	0	4	0
12	(Tajikistan)	FW	Amirdzhon Safarov	0	0	1	0	0	0	0	0	1	0
15	(Ukraine)	DF	Petro Kovalchuk	2	0	1	0	1	0	1	0	5	0
17	(Tajikistan)	FW	Dilshod Vasiev	1	0	1	0	0	0	3	0	5	0
18	(Tajikistan)	MF	Fatkhullo Fatkhuloev	0	0	1	0	1	0	2	0	4	0
19	(Tajikistan)	DF	Akhtam Nazarov	0	0	0	0	0	0	1	0	1	0
20	(Tajikistan)	DF	Ziёvuddin Fuzaylov	1	0	3	0	0	0	0	0	4	0
21	(Tajikistan)	MF	Romish Jalilov	2	0	1	0	0	0	0	0	3	0
22	(Iran)	DF	Mehdi Chahjouyi	1	0	0	0	0	0	2	0	3	0
39	(Tajikistan)	MF	Parvizdzhon Umarbayev	1	0	0	0	0	0	1	0	2	0
63	(Tajikistan)	MF	Manuchekhr Dzhalilov	0	0	1	0	0	0	0	0	1	0
			TOTALS	16	0	16	0	3	0	21	0	52	0

== See also ==
- List of unbeaten football club seasons

== Notes ==
1. Teams from Iraq are not allowed to host their home matches in their country due to security concerns.
