= Kuhsor =

- Location in Tajikistan
- Coordinates: 40°32′N 69°32′E
- Country: Tajikistan
- Region: Sughd Region
- District: Ghafurov District

Kuhsor (Tajik: Кӯҳсор, formerly Dzhingilik) is a village in Sughd Region, northern Tajikistan. It is part of the jamoat Chashmasor in Ghafurov District.
