= Pakhtakor =

Pakhtakor may refer to:

- FC Pakhtakor Tashkent - an Uzbek football club
- Paxtakor - a city in Uzbekistan

Several places in Tajikistan:

- Pakhtakor, Sughd
- Pakhtakor, Khatlon
