= Kataghan =

Kataghan, Katagan, and Qataghan may refer to:

- Katagan, a town in Tajikistan.
- Qataghan Province, a former province in Afghanistan.
- Qataghan-Badakhshan Province, a former province in Afghanistan.
