= Dashti Amin =

- Location in Tajikistan
- Coordinates: 40°12′N 69°40′E
- Country: Tajikistan
- Region: Sughd Region
- District: Ghafurov District

Dashti Amin (Tajik: Дашти Амин) is a village in Sughd Region, northern Tajikistan. It is part of the jamoat Isfisor in Ghafurov District.
