= Qal'acha =

Qal'acha Қалъача
- Location in Tajikistan
- Coordinates: 40°7′35″N 69°40′16″E
- Country: Tajikistan
- Region: Sughd Region
- District: Ghafurov District
- Official languages: Russian (Interethnic); Tajik (State) (Note: Constitution of Tajikistan)

Qal'acha (Russian: Калача; Tajik: Қалъача) is a village in Sughd Region, northern Tajikistan. It is part of the jamoat Ovchi Kalacha in Ghafurov District.
