= Shamsobod =

Shamsobod Russian: Шамсабад Tajik: Шамсобод
- Location in Tajikistan
- Coordinates: 40°20′13″N 69°51′3″E
- Country: Tajikistan
- Region: Sughd Region
- District: Ghafurov District
- Official languages: Russian (Interethnic); Tajik (State)

Shamsobod (Russian: Шамсабад; Tajik: Шамсобод, formerly: Yangikishlak) is a village in Sughd Region, northern Tajikistan. It is part of the jamoat Ismoil in Ghafurov District.
