= Unji (disambiguation) =

Unji or Undzhi is a town in north-west Tajikistan.

Unji may also refer to:

- Trametes versicolor or Unji mushroom
- Unji Godam, an ancient village in Azamgarh
