= Isfisor =

Isfisor Исфисор
- Village and Jamoat
- Location in Tajikistan
- Coordinates: 40°14′36″N 69°44′41″E
- Country: Tajikistan
- Region: Sughd Region
- District: Ghafurov District

Population (2015)
  - Total: 39,590
- Time zone: UTC+5 (TJT)

Isfisor (Tajik: Исфисор; also Isfisar, Ispisor, Ispisar) is a village and jamoat in north-west Tajikistan. It is located in Ghafurov District in Sughd Region. The jamoat has a total population of 39,590 (2015). It consists of 6 villages, including Isfisor (the seat) and Dashti Amin.
