= Ismoil =

- Jamoat
- Ismoil location in Ghafurov District in Sughd Region

- Location in Tajikistan
- Coordinates: 40°21′N 69°52′E
- Country: Tajikistan
- Region: Sughd Region
- District: Ghafurov District

Population (2015)
  - Total: 19,844
- Time zone: UTC+5 (TJT)

Ismoil is a jamoat in north-west Tajikistan. It is located in Ghafurov District in Sughd Region. The jamoat has a total population of 19,844 (2015). It consists of 18 villages, including Shamsobod.
