= Haidar Usmonov =

- Jamoat
- Location in Tajikistan
- Coordinates: 40°17′N 69°40′E
- Country: Tajikistan
- Region: Sughd Region
- District: Ghafurov District

Population (2015)
  - Total: 37,017
- Time zone: UTC+5 (TJT)

Location of Bobojon Ghafurov District in Tajikistan

Haidar Usmonov is a jamoat in north-west Tajikistan. It is located in Ghafurov District in Sughd Region. The jamoat has a total population of 37,017 (2015).
