= Parvizdzhon Umarbayev =

Tajik-Russian footballer

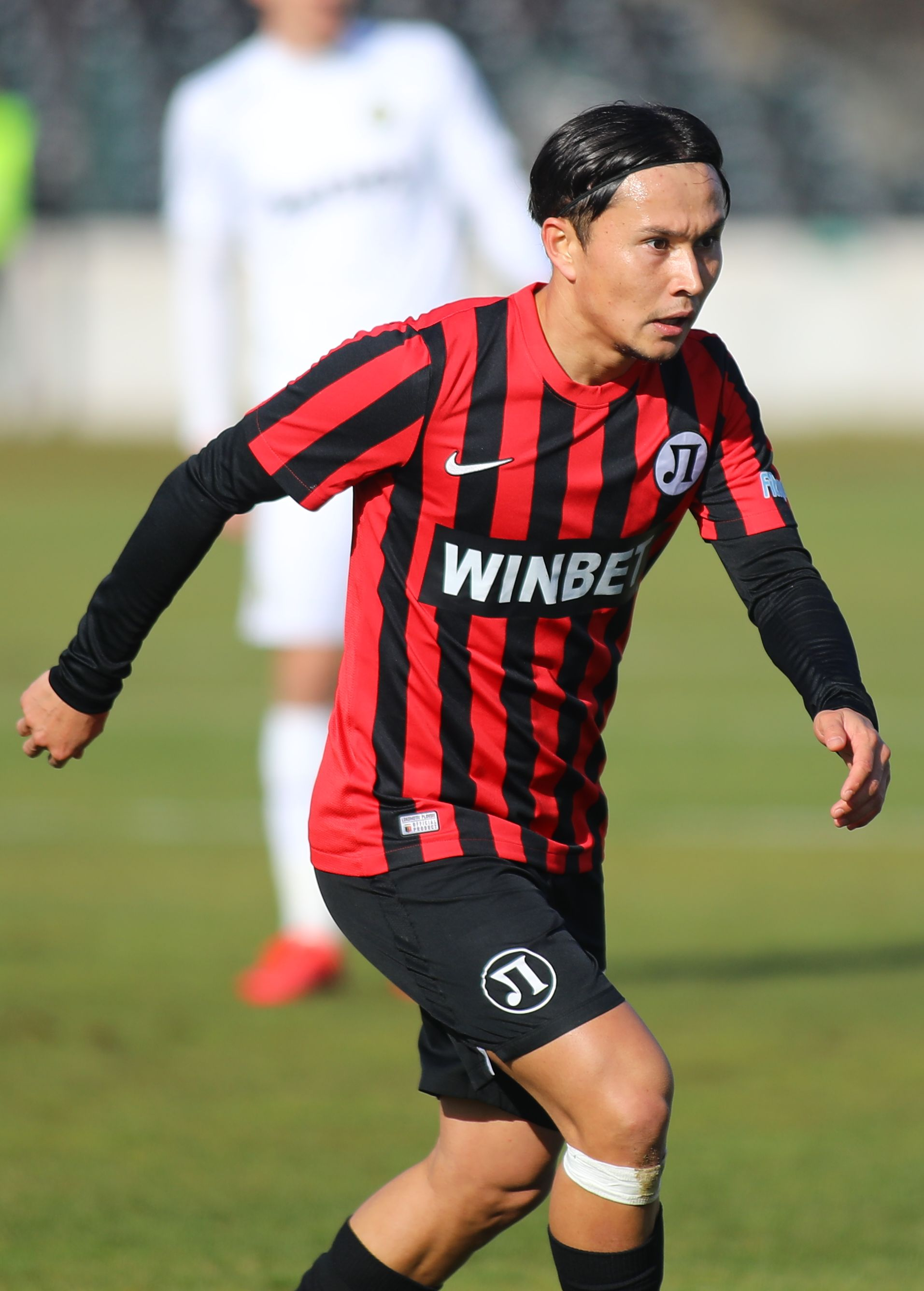
- Umarbayev with Lokomotiv Plovdiv in 2021

Personal information
- Full name: Parvizdzhon Abdulloyevich Umarbayev
- Date of birth: 1 November 1994 (age 32)
- Place of birth: Khujand, Tajikistan
- Height: 1.73 m (5 ft 8 in)
- Position: Attacking midfielder

Team information
- Current team: Lokomotiv Plovdiv
- Number: 39

Youth career
- –2008: Regar-TadAZ
- 2009–2012: Rubin Kazan

Senior career*
Years	Team	Apps	(Gls)
2012–2014	Rubin Kazan	0	(0)
2013–2014	→ Neftekhimik (loan)	19	(1)
2014	Khimik Dzerzhinsk	9	(1)
2015–2016	Istiklol	19	(5)
2016–2022	Lokomotiv Plovdiv	176	(10)
2022–2025	CSKA 1948	63	(6)
2024	CSKA 1948 II	1	(0)
2025	→ Lokomotiv Plovdiv (loan)	16	(2)
2025–	Lokomotiv Plovdiv	30	(2)

International career^{‡}
2012	Russia U18	1	(0)
2015–2018	Tajikistan U23	3	(1)
2015–	Tajikistan	61	(10)
- * Club domestic league appearances and goals as of 11:26, 31 May 2026 (UTC) ‡ National team caps and goals as of 20 June 2024

Parvizdzhon Abdulloyevich Umarbayev (Tajik: Парвизҷон Умарбоев; born 1 November 1994) is a Tajik professional footballer who plays as a midfielder for Bulgarian First League club Lokomotiv Plovdiv and the Tajikistan national team. He also holds a Russian citizenship.

== Club career ==
=== Rubin Kazan ===
On 26 September 2012, Umarbayev made his debut for Rubin Kazan in their 2012–13 Russian Cup game against Yenisey Krasnoyarsk.

=== Istiklol ===
In March 2015, Umarbayev signed for Tajik League champions Istiklol.

=== Lokomotiv Plovdiv ===
In June 2016, Umarbayev moved to Bulgarian First League side, Lokomotiv Plovdiv on a two-year contract. He left the team after 6 seasons becoming one of the most capped foreign players for the club.

=== CSKA 1948 ===
After several months of speculations, on 23 July 2022 Umarbayev officially signed a contract with CSKA 1948.

==== Lokomotiv Plovdiv ====
On 20 January 2025, Lokomotiv Plovdiv announced the return of Umarbayev on loan from CSKA 1948 for the remainder of the season. At the end of the season, he was permanently signed by the Plovdiv club.

== International career ==
Being born in Tajikistan and holding Russian citizenship, Umarbayev was eligible to play for either Tajikistan or Russia. In 2012, he was called up to the youth team of Russia.

In 2015, he was called up to the youth team of Tajikistan. He made his debut on 27 March in a match against Yemen. On 31 March 2015, he scored his first goal in a match against Sri Lanka which ended 5–1 to Tajikistan.

In May 2015, he was called up to the Tajikistan national football team.

In October 2023, Umarbayev captained the Tajikistan side to win the 2023 Merdeka Tournament in Kuala Lumpur.

== Career statistics ==
=== Club ===
As of match played 16 December 2024

Club	Season	League			National Cup		Continental		Other		Total	
Club	Season	Division	Apps	Goals	Apps	Goals	Apps	Goals	Apps	Goals	Apps	Goals
Rubin Kazan	2011–12	Russian Premier League	0	0	0	0	0	0	-		0	0
Rubin Kazan	2012–13	Russian Premier League	0	0	1	0	-		-		1	0
Rubin Kazan	Total		0	0	1	0	0	0	0	0	1	0
Neftekhimik Nizhnekamsk (loan)	2012–13	Russian FNL	6	0	0	0	-		-		6	0
Neftekhimik Nizhnekamsk (loan)	2013–14	Russian FNL	13	1	2	0	-		-		15	1
Neftekhimik Nizhnekamsk (loan)	Total		19	1	2	0	0	0	0	0	21	1
Khimik Dzerzhinsk	2014–15	Russian FNL	9	1	2	0	-		-		11	1
Istiklol	2015	Tajik League	13	3	6	2	11	0	1	0	31	5
Istiklol	2016	Tajik League	6	2	0	0	5	1	1	0	12	3
Istiklol	Total		19	5	6	2	16	1	2	0	43	8
Lokomotiv Plovdiv	2016–17	First League	33	3	3	0	-		-		36	3
Lokomotiv Plovdiv	2017–18	First League	29	3	2	0	-		-		31	3
Lokomotiv Plovdiv	2018–19	First League	27	1	3	0	-		-		30	1
Lokomotiv Plovdiv	2019–20	First League	26	0	3	0	4	0	1	0	35	0
Lokomotiv Plovdiv	2020–21	First League	31	1	2	1	2	0	1	0	36	2
Lokomotiv Plovdiv	2021–22	First League	30	2	3	0	4	0	0	0	37	2
Lokomotiv Plovdiv	Total		176	10	16	1	10	0	2	0	204	11
CSKA 1948	2022–23	First League	26	4	5	1	-		-		31	5
CSKA 1948	2023–24	First League	25	0	2	0	1	0	-		28	0
CSKA 1948	2024–25	First League	12	2	2	0	3	0	-		17	2
CSKA 1948	Total		63	6	9	1	4	0	0	0	76	7
Career total			286	23	36	4	30	1	4	0	356	28

=== International ===
Tajikistan national team
Year	Apps	Goals
2015	4	0
2016	7	3
2017	6	3
2018	0	0
2019	7	0
2020	1	0
2021	5	0
2022	6	1
2023	9	1
2024	4	1
Total	49	10

Statistics accurate as of match played 28 January 2024

=== International goals ===
Scores and results list Tajikistan's goal tally first.

#	Date	Venue	Opponent	Score	Result	Competition	Ref.
1.	2 June 2016	Pamir Stadium, Dushanbe, Tajikistan	Bangladesh	3–0	5–0	2019 AFC Asian Cup qualification	
2.	6 September 2016	Dora International Stadium, Hebron, Palestine	Palestine	1–0	1–1	Friendly	
3.	5 October 2016	Pamir Stadium, Dushanbe, Tajikistan	Palestine	3–3	3–3	Friendly	
4.	28 March 2017	Suheim Bin Hamad Stadium, Doha, Qatar	Yemen	1–0	1–2	2019 AFC Asian Cup qualification	
5.	13 June 2017	Pamir Stadium, Dushanbe, Tajikistan	Philippines	1–3	3–4	2019 AFC Asian Cup qualification	
6.	10 October 2017	Central Stadium, Hisor, Tajikistan	Nepal	2–0	3–0	2019 AFC Asian Cup qualification	
7.	29 March 2022	Markaziy Stadium, Namangan, Uzbekistan	Kyrgyzstan	1–0	1–0	Friendly	
8.	17 June 2023	Milliy Stadium, Tashkent, Uzbekistan	Uzbekistan	1–0	1–5	2023 CAFA Nations Cup	
9.	21 November 2023	Jinnah Sports Stadium, Islamabad, Pakikistan	Pakistan	3–1	6–1	2026 FIFA World Cup qualification	
10.	22 January 2024	Jassim bin Hamad Stadium, Al Rayyan, Qatar	Lebanon	1–1	2–1	2023 AFC Asian Cup	
11.	10 June 2025	New Clark City Stadium, Capas, Philippines	Philippines	2–1	2–2	2027 AFC Asian Cup qualification	

== Honours ==
Istiklol

- Tajik League: 2015
- Tajik Cup: 2015
- Tajik Supercup: 2015, 2016

Lokomotiv Plovdiv

- Bulgarian Cup: 2018–19, 2019–20
- Bulgarian Supercup: 2020

Tajikistan

- Merdeka Tournament: 2023
