= Yova =

- Village and Jamoat
- Location in Tajikistan
- Coordinates: 40°16′N 69°36′E
- Country: Tajikistan
- Region: Sughd Region
- District: Ghafurov District

Population (2015)
  - Total: 40,297
- Time zone: UTC+5 (TJT)
- Official languages: Russian (Interethnic); Tajik (State)

Yova (Russian and Tajik: Ёва) is a village and jamoat in north-west Tajikistan. It is located in Ghafurov District in Sughd Region. The jamoat has a total population of 40,297 (2015).
