= Khistevarz =

- Village and Jamoat
- Location in Tajikistan
- Coordinates: 40°12′N 69°49′E
- Country: Tajikistan
- Region: Sughd Region
- District: Ghafurov District

Population (2015)
  - Total: 52,758
- Time zone: UTC+5 (TJT)

Khistevarz (Tajik: Хистеварз, formerly Kistakuz or Qistaquz) is a village and jamoat in north-west Tajikistan. It is located in Ghafurov District in Sughd Region. The jamoat has a total population of 52,758 (2015).
