= Ghoziyon =

- Village and Jamoat
- Location in Tajikistan
- Coordinates: 40°15′N 69°38′E
- Country: Tajikistan
- Region: Sughd Region
- District: Ghafurov District

Population
  - Total: 18,760
- Time zone: UTC+5 (TJT)

Ghoziyon is a village and jamoat in north-west Tajikistan. It is located in Ghafurov District in Sughd Region. The jamoat has a total population of 18,760 (2015).
