= Chashmasor, Ghafurov District =

Chashmasor
- Jamoat
- Location in Tajikistan
- Coordinates: 40°26′N 69°36′E
- Country: Tajikistan
- Region: Sughd Region
- District: Ghafurov District

Population (2015)
  - Total: 10,275
- Time zone: UTC+5 (TJT)

Chashmasor (Tajik: Чашмасор, formerly Utkansoy) is a jamoat in north-west Tajikistan. It is located in Ghafurov District in Sughd Region. The jamoat has a total population of 10,275 (2015). It consists of 28 villages, including Mirzorabot (the seat) and Kuhsor.
