= Ovchiqal'acha =

- Jamoat
- Location in Tajikistan
- Coordinates: 40°08′N 69°41′E
- Country: Tajikistan
- Region: Sughd Region
- District: Ghafurov District

Population (2015)
  - Total: 21,585
- Time zone: UTC+5 (TJT)
- Official languages: Russian (Interethnic); Tajik (State) (Note: Constitution of Tajikistan)

Ovchiqal'acha (Russian: Овчикалача; Tajik: Овчиқалъача) is a jamoat in north-west Tajikistan. It is located in Ghafurov District in Sughd Region. The jamoat has a total population of 21,585 (2015). It consists of 9 villages, including Qal'acha (the seat).

== History ==
The jamoat was targeted by Kyrgyzstani shelling and drone strikes during the 2022 Kyrgyzstan-Tajikistan clashes, with the Tajikistani government claiming that Kyrgyzstani drones struck a school and a mosque in the area.
