= Umedzhon Sharipov =

Tajikistani footballer

Personal information
- Full name: Umedzhon Sharipov
- Date of birth: 4 October 1992 (age 34)
- Place of birth: Tajikistan
- Height: 1.70 m (5 ft 7 in)
- Position: Midfielder

Team information
- Current team: Khatlon
- Number: 63

Senior career*
Years	Team	Apps	(Gls)
2010	Vakhsh Qurghonteppa		
2012–2015	Istiklol		
2016	Vakhsh Qurghonteppa		
2017	Mash'al Mubarek	6	(0)
2017	Khujand		
2020–	Khatlon		

International career^{‡}
2013–	Tajikistan	13	(1)
- * Club domestic league appearances and goals as of 12 April 2020 ‡ National team caps and goals as of 13 June 2017

Umedzhon Sharipov (Tajik: Умедҷон Шарипов; born on 4 October 1992) is a Tajikistani footballer who plays for FC Khatlon, and the Tajikistan national football team.

== Career ==
=== Club ===
Sharipov was released by FC Istiklol at the end of the 2015 season.

In January 2017, Sharipov signed a one-year contract with Uzbek League side FK Mash'al Mubarek. On 1 July 2017, Sharipov left Mash'al Mubarek.

On 31 March 2020, Sharipov was listed in FC Khatlon's squad for the 2020 Tajikistan Higher League season.

== Career statistics ==
=== Club ===
As of match played 22 November 2015

Club	Season	League			National Cup		Continental		Other		Total	
Club	Season	Division	Apps	Goals	Apps	Goals	Apps	Goals	Apps	Goals	Apps	Goals
Istiklol	2012	Tajik League					2	1	–		2	1
Istiklol	2013	Tajik League	6	1			–		–		6	1
Istiklol	2014	Tajik League	12	5	6	3	–		0	0	18	8
Istiklol	2015	Tajik League	10	3	4	0	5	0	1	0	20	3
Istiklol	Total		28	9	10	3	7	1	1	0	46	13
Career total			28	9	10	3	7	1	1	0	46	13

=== International ===
Tajikistan national team
Year	Apps	Goals
2013	1	0
2014	1	0
2015	3	0
2016	5	1
2017	3	0
Total	13	1

Statistics accurate as of match played 13 June 2017

=== International goals ===
Scores and results list Tajikistan's goal tally first.

#	Date	Venue	Opponent	Score	Result	Competition	Ref.
1.	2 June 2016	Pamir Stadium, Dushanbe	Bangladesh	5-0	5-0	2019 AFC Asian Cup qualifier	

== Honors ==
Istiklol

- Tajik League (2): 2014, 2015
- Tajik Cup (2): 2013, 2014
- Tajik Supercup (1): 2015
