= Manolo Bleda =

Spanish-born Hong Kong footballer (born 1990)

Manolo Bleda 洛迪古斯
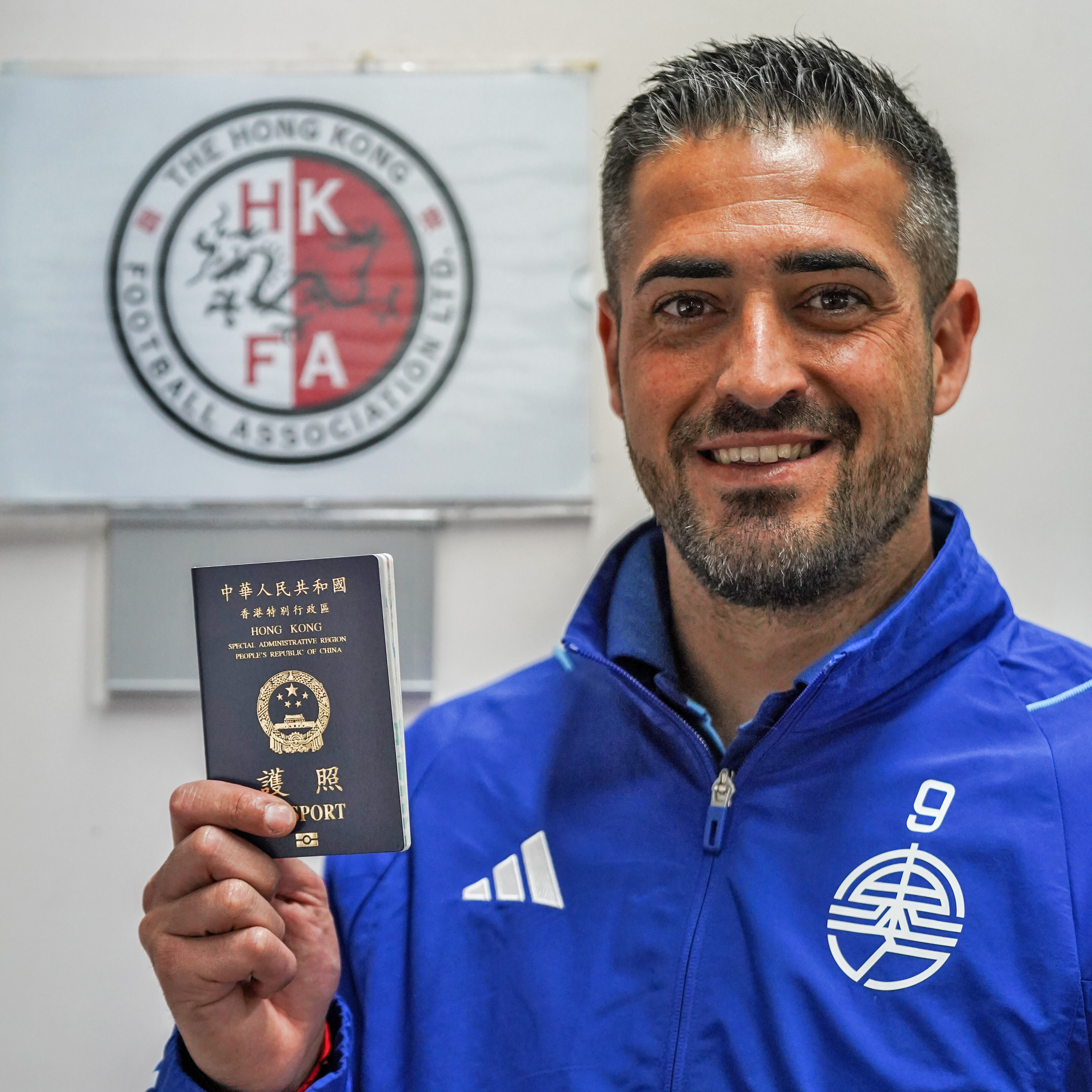

Personal information
- Full name: Manuel Bleda Rodríguez
- Date of birth: 31 July 1990 (age 36)
- Place of birth: Sagunto, Spain
- Height: 1.85 m (6 ft 1 in)
- Position: Striker

Team information
- Current team: HKFC
- Number: 9

Senior career*
Years	Team	Apps	(Gls)
2009–2010	Castellón	5	(0)
2010–2012	Levante B		
2012	Burriana	15	(8)
2013	Catarroja	7	(5)
2013	Alzira	12	(9)
2014	Belshina Bobruisk	19	(7)
2014–2015	Istiklol	20	(9)
2016	Ceahlăul Piatra Neamț	5	(1)
2016–2019	Eastern	43	(33)
2019–2020	Kitchee	9	(4)
2021–2024	Lee Man	22	(11)
2023–2024	→ Eastern (loan)	1	(0)
2025–2026	Eastern	24	(3)
2026–	HKFC	5	(3)

International career^{‡}
2025–	Hong Kong	4	(0)
- * Club domestic league appearances and goals as of 8 November 2026 ‡ National team caps and goals as of 31 March 2026

Manuel Bleda Rodríguez (Spanish pronunciation: [maˈnwel ˈβleða roˈðɾiɣeθ]; (Note: In isolation, Bleda is pronounced [ˈbleða].) Chinese: 洛迪古斯; born 31 July 1990), also known as Manolo Bleda, is a professional footballer who currently plays as a striker for Hong Kong Premier League club HKFC. Born in Spain, he plays for the Hong Kong national team.

== Club career ==
After playing for Alzira, Bleda had a six-month spell with Belshina Bobruisk in Belarus.

In August 2014, Bleda moved from Belshina Bobruisk to Tajik League side FC Istiklol on a contract until November 2014. Bleda scored twice on his competitive debut, Istiklol's 10–0 Tajik Cup victory over Khosilot Farkhor. Bleda scored on his league debut for Istiklol after 16 minutes versus Parvoz on 16 October 2014. On 22 November 2015, Bleda scored Istiklol's 500th league goal. He was also a part of the starting XI in the 2015 AFC Cup final, in which Istiklol lost 0–1 to Johor Darul Ta'zim F.C. Bleda left Istiklol at the end of the 2015 season after his contract was not renewed.

At the start of March 2016, Bleda signed for Romanian Liga II side Ceahlăul Piatra Neamț.

Due to an alleged salary dispute, on 23 August 2016, Bleda left Ceahlăul and signed for Hong Kong Premier League club Eastern. He made his Eastern debut on 16 September 2016 in the Hong Kong Community Cup, scoring a goal in a 3–1 victory over Kitchee SC. In the 2017 AFC Champions League Group G match on 1 March 2017, Bleda converted a penalty against visitors Kawasaki Frontale, which goes down as the first goal for any Hong Kong side in a top-level continental competition. Domestically, he tallied 16 goals in his first HKPL season, which included a four-goal appearance against Biu Chun Glory Sky.

Bleda's impact was limited by injuries in the 2017–18 season, and was not offered a contract extension by Eastern after the season.

On 3 July 2019, Kitchee announced the addition of Bleda. On 20 October 2020, Kitchee head coach Chu Chi Kwong stated that Bleda had unilaterally terminated his contract with the club. However, two weeks later, Chu stated that the club were still locked in a dispute with Bleda over his contract and Kitchee may resort to legal action.

On 12 March 2021, Bleda signed with another HKPL club Lee Man and was given the number 9 shirt.

On 7 July 2023, Bleda returned to Eastern on loan for a season, but only managed one appearance as a loanee at Eastern before being released by Lee Man after the 23–24 season ended.

On 20 March 2025, Bleda rejoined Eastern for a third stint with the club. In his first match back with the team on 22 March 2025, he recorded an assist in a Sapling Cup fixture in a 1–1 draw with Kitchee, which propelled Eastern into the semi-finals of the competition.

On 21 August 2026, Bleda joined HKFC.

== International career ==
On 16 February 2024, it was announced that Bleda had received his HKSAR passport after giving up his Spanish passport, making him eligible to represent Hong Kong internationally.

On 5 June 2025, Bleda made his international debut for Hong Kong in a friendly match against Nepal.

== Career statistics ==
=== Club ===
As of match played 1 June 2024

Appearances and goals by club, season and competition
Club	Season	League			National cup		Continental		Other		Total	
Club	Season	Division	Apps	Goals	Apps	Goals	Apps	Goals	Apps	Goals	Apps	Goals
Belshina Bobruisk	2014	Belarusian Premier League	19	7	3	1	–		–		22	8
Istiklol	2014	Tajik League	6	2	3	5	–		–		9	7
Istiklol	2015	Tajik League	14	7	6	0	10	1	1	0	31	8
Istiklol	Total		20	9	9	5	10	1	1	0	40	15
Ceahlăul Piatra Neamț	2015–16	Liga II	5	1	0	0	–		–		5	1
Eastern	2016–17	Hong Kong Premier League	17	16	1	0	5	1	3	0	26	17
Eastern	2017–18	Hong Kong Premier League	10	5	1	0	0	0	6	4	17	9
Eastern	2018–19	Hong Kong Premier League	16	12	1	0	1	1	3	2	21	15
Eastern	Total		43	33	3	0	6	2	12	6	64	41
Kitchee	2019–20	Hong Kong Premier League	9	4	1	0	0	0	7	5	17	9
Lee Man	2020–21	Hong Kong Premier League	9	3	0	0	–		–		9	3
Lee Man	2021–22	Hong Kong Premier League	2	1	1	0	–		5	2	8	3
Lee Man	2022–23	Hong Kong Premier League	11	7	0	0	1	0	7	3	19	10
Lee Man	Total		22	11	1	0	1	0	12	5	36	16
Eastern	2023–24	Hong Kong Premier League	1	0	0	0	0	0	1	0	2	0
Career total			119	62	17	6	17	3	33	16	186	90

=== International ===
As of 31 March 2026

National team	Year	Apps	Goals
Hong Kong	2025	3	0
Hong Kong	2026	1	0
Total		4	0

== Honours ==
Istiklol

- Tajik League: 2014, 2015
- Tajik Cup: 2014, 2015
- Tajik Supercup: 2015

Kitchee

- Hong Kong Premier League: 2019–20
- Hong Kong Sapling Cup: 2019–20

Eastern

- Hong Kong FA Cup: 2023–24, 2024–25
- Hong Kong Top Footballers (Best XI): 2016–17
