= Faridoon Sharipov =

Tajikistani footballer

Personal information
- Date of birth: 8 September 1994 (age 32)
- Height: 1.86 m (6 ft 1 in)
- Position: Midfielder

Team information
- Current team: Barki Tajik

Senior career*
Years	Team	Apps	(Gls)
–2015	Regar-TadAZ		
2016–2017	Istiklol	25	(0)
2017–	Barki Tajik		

International career^{‡}
2014–	Tajikistan U21	11	(0)
2015–	Tajikistan	5	(0)
- * Club domestic league appearances and goals as of 19:31, 29 June 2017 (UTC) ‡ National team caps and goals as of 08:36, 10 November 2016 (UTC)

Faridoon Sharipov (born 8 September 1994) is a Tajikistani professional football player who currently plays for Barki Tajik.

== Career ==
=== Club ===
In January 2016, Sharipov signed for FC Istiklol from Regar-TadAZ. In August 2017, Sharipov terminated his contract with Istiklol by mutual consent, going on to sign for Barki Tajik.

=== International ===
Sharipov made his senior team debut on 8 October 2015 against Kyrgyzstan.

== Career statistics ==
=== Club ===
As of match played 29 June 2017

Club	Season	League			National Cup		Continental		Other		Total	
Club	Season	Division	Apps	Goals	Apps	Goals	Apps	Goals	Apps	Goals	Apps	Goals
Istiklol	2016	Tajik League	17	0	7	2	3	0	1	0	28	2
Istiklol	2017	Tajik League	8	0	0	0	0	0	0	0	8	0
Istiklol	Total		25	0	7	2	3	0	1	0	36	2
Career total			25	0	7	2	3	0	1	0	36	2

=== International ===
Tajikistan national team
Year	Apps	Goals
2015	2	0
2016	3	0
Total	5	0

Statistics accurate as of match played 9 November 2016

== Honours ==
=== Club ===
Istiklol

- Tajik League (1): 2016
- Tajik Cup (1): 2016
- Tajik Super Cup (1): 2016
