= Oleksandr Kablash =

Ukrainian footballer

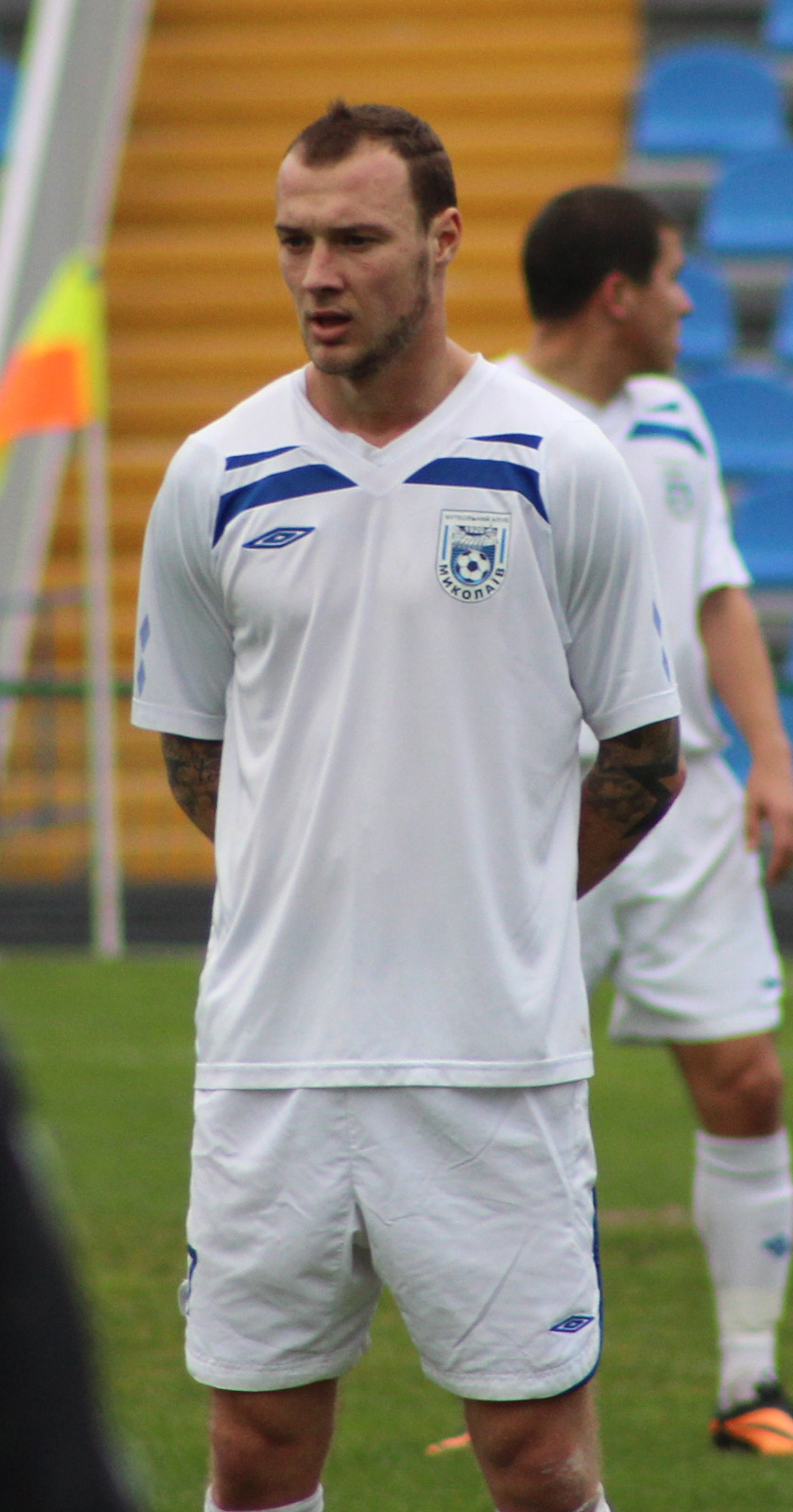

Personal information
- Full name: Oleksandr Hennadiyovych Kablash
- Date of birth: 5 September 1989 (age 37)
- Place of birth: Odesa, Ukrainian SSR
- Height: 1.84 m (6 ft 0 in)
- Position: Midfielder

Youth career
- 2002–2006: Chornomorets Odesa

Senior career*
Years	Team	Apps	(Gls)
2006	Police Sports Club Odesa		
2007–2008	Chornomorets Odesa	1	(0)
2007	→ Illichivets Mariupol (loan)	7	(0)
2008–2010	Dnister Ovidiopol	29	(7)
2010	Ekranas	9	(0)
2011	Tavriya Simferopol	5	(1)
2011	→ Bukovyna Chernivtsi (loan)	3	(0)
2012	Odesa	5	(1)
2013	Mykolaiv	28	(7)
2014	Helios Kharkiv	4	(0)
2014	Sogdiana Jizzakh	12	(4)
2015	Nasaf	3	(2)
2016	Istiklol	3	(0)
2016–2017	Dacia Chișinău	26	(5)

International career^{‡}
2005	Ukraine U17	1	(0)
2007–2008	Ukraine U19	7	(0)
- * Club domestic league appearances and goals as of 18 June 2017 ‡ National team caps and goals as of 3 August 2016

Oleksandr Hennadiiovych Kablash (Ukrainian: Олександр Геннадійович Каблаш; born 5 September 1989) is a Ukrainian footballer.

== Career ==
=== Club ===
Kablash began his career in the youth team of Chornomorets Odesa, joining Illichivets Mariupol on loan in 2007. In November 2008, Kablash signed for Dnister Ovidiopol.

In January 2015, Kablash moved to the Uzbek League, signing for Nasaf. After parting ways with FC Istiklol in June 2016, Kablash was linked with a move to Vorskla Poltava, before eventually signing for Dacia Chișinău.

== Career statistics ==
=== Club ===
As of match played 30 May 2017

Club	Season	League			National Cup		Continental		Other		Total	
Club	Season	Division	Apps	Goals	Apps	Goals	Apps	Goals	Apps	Goals	Apps	Goals
Dnister Ovidiopol	2009–10	Persha Liha	29	7	1	0	-		-		30	7
Ekranas	2010	A Lyga	9	0			-		-		9	0
Tavriya Simferopol	2010–11	Ukrainian Premier League	5	1	0	0	-		-		5	1
Tavriya Simferopol	2011–12	Ukrainian Premier League	0	0	0	0	-		-		0	0
Tavriya Simferopol	Total		5	1	0	0	-	-	-	-	5	1
Bukovyna Chernivtsi (loan)	2011–12	Persha Liha	3	0	0	0	-		-		3	0
Odesa	2012–13	Persha Liha	5	1	0	0	-		-		5	1
Mykolaiv	2012–13	Persha Liha	12	4	0	0	-		-		12	4
Mykolaiv	2013–14	Persha Liha	16	3	2	0	-		-		18	3
Mykolaiv	Total		28	7	2	0	-	-	-	-	30	7
Helios Kharkiv	2013–14	Persha Liha	4	0	0	0	-		-		4	0
Sogdiana Jizzakh	2014	Uzbek League	12	4			-		-		12	4
Nasaf	2015	Uzbek League	3	2	0	0	4	0	-		7	2
Istiklol	2016	Tajik League	3	0	0	0	5	2	1	2	9	4
Dacia Chișinău	2016	Divizia Națională	26	5	1	0	-		1	0	28	5
Career total			127	27	4	0	9	2	2	2	142	31

== Honours ==
Ekranas

- A Lyga (1): 2010

Istiklol

- Tajik Supercup (1): 2016
