= Ghafurov =

Ghafurov Russian: Гафуров Tajik: Ғафуров
- Location in Tajikistan
- Coordinates: 40°13′12″N 69°43′48″E
- Country: Tajikistan
- Region: Sughd Region
- District: Ghafurov District

Area
  - Total: 13.6 km^{2} (5.3 sq mi)

Population (2020)
  - Total: 20,600

Ghafurov (also Gafurov, Tajik: Ғафуров, romanized: Ğafurov/Ƣafurov; Russian: Гафуров, romanized: Gafurov) is a town in Ghafurov district, Sughd Region, Tajikistan. It has a population of 20,600 (2020 estimate), up from 18,900 in the 1989 census. The town was created in 1965, and until 1978 had the name Sovietabad (Russian: Советабад). In that year it was renamed in honor of Bobojon Ghafurovich Ghafurov, commemorating his term of office as the First Secretary of the Central Committee of the Communist Party of Tajikistan from 1946 to 1956.

Ghafurov is the administrative center of Ghafurov district. The city lies a few kilometers southeast of the regional capital of Khujand near the border with Kyrgyzstan. A chief product of the city is vegetable and fruit preserves. There is also a cotton industry. The nearest train station is Khujand (formerly Leninabad).
