= Zarzamin =

- Town and Jamoat
- Location in Tajikistan
- Coordinates: 40°14′N 69°48′E
- Country: Tajikistan
- Region: Sughd Region
- District: Ghafurov District

Population (2015)
  - Total: 12,744
- Time zone: UTC+5 (TJT)
- Official languages: Russian (Interethnic); Tajik (State)

Zarzamin (Russian and Tajik: Зарзамин, formerly: Katagan) is a village and jamoat in north-west Tajikistan. It is located in Ghafurov District in Sughd Region. The jamoat has a total population of 12,744 (2015).
