= Petro Kovalchuk =

Ukrainian footballer (born 1984)

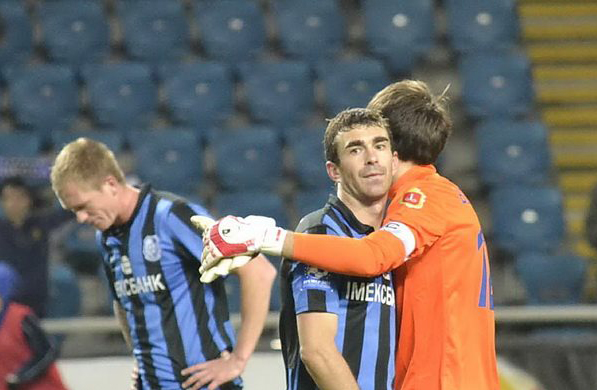
- Kovalchuk with Chornomorets Odesa in 2014

Personal information
- Full name: Petro Yaroslavovych Kovalchuk
- Date of birth: 28 May 1984 (age 42)
- Place of birth: Seredniy Maydan, Ukrainian SSR, Soviet Union
- Height: 1.83 m (6 ft 0 in)
- Position: Defender

Senior career*
| Years | Team | Apps | (Gls) |
| 2001 | Prykarpattya Ivano-Frankivsk | 1 | (0) |
| 2001–2005 | Chornohora Ivano-Frankivsk | 64 | (0) |
| 2005–2007 | Spartak Ivano-Frankivsk | 52 | (0) |
| 2007–2009 | Kryvbas Kryvyi Rih | 45 | (1) |
| 2009 | Dniester Ovidiopol | 7 | (1) |
| 2010 | Lviv | 31 | (0) |
| 2011–2014 | Chornomorets Odesa | 45 | (0) |
| 2014 | Slutsk | 9 | (0) |
| 2015–2016 | Istiklol | 32 | (1) |
| 2017 | Club Green Streets | | |
| 2018–2019 | Prykarpattia Ivano-Frankivsk | 38 | (3) |
| 2020 | Pokuttia Kolomyia | | |
| 2021 | Vilhivtsi | | |
- * Club domestic league appearances and goals as of 17 December 2019

Petro Kovalchuk (Ukrainian: Петро Ярославович Ковальчук; born 28 May 1984) is a Ukrainian former professional footballer who played as a defender.

== Career ==
In July 2007, Kovalchuk joined Kryvbas from Spartak Ivano-Frankivsk. Kovalchuk also played then for Dniester Ovidiopol and FC Lviv.

On 1 February 2011, Kovalchuk signed a 1.5-year deal with Chornomorets.

In March 2015, Kovalchuk moved to Tajikistan, signing for Tajikistan Higher League Champions FC Istiklol, leaving the club after his contract expired in January 2017.

In January 2017 he signed a contract with Maldivian football Club Green Streets, along with another two Ukrainian footballers. He made his debut for CGS in a match against Victory Sports Club on 25 February 2017.

== Career statistics ==
As of match played 5 November 2016

| Club | Season | League | | | National Cup | | Continental | | Other | | Total | |
| Club | Season | Division | Apps | Goals | Apps | Goals | Apps | Goals | Apps | Goals | Apps | Goals |
|---|---|---|---|---|---|---|---|---|---|---|---|---|
| Chornomorets Odesa | 2010–11 | Ukrainian Premier League | 13 | 0 | | | - | | - | | 13 | 0 |
| Chornomorets Odesa | 2011–12 | Ukrainian Premier League | 19 | 0 | 2 | 0 | - | | - | | 21 | 0 |
| Chornomorets Odesa | 2012–13 | Ukrainian Premier League | 6 | 0 | 1 | 0 | - | | - | | 7 | 0 |
| Chornomorets Odesa | 2013–14 | Ukrainian Premier League | 7 | 0 | 2 | 0 | 1 | 0 | - | | 10 | 0 |
| Chornomorets Odesa | Total | | 45 | 0 | 5 | 0 | 1 | 0 | 0 | 0 | 51 | 0 |
| Slutsk | 2014 | Vysheyshaya Liga | 9 | 0 | 0 | 0 | - | | - | | 9 | 0 |
| Istiklol | 2015 | Tajikistan Higher League | 16 | 0 | 7 | 0 | 11 | 0 | 1 | 0 | 35 | 0 |
| Istiklol | 2016 | Tajikistan Higher League | 16 | 1 | 6 | 0 | 6 | 0 | 1 | 0 | 29 | 1 |
| Istiklol | Total | | 32 | 1 | 13 | 0 | 17 | 0 | 2 | 0 | 64 | 1 |
| Career total | | | 86 | 1 | 18 | 0 | 18 | 0 | 2 | 0 | 124 | 1 |

== Honours ==
Istiklol

- Tajikistan Higher League (2): 2015, 2016
- Tajikistan Cup (2): 2015, 2016
- Tajik Supercup (2): 2015, 2016
