= Undzhi =

Unji Russian: Унджи Tajik: Унҷӣ
- Village and Jamoat
- Location in Tajikistan
- Coordinates: 40°18′N 69°42′E
- Country: Tajikistan
- Region: Sughd Region
- District: Ghafurov District

Population (2015)
  - Total: 45,760
- Time zone: UTC+5 (TJT)
- Official languages: Russian (Interethnic); Tajik (State)

Undzhi or Unji (Russian: Унджи; Tajik: Унҷӣ Unjí) is a village and jamoat in north-west Tajikistan. It is located in Ghafurov District in Sughd Region. The jamoat has a total population of 45,230 (2015).

It is a suburb of Khujand and is known for its fruit and vegetable market, thanks to the abundance of agriculture in the area. Notable streets in the town include Oktyabr Street.
