= Nuriddin Davronov =

Tajik footballer (born 1991)

Personal information
- Full name: Nuriddin Amadbekovich Davronov
- Date of birth: 16 January 1991 (age 35)
- Place of birth: Dushanbe, Tajikistan
- Height: 1.80 m (5 ft 11 in)
- Position: Midfielder

Youth career
- Lokomotiv Moscow
- Minsk
- Amkar Perm

Senior career*
Years	Team	Apps	(Gls)
2008	Energetik Dushanbe		
2009–2012	Istiklol		
2013	Sloboda Užice	8	(0)
2013–2016	Istiklol	39	(3)
2016–2017	Dunav Ruse	8	(0)
2017	→ Istiklol (loan)	9	(1)
2017–2018	Istiklol	1	(1)
2018–2019	Madura United	15	(1)
2019	Istiklol	2	(0)
2019–2020	Oman Club		
2020–2021	Borneo	15	(0)
2021	→ Istiklol (loan)	0	(0)
2021–2022	Persita Tangerang	3	(0)
2022	Istiklol	5	(1)
2022	Mohammedan	9	(0)
2023	Real Kashmir	10	(0)
2023	Kuching City	5	(0)

International career
2006–2007	Tajikistan U17		
2014	Tajikistan U23	4	(0)
2008–2021	Tajikistan	50	(8)
- * Club domestic league appearances and goals

Nuriddin Amadbekovich Davronov (Tajik: Нуриддин Давронов; born on 16 January 1991) is a Tajik former professional footballer who played as a midfielder.

== Early life ==
Davronov was born in Dushanbe to artists Ahmadbek Davronov and his mother Shirinmoh Niholova.

== Club career ==
=== Earlier career ===
Davronov played for the B team of Lokomotiv Moscow in 2008. After playing one season with Energetik Dushanbe in 2008, he joined Istiklol where he played the following four seasons having won a number of domestic titles.

=== Sloboda ===
During the winter break of the 2012–13 season Davronov joined Serbian club Sloboda Užice. He made his debut for the Sloboda on March 2, 2013, in a 1–0 win against BSK Borča.

=== Dunav Ruse ===
In August 2016, Davronov went on trial with Bulgarian side Dunav Ruse, going on to sign a one-year contract with the club on 16 August 2016.

=== Istiklol loan ===
On 7 February 2017, Davronov returned to Istiklol on loan, until 31 July 2017.

=== Madura United ===
In December 2017, Davronov signed for Indonesian Liga 1 side Madura United on a one-year contract. After suffering a season-ending knee injury, Davronov's contract with Madura United was terminated by mutual consent in August 2018.

=== Oman Club ===
On 22 August 2019, Davronov was announced as a new signing for Oman Club.

=== Second Istiklol loan ===
On 11 February 2021, Istiklol announced the return of Davronov on loan from Borneo until after the AFC Champions League group stages in the summer of 2021. Davronov returned to Borneo when his loan expired on 15 May 2021.

=== Istiklol return ===
On 31 March 2022, Istiklol announced the return of Davronov.

=== Mohammedan ===
In June 2022, Davronov moved to India and signed with I-League club Mohammedan. On 16 August, he made his debut for the club against Goa in the Durand Cup, which ended in a 3–1 comeback win. He made his I-League debut on 12 November in their 1–0 defeat to Gokulam Kerala. On 26 December 2022, Davronov's contract was terminated by mutual agreement with immediate effect.

=== Real Kashmir ===
On 5 January 2023, it was officially announced that I-League side Real Kashmir has roped in Davronov till the end of the season.

== International career ==
Davronov appeared at the 2007 FIFA U-17 World Cup held in South Korea. He has been playing for the senior side since 2008. He played with Tajikistan in the 2008 AFC Challenge Cup where they finished as runners-up by losing to India in final.

== Post-playing career ==
On 16 February 2024, Istiklol announced the appointment of Davronov as their new Sporting Director.

== Career statistics ==
=== Club ===
Appearances and goals by club, season and competition
Club	Season	League			National cup		Continental		Other		Total	
Club	Season	Division	Apps	Goals	Apps	Goals	Apps	Goals	Apps	Goals	Apps	Goals
Istiklol	2009	Tajik League					–		–			
Istiklol	2010	Tajik League					–		1 (Note: Appearance(s) in Tajik Supercup)	0	1	0
Istiklol	2011	Tajik League					5 (Note: Appearance(s) in AFC President's Cup)	1	1	0	6	1
Istiklol	2012	Tajik League					5	0	1	0	6	0
Istiklol	Total						10	1	3	0	13	1
Sloboda Užice	2012–13	Serbian SuperLiga	8	0			–		–		8	0
Istiklol	2013	Tajik League	6	1			–		–		6	1
Istiklol	2014	Tajik League	14	1	4 (Note: Appearance(s) in Tajikistan Cup)	0	–		1	0	19	1
Istiklol	2015	Tajik League	12	1	4	1	11 (Note: Appearance(s) in AFC Cup)	1	1	0	28	3
Istiklol	2016	Tajik League	7	0	2	0	5	0	1	0	15	0
Istiklol	Total		39	3	10	1	16	1	3	0	67	5
Dunav Ruse	2016–17	Bulgarian First League	8	0	2 (Note: Appearance(s) in Bulgarian Cup)	0	–		–		10	0
Istiklol (loan)	2017	Tajik League	9	1	0	0	5	1	1	0	15	2
Istiklol	2017	Tajik League	1	1	1	0	3	1	0	0	5	2
Madura United	2018	Liga 1	15	1	0	0	–		–		15	1
Istiklol	2019	Tajik League	2	0	0	0	2	0	0	0	4	0
Oman Club	2019–20	Oman Professional League					–		–			
Borneo	2020	Liga 1	3	0	0	0	–		–		3	0
Borneo	2021–22	Liga 1	12	0	0	0	–		–		12	0
Borneo	Total		15	0	0	0	0	0	0	0	15	0
Istiklol (loan)	2021	Tajik League	0	0	0	0	5 (Note: Appearance(s) in AFC Champions League)	0	1	0	6	0
Persita Tangerang (loan)	2021–22	Liga 1	3	0	0	0	–		–		3	0
Istiklol	2022	Tajik League	5	1	0	0	5	0	1	0	11	1
Mohammedan	2022–23	I-League	9	0	5 (Note: Appearance(s) in Durand Cup)	0	–		–		14	0
Real Kashmir	2022–23	I-League	10	0	0	0	–		–		10	0
Career total			124	7	18	0	46	4	9	0	197	11

=== International ===
Appearances and goals by national team and year
National team	Year	Apps	Goals
Tajikistan	2008	2	0
Tajikistan	2009	0	0
Tajikistan	2010	1	0
Tajikistan	2011	11	1
Tajikistan	2012	6	1
Tajikistan	2013	4	1
Tajikistan	2014	5	2
Tajikistan	2015	7	1
Tajikistan	2016	8	1
Tajikistan	2017	3	1
Tajikistan	2018	1	0
Tajikistan	2019	1	0
Tajikistan	2020	0	0
Tajikistan	2021	1	0
Total		50	8

Scores and results list Tajikistan's goal tally first, score column indicates score after each Davronov goal.

List of international goals scored by Nuriddin Davronov
No.	Date	Venue	Opponent	Score	Result	Competition
1	23 March 2011	National Stadium, Malé, Maldives	Cambodia	1–0	3–0	2012 AFC Challenge Cup qualification
2	9 March 2012	Dasarath Rangasala Stadium, Kathmandu, Nepal	India	2–0	2–0	2012 AFC Challenge Cup
3	14 August 2013	20 Years of Independence Stadium, Khujand, Tajikistan	India	1–0	3–0	Friendly
4	4 May 2014	Pamir Stadium, Dushanbe, Tajikistan	Afghanistan	1–0	1–0	Friendly
5	8 August 2014	Pamir Stadium, Dushanbe, Tajikistan	Malaysia	4–1	4–1	Friendly
6	31 March 2015	Pamir Stadium, Dushanbe, Tajikistan	Syria	1–2	2–3	Friendly
7	5 October 2016	Pamir Stadium, Dushanbe, Tajikistan	Palestine	1–0	3–3	Friendly
8	10 October 2017	Central Stadium, Hisor, Tajikistan	Nepal	1–0	3–0	2019 AFC Asian Cup qualification

== Honours ==
Istiqlol

- Tajik League: 2010, 2011, 2014, 2015, 2017
- Tajik Cup: 2009, 2010, 2011, 2014
- Tajik Super Cup: 2010, 2011, 2012, 2014, 2015, 2016, 2021, 2022
- AFC President's Cup: 2012

Mohammedan Sporting

- CFL Premier Division A: 2022

Tajikistan

- AFC Challenge Cup runner-up: 2008
