= Dadoboy Kholmatov =

- Jamoat
- Location in Tajikistan
- Coordinates: 40°19′N 69°41′E
- Country: Tajikistan
- Region: Sughd Region
- District: Ghafurov District

Population (2015)
  - Total: 12,966
- Time zone: UTC+5 (TJT)

Ghafurov District within Tajikistan

Dadoboy Kholmatov (Tajik: Дадобой Холматов, formerly: Pakhtakor) is a jamoat in north-west Tajikistan. It is located in Ghafurov District in Sughd Region. The jamoat has a total population of 12,966 (2015).
