= Ghafurov District =

Ghafurov District Russian: Гафуровский район Tajik: Ноҳияи Ғафуров
- District
- Location of Ghafurov District in Tajikistan
- Coordinates: 40°22′N 69°48′E
- Country: Tajikistan
- Region: Sughd Region
- Capital: Ghafurov

Area
  - Total: 2,700 km^{2} (1,000 sq mi)

Population (2020)
  - Total: 380,500
  - Density: 140/km^{2} (360/sq mi)
- Time zone: UTC+5 (TJT)

Ghafurov District (Russian: Гафуровский район; Tajik: Ноҳияи Ғафуров, romanized: Nohiyayi Ghafurov) is a district in the northern part of Sughd Region, Tajikistan. Its capital is Ghafurov, a town in the south of the district. The district surrounds, but does not include the cities Khujand (the regional capital), Istiqlol (in the north), Buston (formerly Chkalovsk, in the south), and Guliston (formerly Kayrakkum), also in the south, which gave its name to the adjacent Kayrakkum Reservoir.

The district has a population of 380,500 (as of 2020), with 95% classified as rural. It produced 19,500 tons of raw cotton in 2007, accounting for 16% of total cotton production in Sughd province and nearly 5% of Tajikistan's cotton production.

== Administrative divisions ==
The district has an area of about 2,700 km^{2} (1,000 sq mi) and is divided administratively into one town and eleven jamoats. They are as follows:

Jamoat	Population (Jan. 2015)
Ghafurov (town)	18,400
Chashmasor	10,275
Dadoboy Kholmatov	12,966
Goziyon	18,760
Haidar Usmonov	37,017
Isfisor	39,590
Ismoil	19,844
Khistevarz	52,758
Ovchi Kalacha	21,585
Unji	45,760
Yova	40,297
Zarzamin	12,744
