= 2014 FC Istiklol season =

FC Istiklol
2014 season
- President: Shohruh Saidov
- Manager: Mubin Ergashev
- Stadium: Republican Stadium
- Tajik League: Champions
- Tajik Cup: Champions
- Tajik Supercup: Champions
- Top goalscorer: League: Dilshod Vasiev (15); All: Dilshod Vasiev (27)

The FC Istiklol 2014 season was Istiklol's sixth Tajik League season. They won the League for the third time, whilst also winning the Supercup and defending their Tajik Cup title. Mubin Ergashev was appointed the club's new manager 13 January 2014, guiding the team to an undefeated season.

== Squad ==
As of match played 22 November 2014

No.	Name	Nationality	Position	Date of birth (age)	Signed from	Signed in	Contract ends	Apps.	Goals
Goalkeepers
1	Nikola Stošić	(Serbia)	GK	15 March 1994 (aged 20)	Železničar Beograd	2013		13	0
16	Alisher Tuychiev	(Tajikistan)	GK	8 March 1976 (aged 38)	Vakhsh Qurghonteppa	2011			
30	Emomali Soniev	(Tajikistan)	GK	7 November 1996 (aged 18)	Youth Team	2013		1	0
Defenders
2	Siyovush Asrorov	(Tajikistan)	DF	21 July 1992 (aged 22)	Khujand	2013		23	3
3	Glaúber da Silva	(Brazil)	DF	1 October 1981 (aged 33)	Halcones	2013		27	1
4	Eraj Rajabov	(Tajikistan)	DF	9 November 1990 (aged 24)	Dynamo Dushanbe	2009			
6	Naim Ulmasov	(Tajikistan)	DF	26 April 1992 (aged 22)	Vakhsh Qurghonteppa	2013		23	1
19	Akhtam Nazarov	(Tajikistan)	DF	29 September 1992 (aged 22)	Energetik Dushanbe	2013		32	1
Midfielders
7	Umedzhon Sharipov	(Tajikistan)	MF	4 October 1992 (aged 22)	Vakhsh Qurghonteppa	2012			
8	Nuriddin Davronov	(Tajikistan)	MF	16 January 1991 (aged 23)	Sloboda Užice	2013			
11	Jakhongir Jalilov	(Tajikistan)	MF	28 September 1989 (aged 25)	Youth Team	2009			
14	David Mawutor	(Ghana)	MF	12 April 1992 (aged 22)	Ravshan Kulob	2014		22	2
18	Fatkhullo Fatkhuloev	(Tajikistan)	MF	24 March 1990 (aged 24)	Dynamo Dushanbe	2008			
20	Khurshed Makhmudov	(Tajikistan)	MF	8 August 1982 (aged 32)	Regar-TadAZ	2014		22	8
21	Romish Jalilov	(Tajikistan)	MF	21 November 1995 (aged 19)	Youth Team	2012			
25	Mehrodzhiddin Muzaffarov	(Tajikistan)	MF			2014		4	2
	Nowruz Abdul	(Tajikistan)	MF			2014		1	0
Forwards
9	Davron Mirzaev	(Uzbekistan)	FW	8 February 1989 (aged 25)	Neftekhimik Nizhnekamsk	2014		5	1
10	Manolo Bleda	(Spain)	FW	31 July 1990 (aged 24)	Belshina Bobruisk	2014		9	7
12	Jahongir Ergashev	(Tajikistan)	FW	6 March 1994 (aged 20)	CSKA Pamir Dushanbe	2013		36	17
17	Dilshod Vasiev	(Tajikistan)	FW	12 February 1988 (aged 26)	Energetik Dushanbe	2009			
22	Kamil Saidov	(Tajikistan)	FW	25 January 1989 (aged 25)	Regar-TadAZ	2014		20	10
Out on loan
3	Sokhib Suvonkulov	(Tajikistan)	DF	15 September 1988 (aged 26)	Vakhsh Qurghonteppa	2009			
27	Alisher Safarov	(Tajikistan)	DF	24 June 1998 (aged 16)	Youth Team	2014		2	0
Left during the season
	Silvanus Evans	(Ghana)	GK	18 October 1993 (aged 21)	Vakhsh Qurghonteppa	2014		0	0
10	Willer	(Brazil)	FW	18 November 1979 (aged 35)	Halcones	2013		20	4
	Jocimar	(Brazil)	FW	18 January 1979 (aged 35)	Motagua	2014		0	0

=== Out on loan ===
Note: Flags indicate national team as defined under FIFA eligibility rules; some limited exceptions apply. Players may hold more than one non-FIFA nationality.

No. / Pos. / Nation / Player; 24 / MF / TJK / Alisher Safarov (at Vakhsh Qurghonteppa)	No. / Pos. / Nation / Player; — / DF / TJK / Sokhib Suvonkulov (at Vakhsh Qurghonteppa)

== Transfers ==
=== Winter ===
In: Note: Flags indicate national team as defined under FIFA eligibility rules; some limited exceptions apply. Players may hold more than one non-FIFA nationality.

No.	Pos.	Nation	Player
9	FW	UZB	Davron Mirzaev (from (Russia) Neftekhimik Nizhnekamsk)
14	MF	GHA	David Mawutor (from (Tajikistan) Ravshan Kulob)
20	MF	TJK	Khurshed Makhmudov (from (Tajikistan) Regar-TadAZ)
22	FW	TJK	Kamil Saidov (from (Tajikistan) Regar-TadAZ)
—	GK	GHA	Silvanus Evans (from (Tajikistan) Vakhsh Qurghonteppa)
—	FW	BRA	Jocimar (from (Guatemala) Motagua)

Out: Note: Flags indicate national team as defined under FIFA eligibility rules; some limited exceptions apply. Players may hold more than one non-FIFA nationality.

No.	Pos.	Nation	Player
7	MF	TJK	Ibrahim Rabimov (to (Tajikistan) Energetik Dushanbe)
8	FW	UGA	Eugene Sseppuya
20	FW	IRI	Hossein Sohrabi (tp (Tajikistan) Khayr Vahdat)
22	DF	GHA	Benjamin Awuku (to (Tajikistan) Khujand)
23	MF	RUS	Aleksandr Kudryashov
29	DF	TJK	Iskandar Dzhalilov (loan return to (Russia) Rubin Kazan)
31	MF	TJK	Orzu Dodkhudoev
33	MF	RUS	Artyom Petrenko
—	GK	GHA	Silvanus Evans (to (Tajikistan) Khujand)

=== Summer ===
In: Note: Flags indicate national team as defined under FIFA eligibility rules; some limited exceptions apply. Players may hold more than one non-FIFA nationality.

No.	Pos.	Nation	Player
10	FW	ESP	Manolo Bleda (from (Belarus) Belshina Bobruisk)
—	DF	TJK	Sokhib Suvonkulov

Out: Note: Flags indicate national team as defined under FIFA eligibility rules; some limited exceptions apply. Players may hold more than one non-FIFA nationality.

No.	Pos.	Nation	Player
10	FW	BRA	Willer (to (Guatemala) Halcones)
24	MF	TJK	Alisher Safarov (loan to (Tajikistan) Vakhsh)
—	DF	TJK	Sokhib Suvonkulov (loan to (Tajikistan) Vakhsh)
—	FW	BRA	Jocimar (to (Brazil) Tupy)

== Friendlies ==
18 September 2014	Istiklol	5–4	Regar-TadAZ	Dushanbe
16:00 (UTC+5)	Muzaffarov 9' (yellow card); Bleda 41', 70', 86'; Saidov 52' (yellow card)	Report	Karaev 26'; Rakhmonov 57'; Choriev 65'; Khamrakulov 90' (pen.); Ergashev (yellow card)	Stadium: Republican Stadium; Referee: Parviz Murtazoev

25 September 2014	Istiklol	4–2	CSKA Dushanbe	Dushanbe
16:00 (UTC+5)	Bleda 9' (pen.), 26' (yellow card) da Silva 55'; Makhsum 74'; Mawutor (yellow card); Saidov (yellow card)	Report	Hodzhamov 12'; Force 40' (pen.) (yellow card); Rahmonaliev (yellow card); Sharipov (yellow card)	Stadium: Republican Stadium; Referee: Khusrawi Siddikzod

13 October 2014	Istiklol (Tajikistan)	1–1 (4–5 p)	(Germany) Schalke 04 II	Dushanbe
18:00 (UTC+5)	Vasiev 60'; Davronov (yellow card) 66'	Report	Malsam 9'; Fritz (yellow card) 14'	Stadium: Republican Stadium
	Penalties
	Bleda (penalty scored); Davronov (penalty scored); Nazarov (penalty scored); Fatkhuloev (penalty scored); Ergashev (penalty missed); Vasiev (penalty missed)		Penalty missed Penalty scored

== Competitions ==
=== Tajik Supercup ===
26 March 2014	Ravshan Kulob	0–5	Istiklol	Kulob
17:45 (UTC+5)	Rustamov (yellow card); Rustamov (yellow card); Rasulov (yellow card); Gafforov (yellow card)	Summary	Mawutor 6' (yellow card); R.Jalilov 25'; Vasiev 59'; Ergashev 77'; Shomodurov 85' (o.g.); Fatkhuloev (yellow card)	Stadium: Kulob Central Stadium; Attendance: 18,000; Referee: Hurshed Dadabaev

=== Tajik League ===
==== Results summary ====
Overall								Home						Away					
Pld	W	D	L	GF	GA	GD	Pts	W	D	L	GF	GA	GD	W	D	L	GF	GA	GD
18	16	2	0	65	10	+55	50	7	2	0	39	6	+33	9	0	0	26	4	+22

Last updated: 16 November 2014.
Source: Soccerway

==== Results by round ====
Round	1	2	3	4	5	6	7	8	9	10	11	12	13	14	15	16	17	18
Ground	H	A	H	H	A	H	A	H	A	H	A	H	A	A	H	A	H	A
Result	W	W	D	W	W	W	W	W	W	W	W	W	W	W	W	W	D	W
Position	1	1	1	1	1	1	1	1	1	1	1	1	1	1	1	1	1	1

Source: Soccerway
A = Away; H = Home; W = Win; D = Draw; L = Loss

==== Results ====
12 April 2014 1	Istiklol	1–0	Regar-TadAZ	Dushanbe
18:00 (UTC+5)	Makhmudov 28'; Asrori (yellow card) da Silva (yellow card)	Summary	Rasulov (yellow card) 73' (yellow-red card); Tukhtasunov (yellow card)	Stadium: Republican Stadium; Attendance: 1,000; Referee: Parviz Murtazoev

19 April 2014 2	Istaravshan	0–3	Istiklol	Istaravshan
16:00 (UTC+5)	Leaks (yellow card); Tukhtasunov (yellow card); Musoev (yellow card)	Summary	Makhmudov 26', 61'; Ergashev 77' da Silva (yellow card); Davronov (yellow card)	Stadium: Istaravshan Sports Complex; Attendance: 8,000; Referee: Hurshed Dadoboev

26 April 2014 3	Istiklol	2–2	Energetik Dushanbe	Dushanbe
16:00 (UTC+5)	Saidov 7'; Ulmasov (red card) 38'; Makhmudov 90+5'; Tuychiev (yellow card); Saidov (yellow card); Fatkhuloev (yellow card); Davronov (yellow card); Mawutor (yellow card)	Summary	Choriev 39' (yellow card); Rustamov 52' (pen.); Hodiev (yellow card); Rizoev (yellow card); Muso (yellow card)	Stadium: Republican Stadium; Attendance: 700; Referee: Nasrullo Kabiri

10 May 2014 4	Istiklol	4–0	FK Khujand	Dushanbe
17:00 (UTC+5)	Fatkhuloev 27'; Ergashev 36'; Vasiev 59' (yellow card); Nazarov 90'; Asrori (yellow card); Davronov (yellow card)	Summary	Akuffo (yellow card)	Stadium: Republican Stadium; Attendance: 2,000; Referee: Parviz Murtazoev

17 May 2014 5	CSKA Dushanbe	0–3	Istiklol	Dushanbe
17:00 (UTC+5)	Silla (yellow card)	Summary	Vasiev 55', 71', 78' (yellow card); Mawutor (yellow card); Davronov (yellow card); J.Jalilov (yellow card)	Stadium: CSKA Stadium; Attendance: 1,300; Referee: Sayëdzhon Zayniddinov

25 May 2014 6	Istiklol	9–1	Ravshan Kulob	Dushanbe
17:00 (UTC+5)	Saidov 15', 21', 24', 88'; R.Jalilov 49' (yellow card); Fatkhuloev 64'; Vasiev 67', 76', 84'	Summary	Abdulloev 90+1'; Hassan (yellow card); Bahram (yellow card)	Stadium: Republican Stadium; Attendance: 4,500; Referee: Azam Buriev

29 May 2014 7	Parvoz Bobojon Ghafurov	0–5	Istiklol	Ghafurov
17:00 (UTC+5)	Barotov (yellow card)	Summary	Mawutor 12'; Makhmudov 60'; Fatkhuloev 70'; Ergashev 75'; Sharipov 82'; R.Jalilov (yellow card)	Attendance: 4,500; Referee: Parviz Murtazoev

14 June 2014 8	Istiklol	5–1	Khayr Vahdat	Dushanbe
18:00 (UTC+5)	Vasiev 5', 67'; Makhmudov 33'; Fatkhuloev (red card) 56'; Saidov 64'; Sharipov 89'; Davronov (yellow card); Mawutor (yellow card)	Summary	Sohrabi 85'	Stadium: Republican Stadium; Attendance: 3,000; Referee: Azam Buriev

21 June 2014 9	Vakhsh	0–3	Istiklol	Qurghonteppa
18:00 (UTC+5)	Boron (yellow card); Saydahmad (yellow card)	Summary	Mirzaev 33'; Sharipov 43'; Saidov 71'; Ulmasov (yellow card); Mawutor (yellow card)	Stadium: Tsentralnyi Stadium; Attendance: Sayëdzhon Zayniddinov; Referee: 3,000

17 August 2014 10	Istiklol	8–0	Vakhsh	Dushanbe
17:00 (UTC+5)	Vasiev 27', 43', 45'; R.Jalilov 28'; Asrori 50' (yellow card); Muzaffarov 84', 90+1'; Makhmudov 88'	Summary		Stadium: Republican Stadium; Attendance: 500; Referee: Hurshed Dadaboev

23 August 2014 11	Khayr Vahdat	2–3	Istiklol	Vahdat
17:00 (UTC+5)	Sohrabi 57' (yellow card); Aban 89' (yellow card); Bebey (yellow card)	Summary	R.Jalilov 77', 86'; Vasiev 90'; Mawutor (yellow card)	Attendance: 3,000; Referee: Nasrullo Kabiri

16 October 2014 12	Istiklol	5–1	Parvoz Bobojon Ghafurov	Dushanbe
16:00 (UTC+5)	Ergashev 10', 76'; Bleda 16'; Asrori 34'; Fatkhuloev 86'	Summary	Tokhirov 74'	Stadium: Republican Stadium; Referee: Bahram Sadulloev

19 October 2014 15	Khujand	0–2	Istiklol	Khujand
15:00 (UTC+5)	S.Abramov (yellow card) 90' (yellow-red card) 90'	Summary	R.Jalilov 47'; Mawutor (yellow card) 89'; J.Jalilov (yellow card) 90'; Fatkhuloev 90+3'	Stadium: 20 Years of Independence Stadium

22 October 2014 13	Ravshan Kulob	1–2	Istiklol	Kulob
15:00 (UTC+5)	Komron 84'	Summary	Sharipov 38'; Vasiev 82'	Stadium: Kulob Central Stadium

29 October 2014 14	Istiklol	4–0	CSKA Dushanbe	Dushanbe
16:00 (UTC+5)	Bleda 7'; Fatkhuloev 43'; Davronov 53' (yellow card); Vasiev 60'; Mawutor (yellow card)	Summary	A.Silla (yellow card)	Stadium: Republican Stadium; Attendance: 500; Referee: Hurshed Dadoboev

1 November 2014 16	Energetik Dushanbe	0 – 3 Awarded	Istiklol	Dushanbe
15:00 (UTC+5)		Summary

12 November 2014 17	Istiklol	1–1	Istaravshan	Dushanbe
14:00 (UTC+5)	Tukhtasunov 47' (o.g.); J.Jalilov (yellow card); Davronov (yellow card)	Summary	Mawutor 90+3' (o.g.); Hakimov (yellow card); S.Mansurov (yellow card); S.Leaks (yellow card); Negmatov (yellow card); S.Karimov (yellow card)	Stadium: Republican Stadium; Attendance: 2,000; Referee: Sayed Zayniddinov

16 November 2014 18	Regar-TadAZ	1–2	Istiklol	Tursunzoda
14:00 (UTC+5)	B.Qalandarov (yellow card) 31'; Sharipov (yellow card) 42'; F.Karaev (yellow card) 56'; Kholbekov (yellow card) 60'; Khamrakulov 90+3' (pen.)	Summary	Mawutor (yellow card) 19'; R.Jalilov 23'; Asrori (yellow card) 28'; J.Jalilov (yellow card) 31'; Sharipov 51' (pen.) (yellow card) 74' da Silva (yellow card) 89'	Stadium: Stadium Metallurg 1st District; Referee: Bahram Sadulloev

==== League table ====
Pos	Team	Pld	W	D	L	GF	GA	GD	Pts	Qualification or relegation
1	FC Istiklol (C)	18	16	2	0	65	10	+55	50	2015 AFC Cup
2	Khayr Vahdat FK	18	11	2	5	27	17	+10	35	2015 AFC Cup Qualifying play-off
3	FK Daleron-Uroteppa	18	9	6	3	20	11	+9	33	
4	FK Khujand	18	9	5	4	24	17	+7	32	
5	Parvoz	18	8	1	9	28	35	−7	25	
6	Regar-TadAZ	18	5	5	8	25	27	−2	20	
7	Energetik Dushanbe	18	5	4	9	17	30	−13	19	
8	CSKA Pamir Dushanbe	18	3	6	9	14	27	−13	15	
9	Vakhsh	18	4	2	12	12	32	−20	14	
10	Ravshan Kulob	18	2	3	13	18	44	−26	9	

Updated to match(es) played on 25 November 2014. Source: Soccerway
Rules for classification: 1) points; 2) goal difference; 3) number of goals scored.
(C) Champions

=== Tajik Cup ===
27 August 2014 Last 16	Istiklol	6–1	FK Khujand	Dushanbe
18:30 (UTC+5)	Vasiev 11', 32'; Sharipov 15'; Ergashev 45+1'; Fatkhuloev 50'; R.Jalilov 90' (yellow card); Davronov (yellow card)	Summary	Gafforov 69'	Stadium: Republican Stadium; Attendance: 700; Referee: Saydzhon Zayniddinov

4 October 2014 Quarterfinals 1st leg	Istiklol	10–0	Khosilot Farkhor	Dushanbe
(UTC+5)	Bleda 3', 71'; Fatkhuloev 10'; Vasiev 24', 46', 88', 90'; J.Jalilov 35'; Sharipov 45'; Saidov 68'; R.Jalilov (yellow card); Davronov (yellow card)	Summary	Qalandarov (yellow card); Mahmoudov (yellow card); Abdurahmonov (yellow card)	Stadium: Republican Stadium; Attendance: 600; Referee: Hurshed Dadaboev

9 October 2014 Quarterfinals 2nd leg	Khosilot Farkhor	2–5 (2–15 agg.)	Istiklol	Farkhar
(UTC+5)	Naimov (yellow card) 21'; Mahmoudov 26'; Azizov 83'	Summary	Ergashev 11', 21', 78'; Saidov 60'; Sharipov 66'	Referee: Azam Buriev

26 October 2014 Semifinals 1st leg	Istiklol	5–0	Saroykamar	Dushanbe
15:00 (UTC+5)	Bleda 9', 53' (pen.), 80' (yellow card); Vasiev 30', 71'; Davronov (yellow card)	Summary	I.Muhtochzoda (yellow card); H.Yakubov (yellow card)	Stadium: Republican Stadium; Attendance: 1,500; Referee: Khusrawi Siddikzod

6 November 2014 Semifinals 2nd leg	Saroykamar	1–1 (1–6 agg.)	Istiklol	Panj
(UTC+5)	I.Muhtodzhzoda 44' (pen.); H.Yamaki (yellow card); H.Yakubov (yellow card)	Summary	Saidov 25'; J.Jalilov (yellow card); Sharipov (yellow card)	Stadium: Central Stadium; Attendance: 7,000; Referee: Sayëdzhon Zayniddinov

22 November 2014 Final	Istiklol	5–2	Regar-TadAZ	Dushanbe
(UTC+5)	Makhmudov 12'; Vasiev 22', 81', 90+3'; R.Jalilov 43'; Davronov (yellow card)	Summary	Khamrakulov 31', 48'	Stadium: Republican Stadium; Attendance: 7,000; Referee: Hurshed Dadaboev

== Squad statistics ==
As of Match played 22 November 2014

=== Appearances and goals ===
No.	Pos	Nat	Player	Total		Tajik League		Tajik Cup		Tajik Supercup	
No.	Pos	Nat	Player	Apps	Goals	Apps	Goals	Apps	Goals	Apps	Goals
1	GK	(Serbia) SRB	Nikola Stošić	9	0	6+1	0	2	0	0	0
2	DF	(Tajikistan) TJK	Siyovush Asrorov	16	2	9+1	2	5	0	1	0
3	DF	(Brazil) BRA	Glaúber da Silva	15	0	12	0	1+1	0	1	0
4	DF	(Tajikistan) TJK	Eraj Rajabov	19	0	12	0	5+1	0	1	0
6	DF	(Tajikistan) TJK	Naim Ulmasov	10	0	4+3	0	2+1	0	0	0
7	MF	(Tajikistan) TJK	Umedzhon Sharipov	18	8	5+7	5	6	3	0	0
8	MF	(Tajikistan) TJK	Nuriddin Davronov	19	1	14	1	3+1	0	1	0
9	FW	(Uzbekistan) UZB	Davron Mirzaev	5	1	2+3	1	0	0	0	0
10	FW	(Spain) ESP	Manolo Bleda	9	7	5+1	2	2+1	5	0	0
11	MF	(Tajikistan) TJK	Jakhongir Jalilov	19	2	13+1	0	5	2	0	0
12	FW	(Tajikistan) TJK	Jahongir Ergashev	19	10	5+9	5	3+1	4	0+1	1
14	MF	(Ghana) GHA	David Mawutor	22	2	16	1	5	0	1	1
16	GK	(Tajikistan) TJK	Alisher Tuychiev	16	0	11	0	3+1	0	1	0
17	FW	(Tajikistan) TJK	Dilshod Vasiev	24	27	13+4	15	5+1	11	1	1
18	MF	(Tajikistan) TJK	Fatkhullo Fatkhuloev	19	8	10+3	6	4+1	2	1	0
19	DF	(Tajikistan) TJK	Akhtam Nazarov	14	1	8+2	1	1+2	0	1	0
20	MF	(Tajikistan) TJK	Khurshed Makhmudov	22	8	15+1	7	4+1	1	1	0
21	MF	(Tajikistan) TJK	Romish Jalilov	24	8	16+1	6	6	1	1	1
22	FW	(Tajikistan) TJK	Kamil Saidov	20	10	10+6	7	2+2	3	0	0
25	MF	(Tajikistan) TJK	Mehrodzhiddin Muzaffarov	4	2	0+1	2	1+2	0	0	0
30	GK	(Tajikistan) TJK	Emomali Soniev	1	0	0	0	1	0	0	0
	MF	(Tajikistan) TJK	Nowruz Abdul	1	0	0	0	0+1	0	0	0
Players away from Istiklol on loan during the season:
24	MF	(Tajikistan) TJK	Alisher Safarov	2	0	1	0	0	0	0+1	0
Players who appeared for Istiklol no longer at the club:
10	FW	(Brazil) BRA	Willer	3	0	0+2	0	0	0	0+1	0

=== Goal scorers ===
Place	Position	Nation	Number	Name	Tajik League	Tajik Cup	Tajik Supercup	Total
1	FW	(Tajikistan)	17	Dilshod Vasiev	15	11	1	27
2	FW	(Tajikistan)	22	Kamil Saidov	7	3	0	10
2	FW	(Tajikistan)	12	Jahongir Ergashev	5	4	1	10
4	FW	(Tajikistan)	20	Khurshed Makhmudov	7	1	0	8
4	MF	(Tajikistan)	18	Fatkhullo Fatkhuloev	6	2	0	8
4	MF	(Tajikistan)	21	Romish Jalilov	6	1	1	8
4	MF	(Tajikistan)	7	Umedzhon Sharipov	5	3	0	8
8	FW	(Spain)	10	Manolo Bleda	2	5	0	7
9	MF	(Tajikistan)	25	Mehrodzhiddin Muzaffarov	2	0	0	2
9	DF	(Tajikistan)	2	Siyovush Asrorov	2	0	0	2
9	MF	(Ghana)	14	David Mawutor	1	0	1	2
9	MF	(Tajikistan)	11	Jakhongir Jalilov	0	2	0	2
9				Own goal	1	0	1	2
14	DF	(Tajikistan)	19	Akhtam Nazarov	1	0	0	1
14	FW	(Uzbekistan)	9	Davron Mirzaev	1	0	0	1
14	MF	(Tajikistan)	8	Nuriddin Davronov	1	0	0	1
				Awarded Goal	3	0	0	3
				TOTALS	65	32	5	102

=== Disciplinary record ===
Number	Nation	Position	Name	Tajik League		Tajik Cup		Tajik Supercup		Total	
Number	Nation	Position	Name	Yellow card	Red card	Yellow card	Red card	Yellow card	Red card	Yellow card	Red card
2	(Tajikistan)	DF	Siyovush Asrorov	4	0	0	0	0	0	4	0
3	(Brazil)	DF	Glaúber da Silva	3	0	0	0	0	0	3	0
6	(Tajikistan)	DF	Naim Ulmasov	1	1	0	0	0	0	1	1
7	(Tajikistan)	MF	Umedzhon Sharipov	2	0	1	0	0	0	3	0
8	(Tajikistan)	MF	Nuriddin Davronov	6	0	4	0	0	0	10	0
10	(Spain)	FW	Manolo Bleda	0	0	1	0	0	0	1	0
11	(Tajikistan)	MF	Jakhongir Jalilov	4	0	1	0	0	0	5	0
14	(Ghana)	MF	David Mawutor	8	0	0	0	1	0	9	0
16	(Tajikistan)	GK	Alisher Tuychiev	1	0	0	0	0	0	1	0
17	(Tajikistan)	FW	Dilshod Vasiev	2	0	0	0	0	0	2	0
18	(Tajikistan)	MF	Fatkhullo Fatkhuloev	1	1	0	0	1	0	2	1
21	(Tajikistan)	MF	Romish Jalilov	2	0	2	0	0	0	4	0
22	(Tajikistan)	FW	Kamil Saidov	1	0	0	0	0	0	1	0
			TOTALS	35	2	9	0	2	0	46	2

== See also ==
- List of unbeaten football club seasons
