= List of football clubs in Tajikistan =

A list of football top division football teams in Tajikistan

- Barkchi Hisor
- CSKA Pamir Dushanbe
- Energetik Dushanbe
- Eskhata Khujand
- FK Khujand
- Gvardia Dushanbe
- Hulbuk
- FC Istiklol
- Panjsher
- Khayr Vahdat FK
- Parvoz Bobojon Ghafurov
- Ravshan Kulob
- Regar-TadAZ Tursunzoda
- Vakhsh Bokhtar
- Hosilot Farkhor
- Zarafshon Pendjikent
- FK Istaravshan
