= Football in Tajikistan =

- Country: Tajikistan
- Governing body: Tajikistan Football Federation
- National team: Men's national team Women's national team

National competitions
- Tajikistan Cup

Club competitions
- Tajikistan Football League

International competitions
- AFC Cup; AFC Champions League; FIFA World Cup; Asian Cup

Football is the most popular sport in Tajikistan, a country that gained independence in 1991.

The national association regularly takes part in competitions organised by FIFA and the Asian Football Confederation at senior and youth level. However, the country has not yet enjoyed any real success. While funds are limited, costs for travel and accommodation for international matches are prohibitively high. It is therefore extremely difficult for the national teams to gain experience, apart from in official competitions.

== History of football in Tajikistan ==
=== Soviet period ===
Football in Tajikistan started to develop in the 1920s and the Tajikistan National Football Federation was established in 1936. In 1937 the first championship of the Tajik SSR (i.e. the Tajik League) was held, which was composed of over 20 teams. Dynamo Stalinabad became the first champion, while Spartak Stalinabad came second and Dinamo Kirovabad came third. In the same year, Dynamo Stalinabad made its debut in the USSR Cup, where it defeated Spartak Tashkent 2–1, however lost to Lokomotiv Baku 5–0.

In 1938 the first Tajik Cup competition was held, in which Dynamo Stalinabad defeated Spartak Leninabad 4–0 in the final. In 1947 Dynamo, for the first time in the history of Tajik football, was represented in the national championship. Dynamo played in the Central Asian zone group three times, along with Spartak Tashkent, ODL Tashkent, Lokomotiv Ashgabat, a team from Frunze and a team from Alma-Ata. As a result, Dynamo gained 25 points and was the winner of the tournament. In September, the winners of the six zonal tournaments left for Moscow to decide the club, that in 1948 would play in the first group of the USSR championship. Unfortunately, players of Tajikistan took only fifth place. Those who played in the first republic to the national championship were B. Boyko, G. Titov, N. Meshcheryakov, A. Sokolov, F. Rukavishnikov, K. Zakharov, M. Meekin, E. Kuzmin, V. Leichenko, K. Pogorelov, AP Babich, B. Fomichev, Yu Piskunyan, N. Emelianov.

The only football club from the Tajik SSR that played in the USSR Top League was SKA-Pamir Dushanbe, where they played three consecutive seasons from 1989 to 1991.

Between 1974 and 1992, several Tajik footballers were members of the USSR national football team and the CIS national football team:

Name	Position	Team	Caps(Goals)	Years
Sergei Nikulin	Defender	USSR	3(0)	1974-1979
Edgar Gess	Midfield	USSR	1(0)	1979
Oleg Shirinbekov	Defender	USSR	3(0)	1988
Oleksiy Cherednyk	Midfield	USSR	2(0)	1989
Sergey Mandreko	Midfield	CIS	4(0)	1992

=== Since independence ===
Following the civil war, Tajik League and Tajik Cup resumed in 1992. In 1994, Tajikistan National Football Federation was reestablished.

Tajikistan national football team success came in 1993, when it came third in ECO Cup, also performed well in the 1998 Asian Games where reached the second round. However, the greatest performance was champions of 2006 AFC Challenge Cup. Performance in subsequent appearances in Challenge Cup were also satisfactory, runner-up of 2008 AFC Challenge Cup and third place 2010 AFC Challenge Cup.

At youth level, Tajikistan national under-17 football team won bronze at AFC U-17 Championship 2006 and the following year reached round-of-16 at 2007 FIFA U-17 World Championship.

Since its foundation in 2005, Tajik football teams have won or at least reached the final in AFC President's Cup apart from 2007.

=== National team ===
Tajikistan national football team qualified for the AFC Asian Cup for the first time in 2023. It was Tajikistan's first major tournament.

== Football stadiums in Tajikistan ==
#	Stadium	City	Capacity	Tenants	Image
1	National Stadium	Dushanbe	30,000	Tajikistan national football team	
2	20 Years of Independence Stadium	Khujand	25,000	FC Khujand	
3	Vose’ District Central Stadium	Hulbuk	21,000	Khatlon Region	
4	Langari Langarieva Stadium	Kulob	20,000	Ravshan Kulob	
5	Pamir Stadium	Dushanbe	20,000	Istiklol; CSKA Pamir Dushanbe	
6	Istaravshan Stadium	Istaravshan	18,000		
7	TALCO Arena	Tursunzoda	13,770		
8	Central Stadium	Bokhtar	10,000	FC Khatlon; Tajik Telecom Qurghonteppa	

== Attendances ==
The average attendance per top-flight football league season and the club with the highest average attendance:

Season	League average	Best club	Best club average
2024	3,024	Ravshan Kulob	11,397

Source: League page on Wikipedia

== See also ==
- List of Tajikistan football transfers 2012
- Lists of stadiums
