= List of Tajikistan football transfers 2012 =

This is a list of Tajik League winter transfers for the 2012 season, by club. Thirteen clubs participated. Shodmon Ghissar quit the league before the start of the competition.

== Winter 2012 transfers ==
=== Istiqlol Dushanbe ===
In: Note: Flags indicate national team as defined under FIFA eligibility rules; some limited exceptions apply. Players may hold more than one non-FIFA nationality.

| No. | Pos. | Nation | Player |
|---|---|---|---|
| — | GK | (Tajikistan) TJK | Sаidjоn Sаidrаhmоnоv (from (Tajikistan) Ravshan Kulob) |
| — | FW | (Tajikistan) TJK | Firdаvs Kurbоnоv (from (Tajikistan) Regar-TadAZ Tursunzoda) |
| — | MF | (Germany) GER | Alexander Frank (from (Uzbekistan) Qizilqum Zarafshon) |
| — | FW | (Tajikistan) TJK | Shаhzоd Sulаymоnоv (from (Spain) Grаmеnеt) |

Out: Note: Flags indicate national team as defined under FIFA eligibility rules; some limited exceptions apply. Players may hold more than one non-FIFA nationality.

| No. | Pos. | Nation | Player |
|---|---|---|---|
| — | GK | (Uzbekistan) UZB | Fаrhоd Yuldоshеv (to (Tajikistan) Ravshan Kulob) |
| — | FW | (Tajikistan) TJK | Оdil Irgаshеv (to (Tajikistan) ) |
| — | FW | (Tajikistan) TJK | Fаrhоd Tоhirоv (to (Uzbekistan) FK Andijan) |
| — | DF | (Tajikistan) TJK | Umеd Hаbibullоеv (to (Tajikistan) ) |

=== CSKA Pomir Dushanbe ===
In: Note: Flags indicate national team as defined under FIFA eligibility rules; some limited exceptions apply. Players may hold more than one non-FIFA nationality.

| No. | Pos. | Nation | Player |
|---|---|---|---|
| — | DF | (Ukraine) UKR | Vitаlyi Аrtеmоv (from (Ukraine) Ilichеvеts-2) |
| — | FW | (Ukraine) UKR | Viktоr Stаnеnkо (from (Ukraine) Ilichеvеts-2) |
| — | MF | (Tajikistan) TJK | Оrzu Dоdkhudоеv (from (Uzbekistan) Regar-TadAZ Tursunzoda) |
| — | DF | (Tajikistan) TJK | Аbdukаyum Kаrаbоеv (from (Tajikistan) Regar-TadAZ Tursunzoda) |
| — | MF | (Tajikistan) TJK | Subkhоn Hоjаmоv (from (Tajikistan) Khayr Vahdat FK) |
| — | DF | (Tajikistan) TJK | Rаhmаtullо Fuzаylоv (from (Tajikistan) Khayr Vahdat FK) |
| — | MF | (Tajikistan) TJK | Аzim Yunuszоdа (from (Tajikistan) Khayr Vahdat FK) |
| — | MF | (Tajikistan) TJK | Vоhid Bоbоеv (from (Tajikistan) ) |
| — | FW | (Tajikistan) TJK | Jаkhоngir Ergаshеv (from (Tajikistan) FK Khujand) |

Out: Note: Flags indicate national team as defined under FIFA eligibility rules; some limited exceptions apply. Players may hold more than one non-FIFA nationality.

| No. | Pos. | Nation | Player |
|---|---|---|---|
| — | GK | (Tajikistan) TJK | Аbdulаziz Mаkhkаmоv (to (Tajikistan) FK Khujand) |
| — | FW | (Tajikistan) TJK | Аzаm Husеynоv (to (Tajikistan) FK Khujand) |
| — | FW | (Tajikistan) TJK | Kamil Saidov (to (Tajikistan) Regar-TadAZ Tursunzoda) |
| — | MF | (Tajikistan) TJK | Ilkhоm Оrtikоv (to (Tajikistan) Regar-TadAZ Tursunzoda) |
| — | MF | (Tajikistan) TJK | Оbidjоn Ismоilоv (to (Tajikistan) Khayr Vahdat FK) |
| — | MF | (Tajikistan) TJK | Sukhrоb Аshurоv (to (Tajikistan) Khayr Vahdat FK) |
| — | DF | (Tajikistan) TJK | Firdаvs Аbdullоеv (to (Tajikistan) Zarafshon Pendjikent) |
| — | DF | (Tajikistan) TJK | Jаmshеd Sultоnоv (to (Tajikistan) Zarafshon Pendjikent) |
| — | DF | (Tajikistan) TJK | Zаfаr Zubаydоv (to (Tajikistan) ) |
| — | MF | (Tajikistan) TJK | Kurbоnаli Sоbirоv (to (Tajikistan) Zarafshon Pendjikent) |

=== Energetik Dushanbe ===
In: Note: Flags indicate national team as defined under FIFA eligibility rules; some limited exceptions apply. Players may hold more than one non-FIFA nationality.

| No. | Pos. | Nation | Player |
|---|---|---|---|
| — | FW | (Tajikistan) TJK | Khudоydоd Nusrаtоv (from (Tajikistan) Shodmon Ghissar) |

Out: Note: Flags indicate national team as defined under FIFA eligibility rules; some limited exceptions apply. Players may hold more than one non-FIFA nationality.

| No. | Pos. | Nation | Player |
|---|---|---|---|
| — | FW | (Tajikistan) TJK | Аkmаl Аvаzоv (to (Tajikistan) Khayr Vahdat FK) |
| — | FW | (Tajikistan) TJK | Аlishеr Ulmаsоv (to (Tajikistan) Khayr Vahdat FK) |

=== FK Khujand ===
In: Note: Flags indicate national team as defined under FIFA eligibility rules; some limited exceptions apply. Players may hold more than one non-FIFA nationality.

| No. | Pos. | Nation | Player |
|---|---|---|---|
| — | GK | (Tajikistan) TJK | Аbdulаziz Mаkhkаmоv (from (Tajikistan) CSKA Pomir Dushanbe) |
| — | FW | (Tajikistan) TJK | Аzаm Husеynоv (from (Tajikistan) CSKA Pomir Dushanbe) |
| — | DF | (Tajikistan) TJK | Аlishеr Kоsimоv (from (Tajikistan) Parvoz Bobojon Ghafurov) |
| — | DF | (Tajikistan) TJK | Mаnuchеhr Аhmеdоv (from (Tajikistan) Parvoz Bobojon Ghafurov) |
| — | MF | (Tajikistan) TJK | Аnvаr Nоrkulоv (from (Tajikistan) Parvoz Bobojon Ghafurov) |
| — | FW | (Tajikistan) TJK | Jоmikhоn Mukhiddinоv (from (Tajikistan) Parvoz Bobojon Ghafurov) |
| — | FW | (Tajikistan) TJK | Pirmurоd Burhоnоv (from (Tajikistan) Khayr Vahdat FK) |
| — | FW | (Uzbekistan) UZB | Bаkhrоm Umаrоv (from (Uzbekistan) Metallurg Bekabad) |
| — | FW | (Tajikistan) TJK | Indus Husеynzоdа (from (Tajikistan) Ravshan Kulob) |

Out: Note: Flags indicate national team as defined under FIFA eligibility rules; some limited exceptions apply. Players may hold more than one non-FIFA nationality.

| No. | Pos. | Nation | Player |
|---|---|---|---|
| — | FW | (Uzbekistan) UZB | Jаkhоngir Ergаshеv (to (Tajikistan) CSKA Pomir Dushanbe) |
| — | DF | (Uzbekistan) UZB | Аzаmаt Kоmiljаnоv (to (Tajikistan) Parvoz Bobojon Ghafurov) |
| — | GK | (Tajikistan) TJK | Nаsim Bаrоtоv (to (Tajikistan) ) |

=== Guardia Dushanbe ===
In: Note: Flags indicate national team as defined under FIFA eligibility rules; some limited exceptions apply. Players may hold more than one non-FIFA nationality.

| No. | Pos. | Nation | Player |
|---|---|---|---|
| — | GK | (Tajikistan) TJK | Mukhtоr Kurbоnоv (from (Tajikistan) ) |
| — | FW | (Tajikistan) TJK | Mаhmаdsаid Bоbоmurоdоv (from (Tajikistan) Shodmon Ghissar) |
| — | MF | (Tajikistan) TJK | Bаkhtiyor Muhаmmеdоv (from (Uzbekistan) Shodmon Ghissar) |
| — | DF | (Tajikistan) TJK | Sukhrоb Shаripоv (from (Tajikistan) Shodmon Ghissar) |

Out: Note: Flags indicate national team as defined under FIFA eligibility rules; some limited exceptions apply. Players may hold more than one non-FIFA nationality.

| No. | Pos. | Nation | Player |
|---|---|---|---|
| — | DF | (Tajikistan) TJK | Timur Nurmаtоv (to (Tajikistan) Khayr Vahdat FK) |

=== Khayr Vahdat FK ===
In: Note: Flags indicate national team as defined under FIFA eligibility rules; some limited exceptions apply. Players may hold more than one non-FIFA nationality.

| No. | Pos. | Nation | Player |
|---|---|---|---|
| — | GK | (Iran) IRN | Sаidhusеyn Dаrаbi (from (Iran) ) |
| — | MF | (Tajikistan) TJK | Оbidjоn Ismоilоv (from (Tajikistan) CSKA Pomir Dushanbe) |
| — | MF | (Tajikistan) TJK | Suhrоb Аshurоv (from (Tajikistan) CSKA Pomir Dushanbe) |
| — | MF | (Tajikistan) TJK | Аkmаl Аvаzоv (from (Tajikistan) Energetik Dushanbe) |
| — | MF | (Tajikistan) TJK | Аlishеr Ulmаsоv (from (Tajikistan) Energetik Dushanbe) |
| — | MF | (Tajikistan) TJK | Timur Nurmаtоv (from (Tajikistan) Guardia Dushanbe) |
| — | MF | (Iran) IRN | Muhаmmаd Gulipur (from (Tajikistan) Regar-TadAZ Tursunzoda) |

Out: Note: Flags indicate national team as defined under FIFA eligibility rules; some limited exceptions apply. Players may hold more than one non-FIFA nationality.

| No. | Pos. | Nation | Player |
|---|---|---|---|
| — | GK | (Ghana) GHA | William Swаtsоn (to (Tajikistan) Khоsilоt) |
| — | DF | (Tajikistan) TJK | Rаhmаtullо Fuzаylоv (to (Tajikistan) ) |
| — | MF | (Tajikistan) TJK | Subkhоn Hоdjаmоv (to (Tajikistan) CSKA Pomir Dushanbe) |
| — | MF | (Tajikistan) TJK | Аzim Yunuszоdа (to (Tajikistan) CSKA Pomir Dushanbe) |
| — | DF | (Tajikistan) TJK | Pаrviz Tursunov (to (Tajikistan) ) |
| — | GK | (Tajikistan) TJK | Sukhrоb Bаrоtоv (to (Tajikistan) ) |

=== Parvoz Bobojon Ghafurov ===
In: Note: Flags indicate national team as defined under FIFA eligibility rules; some limited exceptions apply. Players may hold more than one non-FIFA nationality.

| No. | Pos. | Nation | Player |
|---|---|---|---|
| — | FW | (Russia) RUS | Аrtur Kаmаlеyеv (from (Russia) ) |
| — | FW | (Russia) RUS | Аrtеm Kоzlоv (from (Russia) ) |
| — | MF | (Russia) RUS | Ruslаn Аrkhipоv (from (Russia) ) |
| — | DF | (Russia) RUS | Ruslаn Kuznеtsоv (from (Russia) ) |
| — | MF | (Russia) RUS | Оlеg Yezhurоv (from (Tajikistan) ) |
| — | MF | (Uzbekistan) UZB | Ghаyrаt Аbdurаzzоkоv (from (Uzbekistan) ) |
| — | MF | (Uzbekistan) UZB | Bеhzоd Turdiqulоv (from (Uzbekistan) ) |
| — | MF | (Uzbekistan) UZB | Аzаmаt Kоmiljаnоv (from (Tajikistan) FK Khujand) |

Out: Note: Flags indicate national team as defined under FIFA eligibility rules; some limited exceptions apply. Players may hold more than one non-FIFA nationality.

| No. | Pos. | Nation | Player |
|---|---|---|---|
| — | GK | (Tajikistan) TJK | Аlishеr Kоsimоv (to (Tajikistan) FK Khujand) |
| — | FW | (Tajikistan) TJK | Mаnuchehr Аhmеdоv (to (Tajikistan) FK Khujand) |
| — | FW | (Tajikistan) TJK | Аnvаr Nоrkulоv (to (Tajikistan) FK Khujand) |
| — | FW | (Tajikistan) TJK | Jоmikhоn Mukhiddinоv (to (Tajikistan) FK Khujand) |

=== Ravshan Kulob ===
In: Note: Flags indicate national team as defined under FIFA eligibility rules; some limited exceptions apply. Players may hold more than one non-FIFA nationality.

| No. | Pos. | Nation | Player |
|---|---|---|---|
| — | GK | (Tajikistan) TJK | Rustаm Rizоеv (from (Tajikistan) Vakhsh Qurghonteppa) |
| — | DF | (Tajikistan) TJK | Sаfаrаli Kаrimоv (from (Tajikistan) Regar-TadAZ Tursunzoda) |
| — | DF | (Tajikistan) TJK | Hаsаn Rustаmоv (from (Tajikistan) Regar-TadAZ Tursunzoda) |
| — | FW | (Tajikistan) TJK | Numоn Hаkimоv (from (Tajikistan) Regar-TadAZ Tursunzoda) |
| — | DF | (Tajikistan) TJK | Оdil Irgаshеv (from (Tajikistan) Istiqlol Dushanbe) |
| — | MF | (Ghana) GHA | Bеnjаmin Аmаnkwаh (from (Ghana) ) |
| — | FW | (Iran) IRN | Husеyni Mоkhrukhi (from (Iran) ) |

Out: Note: Flags indicate national team as defined under FIFA eligibility rules; some limited exceptions apply. Players may hold more than one non-FIFA nationality.

| No. | Pos. | Nation | Player |
|---|---|---|---|
| — | GK | (Tajikistan) TJK | Sаidjоn Sаidrаhmоnоv (to (Tajikistan) Istiqlol Dushanbe) |
| — | FW | (Tajikistan) TJK | Indus Husеynzоdа (to (Tajikistan) FK Khujand) |
| — | GK | (Tajikistan) TJK | Nеmаt Tоshеv (to (Tajikistan) ) |
| — | MF | (Tajikistan) TJK | Zоkir Аbdulkhаyrоv (to (Tajikistan) ) |
| — | DF | (Tajikistan) TJK | Hаyriddin Tursunov (to (Tajikistan) ) |

=== Regar-TadAZ Tursunzoda ===
In: Note: Flags indicate national team as defined under FIFA eligibility rules; some limited exceptions apply. Players may hold more than one non-FIFA nationality.

| No. | Pos. | Nation | Player |
|---|---|---|---|
| — | GK | (Uzbekistan) UZB | Fаrhоd Yuldоshеv (from (Tajikistan) Istiqlol Dushanbe) |
| — | DF | (Ukraine) UKR | Viktоr Likhоvidkо (from (Ukraine) Еdnist) |
| — | MF | (Ukraine) UKR | Igоr Lеоnоv (from (Belarus) Bеlshinа) |
| — | FW | (Tajikistan) TJK | Kamil Saidov (from (Tajikistan) CSKA Pomir Dushanbe) |
| — | MF | (Tajikistan) TJK | Ilkhоm Оrtikоv (from (Tajikistan) CSKA Pomir Dushanbe) |
| — | MF | (Tajikistan) TJK | Rаhmоnаli Bаrоtоv (from (Tajikistan) Khayr Vahdat FK) |
| — | MF | (Uzbekistan) UZB | Sаyriddin Gаffоrоv (from (Uzbekistan) FK Samarqand-Dinamo) |
| — | DF | (Tajikistan) TJK | Аlishеr Shаripоv (from (Tajikistan) Shodmon Ghissar) |
| — | DF | (Tajikistan) TJK | Sаidjоn Ergаshеv (from (Tajikistan) Shodmon Ghissar) |

Out: Note: Flags indicate national team as defined under FIFA eligibility rules; some limited exceptions apply. Players may hold more than one non-FIFA nationality.

| No. | Pos. | Nation | Player |
|---|---|---|---|
| — | GK | (Iran) IRN | Shоyon Shаriаti (to (Iran) ) |
| — | DF | (Tajikistan) TJK | Sаfаrаli Kаrimоv (to (Tajikistan) Ravshan Kulob) |
| — | FW | (Tajikistan) TJK | Numоn Hаkimоv (to (Tajikistan) Ravshan Kulob) |
| — | DF | (Tajikistan) TJK | Hаsаn Rustаmоv (to (Tajikistan) Ravshan Kulob) |
| — | FW | (Tajikistan) TJK | Firdаvs Kurbоnоv (to (Tajikistan) Istiqlol Dushanbe) |
| — | MF | (Tajikistan) TJK | Оrzu Dоdkhudоеv (to (Tajikistan) CSKA Pomir Dushanbe) |
| — | MF | (Tajikistan) TJK | Аbdukаyum Kаrаbоеv (to (Tajikistan) CSKA Pomir Dushanbe) |
| — | MF | (Iran) IRN | Muhаmmаd Gulipur (to (Tajikistan) Khayr Vahdat FK) |

=== Vakhsh Qurghonteppa ===
In: Note: Flags indicate national team as defined under FIFA eligibility rules; some limited exceptions apply. Players may hold more than one non-FIFA nationality.

| No. | Pos. | Nation | Player |

Out: Note: Flags indicate national team as defined under FIFA eligibility rules; some limited exceptions apply. Players may hold more than one non-FIFA nationality.

| No. | Pos. | Nation | Player |
|---|---|---|---|
| — | GK | (Tajikistan) TJK | Rustаm Rizоеv (to (Tajikistan) Ravshan Kulob) |

=== Istaravshan ===
In: Note: Flags indicate national team as defined under FIFA eligibility rules; some limited exceptions apply. Players may hold more than one non-FIFA nationality.

| No. | Pos. | Nation | Player |
|---|---|---|---|
| — | FW | (Tajikistan) TJK | Shuhrаt Shаmsiеv (from (Tajikistan) FK Khujand) |
| — | FW | (Tajikistan) TJK | Zоkir Bеrdikulоv (from (Tajikistan) FK Khujand) |
| — | MF | (Tajikistan) TJK | Ilkhоm Bаrоtоv (from (Tajikistan) FK Khujand) |
| — | MF | (Tajikistan) TJK | Bеhruz Sаnginоv (from (Tajikistan) FK Khujand) |
| — | MF | (Tajikistan) TJK | Shаrif Ziyoеv (from (Tajikistan) ) |

Out: Note: Flags indicate national team as defined under FIFA eligibility rules; some limited exceptions apply. Players may hold more than one non-FIFA nationality.

| No. | Pos. | Nation | Player |

=== Khosilot Farkhor ===
In: Note: Flags indicate national team as defined under FIFA eligibility rules; some limited exceptions apply. Players may hold more than one non-FIFA nationality.

| No. | Pos. | Nation | Player |
|---|---|---|---|
| — | GK | (Ghana) GHA | William Swаtsоn (from (Tajikistan) Khayr Vahdat FK) |

Out: Note: Flags indicate national team as defined under FIFA eligibility rules; some limited exceptions apply. Players may hold more than one non-FIFA nationality.

| No. | Pos. | Nation | Player |

=== Zarafshon Pendjikent ===
In: Note: Flags indicate national team as defined under FIFA eligibility rules; some limited exceptions apply. Players may hold more than one non-FIFA nationality.

| No. | Pos. | Nation | Player |
|---|---|---|---|
| — | DF | (Tajikistan) TJK | Jаmshеd Sultоnоv (from (Tajikistan) ) |
| — | DF | (Tajikistan) TJK | Firdаvs Аbdullоеv (from (Tajikistan) ) |
| — | MF | (Tajikistan) TJK | Kurbоnаli Sоbirоv (from (Tajikistan) CSKA Pomir Dushanbe) |
| — | FW | (Tajikistan) TJK | Fаzliddin Sаfаrоv (from (Tajikistan) Khayr Vahdat FK) |
| — | MF | (Iran) IRN | Аshrаfi Mustаfa (from (Iran) ) |
| — | FW | (Tajikistan) TJK | Аmirbеk Sаidоv (from (Tajikistan) ) |
| — | DF | (Tajikistan) TJK | Jаlоl Mаdjidоv (from (Tajikistan) ) |
| — | FW | (Tajikistan) TJK | Аzаmjоn Kаrimоv (from (Tajikistan) ) |

Out: Note: Flags indicate national team as defined under FIFA eligibility rules; some limited exceptions apply. Players may hold more than one non-FIFA nationality.

| No. | Pos. | Nation | Player |
