= 2009 Tajikistan Cup =

2009 Tajik Cup
Tournament details
- Country: Tajikistan
- Teams: Istiklol
- Runners-up: CSKA Pamir Dushanbe

The 2009 Tajik Cup was the 18th edition of the Tajik Cup.

== First round ==
Team 1	Agg.	Team 2	1st leg	2nd leg
Guardia Dushanbe	1-5	Istiklol	1-3	0-2
Ravshan Kulob	w/o	Vakhsh Qurghonteppa	w/o	w/o

== Quarterfinals ==
Team 1	Agg.	Team 2	1st leg	2nd leg
Khujand	1-2	Energetik Dushanbe	1-0	0–2
Khayr Vahdat	2–3	CSKA Pamir Dushanbe	1–0	1–3
Vakhsh Qurghonteppa	1-3	Istiklol	0-3	1-0
Parvoz Bobojon Ghafurov	w/o	Regar-TadAZ	w/o	w/o

== Semifinals ==
Team 1	Agg.	Team 2	1st leg	2nd leg
Energetik Dushanbe	0-2	CSKA Pamir Dushanbe	0-2	0-0
Istiklol	6-3	Regar-TadAZ	3–2	3-1

== Final ==
5 October 2009
(UTC+5)

CSKA Pamir Dushanbe	1–3	Istiklol
Nakuti 20'	[ Report]	Rabiev 53' (pen.), 90'; Fatkhuloev 58'

Pamir Stadium, Dushanbe
