= 2012 Tajik League =

Tajik League
- Season: 2012
- Champions: Ravshan Kulob
- AFC Cup: Ravshan Kulob; Regar-TadAZ Tursunzoda
- Matches: 156
- Goals: 507 (3.25 per match)
- Top goalscorer: Dilshod Vasiev (24)

In the 2012 season of the Tajik League, 13 teams participated. Khosilot, Istaravshan, and Zarafshon, were newly promoted, while Shodmon Ghissar withdrew from the competition. There was a limit of eight foreign players per team, with up to five on the field at a particular time. Only Parvoz Bobojon Ghafurov had the maximum of eight foreign footballers.

The Tajikistan clubs' participation was upgraded from the AFC President's Cup to the AFC Cup starting in 2013 by the AFC, so two clubs (league champions and cup winners) went on to participate in the 2013 AFC Cup.

== Teams ==
| Club | Coach | City | Stadium | Capacity | 2011 |
|---|---|---|---|---|---|
| Energetik Dushanbe | (Tajikistan) | Dushanbe | Stadion Aeroflot | 3,000 | 4th |
| Guardia Dushanbe | (Tajikistan) Sergey Kapusta | Dushanbe | Stadion Politekhnikum | 2,000 | 11th |
| Hosilot Farkhor | (Tajikistan) | Farkhor | Stadion Farkhar | 3,000 | Promoted |
| FK Istaravshan | (Tajikistan) | Istaravshan | Istaravshan Sports Complex | 5,000 | Promoted |
| Istiqlol Dushanbe | (Serbia) Nikola Kavazović | Dushanbe | Central Republican Stadium | 21,400 | 1st Champions |
| Khayr Vahdat FK | (Tajikistan) | Vahdat | Stadion im. Safarbeka Karimova | 7,000 | 5th |
| FK Khujand | (Tajikistan) | Khujand | 20 Years of Independence Stadium | 25,000 | 7th |
| Parvoz Bobojon Ghafurov | (Tajikistan) Muhammad Djuraev | Ghafurov | Stadion Furudgokh | 5,000 | 9th |
| Ravshan Kulob | (Tajikistan) | Kulob | Langari Langarieva Stadium | 20,000 | 3rd |
| Regar-TadAZ Tursunzoda | (Tajikistan) | Tursunzoda | Stadium Metallurg 1st District | 10,000 | 2nd |
| SKA-Pamir Dushanbe | (Tajikistan) | Dushanbe | CSKA Stadium | 7,000 | 6th |
| Vakhsh Qurghonteppa | (Tajikistan) Salohiddin Ghafurov | Qurghonteppa | Tsentralnyi Stadium | 10,000 | 8th |
| Zarafshon Pendjikent | (Tajikistan) | Pendjikent | Stadion Zarafshon | 2,000 | Promoted |

== League table ==
| Pos | Team | Pld | W | D | L | GF | GA | GD | Pts | Qualification or relegation |
|---|---|---|---|---|---|---|---|---|---|---|
| 1 | Ravshan Kulob (C) | 24 | 20 | 2 | 2 | 51 | 10 | +41 | 62 | 2013 AFC Cup Group stage |
| 2 | Regar-TadAZ | 24 | 19 | 4 | 1 | 77 | 16 | +61 | 61 | 2013 AFC Cup Qualifying play-off (Note: Regar-TadAZ qualified for the 2013 AFC Cup by winning the 2012 Tajik Cup.) |
| 3 | Istiqlol Dushanbe | 24 | 16 | 5 | 3 | 76 | 13 | +63 | 53 | |
| 4 | Khayr Vahdat FK | 24 | 16 | 4 | 4 | 45 | 27 | +18 | 52 | |
| 5 | Parvoz | 24 | 10 | 4 | 10 | 47 | 36 | +11 | 34 | |
| 6 | Vakhsh | 24 | 9 | 4 | 11 | 31 | 24 | +7 | 31 | |
| 7 | SKA-Pamir Dushanbe | 24 | 8 | 6 | 10 | 26 | 25 | +1 | 30 | |
| 8 | FK Khujand | 24 | 8 | 6 | 10 | 29 | 44 | −15 | 30 | |
| 9 | FK Istaravshan | 24 | 8 | 4 | 12 | 33 | 44 | −11 | 28 | |
| 10 | Energetik Dushanbe | 24 | 7 | 6 | 11 | 35 | 34 | +1 | 27 | |
| 11 | Hosilot Farkhor | 24 | 4 | 2 | 18 | 18 | 64 | −46 | 14 | |
| 12 | Guardia Dushanbe | 24 | 4 | 0 | 20 | 18 | 72 | −54 | 12 | |
| 13 | Zarafshon Pendjikent | 24 | 1 | 3 | 20 | 21 | 98 | −77 | 6 | |

Updated to match(es) played on 29 November 2012. Source: Soccerway
Rules for classification: 1) points; 2) goal difference; 3) number of goals scored.
(C) Champions

== Results ==
| Home \ Away | ENE | GUA | HF | ID | IST | KV | KHU | PAR | RK | RTT | SPD | VAK | ZP |
|---|---|---|---|---|---|---|---|---|---|---|---|---|---|
| Energetik Dushanbe | | 2–0 | 4–0 | 0–5 | 3–2 | 1–1 | 2–2 | 2–1 | 1–2 | 0–1 | 2–0 | 0–1 | 8–0 |
| Guardia Dushanbe | 0–1 | | 4–2 | 1–6 | 2–4 | 1–3 | 3–0 (Note: Matches Gvardia-Hujand and CSKA-Pamir-Hosilot awarded 3–0 wins to home teams.) | 0–3 | 0–4 | 0–3 | 0–1 | 0–2 | 0–3 |
| Hosilot Farkhor | 1–1 | 0–1 | | 0–5 | 2–1 | 0–2 | 1–0 | 1–2 | 0–5 | 1–2 | 1–3 | 0–2 | 1–1 |
| Istiqlol Dushanbe | 1–1 | 7–0 | 4–1 | | 4–0 | 1–1 | 10–0 | 1–0 | 1–2 | 1–2 | 4–1 | 1–0 | 6–0 |
| FK Istaravshan | 0–0 (Note: Match Istaravshan-Energetik awarded 0–0 loss to both teams due to mass fight.) | 1–0 | 0–1 | 0–2 | | 1–2 | 1–2 | 1–0 | 3–1 | 1–2 | 1–0 | 2–1 | 4–1 |
| Khayr Vahdat FK | 4–1 | 2–1 | 2–1 | 1–1 | 4–1 | | 2–0 | 2–0 | 1–2 | 1–0 | 2–0 | 1–0 | 3–0 |
| FK Khujand | 2–1 | 4–1 | 1–0 | 0–1 | 2–2 | 0–2 | | 1–1 | 0–1 | 3–3 | 0–0 | 1–0 | 5–2 |
| Parvoz | 2–1 | 1–0 | 6–1 | 0–3 | 2–2 | 5–2 | 2–3 | | 2–2 | 1–2 | 2–1 | 0–1 | 6–0 |
| Ravshan Kulob | 2–0 | 3–0 | 2–1 | 1–0 | 5–0 | 4–0 | 3–0 | 1–0 | | 0–0 | 1–0 | 3–0 | 2–0 |
| Regar-TadAZ | 3–1 | 11–0 | 9–1 | 0–0 | 5–1 | 5–2 | 2–0 | 4–1 | 1–0 | | 2–0 | 1–0 | 12–0 |
| SKA-Pamir Dushanbe | 1–0 | 4–0 | 3–0 | 1–1 | 1–1 | 0–0 | 3–1 | 0–0 | 0–1 | 0–2 | | 0–3 | 5–0 |
| Vakhsh | 1–1 | 4–1 | 3–0 | 0–1 | 1–1 | 1–2 | 0–0 | 3–4 | 0–1 | 1–1 | 0–1 | | 4–0 |
| Zarafshon Pendjikent | 2–2 | 1–3 | 1–2 | 1–10 | 1–3 | 1–3 | 1–2 | 2–6 | 0–3 | 1–4 | 1–1 | 2–3 | |

Source: Soccerway
Legend: Blue = home team win; Yellow = draw; Red = away team win.

== Top goal-scorers ==
The top scorers were:

| Rank | Scorer | Club | Goals (Pen.) |
|---|---|---|---|
| 1 | (Tajikistan) Dilshod Vasiev | Istiqlol Dushanbe | 24 |
| 2 | (Tajikistan) Kamil Saidov | Regar-TadAZ Tursunzoda | 20 |
| 3 | (Tajikistan) Akhtam Khamrakulov | Regar-TadAZ Tursunzoda | 18 |
| 4 | (Tajikistan) Mirzobek Mirzoev | Khayr Vahdat FK | 17 |
| 5 | (Tajikistan) Numonjon Hakimov | Ravshan Kulob | 12 |
| 6 | (Tajikistan) Shodibek Gafforov | Energetik Dushanbe | 11 |
| 6 | (Tajikistan) Mansur Khakimov | Parvoz Bobojon Ghafurov | 11 |

=== Hat-tricks ===
| Player | For | Against | Result | Date |
|---|---|---|---|---|
| (Tajikistan) Hindus Huseynzoda | Khujand | Guardia | 4–1 | 15 April 2012 |
| (Tajikistan) Davronjon Tukhtasunov | Regar-TadAZ | Istaravshan | 5–1 | 3 June 2012 |
| (Tajikistan) Jamshed Ismailov | Regar-TadAZ | Energetik | 3–1 | 30 June 2012 |
| (Tajikistan) Nowruz Rustamov | Ravshan | Vakhsh | 3–1 | 3 October 2012 |
| (Tajikistan) Kamil Saidov^{6} | Regar-TadAZ | Zarafshon | 12–0 | 9 October 2012 |
| (Tajikistan) Akhtam Khamrakulov^{4} | Regar-TadAZ | Hosilot | 12–0 | 20 October 2012 |
| (Tajikistan) Dilshod Vasiev^{4} | Istiklol | Zarafshon | 10–1 | 24 October 2012 |
| (Tajikistan) Mirzobek Mirzoev | Khayr | Energetik | 4–1 | 25 October 2012 |
| (Tajikistan) Jahongir Ergashev | Istiklol | Guardia | 7–0 | 27 October 2012 |
| (Tajikistan) Shudzhoat Nematov^{4} | Energetik | Zarafshon | 8–0 | 12 November 2012 |
| (Tajikistan) Kamil Saidov^{5} | Regar-TadAZ | Guardia | 12–0 | 18 November 2012 |
| (Tajikistan) Dilshod Vasiev^{4} | Istiklol | Khujand | 10–0 | 22 November 2012 |
| (Tajikistan) Farkhod Tokhirov | Istiklol | Khujand | 10–0 | 22 November 2012 |

- ^{4} Player scored 4 goals
- ^{5} Player scored 5 goals
- ^{6} Player scored 6 goals
