= 2015 Tajikistan Cup =

2015 Tajik Cup
Tournament details
- Country: Tajikistan
- Teams: 16

Final positions
- Champions: Istiklol (5th title)
- Runners-up: Regar-TadAZ

Tournament statistics
- Matches played: 29
- Goals scored: 129 (4.45 per match)

The 2015 Tajik Cup was the 24th edition of the Tajik Cup. The cup winner qualified for the 2016 AFC Cup.

== Last 16 ==
25 July 2015 1st leg	Istiklol	5–0	Parvoz	Dushanbe
(UTC+5)	Umarbayev 8'; Nazarov 16' (pen.); Fatkhuloev 58', 90+1'; Dzhalilov 69'	Summary		Stadium: Republican Stadium; Attendance: 200; Referee: Shavkat Akhmedov

5 August 2015 2nd leg	Parvoz	1–3 (1–8 agg.)	Istiklol	Ghafurov
(UTC+5)	Zokirov 44'	Summary	Vasiev 4'; Safarov 5'; Dzhalilov 54'	Stadium: Furudgoh Stadium; Attendance: 300; Referee: Hurshed Dadoboev

25 July 2015 1st leg	Khujand	9–1	Candi	Khujand
(UTC+5)	Khamrakulov 7', 28'; Karimov 19', 36'; Mirzohon 24'; Ergashev 41', 45'; Karimdzhon 66'; Bozorov 74'	Summary	Aziz 60'	Stadium: 20 Years of Independence Stadium; Attendance: 2,000; Referee: Hurshed Dadoboev

4 August 2015 2nd leg	Candi	0–6 (1–15 agg.)	Khujand	Konibodom
(UTC+5)		Summary	Bozorov 6', 16', 21', 43'; Rakhimov 52'; Tokhirov 61'	Stadium: Youth Stadium; Attendance: 1,200; Referee: Naim Mansurov

25 July 2015 1st leg	Panjshir	2–2	CSKA Pamir Dushanbe	Kolkhozobod
(UTC+5)		Summary		Stadium: Panjshir Uktam Mamatova

5 August 2015 2nd leg	CSKA Pamir Dushanbe	6–0 (8–2 agg.)	Panjshir	Dushanbe
(UTC+5)	Encodes 3'; Napoleon 32', 45'; Tolibov 45+3'; Tukhtasunov 77' (pen.), 82'	Summary		Stadium: CSKA Stadium; Attendance: 100; Referee: Parviz Murtazoev

25 July 2015 1st leg	Saroykamar Panj	1–2	Khayr Vahdat	Kumsangir
(UTC+5)	Vakhobov 80'	Summary	Sohibnazar 28'; Muzaffarov 53'	Stadium: Central Stadium; Attendance: 3,000; Referee: Dilovarshoh Orzu

5 August 2015 2nd leg	Khayr Vahdat	0–2 (2–3 agg.)	Saroykamar Panj	Dushanbe
(UTC+5)		Summary	Mamadkulov 33'; Gafforov 59'	Stadium: Aviator Stadium; Attendance: 1,500; Referee: Azamdzhon Buriev

26 July 2015 1st leg	CSKA Dushanbe	0–9	Ravshan	Dushanbe
(UTC+5)		Summary	Amrohon 3'; Gafforov 16', 32', 78'; Qalandarov 20'; Gershon 29'; Rakhmonov 63'; Rustamov 73', 77'	Stadium: Republican Stadium; Attendance: 2,200; Referee: Akobir Fayzullozoda

5 August 2015 2nd leg	Ravshan	4–2 (13–2 agg.)	CSKA Dushanbe	Kulob
(UTC+5)	Rakhmonov 5'; Gafforov 47', 57'; Gershon 53'	Summary	Kamchinov 80', 85'	Stadium: Central Stadium; Attendance: 2,000; Referee: Nasrullo Kabirov

26 July 2015 1st leg	Daleron-Uroteppa	0–2	Barki Tajik	Istaravshan
(UTC+5)		Summary	Safarov 15'; Shohzukhurov 90+2'	Stadium: Central Stadium; Attendance: 3,000; Referee: Bahram Sadulloev

4 August 2016 2nd leg	Barki Tajik	1–2 (3–2 agg.)	Daleron-Uroteppa	Dushanbe
(UTC+5)	Yusupov 11'	Summary	Boboev 20', 52'	Stadium: Republican Stadium; Attendance: 200; Referee: Sayëdzhon Zayniddinov

26 July 2015 1st leg	Chashma	3–5	Regar-TadAZ	Shaartuz
(UTC+5)	Hamroev 23'; Nuraliev 26'; Khodzhaev 86'	Summary	Saidov 29' (pen.), 72'; Tursunov 41'; Bobojonov 84'; Choriyev 90+4'	Stadium: Pakhtakor Stadium; Attendance: 1,000; Referee: Parviz Murtazoev

5 August 2015 2nd leg	Regar-TadAZ	7–0 (12–3 agg.)	Chashma	Tursunzoda
(UTC+5)	Sharipov 6' (o.g.); Bobojonov 34', 89'; Payzov 40', 87'; Saidov 58', 83'	Summary		Stadium: Stadium Metallurg 1st District; Attendance: 1,000; Referee: Umed Rahimov

26 July 2015 1st leg	Vakhsh Qurghonteppa	7–0	Isfara	Qurghonteppa
(UTC+5)	Musoev 15' (o.g.); Davlatmir 20', 84'; Hassan 35'; Saidov 39', 85'; Malodustov 40'	Summary		Stadium: Tsentralnyi Stadium; Attendance: Sayëdzhon Zayniddinov; Referee: 200

5 August 2015 2nd leg	Isfara	1–2 (1–9 agg.)	Vakhsh Qurghonteppa	Isfara
(UTC+5)	Musoev 60'	Summary	Karimov 80'; Panjshanbe 90'	Stadium: Central Stadium; Attendance: 2,000; Referee: Murod Kurbanov

== Quarterfinal ==
12 August 2015 1st leg	Istiklol	6–1	Khujand	Dushanbe
17:00 (UTC+5)	Fatkhuloev 31', 36'; Vasiev 44', 69'; Dzhalilov 74'; Jalilov 86'	Summary	Khamrakulov 13'	Stadium: Republican Stadium; Attendance: 500; Referee: Sayëdzhon Zayniddinov

19 August 2015 2nd leg	Khujand	0–0 (1–6 agg.)	Istiklol	Khujand
16:30 (UTC+5)		Summary		Stadium: 20 Years of Independence Stadium; Attendance: 1,000; Referee: Bahram Sadulloev

20 August 2015 1st leg	CSKA Pamir Dushanbe	3–2	Barki Tajik	Dushanbe
17:00 (UTC+5)	Mirzonadzhot 5'; Qosimov 7'; Tukhtasunov 9' (pen.)	Summary	Shohzukhurov 11'; Leaks 57'	Stadium: CSKA Stadium

25 August 2015 2nd leg	Barki Tajik	1–5 (3–8 agg.)	CSKA Pamir Dushanbe	Dushanbe
16:30 (UTC+5)	Leaks 90+2'	Summary	Tukhtasunov 6', 57', 63', 82'; Qosimov 45+2'	Stadium: Republican Stadium; Attendance: 300; Referee: Hurshed Dadoboev

20 August 2015 1st leg	Ravshan Kulob	2–1	Vakhsh Qurghonteppa	Kulob
17:00 (UTC+5)	Qalandarov 7'; Husseini 79'	Summary	Saidov 56' (pen.)	Stadium: Kulob Central Stadium

25 August 2015 2nd leg	Vakhsh Qurghonteppa	0–0 (1–2 agg.)	Ravshan Kulob	Qurghonteppa
16:30 (UTC+5)		Summary		Stadium: Tsentralnyi Stadium

20 August 2015 1st leg	Regar-TadAZ	3–0	Saroykamar Panj	Tursunzoda
17:00 (UTC+5)	Choriyev 12'; Bobojonov 65', 89'	Summary		Stadium: Stadium Metallurg 1st District

25 August 2015 2nd leg	Saroykamar Panj	1–1 (1–4 agg.)	Regar-TadAZ	Kumsangir
16:30 (UTC+5)	Dadoboev 12'	Summary	Mahamadov 84'	Stadium: Central Stadium; Attendance: 3,000; Referee: Parviz Murtazoev

== Semifinals ==
22 September 2015 1st leg	Istiklol	7–0	Ravshan Kulob	Dushanbe
16:00 (UTC+5)	Makhmudov 7'; Vasiev 15'; Fatkhuloev 39'; Nazarov 45'; Asrori 58'; Umarbayev 63'; Dzhalilov 80'	Summary		Stadium: Republican Stadium; Attendance: 2,000; Referee: Dilovar Orzu

25 September 2015 2nd leg	Ravshan Kulob	0–3 (0–10 agg.)	Istiklol	Kulob
(UTC+5)		Summary	Fuzaylov 20'; Ballester 41'; Nazarov 90+2'	Stadium: Kulob Central Stadium; Attendance: 7,000; Referee: Sayëdzhon Zayniddinov

20 September 2015 1st leg	CSKA Pamir Dushanbe	0–0	Regar-TadAZ	Dushanbe
(UTC+5)		Summary		Stadium: CSKA Stadium; Attendance: 700; Referee: Parviz Murtazoev

1 October 2015 2nd leg	Regar-TadAZ	3–1 (3–1 agg.)	CSKA Pamir Dushanbe	Tursunzoda
(UTC+5)	Saidov 11'; Tursunov 17'; Bobojonov 86' (pen.)	Summary	Kovussho 48'	Stadium: Stadium Metallurg 1st District

== Final ==
28 November 2015
14:00 (UTC+5)

Istiklol	2–2 (a.e.t.)	Regar-TadAZ
J.Jalilov (yellow card) 4'; Davronov (yellow card) 30' (goal) 104'; Vasiev (yellow card) 45+2' (goal) 96'; Fuzaylov (yellow card) 74'; Manuel Bleda (yellow card) 90+1'	Summary	Karaev (yellow card) 3' (goal) 104'; Bobomurodov (yellow card) 26'; Bobojonov 114'
Penalties
Nazarov (penalty scored); Umarbayev (penalty scored); Fatkhuloev (penalty missed); Davronov (penalty scored); Ballester (penalty scored); Bleda (penalty scored); Vasiev (penalty scored)	6–5	(penalty scored) Bobojonov; (penalty missed) Karaev; (penalty scored) Tursunov; (penalty scored) Sharipov; (penalty scored) Holbeck; (penalty scored) Abdugaffor; (penalty missed) Asimov

Central Republican Stadium, Dushanbe
Attendance: 3,500
Referee: Dilovarshoh Orzu

GK	16	(Tajikistan) Alisher Tuychiev
DF	6	(Spain) José Ballester
DF	15	(Ukraine) Petro Kovalchuk
DF	20	(Tajikistan) Ziёvuddin Fuzaylov	(yellow card) 74'
MF	8	(Tajikistan) Nuriddin Davronov	(yellow card) 30'
MF	9	(Tajikistan) Khurshed Makhmudov		(substituted off) 79'
MF	11	(Tajikistan) Jakhongir Jalilov	(yellow card) 4'	(substituted off) 91'
MF	18	(Tajikistan) Fatkhullo Fatkhuloev
MF	39	(Tajikistan) Parvizdzhon Umarbayev
FW	10	(Spain) Manolo Bleda	(yellow card) 90+1'
FW	17	(Tajikistan) Dilshod Vasiev	(yellow card) 45+2'
Substitutes:
GK	35	(Tajikistan) Kurban Boboev
DF	2	(Tajikistan) Siyovush Asrorov
MF	7	(Tajikistan) Umedzhon Sharipov
FW	12	(Tajikistan) Amirdzhon Safarov
DF	19	(Tajikistan) Akhtam Nazarov		(substituted on) 79'
MF	21	(Tajikistan) Romish Jalilov		(substituted on) 91'
DF	22	(Iran) Mehdi Chahjouyi
Manager:
(Tajikistan) Mubin Ergashev

GK	16	(Tajikistan) Alisher Dodov
DF	14	(Tajikistan) Oibek Abdugaffor
DF	18	(Tajikistan) Akbar Bobomurodov	(yellow card) 26'	(substituted off) 84'
DF	20	(Tajikistan) Bakhtiyor Asimov
DF	24	(Tajikistan) Daler Tukhtasunov		(substituted off) 115'
MF	7	(Tajikistan) Rasul Payzov
MF	8	(Tajikistan) Firuz Karaev	(yellow card) 3'
MF	10	(Tajikistan) Faridoon Sharipov
MF	13	(Tajikistan) Nozim Babadjanov
FW	21	(Tajikistan) Komron Tursunov
FW	22	(Tajikistan) Kamil Saidov
Substitutes:
GK	25	(Tajikistan) Vladimir Sysoev
DF	3	(Tajikistan) Farhad Holbeck		(substituted on) 84'
DF	5	(Tajikistan) Alisher Sharipov
DF	6	(Tajikistan) Farrukh Choriyev		(substituted on) 115'
	9	(Tajikistan) Sherzod Muhamadiev
MF	12	(Tajikistan) Muzaffar Sirodzhiddin
FW	15	(Tajikistan) Numon Zokirov
Manager:
(Tajikistan) Alisher Hakberdiev

== Scorers ==
7 goals:

- (Tajikistan) Davronjon Tukhtasunov - CSKA Pamir
- (Tajikistan) Nozim Babadjanov - Regar-TadAZ

5 goals:

- (Tajikistan) Fatkhullo Fatkhuloev - Istiklol
- (Tajikistan) Dilshod Vasiev - Istiklol
- (Tajikistan) Dilshod Bozorov - Khujand
- (Tajikistan) Shodibek Gafforov - Ravshan Kulob
- (Tajikistan) Kamil Saidov - Regar-TadAZ

4 goals:

- (Tajikistan) Manuchekhr Dzhalilov - Istiklol

3 goals:

- (Tajikistan) Akhtam Nazarov - Istiklol
- (Tajikistan) Akhtam Khamrakulov - Khujand
- (Tajikistan) Karomatullo Saidov - Vakhsh Qurghonteppa

2 goals:

- (Tajikistan) Samad Shohzukhurov - Barki Tajik
- (Ghana) Solomon Takyi - Barki Tajik
- (Tajikistan) Avaz Kamchinov - CSKA Dushanbe
- (Ghana) Andoh Napoleon - CSKA Pamir
- (Tajikistan) Shamsiddin Qosimov - CSKA Pamir
- (Tajikistan) Unknown - CSKA Pamir
- (Tajikistan) Mehrullo Boboev - Daleron-Uroteppa
- (Tajikistan) Parvizdzhon Umarbayev - Istiklol
- (Tajikistan) Dzhakhongir Ergashev - Khujand
- (Tajikistan) Dilshod Karimov - Khujand
- (Tajikistan) Unknown - Panjshir
- (Ghana) Akuffo Gershon Kwasi - Ravshan Kulob
- (Tajikistan) Bakhtiyor Qalandarov - Ravshan Kulob
- (Tajikistan) Abdurasul Rakhmonov - Ravshan Kulob
- (Tajikistan) Navruz Rustamov - Ravshan Kulob
- (Tajikistan) Farrukh Choriyev - Regar-TadAZ
- (Tajikistan) Rasul Payzov - Regar-TadAZ
- (Tajikistan) Komron Tursunov - Regar-TadAZ
- (Tajikistan) Tabrezi Davlatmir - Vakhsh Qurghonteppa

1 goals:

- (Tajikistan) Mehrodzhiddin Muzaffarov - Barki Tajik
- (Tajikistan) Vaysiddin Safarov - Barki Tajik
- (Tajikistan) Vohid Sohibnazar - Barki Tajik
- (Tajikistan) Firuz Yusupov - Barki Tajik
- (Tajikistan) Bakhronov Aziz - Candi
- (Tajikistan) Azam Hamroev - Chashma
- (Tajikistan) Jamoliddin Khodzhaev - Chashma
- (Tajikistan) Amine Nuraliev - Chashma
- (Tajikistan) Furugh Encodes - CSKA Pamir
- (Tajikistan) Sayod Kovussho - CSKA Pamir
- (Tajikistan) Komron Mirzonadzhot - CSKA Pamir
- (Tajikistan) Rustam Tolibov - CSKA Pamir
- (Tajikistan) Firdaus Musoev - Isfara
- (Tajikistan) Siyovush Asrori - Istiklol
- (Spain) José Ballester - Istiklol
- (Tajikistan) Nuriddin Davronov - Istiklol
- (Tajikistan) Ziёvuddin Fuzaylov - Istiklol
- (Tajikistan) Romish Jalilov - Istiklol
- (Tajikistan) Khurshed Makhmudov - Istiklol
- (Tajikistan) Amirdzhon Safarov - Istiklol
- (Tajikistan) Ikrom Karimdzhon - Khujand
- (Tajikistan) Komron Mirzohon - Khujand
- (Tajikistan) Amir Rakhimov - Khujand
- (Tajikistan) Farkhod Tokhirov - Khujand
- (Tajikistan) Bahtovar Zokirov - Parvoz Bobojon Ghafurov
- (Tajikistan) Saidhoni Amrohon - Ravshan Kulob
- (Iran) Hossein Sohrabi - Ravshan Kulob
- (Tajikistan) Firuz Karaev - Regar-TadAZ
- (Tajikistan) Sherzod Mahamadov - Regar-TadAZ
- (Tajikistan) Hurshed Dadoboev - Saroykamar Panj
- (Tajikistan) Jonibek Gafforov - Saroykamar Panj
- (Tajikistan) Naseem Mamadkulov - Saroykamar Panj
- (Tajikistan) Sohibdzhon Vakhobov - Saroykamar Panj
- (Tajikistan) Muhammadjon Hassan - Vakhsh Qurghonteppa
- (Tajikistan) Otabek Karimov - Vakhsh Qurghonteppa
- (Tajikistan) Himatullo Malodustov - Vakhsh Qurghonteppa
- (Tajikistan) Ehson Panjshanbe - Vakhsh Qurghonteppa

Own goals:

- (Tajikistan) Firdaus Musoev (26 July 2015 vs Vakhsh Qurghonteppa)
- (Tajikistan) Umed Sharipov (5 August 2015 vs Regar-TadAZ)
