= 2006 AFC Challenge Cup final =

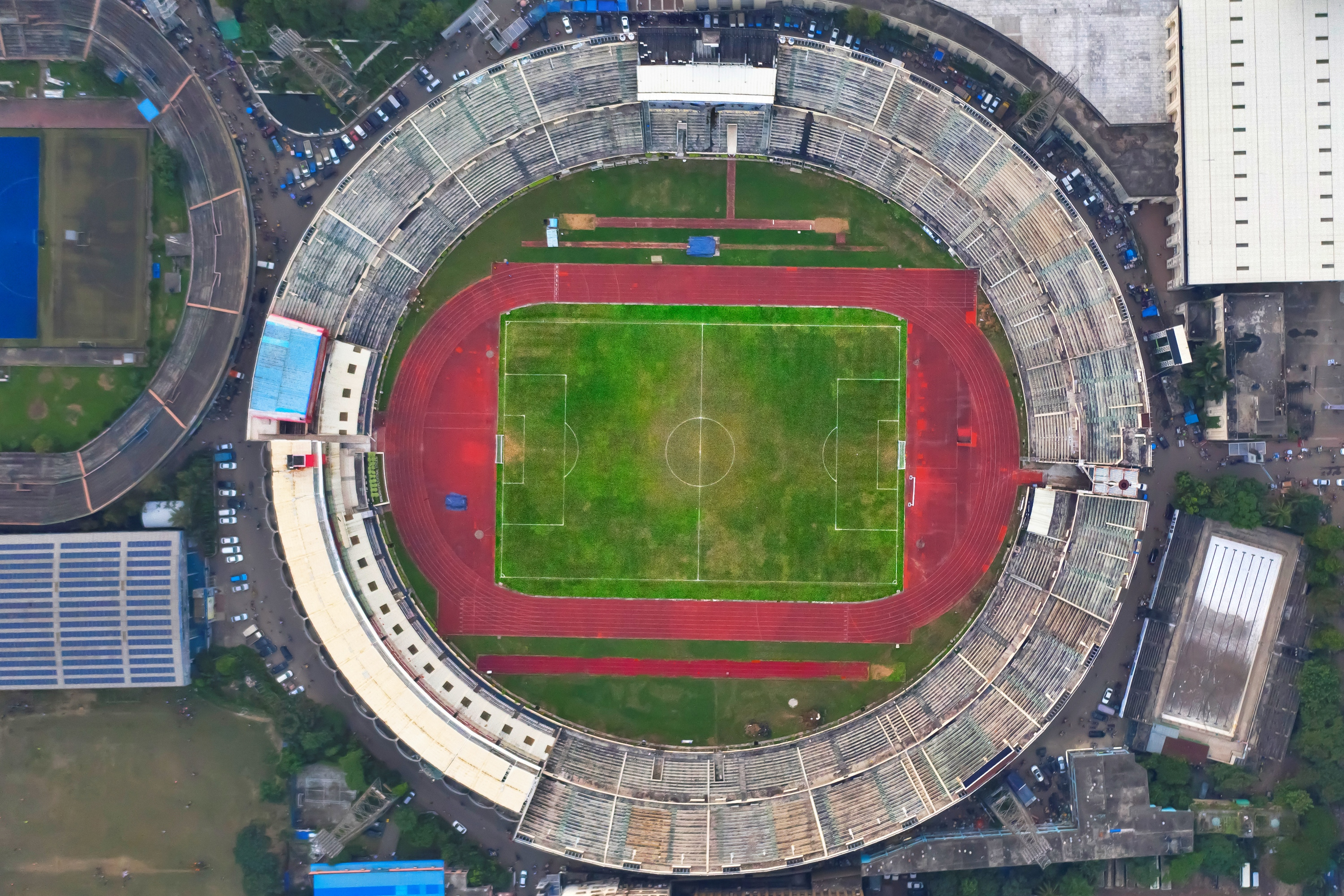
- Bangabandhu National Stadium, where the final was played
- Event: 2006 AFC Challenge Cup
Sri Lanka	Tajikistan
	(Tajikistan)
0	4
- Date: 16 April 2006
- Venue: Bangabandhu National Stadium, Dhaka
- Referee: Hedayat Mombini (Iran)
- Attendance: 2,000

The 2006 AFC Challenge Cup final was a football match that took place on 16 April 2006 at the Bangabandhu National Stadium in Dhaka to determine the winner of the 2006 AFC Challenge Cup.

== Route to the final ==
Sri Lanka
Round
Tajikistan
Opponent
Result
Group stage
Opponent
Result
Brunei
1–0
Match 1
Macau
4–0
Bhutan
1–0
Match 2
Pakistan
2–0
Nepal
1–1
Match 3
Kyrgyzstan
0–1
Group B first place

Team	Pld	W	D	L	GF	GA	GD	Pts
Sri Lanka	3	2	1	0	3	1	+2	7
Nepal	3	1	1	1	4	3	+1	4
Brunei	3	1	1	1	2	2	0	4
Bhutan	3	0	1	2	0	3	−3	1

Source: RSSSF
Final standing
Group D first place

Team	Pld	W	D	L	GF	GA	GD	Pts
Tajikistan	3	2	0	1	6	1	+5	6
Kyrgyzstan	3	2	0	1	3	1	+2	6
Pakistan	3	1	1	1	3	4	−1	4
Macau	3	0	1	2	2	8	−6	1

Source: RSSSF
Opponent
Result
Knockout phase
Opponent
Result
Chinese Taipei
3–0
Quarter-finals
Bangladesh
6–1
Nepal
1–1 (5–3 p)
Semi-finals
Kyrgyzstan
2–0

== Match ==
16 April 2006
15:30

Sri Lanka	0–4	Tajikistan
	Report	Mukhidinov 1', 61', 71' (Note: Although the match summary indicates that Mukhidinov scored three goals, a match review article published by the AFC on 19 April 2006 indicates that he only scored two goals while teammate Numonjon Hakimov scored one goal.); Mahmudov 45'

Bangabandhu Stadium, Dhaka
Attendance: 2,000
Referee: Hedayat Mombini (Iran)

== See also ==
- 2006 AFC Challenge Cup
