= 2008 Tajik League =

Tajik League
- Season: 2008
- Champions: Regar-TadAZ
- Matches: 220
- Goals: 685 (3.11 per match)
- Top goalscorer: Numonjon Hakimov (30)

The 2009 Tajik League was the 17th season of Tajik League, the Tajikistan Football Federation's top division of association football. Regar-TadAZ retained their championship, having won the previous season.

== Table ==
Pos	Team	Pld	W	D	L	GF	GA	GD	Pts
1	Regar-TadAZ (C)	40	32	5	3	129	36	+93	101
2	Parvoz Bobojon Ghafurov	40	28	6	6	89	29	+60	90
3	Khujand	40	28	4	8	71	33	+38	88
4	Vakhsh Qurghonteppa	40	21	3	16	59	46	+13	66
5	Energetik Dushanbe	40	20	5	15	73	49	+24	65
6	Dynamo Dushanbe	40	16	11	13	56	50	+6	59
7	Tajik Telecom Qurghonteppa	40	18	2	20	67	68	−1	56
8	Saroykamar Panj	40	8	5	27	43	91	−48	29 (Note: CSKA Pamir Dushanbe and Saroykamar Panj withdrew in November and had their remaining matches awarded 0-3 against them.)
9	Guardia Dushanbe	40	7	7	26	34	82	−48	28
10	Ravshan Kulob	40	7	6	27	43	103	−60	27 (Note: Hima Dushanbe withdrew before the start of the season and were replaced by Ravshan Kulob.)
11	CSKA Pamir Dushanbe	40	7	2	31	21	98	−77	23

Updated to match(es) played on 13 October 2015. Source: RSSF
Rules for classification: 1) points; 2) goal difference; 3) number of goals scored.
(C) Champions

== Top scorers ==
Rank	Player	Club	Goals
1	(Tajikistan) Numonjon Hakimov	Parvoz Bobojon Ghafurov	30
