= Naim Ulmasov =

Tajikistani footballer

Personal information
- Full name: Naim Ulmasov (Tajik: Наим Улмасов)
- Date of birth: 26 April 1992 (age 34)
- Place of birth: Tajikistan
- Height: 1.85 m (6 ft 1 in)
- Position: Defender

Senior career*
Years	Team	Apps	(Gls)
2009–2013	Vakhsh		
2013–2014	Istiklol	20	(1)

International career^{‡}
2014–	Tajikistan U23	3	(0)
2012–	Tajikistan	8	(0)
- * Club domestic league appearances and goals as of 19 April 2016 ‡ National team caps and goals as of 15 December 2014

Naim Ulmasov (Tajik: Наим Ӯлмасов; born 26 April 1992) is a Tajikistani football player who last played for FC Istiklol, and the Tajikistan national football team.

== Career ==
He previously played for Vakhsh Qurghonteppa. In December 2014, Ulmasov was made available for loan by Istiklol.

== Career statistics ==
=== Club ===
As of match played 22 November 2014

Appearances and goals by club, season and competition
Club	Season	League			National Cup		Continental		Other		Total	
Club	Season	Division	Apps	Goals	Apps	Goals	Apps	Goals	Apps	Goals	Apps	Goals
Istiklol	2013	Tajik League	13	1			–		–		13	1
Istiklol	2014	Tajik League	7	0	3	0	–		0	0	10	0
Istiklol	Total		20	1	3	0	-	-	0	0	23	0
Career total			20	1	3	0	-	-	0	0	23	0

=== International ===
Tajikistan national team
Year	Apps	Goals
2012	1	0
2013	3	0
2014	4	0
Total	8	0

Statistics accurate as of match played 4 September 2014

== Honors ==
Istiklol

- Tajik League (1): 2014
- Tajik Cup (1): 2013, 2014
- Tajik Supercup (1) : 2014
