= 2009 Tajik League =

Tajik League
- Season: 2009
- Champions: Vakhsh Qurghonteppa
- Relegated: Guardia Dushanbe; Spitamen
- AFC President's Cup: Vakhsh Qurghonteppa
- Top goalscorer: Numonjon Hakimov (15)

The 2009 Tajik League was the 18th season of Tajik League, the Tajikistan Football Federation's top division of association football. Regar-TadAZ were the defending champions, having won the previous season.

== Teams ==
Locations of teams in the 2009 Tajik League

Team	Location	Venue	Capacity
CSKA Pamir Dushanbe	Dushanbe	Central Republican Stadium	24,000
Energetik	Dushanbe	Central Republican Stadium	24,000
Gvardia	Dushanbe		
Istiklol	Dushanbe	Central Republican Stadium	24,000
Khujand	Khujand	20-Letie Nezavisimosti Stadium	25,000
Parvoz Bobojon	Ghafurov	Furudgoh Stadium	5,000
Ravshan	Kulob	Kulob Central Stadium	20,000
Regar-TadAZ	Tursunzoda	Stadium Metallurg 1st District	10,000
Spitamen	Navkat		
Vakhsh	Qurghonteppa	Tsentralnyi Stadium	10,000

== League table ==
Pos	Team	Pld	W	D	L	GF	GA	GD	Pts	Qualification
1	Vakhsh	18	15	1	2	44	15	+29	46	2010 AFC President's Cup
2	Regar-TadAZ	18	13	2	3	47	14	+33	41	
3	Khujand	18	13	1	4	36	15	+21	40	
4	Istiklol	18	11	3	4	41	18	+23	36	
5	Energetik	18	10	2	6	41	26	+15	32	
6	Parvoz Bobojon	18	7	4	7	27	22	+5	25	
7	Ravshan	18	5	2	11	25	45	−20	17	
8	CSKA Pamir	18	2	2	14	16	42	−26	8	
9	Gvardia (R)	18	2	2	14	10	55	−45	8	Relegation
10	Spitamen (Note: Round 10–18 matches involving Spitamen were all declared 3–0 forfeits in favor of the remaining 9 teams.) (R)	18	1	3	14	9	44	−35	6	Relegation

Updated to match(es) played on 14 November 2009. Source: RSSSF
Rules for classification: 1) Points; 2) Head-to-head points; 3) Head-to-head goal difference; 4) Head-to-head goals scored; 5) Goal difference; 6) Goals scored.
(R) Relegated

== Fixtures and results ==
=== Rounds 1–18 ===
Home \ Away	CPD	ENG	GVA	IST	KJD	PAV	RAV	REG	SPI	VAK
CSKA Pamir	—	1–2	3–0	0–1	0–2	1–3	1–3	1–4	1–1	0–2
Energetik	4–0	—	7–1	0–0	1–0	1–2	2–2	3–2	5–1	0–1
Gvardia	1–1	0–4	—	0–2	0–6	0–3	2–1	0–3	3–0	1–3
Istiklol	3–2	2–0	6–1	—	2–1	3–0	2–0	1–1	3–0	2–2
Khujand	2–0	3–2	3–0	2–1	—	1–0	3–0	2–0	3–0	1–0
Parvoz Bobojon	4–0	0–1	0–0	4–1	1–3	—	3–0	1–1	3–0	2–3
Ravshan	3–1	1–3	3–1	0–8	0–3	1–1	—	1–2	4–1	0–3
Regar-TadAZ	2–0	4–2	4–0	1–0	5–0	4–0	6–1	—	2–0	3–1
Spitamen	0–3	0–3	4–0	2–3	0–0	0–0	0–3	0–3	—	0–3
Vakhsh	5–1	6–1	2–0	2–1	3–1	2–0	3–2	1–0	2–0	—

Updated to match(es) played on 14 November 2009. Source: RSSSF
Legend: Blue = home team win; Yellow = draw; Red = away team win.

=== By match played ===
Team ╲ Round	1	2	3	4	5	6	7	8	9	10	11	12	13	14	15	16	17	18
CSKA Pamir	D	L	L	L	D	L	L	L	L	L	L	L	L	W	L	L	L	W
Energetik	L	L	W	L	L	L	D	W	W	W	W	W	W	L	D	W	W	W
Gvardia	D	D	L	L	L	L	L	L	W	L	L	L	L	L	W	L	L	L
Istiklol	W	D	L	W	W	W	L	D	W	W	L	W	W	W	D	W	L	W
Khujand	W	D	W	L	W	W	W	W	W	W	W	W	L	W	W	L	W	L
Parvoz Bobojon	W	D	W	D	D	D	W	L	L	L	L	L	W	L	W	W	W	L
Ravshan	L	W	L	D	L	L	D	W	L	W	W	L	L	L	L	L	W	L
Regar-TadAZ	L	W	W	W	D	W	W	D	W	L	W	W	W	W	W	W	L	W
Spitamen	L	D	L	W	D	D	L	L	L	L	L	L	L	L	L	L	L	L
Vakhsh	W	D	W	W	W	W	W	W	L	W	W	W	W	W	L	W	W	W

Updated to match(es) played on 14 November 2009. Source: https://www.rsssf.org/tablest/taji09.html
W = Win; D = Draw; L = Loss

== Season statistics ==
=== Top scorers ===
As of match played 14 November 2009

Rank	Player	Club	Goals
1	(Tajikistan) Numonjon Hakimov	Vakhsh Qurghonteppa	15
2	(Tajikistan) Yusuf Rabiev	Istiklol	14
3	(Tajikistan) Sukhrob Khamidov	Energetik	13
4	(Tajikistan) Khurshed Makhmudov	Regar-TadAZ	10
5	(Tajikistan) Pyrmurod Burkhonov	Khujand	9
6	(Tajikistan) Bahodur Sharipov	Khujand	8
7	(Tajikistan) Rustam Usmonov	Vakhsh Qurghonteppa	7
7	(Tajikistan) Shodibek Gafforov	Energetik	7
7	(Tajikistan) Dilshod Vasiev	Istiklol	7
7	(Tajikistan) Sherali Azizov	Ravshan	7
