= FK Spitamen =

- Full name: FK Spitamen
- Founded: 2005
- Ground: Navkat, Tajikistan
- League: Tajik League
- 2009: 10th

FK Spitamen is football club based in Navkat, Tajikistan, who've competed only once in the Tajik League, the top flight of football in Tajikistan, during the 2009 season.

== History ==
=== Domestic history ===
Season	League									Tajik Cup	Top goalscorer		Manager
Season	Div.	Pos.	Pl.	W	D	L	GS	GA	P	Tajik Cup	Name	League	Manager
2009	1st	10th	18	1	3	14	9	44	6	n/a			
