= Vaysiddin Safarov =

Tajikistani professional football player

Personal information
- Full name: Vaysiddin Saydulloyevich Safarov
- Date of birth: 15 April 1996 (age 30)
- Place of birth: Norak, Tajikistan
- Height: 1.72 m (5 ft 8 in)
- Position: Midfielder

Team information
- Current team: CSKA Pamir Dushanbe

Senior career*
Years	Team	Apps	(Gls)
2014-2015	Khujand		
2016	CSKA Pamir Dushanbe		
2017	Somon Dangara		
2018	Regar-TadAZ Tursunzoda		
2019	Parvoz Bobojon Ghafurov		
2020	Fayzkand	15	(1)
2021-2022	Kuktosh Rudaki	7	(0)
2022-	CSKA Pamir Dushanbe	37	(4)

International career^{‡}
2023–	Tajikistan	2	(0)
- * Club domestic league appearances and goals as of 11:31, 5 January 2024 (UTC) ‡ National team caps and goals as of 11:31, 5 January 2024 (UTC)

Vaysiddin Saydulloyevich Safarov (Russian: Вайсиддин Сайдуллоевич Сафаров; born 15 April 1996) is a Tajikistani professional football player for CSKA Pamir Dushanbe and the Tajikistan national team.

== Career ==
=== International ===
Safarov made his senior team debut on 8 September 2023 against Singapore.

Safarov was named as part of Tajikistans squad for the 2023 AFC Asian Cup.

== Career statistics ==
=== International ===
As of match played 17 October 2023

National team	Year	Apps	Goals
Tajikistan	2023	2	0
Total		2	0

== Honours ==
=== International ===
==== Tajikistan ====
- Merdeka Tournament: 2023
