= 2019 Tajikistan First League =

Tajikistan First League
- Season: 2019
- Champions: Lokomotiv-Pamir
- Promoted: Lokomotiv-Pamir; Fayzkand; Dushanbe-83
- Matches played: 182
- Goals scored: 641 (3.52 per match)
- Top goalscorer: Tohir Malodustov (26)

The Tajikistan First League is the second division of the Tajikistan Football Federation.

== Teams ==
Team	Location	Venue	Capacity
Barkchi	Hisor		
Dushanbe-83	Dushanbe		
Dusti	Dusti		
Eskhata Khujand	Khujand		
Fayzkand	Hulbuk		
Hulbuk Vose	Hulbuk		
Isfara	Isfara		
Khayr Vahdat	Vahdat	Khair Stadium	
Lokomotiv-Pamir	Dushanbe		
Parvoz Bobojon Ghafurov	Ghafurov		
Ravshan Kulob	Kulob		
Saroykamar Panj	Panj		
Shohmansur Dushanbe	Dushanbe		
Zarafshon Pendjikent	Panjakent		

== League table ==
Pos	Team	Pld	W	D	L	GF	GA	GD	Pts	Qualification or relegation
1	Lokomotiv-Pamir	26	19	4	3	80	24	+56	61	Promotion to the 2020 Tajikistan Higher League
2	Fayzkand	26	18	6	2	65	22	+43	60	Promotion to the 2020 Tajikistan Higher League
3	Dushanbe-83	26	16	6	4	48	20	+28	54	Promotion to the 2020 Tajikistan Higher League
4	Parvoz Bobojon Ghafurov	26	15	5	6	52	21	+31	50	
5	Eskhata Khujand	26	15	5	6	62	45	+17	50	
6	Ravshan Kulob	26	15	4	7	55	29	+26	49	
7	Khayr Vahdat	26	14	3	9	44	29	+15	45	
8	Saroykamar Panj	26	10	6	10	38	31	+7	36	
9	Barkchi	26	10	5	11	51	51	0	35	
10	Hulbuk Vose	26	9	5	12	48	51	−3	32	
11	Isfara	26	5	1	20	24	65	−41	16	
12	Dusti	26	4	0	22	34	86	−52	12	
13	Shohmansur Dushanbe	26	2	4	20	28	91	−63	10	
14	Zarafshon Pendjikent	26	2	2	22	12	76	−64	8	

Source: FFT
Rules for classification: 1) Points; 2) Head-to-head points; 3) Head-to-head goal difference; 4) Head-to-head goals scored; 5) Goal difference; 6) Goals scored.

== Season statistics ==
=== Top scorers ===
As of match played 8 December 2019

Rank	Player	Club	Goals
1	(Tajikistan) Tohir Malodustov	Barkchi	26
2	(Tajikistan) Juraboy Isoev	Eskhata Khujand	16
3	(Tajikistan) Mukhsin Maduloev	Fayzkand	14
4	(Tajikistan) Rustam Soirov	Lokomotiv-Pamir	13
4	(Tajikistan) Azizbek Khasanov	Lokomotiv-Pamir	13
4	(Tajikistan) Elchibek Rashidbekov	Dushanbe-83	13
4	(Tajikistan) Daler Cholov	Ravshan Kulob	13
