= Numonjon Hakimov =

Tajikistani footballer (born 1978)

Personal information
- Full name: Nu'mon Xakimov
- Date of birth: 5 September 1978 (age 48)
- Place of birth: Tajik SSR, Soviet Union
- Position: Forward

Senior career*
Years	Team	Apps	(Gls)
2000–2004	Vakhsh Qurghonteppa		
2005–2008	Parvoz		
2009–2011	Vakhsh Qurghonteppa		
2012–2013	Ravshan Kulob		
2014–2015	Daleron-Uroteppa		
2016	Vakhsh Qurghonteppa		

International career
2003–2011	Tajikistan	34	(13)
- * Club domestic league appearances and goals

Nu'mon Xakimov (Tajik: Нӯъмонҷон Ҳакимов; born 5 September 1978) is a Tajikistani former footballer who played as a forward. He was a member of the Tajikistan national team and scored most of their goals (4 out of 7) in the 2010 FIFA World Cup qualification campaign.

== Career statistics ==
Tajikistan
Year	Apps	Goals
2003	7	1
2004	1	0
2005	0	0
2006	6	3
2007	5	4
2008	8	3
2009	0	0
2010	6	2
2011	1	0
Total	34	13

Statistics accurate as of match played 2 September 2011

Scores and results list Tajikistan's goal tally first.

#	Date	Venue	Opponent	Score	Result	Competition
1.	26 November 2003	Sher-e-Bangla Cricket Stadium, Dhaka, Bangladesh	Bangladesh	2–0	2–0	2006 AFC Challenge Cup qualification
2.	9 November 2005	Dushanbe, Tajikistan	Afghanistan	1–0	4–0	Friendly
3.	9 November 2005	Dushanbe, Tajikistan	Afghanistan	2–0	4–0	Friendly
4.	4 April 2006	Bangabandhu National Stadium, Dhaka, Bangladesh	Pakistan	1–0	2–0	2006 AFC Challenge Cup
5.	10 April 2006	Bangabandhu National Stadium, Dhaka, Bangladesh	Bangladesh	4–1	6–1	2006 AFC Challenge Cup
6.	8 October 2007	Bangabandhu National Stadium, Dhaka, Bangladesh	Bangladesh	1–1	1–1	2010 FIFA World Cup qualification
7.	28 October 2007	Central Stadium, Dushanbe, Tajikistan	Bangladesh	1–0	5–0	2010 FIFA World Cup qualification
8.	28 October 2007	Central Stadium, Dushanbe, Tajikistan	Bangladesh	2–0	5–0	2010 FIFA World Cup qualification
9.	28 October 2007	Central Stadium, Dushanbe, Tajikistan	Bangladesh	5–0	5–0	2010 FIFA World Cup qualification
10.	13 May 2008	Barotac Neuvo Plaza Field, Barotac Nuevo, Philippines	Bhutan	1–0	3–1	2008 AFC Challenge Cup qualification
11.	13 May 2008	Barotac Nuevo Plaza Field, Barotac Nuevo, Philippines	Bhutan	3–1	3–1	2008 AFC Challenge Cup qualification
12.	17 May 2008	Iloilo Sports Complex, Iloilo City, Philippines	Brunei	3–0	4–0	2008 AFC Challenge Cup qualification
13.	20 February 2010	CR & FC Grounds, Colombo, Sri Lanka	Myanmar	2–0	3–0	2010 AFC Challenge Cup
14.	27 February 2010	Sugathadasa Stadium, Colombo, Sri Lanka	Myanmar	1–0	1–0	2010 AFC Challenge Cup

Note:
On 16 April 2006, in the 2006 AFC Challenge Cup Final between Tajikistan and Sri Lanka, the match summary indicates that teammate Dzhomikhon Mukhidinov scored a hat-trick. However, in match review article also published by the Asian Football Confederation on 19 April 2006, it indicates that Mukhidinov only scored two goals while Hakimov scored one goal.

== Honours ==
Vakhsh Qurghonteppa

- Tajik League: 2009, 2011
- Tajik Cup: 2003

Parvoz Bobojon Ghafurov

- Tajik Cup: 2007

Ravshan Kulob

- Tajik League: 2012, 2013

Tajikistan

- AFC Challenge Cup: 2006

Individual

- Tajikistan Footballer of the Year: 2009
