= Saroykamar Panj =

- Full name: Saroykamar Panj
- Ground: Central Stadium; Kumsangir, Tajikistan

Saroykamar Panj is a football club from Panj in Tajikistan.

== History ==
=== Domestic history ===
Season	League									Tajik Cup	Top goalscorer		Manager
Season	Div.	Pos.	Pl.	W	D	L	GS	GA	P	Tajik Cup	Name	League	Manager
2005	1st	9th	18	3	2	13	18	55	11				
2006	1st	10th	22	5	2	15	27	50	17				
2007	1st	11th	20	1	3	16	19	71	6				
2008	1st	8th	40	8	5	27	43	91	29				
2014	2nd									Semi-final			
2015	2nd									Quarter-final			
2019	2nd	8th	26	10	6	10	38	31	36				
