= Moritz Fritz =

German footballer

Personal information
- Date of birth: 15 July 1993 (age 33)
- Place of birth: Bielefeld, Germany
- Height: 1.91 m (6 ft 3 in)
- Position: Midfielder

Team information
- Current team: Carl Zeiss Jena
- Number: 23

Youth career
- 1997–2008: VfR Wellensiek
- 2008–2010: VfL Theesen
- 2010–2011: Arminia Bielefeld
- 2011–2012: → Borussia Dortmund (loan)

Senior career*
Years	Team	Apps	(Gls)
2012–2013	Arminia Bielefeld II	28	(5)
2013–2014	SV Lippstadt	33	(7)
2014–2015	Schalke 04 II	24	(2)
2015–2016	Rot-Weiss Essen	29	(5)
2016–2017	Borussia Dortmund II	19	(0)
2017–2019	Fortuna Köln	36	(3)
2019–2025	Viktoria Köln	124	(4)
2025–	Carl Zeiss Jena	41	(3)
- * Club domestic league appearances and goals as of 23 September 2026

Moritz Fritz (born 15 July 1993) is a German professional footballer who plays as a midfielder for Carl Zeiss Jena.
