= 2011 Tajik League =

Tajik League
- Season: 2011
- Champions: Istiqlol
- 2012 AFC President's Cup: Istiqlol
- Matches: 220
- Goals: 740 (3.36 per match)
- Top goalscorer: Yusuf Rabiev (32)
- Biggest home win: Regar-TadAZ 10 - 0 Guardia Dushanbe; 21 November 2011; Istiqlol Dushanbe 10 - 0 Guardia Dushanbe; 9 December 2011
- Biggest away win: Guardia Dushanbe 1 - 10 Regar-TadAZ 17 August 2011
- Highest scoring: Guardia Dushanbe 1 - 10 Regar-TadAZ (11 goals) 17 August 2011

The 2011 Tajik League was the 20th season of Tajik League, the Tajikistan Football Federation's top division of association football. Istiklol retained the Championship they won the previous season.

== Teams ==
Locations of teams in the 2014 Tajik League

Team	Location	Venue	Capacity
CSKA Pamir Dushanbe	Dushanbe	Central Republican Stadium	24,000
Energetik Dushanbe	Dushanbe	Central Republican Stadium	24,000
Guardia Dushanbe	Dushanbe	Stadion Politekhnikum	2,000
Istiklol	Dushanbe	Central Republican Stadium	24,000
Khayr Vahdat	Vahdat	Khair Stadium	8,000
Khujand	Khujand	20-Letie Nezavisimosti Stadium	25,000
Parvoz Bobojon Ghafurov	Ghafurov	Furudgoh Stadium	5,000
Ravshan Kulob	Kulob	Kulob Central Stadium	20,000
Regar-TadAZ	Tursunzoda	Stadium Metallurg 1st District	10,000
Shodmon Ghissar	Hisor		
Vakhsh Qurghonteppa	Qurghonteppa	Tsentralnyi Stadium	10,000

== League standings ==
Pos	Team	Pld	W	D	L	GF	GA	GD	Pts	Qualification or relegation
1	Istiqlol Dushanbe (C)	40	35	3	2	130	16	+114	108	2012 AFC President's Cup
2	Regar-TadAZ	40	30	5	5	108	29	+79	95	
3	Ravshan Kulob	40	29	2	9	78	38	+40	89	
4	Energetik Dushanbe	40	21	3	16	78	64	+14	66	
5	Khayr Vahdat FK	40	17	3	20	61	59	+2	54	
6	SKA-Pamir Dushanbe	40	16	4	20	65	69	−4	52	
7	FK Khujand	40	15	6	19	56	72	−16	51	
8	Vakhsh	40	15	5	20	43	51	−8	50	
9	Parvoz	40	12	4	24	45	76	−31	40	
10	Shodmon Ghissar	40	7	2	31	44	115	−71	23	
11	Guardia Dushanbe	40	3	3	34	32	151	−119	12	

Updated to match(es) played on unknown. Source:
Rules for classification: 1) points; 2) goal difference; 3) number of goals scored.
(C) Champions
