= Tajik Telecom Qurghonteppa =

Tajik Telecom Qughonteppa
- Full name: Tajik Telecom Qughonteppa
- Founded: 1999; 27 years ago
- Ground: Tsentralnyi Stadium; Bokhtar, Tajikistan
- Capacity: 10,000
- League: Tajik League
- 2008: 12th (relegated)
Home colours

Tajik Telecom Qughonteppa founded 1999 is a football club based in Bokhtar, Tajikistan.

== History ==
=== Domestic history ===
Season	League									Tajik Cup	Top goalscorer		Manager
Season	Div.	Pos.	Pl.	W	D	L	GS	GA	P	Tajik Cup	Name	League	Manager
2006	1st	6th	22	11	2	9	41	38	35		(Tajikistan) Fozil Sattorov	20	
2007	1st	9th	20	11	4	5	44	23	37				
2008	1st	7th	40	18	2	20	67	68	56				
