= Artyom Petrenko =

Russian footballer (born 1986)

Personal information
- Full name: Artyom Aleksandrovich Petrenko
- Date of birth: 18 February 1986 (age 40)
- Place of birth: Rostov-on-Don, Russian SFSR
- Height: 1.76 m (5 ft 9 1/2 in)
- Position: Midfielder

Senior career*
Years	Team	Apps	(Gls)
2001–2003	FC Lada Togliatti	13	(0)
2004	FC Chernomorets Novorossiysk	0	(0)
2005–2007	FC Nistru Otaci	7	(1)
2007	FC Metallurg Lipetsk	8	(1)
2008–2009	FC Neftekhimik Nizhnekamsk	46	(6)
2009	FC Tyumen	5	(1)
2010	FC Dynamo Stavropol	11	(0)
2011	FC Dynamo Kirov	10	(1)
2011–2012	FC Amur-2010 Blagoveshchensk	14	(0)
2012–2013	FC SKA Rostov-on-Don	12	(0)
2013	Istiklol Dushanbe	2	(0)
2013–2014	FC Donenergo Aksay		
2014	FC SKChF Sevastopol	5	(1)
2015	FC Taganrog	0	(0)
2016	FC DSI Komsomolsk-na-Amure		
2017	FC Belogorsk		
- * Club domestic league appearances and goals

Artyom Aleksandrovich Petrenko (Russian: Артём Александрович Петренко; born 18 February 1986) is a former Russian professional football player.

== Club career ==
He played in the Russian Football National League for FC Lada Togliatti in 2003.
