= Langari Langarieva Stadium =

Stadium in the city of Kulob, Tajikistan

Coordinates: 37°54′57.3″N 69°48′03.4″E

Kulob Arena
- Interactive map of Kulob Arena
- Former names: Pakhtakor Stadium Langari Langarieva Stadium Varzishgohi Markaziy
- Address: Kulob; Tajikistan
- Location: Kulob, Tajikistan
- Capacity: 20,000
- Surface: Grass

Construction
- Opened: 1966

Tenant
- Ravshan Kulob

Langari Langarieva Stadium, Kulob Arena or Kulob Markazii Stadium, is a stadium in Kulob, Tajikistan. It has a capacity of 20,000 spectators. It is the home of Ravshan Kulob of the Tajik League.

The stadium was built in 1966 by order of the Central Committee of the Communist Party of the Tajik SSR to host home matches of the team created a year earlier. When the stadium was built, it was called Pakhtakor Stadium, later the stadium was renamed. The stadium seats 20 thousand spectators, and in addition to football matches, the stadium also hosts competitions in other sports. The stadium also hosts the main holidays of the city and country.

== Notable matches and events ==
- 1st of November 2023 - 2023 Tajikistan Cup Final between Istiklol and Ravshan. Istiklol won the match in penalty shootout (1:1, 4:2 by penalty)
