= Zarafshon Pendjikent =

Zarafshon Panjakent
- Full name: Zarafshon Panjakent
- Ground: Stadion Zarafshon; Panjakent, Tajikistan
- League: Tajik League
- 2012: 13th (relegated)

Zarafshon Panjakent is football club based in Panjakent. They played one season in the Tajik League, the top division of the country, as newly promoted team in 2012, but finished bottom and were relegated.

== League and domestic cup history ==
Season	League									Tajik Cup	Top goalscorer		Manager
Season	Div.	Pos.	Pl.	W	D	L	GS	GA	P	Tajik Cup	Name	League	Manager
2012	1st	13th	24	1	3	20	21	98	6	Quarter-final			
2019	2nd	14th	26	2	2	22	12	76	8				
