= FK Daleron-Uroteppa =

Daleron-Uroteppa
- Full name: Football Club Daleron-Uroteppa
- Founded: 2011; 15 years ago
- Dissolved: March 25, 2016; 10 years ago
- Ground: Istravshan Arena; Istravshan, Tajikistan
- Chairman: Alisher Fozilov
- Manager: Ali Akbar Ostad Asadi
- League: Tajik League
- 2015: 9th
- Website: http://uroteppa.blogspot.ru/

Football Club Daleron-Uroteppa (Tajik: Дастаи Футболи Далерон, Dastai Futboli Daleron) is a former professional football club based in Istaravshan, Tajikistan.

== History ==
The club was founded before the 2011 season and was formed of the players who left FK Istaravshan. In their first season, "Daleron" was declared in the Sughd Region of the First League, where they finished sixth. In 2012 they once again played in the Sughd Region of the First Division, winning the league.

In 2013, "Daleron" finished second in the First League Zonal tournament. At the same time FK Istaravshan ceased to exist due to financial problems, and "Daleron" were awarded their place in the Tajik League. During the off season In the off-season 2013/14 a possible merger between "Daleron" and "FK Istaravshan" was discussed, but eventually did not happen.

During the club's first season in the Tajik League they finished 3rd. Prior to the 2016 season, the club, without the backing of a sponsor, suffered financial problems resulting in their foreign players leaving the club. On 25 March 2016, the Tajikistan Football Federation announced that FK Daleron-Uroteppa had withdrawn from the league due to financial problems.

=== Names ===
- 2011–2012: "Daleron"
- 2013: "Uroteppa"
- 2013–present: "Daleron-Uroteppa"

=== Domestic history ===
Season	League									Tajik Cup	Top goalscorer		Manager
Season	Div.	Pos.	Pl.	W	D	L	GS	GA	P	Tajik Cup	Name	League	Manager
2014	1st	3	18	9	6	3	20	11	33				Turdiev Ahliddin; Nurulloev Asatullo; Makhmadjon Khabibulloev
2015	1st	9	18	3	3	12	16	36	12	Last 16	(Tajikistan) Abdusamad Khodzhibaev	4	Maruf Rustamov; Aliyor Ashurmamadov

== Coaches ==
- Nurulloev Asatullo (~2012–2013)
- Turdiev Ahliddin (February–June 2014)
- Nurulloev Asatullo (s. O., June–July 2014)
- Makhmadjon Khabibulloev (August 2014 – January 2015)
- Maruf Rustamov (February 2015 – July 2015)
- Aliyor Ashurmamadov (30 July 2015–March 2016)
