= Gvardia Dushanbe =

Guardia Dushanbe
- Full name: FK Guardia Dushanbe
- Ground: Stadion Politekhnikum; Dushanbe, Tajikistan
- Capacity: 2,000
- League: Tajik League
- 2012: 12th

Guardia Dushanbe is a football club based in Dushanbe, the capital of Tajikistan.

== History ==
=== Domestic history ===
Season	League									Tajik Cup	Top goalscorer		Manager
Season	Div.	Pos.	Pl.	W	D	L	GS	GA	P	Tajik Cup	Name	League	Manager
2007	1st	9th	20	1	3	16	13	52	6				
2008	1st	5th	40	7	7	26	34	82	28				
2009	1st	9th	18	2	2	14	10	55	8				
2011	1st	11th	40	3	3	34	32	151	12				
2012	1st	12th	24	4	0	20	18	72	12	Semi-final			(Tajikistan) Sergey Kapusta
