= Barkchi Hisor =

Association football club in Tajikistan

Barkchi Hisor Барқчӣ Ҳисор
- Full name: Dastai Futboli Barkchi Hisor
- Founded: 2006; 20 years ago
- Ground: Ibrogimbek Gaforov Stadium
- Capacity: 3.000
- Chairman: Nozim Mahmadboev
- Manager: Rustam Zafarzoda
- League: Ligai Olii Tojikiston
- 2025: 8th
- Website: barqchi-fc.tj
Home colours	Away colours

Barkchi Hisor (Tajik: Барқчӣ Ҳисор) is a professional football club based in Hisor, Tajikistan, formerly known as Barqi Tojik Hisor (Tajik: Дастаи Футболи Барқи Тоҷик). They currently play in the top division of the country, and formerly played in the Soviet Second League.

== History ==
Prior to the 2015 Tajik Season, Energetik Dushanbe were renamed Barqi Tojik Hisor.

On 9 June 2017, Barkchi appointed Mubin Ergashev as their manager after Vitaliy Levchenko joined the coaching staff of Krylia Sovetov.

=== Names ===
Year	Name
2006–2014	Energetik Dushanbe
2015	Barqi Tojik Hisor
2016–present	Barkchi Hisor

=== Domestic history ===
Season	League									Tajik Cup	Top goalscorer		Manager
Season	Div.	Pos.	Pl.	W	D	L	GS	GA	P	Tajik Cup	Name	League	Manager
2007	1st	9th	20	5	3	12	24	40	18				(Tajikistan) Tokhirjon Muminov
2008	1st	5th	40	20	5	15	73	49	65	Runner-up			(Tajikistan) Tokhirjon Muminov
2009	1st	5th	18	10	2	6	41	18	32		(Tajikistan) Sukhrob Khamidov	13	(Tajikistan) Khakim Fuzailov (Tajikistan) Karimov Ibodullo
2010	1st	5th	32	12	4	16	41	44	40	Quarter-final			(Tajikistan) Karimov Ibodullo
2011	1st	4th	40	21	3	16	78	64	66				(Tajikistan) Ahliddin Turdiev (Tajikistan) Bakhtiyor Halimov
2012	1st	10th	24	7	6	11	35	34	27	Semi-final	(Tajikistan) Shodibek Gafforov	12	(Tajikistan) Najmiddin Tolibov
2013	1st	8th	18	4	4	10	13	23	16				(Tajikistan) Tokhirjon Muminov (Tajikistan) Hamid Karimov
2014	1st	7th	18	5	4	9	17	30	19				(Tajikistan) Alisher Tukhtaev
2015	1st	7th	18	4	2	12	17	32	14	Quarter-final	(Tajikistan) Firuz Rachmatoff	4	(Tajikistan) Alisher Tukhtaev
2016	1st	4th	18	9	2	7	32	25	29	Quarter-final	(Tajikistan) Nuriddin Khamrokul	7	(Tajikistan) Rustam Khodjaev
2017	1st	5th	21	6	6	9	20	27	24	Semi-final			(Tajikistan) Vitaliy Levchenko (Tajikistan) Mubin Ergashev
2018	1st	8th	21	4	1	16	16	34	13	Quarter-final			(Tajikistan) Mubin Ergashev
2019	2nd	9th	26	10	5	11	51	51	35		(Tajikistan) Tohir Malodustov	26	
2023	2nd	3rd	22	14	5	3	66	23	47				

== Current squad ==
As of 9 March 2026

Note: Flags indicate national team as defined under FIFA eligibility rules; some limited exceptions apply. Players may hold more than one non-FIFA nationality.

No.	Pos.	Nation	Player
1	GK	TJK	Muhammadrabi Rakhmatulloev
2	DF	TJK	Fakhriddin Akhtamov
4	DF	TJK	Mehrubon Gafforzoda
6	DF	GHA	Mohammed Kamal
8	MF	TJK	Dzhovidon Khushvakhtov
9	FW	TJK	Mekhron Madaminov
10	MF	TJK	Azizbek Daliev
11	FW	GHA	Fredrick Asante
13	MF	CMR	Étienne Landry Onana
14	DF	TJK	Muso Kakhorov
17	MF	TJK	Masrur Kiyomiddinov

No.	Pos.	Nation	Player
18	MF	TJK	Bakhodur Nazarzoda
19	DF	TJK	Shokhimardon Khasanov
21	DF	TJK	Rustam Kamolov
27	GK	GHA	Quaye Godson
30	DF	TJK	Kamariddin Gafforzoda
44	DF	TJK	Dilovar Jamshedzoda
47	MF	TJK	Zarif Zarifzoda
55	DF	TJK	Shahriyori Inoyatullo
63	FW	TJK	Muhammadjon Mirakhmadov
70	MF	TJK	Shahrom Sulaymonov
77	MF	TJK	Abdullo Sharopov
88	FW	TJK	Bilol Boboev

== Managers ==
- (Tajikistan) Oraz Nazarov
- (Iran) Hadi Bargizar (2011–??)
- (Tajikistan) Mubin Ergashev (2017–2018)

== See also ==
- Bargh Shiraz FC
