= Parvoz Bobojon Ghafurov =

Football club based in Tajikistan

Parvoz-Aeroport Khujand
- Full name: Football Club Parvoz-Aeroport Khujand
- Founded: 2001; 25 years ago
- Ground: Furudgoh Stadium; Buston, Sughd, Tajikistan
- Capacity: 5,000
- Chairman: M. Mahmudov
- Manager: Muhammad Djuraev
- League: Tajikistan First League
- 2024: Tajik League, 2nd

Parvoz-Aeroport Khujand (Клуби футболи Парвоз-Аэропорт Хуҷанд) is a professional football club based in Khujand, Tajikistan. The currently play in the Tajikistan First League.

== History ==
Parvoz Bobojon Ghafurov was founded in 2001 as "Aviator Chkalovsk", and was based in the northern Tajik town of Chkalovsk. In 2003 Aviator Chkalovsk participated in the top flight of the Tajik Football, the Tajik League, for the first time, finishing third behind Champions Regar-TadAZ and FK Khujand. The following season Aviator repeated their third place in the league whilst also winning the Tajik Cup for the first time, defeating FK Istaravshan 5–0 in the final. Prior to the 2005 season, Aviator moved to Ghafurov, were renamed "Parvoz Bobojon Ghafurov" and finished third for the third season in a row. Parvoz's highest league finish came in 2007, when they finished as runners-up to Regar-TadAZ and won the Tajik Cup for the second time, this time defeating Hima Dushanbe 1–0 in the final. 2008 saw Parvoz again finish second behind Regar-TadAZ. From 2017 it is renamed to Football Club Parvoz-Khujand Airport.

== Name history ==
- 2001–2004: Aviator Chkalovsk
- 2004: Aviator Bobojon Ghafurov
- 2005–2017: Parvoz Bobojon Ghafurov
- 2017–: Parvoz-Aeroport Khujand

== Domestic history ==
Season	League									Tajik Cup	Top goalscorer		Manager
Season	Div.	Pos.	Pl.	W	D	L	GS	GA	P	Tajik Cup	Name	League	Manager
2003	1st	3	30	23	2	5	71	25	71				(Tajikistan) Sharif Nazarov
2004	1st	3	36	22	5	9	87	33	71	Winner			(Tajikistan) Sharif Nazarov
2005	1st	3	18	10	4	4	38	20	34				(Tajikistan) Sharif Nazarov
2006	1st	4	22	15	2	5	39	25	47		(Tajikistan) Numonjon Hakimov	19	
2007	1st	2	20	17	0	3	52	10	51	Winner	(Tajikistan) Numonjon Hakimov	30	(Tajikistan) Tohir Nurmatov
2008	1st	2	40	28	6	6	89	29	90				(Tajikistan) Tohir Nurmatov
2009	1st	6	18	7	4	7	27	22	25	Quarter-final			(Tajikistan) Tohir Nurmatov (Tajikistan) Hamid Karimov
2010	1st	8	32	6	6	20	35	71	24				(Tajikistan) Hamid Karimov
2011	1st	9	40	12	4	24	45	76	40				(Tajikistan) Muhammad Juraev
2012	1st	5	24	10	4	10	47	36	34	Round of 16			(Tajikistan) Muhammad Juraev
2013	1st	6	18	4	7	7	14	29	19	Semi-final			(Tajikistan) Muhammad Juraev
2014	1st	5	18	8	1	9	28	35	25		(Tajikistan) Farkhod Tokhirov	6	(Tajikistan) Muhammad Juraev
2015	1st	10	18	1	1	16	6	44	4	Last 16	(Tajikistan) Maruf Marifboev	2	
2016	1st	10	18	1	2	15	14	50	5		(Tajikistan) Ghafoor Madaminov	4	
2019	2nd	4th	26	15	5	6	52	21	50				

== Honours ==
- Tajik Cup
  - Winners (2): 2004, 2007

== Current squad ==
As of 9 March 2026

Note: Flags indicate national team as defined under FIFA eligibility rules; some limited exceptions apply. Players may hold more than one non-FIFA nationality.

No.	Pos.	Nation	Player
1	GK	TJK	Dalerjon Barotov
2	DF	TJK	Aleksandr Mukhin
4	DF	TJK	Dilovar Sharifzoda
5	DF	UZB	Ismoiljon Okhunjonov
7	MF	TJK	Emomali Akhmadkhon
8	MF	TJK	Munir Davlatbekov
9	FW	UZB	Bakhodir Abduvaliev
10	MF	TJK	Ramazon Bakhtaliev
11	MF	UKR	Evgeniy Bidenko
13	DF	TJK	Umed Odinaev
14	FW	TJK	Tokhir Malodustov
17	FW	TJK	Mukhsin Rustamzoda
19	MF	TJK	Shakhriyor Polvonov

No.	Pos.	Nation	Player
20	MF	TJK	Daler Makhatov
22	MF	TJK	Sharaf Azizov
23	MF	GHA	Duah Daniel Kuiko
27	FW	TJK	Makhmudjon Muminov
35	GK	TJK	Mukhriddin Akhmedov
42	DF	TJK	Amirbek Jumaev
63	MF	TJK	Tabriz Mirzoaliev
73	MF	UKR	Kirilo Voloshin
74	FW	TJK	Asadbek Jurabekzoda
77	DF	UZB	Bekjon Juraboev
81	DF	TJK	Parviz Izatshoev
97	GK	TJK	Akhliddin Khabibulloev
