= Ravshan Kulob =

Association football club in Tajikistan

Ravshan Kulob Равшан Кӯлоб
- Full name: Ravshan Kulob; Равшан Кӯлоб
- Founded: 1965; 61 years ago
- Ground: Kulob Markazii Stadium
- Capacity: 20,000
- Chairman: Zaynulla Sohibov
- Manager: Dmitri Cheryshev
- League: Ligai Olii Tojikiston
- 2025: THL, 4th
Home colours	Away colours

Ravshan Kulob (Tajik: Равшан Кӯлоб) is a professional football club based in Kulob, Tajikistan, formed in 1965 as FK Ansol Kulob. The club was renamed FK Olimp-Ansol Kulob in 2003, before changing to its current name in 2005. They currently play in the Ligai Olii Tojikiston and host their matches at Kulob Markazii Stadium. The club's name Равшан is translated from Tajik and Persian as Light.

== History ==
Ravshan Kulob were founded as Ansol Kulob in 1965 in the Tajik Soviet Socialist Republic. By the 1980s, they were playing in the fourth tier of the Soviet Union football league system. Following the dissolution of the Soviet Union, Kulob played in the first independent 1992 Tajik League but withdrew due to political reasons during the Tajikistani Civil War but returned the next year.

In the early 2010s, there were a number of controversies surrounding Ravshan. In 2011, Ravshan were sanctioned after their fans engaged in football hooliganism after a match against Istiqlol Dushanbe. 40 Ravshan fans were arrested, with the Tajikistan Football Federation (TFF) fining the club $550 and forcing them to play their next five home games 100km away from Kulob. In 2012, five of their players were sanctioned for "unruly" behaviour by the TFF during a match against Istiqlol. This led to controversy due to Istiqilol being founded by the son of the President of Tajikistan, who had just been made President of the TFF, with Ravshan fans accusing the referee of bias against them. Despite these, Ravshan won the Tajik League in 2012 and 2013.

=== Domestic history ===
Season	League									Tajik Cup	Top goalscorer	
Season	Div.	Pos.	Pl.	W	D	L	GS	GA	P	Tajik Cup	Name	League
1992	1st	12	10	0	1	9	4	20	1			
1993	1st	11	30	12	5	13	50	41	29	Winners		
1994	1st	12	30	9	3	18	41	71	21	Runners-up		
1995	1st	7	28	13	2	13	55	52	41			
1996	1st	4	30	20	3	7	87	36	63		Muhitdin Izzatulloev	35
1997	1st	6	24	13	1	10	47	32	40			
1999	1st	3	22	15	1	6	62	36	46		I.Isakov	18
2003	1st	6	30	17	3	10	69	46	54			
2004	1st	9	36	10	6	20	55	70	36			
2005	1st	8	18	4	5	9	21	29	17			
2008	1st	10	40	7	6	27	43	103	27			
2009	1st	7	18	5	2	11	25	45	17	First round	(Tajikistan) Sherali Azizov	8
2010	1st	9	32	1	3	28	18	95	6			
2011	1st	3	40	29	2	9	78	38	89			
2012	1st	1	24	20	2	2	51	10	62	Round of 16	(Tajikistan) Numonjon Hakimov	12
2013	1st	1	18	14	4	0	26	5	46		(Tajikistan) Hasan Rustamov	7
2014	1st	10	18	2	3	13	18	44	9		(Tajikistan) Nowruz Rustamov	6
2015	1st	3	18	10	4	4	37	26	34	Semi-final	(Iran) Hossein Sohrabi	18
2016	1st	9	18	2	3	13	17	50	9	Semi-final		
2019	2nd	6	26	15	4	7	55	29	26		(Tajikistan) Daler Cholov	13
2020	2nd	1	22	17	0	5	72	38	51	Winners	(Tajikistan) Amirdzhoni Farruhzod	6
2021	1st	7	27	7	8	12	27	35	29	Semi-final	(Ghana) Effah Kingsley	5
2022	1st	2	22	9	8	5	25	22	35	Quarterfinal	(Tajikistan) Abdukhalil Boronov	8
2023	1st	2	22	9	8	5	29	20	35	Runner-Up		
2024	1st	3	22	11	8	3	33	17	41	Semifinal		
2025	1st	4	22	8	11	3	26	20	35	Semifinal	(Nigeria) Olaoluwa Ojetunde	7

=== Continental history ===
As of match played 4 December 2024

Competition	Pld	W	D	L	GF	GA
AFC Cup	21	1	3	17	12	55
AFC Champions League Two	4	1	0	3	3	11
Total	25	2	3	20	15	66

Season	Competition	Round	Club	Home	Away	Aggregate
2013	AFC Cup	Group D	(Jordan) Al-Ramtha	0–1	0–5	4th
2013	AFC Cup	Group D	(Kuwait) Qadsia	1–3	0–3	4th
2013	AFC Cup	Group D	(Syria) Al-Shorta	1–3	0–2	4th
2014	AFC Cup	Play-off	(Yemen) Al-Yarmuk Al-Rawda	2–1		
2014	AFC Cup	Group A	(Jordan) That Ras	2–3	1–5	4th
2014	AFC Cup	Group A	(Lebanon) Safa	1–2	0–8	4th
2014	AFC Cup	Group A	(Oman) Al-Suwaiq	0–5	1–3	4th
2021	AFC Cup	Group E	(Kyrgyzstan) Dordoi Bishkek	0–3	—N/a	3rd
2021	AFC Cup	Group E	(Turkmenistan) Ahal	—N/a	1–3	3rd
2023–24	AFC Cup	Group E	(Kyrgyzstan) Abdysh-Ata Kant	0–1	0–1	4th
2023–24	AFC Cup	Group E	(Turkmenistan) Altyn Asyr	0–1	1–1	4th
2023–24	AFC Cup	Group E	(Turkmenistan) Merw Mary	0–0	1–1	4th
2024–25	AFC Champions League Two	Group A	(India) Mohun Bagan	—N/a	—N/a	3rd
2024–25	AFC Champions League Two	Group A	(Iran) Tractor	1–3	0–7	3rd
2024–25	AFC Champions League Two	Group A	(Qatar) Al-Wakrah	0–1	2–0	3rd

== Current squad ==
As of 9 March 2026

Note: Flags indicate national team as defined under FIFA eligibility rules; some limited exceptions apply. Players may hold more than one non-FIFA nationality.

No.	Pos.	Nation	Player
1	GK	TJK	Khusniddin Makhmadali
2	DF	TJK	Saidisroil Saidov
4	DF	TJK	Alisher Kholmurodov
5	DF	BLR	Aleksey Firsov
7	FW	TJK	Khusrav Toirov
8	MF	SRB	Miloš Milovanović
9	FW	NGR	Henry Okpala
10	MF	TJK	Murodali Aknazarov
11	FW	TJK	Oriyonmekhr Kholikzoda
14	DF	TJK	Bakhtovari Khursed
17	MF	TJK	Jamshed Murodov
18	MF	TJK	Ruslan Khayloyev

No.	Pos.	Nation	Player
19	DF	TJK	Mikdod Rozikov
20	MF	TJK	Mekhrubon Khamidov
25	GK	UKR	Andrii Chekotun
27	MF	UKR	Oleh Vlasov
30	MF	TJK	Fatkhullo Olimzoda
44	DF	TJK	Mekhrubon Karimov
55	GK	TJK	Saidzhon Sharifzoda
63	MF	RUS	Saidkhodzha Mukhammad Sharifi
70	MF	TJK	Kabir Salimshoev
77	MF	TJK	Alisher Rakhimov
88	DF	TJK	Sayedi Kovussho
94	DF	NGR	Chukwuebuka Okoronkwo

== Honours ==
- Tajik League
  - Champions (2): 2012, 2013
- Tajik Cup
  - Winners (2): 1994, 2020
- Tajik Supercup
  - Winners (2): 2013, 2023
