= 2025 FC Istiklol season =

FC Istiklol
2025 season
- President: Shohruh Saidov
- Manager: Igor Cherevchenko
- Stadium: Republican Stadium
- Higher League: 1st (champions)
- Tajikistan Cup: Quarter-final vs Vakhsh Bokhtar
- Super Cup: Winners
- AFC Champions League Two: Group stage
- Top goalscorer: League: Rustam Soirov (10); All: Rustam Soirov (11)
Home colours	Away colours

The FC Istiklol 2025 season was Istiklol's seventeenth Tajik League season, of which they were defending Tajik League Champions, and also participated in the Tajik Cup, Tajik Supercup and AFC Champions League Two.

== Season events ==
On 14 January, Istiklol announced that their contracts with Darko Ilieski, Dimitar Mitkov and Francesco Margiotta had all ended and the players had left the club.

On 16 January, Istiklol announced that Shervoni Mabatshoev had left the club to sign a 18-month contract with Kapaz.

On 22 January, Istiklol announced the signing of Masrur Gafurov from Barkchi Hisor to a three-year contract.

On 23 January, Istiklol announced the signing of Joseph Okoro from Dinamo Minsk to a one-year contract.

On 24 January, Istiklol announced the signing of Mukhammadzhon Rakhimov from Ravshan Kulob.

On 28 January, Istiklol announced the return of Dženis Beganović, on a one-year contract.

On 14 February, Istiklol announced the signing of Reza Dehghani, who'd last played for Mes Rafsanjan, to a one-year contract.

On 16 February, Istiklol announced the signing of Lawrence Nicholas, who'd last played for Fatih Karagümrük, to a one-year contract.

On 17 February, Istiklol announced that Khaydar Sattorov had joined Hulbuk and that Mekhron Madaminov had joined Barkchi Hisor, both on loan for the season.

On 19 February, Istiklol announced that Romish Jalilov and Shahrom Sulaymonov had both re-signed for the club after spending the previous season at Khosilot Farkhor.

On 20 February, Istiklol announced that Olimjon Juraev and Shukhratdzhon Shonazarov had joined Sardor on loan for the season. Later on the same day, Istiklol announced that they had extended their contracts with Mukhriddin Khasanov, Tabrezi Davlatmir, Alisher Dzhalilov and Manuchekhr Dzhalilov.

On 24 February, Istiklol announced the signing of Joshua Akpudje, who'd last played for Ilves, to a one-year contract.

On 26 February, Istiklol announced the signing of Muzaffar Safaralii from CSKA Pamir Dushanbe to a three-year contract.

On 10 July, Istiklol announced the return of Manuchekhr Safarov from Dinamo Samarqand.

On 16 July, Istiklol announced the departure of Ruslan Khayloyev, Lawrence Nicholas and Abubakar Umar by mutual consent.

On 19 July, Istiklol announced the departure of Joshua Akpudje by mutual consent.

On 21 July, Istiklol announced the signing of Kirill Suslov from Sochi, to a one-year contract.

On 28 July, Istiklol announced the signing of Siavash Hagh Nazari from Nassaji Mazandaran and the return of Ehson Panjshanbe from Sogdiana, both on contracts until the end of the season. The following day, 29 July, Istiklol announced the signing of Rudolf Turkaj from Suhareka also on a contract until the end of the season.

On 30 July, Istiklol announced the signing of Paul Komolafe from Khujand.

On 31 July, Istiklol announced the signing of Marlen Chobanov from Shurtan.

On 29 December, Istiklol announced that the contracts of Igor Cherevchenko and his coaching staff had expired and that they had left the club.

== Squad ==
As of match played 24 December 2025

No.	Name	Nationality	Position	Date of birth (age)	Signed from	Signed in	Contract ends	Apps.	Goals
Goalkeepers
1	Nikola Stošić	(Serbia)	GK	15 March 1994 (aged 31)	Prva Iskra Barič	2024	2026	172	0
22	Muzaffar Safaralii	(Tajikistan)	GK	26 September 2004 (aged 21)	CSKA Pamir Dushanbe	2025	2027	0	0
99	Mukhriddin Khasanov	(Tajikistan)	GK	23 September 2002 (aged 23)	Khujand	2021	2025	54	0
Defenders
3	Tabrez Islomov	(Tajikistan)	DF	6 June 1998 (aged 27)	Narva Trans	2022	2025	181	3
4	Marlen Chobanov	(Uzbekistan)	DF	10 October 2000 (aged 25)	Shurtan	2025		16	1
5	Sodikjon Kurbonov	(Tajikistan)	DF	19 January 2003 (aged 22)	Dynamo Dushanbe	2023		71	4
15	Kirill Suslov	(Russia)	DF	26 October 1991 (aged 34)	Sochi	2025	2026	11	0
19	Akhtam Nazarov	(Tajikistan)	DF	29 September 1992 (aged 33)	Andijon	2023		312	24
21	Romish Jalilov	(Tajikistan)	DF	21 November 1995 (aged 30)	Khosilot Farkhor	2025			
55	Manuchekhr Safarov	(Tajikistan)	DF	31 May 2001 (aged 24)	Neftchi Fergana	2025		46	7
66	Rustam Kamolov	(Tajikistan)	DF	4 June 2007 (aged 18)	Youth Team	2022		18	1
95	Rudolf Turkaj	(Albania)	DF	3 February 1995 (aged 30)	Suhareka	2025	2025	9	1
Midfielders
6	Amirbek Juraboev	(Tajikistan)	MF	13 April 1996 (aged 29)	Kedah Darul Aman	2024	2025	188	18
8	Siavash Hagh Nazari	(Iran)	MF	3 August 1995 (aged 30)	Nassaji Mazandaran	2025	2025	15	3
10	Alisher Dzhalilov	(Tajikistan)	MF	29 August 1993 (aged 32)	AGMK	2023	2025	169	70
11	Mukhammadzhon Rakhimov	(Tajikistan)	MF	15 October 1998 (aged 27)	Ravshan Kulob	2025		164	26
12	Mehrubon Odilzoda	(Tajikistan)	MF	15 September 2009 (aged 16)	Academy	2025		4	0
14	Mukhammad Mukhammadzoda	(Tajikistan)	MF	14 April 2005 (aged 20)	Academy	2025		0	0
17	Ehson Panjshanbe	(Tajikistan)	MF	12 May 1999 (aged 26)	Sogdiana	2025	2025	178	40
33	Joseph Okoro	(Nigeria)	MF	17 February 2001 (aged 24)	Dinamo Minsk	2025	2025	45	0
70	Shahrom Sulaymonov	(Tajikistan)	MF	27 June 1997 (aged 28)	Khosilot Farkhor	2025		132	7
77	Reza Dehghani	(Iran)	MF	7 January 1998 (aged 27)	Unattached	2025	2025	25	5
Forwards
9	Rustam Soirov	(Tajikistan)	FW	12 September 2002 (aged 23)	Lokomotiv Tashkent	2024	2025	120	47
13	Mukhammad Nazriev	(Tajikistan)	FW	23 October 2008 (aged 17)	Academy	2025		6	0
28	Masrur Gafurov	(Tajikistan)	FW	21 January 2006 (aged 19)	Barkchi Hisor	2025	2027	20	2
43	Paul Komolafe	(Nigeria)	FW	12 June 2000 (aged 25)	Khujand	2025		17	8
63	Manuchekhr Dzhalilov	(Tajikistan)	FW	27 September 1990 (aged 35)	Persebaya Surabaya	2020	2025	232	188
Youth Team
	Mustafo Khasanbekov	(Tajikistan)	DF	29 January 2009 (aged 16)	Academy	2024		1	0
	Husein Qurbanov	(Tajikistan)	DF		Academy	2024		1	0
	Akhmadzhon Shoev	(Tajikistan)	DF	1 August 2008 (aged 17)	Academy	2024		1	0
	Ramazon Bakhtaliev	(Tajikistan)	MF	24 October 2008 (aged 17)	Academy	2024		1	0
	Parviz Bobonazarov	(Tajikistan)	MF	4 January 2009 (aged 16)	Academy	2024		1	0
	Muboriz Miskinshoev	(Tajikistan)	MF	23 February 2008 (aged 17)	Academy	2024		0	0
	Muhammad Rajabov	(Tajikistan)	MF		Academy	2024		1	0
	Mukhammadzhon Tokhiri	(Tajikistan)	FW	15 September 2006 (aged 19)	Barkchi	2024		0	0
Away on loan
	Olimjon Juraev	(Tajikistan)	GK	17 September 2003 (aged 22)	Youth team	2022		0	0
	Khaydar Sattorov	(Tajikistan)	DF	18 February 2003 (aged 22)	Youth Team	2023		5	0
	Shukhratdzhon Shonazarov	(Tajikistan)	MF	26 October 2002 (aged 23)	Youth Team	2022		8	0
	Mekhron Madaminov	(Tajikistan)	FW	1 May 2002 (aged 23)	Torpedo Miass	2024	2025	14	2
Left during the season
8	Dženis Beganović	(Bosnia and Herzegovina)	MF	23 March 1996 (aged 29)	Unattached	2025		31	3
18	Ruslan Khayloyev	(Tajikistan)	MF	29 October 2003 (aged 22)	Unattached	2024	2025	14	0
24	Lawrence Nicholas	(Nigeria)	MF	17 May 2001 (aged 24)	Unattached	2025	2025	11	1
25	Abubakar Umar	(Nigeria)	MF	1 March 2005 (aged 20)	Saksan	2025		0	0
44	Joshua Akpudje	(Nigeria)	DF	23 July 1998 (aged 27)	Unattached	2025		13	2

== Transfers ==
=== In ===
Date	Position	Nationality	Name	From	Fee	Ref.
22 January 2025	FW	(Tajikistan)	Masrur Gafurov	Barkchi Hisor	Undisclosed	
23 January 2025	MF	(Nigeria)	Joseph Okoro	Dinamo Minsk	Undisclosed	
24 January 2025	MF	(Tajikistan)	Mukhammadzhon Rakhimov	Ravshan Kulob	Undisclosed	
28 January 2025	MF	(Bosnia and Herzegovina)	Dženis Beganović	Unattached	Free	
14 February 2025	MF	(Iran)	Reza Dehghani	Unattached	Free	
16 February 2025	MF	(Nigeria)	Lawrence Nicholas	Unattached	Free	
19 February 2025	MF	(Tajikistan)	Romish Jalilov	Khosilot Farkhor	Undisclosed	
19 February 2025	MF	(Tajikistan)	Shahrom Sulaymonov	Khosilot Farkhor	Undisclosed	
24 February 2025	DF	(Nigeria)	Joshua Akpudje	Unattached	Free	
26 February 2025	GK	(Tajikistan)	Muzaffar Safaralii	CSKA Pamir Dushanbe	Undisclosed	
6 March 2025	MF	(Nigeria)	Abubakar Umar	Saksan	Undisclosed	
10 July 2025	DF	(Tajikistan)	Manuchekhr Safarov	Neftchi Fergana	Undisclosed	
21 July 2025	DF	(Russia)	Kirill Suslov	Sochi	Undisclosed	
28 July 2025	MF	(Iran)	Siavash Hagh Nazari	Nassaji Mazandaran	Undisclosed	
28 July 2025	MF	(Tajikistan)	Ehson Panjshanbe	Sogdiana	Undisclosed	
29 July 2025	DF	(Albania)	Rudolf Turkaj	Suhareka	Undisclosed	
30 July 2025	FW	(Nigeria)	Paul Komolafe	Khujand	Undisclosed	
31 July 2025	DF	(Uzbekistan)	Marlen Chobanov	Shurtan	Undisclosed	

=== Out ===
Date	Position	Nationality	Name	To	Fee	Ref.
13 January 2025	MF	(Tajikistan)	Amadoni Kamolov	Gol Gohar Sirjan	Undisclosed	
16 January 2025	MF	(Tajikistan)	Shervoni Mabatshoev	Kapaz	Undisclosed	

=== Loans out ===
Date	Position	Nationality	Name	To	Fee	Ref.
17 February 2025	DF	(Tajikistan)	Khaydar Sattorov	Hulbuk	End of season	
17 February 2025	FW	(Tajikistan)	Mekhron Madaminov	Barkchi Hisor	End of season	
20 February 2025	GK	(Tajikistan)	Olimjon Juraev	Sardor	End of season	
20 February 2025	MF	(Tajikistan)	Shukhratdzhon Shonazarov	Sardor	End of season	

=== Released ===
Date	Position	Nationality	Name	Joined	Date	Ref
30 June 2025	MF	(Bosnia and Herzegovina)	Dženis Beganović	Retired		
16 July 2025	MF	(Nigeria)	Lawrence Nicholas	Al-Afreeki	5 October 2025	
16 July 2025	MF	(Nigeria)	Abubakar Umar	Shimal		
16 July 2025	MF	(Tajikistan)	Ruslan Khayloyev	Lotus Music	22 September 2025	
19 July 2025	DF	(Nigeria)	Joshua Akpudje	KTP	22 July 2025	
31 December 2025	GK	(Serbia)	Nikola Stošić	Khorazm	7 January 2026	
31 December 2025	DF	(Albania)	Rudolf Turkaj	Ferizaj	18 January 2026	
31 December 2025	DF	(Tajikistan)	Akhtam Nazarov	Vakhsh Bokhtar	5 March 2026	
31 December 2025	FW	(Tajikistan)	Khaydar Sattorov	Istaravshan		
31 December 2025	DF	(Uzbekistan)	Marlen Chobanov	Erbil	1 January 2026	
31 December 2025	MF	(Iran)	Siavash Hagh Nazari	AGMK	19 February 2026	
31 December 2025	MF	(Iran)	Reza Dehghani	Alay	30 January 2026	
31 December 2025	MF	(Nigeria)	Joseph Okoro	Serikspor	8 January 2026	
31 December 2025	MF	(Tajikistan)	Ehson Panjshanbe	Terengganu	9 January 2026	
31 December 2025	MF	(Tajikistan)	Shukhratdzhon Shonazarov	Khujand	13 January 2026	
31 December 2025	FW	(Nigeria)	Paul Komolafe	Newroz	6 February 2026	
31 December 2025	FW	(Tajikistan)	Mekhron Madaminov	Barkchi Hisor		

=== Trial ===
Date From	Position	Nationality	Name	Last club	Date To	Ref.
July 2025	MF	(Russia)	Kirill Korolkov	Spartak Kostroma		

== Friendlies ==
28 January 2025	Istiklol	1–1	Vakhsh Bokhtar	Dushanbe
14:00 (UTC+5)	Dzhalilov 37'	Report	Bozorov 51'	Stadium: Pamir Stadium

6 February 2025	Istiklol	1–0	Regar-TadAZ	Dushanbe
14:00 (UTC+5)	Gafurov 81'	Report		Stadium: Pamir Stadium; Referee: Rustam Nurmatov

14 February 2025	Istiklol	–	Urartu	United Arab Emirates
(UTC+5)

17 February 2025	Istiklol	–	Dinamo Samarqand	United Arab Emirates
(UTC+5)

21 February 2025	Istiklol	–	Rostov	United Arab Emirates
(UTC+5)

21 March 2025	Istiklol	1–1	Sardor	Dushanbe
16:00 (UTC+5)	Kurbanov 63'	Report	Khushvakhtov 61'	Stadium: Pamir Stadium; Referee: Amirjon Khorkashev

19 July 2025	BATE Borisov	1–2	Istiklol	Stayki, Belarus
14:00 (UTC+5)	Rusenchik 82'	Report	M.Dzhalilov 35'; Korolkov 84'	Stadium: Olympic Center

23 July 2025	Smorgon	2–1	Istiklol	Smarhon, Belarus
20:00 (UTC+5)	Chebotar 26'; Yablonsky 65'	Report	Soirov 20'	Stadium: Yunost Stadium; Attendance: 1,000; Referee: Valentina Sokolovich

3 September 2025	Regar-TadAZ	0–1	Istiklol	Tursunzoda
17:00 (UTC+5)		Report	Gafurov 62'	Stadium: TALCO Arena; Referee: Amirjon Khorkashev

=== FFT Cup ===
==== Preliminary group ====
Pos	Team	Pld	W	D	L	GF	GA	GD	Pts	Qualification
1	Istiklol	4	3	0	1	11	1	+10	9	Advance to Finals Stage
2	Khosilot Farkhor	1	1	0	0	1	0	+1	3	Advance to Finals Stage
3	Sardor	1	0	0	1	0	2	−2	0	
4	Barkchi Hisor	1	0	0	1	0	4	−4	0	
5	Hulbuk	1	0	0	1	0	5	−5	0	

Updated to match(es) played on 2 February 2025. Source:

21 January 2025 1	Istiklol	0–1	Khosilot Farkhor	Dushanbe
10:30 (UTC+5)		Report	Bahrizoda 80'	Stadium: Pamir Stadium; Referee: Mehrubon Shamsiddinov

24 January 2025 2	Istiklol	2–0	Sardor	Dushanbe
13:30 (UTC+5)	Kurbonov (red card) 37'; Gafurov 63', 85'	Report	Rashidbekov (red card) 37'; Akhmedov (red card) 78'; Khushvakhtov (yellow card)	Stadium: Pamir Stadium; Referee: Kurbonmurod Sharipov

30 January 2025 3	Hulbuk	0–5	Istiklol	Dushanbe
13:30 (UTC+5)		Report	Beganović 8'; Rakhimov 17', 21'; M.Dzhalilov 46'; Kamolov 54'	Stadium: Pamir Stadium; Referee: Amirjon Khorkashev

2 February 2025 4	Istiklol	4–0	Barkchi Hisor	Dushanbe
14:00 (UTC+5)	Rakhimov 13', 68'; Beganović 44'; Shonazarov 78'	Report		Stadium: Pamir Stadium; Referee: Mehrubon Shamsiddinov

==== Final Stage ====
Pos	Team	Pld	W	D	L	GF	GA	GD	Pts	Qualification
1	Istiklol	3	3	0	0	18	1	+17	9	Semi Finals
2	Somon	3	2	0	1	10	3	+7	6	Semi Finals
3	Regar-TadAZ	3	0	1	2	1	13	−12	1	
4	Sarazm	3	0	1	2	1	13	−12	1	

Updated to match(es) played on 2 February 2025. Source:

10 February 2025 1	Istiklol	3–1	Somon	Dushanbe
14:00 (UTC+5)	Gafurov 18' (pen.); Sulaymonov 48'; Rakhimov 52'	Report	Cholov 40'	Stadium: Pamir Stadium; Referee: Nasrullo Kabirov

12 February 2025 2	Istiklol	5–0	Regar-TadAZ	Dushanbe
14:00 (UTC+5)	Tokhiri 71' (pen.), 83'; Khayloyev 73'; Gafurov 77', 89'	Report		Stadium: Pamir Stadium

14 February 2025 3	Sarazm	0–10	Istiklol	Dushanbe
14:00 (UTC+5)		Report	6'; 24'; 34'; 36'; 38'; 46'; 59'; 60'; 75'; 78'; (red card) 87'	Stadium: Pamir Stadium

==== Knockout stage ====
18 February 2025 Semi final	Istiklol	2–0	Panjshir	Dushanbe
14:00 (UTC+5)	Dzhalilov 18', 75'	Report		Stadium: Pamir Stadium; Referee: Rustam Nurmatov

22 February 2025 Final	Istiklol	2–0	CSKA Pamir Dushanbe	Dushanbe
15:00 (UTC+5)	Beganović 20', 45+1'	Report		Stadium: Pamir Stadium; Attendance: 1,400; Referee: Bakhtiyor Komilov

== Competitions ==
=== Overview ===
Competition	First match	Last match	Starting round	Final position	Record							
Competition	First match	Last match	Starting round	Final position	Pld	W	D	L	GF	GA	GD	Win %
Higher League	7 March 2025	12 December 2025	Matchday 1	Winners	22	15	5	2	58	18	+40	68.18
Tajikistan Cup	1 August 2025	6 August 2025	Last 16	Quarterfinal	2	0	2	0	1	1	+0	0.00
Tajik Super Cup	25 May 2025	25 May 2025	Final	Winners	1	0	1	0	1	1	+0	0.00
AFC Champions League Two	17 September 2025	24 December 2025	Group Stage	Group Stage (3rd)	6	3	0	3	7	12	−5	50.00
Total					31	18	8	5	67	32	+35	58.06

Last updated: 24 December 2025
Source: Competitions

=== Tajik Supercup ===
25 May 2025	Istiklol	1–1 (a.e.t.) (5–4 p)	Regar-TadAZ	Hisar
19:00 (UTC+5)	Akpudje 83' (yellow card); Nicholas (yellow card)	Report	Makhamadiev 11' (pen.) (yellow card); Frimpong (red card) 45+3'; Panny (yellow card); Azimov (yellow card)	Stadium: Central Stadium; Attendance: 12,750; Referee: Gulmurodi Sadullo
	Penalties
	Nazarov (penalty scored); Gafurov (penalty scored); Sulaymonov (penalty scored); Juraboev (penalty scored); Kurbonov (penalty scored)		(penalty scored) Babadjanov; (penalty scored) Ergashev; (penalty scored) Makhamadiev; (penalty scored) Temirov; (penalty missed) Imomnazarov

=== Higher League ===
==== Regular season ====
===== Results summary =====
Overall								Home						Away					
Pld	W	D	L	GF	GA	GD	Pts	W	D	L	GF	GA	GD	W	D	L	GF	GA	GD
22	15	5	2	58	18	+40	50	9	2	0	29	8	+21	6	3	2	29	10	+19

Last updated: 12 December 2025.
Source: See Results

===== Results by round =====
Round	1	2	3	4	5	6	11	7	8	9	12	13	10	15	16	17	20	22	14	18	19	21
Ground	H	H	H	A	H	A	A	H	H	A	A	A	H	H	A	H	H	H	A	A	A	A
Result	W	W	D	W	W	W	D	W	D	L	L	W	W	W	D	W	W	W	W	W	D	W
Position	5	4	4	1	1	1	2	1	1	1	4	2	2	2	2	2	2	2	2	1	1	1

Source: Results
A = Away; H = Home; W = Win; D = Draw; L = Loss; P = Postponed

===== Results =====
7 March 2025 1	Istiklol	1–0	Khujand	Dushanbe
18:00 (UTC+5)	M.Dzhalilov 6'; Rakhimov (yellow card)	Report	Komolafe (yellow card) (yellow-red card) 63'; Firdavs Abdusalimov; Tskanyan (yellow card); Serdyuk (yellow card)	Stadium: Pamir Stadium; Attendance: 200; Referee: Nasrullo Kabirov

14 March 2025 2	Istiklol	2–1	Regar-TadAZ	Dushanbe
18:00 (UTC+5)	Kurbonov 7'; M.Dzhalilov 32' (pen.); Okoro (red card) 90+4'; A.Dzhalilov (yellow card)	Report	Frimpong 87'	Stadium: Pamir Stadium; Attendance: 1,000; Referee: Bakhtiyor Komilov
Note: Match originally scheduled to be played at Regar-TadAZ's regular TALCO Arena in Tursunzoda, but due to renovation work at the TALCO Arena, the match was moved to the Pamir Stadium in Dushanbe, with the reverse fixture later in the year being played at the TALCO Arena instead.

29 March 2025 3	Istiklol	1–1	Khosilot Farkhor	Dushanbe
18:00 (UTC+5)	M.Dzhalilov 12'; Akpudje (yellow card); Nicholas (yellow card); Jalilov (yellow card)	Report	Zoirov 83'; Abdugafforov (yellow card); Obama (yellow card); Ofori (yellow card)	Stadium: Pamir Stadium; Attendance: 400; Referee: Khurshed Dadaboyev

6 April 2025 4	Panjshir	0–3	Istiklol	Dushanbe
17:00 (UTC+5)	Azizov (red card) 10'; Saydaminov (red card) 20'; Hakimov (yellow card)	Report	M.Dzhalilov (yellow card) (red card) 20'; Juraboev 36'; Dehghani 45+2'; A.Dzhalilov 80'; Kamolov (yellow card)	Stadium: Pamir Stadium; Attendance: 320; Referee: Nasrullo Kabirov

12 April 2025 5	Istiklol	2–1	CSKA Pamir Dushanbe	Dushanbe
17:00 (UTC+5)	Juraboev 40'; Nicholas 69' (yellow card); Kurbonov (yellow card); A.Dzhalilov (yellow card)	Report	Mirzokhon 87'; Qosimov (yellow card)	Stadium: Pamir Stadium; Attendance: 1,000; Referee: Amirjon Khorkashev

20 April 2025 6	Barkchi Hisor	0–1	Istiklol	Hisar
17:00 (UTC+5)	Madaminov (yellow card); Landry (yellow card)	Report	Akpudje 56'; A.Dzhalilov (yellow card)	Stadium: Central Stadium; Attendance: 350; Referee: Bakhtiyor Komilov

26 April 2025 11	Eskhata Khujand	1–1	Istiklol	Khujand
17:00 (UTC+5)	Z.Tursunov 49'; Zaripov (yellow card); Samadov (yellow card); Khursandov (yellow card)	Report	Khakimov 51' (o.g.); Kamalov (yellow card); A.Dzhalilov (yellow card); Jalilov (yellow card); Kurbonov (yellow card)	Stadium: Spartak Stadium; Attendance: 4,000; Referee: Abdullo Davlatov

3 May 2025 7	Istiklol	2–0	Hulbuk	Dushanbe
18:00 (UTC+5)	Jalilov 52' (yellow card); Gafurov 90+4'; Sulaymonov (yellow card); Kamolov (yellow card)	Report	Murodov (yellow card)	Stadium: Pamir Stadium; Attendance: 500; Referee: Rustam Nurmatov

11 May 2025 8	Istiklol	0–0	Vakhsh Bokhtar	Dushanbe
18:00 (UTC+5)	A.Dzhalilov (yellow card)	Report	Boboev (yellow card); Bilonoh (yellow card); Naskov (yellow card)	Stadium: Pamir Stadium; Attendance: Nasrullo Kabirov; Referee: 2,000

17 May 2025 9	Ravshan Kulob	1–0	Istiklol	Kulob
18:00 (UTC+5)	Nazarov 38' (o.g.); Hrytsenko (yellow card); Markovych (yellow card); Safarov (yellow card)	Report	Islomov (yellow card); Nicholas (yellow card)	Stadium: Langari Langarieva Stadium; Attendance: 17,000; Referee: Gulmurodi Sa'dullo

18 June 2025 12	Khujand	1–0	Istiklol	Khujand
20:00 (UTC+5)	Komolafe 12' (yellow card); Bokiev (yellow card); Barotov (yellow card)	Report	Soirov (yellow card); Sulaymonov (yellow card)	Stadium: 20 Years of Independence Stadium; Attendance: 6,000; Referee: Sayyodjon Zainiddinov

22 June 2025 13	Regar-TadAZ	1–2	Istiklol	Dushanbe
19:00 (UTC+5)	Solekhov 78'; Feumba (yellow card); Pandzhiev (yellow card); Frimpong (yellow card)	Report	Kassim 17' (o.g.); A.Dzhalilov 32' (yellow card); Kurbonov (yellow card); Stošić (yellow card)	Stadium: Pamir Stadium; Attendance: 3,100; Referee: Nasrullo Kabirov

14 August 2025 10	Istiklol	6–0	Istaravshan	Hisar
19:00 (UTC+5)	Juraboev 1'; Dehghani 27', 48'; Safarov 75'; Soirov 83'; Kamolov 87'; Kurbonov (yellow card)	Report		Stadium: Central Stadium
Note: Match originally scheduled for 28 May 2025, but postponed due to international call ups.

19 August 2025 15	Istiklol	1–0	Panjshir	Hisar
19:00 (UTC+5)	Nazari 22' (pen.); Dehghani (yellow card)	Report		Stadium: Central Stadium; Referee: Navruz Vokhidov

11 September 2025 16	CSKA Pamir Dushanbe	3–3	Istiklol	Hisar
18:30 (UTC+5)	Lucas 68'; Davlatov 69'; Enyegue 76' (pen.); Ibrokhimov (yellow card)	Report	Panjshanbe 23'; Turkaj 36'; Juraboev 78'; Jalilov (yellow card)	Stadium: Central Stadium; Referee: Khurshed Dadaboev

21 September 2025 17	Istiklol	2–1	Barkchi Hisor	Tursunzoda
18:00 (UTC+5)	Soirov 55'; A.Dzhalilov 74'; Nazari (penalty missed) 90+2'; Panjshanbe (yellow card)	Report	Asante 47'; Muhammad (yellow card); Frimpong (yellow card)	Stadium: TALCO Arena; Referee: Abdullo Davlatov
Note: Match played at the TALCO Arena in Tursunzoda, instead of the Central Stadium in Hisar.

28 October 2025 20	Istiklol	6–2	Ravshan Kulob	Hisar
17:00 (UTC+5)	Soirov 22'; Nazari 27'; Juraboev 42' (pen.); Panjshanbe 78'; Gafurov 80'; Komolafe 90+4'; Kurbonov (yellow card)	Report	Ojetunde 11'; Boboev 52'; Makhsumov (yellow card); Khaitov (yellow card); Safarov (yellow card)	Stadium: Central Stadium; Attendance: 1,000; Referee: Gulmurodi Sa'dullo

10 November 2025 22	Istiklol	6–2	Eskhata Khujand	Hisar
15:00 (UTC+5)	Panjshanbe 8', 11'; Soirov 27', 49'; Rakhimov 68'; M.Dzhalilov 90+1'; Chobanov (yellow card)	Report	Kholmirzoev 84'; Yarbekov 87'; Zaripov (yellow card)	Stadium: Central Stadium; Referee: Bakhtiyor Kamilov

30 November 2025 14	Khosilot Farkhor	0–9	Istiklol	Hisar
14:00 (UTC+5)		Report	Dehghani 5'; Rakhimov 40' (yellow card); Komolafe 51', 55'; Soirov 60', 73', 87'; Dzhalilov 67'; Sulaymonov 75'	Stadium: Central Stadium
Note: Match initially scheduled for 9 August 2025.

4 December 2025 14	Hulbuk	1–5	Istiklol	Hisar
14:00 (UTC+5)	Khotam 45+2'; Kholmurodov (yellow card); Kofi (yellow card)	Report	Komolafe 4', 6'; Soirov 19' (pen.), 50'; M.Dzhalilov 27' (pen.); Safarov (yellow card)	Stadium: Training Centre; Referee: Amirjon Khorkashev

8 December 2025 18	Vakhsh Bokhtar	1–1	Istiklol	Bokhtar
14:00 (UTC+5)	Bilonoh 35' (pen.); Davlatov (yellow card); Barotov (yellow card)	Report	Nazari 27'; Safarov (yellow card); Islomov (yellow card); Soirov (yellow card); Komolafe (yellow card)	Stadium: Pakhtakor Stadium; Attendance: 5,500; Referee: Sayyodjon Zainiddinov
Note: Match initially scheduled for 18 October 2025.

12 December 2025 21	Istaravshan	1–4	Istiklol	Istaravshan
14:00 (UTC+5)	Fozilov 74'	Report	Chobanov 9'; Komolafe 18'; Gafurov 37'; Nazarov 51' (pen.)	Stadium: Istaravshan-Arena; Referee: Kurbanmurod Sharipov
Note: Match initially scheduled for 31 October 2025.

===== League table =====
Pos	Team	Pld	W	D	L	GF	GA	GD	Pts	Qualification or relegation
1	Istiklol (Q)	22	15	5	2	58	18	+40	50	Qualification for AFC Challenge League Qualifying play-off
2	Vakhsh Bokhtar	22	12	9	1	33	18	+15	45	Qualification for the Silk Way Cup group stage
3	CSKA Pamir	22	10	7	5	38	23	+15	37	Qualification for the Silk Way Cup qualifying round
4	Ravshan Kulob	22	8	11	3	26	20	+6	35	
5	Khujand	22	9	4	9	24	25	−1	31	

Source: Soccerway
Rules for classification: 1) Points; 2) Head-to-head points; 3) Head-to-head goal difference; 4) Head-to-head goals scored away; 5) Goal difference; 6) Goals scored.
(Q) Qualified for the phase indicated

=== Tajikistan Cup ===
1 August 2025 Last 16	Khujand	1–1 (5–6 p)	Istiklol	Khujand
20:00 (UTC+5)	Ergashev 21' (yellow card); Minosyan (yellow card); Abdusalimov (yellow card)	Report	A.Dzhalilov 41'; Juraboev (yellow card); Jalilov (yellow card); Okoro (yellow card)	Stadium: 20 Years of Independence Stadium; Attendance: 10,000; Referee: Nasrullo Kabirov
	Penalties
	Sanginboev (penalty scored); Nishonboyzoda (penalty scored); Karaev (penalty scored); Nuriddinov (penalty scored); Shukurov (penalty scored); Abdusalimov (penalty missed)		(penalty scored) A.Dzhalilov; (penalty scored) Nazari; (penalty scored) Sulaymonov; (penalty scored) Safarov; (penalty scored) Juraboev; (penalty scored) Komolafe

6 August 2025 Quarterfinal	Vakhsh Bokhtar	0–0 (4–2 p)	Istiklol	Bokhtar
16:45 (UTC+5)	Cherniy (yellow card); Asrorov (yellow card)	Report	Panjshanbe (yellow card); Okoro (yellow card); Komolafe (yellow card)	Stadium: Pakhtakor Stadium; Attendance: 5,000; Referee: Abdullo Davlatov
	Penalties
	Asrorov (penalty scored); Tsankyan (penalty scored); Sulaymonov (penalty missed); Tagoyzoda (penalty scored); Fatkhulloyev (penalty scored)		(penalty missed) Panjshanbe; (penalty scored) Nazari; (penalty missed) Sulaymonov; (penalty scored) Komolafe

=== AFC Champions League Two ===
==== Group stage ====
Pos	Team	Pld	W	D	L	GF	GA	GD	Pts	Qualification
1	(Saudi Arabia) Al-Nassr	6	6	0	0	22	2	+20	18	Advance to round of 16
2	(Iraq) Al-Zawraa	6	3	0	3	8	11	−3	9	Advance to round of 16
3	(Tajikistan) Istiklol	6	3	0	3	7	13	−6	9	
4	(India) Goa	6	0	0	6	3	14	−11	0	

Source: ACL2
Rules for classification: Tiebreakers

17 September 2025 1	Al-Nassr (Saudi Arabia)	5–0	(Tajikistan) Istiklol	Riyadh, Saudi Arabia
23:15 (UTC+5)	Al-Amri (yellow card) 8'; Ghareeb 14'; Gabriel 17'; Wesley 59' (yellow card) 81'; Coman 89'; Mané 90+3'	Report	Okoro (yellow card) 49'; Jalilov (yellow card) 51'	Stadium: Al-Awwal Park; Attendance: 6,038; Referee: Ko Hyung-jin (South Korea)

1 October 2025 2	Istiklol (Tajikistan)	2–0	(India) Goa	Hisor, Tajikistan
18:45 (UTC+5)	Safarov (yellow card) 2'; Soirov 46'; Dehghani 74' (yellow card) 75'; Kamolov (yellow card) 90'	Report	U.Singh (yellow card) 69'	Stadium: Central Stadium; Attendance: 5,750; Referee: Thoriq Alkatiri (Indonesia)

22 October 2025 3	Istiklol (Tajikistan)	2–1	(Iraq) Al-Zawraa	Hisor, Tajikistan
18:45 (UTC+5)	Rakhimov (yellow card) 14'; Juraboev 20'; Okoro (yellow card) 47'; Soirov (yellow card) 52'; Komolafe 84'	Report	Tomiwa 4'; Nabeel (yellow card) 82'; Hassan (yellow card) 85'	Stadium: Central Stadium; Attendance: 6,420; Referee: Ahmed Al-Ali (Kuwait)

5 November 2025 4	Al-Zawraa (Iraq)	2–1	(Tajikistan) Istiklol	Baghdad, Iraq
21:00 (UTC+5)	Abdulkareem 7'; Kadhim (yellow card) 34'; Tomiwa 53' (pen.); Bitang (yellow card) 68'	Report	Gafurov (yellow card) 59'; Juraboev 64' (pen.); Safarov (yellow card) 85'	Stadium: Al Zawraa Stadium; Attendance: 11,700; Referee: Ahmed Eisa Darwish (United Arab Emirates)

26 November 2025 5	Istiklol (Tajikistan)	0–3	(Saudi Arabia) Al-Nassr	Hisor, Tajikistan
18:45 (UTC+5)	Okoro (yellow card) 18'	Report	Félix 12' (pen.); Simakan 41'; Mané 84'; Al-Ghannam (yellow card) 90'; Yahya 90+2'	Stadium: Central Stadium; Attendance: 15,150; Referee: Alex King (Australia)

24 December 2025 6	Goa (India)	1–2	(Tajikistan) Istiklol	Goa, India
23:30 (UTC+5)	Dražić 8'; Thangjam (yellow card) 73'	Report	Panjshanbe (yellow card) 29'; Komolafe 53'; Juraboev 56' (pen.); Kurbonov (yellow card) 70' (yellow-red card) 74'	Stadium: Jawaharlal Nehru Stadium; Attendance: 1,083; Referee: Ammar Mahfoodh (Bahrain)

== Squad statistics ==
As of match played 24 December 2025

=== Appearances and goals ===
No.	Pos	Nat	Player	Total		Higher League		Tajikistan Cup		Super Cup		AFC Champions League Two	
No.	Pos	Nat	Player	Apps	Goals	Apps	Goals	Apps	Goals	Apps	Goals	Apps	Goals
1	GK	(Serbia) SRB	Nikola Stošić	21	0	12	0	2	0	1	0	6	0
3	DF	(Tajikistan) TJK	Tabrez Islomov	28	0	16+5	0	1+1	0	1	0	2+2	0
4	DF	(Uzbekistan) UZB	Marlen Chobanov	16	1	8+1	1	1	0	0	0	6	0
5	DF	(Tajikistan) TJK	Sodikjon Kurbonov	22	1	15	1	1	0	1	0	5	0
6	MF	(Tajikistan) TJK	Amirbek Juraboev	27	8	17+1	5	2	0	1	0	5+1	3
8	MF	(Iran) IRI	Siavash Hagh Nazari	15	3	5+3	3	0+2	0	0	0	5	0
9	FW	(Tajikistan) TJK	Rustam Soirov	26	11	9+8	10	2	0	1	0	5+1	1
10	MF	(Tajikistan) TJK	Alisher Dzhalilov	19	4	14	3	2	1	1	0	2	0
11	MF	(Tajikistan) TJK	Mukhammadzhon Rakhimov	25	2	13+5	2	0+1	0	1	0	5	0
12	MF	(Tajikistan) TJK	Mehrubon Odilzoda	4	0	1+3	0	0	0	0	0	0	0
13	FW	(Tajikistan) TJK	Mukhammad Nazriev	6	0	0+5	0	0	0	0+1	0	0	0
15	DF	(Russia) RUS	Kirill Suslov	11	0	6+1	0	1	0	0	0	1+2	0
17	MF	(Tajikistan) TJK	Ehson Panjshanbe	14	4	6	4	2	0	0	0	6	0
19	DF	(Tajikistan) TJK	Akhtam Nazarov	22	1	12+6	1	2	0	0+1	0	0+1	0
21	DF	(Tajikistan) TJK	Romish Jalilov	18	1	12+2	1	1+1	0	1	0	1	0
28	FW	(Tajikistan) TJK	Masrur Gafurov	20	3	4+11	3	0	0	0+1	0	0+4	0
33	MF	(Nigeria) NGR	Joseph Okoro	21	0	12+2	0	2	0	0	0	5	0
43	FW	(Nigeria) NGR	Paul Komolafe	17	8	5+4	6	0+2	0	0	0	2+4	2
55	DF	(Tajikistan) TJK	Manuchekhr Safarov	17	1	6+3	1	1+1	0	0	0	5+1	0
63	FW	(Tajikistan) TJK	Manuchekhr Dzhalilov	14	6	10+3	6	0	0	0	0	1	0
66	DF	(Tajikistan) TJK	Rustam Kamolov	13	1	4+7	1	0	0	0	0	0+2	0
70	MF	(Tajikistan) TJK	Shahrom Sulaymonov	11	1	1+6	1	0+2	0	0+1	0	0+1	0
77	MF	(Iran) IRI	Reza Dehghani	25	5	13+5	4	2	0	1	0	2+2	1
95	DF	(Albania) ALB	Rudolf Turkaj	9	1	6+1	1	0	0	0	0	2	0
99	GK	(Tajikistan) TJK	Mukhriddin Khasanov	10	0	10	0	0	0	0	0	0	0
Youth team players:
Players away from Istiklol on loan:
Players who left Istiklol during the season:
18	MF	(Tajikistan) TJK	Ruslan Khayloyev	2	0	1+1	0	0	0	0	0	0	0
24	MF	(Nigeria) NGR	Lawrence Nicholas	10	1	9	1	0	0	1	0	0	0
44	DF	(Nigeria) NGR	Joshua Akpudje	13	2	12	1	0	0	1	1	0	0

=== Goal scorers ===
Place	Position	Nation	Number	Name	Higher League	Tajikistan Cup	Super Cup	AFC Champions League Two	Total
1	FW	(Tajikistan)	9	Rustam Soirov	10	0	0	1	11
2	FW	(Nigeria)	43	Paul Komolafe	6	0	0	2	8
2	MF	(Tajikistan)	6	Amirbek Juraboev	5	0	0	3	8
4	FW	(Tajikistan)	63	Manuchekhr Dzhalilov	6	0	0	0	6
5	MF	(Iran)	77	Reza Dehghani	4	0	0	1	5
6	MF	(Tajikistan)	17	Ehson Panjshanbe	4	0	0	0	4
6	MF	(Tajikistan)	10	Alisher Dzhalilov	3	1	0	0	4
8	MF	(Iran)	8	Siavash Hagh Nazari	3	0	0	0	3
8	FW	(Tajikistan)	28	Masrur Gafurov	3	0	0	0	3
10	MF	(Tajikistan)	11	Mukhammadzhon Rakhimov	2	0	0	0	2
10	DF	(Nigeria)	44	Joshua Akpudje	1	0	1	0	2
10				Own goal	2	0	0	0	2
13	DF	(Tajikistan)	5	Sodikjon Kurbonov	1	0	0	0	1
13	MF	(Nigeria)	24	Lawrence Nicholas	1	0	0	0	1
13	DF	(Tajikistan)	21	Romish Jalilov	1	0	0	0	1
13	DF	(Tajikistan)	55	Manuchekhr Safarov	1	0	0	0	1
13	DF	(Tajikistan)	66	Rustam Kamalov	1	0	0	0	1
13	DF	(Albania)	95	Rudolf Turkaj	1	0	0	0	1
13	MF	(Tajikistan)	70	Shahrom Sulaymonov	1	0	0	0	1
13	DF	(Uzbekistan)	4	Marlen Chobanov	1	0	0	0	1
13	DF	(Tajikistan)	19	Akhtam Nazarov	1	0	0	0	1
TOTALS					58	1	1	7	67

=== Clean sheets ===
Place	Position	Nation	Number	Name	Higher League	Tajikistan Cup	Super Cup	AFC Champions League Two	Total
2	GK	(Tajikistan)	99	Mukhriddin Khasanov	5	0	0	0	5
2	GK	(Serbia)	1	Nikola Stošić	3	1	0	1	5
TOTALS					8	1	0	1	10

=== Disciplinary record ===
Number	Nation	Position	Name	Higher League		Tajikistan Cup		Super Cup		AFC Champions League Two		Total	
Number	Nation	Position	Name	Yellow card	Red card	Yellow card	Red card	Yellow card	Red card	Yellow card	Red card	Yellow card	Red card
1	(Serbia)	GK	Nikola Stošić	1	0	0	0	0	0	0	0	1	0
3	(Tajikistan)	DF	Tabrez Islomov	2	0	0	0	0	0	0	0	2	0
4	(Uzbekistan)	DF	Marlen Chobanov	1	0	0	0	0	0	0	0	1	0
5	(Tajikistan)	DF	Sodikjon Kurbonov	5	0	0	0	0	0	2	1	7	1
6	(Tajikistan)	MF	Amirbek Juraboev	0	0	1	0	0	0	0	0	1	0
9	(Tajikistan)	FW	Rustam Soirov	2	0	0	0	0	0	1	0	3	0
10	(Tajikistan)	MF	Alisher Dzhalilov	6	0	0	0	0	0	0	0	6	0
11	(Tajikistan)	MF	Mukhammadzhon Rakhimov	2	0	0	0	0	0	1	0	3	0
17	(Tajikistan)	MF	Ehson Panjshanbe	1	0	1	0	0	0	1	0	3	0
21	(Tajikistan)	DF	Romish Jalilov	4	0	1	0	0	0	1	0	6	0
28	(Tajikistan)	FW	Masrur Gafurov	0	0	0	0	0	0	1	0	1	0
33	(Nigeria)	MF	Joseph Okoro	0	1	2	0	0	0	3	0	4	1
43	(Nigeria)	FW	Paul Komolafe	1	0	1	0	0	0	0	0	2	0
55	(Tajikistan)	DF	Manuchekhr Safarov	2	0	0	0	0	0	2	0	4	0
63	(Tajikistan)	FW	Manuchekhr Dzhalilov	1	1	0	0	0	0	0	0	1	1
66	(Tajikistan)	DF	Rustam Kamolov	3	0	0	0	0	0	1	0	4	0
70	(Tajikistan)	MF	Shahrom Sulaymonov	2	0	0	0	0	0	0	0	2	0
77	(Iran)	MF	Reza Dehghani	1	0	0	0	0	0	1	0	2	0
Players who left Istiklol during the season:
24	(Nigeria)	MF	Lawrence Nicholas	3	0	0	0	1	0	0	0	4	0
44	(Nigeria)	DF	Joshua Akpudje	1	0	0	0	1	0	0	0	2	0
			TOTALS	38	2	6	0	2	0	14	1	60	3
