= 2025 Tajikistan Higher League =

Tajikistan Higher League
- Season: 2025
- Dates: 7 March 2025 - 12 December 2025
- Champions: Istiklol (14th title)
- Relegated: Hulbuk; Panjshir
- AFC Challenge League: Istiklol
- CAFA Silk Way Cup: Vakhsh Bokhtar; CSKA Pamir
- Matches: 174
- Goals: 338 (1.94 per match)
- Top goalscorer: Paul Komolafe (12)
- Biggest home win: Ravshan Kulob 4–1 Khujand (29 March 2025); CSKA Pamir 4–1 Istaravshan (10 May 2025)
- Biggest away win: Khosilot Farkhor 0–9 Istiklol (30 November 2025)
- Highest scoring: Khosilot Farkhor 0–9 Istiklol (30 November 2025)
- Longest winning run: CSKA Pamir Dushanbe (6)
- Longest unbeaten run: Vakhsh Bokhtar (16)
- Longest winless run: Hulbuk (19)
- Longest losing run: Panjshir (5)
- Highest attendance: 17,000 - Ravshan Kulob vs Istiklol (17 May 2025)
- Lowest attendance: 0 - Vakhsh Bokhtar vs Eskhata (9 March 2025)
- Total attendance: 166,860
- Average attendance: 2,961 (18 May 2025)

The 2025 Tajikistan Top League (Tajik: 2025 Лигаи Олии Тоҷикистон, Russian: 2025 Высшая Лига Таджикистана), also known as 1xBet Higher League due to sponsorship reasons, was the 34th season of the Tajikistan Higher League, Tajikistan's top division of association football.

== Season events ==
At the end of the previous season, the Tajikistan Football Federation announced that Kuktosh Rudaki had been relegated to the Tajikistan First League, with Hulbuk being promoted in their place.

== Teams ==
Locations of teams in the 2025 Tajikistan Higher League

Team	Location	Venue	Capacity
Barkchi Hisor	Hisor	Central Stadium Hisor	3,000
CSKA Pamir	Dushanbe	CSKA Stadium	7,000
Eskhata	Khujand	Bistsolagii Istiqloliyati Stadium	20,000
Istaravshan	Istaravshan	Istaravshan-Arena	20,000
Istiklol	Dushanbe	Central Republican Stadium	24,000
Hosilot Farkhor	Farkhor	Central Stadium	
Hulbuk	Hulbuk	Central Stadium	1,000
Khujand	Khujand	Bistsolagii Istiqloliyati Stadium	20,000
Panjsher	Balkh	Panjsher Stadium	8,500
Ravshan	Kulob	Kulob-Arena	
Regar-TadAZ	Tursunzoda	TALCO Arena	10,000
Vakhsh Bokhtar	Bokhtar	Stadium Vakhsh	10,000

=== Personnel and sponsoring ===
Team	Manager	Captain	Kit manufacturer	Sponsor
Barkchi Hisor	(Tajikistan) Alifbek Beromov			Barqi Tojik
CSKA Pamir	(Tajikistan) Tokhirdzon Muminov			
Eskhata	(Tajikistan) Shukhrat Umarov			Bank Eskhata
Istaravshan	(Tajikistan) Shuhrat Shamsiev			
Istiklol	(Tajikistan) Igor Cherevchenko			Siyoma
Khosilot Farkhor	(Tajikistan) Zainiddin Rahimov			Formulla 55
Hulbuk	(Tajikistan) Jaoloddin Machidov			
Khujand	(Russia) Aleksandr Krestinin			Formulla 55
Panjsher	(Tajikistan) Bakhtiyor Khakimov			
Ravshan Kulob	(Russia) Dmitri Cheryshev			Hoji Sharif
Regar-TadAZ	(Tajikistan) Alisher Tukhtaev			Talco
Vakhsh Bokhtar	(Tajikistan) Zarif Usmonov			

=== Foreign players ===
During the 2025 season, Tajikistan Higher League are able to register seven foreign players, with only five being able to be on the pitch at the same time.

Club	Player 1	Player 2	Player 3	Player 4	Player 5	Player 6	Player 7	Former Players
Barkchi Hisor	(Cameroon) Étienne Landry Onana	(Ghana) Patrick Arthur	(Ghana) Fredrick Asante	(Ghana) Ramin Doobi	(Ghana) Boateng Frimpong	(Ghana) Quaye Godson	(Ghana) Kamal Mohammed	
CSKA Pamir	(Cameroon) Gerard Bakinde	(Cameroon) Francois Enyegue	(Cameroon) Jean Gatten	(Cameroon) Kevin Lucas	(Ghana) Anani Kwasi	(Ghana) Cobblah Prince	(Ghana) Dua Daniel Kyukou	(Ghana) Alex Jemfa
Eskhata	(Uzbekistan) Sardorbek Khursandov	(Uzbekistan) Sanzhar Rikhsiboev	(Uzbekistan) Bekzod Sayidov	(Uzbekistan) Diyorbek Shavkiev	(Uzbekistan) Izzatulla Tursunov	(Uzbekistan) Zoir Tursunov	(Uzbekistan) Abdulbori Vosidzhonov	(Uzbekistan) Khamidullo Abdukhamidov (Uzbekistan) Mirzhalol Kosimov
Istaravshan	(Cameroon) Stephane Onguene	(Ghana) George Attram	(Iran) Hossein Nosratabadi	(Uzbekistan) Tulkin Eragshev	(Uzbekistan) Bobur Kosimov	(Uzbekistan) Abdujalil Manazarov	(Uzbekistan) Jahongir Safarov	(Uzbekistan) Sukhrob Berdiev (Uzbekistan) Mirzohid Mirzomakhmudov (Uzbekistan) Sardorbek Saidov (Uzbekistan) Shahzod Shamsiddinov
Istiklol	(Albania) Rudolf Turkaj	(Iran) Reza Dehghani	(Iran) Siavash Hagh Nazari	(Nigeria) Paul Komolafe	(Nigeria) Joseph Okoro	(Russia) Kirill Suslov	(Uzbekistan) Marlen Chobanov	(Bosnia and Herzegovina) Dženis Beganović (Nigeria) Umar Abubakar (Nigeria) Joshua Akpudje (Nigeria) Lawrence Nicholas
Khosilot Farkhor	(Cameroon) Willy Kapawa	(Cameroon) Arsene Bilé Obama	(Cameroon) Ngombe Mbengue	(Ghana) Bortey Acquaye	(Ghana) Joseph Akomadi	(Ghana) Christian Gyan	(Nigeria) Sunday Song (Russia) Fayziddin Nazhmov	(Ghana) Samuel Ofori
Hulbuk	(Ghana) Chris Kofi Addo	(Ghana) Kwasi Addo	(Ghana) Prosper Gbeku	(Iran) Vafa Hakhamaneshi	(Iran) Aahkan Pajoukhan	(Uzbekistan) Zafar Ismailov		(Cameroon) Franklin Bamayangona (Iran) Farzin Moradi
Khujand	(Montenegro) Igor Vukčević	(Russia) Grigoriy Minosyan	(Russia) Nikita Zheymo	(Ukraine) Yevgeniy Terzi	(Uzbekistan) Firdavs Abdusalimov	(Uzbekistan) Asilzhon Begimkulov	(Uzbekistan) Shakhboz Nuriddinov	(Ghana) David Mawutor (Nigeria) Paul Komolafe (Russia) Artyom Serdyuk (Russia) Sergey Tsankyan (Uzbekistan) Islom Toshpulatov
Panjsher	(Cameroon) Ngangue Ntengue Dorian	(Cameroon) Ayisi Mael	(Ghana) Peter Sarkodie	(Iran) Salar Nosrati	(Uzbekistan) Ayubkhon Alimov	(Uzbekistan) Jahongir Fazilov	(Uzbekistan) Khasanboy Kakhkhorov (Uzbekistan) Rustam Kuchkorov	(Cameroon) Anaba Touna (Ghana) Christian Gyan (Iran) Mehdi Babri
Ravshan Kulob	(Cameroon) Audrey Zepatta	(Ghana) Ishmael Antwi	(Nigeria) Chukwuebuka Okoronkwo	(Nigeria) Olaoluwa Ojetunde	(Serbia) Milos Milovanovic	(Ukraine) Yevhen Hrytsenko	(Ukraine) Andriy Markovych	(Ukraine) Oleksiy Helovani
Regar-TadAZ	(Cameroon) David Atsam	(Cameroon) Joseph Feumba	(Cameroon) Manuel Tresor Panny	(Ghana) Kwadwo Frimpong	(Ghana) Osuman Kassim	(Uzbekistan) Samandar Kodirov	(Uzbekistan) Asilbek Temirov	
Vakhsh Bokhtar	(Cameroon) Tony Bikatal	(Ghana) Benjamin Amponsah	(Slovakia) Adam Kovac	(Russia) Sergey Tsankyan	(Ukraine) Dmytro Bilonoh	(Ukraine) Kostyantyn Cherniy	(Ukraine) Serhiy Yavorskyi	

In bold: Players that have been capped for their national team.

=== Managerial changes ===
Team	Outgoing manager	Manner of departure	Date of vacancy	Position in table	Incoming manager	Date of appointment
Eskhata	(Russia) Igor Surov			Preseason	(Tajikistan) Shukhrat Umarov	12 February 2025
Istaravshan	(Uzbekistan) Numon Khasanov			Preseason	(Tajikistan) Shuhrat Shamsiev	13 February 2025
Khujand	(Tajikistan) Rustam Khojayev		1 July 2025	5th	(Russia) Aleksandr Krestinin	4 July 2025

== Regular season ==
=== League table ===
Pos	Team	Pld	W	D	L	GF	GA	GD	Pts	Qualification or relegation
1	Istiklol (Q)	22	15	5	2	58	18	+40	50	Qualification for AFC Challenge League Qualifying play-off
2	Vakhsh Bokhtar	22	12	9	1	33	18	+15	45	Qualification for the Silk Way Cup group stage
3	CSKA Pamir	22	10	7	5	38	23	+15	37	Qualification for the Silk Way Cup qualifying round
4	Ravshan Kulob	22	8	11	3	26	20	+6	35	
5	Khujand	22	9	4	9	24	25	−1	31	
6	Eskhata	22	7	9	6	31	30	+1	30	
7	Regar-TadAZ	22	8	6	8	25	24	+1	30	
8	Barkchi Hisor	22	6	9	7	22	20	+2	27	
9	Hosilot Farkhor	22	6	6	10	27	38	−11	24	
10	Istaravshan	22	4	7	11	23	42	−19	19	
11	Hulbuk (R)	22	2	7	13	15	39	−24	13	Qualification to relegation play-offs
12	Panjshir (R)	22	2	6	14	16	41	−25	12	Relegation to Tajik First Division

Source: Soccerway
Rules for classification: 1) Points; 2) Head-to-head points; 3) Head-to-head goal difference; 4) Head-to-head goals scored away; 5) Goal difference; 6) Goals scored.
(Q) Qualified for the phase indicated; (R) Relegated

=== Results ===
Home \ Away	BAR	CPD	ESK	ISA	IST	KHF	KJD	HUL	PAN	RAV	REG	VAK
Barkchi Hisor		0–0	1–0	0–0	0–1	0–1	0–1	2–1	0–0	1–2	0–1	1–0
CSKA Pamir	3–3		3–3	4–1	3–3	2–1	2–1	0–0	5–1	0–1	1–0	1–2
Eskhata	1–1	0–2		0–0	1–1	2–1	1–2	1–1	1–0	1–0	3–0	1–1
Istaravshan	2–0	2–1	2–2		1–4	1–1	1–1	2–1	2–1	1–3	2–4	2–3
Istiklol	2–1	2–1	6–2	6–0		1–1	1–0	2–0	1–0	6–2	2–1	0–0
Hosilot Farkhor	0–3	1–2	1–0	1–1	0–9		3–1	1–0	2–1	2–2	2–3	1–1
Khujand	1–1	0–0	0–1	1–0	1–0	2–1		1–0	3–0	1–2	1–0	1–2
Hulbuk	0–2	0–3	2–5	1–0	1–5	2–5	1–2		1–1	1–1	0–3	0–2
Panjshir	0–2	0–3	2–4	1–0	0–3	1–1	2–2	0–2		1–1	1–2	2–3
Ravshan Kulob	2–2	0–0	0–0	1–1	1–0	2–1	4–1	0–0	0–0		0–0	0–0
Regar-TadAZ	0–0	0–1	1–1	4–2	1–2	1–0	2–1	0–0	1–2	0–2		1–1
Vakhsh Bokhtar	2–2	2–1	3–1	2–0	1–1	1–0	2–1	1–1	2–0	1–0	1–1	

Source: Soccerway
Legend: Blue = home team win; Yellow = draw; Red = away team win.

=== Results by round ===
Team ╲ Round	1	2	3	4	5	6	7	8	9	10	11	12
Barkchi Hisor	L	W	D	D	W	L	D	L	L	W	D	D
CSKA Pamir	W	W	D	D	L	L	D	W	W	W	W	W
Eskhata	L	W	D	W	L	D	W	W	L	L	D	D
Istaravshan	D	L	D	L	L	D	W	L	W	P	L	L
Istiklol	W	W	D	W	W	W	W	D	L	P	D	L
Hosilot Farkhor	L	L	D	D	L	D	L	W	L	W	W	L
Hulbuk	W	W	D	L	L	L	L	L	D	L	D	D
Khujand	L	L	L	W	W	W	W	L	W	L	D	W
Panjshir	L	L	D	L	L	D	L	L	L	L	L	D
Ravshan Kulob	D	L	W	W	W	D	D	W	W	L	D	W
Regar-TadAZ	W	L	D	L	W	D	L	W	W	W	L	D
Vakhsh Bokhtar	W	W	D	D	W	W	D	D	D	W	W	D

Source: Soccerway
W = Win; D = Draw; L = Loss; P = Postponed

== Relegation play-off ==
=== First leg ===
7 December 2025
14:00 (UTC+5)

Hulbuk	2–2	Sardor Tursunzade
	Report

Pamir Stadium, Dushanbe

=== Second leg ===
10 December 2025
13:00 (UTC+5)

Sardor Tursunzade	2–0	Hulbuk
	Report

Pamir Stadium, Dushanbe

== Season statistics ==
=== Scoring ===
- First goal of the season: Anani Kwasi for CSKA Pamir Dushanbe against Khosilot Farkhor. (7 March 2025)

=== Top scorers ===
As of matches played 12 December 2025

Rank	Player	Club	Goals
1	(Nigeria) Paul Komolafe	Khujand / Istiklol	12
2	(Tajikistan) Rustam Soirov	Istiklol	10
3	(Ghana) Kwadwo Frimpong	Regar-TadAZ	8
3	(Ukraine) Dmytro Bilonoh	Vakhsh Bokhtar	8
5	(Nigeria) Olaoluwa Ojetunde	Ravshan Kulob	7
5	(Tajikistan) Azizbek Daliev	Barkchi Hisor	7
5	(Cameroon) Ngombe Mbengue	Khosilot Farkhor	7
8	(Tajikistan) Sunatullo Ismoilov	Vakhsh Bokhtar	6
8	(Ghana) Fredrick Asante	Barkchi Hisor	6
8	(Tajikistan) Abdukhalil Boronov	CSKA Pamir Dushanbe	6
8	(Ghana) Joseph Akomadi	Khosilot Farkhor	6
8	(Tajikistan) Manuchekhr Dzhalilov	Istiklol	6

Own goals:

- (Tajikistan) Barakatullo Nigmatullozoda – for Regar-TadAZ vs Barkchi Hisor 10 March 2025
- (Tajikistan) Komron Ibrokhimov – for Barkchi Hisor vs CSKA Pamir Dushanbe 4 April 2025
- (Tajikistan) Alisher Salimov – for Barkchi Hisor vs Hulbuk 11 April 2025
- (Cameroon) Audrey Zepatta – for Khosilot Farkhor vs Ravshan Kulob 13 April 2025
- (Tajikistan) Sokhibdzhon Khakimov – for Istiklol vs Eskhata Khujand 26 April 2025
- (Tajikistan) Akhtam Nazarov – for Ravshan Kulob vs Istiklol 17 May 2025

=== Clean sheets ===
As of matches played 18 May 2025

Rank	Player	Club	Goals
1	(Ghana) Prosper Gbeku	Hulbuk	4
1	(Ukraine) Yevhen Hrytsenko	Ravshan Kulob	4
3	(Serbia) Nikola Stošić	Istiklol	3
3	(Ghana) Cobblah Prince	CSKA Pamir	3
5	(Tajikistan) Khusniddini Makhmadali	CSKA Pamir	2
5	(Ghana) Quaye Godson	Barkchi Hisor	2
5	(Tajikistan) Mukhriddin Khasanov	Istiklol	2
5	(Tajikistan) Daler Barotov	Khujand	2
5	(Slovakia) Adam Kovac	Vakhsh Bokhtar	2
5	(Cameroon) Manuel Tresor Panny	Regar-TadAZ	2
11	(Tajikistan) Izatullo Tursunov	Eskhata	1
11	(Tajikistan) Khodzhimurod Salokhiddinov	Panjshir	1
11	(Tajikistan) Shahzod Shamsiddinov	Istaravshan	1
11	(Tajikistan) Dilshod Dadoboev	Khujand	1

=== Discipline ===
==== Red cards ====
As of match played 18 May 2025

- (Nigeria) Paul Komolafe - Istiklol vs Khujand (7 March 2025)
- (Ukraine) Yevhen Hrytsenko - Ravshan Kulob vs Istaravshan (9 March 2025)
- (Tajikistan) Mekhrubon Gafforzoda - Barkchi Hisor vs Regar-TadAZ (10 March 2025)
- (Tajikistan) Sherzod Radjabov - Barkchi Hisor vs Regar-TadAZ (10 March 2025)
- (Tajikistan) Daler Imomnazarov - Barkchi Hisor vs Regar-TadAZ (10 March 2025)
- (Uzbekistan) Diyorbek Shavkiev - Eskhata vs Ravshan Kulob (14 March 2025)
- (Nigeria) Joseph Okoro - Istiklol vs Regar-TadAZ (14 March 2025)
- (Russia) Artyom Serdyuk - Khujand vs Vakhsh Bokhtar (15 March 2025)
- (Tajikistan) Davronjon Ergashev - Ravshan Kulob vs Khujand (29 March 2025)
- (Tajikistan) Saidkhodzha Mukhammad Sharifi - Khosilot Farkhor vs Vakhsh Bokhtar (5 April 2025)
- (Tajikistan) Ravshan Azizov - Panjshir vs Istiklol (6 April 2025)
- (Tajikistan) Davlatbek Saydaminov - Panjshir vs Istiklol (6 April 2025)
- (Tajikistan) Manuchekhr Dzhalilov - Panjshir vs Istiklol (6 April 2025)
- (Ghana) David Mawutor - Hulbuk vs Khujand (18 April 2025)
- (Tajikistan) Sorbon Giyosov - Panjshir vs Ravshan Kulob (19 April 2025)
- (Tajikistan) Firdavs Alinazarov - Panjshir vs Ravshan Kulob (19 April 2025)
- (Tajikistan) Mekhron Madaminov - Khujand vs Barkchi Hisor (25 April 2025)
- (Tajikistan) Faridun Davlatov - Regar-TadAZ vs CSKA Pamir (25 April 2025)
- (Cameroon) Ngangue Ntengue Dorian - Panjshir vs Eskhata (9 May 2025)
- (Tajikistan) Zainuloh Mizoabdulloyev - Hulbuk vs Regar-TadAZ (11 May 2025)
- (Tajikistan) Sharafdzhon Solekhov - Hulbuk vs Regar-TadAZ (11 May 2025)

=== Attendances ===
As of match played 18 May 2025

==== By round ====
2024 Tajikistan Top League Attendances
Round	Total	GP.	Avg. Per Game
Round 1	3,800	6	633
Round 2	4,350	6	725
Round 3	8,020	6	1,337
Round 4	17,220	6	2,870
Round 5	28,550	6	4,758
Round 6	6,350	6	1,058
Round 7	32,220	6	5,370
Round 8	7,250	6	1,208
Round 9	37,400	6	6,233
Round 10	0	6	0
Round 11	32,500	6	5,417
Round 12	0	6	0
Round 13	0	6	0
Round 14	0	0	0
Round 15	0	0	0
Round 16	0	0	0
Round 17	0	0	0
Round 18	0	0	0
Round 19	0	0	0
Round 20	0	0	0
Round 21	0	0	0
Round 22	0	0	0
Total	177,660	60	2,961

==== By team ====
Team \ Match played	1	2	3	4	5	6	7	8	9	10	11	12	13	14	15	16	17	18	19	20	21	22	Total	Average
Barkchi Hisor	800	—N/a	120	—N/a	1,000	350	—N/a	500	—N/a		—N/a												2,770	554
CSKA Pamir	1,000	—N/a	1,300	300	—N/a	800	—N/a	700	—N/a		—N/a												4,100	820
Eskhata	—N/a	900	—N/a	—N/a	3,300	—N/a	2,500	—N/a	2,200		4,000												12,900	2,580
Istaravshan	—N/a	—N/a	5,000	—N/a	10,500	—N/a	10,000	—N/a	9,800		12,050												47,350	9,470
Istiklol	200	1,000	400	—N/a	1,000	—N/a	500	2,000	—N/a		—N/a												5,100	850
Khosilot Farkhor	—N/a	400	—N/a	1,000	—N/a	600	—N/a	1,200	—N/a		1,000												4,200	840
Hulbuk	—N/a	1,000	—N/a	700	—N/a	3,500	—N/a	2,050	—N/a		—N/a												7,250	1,813
Khujand	—N/a	550	—N/a	4,600	—N/a	—N/a	3,220	—N/a	5,000		5,000												18,370	3,674
Panjshir	800	500	—N/a	320	—N/a	600	—N/a	800	—N/a		—N/a												3,020	604
Ravshan Kulob	1,000	—N/a	800	—N/a	12,000	—N/a	13,000	—N/a	17,000		8,000												51,800	8,633
Regar-TadAZ	—N/a	—N/a	—N/a	1,300	—N/a	500	—N/a	—N/a	500		2,450												4,750	1,188
Vakhsh Bokhtar	0	—N/a	400	—N/a	750	—N/a	3,000	—N/a	2,900		—N/a												7,050	1,410
