= 2025 Tajik Super Cup =

- Event: Tajik Supercup
Istiklol	Regar-TadAZ
1	1
- Date: 25 May 2025
- Venue: Central Stadium, Hisar
- Man of the Match: Joshua Akpudje
- Referee: Gulmurodi Sadullo
- Attendance: 12,750

The 2025 Tajik Supercup was the 16th Tajik Supercup, an annual Tajik football match played between the winners of the previous season's Tajikistan Higher League and Tajikistan Cup. The match was contested by 2024 League champions Istiklol, and Cup Champions Regar-TadAZ.

== Match ==
=== Summary ===
Regar-TadAZ took the lead through a Sherzod Makhamadiev penalty in the 11th minute, before Kwadwo Frimpong was sentoff for Regar-TadAZ for violent conduct just before half time. In the second half, Joshua Akpudje equalised for Istiklol with less than 10minutes of the match remain to take the game to extra-time and then penalties, where Istiklol won 5-4.

=== Details ===
11 May 2024
19:00 (UTC+5)

Istiklol	1–1 (a.e.t.)	Regar-TadAZ
Akpudje 83'	Report	Makhamadiev 11' (pen.)
Penalties
Nazarov (penalty scored); Gafurov (penalty scored); Sulaymonov (penalty scored); Juraboev (penalty scored); Kurbonov (penalty scored)	5–4	(penalty scored) Babadjanov; (penalty scored) Ergashev; (penalty scored) Makhamadiev; (penalty scored) Temirov; (penalty missed) Imomnazarov

Central Stadium, Hisar
Attendance: 12,750
Referee: Gulmurodi Sadullo

Istiklol	Regar-TadAZ

GK	1	(Serbia)	Nikola Stošić
DF	3	(Tajikistan)	Tabrez Islomov		(substituted off) 66'
DF	5	(Tajikistan)	Sodikjon Kurbonov
DF	21	(Tajikistan)	Romish Jalilov
DF	44	(Nigeria)	Joshua Akpudje	Booked
MF	6	(Tajikistan)	Amirbek Juraboev
MF	10	(Tajikistan)	Alisher Dzhalilov
MF	11	(Tajikistan)	Mukhammadzhon Rakhimov
MF	24	(Nigeria)	Lawrence Nicholas	Booked	(substituted off) 46'
MF	77	(Iran)	Reza Dehghani		(substituted off) 81'
FW	9	(Tajikistan)	Rustam Soirov		(substituted off) 71'
Substitutes:
GK	22	(Tajikistan)	Muzaffar Safaralii
GK	99	(Tajikistan)	Mukhriddin Khasanov
FW	13	(Tajikistan)	Mukhammad Nazriev		(substituted on) 81'
FW	17	(Tajikistan)	Masrur Gafurov		(substituted on) 46'
MF	18	(Tajikistan)	Ruslan Khayloyev
DF	19	(Tajikistan)	Akhtam Nazarov		(substituted on) 66'
MF	25	(Nigeria)	Abubakar Umar
DF	33	(Nigeria)	Joseph Okoro
FW	63	(Tajikistan)	Manuchekhr Dzhalilov
DF	66	(Tajikistan)	Rustam Kamolov
MF	70	(Tajikistan)	Shahrom Sulaymonov		(substituted on) 71'
Manager:
(Tajikistan) Igor Cherevchenko

GK	33	(Cameroon)	Manuel Tresor Panny	Booked
DF	4	(Tajikistan)	Bakhtior Kalandarov		(substituted off) 62'
DF	5	(Ghana)	Osuman Kassim
DF	27	(Tajikistan)	Daler Imomnazarov
DF	44	(Cameroon)	Joseph Feumba
DF	66	(Uzbekistan)	Asilbek Temirov
MF	8	(Tajikistan)	Saidmukhtor Azimov	Booked	(substituted off) 70'
MF	11	(Tajikistan)	Faridun Davlatov		(substituted off) 70'
MF	47	(Tajikistan)	Sherzod Makhamadiev	Booked
FW	9	(Ghana)	Kwadwo Frimpong		(red card) 45+3'
FW	22	(Uzbekistan)	Samandar Kodirov		(substituted off) 56'
Substitutes:
GK	1	(Tajikistan)	Mukhammadrabi Rakhmatulloev
DF	6	(Cameroon)	David Atsam		(substituted on) 70'
MF	10	(Tajikistan)	Firuz Bobiev
MF	13	(Tajikistan)	Nozim Babadjanov		(substituted on) 62'
DF	16	(Tajikistan)	Akhatjon Rahmatov
DF	18	(Tajikistan)	Abdullo Sharipov		(substituted on) 70'
MF	20	(Tajikistan)	Ozodbek Pandzhiev
FW	62	(Tajikistan)	Jahongir Ergashev		(substituted on) 56'
FW	90	(Tajikistan)	Aminjon Ergashev
Manager:
(Tajikistan) Alisher Tukhtaev

Man of the Match:Joshua Akpudje
Assistant referees:
Hasan Karimov (Nurek)
Farkhod Kuralov (Dushanbe)
Fourth official:
Bakhtiyor Komilov (Kulyab)
VAR:
Nasrullo Kabirov (Khujand)
VAR assistant:
Khurshed Dadoboev (Dushanbe)

Match rules

- 90 minutes
- Penalty shoot-out if scores level
- Seven named substitutes
- Maximum of six substitutions

== See also ==
- 2024 Tajikistan Higher League
- 2024 Tajikistan Cup
