= Mukhammadzhon Rakhimov =

Tajikistani footballer

Personal information
- Full name: Mukhammadzhon Khasanovich Rakhimov
- Date of birth: 15 October 1998 (age 28)
- Place of birth: Kulob, Tajikistan
- Height: 1.78 m (5 ft 10 in)
- Position: Midfielder

Team information
- Current team: Istiklol
- Number: 11

Youth career
- Ravshan Kulob

Senior career*
Years	Team	Apps	(Gls)
2016	Barkchi		
2017	Khosilot Farkhor	11	(3)
2017–2021	Istiklol	66	(14)
2021	Ordabasy	7	(1)
2022–2023	Istiklol	21	(2)
2023	Nasaf	2	(0)
2023	Bukhara	10	(0)
2024	Ravshan Kulob	19	(4)
2025–	Istiklol	19	(2)

International career^{‡}
2013	Tajikistan U16		
2015–2016	Tajikistan U19	7	(0)
2016–	Tajikistan	50	(3)
- * Club domestic league appearances and goals as of 10:18, 9 March 2026 (UTC) ‡ National team caps and goals as of 07:46, 29 January 2024 (UTC)

Mukhammadzhon Khasanovich Rakhimov (Tajik: Мухаммадчон Хасанович Рахимов, Russian: Мухаммаджон Хасанович Рахимов; born 15 October 1998) is a Tajik professional footballer who plays as a midfielder for Tajikistan Higher League side Istiklol and the Tajikistan national team.

== Club career ==
=== Istiklol ===
In August 2017, Rakhimov signed for FC Istiklol.

=== Ordabasy ===
On 19 July 2021, Rakhimov left Istiklol to sign for Kazakhstan Premier League club Ordabasy. After turning down a new contract with Ordabasy, Rakhimov began training with former club Istiklol during their 2022 winter training camp in Turkey.

=== Return to Istiklol ===
On 31 March 2022, FC Istiklol announced the return of Rakhimov.

=== FC Nasaf ===
On 24 January 2023, FC Istiklol announced the departure of Rakhimov to Uzbekistan Super League club Nasaf.

=== Ravshan Kulob ===
On 4 March 2024, Ravshan Kulob announced the return of Rakhimov, on a one-year contract.

=== Second return to Istiklol ===
On 24 January 2025, Istiklol announced the return of Rakhimov.

== International career ==
Rakhimov made his international debut in a 0–0 friendly draw with Syria on 27 August 2016, replacing Nozim Babadjanov in the 70th minute.

He scored his first international goal on 7 July 2019 against India during the 2019 Intercontinental Cup at The Arena.

== Career statistics ==
=== Club ===
As of matches played 7 March 2026.

Club	Season	League			National cup (Note: Includes Tajikistan Cup, Kazakhstan Cup, Uzbekistan Cup)		Continental		Other		Total	
Club	Season	Division	Apps	Goals	Apps	Goals	Apps	Goals	Apps	Goals	Apps	Goals
Khosilot Farkhor	2017	Tajikistan Higher League	11	3	0	0	4 (Note: Appearances in AFC Cup)	1	0	0	15	4
Istiklol	2017	Tajikistan Higher League	6	0	3	1	4	0	0	0	13	1
Istiklol	2018	Tajikistan Higher League	16	2	4	0	5	0	1 (Note: Appearance in Tajik Supercup)	0	26	2
Istiklol	2019	Tajikistan Higher League	18	7	5	4	7 (Note: One appearance and one goal in AFC Champions League, six appearances in AFC Cup)	1	1	0	31	12
Istiklol	2020	Tajikistan Higher League	17	4	2	0	3 (Note: Two appearances in AFC Champions League, one appearance in AFC Cup)	0	1	1	23	5
Istiklol	2021	Tajikistan Higher League	9	1	0	0	5 (Note: Appearances in AFC Champions League)	1	1	0	15	2
Istiklol	Total		66	14	14	5	24	2	4	1	108	22
Ordabasy	2021	Kazakhstan Premier League	7	1	3	0	–		–		10	1
Istiklol	2022	Tajikistan Higher League	21	2	4	0	5	0	1	0	31	2
Nasaf	2023	Uzbekistan Super League	2	0	1	0	1	0	–		4	0
Buxoro	2023	Uzbekistan Super League	10	0	1	0	–		–		11	0
Ravshan Kulob	2024	Tajikistan Higher League	19	4			5 (Note: Appearances in AFC Champions League Two)	0	–		24	4
Istiklol	2025	Tajikistan Higher League	18	2	1	0	5	0	1	0	25	2
Istiklol	2026	Tajikistan Higher League	1	0	0	0	0	0	0	0	1	0
Total			19	2	1	0	5	0	1	0	26	2
Career total			155	26	23	5	44	3	6	1	229	35

=== International ===
Tajikistan
Year	Apps	Goals
2016	4	0
2017	1	0
2018	7	0
2019	10	1
2020	3	0
2021	8	0
2022	9	1
2023	6	1
2024	2	0
Total	50	3

Statistics accurate as of match played 28 January 2024

International goals

Scores and results list Tajikistan's goal tally first.

No.	Date	Venue	Opponent	Score	Result	Competition
1.	7 July 2019	The Arena, Ahmedabad, India	India	3–2	4–2	2019 Intercontinental Cup
2.	22 September 2022	700th Anniversary Stadium, Chiang Mai, Thailand	Trinidad and Tobago	1–1	2–1	2022 King's Cup
3.	8 September 2023	Bishan Stadium, Bishan, Singapore	Singapore	1–0	2–0	Friendly
4.	18 November 2025	Territory Rugby League Stadium, Darwin, Australia	Timor-Leste	4–0	5–0	2027 AFC Asian Cup qualification

== Honours ==
Istiklol

- Tajik League: 2017, 2018 2019, 2020, 2022, 2025
- Tajikistan Cup: 2018, 2019, 2022
- Tajik Supercup: 2018, 2019, 2020, 2021, 2022, 2025

Tajikistan

- King's Cup: 2022
- Merdeka Tournament: 2023
