= Vorse =

Vorse is a surname. Notable people with this surname include:

- Albert O. Vorse Jr. (1914-1979), American aviator
- Karl Vorse Krombein (1912–2005), American entomologist
- Mary Heaton Vorse (1874–1966), American author

== See also ==
- Morse (surname)
- Vose
