= Paul Komolafe =

Nigerian footballer (born 2000)

Personal information
- Full name: Paul Seun Komolafe
- Date of birth: 12 June 2000 (age 26)
- Place of birth: Lagos, Nigeria
- Height: 1.92 m (6 ft 4 in)
- Position: Forward

Team information
- Current team: Al-Hussein
- Number: 43

Senior career*
Years	Team	Apps	(Gls)
2019–2020	Nasarawa United	0	(0)
2020–2022	Kapfenberger SV	30	(6)
2022–2023	Qizilqum	21	(5)
2023	Arbroath	7	(0)
2024	KF Erzeni	2	(0)
2024	Chittagong Abahani	8	(4)
2025	Khujand	12	(6)
2025–2026	Istiklol	9	(6)
2026	Newroz	17	(5)
2026–	Al-Hussein	0	(0)
- * Club domestic league appearances and goals as of 1 June 2026

Paul Seun Komolafe (born 12 June 2000) is a Nigerian professional footballer who plays as a forward for Jordanian Pro League club Al-Hussein.

Starting his career in his native country of Nigeria, Komolafe went on to play in Austria, Uzbekistan, Scotland, Albania, Bangladesh, Tajikistan, Iraq, and Jordan.

== Club career ==
=== Early career ===
Paul started his professional career in the Nigeria Professional Football League where he played for Nasarawa United. In November 2019, while he was playing for Nasarawa, Paul was banned for a year in the league for assaulting the match officials and for inciting the club supporters to commit violence.

=== Kapfenberger SV ===
In February 2020, he moved to Austrian second division club Kapfenberger SV, where he received a contract running until December 2020. He made his debut for the team in the 2. Liga in June 2020, when he came on as a substitute for Paul Mensah in the 76th minute on matchday 20 of the 2019/20 season against SK Austria Klagenfurt. In two years in Kapfenberg, he made a total of 30 league appearances, in which he scored six goals. In January 2022, he left KSV.

=== FC Qizilqum ===
In February 2022, Paul moved to Uzbekistan Super League side FC Qizilqum.

=== Arbroath FC ===
On 4 February 2023, Paul signed with Scottish Championship side Arbroath FC. He made his debut for Arbroath on the same day in a league match against Raith Rovers. He went on to making seven appearances for the club, all coming on as a substitute.

The club announced his departure on 25 May 2023, after end of his contract.

=== KF Erzeni ===
On 24 December 2023, KF Erzeni from Kategoria Superiore, the Albanian top tier league, announced Paul's signing. He made two appearances for the club in the league. On 30 January 2024, Erzeni announced the termination of his contract.

=== Chittagong Abahani ===
In March 2024, Bangladesh Premier League side Chittagong Abahani announced his signing. On 29 March 2024, he made his debut for the club in a 0-1 league defeat against Bangladesh Police FC. He scored his first goal for the club on 20 April 2024 against Rahmatganj.

=== Khujand ===
On 18 February 2025, Tajikistan Higher League club Khujand announced the signing of Komolafe.

=== Istiklol ===
On 30 July 2025, Istiklol announced the signing of Komolafe from Khujand. On 29 January 2026, Istiklol announced that Komolafe had left the club after his contract was not renewed following the conclusion of the 2025 season.

=== Newroz ===
On 6 February 2026, Iraq Stars League club Newroz announced the signing of Komolafe.

== Personal life ==
Paul was born in Lagos, Nigeria. He lost his father to an accident when he was twelve. He had to earn living since then.

== Career statistics ==
As of match played 24 December 2025

Appearances and goals by club, season and competition
Club	Season	League			National Cup		League Cup		Continental		Other		Total	
Club	Season	Division	Apps	Goals	Apps	Goals	Apps	Goals	Apps	Goals	Apps	Goals	Apps	Goals
Kapfenberger SV	2019–20	2. Liga	9	1	0	0	–		–		–		9	1
Kapfenberger SV	2020–21	2. Liga	10	1	2	0	–		–		–		12	1
Kapfenberger SV	2021–22	2. Liga	11	4	2	0	–		–		–		13	4
Kapfenberger SV	Total		30	6	4	0	-	-	-	-	-	-	34	6
Qizilqum	2022	Uzbekistan Super League	22	5	0	0	–		–		–		22	5
Arbroath	2022–23	Scottish Championship	7	0	0	0	0	0	–		0 (Note: Appearances in the Scottish Challenge Cup)	0	7	0
Erzeni Shijak	2023–24	Kategoria Superiore	2	0	0	0	–		–		–		2	0
Chittagong Abahani	2024–25	Bangladesh Premier League	8	4	0	0	–		–		–		8	4
Khujand	2025	Tajikistan Higher League	12	6	0	0	–		–		–		12	6
Istiklol	2025	Tajikistan Higher League	9	6	2	0	–		6 (Note: Appearances in the AFC Champions League Two)	2	0 (Note: Appearances in the Tajik Supercup)	0	17	8
Career total			90	27	6	0	0	0	6	2	0	0	102	29

== Honours ==
Istiklol

- Tajikistan Higher League: 2025
