= Akhtam Nazarov =

Tajik footballer

Personal information
- Full name: Akhtam Mustafoevich Nazarov (Tajik: Аҳтам Назаров)
- Date of birth: 29 September 1992 (age 34)
- Place of birth: Dushanbe, Tajikistan
- Height: 1.79 m (5 ft 10 in)
- Position: Defender

Team information
- Current team: Vakhsh Bokhtar
- Number: 19

Senior career*
Years	Team	Apps	(Gls)
2012	Energetik Dushanbe		
2013–2019	Istiklol	109	(13)
2019–2020	Bashundhara Kings	6	(1)
2020–2023	Istiklol	51	(1)
2023	Andijon	5	(0)
2023–2025	Istiklol	42	(1)
2026–	Vakhsh Bokhtar	1	(0)

International career^{‡}
2011–	Tajikistan	101	(5)
- * Club domestic league appearances and goals as of 11:12, 10 March 2026 (UTC) ‡ National team caps and goals as of 07:34, 9 June 2026 (UTC)

Akhtam Nazarov (Tajik: Аҳтам Назаров; born 29 September 1992) is a Tajik professional footballer who plays as a defender for Vakhsh Bokhtar and the Tajikistan national team.

== Career ==
In November 2019, Nazarov signed for Bangladesh champions Bashundhara Kings on a one-year contract.

On 22 July 2020, Nazarov returned to FC Istiklol, signing a contract until the end of the 2021 season.

On 30 January 2023, Istiklol announced that Nazarov was leaving the club to sign for Andijon on a two-year contract. On 12 July 2023, Istiklol announced the return of Nazarov. On 12 January 2026, Istiklol announced the departure of Nazarov after his contract had expired.

On 5 March 2026, Vakhsh Bokhtar announced the signing of Nazarov.

== Career statistics ==
=== Club ===
As of match played 24 December 2025

Appearances and goals by club, season and competition
Club	Season	League			National cup		Continental		Other		Total	
Club	Season	Division	Apps	Goals	Apps	Goals	Apps	Goals	Apps	Goals	Apps	Goals
Istiklol	2013	Tajik League	16	0	2	0	–		–		18	0
Istiklol	2014	Tajik League	10	1	3	0	–		1 (Note: Appearances in the Tajik Supercup)	0	14	1
Istiklol	2015	Tajik League	14	1	6	3	10 (Note: Appearances and goals in the AFC Cup)	0	1	0	31	4
Istiklol	2016	Tajik League	16	2	7	0	5	0	0	0	28	2
Istiklol	2017	Tajik League	15	3	4	0	11	1	1	0	31	4
Istiklol	2018	Tajik League	21	2	7	2	6	2	1	0	35	6
Istiklol	2019	Tajik League	17	4	3	1	7 (Note: One appearance in the AFC Champions League, six appearances in the AFC Cup)	0	1	0	28	5
Istiklol	Total		109	13	32	6	39	3	5	0	185	22
Bashundhara Kings	2019–20	Bangladesh Premier League	6	1	0	0	0	0	–		6	1
Istiklol	2020	Tajikistan Higher League	9	0	2	0	0	0 (Note: Zero appearances in the AFC Champions League, Zero appearances in the AFC Cup)	0	0	11	0
Istiklol	2021	Tajikistan Higher League	20	1	3	0	6 (Note: Appearances in the AFC Champions League)	0	1	0	30	1
Istiklol	2022	Tajikistan Higher League	22	0	3	0	2	0	1	0	28	0
Istiklol	Total		51	1	8	0	8	0	2	0	69	1
Andijon	2023	Uzbekistan Super League	5	0	1	0	–				6	0
Istiklol	2023	Tajikistan Higher League	9	0	4	0	2	0	0	0	15	0
Istiklol	2024	Tajikistan Higher League	15	0	4	0	5 (Note: Appearances in the AFC Champions League Two)	0	1	0	25	0
Istiklol	2025	Tajikistan Higher League	18	1	2	0	1	0	1	0	22	1
Istiklol	Total		42	1	10	0	8	0	2	0	62	1
Career total			213	16	51	6	55	3	9	0	328	25

=== International ===
As of match played 18 November 2025

Appearances and goals by national team and year
National team	Year	Apps	Goals
Tajikistan	2011	1	0
Tajikistan	2012	2	0
Tajikistan	2013	4	0
Tajikistan	2014	4	0
Tajikistan	2015	7	2
Tajikistan	2016	8	1
Tajikistan	2017	6	0
Tajikistan	2018	8	2
Tajikistan	2019	12	0
Tajikistan	2020	3	0
Tajikistan	2021	6	0
Tajikistan	2022	9	0
Tajikistan	2023	6	0
Tajikistan	2024	14	0
Tajikistan	2025	8	0
Total		98	5

International goals by date, venue, cap, opponent, score, result and competition
No.	Date	Venue	Cap	Opponent	Score	Result	Competition
1	8 October 2015	Spartak Stadium, Bishkek, Kyrgyzstan	16	Kyrgyzstan	2–1	2–2	2018 FIFA World Cup qualification
2	12 November 2015	Pamir Stadium, Dushanbe, Tajikistan	18	Bangladesh	3–0	5–0	2018 FIFA World Cup qualification
3	7 June 2016	Bangabandhu National Stadium, Dhaka, Bangladesh	21	Bangladesh	1–0	1–0	2019 AFC Asian Cup qualification
4	27 March 2018	Rizal Memorial Stadium, Manila, Philippines	33	Philippines	1–0	1–2	2019 AFC Asian Cup qualification
5	9 October 2018	Cox's Bazar Stadium, Cox's Bazar, Bangladesh	36	Philippines	2–0	2-0	2018 Bangabandhu Cup

== Honours ==
Istiklol

- Tajik League: 2014, 2015, 2016, 2017, 2018 2019, 2020, 2021, 2022, 2023, 2024 2025
- Tajik Cup: 2013, 2014, 2015, 2016, 2018, 2023
- Tajik Supercup: 2014, 2015, 2018, 2019, 2021, 2022, 2024 2025

Tajikistan

- King's Cup: 2022
