= Rudolf Turkaj =

Albanian footballer

Personal information
- Date of birth: 3 February 1995 (age 31)
- Place of birth: Lezhë, Albania
- Height: 1.87 m (6 ft 2 in)
- Position: Centre-back

Team information
- Current team: Vëllaznimi
- Number: 95

Youth career
- 2011–2014: Shkëndija Tiranë

Senior career*
Years	Team	Apps	(Gls)
2014–2016	Besëlidhja	11	(0)
2016–2017	Shënkolli	21	(0)
2017–2019	Iliria	42	(6)
2019–2023	Laçi	97	(4)
2023–2024	Martigues	3	(0)
2024–2025	Suhareka	17	(0)
2025	Istiklol	7	(1)
2026	Ferizaj	7	(0)
2026	Trepça	1	(0)
2026–	Vëllaznimi	0	(0)

International career^{‡}
2022–	Albania	2	(0)
- * Club domestic league appearances and goals as of 22 June 2026 ‡ National team caps and goals as of 28 April 2023

Rudolf Turkaj (born 3 February 1995) is an Albanian professional footballer who plays as a centre-back, for Vëllaznimi.

== Career ==
On 29 July 2025, Turkaj signed for Tajikistan Higher League club Istiklol, on a contract until the end of 2025. On 10 January 2026, Istiklol announced that they had not renewed their contract with Turkaj after he'd played nine games for the club and scored once.

On 18 January 2026, Kosovo Superleague club Ferizaj announced the signing of Turkaj.

On 9 July 2026, Turkaj signed for Trepça. He left the club after one game and signed for Vëllaznimi.

== Honors ==
Istiklol

- Tajikistan Higher League :2025

== Career statistics ==
As of match played 24 December 2025

Appearances and goals by club, season and competition
Club	Season	League			National Cup		League Cup		Continental		Other		Total	
Club	Season	Division	Apps	Goals	Apps	Goals	Apps	Goals	Apps	Goals	Apps	Goals	Apps	Goals
Istiklol	2025	Tajikistan Higher League	7	1	0	0	–		2 (Note: Appearances in the AFC Champions League Two)	0	0 (Note: Appearances in the Tajik Supercup)	0	9	1
Career total			7	1	0	0	-	-	2	0	0	0	9	1
