= Oleksiy Helovani =

Ukrainian footballer

Personal information
- Full name: Oleksiy Hiyovych Helovani
- Date of birth: 20 February 1998 (age 28)
- Place of birth: Donetsk, Ukraine
- Height: 1.80 m (5 ft 11 in)
- Position: Defensive midfielder

Team information
- Current team: Karaiskakis
- Number: 28

Youth career
- 2011–2012: Metalurh Donetsk
- 2013–2014: Olimpik-UOR Donetsk

Senior career*
Years	Team	Apps	(Gls)
2015–2019	Olimpik Donetsk	0	(0)
2019–2020	Valmiera	18	(0)
2020	Kremin Kremenchuk	16	(1)
2021	Epitsentr Dunaivtsi	8	(0)
2021	Kramatorsk	11	(0)
2022–	Karaiskakis	1	(0)
- * Club domestic league appearances and goals as of 5 March 2022

Oleksiy Hiyovych Helovani (Ukrainian: Олексій Гійович Геловані; born 20 February 1998) is a Ukrainian professional footballer who plays as a defensive midfielder for Greek club Karaiskakis.
