= Kirill Suslov =

Russian footballer

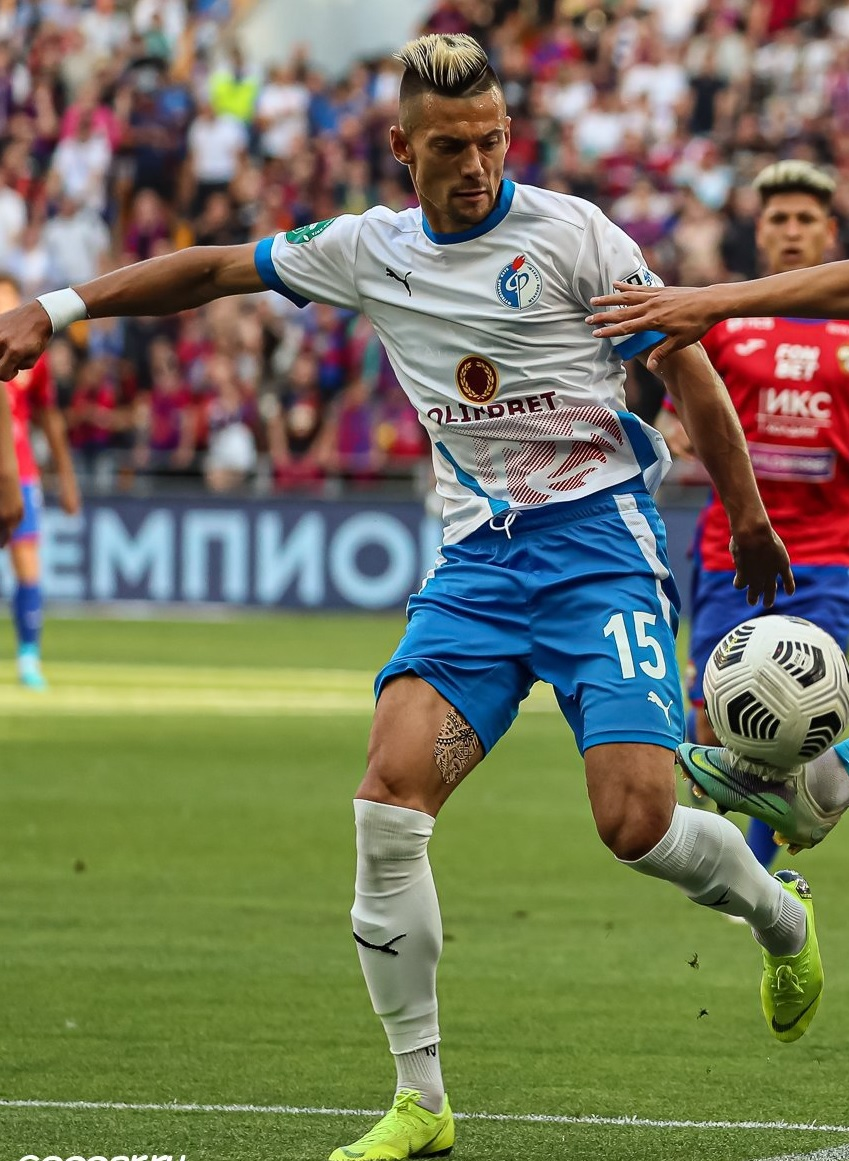
- Suslov with Fakel in 2022

Personal information
- Full name: Kirill Pavlovich Suslov
- Date of birth: 26 October 1991 (age 35)
- Place of birth: Vysokovsk, Russian SFSR, Soviet Union
- Height: 1.87 m (6 ft 2 in)
- Position: Centre-back

Youth career
- Prialit Reutov
- CSKA Moscow

Senior career*
Years	Team	Apps	(Gls)
2011–2012	Dynamo Barnaul	18	(0)
2012–2014	Spartak Nalchik	21	(0)
2014–2015	Sokol Saratov	13	(1)
2015	KAMAZ	14	(0)
2016–2017	Kongsvinger	34	(3)
2018	Amkar Perm	0	(0)
2018	Luch Vladivostok	21	(2)
2019–2021	SKA-Khabarovsk	64	(1)
2021–2024	Fakel Voronezh	53	(1)
2024–2025	Sochi	15	(0)
2025–2026	Istiklol	7	(0)
2026	Chernomorets Novorossiysk	12	(0)
- * Club domestic league appearances and goals as of 27 August 2026

Kirill Pavlovich Suslov (Russian: Кирилл Павлович Суслов; born 26 October 1991) is a Russian former professional footballer who played as a centre-back.

== Club career ==
He made his debut in the Russian Second Division for Dynamo Barnaul on 23 April 2011 in a game against Sakhalin Yuzhno-Sakhalinsk.

He made his Russian Football National League debut for Spartak Nalchik on 29 April 2013 in a game against Tom Tomsk.

On 8 February 2018, Suslov signed a 3-year contract with Amkar Perm. He made his only competitive appearance for Amkar on 20 May 2018 in a relegation playoff game against Tambov. That was Amkar's last game as they went bankrupt shortly after.

Suslov made his Russian Premier League debut for Fakel Voronezh on 17 July 2022 against Krasnodar.

On 16 June 2023, Suslov extended his contract with Fakel.

On 28 May 2024, Suslov left Fakel as his contract expired.

On 21 July 2025, Suslov joined Istiklol in Tajikistan on a one-season contract. On 13 February 2026, Istiklol announced that they had mutually agreed with Suslov to terminate his contract.

On 19 February 2026, Russian First League club Chernomorets Novorossiysk announced the signing of Suslov on a contract until the end of the season.

=== Career statistics ===
As of match played 16 May 2026

Club	Season	League			Cup		Continental		Other		Total	
Club	Season	Division	Apps	Goals	Apps	Goals	Apps	Goals	Apps	Goals	Apps	Goals
Dynamo Barnaul	2011–12	Russian Second League	18	0	1	0	–		–		19	0
Spartak Nalchik	2012–13	Russian First League	4	0	0	0	–		1 (Note: Appearance in promotion play-offs)	0	5	0
Spartak Nalchik	2013–14	Russian First League	17	0	1	0	–		–		18	0
Spartak Nalchik	Total		21	0	1	0	0	0	1	0	23	0
Sokol Saratov	2014–15	Russian First League	13	1	0	0	–		5 (Note: Appearances in FNL Cup)	0	18	1
KAMAZ Naberezhnye Chelny	2015–16	Russian First League	14	0	0	0	–		–		14	0
Kongsvinger	2016	Norwegian First Division	25	2	7	0	–		2	0	34	2
Kongsvinger	2017	Norwegian First Division	9	1	0	0	–		–		9	1
Kongsvinger	Total		34	3	7	0	0	0	2	0	43	3
Amkar Perm	2017–18	Russian Premier League	0	0	0	0	–		1 (Note: Appearance in relegation play-offs)	0	1	0
Luch Vladivostok	2018–19	Russian First League	21	2	1	0	–		–		22	2
SKA-Khabarovsk	2018–19	Russian First League	12	1	–		–		–		12	1
SKA-Khabarovsk	2019–20	Russian First League	18	0	2	0	–		–		20	0
SKA-Khabarovsk	2020–21	Russian First League	34	0	3	0	–		–		37	0
SKA-Khabarovsk	Total		64	1	5	0	0	0	0	0	69	1
Fakel Voronezh	2021–22	Russian First League	19	1	2	0	–		–		21	1
Fakel Voronezh	2022–23	Russian Premier League	23	0	1	0	–		2	0	26	0
Fakel Voronezh	2023–24	Russian Premier League	11	0	6	0	–		–		17	0
Fakel Voronezh	Total		53	1	9	0	0	0	2	0	64	1
Sochi	2024–25	Russian First League	15	0	2	0	–		1	0	18	0
Istiklol	2025	Tajikistan Higher League	7	0	1	0	3 (Note: Appearances in the AFC Champions League Two)	0	–		11	0
Chernomorets	2025–26	Russian First League	10	0	–		–		–		10	0
Career total			270	8	27	0	3	0	12	0	312	8
