= FC Hulbuk =

Football club from Tajikistan

Hulbuk Vose
- Full name: Hulbuk Vose Football Club (Клуби футболи «Ҳулбук» Восеъ)
- Founded: 1992
- Ground: Central Stadium, Hulbuk
- Capacity: 1,000-1,500
- League: Tajikistan First League
- 2026: 1st of 16
Home colours	Away colours

Football Club Hulbuk Vose (Tajik: Клуби футболи «Ҳулбук» Восеъ) is a Tajikistani professional football club based in the city of Hulbuk (formerly known as Vose), located in the southern part of the country. The club competes in the Tajikistan Higher League, the top tier of Tajik football, following promotion from the 2024 Tajikistan First League as league champions.

== History ==
Chronology of Club Names
Year	Name	Notes
1993	Hulbuk Vose	Russian: «Хулбук» Восе
1997	Randzhbar Vose	Russian: «Ранджбар» Восе
2000	Club dissolved	The club ceased operations.
2005	Hulbuk Vose	Russian: «Хулбук» Восе

The football club Hulbuk was founded in the town of Vose in 1992. In the same year, the team debuted in the Tajik Higher League. During their inaugural season, they finished in 12th place.

In 1997, the club changed its name to Randzhbar Vose and won silver medals in the national championship. However, at the end of the 1999 season, the club was dissolved. It was reactivated in 2005 under its historical name, Hulbuk Vose, and later participated in the First League.

At 30 November 2024 the football club Hulbuk from Vose District has won the Tajikistan First League 2024 and earned the right to compete in the Tajikistan Higher League in 2025.

At 14 November 2026 the FC Hulbuk under the leadership of coach Makhmadjon Khabibulloev has won the Tajikistan First League 2026 and earned the right to compete in the Tajikistan Higher League in 2027.

== Current squad ==
As of 6 March 2025

Note: Flags indicate national team as defined under FIFA eligibility rules; some limited exceptions apply. Players may hold more than one non-FIFA nationality.

No.	Pos.	Nation	Player
1	GK	GHA	Prosper Gbeku
3	DF	TJK	Alisher Kholmurodov
4	DF	TJK	Khaydar Sattorov (on loan from Istiklol)
5	DF	TJK	Daler Shomurodov
6	DF	IRI	Vafa Hakhamaneshi
7	MF	TJK	Jamshed Murodov
9	FW	IRI	Aahkan Pajoukhan
10	MF	TJK	Masur Kiamudinov
11	FW	TJK	Khayriddin Turakhonov
14	MF	TJK	Hasan Rustamov
15	DF	CMR	Franklin Bamayangona
17	MF	TJK	Zainuloh Mizoabdulloyev
18	DF	TJK	Alisher Salimov

No.	Pos.	Nation	Player
19	FW	TJK	Zarhalshah Akramov
20	FW	TJK	Maksud Odinaev
21	FW	IRI	Farzin Moradi
22	GK	TJK	Shahin Jalilov
23	DF	TJK	Zafar Berdiev
25	FW	TJK	Bakhruman Azimov
27	MF	TJK	Bakhtiyor Choriyev
55	MF	TJK	Pahlavan Bahrizoda
62	MF	TJK	Safarali Karimov
71	DF	TJK	Alisher Khudaykulov
77	MF	TJK	Yunus Ismatulloev
88	MF	UZB	Zafar Ismailov

== Achievements ==
=== Domestic Titles ===
Tajikistan

Competition	Titles	Year(s)
Tajik League	0	–
Runners-up	1	1997
Tajik Cup Winners	0	–
Tajik Cup Finalists	1	1997/98
First League Championships	2	2024, 2026

== Stadium ==
The club plays its home matches at the Central Stadium in Vose, which has a capacity of 1,000 spectators.

== Links ==
- FC Hulbuk at GSA
