= Artyom Serdyuk =

Russian footballer

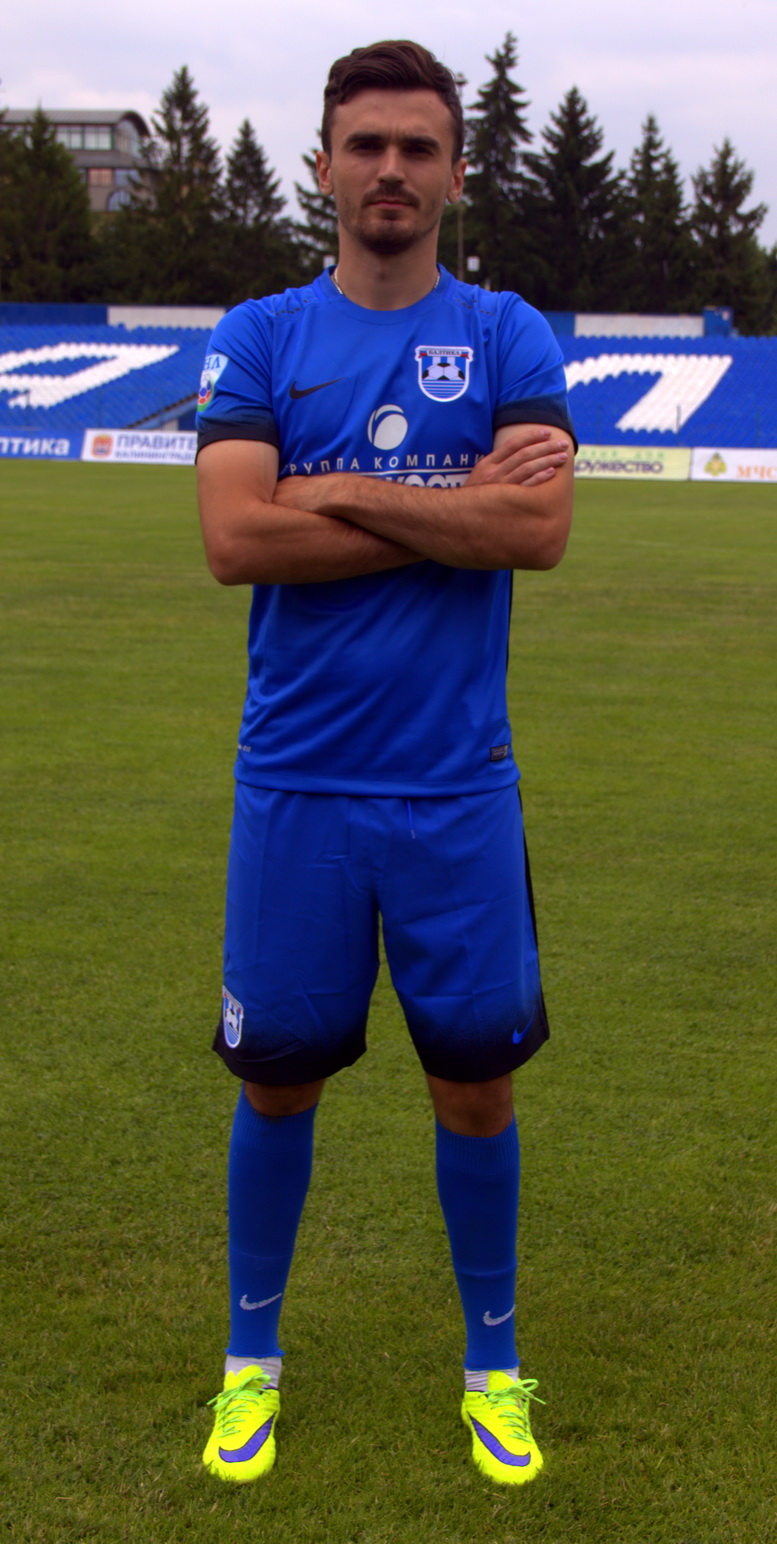
- Serdyuk with Baltika Kaliningrad in 2016

Personal information
- Full name: Artyom Sergeyevich Serdyuk
- Date of birth: 22 January 1990 (age 36)
- Place of birth: Salsk, Rostov Oblast, Russian SFSR
- Height: 1.85 m (6 ft 1 in)
- Position: Striker

Youth career
- 2007–2008: Rostov

Senior career*
Years	Team	Apps	(Gls)
2009–2010	Rostov	0	(0)
2009	→ Taganrog (loan)	26	(6)
2011–2012	MITOS Novocherkassk	44	(5)
2013–2014	Olimpia Volgograd	33	(9)
2014–2015	Torpedo Armavir	22	(8)
2015–2017	Baltika Kaliningrad	61	(11)
2017–2018	Fakel Voronezh	31	(4)
2018	Chayka Peschanokopskoye	5	(1)
2019	Volga Ulyanovsk	9	(3)
2019–2020	Slutsk	36	(9)
2021–2022	Khujand	25	(11)
2022	Al-Ahli	19	(5)
2023	Al-Riffa	6	(1)
2023	Muras United	12	(4)
2024	Khujand	19	(10)
2025	Dejan	6	(4)
2025	Khujand	8	(1)
- * Club domestic league appearances and goals as of 26 January 2026

Artyom Sergeyevich Serdyuk (Russian: Артём Серге́евич Сердюк; born 22 January 1990) is a Russian former professional football.

== Club career ==
He made his Russian Football National League debut for FC Baltika Kaliningrad on 11 July 2015 in a game against FC Shinnik Yaroslavl.

On 2 March 2025, Tajikistan Higher League club Khujand announced that Serdyuk had extended his contract with the club for the 2025 season.
