= Lawrence Nicholas =

Nigerian footballer

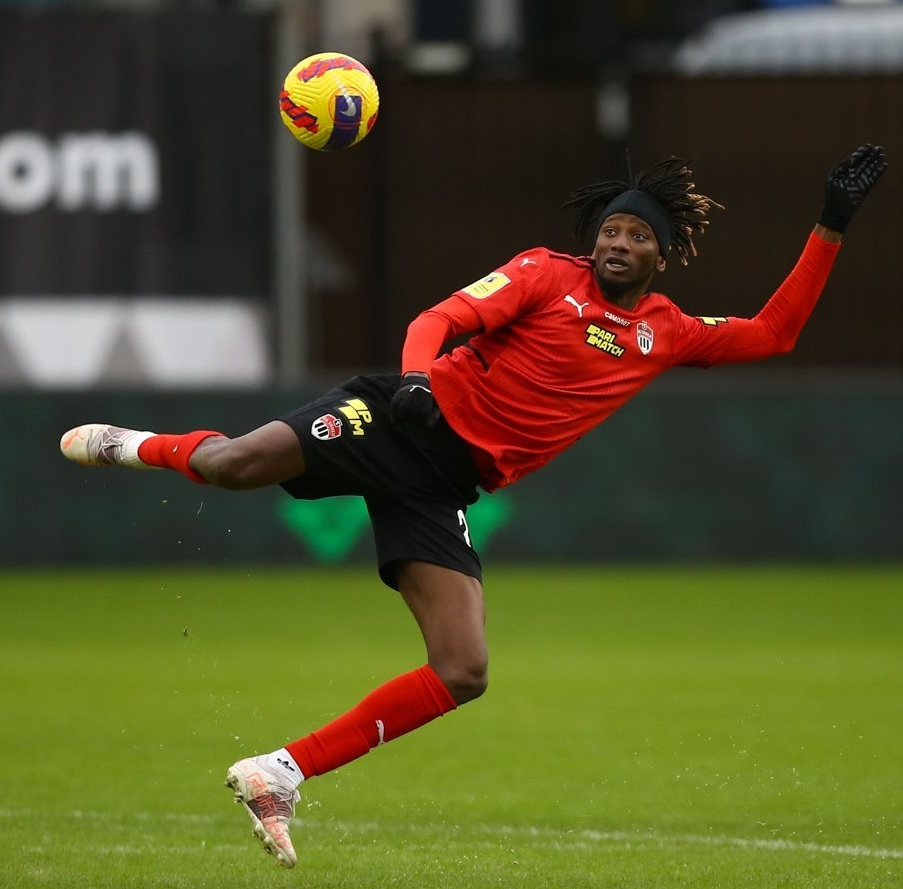
- Nicholas with Khimki in 2022

Personal information
- Full name: Lawrence Anwan Nicholas
- Date of birth: 17 May 2001 (age 25)
- Height: 1.88 m (6 ft 2 in)
- Position: Midfielder

Team information
- Current team: Al-Afreeki

Youth career
- Haruna Babangida Academy

Senior career*
| Years | Team | Apps | (Gls) |
| 2019–2021 | Tambov | 2 | (0) |
| 2021 | Olimp-Dolgoprudny | 22 | (0) |
| 2022 | Khimki | 4 | (0) |
| 2022–2024 | Fatih Karagümrük | 22 | (0) |
| 2025 | Istiklol | 9 | (1) |
| 2025– | Al-Afreeki | 10 | (1) |
- * Club domestic league appearances and goals as of 22 April 2026

Lawrence Anwan Nicholas (born 17 May 2001) is a Nigerian footballer who plays as a midfielder, for Libyan Premier League club Al-Afreeki.

== Club career ==
Nicholas made his debut in the Russian Premier League for Tambov on 5 December 2020 in a game against Spartak Moscow, coming on for Dmitri Merenchukov in the 85th minute. On 13 December 2020 he made his first start for Tambov in a game against Rubin Kazan.

On 18 February 2022, Nicholas signed a contract with Russian Premier League side FC Khimki until the end of the 2023–24 season. On 21 July 2022, his contract with Khimki was terminated by mutual consent.

On 30 July 2022, he signed with Fatih Karagümrük in Turkey.

On 16 February 2025, Tajikistan Higher League club Istiklol announced the signing of Nicholas to a one-year contract. On 16 July 2025, Istiklol announced the departure of Nicholas.

On 5 October 2025, Libyan Premier League club Al-Afreeki announced the signing of Nicholas.

== Personal life ==
Nicholas is registered as his last name by the Russian Premier League and he is listed under that last name on the official site of FC Tambov. However, other sources list "Anwan" as his last name (with the full name Nicholas Lawrence Anwan) or "Lawrence" as his last name (with the full name Anwan Nicholas Lawrence).

== Career statistics ==
As of match played 17 May 2025

| Club | Season | League | | | Cup | | Continental | | Other | | Total | |
| Club | Season | Division | Apps | Goals | Apps | Goals | Apps | Goals | Apps | Goals | Apps | Goals |
|---|---|---|---|---|---|---|---|---|---|---|---|---|
| Tambov | 2020–21 | RPL | 2 | 0 | 1 | 0 | – | | – | | 3 | 0 |
| Olimp-Dolgoprudny | 2021–22 | FNL | 22 | 0 | 1 | 0 | – | | – | | 23 | 0 |
| Khimki | 2021–22 | RPL | 4 | 0 | – | | – | | – | | 4 | 0 |
| Fatih Karagümrük | 2022–23 | Süper Lig | 19 | 0 | 2 | 0 | – | | – | | 21 | 0 |
| Fatih Karagümrük | 2023–24 | Süper Lig | 3 | 0 | 2 | 0 | – | | – | | 5 | 0 |
| Fatih Karagümrük | Total | | 22 | 0 | 4 | 0 | 0 | 0 | 0 | 0 | 26 | 0 |
| Istiklol | 2025 | Tajikistan Higher League | 9 | 1 | 0 | 0 | 0 (Note: Appearances and goals in the AFC Champions League Two) | 0 | 1 (Note: Appearances and goals in the Tajik Supercup) | 0 | 10 | 1 |
| Career total | | | 37 | 1 | 2 | 0 | 0 | 0 | 1 | 0 | 40 | 1 |
