= Ruslan Khayloyev =

Tajikistani footballer (born 2003)

Personal information
- Full name: Ruslan Dilovarshoyevich Khayloyev
- Date of birth: 29 October 2003 (age 23)
- Place of birth: Tver, Russia
- Height: 1.81 m (5 ft 11 in)
- Position: Midfielder

Team information
- Current team: Ravshan Kulob

Youth career
- 2009–2019: Tver
- 2019–2021: Zenit

Senior career*
Years	Team	Apps	(Gls)
2021–2023	Zenit-2	32	(4)
2023–2024	Tyumen	1	(0)
2024–2025	Istiklol	10	(0)
2025	Lotus Music		
2026–	Ravshan Kulob		

International career^{‡}
2023	Tajikistan U23	2	(1)
2023–	Tajikistan	4	(0)
- * Club domestic league appearances and goals as of 16 July 2025 ‡ National team caps and goals as of 21 November 2024

Ruslan Dilovarshoyevich Khayloyev (Tajik: Руслан Диловаршоевич Хайлоев, Russian: Руслан Диловаршоевич Хайлоев; born 29 October 2003) is a professional footballer who plays as a midfielder, for Ravshan Kulob. Born in Russia, he plays for the Tajikistan national team.

== Club career ==
Khayloyev began playing football with Tver at the age of 6, and moved to the youth academy of Zenit in 2019. On 14 January 2021, he signed his first professional contract with Zenit. In 2021, he debuted with Zenit-2 in the Russian Second League. In September 2023, he terminated his contract with Zenit-2 in order to represent Tajikistan internationally, as foreign players were not allowed to play in the division. He shortly after signed with Tyumen.

On 1 August 2024, Tajikistan Higher League club Istiklol announced the signing of Khayloyev to a one-year contract. On 16 July 2025, Istiklol announced the departure of Khayloyev.

On 22 September 2025, Lotus Music of the Media Football League announced the signing of Khayloyev.

On 2 February 2026, Tajikistan Higher League club Ravshan Kulob announced the signing of Khayloyev.

== International career ==
Born in Russia, Khayloyev is of Tajik descent through his father. He debuted with the senior Tajikistan national team in a friendly 2–0 win over Malaysia on 17 October 2023.

== Career statistics ==
=== Club ===
As of match played 3 May 2025

Club	Season	League			National Cup		League Cup		Continental		Other		Total	
Club	Season	Division	Apps	Goals	Apps	Goals	Apps	Goals	Apps	Goals	Apps	Goals	Apps	Goals
Zenit-2 St.Petersburg	2021–22	Russian Second League	3	0	-		-		-		-		3	0
Zenit-2 St.Petersburg	2022–23	Russian Second League	24	3	-		-		-		-		24	3
Zenit-2 St.Petersburg	2023	Russian Second League	5	1	-		-		-		-		5	1
Zenit-2 St.Petersburg	Total		32	4	-	-	-	-	-	-	-	-	32	4
Tyumen	2023–24	Russian First League	1	0	0	0	-		-		-		1	0
Istiklol	2024	Tajikistan Higher League	8	0	4	0	-		0 (Note: Appearances and goals in the AFC Champions League Two)	0	0 (Note: Appearances and goals in the Tajik Supercup)	0	12	0
Istiklol	2025	Tajikistan Higher League	2	0	0	0	-		0	0	0	0	2	0
Istiklol	Total		10	0	4	0	-	-	0	0	0	0	14	4
Career total			43	4	4	0	0	0	0	0	0	0	47	4

=== International ===
As of match played 22 January 2024

National team	Year	Apps	Goals
Tajikistan	2023	2	0
Tajikistan	2024	2	0
Total		4	0
