= Sodikdzhon Kurbonov =

Tajikistani professional football player

Personal information
- Full name: Sodikdzhon Amirkhudzhayevich Kurbonov
- Date of birth: 19 January 2003 (age 23)
- Place of birth: Istaravshan, Tajikistan
- Height: 1.83 m (6 ft 0 in)
- Position: Defender

Team information
- Current team: Istiklol
- Number: 5

Senior career*
Years	Team	Apps	(Gls)
2020–2021	Barkchi		
2022–2023	Dynamo Dushanbe		
2023–	Istiklol	42	(3)

International career^{‡}
2023–	Tajikistan	10	(0)
- * Club domestic league appearances and goals as of 08:41, 23 April 2026 (UTC) ‡ National team caps and goals as of 18 November 2025

Sodikdzhon Amirkhudzhayevich Kurbonov (Tajik: Содикчон Амирхучаевич Курбонов, Russian: Содикджон Амирхуджаевич Курбонов; born 19 January 2003) is a Tajikistani professional football player for Istiklol and the Tajikistan national team.

== Career ==
=== Club ===
On 20 February 2023, Kurbonov signed for Istiklol on a two-year contract from Dynamo Dushanbe.

== Career statistics ==
=== Club ===
As of match played 19 April 2026

Appearances and goals by club, season and competition
Club	Season	League			National Cup		League Cup		Continental		Other		Total	
Club	Season	Division	Apps	Goals	Apps	Goals	Apps	Goals	Apps	Goals	Apps	Goals	Apps	Goals
Istiklol	2023	Tajikistan Higher League	13	2	5	1	–		6 (Note: Appearances in the AFC Champions League)	0	1 (Note: Appearances in the Tajik Supercup)	0	25	3
Istiklol	2024	Tajikistan Higher League	13	0	4	0	–		6 (Note: Appearances in the AFC Champions League Two)	0	1	0	24	0
Istiklol	2025	Tajikistan Higher League	15	1	1	0	–		5	0	1	0	22	1
Istiklol	2026	Tajikistan Higher League	1	0	0	0	–		0 (Note: Appearances in the AFC Challenge League)	0	0	0	1	0
Istiklol	Total		42	3	10	1	-	-	17	0	3	0	72	4
Career total			42	3	10	1	-	-	17	0	3	0	72	4

=== International ===
As of match played 19 November 2024

National team	Year	Apps	Goals
Tajikistan	2023	2	0
Tajikistan	2024	3	0
Total		5	0

== Honours ==
Istiklol

- Tajik League: 2023
- Tajik Cup: 2023
- Tajik Supercup: 2024
