= Igor Cherevchenko =

Tajik footballer (born 1974)

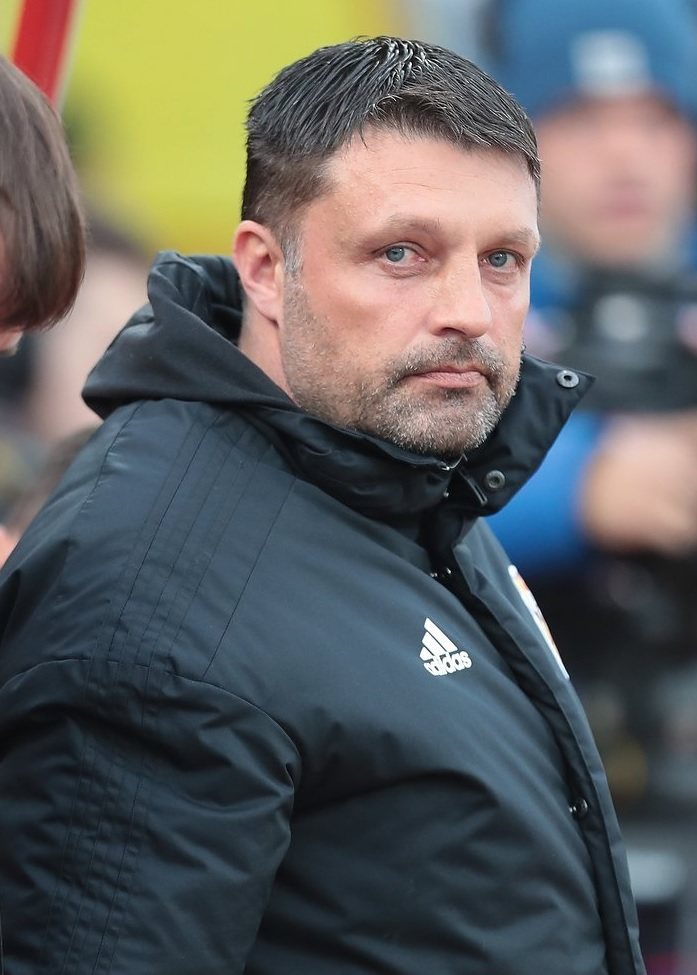
- Cherevchenko coaching Arsenal Tula in 2019

Personal information
- Full name: Igor Gennadyevich Cherevchenko
- Date of birth: 21 August 1974 (age 52)
- Place of birth: Dushanbe, Tajik SSR, Soviet Union
- Height: 1.88 m (6 ft 2 in)
- Position: Defender

Senior career*
Years	Team	Apps	(Gls)
1992–1995	Pamir Dushanbe		
1995–1996	Industriya Borovsk	36	(4)
1996–2001	Lokomotiv Moscow	123	(5)
2002	Torpedo Moscow	12	(0)
2002	Alania Vladikavkaz	5	(0)

International career
1993–1994	Tajikistan	8	(0)

Managerial career
- 2008–2015: Lokomotiv Moscow (assistant)
- 2014: Lokomotiv Moscow (caretaker)
- 2015: Lokomotiv Moscow (caretaker)
- 2015–2016: Lokomotiv Moscow
- 2017–2018: Baltika Kaliningrad
- 2018–2020: Arsenal Tula
- 2020–2021: Khimki
- 2021–2022: Khimki
- 2023–2024: Istiklol
- 2024: Fakel Voronezh
- 2024–2025: Istiklol
- * Club domestic league appearances and goals

Igor Gennadyevich Cherevchenko (Russian: И́горь Генна́дьевич Чере́вченко, IPA: [ˈiɡərʲ ɡʲɪˈnadʲjɪvʲɪtɕ tɕɪˈrʲeftɕɪnkə]; born 21 August 1974) is a Tajik football manager and former player who was most recently the manager of Istiklol.

== Coaching career ==
Cherevchenko signed a contract with Russian Premier League club FC Arsenal Tula on 13 November 2018. He led Arsenal to the UEFA Europa League qualification for the first time in club's history at the end of the 2018–19 season.

He resigned from Arsenal on 1 July 2020 following five consecutive league losses.

On 25 September 2020, he was hired by Russian Premier League club FC Khimki. He left Khimki by mutual consent on 25 October 2021. On 19 November 2021, he was re-hired by Khimki. On 22 February 2022, he left Khimki by mutual consent once again.

On 18 January 2023, Cherevchenko was appointed as the new head coach of Tajikistan champions Istiklol on a one-year contract. On 1 November 2023, Cherevchenko won his first trophy as Istiklol head coach, defeating Ravshan Kulob 4–2 on penalties in the 2023 Tajikistan Cup Final after an initial 1-1 draw. A month later, on 1 December 2023, Istiklol defeated Kuktosh Rudaki 4–1 to secure their 10th league title in a row, and 12th overall. On 11 February 2024, Istiklol announced that Cherevchenko and his coaching staff had all left the club after their contracts had expired.

On 26 April 2024, Cherevchenko was hired by the Russian Premier League club Fakel Voronezh. Cherevechenko left Fakel by mutual consent on 12 August 2024, with the club in last place in the table.

On 4 October 2024, Istiklol announced the return of Cherevchenko as their head coach. On 1 November 2024, Istiklol were crowned Champions of Tajikistan for the thirteenth time, and the second time Cherevchenko lifted the trophy. At the start of the 2025 season, Cherevchenko guided Istiklol to their thirteenth Tajik Supercup title after they defeated Regar-TadAZ 5–4 on penalties. On 8 December 2025, Istiklol secured their 14th Tajikistan title after a 1-1 draw with Vakhsh Bokhtar, and qualified for the 2026–27 AFC Challenge League in the process. On 29 December 2025, Istiklol announced that the contracts of Cherevchenko and his coaching staff had expired and that they had left the club.

== Career statistics ==
Tajikistan
Year	Apps	Goals
1993	4	0
1994	4	0
Total	8	0

Statistics accurate as of 12 November 2014.

== Honours ==
=== Player ===
Pamir Dushanbe

- Tajik League: 1992
- Tajik Cup: 1992

Lokomotiv Moscow

- Russian Cup: 1996, 1997, 2000, 2001.

=== Manager ===
Lokomotiv Moscow

- Russian Cup: 2014–15

Istiklol

- Tajikistan Higher League: 2023, 2024, 2025
- Tajikistan Cup: 2023
- Tajik Supercup: 2025
