= Joseph Okoro =

Nigerian footballer

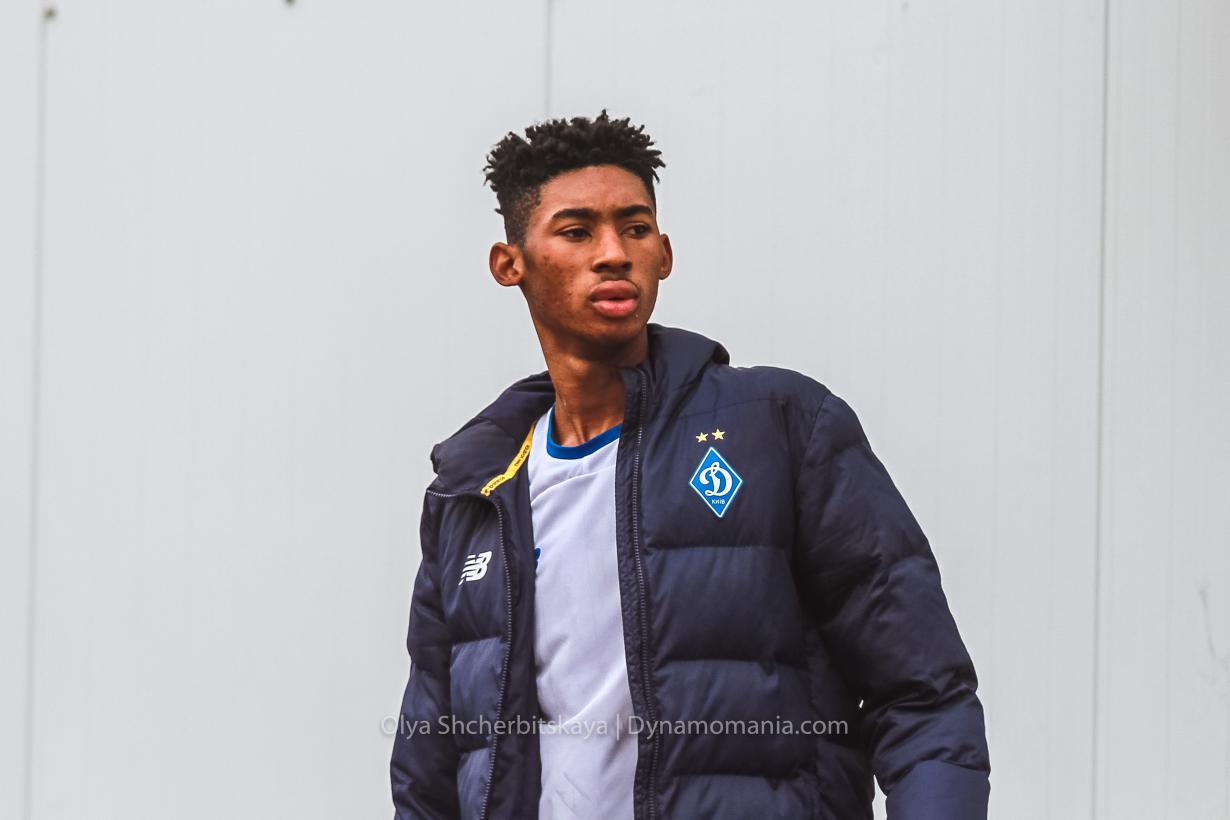

Personal information
- Date of birth: 17 February 2001 (age 25)
- Height: 1.89 m (6 ft 2 in)
- Position: Midfielder

Team information
- Current team: Churchill Brothers
- Number: 3

Youth career
- 2019–2020: Dynamo Kyiv

Senior career*
Years	Team	Apps	(Gls)
2021	Gomel	0	(0)
2021–2022	Olimp-Dolgoprudny	2	(0)
2023	Istiklol	20	(0)
2024	Bnei Yehuda	1	(0)
2024	Dinamo Minsk	3	(0)
2025	Istiklol	14	(0)
2026	Serikspor	3	(0)
2026–	Churchill Brothers	2	(0)
- * Club domestic league appearances and goals as of 5 November 2026

Joseph Okoro (born 17 February 2001) is a Nigerian professional footballer who plays as a midfielder, for Indian Super League club Churchill Brothers.

== Club career ==
Okoro played for FC Dynamo Kyiv in the 2019–20 UEFA Youth League.

Okoro made his debut in the Russian Football National League for FC Olimp-Dolgoprudny on 8 August 2021 in a game against FC Torpedo Moscow.

=== Istiklol ===
In March 2023, Okoro was announced as a member of Istiklol's squad for the 2023 season. On 21 December 2023, Istiklol announced the departure of Okoro after his contract had expired.

=== Dinamo Minsk ===
On 3 September 2024, Dinamo Minsk announced the signing of Okoro.

=== Istiklol return ===
On 23 January 2025, Istiklol announced the return of Okoro to the club on a one-year contract. On 8 January 2026, Istiklol announced that Okoro had left the club after his contract wasn't renewed at the end of the previous season.

=== Serikspor ===
On 8 January 2026, TFF 1. Lig club Serikspor announced the signing of Okoro on a contract until the summer of 2027.

=== Churchill Brothers ===
On 25 October 2026, Indian Super League club Churchill Brothers announced the signing of Okoro.

== Career statistics ==
As of match played 5 November 2026

Appearances and goals by club, season and competition
Club	Season	League			National Cup		League Cup		Continental		Other		Total	
Club	Season	Division	Apps	Goals	Apps	Goals	Apps	Goals	Apps	Goals	Apps	Goals	Apps	Goals
Gomel	2021	Belarusian Premier League	0	0	0	0	–						0	0
Olimp-Dolgoprudny	2021–22	Russian First League	2	0	1	0	–						3	0
Istiklol	2023	Tajikistan Higher League	20	0	1	0	–		2 (Note: Appearances in the AFC Champions League)	0	1 (Note: Appearances in the Tajik Supercup)	0	24	0
Bnei Yehuda	2023–24	Liga Leumit	1	0	0	0	–		0	0	0	0	1	0
Dinamo Minsk	2024	Belarusian Premier League	3	0	0	0	–		4 (Note: Appearances in the UEFA Conference League)	0	0	0	7	0
Istiklol	2025	Tajikistan Higher League	14	0	2	0	–		5 (Note: Appearances in the AFC Champions League Two)	0	0	0	21	0
Serikspor	2025–26	TFF 1. Lig	3	0	0	0	–		–		–		3	0
Churchill Brothers	2026–27	Indian Super League	2	0	0	0	–		–		–		2	0
Career total			45	0	4	0	-	-	11	0	1	0	61	0

== Honours ==
Istiklol

- Tajikistan Higher League: 2023, 2025
- Tajik Cup: 2023
