= Vose =

Vose is a surname. Notable people with the surname include:

- Christopher Vose (1887–1970), English cross-country runner
- Dominic Vose (born 1993), English footballer
- George L. Vose (1831–1910), American railroad engineer
- George Vose (1911–1981), English footballer
- Horace Vose (1840–1913), Rhode Island turkey farmer
- Michael Vose, New Hampshire politician
- Noel Vose (1921–2016), Australian Baptist minister
- Richard H. Vose (1803–1864), Maine politician
- Roger Vose (1763–1841), New Hampshire politician
- Ruth Vose (1808–1884), wife of Joseph Smith

== Middle name ==
- Edwin Vose Sumner (1797–1863), American Army officer
- Edwin Vose Sumner Jr. (1835–1912), American Army officer
- Katherine Vose Parker (1888–1983), American politician
- Luther Vose Bell (1806–1862), American psychiatrist
- Thomas Vose Daily (1927–2017), American Roman Catholic bishop

== See also ==
- Laurence Vaux (1519–1585), canon regular and Catholic martyr
- Vose' District, Tajikistan
- Vose Seminary, Christian college in Australia
- Hulbuk, of which Vose was a former name
