= 2026 CAFA Silk Way Cup =

CAFA Silk Way Cup 2026
Tournament details
- Host country: Kyrgyzstan; Uzbekistan
- Dates: Qualifying round: TBD 2026; Group stage: TBD 2026
- Teams: Competition proper: 8 (from 6 associations)
- All statistics correct as of 31 August 2025.

The 2026 CAFA Silk Way Cup will be the inaugural edition of Central Asia's premier club football tournament, organized by the Central Asian Football Association (CAFA). It will be the first club competition organized by regional associations since its establishment in 2015.

It was originally planned to take place in March–April 2025. The 2025 competition was postponed due to insufficient sponsorship, to be rescheduled for 2026.

== Association team allocation ==
The slot allocation for the tournament is based on the performance of each association's top club in international Asian competitions. Iran and Uzbekistan, whose top clubs qualified directly for the 2025–26 AFC Champions League Elite and 2025–26 AFC Champions League Two, were each granted one slot. Meanwhile, the remaining four associations received two slots each.

Member association	slots	
Member association	Group stage	Qualifying round
Iran	1	0
Uzbekistan	1	0
Turkmenistan	1	1
Tajikistan	1	1
Kyrgyzstan	1	1
Afghanistan	1	1
Participating associations: 6	6	4
Participating associations: 6	10	

== See also ==
- 2025–26 ASEAN Club Championship
- 2026 SAFF Club Championship
- 2025–26 AGCFF Gulf Club Champions League
