= Sharafdzhon Solekhov =

Tajikistani footballer

Personal information
- Full name: Sharafdzhon Radzhabovich Solekhov
- Date of birth: 14 December 1999 (age 26)
- Place of birth: Ismoili Somoni, Tajikistan
- Height: 1.79 m (5 ft 10 in)
- Position: Midfielder

Team information
- Current team: Regar-TadAZ Tursunzoda
- Number: 7

Senior career*
Years	Team	Apps	(Gls)
2017	CSKA Pamir Dushanbe		
2018	Barkchi		
2019	CSKA Pamir Dushanbe		
2020–2022	Khujand		
2021	→ Fayzkand (loan)	7	(3)
2021–2022	CSKA Dushanbe	23	(8)
2024–	Regar-TadAZ Tursunzoda	12	(5)

International career^{‡}
2018–	Tajikistan	9	(1)
- * Club domestic league appearances and goals as of 15 September 2024 ‡ National team caps and goals as of 19 July 2019

Sharafdzhon Radzhabovich Solekhov (Russian: Шарафджон Раджабович Солехов; born 14 December 1999) is a Tajikistani professional football player.

== Career ==
=== Club ===
On 15 February 2020, FK Khujand announced the signing of Solekhov.

On 1 August 2020, Khujand announced that Solekhov had joined FK Fayzkand on loan for the remainder of the season.

=== International ===
Solekhov made his senior team debut on 13 December 2018 against Oman, scoring his first goal for Tajikistan in the same game.

== Career statistics ==
=== International ===
Tajikistan national team
Year	Apps	Goals
2018	3	1
2019	5	0
Total	8	1

Statistics accurate as of match played 19 July 2019

=== International goals ===
Scores and results list Tajikistan's goal tally first.

#	Date	Venue	Opponent	Score	Result	Competition	Ref.
1.	13 December 2018	Sultan Qaboos Sports Complex, Muscat, Oman	Oman	1–2	1–2	Friendly	
