= Siavash Haghnazari =

Iranian footballer

Personal information
- Date of birth: 3 August 1995 (age 31)
- Place of birth: Tehran, Iran
- Height: 1.78 m (5 ft 10 in)
- Position: Attacking midfielder

Team information
- Current team: AGMK
- Number: 88

Youth career
- Homa
- –2011: Paykan
- 2011–2014: Persepolis
- 2014–2015: Orange County

Senior career*
Years	Team	Apps	(Gls)
2015–2017	Malavan	9	(1)
2017–2018	Skala Stryi	7	(1)
2018–2021	Volyn Lutsk	86	(16)
2022–2023	AGMK	48	(8)
2024–2025	Navbahor Namangan	21	(5)
2025	Nassaji	2	(0)
2025	Istiklol	8	(3)
2026–	AGMK	12	(3)

International career^{‡}
2009–2012	Iran U17	8	(4)
2012–2014	Iran U20	12	(4)
- * Club domestic league appearances and goals as of 28 July 2026 ‡ National team caps and goals as of 29 August 2021

Siavash Haghnazari (Persian: سیاوش حق‌نظری; born 3 August 1995) is an Iranian professional footballer who plays as an attacking midfielder, most recently for Uzbekistan Super League club AGMK. Hagh Nazari became the first Iranian footballer in Uzbekistani football.

== Club career ==
=== Malavan ===
In summer 2015 he joined to Malavan training camp. He signed a two years contract with Malavan to spend his conscription period with them. He made his professional debut for Malavan with netting once on 20 November 2015 while he used as a substitute against Saipa.

=== Skala Stryi ===
Siavash made his debut in Ukraine on 25 September 2017 in a home game loss against Ahrobiznes Volochysk. On 9 November 2017 he became the player of the week.

=== Volyn Lutsk ===
On 23 February 2018 he signed contract with Ukrainian First League club Volyn Lutsk. Hagh Nazari was recognized as the best player of April in 2019 in the Ukrainian First League.

At the end of the 2023 season, after Almalik's contract with OKMK team ended, he signed a contract with Namangan's Navbahor club, which continues its participation in the 2023–24 AFC Champions League.

=== Istiklol ===
On 28 July 2025, Hagh Nazari signed for Tajikistan Higher League club Istiklol, on a contract until the end of 2025. On 8 January 2026, Istiklol announced that Hagh Nazari had left the club after his contract wasn't renewed at the end of the previous season.

== International career ==
=== U17 ===
He played two matches at the 2010 Asian U16 Championships.

=== U20 ===
He was part of Iran U20 during 2014 AFC U-19 Championship.

== Career statistics ==
=== Club ===
As of 29 September 2023

Club	Division	Season	League		National Cup		Other		Total	
Club	Division	Season	Apps	Goals	Apps	Goals	Apps	Goals	Apps	Goals
Malavan	Persian Gulf Pro League	2015–16	6	1	0	0	—		6	1
Malavan	Azadegan League	2016–17	3	0	1	0	—		4	0
Malavan	Azadegan League	2017–18	0	0	0	0	—		0	0
Malavan	Total		9	1	1	0	—		10	1
Skala Stryi	Ukrainian Second League	2017–18	7	1	0	0	—		7	1
Volyn Lutsk	Ukrainian First League	2017–18	10	0	—		—		10	0
Volyn Lutsk	Ukrainian First League	2018–19	27	5	2	0	2	0	31	5
Volyn Lutsk	Ukrainian First League	2019–20	24	5	0	0	—		24	5
Volyn Lutsk	Ukrainian First League	2020–21	13	4	—		—		13	4
Volyn Lutsk	Ukrainian First League	2021–22	12	2	1	0	—		13	2
Volyn Lutsk	Total		86	17	3	0	2	0	91	17
AGMK	Uzbekistan Super League	2022	26	5	6	1	—		32	6
AGMK	Uzbekistan Super League	2023	19	3	4	3	4	1 (Note: Appearance(s) in AFC Champions League)	27	7
Career total			147	26	14	4	6	1	167	31
