= Joshua Akpudje =

Nigerian international footballer (born 1998)

Personal information
- Full name: Joshua Oghene Ochukwu Akpudje
- Date of birth: 23 July 1998 (age 28)
- Place of birth: Lagos, Nigeria
- Height: 1.92 m (6 ft 4 in)
- Position: Centre back

Team information
- Current team: Newroz

Youth career
- Femmak Football Academy

Senior career*
Years	Team	Apps	(Gls)
2019–2020	MFM	29	(2)
2020–2022	Daugavpils	44	(0)
2022	→ Panevėžys (loan)	22	(1)
2022–2023	Jablonec	14	(0)
2024	Dinamo Tbilisi	9	(0)
2024	Ilves	10	(0)
2025	Istiklol	12	(1)
2025	KTP	8	(0)
2026–	Newroz	17	(0)

International career
2019	Nigeria U23	1	(0)
- * Club domestic league appearances and goals as of 17 April 2026

Joshua Oghene-Ochuko Akpudje (born 23 July 1998) is a Nigerian professional footballer who plays as a centre-back for Newroz SC.

== Early career ==
Born in Lagos, Akpudje started his football career with Femmak Football Academy straight out of high school before joining Nigerian Professional Football League side MFM ahead of the abridged season in 2019.

== Club career ==
On 3 March 2020, Akpudje completed a transfer to Latvian club BFC Daugavpils

After playing for two seasons in Latvia, Akpudje moved to Lithuanian side FK Panevėžys on loan in February 2022.

On 12 February 2024, Akpudje signed a two-year contract, with the option of a third, with Dinamo Tbilisi.

On 11 July 2024, he moved to Finland after signing with Ilves in Veikkausliiga. He left club after the season, in which Ilves finished 2nd in the league.

On 24 February 2025, Tajikistan Higher League club Istiklol announced the signing of Akpudje to a one-year contract. On 19 July 2025, Istiklol announced the departure of Akpudje by mutual consent.

On 22 July, Akpudje returned to Finland and signed with Veikkausliiga club KTP for the remainder of the 2025 season.

== International career ==
Akpudje made his international debut for Nigeria U23 side in March 2019 against Libya in an Africa U-23 Cup of Nations qualification game.

== Career statistics ==
As of match played 22 June 2025

Appearances and goals by club, season and competition
Club	Season	Division	League		National cup (Note: Includes Latvian Cup, Lithuanian Cup, Czech Cup, Finnish Cup and Tajikistan Cup)		League cup		Continental		Other		Total	
Club	Season	Division	Apps	Goals	Apps	Goals	Apps	Goals	Apps	Goals	Apps	Goals	Apps	Goals
MFM	2019	NPFL	10	0	–		–		–		–		10	0
MFM	2019–20	NPFL	19	2	–		–		–		–		19	2
MFM	Total		29	2	0	0	0	0	0	0	0	0	29	2
Daugavpils	2020	Virslīga	23	0	1	0	–		–		–		24	0
Daugavpils	2021	Virslīga	21	0	2	0	–		–		–		23	0
Daugavpils	2022	Virslīga	0	0	0	0	–		–		–		23	0
Daugavpils	Total		44	0	3	0	0	0	0	0	0	0	47	0
Panevėžys (loan)	2022	A Lyga	22	1	1	0	–		2 (Note: Appearances in UEFA Conference League)	0	–		25	1
Jablonec	2022–23	Czech First League	14	0	2	0	–		–		–		16	0
Jablonec B	2022–23	ČFL	2	0	–		–		–		–		2	0
Dinamo Tbilisi	2024	Erovnuli Liga	9	0	0	0	–		–		–		9	0
Ilves	2024	Veikkausliiga	10	0	0	0	0	0	3	0	–		13	0
Istiklol	2025	Tajikistan Higher League	12	1	0	0	–		0 (Note: Appearances in AFC Champions League Two)	0	1 (Note: Appearances in Tajik Supercup)	0	13	1
KTP	2025	Veikkausliiga	0	0	0	0	0	0	–		–		0	0
Career total			142	4	6	0	0	0	5	0	1	0	154	1

== Honours ==
Ilves

- Veikkausliiga runner-up: 2024
