= Al-Afreeki SC =

Libyan football club

Al-Afreeki SC نادي الأفريقي
- Full name: Al-Afreeki Sports Club
- Founded: 1952
- Ground: Derna Stadium
- Capacity: 7,000
- League: Libyan Premier League
- 2025–26: 6th, Final Group 2
- Website: Website

Al-Afreeki SC is a Libyan association football club based in Derna currently competing in the Libyan Premier League.
