= Reza Dehghani =

Iranian footballer

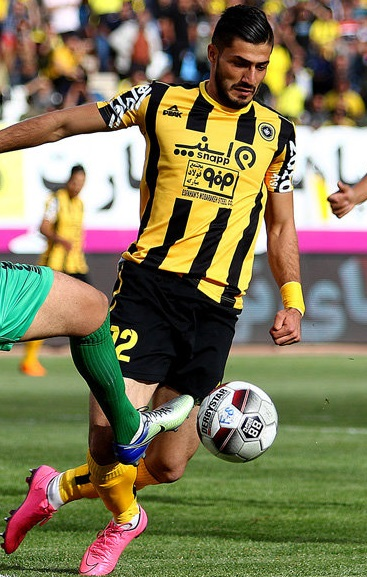

Personal information
- Full name: Reza Dehghani
- Date of birth: 7 January 1998 (age 28)
- Place of birth: Isfahan, Iran
- Height: 1.82 m (6 ft 0 in)
- Position: Left winger

Team information
- Current team: Alay

Youth career
- 2012–2017: Sepahan

Senior career*
Years	Team	Apps	(Gls)
2017–2021	Sepahan	16	(2)
2019–2020	→ Nassaji (loan)	25	(1)
2021	→ Nassaji (loan)	13	(1)
2021	Persepolis	1	(0)
2021–2022	Tractor	16	(2)
2022–2023	Naft Masjed Soleyman	29	(4)
2023	Esteghlal Khuzestan	3	(0)
2024	Mes Rafsanjan	8	(1)
2025	Istiklol	18	(4)
2026–	Alay	0	(0)

International career
2014–2016	Iran U20	16	(2)
- * Club domestic league appearances and goals as of 3 February 2026

Reza Dehghani (Persian: رضا دهقانی, (born 7 January 1998) is an Iranian professional footballer who plays as a winger for Alay in the Kyrgyz Premier League.

== Career ==
He made his Iran Pro League debut on 20 November 2017 against Persepolis.

In August 2021, Dehghani signed a two-year contract with Persepolis.

On 14 February 2025, Tajikistan Higher League club Istiklol announced the signing of Dehghani to a one-year contract. On 8 January 2026, Istiklol announced that Dehghani had left the club after his contract wasn't renewed at the end of the previous season.

On 30 January 2026, Kyrgyz Premier League club Aly announced the signing of Dehghani.

== Career statistics ==
=== Club ===
As of match played 12 December 2025

Club	Season	League			National Cup (Note: Includes Hazfi Cup, Tajikistan Cup)		Continental		Other		Total	
Club	Season	Division	Apps	Goals	Apps	Goals	Apps	Goals	Apps	Goals	Apps	Goals
Sepahan	2017–18	Persian Gulf Pro League	11	2			-		-		11	2
Sepahan	2018–19	Persian Gulf Pro League	3	0			-		-		3	0
Sepahan	2019–20	Persian Gulf Pro League	0	0			-		-		0	0
Sepahan	2020–21	Persian Gulf Pro League	2	0			2 (Note: Appearances and goals in the AFC Champions League)	0	-		4	0
Sepahan	Total		16	2			2	0	0	0	18	2
Nassaji Mazandaran (loan)	2019–20	Persian Gulf Pro League	25	1			-		-		25	1
Nassaji Mazandaran (loan)	2020–21	Persian Gulf Pro League	13	1			-		-		13	1
Persepolis	2021–22	Persian Gulf Pro League	1	0			0	0	-		1	0
Tractor	2021–22	Persian Gulf Pro League	16	2			-		-		16	2
Naft Masjed Soleyman	2022–23	Persian Gulf Pro League	29	4			-		-		29	4
Esteghlal Khuzestan	2023–24	Persian Gulf Pro League	3	0			-		-		3	0
Mes Rafsanjan	2023–24	Persian Gulf Pro League	8	1			-		-		8	1
Istiklol	2025	Tajikistan Higher League	18	4	2	0	4 (Note: Appearances in the AFC Champions League Two)	1	1 (Note: Appearances in the Tajik Supercup)	0	25	5
Career total			129	15	2	0	6	1	1	0	136	16
