= Daler Barotov =

Tajikistani professional football player

Personal information
- Full name: Daler Barotov
- Date of birth: 29 January 1999 (age 27)
- Place of birth: Khujand, Tajikistan
- Height: 1.82 m (6 ft 0 in)
- Position: Goalkeeper

Team information
- Current team: Istaravshan
- Number: 1

Senior career*
Years	Team	Apps	(Gls)
2018-2022	Khujand		
2023–	Istaravshan		

International career^{‡}
2023–	Tajikistan	2	(0)
- * Club domestic league appearances and goals as of 12:31, 5 January 2024 (UTC) ‡ National team caps and goals as of 12:31, 5 January 2024 (UTC)

Daler Barotov (Tajik: Баротов Далер, born 29 January 1999) is a Tajikistani professional football player for Istaravshan and the Tajikistan national team.

== Career ==
=== International ===
Barotov made his senior team debut on 8 September 2023 against Singapore.

Barotov was named as part of Tajikistans squad for the 2023 AFC Asian Cup.

== Career statistics ==
=== International ===
As of match played 17 October 2023

National team	Year	Apps	Goals
Tajikistan	2023	2	0
Total		2	0

== Honours ==
Tajikistan

- Merdeka Tournament: 2023
