= Odil Irgashev =

Tajikistani footballer

Personal information
- Full name: Odil Irgashev
- Date of birth: 10 February 1977 (age 49)
- Place of birth: Tajik SSR, Soviet Union
- Height: 1.70 m (5 ft 7 in)
- Position: Defender

Team information
- Current team: Ravshan Kulob

Senior career*
Years	Team	Apps	(Gls)
1996	Bofanda Dushanbe		
1998–2000	Varzob Dushanbe		
2001	SKA-Pamir Dushanbe		
2001–2003	Yelimay	66	(6)
2004–2006	Regar-TadAZ		
2006–2007	Zhashtyk-Ak-Altyn Kara-Suu		
2007–2009	Regar-TadAZ		
2010–2012	Istiklol		
2012–2014	Ravshan Kulob		

International career^{‡}
2000–2008	Tajikistan	24	(1)
- * Club domestic league appearances and goals as of 11:19, 22 October 2015 (UTC) ‡ National team caps and goals as of 22 October 2015

Odil Irgashev (Russian: Одил Иргашев; born 10 February 1977) is a Tajikistani footballer who is a defender for Ravshan Kulob.

== Career ==
Irgashev has played as a winger for several Tajik clubs, winning the Tajik League three times with Varzob Dushanbe (1998, 1999 and 2000) and winning the Tajik League, Tajik Cup and Tajik Super Cup treble with Esteghlal Dushanbe in 2010.

Irgashev has made several appearances for the Tajikistan national football team, and scored a goal at the 2006 AFC Challenge Cup.

== Career statistics ==
=== International ===
Tajikistan national team
Year	Apps	Goals
2000	1	0
2001	0	0
2002	0	0
2003	7	0
2004	6	0
2005	0	0
2006	6	1
2007	1	0
2008	3	0
Total	24	1

Statistics accurate as of 22 October 2015

=== International goals ===
As of 22 October 2015

#	Date	Venue	Opponent	Score	Result	Competition
1	4 April 2006	Dhaka, Bangladesh	Pakistan	2–0	2–0	2006 AFC Challenge Cup

== Honours ==
Varzob Dushanbe

- Tajik League (2): 1998, 1999, 2000,
- Tajik Cup (1): 1998, 1999

Regar-TadAZ

- Tajik League (1): 2004, 2006, 2007, 2008
- Tajik Cup (2): 2005, 2006
- AFC President's Cup (1): 2005

Tajikistan

- AFC Challenge Cup (1): 2006
