= 2000 Commonwealth of Independent States Cup =

CIS Cup, Кубок Содружества 2000

Tournament details
- Host country: Russia
- Dates: 22–30 January 2000
- Teams: 16
- Venues: 2 (in 1 host city)

Final positions
- Champions: (Russia) Spartak Moscow (5th title)

Tournament statistics
- Matches played: 29
- Goals scored: 116 (4 per match)
- Top scorer(s): (Russia) Yegor Titov (Brazil) Luis Robson (Latvia) Vladimirs Koļesņičenko (5 goals)

The 2000 Commonwealth of Independent States Cup was the eighth edition of the competition between the champions of former republics of Soviet Union. It was won by Spartak Moscow for the fifth time. For the second time in a row the competition was played in a two-division format introduced a year before.

== Participants ==
Team	Qualification	Participation
Top Division
(Russia) Spartak Moscow	1999 Russian Top Division champions	7th
(Ukraine) Dynamo Kyiv	1998–99 Vyshcha Liha champions ^{1}	5th
(Belarus) BATE Borisov	1999 Belarusian Premier League champions	1st
(Lithuania) Žalgiris Kaunas	1999 A Lyga champions	2nd
(Latvia) Skonto Riga	1999 Latvian Higher League champions	8th
(Azerbaijan) Kapaz Ganja	1998–99 Azerbaijan Top League champions	4th
(Moldova) Zimbru Chișinău	1998–99 Moldovan National Division champions	7th
(Armenia) Shirak Gyumri	1999 Armenian Premier League champions	2nd
First Division
(Georgia (country)) Dinamo Tbilisi	1998–99 Umaglesi Liga champions	8th
(Turkmenistan) Nisa Aşgabat	1998–99 Ýokary Liga champions	1st
(Estonia) Levadia Maardu	1999 Meistriliiga champions	1st
(Kazakhstan) Irtysh-Bastau Pavlodar	1999 Kazakhstan Premier League champions	3rd
(Uzbekistan) Dustlik Tashkent	1999 Uzbek League champions	1st
(Tajikistan) Varzob Dushanbe	1999 Tajik League champions	2nd
(Kyrgyzstan) CAG-Dinamo-MVD Bishkek	1999 Kyrgyzstan League champions	3rd
Russia U19	Unofficial entry, not eligible for promotion	2nd

- ^{1} Dynamo Kyiv were represented mostly by Dynamo-2 and Dynamo-3 players, with a few additions from the main team.
- For the first time in competition history all 15 current champions of post-Soviet countries were represented, with no withdrawals or substitutions.

== First Division ==
=== Group C ===
- Unofficial table

Team	Pld	W	D	L	GF	GA	GD	Pts
(Uzbekistan) Dustlik Tashkent	3	2	0	1	6	5	+1	6
(Turkmenistan) Nisa Aşgabat	3	1	1	1	7	6	+1	4
Russia U19	3	1	1	1	4	5	−1	4
(Estonia) Levadia Maardu	3	1	0	2	6	7	−1	3

- Official table

Team	Pld	W	D	L	GF	GA	GD	Pts
(Turkmenistan) Nisa Aşgabat	2	1	0	1	5	4	+1	3
(Estonia) Levadia Maardu	2	1	0	1	5	5	0	3
(Uzbekistan) Dustlik Tashkent	2	1	0	1	4	5	−1	3

- Turkmenistan promoted to the Top Division

==== Results ====
22 January 2000
13:00

Nisa Aşgabat (Turkmenistan)	2 – 2	Russia U19
Kuljagazow 41'; Agabaýew 75'		Gorokhov 51'; Tokarev 90'

Spartak Manege, Moscow
Attendance: 200
Referee: Romāns Lajuks (Latvia)
22 January 2000
17:00

Dustlik Tashkent (Uzbekistan)	1 – 4	(Estonia) Levadia Maardu
Davletov 35'		V.Leitan 3', 6'; Kolbasenko 14', 48' (pen.)

Spartak Manege, Moscow
Attendance: 200
Referee: Sergo Kvaratskhelia (Georgia)

23 January 2000
13:00

Russia U19	0 – 2	(Uzbekistan) Dustlik Tashkent
		Khasanov 3' (pen.); S.Kurbonov 73'

Spartak Manege, Moscow
Attendance: 250
Referee: Oleg Chikun (Belarus)
23 January 2000
17:00

Levadia Maardu (Estonia)	1 – 4	(Turkmenistan) Nisa Aşgabat
Kolbasenko 40'		Kulyýew 24'; Agabaýew 27'; Bayliev 66'; Kuljagazow 89'

Spartak Manege, Moscow
Attendance: 200
Referee: Vasyl Melnychuk (Ukraine)

25 January 2000
13:00

Levadia Maardu (Estonia)	1 – 2	Russia U19
V.Leitan 40'		Tokarev 36'; Kalimullin 86' (o.g.)

Spartak Manege, Moscow
Attendance: 200
Referee: Asim Khudiev (Azerbaijan)
25 January 2000
17:00

Dustlik Tashkent (Uzbekistan)	3 – 1	(Turkmenistan) Nisa Aşgabat
M.Kurbonov 47', 85'; Davletov 59'		Goçgulyýew 81'

Spartak Manege, Moscow
Attendance: 200
Referee: Karen Nalbandyan (Armenia)

=== Group D ===
Team	Pld	W	D	L	GF	GA	GD	Pts
(Tajikistan) Varzob Dushanbe	3	2	1	0	8	5	+3	7
(Georgia (country)) Dinamo Tbilisi	3	2	0	1	13	9	+4	6
(Kazakhstan) Irtysh-Bastau Pavlodar	3	1	1	1	10	8	+2	4
(Kyrgyzstan) CAG-Dinamo-MVD Bishkek	3	0	0	3	3	12	−9	0

- Tajikistan promoted to the Top Division

==== Results ====
22 January 2000
15:00

Dinamo Tbilisi (Georgia (country))	5 – 2	(Kyrgyzstan) CAG-Dinamo-MVD Bishkek
Aleksidze 23', 43'; Kebadze 40'; Tsitaishvili 67'; Nemsadze 88'		Salo 50'; Ivanov 54'

Spartak Manege, Moscow
Attendance: 800
Referee: Vladimir Antonov (Moldova)
22 January 2000
19:00

Varzob Dushanbe (Tajikistan)	2 – 2	(Kazakhstan) Irtysh-Bastau Pavlodar
Knyazev 24'; Khamidov 28'		Mendes 36' (pen.); Klishin 44'

Spartak Manege, Moscow
Attendance: 300
Referee: Valentin Ivanov (Russia)

23 January 2000
15:00

Dinamo Tbilisi (Georgia (country))	3 – 5	(Tajikistan) Varzob Dushanbe
Aleksidze 14'; Anchabadze 54'; Tsitaishvili 77'		Nazarov 32', 79'; Ashurmamadov 44'; Khamidov 62' (pen.), 68'

Spartak Manege, Moscow
Attendance: 350
Referee: Asim Khudiev (Azerbaijan)
23 January 2000
19:00

Irtysh-Bastau Pavlodar (Kazakhstan)	6 – 1	(Kyrgyzstan) CAG-Dinamo-MVD Bishkek
Mendes 5'; Zubarev 21', 33', 71'; Miroshnichenko 30'; Gumar 52'		Krokhmal 59'

Spartak Manege, Moscow
Attendance: 200
Referee: Yuri Baskakov (Russia)

25 January 2000
15:00

CAG-Dinamo-MVD Bishkek (Kyrgyzstan)	0 – 1	(Tajikistan) Varzob Dushanbe
		Khamidov 67'

Spartak Manege, Moscow
Attendance: 200
Referee: Romāns Lajuks (Latvia)
25 January 2000
19:00

Irtysh-Bastau Pavlodar (Kazakhstan)	2 – 5	(Georgia (country)) Dinamo Tbilisi
Zubarev 25'; Miroshnichenko 37'		Anchabadze 44'; Datvadze 53'; Nemsadze 76', 86'; Kebadze 90'

Spartak Manege, Moscow
Attendance: 350
Referee: Vasyl Melnychuk (Ukraine)

== Top Division ==
=== Group A ===
Team	Pld	W	D	L	GF	GA	GD	Pts
(Russia) Spartak Moscow	3	3	0	0	11	2	+9	9
(Moldova) Zimbru Chișinău	3	2	0	1	6	4	+2	6
(Lithuania) Žalgiris Kaunas	3	1	0	2	3	4	−1	3
(Azerbaijan) Kapaz Ganja	3	0	0	3	1	11	−10	0

- Azerbaijan relegated to First Division

==== Results ====
22 January 2000
13:00

Žalgiris Kaunas (Lithuania)	1 – 2	(Moldova) Zimbru Chișinău
Kšanavičius 16'		Kulik 25', 62'

Olympic Sport Complex, Moscow
Attendance: 400
Referee: Karen Nalbandyan (Armenia)
22 January 2000
19:00

Spartak Moscow (Russia)	6 – 1	(Azerbaijan) Kapaz Ganja
Robson 4', 55'; Baranov 12'; Titov 32'; Shchyogolev 77'; Shirko 78'		Rzayev 63'

Olympic Sport Complex, Moscow
Attendance: 9,000
Referee: Oleg Timofejev (Estonia)

23 January 2000
13:00

Kapaz Ganja (Azerbaijan)	0 – 2	(Lithuania) Žalgiris Kaunas
		Mammadov 40' (o.g.); Dedura 88'

Olympic Sport Complex, Moscow
Attendance: 1,000
Referee: Sergey Tsaregradskiy (Kazakhstan)
23 January 2000
19:00

Zimbru Chișinău (Moldova)	1 – 3	(Russia) Spartak Moscow
Miterev 25'		Baranov 16'; Titov 49', 86'

Olympic Sport Complex, Moscow
Attendance: 8,000
Referee: Kiyomiddin Safarov (Tajikistan)

25 January 2000
13:00

Kapaz Ganja (Azerbaijan)	0 – 3	(Moldova) Zimbru Chișinău
		Hilazyev 17'; Miterev 18'; Gușilă 77'

Olympic Sport Complex, Moscow
Attendance: 200
Referee: Valentin Ivanov (Russia)
25 January 2000
19:00

Spartak Moscow (Russia)	2 – 0	(Lithuania) Žalgiris Kaunas
Robson 19'; Titov 35'

Olympic Sport Complex, Moscow
Attendance: 5,000
Referee: Vladimir Antonov (Moldova)

=== Group B ===
Team	Pld	W	D	L	GF	GA	GD	Pts
(Latvia) Skonto Riga	3	3	0	0	11	2	+9	9
(Belarus) BATE Borisov	3	1	1	1	6	4	+2	4
(Ukraine) Dynamo Kyiv	3	1	1	1	1	5	−4	4
(Armenia) Shirak Gyumri	3	0	0	3	2	9	−7	0

- Armenia relegated to First Division

==== Results ====
22 January 2000
15:00

Shirak Gyumri (Armenia)	1 – 3	(Latvia) Skonto Riga
Harutyunyan 39' (pen.)		Rekhviashvili 3'; Chaladze 29'; Rubins 35'

Olympic Sport Complex, Moscow
Attendance: 2,000
Referee: Rashid Aytekov (Uzbekistan)
22 January 2000
17:00

Dynamo Kyiv (Ukraine)	0 – 0	(Belarus) BATE Borisov

Olympic Sport Complex, Moscow
Attendance: 2,500
Referee: Gercas Žakas (Lithuania)

23 January 2000
15:00

BATE Borisov (Belarus)	1 – 3	(Latvia) Skonto Riga
Kutuzov 8'		Koļesņičenko 16'; Zemļinskis 33' (pen.); Tereškinas 47'

Olympic Sport Complex, Moscow
Attendance: 2,500
Referee: Eldar Ramazanov (Turkmenistan)
23 January 2000
17:00

Dynamo Kyiv (Ukraine)	1 – 0	(Armenia) Shirak Gyumri
Konovalov 83'

Olympic Sport Complex, Moscow
Attendance: 1,500
Referee: Viktor Kolpakov (Kyrgyzstan)

25 January 2000
15:00

Shirak Gyumri (Armenia)	1 – 5	(Belarus) BATE Borisov
Petrosyan 73'		Lahun 41'; Akulich 67'; Lashankow 76'; Yermakovich 77'; Kutuzov 90'

Olympic Sport Complex, Moscow
Attendance: 500
Referee: Yuri Baskakov (Russia)
25 January 2000
17:00

Skonto Riga (Latvia)	5 – 0	(Ukraine) Dynamo Kyiv
Buitkus 16'; Koļesņičenko 40', 42', 59', 73'

Olympic Sport Complex, Moscow
Attendance: 2,500
Referee: Sergo Kvaratskhelia (Georgia)

== Final rounds ==
=== Semifinal ===
- Two results carried over from the First Round: Zimbru v Spartak 1–3 and BATE v Skonto 1–3

Team	Pld	W	D	L	GF	GA	GD	Pts
(Russia) Spartak Moscow	3	2	0	1	9	4	+5	6
(Moldova) Zimbru Chișinău	3	2	0	1	7	3	+4	6
(Latvia) Skonto Riga	3	2	0	1	5	4	+1	6
(Belarus) BATE Borisov	3	0	0	3	2	12	−10	0

==== Results ====
26 January 2000
16:30

Zimbru Chișinău (Moldova)	2 – 0	(Latvia) Skonto Riga
Berco 73'; Gușilă 84'

Olympic Sport Complex, Moscow
Attendance: 1,000
Referee: Valentin Ivanov (Russia)
26 January 2000
19:00

Spartak Moscow (Russia)	5 – 1	(Belarus) BATE Borisov
Shirko 16'; Robson 45', 52'; Kechinov 70'; Buznikin 90'		Hleb 26'

Olympic Sport Complex, Moscow
Attendance: 5,000
Referee: Vasyl Melnychuk (Ukraine)

28 January 2000
16:30

BATE Borisov (Belarus)	0 – 4	(Moldova) Zimbru Chișinău
		Boreț 13'; Kulik 32'; Miterev 58'; Butelschi 79'

Olympic Sport Complex, Moscow
Attendance: 1,000
Referee: Oleg Timofejev (Estonia)
28 January 2000
19:00

Skonto Riga (Latvia)	2 – 1	(Russia) Spartak Moscow
Buitkus 46'; Zemļinskis 49' (pen.)		Shirko 8'

Olympic Sport Complex, Moscow
Attendance: 6,000
Referee: Karen Nalbandyan (Armenia)

=== Final ===
30 January 2000
14:00

Spartak Moscow (Russia)	3 – 0	(Moldova) Zimbru Chișinău
Shirko 28'; Bulatov 68'; Titov 81'

Olympic Sport Complex, Moscow
Attendance: 16,000
Referee: Vasyl Melnychuk (Ukraine)

== Top scorers ==
Rank	Player	Team	Goals
1	(Russia) Yegor Titov	(Russia) Spartak Moscow	5
1	(Brazil) Luis Robson	(Russia) Spartak Moscow	5
1	(Latvia) Vladimirs Koļesņičenko	(Latvia) Skonto Riga	5
4	(Russia) Aleksandr Shirko	(Russia) Spartak Moscow	4
4	(Kazakhstan) Viktor Zubarev	(Kazakhstan) Irtysh-Bastau Pavlodar	4
4	(Tajikistan) Sukhrob Khamidov	(Tajikistan) Varzob Dushanbe	4
