= Rustam Khojayev =

Tajikistani footballer and manager

Rustam Khodjayev
Personal information
- Full name: Rustam Khodjayev
- Date of birth: 2 January 1973 (age 53)
- Place of birth: Soviet Union
- Position: Midfielder

Senior career*
Years	Team	Apps	(Gls)
1994	Shodmon Ghissar		
1995–1996	Sitora Dushanbe		
1997	Shakhtyor Soligorsk	10	(0)
1997	Sitora Dushanbe		
1998–1999	Varzob Dushanbe		
2000–2002	Shakhtyor Soligorsk	74	(6)
2003–2004	Ekibastuzets	31	(2)
2005–2006	Regar-TadAZ		
2007	Hima Dushanbe		
2009–2014	Vakhsh Qurghonteppa		

International career^{‡}
1997–2006	Tajikistan	15	(4)

Managerial career
- 2013–2014: Khayr Vahdat
- 2017: Khujand
- 2018: Panjshir
- 2019: CSKA Pamir Dushanbe
- 2026: FC Sador
- * Club domestic league appearances and goals as of 18 October 2019 ‡ National team caps and goals as of 22 October 2015

Rustam Khojayev (born 2 January 1973) is a retired Tajikistani footballer and current manager.

== Career ==
On 21 August 2018, Khojayev was appointed as manager of FC Panjshir.

On 5 January 2019, Khojayev was appointed as the new manager of CSKA Pamir Dushanbe. On 23 June 2019, Khojayev resigned as manager of CSKA Pamir Dushanbe.

== Career statistics ==
=== International ===
Tajikistan national team
Year	Apps	Goals
1997	3	0
1998	0	0
1999	3	0
2000	2	3
2001	0	0
2002	0	0
2003	0	0
2004	1	0
2005	0	0
2006	6	1
Total	15	4

Statistics accurate as of 22 October 2015

=== International goals ===
Scores and results list Tajikistan's goal tally first.

No.	Date	Venue	Opponent	Score	Result	Competition
1	26 November 2000	Takhti Stadium, Tabriz, Iran	Guam	5–0	16–0	2002 FIFA World Cup qualification
2	26 November 2000	Takhti Stadium, Tabriz, Iran	Guam	7–0	16–0	2002 FIFA World Cup qualification
3	26 November 2000	Takhti Stadium, Tabriz, Iran	Guam	12–0	16–0	2002 FIFA World Cup qualification
4	2 April 2006	Dhaka Stadium, Dhaka, Bangladesh	Macau	4–0	4–0	2006 AFC Challenge Cup

== Honours ==
Varzob Dushanbe

- Tajik League (2): 1998, 1999
- Tajik Cup (1): 1998, 1999

Regar-TadAZ

- Tajik League (1): 2006
- Tajik Cup (2): 2005, 2006
- AFC President's Cup (1): 2005

Vakhsh Qurghonteppa

- Tajik League (1): 2009

Tajikistan

- AFC Challenge Cup (1): 2006
