= Umed Khabibulloyev =

Tajikistani footballer

Personal information
- Date of birth: 12 November 1978 (age 47)
- Place of birth: Tajik SSR
- Position: Defender

Senior career*
Years	Team	Apps	(Gls)
1996	Sitora Dushanbe		
1998–2000	Varzob Dushanbe		
2001–2002	Zhetysu		
2003	Hang Khong Viet Nam		
2004	Nasaf	14	(0)
2004	Thể Công		
2005	Sho'rtan G'uzor	5	(0)
2008–2009	Khujand		
2010–2012	Istiklol		

International career^{‡}
2004–2011	Tajikistan	2	(0)
- * Club domestic league appearances and goals as of 9 January 2015 ‡ National team caps and goals as of 9 January 2015

Umed Khabibulloyev (born 12 November 1978) is a Tajikistani footballer who plays as a defender most recently for FC Istiklol and the Tajikistan national football team.

== Career statistics ==
=== International ===
Tajikistan national team
Year	Apps	Goals
2004	1	0
2011	1	0
Total	2	0

Statistics accurate as of match played 6 September 2011

== Honors ==
Varzob Dushanbe

- Tajik League (3): 1998, 1999, 2000
- Tajik Cup (2): 1998, 1999

Khujand

- Tajik Cup (2): 2008

Istiklol

- Tajik League (2): 2010, 2011
- Tajik Cup (1): 2010
