= Rustam Kurbanov =

Tajikistani footballer

Personal information
- Full name: Rustam Raçaʙovic Kurʙanov
- Date of birth: 12 June 1966 (age 60)
- Place of birth: Tajik SSR, Soviet Union
- Position: Midfielder

Senior career*
Years	Team	Apps	(Gls)
1993–1996	Sitora Dushanbe		
1997	Shakhtyor Soligorsk	3	(0)
1997	Dynamo Brest	1	(0)
1998–2000	Varzob Dushanbe		

International career^{‡}
1993–1999	Tajikistan	12	(0)
- * Club domestic league appearances and goals as of 08:16, 8 March 2022 (UTC) ‡ National team caps and goals as of 08:16, 8 March 2022 (UTC)

Rustam Raçaʙovic Kurbanov (Tajik: Рустам Раҷабович Курбанов; born 12 June 1966) is a former Tajikistani international footballer and current Youth Team Head Coach at Istiklol.

== Career ==
=== Coaching ===
On 7 March 2022, Kurbanov was appointed as the Youth Team Head Coach at Istiklol.

== Career statistics ==
=== International ===
Tajikistan national team
Year	Apps	Goals
1993	2	0
1994	2	0
1995	0	0
1996	3	0
1997	6	0
1998	0	0
1999	1	0
Total	12	0

Statistics accurate as of 7 August 1999

== Honours ==
Sitora Dushanbe

- Tajik League (2): 1993, 1994
- Tajik Cup (1): 1993

Varzob Dushanbe

- Tajik League (3): 1998, 1999, 2000,
- Tajik Cup (2): 1998, 1999
