= Aliyor Ashurmamadov =

Tajikistani footballer (born 1970)

Personal information
- Full name: Aliyor Devlokhovich Ashurmamadov
- Date of birth: 20 August 1970 (age 56)
- Place of birth: Qurghonteppa, Tajik SSR
- Height: 1.88 m (6 ft 2 in)
- Position: Striker

Team information
- Current team: Regar-TadAZ Tursunzoda (manager)

Senior career*
Years	Team	Apps	(Gls)
1990	Vakhsh Qurghonteppa	37	(8)
1991–1992	FC Pamir Dushanbe		
1993	FC Lokomotiv Moscow	1	(0)
1993	FC Viktor-Gigant Voskresensk	26	(8)
1994	FC Lokomotiv Moscow	0	(0)
1994	FC Avangard Kolomna	30	(6)
1995	FC Avtozapchast Baksan	6	(1)
1995–1997	FC Anzhi Makhachkala	89	(16)
1999–2000	Varzob Dushanbe		
2001	FC Irtysh	28	(8)
2005	SKA-Pamir Dushanbe		
2005–2007	Hima Dushanbe		

International career
1992–2006	Tajikistan	15	(8)

Managerial career
- 2009: CSKA Pamir Dushanbe
- 2009–2010: Tajikistan U19
- 2010: Energetik Dushanbe
- 2011: CSKA Pamir Dushanbe (assistant)
- 2012–2013: CSKA Pamir Dushanbe
- 2013–2014: Parvoz Bobojon Ghafurov
- 2015: Daleron-Uroteppa
- 2016: Khosilot Farkhor (assistant)
- 2017: Khosilot Farkhor
- 2018–2019: Panjshir
- 2020: Istaravshan
- 2020–2021: CSKA Pamir Dushanbe
- 2021–2022: Dushanbe-83
- 2022–: Regar-TadAZ Tursunzoda
- * Club domestic league appearances and goals

Aliyor Devlokhovich Ashurmamadov (Russian: Алиёр Девлохович Ашурмамадов; born on 20 August 1970) is a Tajikistani football coach and a former player who played for FC Lokomotiv Moscow, FC Anzhi Makhachkala, and FC Irtysh. He is the manager of Regar-TadAZ Tursunzoda. He was a member of the Tajikistan national football team.

== Career ==
=== Managerial ===
On 23 January 2018, Panjshir appointed Ashurmamadov as their manager.

== Career statistics ==
=== International ===
Tajikistan national team
Year	Apps	Goals
1992	2	2
1993	0	0
1994	0	0
1995	0	0
1996	2	2
1997	5	1
1998	0	0
1999	2	0
2000	2	2
2001	0	0
2002	0	0
2003	0	0
2004	0	0
2005	1	1
2006	1	0
Total	15	8

Scores and results list Tajikistan's goal tally first, score column indicates score after each Ashurmamadov goal.

List of international goals scored by Aliyor Ashurmamadov
No.	Date	Venue	Opponent	Score	Result	Competition
1	11 July 1992	Köpetdag Stadium, Ashgabat, Turkmenistan	Turkmenistan	2–1	3–3	Friendly
2	11 July 1992	Köpetdag Stadium, Ashgabat, Turkmenistan	Turkmenistan	3–1	3–3	Friendly
3	8 May 1996	Pamir Stadium, Dushanbe, Tajikistan	Uzbekistan	2–0	4–0	1996 AFC Asian Cup qualification
4	8 May 1996	Pamir Stadium, Dushanbe, Tajikistan	Uzbekistan	3–0	4–0	1996 AFC Asian Cup qualification
5	1 June 1997	Thống Nhất Stadium, Ho Chi Minh City, Vietnam	Vietnam	4–0	4–0	1998 FIFA World Cup qualification
6	26 November 2000	Takhti Stadium, Tabriz, Iran	Guam	1–0	16–0	2002 FIFA World Cup qualification
7	26 November 2000	Takhti Stadium, Tabriz, Iran	Guam	3–0	16–0	2002 FIFA World Cup qualification
8	8 November 2005	Pamir Stadium, Dushanbe, Tajikistan	Afghanistan	4–0	4–0	Friendly

== Honours ==
Pamir Dushanbe

- Tajik League (1): 1992
- Tajik Cup (1): 1992

Varzob Dushanbe

- Tajik League (2): 1999, 2000
- Tajik Cup (1): 1999
