= Anvar Norkulov =

Tajikistani footballer

Personal information
- Full name: Anvar Abdukhalilovich Norkulov
- Date of birth: 4 November 1975 (age 50)
- Position: Midfielder

Senior career*
| Years | Team | Apps | (Gls) |
| 1992 | Khujand | | |
| 1993 | Lokomotiv Kagan | | |
| 1994 | Mehnat | | |
| 1995-1998 | Khujand | | |
| 1998–1999 | Varzob Dushanbe | | |
| 2000 | Semurg Angren | 1 | (0) |
| 2000 | Khujand | | |
| 2001 | Metallurg Bekabad | 12 | (0) |
| 2002–2005 | Aviator Bobojon Ghafurov | | |
| 2006 | Khujand | | |
| 2007–2008 | Parvoz Bobojon Ghafurov | | |
| 2009 | Vahsh Qurghonteppa | | |
| 2010 | Istiklol | | |
| 2011 | Parvoz Bobojon Ghafurov | | |
| 2012–2013 | Khujand | | |

International career^{‡}
| 2003–2008 | Tajikistan | 16 | (0) |
- * Club domestic league appearances and goals as of 17 February 2020 ‡ National team caps and goals as of 17 February 2020

Anvar Abdukhalilovich Norkulov (born 4 November 1975) is a retired Tajikistani footballer who played for the Tajikistan national football team and who is currently an assistant coach at FC Istiklol.

== Career ==
=== Managerial ===
In February 2020, Norkulov was confirmed as an assistant coach to Vitaliy Levchenko at FC Istiklol, having previously worked with Levchenko at Khujand in 2019.

== Career statistics ==
=== International ===
Tajikistan national team
| Year | Apps | Goals |
|---|---|---|
| 2003 | 6 | 0 |
| 2004 | 5 | 0 |
| 2005 | 0 | 0 |
| 2006 | 0 | 0 |
| 2007 | 0 | 0 |
| 2008 | 5 | 0 |
| Total | 16 | 0 |

== Honours ==
Varzob Dushanbe

- Tajik League (2): 1998, 1999
- Tajik Cup (2): 1998, 1999

Parvoz Bobojon Gafurov

- Tajik Cup (2): 2004, 2007

Vahsh Qurghonteppa

- Tajik League (1): 2009

Istiklol

- Tajik League (1): 2010
- Tajik Cup (1): 2010
