= 1999 Commonwealth of Independent States Cup =

CIS Cup, Кубок Содружества 1999

Tournament details
- Host country: Russia
- Dates: 23–31 January 1999
- Teams: 16
- Venue: 3 (in 1 host city)

Final positions
- Champions: (Russia) Spartak Moscow (4th title)

Tournament statistics
- Matches played: 29
- Goals scored: 90 (3.1 per match)
- Top scorer(s): (Latvia) Mihails Miholaps (7 goals)

The 1999 Commonwealth of Independent States Cup was the seventh edition of the competition between the champions of former republics of Soviet Union. It was won by Spartak Moscow for the fourth time.

== Format change ==
Starting with this edition of the tournament, all participating nations were split into two divisions. Eight nations which were represented in 1998 Cup quarterfinals were included in the Top Division, while the other seven nations included in the First Division. This format lasted for three years (1999–2001), before being reverted to the previous format (used from 1996 till 1998). The change was implemented to reduce the number of non-competitive games between opponents with big strength gap, such as 1998 match between Spartak Moscow and Vakhsh Qurghonteppa, which was won by the Russian side with a record-setting score 19–0.

- Top Division: In the first round, eight participants are split into two groups (A and B). Nations, whose representatives finish last in their groups, are being relegated to the First Division for the next season. Two best-placed clubs from each group will advance to the semifinal round, with two games between the clubs advanced from the same group being carried over from the first round. In the semifinal round, clubs will play two games against two teams which qualified from the opposing First Round group. Two best clubs of the semifinal round table advance to the final match.
- First Division: Seven nations of the First Division are split into two groups (C and D). Unofficial participant Russia U21 national team is added to one of the groups, but their games are not counted for the official table. Nations, whose representatives win their groups, are being promoted to the Top Division for the next season.

== Participants ==
Team	Qualification	Participation
Top Division
(Russia) Spartak Moscow	1998 Russian Top Division champions	6th
(Ukraine) Dynamo Kyiv	1997–98 Vyshcha Liha champions	4th
(Belarus) Dnepr-Transmash Mogilev	1998 Belarusian Premier League champions	1st
(Lithuania) FBK Kaunas	1998–99 A Lyga 2nd team as of the winter break ^{1}	1st
(Latvia) Skonto Riga	1998 Latvian Higher League champions	7th
(Georgia (country)) Dinamo Tbilisi	1997–98 Umaglesi Liga champions ^{2}	7th
(Azerbaijan) Kapaz Ganja	1997–98 Azerbaijan Top League champions	3rd
(Turkmenistan) Köpetdag Aşgabat	1997–98 Ýokary Liga champions	7th
First Division
(Estonia) Tulevik Viljandi	1998 Meistriliiga 5th team ^{3}	2nd
(Moldova) Zimbru Chișinău	1997–98 Moldovan National Division champions	6th
(Armenia) Tsement Ararat	1998 Armenian Premier League champions	1st
(Kazakhstan) Yelimay Semipalatinsk	1998 Kazakhstan Premier League champions	3rd
(Tajikistan) Varzob Dushanbe	1998 Tajik League champions	1st
(Kyrgyzstan) CAG-Dinamo-MVD Bishkek	1998 Kyrgyzstan League champions	2nd
Russia U21	Unofficial entry, not eligible for promotion	5th
(Russia) Spartak-2 Moscow	Unofficial entry, not eligible for promotion ^{4}	1st

- ^{1} FBK Kaunas replaced Žalgiris Vilnius (league's top team at the winter break), who withdrew after delegating most of its players to the national youth teams during tournament's time frame.
- ^{2} Dinamo Tbilisi were represented by youth/reserve players.
- ^{3} Tulevik Viljandi participated as a farm club of Flora Tallinn (1998 Estonian champions).
- ^{4} Spartak-2 Moscow replaced (Uzbekistan) Pakhtakor Tashkent (1998 Uzbek champions), who withdrew along with other Uzbek teams.

== First Division ==
=== Group C ===
- Unofficial table

Team	Pld	W	D	L	GF	GA	GD	Pts
(Moldova) Zimbru Chișinău	3	2	1	0	6	1	+5	7
Russia U21	3	2	1	0	5	0	+5	7
(Estonia) Tulevik Viljandi	3	1	0	2	3	7	−4	3
(Kyrgyzstan) CAG-Dinamo-MVD Bishkek	3	0	0	3	1	7	−6	0

- Official table

Team	Pld	W	D	L	GF	GA	GD	Pts
(Moldova) Zimbru Chișinău	2	2	0	0	6	1	+5	6
(Estonia) Tulevik Viljandi	2	1	0	1	3	5	−2	3
(Kyrgyzstan) CAG-Dinamo-MVD Bishkek	2	0	0	2	1	4	−3	0

- Moldova promoted to the Top Division

==== Results ====
23 January 1999
13:00

Zimbru Chișinău (Moldova)	0 – 0	Russia U21

Spartak Manege, Moscow
Attendance: 100
Referee: Rahmon Murtazayev (Tajikistan)
23 January 1999
15:00

CAG-Dinamo-MVD Bishkek (Kyrgyzstan)	1 – 2	(Estonia) Tulevik Viljandi
Salo 38' (pen.)		Dovydėnas 45'; Musayev 83'

Spartak Manege, Moscow
Attendance: 300
Referee: Slavik Kazaryan (Armenia)

24 January 1999
13:00

Russia U21	3 – 0	(Kyrgyzstan) CAG-Dinamo-MVD Bishkek
Adiyev 25'; Fishman 62'; Borisov 76'

Spartak Manege, Moscow
Attendance: 100
Referee: Sergei Frantsuzov (Russia)
24 January 1999
15:00

Tulevik Viljandi (Estonia)	1 – 4	(Moldova) Zimbru Chișinău
Dovydėnas 4'		Cleșcenco 6', 86'; Hilazyev 44'; Catînsus 90'

Spartak Manege, Moscow
Attendance: 400
Referee: Sergo Kvaratskhelia (Georgia)

26 January 1999
13:00

Tulevik Viljandi (Estonia)	0 – 2	Russia U21
		Kantonistov 27' (pen.); Vishnevskiy 62'

Spartak Manege, Moscow
Attendance: 100
Referee: Allabergen Sapaev (Turkmenistan)
26 January 1999
15:00

Zimbru Chișinău (Moldova)	2 – 0	(Kyrgyzstan) CAG-Dinamo-MVD Bishkek
Butelschi 30'; Boreț 89'

Spartak Manege, Moscow
Attendance: 300
Referee: Slavik Kazaryan (Armenia)

=== Group D ===
- Unofficial table

Team	Pld	W	D	L	GF	GA	GD	Pts
(Russia) Spartak-2 Moscow	3	3	0	0	5	1	+4	9
(Armenia) Tsement Ararat	3	2	0	1	4	3	+1	6
(Kazakhstan) Yelimay Semipalatinsk	3	0	1	2	3	5	−2	1
(Tajikistan) Varzob Dushanbe	3	0	1	2	2	5	−3	1

- Official table

Team	Pld	W	D	L	GF	GA	GD	Pts
(Armenia) Tsement Ararat	2	2	0	0	4	2	+2	6
(Kazakhstan) Yelimay Semipalatinsk	2	0	1	1	2	3	−1	1
(Tajikistan) Varzob Dushanbe	2	0	1	1	2	3	−1	1

- Armenia promoted to the Top Division

==== Results ====
23 January 1999
17:00

Spartak-2 Moscow (Russia)	1 – 0	(Armenia) Tsement Ararat
Perednya 81'

Spartak Manege, Moscow
Attendance: 300
Referee: Khagani Mamedov (Azerbaijan)
23 January 1999
19:00

Varzob Dushanbe (Tajikistan)	1 – 1	(Kazakhstan) Yelimay Semipalatinsk
Norkulov 58'		Vishnyakov 88'

Spartak Manege, Moscow
Attendance: 500
Referee: Yuri Chebotaryov (Russia)

24 January 1999
17:00

Tsement Ararat (Armenia)	2 – 1	(Tajikistan) Varzob Dushanbe
Voskanyan 56'; Sarikyan 75'		Volkov 25'

Spartak Manege, Moscow
Attendance: 250
Referee: Yuri Baskakov (Russia)
24 January 1999
19:00

Yelimay Semipalatinsk (Kazakhstan)	1 – 2	(Russia) Spartak-2 Moscow
Lunyov 31'		Murushkin 37'; Kuzmichyov 38'

Spartak Manege, Moscow
Attendance: 300
Referee: Ihor Horozhankin (Ukraine)

26 January 1999
17:00

Yelimay Semipalatinsk (Kazakhstan)	1 – 2	(Armenia) Tsement Ararat
Abildaev 42'		Voskanyan 35', 72'

Spartak Manege, Moscow
Attendance: 500
Referee: Andrei Butenko (Russia)
26 January 1999
19:00

Spartak-2 Moscow (Russia)	2 – 0	(Tajikistan) Varzob Dushanbe
Alyakrinsky 38'; Sosulin 72'

Spartak Manege, Moscow
Attendance: 300
Referee: Kurmanbek Ordabaev (Kazakhstan)

== Top Division ==
=== Group A ===
Team	Pld	W	D	L	GF	GA	GD	Pts
(Russia) Spartak Moscow	3	3	0	0	9	1	+8	9
(Lithuania) FBK Kaunas	3	2	0	1	4	3	+1	6
(Belarus) Dnepr-Transmash Mogilev	3	1	0	2	6	8	−2	3
(Georgia (country)) Dinamo Tbilisi	3	0	0	3	4	11	−7	0

- Georgia relegated to First Division

==== Results ====
23 January 1999
13:00

FBK Kaunas (Lithuania)	2 – 0	(Georgia (country)) Dinamo Tbilisi
Petrenko 3' (pen.); Trakys 34'

CSKA Palace of Sports, Moscow
Attendance: 1,000
Referee: Sergei Khusainov (Russia)
23 January 1999
15:00

Spartak Moscow (Russia)	3 – 0	(Belarus) Dnepr-Transmash Mogilev
Khlestov 18'; Tikhonov 65' (pen.); Titov 82'

CSKA Palace of Sports, Moscow
Attendance: 4,000
Referee: Oleg Timofejev (Estonia)

24 January 1999
15:00

Dinamo Tbilisi (Georgia (country))	1 – 4	(Russia) Spartak Moscow
Shengelia 18'		Tikhonov 3'; Yuran 44'; Bezrodny 67'; Robson 90'

CSKA Palace of Sports, Moscow
Attendance: 4,300
Referee: Algirdas Dubinskas (Lithuania)
24 January 1999
19:00

Dnepr-Transmash Mogilev (Belarus)	1 – 2	(Lithuania) FBK Kaunas
Lukashov 15'		Laurišas 3'; Trakys 65'

CSKA Palace of Sports, Moscow
Attendance: 150
Referee: Kadyrbek Chynybekov (Kyrgyzstan)

26 January 1999
15:00

Dinamo Tbilisi (Georgia (country))	3 – 5	(Belarus) Dnepr-Transmash Mogilev
Asatiani 12'; Mikadze 23'; Shengelia 35'		Lanko 14'; Aharodnik 17', 44'; Chumachenko 36', 90'

CSKA Palace of Sports, Moscow
Attendance: 300
Referee: Yuri Baskakov (Russia)
26 January 1999
19:00

Spartak Moscow (Russia)	2 – 0	(Lithuania) FBK Kaunas
Baranov 26'; Tikhonov 30' (pen.)

CSKA Palace of Sports, Moscow
Attendance: 3,800
Referee: Rahmon Murtazayev (Tajikistan)

=== Group B ===
Team	Pld	W	D	L	GF	GA	GD	Pts
(Ukraine) Dynamo Kyiv	3	2	1	0	7	3	+4	7
(Latvia) Skonto Riga	3	2	0	1	16	5	+11	6
(Azerbaijan) Kapaz Ganja	3	1	1	1	2	4	−2	4
(Turkmenistan) Köpetdag Aşgabat	3	0	0	3	1	14	−13	0

- Turkmenistan relegated to First Division

==== Results ====
23 January 1999
17:00

Dynamo Kyiv (Ukraine)	4 – 3	(Latvia) Skonto Riga
Serebrennikov 39', 59'; Kormiltsev 47'; Mykhaylenko 52'		Miholaps 12', 27'; Bleidelis 78'

CSKA Palace of Sports, Moscow
Attendance: 3,000
Referee: Oleg Chikun (Belarus)
23 January 1999
19:00

Köpetdag Aşgabat (Turkmenistan)	0 – 2	(Azerbaijan) Kapaz Ganja
		Mardanov 29'; Sadigov 69'

CSKA Palace of Sports, Moscow
Attendance: 1,000
Referee: Andrei Iacovlev (Moldova)

24 January 1999
13:00

Skonto Riga (Latvia)	9 – 1	(Turkmenistan) Köpetdag Aşgabat
Rekhviashvili 22', 55'; Pahars 27', 63'; Bleidelis 39', 52'; Miholaps 61', 72'; Melnyk 77'		Agaýew 45'

CSKA Palace of Sports, Moscow
Attendance: 1,000
Referee: Andrei Butenko (Russia)
24 January 1999
17:00

Kapaz Ganja (Azerbaijan)	0 – 0	(Ukraine) Dynamo Kyiv

CSKA Palace of Sports, Moscow
Attendance: 3,000
Referee: Romāns Lajuks (Latvia)

26 January 1999
13:00

Skonto Riga (Latvia)	4 – 0	(Azerbaijan) Kapaz Ganja
Pahars 51'; Astafjevs 56', 76'; Solovyov 86'

CSKA Palace of Sports, Moscow
Attendance: 1,500
Referee: Sergei Khusainov (Russia)
26 January 1999
17:00

Dynamo Kyiv (Ukraine)	3 – 0	(Turkmenistan) Köpetdag Aşgabat
U.Makowski 12', 45'; Kosyrin 81'

CSKA Palace of Sports, Moscow
Attendance: 3,500
Referee: Oleg Timofejev (Estonia)

== Final rounds ==
=== Semifinal ===
- Two results carried over from the first round: Dynamo v Skonto 4–3 and Spartak v Kaunas 2–0

Team	Pld	W	D	L	GF	GA	GD	Pts
(Russia) Spartak Moscow	3	2	1	0	5	1	+4	7
(Ukraine) Dynamo Kyiv	3	1	2	0	4	3	+1	5
(Latvia) Skonto Riga	3	1	0	2	8	8	0	3
(Lithuania) FBK Kaunas	3	0	1	2	1	6	−5	1

==== Results ====
27 January 1999
16:30

FBK Kaunas (Lithuania)	0 – 0	(Ukraine) Dynamo Kyiv

CSKA Palace of Sports, Moscow
Attendance: 3,000
Referee: Kurmanbek Ordabaev (Kazakhstan)
27 January 1999
19:00

Spartak Moscow (Russia)	3 – 1	(Latvia) Skonto Riga
Bezrodny 18', 89'; Robson 54'		Bleidelis 57'

CSKA Palace of Sports, Moscow
Attendance: 3,000
Referee: Khagani Mamedov (Azerbaijan)

29 January 1999
16:30

Skonto Riga (Latvia)	4 – 1	(Lithuania) FBK Kaunas
Dedura 17' (o.g.); Miholaps 21', 38', 80'		Karvelis 84'

CSKA Palace of Sports, Moscow
Attendance: 750
Referee: Sergo Kvaratskhelia (Georgia)
29 January 1999
19:00

Dynamo Kyiv (Ukraine)	0 – 0	(Russia) Spartak Moscow

CSKA Palace of Sports, Moscow
Attendance: 4,000
Referee: Romāns Lajuks (Latvia)

=== Final ===
31 January 1999
16:00

Spartak Moscow (Russia)	2 – 1	(Ukraine) Dynamo Kyiv
Melyoshin 61'; Titov 89'		Byalkevich 48'

Olympic Sport Complex, Moscow
Attendance: 20,000
Referee: Andrei Iacovlev (Moldova)

== Top scorers ==
Rank	Player	Team	Goals
1	(Latvia) Mihails Miholaps	(Latvia) Skonto Riga	7
2	(Latvia) Imants Bleidelis	(Latvia) Skonto Riga	4
3	(Russia) Andrey Tikhonov	(Russia) Spartak Moscow	3
3	(Russia) Artyom Bezrodny	(Russia) Spartak Moscow	3
3	(Latvia) Marians Pahars	(Latvia) Skonto Riga	3
3	(Armenia) Artur Voskanyan	(Armenia) Tsement Ararat	3
