= Tajik football league system =

Tajikistan has its system of football leagues. There are four levels of football leagues in Tajikistan.

Level	Leagues				
1	Tajikistan Higher League; 10 clubs				
2	Tajikistan First League; 13 clubs				
3	Tajikistan Second League				
3	Dushanbe	Sughd Region	Khatlon Region	Districts of Republican Subordination	Gorno-Badakhshan Autonomous Region
4	Tajikistan Regional Leagues				
4	Dushanbe	Sughd Region	Khatlon Region	Districts of Republican Subordination	Gorno-Badakhshan Autonomous Region
5	Tajikistan city and district Championships				

== External links and sources ==
- Tajikistan Football League Organization official website
- Tajikistan Football Federation official website
- В ДОБРЫЙ ПУТЬ, ЧЕМПИОНАТ ТАДЖИКИСТАНА-2017!
