= Sukhrob Khamidov =

Tajikistani footballer

Sukhrob Hamidov
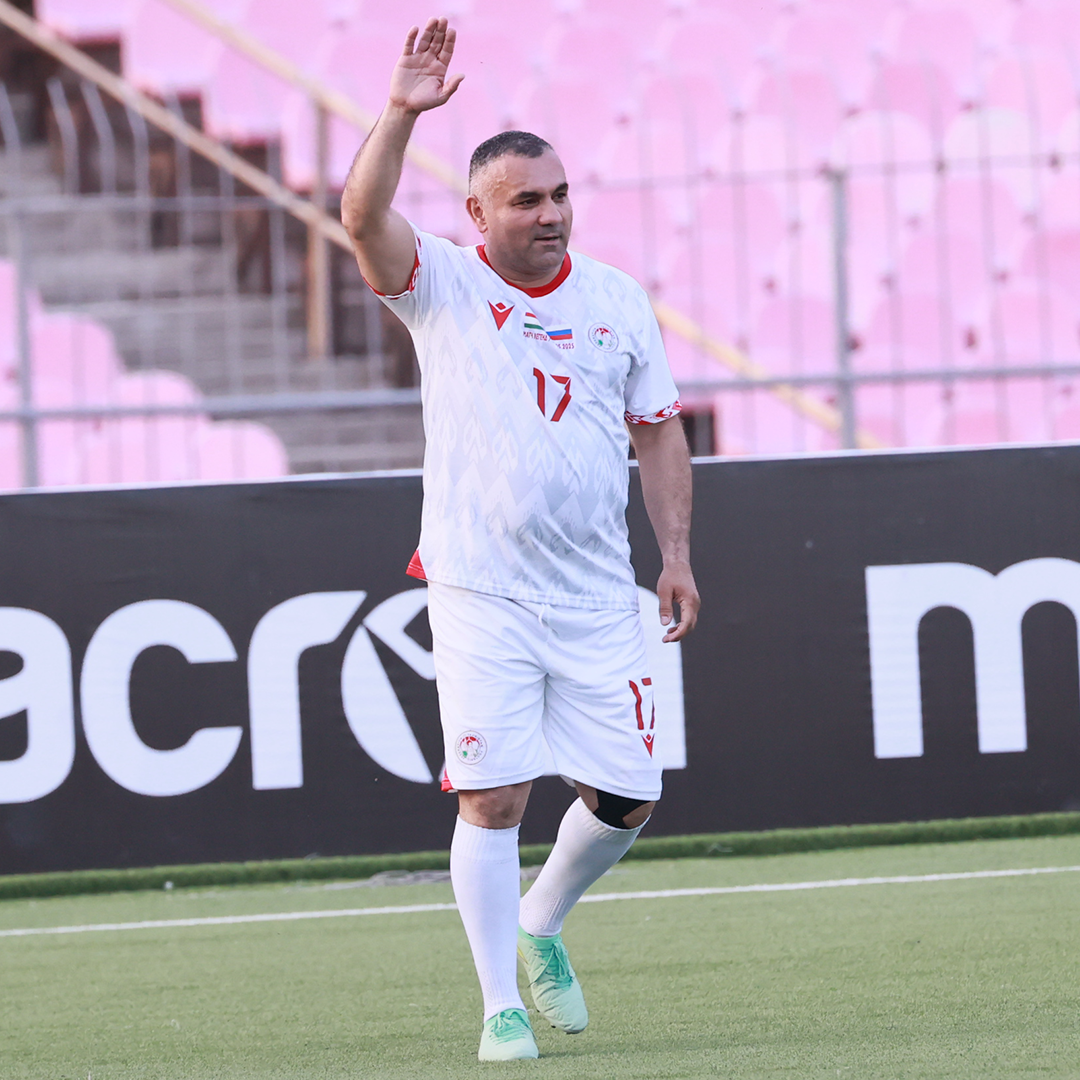
- Image of Суҳроб Ҳамидов

Personal information
- Full name: Sukhrob Hamidov
- Date of birth: 30 January 1977 (age 49)
- Place of birth: Dushanbe, Tajik SSR
- Height: 1.81 m (5 ft 11 in)
- Position: Forward

Senior career*
Years	Team	Apps	(Gls)
1993–1996	Bofanda Dushanbe		
1997	Shakhtyor Soligorsk	8	(0)
1998–1999	Varzob Dushanbe		(20)
2000–2002	Shakhtyor Soligorsk	52	(7)
2002	BDA Dushanbe		
2003	Ekibastuzets	24	(3)
2004–2005	Regar-TadAZ Tursunzoda		(44)
2006–2007	Hima Dushanbe		(21)
2007	Regar-TadAZ Tursunzoda		
2008–2009	Energetik Dushanbe		

International career
1996–2004	Tajikistan	14	(5)
- * Club domestic league appearances and goals

Sukhrob Hamidov (born 14 August 1975) is a retired Tajikistan footballer who played as a forward.

== Career statistics ==
=== International ===
Tajikistan
Year	Apps	Goals
1996	1	0
1997	0	0
1998	0	0
1999	3	0
2000	2	4
2001	0	0
2002	0	0
2003	7	1
2004	1	0
Total	14	5

Statistics accurate as of match played 11 September 2015

== Honours ==
=== Club ===
Varzob Dushanbe

- Tajik League (2): 1998, 1999
- Tajik Cup (2): 1998, 1999

Regar-TadAZ

- Tajik League (2): 2004, 2007
- Tajik Cup (1): 2005

=== Individual ===
- Tajik League Top Goalscorer 2004: 33
- Tajik League Top Goalscorer 2007: 21
