= Mukhsin Mukhamadiev =

Tajik and Russian footballer (1966–2026)

Personal information
- Date of birth: 21 October 1966
- Place of birth: Dushanbe, Tajik SSR, Soviet Union
- Date of death: 1 January 2026 (aged 59)
- Place of death: Moscow, Russia
- Height: 1.72 m (5 ft 8 in)
- Position: Striker

Senior career*
Years	Team	Apps	(Gls)
1983	Pomir Dushanbe		
1983–1984	Pakhtakor	33	(5)
1985–1992	Pomir Dushanbe	207	(72)
1992–1993	Lokomotiv Moscow	41	(12)
1993–1994	Ankaragücü	29	(4)
1994–1995	Spartak Moscow	30	(13)
1996–1997	Lokomotiv Nizhny Novgorod	57	(17)
1997–1998	Austria Wien	13	(0)
1998	Torpedo Moscow	14	(2)
1999	Shinnik Yaroslavl	11	(1)
1999	Buxoro	7	(7)
2000–2001	Dinamo Samarqand	45	(41)
2001	Arsenal Tula	15	(3)
2002	Vityaz Podolsk	25	(2)
2003	Regar-TadAZ Tursunzoda		
2003	Troitsk		
Total		527+	(179+)

International career
1992	Tajikistan	1	(2)
1995	Russia	1	(1)

Managerial career
- 2003–2005: Vityaz Podolsk (coach)
- 2006–2008: Vityaz Podolsk
- 2008–2012: Rubin Kazan (sporting director)
- 2013–2015: Tajikistan
- 2016: Ordabasy (assistant coach)
- 2016–2018: Istiklol
- 2019–2020: Buxoro
- * Club domestic league appearances and goals

Mukhsin Muslimovich Mukhamadiev (Tajik: Мӯҳсин Муҳаммадиев; Russian: Мухсин Муслимович Мухаммадиев; 21 October 1966 – 1 January 2026) was a Tajik-Russian football player and coach. Born in the Tajik SSR, he represented both Tajikistan and Russia in the 90s.

== Playing career ==
=== Club career ===
Born in Dushanbe, Mukhamadiev played club football as a striker for Pomir Dushanbe, Pakhtakor, Lokomotiv Moscow, Ankaragücü, Spartak Moscow, Lokomotiv Nizhny Novgorod, Austria Wien, Torpedo Moscow, Shinnik Yaroslavl, Buxoro, Dinamo Samarqand, Arsenal Tula and Vityaz Podolsk. The highlight of his club career came when he scored the winning goal for Spartak against Dynamo Kyiv in a Champions League group game in Moscow on 23 November 1994.

=== International career ===
Mukhamadiev represented both Tajikistan and Russia at international level. He scored a goal on his only appearance for Russia, in a Euro 96 qualifying game against the Faroe Islands in Moscow on 6 May 1995.

== Coaching career ==
After retiring from playing at Vityaz Podolsk in 2002, Mukhamadiev was appointed one of the club coaches in 2003, before being appointed manager in 2006. Mukhamadiev managed Vityaz Podolski until 2008 before joining Rubin Kazan as sporting director until 2012. In July 2013, Mukhamadiev was appointed manager of the Tajikistan national team, managing them for two-years before resigning on 16 July 2015. After leaving his post with Tajikistan, Mukhamadiev was part of Bakhtiyar Bayseitov's coaching staff at Ordabasy for the first half of the 2016 season. On 31 October 2016, Mukhamadiev was appointed manager of FC Istiklol for the 2017 season. On 18 September 2017, Mukhamadiev led Istiklol to their sixth Tajik League title with a 5–0 victory over Panjshir. After being knocked out of the 2018 AFC Cup at the group stage, manager Mukhamadiev resigned as manager of FC Istiklol six-days later on 22 May 2018, with Alisher Tukhtaev being appointed acting head coach.

On 9 June 2019, Mukhamadiev was appointed manager of Uzbekistan Super League club FK Buxoro.

== Death ==
Mukhamadiev died in Moscow, Russia on 1 January 2026, at the age of 59.

== Career statistics ==
=== International ===
Appearances and goals by national team and year
National team	Year	Apps	Goals
Tajikistan
Tajikistan	1992	1	2
Total		1	2
Russia
Russia	1995	1	1
Total		1	1

=== Managerial ===
As of match played 30 September 2019 Only competitive matches are counted.

Team	From	To	P	W	D	L	GS	GA	%W	Honours	Notes
Tajikistan	Jul 2013	16 July 2015	10	4	1	5	17	18	40.00		
Istiklol	1 January 2017	22 May 2018	52	37	10	5	129	47	71.15	Tajik League (1), Tajik Supercup (1)	
Buxoro	9 June 2019		14	3	3	8	12	32	21.43		

== Honours ==
Spartak Moscow

- Russian Top League: 1994

Regar-TadAZ Tursunzoda

- Tajik League: 2003
