= Khodzhayev =

Khodzhayev, Khodzhaev, Khojayev or Khojaev (Uzbek: Xo‘jayev; Russian: Ходжаев) is an Asian masculine surname, its feminine counterpart is Khodzhayeva, Khodzhaeva, Khojaeva or Khojaeva. It may refer to

- Fayzulla Xoʻjayev (1896–1938), Uzbek politician
- Mo'ina Khojaeva (born 1941), Uzbekistani Tajik poet and short story writer
- Rustam Khojayev (born 1973), Tajik footballer
- Sukhrob Khodzhayev (born 1993), Uzbek Olympic hammer thrower
