= Rustam Usmonov =

Tajikistani footballer (born 1977)

Personal information
- Full name: Rustam Usmonov
- Date of birth: 30 January 1977 (age 49)
- Height: 1.75 m (5 ft 9 in)
- Position: Forward

Senior career*
Years	Team	Apps	(Gls)
1996–1997	Vakhsh Qurghonteppa		
1998–1999	Kairat	30	(11)
2000	Access-Golden Grain	12	(2)
2001	Regar-TadAZ		
2002–2004	Irtysh Pavlodar	66	(15)
2005–2007	Zhetysu	68	(40)
2008	Energetik Pavlodar	15	(1)
2009–2012	Vakhsh Qurghonteppa		

International career^{‡}
2000	Tajikistan	2	(1)
- * Club domestic league appearances and goals as of 11 September 2015 ‡ National team caps and goals as of 11 September 2015

Rustam Usmonov (born 30 January 1977) is a retired Tajikistani footballer who played as a forward.

== Career statistics ==
=== International ===
Tajikistan
Year	Apps	Goals
2000	2	1
Total	2	1

Statistics accurate as of match played 11 September 2015

=== International goals ===
Scores and results list Tajikistan's goal tally first.

#	Date	Venue	Opponent	Score	Result	Competition	Ref.
1	26 November 2000	Takhti Stadium, Tabriz, Iran	Guam	15–0	16–0	2002 FIFA World Cup qualification	

== Honours ==
Vakhsh Qurghonteppa

- Tajik League: 1997, 2009
- Tajik Cup: 1997

Regar-TadAZ

- Tajik League: 2001
- Tajik Cup: 2001

Irtysh Pavlodar

- Kazakhstan Premier League: 2002, 2003
