= Olimi Karimzod Mastchoh =

- Full name: Olimi Karimzod Mastchoh
- Dissolved: 2007; 19 years ago
- League: Tajik League
- 2006: 9th

Olimi Karimzod (Tajik: Олими Каримзод) was football club from Mastchoh, Tajikistan. Olimi Karimzod played in the 2006 Tajik League (the top-level football division in the country), finishing in ninth place. As of 2006 the team was headed by Alibek Amirbekov. The home stadium of the team was the Nazar Nazirov Stadium. The club later went bankrupt.

== League and domestic cup history ==
| Season | League | | | | | | | | | Tajik Cup | Top goalscorer | | Manager |
| Season | Div. | Pos. | Pl. | W | D | L | GS | GA | P | Tajik Cup | Name | League | Manager |
|---|---|---|---|---|---|---|---|---|---|---|---|---|---|
| 2006 | 1st | 9th | 22 | 5 | 4 | 13 | 22 | 39 | 19 | | | | |
