= Uraz Turakulov =

Tajikistani football coach

Personal information
- Full name: Uraz Turakulov
- Date of birth: January 28, 1963 (age 63)
- Place of birth: USSR

Managerial career
- Years: Team
- 1997–2008: Vakhsh Qurghonteppa

Uraz Turakulov (born January 28, 1963, Tajikistan) is a Tajikistani football coach.

== Coaching career ==
As one of the most successful coaches from Tajikistan, he won the Tajik League twice with Vakhsh Qurghonteppa in 1997 and 2005; also won Tajik Cup in 1997 and 2008. He also achieved Runner Up in AFC President's Cup in 2006.

== Honours ==
- Merited Coach of the Republic of Tajikistan
- Best Coach of Tajikistan (2003, 2005)
- Tajik League Champion: 1997, 2005
- Tajik Cup Champion: 1997, 2008
- AFC President's Cup Runner Up: 2006
