= Tajikistan First League =

Tajikistan First League Лигаи Якуми Тоҷикистон
- Organising body: Tajikistan Football League Organization, Tajikistan Football Federation
- Founded: 1992; 34 years ago 2004; 22 years ago (refounded)
- Country: Tajikistan
- Confederation: AFC
- Number of clubs: 13
- Level on pyramid: 2
- Promotion to: Tajikistan Higher League
- Relegation to: Tajikistan Second League
- Domestic cup: Tajikistan Cup
- Most championships: Sarayqamar (3 titles)
- Broadcaster(s): TFF Futbol, Varzish TV
- Website: tfl.tj fft.tj
- Current: 2026 Tajikistan First League

The Ligai Yakumi Tojikiston (Tajik: Лигаи Якуми Тоҷикистон; Russian: Первая лига Таджикистана), or Tajikistan First League is a football league in Tajikistan, the second level of importance after the Tajikistan Higher League.

It is operated under the auspices of the Tajikistan Football League Organization and rebranded Tajikistan Football Federation. The Tajikistan First League was founded in 2004. According to previous reports, Tajikistan's First League was founded in 1992, as well as many "First Leagues" of other Post-Soviet countries.

== Format ==
12 clubs participate in the Tajikistan First League. The winner of the Tajikistan First League receives a ticket to the Tajikistan Higher League (The winner of the First League is allowed to participate in the Higher League after obtaining a license and fulfilling certain obligations. Otherwise the club remains in the First League), and the club who took second place will play play off matches with the club who took seventh place in the Tajikistan Higher League. The winner of the playoffs is eligible to participate in the Higher League, and the losing club will start the next season in the First League. Clubs who have taken the last place in the First League are not always relegated from the First League. It depends on the capabilities (Finance, License) of the club next season. Usually the clubs that took the last place in the First League is relegated to the Tajikistan Second League. Their place is taken by the best team from the Tajikistan Second League.

In 2024, 13 teams started in the Parimatch Ligai Jakum.

== Winners ==
Season	Winner
2003	FC Danghara
2004	Hima Dushanbe
2005	Oriyono Dushanbe
2006	Energetik Dushanbe
2007	Ravshan Kulob
2008	Istiklol Dushanbe
2009	Saroykamar Panj
2010	RTSU Dushanbe
2011	Zarafshon Panjakent
2012	Panjsher Balkh
2013	Saroykamar Panj
2014	Saroykamar Panj
2015	Hosilot Farkhor
2016	Panjsher Balkh
2017	Kuktosh Rudaki
2018	FC Istaravshan
2019	Lokomotiv-Pomir Dushanbe
2020	Ravshan Kulob
2021	Regar-TadAZ Tursunzoda
2022	Hosilot Farkhor
2023	Panjsher Balkh
2024	Hulbuk Vose
2025	Parvoz Bobojon Ghafurov
