= 2021 Tajikistan First League =

Tajikistan First League
- Season: 2021
- Dates: 24 April –

The Tajikistan First League is the second division of the Tajikistan Football Federation.

== Season events ==
On 13 April, the Tajikistan Football Federation announced the 12 teams that would participate in this seasons competition.

== Teams ==
Team	Location	Venue	Capacity
Barkchi	Hisor	Central Stadium	20,000
Dynamo	Dushanbe	Dynamo Stadium	4,000
Hulbuk Vose	Hulbuk		
Isfara	Isfara		
Khayr	Vahdat	Khair Stadium	8,000
Khosilot	Farkhor		
Mohir	Yovon		
Pakhtakor	Jabbor Rasulov		
Panjsher	Balkh	Panjshir Uktam Mamatova Stadium	8,500
Ravshan	Zafarobod		
Regar-TadAZ	Tursunzoda	TALCO Arena	10,000
Saroykamar Panj	Panj		

== League table ==
Pos	Team	Pld	W	D	L	GF	GA	GD	Pts	Qualification or relegation
1	Regar-TadAZ	22	18	4	0	70	22	+48	58	Promotion to the 2022 Tajikistan Higher League
2	Ravshan Zafarobod	22	16	3	3	60	18	+42	51	Promotion to the 2022 Tajikistan Higher League
3	Khosilot Farkhor	22	15	4	3	43	21	+22	49	
4	Hulbuk Vose	22	13	5	4	43	21	+22	44	
5	Dynamo Dushanbe	22	12	4	6	71	22	+49	40	
6	Barkchi	22	6	7	9	35	33	+2	25	
7	Panjshir	22	6	6	10	32	32	0	24	
8	Saroykamar Panj	22	6	5	11	32	48	−16	23	
9	Pakhtakor	22	5	4	13	40	59	−19	19	
10	Khayr Vahdat	22	3	6	13	19	57	−38	15	
11	Mohir	22	3	4	15	22	63	−41	13	
12	Isfara	22	2	2	18	16	87	−71	8	

Updated to match(es) played on 21 October 2021. Source: FFT
Rules for classification: 1) Points; 2) Head-to-head points; 3) Head-to-head goal difference; 4) Head-to-head goals scored; 5) Goal difference; 6) Goals scored.
