= Eskhata Khujand =

Association football club in Tajikistan

Eskhata
- Full name: Eskhata Khujand
- Ground: Spartak Stadium Khujand
- Capacity: 1,000
- Manager: Igor Surov
- League: Tajikistan Higher League
- 2025: Tajikistan Higher League, 6th of 12
Home colours	Away colours

Eskhata Khujand is a professional football club based in Khujand, Tajikistan. They currently play in the Tajikistan Higher League.

== History ==
Formerly known as FC Dushanbe-83, the club earned promotion to the Tajikistan Higher League for the first time in 2019, after finishing second in the 2020 Tajikistan First League.

=== Domestic history ===
Season	League									Tajik Cup	Top goalscorer		Manager
Season	Div.	Pos.	Pl.	W	D	L	GS	GA	P	Tajik Cup	Name	League	Manager
2019	2nd	5th	26	15	5	6	62	45	50	Quarterfinal	(Tajikistan) Juraboy Isoev	16	
2020	2nd	2nd	22	16	1	5	59	32	49	Quarterfinal	(Tajikistan) Mubindzhon Muminov	6	
2021	1st	6th	27	9	3	15	33	49	30	Semifinal	(Uzbekistan) Akobir Turaev	9	
2022	1st	7th	22	7	6	9	29	32	27	Semifinal	(Uzbekistan) Sanjar Rihsiboev	7	(Tajikistan) Khamid Karimov
2023	1st	4th	22	10	3	9	30	32	33	Quarterfinal	(Tajikistan) Bakhtiyor Zaripov	8	(Russia) Igor Surov
2024	1st	6th	22	10	5	7	34	31	35	Last 16	(Tajikistan) Jahongir Ergashev	10	(Russia) Igor Surov

== Current squad ==
As of 9 March 2026

Note: Flags indicate national team as defined under FIFA eligibility rules; some limited exceptions apply. Players may hold more than one non-FIFA nationality.

No.	Pos.	Nation	Player
2	DF	TJK	Sohibjon Khakimov
4	DF	TJK	Abdurakhmon Uzokov
6	MF	TJK	Abdusamad Samadov
7	MF	UZB	Sanzhar Rikhsiboev
8	DF	TJK	Rustamjon Saburov
10	MF	UZB	Bekzod Sayidov
11	FW	TJK	Bakhtiyor Zaripov
14	FW	UZB	Samandar Kodirov
16	GK	TJK	Mumindzhon Gadoyboev
17	MF	TJK	Ibrohim Eshonkhonov
19	DF	TJK	Amirjon Rakhimov

No.	Pos.	Nation	Player
21	DF	UZB	Firdavs Chakalov
22	MF	TJK	Khodzhiboy Ziyoyev
23	DF	TJK	Dilshojon Karimov
31	GK	UZB	Izzatullo Tursunov
44	DF	UZB	Sergey Prokhorov
63	MF	TJK	Diyorbek Kholmirzoev
72	MF	TJK	Mubinjon Muminov
77	FW	TJK	Jakhongir Akparzoda
81	MF	TJK	Khodzhi Abdumanon
99	MF	TJK	Bohirjon Sanginboyev
