= Oraz Nazarov =

Tajikistani footballer (born 1970)

Personal information
- Full name: Oraz Sharifovich Nazarov
- Date of birth: 3 February 1970 (age 56)
- Place of birth: Soviet Union
- Height: 1.75 m (5 ft 9 in)
- Position: Midfielder

Youth career
- 1987–1990: CSKA Pamir Dushanbe

Senior career*
Years	Team	Apps	(Gls)
1988–1991	CSKA Pamir Dushanbe		
1992	CSKA Pamir Dushanbe		
1992–1994	Fortuna Düsseldorf		
1994	Navbahor Namangan		
1994–1995	Fortuna Düsseldorf		
1995	Navbahor Namangan		
1995	MHSK Tashkent		
1997	Kosonsoy		
1999–2000	Varzob Dushanbe		
2001	Spartak Semey	24	(1)
2002	Farrukh		
2005	Parvoz Bobojon Ghafurov		

International career
1992–2003	Tajikistan	12	(2)

Managerial career
- 2005: Parvoz Bobojon Ghafurov (coach)
- 2006: Hima (coach)
- 2008: Pamir GBAO (coach)
- 2009–2011: Regar-TadAZ (coach)
- 2011: Tajikistan U-19 (coach)
- 2014: Antizenhofen (coach)
- * Club domestic league appearances and goals

Oraz Nazarov (Tajik: Ораз Назаров; born 3 February 1970) is a Tajikistani former footballer who played as a midfielder. He made 12 appearances for the Tajikistan national team, scoring twice.

== Career statistics ==
Tajikistan national team
Year	Apps	Goals
1992	2	1
1993	0	0
1994	0	0
1995	0	0
1996	0	0
1997	0	0
1998	0	0
1999	2	1
2000	0	0
2001	0	0
2002	0	0
2003	8	0
Total	20	0

Statistics accurate as of 15 February 2017

#	Date	Venue	Opponent	Score	Result	Competition
1	1992					
2	5 August 1999	Central Republican Stadium, Dushanbe	Kyrgyzstan	3–1	3–2	2000 AFC Asian Cup qualification

== Honours ==
Pamir Dushanbe

- Tajikistan Higher League: 1992
- Tajikistan Cup: 1992

Varzob Dushanbe

- Tajikistan Higher League: 1999, 2000
- Tajikistan Cup]]: 1999
