= Tajikistan Second League =

Tajikistan Second League Лигаи Дуввуми Тоҷикистон
- Organising body: Tajikistan Football League Organization, Tajikistan Football Federation
- Founded: 1992; 34 years ago
- Country: Tajikistan
- Confederation: AFC
- Level on pyramid: 3
- Promotion to: Tajikistan First League
- Relegation to: Tajikistan Regional Leagues
- Domestic cup: Tajikistan Cup
- Broadcaster(s): TFF Futbol, Varzish TV
- Website: tfl.tj, fft.tj

The Ligai Duvvumi Tojikiston (Tajik: Лигаи Дуввуми Тоҷикистон; Russian: Вторая лига Таджикистана), or Tajikistan Second League is a football league in Tajikistan, at the third level of importance.

It is operated under the auspices of the Tajikistan Football League Organization and Tajikistan Football Federation. The year of foundation of the Tajikistan First League is 1992.

The Tajikistan Second League is held in the form of regional tournaments. The winners of these regional tournaments will be able to play in the Tajikistan First League next season. In some seasons, the winners of zonal tournaments play with each other, and the strongest club or clubs get a ticket to the First League.

Regional zones of the Tajikistan Second League:

Zone	Region of country	Map
Badakhshan	Kuhistoni Badakhshon Autonomous Region	
Center and Rasht	Districts of Republican Subordination	
Dushanbe and surrounding area	Dushanbe	Dushanbe
Sughd	Sughd Region	Sughd Region
Khatlon	Khatlon Region	Khatlon Province
