= 2024 Tajikistan Cup =

Football competition in Tajikistan

Tournament details
- Country: Tajikistan
- Dates: 10 May 2024 – 20 October 2024

Final positions
- Champions: Regar-TadAZ
- Runners-up: Khujand
- Champions League Two: Regar-TadAZ
- All statistics correct as of 20 October 2024.

The 2024 Tajikistan Cup was the 33rd edition of the Tajikistan Cup, the knockout football tournament of Tajikistan, with the winner of the cup qualifying for the 2025–26 AFC Champions League Two Qualifying play-off. In the final, Regar-TadAZ defeated Khujand 2–1.

Officially named the 1XBet Çomi Toçikiston due to sponsorship from 1xBet, the tournament is organized by the Football Federation of Tajikistan and open to clubs across 2 divisions.

The winners will play the 2025 Tajikistan Super Cup against the 2024 Tajikistan Championship winners.

== Preliminary rounds ==
All times are local (UTC+05:00)

=== First round ===
10 May 2024	FC Hulbuk	4–0	FC Sarhadchi	Tajikistan
16:00		Report

=== Second round ===
22 May 2024	FC Sardor	2–2 (6–5 p)	FC Mokhir	Tursunzoda
16:30		Report		Stadium: TALKO-Arena

22 May 2024	FC Yokut	0–4	FK Fayzkand	Tajikistan
16:30		Report

=== Third round ===
29 May 2024	FC Hulbuk	3–5	FK Fayzkand	Tajikistan
16:30		Report

== Last 16 ==
27 July 2024 FirstLeg	Dushanbe	1–3	Istaravshan	Dushanbe
17:30 (UTC+5)	Akhliddin 83' (pen.)	Report	Fozilov 1'; Khasanov 22'; Abdulloev 26'	Stadium: CSKA Stadium of the Ministry of Defense of the Republic of Tatarstan; Attendance: 350; Referee: Kurbonmurod Sharipov

27 July 2024 First Leg	Kuktosh Rudaki	0–3	Vakhsh Bokhtar	Bokhtar
17:30 (UTC+5)		Report	Azizov 26'; Mwanengo 49'; Irgashev 84'	Stadium: Pakhtakor stadium Attendance: 2,500; Referee: Rustam Nurmatov

27 July 2024 First Leg	Barkchi Hisor	2–3	Regar-TadAZ	Dushanbe
19:00 (UTC+5)	Boboev 5', 47'	Report	Frimpong 25', 85' (pen.); Feumba 60'	Stadium: Pamir Stadium; Attendance: 300; Referee: Amirdzhon Khorkashev

28 July 2024 First Leg	Fayzkand	1–3	Khujand	Hulbuk
17:30 (UTC+5)	Aslonov 87' (pen.)	Report	Babadjanov 23'; Tumbas 32'; Serdyuk 63' (pen.)	Stadium: Tesh Ismoilov Stadium; Attendance: 350; Referee: Navruz Vohidov

28 July 2024 First Leg	Panjshir	0–6	Ravshan Kulob	Bokhtar
17:30 (UTC+5)		Report	Rakhimov 4', 38'; Khaitov 30'; Sultonov 62', 80'; Mirakhmadov 85'	Stadium: Pakhtakor stadium Attendance: 1,500; Referee: Gulmurodi Sadullo

28 July 2024 First leg	Istiklol	6–1	Eskhata	Dushanbe
19:00 (UTC+5)	Soirov 16'; M.Dzhalilov 56', 59' (pen.); Mabatshoev 65'; Madaminov 74'; Panjshanbe 84' (yellow card); A.Dzhalilov (yellow card)	Report	Imomnazarov 9'; Sharifi (yellow card)	Stadium: Pamir Stadium; Attendance: 500; Referee: Bakhtiyor Komilov

29 July 2024 First Leg	Khosilot Farkhor	0–1	CSKA Pamir Dushanbe	Farkhor
17:30 (UTC+5)		Report	Kholov 5'	Stadium: Central stadium Attendance: 4,000; Referee: Nasrullo Kabirov

29 July 2024 First Leg	Sardor	1–1	Shodmon	Tursunzoda
19:00 (UTC+5)	Ganiev 86'	Report	Isoev 42'	Stadium: TALCO Arena; Attendance: 1,000; Referee: Shakhboz Zardov

2 August 2024 Second Leg	Istaravshan	4–1 (7–2 agg.)	Dushanbe	Istaravshan
17:00 (UTC+5)	Bozorov 14', 52'; Meliev 66'; Abdulloev 76'	Report	Khudoydodov 25'	Stadium: Istaravshan-Arena; Attendance: 6,000; Referee: Shakhboz Zardov

2 August 2024 Second Leg	Regar-TadAZ	2–0 (5–2 agg.)	Barkchi Hisor	Tursunzoda
19:00 (UTC+5)	Azimov 26'; Mahamadiev 50'	Report		Stadium: TALCO Arena; Attendance: 1,220; Referee: Bakhtiyor Komilov

2 August 2024 Second Leg	Vakhsh Bokhtar	1–1 (4–1 agg.)	Kuktosh Rudaki	Bokhtar
17:00 (UTC+5)	Naskov 84'	Report	Roger 23'	Stadium: Pakhtakor stadium Attendance: 3,000; Referee: Abdullo Davlatov

2 August 2024 Second Leg	Khujand	10–0 (13–1 agg.)	Fayzkand	Khujand
17:00 (UTC+5)	Babadjanov 4', 25'; Karaev 12'; Serdyuk 23', 37'; Tumbas 56', 75', 90'; Sanginboev 62'; Toshpulatov 78'	Report		Stadium: 20 Years of Independence Stadium; Attendance: 4,000; Referee: Amirdzhon Khorkashev

3 August 2024 Second Leg	Ravshan Kulob	2–0 (8–0 agg.)	Panjshir	Kulob
19:00 (UTC+5)	Mirakhmadov 75'; Kodjo 90'	Report		Stadium: Langari Langarieva Stadium; Attendance: 7,000; Referee: Kurbonmurod Sharipov

3 August 2024 Second Leg	Shodmon	4–0 (5–1 agg.)	Sardor	Hisar
17:00 (UTC+5)	Burizod 33'; Uzbekzoda 69'; Salimzoda 75'; Isoev 77'	Report		Stadium: Giavoni stadium Attendance: 500; Referee: Rustam Nurmatov

4 August 2024 Second Leg	CSKA Pamir Dushanbe	2–0 (3–0 agg.)	Khosilot Farkhor	Tursunzoda
19:00 (UTC+5)	Isokdzhonov 20', 53'	Report		Stadium: TALCO Arena; Attendance: 450; Referee: Gulmurodi Sadullo

4 August 2024 Second leg	Eskhata	2–8 (3–14 agg.)	Istiklol	Dushanbe
20:00 (UTC+5)	Juraev 49'; Fatkhulloyev 65' (pen.)	Report	Margiotta 19', 26', 39'; Juraboev 19', 47'; A.Dzhalilov 31' (pen.); Mabatshoev 33'; Panjshanbe 36'	Stadium: Pamir Stadium; Attendance: 500; Referee: Navruz Vahidov

== Quarterfinals ==
23 August 2024 First Leg	Shodmon	0–1	Regar-TadAZ	Tursunzoda
(UTC+5)		Report	Kassim 25'	Stadium: TALCO Arena; Attendance: 750; Referee: Khurshed Dadoboev

23 August 2024 First Leg	Vakhsh Bokhtar	1–1	Khujand	Bokhtar
(UTC+5)	Khamrokulov 86'	Report	Tumbas 76'	Stadium: Pakhtakor Stadium; Attendance: 2,000; Referee: Amirdzhon Khorkashev

24 August 2024 First Leg	CSKA Pamir Dushanbe	0–1	Ravshan Kulob	Tursunzoda
(UTC+5)		Report	Rakhimov 7'	Stadium: TALCO Arena; Attendance: 300; Referee: Nasrullo Kabirov

25 August 2024 First leg	Istiklol	2–1	Istaravshan	Dushanbe
19:00 (UTC+5)	Madaminov 17'; Mitkov 42' (pen.); Davlatmir (yellow card); Juraboev (yellow card)	Report	Kholmurodov 84'; Kosimov (yellow card)	Stadium: Pamir Stadium; Attendance: 300; Referee: Abdullo Davlatov

29 August 2024 Second Leg	Khujand	2–1 (3–2 agg.)	Vakhsh Bokhtar	Khujand
16:00 (UTC+5)	Babadjanov 8'; D.Ergashev 59'	Report	Mwanengo 19'	Stadium: 20 Years of Independence Stadium

29 August 2024 Second Leg	Regar-TadAZ	5–2 (6–2 agg.)	Shodmon	Tursunzoda
18:00 (UTC+5)	Solehov 45+1' (pen.); Makhamadiev 53'; Kassim 67'; Elmurodov 73'; Frimpong 89'	Report	Joibov 41'; Uzbekzoda 78'	Stadium: TALCO Arena

30 August 2024 Second leg	Istaravshan	0–0 (1-2 agg.)	Istiklol	Istaravshan
16:00 (UTC+5)		Report	Bozorov (yellow card)	Stadium: Istaravshan-Arena; Attendance: 7,000; Referee: Nasrullo Kabirov

31 August 2024 Second Leg	Ravshan Kulob	0–0 (1–0 agg.)	CSKA Pamir Dushanbe	Kulab
18:00 (UTC+5)		Report		Stadium: Central Stadium

== Semifinals ==
24 September 2024 First Leg	Khujand	1–1	Ravshan Kulob	Khujand
16:00 (UTC+5)	Tsankyan 58'	Report	Safarov 60'	Stadium: 20 Years of Independence Stadium

24 September 2024 First leg	Istiklol	0–2	Regar-TadAZ	Dushanbe
21:00 (UTC+5)	M.Dzhalilov (yellow card); A.Dzhalilov (yellow card); Juraboev (yellow card); Souza (yellow card)	Report	Feumba 26' (yellow card); Frimpong 55'; Azimov (yellow card); Panny (yellow card); Bortey (yellow card)	Stadium: Pamir Stadium; Attendance: 1,200; Referee: Ravshan Ishmatov

10 October 2024 Second Leg	Ravshan Kulob	0–1 (1–2 agg.)	Khujand	Kulab
(UTC+5)	Makhsumov (red card) 30'	Report	Tumbas 80'	Stadium: Central Stadium; Attendance: 10,000; Referee: Nasrullo Kabirov

10 October 2024 Second leg	Regar-TadAZ	0–1 (2–1 agg.)	Istiklol	Tursunzoda
17:30 (UTC+5)	Kalandarov (yellow card); Azimov (yellow card); Frimpong (yellow card); Pani (yellow card); Panjiev (yellow card)	Report	Mabatshoev 22'; Soirov (yellow card); A.Dzhalilov (yellow card); Millar (yellow card)	Stadium: TALCO Arena; Attendance: 1,500; Referee: Sayodzhon Zayniddinov

== Final ==
20 October 2024
14:30 (UTC+5)

Regar-TadAZ	2–1	Khujand
Bikatal 11' (o.g.); Frimpong 17'	Report	Karaev 36' (pen.)

Istaravshan Sports Complex, Istaravshan
Attendance: 13,250
Referee: Sayodzhon Zayniddinov
