= Oriyono Dushanbe =

- Full name: Oriyono Dushanbe
- Dissolved: 2007; 18 years ago
- Ground: Dushanbe, Tajikistan
- League: Tajik League
- 2006: 11th

Oriyono Dushanbe was a football club based in Dushanbe in Tajikistan.

== History ==
In 2007, Oriyono Dushanbe merged with Dynamo Dushanbe, and took the later club's name.

=== Domestic history ===
Season	League									Tajik Cup	Top goalscorer		Manager
Season	Div.	Pos.	Pl.	W	D	L	GS	GA	P	Tajik Cup	Name	League	Manager
2003	1st	16th	30	3	3	24	18	89	12				
2006	1st	11th	22	3	4	15	25	53	13				
