= 2002 Tajik League =

Tajik League
- Season: 2002
- Champions: Regar-TadAZ
- Matches: 132
- Goals: 511 (3.87 per match)
- Top goalscorer: Dzhomikhon Mukhidinov (29)

Tajik League is the top division of the Tajikistan Football Federation, it was created in 1992. These are the statistics of the Tajik League in the 2002 season.

== Table ==
Pos	Team	Pld	W	D	L	GF	GA	GD	Pts
1	Regar-TadAZ (C)	22	19	1	2	75	28	+47	58
2	Khujand	22	17	2	3	76	17	+59	53
3	Farrukh Ghissar	22	13	5	4	45	25	+20	44
4	CSKA Pamir Dushanbe	22	12	7	3	57	25	+32	43
5	BDA Dushanbe	22	13	3	6	60	37	+23	42
6	Vakhsh Qurghonteppa	22	12	1	9	41	23	+18	37
7	Ansol Kulob	22	7	4	11	33	41	−8	25
8	Anicon Tursunzade	22	4	6	12	28	43	−15	18
9	Poisk Dushanbe	22	4	4	14	29	50	−21	16
10	Panjshir	22	4	4	14	29	76	−47	16
11	Umed Dushanbe	22	3	5	14	21	75	−54	14
12	Khoja Karimov Gazimalik	22	1	4	17	17	64	−47	7

Updated to match(es) played on 9 October 2015. Source: RSSF
Rules for classification: 1) points; 2) goal difference; 3) number of goals scored.
(C) Champions

== Top scorers ==
Rank	Player	Club	Goals
1	(Tajikistan) Dzhomikhon Mukhidinov	Khujand	29
2	(Tajikistan) Fuzailov	BDA	26
3	(Tajikistan) Zardov	Farrukh	16
