= 2020 Tajikistan First League =

Tajikistan First League
- Season: 2020
- Champions: Ravshan Kulob
- Promoted: Ravshan Kulob; Eskhata Khujand
- Matches played: 42
- Goals scored: 189 (4.5 per match)

The Tajikistan First League is the second division of the Tajikistan Football Federation.

== Season events ==
On 9 April, the Tajikistan Football Federation announced the 12 teams that would participate in this seasons competition.

== Teams ==
Team	Location	Venue	Capacity
Barkchi	Hisor	Central Stadium	
Eskhata Khujand	Khujand		
Hulbuk Vose	Hulbuk		
Isfara	Isfara		
Khayr Vahdat	Vahdat	Khair Stadium	
Khosilot Farkhor	Farkhar		
Mohir	Yovon		
Panjsher	Balkh		
Ravshan Kulob	Kulob	Central Stadium	
Ravshan Zafarobod	Zafarobod		
Saroykamar Panj	Panj		
Shohmansur Dushanbe	Dushanbe		

== League table ==
Pos	Team	Pld	W	D	L	GF	GA	GD	Pts	Qualification or relegation
1	Ravshan Kulob (C, P)	22	17	0	5	72	38	+34	51	Promotion to the 2021 Tajikistan Higher League
2	Eskhata Khujand (P)	22	16	1	5	59	32	+27	49	Promotion to the 2021 Tajikistan Higher League
3	Panjshir	22	12	5	5	63	27	+36	41	
4	Ravshan Zafarobod	22	11	6	5	47	28	+19	39	
5	Hulbuk Vose	22	11	3	8	42	36	+6	36	
6	Mohir	22	9	4	9	50	63	−13	31	
7	Khosilot Farkhor	22	9	3	10	38	39	−1	30	
8	Barkchi	22	9	1	12	40	39	+1	28	
9	Khayr Vahdat	22	7	5	10	48	40	+8	26	
10	Saroykamar Panj	22	7	5	10	42	49	−7	26	
11	Isfara	22	6	1	15	30	63	−33	19	
12	Shohmansur Dushanbe	22	0	2	20	13	90	−77	2	

Updated to match(es) played on 14 October 2020. Source: FFT
Rules for classification: 1) Points; 2) Head-to-head points; 3) Head-to-head goal difference; 4) Head-to-head goals scored; 5) Goal difference; 6) Goals scored.
(C) Champions; (P) Promoted

== Season statistics ==
=== Top scorers ===
As of match played 1 August 2020

Rank	Player	Club	Goals
1	(Tajikistan) Avaz Kamchinov	Hulbuk Vose	11
2	(Tajikistan) Firdavs Musoev	Isfara	7
3	(Tajikistan) Umedzhon Aziz	Khayr Vahdat	6
3	(Tajikistan) Amirdzhoni Farruhzod	Ravshan Kulob	6
3	(Tajikistan) Mubindzhon Muminov	Eskhata Khujand	6
