= Dmitri Borisov (footballer, born 1977) =

Russian footballer

Personal information
- Full name: Dmitri Viktorovich Borisov
- Date of birth: 25 July 1977 (age 49)
- Height: 1.90 m (6 ft 3 in)
- Position: Midfielder

Senior career*
Years	Team	Apps	(Gls)
1995–1999	Lokomotiv Moscow	0	(0)
1995–1998	→ Lokomotiv-d Moscow	109	(5)
1998	→ Gomel (loan)	4	(0)
1999	Shinnik Yaroslavl	1	(0)

International career
1999	Russia U-21	3	(0)
- * Club domestic league appearances and goals

Dmitri Viktorovich Borisov (Russian: Дмитрий Викторович Борисов; born 25 July 1977) is a Russian former football player.
