= 2007 Tajik League =

Tajik League
- Season: 2007
- Champions: Regar-TadAZ
- Matches: 110
- Goals: 372 (3.38 per match)
- Top goalscorer: Sukhrob Khamidov (21)

Tajik League is the top division of the Tajikistan Football Federation, it was created in 1992. These are the statistics of the Tajik League in the 2007 season.

== Table ==
| Pos | Team | Pld | W | D | L | GF | GA | GD | Pts |
|---|---|---|---|---|---|---|---|---|---|
| 1 | Regar-TadAZ (C) | 20 | 18 | 1 | 1 | 61 | 14 | +47 | 55 |
| 2 | Parvoz Bobojon Ghafurov | 20 | 17 | 0 | 3 | 52 | 10 | +42 | 51 |
| 3 | Vakhsh Qurghonteppa | 20 | 11 | 4 | 5 | 26 | 16 | +10 | 37 |
| 4 | Tajik Telecom Qurghonteppa | 20 | 11 | 4 | 5 | 44 | 23 | +21 | 37 |
| 5 | Hima Dushanbe | 20 | 9 | 6 | 5 | 39 | 27 | +12 | 33 |
| 6 | Khujand | 20 | 8 | 3 | 9 | 27 | 37 | −10 | 27 |
| 7 | CSKA Pamir Dushanbe | 20 | 7 | 1 | 12 | 34 | 44 | −10 | 22 |
| 8 | Dynamo Dushanbe | 20 | 6 | 4 | 10 | 33 | 38 | −5 | 22 |
| 9 | Energetik Dushanbe | 20 | 5 | 3 | 12 | 24 | 40 | −16 | 18 |
| 10 | Guardia Dushanbe | 20 | 1 | 3 | 16 | 13 | 52 | −39 | 6 |
| 11 | Saroykamar Panj | 20 | 1 | 3 | 16 | 19 | 71 | −52 | 6 |

Updated to match(es) played on 13 October 2015. Source: RSSF
Rules for classification: 1) points; 2) goal difference; 3) number of goals scored.
(C) Champions

== Top scorers ==
| Rank | Player | Club | Goals |
|---|---|---|---|
| 1 | (Tajikistan) Sukhrob Khamidov | Hima Dushanbe | 21 |
| 2 | (Tajikistan) Numon Hakimov | Parvoz Bobojon Ghafurov | 20 |
| 3 | (Uzbekistan) Abbos Abdulloyev | Regar-TadAZ | 17 |
