= Mo'ina Khojaeva =

Uzbekistani Tajik writer (born 1941)

Mo'ina Khojaeva (born 1941) is an Uzbekistani Tajik poet and short story writer of the Soviet era.

Born in Samarkand, Khojaeva graduated from Samarkand State University in 1963, with a degree in Tajik language and literature; she then began teaching in schools in Samarkand. Her stories have appeared in publications such as Firuza, Sadoi Sharq, Jumhuriyyat, and Ovozi Tojik.
