= 2004 Tajik League =

Tajikistan's highest association football division

Tajik League
- Season: 2004
- Champions: Regar-TadAZ
- Matches: 180
- Goals: 632 (3.51 per match)
- Top goalscorer: Sukhrob Khamidov (33)

Tajik League is the top division of the Tajikistan Football Federation, it was created in 1992. These are the statistics of the Tajik League in the 2004 season.

== Table ==
Pos	Team	Pld	W	D	L	GF	GA	GD	Pts
1	Regar-TadAZ (C)	36	26	8	2	111	32	+79	86
2	Vakhsh Qurghonteppa	36	26	7	3	89	24	+65	85
3	Aviator Bobojon Ghafurov	36	22	5	9	87	33	+54	71 (Note: Aviator relocated from Chkalovsk to Ghafurov early in the season.)
4	Khujand	36	17	9	10	56	36	+20	60
5	BDA Dushanbe	36	15	7	14	65	56	+9	52
6	Uroteppa	36	11	8	17	52	65	−13	41 (Note: Uroteppa were excluded after round 31 following two no-shows.)
7	CSKA Pamir Dushanbe	36	11	4	21	55	76	−21	37
8	Danghara	36	10	7	19	47	67	−20	37
9	Ansol Kulob	36	10	6	20	55	70	−15	36
10	Safarbek Karimov Gozimalik	36	0	1	35	15	179	−164	1 (Note: Safarbek Karimov Gozimalik withdrawn after Round 22.)

Updated to match(es) played on 9 October 2015. Source: RSSF
Rules for classification: 1) points; 2) goal difference; 3) number of goals scored.
(C) Champions

== Top scorers ==
Rank	Player	Club	Goals
1	(Tajikistan) Sukhrob Khamidov	Regar-TadAZ	33
2	(Tajikistan) Nazir Rizomov	Vakhsh Qurghonteppa	32
3	(Tajikistan) Shuhrat Shamsiyev	Uroteppa	23
