= FC Panjshir =

Panjsher Balkh Панҷшер Балх
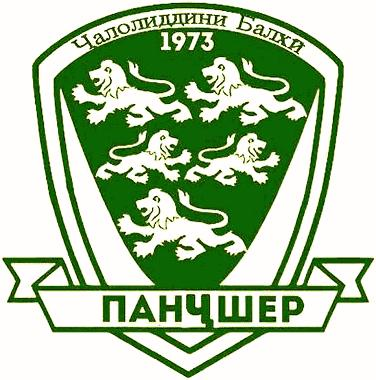
- Full name: Football Club Panjsher Balkh
- Nickname: Five Lions
- Founded: 1973; 52 years ago
- Ground: Panjsher Uktam Mamatova; Balkh, Tajikistan
- Capacity: 8,500
- Chairman: Farrukh Huseinzoda
- Manager: Boir Egamberdiev
- League: Ligai Olii
- 2025: 12 of 12 (Relegated)

Panjsher Balkh (Tajik: Панҷшер Балх) is football club from Balkh, Tajikistan.

== History ==
FC Panjsher was founded in 1973 under the name "Trud" during Soviet times. In 1997, Panjsher made their debut in the Tajik League, the top division in Tajikistan, under the name "SKA-Panjsher".

From 1998 to 2003 the club used the name "Panjsher", during which they were runners up to Regar-TadAZ in 2001. Panjsher were relegated from the Tajik League in 2003 and went on to play in the Tajikistan First League in 2005, 2009 and 2011. In 2012 Panjsher won the Tajikistan First League Dushanbe division, earning promotion back to the Tajik League for 2013. During the 2013 season Panjsher only played 5 matches before withdrawing form the Championship, returning to the First League for the 2014 season.

On 23 January 2018, Panjsher appointed Alier Ashurmamadov as their manager.

On 21 August 2018, Panjsher appointed Rustam Khojayev as manager.

=== Names ===
- 1973-1996 : Trud
- 1997 : SKA-Panjsher
- 1998–2003: Panjsher
- 2005 : Mehnat
- 2009 : Panjsher
- 2011 : Rumi
- 2012– : Panjsher

=== Domestic history ===
| Season | League | | | | | | | | | Tajik Cup | Top goalscorer | | Manager |
| Season | Div. | Pos. | Pl. | W | D | L | GS | GA | P | Tajik Cup | Name | League | Manager |
|---|---|---|---|---|---|---|---|---|---|---|---|---|---|
| 1997 | 1st | 11 | 24 | 6 | 5 | 13 | 41 | 44 | 23 | | | | |
| 1998 | 1st | 6 | 22 | 9 | 4 | 9 | 44 | 39 | 31 | | | | |
| 1999 | 1st | 8 | 22 | 8 | 2 | 12 | 43 | 37 | 32 | | | | |
| 2000 | 1st | 5 | 34 | 14 | 5 | 15 | 57 | 63 | 47 | | | | |
| 2001 | 1st | 2 | 18 | 11 | 5 | 2 | 38 | 23 | 38 | | | | |
| 2002 | 1st | 10 | 22 | 4 | 4 | 14 | 29 | 76 | 16 | | | | |
| 2003 | 1st | 12 | 30 | 6 | 5 | 19 | 57 | 90 | 23 | | | | |
| 2013^{1} | 1st | 11 | 5 | 0 | 1 | 4 | 5 | 16 | 1 | | | | |
| 2017 | 1st | 7 | 21 | 5 | 4 | 12 | 25 | 48 | 19 | | Abdukhalil Boron | 4 | |
| 2018 | 1st | 7 | 21 | 4 | 6 | 11 | 16 | 29 | 18 | Last 16 | | | Alier Ashurmamadov; Rustam Khojayev |
| 2019 | 1st | 8 | 21 | 3 | 2 | 16 | 18 | 57 | 11 | Last 16 | Sobirjon Kholmatov; Saidjon Sharipov; Amir Memari | 2 | |
| 2020 | 2nd | 3 | 22 | 12 | 5 | 5 | 63 | 27 | 41 | Last 16 | | | |
| 2021 | 2nd | 7 | 22 | 6 | 6 | 10 | 32 | 32 | 24 | Last 16 | | | |
| 2022 | 2nd | 6 | 22 | 7 | 8 | 7 | 35 | 24 | 29 | Preliminary Round | | | |
| 2023 | 2nd | 1st | 22 | 17 | 5 | 0 | 74 | 9 | 56 | | | | |
| 2024 | 1st | 11 | 22 | 4 | 4 | 14 | 16 | 41 | 16 | Last 16 | | | |
| 2025 | 1st | 12 | 22 | 2 | 6 | 14 | 16 | 41 | 12 | Last 16 | | | |

- Panjsher withdrew from the league after 5 games

== Current squad ==
As of 6 March 2025

Note: Flags indicate national team as defined under FIFA eligibility rules; some limited exceptions apply. Players may hold more than one non-FIFA nationality.

| No. | Pos. | Nation | Player |
|---|---|---|---|
| 2 | DF | TJK | Ikromjon Nasirov |
| 4 | MF | UZB | Ayubkhon Alimov |
| 5 | MF | TJK | Timur Hasanov |
| 6 | FW | CMR | Anaba Touna |
| 7 | MF | TJK | Kabir Salimshoev |
| 9 | FW | TJK | Abdulfattokh Khudoydodzoda |
| 10 | DF | TJK | Makhmadrasul Odinaev |
| 13 | DF | TJK | Qurbonboy Sheraliev |
| 15 | FW | TJK | Mukhtor Ortikov |
| 16 | GK | TJK | Khojimurod Salokhiddinov |
| 17 | DF | TJK | Ravshan Azizov |
| 18 | FW | IRN | Mehdi Babri |
| 19 | DF | TJK | Firdavs Alinazarov |

| No. | Pos. | Nation | Player |
|---|---|---|---|
| 20 | MF | CMR | Ngangue Ntengue Dorian |
| 21 | FW | GHA | Gyna Christian |
| 22 | MF | TJK | Parviz Baki-Akhunov |
| 23 | DF | TJK | Izatullo Fayzulloev |
| 24 | GK | GHA | Peter Sarkodie |
| 27 | DF | TJK | Ruzimukhammad Abdurakhmonov |
| 42 | MF | TJK | Ramazon Chilaev |
| 44 | DF | TJK | Sadriddin Eshankulov |
| 63 | MF | TJK | Umardzhon Sharipov |
| 70 | MF | UZB | Rustam Kuchkorov |
| 77 | MF | TJK | Khurshed Abdulloev |
| 88 | DF | TJK | Davlatbek Saydaminov |
