= 2001 Tajik League =

Tajik League
- Season: 2001
- Champions: Regar-TadAZ
- Matches: 90
- Goals: 306 (3.4 per match)
- Top goalscorer: Pirmurad Burhanov (19)

Tajik League is the top division of the Tajikistan Football Federation, it was created in 1992. These are the statistics of the Tajik League in the 2001 season.

== Table ==
Pos	Team	Pld	W	D	L	GF	GA	GD	Pts
1	Regar-TadAZ (C)	18	16	2	0	58	9	+49	50
2	Panjshir	18	11	5	2	38	23	+15	38
3	CSKA Pamir Dushanbe	18	9	5	4	29	19	+10	32
4	Varzob Dushanbe	18	9	4	5	39	26	+13	31
5	Khujand	18	7	6	5	36	22	+14	27
6	Poisk Dushanbe	18	7	2	9	27	39	−12	23
7	Vakhsh Qurghonteppa	18	4	3	11	16	26	−10	15
8	Umed Dushanbe	18	2	8	8	24	33	−9	14
9	Khoja Karimov Gazimalik	18	3	4	11	22	39	−17	13
10	Bofanda Dushanbe	18	1	3	14	17	70	−53	6

Updated to match(es) played on 9 October 2015. Source: RSSF
Rules for classification: 1) points; 2) goal difference; 3) number of goals scored.
(C) Champions

== Top scorers ==
Rank	Player	Club	Goals
1	(Tajikistan) Pirmurad Burhanov	Regar-TadAZ	19
2	(Tajikistan) Rabiyev	Regar-TadAZ	12
3	(Tajikistan) Kassirov	Khuja Karim	10
