= Maksim Tokarev =

Russian footballer and official

Personal information
- Full name: Maksim Nikolayevich Tokarev
- Date of birth: 7 October 1981 (age 45)
- Place of birth: Tolyatti, Russian SFSR
- Height: 1.78 m (5 ft 10 in)
- Positions: Midfielder; forward

Team information
- Current team: FC Akron Tolyatti (director)

Youth career
- Yunika Tolyatti

Senior career*
Years	Team	Apps	(Gls)
1998–2001	FC Lada Togliatti	50	(6)
2002–2003	FC Sodovik Sterlitamak	47	(12)
2004–2005	FC KAMAZ Naberezhnye Chelny	26	(1)
2005	FC Nosta Novotroitsk	18	(7)
2006–2009	FC Lada Togliatti	73	(4)
2009–2012	FC Gornyak Uchaly	73	(11)
2012–2015	FC Lada Togliatti	80	(9)

Managerial career
- 2016–2019: FC Lada-Togliatti (director)
- 2019–: FC Akron Tolyatti (director)
- * Club domestic league appearances and goals

Maksim Nikolayevich Tokarev (Russian: Максим Николаевич Токарев; born 7 October 1981) is a Russian professional football official and a former player. He works as a team director for FC Akron Tolyatti.

== Club career ==
He played 5 seasons in the Russian Football National League for FC Lada Togliatti and FC KAMAZ Naberezhnye Chelny.
