= 2006 Tajik League =

Tajik League
- Season: 2006
- Champions: Regar-TadAZ
- Relegated: Dynamo Dushanbe
- Matches: 132
- Goals: 419 (3.17 per match)
- Top goalscorer: Fozil Sattorov (20)

Tajik League is the top division of the Tajikistan Football Federation, it was created in 1992. These are the statistics of the Tajik League in the 2006 season.

== Table ==
Pos	Team	Pld	W	D	L	GF	GA	GD	Pts
1	Regar-TadAZ (C)	22	18	1	3	65	19	+46	55
2	Hima Dushanbe	22	17	3	2	58	15	+43	54
3	Vakhsh Qurghonteppa	22	15	2	5	41	18	+23	47
4	Parvoz Bobojon Ghafurov	22	15	2	5	39	25	+14	47
5	CSKA Dushanbe	22	11	2	9	38	31	+7	35
6	Tajik Telecom Qurghonteppa	22	11	2	9	41	38	+3	35
7	Khujand	22	9	3	10	27	33	−6	30
8	CSKA Pamir Dushanbe	22	5	5	12	24	39	−15	20
9	Olimi Karimzod Mastchoh	22	5	4	13	22	39	−17	19
10	Saroykamar Panj	22	5	2	15	27	50	−23	17
11	Oriyono Dushanbe	22	3	4	15	25	53	−28	13
12	Dynamo Dushanbe (R)	22	0	6	16	12	59	−47	6

Updated to match(es) played on 9 October 2015. Source: RSSF
Rules for classification: 1) points; 2) goal difference; 3) number of goals scored.
(C) Champions; (R) Relegated

== Top scorers ==
Rank	Player	Club	Goals
1	(Tajikistan) Fozil Sattorov	Tajik Telecom Qurghonteppa	20
2	(Tajikistan) Numon Hakimov	Parvoz Bobojon Ghafurov	19
