= 2003 Tajik League =

Tajik League
- Season: 2003
- Champions: Regar-TadAZ
- Matches: 240
- Goals: 937 (3.9 per match)
- Top goalscorer: Osim Boboev (38)

Tajik League is the top division of the Tajikistan Football Federation, it was created in 1992. These are the statistics of the Tajik League in the 2003 season.

== Table ==
Pos	Team	Pld	W	D	L	GF	GA	GD	Pts
1	Regar-TadAZ (C)	30	26	3	1	124	18	+106	81
2	Khujand	30	23	3	4	90	26	+64	72
3	Aviator Bobojon Ghafurov	30	23	2	5	71	25	+46	71
4	Vakhsh Qurghonteppa	30	21	5	4	83	22	+61	68
5	Farrukh Ghissar	30	19	3	8	57	31	+26	60
6	Ansol Kulob	30	17	3	10	69	46	+23	54
7	Istaravshan	30	16	6	8	69	31	+38	54
8	BDA Dushanbe	30	17	2	11	57	39	+18	53
9	CSKA Pamir Dushanbe	30	15	3	12	61	41	+20	48
10	Poisk Dushanbe	30	8	3	19	66	72	−6	27
11	Dynamo Dushanbe	30	7	5	18	46	66	−20	26
12	Panjshir	30	6	5	19	57	90	−33	23
13	Samar-Umed Dushanbe	30	5	2	23	24	90	−66	17
14	Safarbek Karim Gozimalik	30	5	2	23	24	116	−92	17
15	Khosilot Farkhor	30	4	0	26	21	135	−114	12
16	Oriyono Dushanbe	30	3	3	24	18	89	−71	12

Updated to match(es) played on 9 October 2015. Source: RSSF
Rules for classification: 1) points; 2) goal difference; 3) number of goals scored.
(C) Champions

== Top scorers ==
Rank	Player	Club	Goals
1	(Tajikistan) Osim Boboev	Regar-TadAZ	38
2	(Tajikistan) Dzhomikhon Mukhidinov	Khujand	30
3	(Tajikistan) P. Burhanov	Regar-TadAZ	28
