= Nizami Sadıqov =

Azerbaijani footballer

Nizami Vəli oğlu Sadıqov (Russian: Низами Садыгов) is an Azerbaijani former footballer and manager.

== Early life ==
Sadıqov was born in the Tovuz District and is nicknamed "Jafar" in Azerbaijan, a nickname he received as a child. He was born on November 15, 1967.

== Club playing career ==
Sadıqov was considered a fan favorite as a footballer. After retiring as a footballer, he was considered a legend in Tovuz football. Sadıqov is the Azerbaijan Premier League record holder for not conceding a ball for 1106 consecutive minutes and is also the record holder for goalkeeper with the most goals at twenty-one goals, twelve of which were penalties. He claims that he scored twenty-four goals instead of twenty-one. In total, he made 222 Azerbaijan Premier League appearances and scored 8 goals as a goalkeeper and made 26 appearances and scored 13 goals as a field player.

== International playing career ==
Sadıqov played for the Azerbaijan national football team, including a 1996 0–10 loss to France which went down in history as the "Tragedy of Auxerre".

== Managerial career ==
Sadıqov has been appointed manager of Azerbaijani side Turan on several separate occasions and has been accused of match-fixing. After that, he was appointed youth manager of Turan.

== Personal life ==
Sadıqov is the father of Azerbaijani footballer Ilkin Sadıqov.
