= Dynamo Dushanbe =

- Full name: Dynamo Dushanbe
- Founded: 1937; 88 years ago, as Dinamo Stalinabad
- Ground: Dushanbe, Tajikistan
- 2008: 6th

Dynamo Dushanbe (stylised as Russian: «Динамо») is a professional football club based in Dushanbe in Tajikistan.

== History ==
The club was founded in 1937 under the name "Dinamo Stalinabad", before changing its name to "Dynamo Dushanbe" in 1971.

In 2007, Dynamo Dushanbe merged with Oriyono Dushanbe, keeping their name.

=== Domestic history ===
Season	League									Tajik Cup	Top goalscorer		Manager
Season	Div.	Pos.	Pl.	W	D	L	GS	GA	P	Tajik Cup	Name	League	Manager
1996	1st	1	30	23	4	3	93	24	73				
2003	1st	11th	30	7	5	18	46	66	26				
2007	1st	8th	20	6	4	10	33	38	22				
2008	1st	6th	40	16	11	13	56	50	59				

=== Continental history ===
Season	Competition	Round		Club	1st Leg	2nd Leg	Aggregate
1997–98	Asian Club Championship	First round	(Kyrgyzstan)	Metallurg Kadamjay	1–2	3–0	4–2
1997–98	Asian Club Championship	Intermediate Round	(Uzbekistan)	Navbahor Namangan	0–3	2–1	2–4

== Honours ==
- Tajik League
  - Champions (1): 1996
- SSR Tajikistan League
  - Champions (7): 1937, 1949, 1950, 1951, 1953, 1955, 1958
- SSR Tajikistan Cup
  - Winners (12): 1938, 1939, 1940, 1941, 1946, 1949, 1950, 1952, 1953, 1955, 1959, 1971

== See also ==
- Dynamo FC (disambiguation)
