= Tajikistan Football League Organization =

- Лигаи футболи Тоҷикистон
- Formation: 2012
- Founder: Tajikistan Football Federation
- Type: Public sports and football organization
- Location: Tajikistan, Dushanbe, Ayni street 14/3
- Region served: Tajikistan
- Official language: Tajiki, Russian
- Secretary General: Alisher Urunov
- Parent organization: Tajikistan Football Federation
- Website: tfl.tj

Tajikistan Football League Organization (Tajik: Лигаи футболи Тоҷикистон, romanized: Ligai futboli Tojikiston; Russian: Футбольная лига Таджикистана, romanized: Futbol'naya liga Tadzhikistana) is a Tajikistani public sports football organization, founded in 2012. Is the main governing body of all divisions of the Tajikistan Football League, also Tajikistan Cup and Tajikistan Super Cup.

In Tajikistan, there is another football organization — the Tajikistan Football Federation, which controls the whole football in the country, manages various national teams (national, olympic, youth and women's teams), as well as holds the TFF Cup.
