= Hima Dushanbe =

- Full name: Hima Dushanbe
- Ground: Dushanbe, Tajikistan
- League: Tajik League
- 2007: 9th

Hima Dushanbe is a football club based in Dushanbe, Tajikistan. It was founded in 1954.

== History ==
=== Domestic history ===
Season	League									Tajik Cup	Top goalscorer		Manager
Season	Div.	Pos.	Pl.	W	D	L	GS	GA	P	Tajik Cup	Name	League	Manager
2005	1st	6th	18	6	5	7	29	29	23				
2006	1st	2	22	17	3	2	58	15	54	Runner-Up			
2007	1st	9th	20	9	6	5	39	27	33	Runner-Up	(Tajikistan) Sukhrob Khamidov	21	
