= 1xBet =

Cyprus-based online casino

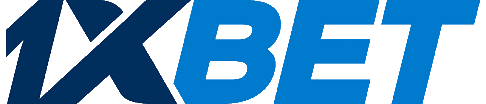
- Website type: Private
- Available in: Multilingual
- Founded: 2007
- Headquarters: Limassol, Cyprus
- Area served: International; barred from operations in some countries
- Key people: Not known
- Industry: Online gambling
- Products: Online casino
- Services: Sports betting and other forms of gambling
- Employees: 5000 (2022)
- Website: 1xbet.com

1xbet (stylized as 1xBet) is an online casino founded in 2007. The company received its gambling license from the gambling control board of Curaçao. It is one of the largest illegal gambling sites in the world, having being banned from operation in major countries like the United States, United Kingdom, Russia, France, Spain, and others. It is described as "one of the most controversial bookmakers in the world" by gambling researcher Jack Kerr, allowing bets to be made on political, economic and cultural events, and even the weather. Countries where 1xBet can legitimately operate in are mostly located in Africa, South America, South and Southeast Asia. The company is legally headquartered in Cyprus; it has oblique ownership, with its owners' identity not publicly disclosed.

The company sponsors major professional football teams such as Spain's FC Barcelona, Ecuador's Barcelona S.C., France's Paris Saint-Germain, and esports organisations including OG Esports, Team Spirit, Made in Brazil and Tundra Esports. According to Sports Illustrated, 1xBet is "probably the biggest sportsbook on the planet". The company has notably partnered with celebrities such as singer GIMS, Lethwei fighter Dave Leduc, UFC fighters Conor Mcgregor and Carlos Prates. It is the official betting partner of the 2025 Billie Jean King Cup.

== History ==
The company was founded in Russia by Roman Semiokhin, Dmitry Kazorin, and a former Russian intelligence agent named Sergey Karshkov (d. June 2023). By 2021, their company had made more than US$655 million in illegal gambling.

In March 2020, 1xBet confirmed the company's expansion into the Mexican market following its approval for an operational licence. The company also announced its plan to focus on the esports betting market within the Latin American country.

In March 2022, 1xBet expanded into the Chilean market by signing a partnership agreement with the Chilean football championship, with the company becoming part of the 138 matches of the 2022 season.

In November 2022, Canadian-Burmese Lethwei world champion Dave Leduc became an ambassador 1xBet.

In October 2023, Congolese singer GIMS became an ambassador for 1xBet.

Despite criminal prosecution in several countries, 1xBet secured major sponsorship contracts, for example, it remains the sponsor of FC Barcelona until 2029 and sponsors Paris Saint-Germain FC from 2022 to 2025. As of 2024, the monthly average number of visitors to its platform exceeded 5 million, and the company passed the first round of licensing applications to legally operate in Brazil.

In February 2025, it became the title sponsor of the Maharlika Pilipinas Basketball League in the Philippines under a contract supposedly last up through 2026, however the sponsorship was later dropped mid-season.

In April 2025, 1xBet was named the Official Global Betting Partner of the Billie Jean King Cup. The deal includes exclusive branding rights across qualifiers, playoffs, and finals until 2026, marking the first standalone betting sponsorship for the tournament.

In October 2025, 1xBet was also named the Official Betting Partner of the ATP Challenger Tour, with the partnership covering more than 30 tournaments across Europe, Asia, North and South America.

In 2026, Brazilian UFC fighter Carlos Prates became an ambassador for the brand.

In 2026, UFC fighter Conor McGregor was announced as a global brand ambassador for 1xBet ahead of his anticipated return to mixed martial arts at UFC 329.

== Legality ==
In Ireland, the 1xBet brand is operated by Terminus Platform Ireland Limited, which holds bookmaking license. 1xBet claimed to hold local licences in more than 35 markets across Latin America, Africa and Western Europe. The company identified Serbia and Guatemala as two of its more recent regulated-market entries and said that obtaining additional national licences was a central part of its 2026 expansion strategy.

In the United Kingdom, a license for remote gambling is required from the Gambling Commission. License type differs depending on the type of activities that the gambling facility offers.

=== Controversy ===
In 2019, The Sunday Times conducted an investigation, which led to 1xBet's licence to be revoked by the UK Gambling Commission after revelations of involvement 'promoting a "pornhub casino', bets on children's sports and cockfighting, and advertising on illegal websites."

In 2020, 1xBet was added to Russia's blacklist of payment processors and the Federal Tax Service.

In 2024, Bellingcat and the platform Josimar reported that 1xBet allegedly organized thousands of live-streamed amateur games involving fake teams and children as young as 14 years old.

=== Criminal investigation ===
International arrest warrants have been issued for the company's three founders, one of whom reportedly died in Switzerland in 2023. In early 2020, awareness was raised of an unlawful practice, an international arrest warrant was issued by Russian authorities. Later, in August 2020, the Directorate of the Investigative Committee for the Russian Bryansk Region released the names of the supposed creators of 1xBet. These are "Sergey Karshkov", "Roman Semiokhin" and "Dmitry Kazorin". All three have Cypriot citizenship. The trio are suspected of organizing the online bookmaker 1xBet, and are defendants in a criminal case, with penalty of imprisonment. A number of estates in Russia with a total value of 1.5 billion rubles were seized.

In 2021, Parlan Law Firm announced a search for victims of 1xBet in Russia. The company has organized a service for filing applications to the investigative committee. They filed a lawsuit against the owner of the Russian version of 1xBet – bookmaker 1xStavka.

In 2023, Morocco's National Judicial Police Brigade (BNPJ) opened a mass investigation into 1xBet among other gambling websites on charges of operating an illegal gambling enterprise following a complaint by MDJS.

In November 2021 1xBet's subsidiary company, 1xCorp MV, filed for bankruptcy in a Curaçao court after it refused to refund a group of gamblers represented by the foundation for Curaçao gaming victims. The company was declared bankrupt in June 2022 but continued to operate. The individuals state that 1xBet structurally denies the legitimate wins of players with millions of euros in unpaid winnings. In January 2023, 1xCorp MV was declared bankrupt by the Dutch Supreme Court in the Netherlands.
