= 2000 Tajik League =

Tajik League
- Season: 2000
- Champions: Varzob Dushanbe
- Matches: 162
- Goals: 597 (3.69 per match)
- Top goalscorer: Mansur Khakimov (28)

Tajik League is the top division of the Tajikistan Football Federation, it was created in 1992. These are the statistics of the Tajik League in the 2000 season.

== Table ==
Pos	Team	Pld	W	D	L	GF	GA	GD	Pts
1	Varzob Dushanbe (C)	34	27	6	1	111	22	+89	87
2	Regar-TadAZ	34	23	8	3	83	23	+60	77
3	Khujand	34	21	5	8	94	37	+57	68
4	CSKA Pamir Dushanbe	34	15	7	12	54	51	+3	52
5	Panjshir	34	14	5	15	57	63	−6	47
6	Khoja Karimov Gazimalik	34	14	3	17	47	61	−14	45
7	Vakhsh Qurghonteppa	34	10	3	21	57	83	−26	33
8	Ravshan Kulob	34	9	6	19	54	74	−20	33
9	Umed Dushanbe	18	2	3	13	21	65	−44	9 (Note: At the end of the second leg, Saddam Sarband were withdrawn for not paying a fine. In order to keep the round structure, Umed Dushanbe were admitted instead.)
10	Lokomotive Dushanbe	34	1	6	27	19	111	−92	9

Updated to match(es) played on 9 October 2015. Source: RSSF
Rules for classification: 1) points; 2) goal difference; 3) number of goals scored.
(C) Champions

== Top scorers ==
Rank	Player	Club	Goals
1	(Tajikistan) Mansur Khakimov	Khujand	28
2	(Tajikistan) P.Burkhanov	Regar-TadAZ	20
3	(Tajikistan) B.Zakirov	Panjsher	18
4	(Tajikistan) Ashurmamadov	Varzob	17
5	(Tajikistan) Kh.Zardov	Varzob	16
