= 1998 Tajik League =

Tajik League
- Season: 1998
- Champions: Varzob Dushanbe
- Matches: 132
- Goals: 405 (3.07 per match)

Tajik League is the top division of the Tajikistan Football Federation, it was created in 1992. These are the statistics of the Tajik League in the 1998 season.

== Table ==
Pos	Team	Pld	W	D	L	GF	GA	GD	Pts
1	Varzob Dushanbe (C)	22	17	5	0	57	17	+40	56
2	Khujand	22	13	5	4	44	19	+25	44
3	Saddam-Faizali Sarband	22	12	6	4	47	30	+17	42
4	Khoja Karimov Gazimalik	22	9	8	5	30	24	+6	35
5	Ranjbar Vosse	22	9	5	8	39	36	+3	32
6	Panjshir	22	9	4	9	44	39	+5	31
7	CSKA Pamir Dushanbe	22	7	9	6	31	32	−1	30
8	Vakhsh Kurgan-Tyube	22	8	3	11	30	28	+2	27
9	Regar-TadAZ	22	6	7	9	24	29	−5	25
10	Bofanda Dushanbe	22	6	7	9	30	42	−12	25
11	Shodmon Ghissar	22	2	5	15	17	51	−34	11
12	Bakhtiyer Pyanj	22	1	2	19	12	60	−48	5

Updated to match(es) played on 9 October 2015. Source: RSSF
Rules for classification: 1) points; 2) goal difference; 3) number of goals scored.
(C) Champions
