= Tajikistan Higher League =

Tajikistan Top League
- Organising body: Tajikistan Football League Organization; Tajikistan Football Federation
- Founded: 1992; 34 years ago
- Country: Tajikistan
- Confederation: AFC
- Number of clubs: 10
- Level on pyramid: 1
- Relegation to: Tajikistan First League
- Domestic cup(s): Tajikistan Cup; Tajik Supercup
- League cup: TFF Cup
- International cup: AFC Champions League Two
- Current champions: Istiklol
- Most championships: Istiklol (14 titles)
- Top scorer: Manuchekhr Dzhalilov (141 goals)
- Broadcaster(s): TFF Futbol, Varzish TV
- Website: tfl.tj fft.tj
- Current: 2026 Tajikistan Higher League

The Ligai Olii Tojikiston or Tajikistan Top League (Tajik: Лигаи Олии Тоҷикистон; Russian: Высшая лига Таджикистана, romanized: Vysshaya liga Tadzhikistana) is the top division of professional football in Tajikistan. It is part of the Tajikistan Football League Organization and Tajikistan Football Federation.

It was founded in 1992, with 8 clubs participating. The first champion of the league was CSKA Pomir Dushanbe. Currently the most successful team is FC Istiklol.

== Clubs ==
=== Soviet era ===
- 1937: Dinamo Stalinabad
- 1938–47: not played
- 1948: Sbornaya Gissara
- 1949: Dinamo Stalinabad
- 1950: Dinamo Stalinabad
- 1951: Dinamo Stalinabad
- 1952: Profsoyuz Leninabad
- 1953: Dinamo Stalinabad
- 1954: Profsoyuz Leninabad
- 1955: Dinamo Stalinabad
- 1956: Metallurg Leninabad
- 1957: Taksobaza Stalinabad
- 1958: Dinamo Stalinabad
- 1959: Kuroma Taboshary
- 1960: Pogranichnik Dushanbe
- 1961: Vakhsh Kurgan-Tyube
- 1962: Pogranichnik Dushanbe
- 1963: DSA Dushanbe
- 1964: Zvezda Dushanbe
- 1965: Zvezda Dushanbe
- 1966: Volga Dushanbe
- 1967: Irrigator Dushanbe
- 1968: Irrigator Dushanbe
- 1969: Irrigator Dushanbe
- 1970: Pedagogichesky Institut Dushanbe
- 1971: TIFK Dushanbe
- 1972: Neftyanik Leninsky Rayon
- 1973: Politekhnichesky Institut Dushanbe
- 1974: SKIF Dushanbe
- 1975: SKIF Dushanbe
- 1976: SKIF Dushanbe
- 1977: Metallurg Regar Tursunzoda
- 1978: Pakhtakor Kurgan-Tyube
- 1979: Trudovye Rezervy Dushanbe
- 1980: Chashma Shaartuz
- 1981: Trikotazhnik Ura-Tyube
- 1982: Trikotazhnik Ura-Tyube
- 1983: Trikotazhnik Ura-Tyube
- 1984: Trikotazhnik Ura-Tyube
- 1985: Vakhsh Kurgan-Tyube
- 1986: SKIF Dushanbe
- 1987: SKIF Dushanbe
- 1988: SKIF Dushanbe
- 1989: Metallurg Regar Tursunzoda
- 1990: Avtomobilist Kurgan-Tyube
- 1991: Sokhibkor Dushanbe

=== Since independence ===
Season	Winners	Runners-up	Third place	Golden Boot	Player of the Year
1992	CSKA Pamir Dushanbe	Regar-TadAZ	Vakhsh	Umed Alidodov, 11 (CSKA Pamir Dushanbe)	
1993	Sitora Dushanbe	CSKA Pamir Dushanbe	Pakhtakor Proletarsk	Kholmurod Zardov, 30 (CSKA Pamir Dushanbe)	
1994	Sitora Dushanbe	CSKA Pamir Dushanbe	Pakhtakor Proletarsk	Davlat Sodikov, 26 (Khulbuk Vose)	
1995	CSKA Pamir Dushanbe	Istaravshan	Sitora Dushanbe	Zokir Berdikulov, 42 (Istaravshan)	
1996	Dynamo Dushanbe	Sitora Dushanbe	Khujand	Muhitdin Izzatulloev, 35 (Ravshan Kulob)	
1997	Vakhsh Qughonteppa	Ranjbar Vosse	Khujand	Rustam Usmonov, 20 (Vakhsh Qughonteppa)	
1998	Varzob Dushanbe	Khujand	Saddam-Faizali Sarband	Nazir Rizomov, 23 (Saddam-Faizali Sarband)	
1999	Varzob Dushanbe	Khoja Karimov Gazimalik	Ravshan Kulob	Oraz Nazarov, 27 (Varzob Dushanbe)	
2000	Varzob Dushanbe	Regar-TadAZ	Khujand	Mansurjon Hakimov, 28 (Khujand)	
2001	Regar-TadAZ	Panjshir	CSKA Pamir Dushanbe	Pirmurod Burkhonov, 19 (Regar-TadAZ)	
2002	Regar-TadAZ	Khujand	Farrukh Ghissar	Dzhomikhon Mukhidinov, 29 (Khujand)	
2003	Regar-TadAZ	Khujand	Aviator Bobojon Ghafurov	Osimjon Boboev, 38 (Regar-TadAZ)	Asliddin Khabibullaev (Vakhsh Qurghonteppa)
2004	Regar-TadAZ	Vakhsh Qurghonteppa	Aviator Bobojon Ghafurov	Sukhrob Khamidov, 33 (Regar-TadAZ)	Anvar Norkulov (Aviator Bobojon Ghafurov)
2005	Vakhsh Qurghonteppa	Regar-TadAZ	Aviator Bobojon Ghafurov	Akhtam Khamrakulov & Nazir Rizomov, 12 (Vakhsh Qurghonteppa)	Khurshed Makhmudov (Regar-TadAZ)
2006	Regar-TadAZ	Hima Dushanbe	Vakhsh Qurghonteppa	Fozil Sattorov, 20 (Tajik Telecom Qurghonteppa)	Khurshed Makhmudov (Regar-TadAZ)
2007	Regar-TadAZ	Parvoz Bobojon Ghafurov	Vakhsh Qurghonteppa	Sukhrob Khamidov, 21 (Hima Dushanbe)	Numonjon Hakimov (Parvoz Bobojon Ghafurov)
2008	Regar-TadAZ	Parvoz Bobojon Ghafurov	Khujand	Numonjon Hakimov, 30 (Parvoz Bobojon Ghafurov)	Khurshed Makhmudov (Regar-TadAZ)
2009	Vakhsh Qurghonteppa	Regar-TadAZ	Khujand	Numonjon Hakimov, 30 (Vakhsh Qurghonteppa)	Numonjon Hakimov (Vakhsh Qurghonteppa)
2010	Istiklol	Regar-TadAZ	Vakhsh Qurghonteppa	Yusuf Rabiev, 30 (Istiklol)	Yusuf Rabiev (Istiklol)
2011	Istiklol	Regar-TadAZ	Ravshan Kulob	Yusuf Rabiev, 32 (Istiklol)	Khurshed Makhmudov (Regar-TadAZ)
2012	Ravshan Kulob	Regar-TadAZ	Istiklol	Dilshod Vasiyev, 24 (Istiklol)	Dilshod Vasiyev (Istiklol)
2013	Ravshan Kulob	Istiklol	Khayr Vahdat	Hossein Sohrabi, 11 (Istiklol/Khayr Vahdat)	Dilshod Vasiyev (Istiklol)
2014	Istiklol	Khayr Vahdat	Daleron-Uroteppa	Dilshod Vasiyev, 15 (Istiklol)	Nuriddin Davronov (Istiklol)
2015	Istiklol	Khujand	Ravshan Kulob	Manuchekhr Dzhalilov, 22 (Istiklol)	Manuchekhr Dzhalilov (Istiklol)
2016	Istiklol	Khosilot Farkhor	Regar-TadAZ	Manuchekhr Dzhalilov, 22 (Istiklol)	Manuchekhr Dzhalilov (Istiklol)
2017	Istiklol	Khujand	CSKA Pamir Dushanbe	Dilshod Vasiyev, 16 (Istiklol)	Fatkhullo Fatkhuloev (Istiklol)
2018	Istiklol	Khujand	Kuktosh Rudaki	Sheriddin Boboyev, 12 (Istiklol)	Sheriddin Boboyev (Istiklol)
2019	Istiklol	Khujand	Regar-TadAZ	Sheriddin Boboyev, 16 (Istiklol)	Sheriddin Boboyev (Istiklol)
2020	Istiklol	Khujand	CSKA Pamir Dushanbe	Ilhomjon Barotov, 18 (Istaravshan)	Ilhomjon Barotov (Istaravshan)
2021	Istiklol	Khujand	CSKA Pamir Dushanbe	Manuchekhr Dzhalilov, 18 (Istiklol)	
2022	Istiklol	Ravshan Kulob	Khujand	Manuchekhr Dzhalilov, 16 (Istiklol)	
2023	Istiklol	Ravshan Kulob	Kuktosh Rudaki	Alisher Dzhalilov, 13 (Istiklol)	Rustam Yatimov (Istiklol)
2024	Istiklol	Khujand	Ravshan Kulob	Manuchekhr Dzhalilov, 17 (Istiklol)	Manuchekhr Dzhalilov (Istiklol)
2025	Istiklol	Vakhsh Bokhtar	CSKA Pamir Dushanbe	Paul Komolafe, 12 (Khujand / Istiklol)	

Wins by club

Club	Wins	Winning years
Istiklol	14	2010, 2011, 2014, 2015, 2016, 2017, 2018, 2019, 2020, 2021, 2022, 2023, 2024, 2025
Regar-TadAZ Tursunzoda	7	2001, 2002, 2003, 2004, 2006, 2007, 2008
Varzob Dushanbe	3	1998, 1999, 2000
Vakhsh Qurghonteppa	3	1997, 2005, 2009
Sitora Dushanbe	2	1993, 1994
CSKA Pamir Dushanbe	2	1992, 1995
Ravshan Kulob	2	2012, 2013
Dynamo Dushanbe	1	1996

=== 2026 season ===
Locations of teams in the 2026 Tajikistan Higher League

Twelve clubs compete in the 2025 Tajikistan Higher League, with two promoted from Tajikistan First League:

2026 Club	2025 Position	First season in top division	Seasons in top division	First season of current spell in top division	Top division titles	Most recent top division title
Barkchi Hisor	8th	2007	14	2024	0	-
CSKA Pamir Dushanbe	3rd	1992	28	2019	2	1995
Eskhata	6th	2021	4	2021	0	-
Istaravshan	10th	1992	15	2024	0	-
Istiklol	1st	2009	17	2009	13	2025
Hosilot Farkhor	9th	1992	13	2023	0	-
Khujand	5th	1997	29	1997	0	-
Parvoz	1st (TFL)	2003	15	2026	0	-
Ravshan Kulob	4th	1992	22	2021	3	2013
Regar-TadAZ	7th	1992	33	2022	7	2008
Sardor	2nd (TFL)	2026	1	2026	0	-
Vakhsh Bokhtar	2nd	1992	32	1995	3	2009

== Sponsorship ==
Period	Brand	Sponsor
1992–2015	Tajik League	No sponsor
2016	Tajik League	Yovar Supermarkets
2017	Tajik League	MegaFon
2018	Tajik League	Somon Air
2019	Tajikistan Top League	Siyoma
2020–2022	Tajikistan Top League	Coca-Cola
2023–present	Tajikistan Top League	1xBet

== All-time goalscorers ==
As of match played 8 December 2024

Rank	Player	Goals	Years
1	(Tajikistan) Manuchekhr Dzhalilov	141	2015–17, 2020–
2	(Tajikistan) Sukhrob Khamidov	122	1997–2009

== Foreign players ==
- List of foreign football players in Tajikistan
