= 1999 Tajik League =

Tajik League
- Season: 1999
- Champions: Varzob Dushanbe
- Matches: 132
- Goals: 465 (3.52 per match)
- Top goalscorer: Oraz Nazarov (27)

Tajik League is the top division of the Tajikistan Football Federation, it was created in 1992. These are the statistics of the Tajik League in the 1999 season.

== Table ==
Pos	Team	Pld	W	D	L	GF	GA	GD	Pts
1	Varzob Dushanbe (C)	22	18	3	1	83	9	+74	57
2	Khoja Karimov Gazimalik	22	16	1	5	42	21	+21	49
3	Ravshan Kulob	22	15	1	6	62	36	+26	46
4	Regar-TadAZ	22	14	3	5	52	14	+38	45
5	Saddam-Faizali Sarband	22	12	5	5	45	28	+17	41
6	Khujand	22	13	1	8	60	28	+32	40
7	Bofanda Dushanbe	22	10	2	10	43	37	+6	32
8	Panjshir	22	8	2	12	31	44	−13	26
9	Ranjbar Vosse	22	7	2	13	17	43	−26	23
10	Istaravshan	22	3	3	16	11	42	−31	12
11	Lokomotive Dushanbe	22	2	2	18	13	76	−63	8
12	Vakhsh Kurgan-Tyube	22	1	0	21	6	82	−76	3

Updated to match(es) played on 9 October 2015. Source: RSSF
Rules for classification: 1) points; 2) goal difference; 3) number of goals scored.
(C) Champions

== Top scorers ==
Rank	Player	Club	Goals
1	(Tajikistan) Oraz Nazarov	Varzob	27
2	(Tajikistan) S.Khamidov	Varzob	19
3	(Tajikistan) I.Isakov	Ravshan	18
4	(Tajikistan) Mansur Khakimov	Khujand	17
