= Varzob Dushanbe =

Football club in Tajikistan

BDA Dushanbe
- Full name: BDA Dushanbe
- Founded: 1996; 29 years ago
- Ground: Central Republican Stadium; Dushanbe, Tajikistan
- Capacity: 20,000
- League: Tajik Second Division

BDA Dushanbe is a football club based in Dushanbe, Tajikistan. Formed in 1996 as Varzob Dushanbe, the club changed to their current name in 2001.

== History ==
=== Domestic history ===
Season	League									Tajik Cup	Top goalscorer	
Season	Div.	Pos.	Pl.	W	D	L	GS	GA	P	Tajik Cup	Name	League
1998	1st	1	22	17	5	0	57	17	56	Winners		
1999	1st	1	22	18	3	1	83	9	57	Winners	(Tajikistan) Oraz Nazarov	27
2000	1st	1	34	27	6	1	111	22	87		(Tajikistan) Ashurmamadov	17
2001	1st	4	18	9	4	5	39	26	31			
2002	1st	5	22	13	3	6	60	37	42		(Tajikistan) Fuzailov	26
2003	1st	8	30	17	2	11	57	39	53			
2004	1st	5	36	15	7	14	65	56	52			

=== Continental history ===
Season	Competition	Round	Club	Home	Away	Aggregate
1999–2000	Asian Cup Winners' Cup	First round	(Kyrgyzstan) CAG-Dinamo-MVD Bishkek	4–0	1–1	5–0
1999–2000	Asian Cup Winners' Cup	Second round	(Kazakhstan) Irtysh	0–4	0–1	0–5
2000–01	Asian Cup Winners' Cup	First round	(Uzbekistan) Dustlik	w/o^{1}		
2000–01	Asian Cup Winners' Cup	Second round	(Kazakhstan) Irtysh	1–4	2–3	3–7

^{1} FC Dustlik did not show up for the 1st leg in Dushanbe due to the Tajikistani civil war; they were ejected from the competition and fined $10,000.

== Managers ==
- (Tajikistan) Sharif Nazarov (1999?–01?)

== Honours ==
- Tajik League
  - Champions (3): 1998, 1999, 2000
- Tajik Cup
  - Winners (2): 1998, 1999
