= Tajikistan Cup =

Tajikistan Cup Jomi Tojikiston
- Organising body: Tajikistan Football Federation, Tajikistan Football League Organization
- Founded: 1992; 34 years ago
- Number of clubs: 25
- Domestic cup: Tajikistan Super Cup
- Current champions: Khujand (6th title) (2026)
- Most championships: Istiklol (10 titles)
- Broadcasters: TFF Futbol, Varzish TV
- Website: tfl.tj fft.tj
- Current: 2026

The Jomi Tojikiston (Tajik: Ҷоми Тоҷикистон; Russian: Кубок Таджикистана), or Tajikistan Cup, is the top knockout football tournament of Tajikistan. Tajikistan Cup was established in 1992. Now Parimatch is the sponsor and the sponsored name for the cup is Parimatch Çomi Toçikiston.

The Cup winner qualifies to play the Tajikistan Premier League winner for the Tajikistan Super Cup. The winner of the competition ordinarily got a spot in the AFC Champions League Two.

== History ==
In February 2023, the Football League of Tajikistan signed a contract with the company 1xbet, naming the company as the main sponsor of the tournament for the next years.

== Participants ==
All clubs from the Tajikistan Premier League and First Division compete for the Tajikistan Cup.

== Competition system ==
The competition is held under knockout format.

Premier League teams enter the tournament at Round of 16 final stage.

The final tie is played as a single match. The final is played at various venues across the country.

== Trophy and prize money ==
Tajikistan Football Federation awards the Tajikistan Cup trophy to the winners of the final. . Cup winners and runners-up receive medals. Also, prize money is given away. The prize money is in Tajikistani somoni. In 2024, the winner of the Tajikistan Cup received a check for 60 thousand somoni. The finalist of the Cup received 40 thousand somoni.

Round	Number of teams	Prize per team (SM)	Total prize (SM)
Runners-up	1	40,000	40,000
Cup winners	1	60,000	60,000

== Venues ==
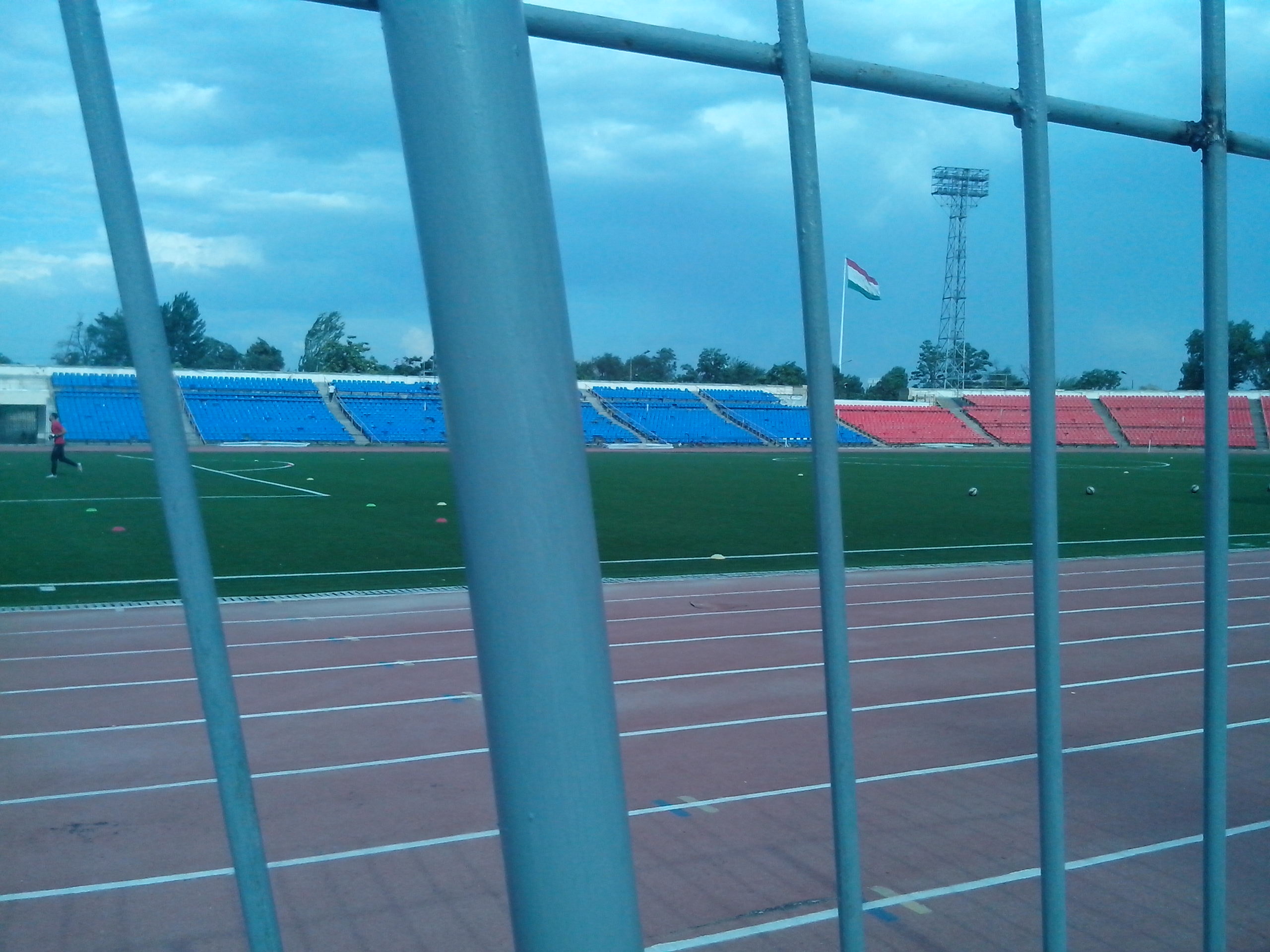
Republican Central Stadium in Dushanbe

Until 2018, the Tajikistan Cup final was generally played at the Republican Central Stadium in Dushanbe.

== Winners ==
=== Tajikistan Cup ===
Season	Winner	Runner-up	Stadium	Attendance	Score	Ref.
1992	Pamir	Regar-TadAZ	Pamir Stadium	21,000	1–0	
1993	Sitara	Ravshan	Pamir Stadium	9,000	0–0 (5–3 (p))	
1994	Ravshan	Shadman	Pamir Stadium	6,000	2–1	
1995	Pakhtakor	Regar-TadAZ	Pamir Stadium	7,000	0–0 (3–2 (p))	
1996–97	Khatlon	Khujand	Pamir Stadium	9,000	4–0	
1997–98	Khujand	Randjbar	Pamir Stadium	2,500	2–1	
1998	Varzab	Khoja Karim	Pamir Stadium	4,000	3–1	
1999	Varzab	Regar-TadAZ	Pamir Stadium	4,000	0–0 (4–2 (p))	
2000–01	Regar-TadAZ	Varzab	Pamir Stadium	2,700	4–2	
2001–02	Regar-TadAZ	Khujand	Pamir Stadium	1,600	3–1	
2002	Khujand	Khatlon	Pamir Stadium	3,000	3–0	
2003	Khatlon	Olimp-Ansal	Pamir Stadium	2,000	3–1	
2004	Parvaz	Urateppa	Pamir Stadium	1,500	5–0	
2005	Regar-TadAZ	Khatlon	Pamir Stadium	10,000	1–1 (4–2 (p))	
2006	Regar-TadAZ	Hima	Pamir Stadium	8,000	2–1	
2007	Parvaz	Hima	Pamir Stadium	5,000	1–0	
2008	Khujand	Energetic	Metallurg Stadium	12,000	2–1	
2009	Istiklol	CSKA Pamir	Pamir Stadium	11,000	2–1	
2010	Istiklol	Khujand	Pamir Stadium	8,000	5–0	
2011	Regar-TadAZ	Istiklol	Kurghanteppa Stadium	8,000	1–0	
2012	Regar-TadAZ	Istiklol	Pamir Stadium	11,000	1–1 (6–5 (p))	
2013	Istiklol	Regar-TadAZ	Kurghanteppa Stadium	5,000	2–0	
2014	Istiklol	Regar-TadAZ	Pamir Stadium	7,000	5–2	
2015	Istiklol	Regar-TadAZ	Pamir Stadium	3,500	2–2 (6–5 (p))	
2016	Istiklol	Khosilot Farkhor	Pamir Stadium	6,000	2–2 (3–2 (p))	
2017	Khujand	Istiklol	Pamir Stadium	3,000	2–0	
2018	Istiklol	Regar-TadAZ	Central Stadium Vahdat	15,145	1–0	
2019	Istiklol	Regar-TadAZ	Central Stadium Hisor	4,500	1–1 (4–2 (p))	
2020	Ravshan	Khatlon Bokhtar	Markazii Tojikiston Stadium	0	1–0	
2021	Khujand	Istiklol	20 Years of Independence Stadium	20,700	2–0	
2022	Istiklol	Kuktosh Rudaki	Pakhtakor Stadium	6,500	2–2 (5–4 (p))	
2023	Istiklol	Ravshan	Kulob Arena Stadium	12,200	1–1 (4–2 (p))	
2024	Regar-TadAZ	Khujand	Istaravshan Sports Complex	13,250	2–1	
2025	Regar-TadAZ	Ekshata	20 Years of Independence Stadium	13,850	5–0	
2026	Khujand	Sardor	Istaravshan Sports Complex	12,500	2–1	

=== Soviet era ===
- 1938 Dinamo Stalinabad
- 1939 Dinamo Stalinabad
- 1940 Dinamo Stalinabad
- 1941 Dinamo Stalinabad
- 1942 KVAU Dushanbe
- 1943–1945 No tournament
- 1946 Dinamo Stalinabad
- 1947 Hisar Team
- 1948 Hisar Team
- 1949 Dinamo Stalinabad
- 1950 Dinamo Stalinabad
- 1951 ODO Stalinabad
- 1952 Dinamo Stalinabad
- 1953 Dinamo Stalinabad
- 1954 Profsoyuz Leninabad
- 1955 Dinamo Stalinabad
- 1956 Taksobaza Stalinabad
- 1957 Metallurg Leninabad
- 1958 Pedagogichesky Institut Leninabad
- 1959 Dinamo Stalinabad
- 1960 Pogranichnik Stalinabad
- 1961 Pedinstitut Dushanbe
- 1962 Pogranichnik Leninabad
- 1963 DSA Dushanbe
- 1964 Kuroma Taboshary
- 1965 Vashkh Kurgan-Tyube
- 1966 Volga Dushanbe
- 1967 Pedinstitut Dushanbe
- 1968 Stroitel' Kumsangir
- 1969 Pedinstitut Dushanbe
- 1970 Kommunalschik Chkalovsk
- 1971 Dinamo Dushanbe
- 1972 TPI Dushanbe
- 1973 TIFK Dushanbe
- 1974 SKIF Dushanbe
- 1975 SKIF Dushanbe
- 1976 SKIF Dushanbe
- 1977 Volga Dushanbe
- 1978 Kuroma Taboshar
- 1979 Metallurg Tursunzade
- 1980 Chashma Shaartuz
- 1981 Trikotazhnik Urateppa
- 1982 Irrigator Dushanbe
- 1983 Volga Dushanbe
- 1984 Metallurg Tursunzade
- 1985 Avtomobilist Kurghanteppa
- 1986 SKIF Dushanbe
- 1987 Metallurg Tursunzade
- 1988 Avtomobilist Kurghanteppa
- 1989 Metallurg Tursunzade
- 1990 Volga Dushanbe
- 1991 Avtomobilist Kurghanteppa

=== Results by team ===
Since independence.

Results by team
Club	Wins	Runners-up	Total final appearances
Istiklol	10	4	14
Regar-TadAZ	8	8	15
Khujand	6	4	10
Khatlon	2	3	5
Ravshan Kulob	2	3	5
Varzob Dushanbe	2	1	3
Parvoz Bobojon Ghafurov	2	0	2
CSKA Pamir Dushanbe	1	1	2
Sitora Dushanbe	1	0	1
Pakhtakor Dzhabarrasulovsk	1	0	1
Hima Dushanbe	0	2	2
Shodmon Ghissar	0	1	1
Ranjbar Vose	0	1	1
Istaravshan	0	1	1
Energetik Dushanbe	0	1	1
Khosilot Farkhor	0	1	1
Kuktosh Rudaki	0	1	1
Sardor Tursunzoda	0	1	1
