= 2026 FC Istiklol season =

FC Istiklol
2026 season
- President: Shohruh Saidov
- Head Coach: Vitaly Levchenko
- Stadium: Republican Stadium; Central Stadium
- Higher League: 1st
- Tajikistan Cup: Round of 16
- Super Cup: Runners-up
- AFC Challenge League: Group stage
- Top goalscorer: League: Mukhammadzhon Rakhimov (3); All: Mukhammadzhon Rakhimov (4)
Home colours	Away colours

The FC Istiklol 2026 season is Istiklol's eighteenth Tajik League season, of which they are defending Tajik League Champions, and will also participated in the Tajik Cup, Tajik Supercup and AFC Challenge League.

== Season events ==
On 14 January, Istiklol announced that they had extended their contract with Rustam Soirov until the end of the 2027 season, and that they had signed Alidzhon Karomatullozoda from Ravshan Kulob.

On 15 January, Istiklol announced that they had extended their contract with Manuchekhr Safarov until the end of the 2026 season.

On 20 January, Istiklol announced the signing of Dmytro Bilonoh from Vakhsh Bokhtar to a one-year contract.

On 25 January, Istiklol announced that they had extended their contract with Amirbek Juraboev until the end of the 2026 season.

On 29 January, Istiklol announced that they had decided not to extended their contract with Paul Komolafe and that he had become a free-agent.

On 3 February, Istiklol announced the return of Vitaly Levchenko to the club as their new head coach on a contract until the end of 2026.

On 4 February, Istiklol announced the signing of Daler Sharipov from Khujand to a one-year contract.

On 8 February, Istiklol announced the signings of Frane Ikić, Josip Tomašević and Frane Čirjak, all on contracts until the end of the season.

On 12 February, Istiklol announced the signing of Ivan Zotko from Uzgen, on a contract until the end of the season.

On 13 February, Istiklol announced that they had mutually agreed with Kirill Suslov to terminate his contract.

On 14 February, Istiklol announced the signing of Luka Zgursky from Atyrau, on a contract until the end of the season.

On 18 February, Shakhtar Donetsk announced that Khusrav Toirov had joined Istiklol on loan until 30 November 2026.

On 25 February, Istiklol announced the signing of Denis Kavlinov, whose last club was Zhetysu, on a contract until the end of the season.

On 2 March, Manuchekhr Dzhalilov announced his retirement from football.

On 4 March, Istiklol announced that Shahrom Sulaymonov had joined Khosilot Farkhor.

On 5 March, Istiklol announced the signing of Alidzhoni Ayni from Samgurali Tskaltubo.

On 14 July, Istiklol announced the signing of Alisher Shukurov from Qizilqum, and the return to the club of Shahrom Samiev from Al-Karma, on a contract until the end of the season.

On 15 July, Istiklol announced the return of Shervoni Mabatshoyev and Ehson Panjshanbe, both from Terengganu to one-year contracts.

On 29 July, Istiklol announced that Ivan Zotko, Dmytro Bilonoh, Luka Zgursky and Frane Čirjak had all left the club by mutual agreement, whilst Khusrav Toirov had returned to Shakhtar Donetsk after his loan was also ended.

On 30 July, Istiklol announced the return of Vahdat Hanonov to the club, and the signings of Mikhail Tikhonov and Oleksiy Shchebetun.

== Squad ==
As of match played 7 November 2026

No.	Name	Nationality	Position	Date of birth (age)	Signed from	Signed in	Contract ends	Apps.	Goals
Goalkeepers
22	Muzaffar Safaralii	(Tajikistan)	GK	26 September 2004 (age 22)	CSKA Pamir Dushanbe	2025	2027	0	0
78	Denis Kavlinov	(Russia)	GK	10 January 1995 (age 31)	Zhetysu	2026	2026	22	0
99	Mukhriddin Khasanov	(Tajikistan)	GK	23 September 2002 (age 24)	Khujand	2021		58	0
	Olimdzhon Dzhuraev	(Tajikistan)	GK	17 September 2003 (age 23)	Youth team	2022		0	0
Defenders
3	Tabrez Islomov	(Tajikistan)	DF	6 June 1998 (age 28)	Narva Trans	2022		205	4
5	Sodikdzhon Kurbonov	(Tajikistan)	DF	19 January 2003 (age 23)	Dynamo Dushanbe	2023		89	5
21	Romish Jalilov	(Tajikistan)	DF	21 November 1995 (age 30)	Khosilot Farkhor	2025		152+	20
23	Alidzhon Karomatullozoda	(Tajikistan)	DF	5 May 2002 (age 24)	Ravshan Kulob	2026		68	2
26	Frane Ikić	(Croatia)	DF	19 June 1994 (age 32)	Bukhara	2026	2026	21	3
44	Mustafo Khasanbekov	(Tajikistan)	DF	29 January 2009 (age 17)	Academy	2024		5	0
50	Josip Tomašević	(Croatia)	DF	4 March 1994 (age 32)	Bukhara	2026	2026	17	0
55	Manuchekhr Safarov	(Tajikistan)	DF	31 May 2001 (age 25)	Neftchi Fergana	2025	2026	53	8
66	Vahdat Hanonov	(Tajikistan)	DF	25 July 2000 (age 26)	Sepahan	2026		54	8
77	Mikhail Tikhonov	(Russia)	DF	17 July 1998 (age 28)	Unattached	2026	2026	7	0
Midfielders
6	Amirbek Juraboev	(Tajikistan)	MF	13 April 1996 (age 30)	Kedah Darul Aman	2024	2026	213	20
10	Alisher Dzhalilov	(Tajikistan)	MF	29 August 1993 (age 33)	AGMK	2023		189	71
11	Mukhammadzhon Rakhimov	(Tajikistan)	MF	15 October 1998 (age 28)	Ravshan Kulob	2025		188	31
12	Mehrubon Odilzoda	(Tajikistan)	MF	15 September 2009 (age 17)	Academy	2025		8	0
14	Alisher Shukurov	(Tajikistan)	MF	30 March 2002 (age 24)	Qizilqum	2026		11	2
17	Ehson Panjshanbe	(Tajikistan)	MF	12 May 1999 (age 27)	Terengganu	2026	2027	187	42
88	Shervoni Mabatshoyev	(Tajikistan)	MF	4 December 2000 (age 25)	Terengganu	2026	2027	128	35
	Alidzhoni Ayni	(Tajikistan)	MF	6 August 2004 (age 22)	Samgurali Tskaltubo	2026		23	1
Forwards
8	Oleksiy Shchebetun	(Ukraine)	FW	2 June 1997 (age 29)	Qizilqum	2026		11	0
9	Rustam Soirov	(Tajikistan)	FW	12 September 2002 (age 24)	Lokomotiv Tashkent	2024	2027	143	52
20	Daler Sharipov	(Tajikistan)	FW	13 February 2004 (age 22)	Khujand	2026	2026	18	4
63	Shahrom Samiev	(Tajikistan)	FW	8 February 2001 (age 25)	Al-Karma	2026	2026	40	11
80	Masrur Gafurov	(Tajikistan)	FW	21 January 2006 (age 20)	Barkchi Hisor	2025	2027	25	3
Youth Team
	Husein Qurbanov	(Tajikistan)	DF		Academy	2024		1	0
	Akhmadzhon Shoev	(Tajikistan)	DF	1 August 2008 (age 18)	Academy	2024		1	0
	Ramazon Bakhtaliev	(Tajikistan)	MF	24 October 2008 (age 18)	Academy	2024		1	0
	Parviz Bobonazarov	(Tajikistan)	MF	4 January 2009 (age 17)	Academy	2024		1	0
	Muboriz Miskinshoev	(Tajikistan)	MF	23 February 2008 (age 18)	Academy	2024		0	0
	Muhammad Rajabov	(Tajikistan)	MF		Academy	2024		1	0
	Mukhammadzhon Tokhiri	(Tajikistan)	FW	15 September 2006 (age 20)	Barkchi	2024		0	0
Away on loan
12	Mukhammad Nazriev	(Tajikistan)	FW	23 October 2008 (age 18)	Academy	2025		7	0
66	Rustam Kamolov	(Tajikistan)	DF	4 June 2007 (age 19)	Youth Team	2022		20	1
Left during the season
7	Dmytro Bilonoh	(Ukraine)	FW	26 May 1995 (age 31)	Vakhsh Bokhtar	2026	2026	12	2
8	Luka Zgursky	(Russia)	FW	5 December 2005 (age 20)	Atyrau	2026	2026	8	1
13	Ivan Zotko	(Ukraine)	DF	9 July 1996 (age 30)	Uzgen	2026	2026	10	0
25	Frane Čirjak	(Croatia)	MF	23 June 1995 (age 31)	Bukhara	2026	2026	10	0
77	Khusrav Toirov	(Tajikistan)	MF	1 August 2004 (age 22)	on loan from Shakhtar Donetsk	2026	2026	6	0

== Transfers ==
=== In ===
Date	Position	Nationality	Name	From	Fee	Ref.
14 January 2026	DF	(Tajikistan)	Alidzhon Karomatullozoda	Ravshan Kulob	Undisclosed	
20 January 2026	MF	(Ukraine)	Dmytro Bilonoh	Vakhsh Bokhtar	Undisclosed	
4 February 2026	FW	(Tajikistan)	Daler Sharipov	Khujand	Undisclosed	
8 February 2026	DF	(Croatia)	Frane Ikić	Bukhara	Undisclosed	
8 February 2026	DF	(Croatia)	Josip Tomašević	Bukhara	Undisclosed	
8 February 2026	MF	(Croatia)	Frane Čirjak	Bukhara	Undisclosed	
12 February 2026	DF	(Ukraine)	Ivan Zotko	Uzgen	Undisclosed	
14 February 2026	FW	(Russia)	Luka Zgursky	Atyrau	Undisclosed	
25 February 2026	GK	(Russia)	Denis Kavlinov	Zhetysu	Undisclosed	
5 March 2026	MF	(Tajikistan)	Alidzhoni Ayni	Samgurali Tskaltubo	Undisclosed	
14 July 2026	MF	(Tajikistan)	Alisher Shukurov	Qizilqum	Undisclosed	
14 July 2026	FW	(Tajikistan)	Shahrom Samiev	Al-Karma	Undisclosed	
15 July 2026	MF	(Tajikistan)	Shervoni Mabatshoyev	Terengganu	Undisclosed	
15 July 2026	MF	(Tajikistan)	Ehson Panjshanbe	Terengganu	Undisclosed	
30 July 2026	DF	(Tajikistan)	Vahdat Hanonov	Sepahan	Undisclosed	
30 July 2026	DF	(Russia)	Mikhail Tikhonov	Unattached	Free	
30 July 2026	FW	(Ukraine)	Oleksiy Shchebetun	Qizilqum	Undisclosed	

=== Loans in ===
Date	Position	Nationality	Name	From	Fee	Ref.
18 February 2026	MF	(Tajikistan)	Khusrav Toirov	Shakhtar Donetsk	29 July 2026	

=== Out ===
Date	Position	Nationality	Name	To	Fee	Ref.
4 March 2026	MF	(Tajikistan)	Shahrom Sulaymonov	Khosilot Farkhor	Undisclosed	

=== Loans out ===
Date	Position	Nationality	Name	To	Fee	Ref.
28 July 2026	DF	(Tajikistan)	Rustam Kamolov	Barkchi Hisor	End of season	
28 July 2026	FW	(Tajikistan)	Mukhammad Nazriev	Sardor	End of season	

=== Released ===
Date	Position	Nationality	Name	Joined	Date	Ref
13 February 2026	DF	(Russia)	Kirill Suslov	Chernomorets Novorossiysk	19 February 2026	
2 March 2026	FW	(Tajikistan)	Manuchekhr Dzhalilov	Retirement	2 March 2026	
29 July 2026	DF	(Ukraine)	Ivan Zotko	Meshakhte Tkibuli	29 August 2026	
29 July 2026	MF	(Croatia)	Frane Čirjak	HNK Orijent	9 October 2026	
29 July 2026	FW	(Russia)	Luka Zgursky	Belshina Bobruisk	22 August 2026	
29 July 2026	FW	(Ukraine)	Dmytro Bilonoh	Alga Bishkek	18 August 2026	

== Friendlies ==
20 January 2026	Istiklol	3–0	Khosilot Farkhor	Dushanbe
(UTC+5)	Sharipov 15'; Soirov 30', 80'	Report		Stadium: Pamir Stadium

31 January 2026	Istiklol	2–2	Vakhsh Bokhtar	Dushanbe
16:00 (UTC+5)	Gafurov 11' (pen.); Rakhimov 42'	Report	Ismoilov 9'; Nazarov 45+1'	Stadium: Pamir Stadium; Referee: Sayyodjon Zainiddinov

7 February 2026	Istiklol	2–1	Regar-TadAZ	Dushanbe
(UTC+5)	Bilonoh 21'; Trialist 70'	Report	Pandzhiev 65'	Stadium: Pamir Stadium

11 February 2026	Istiklol	2–0	Tajikistan U20	Dushanbe
14:00 (UTC+5)	Sharipov 52'; Trialist 78'	Report		Stadium: Pamir Stadium

15 February 2026	Istiklol	2–0	Istaravshan	Dushanbe
(UTC+5)	Islomov 20'; Čirjak 80' (pen.)	Report		Stadium: Pamir Stadium

19 February 2026	Istiklol	1–1	Ravshan Kulob	Dushanbe
16:00 (UTC+5)	Zgursky 24'	Report	Firsov 32'	Stadium: Pamir Stadium

28 February 2026	Istiklol	1–1	Khosilot Farkhor	Dushanbe
16:00 (UTC+5)	Soirov 30'	Report	Irgashev 60'	Stadium: Pamir Stadium; Referee: Nasrullo Kabirov

18 July 2026	Yaipan	2–2	Istiklol	Tashkent, Uzbekistan
20:00 (UTC+5)	Shokirov 45+1', 50'	Report	Ikić 52'; Soirov 60'	Stadium: Uzbekistan National Team Training Center; Referee: Rinat Serazetdinov

22 July 2026	Guliston	1–1	Istiklol	Tashkent, Uzbekistan
19:15 (UTC+5)	Sobirjonov 20'	Report	Mabatshoyev 52'	Stadium: Uzbekistan National Team Training Center; Referee: Samandar Narzikulov

27 July 2026	Bunyodkor U21	0–2	Istiklol	Tashkent, Uzbekistan
19:00 (UTC+5)		Report	Mabatshoyev 24'; Samiev 86'	Stadium: Uzbekistan National Team Training Center; Referee: Samandar Narzikulov

== Competitions ==
=== Overview ===
Competition	First match	Last match	Starting round	Final position	Record							
Competition	First match	Last match	Starting round	Final position	Pld	W	D	L	GF	GA	GD	Win %
Higher League	7 March 2026	27 November 2026	Matchday 1		20	13	5	2	25	6	+19	65.00
Tajikistan Cup	29 May 2026	21 June 2026	Last 16	Last 16	2	1	0	1	2	3	−1	50.00
Tajik Super Cup	23 May 2026	23 May 2026	Final	Runnersup	1	0	0	1	1	2	−1	0.00
AFC Challenge League	17 October 2026	23 October 2026	Group Stage	Group Stage	3	1	0	2	2	3	−1	33.33
Total					26	15	5	6	30	14	+16	57.69

Last updated: 7 November 2026
Source: Competitions

=== Tajik Supercup ===
23 May 2026	Istiklol	1–2	Regar-TadAZ	Hisar
19:00 (UTC+5)	Rakhimov 50'; Zotko (yellow card); Islomov (yellow card)	Report	Khaitov 7'; Nozimov 31'; Feumba (yellow card); Makhamadiev (yellow card)	Stadium: Central Stadium; Attendance: Bakhtiyor Komilov; Referee: 8,374

=== Higher League ===
==== Regular season ====
===== Results summary =====
Overall								Home						Away					
Pld	W	D	L	GF	GA	GD	Pts	W	D	L	GF	GA	GD	W	D	L	GF	GA	GD
20	13	5	2	26	6	+20	44	7	3	0	14	2	+12	6	2	2	12	4	+8

Last updated: 7 November 2026.
Source: See Results

===== Results by round =====
Round	1	2	3	4	5	6	7	8	9	11	12	12	13	14	15	16	17	20	19	20	21	22
Ground	H	H	H	H	A	H	A	H	A	A	A	A	H	A	A	H	A	H	A	H	A	H
Result	D	W	D	W	D	W	W	W	D	W	W	L	W	W	W	W	L	D	W	W		
Position	7	5	4	1	3	2	2	2	2	1	1	3	1	1	2	1	1	2	2	1		

Source: Results
A = Away; H = Home; W = Win; D = Draw; L = Loss; P = Postponed

===== Results =====
7 March 2026 1	Istiklol	0–0	Sardor	Dushanbe
16:00 (UTC+5)	Tomašević (yellow card); Zgursky (yellow card); Zotko (yellow card)	Report	Sultanov (yellow card); Payzov (yellow card); Azimov (yellow card)	Stadium: Markazii Jumhuriyavii Stadium; Referee: Amirjon Khorkashev

14 March 2026 2	Istiklol	1–0	Regar-TadAZ	Dushanbe
19:00 (UTC+5)	Zgursky 7'; Čirjak (yellow card); Tomašević (yellow card)	Report	Melikmurodov (yellow card)	Stadium: Markazii Jumhuriyavii Stadium; Referee: Rustam Nurmatov

5 April 2026 3	Istiklol	0–0	Ravshan Kulob	Hisar
18:00 (UTC+5)	Karomatullozoda (yellow card); Dzhalilov (yellow card); Islomov (yellow card); Soirov (yellow card)	Report	Milovanović (yellow card); Olimzoda (yellow card); Sharifi (yellow card); Kovussho (yellow card); Azizboev (yellow card); Rozikov (yellow card); Salimshoev (yellow card)	Stadium: Central Stadium; Referee: Khurshed Dadabayev

12 April 2026 4	Istiklol	3–0	Parvoz	Dushanbe
18:00 (UTC+5)	Juraboev (penalty missed) 35'; Gafurov 45'; Safarov 59' (yellow card); Sharipov 63'; Zotko (yellow card); Kurbonov (yellow card)	Report	Izzatshoev (red card) 28'; Habibulloev (yellow card); Rustamzoda (yellow card)	Stadium: Markazii Jumhuriyavii Stadium; Referee: Kurbonmurod Sharipov

19 April 2026 5	Khosilot Farkhor	1–1	Istiklol	Farkhor
17:00 (UTC+5)	Irgashev 90+5'; Sharipov (yellow card); Kassim (yellow card); Gatten (yellow card)	Report	Rakhimov 23'; Dzhalilov (yellow card); Tomašević (yellow card)	Stadium: Central Stadium; Attendance: 6,760; Referee: Nasrullo Kvbirov

24 April 2026 6	Istiklol	2–1	Khujand	Dushanbe
18:00 (UTC+5)	Rakhimov 24'; Juraboev (penalty missed) 34'; Soirov 90+1'; Tomašević (yellow card)	Report	Gigić 59' (yellow card); J.Ergashev (yellow card); D.Ergashev (yellow card)	Stadium: Markazii Jumhuriyavii Stadium; Referee: Sayyodjon Zainiddinov

3 May 2026 7	Vakhsh Bokhtar	0–2	Istiklol	Bokhtar
18:00 (UTC+5)	Khamrokulov (yellow card); Barotov (yellow card)	Report	Soirov 49'; Kurbonov 90+7'; Islomov (yellow card); Kavlinov (yellow card); Sharipov (yellow card)	Stadium: Vakhsh Stadium; Attendance: 8,400; Referee: Gulmurodi Sa'dullo

9 May 2026 8	Istiklol	2–0	Barkchi Hisor	Dushanbe
18:00 (UTC+5)	Ikić 15', 61'; Rakhimov (yellow card)	Report	Jamshedzoda (yellow card)	Stadium: Markazii Jumhuriyavii Stadium; Referee: Sayyodjon Zainiddinov

16 May 2026 9	Eskhata	0–0	Istiklol	Khujand
19:00 (UTC+5)	Saburov (yellow card); Prokhorov (yellow card)	Report	Kurbonov (yellow card) (yellow-red card) 55'; Soirov (yellow card)	Stadium: 20 Years of Independence Stadium; Referee: Amirjon Khorkashev

14 June 2026 11	Istaravshan	1–2	Istiklol	Istaravshan
19:00 (UTC+5)	Kavlinov 90+2' (o.g.); Inoyatov (yellow card); Ergashev (yellow card)	Report	Rakhimov 45+1'; Sharipov 45+3'; Tomašević (yellow card); Karomatullozoda (yellow card); Čirjak (yellow card)	Stadium: Istaravshan Arena; Attendance: 9,100; Referee: Rustam Nurmatov

28 June 2026 12	Sardor	0–1	Istiklol	Tursunzoda
19:00 (UTC+5)	Zokirov (yellow card); Ishokov (yellow card)	Report	Sharipov 14' (yellow card); Čirjak (yellow card); Islomov (yellow card)	Stadium: TALKO-Arena; Attendance: 2,200; Referee: Kurbanmurod Sharipov

2 August 2026 13	Regar-TadAZ	1–0	Istiklol	Tursunzoda
19:00 (UTC+5)	Mbollo 27'; Babadjanov (yellow card); Feumba (yellow card)	Report	Rakhimov (yellow card); Panjshanbe (yellow card)	Stadium: TALCO Arena; Attendance: 4,050; Referee: Bakhtiyor Komilov

9 August 2026 10	Istiklol	3–1	CSKA Pamir Dushanbe	Hisar
19:00 (UTC+5)	Dzhalilov 54'; Juraboev 68'; Islomov 90+5'; Ikić (yellow card)	Report	Ruziev (red card) 36'; Ibrokhimov 45'	Stadium: Central Stadium; Referee: Abdullo Davlatov
Note: Match original scheduled for 27 May.

15 August 2026 14	Ravshan Kulob	0–1	Istiklol	Hisar
19:00 (UTC+5)	Milovanovic (yellow card); Olimzoda (yellow card); Okpala (yellow card) Hanonov (yellow card); Juraboev (yellow card); Islomov (yellow card)	Report	Ikić 90+5'	Stadium: Central Stadium; Referee: Nasrullo Kabirov

30 August 2026 15	Parvoz	0–4	Istiklol	Khujand
17:00 (UTC+5)	Queku (yellow card)	Report	Soirov 69', 84' (pen.); Panjshanbe 73' (yellow card); Juraboev 90+2'; Karomatullozoda (yellow card); Hanonov (yellow card); Rakhimov (yellow card); Mabatshoyev (yellow card)	Stadium: Spartak Stadium; Attendance: 1,700; Referee: Rustam Nurmatov

5 September 2026 16	Istiklol	1–0	Khosilot Farkhor	Hisar
18:00 (UTC+5)	Hanonov (red card) 48'; Panjshanbe 88'; Ikić (yellow card); Juraboev (yellow card); Mabatshoyev (yellow card)	Report	Kassim (red card) 24'; Namozov (red card) 88'; Litfullaev (yellow card)	Stadium: Central Stadium; Referee: Khurshed Dadoboev

15 September 2026 17	Khujand	1–0	Istiklol	Khujand
16:30 (UTC+5)	Ergashev 83'; Ergashev (yellow card)	Report	Karomatullozoda (yellow card); Shukurov (yellow card)	Stadium: Spartak Stadium; Attendance: 3,500; Referee: Rustam Nurmatov

28 October 2026 20	Istiklol	1–1	Eskhata	Dushanbe
17:00 (UTC+5)	Sharipov 63'		Mukhin 43'	Stadium: Markazii Jumhuriyavii Stadium

2 November 2026 21	CSKA Pamir Dushanbe	0–1	Istiklol	Dushanbe
16:00 (UTC+5)	Muhammad (yellow card)	Report	Rakhimov 89' (yellow card); Karomatullozoda (yellow card)	Stadium: Markazii Jumhuriyavii Stadium; Attendance: 1,000; Referee: Khurshed Dadabaev

7 November 2026 18	Istiklol	1–0	Vakhsh Bokhtar	Dushanbe
16:00 (UTC+5)	Shukurov 78'; Islomov (yellow card)	Report	Tskanyan (yellow card); Yavorskyi (yellow card); Naskov (yellow card)	Stadium: Markazii Jumhuriyavii Stadium; Attendance: 1,200; Referee: Amirjon Khorkashev
Note: Match originally scheduled for 10 October 2026.

23 November 2026 19	Barkchi Hisor	–	Istiklol
16:00 (UTC+5)

27 November 2026 22	Istiklol	–	Istaravshan
16:00 (UTC+5)

===== League table =====
Pos	Team	Pld	W	D	L	GF	GA	GD	Pts	Qualification or relegation
1	Istiklol (A)	20	13	5	2	26	7	+19	44	Qualification for the AFC Champions League Two preliminary stage
2	Regar-TadAZ (A)	21	12	7	2	28	12	+16	43	Qualification for the 2027 Silk Way Cup group stage
3	Khosilot Farkhor (Q)	21	10	6	5	36	23	+13	36	Qualification for the 2027 Silk Way Cup qualifying round
4	Khujand (Q)	21	8	8	5	19	14	+5	32	Qualification for the AFC Challenge League group stage (Note: As winners of the 2026 Tajikistan Cup)
5	CSKA Pamir	21	9	4	8	23	24	−1	31	

Updated to match(es) played on 7 November 2026. Source: Soccerway
Rules for classification: 1) Points; 2) Head-to-head points; 3) Head-to-head goal difference; 4) Head-to-head goals scored away; 5) Goal difference; 6) Goals scored.
(A) Advance to a further round; (Q) Qualified for the phase indicated

=== Tajikistan Cup ===
29 May 2026 Last 16 1st leg	Khujand	3–1	Istiklol	Khujand
19:30 (UTC+5)	Eskić 9' (yellow card); Anđelković 47'; J.Ergashev 57'; Akhmadzoda (yellow card); Gigić (yellow card); D.Ergashev (yellow card)	Report	Bilonoh 66'; Khasanbekov (yellow card); Rakhimov (yellow card); Karomatullozoda (yellow card)	Stadium: 20 Years of Independence Stadium; Attendance: 3,000; Referee: Sayyodjon Zainiddinov

21 June 2026 Last 16 2nd leg	Istiklol	1–0 (2–3 agg.)	Khujand	Dushanbe
19:00 (UTC+5)	Bilonoh 4'; Rakhimov (yellow card)	Report	Gigić (yellow card); Ergashev (yellow card)	Stadium: Markazii Jumhuriyavii Stadium; Referee: Nasrullo Kabirov

=== AFC Challenge League ===
==== Group stage ====
Pos	Team	Pld	W	D	L	GF	GA	GD	Pts	Qualification
1	(Syria) Homs Al-Fidaa	3	3	0	0	5	1	+4	9	Quarter-finals
2	(Lebanon) Nejmeh	3	2	0	1	5	3	+2	6	
3	(Tajikistan) Istiklol (H)	3	1	0	2	2	3	−1	3	
4	(Kuwait) Al-Arabi	3	0	0	3	1	6	−5	0	

Source: AFC
Rules for classification: Group stage tiebreakers
(H) Hosts

17 October 2026 1	Nejmeh (Lebanon)	1–0	(Tajikistan) Istiklol	Hisar, Tajikistan
19:00 (UTC+5)	Gbadamosi 21'; Knani (yellow card) 47'; Hallal (yellow card) 83'	Report	Samiev (yellow card) 82'; Dzhalilov (yellow card) 87'	Stadium: Central Stadium; Attendance: 5,350; Referee: Amir Arab Baraghi (Iran)

20 October 2026 2	Istiklol (Tajikistan)	2–0	(Kuwait) Al-Arabi	Hisar, Tajikistan
19:00 (UTC+5)	Soirov 38'; Panjshanbe (yellow card) 68'; Shukurov 85'; Ikić (yellow card) 90+4'	Report	Abboud (yellow card) 90+4'	Stadium: Central Stadium; Attendance: 5,120; Referee: Sekaran Senthilnathan (India)

23 October 2026 3	Istiklol (Tajikistan)	0–2	(Syria) Homs Al Fidaa	Hisar, Tajikistan
19:00 (UTC+5)	Karomatullozoda (red card) 22'; Kurbonov (yellow card) 38'	Report	Atsama (yellow card) 38'; Alghoul 47'; Al Rifai 89'	Stadium: Central Stadium; Attendance: 6,330; Referee: Naufal Adya Fairuski (Indonesia)

== Squad statistics ==
As of match played 7 November 2026

=== Appearances and goals ===
No.	Pos	Nat	Player	Total		Higher League		Tajikistan Cup		Super Cup		AFC Challenge League	
No.	Pos	Nat	Player	Apps	Goals	Apps	Goals	Apps	Goals	Apps	Goals	Apps	Goals
3	DF	(Tajikistan) TJK	Tabrez Islomov	24	1	15+3	1	2	0	1	0	3	0
5	DF	(Tajikistan) TJK	Sodikdzhon Kurbonov	18	1	9+5	1	2	0	0	0	2	0
6	MF	(Tajikistan) TJK	Amirbek Juraboev	25	1	18+1	1	2	0	1	0	3	0
8	FW	(Ukraine) UKR	Oleksiy Shchebetun	11	0	6+3	0	0	0	0	0	1+1	0
9	FW	(Tajikistan) TJK	Rustam Soirov	23	5	10+8	4	0+1	0	1	0	2+1	1
10	MF	(Tajikistan) TJK	Alisher Dzhalilov	20	1	13+2	1	1	0	1	0	3	0
11	MF	(Tajikistan) TJK	Mukhammadzhon Rakhimov	24	5	13+6	4	2	0	1	1	0+2	0
12	MF	(Tajikistan) TJK	Mehrubon Odilzoda	4	0	0+2	0	0	0	0	0	0+2	0
14	MF	(Tajikistan) TJK	Alisher Shukurov	11	2	6+2	1	0	0	0	0	1+2	1
17	MF	(Tajikistan) TJK	Ehson Panjshanbe	11	2	8	2	0	0	0	0	3	0
20	FW	(Tajikistan) TJK	Daler Sharipov	18	4	8+8	4	2	0	0	0	0	0
23	DF	(Tajikistan) TJK	Alidzhon Karomatullozoda	24	0	18	0	2	0	1	0	3	0
26	DF	(Croatia) CRO	Frane Ikić	21	3	14+2	3	1	0	1	0	3	0
44	DF	(Tajikistan) TJK	Mustafo Khasanbekov	4	0	0+2	0	1	0	0+1	0	0	0
50	DF	(Croatia) CRO	Josip Tomašević	17	0	12+2	0	1+1	0	1	0	0	0
55	DF	(Tajikistan) TJK	Manuchekhr Safarov	7	1	7	1	0	0	0	0	0	0
63	FW	(Tajikistan) TJK	Shahrom Samiev	11	0	2+7	0	0	0	0	0	0+2	0
66	DF	(Tajikistan) TJK	Vahdat Hanonov	10	0	6+1	0	0	0	0	0	3	0
77	DF	(Russia) RUS	Mikhail Tikhonov	7	0	3+3	0	0	0	0	0	0+1	0
78	GK	(Russia) RUS	Denis Kavlinov	22	0	16	0	2	0	1	0	3	0
80	FW	(Tajikistan) TJK	Masrur Gafurov	5	1	1+4	1	0	0	0	0	0	0
88	MF	(Tajikistan) TJK	Shervoni Mabatshoyev	12	0	9	0	0	0	0	0	3	0
99	GK	(Tajikistan) TJK	Mukhriddin Khasanov	4	0	4	0	0	0	0	0	0	0
	MF	(Tajikistan) TJK	Alidzhoni Ayni	2	0	1+1	0	0	0	0	0	0	0
Players away from Istiklol on loan:
12	FW	(Tajikistan) TJK	Mukhammad Nazriev	1	0	0+1	0	0	0	0	0	0	0
66	DF	(Tajikistan) TJK	Rustam Kamolov	2	0	0+2	0	0	0	0	0	0	0
Players who left Istiklol during the season:
7	FW	(Ukraine) UKR	Dmytro Bilonoh	12	2	4+5	0	1+1	2	0+1	0	0	0
8	FW	(Russia) RUS	Luka Zgursky	8	1	3+3	1	0+2	0	0	0	0	0
13	DF	(Ukraine) UKR	Ivan Zotko	10	0	7+1	0	1	0	1	0	0	0
25	MF	(Croatia) CRO	Frane Čirjak	10	0	7	0	2	0	1	0	0	0
77	MF	(Tajikistan) TJK	Khusrav Toirov	6	0	0+3	0	0+2	0	0+1	0	0	0

=== Goal scorers ===
Place	Position	Nation	Number	Name	Higher League	Tajikistan Cup	Super Cup	AFC Challenge League	Total
1	MF	(Tajikistan)	11	Mukhammadzhon Rakhimov	4	0	1	0	5
1	FW	(Tajikistan)	9	Rustam Soirov	4	0	0	1	5
3	FW	(Tajikistan)	20	Daler Sharipov	4	0	0	0	4
4	DF	(Croatia)	26	Frane Ikić	3	0	0	0	3
5	MF	(Tajikistan)	6	Amirbek Juraboev	2	0	0	0	2
5	MF	(Tajikistan)	17	Ehson Panjshanbe	2	0	0	0	2
5	MF	(Tajikistan)	14	Alisher Shukurov	1	0	0	1	2
5	FW	(Ukraine)	7	Dmytro Bilonoh	0	2	0	0	2
9	FW	(Russia)	8	Luka Zgursky	1	0	0	0	1
9	FW	(Tajikistan)	80	Masrur Gafurov	1	0	0	0	1
9	DF	(Tajikistan)	55	Manuchekhr Safarov	1	0	0	0	1
9	DF	(Tajikistan)	5	Sodikdzhon Kurbonov	1	0	0	0	1
9	MF	(Tajikistan)	10	Alisher Dzhalilov	1	0	0	0	1
9	DF	(Tajikistan)	3	Tabrez Islomov	1	0	0	0	1
TOTALS					26	2	1	2	31

=== Clean sheets ===
Place	Position	Nation	Number	Name	Higher League	Tajikistan Cup	Super Cup	AFC Challenge League	Total
1	GK	(Russia)	78	Denis Kavlinov	10	1	0	1	12
2	GK	(Tajikistan)	99	Mukhriddin Khasanov	3	0	0	0	3
TOTALS					13	1	0	1	15

=== Disciplinary record ===
Number	Nation	Position	Name	Higher League		Tajikistan Cup		Super Cup		AFC Challenge League		Total	
Number	Nation	Position	Name	Yellow card	Red card	Yellow card	Red card	Yellow card	Red card	Yellow card	Red card	Yellow card	Red card
3	(Tajikistan)	DF	Tabrez Islomov	5	0	0	0	1	0	0	0	6	0
5	(Tajikistan)	DF	Sodikdzhon Kurbonov	3	1	0	0	0	0	1	0	4	1
6	(Tajikistan)	MF	Amirbek Juraboev	3	0	0	0	0	0	0	0	3	0
9	(Tajikistan)	FW	Rustam Soirov	2	0	0	0	0	0	0	0	2	0
10	(Tajikistan)	MF	Alisher Dzhalilov	2	0	0	0	0	0	1	0	3	0
11	(Tajikistan)	MF	Mukhammadzhon Rakhimov	4	0	2	0	0	0	0	0	6	0
14	(Tajikistan)	MF	Alisher Shukurov	1	0	0	0	0	0	0	0	1	0
17	(Tajikistan)	MF	Ehson Panjshanbe	2	0	0	0	0	0	1	0	3	0
20	(Tajikistan)	FW	Daler Sharipov	2	0	0	0	0	0	0	0	2	0
23	(Tajikistan)	DF	Alidzhon Karomatullozoda	5	0	1	0	0	0	2	1	8	1
26	(Croatia)	DF	Frane Ikić	2	0	0	0	0	0	1	0	3	0
44	(Tajikistan)	DF	Mustafa Kasanbekov	0	0	1	0	0	0	0	0	1	0
50	(Croatia)	DF	Josip Tomašević	5	0	0	0	0	0	0	0	5	0
55	(Tajikistan)	DF	Manuchekhr Safarov	1	0	0	0	0	0	0	0	1	0
63	(Tajikistan)	FW	Shahrom Samiev	0	0	0	0	0	0	1	0	1	0
66	(Tajikistan)	DF	Vahdat Hanonov	2	1	0	0	0	0	0	0	2	1
77	(Russia)	DF	Mikhail Tikhonov	1	0	0	0	0	0	0	0	1	0
78	(Russia)	GK	Denis Kavlinov	1	0	0	0	0	0	0	0	1	0
88	(Tajikistan)	MF	Shervoni Mabatshoyev	2	0	0	0	0	0	0	0	2	0
Players who left Istiklol during the season:
8	(Russia)	FW	Luka Zgursky	1	0	0	0	0	0	0	0	1	0
13	(Ukraine)	DF	Ivan Zotko	2	0	0	0	1	0	0	0	3	0
25	(Croatia)	MF	Frane Čirjak	3	0	0	0	0	0	0	0	3	0
			TOTALS	47	2	4	0	2	0	7	1	60	3
