= 2026 Tajik Super Cup =

- Event: Tajik Supercup
Istiklol	Regar-TadAZ
1	2
- Date: 23 May 2026
- Venue: Central Stadium, Hisar
- Referee: Bakhtiyor Komilov (Kulob)
- Attendance: 8,374

The 2026 Tajik Supercup was the 17th Tajik Supercup, an annual Tajik football match played between the winners of the previous season's Tajikistan Higher League and Tajikistan Cup. The match was contested by 2025 League champions Istiklol, and Cup Champions Regar-TadAZ.

== Match ==
=== Summary ===
Regar-TadAZ took the lead through a Azizbek Khaitov in the 7th minute, before extending their lead in the 31st minute through Abdurakhmon Nozimov. In the second half, Mukhammadzhon Rakhimov pulled one goal back for Istiklol in the 50th minute, however it wasn't enough to prevent Regar-TadAZ from winning their first Tajik Super Cup title.

=== Details ===
23 May 2025
19:00 (UTC+5)

Istiklol	1–2	Regar-TadAZ
Rakhimov 50'	Report	Khaitov 7'; Nozimov 31'

Central Stadium, Hisar
Attendance: 8,374
Referee: Bakhtiyor Komilov (Kulob)

Istiklol	Regar-TadAZ

GK	78	(Russia)	Denis Kavlinov
DF	3	(Tajikistan)	Tabrez Islomov	Booked
DF	13	(Ukraine)	Ivan Zotko	Booked	(substituted off) 80'
DF	23	(Tajikistan)	Alidzhon Karomatullozoda
DF	26	(Croatia)	Frane Ikić
DF	50	(Croatia)	Josip Tomašević		(substituted off) 36'
MF	25	(Croatia)	Frane Čirjak		(substituted off) 80'
MF	6	(Tajikistan)	Amirbek Juraboev
MF	10	(Tajikistan)	Alisher Dzhalilov
MF	11	(Tajikistan)	Mukhammadzhon Rakhimov
FW	9	(Tajikistan)	Rustam Soirov
Substitutes:
GK	99	(Tajikistan)	Mukhriddin Khasanov
FW	7	(Ukraine)	Dmytro Bilonoh		(substituted on) 80'
FW	8	(Russia)	Luka Zgursky
FW	12	(Tajikistan)	Mukhammad Nazriev
MF	14	(Tajikistan)	Mekhrubon Odilzoda
FW	20	(Tajikistan)	Daler Sharipov
DF	44	(Tajikistan)	Mustafo Khasanbekov		(substituted on) 36'
DF	66	(Tajikistan)	Rustam Kamolov
MF	77	(Tajikistan)	Khusrav Toirov		(substituted on) 80'
Manager:
(Tajikistan) Vitaly Levchenko

GK	38	(Cameroon)	Takam Takam
DF	27	(Tajikistan)	Daler Imomnazarov
DF	44	(Cameroon)	Joseph Feumba	Booked
DF	66	(Uzbekistan)	Asilbek Temirov
DF	74	(Tajikistan)	Sorbon Giyosov
MF	6	(Cameroon)	David Atsam
MF	7	(Tajikistan)	Azizbek Haitov
MF	11	(Tajikistan)	Faridun Davlatov
MF	13	(Tajikistan)	Nozim Babadjanov
MF	88	(Tajikistan)	Abdurahmon Nazimov
FW	99	(Cameroon)	Ngolo Abbamo
Substitutes:
MF	1	(Tajikistan)	Shakhobiddin Makhmudzoda
MF	2	(Tajikistan)	Abdusmad Melikmurodov
MF	8	(Tajikistan)	Saidmukhtor Azimov
FW	9	(Tajikistan)	Amirdzhon Safarov
MF	12	(Ghana)	Prince Arthur
MF	18	(Tajikistan)	Abdullo Sharipov
MF	20	(Tajikistan)	Ozodbek Pandzhiev
FW	21	(Tajikistan)	Dilovarshoh Ganiev
MF	70	(Tajikistan)	Sherzod Makhamadiev	Booked	Substituted on
Manager:
(Tajikistan) Alisher Tukhtaev

Man of the Match:
Assistant referees:
Sorbon Ahmadzoda (Kulob)
Tohiri Bahrom (Kulob)
Fourth official:
Amirjon Khorkashev
VAR:
Zuhal Khujanazarova
VAR assistant:
Ismoil Nuraliev

Match rules

- 90 minutes
- Penalty shoot-out if scores level
- Seven named substitutes
- Maximum of six substitutions

== See also ==
- 2025 Tajikistan Higher League
- 2025 Tajikistan Cup
