= 2026 Tajikistan Higher League =

Tajikistan Higher League
- Season: 2026
- Dates: 6 March 2026 - 27 November 2026
- Matches: 125
- Goals: 304 (2.43 per match)
- Biggest home win: Khosilot Farkhor 3–0 CSKA (6 March 2026); Sardor 3–0 Parvoz (13 March 2026); Istiklol 3–0 Parvoz (12 April 2026); Ravshan 4–1 Istaravshan (9 May 2026); Khujand 4–1 Ravshan (9 May 2026); Khosilot Farkhor 5–2 Istaravshan (2 August 2026); Regar-TadAZ 3–0 Parvoz (18 August 2026)
- Biggest away win: Eskhata 1–6 Khosilot Farkhor (13 June 2026)
- Highest scoring: Eskhata 4–3 Sardor (2 May 2026); Eskhata 1–6 Khosilot Farkhor (13 June 2026); Khosilot Farkhor 5–2 Istaravshan (2 August 2026)
- Longest winning run: CSKA (6)
- Longest unbeaten run: Istiklol (12); Regar-TadAZ (12)
- Longest winless run: Istaravshan (21)
- Longest losing run: Parvoz (4); Sardor (4); Istaravshan (4); CSKA (4)
- All statistics correct as of 7 November 2026.

The 2026 Tajikistan Top League (Tajik: 2026 Лигаи Олии Тоҷикистон, Russian: 2026 Высшая Лига Таджикистана), also known as Parimatch Higher League due to sponsorship reasons, is the 35th season of the Tajikistan Higher League, Tajikistan's top division of association football.

== Season events ==
On 5 January 2026, the Tajikistan Football Federation announced that 12 teams would take part in the upcoming season, with Sardor and Parvoz being promoted to the league in place of Hulbuk and Panjshir, with every team playing each other twice. The scheduled for the 2026 season was released on 23 February.

== Teams ==
Locations of teams in the 2026 Tajikistan Higher League

Team	Location	Venue	Capacity
Barkchi Hisor	Hisar	Central Stadium	3,000
CSKA Pamir	Dushanbe	CSKA Stadium	7,000
Eskhata	Khujand	Bistsolagii Istiqloliyati Stadium	20,000
Istaravshan	Istaravshan	Istaravshan-Arena	20,000
Istiklol	Dushanbe	Central Republican Stadium	24,000
Khosilot Farkhor	Farkhor	Central Stadium	
Khujand	Khujand	Bistsolagii Istiqloliyati Stadium	20,000
Parvoz	Khujand	Furudgoh Stadium	
Ravshan	Kulob	Kulob-Arena	
Regar-TadAZ	Tursunzoda	TALCO Arena	10,000
Sardor	Tursunzoda		
Vakhsh Bokhtar	Bokhtar	Stadium Vakhsh	10,000

=== Personnel and sponsoring ===
Team	Manager	Captain	Kit manufacturer	Sponsor
Barkchi Hisor	(Tajikistan) Alifbek Beromov			
CSKA Pamir	(Tajikistan) Faiz Davlatov		Kelme	Parimatch
Eskhata	(Tajikistan) Farrukh Marofiev			
Istaravshan	(Uzbekistan) Sherali Bobokulov		Kelme	
Istiklol	(Tajikistan) Vitaly Levchenko	(Tajikistan) Alisher Dzhalilov	Joma	
Khosilot Farkhor	(Tajikistan) Shamsiddin Kosimov			
Khujand	(Serbia) Milan Milanović			
Parvoz	(Tajikistan) Tokhirjon Muminov			
Ravshan Kulob	(Russia) Dmitri Cheryshev		Kelme	Hoji Sharif
Regar-TadAZ	(Tajikistan) Alisher Tukhtaev	(Tajikistan) Bakhtior Kalandarov	Jako	Talco
Sardor	(Tajikistan) Rustam Khojayev			
Vakhsh Bokhtar	(Tajikistan) Zarif Usmonov		Adidas	Safed Dara

=== Managerial changes ===
Team	Outgoing manager	Manner of departure	Date of vacancy	Position in table	Incoming manager	Date of appointment
CSKA Pamir Dushanbe	(Tajikistan) Tokhirdzon Muminov	End of contract		Preseason	(Spain) Juan Cortés	7 January 2026
Istiklol	(Tajikistan) Igor Cherevchenko	End of contract	27 December 2025	Preseason	(Tajikistan) Vitaly Levchenko	3 February 2026
Khujand	(Russia) Aleksandr Krestinin	End of contract		Preseason	(Serbia) Milan Milanović	29 December 2025
CSKA Pamir Dushanbe	(Spain) Juan Cortés	Leave of absence	13 March 2026	12th	(Tajikistan) Faiz Davlatov	14 April 2026

== Regular season ==
=== League table ===
Pos	Team	Pld	W	D	L	GF	GA	GD	Pts	Qualification or relegation
1	Istiklol (A)	20	13	5	2	26	7	+19	44	Qualification for the AFC Champions League Two preliminary stage
2	Regar-TadAZ (A)	21	12	7	2	28	12	+16	43	Qualification for the 2027 Silk Way Cup group stage
3	Khosilot Farkhor (Q)	22	10	7	5	37	24	+13	37	Qualification for the 2027 Silk Way Cup qualifying round
4	Khujand (Q)	21	8	8	5	19	14	+5	32	Qualification for the AFC Challenge League group stage (Note: As winners of the 2026 Tajikistan Cup)
5	CSKA Pamir	21	9	4	8	23	24	−1	31	
6	Ravshan Kulob	22	8	6	8	28	23	+5	30	
7	Vakhsh Bokhtar	22	7	9	6	32	27	+5	30	
8	Barkchi Hisor	20	8	5	7	26	26	0	29	
9	Eskhata	22	5	9	8	27	37	−10	24	
10	Parvoz	21	4	5	12	17	37	−20	17	
11	Sardor	21	3	8	10	30	38	−8	17	Qualification to Relegation play-offs
12	Istaravshan (R)	21	0	7	14	16	40	−24	7	Relegation to Tajik First Division

Updated to match(es) played on 14 November 2026. Source: Soccerway
Rules for classification: 1) Points; 2) Head-to-head points; 3) Head-to-head goal difference; 4) Head-to-head goals scored away; 5) Goal difference; 6) Goals scored.
(A) Advance to a further round; (Q) Qualified for the phase indicated; (R) Relegated

=== Results ===
Home \ Away	BAR	CPD	ESK	ISA	IST	KHF	KJD	PAR	RAV	REG	SAR	VAK
Barkchi Hisor		1–0	1–2	2–1		1–1	1–0	2–0	1–1	1–4	2–0	2–2
CSKA Pamir	2–1		1–0	2–1	0–1	2–3	0–0	1–2	0–3	1–2	3–1	1–1
Eskhata	2–2	0–2		3–1	0–0	1–6	0–1	1–1	1–1	1–1	4–3	1–2
Istaravshan	1–4	0–1	0–1		1–2	0–0	0–2	1–1	0–1	1–1	1–1	1–1
Istiklol	2–0	3–1	1–1			1–0	2–1	3–0	0–0	1–0	0–0	1–0
Khosilot Farkhor	2–1	3–0		5–2	1–1		2–0	2–0	1–0	1–0	3–2	0–3
Khujand		1–1	2–0	1–0	1–0	1–0		0–2	4–1	0–0	2–2	0–0
Parvoz	0–0		1–2	2–2	0–4	1–0	0–1		0–1	0–1	2–4	1–1
Ravshan Kulob	2–3	0–1	3–1	4–1	0–1	1–1	1–0	2–3		0–1	3–1	
Regar-TadAZ	2–0	1–1	2–2	3–1	1–0	1–0	0–0	3–0	0–0			3–2
Sardor	0–1	0–2	1–1	2–0	0–1	3–3	2–2	3–0	1–1	0–1		3–3
Vakhsh Bokhtar	2–0	0–1	4–2	1–1	0–2	2–2	0–0	3–1	0–2	0–1	3–1	

Updated to match(es) played on 7 November 2026. Source: Soccerway
Legend: Blue = home team win; Yellow = draw; Red = away team win.

=== Results by round ===
Team ╲ Round	1	2	3	4	5	6	7	8	9	10	11	12	13	14	15	16	17	18	19	20	21	22
Barkchi Hisor	L	W	L	L	W	W	L	L	W	L	W	D	D	D	W	W	W	L		D	D	
CSKA Pamir	L	D	W	W	W	W	W	W	L	L	L	L	D	D	L	W	L	W	W	D	L	
Eskhata	L	L	W	L	L	W	W	D	D	W	L	L	L	D	D	L	W	D	D	D	D	
Istaravshan	D	D	L	D	L	L	L	L	D	L	L	D	L	L	D	L	L	L	L	L	D	
Istiklol	D	W	D	W	D	W	W	W	D	W	W	W	L	W	W	W	L	W		D	W	
Khosilot Farkhor	W	D	W	L	D	L	W	W	D	W	W	W	W	D	W	L	W	D	L	L	D	
Khujand	W	D	W	D	D	L	L	L	W	D	L	W	D	W	D	D	W	W	W	L	D	
Parvoz	D	L	L	L	L	W	W	D	L	L	W	D	L	L	L	W	L	L	L	D	D	
Ravshan Kulob	D	L	D	W	W	L	L	W	L	W	W	L	D	L	D	L	W	D	W	W	D	
Regar-TadAZ	D	L	W	W	D	W	W	D	W	W	W	W	W	W	L	D	W	W	D	D	D	
Sardor	D	W	L	D	L	L	L	L	D	L	L	L	W	D	D	D	L	D	L	W	D	
Vakhsh Bokhtar	W	W	L	D	W	L	L	D	D	D	L	D	W	D	D	D	L	L	W	W	D	

Updated to match(es) played on 7 November 2026. Source:
W = Win; D = Draw; L = Loss; P = Postponed

== Awards ==
=== Monthly awards ===
Month	Manager of the Month		Player of the Month		References
Month	Manager	Club	Player	Club	References
April	(Tajikistan) Faiz Davlatov	CSKA Pamir Dushanbe	(Uzbekistan) Islombek Isokjonov	CSKA Pamir Dushanbe	
