= 2027–28 AFC Champions League Elite =

Tournament details
- Dates: Qualifying: 27 July–10 August 2027; Competition proper: 13 September 2027 – 29 April 2028
- Teams: Competition proper: 32; Total: 36 (from 14 associations)

The 2027–28 AFC Champions League Elite (ACL Elite) will be the 46th edition of Asia's premier club football tournament, organized by the Asian Football Confederation (AFC), and the fourth under the AFC Champions League Elite title.

Saudi Arabia has provisionally been awarded the hosting rights for the finals until 2029. The tournament winner will qualify for the 2028–29 AFC Champions League Elite league stage, the 2028 FIFA Intercontinental Cup and the 2029 FIFA Club World Cup.

== Association team allocation ==
The associations are allocated slots according to their club competitions ranking which was published after the 2025–26 competitions were completed.

Participation for 2027–28 AFC Champions League Elite
Participating
Not participating

West Region (16 teams)
Rank		Member association	Points	Slots	
Rank		Member association	Points	League stage	Preliminary stage
Region	AFC	Member association	Points	League stage	Preliminary stage
1	1	Saudi Arabia	132.545	3	2
2	4	United Arab Emirates	79.470	3	1
3	5	Iran	71.449	3	0
4	6	Qatar	69.347	2	0
5	10	Uzbekistan	47.251	1	1
6	12	Jordan	43.330	1	0
7	13	Iraq	42.163	0	1
Total		Participating associations: 7		14	4
Total		Participating associations: 7		18	

East Region (16 teams)
Rank		Member association	Points	Slots	
Rank		Member association	Points	League stage	Preliminary stage
Region	AFC	Member association	Points	League stage	Preliminary stage
1	2	Japan	120.410	3	2
2	3	South Korea	87.334	3	1
3	7	Thailand	62.846	3	0
4	8	China	49.483	2	0
5	9	Australia	49.178	1	1
6	11	Malaysia	45.184	1	0
7	14	Singapore	38.894	0	1
Total		Participating associations: 7		14	4
Total		Participating associations: 7		18	

== Teams ==
Location of the 2027–28 AFC Champions League Elite group stage teams
Orange: East Region; Blue: West Region

Entry round	West Region			East Region		
League stage	Team	Qualifying method	App. (last)	Team	Qualifying method	App. (last)
League stage	(Saudi Arabia)	2026–27 Saudi Pro League champions		(Japan)	2026–27 J1 League champions	
League stage	(Saudi Arabia)	2026–27 Saudi Pro League runners-up		(Japan)	2026–27 J1 League runners-up	
League stage	(Saudi Arabia)	2026–27 Saudi Pro League third place		(Japan)	2026–27 J1 League third place	
League stage	(United Arab Emirates)	2026–27 UAE Pro League champions		(South Korea) FC Seoul	2026 K League 1 champions	10th (2025–26)
League stage	(United Arab Emirates)	2026–27 UAE President's Cup winners		(South Korea)	2026 K League 1 runners-up	
League stage	(United Arab Emirates)	2026–27 UAE Pro League runners-up		(South Korea)	2026 K League 1 third place	
League stage	(Iran)	2026–27 Persian Gulf Pro League champions		(Thailand)	2026–27 Thai League 1 champions	
League stage	(Iran)	2026–27 Persian Gulf Pro League runners-up		(Thailand)	2026–27 Thai FA Cup winners	
League stage	(Iran)	2026–27 Persian Gulf Pro League third place		(Thailand)	2026–27 Thai League 1 runners-up	
League stage	(Qatar)	2026–27 Qatar Stars League champions		(China) Dalian Yingbo	2026 Chinese Super League champions	1st
League stage	(Qatar)	2026 Amir of Qatar Cup winners		(China)	2026 Chinese FA Cup winners	
League stage	(Uzbekistan)	2026 Uzbekistan Super League champions		(Australia)	2026–27 A-League Men regular season premiers	
League stage	(Jordan)	2026–27 Jordanian Pro League champions		(Malaysia)	2026–27 Malaysia Super League champions	
Preliminary stage	(Saudi Arabia)	2026–27 Saudi Pro League fourth place		(Japan)	2026–27 J1 League fourth place	
Preliminary stage	(Saudi Arabia)	2026–27 Saudi Pro League fifth place		(Japan)	2026–27 J1 League fifth place	
Preliminary stage	(United Arab Emirates)	2026–27 UAE Pro League third place		(South Korea)	2026 K League 1 fourth place	
Preliminary stage	(Uzbekistan)	2026 Uzbekistan Cup winners		(Australia)	2026–27 A-League Men regular season runners-up	
Preliminary stage	(Iraq)	2026–27 Iraq Stars League champions		(Singapore)	2026–27 Singapore Premier League champions	

The following teams will also qualify to the West or East region unless they have already qualified via their domestic performance.

West or East Region
Entry round	Team	Qualifying method	App. (last)
League stage		2026–27 AFC Champions League Elite champions	
Qualifying play-off		2026–27 AFC Champions League Two champions	

Notes

1. South Korea (KOR): Daejeon Hana Citizen and Ulsan HD has qualified to at least the Preliminary stage.

== See also ==
- 2027–28 AFC Champions League Two
- 2027–28 AFC Challenge League
- 2027–28 AFC Women's Champions League
