= Alimzhon Rafikov =

Tajik football coach

Personal information
- Full name: Alimzhon Kyashafovich Rafikov
- Date of birth: 30 April 1962 (age 64)
- Place of birth: Dushanbe, Tajik SSR, USSR
- Height: 1.78 m (5 ft 10 in)
- Position: Defender

Senior career*
Years	Team	Apps	(Gls)
1983	Pakhtakor Kurgan-Tyube		
1984–1985	Pamir Dushanbe	50	(1)
1986–1988	Kairat	42	(0)
1989–1992	Pamir Dushanbe	61	(0)
1992	Zenit St. Petersburg	14	(0)
1993–1995	KAMAZ	59	(0)
1995	Neftekhimik Nizhnekamsk	16	(1)
1999	KAMAZ	13	(0)

Managerial career
- 2010–2012: Istiklol
- 2011–2012: Tajikistan
- 2017: Esteghlal Dushanbe
- * Club domestic league appearances and goals

Alimzhon Kyashafovich Rafikov (Tajik: Алимҷон Рафиқов; Russian: Алимжон Кяшафович Рафиков; born 30 April 1962) is a Tajik professional football coach and a former player.

== Club career ==
He made his professional debut in the Soviet Second League in 1983 for FC Pakhtakor Kurgan-Tyube.

== Coaching career ==
He is currently the manager of Esteghlal Dushanbe.

== Personal life ==
His son Ruslan Rafikov is a professional footballer.

== Honours ==
- USSR Federation Cup winner: 1988.
