= Khusrav Toirov =

Tajikistani footballer (born 2004)

Personal information
- Date of birth: 1 August 2004 (age 22)
- Place of birth: Danghara, Tajikistan
- Height: 1.81 m (5 ft 11 in)
- Position: Left winger

Team information
- Current team: Ravshan Kulob (on loan from Shakhtar Donetsk)
- Number: 7

Youth career
- 2019–2020: Lokomotiv-Pamir

Senior career*
Years	Team	Apps	(Gls)
2020–2021	Lokomotiv-Pamir	2	(0)
2021–2022	Dynamo Dushanbe	0	(0)
2022	Atyrau	10	(0)
2022	→ Atyray U21	1	(1)
2023–	Shakhtar Donetsk	2	(0)
2024	→ Atyrau (loan)	8	(1)
2025	→ Chornomorets Odesa (loan)	5	(0)
2026	→ Istiklol (loan)	3	(0)
2026–	→ Ravshan Kulob (loan)	0	(0)

International career^{‡}
2019–2021	Tajikistan U17	4	(2)
2022–	Tajikistan U20	4	(0)
2023–	Tajikistan	5	(0)
- * Club domestic league appearances and goals as of 15 August 2026 ‡ National team caps and goals as of 09:58, 15 October 2024 (UTC)

Khusrav Mirsaidovich Toirov (Tajik: Хусрав Тоиров; born 1 August 2004) is a Tajikistani professional footballer who plays as a left winger for Ravshan Kulob on loan from Shakhtar Donetsk, and the Tajikistan national team.

== Early life ==
As a youth player, Toirov joined the youth academy of Lokomotiv-Pamir.

== Club career ==
Toirov started playing football in 2020 as part of the club Lokomotiv-Pamir, making his debut on 5 April 2020, replacing Khakimjon Khasanov, at the age of fifteen. In May 2021, Toirov was named the Tajikistan First League Player of the Month. He was also named the best in the UEFA Development Cup in 2021.

In 2021, Toirov moved to Dynamo Dushanbe, but he never played a single match for the club, joining Kazakh club Atyrau later in 2022, where he made eleven appearances and recorded two assists. Toirov made his debut in the Kazakhstan Cup on 13 August 2022.

On 1 March 2023, Shakhtar Donetsk announced the signing of a contract Toirov to a five-year contract. The transfer fee was 300,000 euros. He chose the number 77 because his mother was born in 1977.

On 25 February 2025, Toirov joined Chornomorets Odesa on loan for the remainder of the 2024–25 season.

On 18 February 2026, Shakhtar Donetsk announced that Toirov had joined Istiklol on loan until 30 November 2026. On 29 July 2026 Istiklol announced that Toirov had left the club.

On 30 July 2026, Ravshan Kulob announced that Toirov had joined the club.

== International career ==
Since 2022, he has been playing as part of the Tajikistan national under-17 football team. On 11 June 2023, Toirov made his debut for Tajikistan, coming on as a 64th minute substitute for Shervoni Mabatshoev in their 1-1 draw against Turkmenistan in the 2023 CAFA Nations Cup.

== Style of play ==
Toirov can operate as a winger or striker. He is known for his speed, dribbling and vision.

== Career statistics ==
=== International ===
As of match played 14 October 2024

National team	Year	Apps	Goals
Tajikistan	2023	2	0
Tajikistan	2024	3	0
Total		5	0
