= Alisher Shukurov =

Tajikistani professional football player

Personal information
- Date of birth: 30 March 2002 (age 24)
- Place of birth: Tajikistan
- Height: 1.76 m (5 ft 9 in)
- Position: Midfielder

Team information
- Current team: Istiklol
- Number: 41

Senior career*
| Years | Team | Apps | (Gls) |
| 2021–2024 | Kuktosh Rudaki | 36 | (6) |
| 2024–2025 | Dinamo Tbilisi | 3 | (0) |
| 2024 | → Vakhsh Bokhtar (loan) | 9 | (1) |
| 2025 | Tyumen | 2 | (0) |
| 2025 | Khujand | 8 | (1) |
| 2026 | Qizilqum | 8 | (0) |
| 2026– | Istiklol | 0 | (0) |

International career^{‡}
| 2023– | Tajikistan | 15 | (0) |
- * Club domestic league appearances and goals as of 2 March 2026 ‡ National team caps and goals as of 18 November 2025

Alisher Shukurov (Tajik: Алишер Шукуров, born 30 March 2002) is a Tajik professional footballer who plays as a midfielder for Istiklol and the Tajikistan national team.

== Career ==
=== Club ===
On 11 February 2024, Dinamo Tbilisi announced the signing of Shukurov to a two-year contract, with the option of a third, from Kuktosh Rudaki.

On 10 July 2024, Vakhsh Bokhtar announced the singing of Shukurov on loan for the remainder of the year from Dinamo Tbilisi.

On 14 March 2025, Tyumen announced the signing of Shukurov.

On 12 July 2025, Khujand announced the singing of Shukurov.

On 22 December 2025, Uzbekistan Super League club Qizilqum announced the signing of Shukurov.

On 14 July 2026, Tajikistan Higher League club Istiklol announced the signing of Shukurov.

=== International ===
Shukurov made his senior team debut on 17 October 2023 against Malaysia.

Shukurov was named as part of Tajikistans squad for the 2023 AFC Asian Cup.

== Career statistics ==
=== Club ===
As of match played 8 April 2024

Appearances and goals by club, season and competition
| Club | Season | League | | | National cup (Note: Includes Georgian Cup) | | League cup | | Continental | | Other | | Total | |
| Club | Season | Division | Apps | Goals | Apps | Goals | Apps | Goals | Apps | Goals | Apps | Goals | Apps | Goals |
|---|---|---|---|---|---|---|---|---|---|---|---|---|---|---|
| Dinamo Tbilisi | 2024 | Erovnuli Liga | 3 | 0 | 0 | 0 | — | | 0 (Note: Appearances in UEFA Conference League) | 0 | 0 | 0 | 3 | 0 |
| Career total | | | 3 | 0 | 0 | 0 | 0 | 0 | 0 | 0 | 0 | 0 | 3 | 0 |

=== International ===
As of match played 13 November 2024

| National team | Year | Apps | Goals |
|---|---|---|---|
| Tajikistan | 2023 | 1 | 0 |
| Tajikistan | 2024 | 11 | 0 |
| Total | | 12 | 0 |

== Honours ==
=== International ===
==== Tajikistan ====
- Merdeka Tournament: 2023
