= 2027–28 AFC Champions League Two =

Tournament details
- Dates: TBD
- Teams: 32 (from 24 to 26 associations)
- All statistics correct as of 21 April 2026.

The 2027–28 AFC Champions League Two is the 24th edition of the Asia's second-tier club football tournament, organized by the Asian Football Confederation (AFC), and the fourth under the AFC Champions League Two title.

The tournament will feature 32 teams in the group stage. The winner will qualify for the preliminary stage of the 2028–29 AFC Champions League Elite, if they have not already qualified through their domestic performance.

== Association team allocation ==
The associations are allocated slots according to their club competitions ranking which was published after the 2025–26 competitions were completed.

Participation for 2027–2028 AFC Champions League Two
Participating
Not participating

West Region (4 groups)
Rank		Member association	Points	Slots	
Rank		Member association	Points	Group stage	Preliminary stage
Zone	AFC	Member association	Points	Group stage	Preliminary stage
—	—	2027–28 AFC Champions League Elite preliminary stage loser	—	2 to 4	0
1	1	Saudi Arabia	132.545	1	0
2	4	United Arab Emirates	79.470	1	0
3	5	Iran	71.449	1	0
4	6	Qatar	69.347	1	0
5	9	Uzbekistan	47.251	1	0
6	12	Jordan	43.330	1	0
7	13	Iraq	42.163	1	0
8	16	Bahrain	29.548	1	1
9	17	Oman	29.412	1	1
10	18	Kuwait	28.242	1	1
11	21	Turkmenistan	26,704	0	1
12	23	Tajikistan	22.377	0	1
—	—	2026–27 AFC Challenge League finalist	—	0 or 1	0 or 1
Total		Participating associations: 12 or 13		12 to 15	5 or 6
Total		Participating associations: 12 or 13		17 to 20	

East Region (4 groups)
Rank		Member association	Points	Slots	
Rank		Member association	Points	Group stage	Preliminary stage
Zone	AFC	Member association	Points	Group stage	Preliminary stage
—	—	2027–28 AFC Champions League Elite preliminary stage loser	—	2 to 4	0
1	2	Japan	120.410	1	0
2	3	South Korea	87.334	1	0
3	7	Thailand	62.846	1	0
4	8	China	49.483	1	0
5	10	Australia	49.178	1	0
6	11	Malaysia	45.184	1	0
7	14	Singapore	38.894	1	0
8	15	Vietnam	38.020	1	1
9	19	Cambodia	27.850	1	1
10	20	Indonesia	27.299	1	1
11	22	Hong Kong	23.933	0	1
12	27	Philippines	18.590	0	1
—	—	2026–27 AFC Challenge League finalist	—	0 or 1	0 or 1
Total		Participating associations: 12 or 13		12 to 15	5 or 6
Total		Participating associations: 12 or 13		17 to 20	

== Teams ==
Location of the 2027–28 AFC Champions League Two group stage teams
Orange: East Region; Blue: West Region

Qualified teams for the 2027–28 AFC Champions League Two
Entry round	West Region			East Region		
Group stage	Team	Qualifying method	App. (last)	Team	Qualifying method	App. (last)
Group stage		2027–28 AFC Champions League Elite preliminary stage losers			2027–28 AFC Champions League Elite preliminary stage losers	
Group stage	(Saudi Arabia)	2026–27 Saudi Pro League sixth place		(Japan)	2026–27 Emperor's Cup winners	
Group stage	(United Arab Emirates)	2026–27 UAE Pro League fourth place		(South Korea)	2026–27 Korea Cup winners	
Group stage	(Qatar)	2026–27 Qatar Stars League third place		(Thailand)	2026–27 Thai League 1 third place	
Group stage	(Iran)	2026–27 Persian Gulf Pro League fourth place		(China) Chengdu Rongcheng	2026 Chinese Super League runners-up	1st
Group stage	(Uzbekistan)	2026 Uzbekistan Super League third place		(Australia) South Melbourne	2026 Australia Cup winners	1st
Group stage	(Iraq)	2025–27 Iraq Stars League runners-up		(Malaysia)	2026–27 Malaysia Super League runners-up	
Group stage	(Jordan)	2026–27 Jordan FA Cup winners		(Singapore)	2026–27 Singapore Premier League runners-up	
Group stage	(Bahrain)	2026–27 Bahraini Premier League champions		(Vietnam)	2026–27 V.League 1 champions	
Group stage	(Oman)	2026–27 Oman Professional League champions		(Cambodia)	2026–27 Cambodian Premier League champions	
Group stage	(Kuwait)	2026–27 Kuwaiti Premier League champions		(Indonesia)	2026–27 Indonesia Super League champions	
Preliminary stage	(Bahrain)	2026–27 Bahraini Premier League runners-up		(Vietnam)	2026–27 Vietnamese Cup champions	
Preliminary stage	(Oman)	2026–27 Sultan Qaboos Cup winners		(Cambodia)	2026–27 Cambodian Premier League runners-up	
Preliminary stage	(Kuwait)	2026–27 Kuwaiti Premier League runners-up		(Indonesia)	2026–27 Indonesia Super League runners-up	
Preliminary stage	(Turkmenistan) Arkadag	2026 Ýokary Liga champions	3rd (2026–27)	(Hong Kong)	2026–27 Hong Kong Premier League champions	
Preliminary stage	(Tajikistan)	2026 Tajikistan Higher League champions		(Philippines)	2026–27 Philippines Football League champions	

The following teams will also qualify to the West or East region unless they have already qualified via their domestic performance.

West or East Region
Entry round	Team	Qualifying method	App. (last)
League stage		2026–27 AFC Challenge League champions	
Qualifying play-off		2026–27 AFC Challenge League runners-up	

== See also ==
- 2027–28 AFC Champions League Elite
- 2027–28 AFC Challenge League
- 2027–28 AFC Women's Champions League
