= Alidzhon Karomatullozoda =

Tajikistani professional football player

Personal information
- Full name: Alidzhon Karomatulloyevich Karomatullozoda
- Date of birth: 5 May 2002 (age 24)
- Place of birth: Kulob, Tajikistan
- Height: 1.78 m (5 ft 10 in)
- Position: Defender

Team information
- Current team: Istiklol
- Number: 23

Youth career
- CSKA Pamir Dushanbe

Senior career*
Years	Team	Apps	(Gls)
2020–2021	CSKA Pamir Dushanbe		
2022–2024	Istiklol	34	(2)
2024	Khosilot Farkhor	9	(0)
2025	Ravshan Kulob	17	(0)
2026–	Istiklol	1	(0)

International career^{‡}
2021–	Tajikistan	7	(0)
- * Club domestic league appearances and goals as of 9 March 2026 ‡ National team caps and goals as of 18 November 2025

Alidzhon Karomatulloyevich Karomatullozoda (Tajik: Аличон Кароматуллоевич Кароматуллозода, Russian: ‌Алиджон Кароматуллоевич Кароматуллозода), born 5 May 2002) is a Tajik professional footballer who plays as a defender for Istiklol and the Tajikistan national team.

== Career ==
=== Club ===
On 31 March 2022, Istiklol confirmed the signing of Karomatullozoda. On 2 July 2024, Istiklol announced the departure of Karomatullozoda after his contract was terminated by mutual consent.

On 14 January 2026, Istiklol announced the return of Karomatullozoda to the club.

=== International ===
Alidzhon made his senior team debut on 15 June 2021 against Myanmar, coming on as a half-time substitute for Manuchehr Safarov.

== Career statistics ==
=== Club ===
As of match played 7 March 2026

Club	Season	League			National Cup		Continental		Other		Total	
Club	Season	Division	Apps	Goals	Apps	Goals	Apps	Goals	Apps	Goals	Apps	Goals
Istiklol	2022	Tajikistan Higher League	18	2	4	0	2 (Note: Appearances in the AFC Champions League)	0	1 (Note: Appearances in the Tajik Supercup)	0	25	2
Istiklol	2023	Tajikistan Higher League	13	0	1	0	2	0	0	0	16	0
Istiklol	2024	Tajikistan Higher League	3	0	0	0	0 (Note: Appearances in the AFC Champions League Two)	0	0	0	3	0
Istiklol	Total		34	2	5	0	4	0	1	0	44	2
Khosilot Farkhor	2024	Tajikistan Higher League	9	0	0	0	-		-		9	0
Ravshan Kulob	2025	Tajikistan Higher League	19	0	0	0	-		-		19	0
Istiklol	2026	Tajikistan Higher League	1	0	0	0	0	0	0	0	1	0
Career total			63	2	5	0	4	0	1	0	73	2

=== International ===
Tajikistan national team
Year	Apps	Goals
2021	1	0
2022	3	0
Total	4	0

Statistics accurate as of match played 17 November 2022

== Honors ==
Istiklol

- Tajikistan Higher League (2):2022, 2023
- Tajikistan Cup (2): 2022, 2023
- Tajik Supercup (2): 2022, 2024

Tajikistan

- King's Cup: 2022
