= Oleksiy Shchebetun =

Ukrainian footballer

Oleksiy Schebetun
Personal information
- Full name: Oleksiy Volodymyrovych Schebetun
- Date of birth: 2 June 1997 (age 29)
- Place of birth: Zaporizhya, Ukraine
- Height: 1.84 m (6 ft 1/2 in)
- Position: Forward

Team information
- Current team: Istiklol
- Number: 8

Youth career
- 2010–2012: Metalurh Zaporizhya
- 2013–2014: Dynamo Kyiv

Senior career*
Years	Team	Apps	(Gls)
2014–2017	Dynamo Kyiv	0	(0)
2017	→ Stal Kamianske (loan)	5	(0)
2018	Luch Minsk	8	(0)
2018	Metalurh Zaporizhia	9	(1)
2019	Avanhard Kramatorsk	4	(0)
2019–2020	Metalurh Zaporizhia	20	(3)
2020–2022	Obolon Kyiv	46	(6)
2020	→ Obolon-2 Kyiv	4	(0)
2022–2023	Šiauliai	55	(20)
2024	Kyzylzhar	20	(3)
2025	Zimbru Chișinău	24	(7)
2026	Qizilqum	4	(0)
2026–	Istiklol	9	(0)

International career^{‡}
2014	Ukraine U17	9	(5)
2014–2015	Ukraine U18	10	(7)
2015–2016	Ukraine U19	13	(3)
2016	Ukraine U20	2	(0)
2016	Ukraine U21	3	(0)
- * Club domestic league appearances and goals as of 16 November 2026 ‡ National team caps and goals as of 16 July 2017

Oleksiy Volodymyrovych Shchebetun (Ukrainian: Олексій Володимирович Щебетун; born 2 June 1997) is a professional Ukrainian football forward who plays for Istiklol.

== Career ==
Born in Zaporizhya, Schebetun is a product of the Metalurh Zaporizhya and Dynamo Kyiv sportive schools. His first trainer was Mykola Senovalov.

He played for FC Dynamo in the Ukrainian Premier League Reserves and in July 2017 he went on half year loan to FC Stal Kamianske in the Ukrainian Premier League. He made his debut in the Ukrainian Premier League for Stal Kamianske on 16 July 2017, playing in a match against FC Zorya Luhansk.

On 7 March 2018 he signed contract with Belarusian Premier League club Luch Minsk.

On 30 July 2026, Tajikistan Higher League club Istiklol announced the signing of Shchebetun.
