= Luka Zgursky =

Russian footballer

Personal information
- Full name: Luka Vadimovich Zgursky
- Date of birth: 5 December 2005 (age 20)
- Place of birth: Sevastopol, Ukraine
- Height: 1.87 m (6 ft 2 in)
- Position: Forward

Team information
- Current team: Belshina Bobruisk
- Number: 27

Youth career
- –2015: SDYuShOR-5 Sevastopol
- 2016–2023: CSKA Moscow

Senior career*
Years	Team	Apps	(Gls)
2024–2025	Andijon	14	(1)
2025	→ Turan (loan)	12	(2)
2025	Atyrau	8	(1)
2026	Istiklol	6	(1)
2026–	Belshina Bobruisk	4	(0)

International career^{‡}
2023	Russia U-21	2	(0)
- * Club domestic league appearances and goals as of 6 September 2026 ‡ National team caps and goals as of 11 September 2023

Luka Vadimovich Zgursky (Russian: Лука Вадимович Згурский, Ukrainian: Лука Вадимович Згурський; born 5 December 2005) is a Ukrainian-born Russian footballer who plays as a forward for Belarusian club Belshina Bobruisk.

== Club career ==
He made his Uzbekistan Super League debut for Andijon on 3 March 2024 in a game against AGMK.

He made his Kazakhstan Premier League debut for Turan on 2 March 2025 in a game against Okzhetpes.

On 14 February 2026, Tajikistan Higher League club Istiklol announced the signing of Zgursky from Atyrau, on a contract until the end of the season. On 29 July 2026 Istiklol announced that Zgursky had left the club.

== Career statistics ==
=== Club ===
As of match played 28 June 2026

Club	Season	League			National Cup		Continental		Other		Total	
Club	Season	Division	Apps	Goals	Apps	Goals	Apps	Goals	Apps	Goals	Apps	Goals
Andijon	2024	Uzbekistan Super League	14	1	3	0	-		-		17	1
Andijon	2025	Uzbekistan Super League	0	0	0	0	-		-		0	0
Andijon	Total		14	1	3	0	0	0	0	0	17	1
Turan (loan)	2025	Kazakhstan Premier League	12	2	2	0	-		-		14	2
Atyrau	2025	Kazakhstan Premier League	8	1	0	0	-		-		8	1
Istiklol	2026	Tajikistan Higher League	6	1	2	0	0 (Note: Appearances in the AFC Challenge League)	0	0 (Note: Appearances and goals in the Tajik Supercup)	0	8	1
Career total			40	5	7	0	0	0	0	0	47	5

== Honours ==
=== Club ===
Andijon

- Uzbek Cup winner: 2024
