= Daler Sharipov (footballer) =

Tajik footballer (born 2004)

Personal information
- Full name: Daler Amirovich Sharipov
- Date of birth: 13 February 2004 (age 22)
- Position: Forward

Team information
- Current team: Istiklol
- Number: 20

Youth career
- Metallurg Bekabad

Senior career*
Years	Team	Apps	(Gls)
2022–2024	Metallurg Bekabad	34	(4)
2025	Shurtan	11	(0)
2025	Khujand	8	(1)
2026–	Istiklol	10	(2)

International career^{‡}
2023	Tajikistan U20	6	(0)
2023–	Tajikistan U23	9	(1)
2024–	Tajikistan	6	(0)
- * Club domestic league appearances and goals as of 15:41, 15 June 2026 (UTC) ‡ National team caps and goals as of 10:35, 1 April 2026 (UTC)

Daler Amirovich Sharipov (born 13 February 2004) is a Tajik former professional footballer who played as a forward.

== Club career ==
On 18 July 2025, Tajikistan Higher League club Khujand announced the signing of Sharipov.

On 4 February 2026, fellow Tajikistan Higher League club Istiklol announced the signing of Sharipov from Khujand to a one-year contract.

== Career statistics ==
=== Club ===
As of match played 14 June 2026

Appearances and goals by club, season and competition
Club	Season	League			National cup		Continental		Other		Total	
Club	Season	Division	Apps	Goals	Apps	Goals	Apps	Goals	Apps	Goals	Apps	Goals
Metallurg Bekabad	2022	Uzbekistan Super League	1	0	0	0	–		–		1	0
Metallurg Bekabad	2023	Uzbekistan Super League	9	1	1	0	–		–		10	1
Metallurg Bekabad	2024	Uzbekistan Super League	24	3	2	0	–		2	0	28	3
Metallurg Bekabad	Total		34	4	3	0	-	-	2	0	39	4
Shurtan	2025	Uzbekistan Super League	11	0	4	0	–		–		15	0
Khujand	2025	Tajikistan Higher League	8	1	0	0	–		–		8	1
Istiklol	2026	Tajikistan Higher League	10	2	1	0	–		0	0	11	2
Career total			63	7	8	0	0	0	2	0	73	7

=== International ===
As of match played 31 March 2026

Appearances and goals by national team and year
National team	Year	Apps	Goals
Tajikistan
Tajikistan	2024	5	0
Tajikistan	2025	0	0
Tajikistan	2026	1	0
Total		6	0
