= 2027–28 AFC Challenge League =

International football competition in Asia

Tournament details
- Dates: Qualifying: 11 August – 8 September 2026; Competition proper: 17 October 2026 – 8 May 2027
- Teams: Competition proper: 20; Total: TBD (from 18 to 24 associations)

The 2027–28 AFC Challenge League is the 14th edition of the Asia's third-tier continental club football competition, organized by the Asian Football Confederation (AFC), and the third under the AFC Challenge League title.

The winners will automatically qualify for the 2028–29 AFC Champions League Two group stage, while the runners-up will qualify for the preliminary stage.

== Association team allocation ==
The associations are allocated slots according to their club competitions ranking which was published after the 2025–26 competitions were completed.

Participation for 2027–2028 AFC Champions League Two
Participating
Not participating

West Region (3 groups)
Rank		Member association	Points	Slots	
Rank		Member association	Points	Group stage	Preliminary stage
Zone	AFC	Member association	Points	Group stage	Preliminary stage
—	—	2027–28 AFC Champions League Two preliminary stage loser	—	1 to 4	0
11	21	Turkmenistan	26,704	1	0
12	23	Tajikistan	22.377	1	0
13	24	Kyrgyzstan	22.355	1	0
14	25	Lebanon	21.687	0	1
15	26	India	20.765	0	1
16	28	Bangladesh	16.313	0	1
17	31	Syria	11.610	0	1
18	34	Maldives	8.513	0	1
19	35	Bhutan	6.149	0	1
20	36	Palestine	4.862	0	1
21	39	Nepal	1.134	0	1
22	40	Afghanistan	0.995	0	1
23	42	Sri Lanka	0.405	0	1
24	43	Yemen	0.333	0	1
24	43	Pakistan	0.248	0	1
Total		Participating associations: 10		4 to 7	12
Total		Participating associations: 10		16 to 19	

East Region (2 groups)
Rank		Member association	Points	Slots	
Rank		Member association	Points	Group stage	Preliminary stage
Zone	AFC	Member association	Points	Group stage	Preliminary stage
—	—	2027–28 AFC Champions League Two preliminary stage loser	—	1 to 4	0
11	22	Hong Kong	23.933	1	0
12	27	Philippines	18.590	1	0
13	29	Chinese Taipei	14.528	0	1
14	30	Myanmar	12.612	0	1
15	32	Mongolia	9.804	0	1
16	33	North Korea	9.537	0	1
17	37	Laos	3.387	0	1
18	38	Macau	2.696	0	1
19	41	Brunei	0.580	0	1
20	43	Timor-Leste	0.433	0	1
20	43	Guam	0.399	0	1
20	43	Northern Mariana Islands	0.222	0	1
Total		Participating associations: 8		3 to 6	10
Total		Participating associations: 8		13 to 16	

Location of the 2027–28 AFC Challenge League group stage teams
Orange: East Region; Blue: West Region
Locations of the 2027-28 AFC Challenge League teams in the Central Asia
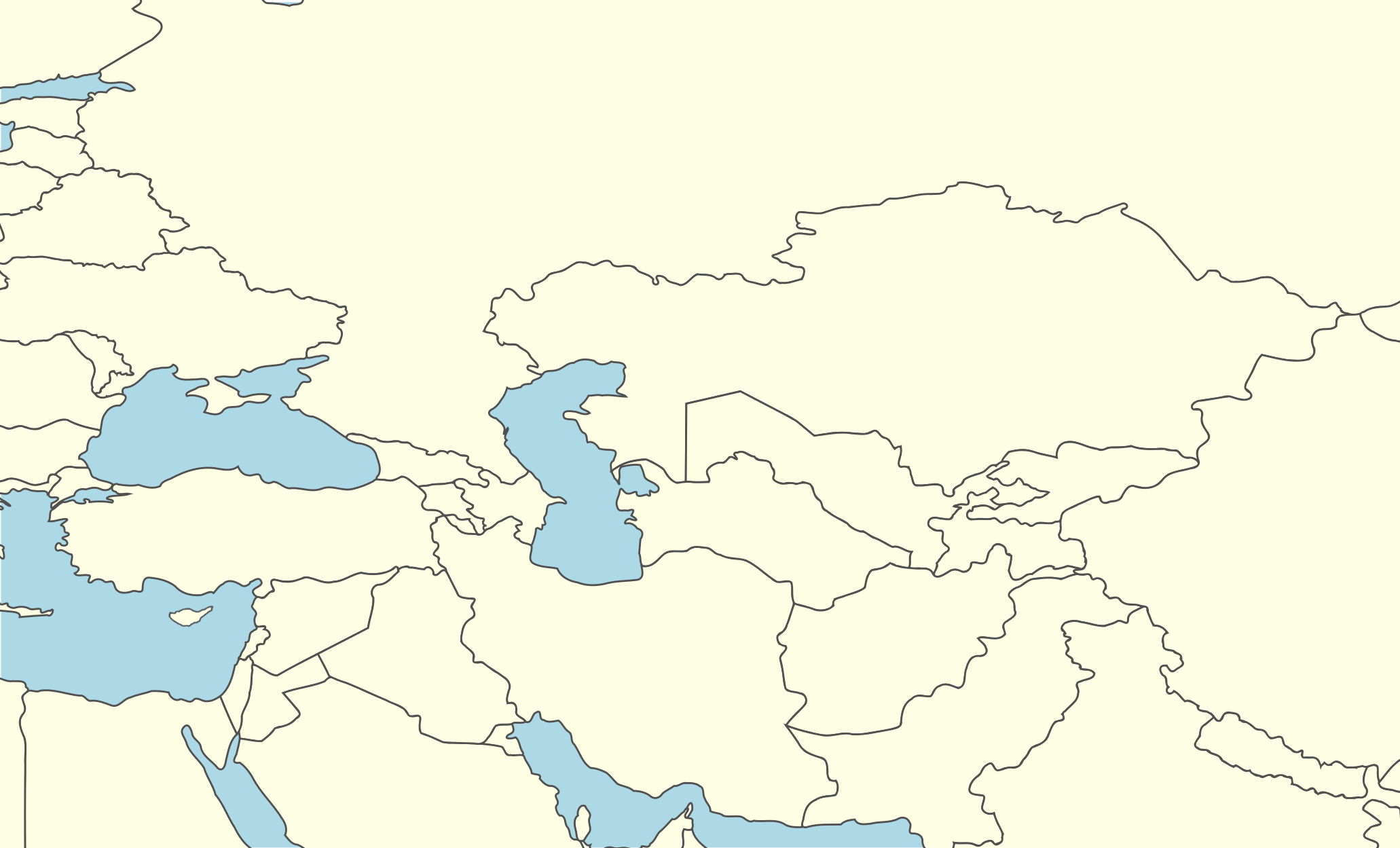
Location of the 2027–28 AFC Challenge League group stage teams
Blue: West Region

== See also ==
- 2027–28 AFC Champions League Elite
- 2027–28 AFC Champions League Two
- 2027–28 AFC Women's Champions League
