= Josip Tomašević (footballer, born 1994) =

Croatian footballer

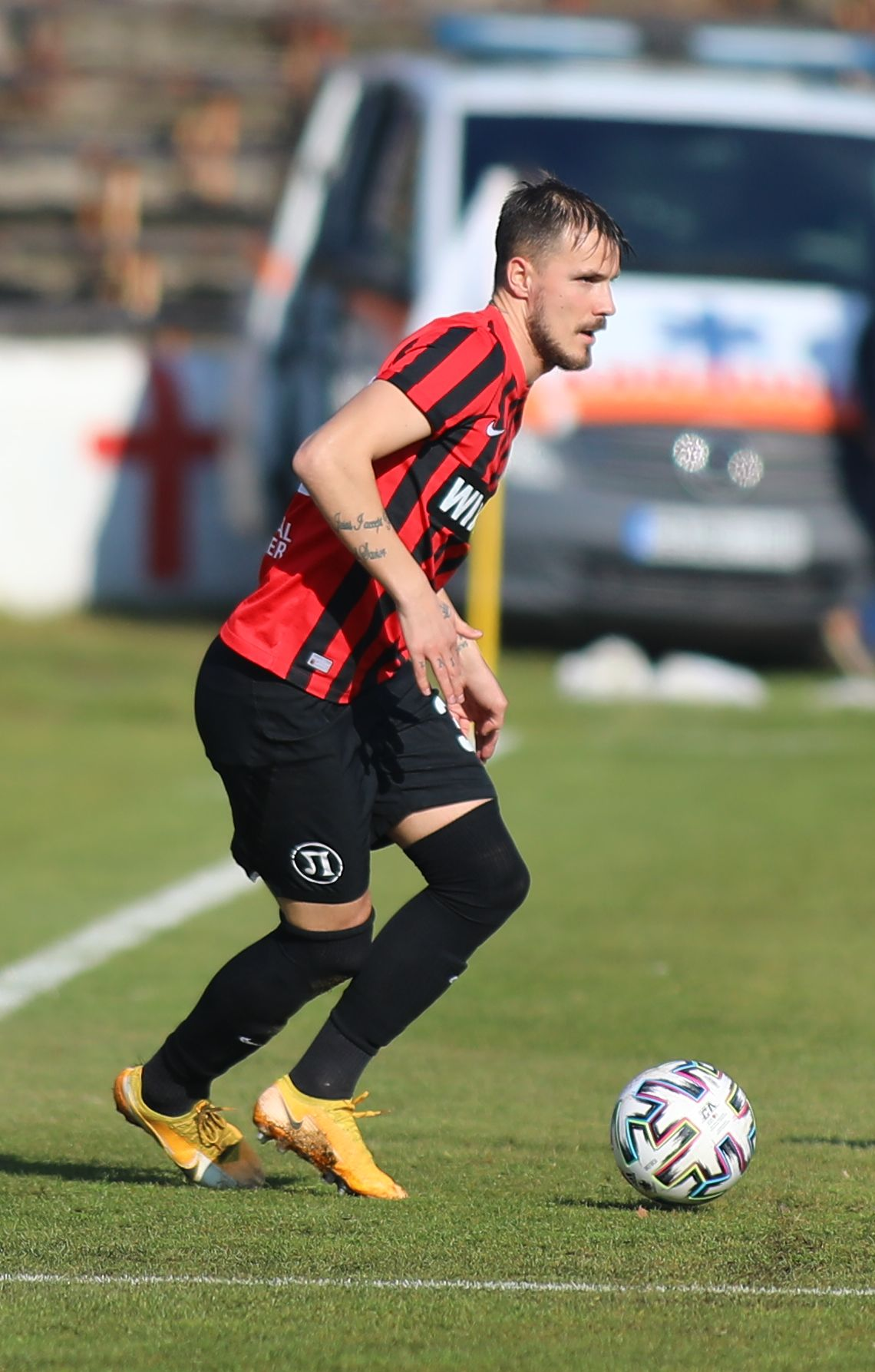
- Tomašević playing for Lokomotiv Plovdiv in 2021

Personal information
- Date of birth: 4 March 1994 (age 32)
- Place of birth: Sinj, Croatia
- Height: 1.79 m (5 ft 10 in)
- Position: Left-back

Team information
- Current team: Istiklol
- Number: 50

Youth career
- 2005: Junak Sinj
- 2006–2013: Hajduk Split

Senior career*
Years	Team	Apps	(Gls)
2013–2015	RNK Split	2	(0)
2014–2015	→ Imotski (loan)	43	(5)
2015–2017	Dugopolje	72	(6)
2018	Cibalia	12	(0)
2018–2020	Lokomotiv Plovdiv	57	(2)
2020–2021	Atromitos	19	(0)
2021–2023	Lokomotiv Plovdiv	54	(1)
2023–2024	Anagennisi Karditsa	14	(0)
2024	Hapoel Hadera	11	(0)
2024	Oțelul Galați	9	(0)
2025	Bukhara	26	(0)
2026–	Istiklol	9	(0)

International career
2008	Croatia U14	2	(0)
2009	Croatia U15	2	(0)
2009–2010	Croatia U16	10	(0)
2010–2011	Croatia U17	14	(0)
2012	Croatia U18	4	(0)
2012	Croatia U19	2	(0)
- * Club domestic league appearances and goals as of 15 June 2026

Josip Tomašević (born 4 March 1994) is a Croatian professional footballer who plays as a left-back for Tajikistan Higher League club Istiklol.

== Career ==
On 14 January 2025, he signed a contract with the Uzbekistan Super League club Bukhara.

On 8 February 2026, Tajikistan Higher League club Istiklol announced the signing of Tomašević, alongside fellow Croatians Frane Čirjak and Frane Ikić, on a contract until the end of the 2026 season.

== Honours ==
Lokomotiv Plovdiv

- Bulgarian Cup: 2018–19, 2019–20
- Bulgarian Supercup: 2020
