= Frane Ikić =

Croatian footballer (born 1994)

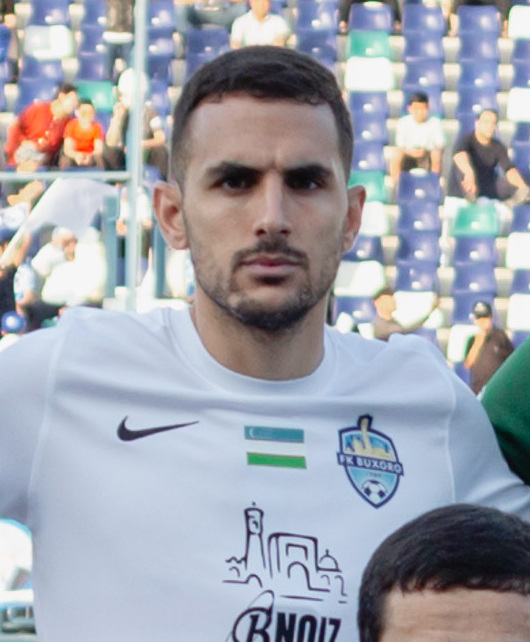

Personal information
- Date of birth: 19 June 1994 (age 32)
- Place of birth: Zadar, Croatia
- Height: 1.94 m (6 ft 4 1/2 in)
- Position: Centre-back

Team information
- Current team: Istiklol
- Number: 26

Youth career
- 2003−2012: Zadar

Senior career*
Years	Team	Apps	(Gls)
2012−2015	Zadar	44	(2)
2015−2017	Rijeka	0	(0)
2015−2016	→ Rijeka II		
2017	Koper	1	(0)
2017−2019	Cibalia	19	(1)
2019	Zadar	7	(0)
2019−2020	Fužinar	16	(3)
2020–2021	Željezničar	27	(2)
2021–2022	Gyirmót	16	(2)
2022–2023	Velež Mostar	16	(1)
2023–2025	Bukhara	63	(6)
2026–	Istiklol	12	(3)

International career
2013	Croatia U19	2	(0)
2015	Croatia U20	1	(0)
2015	Croatia U21	4	(0)
- * Club domestic league appearances and goals as of 18 August 2026

Frane Ikić (born 19 June 1994) is a Croatian professional footballer who plays as a centre-back for Tajikistan Higher League club Istiklol.

== Club career ==
Ikić made his professional debut for Zadar on 17 November 2012, coming on as a substitute. In his first three seasons with Zadar in the 1. HNL he scored 2 goals in 44 appearances. On 15 July 2015, he signed a two-year contract with Rijeka, with the possibility of an additional two-year extension.

On 19 January 2017, Ikić joined Slovenian PrvaLiga club Koper. After appearing in just one match for Koper, Ikić left the club and joined Cibalia. After Cibalia, he returned to and had a brief spell at Zadar. In summer 2019, he returned to Slovenia and joined Fužinar.

On 1 February 2020, Ikić signed a six-month contract with a possibility of an extension with Bosnian Premier League club Željezničar. He made his official debut for Željezničar in a 3–0 win against Zvijezda 09 on 29 February 2020. On 6 June 2020, Ikić extended his contract with Željezničar, which is due to last until June 2021. Ikić scored his first goal for Željezničar on 28 October 2020, in a league match against Zrinjski Mostar. He left Željezničar in June 2021.

On 8 February 2026, Tajikistan Higher League club Istiklol announced the signing of Ikić, alongside fellow Croatians Josip Tomašević and Frane Čirjak, on a contract until the end of the 2026 season.

== International career ==
Ikić represented Croatia at various youth levels between 2013 and 2015.

== Honours ==
Rijeka

- 1. HNL runner-up: 2015–16

Željezničar

- Bosnian Premier League runner-up: 2019–20
