= Denis Kavlinov =

Russian footballer

Personal information
- Full name: Denis Yuryevich Kavlinov
- Date of birth: 10 January 1995 (age 31)
- Place of birth: Elista, Russia
- Height: 1.82 m (6 ft 0 in)
- Position: Goalkeeper

Team information
- Current team: Istiklol
- Number: 78

Youth career
- 2010–2016: Krasnodar

Senior career*
Years	Team	Apps	(Gls)
2013–2017	Krasnodar-2	68	(0)
2014–2015	Krasnodar	0	(0)
2016–2017	→ Dynamo Saint Petersburg (loan)	7	(0)
2017	Kuban Krasnodar	0	(0)
2017–2018	Rotor Volgograd	0	(0)
2018	Khimki	8	(0)
2019	Gomel	21	(0)
2020	Caspiy	1	(0)
2021	Zhetysu	7	(0)
2022	Taraz	5	(0)
2023–2024	Yelimay	25	(0)
2025	Zhetysu	20	(0)
2026–	Istiklol	15	(0)
- * Club domestic league appearances and goals as of 6 October 2026

Denis Yuryevich Kavlinov (Russian: Денис Юрьевич Кавлинов; born 10 January 1995) is a Russian football player who plays for Istiklol.

== Club career ==
He made his debut in the Russian Professional Football League for FC Krasnodar-2 on 4 August 2013 in a game against FC Druzhba Maykop.

He made his Russian Football National League debut for FC Khimki on 17 July 2018 in a game against FC Luch Vladivostok.

On 25 February 2026, Tajikistan Higher League club Istiklol announced the signing of Kavlinov, on a contract until 30 November 2026.
