= Frane Čirjak =

Croatian footballer

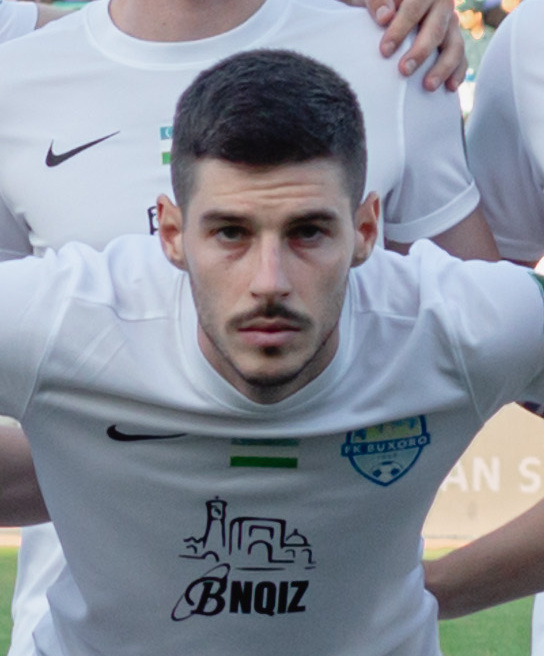

Personal information
- Date of birth: 23 June 1995 (age 31)
- Place of birth: Zadar, Croatia
- Height: 1.80 m (5 ft 11 in)
- Position: Midfielder

Team information
- Current team: HNK Orijent
- Number: 22

Youth career
- Zadar

Senior career*
| Years | Team | Apps | (Gls) |
| 2013–2015 | Zadar | 19 | (0) |
| 2015–2016 | Luzern | 1 | (0) |
| 2017 | Zagreb | 14 | (0) |
| 2017 | → Zagreb II | 2 | (1) |
| 2017–2020 | Zrinjski Mostar | 62 | (2) |
| 2020–2022 | Lviv | 35 | (1) |
| 2022 | → Lokomotiv Sofia (loan) | 6 | (1) |
| 2022–2023 | Sarajevo | 21 | (0) |
| 2023 | Novi Pazar | 15 | (0) |
| 2024 | Bunyodkor | 21 | (0) |
| 2025 | Buxoro | 26 | (1) |
| 2026 | Istiklol | 7 | (0) |
| 2026– | HNK Orijent | 2 | (0) |

International career
| 2013 | Croatia U19 | 5 | (0) |
- * Club domestic league appearances and goals as of 20 October 2026

Frane Čirjak (born 23 June 1995) is a Croatian professional footballer who plays as a midfielder, for Prva NL club HNK Orijent.

== Career ==
In January 2024, Čirjak signed a contract with the Bunyodkor club of Tashkent.

On 8 February 2026, Tajikistan Higher League club Istiklol announced the signing of Čirjak, alongside fellow Croatians Josip Tomašević and Frane Ikić, on a contract until the end of the 2026 season. On 29 July 2026 Istiklol announced that Čirjak had left the club.

== Honours ==
Zrinjski Mostar

- Bosnian Premier League: 2017–18
