= Dmytro Bilonoh =

Ukrainian football player

Personal information
- Full name: Dmytro Ivanovych Bilonoh
- Date of birth: 26 May 1995 (age 31)
- Place of birth: Cherkasy, Ukraine
- Height: 1.83 m (6 ft 0 in)
- Position: Midfielder

Youth career
- 2008–2012: Shakhtar Donetsk

Senior career*
Years	Team	Apps	(Gls)
2012–2015	Shakhtar Donetsk	0	(0)
2013–2015	→ Shakhtar-3 Donetsk	34	(10)
2015–2017	Ural Yekaterinburg	2	(0)
2016–2017	→ Zirka Kropyvnytskyi (loan)	16	(3)
2018	Zirka Kropyvnytskyi	12	(3)
2018	→ Olimpik Donetsk (loan)	5	(1)
2019–2020	Dinamo Minsk	30	(7)
2020	Mariehamn	10	(1)
2021	Yenisey Krasnoyarsk	11	(1)
2021–2022	Metalist Kharkiv	0	(0)
2021–2022	→ Mynai (loan)	15	(1)
2022	Riteriai	28	(8)
2023	Chrobry Głogów	4	(0)
2023	→ Chrobry Głogów II	3	(0)
2023	Nejmeh	10	(3)
2024	Sur	7	(0)
2025	Vakhsh Bokhtar	19	(8)
2026	Istiklol	9	(0)

International career
2010–2011	Ukraine U16	15	(5)
2010–2012	Ukraine U17	22	(9)
2013	Ukraine U18	1	(0)
2013–2014	Ukraine U19	9	(1)
2014	Ukraine U20	2	(0)
- * Club domestic league appearances and goals as of 29 July 2026

Dmytro Ivanovych Bilonoh (Ukrainian: Дмитро Іванович Білоног; born 26 May 1995) is a Ukrainian professional footballer who plays as a midfielder for Istiklol.

== Career ==
He made his debut in the Russian Premier League for Ural Sverdlovsk Oblast on 21 September 2015 in a game against Krasnodar.

In July 2023, Bilonoh joined Lebanese Premier League club Nejmeh.

On 20 January 2026, Tajikistan Higher League club Istiklol announced the signing of Bilonoh to a one-year contract. On 29 July 2026 Istiklol announced that Bilonoh had left the club.

== Honours ==
Nejmeh

- Lebanese Premier League: 2023–24
- Lebanese Super Cup: 2023
