= Ivan Zotko =

Ukrainian footballer

Personal information
- Full name: Ivan Vyacheslavovych Zotko
- Date of birth: 9 July 1996 (age 30)
- Place of birth: Chudniv, Ukraine
- Height: 1.79 m (5 ft 10 in)
- Position: Defender

Youth career
- 2005–2009: Youth Sportive School Chudniv
- 2009–2012: Metalist Kharkiv

Senior career*
Years	Team	Apps	(Gls)
2012–2016	Metalist Kharkiv	8	(1)
2016–2018	Valencia B	30	(2)
2018–2019	Elche	9	(0)
2019	→ Lleida Esportiu (loan)	8	(0)
2019–2021	Olimpik Donetsk	32	(1)
2021–2023	Kryvbas Kryvyi Rih	18	(1)
2023	Urartu	18	(1)
2024	Sūduva	29	(2)
2025	Uzgen	20	(0)
2026	Istiklol	8	(0)

International career^{‡}
2014	Ukraine U18	9	(2)
2014–2015	Ukraine U19	8	(1)
2016	Ukraine U20	3	(1)
2017–2018	Ukraine U21	8	(3)
- * Club domestic league appearances and goals as of 16 March 2026 ‡ National team caps and goals as of 26 June 2021

Ivan Vyacheslavovych Zotko (Ukrainian: Іван В'ячеславович Зотько; born 9 July 1996) is a Ukrainian professional footballer who plays as a defender, most recently for Tajikistan Higher League club Istiklol.

== Career ==
Born in Chudniv, Zhytomyr Oblast, Zotko is a product of the Chudniv and FC Metalist School Systems.

He made his debut for FC Metalist in the match against FC Chornomorets Odesa on 6 December 2015 in the Ukrainian Premier League.

On 4 February 2023, Armenian Premier League club Urartu announced the signing of Zotko. On 29 December 2023, Urartu announced that Zotko had left the club after his contract was terminated by mutual agreement.

On 21 January 2025, Kyrgyz Premier League newcomers Ozgon announced the signing of Zotko. Zotko scored in an Own goal in his debut for Ozgon, in a 3-1 defeat to fellow newcomers Bishkek City on 6 March 2025.

On 12 February 2026, Tajikistan Higher League club Istiklol announced the signing of Zotko, on a contract until the end of the season. On 29 July 2026 Istiklol announced that Zotko had left the club.
