= Vitaly Levchenko =

Tajik-born Ukrainian footballer

Personal information
- Full name: Vitaly Grigoryevich Levchenko
- Date of birth: 28 March 1972 (age 54)
- Place of birth: Leninabad, Tajik SSR
- Height: 1.82 m (6 ft 0 in)
- Positions: Defender; midfielder; forward

Senior career*
Years	Team	Apps	(Gls)
1989	FC Khodzhent Leninabad	22	(2)
1990–1994	FC Dynamo Kyiv	0	(0)
1992–1994	FC Dynamo-2 Kyiv	72	(3)
1994–2000	FC CSKA Kyiv	76	(2)
1994–2000	FC CSKA-2 Kyiv	64	(11)
2001	SC Tavriya Simferopol	8	(0)
2001–2002	FC Volgar-Gazprom Astrakhan	31	(4)
2003	FC Dynamo Stavropol	19	(4)
2003	Changchun Yatai F.C.	12	(0)
2004	FC Spartak Kostroma	15	(2)
2004	FC Ural Sverdlovsk Oblast	16	(1)
2005	FC Metalist-UHMK Kyiv	1	(0)

International career
1996–2000	Tajikistan	9	(0)

Managerial career
- 2005–2008: Knyazha Shchaslyve (assistant)
- 2008–2009: Knyazha Shchaslyve
- 2009–2010: Arsenal Kyiv (football school)
- 2010: Desna Chernihiv (Coach)
- 2012: Yednist Plysky
- 2015: Ukraine U21 (Coach)
- 2016: Tajikistan (Assistant)
- 2016–2017: Tajikistan U20
- 2017: Barkchi Hisor
- 2017–2019: Krylia Sovetov (Coach)
- 2019: Khujand
- 2020–2022: Istiklol
- 2022–2025: Neftchi Fergana
- 2026–: Istiklol
- * Club domestic league appearances and goals

Vitaly Grigoryevich Levchenko (Russian: Виталий Григорьевич Левченко; born 28 March 1972, in Tajik SSR) is a Tajik retired professional footballer and current manager of Istiklol.

Previously, Levchenko was manager of Ukrainian club Arsenal Kyiv's Football School.

== Managerial ==
In June 2016, Levchenko became manager of the Tajikistan U20 team, and assistant manager to Tajikistan manager Khakim Fuzailov.

On 3 June 2017, Levchenko resigned as manager of Barkchi Hisor and Tajikistan U20, and the assistant manager of Tajikistan, to take up a coaching position at Krylia Sovetov.

On 16 April 2019, Levchenko was appointed as the new manager of FC Khujand.

On 17 February 2020, Levchenko was appointed as the new manager of Istiklol Dushanbe. He left Istiklol on 27 June 2022 after his contract expired.

On 2 July 2022, Levchenko was announced as the new head coach of Uzbekistan Super League club Neftchi Fergana. For the 2025 season, Levchenko led Neftchi to their first domestic league title since 2001 year.

On 3 February 2026, Levchenko returned to former club Istiklol as their new head coach, signing a contract until the end of 2026.

== Honours ==
=== Manager ===
Istiklol

- Tajikistan Higher League: 2020, 2021
- Tajik Supercup: 2020, 2021, 2022

Neftchi Ferghana

- Uzbekistan Super League: 2025
