= FC Istiklol =

Association football club in Dushanbe, Tajikistan

Istiklol Dushanbe
- Full name: Football Club Istiklol Dushanbe
- Nicknames: The Lions (Tajik: Шерҳо, romanized: Sherho)
- Short name: Istiklol
- Founded: 1 November 2007; 19 years ago
- Ground: Central Republican Stadium
- Capacity: 20,000
- Chairman: Shohruh Saidzoda
- Manager: Vitaly Levchenko
- League: Ligai Olii Tojikiston
- 2025: Ligai Olii Tojikiston, 1st of 10 (champions)
- Website: fc-istiklol.tj
Home colours	Away colours

Football Club Istiklol (Tajik: Клуби Футболи Истиқлол, romanized: Klubi futboli «Istiqlol») is a Tajik professional football club owned by Maldivian Conglomerate Maziya. Founded in 2007, the club competes in the Ligai Olii Tojikiston, the top flight of Tajik football league system. It was founded to commemorate the Independence of Tajikistan; Istiklol in Tajik Persian means 'independence'.

== History ==
=== Early years (2007–2009) ===
Istiklol Dushanbe was established in November 2007, under the Presidency of Shohruh Saidov. In 2008, Istiklol competed in the Dushanbe Group of the Second Division under head coach Kanoat Latifov, winning all 30 league games with a +154 goal difference and winning promotion to the Tajik League.

In 2009, in their debut in the Tajik League, led by new head coach Salohiddin Gafurov, the team finished fourth. The team had some experienced players and some young players mostly from Tajikistan national under-17 football team that won bronze in AFC U-17 Championship 2006 and reached round 16 at 2007 FIFA U-17 World Championship, winning two trophies – the traditional winter-spring tournament Rustam Doltabaev and the Tajik Cup. Dilshod Vasiev scored the club's first Tajik League goal in their 2–0 victory over Ravshan Kulob on 4 April 2009.

=== 2010s ===
In 2010, under coach Alimzhon Rafikov the team won the Super Cup, the national cup and league. In the first Tajik Super Cup, defeating three-time national champion Vakhsh Qurghonteppa 2–0, following two goals from Dilshod Vasiev in extra time. In the final of the 2010 Tajik Cup, which traditionally takes place on 5 October – the birthday of the country's president Emomali Rahmon, Istiqlol with large score 5–0 defeated FK Khujand. Following victory in the 2010 Tajik League, FC Istiqlol qualified for the first time for both the CIS Cup and the 2011 AFC President's Cup. On 20 March 2012, Istiklol's contract with Rafikov had expired at the end of the 2011 season and they had decided not to renew it, with Mubin Ergashev taking over in a caretaker capacity.

As of January 2014 the club's manager has been Mubin Ergashev.

On 22 November 2015, Manuel Bleda scored the club's 500th league goal. Istiklol's 4–2 victory over Barki Tajik on 17 April 2016, saw the club stretch their unbeaten run in the Tajik League to 40 games, with their last defeat occurring in November 2013 against Khayr Vahdat. During this run Istiklol have scored 146 goals, conceding just 17. Also, the team was qualified for the 2015 AFC Cup final against Johor Darul Ta'zim F.C. of Malaysia, in which both teams were the finalist for the first time in the competition. Istiklol were defeated by the team with the score of 1–0 on the home soil in Dushanbe.

On 10 July 2016, Istiklol fired their entire coaching staff, including manager Mubin Ergashev. Three days later, 13 July 2016, Istiklol announced Nikola Lazarevic as their new manager.

On 25 September 2016, Istiklol suffered their first League defeat since 3 November 2013, a stretch of 51 games, 2–1 away to Ravshan Kulob. On 29 October 2016, Istiklol defeated Barki Tajik 5–1, to claim their fifth Tajik League title. Two days later, 31 October 2016, Istiklol announced that they had appointed Mukhsin Mukhamadiev for the 2017 season. On 18 September 2017, Istiklol defeated Panjshir 5–0 to secure their sixth Tajik League title. On 18 October 2017, Istiklol drew 2–2 with Bengaluru in the second leg of their Inter-zone play-off final, progressing to the final of the AFC Cup for the second time in three seasons. On 4 November 2017, Istiklol were defeated 1–0 by Al-Quwa Al-Jawiya thanks to a second half Emad Mohsin goal.

After being knocked out of the 2018 AFC Cup at the group stage, manager Mukhsin Mukhamadiev resigned as manager six days later on 22 May 2018, with Alisher Tukhtaev being appointed as acting head coach.

On 3 December 2018, Khakim Fuzailov was announced as Istiklol's new manager. Fuzailov resigned as manager of Istiklol on 27 June 2019 after they failed to progress from the group stages of the AFC Cup, with Alisher Tukhtaev being appointed as Caretaker Manager in his place. On 27 September 2019, Istiklol beat Kuktosh 6–1, to secure their eighth Tajik League title. On 24 November 2019, Istiklol won 4–2 penalties to clinch their eighth Tajik Cup title.

=== 2020s ===
On 21 January 2020, Istiklol defeated Lokomotiv Tashkent 1–0, to win their first ever AFC Champions League match. After Mubin Ergashev took charge of Istiklol for their two AFC Champions League matches, Vitaly Levchenko was appointed as the club's new manager on 17 February 2020, with Alisher Tukhtaev returning to an assistants role.

On 10 September 2020, the 2020 AFC Cup was cancelled. 10 days later, 20 September 2020, Istiklol drew 1–1 with Khatlon to secure their ninth league title and seventh in a row.

On 13 April, Istiklol announced former manager Mubin Ergashev as their interim manager for their AFC Champions League group games due to having the required Pro Coaching License Vitaly Levchenko did not. Istiklol finished their first AFC Champions League group stage top of their group, which included Al Hilal, Shabab Al Ahli and AGMK, qualifying for the knockout stage where they faced Persepolis.

On 21 June 2021, Ryota Noma scored the club's 800th league goal. On 21 November 2021, Istiklol defeated Dushanbe-83 8–0 to secure their 10th league title, and 8th in a row. On 27 June 2022, Vitaly Levchenko and his coaching staff left Istiklol after their contracts expired, with Assistant Manager Alisher Tukhtaev being placed in interim charger.

On 29 October 2022, Alisher Tukhtaev guided Istiklol to their ninth Tajik Cup title with a 5–3 victory on penalties over Kuktosh Rudaki after the match finished 2–2. Six days later, 4 November 2022, Istiklol beat Khatlon 1–0 to secure their 11th Tajikistan Higher League title, and 9th in a row.

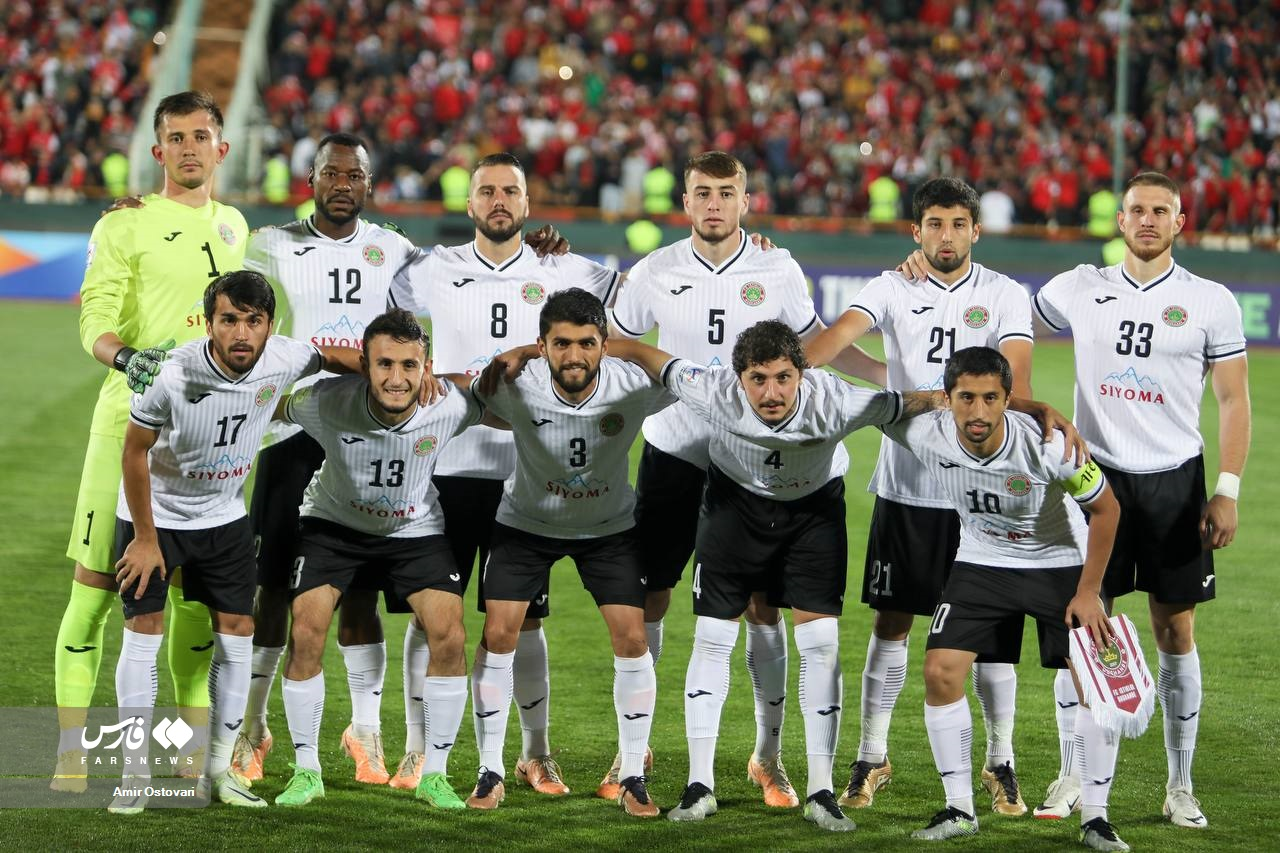
Istiklol squad against Persepolis in the 2023 AFC champions league at Azadi Stadium.

On 18 January 2023, Igor Cherevchenko was appointed as the new head coach of Istiklol on a one-year contract.

On 1 November 2023, Istiklol defeated Ravshan Kulob 4–2 on penalties in the 2023 Tajikistan Cup Final, after an initial 1–1 draw, to claim their 10th Tajikistan Cup title. A month later, on 1 December 2023, Istiklol defeated Kuktosh Rudaki 4–1 to secure their 10th league title in a row, and 12th overall. On 11 February 2024, Istiklol announced that Igor Cherevchenko, Yuri Baturenko, Alisher Tukhtaev and Lilia Sidorkina had all left the club after their contracts had expired. On 15 March 2024, Istiklol announced that Nikola Lazarevic had been appointed as their new head coach on a one-year contract.

On 19 June 2024, Ehson Panjshanbe scored the club's 1,000th league goal.

On 4 October 2024, Istiklol announced the return of Igor Cherevchenko as their head coach after Nikola Lazarevic had left his role as head coach in mid-September 2024. On 1 November 2024, Istiklol were crowned Champions of Tajikistan for the thirteenth time, after closest challengers Khujand were defeated 1–0 by Vakhsh Bokhtar.

On 8 December 2025, Istiklol secured their 14th Tajikistan title after a 1–1 draw with Vakhsh Bokhtar, and qualified for the 2026–27 AFC Challenge League in the process. On 29 December 2025, Istiklol announced that the contracts of Igor Cherevchenko and his coaching staff had expired and that they had left the club.

On 3 February 2026, Istiklol announced the appointment of Vitaly Levchenko as their new head coach on a contract until the end of 2026.

=== Sponsorship ===
Period	Kit manufacturer	Shirt sponsor
2010–2012	Li-Ning	
2013–2016	Joma	Dushanbe International Airport
2017–2019	Joma	Avesto
2020–	Joma	Siyoma

=== Domestic history ===
Season	League									Tajik Cup	Top goalscorer		Manager
Season	Div.	Pos.	Pl.	W	D	L	GS	GA	P	Tajik Cup	Name	League	Manager
2008	2nd	1st	30	30	0	0	186	28	90	-	Khudoidod Nusratov	85	(Tajikistan) Kanat Latifov
2009	1st	4th	18	11	3	4	41	18	36	Winner	Yusuf Rabiev	14	(Tajikistan) Kanat Latifov (Tajikistan) Salohiddin Ghafurov
2010	1st	1st	32	26	6	0	76	17	84	Winner	Yusuf Rabiev	30	(Tajikistan) Salohiddin Ghafurov (Tajikistan) Alimzhon Rafikov
2011	1st	1st	40	35	3	2	130	16	108	Runner-Up	Yusuf Rabiev	32	(Tajikistan) Alimzhon Rafikov
2012	1st	3rd	24	16	5	3	76	13	53	Runner-Up	Dilshod Vasiev	24	(Tajikistan) Mubin Ergashev (Caretaker) (Serbia) Nikola Kavazović
2013	1st	2nd	18	14	1	3	47	8	46	Winner	Dilshod Vasiev	10	(Serbia) Nikola Kavazović (Tajikistan) Oleg Shirinbekov
2014	1st	1st	18	16	2	0	65	10	50	Winner	Dilshod Vasiev	15	(Tajikistan) Mubin Ergashev
2015	1st	1st	18	16	2	0	69	5	50	Winner	Manuchekhr Dzhalilov	22	(Tajikistan) Mubin Ergashev
2016	1st	1st	18	14	3	1	67	20	45	Winner	Manuchekhr Dzhalilov	22	(Tajikistan) Mubin Ergashev (Serbia) Nikola Lazarevic
2017	1st	1st	21	17	4	0	64	14	55	Runner-Up	Dilshod Vasiev	16	(Tajikistan) Mukhsin Mukhamadiev
2018	1st	1st	21	16	3	2	36	16	51	Winner	Sheriddin Boboev	12	(Tajikistan) Mukhsin Mukhamadiev (Tajikistan) Alisher Tukhtaev (Caretaker)
2019	1st	1st	21	16	3	2	61	19	51	Winner	Sheriddin Boboev	16	(Tajikistan) Khakim Fuzailov (Tajikistan) Alisher Tukhtaev (Caretaker)
2020	1st	1st	18	14	3	1	61	11	45	Quarterfinal	Manuchekhr Dzhalilov	16	(Tajikistan) Vitaly Levchenko
2021	1st	1st	27	21	5	1	78	9	68	Runner-Up	Manuchekhr Dzhalilov	18	(Tajikistan) Vitaly Levchenko
2022	1st	1st	22	14	6	2	46	13	48	Winner	Manuchekhr Dzhalilov	16	(Tajikistan) Vitaly Levchenko (Tajikistan) Alisher Tukhtaev (Caretaker)
2023	1st	1st	22	16	4	2	56	12	52	Winner	Alisher Dzhalilov	13	(Tajikistan) Igor Cherevchenko
2024	1st	1st	22	19	2	1	59	11	59	Semifinal	Manuchekhr Dzhalilov	17	(Serbia) Nikola Kavazović (Tajikistan) Igor Cherevchenko
2025	1st	1st	22	15	5	2	58	18	50	Quarterfinal	Rustam Soirov	10	(Tajikistan) Igor Cherevchenko

=== Continental history ===
As of match played 23 October 2026

Competition	Pld	W	D	L	GF	GA
AFC President's Cup	10	6	3	1	20	7
AFC Cup	42	19	10	13	69	55
AFC Champions League	22	5	4	13	21	33
AFC Champions League Two	12	3	0	9	8	25
AFC Challenge League	3	1	0	2	2	3
Total	89	34	17	38	120	123

Season	Competition	Round	Club	Home	Away	Aggregate
2011	AFC President's Cup	Group B	(Palestine) Jabal Al Mukaber	2–0		1st
2011	AFC President's Cup	Group B	(Bhutan) Yeedzin	8–0		1st
2011	AFC President's Cup	Group B	(Myanmar) Yadanarbon	1–1		1st
2011	AFC President's Cup	Final Stage; Group A	(Chinese Taipei) Taipower FC	0–2		3rd
2011	AFC President's Cup	Final Stage; Group A	(Turkmenistan) Balkan	1–1		3rd
2012	AFC President's Cup	Group C	(Palestine) Markaz Shabab Al-Am'ari	1–0		1st
2012	AFC President's Cup	Group C	(Turkmenistan) Balkan	2–1		1st
2012	AFC President's Cup	Final Stage; Group A	(Kyrgyzstan) Dordoi Bishkek	2–0		1st
2012	AFC President's Cup	Final Stage; Group A	(Cambodia) Phnom Penh Crown	1–1		1st
2012	AFC President's Cup	Final	(Palestine) Markaz Shabab Al-Am'ari	2–1		
2015	AFC Cup	Group C	(Kuwait) Qadsia	2–0	2–2	1st
2015	AFC Cup	Group C	(Turkmenistan) Ahal	5–2	2–1	1st
2015	AFC Cup	Group C	(Iraq) Erbil	0–0	1–3	1st
2015	AFC Cup	Round of 16	(Syria) Al-Wahda	1–1 (p)		
2015	AFC Cup	Quarter-finals	(Malaysia) Pahang	4–0	1–3	5–3
2015	AFC Cup	Semi-finals	Al-Kuwait	w/o	0–4	w/o
2015	AFC Cup	Final	(Malaysia) Johor Darul Ta'zim	0–1		
2016	AFC Cup	Group B	(Iraq) Naft Al-Wasat	0–1	0–2	4th
2016	AFC Cup	Group B	(Jordan) Al-Faisaly	0–0	2–4	4th
2016	AFC Cup	Group B	(Lebanon) Tripoli	1–3	0–1	4th
2017	AFC Cup	Group D	(Turkmenistan) Altyn Asyr	1–0	1–1	1st
2017	AFC Cup	Group D	(Kyrgyzstan) Alay Osh	3–1	4–1	1st
2017	AFC Cup	Group D	(Kyrgyzstan) Dordoi Bishkek	2–0	4–1	1st
2017	AFC Cup	Inter-zone play-off semi-final	(Philippines) Ceres Negros	4–0	1–1	5–1
2017	AFC Cup	Inter-zone play-off final	(India) Bengaluru	1–0	2–2	3–2
2017	AFC Cup	Final	(Iraq) Al-Quwa Al-Jawiya	0–1		
2018	AFC Cup	Group D	(Kyrgyzstan) Alay Osh	1–0	3–2	2nd
2018	AFC Cup	Group D	(Turkmenistan) Altyn Asyr	2–3	2–2	2nd
2018	AFC Cup	Group D	(Turkmenistan) Ahal	1–0	1–0	2nd
2019	AFC Champions League	Preliminary round 2	(Uzbekistan) AGMK	2–4		
2019	AFC Cup	Group D	(Kyrgyzstan) Dordoi Bishkek	4–1	1–2	2nd
2019	AFC Cup	Group D	(Turkmenistan) Altyn Asyr	1–1	1–1	2nd
2019	AFC Cup	Group D	(Tajikistan) Khujand	3–0	2–3	2nd
2020	AFC Champions League	Preliminary round 2	(Uzbekistan) Lokomotiv Tashkent	1–0		
2020	AFC Champions League	Play-off round	(Saudi Arabia) Al-Ahli	0–1		
2020	AFC Cup	Group D	(Kyrgyzstan) Dordoi Bishkek	—N/a	—N/a	-
2020	AFC Cup	Group D	(Turkmenistan) Altyn Asyr	—N/a	—N/a	-
2020	AFC Cup	Group D	(Tajikistan) Khujand	2–0	—N/a	-
2021	AFC Champions League	Group A	(Saudi Arabia) Al Hilal	4–1	1–3	1st
2021	AFC Champions League	Group A	(United Arab Emirates) Shabab al-Ahli	0–0	1–0	1st
2021	AFC Champions League	Group A	(Uzbekistan) AGMK	1–2	3–2	1st
2021	AFC Champions League	Round of 16	(Iran) Persepolis	0–1		
2022	AFC Champions League	Group A	(Saudi Arabia) Al Hilal	0–3	0–1	4th
2022	AFC Champions League	Group A	(Qatar) Al-Rayyan	2–3	0–1	4th
2022	AFC Champions League	Group A	(United Arab Emirates) Sharjah	2–0	1–2	4th
2023–24	AFC Champions League	Group E	(Iran) Persepolis	1–1	0–2	4th
2023–24	AFC Champions League	Group E	(Qatar) Al-Duhail	0–0	0–2	4th
2023–24	AFC Champions League	Group E	(Saudi Arabia) Al Nassr	1–1	1–3	4th
2024–25	AFC Champions League 2	Group C	(Iran) Sepahan	0–2	0–4	4th
2024–25	AFC Champions League 2	Group C	(Jordan) Al-Wehdat	0–1	0–1	4th
2024–25	AFC Champions League 2	Group C	(United Arab Emirates) Sharjah	0–1	1–3	4th
2025–26	AFC Champions League 2	Group D	(Saudi Arabia) Al Nassr	0–4	0–5	3rd
2025–26	AFC Champions League 2	Group D	(Iraq) Al-Zawraa	2–1	1–2	3rd
2025–26	AFC Champions League 2	Group D	(India) Goa	2–0	2–1	3rd
2026–27	AFC Challenge League	Group B	(Kuwait) Al-Arabi	2–0		3rd
2026–27	AFC Challenge League	Group B	(Lebanon) Nejmeh	0–1		3rd
2026–27	AFC Challenge League	Group B	(Syria) Homs Al Fidaa	0–2		3rd

== Controversy ==
Istiklol was founded and is said to be owned by Rustam Emomali, the son and heir apparent of the president of Tajikistan, Emomali Rahmon, who also served captain of the team until 2012. On 14 June 2011, an Istiklol victory after a disputed play was awarded to them by referees led to violent riots that saw 16 people injured and at least 20 arrested. In 2012, five players of rival team Ravshan Kulob were sanctioned with suspensions or fines for "unruly behavior" after defeating Istiklol 1–0.

== Honours ==
=== Domestic ===
- Tajik League
  - Winners (14): 2010, 2011, 2014, 2015, 2016, 2017, 2018, 2019, 2020, 2021, 2022, 2023, 2024, 2025
- Tajikistan Cup
  - Winners (10): 2009, 2010, 2013, 2014, 2015, 2016, 2018, 2019, 2022, 2023
- Tajik Supercup
  - Winners (13): 2010, 2011, 2012, 2014, 2015, 2016, 2018, 2019, 2020, 2021, 2022 2024, 2025
- TFF Cup
  - Winners (7): 2014, 2015, 2017, 2018, 2019, 2021, 2025

=== Continental ===
- AFC Challenge League
  - Winners (1): 2012
- AFC Champions League Two
  - Runners-up (2): 2015, 2017

=== Individual ===
- Tajikistan's Most Valuable Player of year 2010: Yusuf Rabiev
- Tajikistan Best defender award for year 2010: Eraj Rajabov
- Tajikistan's Coach of year 2010: Alimzhon Rafikov

== Current squad ==
As of 30 July 2026

Note: Flags indicate national team as defined under FIFA eligibility rules; some limited exceptions apply. Players may hold more than one non-FIFA nationality.

No.	Pos.	Nation	Player
3	DF	TJK	Tabrez Islomov
5	DF	TJK	Sodikjon Kurbonov
6	MF	TJK	Amirbek Juraboev
9	FW	TJK	Rustam Soirov
8	FW	UKR	Oleksiy Shchebetun
10	MF	TJK	Alisher Dzhalilov (Captain)
11	MF	TJK	Mukhammadzhon Rakhimov
12	MF	TJK	Mekhrubon Odilzoda
14	MF	TJK	Alisher Shukurov
17	MF	TJK	Ehson Panjshanbe
20	FW	TJK	Daler Sharipov
21	DF	TJK	Romish Jalilov
22	GK	TJK	Muzaffar Safaralii

No.	Pos.	Nation	Player
23	DF	TJK	Alidzhon Karomatullozoda
26	DF	CRO	Frane Ikić
44	DF	TJK	Mustafa Kasanbekov
50	DF	CRO	Josip Tomašević
55	DF	TJK	Manuchekhr Safarov
63	FW	TJK	Shahrom Samiev
66	DF	TJK	Vahdat Hanonov
77	DF	RUS	Mikhail Tikhonov
78	GK	RUS	Denis Kavlinov
80	FW	TJK	Masrur Gafurov
88	MF	TJK	Shervoni Mabatshoyev
99	GK	TJK	Mukhriddin Khasanov
—	MF	TJK	Alidzhoni Ayni

=== Out on loan ===
Note: Flags indicate national team as defined under FIFA eligibility rules; some limited exceptions apply. Players may hold more than one non-FIFA nationality.

No.	Pos.	Nation	Player
12	FW	TJK	Mukhammad Nazriev (at Sardor)
66	DF	TJK	Rustam Kamolov (at Barkchi Hisor)

=== Notable players ===
Foreign players who've played for Istiklol. Players whose name is listed in bold represented their countries while playing for Istiklol.

Tajikistan

- (Tajikistan) **Oybek Abdugafforov**
- (Tajikistan) **Jahongir Aliev**
- (Tajikistan) **Siyovush Asrorov**
- (Tajikistan) Alidzhoni Ayni
- (Tajikistan) **Nozim Babadjanov**
- (Tajikistan) **Sheriddin Boboyev**
- (Tajikistan) **Tabrezi Davlatmir**
- (Tajikistan) **Nuriddin Davronov**
- (Tajikistan) **Alisher Dzhalilov**
- (Tajikistan) **Iskandar Dzhalilov**
- (Tajikistan) **Manuchekhr Dzhalilov**
- (Tajikistan) **Zoir Dzhuraboyev**
- (Tajikistan) **Davronjon Ergashev**
- (Tajikistan) **Jahongir Ergashev**
- (Tajikistan) **Fatkhullo Fatkhulloyev**
- (Tajikistan) **Daler Imomnazarov**
- (Tajikistan) Odil Irgashev
- (Tajikistan) **Jakhongir Jalilov**
- (Tajikistan) **Romish Jalilov**
- (Tajikistan) **Amirbek Juraboev**
- (Tajikistan) **Bakhtior Kalandarov**
- (Tajikistan) **Alidzhon Karomatullozoda**
- (Tajikistan) **Vahdat Hanonov**
- (Tajikistan) **Mukhriddin Khasanov**
- (Tajikistan) Akmal Kholmatov
- (Tajikistan) **Shokhrukh Kirgizboev**
- (Tajikistan) **Khurshed Makhmudov**
- (Tajikistan) **Shervoni Mabatshoyev**
- (Tajikistan) **Akhtam Nazarov**
- (Tajikistan) **Ehson Panjshanbe**
- (Tajikistan) **Yusuf Rabiev**
- (Tajikistan) **Eraj Rajabov**
- (Tajikistan) **Mukhammadzhon Rakhimov**
- (Tajikistan) **Manuchekhr Safarov**
- (Tajikistan) **Kamil Saidov**
- (Tajikistan) **Shahrom Samiev**
- (Tajikistan) **Daler Sharipov**
- (Tajikistan) **Faridoon Sharipov**
- (Tajikistan) **Umedzhon Sharipov**
- (Tajikistan) **Alisher Shukurov**
- (Tajikistan) **Mahmadali Sodikov**
- (Tajikistan) **Rustam Soirov**
- (Tajikistan) **Shakhrom Sulaymonov**
- (Tajikistan) **Sokhib Suvonkulov**
- (Tajikistan) **Farkhod Tokhirov**
- (Tajikistan) **Komron Tursunov**
- (Tajikistan) **Alisher Tuychiev**
- (Tajikistan) **Naim Ulmasov**
- (Tajikistan) **Parvizdzhon Umarbayev**
- (Tajikistan) **Dilshod Vasiyev**
- (Tajikistan) Farkhod Vasiyev
- (Tajikistan) **Rustam Yatimov**
- (Tajikistan) **Islom Zoirov**

Former USSR countries

- (Armenia) **Artur Kartashyan**
- (Armenia) **Ruslan Koryan**
- (Belarus) Uladzislaw Kasmynin
- (Belarus) Sergey Tikhonovsky
- (Belarus) Mikalay Zyanko
- (Russia) Dmitry Barkov
- (Russia) Nikita Chicherin
- (Russia) Shams Dzhumabaev
- (Russia) Denis Kavlinov
- (Russia) Aleksandr Kudryashov
- (Russia) Artyom Petrenko
- (Russia) Ruslan Rafikov
- (Russia) Kirill Suslov
- (Russia) Viktor Svezhov
- (Russia) Mikhail Tikhonov
- (Russia) Luka Zgursky
- (Russia) Robert Zhilin
- (Turkmenistan) **Wahyt Orazsähedow**
- (Ukraine) Artem Baranovskyi
- (Ukraine) Dmytro Bilonoh
- (Ukraine) Oleksandr Harbar
- (Ukraine) Hlib Hrachov
- (Ukraine) Oleksandr Kablash
- (Ukraine) Petro Kovalchuk
- (Ukraine) Oleksiy Larin
- (Ukraine) Andriy Mishchenko
- (Ukraine) Temur Partsvania
- (Ukraine) Oleksiy Shchebetun
- (Ukraine) Oleksandr Stetsenko
- (Ukraine) Ivan Zotko
- (Uzbekistan) **Jahongir Abdumominov**
- (Uzbekistan) Marlen Chobanov
- (Uzbekistan) Jalil Kimsanov
- (Uzbekistan) Mukhammad Isaev
- (Uzbekistan) Davron Mirzaev
- (Uzbekistan) Farkhod Yuldoshev

South America

- (Argentina) Gonzalo Ritacco
- (Brazil) Glaúber
- (Brazil) Murilo Souza
- (Brazil) Willer
- (Brazil) Jocimar Nascimento

Europe

- (Albania) Rudolf Turkaj
- (Bosnia and Herzegovina) Dženis Beganović
- (Bulgaria) Dimitar Mitkov
- (Bulgaria) Petar Patev
- (Croatia) Frane Čirjak
- (Croatia) Frane Ikić
- (Croatia) Ivan Novoselec
- (Croatia) Josip Tomašević
- (Germany) Alexander Frank
- (Italy) Francesco Margiotta
- (North Macedonia) Darko Ilieski
- (Netherlands) Hüseyin Doğan
- (Serbia) Mihajlo Cakić
- (Serbia) Slavko Lukić
- (Serbia) Marko Milić
- (Serbia) Nikola Stošić
- (Spain) José Ballester

Asia

- (Afghanistan) Khomid Golami
- (Australia) Matthew Millar
- (Hong Kong) Manolo Bleda
- (Iran) Mehdi Chahjouyi
- (Iran) Reza Dehghani
- (Iran) Mojtaba Moghtadaei
- (Iran) Siavash Hagh Nazari
- (Iran) Hossein Sohrabi
- (Japan) Ryota Noma
- (Japan) Keita Suzuki

Africa

- (Gabon) Eric Bocoum
- (Ghana) Iddris Aminu
- (Ghana) Benjamin Awuku
- (Ghana) Silvanus Evans
- (Ghana) David Mawutor
- (Ivory Coast) Cédric Gogoua
- (Ivory Coast) Senin Sebai
- (Nigeria) Blessing Eleke
- (Nigeria) Joshua Akpudje
- (Nigeria) Paul Komolafe
- (Nigeria) Lawrence Nicholas
- (Nigeria) Joseph Okoro
- (Uganda) **Eugene Sseppuya**

== Club officials ==
Management team

- Sporting director: Nuriddin Davronov
- Head coach: Vitaly Levchenko
- Assistant coach: Andriy Annenkov
- Coach: Alisher Tukhtaev
- Fitness coach: Anvar Norkulov
- Goalkeeping coach: Farrukh Berdiev
- Youth Team Manager: Rustam Kurbanov
- Youth team assistant manager: Daler Kayosov
- Administrator: Odil Irgashev
- Doctor: Farrukh Avezov
- Physiotherapist: Erkin Dodojonov
- Rehabilitologist: Vacant

== Records ==
=== Top goalscorers ===
As of match played 7 November 2026

	Name	Years	League	Tajikistan Cup	Tajik Supercup	Asia	Total
1	(Tajikistan) Manuchekhr Dzhalilov	2015–2017; 2020–2025	141 (148)	29 (27)	1 (7)	17 (50)	188 (232)
2	(Tajikistan) Dilshod Vasiyev	2009–2019	87+ (104+)	28+ (30+)	4 (7)	12 (42)	131 (183+)
3	(Tajikistan) Khudoidod Nusratov	2008–2010	88 (?)	? (?)	0 (1)	(-)	88 (?)
4	(Tajikistan) Yusuf Rabiev	2009–2012	83 (?)	? (?)	1 (3)	1 (9)	85 (12+)
5	(Tajikistan) Alisher Dzhalilov	2019–2022; 2023–Present	58 (127)	7 (21)	1 (7)	6 (34)	72 (189)
6	(Tajikistan) Fatkhullo Fatkhulloyev	2008–2017; 2018–2019	45+ (103+)	12+ (27+)	1 (9)	11 (51)	69 (190+)
7	(Tajikistan) Sheriddin Boboev	2015–2020	40 (64)	12 (14)	0 (2)	1 (12)	53 (92)
8	(Tajikistan) Rustam Soirov	2020–2022; 2024–Present	43 (96)	4 (13)	2 (6)	3 (28)	52 (143)
9	(Tajikistan) Ehson Panjshanbe	2016–2020; 2023–2024; 2025; 2026–Present	32 (117)	8 (26)	0 (4)	2 (40)	42 (187)
10	(Tajikistan) Shervoni Mabatshoev	2021–2024; 2026–Present	28 (82)	7 (21)	0 (3)	0 (22)	35 (128)

=== Managers ===
Information correct as of match played 7 November 2026. Only competitive matches are counted, Managers in italics were hired as interim or caretaker managers.

Name	From	To	Duration	P	W	D	L	GS	GA	Win %	Honours	Notes
(Serbia) Nikola Kavazović	January 2012	June 2013	1 year, 151 days	46	36	6	4	129	22	78.26	AFC Presidents Cup (1); Supercup (1)	
(Tajikistan) Oleg Shirinbekov	July 2013	13 January 2014	226 days	12	9	1	2	26	5	75	Cup (1)	
(Tajikistan) Mubin Ergashev	13 January 2014	10 July 2016	2 years, 179 days	78	56	13	9	251	66	71.79	League (2); Cup (2); Supercup (3)	
(Serbia) Nikola Lazarevic	13 July 2016	31 December 2016	153 days	16	11	4	1	62	13	68.75	League (1); Cup (1)	
(Tajikistan) Mukhsin Mukhamadiev	1 January 2017	22 May 2018	1 year, 141 days	53	38	10	5	130	47	71.7	League (1); Supercup (1)	
(Tajikistan) Alisher Tukhtaev	22 May 2018	3 December 2018	195 days	20	15	12	3	44	20	75	League (1); Cup (1)	
(Tajikistan) Khakim Fuzailov	3 December 2018	27 June 2019	206 days	16	10	3	3	44	20	62.5	Supercup (1)	
(Tajikistan) Alisher Tukhtaev	27 June 2019	31 December 2019	187 days	20	14	4	2	62	19	75	League (1)	
(Tajikistan) Mubin Ergashev	1 January 2020	17 February 2020	47 days	2	1	0	1	1	1	50		
(Tajikistan) Vitaly Levchenko	17 February 2020	27 June 2022	2 years, 130 days	59	47	9	3	186	29	79.66	Supercup (2); League (2)	
(Tajikistan) Mubin Ergashev	13 April 2021	14 September 2021	154 days	7	3	1	3	10	9	42.86		Took charge of the 2021 AFC Champions League matches
(Tajikistan) Mubin Ergashev	8 April 2022	28 April 2022	20 days	6	1	0	5	5	10	16.67		Took charge of the 2022 AFC Champions League matches
(Tajikistan) Alisher Tukhtaev	27 June 2022	18 January 2023	205 days	20	12	6	2	34	12	60	League (1); Cup (1)	
(Tajikistan) Igor Cherevchenko	18 January 2023	11 February 2024	1 year, 24 days	34	19	9	6	69	25	55.88	League (1); Cup (1)	
(Serbia) Nikola Lazarevic	15 March 2024	15 September 2024	184 days	20	18	1	1	62	12	90	Supercup (1)	
(Tajikistan) Alisher Tukhtaev	15 September 2024	4 October 2024	19 days	3	0	0	3	0	7	0	League (1); Cup (1)	
(Tajikistan) Igor Cherevchenko	4 October 2024	29 December 2025	1 year, 86 days	43	23	10	10	86	44	53.49	League (2); Supercup (1)	
(Tajikistan) Vitaly Levchenko	3 February 2026		286 days	26	15	5	6	30	15	57.69		

- Notes:

P – Total of played matches W – Won matches D – Drawn matches L – Lost matches GS – Goal scored GA – Goals against
%W – Percentage of matches won

Nationality is indicated by the corresponding FIFA country code(s).

== See also ==
- Esteghlal
- Esteghlal Ahvaz
- Esteghlal Khuzestan
