= Rakhmatullo Fuzaylov =

Tajik footballer

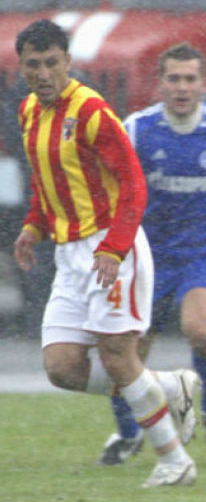

Personal information
- Full name: Rakhmatullo Kayumovich Fuzaylov
- Date of birth: 16 September 1978 (age 48)
- Place of birth: Dushanbe, Tajikistan
- Height: 1.78 m (5 ft 10 in)
- Position: Defender

Team information
- Current team: Tajikistan U17 (manager)

Senior career*
Years	Team	Apps	(Gls)
1994	Sitora Dushanbe		
1995	CSKA Pamir Dushanbe		
1996–1997	Neftchi Fargʻona	50	(0)
1997	Dynamo Dushanbe		
1998–1999	Buxoro	55	(4)
1999–2000	Dinamo Samarqand	18	(3)
2000–2004	Shinnik Yaroslavl	117	(5)
2005	Alania Vladikavkaz	12	(0)
2006	Lada-Togliatti	18	(0)
2007	Nosta Novotroitsk	19	(0)
2007	CSKA Dushanbe		
2008	Zvezda Irkutsk	4	(0)
2008	Energetik Dushanbe		
2009	Vakhsh Qurghonteppa		
2010	CSKA Pamir Dushanbe		
2011	Regar-TadAZ		
2012	CSKA Pamir Dushanbe		

International career
1997–2010	Tajikistan	18	(2)

Managerial career
- 2016: CSKA Pamir Dushanbe
- 2019–2021: Kuktosh
- 2020–2021: Tajikistan U19 (assistant)
- 2021: Istaravshan
- 2022: Ravshan Zafarobod
- 2022–: Tajikistan U17
- * Club domestic league appearances and goals

Rakhmatullo Kayumovich Fuzaylov (Russian: Рахматулло Каюмович Фузайлов; born 16 September 1978) is a Tajik retired professional footballer, and football coach. He is the manager of the Tajikistan national under-17 team.

== Career ==
=== Club ===
Fuzaylov spent the early part of his career in Tajikistan and Uzbekistan, finishing runner up in the Uzbek League with Neftchi Fargʻona in 1996 and 1997. In 2000 Fuzaylov moved to Russia, signing with Shinnik Yaroslavl. In 2005 Fuzaylov joined Alania Vladikavkaz for a year, before spending a year with Lada-Togliatti and six months with Nosta Novotroitsk before heading back to Tajikistan for personal reasons. Fuzaylov returned to Russia for a brief spell with Zvezda Irkutsk before again returning to Tajikistan to see out the remainder of his career with Energetik Dushanbe, Vakhsh Qurghonteppa, Regar-TadAZ and CSKA Pamir Dushanbe.

=== Managerial ===
In July 2016, Fuzaylov left his position of manager of CSKA Pamir Dushanbe following a poor run of results.

On 20 February 2019, Fuzaylov was announced the new manager of Kuktosh Rudaki.

== Career statistics ==
=== International ===
Tajikistan national team
Year	Apps	Goals
1997	4	0
1998	0	0
1999	2	0
2000	2	1
2001	0	0
2002	0	0
2003	6	1
2004	3	0
2005	0	0
2006	0	0
2007	0	0
2008	0	0
2009	0	0
2010	1	0
Total	18	2

Statistics accurate as of match played 26 June 2010

=== International goals ===
Scores and results list Tajikistan's goal tally first.

#	Date	Venue	Opponent	Score	Result	Competition
1.	26 November 2000	Takhti Stadium, Tabriz, Iran	Guam	9–0	16–0	2002 FIFA World Cup qualification
2.	6 November 2003	JAR Stadium, Tashkent, Uzbekistan	Thailand	1–0	1–0	2004 AFC Asian Cup qualification

== Personal life ==
Fuzaylov's older brother, Khakim Fuzailov, was also a professional football coach and player.
