= Alisher Tukhtaev =

Tajikistan footballer (born 1975)

Personal information
- Date of birth: 24 August 1975 (age 51)
- Position: Midfielder

Senior career*
Years	Team	Apps	(Gls)
1993–1995	Sitora Dushanbe		
1996	Dynamo Dushanbe		
1997	Saddam-Faizali Sarband		
2000	Regar-TadAZ		
2001–2002	Zhetysu	54	(3)
2003	Thể Công Hà Nội		
2005–2007	Regar-TadAZ		

International career
1997–2004	Tajikistan	6	(1)

Managerial career
- 2018: Tajikistan
- 2018: Istiklol (caretaker)
- 2019: Istiklol (caretaker)
- 2022: Istiklol (interim)
- 2024–: Istiklol (interim)
- * Club domestic league appearances and goals

Alisher Tukhtaev (born 24 August 1975) is a retired Tajikistani footballer who played for the Tajikistan national football team and current coach at FC Istiklol.

== Managerial career ==
On 22 May 2018, Tukhtaev was appointed acting head coach of FC Istiklol after the resignation of Mukhsin Mukhamadiev.

On 27 June 2019, he was again appointed acting head coach of Istiklol, this time after the resignation of Khakim Fuzailov.

Following the appointment of Vitaly Levchenko as Istiklol's new manager on 17 February 2020, Tukhtaev returned to his role as assistant manager.

On 27 June 2022, he was once again put in interim charge of Istiklol following the expiration of Vitaly Levchenko's contract.

On May 14, 2025, Alisher Tukhtaev was appointed head coach of the Regar-TadAZ.

== Career statistics ==
Tajikistan national team
Year	Apps	Goals
1997	3	1
2000	1	0
2004	2	2
Total	6	1

#	Date	Venue	Opponent	Score	Result	Competition
1.	24 August 1997	Dushanbe, Tajikistan	South Korea	4–1	4–1	Friendly

== Managerial statistics ==
As of match played 11 November 2018 Only competitive matches are counted.

Team	From	To	P	W	D	L	GS	GA	%W	Honours	Notes
(Tajikistan) Istiklol	22 May 2018	3 December 2018	20	15	2	3	44	20	75.00		
(Tajikistan) Istiklol	27 June 2019	17 February 2020	20	14	4	2	62	19	70.00		

== Honours ==
Sitora Dushanbe

- Tajik League (2): 1993, 1994
- Tajik Cup (1): 1993

Dynamo Dushanbe

- Tajik League (1): 1996

Regar-TadAZ

- Tajik League (2): 2006, 2007
- Tajik Cup (1): 2000, 2005, 2006
