= TFF Cup =

- Organiser(s): Tajikistan Football Federation
- Founded: 2012
- Region: Tajikistan
- Current champions: Istiklol (7th title)
- Most championships: Istiklol (7 titles)
- Broadcaster: TFF Futbol
- Website: fft.tj
- 2025

TFF Cup (Tajikistan Football Federation Cup) (Tajik: Ҷоми Федератсияи футболи Тоҷикистон, Jomi Federaciyai futboli Tojikiston; Russian: Кубок Федерации футбола Таджикистана) is a football tournament in Tajikistan, organized by the Tajikistan Football Federation. Founded in 2012. The tournament is the successor of the Memorial Rustam Doltabaev. Traditionally held from mid-January to mid-February, before the beginning of the new season of the Tajikistan Football League.

== All finals ==
Information taken from the official website of the Tajikistan Football Federation and RSSSF.

Year	Winner	Score	Runner-up
2012	Regar-TadAZ	1–0	Khayr Vahdat
2013	Khayr Vahdat	1–1 (6–5 in penalties)	CSKA Pamir
2014	Istiklol	2–0	Khayr Vahdat
2015	Istiklol	5–1	Khayr Vahdat
2016	Regar-TadAZ	1–0	Khujand
2017	Istiklol	2–1	Regar-TadAZ
2018	Istiklol	3–1	Regar-TadAZ
2019	Istiklol	5–2	Kuktosh Rudaki
2020	Kuktosh Rudaki	2–1	Ravshan Kulob
2021	Istiklol	1–0	Khatlon
2022	Regar-TadAZ	4–0	Hosilot Farkhor
2023	CSKA Pamir	2–1	Regar-TadAZ
2024	Ravshan Kulob	1–0	Hosilot Farkhor
2025	Istiklol	2–0	CSKA Pamir
