= Andrei Manannikov =

Russian footballer (born 1965)

Personal information
- Full name: Andrei Ivanovich Manannikov
- Date of birth: 5 August 1965 (age 61)
- Place of birth: Dushanbe, Tajik SSR
- Height: 1.85 m (6 ft 1 in)
- Position: Goalkeeper

Youth career
- ROShISP Dushanbe

Senior career*
Years	Team	Apps	(Gls)
1982–1985	Avtomobilist Termez	5	(0)
1982–1985	Pamir Dushanbe	45	(0)
1986	CSKA Moscow	1	(0)
1987–1992	Pamir Dushanbe	144	(0)
1992	Zenit St. Petersburg	25	(0)
1993	Rotor Volgograd	34	(0)
1995–1997	Anzhi Makhachkala	58	(0)
1998–1999	Metallurg Lipetsk	54	(0)
2000–2001	Dynamo-SPb St. Petersburg	16	(0)
2002	Severstal Cherepovets	13	(0)
2003	Svetogorets Svetogorsk	10	(0)

International career
1992–1996	Tajikistan	3	(0)

Managerial career
- 2005–2006: Spartak Nizhny Novgorod (GK coach)
- 2006: Spartak Nizhny Novgorod (caretaker)
- 2007: Metallurg Krasnoyarsk (assistant)
- 2008: Rīga (GK coach)
- 2008: Rīga (caretaker)
- 2009: Krymteplytsia Molodizhne (GK coach)
- * Club domestic league appearances and goals

Andrei Ivanovich Manannikov (Russian: Андрей Иванович Мананников; born 5 August 1965) is a Tajikistani professional football coach and a former player.

== Club career ==
Manannikov made his professional debut in the Soviet First League in 1982 for Pamir Dushanbe.

== Career statistics ==
As of 30 October 2015

Tajikistan national team
Year	Apps	Goals
1992	1	0
1993	0	0
1994	0	0
1995	0	0
1996	2	0
Total	3	0

== Honours ==
Pamir Dushanbe

- Tajikistan Higher League: 1992
