= Pirmurod Burkhanov =

Tajikistani footballer

Personal information
- Full name: Pirmurod Burkhanov
- Date of birth: 30 October 1977 (age 48)
- Place of birth: Tajikistan
- Position: Forward

Senior career*
Years	Team	Apps	(Gls)
1994–1995	Kuvvat Saidi		
2000–2004	Regar-TadAZ		
2005	CSKA Dushanbe		
2006	Regar-TadAZ		
2007	Shurtan Guzar		
2008	Tajik Telecom Qurghonteppa		
2009	Khujand		
2010	Energetik Dushanbe		
2011	Regar-TadAZ		
2011	Khayr Vahdat		

International career^{‡}
2003–2004	Tajikistan	7	(3)
- * Club domestic league appearances and goals as of 19 February 2016 ‡ National team caps and goals as of 19 February 2016

Pirmurod Burkhanov (born 30 October 1977) is a retired Tajikistani International footballer.

== Career statistics ==
=== International ===
Tajikistan national team
Year	Apps	Goals
2003	5	1
2004	2	2
Total	7	3

Statistics accurate as of 19 February 2016

=== International goals ===
Goals for Senior National team

#	Date	Venue	Opponent	Score	Result	Competition
1	17 November 2003	Rajamangala Stadium, Bangkok, Thailand	Uzbekistan	1–4	1–4	2004 AFC ACQ
2	18 February 2004	Spartak Stadium, Bishkek, Kyrgyzstan	Kyrgyzstan	1–1	2–1	2006 AFC Challenge Cup qualification
3	18 February 2004	Spartak Stadium, Bishkek, Kyrgyzstan	Kyrgyzstan	2–1	2–1	2006 AFC Challenge Cup qualification

== Honours ==
=== Club ===
Regar-TadAZ

- Tajik League (5): 2001, 2002, 2003, 2004, 2006
- Tajik Cup (3): 2000, 2001, 2006

Khujand

- Tajik Cup (1): 2008
