= Asliddin Khabibullaev =

Tajikistani footballer

Personal information
- Full name: Asliddin Khabibullaev
- Date of birth: 5 March 1971 (age 55)
- Place of birth: Tajik SSR, Soviet Union
- Position: Goalkeeper

Senior career*
Years	Team	Apps	(Gls)
1999	Varzob Dushanbe		
2000	Semurg Angren	12	(0)
2003–2008	Vakhsh Qurghonteppa		

International career^{‡}
1999–2006	Tajikistan	24	(0)

Managerial career
- 2008–2011: Vakhsh Qurghonteppa
- 2013: Tajikistan
- 2020–: Khatlon
- * Club domestic league appearances and goals ‡ National team caps and goals as of 14 December 2017

Asliddin Khabibullaev (born 5 March 1971) is a former Tajikistan international goalkeeper player for Tajikistan, and current manager of FC Khatlon.

== Career statistics ==
=== International ===
Tajikistan national team
Year	Apps	Goals
1999	3	0
2000	0	0
2001	0	0
2002	0	0
2003	8	0
2004	6	0
2005	0	0
2006	7	0
Total	24	0

Statistics accurate as of match played 2 July 2006

== Honours ==
=== Team ===
Varzob Dushanbe

- Tajikistan Higher League (1): 1999
- Tajikistan Cup (1): 1999

Vahsh Qurghonteppa

- Tajikistan Higher League (1): 2005
- Tajikistan Cup (1): 2003

=== Individual ===
Tajik Player of the year (1): 2003
