= Vasili Postnov =

Tajikistani footballer

Personal information
- Full name: Vasili Vasilyevich Postnov
- Date of birth: 24 March 1962
- Place of birth: Tashkent, Uzbek SSR
- Date of death: 4 March 2009 (aged 46)
- Place of death: Moscow, Russia
- Height: 1.75 m (5 ft 9 in)
- Position: Midfielder

Youth career
- Start Tashkent

Senior career*
Years	Team	Apps	(Gls)
1980–1981	FC Pakhtakor Tashkent	14	(0)
1982–1984	FC Zvezda Dzhizak	64	(5)
1985–1989	FC Pakhtakor Tashkent	170	(8)
1990–1992	FC Pamir Dushanbe	54	(1)
1992	FC Lokomotiv Moscow	13	(0)
1992	Wydad Casablanca		
1999	FC Krasnoznamensk		

International career
1992	Tajikistan	1	(0)
- * Club domestic league appearances and goals

Vasili Vasilyevich Postnov (Russian: Василий Васильевич Постнов; 24 March 1962 – 4 March 2009) was a Tajikistani professional footballer. He also held Russian citizenship.

== Club career ==
He made his professional debut in the Soviet Top League in 1980 for FC Pakhtakor Tashkent.

== Honours ==
Pamir Dushanbe

- Tajikistan Higher League (1): 1992

Wydad Casablanca

- Botola (1): 1992–93
- CAF Champions League (1): 1992
- Afro-Asian Cup (1): 1993
