= Yuri Baturenko =

Tajikistani footballer

Personal information
- Full name: Yuri Mikhailovich Baturenko
- Date of birth: 29 December 1964 (age 61)
- Place of birth: Dushanbe, Tajik SSR
- Height: 1.83 m (6 ft 0 in)
- Position: Midfielder

Team information
- Current team: FC Istiklol (assistant manager)

Senior career*
Years	Team	Apps	(Gls)
1980	FC Chashma Shaartuz		
1981	Vakhsh Qurghonteppa		
1982–1985	FC Pamir Dushanbe	64	(2)
1986	PFC CSKA Moscow	10	(0)
1987–1992	FC Pamir Dushanbe	144	(8)
1992–1995	FC Lokomotiv Moscow	52	(3)
1996–1997	FC Tyumen	49	(5)
1998	FC Sokol Saratov	4	(1)

International career
1992–1996	Tajikistan	3	(0)

Managerial career
- 2000–2004: FC Lokomotiv Moscow (reserves assistant)
- 2004: FC Baltika Kaliningrad (assistant)
- 2005: FC Lokomotiv Moscow (reserves assistant)
- 2006–2007: FC Lokomotiv Moscow (academy)
- 2007: FC Soyuz-Gazprom Izhevsk (administrator)
- 2008–2009: FC Dynamo Moscow (academy)
- 2009–2010: FC Lokomotiv Moscow (reserves assistant)
- 2011: FC Lokomotiv-2 Moscow (assistant)
- 2013–2014: Gabala FK (assistant)
- 2014–2015: FC Mordovia Saransk (assistant)
- 2015: FC Anzhi Makhachkala (assistant)
- 2016: FC Znamya Truda Orekhovo-Zuyevo (assistant)
- 2016–2020: FC Lokomotiv Moscow (assistant)
- 2021: FC Rotor Volgograd
- 2021: FC Rostov (assistant)
- 2022–: FC Istiklol (assistant)
- * Club domestic league appearances and goals

Yuri Mikhailovich Baturenko (Russian: Юрий Михайлович Батуренко; born 29 December 1964) is a Tajikistani professional football coach and a former player. He is an assistant manager with FC Istiklol.

== Playing career ==
He made his professional debut in the Soviet First League in 1983 for FC Pamir Dushanbe.

== Coaching career ==
On 20 March 2021, he was appointed manager of FC Rotor Volgograd. At the end of the season, Rotor was relegated from the Russian Premier League and Baturenko left the club on 26 May 2021.

== Honours ==
- Russian Premier League runner-up: 1995.
- Russian Premier League bronze: 1994.
- Russian Cup winner: 1996 (played in the early stages of the 1995–96 tournament for FC Lokomotiv Moscow).
