= Georgi Takhokhov =

Tajikistani footballer

Personal information
- Full name: Georgi Borisovich Takhokhov
- Date of birth: 26 September 1970 (age 56)
- Height: 1.75 m (5 ft 9 in)
- Position: Forward

Senior career*
Years	Team	Apps	(Gls)
1988–1992	Pamir Dushanbe		
1992	Spartak Vladikavkaz	1	(0)
1993–1997	Avtodor Vladikavkaz	148	(27)
1998–1999	Iriston Vladikavkaz	27	(2)
1999–2000	Vityaz Krymsk	57	(13)
2001	Slavyansk Slavyansk-na-Kubani	32	(8)
2002	Zhemchuzhina Budyonnovsk	2	(0)

International career
1992–1997	Tajikistan	3	(0)

Managerial career
- 2010: FAYUR Beslan (assistant)
- * Club domestic league appearances and goals

Georgi Borisovich Takhokhov (Russian: Георгий Борисович Тахохов; born 26 September 1970) is a Tajikistani former professional footballer.

== Club career ==
In 1992, he moved from Pamir Dushanbe to FC Spartak Vladikavkaz.

== Career statistics ==
=== International ===
Tajikistan national team
Year	Apps	Goals
1992	1	0
1993	0	0
1994	0	0
1995	0	0
1996	0	0
1997	2	0
Total	3	0

Statistics accurate as of 1 March 2016
