= Sharif Nazarov =

Tajikistani football manager (1946–2025)

Personal information
- Date of birth: 12 February 1946
- Place of birth: Tajik SSR, USSR
- Date of death: 30 December 2025 (aged 79)

Senior career*
Years	Team	Apps	(Gls)
1969–1970	Pamir	34	(0)

Managerial career
- 1986–1988: Pamir
- 1989: Al Merreikh
- 1990–1993: Pamir
- 1992–1993: Tajikistan
- 1994–1995: Navbahor Namangan
- 1997: SKA PVO Pamir
- 1998–2001: Varzob Dushanbe
- 1999: Tajikistan
- 2001–2002: Farrukh Gissar
- 2003–2005: Aviator
- 2003: Tajikistan
- 2006–2007: Hima Dushanbe
- 2006: Tajikistan
- 2008–: Tajikistan U-23
- 2009–2016: Regar-TadAZ Tursunzoda (president)
- 2016–2025: Khayr Vahdat
Medal record
Men's football
Representing Tajikistan (as manager)
AFC Challenge Cup
Winner	2006
- * Club domestic league appearances and goals

Sharif Nazarov (Tajik: Шариф Назаров; 12 February 1946 – 30 December 2025) was a Tajikistani football coach.

== Managerial career ==
As one of the most successful coaches from Tajikistan, he won the Tajik League twice with SKA-Pamir Dushanbe in 1992 and 1995; and with Varzob Dushanbe in 1999 and 2000. He won the Tajik Cup on three occasions SKA-Pamir Dushanbe in 1992, Varzob Dushanbe in 1999 and FC Aviator in 2004.

Nazarov was also the most successful head coach for the Tajikistan national team, as he led the national team to a third-place finish at the 1993 ECO Cup and won the 2006 AFC Challenge Cup.

Nazarov was appointed the manager of Khayr Vahdat on 17 March 2016.

== Death ==
Nazarov died on 30 December 2025, at the age of 79.
