= Sergei Chernousov =

Russian footballer

Personal information
- Full name: Sergei Sergeyevich Chernousov
- Date of birth: 18 March 1993 (age 33)
- Height: 1.70 m (5 ft 7 in)
- Position: Midfielder

Senior career*
| Years | Team | Apps | (Gls) |
| 2013–2015 | FC Gazovik Orenburg | 1 | (0) |
| 2014 | → FC Nosta Novotroitsk (loan) | 7 | (0) |
- * Club domestic league appearances and goals

Sergei Sergeyevich Chernousov (Russian: Сергей Сергеевич Черноусов; born 18 March 1993) is a former Russian football midfielder.

== Club career ==
He made his debut in the Russian Football National League for FC Gazovik Orenburg on 23 November 2013 in a game against FC Dynamo Saint Petersburg.
