= Akhtam Khamrakulov =

Tajikistani footballer

Personal information
- Full name: Akhtam Khamrakulov
- Date of birth: 30 January 1988 (age 38)
- Place of birth: Qurghonteppa, Tajik SSR, Soviet Union
- Height: 1.76 m (5 ft 9 1/2 in)
- Position: Striker

Team information
- Current team: Khatlon

Youth career
- 2005: Vakhsh

Senior career*
Years	Team	Apps	(Gls)
2005–2011	Vakhsh		
2011–2014	Regar-TadAZ		
2014	AZAL	7	(0)
2014	Regar-TadAZ		
2015	Khujand		
2016	Vakhsh Qurghonteppa		
2016	Regar-TadAZ		
2019–	Khatlon		

International career^{‡}
2007–	Tajikistan	24	(4)
- * Club domestic league appearances and goals as of 20 October 2019 ‡ National team caps and goals as of 13 November 2016

Akhtam Khamrakulov (born 30 January 1988 in Qurghonteppa, Soviet Union) is a Tajik footballer who plays for FC Khatlon as a striker.

== Career ==
=== Club ===
In January 2014, Khamrakulov signed for Azerbaijan Premier League side AZAL on a 2.5 year contract, however he was released by AZAL at the end of the 2013–14 season.

=== International ===
During the 2014 FIFA World Cup qualifiers, Khamrakulov was called up by Tajikistan, scoring his first goal for Tajikistan, against North Korea on 29 February 2012 in their 1–1 draw.

== Career statistics ==
=== Club ===
As of 28 February 2014

Club performance			League		Cup		Continental		Total	
Season	Club	League	Apps	Goals	Apps	Goals	Apps	Goals	Apps	Goals
2013–14	AZAL	Azerbaijan Premier League	7	0	0	0	—		7	0
Total	Azerbaijan		7	0	0	0	-		7	0
Career total			7	0	0	0	0	0	7	0

=== International ===
Tajikistan national team
Year	Apps	Goals
2007	1	0
2011	2	0
2012	6	2
2013	1	1
2014	4	0
2015	6	1
2016	4	0
Total	24	4

Statistics accurate as of match played 13 November 2016

=== International Goals ===
#	Date	Venue	Opponent	Score	Result	Competition
1.	29 February 2012	Khujand, Tajikistan	North Korea	1–1	1–1	2014 FIFA World Cup qualification
2	9 March 2012	Kathmandu, Nepal	India	1–0	2–0	2012 AFC Challenge Cup
3	14 August 2013	Khujand, Tajikistan	India	3–0	3–0	Friendly
4	31 March 2015	Dushanbe, Tajikistan	Syria	2–3	2–3	Friendly
