= Shuhrat Mamajonov =

Tajikistani footballer

Personal information
- Full name: Shuhrat Mamajonov
- Date of birth: 16 March 1970 (age 56)
- Place of birth: Dushanbe, Tajik SSR, Soviet Union
- Height: 1.82 m (5 ft 11 1/2 in)
- Position: Defender

Senior career*
Years	Team	Apps	(Gls)
1989–1992	FC Pamir Dushanbe	27	(0)
1992	FC Chornomorets Odesa	0	(0)
1993	FC Pamir Dushanbe	?	(?)
1995	FC Navbahor Namangan	4	(0)
1996	Temiryulchi Qo'qo'n	16	(3)
1997	MHSK Tashkent	8	(0)
1998–2000	Temiryulchi Qo'qo'n	34	(3)
2000–2003	FC Nasaf Qarshi	48	(2)

International career
1992–2004	Tajikistan	12	(0)

Managerial career
- 2003–???: FC Nasaf Qarshi (assistant)
- * Club domestic league appearances and goals

Shuhrat Mamajonov (born 16 March 1970) is a retired Tajikistani footballer. In 2003, he works as an assistant in FC Nasaf Qarshi.

== Career ==
Born in Dushanbe, Mamajonov played football for clubs in Tajikistan and Uzbekistan. He made 27 appearances for FC Pamir Dushanbe in the Soviet Top League.
