= Anatoli Volovodenko =

Tajik footballer

Personal information
- Date of birth: 21 July 1963 (age 63)
- Place of birth: Dushanbe, USSR
- Height: 1.80 m (5 ft 11 in)
- Position: Defender

Senior career*
Years	Team	Apps	(Gls)
1983–1992	Pamir Dushanbe	188	(6)
1992–1994	FC Uralmash Yekaterinburg	42	(3)
1995	FC Nosta Novotroitsk	17	(1)
1995–1996	FC Industriya Borovsk	56	(8)

International career
1992	Tajikistan	1	(0)
- * Club domestic league appearances and goals

Anatoli Volovodenko (Russian: Анатолий Воловоденко; born 21 July 1963) is a Tajikistani former professional footballer who started his playing career when Tajikistan was part of the Soviet Union.

== Club career ==
He made his professional debut in the Soviet First League in 1984 for Pamir Dushanbe. He then played for FC Ural and finished his career at FC Nosta Novotroitsk.
