= 2005 Tajik League =

Tajik League
- Season: 2005
- Champions: Vakhsh Qurghonteppa
- Relegated: Danghara
- Matches: 90
- Goals: 296 (3.29 per match)
- Top goalscorer: Akhtam Khamrakulov (12); Nazir Rizomov (12)

Tajik League is the top division of the Tajikistan Football Federation, it was created in 1992. These are the statistics of the Tajik League in the 2005 season.

== Table ==
Pos	Team	Pld	W	D	L	GF	GA	GD	Pts
1	Vakhsh Qurghonteppa (C)	18	15	2	1	41	12	+29	47
2	Regar-TadAZ	18	13	3	2	46	9	+37	42
3	Aviator Bobojon Ghafurov	18	10	4	4	38	20	+18	34
4	CSKA Dushanbe	18	9	1	8	31	23	+8	28
5	Khujand	18	8	3	7	28	19	+9	27
6	Hima Dushanbe	18	6	5	7	29	29	0	23
7	CSKA Pamir Dushanbe	18	5	4	9	30	36	−6	19
8	Ansol Kulob	18	4	5	9	21	29	−8	17
9	Saroykamar	18	3	2	13	18	55	−37	11
10	Danghara (R)	18	2	1	15	11	61	−50	7

Updated to match(es) played on 13 October 2015. Source: RSSF
Rules for classification: 1) points; 2) goal difference; 3) number of goals scored.
(C) Champions; (R) Relegated

== Top scorers ==
Rank	Player	Club	Goals
1	(Tajikistan) Akhtam Khamrakulov	Vakhsh Qurghonteppa	12
1	(Tajikistan) Nazir Rizomov	Vakhsh Qurghonteppa	12
3	(Tajikistan) Sukhrob Khamidov	Regar-TadAZ	11
