= Makhmadjon Khabibulloev =

Tajikistani footballer and coach

Personal information
- Full name: Makhmadjon Halimovich Khabibulloev
- Date of birth: May 8, 1965 (age 61)
- Place of birth: Tajik SSR, Soviet Union
- Position: Midfielder

Senior career*
Years	Team	Apps	(Gls)
1991	Hosilot Farkhor		
1992–1994	Ravshan Kulob		

Managerial career
- 2001–2013: Regar-TadAZ
- 2007: Tajikistan
- 2014: Daleron-Uroteppa
- 2015: Ravshan Kulob
- 2016-2017: Hosilot Fakhor
- 2018-2020: Regar-TadAZ
- 2020-2021: Kuktosh
- 2021: Istaravhsan FC
- * Club domestic league appearances and goals

Makhmadjon Khabibulloev (Tajik: Маҳмадҷон Ҳабибуллоев, born May 8, 1965, Tajikistan) is a Tajikistani football coach.

== Coaching career ==
As the most successful coach from Tajikistan, he won the Tajik League six with Regar-TadAZ Tursunzoda in 2001, 2002, 2004, 2006, 2007 and 2008. He won the Tajik Cup on five occasions Ravshan Kulob in 1994, and Regar-TadAZ Tursunzoda in 2001, 2002, 2005, 2006.

At the start of the 2015 season, Khabibulloev was appointed as manager of Ravshan Kulob, but in July 2015 resigned.

== Managerial Statistics ==
Team	Nat.	From	To	P	W	D	L	GS	GA	%W	Honours	Notes
Tajikistan	(Tajikistan)	January 2007	December 2007	7	1	3	3	12	12	14.29		
Daleron-Uroteppa	(Tajikistan)	January 2014	December 2015	18	9	6	3	20	11	50.00		
Ravshan Kulob	(Tajikistan)	February 2015	3 July 2015	9	4	2	3	17	17	44.44		

- Notes:

P – Total of played matches W – Won matches D – Drawn matches L – Lost matches GS – Goal scored GA – Goals against
%W – Percentage of matches won

== Honours ==
=== Club ===
Ravshan Kulob

- Tajik Cup (1): 1994

Regar-TadAZ

- Tajik League (6): 2001, 2002, 2003, 2004, 2006, 2007, 2008
- Tajik Cup (3): 2001, 2005, 2006
- AFC President's Cup (3): 2005, 2008, 2009

Hosilot FC

- Tajik League Raner-up-2016
- Tajik Cup: Raner-up-2016
- Super Cup: 2017

=== Personal ===
- Merited Coach of the Republic of Tajikistan
- Best Coach of Tajikistan (2006, 2008)
