= Pearson Mwanza =

Zambian footballer (1968–1997)

Personal information
- Date of birth: 1 January 1968
- Place of birth: Kitwe, Zambia
- Date of death: 23 March 1997 (aged 29)
- Place of death: Kitwe, Zambia
- Height: 1.75 m (5 ft 9 in)
- Position: Forward

Youth career
- 1983–1985: Power Dynamos

Senior career*
Years	Team	Apps	(Gls)
1985–1989	Power Dynamos		
1989	CSKA Pamir Dushanbe	3	(0)
1990–1991	Power Dynamos		
1991–1992	Al Mokawloon Al Arab		
1993–1994	Power Dynamos		
1995	Nkana		

International career
1986–1992	Zambia	15	(1)
- * Club domestic league appearances and goals

Pearson Mwanza (1 January 1968 – 23 March 1997) was a Zambian professional footballer who played as a forward. He played for the Zambia national team at international level.

== Club career ==
Born in Kitwe, Zambia, Mwanza began playing football for local side Power Dynamos' youth team when he was still a schoolboy at Ndeke A Primary School and later on went to Chamboli Secondary School in 1983 in Kitwe, where he excelled in football. He made his debut for the main team as a teenager and became a household name of Power Dynamos. He was selected in the under-20 national team and played in all the matches in which Zambia emerged the winner of the COSAFA CUP held in Malawi. He was then drafted in the senior team with the likes of Kenneth "Bubble" Malitoli and established himself as one of the regular players in the team. He later on moved to USSR and Egypt to play for CSKA Pamir Dushanbe and Al Mokawloon Al Arab. He was fondly known by most of his childhood friends and fellow footballers as Bruno Conti (nicknamed after one of the Italian footballers of the 90s).His closest friends in football circle were Kapambwe " Gentile" Mulenga; Debbie Makinka; Lios "Socrates" Makwanza; Lucky "Kumalo" Mhango; Kenneth "Bubble" Malitoli to mention but a few. He was a nature left footer and scored spectacular goals during his heyday.

On returning to Zambia, Mwanza ventured to South Africa for a brief professional career before rejoining Power Dynamos though he did not stay long there and crossed the road to Nkana F.C. in 1995 where he found a home before he decided to retire from active football.

== International career ==
Mwanza made several appearances for the Zambia national team, often named in the starting line-up by coach Samuel 'Zoom' Ndhlovu, at the expense of Europe-based professionals. Mwanza held his own in such company and played at the 1990 and 1992 African Cup of Nations finals. He also represented Zambia at the 1988 Summer Olympics in Seoul.

== Death ==
Mwanza died in Kitwe after an illness.
