= 1994 Tajik League =

Tajik League
- Season: 1994
- Champions: Sitora Dushanbe
- Matches: 240
- Goals: 819 (3.41 per match)

Tajik League is the top division of the Tajikistan Football Federation, it was created in 1992. These are the statistics of the Tajik League in the 1994 season.

== Table ==
Pos	Team	Pld	W	D	L	GF	GA	GD	Pts
1	Sitora Dushanbe (C)	30	21	5	4	51	17	+34	47
2	Pamir Dushanbe	30	20	5	5	75	28	+47	45
3	Pakhtakor Proletarsk	30	17	9	4	81	36	+45	43
4	Stroitel Kurgan-Tyube	30	18	5	7	68	38	+30	41
5	Shodmon Ghissar	30	14	11	5	64	25	+39	39
6	Khujand	30	14	9	7	43	23	+20	37
7	Regar-TadAZ	30	14	7	9	69	40	+29	35
8	Istaravshan	30	11	8	11	50	46	+4	30
9	Shukhrat	30	10	9	11	47	48	−1	29
10	Khulbuk Vose	30	10	8	12	55	59	−4	28
11	Pakhtakor Dushanbe	30	8	6	16	47	84	−37	22
12	Ravshan Kulob	30	9	3	18	41	71	−30	21
13	Khosilot Farkhor	30	7	4	19	34	67	−33	18
14	Saykhun Chkalovsk	30	7	3	20	35	76	−41	17
15	Kand Kanibadam (R)	30	6	2	22	32	81	−49	14
16	Chashma Shaartuz (R)	30	5	4	21	27	78	−51	14

Updated to match(es) played on 8 October 2015. Source: RSSF
Rules for classification: 1) points; 2) goal difference; 3) number of goals scored.
(C) Champions; (R) Relegated
