= FC Shodmon Ghissar =

Shodmon Hisor
- Full name: Shodmon Ghissar
- Ground: Hisor, Tajikistan
- League: Tajik League
- 2011: 10th

Shodmon Hisor (Дастаи Футболи Шодмон, Dastai Futboli Shodmon) is a Tajikistan association football club from Hisor.

== History ==
=== Domestic history ===
Season	League									Tajik Cup	Top goalscorer		Manager
Season	Div.	Pos.	Pl.	W	D	L	GS	GA	P	Tajik Cup	Name	League	Manager
1992	1st	7th	20	8	4	8	18	16	20				
1993	1st	7th	30	14	7	9	54	33	35				
1994	1st	5th	30	14	11	5	64	25	39	Runner-Up			
1995	1st	9th	28	11	5	12	38	44	38				
1996	1st	14th	30	6	3	21	25	75	21				
1997	1st	8th	24	9	6	9	41	36	33				
1998	1st	11th	22	2	5	15	17	51	11				
2011	1st	10th	40	7	2	31	44	115	23				
