= 1997 Tajik League =

Tajik League
- Season: 1997
- Champions: Vakhsh Kurgan-Tyube
- Matches: 155
- Goals: 538 (3.47 per match)
- Top goalscorer: Rustam Usmonov (20)

The 1997 Tajik League season was the sixth season of the top division of the Tajikistan Football Federation. 13 teams competed in the 1997 season.

== Table ==
Pos	Team	Pld	W	D	L	GF	GA	GD	Pts
1	Vakhsh Kurgan-Tyube (C)	24	19	2	3	69	15	+54	59
2	Ranjbar Vosse	24	18	1	5	58	26	+32	55
3	Khujand	24	16	4	4	51	20	+31	52
4	Saddam-Faizali Sarband	24	14	5	5	61	17	+44	47
5	Regar-TadAZ	24	13	4	7	50	32	+18	43
6	Ravshan Kulob	24	13	1	10	47	32	+15	40
7	Sitora Dushanbe	24	10	7	7	43	38	+5	37
8	Shodmon Ghissar	24	9	6	9	41	36	+5	33
9	Khosilot Farkhor	24	7	3	14	38	76	−38	24
10	SKA-Panjshir	24	6	5	13	41	44	−3	23
11	Pakhtakor Kabadian	24	6	0	18	19	68	−49	18
12	Pofanda Dushanbe	24	3	2	19	14	56	−42	11 (Note: Pofanda Dushanbe and Bokhtar Pyanj withdrew during the second half, and had all their matches awarded against them.)
13	Bokhtar Pyanj	24	1	0	23	6	78	−72	3

Updated to match(es) played on 8 October 2015. Source: RSSF
Rules for classification: 1) points; 2) goal difference; 3) number of goals scored.
(C) Champions
