= 1993 Tajik League =

Tajik League
- Season: 1993
- Champions: Sitora Dushanbe
- Matches: 240
- Goals: 765 (3.19 per match)

Tajik League is the top division of the Tajikistan Football Federation, it was created in 1992. These are the statistics of the Tajik League in the 1993 season.

== Table ==
Pos	Team	Pld	W	D	L	GF	GA	GD	Pts
1	Sitora Dushanbe (C)	30	27	1	2	66	22	+44	55
2	Pamir Dushanbe	30	25	2	3	93	21	+72	52
3	Pakhtakor Proletarsk	30	18	6	6	56	21	+35	42
4	Istaravshan	30	16	4	10	60	44	+16	36
5	Khujand	30	15	6	9	48	30	+18	36
6	Regar-TadAZ	30	14	8	8	62	34	+28	36
7	Shodmon Ghissar	30	14	7	9	54	33	+21	35
8	Khosilot Farkhor	30	14	6	10	47	47	0	34
9	Stroitel Kurgan-Tyube	30	12	6	12	52	60	−8	30
10	Saykhun Chkalovsk	30	12	5	13	42	43	−1	29
11	Ravshan Kulob	30	12	5	13	50	41	+9	29
12	Khulbuk Vose	28	7	6	15	38	72	−34	20
13	Kand Kanibadam	30	8	2	20	38	75	−37	18
14	Chashma Shaartuz	30	6	2	22	18	79	−61	14
15	Orzu Shakhrinau (R)	30	4	3	23	28	73	−45	11
16	Bokhtar Pyandzh (R)	30	1	1	28	13	70	−57	3

Updated to match(es) played on 8 October 2015. Source: RSSF
Rules for classification: 1) points; 2) goal difference; 3) number of goals scored.
(C) Champions; (R) Relegated

== Sources ==
https://www.rsssf.org/tablest/taji93.html
