= Oleg Sinelobov =

Uzbekistani-Russian footballer

Personal information
- Full name: Oleg Viktorovich Sinelobov
- Date of birth: 5 October 1962 (age 64)
- Place of birth: Tashkent, Uzbek SSR, Soviet Union
- Height: 1.77 m (5 ft 9 1/2 in)
- Position: Midfielder

Senior career*
Years	Team	Apps	(Gls)
1983–1984	FC Zvezda Dzhizak	62	(13)
1985–1989	FC Pakhtakor Tashkent	145	(25)
1990	Sogdiana Jizak	28	(15)
1991	Navbahor Namangan	20	(3)
1991–1992	FC Pakhtakor Tashkent	21	(10)
1992	Nuravshon Bukhara	14	(7)
1994–2003	FC Nosta Novotroitsk	220	(57)

International career
1992	Uzbekistan	5	(0)

Managerial career
- 2010–2015: FC Nosta Novotroitsk
- * Club domestic league appearances and goals

Oleg Viktorovich Sinelobov (Russian: Олег Викторович Синелобов; born 5 October 1962) is an Uzbekistani professional football coach and a former player. He also holds Russian citizenship.

He played for one season in the Soviet Top League for FC Pakhtakor Tashkent.

His son Oleg Sinelobov is now a professional footballer.
