= 1995 Tajik League =

Tajik League
- Season: 1995
- Champions: Pamir Dushanbe
- Matches: 210
- Goals: 734 (3.5 per match)
- Top goalscorer: Zokir Berdikulov (42)

Tajik League is the top division of the Tajikistan Football Federation, it was created in 1992. These are the statistics of the Tajik League in the 1995 season.

== Table ==
Pos	Team	Pld	W	D	L	GF	GA	GD	Pts
1	Pamir Dushanbe (C)	28	22	1	5	81	32	+49	67
2	Istaravshan	28	18	3	7	60	29	+31	57
3	Sitora Dushanbe	28	17	1	10	57	34	+23	52
4	Khujand	28	15	7	6	58	36	+22	52
5	Pakhtakor Dushanbe	28	13	4	11	47	35	+12	43
6	Regar-TadAZ	28	13	3	12	44	40	+4	42
7	Ravshan Kulob	28	13	2	13	55	52	+3	41
8	Khulbuk Vose	28	11	5	12	54	59	−5	38
9	Shodmon Ghissar	28	11	5	12	38	44	−6	38
10	Vakhsh Kurgan-Tyube	28	11	4	13	38	43	−5	37
11	CSKA Dushanbe	28	10	4	14	41	48	−7	34
12	Pakhtakor Proletarsk	28	9	3	16	40	57	−17	30
13	Khosilot Farkhor	28	9	2	17	43	83	−40	29
14	Shukhrat	28	9	1	18	39	50	−11	28
15	Saykhun Chkalovsk (R)	28	4	5	19	39	82	−43	17

Updated to match(es) played on 8 October 2015. Source: RSSF
Rules for classification: 1) points; 2) goal difference; 3) number of goals scored.
(C) Champions; (R) Relegated
