= Khakim Fuzaylov =

Tajikistani footballer (born 1964)

Personal information
- Full name: Khakim Kayumovich Fuzaylov
- Date of birth: 12 August 1964 (age 62)
- Place of birth: Kurgan-Tyube (today Bokhtar), Tajik SSR, Soviet Union
- Height: 1.78 m (5 ft 10 in)
- Position: Defender

Team information
- Current team: Buxoro (advisor)

Youth career
- Vakhsh Qurghonteppa

Senior career*
Years	Team	Apps	(Gls)
1982–1983	Vakhsh Qurghonteppa	29	(2)
1986–1992	Pamir Dushanbe	184	(2)
1992–1995	Lokomotiv Moscow	48	(2)
1995–1997	Arsenal Tula	84	(11)

International career
1992–1996	Tajikistan	6	(1)

Managerial career
- 1998–1999: Buxoro
- 2000–2002: Dinamo Samarqand
- 2003: Andijon
- 2004: Titan Moscow (assistant)
- 2005: Lokomotiv Kaluga
- 2005: Lokomotiv Kaluga (assistant)
- 2005–2009: Rostov (assistant)
- 2009–2011: Lokomotiv Moscow (assistant)
- 2012: Lokomotiv Tashkent (assistant)
- 2013–2014: Lokomotiv Tashkent
- 2015: Terek Grozny (scout)
- 2016–2018: Tajikistan
- 2018–2019: Istiklol
- 2020: Kuktosh Rudaki
- 2020: Kaganat
- 2020–2021: Khujand
- 2021: Dinamo Samarqand
- 2022–2023: Bukhara
- 2023–: Bukhara (advisor)
- * Club domestic league appearances and goals

Khakim Kayumovich Fuzaylov (Tajik: Хаким Каюмович Фузайлов, Russian: Хаким Каюмович Фузайлов; born 12 August 1964) is a Tajikistani professional football coach and former player who played as a defender. He works as an advisor with the Uzbekistani club Bukhara.

== Career ==
=== Club ===
Fuzaylov made his professional debut in the Soviet First League in 1986 for Pamir Dushanbe. He played 1 game in the UEFA Cup 1993–94 for Lokomotiv Moscow.

=== Managerial ===
Fuzaylov started his managing career at FK Buxoro in 1998. In 2000–2002 he served as coach in FK Dinamo-Samarqand. From 2005 to 2011 he worked as scout coach in Rostov and Lokomotiv Moscow. In 2013 Fuzaylov was appointed as head coach of Lokomotiv Tashkent. Lokomotiv Tashkent led by Fuzaylov finished the 2013 season as runners-up after Bunyodkor. On 13 February 2014 he was fired from his post after Lokomotiv could not qualify for the group stage of 2014 AFC Champions League.

Following Tajikistans failure to qualify for the 2019 Asian Cup, Fuzaylov resigned as manager.

On 3 December 2018, Fuzaylov was announced as the new manager of Istiklol. On 27 June 2019, Fuzaylov resigned as manager after Istiklol failed to progress from the group stages of the AFC Cup, with Alisher Tukhtaev being appointed as caretaker manager in his place.

On 23 December 2021, Fuzaylov left Dinamo Samarqand after getting them promoted back to the Uzbekistan Super League.

== Personal life ==
Fuzaylov's younger brother Rahmatullo Fuzailov is also a professional footballer.

== Career statistics ==
=== International ===
Appearances and goals by national team and year
National team	Year	Apps	Goals
Tajikistan	1992	1	0
Tajikistan	1994	3	0
Tajikistan	1996	2	1
Total		6	1

Scores and results list Tajikistan's goal tally first, score column indicates score after each Fuzaylov goal.

List of international goals scored by Khakim Fuzaylov
No.	Date	Venue	Opponent	Score	Result	Competition	Ref.
1	8 May 1996	Pamir Stadium, Dushanbe, Tajikistan	Uzbekistan	1–0	4–0	1996 AFC Asian Cup qualification	

== Honours ==
=== Club ===
- Tajik League champion: 1992
- Russian Premier League bronze: 1994

=== Manager ===
- Uzbek League runners-up: 2013
