= CSKA Pamir Dushanbe =

Football club based in Dushanbe, Tajikistan

CSKA Pamir Dushanbe ЦСКА-Помир Душанбе
- Full name: CSKA Pamir Dushanbe; ЦСКА-Помир Душанбе
- Nickname: Tajik: Дастаи Футболи Помир
- Founded: 1950; 76 years ago
- Ground: Markazii Tojikiston Stadium
- Capacity: 20,000
- Manager: Juan Cortés
- League: Tajikistan Higher League
- 2025: THL, 3rd of 10
Home colours	Away colours

CSKA Pamir Dushanbe (Tajik: Клуби футболи ЦСКА-Помир Душанбе, romanized: Klubi Futboli CSKA Pomir Dushanbe) is a professional football club based in Dushanbe, Tajikistan, which plays in the Tajikistan Higher League, the country's top division. Since 1997, the club has been under the patronage of the Tajik Army, like its former rivals CSKA Dushanbe.

== History ==
Created in 1970 based on FC Energetik Dushanbe, the new Pamir Dushanbe was the only Tajik club to be promoted to the former Soviet Top League, in which the club played for the last three seasons that the league existed just prior to the dissolution of the USSR: 1989, 1990, and 1991. They made the semi-finals of the last Soviet Cup, losing to CSKA Moscow. From 1974 till 1977, the team also won all the four editions of the Afghanistan Republic Day Festival Cup held in Kabul. They also won Saur Revolution Anniversary Festival Tournament in 1979 in Afghanistan.

Due to the ongoing Tajik Civil War, the club was dissolved and its players moved to Uzbekistan. A couple of Dushanbe-based clubs were removed from the Tajik League after 1996.

Originally, at least since the World War II in Stalinabad (Soviet name for Dushanbe) existed FC Dinamo Stalinabad which in 1950 carried the name of Bolshevik. Sometime in 1956 the local football team was taken over by Tajikistani agrarian sports society of Kolhosci and later until 1969 by a sports society of power generation workers, Energetik.

The club formerly played at the Pamir Stadium, but today plays at the smaller CSKA Stadium.

=== CSKA Pamir ===
Sometime in 1997 the club was recreated under aegis of the Ministry of Defense of Tajikistan and was transformed into the Tajikistani CSKA club which was coached by newly retired former Pamir footballer Damir Kamaletdinov.

In July 2016, CSKA fired manager Rahmatullo Fuzailov, replacing him with Tokhirjon Muminov.

On 5 January 2019, Rustam Khojayev was appointed as the new manager of CSKA. On 23 June 2019, Khojayev resigned as manager. On 8 July 2019, Sergey Zhitsky was appointed as CSKA's new manager.

=== Domestic history ===
Season	League									Tajik Cup	Top goalscorer		Manager
Season	Div.	Pos.	Pl.	W	D	L	GS	GA	P	Tajik Cup	Name	League	Manager
1992	1st	1	20	16	1	3	61	15	33	Winners	(Tajikistan) Umed Alidodov	11	(Tajikistan) Sharif Nazarov
1993	1st	2	30	25	2	3	93	21	52				(Tajikistan) Sharif Nazarov
1994	1st	2	30	20	5	5	75	28	45				
1995	1st	1	28	22	1	5	81	32	67				
1998	1st	7th	22	7	9	6	31	32	30				(Tajikistan) Damir Kamaletdinov
2000	1st	4th	34	15	7	12	54	51	52				(Tajikistan) Damir Kamaletdinov
2001	1st	3rd	18	9	5	4	29	19	32				(Tajikistan) Damir Kamaletdinov
2002	1st	4th	22	12	7	3	57	25	43				(Tajikistan) Damir Kamaletdinov
2003	1st	9th	30	15	3	12	61	41	48				(Tajikistan) Damir Kamaletdinov
2004	1st	7th	36	11	4	21	55	76	37				(Tajikistan) Damir Kamaletdinov
2005	1st	7th	18	5	4	9	30	36	19				(Tajikistan) Damir Kamaletdinov (Tajikistan) Kenge Khaitov
2006	1st	8th	22	5	5	12	24	39	20				
2007	1st	7th	20	7	1	12	34	44	22				
2008	1st	11th	40	7	2	31	21	98	23				
2009	1st	8th	18	2	2	14	16	42	8	Runners-up			(Tajikistan) Abdugaffor Sattorovich Yuldashev
2010	1st	6th	32	9	10	13	35	51	37				
2011	1st	6th	40	16	4	20	65	69	52				(Tajikistan) Vladimir Utkin
2012	1st	7th	24	8	6	10	26	25	30	Quarter-final			(Tajikistan) Alier Ashurmamadov
2013	1st	9th	18	2	5	11	10	26	11				(Tajikistan) Hussein Shodiev (Tajikistan) Abdugaffor Sattorovich Yuldashev
2014	1st	8th	18	3	6	9	14	27	15		(Guinea) Alia Sylla	6	(Tajikistan) Abdugaffor Sattorovich Yuldashev
2015	1st	6	18	8	2	8	18	22	26	Semi-final	(Tajikistan) Davronjon Tukhtasunov	8	(Tajikistan) Abdugaffor Sattorovich Yuldashev
2016	1st	6	18	8	3	7	23	16	27	Last 16	(Tajikistan) Davronjon Tukhtasunov	4	
2019	1st	4	21	8	5	8	24	27	29	Quarterfinal	(Tajikistan) Shodibek Gafforov	7	(Tajikistan) Rustam Khojayev (Ukraine) Sergey Zhitsky
2020	1st	3	18	8	5	5	29	25	29	Last 16	(Tajikistan) Shodibek Gafforov (Tajikistan) Shervoni Mabatshoev	7	(Ukraine) Sergey Zhitsky
2021	1st	3	27	12	8	7	37	29	44	Quarterfinal	(Tajikistan) Fatkhullo Fatkhulloyev	9	(Tajikistan) Aliyor Ashurmamadov
2022	1st	5	22	7	4	11	30	34	25	Quarterfinal	(Tajikistan) Sharafdzhon Solehov	5	(Iran) Amin Subhoni
2023	1st	6	22	5	11	6	16	15	26	Last 16			(Tajikistan) Akhliddin Turdiev (Tajikistan) Shamsiddin Kosimov
2024	1st	4	22	11	6	5	36	21	39	Quarterfinal			

=== Continental history ===
As of match played 30 June 2022

Competition	Pld	W	D	L	GF	GA
Asian Club Championship	2	0	0	2	2	8
AFC Cup	3	0	2	1	3	4
Total	5	0	2	3	5	12

As of match played 30 June 2022

Season	Competition	Round	Club	Home	Away	Aggregate
1996–97	Asian Club Championship	First round	(Uzbekistan) Neftchi Fergana	1–4	1–4	2–8
2022	AFC Cup	Group E	(Turkmenistan) Altyn Asyr	1–1		3rd
2022	AFC Cup	Group E	(Uzbekistan) Sogdiana Jizzakh	2–3		3rd
2022	AFC Cup	Group E	(Kyrgyzstan) Neftchi Kochkor-Ata	0–0		3rd

== Honours ==
- USSR Second Division (2): 1988
- Ligai Olii Tojikiston (3): 1992, 1995,
- Tajik Cup (2): 1992
- Afghanistan Republic Day Festival Cup: (4): 1974, 1975, 1976, 1977

== Statistics ==
The following are statistics on CSKA Pamir Dushanbe's footballers' performance in USSR Top League between 1988 and 1991.

=== Most matches in USSR Top League ===
#	Name	Caps
1	(Tajikistan) Yuri Baturenko	80
1	(Tajikistan) (Russia) Andrei Manannikov	80
2	(Tajikistan) (Russia) Mukhsin Mukhamadiev	78
3	(Tajikistan) Khakim Fuzailov	75
4	(Tajikistan) (Russia) Rashid Rakhimov	74
5	(Tajikistan) Alimzhon Rafikov	61
6	(Turkmenistan) Charyar Mukhadov	54
6	(Tajikistan) Vasili Postnov	54
7	(Tajikistan) Anatoli Volovodenko	50

=== Most goals in USSR Top League ===
#	Name	Goals
1	(Tajikistan) (Russia) Mukhsin Mukhamadiev	22
2	(Tajikistan) (Russia) Rashid Rakhimov	10
2	(Turkmenistan) Charyar Mukhadov	10
3	(Tajikistan) Yuri Baturenko	5

== Current squad ==
As of 9 March 2026

Note: Flags indicate national team as defined under FIFA eligibility rules; some limited exceptions apply. Players may hold more than one non-FIFA nationality.

No.	Pos.	Nation	Player
1	GK	TJK	Safarmad Gafforov
2	DF	TJK	Izzatullo Ruziev
3	DF	TJK	Bakhtiyor Azimov
4	DF	TJK	Komroni Mirzokhon
7	DF	TJK	Jonibek Sharipov
8	MF	TJK	Saidmukhtor Azimov
9	FW	TJK	Shakhbaz Khabibov
10	DF	CMR	Gerard Bakinde
11	MF	UZB	Aʼzam Aliyev
14	MF	UZB	Islam Isakzhanov
17	DF	TJK	Mukhammadikbol Davlatov
18	FW	TJK	Abdukhalil Boronov
20	DF	TJK	Komron Ibrokhimov

No.	Pos.	Nation	Player
21	MF	TJK	Vaysiddin Safarov
22	DF	TJK	Isroil Kholov
24	DF	GHA	Alkassim Haruna
27	MF	GHA	Nasiru Moro
44	MF	TJK	Mustafa Milikshoev
54	MF	TJK	Bakhtiyor Jalilzoda
55	GK	GHA	Cobblah Prince
60	DF	TJK	Muhammad Jalolov
63	MF	TJK	Saydali Ibragimov
66	MF	TJK	Somon Sulaymonzoda
70	FW	NGR	Olaoluwa Ojetunde
77	MF	TJK	Abubakr Saidov
97	FW	BRA	Pedro Paulo

== Notable players ==
Players who had international caps for their respective countries.

Tajikistan

- (Tajikistan) Alier Ashurmamadov
- (Tajikistan) Arsen Avakov
- (Tajikistan) Yuri Baturenko
- (Tajikistan) Igor Cherevchenko
- (Tajikistan) Khakim Fuzailov
- (Tajikistan) Rahmatullo Fuzailov
- (Tajikistan) Shuhrat Mamajonov
- (Tajikistan) Andrei Manannikov
- (Tajikistan) Vazgen Manasyan
- (Tajikistan) (Commonwealth of Independent States) (Russia) Sergey Mandreko
- (Tajikistan) (Russia) Mukhsin Mukhamadiev
- (Tajikistan) Tokhirjon Muminov
- (Tajikistan) Vasili Postnov
- (Tajikistan) (Russia) Rashid Rakhimov
- (Tajikistan) Valeri Sarychev
- (Tajikistan) (Soviet Union) Oleg Shirinbekov
- (Tajikistan) Georgi Takhokhov
- (Tajikistan) Anatoli Volovodenko
- (Soviet Union) Oleksiy Cherednyk
- (Soviet Union) Edgar Gess

Former USSR countries

- (Turkmenistan) Charyar Mukhadov
- (Turkmenistan) Röwşen Muhadow
- (Uzbekistan) Azamat Abduraimov
- (Uzbekistan) Ravshan Bozorov
- (Uzbekistan) Rustam Zabirov

Africa

- (Zambia) Wisdom Mumba Chansa
- (Zambia) Derby Makinka
- (Zambia) Pearson Mwanza

== Managers ==
- (Soviet Union) Nikolay Potapov (1964)
- (Soviet Union) Andrei Zazroyev (1964–66)
- (Soviet Union) Vladimir Alyakrinskii (1967–68)
- (Soviet Union) Ivan Vasilevich (1968–69)
- (Azerbaijan) Ahmad Alaskarov (1972)
- (Hungary) (Tajikistan) Ishtvan Sekech (1973–78)
- (Soviet Union) Vladimir Gulyamhaydarov (1982–83)
- (Soviet Union) Yuri Semin (1983–85)
- (Tajikistan) Sharif Nazarov (1986–88), (1992–??)
- (Tajikistan) Damir Kamaletdinov (1998–05)
- (Tajikistan) Makhmadjon Khabibulloev (2012–2015)
- (Tajikistan) Rahmatullo Fuzailov (2016)
- (Tajikistan) Tokhirjon Muminov (2016)
- (Tajikistan) Abdugaffor Yuldashev (2017)
- (Tajikistan) Rustam Khojayev (2018–2019)
- (Ukraine) Serhiy Zhytskyi (2019–2021)
- (Iran) Amin Sobhani (2022–)
