= 1996 Tajik League =

Tajik League
- Season: 1996
- Champions: Dynamo Dushanbe
- Matches: 240
- Goals: 909 (3.79 per match)
- Top goalscorer: Mukhiddin Izzatulloev (35)

Tajik League is the top division of the Tajikistan Football Federation, it was created in 1992. These are the statistics of the Tajik League in the 1996 season.

== Table ==
Pos	Team	Pld	W	D	L	GF	GA	GD	Pts
1	Dynamo Dushanbe (C)	30	23	4	3	93	24	+69	73
2	Sitora Dushanbe	30	22	5	3	94	21	+73	71
3	Khujand	30	20	4	6	77	27	+50	64
4	Ravshan Kulob	30	20	3	7	87	36	+51	63
5	Regar-TadAZ	30	19	2	9	67	42	+25	59
6	Vakhsh Kurgan-Tyube	30	18	2	10	77	37	+40	56
7	Bofanda Dushanbe	30	17	3	10	62	41	+21	54
8	Khosilot Farkhor	30	17	1	12	64	56	+8	52
9	Khulbuk Vose	30	13	2	15	60	55	+5	41
10	Saddam Fayzali	30	10	6	14	52	64	−12	36
11	CSKA Dushanbe	30	9	4	17	43	65	−22	31
12	Pakhtakor Dushanbe	30	9	1	20	31	92	−61	28
13	Bokhtar	30	6	4	20	39	76	−37	22
14	Shodmon Ghissar	30	6	3	21	25	75	−50	21
15	Pakhtakor Proletarsk	30	5	0	25	15	88	−73	15
16	Dzhavonon (R)	30	2	2	26	23	105	−82	8

Updated to match(es) played on 8 October 2015. Source: RSSF
Rules for classification: 1) points; 2) goal difference; 3) number of goals scored.
(C) Champions; (R) Relegated
