= FC Nosta Novotroitsk =

Russian football club

- Full name: FC Nosta Novotroitsk
- Founded: 1991; 35 years ago
- Ground: Metallurg Stadium, Novotroitsk
- Capacity: 6,000
- Chairman: Yuri Kalyakin
- Manager: Aleksandr Rudenko
- League: Russian Second League, Division B, Group 4
- 2026: 10th
- Website: www.fc-nosta.ru
Home colours	Away colours

FC Nosta Novotroitsk is a Russian association football club based in Novotroitsk, Orenburg Oblast. The club finished 16th in the Russian First Division in 2009 and was relegated to the Russian Second Division. In early 2010 it was announced that the club is dissolved due to lack of financing. However, in February 2010, the new sponsorship was arranged and the club continued playing.

== Current squad ==
As of 14 September 2026, according to the official Second League website.

Note: Flags indicate national team as defined under FIFA eligibility rules; some limited exceptions apply. Players may hold more than one non-FIFA nationality.

No.	Pos.	Nation	Player
4	MF	RUS	Yaroslav Volkov
5	DF	RUS	Stanislav Irshev
6	MF	RUS	Ilya Gushchin
7	FW	RUS	Aykhan Bakhysh-Zade
8	FW	RUS	Arseny Vayner
9	MF	RUS	Sergey Lesovsky
10	MF	RUS	Dmitry Chamzhayev
11	MF	RUS	Ilya Kamyshev
12	FW	RUS	Artur Ananyan
13	FW	RUS	Danila Boyko
14	DF	RUS	Yegor Koltsov
15	DF	RUS	Valery Fyodorov

No.	Pos.	Nation	Player
16	GK	RUS	Nikolay Tyulenev
17	FW	RUS	Vladislav Galkin
19	MF	RUS	Ilya Popov
20	DF	RUS	Artemy Bludov
21	FW	RUS	Yegor Borisov
22	MF	RUS	Denis Potashov
23	DF	RUS	Anton Permyakov
27	MF	RUS	Amir Akhmedzhanov
28	DF	RUS	Vadim Ssorin
29	DF	RUS	Vladislav Podyanov
31	DF	RUS	Yegor Pigayev
33	GK	RUS	Artur Sivolapov

== Notable players ==
Had international caps for their respective countries. Players whose name is listed in bold represented their countries while playing for Nosta.

USSR/Russia

- (Russia) (Ukraine) Aleksei Bakharev
- (Russia) Mingiyan Beveyev
- (Russia) Denis Boyarintsev

Former USSR countries

- (Azerbaijan) **Emin Agaev**
- (Tajikistan) Rahmatullo Fuzailov
- (Moldova) Vladislav Lungu
- (Belarus) **Dmitry Molosh**
- (Lithuania) **Mantas Savėnas**
- (Kazakhstan) Mikhail Rozhkov
- (Uzbekistan) Oleg Sinelobov
- (Tajikistan) Anatoli Volovodenko
