= 1992 Tajik League =

Tajik League
- Season: 1992
- Champions: Pamir Dushanbe; 1st Tajik League title
- Matches: 110
- Goals: 267 (2.43 per match)
- Top goalscorer: Umed Alidodov (11)

The 1992 Tajik League was the inaugural season of the Tajik League, the top Tajik league for association football clubs, following the dissolution of the Soviet Union.

Most of the 12 teams which contested the league had previously played in the Soviet Second League and Soviet Second League B, the third and fourth tiers of the football pyramid in the Soviet Union except Pamir Dushanbe (playing in the Soviet Top League). The format was altered in response to the Tajikistani Civil War. Pamir Dushanbe won the title for the first time.

== Background ==
Locations of teams in the 1992 Tajikistan Higher League

Following the Revolutions of 1989, the Soviet Union was dissolved and ceased to exist on 26 December 1991. Football clubs in Tajikistan had previously competed in the Soviet football pyramid. Most teams which would compete in the inaugural Tajik League had contested the lower divisions but Pamir Dushanbe were playing at the highest level, the Soviet Top League. A Tajik championship was also played at a level below the Soviet Union-wide divisions.

== Format ==
The competition was played as a double round robin among the 12 teams. Every team would play each other twice – once at home and once away – for a total of 22 matches. Two points were awarded for a win, one for a draw and none for a loss.

Originally, the tournament was envisioned to be played in an autumn–spring season. However, this was changed following the outbreak of the Tajikistani Civil War in May 1992.

Following the withdrawal of Khosilot Farkhor and Ravshan Kulob for political reasons, the competition continued as if they hadn't left. Their records for the opening 10 matches were allowed to stand and the remaining teams played their remaining fixtures for a total of 20 matches.

== Table ==
Pos	Team	Pld	W	D	L	GF	GA	GD	Pts
1	Pamir Dushanbe (C)	20	16	1	3	61	15	+46	33
2	Regar-TadAZ	20	11	4	5	27	11	+16	26
3	Vakhsh	20	11	2	7	36	23	+13	24
4	Khujand	20	10	4	6	14	16	−2	24
5	Pakhtakor Proletarsk	20	11	1	8	23	30	−7	23
6	Istaravshan	20	10	3	7	27	35	−8	23
7	Shodmon Ghissar	20	8	4	8	18	16	+2	20
8	Sokhibkor Dushanbe	20	7	4	9	19	19	0	18
9	Saikhun Khodjent	20	6	5	9	21	27	−6	17
10	Sitora Dushanbe	20	3	3	14	11	31	−20	9
11	Khosilot Farkhor	10	1	0	9	6	24	−18	2 (Note: Khosilot and Ravshan withdrew because of political reasons)
12	Ravshan Kulob	10	0	1	9	4	20	−16	1

Rules for classification: 1) points; 2) goal difference; 3) number of goals scored.
(C) Champions
