= Sitora Dushanbe =

- Full name: Sitora Dushanbe
- Founded: 1990; 36 years ago
- Dissolved: 1997; 29 years ago
- Ground: Central Republican Stadium
- Capacity: 20,000
- League: Tajik League
- 1997: 7th
| Home colours | Away colours |

Sitora Dushanbe (Tajik: Dastai Futboli Sitora) was a football club based in Dushanbe, Tajikistan between 1990 and 1997.

== History ==
Sitora Dushanbe were founded in 1990, and went on to win the Tajik League twice, in 1993 and 1994. At the end of the 1997 season, Sitora ceased to exist due to financial problems.

=== Domestic history ===
| Season | League | | | | | | | | | Tajik Cup | Top goalscorer | | Manager |
| Season | Div. | Pos. | Pl. | W | D | L | GS | GA | P | Tajik Cup | Name | League | Manager |
|---|---|---|---|---|---|---|---|---|---|---|---|---|---|
| 1992 | 1st | 10 | 20 | 3 | 3 | 14 | 11 | 31 | 12 | | | | |
| 1993 | 1st | 1 | 30 | 27 | 1 | 2 | 66 | 22 | 55 | Winner | | | |
| 1994 | 1st | 1 | 30 | 21 | 5 | 4 | 51 | 17 | 47 | | | | |
| 1995 | 1st | 3 | 28 | 17 | 1 | 10 | 57 | 34 | 52 | | | | |
| 1996 | 1st | 2 | 30 | 22 | 5 | 3 | 94 | 21 | 71 | | | | |
| 1997 | 1st | 7 | 24 | 10 | 7 | 7 | 43 | 38 | 37 | | | | |

=== Continental history ===
| Season | Competition | Round | Club | Home | Away | Aggregate |
|---|---|---|---|---|---|---|
| 1994–95 | Asian Cup Winners' Cup | Preliminary round | (Uzbekistan) Neftchi Fargʻona | 0–3 | | |
| 1994–95 | Asian Cup Winners' Cup | Preliminary round | (Turkmenistan) Köpetdag Aşgabat | 1–7 | | |
| 1994–95 | Asian Cup Winners' Cup | Preliminary round | (Kazakhstan) Ansat Pavlodar | 0–4 | | |
| 1994–95 | Asian Cup Winners' Cup | Preliminary round | (Kyrgyzstan) Alga Bishkek | 3–1 | | |

== Honours ==
- Tajik League (2): 1993, 1994.
- Tajik Cup (1): 1993
