= Khosilot Farkhor =

Hosilot Farkhor
- Full name: Football Club Hosilot Farkhor
- Ground: Central Stadium; Farkhor, Tajikistan
- Chairman: Ibrokhim Abdulloev
- Manager: Amin Subhoni
- League: Tajikistan Higher League
- 2025: Tajikistan Higher League, 9th of 12

Hosilot Farkhor（Tajik: Клуби футболи «Ҳосилот» Фархор) is a professional football club from Farkhor, Tajikistan. The team name Hosilot (Ҳосилот) means "Harvest" in Tajik.

== Name history ==
- 1991–1994: Hosilot Farkhor
- 1995–1997: FC Farkhor
- 2003: SKA-Khatlon Farkhor
- 2004–2005: FC Farkhor
- 2010–present: Hosilot Farkhor

== Domestic record ==
Season	League									Tajik Cup	Top goalscorer		Manager
Season	Div.	Pos.	Pl.	W	D	L	GS	GA	P	Tajik Cup	Name	League	Manager
1992^{1}	1st	11	10	1	0	9	6	24	2				
1993	1st	8	30	14	6	10	47	47	34				
1994	1st	13	30	7	4	19	34	67	18				
1995	1st	13	28	9	2	17	43	83	29				
1996	1st	8	30	17	1	12	64	56	52				
1997	1st	8	24	7	3	14	38	76	24				
2003	1st	15	30	4	0	26	21	135	12				
2012	1st	11	24	4	2	18	18	64	14	Quarter-final			
2016	1st	2nd	18	11	4	3	40	16	37	Runners-up	Kamil Saidov	10	
2017	1st	8	21	4	3	14	17	55	15	Quarter-final	Agbley Jones; Muhammadjoni Hasan	3	
2018	2nd												
2019	2nd												
2020	2nd	7	22	9	3	10	38	39	30	Preliminary round			
2021	2nd	3	22	15	4	3	43	21	49	Preliminary round			
2022	2nd												
2023	1st	8	22	6	7	9	17	22	25	Quarter-final			
2024	1st	8	22	5	9	8	27	26	24	Last 16			Alisher Tukhtaev
2025	1st	9	22	6	6	10	27	38	24				

- Khosilot withdrew because of political reasons

== Continental record ==
Season	Competition	Round	Club	Home	Away	Aggregate
2017	AFC Cup	Preliminary round	(Afghanistan) Shaheen Asmayee	0–0	1–0	1–0
2017	AFC Cup	Play-off	(Kyrgyzstan) Dordoi Bishkek	1–1	0–1	1–2

== Honours ==
- Tajik Supercup
  - Champions (1): 2017

== Current squad ==
As of 10 September 2026

Note: Flags indicate national team as defined under FIFA eligibility rules; some limited exceptions apply. Players may hold more than one non-FIFA nationality.

No.	Pos.	Nation	Player
1	GK	TJK	Daler Azizov
3	MF	CMR	Jean Gatten
4	FW	CMR	Rudolph Ngombé
5	DF	TJK	Barakatullo Nigmatullozoda
6	MF	GHA	Anani Kwasi
7	FW	TJK	Sharafjon Solekhov
8	MF	TJK	Faridun Sharipov
9	FW	TJK	Sheriddin Boboev
10	FW	GHA	Joseph Akomadi
11	DF	TJK	Shahruh Sangov
14	DF	TJK	Muhammadrasul Litfullaev

No.	Pos.	Nation	Player
15	FW	TJK	Ekhson Kurbonov
16	GK	TJK	Muhammadrahim Rakhmonov
17	FW	TJK	Nazrullo Ashuralizoda
21	DF	TJK	Furkon Rahimzoda
24	DF	GHA	Bortey Nii Gyashi
45	DF	GHA	Osuman Kassim
55	DF	TJK	Furkon Rahimzoda
77	MF	TJK	Shukhrat Elmurodov
80	MF	TJK	Salokhiddin Irgashev
88	GK	EST	Alexey Matrosov
