= CSKA Dushanbe =

Defunct association football club in Tajikistan

- Full name: CSKA Dushanbe
- Ground: Pamir Stadium; Dushanbe
- Capacity: 20,000
- Chairman: Sherali Mirzo
- Manager: Sergey Zhitsky
- League: Tajik League

CSKA Dushanbe was a football club in Tajikistan. The club last appeared in the top division of the country, the Tajik League in 2006. This was the central army club in Tajikistan, until it was merged into CSKA Pamir Dushanbe.

== History ==
=== Domestic history ===
Season	League									Tajik Cup	Top goalscorer		Manager
Season	Div.	Pos.	Pl.	W	D	L	GS	GA	P	Tajik Cup	Name	League	Manager
1995	1st	11th	28	10	4	14	41	48	34				
1996	1st	11th	30	9	4	17	43	65	31				
2005	1st	4th	18	9	1	8	31	23	28				
2006	1st	5th	22	11	2	9	38	31	35				
