= FC Khatlon =

Vakhsh Bokhtar
- Full name: Football Club Vakhsh Bokhtar
- Nickname: Tajik: ФК Вахш Қӯрғонтеппа
- Founded: 1960; 66 years ago February 2018, 6; 8 years ago (renamed FC Khatlon)
- Ground: Bokhtar Markazii Stadium; Bokhtar, Tajikistan
- Capacity: 10,000
- Manager: Zarif Usmonov
- League: Tajikistan Higher League
- 2025: THL, 2nd of 10
Home colours	Away colours

Vakhsh Bokhtar (Tajik: Вахш Бохтар), formerly known as Khatlon Bokhtar, is a professional football club based in Bokhtar, Tajikistan. They currently play in the top division of the country.

== History ==
FC Vakhsh was founded in 1960. In Soviet times was the farm club of the core team of the Tajik SSR – Dushanbe based CSKA Pomir Dushanbe. From 1966 to 1984 the team played under the name of Pakhtakor. "Vakhsh" first became a champion of Tajikistan in 1961 and four years later the club won the Cup for the first time in Tajikistan.

Footballers from Qurghonteppa for the first time took part in the USSR Championship in 1966, playing in the Central Asian zone of B League, when finished 16th out of 19 teams. Although from the following season the team improved their performance, in 1967 17th place (among 22 teams), in 1968 10th (out of 22), 1969 – 6th (out of 24) and in 1970 5th place (out of 18). Unfortunately, the further advancement of the team was stopped due to reorganization of the Soviet football structure in 1971.

In 1978 Pakhtakor became champion of the Tajik SSR and won a ticket to the soviet second league. From 1978 to 1984 Pakhtakor played in the second league. Again, the team was just beginning to acquire confidence as a solution of the Sports Committee of the Soviet Union removed from the rally. Since 1986, Qurghonteppa was re-introduced in the second league. To defend the honor of the city took "Vakhsh – champion of the republic in 1985. This team also goes through the gradual conquest of positions. From 16th place in 1986, Vakhsh up to 4th place in 1989, after which the club has to play in the buffer zone, though not as a team, which finished in fourth place, but as the representative of Tajikistan. In those days, Vakhsh's best footballers always ended up in Tajikistan's best team, CSKA Pomir Dushanbe. The most notable of these are Mukhsin Mukhamadiev, Khakim Fuzailov, Rustam Zabirov, Sergei Mandreko, Alimzhon Rafikov, Alexander Asimov and Vladimir Dolganov.

Since 1992, Vakhsh plays in the Tajik League. In the same year "Vakhsh" took third place. The club has achieved great success in the 1997 season, having won Tajik Cup, and qualified for the first time to participate in AFC Cup Winners Cup. Also in 1997, the year Vakhsh became the champion of Tajikistan. Striker Rustam Usmanov scoring 21 goals was named the best scorer of the national championship. In 2002, Vakhsh played in the Tajik Cup final and in 2003 won the Tajik Cup. In 2004, Vakhsh took second place and was awarded the silver medals of the championship in Tajikistan. In 2005, Vakhsh once again reached the final of Tajik Cup, losing the deciding match Regar-TadAZ Tursunzoda in a penalty shootout. Although in the same year, Vakhsh became champions of Tajik League, a 17-year-old striker by the name of Akhtam Khamrakulov was named best scorer of the championship with 12 goals.

Vakhsh reached her peak of success in the international arena in 2006, when the team reached the final of AFC President's Cup losing to eventual champions Dordoi-Dynamo Naryn 2–1 in the extra time.

In February 2018, Vakhsh was taken over by the local government of Bokhtar (previously known as Qurghonteppa) due to financial difficulties, and was renamed FC Khatlon.

=== Domestic history ===
Season	League									Tajik Cup	Top goalscorer		Manager
Season	Div.	Pos.	Pl.	W	D	L	GS	GA	P	Tajik Cup	Name	League	Manager
1992	1st	3rd	20	11	2	7	36	23	24				
1995	1st	10th	28	11	4	13	38	43	37				
1996	1st	10th	30	18	2	10	77	37	56				
1997	1st	1st	24	19	2	3	69	15	59	Winners			
1998	1st	8th	22	8	3	11	30	28	27				
1999	1st	12th	22	1	0	21	6	82	3				
2000	1st	7th	34	10	3	21	57	83	33				
2001	1st	7th	18	4	3	11	16	26	15				
2002	1st	6th	22	12	1	9	41	23	37	Runners-up			
2003	1st	4th	30	21	5	4	83	22	68	Winners			
2004	1st	2nd	36	26	7	3	89	24	85		(Tajikistan) Nazir Rizomov	32	
2005	1st	1st	18	15	2	1	41	12	47	Runners-up	(Tajikistan) Akhtam Khamrakulov (Tajikistan) Nazir Rizomov	12	
2006	1st	3rd	22	15	2	5	41	18	47		(Tajikistan) Fozil Sattorov	20	
2007	1st	3rd	20	11	4	5	26	16	37				
2008	1st	4th	40	21	3	16	59	46	66				
2009	1st	1st	18	15	1	2	44	15	46	Quarterfinal	(Tajikistan) Numonjon Hakimov	15	
2010	1st	3rd	32	16	8	8	42	27	56				
2011	1st	8th	40	15	5	20	43	51	50				
2012	1st	6th	24	9	4	11	31	24	31	Round of 16			
2013	1st	7th	18	4	4	10	11	17	16	Semifinal			
2014	1st	9th	18	4	2	12	12	32	14				
2015	1st	8th	18	3	4	11	11	34	13	Quarterfinal	(Tajikistan) Muhammadjon Hassan	4	
2016	1st	8th	18	5	3	10	21	39	18	Last 16	(Tajikistan) Akhtam Khamrakulov	5	
2017	1st	6th	21	5	7	9	17	28	22	Quarterfinal	(Tajikistan) Umardzhon Sharipov (Tajikistan) Holmurod Nazarov	3	
2018	1st	5th	21	7	4	10	27	29	25	Quarterfinal			
2019	1st	7th	21	6	6	9	26	28	24	Quarterfinal	(Tajikistan) Parviz Akhunov	5	
2020	1st	5th	18	6	8	4	27	24	26	Runners-up	(Tajikistan) Parviz Baki-Akhunov	7	(Tajikistan) Asliddin Khabibullaev
2021	1st	6th	27	10	6	11	30	33	36	Quarterfinal	(Tajikistan) Nuriddin Khamrokulov	7	(Tajikistan) Rustam Khojayev
2022	1st	4th	22	9	7	6	23	17	34	Semi Final	(Tajikistan) Nuriddin Khamrokulov	7	(Tajikistan) Asliddin Khabibullaev
2023	1st	10th	22	5	2	15	12	38	17	Semi Final			(Tajikistan) Asliddin Khabibullaev
2024	1st	5th	22	11	2	9	26	21	35	Quarter Final			(Tajikistan) Nuriddin Sardorboev
2025	1st	2nd	22	12	9	1	33	18	45	Semi Final	(Ukraine) Dmytro Bilonoh	8	(Tajikistan) Zarif Usmonov

=== Continental history ===
As of match played 24 September 2010

Competition	Pld	W	D	L	GF	GA
Asian Cup Winners' Cup	2	0	0	2	2	4
Asian Club Championship	2	0	0	2	0	6
AFC President's Cup	9	6	0	3	20	9
Total	13	6	0	7	22	19

Season	Competition	Round	Club	Home	Away	Aggregate
1997–98	Asian Cup Winners' Cup	First round	(Kazakhstan) Kairat	2–1	0–3	2–4
1998–99	Asian Club Championship	First round	(Uzbekistan) Neftchi Fergana	w/o		
1998–99	Asian Club Championship	Second round	(Turkmenistan) Köpetdag Aşgabat	0–1	0–5	0–6
2006	AFC President's Cup	Group B	(Kyrgyzstan) Dordoi-Dynamo Naryn	3–0		1st
2006	AFC President's Cup	Group B	(Nepal) Manang Marshyangdi	1–3		1st
2006	AFC President's Cup	Group B	(Sri Lanka) Ratnam	2–0		1st
2006	AFC President's Cup	Semi-final	(Taiwan) Tatung	3–1		
2006	AFC President's Cup	Final	(Kyrgyzstan) Dordoi-Dynamo Naryn	1–2 (a.e.t.)		
2010	AFC President's Cup	Group B	(Cambodia) Nagaworld	3–0		1st
2010	AFC President's Cup	Group B	(Pakistan) KRL	1–0		1st
2010	AFC President's Cup	Group B	(Sri Lanka) Renown SC	6–0		1st
2010	AFC President's Cup	Semi-final	(Myanmar) Yadanarbon	0–2		

== Honours ==
- SSR Tajik League
  - Champions (2): 1961, 1985
- SSR Tajikistan Cup
  - Winners (1): 1965
- Tajik League
  - Champions (3): 1997, 2005, 2009
- Tajik Cup
  - Winners (2): 1997, 2003

== Current squad ==
As of 9 March 2026

Note: Flags indicate national team as defined under FIFA eligibility rules; some limited exceptions apply. Players may hold more than one non-FIFA nationality.

No.	Pos.	Nation	Player
1	GK	TJK	Mukhammad Abdulkhadov
2	DF	TJK	Siyovush Asrorov
3	DF	CMR	Tony Bikatal
4	DF	TJK	Mekhrojiddin Rozikov
7	FW	TJK	Sunatullo Ismoilov
8	MF	TJK	Ehson Boboev
9	MF	UKR	Mykyta Tatarkov
10	MF	GHA	Benjamin Amponsah
13	DF	UKR	Serhiy Yavorskyi
14	DF	TJK	Bekmurod Khaitov
16	GK	UKR	Dmytro Fastov
18	MF	TJK	Fatkhullo Fatkhulloyev
19	DF	TJK	Akhtam Nazarov

No.	Pos.	Nation	Player
20	MF	TJK	Parviz Bobonazarov
23	DF	TJK	Muhammadjon Naskov
30	FW	TJK	Nuriddin Khamrokulov
31	FW	TJK	Bekhruz Khujaev
33	DF	TJK	Ozodbek Tanjikholov
63	MF	TJK	Mekhrojiddin Ibronov
68	MF	TJK	Shakhzod Davlatov
73	DF	TJK	Alisher Barotov
77	DF	TJK	Akbarjon Dzhabarov
81	MF	TJK	Tokhirjon Tagoyzoda
88	FW	UKR	Kostyantyn Cherniy
97	MF	RUS	Sergei Tskanyan
