= Regar-TadAZ Tursunzoda =

- Full name: Football Club Regar-TadAZ TALCO Tursunzade
- Founded: 1975; 51 years ago
- Ground: TALCO Arena; Tursunzoda, Tajikistan
- Capacity: 10,000
- Manager: Alisher Tukhtaev
- League: Tajikistan Higher League
- 2025: Tajikistan Higher League, 7th of 10
- Website: regartadaz-fc.tj
Home colours	Away colours

Regar-TadAZ Tursunzoda (Tajik: Регар-ТадАЗ Турсунзода клуби футболи) is a Tajik professional football club based in Tursunzoda.

== History ==
Regar-TadAZ Tursunzoda was formed in 1975 as "Metallurg", and was made up of workers from the TALCO plant. In December 2013 Regar-TadAZ was on the brink of bankruptcy, after their main sponsor TALCO suffered financial problems. In August 2017 Makhmadjon Khabibulloev returned to the club as manager. On 20 October 2024, Regar-TadAZ won the Tajik Cup with a 2–1 win over FK Khujand in the final at Istaravshan Sports Complex. Regar-TadAZ has received the right to represent Tajikistan in the 2025–26 AFC Champions League Two. On May 14, 2025, Alisher Tukhtaev was appointed manager of Regar-TadAZ. In the playoff match of the 2025–26 AFC Champions League Two, Regar-TadAZ lost to Turkmen Ahal FK (1:2). Regar-TadAZ continued its performance in the 2025–26 AFC Challenge League. On September 14, the Tajikistan Cup final took place at the 20 Years of Independence Stadium. Regar-TadAZ crushed local team Eskhata Khujand by 5-0 to win the national cup trophy for the eighth time in its history.

=== Domestic history ===
Season	League									Tajik Cup	Top goalscorer		Manager
Season	Div.	Pos.	Pl.	W	D	L	GS	GA	P	Tajik Cup	Name	League	Manager
1992	1st	2	20	11	4	5	27	11	26	Runner-up			
1993	1st	6	30	14	8	8	62	34	36				
1994	1st	7	30	14	7	9	69	40	35	Semi-finals			
1995	1st	6	28	13	3	12	44	40	42	Runner-up			
1996	1st	5	30	19	2	9	67	42	59				
1997	1st	5	24	13	4	7	50	32	43				
1998	1st	9	22	6	7	9	24	29	25				
1999	1st	4	22	14	3	5	52	14	45	Runner-up			
2000	1st	2	34	23	8	3	83	23	77	Winner	(Tajikistan) Pirmurod Burkhanov	20	
2001	1st	1	18	16	2	0	58	9	50	Winner	(Tajikistan) Pirmurod Burkhanov	19	(Tajikistan) M.Khabibulloev
2002	1st	1	22	19	1	2	75	28	58				(Tajikistan) M.Khabibulloev
2003	1st	1	30	26	3	1	124	18	81		(Tajikistan) Osimjon Boboyev	38	(Tajikistan) M.Khabibulloev
2004	1st	1	36	26	8	2	111	32	86		(Tajikistan) Sukhrob Khamidov	33	(Tajikistan) M.Khabibulloev
2005	1st	2	18	13	3	2	46	9	42	Winner	(Tajikistan) Sukhrob Khamidov	11	(Tajikistan) M.Khabibulloev
2006	1st	1	22	18	1	3	65	19	55	Winner			(Tajikistan) M.Khabibulloev
2007	1st	1	20	18	1	1	61	14	55		(Uzbekistan) Abbos Abdulloyev	17	(Tajikistan) M.Khabibulloev
2008	1st	1	40	32	5	3	129	36	101				(Tajikistan) M.Khabibulloev
2009	1st	2	18	13	2	3	47	14	41	Semi-final	(Tajikistan) Khurshed Makhmudov	10	(Tajikistan) M.Khabibulloev
2010	1st	2	32	22	5	5	81	24	71				(Tajikistan) M.Khabibulloev
2011	1st	2	40	30	5	5	108	29	95	Winner			(Tajikistan) M.Khabibulloev
2012	1st	2	24	19	4	1	77	16	61	Winner	(Tajikistan) Kamil Saidov	20	(Tajikistan) M.Khabibulloev
2013	1st	4	18	10	3	5	26	18	33	Runner-up			(Tajikistan) M.Khabibulloev
2014	1st	6	18	5	5	8	25	27	20	Runner-up	(Tajikistan) Firuz Rakhmatov	9	
2015	1st	4	18	9	6	3	31	14	33	Runner-up	(Tajikistan) Kamil Saidov	9	(Tajikistan) Alisher Hakberdiev
2016	1st	3	18	10	2	6	36	23	32	Quarter-final	(Tajikistan) Romish Jalilov	10	
2017	1st	4	21	6	6	9	22	23	24	First round	(Tajikistan) Komron Tursunov	8	
2018	1st	4	21	8	4	9	27	26	28	Runner-up	(Tajikistan) Navruz Rustamov	9	
2019	1st	3	21	8	6	7	31	30	30	Runner-up	(Tajikistan) Sherzod Makhamadiev	9	
2020	1st	10	18	3	3	11	19	43	12	Semifinal	(Tajikistan) Nozim Babadjanov	5	(Tajikistan) Uktam Sattorov
2021	2nd	1	22	18	4	0	70	22	58	Last 16			
2022	1st	8	22	7	4	11	23	26	25	?	(Tajikistan) Fatkhullo Fatkhulloyev	6	(Tajikistan) Hikmat Fuzailov (Tajikistan) Aliyor Ashurmamadov
2023	1st	9	22	5	9	8	21	30	24	?	(Tajikistan) Nuriddin Khamrokulov	3	(Tajikistan) Aliyor Ashurmamadov (Tajikistan) Rakhmatullo Fuzaylov
2024	1st	7	22	9	6	7	21	15	33	Winner	(Ghana) Kwadwo Frimpong	6	(Tajikistan) Zayniddin Rakhimov
2025	1st	7	22	8	6	8	25	24	30	Winner	(Ghana) Kwadwo Frimpong	8	(Tajikistan) Tokhirjon Muminov (Tajikistan) Alisher Tukhtaev

=== Continental history ===
Season	Competition	Round	Club	Home	Away	Aggregate
2000–01	Asian Cup Winners' Cup	First round – West Asia	(Kazakhstan) SOPFK Kairat Almaty	1–1	0–2	1–3
2001–02	Asian Cup Winners' Cup	First round – West Asia	(Turkmenistan) Nisa Aşgabat	4–1	0–1	4–2
2001–02	Asian Cup Winners' Cup	Second round – West Asia	(Uzbekistan) Pakhtakor Tashkent	3–1	2–2	5–3
2001–02	Asian Cup Winners' Cup	Quarter-finals – West Asia	(Saudi Arabia) Al-Hilal FC	0–2	0–3	0–5
2005	AFC President's Cup	Group A	(Bhutan) Transport United	6–1		1st
2005	AFC President's Cup	Group A	(Chinese Taipei) Taipower FC	3–0		1st
2005	AFC President's Cup	Group A	(Nepal) Three Star Club	0–0		1st
2005	AFC President's Cup	Semi-finals	(Sri Lanka) Blue Star SC	6–0		
2005	AFC President's Cup	Final	(Kyrgyzstan) Dordoi-Dynamo	3–0		
2007	AFC President's Cup	Group A	(Bhutan) Transport United	13–0		1st
2007	AFC President's Cup	Group A	Pakistan Army	2–1		1st
2007	AFC President's Cup	Group A	(Sri Lanka) Ratnam Sports Club	1–0		1st
2007	AFC President's Cup	Semi-finals	(Nepal) Mahendra Police Club	1–2		
2008	AFC President's Cup	Group A	(Pakistan) WAPDA	2–1		1st
2008	AFC President's Cup	Group A	(Bangladesh) Abahani Limited	2–1		1st
2008	AFC President's Cup	Group A	(Nepal) Mahendra Police Club	2–2		1st
2008	AFC President's Cup	Semi-finals	(Turkmenistan) Aşgabat	4–3 (a.e.t.)		
2008	AFC President's Cup	Final	(Kyrgyzstan) Dordoi-Dynamo	1–1 (4–3 pen)		
2009	AFC President's Cup	Group A	(Pakistan) WAPDA	0–0		1st
2009	AFC President's Cup	Group A	(Chinese Taipei) Taipower FC	3–1		1st
2009	AFC President's Cup	Group A	(Nepal) Mahendra Police Club	2–2		1st
2009	AFC President's Cup	Semi-finals	(Pakistan) WAPDA	4–3 (a.e.t.)		
2009	AFC President's Cup	Final	(Kyrgyzstan) Dordoi-Dynamo	2–0		
2013	AFC Cup	Group A	Al-Kuwait	1–3	0–5	4th
2013	AFC Cup	Group A	(Bahrain) Al-Riffa	0–3	1–1	4th
2013	AFC Cup	Group A	(Lebanon) Safa	2–3	1–1	4th
2025–26	AFC Challenge League	Group C	(Kyrgyzstan) Muras United	0–0		4th
2025–26	AFC Challenge League	Group C	(Kuwait) Al-Arabi	1–2		4th
2025–26	AFC Challenge League	Group C	(Lebanon) Safa	1–2		4th
2026–27	AFC Challenge League	Preliminary stage	(Maldives) Maziya	3–0		
2026–27	AFC Challenge League	Group C	(India) Goa	2–1		4th
2026–27	AFC Challenge League	Group C	(Kuwait) Al-Qadsia	0–1		4th
2026–27	AFC Challenge League	Group C	(Bangladesh) Fortis	1–3		4th

== Honours ==
=== Domestic ===
- Ligai Olii Tojikiston
  - Championship (7): 2001, 2002, 2003, 2004, 2006, 2007, 2008
- Tajikistan Cup
  - Winners (8): 2000–01, 2001–02, 2005, 2006, 2011, 2012, 2024, 2025
- Tajikistan Football Federation Cup
  - Winners (2): 2012, 2016
- Tajik Supercup
  - Winners (1): 2026

=== Continental ===
- AFC President's Cup / AFC Challenge League
  - Winners (3): 2005, 2008, 2009

== Current squad ==
As of 10 September 2026

Note: Flags indicate national team as defined under FIFA eligibility rules; some limited exceptions apply. Players may hold more than one non-FIFA nationality.

No.	Pos.	Nation	Player
1	GK	TJK	Shakhobiddin Makhmudzoda
2	DF	TJK	Abdusmad Melikmurodov
4	DF	TJK	Bakhtior Kalandarov
6	MF	CMR	Edimo Kingue
7	MF	TJK	Azizbek Haitov
9	FW	TJK	Amirdzhon Safarov
11	MF	TJK	Faridun Davlatov
12	DF	GHA	Prince Arthur
13	MF	TJK	Nozim Babadjanov
18	MF	TJK	Abdullo Sharipov
20	MF	TJK	Ozodbek Pandzhiev

No.	Pos.	Nation	Player
21	FW	TJK	Dilovarshoh Ganiev
27	DF	TJK	Daler Imomnazarov
29	DF	CMR	Ndongo Foé
30	MF	CMR	Martin Ako Assomo
38	GK	CMR	Takam Takam
44	DF	CMR	Joseph Feumba
70	MF	TJK	Sherzod Makhamadiev
74	DF	TJK	Sorbon Giyosov
88	MF	TJK	Abdurahmon Nazimov
99	FW	CMR	Joseph Mbollo
