= Tajikistan national football team =

Association football team

Tajikistan
- Nickname(s): Шерҳои форсӣ, Sherhoi forsī (Persian Lions)
- Association: Tajikistan Football Federation (TFF)
- Confederation: AFC (Asia)
- Sub-confederation: CAFA (Central Asia)
- Head coach: Igor Angelovski
- Captain: Parvizdzhon Umarbayev
- Most caps: Akhtam Nazarov (102)
- Top scorer: Manuchekhr Dzhalilov (20)
- Home stadium: Markazii Jumhuriyavii Stadium
- FIFA code: TJK
| First colours | Second colours |

FIFA ranking
- Current: 100 (18 November 2026)
- Highest: 99 (15 February 2024)
- Lowest: 180 (July 2003, October 2003)

First international
- Tajikistan 2–2 Uzbekistan (Dushanbe, Tajikistan; 17 June 1992)

Biggest win
- Tajikistan 16–0 Guam (Tabriz, Iran; 26 November 2000)

Biggest defeat
- Japan 8–0 Tajikistan (Osaka, Japan; 11 October 2011)

Asian Cup
- Appearances: 2 (first in 2023)
- Best result: Quarter-finals (2023)

AFC Challenge Cup
- Appearances: 4 (first in 2006)
- Best result: Champions (2006)

Asian Games
- Appearances: 1 (first in 1998)
- Best result: Second round (1998)

CAFA Nations Cup
- Appearances: 2 (first in 2023)
- Best result: Group stage (2023)

The Tajikistan national football team (Note: Tajik: Тими миллии футболи Тоҷикистон, romanized: Timi millii futboli Tojikiston) represents Tajikistan in international football and is controlled by the Tajikistan Football Federation, the governing body for football in Tajikistan. Tajikistan's homeground is the Markazii Jumhuriyavii Stadium in Dushanbe.

== History ==
Tajikistan played its first official game on 11 April 1994 in Tashkent as part of a regional tournament. It lost that game against Kazakhstan 0–1. The first official competition the team entered was the qualifiers for the 1996 AFC Asian Cup, when it was seeded in the 3-team Group 8 with Uzbekistan and Bahrain. Bahrain later withdrew, leaving Tajikistan to a play-off against their Middle Asian neighbors. Tajikistan won the first game 4–0, and were beaten in the away game 0–5 after extra time. It did not enter a World Cup qualifying tournament until the 1998 FIFA World Cup edition, recording 4 victories in its preliminary group stage including a 5–0 triumph over Turkmenistan, and losing only to China, which placed it second behind its eastern neighbors, and out of the tournament.

Following Tajikistan's 2018 FIFA World Cup qualifying campaign, coach Mubin Ergashev and his staff were relieved of their duties.

Tajikistan were drawn into a 2019 AFC Asian Cup qualification group with the Philippines, Yemen and Nepal. Following defeat to the Philippines on 27 March 2018, confirming Tajikistan's failure to qualify for the Asian Cup, manager Khakim Fuzailov resigned.

After failing to have a direct spot for the 2023 AFC Asian Cup, Tajikistan hired Croatian manager Petar Šegrt, and Tajikistan took part in the third round of the 2023 AFC Asian Cup qualification, joining with Myanmar, Kyrgyzstan, and Singapore. Due to COVID-19 pandemic, the third round was played in a single round-robin group format with a centralised host, which Tajikistan's group saw its neighbour Kyrgyzstan hosting it. Tajikistan defeated Myanmar (4–0) and Singapore (1–0), before holding neighbour Kyrgyzstan to a goalless draw, topping the group and, after failing in 5 previous attempts, Tajikistan was able to qualify to its first-ever AFC Asian Cup and a major tournament in 2023. Tajikistan was invited to the 2022 King's Cup in Thailand held in September 2022 where Tajikistan defeated Trinidad and Tobago 2–1 and sees them advanced to the final defeating Malaysia in the penalty shootout winning their second international trophy.

In the 2023 AFC Asian Cup, Tajikistan reached the quarter-finals for the first time in their history after losing 1–0 to the eventual runner-up Jordan due to a 66th minute own goal from Vahdat Hanonov. Their coach, Petar Šegrt, left his post at the end of this epic campaign due to the expiry of his contract and was replaced by his assistant Gela Shekiladze.

In June 2025, it was announced that Tajikistan would co-host the second edition of the CAFA Nations Cup alongside Uzbekistan.

== Kit ==
In September 2017, Tajikistan's kit was supplied by Chinese sporting apparel company Li-Ning.

In September 2026, Kelme were announced as the new kit supply for the Tajikistan national team.

== Results and fixtures ==
The following is a list of match results in the last 12 months, as well as any future matches that have been scheduled.

Win Draw Loss Fixture

=== 2026 ===
| 31 March 2027 AFC Asian Cup qualification | Tajikistan | 1–1 | Philippines | Hisor, Tajikistan |
| 19:00 UTC+5 | Boboev 41' | Report | Obermair 19' | Stadium: Central Stadium; Attendance: 15,200; Referee: Hiroki Kasahara (Japan) |

| 5 June Friendly | Tajikistan | 3–1 | India | Tursunzoda, Tajikistan |
| | Boboev 9' (pen.); Karimov 62'; Panjshanbe 68' | | Choudhary 89' | Stadium: TALCO Arena; Attendance: 10,245; Referee: Asker Nadjafaliev (Uzbekistan) |

| 9 June Friendly | Tajikistan | 1–1 | India | Tursunzoda, Tajikistan |
| 20:00 UTC+5 | Boboev 85' (pen.) | Report | V. P. Singh 25' | Stadium: TALCO Arena; Attendance: 9,370; Referee: Akhrol Riskulloev (Uzbekistan) |

| 23 September Friendly | Azerbaijan | 1–0 | Tajikistan | Baku, Azerbaijan |
| 21:00 UTC+5 | Baklov 58' (o.g.) | Report | | Stadium: Palms Sports Arena; Referee: Roman Jitari (Moldova) |

| 28 September 2026 China Competition | Tajikistan | 2–4 | Palestine | Chongqing, China |
| 17:00 UTC+5 | Boboev 4' (pen.); Babadjanov 24'; Dzhuraboyev (yellow card) (yellow-red card) 53' | Report | Al Hamlawi 21', 45+2'; Hassan 46'; Dabbagh 74' | Stadium: Tongliang Long Stadium |

| 6 October 2026 China Competition | China | 0–1 | Tajikistan | Chongqing, China |
| 16:35 UTC+5 | | Report | Hanonov 53' | Stadium: Longxing Football Stadium; Attendance: 19,984; Referee: Choi Hyun-jae (South Korea) |

| 14 November 2026 King's Cup | Oman | 0–1 | Tajikistan | Sisaket, Thailand |
| 14:00 UTC+5 | | Report | Boboev 60' (pen.) | Stadium: Sisaket Province Stadium |

| 17 November 2026 King's Cup | Tajikistan | 0–3 | Thailand | Sisaket, Thailand |
| | | | | Stadium: Sisaket Province Stadium |

=== 2027 ===
| 10 January 2027 Asian Cup GS | Tajikistan | v | Iraq | Riyadh, Saudi Arabia |
| --:-- | | | | Stadium: Al Shabab Stadium |

| 14 January 2027 Asian Cup GS | Singapore | v | Tajikistan | Riyadh, Saudi Arabia |
| --:-- | | | | Stadium: Imam Mohammed Ibn Saud University Stadium |

| 19 January 2027 Asian Cup GS | Australia | v | Tajikistan | Riyadh, Saudi Arabia |
| --:-- | | | | Stadium: Al Shabab Stadium |

== Coaching staff ==
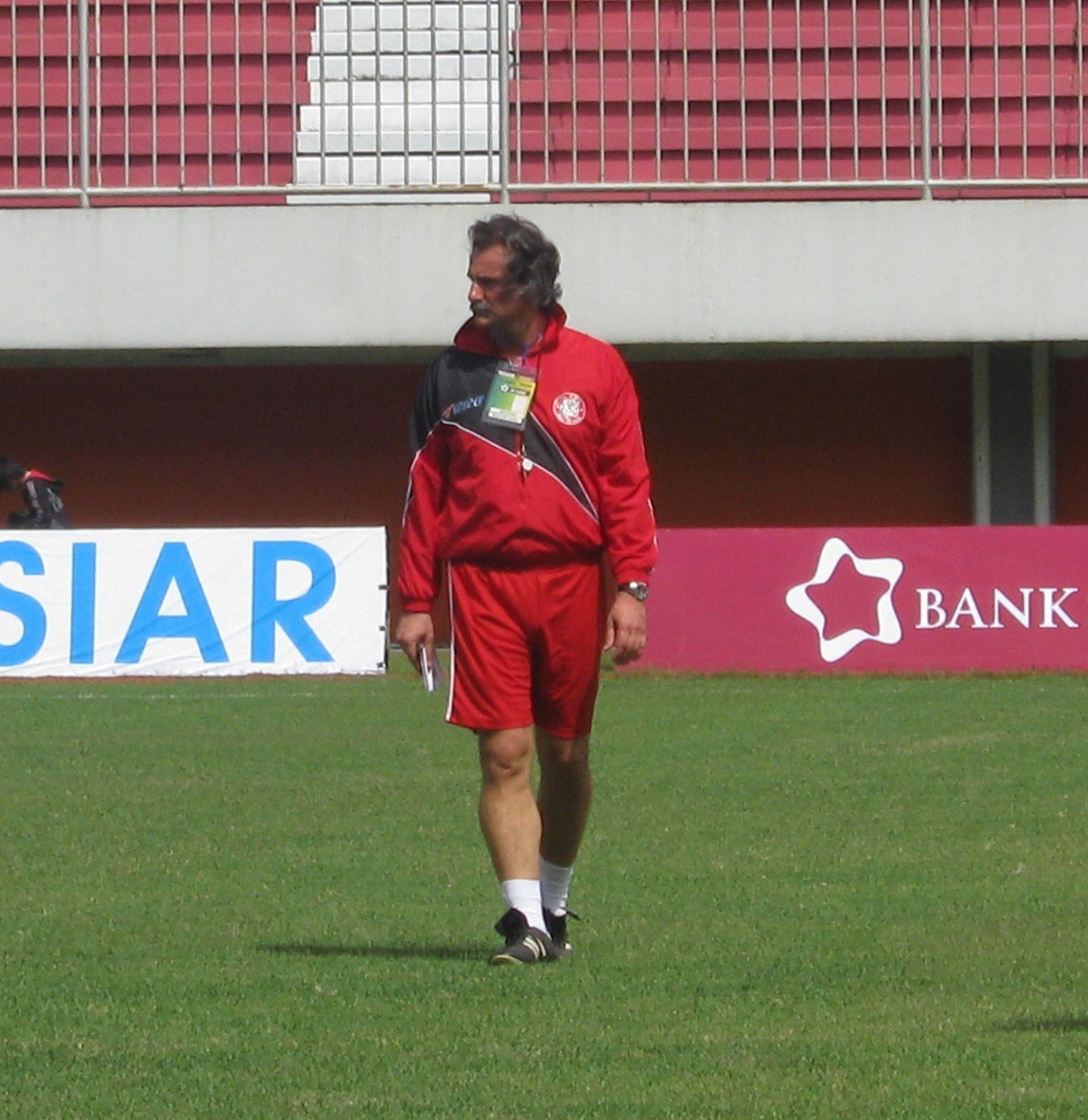
Petar Šegrt became the manager of Tajikistan in 2022

As of April 2026

| Position | Name |
|---|---|
| Head coach | (North Macedonia) Igor Angelovski |
| Assistant coach | (Serbia) Milan Pavlović |
| Assistant coach | (Serbia) Radmilo Azanjac |
| Goalkeeping coach | (Tajikistan) Alisher Tuychiev |
| Fitness coach | (Montenegro) Vladimir Krunić |
| Fitness coach | (Belarus) Andrey Misyuk |
| Chief analyst | (Tajikistan) Alifbek Beromov |

=== Coaching history ===
Caretaker managers are listed in italics.

- (Tajikistan) Sharif Nazarov (1992–1994)
- (Tajikistan) Vladimir Ghulamhaydarov (1994–1995)
- (Tajikistan) Abdulla Muradov (1996)
- (Tajikistan) Zair Babayev (1997–1998)
- (Tajikistan) Sharif Nazarov (1999)
- (Tajikistan) Salahiddin Ghafurov (2000–2002)
- (Tajikistan) Sharif Nazarov (2003)
- (Tajikistan) Zair Babayev (2004)
- (Tajikistan) Sharif Nazarov (2004–2006)
- (Tajikistan) Mahmadjan Habibullayev (2007)
- (Tajikistan) Pulad Qadirov (2008–2011)
- (Tajikistan) Alimjan Rafiqov (2011–2012)
- (Bosnia and Herzegovina) Kemal Alispahić (2012)
- (Serbia) Nikola Kavazović (2012–2013)
- (Tajikistan) Mubin Ergashev (2013)
- (Russia) Mukhsin Mukhamadiev (2013–2015)
- (Tajikistan) Mubin Ergashev (2015–2016)
- (Tajikistan) Hakim Fuzaylov (2016–2018)
- (Tajikistan) Alisher Tuhtayev (2018)
- (Uzbekistan) Usmon Toshev (2018–2021)
- (Tajikistan) Mubin Ergashev (2021)
- (Croatia) Petar Šegrt (2022–2024)
- (Georgia (country)) Gela Shekiladze (2024–2025)
- (Serbia) Goran Stevanović (2025–2026)
- (North Macedonia) Igor Angelovski (2026–)

== Players ==
=== Current squad ===
The following 24 players were called up for Tajikistan's matches in the 2026 King's Cup on 14 November against Oman, and against either Thailand or Brunei on 17 November 2026.

Caps and goals updated as of 14 November 2026, after the match against Oman.

| No. | Pos. | Player | Date of birth (age) | Caps | Goals | Club |
|---|---|---|---|---|---|---|
| 1 | GK | Rustam Yatimov | 13 July 1998 (age 28) | 54 | 0 | (Russian Football Union) Rostov |
| 16 | GK | Daler Azizov | 19 May 2000 (age 26) | 1 | 0 | (Tajikistan Football Federation) Khosilot Farkhor |
| 23 | GK | Oleg Baklov | 20 October 1994 (age 32) | 10 | 0 | (Association of Football Federations of Azerbaijan) Turan Tovuz |
| 2 | DF | Zoir Dzhuraboyev | 16 September 1998 (age 28) | 63 | 3 | (Uzbekistan Football Association) Sogdiana Jizzakh |
| 3 | DF | Tabrez Islomov | 6 June 1998 (age 28) | 48 | 1 | (Tajikistan Football Federation) Istiklol |
| 4 | DF | Sodikjon Kurbonov | 19 January 2003 (age 23) | 15 | 0 | (Tajikistan Football Federation) Istiklol |
| 6 | DF | Vahdat Hanonov | 25 July 2000 (age 26) | 48 | 6 | (Tajikistan Football Federation) Istiklol |
| 12 | DF | Muso Kakhorov | 1 June 2007 (age 19) | 4 | 0 | (Tajikistan Football Federation) Barkchi Hisor |
| 19 | DF | Akhtam Nazarov | 29 September 1992 (age 34) | 102 | 5 | (Tajikistan Football Federation) Vakhsh Bokhtar |
| 20 | DF | Alidzhon Karomatullozoda | 5 May 2002 (age 24) | 14 | 0 | (Tajikistan Football Federation) Istiklol |
| 21 | DF | Mekhrubon Karimov | 9 January 2004 (age 22) | 14 | 1 | (Tajikistan Football Federation) Ravshan Kulob |
| 7 | MF | Parvizdzhon Umarbayev | 1 November 1994 (age 32) | 76 | 11 | (Bulgarian Football Union) Lokomotiv Plovdiv |
| 8 | MF | Amirbek Juraboev | 13 April 1996 (age 30) | 74 | 1 | (Tajikistan Football Federation) Istiklol |
| 11 | MF | Mukhammadzhon Rakhimov | 15 October 1998 (age 28) | 56 | 4 | (Tajikistan Football Federation) Istiklol |
| 17 | MF | Ehson Panjshanbe | 12 May 1999 (age 27) | 73 | 9 | (Tajikistan Football Federation) Istiklol |
| 18 | MF | Alisher Shukurov | 30 March 2002 (age 24) | 23 | 0 | (Tajikistan Football Federation) Istiklol |
| 24 | MF | Abdullo Ibragimzoda | 20 October 2008 (age 18) | 1 | 0 | (Saudi Arabian Football Federation) Al Qadsiah |
| 25 | MF | Nozim Babadjanov | 7 August 1995 (age 31) | 19 | 1 | (Tajikistan Football Federation) Regar-TadAZ |
| 26 | MF | Azizbek Khaitov | 6 April 2003 (age 23) | 1 | 0 | (Tajikistan Football Federation) Regar-TadAZ |
| | MF | Salokhiddin Irgashev | 3 July 2003 (age 23) | 9 | 0 | (Tajikistan Football Federation) Khosilot Farkhor |
| 5 | FW | Faridun Davlatov | 12 February 2004 (age 22) | 0 | 0 | (Tajikistan Football Federation) Regar-TadAZ |
| 9 | FW | Jahongir Ergashev | 6 March 1994 (age 32) | 38 | 4 | (Tajikistan Football Federation) Khujand |
| 10 | FW | Shervoni Mabatshoev | 4 December 2000 (age 25) | 46 | 13 | (Tajikistan Football Federation) Istiklol |
| 13 | FW | Nuriddin Khamrokulov | 25 October 1999 (age 27) | 30 | 2 | (Tajikistan Football Federation) Vakhsh Bokhtar |
| 14 | FW | Sheriddin Boboev | 21 April 1999 (age 27) | 33 | 8 | (Tajikistan Football Federation) Khosilot Farkhor |

=== Recent call-ups ===
The following players have been called up during the past 12 months.

| Pos. | Player | Date of birth (age) | Caps | Goals | Club | Latest call-up |
|---|---|---|---|---|---|---|
| GK | Mukhriddin Khasanov | 23 September 2002 (age 24) | 3 | 0 | (Tajikistan) Istiklol | 2026 King's Cup^{PRE} |
| DF | Daler Imomnazarov | 31 May 1995 (age 31) | 8 | 0 | (Tajikistan) Regar-TadAZ | 2026 King's Cup^{PRE} |
| DF | Rakhmatsho Rakhmatzoda | 6 April 2004 (age 22) | 5 | 0 | (Indonesia) PSIM Yogyakarta | 2026 King's Cup^{PRE} |
| DF | Abdusamad Melikmurodov | 24 June 2008 (age 18) | 1 | 0 | (Tajikistan) Regar-TadAZ | 2026 King's Cup^{PRE} |
| DF | Abdullo Sharipov | 3 May 2004 (age 22) | 0 | 0 | (Tajikistan) Regar-TadAZ | 2026 King's Cup^{PRE} |
| DF | Muhammadjon Isakov | 5 November 2007 (age 19) | 0 | 0 | (Tajikistan) Sardor | 2026 King's Cup^{PRE} |
| DF | Manuchekhr Safarov | 31 May 2001 (age 25) | 57 | 2 | (Tajikistan) Istiklol | v. Philippines, 31 March 2026 |
| DF | Furkon Rakhimzoda | 25 August 2009 (age 17) | 0 | 0 | (Tajikistan) Khosilot Farkhor | v. Philippines, 31 March 2026 |
| DF | Sayyodi Kovusho | 2 June 1995 (age 31) | 0 | 0 | (Tajikistan) Ravshan Kulob | v. Philippines, 31 March 2026 |
| DF | Akhmadzhon Shoev | 8 January 2008 (age 18) | 0 | 0 | (Tajikistan) Sardor | v. Philippines, 31 March 2026 |
| MF | Alisher Dzhalilov (captain) | 29 August 1993 (age 33) | 39 | 7 | (Tajikistan) Istiklol | 2026 King's Cup^{PRE} |
| MF | Fatkhullo Olimzoda | 3 August 2005 (age 21) | 8 | 0 | (Tajikistan) Ravshan Kulob | 2026 King's Cup^{PRE} |
| MF | Ruslan Khayloyev | 29 October 2003 (age 23) | 4 | 0 | (Tajikistan) Ravshan Kulob | 2026 King's Cup^{PRE} |
| MF | Furkon Rakhimzoda | 25 August 2009 (age 17) | 2 | 0 | (Tajikistan) Khosilot Farkhor | v. China, 6 October 2026 |
| MF | Murodali Aknazarov | 19 November 2004 (age 21) | 5 | 0 | (Tajikistan) Ravshan Kulob | v. Philippines, 9 June 2026 |
| MF | Abubakr Sulaimonov | 18 September 2006 (age 20) | 2 | 0 | (Tajikistan) Sardor | v. Philippines, 9 June 2026 |
| MF | Dzhamshed Maksumov | 5 May 1999 (age 27) | 0 | 0 | (Tajikistan) Ravshan Kulob | v. Philippines, 9 June 2026 |
| MF | Dzhovidon Khushvakhtov | 25 August 2006 (age 20) | 1 | 0 | (Tajikistan) Barkchi Hisor | v. Philippines, 31 March 2026 |
| FW | Shahrom Samiev | 8 February 2001 (age 25) | 49 | 14 | (Tajikistan) Istiklol | 2026 King's Cup^{PRE} |
| FW | Rustam Soirov | 12 September 2002 (age 24) | 34 | 5 | (Tajikistan) Istiklol | 2026 King's Cup^{PRE} |
| FW | Mekhron Madaminov | 1 May 2002 (age 24) | 1 | 0 | (Tajikistan) Barkchi Hisor | 2026 King's Cup^{PRE} |
| FW | Daler Sharipov | 13 February 2004 (age 22) | 6 | 0 | (Tajikistan) Istiklol | v. Philippines, 9 June 2026 |
^{INJ} Withdrew due to injury^{RET} Retired^{WTH} Withdrawn^{PRE} Preliminary squad

== Records ==
As of match played 14 November 2026.
Players in bold are still active with Tajikistan.

=== Most appearances ===
| Rank | Player | Caps | Goals | Career |
|---|---|---|---|---|
| 1 | **Akhtam Nazarov** | 102 | 5 | 2011–present |
| 2 | **Parvizdzhon Umarbayev** | 76 | 11 | 2015–present |
| 3 | **Amirbek Juraboev** | 74 | 1 | 2014–present |
| 4 | **Ehson Panjshanbe** | 73 | 9 | 2016–present |
| 5 | Davron Erghashev | 72 | 8 | 2008–2022 |
| 6 | Fatkhullo Fatkhuloev | 71 | 10 | 2007–2019 |
| 7 | **Zoir Dzhuraboyev** | 63 | 3 | 2016–present |
| 8 | **Manuchekhr Safarov** | 57 | 2 | 2019–present |
| 9 | **Mukhammadzhon Rakhimov** | 56 | 4 | 2016–present |
| 10 | Manuchekhr Dzhalilov | 54 | 20 | 2011–2025 |
| 10 | **Rustam Yatimov** | 54 | 0 | 2019–present |

=== Top goalscorers ===
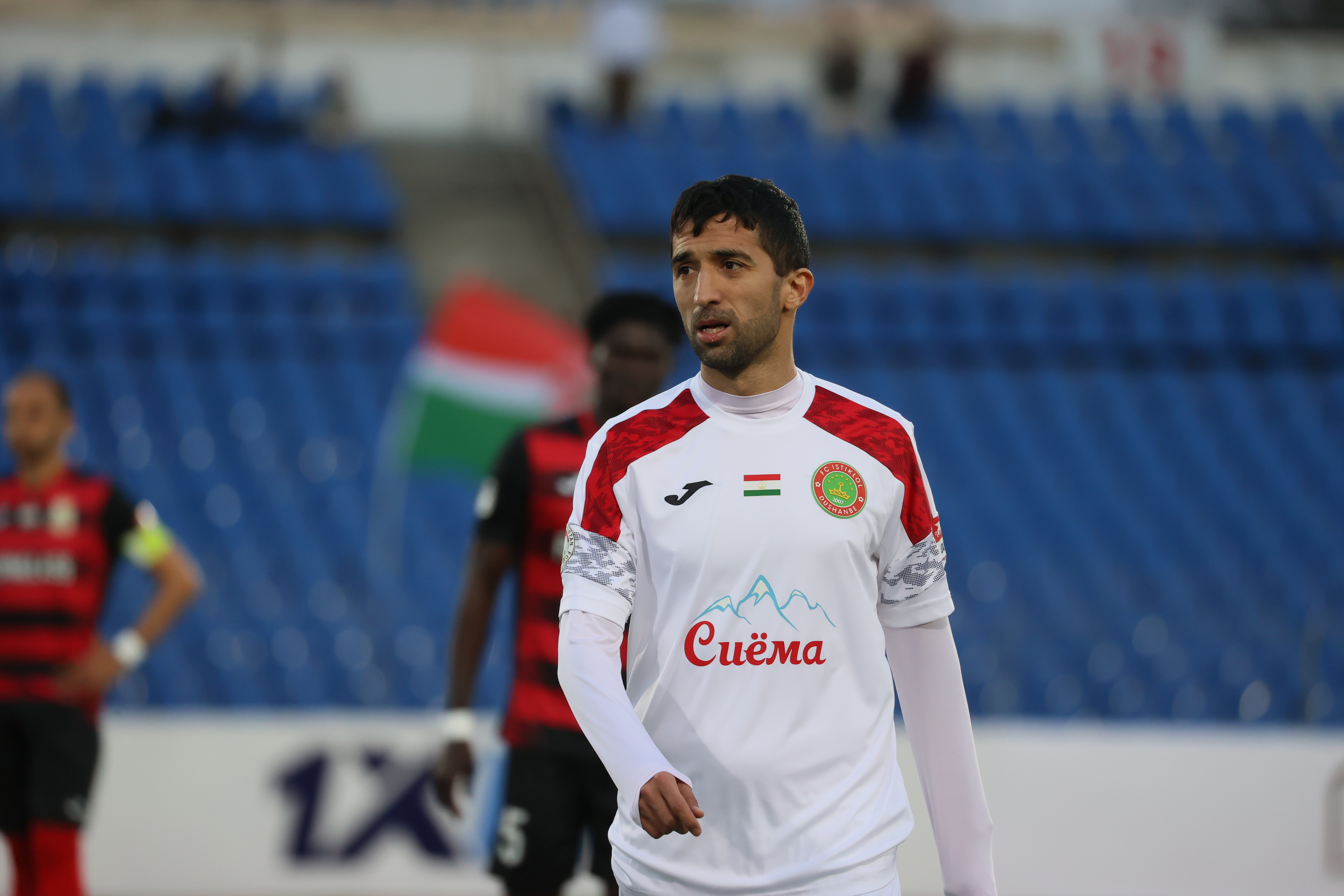
Manuchekhr Dzhalilov is Tajikistan's top scorer with 20 goals.

| Rank | Player | Goals | Caps | Ratio | Career |
|---|---|---|---|---|---|
| 1 | Manuchekhr Dzhalilov | 20 | 54 | 0.37 | 2011–2025 |
| 2 | Yusuf Rabiev | 15 | 40 | 0.38 | 2003–2015 |
| 3 | **Shahrom Samiev** | 14 | 49 | 0.29 | 2019–present |
| 4 | Numonjon Hakimov | 13 | 36 | 0.36 | 2003–2011 |
| 4 | **Shervoni Mabatshoyev** | 13 | 46 | 0.28 | 2018–present |
| 6 | Tokhirjon Muminov | 11 | 27 | 0.41 | 1993–2003 |
| 6 | **Parvizdzhon Umarbayev** | 11 | 76 | 0.14 | 2015–present |
| 8 | Fatkhullo Fatkhuloev | 10 | 71 | 0.14 | 2007–2019 |
| 9 | Nuriddin Davronov | 9 | 51 | 0.18 | 2008–2021 |
| 9 | Dilshod Vasiev | 9 | 52 | 0.17 | 2006–2015 |
| 9 | **Ehson Panjshanbe** | 9 | 73 | 0.12 | 2016–present |

== Competitive record ==
=== FIFA World Cup ===
| FIFA World Cup record | | | | | | | | | Qualification record | | | | | |
| Year | Result | Position | Pld | W | D* | L | GF | GA | Pld | W | D | L | GF | GA |
|---|---|---|---|---|---|---|---|---|---|---|---|---|---|---|
| (Uruguay) 1930 to (Italy) 1990 | Part of the Soviet Union | | | | | | | | Part of the Soviet Union | | | | | |
| (United States) 1994 | Not a FIFA member | | | | | | | | Not a FIFA member | | | | | |
| (France) 1998 | Did not qualify | | | | | | | | 6 | 4 | 1 | 1 | 15 | 2 |
| (South Korea) (Japan) 2002 | Did not qualify | | | | | | | | 2 | 1 | 0 | 1 | 16 | 2 |
| (Germany) 2006 | Did not qualify | | | | | | | | 8 | 4 | 1 | 3 | 9 | 9 |
| (South Africa) 2010 | Did not qualify | | | | | | | | 4 | 1 | 2 | 1 | 7 | 4 |
| (Brazil) 2014 | Did not qualify | | | | | | | | 8 | 2 | 1 | 5 | 7 | 18 |
| (Russia) 2018 | Did not qualify | | | | | | | | 8 | 1 | 2 | 5 | 9 | 20 |
| (Qatar) 2022 | Did not qualify | | | | | | | | 8 | 4 | 1 | 3 | 14 | 12 |
| (Canada) (Mexico) (United States) 2026 | Did not qualify | | | | | | | | 6 | 2 | 2 | 2 | 11 | 7 |
| (Morocco) (Portugal) (Spain) 2030 | To be determined | | | | | | | | To be determined | | | | | |
| (Saudi Arabia) 2034 | To be determined | | | | | | | | To be determined | | | | | |
| Total | — | 0/8 | | | | | | | 40 | 19 | 10 | 21 | 88 | 74 |

=== AFC Asian Cup ===
| AFC Asian Cup record | | | | | | | | | Qualification record | | | | | |
| Year | Result | Position | Pld | W | D* | L | GF | GA | Pld | W | D | L | GF | GA |
|---|---|---|---|---|---|---|---|---|---|---|---|---|---|---|
| (Hong Kong) 1956 to (Qatar) 1988 | Part of the Soviet Union | | | | | | | | Part of the Soviet Union | | | | | |
| (Japan) 1992 | Did not enter | | | | | | | | Did not enter | | | | | |
| (United Arab Emirates) 1996 | Did not qualify | | | | | | | | 2 | 1 | 0 | 1 | 4 | 5 |
| (Lebanon) 2000 | Did not qualify | | | | | | | | 3 | 2 | 0 | 1 | 6 | 5 |
| (China) 2004 | Did not qualify | | | | | | | | 6 | 2 | 2 | 2 | 3 | 5 |
| (Indonesia) (Malaysia) (Thailand) (Vietnam) 2007 | Did not enter | | | | | | | | Did not enter | | | | | |
| (Qatar) 2011 | Did not qualify | | | | | | | | 2008 AFC Challenge Cup / 2010 AFC Challenge Cup | | | | | |
| (Australia) 2015 | Did not qualify | | | | | | | | 2012 AFC Challenge Cup / 2014 AFC Challenge Cup | | | | | |
| (United Arab Emirates) 2019 | Did not qualify | | | | | | | | 16 | 5 | 3 | 8 | 25 | 29 |
| (Qatar) 2023 | Quarter-finals | 8th | 5 | 1 | 2 | 2 | 3 | 4 | 11 | 6 | 2 | 3 | 19 | 12 |
| (Saudi Arabia) 2027 | Qualified | | | | | | | | 6 | 2 | 2 | 2 | 11 | 7 |
| Total | Quarter-finals | 1/7 | 5 | 1 | 2 | 2 | 3 | 4 | 44 | 18 | 9 | 17 | 68 | 63 |

=== AFC Challenge Cup ===
| AFC Challenge Cup record | | | | | | | | Qualification record | | | | | |
| Year | Position | Pld | W | D* | L | GF | GA | Pld | W | D* | L | GF | GA |
|---|---|---|---|---|---|---|---|---|---|---|---|---|---|
| (Bangladesh) 2006 | Champions | 6 | 5 | 0 | 1 | 18 | 2 | —N/a | | | | | |
| (India) 2008 | Runners-up | 5 | 2 | 2 | 1 | 7 | 5 | 3 | 2 | 0 | 1 | 7 | 1 |
| (Sri Lanka) 2010 | Third place | 5 | 3 | 0 | 2 | 8 | 5 | Automatic Qualifier | | | | | |
| (Nepal) 2012 | Group stage | 3 | 1 | 0 | 2 | 3 | 4 | 3 | 2 | 1 | 0 | 4 | 0 |
| (Maldives) 2014 | Did not qualify | | | | | | | 3 | 2 | 0 | 1 | 4 | 1 |
| Total | 1 Title | 16 | 10 | 2 | 3 | 32 | 12 | 9 | 6 | 1 | 2 | 15 | 2 |

=== Asian Games ===
Football at the Asian Games has been an under-23 tournament since 2002.

Asian Games record
| Year | Position | Pld | W | D* | L | GF | GA |
|---|---|---|---|---|---|---|---|
| 1951 to 1990 | Part of the Soviet Union | | | | | | |
| (Japan) 1994 | Did not enter | | | | | | |
| (Thailand) 1998 | Second round | 5 | 1 | 1 | 3 | 8 | 13 |
| 2002 to present | See Tajikistan national under-23 football team | | | | | | |
| Total | | 5 | 1 | 1 | 3 | 8 | 13 |

=== CAFA Nations Cup ===
CAFA Nations Cup record
| Year | Position | Pld | W | D | L | GF | GA |
|---|---|---|---|---|---|---|---|
| (Kyrgyzstan) (Uzbekistan) 2023 | Group stage | 3 | 0 | 2 | 1 | 3 | 7 |
| (Tajikistan) (Uzbekistan) 2025 | Group stage | 3 | 1 | 1 | 1 | 5 | 4 |
| Total | | 6 | 1 | 3 | 2 | 8 | 11 |

== Honours ==
=== Continental ===
- AFC Challenge Cup
  - (gold) Champions (1): 2006
  - (silver) Runners-up (1): 2008
  - (bronze) Third place (1): 2010

=== Friendly ===
- King's Cup (1): 2022
- Merdeka Tournament (1): 2023

=== Summary ===
Only official honours are included, according to FIFA statutes (competitions organized/recognized by FIFA or an affiliated confederation).

| Competition | 1st place, gold medalist(s) | 2nd place, silver medalist(s) | 3rd place, bronze medalist(s) | Total |
|---|---|---|---|---|
| AFC Challenge Cup | 1 | 1 | 1 | 3 |
| Total | 1 | 1 | 1 | 3 |

== Head-to-head record ==
As of match played 14 November 2026 against the Oman.

| National team | Played | Won | Drawn | Lost | GF | GA | GD | % Won | Confederation |
|---|---|---|---|---|---|---|---|---|---|
| Afghanistan | 8 | 7 | 1 | 0 | 17 | 2 | +15 | 87.50 | AFC |
| Australia | 2 | 0 | 0 | 2 | 0 | 10 | −10 | 0.00 | AFC |
| Azerbaijan | 2 | 0 | 0 | 2 | 2 | 4 | −2 | 0.00 | UEFA |
| Bahrain | 5 | 0 | 2 | 3 | 1 | 11 | −10 | 0.00 | AFC |
| Bangladesh | 10 | 7 | 2 | 1 | 29 | 5 | +24 | 70.00 | AFC |
| Belarus | 2 | 0 | 0 | 2 | 1 | 11 | −10 | 0.00 | UEFA |
| Bhutan | 1 | 1 | 0 | 0 | 3 | 1 | +2 | 100.00 | AFC |
| Brunei | 1 | 1 | 0 | 0 | 4 | 0 | +4 | 100.00 | AFC |
| Cambodia | 2 | 2 | 0 | 0 | 5 | 1 | +4 | 100.00 | AFC |
| China | 7 | 1 | 2 | 4 | 2 | 9 | −7 | 14.29 | AFC |
| Estonia | 1 | 0 | 0 | 1 | 1 | 2 | −1 | 0.00 | UEFA |
| Hong Kong | 2 | 1 | 1 | 0 | 1 | 0 | +1 | 50.00 | AFC |
| Guam | 1 | 1 | 0 | 0 | 16 | 0 | +16 | 100.00 | AFC |
| India | 8 | 4 | 2 | 2 | 16 | 11 | +5 | 50.00 | AFC |
| Iran | 4 | 0 | 1 | 3 | 3 | 15 | −12 | 0.00 | AFC |
| Iraq | 2 | 0 | 1 | 1 | 1 | 2 | −1 | 0.00 | AFC |
| Japan | 4 | 0 | 0 | 4 | 1 | 19 | −18 | 0.00 | AFC |
| Jordan | 7 | 1 | 1 | 5 | 3 | 13 | −10 | 14.29 | AFC |
| Kazakhstan | 5 | 0 | 1 | 4 | 3 | 9 | −6 | 0.00 | UEFA |
| Kuwait | 2 | 0 | 0 | 2 | 1 | 5 | −4 | 0.00 | AFC |
| Kyrgyzstan | 14 | 8 | 3 | 3 | 16 | 10 | +6 | 57.14 | AFC |
| Lebanon | 2 | 1 | 0 | 1 | 2 | 2 | +0 | 50.00 | AFC |
| Macau | 2 | 2 | 0 | 0 | 7 | 0 | +7 | 100.00 | AFC |
| Malaysia | 4 | 2 | 1 | 1 | 6 | 2 | +4 | 50.00 | AFC |
| Maldives | 5 | 4 | 1 | 0 | 10 | 0 | +10 | 80.00 | AFC |
| Mongolia | 2 | 2 | 0 | 0 | 4 | 0 | +4 | 100.00 | AFC |
| Myanmar | 5 | 4 | 0 | 1 | 15 | 4 | +11 | 80.00 | AFC |
| Nepal | 4 | 4 | 0 | 0 | 11 | 1 | +10 | 100.00 | AFC |
| North Korea | 6 | 1 | 1 | 4 | 2 | 6 | −4 | 16.67 | AFC |
| Oman | 7 | 2 | 2 | 3 | 10 | 12 | −2 | 28.57 | AFC |
| Pakistan | 4 | 4 | 0 | 0 | 12 | 1 | +11 | 100.00 | AFC |
| Palestine | 5 | 0 | 3 | 2 | 6 | 10 | −4 | 0.00 | AFC |
| Philippines | 9 | 1 | 4 | 4 | 10 | 14 | −4 | 11.11 | AFC |
| Qatar | 5 | 1 | 0 | 4 | 3 | 11 | −8 | 20.00 | AFC |
| Russia | 1 | 0 | 1 | 0 | 0 | 0 | +0 | 0.00 | UEFA |
| Saudi Arabia | 3 | 0 | 1 | 2 | 1 | 5 | −4 | 0.00 | AFC |
| Singapore | 4 | 2 | 1 | 1 | 4 | 3 | +1 | 50.00 | AFC |
| South Korea | 1 | 0 | 0 | 1 | 1 | 4 | −3 | 0.00 | AFC |
| Sri Lanka | 4 | 3 | 1 | 0 | 11 | 3 | +8 | 75.00 | AFC |
| Syria | 9 | 3 | 1 | 5 | 11 | 8 | +3 | 33.33 | AFC |
| Thailand | 3 | 1 | 1 | 1 | 3 | 3 | +0 | 33.33 | AFC |
| Timor-Leste | 2 | 2 | 0 | 0 | 6 | 0 | +6 | 100.00 | AFC |
| Trinidad and Tobago | 1 | 1 | 0 | 0 | 2 | 1 | +1 | 100.00 | CONCACAF |
| Turkmenistan | 7 | 3 | 2 | 2 | 11 | 6 | +5 | 42.86 | AFC |
| Uganda | 1 | 0 | 1 | 0 | 1 | 1 | +0 | 0.00 | CAF |
| United Arab Emirates | 3 | 0 | 2 | 1 | 3 | 4 | −1 | 0.00 | AFC |
| Uzbekistan | 9 | 1 | 2 | 6 | 8 | 21 | −13 | 11.11 | AFC |
| Vietnam | 2 | 2 | 0 | 0 | 8 | 0 | +8 | 100.00 | AFC |
| Yemen | 4 | 1 | 1 | 2 | 3 | 4 | −1 | 25.00 | AFC |
| Total | 204 | 81 | 43 | 80 | 297 | 266 | +31 | 39.71 | 4/6 |
