= Bahrain national football team results (2010–2019) =

This article provides details of international football games played by the Bahrain national team from 2010 to 2019.

== Results ==
=== 2010 ===
6 January 2010 2011 Asian Cup qualification	Bahrain	4–0	Hong Kong	Riffa, Bahrain
18:00 UTC+3	Abdullatif 35', 40', 44'; Adnan 79'			Stadium: Bahrain National Stadium; Attendance: 1,550; Referee: Abdullah Balideh (Qatar)

20 January 2010 2011 Asian Cup qualification	Yemen	3–0	Bahrain	Sana'a, Yemen
16:15 UTC+3	Al-Nono 5', 25'; Al Abidi 86'			Stadium: Ali Mohsen Al-Muraisi Stadium; Attendance: 7,000; Referee: Mohsen Torky (Iran)

25 February 2010 Friendly	Kuwait	4–1	Bahrain	United Arab Emirates

3 March 2010 2011 Asian Cup qualification	Japan	2–0	Bahrain	Toyota, Japan
19:00 UTC+9	Okazaki 36'; Honda 90+2'			Stadium: Toyota Stadium; Attendance: 38,042; Referee: Abdul Malik Abdul Bashir (Singapore)

11 August 2010 Friendly	China	1–1	Bahrain	China

3 September 2010 Friendly	Qatar	1–1	Bahrain	Qatar

7 September 2010 Unofficial Friendly	Bahrain	3–0	Togo	Bahrain

19 September 2010 Friendly	Jordan	2–0	Bahrain	Jordan

24 September 2010 2010 WAFF	Iran	3–0	Bahrain	King Abdullah Stadium, Amman
19:00 GMT	Aghili 36', 38'; Oladi 47'	Report		Attendance: 8,000; Referee: Nasser Al-Ghafari (Jordan)

2010 WAFF	Bahrain	2–0	Oman	King Abdullah Stadium, Amman
15:00 GMT	Abdullatif 63', 67'	Report		Attendance: 1,000

8 October 2010 Friendly	Kuwait	1–3	Bahrain	Kuwait

12 October 2010 Friendly	Bahrain	2–4	Uzbekistan	Riffa, Bahrain
	Faouzi Mubarak Aaish 30'; Hussain Salman 53'	Report	Olim Navkarov 6'; Alexander Geynrikh 13'; Odil Ahmedov 41'; Maksim Shatskikh 45'	Stadium: Bahrain National; Referee: (Saudi Arabia) Abdulrahman Amri

10 November 2010 Friendly	Bahrain	0–0	Uganda	Bahrain

14 November 2010 Friendly	Bahrain	0–2	Syria	Bahrain

23 November 2010 2010 Gulf Cup	Oman	1–1	Bahrain	May 22 Stadium, Aden
16:00	Al Hosni 37'		Al Mishkhas 67'	Referee: Naser Al Enezi (Kuwait)

26 November 2010 2010 Gulf Cup	Bahrain	2–3	Iraq	May 22 Stadium, Aden
19:00	Ayesh 44'; Abdullatif 90+6'		Abdul-Zahra 24', 57'; Hawar 90'	Referee: Khalaf Mohammad Allabany (Yemen)

29 November 2010 2010 Gulf Cup	United Arab Emirates	3–1	Bahrain	May 22 Stadium, Aden
19:00	Khater 4'; F. Juma 8'; A. Juma 64'		Fatadi 35'	Referee: Khamis Al Marry (Qatar)

25 December 2010 Friendly	Bahrain	1–1	Uzbekistan	Dubai, United Arab Emirates
	Salman Isa 90+4'	Report	Alexander Geynrikh 11'	Stadium: Al-Maktoum

28 December 2010 Friendly	Bahrain	2–1	Jordan	Dubai, United Arab Emirates

31 December 2010 Friendly	Bahrain	0–1	Saudi Arabia	Bahrain

=== 2011 ===
4 January 2011 Friendly	Bahrain	0–1	North Korea	Riffa, Bahrain
			An Chol-hyok 59'	Stadium: Bahrain National Stadium

10 January 2011 2011 Asian Cup	South Korea	2–1	Bahrain	Doha, Qatar
19:15 UTC+3	Koo Ja-Cheol 40', 52'		Aaish 85' (pen.)	Stadium: Thani bin Jassim Stadium; Attendance: 6,669; Referee: Abdullah Al Hilali (Oman)

14 January 2011 2011 Asian Cup	Bahrain	5–2	India	Doha, Qatar
19:15 UTC+3	Aaish 8' (pen.); Abdullatif 16', 19', 35', 77'		G. Singh 9'; Chhetri 52'	Stadium: Jassim bin Hamad Stadium; Attendance: 11,032; Referee: Subkhiddin Mohd Salleh (Malaysia)

18 January 2011 2011 Asian Cup	Australia	1–0	Bahrain	Doha, Qatar
16:15 UTC+3	Jedinak 37'			Stadium: Jassim bin Hamad Stadium; Attendance: 3,919; Referee: Yuichi Nishimura (Japan)

14 February 2011 Friendly	Bahrain	0–0	Kuwait

10 August 2011 Friendly	Oman	1–1	Bahrain
	Hadid 18'		Abdulrahman 34'

26 August 2011 Friendly	Bahrain	1–0	Sudan	Riffa, Bahrain
	Abdullatif 25'			Stadium: Bahrain National Stadium

2 September 2011 2014 World Cup qualification	Bahrain	0–0	Qatar	Bahrain

6 September 2011 2014 World Cup qualification	Indonesia	0–2	Bahrain	Jakarta, Indonesia

11 October 2011 2014 World Cup qualification	Iran	6–0	Bahrain	Tehran, Iran

4 November 2011 Friendly	Kuwait	0–1	Bahrain	Al Farwaniyah, Kuwait
17:30 UTC+3			Abdulrahman 45'	Stadium: Ali Sabah Al-Salem Stadium

11 November 2011 2014 World Cup qualification	Bahrain	1–1	Iran	Bahrain

15 November 2011 2014 World Cup qualification	Qatar	0–0	Bahrain	Qatar

6 December 2011 Friendly	Bahrain	0–1	Palestine	Arad, Bahrain
19:00 UTC+3			El-Khatib 69'	Stadium: Al Muharraq Stadium

13 December 2011 Football at the 2011 Pan Arab Games	Bahrain	3–0	Iraq	Doha, Qatar
17:30 UTC+3	Al Hardan 41'; Abdullatif 63' (pen.), 70'			Stadium: Jassim bin Hamad Stadium; Referee: Khaled Abdurahaman (Sudan)

20 December 2011 Football at the 2011 Pan Arab Games	Bahrain	3–1	Palestine	Al Rayyan, Qatar
17:30 UTC+3	Al Alawi 6'; Isa 44'; Abu Saleh 58' (o.g.)		Nu'man 40' (pen.)	Stadium: Thani bin Jassim Stadium; Referee: Andre El Haddad (Lebanon)

23 December 2011 Football at the 2011 Pan Arab Games	Bahrain	1–0	Jordan	Doha, Qatar
17:30 UTC+3	Abdullatif 89'			Stadium: Jassim bin Hamad Stadium; Referee: Abdullah Balideh (Qatar)

=== 2012 ===
18 January 2012 Friendly	Bahrain	0–2	Sweden	Doha, Qatar
				Stadium: Thani bin Jassim Stadium

29 February 2012 2014 World Cup qualification	Bahrain	10–0	Indonesia	Bahrain

8 June 2012 Friendly	Kuwait	1–1	Bahrain

12 June 2012 Friendly	Kuwait	1–0	Bahrain

23 June 2012 2012 Arab Nations Cup	Morocco	4–0	Bahrain	Saudi Arabia

26 June 2012 2012 Arab Nations Cup	Bahrain	0–2	Yemen	Saudi Arabia

29 June 2012 2012 Arab Nations Cup	Libya	2–1	Bahrain	Saudi Arabia

15 August 2012 Friendly	Azerbaijan	3–0	Bahrain

12 October 2012 Friendly	Bahrain	0–0	Philippines

16 October 2012 Friendly	Bahrain	2–6	United Arab Emirates

8 November 2012 Friendly	Bahrain	3–0	Jordan

14 November 2012 Friendly	Kuwait	1–1	Bahrain

29 November 2012 Friendly	Palestine	0–2	Bahrain

3 December 2012 Friendly	Bahrain	0–0	Iraq

9 December 2012 2012 WAFF	Bahrain	1–0	Yemen

12 December 2012 2012 WAFF	Iran	0–0	Bahrain

15 December 2012 2012 WAFF	Bahrain	1–0	Saudi Arabia

18 December 2012 2012 WAFF	Bahrain	1–2 (a.e.t.)	Syria

20 December 2012 2012 WAFF	Oman	1–0	Bahrain

29 December 2012 Friendly	Bahrain	3–0	Guinea

=== 2013 ===
5 January 2013 2013 Gulf Cup	Bahrain	0–0	Oman	Bahrain

8 January 2013 2013 Gulf Cup	Bahrain	1–2	United Arab Emirates	Bahrain

11 January 2013 2013 Gulf Cup	Bahrain	1–0	Qatar	Bahrain

15 January 2013 2013 Gulf Cup	Iraq	2–1	Bahrain	Bahrain

18 January 2013 2013 Gulf Cup	Bahrain	1–6	Kuwait	Bahrain

1 February 2013 Friendly	Bahrain	3–1	Singapore

6 February 2013 2015 AFC Asian Cup qualification	Yemen	0–2	Bahrain	Sharjah, United Arab Emirates

17 March 2013 Friendly	Bahrain	0–0	Lebanon

22 March 2013 2015 AFC Asian Cup qualification	Bahrain	1–0	Qatar	Bahrain

7 June 2013 Friendly	Bahrain	1–3	Kyrgyzstan

10 October 2013 Friendly	Thailand	1–0	Bahrain

15 October 2013 2015 AFC Asian Cup qualification	Malaysia	1–1	Bahrain

9 November 2013 Friendly	Bahrain	1–0	Lebanon

15 November 2013 2015 AFC Asian Cup qualification	Bahrain	1–0	Malaysia

19 November 2013 2015 AFC Asian Cup qualification	Bahrain	2–0	Yemen

25 December 2013 2014 WAFF	Oman	0–0	Bahrain	Qatar

28 December 2013 2014 WAFF	Bahrain	0–0	Iraq	Qatar

=== 2014 ===
4 January 2014 2014 WAFF	Bahrain	0–1	Jordan

7 January 2014 2014 WAFF	Kuwait	0–0 (a.e.t.)	Bahrain

5 March 2014 2015 Asian Cup qualification	Qatar	0–0	Bahrain	Qatar

9 September 2014 Friendly	Kuwait	0–1	Bahrain

10 October 2014 Friendly	Bahrain	0–0	Uzbekistan

14 October 2014 Friendly	Bahrain	0–0	Iraq

13 November 2014 2014 Gulf Cup	Yemen	0–0	Bahrain	Saudi Arabia

16 November 2014 2014 Gulf Cup	Saudi Arabia	3–0	Bahrain	Saudi Arabia

19 November 2014 2014 Gulf Cup	Bahrain	0–0	Qatar	Saudi Arabia

30 December 2014 Friendly	Bahrain	4–1	Saudi Arabia

=== 2015 ===
11 January 2015 2015 Asian Cup	Iran	2–0	Bahrain

15 January 2015 2015 Asian Cup	Bahrain	1–2	United Arab Emirates

19 January 2015 2015 Asian Cup	Qatar	1–2	Bahrain

26 March 2015 Friendly	Bahrain	0–6	Colombia

30 March 2015 Friendly	Bahrain	2–1	Philippines

5 June 2015 Friendly	Thailand	1–1	Bahrain

11 June 2015 2018 World Cup qualification	Philippines	2–1	Bahrain	Philippines

3 September 2015 2018 World Cup qualification	Bahrain	0–1	North Korea	Bahrain

8 September 2015 2018 World Cup qualification	Yemen	0–4	Bahrain

8 October 2015 2018 World Cup qualification	Bahrain	0–4	Uzbekistan	Bahrain

13 October 2015 2018 World Cup qualification	Bahrain	2–0	Philippines	Bahrain

17 November 2015 2018 World Cup qualification	North Korea	2–0	Bahrain	North Korea

=== 2016 ===
5 February 2016 Friendly	Bahrain	2–0	Lebanon

24 March 2016 2018 World Cup qualification	Bahrain	3–0	Yemen	Riffa, Bahrain
	Abdulatif 32' (pen.); Al-Malood 63'; Al Romaihi 90+2'			Stadium: Bahrain National Stadium; Attendance: 1,000; Referee: Ahmed Al-Kaf (Oman)

29 March 2016 2018 World Cup qualification	Uzbekistan	1–0	Bahrain	Tashkent, Uzbekistan
	Rashidov 50'			Stadium: Bunyodkor Stadium; Attendance: 34,000; Referee: Mohammed Abdulla Hassan Mohamed (United Arab Emirates)

1 September 2016 Friendly	Bahrain	3–1	Singapore

4 September 2016 Friendly	Bahrain	0–0	Jordan

7 October 2016 Friendly	Philippines	1–3	Bahrain

11 October 2016 Friendly	Oman	2–2	Bahrain

9 November 2016 Friendly	United Arab Emirates	2–0	Bahrain

15 November 2016 Friendly	Bahrain	0–0	Kyrgyzstan

=== 2017 ===
23 March 2017 Friendly	Bahrain	1–1	Tajikistan	Riffa, Bahrain
	Al Aswad 90'		Dzhalilov 4'	Stadium: Bahrain National Stadium

28 March 2017 2019 Asian Cup qualification	Bahrain	0–0	Singapore	Riffa, Bahrain
19:00 UTC+3		Report		Stadium: Bahrain National Stadium; Attendance: 225; Referee: Nivon Robesh Gamini (Sri Lanka)

6 June 2017 Friendly	Bahrain	0–2	Palestine	Riffa, Bahrain
22:00 UTC+3		Report	Salem 58'; Maraaba 83'	Stadium: Bahrain National Stadium

13 June 2017 2019 Asian Cup qualification	Turkmenistan	1–2	Bahrain	Daşoguz, Turkmenistan
18:00 UTC+5	Ýagşyýew 86'	Report	Al Romaihi 55'; Yaser 80'	Stadium: Sport Toplumy Stadium; Attendance: 9,500; Referee: Ma Ning (China PR)

29 August 2017 Friendly	Bahrain	0–0	Jordan	Riffa, Bahrain
19:00 UTC+3		Report		Stadium: Bahrain National Stadium

5 September 2017 2019 Asian Cup qualification	Bahrain	5–0	Chinese Taipei	Riffa, Bahrain
19:00 UTC+3	Al-Aswad 11'; Madan 45+4'; Abduljabbar 56', 89'; Helal 74'	Report		Stadium: Bahrain National Stadium; Attendance: 362; Referee: Nagor Amir Noor Mohamed (Malaysia)

10 October 2017 2019 Asian Cup qualification	Chinese Taipei	2–1	Bahrain	Taipei, Taiwan
18:00 UTC+8	Chen Po-liang 90'; Chu En-le 90+2'	Report	Abdullatif 17' (pen.)	Stadium: Taipei Municipal Stadium; Attendance: 7,908; Referee: Hiroyuki Kimura (Japan)

9 November 2017 Friendly	Hong Kong	0–2	Bahrain	Mong Kok, Hong Kong
14:00 UTC+8		Report		Stadium: Mong Kok Stadium

14 November 2017 2019 Asian Cup qualification	Singapore	0–3	Bahrain	Singapore
19:30 UTC+8		Report	Abduljabbar 65', 84'; Rashid 81'	Stadium: National Stadium; Attendance: 2,628; Referee: Jarred Gillett (Australia)

18 December 2017 Friendly	Bahrain	0–0	Kuwait	Riffa, Bahrain
17:00 UTC+3		Report		Stadium: Bahrain National Stadium

23 December 2017 2017 Gulf Cup	Bahrain	1–1	Iraq	Kuwait City, Kuwait
20:00 UTC+3	Rashid 79'		Abdul-Raheem 89'	Stadium: Al Kuwait Sports Club Stadium; Referee: Ammar Al-Jeneibi (United Arab Emirates)

26 December 2017 2017 Gulf Cup	Yemen	0–1	Bahrain	Kuwait City, Kuwait
17:30 UTC+3			Rashid 39' (pen.)	Stadium: Al Kuwait Sports Club Stadium; Referee: Sultan Al-Harbi (Saudi Arabia)

29 December 2017 2017 Gulf Cup	Qatar	1–1	Bahrain	Kuwait City, Kuwait
18:30 UTC+3	Al-Haydos 45+5' (pen.)		Madan 57'	Stadium: Jaber International Stadium; Referee: Aziz Asimov (Uzbekistan)

=== 2018 ===
2 January 2018 2017 Gulf Cup	Oman	1–0	Bahrain	Kuwait City, Kuwait
17:15 UTC+3	Abduljabbar 29' (o.g.)	Report		Stadium: Jaber International Stadium; Referee: Hettikamkanamge Perera (Sri Lanka)

22 March 2018 Friendly	Bahrain	0–0	Palestine	Riffa, Bahrain
18:00 UTC+3		Report		Stadium: Bahrain National Stadium; Referee: Ali Shaban (Kuwait)

27 March 2018 2019 AFC Asian Cup qualification	Bahrain	4–0	Turkmenistan	Riffa, Bahrain
19:00 UTC+3	Helal 12', 24'; Issa 64'; Yaser 67'	Report		Stadium: Bahrain National Stadium; Attendance: 100; Referee: Yaqoob Abdul Baki (Oman)

6 September 2018 Friendly	Bahrain	1–1	Philippines	Riffa, Bahrain
19:00 UTC+3	Issa 90+7'	Report	P. Younghusband 49' (pen.)	Stadium: Bahrain National Stadium; Referee: Hamad Ali Yousef (United Arab Emirates)

10 September 2018 Friendly	Bahrain	0–0	China	Riffa, Bahrain
19:00 UTC+3		Report		Stadium: Bahrain National Stadium; Referee: Ahmed Al Ali (Jordan)

11 October 2018 Friendly	Bahrain	0–1	Syria	Riffa, Bahrain
19:15 UTC+3		Report	Al Somah 30'	Stadium: Bahrain National Stadium; Referee: Mohammad Arafah (Jordan)

16 October 2018 Friendly	Bahrain	4–1	Myanmar	Riffa, Bahrain
22:45 (UTC+6:30)	Rashid 45+1' (pen.); Marhoon 48', 69'; Issa 70'	Report	Myat Kaung Khant 52'	Stadium: Bahrain National Stadium; Referee: Khalid Al-Turais (Saudi Arabia)

15 November 2018 Friendly	Kuwait	Cancelled	Bahrain	Kuwait City, Kuwait
18:00 (AST)		Report		Stadium: Jaber International Stadium; Referee: Sultan Abdulrazaq Al Marzouqi (United Arab Emirates)
Note: The match was cancelled due to bad weather conditions.

19 November 2018 Friendly	Oman	2–1	Bahrain	Muscat, Oman
17:30 (UTC+4)	E. Al-Farsi 56'; Al-Yahmadi 90'	Report	Al-Humaidan 68'	Stadium: Sultan Qaboos Sports Complex; Referee: Hussein Abo Yehia (Lebanon)

20 December 2018 Friendly	Bahrain	5–0	Tajikistan	Isa Town, Bahrain
14:00 (UTC+3)	Al Romaihi 29'; Rashid 43' (pen.), 75'; Madan 61'; Al-Husaini 85'	Report		Stadium: Khalifa Sports City Stadium; Attendance: 20; Referee: Ammar Ashkanani (Kuwait)

27 December 2018 Friendly	Bahrain	1–0	Lebanon	Riffa, Bahrain
20:00 (UTC+3)	Habib (pen.)	Report		Stadium: Bahrain National Stadium

29 December 2018 Friendly	Bahrain	4–0	North Korea	Isa Town, Bahrain
20:00 (UTC+3)		Report		Stadium: Khalifa Sports City Stadium; Referee: Omar Al Yaqoubi (Oman)

=== 2019 ===
5 January 2019 2019 Asian Cup	United Arab Emirates	1–1	Bahrain	Abu Dhabi, United Arab Emirates
20:00 UTC+4	Khalil 88' (pen.)	Report	Al Romaihi 78'	Stadium: Zayed Sports City Stadium; Attendance: 33,878; Referee: Adham Makhadmeh (Jordan)

10 January 2019 2019 Asian Cup	Bahrain	0–1	Thailand	Dubai, United Arab Emirates
15:00 UTC+4		Report	Chanathip 58'	Stadium: Al-Maktoum Stadium; Attendance: 2,720; Referee: Chris Beath (Australia)

14 January 2019 2019 Asian Cup	India	0–1	Bahrain	Sharjah, United Arab Emirates
20:00 UTC+4		Report	Rashid 90+1' (pen.)	Stadium: Sharjah Stadium; Attendance: 11,417; Referee: Ilgiz Tantashev (Uzbekistan)

22 January 2019 2019 Asian Cup	South Korea	2–1 (a.e.t.)	Bahrain	Dubai, United Arab Emirates
17:00 UTC+4	Hwang Hee-chan 43'; Kim Jin-su 105+2'	Report	Al Romaihi 77'	Stadium: Rashid Stadium; Attendance: 7,658; Referee: Ryuji Sato (Japan)

4 August 2019 2019 WAFF	Jordan	0–1	Bahrain	Erbil, Iraq
19:30 (UTC+3)		Report	Abdullatif 69'	Stadium: Franso Hariri Stadium; Attendance: 3,500; Referee: Haitham Al-Walidi (Yemen)

7 August 2019 2019 WAFF	Bahrain	0–0	Saudi Arabia	Erbil, Iraq
19:30 (UTC+3)		Report		Stadium: Franso Hariri Stadium; Referee: Wissam Rabie (Syria)

10 August 2019 2019 WAFF	Kuwait	0–1	Bahrain	Erbil, Iraq
22:30 (UTC+3)		Report	Abdullatif 80'	Stadium: Franso Hariri Stadium; Referee: Wathik Al-Baag (Iraq)

14 August 2019 2019 WAFF	Iraq	0–1	Bahrain	Karbala, Iraq
20:30 (UTC+3)		Report	Moosa 40'	Stadium: Karbala International Stadium; Attendance: 34,500; Referee: Turki Al-Khudhayr (Saudi Arabia)

5 September 2019 2022 World Cup qualification	Bahrain	1–1	Iraq	Riffa, Bahrain
19:30 (UTC+3)	Al Aswad 9'	Report (FIFA); Report (AFC)	M. Ali 86'	Stadium: Bahrain National Stadium; Referee: Omar Al-Yaqoubi (Oman)

10 September 2019 2022 World Cup qualification	Cambodia	0–1	Bahrain	Phnom Penh, Cambodia
18:30 UTC+7		Report (FIFA); Report (AFC)	Al Aswad 78'	Stadium: Phnom Penh Olympic Stadium; Referee: Nivon Robesh Gamini (Sri Lanka)

9 October 2019 Friendly	Bahrain	2–3	Azerbaijan	Riffa, Bahrain
19:30 (AST)	Al-Malood 32'; Al-Shaikh 68'	Report	Dadashov 41'; Khalilzade 62'; Sheydayev 70'	Stadium: Bahrain National Stadium

15 October 2019 2022 World Cup qualification	Bahrain	1–0	Iran	Riffa, Bahrain
19:30 UTC+3	Al-Hardan 65' (pen.)	Report (FIFA); Report (AFC)		Stadium: Bahrain National Stadium; Attendance: 14,810; Referee: Valentin Kovalenko (Uzbekistan)

14 November 2019 2022 World Cup qualification	Hong Kong	0–0	Bahrain	Kowloon, Hong Kong
20:00 UTC+8		Report (FIFA); Report (AFC)		Stadium: Mong Kok Stadium; Attendance: 4,541; Referee: Kim Dong-jin (South Korea)

19 November 2019 2022 World Cup qualification	Iraq	0–0	Bahrain	Amman, Jordan
16:00 UTC+2		Report (FIFA); Report (AFC)		Stadium: Amman International Stadium; Attendance: 10,366; Referee: Muhammad Taqi (Singapore)

27 November 2019 2019 Gulf Cup	Oman	0–0	Bahrain	Doha, Qatar
17:30 UTC+3		Report		Stadium: Abdullah bin Khalifa Stadium; Referee: Alexandre Boucaut (Belgium)

30 November 2019 2019 Gulf Cup	Bahrain	0–2	Saudi Arabia	Doha, Qatar
20:00 UTC+3		Report	Al-Hamdan 29'; Al-Khabrani 58'	Stadium: Abdullah bin Khalifa Stadium; Referee: Lionel Tschudi (Switzerland)

2 December 2019 2019 Gulf Cup	Kuwait	2–4	Bahrain	Doha, Qatar
20:00 UTC+3	Nasser 59' (pen.); Zanki 85'	Report	Madan 45+1'; Al-Shaikh 69'; Thiago Augusto 83', 90+3'	Stadium: Khalifa International Stadium; Referee: Ammar Al-Jeneibi (United Arab Emirates)

5 December 2019 2019 Gulf Cup	Iraq	2–2 (a.e.t.) (3–5 p)	Bahrain	Doha, Qatar
17:00 UTC+3	Ali 6'; Bayesh 18'	Report	Al-Haza'a 14'; Marhoon 45+2'	Stadium: Abdullah bin Khalifa Stadium; Referee: Ryuji Sato (Japan)
	Penalties
	Faez (penalty scored); Ismail (penalty scored); Bayesh (penalty scored); Qasim (penalty missed)		(penalty scored) Al-Hardan; (penalty scored) Al-Shaikh; (penalty scored) Marhoon; (penalty scored) Thiago Augusto; (penalty scored) Madan

8 December 2019 2019 Gulf Cup	Bahrain	1–0	Saudi Arabia	Doha, Qatar
19:00 UTC+3	Al Romaihi 69'	Report		Stadium: Abdullah bin Khalifa Stadium; Referee: Lionel Tschudi (Switzerland)

== Head-to-head records ==
Bahrain national football team head-to-head records (2010–2019)
Opponent	Pld	W	D	L	GF	GA	GD	Pts	Confederation
Australia	1	0	0	1	0	1	–1	0	AFC
Azerbaijan	2	0	0	2	2	6	–4	0	UEFA
Cambodia	1	1	0	0	1	0	+1	3	AFC
China	2	0	2	0	1	1	0	2	AFC
Chinese Taipei	2	1	0	1	6	2	+4	3	AFC
Colombia	1	0	0	1	0	6	–6	0	CONMEBOL
Guinea	1	1	0	0	3	0	+3	3	CAF
Hong Kong	3	2	1	0	6	0	+6	7	AFC
Indonesia	2	2	0	0	12	0	+12	6	AFC
India	2	2	0	0	6	2	+4	6	AFC
Iran	6	1	2	3	2	12	–10	5	AFC
Iraq	11	2	7	2	11	9	+2	13	AFC
Jordan	8	4	2	2	7	4	+3	14	AFC
Japan	1	0	0	1	0	2	–2	0	AFC
Kyrgyzstan	2	0	1	1	1	3	–2	1	AFC
South Korea	2	0	0	2	2	4	–2	0	AFC
Kuwait	13	5	5	3	14	16	–2	20	AFC
Libya	1	0	0	1	1	2	–1	0	CAF
Lebanon	4	3	1	0	4	0	+4	10	AFC
Morocco	1	0	0	1	0	4	–4	0	CAF
Malaysia	2	1	1	0	2	1	+1	4	AFC
Myanmar	1	1	0	0	4	1	+3	3	AFC
Oman	10	1	6	3	7	8	–1	9	AFC
Philippines	6	3	2	1	9	5	+4	11	AFC
Palestine	5	2	1	2	5	4	+1	7	AFC
North Korea	4	1	0	3	4	4	0	3	AFC
Qatar	9	3	6	0	6	3	+3	15	AFC
Saudi Arabia	7	3	1	3	6	7	–1	10	AFC
Sudan	1	1	0	0	1	0	+1	3	CAF
Singapore	4	3	1	0	9	2	+7	10	AFC
Sweden	1	0	0	1	0	2	–2	0	UEFA
Syria	3	0	0	3	1	5	–4	0	AFC
Tajikistan	2	1	1	0	6	1	+5	4	AFC
Thailand	3	0	1	2	1	3	–2	1	AFC
Turkmenistan	2	2	0	0	6	1	+5	6	AFC
United Arab Emirates	6	0	1	5	6	16	–10	1	AFC
Uganda	1	0	1	0	0	0	0	1	CAF
Uzbekistan	5	0	2	3	3	10	–7	2	AFC
Yemen	9	6	1	2	13	5	+8	19	AFC
Total	147	53	46	48	173	153	+20	205	
