= 2019 AFC Asian Cup Group A =

Football tournament group stage

Group A of the 2019 AFC Asian Cup took place from 5 to 14 January 2019. The group consisted of tournament hosts United Arab Emirates, Thailand, India and Bahrain. The top two teams, the United Arab Emirates and Thailand, along with third-placed Bahrain (as one of the four best third-placed teams), advanced to the round of 16.

== Teams ==
Draw position	Team	Zone	Method of qualification	Date of qualification	Finals appearance	Last appearance	Previous best performance	FIFA Rankings	
Draw position	Team	Zone	Method of qualification	Date of qualification	Finals appearance	Last appearance	Previous best performance	April 2018 (Note: The rankings of April 2018 were used for seeding for the final draw.)	December 2018
A1	United Arab Emirates	WAFF	Hosts	9 March 2015	10th	2015 (third place)	Runners-up (1996)	81	79
A2	Thailand	AFF	Second round group F winners	24 March 2016	7th	2007 (group stage)	Third place (1972)	122	118
A3	India	SAFF	Third Round Group A winners	11 October 2017	4th	2011 (group stage)	Runners-up (1964)	97	97
A4	Bahrain	WAFF	Third Round Group E winners	14 November 2017	6th	2015 (group stage)	Fourth place (2004)	116	113

== Standings ==
Pos	Team	Pld	W	D	L	GF	GA	GD	Pts	Qualification
1	United Arab Emirates (H)	3	1	2	0	4	2	+2	5	Advance to knockout stage
2	Thailand	3	1	1	1	3	5	−2	4 (Note: Head-to-head points: Thailand 3, Bahrain 0.)	Advance to knockout stage
3	Bahrain	3	1	1	1	2	2	0	4	Advance to knockout stage
4	India	3	1	0	2	4	4	0	3	

Source: AFC
Rules for classification: Group stage tiebreakers
(H) Hosts
Notes:

In the round of 16:

- The winners of Group A, the United Arab Emirates, advanced to play the third-placed team of Group C, Kyrgyzstan.
- The runners-up of Group A, Thailand, advanced to play the runners-up of Group C, China PR.
- The third-placed team of Group A, Bahrain, advanced to play the winners of Group C, South Korea (as one of the four best third-placed teams).

== Matches ==
All times listed are GST (UTC+4).

=== United Arab Emirates vs Bahrain ===
With six minutes played, Ali Mabkhout found Ismail Al Hammadi, who fired narrowly wide of Bahrain goalkeeper Sayed Shubbar Alawi’s far post. Mabkhout shot over the bar from 15 yards after an Ali Salmeen cross on 23 minutes. In the final moments of the first half, Kamil Al Aswad's free kick from 25 yards narrowly whizzed over the bar. Khalid Eisa then made a double save to deny Bahrain in the 52nd minute by first palming away Ali Madan’s drive and blocking Mohamed Al Romaihi’s subsequent follow-up. Eight minutes after the hour mark, Bahrain failed to clear the lines at a corner and the ball was eventually deflected into the path of Mabkhout, who shot just wide of the post. On 78 minutes, defender Sayed Redha Isa crossed to Al Romaihi, who saw his initial header cleared off the line before ramming home the rebound. Bahraini substitute Mohamed Marhoon, who had only just come on, handled the ball in the area on 88 minutes and Ahmed Khalil, having come off the bench for his 100th cap, scored the resulting penalty to ensure his side a point.

5 January 2019
20:00

United Arab Emirates	1–1	Bahrain
Khalil 88' (pen.)	Report	Al Romaihi 78'

Zayed Sports City Stadium, Abu Dhabi
Attendance: 33,878
Referee: Adham Makhadmeh (Jordan)

United Arab Emirates	Bahrain

GK	17	Khalid Eisa
RB	9	Bandar Al-Ahbabi
CB	4	Khalifa Mubarak
CB	6	Fares Juma (c)
LB	18	Al Hassan Saleh
CM	13	Khamis Esmaeel	(yellow card) 36'	(substituted off) 81'
CM	2	Ali Salmeen
CM	5	Amer Abdulrahman	(yellow card) 35'	(substituted off) 54'
RF	21	Khalfan Mubarak		(substituted off) 54'
CF	7	Ali Mabkhout
LF	15	Ismail Al Hammadi
Substitutions:
FW	20	Saif Rashid		(substituted on) 54'
MF	16	Mohamed Abdulrahman		(substituted on) 54'
FW	11	Ahmed Khalil		(substituted on) 81'
Manager:
(Italy) Alberto Zaccheroni

GK	1	Sayed Shubbar Alawi
RB	5	Hamad Al-Shamsan
CB	16	Sayed Redha Isa
CB	3	Waleed Al Hayam
LB	12	Ahmed Juma	(substituted off) 87'
RM	7	Abdulwahab Al-Safi (c)
CM	4	Sayed Dhiya Saeed
CM	11	Ali Madan	(substituted off) 90+3'
LM	19	Kamil Al Aswad
CF	23	Jamal Rashid	(substituted off) 81'
CF	13	Mohamed Al Romaihi
Substitutions:
FW	10	Abdulla Yusuf Helal	(substituted on) 81'
MF	8	Mohamed Marhoon	(substituted on) 87'
FW	20	Sami Al-Husaini	(substituted on) 90+3'
Manager:
(Czech Republic) Miroslav Soukup

Man of the Match:
Mohamed Al Romaihi (Bahrain)

Assistant referees:
Ahmad Al-Roalle (Jordan)
Mohammad Al-Kalaf (Jordan)
Fourth official:
Mohammed Al-Abakry (Saudi Arabia)
Additional assistant referees:
Turki Al-Khudhayr (Saudi Arabia)
Ahmed Al-Ali (Jordan)

=== Thailand vs India ===
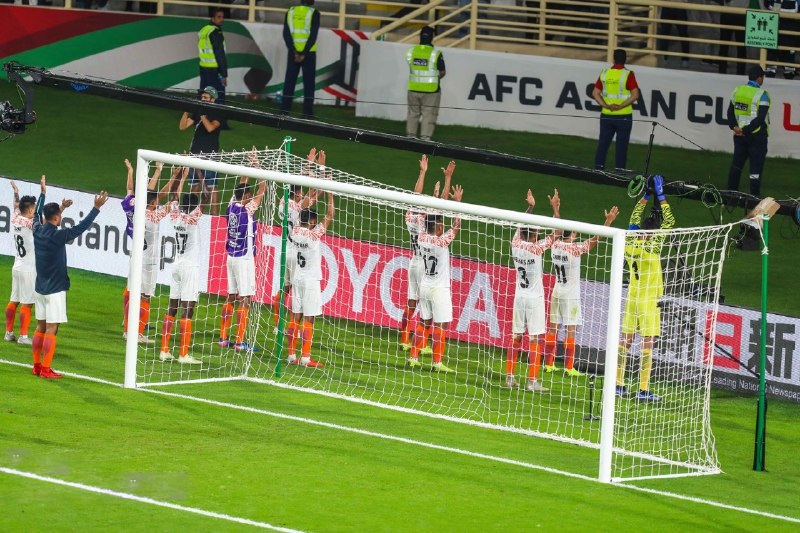
Indian players celebrating with fans after the match

Thailand threatened first with captain Teerasil Dangda finding Thitipan Puangchan, firing an 11th minute drive which sailed narrowly wide of Indian goalkeeper Gurpreet Singh Sandhu’s right-hand post. Later on, Ashique Kuruniyan’s shot was saved by Chatchai Budprom, only for defender Theerathon Bunmathan to concede a penalty when he handled the subsequent rebound. Sunil Chhetri converted the resulting penalty to give India the lead in the 27th minute. Thailand were, however, to draw level just six minutes later, with Teerasil heading home Theerathon’s delivered set-piece. Moments after the restart, Kuruniyan and Udanta Singh combined to set up Chhetri who fired home past Chatchai from 15 yards to restore his side’s advantage. In the 68th minute Udanta charged towards the goal before laying the ball back to Anirudh Thapa, who dinked the ball past both Chatchai and a recovering defender into the back of the net. With time running out, Thailand rallied briefly when Teerasil saw a goal-bound effort diverted to safety via the outstretched leg of the defender Anas Edathodika. With 10 minutes remaining, substitute Jeje Lalpekhlua scored a curling strike from the edge of the area.

This became India's biggest ever win in their Asian Cup history, while it was also India's first ever win after 55 years. This hammered defeat to India prompted the FAT to sack Milovan Rajevac and appointed Sirisak Yodyardthai as interim coach. The two goals helped Sunil Chhetri overtake Lionel Messi to become the second-highest active goalscorer in men's international football, behind Cristiano Ronaldo.

6 January 2019
17:30

Thailand	1–4	India
Teerasil 33'	Report	Chhetri 27' (pen.), 46'; Thapa 68'; Lalpekhlua 80'

Al Nahyan Stadium, Abu Dhabi
Attendance: 3,250
Referee: Liu Kwok Man (Hong Kong)

Thailand	India

GK	1	Chatchai Budprom
RB	19	Tristan Do
CB	4	Chalermpong Kerdkaew
CB	6	Pansa Hemviboon	(yellow card) 79'
LB	3	Theerathon Bunmathan
CM	8	Thitipan Puangchan
CM	14	Sanrawat Dechmitr	(yellow card) 39'	(substituted off) 58'
RW	9	Adisak Kraisorn		(substituted off) 79'
AM	18	Chanathip Songkrasin		(substituted off) 73'
LW	22	Supachai Jaided
CF	10	Teerasil Dangda (c)
Substitutions:
DF	11	Korrakot Wiriyaudomsiri		(substituted on) 58'
FW	20	Siroch Chatthong		(substituted on) 73'
MF	7	Sumanya Purisai		(substituted on) 79'
Manager:
(Serbia) Milovan Rajevac

GK	1	Gurpreet Singh Sandhu (c)
RB	20	Pritam Kotal
CB	5	Sandesh Jhingan
CB	22	Anas Edathodika
LB	3	Subhasish Bose
RM	15	Udanta Singh
CM	7	Anirudh Thapa	(substituted off) 78'
CM	14	Pronay Halder	(substituted off) 87'
LM	19	Halicharan Narzary
CF	13	Ashique Kuruniyan	(substituted off) 78'
CF	11	Sunil Chhetri
Substitutions:
FW	12	Jeje Lalpekhlua	(substituted on) 78'
MF	17	Rowllin Borges	(substituted on) 78'
MF	6	Germanpreet Singh	(substituted on) 87'
Manager:
(England) Stephen Constantine

Man of the Match:
Sunil Chhetri (India)

Assistant referees:
Huo Weiming (China PR)
Cao Yi (China PR)
Fourth official:
Ronnie Koh Min Kiat (Singapore)
Additional assistant referees:
Ma Ning (China PR)
Fu Ming (China PR)

=== Bahrain vs Thailand ===
Thailand came close to opening the scoring in the 20th minute when captain Teerasil Dangda's effort was blocked by Bahraini goalkeeper Sayed Shubbar Alawi. Eight minutes later, Bahrain forced Thai goalkeeper Siwarak Tedsungnoen to pull off a double save against Mohamed Marhoon and Sayed Dhiya Saeed. Four minutes from the end of the half, Mohamed Al Romaihi failed to keep his header down from Marhoon's cross. In the 58th minute, Tristan Do sent a cross into the Bahrain penalty box. The ball was deflected by Ahmed Juma but a surging Chanathip Songkrasin sent a left-footed shot past Alawi to give Thailand the advantage. Thailand came close to doubling their lead when Chanathip's pass found Adisak Kraisorn but his effort was denied by the upright in the 71st minute.

10 January 2019
15:00

Bahrain	0–1	Thailand
	Report	Chanathip 58'

Al Maktoum Stadium, Dubai
Attendance: 2,720
Referee: Chris Beath (Australia)

Bahrain	Thailand

GK	1	Sayed Shubbar Alawi
RB	16	Sayed Redha Isa
CB	5	Hamad Al-Shamsan
CB	3	Waleed Al Hayam
LB	12	Ahmed Juma	(substituted off) 64'
CM	7	Abdulwahab Al-Safi (c)
CM	19	Kamil Al Aswad
RW	11	Ali Madan	(substituted off) 79'
AM	8	Mohamed Marhoon	(substituted off) 65'
LW	4	Sayed Dhiya Saeed
CF	13	Mohamed Al Romaihi
Substitutions:
FW	20	Sami Al-Husaini	(substituted on) 64'
FW	10	Abdulla Yusuf Helal	(substituted on) 65'
FW	9	Mahdi Al-Humaidan	(substituted on) 79'
Manager:
(Czech Republic) Miroslav Soukup

GK	23	Siwarak Tedsungnoen
CB	5	Adisorn Promrak	(yellow card) 45+1'	(substituted off) 90+2'
CB	6	Pansa Hemviboon	(yellow card) 13'
CB	15	Suphan Thongsong	(yellow card) 20'
LWB	3	Theerathon Bunmathan
RWB	19	Tristan Do
CM	17	Tanaboon Kesarat		(substituted off) 68'
CM	8	Thitipan Puangchan
LW	18	Chanathip Songkrasin
RW	9	Adisak Kraisorn	(yellow card) 43'	(substituted off) 80'
CF	10	Teerasil Dangda (c)
Substitutions:
MF	14	Sanrawat Dechmitr		(substituted on) 68'
FW	22	Supachai Jaided		(substituted on) 80'
DF	16	Mika Chunuonsee		(substituted on) 90+2'
Manager:
Sirisak Yodyardthai

Man of the Match:
Chanathip Songkrasin (Thailand)

Assistant referees:
Matthew Cream (Australia)
Anton Shchetinin (Australia)
Fourth official:
Sergei Grishchenko (Kyrgyzstan)
Additional assistant referees:
Peter Green (Australia)
Ryuji Sato (Japan)

=== India vs United Arab Emirates ===
India had the game's first chance when Ashique Kuruniyan dashed into the area before unleashing a drive which forced goalkeeper Khalid Eisa into a fine save on 11 minutes. Eisa was called into action once again in the 23rd minute, this time reacting to repel a Sunil Chhetri header. Five minutes before half-time, Anas Edathodika made a mess of it and allowed Ali Mabkhout to set up Khalfan Mubarak to fire home past Indian custodian Gurpreet Singh Sandhu. In the final moments of the first period, Chhetri came within inches of drawing his side level, but his effort fizzed just wide of Eisa's far post. After the break, substitute Jeje Lalpekhlua fired a shot narrowly off target and then Udanta Singh rattled the Emirati bar with a drive from a narrow angle. Ismail Al Hammadi’s 74th-minute shot cannoned off the post and then Sandhu before rebounding to safety. The UAE doubled their advantage in the final moments when Mabkhout converted Ali Salmeen’s pass to secure the victory despite Mohamed Ahmed crashing the ball against his own woodwork deep into stoppage time.

10 January 2019
20:00

India	0–2	United Arab Emirates
	Report	Khalf. Mubarak 41'; Mabkhout 88'

Zayed Sports City Stadium, Abu Dhabi
Attendance: 43,206
Referee: César Ramos (Mexico)

India	United Arab Emirates

GK	1	Gurpreet Singh Sandhu
RB	20	Pritam Kotal
CB	5	Sandesh Jhingan
CB	22	Anas Edathodika
LB	3	Subhasish Bose	(yellow card) 73'
RM	15	Udanta Singh		(substituted off) 79'
CM	7	Anirudh Thapa		(substituted off) 70'
CM	14	Pronay Halder
LM	19	Halicharan Narzary		(substituted off) 46'
CF	13	Ashique Kuruniyan	(yellow card) 51'
CF	11	Sunil Chhetri (c)
Substitutions:
FW	12	Jeje Lalpekhlua		(substituted on) 46'
MF	17	Rowllin Borges		(substituted on) 70'
MF	18	Jackichand Singh		(substituted on) 79'
Manager:
(England) Stephen Constantine

GK	17	Khalid Eisa
RB	9	Bandar Al-Ahbabi
CB	4	Khalifa Mubarak
CB	19	Ismail Ahmed
LB	18	Al Hassan Saleh
CM	13	Khamis Esmaeel	(substituted off) 63'
CM	2	Ali Salmeen
CM	5	Amer Abdulrahman	(substituted off) 75'
RF	21	Khalfan Mubarak	(substituted off) 85'
CF	7	Ali Mabkhout
LF	15	Ismail Al Hammadi (c)
Substitutions:
MF	8	Majed Hassan	(substituted on) 63'
DF	23	Mohamed Ahmed	(substituted on) 75'
FW	10	Ismail Matar	(substituted on) 85'
Manager:
(Italy) Alberto Zaccheroni

Man of the Match:
Ali Mabkhout (United Arab Emirates)

Assistant referees:
Miguel Hernández (Mexico)
Alberto Morín (Mexico)
Fourth official:
Rashid Al-Ghaithi (Oman)
Additional assistant referees:
Jumpei Iida (Japan)
Hiroyuki Kimura (Japan)

=== United Arab Emirates vs Thailand ===
The United Arab Emirates and Thailand both booked their places in the knockout stage as a 1–1 draw at the Hazza bin Zayed Stadium was enough to ensure both nations progressed. Ali Mabkhout put Alberto Zaccheroni's side ahead after seven minutes but Thitipan Puangchan struck four minutes from time to earn the Thais a point that sees them take second place in Group A, following India's late loss to Bahrain, thanks to a better head-to-head record.

The hosts made the perfect start when, with many in the crowd of almost 18,000 still finding their seats, they found the back of Siwarak Tedsungnoen's goal. Ismail Al Hammadi burst into the area and attempted to clip the ball over the Thai keeper, only for it to come back off the crossbar. However, Mabkhout rose to head home the rebound from inside the six-yard box. Khalfan Mubarak sought to double the lead 11 minutes later when he twisted his way past the Thai defence, only to send a weak shot trundling through to Siwarak.

While the UAE have qualified for the knockout phase for the second tournament in a row, Thailand will be featuring in the next round for the first time since they reached the semi-finals in 1972.

14 January 2019
20:00

United Arab Emirates	1–1	Thailand
Mabkhout 7'	Report	Thitipan 41'

Hazza bin Zayed Stadium, Al Ain
Attendance: 17,809
Referee: Ryuji Sato (Japan)

United Arab Emirates	Thailand

GK	17	Khalid Eisa
CB	19	Ismail Ahmed
CB	4	Khalifa Mubarak
CB	23	Mohamed Ahmed
RWB	9	Bandar Al-Ahbabi		(substituted off) 46'
LWB	18	Al Hassan Saleh	(yellow card) 34'
CM	8	Majed Hassan
CM	2	Ali Salmeen
RW	21	Khalfan Mubarak		(substituted off) 84'
LW	15	Ismail Al Hammadi (c)		(substituted off) 74'
CF	7	Ali Mabkhout
Substitutions:
MF	16	Mohamed Abdulrahman		(substituted on) 46'
FW	11	Ahmed Khalil		(substituted on) 74'
FW	10	Ismail Matar		(substituted on) 84'
Manager:
(Italy) Alberto Zaccheroni

GK	23	Siwarak Tedsungnoen
RB	3	Theerathon Bunmathan
CB	5	Adisorn Promrak	(yellow card) 7'
CB	15	Suphan Thongsong	(yellow card) 79'
LB	16	Mika Chunuonsee		(substituted off) 31'
CM	17	Tanaboon Kesarat		(substituted off) 90'
CM	8	Thitipan Puangchan
RW	19	Tristan Do
LW	18	Chanathip Songkrasin
CF	9	Adisak Kraisorn		(substituted off) 64'
CF	10	Teerasil Dangda (c)
Substitutions:
DF	4	Chalermpong Kerdkaew		(substituted on) 31'
FW	22	Supachai Jaided		(substituted on) 64'
MF	21	Pokklaw Anan		(substituted on) 90'
Manager:
Sirisak Yodyardthai

Man of the Match:
Ali Mabkhout (United Arab Emirates)

Assistant referees:
Hiroshi Yamauchi (Japan)
Jun Mihara (Japan)
Fourth official:
Mohd Yusri Muhamad (Malaysia)
Additional assistant referees:
Jumpei Iida (Japan)
Hiroyuki Kimura (Japan)

=== India vs Bahrain ===
Jamal Rashid's penalty in stoppage time sealed the 1–0 win for Bahrain over India, taking them into the knockout stage for the first time since 2004. With the UAE and Thailand playing to a 1–1 draw, Bahrain finished third in Group A with four points, confirming them as one of the best four third-placed teams that will advance to the round of 16.

India suffered early problems at the back when Anas Edathodika was forced off with an injury in the fourth minute and replaced with Salam Ranjan Singh. Bahrain then applied pressure on the Blue Tigers' defence as goalkeeper Gurpreet Singh Sandhu was called into action three minutes later to save Sayed Dhiya Saeed's left footed shot from outside the box. India were able to calm their nerves and responded in the 20th minute. Sunil Chhetri came close to scoring, but the striker failed to steer Gurpreet's long pass home. In the last minutes, Rashid and Saeed both failed to find the mark with long-range efforts, before the former scored the match-deciding penalty.

14 January 2019
20:00

India	0–1	Bahrain
	Report	Rashid 90+1' (pen.)

Sharjah Stadium, Sharjah
Attendance: 11,417
Referee: Ilgiz Tantashev (Uzbekistan)

India	Bahrain

GK	1	Gurpreet Singh Sandhu
RB	20	Pritam Kotal
CB	5	Sandesh Jhingan
CB	22	Anas Edathodika	(substituted off) 4'
LB	3	Subhasish Bose
RM	15	Udanta Singh
CM	17	Rowllin Borges
CM	14	Pronay Halder (c)
LM	19	Halicharan Narzary	(substituted off) 79'
CF	13	Ashique Kuruniyan	(substituted off) 46'
CF	11	Sunil Chhetri
Substitutions:
DF	2	Salam Ranjan Singh	(substituted on) 4'
FW	12	Jeje Lalpekhlua	(substituted on) 46'
MF	7	Anirudh Thapa	(substituted on) 79'
Manager:
(England) Stephen Constantine

GK	1	Sayed Shubbar Alawi
RB	16	Sayed Redha Isa
CB	5	Hamad Al-Shamsan	(yellow card) 64'
CB	3	Waleed Al Hayam
LB	12	Ahmed Juma		(substituted off) 78'
CM	7	Abdulwahab Al-Safi (c)
CM	19	Kamil Al Aswad
RW	11	Ali Madan		(substituted off) 55'
AM	23	Jamal Rashid
LW	4	Sayed Dhiya Saeed
CF	13	Mohamed Al Romaihi		(substituted off) 61'
Substitutions:
MF	8	Mohamed Marhoon		(substituted on) 55'
FW	10	Abdulla Yusuf Helal		(substituted on) 61'
FW	20	Sami Al-Husaini		(substituted on) 78'
Other disciplinary actions:
DF	17	Ahmed Bughammar	(yellow card) 90+5'
Manager:
(Czech Republic) Miroslav Soukup

Man of the Match:
Jamal Rashid (Bahrain)

Assistant referees:
Abdukhamidullo Rasulov (Uzbekistan)
Sergei Grishchenko (Kyrgyzstan)
Fourth official:
Ronnie Koh Min Kiat (Singapore)
Additional assistant referees:
Ravshan Irmatov (Uzbekistan)
Valentin Kovalenko (Uzbekistan)

== Discipline ==
Fair play points were used as tiebreakers if the head-to-head and overall records of teams were tied (and if a penalty shoot-out was not applicable as a tiebreaker). These were calculated based on yellow and red cards received in all group matches as follows:

- yellow card = 1 point
- red card as a result of two yellow cards = 3 points
- direct red card = 3 points
- yellow card followed by direct red card = 4 points

Only one of the above deductions was applied to a player in a single match.

Team	Match 1				Match 2				Match 3				Points
Team	Booked	(yellow card) (yellow-red card)	Sent off (straight red)	(yellow card) (red card)	Booked	(yellow card) (yellow-red card)	Sent off (straight red)	(yellow card) (red card)	Booked	(yellow card) (yellow-red card)	Sent off (straight red)	(yellow card) (red card)	Points
Bahrain									2				−2
India					2								−2
United Arab Emirates	2								1				−3
Thailand	2				4				2				−8
