= United Arab Emirates national football team results (2010–2019) =

This article provides details of international football games played by the United Arab Emirates national football team from 2010 to 2019.

== Results ==
Key
| Win |
| Draw |
| Defeat |

=== 2010 ===
| 6 January 2010 2011 Asian Cup Qualification | United Arab Emirates | 1–0 | Malaysia | Dubai, United Arab Emirates |
| 19:00 UTC+4 | Khalil 90+3' | Report | | Stadium: Maktoum bin Rashid Al Maktoum Stadium; Attendance: 3,500; Referee: Muhsen Basma (Syria) |

| 3 March 2010 2011 Asian Cup Qualification | Uzbekistan | 0–1 | United Arab Emirates | Tashkent, Uzbekistan |
| 17:00 UTC+5 | | Report | Al Menhali 90+2' | Stadium: Pakhtakor Central Stadium; Attendance: 20,000; Referee: Tayeb Shamsuzzaman (Bangladesh) |

| 29 May 2010 Friendly | Moldova | 2–3 | United Arab Emirates | Anif, Austria |
| 19:00 UTC+2 | Țîgîrlaș 14'; Bulgaru 80' | Report | Jumaa 25'; Al-Shehhi 31'; Khalil 89' | Stadium: Sportzentrum Anif; Referee: Robert Schörgenhofer (Austria) |

| 5 June 2010 Friendly | Algeria | 1–0 | United Arab Emirates | Nuremberg, Germany |
| 20:00 UTC+2 | Ziani 51' (pen.) | Report | | Stadium: Max-Morlock-Stadion; Referee: Manuel Gräfe (Germany) |

| 7 September 2010 Friendly | United Arab Emirates | 3–0 | Kuwait | Abu Dhabi, United Arab Emirates |
| 22:00 UTC+4 | Khalil 22'; Matar 40'; Awana 90+3' | Report | | Stadium: Al Nahyan Stadium |

| 9 October 2010 Friendly | United Arab Emirates | 0–2 | Chile | Abu Dhabi, United Arab Emirates |
| 20:30 UTC+4 | | Report | Cereceda 6'; Morales 36' | Stadium: Zayed Sports City Stadium; Referee: Khalil Al Ghamdi (Saudi Arabia) |

| 12 October 2010 Friendly | United Arab Emirates | 0–2 | Angola | Abu Dhabi, United Arab Emirates |
| 19:00 UTC+4 | | Report | Rasca 25'; Vado 89' | Stadium: Zayed Sports City Stadium |

| 18 November 2010 Friendly | United Arab Emirates | 5–0 | India | Dubai, United Arab Emirates |
| 18:45 UTC+4 | Jassim 15'; Mubarak 35'; Al-Wehaibi 60', 72'; Jumaa 70' | Report | | Stadium: Zabeel Stadium |

| 23 November 2010 2010 Gulf Cup | Iraq | 0–0 | United Arab Emirates | Aden, Yemen |
| 19:00 UTC+3 | | Report | | Stadium: 22 May Stadium; Referee: Abdelrahman Al Qathani (Saudi Arabia) |

| 26 November 2010 2010 Gulf Cup | United Arab Emirates | 0–0 | Oman | Aden, Yemen |
| 16:00 UTC+3 | | Report | | Stadium: 22 May Stadium; Referee: Hamdy Raaban (Egypt) |

| 29 November 2010 2010 Gulf Cup | United Arab Emirates | 3–1 | Bahrain | Aden, Yemen |
| 19:00 UTC+3 | Khater 4'; F. Jumaa 8'; A. Juma 64' | Report | Fatadi 35' | Stadium: 22 May Stadium; Referee: Khamis Al Marry (Qatar) |

| 2 December 2010 2010 Gulf Cup | United Arab Emirates | 0–1 | Saudi Arabia | Aden, Yemen |
| 20:00 UTC+3 | | Report | Abbas 55' | Stadium: 22 May Stadium; Referee: Kenji Ogiya (Japan) |

=== 2011 ===
| 2 January 2011 Friendly | United Arab Emirates | 2–0 | Syria | Al Ain, United Arab Emirates |
| 18:30 UTC+4 | Al-Kathiri 64'; Awana 89' | Report | | Stadium: Khalifa bin Zayed Stadium |

| 5 January 2011 Friendly | United Arab Emirates | 0–0 | Australia | Al Ain, United Arab Emirates |
| 18:30 UTC+4 | | Report | | Stadium: Khalifa bin Zayed Stadium |

| 11 January 2011 2011 Asian Cup | North Korea | 0–0 | United Arab Emirates | Doha, Qatar |
| 16:15 UTC+3 | | | | Stadium: Suheim bin Hamad Stadium; Attendance: 3,639; Referee: Subkhiddin Mohd Salleh (Malaysia) |

| 15 January 2011 2011 Asian Cup | United Arab Emirates | 0–1 | Iraq | Al Rayyan, Qatar |
| 19:15 UTC+3 | | Report | Abbas 90+3' (o.g.) | Stadium: Ahmed bin Ali Stadium; Attendance: 7,233; Referee: Yuichi Nishimura (Japan) |

| 19 January 2011 2011 Asian Cup | United Arab Emirates | 0–3 | Iran | Doha, Qatar |
| 19:15 UTC+3 | | Report | Afshin 67'; Nouri 83'; Abbas 90+3' (o.g.) | Stadium: Suheim bin Hamad Stadium; Attendance: 5,012; Referee: Kim Dong-jin (South Korea) |

| 17 July 2011 Friendly | United Arab Emirates | 6–2 | Lebanon | Al Ain, United Arab Emirates |
| 20:00 UTC+4 | Khalil 8', 18', 54'; Al-Shehhi 22'; Al-Kamali 44' (pen.); Awana 80' (pen.) | Report | El Ali 29', 66' | Stadium: Khalifa bin Zayed Stadium |

| 23 July 2011 2014 FIFA World Cup Qualification | United Arab Emirates | 3–0 | India | Al Ain, United Arab Emirates |
| 20:00 UTC+4 | Al-Kamali 21' (pen.); Al-Shehhi 29' (pen.); Al Hammadi 81' | Report | | Stadium: Khalifa bin Zayed Stadium; Attendance: 3,179; Referee: Banjar Al-Dosari (Qatar) |

| 28 July 2011 2014 FIFA World Cup Qualification | India | 2–2 | United Arab Emirates | New Delhi, India |
| 19:00 UTC+5:30 | Lalpekhlua 74'; Singh 90+2' | Report | Al-Shehhi 40'; Al-Wehaibi 72' | Stadium: Ambedkar Stadium; Attendance: 13,000; Referee: Abdul Bashir (Singapore) |

| 25 August 2011 Friendly | United Arab Emirates | 3–1 | Qatar | Al Ain, United Arab Emirates |
| 22:30 UTC+4 | Al-Kamal 24' (pen.); Khalil 60', 68' | Report | Marcone 88' | Stadium: Tahnoun bin Mohammed Stadium |

| 2 September 2011 2014 FIFA World Cup Qualification | United Arab Emirates | 2–3 | Kuwait | Al Ain, United Arab Emirates |
| 19:30 UTC+4 | Al Hammadi 84'; Khalil 89' | Report | Nasser 7', 65'; Al-Mutawa 51' | Stadium: Tahnoun bin Mohammed Stadium; Attendance: 8,715; Referee: Muhsen Basma (Syria) |

| 6 September 2011 2014 FIFA World Cup Qualification | Lebanon | 3–1 | United Arab Emirates | Beirut, Lebanon |
| 17:00 UTC+3 | Ghaddar 37' (pen.); Moghrabi 52'; Antar 83' | Report | Khamees 16' | Stadium: Camille Chamoun Sports City Stadium; Attendance: 4,000; Referee: Alireza Faghani (Iran) |

| 6 October 2011 Friendly | China | 2–1 | United Arab Emirates | Shenzhen, China |
| 15:00 UTC+9 | Xiang 6'; Lin 15' | Report | Ahmed 87' | Stadium: Shenzhen Stadium |

| 11 October 2011 2014 FIFA World Cup Qualification | South Korea | 2–1 | United Arab Emirates | Suwon, South Korea |
| 15:00 UTC+9 | Chu-young 55'; Al-Kamali 64' (o.g.) | Report | Matar 90+2' | Stadium: Suwon World Cup Stadium; Attendance: 28,689; Referee: Tan Hai (China) |

| 11 November 2011 2014 FIFA World Cup Qualification | United Arab Emirates | 0–2 | South Korea | Dubai, United Arab Emirates |
| 16:45 UTC+4 | | Report | Keun-ho 88'; Chu-young 90+3' | Stadium: Rashid Stadium; Attendance: 8,272; Referee: Ravshan Irmatov (Uzbekistan) |

| 15 November 2011 2014 FIFA World Cup Qualification | Kuwait | 2–1 | United Arab Emirates | Kuwait City, Kuwait |
| 18:30 UTC+3 | Al Enezi 50'; Abbas 68' (o.g.) | Report | Matar 19' | Stadium: Al-Sadaqua Walsalam Stadium; Attendance: 10,000; Referee: Abdullah Al Hilali (Oman) |

=== 2012 ===
| 29 January 2012 Friendly | United Arab Emirates | 1–0 | Uzbekistan | Dubai, United Arab Emirates |
| 18:30 UTC+4 | Qasem 0' | Report | | Stadium: Maktoum bin Rashid Al Maktoum Stadium |

| 24 February 2012 Friendly | United Arab Emirates | 3–0 | Palestine | Abu Dhabi, United Arab Emirates |
| 16:00 UTC+4 | Obaid 4'; Jaber 12' (pen.); Nasser 90' (pen.) | Report | | Stadium: Al Nahyan Stadium |

| 29 February 2012 2014 FIFA World Cup Qualification | United Arab Emirates | 4–2 | Lebanon | Abu Dhabi, United Arab Emirates |
| 16:00 UTC+4 | Saeed 20', 78'; Al-Wehaibi 38'; Matar 68' | Report | El Ali 23'; Maatouk 45+2' | Stadium: Al Nahyan Stadium; Attendance: 10,000; Referee: Peter Green (Australia) |

| 6 September 2012 Friendly | Japan | 1–0 | United Arab Emirates | Niigata, Japan |
| 18:30 UTC+9 | Havenaar 69' | Report | | Stadium: Denka Big Swan Stadium; Referee: Ma Ning (China) |

| 11 September 2012 Friendly | United Arab Emirates | 3–0 | Kuwait | Dubai, United Arab Emirates |
| 19:30 UTC+4 | Al-Kathiri 35'; Al Fardan 76'; Abbas 84' | Report | | Stadium: Rashid Stadium |

| 12 October 2012 Friendly | United Arab Emirates | 2–2 | Uzbekistan | Dubai, United Arab Emirates |
| 18:30 UTC+4 | Matar 28'; Al-Kathiri 61' | Report | Djeparov 45'; Tursnov 66' | Stadium: Maktoum bin Rashid Al Maktoum Stadium |

| 16 October 2012 Friendly | United Arab Emirates | 6–2 | Bahrain | Dubai, United Arab Emirates |
| 18:00 UTC+4 | Mabkhout 19', 39', 53', 65'; Al-Kamali 51' (pen.); Abdulrahman 87' | Report | Abdullatif 6' (pen.); Baba 27' | Stadium: Zabeel Stadium |

| 14 November 2012 Friendly | United Arab Emirates | 2–1 | Estonia | Abu Dhabi, United Arab Emirates |
| 19:30 UTC+4 | Al-Kamali 30' (pen.); Mabkhout 70' | Report | Ahjupera 45' | Stadium: Mohammed bin Zayed Stadium; Referee: Sami Al Nemri (Saudi Arabia) |

=== 2013 ===
| 5 January 2013 2013 Gulf Cup | Qatar | 1–3 | United Arab Emirates | Isa Town, Bahrain |
| 21:15 UTC+3 | Ibrahim 11' (pen.) | Report | Abdulrahman 13'; Mabkhout 29'; Ahmed 66' | Stadium: Khalifa Sports City Stadium; Attendance: 20,000; Referee: Khalil Al Ghamdi (Saudi Arabia) |

| 8 January 2013 2013 Gulf Cup | Bahrain | 1–2 | United Arab Emirates | Riffa, Bahrain |
| 19:15 UTC+3 | Al-Malood 75' | Report | Mabkhout 40'; Hassan 85' | Stadium: Bahrain National Stadium; Attendance: 35,000; Referee: Ali Sabah (Iraq) |

| 11 January 2013 2013 Gulf Cup | United Arab Emirates | 2–0 | Oman | Isa Town, Bahrain |
| 17:45 UTC+3 | Khalil 83', 86' | Report | | Stadium: Khalifa Sports City Stadium; Attendance: 7,000; Referee: Yousef Al-Marzouq (Kuwait) |

| 15 January 2013 2013 Gulf Cup | United Arab Emirates | 1–0 | Kuwait | Riffa, Bahrain |
| 16:15 UTC+3 | Khalil 89' | Report | | Stadium: Bahrain National Stadium; Attendance: 30,000; Referee: Abdullah Al Hilali (Oman) |

| 18 January 2013 2013 Gulf Cup | United Arab Emirates | 2–1 (a.e.t.) | Iraq | Riffa, Bahrain |
| 19:00 UTC+3 | Abdulrahman 28'; Al Hammadi 107' | Report | Mahmoud 58'; Younis Mahmoud | Stadium: Bahrain National Stadium; Attendance: 35,000; Referee: Khalil Al Ghamdi (Saudi Arabia) |

| 6 February 2013 2015 Asian Cup Qualification | Vietnam | 1–2 | United Arab Emirates | Hanoi, Vietnam |
| 18:00 UTC+7 | Quốc Anh 16' | Report | Khalil 58'; Al Fardan 67' | Stadium: Mỹ Đình National Stadium; Attendance: 7,200; Referee: Tan Hai (China) |

| 22 March 2013 2015 Asian Cup Qualification | United Arab Emirates | 2–1 | Uzbekistan | Abu Dhabi, United Arab Emirates |
| 17:45 UTC+4 | Khalil 58'; Mabkhout 61' | Report | Gadoyev 16' | Stadium: Mohammed bin Zayed Stadium; Attendance: 21,357; Referee: Tan Hai (China) |

| 5 September 2013 OSN Cup | United Arab Emirates | 3–3 (7–6 p) | Trinidad and Tobago | Riyadh, Saudi Arabia |
| 18:00 UTC+3 | Al Fardan 5'; Mabkhout 37'; Khalil 54' | Report | Plaza 55'; Jones 87' (pen.); Molino 90+2' | Stadium: King Fahd International Stadium; Referee: Fahad Al Oraini (Saudi Arabia) |

| 9 September 2013 OSN Cup | United Arab Emirates | 2–0 | New Zealand | Riyadh, Saudi Arabia |
| 18:00 UTC+3 | Khalil 11'; Mabkhout 56' | Report | | Stadium: King Fahd International Stadium; Referee: Fahad Al Mirdasi (Saudi Arabia) |

| 15 October 2013 Friendly | Hong Kong | 0–4 | United Arab Emirates | Causeway Bay, Hong Kong |
| 20:00 UTC+8 | | Report | Mabkhout 30', 55', 90'; Abbas 90+5' | Stadium: Hong Kong Stadium; Attendance: 7,923; Referee: Kim Jong-hyeok (South Korea) |

| 9 November 2013 Friendly | United Arab Emirates | 4–0 | Philippines | Abu Dhabi, United Arab Emirates |
| 18:30 UTC+4 | Saleh 18'; Abbas 39'; Matar 60'; Mabkhout 78' | Report | | Stadium: Al Nahyan Stadium; Referee: Fahad Al Mirdasi (Saudi Arabia) |

| 15 November 2013 2015 Asian Cup Qualification | United Arab Emirates | 4–0 | Hong Kong | Abu Dhabi, United Arab Emirates |
| 19:30 UTC+4 | Saleh 27'; Abbas 40'; Abdulrahman 80'; Al Hammadi 88' | Report | | Stadium: Mohammed bin Zayed Stadium; Attendance: 10,871; Referee: Alireza Faghani (Iran) |

| 19 November 2013 2015 Asian Cup Qualification | United Arab Emirates | 5–0 | Vietnam | Abu Dhabi, United Arab Emirates |
| 19:30 UTC+4 | Abbas 19'; Matar 25'; Mabkhout 31', 37'; Khalil 90+2' | Report | | Stadium: Mohammed bin Zayed Stadium; Attendance: 9,674; Referee: Ryuji Sato (Japan) |

=== 2014 ===
| 5 March 2014 2015 Asian Cup Qualification | Uzbekistan | 1–1 | United Arab Emirates | Tashkent, Uzbekistan |
| 17:00 UTC+5 | Sergeyev 85' | Report | Al Hammadi 67' | Stadium: Milliy Stadium; Attendance: 15,000; Referee: Kim Sang-woo (South Korea) |

| 27 May 2014 Friendly | United Arab Emirates | 3–4 | Armenia | Carouge, Switzerland |
| 21:00 UTC+2 | Al Hammadi 40'; Abdulrahman 52'; Salem 85' | Report | Hayrapetyan 37'; Mkhitaryan 42', 67'; Hovsepyan 71' | Stadium: Stade de la Fontenette; Referee: Adrien Jaccottet (Switzerland) |

| 3 June 2014 Friendly | United Arab Emirates | 1–0 | Georgia | Meyrin, Switzerland |
| 21:00 UTC+2 | Al Fardan 74' | Report | | Stadium: Stade des Arbères; Referee: Stéphan Studer (Switzerland) |

| 27 August 2014 Friendly | Norway | 0–0 | United Arab Emirates | Stavanger, Norway |
| 20:30 UTC+2 | | Report | | Stadium: Viking Stadion; Referee: Mads-Kristoffer Kristoffersen (Denmark) |

| 3 September 2014 Friendly | Lithuania | 1–1 | United Arab Emirates | Linz, Austria |
| 20:30 UTC+2 | Matulevičius 42' | Report | Sanqour 90+3' | Stadium: Linzer Stadion; Referee: Robert Schörgenhofer (Austria) |

| 7 September 2014 Friendly | Paraguay | 0–0 | United Arab Emirates | Villach, Austria |
| 20:35 UTC+2 | | Report | | Stadium: Stadion Villach-Lind; Referee: Harald Lechner (Austria) |

| 10 October 2014 Friendly | United Arab Emirates | 0–0 | Australia | Abu Dhabi, United Arab Emirates |
| 18:30 UTC+4 | | Report | | Stadium: Mohammed bin Zayed Stadium; Referee: Vladislav Tseytlin (Uzbekistan) |

| 14 October 2014 Friendly | United Arab Emirates | 0–4 | Uzbekistan | Al Awir, United Arab Emirates |
| 18:30 UTC+4 | | Report | Kapadze 30'; Salem 45+1' (o.g.); Djeparov 68'; Olimov 90+5' | Stadium: Al Awir Stadium |

| 6 November 2014 Friendly | United Arab Emirates | 3–2 | Lebanon | Al-Ahsa, Saudi Arabia |
| 18:45 UTC+3 | Khalil 42' (pen.), 56' (pen.), 66' | Report | Mansour 58'; Siblini 62' | Stadium: Prince Abdullah bin Jalawi Stadium |

| 14 November 2014 2014 Gulf Cup | United Arab Emirates | 0–0 | Oman | Riyadh, Saudi Arabia |
| 17:45 UTC+3 | | Report | | Stadium: Prince Faisal bin Fahd Stadium; Referee: Marai Al-Awaji (Saudi Arabia) |

| 17 November 2014 2014 Gulf Cup | United Arab Emirates | 2–2 | Kuwait | Riyadh, Saudi Arabia |
| 17:45 UTC+3 | Mabkhout 18', 35' | Report | Nasser 37'; Al-Mutawa 39' | Stadium: Prince Faisal bin Fahd Stadium; Referee: Jameel Abdulhusin (Bahrain) |

| 20 November 2014 2014 Gulf Cup | United Arab Emirates | 2–0 | Iraq | Riyadh, Saudi Arabia |
| 21:00 UTC+3 | Mabkhout 18', 35' | Report | | Stadium: King Fahd International Stadium; Referee: Fahad Al-Mirdasi (Saudi Arabia) |

| 23 November 2014 2014 Gulf Cup | Saudi Arabia | 3–2 | United Arab Emirates | Riyadh, Saudi Arabia |
| 21:00 UTC+3 | Al-Shamrani 19'; Al-Abed 22'; Al-Dawsari 86' | Report | Khalil 53', 79' | Stadium: King Fahd International Stadium; Referee: Valentin Kovalenko (Uzbekistan) |

| 25 November 2014 2014 Gulf Cup | United Arab Emirates | 1–0 | Oman | Riyadh, Saudi Arabia |
| 17:45 UTC+3 | Mabkhout 59' | Report | | Stadium: Prince Faisal bin Fahd Stadium; Referee: Abdullah Balideh (Qatar) |

| 30 December 2014 Friendly | United Arab Emirates | 1–0 | Jordan | Gold Coast, Australia |
| 12:00 UTC+10 | Saleh 90+1' | Report | | Stadium: Robina Stadium |

=== 2015 ===
| 11 January 2015 2015 Asian Cup | United Arab Emirates | 4–1 | Qatar | Canberra, Australia |
| 18:00 UTC+11 | Khalil 37', 52'; Mabkhout 56', 89' | Report | Ibrahim 23' | Stadium: Canberra Stadium; Attendance: 7,925; Referee: Chris Beath (Australia) |

| 15 January 2015 2015 Asian Cup | Bahrain | 1–2 | United Arab Emirates | Canberra, Australia |
| 18:00 UTC+11 | Okwunwanne 26' | Report | Mabkhout 1'; Husain 74' (o.g.) | Stadium: Canberra Stadium; Attendance: 7,925; Referee: Chris Beath (Australia) |

| 19 January 2015 2015 Asian Cup | Iran | 1–0 | United Arab Emirates | Brisbane, Australia |
| 19:00 UTC+10 | Ghoochannejhad 90+1' | Report | | Stadium: Lang Park; Attendance: 11,394; Referee: Ryuji Sato (Japan) |

| 27 January 2015 2015 Asian Cup | Japan | 1–1 (4–5 p) | United Arab Emirates | Sydney, Australia |
| 20:30 UTC+11 | Shibasaki 81' | Report | Mabkhout 7' | Stadium: Stadium Australia; Attendance: 19,094; Referee: Alireza Faghani (Iran) |
| | Penalties |
| | Honda (penalty missed); Hasebe (penalty scored); Shibasaki (penalty scored); Toyoda (penalty scored); Morishige (penalty scored); Kagawa (penalty missed) | | (penalty scored) Abdulrahman; (penalty scored) Mabkhout; (penalty missed) Esmaeel; (penalty scored) Hassan; (penalty scored) Al Fardan; (penalty scored) Ahmed |

| 27 January 2015 2015 Asian Cup | Australia | 2–0 | United Arab Emirates | Newcastle, Australia |
| 20:00 UTC+11 | Sainsbury 3'; Davidson 14' | Report | | Stadium: Newcastle Stadium; Attendance: 21,079; Referee: Ravshan Irmatov (Uzbekistan) |

| 30 January 2015 2015 Asian Cup | Iraq | 2–3 | United Arab Emirates | Newcastle, Australia |
| 20:00 UTC+11 | Salim 28'; Kalaf 42' | Report | Khalil 16', 51'; Mabkhout 57' (pen.) | Stadium: Newcastle Stadium; Attendance: 12,829; Referee: Nawaf Shukralla (Bahrain) |

| 11 June 2015 Friendly | South Korea | 3–0 | United Arab Emirates | Shah Alam, Malaysia |
| 13:20 UTC+8 | Ki-hun 45'; Yong-jae 60'; Jeong-hyeop 90' | Report | | Stadium: Shah Alam Stadium; Attendance: 1,080; Referee: Võ Minh Trí (Vietnam) |

| 16 June 2015 2018 FIFA World Cup Qualification | Timor-Leste | 0–3 (Awarded) | United Arab Emirates | Shah Alam, Malaysia |
| 16:00 UTC+8 | | Report | Abdulrahman 80' | Stadium: Shah Alam Stadium; Attendance: 200; Referee: Ma Ning (China) |

| 3 September 2015 2018 FIFA World Cup Qualification | United Arab Emirates | 10–0 | Malaysia | Abu Dhabi, United Arab Emirates |
| 19:15 UTC+4 | Salem 16'; Mabkhout 22', 33', 76'; Khalil 24', 29', 70', 78'; Al Fardan 25'; Ahmed 37' | Report | | Stadium: Mohammed bin Zayed Stadium; Attendance: 7,822; Referee: Abdulrahman Al-Jassim (Qatar) |

| 8 September 2015 2018 FIFA World Cup Qualification | Palestine | 0–0 | United Arab Emirates | Al-Ram, Palestine |
| 17:00 UTC+3 | | Report | | Stadium: Faisal Al-Husseini International Stadium; Attendance: 15,000; Referee: Ali Sabah (Iraq) |

| 8 October 2015 2018 FIFA World Cup Qualification | Saudi Arabia | 2–1 | United Arab Emirates | Jeddah, Saudi Arabia |
| 20:00 UTC+3 | Al-Sahlawi 45', 90' | Report | Khalil 18' | Stadium: King Abdullah Sports City; Attendance: 32,482; Referee: Muhammed Taqi (Singapore) |

| 5 November 2015 Friendly | United Arab Emirates | 5–1 | Turkmenistan | Abu Dhabi, United Arab Emirates |
| 20:15 UTC+4 | Abdulrahman 32'; Omar 38'; Mabkhout 64', 76', 81' | Report | Muhadow 58' | Stadium: Mohammed bin Zayed Stadium |

| 12 November 2015 2018 FIFA World Cup Qualification | United Arab Emirates | 8–0 | Timor-Leste | Abu Dhabi, United Arab Emirates |
| 20:15 UTC+4 | Mabkhout 15', 19'; Khalil 43', 53' (pen.), 56', 57'; Ali 54'; Al Attas 87' | Report | | Stadium: Mohammed bin Zayed Stadium; Attendance: 7,870; Referee: Mohsen Torky (Iran) |

| 17 November 2015 2018 FIFA World Cup Qualification | Malaysia | 1–2 | United Arab Emirates | Shah Alam, Malaysia |
| 20:45 UTC+8 | Bakhtiar 59' | Report | Abdulrahman 22'; Khalil 52' | Stadium: Shah Alam Stadium; Attendance: 100; Referee: Masaaki Toma (Japan) |

=== 2016 ===
| 16 January 2016 Friendly | United Arab Emirates | 2–1 | Iceland | Abu Dhabi, United Arab Emirates |
| 18:15 UTC+4 | Al Hammadi 25'; Mabkhout 48' | Report | Kjartansson 14' | Stadium: Mohammed bin Zayed Stadium; Referee: Jovanović (Serbia) |

| 18 March 2016 Friendly | United Arab Emirates | 6–1 | Bangladesh | Abu Dhabi, United Arab Emirates |
| 19:00 UTC+4 | Al Hammadi 2', 69'; Khalil 49'; Saleh 82', 87'; Al Abri 90' (pen.) | Report | Jibon 5' | Stadium: Zayed Sports City Stadium; Referee: Al Majarafi Said (Oman) |

| 24 March 2016 2018 FIFA World Cup Qualification | United Arab Emirates | 2–0 | Palestine | Abu Dhabi, United Arab Emirates |
| 19:00 UTC+4 | Al Hammadi 33'; Khalil 60' (pen.) | Report | | Stadium: Mohammed bin Zayed Stadium; Attendance: 15,822; Referee: Ben Williams (Australia) |

| 29 March 2016 2018 FIFA World Cup Qualification | United Arab Emirates | 1–1 | Saudi Arabia | Abu Dhabi, United Arab Emirates |
| 19:00 UTC+4 | Abdulrahman 52' | Report | Al-Jassim | Stadium: Mohammed bin Zayed Stadium; Attendance: 32,325; Referee: Nawaf Shukralla (Bahrain) |

| 3 June 2016 King's Cup | United Arab Emirates | 1–3 | Jordan | Bangkok, Thailand |
| 17:00 UTC+7 | Al-Shamsi 45+2' | Report | Abdelrahman; Al-Dardour; Khairullah | Stadium: Rajamangala Stadium; Referee: Aziz Asimov (Uzbekistan) |

| 5 June 2016 King's Cup | United Arab Emirates | 0–1 | Syria | Bangkok, Thailand |
| 17:00 UTC+7 | Al-Shamsi 45+2' | Report | Al-Mawas | Stadium: Rajamangala Stadium; Referee: Khamis Al-Marri (Qatar) |

| 24 August 2016 Friendly | North Korea | 2–0 | United Arab Emirates | Shanghai, China |
| 14:30 UTC+8 | Il-gwan 25' (pen.); Myong 45' | Report | | Stadium: Shanghai Stadium |

| 1 September 2016 2018 FIFA World Cup Qualification | Japan | 1–2 | United Arab Emirates | Saitama, Japan |
| 19:35 UTC+9 | Honda 11' | Report | Khalil 20', 54' (pen.) | Stadium: Saitama Stadium 2002; Attendance: 58,895; Referee: Abdulrahman Al-Jassim (Qatar) |

| 6 September 2016 2018 FIFA World Cup Qualification | United Arab Emirates | 0–1 | Australia | Abu Dhabi, United Arab Emirates |
| 19:30 UTC+4 | | Report | Cahill 75' | Stadium: Mohammed bin Zayed Stadium; Attendance: 40,893; Referee: Amirul Izwan (Malaysia) |

| 6 October 2016 2018 FIFA World Cup Qualification | United Arab Emirates | 3–1 | Thailand | Abu Dhabi, United Arab Emirates |
| 20:00 UTC+4 | Mabkhout 14', 47'; Khalil 90+3' | Report | | Stadium: Mohammed bin Zayed Stadium; Attendance: 18,242; Referee: Liu Kwok Man (Hong Kong) |

| 11 October 2016 2018 FIFA World Cup Qualification | Saudi Arabia | 3–0 | United Arab Emirates | Jeddah, Saudi Arabia |
| 20:45 UTC+4 | Al-Muwallad 73'; Al-Abed 79'; Al-Shehri 90+2' | Report | | Stadium: King Abdullah Sports City; Attendance: 60,102; Referee: Kim Jong-hyeok (South Korea) |

| 9 November 2016 Friendly | United Arab Emirates | 2–0 | Bahrain | Al Ain, United Arab Emirates |
| 23:20 UTC+4 | Matar 31'; Abbas 59' | Report | | Stadium: Hazza bin Zayed Stadium |

| 15 November 2016 2018 FIFA World Cup Qualification | United Arab Emirates | 2–0 | Iraq | Abu Dhabi, United Arab Emirates |
| 19:20 UTC+4 | Khalil 26'; Matar 90+3' | Report | | Stadium: Mohammed bin Zayed Stadium; Attendance: 14,583; Referee: Ilgiz Tantashev (Uzbekistan) |

=== 2017 ===
| 23 March 2017 2018 FIFA World Cup Qualification | United Arab Emirates | 0–2 | Japan | Al Ain, United Arab Emirates |
| 19:30 UTC+4 | | Report | Kubo 14'; Konno 52' | Stadium: Hazza bin Zayed Stadium; Attendance: 23,725; Referee: Ravshan Irmatov (Oman) |

| 28 March 2017 2018 FIFA World Cup Qualification | Australia | 2–0 | United Arab Emirates | Sydney, Australia |
| 20:00 UTC+11 | Irvine 7'; Leckie 78' | Report | | Stadium: Sydney Football Stadium; Attendance: 27,328; Referee: Ahmed Al-Kaf (Oman) |

| 7 June 2017 Friendly | United Arab Emirates | 4–0 | Laos | Shah Alam, Malaysia |
| 17:00 UTC+8 | Mabkhout 13', 47'; Khalil 38'; Ahmed 71' | Report | | Stadium: Shah Alam Stadium; Referee: Suhaizi Shukri (Malaysia) |

| 13 June 2017 2018 FIFA World Cup Qualification | Thailand | 1–1 | United Arab Emirates | Bangkok, Thailand |
| 19:00 UTC+7 | Mongkol 69' | Report | Mabkhout 90+3' | Stadium: Rajamangala Stadium; Attendance: 24,417; Referee: Muhammed Taqi (Singapore) |

| 29 August 2017 2018 FIFA World Cup Qualification | United Arab Emirates | 2–1 | Saudi Arabia | Al Ain, United Arab Emirates |
| 20:30 UTC+4 | Mabkhout 21'; Khalil 60' | Report | Al-Abed 20' (pen.) | Stadium: Hazza bin Zayed Stadium; Attendance: 10,221; Referee: Kim Jong-hyeok (South Korea) |

| 5 September 2017 2018 FIFA World Cup Qualification | Iraq | 1–0 | United Arab Emirates | Amman, Jordan |
| 18:00 UTC+3 | Hussein 29' | Report | | Stadium: Amman International Stadium; Attendance: 2,185; Referee: Adham Makhadmeh (Jordan) |

| 10 November 2017 Friendly | United Arab Emirates | 0–1 | Haiti | Al Ain, United Arab Emirates |
| 17:00 UTC+4 | | Report | Khamees 25' (o.g.) | Stadium: Khalifa bin Zayed Stadium |

| 14 November 2017 Friendly | United Arab Emirates | 1–0 | Uzbekistan | Al Ain, United Arab Emirates |
| 16:55 UTC+4 | Mabkhout 16' | Report | | Stadium: Khalifa bin Zayed Stadium; Referee: Turki Al Khudair (Saudi Arabia) |

| 22 December 2017 2017 Gulf Cup | Oman | 0–1 | United Arab Emirates | Kuwait City, Kuwait |
| 21:00 UTC+3 | | Report | Mabkhout 28' (pen.) | Stadium: Jaber International Stadium; Referee: Ali Sabah (Iraq) |

| 25 December 2017 2017 Gulf Cup | United Arab Emirates | 0–0 | Saudi Arabia | Kuwait City, Kuwait |
| 17:30 UTC+3 | | Report | | Stadium: Jaber International Stadium; Attendance: 47,556; Referee: Aziz Asimov (Uzbekistan) |

| 28 December 2017 2017 Gulf Cup | Kuwait | 0–0 | United Arab Emirates | Kuwait City, Kuwait |
| 18:30 UTC+3 | | Report | | Stadium: Jaber International Stadium; Referee: Ali Sabah (Iraq) |

=== 2018 ===
| 2 January 2018 2017 Gulf Cup | Iraq | 0–0 (a.e.t.) (2–4 p) | United Arab Emirates | Kuwait City, Kuwait |
| 20:30 UTC+3 | | Report | | Stadium: Jaber International Stadium; Referee: Aziz Asimov (Uzbekistan) |
| | Penalties |
| | Abdul-Zahra (penalty missed); Abdul-Amir (penalty scored); Tariq (penalty missed); Attwan (penalty scored) | | (penalty scored) Mabkhout; (penalty scored) Abdulrahman; (penalty scored) Esmaeel; (penalty scored) Barqesh |

| 5 January 2018 2017 Gulf Cup | Oman | 0–0 (a.e.t.) (5–4 p) | United Arab Emirates | Kuwait City, Kuwait |
| 17:30 UTC+3 | | Report | | Stadium: Jaber International Stadium; Referee: Ali Shaban (Kuwait) |
| | Penalties |
| | Al-Muqbali (penalty scored); Al-Mukhaini (penalty scored); Al-Mahaijri (penalty scored); Al-Ruzaiqi (penalty scored); Al-Khaldi (penalty scored) | | (penalty scored) Mabkhout; (penalty scored) Barman; (penalty scored) Ahmed Ismail; (penalty scored) Barqesh; (penalty missed) Abdulrahman |

| 22 March 2018 King's Cup | Slovakia | 2–1 | United Arab Emirates | Bangkok, Thailand |
| 16:30 UTC+7 | Rusnák 42'; Ďuriš 45' | Report | Khalil 73' | Stadium: Rajamangala National Stadium; Attendance: 8,360; Referee: Gopalakrishnan Letchman (Singapore) |

| 25 March 2018 King's Cup | United Arab Emirates | 0–1 | Gabon | Bangkok, Thailand |
| 16:30 UTC+7 | | Report | Madinda 14' | Stadium: Rajamangala National Stadium; Referee: Gopalakrishnan Letchman (Singapore) |

| 18 August 2018 Friendly | Andorra | 0–0 | United Arab Emirates | Grödig, Austria |
| 18:00 UTC+2 | | Report | | Stadium: Untersberg-Arena; Referee: Christopher Jäger (Austria) |

| 6 September 2018 Friendly | Trinidad and Tobago | 2–0 | United Arab Emirates | Girona, Spain |
| 18:00 UTC+2 | Guerra 37'; Lewis 58' | Report | | Stadium: Estadi Montilivi; Referee: Hugo Miguel (Portugal) |

| 11 September 2018 Friendly | United Arab Emirates | 3–0 | Laos | Palamós, Spain |
| 20:00 UTC+2 | Mabkhout 24', 26'; Abdulrahman 68' | Report | | Stadium: Estadi Palamós Costa Brava; Referee: Fabio Verissimo (Portugal) |

| 11 October 2018 Friendly | United Arab Emirates | 1–1 | Honduras | Barcelona, Spain |
| 18:00 UTC+2 | Abdulrahman 32' | Report | Quioto 18' | Stadium: Estadi Olímpic Lluís Companys; Referee: João Capela (Portugal) |

| 16 October 2018 Friendly | United Arab Emirates | 0–2 | Venezuela | Barcelona, Spain |
| 17:00 UTC+2 | | Report | Mago 1'; Ponce 47' | Stadium: Estadi Olímpic Lluís Companys; Attendance: 300; Referee: Carlos Taborda Xistra (Portugal) |

| 16 November 2018 Friendly | United Arab Emirates | 0–0 | Bolivia | Dubai, United Arab Emirates |
| 18:25 UTC+4 | | Report | | Stadium: Maktoum bin Rashid Al Maktoum Stadium; Referee: Ammar Ashkanani (Kuwait) |

| 20 November 2018 Friendly | United Arab Emirates | 2–0 | Yemen | Dubai, United Arab Emirates |
| 18:25 UTC+4 | Rashid 20'; Salmeen 66' | Report | | Stadium: Zabeel Stadium; Referee: Shukri Al Hanfosh (Saudi Arabia) |

=== 2019 ===
| 5 January 2019 2019 Asian Cup | United Arab Emirates | 1–1 | Bahrain | Abu Dhabi, United Arab Emirates |
| 20:00 UTC+4 | Khalil 88' (pen.) | Report | Al Romaihi 78' | Stadium: Zayed Sports City Stadium; Attendance: 33,878; Referee: Adham Makhadmeh (Jordan) |

| 10 January 2019 2019 Asian Cup | India | 0–2 | United Arab Emirates | Abu Dhabi, United Arab Emirates |
| 20:00 UTC+4 | | Report | Khalf. Mubarak 41'; Mabkhout 88' | Stadium: Zayed Sports City Stadium; Attendance: 43,206; Referee: César Arturo Ramos (Mexico) |

| 14 January 2019 2019 Asian Cup | United Arab Emirates | 1–1 | Thailand | Al Ain, United Arab Emirates |
| 20:00 UTC+4 | Mabkhout 7' | Report | Thitipan 41' | Stadium: Hazza Bin Zayed Stadium; Attendance: 17,809; Referee: Ryuji Sato (Japan) |

| 21 January 2019 2019 Asian Cup | United Arab Emirates | 3–2 (a.e.t.) | Kyrgyzstan | Abu Dhabi, United Arab Emirates |
| 21:00 UTC+4 | Esmaeel 14'; Mabkhout 64'; Khalil 103' (pen.) | Report | Murzaev 26'; Rustamov 90+1' | Stadium: Zayed Sports City Stadium; Attendance: 17,784; Referee: Fu Ming (China PR) |

| 25 January 2019 2019 Asian Cup | United Arab Emirates | 1–0 | Australia | Al Ain, United Arab Emirates |
| 20:00 UTC+4 | Mabkhout 68' | Report | | Stadium: Hazza bin Zayed Stadium; Attendance: 25,023; Referee: Ryuji Sato (Japan) |

| 29 January 2019 2019 Asian Cup | Qatar | 4–0 | United Arab Emirates | Abu Dhabi, United Arab Emirates |
| 18:00 UTC+4 | Khoukhi 22'; Ali 37'; Al-Haydos 80'; Ismail 90+4' | Report | | Stadium: Mohammed bin Zayed Stadium; Attendance: 38,646; Referee: César Arturo Ramos (Mexico) |

| 21 March 2019 Friendly | United Arab Emirates | 2–1 | Saudi Arabia | Abu Dhabi, United Arab Emirates |
| 17:45 UTC+4 | Al-Ahbabi 54'; Mabkhout 63' | Report | Adam 18' | Stadium: Al Nahyan Stadium; Attendance: 101; Referee: Mohammed Arafah (Jordan) |

| 26 March 2019 Friendly | United Arab Emirates | 0–0 | Syria | Abu Dhabi, United Arab Emirates |
| 17:45 UTC+4 | | Report | | Stadium: Mohammed bin Zayed Stadium; Attendance: 76; Referee: Hamad Ali (Bahrain) |

| 30 August 2019 Friendly | United Arab Emirates | 4–0 | Dominican Republic | Riffa, Bahrain |
| 21:30 UTC+3 | Ibrahim 18', 30'; Al Attas 30'; Al-Ahbabi 85' | Report | | Stadium: Bahrain National Stadium; Referee: Mohammed Al-Hoish (Saudi Arabia) |

| 31 August 2019 Friendly | United Arab Emirates | 5–1 | Sri Lanka | Riffa, Bahrain |
| 20:00 UTC+3 | Mabkhout 18' (pen.), 42', 52'; Barman 66'; Saleh 85' | Report | Musthaq 63' | Stadium: Bahrain National Stadium; Referee: Shukri Hussain Al-Hunfush (Saudi Arabia) |

| 10 September 2019 2022 FIFA World Cup Qualification | Malaysia | 1–2 | United Arab Emirates | Kuala Lumpur, Malaysia |
| 20:45 UTC+8 | Syafiq 1' | Report (FIFA); Report (AFC) | Mabkhout 43', 75' | Stadium: Bukit Jalil National Stadium; Attendance: 43,200; Referee: Hiroyuki Kimura (Japan) |

| 10 October 2019 2022 FIFA World Cup Qualification | United Arab Emirates | 5–0 | Indonesia | Dubai, United Arab Emirates |
| 20:00 UTC+4 | Ibrahim 40'; Mabkhout 51', 63' (pen.), 72'; Hassan 90+3' | Report (FIFA); Report (AFC) | | Stadium: Al Maktoum Stadium; Attendance: 6,768; Referee: Adham Makhadmeh (Jordan) |

| 15 October 2019 2022 FIFA World Cup Qualification | Thailand | 2–1 | United Arab Emirates | Pathum Thani, Thailand |
| 19:00 UTC+7 | Teerasil 26'; Ekanit 51' | Report (FIFA); Report (AFC) | Mabkhout 45+2' | Stadium: Thammasat Stadium; Attendance: 16,057; Referee: Hettikamkanamge Perera (Sri Lanka) |

| 14 November 2019 2022 FIFA World Cup Qualification | Vietnam | 1–0 | United Arab Emirates | Hanoi, Vietnam |
| 20:00 UTC+7 | Nguyễn Tiến Linh 44' | Report (FIFA); Report (AFC) | | Stadium: Mỹ Đình National Stadium; Attendance: 37,989; Referee: Jumpei Iida (Japan) |

| 26 November 2019 2019 Gulf Cup | United Arab Emirates | 3–0 | Yemen | Doha, Qatar |
| 22:30 UTC+3 | Mabkhout 21', 38', 54' | Report | | Stadium: Abdullah bin Khalifa Stadium; Attendance: 1,437; Referee: Ahmed Al-Kaf (Oman) |

| 29 November 2019 2019 Gulf Cup | United Arab Emirates | 0–2 | Iraq | Doha, Qatar |
| 18:30 UTC+3 | | Report | Abbas 6'; Abdul-Zahra 37' | Stadium: Khalifa International Stadium; Attendance: 17,437; Referee: Alexandre Boucaut (Belgium) |

| 2 December 2019 2019 Gulf Cup | Qatar | 4–2 | United Arab Emirates | Doha, Qatar |
| 17:30 UTC+3 | Afif 20', 28' (pen.); Al-Haydos 53'; Khoukhi 90+5' | Report | Mabkhout 33' (pen.), 77' | Stadium: Khalifa International Stadium; Referee: Ryuji Sato (Japan) |

== Statistics ==
=== Venues ===
| | Venue | City | Matches |
|---|---|---|---|
| 1 | Mohammed bin Zayed Stadium | (Emirate of Abu Dhabi) Abu Dhabi | 16 |
| 2 | Khalifa bin Zayed Stadium | (Emirate of Abu Dhabi) Al Ain | 6 |
| 2 | Zayed Sports City Stadium | (Emirate of Abu Dhabi) Abu Dhabi | 6 |
| 4 | Al Nahyan Stadium | (Emirate of Abu Dhabi) Abu Dhabi | 5 |
| 4 | Hazza Bin Zayed Stadium | (Emirate of Abu Dhabi) Al Ain | 5 |
| 5 | Maktoum bin Rashid Al Maktoum Stadium | (Emirate of Dubai) Dubai | 4 |
| 6 | Zabeel Stadium | (Emirate of Dubai) Dubai | 3 |
| 8 | Rashid Stadium | (Emirate of Dubai) Dubai | 2 |
| 8 | Tahnoun bin Mohammed Stadium | (Emirate of Abu Dhabi) Al Ain | 2 |
| 10 | Al Maktoum Stadium | (Emirate of Dubai) Dubai | 1 |
| 10 | Al Awir Stadium | (Emirate of Dubai) Al Awir | 1 |

=== Managers ===
| Name | First match | Last match | Pld | W | D | L | GF | GA | GD |
|---|---|---|---|---|---|---|---|---|---|
| (Slovenia) Srečko Katanec | 6 January 2010 | 6 September 2011 | 23 | 9 | 5 | 8 | 35 | 24 | +11 |
| (United Arab Emirates) Abdullah Mesfer | 6 October 2011 | 29 February 2012 | 7 | 3 | 0 | 4 | 11 | 10 | +1 |
| (United Arab Emirates) Mahdi Ali | 6 September 2012 | 28 March 2017 | 62 | 35 | 12 | 15 | 126 | 63 | +63 |
| (Argentina) Edgardo Bauza | 7 June 2017 | 5 September 2017 | 4 | 2 | 1 | 1 | 7 | 3 | +4 |
| (Italy) Alberto Zaccheroni | 10 November 2017 | 25 January 2019 | 22 | 7 | 9 | 6 | 18 | 17 | +1 |
| (United Arab Emirates) Saleem Abdelrahman | 21 March 2019 | 27 March 2019 | 2 | 1 | 1 | 0 | 2 | 1 | +1 |
| (Netherlands) Bert van Marwijk | 30 August 2019 | 2 December 2019 | 9 | 5 | 0 | 4 | 22 | 11 | +11 |
| Total | | | 129 | 62 | 29 | 38 | 221 | 129 | +92 |

=== Head-to-head records ===
United Arab Emirates national football team head-to-head records (2010–2019)
| Opponent | Pld | W | D | L | GF | GA | GD | Pts | Confederation |
|---|---|---|---|---|---|---|---|---|---|
| Algeria | 1 | 0 | 0 | 1 | 0 | 1 | –1 | 0 | CAF |
| Andorra | 1 | 0 | 1 | 0 | 0 | 0 | 0 | 1 | UEFA |
| Angola | 1 | 0 | 0 | 1 | 0 | 2 | –2 | 0 | CAF |
| Armenia | 1 | 0 | 0 | 1 | 3 | 4 | –1 | 0 | UEFA |
| Australia | 6 | 1 | 2 | 3 | 1 | 5 | –4 | 5 | AFC |
| Bahrain | 6 | 5 | 1 | 0 | 16 | 6 | +10 | 16 | AFC |
| Bangladesh | 1 | 1 | 0 | 0 | 6 | 1 | +5 | 3 | AFC |
| Bolivia | 1 | 0 | 1 | 0 | 0 | 0 | 0 | 1 | CONMEBOL |
| Chile | 1 | 0 | 0 | 1 | 0 | 2 | –2 | 0 | CONMEBOL |
| China | 1 | 0 | 0 | 1 | 1 | 2 | –1 | 0 | AFC |
| Dominican Republic | 1 | 1 | 0 | 0 | 4 | 0 | +4 | 3 | CONCACAF |
| Estonia | 1 | 1 | 0 | 0 | 2 | 1 | +1 | 3 | UEFA |
| Gabon | 1 | 0 | 0 | 1 | 0 | 1 | –1 | 0 | CAF |
| Georgia | 1 | 1 | 0 | 0 | 1 | 0 | +1 | 3 | UEFA |
| Haiti | 1 | 0 | 0 | 1 | 0 | 1 | –1 | 0 | CONCACAF |
| Honduras | 1 | 0 | 1 | 0 | 1 | 1 | 0 | 1 | CONCACAF |
| Hong Kong | 2 | 2 | 0 | 0 | 8 | 0 | +8 | 6 | AFC |
| Iceland | 1 | 1 | 0 | 0 | 2 | 1 | +1 | 3 | UEFA |
| India | 4 | 3 | 1 | 0 | 12 | 2 | +10 | 10 | AFC |
| Indonesia | 1 | 1 | 0 | 0 | 5 | 0 | +5 | 3 | AFC |
| Iran | 2 | 0 | 0 | 2 | 0 | 4 | –4 | 0 | AFC |
| Iraq | 9 | 4 | 2 | 3 | 9 | 7 | +2 | 14 | AFC |
| Japan | 4 | 1 | 1 | 2 | 3 | 5 | –2 | 4 | AFC |
| Jordan | 2 | 1 | 0 | 1 | 2 | 3 | –1 | 3 | AFC |
| Kuwait | 7 | 3 | 2 | 2 | 12 | 7 | +5 | 11 | AFC |
| Kyrgyzstan | 1 | 1 | 0 | 0 | 3 | 2 | +1 | 3 | AFC |
| Laos | 2 | 2 | 0 | 0 | 7 | 0 | +7 | 6 | AFC |
| Lebanon | 4 | 3 | 0 | 1 | 14 | 9 | +5 | 9 | AFC |
| Lithuania | 1 | 0 | 1 | 0 | 1 | 1 | 0 | 1 | UEFA |
| Malaysia | 4 | 4 | 0 | 0 | 15 | 2 | +13 | 12 | AFC |
| Moldova | 1 | 1 | 0 | 0 | 3 | 2 | +1 | 3 | UEFA |
| New Zealand | 1 | 1 | 0 | 0 | 2 | 0 | +2 | 3 | OFC |
| North Korea | 2 | 0 | 1 | 1 | 0 | 2 | –2 | 1 | AFC |
| Norway | 1 | 0 | 1 | 0 | 0 | 0 | 0 | 1 | UEFA |
| Oman | 6 | 3 | 3 | 0 | 4 | 0 | +4 | 12 | AFC |
| Palestine | 3 | 2 | 1 | 0 | 5 | 0 | +5 | 7 | AFC |
| Paraguay | 1 | 0 | 1 | 0 | 0 | 0 | 0 | 1 | CONMEBOL |
| Philippines | 1 | 1 | 0 | 0 | 4 | 0 | +4 | 3 | AFC |
| Qatar | 5 | 3 | 0 | 2 | 12 | 11 | +1 | 9 | AFC |
| Saudi Arabia | 8 | 2 | 2 | 4 | 8 | 12 | –4 | 8 | AFC |
| Slovakia | 1 | 0 | 0 | 1 | 1 | 2 | –1 | 0 | UEFA |
| South Korea | 3 | 0 | 0 | 3 | 1 | 7 | –6 | 0 | AFC |
| Sri Lanka | 1 | 1 | 0 | 0 | 5 | 1 | +4 | 3 | AFC |
| Syria | 3 | 1 | 1 | 1 | 2 | 1 | +1 | 4 | AFC |
| Thailand | 4 | 1 | 2 | 1 | 6 | 5 | +1 | 5 | AFC |
| Timor-Leste | 2 | 2 | 0 | 0 | 11 | 0 | +11 | 6 | AFC |
| Trinidad and Tobago | 2 | 0 | 1 | 1 | 3 | 5 | –2 | 1 | CONCACAF |
| Turkmenistan | 1 | 1 | 0 | 0 | 5 | 1 | +4 | 3 | AFC |
| Uzbekistan | 7 | 4 | 2 | 1 | 8 | 8 | 0 | 14 | AFC |
| Venezuela | 1 | 0 | 0 | 1 | 0 | 2 | –2 | 0 | CONMEBOL |
| Vietnam | 3 | 2 | 0 | 1 | 7 | 2 | +5 | 6 | AFC |
| Yemen | 2 | 2 | 0 | 0 | 5 | 0 | +5 | 6 | AFC |
| Total | 129 | 62 | 29 | 38 | 221 | 129 | +92 | 215 | |
