= 23rd Arabian Gulf Cup squads =

Below were the squads for the 23rd Arabian Gulf Cup in Kuwait in 2017.

== Group A ==
=== Kuwait ===
Coach: (Serbia) Boris Bunjak

No.	Pos.	Player	Date of birth (age)	Caps	Goals	Club
1	GK	Khaled Al-Rashidi	20 April 1987 (aged 30)	19	0	(Kuwait Football Association) Al-Salmiya
2	DF	Sami Al-Sanea	9 January 1993 (aged 24)	1	0	(Kuwait Football Association) Al-Kuwait
3	MF	Ahmed Al-Dhefiri	8 February 1992 (aged 25)	15	0	(Kuwait Football Association) Qadsia
4	DF	Khalid El Ebrahim	28 August 1992 (aged 25)	9	0	(Kuwait Football Association) Qadsia
5	DF	Fahad Al Hajeri	10 November 1991 (aged 26)	25	3	(Saudi Arabian Football Federation) Al-Ettifaq
6	MF	Sultan Al Enezi	29 March 1992 (aged 25)	20	0	(Qatar Football Association) Al-Wakrah
7	MF	Fahad Al Enezi	1 September 1988 (aged 29)	43	6	(Kuwait Football Association) Al-Kuwait
8	MF	Mashari Al Azmi	19 November 1987 (aged 30)	0	0	(Kuwait Football Association) Kazma
9	FW	Faisal Al-Azemi	23 January 1993 (aged 24)	1	0	(Kuwait Football Association) Al-Tadamon
10	MF	Abdullah Al Buraiki	12 August 1987 (aged 30)	14	2	(Kuwait Football Association) Al-Kuwait
11	MF	Fahad Al Ansari	25 February 1987 (aged 30)	48	1	(Saudi Arabian Football Federation) Al-Ittihad
12	DF	Fahad Hammoud	3 October 1990 (aged 27)	0	0	(Kuwait Football Association) Al-Kuwait
13	DF	Khaled Al-Qahtani	16 February 1985 (aged 32)	17	0	(Kuwait Football Association) Qadsia
14	DF	Dhari Said	11 January 1987 (aged 30)	6	0	(Kuwait Football Association) Qadsia
15	MF	Faisal Zaid	9 October 1991 (aged 26)	19	2	(Kuwait Football Association) Jahra
16	FW	Saad Al Ajmi	1 January 1986 (aged 31)	1	0	(Kuwait Football Association) Jahra
17	FW	Bader Al-Mutawa (captain)	10 January 1985 (aged 32)	158	51	(Kuwait Football Association) Qadsia
18	MF	Reda Hani	22 April 1996 (aged 21)	0	0	(Kuwait Football Association) Qadsia
19	DF	Hummoud Melfi	1 January 1988 (aged 29)	0	0	(Kuwait Football Association) Jahra
20	DF	Hussain Hakem	26 June 1984 (aged 33)	22	1	(Kuwait Football Association) Al-Kuwait
21	MF	Ali Maqseed	11 December 1986 (aged 31)	64	8	(Kuwait Football Association) Al-Arabi
22	GK	Hameed Al-Qallaf	10 August 1987 (aged 30)	31	0	(Kuwait Football Association) Al-Kuwait
23	GK	Sulaiman Abdulghafour	21 February 1991 (aged 26)	9	0	(Kuwait Football Association) Al-Arabi

=== Saudi Arabia ===
Coach: (Croatia) Krunoslav Jurčić

- Hazaa Al-Hazaa withdrew before the tournament due to injury.

No.	Pos.	Player	Date of birth (age)	Caps	Goals	Club
1	GK	Moslem Al-Freej	8 April 1988 (aged 29)	0	0	(Saudi Arabian Football Federation) Al-Fayha
2	DF	Salem Saeed	1 March 1999 (aged 18)	0	0	Unattached
3	DF	Abdullah Al-Shameri	17 September 1993 (aged 24)	0	0	(Saudi Arabian Football Federation) Al-Taawoun
4	DF	Mohammed Al-Khabrani	14 October 1993 (aged 24)	2	0	(Saudi Arabian Football Federation) Al-Qadsiah
5	DF	Omar Hawsawi (vice-captain)	27 September 1985 (aged 32)	32	2	(Saudi Arabian Football Federation) Al-Nassr
6	MF	Nooh Al-Mousa	23 February 1991 (aged 26)	3	0	(Saudi Arabian Football Federation) Al-Fateh
7	FW	Salman Al-Moasher	5 October 1988 (aged 29)	18	1	(Saudi Arabian Football Federation) Al-Ahli
8	MF	Ali Al-Nemer	25 August 1991 (aged 26)	0	0	Unattached
9	MF	Naif Hazazi	30 September 1992 (aged 25)	0	0	(Saudi Arabian Football Federation) Al-Qadsiah
10	FW	Hattan Bahebri	16 July 1992 (aged 25)	0	0	(Saudi Arabian Football Federation) Al-Shabab
11	MF	Maan Khodari	13 December 1991 (aged 26)	0	0	(Saudi Arabian Football Federation) Al-Batin
12	DF	Abdulrahman Al-Obaid	30 April 1993 (aged 24)	2	0	(Saudi Arabian Football Federation) Al-Qadsiah
13	DF	Sultan Al-Ghannam	6 May 1994 (aged 23)	0	0	(Saudi Arabian Football Federation) Al-Faisaly
14	MF	Mohamed Kanno	22 September 1994 (aged 23)	0	0	(Saudi Arabian Football Federation) Al-Hilal
15	MF	Ahmed Al-Fraidi (captain)	29 January 1988 (aged 29)	34	6	(Saudi Arabian Football Federation) Al-Nassr
16	MF	Ahmed Al-Fiqi	31 December 1992 (aged 24)	0	0	Unattached
17	MF	Jaber Mustafa	7 June 1997 (aged 20)	0	0	Unattached
18	FW	Khalid Kaabi	24 May 1992 (aged 25)	0	0	(Saudi Arabian Football Federation) Al-Shabab
19	FW	Saleh Al-Amri	14 October 1993 (aged 24)	0	0	(Saudi Arabian Football Federation) Al-Ahli
20	FW	Mukhtar Fallatah	15 October 1987 (aged 30)	9	1	(Saudi Arabian Football Federation) Al-Hilal
21	GK	Abdulquddus Atiah	1 March 1997 (aged 20)	0	0	Unattached
22	GK	Assaf Al-Qarni	2 April 1984 (aged 33)	8	0	(Saudi Arabian Football Federation) Al-Ittihad
23	DF	Hammam Ajaj	24 February 1995 (aged 22)	0	0	Unattached
24	DF	Abdullah Al-Ammar	1 March 1994 (aged 23)	0	0	(Saudi Arabian Football Federation) Al-Fateh

=== Oman ===
Coach: (Netherlands) Pim Verbeek

=== United Arab Emirates ===
Coach: (Italy) Alberto Zaccheroni

No.	Pos.	Player	Date of birth (age)	Caps	Goals	Club
1	GK	Sultan Al-Monzeri	5 January 1995 (aged 22)	0	0	(United Arab Emirates Football Association) Al-Wasl
2	DF	Mohammed Barqesh Al-Menhali	27 October 1990 (aged 27)	0	0	(United Arab Emirates Football Association) Al Wahda
3	DF	Mohammed Marzooq	23 January 1989 (aged 28)	1	0	(United Arab Emirates Football Association) Shabab Al-Ahli
4	DF	Khalifa Mubarak	30 October 1993 (aged 24)	2	0	(United Arab Emirates Football Association) Al-Nasr
5	MF	Ali Salmeen	4 February 1995 (aged 22)	32	2	(United Arab Emirates Football Association) Al-Wasl
6	DF	Mohanad Salem	1 March 1985 (aged 32)	57	2	(United Arab Emirates Football Association) Al Ain
7	FW	Ali Mabkhout	5 October 1990 (aged 27)	60	40	(United Arab Emirates Football Association) Al Jazira
8	MF	Ahmed Barman	February 5, 1994 (aged 23)	7	0	(United Arab Emirates Football Association) Al Ain
9	MF	Khaled Jalal	5 April 1991 (aged 26)	2	0	(United Arab Emirates Football Association) Al-Nasr
10	MF	Omar Abdulrahman	20 September 1991 (aged 26)	57	9	(United Arab Emirates Football Association) Al Ain
11	FW	Ahmed Al-Attas (vice-captain)	September 28, 1995 (aged 22)	5	1	(United Arab Emirates Football Association) Al Jazira
12	GK	Khalid Eisa	15 September 1989 (aged 28)	16	0	(United Arab Emirates Football Association) Al Ain
13	MF	Khamis Esmaeel	November 16, 1989 (aged 28)	12	0	(United Arab Emirates Football Association) Shabab Al-Ahli
14	MF	Rayan Yaslam	23 November 1994 (aged 23)	0	0	(United Arab Emirates Football Association) Al Ain
15	MF	Ismail Al Hammadi	1 July 1988 (aged 29)	94	14	(United Arab Emirates Football Association) Shabab Al-Ahli
16	MF	Mohamed Abdulrahman	February 4, 1989 (aged 28)	33	1	(United Arab Emirates Football Association) Al Ain
17	DF	Fares Juma (captain)	December 30, 1988 (aged 28)	32	2	(United Arab Emirates Football Association) Al Jazira
18	DF	Mohamed Fawzi	February 22, 1990 (aged 27)	33	0	(United Arab Emirates Football Association) Al Jazira
19	DF	Ismail Ahmed	July 7, 1983 (aged 34)	26	0	(United Arab Emirates Football Association) Al Ain
20	FW	Ahmed Malallah	9 November 1991 (aged 26)	0	0	(United Arab Emirates Football Association) Emirates
21	DF	Salem Al-Ozaizi	February 25, 1993 (aged 24)	0	0	(United Arab Emirates Football Association) Al-Wasl
22	GK	Mohammed Al-Shamsi	4 January 1997 (aged 20)	0	0	(United Arab Emirates Football Association) Al Wahda
23	DF	Mahmoud Khamees	October 28, 1987 (aged 30)	26	1	(United Arab Emirates Football Association) Al-Nasr

== Group B ==
=== Qatar ===
Coach: (Spain) Félix Sánchez

No.	Pos.	Player	Date of birth (age)	Caps	Goals	Club
1	GK	Saad Al Sheeb	19 February 1990 (aged 27)	32	0	(Qatar Football Association) Al Sadd
2	DF	Bassam Hisham Al Rawi	16 December 1997 (aged 20)	1	0	(Qatar Football Association) Al-Duhail
3	DF	Abdelkarim Hassan	28 August 1993 (aged 24)	58	9	(Royal Belgian Football Association) Eupen
4	DF	Al-Mahdi Ali Mukhtar	2 March 1992 (aged 25)	20	1	(Qatar Football Association) Al-Gharafa
5	MF	Ahmed Fatehi	25 January 1993 (aged 24)	2	0	(Qatar Football Association) Al Arabi
6	DF	Ahmed Yasser	17 May 1994 (aged 23)	27	0	(Royal Spanish Football Federation) Cultural Leonesa
7	DF	Musab Kheder	1 January 1993 (aged 24)	9	0	(Qatar Football Association) Al Sadd
8	MF	Ahmed Moein	20 October 1995 (aged 22)	1	0	(Royal Spanish Football Federation) Cultural Leonesa
9	FW	Ali Ferydoon	9 October 1992 (aged 25)	0	0	(Qatar Football Association) Al Ahli
10	MF	Hassan Al-Haydos (captain)	11 December 1990 (aged 27)	88	18	(Qatar Football Association) Al Sadd
11	MF	Akram Afif	18 November 1996 (aged 21)	20	3	(Royal Belgian Football Association) Eupen
12	MF	Karim Boudiaf	16 September 1990 (aged 27)	40	4	(Qatar Football Association) Al-Duhail
13	FW	Mohammed Muntari	20 December 1993 (aged 24)	5	0	(Qatar Football Association) Al Ahli
14	MF	Othman Al-Yahri	24 June 1993 (aged 24)	1	0	(Qatar Football Association) Al-Rayyan
15	DF	Pedro Miguel	6 August 1990 (aged 27)	21	0	(Qatar Football Association) Al Sadd
16	MF	Assim Madibo	22 October 1996 (aged 21)	1	0	(Royal Belgian Football Association) Eupen
17	FW	Ismaeel Mohammad	5 April 1990 (aged 27)	33	3	(Qatar Football Association) Al-Duhail
18	DF	Abdulkarim Al-Ali	25 March 1991 (aged 26)	10	1	(Qatar Football Association) Al-Sailiya
19	FW	Almoez Ali	19 August 1996 (aged 21)	15	3	(Qatar Football Association) Al-Duhail
20	MF	Abdullah Al-Ahrak	9 May 1997 (aged 20)	0	0	(Qatar Football Association) Al-Duhail
21	GK	Yousef Hassan	24 May 1996 (aged 21)	5	0	(Qatar Football Association) Al-Gharafa
22	GK	Mohammed Al Bakri	28 March 1997 (aged 20)	1	0	(Qatar Football Association) Al-Duhail
23	MF	Hamad Al-Obeidi	21 April 1991 (aged 26)	5	1	(Qatar Football Association) Al-Sailiya

=== Iraq ===
Coach: (Iraq) Basim Qasim

No.	Pos.	Player	Date of birth (age)	Caps	Goals	Club
1	GK	Jalal Hassan	18 May 1991 (aged 26)	32	0	(Iraq Football Association) Al-Zawraa
2	DF	Ahmad Ibrahim	25 February 1992 (aged 25)	71	2	(Saudi Arabian Football Federation) Al-Ettifaq
3	DF	Ali Bahjat	3 March 1992 (aged 25)	30	0	(Iraq Football Association) Al-Quwa Al-Jawiya
4	DF	Mustafa Nadhim	23 September 1993 (aged 24)	20	3	(Iraq Football Association) Al-Najaf
5	DF	Ali Faez	9 September 1994 (aged 23)	11	0	(Iraq Football Association) Al-Shorta
6	MF	Nabeel Sabah	1 July 1990 (aged 27)	11	0	(Iraq Football Association) Al-Shorta
7	MF	Ali Husni	23 May 1994 (aged 23)	17	1	(Iraq Football Association) Al-Minaa
8	FW	Mohannad Abdul-Raheem	22 September 1993 (aged 24)	39	12	(United Arab Emirates Football Association) Al-Dhafra
9	FW	Ayman Hussein	22 March 1996 (aged 21)	12	1	(Iraq Football Association) Al-Shorta
10	FW	Alaa Abdul-Zahra (captain)	22 December 1987 (aged 30)	111	15	(Iraq Football Association) Al-Shorta
11	MF	Humam Tariq	10 February 1996 (aged 21)	38	1	(Iraq Football Association) Al-Quwa Al-Jawiya
12	GK	Mohammed Gassid	10 December 1986 (aged 31)	67	0	(Iraq Football Association) Al-Minaa
13	FW	Mohannad Ali	20 June 2000 (aged 17)	1	0	(Iraq Football Association) Al-Shorta
14	DF	Saad Natiq	19 March 1994 (aged 23)	10	0	(Qatar Football Association) Al-Arabi
15	MF	Ibrahim Bayesh	1 May 2000 (aged 17)	0	0	(Iraq Football Association) Al-Zawraa
16	MF	Hussein Ali	29 November 1996 (aged 21)	5	0	(Iraq Football Association) Al-Zawraa
17	DF	Alaa Mhawi	3 June 1996 (aged 21)	11	0	(Iraq Football Association) Al-Shorta
18	MF	Amjad Attwan	12 March 1997 (aged 20)	18	0	(Iraq Football Association) Al-Najaf
19	MF	Mahdi Kamel	6 January 1995 (aged 22)	34	2	(Iraq Football Association) Al-Shorta
20	DF	Rebin Sulaka	12 April 1992 (aged 25)	10	0	(Qatar Football Association) Al-Markhiya
21	MF	Saad Abdul-Amir (vice-captain)	19 January 1992 (aged 25)	71	4	(Saudi Arabian Football Federation) Al-Shabab
22	GK	Mohammed Hameed	24 January 1993 (aged 24)	20	0	(Iraq Football Association) Al-Shorta
23	FW	Sajad Hussein	9 September 1998 (aged 19)	1	0	(Iraq Football Association) Amanat Baghdad

=== Yemen ===
Coach: (Ethiopia) Abraham Mebratu

=== Bahrain ===
Coach: (Czech Republic) Miroslav Soukup

No.	Pos.	Player	Date of birth (age)	Caps	Goals	Club
1	GK	Sayed Shubbar Alawi	11 August 1985 (aged 32)	3	0	(Bahrain Football Association) Al-Najma
2	DF	Sayed Mahdi Baqer	14 April 1994 (aged 23)	3	0	(Bahrain Football Association) Al-Najma
3	DF	Waleed Al-Hayam	3 February 1991 (aged 26)	12	0	(Bahrain Football Association) Al-Muharraq
4	MF	Sayed Saeed	17 July 1992 (aged 25)	19	5	(Bahrain Football Association) Al-Riffa
5	DF	Adel Hasan	20 September 1996 (aged 21)	3	0	(Bahrain Football Association) Manama
6	MF	Abdulla Yaser	27 March 1988 (aged 29)	6	0	(Bahrain Football Association) Al-Muharraq
7	MF	Abdulwahab Al-Safi (captain)	4 June 1984 (aged 33)	39	1	(Bahrain Football Association) Al-Muharraq
8	MF	Ibrahim Ahmed Habib	5 February 1989 (aged 28)	0	0	(Bahrain Football Association) Al-Najma
9	FW	Mahdi Abduljabbar	25 June 1991 (aged 26)	3	0	(Bahrain Football Association) Al-Ittihad
10	MF	Ali Habib Haji	23 March 1992 (aged 25)	0	0	(Bahrain Football Association) Manama
11	MF	Ali Madan	30 November 1995 (aged 22)	3	1	(Bahrain Football Association) Al-Najma
12	MF	Mohmmed Sahwaan	24 June 1989 (aged 28)	0	0	(Bahrain Football Association) Al-Shabab
13	DF	Abdulla Al-Haza'a	19 July 1990 (aged 27)	28	0	(Bahrain Football Association) Al-Hidd
14	FW	Abdulla Yusuf Helal	12 June 1993 (aged 24)	3	0	(Bahrain Football Association) Al-Muharraq
15	MF	Ali Haram	16 July 1988 (aged 29)	12	1	(Bahrain Football Association) Manama
16	DF	Sayed Reda Issa	7 August 1994 (aged 23)	0	0	(Bahrain Football Association) Malkiya
17	DF	Ahmed Bughammar	30 December 1997 (aged 19)	3	0	(Bahrain Football Association) Al-Hidd
18	DF	Ahmed Abdulla Ali	29 October 1983 (aged 34)	0	0	(Bahrain Football Association) East Riffa Club
19	MF	Kamil Al Aswad	8 April 1994 (aged 23)	12	4	(Bahrain Football Association) Al-Riffa
20	FW	Sami Al-Husaini	29 September 1989 (aged 28)	40	29	(Bahrain Football Association) East Riffa Club
21	GK	Ashraf Waheed Al Sebaie	5 July 1991 (aged 26)	0	0	(Bahrain Football Association) Manama
22	GK	Abdulkarim Fardan	25 April 1992 (aged 25)	0	0	(Bahrain Football Association) Malkiya
23	MF	Jamal Rashid	7 November 1988 (aged 29)	3	2	(Bahrain Football Association) Al-Muharraq
