= Al Hassan Saleh =

Emirati footballer (born 1991)

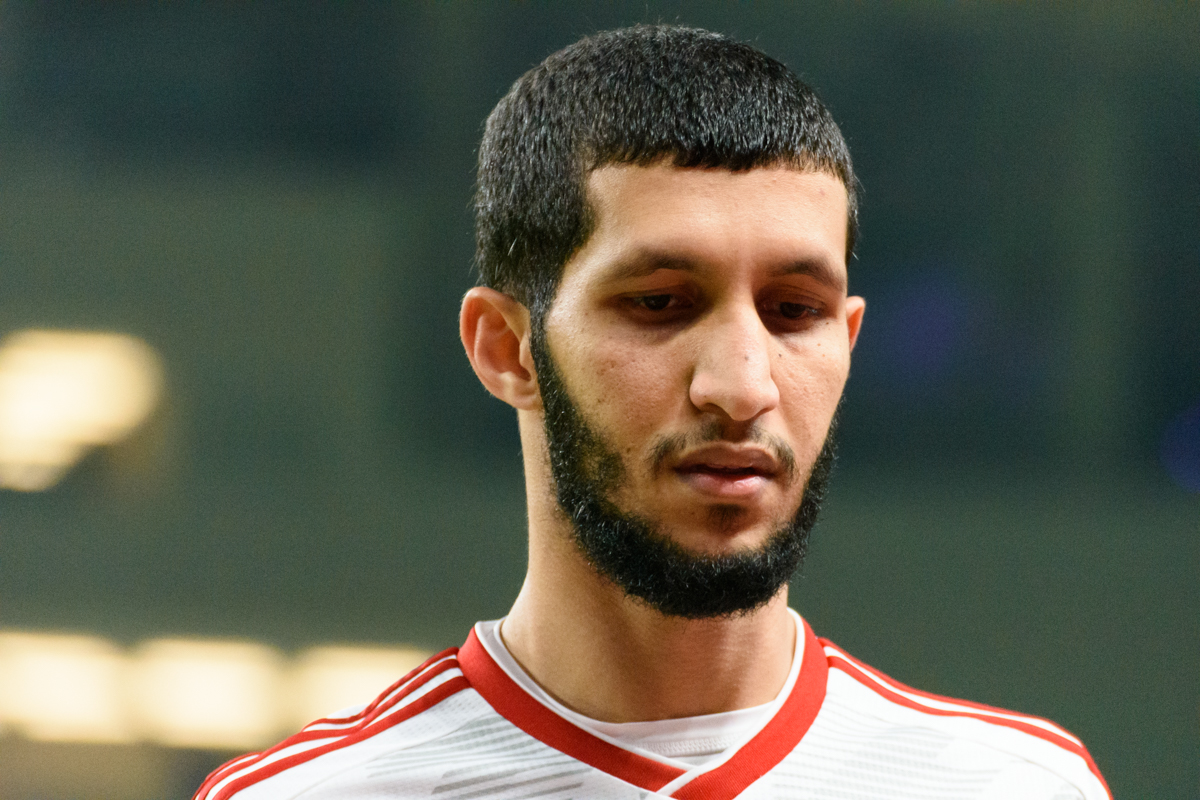

Personal information
- Full name: Al Hassan Saleh Eisa Ali
- Date of birth: 25 June 1991 (age 35)
- Place of birth: Ras Al Khaimah, United Arab Emirates
- Height: 1.70 m (5 ft 7 in)
- Position: Left back

Team information
- Current team: Al Bataeh (on loan from Sharjah)
- Number: 13

Youth career
- 2004–2009: Ras Al Khaima

Senior career*
Years	Team	Apps	(Gls)
2009–2011	Ras Al Khaimah		
2011–2016	Emirates		
2016–	Sharjah	146	(1)
2026–	→ Al Bataeh (loan)	0	(0)

International career^{‡}
2018–2022	United Arab Emirates	11	(0)
- * Club domestic league appearances and goals as of 28 December 2018 ‡ National team caps and goals as of 21 January 2019

Al Hassan Saleh (Arabic: الحسن صالح; born 25 June 1991) is an Emirati footballer. He currently plays as a left back for Al Bataeh, on loan from Sharjah.

== Honours ==
Emirates

- UAE Division One: 2012–13

Sharjah

- UAE Pro League: 2018–19
- UAE President's Cup: 2021–22, 2022–23
- UAE League Cup: 2022–23
- UAE Super Cup: 2019, 2022
- AFC Champions League Two: 2024–25
