= Khalfan Mubarak =

Emirati footballer (born 1995)

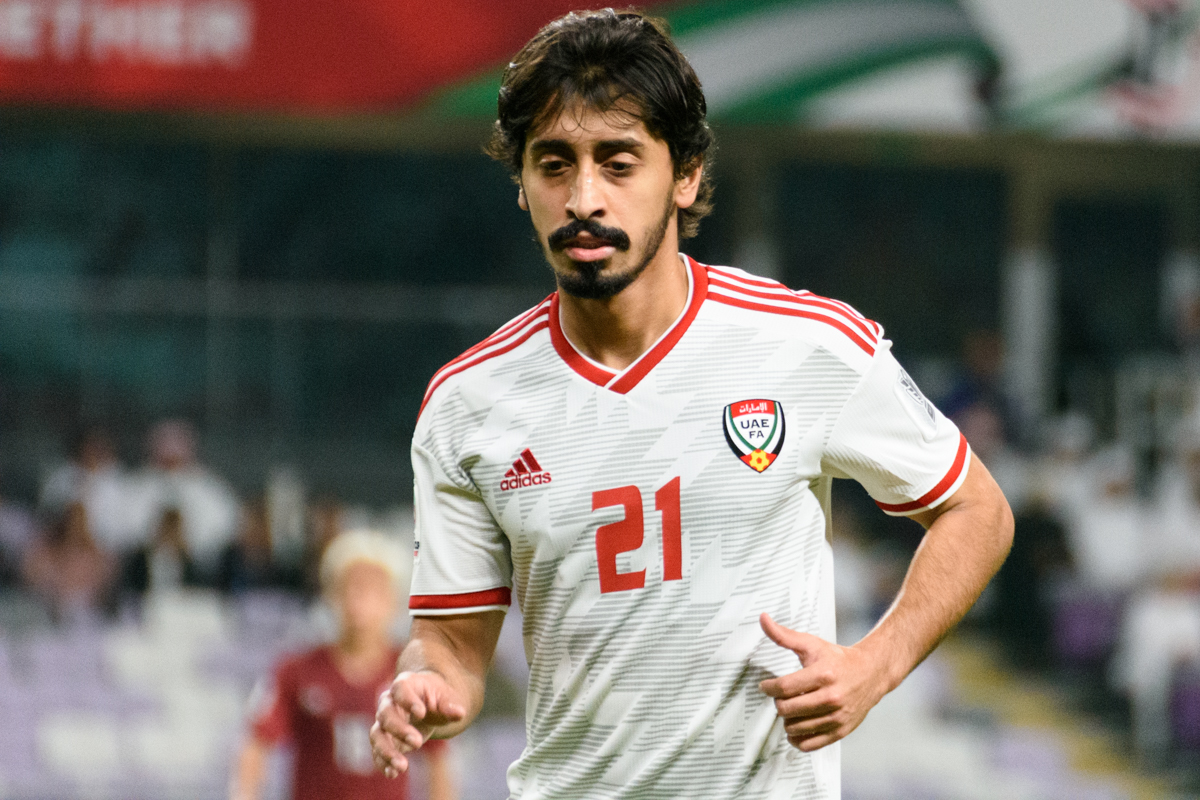
- Khalfan Mubarak at the 2019 AFC Asian Cup

Personal information
- Full name: Khalfan Mubarak Khalfan Obaid Alrizzi Al Shamsi
- Date of birth: 9 May 1995 (age 31)
- Place of birth: Ajman, United Arab Emirates
- Height: 1.65 m (5 ft 5 in)
- Position: Attacking midfielder

Youth career
- 2001–2008: Ajman
- 2008–2011: Al Ahli

Senior career*
Years	Team	Apps	(Gls)
2011–2013	Al Ahli	1	(0)
2013–2025	Al Jazira	170	(35)
2025–2026	Baniyas	8	(0)

International career^{‡}
2011–2013	United Arab Emirates U18	4	(1)
2018–2022	United Arab Emirates	29	(1)
- * Club domestic league appearances and goals as of 18 April 2021 ‡ National team caps and goals as of 24 May 2021

Khalfan Mubarak Al Shamsi (Arabic: خلفان مبارك خلفان عبيد الرزي الشامسي; born 9 May 1995) is an Emirati footballer who plays as an Attacking midfielder.

== Club career ==
Khalfan was born in Ajman to father Mubarak Khalfan, a colonel in Ajman police, former footballer in Ajman club. In 2001, at the age of 6, his father enrolled him in the Ajman youth academy till he reached 12 years. In 2008, he moved to Al Ahli.

=== Al Jazira ===
On 12 July 2013, Khalfan signed a three-year deal with Al Jazira. The agreement also stipulates that Al Jazira will pay €375.000 thousand for Al Ahli for the player care.

== International career ==
Khalfan Mubarak made his international debut for the senior team in 2018.

Khalfan in the 2019 AFC Asian Cup scored his first international goal against India.

=== International goal ===
Scores and results list the United Arab Emirates' goal tally first.

Goal	Date	Venue	Opponent	Score	Result	Competition
1.	10 January 2019	Zayed Sports City Stadium, Abu Dhabi, United Arab Emirates	India	1–0	2–0	2019 AFC Asian Cup
