= Hamad Al-Shamsan =

Bahraini footballer

Personal information
- Full name: Hamad Mahmood Ismaeel Ali Mohamed Al-Shamsan
- Date of birth: 29 September 1997 (age 29)
- Place of birth: Manama, Bahrain
- Height: 1.79 m (5 ft 10 in)
- Position: Defender

Team information
- Current team: Al-Riffa

Senior career*
Years	Team	Apps	(Gls)
2015–2018	Budaiya		
2018–	Al-Riffa		

International career^{‡}
2016	Bahrain U19	3	(0)
2017	Bahrain U20	2	(0)
2017–2020	Bahrain U23	6	(1)
2018–	Bahrain	21	(0)
Medal record
Men's football
Representing Bahrain
Gulf Cup
Winner	2024 Kuwait
- * Club domestic league appearances and goals as of 15:43, 5 January 2019 (UTC) ‡ National team caps and goals as of 15:43, 22 January 2019 (UTC)

Hamad Mahmood Ismaeel Ali Mohamed Al-Shamsan (Arabic: حَمَد مَحمُود إسمَاعِيْل عَلِيّ مُحَمَّد الشَّمْسَان; born 29 September 1997) is a Bahraini footballer who plays as a defender for Al-Riffa and the Bahrain national team.

== Career ==
Al-Shamsan was included in Bahrain's squad for the 2019 AFC Asian Cup in the United Arab Emirates.

== Career statistics ==
=== International ===
As of 19 November 2018

Bahrain
Year	Apps	Goals
2018	3	0
Total	3	0
