= Khalifa Mubarak =

Emirati footballer (born 1993)

Khalifah Mubarak
Personal information
- Full name: Khalifah Mubarak Ghanem
- Date of birth: 30 October 1993 (age 33)
- Place of birth: Dubai, United Arab Emirates
- Height: 1.87 m (6 ft 1 1/2 in)
- Position: Defender

Youth career
- Al Nasr

Senior career*
Years	Team	Apps	(Gls)
2012–2020	Al Nasr	93	(3)
2020	→ Shabab Al-Ahli (loan)	0	(0)
2020–2022	Shabab Al-Ahli	0	(0)
2021–2022	→ Khor Fakkan (loan)	12	(0)
2022–2024	Khor Fakkan	26	(0)

International career^{‡}
2017–2020	United Arab Emirates	15	(0)
- * Club domestic league appearances and goals ‡ National team caps and goals as of 21 January 2019

Khalifah Mubarak (Arabic: خليفة مبارك) (born 30 October 1993) is an Emirati footballer who currently plays as a defender.
