= Sayed Shubbar Alawi =

Bahraini footballer

Personal information
- Full name: Sayed Shubbar Ebrahim Alawi Hashem
- Date of birth: 11 August 1985 (age 41)
- Place of birth: Manama, Bahrain
- Height: 1.83 m (6 ft 0 in)
- Position: Goalkeeper

Team information
- Current team: Al-Riffa
- Number: 20

Senior career*
Years	Team	Apps	(Gls)
2003–2005	Al Ettihad		
2005–2013	Busaiteen Club		
2012	→ Saham Club (loan)		
2013–2016	Al-Riffa		
2016–2019	Al-Najma		
2019–2021	Al-Riffa		
2021–	Al Khaldiya		

International career
2009–2022	Bahrain	27	(0)
- * Club domestic league appearances and goals

Sayed Shubbar Ebrahim Alawi Hashem (Arabic: سيد شبر إبراهيم علوي هاشم; born 11 August 1985) is a football player who plays for Al Khaldiya and Bahrain national football team as a goalkeeper.

== International career ==
Alawi made his senior international debut on 23 March 2009 in a 5–2 friendly victory over Zimbabwe. In December 2018, Alawi was included in Bahrain's squad for the 2019 AFC Asian Cup.

== Career statistics ==
=== International ===
Appearances and goals by national team and year
National team	Year	Apps	Goals
Bahrain	2009	2	0
Bahrain	2010	–	
Bahrain	2011	–	
Bahrain	2012	–	
Bahrain	2013	–	
Bahrain	2014	–	
Bahrain	2015	–	
Bahrain	2016	–	
Bahrain	2017	6	0
Bahrain	2018	8	0
Bahrain	2019	7	0
Bahrain	2020	1	0
Bahrain	2021	2	0
Bahrain	2022	1	0
Total		27	0
