= Chris Beath =

Australian soccer referee

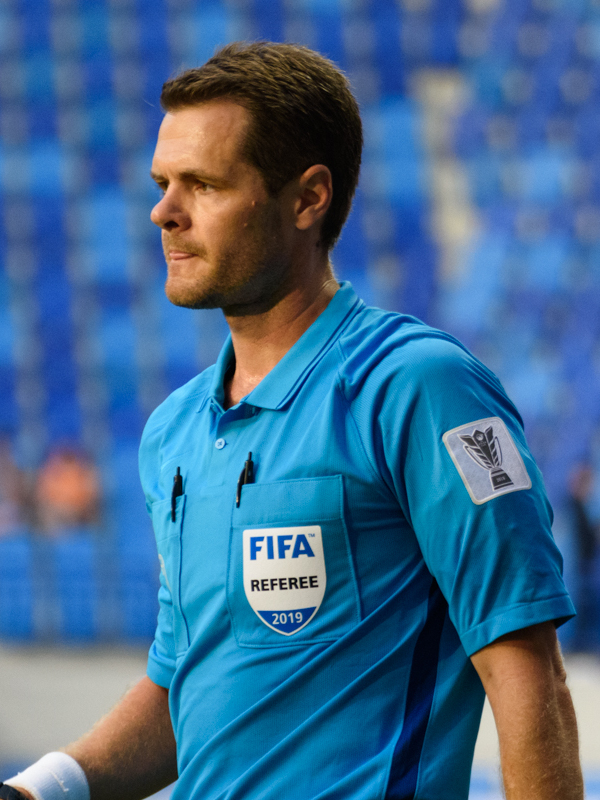
- Beath refereeing ฺBahrain vs. Thailand in 2019 Asian Cup
- Full name: Chris James Beath
- Born: 17 November 1984 (age 42)
- Other occupation: Finance Director

Domestic
Years	League	Role
2005–2023	A-League Men	Referee

International
Years	League	Role
2011–2023	FIFA listed	Referee

Chris James Beath (born 17 November 1984) is an Australian former football referee in the A-League.

== Refereeing career ==
He has refereed at the National Youth Championships in 2003 and in 2004.

Beath was the referee of the tournament at the 2002 Kanga Cup.

Beath was added to the FIFA International Referees List in 2011, serving as a referee for matches including the Kirin Challenge Cup contest between Japan and Iceland.

In 2015, Beath was involved in an exchange program where he refereed in the J-League.

On 4 April 2017, Chris Beath was appointed as one of the inaugural video assistant referees (VARs) in the Hyundai A-League, the first top-tier football league in the world to implement the technology.

In January 2018, Beath was selected as one of the referees for the 2018 AFC U-23 Championship held in China. Beath refereed the opening fixture of this tournament.

On 5 December 2018, Beath was appointed to be a referee at the 2019 AFC Asian Cup in the United Arab Emirates.

In August 2021, after the matches Mexico - France (4–1) and the quarter final Brazil - Egypt (1–0), Beath was appointed to the Brazil vs Spain 2-1 after extra time Gold Medal Match at the COVID delayed 2020 Summer Olympics.

Beath was also appointed to officiate in the 2021 FIFA Club World Cup. He refereed Al Ahly SC victory 1–0 over C. F. Monterrey and also officiated the 2021 FIFA Club World Cup Final between Chelsea F.C. and Palmeiras.

In 2022, Beath was appointed to the 2022 AFC Cup Final as VAR.

Beath was selected to officiate at the 2022 FIFA World Cup in Qatar, officiating the Group C match between Mexico and Poland.

Beath announced his retirement from refereeing on 1 June 2023, shortly after being appointed as the referee for the 2023 A-League Men Grand Final, which was his final game as a referee. He holds the record for matches officiated in the A-League, taking charge of 234 games in total.

== A-League Career ==
Matches:

== Record ==
2019 AFC Asian Cup – United Arab Emirates
Date	Match	Venue	Round
10 January 2019	Bahrain 0–1 Thailand	Dubai	Group stage
17 January 2019	Lebanon 4–1 North Korea	Sharjah	Group stage
28 January 2019	Iran 0–3 Japan	Al Ain	Semi-final

2022 FIFA World Cup – Qatar
Date	Match	Venue	Round
22 November 2022	Mexico 0–0 Poland	Doha	Group stage

Sporting positions (Australia) Chris Beath
Preceded by (Uruguay) Esteban Ostojich	2021 FIFA Club World Cup Final Referee	Succeeded by (England) Anthony Taylor
Preceded by 2016 (Iran) Alireza Faghani	2020 FIFA Men's Olympic Football Tournament Final Referee	Succeeded by 2024 (Brazil) Ramon Abatti
