= Sami Al-Husaini =

Bahraini footballer

Personal information
- Full name: Sami Mohamed Saeed Al Husaini
- Date of birth: 29 September 1989 (age 37)
- Place of birth: Manama, Bahrain
- Height: 1.74 m (5 ft 9 in)
- Position: Striker

Team information
- Current team: East Riffa

Youth career
- –2010: East Riffa

Senior career*
Years	Team	Apps	(Gls)
2010–2011	East Riffa	17	(1)
2011–2015	Al-Busaiteen	66	(4)
2015–	East Riffa		

International career^{‡}
2011–	Bahrain	67	(8)
- * Club domestic league appearances and goals as of 14 June 2018 ‡ National team caps and goals as of 22 January 2019

Sami Al-Husaini (Arabic: سامي الحسيني; born 29 September 1989) is a Bahraini professional footballer who plays as a striker for Al-Busaiteen.

== International career ==
=== International goals ===
Scores and results list Bahrain's goal tally first.

Goal	Date	Venue	Opponent	Score	Result	Competition
1.	10 December 2011	Jassim Bin Hamad Stadium, Doha, Qatar	Qatar	1–2	2–2	2011 Pan Arab Games
2.	10 December 2011	Jassim Bin Hamad Stadium, Doha, Qatar	Qatar	2–2	2–2	2011 Pan Arab Games
3.	2 November 2014	Bahrain National Stadium, Riffa, Bahrain	North Korea	1–0	2–2	Friendly
4.	7 November 2014	Bahrain National Stadium, Riffa, Bahrain	Singapore	2–0	2–0	Friendly
5.	30 December 2014	Simonds Stadium, Geelong, Australia	Saudi Arabia	2–0	4–1	Friendly
6.	8 September 2015	Grand Hamad Stadium, Doha, Qatar	Yemen	2–0	4–0	2018 FIFA World Cup qualification
7.	9 November 2017	Mong Kok Stadium, Mong Kok, Hong Kong	Hong Kong	2–0	2–0	Friendly
8.	20 December 2018	Khalifa Sports City Stadium, Isa Town, Bahrain	Tajikistan	5–0	5–0	Friendly
