= Ryuji Sato =

Japanese football referee

Ryuji Sato 佐藤 隆治
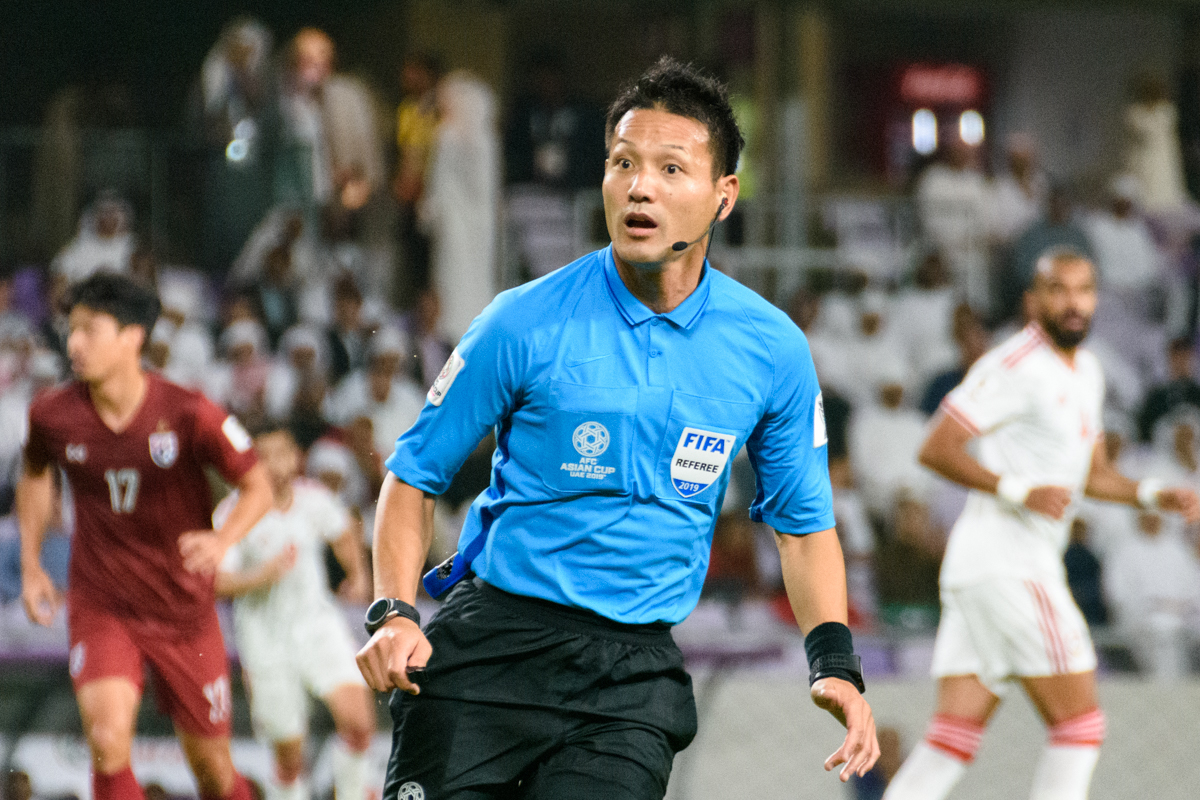
- Full name: Ryuji Sato
- Born: 16 April 1977 (age 49); Nagoya, Aichi Prefecture, Japan

Domestic
Years	League	Role
2007–2022	J1 League	Referee

International
Years	League	Role
2009–2022	FIFA listed	Referee

Ryuji Sato (佐藤 隆治, Satō Ryūji; born 16 April 1977) is a former Japanese football referee. He has officiated matches in the J1 League, AFC Champions League and FIFA World Cup qualifiers and is currently a director of referees in the J.League.

== Controversy ==
The 2022 AFF Championship Group B match between Malaysia and Vietnam was marred by controversy when Sato made a sudden controversial decision to award a penalty to Vietnam following a clash between Malaysia's Azam Azmi and Vietnam's Đoàn Văn Hậu outside the penalty box which saw Azam being sent off, although he ignored a similar foul made by Văn Hậu towards Azam. A complaint was made by the Football Association of Malaysia (FAM) towards the ASEAN Football Federation (AFF) regarding the "perceived biasedness of Sato's officiating conduct" since a similar incident had also occurred before in another Malaysia-Vietnam encounter during 2022 FIFA World Cup qualification held in the United Arab Emirates. Through the letter, the FAM requested Sato to never officiate any matches involving Malaysia in the future. Nevertheless, earlier before the controversial decision was made, Sato announced that 2022 would be the last year of his refereeing career when he announced his retirement by the end of the year.

On 3 January 2023, the AFF responded to the FAM's letter by giving Azam a two-match ban, where he would miss Malaysia's last group stage match against Singapore and the semi-final first leg against Thailand. Azam also needed to pay a fine of US$1,000 that must be settled in 30 days. The decisions were not appealable.

== AFC Asian Cup matches ==
2019 AFC Asian Cup – United Arab Emirates
Date	Match	Venue	Round
7 January 2019	Iran – Yemen	Abu Dhabi	Group stage
14 January 2019	United Arab Emirates – Thailand	Al Ain	Group stage
22 January 2019	South Korea – Bahrain	Dubai	Round of 16
25 January 2019	United Arab Emirates – Australia	Al Ain	Quarter-finals
