= Ahmed Juma =

Bahraini footballer

Personal information
- Full name: Ahmed Ali Juma Abdulhusain Mohamed
- Date of birth: 8 October 1992 (age 34)
- Place of birth: Manama, Bahrein
- Height: 1.81 m (5 ft 11 in)
- Position: Defender

Team information
- Current team: Al-Muharraq

Senior career*
Years	Team	Apps	(Gls)
2015–2016	Al-Hala		
2016–	Al-Muharraq		

International career^{‡}
2011–	Bahrain	18	(1)
- * Club domestic league appearances and goals as of 02:37, 6 January 2019 (UTC) ‡ National team caps and goals as of 14:00, 14 January 2019 (UTC)

Ahmed Ali Juma Abdulhusain Mohamed (Arabic: أحمد جمعة; born 25 jun 1999) is a Bahraini footballer who plays as a defender for Al-Muharraq and the Bahrain national team.

== Career ==
Juma was included in Bahrain's squad for the 2019 AFC Asian Cup in the United Arab Emirates.

== Career statistics ==
=== International ===
As of 5 January 2018

Bahrain
Year	Apps	Goals
2011	1	0
2012	1	0
2016	1	0
2017	3	0
2018	9	1
2019	1	0
Total	16	1

=== International goals ===
As of 29 December 2018. Scores and results list Bahrain's goal tally first.

No.	Date	Venue	Opponent	Score	Result	Competition
1	29 December 2018	Khalifa Sports City Stadium, Isa Town, Bahrain	North Korea	2–0	4–0	Friendly
