= Sayed Redha Isa =

Bahraini footballer

Personal information
- Full name: Sayed Redha Isa Hasan Radhi Hashim
- Date of birth: 7 August 1994 (age 32)
- Place of birth: Bahrain
- Height: 1.75 m (5 ft 9 in)
- Position: Midfielder

Team information
- Current team: Al-Riffa
- Number: 26

Senior career*
Years	Team	Apps	(Gls)
2015–2018	Malkiya		
2018–	Al-Riffa		

International career^{‡}
2016–	Bahrain	62	(3)
- * Club domestic league appearances and goals as of 13:23, 5 January 2019 (UTC) ‡ National team caps and goals as of 13:23, 26 January 2024 (UTC)

Sayed Redha Isa Hasan Radhi Hashim (Arabic: سَيِّد رِضَا عِيسَى حَسَن رَضِيّ هَاشِم; born 7 August 1994) is a Bahraini footballer who plays as a midfielder for Al-Riffa and the Bahrain national team.

== Career ==
Isa was included in Bahrain's squad for the 2019 AFC Asian Cup in the United Arab Emirates.

== Career statistics ==
=== International ===
As of 26 January 2024

Bahrain
Year	Apps	Goals
2016	1	0
2017	11	0
2018	10	3
2019	12	0
2020	3	0
2021	11	0
2022	9	0
2023	5	0
2024	0	0
Total	62	3

=== International goals ===
As of 10 November 2017. Scores and results list Bahrain's goal tally first.

No.	Date	Venue	Opponent	Score	Result	Competition
1	27 March 2018	Bahrain National Stadium, Riffa, Bahrain	Turkmenistan	3–0	4–0	2019 AFC Asian Cup qualification
2	6 September 2018	Bahrain National Stadium, Riffa, Bahrain	Philippines	1–1	1–1	Friendly
3	16 October 2018	Bahrain National Stadium, Riffa, Bahrain	Myanmar	4–1	4–1	Friendly
