= 2019 AFC Asian Cup knockout stage =

The knockout stage of the 2019 AFC Asian Cup was the second and final stage of the competition, following the group stage. It began on 20 January with the round of 16 and ended on 1 February with the final match, held at the Zayed Sports City Stadium in Abu Dhabi. A total of 16 teams (the top two teams from each group, along with the four best third-placed teams) advanced to the knockout stage to compete in a single-elimination style tournament.

All times are local, GST (UTC+4).

== Format ==
In the knockout stage, if a match is level at the end of 90 minutes of normal playing time, extra time was played (two periods of 15 minutes each). If still tied after extra time, the match was decided by a penalty shoot-out to determine the winner. The video assistant referee (VAR) system was used from the quarter-finals onwards. For the first time since a knockout stage was added to the competition in 1972, there was no third place play-off.

The AFC set out the following schedule for the round of 16:

- R16-1: Runners-up Group A v Runners-up Group C
- R16-2: Winners Group D v 3rd Group B/E/F
- R16-3: Winners Group B v 3rd Group A/C/D
- R16-4: Winners Group F v Runners-up Group E
- R16-5: Winners Group C v 3rd Group A/B/F
- R16-6: Winners Group E v Runners-up Group D
- R16-7: Winners Group A v 3rd Group C/D/E
- R16-8: Runners-up Group B v Runners-up Group F

=== Combinations of matches in the round of 16 ===
The specific match-ups involving the third-placed teams depended on which four third-placed teams qualified for the round of 16:

Combination according to the four qualified teams

Third-placed teams qualify from groups						1A vs	1B vs	1C vs	1D vs
A	B	C	D			3C	3D	3A	3B
A	B	C		E		3C	3A	3B	3E
A	B	C			F	3C	3A	3B	3F
A	B		D	E		3D	3A	3B	3E
A	B		D		F	3D	3A	3B	3F
A	B			E	F	3E	3A	3B	3F
A		C	D	E		3C	3D	3A	3E
A		C	D		F	3C	3D	3A	3F
A		C		E	F	3C	3A	3F	3E
A			D	E	F	3D	3A	3F	3E
	B	C	D	E		3C	3D	3B	3E
	B	C	D		F	3C	3D	3B	3F
	B	C		E	F	3E	3C	3B	3F
	B		D	E	F	3E	3D	3B	3F
		C	D	E	F	3C	3D	3F	3E

== Qualified teams ==
The top two placed teams from each of the six groups, plus the four best-placed third teams, qualified for the knockout stage.

Group	Winners	Runners-up	Third-placed teams (Best four qualified)
A	United Arab Emirates	Thailand	Bahrain
B	Jordan	Australia	—N/a
C	South Korea	China	Kyrgyzstan
D	Iran	Iraq	Vietnam
E	Qatar	Saudi Arabia	—N/a
F	Japan	Uzbekistan	Oman

== Bracket ==
Round of 16
20 January – Al Ain (HBZ)
Thailand	1
China	2
20 January – Abu Dhabi (MBZ)
Iran	2
Oman	0
20 January – Dubai (Al Maktoum)
Jordan	1 (2)
Vietnam (p)	1 (4)
21 January – Sharjah
Japan	1
Saudi Arabia	0
22 January – Dubai (Rashid)
South Korea (a.e.t.)	2
Bahrain	1
22 January – Abu Dhabi (Al Nahyan)
Qatar	1
Iraq	0
21 January – Abu Dhabi (Zayed Sports)
United Arab Emirates (a.e.t.)	3
Kyrgyzstan	2
21 January – Al Ain (KBZ)
Australia (p)	0 (4)
Uzbekistan	0 (2)

Quarter-finals
24 January – Abu Dhabi (MBZ)
China	0
Iran	3
24 January – Dubai (Al Maktoum)
Vietnam	0
Japan	1
25 January – Abu Dhabi (Zayed Sports)
South Korea	0
Qatar	1
25 January – Al Ain (HBZ)
United Arab Emirates	1
Australia	0

Semi-finals
28 January – Al Ain (HBZ)
Iran	0
Japan	3
29 January – Abu Dhabi (MBZ)
Qatar	4
United Arab Emirates	0

Final
1 February – Abu Dhabi (Zayed Sports)
Japan	1
Qatar	3

== Round of 16 ==
=== Jordan vs Vietnam ===
The two had already faced each other in previous qualification phases, with all of their matches ending in draws.

Jordan came close in the 20th minute when Musa Al-Taamari lured three defenders out of position before his back-heel pass found Feras Shelbaieh, whose cross to Yaseen Al-Bakhit saw his effort going wide. In the 35th minute, Đoàn Văn Hậu's left-footed strike was parried away by Amer Shafi. Jordan took the lead in the 38th minute after Đỗ Hùng Dũng brought Salem Al-Ajalin down just outside the box. Baha' Abdel-Rahman scored from the resulting free kick into the top right corner of the net. Six minutes into the second half, Nguyễn Trọng Hoàng sent in a curling cross in front of the goal, which Nguyễn Công Phượng squeezed past the Jordanian defenders for the equaliser. Neither side managed to find a way to score in the remaining minutes, forcing the first ever AFC Asian Cup last 16 tie to go into extra time. However, both teams were unwilling to take unnecessary risks, as penalties were needed to decide the tie.

Jordan were the first to miss, with Baha' Faisal striking the crossbar, which was then followed by Ahmed Samir's effort saved by Đặng Văn Lâm. Vietnam's Trần Minh Vương also missed but Bùi Tiến Dũng made no mistake as the Southeast Asian side advanced to the quarter-finals.

The win meant that since reunification, Vietnam had reached the quarter-finals in all their two Asian Cups they participated, but this was also the country's first ever win in the knockout stage, though technically it was a draw. For Jordan, the loss meant they have never won any competitive knockout stage games in their Asian Cup history.

20 January 2019
15:00

Jordan	1–1 (a.e.t.)	Vietnam
Abdel-Rahman 39'	Report	Nguyễn Công Phượng 51'
Penalties
Abdel-Rahman (penalty scored); Faisal (penalty missed); Samir (penalty missed); Ersan (penalty scored)	2–4	(penalty scored) Quế Ngọc Hải; (penalty scored) Đỗ Hùng Dũng; (penalty scored) Lương Xuân Trường; (penalty missed) Trần Minh Vương; (penalty scored) Bùi Tiến Dũng

Al Maktoum Stadium, Dubai
Attendance: 14,205
Referee: Alireza Faghani (Iran)

Jordan	Vietnam

GK	1	Amer Shafi (c)
RB	2	Feras Shelbaieh
CB	3	Tareq Khattab
CB	21	Salem Al-Ajalin
LB	19	Anas Bani Yaseen
CM	6	Saeed Murjan		(substituted off) 71'
CM	4	Baha' Abdel-Rahman
RW	18	Musa Al-Taamari		(substituted off) 98'
AM	7	Yousef Al-Rawashdeh		(substituted off) 105+2'
LW	13	Khalil Bani Attiah	(yellow card) 57'
CF	11	Yaseen Al-Bakhit		(substituted off) 98'
Substitutions:
FW	9	Baha' Faisal		(substituted on) 71'
DF	23	Ihsan Haddad		(substituted on) 98'
FW	14	Ahmad Ersan		(substituted on) 98'
MF	10	Ahmed Samir		(substituted on) 105+2'
Manager:
(Belgium) Vital Borkelmans

GK	23	Đặng Văn Lâm
CB	2	Đỗ Duy Mạnh
CB	3	Quế Ngọc Hải (c)
CB	4	Bùi Tiến Dũng
RM	8	Nguyễn Trọng Hoàng	(substituted off) 117'
CM	7	Nguyễn Huy Hùng	(substituted off) 96'
CM	16	Đỗ Hùng Dũng
LM	5	Đoàn Văn Hậu
RF	19	Nguyễn Quang Hải
CF	10	Nguyễn Công Phượng	(substituted off) 77'
LF	20	Phan Văn Đức	(substituted off) 105+1'
Substitutions:
FW	22	Nguyễn Tiến Linh	(substituted on) 77'
FW	9	Nguyễn Văn Toàn	(substituted on) 96'
MF	6	Lương Xuân Trường	(substituted on) 105+1'
MF	14	Trần Minh Vương	(substituted on) 117'
Manager:
(South Korea) Park Hang-seo

Man of the Match:
Nguyễn Quang Hải (Vietnam)

Assistant referees:
Reza Sokhandan (Iran)
Mohammadreza Mansouri (Iran)
Fourth official:
Abu Bakar Al-Amri (Oman)
Additional assistant referees:
Mohanad Qassim (Iraq)
Liu Kwok Man (Hong Kong)

=== Thailand vs China PR ===
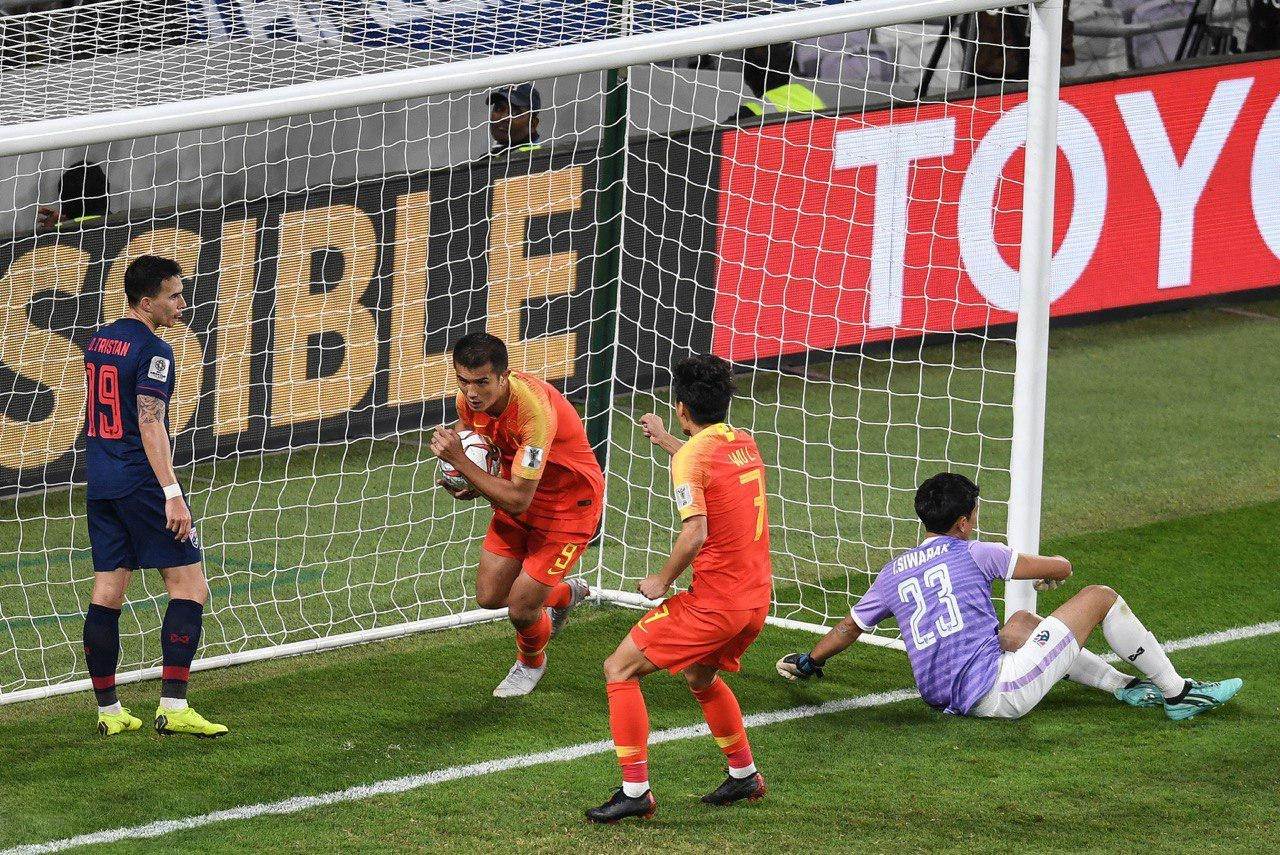
Chinese players after their first goal

China PR have only faced Thailand once in the AFC Asian Cup, back in 1992 which ended in a 1–1 draw.

In the 31st minute, Thitipan Puangchan's shot ended up at Supachai Jaided's feet, who turned and scored from seven yards to open the scoring. However, Yu Dabao made way for Xiao Zhi and within three minutes, China were level as Zheng Zhi clipped his cross in from the right and Xiao scored on the rebound after Siwarak Tedsungnoen had saved the striker's initial downward header. By the 71st minute, China were in front when Gao Lin scored from the spot after Tanaboon Kesarat clipped his heels in the area. Gao fired high into the top corner to give China the lead. A flying save from Yan Junling deep into injury time following Pansa Hemviboon's shot ensured the East Asian representative to win their first knockout stage match since 2004 and progress to the next round.

20 January 2019
18:00

Thailand	1–2	China
Supachai 31'	Report	Xiao Zhi 67'; Gao Lin 71' (pen.)

Hazza bin Zayed Stadium, Al Ain
Attendance: 8,026
Referee: Mohammed Abdulla Hassan Mohamed (United Arab Emirates)

Thailand	China PR

GK	23	Siwarak Tedsungnoen
RB	4	Chalermpong Kerdkaew
CB	16	Mika Chunuonsee
CB	6	Pansa Hemviboon
LB	17	Tanaboon Kesarat	(yellow card) 43'	(substituted off) 81'
CM	19	Tristan Do
CM	8	Thitipan Puangchan	(yellow card) 8'
CM	3	Theerathon Bunmathan
AM	18	Chanathip Songkrasin
CF	22	Supachai Jaided	(yellow card) 45'	(substituted off) 63'
CF	10	Teerasil Dangda (c)
Substitutions:
FW	12	Chananan Pombuppha		(substituted on) 63'
MF	21	Pokklaw Anan		(substituted on) 81'
Manager:
Sirisak Yodyardthai

GK	1	Yan Junling
RB	5	Zhang Linpeng	(yellow card) 34'
CB	6	Feng Xiaoting
CB	4	Shi Ke	(yellow card) 61'
LB	19	Liu Yang		(substituted off) 64'
CM	11	Hao Junmin
CM	10	Zheng Zhi (c)
CM	15	Wu Xi	(yellow card) 35'	(substituted off) 82'
AM	7	Wu Lei
CF	18	Gao Lin
CF	22	Yu Dabao		(substituted off) 64'
Substitutions:
FW	9	Xiao Zhi		(substituted on) 64'
MF	16	Jin Jingdao	(yellow card) 88'	(substituted on) 64'
MF	8	Zhao Xuri		(substituted on) 82'
Manager:
(Italy) Marcello Lippi

Man of the Match:
Feng Xiaoting (China PR)

Assistant referees:
Mohamed Al-Hammadi (United Arab Emirates)
Hasan Al-Mahri (United Arab Emirates)
Fourth official:
Palitha Hemathunga (Sri Lanka)
Additional assistant referees:
Ammar Al-Jeneibi (United Arab Emirates)
Hettikamkanamge Perera (Sri Lanka)

=== Iran vs Oman ===
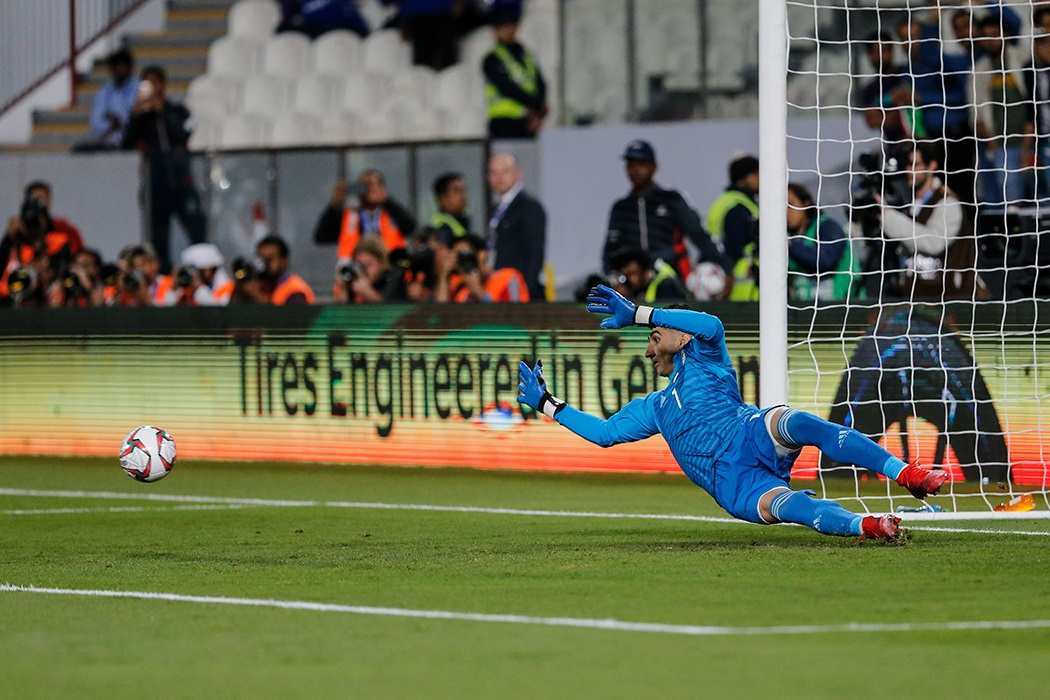
Alireza Beiranvand saving Oman's penalty

Iran and Oman had only met once in the tournament, a 2–2 draw back in 2004.

Oman were awarded a penalty in the third minute when Majid Hosseini brought down Muhsen Al-Ghassani, only for Iran goalkeeper Alireza Beiranvand to tip Ahmed Kano’s effort from 12 yards around the post. Iran broke the deadlock in the 32nd minute, Alireza Jahanbakhsh fired home after Mohammed Al-Musalami had failed to cut out Milad Mohammadi’s long ball. Nine minutes later, Mehdi Taremi was brought down in the area by Saad Al-Mukhaini and Ashkan Dejagah stepped up to convert the resulting penalty. Eight minutes after the restart, Sardar Azmoun missed the target from 12 yards when Taremi’s long throw arrived at his feet. Harib Al-Saadi fizzed a 77th minute shot inches over Beiranvand’s bar. Iran held firm to confirm their place in the quarter-finals.

20 January 2019
21:00

Iran	2–0	Oman
Jahanbakhsh 32'; Dejagah 41' (pen.)	Report

Mohammed bin Zayed Stadium, Abu Dhabi
Attendance: 31,945
Referee: César Ramos (Mexico)

Iran	Oman

GK	1	Alireza Beiranvand
RB	23	Ramin Rezaeian
CB	8	Morteza Pouraliganji
CB	19	Majid Hosseini	(yellow card) 2'
LB	5	Milad Mohammadi
DM	9	Omid Ebrahimi
RM	21	Ashkan Dejagah (c)		(substituted off) 78'
LM	11	Vahid Amiri	(yellow card) 65'
AM	18	Alireza Jahanbakhsh		(substituted off) 69'
CF	17	Mehdi Taremi
CF	20	Sardar Azmoun		(substituted off) 88'
Substitutions:
MF	4	Rouzbeh Cheshmi		(substituted on) 69'
MF	14	Saman Ghoddos		(substituted on) 78'
MF	7	Masoud Shojaei		(substituted on) 88'
Manager:
(Portugal) Carlos Queiroz

GK	18	Faiz Al-Rushaidi
RB	11	Saad Al-Mukhaini
CB	13	Khalid Al-Braiki
CB	2	Mohammed Al-Musalami	(yellow card) 59'
LB	17	Ali Al-Busaidi
CM	12	Ahmed Kano (c)		(substituted off) 81'
CM	23	Harib Al-Saadi
RW	15	Jameel Al-Yahmadi
AM	20	Salaah Al-Yahyaei		(substituted off) 46'
LW	6	Raed Ibrahim Saleh
CF	16	Muhsen Al-Ghassani		(substituted off) 88'
Substitutions:
FW	7	Khalid Al-Hajri		(substituted on) 46'
MF	10	Mohsin Al-Khaldi		(substituted on) 81'
FW	9	Mohammed Al-Ghassani		(substituted on) 88'
Manager:
(Netherlands) Pim Verbeek

Man of the Match:
Alireza Beiranvand (Iran)

Assistant referees:
Miguel Hernández (Mexico)
Alberto Morín (Mexico)
Fourth official:
Matthew Cream (Australia)
Additional assistant referees:
Chris Beath (Australia)
Ali Sabah (Iraq)

=== Japan vs Saudi Arabia ===
Japan and Saudi Arabia have met each other in four previous Asian Cup editions, with Japan holding the better record with only one loss and four wins.

Mohammed Al-Fatil sneaked in a header from the centre of the box from a set-piece situation, but the defender placed it wide of the mark. Japan came close six minutes later with Ritsu Dōan finding space in the danger area after collecting Takumi Minamino’s pass but saw his effort blocked by the Saudi defence. Japan scored the opening goal in the 20th minute as Takehiro Tomiyasu rose the highest to nod the ball home. With five minutes left in the half, Hattan Bahebri muscled his way into the box, but his curling shot flew past the right post, as Japan stayed ahead going into the break. In the second half, Maya Yoshida connected with a header from Gaku Shibasaki’s delivery but Mohammed Al-Owais collected it safely. In the 73rd minute, Abdullah Otayf found Housain Al-Mogahwi lurking in the box but the midfielder sent his header high above the bar as Japan soaked up the pressure to seal their quarter-final spot.

21 January 2019
15:00

Japan	1–0	Saudi Arabia
Tomiyasu 20'	Report

Sharjah Stadium, Sharjah
Attendance: 6,832
Referee: Ravshan Irmatov (Uzbekistan)

Japan	Saudi Arabia

GK	12	Shūichi Gonda
RB	19	Hiroki Sakai
CB	16	Takehiro Tomiyasu
CB	22	Maya Yoshida (c)
LB	5	Yuto Nagatomo
CM	6	Wataru Endo
CM	7	Gaku Shibasaki
RW	21	Ritsu Dōan		(substituted off) 89'
AM	9	Takumi Minamino		(substituted off) 77'
LW	8	Genki Haraguchi
CF	13	Yoshinori Muto	(yellow card) 39'	(substituted off) 90+2'
Substitutions:
FW	14	Junya Itō		(substituted on) 77'
DF	18	Tsukasa Shiotani		(substituted on) 89'
FW	11	Koya Kitagawa		(substituted on) 90+2'
Manager:
Hajime Moriyasu

GK	21	Mohammed Al-Owais
RB	2	Mohammed Al-Breik
CB	23	Mohammed Al-Fatil
CB	4	Ali Al-Bulaihi
LB	13	Yasser Al-Shahrani	(yellow card) 81'
DM	14	Abdullah Otayf		(substituted off) 78'
CM	20	Abdulaziz Al-Bishi		(substituted off) 56'
CM	16	Housain Al-Mogahwi
RW	11	Hattan Bahebri		(substituted off) 88'
LW	10	Salem Al-Dawsari (c)
CF	19	Fahad Al-Muwallad	(yellow card) 55'
Substitutions:
MF	8	Yahya Al-Shehri		(substituted on) 56'
FW	9	Mohammed Al-Saiari		(substituted on) 78'
MF	18	Abdulrahman Ghareeb		(substituted on) 88'
Manager:
(Spain) Juan Antonio Pizzi

Man of the Match:
Takehiro Tomiyasu (Japan)

Assistant referees:
Abdukhamidullo Rasulov (Uzbekistan)
Jakhongir Saidov (Uzbekistan)
Fourth official:
Sergei Grishchenko (Kyrgyzstan)
Additional assistant referees:
Valentin Kovalenko (Uzbekistan)
Nawaf Shukralla (Bahrain)

=== Australia vs Uzbekistan ===
Eldor Shomurodov’s change of pace left Trent Sainsbury flat-footed in the penalty area, only for Mathew Ryan to deny the striker’s effort when in on the Australian goal. Two minutes before the half hour, Uzbekistan went close as Javokhir Sidikov let fly from distance, the ball going narrowly wide of Ryan’s right post. In the second half, Jamie Maclaren’s blocked shot looped up for Rhyan Grant to head into the hands of Ignatiy Nesterov while the full-back was also on the end of Milos Degenek’s diagonal ball, sending his header over the bar from an acute angle. Nesterov was on hand to push away Tom Rogic’s deflected effort 10 minutes from time. With the 90 minutes finishing goalless, the game went into extra time and Chris Ikonomidis, Mathew Leckie and Rogic all failed to break the deadlock for the defending champions, leaving the game to drift towards a shootout.

Nesterov saved Aziz Behich's penalty in the second round of the shootout before Islom Tukhtakhodjaev was denied by Ryan and, with Dostonbek Khamdamov missing in the penultimate round, Leckie struck to take Australia through.

21 January 2019
18:00

Australia	0–0 (a.e.t.)	Uzbekistan
	Report
Penalties
Milligan (penalty scored); Behich (penalty missed); Kruse (penalty scored); Giannou (penalty scored); Leckie (penalty scored)	4–2	(penalty scored) Shukurov; (penalty missed) Tukhtakhodjaev; (penalty scored) Alibaev; (penalty missed) Bikmaev

Khalifa bin Zayed Stadium, Al Ain
Attendance: 6,809
Referee: Abdulrahman Al-Jassim (Qatar)

Australia	Uzbekistan

GK	1	Mathew Ryan
RB	4	Rhyan Grant	(yellow card) 109'
CB	2	Milos Degenek
CB	5	Mark Milligan (c)
LB	16	Aziz Behich	(yellow card) 25'
CM	20	Trent Sainsbury
CM	22	Jackson Irvine
RW	21	Awer Mabil		(substituted off) 68'
AM	23	Tom Rogic	(yellow card) 20'	(substituted off) 111'
LW	15	Chris Ikonomidis		(substituted off) 96'
CF	9	Jamie Maclaren		(substituted off) 75'
Substitutions:
FW	7	Mathew Leckie		(substituted on) 68'
FW	14	Apostolos Giannou		(substituted on) 75'
FW	10	Robbie Kruse		(substituted on) 96'
MF	8	Massimo Luongo		(substituted on) 111'
Manager:
Graham Arnold

GK	1	Ignatiy Nesterov
RB	6	Davron Khashimov	(yellow card) 46'
CB	20	Islom Tukhtakhodjaev	(yellow card) 2'
CB	5	Anzur Ismailov
LB	13	Oleg Zoteev		(substituted off) 105'
RM	17	Dostonbek Khamdamov		(substituted off) 107'
CM	19	Otabek Shukurov
CM	22	Javokhir Sidikov		(substituted off) 73'
LM	11	Jaloliddin Masharipov
CF	14	Eldor Shomurodov		(substituted off) 104'
CF	9	Odil Ahmedov (c)
Substitutions:
MF	8	Ikromjon Alibaev		(substituted on) 73'
FW	10	Marat Bikmaev		(substituted on) 104'
DF	4	Farrukh Sayfiev		(substituted on) 105'
MF	16	Azizbek Turgunboev		(substituted on) 107'
Manager:
(Argentina) Héctor Cúper

Man of the Match:
Jackson Irvine (Australia)

Assistant referees:
Taleb Al-Marri (Qatar)
Saud Al-Maqaleh (Qatar)
Fourth official:
Palitha Hemathunga (Sri Lanka)
Additional assistant referees:
Khamis Al-Marri (Qatar)
Ahmed Al-Kaf (Oman)

=== United Arab Emirates vs Kyrgyzstan ===
The Emiratis went ahead in the 13th minute through a Khamis Esmaeel header from Ismail Matar’s corner. Kyrgyzstan bounced back shortly before the half-hour mark, Akhlidin Israilov’s pass found Mirlan Murzaev who rounded UAE goalkeeper Khalid Eisa and finished to draw his side level. Matar threatened to restore the UAE’s lead when he fizzed a shot from distance narrowly over as the first half drew to a close. After the break, Ali Mabkhout headed Bandar Al-Ahbabi’s cross inches wide of the post, before a curling Valery Kichin delivery thudded against Eisa’s crossbar with the custodian beaten. In the 64th minute, the UAE went ahead once again. This time, Mabkhout collected Amer Abdulrahman’s pass and shot the ball beyond Kutman Kadyrbekov. Tursunali Rustamov headed home a last gasp equaliser following Anton Zemlianukhin’s cross to send the match into extra-time.

Mabkhout spurned an early chance in the second minute of the additional 30, before just 60 seconds later, the striker was brought down in the area by Bekzhan Sagynbaev. Substitute Ahmed Khalil stepped up to convert the resulting penalty and put his side ahead yet again. Bakhtiyar Duyshobekov’s header then brushed the upright and Rustamov slammed a shot against the bar in the final seconds. However, the UAE held firm to seal their ticket to the last eight.

21 January 2019
21:00

United Arab Emirates	3–2 (a.e.t.)	Kyrgyzstan
Esmaeel 14'; Mabkhout 64'; Khalil 103' (pen.)	Report	Murzaev 26'; Rustamov 90+1'

Zayed Sports City Stadium, Abu Dhabi
Attendance: 17,784
Referee: Fu Ming (China PR)

United Arab Emirates	Kyrgyzstan

GK	17	Khalid Eisa
RB	9	Bandar Al-Ahbabi
CB	4	Khalifa Mubarak		(substituted off) 30'
CB	19	Ismail Ahmed
LB	18	Al Hassan Saleh
CM	13	Khamis Esmaeel	(yellow card) 78'
CM	2	Ali Salmeen
CM	5	Amer Abdulrahman		(substituted off) 98'
RF	21	Khalfan Mubarak		(substituted off) 62'
CF	7	Ali Mabkhout
LF	10	Ismail Matar (c)		(substituted off) 82'
Substitutions:
DF	6	Fares Juma		(substituted on) 30'
FW	15	Ismail Al Hammadi		(substituted on) 62'
DF	23	Mohamed Ahmed		(substituted on) 82'
FW	11	Ahmed Khalil		(substituted on) 98'
Manager:
(Italy) Alberto Zaccheroni

GK	13	Kutman Kadyrbekov
CB	4	Mustafa Iusupov
CB	3	Tamirlan Kozubaev
CB	2	Valery Kichin (c)
RWB	18	Kairat Zhyrgalbek Uulu	(yellow card) 8'
LWB	11	Bekzhan Sagynbaev	(yellow card) 23'
CM	9	Edgar Bernhardt		(substituted off) 64'
CM	21	Farhat Musabekov		(substituted off) 80'
AM	23	Akhlidin Israilov		(substituted off) 76'
SS	10	Mirlan Murzaev	(yellow card) 88'	(substituted off) 102'
CF	19	Vitalij Lux
Substitutions:
MF	8	Aziz Sydykov		(substituted on) 64'
MF	7	Tursunali Rustamov		(substituted on) 76'
MF	22	Anton Zemlianukhin		(substituted on) 80'
MF	20	Bakhtiyar Duyshobekov		(substituted on) 102'
Manager:
(Russia) Aleksandr Krestinin

Man of the Match:
Bandar Al-Ahbabi (United Arab Emirates)

Assistant referees:
Huo Weiming (China PR)
Cao Yi (China PR)
Fourth official:
Yoon Kwang-yeol (South Korea)
Additional assistant referees:
Ma Ning (China PR)
Ko Hyung-jin (South Korea)

=== South Korea vs Bahrain ===
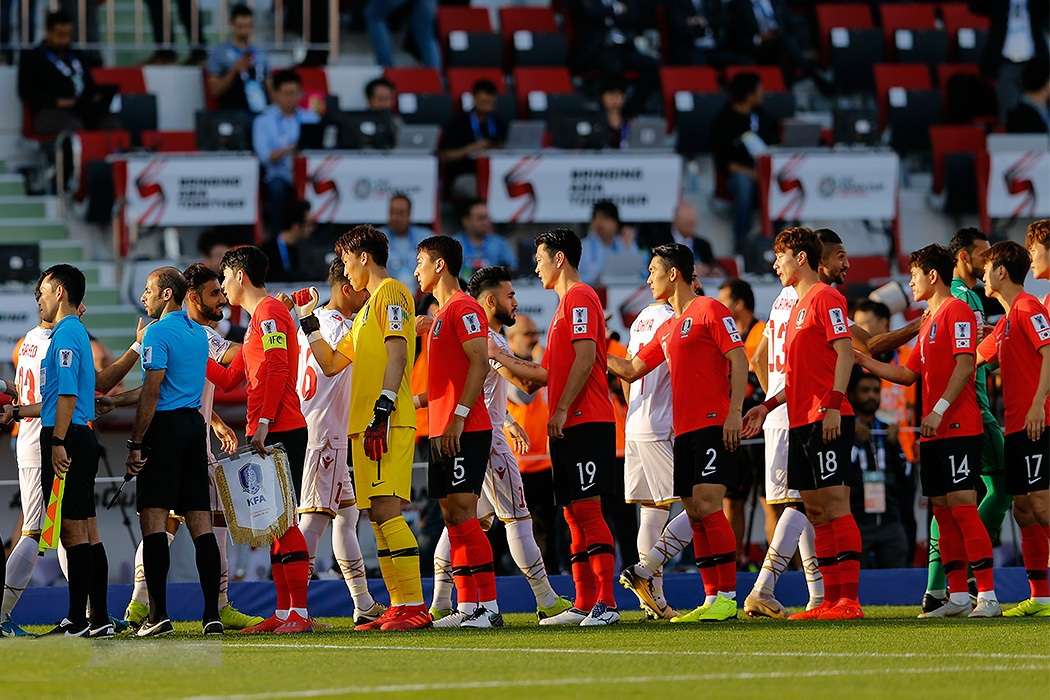
Bahrain and South Korea players before the match

Mohamed Marhoon forced Korean goalkeeper Kim Seung-gyu into a dive but his effort flew wide in the fourth minute. Two minutes from the half-time whistle, Son Heung-min laid a pass to Lee Yong on the right flank, who then sent the ball into the box which was blocked by goalkeeper Sayed Shubbar Alawi, only for it to land at Hwang Hee-chan’s feet who then tapped it into the net. In the 70th minute, the Korean defenders failed to cleanly clear a corner kick, allowing Jamal Rashid to fire a shot which seemed heading into the top right corner, only for Seung-gyu to palm it out. The Korean defence was breached for the first time in the tournament when Mohamed Al Romaihi slammed the ball into the net after Hong Chul had made a last ditch clearance of Mahdi Al-Humaidan’s attempt. Hwang Ui-jo intercepted a poor back pass in added time but his attempt to curl the ball past an onrushing Alawi went wide. The tie was then subsequently forced into extra-time.

Bahrain were caught off guard when Yong sent in a cross from the right which Kim Jin-su met with a header to seal his team's place in the quarter-finals.

22 January 2019
17:00

South Korea	2–1 (a.e.t.)	Bahrain
Hwang Hee-chan 43'; Kim Jin-su 105+2'	Report	Al Romaihi 77'

Rashid Stadium, Dubai
Attendance: 7,658
Referee: Ryuji Sato (Japan)

South Korea	Bahrain

GK	1	Kim Seung-gyu
RB	2	Lee Yong
CB	4	Kim Min-jae
CB	19	Kim Young-gwon
LB	14	Hong Chul	(substituted off) 96'
CM	6	Hwang In-beom	(substituted off) 89'
CM	5	Jung Woo-young
RW	11	Hwang Hee-chan	(substituted off) 80'
AM	17	Lee Chung-yong	(substituted off) 68'
LW	7	Son Heung-min (c)
CF	18	Hwang Ui-jo
Substitutions:
MF	8	Ju Se-jong	(substituted on) 68'
FW	9	Ji Dong-won	(substituted on) 80'
MF	12	Lee Seung-woo	(substituted on) 89'
DF	3	Kim Jin-su	(substituted on) 96'
Manager:
(Portugal) Paulo Bento

GK	1	Sayed Shubbar Alawi		(substituted off) 102'
RB	16	Sayed Redha Isa	(yellow card) 95'	(substituted off) 109'
CB	5	Hamad Al-Shamsan
CB	3	Waleed Al Hayam
LB	8	Mohamed Marhoon		(substituted off) 71'
CM	19	Kamil Al Aswad
CM	7	Abdulwahab Al-Safi (c)
RW	4	Sayed Dhiya Saeed
AM	23	Jamal Rashid
LW	11	Ali Madan	(yellow card) 25'	(substituted off) 57'
CF	13	Mohamed Al Romaihi
Substitutions:
FW	20	Sami Al-Husaini		(substituted on) 57'
FW	9	Mahdi Al-Humaidan		(substituted on) 71'
GK	22	Abdulkarim Fardan		(substituted on) 102'
FW	10	Abdulla Yusuf Helal		(substituted on) 109'
Manager:
(Czech Republic) Miroslav Soukup

Man of the Match:
Lee Yong (South Korea)

Assistant referees:
Hiroshi Yamauchi (Japan)
Jun Mihara (Japan)
Fourth official:
Anton Shchetinin (Australia)
Additional assistant referees:
Jumpei Iida (Japan)
Turki Al-Khudhayr (Saudi Arabia)

=== Qatar vs Iraq ===
Qatar spurned the first opportunity of the game when Abdelkarim Hassan rattled the bar with a shot from close-range following Abdulaziz Hatem’s cross in the fourth minute. Hatem came close to connecting with Abdelkarim’s whipped delivery, only for goalkeeper Saad Al-Sheeb to then dive at the feet of an onrushing Mohanad Ali to repel Iraq’s opening attack of the tie. Abdelkarim’s deflected cross brushed an upright and Bassam Al-Rawi headed Akram Afif’s corner wide of the target. Qatar went ahead on 62 minutes after Al-Rawi curled home a free-kick. Moments later, Jalal Hassan spread himself well to deny Abdelkarim, before producing another fine stop to keep out a Hatem drive from distance. Ali Adnan flashed a free-kick inches past the post and then Ahmad Ibrahim's 80th minute header missed by a similarly fine margin. Qatar held firm despite late Iraqi pressure to win their first ever knockout stage's match and moved on to the next round.

22 January 2019
20:00

Qatar	1–0	Iraq
Al-Rawi 62'	Report

Al Nahyan Stadium, Abu Dhabi
Attendance: 14,701
Referee: Muhammad Taqi (Singapore)

Qatar	Iraq

GK	1	Saad Al-Sheeb
RB	2	Ró-Ró
CB	15	Bassam Al-Rawi	(yellow card) 90+3'
CB	4	Tarek Salman
LB	3	Abdelkarim Hassan	(yellow card) 84'
CM	6	Abdulaziz Hatem
CM	23	Assim Madibo	(yellow card) 11'
CM	16	Boualem Khoukhi
RF	10	Hassan Al-Haydos (c)		(substituted off) 90'
CF	19	Almoez Ali
LF	11	Akram Afif
Substitutions:
MF	12	Karim Boudiaf		(substituted on) 90'
Manager:
(Spain) Félix Sánchez

GK	1	Jalal Hassan (c)
RB	17	Alaa Ali Mhawi		(substituted off) 71'
CB	2	Ahmad Ibrahim	(yellow card) 39'
CB	5	Ali Faez
LB	6	Ali Adnan
CM	7	Safaa Hadi	(yellow card) 86'
CM	14	Amjad Attwan	(yellow card) 73'
RW	16	Hussein Ali
AM	13	Bashar Resan
LW	11	Humam Tariq		(substituted off) 36'
CF	10	Mohanad Ali	(yellow card) 24'
Substitutions:
MF	15	Ali Husni		(substituted on) 36'	(substituted off) 66'
FW	19	Mohammed Dawood			(substituted on) 66'
DF	22	Rebin Sulaka		(substituted on) 71'
Manager:
(Slovenia) Srečko Katanec

Man of the Match:
Akram Afif (Qatar)

Assistant referees:
Ronnie Koh Min Kiat (Singapore)
Sergei Grishchenko (Kyrgyzstan)
Fourth official:
Rashid Al-Ghaithi (Oman)
Additional assistant referees:
Hettikamkanamge Perera (Sri Lanka)
Ahmed Al-Ali (Jordan)

== Quarter-finals ==
=== Vietnam vs Japan ===
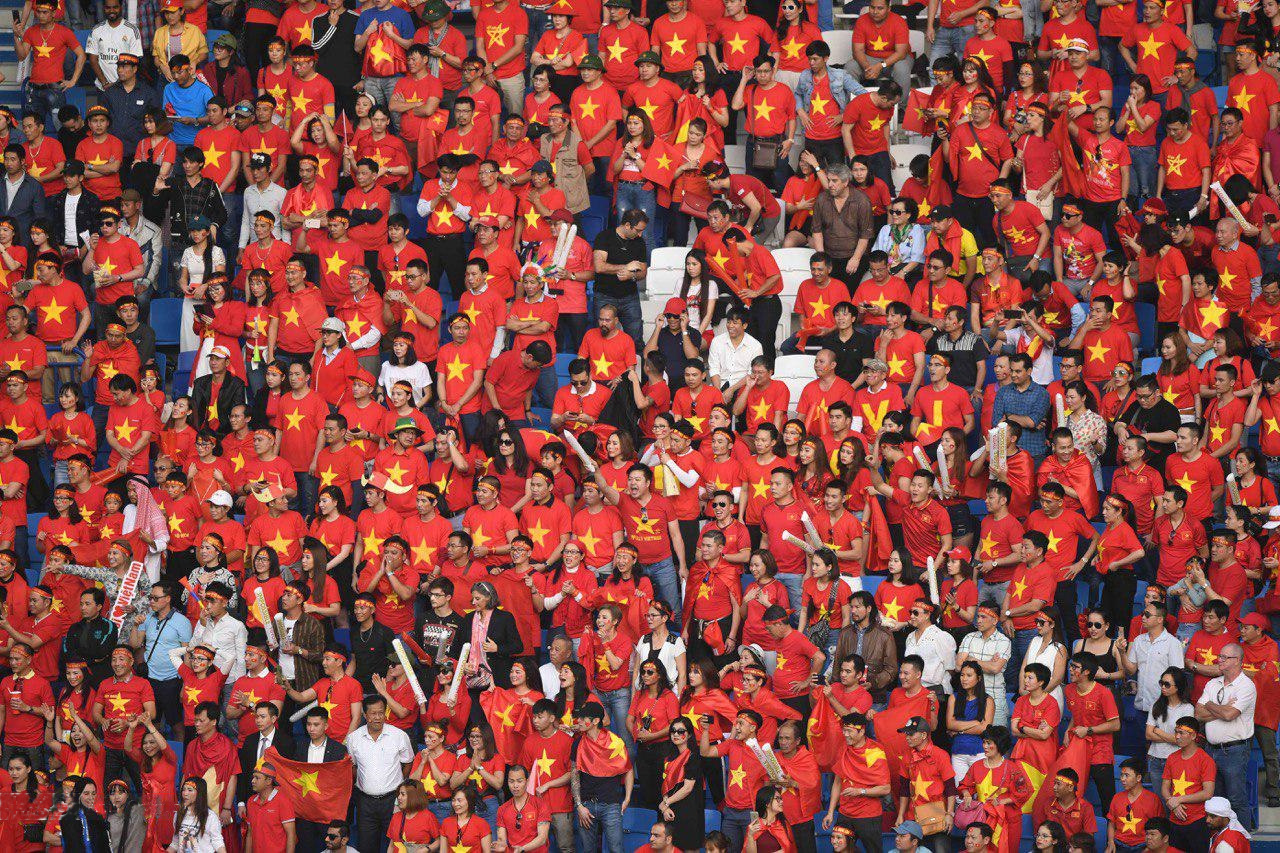
Vietnamese fans

Koya Kitagawa’s pass to Genki Haraguchi in the 23rd minute was slid out of play by Vietnamese defender Đỗ Duy Mạnh. The resulting corner saw Haraguchi send in a curler that found Maya Yoshida, who headed the ball into the back of the net. However, VAR was called into action for the first time in the history of the Asian Cup and much to Vietnam’s relief, Emirati referee Mohammed Abdulla Hassan Mohamed disallowed the goal as Yoshida’s header had deflected off his arm. Shūichi Gonda was forced into making his first save of the match as Phan Văn Đức came close with a 37th minute strike, before being called into action again a minute later to deny another close-range attempt from Văn Đức. Ritsu Dōan’s run was blocked by Bùi Tiến Dũng and the referee, after another VAR check, awarded a penalty which Doan converted in the 57th minute. Substitute Nguyễn Phong Hồng Duy came close to equalising in the 73rd minute, but his low drive missed the upright by mere inches.

24 January 2019
17:00

Vietnam	0–1	Japan
	Report	Dōan 57' (pen.)

Al Maktoum Stadium, Dubai
Attendance: 8,954
Referee: Mohammed Abdulla Hassan Mohamed (United Arab Emirates)

Vietnam	Japan

GK	23	Đặng Văn Lâm
CB	3	Quế Ngọc Hải (c)
CB	2	Đỗ Duy Mạnh
CB	4	Bùi Tiến Dũng	(yellow card) 56'
RM	8	Nguyễn Trọng Hoàng		(substituted off) 63'
CM	7	Nguyễn Huy Hùng		(substituted off) 54'
CM	16	Đỗ Hùng Dũng
LM	5	Đoàn Văn Hậu	(yellow card) 60'
RF	19	Nguyễn Quang Hải
CF	10	Nguyễn Công Phượng
LF	20	Phan Văn Đức		(substituted off) 75'
Substitutions:
FW	9	Nguyễn Văn Toàn		(substituted on) 54'
MF	12	Nguyễn Phong Hồng Duy		(substituted on) 63'
MF	6	Lương Xuân Trường		(substituted on) 75'
Manager:
(South Korea) Park Hang-seo

GK	12	Shūichi Gonda
RB	19	Hiroki Sakai
CB	16	Takehiro Tomiyasu
CB	22	Maya Yoshida (c)
LB	5	Yuto Nagatomo
CM	7	Gaku Shibasaki
CM	6	Wataru Endo
RW	21	Ritsu Dōan
AM	9	Takumi Minamino	(substituted off) 89'
LW	8	Genki Haraguchi	(substituted off) 79'
CF	11	Koya Kitagawa	(substituted off) 72'
Substitutions:
FW	15	Yuya Osako	(substituted on) 72'
FW	10	Takashi Inui	(substituted on) 79'
DF	18	Tsukasa Shiotani	(substituted on) 89'
Manager:
Hajime Moriyasu

Man of the Match:
Ritsu Dōan (Japan)

Assistant referees:
Mohamed Al-Hammadi (United Arab Emirates)
Hasan Al-Mahri (United Arab Emirates)
Fourth official:
Ammar Al-Jeneibi (United Arab Emirates)
Video assistant referee:
Chris Beath (Australia)
Assistant video assistant referees:
Muhammad Taqi (Singapore)
Paolo Valeri (Italy)

=== China PR vs Iran ===
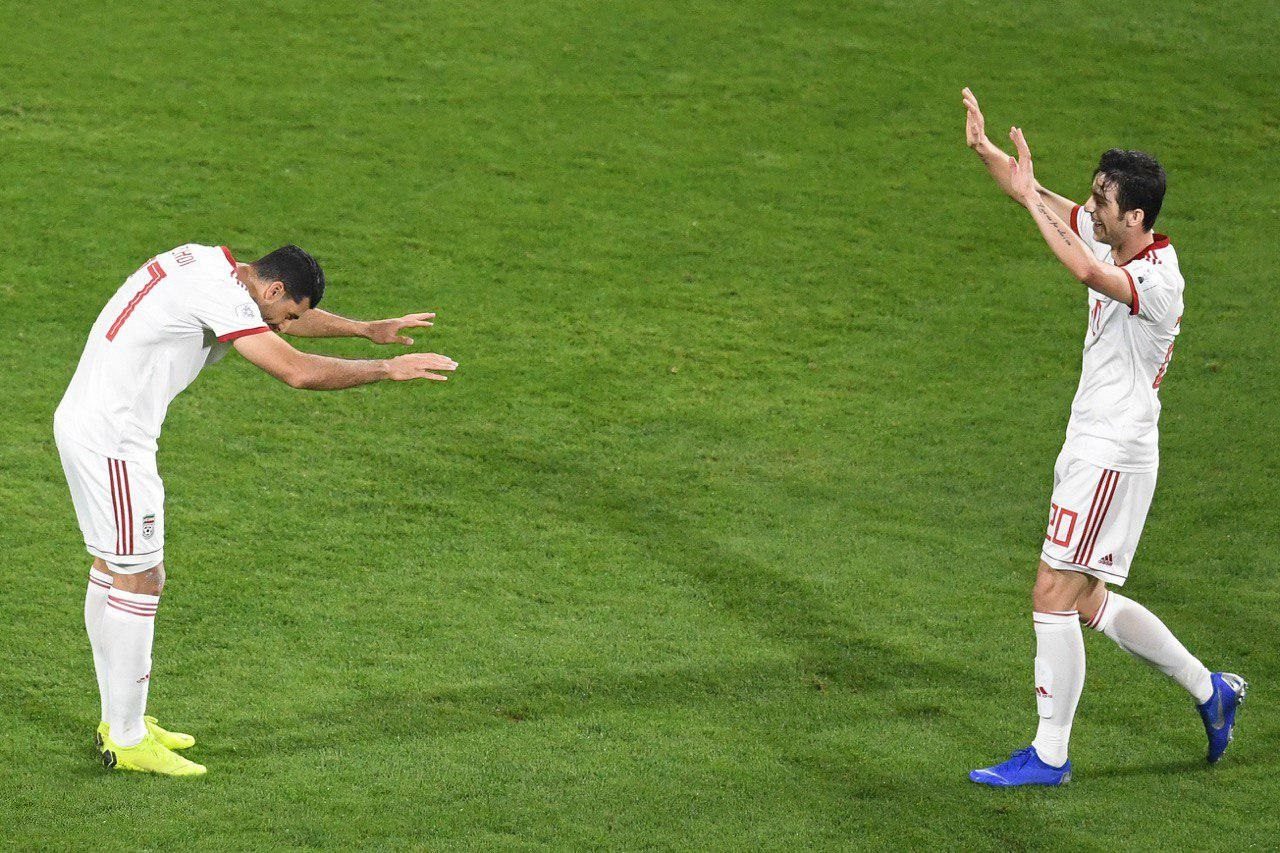
Sardar Azmoun and Mehdi Taremi

In the 18th minute, Sardar Azmoun stole the ball from Feng Xiaoting before squaring it to Mehdi Taremi who fired home to give Iran the lead. The Iranians then spurned a chance to double their advantage when Hossein Kanaanizadegan found Taremi from Ashkan Dejagah’s free kick only to somehow miss the target from only three yards. Azmoun out-muscled Liu Yiming and rounded goalkeeper Yan Junling to score shortly after the half-hour mark. After the break, Taremi and Kanaanizadegan looped headers narrowly over the bar, before Alireza Jahanbakhsh curled an effort narrowly wide of Yan's left-hand upright on 58 minutes. Substitute Yu Dabao missed from close range with 10 minutes remaining, leaving Karim Ansarifard to net another for Iran after yet another defensive error. The victory allowed Iran to play in the semi-finals for the first time since the 2004 edition, coincidentally held in China, where they finished third.

24 January 2019
20:00

China	0–3	Iran
	Report	Taremi 18'; Azmoun 31'; Ansarifard 90+1'

Mohammed bin Zayed Stadium, Abu Dhabi
Attendance: 19,578
Referee: Abdulrahman Al-Jassim (Qatar)

China PR	Iran

GK	1	Yan Junling
CB	6	Feng Xiaoting		(substituted off) 28'
CB	2	Liu Yiming
CB	4	Shi Ke
RWB	17	Zhang Chengdong
LWB	19	Liu Yang
CM	15	Wu Xi		(substituted off) 25'
CM	10	Zheng Zhi (c)
CM	11	Hao Junmin
SS	7	Wu Lei		(substituted off) 75'
CF	18	Gao Lin
Substitutions:
MF	8	Zhao Xuri		(substituted on) 25'
FW	9	Xiao Zhi	(yellow card) 78'	(substituted on) 28'
FW	22	Yu Dabao		(substituted on) 75'
Manager:
(Italy) Marcello Lippi

GK	1	Alireza Beiranvand
RB	23	Ramin Rezaeian
CB	8	Morteza Pouraliganji
CB	13	Hossein Kanaanizadegan
LB	5	Milad Mohammadi
DM	9	Omid Ebrahimi
RM	21	Ashkan Dejagah (c)		(substituted off) 76'
LM	3	Ehsan Hajsafi
AM	18	Alireza Jahanbakhsh		(substituted off) 68'
CF	17	Mehdi Taremi	(yellow card) 67'
CF	20	Sardar Azmoun		(substituted off) 86'
Substitutions:
MF	14	Saman Ghoddos		(substituted on) 68'
MF	4	Rouzbeh Cheshmi		(substituted on) 76'
FW	10	Karim Ansarifard		(substituted on) 86'
Manager:
(Portugal) Carlos Queiroz

Man of the Match:
Sardar Azmoun (Iran)

Assistant referees:
Taleb Al-Marri (Qatar)
Saud Al-Maqaleh (Qatar)
Fourth official:
César Ramos (Mexico)
Video assistant referee:
Danny Makkelie (Netherlands)
Assistant video assistant referees:
Khamis Al-Marri (Qatar)
Ravshan Irmatov (Uzbekistan)

=== South Korea vs Qatar ===
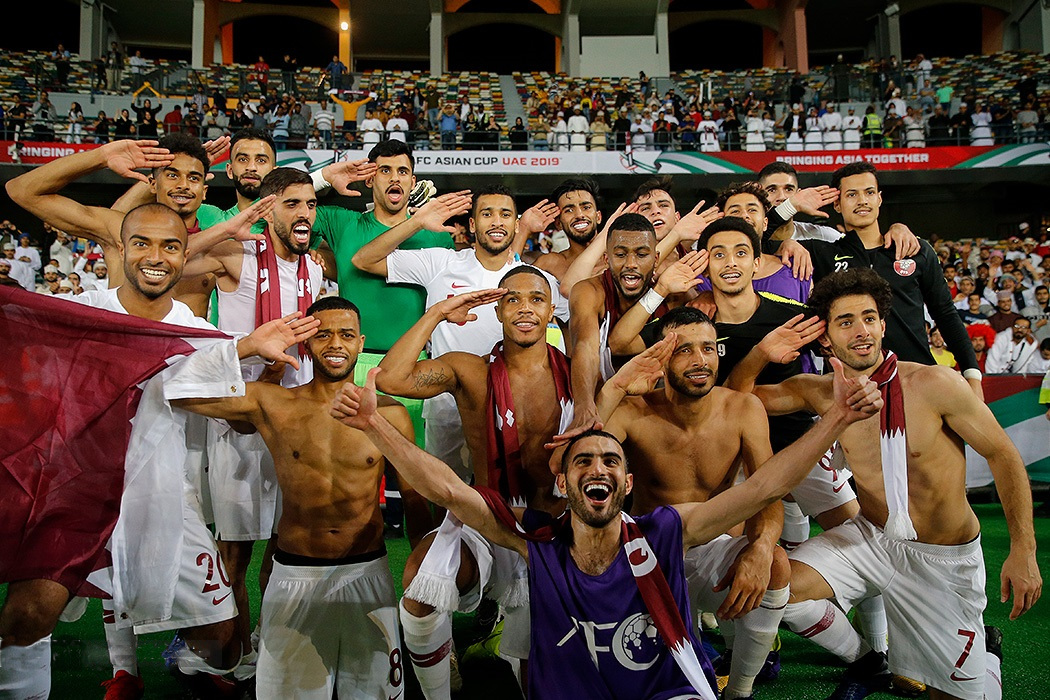
Qatari players celebrating

Akram Afif brought a save out of goalkeeper Kim Seung-gyu shortly after the half-hour mark. Moments later, midfielder Hwang In-beom curled a shot narrowly wide from the edge of the area after Qatar had failed to adequately deal with Lee Yong's free kick. In the second half, Hwang Ui-jo controlled the ball before bringing a fine save out of Qatari custodian Saad Al-Sheeb. Kim Jin-su grazed the outside of an upright with a free kick, before Qatar took the lead minutes later. Gathering possession some 25 yards from goal, Abdulaziz Hatem sent the ball past Seung-gyu's dive and into the bottom corner. Within seconds, Ui-jo had a goal ruled out by the VAR for offside, while Boualem Khoukhi's overhead kick was repelled by Seung-gyu. Late and intense South Korean pressure failed to find the equaliser, leaving Qatar to progress to the next round.

25 January 2019
17:00

South Korea	0–1	Qatar
	Report	Hatem 78'

Zayed Sports City Stadium, Abu Dhabi
Attendance: 13,791
Referee: Ravshan Irmatov (Uzbekistan)

South Korea	Qatar

GK	1	Kim Seung-gyu
RB	2	Lee Yong
CB	4	Kim Min-jae	(yellow card) 9'
CB	19	Kim Young-gwon
LB	3	Kim Jin-su
CM	6	Hwang In-beom		(substituted off) 74'
CM	5	Jung Woo-young	(yellow card) 51'
CM	8	Ju Se-jong		(substituted off) 82'
RF	17	Lee Chung-yong		(substituted off) 84'
CF	18	Hwang Ui-jo
LF	7	Son Heung-min (c)
Substitutions:
MF	13	Koo Ja-cheol		(substituted on) 74'
FW	9	Ji Dong-won		(substituted on) 82'
MF	12	Lee Seung-woo		(substituted on) 84'
Manager:
(Portugal) Paulo Bento

GK	1	Saad Al-Sheeb
RB	2	Ró-Ró
CB	15	Bassam Al-Rawi	(yellow card) 40'
CB	4	Tarek Salman
LB	14	Salem Al-Hajri
CM	16	Boualem Khoukhi
CM	18	Abdulkarim Al-Ali
RW	10	Hassan Al-Haydos (c)		(substituted off) 90'
AM	6	Abdulaziz Hatem	(yellow card) 37'
LW	11	Akram Afif
CF	19	Almoez Ali		(substituted off) 90+5'
Substitutions:
MF	12	Karim Boudiaf		(substituted on) 90'
FW	7	Ahmed Alaaeldin		(substituted on) 90+5'
Manager:
(Spain) Félix Sánchez

Man of the Match:
Abdulaziz Hatem (Qatar)

Assistant referees:
Abdukhamidullo Rasulov (Uzbekistan)
Jakhongir Saidov (Uzbekistan)
Fourth official:
Ma Ning (China PR)
Video assistant referee:
Paolo Valeri (Italy)
Assistant video assistant referees:
Muhammad Taqi (Singapore)
Fu Ming (China PR)

=== United Arab Emirates vs Australia ===
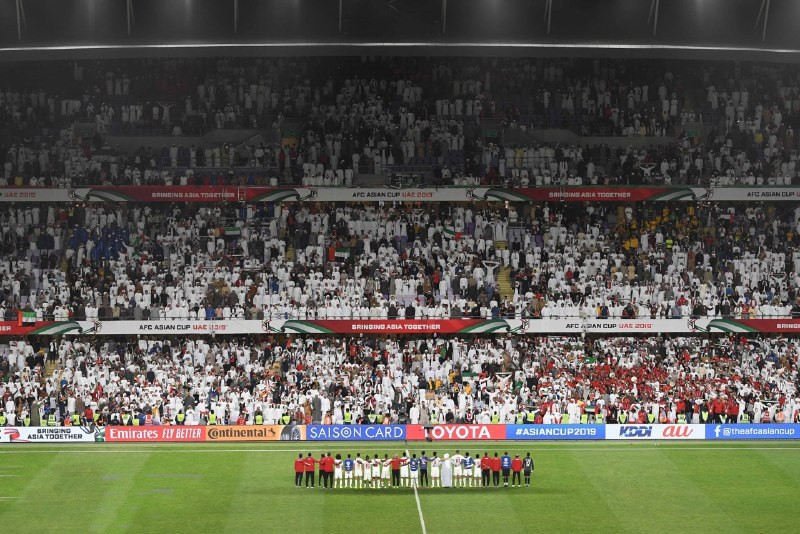
Emirati players and fans after the match

Mathew Ryan denied the hosts at the 20 minute mark when Ismail Al Hammadi stepped inside Trent Sainsbury to fire off an effort that the Socceroos keeper pushed away. With five minutes left in the half, Apostolos Giannou's shot on goal was swatted clear by Khalid Eisa. At the other end, Ali Mabkhout headed over from close range. In the second half, Giannou had the ball in the net following the introduction of Mathew Leckie for Jamie Maclaren, but his effort was ruled out for offside. In the 68th minute, Mabkhout put the UAE ahead with their first opening of the second period, the forward stepped in to intercept Milos Degenek's back-pass before rounding Ryan to score. Australia attempted to claw back an equaliser but the Socceroos came up short to end their reign as Asian champions.

25 January 2019
20:00

United Arab Emirates	1–0	Australia
Mabkhout 68'	Report

Hazza bin Zayed Stadium, Al Ain
Attendance: 25,053
Referee: Ryuji Sato (Japan)

United Arab Emirates	Australia

GK	17	Khalid Eisa
RB	23	Mohamed Ahmed		(substituted off) 18'
CB	6	Fares Juma
CB	19	Ismail Ahmed
LB	3	Walid Abbas	(yellow card) 78'
CM	8	Majed Hassan
CM	2	Ali Salmeen
RW	9	Bandar Al-Ahbabi
AM	10	Ismail Matar (c)		(substituted off) 52'
LW	15	Ismail Al Hammadi	(yellow card) 61'	(substituted off) 88'
CF	7	Ali Mabkhout
Substitutions:
DF	12	Khalifa Al Hammadi		(substituted on) 18'
MF	16	Mohamed Abdulrahman		(substituted on) 52'
FW	20	Saif Rashid		(substituted on) 88'
Manager:
(Italy) Alberto Zaccheroni

GK	1	Mathew Ryan
RB	4	Rhyan Grant
CB	20	Trent Sainsbury
CB	2	Milos Degenek
LB	16	Aziz Behich
RM	10	Robbie Kruse	(yellow card) 44'	(substituted off) 73'
CM	22	Jackson Irvine	(yellow card) 90+7'
CM	5	Mark Milligan (c)
LM	15	Chris Ikonomidis
CF	14	Apostolos Giannou		(substituted off) 80'
CF	9	Jamie Maclaren		(substituted off) 60'
Substitutions:
FW	7	Mathew Leckie		(substituted on) 60'
FW	21	Awer Mabil		(substituted on) 73'
FW	11	Andrew Nabbout		(substituted on) 80'
Manager:
Graham Arnold

Man of the Match:
Ali Mabkhout (United Arab Emirates)

Assistant referees:
Yaser Tulefat (Bahrain)
Jun Mihara (Japan)
Fourth official:
Turki Al-Khudhayr (Saudi Arabia)
Video assistant referee:
Danny Makkelie (Netherlands)
Assistant video assistant referees:
Nawaf Shukralla (Bahrain)
César Ramos (Mexico)

== Semi-finals ==
=== Iran vs Japan ===
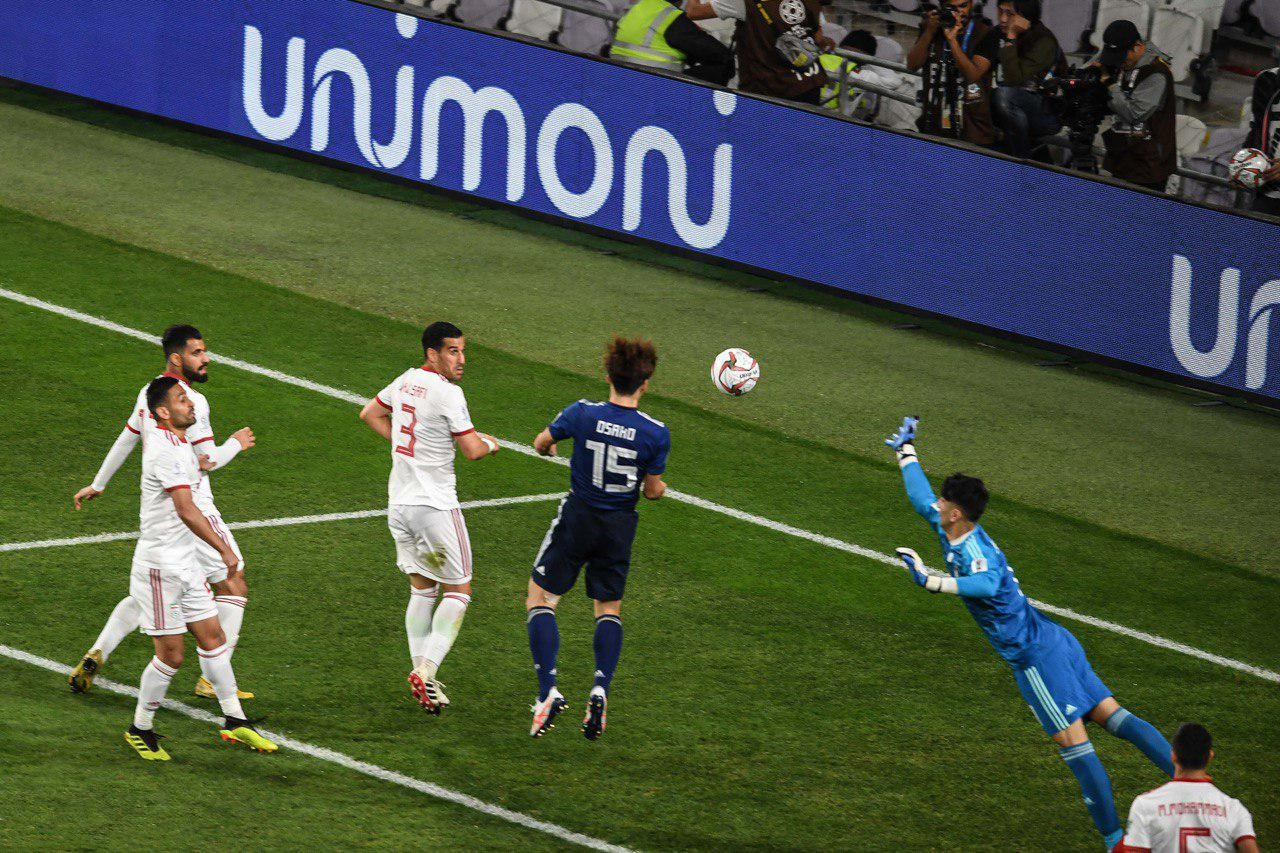
Japan's first goal

Iran and Japan have faced each other in three previous Asian Cup editions, with Japan winning one. The rest were draws. Iran have never scored a goal against Japan in every Asian Cup that the two teams met.

Yuya Osako's ball found space behind Alireza Jahanbakhsh and the advancing Yuto Nagatomo sent in a low cross, but Takumi Minamino missed his chance. Maya Yoshida headed wide from Gaku Shibasaki's corner while Ritsu Dōan also aimed his shot wide. In the opening minutes of the second half, Ashkan Dejagah and Ehsan Hajsafi both saw their attempts miss the target. Moments later, Hossein Kanaanizadegan turned to protest to referee Chris Beath following a collision with Minamino and, while the Australian ignored Iran's pleas, Minamino sent in a cross which was headed home by Osako. Jahanbakhsh almost restored parity five minutes later, only for Shūichi Gonda to tip his free-kick over the bar while Morteza Pouraliganji headed just off target moments later. Minamino's pass into the centre struck the sliding Pouraliganji on the arm. The resulting penalty saw Osako send Alireza Beiranvand the wrong way to double Japan's lead. In added time, Genki Haraguchi added Japan's third goal with a burst through the defence before smashing his shot past Beiranvand to confirm the Samurai Blue's progress to the final.

For Iran, this loss meant that the country's Asian Cup thirst has been extended to 47 years since the last win on home soil back in 1976 and for Japan, since the professionalisation of football in the 1990s, they have made it into the final in five out of eight tournaments, which remains a record.

28 January 2019
18:00

Iran	0–3	Japan
	Report	Osako 56', 67' (pen.); Haraguchi 90+1'

Hazza bin Zayed Stadium, Al Ain
Attendance: 23,262
Referee: Chris Beath (Australia)

Iran	Japan

GK	1	Alireza Beiranvand
RB	23	Ramin Rezaeian
CB	8	Morteza Pouraliganji
CB	13	Hossein Kanaanizadegan
LB	5	Milad Mohammadi
CM	9	Omid Ebrahimi	(yellow card) 44'
CM	3	Ehsan Hajsafi
RW	21	Ashkan Dejagah (c)		(substituted off) 71'
AM	18	Alireza Jahanbakhsh		(substituted off) 71'
LW	11	Vahid Amiri	(yellow card) 24'	(substituted off) 58'
CF	20	Sardar Azmoun	(yellow card) 90+4'
Substitutions:
FW	10	Karim Ansarifard		(substituted on) 58'
MF	14	Saman Ghoddos		(substituted on) 71'
MF	16	Mehdi Torabi		(substituted on) 71'
Manager:
(Portugal) Carlos Queiroz

GK	12	Shūichi Gonda
RB	19	Hiroki Sakai	(yellow card) 46'	(substituted off) 73'
CB	16	Takehiro Tomiyasu
CB	22	Maya Yoshida (c)
LB	5	Yuto Nagatomo	(yellow card) 90+4'
CM	7	Gaku Shibasaki
CM	6	Wataru Endo		(substituted off) 60'
RW	21	Ritsu Dōan		(substituted off) 89'
AM	9	Takumi Minamino
LW	8	Genki Haraguchi
CF	15	Yuya Osako
Substitutions:
DF	18	Tsukasa Shiotani		(substituted on) 60'
DF	3	Sei Muroya		(substituted on) 73'
FW	14	Junya Itō		(substituted on) 89'
Manager:
Hajime Moriyasu

Man of the Match:
Yuya Osako (Japan)

Assistant referees:
Matthew Cream (Australia)
Anton Shchetinin (Australia)
Fourth official:
Kim Dong-jin (South Korea)
Video assistant referee:
Paolo Valeri (Italy)
Assistant video assistant referees:
Muhammad Taqi (Singapore)
Ko Hyung-jin (South Korea)

=== Qatar vs United Arab Emirates ===
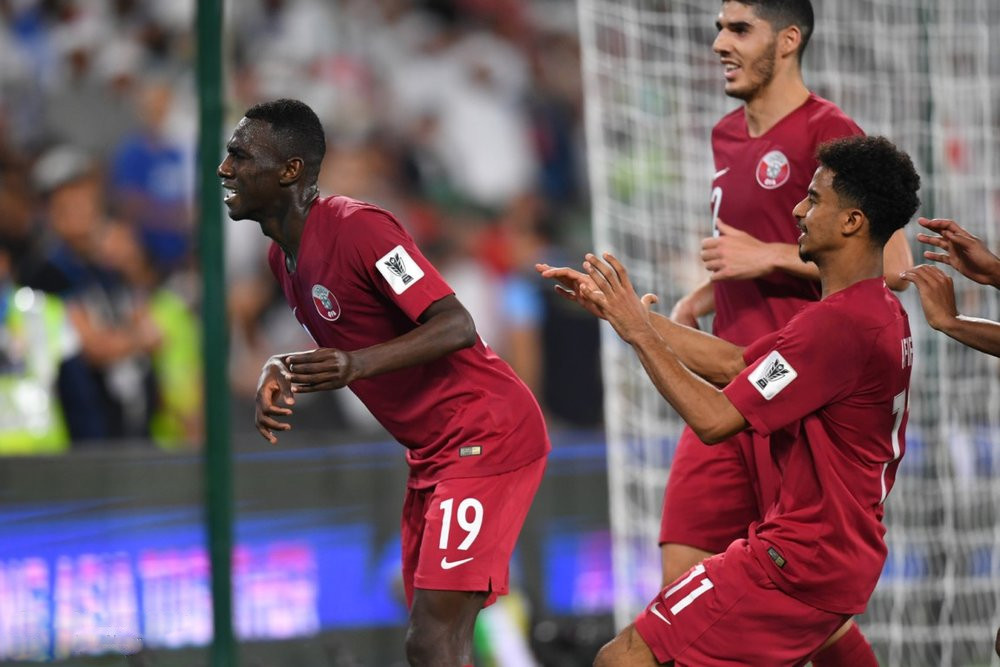
Almoez Ali celebrating after scoring Qatar's second goal

Qatar took the lead at the 22nd minute, Boualem Khoukhi's angled drive from 18 yards found its way under Khalid Eisa's dive and into the net. The UAE responded through an Ismail Al Hammadi header which was saved by Saad Al-Sheeb and a similar effort from Ali Mabkhout that fizzed wide of the target shortly before the half-hour mark. Qatar doubled their lead in the 38th minute. Akram Afif found Almoez Ali who advanced into the area before firing home via a post to equal Ali Daei's record for the most goals by a single player at Asia's premier men's football event. Shortly after, Al Sheeb was on hand to deny Ahmed Khalil. Qatar added a third in the 81st minute when captain Hassan Al-Haydos manoeuvred past Bandar Al-Ahbabi and clipped the ball over Eisa. After the UAE's Ismail Ahmed was shown a straight red card late on for dangerous play, substitute Hamid Ismail rounded off the scoring to confirm Qatar's place in the final.

The match was marred by bottle- and footwear-throwing incidents committed by the UAE supporters. This conduct was preceded by booing the Qatari national anthem. The two countries have had a hostile relationship and had cut ties due to the then-ongoing diplomatic crisis.

29 January 2019
18:00

Qatar	4–0	United Arab Emirates
Khoukhi 22'; Ali 37'; Al-Haydos 80'; Ismail 90+3'	Report

Mohammed bin Zayed Stadium, Abu Dhabi
Attendance: 38,646
Referee: César Ramos (Mexico)

Qatar	United Arab Emirates

GK	1	Saad Al-Sheeb
CB	23	Assim Madibo
CB	16	Boualem Khoukhi
CB	4	Tarek Salman
RWB	2	Ró-Ró		(substituted off) 90+4'
LWB	3	Abdelkarim Hassan
CM	10	Hassan Al-Haydos (c)
CM	14	Salem Al-Hajri
CM	12	Karim Boudiaf	(yellow card) 62'
CF	11	Akram Afif		(substituted off) 90+2'
CF	19	Almoez Ali		(substituted off) 86'
Substitutions:
FW	7	Ahmed Alaaeldin	(yellow card) 87'	(substituted on) 86'
DF	8	Hamid Ismail		(substituted on) 90+2'
DF	13	Tameem Al-Muhaza		(substituted on) 90+4'
Manager:
(Spain) Félix Sánchez

GK	17	Khalid Eisa
CB	19	Ismail Ahmed	(red card) 90+1'
CB	6	Fares Juma (c)
CB	3	Walid Abbas
RM	9	Bandar Al-Ahbabi
CM	13	Khamis Esmaeel
CM	2	Ali Salmeen
CM	5	Amer Abdulrahman		(substituted off) 46'
LM	15	Ismail Al Hammadi		(substituted off) 51'
SS	20	Saif Rashid		(substituted off) 70'
CF	7	Ali Mabkhout
Substitutions:
FW	10	Ismail Matar	(yellow card) 55'	(substituted on) 46'
FW	11	Ahmed Khalil		(substituted on) 51'
MF	16	Mohamed Abdulrahman		(substituted on) 70'
Manager:
(Italy) Alberto Zaccheroni

Man of the Match:
Boualem Khoukhi (Qatar)

Assistant referees:
Miguel Hernández (Mexico)
Alberto Morín (Mexico)
Fourth official:
Ravshan Irmatov (Uzbekistan)
Video assistant referee:
Paolo Valeri (Italy)
Assistant video assistant referees:
Muhammad Taqi (Singapore)
Chris Beath (Australia)

== Final ==
Japan began the match with two set piece chances, but neither was able to provide a scoring chance. Qatar's Almoez Ali opened the scoring in the 12th minute with a bicycle kick from 15 yards (14 m) after juggling a ball received from Akram Afif. With his ninth goal of the tournament, Ali took the record for most goals scored during an Asian Cup that was previously held by Iranian Ali Daei. Abdulaziz Hatem scored Qatar's next goal in the 27th minute, shooting from 25 yards (75 ft) past Japanese goalkeeper Shūichi Gonda towards the top corner.

Japan regained possession and found several scoring chances before and after halftime, including a missed header from Yoshinori Muto and several corner kicks, but were unable to produce a shot on goal. Qatar received an early chance to score their third goal in the 56th minute on a counterattack, but the shot by Hatem went over the crossbar. The lead was cut to 2–1 with a 69th-minute goal from close range by Takumi Minamino—the first to be conceded by Qatar during the tournament. Qatar were awarded a penalty kick in the 82nd minute by the video assistant referee for a handball by Japanese captain Maya Yoshida, who blocked a shot from a corner kick. The penalty was converted by Akram Afif to give Qatar a 3–1 lead that they kept until the end of the match.

1 February 2019
18:00

Japan	1–3	Qatar
Minamino 69'	Report	Ali 12'; Hatem 27'; Afif 83' (pen.)

Zayed Sports City Stadium, Abu Dhabi
Attendance: 36,776
Referee: Ravshan Irmatov (Uzbekistan)

Japan	Qatar

GK	12	Shūichi Gonda
RB	19	Hiroki Sakai	(yellow card) 86'
CB	16	Takehiro Tomiyasu
CB	22	Maya Yoshida (c)	(yellow card) 82'
LB	5	Yuto Nagatomo
CM	7	Gaku Shibasaki	(yellow card) 20'
CM	18	Tsukasa Shiotani		(substituted off) 84'
RW	21	Ritsu Dōan
AM	9	Takumi Minamino		(substituted off) 89'
LW	8	Genki Haraguchi		(substituted off) 62'
CF	15	Yuya Osako
Substitutions:
FW	13	Yoshinori Muto		(substituted on) 62'
FW	14	Junya Itō		(substituted on) 84'
FW	10	Takashi Inui		(substituted on) 89'
Manager:
Hajime Moriyasu

GK	1	Saad Al-Sheeb
CB	15	Bassam Al-Rawi
CB	16	Boualem Khoukhi		(substituted off) 61'
CB	4	Tarek Salman
RM	2	Pedro Miguel	(yellow card) 90+3'
CM	23	Assim Madibo
CM	6	Abdulaziz Hatem
LM	3	Abdelkarim Hassan
RF	10	Hassan Al-Haydos (c)		(substituted off) 74'
CF	19	Almoez Ali		(substituted off) 90+6'
LF	11	Akram Afif	(yellow card) 84'
Substitutions:
MF	14	Salem Al-Hajri		(substituted on) 61'
MF	12	Karim Boudiaf		(substituted on) 74'
FW	7	Ahmed Alaaeldin		(substituted on) 90+6'
Manager:
(Spain) Félix Sánchez

Man of the Match:
Akram Afif (Qatar)

Assistant referees:
Abdukhamidullo Rasulov (Uzbekistan)
Jakhongir Saidov (Uzbekistan)
Fourth official:
Ma Ning (China PR)
Reserve assistant referee:
Huo Weiming (China PR)
Video assistant referee:
Paolo Valeri (Italy)
Assistant video assistant referees:
Muhammad Taqi (Singapore)
Chris Beath (Australia)
