= Turkmenistan at the AFC Asian Cup =

National football delegation

Ever since the collapse of Soviet Union, Turkmenistan has qualified for two Asian Cups, in 2004 and 2019.

Turkmenistan reached the 2004 Asian Cup by finishing top of their qualifying group, ahead of the United Arab Emirates, a nation Turkmenistan defeated in the first game during qualifying. When they reached the 2004 edition, Turkmenistan could only manage one point, albeit against Saudi Arabia, who had reached the Asian Cup final in their previous five tournaments.

As Turkmenistan is still an emerging nation, qualifying for the AFC Asian Cup is their greatest achievement in history, especially since Turkmenistan had chances to reach the Asian Cup in 2011 and 2015 via the AFC Challenge Cup, only for North Korea to defeat Turkmenistan in the final on both instances. That was none more evident when the country qualified for the 2019 edition. Turkmenistan's road began with a shock 1–0 loss to Guam, before an impressive 1–1 draw against Iran in June 2015. Due to the expansion of 24 teams for the 2019 Asian Cup, Turkmenistan got a second chance to play additional qualifiers, with their qualification to the tournament confirmed on 14 November 2017 thanks to a 2–1 victory over Chinese Taipei in Group E. Their last qualifier, a 4–0 loss in Bahrain, meant Turkmenistan qualified for the tournament despite a negative goal difference.

== 2004 China ==
=== Group C ===
Team	Pts	Pld	W	D	L	GF	GA	GD
Uzbekistan	9	3	3	0	0	3	0	+3
Iraq	6	3	2	0	1	5	4	+1
Turkmenistan	1	3	0	1	2	4	6	−2
Saudi Arabia	1	3	0	1	2	3	5	−2

18 July 2004
18:45

Saudi Arabia	2–2	Turkmenistan
Al-Qahtani 9' (pen.), 59'	Report	N. Bayramov 6'; Kuliyev 90+3'

Chengdu Longquanyi Football Stadium, Chengdu
Attendance: 12,400
Referee: Chaiwat Kunsata (Thailand)

22 July 2004
18:30

Turkmenistan	2–3	Iraq
V. Bayramov 14'; Kuliyyew 85'	Report	H. M. Mohammed 12'; Farhan 80'; Munir 88'

Chengdu Longquanyi Football Stadium, Chengdu
Attendance: 22,000
Referee: Saad Kamil Al-Fadhli (Kuwait)

26 July 2004
19:00

Turkmenistan	0–1	Uzbekistan
	Report	Qosimov 58'

Chongqing Olympic Sports Center, Chongqing
Attendance: 34,000
Referee: Mohammed Kousa (Syria)

== 2019 UAE ==
=== Group F ===
Pos	Team	Pld	W	D	L	GF	GA	GD	Pts	Qualification
1	Japan	3	3	0	0	6	3	+3	9	Advance to knockout stage
2	Uzbekistan	3	2	0	1	7	3	+4	6	Advance to knockout stage
3	Oman	3	1	0	2	4	4	0	3	Advance to knockout stage
4	Turkmenistan	3	0	0	3	3	10	−7	0	

Source: AFC
9 January 2019
15:00

Japan	3–2	Turkmenistan
Osako 56', 60'; Dōan 71'	Report	Amanow 26'; Ataýew 79' (pen.)

Al Nahyan Stadium, Abu Dhabi
Attendance: 5,725
Referee: Alireza Faghani (Iran)

13 January 2019
20:00

Turkmenistan	0–4	Uzbekistan
	Report	Sidikov 17'; Shomurodov 24', 42'; Masharipov 40'

Rashid Stadium, Dubai
Attendance: 4,354
Referee: Ammar Al-Jeneibi (United Arab Emirates)

17 January 2019
17:30

Oman	3–1	Turkmenistan
Al-Mahaijri 20'; Mu. Al-Ghassani 84'; Al-Musalami 90+3'	Report	Annadurdyýew 41'

Mohammed bin Zayed Stadium, Abu Dhabi
Attendance: 8,338
Referee: Nawaf Shukralla (Bahrain)

== Record ==
AFC Asian Cup
Year	Result	Position	GP	W	D*	L	GS	GA
(Hong Kong) 1956 to (Qatar) 1988	Part of Soviet Union							
(Japan) 1992	Did not enter							
(United Arab Emirates) 1996	Did not qualify							
(Lebanon) 2000	Did not qualify							
(China) 2004	Group Stage	12th	3	0	1	2	4	6
(Indonesia) (Malaysia) (Thailand) (Vietnam) 2007	Did not qualify							
(Qatar) 2011	Did not qualify							
(Australia) 2015	Did not qualify							
(United Arab Emirates) 2019	Group Stage	21st	3	0	0	3	3	10
(Qatar) 2023	To be determined							
Total	Best: Group Stage	2/8	3	0	1	5	7	16
