= 2019 AFC Asian Cup Group F =

Football tournament group stage

Group F of the 2019 AFC Asian Cup took place from 9 to 17 January 2019. The group consisted of Japan, Uzbekistan, Oman and Turkmenistan. The top two teams, Japan and Uzbekistan, along with third-placed Oman (as one of the four best third-placed teams), advanced to the round of 16.

Japan was the only former champions and are also the team which won the most titles in the Asian Cup (1992, 2000, 2004 and 2011).

== Teams ==
Draw position	Team	Zone	Method of qualification	Date of qualification	Finals appearance	Last appearance	Previous best performance	FIFA Rankings	
Draw position	Team	Zone	Method of qualification	Date of qualification	Finals appearance	Last appearance	Previous best performance	April 2018 (Note: The rankings of April 2018 were used for seeding for the final draw.)	December 2018
F1	Japan	EAFF	Second round group E winners	24 March 2016	9th	2015 (quarter-finals)	Winners (1992, 2000, 2004, 2011)	60	50
F2	Uzbekistan	CAFA	Second round group H winners	29 March 2016	7th	2015 (quarter-finals)	Fourth place (2011)	88	95
F3	Oman	WAFF	Third Round Group D winners	10 October 2017	4th	2015 (group stage)	Group stage (2004, 2007, 2015)	87	82
F4	Turkmenistan	CAFA	Third Round Group E runners-up	14 November 2017	2nd	2004 (group stage)	Group stage (2004)	129	127

== Standings ==
Pos	Team	Pld	W	D	L	GF	GA	GD	Pts	Qualification
1	Japan	3	3	0	0	6	3	+3	9	Advance to knockout stage
2	Uzbekistan	3	2	0	1	7	3	+4	6	Advance to knockout stage
3	Oman	3	1	0	2	4	4	0	3	Advance to knockout stage
4	Turkmenistan	3	0	0	3	3	10	−7	0	

Source: AFC
Rules for classification: Group stage tiebreakers

In the round of 16:

- The winners of Group F, Japan, advanced to play the runners-up of Group E, Saudi Arabia.
- The runners-up of Group F, Uzbekistan, advanced to play the runners-up of Group B, Australia.
- The third-placed team of Group F, Oman, advanced to play the winners of Group D, Iran (as one of the four best third-placed teams).

== Matches ==
All times listed are GST (UTC+4).

=== Japan vs Turkmenistan ===
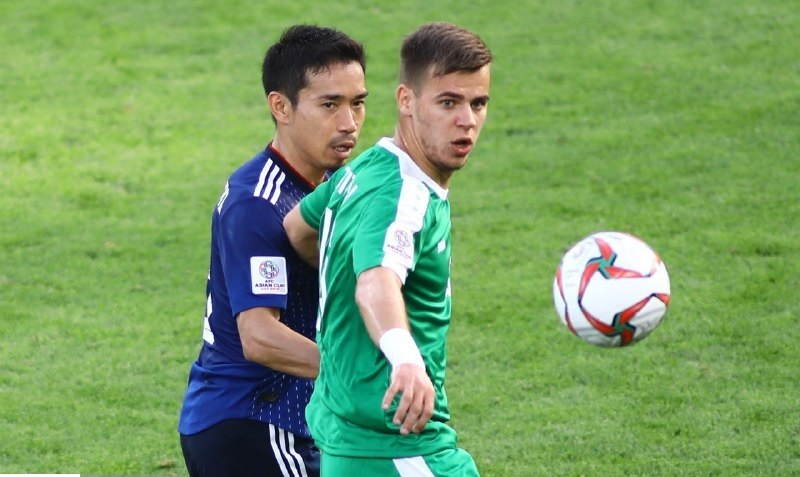
Japan's Yuto Nagatomo and Turkmenistan's Mihail Titow clash during the match

In the 12th minute, Japan had the first chance of the game, with Ritsu Dōan failing to beat Mammet Orazmuhammedow with a close-range header following a Takehiro Tomiyasu pass. Wahyt Orazsähedow forced Shūichi Gonda into a fine save and Mekan Saparow headed over from the resulting corner. Turkmenistan continued to press and took the lead on 27 minutes when captain Arslanmyrat Amanow unleashed a long-range effort into the net. Then, Yuya Osako's effort came narrowly wide, before Orazmuhammedow denied Tomiyasu with a fingertip save. As half-time approached, Turkmenistan came close to doubling their advantage. This time, Ahmet Ataýew stung Gonda's palms with an angled drive. After that, a header from Genki Haraguchi sailed inches wide off the target. In the 56th minute, Osako turned in the area and fired home to equalise the scoreline. Four minutes later Japan took the lead when Saparow's blunder allowed Yuto Nagatomo to find Osako, who scored to bag his second goal of the match. Shortly after, Takumi Minamino found Dōan, who spun away from his marker and fired into the bottom corner beyond Orazmuhammedow's dive. On 79 minutes, Ataýew converted from the spot after Gonda had up-ended substitute Altymyrat Annadurdyýew in the area. Japan held the scoreline to win the match.

9 January 2019
15:00

Japan	3–2	Turkmenistan
Osako 56', 60'; Dōan 71'	Report	Amanow 26'; Ataýew 79' (pen.)

Al Nahyan Stadium, Abu Dhabi
Attendance: 5,725
Referee: Alireza Faghani (Iran)

Japan	Turkmenistan

GK	12	Shūichi Gonda	(yellow card) 78'
RB	19	Hiroki Sakai	(yellow card) 33'
CB	22	Maya Yoshida (c)
CB	20	Tomoaki Makino
LB	5	Yuto Nagatomo
CM	7	Gaku Shibasaki
CM	16	Takehiro Tomiyasu
RW	21	Ritsu Dōan
AM	9	Takumi Minamino		(substituted off) 73'
LW	8	Genki Haraguchi
CF	15	Yuya Osako
Substitutions:
FW	11	Koya Kitagawa		(substituted on) 73'
Manager:
Hajime Moriyasu

GK	1	Mammet Orazmuhammedow
RB	12	Serdar Annaorazow
CB	4	Mekan Saparow
CB	2	Zafar Babajanow
LB	6	Gurbangeldi Batyrow
CM	19	Ahmet Ataýew
CM	21	Resul Hojaýew
RW	7	Arslanmyrat Amanow (c)		(substituted off) 69'
AM	5	Wezirgeldi Ylýasow	(yellow card) 90'
LW	8	Ruslan Mingazow		(substituted off) 85'
CF	9	Wahyt Orazsähedow		(substituted off) 59'
Substitutions:
FW	17	Altymyrat Annadurdyýew		(substituted on) 59'
FW	11	Myrat Ýagşyýew		(substituted on) 69'
FW	15	Mihail Titow		(substituted on) 85'
Manager:
Ýazguly Hojageldyýew

Man of the Match:
Yuya Osako (Japan)

Assistant referees:
Reza Sokhandan (Iran)
Mohammadreza Mansouri (Iran)
Fourth official:
Mohamad Zainal Abidin (Malaysia)
Additional assistant referees:
Muhammad Taqi (Singapore)
Mohd Amirul Izwan Yaacob (Malaysia)

=== Uzbekistan vs Oman ===
In the 14th minute, Oman came close to scoring through Ahmed Kano’s header which was saved by Uzbek goalkeeper Ignatiy Nesterov. In the 25th minute, Saad Al-Mukhaini’s delivery from the right flank sailed for Raed Ibrahim Saleh but the forward failed to connect. Uzbekistan found the back of the net through Odil Ahmedov’s free kick from 25 yards out, the Uzbekistan captain picking up his 18th international goal after he curled his effort past goalkeeper Faiz Al-Rushaidi. Nesterov blocked Mohammed Al-Musalami’s low drive as Uzbekistan took a 1–0 lead into the break. Oman came close to scoring when Ali Al-Busaidi sent a cross which found Al-Mukhaini who wasted the opportunity. Two minutes later, the defender was in goal-scoring range but saw his effort blocked. Oman finally beat Nesterov in the 72nd minute after substitute Muhsen Al-Ghassani, beat the offside trap to score past the Uzbekistan shot stopper. Five minutes from time, Eldor Shomurodov burst into the box and tried a left-footed shot that Al-Rushaidi got a hand to but failed to keep out as he was beaten at his near post. Uzbekistan, however, suffered a blow when Egor Krimets was sent off deep in stoppage time.

9 January 2019
17:30

Uzbekistan	2–1	Oman
Ahmedov 34'; Shomurodov 85'	Report	Mu. Al-Ghassani 72'

Sharjah Stadium, Sharjah
Attendance: 9,424
Referee: Ko Hyung-jin (South Korea)

Uzbekistan	Oman

GK	1	Ignatiy Nesterov	(yellow card) 58'
RB	2	Akmal Shorakhmedov
CB	15	Egor Krimets	(red card) 90+2'
CB	5	Anzur Ismailov
LB	13	Oleg Zoteev
CM	7	Sardor Rashidov		(substituted off) 59'
CM	9	Odil Ahmedov (c)
RW	19	Otabek Shukurov
AM	22	Javokhir Sidikov
LW	11	Jaloliddin Masharipov	(yellow card) 29'	(substituted off) 79'
CF	10	Marat Bikmaev		(substituted off) 83'
Substitutions:
MF	17	Dostonbek Khamdamov		(substituted on) 59'
MF	8	Ikromjon Alibaev		(substituted on) 79'
FW	14	Eldor Shomurodov		(substituted on) 83'
Manager:
(Argentina) Héctor Cúper

GK	18	Faiz Al-Rushaidi
RB	11	Saad Al-Mukhaini
CB	13	Khalid Al-Braiki
CB	2	Mohammed Al-Musalami
LB	17	Ali Al-Busaidi
CM	23	Harib Al-Saadi
CM	12	Ahmed Kano (c)
CM	10	Mohsin Al-Khaldi	(substituted off) 90+1'
RF	15	Jameel Al-Yahmadi	(substituted off) 86'
CF	7	Khalid Al-Hajri	(substituted off) 67'
LF	6	Raed Ibrahim Saleh
Substitutions:
FW	16	Muhsen Al-Ghassani	(substituted on) 67'
MF	20	Salaah Al-Yahyaei	(substituted on) 86'
FW	9	Mohammed Al-Ghassani	(substituted on) 90+1'
Manager:
(Netherlands) Pim Verbeek

Man of the Match:
Otabek Shukurov (Uzbekistan)

Assistant referees:
Yoon Kwang-yeol (South Korea)
Park Sang-jun (South Korea)
Fourth official:
Mohd Yusri Muhamad (Malaysia)
Additional assistant referees:
Kim Dong-jin (South Korea)
Hettikamkanamge Perera (Sri Lanka)

=== Oman vs Japan ===
Genki Haraguchi diverted Ritsu Dōan’s cross onto the bar from six yards inside the first two minutes. On 20 minutes, Salaah Al-Yahyaei found Muhsen Al-Ghassani, who rounded Shūichi Gonda but was unable to finish from a tight angle. Japan broke the deadlock in the 28th minute, Haraguchi picked himself up after being up-ended in the area by Raed Ibrahim Saleh to ram home the resulting spot-kick beyond Faiz Al-Rushaidi’s dive. With half-time approaching, Al-Yahyaei’s drive was diverted to safety by Yuto Nagatomo as Japan maintained their slender lead going into the break. In the second ha;f, Saad Al-Mukhaini’s effort at 70 minutes was gathered by Gonda. An acrobatic Saleh attempt from an Al-Mukhaini cross 10 minutes later and Al-Rushaidi’s last gasp save from substitute Junya Itō proved to be the final goalmouth action of the day.

13 January 2019
17:30

Oman	0–1	Japan
	Report	Haraguchi 28' (pen.)

Zayed Sports City Stadium, Abu Dhabi
Attendance: 12,110
Referee: Mohd Amirul Izwan Yaacob (Malaysia)

Oman	Japan

GK	18	Faiz Al-Rushaidi
RB	11	Saad Al-Mukhaini	(yellow card) 90+2'
CB	13	Khalid Al-Braiki
CB	2	Mohammed Al-Musalami
LB	17	Ali Al-Busaidi
CM	23	Harib Al-Saadi
CM	12	Ahmed Kano (c)	(yellow card) 26'
RW	15	Jameel Al-Yahmadi
AM	20	Salaah Al-Yahyaei		(substituted off) 67'
LW	6	Raed Ibrahim Saleh	(yellow card) 49'
CF	16	Muhsen Al-Ghassani		(substituted off) 77'
Substitutions:
FW	9	Mohammed Al-Ghassani		(substituted on) 67'
FW	7	Khalid Al-Hajri		(substituted on) 77'
Manager:
(Netherlands) Pim Verbeek

GK	12	Shūichi Gonda
RB	19	Hiroki Sakai
CB	22	Maya Yoshida (c)
CB	16	Takehiro Tomiyasu
LB	5	Yuto Nagatomo
CM	6	Wataru Endo
CM	7	Gaku Shibasaki
RW	21	Ritsu Dōan	(yellow card) 36'	(substituted off) 84'
AM	9	Takumi Minamino	(yellow card) 67'
LW	8	Genki Haraguchi
CF	11	Koya Kitagawa		(substituted off) 57'
Substitutions:
FW	13	Yoshinori Muto		(substituted on) 57'
FW	14	Junya Itō		(substituted on) 84'
Manager:
Hajime Moriyasu

Man of the Match:
Takumi Minamino (Japan)

Assistant referees:
Mohd Yusri Muhamad (Malaysia)
Mohamad Zainal Abidin (Malaysia)
Fourth official:
Anton Shchetinin (Australia)
Additional assistant referees:
Peter Green (Australia)
Ko Hyung-jin (South Korea)

=== Turkmenistan vs Uzbekistan ===
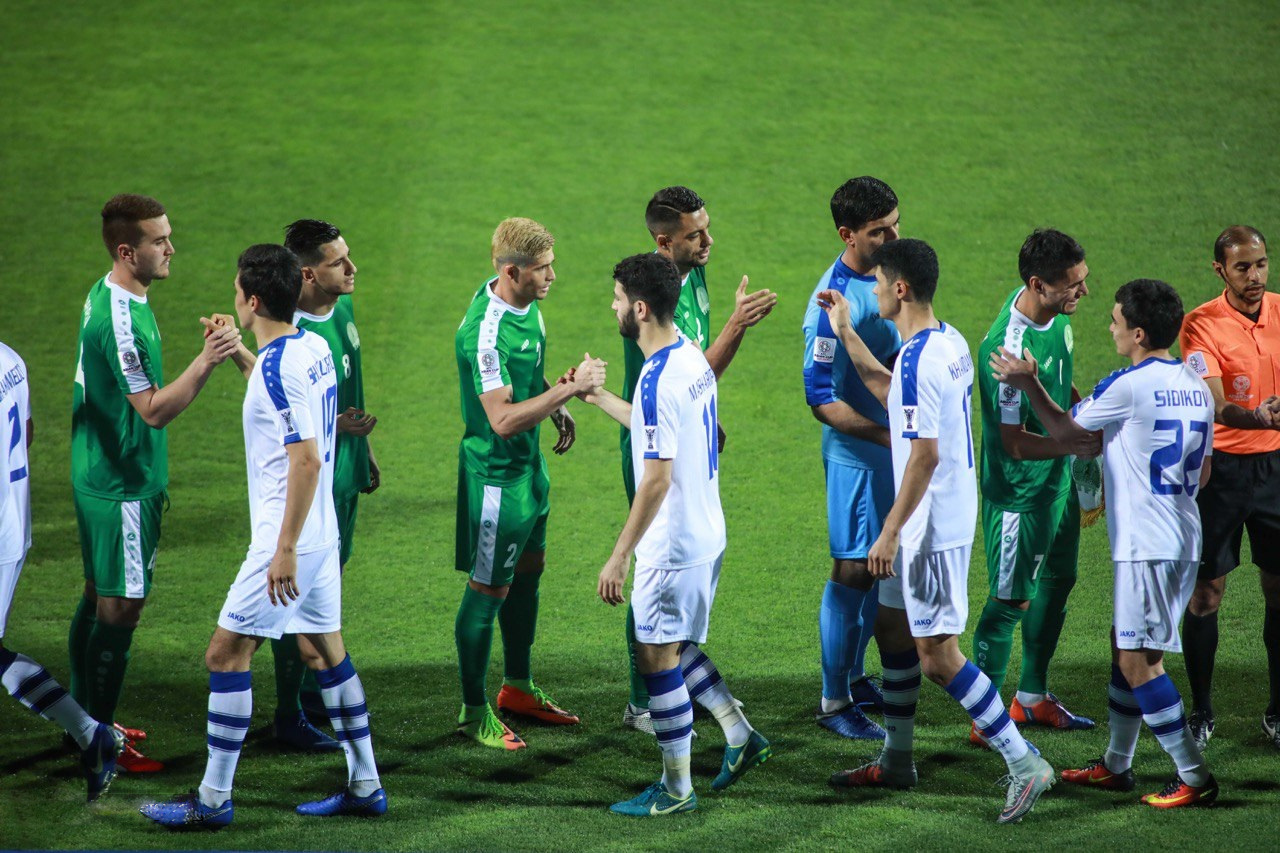
The two teams' players after the match

The two Turkic neighbours have met each other in 2004 edition, where Uzbekistan prevailed with a 1–0 win.

Dostonbek Khamdamov’s header hit the ground before rebounding over the crossbar in the fifth minute. In the 16th minute, a string of passes ended with Javokhir Sidikov sliding the ball into an unguarded goalmouth. Eight minutes later, Otabek Shukurov sent a through pass down the middle to Eldor Shomurodov, whose effort made its way past goalkeeper Mammet Orazmuhammedow. Five minute before the break, Gurbangeldi Batyrow’s poor clearance allowed Jaloliddin Masharipov to let fly a half-volley to make it 3–0. Less than two minutes later, Masharipov turned provider with his pass finding Shomurodov, who scored his second of the night. Khamdamov's 44th minute strike was denied by the upright. Orazmuhammedow made a double save in the 55th minute to maintain the scoreline.

13 January 2019
20:00

Turkmenistan	0–4	Uzbekistan
	Report	Sidikov 17'; Shomurodov 24', 42'; Masharipov 40'

Rashid Stadium, Dubai
Attendance: 4,354
Referee: Ammar Al-Jeneibi (United Arab Emirates)

Turkmenistan	Uzbekistan

GK	1	Mammet Orazmuhammedow
RB	12	Serdar Annaorazow
CB	4	Mekan Saparow
CB	2	Zafar Babajanow
LB	6	Gurbangeldi Batyrow
CM	19	Ahmet Ataýew	(substituted off) 44'
CM	21	Resul Hojaýew
RW	7	Arslanmyrat Amanow (c)	(substituted off) 65'
AM	5	Wezirgeldi Ylýasow
LW	8	Ruslan Mingazow
CF	9	Wahyt Orazsähedow	(substituted off) 46'
Substitutions:
FW	20	Myrat Annaýew	(substituted on) 44'
FW	17	Altymyrat Annadurdyýew	(substituted on) 46'
FW	15	Mihail Titow	(substituted on) 65'
Manager:
Ýazguly Hojageldyýew

GK	1	Ignatiy Nesterov
RB	2	Akmal Shorakhmedov		(substituted off) 46'
CB	20	Islom Tukhtakhodjaev
CB	5	Anzur Ismailov	(yellow card) 71'
LB	13	Oleg Zoteev
CM	9	Odil Ahmedov (c)		(substituted off) 76'
CM	19	Otabek Shukurov
RW	17	Dostonbek Khamdamov
AM	22	Javokhir Sidikov		(substituted off) 68'
LW	11	Jaloliddin Masharipov
CF	14	Eldor Shomurodov
Substitutions:
DF	6	Davron Khashimov		(substituted on) 46'
MF	8	Ikromjon Alibaev		(substituted on) 68'
MF	18	Fozil Musaev		(substituted on) 76'
Manager:
(Argentina) Héctor Cúper

Man of the Match:
Eldor Shomurodov (Uzbekistan)

Assistant referees:
Mohamed Al-Hammadi (United Arab Emirates)
Hasan Al-Mahri (United Arab Emirates)
Fourth official:
Mohammed Al-Abakry (Saudi Arabia)
Additional assistant referees:
Mohammed Abdulla Hassan Mohamed (United Arab Emirates)
Turki Al-Khudhayr (Saudi Arabia)

=== Oman vs Turkmenistan ===
In the sixth minute, Muhsen Al-Ghassani's left-footed shot from the centre of the box was saved by goalkeeper Mammet Orazmuhammedow. In the 20th minute, Ahmed Kano scored a free kick from 25 yards out. In the 31st minute, Myrat Ýagşyýew's header was tipped over by goalkeeper Faiz Al-Rushaidi. Turkmenistan equalised in the 41st minute with Altymyrat Annadurdyýew evading several Oman players before unleashing his shot from the left into the top left corner. Oman came close in the 55th and 56th minutes - through a header by Mohammed Al-Musalami and a shot by Khalid Al-Hajri respectively. Muhsen went for the spectacular in the 68th minute with an overhead kick which Orazmuhammedow saved and the goalkeeper stood tall again just seconds later to deny Kano on the left, with the ball seemingly headed for the top of the net. Orazmuhammedow, however, was finally beaten in the 84th minute with Muhsen sweeping the ball in after the goalkeeper had parried an initial effort. Three minutes into added time, Al-Musalami jumped high to head home Oman's third goal of the day to gain the win, and more importantly, guiding Oman to the round of sixteen for the first time ever in the country's football history, having failed in three previous editions.

17 January 2019
17:30

Oman	3–1	Turkmenistan
Al-Mahaijri 20'; Mu. Al-Ghassani 84'; Al-Musalami 90+3'	Report	Annadurdyýew 41'

Mohammed bin Zayed Stadium, Abu Dhabi
Attendance: 8,338
Referee: Nawaf Shukralla (Bahrain)

Oman	Turkmenistan

GK	18	Faiz Al-Rushaidi
RB	11	Saad Al-Mukhaini
CB	13	Khalid Al-Braiki	(yellow card) 36'	(substituted off) 74'
CB	2	Mohammed Al-Musalami
LB	17	Ali Al-Busaidi
CM	23	Harib Al-Saadi	(yellow card) 22'
CM	12	Ahmed Kano (c)
RW	6	Raed Ibrahim Saleh
AM	7	Khalid Al-Hajri		(substituted off) 86'
LW	4	Mohamed Khasib		(substituted off) 61'
CF	16	Muhsen Al-Ghassani
Substitutions:
FW	15	Jameel Al-Yahmadi		(substituted on) 61'
FW	9	Mohammed Al-Ghassani	(yellow card) 90+1'	(substituted on) 74'
MF	20	Salaah Al-Yahyaei		(substituted on) 86'
Manager:
(Netherlands) Pim Verbeek

GK	1	Mammet Orazmuhammedow (c)
RB	12	Serdar Annaorazow
CB	3	Güýçmyrat Annagulyýew
CB	4	Mekan Saparow	(yellow card) 79'
LB	6	Gurbangeldi Batyrow
CM	18	Serdar Geldiýew	(yellow card) 54'
CM	21	Resul Hojaýew		(substituted off) 46'
RW	8	Ruslan Mingazow		(substituted off) 68'
AM	5	Wezirgeldi Ylýasow
LW	11	Myrat Ýagşyýew
CF	17	Altymyrat Annadurdyýew	(yellow card) 35'	(substituted off) 83'
Substitutions:
MF	19	Ahmet Ataýew	(yellow card) 72'	(substituted on) 46'
FW	7	Arslanmyrat Amanow		(substituted on) 68'
FW	15	Mihail Titow		(substituted on) 83'
Manager:
Ýazguly Hojageldyýew

Man of the Match:
Ahmed Kano (Oman)

Assistant referees:
Yaser Tulefat (Bahrain)
Mohamed Salman (Bahrain)
Fourth official:
Miguel Hernández (Mexico)
Additional assistant referees:
César Ramos (Mexico)
Khamis Al-Kuwari (Qatar)

=== Japan vs Uzbekistan ===
Koya Kitagawa forced Ignatiy Nesterov into action 10 minutes before the break when his shot on the turn was tipped over by the keeper. With five minutes left in the half, Uzbekistan took the lead, Eldor Shomurodov latched on to Dostonbek Khamdamov’s through ball to outpace Tomoaki Makino before stepping inside Genta Miura and clipping the finish into the top corner with the outside of his right boot. The lead, though, was to last only three minutes as Sei Muroya turned on the left touchline before outstripping Farrukh Sayfiev and sending over a cross towards Yoshinori Muto, who rose to power his header home. Nesterov parried Junya Itō’s shot nine minutes after the restart while Muto went close seconds later, shooting just over the bar. Two minutes before the hour mark Tsukasa Shiotani's left-foot strike from distance curled away from Nesterov to put Japan in front. Davron Khashimov forced Daniel Schmidt to tip his long-range drive over the bar in the final minutes as Japan closed out the game to take their third win in a row and advance to the next round with a perfect record.

17 January 2019
17:30

Japan	2–1	Uzbekistan
Muto 43'; Shiotani 58'	Report	Shomurodov 40'

Khalifa bin Zayed Stadium, Al Ain
Attendance: 7,005
Referee: Mohammed Abdulla Hassan Mohamed (United Arab Emirates)

Japan	Uzbekistan

GK	23	Daniel Schmidt
RB	3	Sei Muroya
CB	20	Tomoaki Makino
CB	2	Genta Miura
LB	4	Sho Sasaki
CM	17	Toshihiro Aoyama (c)
CM	18	Tsukasa Shiotani	(yellow card) 48'
RW	14	Junya Itō
AM	11	Koya Kitagawa		(substituted off) 90+3'
LW	10	Takashi Inui		(substituted off) 81'
CF	13	Yoshinori Muto	(yellow card) 33'	(substituted off) 85'
Substitutions:
FW	8	Genki Haraguchi		(substituted on) 81'
MF	6	Wataru Endo		(substituted on) 85'
DF	16	Takehiro Tomiyasu		(substituted on) 90+3'
Manager:
Hajime Moriyasu

GK	1	Ignatiy Nesterov (c)
RB	20	Islom Tukhtakhodjaev
CB	6	Davron Khashimov
CB	4	Farrukh Sayfiev	(yellow card) 69'
LB	15	Egor Krimets	(yellow card) 72'
CM	8	Ikromjon Alibaev
CM	17	Dostonbek Khamdamov		(substituted off) 65'
RW	18	Fozil Musaev		(substituted off) 76'
AM	19	Otabek Shukurov
LW	22	Javokhir Sidikov
CF	14	Eldor Shomurodov		(substituted off) 70'
Substitutions:
MF	16	Azizbek Turgunboev		(substituted on) 65'
FW	10	Marat Bikmaev		(substituted on) 70'
FW	7	Sardor Rashidov		(substituted on) 76'
Manager:
(Argentina) Héctor Cúper

Man of the Match:
Toshihiro Aoyama (Japan)

Assistant referees:
Mohamed Al-Hammadi (United Arab Emirates)
Hasan Al-Mahri (United Arab Emirates)
Fourth official:
Huo Weiming (China PR)
Additional assistant referees:
Ammar Al-Jeneibi (United Arab Emirates)
Ali Sabah (Iraq)

== Discipline ==
Fair play points were used as tiebreakers if the head-to-head and overall records of teams were tied (and if a penalty shoot-out was not applicable as a tiebreaker). These were calculated based on yellow and red cards received in all group matches as follows:

- yellow card = 1 point
- red card as a result of two yellow cards = 3 points
- direct red card = 3 points
- yellow card followed by direct red card = 4 points

Only one of the above deductions was applied to a player in a single match.

Team	Match 1				Match 2				Match 3				Points
Team	Booked	(yellow card) (yellow-red card)	Sent off (straight red)	(yellow card) (red card)	Booked	(yellow card) (yellow-red card)	Sent off (straight red)	(yellow card) (red card)	Booked	(yellow card) (yellow-red card)	Sent off (straight red)	(yellow card) (red card)	Points
Japan	2				2				2				−6
Oman					3				3				−6
Turkmenistan	1								5				−6
Uzbekistan	2		1		1				2				−8
