= Sharjah Stadium (football) =

Sports stadium in the UAE

- استاد الشارقة
- Interactive map of Sharjah Stadium
- Location: Sharjah, United Arab Emirates
- Coordinates: 25°20′00″N 55°25′11″E
- Operator: Sharjah FC
- Capacity: 12,500
- Type: Stadium

Tenant
- Sharjah FC

Website
- www.sharjahfc.gov.ae

Sharjah Stadium (Arabic: استاد الشارقة) is a multi-purpose stadium in Sharjah, United Arab Emirates. It is currently used mostly for football matches and is the home ground of Sharjah FC. The stadium has a capacity of 18,000.

== 2019 AFC Asian Cup ==
Sharjah Stadium hosted six games of the 2019 AFC Asian Cup, including the round of 16 match between Asian powerhouses Japan vs Saudi Arabia.

Date	Time	Team No. 1	Res.	Team No. 2	Round	Attendance
6 January 2019	20:00	Syria	0–0	Palestine	Group B	8,471
9 January 2019	17:30	Uzbekistan	2–1	Oman	Group F	9,424
12 January 2019	17:30	Yemen	0–3	Iraq	Group D	9,757
14 January 2019	20:00	India	0–1	Bahrain	Group A	11,417
17 January 2019	20:00	Lebanon	4–1	North Korea	Group E	4,332
21 January 2019	15:00	Japan	1–0	Saudi Arabia	Round of 16	6,832

== See also ==
- Lists of stadiums
- List of football stadiums in the United Arab Emirates
