= Gurbangeldi Batyrow =

Turkmenistan footballer

Personal information
- Full name: Gurbangeldi Muhammedowiç Batyrow
- Date of birth: July 28, 1988 (age 38)
- Place of birth: Balkanabat, Turkmen SSR, Soviet Union
- Height: 1.70 m (5 ft 7 in)
- Position: Defender

Team information
- Current team: FC Altyn Asyr
- Number: 17

Senior career*
Years	Team	Apps	(Gls)
2011–2012	FC Balkan Balkanabat		
2012–2016	HTTU Aşgabat		
2017–	FC Altyn Asyr		

International career^{‡}
2014–	Turkmenistan	12	(1)
- * Club domestic league appearances and goals ‡ National team caps and goals as of 9 June 2021

Gurbangeldi Muhammedowiç Batyrow (born 28 July 1988) is a Turkmen footballer currently playing for FC Altyn Asyr. He has also been capped by the national team in which he has appeared twice and scored one goal.

== Club career ==
Since 2017 plays for FC Altyn Asyr.

== International career ==
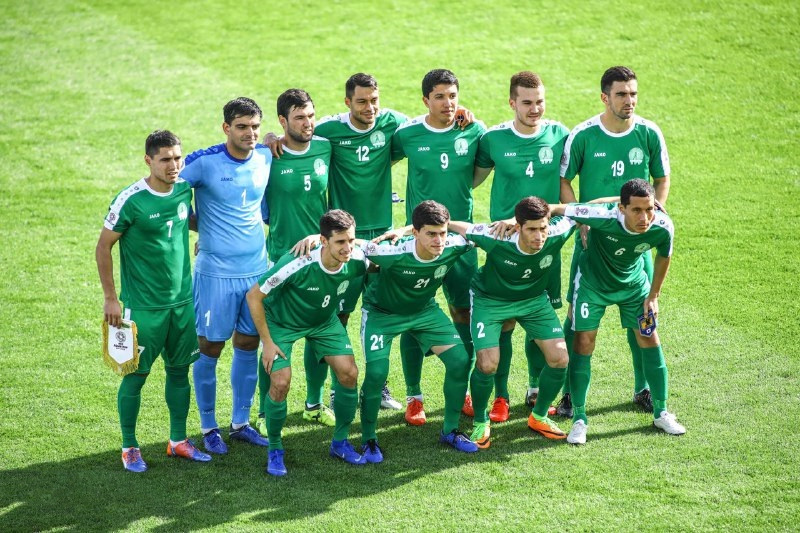
№6 Batyrow at 2019 AFC Asian Cup with Turkmenistan national team

Batyrow has played for Turkmenistan twice playing in the two 2014 AFC Challenge Cup qualification against the Philippines and Cambodia.

== Honors ==
AFC President's Cup:

- Winner: 2014
