= Serdar Annaorazow =

Turkmen footballer

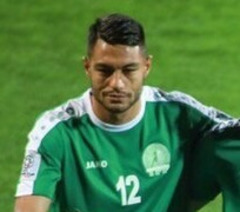

Personal information
- Full name: Serdar Nazarowiç Annaorazow
- Date of birth: 29 June 1990 (age 36)
- Place of birth: Aşgabat, Turkmen SSR, Soviet Union
- Height: 1.85 m (6 ft 1 in)
- Position: Right back

Team information
- Current team: Altyn Asyr FK
- Number: 12

Senior career*
Years	Team	Apps	(Gls)
2011–2014	HTTU Aşgabat		
2014–2020	Altyn Asyr		
2019–2021	FC Ahal		
2021-2022	Nebitçi		
2022–	Altyn Asyr FK	22	(2)

International career^{‡}
2008–2019	Turkmenistan	39	(0)
- * Club domestic league appearances and goals as of 12 February 2023 @ 15:36(AEST) ‡ National team caps and goals as of February 02, 2021

Serdar Annaorazow (born 29 June 1990) is a Turkmen footballer currently playing as a right back for Nebitçi Balkanabat.

He has been capped for the national team 39 times.

== Club career ==
He began his career at HTTU Aşgabat. In 2014, he moved to the FC Altyn Asyr.

In 2014, he won the AFC President's Cup, with the team defeating North Korea's Rimyongsu in the final.

Since January 2015, he has been a player for the Ashgabat-based club Altyn Asyr. In his first year with Altyn Asyr, he became the 2015 champion of Turkmenistan and won both the 2015 Turkmenistan Super Cup and the 2015 Turkmenistan Cup.

In March 2021, Annaorazow signed for club Nebitçi Balkanabat.

== International career ==
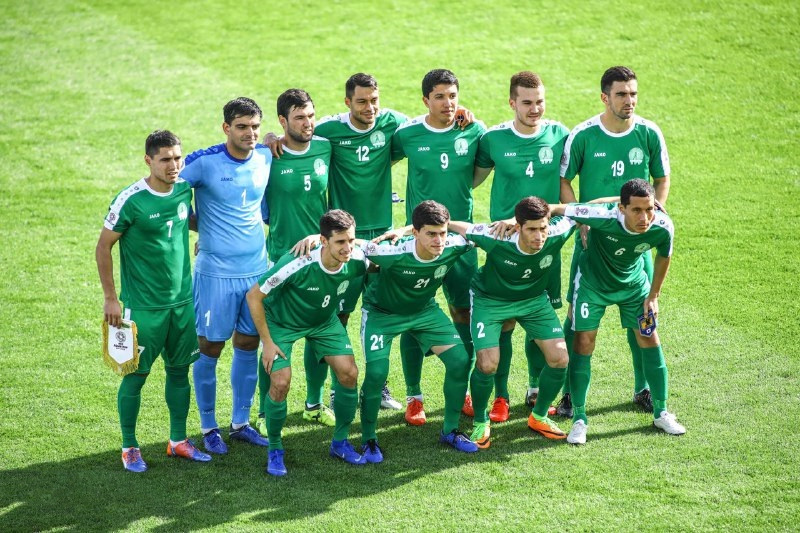
No.12 Annaorazow at 2019 AFC Asian Cup with Turkmenistan natioanal team

He made his debut for the Turkmenistan national team on 28 July 2008, in a qualifying match for the 2010 World Cup against the Indonesia national team, he came on as a substitute in the second half.

In December 2018, he was included in the bid for the 2019 Asian Cup.
