= Wezirgeldi Ylýasow =

Turkmen footballer

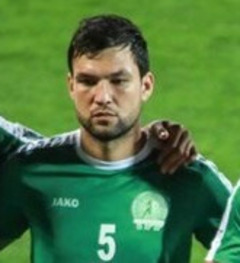

Personal information
- Full name: Wezirgeldi Omarowiç Ylýasow
- Date of birth: 18 January 1992 (age 34)
- Place of birth: Gumdag, Balkan Region, Turkmenistan
- Height: 1.83 m (6 ft 0 in)
- Position: Midfielder

Team information
- Current team: Nebitçi

Senior career*
Years	Team	Apps	(Gls)
2014–2017	Ýedigen		
2018–2019	Ahal		
2020	Qizilqum	7	(0)
2021–2024	Altyn Asyr		
2024–	Nebitçi		

International career^{‡}
2019–	Turkmenistan	13	(0)
- * Club domestic league appearances and goals as of 25 September 2024 ‡ National team caps and goals as of 25 September 2024

Vezirgeldi Omarovich Ylyasov (born 18 January 1992) is a Turkmen professional footballer who plays for Nebitçi and Turkmenistan as midfielder.

== Club career ==
2018–2019 years he has been played for the FC Ahal.

In February 2020, he signed a contract with the Uzbek club FC Qizilqum Zarafshon. On 1 March 2020, Ylyasov made his debut in the Uzbekistan Super League in a 1–3 loss against Nasaf. In August 2020 leaves club.

== International career ==
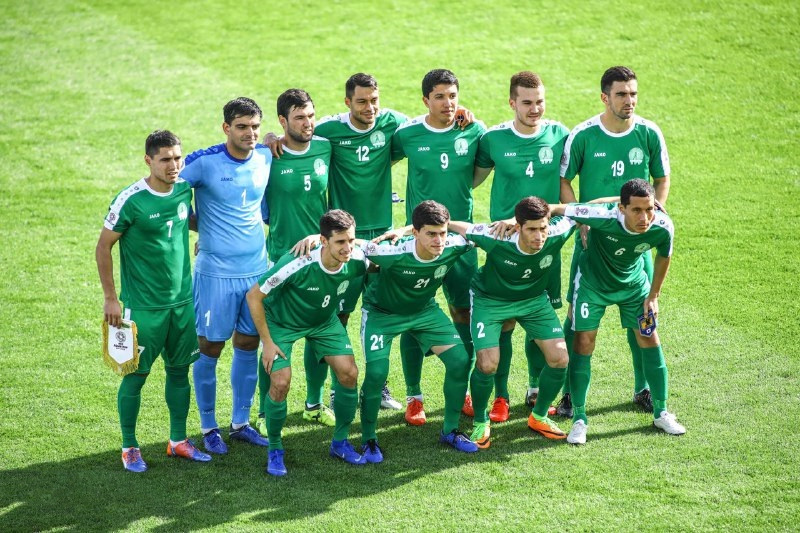
No.5 Ylýasow, lining up with Turkmenistan national team at the 2019 AFC Asian Cup

Ylyasov was included in Turkmenistan's squad for the 2019 AFC Asian Cup in the United Arab Emirates. He made his senior debut against Japan on 9 January 2019 at the group stage.

== Career statistics ==
=== International ===
Statistics accurate as of match played 14 June 2022

Turkmenistan national team
Year	Apps	Goals
2019	10	0
2022	3	0
Total	13	0
