= Mohammed Al-Musalami =

Omani footballer (born 1990)

Personal information
- Date of birth: 27 April 1990 (age 36)
- Place of birth: Sohar, Oman
- Height: 1.75 m (5 ft 9 in)
- Position: Centre-back

Team information
- Current team: Al-Seeb
- Number: 13

Senior career*
Years	Team	Apps	(Gls)
2009–2011	Saham	?	(3)
2011–2012	Al-Shabab	?	(1)
2012–2018	Fanja		
2018	Al Jazira	6	(0)
2018–2021	Dhofar		
2021–2022	Al Gharafa		
2022–	Al-Seeb Club		

International career^{‡}
2010–2011	Oman U23	6	(0)
2011–	Oman	112	(3)
Medal record
Men's football
Representing Oman
Gulf Cup
Runner-up	2024 Kuwait
- * Club domestic league appearances and goals ‡ National team caps and goals as of 19 January 2023

Mohammed Al-Musalami (Arabic: مُحَمَّد صَالِح عَلِيّ الْمُسْلِمِيّ; born 20 April 1990), commonly known as Mohammed Al-Musalami, is an Omani footballer who plays as a centre back for Al-Seeb.

== Club career ==
On 17 July 2013, he agreed a one-year contract extension with 2012–13 Oman Elite League runners-up Fanja SC. On 2 July 2014, he agreed a one-year contract extension with Fanja SC.

In September 2021, he joined Qatar Stars League club Al-Gharafa.

== International career ==
Mohammed is part of the first team squad of the Oman national football team. He was selected for the national team for the first time in 2010. He made his first appearance for Oman on 11 September 2012 in a friendly match against Ireland. He has made appearances in the 2014 FIFA World Cup qualification, the 21st Arabian Gulf Cup, 2015 AFC Asian Cup qualification and the 22nd Arabian Gulf Cup and has represented the national team in the 2011 AFC Asian Cup qualification.

== Career statistics ==
=== International goals ===
Scores and results list Oman's goal tally first.

No.	Date	Venue	Opponent	Score	Result	Competition
1.	7 November 2014	Sultan Qaboos Sports Complex, Muscat, Oman	Yemen	1–0	2–0	Friendly
2.	7 November 2014	Sultan Qaboos Sports Complex, Muscat, Oman	Yemen	2–0	2–0	Friendly
3.	17 January 2019	Mohammed bin Zayed Stadium, Abu Dhabi, United Arab Emirates	Turkmenistan	3–1	3–1	2019 AFC Asian Cup

== Honours ==
=== Club ===
- With Saham

- Sultan Qaboos Cup (1): 2009
- Oman Super Cup (1): 2010

- With Al-Shabab

- Oman Elite League (0): Runner-Up 2011–12

- With Fanja

- Oman Professional League (0): Runner-Up 2012–13, 2013-14
- Sultan Qaboos Cup (1): 2013-14
- Oman Professional League Cup (1): 2014-15
- Oman Super Cup (1): 2012; Runner-Up 2013, 2014
