= Saad Al-Mukhaini =

Omani footballer (born 1987)

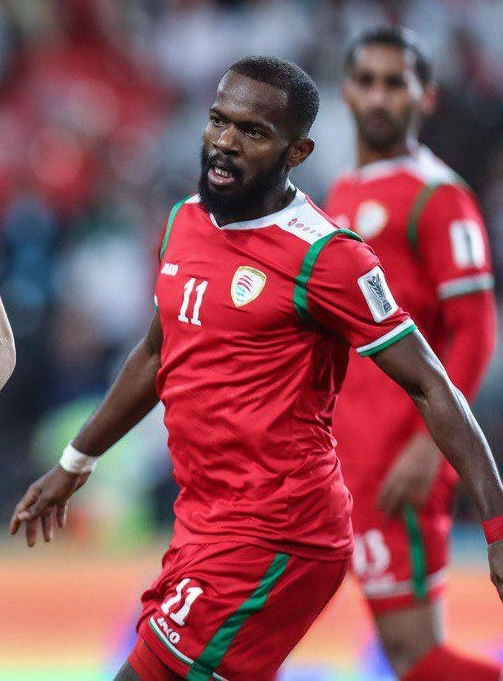
- Al-Mukhaini playing for Oman at 2019 AFC Asian Cup

Personal information
- Full name: Saad Suhail Juma Al-Mukhaini
- Date of birth: 6 September 1987 (age 39)
- Place of birth: Sur, Oman
- Height: 1.70 m (5 ft 7 in)
- Position: Right-back

Team information
- Current team: Sohar

Youth career
- 2002–2006: Al-Oruba

Senior career*
Years	Team	Apps	(Gls)
2006–2010	Al-Oruba	78	(3)
2010–2011	Al-Suwaiq	14	(0)
2011–2012	Fanja	33	(1)
2012–2013	Dhofar	27	(1)
2013–2014	Fanja	20	(2)
2014–2018	Al-Oruba	?	(2)
2018–2019	Al Nassr	7	(0)
2019–2020	Al-Nahda		
2020–	Sohar		

International career^{‡}
2009–2019	Oman	110	(1)
- * Club domestic league appearances and goals ‡ National team caps and goals as of 19:15, 2 December 2019 (UTC)

Saad Suhail Juma Al-Mukhaini (Arabic: سَعْد سُهَيْل جُمْعَة الْمُخَيْنِيّ; born 6 September 1987), also known as Saad Suhail, is an Omani professional footballer who plays for Sohar in the Oman Professional League.

== Club career ==
In 2006, he signed with Al-Oruba. In 2010, he moved to Al-Suwaiq where he played for one season before signing for Fanja. In January 2012, it was confirmed that he was given a trial by Arsenal. In 2012, he signed for Dhofar. In 2013, he came back to Fanja and then to Al-Oruba on 13 July 2014.

=== Club career statistics ===
Club	Season	Division	League		Cup		Continental		Other		Total	
Club	Season	Division	Apps	Goals	Apps	Goals	Apps	Goals	Apps	Goals	Apps	Goals
Al-Oruba	2006–07	Omani League	-	2	-	0	0	0	-	0	-	2
Al-Oruba	2008–09	Omani League	-	1	-	0	0	0	-	0	-	1
Al-Oruba	2009–10	Omani League	-	1	-	1	0	0	-	0	-	2
Al-Oruba	Total		-	4	-	1	0	0	-	0	-	5
Al-Suwaiq	2010–11	Omani League	-	0	-	0	5	0	-	0	-	0
Al-Suwaiq	Total		-	0	-	0	5	0	-	0	-	0
Fanja	2011–12	Oman Elite League	-	1	-	0	0	0	-	0	-	1
Fanja	Total		-	1	-	0	0	0	-	0	-	1
Dhofar	2012–13	Oman Elite League	-	1	-	0	3	0	-	0	-	1
Dhofar	Total		-	1	-	0	3	0	-	0	-	1
Fanja	2013–14	Oman Professional League	-	2	-	0	5	0	-	0	-	2
Fanja	Total		-	2	-	0	5	0	-	0	-	2
Al-Oruba	2014–15	Oman Professional League	-	2	-	1	0	0	-	0	-	3
Al-Oruba	Total		-	2	-	1	0	0	-	0	-	3
Career total			-	10	-	2	13	0	-	0	-	12

== International career ==
Saad is part of the first team squad of the Oman national football team. He was selected for the national team for the first time in 2009. He made his first appearance for Oman on 9 June 2009 in a friendly match against Bosnia and Herzegovina. He has made appearances in the 19th Arabian Gulf Cup, the 20th Arabian Gulf Cup, the 2011 AFC Asian Cup qualification, the 2014 FIFA World Cup qualification, the 21st Arabian Gulf Cup and the 2015 AFC Asian Cup qualification.

== National team career statistics ==
=== International caps ===
As of 2 December 2019

Oman national team
Year	Apps	Goals
2006	1	0
2008	6	0
2009	6	0
2010	12	0
2011	11	0
2012	11	0
2013	14	0
2014	13	0
2015	11	1
2017	9	0
2018	6	0
2019	10	0
Total	110	1

=== Goals for Senior National Team ===
Scores and results list Oman's goal tally first.

#	Date	Venue	Opponent	Score	Result	Competition
1	8 October 2015	Sultan Qaboos Sports Complex, Muscat, Oman	Iran	1–0	1–1	2018 FIFA World Cup qualification

== Honours ==
Al-Oruba

- Oman Professional League: 2014–15
- Sultan Qaboos Cup: 2010, 2014–15
- Omani Super Cup: 2008

Al-Suwaiq

- Omani League: 2010–11
- Oman Super Cup runner-up 2010

Fanja

- Omani League: 2011–12
- Sultan Qaboos Cup: 2013
- Oman Super Cup runner-up: 2013

Dhofar

- Oman Super Cup runner-up 2012

== See also ==
- List of men's footballers with 100 or more international caps
