= Mohammed bin Zayed Stadium =

Multi-purpose stadium in Abu Dhabi, UAE

Al-Jazira Mohammed bin Zayed Stadium
- Al-Jazira Stadium
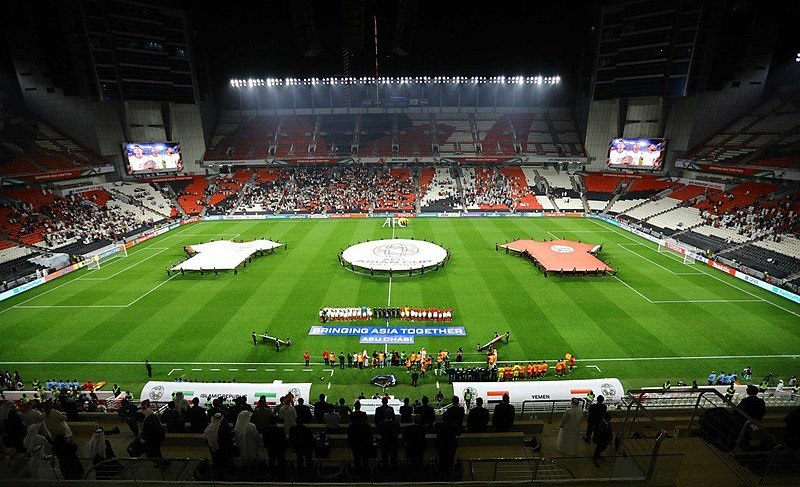
- Mohamed bin Zayed Stadium during a match of the 2019 AFC Asian Cup.
- Interactive map of Al-Jazira Mohammed bin Zayed Stadium
- Full name: Al-Jazira Mohammed bin Zayed Stadium
- Location: Abu Dhabi, United Arab Emirates
- Coordinates: 24°27′09.95″N 54°23′31.27″E
- Owner: Al-Jazira
- Operator: Al-Jazira
- Capacity: 15,000 (1979–2006); 24,000 (2006–2009); 42,056 (2010–2019); 36,186 (2019–2025)
- Surface: Grass
- Record attendance: 40,893; UAE vs Australia (6 September 2016)

Construction
- Groundbreaking: 2025; 1 year ago
- Built: 2026; 0 years ago
- Renovated: 2026; 0 years ago

Tenants
- United Arab Emirates national football team Al-Jazira

Al-Jazira Mohammed bin Zayed Stadium (Arabic: ستاد محمد بن زايد) is a multi-purpose stadium in Abu Dhabi, United Arab Emirates. It is currently used mostly for football and cricket matches and is the home ground of Al Jazira Club. It is named after Mohammed bin Zayed Al Nahyan.

== Capacity change ==
The stadium's original capacity was 15,000 but it was expanded. Half of the project was completed by December 2006 and the stadium hosted the 18th Arabian Gulf Cup the next month. The UAE won the tournament in the stadium which held 24,000 spectators. The stadium was expanded again for the 2019 AFC Asian Cup.

== Trivia ==
- Hosted 3 List A matches in 1999 between the A teams of India, Pakistan and Sri Lanka.
- Hosted 8 matches of the 2003 FIFA World Youth Championship.
- Hosted 3 matches of the 2009 and 2010 FIFA Club World Cups, along with the Zayed Sports City Stadium.

== 2019 AFC Asian Cup ==
Al-Jazira Mohammed bin Zayed Stadium hosted seven games for the 2019 AFC Asian Cup, including a round of 16 match, a quarter-final match and a semi-final match.

In the semi-final match between Qatar and hosts the United Arab Emirates, the UAE supporters threw bottles and footwear onto the pitch. This conduct was preceded by the UAE fans booing the Qatari national anthem. Qatar won 4–0 despite the situation, reaching their first Asian Cup final.

Date	Time	Team No. 1	Result	Team No. 2	Round	Attendance
7 January 2019	20:00	Iran	5–0	Yemen	Group D	5,301
11 January 2019	17:30	Philippines	0–3	China	Group C	16,013
15 January 2019	17:30	Palestine	0–0	Jordan	Group B	20,843
17 January 2019	17:30	Oman	3–1	Turkmenistan	Group F	8,338
20 January 2019	21:00	Iran	2–0	Oman	Round of 16	31,945
24 January 2019	20:00	China	0–3	Iran	Quarter-finals	19,578
29 January 2019	18:00	Qatar	4–0	United Arab Emirates	Semi-finals	38,646

== See also ==
- Lists of stadiums
- List of football stadiums in the United Arab Emirates

Preceded by Estadio Azteca; Mexico City	FIFA U-17 World Cup; Final venue 2013	Succeeded by Estadio Sausalito; Viña del Mar
