= Mohammed Al-Ghassani =

Omani footballer (born 1985)

Personal information
- Full name: Mohammed Saleh Abdullah Al-Ghassani
- Date of birth: 1 April 1985 (age 41)
- Place of birth: Al-Suwaiq, Oman
- Height: 1.71 m (5 ft 7 in)
- Position: Forward

Youth career
- 2002–2005: Al-Suwaiq

Senior career*
Years	Team	Apps	(Gls)
2005–2008	Al-Suwaiq	43	(0)
2008–2009	Al-Nahda	23	(0)
2009–2011	Saham	44	(0)
2011–2012	Al-Musannah	22	(7)
2012–2014	Al-Suwaiq	55	(21)
2014–2015	Al-Shabab		(8)
2015–2016	Al-Musannah		(4)
2016–2019	Saham		(46)
2019–2020	Al-Seeb	19	(4)
2020–2021	Saham	10	(4)
2021–2022	Al-Suwaiq	6	(0)
2022	Sur	6	(1)

International career^{‡}
2007–	Oman	23	(4)
- * Club domestic league appearances and goals ‡ National team caps and goals as of 8 December 2023

Mohammed Saleh Abdullah Al-Ghassani (Arabic: محمد صالح عبدالله الغساني; born 1 April 1985), commonly known as Mohammed Al-Ghassani, is an Omani footballer who plays for the Oman Professional League club, Sur.

== Club career ==
On 31 August 2014, he signed a one-year contract with Al-Shabab Club. Later on, he returned to two of his formers clubs, Al-Musannah and Saham.

== International career ==
Mohammed was selected for the national team for the first time in 2007. He has made appearances in the 2007 AFC Asian Cup qualification, 2011 AFC Asian Cup qualification and the 2010 FIFA World Cup qualification and has represented the national team in the 2014 FIFA World Cup qualification.

== Career statistics ==
=== Club ===
Club	Season	Division	League		Cup		Continental (Note: Includes appearances in the AFC Champions League and AFC Cup)		Other		Total	
Club	Season	Division	Apps	Goals	Apps	Goals	Apps	Goals	Apps	Goals	Apps	Goals
Saham	2010–11	Omani League	-	0	-	0	5	0	-	0	-	0
Saham	Total		-	0	-	0	5	0	-	0	-	0
Al-Musannah	2011–12	Oman Elite League	-	7	-	0	0	0	-	0	-	7
Al-Musannah	Total		-	7	-	0	0	0	-	0	-	7
Al-Suwaiq	2012–13	Oman Professional League	-	5	-	2	0	0	-	0	-	7
Al-Suwaiq	2013–14	Oman Professional League	-	16	-	0	6	3	-	0	-	19
Al-Suwaiq	Total		-	21	-	2	6	3	-	0	-	26
Career total			-	28	-	2	11	3	-	0	-	33

=== International ===
Scores and results list Oman's goal tally first.

Goal	Date	Venue	Opponent	Score	Result	Competition
1.	23 February 2012	Al-Seeb Stadium, Seeb, Oman	India	1–0	5–1	Friendly
2.	17 November 2015	Köpetdag Stadium, Ashgabat, Turkmenistan	Turkmenistan	1–2	1–2	2018 FIFA World Cup qualification
3.	13 December 2018	Sultan Qaboos Sports Complex, Muscat, Oman	Tajikistan	1–0	2–1	Friendly
4.	10 September 2019	Sultan Qaboos Sports Complex, Muscat, Oman	Lebanon	1–0	1–0	Friendly
5.	26 September 2021	Qatar University Stadium, Doha, Qatar	Nepal	4–1	7–2	Friendly
