= Javokhir Sidikov =

Uzbekistani footballer

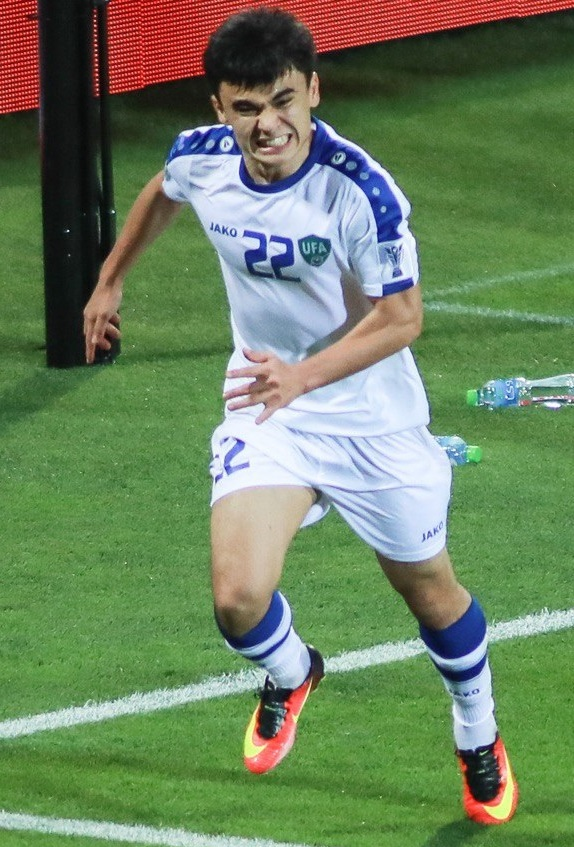

Personal information
- Full name: Javokhir Sidikov
- Date of birth: 8 December 1996 (age 29)
- Place of birth: Tashkent, Uzbekistan
- Height: 1.64 m (5 ft 5 in)
- Position: Midfielder

Team information
- Current team: FC Kokand 1912
- Number: 7

Youth career
- Pakhtakor

Senior career*
| Years | Team | Apps | (Gls) |
| 2015–2016 | Pakhtakor | 2 | (0) |
| 2016–2020 | Kokand 1912 | 69 | (11) |
| 2019–2020 | → Pakhtakor (loan) | 21 | (4) |
| 2021–2022 | Lokomotiv Tashkent | 21 | (2) |
| 2022–2023 | FC Kokand 1912 | 23 | (4) |
| 2023 | FC Nasaf (Loan) | 21 | (1) |
| 2024–2025 | FC Nasaf | 39 | (3) |
| 2026– | FC Kokand 1912 | 12 | (0) |

International career^{‡}
| 2013 | Uzbekistan U17 | 4 | (0) |
| 2014–2015 | Uzbekistan U19 | 6 | (0) |
| 2017–2018 | Uzbekistan U23 | 20 | (4) |
| 2018– | Uzbekistan | 13 | (1) |
Medal record
Representing Uzbekistan
Men's football
| Winner | China 2018 | Team |
- * Club domestic league appearances and goals as of 28 July 2026 ‡ National team caps and goals as of 23:14, 1 June 2019 (UTC)

Javokhir Sidikov (born 8 December 1996) is an Uzbek football midfielder who plays for FC Kokand 1912 in Uzbek League and the Uzbekistan national football team. He won AFC U-23 Championship in 2018.

== Club career ==
A pupil of the Tashkent "Pakhtakor". He played for the youth team of this club. In 2016, he played two matches for the main team of Pakhtakor.

Since 2016, he has been one of the main players of the Kokand 1912 club.

In 2013, he played four matches for the Uzbekistan U-17 youth national team. In 2014-2015, he played for the Uzbekistan U-19 youth national team, in which he played six matches. Since 2018, he has been playing for the youth (Olympic) national team of Uzbekistan. In January 2018, together with the youth national team of Uzbekistan, he won the Asian Youth Championship.

== International career ==
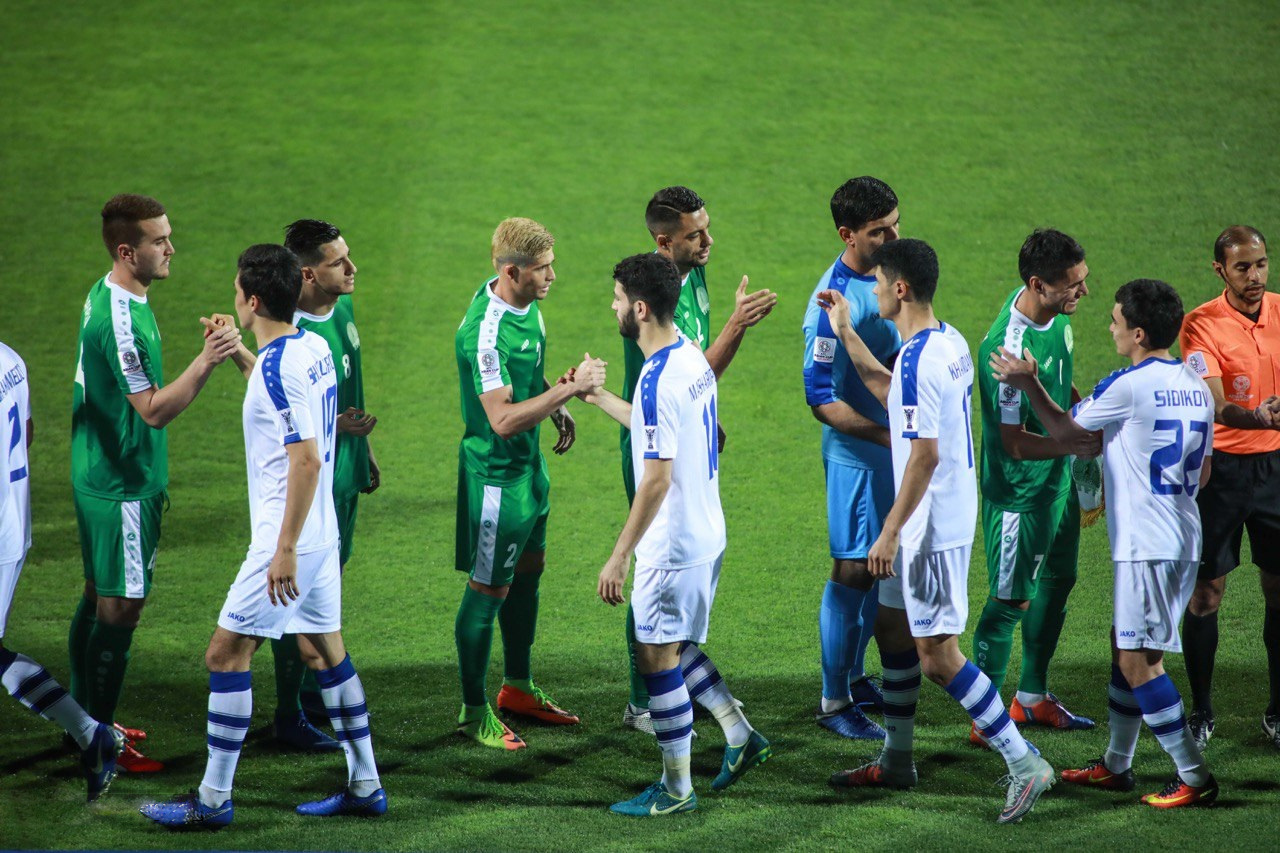
Javokhir Sidikov handshake with Arslanmyrat Amanow before the match Turkmenistan vs. Uzbekistan at 2019 AFC Asian Cup

In 2013, he made four appearances for the Uzbekistan under-17 youth team. In 2014-2015, he made 6 appearances for the Uzbekistan U20 youth team. Since 2018 he has been playing for the Youth (Olympic) team of Uzbekistan. In January 2018, together with the youth team of Uzbekistan, he won the Youth Asian Championship.

Sidikov made his debut for the Uzbekistan national team on 27 March 2018 in a match against the Morocco national team (2-0). He represented Uzbekistan at the 2019 AFC Asian Cup — a tournament during which he played 4 matches. In one of them — scored his first goal of the National color in a game with the Turkmenistan national team.

== Career statistics ==
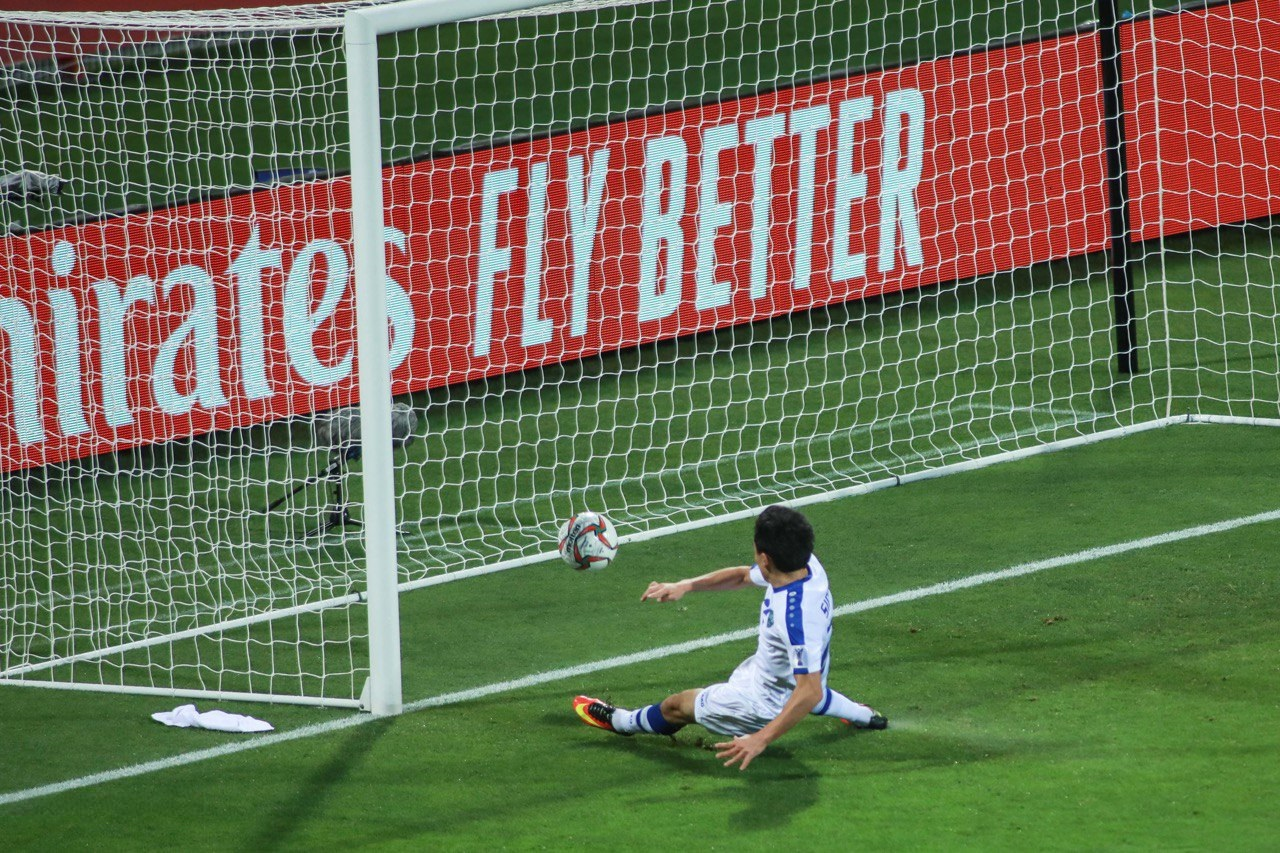
First goal moment

=== International goals ===
| No. | Date | Venue | Opponent | Score | Result | Competition |
|---|---|---|---|---|---|---|
| 1. | 13 January 2019 | Rashid Stadium, Dubai, United Arab Emirates | Turkmenistan | 1–0 | 4–0 | 2019 AFC Asian Cup |

== Honours ==
Pakhtakor

- Uzbekistan Super League (3) : 2015, 2019, 2020
- Uzbek Cup (2): 2019, 2020
- Uzbekistan League Cup (1) 2019

Uzbekistan U23

- AFC U-23 Asian Cup 2018
