= Ammar Al-Jeneibi =

Emirati professional football referee (born 1982)

Ammar Ali Abdulla Jumaa Al-Jeneibi
- Born: 1982 (age 43–44)

Domestic
Years	League	Role

International
Years	League	Role
2011–	FIFA listed	Referee

Ammar Ali Abdulla Jumaa Al-Jeneibi (born 1982) is an Emirati professional football referee. He has been a full international for FIFA since 2011. He refereed some matches in AFC Champions League.

== AFC Asian Cup ==
2019 AFC Asian Cup – United Arab Emirates
Date	Match	Venue	Round
13 January 2019	Turkmenistan v Uzbekistan	Dubai	Group stage
