= South Korea national football team results (2020–present) =

- Win Draw Loss

This article provides details of international football games played by the South Korea national football team from 2020 to present.

== Results by year ==
Year	Pld	W	D	L	Win %
2020	2	1	0	1	50.00
2021	10	7	2	1	70.00
2022	20	12	3	5	60.00
2023	10	5	3	2	50.00
2024	17	10	6	1	58.82
2025	13	8	3	2	61.54
2026	13	6	1	6	46.15
Total	85	49	18	18	57.65

== Matches ==
=== 2020 ===
14 November Friendly	Mexico	3–2	South Korea	Wiener Neustadt, Austria
21:00 UTC+1	Jiménez 67'; Antuna 69'; Salcedo 70'	Report	Hwang Ui-jo 20'; Kwon Kyung-won 87'	Stadium: Stadion Wiener Neustadt; Attendance: 0 Referee: Harald Lechner (Austria)

17 November Friendly	South Korea	2–1	Qatar	Maria Enzersdorf, Austria
14:00 UTC+1	Hwang Hee-chan 1'; Hwang Ui-jo 36'	Report	Ali 9'	Stadium: BSFZ-Arena; Attendance: 0 Referee: Julian Weinberger (Austria)

=== 2021 ===
25 March Friendly	Japan	3–0	South Korea	Yokohama, Japan
19:20 UTC+9	Yamane 16'; Kamada 27'; Endo 83'	Report		Stadium: Nissan Stadium; Referee: Rowan Arumughan (India)

5 June 2022 FIFA World Cup (Qualification)	South Korea	5–0	Turkmenistan	Goyang, South Korea
20:00 UTC+9	Hwang Ui-jo 10', 73'; Nam Tae-hee 45+2'; Kim Young-gwon 57'; Kwon Chang-hoon 63'	Report		Stadium: Goyang Stadium; Attendance: 3,932; Referee: Turki Al-Khudhayr (Saudi Arabia)

7 June 2022 FIFA World Cup (Qualification)	South Korea	Cancelled	North Korea	Goyang, South Korea
20:00 UTC+9		Report		Stadium: Goyang Stadium

9 June 2022 FIFA World Cup (Qualification)	Sri Lanka	0–5	South Korea	Goyang, South Korea
20:00 UTC+9		Report	Kim Shin-wook 14', 42' (pen.); Lee Dong-gyeong 22'; Hwang Hee-chan 53'; Jung Sang-bin 77'	Stadium: Goyang Stadium; Attendance: 4,008; Referee: Shen Yinhao (China)

13 June 2022 FIFA World Cup (Qualification)	South Korea	2–1	Lebanon	Goyang, South Korea
15:00 UTC+9	Sabra 50' (o.g.); Son Heung-min 65' (pen.)	Report	Saad 12'	Stadium: Goyang Stadium; Attendance: 4,061; Referee: Khamis Al-Marri (Qatar)

2 September 2022 FIFA World Cup (Qualification)	South Korea	0–0	Iraq	Seoul, South Korea
20:00 UTC+9		Report		Stadium: Seoul World Cup Stadium; Attendance: 0 Referee: Nawaf Shukralla (Bahrain)

7 September 2022 FIFA World Cup (Qualification)	South Korea	1–0	Lebanon	Suwon, South Korea
20:00 UTC+9	Kwon Chang-hoon 59'	Report		Stadium: Suwon World Cup Stadium; Attendance: 0 Referee: Ryuji Sato (Japan)

7 October 2022 FIFA World Cup (Qualification)	South Korea	2–1	Syria	Ansan, South Korea
20:00 UTC+9	Hwang In-beom 47'; Son Heung-min 88'	Report	Kharbin 83'	Stadium: Ansan Wa~ Stadium; Attendance: 0 Referee: Abdulrahman Al-Jassim (Qatar)

12 October 2022 FIFA World Cup (Qualification)	Iran	1–1	South Korea	Tehran, Iran
17:00 UTC+3:30	Jahanbakhsh 76'	Report	Son Heung-min 48'	Stadium: Azadi Stadium; Referee: Ahmed Al-Kaf (Oman)

11 November 2022 FIFA World Cup (Qualification)	South Korea	1–0	United Arab Emirates	Goyang, South Korea
20:00 UTC+9	Hwang Hee-chan 36' (pen.)	Report		Stadium: Goyang Stadium; Attendance: 30,152; Referee: Ma Ning (China PR)

16 November 2022 FIFA World Cup (Qualification)	Iraq	0–3	South Korea	Al Rayyan, Qatar
18:00 UTC+3		Report	Lee Jae-sung 33'; Son Heung-min 74' (pen.); Jeong Woo-yeong 80'	Stadium: Thani bin Jassim Stadium; Attendance: 0 Referee: Ilgiz Tantashev (Uzbekistan)

=== 2022 ===
15 January Friendly	Iceland	1–5	South Korea	Antalya, Turkey
14:00 UTC+3	Guðjohnsen 55'	Report	Cho Gue-sung 15'; Kwon Chang-hoon 27'; Paik Seung-ho 29'; Kim Jin-gyu 75'; Eom Ji-sung 85'	Stadium: Mardan Sports Complex; Attendance: 0 Referee: Ali Palabıyık (Turkey)

21 January Friendly	South Korea	4–0	Moldova	Antalya, Turkey
14:00 UTC+3	Kim Jin-gyu 20'; Paik Seung-ho 33'; Kwon Chang-hoon 48'; Cho Young-wook 90+3' (pen.)	Report		Stadium: Mardan Sports Complex; Referee: Abdulkadir Bitigen (Turkey)

27 January 2022 FIFA World Cup (Qualification)	Lebanon	0–1	South Korea	Sidon, Lebanon
14:00 UTC+2		Report	Cho Gue-sung 45+1'	Stadium: Saida Municipal Stadium; Attendance: 5,400; Referee: Ahmed Al-Kaf (Oman)

1 February 2022 FIFA World Cup (Qualification)	Syria	0–2	South Korea	Dubai, United Arab Emirates
18:00 UTC+4		Report	Kim Jin-su 53'; Kwon Chang-hoon 71'	Stadium: Rashid Stadium; Attendance: 310; Referee: Hiroyuki Kimura (Japan)

24 March 2022 FIFA World Cup (Qualification)	South Korea	2–0	Iran	Seoul ,South Korea
20:00 UTC+9	Son Heung-min 45+2'; Kim Young-gwon 62'	Report		Stadium: Seoul World Cup Stadium; Attendance: 64,375; Referee: Chris Beath (Australia)

29 March 2022 FIFA World Cup (Qualification)	United Arab Emirates	1–0	South Korea	Dubai, United Arab Emirates
17:45 UTC+4	Al-Maazmi 54'	Report		Stadium: Al Maktoum Stadium; Referee: Ahmed Al-Kaf (Oman)

2 June Friendly	South Korea	1–5	Brazil	Seoul, South Korea
20:00 UTC+9	Hwang Ui-jo 31'	Report	Richarlison 7'; Neymar 42' (pen.), 57' (pen.); Coutinho 80'; Gabriel Jesus 90+3'	Stadium: Seoul World Cup Stadium; Attendance: 64,872; Referee: Ryuji Sato (Japan)

6 June Friendly	South Korea	2–0	Chile	Daejeon, South Korea
20:00 UTC+9	Hwang Hee-chan 12'; Son Heung-min 90+1'	Report		Stadium: Daejeon World Cup Stadium; Attendance: 40,135; Referee: Ryuji Sato (Japan)

10 June Friendly	South Korea	2–2	Paraguay	Suwon, South Korea
20:00 UTC+9	Son Heung-min 66'; Jeong Woo-yeong 90+3'	Report	Almirón 23', 49'	Stadium: Suwon World Cup Stadium; Attendance: 40,228; Referee: Jérémie Pignard (France)

14 June Friendly	South Korea	4–1	Egypt	Seoul, South Korea
20:00 UTC+9	Hwang Ui-jo 16'; Kim Young-gwon 21'; Cho Gue-sung 85'; Kwon Chang-hoon 90+1'	Report	Mohamed 37'	Stadium: Seoul World Cup Stadium; Attendance: 59,712; Referee: Jérémie Pignard (France)

20 July 2022 EAFF Championship	China	0–3	South Korea	Toyota, Japan
19:00 UTC+9		Report	Zhu Chenjie 39' (o.g.); Kwon Chang-hoon 54'; Cho Gue-sung 80'	Stadium: Toyota Stadium; Attendance: 200; Referee: Akhrol Riskullaev (Uzbekistan)

24 July 2022 EAFF Championship	South Korea	3–0	Hong Kong	Toyota, Japan
16:00 UTC+9	Kang Seong-jin 17', 86'; Hong Chul 74'	Report		Stadium: Toyota Stadium; Attendance: 4,335; Referee: Nazmi Nasaruddin (Malaysia)

27 July 2022 EAFF Championship	Japan	3–0	South Korea	Toyota, Japan
19:20 UTC+9	Soma 49'; Sasaki 64'; Machino 72'	Report		Stadium: Toyota Stadium; Attendance: 14,117; Referee: Akhrol Riskullaev (Uzbekistan)

23 September Friendly	South Korea	2–2	Costa Rica	Goyang, South Korea
20:00 UTC+9	Hwang Hee-chan 28'; Son Heung-min 85'	Report	Bennette 41', 63'	Stadium: Goyang Stadium; Attendance: 37,581; Referee: Alex King (Australia)

27 September Friendly	South Korea	1–0	Cameroon	Seoul, South Korea
20:00 UTC+9	Son Heung-min 35'	Report		Stadium: Seoul World Cup Stadium; Attendance: 59,389; Referee: Alex King (Australia)

11 November Friendly	South Korea	1–0	Iceland	Hwaseong, South Korea
20:00 UTC+9	Song Min-kyu 33'	Report		Stadium: Hwaseong Stadium; Attendance: 15,274; Referee: Jumpei Iida (Japan)

24 November 2022 FIFA World Cup (Group H)	Uruguay	0–0	South Korea	Al Rayyan, Qatar
16:00 UTC+3		Report		Stadium: Education City Stadium; Attendance: 41,663; Referee: Clément Turpin (France)

28 November 2022 FIFA World Cup (Group H)	South Korea	2–3	Ghana	Al Rayyan, Qatar
16:00 UTC+3	Cho Gue-sung 58', 61'	Report	Salisu 24'; Kudus 34', 68'	Stadium: Education City Stadium; Attendance: 43,983; Referee: Anthony Taylor (England)

2 December 2022 FIFA World Cup (Group H)	South Korea	2–1	Portugal	Al Rayyan, Qatar
18:00 UTC+3	Kim Young-gwon 27'; Hwang Hee-chan 90+1'	Report	Horta 5'	Stadium: Education City Stadium; Attendance: 44,097; Referee: Facundo Tello (Argentina)

5 December 2022 FIFA World Cup (Round of 16)	Brazil	4–1	South Korea	Doha, Qatar
22:00 UTC+3	Vinícius 7'; Neymar 13' (pen.); Richarlison 29'; Paquetá 36'	Report	Paik Seung-ho 76'	Stadium: Stadium 974; Attendance: 43,847; Referee: Clément Turpin (France)

=== 2023 ===
24 March Friendly	South Korea	2–2	Colombia	Ulsan, South Korea
20:00 UTC+9	Son Heung-min 10', 45+2'	Report	Rodríguez 46'; Carrascal 49'	Stadium: Ulsan Munsu Football Stadium; Attendance: 35,727; Referee: Jumpei Iida (Japan)

28 March Friendly	South Korea	1–2	Uruguay	Seoul, South Korea
20:00 UTC+9	Hwang In-beom 51'	Report	Coates 10'; Vecino 63'	Stadium: Seoul World Cup Stadium; Attendance: 63,952; Referee: Yudai Yamamoto (Japan)

16 June Friendly	South Korea	0–1	Peru	Busan, South Korea
20:00 UTC+9		Report	Reyna 11'	Stadium: Busan Asiad Main Stadium; Attendance: 52,443; Referee: Shaun Evans (Australia)

20 June Friendly	South Korea	1–1	El Salvador	Daejeon, South Korea
20:00 UTC+9	Hwang Ui-jo 49'	Report	Roldán 87'	Stadium: Daejeon World Cup Stadium; Attendance: 39,823; Referee: Muhammad Taqi (Singapore)

7 September Friendly	Wales	0–0	South Korea	Cardiff, Wales
19:45 UTC+1		Report		Stadium: Cardiff City Stadium; Attendance: 13,668; Referee: Willie Collum (Scotland)

12 September Friendly	Saudi Arabia	0–1	South Korea	Newcastle upon Tyne, England
17:30 UTC+1		Report	Cho Gue-sung 32'	Stadium: St James' Park; Attendance: 3,000; Referee: Andrew Madley (England)

13 October Friendly	South Korea	4–0	Tunisia	Seoul, South Korea
20:00 UTC+9	Lee Kang-in 55', 57'; Meriah 66' (o.g.); Hwang Ui-jo 90+1'	Report		Stadium: Seoul World Cup Stadium; Attendance: 59,018; Referee: Amirul Izwan Yaacob (Malaysia)

17 October Friendly	South Korea	6–0	Vietnam	Suwon, South Korea
20:00 UTC+9	Kim Min-jae 5'; Hwang Hee-chan 27'; Võ Minh Trọng 50' (o.g.); Son Heung-min 61'; Lee Kang-in 70'; Jeong Woo-yeong 86'	Report		Stadium: Suwon World Cup Stadium; Attendance: 42,175; Referee: Amirul Izwan Yaacob (Malaysia)

16 November 2026 FIFA World Cup (Qualification)	South Korea	5–0	Singapore	Seoul, South Korea
20:00 UTC+9	Cho Gue-sung 44'; Hwang Hee-chan 49'; Son Heung-min 63'; Hwang Ui-jo 68' (pen.); Lee Kang-in 85'	Report (FIFA); Report (AFC)		Stadium: Seoul World Cup Stadium; Attendance: 64,381; Referee: Bijan Heydari (Iran)

21 November 2026 FIFA World Cup (Qualification)	China	0–3	South Korea	Shenzhen, China
20:00 UTC+8		Report (FIFA); Report (AFC)	Son Heung-min 11' (pen.), 45'; Jung Seung-hyun 87'	Stadium: Shenzhen Universiade Sports Centre; Attendance: 39,969; Referee: Abdulrahman Al-Jassim (Qatar)

=== 2024 ===
6 January Friendly	South Korea	1–0	Iraq	Abu Dhabi, United Arab Emirates
17:00 UTC+4	Lee Jae-sung 40'	Report		Stadium: New York University Stadium; Attendance: 100; Referee: Yahya Al-Mulla (United Arab Emirates)

15 January 2023 AFC Asian Cup (Group E)	South Korea	3–1	Bahrain	Al Rayyan, Qatar
14:30 UTC+3	Hwang In-beom 38'; Lee Kang-in 56', 68'	Report	Al-Hashsash 51'	Stadium: Jassim bin Hamad Stadium; Attendance: 8,388; Referee: Ma Ning (China)

20 January 2023 AFC Asian Cup (Group E)	Jordan	2–2	South Korea	Doha, Qatar
14:30 UTC+3	Park Yong-woo 37' (o.g.); Al-Naimat 45+6'	Report	Son Heung-min 9' (pen.); Al-Arab 90+1' (o.g.)	Stadium: Al Thumama Stadium; Attendance: 36,627; Referee: Salman Falahi (Qatar)

25 January 2023 AFC Asian Cup (Group E)	South Korea	3–3	Malaysia	Al Wakrah, Qatar
14:30 UTC+3	Jeong Woo-yeong 21'; Lee Kang-in 83'; Son Heung-min 90+4' (pen.)	Report	Faisal 51'; Arif 62' (pen.); Morales 90+15'	Stadium: Al Janoub Stadium; Attendance: 30,117; Referee: Khalid Al-Turais (Saudi Arabia)

30 January 2023 AFC Asian Cup (Round of 16)	Saudi Arabia	1–1 (a.e.t.) (2–4 p)	South Korea	Al Rayyan, Qatar
19:00 UTC+3	Radif 46'	Report	Cho Gue-sung 90+9'	Stadium: Education City Stadium; Attendance: 42,389; Referee: Ilgiz Tantashev (Uzbekistan)
	Penalties
	Kanno (penalty scored); Abdulhamid (penalty scored); Al-Najei (penalty missed); Ghareeb (penalty missed)		(penalty scored) Son Heung-min; (penalty scored) Kim Young-gwon; (penalty scored) Cho Gue-sung; (penalty scored) Hwang Hee-chan

2 February 2023 AFC Asian Cup (Quarter-finals)	Australia	1–2 (a.e.t.)	South Korea	Al Wakrah, Qatar
18:30 UTC+3	Goodwin 42'	Report	Hwang Hee-chan 90+6' (pen.); Son Heung-min 104'	Stadium: Al Janoub Stadium; Attendance: 39,632; Referee: Ahmed Al-Kaf (Oman)

6 February 2023 AFC Asian Cup (Semi-finals)	Jordan	2–0	South Korea	Al Rayyan, Qatar
18:00 UTC+3	Al-Naimat 53'; Al-Taamari 66'	Report		Stadium: Ahmad bin Ali Stadium; Attendance: 42,850; Referee: Mohammed Abdulla Hassan Mohamed (United Arab Emirates)

21 March 2026 FIFA World Cup (Qualification)	South Korea	1–1	Thailand	Seoul, South Korea
20:00 UTC+9	Son Heung-min 42'	Report	Mueanta 61'	Stadium: Seoul World Cup Stadium; Attendance: 64,912; Referee: Khalid Al-Turais (Saudi Arabia)

26 March 2026 FIFA World Cup (Qualification)	Thailand	0–3	South Korea	Bangkok, Thailand
19:30 UTC+7		Report	Lee Jae-sung 19'; Son Heung-min 54'; Park Jin-seob 82'	Stadium: Rajamangala Stadium; Attendance: 45,458; Referee: Adham Makhadmeh (Jordan)

6 June 2026 FIFA World Cup (Qualification)	Singapore	0–7	South Korea	Kallang, Singapore
20:00 UTC+8		Report	Lee Kang-in 9', 54'; Joo Min-kyu 20'; Son Heung-min 53', 56'; Bae Jun-ho 79'; Hwang Hee-chan 82'	Stadium: National Stadium; Attendance: 49,097; Referee: Sadullo Gulmurodi (Tajikistan)

11 June 2026 FIFA World Cup (Qualification)	South Korea	1–0	China	Seoul, South Korea
20:00 UTC+9	Lee Kang-in 61'	Report		Stadium: Seoul World Cup Stadium; Attendance: 64,935; Referee: Mohammed Al Hoish (Saudi Arabia)

5 September 2026 FIFA World Cup (Qualification)	South Korea	0–0	Palestine	Seoul, South Korea
20:00 UTC+9		Report		Stadium: Seoul World Cup Stadium; Attendance: 59,579; Referee: Alireza Faghani (Australia)

10 September 2026 FIFA World Cup (Qualification)	Oman	1–3	South Korea	Muscat, Oman
18:00 UTC+4	Jung Seung-hyun 45+2' (o.g.)	Report	Hwang Hee-chan 10'; Son Heung-min 82'; Joo Min-kyu 90+11'	Stadium: Sultan Qaboos Sports Complex; Referee: Ma Ning (China)

10 October 2026 FIFA World Cup (Qualification)	Jordan	0–2	South Korea	Amman, Jordan
17:00 UTC+3		Report	Lee Jae-sung 38'; Oh Hyeon-gyu 68'	Stadium: Amman International Stadium; Referee: Hiroyuki Kimura (Japan)

15 October 2026 FIFA World Cup (Qualification)	South Korea	3–2	Iraq	Yongin, South Korea
20:00 UTC+9	Oh Se-hun 41'; Oh Hyeon-gyu 74'; Lee Jae-sung 83'	Report	Hussein 50'; Bayesh 90+5'	Stadium: Yongin Mireu Stadium; Attendance: 35,198; Referee: Rustam Lutfullin (Uzbekistan)

14 November 2026 FIFA World Cup (Qualification)	Kuwait	1–3	South Korea	Kuwait City, Kuwait
17:00 UTC+3	Daham 60'		Oh Se-hun 10'; Son Heung-min 19' (pen.); Bae Jun-ho 74'	Stadium: Jaber Al-Ahmad International Stadium, Kuwait City; Attendance: 22,791; Referee: Shaun Evans (Australia)

19 November 2026 FIFA World Cup (Qualification)	Palestine	1–1	South Korea	Amman, Jordan
17:00 UTC+3	Qunbar 12'	Report	Son Heung-min 16'	Stadium: Amman International Stadium; Attendance: 2,405; Referee: Yusuke Araki (Japan)

=== 2025 ===
20 March 2026 FIFA World Cup (Qualification)	South Korea	1–1	Oman	Goyang, South Korea
20:00 UTC+9	Hwang Hee-chan 41'	Report	Al-Busaidi 80'	Stadium: Goyang Stadium; Attendance: 35,212; Referee: Alireza Faghani (Australia)

25 March 2026 FIFA World Cup (Qualification)	South Korea	1–1	Jordan	Suwon, South Korea
20:00 UTC+9	Lee Jae-sung 5'	Report	Kwon Kyung-won 30' (o.g.)	Stadium: Suwon World Cup Stadium; Attendance: 41,582; Referee: Ilgiz Tantashev (Uzbekistan)

5 June 2026 FIFA World Cup (Qualification)	Iraq	0–2	South Korea	Basra, Iraq
21:15 UTC+3		Report	Kim Jin-gyu 63'; Oh Hyeon-gyu 82'	Stadium: Basra International Stadium; Attendance: 55,972; Referee: Yusuke Araki (Japan)

10 June 2026 FIFA World Cup (Qualification)	South Korea	4–0	Kuwait	Seoul, South Korea
20:00 UTC+9	Al Hajeri 30' (o.g.); Lee Kang-in 51'; Oh Hyeon-gyu 54'; Lee Jae-sung 72'	Report		Stadium: Seoul World Cup Stadium; Attendance: 41,911; Referee: Majed Al-Shamrani (Saudi Arabia)

7 July 2025 EAFF Championship	South Korea	3–0	China	Yongin, South Korea
20:00 UTC+9	Lee Dong-gyeong 8'; Joo Min-kyu 21'; Kim Ju-sung 56'	Report		Stadium: Yongin Mireu Stadium; Attendance: 4,426; Referee: Tuan Yaasin (Malaysia)

11 July 2025 EAFF Championship	South Korea	2–0	Hong Kong	Yongin, South Korea
20:00 UTC+9	Kang Sang-yoon 27'; Lee Ho-jae 67'	Report		Stadium: Yongin Mireu Stadium; Attendance: 5,521; Referee: Ahmad A'Qashah (Singapore)

15 July 2025 EAFF Championship	South Korea	0–1	Japan	Yongin, South Korea
19:24 UTC+9		Report	Germain 8'	Stadium: Yongin Mireu Stadium; Attendance: 18,418; Referee: Tuan Yaasin (Malaysia)

6 September Friendly	United States	0–2	South Korea	Harrison, New Jersey, United States
17:00 UTC−4		Report	Son Heung-min 18'; Lee Dong-gyeong 43'	Stadium: Sports Illustrated Stadium; Attendance: 26,500; Referee: Reon Radix (Grenada)

9 September Friendly	Mexico	2–2	South Korea	Nashville, Tennessee, United States
20:00 UTC−5	Jiménez 22'; Giménez 90+4'	Report	Son Heung-min 65'; Oh Hyeon-gyu 75'	Stadium: Geodis Park; Attendance: 27,604; Referee: Guido Gonzales Jr. (United States)

10 October Friendly	South Korea	0–5	Brazil	Seoul, South Korea
20:00 UTC+9		Report	Estêvão 13', 47'; Rodrygo 41', 49'; Vinícius 77'	Stadium: Seoul World Cup Stadium; Attendance: 63,237; Referee: Abdulrahman Al-Jassim (Qatar)

14 October Friendly	South Korea	2–0	Paraguay	Seoul, South Korea
20:00 UTC+9	Eom Ji-sung 15'; Oh Hyeon-gyu 75'	Report		Stadium: Seoul World Cup Stadium; Attendance: 22,206; Referee: Yusuke Araki (Japan)

14 November Friendly	South Korea	2–0	Bolivia	Daejeon, South Korea
20:00 UTC+9	Son Heung-min 57'; Cho Gue-sung 88'	Report		Stadium: Daejeon World Cup Stadium; Attendance: 33,852; Referee: Ma Ning (China)

18 November Friendly	South Korea	1–0	Ghana	Seoul, South Korea
20:00 UTC+9	Lee Tae-seok 63'	Report		Stadium: Seoul World Cup Stadium; Attendance: 33,256; Referee: Ahmed Al-Ali (Kuwait)

=== 2026 ===
28 March Friendly	South Korea	0–4	Ivory Coast	Milton Keynes, England
14:00 UTC+0		Report	Guessand 35'; Adingra 45+1'; Godo 62'; Singo 90+3'	Stadium: Stadium MK; Attendance: 5,917; Referee: Ian McNabb (Northern Ireland)

31 March Friendly	Austria	1–0	South Korea	Vienna, Austria
20:45 UTC+2	Sabitzer 48'	Report		Stadium: Ernst-Happel-Stadion; Attendance: 35,300; Referee: Sander van der Eijk (Netherlands)

30 May Friendly	South Korea	5–0	Trinidad and Tobago	Provo, Utah, United States
19:00 UTC−6	Son Heung-min 40', 43' (pen.); Cho Gue-sung 65', 77'; Hwang Hee-chan 75' (pen.)	Report		Stadium: South Field; Attendance: 3,454; Referee: Victor Rivas (United States)

3 June Friendly	South Korea	1–0	El Salvador	Provo, Utah, United States
19:00 UTC−6	Lee Dong-gyeong 54'	Report		Stadium: South Field; Referee: Natalie Simon (United States)

11 June 2026 FIFA World Cup (Group A)	South Korea	2–1	Czech Republic	Zapopan, Mexico
20:00 UTC−6	Hwang In-beom 67'; Oh Hyeon-gyu 80'	Report	Krejčí 59'	Stadium: Estadio Akron; Attendance: 44,985; Referee: Amin Omar (Egypt)

18 June 2026 FIFA World Cup (Group A)	Mexico	1–0	South Korea	Zapopan, Mexico
19:00 UTC−6	Romo 50'	Report		Stadium: Estadio Akron; Attendance: 45,522; Referee: Gustavo Tejera (Uruguay)

24 June 2026 FIFA World Cup (Group A)	South Africa	1–0	South Korea	Guadalupe, Mexico
19:00 UTC−6	Maseko 63'	Report		Stadium: Estadio BBVA; Attendance: 51,243; Referee: Facundo Tello (Argentina)

24 September Friendly	South Korea	3–0	Ecuador	Suwon, South Korea
20:00 UTC+9	Oh Hyeon-gyu 54'; Son Heung-min 58'; Lee Dong-gyeong 86'	Report		Stadium: Suwon World Cup Stadium; Attendance: 33,953; Referee: Shen Yinhao (China)

28 September Friendly	South Korea	1–4	Uruguay	Seoul, South Korea
20:00 UTC+9	Son Heung-min 80'	Report	Nunez 13', 62'; de Arrascaeta 27'; Kim Min-jae 43' (o.g.)	Stadium: Seoul World Cup Stadium; Attendance: 48,024; Referee: Ma Ning (China)

2 October Friendly	South Korea	0–0	Venezuela	Ulsan, South Korea
20:00 UTC+9				Stadium: Ulsan Munsu Football Stadium; Attendance: 35,911; Referee: Alireza Faghani (Australia)

6 October Friendly	South Korea	2–0	Uzbekistan	Yongin, South Korea
20:00 UTC+9	Son Heung-min 6'; Oh Se-hun 60'	Report		Stadium: Yongin Mireu Stadium; Attendance: 24,587; Referee: Alex King (Australia)

13 November Friendly	Saudi Arabia	3–2	South Korea	Al Rayyan, Qatar
17:30 UTC−4	Al-Sahafi 45+1'; Kanno 57'; Al-Amri 59'	Report	Oh Hyeon-gyu 47'; Lee Jae-sung 69'	Stadium: Jassim bin Hamad Stadium; Referee: Mohammed Ahmed Al-Shammari (Qatar)

17 November Friendly	Qatar	0–1	South Korea	Doha, Qatar
17:00 UTC+3		Report	Oh Se-hun 43'	Stadium: Abdullah bin Khalifa Stadium; Referee: Mohamed Ebrahim Saad (Bahrain)

== Head-to-head record ==
As of 17 November 2026 after the match against Qatar.

Opponent	Pld	W	D	L	GF	GA	GD	Win %
Australia	1	1	0	0	2	1	+1	100.00
Austria	1	0	0	1	0	1	−1	0.00
Bahrain	1	1	0	0	3	1	+2	100.00
Bolivia	1	1	0	0	2	0	+2	100.00
Brazil	3	0	0	3	2	14	−12	0.00
Cameroon	1	1	0	0	1	0	+1	100.00
China	4	4	0	0	10	0	+10	100.00
Chile	1	1	0	0	2	0	+2	100.00
Colombia	1	0	1	0	2	2	+0	0.00
Costa Rica	1	0	1	0	2	2	+0	0.00
Czech Republic	1	1	0	0	2	1	+1	100.00
Ecuador	1	1	0	0	3	0	+3	100.00
Egypt	1	1	0	0	4	1	+3	100.00
El Salvador	2	1	1	0	2	1	+1	50.00
Ghana	2	1	0	1	3	3	+0	50.00
Hong Kong	2	2	0	0	5	0	+5	100.00
Iceland	2	2	0	0	6	1	+5	100.00
Iran	2	1	1	0	3	1	+2	50.00
Iraq	5	4	1	0	9	2	+7	80.00
Ivory Coast	1	0	0	1	0	4	−4	0.00
Japan	3	0	0	3	0	7	−7	0.00
Jordan	4	1	2	1	5	5	+0	25.00
Kuwait	2	2	0	0	7	1	+6	100.00
Lebanon	3	3	0	0	4	1	+3	100.00
Malaysia	1	0	1	0	3	3	+0	0.00
Mexico	3	0	1	2	4	6	−2	0.00
Moldova	1	1	0	0	4	0	+4	100.00
Oman	2	1	1	0	4	2	+2	50.00
Palestine	2	0	2	0	1	1	+0	0.00
Paraguay	2	1	1	0	4	2	+2	50.00
Peru	1	0	0	1	0	1	−1	0.00
Portugal	1	1	0	0	2	1	+1	100.00
Qatar	2	2	0	0	3	1	+2	100.00
Saudi Arabia	3	1	1	1	4	4	+0	33.33
Singapore	2	2	0	0	12	0	+12	100.00
South Africa	1	0	0	1	0	1	−1	0.00
Sri Lanka	1	1	0	0	5	0	+5	100.00
Syria	2	2	0	0	4	1	+3	100.00
Thailand	2	1	1	0	4	1	+3	50.00
Trinidad and Tobago	1	1	0	0	5	0	+5	100.00
Tunisia	1	1	0	0	4	0	+4	100.00
Turkmenistan	1	1	0	0	5	0	+5	100.00
United Arab Emirates	2	1	0	1	1	1	+0	50.00
United States	1	1	0	0	2	0	+2	100.00
Uruguay	3	0	1	2	2	6	−4	0.00
Uzbekistan	1	1	0	0	2	0	+2	100.00
Venezuela	1	0	1	0	0	0	+0	0.00
Vietnam	1	1	0	0	6	0	+6	100.00
Wales	1	0	1	0	0	0	+0	0.00
Total	85	49	18	18	160	80	+80	57.65

== See also ==
- South Korea national football team results
