= South Korea national football team results (2010–2019) =

- Win Draw Loss

This is a list of football games played by the South Korea national football team between 2010 and 2019.

== Results by year ==
Year	Pld	W	D	L	Win %
2010	19	10	2	7	52.63
2011	16	10	4	2	62.50
2012	9	5	1	3	55.56
2013	15	5	4	6	33.33
2014	15	5	1	9	33.33
2015	19	15	3	1	78.95
2016	11	8	1	2	72.73
2017	13	4	5	4	30.77
2018	19	7	6	6	36.84
2019	18	12	4	2	66.67
Total	154	81	31	42	52.60

== Matches ==
=== 2010 ===
9 January Friendly	South Korea	2–4	Zambia	Johannesburg, South Africa
16:30	Kim Jung-woo 35'; Koo Ja-cheol 83'	Report	F. Katongo 7'; Kalaba 15'; Chamanga 58'; Chivuta 73'	Stadium: Rand Stadium; Attendance: 2,000; Referee: Victor Gornes (South Africa)

18 January Friendly	South Korea	2–0	Finland	Málaga, Spain
15:30	Oh Beom-seok 39'; Lee Jung-soo 61'	Report		Stadium: Estadio Ciudad de Málaga; Attendance: 270; Referee: Fernandez Borbalon (Spain)

22 January Friendly	South Korea	1–0	Latvia	Málaga, Spain
15:10	Kim Jae-sung 55'	Report		Stadium: Estadio Ciudad de Málaga; Attendance: 150; Referee: Carlos Velasco Carballo (Spain)

7 February 2010 EAFF Championship	South Korea	5–0	Hong Kong	Tokyo, Japan
19:15	Kim Jung-woo 10'; Koo Ja-cheol 24'; Lee Dong-gook 32'; Lee Seung-ryul 37'; No Byung-jun 90+3'	Report		Stadium: Japan National Stadium; Attendance: 2,728; Referee: Ryuji Sato (Japan)

10 February 2010 EAFF Championship	South Korea	0–3	China	Tokyo, Japan
19:15		Report	Yu Hai 5'; Gao Lin 27'; Deng Zhuoxiang 60'	Stadium: Ajinomoto Stadium; Attendance: 3,629; Referee: Ng Kai Lam (Hong Kong)

14 February 2010 EAFF Championship	Japan	1–3	South Korea	Tokyo, Japan
19:15	Endō 23' (pen.)	Report	Lee Dong-gook 33' (pen.); Lee Seung-ryul 39'; Kim Jae-sung 70'	Stadium: Japan National Stadium; Attendance: 42,951; Referee: Strebre Delovski (Australia)

3 March Friendly	South Korea	2–0	Ivory Coast	London, England
14:30	Lee Dong-gook 4'; Kwak Tae-hwi 90+2'	Report		Stadium: Loftus Road; Attendance: 5,000; Referee: Andre Morriner (England)

16 May Friendly	South Korea	2–0	Ecuador	Seoul, South Korea
19:00	Lee Seung-ryul 73'; Lee Chung-yong 84'	Report		Stadium: Seoul World Cup Stadium; Attendance: 62,209; Referee: Porached Wongkamdee (Thailand)

24 May Friendly	Japan	0–2	South Korea	Saitama, Japan
19:20		Report	Park Ji-sung 6'; Park Chu-young 90+1' (pen.)	Stadium: Saitama Stadium 2002; Attendance: 57,873; Referee: Stuart Attwell (England)

30 May Friendly	South Korea	0–1	Belarus	Kufstein, Austria
15:00		Report	Kislyak 52'	Stadium: Kufstein Arena; Attendance: 300; Referee: Bernhard Brugger (Austria)

3 June Friendly	South Korea	0–1	Spain	Innsbruck, Austria
18:00		Report	Navas 86'	Stadium: Tivoli Stadion Tirol; Attendance: 8,000; Referee: Robert Schörgenhofer (Austria)

12 June 2010 FIFA World Cup (Group B)	South Korea	2–0	Greece	Port Elizabeth, South Africa
13:30	Lee Jung-soo 7'; Park Ji-sung 52'	Report		Stadium: Nelson Mandela Bay Stadium; Attendance: 31,513; Referee: Michael Hester (New Zealand)

17 June 2010 FIFA World Cup (Group B)	South Korea	1–4	Argentina	Johannesburg, South Africa
13:30	Lee Chung-yong 45+1'	Report	Park Chu-young 17' (o.g.); Higuaín 33', 76', 80'	Stadium: Soccer City; Attendance: 82,174; Referee: Frank De Bleeckere (Belgium)

22 June 2010 FIFA World Cup (Group B)	South Korea	2–2	Nigeria	Durban, South Africa
20:30	Lee Jung-soo 38'; Park Chu-young 49'	Report	Uche 12'; Yakubu 69' (pen.)	Stadium: Moses Mabhida Stadium; Attendance: 61,874; Referee: Olegário Benquerença (Portugal)

26 June 2010 FIFA World Cup (Round of 16)	South Korea	1–2	Uruguay	Port Elizabeth, South Africa
16:00	Lee Chung-yong 68'	Report	Suárez 8', 80'	Stadium: Nelson Mandela Bay Stadium; Attendance: 30,597; Referee: Wolfgang Stark (Germany)

11 August Friendly	South Korea	2–1	Nigeria	Suwon, South Korea
20:00	Yoon Bit-garam 16'; Choi Hyo-jin 44'	Report	Odemwingie 26'	Stadium: Suwon World Cup Stadium; Attendance: 40,331; Referee: Yuichi Nishimura (Japan)

7 September Friendly	South Korea	0–1	Iran	Seoul, South Korea
20:00		Report	Shojaei 34'	Stadium: Seoul World Cup Stadium; Attendance: 38,642; Referee: Subkhiddin Salleh (Malaysia)

12 October Friendly	South Korea	0–0	Japan	Seoul, South Korea
20:00		Report		Stadium: Seoul World Cup Stadium; Attendance: 62,503; Referee: Ravshan Irmatov (Uzbekistan)

30 December Friendly	South Korea	1–0	Syria	Abu Dhabi, United Arab Emirates
13:50	Ji Dong-won 83'	Report		Stadium: Baniyas Stadium; Attendance: 500; Referee: Facid Ali (United Arab Emirates)

=== 2011 ===
10 January 2011 AFC Asian Cup (Group C)	South Korea	2–1	Bahrain	Al Rayyan, Qatar
19:15 UTC+3	Koo Ja-cheol 40', 52'	Report	Aaish 85' (pen.)	Stadium: Thani bin Jassim Stadium; Attendance: 6,669; Referee: Abdullah Al Hilali (Oman)

14 January 2011 AFC Asian Cup (Group C)	South Korea	1–1	Australia	Al Rayyan, Qatar
16:15 UTC+3	Koo Ja-cheol 24'	Report	Jedinak 62'	Stadium: Thani bin Jassim Stadium; Attendance: 15,526; Referee: Abdulrahman Mohammed (Qatar)

18 January 2011 AFC Asian Cup (Group C)	South Korea	4–1	India	Al Rayyan, Qatar
16:15 UTC+3	Ji Dong-won 6', 23'; Koo Ja-cheol 9'; Son Heung-min 81'	Report	Chhetri 12' (pen.)	Stadium: Thani bin Jassim Stadium; Attendance: 11,366; Referee: Khalil Al Ghamdi (Saudi Arabia)

22 January 2011 AFC Asian Cup (Quarter-finals)	South Korea	1–0 (a.e.t.)	Iran	Doha, Qatar
19:25 UTC+3	Yoon Bit-garam 105+2'	Report		Stadium: Suheim bin Hamad Stadium; Attendance: 7,111; Referee: Ravshan Irmatov (Uzbekistan)

25 January 2011 AFC Asian Cup (Semi-finals)	South Korea	2–2 (a.e.t.) (0–3 p)	Japan	Al Rayyan, Qatar
16:25 UTC+3	Ki Sung-yueng 23' (pen.); Hwang Jae-won 120'	Report	Maeda 36'; Hosogai 97'	Stadium: Thani bin Jassim Stadium; Attendance: 16,171; Referee: Khalil Al Ghamdi (Saudi Arabia)
	Penalties
	Koo Ja-cheol (penalty missed); Lee Yong-rae (penalty missed); Hong Jeong-ho (penalty missed)		(penalty scored) Honda; (penalty scored) Okazaki; (penalty missed) Nagatomo; (penalty scored) Konno

28 January 2011 AFC Asian Cup (Third place match)	South Korea	3–2	Uzbekistan	Al Rayyan, Qatar
18:00 UTC+3	Koo Ja-cheol 18'; Ji Dong-won 28', 39'	Report	Geynrikh 45' (pen.), 53'	Stadium: Jassim bin Hamad Stadium; Attendance: 8,199; Referee: Abdul Malik Abdul Bashir (Singapore)

9 February Friendly	Turkey	0–0	South Korea	Trabzon, Turkey
20:00 UTC+2		Report		Stadium: Hüseyin Avni Aker Stadium; Referee: Sergii Boyko (Ukraine)

25 March Friendly	South Korea	4–0	Honduras	Seoul, South Korea
20:00 UTC+9	Lee Jung-soo 28'; Kim Jung-woo 43'; Park Chu-young 82'; Lee Keun-ho 90+2'	Report		Stadium: Seoul World Cup Stadium; Attendance: 31,224; Referee: Ryuji Sato (Japan)

3 June Friendly	South Korea	2–1	Serbia	Seoul, South Korea
20:00 UTC+9	Park Chu-young 10'; Kim Young-gwon 53'	Report	Petrović 87'	Stadium: Seoul World Cup Stadium; Attendance: 40,876; Referee: Ali Al-Badwawi (United Arab Emirates)

7 June Friendly	South Korea	2–1	Ghana	Jeonju, South Korea
20:00 UTC+9	Ji Dong-won 10'; Koo Ja-cheol 90'	Report	Gyan 62'	Stadium: Jeonju World Cup Stadium; Attendance: 41,271; Referee: Ravshan Irmatov (Uzbekistan)

10 August Friendly	Japan	3–0	South Korea	Sapporo, Japan
19:30 JST	Kagawa 35', 55'; Honda 53'	Report		Stadium: Sapporo Dome; Attendance: 38,263; Referee: Ravshan Irmatov (Uzbekistan)

2 September 2014 FIFA World Cup (Qualification)	South Korea	6–0	Lebanon	Goyang, South Korea
20:00 UTC+09:00	Park Chu-young 8', 45+1', 67'; Ji Dong-won 66', 85'; Kim Jung-woo 85'	Report		Stadium: Goyang Stadium; Attendance: 37,655; Referee: Abdul Malik Bashir (Singapore)

6 September 2014 FIFA World Cup (Qualification)	Kuwait	1–1	South Korea	Kuwait City, Kuwait
20:00 UTC+03:00	Fadel 53'	Report	Park Chu-young 8'	Stadium: Peace and Friendship Stadium; Attendance: 20,000; Referee: Mohsen Torky (Iran)

7 October Friendly	South Korea	2–2 (Note: The friendly match against Poland was not considered to be an official match organized by FIFA because South Korea used seven substitutes in the match. Under the FIFA regulations, a maximum of six substitutes may be used in an official national team match.)	Poland	Seoul, South Korea
20:00 UTC+9	Park Chu-young 65', 76'	Report	Lewandowski 29'; Błaszczykowski 82'	Stadium: Seoul World Cup Stadium; Attendance: 33,225; Referee: Nawaf Shukralla (Bahrain)

11 October 2014 FIFA World Cup (Qualification)	South Korea	2–1	United Arab Emirates	Suwon, South Korea
20:00 UTC+09:00	Park Chu-young 50'; Al Kamali 63' (o.g.)	Report	Matar 90+1'	Stadium: Suwon World Cup Stadium; Attendance: 28,689; Referee: Tan Hai (China)

11 November 2014 FIFA World Cup (Qualification)	United Arab Emirates	0–2	South Korea	Dubai, United Arab Emirates
16:45 UTC+4		Report	Lee Keun-ho 88'; Park Chu-young 90+3'	Stadium: Al-Rashid Stadium; Attendance: 8,272; Referee: Ravshan Irmatov (Uzbekistan)

15 November 2014 FIFA World Cup (Qualification)	Lebanon	2–1	South Korea	Beirut, Lebanon
14:30 UTC+2	Al Saadi 5'; Ali Atwi 31' (pen.)	Report	Koo Ja-cheol 21' (pen.)	Stadium: Camille Chamoun Sports City Stadium; Attendance: 35,000; Referee: Khalil Al Ghamdi (Saudi Arabia)

=== 2012 ===
25 February Friendly	South Korea	4–2	Uzbekistan	Jeonju, South Korea
14:00 UTC+9	Lee Dong-gook 19', 45'; Kim Chi-woo 46', 90+1'	Report	Rakhimov 78'; Andreev 83' (pen.)	Stadium: Jeonju World Cup Stadium; Attendance: 28,391; Referee: Chaiya Mahapab (Thailand)

29 February 2014 FIFA World Cup (Qualification)	South Korea	2–0	Kuwait	Seoul, South Korea
21:00 UTC+9	Lee Dong-gook 65'; Lee Keun-ho 71'	Report		Stadium: Seoul World Cup Stadium; Attendance: 46,551; Referee: Yuichi Nishimura (Japan)

30 May Friendly	South Korea	1–4	Spain	Bern, Switzerland
20:00	Kim Do-heon 43'	Report	Torres 11'; Alonso 53' (pen.); Cazorla 58'; Negredo 82'	Stadium: Stade de Suisse Wankdorf; Attendance: 10,220; Referee: Alain Bieri (Switzerland)

8 June 2014 FIFA World Cup (Qualification)	Qatar	1–4	South Korea	Al Rayyan, Qatar
19:15 UTC+3	Ahmed 22'	Report	Lee Keun-ho 26', 80'; Kwak Tae-hwi 55'; Kim Shin-wook 64'	Stadium: Jassim bin Hamad Stadium; Attendance: 10,730; Referee: Ali Al-Badawi (United Arab Emirates)

12 June 2014 FIFA World Cup (Qualification)	South Korea	3–0	Lebanon	Goyang, South Korea
20:00 UTC+9	Kim Bo-kyung 30', 48'; Koo Ja-cheol 90'	Report		Stadium: Goyang Stadium; Attendance: 36,756; Referee: Masaaki Toma (Japan)

15 August Friendly	South Korea	2–1	Zambia	Anyang, South Korea
20:00	Lee Keun-ho 15', 49'	Report	Mayuka 29'	Stadium: Anyang Stadium; Attendance: 16,606; Referee: Nawaf Abdullah (Bahrain)

11 September 2014 FIFA World Cup (Qualification)	Uzbekistan	2–2	South Korea	Tashkent, Uzbekistan
18:00	Ki Sung-yueng 13' (o.g.); Sanjar Tursunov 59'	Report	Artyom Filiposyan 44' (o.g.); Lee Dong-gook 55'	Stadium: Pakhtakor Markaziy Stadium; Attendance: 34.000; Referee: Benjamin Williams (Australia)

16 October 2014 FIFA World Cup (Qualification)	Iran	1–0	South Korea	Tehran, Iran
20:00	Nekounam 75'	Report		Stadium: Azadi Stadium; Attendance: 100,000; Referee: Abdul Maric (Singapore)

14 November Friendly	South Korea	1–2	Australia	Hwaseong, South Korea
19:00	Lee Dong-gook 11'	Report	Nikita Rukavytsya 43'; Robert Cornthwaite 87'	Stadium: Hwaseong Stadium; Attendance: 21,618; Referee: Wang Zhe (China}

=== 2013 ===
6 February Friendly	South Korea	0–4	Croatia	London, England
14:05		Report	Mandžukić 32'; Srna 40'; Jelavić 57'; Petrić 85'	Stadium: Craven Cottage; Attendance: 12,000; Referee: Michael Oliver (England)

26 March 2014 FIFA World Cup (Qualification)	South Korea	2–1	Qatar	Seoul, South Korea
20:00 UTC+9	Lee Keun-ho 60'; Son Heung-min 90+6'	Report	Ibrahim 63'	Stadium: Seoul World Cup Stadium; Attendance: 37,222; Referee: Yuichi Nishimura (Japan)

4 June 2014 FIFA World Cup (Qualification)	Lebanon	1–1	South Korea	Beirut, Lebanon
20:30 UTC+3	Maatouk 12'	Report	Kim Chi-woo 90+6'	Stadium: Camille Chamoun Sports City Stadium; Attendance: 8,430; Referee: Benjamin Williams (Australia)

11 June 2014 FIFA World Cup (Qualification)	South Korea	1–0	Uzbekistan	Seoul, South Korea
20:00 UTC+9	Shorakhmedov 42' (o.g.)	Report		Stadium: Seoul World Cup Stadium; Attendance: 50,699; Referee: Minoru Tōjō (Japan)

18 June 2014 FIFA World Cup (Qualification)	South Korea	0–1	Iran	Ulsan, South Korea
		Report	Ghoochannejhad 59'	Stadium: Ulsan Munsu Football Stadium; Attendance: 43,343; Referee: Tan Hai (China)

20 July 2013 EAFF Championship	South Korea	0–0	Australia	Seoul, South Korea
19:00 UTC+9		Report		Stadium: Seoul World Cup Stadium; Attendance: 31,571; Referee: Yuichi Nishimura (Japan)

24 July 2013 EAFF Championship	South Korea	0–0	China	Hwaseong, South Korea
20:00 UTC+9		Report		Stadium: Hwaseong Stadium; Attendance: 23,675; Referee: Valentin Kovalenko (Uzbekistan)

28 July 2013 EAFF Championship	South Korea	1–2	Japan	Seoul, South Korea
20:00 UTC+9	Yun Il-lok 33'	Report	Kakitani 24', 90+1'	Stadium: Jamsil Olympic Stadium; Attendance: 47,258; Referee: Ben Williams (Australia)

14 August Friendly	South Korea	0–0	Peru	Suwon, South Korea
20:00		Report		Stadium: Suwon World Cup Stadium; Attendance: 36,021; Referee: Abdul Malik Abdul Bashir (Singapore)

6 September Friendly	South Korea	4–1	Haiti	Incheon, South Korea
20:00 UTC+9	Son Heung-min 20', 72'; Koo Ja-cheol 49' (pen.); Lee Keun-ho 57' (pen.)	Report	Belfort 45'	Stadium: Incheon Football Stadium; Attendance: 13,264; Referee: Chaiya Mahapab (Thailand)

10 September Friendly	South Korea	1–2	Croatia	Jeonju, South Korea
20:00	Lee Keun-ho 90+4'	Report	Vida 64'; Kalinić 71'	Stadium: Jeonju World Cup Stadium; Attendance: 40,723; Referee: Minoru Tōjō (Japan)

12 October Friendly	South Korea	0–2	Brazil	Seoul, South Korea
20:00		Report	Neymar 44'; Oscar 49'	Stadium: Seoul World Cup Stadium; Attendance: 65,308; Referee: Ravshan Irmatov (Uzbekistan)

15 October Friendly	South Korea	3–1	Mali	Cheonan, South Korea
20:00 UTC+9	Koo Ja-cheol 36' (pen.); Son Heung-min 46'; Kim Bo-kyung 56'	Report	Maïga 27'	Stadium: Cheonan Stadium; Attendance: 26,118; Referee: Yuichi Nishimura (Japan)

15 November Friendly	South Korea	2–1	Switzerland	Seoul, South Korea
20:00	Hong Jeong-ho 59'; Lee Chung-yong 87'	Report	Kasami 7'	Stadium: Seoul World Cup Stadium; Attendance: 36,813; Referee: Diego Abal (Argentina)

19 November Friendly	South Korea	1–2	Russia	Dubai, United Arab Emirates
18:00	Kim Shin-wook 6'	Report	Smolov 12'; Tarasov 59'	Stadium: Zabeel Stadium; Attendance: 7,000; Referee: Hamad Al Shaikh (United Arab Emirates)

=== 2014 ===
25 January Friendly	South Korea	1–0	Costa Rica	Los Angeles, United States
15:00	Kim Shin-wook 9'	Report		Stadium: LA Memorial Coliseum; Attendance: 15,000; Referee: Baldomero Toledo (United States)

29 January Friendly	South Korea	0–4	Mexico	San Antonio, United States
20:00		Report	Peralta 37'; Pulido 45+1', 86', 89'	Stadium: Alamodome; Attendance: 54,313; Referee: Héctor Rodríguez (Honduras)

1 February Friendly	United States	2–0	South Korea	Carson, United States
14:00 PST	Wondolowski 4', 60'	Report		Stadium: StubHub Center; Attendance: 27,000; Referee: Hugo Cruz (Costa Rica)

5 March Friendly	Greece	0–2	South Korea	Athens, Greece
		Report	Park Chu-young 18'; Son Heung-min 55'	Stadium: Karaiskakis Stadium; Attendance: 7,600; Referee: Ovidiu Hațegan (Romania)

28 May Friendly	South Korea	0–1	Tunisia	Seoul, South Korea
20:00		Report	Dhaouadi 44'	Stadium: Seoul World Cup Stadium; Attendance: 57,112; Referee: Martin Atkinson (England)

9 June Friendly	South Korea	0–4	Ghana	Miami, United States
19:00 UTC−5		Report	J. Ayew 11', 53', 89'; Gyan 44'	Stadium: Sun Life Stadium; Attendance: 7,000; Referee: David Gantar (Canada)

17 June 2014 FIFA World Cup (Group H)	South Korea	1–1	Russia	Cuiabá, Brazil
18:00 UTC−4	Lee Keun-ho 68'	Report	Kerzhakov 74'	Stadium: Arena Pantanal; Attendance: 37,603; Referee: Néstor Pitana (Argentina)

22 June 2014 FIFA World Cup (Group H)	South Korea	2–4	Algeria	Porto Alegre, Brazil
16:00 UTC−3	Son Heung-min 50'; Koo Ja-cheol 72'	Report	Slimani 26'; Halliche 28'; Djabou 38'; Brahimi 62'	Stadium: Estádio Beira-Rio; Attendance: 42,732; Referee: Wilmar Roldán (Colombia)

26 June 2014 FIFA World Cup (Group H)	South Korea	0–1	Belgium	São Paulo, Brazil
17:00 UTC−3		Report	Vertonghen 78'	Stadium: Arena de São Paulo; Attendance: 61,397; Referee: Ben Williams (Australia)

5 September Friendly	South Korea	3–1	Venezuela	Bucheon, South Korea
20:00 UTC+9	Lee Myung-joo 33'; Lee Dong-gook 53', 64'	Report	M. Rondón 21'	Stadium: Bucheon Sports Complex; Attendance: 34,456; Referee: Võ Minh Trí (Vietnam)

8 September Friendly	South Korea	0–1	Uruguay	Goyang, South Korea
20:00 UTC+9		Report	Giménez 70'	Stadium: Goyang Sports Complex; Attendance: 38,183; Referee: Ryuji Sato (Japan)

10 October Friendly	South Korea	2–0	Paraguay	Cheonan, South Korea
20:00 UTC+9	Kim Min-woo 27'; Nam Tae-hee 32'	Report		Stadium: Cheonan Stadium; Attendance: 25,156; Referee: Valentin Kovalenko (Uzbekistan)

14 October Friendly	South Korea	1–3	Costa Rica	Seoul, South Korea
20:00 UTC+9	Lee Dong-gook 45+1'	Report	Borges 37', 47'; Duarte 78'	Stadium: Seoul World Cup Stadium; Attendance: 39,210; Referee: Alireza Faghani (Iran)

14 November Friendly	Jordan	0–1	South Korea	Amman, Jordan
16:30		Report	Han Kyo-won 34'	Stadium: Amman International Stadium; Attendance: 8,500; Referee: Abdelameer Abdelshaheed (Bahrain)

18 November Friendly	Iran	1–0	South Korea	Tehran, Iran
16:25	Azmoun 83'	Report		Stadium: Azadi Stadium; Attendance: 52,000; Referee: Valentin Kovalenko (Uzbekistan)

=== 2015 ===
4 January Friendly	South Korea	2–0 (Note: The friendly match against Saudi Arabia was not regarded as the official match organized by FIFA because FIFA received the pre-exhibition match document from the Australian Football Association late.)	Saudi Arabia	Sydney, Australia
20:00	Hawsawi 67' (o.g.); Lee Jeong-hyeop 90+2'	Report		Stadium: Parramatta Stadium; Attendance: 6,320; Referee: Jarred Gillett (Australia)

10 January 2015 AFC Asian Cup (Group A)	South Korea	1–0	Oman	Canberra, Australia
16:00 UTC+11	Cho Young-cheol 45+2'	Report		Stadium: Canberra Stadium; Attendance: 12,552; Referee: Peter O'Leary (New Zealand)

13 January 2015 AFC Asian Cup (Group A)	South Korea	1–0	Kuwait	Canberra, Australia
18:00 UTC+11	Nam Tae-hee 36'	Report		Stadium: Canberra Stadium; Attendance: 8,795; Referee: Alireza Faghani (Iran)

17 January 2015 AFC Asian Cup (Group A)	Australia	0–1	South Korea	Brisbane, Australia
19:00 UTC+11		Report	Lee Jeong-hyeop 33'	Stadium: Suncorp Stadium; Attendance: 48,513; Referee: Nawaf Shukralla (Bahrain)

22 January 2015 AFC Asian Cup (Quarter-finals)	South Korea	2–0 (a.e.t.)	Uzbekistan	Melbourne, Australia
18:30 UTC+11	Son Heung-min 104', 119'	Report		Stadium: Melbourne Rectangular Stadium; Attendance: 23,381; Referee: Fahad Al-Mirdasi (Saudi Arabia)

26 January 2015 AFC Asian Cup (Semi-finals)	South Korea	2–0	Iraq	Sydney, Australia
20:00 UTC+11	Lee Jeong-hyeop 20'; Kim Young-gwon 50'	Report		Stadium: Stadium Australia; Attendance: 36,053; Referee: Ryuji Sato (Japan)

31 January 2015 AFC Asian Cup (Final)	Australia	2–1 (a.e.t.)	South Korea	Sydney, Australia
20:00 UTC+11	Luongo 45'; Troisi 105'	Report	Son Heung-min 90+1'	Stadium: Stadium Australia; Attendance: 76,385; Referee: Alireza Faghani (Iran)

27 March Friendly	South Korea	1–1	Uzbekistan	Daejeon, South Korea
20:00	Koo Ja-cheol 15'	Report	Zokhir Kuziboyev 31'	Stadium: Daejeon World Cup Stadium; Attendance: 38,680; Referee: Ryuji Sato (Japan)

31 March Friendly	South Korea	1–0	New Zealand	Seoul, South Korea
20:00	Lee Jae-sung 86'	Report		Stadium: Seoul World Cup Stadium; Attendance: 33,514; Referee: Mohd Amirul Izwan Bin Yaacob (Malaysia)

11 June Friendly	South Korea	3–0	United Arab Emirates	Kuala Lumpur, Malaysia
20:00	Yeom Ki-hun 45'; Lee Yong-jae 60'; Lee Jeong-hyeop 90'	Report		Stadium: Shah Alam Stadium; Attendance: 1,080; Referee: Võ Minh Trí (Vietnam)

16 June 2018 FIFA World Cup (Qualification)	South Korea	2–0	Myanmar	Bangkok, Thailand
19:00	Lee Jae-sung 35'; Son Heung-min 67'	Report (FIFA); Report (AFC)		Stadium: Rajamangala Stadium; Attendance: 1,090; Referee: Ahmed Al-Kaf (Oman)

2 August 2015 EAFF Championship	China	0–2	South Korea	Wuhan, China
21:00 UTC+8		Report	Kim Seung-dae 45'; Lee Jong-ho 57'	Stadium: Wuhan Sports Center Stadium; Referee: Fahad Al-Mirdasi (Saudi Arabia)

5 August 2015 EAFF Championship	South Korea	1–1	Japan	Wuhan, China
18:20 UTC+8	Jang Hyun-soo 26' (pen.)	Report	Yamaguchi 39'	Stadium: Wuhan Sports Center Stadium; Referee: Muhammad Taqi Aljaafari (Singapore)

9 August 2015 EAFF Championship	South Korea	0–0	North Korea	Wuhan, China
17:10 UTC+8		Report		Stadium: Wuhan Sports Center Stadium; Referee: Alireza Faghani (Iran)

3 September 2018 FIFA World Cup (Qualification)	South Korea	8–0	Laos	Hwaseong, South Korea
20:00 UTC+9	Lee Chung-yong 9'; Son Heung-min 12', 74', 89'; Kwon Chang-hoon 30', 75'; Suk Hyun-jun 58'; Lee Jae-sung 90+4'	Report (FIFA); Report (AFC)		Stadium: Hwaseong Stadium; Attendance: 30,205; Referee: Jumpei Iida (Japan)

8 September 2018 FIFA World Cup (Qualification)	Lebanon	0–3	South Korea	Sidon, Lebanon
17:00 UTC+3		Report (FIFA); Report (AFC)	Jang Hyun-soo 22' (pen.); Ali Hamam 26' (o.g.); Kwon Chang-hoon 60'	Stadium: Saida Municipal Stadium; Attendance: 5,500; Referee: Dmitriy Mashentsev (Kyrgyzstan)

8 October 2018 FIFA World Cup (Qualification)	Kuwait	0–1	South Korea	Kuwait City, Kuwait
17:50 UTC+3		Report (FIFA); Report (AFC)	Koo Ja-cheol 12'	Stadium: Al Kuwait Sports Club Stadium; Attendance: 12,350; Referee: Alireza Faghani (Iran)

13 October Friendly	South Korea	3–0	Jamaica	Seoul, South Korea
20:00 UTC+9	Ji Dong-won 35'; Ki Sung-yueng 55' (pen.); Hwang Ui-jo 63'	Report		Stadium: Seoul World Cup Stadium; Attendance: 28,105; Referee: Ryuji Sato (Japan)

12 November 2018 FIFA World Cup (Qualification)	South Korea	4–0	Myanmar	Suwon, South Korea
20:00 UTC+9	Lee Jae-sung 18'; Koo Ja-cheol 30'; Jang Hyun-soo 82'; Nam Tae-hee 86'	Report (FIFA); Report (AFC)		Stadium: Suwon World Cup Stadium; Attendance: 24,270; Referee: Khamis Al-Marri (Qatar)

17 November 2018 FIFA World Cup (Qualification)	Laos	0–5	South Korea	Vientiane, Laos
19:00 UTC+7		Report (FIFA); Report (AFC)	Ki Sung-yueng 3' (pen.), 33'; Son Heung-min 35', 67'; Suk Hyun-jun 43'	Stadium: New Laos National Stadium; Attendance: 3,000; Referee: Turki Al-Khudhayr (Saudi Arabia)

=== 2016 ===
24 March 2018 FIFA World Cup (Qualification)	South Korea	1–0	Lebanon	Ansan, South Korea
20:00 KST	Lee Jeong-hyeop 90+3'	Report (FIFA); Report (AFC)		Stadium: Ansan Wa~ Stadium; Attendance: 30,532; Referee: Ma Ning (China)

27 March Friendly	Thailand	0–1	South Korea	Bangkok, Thailand
21:30 KST		Report	Suk Hyun-jun 4'	Stadium: Suphachalasai Stadium; Attendance: 20,000; Referee: Ng Chiu Kok (Hong Kong)

29 March 2018 FIFA World Cup (Qualification)	South Korea	3–0; Awarded	Kuwait	South Korea
00:00 KST		Report

1 June Friendly	South Korea	1–6	Spain	Salzburg, Austria
16:30 CEST	Ju Se-jong 83'	Report	Silva 30'; Fàbregas 32'; Nolito 38', 54'; Morata 50', 89'	Stadium: Red Bull Arena; Referee: Harald Lechner (Austria)

5 June Friendly	Czech Republic	1–2	South Korea	Prague, Czech Republic
15:10 CEST	Suchý 46'	Report	Yoon Bit-garam 26'; Suk Hyun-jun 40'	Stadium: Eden Arena; Attendance: 16,490; Referee: Daniel Stefanski (Poland)

1 September 2018 FIFA World Cup (Qualification)	South Korea	3–2	China	Seoul, South Korea
20:00 UTC+9	Zheng Zhi 20' (o.g.); Lee Chung-yong 62'; Koo Ja-cheol 66'	Report (FIFA)	Yu Hai 73'; Hao Junmin 76'	Stadium: Seoul World Cup Stadium; Attendance: 51,238; Referee: Mohammed Abdulla Hassan Mohamed (United Arab Emirates)

6 September 2018 FIFA World Cup (Qualification)	South Korea	0–0	Syria	Seremban, Malaysia
20:00 UTC+8		Report (FIFA)		Stadium: Tuanku Abdul Rahman Stadium; Attendance: 4,350; Referee: Chris Beath (Australia)

6 October 2018 FIFA World Cup (Qualification)	South Korea	3–2	Qatar	Suwon, South Korea
20:00 UTC+9	Ki Sung-yueng 11'; Ji Dong-won 56'; Son Heung-min 58'	Report (FIFA)	Al-Haidos 16' (pen.); Soria 45'	Stadium: Suwon World Cup Stadium; Attendance: 32,550; Referee: Mohd Amirul Izwan Yaacob (Malaysia)

11 October 2018 FIFA World Cup (Qualification)	Iran	1–0	South Korea	Tehran, Iran
18:15 UTC+3:30	Azmoun 25'	Report (FIFA)		Stadium: Azadi Stadium; Attendance: 75,800; Referee: Ryuji Sato (Japan)

11 November Friendly	South Korea	2–0	Canada	Cheonan, South Korea
20:00 UTC+9	Kim Bo-kyung 10'; Lee Jeong-hyeop 25'	Report		Stadium: Cheonan Stadium; Attendance: 18,920; Referee: Ma Ning (China)

15 November 2018 FIFA World Cup (Qualification)	South Korea	2–1	Uzbekistan	Seoul, South Korea
20:00 UTC+9	Nam Tae-hee 67'; Koo Ja-cheol 85'	Report (FIFA)	Bikmaev 25'	Stadium: Seoul World Cup Stadium; Attendance: 30,526; Referee: Fahad Al-Mirdasi (Saudi Arabia)

=== 2017 ===
23 March 2018 FIFA World Cup (Qualification)	China	1–0	South Korea	Changsha, China
19:35 UTC+8	Yu Dabao 34'	Report		Stadium: Helong Stadium; Attendance: 30,950; Referee: Peter Green (Australia)

28 March 2018 FIFA World Cup (Qualification)	South Korea	1–0	Syria	Seoul, South Korea
20:00 UTC+9	Hong Jeong-ho 4'	Report		Stadium: Seoul World Cup Stadium; Attendance: 30,352; Referee: Adham Makhadmeh (Jordan)

7 June Friendly	South Korea	0–0	Iraq	Ras Al Khaimah, United Arab Emirates
21:00 UTC+4		Report		Stadium: Emirates Club Stadium; Attendance: 1,000; Referee: Yaqoub Al Hammadi (United Arab Emirates)

13 June 2018 FIFA World Cup (Qualification)	Qatar	3–2	South Korea	Al Rayyan, Qatar
22:00 UTC+3	Al-Haidos 25', 75'; Afif 51'	Report	Ki Sung-yueng 62'; Hwang Hee-chan 70'	Stadium: Jassim bin Hamad Stadium; Attendance: 5,373; Referee: Hettikamkanamge Perera (Sri Lanka)

31 August 2018 FIFA World Cup (Qualification)	South Korea	0–0	Iran	Seoul, South Korea
21:00 UTC+9		Report		Stadium: Seoul World Cup Stadium; Attendance: 63,124; Referee: Peter Green (Australia)

5 September 2018 FIFA World Cup (Qualification)	Uzbekistan	0–0	South Korea	Tashkent, Uzbekistan
20:00 UTC+5		Report		Stadium: Bunyodkor Stadium; Attendance: 34,000; Referee: Muhammad Taqi (Singapore)

7 October Friendly	Russia	4–2	South Korea	Moscow, Russia
17:00 UTC+3	Smolov 44'; Kim Ju-young 55', 57' (o.g.); Miranchuk 83'	Report	Kwon Kyung-won 87'; Ji Dong-won 90+3'	Stadium: VEB Arena; Attendance: 24,200; Referee: Viktor Kassai (Hungary)

10 October Friendly	South Korea	1–3	Morocco	Biel/Bienne, Switzerland
15:30 UTC+2	Son Heung-min 66' (pen.)	Report	Tannane 7', 11'; Haddad 46'	Stadium: Tissot Arena; Attendance: 2,000; Referee: Alain Bieri (Switzerland)

10 November Friendly	South Korea	2–1	Colombia	Suwon, South Korea
20:00 UTC+9	Son Heung-min 11', 61'	Report	Zapata 76'	Stadium: Suwon World Cup Stadium; Attendance: 29,750; Referee: Chris Beath (Australia)

14 November Friendly	South Korea	1–1	Serbia	Ulsan, South Korea
20:00 UTC+9	Koo Ja-cheol 62' (pen.)	Report	Ljajić 59'	Stadium: Ulsan Munsu Football Stadium; Attendance: 30,560; Referee: Ma Ning (China)

9 December 2017 EAFF Championship	South Korea	2–2	China	Chōfu, Japan
16:30 UTC+9	Kim Shin-wook 12'; Lee Jae-sung 19'	Report	Wei Shihao 9'; Yu Dabao 76'	Stadium: Ajinomoto Stadium; Attendance: 9,103; Referee: Khamis Al-Marri (Qatar)

12 December 2017 EAFF Championship	South Korea	1–0	North Korea	Chōfu, Japan
16:30 UTC+9	Ri Yong-chol 64' (o.g.)	Report		Stadium: Ajinomoto Stadium; Attendance: 5,477; Referee: Hettikamkanamge Perera (Sri Lanka)

16 December 2017 EAFF Championship	Japan	1–4	South Korea	Chōfu, Japan
19:15 UTC+9	Yu Kobayashi 3' (pen.)	Report	Kim Shin-wook 13', 35'; Jung Woo-young 23'; Yeom Ki-hun 69'	Stadium: Ajinomoto Stadium; Attendance: 36,645; Referee: Chris Beath (Australia)

=== 2018 ===
27 January Friendly	South Korea	1–0	Moldova	Antalya, Turkey
16:00 UTC+3	Kim Shin-wook 67'	Report	Ambros (yellow card) 78'	Stadium: Mardan Stadium; Attendance: 1,000; Referee: Alper Ulusoy (Turkey)

30 January Friendly	South Korea	2–2	Jamaica	Antalya, Turkey
14:00 UTC+3	Kim Shin-wook 55', 63'; Kim Jin-su (yellow card) 79'	Report	Kelly 4' (yellow card) 40'; Francis (yellow card) 49'; Foster 72'	Stadium: Mardan Stadium; Attendance: 100; Referee: Alper Ulusoy (Turkey)

3 February Friendly	South Korea	1–0	Latvia	Antalya, Turkey
17:30 UTC+3	Kim Shin-wook 33'	Report		Stadium: Mardan Stadium; Attendance: 100; Referee: Ali Palabıyık (Turkey)

24 March Friendly	Northern Ireland	2–1	South Korea	Belfast, Northern Ireland
14:00 UTC+0	Kim Min-jae 20' (o.g.); Smyth 86'	Report	Kwon Chang-hoon 7'	Stadium: Windsor Park; Attendance: 18,103; Referee: Bobby Madden (Scotland)

27 March Friendly	Poland	3–2	South Korea	Chorzów, Poland
20:45 UTC+2	Lewandowski 32'; Grosicki 45'; Rybus (yellow card) 62'; Zieliński 90+2'	Report	Choi Chul-soon (yellow card) 76'; Lee Chang-min 85'; Hwang Hee-chan 87'	Stadium: Silesian Stadium; Attendance: 53,129; Referee: Tore Hansen (Norway)

28 May Friendly	South Korea	2–0	Honduras	Daegu, South Korea
20:00 UTC+9	Son Heung-min 60'; Moon Seon-min 72'	Report	Claros (yellow card) 25'; Castillo (yellow card) 90+2'	Stadium: Daegu Stadium; Attendance: 33,252; Referee: Hiroyuki Kimura (Japan)

1 June Friendly	South Korea	1–3	Bosnia and Herzegovina	Jeonju, South Korea
20:00 UTC+9	Lee Jae-sung 30'; Jung Woo-young (yellow card) 56'	Report	Šunjić (yellow card) 17'; Višća 28', 45+1', 79'; Sarić (yellow card) 58'	Stadium: Jeonju World Cup Stadium; Attendance: 41,254; Referee: Peter Green (Australia)

7 June Friendly	South Korea	0–0	Bolivia	Innsbruck, Austria
14:10 UTC+2		Report		Stadium: Tivoli-Neu; Attendance: 500; Referee: Robert Schörgenhofer (Austria)

11 June Friendly	South Korea	0–2	Senegal	Grödig, Austria
15:30 UTC+2		Report	Sabaly (yellow card); Kouyaté (yellow card); Niang (yellow card); Kim Shin-wook 55' (o.g.); Konaté 86' (pen.)	Stadium: Untersberg-Arena; Referee: Harald Lechner (Austria)

18 June 2018 FIFA World Cup (Group F)	South Korea	0–1	Sweden	Nizhny Novgorod, Russia
15:00 UTC+3	Kim Shin-wook (yellow card) 13'; Hwang Hee-chan (yellow card) 55'	Report	Claesson (yellow card) 61'; Granqvist 65' (pen.)	Stadium: Nizhny Novgorod Stadium; Attendance: 42,300; Referee: Joel Aguilar (El Salvador)

23 June 2018 FIFA World Cup (Group F)	South Korea	1–2	Mexico	Rostov-on-Don, Russia
18:00 UTC+3	Kim Young-gwon (yellow card) 58'; Lee Yong (yellow card) 63'; Lee Seung-woo (yellow card) 72'; Jung Woo-young (yellow card) 80'; Son Heung-min 90+3'	Report	Vela 26' (pen.); Hernández 66'	Stadium: Rostov Arena; Attendance: 43,472; Referee: Milorad Mažić (Serbia)

27 June 2018 FIFA World Cup (Group F)	South Korea	2–0	Germany	Kazan, Russia
17:00 UTC+3	Jung Woo-young (yellow card) 9'; Lee Jae-sung (yellow card) 23'; Moon Seon-min (yellow card) 48'; Kim Young-gwon 90+3'; Son Heung-min (yellow card) 65' (goal) 90+6'	Report		Stadium: Kazan Arena; Attendance: 41,835; Referee: Mark Geiger (United States)

7 September Friendly	South Korea	2–0	Costa Rica	Goyang, South Korea
20:00 UTC+9	Lee Jae-sung 35'; Nam Tae-hee 78'	Report	Gamboa (yellow card) 34'; Guzmán (yellow card) 35'	Stadium: Goyang Stadium; Attendance: 36,127; Referee: Ma Ning (China)

11 September Friendly	South Korea	0–0	Chile	Suwon, South Korea
20:00 UTC+9	Kim Young-gwon (yellow card) 41'; Hwang In-beom (yellow card) 90+1'	Report	Medel (yellow card) 13'	Stadium: Suwon World Cup Stadium; Attendance: 40,127; Referee: Ryuji Sato (Japan)

12 October Friendly	South Korea	2–1	Uruguay	Seoul, South Korea
20:00 UTC+9	Hwang Ui-jo 66'; Jung Woo-young 79'	Report	Nández (yellow card) 27'; Muslera (yellow card) 65'; Vecino 72'; Bentancur (yellow card) 75'	Stadium: Seoul World Cup Stadium; Attendance: 64,170; Referee: Alireza Faghani (Iran)

16 October Friendly	South Korea	2–2	Panama	Cheonan, South Korea
20:00 UTC+9	Park Joo-ho 6'; Hwang In-beom 33' (yellow card) 51'; Kim Young-gwon (yellow card) 88'	Report	Arroyo 45'; Blackburn 49'	Stadium: Cheonan Stadium; Attendance: 25,556; Referee: Alireza Faghani (Iran)

17 November Friendly	Australia	1–1	South Korea	Brisbane, Australia
18:50 UTC+10	Milligan (yellow card) 88'; Boyle (yellow card) 89'; Luongo 90+4'	Report	Hwang Ui-jo 22'; Hong Chul (yellow card) 38'	Stadium: Suncorp Stadium; Attendance: 32,922; Referee: Jumpei Iida (Japan)

20 November Friendly	South Korea	4–0	Uzbekistan	Brisbane, Australia
20:00 UTC+10	Nam Tae-hee 9'; Hwang Ui-jo 24'; Moon Seon-min 70'; Suk Hyun-jun 82'	Report		Stadium: QSAC; Attendance: 1,705; Referee: Chris Beath (Australia)

31 December Friendly	South Korea	0–0	Saudi Arabia	Abu Dhabi, United Arab Emirates
20:00 UTC+4		Report	Al-Owais (yellow card) 82'	Stadium: Baniyas Stadium; Attendance: 300; Referee: Adel Al Naqbi (United Arab Emirates)

=== 2019 ===
7 January 2019 AFC Asian Cup (Group C)	South Korea	1–0	Philippines	Dubai, United Arab Emirates
17:30 UTC+4	Hwang Ui-jo 67'	Report		Stadium: Al-Maktoum Stadium; Attendance: 3,185; Referee: Nawaf Shukralla (Bahrain)

11 January 2019 AFC Asian Cup (Group C)	South Korea	1–0	Kyrgyzstan	Al Ain, United Arab Emirates
20:00 UTC+4	Kim Min-jae 41'	Report		Stadium: Hazza bin Zayed Stadium; Attendance: 4,893; Referee: Khamis Al-Marri (Qatar)

16 January 2019 AFC Asian Cup (Group C)	South Korea	2–0	China	Abu Dhabi, United Arab Emirates
17:30 UTC+4	Hwang Ui-jo 14' (pen.); Kim Min-jae 51'	Report		Stadium: Al Nahyan Stadium; Attendance: 13,579; Referee: Abdulrahman Al-Jassim (Qatar)

22 January 2019 AFC Asian Cup (Round of 16)	South Korea	2–1 (a.e.t.)	Bahrain	Dubai, United Arab Emirates
17:00 UTC+4	Hwang Hee-chan 43'; Kim Jin-su 105+2'	Report	Al Romaihi 77'	Stadium: Rashid Stadium; Attendance: 7,658; Referee: Ryuji Sato (Japan)

25 January 2019 AFC Asian Cup (Quarter-finals)	South Korea	0–1	Qatar	Abu Dhabi, United Arab Emirates
17:00 UTC+4		Report	Hatem 78'	Stadium: Zayed Sports City Stadium; Attendance: 13,791; Referee: Ravshan Irmatov (Uzbekistan)

22 March Friendly	South Korea	1–0	Bolivia	Ulsan, South Korea
20:00 UTC+9	Lee Chung-yong 86'	Report		Stadium: Ulsan Munsu Football Stadium; Attendance: 41,117; Referee: Khamis Al-Marri (Qatar)

26 March Friendly	South Korea	2–1	Colombia	Seoul, South Korea
20:00 UTC+9	Son Heung-min 16'; Lee Jae-sung 58'	Report	Díaz 48'	Stadium: Seoul World Cup Stadium; Attendance: 64,388; Referee: Abdulrahman Al-Jassim (Qatar)

7 June Friendly	South Korea	1–0	Australia	Busan, South Korea
20:00 UTC+9	Hwang Ui-jo 76'	Report		Stadium: Busan Asiad Main Stadium; Attendance: 52,213; Referee: Minoru Tōjō (Japan)

11 June Friendly	South Korea	1–1	Iran	Seoul, South Korea
20:00 UTC+9	Hwang Ui-jo 57'	Report	Kim Young-gwon 62' (o.g.)	Stadium: Seoul World Cup Stadium; Attendance: 60,213; Referee: Ryuji Sato (Japan)

5 September Friendly	South Korea	2–2	Georgia	Istanbul, Turkey
16:30 UTC+3	Hwang Ui-jo 48', 85'	Report	Ananidze 40'; Kvilitaia 90'	Stadium: Başakşehir Fatih Terim Stadium; Attendance: 750; Referee: Hüseyin Göçek (Turkey)

10 September 2022 FIFA World Cup (Qualification)	Turkmenistan	0–2	South Korea	Ashgabat, Turkmenistan
19:00 UTC+5		Report	Na Sang-ho 13'; Jung Woo-young 82'	Stadium: Köpetdag Stadium; Attendance: 26,000; Referee: Ammar Al-Jeneibi (United Arab Emirates); MVP: Na Sang-ho (South Korea)

10 October 2022 FIFA World Cup (Qualification)	South Korea	8–0	Sri Lanka	Hwaseong, South Korea
20:00 UTC+9	Son Heung-min 10', 45+5' (pen.); Kim Shin-wook 17', 30', 54', 64'; Hwang Hee-chan 20'; Kwon Chang-hoon 76'	Report		Stadium: Hwaseong Stadium; Attendance: 23,522; Referee: Hasan Akrami (Iran); MVP: Kim Shin-wook (South Korea)

15 October 2022 FIFA World Cup (Qualification)	North Korea	0–0	South Korea	Pyongyang, North Korea
17:30 UTC+9		Report		Stadium: Kim Il-sung Stadium; Attendance: 100; Referee: Abdulrahman Al-Jassim (Qatar); MVP: An Tae-song (North Korea)

14 November 2022 FIFA World Cup (Qualification)	Lebanon	0–0	South Korea	Beirut, Lebanon
15:00 UTC+2		Report		Stadium: Camille Chamoun Sports City Stadium; Attendance: 170; Referee: Mohanad Qasim (Iraq); MVP: Bassel Jradi (Lebanon)

19 November Friendly	South Korea	0–3	Brazil	Abu Dhabi, United Arab Emirates
17:30 UTC+4		Report	Paquetá 9'; Coutinho 36'; Danilo 60'	Stadium: Mohammed bin Zayed Stadium; Attendance: 9,000; Referee: Ammar Al-Jeneibi (United Arab Emirates)

11 December 2019 EAFF Championship	South Korea	2–0	Hong Kong	Busan, South Korea
19:30 UTC+9	Hwang In-beom 45+1'; Na Sang-ho 82'	Report		Stadium: Busan Asiad Main Stadium; Attendance: 1,070; Referee: Shaun Evans (Australia)

15 December 2019 EAFF Championship	South Korea	1–0	China	Busan, South Korea
19:30 UTC+9	Kim Min-jae 13'	Report		Stadium: Busan Asiad Main Stadium; Attendance: 7,916; Referee: Muhammad Taqi (Singapore)

18 December 2019 EAFF Championship	South Korea	1–0	Japan	Busan, South Korea
19:30 UTC+9	Hwang In-beom 28'	Report		Stadium: Busan Asiad Main Stadium; Attendance: 29,252; Referee: Ilgiz Tantashev (Uzbekistan)

== Head-to-head records ==
South Korea national football team head-to-head records (2010–2019)
Opponent	Pld	W	D	L	GF	GA	GD	Pts	Confederation
Algeria	1	0	0	1	2	4	–2	0	CAF
Argentina	1	0	0	1	1	4	–3	0	CONMEBOL
Australia	7	3	3	1	7	5	+2	12	AFC
Bahrain	2	2	0	0	4	2	+2	6	AFC
Belarus	1	0	0	1	0	1	–1	0	UEFA
Belgium	1	0	0	1	0	1	–1	0	UEFA
Bolivia	2	1	1	0	1	0	+1	4	CONMEBOL
Bosnia and Herzegovina	1	0	0	1	1	3	–2	0	UEFA
Brazil	2	0	0	2	0	5	–5	0	CONMEBOL
Canada	1	1	0	0	2	0	+2	3	CONCACAF
Chile	1	0	1	0	0	0	0	1	CONMEBOL
China	6	3	2	1	8	6	+2	11	AFC
Colombia	2	2	0	0	4	2	+2	6	CONMEBOL
Costa Rica	3	2	0	1	5	3	+2	6	CONCACAF
Croatia	2	0	0	2	1	6	–5	0	UEFA
Czech Republic	1	1	0	0	2	1	+1	3	UEFA
Ecuador	1	1	0	0	2	0	+2	3	CONMEBOL
Finland	1	1	0	0	2	0	+2	3	UEFA
Georgia	1	0	1	0	2	2	0	1	UEFA
Germany	1	1	0	0	2	0	+2	3	UEFA
Ghana	2	1	0	1	2	5	–3	3	CAF
Greece	2	2	0	0	4	0	+4	6	UEFA
Haiti	1	1	0	0	4	1	+3	3	CONCACAF
Honduras	2	2	0	0	6	0	+6	6	CONCACAF
Hong Kong	2	2	0	0	7	0	+7	6	AFC
Iran	6	0	2	4	2	5	–3	2	AFC
Iraq	2	1	1	0	2	0	+2	4	AFC
Jamaica	2	1	1	0	5	2	+3	4	CONCACAF
Japan	9	4	3	2	14	10	+4	15	AFC
Jordan	2	1	0	1	1	1	0	3	AFC
Kuwait	3	2	1	0	4	1	+3	7	AFC
Kyrgyzstan	1	1	0	0	1	0	+1	3	AFC
Laos	2	2	0	0	13	0	+13	6	AFC
Latvia	2	2	0	0	2	0	+2	6	UEFA
Lebanon	6	4	2	0	10	2	+8	14	AFC
Mali	1	1	0	0	3	1	+2	3	CAF
Mexico	2	0	0	2	1	6	–5	0	CONCACAF
Moldova	1	1	0	0	1	0	+1	3	UEFA
Morocco	1	0	0	1	1	3	–2	0	CAF
Myanmar	2	2	0	0	6	0	+6	6	AFC
New Zealand	1	1	0	0	1	0	+1	3	OFC
Nigeria	2	1	1	0	4	3	+1	4	CAF
North Korea	3	1	2	0	1	0	+1	5	AFC
Northern Ireland	1	0	0	1	1	2	–1	0	UEFA
Oman	1	1	0	0	1	0	+1	3	AFC
Panama	1	0	1	0	2	2	0	1	CONCACAF
Paraguay	1	1	0	0	2	0	+2	3	CONMEBOL
Peru	1	0	1	0	0	0	0	1	CONMEBOL
Philippines	1	1	0	0	1	0	+1	3	AFC
Poland	1	0	0	1	2	3	–1	0	UEFA
Qatar	5	2	0	3	8	7	+1	6	AFC
Russia	2	0	1	1	2	3	–1	1	UEFA
Saudi Arabia	1	0	1	0	0	0	0	1	AFC
Senegal	1	0	0	1	0	2	–2	0	CAF
Serbia	2	1	1	0	3	2	+1	4	UEFA
Spain	2	0	0	2	1	5	–4	0	UEFA
Sri Lanka	1	1	0	0	8	0	+8	3	AFC
Sweden	1	0	0	1	0	1	–1	0	UEFA
Switzerland	1	1	0	0	2	1	+1	3	UEFA
Syria	2	1	1	0	1	0	+1	4	AFC
Tunisia	1	0	0	1	0	1	–1	0	CAF
Turkmenistan	1	1	0	0	2	0	+2	3	AFC
United Arab Emirates	3	3	0	0	7	1	+6	9	AFC
Uruguay	3	1	0	2	3	4	–1	3	CONMEBOL
Uzbekistan	8	5	3	0	15	6	+9	18	AFC
Venezuela	1	1	0	0	3	1	+2	3	CONMEBOL
Zambia	1	1	0	0	4	2	+2	3	CAF
Total	152	77	33	42	222	143	+79	264	

== See also ==
- South Korea national football team results
- South Korea national football team
