= Kim Young-gwon =

South Korean footballer (born 1990)

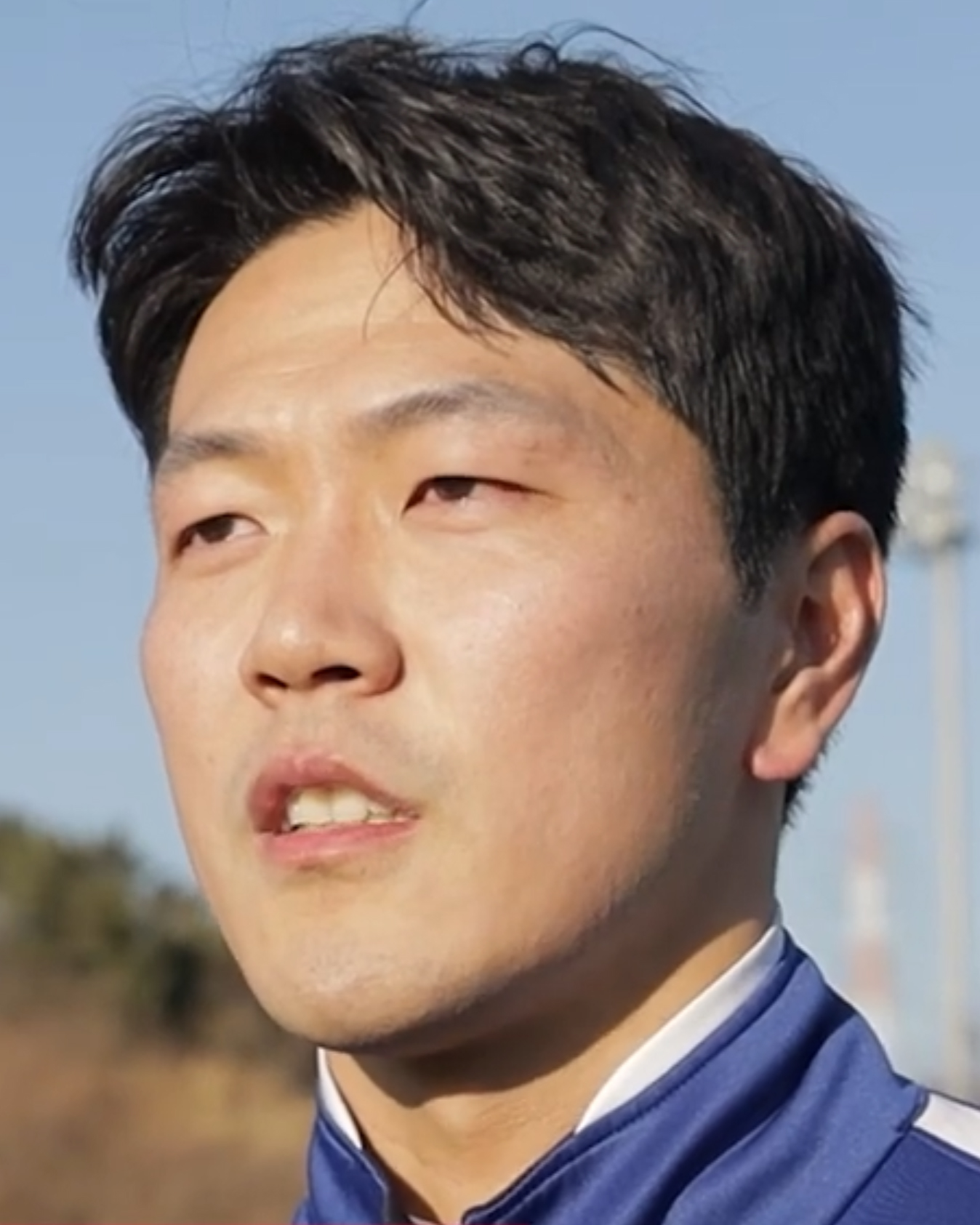
- Kim in 2022

Personal information
- Full name: Kim Young-gwon
- Date of birth: 27 February 1990 (age 36)
- Place of birth: Jeonju, South Korea
- Height: 1.86 m (6 ft 1 in)
- Position: Centre-back

Team information
- Current team: Ulsan HD
- Number: 19

Youth career
- 2005–2008: Jeonju Technical High School

College career
Years	Team	Apps	(Gls)
2008–2010	Jeonju University		

Senior career*
Years	Team	Apps	(Gls)
2010	FC Tokyo	23	(0)
2011–2012	Omiya Ardija	40	(0)
2012–2018	Guangzhou Evergrande	91	(3)
2019–2021	Gamba Osaka	76	(1)
2022–	Ulsan HD	139	(3)

International career^{‡}
2008–2009	South Korea U20	20	(2)
2009–2012	South Korea U23	23	(0)
2009	South Korea Universiade	6	(0)
2009	South Korea (futsal)		
2010–	South Korea	112	(7)
Medal record
Representing South Korea
Men's football
Olympic Games
Bronze medal – third place	2012 London
AFC Asian Cup
Runner-up	2015 Australia
Asian Games
Bronze medal – third place	2010 Guangzhou
EAFF Championship
Winner	2015 China
Winner	2019 South Korea
Bronze medal – third place	2013 South Korea
- * Club domestic league appearances and goals as of 3 August 2026 ‡ National team caps and goals as of 5 September 2024

- Kim Young-gwon
- Hangul: 김영권
- Hanja: 金英權
- RR: Gim Yeonggwon
- MR: Kim Yŏnggwŏn
- IPA: [kimjʌŋɡwʌn]

Kim Young-gwon (Korean: 김영권; born 27 February 1990) is a South Korean professional footballer who plays for Ulsan HD and the South Korea national team.

== Early life ==
Kim is a native of Jeonju. When he was in middle school, he was not a highly regarded prospect as coaches viewed his slight frame as a disadvantage. Kim began considering becoming a professional footballer when national youth team manager Hong Myung-bo visited Kim's high school to speak to his team.

Kim played college football and futsal for Jeonju University. In 2009, he participated in the Futsal League of the Korea Football Association, and became the champion and the top scorer. His futsal career was a big help to his techniques.

== Club career ==
In 2010, Kim joined J1 League side FC Tokyo, starting his professional career. He scored his first senior goal with a direct free kick in the 2010 J.League Cup against Kyoto Sanga FC. After his first season, Kim transferred to Omiya Ardija, because FC Tokyo was relegated to the second tier by finishing 16th in the league.

In July 2012, Kim transferred to Chinese Super League side Guangzhou Evergrande. He contributed to the best period of Guangzhou Evergrande, showing foreign player's worth. Guangzhou Evergrande won all of the four league titles in addition to two AFC Champions Leagues during the initial four years with Kim from 2013 to 2016, and Kim was also selected for the Team of the Year every year. However, he lost his influence in Guangzhou due to his injury and the removal of Asian quota in the CSL since 2017.

== International career ==
Kim's first international tournament was the Universiade. He played the 2009 Summer Universiade for South Korean Universiade team.

In the 2009 FIFA U-20 World Cup, Kim was the regular center defender of South Korean under-20 team, and scored a goal during the last group match against the United States, which resulted South Korea's advancing to the knockout stage.

Kim also played the 2009 Asian Indoor Games for the South Korea national futsal team.

Kim won the bronze medal with South Korean under-23 team in the 2010 Asian Games. Afterwards, he was named in the primary list for the 2011 AFC Asian Cup, but he wasn't selected for the final squad.

In the 2012 Summer Olympics, South Korean Olympic football team finished third, winning its first-ever Olympic football medal. Kim was regarded as a notable player among the bronze medalists.

Kim was a member of South Korea's squad for the 2014 FIFA World Cup and started in all of the team's group matches. South Korea drew with Russia, and lost to Algeria and Belgium in the group stage. His defense wasn't good this time, especially against Algerian players.

At the 2015 AFC Asian Cup, Kim scored the second goal in South Korea's 2–0 semi-final defeat of Iraq on 26 January 2015, putting the nation into the Asian Cup final for the first time since 1988. However, South Korea failed to bring the trophy after losing the final to Australia.

Kim was named in South Korea's squad for the 2018 FIFA World Cup in Russia. He showed outstanding plays unlike four years ago, becoming a great leader of South Korean defenders. Furthermore, in the final group match against Germany, he scored in the 91st minute to knock out the defending world champions, coupled with a second goal minutes later by Son Heung-min.

In the 2022 FIFA World Cup, Kim scored a goal in South Korea's crucial match against Portugal to level the score 1–1, followed by Hwang Hee-chan's goal in stoppage time, which promoted South Korea to the round of 16. In the round of 16, Kim played his 100th cap for the national team against Brazil, with Korea went on to lose 4–1.

== Personal life ==
In 2014 Kim married Park Se-jin. They have three children, a daughter and two sons. Kim has made guest appearances with his two older children in several episodes of The Return of Superman.

== Career statistics ==
=== Club ===
As of 30 August 2025

Appearances and goals by club, season and competition
Club	Season	League			National Cup		League Cup		Continental		Others		Total	
Club	Season	Division	Apps	Goals	Apps	Goals	Apps	Goals	Apps	Goals	Apps	Goals	Apps	Goals
FC Tokyo	2010	J1 League	23	0	2	0	6	1	—		—		31	1
Omiya Ardija	2011	J1 League	27	0	0	0	2	1	—		—		29	1
Omiya Ardija	2012	J1 League	13	0	0	0	3	1	—		—		16	1
Omiya Ardija	Total		40	0	0	0	5	2	—		—		45	2
Guangzhou Evergrande	2012	Chinese Super League	7	0	4	0	—		2 (Note: Appearances in AFC Champions League (Elite))	0	—		13	0
Guangzhou Evergrande	2013	Chinese Super League	26	2	4	0	—		14	0	4 (Note: One appearance in Chinese FA Super Cup, three appearances in FIFA Club World Cup)	0	48	2
Guangzhou Evergrande	2014	Chinese Super League	16	1	0	0	—		9	0	0	0	25	1
Guangzhou Evergrande	2015	Chinese Super League	18	0	0	0	—		11	0	3 (Note: Appearances in FIFA Club World Cup)	0	32	0
Guangzhou Evergrande	2016	Chinese Super League	15	0	2	0	—		4	0	1 (Note: Appearance in Chinese FA Super Cup)	0	22	0
Guangzhou Evergrande	2017	Chinese Super League	4	0	5	0	—		2	0	0	0	11	0
Guangzhou Evergrande	2018	Chinese Super League	5	0	0	0	—		8	0	0	0	13	0
Guangzhou Evergrande	Total		91	3	15	0	—		50	0	8	0	164	3
Gamba Osaka	2019	J1 League	32	1	1	0	3	0	—		—		36	1
Gamba Osaka	2020	J1 League	28	0	2	0	1	0	—		—		31	0
Gamba Osaka	2021	J1 League	16	0	0	0	0	0	4	0	—		20	0
Gamba Osaka	Total		76	1	3	0	4	0	4	0	—		87	1
Ulsan HD	2022	K League 1	36	0	0	0	—		5	0	—		41	0
Ulsan HD	2023	K League 1	32	1	1	0	—		5	0	—		38	1
Ulsan HD	2024	K League 1	21	2	3	0	—		10	0	—		34	2
Ulsan HD	2025	K League 1	27	0	2	0	—		0	0	3	0	32	0
Ulsan HD	Total		116	3	6	0	0	0	20	0	3	0	145	3
Career total			346	7	26	0	15	3	74	0	11	0	472	10

=== International ===
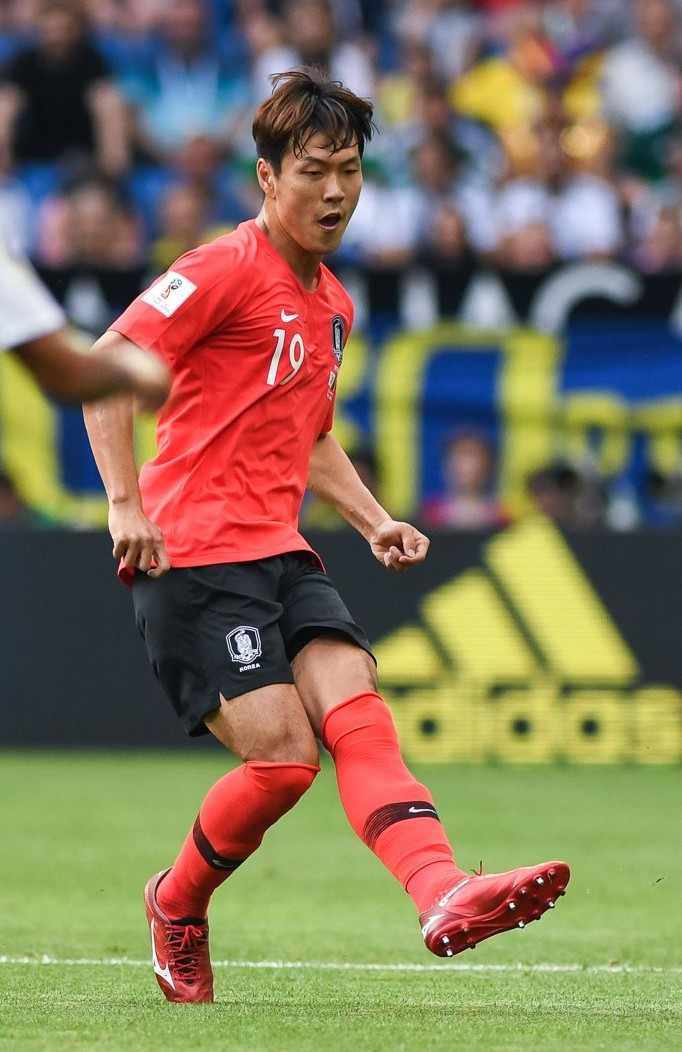
Kim playing for South Korea at the 2018 FIFA World Cup

As of match played 5 September 2024

Appearances and goals by national team and year
National team	Year	Apps	Goals
South Korea	2010	2	0
South Korea	2011	5	1
South Korea	2012	1	0
South Korea	2013	10	0
South Korea	2014	11	0
South Korea	2015	14	1
South Korea	2016	2	0
South Korea	2017	4	0
South Korea	2018	14	1
South Korea	2019	15	0
South Korea	2021	7	1
South Korea	2022	15	3
South Korea	2023	3	0
South Korea	2024	9	0
Career total		112	7

List of international goals scored by Kim Young-gwon
No.	Date	Venue	Cap	Opponent	Score	Result	Competition
1	3 June 2011	Seoul World Cup Stadium, Seoul, South Korea	4	Serbia	2–0	2–1	Friendly
2	26 January 2015	Stadium Australia, Sydney, Australia	33	Iraq	2–0	2–0	2015 AFC Asian Cup
3	27 June 2018	Kazan Arena, Kazan, Russia	56	Germany	1–0	2–0	2018 FIFA World Cup
4	5 June 2021	Goyang Stadium, Goyang, South Korea	80	Turkmenistan	3–0	5–0	2022 FIFA World Cup qualification
5	24 March 2022	Seoul World Cup Stadium, Seoul, South Korea	90	Iran	2–0	2–0	2022 FIFA World Cup qualification
6	14 June 2022	Seoul World Cup Stadium, Seoul, South Korea	94	Egypt	2–0	4–1	Friendly
7	2 December 2022	Education City Stadium, Al Rayyan, Qatar	99	Portugal	1–1	2–1	2022 FIFA World Cup

== Honours ==
Jeonju University

- Korean FA Futsal League: 2009

Guangzhou Evergrande

- Chinese Super League: 2012, 2013, 2014, 2015, 2016, 2017
- Chinese FA Cup: 2012, 2016
- Chinese FA Super Cup: 2016
- AFC Champions League: 2013, 2015

Gamba Osaka

- Emperor's Cup runner-up: 2020

Ulsan Hyundai

- K League 1: 2022, 2023, 2024

South Korea U23

- Summer Olympics bronze medal: 2012
- Asian Games bronze medal: 2010

South Korea

- AFC Asian Cup runner-up: 2015
- EAFF Championship: 2015, 2019

Individual

- Korean FA Futsal League top goalscorer: 2009
- Chinese Super League Team of the Year: 2013, 2014, 2015, 2016
- EAFF Championship Best Defender: 2015
- AFC Champions League Dream Team: 2015
- Korean FA Player of the Year: 2015
- J1 League Fans' Best XI: 2020
- K League 1 Best XI: 2022, 2023
- K League All-Star: 2023, 2025
- K League 1 Most Valuable Player: 2023

== See also ==
- List of men's footballers with 100 or more international caps
