= Kwon Chang-hoon =

South Korean footballer

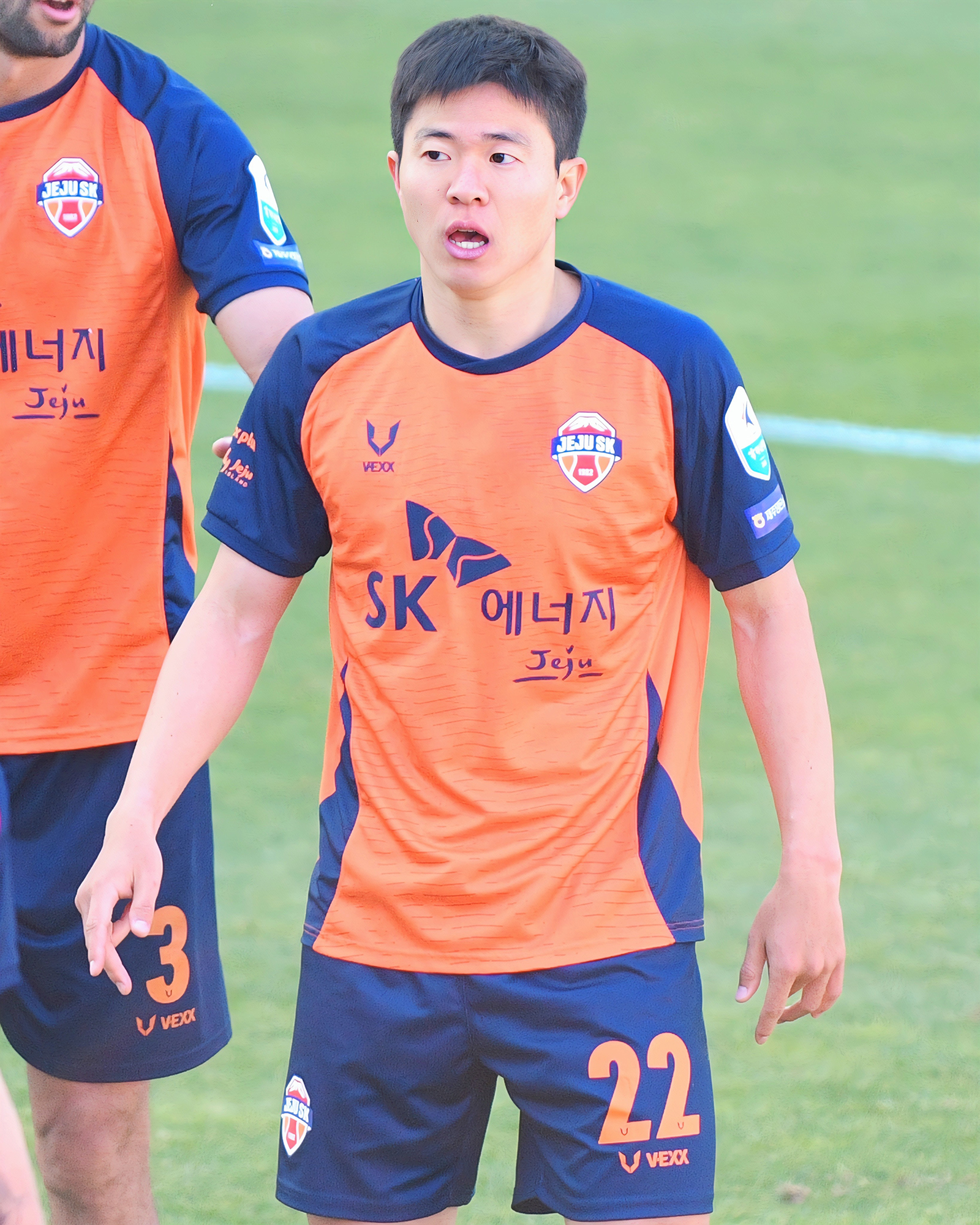
- Kwon with Jeju SK in 2026

Personal information
- Full name: Kwon Chang-hoon
- Date of birth: 30 June 1994 (age 32)
- Place of birth: Seoul, South Korea
- Height: 1.74 m (5 ft 9 in)
- Positions: Attacking midfielder; winger

Team information
- Current team: Persija Jakarta
- Number: 13

Youth career
- 2007–2009: Joongdong Middle School
- 2010–2012: Suwon Samsung Bluewings (Note: Played for Maetan High School, which was an academy of Suwon Samsung Bluewings.)

Senior career*
Years	Team	Apps	(Gls)
2013–2016	Suwon Samsung Bluewings	90	(18)
2017	Dijon B	3	(2)
2017–2019	Dijon	61	(13)
2019–2021	SC Freiburg	35	(2)
2021	SC Freiburg II	1	(0)
2021–2023	Suwon Samsung Bluewings	11	(1)
2022–2023	→ Gimcheon Sangmu (draft)	41	(2)
2024–2025	Jeonbuk Hyundai Motors	31	(2)
2026	Jeju SK	13	(0)
2026–	Persija Jakarta	6	(1)

International career^{‡}
2009–2010	South Korea U17	9	(2)
2011–2013	South Korea U20	17	(6)
2015–2021	South Korea U23	25 (Note: Includes six appearances and one goal as an overage player (four appearances in Summer Olympics, two appearances and one goal in friendlies).)	(11)
2015–	South Korea	43	(12)
Medal record
Men's football
Representing South Korea
AFC U-23 Championship
Runner-up	2016 Qatar
AFC U-19 Championship
Winner	2012 United Arab Emirates
EAFF Championship
Winner	2015 China
Runner-up	2022 Japan
- * Club domestic league appearances and goals as of 8 November 2026 ‡ National team caps and goals as of 28 November 2022

- Kwon Chang-hoon
- Hangul: 권창훈
- Hanja: 權昶勳
- RR: Gwon Changhun
- MR: Kwŏn Ch'anghun
- IPA: [kwʌn.tɕʰaŋ.ɦun]

Kwon Chang-hoon (Korean: 권창훈; born 30 June 1994) is a South Korean professional footballer who plays as an attacking midfielder for Indonesian Super League club Persija Jakarta and the South Korea national team.

== Early life ==
Kwon started playing football when he was attending Seoul Yangjeon Elementary School. After he graduated from Joongdong Middle School, he entered Maetan High School, which had the under-18 team of K League club Suwon Samsung Bluewings.

== Club career ==
=== Suwon Samsung Bluewings ===
Kwon was promoted to the senior team of Suwon Samsung Bluewings during the 2013 K League draft. On 3 April 2013, he came on as a 79th-minute substititue in a 6–2 AFC Champions League defeat to Kashiwa Reysol, making his professional debut. On 6 April, he made his K League 1 debut in a 3–1 win over Daegu FC. On 30 April, he scored his first goal for Suwon in a 2–2 Champions League draw with Guizhou Renhe.

Kwon was a substitute of Suwon until 2014, but became a key player after changing his position from central midfielder to attacking midfielder in 2015. That year, he scored 10 league goals and was selected for the league's Best XI. On 26 October 2016, he led Suwon to the Korean FA Cup final by having one goal and one assist in the 3–1 semi-final win over Ulsan Hyundai. On 3 December, he lifted the FA Cup trophy after the team defeated FC Seoul 10–9 on penalties in the final.

=== Dijon ===
In January 2017, Kwon joined Ligue 1 club Dijon on a 3.5-year deal. The transfer fee paid to Suwon was estimated at €1.5 million. In the 2017–18 season, he scored 11 league goals, taking charge of Dijon's attack with striker Júlio Tavares, who scored 12 goals. However, he injured his Achilles tendon in the last league match of the season, and showed a decline in his ability due to the aftereffect as well as being absent from the 2018 FIFA World Cup.

=== SC Freiburg ===
On 28 June 2019, Kwon transferred to Bundesliga side SC Freiburg. On 24 August, he scored his first goal for Freiburg, while making his Bundesliga debut in a 3–1 win over SC Paderborn. He played 35 league matches including 28 matches as a substitute for two years at Freiburg due to his frequent injuries. He returned to his country at the end of the 2020–21 season to prepare for his military duty.

=== Return to Suwon ===
==== Enlistment in Gimcheon Sangmu ====
Kwon rejoined Suwon Samsung Bluewings on 26 May 2021, and played for them before enlisting in K League 1's military team Gimcheon Sangmu in December. In 2022, he showed poor performances without a goal while playing 33 league matches for Gimcheon. He did not bring out a different side of him in the relegation play-offs, where the club lost 6–1 on aggregate to Daejeon Hana Citizen. On 22 April 2023, he suffered an Achilles injury again in a K League 2 match against Seoul E-Land, starting to take a rest.

==== Discharge from Gimcheon ====
On 26 June 2023, Kwon was discharged from Gimcheon Sangmu, coming back to Suwon Samsung Bluewings. He attempted to transfer to a European club during the summer transfer window, but did not receive an offer. He had remained at the club, but did not feature for Suwon due to persistent injuries until the club was relegated to the K League 2 at the end of the 2023 season. Following the expiration of his contract, it was reported that he would leave for league rivals Jeonbuk Hyundai Motors. Suwon fans, who had not been able to meet him throughout the season, were disconcerted by the sudden news, and their confusion was converted into fury over him after it was confirmed. He was guaranteed the club's highest salary and received support from the club to overcome long-term injuries, whereas he did not visit the stadium to greet their fans until their relegation was decided. He apologized to the fans on Instagram just before the announcement of his transfer, but was eventually criticised for pursuing his own interests only without consideration for the club and fans.

=== Jeonbuk Hyundai Motors ===
On 7 January 2024, Kwon joined K League 1 club Jeonbuk Hyundai Motors on a free transfer. On 17 August, he made his debut for Jeonbuk as a 60th-minute substitute in a league match against Pohang Steelers, playing on the field for the first time in 483 days. He also scored the winning goal in stoppage time before the match ended in a 2–1 win. In 2025, he started to be used as a left-back by manager Gus Poyet. He played as a substitute for Jeonbuk, but his positional change helped the team win the Double.

=== Persija Jakarta ===
Kwon played for fellow K League 1 side Jeju SK between March and May 2026 after receiving an offer from Sérgio Costa, their new manager and former assistant coach of the South Korea national team. On 17 July, however, he moved to Super League club Persija Jakarta, managed by Shin Tae-yong, the former South Korea manager and another of his mentors.

== International career ==
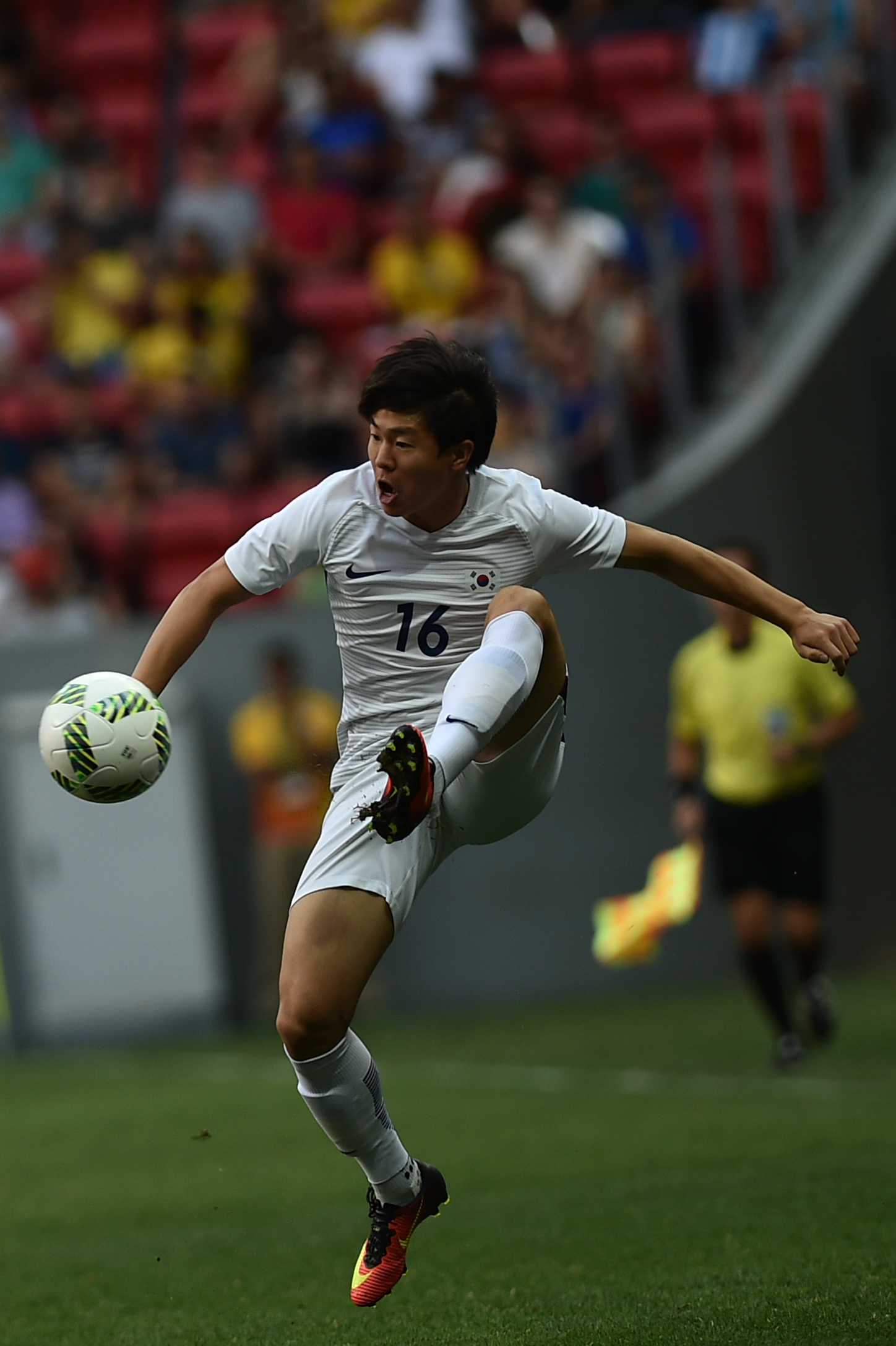
Kwon at the 2016 Summer Olympics

As a youth international, Kwon participated at the 2012 AFC U-19 Championship and the 2013 FIFA U-20 World Cup, and won the former tournament.

Kwon was called up to the South Korea national team for the 2015 EAFF East Asian Cup. He made his international debut in a 2–0 East Asian Cup win over China. On 3 September 2015, he scored his first and second international goals in a FIFA World Cup qualifier against Laos, where South Korea won 8–0.

While Kwon played for South Korea under-23 team at the 2016 AFC U-23 Championship, his winning goal in the 3–1 semi-final win over Qatar led them to qualify for the 2016 Summer Olympics. During the Summer Olympics, he scored the only goal in a 1–0 win over Mexico, which sent the team to the quarter-finals.

Kwon became one of South Korea's key players after manager Shin Tae-yong was promoted from the under-23 team to the senior team in August 2017. He was named in their preliminary 28-man squad for the 2018 FIFA World Cup as expected, but his Achilles tendon injury in Dijon's last match of the season excluded him from the squad for the tournament.

Kwon was called up as an overage player to the South Korea under-23s for the 2020 Summer Olympics. He was eliminated in the quarter-finals of the Summer Olympics for the second consecutive time after a 6–3 loss to Mexico.

Kwon steadily played for South Korea under manager Paulo Bento, but his call-up was criticised by fans, who regarded other players as better players than him. Despite their criticism, Bento continuously trusted him until the 2022 FIFA World Cup. In a 3–2 loss to Ghana, he made his World Cup debut, but the assessment about him was not overturned.

== Career statistics ==
=== Club ===
As of 17 May 2026

Appearances and goals by club, season and competition
Club	Season	League			National cup		League cup		Continental		Other		Total	
Club	Season	Division	Apps	Goals	Apps	Goals	Apps	Goals	Apps	Goals	Apps	Goals	Apps	Goals
Suwon Samsung Bluewings	2013	K League 1	8	0	1	0	—		2 (Note: Appearances in AFC Champions League)	1	—		11	1
Suwon Samsung Bluewings	2014	K League 1	20	1	0	0	—		—		—		20	1
Suwon Samsung Bluewings	2015	K League 1	35	10	1	0	—		7	1	—		43	11
Suwon Samsung Bluewings	2016	K League 1	27	7	4	1	—		4	1	—		35	9
Suwon Samsung Bluewings	Total		90	18	6	1	—		13	3	—		109	22
Dijon B	2016–17	National 3	3	2	—		—		—		—		3	2
Dijon	2016–17	Ligue 1	8	0	0	0	0	0	—		—		8	0
Dijon	2017–18	Ligue 1	34	11	1	0	1	0	—		—		36	11
Dijon	2018–19	Ligue 1	19	2	3	1	1	0	—		1 (Note: Appearance in Ligue 1 relegation play-offs)	1	24	4
Dijon	Total		61	13	4	1	2	0	—		1	1	68	15
SC Freiburg	2019–20	Bundesliga	23	2	0	0	—		—		—		23	2
SC Freiburg	2020–21	Bundesliga	12	0	2	1	—		—		—		14	1
SC Freiburg	Total		35	2	2	1	—		—		—		37	3
SC Freiburg II	2020–21	Regionalliga Südwest	1	0	—		—		—		—		1	0
Suwon Samsung Bluewings	2021	K League 1	11	1	—		—		—		—		11	1
Gimcheon Sangmu (draft)	2022	K League 1	33	0	1	0	—		—		2 (Note: Appearances in K League promotion-relegation play-offs)	0	36	0
Gimcheon Sangmu (draft)	2023	K League 2	8	2	1	0	—		—		—		9	2
Gimcheon Sangmu (draft)	Total		41	2	2	0	—		—		2	0	45	2
Jeonbuk Hyundai Motors	2024	K League 1	8	2	0	0	—		3 (Note: Appearances in AFC Champions League Two)	1	1	0	12	3
Jeonbuk Hyundai Motors	2025	K League 1	23	0	4	0	—		4	0	—		31	0
Jeonbuk Hyundai Motors	Total		31	2	4	0	—		7	1	1	0	43	3
Jeju SK	2026	K League 1	13	0	—		—		—		—		13	0
Persija Jakarta	2026–27	Super League (Indonesia)	0	0	0	0	0	0	—		—		0	0
Career total			286	40	18	3	2	0	20	4	4	1	330	48

=== International ===
Scores and results list South Korea's goal tally first, score column indicates score after each Kwon goal.

List of international goals scored by Kwon Chang-hoon
No.	Date	Venue	Opponent	Score	Result	Competition
1	3 September 2015	Hwaseong Stadium, Hwaseong, South Korea	Laos	3–0	8–0	2018 FIFA World Cup qualification
2	3 September 2015	Hwaseong Stadium, Hwaseong, South Korea	Laos	6–0	8–0	2018 FIFA World Cup qualification
3	8 September 2015	Saida Municipal Stadium, Sidon, Lebanon	Lebanon	3–0	3–0	2018 FIFA World Cup qualification
4	24 March 2018	Windsor Park, Belfast, Northern Ireland	Northern Ireland	1–0	1–2	Friendly
5	10 October 2019	Hwaseong Stadium, Hwaseong, South Korea	Sri Lanka	8–0	8–0	2022 FIFA World Cup qualification
6	5 June 2021	Goyang Stadium, Goyang, South Korea	Turkmenistan	4–0	5–0	2022 FIFA World Cup qualification
7	7 September 2021	Suwon World Cup Stadium, Suwon, South Korea	Lebanon	1–0	1–0	2022 FIFA World Cup qualification
8	15 January 2022	Mardan Sports Complex, Antalya, Turkey	Iceland	2–0	5–1	Friendly
9	21 January 2022	Mardan Sports Complex, Antalya, Turkey	Moldova	3–0	4–0	Friendly
10	1 February 2022	Rashid Stadium, Dubai, United Arab Emirates	Syria	2–0	2–0	2022 FIFA World Cup qualification
11	14 June 2022	Seoul World Cup Stadium, Seoul, South Korea	Egypt	4–1	4–1	Friendly
12	20 July 2022	Toyota Stadium, Toyota, Japan	China	2–0	3–0	2022 EAFF Championship

== Honours ==
Suwon Samsung Bluewings

- Korean FA Cup: 2016

Jeonbuk Hyundai Motors

- K League 1: 2025
- Korea Cup: 2025

Persija Jakarta

- Piala Presiden third place: 2026

South Korea U20

- AFC U-19 Championship: 2012

South Korea U23

- AFC U-23 Championship runner-up: 2016

South Korea

- EAFF Championship: 2015

Individual

- K League All-Star: 2015, 2022
- K League 1 Best XI: 2015, 2016
