= Hwang Hee-chan =

South Korean footballer (born 1996)

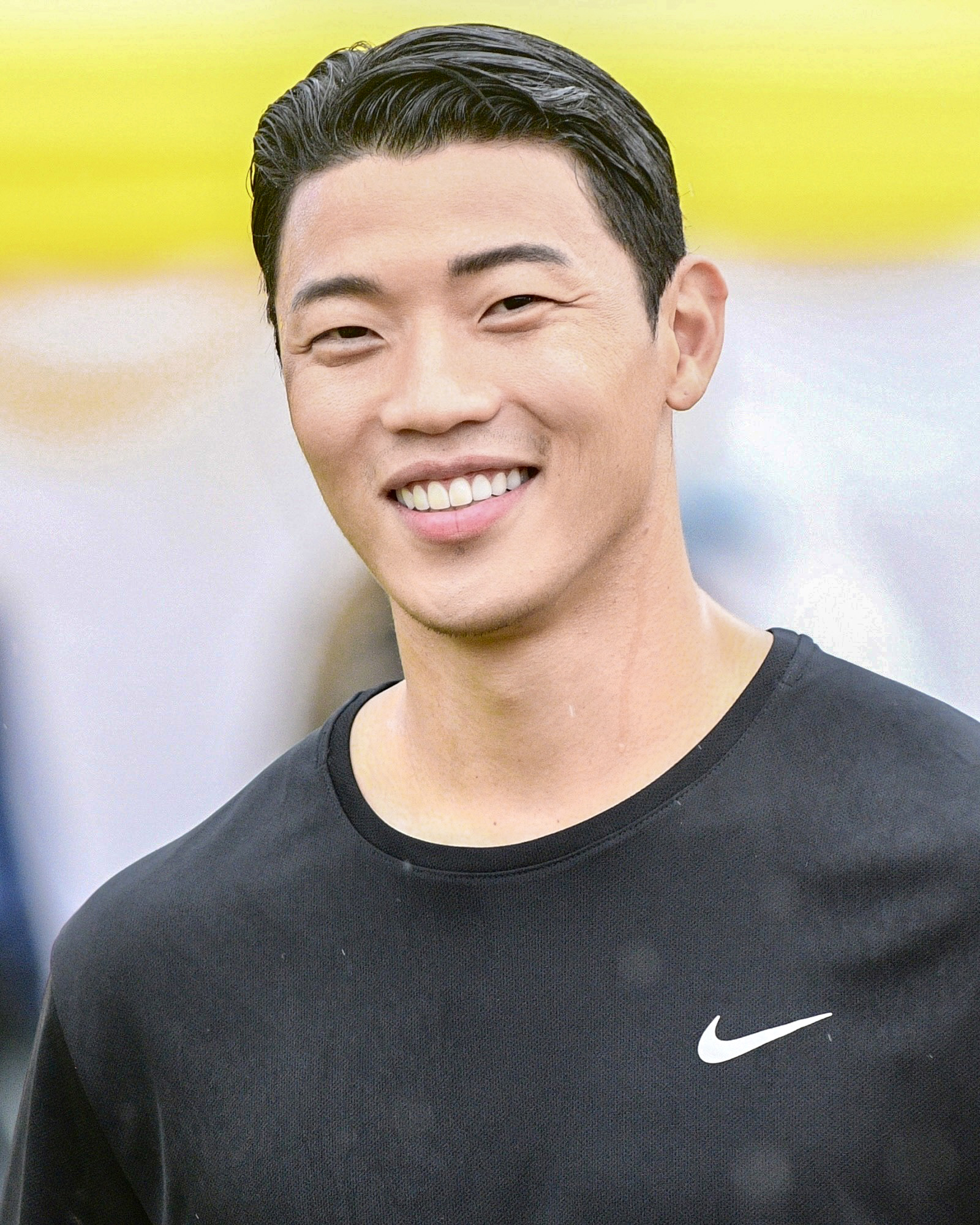
- Hwang in 2024

Personal information
- Full name: Hwang Hee-chan
- Date of birth: 26 January 1996 (age 30)
- Place of birth: Chuncheon, South Korea
- Height: 1.77 m (5 ft 10 in)
- Position: Forward

Team information
- Current team: Schalke 04 (on loan from Wolverhampton Wanderers)
- Number: 7

Youth career
- 2009–2014: Pohang Steelers (Note: Played for Pohang Jecheol Middle School from 2009 to 2011, and Pohang Jecheol High School from 2012 to 2014, which were academies of Pohang Steelers.)

Senior career*
| Years | Team | Apps | (Gls) |
| 2015–2020 | Red Bull Salzburg | 86 | (28) |
| 2015–2016 | → FC Liefering (loan) | 31 | (13) |
| 2018–2019 | → Hamburger SV (loan) | 20 | (2) |
| 2020–2022 | RB Leipzig | 20 | (0) |
| 2021–2022 | → Wolverhampton Wanderers (loan) | 30 | (5) |
| 2022– | Wolverhampton Wanderers | 103 | (19) |
| 2026– | → Schalke 04 (loan) | 8 | (0) |

International career^{‡}
| 2011–2012 | South Korea U17 | 7 | (7) |
| 2013–2014 | South Korea U20 | 12 | (6) |
| 2015–2018 | South Korea U23 | 22 | (5) |
| 2016– | South Korea | 86 | (17) |
Medal record
Representing South Korea
Men's football
Asian Games
| Gold medal – first place | 2018 Jakarta-Palembang |
AFC U-23 Championship
| Runner-up | 2016 Qatar |
- * Club domestic league appearances and goals as of 22 November 2026 ‡ National team caps and goals as of 13 November 2026

- Hwang Hee-chan
- Hangul: 황희찬
- Hanja: 黄喜燦
- RR: Hwang Huichan
- MR: Hwang Hŭich'an
- IPA: [hwaŋ.ɦi.t͡ɕʰan]

Hwang Hee-chan (Korean: 황희찬; born 26 January 1996) is a South Korean professional footballer who plays as a forward for Bundesliga club Schalke 04, on loan from EFL Championship club Wolverhampton Wanderers, and the South Korea national team.

Hwang is nicknamed "Hwangso" (황소), the Korean word for bull, in South Korea due to his aggressive playing style and surname.

== Youth career ==
Hwang Hee-chan was born in Chuncheon, but his family moved to Bucheon right after his birth. They lived there until he was eleven years old.

Hwang started to play football at Uijeongbu Singok Elementary School. In 2008, he scored the most goals in both Hwarangdaegi Tournament and Dongwon Youth Cup, which were South Korean national youth competitions. His strong performance continued in the South Korean national under-12 team. Hwang scored 22 goals in the Kanga Cup, setting a new record of the tournament. With outstanding performances in these competitions, he was awarded the grand prize of the Cha Bum-kun Football Award, given to the best youth footballers in South Korea.

After graduating from Singok Elementary School, he entered Pohang Jecheol Middle School and started to play in Pohang Steelers under-15 team, the school's affiliated football club. In 2011, his team won the middle school division of the Korean National School League, hosted by Korea Football Association, and Hwang received the MVP award of the competition.

Subsequently, he joined Pohang Jecheol High School and Pohang Steelers under-18 team. In the 2013 K League Junior, contested between youth teams of K League clubs, he scored 12 goals in 12 games for his team, helping his high school to win the league. Afterwards, in the high school division of the National School League, he once again led Pohang to the title, becoming the MVP in addition to the top scorer.

== Club career ==
=== Red Bull Salzburg ===
In December 2014, Pohang Steelers intended to sign forward Hwang Hee-chan as a homegrown player, but he opted to sign with Austrian club Red Bull Salzburg. On 3 November 2016, Hwang came off the bench and scored a brace in a Europa League match for Salzburg against Ligue 1 side Nice, contributing to his team's first Europa win of the campaign. He failed to score in his first Austrian Bundesliga season.

During the 2017–18 season Salzburg had their best ever European campaign. They finished top of their UEFA Europa League group for a record fourth time before beating Real Sociedad and Borussia Dortmund, thus making their first-ever appearance in the competition's quarter-finals. On 12 April, Hwang scored a goal against Lazio, leading a 4–1 victory to proceed to the semi-finals.

On 3 May 2018, Hwang played in the second away match of the semi-final, when Salzburg defeated Marseille by 1–2 but lost on aggregate 3–2. On 31 August 2018, Hwang joined Hamburger SV on a loan deal until the end of the 2018–19 season.

During the 2019–20 season, Hwang drew plaudits alongside Salzburg's attacking players Erling Haaland and Takumi Minamino. The trio were particularly praised for their exploits in the Champions League, where Hwang was involved in eight goals by recording three goals and three assists, and winning two penalty kicks. His playing style was described as energetic with accurate passing and an eye for dribbling. In all competitions, Hwang had a remarkable season, scoring 16 goals and providing 22 assists in 40 appearances.

=== RB Leipzig ===
On 8 July 2020, Hwang signed for RB Leipzig on a five-year contract. On 12 September, he scored a goal and created an assist against Nürnberg in the first round of the 2020–21 DFB-Pokal, where he made his debut. He helped Leipzig to reach the 2021 DFB-Pokal Final by scoring against VfL Wolfsburg and Werder Bremen, though he was a substitute. However, he failed to score in his first German Bundesliga season.

=== Wolverhampton Wanderers ===
On 29 August 2021, Hwang joined Premier League side Wolverhampton Wanderers on a season long loan. On 11 September, Hwang scored Wolves' second goal away to Watford on his debut as a second-half substitute in a 2–0 win. He then got his first goals at Molineux on 2 October, as he scored both goals in Wolves' 2–1 win against Newcastle United, both strikes coming from similarly tight angles.

On 26 January 2022, the club announced that they had activated a clause in his loan deal that would see him join the club on a permanent deal on 1 July 2022, upon the expiration of his loan, signing a contract until 2026. He scored five goals in his debut campaign in the Premier League.

Hwang scored his first FA Cup goal away to Liverpool in the third round of the competition on 7 January 2023, his strike tying the game at 2–2. Wolves then had a third goal disallowed in controversial circumstances, the game ultimately finishing all square. On 30 September, Hwang scored the decisive goal against Manchester City to win the match 2–1 at home to give the 2022–23 Premier League champions their first loss in the 2023–24 season. On 28 October, Hwang scored Wolves's second goal in a 2–2 home draw with Newcastle United, meaning he became the first Wolves player since Derek Dougan, fifty years previously, to score six goals in the first ten games of a top-flight season.

On 21 December 2023, Hwang signed a new long-term contract with Wolves, keeping him at the club until 2028 with an option for a further year. On 27 December, he scored a brace in a 4–1 away win over Brentford, becoming the third Wolves player to score at least 10 Premier League goals in one season, following Raúl Jiménez and Steven Fletcher.

In July 2024, during a friendly match with Como 1907, Hwang reportedly heard a racist remark towards him from Como. Como later reported that the remark was calling Hwang "Jackie Chan", who is a Chinese actor that commonly features in Asian stereotypes. Hwang's teammate Daniel Podence reportedly threw a punch in defence of Hwang, which led to Podence receiving a red card. Hwang's team issued a statement of support for him, and filed a complaint to the UEFA. Como 1907 defended the remark and claimed it was not racist.

==== Loan to Schalke 04 ====
On 1 September 2026, Hwang signed for Bundesliga club Schalke 04 on loan for the 2026–27 season with an option to make the move permanent.

== International career ==
In the 2012 AFC U-16 Championship, South Korea was eliminated in the quarter-finals, but Hwang became the top scorer of the tournament with five goals including a hat-trick against North Korea.

Hwang participated in the 2016 Summer Olympics and scored a goal in a group match against Germany, which finished in a 3–3 draw.

In a friendly on 28 March 2018, Hwang scored South Korea's second goal against Poland, with the match ending in a 2–3 loss.

Hwang represented South Korea in the under-23 team at the 2018 Asian Games where he scored the second and winning goal for South Korea in the 2–1 final against Japan, a goal assisted by Son Heung-min. The tournament win guaranteed Hwang and his teammates exemption from mandatory military service.

In the 2018 FIFA World Cup, Hwang started in South Korea's first two matches against Sweden and Mexico. He was criticised for not converting a scoring chance against Sweden. He was substituted in for Koo Ja-cheol in the 2–0 victory against Germany, but was brought off after only 20 minutes for Go Yo-han. After the tournament, manager Shin Tae-yong expressed remorse for taking off Hwang and explained that it was a tactical decision as Hwang was struggling to help the team on defence.

In the 2022 FIFA World Cup, Hwang scored the winning goal in stoppage time against Portugal to secure a 2–1 win, which helped South Korea advance to the Round of 16, where they were eliminated by Brazil following a 4–1 defeat on 5 December.

Hwang was called up for the 2023 AFC Asian Cup, but suffered a hip injury just before the competition. He could not participate in South Korea's first two matches, and played as a substitute in the last group stage match and round of 16. In a 2–1 quarter-final win over Australia, he scored a penalty equaliser and won a crucial free-kick, which was followed by Son Heung-min's winning goal. He came back to the club after a 2–0 semi-final loss to Jordan.

He received a call-up by Hong Myung-bo to join the 2026 FIFA World Cup squad by South Korea.

== Career statistics ==
=== Club ===
As of match played 22 November 2026

Appearances and goals by club, season and competition
| Club | Season | League | | | National cup (Note: Includes Austrian Cup, DFB-Pokal, FA Cup) | | League cup (Note: Includes EFL Cup) | | Europe | | Total | |
| Club | Season | Division | Apps | Goals | Apps | Goals | Apps | Goals | Apps | Goals | Apps | Goals |
|---|---|---|---|---|---|---|---|---|---|---|---|---|
| FC Liefering (loan) | 2014–15 | Austrian 2. Liga | 13 | 2 | — | | — | | — | | 13 | 2 |
| FC Liefering (loan) | 2015–16 | Austrian 2. Liga | 18 | 11 | — | | — | | — | | 18 | 11 |
| FC Liefering (loan) | Total | | 31 | 13 | — | | — | | — | | 31 | 13 |
| Red Bull Salzburg | 2015–16 | Austrian Bundesliga | 13 | 0 | 1 | 0 | — | | — | | 14 | 0 |
| Red Bull Salzburg | 2016–17 | Austrian Bundesliga | 26 | 12 | 6 | 2 | — | | 3 (Note: Appearances in UEFA Europa League) | 2 | 35 | 16 |
| Red Bull Salzburg | 2017–18 | Austrian Bundesliga | 20 | 5 | 3 | 3 | — | | 14 (Note: Four appearances and two goals in UEFA Champions League, ten appearances and three goals in UEFA Europa League) | 5 | 37 | 13 |
| Red Bull Salzburg | 2019–20 | Austrian Bundesliga | 27 | 11 | 5 | 1 | — | | 8 (Note: Six appearances and three goals in UEFA Champions League, two appearances and one goal in UEFA Europa League) | 4 | 40 | 16 |
| Red Bull Salzburg | Total | | 86 | 28 | 15 | 6 | — | | 25 | 11 | 126 | 45 |
| Hamburger SV (loan) | 2018–19 | 2. Bundesliga | 20 | 2 | 1 | 0 | — | | — | | 21 | 2 |
| RB Leipzig | 2020–21 | Bundesliga | 18 | 0 | 5 | 3 | — | | 3 (Note: Appearances in UEFA Champions League) | 0 | 26 | 3 |
| RB Leipzig | 2021–22 | Bundesliga | 2 | 0 | 1 | 0 | — | | — | | 3 | 0 |
| RB Leipzig | Total | | 20 | 0 | 6 | 3 | — | | 3 | 0 | 29 | 3 |
| Wolverhampton Wanderers (loan) | 2021–22 | Premier League | 30 | 5 | 0 | 0 | 1 | 0 | — | | 31 | 5 |
| Wolverhampton Wanderers | 2022–23 | Premier League | 27 | 3 | 1 | 1 | 4 | 0 | — | | 32 | 4 |
| Wolverhampton Wanderers | 2023–24 | Premier League | 29 | 12 | 1 | 0 | 1 | 1 | — | | 31 | 13 |
| Wolverhampton Wanderers | 2024–25 | Premier League | 21 | 2 | 2 | 0 | 2 | 0 | — | | 25 | 2 |
| Wolverhampton Wanderers | 2025–26 | Premier League | 26 | 2 | 2 | 1 | 3 | 0 | — | | 31 | 3 |
| Wolverhampton Wanderers | Total | | 103 | 19 | 6 | 2 | 10 | 1 | — | | 119 | 22 |
| Schalke 04 (loan) | 2026–27 | Bundesliga | 8 | 0 | 1 | 0 | — | | — | | 9 | 0 |
| Career total | | | 298 | 67 | 29 | 11 | 11 | 1 | 28 | 11 | 366 | 90 |

=== International ===
As of match played 13 November 2026

Appearances and goals by national team and year
| National team | Year | Apps | Goals |
|---|---|---|---|
| South Korea | 2016 | 3 | 0 |
| South Korea | 2017 | 6 | 1 |
| South Korea | 2018 | 12 | 1 |
| South Korea | 2019 | 11 | 2 |
| South Korea | 2020 | 2 | 1 |
| South Korea | 2021 | 9 | 2 |
| South Korea | 2022 | 8 | 3 |
| South Korea | 2023 | 8 | 2 |
| South Korea | 2024 | 10 | 3 |
| South Korea | 2025 | 6 | 1 |
| South Korea | 2026 | 11 | 1 |
| Total | | 86 | 17 |

Scores and results list South Korea's goal tally first, score column indicates score after each Hwang goal.

List of international goals scored by Hwang Hee-chan
| No. | Date | Venue | Opponent | Score | Result | Competition |
|---|---|---|---|---|---|---|
| 1 | 13 June 2017 | Jassim bin Hamad Stadium, Al Rayyan, Qatar | Qatar | 2–2 | 2–3 | 2018 FIFA World Cup qualification |
| 2 | 27 March 2018 | Stadion Śląski, Chorzów, Poland | Poland | 2–2 | 2–3 | Friendly |
| 3 | 22 January 2019 | Rashid Stadium, Dubai, United Arab Emirates | Bahrain | 1–0 | 2–1 (a.e.t.) | 2019 AFC Asian Cup |
| 4 | 10 October 2019 | Hwaseong Stadium, Hwaseong, South Korea | Sri Lanka | 3–0 | 8–0 | 2022 FIFA World Cup qualification |
| 5 | 17 November 2020 | BSFZ-Arena, Maria Enzersdorf, Austria | Qatar | 1–0 | 2–1 | Friendly |
| 6 | 9 June 2021 | Goyang Stadium, Goyang, South Korea | Sri Lanka | 4–0 | 5–0 | 2022 FIFA World Cup qualification |
| 7 | 11 November 2021 | Goyang Stadium, Goyang, South Korea | United Arab Emirates | 1–0 | 1–0 | 2022 FIFA World Cup qualification |
| 8 | 6 June 2022 | Daejeon World Cup Stadium, Daejeon, South Korea | Chile | 1–0 | 2–0 | Friendly |
| 9 | 23 September 2022 | Goyang Stadium, Goyang, South Korea | Costa Rica | 1–0 | 2–2 | Friendly |
| 10 | 2 December 2022 | Education City Stadium, Al Rayyan, Qatar | Portugal | 2–1 | 2–1 | 2022 FIFA World Cup |
| 11 | 17 October 2023 | Suwon World Cup Stadium, Suwon, South Korea | Vietnam | 2–0 | 6–0 | Friendly |
| 12 | 16 November 2023 | Seoul World Cup Stadium, Seoul, South Korea | Singapore | 2–0 | 5–0 | 2026 FIFA World Cup qualification |
| 13 | 2 February 2024 | Al Janoub Stadium, Al Wakrah, Qatar | Australia | 1–1 | 2–1 (a.e.t.) | 2023 AFC Asian Cup |
| 14 | 6 June 2024 | National Stadium, Kallang, Singapore | Singapore | 7–0 | 7–0 | 2026 FIFA World Cup qualification |
| 15 | 10 September 2024 | Sultan Qaboos Sports Complex, Muscat, Oman | Oman | 1–0 | 3–1 | 2026 FIFA World Cup qualification |
| 16 | 20 March 2025 | Goyang Stadium, Goyang, South Korea | Oman | 1–0 | 1–1 | 2026 FIFA World Cup qualification |
| 17 | 30 May 2026 | South Field, Provo, United States | Trinidad and Tobago | 4–0 | 5–0 | Friendly |

== Honours ==
Red Bull Salzburg

- Austrian Bundesliga: 2015–16, 2016–17, 2017–18, 2019–20
- Austrian Cup: 2015–16, 2016–17, 2019–20

RB Leipzig

- DFB-Pokal runner-up: 2020–21

South Korea U23

- Asian Games: 2018
- AFC U-23 Championship runner-up: 2016

Individual

- AFC U-16 Championship top goalscorer: 2012
- Korean FA Goal of the Year: 2022
- IFFHS Asian Men's Team of the Year: 2022, 2023, 2024
