= Goyang Stadium =

Multipurpose stadium in Goyang, South Korea

- 고양종합운동장
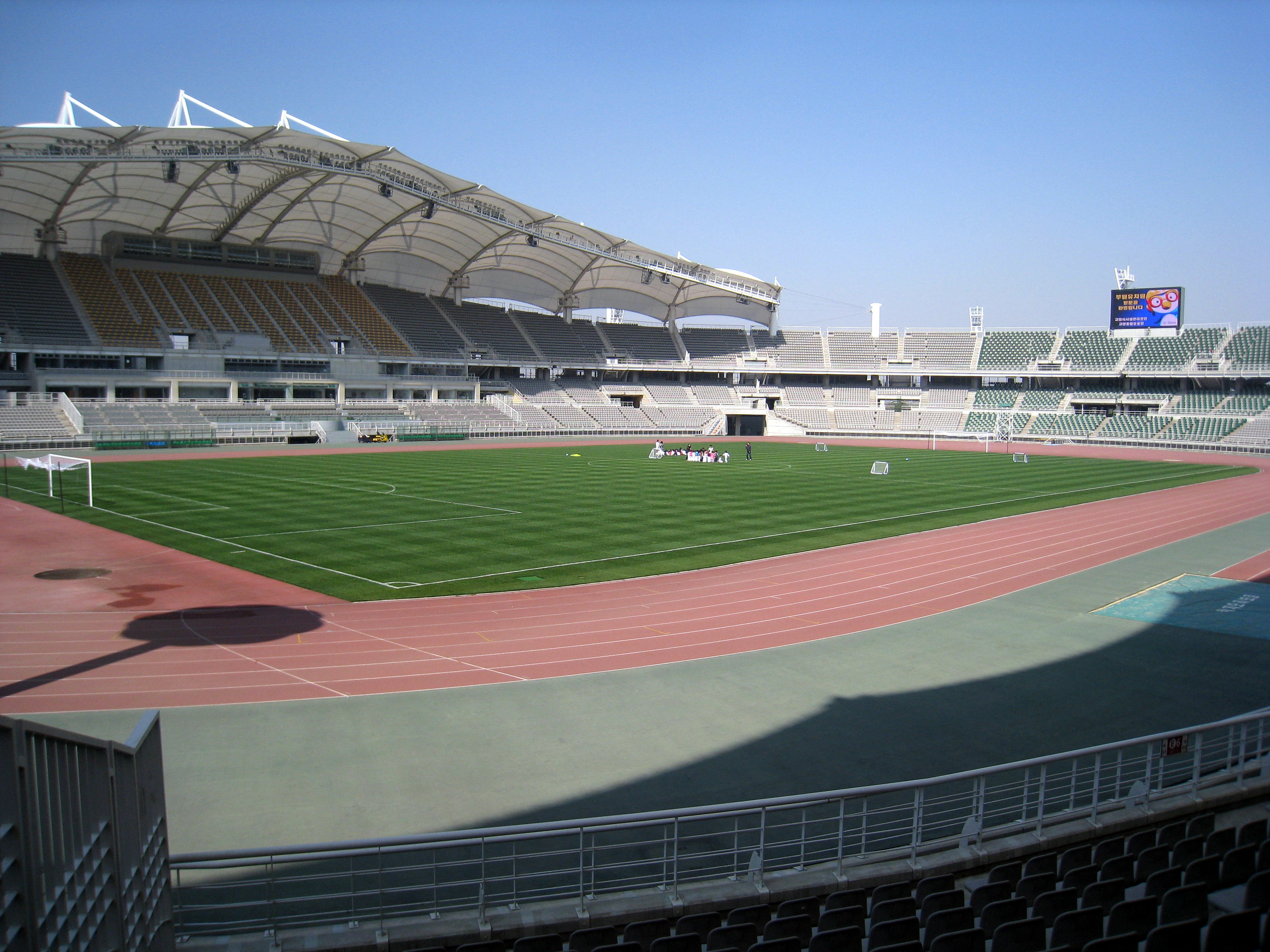
- Goyang Stadium in 2008
- Interactive map of Goyang Stadium
- Address: 1601 Jungang-ro, Ilsanseo-gu, Goyang, Gyeonggi Province, South Korea
- Location: Goyang, South Korea
- Coordinates: 37°40′34.87″N 126°44′35.55″E
- Operator: Goyang City Facilities Management
- Capacity: 41,311
- Surface: Grass

Construction
- Groundbreaking: 26 September 2000
- Opened: 26 September 2003
- Cost: 120 billion won

Tenants
- Goyang KB Kookmin Bank (2003–2012); Goyang Zaicro (2013–2016); Goyang Citizen (2017)

Goyang Stadium is a multi-purpose stadium in Goyang, South Korea. It is used mostly for football matches and was the home ground of Goyang Zaicro FC of the K League Challenge from 2013 to 2016. Completed in 2003, it has a seating capacity of 41,311. The stadium is also occasionally used for matches of the South Korea national football team.

== Concerts ==
Due to the renovation of the Seoul Olympic Stadium, which began in 2023, the availability of large concert venues in Seoul has become limited. As a result, large concerts have increasingly been held at nearby venues in the Seoul metropolitan area, including Goyang Stadium.

List of concerts held at the Goyang Stadium
Date(s)	Artist	Event	Ref.
2024
23 August	¥$	Vultures Listening Experience	
5–6 October	Enhypen	Walk the Line Tour	
12–13 October	Seventeen	Right Here World Tour	
2025
29–30 March	G-Dragon	Übermensch World Tour	
16–25 April	Coldplay	Music of the Spheres World Tour	
13–14 June	J-Hope	Hope on the Stage Tour	
5–6 July	Blackpink	Deadline World Tour	
30–31 August	Day6	Day6 10th Anniversary Tour "The Decade"	
21 October	Oasis	Oasis Live '25 Tour	
25 October	Travis Scott	Circus Maximus Tour	
2026
9, 11 and 12 April	BTS	Arirang World Tour	
