= Vitalij Lux =

Kyrgyz footballer (born 1989)

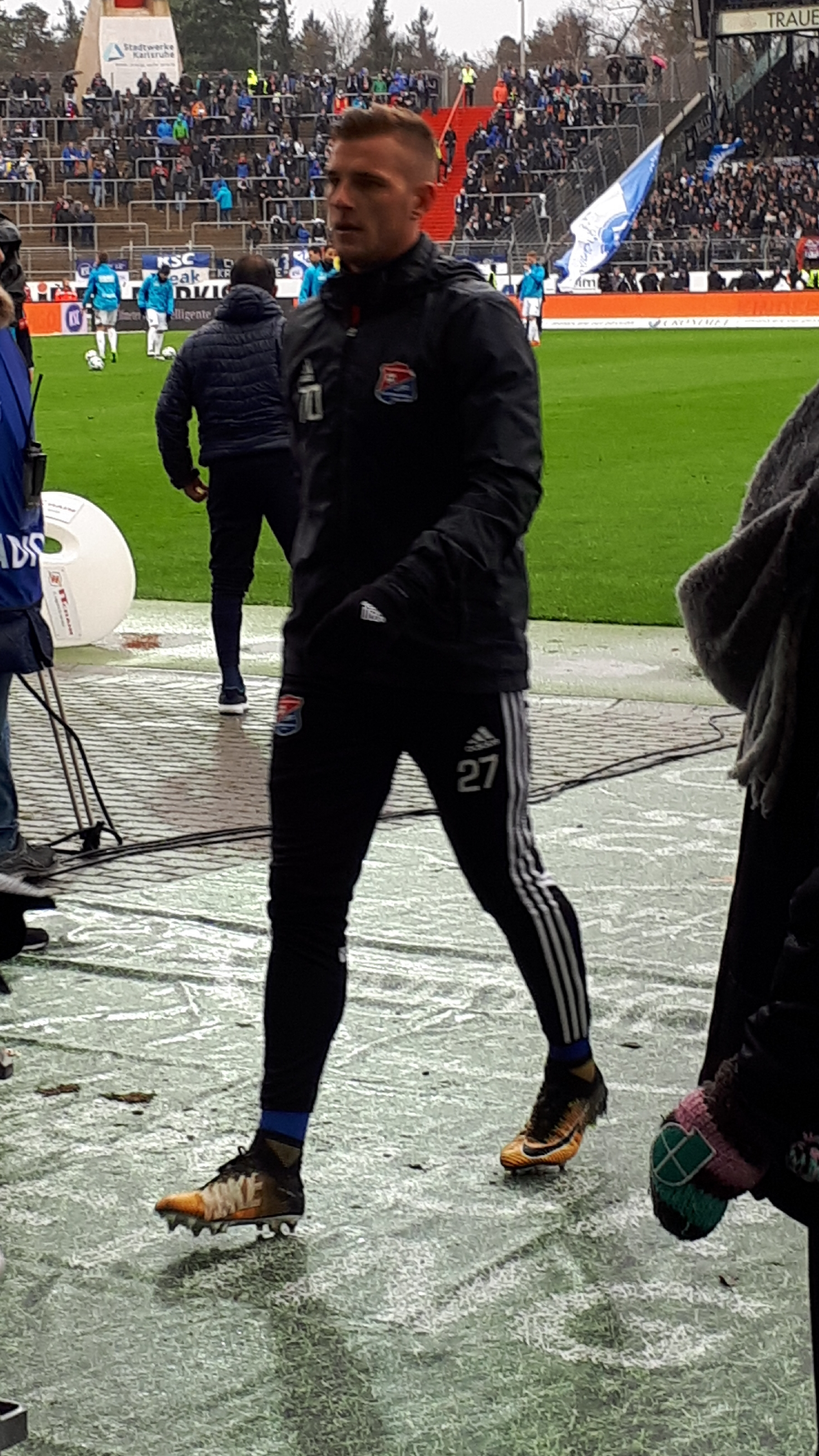
- Lux with SpVgg Unterhaching in 2018

Personal information
- Full name: Vitalij Lux
- Date of birth: 27 February 1989 (age 37)
- Place of birth: Kara-Balta, Kirghiz SSR, Soviet Union
- Height: 1.83 m (6 ft 0 in)
- Position: Forward

Senior career*
Years	Team	Apps	(Gls)
–2009	FV Weißenhorn 1920		
2009–2010	TSG Thannhausen		
2010–2014	FV Illertissen	102	(42)
2014–2015	Carl Zeiss Jena	10	(0)
2015–2016	1. FC Nürnberg II	26	(10)
2016–2018	SpVgg Unterhaching	42	(9)
2018–2019	SSV Ulm	35	(3)
2020	Türkspor Neu-Ulm	2	(1)
2020–2023	TuS Geretsried	19	(3)
2020–2025	TuS Geretsried II	?	(?)

International career
2015–2019	Kyrgyzstan	32	(8)
- * Club domestic league appearances and goals as of 26 August 2026

Vitalij Lux (Kyrgyz: Виталий Люкс, romanized: Vitaliy Lyuks; German pronunciation: [lʊks]; born 27 February 1989) is a former professional footballer, who played as a forward. Lux holds both German and Kyrgyz citizenship, and has represented Kyrgyzstan internationally since 2015.

== Early life ==
Lux was born in Kara-Balta, Soviet Union, but was raised in Ulm, Germany, where he moved to when he was six years old.

== Club career ==
Lux scored his first goal for SpVgg Unterhaching, in a 6–0 win against FC Augsburg II.

He helped Unterhaching get to the final of the 2015–16 Bavarian Cup, scoring a brace in the quarter-finals against Seligenporten, and another two goals in the semifinals against Jahn Regensburg.

== International career ==
Lux was called up in May 2015 by Aleksandr Krestinin to represent Kyrgyzstan national football team in the 2018 FIFA World Cup Qualifiers against Bangladesh and Australia. He made his debut in a 3–1 victory against Bangladesh, playing the full match.

Lux helped Kyrgyzstan reach their first major tournament, the 2019 AFC Asian Cup, where they reached the Round of 16.

== Career statistics ==
=== International ===
As of match played 16 January 2019

Kyrgyzstan national team
Year	Apps	Goals
2015	7	1
2016	8	2
2017	4	1
2018	5	1
2019	6	3
Total	30	8

=== International goals ===
Score and Result lists Kyrgyzstan goals first.

#	Date	Venue	Opponent	Score	Result	Competition
1.	13 October 2015	Spartak Stadium, Bishkek, Kyrgyzstan	Bangladesh	1–0	2–0	2018 FIFA World Cup qualification
2.	29 March 2016	Pamir Stadium, Dushanbe, Tajikistan	Tajikistan	1–0	1–0	2018 FIFA World Cup qualification
3.	6 September 2016	Dolen Omurzakov Stadium, Bishkek, Kyrgyzstan	Philippines	1–2	1–2	Friendly
4.	14 November 2017	Estádio Campo Desportivo, Taipa, Macau	Macau	2–0	4–3	2019 AFC Asian Cup qualification
5.	22 March 2018	Incheon Football Stadium, Incheon, South Korea	Myanmar	4–0	5–1	2019 AFC Asian Cup qualification
6.	16 January 2019	Rashid Stadium, Dubai, United Arab Emirates	Philippines	1–0	3–1	2019 AFC Asian Cup
7.	16 January 2019	Rashid Stadium, Dubai, United Arab Emirates	Philippines	2–0	3–1	2019 AFC Asian Cup
8.	16 January 2019	Rashid Stadium, Dubai, United Arab Emirates	Philippines	3–0	3–1	2019 AFC Asian Cup
