= 2019 AFC Asian Cup Group C =

Football tournament group stage

Group C of the 2019 AFC Asian Cup took place from 7 to 16 January 2019. The group consists of South Korea, China PR, Kyrgyzstan and the Philippines. The top two teams, South Korea and China PR, along with third-placed Kyrgyzstan (as one of the four best third-placed teams), advanced to the round of 16.

South Korea was the only former champion in the group, having won both 1956 and 1960 editions. The Philippines and Kyrgyzstan both made debuts in the tournament.

== Teams ==
Draw position	Team	Zone	Method of qualification	Date of qualification	Finals appearance	Last appearance	Previous best performance	FIFA Rankings	
Draw position	Team	Zone	Method of qualification	Date of qualification	Finals appearance	Last appearance	Previous best performance	April 2018 (Note: The rankings of April 2018 were used for seeding for the final draw.)	December 2018
C1	South Korea	EAFF	Second round group G winners	13 January 2016	14th	2015 (runners-up)	Winners (1956, 1960)	61	53
C2	China	EAFF	Second round group C runners-up (4th best runners-up)	29 March 2016	12th	2015 (quarter-finals)	Runners-up (1984, 2004)	73	76
C3	Kyrgyzstan	CAFA	Third Round Group A runners-up	22 March 2018	1st	—	Debut	75	91
C4	Philippines	AFF	Third Round Group F winners	27 March 2018	1st	—	Debut	113	116

== Standings ==
Pos	Team	Pld	W	D	L	GF	GA	GD	Pts	Qualification
1	South Korea	3	3	0	0	4	0	+4	9	Advance to knockout stage
2	China	3	2	0	1	5	3	+2	6	Advance to knockout stage
3	Kyrgyzstan	3	1	0	2	4	4	0	3	Advance to knockout stage
4	Philippines	3	0	0	3	1	7	−6	0	

Source: AFC
Rules for classification: Group stage tiebreakers

In the round of 16:

- The winners of Group C, South Korea, advanced to play the third-placed team of Group A, Bahrain.
- The runners-up of Group C, China PR, advanced to play the runners-up of Group A, Thailand.
- The third-placed team of Group C, Kyrgyzstan, advanced to play the winners of Group A, the United Arab Emirates (as one of the four best third-placed teams).

== Matches ==
All times listed are GST (UTC+4).

=== China PR vs Kyrgyzstan ===
Kyrgyzstan and China last played against each other in a friendly which ended in a 2–0 win for China.

Wu Lei had China's first effort at goal when he shot straight at Pavel Matyash in the 9th minute. Wu Xi shot just wide following a lay-off from Wu Lei before Gao Lin’s lofted, curling delivery from the left skipped away from a sliding Yu Dabao at the far post and bounced to safety. Mirlan Murzaev’s headed flick found Akhlidin Israilov on the edge of the area and the midfielder volleyed home via the inside of Yan Junling’s left post. Five minutes into the second half, Valery Kichin's attempted headed clearance from a corner went straight up and Matyash, in trying to tip the ball over his crossbar, pushed it into his own net off the woodwork. Twelve minutes later, Wu Xi headed over the bar at the end of a move involving Zhang Linpeng and Gao Lin while Wu Lei also saw his headed attempt clear the goal in the 71st minute. With 12 minutes remaining China took the lead when Wu Xi’s header directed Liu Yang’s long ball from the back into Yu’s path who slotted his shot beyond Matyash.

7 January 2019
15:00

China	2–1	Kyrgyzstan
Matyash 50' (o.g.); Yu Dabao 78'	Report	Israilov 42'

Khalifa bin Zayed Stadium, Al Ain
Attendance: 1,839
Referee: Mohammed Abdulla Hassan Mohamed (United Arab Emirates)

China PR	Kyrgyzstan

GK	1	Yan Junling
RWB	17	Zhang Chengdong	(substituted off) 89'
CB	5	Zhang Linpeng
CB	6	Feng Xiaoting (c)
CB	4	Shi Ke	(substituted off) 46'
LWB	19	Liu Yang
CM	15	Wu Xi
CM	13	Chi Zhongguo
CM	16	Jin Jingdao	(substituted off) 24'
CF	18	Gao Lin
CF	7	Wu Lei
Substitutions:
FW	22	Yu Dabao	(substituted on) 24'
MF	11	Hao Junmin	(substituted on) 46'
DF	2	Liu Yiming	(substituted on) 89'
Manager:
(Italy) Marcello Lippi

GK	1	Pavel Matyash
RB	2	Valery Kichin (c)
CB	23	Akhlidin Israilov		(substituted off) 61'
CB	17	Daniel Tagoe
LB	3	Tamirlan Kozubaev
RW	11	Bekzhan Sagynbaev
CM	18	Kairat Zhyrgalbek Uulu	(yellow card) 57'
CM	21	Farhat Musabekov
LW	9	Edgar Bernhardt		(substituted off) 82'
CF	10	Mirlan Murzaev
CF	19	Vitalij Lux		(substituted off) 88'
Substitutions:
MF	22	Anton Zemlianukhin		(substituted on) 61'
MF	8	Aziz Sydykov		(substituted on) 82'
FW	14	Ernist Batyrkanov		(substituted on) 88'
Manager:
(Russia) Aleksandr Krestinin

Man of the Match:
Wu Lei (China PR)

Assistant referees:
Mohamed Al-Hammadi (United Arab Emirates)
Hasan Al-Mahri (United Arab Emirates)
Fourth official:
Ahmad Al-Roalle (Jordan)
Additional assistant referees:
Ali Sabah (Iraq)
Ammar Al-Jeneibi (United Arab Emirates)

=== South Korea vs Philippines ===
This match was the first meeting between South Korea and the Philippines in 39 years with the last meeting in 1980 ending in an 8–0 win for the Koreans.

South Korea were awarded a free-kick after Luke Woodland fouled Koo Ja-cheol outside the box. Jung Woo-young's resulting strike missed the top left corner of the net by inches. Five minutes from the break, Lee Yong's pass into the penalty box found Hwang Ui-jo, who then turned to unleash a shot but Philippines goalkeeper Michael Falkesgaard made a save to deny him. Moments later, South Korea goalkeeper Kim Seung-gyu parried away Javier Patiño’s volley, that began from a counter-attack after Daisuke Sato intercepted a pass and released a cross to the forward. Ten minutes into the second half, Patiño's shot was saved by Kim. South Korea sent on Hwang In-beom and Lee Chung-yong and less than three minutes later, Lee's pass found Hwang Hee-chan, whose back pass set Ui-jo to open the scoring from close range in the 67th minute. Phil Younghusband replaced John-Patrick Strauß in the final minute of the game, but South Korea held on to claim the win.

7 January 2019
17:30

South Korea	1–0	Philippines
Hwang Ui-jo 67'	Report

Al Maktoum Stadium, Dubai
Attendance: 3,185
Referee: Nawaf Shukralla (Bahrain)

South Korea	Philippines

GK	1	Kim Seung-gyu
RB	2	Lee Yong	(yellow card) 25'
CB	4	Kim Min-jae
CB	19	Kim Young-gwon (c)
LB	3	Kim Jin-su	(yellow card) 77'
CM	5	Jung Woo-young	(yellow card) 52'
CM	16	Ki Sung-yueng		(substituted off) 58'
RW	11	Hwang Hee-chan
AM	13	Koo Ja-cheol		(substituted off) 64'
LW	10	Lee Jae-sung		(substituted off) 86'
CF	18	Hwang Ui-jo
Substitutions:
MF	6	Hwang In-beom		(substituted on) 58'
MF	17	Lee Chung-yong		(substituted on) 64'
MF	8	Ju Se-jong		(substituted on) 86'
Manager:
(Portugal) Paulo Bento

GK	15	Michael Falkesgaard
RB	6	Luke Woodland
CB	2	Álvaro Silva
CB	12	Stephan Palla
LB	11	Daisuke Sato
DM	4	John-Patrick Strauß		(substituted off) 89'
CM	14	Kevin Ingreso		(substituted off) 75'
CM	8	Manuel Ott		(substituted off) 78'
AM	17	Stephan Schröck (c)	(yellow card) 88'
CF	18	Patrick Reichelt	(yellow card) 60'
CF	20	Javier Patiño
Substitutions:
FW	7	Iain Ramsay		(substituted on) 75'
MF	13	Adam Reed		(substituted on) 78'
FW	10	Phil Younghusband		(substituted on) 89'
Manager:
(Sweden) Sven-Göran Eriksson

Man of the Match:
Hwang Ui-jo (South Korea)

Assistant referees:
Yaser Tulefat (Bahrain)
Mohamed Salman (Bahrain)
Fourth official:
Mohammed Al-Abakry (Saudi Arabia)
Additional assistant referees:
Turki Al-Khudhayr (Saudi Arabia)
Mohanad Qassim (Iraq)

=== Philippines vs China PR ===
The last match played between the two sides, a friendly in 2017, concluded in an 8–1 win for the Chinese.

The Philippines threatened to break the deadlock in the 23rd minute when Patrick Reichelt and John-Patrick Strauß combined to set-up Javier Patiño whose goalbound effort was blocked by defender Feng Xiaoting. However, after Wu Xi had flashed a header narrowly wide, China went ahead on 40 minutes, Wu Lei received Hao Junmin's pass and finished from 12 yards past Michael Falkesgaard. In the final moments of the first half, Chinese custodian Yan Junling made a fine save to deny Kevin Ingreso and maintain his side's slender advantage. After the break, Wu Lei's angled volley forced Falkesgaard into a save, before he bagged his second of the game with a finish from Hao's 66th minute free-kick. Falkesgaard then pulled off another stop to deny Wu Lei once again, only for Yu Dabao to add a third in the 80th minute when he headed home from a corner just 19 seconds after coming on as a substitute.

11 January 2019
17:30

Philippines	0–3	China
	Report	Wu Lei 40', 66'; Yu Dabao 80'

Mohammed bin Zayed Stadium, Abu Dhabi
Attendance: 16,013
Referee: Hiroyuki Kimura (Japan)

Philippines	China PR

GK	15	Michael Falkesgaard
RB	6	Luke Woodland
CB	2	Álvaro Silva	(yellow card) 34'
CB	3	Carli de Murga		(substituted off) 66'
LB	11	Daisuke Sato	(yellow card) 55'
RW	14	Kevin Ingreso
CM	4	John-Patrick Strauß		(substituted off) 85'
CM	17	Stephan Schröck (c)
LW	12	Stephan Palla
CF	20	Javier Patiño
CF	18	Patrick Reichelt		(substituted off) 88'
Substitutions:
FW	10	Phil Younghusband		(substituted on) 66'
MF	8	Manuel Ott		(substituted on) 85'
FW	19	Curt Dizon		(substituted on) 88'
Manager:
(Sweden) Sven-Göran Eriksson

GK	1	Yan Junling
CB	5	Zhang Linpeng
CB	6	Feng Xiaoting	(yellow card) 73'
CB	4	Shi Ke
LWB	19	Liu Yang
RWB	15	Wu Xi
CM	8	Zhao Xuri		(substituted off) 72'
DM	10	Zheng Zhi (c)		(substituted off) 83'
CM	11	Hao Junmin
CF	7	Wu Lei
CF	18	Gao Lin		(substituted off) 80'
Substitutions:
MF	20	Yu Hanchao		(substituted on) 72'
FW	22	Yu Dabao		(substituted on) 80'
MF	13	Chi Zhongguo		(substituted on) 83'
Manager:
(Italy) Marcello Lippi

Man of the Match:
Wu Lei (China PR)

Assistant referees:
Mohd Yusri Muhamad (Malaysia)
Jun Mihara (Japan)
Fourth official:
Mohamed Al-Hammadi (United Arab Emirates)
Additional assistant referees:
Ryuji Sato (Japan)
Jumpei Iida (Japan)

=== Kyrgyzstan vs South Korea ===
Twelve minutes into the game, Kutman Kadyrbekov dropped to his left to keep out Koo Ja-cheol's low strike form 25 yards and Tamirlan Kozubaev blocked Hwang Ui-jo's attempt to slot home the rebound. Eleven minutes from the break, Bekzhan Sabynbaev's shot from close range was saved by Kim Seung-gyu. Lee Chung-yong fired over the bar in the 36th minute while Koo shot from distance, only for Kadyrbekov to make another save. The resulting corner by Hong Chul found Kim Min-jae who powered his downward header between Kadyrbekov's legs and over the line. In the 68th minute, Ui-jo's header came back off the crossbar and bounced on the goal line before Kozubaev headed it to safety. Five minutes later, Ui-jo saw another attempt hit the woodwork, this time after Chung-yong's cross-field ball set him up to shoot, Kadyrbekov somehow touched the ball onto the crossbar. A minute later, Hwang Hee-chan managed to clip the top of the crossbar from a central position. But in the end, Min-jae's goal was enough to see off Kyrgyzstan and take the two-time champions into the next phase of the competition.

11 January 2019
20:00

Kyrgyzstan	0–1	South Korea
	Report	Kim Min-jae 41'

Hazza bin Zayed Stadium, Al Ain
Attendance: 4,893
Referee: Khamis Al-Marri (Qatar)

Kyrgyzstan	South Korea

GK	13	Kutman Kadyrbekov
RB	18	Kairat Zhyrgalbek Uulu
CB	17	Daniel Tagoe
CB	3	Tamirlan Kozubaev
LB	2	Valery Kichin (c)
LW	11	Bekzhan Sagynbaev
CM	9	Edgar Bernhardt		(substituted off) 77'
DM	8	Aziz Sydykov		(substituted off) 69'
CM	21	Farhat Musabekov
RW	23	Akhlidin Israilov		(substituted off) 81'
CF	10	Mirlan Murzaev
Substitutions:
FW	19	Vitalij Lux		(substituted on) 69'
MF	20	Bakhtiyar Duyshobekov		(substituted on) 77'
MF	7	Tursunali Rustamov	(yellow card) 83'	(substituted on) 81'
Manager:
(Russia) Aleksandr Krestinin

GK	1	Kim Seung-gyu
RB	2	Lee Yong	(yellow card) 79'
CB	4	Kim Min-jae
CB	19	Kim Young-gwon (c)
LB	14	Hong Chul
DM	5	Jung Woo-young
CM	6	Hwang In-beom
CM	13	Koo Ja-cheol		(substituted off) 63'
RW	11	Hwang Hee-chan
LW	17	Lee Chung-yong
CF	18	Hwang Ui-jo		(substituted off) 82'
Substitutions:
MF	8	Ju Se-jong		(substituted on) 63'
FW	9	Ji Dong-won		(substituted on) 82'
Manager:
(Portugal) Paulo Bento

Man of the Match:
Hwang In-beom (South Korea)

Assistant referees:
Taleb Al-Marri (Qatar)
Saud Al-Maqaleh (Qatar)
Fourth official:
Abu Bakar Al-Amri (Oman)
Additional assistant referees:
Abdulrahman Al-Jassim (Qatar)
Khamis Al-Kuwari (Qatar)

=== South Korea vs China PR ===
Chinese goalkeeper Yan Junling denied Hwang Ui-jo in quick succession and Kim Min-jae headed Son Heung-min’s corner narrowly wide on 8 minutes. Five minutes later, South Korea were ahead. Son weaved his way into the Chinese penalty area before being brought down by Shi Ke’s outstretched leg. Ui-jo scored from the spot to hand his side an early lead. China could have drawn level in the 19th minute when Jin Jingdao latched onto Zhao Xuri’s pass but proceeded to fire his shot over the bar with only goalkeeper Kim Seung-gyu to beat. Shortly after that, Hwang Hee-chan’s effort forced Yan into another stop and Ui-jo hit the upright from a curling effort. Within six minutes of the restart, the Koreans scored a second, with Min-jae finding the target with a header from a Son corner. Shortly before the hour mark, Jung Woo-young headed Son’s free kick just over the bar and then, at the other end, Wu Xi flashed a well-placed shot off target. Hee-chan sent a header wide off the far post as South Korea held on to the score.

16 January 2019
17:30

South Korea	2–0	China
Hwang Ui-jo 14' (pen.); Kim Min-jae 51'	Report

Al Nahyan Stadium, Abu Dhabi
Attendance: 13,579
Referee: Abdulrahman Al-Jassim (Qatar)

South Korea	China PR

GK	1	Kim Seung-gyu
RB	22	Kim Moon-hwan
CB	4	Kim Min-jae
CB	19	Kim Young-gwon
LB	3	Kim Jin-su
CM	6	Hwang In-beom
CM	5	Jung Woo-young
RW	11	Hwang Hee-chan
AM	17	Lee Chung-yong	(substituted off) 81'
LW	7	Son Heung-min (c)	(substituted off) 89'
CF	18	Hwang Ui-jo	(substituted off) 70'
Substitutions:
FW	9	Ji Dong-won	(substituted on) 70'
MF	8	Ju Se-jong	(substituted on) 81'
MF	13	Koo Ja-cheol	(substituted on) 89'
Manager:
(Portugal) Paulo Bento

GK	1	Yan Junling
CB	2	Liu Yiming
RB	5	Zhang Linpeng	(yellow card) 79'
CB	4	Shi Ke
LB	19	Liu Yang		(substituted off) 74'
CM	17	Zhang Chengdong	(yellow card) 21'
RM	10	Zheng Zhi (c)		(substituted off) 57'
LM	8	Zhao Xuri	(yellow card) 20'
LW	16	Jin Jingdao
CF	22	Yu Dabao
RW	15	Wu Xi		(substituted off) 61'
Substitutions:
MF	13	Chi Zhongguo		(substituted on) 57'
FW	18	Gao Lin	(yellow card) 90'	(substituted on) 61'
MF	20	Yu Hanchao		(substituted on) 74'
Manager:
(Italy) Marcello Lippi

Man of the Match:
Son Heung-min (South Korea)

Assistant referees:
Mohd Yusri Muhamad (Malaysia)
Mohamad Zainal Abidin (Malaysia)
Fourth official:
Saud Al-Maqaleh (Qatar)
Additional assistant referees:
Khamis Al-Marri (Qatar)
Khamis Al-Kuwari (Qatar)

=== Kyrgyzstan vs Philippines ===
Vitalij Lux gave Kyrgyzstan the lead in the 24th minute from a side foot effort into the top corner following Akhlidin Israilov's low, hard cross. Israilov fired narrowly over the crossbar and Lux hit the upright, but despite a tally of 15 shots at goal to their opponents' two, Kyrgyzstan were unable to add to their lead before the half-time whistle. Lux turned and fired the ball into the top corner from Bekzhan Sagynbaev's pass in the 51st minute to score his second of the day. Javier Patiño forced goalkeeper Kutman Kadyrbekov into a low save. Then, head coach Sven-Göran Eriksson introduced Phil Younghusband and James Younghusband into the fray. Lux completed his hat-trick in the 77th minute when he struck Mirlan Murzaev's woodwork-bound initial effort from close range. Stephan Schröck scored from a long-range free kick three minutes later to give the Philippines their first ever goal at the tournament.

16 January 2019
17:30

Kyrgyzstan	3–1	Philippines
Lux 24', 51', 77'	Report	Schröck 80'

Rashid Stadium, Dubai
Attendance: 4,217
Referee: Turki Al-Khudhayr (Saudi Arabia)

Kyrgyzstan	Philippines

GK	13	Kutman Kadyrbekov
CB	4	Mustafa Iusupov
CB	3	Tamirlan Kozubaev	(yellow card) 12'
CB	2	Valery Kichin (c)
RWB	18	Kairat Zhyrgalbek Uulu
LWB	11	Bekzhan Sagynbaev
DM	9	Edgar Bernhardt	(yellow card) 66'
AM	21	Farhat Musabekov	(yellow card) 36'	(substituted off) 80'
AM	23	Akhlidin Israilov		(substituted off) 73'
SS	10	Mirlan Murzaev		(substituted off) 85'
CF	19	Vitalij Lux
Substitutions:
MF	8	Aziz Sydykov		(substituted on) 73'
MF	22	Anton Zemlianukhin		(substituted on) 80'
MF	7	Tursunali Rustamov		(substituted on) 85'
Manager:
(Russia) Aleksandr Krestinin

GK	15	Michael Falkesgaard
CB	6	Luke Woodland	(yellow card) 66'
CB	13	Adam Reed		(substituted off) 60'
CB	2	Álvaro Silva	(yellow card) 45'
LWB	11	Daisuke Sato
RWB	12	Stephan Palla	(yellow card) 2'	(substituted off) 75'
RM	18	Patrick Reichelt
CM	8	Manuel Ott		(substituted off) 59'
CM	17	Stephan Schröck (c)
LM	14	Kevin Ingreso	(yellow card) 90+1'
CF	20	Javier Patiño
Substitutions:
FW	10	Phil Younghusband		(substituted on) 59'
FW	23	James Younghusband		(substituted on) 60'
DF	19	Curt Dizon		(substituted on) 75'
Manager:
(Sweden) Sven-Göran Eriksson

Man of the Match:
Vitalij Lux (Kyrgyzstan)

Assistant referees:
Mohammed Al-Abakry (Saudi Arabia)
Ronnie Koh Min Kiat (Singapore)
Fourth official:
Palitha Hemathunga (Sri Lanka)
Additional assistant referees:
Muhammad Taqi (Singapore)
Hettikamkanamge Perera (Sri Lanka)

== Discipline ==
Fair play points were used as tiebreakers if the head-to-head and overall records of teams were tied (and if a penalty shoot-out was not applicable as a tiebreaker). These were calculated based on yellow and red cards received in all group matches as follows:

- yellow card = 1 point
- red card as a result of two yellow cards = 3 points
- direct red card = 3 points
- yellow card followed by direct red card = 4 points

Only one of the above deductions was applied to a player in a single match.

Team	Match 1				Match 2				Match 3				Points
Team	Yellow card	(yellow card) (yellow-red card)	Red card	(yellow card) (red card)	Yellow card	(yellow card) (yellow-red card)	Red card	(yellow card) (red card)	Yellow card	(yellow card) (yellow-red card)	Red card	(yellow card) (red card)	Points
South Korea	3				1								−4
China					1				4				−5
Kyrgyzstan	1				1				3				−5
Philippines	2				2				4				−8
