= Kutman Kadyrbekov =

Kyrgyzstani association football player

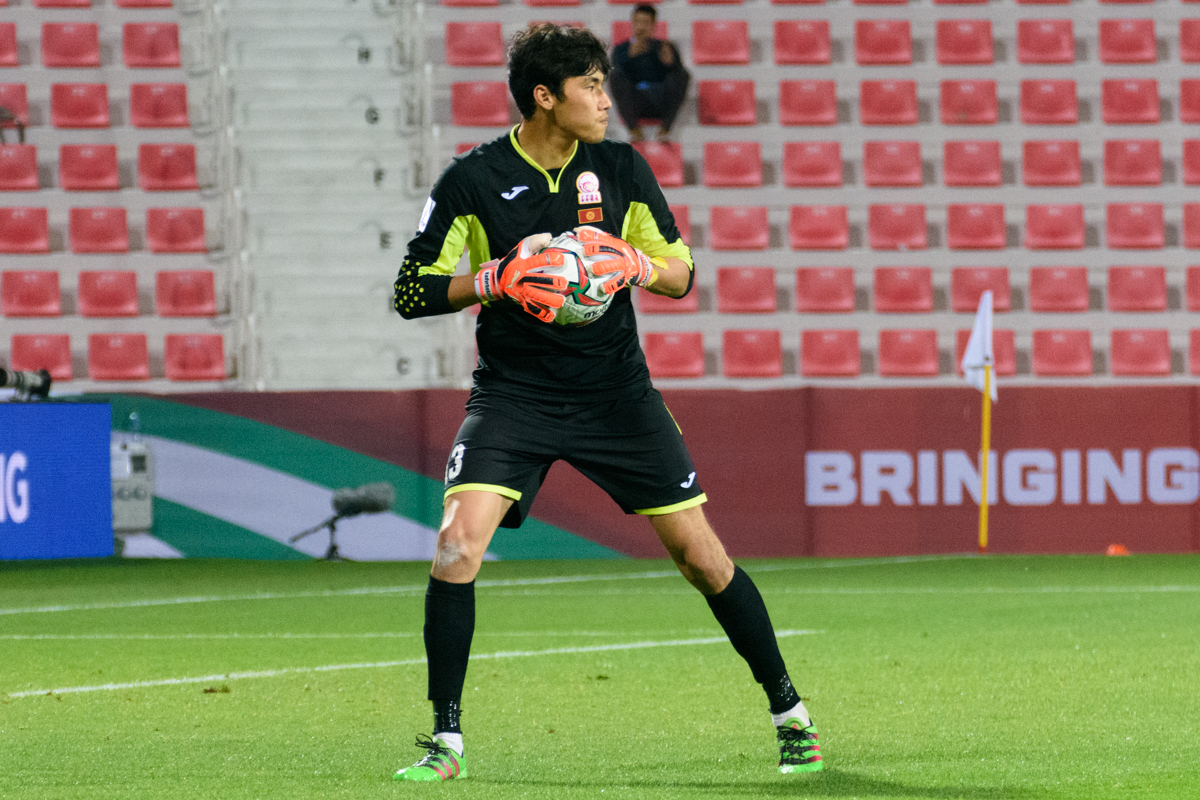

Personal information
- Full name: Kutman Kadyrbekovich Kadyrbekov
- Date of birth: 13 June 1997 (age 29)
- Place of birth: Bishkek, Kyrgyzstan
- Height: 1.92 m (6 ft 4 in)
- Position: Goalkeeper

Team information
- Current team: Asiagoal Bishkek
- Number: 13

Senior career*
Years	Team	Apps	(Gls)
2015–2016	Ala-Too Naryn		
2016–2022	Dordoi Bishkek	18	(0)
2022	Alga Bishkek	4	(0)
2022	FC Dordoi Bishkek	9	(0)
2023	FC Abdysh-Ata Kant	8	(0)

International career
2019–	Kyrgyzstan	4	(0)
- * Club domestic league appearances and goals

Kutman Kadyrbekovich Kadyrbekov (Kyrgyz: Кутман Кадырбеков; Russian: Кутман Кадырбекович Кадырбеков; born June 13, 1997) is a Kyrgyz professional footballer who plays as a goalkeeper for Kyrgyz Premier League club Asiagoal Bishkek and the Kyrgyzstan national team.

== Career ==
=== Club ===
He won the Kyrgyzstan League with Dordoi Bishkek in 2018.

=== International ===
He was included in Kyrgyzstan's squad for the 2018 Asian Games in Indonesia, and the 2019 AFC Asian Cup in the United Arab Emirates. Kadyrbekov made his debut for Kyrgyzstan national football team in an AFC Asian Cup group match on 11 January 2019 against South Korea.

== Career statistics ==
=== Club ===
As of 15 May 2022

Club	Season	League			Cup		Continental		Total	
Club	Season	Division	Apps	Goals	Apps	Goals	Apps	Goals	Apps	Goals
Dordoi Bishkek	2018	Kyrgyz Premier League	0	0	0	0	1 (Note: Appearance(s) in AFC Cup)	0	1	0
Dordoi Bishkek	2019	Kyrgyz Premier League	1	0	0	0	—		1	0
Dordoi Bishkek	2020	Kyrgyz Premier League	0	0	0	0	—		0	0
Dordoi Bishkek	2021	Kyrgyz Premier League	17	0	3 (Note: Appearance(s) in Kyrgyzstan Cup)	0	2	0	22	0
Alga Bishkek	2022	Kyrgyz Premier League	4	1	0	0	—		4	1
Career total			22	1	3	0	3	0	28	1

=== International ===
Kyrgyzstan national team
Year	Apps	Goals
2019	3	0
Total	3	0

Statistics accurate as of match played 21 January 2019
