= Molten Acentec =

Official match ball of a football tournament

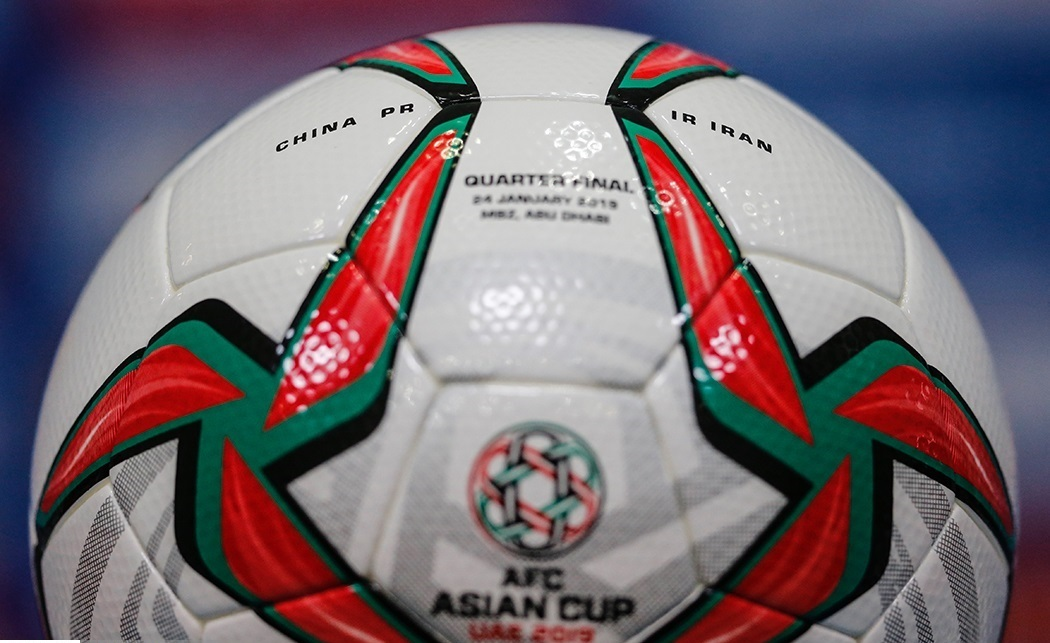
Ball during 2019 AFC Asian Cup

The Molten Acentec was the official match ball for the 2019 AFC Asian Cup tournament.

== Design ==
Molten Corporation, which is known for designing volleyballs and basketballs, was chosen by the United Arab Emirates, the host of the tournament, to design the ball. It was the first time ever that Molten was chosen for a football tournament.

According to the Company, Molten was to supply match balls designed specially for the AFC Asian Cup utilizing the basic design of Molten’s flagship model Vantaggio 5000 Premier football.
