= Akhlidin Israilov =

Kyrgyzstani footballer

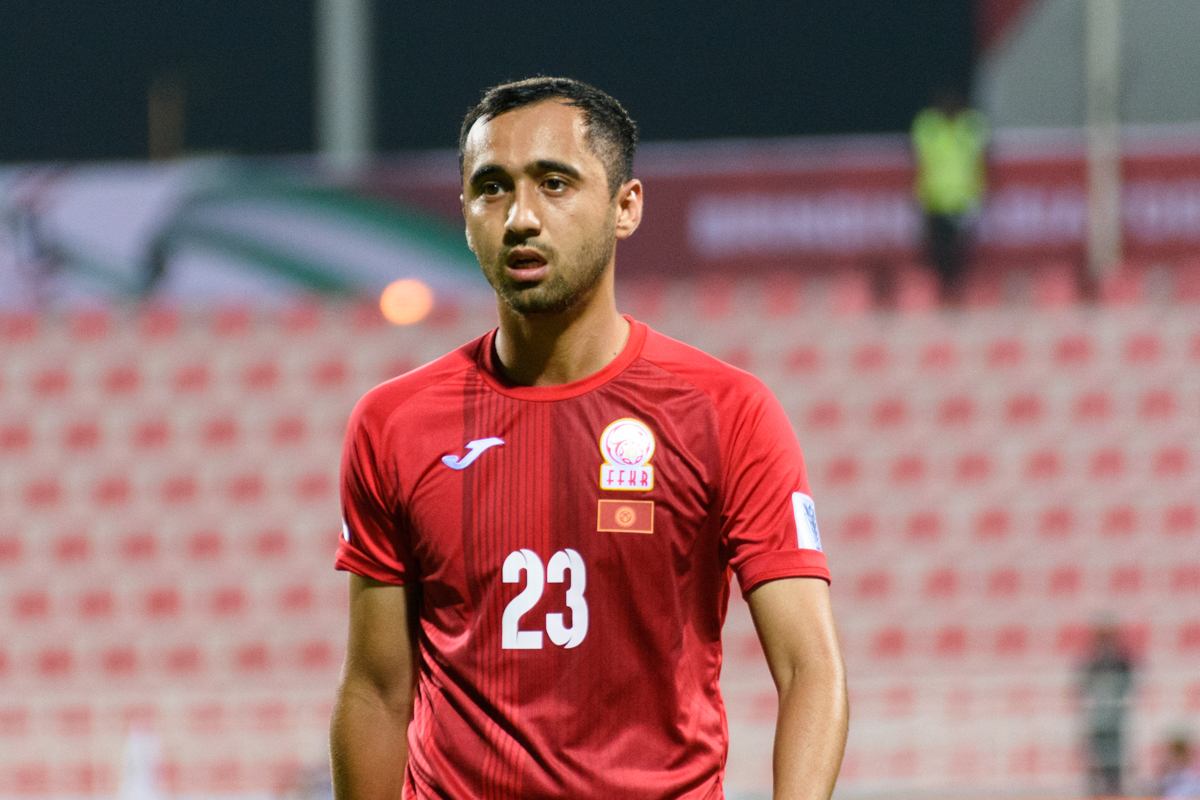
- Israilov with Kyrgyzstan at the 2019 AFC Asian Cup

Personal information
- Full name: Akhlidin Shukurovich Israilov
- Date of birth: 16 September 1994 (age 32)
- Place of birth: Kara-Suu, Kyrgyzstan
- Height: 1.80 m (5 ft 11 in)
- Position: Midfielder

Youth career
- Dynamo Kyiv

Senior career*
Years	Team	Apps	(Gls)
2012–2016	Dynamo-2 Kyiv	73	(12)
2016–2017	Cherkashchyna	7	(1)
2017	NEROCA	9	(0)
2018	PSIS Semarang	5	(0)
2018–2019	Andijon	0	(0)
2019	UiTM United	3	(0)
2020–2021	Samut Sakhon City	4	(0)
2021	FC Alay	25	(6)
2022–2024	Neftchi Kochkor-Ata	43	(5)

International career
2014–2016	Kyrgyzstan U21	12	(1)
2013–2022	Kyrgyzstan	34	(4)
- * Club domestic league appearances and goals as of 25 October 2023

Akhlidin Shukurovich Israilov (Russian: Ахлидин Шукурович Исраилов, tr. Akhlidin Shukurovich Israilov; born 16 September 1994) is a Kyrgyz professional footballer who plays as a midfielder.

== Career ==
In his first year for his club, Israilov scored 4 goals from 15 matches. His goals included a brace against Odesa. He also played 2 cup matches against Shakhtar Sverdlovsk.

Israilov made his international debut on 15 October 2013 against Tajikistan. He scored a goal as well as received a yellow card, as Kyrgyzstan defeated Tajikistan 1–4.

== International statistics ==
Scores and results list Kyrgyzstan's goal tally first.

No	Date	Venue	Opponent	Score	Result	Competition
1.	15 October 2013	Dolen Omurzakov Stadium, Bishkek, Kyrgyzstan	Tajikistan	1–4	1–4	Friendly
2.	16 May 2014	Al Kuwait Sports Club Stadium, Kuwait City, Kuwait	Kuwait	1–0	2–2	Friendly
3.	31 December 2018	Suheim bin Hamad Stadium, Doha, Qatar	Palestine	1–0	2–1	Friendly
4.	7 January 2019	Khalifa bin Zayed Stadium, Al Ain, United Arab Emirates	China	1–0	1–2	2019 AFC Asian Cup
