= Al Maktoum Stadium =

Multi-purpose stadium in Dubai, United Arab Emirates

Coordinates: 25°14′24″N 55°18′47″E

Al-Maktoum Stadium
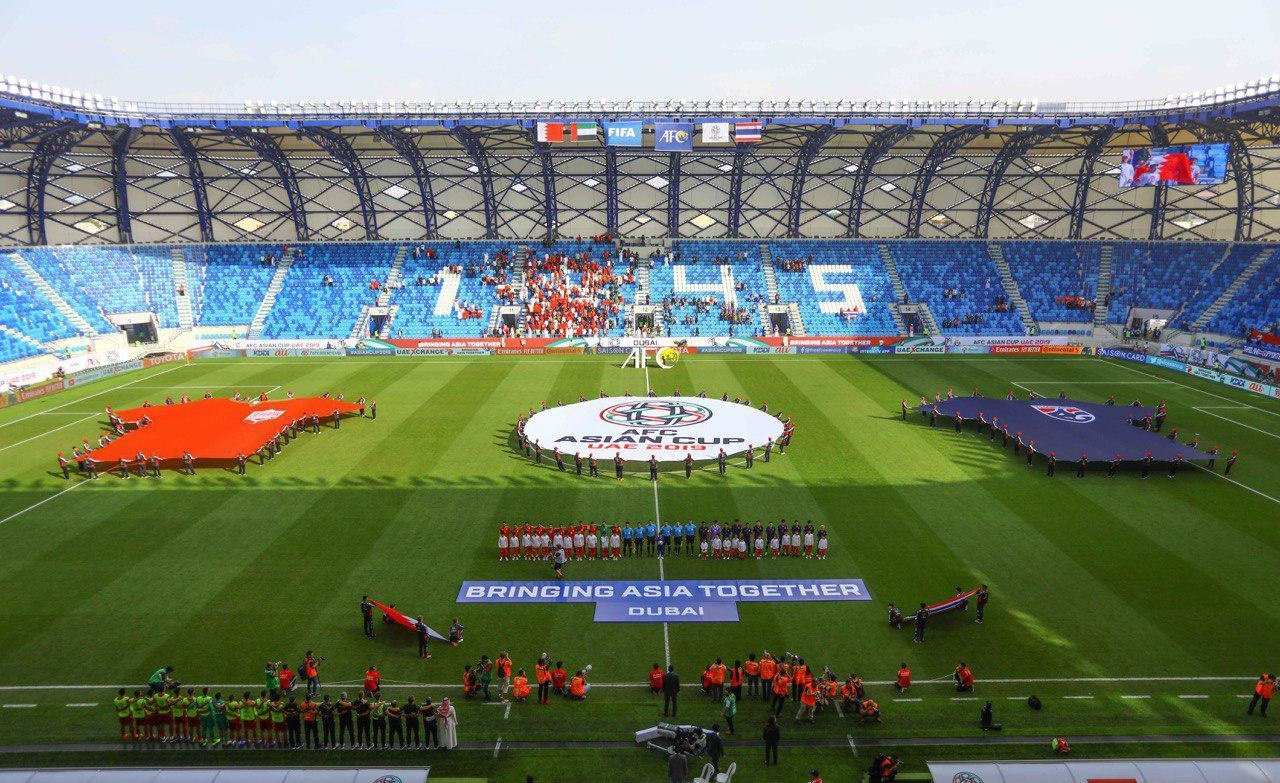
- Al-Maktoum Stadium hosting a match between Bahrain and Thailand during the 2019 AFC Asian Cup
- Interactive map of Al-Maktoum Stadium
- Location: Dubai, United Arab Emirates
- Capacity: 15,058
- Surface: Grass

Construction
- Groundbreaking: 2017; 9 years ago
- Built: 1980; 46 years ago
- Opened: 1981; 45 years ago
- Renovated: 2018; 8 years ago
- Architect: Omar Bin Eid
- General contractor: Bin Ladin Contracting

Tenants
- Al Nasr; UAE national football team United FC (Dubai) (2026-present)

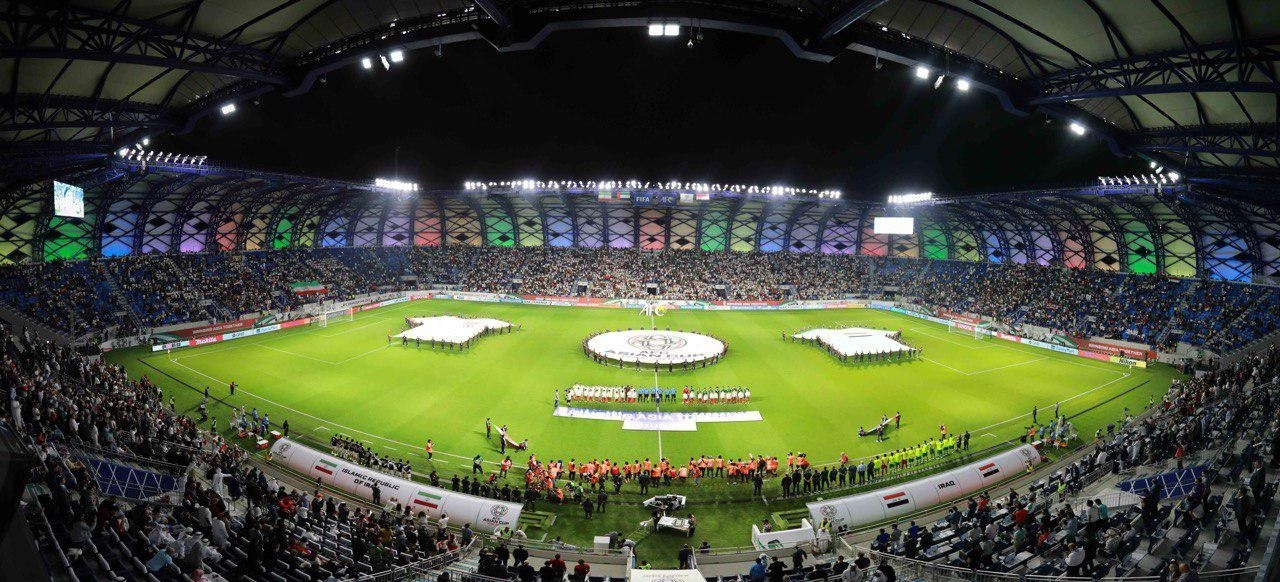
Al-Maktoum Stadium hosting a match between Iran and Iraq during the 2019 AFC cup

Al-Maktoum Stadium (Arabic: ملعب آل مكتوم) is a multi-purpose stadium in Oud Metha, Dubai, United Arab Emirates. It is currently used mostly for football matches and is the home ground of both Al Nasr SC and United FC. The stadium holds roughly 15,000 people.

It was upgraded for the 2019 AFC Asian Cup. This was in order to meet the regulations set by the Asian Football Confederation to host matches on a continental scale, and so that Dubai would be able to host more matches and events in the venue.

== History ==
The rapid growth of UAE football in the early 1970s prompted the construction of a proper home stadium for Al Nasr SC. Thus, The construction of Al-Maktoum Stadium began in 1974 at a site in Oud Metha, and the stadium was inaugurated in 1978. The inaugural match of the stadium took place on May 26th of the same year against English club Liverpool F.C, who would go on to beat Al Nasr 5-0.

With a capacity of 12,000 spectators, the original stadium featured low stands, an oval shape, and an athletics track encompassing the pitch, which was a common layout in UAE stadiums built during this era. By 1995, the stadium underwent a minor upgrade, in which a new Grandstand on the west side of the stadium was constructed.

=== 2017-2018 Renovation ===
After the UAE acquired hosting rights for the 2019 AFC Asian Cup, it became necessary to redevelop the now-outdated venue in order to meet requirements set by the AFC for host venues. The Demolition of the old ground (excluding the Grandstand built in 1995) commenced in October of 2017, and the new stadium officially opened in December 2018 with a new capacity of 15,000 spectators.

View of the stadium from the East Stand.

== 2019 AFC Asian Cup ==
Al Maktoum Stadium hosted six games of the 2019 AFC Asian Cup, including a Round of 16 and a quarter-final match.

Date	Time	Team No. 1	Res.	Team No. 2	Round	Attendance
7 January 2019	17:30	South Korea	1–0	Philippines	Group C	3,185
10 January 2019	15:00	Bahrain	0–1	Thailand	Group A	2,720
12 January 2019	20:00	Lebanon	0–2	Saudi Arabia	Group E	13,792
16 January 2019	20:00	Iran	0–0	Iraq	Group D	15,038
20 January 2019	15:00	Jordan	1–1 (aet) (2–4 PSO)	Vietnam	Round of 16	14,205
24 January 2019	17:00	Vietnam	0–1	Japan	Quarter-finals	8,954

== Layout and construction ==
The Al Maktoum Stadium's renovation was completed in 2019 after construction broke ground in 2018. The original stadium was built in the 1970s.

== Dubai Super Cup ==
Al Maktoum Stadium hosted the final of the Dubai Super Cup in December 2022, where Arsenal F.C. won against AC Milan with a score of 2–1.

== See also ==
- Lists of stadiums
- List of football stadiums in the United Arab Emirates
