= 2019 AFC Asian Cup =

17th edition of the AFC Asian Cup

كأس آسيا 2019

Tournament details
- Host country: United Arab Emirates
- Dates: 5 January – 1 February
- Teams: 24 (from 1 confederation)
- Venues: 8 (in 4 host cities)

Final positions
- Champions: Qatar (1st title)
- Runners-up: Japan

Tournament statistics
- Matches played: 51
- Goals scored: 130 (2.55 per match)
- Attendance: 644,307 (12,633 per match)
- Top scorer: (Qatar) Almoez Ali (9 goals)
- Best player: (Qatar) Almoez Ali
- Best goalkeeper: (Qatar) Saad Al-Sheeb
- Fair play award: Japan

The 2019 AFC Asian Cup (or commonly called the Asian Cup 2019) was the 17th edition of the men's AFC Asian Cup, the quadrennial international football championship of Asia organised by the Asian Football Confederation (AFC). It was held in the United Arab Emirates from 5 January to 1 February 2019.

For the first time, 24 teams competed for the title, replacing the 16-team format used from 2004 to 2015. Under this new format, the finalists would contest a group stage consisting of six groups of four teams, followed by a knockout stage of 16 teams. The host nation qualified for the final tournament automatically, while the remaining 23 places were determined among the other 45 national teams of the AFC through a qualifying competition running from 2015 to 2018, part of which also served as part of the 2018 FIFA World Cup qualification process for the confederation. It was the first of three consecutive Asian Cups held in Middle East, preceding the 2023 AFC Asian Cup in Qatar and the 2027 AFC Asian Cup in Saudi Arabia.

The tournament was won for the first time by Qatar, who defeated Japan 3–1 in the final. This was Qatar's first ever top-four finish in the competition. Defending champions Australia were eliminated in the quarter-finals by the hosts United Arab Emirates, who subsequently lost to eventual winners Qatar in the semi-finals.

== Host selection ==
The bidding procedure and timeline for the 2019 AFC Asian Cup was approved at the AFC congress on 28 November 2012. The winning bid was originally set to be announced at an AFC congress in June, then November 2014. However, at its 60th anniversary celebrations at the end of 2014, AFC gave the date of 'summer 2015' to when an announcement would be made.

In January 2015, AFC general secretary Alex Soosay said that Iran and the United Arab Emirates were the only two remaining bidders for the 2019 Asian Cup, and that the eventual hosts would be announced in March 2015.

On 9 March 2015, during an AFC Executive Committee meeting in Manama, Bahrain, the United Arab Emirates was announced as the host. This was the second time the country hosted the tournament, after the 1996 edition.

== Teams ==
=== Qualification ===
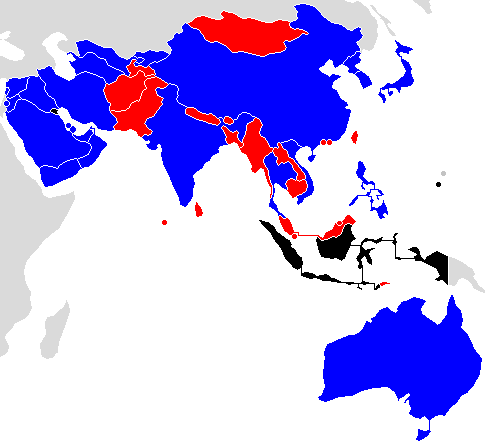
Qualified for Asian Cup Failed to qualify Disqualified or withdrew Not an AFC member

The 2019 AFC Asian Cup qualification process determined the 24 participating teams for the tournament. In 2014, a proposal to merge the preliminary qualification rounds of the FIFA World Cup with those of the AFC Asian Cup was ratified by the AFC Competitions Committee. The new qualification structure took place in three stages, with the first two merging with the 2018 FIFA World Cup qualification In the first round, the lowest ranked teams played home-and-away over two legs to reduce the total number of teams to 40. In the second round, the 40 teams were divided into eight groups of five to play home-and-away round-robin matches, where the eight group winners and the four best group runners-up qualified for the 2019 AFC Asian Cup finals. In the third round, the next best 24 teams eliminated from second round were divided into six groups of four and competed for the remaining slots of the 2019 AFC Asian Cup. The first qualifying round of the qualification took place on 12 March 2015, and the final match of the third round took place on 27 March 2018.

=== Qualified teams ===
India, Syria, Thailand, and Turkmenistan qualified for the tournament after being absent in several Asian Cup tournaments spanning from 2004 to 2015. Lebanon and Vietnam both qualified for the first time after hosting the tournaments, in 2000 and 2007 respectively. For Vietnam, this was the first time they qualified for the AFC Asian Cup as a unified nation, having participated as South Vietnam in the first two editions (1956 and 1960), outside of hosting the 2007 edition. This was also the first time Yemen qualified for the AFC Asian Cup as a unified country, due to FIFA and AFC categorizing the participation of South Yemen in the 1976 as a distinct record not related to Yemen, who succeeded North Yemen. In addition to Yemen, Kyrgyzstan and the Philippines also marked this edition as their first times to qualify for an Asian Cup.

Iran qualified for the Asian Cup for the first time as a CAFA member, having qualified as part of the WAFF before. Afghanistan, along with its fellow CAFA member nation Tajikistan, were the only two countries from the Central Asian zone which failed to qualify for the tournament. Indonesia and Malaysia were the only co-hosts of the 2007 edition that did not qualify for the Asian Cup, as Indonesia was barred from entering the qualification due to tension inside the PSSI which led to FIFA suspension; while Malaysia had ended their campaign in disaster with just one point out of six matches. Kuwait was the only West Asian team not to qualify for the Asian Cup, as they were also barred from completing the qualification due to FIFA's sanction. India remained as the only South Asian team to qualify for the tournament. On 13 November 2018, the Asian Football Confederation warned the Iranian government to stop meddling in the country's football association, otherwise, it would have faced sanctions before the Asian Cup.

The following 24 teams qualified for the final tournament:

| Team | Method of qualification | Date of qualification | Finals appearance | Last appearance | Previous best performance | December 2018 FIFA ranking |
|---|---|---|---|---|---|---|
| United Arab Emirates | Hosts | 9 March 2015 | 10th | 2015 | Runners-up (1996) | 79 |
| Qatar | Second round Group C winners | 17 November 2015 | 10th | 2015 | Quarter-finals (2000, 2011) | 93 |
| South Korea | Second round Group G winners | 13 January 2016 | 14th | 2015 | Winners (1956, 1960) | 53 |
| Japan | Second round Group E winners | 24 March 2016 | 9th | 2015 | Winners (1992, 2000, 2004, 2011) | 50 |
| Thailand | Second round Group F winners | 24 March 2016 | 7th | 2007 | Third place (1972) | 118 |
| Saudi Arabia | Second round Group A winners | 24 March 2016 | 10th | 2015 | Winners (1984, 1988, 1996) | 69 |
| Australia | Second round Group B winners | 29 March 2016 | 4th | 2015 | Winners (2015) | 41 |
| Uzbekistan | Second round Group H winners | 29 March 2016 | 7th | 2015 | Fourth place (2011) | 95 |
| Iran | Second round Group D winners | 29 March 2016 | 14th | 2015 | Winners (1968, 1972, 1976) | 29 |
| Syria | Second round Group E runners-up | 29 March 2016 | 6th | 2011 | Group stage (1980, 1984, 1988, 1996, 2011) | 74 |
| Iraq | Second round Group F runners-up | 29 March 2016 | 9th | 2015 | Winners (2007) | 88 |
| China | Second round Group C runners-up | 29 March 2016 | 12th | 2015 | Runners-up (1984, 2004) | 76 |
| Palestine | Third round Group D runners-up | 10 October 2017 | 2nd | 2015 | Group stage (2015) | 99 |
| Oman | Third round Group D winners | 10 October 2017 | 4th | 2015 | Group stage (2004, 2007, 2015) | 82 |
| India | Third round Group A winners | 11 October 2017 | 4th | 2011 | Runners-up (1964) | 97 |
| Lebanon | Third round Group B winners | 10 November 2017 | 2nd | 2000 | Group stage (2000) | 81 |
| Turkmenistan | Third round Group E runners-up | 14 November 2017 | 2nd | 2004 | Group stage (2004) | 127 |
| Jordan | Third round Group C winners | 14 November 2017 | 4th | 2015 | Quarter-finals (2004, 2011) | 109 |
| Bahrain | Third round Group E winners | 14 November 2017 | 6th | 2015 | Fourth place (2004) | 113 |
| Vietnam | Third round Group C runners-up | 14 November 2017 | 4th | 2007 | Fourth place (1956^{1}, 1960^{1}) | 100 |
| Kyrgyzstan | Third round Group A runners-up | 22 March 2018 | 1st | Debut | None | 91 |
| North Korea | Third round Group B runners-up | 27 March 2018 | 5th | 2015 | Fourth place (1980) | 109 |
| Philippines | Third round Group F winners | 27 March 2018 | 1st | Debut | None | 116 |
| Yemen | Third round Group F runners-up | 27 March 2018 | 1st^{2} | Debut | None | 135 |

^{1} As South Vietnam
^{2} Yemen once qualified for the 1976 AFC Asian Cup as South Yemen, but according to FIFA and the AFC, the previous records of Yemen are registered as North Yemen instead.

=== Draw ===
Burj Khalifa, the location of the final draw

The draw of the final tournament was held on 4 May 2018, 19:30 GST, at the Armani Hotel in the Burj Khalifa in Dubai. The FIFA rankings of April 2018 were used as basis for the seeding. The 12 teams that secured their place in the final tournament by the end of the second round of the qualification process were placed in Pots 1 and 2 while the remaining teams which qualified during the third round were allocated to the remaining pots. As hosts, the United Arab Emirates were seeded into Pot 1. The 24 teams were drawn into six groups of four teams, with the hosts placed in position A1. Four renowned Asian players: Ali Daei, Sun Jihai, Sunil Chhetri, and Phil Younghusband were chosen to draw the teams.

| Pot 1 | Pot 2 | Pot 3 | Pot 4 |
|---|---|---|---|
| United Arab Emirates (81) (hosts); Iran (36); Australia (40); Japan (60); South Korea (61); Saudi Arabia (70) | China (73); Syria (76); Uzbekistan (88); Iraq (88); Qatar (101); Thailand (122) | Kyrgyzstan (75); Lebanon (82); Palestine (83); Oman (87); India (97); Vietnam (103) | North Korea (112); Philippines (113); Bahrain (116); Jordan (117); Yemen (125); Turkmenistan (129) |

==== Draw result ====
Teams were drawn consecutively into Group A to F. Teams from each pot were assigned to the positions of their groups following by number orders of group stage, for example Pot 1 team were assigned to A1, and continued.

The draw resulted in the following groups:

Group A
| Pos | Team |
|---|---|
| A1 | United Arab Emirates |
| A2 | Thailand |
| A3 | India |
| A4 | Bahrain |

Group B
| Pos | Team |
|---|---|
| B1 | Australia |
| B2 | Syria |
| B3 | Palestine |
| B4 | Jordan |

Group C
| Pos | Team |
|---|---|
| C1 | South Korea |
| C2 | China |
| C3 | Kyrgyzstan |
| C4 | Philippines |

Group D
| Pos | Team |
|---|---|
| D1 | Iran |
| D2 | Iraq |
| D3 | Vietnam |
| D4 | Yemen |

Group E
| Pos | Team |
|---|---|
| E1 | Saudi Arabia |
| E2 | Qatar |
| E3 | Lebanon |
| E4 | North Korea |

Group F
| Pos | Team |
|---|---|
| F1 | Japan |
| F2 | Uzbekistan |
| F3 | Oman |
| F4 | Turkmenistan |

=== Squads ===
Each team had to register a squad with a minimum of 18 players and a maximum of 23 players, at least three of whom must be goalkeepers.

== Match officials ==
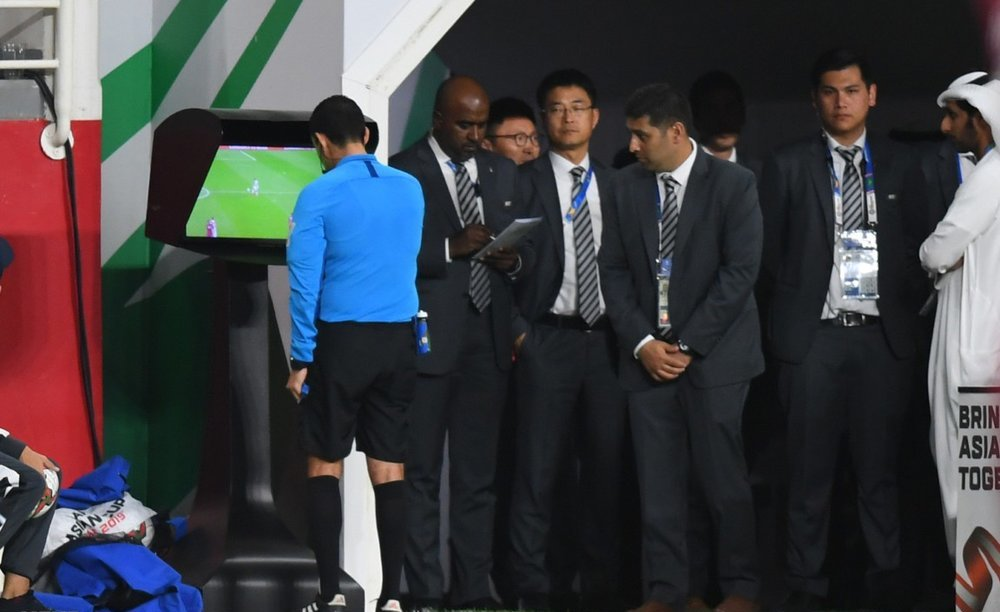
Mexican referee César Ramos consulting the video assistant referee system in the semi-final match between Qatar and the UAE.

On 5 December 2018, the AFC announced the list of 30 referees, 30 assistant referees, two stand-by referees and two stand-by assistant referees, including one referee and two assistant referees from CONCACAF for the tournament. Video assistant referees (VAR) would be used from the quarter-finals onwards. In each match, the referee and his assistants were accompanied by two additional assistant referees stationed next to each team's goalpost.

Referees

- (Australia) Chris Beath
- (Australia) Peter Green
- (Bahrain) Nawaf Shukralla
- (China) Fu Ming
- (China) Ma Ning
- (Hong Kong) Liu Kwok Man
- (Iran) Alireza Faghani
- (Iraq) Ali Sabah
- (Iraq) Mohanad Qasim Sarray
- (Japan) Jumpei Iida
- (Japan) Hiroyuki Kimura
- (Japan) Ryuji Sato
- (Jordan) Ahmed Faisal Al-Ali
- (Jordan) Adham Makhadmeh
- (South Korea) Kim Dong-jin
- (South Korea) Ko Hyung-jin
- (Malaysia) Mohd Amirul Izwan Yaacob
- (Mexico) César Ramos
- (Oman) Ahmed Al-Kaf
- (Qatar) Abdulrahman Al-Jassim
- (Qatar) Khamis Al-Kuwari
- (Qatar) Khamis Al-Marri
- (Saudi Arabia) Turki Al-Khudhayr
- (Singapore) Muhammad Taqi
- (Sri Lanka) Hettikamkanamge Perera
- (United Arab Emirates) Ammar Al-Jeneibi
- (United Arab Emirates) Mohammed Abdulla Hassan Mohamed
- (Uzbekistan) Ravshan Irmatov
- (Uzbekistan) Valentin Kovalenko
- (Uzbekistan) Ilgiz Tantashev

Assistant referees

- (Australia) Matthew Cream
- (Australia) Anton Shchetinin
- (Bahrain) Mohamed Salman
- (Bahrain) Yaser Tulefat
- (China) Cao Yi
- (China) Huo Weiming
- (Iran) Mohammadreza Mansouri
- (Iran) Reza Sokhandan
- (Japan) Jun Mihara
- (Japan) Hiroshi Yamauchi
- (Jordan) Mohammad Al-Kalaf
- (Jordan) Ahmad Al-Roalleh
- (South Korea) Park Sang-jun
- (South Korea) Yoon Kwang-yeol
- (Kyrgyzstan) Sergei Grishchenko
- (Malaysia) Mohd Yusri Muhamad
- (Malaysia) Mohd Zainal Abidin
- (Mexico) Miguel Hernández
- (Mexico) Alberto Morín
- (Oman) Abu Bakar Al-Amri
- (Oman) Rashid Al-Ghaithi
- (Qatar) Saud Al-Maqaleh
- (Qatar) Taleb Al-Marri
- (Saudi Arabia) Mohammed Al-Bakri
- (Singapore) Ronnie Koh Min Kiat
- (Sri Lanka) Palitha Hemathunga
- (United Arab Emirates) Mohamed Al-Hammadi
- (United Arab Emirates) Hasan Al-Mahri
- (Uzbekistan) Abdukhamidullo Rasulov
- (Uzbekistan) Jakhongir Saidov

Video assistant referees

- (Italy) Paolo Valeri
- (Netherlands) Danny Makkelie

Stand-by referees

- (Sri Lanka) Nivon Robesh Gamini
- (Syria) Hanna Hattab

Stand-by assistant referees

- (Iraq) Ali Ubaydee
- (Sri Lanka) Priyanga Palliya Guruge

== Venues ==
After being awarded the bid, initially the UAE chose six stadiums to host the tournament. The six stadiums were Zayed Sports City Stadium and Mohammed Bin Zayed Stadium in Abu Dhabi, Hazza Bin Zayed Stadium and Khalifa bin Zayed Stadium in Al Ain, and Dubai's Al Ahli Stadium and DSC Stadium. Later, two stadiums in Dubai were dropped due to financial problems and were replaced by Al Maktoum Stadium and Rashid Stadium, which were also located in Dubai.

After the 2015 Asian Cup, the AFC agreed to increase the number of teams from 16 to 24, following the UEFA Euro 2016. Hence, more stadiums were about to be chosen and rebuilt, in which Sharjah and Abu Dhabi won the rights to have more stadiums for the tournament. Sharjah Stadium and Al Nahyan Stadium were chosen aftermath, finalized the number of stadium to eight.

The eight venues used are Zayed Sports City Stadium, Mohammed Bin Zayed Stadium, and Al Nahyan Stadium in Abu Dhabi, Hazza Bin Zayed Stadium and Khalifa Bin Zayed Stadium in Al Ain, Al Maktoum Stadium and Rashid Stadium in Dubai, and Sharjah Stadium in Sharjah.

Abu Dhabi
| Zayed Sports City Stadium | Mohammed bin Zayed Stadium | Al Nahyan Stadium |
| Capacity: 43,206 | Capacity: 36,186 | Capacity: 15,894 |
| Dubai | Location of the host cities of the 2019 AFC Asian Cup. | |
| Rashid Stadium | Location of the host cities of the 2019 AFC Asian Cup. | |
| Capacity: 12,052 | Location of the host cities of the 2019 AFC Asian Cup. | |
| Dubai | Location of the host cities of the 2019 AFC Asian Cup. | |
| Al Maktoum Stadium | Location of the host cities of the 2019 AFC Asian Cup. | |
| Capacity: 15,058 | Location of the host cities of the 2019 AFC Asian Cup. | |
| Al Ain | | Sharjah |
| Hazza bin Zayed Stadium | Khalifa bin Zayed Stadium | Sharjah Stadium |
| Capacity: 25,053 | Capacity: 12,000 | Capacity: 12,499 |

== Format ==
The tournament was expanded to 24 teams from the previous format of 16 teams, which had been used since 2004. Only the hosts will receive an automatic qualification spot, while the other 23 teams will qualify through a qualification tournament. At the finals, the 24 teams will be drawn into six groups of four teams each. The teams in each group play a single round robin. After the group stage, the top two teams and the four best third teams will advance to the knockout stage, beginning with the round of 16. For the first time since a knockout stage was added to the competition in 1972, there will be no third place play-off.

== Schedule ==
The AFC announced the official match schedule on 7 May 2018. Zayed Sports City Stadium, one of three stadiums in Abu Dhabi, staged both the opening match and the final. At least five matches were allocated to each venue, with every ground hosting at least one match in the knockout stage. The semi-finals were played on different days in Abu Dhabi and Dubai. No city hosted two matches on the same day – except in the final round of group stage matches when simultaneous kick-off is required.

== Group stage ==
The top two teams of each group and the four best third-placed teams advanced to the round of 16.

All times are local, GST (UTC+4).

=== Tiebreakers ===
Teams were ranked according to points (3 points for a win, 1 point for a draw, 0 points for a loss), and if tied on points, the following tiebreaking criteria were applied, in the order given, to determine the rankings:

1. Points in head-to-head matches among tied teams;
2. Goal difference in head-to-head matches among tied teams;
3. Goals scored in head-to-head matches among tied teams;
4. If more than two teams were tied, and after applying all head-to-head criteria above, a subset of teams were still tied, all head-to-head criteria above were reapplied exclusively to this subset of teams;
5. Goal difference in all group matches;
6. Goals scored in all group matches;
7. Penalty shoot-out if only two teams were tied and they met in the last round of the group;
8. Disciplinary points (yellow card = 1 point, red card as a result of two yellow cards = 3 points, direct red card = 3 points, yellow card followed by direct red card = 4 points);
9. Drawing of lots.

=== Group A ===
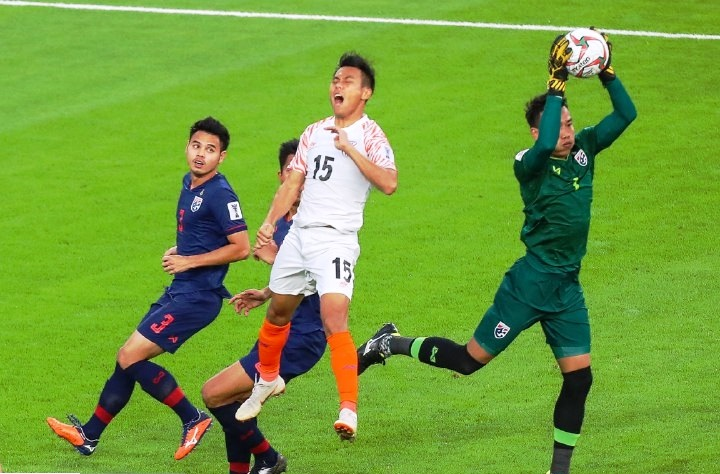
India's Udanta Singh with Thailand's Theerathon Bunmathan and Chatchai Budprom

Group A saw the opening match of the tournament which was a one-all draw between United Arab Emirates and Bahrain, with Ahmed Khalil getting the equaliser in the 88th minute after going one goal down only ten minutes prior. UAE and Thailand qualified as the top two nations in the group after a 1–1 draw at the Hazza bin Zayed Stadium, and Bahrain qualified in third place after a 1–0 win over India. India finished last in the group after they recorded their first win in the Asian Cup for 55 years over Thailand in their opening match, before losing their remaining two games.

| Pos | Team | Pld | W | D | L | GF | GA | GD | Pts | Qualification |
|---|---|---|---|---|---|---|---|---|---|---|
| 1 | United Arab Emirates (H) | 3 | 1 | 2 | 0 | 4 | 2 | +2 | 5 | Advance to knockout stage |
| 2 | Thailand | 3 | 1 | 1 | 1 | 3 | 5 | −2 | 4 (Note: Head-to-head points: Thailand 3, Bahrain 0.) | Advance to knockout stage |
| 3 | Bahrain | 3 | 1 | 1 | 1 | 2 | 2 | 0 | 4 | Advance to knockout stage |
| 4 | India | 3 | 1 | 0 | 2 | 4 | 4 | 0 | 3 | |

Source: AFC
(H) Hosts
Notes:
5 January 2019
20:00

| United Arab Emirates | 1–1 | Bahrain |
|---|---|---|
| Khalil 88' (pen.) | Report | Al Romaihi 78' |

Zayed Sports City Stadium, Abu Dhabi
Attendance: 33,878
Referee: Adham Makhadmeh (Jordan)
6 January 2019
17:30

| Thailand | 1–4 | India |
|---|---|---|
| Teerasil 33' | Report | Chhetri 27' (pen.), 46'; Thapa 68'; Lalpekhlua 80' |

Al Nahyan Stadium, Abu Dhabi
Attendance: 3,250
Referee: Liu Kwok Man (Hong Kong)

10 January 2019
15:00

| Bahrain | 0–1 | Thailand |
|---|---|---|
| | Report | Chanathip 58' |

Al Maktoum Stadium, Dubai
Attendance: 2,720
Referee: Chris Beath (Australia)
10 January 2019
20:00

| India | 0–2 | United Arab Emirates |
|---|---|---|
| | Report | Khalf. Mubarak 41'; Mabkhout 88' |

Zayed Sports City Stadium, Abu Dhabi
Attendance: 43,206
Referee: César Ramos (Mexico)

14 January 2019
20:00

| United Arab Emirates | 1–1 | Thailand |
|---|---|---|
| Mabkhout 7' | Report | Thitipan 41' |

Hazza bin Zayed Stadium, Al Ain
Attendance: 17,809
Referee: Ryuji Sato (Japan)
14 January 2019
20:00

| India | 0–1 | Bahrain |
|---|---|---|
| | Report | Rashid 90+1' (pen.) |

Sharjah Stadium, Sharjah
Attendance: 11,417
Referee: Ilgiz Tantashev (Uzbekistan)

=== Group B ===
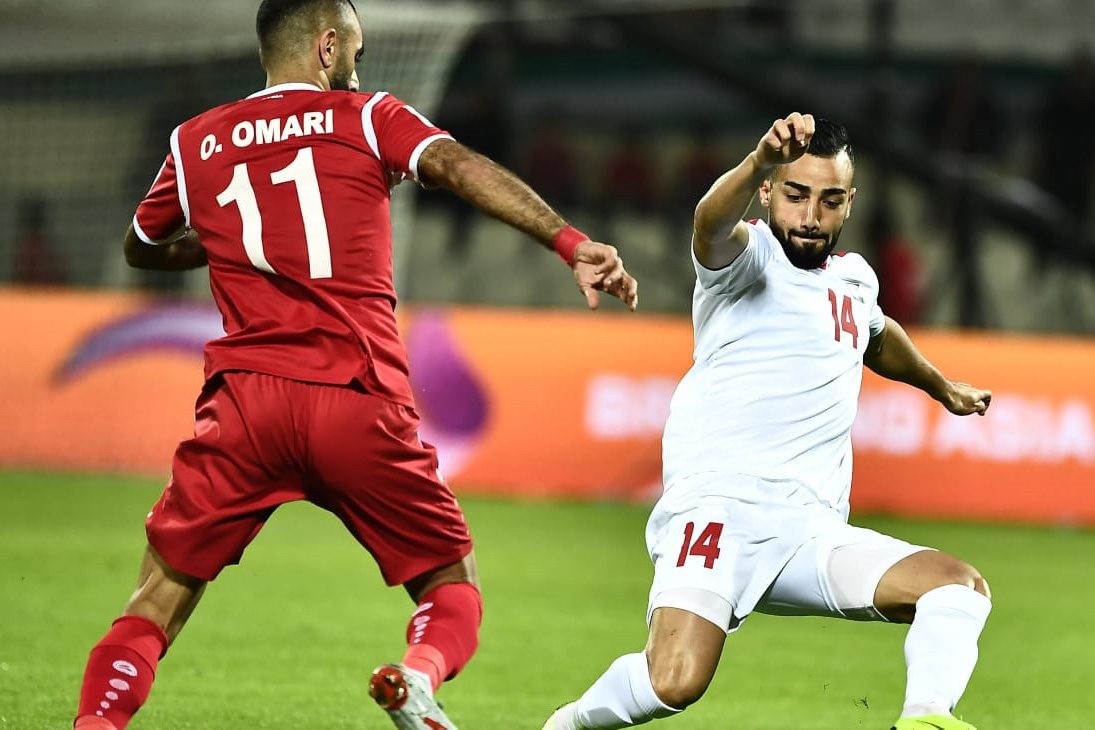
Syria's Osama Omari battling for the ball with Palestine's Abdullah Jaber

Group B saw Jordan qualify on top of the group after defeating the defending champions in the opening match from an Anas Bani Yaseen header. This was followed up by a 2–0 win over Syria which saw Syrian manager Bernd Stange sacked after the match and being replaced by Fajr Ibrahim. Joining them in the round of 16 was Australia, who after losing to Jordan in their opening match, got two wins over Palestine and Syria with that match only being won by a goal from Tom Rogic in injury time.

| Pos | Team | Pld | W | D | L | GF | GA | GD | Pts | Qualification |
|---|---|---|---|---|---|---|---|---|---|---|
| 1 | Jordan | 3 | 2 | 1 | 0 | 3 | 0 | +3 | 7 | Advance to knockout stage |
| 2 | Australia | 3 | 2 | 0 | 1 | 6 | 3 | +3 | 6 | Advance to knockout stage |
| 3 | Palestine | 3 | 0 | 2 | 1 | 0 | 3 | −3 | 2 | |
| 4 | Syria | 3 | 0 | 1 | 2 | 2 | 5 | −3 | 1 | |

Source: AFC
6 January 2019
15:00

| Australia | 0–1 | Jordan |
|---|---|---|
| | Report | Bani Yaseen 26' |

Hazza bin Zayed Stadium, Al Ain
Attendance: 4,934
Referee: Ahmed Al-Kaf (Oman)
6 January 2019
20:00

| Syria | 0–0 | Palestine |
|---|---|---|
| | Report |

Sharjah Stadium, Sharjah
Attendance: 8,471
Referee: Ravshan Irmatov (Uzbekistan)

10 January 2019
17:30

| Jordan | 2–0 | Syria |
|---|---|---|
| Al-Taamari 26'; Khattab 43' | Report |

Khalifa bin Zayed Stadium, Al Ain
Attendance: 9,152
Referee: Kim Dong-jin (South Korea)
11 January 2019
15:00

| Palestine | 0–3 | Australia |
|---|---|---|
| | Report | Maclaren 18'; Mabil 20'; Giannou 90' |

Rashid Stadium, Dubai
Attendance: 11,915
Referee: Valentin Kovalenko (Uzbekistan)

15 January 2019
17:30

| Australia | 3–2 | Syria |
|---|---|---|
| Mabil 41'; Ikonomidis 54'; Rogic 90+3' | Report | Khribin 43'; Al Somah 80' (pen.) |

Khalifa bin Zayed Stadium, Al Ain
Attendance: 10,492
Referee: César Ramos (Mexico)
15 January 2019
17:30

| Palestine | 0–0 | Jordan |
|---|---|---|
| | Report |

Mohammed bin Zayed Stadium, Abu Dhabi
Attendance: 20,843
Referee: Mohanad Qassim (Iraq)

=== Group C ===
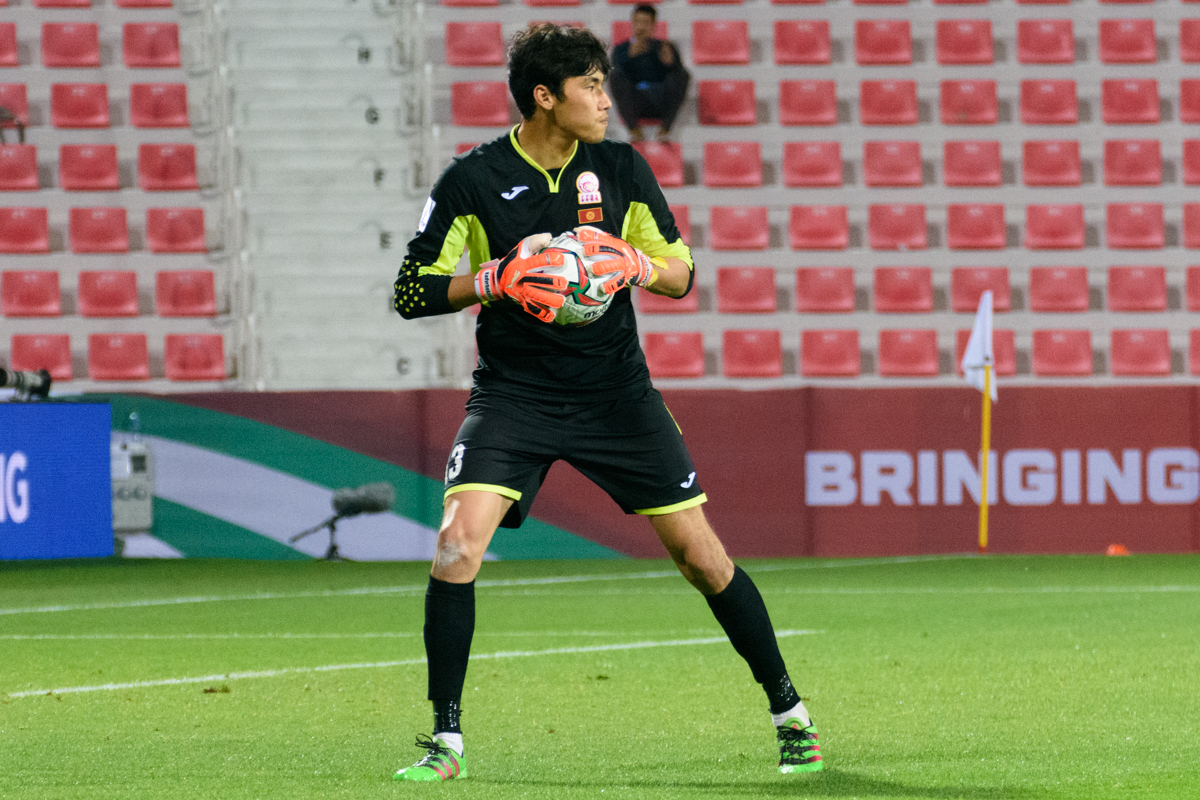
Kyrgyz goalkeeper Kutman Kadyrbekov in action against the Philippines

Group C saw South Korea and China qualify through as the top two seeds with the game between the two matches seeing South Korea on top of the group after a 2–0 win. This meant that South Korea finished without conceding a goal after previously getting two 1–0 wins over the Philippines and Kyrgyzstan. In the battle for third place, it was between two newcomers to the competition, with Kyrgyzstan getting their first win in an Asian competition with a hat-trick from Vitalij Lux, securing a 3–1 win for the central Asian team despite a late consolation goal from Stephan Schröck, which was the first Philippine goal in the tournament.

| Pos | Team | Pld | W | D | L | GF | GA | GD | Pts | Qualification |
|---|---|---|---|---|---|---|---|---|---|---|
| 1 | South Korea | 3 | 3 | 0 | 0 | 4 | 0 | +4 | 9 | Advance to knockout stage |
| 2 | China | 3 | 2 | 0 | 1 | 5 | 3 | +2 | 6 | Advance to knockout stage |
| 3 | Kyrgyzstan | 3 | 1 | 0 | 2 | 4 | 4 | 0 | 3 | Advance to knockout stage |
| 4 | Philippines | 3 | 0 | 0 | 3 | 1 | 7 | −6 | 0 | |

Source: AFC
7 January 2019
15:00

| China | 2–1 | Kyrgyzstan |
|---|---|---|
| Matyash 50' (o.g.); Yu Dabao 78' | Report | Israilov 42' |

Khalifa bin Zayed Stadium, Al Ain
Attendance: 1,839
Referee: Mohammed Abdulla Hassan Mohamed (United Arab Emirates)
7 January 2019
17:30

| South Korea | 1–0 | Philippines |
|---|---|---|
| Hwang Ui-jo 67' | Report |

Al Maktoum Stadium, Dubai
Attendance: 3,185
Referee: Nawaf Shukralla (Bahrain)

11 January 2019
17:30

| Philippines | 0–3 | China |
|---|---|---|
| | Report | Wu Lei 40', 66'; Yu Dabao 80' |

Mohammed bin Zayed Stadium, Abu Dhabi
Attendance: 16,013
Referee: Hiroyuki Kimura (Japan)
11 January 2019
20:00

| Kyrgyzstan | 0–1 | South Korea |
|---|---|---|
| | Report | Kim Min-jae 41' |

Hazza bin Zayed Stadium, Al Ain
Attendance: 4,893
Referee: Khamis Al-Marri (Qatar)

16 January 2019
17:30

| South Korea | 2–0 | China |
|---|---|---|
| Hwang Ui-jo 14' (pen.); Kim Min-jae 51' | Report |

Al Nahyan Stadium, Abu Dhabi
Attendance: 13,579
Referee: Abdulrahman Al-Jassim (Qatar)
16 January 2019
17:30

| Kyrgyzstan | 3–1 | Philippines |
|---|---|---|
| Lux 24', 51', 77' | Report | Schröck 80' |

Rashid Stadium, Dubai
Attendance: 4,217
Referee: Turki Al-Khudhayr (Saudi Arabia)

=== Group D ===
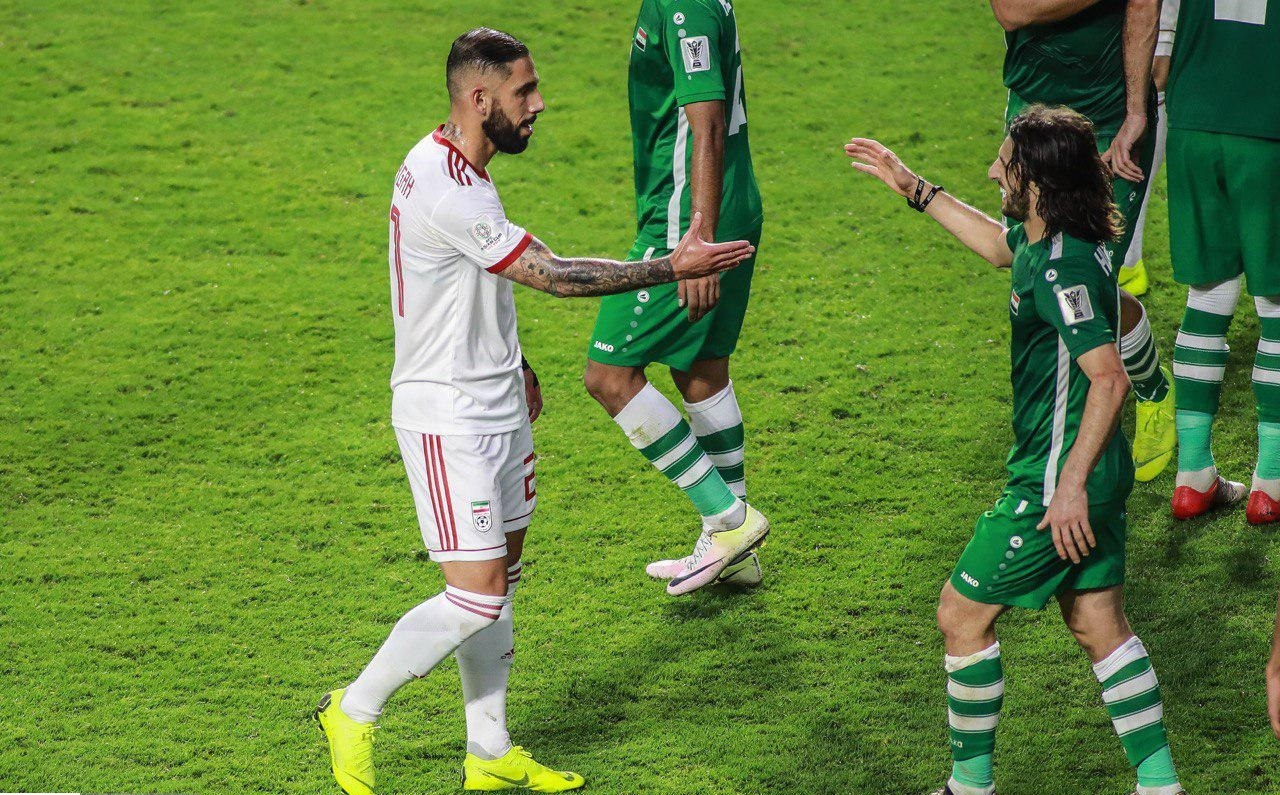
Iran's Ashkan Dejagah shaking hands with Iraq's Humam Tariq

Group D saw Iran and Iraq both qualify through to the round of 16 as the top two teams after both finished the group with seven points following their match finishing in a 0–0 draw at the Al Maktoum Stadium. Iran finished top of the group on goal difference, largely in part to their 5–0 defeat of debutantes Yemen in their first game, which included a double from Mehdi Taremi. A 2–0 win over Vietnam saw the team go through with three clean sheets from three. Iraq had a tougher game in their opener against Vietnam, with only a late 90th-minute goal from Ali Adnan securing them three points. This would later be followed with a 3–0 win over Yemen to qualify with Iran, with Vietnam qualifying in third place after a 2–0 victory over Yemen.

| Pos | Team | Pld | W | D | L | GF | GA | GD | Pts | Qualification |
|---|---|---|---|---|---|---|---|---|---|---|
| 1 | Iran | 3 | 2 | 1 | 0 | 7 | 0 | +7 | 7 | Advance to knockout stage |
| 2 | Iraq | 3 | 2 | 1 | 0 | 6 | 2 | +4 | 7 | Advance to knockout stage |
| 3 | Vietnam | 3 | 1 | 0 | 2 | 4 | 5 | −1 | 3 | Advance to knockout stage |
| 4 | Yemen | 3 | 0 | 0 | 3 | 0 | 10 | −10 | 0 | |

Source: AFC
7 January 2019
20:00

| Iran | 5–0 | Yemen |
|---|---|---|
| Taremi 12', 25'; Dejagah 23'; Azmoun 53'; Ghoddos 78' | Report |

Mohammed bin Zayed Stadium, Abu Dhabi
Attendance: 5,301
Referee: Ryuji Sato (Japan)
8 January 2019
17:30

| Iraq | 3–2 | Vietnam |
|---|---|---|
| M. Ali 35'; Tariq 60'; Adnan 90' | Report | Faez 24' (o.g.); Nguyễn Công Phượng 42' |

Zayed Sports City Stadium, Abu Dhabi
Attendance: 4,779
Referee: Abdulrahman Al-Jassim (Qatar)

12 January 2019
15:00

| Vietnam | 0–2 | Iran |
|---|---|---|
| | Report | Azmoun 38', 69' |

Al Nahyan Stadium, Abu Dhabi
Attendance: 10,841
Referee: Muhammad Taqi (Singapore)
12 January 2019
17:30

| Yemen | 0–3 | Iraq |
|---|---|---|
| | Report | M. Ali 11'; Resan 19'; Abbas 90+1' |

Sharjah Stadium, Sharjah
Attendance: 9,757
Referee: Fu Ming (China PR)

16 January 2019
20:00

| Vietnam | 2–0 | Yemen |
|---|---|---|
| Nguyễn Quang Hải 38'; Quế Ngọc Hải 64' (pen.) | Report |

Hazza bin Zayed Stadium, Al Ain
Attendance: 8,237
Referee: Ahmed Al-Kaf (Oman)
16 January 2019
20:00

| Iran | 0–0 | Iraq |
|---|---|---|
| | Report |

Al Maktoum Stadium, Dubai
Attendance: 15,038
Referee: Ravshan Irmatov (Uzbekistan)

=== Group E ===
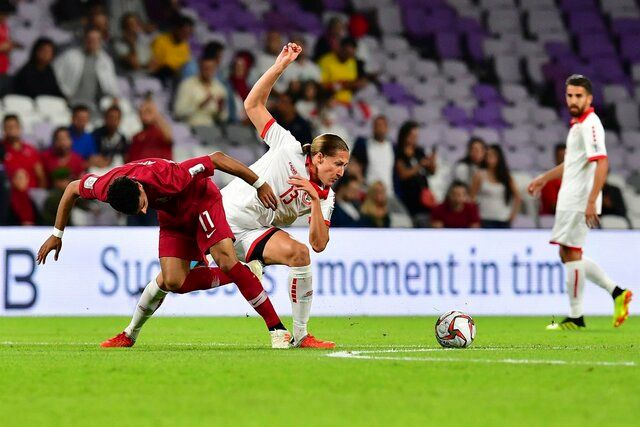
Lebanon's Felix Michel Melki challenging Qatar's Akram Afif

Group E witnessed Qatar and Saudi Arabia qualify for the round of 16. In the decisive match for first place, Qatar beat Saudi Arabia 2–0, thanks to a brace by Almoez Ali. Qatar began their campaign with a comfortable, albeit controversial, 2–0 win over Lebanon, before beating North Korea 6–0, sealing their place in the knockout stage. Ali was decisive in both games, scoring a goal against Lebanon, and four goals against North Korea. Meanwhile, Saudi Arabia opened their account with a 4–0 win over North Korea, before booking a place to the next round by beating Lebanon 2–0. In their last fixture, Lebanon beat North Korea 4–1 with a Hilal El-Helwe brace; the win was Lebanon's first in the competition. However, Lebanon missed out on the next round on fair play points.

| Pos | Team | Pld | W | D | L | GF | GA | GD | Pts | Qualification |
|---|---|---|---|---|---|---|---|---|---|---|
| 1 | Qatar | 3 | 3 | 0 | 0 | 10 | 0 | +10 | 9 | Advance to knockout stage |
| 2 | Saudi Arabia | 3 | 2 | 0 | 1 | 6 | 2 | +4 | 6 | Advance to knockout stage |
| 3 | Lebanon | 3 | 1 | 0 | 2 | 4 | 5 | −1 | 3 | |
| 4 | North Korea | 3 | 0 | 0 | 3 | 1 | 14 | −13 | 0 | |

Source: AFC
8 January 2019
20:00

| Saudi Arabia | 4–0 | North Korea |
|---|---|---|
| Bahebri 28'; Al-Fatil 37'; Al-Dawsari 70'; Al-Muwallad 87' | Report |

Rashid Stadium, Dubai
Attendance: 5,075
Referee: Peter Green (Australia)
9 January 2019
20:00

| Qatar | 2–0 | Lebanon |
|---|---|---|
| Al-Rawi 65'; Ali 79' | Report |

Hazza bin Zayed Stadium, Al Ain
Attendance: 7,847
Referee: Ma Ning (China PR)

12 January 2019
20:00

| Lebanon | 0–2 | Saudi Arabia |
|---|---|---|
| | Report | Al-Muwallad 12'; Al-Mogahwi 67' |

Al Maktoum Stadium, Dubai
Attendance: 13,792
Referee: Ali Sabah (Iraq)
13 January 2019
15:00

| North Korea | 0–6 | Qatar |
|---|---|---|
| | Report | Ali 9', 11', 55', 60'; Khoukhi 43'; A. Hassan 68' |

Khalifa bin Zayed Stadium, Al Ain
Attendance: 452
Referee: Hettikamkanamge Perera (Sri Lanka)

17 January 2019
20:00

| Saudi Arabia | 0–2 | Qatar |
|---|---|---|
| | Report | Ali 45+1', 80' |

Zayed Sports City Stadium, Abu Dhabi
Attendance: 16,067
Referee: Kim Dong-jin (South Korea)
17 January 2019
20:00

| Lebanon | 4–1 | North Korea |
|---|---|---|
| F. Michel Melki 27'; El-Helwe 65', 90+8'; Maatouk 80' (pen.) | Report | Pak Kwang-ryong 9' |

Sharjah Stadium, Sharjah
Attendance: 4,332
Referee: Chris Beath (Australia)

=== Group F ===
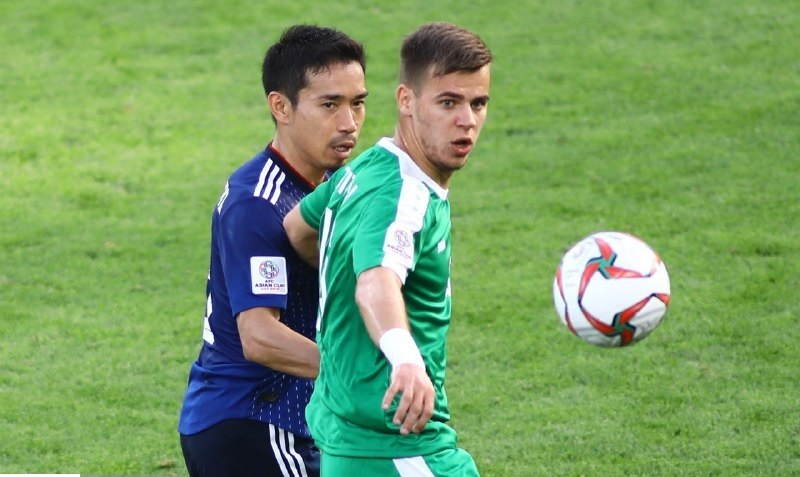
Japan's Yuto Nagatomo and Turkmenistan's Mihail Titow fighting for the ball

Group F saw Japan and Uzbekistan progressing to the round of 16, with Japan defeating Uzbekistan 2–1 to finish in first place. Japan began their campaign with a 3–2 victory over Turkmenistan, before beating Oman 1–0 to qualify for the knockout stage. Uzbekistan, on the other hand, beat Oman 2–1 thanks to an 85th-minute goal by Eldor Shomurodov, before beating their neighbors Turkmenistan 4–0. Oman qualified for the next round for the first time, after winning 3–1 over Turkmenistan, with Mohammed Al-Musalami scoring a goal in the injury time.

| Pos | Team | Pld | W | D | L | GF | GA | GD | Pts | Qualification |
|---|---|---|---|---|---|---|---|---|---|---|
| 1 | Japan | 3 | 3 | 0 | 0 | 6 | 3 | +3 | 9 | Advance to knockout stage |
| 2 | Uzbekistan | 3 | 2 | 0 | 1 | 7 | 3 | +4 | 6 | Advance to knockout stage |
| 3 | Oman | 3 | 1 | 0 | 2 | 4 | 4 | 0 | 3 | Advance to knockout stage |
| 4 | Turkmenistan | 3 | 0 | 0 | 3 | 3 | 10 | −7 | 0 | |

Source: AFC
9 January 2019
15:00

| Japan | 3–2 | Turkmenistan |
|---|---|---|
| Osako 56', 60'; Dōan 71' | Report | Amanow 26'; Ataýew 79' (pen.) |

Al Nahyan Stadium, Abu Dhabi
Attendance: 5,725
Referee: Alireza Faghani (Iran)
9 January 2019
17:30

| Uzbekistan | 2–1 | Oman |
|---|---|---|
| Ahmedov 34'; Shomurodov 85' | Report | Mu. Al-Ghassani 72' |

Sharjah Stadium, Sharjah
Attendance: 9,424
Referee: Ko Hyung-jin (South Korea)

13 January 2019
17:30

| Oman | 0–1 | Japan |
|---|---|---|
| | Report | Haraguchi 28' (pen.) |

Zayed Sports City Stadium, Abu Dhabi
Attendance: 12,110
Referee: Mohd Amirul Izwan Yaacob (Malaysia)
13 January 2019
20:00

| Turkmenistan | 0–4 | Uzbekistan |
|---|---|---|
| | Report | Sidikov 17'; Shomurodov 24', 42'; Masharipov 40' |

Rashid Stadium, Dubai
Attendance: 4,354
Referee: Ammar Al-Jeneibi (United Arab Emirates)

17 January 2019
17:30

| Oman | 3–1 | Turkmenistan |
|---|---|---|
| Al-Mahaijri 20'; Mu. Al-Ghassani 84'; Al-Musalami 90+3' | Report | Annadurdyýew 41' |

Mohammed bin Zayed Stadium, Abu Dhabi
Attendance: 8,338
Referee: Nawaf Shukralla (Bahrain)
17 January 2019
17:30

| Japan | 2–1 | Uzbekistan |
|---|---|---|
| Muto 43'; Shiotani 58' | Report | Shomurodov 40' |

Khalifa bin Zayed Stadium, Al Ain
Attendance: 7,005
Referee: Mohammed Abdulla Hassan Mohamed (United Arab Emirates)

=== Ranking of third-placed teams ===
| Pos | Grp | Team | Pld | W | D | L | GF | GA | GD | Pts | Qualification |
|---|---|---|---|---|---|---|---|---|---|---|---|
| 1 | A | Bahrain | 3 | 1 | 1 | 1 | 2 | 2 | 0 | 4 | Advance to knockout stage |
| 2 | C | Kyrgyzstan | 3 | 1 | 0 | 2 | 4 | 4 | 0 | 3 (Note: Disciplinary points: Kyrgyzstan −5, Oman −6.) | Advance to knockout stage |
| 3 | F | Oman | 3 | 1 | 0 | 2 | 4 | 4 | 0 | 3 | Advance to knockout stage |
| 4 | D | Vietnam | 3 | 1 | 0 | 2 | 4 | 5 | −1 | 3 (Note: Disciplinary points: Vietnam −5, Lebanon −7.) | Advance to knockout stage |
| 5 | E | Lebanon | 3 | 1 | 0 | 2 | 4 | 5 | −1 | 3 | |
| 6 | B | Palestine | 3 | 0 | 2 | 1 | 0 | 3 | −3 | 2 | |

Source: AFC
Rules for classification: 1) Points; 2) Goal difference; 3) Goals scored; 4) Disciplinary points; 5) Drawing of lots.

== Knockout stage ==
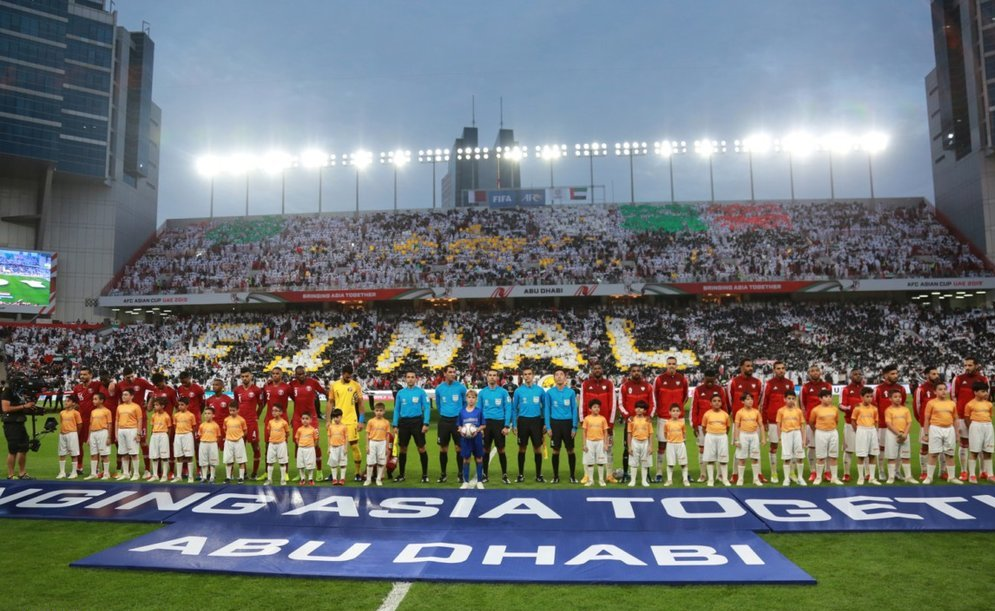
Player lineup prior to the Qatar v UAE kickoff

In the knockout stage, extra time and penalty shoot-out were used to decide the winner if necessary. A fourth substitution could be made during extra time.

=== Bracket ===
Round of 16
20 January – Al Ain (HBZ)
Thailand | 1
China | 2
20 January – Abu Dhabi (MBZ)
Iran | 2
Oman | 0
20 January – Dubai (Al Maktoum)
Jordan | 1 (2)
Vietnam (p) | 1 (4)
21 January – Sharjah
Japan | 1
Saudi Arabia | 0
22 January – Dubai (Rashid)
South Korea (a.e.t.) | 2
Bahrain | 1
22 January – Abu Dhabi (Al Nahyan)
Qatar | 1
Iraq | 0
21 January – Abu Dhabi (Zayed Sports)
United Arab Emirates (a.e.t.) | 3
Kyrgyzstan | 2
21 January – Al Ain (KBZ)
Australia (p) | 0 (4)
Uzbekistan | 0 (2)

Quarter-finals
24 January – Abu Dhabi (MBZ)
China | 0
Iran | 3
24 January – Dubai (Al Maktoum)
Vietnam | 0
Japan | 1
25 January – Abu Dhabi (Zayed Sports)
South Korea | 0
Qatar | 1
25 January – Al Ain (HBZ)
United Arab Emirates | 1
Australia | 0

Semi-finals
28 January – Al Ain (HBZ)
Iran | 0
Japan | 3
29 January – Abu Dhabi (MBZ)
Qatar | 4
United Arab Emirates | 0

Final
1 February – Abu Dhabi (Zayed Sports)
Japan | 1
Qatar | 3

=== Round of 16 ===
20 January 2019
15:00

| Jordan | 1–1 (a.e.t.) | Vietnam |
|---|---|---|
| Abdel-Rahman 39' | Report | Nguyễn Công Phượng 51' |
Penalties
| Abdel-Rahman (penalty scored); Faisal (penalty missed); Samir (penalty missed); Ersan (penalty scored) | 2–4 | (penalty scored) Quế Ngọc Hải; (penalty scored) Đỗ Hùng Dũng; (penalty scored) Lương Xuân Trường; (penalty missed) Trần Minh Vương; (penalty scored) Bùi Tiến Dũng |

Al Maktoum Stadium, Dubai
Attendance: 14,205
Referee: Alireza Faghani (Iran)

20 January 2019
18:00

| Thailand | 1–2 | China |
|---|---|---|
| Supachai 31' | Report | Xiao Zhi 67'; Gao Lin 71' (pen.) |

Hazza bin Zayed Stadium, Al Ain
Attendance: 8,026
Referee: Mohammed Abdulla Hassan Mohamed (United Arab Emirates)

20 January 2019
21:00

| Iran | 2–0 | Oman |
|---|---|---|
| Jahanbakhsh 32'; Dejagah 41' (pen.) | Report |

Mohammed bin Zayed Stadium, Abu Dhabi
Attendance: 31,945
Referee: César Ramos (Mexico)

21 January 2019
15:00

| Japan | 1–0 | Saudi Arabia |
|---|---|---|
| Tomiyasu 20' | Report |

Sharjah Stadium, Sharjah
Attendance: 6,832
Referee: Ravshan Irmatov (Uzbekistan)

21 January 2019
18:00

| Australia | 0–0 (a.e.t.) | Uzbekistan |
|---|---|---|
| | Report |
Penalties
| Milligan (penalty scored); Behich (penalty missed); Kruse (penalty scored); Giannou (penalty scored); Leckie (penalty scored) | 4–2 | (penalty scored) Shukurov; (penalty missed) Tukhtakhodjaev; (penalty scored) Alibaev; (penalty missed) Bikmaev |

Khalifa bin Zayed Stadium, Al Ain
Attendance: 6,809
Referee: Abdulrahman Al-Jassim (Qatar)

21 January 2019
21:00

| United Arab Emirates | 3–2 (a.e.t.) | Kyrgyzstan |
|---|---|---|
| Esmaeel 14'; Mabkhout 64'; Khalil 103' (pen.) | Report | Murzaev 26'; Rustamov 90+1' |

Zayed Sports City Stadium, Abu Dhabi
Attendance: 17,784
Referee: Fu Ming (China PR)

22 January 2019
17:00

| South Korea | 2–1 (a.e.t.) | Bahrain |
|---|---|---|
| Hwang Hee-chan 43'; Kim Jin-su 105+2' | Report | Al Romaihi 77' |

Rashid Stadium, Dubai
Attendance: 7,658
Referee: Ryuji Sato (Japan)

22 January 2019
20:00

| Qatar | 1–0 | Iraq |
|---|---|---|
| Al-Rawi 62' | Report |

Al Nahyan Stadium, Abu Dhabi
Attendance: 14,701
Referee: Muhammad Taqi (Singapore)

=== Quarter-finals ===
24 January 2019
17:00

| Vietnam | 0–1 | Japan |
|---|---|---|
| | Report | Dōan 57' (pen.) |

Al Maktoum Stadium, Dubai
Attendance: 8,954
Referee: Mohammed Abdulla Hassan Mohamed (United Arab Emirates)

24 January 2019
20:00

| China | 0–3 | Iran |
|---|---|---|
| | Report | Taremi 18'; Azmoun 31'; Ansarifard 90+1' |

Mohammed bin Zayed Stadium, Abu Dhabi
Attendance: 19,578
Referee: Abdulrahman Al-Jassim (Qatar)

25 January 2019
17:00

| South Korea | 0–1 | Qatar |
|---|---|---|
| | Report | Hatem 78' |

Zayed Sports City Stadium, Abu Dhabi
Attendance: 13,791
Referee: Ravshan Irmatov (Uzbekistan)

25 January 2019
20:00

| United Arab Emirates | 1–0 | Australia |
|---|---|---|
| Mabkhout 68' | Report |

Hazza bin Zayed Stadium, Al Ain
Attendance: 25,053
Referee: Ryuji Sato (Japan)

=== Semi-finals ===
28 January 2019
18:00

| Iran | 0–3 | Japan |
|---|---|---|
| | Report | Osako 56', 67' (pen.); Haraguchi 90+1' |

Hazza bin Zayed Stadium, Al Ain
Attendance: 23,262
Referee: Chris Beath (Australia)

29 January 2019
18:00

| Qatar | 4–0 | United Arab Emirates |
|---|---|---|
| Khoukhi 22'; Ali 37'; Al-Haydos 80'; Ismail 90+3' | Report |

Mohammed bin Zayed Stadium, Abu Dhabi
Attendance: 38,646
Referee: César Ramos (Mexico)

=== Final ===
1 February 2019
18:00

| Japan | 1–3 | Qatar |
|---|---|---|
| Minamino 69' | Report | Ali 12'; Hatem 27'; Afif 83' (pen.) |

Zayed Sports City Stadium, Abu Dhabi
Attendance: 36,776
Referee: Ravshan Irmatov (Uzbekistan)

== Statistics ==
=== Goalscorers ===
There were 130 goals scored in 51 matches, for an average of 2.55 goals per match.

9 goals

- (Qatar) Almoez Ali

4 goals

- (Iran) Sardar Azmoun
- (Japan) Yuya Osako
- (United Arab Emirates) Ali Mabkhout
- (Uzbekistan) Eldor Shomurodov

3 goals

- (Iran) Mehdi Taremi
- (Kyrgyzstan) Vitalij Lux

2 goals

- (Australia) Awer Mabil
- (Bahrain) Mohamed Al Romaihi
- (China) Wu Lei
- (China) Yu Dabao
- (India) Sunil Chhetri
- (Iran) Ashkan Dejagah
- (Iraq) Mohanad Ali
- (Japan) Ritsu Dōan
- (Japan) Genki Haraguchi
- (Lebanon) Hilal El-Helwe
- (Oman) Muhsen Al-Ghassani
- (Qatar) Abdulaziz Hatem
- (Qatar) Boualem Khoukhi
- (Qatar) Bassam Al-Rawi
- (Saudi Arabia) Fahad Al-Muwallad
- (South Korea) Hwang Ui-jo
- (South Korea) Kim Min-jae
- (United Arab Emirates) Ahmed Khalil
- (Vietnam) Nguyễn Công Phượng

1 goal

- (Australia) Apostolos Giannou
- (Australia) Chris Ikonomidis
- (Australia) Jamie Maclaren
- (Australia) Tom Rogic
- (Bahrain) Jamal Rashid
- (China) Gao Lin
- (China) Xiao Zhi
- (India) Jeje Lalpekhlua
- (India) Anirudh Thapa
- (Iran) Karim Ansarifard
- (Iran) Saman Ghoddos
- (Iran) Alireza Jahanbakhsh
- (Iraq) Alaa Abbas
- (Iraq) Ali Adnan
- (Iraq) Bashar Resan
- (Iraq) Humam Tariq
- (Japan) Takumi Minamino
- (Japan) Yoshinori Muto
- (Japan) Tsukasa Shiotani
- (Japan) Takehiro Tomiyasu
- (Jordan) Baha' Abdel-Rahman
- (Jordan) Anas Bani Yaseen
- (Jordan) Tareq Khattab
- (Jordan) Musa Al-Taamari
- (Kyrgyzstan) Akhlidin Israilov
- (Kyrgyzstan) Mirlan Murzaev
- (Kyrgyzstan) Tursunali Rustamov
- (Lebanon) Hassan Maatouk
- (Lebanon) Felix Michel Melki
- (North Korea) Pak Kwang-ryong
- (Oman) Ahmed Kano
- (Oman) Mohammed Al-Musalami
- (Philippines) Stephan Schröck
- (Qatar) Akram Afif
- (Qatar) Abdelkarim Hassan
- (Qatar) Hassan Al-Haydos
- (Qatar) Hamid Ismail
- (Saudi Arabia) Hattan Bahebri
- (Saudi Arabia) Salem Al-Dawsari
- (Saudi Arabia) Mohammed Al-Fatil
- (Saudi Arabia) Housain Al-Mogahwi
- (South Korea) Hwang Hee-chan
- (South Korea) Kim Jin-su
- (Syria) Omar Kharbin
- (Syria) Omar Al Somah
- (Thailand) Chanathip Songkrasin
- (Thailand) Supachai Jaided
- (Thailand) Teerasil Dangda
- (Thailand) Thitipan Puangchan
- (Turkmenistan) Arslanmyrat Amanow
- (Turkmenistan) Altymyrat Annadurdyýew
- (Turkmenistan) Ahmet Ataýew
- (United Arab Emirates) Khamis Esmaeel
- (United Arab Emirates) Khalfan Mubarak
- (Uzbekistan) Odil Ahmedov
- (Uzbekistan) Jaloliddin Masharipov
- (Uzbekistan) Javokhir Sidikov
- (Vietnam) Nguyễn Quang Hải
- (Vietnam) Quế Ngọc Hải

1 own goal

- (Iraq) Ali Faez (against Vietnam)
- (Kyrgyzstan) Pavel Matyash (against China)

=== Discipline ===
A player was automatically suspended for the next match for the following offences:

- Receiving a red card (red card suspensions could be extended for serious offences)
- Receiving two yellow cards in two matches; yellow cards expired after the completion of the quarter-finals (yellow card suspensions were not carried forward to any other future international matches)

The following suspensions were served during the tournament:

| Player(s) | Offence(s) | Suspension(s) |
|---|---|---|
| (China) Zheng Zhi | (red card) in Qualification vs Qatar (qualification; 5 September 2017) | Group C vs Kyrgyzstan (matchday 1; 7 January) |
| (Palestine) Mohammed Saleh | (yellow card) (yellow-red card) in Group B vs Syria (matchday 1; 6 January) | Group B vs Australia (matchday 2; 11 January) |
| (North Korea) Han Kwang-song | (yellow card) (yellow-red card) in Group E vs Saudi Arabia (matchday 1; 8 January) | Group E vs Qatar (matchday 2; 13 January) |
| (Uzbekistan) Egor Krimets | (red card) in Group F vs Oman (matchday 1; 9 January) | Group F vs Turkmenistan (matchday 2; 13 January) |
| (Thailand) Pansa Hemviboon | (yellow card) in Group A vs India (matchday 1; 6 January); (yellow card) in Group A vs Bahrain (matchday 2; 10 January) | Group A vs United Arab Emirates (matchday 3; 14 January) |
| (Jordan) Musa Al-Taamari | (yellow card) in Group B vs Australia (matchday 1; 6 January); (yellow card) in Group B vs Syria (matchday 2; 10 January) | Group B vs Palestine (matchday 3; 15 January) |
| (Australia) Trent Sainsbury | (yellow card) in Group B vs Jordan (matchday 1; 6 January); (yellow card) in Group B vs Palestine (matchday 2; 11 January) | Group B vs Syria (matchday 3; 15 January) |
| (Palestine) Jonathan Cantillana | (yellow card) in Group B vs Syria (matchday 1; 6 January); (yellow card) in Group B vs Australia (matchday 2; 11 January) | Group B vs Jordan (matchday 3; 15 January) |
| (South Korea) Lee Yong | (yellow card) in Group C vs Philippines (matchday 1; 7 January); (yellow card) in Group C vs Kyrgyzstan (matchday 2; 11 January) | Group C vs China PR (matchday 3; 16 January) |
| (Vietnam) Đỗ Duy Mạnh | (yellow card) in Group D vs Iraq (matchday 1; 8 January); (yellow card) in Group D vs Iran (matchday 2; 12 January) | Group D vs Yemen (matchday 3; 16 January) |
| (Saudi Arabia) Salem Al-Dawsari | (yellow card) in Group E vs North Korea (matchday 1; 8 January); (yellow card) in Group E vs Lebanon (matchday 2; 12 January) | Group E vs Qatar (matchday 3; 17 January) |
| (North Korea) Ri Il-jin | (yellow card) in Group E vs Saudi Arabia (matchday 1; 8 January); (yellow card) in Group E vs Qatar (matchday 2; 13 January) | Group E vs Lebanon (matchday 3; 17 January) |
| (North Korea) Jong Il-gwan | (yellow card) (yellow-red card) in Group E vs Qatar (matchday 2; 13 January) | Group E vs Lebanon (matchday 3; 17 January) |
| (Thailand) Adisorn Promrak (Thailand) Suphan Thongsong | (yellow card) in Group A vs Bahrain (matchday 2; 10 January); (yellow card) in Group A vs United Arab Emirates (matchday 3; 14 January) | Round of 16 vs China PR (20 January) |
| (China) Zhang Linpeng | (yellow card) in Group C vs South Korea (matchday 3; 16 January); (yellow card) in Round of 16 vs Thailand (20 January) | Quarter-final vs Iran (24 January) |
| (Iran) Vahid Amiri | (yellow card) in Group D vs Iraq (matchday 3; 16 January); (yellow card) in Round of 16 vs Oman (20 January) | Quarter-final vs China PR (24 January) |
| (Japan) Yoshinori Muto | (yellow card) in Group F vs Uzbekistan (matchday 3; 17 January); (yellow card) in Round of 16 vs Saudi Arabia (21 January) | Quarter-final vs Vietnam (24 January) |
| (Australia) Tom Rogic | (yellow card) in Group B vs Palestine (matchday 2; 11 January); (yellow card) in Round of 16 vs Uzbekistan (21 January) | Quarter-final vs United Arab Emirates (25 January) |
| (United Arab Emirates) Khamis Esmaeel | (yellow card) in Group A vs Bahrain (matchday 1; 5 January); (yellow card) in Round of 16 vs Kyrgyzstan (21 January) | Quarter-final vs Australia (25 January) |
| (Qatar) Abdelkarim Hassan | (yellow card) in Group E vs North Korea (matchday 2; 13 January); (yellow card) in Round of 16 vs Iraq (22 January) | Quarter-final vs South Korea (25 January) |
| (Qatar) Assim Madibo | (yellow card) in Group E vs Saudi Arabia (matchday 3; 17 January); (yellow card) in Round of 16 vs Iraq (22 January) | Quarter-final vs South Korea (25 January) |
| (Iran) Mehdi Taremi | (yellow card) in Group D vs Vietnam (matchday 2; 12 January); (yellow card) in Quarter-final vs China PR (24 January) | Semi-final vs Japan (28 January) |
| (Qatar) Abdulaziz Hatem | (yellow card) in Group E vs Saudi Arabia (matchday 3; 17 January); (yellow card) in Quarter-final vs South Korea (25 January) | Semi-final vs United Arab Emirates (29 January) |
| (Qatar) Bassam Al-Rawi | (yellow card) in Round of 16 vs Iraq (22 January); (yellow card) in Quarter-final vs South Korea (25 January) | Semi-final vs United Arab Emirates (29 January) |

=== Awards ===
Most Valuable Player

- (Qatar) Almoez Ali

Top Goalscorer

- (Qatar) Almoez Ali (9 goals)

Best Goalkeeper

- (Qatar) Saad Al-Sheeb

Fair Play Award

- Japan

Team of the tournament

According to the AFC organization committee, eight players from the winning Qatari team and five players from the runner-up Japanese team were selected in the team of the tournament. Six players from teams which progressed to the semi-finals (Iran and the United Arab Emirates) were also selected. In addition, four players from teams which progressed to the quarter-finals were selected.

| Goalkeepers | Defenders | Midfielders | Forwards |
|---|---|---|---|
| (Qatar) Saad Al Sheeb (Japan) Shūichi Gonda (Iran) Alireza Beiranvand | (Qatar) Abdelkarim Hassan (Qatar) Bassam Al-Rawi (Qatar) Boualem Khoukhi (Japan) Yuto Nagatomo (Japan) Maya Yoshida (United Arab Emirates) Bandar Al-Ahbabi (South Korea) Kim Min-jae | (Qatar) Abdulaziz Hatem (Qatar) Hassan Al-Haydos (Japan) Gaku Shibasaki (Iran) Ashkan Dejagah (Iran) Omid Ebrahimi (Australia) Tom Rogic | (Qatar) Almoez Ali (Qatar) Akram Afif (Japan) Yuya Osako (Iran) Sardar Azmoun (United Arab Emirates) Ali Mabkhout (China) Wu Lei (Vietnam) Nguyễn Quang Hải |

== Marketing ==
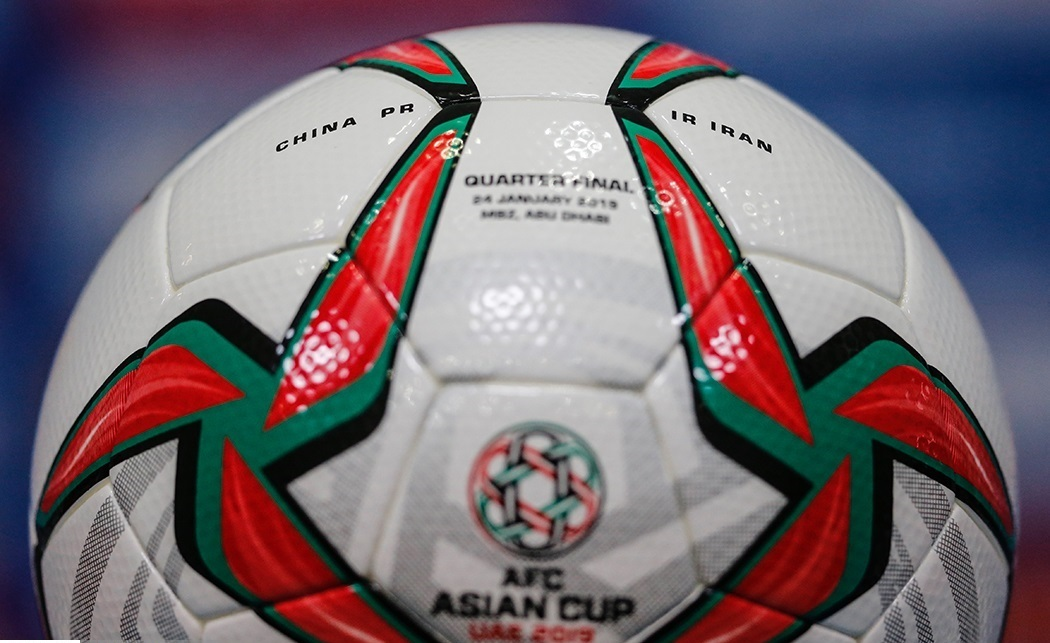
The Molten Acentec ball used at the tournament

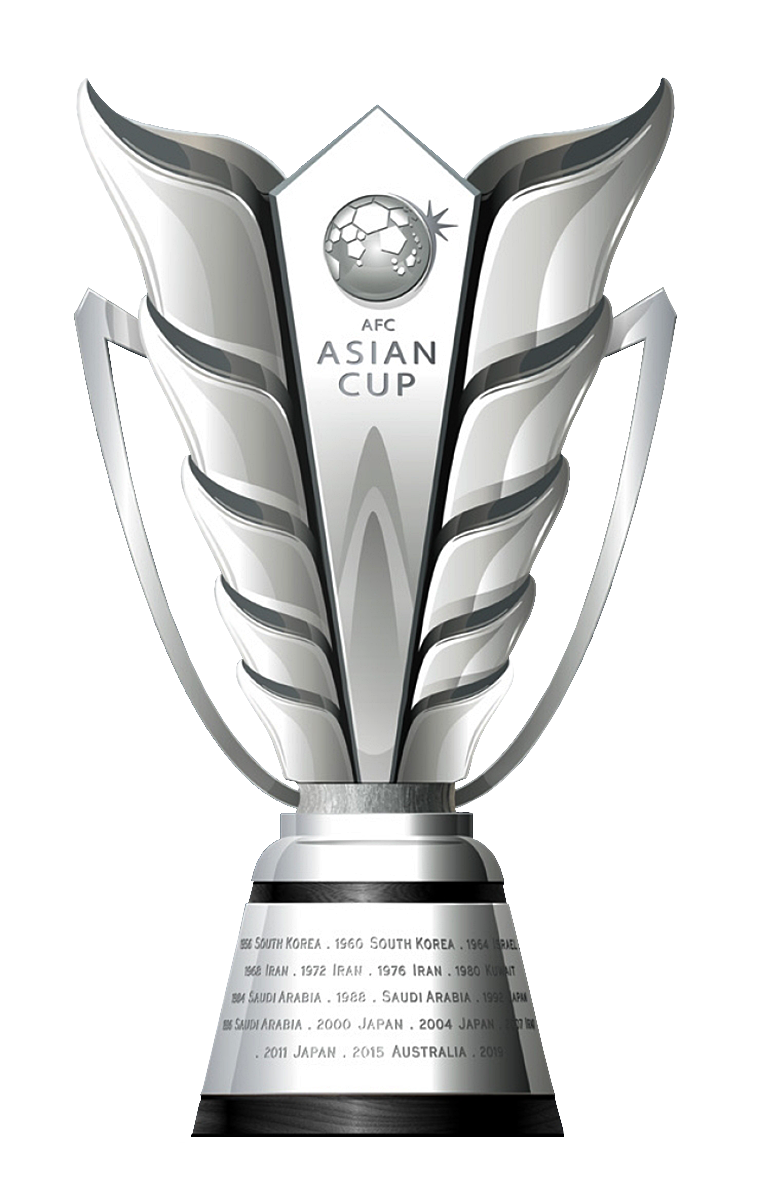
The new trophy design

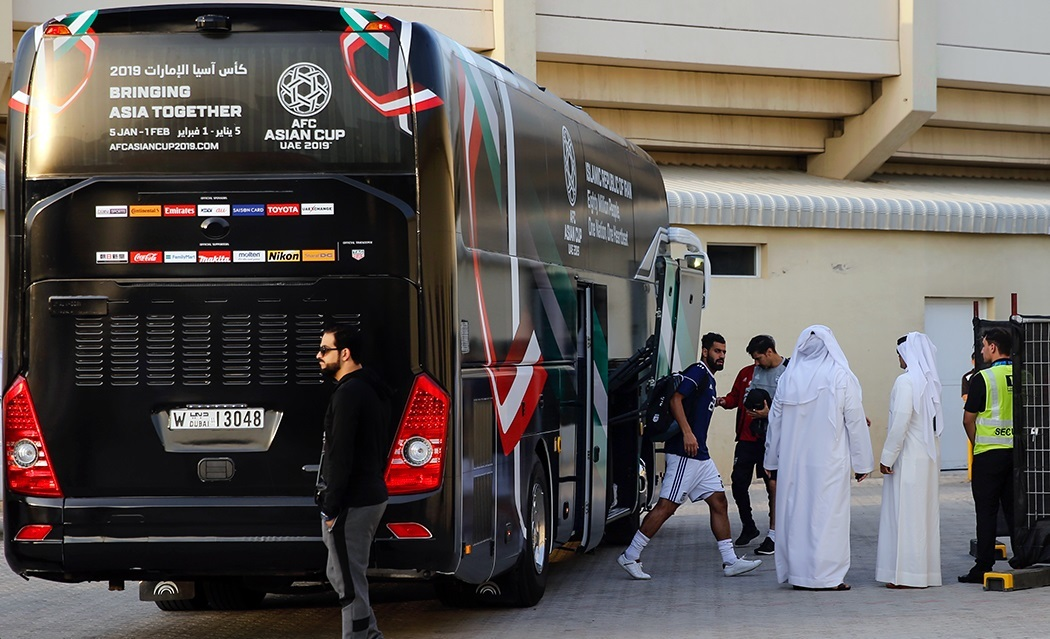
Iran national team bus

=== Logo and slogan ===
The official logo of the 2019 AFC Asian Cup was unveiled on 23 January 2017 in Abu Dhabi during the drawing ceremony for the third round of the 2019 AFC Asian Cup qualification. The colors used in the logo were derived from the flag of the UAE. The seven hexagons formed by colored ribbons represents the seven emirates of the host country. The interlacing hexagon pattern of the logo was inspired from Islamic art, as well as the old Emirati tradition of using palm leaves, locally known as saf, in weaving. The outer circle along with the geometric design within it symbolizes the sport of football.

The slogan, "Bringing Asia Together" (Arabic: جمع آسيا معاً), was unveiled on 5 January 2018, a year before the tournament's kick-off.

=== Match ball ===
The official match ball, the Molten Acentec, was made by Molten Corporation.

=== Mascots ===
Meow Mansour During the final draw on 4 May 2018, two mascots, Mansour and Jarrah, were unveiled. Mansour is a young footballer, while Jarrah is a falcon with lightning speed [sic]. The falcon is an important symbol of the Arab world and also features on the emblem of the United Arab Emirates.

=== Song ===
Theme song was Zanaha Zayed by Hussain Al Jassmi, Balqees Ahmed Fathi and Eida Al Menhali.

=== Trophy ===
Also on the drawing day on 4 May 2018, a new trophy made by Thomas Lyte was unveiled. It is 78 centimetres tall, 42 centimetres wide and weighs 15 kilograms of silver. The trophy is modeled over the lotus flower, a symbolic flower of Asia. The five petals of the lotus symbolise the five sub-confederations under the AFC. The winning teams' names are engraved around the trophy base, which is separable from the trophy's main body.

=== Prize money ===
For the first time in AFC Asian Cup history, the AFC awarded prize money to participating teams. The total prize money pool for the tournament was US$14,800,000. The champions received US$5 million, the runners-up received US$3 million, and the losing semi-finalists would receive US$1 million. All 24 participating teams also received US$200,000.

=== Team bus slogans ===
The tournament organizers held a competition where fans got to choose and vote on slogans to be used on the team buses of the 24 participating national teams.

=== Sponsorship ===
Official Sponsors

- BeIN Sports
- Continental AG
- Emirates
- KDDI Au
- Saison Card
- UAE Exchange / Unimoni
- Toyota

Official Supporters

- Coca-Cola
- FamilyMart
- Makita
- Molten Corporation
- Nikon
- Sharaf DG
- The Asahi Shimbun

TAG Heuer was the official timekeeper of the tournament.

== Broadcasting ==
The tournament was broadcast live by around 80 TV channels covering the whole world. 800 million people were expected to watch matches, with the tournament reaching a potential TV audience of more than 2.5 billion people. Below was the list of confirmed broadcasting right holders for 2019 AFC Asian Cup.

ESPN5 made a "competitive bid" to broadcast the tournament on free-to-air television in the Philippines, but it was not accepted by the AFC.

In the Middle East, where Qatar-based BeIN Sports has rights to broadcast the Asian Cup in the region, BeoutQ (allegedly backed by Saudi Arabia) also illegally broadcast the tournament as part of a proxy conflict in a diplomatic crisis between Qatar and various Arab states. The AFC has noted BeoutQ's broadcast and condemned it for "persistent and illegal screening".

Broadcast rights are sold by Lagardère Sports on behalf of the AFC.

| Country or Territory | Television broadcaster(s) | Online/streaming transmission | Ref. |
|---|---|---|---|
| Middle East and North Africa | BeIN Sports | BeIN Sports Connect | |
| Anglo America: Canada; United States | | DAZN (Note: DAZN only broadcast seven of 51 matches, starting from the quarter-finals.) | |
| Balkan Countries: Albania; Bosnia and Herzegovina; Croatia; Kosovo; Macedonia; Montenegro; Serbia; Slovenia | Arena Sport | Klik Sport | |
| Afghanistan | Lemar TV | | |
| Australia | Fox Sports | Foxtel Go | |
| Australia | Fox Sports | MyFootball | |
| Australia | Fox Sports | Kayo Sports | |
| Cambodia | BTV News | | |
| China | CCTV | PPTV | |
| China | CCTV | Youku | |
| France | BeIN Sports (Note: Live coverage for final only, with highlights of all matches.) | BeIN Sports Connect | |
| Hong Kong | Fox Sports | Fox+ (Note: Fox+ broadcast all 51 matches for Hong Kong, Philippines, Singapore, and Taiwan viewers only.) | |
| Papua New Guinea | Fox Sports | Fox+ | |
| Southeast Asia: Brunei; Cambodia; Indonesia; Laos; Malaysia; Myanmar; Philippines; Singapore; Thailand; Timor Leste; Vietnam | Fox Sports | Fox+ | |
| Taiwan | Fox Sports | Fox+ | |
| India | Star Sports | Hotstar | |
| Iran | IRIB TV3 | Anten | |
| Iran | Varzesh | Anten | |
| Japan | TV Asahi | | |
| Japan | NHK BS1 | | |
| Kyrgyzstan | KTRK Sport | | |
| Lebanon | Télé Liban (Note: Lebanon matches only.) | | |
| Qatar | Al Kass | | |
| South Korea | JTBC | | |
| South Korea | JTBC3 Fox Sports | | |
| Thailand | Channel 7 (Note: Channel 7 broadcast Thailand matches only, with all 51 matches also live and free on Bugaboo TV.) | Bugaboo TV | |
| Turkmenistan | Turkmenistan Sport | | |
| United Kingdom: England; Northern Ireland; Scotland; Wales | | Bet365 | |
| Uzbekistan | Sport-UZ | Mediabay | |
| Vietnam | VTV (Note: shared by Fox Sports Asia) | VTV Go | |

== Controversies ==
=== Australia vs. Palestine ===
Many ticket-holding fans were locked out of the Group B match between Palestine and Australia, with management closing a number of Rashid Stadium gates before the start of the match "in the interests of fan safety". Rashid Stadium was one of the smallest stadiums in the tournament with only 12,000 seats and many non-ticket holding fans attempted to watch the match without buying tickets. The organizing committee issued a statement for the reasons of closure stating "Ahead of kick-off a large crowd of fans with and without tickets had gathered over a short period of time outside the stadium, which resulted in the need to secure the area." They then issued an apology to supporters who were “inconvenienced or left disappointed” and issued an investigative probe to insure it to be an isolated incident.

=== Qatar travel complications ===
As a result of Qatar diplomatic crisis between Qatar and number of its neighbours since 5 June 2017, including the United Arab Emirates as the host country, the UAE suspended all direct flights between the two countries and initially banned Qatari citizens from entering their country, although the Emirati government later announced that it would permit Qatari citizens temporary entry into the country pending approval from Emirati authorities. According to a report, Saoud al-Mohannadi, a Qatari national who is the AFC vice-president and chairman of the organizing committee for the Asian Cup, was unable to enter the UAE two days prior to the tournament's start because Emirati authorities had not yet cleared him. The director of the 2019 AFC Organizing Committee denied reports that Al Mohannadi was refused entry and declared that Al Mohannadi has arrived on Friday morning and was preparing for his meetings. The director stated that there was no evidence that shows he was unable to enter and stated that this news has "political purposes". He stated "We try to keep sports away from politics."

The diplomatic crisis prevented many fans from attending Qatar matches in the UAE. This had affected attendance figures in Qatar matches, as little more than 450 people spectated the Group E clash between North Korea and Qatar on 13 January. The UAE government had confirmed previously that Qatari citizens may enter UAE with prior permission obtained directly through a hotline from UAE authorities.

According to Qatar's Sports Press Committee, five Qatar-based media representatives were denied entry into the UAE despite having entry visas and receiving assurances that they would be allowed to attend and report on the tournament by the AFC. The AFC Media Committee dismissed the Qatari reports and stated that some of the Qatar-based journalists confused visit visas with work visas and advised all journalists to contact them if they encounter any issues with the entry visa type.

According to Al Jazeera, the final match, which was won by Qatar, was played "almost entirely without" Qatari support from the stands, due to the travel ban. However, according to Qatar-based The Peninsula large number of Omani fans supported the Qatari team in the stadium, stating "The large number of fans who supported the Qatari team were wearing the logo of Al Annabi [The Maroons] with the background of the names of various players. Apart from their attendance, they carried flags in the stadium and continued to cheer for Al Annabi [The Maroons] players and sing songs throughout the game."

=== Footwear-throwing incident ===
During the semi-final match between Qatar and hosts United Arab Emirates, some UAE supporters threw bottles and footwear into the match after Qatari players scored their second goal; the latter is considered to be highly offensive in the Middle East. One of the Qatari players, Salem Al Hajri, was struck on the head with a shoe after Qatar scored its third goal. This conduct was preceded by booing the Qatari national anthem. The two countries had had a hostile relationship and had cut diplomatic ties due to the ongoing diplomatic crisis. Qatar won 4–0 despite the events, reaching their first Asian Cup final. Afterwards, the AFC declared that it would conduct an investigation into the proceedings.

=== Qatar player eligibility ===
On 30 January 2019, soon after the hosts lost to Qatar in the semi-finals, the United Arab Emirates Football Association lodged a formal appeal to the AFC over the eligibility of Sudanese-born Almoez Ali and Iraqi-born Bassam Al-Rawi, claiming that they did not qualify to play for Qatar on residency grounds per Article 7 of the Regulations Governing the Application of the FIFA statutes, which states a player is eligible to play for a representative team if he has "lived continuously for at least five years after reaching the age of 18 on the territory of the relevant association". It was alleged that Ali and Al-Rawi had not lived continuously in Qatar for at least five years over the age of 18, although the players claimed that their mothers were born in Qatar.

Only hours prior to the start of the final on 1 February 2019, the AFC Disciplinary and Ethics Committee announced that it had dismissed the protest lodged by the UAEFA.

=== Qatar football shirt fan incident ===
A British-Sudanese football fan claimed that he was beaten and arrested for wearing a Qatari shirt to a match in which Qatar were playing and then, after reporting to the police, arrested and accused of wasting police time and making false statements of being assaulted. In an interview with Sky News, he claimed he was beaten, starved, and deprived of sleep by the police for wearing a Qatar shirt. The fan claims were denied by UAE authorities who stated that he was arrested for wasting police time and making false assault claims to the police.

"The police took him to hospital where a doctor who examined him concluded that his injuries were inconsistent with his account of events and appeared to be self-inflicted,"

– The government said.

The police claimed that the fan had admitted to making false statements and his offense will be processed through the courts. An official in the UAE embassy in London stated "He was categorically not arrested for wearing a Qatar football shirt. This is instead an instance of a person seeking media attention and wasting police time."
