= Rashid Stadium =

Stadium in Dubai, United Arab Emirates

Coordinates: 25°16′47″N 55°21′38″E

- استاد راشد
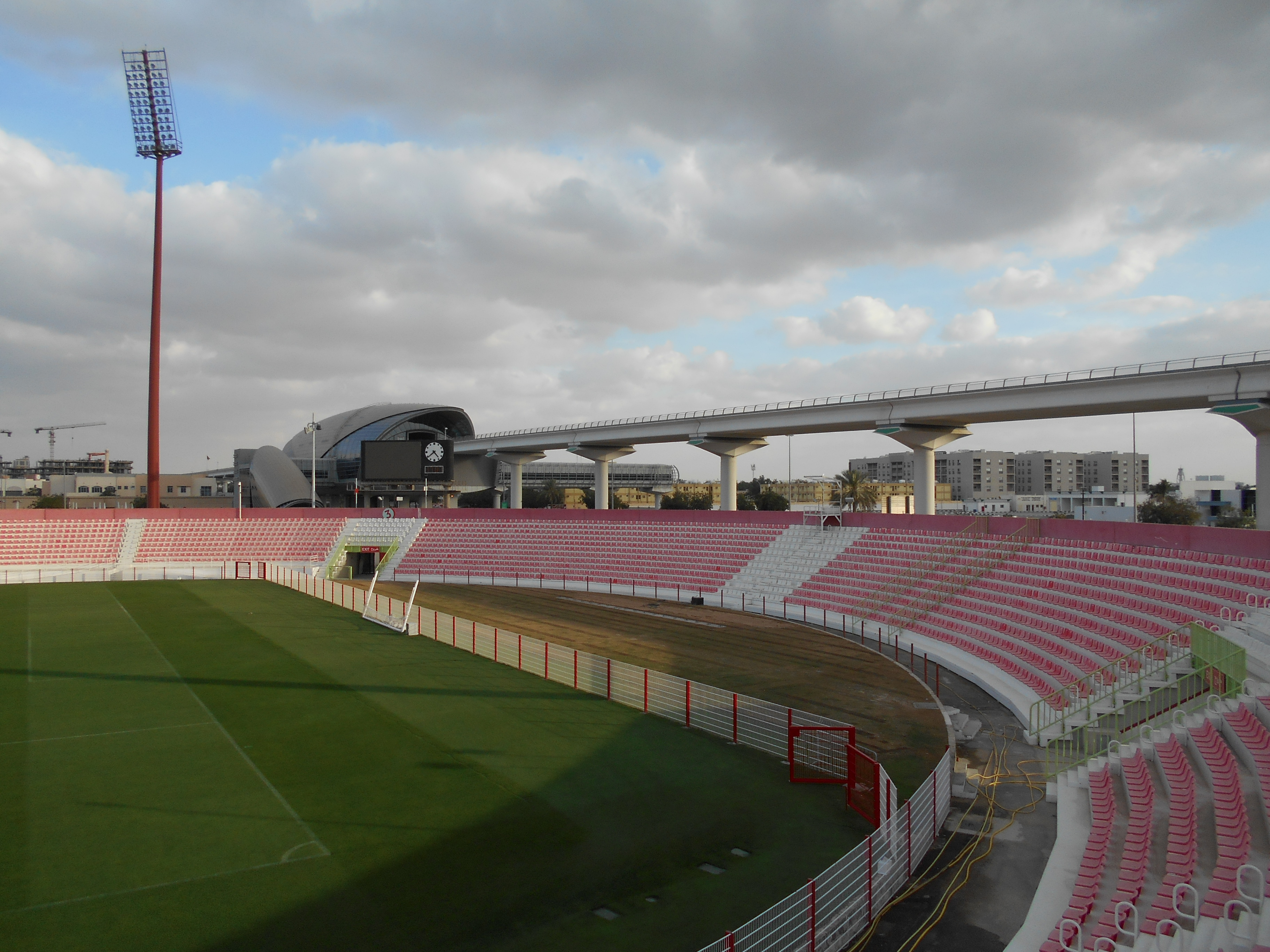
- Interactive map of Rashid Stadium
- Operator: Shabab Al-Ahli
- Capacity: 8,015
- Type: Stadium
- Event: Sporting Event

Construction
- Built: 1948
- Opened: 1949

Tenant
- Shabab Al-Ahli

Rashid Stadium (Arabic: استاد راشد) is a multi-purpose stadium in Dubai, United Arab Emirates. It is currently used mostly for football and rugby matches. The stadium holds 8,015 people. For AFC Asian Cup 2019 stadium was expanded with temporal stands to 12,056 seats. It was built in 1948.

The stadium hosted several matches of the 2003 FIFA World Youth Championship, 2013 FIFA U-17 World Cup, and 2019 AFC Asian Cup.

== 2019 AFC Asian Cup ==
Rashid Stadium hosted five games of the 2019 Asian Cup, including a Round of 16 match.

Date	Time	Team No. 1	Res.	Team No. 2	Round	Attendance
8 January 2019	20:00	Saudi Arabia	4–0	North Korea	Group E	5,075
11 January 2019	15:00	Palestine	0–3	Australia	Group B	11,915
13 January 2019	20:00	Turkmenistan	0–4	Uzbekistan	Group F	4,354
16 January 2019	17:30	Kyrgyzstan	3–1	Philippines	Group C	4,217
22 January 2019	17:00	South Korea	2–1 (aet)	Bahrain	Round of 16	7,658

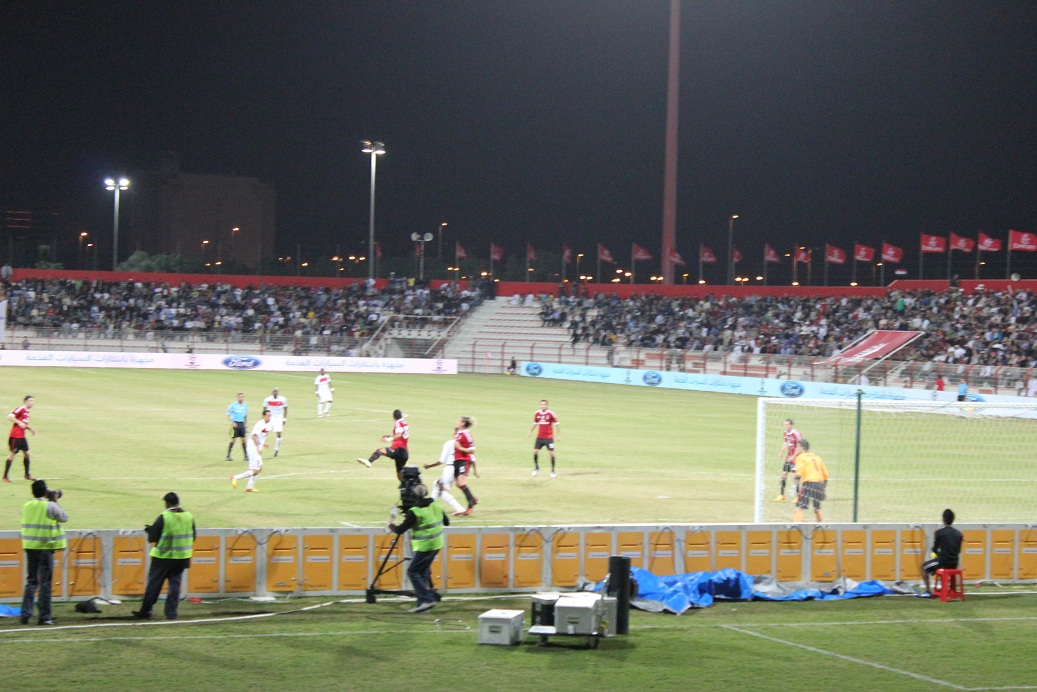
Rashid Stadium, January 2012 (A.C. Milan vs PSG)
