= Palestine national football team results (1998–2009) =

This is a list of the Palestine national football team results from 1998 to 2009.

== Results ==
=== 1998 ===
20 July 1998 1998 Arab Nations Cup qualification	Lebanon	3–1	Palestine	Beirut, Lebanon
				Stadium: Beirut Municipal Stadium

23 July 1998 1998 Arab Nations Cup qualification	Palestine	1–2	Syria	Beirut, Lebanon
				Stadium: Beirut Municipal Stadium

26 July 1998 1998 Arab Nations Cup qualification	Jordan	1–1	Palestine	Beirut, Lebanon
				Stadium: Beirut Municipal Stadium

=== 1999 ===
18 August 1999 1999 Pan Arab Games	Palestine	0–2	Jordan	Amman, Jordan
			Abu Zema 35', 58'

23 August 1999 1999 Pan Arab Games	Palestine	1–0	United Arab Emirates	Amman, Jordan
	Lafi 35'			Stadium: Al-Hassan Stadium; Attendance: 7,000; Referee: Nabil Ayad (Lebanon)

25 August 1999 1999 Pan Arab Games	Libya	2–2	Palestine	Amman, Jordan
	El Masli 27'; Mohamed 82' (pen.)		Al Manasri 1'; Jendeya 90'	Stadium: Amman International Stadium; Referee: Mourad Al-Daami (Tunisia)

27 August 1999 1999 Pan Arab Games	Syria	1–1	Palestine	Amman, Jordan
	Al-Sayed 19'		Al-Kord 82'	Stadium: Amman International Stadium; Attendance: 8,000; Referee: Abdul-Wahed Al-Khamisi (Yemen)

29 August 1999 1999 Pan Arab Games	Jordan	4–1	Palestine	Amman, Jordan
	Al-Shagran 14', 67', 75'; Jummah 41'		Al-Kord 90'	Stadium: Amman International Stadium; Attendance: 25,000; Referee: Mourad Al-Daami (Tunisia)

=== 2000 ===
31 March 2000 2000 Asian Cup qual.	Qatar	1–0	Palestine	Doha, Qatar
	Mustafa 16'			Stadium: Jassim bin Hamad Stadium

2 April 2000 2000 Asian Cup qual.	Palestine	2–0	Pakistan	Doha, Qatar
	El-Manasri 1'; Al-Jaish 62'			Stadium: Jassim bin Hamad Stadium; Attendance: 6,000

4 April 2000 2000 Asian Cup qual.	Palestine	1–5	Jordan	Doha, Qatar
	Fahad 49'		Abu Zema 6', 22'; Abdullah 35'; Al-Khatib 37', 47'	Stadium: Jassim bin Hamad Stadium; Attendance: 11,000

6 April 2000 2000 Asian Cup qual.	Kazakhstan	2–0	Palestine	Doha, Qatar
	Kadyrkulov 38'; Litvinenko 90'			Stadium: Jassim bin Hamad Stadium; Attendance: 2,500; Referee: Jalal Moradi (Iran)

24 May 2000 2000 WAFF	Palestine	0–1	Syria	Amman, Jordan
			Al Beetar 80'	Stadium: King Abdullah II Stadium

26 May 2000 2000 WAFF	Iran	1–1	Palestine	Amman, Jordan
	Samereh 54'		Lafi 90+2'	Stadium: King Abdullah II Stadium

28 May 2000 2000 WAFF	Palestine	2–3	Kazakhstan	Amman, Jordan
	Lafi 55'; Al-Faran 83'		Kadyrkulov 29', 88'; Bogatyrev 43'	Stadium: King Abdullah II Stadium

=== 2001 ===
4 March 2001 2002 WCQ R1	Hong Kong	1–1	Palestine	Hong Kong
15:15 UTC+08	Ho Man 72'		Ayoub 64'	Stadium: Hong Kong Stadium; Attendance: 7,000; Referee: Han Byung-Hwa (South Korea)

8 March 2001 2002 WCQ R1	Palestine	1–2	Qatar	Hong Kong
18:00 UTC+08	Ayoub 54'		Al Naemi 31'; Mustafa 65'	Stadium: Hong Kong Stadium; Attendance: 5,000; Referee: Ekachai Tanaddernkao (Thailand)

11 March 2001 2002 WCQ R1	Palestine	1–0	Malaysia	Hong Kong
13:00 UTC+08	Al-Jaish 36'			Stadium: Hong Kong Stadium; Attendance: 4,540; Referee: Mohammad Tajul Islam (Bangladesh)

20 March 2001 2002 WCQ R1	Palestine	1–0	Hong Kong	Doha, Qatar
15:30 UTC+03	Lafi 58'			Stadium: Jassim bin Hamad Stadium; Attendance: 500; Referee: Abdul Rahman Al-Zaid (Saudi Arabia)

23 March 2001 2002 WCQ R1	Qatar	2–1	Palestine	Doha, Qatar
18:15 UTC+03	Al-Enazi 24'; Hassan 45'		Ayoub 30'	Stadium: Jassim bin Hamad Stadium; Attendance: 4,000; Referee: Naotsugu Fuse (Japan)

25 March 2001 2002 WCQ R1	Malaysia	4–3	Palestine	Doha, Qatar
18:15 UTC+03	Rakhli 21', 62' (pen.); Omar 53'; Idrus 56'		Ayoub 3'; Al-Holi 29' (pen.); Al-Jaish 90'	Stadium: Grand Hamad Stadium; Attendance: 400; Referee: Abdul Rahman Al-Zaid (Saudi Arabia)

=== 2002 ===
30 August 2002 2002 WAFF	Syria	2–1	Palestine	Damascus, Syria
				Stadium: Abbasiyyin Stadium

1 September 2002 2002 WAFF	Palestine	0–2	Iraq	Damascus, Syria
				Stadium: Abbasiyyin Stadium

10 December 2002 Friendly	Chile	3–1	Palestine	Santiago, Chile

16 December 2002 2002 Arab Cup	Palestine	1–1	Jordan	Kuwait City, Kuwait
				Stadium: Al Kuwait Sports Club Stadium

23 December 2002 2002 Arab Cup	Sudan	2–2	Palestine	Kuwait City, Kuwait
				Stadium: Al Kuwait Sports Club Stadium

25 December 2002 2002 Arab Cup	Kuwait	3–3	Palestine	Kuwait City, Kuwait
				Stadium: Al Kuwait Sports Club Stadium

=== 2003 ===
24 September 2003 2004 Asian Cup qual.	Palestine	1–1	Qatar	Doha, Qatar
	Mansour 90'		Abdullah 47'

27 September 2003 2004 Asian Cup qual.	Qatar	2–1	Palestine	Doha, Qatar
	Mohyeddin 68'; Hamzah 90'		Abdala 77'

5 October 2003 2004 Asian Cup qual.	Kuwait	2–1	Palestine	Hawally, Kuwait
	Wabran 25'; Al-Mutawa 59'		Amer 72'	Stadium: Mohammed Al-Hamad Stadium; Referee: Abdullah Al-Harasi (Oman)

8 October 2003 2004 Asian Cup qual.	Palestine	0–4	Kuwait	Hawally, Kuwait
			Abdullah 36', 57' (pen.); Al-Mutawa 42', 46'	Stadium: Mohammed Al-Hamad Stadium; Referee: Muslim Al-Boloushi (United Arab Emirates)

19 October 2003 2004 Asian Cup qual.	Singapore	2–0	Palestine	Kallang, Singapore
	Juraimi 18'; Shah 88'			Stadium: Jalan Besar Stadium; Attendance: 2,787; Referee: Sarkar Subrata (India)

22 October 2003 2004 Asian Cup qual.	Palestine	0–0	Singapore	Kallang, Singapore
				Stadium: Jalan Besar Stadium; Attendance: 3,076; Referee: Anura de Silva (Sri Lanka)

=== 2004 ===
18 February 2004 2006 WCQ R2	Palestine	8–0	Chinese Taipei	Al Wakrah, Qatar
	Al-Kord 10'; Habaib 20', 32'; Atura 43'; Kettlun 52', 86'; Amer 76'; Keshkesh 82'			Stadium: Saoud bin Abdulrahman Stadium; Attendance: 1,000; Referee: Mukhtar Al Yarimi (Yemen)

31 March 2004 2006 WCQ R2	Palestine	1–1	Iraq	Al Wakrah, Qatar
	Kettlun 72'		Farhan 20'	Stadium: Saoud bin Abdulrahman Stadium; Attendance: 500; Referee: Hassan Al Shoufi (Syria)

9 June 2004 2006 WCQ R2	Uzbekistan	3–0	Palestine	Tashkent, Uzbekistan
	Ashurmatov 6'; Shishelov 42'; Djeparov 89'			Stadium: Pakhtakor Central Stadium; Attendance: 35,000; Referee: Masoud Moradi (Iran)

8 September 2004 2006 WCQ R2	Palestine	0–3	Uzbekistan	Al Rayyan, Qatar
				Stadium: Ahmed bin Ali Stadium

14 October 2004 2006 WCQ R2	Chinese Taipei	0–1	Palestine	Taipei, Taiwan
				Stadium: Zhongshan Soccer Stadium

16 November 2004 2006 WCQ R2	Iraq	4–1	Palestine	Al Rayyan, Qatar
				Stadium: Thani bin Jassim Stadium

=== 2006 ===
7 February 2006 Friendly	Syria	3–0	Palestine	Damascus, Syria
				Stadium: Abbasiyyin Stadium

16 February 2006 Friendly	Bahrain	0–2	Palestine	Muharraq, Bahrain
				Stadium: Sheikh Ali bin Mohammed Al Khalifa Stadium

18 February 2006 Friendly	Palestine	3–0	Pakistan	Riffa, Bahrain
	Attal 55', 75'; Salem 85'			Stadium: Bahrain National Stadium

22 February 2006 2007 Asian Cup qual.	China	2–0	Palestine	Guangzhou, China
19:30	Du Wei 23'; Li Weifeng 62'			Stadium: Tianhe Stadium; Attendance: 16,500; Referee: Kwon Jong-chul (South Korea)

1 March 2006 2007 Asian Cup qual.	Palestine	1–0	Singapore	Amman, Jordan
16:00	Attal 75'			Stadium: Amman International Stadium; Referee: Abdullah Al Hilali (Oman)

1 April 2006 2006 Challenge Cup Group C	Palestine	11–0	Guam	Dhaka, Bangladesh
15:30	Keshkesh 6'; Attal 14', 20', 25', 32', 45+1', 86'; Atura 22'; Al Amour 39'; Al-Kord 59', 67'			Stadium: Bangabandhu National Stadium; Attendance: 3,000; Referee: Ala Abdul Kadir Nema (Iraq)

3 April 2006 2006 Challenge Cup Group C	Cambodia	0–4	Palestine	Dhaka, Bangladesh
15:30			Keshkesh 10'; Al-Sweirki 12', 75'; Attal 30'	Stadium: Bangabandhu National Stadium; Attendance: 2,500; Referee: Ala Abdul Kadir Nema (Iraq)

5 April 2006 2006 Challenge Cup Group C	Palestine	1–1	Bangladesh	Dhaka, Bangladesh
15:30	Attal 30'		Tapu 55'	Stadium: Bangabandhu National Stadium; Attendance: 22,000; Referee: Hedayat Mombini (Iran)

9 April 2006 2006 Challenge Cup quarter-final	Palestine	0–1	Kyrgyzstan	Dhaka, Bangladesh
15:30			Djamshidov 90+1'	Stadium: Bangabandhu National Stadium; Attendance: 150; Referee: Win Cho (Myanmar)

17 August 2006 2007 Asian Cup qual.	Palestine	0–3	Iraq	Amman, Jordan
20:00			Mahmoud 59', 62'; Nasser 90'	Stadium: King Abdullah II Stadium; Attendance: 5,000; Referee: Muhsen Basma (Syria)

6 September 2006 2007 Asian Cup qual.	Iraq	2–2	Palestine	Al Ain, United Arab Emirates
20:30	Sadir 70'; M. Mohammed 75'		Amer 13'; Al Amour 78'	Stadium: Khalifa bin Zayed Stadium; Attendance: 1,000; Referee: Salem Mujghef (Jordan)

11 October 2006 2007 Asian Cup qual.	Palestine	0–2	China	Amman, Jordan
22:00			Mao Jianqing 27'; Sun Xiang 65'	Stadium: King Abdullah II Stadium; Attendance: 3,000; Referee: Saad Kamil Al-Fadhli (Kuwait)

15 November 2006 2007 Asian Cup qual.	Singapore	Cancelled	Palestine	Kallang, Singapore
				Stadium: Jalan Besar Stadium

=== 2007 ===
18 June 2007 2007 WAFF	Palestine	0–1	Iraq	Amman, Jordan
		Report	Mohammed 86'	Stadium: Amman International Stadium

20 June 2007 2007 WAFF	Palestine	0–2	Iran	Amman, Jordan
		Report	Meydavoudi 56'; Rajabzadeh 85'	Stadium: Amman International Stadium; Attendance: 2,000

8 October 2007 2010 WCQ R1	Palestine	0–4	Singapore	Al Rayyan, Qatar
21:00 UTC+3		Report	Shi Jiayi 44', 53'; Wilkinson 73'; Noh Alam Shah 86'	Stadium: Ahmed bin Ali Stadium; Attendance: 75; Referee: Mushen Basma (Syria)

28 October 2007 2010 WCQ R1	Singapore	3–0 (Awarded)	Palestine	Singapore
17:00 UTC+8				Stadium: National Stadium; Referee: Sun Baojie (China)

=== 2008 ===
7 August 2008 2008 WAFF	Iran	3–0	Palestine	Tehran, Iran
				Stadium: Takhti Stadium

9 August 2008 2008 WAFF	Palestine	0–1	Qatar	Tehran, Iran
				Stadium: Takhti Stadium

26 October 2008 Friendly	Palestine	1–1	Jordan	Al-Ram, Palestine
	Keshkesh 4'	Report	Al-Nawateer 48'	Stadium: Faisal al-Husseini International Stadium

=== 2009 ===
26 March 2009 2010 Challenge Cup qual.	Nepal	0–0	Palestine	Kathmandu, Nepal
15:00		Report		Stadium: Dasarath Rangasala Stadium; Attendance: 12,000; Referee: Andre El Haddad (Lebanon)

30 March 2009 2010 Challenge Cup qual.	Kyrgyzstan	1–1	Palestine	Kathmandu, Nepal
15:00	Murzaev 20' (pen.)		Al-Sobakhi 29'	Stadium: Dasarath Rangasala Stadium; Attendance: 2,000; Referee: Yu Ming-hsun (Chinese Taipei)

10 July 2009 Friendly	Iraq	3–0	Palestine	Erbil, Iraq

13 July 2009 Friendly	Iraq	4–0	Palestine	Baghdad, Iraq

19 July 2009 Friendly	China	3–1	Palestine	Tianjin, China

10 October 2009 Friendly	United Arab Emirates	1–1	Palestine	Dubai, United Arab Emirates
				Stadium: Zabeel Stadium
