= 2008 AFC President's Cup =

Tournament details
- Host country: Kyrgyzstan
- Dates: 12 April - 26 June (group stage); 19-21 September (final stage)
- Teams: 4 (final stage); 11 (total) (from 11 associations)

Final positions
- Champions: (Tajikistan) Regar-TadAZ (2nd title)
- Runners-up: (Kyrgyzstan) Dordoi-Dynamo Naryn

Tournament statistics
- Matches played: 18
- Goals scored: 75 (4.17 per match)
- Top scorer: (Myanmar) Thi Ha Kyaw (6 goals)

The 2008 AFC President's Cup was the fourth edition of the AFC President's Cup, a competition for football clubs in countries categorized as "emerging nations" by the Asian Football Confederation. For this edition, the tournament was extended from eight to eleven teams, with three groups in place of the previous two. The three new teams came from Bangladesh, Myanmar and Turkmenistan. The eleven teams that competed were split up into three groups and played each other team in their group once. The winner of each group and the best runner-up qualified for the semifinals, and the winners of the semifinal matches played in the final match to determine the winner.

Each group was to be played over a period of days in April at one venue - Group A at Dashrath Stadium, Nepal, Group B at Chungshan Stadium, Taiwan and Group C at Sugathadasa Stadium, Sri Lanka. However, due to political unrest in Nepal, Group A matches were postponed and eventually played at MPPJ Stadium, Malaysia in June.

The final stage of the competition was played in Kyrgyzstan from 19–21 September.

== Venues ==
=== Group stage ===
Kuala Lumpur	Taipei	Colombo
MPPJ Stadium	Changchun Soccer Stadium	Sugathadasa Stadium
Capacity: 25,000	Capacity: 20,000	Capacity: 25,000

=== Final stage ===
Bishkek
Spartak Stadium
Capacity: 23,000

== Qualifying teams ==
Association	Team	Qualifying method	App	Last App
Bangladesh	Abahani Ltd.	2007 B.League champions	1st	
Bhutan	Transport United	2007 A-Division champions	4th	2007
Cambodia	Nagacorp FC	2007 Cambodian League champions	1st	
Chinese Taipei	Taipower	2007 Enterprise Football League champions	2nd	2005
Kyrgyzstan	Dordoi-Dynamo	2007 Kyrgyzstan League champions	4th	2007
Myanmar	Kanbawza	2007 Myanmar Premier League champions	1st	
Nepal	Nepal Police Club^{1}	2006–07 Martyr's Memorial A-Division League champions^{2}	2nd	2007
Pakistan	WAPDA^{3}	2007–08 Pakistan Premier League champions	2nd	2005
Sri Lanka	Ratnam SC	2007 Kit Premier League champions	3rd	2007
Tajikistan	Regar-TadAZ	2007 Tajik League champions	3rd	2007
Turkmenistan	FC Aşgabat	2007 Turkmenistan League champions	1st	

^{1} Mehandra Police Club now known as Nepal Police Club.
^{2} No league held in 2007–08 so 2006–07 champions qualify.
^{3} Pakistan Army F.C. were originally Pakistan's entrants, but replaced by WAPDA for rearranged group stage.

== Group stage ==
=== Group A ===
All matches played at MPPJ Stadium, Kuala Lumpur

Pos	Team	Pld	W	D	L	GF	GA	GD	Pts
1	(Tajikistan) Regar-TadAZ	3	2	1	0	6	4	+2	7
2	Nepal Police Club	3	1	2	0	7	3	+4	5
3	(Bangladesh) Abahani Ltd.	3	1	0	2	2	6	−4	3
4	(Pakistan) WAPDA	3	0	1	2	2	4	−2	1

22 June 2008
16:00

Nepal Police Club	4–0	(Bangladesh) Abahani Ltd.
Thapa 15'; Rai 18' 56' 70' (pen.)	Report

MPPJ Stadium, Malaysia
Attendance: 100
Referee: Abdulrahman Racho (Syria)
22 June 2008
18:30

Regar-TadAZ (Tajikistan)	2–1	(Pakistan) WAPDA
Hasanov 17'; Tukhtasunov 76'	Report	Niazi 24'

MPPJ Stadium, Malaysia
Attendance: 50
Referee: Tan Hai (China)

24 June 2008
16:00

WAPDA (Pakistan)	1–1	Nepal Police Club
Ali Shah 78'	Report	Rai 89'

MPPJ Stadium, Malaysia
Attendance: 300
Referee: Çarymyrat Gurbanow (Turkmenistan)
24 June 2008
18:30

Abahani Ltd. (Bangladesh)	1–2	(Tajikistan) Regar-TadAZ
Awudu 25'	Report	Rabimov 15'; Ismoilov 45'

MPPJ Stadium, Malaysia
Attendance: 50
Referee: Ng Chui Kok (Hong Kong)

26 June 2008
16:00

WAPDA (Pakistan)	0–1	(Bangladesh) Abahani Ltd.
	Report	Ameli 84'

MPPJ Stadium, Malaysia
Attendance: 200
Referee: Çarymyrat Gurbanow (Turkmenistan)
26 June 2008
18:30

Nepal Police Club	2–2	(Tajikistan) Regar-TadAZ
Ghimire 33'; Rai 67'	Report	Rabimov 47' 90+1'

MPPJ Stadium, Malaysia
Attendance: 200
Referee: Tan Hai (China)

=== Group B ===
All matches played at Chungshan Stadium, Taipei

Pos	Team	Pld	W	D	L	GF	GA	GD	Pts
1	(Kyrgyzstan) Dordoi-Dynamo	2	2	0	0	5	0	+5	6
2	(Cambodia) Nagacorp FC	2	0	1	1	2	4	−2	1
3	(Chinese Taipei) Taipower	2	0	1	1	2	5	−3	1

12 April 2008
18:00

Nagacorp FC (Cambodia)	2–2	(Chinese Taipei) Taipower
Sotitya 45'; Vathanak 58'	Report	Chiang 78', 84'

Chungshan Soccer Stadium
Attendance: 300
Referee: Dilovarshokh Orzuev (Tajikistan)

14 April 2008
18:00

Taipower (Chinese Taipei)	0–3	(Kyrgyzstan) Dordoi-Dynamo
	Report	Murzaev 19'; Amirov 78'; Askarov 80'

Chungshan Soccer Stadium
Attendance: 100
Referee: Chaiya Alee Mahapab (Thailand)

16 April 2008
18:00

Nagacorp FC (Cambodia)	0–2	(Kyrgyzstan) Dordoi-Dynamo
	Report	Harchenko 13'; Ablakimov 74'

Chungshan Soccer Stadium
Attendance: 25
Referee: Minoru Tojo (Japan)

=== Group C ===
All matches played at Sugathadasa Stadium, Colombo

Pos	Team	Pld	W	D	L	GF	GA	GD	Pts
1	(Turkmenistan) FC Aşgabat	3	2	0	1	9	2	+7	6
2	(Myanmar) Kanbawza	3	2	0	1	14	3	+11	6
3	(Sri Lanka) Ratnam SC	3	2	0	1	10	5	+5	6
4	(Bhutan) Transport United	3	0	0	3	2	25	−23	0

23 April 2008
18:30

Ratnam SC (Sri Lanka)	7–1	(Bhutan) Transport United
Channa 17', 41', 90'; Asmeer 25'; Weerasinghe 59'; Jayasuriya 60'; Pushpakumara 79'	Report	Wangchuk 22'

Sugathadasa Stadium, Colombo
Attendance: 3,200
Referee: Mukhtar Al Yarimi (Yemen)
23 April 2008
16:00

FC Aşgabat (Turkmenistan)	0–1	(Myanmar) Kanbawza
	Report	Kyaw 85'

Sugathadasa Stadium, Colombo
Attendance: 3,000
Referee: Tayeb Hasan Shamsuzzaman (Bangladesh)

25 April 2008
16:00

Transport United (Bhutan)	1–7	(Turkmenistan) FC Aşgabat
Pradhan 93'	Report	Gurbani 21'; Amanow 32', 36', 48'; Murhalyýew 41', 50'; Saparow 71'

Sugathadasa Stadium, Colombo
Attendance: 500
Referee: Kadhum Auda (Iraq)
25 April 2008
18:30

Kanbawza (Myanmar)	2–3	(Sri Lanka) Ratnam SC
Kyaw 43', 50'	Report	Jayasuriya 9', 81'; Mohamed 54'

Sugathadasa Stadium, Colombo
Attendance: 2,000
Referee: Rustam Saidov (Uzbekistan)

27 April 2008
16:00

Kanbawza (Myanmar)	11–0	(Bhutan) Transport United
Kyaw 11', 36', 90+2'; Tun 15', 23', 31', 71'; Lwin 38'; Htet 41', 51'; Than 74'	Report

Sugathadasa Stadium, Colombo
Attendance: 500
Referee: Rustam Saidov (Uzbekistan)
27 April 2008
18:30

Ratnam SC (Sri Lanka)	0–2	(Turkmenistan) FC Aşgabat
	Report	Çoňkaýew 39'; Amanow 45'

Sugathadasa Stadium, Colombo
Attendance: 4,000
Referee: Kadhum Auda (Iraq)

== Final stage ==
=== Semi-finals ===
19 September 2008
16:30

Dordoi-Dynamo (Kyrgyzstan)	3–1	Nepal Police Club
Tetteh 19', 84'; Murzaev 59'	Report	Thapa 72'

Spartak Stadium, Bishkek
Attendance: 8,000
Referee: Atallah Jatli Al-Enezi (Kuwait)

19 September 2008
12:00

Regar-TadAZ (Tajikistan)	4–3 (a.e.t.)	(Turkmenistan) FC Aşgabat
Rustamov 23'; Simões 29'; Minhairov 87'; Makhmudov 112'	Report	Ataýew 25'; Geldiýew 35'; Mirzoýew 69'

Spartak Stadium, Bishkek
Attendance: 800
Referee: Rustam Saidov (Uzbekistan)

=== Final ===
21 September 2008
16:30

Dordoi-Dynamo (Kyrgyzstan)	1–1 (3–4 pens.)	(Tajikistan) Regar-TadAZ
Tetteh 33'	Report	Tukhtasunov 53'

Spartak Stadium, Bishkek
Attendance: 10,000
Referee: Kadhum Auda (Iraq)

Dordoi-Dynamo	Regar-TadAZ

DORDOI-DYNAMO:
GK	1	Vladislav Volkov
DF	3	Talant Samsaliev	(yellow card) 117'
DF	4	Ruslan Sydykov
DF	8	Azamat Baimatov
DF	20	Igor Kudrenko
MF	5	Sergey Knyazev		(substituted off) 60'
MF	7	Aibek Bokoev	(yellow card) 16'	(substituted off) 96'
MF	18	Vadim Harchenko
FW	6	Daniel Tago	(yellow card) 62'
FW	9	David Tetteh
FW	10	Mirlan Murzaev		(substituted off) 70'
Substitutes:
DF	2	Faruh Abitov		(substituted on) 60'
MF	13	Davron Askarov		(substituted on) 96'
FW	19	Ildar Amirov		(substituted on) 70'
Manager:
(Kyrgyzstan) Boris Podkorytov

REGAR-TADAZ:
GK	16	Alisher Dodov
DF	2	Safarali Karimov
DF	5	Maruf Rustamov	(yellow card) 71'
DF	6	Farrukh Choriev
DF	13	Naim Nasirov	(yellow card) 16'
MF	9	Khurshed Makhmudov
MF	10	Jamshed Ismailov	(yellow card) 112'
MF	11	Alisher Hakberdiev		(substituted off) 46'
MF	23	Ilhomzhon Orkitov		(substituted off) 120'
FW	14	Davronjon Tukhtasunov		(substituted off) 62'
FW	18	Victor Simões
Substitutes:
DF	3	Farkhodzon Kholbekov		(substituted on) 46'
MF	7	Ibrahim Rabimov		(substituted on) 62'
FW	17	Shujoat Nematov		(substituted on) 120'
Manager:
(Tajikistan) Khabibulloev Makhmadjon

OFFICIALS

- Linesman: Sokhandan Reza (Iran)
- Linesman: Bakhtiyor Tagaev (Uzbekistan)

AFC President's Cup 2008

Second title
