= Bangladeshi football clubs in Asian competitions =

Records of the Bangladeshi clubs in continental club football competitions organised by the Asian Football Confederation.

There have been eight different continental representatives from Bangladesh throughout its footballing history, with Dhaka Abahani becoming the first when they participated in the 1985–86 Asian Club Championship. Dhaka Mohammedan, are the most successful Bangladeshi club at both domestic and continental level, having won the Bangladesh top division 20 times and achieving notable continental success by reaching the Asian Club Championship (now AFC Champions League Elite) Semi-final Group Round once (1988–89) and the Quarter-final Group Round twice (1990–91 and 1991). Another significant achievement was made by Dhaka Abahani, who reached the Inter-zone Semi-final of the AFC's second-tier club competition, the AFC Cup (now AFC Champions League Two) during the 2019 edition.

== Asian Club Championship/AFC Champions League/AFC Champions League Elite ==
=== Overview ===
==== Results ====
Team	Appearances	1985–86	1986	1987	1988–89	1989–90	1990–91	1991	1992–93	1993–94	1994–95–1996–97	1997–98	1998–99	1999–2000	2000–01	2001–02	2002–03–2022	2023–24
Dhaka Abahani	1	QS	DNP	–	–	–	–	–	–	W/D	DNP	–	DNP	–	DNP	–	DNP	–
Dhaka Mohammedan	6	–	DNP	QS	SF^{1}	QS	QF^{2}	QF^{2}	–	–	DNP	QS	DNP	–	DNP	–	DNP	–
Brothers Union	1	–	DNP	–	–	–	–	–	QS	–	DNP	–	DNP	–	DNP	–	DNP	–
Muktijoddha Sangsad	2	–	DNP	–	–	–	–	–	–	–	DNP	–	DNP	QS	DNP	R16	DNP	–
Bashundhara Kings	1	–	DNP	–	–	–	–	–	–	–	DNP	–	DNP	–	DNP	–	DNP	QS

W: Winners RU: Runners-up SF: Semifinals QF: Quarterfinals R16: Round of 16 GS: Group Stage QS: Qualifying Stage DNP: Did not participate W/D: Withdraw

- ^{1} Semi-final group round
- ^{2} Quarter-final group round

==== Statistics by club ====
Overall Statistics
#	Team	GP	W	D	L	GF	GA	GD	Best Finish
1	(Bangladesh) Dhaka Mohammedan	27	11	7	9	51	47	+4	Semifinals (1988–89)
2	(Bangladesh) Dhaka Abahani	5	4	0	1	17	4	+13	Qualifying stage (1985–86)
3	(Bangladesh) Muktijoddha Sangsad KC	6	2	1	3	4	14	-10	Qualifying stage (2) (1999–2000, 2001–02)
4	(Bangladesh) Brothers Union	2	0	1	1	0	2	-2	Qualifying stage (1992–93)
5	(Bangladesh) Bashundhara Kings	1	0	0	1	0	2	-2	Qualifying stage (2023–24)

=== Matches ===
==== Dhaka Abahani ====
Season	Round	Team 1	Score	Team 2	Venue
1985–86	Qualifying Stage	(India) East Bengal F.C.	1–0	(Bangladesh) Dhaka Abahani	Colombo, Sri Lanka
1985–86	Qualifying Stage	(Bangladesh) Dhaka Abahani	4–1	(Sri Lanka) Saunders SC	Colombo, Sri Lanka
1985–86	Qualifying Stage	(Bangladesh) Dhaka Abahani	3–0	(Pakistan) PIA FC	Colombo, Sri Lanka
1985–86	Qualifying Stage	(Bangladesh) Dhaka Abahani	2–1	(Nepal) New Road Team	Colombo, Sri Lanka
1985–86	Qualifying Stage	(Bangladesh) Dhaka Abahani	8–1	(Maldives) Club Valencia	Colombo, Sri Lanka

==== Dhaka Mohammedan ====
Season	Round	Team 1	Score	Team 2	Venue
1987	Qualifying Stage	(Bangladesh) Dhaka Mohammedan	6–2	(Nepal) Manang Marshyangdi Club	Dhaka, Bangladesh
1987	Qualifying Stage	(Iraq) Al-Rasheed SC	5–1	(Bangladesh) Dhaka Mohammedan	Dhaka, Bangladesh
1987	Qualifying Stage	(Bangladesh) Dhaka Mohammedan	3–1	(Pakistan) PAF FC	Dhaka, Bangladesh
1987	Qualifying Stage	(India) Mohun Bagan	2–2	(Bangladesh) Dhaka Mohammedan	Dhaka, Bangladesh
1988–89	Qualifying Stage	(Bangladesh) Dhaka Mohammedan	0–0	(Sri Lanka) Saunders SC	Dhaka, Bangladesh
1988–89	Qualifying Stage	(Bangladesh) Dhaka Mohammedan	2–1	(Iran) Persepolis F.C.	Dhaka, Bangladesh
1988–89	Semi Final League	(North Korea) April 25 Sports Club	0–1	(Bangladesh) Dhaka Mohammedan	Kuantan, Malaysia
1988–89	Semi Final League	(Qatar) Al-Sadd	2–2	(Bangladesh) Dhaka Mohammedan	Kuantan, Malaysia
1988–89	Semi Final League	(Saudi Arabia) Al-Ittifaq	3–1	(Bangladesh) Dhaka Mohammedan	Kuantan, Malaysia
1988–89	Semi Final League	(Bangladesh) Dhaka Mohammedan	1–2	(Malaysia) Pahang FA	Kuantan, Malaysia
1989–90	Qualifying Stage	(Bangladesh) Dhaka Mohammedan	3–1	(Sri Lanka) Old Benedictans SC	Ahvaz, Iran
1989–90	Qualifying Stage	(Bangladesh) Dhaka Mohammedan	7–2	(Maldives) Victory SC	Ahvaz, Iran
1989–90	Qualifying Stage	(Iran) Shahin Ahvaz F.C.	1–0	(Bangladesh) Dhaka Mohammedan	Ahvaz, Iran
1990–91	Qualifying Stage	(Bangladesh) Dhaka Mohammedan	5–0	(Maldives) Club Lagoons	Dhaka, Bangladesh
1990–91	Qualifying Stage	(Bangladesh) Dhaka Mohammedan	2–1	(India) Salgaocar SC	Dhaka, Bangladesh
1990–91	Quarter final	(Bangladesh) Dhaka Mohammedan	1–1	(Thailand) Bangkok Bank FC	Dhaka, Bangladesh
1990–91	Quarter final	(Bangladesh) Dhaka Mohammedan	0–0	(North Korea) April 25 Sports Club	Dhaka, Bangladesh
1990–91	Quarter final	(Iran) Esteghlal F.C.	1–1	(Bangladesh) Dhaka Mohammedan	Dhaka, Bangladesh
1991	Qualifying Stage	(Bangladesh) Dhaka Mohammedan	5–0	(Pakistan) WAPDA FC	Dhaka, Bangladesh
1991	Qualifying Stage	(Pakistan) WAPDA FC	0–0	(Bangladesh) Dhaka Mohammedan	Pakistan
1991	Qualifying Stage	(Bangladesh) Dhaka Mohammedan	3–0	(Maldives) New Radiant	Dhaka, Bangladesh
1991	Qualifying Stage	(Maldives) New Radiant	0–2	(Bangladesh) Dhaka Mohammedan	Malé, Maldives
1991	Group Stage	(United Arab Emirates) Al-Shabab	2–1	(Bangladesh) Dhaka Mohammedan	Doha, Qatar
1991	Group Stage	(Thailand) Port Authority	4–1	(Bangladesh) Dhaka Mohammedan	Doha, Qatar
1991	Group Stage	(Qatar) Al Rayyan	3–1	(Bangladesh) Dhaka Mohammedan	Doha, Qatar
1997–98	Qualifying Stage	(South Korea) Pohang Steelers	11–0	(Bangladesh) Dhaka Mohammedan	Seoul, South Korea
1997–98	Qualifying Stage	(Bangladesh) Dhaka Mohammedan	0–2	(South Korea) Pohang Steelers	Dhaka, Bangladesh

==== Brothers Union ====
Season	Round	Team 1	Score	Team 2	Venue
1992–93	Qualifying Stage	(Bangladesh) Brothers Union	0–0	(Pakistan) Wohaib FC	Dhaka, Bangladesh
1992–93	Qualifying Stage	(Pakistan) Wohaib FC	2–0	(Bangladesh) Brothers Union	Lahore, Pakistan

==== Muktijoddha Sangsad ====
Season	Round	Team 1	Score	Team 2	Venue
1999–00	Qualifying Stage	(India) Mohun Bagan	2–1	(Bangladesh) Muktijoddha Sangsad KC	Kolkata, India
1999–00	Qualifying Stage	(Bangladesh) Muktijoddha Sangsad KC	0–0	(India) Mohun Bagan	Dhaka, Bangladesh
2001–02	Qualifying Stage	(Maldives) New Radiant	1–2	(Bangladesh) Muktijoddha Sangsad KC	Maldives
2001–02	Qualifying Stage	(Bangladesh) Muktijoddha Sangsad KC	1–0	(Maldives) New Radiant	Dhaka, Bangladesh
2001–02	Qualifying Stage	(South Korea) Anyang LG Cheetahs	8–0	(Bangladesh) Muktijoddha Sangsad KC	South Korea
2001–02	Qualifying Stage	(Bangladesh) Muktijoddha Sangsad KC	0–3	(South Korea) Anyang LG Cheetahs	Dhaka, Bangladesh

==== Bashundhara Kings ====
Year	Progress	Team 1	Score	Team 2	Venue
2023–24	Preliminary Round	(Bangladesh) Bashundhara Kings	0–2	(United Arab Emirates) Sharjah FC	UAE, Sharjah

== AFC Cup/AFC Champions League Two ==
=== Overview ===
==== Results ====
Team	Appearances	2004	2005	2006	2007–2014	2015	2016	2017	2018	2019	2020	2021	2022	2023–24	2024–25–2026–27
Muktijoddha Sangsad KC	2	GS	GS		DNP										DNP
Brothers Union	2		GS	GS	DNP										DNP
Dhaka Mohammedan	1			GS	DNP										DNP
Sheikh Russel KC	2				DNP	QS		QS							DNP
Sheikh Jamal DC	1				DNP		GS								DNP
Dhaka Abahani	6				DNP			GS	GS	SF^{1}	QS	W/D	QS	QS	DNP
Saif Sporting Club	1				DNP				QS						DNP
Bashundhara Kings	4				DNP						GS	GS	GS	GS	DNP

W: Winners RU: Runners-up SF: Semifinals QF: Quarterfinals R16: Round of 16 GS: Group Stage QS: Qualifying Stage DNP: Did not participate W/D: Withdraw

- ^{1} Inter-zone play-off semi-finals

==== Statistics by club ====
Overall Statistics
#	Team	GP	W	D	L	GF	GA	GD	Best Finish
1	(Bangladesh) Dhaka Abahani	26	8	5	13	31	43	-12	Semifinals (2019)
2	(Bangladesh) Bashundhara Kings	18	8	3	7	24	26	-2	Group Stage (4) (2020, 2021, 2022, 2023–24)
3	(Bangladesh) Sheikh Jamal DC	8	2	1	5	12	21	-9	Group stage (2016)
4	(Bangladesh) Muktijoddha Sangsad KC	12	1	2	9	5	18	-13	Group stage (2) (2004, 2005)
5	(Bangladesh) Brothers Union	10	0	4	6	7	21	-14	Group stage (2) (2005, 2006)
6	(Bangladesh) Sheikh Russel KC	3	0	1	2	4	6	-2	Qualifying stage (2) (2015, 2017)
7	(Bangladesh) Saif Sporting Club	2	0	0	2	1	4	-3	Qualifying stage (2018)
8	(Bangladesh) Dhaka Mohammedan	2	0	0	2	1	9	-8	Group stage (2006)

=== Matches ===
==== Muktijoddha Sangsad ====
Win Draw Loss

Season	Round	Team 1	Score	Team 2	Venue
2004	Group Stage	(Turkmenistan) Nisa Aşgabat	1–0	(Bangladesh) Muktijoddha Sangsad KC	Nisa Stadium, Asgabat, Turkmenistan
2004	Group Stage	(Bangladesh) Muktijoddha Sangsad KC	0–1	(Lebanon) Al-Nejmeh Beirut	Sultan Qaboos Sports Complex, Muscat, Oman
2004	Group Stage	(Yemen) Al Sha'ab Ibb	3–0^{1}	(Bangladesh) Muktijoddha Sangsad KC	King Abdullah Stadium, Amman, jordan
2004	Group Stage	(Bangladesh) Muktijoddha Sangsad KC	2–3	(Yemen) Al Sha'ab Ibb	Camille Chamoun Sports City Stadium, Beirut, Lebanon
2004	Group Stage	(Bangladesh) Muktijoddha Sangsad KC	0–0	(Turkmenistan) Nisa Aşgabat	Sultan Qaboos Sports Complex, Muscat, Oman
2004	Group Stage	(Lebanon) Al-Nejmeh Beirut	2–0	(Bangladesh) Muktijoddha Sangsad KC	Camille Chamoun Sports City Stadium, Beirut, Lebanon
2005	Group Stage	(India) East Bengal F.C.	0–0	(Bangladesh) Muktijoddha Sangsad KC	Salt Lake Stadium, Kolkata, India
2005	Group Stage	(Bangladesh) Muktijoddha Sangsad KC	0–3	(Jordan) Al-Faisaly (Amman)	Bangabandhu National Stadium, Dhaka, Bangladesh
2005	Group Stage	(Turkmenistan) Nebitçi Balkanabat	0–1	(Bangladesh) Muktijoddha Sangsad KC	Balkanabat Stadium, Balkanabat, Turkmenistan
2005	Group Stage	(Bangladesh) Muktijoddha Sangsad KC	1–2	(Turkmenistan) Nebitçi Balkanabat	Bangabandhu National Stadium, Dhaka, Bangladesh
2005	Group Stage	(Bangladesh) Muktijoddha Sangsad KC	0–1	(India) East Bengal F.C.	Bangabandhu National Stadium, Dhaka, Bangladesh
2005	Group Stage	(Jordan) Al-Faisaly (Amman)	2–1	(Bangladesh) Muktijoddha Sangsad KC	Amman International Stadium, Amman, Jordan

^{1}Al Sha'ab Ibb were awarded a 3–0 win as Muktijoddha Sangsad KC did not show up for the match.

==== Brothers Union ====
Season	Round	Team 1	Score	Team 2	Venue
2005	Group Stage	(Bangladesh) Brothers Union	1–1	(Turkmenistan) Nisa Aşgabat	Bangabandhu National Stadium, Dhaka, Bangladesh
2005	Group Stage	(Lebanon) Al-Nejmeh Beirut	4–1	(Bangladesh) Brothers Union	Al Manara Stadium, Beirut, Lebanon
2005	Group Stage	(Turkmenistan) Nisa Aşgabat	0–0	(Bangladesh) Brothers Union	Nisa Stadium, Asgabat, Turkmenistan
2005	Group Stage	(Bangladesh) Brothers Union	0–2	(Lebanon) Al-Nejmeh Beirut	Bangabandhu National Stadium, Dhaka, Bangladesh
2006	Group Stage	(Bahrain) Al-Muharraq	2–0	(Bangladesh) Brothers Union	Bahrain National Stadium, Riffa, Turkmenistan
2006	Group Stage	(Bangladesh) Brothers Union	2–2	(India) Mahindra United	Bangabandhu National Stadium, Dhaka, Bangladesh
2006	Group Stage	(Bangladesh) Brothers Union	1–3	(Lebanon) Al Ahed	Bangabandhu National Stadium, Dhaka, Bangladesh
2006	Group Stage	(Lebanon) Al Ahed	6–2	(Bangladesh) Brothers Union	Beirut Municipal Stadium, Beirut, Lebanon
2006	Group Stage	(Bangladesh) Brothers Union	0–0	(Bahrain) Al-Muharraq	Bangabandhu National Stadium, Dhaka, Bangladesh
2006	Group Stage	(India) Mahindra United	1–0	(Bangladesh) Brothers Union	Jawaharlal Nehru Stadium, Goa, India

==== Dhaka Mohammedan ====
Season	Round	Team 1	Score	Team 2	Venue
2006	Group Stage	(Jordan) Al-Wahdat	7–0	(Bangladesh) Dhaka Mohammedan	Amman International Stadium, Amman, Jordan
2006	Group Stage	(Bangladesh) Dhaka Mohammedan	1–2	(Jordan) Al-Wahdat	Bangabandhu National Stadium, Dhaka, Bangladesh

==== Sheikh Russel ====
Season	Round	Team 1	Score	Team 2	Venue
2015	Qualifying Stage	(Tajikistan) Khayr Vahdat FK	1–0	(Bangladesh) Sheikh Russel KC	Pamir Stadium, Dushanbe, Tajikistan
2017	Qualifying Stage	(Bangladesh) Sheikh Russel KC	1–1	(Chinese Taipei) Tatung F.C.	Changlimithang Stadium, Thimphu, Bhutan
2017	Qualifying Stage	(Bhutan) F.C. Tertons	4–3	(Bangladesh) Sheikh Russel KC	Changlimithang Stadium, Thimphu, Bhutan

==== Sheikh Jamal DC ====
Season	Round	Team 1	Score	Team 2	Venue
2016	Qualifying Stage	(Bangladesh) Sheikh Jamal DC	4–1	Benfica de Macau	Dolen Omurzakov Stadium, Bishkek, Kyrgyzstan
2016	Qualifying Stage	(Kyrgyzstan) FC Alga Bishkek	1–1	(Bangladesh) Sheikh Jamal DC	Dolen Omurzakov Stadium, Bishkek, Kyrgyzstan
2016	Group Stage	(Singapore) Tampines Rovers FC	4–0	(Bangladesh) Sheikh Jamal DC	Jalan Besar Stadium, Kallang, Singapore
2016	Group Stage	(Bangladesh) Sheikh Jamal DC	0–2	(Philippines) Ceres F.C.	Bangabandhu National Stadium, Dhaka, Bangladesh
2016	Group Stage	(Bangladesh) Sheikh Jamal DC	3–4	(Malaysia) Selangor FA	Bangabandhu National Stadium, Dhaka, Bangladesh
2016	Group Stage	(Malaysia) Selangor FA	2–1	(Bangladesh) Sheikh Jamal DC	Selayang Municipal Council Stadium, Selayang, Malaysia
2016	Group Stage	(Bangladesh) Sheikh Jamal DC	3–2	(Singapore) Tampines Rovers FC	Bangabandhu National Stadium, Dhaka, Bangladesh
2016	Group Stage	(Philippines) Ceres F.C.	5–0	(Bangladesh) Sheikh Jamal DC	Panaad Park and Stadium, Bacolod, Philippines

==== Dhaka Abahani ====
Season	Round	Team 1	Score	Team 2	Venue
2017	Group Stage	(Bangladesh) Dhaka Abahani	0–2	(Maldives) Maziya S&RC	Bangabandhu National Stadium, Dhaka, Bangladesh
2017	Group Stage	(India) Mohun Bagan	3–1	(Bangladesh) Dhaka Abahani	Rabindra Sarobar Stadium, Kolkata, India
2017	Group Stage	(India) Bengaluru FC	2–0	(Bangladesh) Dhaka Abahani	Sree Kanteerava Stadium, Bangalore, India
2017	Group Stage	(Bangladesh) Dhaka Abahani	2–0	(India) Bengaluru FC	Bangabandhu National Stadium, Dhaka, Bangladesh
2017	Group Stage	(Maldives) Maziya S&RC	2–0	(Bangladesh) Dhaka Abahani	Rasmee Dhandu Stadium, Malé, Maldives
2017	Group Stage	(Bangladesh) Dhaka Abahani	1–1	(India) Mohun Bagan	Bangabandhu National Stadium, Dhaka, Bangladesh
2018	Group Stage	(Bangladesh) Dhaka Abahani	0–1	(Maldives) New Radiant S.C.	Bangabandhu National Stadium, Dhaka, Bangladesh
2018	Group Stage	(India) Bengaluru FC	1–0	(Bangladesh) Dhaka Abahani	Sree Kanteerava Stadium, Bangalore, India
2018	Group Stage	(India) Aizawl F.C.	0–3	(Bangladesh) Dhaka Abahani	Indira Gandhi Athletic Stadium, Guwahati, India
2018	Group Stage	(Bangladesh) Dhaka Abahani	1–1	(India) Aizawl F.C.	Bangabandhu National Stadium, Dhaka, Bangladesh
2018	Group Stage	(Maldives) New Radiant S.C.	5–1	(Bangladesh) Dhaka Abahani	Rasmee Dhandu Stadium, Malé, Maldives
2018	Group Stage	(Bangladesh) Dhaka Abahani	0–4	(India) Bengaluru FC	Bangabandhu National Stadium, Dhaka, Bangladesh
2019	Group Stage	(Nepal) Manang Marshyangdi Club	0–1	(Bangladesh) Dhaka Abahani	ANFA Complex, Lalitpur, Nepal
2019	Group Stage	(Bangladesh) Dhaka Abahani	2–2	(India) Minerva Punjab F.C.	Bangabandhu National Stadium, Dhaka, Bangladesh
2019	Group Stage	(India) Chennaiyin FC	1–0	(Bangladesh) Dhaka Abahani	The Arena, Ahmedabad, India
2019	Group Stage	(Bangladesh) Dhaka Abahani	3–2	(India) Chennaiyin FC	Bangabandhu National Stadium, Dhaka, Bangladesh
2019	Group Stage	(Bangladesh) Dhaka Abahani	5–0	(Nepal) Manang Marshyangdi Club	Bangabandhu National Stadium, Dhaka, Bangladesh
2019	Group Stage	(India) Minerva Punjab F.C.	0–1	(Bangladesh) Dhaka Abahani	Indira Gandhi Athletic Stadium, Guwahati, India
2019	Inter-zone Semi-final	(Bangladesh) Dhaka Abahani	4–3	(North Korea) 4.25 SC	Bangabandhu National Stadium, Dhaka, Bangladesh
2019	Inter-zone Semi-final	(North Korea) 4.25 SC	2–0	(Bangladesh) Dhaka Abahani	Kim Il-sung Stadium, Pyongyang, North Korea
2020	Group Stage	(Bangladesh) Dhaka Abahani	2–2	(Maldives) Maziya S&RC	Bangabandhu National Stadium, Dhaka, Bangladesh
2020	Group Stage	(Maldives) Maziya S&RC	0–0	(Bangladesh) Dhaka Abahani	National Football Stadium, Malé, Maldives
2022	Qualifying Play-off	(India) Mohun Bagan SG	3–1	(Bangladesh) Dhaka Abahani	Vivekananda Yuba Bharati Krirangan, Kolkata, India
2023–24	Preliminary Round 2	(Bangladesh) Dhaka Abahani	2–1	(Maldives) Club Eagles	Sylhet District Stadium, Dhaka, Bangladesh
2023–24	Qualifying Play-off	(India) Mohun Bagan SG	3–1	(Bangladesh) Dhaka Abahani	Vivekananda Yuba Bharati Krirangan, Kolkata, India

==== Saif SC ====
Season	Round	Team 1	Score	Team 2	Venue
2018	Qualifying Stage	(Bangladesh) Saif Sporting Club	0–1	(Maldives) TC Sports Club	Bangabandhu National Stadium, Dhaka, Bangladesh
2018	Qualifying Stage	(Maldives) TC Sports Club	3–1	(Bangladesh) Saif Sporting Club	Rasmee Dhandu Stadium, Malé, Maldives

==== Bashundhara Kings ====
Season	Round	Team 1	Score	Team 2	Venue
2020	Group Stage	(Bangladesh) Bashundhara Kings	5–1	(Maldives) T.C. Sports Club	Bangabandhu National Stadium, Dhaka, Bangladesh
2021	Group Stage	(Bangladesh) Bashundhara Kings	2–0	(Maldives) Maziya	National Football Stadium, Malé, Maldives
2021	Group Stage	(India) Bengaluru FC	0–0	(Bangladesh) Bashundhara Kings	National Football Stadium, Malé, Maldives
2021	Group Stage	(Bangladesh) Bashundhara Kings	1–1	(India) Mohun Bagan SG	National Football Stadium, Malé, Maldives
2022	Group Stage	(Bangladesh) Bashundhara Kings	1–0	(Maldives) Maziya	Vivekananda Yuba Bharati Krirangan, Kolkata, India
2022	Group Stage	(Bangladesh) Bashundhara Kings	0–4	(India) Mohun Bagan SG	Vivekananda Yuba Bharati Krirangan, Kolkata, India
2022	Group Stage	(Bangladesh) Bashundhara Kings	2–1	(India) Gokulam Kerala FC	Vivekananda Yuba Bharati Krirangan, Kolkata, India
2023–24	Group Stage	(Maldives) Maziya	3–1	(Bangladesh) Bashundhara Kings	National Football Stadium, Malé, Maldives
2023–24	Group Stage	(Bangladesh) Bashundhara Kings	3–2	(India) Odisha	Bashundhara Kings Arena, Dhaka, Bangladesh
2023–24	Group Stage	(India) Mohun Bagan SG	2–2	(Bangladesh) Bashundhara Kings	Kalinga Stadium, Bhubaneswar, India
2023–24	Group Stage	(Bangladesh) Bashundhara Kings	2–1	(India) Mohun Bagan SG	Bashundhara Kings Arena, Dhaka, Bangladesh
2023–24	Group Stage	(Bangladesh) Bashundhara Kings	2–1	(Maldives) Maziya	Bashundhara Kings Arena, Dhaka, Bangladesh
2023–24	Group Stage	(India) Odisha	1–0	(Bangladesh) Bashundhara Kings	Kalinga Stadium, Bhubaneswar, India

== AFC President's Cup/AFC Challenge League ==
=== Overview ===
==== Results ====
Team	Appearances	2005–2007	2008	2009	2010	2011	2012	2013	2014	2024–25	2025–26	2026–27
Dhaka Abahani	6	DNP	GS	GS	GS	GS	GS	–	–	–	QS	–
Sheikh Jamal DC	1	DNP	–	–	–	–	–	W/D	–	–	–	–
Sheikh Russel KC	1	DNP	–	–	–	–	–	–	GS2^{1}	–	–	–
Bashundhara Kings	2	DNP	–	–	–	–	–	–	–	GS	GS	–
Bangladesh Police FC	1	–	–	–	–	–	–	–	–	–	–	QS
Fortis FC	1	–	–	–	–	–	–	–	–	–	–	GS

W: Winners RU: Runners-up SF: Semifinals QF: Quarterfinals R16: Round of 16 GS: Group Stage QS: Qualifying Stage DNP: Did not participate W/D: Withdraw

- ^{1} Final group round

==== Statistics by club ====
Overall Statistics
#	Team	GP	W	D	L	GF	GA	GD	Best Finish
1	(Bangladesh) Dhaka Abahani	15	4	5	6	12	16	-4	Group Stage (5) (2008, 2009, 2010, 2011, 2013)
2	(Bangladesh) Sheikh Russel KC	5	3	1	1	10	4	+6	Final Group Stage (2014)
3	(Bangladesh) Bashundhara Kings	7	1	0	6	4	15	-11	Group Stage (2) (2024–25, 2025–26)
4	(Bangladesh) Fortis FC	1	1	0	0	1	0	1	Group Stage (2026–27)
5	Bangladesh Police FC	1	0	0	1	0	1	-1	Preliminary Stage (2026–27)

=== Matches ===
==== Dhaka Abahani ====
Season	Round	Team 1	Score	Team 2	Venue
2008	Group Stage	Nepal Police Club	4–0	(Bangladesh) Dhaka Abahani	MPPJ Stadium, Selangor, Malaysia
2008	Group Stage	(Bangladesh) Dhaka Abahani	1–2	(Tajikistan) Regar-TadAZ Tursunzoda	MPPJ Stadium, Selangor, Malaysia
2008	Group Stage	(Pakistan) WAPDA FC	0–1	(Bangladesh) Dhaka Abahani	MPPJ Stadium, Selangor, Malaysia
2009	Group Stage	(Bangladesh) Dhaka Abahani	2–1	Sri Lanka Army	Bangabandhu National Stadium, Dhaka, Bangladesh
2009	Group Stage	(Bangladesh) Dhaka Abahani	0–0	(Turkmenistan) FC Aşgabat	Bangabandhu National Stadium, Dhaka, Bangladesh
2010	Group Stage	(Bangladesh) Dhaka Abahani	2–0	(Nepal) New Road Team	Bangabandhu National Stadium, Dhaka, Bangladesh
2010	Group Stage	(Chinese Taipei) Hasus TSU	0–0	(Bangladesh) Dhaka Abahani	Bangabandhu National Stadium, Dhaka, Bangladesh
2010	Group Stage	(Bangladesh) Dhaka Abahani	0–0	(Kyrgyzstan) Dordoi-Dynamo	Bangabandhu National Stadium, Dhaka, Bangladesh
2011	Group Stage	(Kyrgyzstan) Neftchi Kochkor-Ata	2–0	(Bangladesh) Dhaka Abahani	Olympic Stadium, Phnom Penh, Cambodia
2011	Group Stage	(Cambodia) Phnom Penh Crown	1–0	(Bangladesh) Dhaka Abahani	Olympic Stadium, Phnom Penh, Cambodia
2011	Group Stage	(Bangladesh) Dhaka Abahani	4–1	(Sri Lanka) Don Bosco SC	Olympic Stadium, Phnom Penh, Cambodia
2013	Group Stage	(Nepal) Three Star Club	1–1	(Bangladesh) Dhaka Abahani	Dasarath Rangasala Stadium, Kathmandu, Nepal
2013	Group Stage	(Bangladesh) Dhaka Abahani	1–1	(Chinese Taipei) Taiwan Power Company	Dasarath Rangasala Stadium, Kathmandu, Nepal
2013	Group Stage	(Mongolia) Erchim	1–0	(Bangladesh) Dhaka Abahani	Dasarath Rangasala Stadium, Kathmandu, Nepal
2025–26	Preliminary stage	(Bangladesh) Dhaka Abahani	0–2	(Kyrgyzstan) Muras United	Bangabandhu National Stadium, Dhaka, Bangladesh

==== Sheikh Russel KC ====
Season	Round	Team 1	Score	Team 2	Venue
2014	Group Stage	(Pakistan) Khan Research Laboratories	0–0	(Bangladesh) Sheikh Russel KC	Sugathadasa Stadium, Colombo, Sri Lanka
2014	Group Stage	(Bangladesh) Sheikh Russel KC	5–0	Sri Lanka Air Force	Sugathadasa Stadium, Colombo, Sri Lanka
2014	Group Stage	(Bangladesh) Sheikh Russel KC	4–0	(Bhutan) Ugyen Academy	Sugathadasa Stadium, Colombo, Sri Lanka
2014	Final Stage	(Mongolia) Erchim	0–1	(Bangladesh) Sheikh Russel KC	Sugathadasa Stadium, Colombo, Sri Lanka
2014	Final Stage	(Bangladesh) Sheikh Russel KC	0–4	(North Korea) Rimyongsu SC	Sugathadasa Stadium, Colombo, Sri Lanka

==== Bashundhara Kings ====
Season	Round	Team 1	Score	Team 2	Venue
2024–25	Group Stage	(Bangladesh) Bashundhara Kings	0–1	(Lebanon) Nejmeh SC	Changlimithang Stadium, Thimphu, Bhutan
2024–25	Group Stage	(Bangladesh) Bashundhara Kings	0–4	(India) East Bengal	Changlimithang Stadium, Thimphu, Bhutan
2024–25	Group Stage	(Bhutan) Paro FC	2–1	(Bangladesh) Bashundhara Kings	Changlimithang Stadium, Thimphu, Bhutan
2025–26	Preliminary stage	(Syria) Al-Karamah	0–1	(Bangladesh) Bashundhara Kings	Suheim bin Hamad Stadium, Doha, Qatar
2025–26	Group Stage	(Oman) Al-Seeb Club	3–2	(Bangladesh) Bashundhara Kings	Jaber Al-Mubarak Al-Hamad Stadium, Sulaibikhat, Kuwait
2025–26	Group Stage	(Lebanon) Al-Ansar	3–0	(Bangladesh) Bashundhara Kings	Jaber Al-Mubarak Al-Hamad Stadium, Sulaibikhat, Kuwait
2025–26	Group Stage	Al-Kuwait	2–0	(Bangladesh) Bashundhara Kings	Jaber Al-Mubarak Al-Hamad Stadium, Sulaibikhat, Kuwait

==== Bangladesh Police FC ====
Season	Round	Team 1	Score	Team 2	Venue
2026–27	Preliminary stage	(Syria) Al Ittihad	1–0	Bangladesh Police FC	King Abdullah II Stadium, Amman, Jordan

==== Fortis FC ====
Season	Round	Team 1	Score	Team 2	Venue
2026–27	Preliminary stage	(Bangladesh) Fortis FC	1–0	(Kyrgyzstan) Muras United	Bashundhara Kings Arena, Dhaka, Bangladesh
2026–27	Group stage	(Kuwait) Al-Qadsia	–	(Bangladesh) Fortis FC	Mohammed Al-Hamad Stadium, Hawally, Kuwait
2026–27	Group stage	(Bangladesh) Fortis FC	–	(India) Goa	Mohammed Al-Hamad Stadium, Hawally, Kuwait
2026–27	Group stage	(Bangladesh) Fortis FC	–	(Tajikistan) Regar-TadAZ	Mohammed Al-Hamad Stadium, Hawally, Kuwait

== Asian Cup Winners' Cup ==
=== Overview ===
==== Results ====
Team	Appearances	1990–91	1991–92	1992–93	1993–94	1994–95–1995–96	1996–97	1997–98	1998–99–2001–02
Dhaka Mohammedan	5	R2	–	IR	R2	DNP	R2	–	DNP
Dhaka Abahani	2	–	R1	–	–	DNP	–	R2	DNP

W: Winners RU: Runners-up SF: Semifinals QF: Quarterfinals R1: First Round R2: Second Round IR: Intermediate Round DNP: Did not participate W/D: Withdraw

==== Statistics by club ====
Overall Statistics
#	Team	GP	W	D	L	GF	GA	GD	Best Finish
1	(Bangladesh) Dhaka Mohammedan	11	4	6	1	32	19	-13	Intermediate round (1992–93)
2	(Bangladesh) Dhaka Abahani	6	2	1	3	8	4	+4	Second round (1997–98)

=== Matches ===
==== Dhaka Mohammedan ====
Season	Round	Team 1	Score	Team 2	Venue
1990–91	First round	(Bangladesh) Dhaka Mohammedan	W/D	(Sri Lanka) Renown SC	N/A
1990–91	Second round	(Saudi Arabia) Al Hilal	7–0	(Bangladesh) Dhaka Mohammedan	Saudi Arabia
1990–91	Second round	(Bangladesh) Dhaka Mohammedan	1–2	(Saudi Arabia) Al Hilal	Saudi Arabia
1992–93	Intermediate round	(Bangladesh) Dhaka Mohammedan	1–1	(Vietnam) Quảng Nam-Đà Nẵng	N/A
1992–93	Intermediate round	(Bangladesh) Dhaka Mohammedan	0–1	(Vietnam) Quảng Nam-Đà Nẵng	N/A
1993–94	Second round	(Bangladesh) Dhaka Mohammedan	8–0	(Maldives) New Radiant	Dhaka, Bangladesh
1993–94	Second round	(Bangladesh) Dhaka Mohammedan	W/D	(Maldives) New Radiant	Malé, Maldives
1996–97	First round	(Bangladesh) Dhaka Mohammedan	8–0	(Laos) Electricity of Lao	Dhaka, Bangladesh
1996–97	First round	(Laos) Electricity of Lao	1–4	(Bangladesh) Dhaka Mohammedan	Laos
1996–97	Second round	(South Korea) Ulsan Hyundai Horang-i	5–0	(Bangladesh) Dhaka Mohammedan	N/A
1996–97	Second round	(Bangladesh) Dhaka Mohammedan	1–3	(South Korea) Ulsan Hyundai Horang-i	N/A

- ^{1}Renown SC withdrew.
- ^{2}Dhaka Mohammedan withdrew from their away fixture due to financial constraints.

==== Dhaka Abahani ====
Season	Round	Team 1	Score	Team 2	Venue
1991–92	First round	(Bangladesh) Dhaka Abahani	0–0	(India) East Bengal	Dhaka Stadium, Dhaka, Bangladesh
1991–92	First round	(India) East Bengal	1–0	(Bangladesh) Dhaka Abahani	Salt Lake Stadium, Kolkata, India
1997–98	First round	(Sri Lanka) Old Benedictines	0–5	(Bangladesh) Dhaka Abahani	N/A
1997–98	First round	(Sri Lanka) Old Benedictines	0–3	(Bangladesh) Dhaka Abahani	N/A
1997–98	Second round	(Bangladesh) Dhaka Abahani	0–1	(China) Beijing Guoan	Mirpur Stadium, Dhaka, Bangladesh
1997–98	Second round	(China) Beijing Guoan	2–0	(Bangladesh) Dhaka Abahani	Beijing, China

== Head-to-head record ==
Head-to-head records against clubs form 32 nations whom they have played to date only in AFC Competitions.

Against	Region	P	W	D	L	GF	GA	GD	%Win
Bahrain	WAFF	2	0	1	1	0	2	−2	0.00
Bhutan	SAFF	3	1	0	2	8	6	+2	33.33
Cambodia	AFF	1	0	0	1	0	1	−1	0.00
China	EAFF	2	0	0	2	0	3	−3	0.00
Chinese Taipei	EAFF	3	0	3	0	2	2	+0	0.00
India	SAFF	34	8	11	15	33	50	−17	23.53
Iran	CAFF	3	1	1	1	3	3	+0	33.33
Iraq	WAFF	1	0	0	1	1	5	−4	0.00
Jordan	WAFF	4	0	0	4	2	14	−12	0.00
Kyrgyzstan	CAFF	5	1	2	2	2	5	−3	20.00
Laos	AFF	2	2	0	0	12	1	+11	100.00
Lebanon	WAFF	8	0	0	8	4	22	−18	0.00
Macau	EAFF	1	1	0	0	4	1	+3	100.00
Malaysia	AFF	3	0	0	3	5	8	−3	0.00
Maldives	SAFF	22	13	2	7	53	26	+27	59.09
Mongolia	EAFF	2	1	0	1	1	1	+0	50.00
Nepal	SAFF	7	5	1	1	17	8	+9	71.43
North Korea	EAFF	5	2	1	2	5	9	−4	40.00
Pakistan	SAFF	8	4	3	1	12	3	+9	50.00
Philippines	AFF	2	0	0	2	0	7	−7	0.00
Qatar	WAFF	2	0	1	1	3	5	−2	0.00
Saudi Arabia	WAFF	3	0	0	3	2	12	−10	0.00
Singapore	AFF	2	1	0	1	3	6	−3	50.00
South Korea	EAFF	6	0	0	6	1	32	−31	0.00
Sri Lanka	SAFF	8	7	1	0	26	4	+22	87.50
Syria	WAFF	2	1	0	1	1	1	+0	50.00
Tajikistan	CAFF	2	0	0	2	1	3	−2	0.00
Thailand	AFF	2	0	1	1	2	5	−3	0.00
Turkmenistan	CAFF	7	1	4	2	3	4	−1	14.29
United Arab Emirates	WAFF	2	0	0	2	1	4	−3	0.00
Vietnam	AFF	2	0	1	1	1	2	−1	0.00
Yemen	WAFF	1	0	0	1	2	3	−1	0.00
Total	32 nations	154	48	33	73	209	254	−45	31.17

- Last Updated on 12 August 2026

== Goal scorers ==
As of 24 May 2022

Rank	Player	Club	Qualifying stage	Main stage	Total goals
1	(Nigeria) Emeka Onuoha	Sheikh Jamal DC; Dhaka Abahani	2	4	6
2	(Nigeria) Sunday Chizoba	Dhaka Abahani	1	4	5
3	(Argentina) Hernan Barcos	Bashundhara Kings	0	4	4
4	(The Gambia) Landing Darboe	Sheikh Jamal DC	0	4	4
5	(Afghanistan) Masih Saighani	Dhaka Abahani	0	3	3
5	(Bangladesh) Mamunul Islam	Sheikh Jamal DC; Dhaka Abahani	1	2	3
5	(Bangladesh) Nabib Newaj Jibon	Dhaka Abahani	0	3	3
5	(Bangladesh) Shakhawat Hossain Rony	Sheikh Jamal DC; Sheikh Russel KC	3	0	3
5	(Cameroon) Jean Jules Ikanga	Sheikh Russel KC	3	0	3
10	(Bangladesh) Jahid Hasan Ameli	Brothers Union	0	2	2
10	(Bangladesh) Mehedi Hassan Tapu	Brothers Union	0	2	2
10	(Bangladesh) Rubel Miya	Dhaka Abahani	0	2	2
10	(Haiti) Kervens Belfort	Dhaka Abahani	0	2	2
10	(Japan) Seiya Kojima	Dhaka Abahani	0	2	2
10	(The Gambia) Nuha Marong	Bashundhara Kings	0	2	2
10	(Brazil) Robinho	Bashundhara Kings	0	2	2
17	(Costa Rica) Daniel Colindres	Bashundhara Kings	0	1	1
17	(Brazil) Fernandes	Bashundhara Kings	0	1	1

== See also ==
- Football in Bangladesh
- Sport in Bangladesh
