= Farrukh Choriyev =

Tajikistani footballer

Personal information
- Full name: Farrukh Choriyev
- Date of birth: 27 July 1984 (age 42)
- Place of birth: Soviet Union
- Position: Defender

Team information
- Current team: 6

Senior career*
Years	Team	Apps	(Gls)
2005–	Regar-TadAZ		

International career
2006–2011	Tajikistan	15	(1)
- * Club domestic league appearances and goals

Farrukh Choriyev (born 27 July 1984) is a Tajikistani football player, who currently plays for Regar-TadAZ Tursunzoda.

== International career ==
He has been a member of the Tajikistan national football team since 2006.

== Career statistics ==
=== International ===
Appearances and goals by national team and year
National team	Year	Apps	Goals
Tajikistan	2006	1	0
Tajikistan	2007	4	0
Tajikistan	2008	0	0
Tajikistan	2009	1	0
Tajikistan	2010	6	1
Tajikistan	2011	3	0
Total		15	1

Scores and results list Tajikistan's goal tally first, score column indicates score after each Choriyev goal.

List of international goals scored by Farrukh Choriyev
No.	Date	Venue	Opponent	Score	Result	Competition
1	17 November 2010	Central Republican Stadium, Dushanbe, Tajikistan	Afghanistan	1–0	1–0	Friendly

== Honours ==
Regar-TadAZ

- Tajikistan Higher League (3): 2006, 2007, 2008
- Tajikistan Cup (4): 2005, 2006, 2011, 2012
- Tajik Supercup (3): 2011, 2012, 2013
- AFC President's Cup (3): 2005, 2008, 2009

Tajikistan

- AFC Challenge Cup (1): 2006
