= 2007 AFC President's Cup =

Tournament details
- Host country: Pakistan
- Dates: 20–30 September 2007
- Teams: 8 (from 8 associations)
- Venue: 2 (in 1 host city)

Final positions
- Champions: (Kyrgyzstan) Dordoi-Dynamo (2nd title)
- Runners-up: (Nepal) Mahendra Police Club

Tournament statistics
- Matches played: 15
- Goals scored: 66 (4.4 per match)
- Top scorer: (Sri Lanka) Channa Ediri Bandanage (6 goals)
- Best player: (Kyrgyzstan) Valery Kashuba

The 2007 AFC President's Cup was the third edition of the AFC President's Cup, a competition for football clubs in countries categorized as "emerging nations" by the Asian Football Confederation. The eight teams that competed were split up into two groups and play each other team in their group once. The winner of each group then played the runner up in the other group in the semi-finals, and the winners of the semi-final matches played in the final match to determine the winner. There was no third place match. Games were played in Lahore, Pakistan, between 20 and 30 September 2007.

== Venues ==
(Pakistan) Lahore
Punjab Stadium	Railway Stadium
Capacity: 10,000	Capacity: 5,000

== Qualifying teams ==
Association	Team	Qualifying method	App	Last app.
Bhutan	Transport United	2006 A-Division champions	3rd	2006
Cambodia	Khemara Kelia	2006 Cambodian League champions	2nd	2006
Chinese Taipei	Tatung	2006 Intercity Football League champions	2nd	2006
Kyrgyzstan	Dordoi-Dynamoth	2006 Kyrgyzstan League champions	3rd	2006
Nepal	Mehandra Police Club	2006–07 Martyr's Memorial A-Division League champions	1st	none
Pakistan	Pakistan Army	2006–07 Pakistan Premier League champions	2nd	2006
Sri Lanka	Ratnam	2006–07 Kit Premier League champions	2nd	2006
Tajikistan	Regar-TadAZ	2006 Tajik League champions	2nd	2005

== Group stage ==
=== Group A ===
Team	Pld	W	D	L	GF	GA	GD	Pts
(Tajikistan) Regar TadAZ	3	3	0	0	16	1	+15	9
(Sri Lanka) Ratnam Sports Club	3	1	1	1	9	5	+4	4
(Bhutan) Transport United	3	1	0	2	4	21	−17	3
Pakistan Army	3	0	1	2	6	8	−2	1

20 September 2007
20:15

Pakistan Army	3–3	(Sri Lanka) Ratnam Sports Club
Draz 18'; Riaz 45+2'; Shabbir 58'	Report	E.B. Channa 10'; Mohideen 13'; Jayasuriya 43'

Punjab Stadium, Lahore
Attendance: 4,000
Referee: Abdulrahman Recho (Syria)
20 September 2007
23:00

Transport United (Bhutan)	0–13	(Tajikistan) Regar-TadAZ
	Report	Makhmudov 18', 28', 45+2', 61', 76'; Abdullayev 35', 63'; Rustamov 37', 54'; Umarbaev 66'; Barotov 74'; Kholbekov 80'; Rabimov 87'

Punjab Stadium, Lahore
Attendance: 300
Referee: Sgt Win Cho (Myanmar)

22 September 2007
19:30

Regar-TadAZ (Tajikistan)	2–1	Pakistan Army
Abdullayev 65'; Hakimov 68'	Report	Draz 73'

Punjab Stadium, Lahore
Attendance: 800
Referee: Kadhum Auda (Iraq)
22 September 2007
22:15

Ratnam Sports Club (Sri Lanka)	6–1	(Bhutan) Transport United
Mohideen 13'; E.B. Channa 17', 69', 73', 82', 90'	Report	Gyeltshen 42'

Punjab Stadium, Lahore
Attendance: 300
Referee: Mukhtar Al Yarimi (Yemen)

25 September 2007
12:00

Transport United (Bhutan)	3–2	Pakistan Army
Dorji 5', 74'; Jamtsho 27'	Report	Shabbir 45'; Riaz 90+2'

Punjab Stadium, Lahore
Attendance: 200
Referee: Kadhum Auda (Iraq)
25 September 2007
12:00

Regar-TadAZ (Tajikistan)	1–0	(Sri Lanka) Ratnam Sports Club
Abdullayev 66'	Report

Railway Stadium, Lahore
Attendance: 100
Referee: Naser Al-Ghafary (Jordan)

=== Group B ===
Team	Pld	W	D	L	GF	GA	GD	Pts
(Kyrgyzstan) Dordoi-Dynamo	3	3	0	0	12	0	+12	9
(Nepal) Mahendra Police Club	3	1	1	1	6	7	−1	4
(Cambodia) Khemara	3	1	0	2	5	10	−5	3
(Chinese Taipei) Tatung	3	0	1	2	0	6	−6	1

21 September 2007
19:30

Khemara (Cambodia)	0–4	(Kyrgyzstan) Dordoi-Dynamo
	Report	Ishenbaev 14', 36'; Krasnov 34' (pen.), 39'

Punjab Stadium, Lahore
Attendance: 500
Referee: Naser Al-Ghafary (Jordan)
21 September 2007
22:15

Mahendra Police Club (Nepal)	0–0	(Chinese Taipei) Tatung
	Report

Punjab Stadium, Lahore
Attendance: 500
Referee: Vo Minh Tri (Vietnam)

23 September 2007
19:30

Tatung (Chinese Taipei)	0–1	(Cambodia) Khemara
	Report	Sokumpheak 1'

Punjab Stadium, Lahore
Attendance: 500
Referee: Sgt Win Cho (Myanmar)
23 September 2007
22:15

Dordoi-Dynamo (Kyrgyzstan)	3–0	(Nepal) Mahendra Police Club
Kudrenko 23'; Krasnov 33', 59'	Report

Punjab Stadium, Lahore
Attendance: 500
Referee: Vo Minh Tri (Vietnam)

25 September 2007
15:30

Mahendra Police Club (Nepal)	6–4	(Cambodia) Khemara
Thapa 12', 79'; Budhathoki 16'; Pandey 25'; Rai 30'; Rijal 85'	Report	Loch 23'; Chet 68' (pen.); Sokumpheak 70', 78'

Punjab Stadium, Lahore
Attendance: 200
Referee: Abdulrahman Recho (Syria)
25 September 2007
15:30

Tatung (Chinese Taipei)	0–5	(Kyrgyzstan) Dordoi-Dynamo
	Report	Muladjanov 11'; Kornilov 18', 63', 84', 89'

Railway Stadium, Lahore
Attendance: 300
Referee: Mukhtar Al Yarimi (Yemen)

== Knockout stage ==
=== Semi-finals ===
27 September 2007
19:30

Regar-TadAZ (Tajikistan)	1–2	(Nepal) Mahendra Police Club
Rustamov 26'	Report	Rai 32'; Budhathoki 90+1'

Punjab Stadium, Lahore
Attendance: 500
Referee: Vo Minh Tri (Vietnam)

28 September 2007
19:30

Dordoi-Dynamo (Kyrgyzstan)	1–1 (a.e.t.)	(Sri Lanka) Ratnam Sports Club
Tetteh 21'	Report	Jayasuriya 44'
Penalties
	4–3

Punjab Stadium, Lahore
Attendance: 1,000
Referee: Abdulrahman Recho (Syria)

=== Final ===
30 September 2007
19:30

Mahendra Police Club (Nepal)	1–2	(Kyrgyzstan) Dordoi-Dynamo
Rai 90+2' (pen.)	Report	Ishenbaev 8' (pen.); Kornilov 74'

Punjab Stadium, Lahore
Attendance: 2000
Referee: Kadhum Auda (Iraq)

Mahendra Police Club	Dordoi-Dynamo

MAHENDRA POLICE CLUB:
GK	1	Ritesh Thapa
DF	3	Rakesh Shrestha
DF	5	Dipendra Paudel
DF	16	Dipak Paudel	(yellow card) 7'
DF	26	Rabin Shrestha		(substituted off) 68'
MF	7	Parbat Pandey
MF	9	Kunjan Shrestha
MF	12	Arjun Rijal	(yellow card) 67'
MF	15	Anant Thapa
FW	10	Ramesh Budhathoki (c)		(substituted off) 45'
FW	18	Ju Manu Rai	(yellow card) 90+3'
Substitutes:
DF	6	Ganesh Budhathoki		(substituted on) 68'
MF	25	Roshan Karki		(substituted on) 46'
Manager:
(Nepal) Birat Krishna Shrestha

DORDOI-DYNAMO:
GK	16	Valery Kashuba
DF	3	Talant Samsaliev	(yellow card) 64'
DF	4	Ruslan Sydykov (c)
DF	20	Igor Kudrenko
MF	5	Sergey Knyazev	(yellow card) 90+3'
MF	7	Aibek Bokoev		(substituted off) 68'
MF	8	Valery Berezovsky
MF	11	Azamat Ishenbaev		(substituted off) 81'
MF	18	Vadim Kharchenko
FW	15	Andrey Krasnov		(substituted off) 54'
FW	22	David Tetteh
Substitutes:
FW	9	Roman Kornilov		(substituted on) 54'
MF	13	Davron Askarov		(substituted on) 68'
MF	17	Marlen Kasymov		(substituted on) 81'
Manager:
(Kyrgyzstan) Boris Podkorytov

OFFICIALS

- Linesman: Md. Abdul Sarker (Bangladesh)
- Linesman: Jeffrey Goh (Singapore)

AFC President's Cup 2007

Second title

== See also ==
- 2007 AFC Cup
- 2007 AFC Champions League
