= 2009 AFC President's Cup =

Tournament details
- Host country: Tajikistan
- Dates: 12 May – 14 June (group stage); 25–27 September (final stage)
- Teams: 4 (final stage); 11 (total) (from 11 associations)

Final positions
- Champions: (Tajikistan) Regar-TadAZ (3rd title)
- Runners-up: (Kyrgyzstan) Dordoi-Dynamo Naryn

Tournament statistics
- Matches played: 18
- Goals scored: 69 (3.83 per match)
- Top scorer(s): (Myanmar) Soe Min Oo (6 goals)
- Best player: (Tajikistan) Khurshed Mahmudov

The 2009 AFC President's Cup was the fifth edition of the AFC President's Cup, a competition for football clubs in countries categorized as "emerging nations" by the Asian Football Confederation. Eleven teams competed for the title and were split up into three groups, playing each other team in their group once. The winner of each group and the best runner-up qualified for the semifinals, and the winners of the semifinal matches played in the final match to determine the winner.

Each group was to be played over a period of days in May and June at one venue - Group A at Dashrath Stadium, Nepal, Group B at Bangabandhu National Stadium, Dhaka and Group C at Spartak Stadium, Bishkek.

The final stage of the competition took place in Tajikistan from 25–27 September.

== Venues ==
=== Group stage ===
Kathmandu	Dhaka	Bishkek
Dasarath Rangasala Stadium	Bangabandhu National Stadium	Spartak Stadium
Capacity: 17,800	Capacity: 36,000	Capacity: 23,000

=== Final stage ===
(Tajikistan) Tursunzoda
Metallurg Stadium
Capacity: 13,770
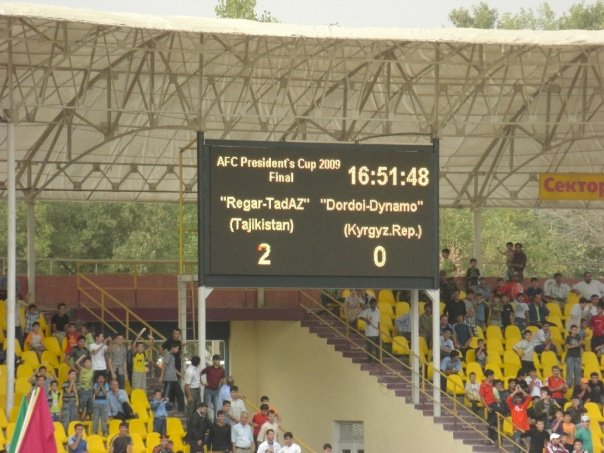

== Qualifying teams ==
Association	Team	Qualifying method	App	Last App
Bangladesh	Abahani Ltd.	2008–09 B.League champions	2nd	2008
Bhutan	Yeedzin FC	2008 A-Division champions	1st	—
Cambodia	Phnom Penh Crown	2008 Cambodian League champions	2nd	2005
Chinese Taipei	Taiwan Power Company	2008 Enterprise Football League champions	3rd	2008
Kyrgyzstan	Dordoi-Dynamo Naryn	2008 Kyrgyzstan League champions	5th	2008
Myanmar	Kanbawza	2008 Myanmar Premier League champions	2nd	2008
Nepal	Nepal Police Club	2006–07 Martyr's Memorial A-Division League champions^{1}	3rd	2008
Pakistan	WAPDA	2008 Pakistan Premier League champions	3rd	2008
Sri Lanka	Sri Lanka Army SC	2008 Sri Lanka Football Premier League champions	1st	—
Tajikistan	Regar-TadAZ	2008 Tajik League champions	4th	2008
Turkmenistan	FC Aşgabat	2008 Turkmenistan League champions	2nd	2008

^{1} No league held in 2008 so 2006–07 champions qualify.

== Group stage ==
=== Group A ===
Pos	Team	Pld	W	D	L	GF	GA	GD	Pts
1	(Tajikistan) Regar-TadAZ	3	1	2	0	5	3	+2	5
2	(Pakistan) WAPDA	3	1	2	0	3	1	+2	5
3	(Chinese Taipei) Taiwan Power Company	3	1	0	2	5	8	−3	3
4	Nepal Police Club	3	0	2	1	4	5	−1	2

- All matches played in Nepal.
- Times listed are UTC+5:45.
14 May 2009
16:00

Regar-TadAZ (Tajikistan)	0–0	(Pakistan) WAPDA
	Report

Dasarath Rangasala Stadium, Nepal
Attendance: 2,000
Referee: Vo Minh Tri (Vietnam)
14 May 2009
18:30

Nepal Police Club	2–3	(Chinese Taipei) Taiwan Power Company
Silwal 21'; Chetan 84'	Report	Feng Pao-hsing 22'; Lin Po-yuan 46'; Lee Meng-chian 57' (pen.)

Dasarath Rangasala Stadium, Nepal
Attendance: 4,000
Referee: Hedayat Mombeni (Iran)

16 May 2009
18:30

Taiwan Power Company (Chinese Taipei)	1–3	(Tajikistan) Regar-TadAZ
Fang Ching-jen 79'	Report	Rabimov 28'; Rustamov 83'; Eminov 85'

Dasarath Rangasala Stadium, Nepal
Attendance: 2,000
Referee: Kenji Ogiya (Japan)
16 May 2009
18:30

WAPDA (Pakistan)	0–0	Nepal Police Club
	Report

Dasarath Rangasala Stadium, Nepal
Attendance: 3,000
Referee: Lee Min-Hu (Korea Republic)

18 May 2009
16:00

Taiwan Power Company (Chinese Taipei)	1–3	(Pakistan) WAPDA
Fang Ching-jen 10'	Report	Mehmood 74', 81'; Akram 89'

Dasarath Rangasala Stadium, Nepal
Attendance: 1,000
Referee: Lee Min-Hu (Korea Republic)
18 May 2009
18:30

Nepal Police Club	2–2	(Tajikistan) Regar-TadAZ
Chetan 28', 64'	Report	Nematov 24'; Rustamov 47'

Dasarath Rangasala Stadium, Nepal
Attendance: 2,000
Referee: Kenji Ogiya (Japan)

=== Group B ===
Pos	Team	Pld	W	D	L	GF	GA	GD	Pts
1	(Turkmenistan) FC Aşgabat	2	1	1	0	5	1	+4	4
2	(Bangladesh) Abahani Ltd.	2	1	1	0	2	1	+1	4
3	Sri Lanka Army	2	0	0	2	2	7	−5	0

- All matches played in Bangladesh.
- Times listed are UTC+6.
12 May 2009
18:00

Sri Lanka Army	1–2	(Bangladesh) Abahani Ltd.
Yussif 43' (o.g.)	Report	Faisal 41'; Tipu 73'

Bangabandhu National Stadium
Attendance: 3,500
Referee: Naser Al-Ghafary (Jordan)

14 May 2009
18:00

FC Aşgabat (Turkmenistan)	5–1	Sri Lanka Army
Mirzoýew 2', 37'; Amanow 50', 86'; Urazow 74'	Report	Priyankara 58'

Bangabandhu National Stadium
Attendance: 2,500
Referee: Fan Qi (China)

16 May 2009
18:00

Abahani Ltd. (Bangladesh)	0–0	(Turkmenistan) FC Aşgabat
	Report

Bangabandhu National Stadium
Attendance: 8,700
Referee: Mohammad Abu Loum (Jordan)

=== Group C ===
Pos	Team	Pld	W	D	L	GF	GA	GD	Pts
1	(Kyrgyzstan) Dordoi-Dynamo Naryn	3	3	0	0	12	2	+10	9
2	(Myanmar) Kanbawza	3	2	0	1	9	7	+2	6
3	(Cambodia) Phnom Penh Crown	3	1	0	2	7	8	−1	3
4	(Bhutan) Yeedzin FC	3	0	0	3	3	14	−11	0

- All matches played in Kyrgyzstan.
- Times listed are UTC+6.
10 June 2009
18:00

Dordoi-Dynamo Naryn (Kyrgyzstan)	7–0	(Bhutan) Yeedzin FC
Murzaev 2', 15' (pen.), 65', 79'; Tetteh 29', 87'; Mulajanov 46'	Report

Spartak Stadium, Kyrgyzstan
Attendance: 7,500
Referee: Vladislav Tseytlin (Uzbekistan)
10 June 2009
14:30

Kanbawza (Myanmar)	4–3	(Cambodia) Phnom Penh Crown
Soe Min Oo 7', 38', 44'; Khin Maung Lwin 37'	Report	Mpoko 20'; Lappé-Lappé 21' (pen.), 30',

Spartak Stadium, Kyrgyzstan
Attendance: 500
Referee: Nawaf Shukralla (Bahrain)

12 June 2009
18:00

Phnom Penh Crown (Cambodia)	1–3	(Kyrgyzstan) Dordoi-Dynamo Naryn
Lappé-Lappé 33'	Report	Tetteh 45'; Murzaev 47'; Sydykov 79'

Spartak Stadium, Kyrgyzstan
Attendance: 8,000
Referee: Nawaf Shukralla (Bahrain)
12 June 2009
14:30

Yeedzin FC (Bhutan)	2–4	(Myanmar) Kanbawza
Chophel 10'; Tenzin 31'	Report	Rinchen 38' (o.g.); Soe Min Oo 38', 81'; Win Min Htut 78'

Spartak Stadium, Kyrgyzstan
Attendance: 150
Referee: Kakabaý Seýidow (Turkmenistan)

14 June 2009
16:30

Phnom Penh Crown (Cambodia)	3–1	(Bhutan) Yeedzin FC
Lappé-Lappé 22', 63'; C. Rithy 43'	Report	Tschedupla 40'

Spartak Stadium, Kyrgyzstan
Attendance: 300
Referee: Vladislav Tseytlin (Uzbekistan)
14 June 2009
18:00

Dordoi-Dynamo Naryn (Kyrgyzstan)	2–1	(Myanmar) Kanbawza
Tetteh 28'; Amirov 38'	Report	Soe Min Oo 3'

Spartak Stadium, Kyrgyzstan
Attendance: 8,500
Referee: Kakabaý Seýidow (Turkmenistan)

=== Best runner-up ===
The best runners-up team from among the three pools qualify for the semi-finals. Because group B consists of only three teams, matches against fourth-placed sides in the other groups are excluded from the following comparison.

Pos	Grp	Team	Pld	W	D	L	GF	GA	GD	Pts
1	A	(Pakistan) WAPDA	2	1	1	0	3	1	+2	4
2	B	(Bangladesh) Abahani Ltd.	2	1	1	0	2	1	+1	4
3	C	(Myanmar) Kanbawza	2	1	0	1	5	5	0	3

Note on tie-breaking situation:

- WAPDA placed ahead of Abahani Ltd. on the basis of goal difference.

== Final stage ==
- Times listed are UTC+5.

=== Semi-finals ===
25 September 2009
11:30

Dordoi-Dynamo Naryn (Kyrgyzstan)	2–1	(Turkmenistan) FC Aşgabat
Samsaliev 31'; Harchenko 46'	Report	Muhadow 54'

Metallurg Stadium, Tajikistan
Attendance: 2,500
Referee: Mohammad Abu Loum (Jordan)

25 September 2009
16:00

Regar-TadAZ (Tajikistan)	4–3 (a.e.t.)	(Pakistan) WAPDA
Rabimov 74'; M. Rustamov 90+1', 113'; H. Rustamov 106'	Report	Zulfiqar 42'; Mehmood 84'; Bakhsh 103'

Metallurg Stadium, Tajikistan
Attendance: 6,000
Referee: Nawaf Shukralla (Bahrain)

=== Final ===
27 September 2009
15:00

Regar-TadAZ (Tajikistan)	2–0	(Kyrgyzstan) Dordoi-Dynamo Naryn
Rabimov 7'; Mahmudov 55'	Report

Metallurg Stadium, Tajikistan
Attendance: 10,000
Referee: Alireza Faghani (Iran)

AFC President's Cup 2009

Third title
