= Shujoat Nematov =

Tajikistani footballer

Şuçoat Ne'matov
Personal information
- Full name: Şuçoat Ne'matov
- Date of birth: 26 September 1981 (age 45)
- Position: Striker

Senior career*
| Years | Team | Apps | (Gls) |
| 2005–2009 | Regar-TadAZ | | |

International career^{‡}
| 2003–2006 | Tajikistan | 8 | (1) |
- * Club domestic league appearances and goals as of 22 October 2015 ‡ National team caps and goals as of 22 October 2015

Şuçoat Ne'matov (born 26 September 1981) is a Tajikistani footballer whose last known club was Regar-TadAZ Tursunzoda.

== Career ==
=== International ===
Nematov was included in the Tajikistan national football team for having won the 2006 AFC Challenge Cup.

== Career statistics ==
=== International ===
Tajikistan national team
| Year | Apps | Goals |
|---|---|---|
| 2003 | 3 | 0 |
| 2004 | 0 | 0 |
| 2005 | 0 | 0 |
| 2006 | 5 | 1 |
| Total | 8 | 1 |

Statistics accurate as of 22 October 2015

=== International goals ===
As of 22 October 2015

| # | Date | Venue | Opponent | Score | Result | Competition |
|---|---|---|---|---|---|---|
| 1 | 10 April 2006 | Dhaka, Bangladesh | Bangladesh | 6–1 | 6–1 | 2006 AFC Challenge Cup |

== Honours ==
Regar-TadAZ

- Tajik League (3): 2006, 2007, 2008
- Tajik Cup (2): 2005, 2006
- AFC President's Cup (3): 2005, 2008, 2009

Tajikistan

- AFC Challenge Cup (1): 2006
