= Valery Kashuba =

Kyrgyzstani footballer (born 1984)

Personal information
- Full name: Valery Yuryevich Kashuba
- Date of birth: 14 September 1984 (age 42)
- Place of birth: Belovodskoye, Kirghiz SSR, Soviet Union
- Height: 1.85 m (6 ft 1 in)
- Position: Goalkeeper

Team information
- Current team: Dordoi Bishkek
- Number: 1

Senior career*
Years	Team	Apps	(Gls)
2000–2002	Dordoi-Dynamo Naryn	12	(0)
2003–2005	SKA-Shoro Bishkek	7	(0)
2006–2007	Dordoi-Dynamo Naryn		
2008–2009	Abdish-Ata Kant		
2010	Alga Bishkek		
2011	Ak Bulak	22	(0)
2012–2014	Alay Osh		
2015	Khujand		
2016–	Dordoi Bishkek		

International career^{‡}
2004–	Kyrgyzstan	23	(0)
- * Club domestic league appearances and goals as of 4 December 2017 ‡ National team caps and goals as of 15 June 2021

Valery Yuryevich Kashuba (Russian: Валерий Юрьевич Кашуба; born 14 September 1984) is a Kyrgyzstani footballer who is a goalkeeper for Dordoi Bishkek in the Kyrgyzstan League. He is an occasional member of the Kyrgyzstan national football team. His first and only cap was a friendly match against Kuwait national football team in 2004. His most recent call up to the national team was on 18 February 2004 in a preliminary match against Tajikistan national football team for the 2006 FIFA World Cup. Kashuba was named Kyrgyzstan goalkeeper of the year in 2006.

== Coaching career ==
In January 2022, Dordoi Bishkek announced that Kashuba had been appointed as a player-coach, and would assist the goalkeeping coaches whilst still being registered as a player at the club.

== Career statistics ==
=== International ===
Kyrgyzstan national team
Year	Apps	Goals
2004	1	0
2006	1	0
2007	5	0
2011	1	0
2014	2	0
2015	2	0
2016	6	0
2017	1	0
2018	2	0
Total	21	0

Statistics accurate as of match played 29 May 2018

== Honors ==
=== Club ===
SKA-PVO Bishkek

- Kyrgyzstan Cup (1): 2003

Dordoi Bishkek

- Kyrgyzstan League (2); 2006, 2007
- Kyrgyzstan Cup (1): 2006
- AFC President's Cup (1): 2007

Abdish-Ata Kant

- Kyrgyzstan Cup (1): 2009

Alay Osh

- Kyrgyzstan League (1); 2013
- Kyrgyzstan Cup (1): 2013
