= Ziyad Al-Kord =

Palestinian footballer

Personal information
- Full name: Ziyad Saeed Al-Kord bin Samir
- Date of birth: 15 January 1974 (age 52)
- Place of birth: Gaza, Palestine
- Height: 1.83 m (6 ft 0 in)
- Position: Striker

Youth career
- 1994–1996: Al-Ahly Nasreiyat

Senior career*
Years	Team	Apps	(Gls)
1996–1999	Al-Ahly Nasreiyat	90	(88)
1999–2000	Al-Hussein (Irbid)	14	(10)
2003	Abha		(11)
2004–2006	Al-Wahdat	30	(15)
2006–2009	Al-Ahly Nasreiyat		
2009–2010	Gaza Sport		

International career^{‡}
1998–2006	Palestine	30	(14)
- * Club domestic league appearances and goals as of 21:27, 21 August 2010 (UTC) ‡ National team caps and goals as of 14:20, 28 July 2010 (UTC)

Ziyad Saeed Al-Kord bin Samir, known simply as Ziyad Al-Kord (Arabic: زياد الكرد; born 15 January 1974 in Gaza), is a Palestinian footballer who has played with various clubs in the Palestinian territories, Jordan, and Saudi Arabia.

He is Palestine's second all-time leading scorer behind Fahed Attal with 10 goals in 30 games. He is the first Palestinian player to have played professionally in Saudi Arabia.

== International goals ==
Scores and results list the Palestine's goal tally first.

#	Date	Venue	Opponent	Score	Result	Competition
1.	26 July 1998	Beirut, Lebanon	Syria	1–2	1–2	Friendly
2.	27 August 1999	Amman, Jordan	Syria	1–1	1–1	1999 Pan Arab Games
3.	29 August 1999	Amman, Jordan	Jordan	1–4	1–4	1999 Pan Arab Games
4.	4 April 2002	Kuwait City, Kuwait	Iran	2–1	2–2	2002 West Asian Games (unofficial)
5.	6 April 2002	Kuwait City, Kuwait	Qatar	1–0	2–0	2002 West Asian Games (unofficial)
6.	6 April 2002	Kuwait City, Kuwait	Qatar	2–0	2–0	2002 West Asian Games (unofficial)
7.	16 December 2002	Kuwait City, Kuwait	Jordan	1–0	1–1	2002 Arab Nations Cup
8.	20 December 2002	Kuwait City, Kuwait	Morocco	1–2	1–3	2002 Arab Nations Cup (unofficial)
9.	23 December 2002	Kuwait City, Kuwait	Sudan	2–1	2–2	2002 Arab Nations Cup
10.	18 February 2004	Doha, Qatar	Chinese Taipei	1–0	8–0	2006 World Cup Qualifier
11.	17 June 2004	Tehran, Iran	Jordan	1–1	1–1	2004 WAFF Championship
12.	19 June 2004	Tehran, Iran	Iraq	1–0	1–2	2004 WAFF Championship
13.	1 April 2006	Dhaka, Bangladesh	Guam	9–0	11–0	2006 AFC Challenge Cup
14.	1 April 2006	Dhaka, Bangladesh	Guam	10–0	11–0	2006 AFC Challenge Cup
