= Tashi Tsering (footballer) =

Nepalese footballer

Personal information
- Full name: Tashi Tsering
- Date of birth: 22 April 1973 (age 53)
- Place of birth: Kathmandu, Nepal
- Position: Defender

Senior career*
Years	Team	Apps	(Gls)
2002–2009	Manang Marsyangdi		

International career
1999	Tibet		
2005	Nepal	7	(1)
- * Club domestic league appearances and goals

Tashi Tsering (Nepali: तासी छिरिङ) (Tibetan: བཀྲ་ཤིས་ཚེ་རིང་, Wylie: Bkra-shis Tse-ring; also written Tashi Chirring) is a Nepalese former footballer of Tibetan descent. The defender has played for the Tibet national football team in 1999 and the Nepal national football team in 2005.

== Club career ==
Tsering has played for Manang Marsyangdi for several years and was noted for his strong performances for the club in the AFC President's Cup 2006.

== International career ==
Tsering has appeared for Nepal in two qualifiers for the 2010 FIFA World Cup Qualifiers. He also appeared in five matches for Nepal, scoring once, at the 2006 AFC Challenge Cup, where he played in the semi-final as Nepal lost to Sri Lanka on penalties.

== See also ==
- Tibet national football team
- Tibetan culture
