= Ahmed Keshkesh =

Palestinian footballer

Personal information
- Date of birth: 15 September 1984 (age 42)
- Place of birth: Gaza, Palestine
- Height: 1.78 m (5 ft 10 in)
- Positions: Attacking midfielder; forward

Youth career
- Hilal Gaza

Senior career*
| Years | Team | Apps | (Gls) |
| –2008 | Hilal Gaza | | |
| 2008 | Shabab Al-Am'ari | 21 | (14) |
| 2009 | Shabab Al-Ordon (loan) | | (0) |
| 2009–2011 | Al-Wahdat | | (21) |
| 2011–2013 | Shabab Al-Am'ari | | |

International career^{‡}
| 2004–2011 | Palestine | 25 | (5) |
- * Club domestic league appearances and goals as of 14:22, 4 June 2011 (UTC) ‡ National team caps and goals as of 17:08, 29 June 2011 (UTC)

Ahmed Keshkesh (Arabic: أحمد كشكش; born 15 September 1984 in Gaza) is a Palestinian professional footballer currently playing for Markaz Shabab Al-Am'ari of the West Bank Premier League.

== Club career ==
His performance against Jordan, earned him a loan moved to Shabab Al-Ordon of the Jordanian Premier League but a permanent move failed to materialize due to Keshkesh being absent on national team duty for most of the loan period. The following season saw him unexpectedly sign for Jordanian Al-Wahdat his first season he was used mostly as a substitute. He only managed five league goals in his first season.

In the 2010–11 season Keskesh saw less playing time he still managed two league goals and scored in the Jordan FA Cup Final against Manshia Bani Hassan under manager Dragan Talajic. His two-year career with Al-Wahdat saw him score in every competition Al-Wahdat took part in scoring one goal in the 2009 Jordanian Super Cup, one goal in the 2010 AFC Cup, 7 goals in the league over two seasons, 9 goals in the Jordan FA Cup over two seasons, and 4 goals in the Jordanian Shield for a total of 21. On 4 June 2011, he signed a contract with his former West Bank Premier League club Markaz Shabab Al-Am'ari .

== International career ==
He is perhaps best known for scoring the first goal in a historic encounter between Palestine and Jordan that marked the first time Palestine hosted an international match on home soil.

=== International goals ===
Scores and results list the Palestine' goal tally first.

| # | Date | Venue | Opponent | Score | Result | Competition |
|---|---|---|---|---|---|---|
| 1. | 18 February 2004 | Al-Wakrah Stadium, Doha, Qatar | Chinese Taipei | 7–0 | 8–0 | 2006 World Cup qualifier |
| 2. | 1 April 2006 | Bangabandhu National Stadium, Dhaka, Bangladesh | Guam | 1–0 | 11–0 | 2006 AFC Challenge Cup |
| 3. | 3 April 2006 | Bangabandhu National Stadium, Dhaka, Bangladesh | Cambodia | 1–0 | 4–0 | 2006 AFC Challenge Cup |
| 4. | 26 October 2008 | Faisal Al-Husseini International Stadium, Al-Ram, Palestine | Jordan | 1–0 | 1–1 | Friendly |
| 5. | 18 July 2009 | TEDA Football Stadium, Tianjin, China | China | 1–3 | 1–3 | Friendly |
