= Ismail Al-Amour =

Palestinian footballer

Personal information
- Date of birth: October 2, 1984 (age 42)
- Place of birth: Gaza City, Gaza Strip
- Height: 5 ft 6 in (1.68 m)
- Position: Midfielder

Team information
- Current team: Shabab Alsamu
- Number: 10

Youth career
- El-Meshtal

Senior career*
Years	Team	Apps	(Gls)
2002–2010	El-Meshtal		
2009–2010	→ Shabab Al-Dhahrieh (loan)		
2010–2011	Jabal Al Mukaber		
2011–2012	Al-Am'ary		
2012–2013	Al-Yarmouk	2	(1)
2013	Al-Muharraq	5	(0)
2013–2014	Jabal Al Mukaber	11	(0)
2014–2015	Hilal Al-Quds	12	(1)
2015–2017	Shabab Alsamu		
2017	Al-Am'ary		
2018–	Shabab Alsamu		

International career
2005–2015	Palestine	45	(7)
- * Club domestic league appearances and goals

Ismail Al-Amour (Arabic: إسماعيل العمور; born 2 October 1984) is a Palestinian footballer currently playing for Shabab Alsamu of the West Bank Premier League as a midfielder.

== International goals ==
Scores and results list Palestine's goal tally first.

#	Date	Venue	Opponent	Score	Result	Competition
1.	1 April 2006	Bangabandhu National Stadium, Dhaka	Guam	5–0	11–0	2006 AFC Challenge Cup
2.	9 September 2006	Sheikh Khalifa International Stadium, Al Ain	Iraq	2–2	2–2	2007 AFC Asian Cup qualifier
3.	10 October 2009	Za'abeel Stadium, Dubai	United Arab Emirates	1–0	1–1	Friendly
4.	29 June 2011	Stadium Metallurg 1st District, Tursunzoda	Afghanistan	2–0	2–0	2014 FIFA World Cup qualifier
5.	17 December 2011	Ahmed bin Ali Stadium, Al Rayyan	Sudan	2–0	2–0	2011 Pan Arab Games
6.	18 June 2012	Ali Mohsen Al-Muraisi Stadium, Sana'a	Yemen	2–1	2–1	Friendly
7.	28 June 2012	King Fahd Stadium, Ta'if	Saudi Arabia	2–1	2–2	2012 Arab Nations Cup
