= Mehedi Hassan Tapu =

Bangladeshi footballer

Personal information
- Full name: Mehedi Hassan Tapu
- Date of birth: 25 September 1984 (age 42)
- Place of birth: Narayanganj, Bangladesh
- Height: 1.73 m (5 ft 8 in)
- Position: Centre forward

Senior career*
Years	Team	Apps	(Gls)
1999–2003	Dhanmondi Club		
2003–2011	Brothers Union		
2003	→ Chittagong Mohammedan (loan)		
2011–2012	Dhaka Mohammedan		
2012–2019	Team BJMC		

International career^{‡}
2006	Bangladesh U23		
2006–2011	Bangladesh	4	(1)
- * Club domestic league appearances and goals ‡ National team caps and goals as of 6 September 2016

Mehedi Hassan Tapu is a Bangladeshi footballer who plays as a centre forward. He last played for Team BJMC in Bangladesh Premier League, before the club was defunct in 2019. He scored his first international goal against Palestine during 2006 AFC Challenge Cup.
