= Roman Ablakimov =

Kyrgyzstani footballer (born 1987)

Personal information
- Full name: Roman Borisovich Ablakimov
- Date of birth: 28 August 1987 (age 39)
- Place of birth: Soviet Union
- Position: Midfielder

Team information
- Current team: Sunkar

Senior career*
Years	Team	Apps	(Gls)
2005	SKA-Shoro Bishkek		
2006	Neftchi Kochkor-Ata		
2007–2008	Dordoi-Dynamo Naryn		
2009–2012	Abdish-Ata Kant		
2013	Ak Bulak	33	(5)
2014	Gefest	8	(0)
2014–	Sunkar	3	(0)

International career^{‡}
2006–	Kyrgyzstan	4	(1)
- * Club domestic league appearances and goals as of 1 December 2014 ‡ National team caps and goals as of 1 December 2014

Roman Borisovich Ablakimov (Russian: Роман Борисович Аблакимов; born 28 August 1987) is a Kyrgyzstani footballer who is a midfielder for Sunkar and the Kyrgyzstan national football team.

== International goals ==
#	Date	Venue	Opponent	Score	Result	Competition
	7 April 2006	Dhaka, Bangladesh	Macau	2–0	Won	2006 AFC Challenge Cup
