= Roman Kornilov =

Kyrgyzstani footballer

Personal information
- Full name: Roman Kornilov
- Date of birth: 30 March 1981 (age 45)
- Place of birth: Kirghiz Soviet Socialist Republic
- Position: Forward

Team information
- Current team: Sher-Ak-Dan Bishkek

Senior career*
Years	Team	Apps	(Gls)
1998	Dinamo-Asia-Karavan		
1999	Guardia Bishkek		
2000	Dinamo Bishkek		
2001	Erkin Farm Bishkek		
2001–2003	SKA-PVO Bishkek		
2004–2005	SKA-Shoro Bishkek		
2006–2007	Dordoi-Dynamo Naryn		
2008	Sher-Ak-Dan Bishkek		

International career^{‡}
2003–2008	Kyrgyzstan	20	(1)
- * Club domestic league appearances and goals as of 29 January 2010 ‡ National team caps and goals as of 29 January 2010

Roman Kornilov (born 30 March 1981) is a retired Kyrgyzstani international footballer who last played for Sher-Ak-Dan Bishkek, as a forward. Kornilov notably formerly played for SKA-Shoro Bishkek and Dordoi-Dynamo Naryn. He has made 20 appearances for the Kyrgyzstan national football team since 2003, scoring one goal.

== International goals ==
#	Date	Venue	Opponent	Score	Result	Competition
1.	9 May 2008	Bishkek, Kyrgyzstan	Bangladesh	1–1	2–1	2008 AFC Challenge Cup qualification
