= 2006 AFC Challenge Cup =

Tournament details
- Host country: Bangladesh
- Dates: 1–16 April
- Venues: 3 (in 2 host cities)

Final positions
- Champions: Tajikistan (1st title)
- Runners-up: Sri Lanka

Tournament statistics
- Matches played: 31
- Goals scored: 82 (2.65 per match)
- Attendance: 150,150 (4,844 per match)
- Top scorer: (Palestine) Fahed Attal (8 goals)
- Best player: (Tajikistan) Ibrahim Rabimov

The 2006 AFC Challenge Cup was held between 1 and 16 April 2006 in Bangladesh. Sixteen teams were split into four groups, the top two in each group qualifying for the quarterfinals, and from then on a straight knockout contest. There was no qualification stage. The cup winner was Tajikistan. The fair play award was won by Sri Lanka and Tajik Ibrahim Rabimov won the most valuable player award.

== Selection of teams ==
The AFC classed seventeen nations as emerging associations, which need time to develop their football. They were selected in August 2005 to take part. Laos, Mongolia, and Timor-Leste were initially selected to participate, but were later replaced by Bangladesh and India of the developing associations class, reducing the number of participating teams to sixteen.

- Afghanistan
- Bhutan
- Brunei
- Cambodia
- Chinese Taipei
- Guam
- Kyrgyzstan
- Laos (Removed)
- Macau
- Mongolia (Removed)
- Nepal
- Pakistan
- Palestine
- Philippines
- Sri Lanka
- Tajikistan
- Timor-Leste (Removed)

Replacements

- Bangladesh
- India U20

== Host and stadiums ==
The AFC decided at its annual meeting, that Bangladesh would host the opening ceremony and that Nepal would host the final unless Bangladesh makes it into the last two, in which case it would be held in Dhaka, its capital. It was originally planned that the teams in Groups A and B would play their games in Nepal and that teams in Groups C and D would play in Bangladesh, but due to the political unrest that shook Nepal, it was decided that only Bangladesh would host the tournament. The Challenge Cup was originally scheduled to take place between 26 March to 9 April 2006 but was changed to avoid clashes with Bangladesh's Independence Day on 26 March. The two stadia that were selected to be used during this tournament were: the Bangabandhu Stadium in Dhaka and the MA Aziz Stadium in Chittagong. However, the Bangladesh Army Stadium in Dhaka was later used to make-up the matches that were abandoned due to heavy rain.

== Venues ==
Dhaka		Chittagong
Bangabandhu National Stadium	Bangladesh Army Stadium	M. A. Aziz Stadium
Capacity: 36,000	Capacity: 20,000	Capacity: 40,000
2006 AFC Challenge Cup is located in Bangladesh

== Teams ==
Some teams did not take part with their 'main' national squad, as noted below:

- India decided to field their under-20 team in preparation for the AFC Youth Championship they were later hosting.
- Kyrgyzstan took part with a young squad, made up mostly of players from their under-20 team which had qualified for the AFC Youth Championship.

== Group stage ==
All times are Bangladesh Standard Time (BST) – UTC+6

Key to colours in group tables
Top two placed teams advance to the quarter-finals

=== Tie-breaking criteria ===
Where two or more teams end the group stage with the same number of points, their ranking is determined by the following criteria:

1. points earned in the matches between the teams concerned;
2. goal difference in the matches between the teams concerned;
3. number of goals scored in the group matches between the teams concerned;
4. goal difference in all group matches;
5. number of goals scored in all group matches;
6. kicks from the penalty mark (if only two teams are level and they are both on the field of play);
7. fewer yellow and red cards received in the group matches;
8. drawing of lots by the organising committee.

=== Group A ===
Team	Pld	W	D	L	GF	GA	GD	Pts
India U20	3	1	2	0	3	1	+2	5
Chinese Taipei	3	1	2	0	3	2	+1	5
Philippines	3	0	2	1	2	3	−1	2
Afghanistan	3	0	2	1	3	5	−2	2

Source: RSSSF
1 April 2006
15:30

India U20	2–0	Afghanistan
Vimal 35', 60'	Report

MA Aziz Stadium, Chittagong
Attendance: 2,500
Referee: Mahmood Al-Ghatrifi (Oman)
1 April 2006
18:00

Chinese Taipei	1–0	Philippines
Chuang Wei-lun 20'	Report

MA Aziz Stadium, Chittagong
Attendance: 4,000
Referee: Lee Gi-Young (Korea Republic)

3 April 2006
15:30

Philippines	1–1	India U20
Valeroso 19'	Report	Vimal 8'

MA Aziz Stadium, Chittagong
Attendance: 2,000
Referee: Salem Mujghef (Jordan)
3 April 2006
18:00

Afghanistan	2–2	Chinese Taipei
Qadami 20', 23'	Report	Chuang Wei-lun 48'; Liang Chien-wei 73'

MA Aziz Stadium, Chittagong
Attendance: 2,500
Referee: Lee Gi-Young (Korea Republic)

5 April 2006
15:30

India U20	0–0	Chinese Taipei
	Report

MA Aziz Stadium, Chittagong
Attendance: 2,000
Referee: Ram Krishna Gosh (Bangladesh)
5 April 2006
18:00

Philippines	1–1	Afghanistan
Valeroso 59'	Report	Maqsood 28'

MA Aziz Stadium, Chittagong
Attendance: 3,000
Referee: Salem Mujghef (Jordan)

=== Group B ===
Team	Pld	W	D	L	GF	GA	GD	Pts
Sri Lanka	3	2	1	0	3	1	+2	7
Nepal	3	1	1	1	4	3	+1	4
Brunei	3	1	1	1	2	2	0	4
Bhutan	3	0	1	2	0	3	−3	1

Source: RSSSF
2 April 2006
15:30

Sri Lanka	1–0	Brunei
Kasun 74'	Report

MA Aziz Stadium, Chittagong
Attendance: 2,000
Referee: Rustam Saidov (Uzbekistan)
2 April 2006
18:00

Nepal	2–0	Bhutan
Pradeep 52', 68'	Report

MA Aziz Stadium, Chittagong
Attendance: 3,500
Referee: Ram Krishna Gosh (Bangladesh)

4 April 2006
15:30

Bhutan	0–1	Sri Lanka
	Report	Karu 45'

MA Aziz Stadium, Chittagong
Attendance: 0
Referee: Rustam Saidov (Uzbekistan)
4 April 2006
18:00

Brunei	2–1	Nepal
Adie 11'; Riwandi 42'	Report	Tashi 60'

MA Aziz Stadium, Chittagong
Attendance: 2,500
Referee: Mahmood Al-Ghatrifi (Oman)

6 April 2006
15:30

Sri Lanka	1–1	Nepal
Izzadeen 19'	Report	Pradeep 75' (pen.)

MA Aziz Stadium, Chittagong
Attendance: 2,500
Referee: Lee Gi-Young (Korea Republic)
6 April 2006
18:00

Bhutan	0–0	Brunei
	Report

MA Aziz Stadium, Chittagong
Attendance: 2,000
Referee: Mahmood Al-Ghatrifi (Oman)

=== Group C ===
Team	Pld	W	D	L	GF	GA	GD	Pts
Palestine	3	2	1	0	16	1	+15	7
Bangladesh (H)	3	2	1	0	6	2	+4	7
Cambodia	3	1	0	2	4	6	−2	3
Guam	3	0	0	3	0	17	−17	0

Source: RSSSF
(H) Hosts
1 April 2006
15:30

Palestine	11–0	Guam
Keshkesh 6'; Attal 14', 20', 25', 32', 45+1', 86'; Atura 22'; Al Amour 39'; Al-Kord 59', 67'	Report

Bangabandhu Stadium, Dhaka
Attendance: 3,000
Referee: Ala Abdul Kadir Nema (Iraq)
1 April 2006
18:00

Bangladesh	2–1	Cambodia
Alfaz 31'; Ameli 64'	Report	C. Rithy 68'

Bangabandhu Stadium, Dhaka
Attendance: 35,000
Referee: Tan Hai (China PR)

3 April 2006
15:30

Cambodia	0–4	Palestine
	Report	Keshkesh 10'; Al-Sweirki 12', 75'; Attal 30'

Bangabandhu Stadium, Dhaka
Attendance: 2,500
Referee: Ala Abdul Kadir Nema (Iraq)
3 April 2006
18:00

Guam	0–3	Bangladesh
	Report	Ameli 49'; Abul 83', 85'

Bangabandhu Stadium, Dhaka
Attendance: 18,000
Referee: Win Cho (Myanmar)

5 April 2006
15:30

Palestine	1–1	Bangladesh
Attal 30'	Report	Tapu 55'

Bangabandhu Stadium, Dhaka
Attendance: 22,000
Referee: Hedayat Mombini (Iran)
6 April 2006
14:00

Cambodia	3–0	Guam
S. Buntheang 37'; Kosal 40'; K. Kumpheak 63'	Report

Bangladesh Army Stadium, Dhaka
Attendance: 500
Referee: Win Cho (Myanmar)

=== Group D ===
Team	Pld	W	D	L	GF	GA	GD	Pts
Tajikistan	3	2	0	1	6	1	+5	6
Kyrgyzstan	3	2	0	1	3	1	+2	6
Pakistan	3	1	1	1	3	4	−1	4
Macau	3	0	1	2	2	8	−6	1

Source: RSSSF
2 April 2006
15:30

Tajikistan	4–0	Macau
Mahmudov 9'; Rabiev 13'; Rabimov 56'; Khojaev 77'	Report

Bangabandhu Stadium, Dhaka
Attendance: 2,000
Referee: Hedayat Mombini (Iran)
2 April 2006
18:00

Kyrgyzstan	0–1	Pakistan
	Report	Essa 59'

Bangabandhu Stadium, Dhaka
Attendance: 2,500
Referee: Tayeb Shamsuzzaman (Bangladesh)

4 April 2006
15:30

Pakistan	0–2	Tajikistan
	Report	Hakimov 14'; Irgashev 20'

Bangabandhu Stadium, Dhaka
Attendance: 5,000
Referee: Tan Hai (China PR)

6 April 2006
14:00

Tajikistan	0–1	Kyrgyzstan
	Report	Krasnov 22'

Bangabandhu Stadium, Dhaka
Attendance: 2,000
Referee: Ala Abdul Kadir Nema (Iraq)
6 April 2006
16:00

Pakistan	2–2	Macau
Adeel 12'; Essa 43'	Report	Chan Kin Seng 16', 52'

Bangabandhu Stadium, Dhaka
Attendance: 1,000
Referee: Tayeb Shamsuzzaman (Bangladesh)

7 April 2006
14:00

Macau	0–2	Kyrgyzstan
	Report	Ablakimov 35'; Ishenbaev 58'

Bangabandhu Stadium, Dhaka
Attendance: 1,000
Referee: Tan Hai (China PR)

== Knockout stage ==
Quarter-finals
8 April – Chittagong
Chinese Taipei	0
Sri Lanka	3
9 April – Chittagong
India U20	0
Nepal	3
9 April – Dhaka
Palestine	0
Kyrgyzstan	1
10 April – Dhaka
Bangladesh	1
Tajikistan	6

Semi-finals
12 April – Chittagong
Sri Lanka (p)	1 (5)
Nepal	1 (3)
13 April – Dhaka
Kyrgyzstan	0
Tajikistan	2

Final
16 April – Dhaka
Sri Lanka	0
Tajikistan	4

=== Quarter-finals ===
8 April 2006
15:30

Sri Lanka	3–0	Chinese Taipei
Izzadeen 44'; Sanjaya 70'; Ratnayaka 90'	Report

MA Aziz Stadium, Chittagong
Attendance: 2,500
Referee: Mahmood Al-Ghatrifi (Oman)

9 April 2006
15:30

India U20	0–3	Nepal
	Report	Pradeep 16', 26'; Basanta 28'

MA Aziz Stadium, Chittagong
Attendance: 3,000
Referee: Ram Krishna Gosh (Bangladesh)

9 April 2006
15:30

Palestine	0–1	Kyrgyzstan
	Report	Djamshidov 90+1'

Bangabandhu Stadium, Dhaka
Attendance: 150
Referee: Win Cho (Myanmar)

10 April 2006
15:30

Tajikistan	6–1	Bangladesh
Rabimov 2'; Mahmudov 20'; Mukhidinov 31'; Hakimov 51'; Rabiev 65'; Nematov 81'	Report	Alfaz 17'

Bangabandhu Stadium, Dhaka
Attendance: 15,000
Referee: Ala Abdul Kadir Nema (Iraq)

=== Semi-finals ===
12 April 2006
15:30

Sri Lanka	1–1	Nepal
Kasun 65'	Report	Basanta 82'
Penalties
Fuard (penalty scored); Chathura (penalty scored); Gunaratne (penalty scored); Channa (penalty scored); Ratnayaka (penalty scored)	5 – 3	(penalty scored) Anjan; (penalty scored) Tashi; (penalty scored) Nabin; (penalty missed) Pradeep

MA Aziz Stadium, Chittagong
Attendance: 2,500
Referee: Lee Gi-Young (Korea Republic)

13 April 2006
15:30

Kyrgyzstan	0–2	Tajikistan
	Report	Rabiev 51', 90+2'

Bangabandhu Stadium, Dhaka
Attendance: 2,000
Referee: Tan Hai (China PR)

=== Final ===
16 April 2006
15:30

Sri Lanka	0–4	Tajikistan
	Report	Mukhidinov 1', 61', 71' (Note: Although the match summary indicates that Mukhidinov scored three goals, a match review article published by the AFC on 19 April 2006 indicates that he only scored two goals while teammate Numonjon Hakimov scored one goal.); Mahmudov 45'

Bangabandhu Stadium, Dhaka
Attendance: 2,000
Referee: Hedayat Mombini (Iran)

== Winner ==
2006 AFC Challenge Cup champions

Tajikistan
First title

== Awards ==
Fair Play Award	Golden Shoe	Most Valuable Player
Sri Lanka	(Palestine) Fahed Attal	(Tajikistan) Ibrahim Rabimov

== Goalscorers ==
8 goals

- (Palestine) Fahed Attal

5 goals

- (Nepal) Pradeep Maharjan

4 goals

- (Tajikistan) Dzhomikhon Mukhidinov
- (Tajikistan) Yusuf Rabiev

3 goals

- (India) Vimal Pariyar
- (Tajikistan) Khurshed Makhmudov

2 goals

- (Afghanistan) Hafizullah Qadami
- (Bangladesh) Alfaz Ahmed
- (Bangladesh) Zahid Hasan Ameli
- (Bangladesh) Mohamed Abul Hossain
- (Chinese Taipei) Chuang Wei-lun
- (Macau) Chan Kin Seng
- (Nepal) Basanta Thapa
- (Pakistan) Muhammad Essa
- (Palestine) Ziyad Al-Kord
- (Palestine) Ibrahim Al-Sweirki
- (Palestine) Ahmed Keshkesh
- (Philippines) Alvin Valeroso
- (Sri Lanka) Kasun Jayasuriya
- (Sri Lanka) Mohamed Izzadeen
- (Tajikistan) Numonjon Hakimov
- (Tajikistan) Ibrahim Rabimov

1 goal

- (Afghanistan) Sayed Maqsood
- (Bangladesh) Mehedi Hassan Tapu
- (Brunei) Adie Arsham Salleh
- (Brunei) Riwandi Wahit
- (Cambodia) Sok Buntheang
- (Cambodia) Keo Kosal
- (Cambodia) Chan Rithy
- (Cambodia) Kouch Sokumpheak
- (Chinese Taipei) Liang Chien-wei
- (Kyrgyzstan) Roman Ablakimov
- (Kyrgyzstan) Ruslan Djamshidov
- (Kyrgyzstan) Azamat Ishenbaev
- (Kyrgyzstan) Andrey Krasnov
- (Nepal) Tashi Tsering
- (Pakistan) Adeel Ahmed
- (Palestine) Ismail Al-Amour
- (Palestine) Francisco Atura
- (Sri Lanka) Sanjaya Pradeep Arachchige
- (Sri Lanka) Chandradasa Karunaratne
- (Sri Lanka) Jeewantha Dhammika Ratnayaka
- (Tajikistan) Odil Irgashev
- (Tajikistan) Rustam Khojaev
- (Tajikistan) Shujoat Nematov
