= Dzhomikhon Mukhidinov =

Tajikistani footballer (born 1976)

Çomixon Muxiddinov
Personal information
- Date of birth: 15 April 1976 (age 50)
- Position: Forward

Senior career*
Years	Team	Apps	(Gls)
2000–2006	Khujand		
2005	→ Regar-TadAZ (loan)		
2007–2008	Parvoz Bobojon Ghafurov		
2009	Vakhsh Qurghonteppa		
2010	Regar-TadAZ		
2011	Parvoz Bobojon Ghafurov		
2012	Khujand		

International career
2003–2010	Tajikistan	32	(7)
- * Club domestic league appearances and goals

Çomixon Muxiddinov (Tajik: Ҷомихон Муҳиддинов; born on 15 April 1976) is a Tajikistani former professional footballer who played as a forward. He was a member of the Tajikistan national team in the 2010 FIFA World Cup qualification campaign.

== Career statistics ==
Tajikistan
Year	Apps	Goals
2003	5	1
2004	3	0
2005	0	0
2006	6	3
2007	3	1
2008	8	2
2009	1	0
2010	6	0
Total	32	7

Statistics accurate as of match played 26 June 2010

#	Date	Venue	Opponent	Score	Result	Competition
1	21 November 2003	Bangkok, Thailand	Hong Kong	1–0	1–0	2004 AFC Asian Cup qualification
2	10 April 2006	Dhaka, Bangladesh	Bangladesh	3–1	6–1	2006 AFC Challenge Cup
3	16 April 2006	Dhaka, Bangladesh	Sri Lanka	1–0	4–0	2006 AFC Challenge Cup
4	16 April 2006	Dhaka, Bangladesh	Sri Lanka	2–0	4–0	2006 AFC Challenge Cup
5.	28 October 2007	Dushanbe, Tajikistan	Bangladesh	3–0	5–0	2010 FIFA World Cup qualification
6.	17 May 2008	Iloilo City, Philippines	Brunei	2–0	4–0	2008 AFC Challenge Cup qualification
7.	7 August 2008	Hyderabad, India	North Korea	1–0	1–0	2008 AFC Challenge Cup

== Honours ==
Khujand

- Tajik Cup: 2002

Regar-TadAZ

- Tajik Cup: 2005

Parvoz Bobojon Ghafurov

- Tajik Cup: 2007

Vakhsh Qurghonteppa

- Tajik League: 2009
