= Aibek Bokoyev =

Kyrgyzstani footballer

Personal information
- Date of birth: 4 January 1982 (age 44)
- Place of birth: Soviet Union
- Position: Midfielder

Team information
- Current team: Abdish-Ata Kant

Senior career*
Years	Team	Apps	(Gls)
2004–2006	RUOR Guardia Bishkek		
2006–2008	Dordoi-Dynamo Naryn		
2009–2012	Abdish-Ata Kant		

International career
2006–2012	Kyrgyzstan		
- * Club domestic league appearances and goals

Aibek Bokoyev (4 January 1982) is a retired Kyrgyzstani footballer, who was a striker. He played for numerous clubs in his native country, including Abdish-Ata Kant and Dordoi-Dynamo Naryn. He was a member and a captain of the Kyrgyzstan national football team.

== International Career Stats ==
=== Goals for Senior National Team ===
#	Date	Venue	Opponent	Score	Result	Competition
	18 October 2007	Bishkek, Kyrgyzstan	Jordan	2–0	Won	2010 FIFA World Cup qualification
