= Davron Askarov =

Kyrgyz footballer (born 1988)

Personal information
- Full name: Davronbek Uzgenbaevich Askarov
- Date of birth: 6 January 1988 (age 38)
- Height: 1.65 m (5 ft 5 in)
- Position: Left-back

Senior career*
Years	Team	Apps	(Gls)
2004–2006	Zhashtyk-Ak-Altyn Kara-Suu		
2007–2009	Dordoi-Dynamo Naryn		
2009–2010	Toulouse	0	(0)
2010–2015	Dordoi		
2016	Elazığ Belediyespor	11	(0)
2016–2017	Serhat Ardahan Spor	28	(0)

International career^{‡}
2006–2014	Kyrgyzstan	37	(0)
- * Club domestic league appearances and goals as of 21:28, 11 January 2020 (UTC) ‡ National team caps and goals as of 21:28, 11 January 2020 (UTC)

Davronbek Uzgenbaevich Askarov (born 6 January 1988) is a Kyrgyz professional footballer who plays as a left-back.

== Career ==
Askarov has played for Zhashtyk-Ak-Altyn Kara-Suu, Dordoi-Dynamo Naryn and Toulouse. He later played in Turkey for Elazığ Belediyespor (11 appearances) and Serhat Ardahan Spor (28 appearances).

He earned 37 caps for the Kyrgyzstan national team between 2006 and 2014, including 4 appearances in FIFA World Cup qualifying matches.
