= Francisco Atura =

Palestinian footballer

Francisco Alam
Personal information
- Full name: Francisco Armando Alam Iturra
- Date of birth: 1 August 1979 (age 47)
- Place of birth: La Calera, Chile
- Position: Defender

Youth career
- Santiago Wanderers

Senior career*
Years	Team	Apps	(Gls)
1997–2001	Santiago Wanderers		
1999–2001	Santiago Wanderers B		
2002–2004	Unión La Calera		
2005–2006	Unión San Felipe		

International career
2002–2006	Palestine	24	(3)
- * Club domestic league appearances and goals

Francisco Armando Alam Iturra (Note: In some sources, his maternal surname is incorrectly spelled "Atura".) (born 1 August 1979) is a former professional footballer who played at both professional and international levels as a defender.

== Career ==
Alam spent his entire professional career in Chile, playing with Santiago Wanderers, Unión La Calera and Unión San Felipe.

Born in Chile, Alam earned 24 caps for the Palestinian national side between 2002 and 2006, appearing in five FIFA World Cup qualifying matches.
