= Kasun Jayasuriya =

Sri Lankan footballer

Kasun Jayasuriya කසුන් ජයසූරිය
Personal information
- Full name: Kasun Nadika Jayasuriya Weerarathne
- Date of birth: 25 March 1980 (age 46)
- Place of birth: Colombo, Sri Lanka
- Height: 1.75 m (5 ft 9 in)
- Position: Striker

Senior career*
Years	Team	Apps	(Gls)
1998–2001	Pettah United		
2001	Island FC Malé		
2001–2003	Indian Bank	23	(15)
2003–2004	Pettah United		
2004–2006	Dempo SC		
2006–2017	Ratnam SC		
2017–2020	Saunders SC		

International career
1999–2009	Sri Lanka	60	(28)
- * Club domestic league appearances and goals

Kasun Nadika Jayasuriya (born 25 March 1980) is a retired Sri Lankan football forward who last played for Saunders Sports Club and the Sri Lanka national football team. He is the all-time top goalscorer for the Sri Lankan national team.

== Club career ==
Jayasuriya became the top-scorer of Sri Lanka's Kit Premier League, having scored 21 goals. He previously played at the National Football League for two Indian club; Indian Bank RC, and Dempo SC.

== International career ==
Jayasuriya represented Sri Lanka internationally and is the all time goal scorer for Sri Lanka in international football history with 28 goals.

== Career statistics ==
=== International goals ===
Scores and results list the Sri Lanka's goal tally first.

No.	Date	Venue	Opponent	Score	Result	Competition
1.	1 May 2000	Rasmee Dhandu Stadium, Malé, Maldives	Maldives	1–1	1–1	2000 MFF Golden Jubilee Tournament
2.	25 August 2000	Ho Chi Minh City, Vietnam	Vietnam	2–1	2–2	2000 HCM Cup
3.	28 March 2001	Colombo, Sri Lanka	Cambodia	1–0	1–0	Friendly
4.	17 May 2001	Beirut Municipal Stadium, Beirut, Lebanon	Pakistan	3–2	3–3	2002 FIFA World Cup qualification (AFC)
5.	30 May 2001	Suphachalasai Stadium, Bangkok, Thailand	Pakistan	1–0	3–1	2002 FIFA World Cup qualification (AFC)
6.	30 May 2001	Suphachalasai Stadium, Bangkok, Thailand	Pakistan	3–0	3–1	2002 FIFA World Cup qualification (AFC)
7.	17 March 2002	Sugathadasa Stadium, Colombo, Sri Lanka	Pakistan	1–1	1–1	Friendly
8.	4 April 2002	Sugathadasa Stadium, Colombo, Sri Lanka	Maldives	1–0	1–0	Friendly
9.	21 March 2003	Sugathadasa Stadium, Colombo, Sri Lanka	Timor-Leste	1–1	3–2	2004 AFC Asian Cup qualification
10.	21 March 2003	Sugathadasa Stadium, Colombo, Sri Lanka	Timor-Leste	3–2	3–2	2004 AFC Asian Cup qualification
11.	3 December 2003	Sugathadasa Stadium, Colombo, Sri Lanka	Laos	2–0	3–0	2006 FIFA World Cup qualification (AFC)
12.	2 April 2006	MA Aziz Stadium, Chittagong, Bangladesh	Brunei	2–0	3–0	2006 AFC Challenge Cup
13.	12 April 2006	MA Aziz Stadium, Chittagong, Bangladesh	Nepal	1–0	1–1	2006 AFC Challenge Cup
14.	24 March 2007	Sugathadasa Stadium, Colombo, Sri Lanka	Malaysia	1–4	1–4	Friendly
15.	2 April 2008	Chungshan Stadium, Taipei, Taiwan	Guam	5–1	5–1	2008 AFC Challenge Cup qualification
16.	4 April 2008	Chungshan Stadium, Taipei, Taiwan	Pakistan	1–0	7–1	2008 AFC Challenge Cup qualification
17.	4 April 2008	Chungshan Stadium, Taipei, Taiwan	Pakistan	4–1	7–1	2008 AFC Challenge Cup qualification
18.	4 April 2008	Chungshan Stadium, Taipei, Taiwan	Pakistan	7–1	7–1	2008 AFC Challenge Cup qualification
19.	6 April 2008	Chungshan Stadium, Taipei, Taiwan	Chinese Taipei	2–2	2–2	2008 AFC Challenge Cup qualification
20.	2 August 2008	Gachibowli Athletic Stadium, Hyderabad, India	Myanmar	1–1	1–3	2008 AFC Challenge Cup
21.	4 April 2009	Sugathadasa Stadium, Colombo, Sri Lanka	Brunei	1–0	5–1	2010 AFC Challenge Cup qualification
22.	4 April 2009	Sugathadasa Stadium, Colombo, Sri Lanka	Brunei	3–0	5–1	2010 AFC Challenge Cup qualification
23.	4 April 2009	Sugathadasa Stadium, Colombo, Sri Lanka	Brunei	4–0	5–1	2010 AFC Challenge Cup qualification
24.	4 April 2009	Sugathadasa Stadium, Colombo, Sri Lanka	Brunei	5–0	5–1	2010 AFC Challenge Cup qualification
25.	6 April 2009	Sugathadasa Stadium, Colombo, Sri Lanka	Chinese Taipei	1–0	2–1	2010 AFC Challenge Cup qualification
26.	6 December 2009	Bangabandhu National Stadium, Dhaka, Bangladesh	Bhutan	3–0	6–0	2009 SAFF Championship
27.	6 December 2009	Bangabandhu National Stadium, Dhaka, Bangladesh	Bhutan	4–0	6–0	2009 SAFF Championship
28.	6 December 2009	Bangabandhu National Stadium, Dhaka, Bangladesh	Bhutan	5–0	6–0	2009 SAFF Championship

== Honours ==
Sri Lanka

- AFC Challenge Cup: 2006
- ANFA Cup runner-up: 2009
