= Fahed Attal =

Palestinian professional football player

Personal information
- Full name: Fahed Adnan Foad Abdul Attal
- Date of birth: 1 January 1985 (age 41)
- Place of birth: Qalqilya, West Bank
- Height: 1.80 m (5 ft 11 in)
- Position: Striker

Youth career
- Islami Qalqilya

Senior career*
Years	Team	Apps	(Gls)
2003–2007	Islami Qalqilya		
2006–2007	→ Al-Jazeera (loan)		(8)
2007–2010	Al-Jazeera		(18)
2010–2011	Al-Wahdat	13	(5)
2011–2018	Shabab Al-Khaleel		

International career
2005–2012	Palestine	39	(14)
- * Club domestic league appearances and goals

Fahed Adnan Foad Abdul Attal (Arabic: فهد عتال; born 1 January 1985) is a Palestinian former professional footballer who played as a striker.

== Club career ==
=== Move to Jordanian Premier League ===
After grabbing the attention of scouts of clubs such as Al-Wahdat with a dazzling performance at the 2006 AFC Challenge Cup Attal agreed a loan deal with Al-Jazeera of the Jordan League. After scoring 8 goals in his inaugural season, Attal was transferred on a permanent deal worth $21000 USD. In 2010, he signed a one-year $50,000 contract to join Al-Wahdat With the signing of Abdullah Deeb, Attal chose to search for a new club. He signed a one-year contract with Hebron-based Shabab Al-Khaleel of the West Bank Premier League.

== International career ==
Attal was the all-time top goalscorer of the Palestine national team, with 14 goals in 39 games until 2024. Twelve of Attal's goals with the national team came in the 2006 calendar year earning him recognition from International Federation of Football History and Statistics which cited Attal as the World's 8th leading scorer of international goals on par with the likes of David Villa and Bastian Schweinsteiger. Attal was also included in the Asian Football Confederation shortlist of 10 players for the 2006 AFC Player of the Year Award.

== Career statistics ==
=== International ===
Scores and results list Palestine's goal tally first.

#	Date	Venue	Opponent	Score	Result	Competition
1.	16 February 2006	Bahrain National Stadium, Manama	Bahrain	2–0	2–0	Friendly
2.	18 February 2006	Bahrain National Stadium, Manama	Pakistan	1–0	1–0	Friendly
3.	18 February 2006	Bahrain National Stadium, Manama	Pakistan	2–0	1–0	Friendly
4.	1 March 2006	King Abdullah Stadium, Amman	Singapore	1–0	1–0	2007 AFC Asian Cup qualifier
5.	1 April 2006	Bangabandhu Stadium, Dhaka	Guam	2–0	11–0	2006 AFC Challenge Cup
6.	1 April 2006	Bangabandhu Stadium, Dhaka	Guam	3–0	11–0	2006 AFC Challenge Cup
7.	1 April 2006	Bangabandhu Stadium, Dhaka	Guam	5–0	11–0	2006 AFC Challenge Cup
8.	1 April 2006	Bangabandhu Stadium, Dhaka	Guam	6–0	11–0	2006 AFC Challenge Cup
9.	1 April 2006	Bangabandhu Stadium, Dhaka	Guam	8–0	11–0	2006 AFC Challenge Cup
10.	1 April 2006	Bangabandhu Stadium, Dhaka	Guam	11–0	11–0	2006 AFC Challenge Cup
11.	3 April 2006	Bangabandhu Stadium, Dhaka	Cambodia	3–0	4–0	2006 AFC Challenge Cup
12.	5 April 2006	Bangabandhu Stadium, Dhaka	Bangladesh	1–0	1–1	2006 AFC Challenge Cup
13.	8 March 2012	Dasarath Rangasala Stadium, Kathmandu	Nepal	2–0	2–0	2012 AFC Challenge Cup
14.	19 March 2012	Dasarath Rangasala Stadium, Kathmandu	Philippines	3–4	3–4	2012 AFC Challenge Cup
15.	14 May 2012	Faisal Al-Husseini Stadium, Al-Ram	Vietnam	2–0	2–0*	2012 Al Nakba Cup
16.	22 May 2012	Hussein Bin Ali Stadium, Hebron	Indonesia	2–1	2–1*	2012 Al Nakba Cup

- Unofficial

== Honours ==
Al-Wehdat

- Jordan League: 2010–11
- Jordan FA Cup: 2010–11
- Jordan FA Shield: 2010
- Jordan Super Cup: 2011

Individual

- AFC Challenge Cup Golden Boot: 2006
