= Chetan Ghimire =

Nepalese footballer

Personal information
- Full name: Chetan Ghimire
- Date of birth: 3 February 1988 (age 38)
- Place of birth: Janakpurdham, Nepal
- Height: 5 ft 7 in (1.70 m)
- Position: Striker

Team information
- Current team: APF F.C. (women) (head coach)

Senior career*
Years	Team	Apps	(Gls)
2007–2014	Nepal Police Club		

International career
2009–2013	Nepal	8	(0)
- Nepal B
- * Club domestic league appearances and goals

Chetan Ghimire (Nepali: चेतन घिमिरे; born 3 February 1988) is a Nepali former professional footballer who played as a striker for Nepal Police Club and the Nepal national team.

== Club career ==
Chetan Ghimire joined Nepal Police Club in 2007 and spent entire career playing for them. However, in early 2013 he tore ACL for the second time in a match against Nepal Army Club. He retired after in 2014.

== International career ==
Having previously played for Nepal B, Ghimire made his debut for the senior team on 26 March 2009 during a 0–0 draw against Palestine during the 2010 AFC Challenge Cup qualification. He would then feature for all three group stage matches of the 2009 SAFF Championship as Nepal finished third in group A and failed to qualify for the semi-finals. Ghimire played his final international match on 2 March 2013, in a 6–0 win against Northern Mariana Islands during the 2014 AFC Challenge Cup qualification.
