= 2005 AFC President's Cup =

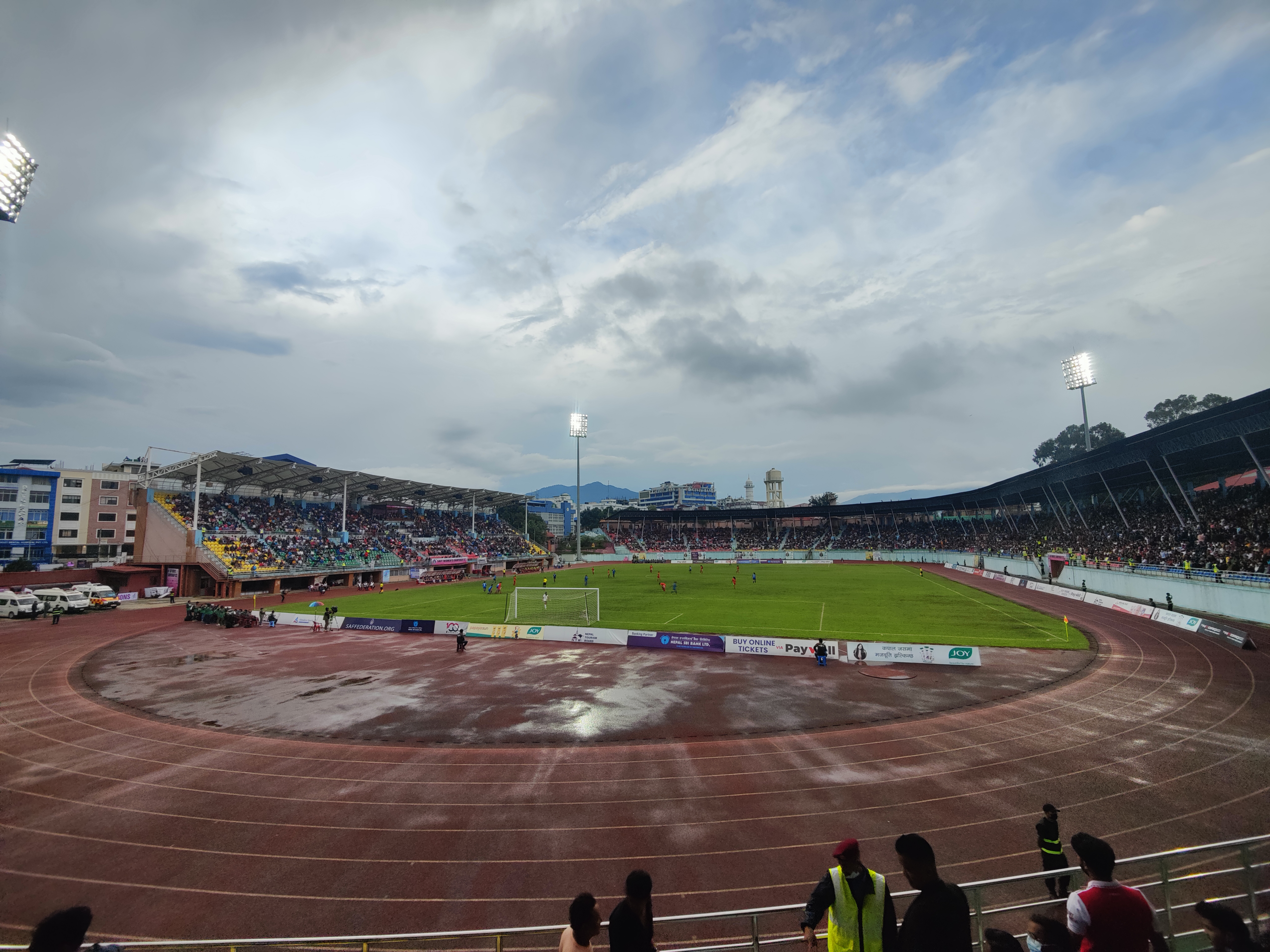
- Dasharath Rangasala Stadium in Kathmandu hosted the final

Tournament details
- Host country: Nepal
- Dates: 4–14 May
- Teams: 8 (from 8 associations)
- Venues: 2 (in 1 host city)

Final positions
- Champions: (Tajikistan) Regar-TadAZ (1st title)
- Runners-up: (Kyrgyzstan) Dordoi-Dynamo

Tournament statistics
- Matches played: 15
- Goals scored: 51 (3.4 per match)
- Top scorer(s): (Cambodia) Hok Sochetra (Sri Lanka) Dudley Steinwall (Tajikistan) Khurshed Mahmudov (Tajikistan) Dzhomikhon Mukhidinov (4 goals each)

The 2005 AFC President's Cup was the inaugural season of the AFC President's Cup, a competition for football clubs in countries categorized as "emerging nations" by the Asian Football Confederation. The eight teams that competed were split into two groups and played each other team in their group once. The winner of each group then played the runner-up in the other group in the semifinals, and the winners of the semifinal matches played in the final match to determine the winner. There was no third-place match. The games were played in May 2005 and were held in Kathmandu, Nepal.

== Qualified teams ==
Association	Team	Qualifying method
Bhutan	Transport United	2004 A-Division champions
Cambodia	Hello United	most likely as 2002 Cambodian League champions
Chinese Taipei	Taipower	2004 Chinese Taipei National Football League champions
Kyrgyzstan	Dordoi-Dynamo	2004 Kyrgyzstan League champions
Nepal	Three Star Club	2004 Martyr's Memorial A-Division League champions
Pakistan	WAPDA	2004-05 Pakistan Premier League champions
Sri Lanka	Blue Star SC	2003–04 Sri Lanka Football Premier League champions
Tajikistan	Regar-TadAZ	2004 Tajik League champions

Notes

1. Note: No Cambodian League was held between 2003 and 2004 due to unknown reasons

== Venues ==
Kathmandu
Dasarath Rangasala Stadium	Halchowk Stadium
Capacity: 17,800	Capacity: 3,500
2005 AFC President's Cup is located in Nepal

== Group stage ==
=== Group A ===
Pos	Team	Pld	W	D	L	GF	GA	GD	Pts	Qualification
1	(Tajikistan) Regar-TadAZ	3	2	1	0	9	1	+8	7	Advance to semi-finals
2	(Nepal) Three Star Club (H)	3	1	2	0	3	2	+1	5	Advance to semi-finals
3	(Chinese Taipei) Taipower	3	1	1	1	2	4	−2	4	
4	(Bhutan) Transport United	3	0	0	3	2	9	−7	0	

Source: AFC
Rules for classification: Tie-breaking criteria
(H) Hosts
4 May 2005
16:00

Three Star Club (Nepal)	1–1	(Chinese Taipei) Taipower
Maharjan 38'	Report	Chen Chi-Feng 36'

Dasarath Stadium, Kathmandu
Attendance: 15,000
Referee: (Kyrgyzstan) Chaiwat Kunsuta
4 May 2005
16:00

Regar-TadAZ (Tajikistan)	6–1	(Bhutan) Transport United
Mahmudov 18', 89'; Mukhidinov 35', 37', 56'; Tabarov 86'	Report	Dendup 68'

Halchowk Stadium, Kathmandu
Attendance: 2,000
Referee: (Thailand) Anura De Silva Vidanagamage
6 May 2005
16:00

Taipower (Chinese Taipei)	0–3	(Tajikistan) Regar-TadAZ
	Report	Irgashev 7'; Mukhidinov 18'; Tabarov 40'

Halchowk Stadium, Kathmandu
Attendance: 2,000
Referee: (Sri Lanka) Setiyono Midi Nitrorejo
6 May 2005
16:00

Transport United (Bhutan)	1–2	(Nepal) Three Star Club
Chophel 37'	Report	Gouchan 10'; Maharjan 43'

Dasarath Stadium, Kathmandu
Attendance: 8,000
Referee: (Kyrgyzstan) Emil Busurmankulov
8 May 2005
16:00

Taipower (Chinese Taipei)	1–0	(Bhutan) Transport United
Chiang Shih-lu 40'	Report

Halchowk Stadium, Kathmandu
Attendance: 600
Referee: (Kyrgyzstan) Emil Busurmankulov
8 May 2005
16:00

Three Star Club (Nepal)	0–0	(Tajikistan) Regar-TadAZ
	Report

Dasarath Stadium, Kathmandu
Attendance: 12,000
Referee: (Sri Lanka) Anura De Silva Vidanagamage

=== Group B ===
Pos	Team	Pld	W	D	L	GF	GA	GD	Pts	Qualification
1	(Kyrgyzstan) Dordoi-Dynamo	3	2	0	1	14	3	+11	6	Advance to semi-finals
2	(Sri Lanka) Blue Star SC	3	2	0	1	5	10	−5	6	Advance to semi-finals
3	(Pakistan) WAPDA	3	1	0	2	2	3	−1	3	
4	(Cambodia) Hello United	3	1	0	2	5	10	−5	3	

Source: AFC
Rules for classification: Tie-breaking criteria
5 May 2005
16:00

Dordoi-Dynamo (Kyrgyzstan)	6 – 1	(Cambodia) Hello United
Kasymov 24', 43'; Krasnov 25', 39'; Chikishev 28'; Berezovsky 71'	Report	Sochetra 40'

Halchowk Stadium, Kathmandu
Attendance: 1,000
Referee: (Bangladesh) Tayeb Hasan Shamsuzzaman
5 May 2005
16:00

WAPDA (Pakistan)	0 – 1	(Sri Lanka) Blue Star SC
	Report	Steinwall 26'

Dasarath Stadium, Kathmandu
Attendance: 400
Referee: (Vietnam) Vu Duc Nguyen
7 May 2005
16:00

Hello United (Cambodia)	2 – 1	(Pakistan) WAPDA
Sochetra 48', 90+2'	Report	Mehmood 16'

Halchowk Stadium, Kathmandu
Attendance: 1,000
Referee: (Thailand) Chaiwat Kunsuta
7 May 2005
16:00

Blue Star SC (Sri Lanka)	1 – 8	(Kyrgyzstan) Dordoi-Dynamo
Steinwall 19'	Report	Kasymov 1'; Krohmal 11'; Krasnov 15'; Berezovsky 16'; Jumagulov 42'; Chertkov 64'; Ishenbaev 76', 81'

Dasarath Stadium, Kathmandu
Attendance: 2,000
Referee: (Bangladesh) Tayeb Hasan Shamsuzzaman
9 May 2005
16:00

Hello United (Cambodia)	2 – 3	(Sri Lanka) Blue Star SC
Sokunthea 60'; Sochetra 79' (pen.)	Report	Steinwall 32' (pen.), 72'; Fawzan 90'

Dasarath Stadium, Kathmandu
Attendance: 800
Referee: (Indonesia) Setiyono Midi Nitrorejo
9 May 2005
16:00

Dordoi-Dynamo (Kyrgyzstan)	0 – 1	(Pakistan) WAPDA
	Report	Mehmood 81'

Halchowk Stadium, Kathmandu
Attendance: 500
Referee: (India) Manuel Pereira

== Semi-finals ==
12 May 2005
16:00

Regar-TadAZ (Tajikistan)	6 – 0	(Sri Lanka) Blue Star SC
Khamidov 13', 43'; Mahmudov 41'; Umarbaev 70'; Rustamov 74'; Nematov 90'	Report

Dashrath Stadium, Kathmandu
Attendance: 10,000
Referee: Manuel Pereira (India)
12 May 2005
19:00

Dordoi-Dynamo (Kyrgyzstan)	0 – 0 (a.e.t.)	(Nepal) Three Star Club
	Report
Penalties
	4 – 3	Pradeep Maharjan (penalty scored); Pralay Rajbhandari (penalty scored); Vishan Gauchan (penalty scored)

Dashrath Stadium, Kathmandu
Attendance: 22,000
Referee: Tayeb Hasan Shamsuzzaman (Bangladesh)

== Final ==
14 May 2005
19:00

Regar-TadAZ (Tajikistan)	3 – 0	(Kyrgyzstan) Dordoi-Dynamo
Rakhimov 7'; Irgashev 70' (pen.); Mahmudov 72'	Report

Dashrath Stadium, Kathmandu
Attendance: 8,000
Referee: Chaiwat Kunsuta (Thailand)
