= Azamat Ishenbayev =

Kyrgyzstani footballer

Personal information
- Full name: Azamat Ishenbayev
- Date of birth: 19 June 1978 (age 48)
- Place of birth: Soviet Union
- Height: 1.80 m (5 ft 11 in)
- Position: Midfielder

Senior career*
Years	Team	Apps	(Gls)
1997–2000	Dinamo Bishkek	75	(38)
2001–2007	Dordoi-Dynamo Naryn	95+	(94)

International career^{‡}
2000–2007	Kyrgyzstan	18	(2)
- * Club domestic league appearances and goals as of 30 October 2015 ‡ National team caps and goals as of 30 October 2015

Azamat Ishenbayev (born 19 June 1978) is a Kyrgyzstani former footballer who played for Dordoi-Dynamo Naryn. He was a member of the Kyrgyzstan national football team.

== International goals ==
#	Date	Venue	Opponent	Score	Result	Competition
1	31 March 2004	Spartak Stadium, Bishkek, Kyrgyzstan	Syria	1-1	Draw	2006 FIFA World Cup qualification
2	7 April 2006	Bangabandhu Stadium, Dhaka, Bangladesh	Macau	2–0	Win	2006 AFC Challenge Cup

Azamat's brothers, Kanat and Maksat, also played football.
