= Cambodia national football team results (1983–2009) =

This article provides details of international football games played by the Cambodia national football team from the 1980 to 2009.

== 1981 ==
? April Friendly	People’s Republic of Kampuchea	0-2	Laos	Phnom Penh, People's Republic of Kampuchea
		Report		Stadium: Olympic Stadium

? April Friendly	People’s Republic of Kampuchea	0-2	Laos	Phnom Penh, People's Republic of Kampuchea
		Report		Stadium: Olympic Stadium

? April Friendly	People’s Republic of Kampuchea	0-2	Laos	Phnom Penh, People's Republic of Kampuchea
		Report		Stadium: Olympic Stadium

? April Friendly	People’s Republic of Kampuchea	1-1	Laos	Phnom Penh, People's Republic of Kampuchea
		Report		Stadium: Olympic Stadium

== 1982 ==
? December Hybrid Friendly	Phnom Penh City; Selection	1-2	(Soviet Union) Dynamo Kirov	Phnom Penh, People's Republic of Kampuchea
		Report		Stadium: Olympic Stadium

? December Hybrid Friendly	People’s Republic of Kampuchea	1-5	(Soviet Union) Dynamo Kirov	Phnom Penh, People's Republic of Kampuchea
		Report		Stadium: Olympic Stadium

== 1983 ==
Unknown Hybrid Friendly	(Ukrainian Soviet Socialist Republic) Bukovyna Chernivtsi	11-0	People's; Republic of Kampuchea	Chernivtsi, Ukrainian SSR
		Report		Stadium: Bukovyna Stadium

13 September Friendly	Vietnam	0-0	People’s Republic of Kampuchea	Hanoi, Vietnam
		Report		Attendance: 30,000

24 September Friendly	Ho Chi Minh City XI (Vietnam)	4-0	People’s Republic of Kampuchea	Ho Chi Minh City, Vietnam
		Report		Stadium: Thống Nhất Stadium

== 1984 ==
Unknown Hybrid Friendly	People's Republic of Kampuchea	1-3	(Georgian Soviet Socialist Republic) Locomotive Samtredia	Phnom Penh, People's Republic of Kampuchea
		Report		Stadium: Olympic Stadium; Attendance: 70,000

9 July Hybrid Friendly	(Ukrainian Soviet Socialist Republic) Nyva Vinnytsia	Unknown	People's; Republic of Kampuchea	Vinnytsia, Ukrainian SSR
19:00		Report		Stadium: Central City Stadium

? July Hybrid Friendly	People's Republic of Kampuchea	Unknown	(Ukrainian Soviet Socialist Republic) Ukrainian State Selection	Kiev, Ukrainian SSR
		Report

26 July Friendly	Vietnam	4-1	People’s Republic of Kampuchea	Hanoi, Vietnam
				Attendance: 25,000

? November Hybrid Friendly	Cambodian League Selection	1-7	(Czechoslovakia) AŠ Mladá Boleslav	Phnom Penh, People's Republic of Kampuchea
				Stadium: Olympic Stadium

28 November Hybrid Friendly	(Vietnam) Đồng Nai	2-0	Cambodia Army	Biên Hòa, Vietnam
				Stadium: Biên Hòa Stadium

7 December 1984 SKDA	Cambodia Army	1-3	Cuba Army	Khánh Hòa, Vietnam
		Report		Stadium: Nha Trang Stadium

9 December 1984 SKDA	Vietnam II Army	8-1	Cambodia Army	Khánh Hòa, Vietnam
		Report		Stadium: Nha Trang Stadium

== 1985 ==
In 1985, a Soviet club called FC Kuban Krasnodar toured Kampuchea to play three matches. Instead of playing the national team, they played local club teams, with the results listed below:
- Match 1: Ministry of Commerce of Kampuchea 1-4 FC Kuban Krasnodar
- Match 2: Ministry of Health of Kampuchea 2-6 FC Kuban Krasnodar
- Match 3: Ministry of Defense of Kampuchea 2-6 FC Kuban Krasnodar

- All matches will be held in Phnom Penh, Kampuchea.
- Report: https://www.calameo.com/read/0045997947f11d47c54d8

== 1986 ==
Unknown Hybrid Friendly	Cambodia Army	0-1	(Uzbek Soviet Socialist Republic) Neftchi Fergana	Phnom Penh, People's Republic of Kampuchea
		Report		Stadium: Olympic Stadium

== 1989 ==
5 December 1989 SKDA	Hungary Army	5-0	Cambodia Army	Hà Bắc, Vietnam
		Report		Stadium: Hà Bắc Stadium

7 December 1989 SKDA	Vietnam B Army	3-1	Cambodia Army	Thanh Hóa, Vietnam
		Report		Stadium: Thanh Hóa Stadium

12 December 1989 SKDA	Hungary Army	7-0	Cambodia Army	Nam Định, Vietnam
		Report		Stadium: Thiên Trường Stadium

14 December 1989 SKDA	Vietnam B Army	5-0	Cambodia Army	Buôn Mê Thuột, Vietnam
		Report		Stadium: Sân vận động Buôn Ma Thuột Stadium

24 December Indochina Four Nations Tournament	Thailand	Cancelled	Cambodia	Bangkok, Thailand
		Report
Note: Cambodia and Vietnam withdrew from the tournament

26 December Indochina Four Nations Tournament	Cambodia	Cancelled	Vietnam	Bangkok, Thailand
		Report
Note: Cambodia and Vietnam withdrew from the tournament

27 December Indochina Four Nations Tournament	Laos	Cancelled	Cambodia	Bangkok, Thailand
		Report
Note: Cambodia and Vietnam withdrew from the tournament

== 1992 ==
4 February Hybrid Friendly	State of Cambodia	3-4	(South Korea) South Korean Semi-Pro Selection	Phnom Penh, Cambodia
		Report		Stadium: Olympic Stadium

== 1993 ==
9 November Hybrid Friendly	Cambodia	1–2	Russia U-19	Phnom Penh, Cambodia
		Report		Stadium: Olympic Stadium

12 December Friendly	Thailand	8–0	Cambodia	Bangkok, Thailand
		Report

== 1995 ==
23 July Hybrid Friendly	Cambodia	1-4	(China) Shenzhen	Phnom Penh, Cambodia
		Report		Stadium: Olympic Stadium

6 December 1995 SEA Games	Indonesia	10–0	Cambodia	Chiang Mai, Thailand
	Irianto (?) (?) (?) (?); Kurniawan (?) (?) (?); Widodo Putro (?); Lubis (?); Nugroho (?)

8 December 1995 SEA Games	Vietnam	4–0	Cambodia	Chiang Mai, Thailand
	Nguyễn Hồng Sơn 20', 55'; Nguyễn Hữu Đang 47'; Huỳnh Quốc Cường 82'

10 December 1995 SEA Games	Malaysia	9–0	Cambodia	Chiang Mai, Thailand
	Anuar 6', 22', 70'; Dollah 17', 62' (pen.), 67'; Zainal 44'; Affendi 60'; Seng Kong 80'	Report		Referee: Tamat Haji Budin (Brunei)

12 December 1995 SEA Games	Thailand	9–0	Cambodia	Chiang Mai, Thailand
	Vitoon (?) (?) (?); Kiatisuk (?) (?); Cherdchai (?) (?); Netipong (?); Chukiat (?)

== 1996 ==
8 June Friendly	Cambodia	Unknown	Philippines	Phnom Penh, Cambodia
		Report		Stadium: Olympic Stadium

2 September 1996 AFF Championship	Vietnam	3–1	Cambodia	Jurong, Singapore
	Trần Công Minh 21'; Lê Huỳnh Đức 30'; Võ Hoàng Bửu 80' (pen.)	Report	Sony 67'	Stadium: Jurong Stadium; Attendance: 2,800

5 September 1996 AFF Championship	Myanmar	5–0	Cambodia	Jurong, Singapore
	Tin Myo Aung 14'; Win Aung 35', 54'; Myo Hlaing Win 71'; Maung Maung Oo 90'	Report		Stadium: Jurong Stadium; Attendance: 1,500

7 September 1996 AFF Championship	Indonesia	3–0	Cambodia	Jurong, Singapore
	Kurniawan 15'; Sandria 23'; Irianto 60'	Report		Stadium: Jurong Stadium; Attendance: 2,000

9 September 1996 AFF Championship	Cambodia	0–1	Laos	Jurong, Singapore
		Report	Channiphone 39'	Stadium: Jurong Stadium; Attendance: 4,000

== 1997 ==
16 February 1997 President's Cup	Cambodia	4–2	(Philippines) Negros regional XI	Bacolod, Philippines
	Sochetra (?) (?) (?) ?	Report	Rojas (?); Estanda (?)	Stadium: Paglaum Stadium

18 February 1997 President's Cup	Royal Thai Air Force (Thailand)	2–2	Cambodia	Bacolod, Philippines
		Report		Stadium: Paglaum Stadium

19 February 1997 President's Cup	Cambodia	5–0	(Brazil) Atletas de Cristo	Bacolod, Philippines
		Report		Stadium: Paglaum Stadium

23 February 1997 President's Cup Third-place	Philippines	1–1 (3–4 p)	Cambodia	Iloilo City, Philippines
	Del Rosario 36'	Report	Kiri 6'	Stadium: Iloilo Sports Complex

6 April 1998 FIFA World Cup qualification	Indonesia	8–0	Cambodia	Jakarta, Indonesia
	Putro 1'; Lubis 6', 52'; Putiray 12', 44', 70'; Wabia 31', 36'	Report		Stadium: Senayan Stadium; Attendance: 25,000; Referee: Shamsul Maidin (Singapore)

20 April 1998 FIFA World Cup qualification	Cambodia	0–1	Yemen	Phnom Penh, Cambodia
		Report	Dariban 39'	Stadium: Olympic Stadium; Attendance: 20,000; Referee: Ng Yim Kin (Hong Kong)

27 April 1998 FIFA World Cup qualification	Cambodia	1–1	Indonesia	Phnom Penh, Cambodia
	Sochetra 65'	Report	Putro 80'	Stadium: Olympic Stadium; Attendance: 30,000; Referee: Li Haiseng (China)

16 May 1998 FIFA World Cup qualification	Yemen	7–0	Cambodia	Sana'a, Yemen
	Al Ariki 4', 13', 15', 83'; Noman 50'; Bashafal 55'; Abdulla 65'	Report		Stadium: Althawra Sports City Stadium; Attendance: 40,000; Referee: Khaled Dalu (Syria)

25 May 1998 FIFA World Cup qualification	Uzbekistan	6–0	Cambodia	Tashkent, Uzbekistan
	Shirshov 8'; Khasanov 18'; Lebedev 38', 73'; Fedorov 45'; Irismetov 55'	Report		Stadium: Pakhtakor Markaziy Stadium; Attendance: 53,000; Referee: Viktor Kolpakov (Kyrgyzstan)

29 June 1998 FIFA World Cup qualification	Cambodia	1–4	Uzbekistan	Phnom Penh, Cambodia
	Sochetra 12'	Report	Abdukahhor Marifaliev 2', 60'; Ravshan Bozorov 9', 30'	Stadium: Olympic Stadium; Attendance: 12,000; Referee: Abdul Shakoor Baloch (Pakistan)

5 October 1997 SEA Games	Brunei	0–4	Cambodia	Jakarta, Indonesia
18:15 UTC+7		Report	Sochetra (?) (?); Samchay (?); Sovannarith (?)	Stadium: Lebak Bulus Stadium; Referee: Nguyễn Tuấn Hùng (Vietnam)

9 October 1997 SEA Games	Singapore	2–1	Cambodia	Jakarta, Indonesia
16:00 UTC+7	Nasir (?) (?)		Sochetra (?)	Stadium: Lebak Bulus Stadium

12 October 1997 SEA Games	Thailand	4–0	Cambodia	Jakarta, Indonesia
18:15 UTC+7	Senamuang 2', 31'; Piyapong 12'; Natipong 59'	Report		Stadium: Lebak Bulus Stadium

14 October 1997 SEA Games	Myanmar	1–3	Cambodia	Jakarta, Indonesia
16:00 UTC+7	Win Aung (?)		Vuthy (?); Sochetra (?) (?)	Stadium: Lebak Bulus Stadium

== 1998 ==
26 March 1998 AFF Championship qualification	Cambodia	1–1	Philippines	Singapore
	? 28'	Report	Fegidero 86'	Stadium: Jurong Stadium

28 March 1998 AFF Championship qualification	Singapore	3–0	Cambodia	Singapore
				Stadium: Jurong Stadium

2 December 1998 Asian Games	Cambodia	1–4	China	Surat Thani, Thailand
15:30 UTC+7	Hok Sochetra 81'		Yang Chen 17', 77', 82'; Wang Peng 21'	Stadium: Surat Thani Stadium

4 December 1998 Asian Games	Lebanon	5–1	Cambodia	Surat Thani, Thailand
15:30 UTC+7	Taha 34', 80'; Chahrour 36'; Al-Indari 45'; Hojeij 55'		Nuth Sony 70'	Stadium: Surat Thani Stadium

== 1999 ==
31 July 1999 SEA Games	Indonesia	1–0	Cambodia	Bandar Seri Begawan, Brunei
16:00 UTC+8	Mardiansyah 90'	Report		Stadium: Berakas Track and Field Complex; Attendance: 2,000; Referee: Nguyễn Văn Mùi (Vietnam)

2 August 1999 SEA Games	Brunei	3–3	Cambodia	Bandar Seri Begawan, Brunei
16:00 UTC+8	Said Abdullah 22', 41'; Damit 67'	Report	Sophanarith 52'; Sochetra 78', 81'	Stadium: Berakas Track and Field Complex; Attendance: 5,000; Referee: Nguyễn Văn Mùi (Vietnam)

4 August 1999 SEA Games	Cambodia	2–7	Malaysia	Bandar Seri Begawan, Brunei
16:00 UTC+8	Sochetra 17'; Arunreath 36'	Report	Azhar Sofian 8', 46', 89'; Ismail 22', 71'; Suparman 66', 81'	Stadium: Berakas Track and Field Complex; Attendance: 1,000; Referee: Nguyễn Văn Mùi (Vietnam)

9 August 1999 SEA Games	Cambodia	0–2	Singapore	Bandar Seri Begawan, Brunei
16:00 UTC+8		Report	Zainal 32'; Nasir 80'	Stadium: Berakas Track and Field Complex; Attendance: 300; Referee: Nguyễn Văn Mùi (Vietnam)

4 October 1999 Vietnam Independence Cup	Ho Chi Minh City XI (Vietnam)	2–0	Cambodia	Ho Chi Minh City, Vietnam
		Report

7 October 1999 Vietnam Independence Cup	Cambodia	0–6	(China) Huangdao	Ho Chi Minh City, Vietnam
		Report

9 October 1999 Vietnam Independence Cup	Cuu Long XI (Vietnam)	1–0	Cambodia	Ho Chi Minh City, Vietnam
		Report

18 October 2000 AFC Asian Cup qualification	Hong Kong	4–1	Cambodia	Mong Kok, Hong Kong
	Chen Sin Syu-Chung 34', 52'; Lee Kin Wo 54'; Wong Chi Kyung 83'		Sochetra 40'	Stadium: Mongkok Stadium; Attendance: 5,461

30 October 2000 AFC Asian Cup qualification	Cambodia	1–5	Indonesia	Phnom Penh, Cambodia
	Arunreath 72'		Prasetyo 14'; Pamungkas 28'; Putiray 39', 46'; Sunan 47'	Stadium: Olympic Stadium

7 November 2000 AFC Asian Cup qualification	Cambodia	0–1	Hong Kong	Phnom Penh, Cambodia
			Lai Kai Cheuk 58'	Stadium: Olympic Stadium

20 November 2000 AFC Asian Cup qualification	Indonesia	9–2	Cambodia	Jakarta, Indonesia
	Putiray 2', 38', 90'; Purjianto 15'; Nahumarury 33'; Nawawi 40'; Pamungkas 53', 70'; Putro 85'		Sochetra 13', 58'	Stadium: Senayan Stadium

== 2000 ==
14 October Friendly	Malaysia	2–0	Cambodia	Kuala Lumpur, Malaysia
		Report

17 October Friendly	Malaysia	1–1	Cambodia	Kuala Lumpur, Malaysia
	Suparman (?)	Report	?	Stadium: Stadium Merdeka

5 November 2000 AFF Championship	Singapore	1–0	Cambodia	Songkhla, Thailand
16:30 UTC+7	Rafi Ali 25'	Report		Stadium: Tinsulanon Stadium; Referee: U Tun Hla Aung](Myanmar)

7 November 2000 AFF Championship	Cambodia	0–6	Vietnam	Songkhla, Thailand
19:30 UTC+7		Report	Lê Huỳnh Đức 16', 80'; Nguyễn Văn Sỹ 55'; Nguyễn Hồng Sơn 58'; Vũ Công Tuyền 74', 86'	Stadium: Tinsulanon Stadium; Referee: Hidayat Jajat Sudrajat (Indonesia)

9 November 2000 AFF Championship	Malaysia	3–2	Cambodia	Songkhla, Thailand
16:30 UTC+7	Azman Adnan 21'; Hairuddin Omar 47'; Ahmad Shahrul Azhar Sofian 62'	Report	Pok Chanthan 74'; Hok Sochetra 86'	Stadium: Tinsulanon Stadium; Referee: Hidayat Jajat Sudrajat (Indonesia)

11 November 2000 AFF Championship	Cambodia	3–0	Laos	Songkhla, Thailand
16:30 UTC+7	Hok Sochetra 59', 76'; Chea Makara 70'	Report		Stadium: Tinsulanon Stadium; Referee: Jerry Andres(Philippines)

== 2001 ==
28 March Friendly	Sri Lanka	1–0	Cambodia	Colombo, Sri Lanka
	Jayasuriya 36'	Report

1 April 2002 FIFA World Cup qualification	Maldives	6–0	Cambodia	Malé, Maldives
16:00 UTC+5	Umar 33', 79'; Abdulativ 52', 90'; Shiham 68'; Luthfy 82'	Report		Stadium: Rasmee Dhandu Stadium; Attendance: 11,850; Referee: Abayawansa Mahasena Yapa (Sri Lanka)

15 April 2002 FIFA World Cup qualification	Cambodia	1–1	Maldives	Phnom Penh, Cambodia
15:30 UTC+7	Makara 78'	Report	Naseem 67'	Stadium: Olympic Stadium; Attendance: 3,000; Referee: U Tun Hla Aung (Myanmar)

22 April 2002 FIFA World Cup qualification	Indonesia	6–0	Cambodia	Jakarta, Indonesia
16:00 UTC+7	Nasa 26' (o.g.); Nawawi 42', 46', 71'; Tecuari 73'; Yulianto 76'	Report		Stadium: Gelora Bung Karno Stadium; Attendance: 32,000; Referee: Jerry Andres (Philippines)

29 April 2002 FIFA World Cup qualification	Cambodia	0–2	Indonesia	Phnom Penh, Cambodia
15:30 UTC+7		Report	Purdjianto 78'; Pamungkas 87'	Stadium: Lambert Stadium; Attendance: 7,000; Referee: Michael Andrews (India)

6 May 2002 FIFA World Cup qualification	Cambodia	0–4	China	Phnom Penh, Cambodia
15:30 UTC+7		Report	Li Jinyu 5', 63'; Qu Bo 43'; Ma Mingyu 58'	Stadium: Lambert Stadium; Attendance: 7,000; Referee: Tayeb Shamsuzzaman (Bangladesh)

20 May 2002 FIFA World Cup qualification	China	3–1	Cambodia	Guangzhou, China
19:30 UTC+8	Ma Mingyu 5'; Xu Yunlong 22'; Li Bing 87'	Report	Makara 12'	Stadium: Guangdong Olympic Stadium; Attendance: 27,000; Referee: Buddhi Gurung (Nepal)

== 2002 ==
? November Hybrid Friendly	Cambodia	Unknown	(Australia) ACSSA	Phnom Penh, Cambodia
		Report		Stadium: Olympic Stadium

11 December Friendly	Malaysia	5–0	Cambodia	Selangor, Malaysia
	Indra (?); Zainizam (?); Akmal (?); Hairuddin (?)	Report		Stadium: Petaling Jaya Stadium

15 December 2002 AFF Championship	Vietnam	9–2	Cambodia	Jakarta, Indonesia
19:35 UTC+7	Huỳnh Hồng Sơn 11'; Trần Trường Giang 16', 40'; Nguyễn Quốc Trung 24'; Lê Huỳnh Đức 63', 80'; Nguyễn Minh Phương 75'; Trịnh Xuân Thành 88'; Phạm Văn Quyến 90'	Report	Sochetra 30'; Kanyanith 58'	Stadium: Gelora Bung Karno Stadium; Referee: Santhan Nagalingham (Singapore)

17 December 2002 AFF Championship	Indonesia	4–2	Cambodia	Jakarta, Indonesia
18:35 UTC+7	Zaenal 35'; Bambang 58', 79', 80'	Report	Sochetra 15', 45'	Stadium: Gelora Bung Karno Stadium; Attendance: 20,000; Referee: Khanthachai Virat (Thailand)

19 December 2002 AFF Championship	Myanmar	5–0	Cambodia	Jakarta, Indonesia
16:05 UTC+7	Zaw Zaw 47'; Lwin Oo 57', 77'; Zaw Htaik 69'; T. N. Tun Thein 83'	Report		Stadium: Gelora Bung Karno Stadium; Referee: Abdulhameed Ibrahim (Bahrain)

21 December 2002 AFF Championship	Cambodia	1–0	Philippines	Jakarta, Indonesia
16:05 UTC+7	Kanyanith 90'	Report		Stadium: Gelora Bung Karno Stadium; Referee: Jimmy Napitupulu (Indonesia)

== 2004 ==
9 November Hybrid Friendly	Cambodia	0–7	(Vietnam) Long An	Phnom Penh, Cambodia
		Report		Stadium: Olympic Stadium

9 December 2004 AFF Championship	Vietnam	9–1	Cambodia	Ho Chi Minh City, Vietnam
17:00 UTC+7	Thạch Bảo Khanh 9', 23'; Lê Công Vinh 57', 87', 89'; Sampratna 63' (o.g.); Đặng Văn Thành 71', 83'; Nguyễn Huy Hoàng 77'	Report	Sokunthea 44'	Stadium: Thống Nhất Stadium; Referee: Ahmad Khalidi Supian (Malaysia)

11 December 2004 AFF Championship	Laos	2–1	Cambodia	Hanoi, Vietnam
17:00 UTC+7	Luang-Amath 63', 73'	Report	Darith 27'	Stadium: Mỹ Đình National Stadium; Referee: Kwon Jong-Chul (Korea Republic)

13 December 2004 AFF Championship	Indonesia	8–0	Cambodia	Hanoi, Vietnam
19:30 UTC+7	Ilham 5', 48', 56'; Elie 30', 55'; Kurniawan 74', 76'; Ortizan 90'	Report		Stadium: Mỹ Đình National Stadium; Referee: Sun Baojie (China)

15 December 2004 AFF Championship	Cambodia	0–3	Singapore	Hai Phong, Vietnam
18:00 UTC+7		Report	Dickson 20'; Baihakki 26'; Khairul 54'	Stadium: Lạch Tray Stadium; Referee: Abdulhameed Ebrahim (Bahrain)

== 2005 ==
11 October Friendly	Cambodia	0–2	Singapore	Phnom Penh, Cambodia
		Report	Ishak 44', 80'	Stadium: Olympic Stadium

== 2006 ==
1 April 2006 AFC Challenge Cup	Bangladesh	2–1	Cambodia	Dhaka, Bangladesh
18:00 UTC+6	Alfaz 31'; Ameli 64'	Report	C. Rithy 68'	Stadium: Bangabandhu Stadium; Attendance: 35,000; Referee: Tan Hai (China PR)

3 April 2006 AFC Challenge Cup	Cambodia	0–4	Palestine	Dhaka, Bangladesh
15:30 UTC+6		Report	Keshkesh 10'; Al-Sweirki 12', 75'; Attal 30'	Stadium: Bangabandhu Stadium; Attendance: 2,500; Referee: Ala Abdul Kadir Nema (Iraq)

6 April 2006 AFC Challenge Cup	Cambodia	3–0	Guam	Dhaka, Bangladesh
14:00 UTC+6	S. Buntheang 37'; Kosal 40'; K. Kumpheak 63'	Report		Stadium: Bangladesh Army Stadium; Attendance: 500; Referee: Win Cho (Myanmar)

14 November 2007 AFF Championship qualification	Cambodia	2–2	Laos	Bacolod, Philippines
19:00 UTC+8	Vathanak 50'; Samchay 75'	Report	Soukhavong 30'; Sisomephone 35'	Stadium: Panaad Stadium

16 November 2007 AFF Championship qualification	Brunei	1–1	Cambodia	Bacolod, Philippines
19:00 UTC+8	Hardi 90'	Report	El Nasa 79'	Stadium: Panaad Stadium

18 November 2007 AFF Championship qualification	Philippines	1–0	Cambodia	Bacolod, Philippines
16:30 UTC+8	Borromeo 81' (pen.)	Report		Stadium: Panaad Stadium

20 November 2007 AFF Championship qualification	Timor-Leste	1–4	Cambodia	Bacolod, Philippines
19:00 UTC+8	Costa 63'	Report	Samchay 37'; T. Vathanak 58'; C. Rithy 82', 86'	Stadium: Panaad Stadium

28 December Hybrid Friendly	Cambodia	2-3	(South Korea) Suwon City FC	Phnom Penh, Cambodia
		Report		Stadium: Olympic Stadium

== 2007 ==
20 February Hybrid Friendly	Cambodia	2-3	(South Korea) Ulsan Hyundai B	Phnom Penh, Cambodia
		Report		Stadium: Olympic Stadium

18 June Friendly	Malaysia	6–0	Cambodia	Selangor, Malaysia
	Talib 23'; Yusoff 47'; Hairuddin 58'; Helmi 61', 88'; Zafuan 90'	Report		Stadium: Shah Alam Stadium

17 August 2007 Nehru Cup	India	6–0	Cambodia	New Delhi, India
18:30 UTC+5:30	Pradeep 16'; Bhutia 45+4' (pen.); Dias 73', 90'; Chhetri 83', 84'	Report		Stadium: Ambedkar Stadium; Referee: Pepera Hetti Kamkanamge (Sri Lanka)

19 August 2007 Nehru Cup	Kyrgyzstan	4–3	Cambodia	New Delhi, India
19:00 UTC+5:30	Samsaliev 12'; Mamatov 17'; Djamshidov 48'; Harchenko 65'	Report	Sotitya 34'; Rithy 40'; Chum 43'	Stadium: Ambedkar Stadium; Referee: Srinivasan Suresh (India)

22 August 2007 Nehru Cup	Bangladesh	1–1	Cambodia	New Delhi, India
19:00 UTC+5:30	Abul 30'	Report	Kasal 90'	Stadium: Ambedkar Stadium; Referee: A. Arjunan (India)

25 August 2007 Nehru Cup	Cambodia	1–5	Syria	New Delhi, India
19:00 UTC+5:30	Vathanak 69'	Report	Al Zeno 25'; Chaabo 35'; Al Sayed 51', 86'; Jenyat 80'	Stadium: Ambedkar Stadium; Referee: Pepera Hetti Kamkanamge (Sri Lanka)

11 October 2010 FIFA World Cup qualification	Cambodia	0–1	Turkmenistan	Phnom Penh, Cambodia
15:00 UTC+7		Report	Karadanov 85'	Stadium: Olympic Stadium; Attendance: 3,000; Referee: Ram Gosh (Bangladesh)

28 October 2010 FIFA World Cup qualification	Turkmenistan	4–1 (5–1 agg.)	Cambodia	Ashgabat, Turkmenistan
18:00 UTC+5	Nasyrov 41'; Gevorkyan 50', 66'; Karadanov 74'	Report	Nasa 12'	Stadium: Olympic Stadium (Saparmurat); Attendance: 5,000; Referee: Rustam Saidov (Uzbekistan)

== 2008 ==
26 May 2008 AFC Challenge Cup qualification	Cambodia	0–1	Nepal	Phnom Penh, Cambodia
15:00 UTC+7		Report	J.M. Rai 44'	Stadium: Olympic Stadium; Attendance: 3,000; Referee: Mohsen Torky (Iran)

28 May 2008 AFC Challenge Cup qualification	Cambodia	3–1	Macau	Phnom Penh, Cambodia
15:00 UTC+7	Sinoun 30', 90+2'; Rithy 67'	Report	Che Chi Man 65'	Stadium: Olympic Stadium; Attendance: 3,000; Referee: Çarymyrat Gurbanow (Turkmenistan)

21 August 2008 Indonesia Independence Cup	Cambodia	0–7	Indonesia	Jakarta, Indonesia
21:15 UTC+7		Report	Yulianto 8'; Budi S. 11', 28', 30', 36'; M. Ilham 51'; Bambang P. 88'	Stadium: Gelora Bung Karno Stadium; Attendance: 1,200

22 August 2008 Indonesia Independence Cup	Myanmar	7–1	Cambodia	Jakarta, Indonesia
21:45 UTC+7	Khin 7'; Thien 21', 45', 76'; Min 50'; Yan 62', 87'	Report	Borey 17'	Stadium: Gelora Bung Karno Stadium; Attendance: 3,000

4 September Hybrid Friendly	Cambodia	5-2	(Nigeria) Nigerian Domestic MCL XI	Phnom Penh, Cambodia
		Report		Stadium: Olympic Stadium

17 October 2007 AFF Championship qualification	Cambodia	3–2	Laos	Phnom Penh, Cambodia
16:00 UTC+7	Borey 24'; El Nasa 45'; Sovannarith 55'	Report	Lounglath 30'; Liepvisay 78'	Stadium: Olympic Stadium; Attendance: 15,000

19 October 2007 AFF Championship qualification	Cambodia	2–2	Timor-Leste	Phnom Penh, Cambodia
14:00 UTC+7	Borey 78' (pen.); Sovannarith 80'	Report	Barbosa 45'; J.J. Pereira 67' (pen.)	Stadium: Olympic Stadium; Attendance: 12,000

23 October 2007 AFF Championship qualification	Cambodia	2–3	Philippines	Phnom Penh, Cambodia
16:00 UTC+7	El Nasa 14', 44'	Report	Borromeo 19'; C. Greatwich 36'; Gould 53'	Stadium: Olympic Stadium; Attendance: 15,000

25 October 2007 AFF Championship qualification	Cambodia	2–1	Brunei	Phnom Penh, Cambodia
14:00 UTC+7	El Nasa 45'; Borey 73'	Report	Hardi 44'	Stadium: Olympic Stadium; Attendance: 15,000

5 December 2008 AFF Championship	Singapore	5–0	Cambodia	Jakarta, Indonesia
17:00 UTC+7	Casmir 44', 73'; Mustafić 61' (pen.); Sahdan 71'; Alam Shah 89'	Report		Stadium: Gelora Bung Karno Stadium; Attendance: 18,000; Referee: Chaiya Mahapab (Thailand)

7 December 2008 AFF Championship	Cambodia	0–4	Indonesia	Jakarta, Indonesia
19:30 UTC+7		Report	Budi 15', 54', 70'; Bambang 76'	Stadium: Gelora Bung Karno Stadium; Attendance: 30,000; Referee: Mohd Nafeez Abdul Wahab (Malaysia)

9 December 2008 AFF Championship	Myanmar	3–2	Cambodia	Bandung, Indonesia
19:30 UTC+7	Moe Win 29'; Ya Zar Win Thein 35'; Myo Min Tun 85'	Report	Sokumpheak 40'; Borey 77'	Stadium: Jalak Harupat Stadium; Referee: Allan Martinez (Philippines)

== 2009 ==
26 April 2010 AFC Challenge Cup qualification	Cambodia	0–1	Bangladesh	Dhaka, Bangladesh
18:00 UTC+6		Report	Enamul 73'	Stadium: Bangabandhu National Stadium; Attendance: 8,060; Referee: Saeid Mozaffarizadeh (Iran)

28 April 2010 AFC Challenge Cup qualification	Macau	1–2	Cambodia	Dhaka, Bangladesh
15:30 UTC+6	Che Chi Man 75'	Report	Vathanak 12'; Sokngon 66'	Stadium: Bangabandhu National Stadium; Attendance: 6,000; Referee: Ali Saleem (Maldives)

30 April 2010 AFC Challenge Cup qualification	Myanmar	1–0	Cambodia	Dhaka, Bangladesh
15:30 UTC+6	Yazar Win Thein 90+4'	Report		Stadium: Bangabandhu National Stadium; Attendance: 2,500; Referee: Saeid Mozaffarizadeh (Iran)

== Head-to-head records ==
Cambodia national football team head-to-head records (1983–2009)
Opponent	Pld	W	D	L	GF	GA	GD	Pts	Confederation
Bangladesh	3	0	1	2	2	4	–2	1	AFC
Brunei	4	2	2	0	10	5	+5	8	AFC
China	3	0	0	3	2	11	–9	0	AFC
Guam	1	1	0	0	3	0	+3	3	AFC
Hong Kong	2	0	0	2	1	5	–4	0	AFC
India	1	0	0	1	0	6	–6	0	AFC
Indonesia	13	0	1	12	6	68	–62	1	AFC
Kyrgyzstan	1	0	0	1	3	4	–1	0	AFC
Laos	5	2	1	2	9	7	+2	7	AFC
Lebanon	1	0	0	1	1	5	–4	0	AFC
Macau	2	2	0	0	5	2	+3	6	AFC
Malaysia	7	0	1	6	5	33	–28	1	AFC
Maldives	2	0	1	1	1	7	–6	1	AFC
Myanmar	6	1	0	5	6	22	–16	3	AFC
Nepal	1	0	0	1	0	1	–1	0	AFC
Palestine	1	0	0	1	0	4	–4	0	AFC
Philippines	5	1	2	2	5	6	–1	5	AFC
Singapore	7	0	0	7	1	18	–17	0	AFC
Sri Lanka	1	0	0	1	0	1	–1	0	AFC
Syria	1	0	0	1	1	5	–4	0	AFC
Thailand	3	0	0	3	0	21	–21	0	AFC
Timor-Leste	2	1	1	0	6	3	+3	4	AFC
Turkmenistan	2	0	0	2	1	5	–4	0	AFC
Uzbekistan	2	0	0	2	1	10	–9	0	AFC
Vietnam	7	0	1	6	5	35	–30	1	AFC
Yemen	2	0	0	2	0	8	–8	0	AFC
Total	85	10	11	64	74	296	–222	41	
