= Cambodia national football team results (2000–2009) =

This article provides details of international football games played by the Cambodia national football team from the 2000 to 2009.

== 2000 ==
14 October Friendly	Malaysia	2–0	Cambodia	Kuala Lumpur, Malaysia
		Report

17 October Friendly	Malaysia	1–1	Cambodia	Kuala Lumpur, Malaysia
	Suparman (?)	Report	?	Stadium: Stadium Merdeka

5 November 2000 AFF Championship	Singapore	1–0	Cambodia	Songkhla, Thailand
16:30 UTC+7	Rafi Ali 25'	Report		Stadium: Tinsulanon Stadium; Referee: U Tun Hla Aung](Myanmar)

7 November 2000 AFF Championship	Cambodia	0–6	Vietnam	Songkhla, Thailand
19:30 UTC+7		Report	Lê Huỳnh Đức 16', 80'; Nguyễn Văn Sỹ 55'; Nguyễn Hồng Sơn 58'; Vũ Công Tuyền 74', 86'	Stadium: Tinsulanon Stadium; Referee: Hidayat Jajat Sudrajat (Indonesia)

9 November 2000 AFF Championship	Malaysia	3–2	Cambodia	Songkhla, Thailand
16:30 UTC+7	Azman Adnan 21'; Hairuddin Omar 47'; Ahmad Shahrul Azhar Sofian 62'	Report	Pok Chanthan 74'; Hok Sochetra 86'	Stadium: Tinsulanon Stadium; Referee: Hidayat Jajat Sudrajat (Indonesia)

11 November 2000 AFF Championship	Cambodia	3–0	Laos	Songkhla, Thailand
16:30 UTC+7	Hok Sochetra 59', 76'; Chea Makara 70'	Report		Stadium: Tinsulanon Stadium; Referee: Jerry Andres(Philippines)

== 2001 ==
28 March Friendly	Sri Lanka	1–0	Cambodia	Colombo, Sri Lanka
	Jayasuriya 36'	Report

1 April 2002 FIFA World Cup qualification	Maldives	6–0	Cambodia	Malé, Maldives
16:00 UTC+5	Umar 33', 79'; Abdulativ 52', 90'; Shiham 68'; Luthfy 82'	Report		Stadium: Rasmee Dhandu Stadium; Attendance: 11,850; Referee: Abayawansa Mahasena Yapa (Sri Lanka)

15 April 2002 FIFA World Cup qualification	Cambodia	1–1	Maldives	Phnom Penh, Cambodia
15:30 UTC+7	Makara 78'	Report	Naseem 67'	Stadium: Olympic Stadium; Attendance: 3,000; Referee: U Tun Hla Aung (Myanmar)

22 April 2002 FIFA World Cup qualification	Indonesia	6–0	Cambodia	Jakarta, Indonesia
16:00 UTC+7	Nasa 26' (o.g.); Nawawi 42', 46', 71'; Tecuari 73'; Yulianto 76'	Report		Stadium: Gelora Bung Karno Stadium; Attendance: 32,000; Referee: Jerry Andres (Philippines)

29 April 2002 FIFA World Cup qualification	Cambodia	0–2	Indonesia	Phnom Penh, Cambodia
15:30 UTC+7		Report	Purdjianto 78'; Pamungkas 87'	Stadium: Lambert Stadium; Attendance: 7,000; Referee: Michael Andrews (India)

6 May 2002 FIFA World Cup qualification	Cambodia	0–4	China	Phnom Penh, Cambodia
15:30 UTC+7		Report	Li Jinyu 5', 63'; Qu Bo 43'; Ma Mingyu 58'	Stadium: Lambert Stadium; Attendance: 7,000; Referee: Tayeb Shamsuzzaman (Bangladesh)

20 May 2002 FIFA World Cup qualification	China	3–1	Cambodia	Guangzhou, China
19:30 UTC+8	Ma Mingyu 5'; Xu Yunlong 22'; Li Bing 87'	Report	Makara 12'	Stadium: Guangdong Olympic Stadium; Attendance: 27,000; Referee: Buddhi Gurung (Nepal)

== 2002 ==
? November Hybrid Friendly	Cambodia	Unknown	(Australia) ACSSA	Phnom Penh, Cambodia
		Report		Stadium: Olympic Stadium

11 December Friendly	Malaysia	5–0	Cambodia	Selangor, Malaysia
	Indra (?); Zainizam (?); Akmal (?); Hairuddin (?)	Report		Stadium: Petaling Jaya Stadium

15 December 2002 AFF Championship	Vietnam	9–2	Cambodia	Jakarta, Indonesia
19:35 UTC+7	Huỳnh Hồng Sơn 11'; Trần Trường Giang 16', 40'; Nguyễn Quốc Trung 24'; Lê Huỳnh Đức 63', 80'; Nguyễn Minh Phương 75'; Trịnh Xuân Thành 88'; Phạm Văn Quyến 90'	Report	Sochetra 30'; Kanyanith 58'	Stadium: Gelora Bung Karno Stadium; Referee: Santhan Nagalingham (Singapore)

17 December 2002 AFF Championship	Indonesia	4–2	Cambodia	Jakarta, Indonesia
18:35 UTC+7	Zaenal 35'; Bambang 58', 79', 80'	Report	Sochetra 15', 45'	Stadium: Gelora Bung Karno Stadium; Attendance: 20,000; Referee: Khanthachai Virat (Thailand)

19 December 2002 AFF Championship	Myanmar	5–0	Cambodia	Jakarta, Indonesia
16:05 UTC+7	Zaw Zaw 47'; Lwin Oo 57', 77'; Zaw Htaik 69'; T. N. Tun Thein 83'	Report		Stadium: Gelora Bung Karno Stadium; Referee: Abdulhameed Ibrahim (Bahrain)

21 December 2002 AFF Championship	Cambodia	1–0	Philippines	Jakarta, Indonesia
16:05 UTC+7	Kanyanith 90'	Report		Stadium: Gelora Bung Karno Stadium; Referee: Jimmy Napitupulu (Indonesia)

== 2004 ==
9 November Hybrid Friendly	Cambodia	0–7	(Vietnam) Long An	Phnom Penh, Cambodia
		Report		Stadium: Olympic Stadium

9 December 2004 AFF Championship	Vietnam	9–1	Cambodia	Ho Chi Minh City, Vietnam
17:00 UTC+7	Thạch Bảo Khanh 9', 23'; Lê Công Vinh 57', 87', 89'; Sampratna 63' (o.g.); Đặng Văn Thành 71', 83'; Nguyễn Huy Hoàng 77'	Report	Sokunthea 44'	Stadium: Thống Nhất Stadium; Referee: Ahmad Khalidi Supian (Malaysia)

11 December 2004 AFF Championship	Laos	2–1	Cambodia	Hanoi, Vietnam
17:00 UTC+7	Luang-Amath 63', 73'	Report	Darith 27'	Stadium: Mỹ Đình National Stadium; Referee: Kwon Jong-Chul (Korea Republic)

13 December 2004 AFF Championship	Indonesia	8–0	Cambodia	Hanoi, Vietnam
19:30 UTC+7	Ilham 5', 48', 56'; Elie 30', 55'; Kurniawan 74', 76'; Ortizan 90'	Report		Stadium: Mỹ Đình National Stadium; Referee: Sun Baojie (China)

15 December 2004 AFF Championship	Cambodia	0–3	Singapore	Hai Phong, Vietnam
18:00 UTC+7		Report	Dickson 20'; Baihakki 26'; Khairul 54'	Stadium: Lạch Tray Stadium; Referee: Abdulhameed Ebrahim (Bahrain)

== 2005 ==
11 October Friendly	Cambodia	0–2	Singapore	Phnom Penh, Cambodia
		Report	Ishak 44', 80'	Stadium: Olympic Stadium

== 2006 ==
1 April 2006 AFC Challenge Cup	Bangladesh	2–1	Cambodia	Dhaka, Bangladesh
18:00 UTC+6	Alfaz 31'; Ameli 64'	Report	C. Rithy 68'	Stadium: Bangabandhu Stadium; Attendance: 35,000; Referee: Tan Hai (China PR)

3 April 2006 AFC Challenge Cup	Cambodia	0–4	Palestine	Dhaka, Bangladesh
15:30 UTC+6		Report	Keshkesh 10'; Al-Sweirki 12', 75'; Attal 30'	Stadium: Bangabandhu Stadium; Attendance: 2,500; Referee: Ala Abdul Kadir Nema (Iraq)

6 April 2006 AFC Challenge Cup	Cambodia	3–0	Guam	Dhaka, Bangladesh
14:00 UTC+6	S. Buntheang 37'; Kosal 40'; K. Kumpheak 63'	Report		Stadium: Bangladesh Army Stadium; Attendance: 500; Referee: Win Cho (Myanmar)

14 November 2007 AFF Championship qualification	Cambodia	2–2	Laos	Bacolod, Philippines
19:00 UTC+8	Vathanak 50'; Samchay 75'	Report	Soukhavong 30'; Sisomephone 35'	Stadium: Panaad Stadium

16 November 2007 AFF Championship qualification	Brunei	1–1	Cambodia	Bacolod, Philippines
19:00 UTC+8	Hardi 90'	Report	El Nasa 79'	Stadium: Panaad Stadium

18 November 2007 AFF Championship qualification	Philippines	1–0	Cambodia	Bacolod, Philippines
16:30 UTC+8	Borromeo 81' (pen.)	Report		Stadium: Panaad Stadium

20 November 2007 AFF Championship qualification	Timor-Leste	1–4	Cambodia	Bacolod, Philippines
19:00 UTC+8	Costa 63'	Report	Samchay 37'; T. Vathanak 58'; C. Rithy 82', 86'	Stadium: Panaad Stadium

== 2007 ==
18 June Friendly	Malaysia	6–0	Cambodia	Selangor, Malaysia
	Talib 23'; Yusoff 47'; Hairuddin 58'; Helmi 61', 88'; Zafuan 90'	Report		Stadium: Shah Alam Stadium

17 August 2007 Nehru Cup	India	6–0	Cambodia	New Delhi, India
18:30 UTC+5:30	Pradeep 16'; Bhutia 45+4' (pen.); Dias 73', 90'; Chhetri 83', 84'	Report		Stadium: Ambedkar Stadium; Referee: Pepera Hetti Kamkanamge (Sri Lanka)

19 August 2007 Nehru Cup	Kyrgyzstan	4–3	Cambodia	New Delhi, India
19:00 UTC+5:30	Samsaliev 12'; Mamatov 17'; Djamshidov 48'; Harchenko 65'	Report	Sotitya 34'; Rithy 40'; Chum 43'	Stadium: Ambedkar Stadium; Referee: Srinivasan Suresh (India)

22 August 2007 Nehru Cup	Bangladesh	1–1	Cambodia	New Delhi, India
19:00 UTC+5:30	Abul 30'	Report	Kasal 90'	Stadium: Ambedkar Stadium; Referee: A. Arjunan (India)

25 August 2007 Nehru Cup	Cambodia	1–5	Syria	New Delhi, India
19:00 UTC+5:30	Vathanak 69'	Report	Al Zeno 25'; Chaabo 35'; Al Sayed 51', 86'; Jenyat 80'	Stadium: Ambedkar Stadium; Referee: Pepera Hetti Kamkanamge (Sri Lanka)

11 October 2010 FIFA World Cup qualification	Cambodia	0–1	Turkmenistan	Phnom Penh, Cambodia
15:00 UTC+7		Report	Karadanov 85'	Stadium: Olympic Stadium; Attendance: 3,000; Referee: Ram Gosh (Bangladesh)

28 October 2010 FIFA World Cup qualification	Turkmenistan	4–1 (5–1 agg.)	Cambodia	Ashgabat, Turkmenistan
18:00 UTC+5	Nasyrov 41'; Gevorkyan 50', 66'; Karadanov 74'	Report	Nasa 12'	Stadium: Olympic Stadium (Saparmurat); Attendance: 5,000; Referee: Rustam Saidov (Uzbekistan)

28 December Hybrid Friendly	Cambodia	2-3	(South Korea) Suwon City FC	Phnom Penh, Cambodia
		Report		Stadium: Olympic Stadium

== 2008 ==
20 February Hybrid Friendly	Cambodia	2-3	(South Korea) Ulsan Hyundai B	Phnom Penh, Cambodia
		Report		Stadium: Olympic Stadium

26 May 2008 AFC Challenge Cup qualification	Cambodia	0–1	Nepal	Phnom Penh, Cambodia
15:00 UTC+7		Report	J.M. Rai 44'	Stadium: Olympic Stadium; Attendance: 3,000; Referee: Mohsen Torky (Iran)

28 May 2008 AFC Challenge Cup qualification	Cambodia	3–1	Macau	Phnom Penh, Cambodia
15:00 UTC+7	Sinoun 30', 90+2'; Rithy 67'	Report	Che Chi Man 65'	Stadium: Olympic Stadium; Attendance: 3,000; Referee: Çarymyrat Gurbanow (Turkmenistan)

21 August 2008 Indonesia Independence Cup	Cambodia	0–7	Indonesia	Jakarta, Indonesia
21:15 UTC+7		Report	Yulianto 8'; Budi S. 11', 28', 30', 36'; M. Ilham 51'; Bambang P. 88'	Stadium: Gelora Bung Karno Stadium; Attendance: 1,200

22 August 2008 Indonesia Independence Cup	Myanmar	7–1	Cambodia	Jakarta, Indonesia
21:45 UTC+7	Khin 7'; Thien 21', 45', 76'; Min 50'; Yan 62', 87'	Report	Borey 17'	Stadium: Gelora Bung Karno Stadium; Attendance: 3,000

17 October 2007 AFF Championship qualification	Cambodia	3–2	Laos	Phnom Penh, Cambodia
16:00 UTC+7	Borey 24'; El Nasa 45'; Sovannarith 55'	Report	Lounglath 30'; Liepvisay 78'	Stadium: Olympic Stadium; Attendance: 15,000

19 October 2007 AFF Championship qualification	Cambodia	2–2	Timor-Leste	Phnom Penh, Cambodia
14:00 UTC+7	Borey 78' (pen.); Sovannarith 80'	Report	Barbosa 45'; J.J. Pereira 67' (pen.)	Stadium: Olympic Stadium; Attendance: 12,000

23 October 2007 AFF Championship qualification	Cambodia	2–3	Philippines	Phnom Penh, Cambodia
16:00 UTC+7	El Nasa 14', 44'	Report	Borromeo 19'; C. Greatwich 36'; Gould 53'	Stadium: Olympic Stadium; Attendance: 15,000

25 October 2007 AFF Championship qualification	Cambodia	2–1	Brunei	Phnom Penh, Cambodia
14:00 UTC+7	El Nasa 45'; Borey 73'	Report	Hardi 44'	Stadium: Olympic Stadium; Attendance: 15,000

5 December 2008 AFF Championship	Singapore	5–0	Cambodia	Jakarta, Indonesia
17:00 UTC+7	Casmir 44', 73'; Mustafić 61' (pen.); Sahdan 71'; Alam Shah 89'	Report		Stadium: Gelora Bung Karno Stadium; Attendance: 18,000; Referee: Chaiya Mahapab (Thailand)

7 December 2008 AFF Championship	Cambodia	0–4	Indonesia	Jakarta, Indonesia
19:30 UTC+7		Report	Budi 15', 54', 70'; Bambang 76'	Stadium: Gelora Bung Karno Stadium; Attendance: 30,000; Referee: Mohd Nafeez Abdul Wahab (Malaysia)

9 December 2008 AFF Championship	Myanmar	3–2	Cambodia	Bandung, Indonesia
19:30 UTC+7	Moe Win 29'; Ya Zar Win Thein 35'; Myo Min Tun 85'	Report	Sokumpheak 40'; Borey 77'	Stadium: Jalak Harupat Stadium; Referee: Allan Martinez (Philippines)

== 2009 ==
26 April 2010 AFC Challenge Cup qualification	Cambodia	0–1	Bangladesh	Dhaka, Bangladesh
18:00 UTC+6		Report	Enamul 73'	Stadium: Bangabandhu National Stadium; Attendance: 8,060; Referee: Saeid Mozaffarizadeh (Iran)

28 April 2010 AFC Challenge Cup qualification	Macau	1–2	Cambodia	Dhaka, Bangladesh
15:30 UTC+6	Che Chi Man 75'	Report	Vathanak 12'; Sokngon 66'	Stadium: Bangabandhu National Stadium; Attendance: 6,000; Referee: Ali Saleem (Maldives)

30 April 2010 AFC Challenge Cup qualification	Myanmar	1–0	Cambodia	Dhaka, Bangladesh
15:30 UTC+6	Yazar Win Thein 90+4'	Report		Stadium: Bangabandhu National Stadium; Attendance: 2,500; Referee: Saeid Mozaffarizadeh (Iran)
