= Panaad =

Panaad may refer to:

- Panaad sa Negros Festival, a festival held in Bacolod City, Philippines
- Panaad Park and Sports Complex, a recreational park and sports complex in Bacolod City, Philippines
  - Panaad Stadium, a stadium within the Panaad Park and Sports Complex
