= Adie Arsham Salleh =

Bruneian footballer

Adie Arsham
Personal information
- Full name: Adie Arsham bin Muhammad Salleh
- Date of birth: 6 January 1988 (age 38)
- Place of birth: Belait, Brunei
- Position: Striker

Senior career*
Years	Team	Apps	(Gls)
2005–2006	March United		
2006–2014	QAF		
2015	Jerudong		(1)
2016	Al-Idrus		(10)
2017–2018	Wijaya		(0)

International career^{‡}
2006–2009	Brunei	10	(3)
- * Club domestic league appearances and goals as of 26 December 2018 ‡ National team caps and goals as of 27 April 2016

Adie Arsham bin Muhammad Salleh (born 6 January 1988) is a Bruneian former footballer who played as a striker. He appeared in 10 matches for the Brunei national football team.

== Club career ==
He previously played for March United, then QAF FC in the Brunei Liga Premier I and later Brunei Super League until 2014. In amongst a pool of strikers in Cameroonian import Viban Bayong, captain Riwandi Wahit and Hamizan Aziz Sulaiman, he nevertheless managed a healthy goals return for the three-time champions, averaging 7 a season.

Adie was one of a host of QAF players to move to Jerudong FC in 2015 after their former team declined to continue playing in the Bruneian top flight. He was constantly overlooked in place of Hardi Bujang and Bazli Said and only managed one goal against Kilanas FC on 15 June.

Adie transferred to newly promoted Al-Idrus FC in the Brunei Premier League in 2016. He finished the season with 10 goals.

== International career ==
Adie played for the Brunei national football team while the team was represented by his then club QAF FC in 2006 and 2009. He scored his first international goal against Nepal in the 2006 AFC Challenge Cup on 4 April. He scored a brace in Brunei's 2–3 win against Timor-Leste on 12 November in the 2007 AFF Championship qualifying.

== International goals ==
Goal	Date	Venue	Opponent	Score	Result	Competition
1.	4 April 2006	MA Aziz Stadium, Chittagong, Bangladesh	Nepal	1–0	2–1	2006 AFC Challenge Cup
2.	12 November 2006	Panaad Stadium, Bacolod, Philippines	Timor-Leste	1–0	3–2	2007 AFF Championship qualification
3.	12 November 2006	Panaad Stadium, Bacolod, Philippines	Timor-Leste	3–1	3–2	2007 AFF Championship qualification

== Honours ==
QAF FC

- Brunei Premier League (3): 2005–06, 2007–08, 2009–10
- Brunei League Cup (2): 2008, 2009

== Personal life ==
His brother is Bruneian international footballer Khayrun Salleh.
