= Visay Phaphouvanin =

Laotian footballer

Personal information
- Date of birth: 12 June 1985 (age 41)
- Place of birth: Vientiane, Laos
- Height: 1.68 m (5 ft 6 in)
- Position: Striker

Youth career
- Vientiane FC

Senior career*
Years	Team	Apps	(Gls)
2003–2004	Udon Thani	19	(7)
2004–2013	Vientiane FC	83	(36)
2013–2016	Lao Police Club	64	(23)

International career^{‡}
2001–2007	Laos U23		
2002–2013	Laos	51	(18)
- * Club domestic league appearances and goals as of June 07, 2014 ‡ National team caps and goals as of March 06, 2013

Visay Phaphouvanin (born 12 June 1985) is a Laotian professional footballer who plays as a striker. He is a member of Laos national football team, for which he played at the 2010 AFF Suzuki Cup and 2014 FIFA World Cup qualifiers.

== International goals ==
Scores and results list Laos' goal tally first.

List of international goals scored by Visay Phaphouvanin
No.	Date	Venue	Opponent	Score	Result	Competition
1.	18 December 2002	National Stadium, Singapore	Thailand	1–3	1–5	2002 AFF Championship
2.	20 December 2002	National Stadium, Singapore	Singapore	1–1	1–2	2002 AFF Championship
3.	22 December 2002	Bishan Stadium, Singapore	Malaysia	1–1	1–1	2002 AFF Championship
4.	25 March 2003	Mongkok Stadium, Hong Kong	Hong Kong	1–4	1–5	2004 AFC Asian Cup qualification
5.	27 March 2003	Mongkok Stadium, Hong Kong	Bangladesh	2–0	2–1	2004 AFC Asian Cup qualification
6.	13 October 2004	Laos National Stadium, Vientiane	Jordan	1–0	2–3	2006 FIFA World Cup qualification
7.	13 December 2004	Mỹ Đình National Stadium, Hanoi	Singapore	1–2	2–6	2004 AFF Championship
8.	12 November 2006	Panaad Stadium, Bacolod	Philippines	2–0	2–1	2007 AFF Championship qualification
9.	18 November 2006	Panaad Stadium, Bacolod	Brunei	2–0	4–1	2007 AFF Championship qualification
10.	22 August 2007	MBPJ Stadium, Petaling Jaya	Lesotho	1–2	1–3	2007 Merdeka Tournament
11.	21 October 2008	Olympic Stadium, Phnom Penh	Philippines	2–1	2–1	2008 AFF Championship qualification
12.	23 October 2008	Olympic Stadium, Phnom Penh	Brunei	1–0	3–2	2008 AFF Championship qualification
13.	25 October 2008	Olympic Stadium, Phnom Penh	Timor-Leste	2–1	2–1	2008 AFF Championship qualification
14.	3 July 2011	New Laos National Stadium, Vientiane	Cambodia	5–2	6–2	2014 FIFA World Cup qualification
15.	23 July 2011	Tuodong Stadium, Kunming	China	2–0	2–7	2014 FIFA World Cup qualification
16.	28 July 2011	New Laos National Stadium, Vientiane	China	1–2	1–6	2014 FIFA World Cup qualification
17.	7 October 2012	Thuwunna Stadium, Yangon	Cambodia	1–0	1–0	2012 AFF Championship qualification
18.	9 October 2012	Thuwunna Stadium, Yangon	Timor-Leste	1–2	1–3	2012 AFF Championship qualification
