= Mardi Mirza Abdullah =

Bruneian footballer (born 1984)

Mardi Mirza
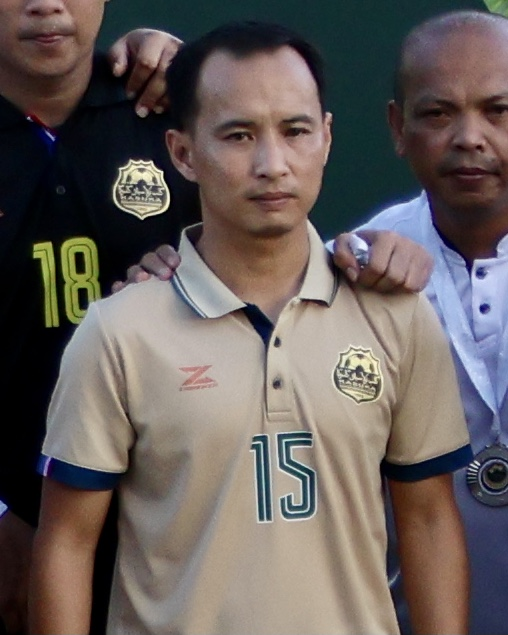
- Mardi in 2022

Personal information
- Full name: Muhammad Mardi Mirza bin Abdullah Bujang
- Date of birth: 19 October 1984 (age 42)
- Place of birth: Seria, Brunei
- Height: 1.69 m (5 ft 7 in)
- Position: Midfielder

Senior career*
Years	Team	Apps	(Gls)
2003–2015	QAF FC		
2008–2009	→ DPMM (loan)		(0)
2015	Jerudong FC		(4)
2016–2022	Kasuka FC		(10)

International career^{‡}
2005	Brunei U21		
2006–2015	Brunei	10	(1)
- * Club domestic league appearances and goals as of 4 March 2023 ‡ National team caps and goals as of 26 April 2016

Muhammad Mardi Mirza bin Abdullah, formerly known as Mardi Anak Bujang (born 19 October 1984) is a Bruneian footballer who last played for Kasuka FC as a midfielder.

Mardi spent most of his footballing career at QAF FC, with a brief spell on loan at DPMM FC in 2008. He moved to Jerudong FC after QAF FC waived entry to the 2015 Brunei Super League. At the start of the 2016 season, he moved to newly promoted Kasuka FC.

== International career ==
Mardi first played for Brunei on 2 April 2006 against Sri Lanka in a 1–0 defeat. He scored his first goal for the national team in a 3–2 win against Timor-Leste on 12 November later that year. His club side QAF FC were representing Brunei for the 2006 AFC Challenge Cup and 2007 AFF Championship qualification. Previously, Mardi played for the Brunei Under-21s at the 2005 Hassanal Bolkiah Trophy.

== Personal life ==
Mardi's twin brother Hardi Bujang is also a Bruneian footballer, making their international debuts at the same match. Mardi went on loan to DPMM FC during Hardi's stint, which means they have played together at QAF FC, DPMM FC, Jerudong FC and the national team. Having both on the field has caused trouble and confusion to referees on one occasion at least.

Mardi, a Bruneian Iban, converted to Islam in April 2009.

== Career statistics ==
Goal	Date	Venue	Opponent	Score	Result	Competition
1.	12 November 2006	Panaad Stadium, Bacolod, Philippines	Timor-Leste	2–1	3–2	2007 AFF Championship qualification
