= Saynakhonevieng Phommapanya =

Laotian footballer

Personal information
- Full name: Saynakhonevieng Phommapanya
- Date of birth: 28 October 1987 (age 39)
- Place of birth: Vientiane, Laos
- Height: 1.70 m (5 ft 7 in)
- Position: Defender

Youth career
- 2003–2004: Vientiane FC

Senior career*
Years	Team	Apps	(Gls)
2005–2009	Vientiane FC	58	(2)
2010–2013	Yotha FC	46	(2)
2014–2017	Lao Toyota FC	2	(0)

International career^{‡}
	Laos U-23	6	(0)
2006–2016	Laos	51	(2)
- * Club domestic league appearances and goals as of June 07, 2014 ‡ National team caps and goals as of June 07, 2014

Saynakhonevieng Phommapanya (born 28 October 1987 in Vientiane) is a Laotian professional footballer. He played as a defender for Vientiane FC, Yotha FC, Lao Toyota FC and the Laos national team.

In 2017, Phommapanya was banned for life from taking part in football-related activities due to match-fixing.

== International goals ==
No.	Date	Venue	Opponent	Score	Result	Competition
1.	16 November 2006	Panaad Stadium, Bacolod, Philippines	Timor-Leste	3–2	3–2	2007 AFF Championship qualification
2.	23 October 2008	Phnom Penh Olympic Stadium, Phnom Penh, Cambodia	Brunei	3–2	3–2	2008 AFF Championship qualification
