= Road to Rio (disambiguation) =

Road to Rio is a 1947 American comedy film directed by Norman Z. McLeod and starring Bing Crosby, Bob Hope, and Dorothy Lamour.

Road to Rio may also refer to:

- Road to Rio (TV program), a TV series from the Philippines about the preparation for the 2014 FIFA World Cup
- Road to Rio (1931 film), a 1931 German crime film directed by Manfred Noa and starring Maria Matray, Oskar Homolka and Oskar Marion

== Other uses ==
- Road to Rio Program, a program that provided all the possible technical and some financial support to selected African badminton players who have the possibility to qualify for the 2016 Rio Olympic Games
