= Asnawi Syazni Abdul Aziz =

Bruneian footballer

Asnawi Syazni
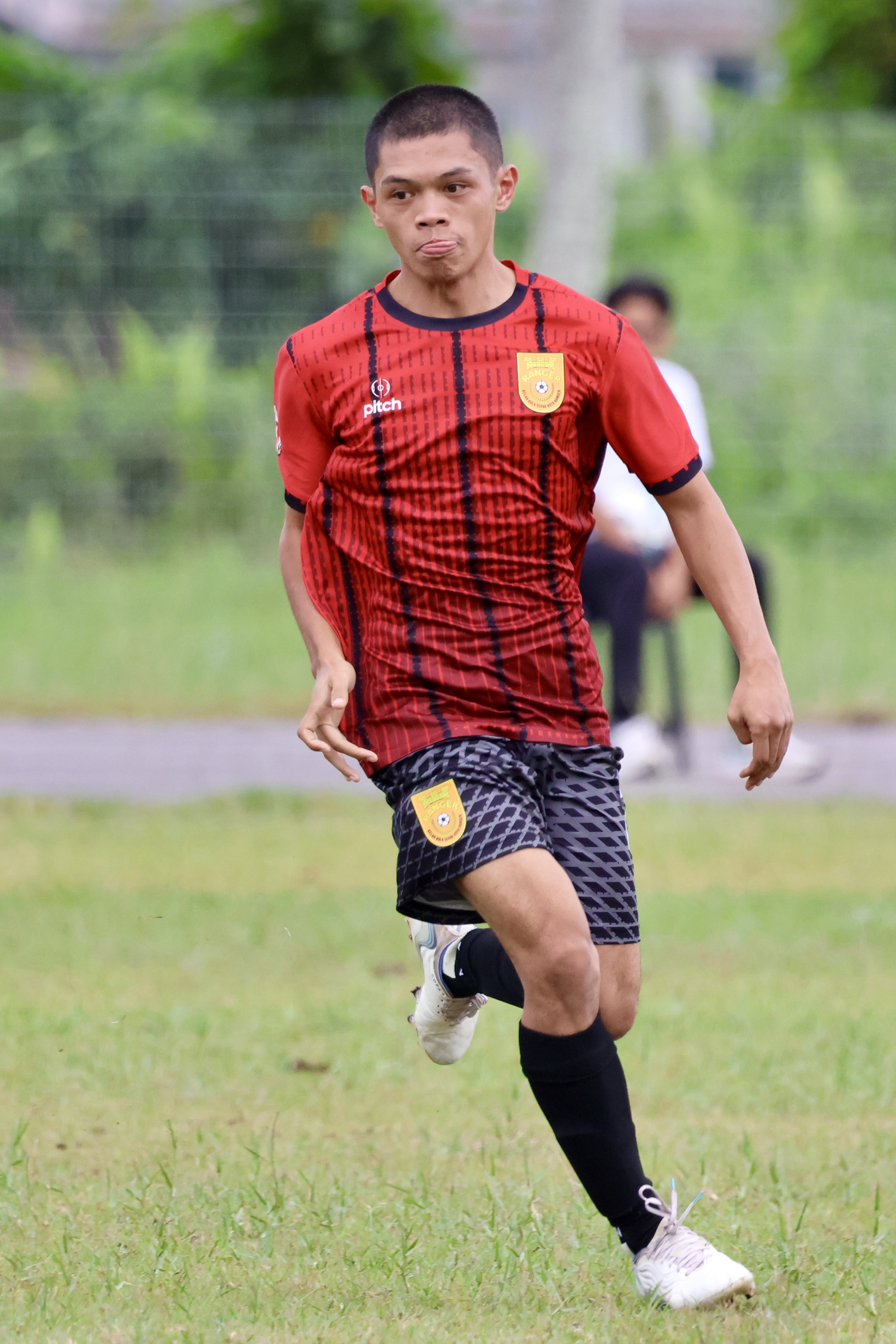
- Asnawi with Kota Ranger in 2024

Personal information
- Full name: Mohammad Asnawi Syazni bin Abdul Aziz
- Date of birth: 16 June 1996 (age 30)
- Place of birth: Brunei
- Height: 1.62 m (5 ft 4 in)
- Positions: Midfielder; left-back

Team information
- Current team: Kota Ranger FC
- Number: 10

Youth career
- 2010–2013: Muara Vella

Senior career*
Years	Team	Apps	(Gls)
2009–2014	Jerudong		
2015–2016	Tabuan Muda		(6)
2017–2018	Jerudong		(4)
2018–2019	Wijaya		(2)
2021	Kota Ranger		
2022	Kasuka	0	(0)
2024–	Kota Ranger	14	(2)

International career^{‡}
2014	Brunei U21	5	(0)
2015–2017	Brunei U23	11	(0)
2016–2020	Brunei	4	(0)
- * Club domestic league appearances and goals as of 13 January 2026 ‡ National team caps and goals as of 21 August 2017

Mohammad Asnawi Syazni bin Abdul Aziz (born 16 June 1996) is a Bruneian footballer who plays for Brunei Super League side Kota Ranger FC as a left-sided midfielder or full-back.

== Club career ==
Asnawi was a student at PDS International School (now known as Seri Mulia Sarjana School) in Jangsak. He was also in the books of Muara Vella's academy which competed in Brunei's youth leagues, and played alongside future Brunei internationals such as Aminuddin Zakwan Tahir. Together they were runners-up of the 2013 NFABD TelBru Youth Under-16 National Football League, losing in the final against Al-Idrus Junior.

Asnawi began playing for Jerudong FC in the 2009–10 Brunei Premier League season, and finished fourth with the help of wonderkid Azwan Ali Rahman. Asnawi helped shoulder the burden of Azwan's departure to Brunei Youth Team in 2011, beginning to play in an advanced role and chipping in with goals despite still being 15 years of age.

Already an established youth international since 2014, Asnawi was transferred to newly formed Tabuan Muda in 2015, playing for the Under-23 team in the Super League. Tabuan Muda finished fifth in the league in 2015 and 2016.

Asnawi returned to Jerudong FC in 2017 after the Super League team of Tabuan Muda was allocated for the Under-18s. He scored his first goal since re-signing for the Jerudong-based team on 30 April against Wijaya FC.

Asnawi joined Wijaya at the start of the 2018-19 Brunei Super League. He scored on his debut against MS ABDB on 27 October in a 1–2 loss. Three years later, Asnawi moved to his fourth club Kota Ranger FC. He spent one incomplete season with the Rangers before joining Kasuka FC, but by the end of his stay, he failed to make a single appearance for the team.

Asnawi subsequently returned to Kota Ranger starting from the 2024–25 season. He scored his first two goals for the Rangers in a 4–1 victory over his previous club Wijaya on 22 September 2024.

== International career ==
=== Youth ===
Asnawi played for the host nation and defending champions Brunei U21 at the 2014 Hassanal Bolkiah Trophy. He played all five matches where Brunei failed to advance from the group stage.

Asnawi next played for the under-23s at the 2016 AFC U-23 Championship qualification in Indonesia in March 2015, and later the 28th SEA Games in Singapore the following June. Altogether he made seven appearances, all of them defeats.

Asnawi returned to the under-23 side for the 2018 AFC U-23 Championship qualification matches held in Myanmar on 19–23 July 2017. He was sent off in the second group game against the hosts towards the end of the first half after a high boot.

=== Senior ===
Asnawi was included in the national squad for the 2016 AFF Suzuki Cup qualification held in Cambodia. He made his international debut as a first-half substitute against hosts Cambodia on 18 October. A fortnight later, he played three games at the 2016 AFC Solidarity Cup in Malaysia where Brunei finished fourth in the new tournament.
