= Alfredo Esteves =

East Timorese football manager (b. 1976)

Personal information
- Full name: Alfredo Manuel Mousinho Esteves
- Date of birth: 6 April 1976 (age 50)
- Place of birth: Lisbon, Portugal
- Height: 1.83 m (6 ft 0 in)
- Position: Defender

Senior career*
Years	Team	Apps	(Gls)
1998–2003	G.D. Gafanha	154	(12)
2003	New Hampshire Phantoms	18	(0)
2003	Paternò Calcio	0	(0)
2003–2004	UD Tocha	19	(2)
2004–2005	Oliveira do Bairro SC	28	(1)
2005–2006	CD Aves	6	(0)
2006–2007	Minnesota Thunder	17	(0)
2007–2010	South Coast Wolves	19	(0)

International career^{‡}
2004–2008	East Timor	14	(1)

Managerial career
- 2014–: Timor-Leste (assistant)
- * Club domestic league appearances and goals as of 29 September 2012 ‡ National team caps and goals as of 25 October 2008

Alfredo Manuel Mousinho Esteves (born 6 April 1976) is a football manager and former player who played as a defender.

Esteves began his management career at Albion Park White Eagles before being sacked in the 2012 season. He is now currently the coach of Fernhill under 20s as well as being the coaching coordinator at Albion Park Junior Football Club.

Born in Portugal, Esteves played for the Timor-Leste national team.

== Early life ==
Esteves was born to a Portuguese father and an East Timorese mother.

== International career ==
Esteves was the captain of the Timor-Leste national football team, and earned 14 caps for the squad between 2003 and 2008 when he decided to retire from the national team. He made his senior international debut in the 2004 Tiger Cup against Malaysia on 12 December 2004 and last played for the national team in the 2008 AFF Suzuki Cup qualification against Laos on 25 October 2008 when he scored his first ever international goal.

=== International goals ===
#	Date	Venue	Opponent	Score	Result	Competition
1	25 October 2008	Phnom Penh National Olympic Stadium, Phnom Penh, Cambodia	Laos	1 – 1	1–2	2008 AFF Suzuki Cup qualification

== Personal life ==
Although born in Portugal, Esteves holds dual citizenship with Timor-Leste.
