= 2008 AFF Championship qualification =

Tournament details
- Host country: Cambodia
- Dates: 17 – 25 October 2008
- Teams: 5
- Venue(s): National Olympic Stadium (in Phnom Penh, Cambodia host cities)

Tournament statistics
- Matches played: 10
- Goals scored: 36 (3.6 per match)
- Top scorer(s): (Cambodia) Sam El Nasa (4 goals)

The 2008 AFF Championship qualification was held in Phnom Penh, Cambodia from 17 to 25 October 2008 for the five lower-ranked teams in Southeast Asia. All teams play in a round-robin tournament format and the top two teams of the group qualify for the tournament proper.

== Venue ==
(Cambodia) Phnom Penh
Phnom Penh Olympic Stadium
Capacity: 50,000
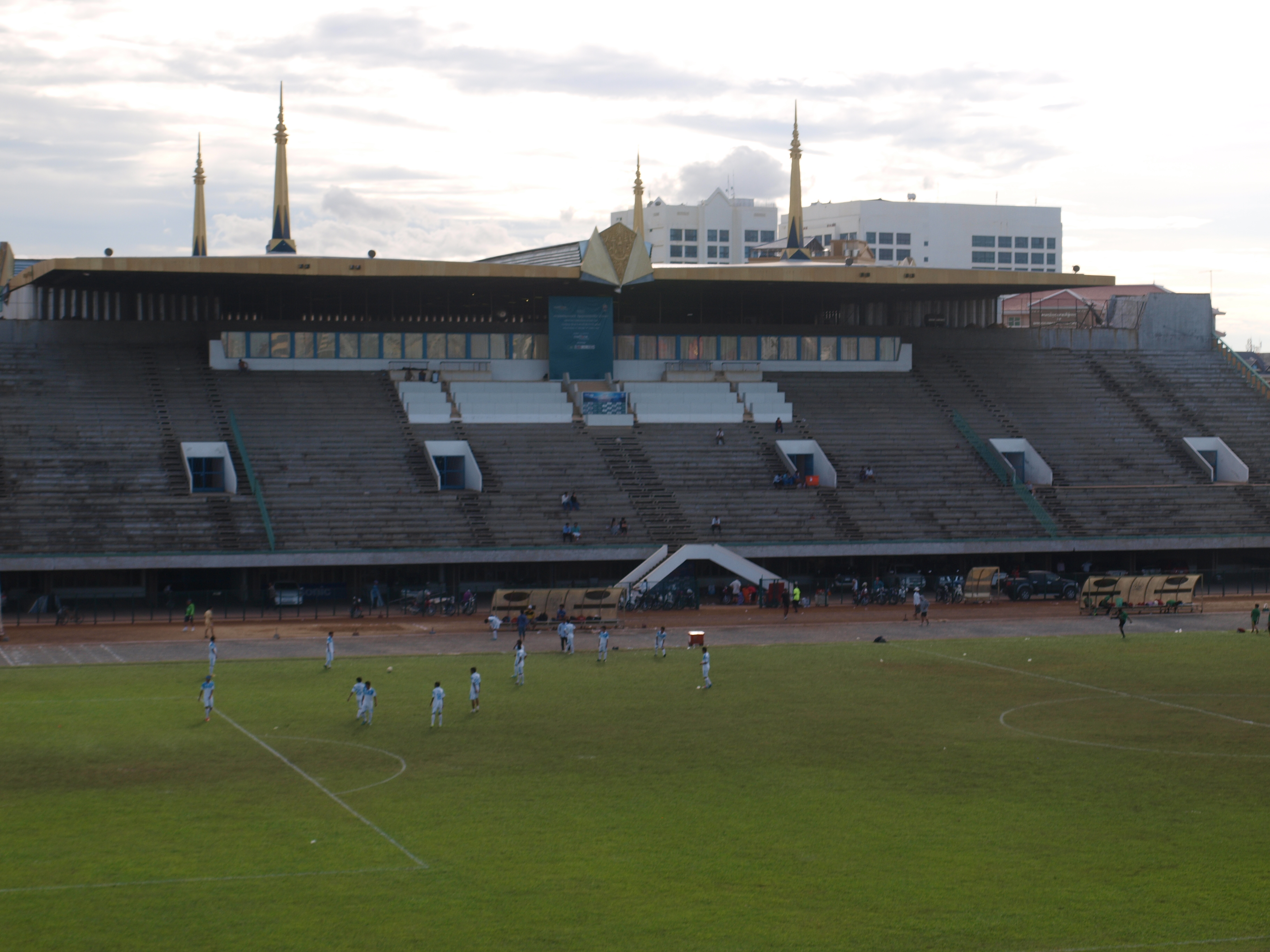

== Results ==
- All times are Indochina Time (ICT) – UTC+7.

Team	Pld	W	D	L	GF	GA	GD	Pts
Laos	4	3	0	1	9	7	+2	9
Cambodia	4	2	1	1	9	8	+1	7
Philippines	4	2	1	1	6	5	+1	7
Brunei	4	1	1	2	8	7	+1	4
Timor-Leste	4	0	1	3	4	9	−5	1

17 October 2008
14:00

Philippines	1 – 0	Timor-Leste
Borromeo 68'	Report

National Olympic Stadium, Phnom Penh
17 October 2008
16:00

Cambodia	3 – 2	Laos
Borey 24'; El Nasa 45'; Sovannarith 55'	Report	Lounglath 30'; Liepvisay 78'

National Olympic Stadium, Phnom Penh
Attendance: 15,000

19 October 2008
14:00

Cambodia	2 – 2	Timor-Leste
Borey 78' (pen.); Sovannarith 80'	Report	Barbosa 45'; J.J. Pereira 67' (pen.)

National Olympic Stadium, Phnom Penh
Attendance: 12,000
19 October 2008
16:00

Brunei	1 – 1	Philippines
Shah Razen 17'	Report	Gould 40'

National Olympic Stadium, Phnom Penh
Referee: Setiyono Midi (Indonesia)

21 October 2008
14:00

Philippines	1 – 2	Laos
Araneta 32'	Report	Lounglath 56' (pen.); Phaphouvanin 59'

National Olympic Stadium, Phnom Penh
21 October 2008
16:00

Timor-Leste	1 – 4	Brunei
Soares 80'	Report	Shah Razen 9', 26'; Azwan 57'; Sallehuddin 76' (pen.)

National Olympic Stadium, Phnom Penh

23 October 2008
14:00

Laos	3 – 2	Brunei
Phaphouvanin 8'; Singto 89'; Phommapanya 90+3'	Report	Hardi 28'; Abu Bakar 84'

National Olympic Stadium, Phnom Penh
23 October 2008
16:00

Cambodia	2 – 3	Philippines
El Nasa 14', 44'	Report	Borromeo 19'; C. Greatwich 36'; Gould 53'

National Olympic Stadium, Phnom Penh
Attendance: 15,000

25 October 2008
14:00

Cambodia	2 – 1	Brunei
El Nasa 45'; Borey 73'	Report	Hardi 44'

National Olympic Stadium, Phnom Penh
Attendance: 15,000
25 October 2008
16:00

Laos	2 – 1	Timor-Leste
Singto 7'; Phaphouvanin 50'	Report	Esteves 44'

National Olympic Stadium, Phnom Penh

== Qualified Teams ==
Teams who finished Top 2 on the group will qualify to the main tournament.

Team	Main tournament standing
Laos	8th
Cambodia	7th

== Goal scorers ==
4 goals

- (Cambodia) Sam El Nasa

3 goals

- (Brunei) Shah Razen
- (Cambodia) Khim Borey
- (Laos) Visay Phaphouvanin

2 goals

- (Brunei) Hardi Bujang
- (Cambodia) Sun Sovannarith
- (Philippines) Alexander Borromeo
- (Philippines) Chad Gould
- (Laos) Phayvanh Lounglath
- (Laos) Lamnao Singto

1 goals

- (Brunei) Azwan Saleh
- (Brunei) Sallehuddin Damit
- (Brunei) Abu Bakar Mahari
- (Laos) Chandalaphone Liepvisay
- (Laos) Saynakhonevieng Phommapanya
- (Philippines) Ian Araneta
- (Philippines) Christopher Greatwich
- (Timor-Leste) Rosito Soares
- (Timor-Leste) José João Pereira
- (Timor-Leste) Anggisu Barbosa
- (Timor-Leste) Alfredo Esteves
