= Sam El Nasa =

Cambodian footballer

Personal information
- Full name: Sam El Nasa
- Date of birth: 25 April 1984 (age 42)
- Place of birth: Phnom Penh, People's Republic of Kampuchea
- Height: 1.74 m (5 ft 8 1/2 in)
- Position: Striker

Senior career*
Years	Team	Apps	(Gls)
2004–2006	Military Police	3	
2006–2011	Preah Khan Reach	12	(13)

International career
2000–2011	Cambodia	46	(11)

Managerial career
- 2012–2013: Svay Rieng FC (assistant coach)
- 2013–: Svay Rieng FC B (assistant coach)
- * Club domestic league appearances and goals

Sam El Nasa (born 25 April 1984 in Cambodia) is a footballer for Preah Khan Reach in Cambodian League. He plays as a striker for club.

== International career ==
=== International goals ===
Scores and results list Cambodia's goal tally first.

No	Date	Venue	Opponent	Score	Result	Competition
1.	16 November 2006	Panaad Park and Stadium, Bacolod, Philippines	Brunei	1–0	1–1	2007 AFF Championship qualification
2.	28 October 2007	Saparmurat Turkmenbashi Olympic Stadium, Ashgabat, Turkmenistan	Turkmenistan	1–0	1–4	2010 FIFA World Cup qualification
3.	17 October 2008	Phnom Penh Olympic Stadium, Phnom Penh, Cambodia	Laos	2–1	3–2	2008 AFF Championship qualification
4.	23 October 2008	Phnom Penh Olympic Stadium, Phnom Penh, Cambodia	Philippines	1–0	2–3	2008 AFF Championship qualification
5.	23 October 2008	Phnom Penh Olympic Stadium, Phnom Penh, Cambodia	Philippines	2–2	2–3	2008 AFF Championship qualification
6.	25 October 2008	Phnom Penh Olympic Stadium, Phnom Penh, Cambodia	Brunei	1–1	2–1	2008 AFF Championship qualification
7.	9 February 2011	Phnom Penh Olympic Stadium, Phnom Penh, Cambodia	Macau	1–0	3–1	2012 AFC Challenge Cup qualification
8.	9 February 2011	Phnom Penh Olympic Stadium, Phnom Penh, Cambodia	Macau	2–0	3–1	2012 AFC Challenge Cup qualification
9.	16 February 2011	Estádio Campo Desportivo, Taipa, Macau	Macau	2–3	2–3 (a.e.t)	2012 AFC Challenge Cup qualification
10.	29 June 2011	Phnom Penh Olympic Stadium, Phnom Penh, Cambodia	Laos	2–1	2–1	2014 FIFA World Cup qualification
11.	29 June 2011	Phnom Penh Olympic Stadium, Phnom Penh, Cambodia	Laos	4–2	2–1	2014 FIFA World Cup qualification
