= Panaad sa Negros Festival =

Annual festival in Bacolod, Philippines

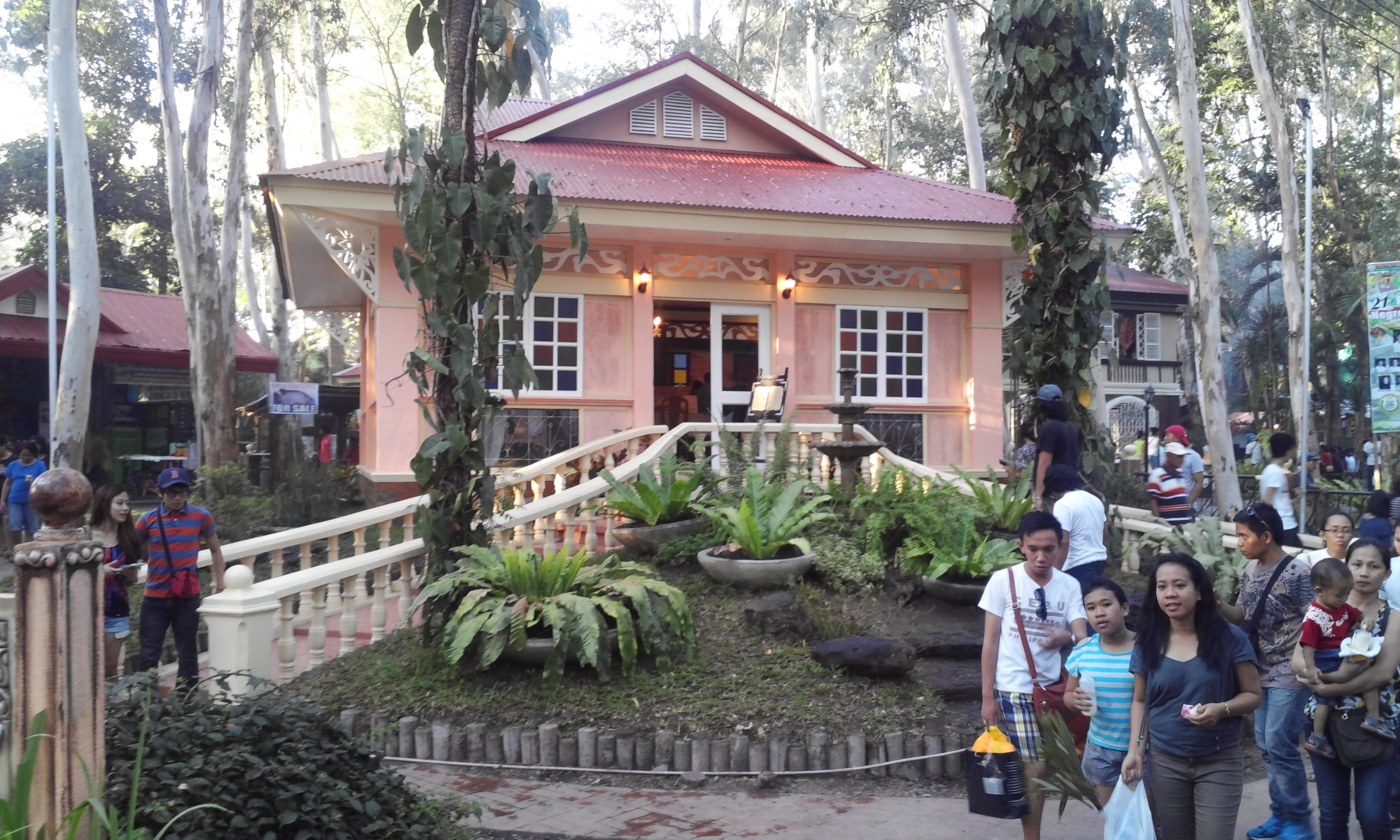
- Genre: Festival and cultural showcase, products and services, featuring tourist attractions
- Dates: April (usually on the first week)
- Locations: Panaad Park and Sports Complex, Bacolod, Philippines
- Years active: 1993 - present
- Website: http://www.panaadsanegros.com/

The Panaad sa Negros Festival, also called simply as the Panaad Festival (sometimes spelled as Pana-ad), is a festival held annually during the month of April in Bacolod, the capital of Negros Occidental province in the Philippines. Panaad is the Hiligaynon word for "vow" or "promise" coming from the root-word saad; the festival is a form of thanksgiving to Divine Providence and commemoration of a vow in exchange for a good life. The celebration is held at the Panaad Park, which also houses the Panaad Stadium, and is participated in by the 13 cities and 19 towns of the province. For this reason, the province dubs it the "mother" of all its festivals.

The first Panaad sa Negros Festival was held at Capitol Park and Lagoon in a three-day affair in 1993 that started April 30. The festival was held at the lagoon fronting the Provincial Capitol for the first four years. As the festival grew each year, it became necessary to locate a more spacious venue. In 1997, the festival was held at the reclaimed area near where the Bredco Port is located today.

The construction of the Panaad Stadium and sports complex paved the way for the establishment of the Panaad Park as the permanent home of the festival.

Governor Eugenio Jose Lacson and Ariel Querubin led the 28th Panaad award-winning “festival of all festivals,” celebration from April 15-21, 2024 at the Panaad Park and Sports Complex at Mansilingan, Bacolod City. With theme “Living the Promise,” it featured the famous Lin-ay sang Negros, San Miguel garden show, MUAD Trade Fair, the 32 local government units themed pavilions and Best of Festival Dances Competition.

== Award ==
In 2017, the Panaad sa Negros Festival made it to the Hall of Fame of the ATOP-DOT Pearl Awards after it was adjudged by the Association of Tourism Officers of the Philippines as its Best Tourism Event in the Provincial Festival Category nationwide for the third consecutive year at the awards night held on October 6, 2017 at the Iloilo Convention Center in Iloilo City.

== See also ==
- MassKara Festival
- Ceres–Negros F.C.
- Lin-ay sang Negros
