= Adélio Guterres =

East Timorese footballer

Personal information
- Full name: Adélio Agapito Maria da Costa Guterres
- Date of birth: 19 December 1987 (age 38)
- Place of birth: East Timor, Indonesia (today East Timor)
- Height: 1.73 m (5 ft 8 in)
- Position: Striker

Senior career*
Years	Team	Apps	(Gls)
2007	Fima Sporting		

International career^{‡}
2005–2007	Timor-Leste	5	(3)
2008–2013	Timor-Leste (futsal)		
- * Club domestic league appearances and goals ‡ National team caps and goals as of 27 October 2013

Adélio Agapito Maria da Costa Guterres (born 19 December 1987) is an East Timorese football player.

== International goals ==
#	Date	Venue	Opponent	Score	Result	Competition
1.	12 November 2006	Panaad Stadium, Bacolod, Philippines	Brunei	1–1	2–3(L)	2007 AFF Championship qualification
2.	16 November 2006	Panaad Stadium, Bacolod, Philippines	Laos	2–2	2–3(L)	2007 AFF Championship qualification
3.	20 November 2006	Panaad Stadium, Bacolod, Philippines	Cambodia	1–2	1–4(L)	2007 AFF Championship qualification
