= Road to Rio (TV program) =

30-minute football show of ABS-CBN

- Created by: ABS-CBN Corporation
- Developed by: ABS-CBN Sports
- Starring: Marielle Benitez; Atom Araullo; Aly Borromeo
- Country of origin: Philippines
- No. of episodes: 16

Production
- Running time: 30 minutes

Original release
- Network: Balls Channel
- Release: February 22 – June 7, 2014

Road to Rio was a 30-minute football show of ABS-CBN. It served as the primer show for the upcoming 2014 FIFA World Cup in Brazil. It was hosted by Marielle Benitez and Alexander Borromeo, members of the Philippine National Football Team for Men and Women and Atom Araullo. It originally aired every Saturdays on Balls Channel with episodes rebroadcast on Sundays on ABS-CBN Sports and Action. Its final episode aired on June 7, 2014, 6 days before the 2014 FIFA World Cup opening day. The network served as the licensed TV broadcasters of the FIFA World Cup in the Philippines.

== Guests ==
- Darren Hartmann
- Armand Del Rosario
- Paulo Buendia

== Background ==
Road to Rio discussed viewers through a history lesson of football’s biggest stage, including notable players and their significant matches and moments.

Benitez, Borromeo and Araullo will give news and updates on the 32 teams that qualified to this year’s World Cup, their rosters, and the match-ups. They will also discuss the basic rules of football and the officials in charge of enforcing those rules on the field.

== See also ==
- Touchline
