= Yaza Win Thein =

Burmese footballer

Personal information
- Full name: Yaza Win Thein
- Date of birth: April 9, 1986 (age 40)
- Place of birth: Yangon, Myanmar
- Height: 1.65 m (5 ft 5 in)
- Position: Midfielder

Senior career*
Years	Team	Apps	(Gls)
2004–2009	Finance and Revenue FC		
2009–2012	Zeyashwemye		
2012–2015	Yangon United		

International career
2007–2014	Myanmar	34	(9)
- * Club domestic league appearances and goals

Yaza Win Thein (born 9 April 1988) is a footballer from Myanmar. He made his first appearance for the Myanmar national football team in 2007.

== Honours ==
=== Club ===
- Myanmar National League(3):2011-2012-2013
- MFF Cup(1): 2012

== International goals ==
No.	Date	Venue	Opponent	Score	Result	Competition
1.	31 July 2008	Hyderabad, India	Nepal	1–0	3–0	2008 AFC Challenge Cup
2.	9 December 2008	Bandung, Indonesia	Cambodia	2–0	3–2	2008 AFF Championship
3.	26 April 2009	Dhaka, Bangladesh	Macau	2–0	4–0	2010 AFC Challenge Cup qualification
4.	30 April 2009	Dhaka, Bangladesh	Cambodia	1–0	1–0	2010 AFC Challenge Cup qualification
