= Teab Vathanak =

Cambodian footballer

Personal information
- Full name: Teab Vathanak
- Date of birth: January 7, 1985 (age 41)
- Place of birth: Cambodia
- Height: 1.72 m (5 ft 7 1/2 in)
- Position: Striker

Senior career*
Years	Team	Apps	(Gls)
2005–2007	Phnom Penh Crown		
2007–2016	Nagaworld		
2016	Boeung Ket Angkor		
2017	Asia Euro United		

International career
2004–2013	Cambodia	15	(4)
- * Club domestic league appearances and goals

Teab Vathanak (born January 7, 1985, in Cambodia) is a Cambodian footballer who plays for Asia Euro United in the Cambodian League.

Although he plays as a midfielder for club he has mainly been used as a striker for the Cambodia national football team, earning 47 caps and scoring 12 goals. Vathanak made 2 appearances in the 2010 FIFA World Cup qualifying rounds.

== Honours ==
=== Club ===
Nagaworld FC

- Cambodian League: 2007, 2009
- Hun Sen Cup: 2013

== International goals ==
#	Date	Venue	Opponent	Score	Result	Competition
1.	May 28, 2009	Dhaka, Bangladesh	Macau	2–1	Won	2010 AFC Challenge Cup qualification
2.	November 14, 2006	Bacolod, Philippines	Laos	2–2	Draw	2007 ASEAN Football Championship qualification
3.	November 20, 2006	Bacolod, Philippines	Timor-Leste	4–1	Won	2007 ASEAN Football Championship qualification
4.	August 25, 2007	New Delhi, India	Syria	1–5	Lose	2007 Nehru Cup
