= Sun Sovannarith =

Cambodian footballer (born 1987)

Personal information
- Full name: Sun Sovannarith
- Date of birth: 11 February 1985 (age 41)
- Place of birth: People's Republic of Kampuchea (in present-day Cambodia)
- Height: 1.79 m (5 ft 10 1/2 in)
- Position: Defender

Senior career*
Years	Team	Apps	(Gls)
2008–2010	Nagacorp		
2010–2011	Phnom Penh Crown		
2012–2016	Nagaworld		
2017–2019	Boeung Ket		
2020	Nagaworld	15	(0)
2021–2023	ISI Dangkor Senchey	17	(0)

International career
200?–2009	Cambodia U-23	?	(0)
2007–2015	Cambodia	33	(2)
- * Club domestic league appearances and goals

Sun Sovannarith (Khmer: ស៊ុន សុវណ្ណរឹទ្ធិ; born 11 February 1985) is a former footballer who last played as a defender for ISI Dangkor Senchey in Cambodian Second League.

He has represented Cambodia at senior international level.

== Honours ==
=== Club ===
Phnom Penh Crown

- Cambodian League:2011
- 2011 AFC President's Cup: Runner up

Nagacorp FC

- Cambodian League: 2009
- Hun Sen Cup: 2013

Boeung Ket FC

- Cambodian League:2017

== International goals ==
#	Date	Venue	Opponent	Score	Result	Competition
1.	October 17, 2008	Olympic Stadium, Phnom Penh	Laos	3–1	3–2	2008 AFF Suzuki Cup qualifier
2.	October 19, 2008	Olympic Stadium, Phnom Penh	Timor-Leste	2–2	2–2	2008 AFF Suzuki Cup qualifier
