= Chan Rithy =

Cambodian footballer

Personal information
- Full name: Chan Rithy
- Date of birth: November 11, 1983 (age 42)
- Place of birth: People's Republic of Kampuchea
- Height: 1.70 m (5 ft 7 in)
- Position: Midfielder

Senior career*
Years	Team	Apps	(Gls)
- Cambodian Army
–2009	Phnom Penh Crown		
2010	Nakhon Pathom F.C.		
2011–2012	Surin FC.		
2012–2014	Boeung Ket Rubber Field		
2014–2017	Cambodian Tiger		

International career
2004–2011	Cambodia	28	(5)
- * Club domestic league appearances and goals

Chan Rithy (born November 11, 1983) is a Cambodian former footballer who last played for Cambodia Tiger in the Cambodian League. He plays as a midfielder for club. He used to play for Cambodia national football team from 2004 to 2011 with 23 caps and 5 goals.

== International goals ==
#	Date	Venue	Opponent	Score	Result	Competition
1.	April 1, 2006	Dhaka, Bangladesh	Bangladesh	1–2	Lost	2006 AFC Challenge Cup
2.	November 20, 2006	Bacolod, Philippines	Timor-Leste	4–1	Won	2007 ASEAN Football Championship qualification
3.	November 20, 2006	Bacolod, Philippines	Timor-Leste	4–1	Won	2007 ASEAN Football Championship qualification
4.	August 19, 2007	New Delhi, India	Kyrgyzstan	3–4	Lost	2007 Nehru Cup
5.	May 28, 2008	Phnom Penh, Cambodia	Macau	3–1	Won	2008 AFC Challenge Cup qualification

== Honours ==
- 2008 Cambodian League Winner
- 2008 Hun Sen Cup Winner
- 2009 Hun Sen Cup Winner
- 2012 Cambodian League Winner
