= Che Chi Man =

Macau footballer

Che Chi Man 謝智民
Personal information
- Date of birth: 7 August 1975 (age 51)
- Place of birth: Macau
- Height: 1.78 m (5 ft 10 in)
- Position: Midfielder

Senior career*
Years	Team	Apps	(Gls)
1996–2013	G.D. Lam Pak		
2015–2017	TKKL		

International career^{‡}
1997–2013	Macau	34	(6)
- * Club domestic league appearances and goals as of 19 March 2021 ‡ National team caps and goals as of 19 March 2021

Che Chi Man (Chinese: 謝智民, born 7 August 1975) is a Macanese former footballer who played as a midfielder for G.D. Lam Pak in the Campeonato da 1ª Divisão do Futebol.
