= 2007 AFF Championship qualification =

Tournament details
- Host country: Philippines
- Dates: 12 – 20 November 2006
- Teams: 5
- Venue: 1 (in 1 host city)

Tournament statistics
- Matches played: 10
- Goals scored: 42 (4.2 per match)
- Top scorer(s): (Philippines) Phil Younghusband (6 goals)

This 2007 AFF Championship qualification was held in Bacolod, Philippines between 12 and 20 November 2006 for the lower-ranked teams in Southeast Asia. All teams play in a round-robin tournament format and the winner and runner-up of the group qualify for the final tournament.

== Venue ==
(Philippines) Bacolod
Panaad Stadium
Capacity: 20,000
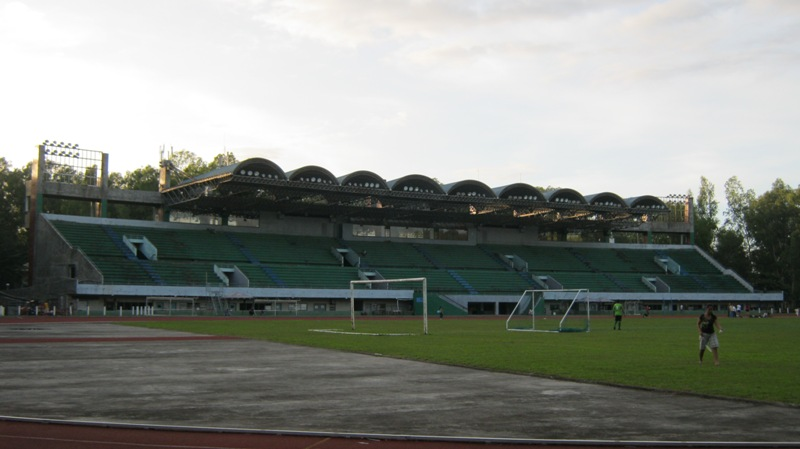

== Qualification ==
- All times are Philippine Standard Time (PST)–UTC+8
- Brunei was represented by 2005–06 Brunei Premier League champions QAF FC.

Team	Pld	W	D	L	GF	GA	GD	Pts
Laos	4	3	1	0	11	6	+5	10
Philippines	4	3	0	1	13	3	+10	9
Cambodia	4	1	2	1	7	5	+2	5
Brunei	4	1	1	2	6	11	−5	4
Timor-Leste	4	0	0	4	5	17	−12	0

12 November 2006
16:30

Philippines	1–2	Laos
C. Greatwich 62'		Sisomephone 47'; Phaphouvanin 49'

Panaad Stadium, Bacolod
12 November 2006
19:00

Timor-Leste	2–3	Brunei
Costa 33'; Belo 77'		Adie Arsham 11', 70'; Mardi 66'

Panaad Stadium, Bacolod

14 November 2006
16:30

Philippines	7–0	Timor-Leste
P. Younghusband 22', 25' (pen.), 36', 69'; C. Greatwich 27'; Zerrudo 51'; Caligdong 82'

Panaad Stadium, Bacolod
14 November 2006
19:00

Cambodia	2–2	Laos
Vathanak 50'; Samchay 75'		Soukhavong 30'; Sisomephone 35'

Panaad Stadium, Bacolod

16 November 2006
16:30

Laos	3–2	Timor-Leste
Saysongkham 34'; Phothilath 61'; Phommapanya 90+2'		Ximenes 82'; Costa 89'

Panaad Stadium, Bacolod
16 November 2006
19:00

Brunei	1–1	Cambodia
Hardi 90'		El Nasa 79'

Panaad Stadium, Bacolod

18 November 2006
16:30

Philippines	1–0	Cambodia
Borromeo 81' (pen.)

Panaad Stadium, Bacolod
18 November 2006
19:00

Brunei	1–4	Laos
Riwandi 20'		Saysongkham 6'; Phaphouvanin 17'; Liepvisay 43'; Phothilath 55'

Panaad Stadium, Bacolod

20 November 2006
16:30

Philippines	4–1	Brunei
Del Rosario 25'; P. Younghusband 59', 90'; Caligdong 73'		Kamarul Ariffin 81'

Panaad Stadium, Bacolod
20 November 2006
19:00

Timor-Leste	1–4	Cambodia
Costa 63'		Samchay 37'; T. Vathanak 58'; C. Rithy 82', 86'

Panaad Stadium, Bacolod

== Qualified Teams ==
Teams who finished Top 2 on the group will qualify to the main tournament.

Team	Main tournament standing
Laos	8th
Philippines	7th

== Goalscorers ==
6 goals

- (Philippines) Phil Younghusband

3 goals

- (Timor-Leste) Adelio Maria Costa

2 goals

- (Brunei) Adie Arsham Salleh
- (Cambodia) Chan Rithy
- (Cambodia) Hem Samchay
- (Cambodia) Teab Vathanak
- (Laos) Visay Phaphouvanin
- (Laos) Vilasock Phothilath
- (Laos) Sounthalay Saysongkham
- (Laos) Sathongyot Sisomephone
- (Philippines) Emelio Caligdong
- (Philippines) Christopher Greatwich

1 goal

- (Brunei) Hardi Bujang
- (Brunei) Mardi Bujang
- (Brunei) Kamarul Ariffin Ramlee
- (Brunei) Riwandi Wahit
- (Cambodia) Sam El Nasa
- (Laos) Chandalaphone Liepvisay
- (Laos) Saynakhonevieng Phommapanya
- (Laos) Kaysone Soukhavong
- (Philippines) Alexander Borromeo
- (Philippines) Anton del Rosario
- (Philippines) Ariel Zerrudo
- (Timor-Leste) Anatacio Belo
- (Timor-Leste) Antonio Ximenes
