= Khim Borey =

Cambodian footballer

Khim Borey ឃឹម បូរី
Personal information
- Full name: Khim Borey
- Date of birth: 29 September 1989 (age 37)
- Place of birth: Takéo, State of Cambodia
- Height: 1.71 m (5 ft 7 1/2 in)
- Positions: Striker; midfielder

Senior career*
| Years | Team | Apps | (Gls) |
| 2007 | Cambodian Army | | |
| 2008–2010 | National Defense Ministry | 57 | (44) |
| 2010–2015 | Phnom Penh Crown | 29 | (6) |
| 2011 | → Sisaket (loan) | 46 | (29) |
| 2015–2021 | Nagaworld | 84 | (15) |

International career^{‡}
| 2007–2015 | Cambodia | 30 | (11) |

Managerial career
- 2022–: Nagaworld
- 2025–2026: Cambodia (assistant)
- 2025–2026: Cambodia U-23 (assistant)
- * Club domestic league appearances and goals ‡ National team caps and goals as of January 19, 2015

Khim Borey (Khmer: ឃឹម បូរី; born 29 September 1989) is a Cambodian football coach and former football player. He is currently head coach of Cambodian Premier League club Nagaworld.

== International goals ==
| # | Date | Venue | Opponent | Score | Result | Competition |
|---|---|---|---|---|---|---|
| 1. | August 25, 2008 | Gelora Bung Karno Stadium, Jakarta | Myanmar | 1–1 | 1–7 | 2008 Indonesia Independence Cup |
| 2. | October 17, 2008 | Olympic Stadium, Phnom Penh | Laos | 1–0 | 3–2 | 2008 AFF Suzuki Cup qualifier |
| 3. | October 19, 2008 | Olympic Stadium, Phnom Penh | Timor-Leste | 1–2 | 2–2 | 2008 AFF Suzuki Cup qualifier |
| 4. | October 25, 2008 | Olympic Stadium, Phnom Penh | Brunei | 2–1 | 2–1 | 2008 AFF Suzuki Cup qualifier |
| 5. | December 9, 2008 | Jalak Harupat Stadium, Bandung | Myanmar | 2–2 | 2–3 | 2008 AFF Suzuki Cup |
| 6. | October 24, 2010 | New Laos National Stadium, Vientiane | Timor-Leste | 1–1 | 4–2 | 2010 AFF Suzuki Cup qualifier |
| 7. | October 24, 2010 | New Laos National Stadium, Vientiane | Timor-Leste | 2–1 | 4–2 | 2010 AFF Suzuki Cup qualifier |
| 8. | October 24, 2010 | New Laos National Stadium, Vientiane | Timor-Leste | 3–1 | 4–2 | 2010 AFF Suzuki Cup qualifier |
| 9. | February 16, 2011 | Estádio Campo Desportivo, Macau | Macau | 2–3 | 2–3 | 2012 AFC Challenge Cup qualifier |
| 10. | October 9, 2012 | Thuwunna Stadium, Yangon | Brunei | 2–3 | 2–3 | 2012 AFF Suzuki Cup qualifier |
| 11. | June 5, 2015 | King Rama 9 Commemoration Sports Stadium, Nonthaburi | Myanmar | 1–0 | 1–0 | Friendly Match |

== Honours ==
=== Club ===
National Defense Ministry

- Hun Sen Cup: 2010

Phnom Penh Crown

- 2011 AFC President's Cup: Runner up
- Cambodian League: 2014

Nagaworld

- Cambodian League: 2018

=== Individual ===
- Cambodian League Golden Boot: 2008
