= Aly Borromeo =

Filipino footballer (born 1983)

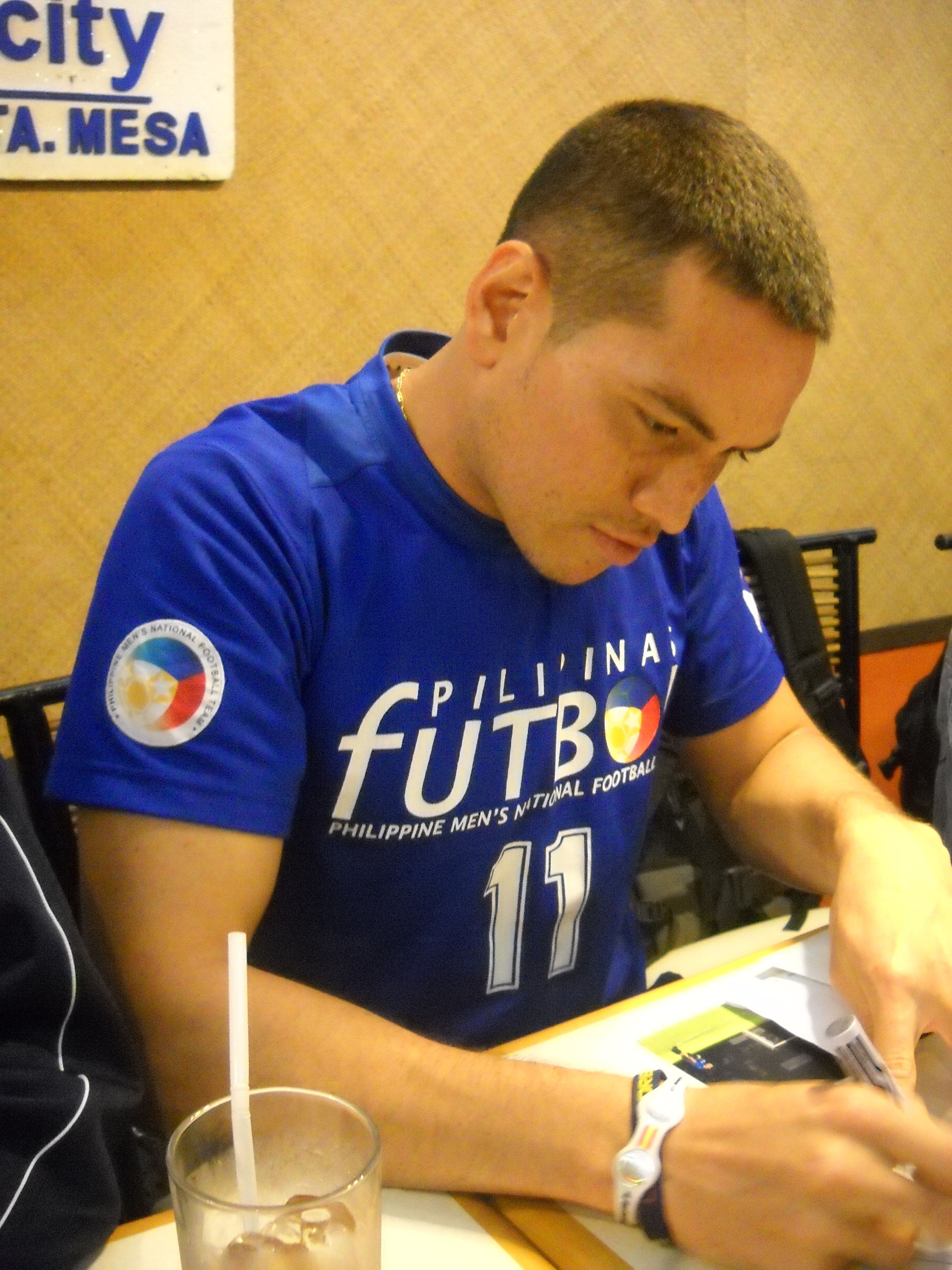
- Borromeo in 2011

Personal information
- Full name: Alexander Charles Luis Borromeo
- Date of birth: 28 June 1983 (age 43)
- Place of birth: San Francisco, California, U.S.
- Height: 1.88 m (6 ft 2 in)
- Position: Defender

Youth career
- 1999–2003: Kaya

Senior career*
Years	Team	Apps	(Gls)
2003–2018	Kaya		
2010–2011	→ Global (loan)		

International career^{‡}
2000	Philippines U19	4	(0)
2005	Philippines U23	8	(0)
2004–2011	Philippines	42	(4)
- * Club domestic league appearances and goals as of May 1, 2014 ‡ National team caps and goals as of May 1, 2014

Alexander Charles Luis Borromeo (born June 28, 1983) is a former professional footballer who played as a defender. Born in the United States, he played for the Philippines national team.

== Club career ==
Borromeo joined Kaya in 1999, and has been the captain of the first team for several years during his tenure. He went on a loan to Global during the 2010–11 season and led the club to be the champions of the 2010 UFL Cup during that season.

On October 15, 2011, in his first match for Kaya in the 2011 UFL Cup against Diliman, Borromeo incurred an ACL injury, which sidelined him for the club and the national team. After almost seven months, he made his return for the 2012 League season on May 12, 2012, as a substitute against Loyola Meralco Sparks, which ended a 2–2 draw. In the following match against Global F.C. on May 16, 2012, he scored an equalizer in second half injury time to end in a 1–1 draw.

He was dropped from the Kaya lineup for the 2012–13 season due to a meniscus injury, in which he acquired while training for the national team in mid-2012.

Borromeo's recurring injury since 2011 made him consider retirement but eventually recovered to return playing with Kaya. He played for Kaya at the 2016 AFC Cup and was a starter and captain for the team's first match against Kitchee from Hong Kong. He was still playing for Kaya when the club joined the Philippines Football League in 2017 as Kaya–Makati (and later as Kaya–Iloilo). His return stint to Kaya as a player was brief but he remained with the club after he was appointed as its team manager.

== International career ==
Borromeo first represented the Philippines at under-19 level during the 2000 AFC Youth Championship qualifiers and was also a goalkeeper at that time. Four years later, he made his full international debut at the 2004 Tiger Cup, playing in all four matches. Playing as a striker, he assisted two goals by Emelio Caligdong to give the Philippines their first ever win in the competition, defeating newly independent Timor-Leste 2–1.

He also represented the Philippines at under-23 level. At the 2005 Southeast Asian Games on home soil, serving as captain, he scored in a 4–2 win against Cambodia as the Philippines failed to progress to the knockout stage.

== International goals ==
No.	Date	Venue	Opponent	Score	Result	Competition
1.	18 November 2006	Bacolod, Philippines	Cambodia	1–0	1–0	2007 AFF Championship qualification
2.	17 October 2008	Phnom Penh, Cambodia	Timor-Leste	1–0	1–0	2008 AFF Championship qualification
3.	23 October 2008	Phnom Penh, Cambodia	Cambodia	1–1	3–2	2008 AFF Championship qualification
4.	16 April 2009	Malé, Maldives	Maldives	1–0	2–3	2010 AFC Challenge Cup qualification

== Personal ==
Borromeo is the biological son of prominent Australian businessman Marcus Blackmore. He did not meet his father until he was 27. One of his step-sisters is fashion designer Imogen Merrony. KC Concepcion had been in a relation with ex-boyfriend Borromeo from 2017 to 2018. However, she reunited with him in October 2024.

== See also ==
- Road To Rio
