= Hardi Bujang =

Bruneian footballer (born 1984)

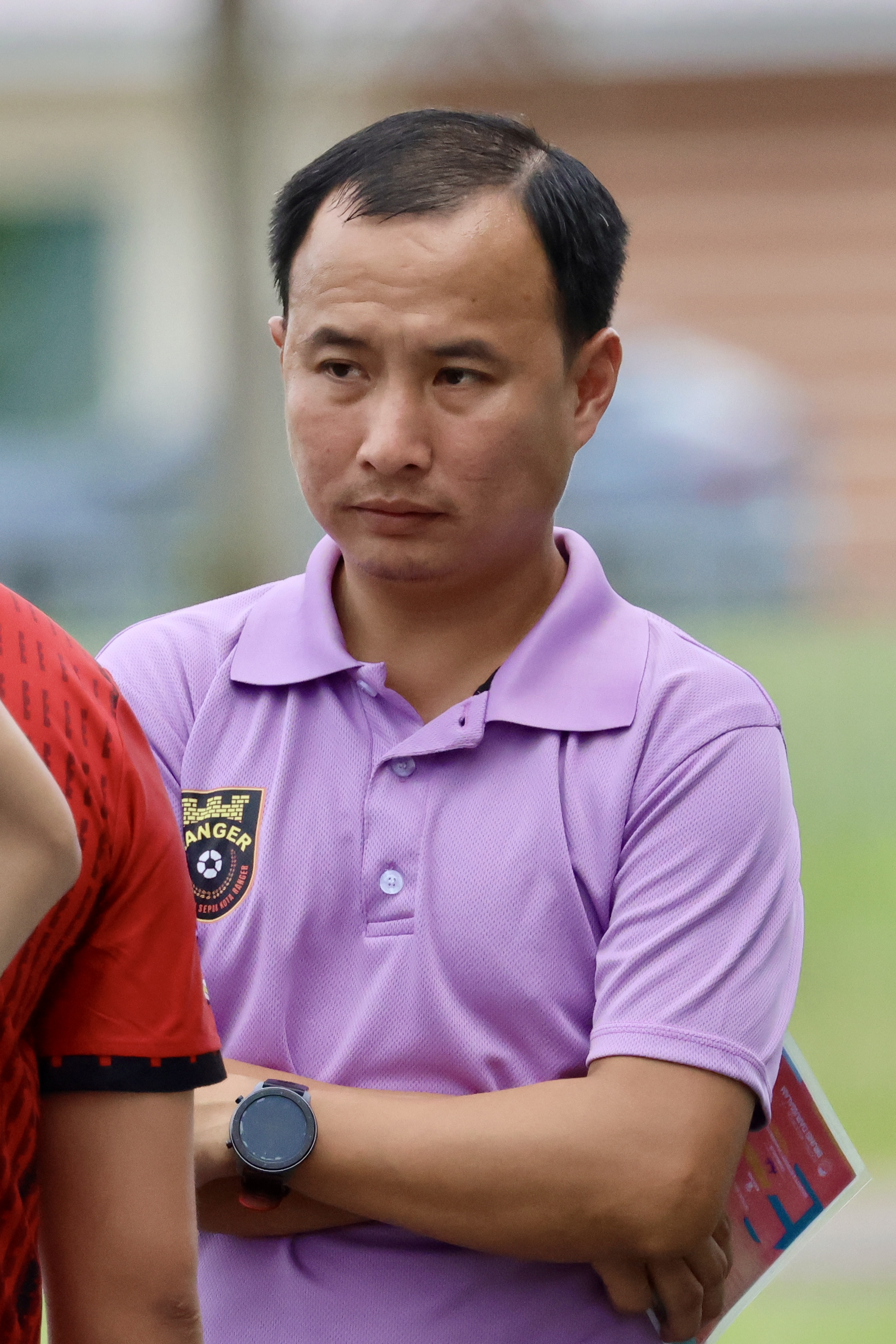
- Hardi with Kota Ranger in 2024

Personal information
- Full name: Hardi Bujang
- Date of birth: 19 October 1984 (age 42)
- Place of birth: Seria, Brunei
- Position: Midfielder

Senior career*
Years	Team	Apps	(Gls)
2003–2006	QAF		
2006–2009	DPMM		(2)
2009–2014	QAF		(6+)
2015–2016	Jerudong		(18)
2016	Indera		(1)
2017–2019	Kota Ranger		(7)
2020	DPMM II	0	(0)
2021–2022	Kota Ranger		(2)

International career^{‡}
2005	Brunei U21		
2006–2008	Brunei	11	(3)
- * Club domestic league appearances and goals as of 15 April 2023 ‡ National team caps and goals as of 9 June 2017

Hardi Bujang (born 19 October 1984) is a Bruneian former footballer and current coach who played as a midfielder. He played for the Brunei national football team between 2006 and 2008, gaining 11 caps and scoring three goals for the Wasps.

== Club career ==
Hardi previously played for QAF FC from 2003 until 2015, when he joined Jerudong FC after QAF waived entry to the 2015 Brunei Super League. Between 2006 and 2009, he was a member of Brunei's sole professional team DPMM FC which played in Malaysia and then Singapore, but still turned out for QAF FC domestically. He scored 18 goals for the Jerudong club to finish the 2015 season as the league's top scorer.

Hardi moved to Indera SC at the start of the 2016 season as a replacement for Nur Ikhwan Othman who had transferred to DPMM FC. On 8 April, he was found guilty by the NFABD of violent conduct in the match against Kasuka FC on 27 March which was abandoned after tempers frayed between the players and match officials during an incident in the 43rd minute. He was fined BND$500 and given a two-match suspension which would be doubled if he fails to pay the fine.

Hardi moved to Kota Ranger FC for the 2017 Brunei Super League season. He scored his first goal for the Rangers on 28 July against his former team Indera. He was able to win the Brunei FA Cup in the 2018-19 season.

== International career ==
Hardi debuted for the Brunei national football team on 2 April 2006 against Sri Lanka in a 0–1 defeat, as his club QAF was representing Brunei at the 2006 AFC Challenge Cup. In 2008, he turned out for Brunei again as a DPMM FC player for the AFF Suzuki Cup qualifying and scored two goals.

Previously, Hardi was with the Brunei Under-21s at the 2005 Hassanal Bolkiah Trophy.

== International goals ==
Goal	Date	Venue	Opponent	Score	Result	Competition
1.	16 November 2006	Panaad Stadium, Bacolod, Philippines	Cambodia	1–1	1–1	2007 AFF Championship qualification
2.	23 October 2008	National Olympic Stadium, Phnom Penh, Cambodia	Laos	1–1	2–3	2008 AFF Suzuki Cup qualification
3.	25 October 2008	National Olympic Stadium, Phnom Penh, Cambodia	Cambodia	1–0	1–2	2008 AFF Suzuki Cup qualification

== Honours ==
=== Club ===
QAF FC

- Brunei Premier League (3): 2005–06, 2007–08, 2009–10
- Brunei League Cup (2): 2007–08, 2009

DPMM FC

- Singapore League Cup: 2009

Kota Ranger FC

- Brunei FA Cup: 2018–19

=== Individual ===
- Brunei Premier League Best Young Player of the Year: 2005–06
- Brunei Super League top scorer: 2015

== Personal life ==
Hardi's twin brother Mardi is also a Bruneian footballer. Both of them have played together at QAF FC, DPMM FC, Jerudong FC and the national team. Having both on the field has caused trouble and confusion to referees on one occasion at least.
