= Hok Sochetra =

Cambodian football manager (born 1974)

Personal information
- Date of birth: 27 July 1974 (age 52)
- Place of birth: Phnom Penh, Khmer Republic
- Height: 1.80 m (5 ft 11 in)
- Position: Striker

Senior career*
Years	Team	Apps	(Gls)
2002–2004	Samart United		
2005–2006	Hello United		
2007	Phnom Penh Empire		
2008–2013	Preah Khan Reach		

International career^{‡}
1995–2003	Cambodia	26	(20)

Managerial career
- Post Tel Club
- 2012: Cambodia
- 2017–: Visakha (team manager)
Khmer name
Khmer	ហុក សុចិត្រា
Romanization	Hŏk Sŏcĕtra
IPA	hok so.cə.traː
- * Club domestic league appearances and goals ‡ National team caps and goals as of 2 December 2013

Hok Sochetra (Khmer: ហុក សុចិត្រា; born 27 July 1974) is a former Cambodian footballer and current manager. Playing for the national team from 1995 to 2003, he is the joint top goalscorer alongside Chan Vathanaka. Sochetra is considered one of the greatest Cambodian footballers of all time.

== International goals ==
Scores and results list Cambodia's goal tally first, score column indicates score after each Cambodia goal.

List of international goals scored by Hok Sochetra
No.	Date	Venue	Opponent	Score	Result	Competition
1	27 April 1997	Phnom Penh Olympic Stadium, Phnom Penh, Cambodia	Indonesia	1–0	1–1	1998 FIFA World Cup qualification
2	29 June 1997	Phnom Penh Olympic Stadium, Phnom Penh, Cambodia	Uzbekistan	1–1	1–4	1998 FIFA World Cup qualification
3	5 October 1997	Lebak Bulus Stadium, Jakarta, Indonesia	Brunei		4–0	1997 Southeast Asian Games
4	5 October 1997	Lebak Bulus Stadium, Jakarta, Indonesia	Brunei		4–0	1997 Southeast Asian Games
5	9 October 1997	Lebak Bulus Stadium, Jakarta, Indonesia	Singapore		1–2	1997 Southeast Asian Games
6	14 October 1997	Lebak Bulus Stadium, Jakarta, Indonesia	Myanmar		3–1	1997 Southeast Asian Games
7	14 October 1997	Lebak Bulus Stadium, Jakarta, Indonesia	Myanmar		3–1	1997 Southeast Asian Games
8	2 December 1998	Surat Thani Province Stadium, Surat Thani, Thailand	China		1–4	1998 Asian Games
9	2 August 1999	Berakas Sports Complex, Bandar Seri Begawan, Brunei	Brunei	2–3	3–3	1999 Southeast Asian Games
10	2 August 1999	Berakas Sports Complex, Bandar Seri Begawan, Brunei	Brunei	3–3	3–3	1999 Southeast Asian Games
11	4 August 1999	Berakas Sports Complex, Bandar Seri Begawan, Brunei	Malaysia	1–1	2–7	1999 Southeast Asian Games
12	18 October 1999	Mong Kok Stadium, Hong Kong	Hong Kong	1–1	1–4	2000 AFC Asian Cup qualification
13	20 November 1999	Gelora Bung Karno Stadium, Jakarta, Indonesia	Indonesia	1–1	2–9	2000 AFC Asian Cup qualification
14	20 November 1999	Gelora Bung Karno Stadium, Jakarta, Indonesia	Indonesia	2–6	2–9	2000 AFC Asian Cup qualification
15	9 November 2000	Tinsulanon Stadium, Songkhla, Thailand	Malaysia	2–3	2–3	2000 AFF Championship
16	11 November 2000	Tinsulanon Stadium, Songkhla, Thailand	Laos	1–0	3–0	2000 AFF Championship
17	11 November 2000	Tinsulanon Stadium, Songkhla, Thailand	Laos	3–0	3–0	2000 AFF Championship
18	15 December 2002	Gelora Bung Karno Stadium, Jakarta, Indonesia	Vietnam	1–3	2–9	2002 AFF Championship
19	17 December 2002	Gelora Bung Karno Stadium, Jakarta, Indonesia	Indonesia	1–0	2–4	2002 AFF Championship
20	17 December 2002	Gelora Bung Karno Stadium, Jakarta, Indonesia	Indonesia	2–1	2–4	2002 AFF Championship

== Coaching career ==
From July to October 2012, Sochetra coached the Cambodia national football team, but resigned after four defeats in the 2012 AFF Championship qualification phase.

== Personal life ==
Both Sochetra's son, Kim Titsovathanak and father, Hok Chheang Kim are Bokator fighters. Titsovathanak is a SEA Games gold medalist.
