= Panaad Park and Sports Complex =

Sports and recreational park in Bacolod, Philippines

- Panaad Park and Stadium, Panaad Sports and Recreational Park
- Silay Pavilion at the Panaad Park, 2014.
- Full name: Panaad Park and Sports Complex
- Location: Bacolod, Negros Occidental, Philippines
- Main venue: Panaad Stadium
- Facilities: Panaad Swimming Complex, Softball Diamond

Construction
- Opened: 1998
- Type: Urban park
- Area: 0.25 km^{2} (0.097 mi^{2})
- Created: 1998
- Plants: 60,000 eucalyptus trees

The Panaad Park and Sports Complex(Tagalog: [pɐˈnaʔad], sometimes spelled Pana-ad), also known as the Panaad Park and Stadium or the Panaad Sports and Recreational Park, is a sports and recreational park in Bacolod, Negros Occidental, Philippines owned by the Provincial Government of Negros Occidental. It also hosts a sports complex with a stadium. The park is known as the main venue of the Panaad Festival since its establishment in the late 1990s.

== History ==
The park was established following the completion of a sports complex built for the hosting of the 1998 Palarong Pambansa, which includes the Panaad Stadium in Barangay Mansilingan of Bacolod. The sports complex was initially known as the Negros Occidental Sports and Recreational Center.

The area was then made as the primary venue of the Panaad Festival which was previously held at the Capitol Park and Lagoon from 1993 to 1996, and at Bredco Port in 1997.

== Sports complex ==
Panaad Park hosts a sports complex with the Panaad Stadium as its main stadium. The sports complex also has a swimming pool complex with an Olympic-size swimming pool and a second pool for training purposes. It also hosts a softball diamond.

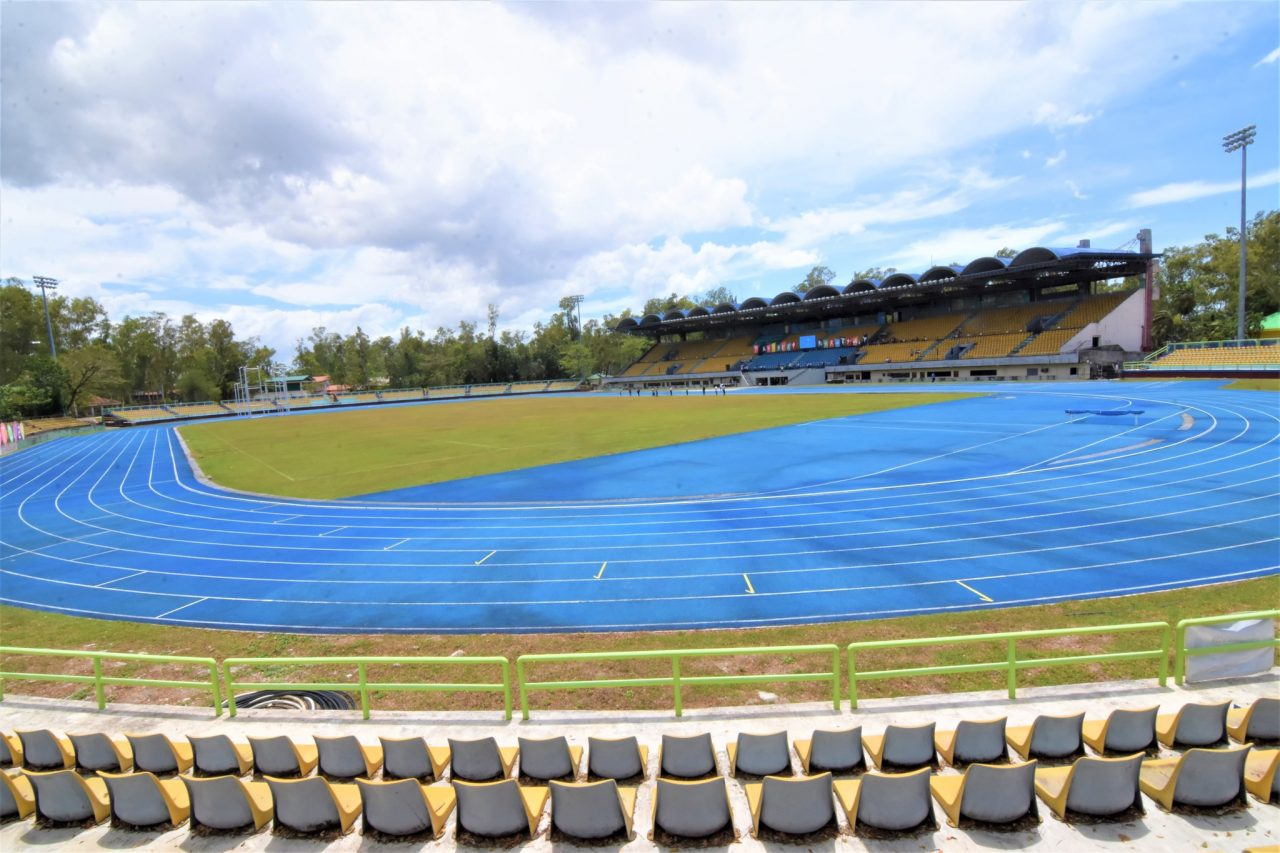
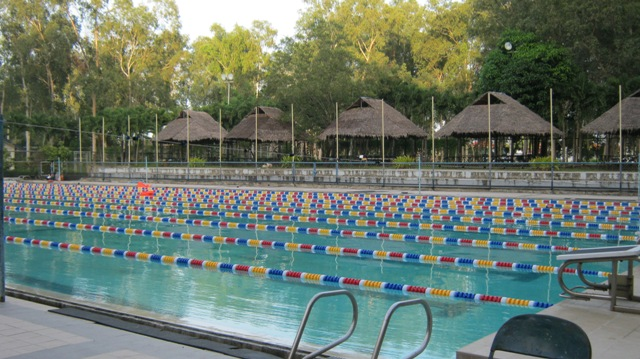
The Panaad Stadium (left) and the Panaad Swimming Complex (right)

== Flora ==
Eucalyptus is the primary type of tree which populates the park. It is estimated that there are 60,000 individual eucalyptus trees in the 25 hectares (62 acres) park.

== Other facilities ==
Talisay Pavilion. Panaad Festival 2014.

The venue has been the permanent venue of the Panaad Festival and hosts 32 pavilions which features the 32 towns and cities of Negros Occidental. The park hosts the extension office of Western Visayas chapter of the Maritime Industry Authority in a four-storey building inaugurated within the park in 2018. The 25-hectare Panaad Sports Complex, lined with eucalyptus trees and the 32 attractive pavilions for each local government unit. Each pavilion features the history, commerce, tourism, trade products and services, arts and culture, and food of the particular town or city.

The unfinished Negros First Animal Hub, a venue meant for trade of livestock and poultry and related-research and development to boost the agriculture of the province is also hosted inside the park. The center was left incomplete due to alleged anomalies in the bidding process.
