= Ivan Yusoff =

Malaysian footballer

Personal information
- Full name: Mohd Ivan Bin Mohd Yusoff
- Date of birth: 13 May 1982 (age 44)
- Place of birth: Kuala Lumpur, Malaysia
- Height: 1.67 m (5 ft 5 1/2 in)

Team information
- Current team: PT Athletic F.C. (assistant coach)

Senior career*
Years	Team	Apps	(Gls)
2003–2004	Kuala Lumpur	30	(3)
2005–2006	Perlis	21	(2)
2006–2008	Kuala Lumpur	40	(5)
2009–2010	Sabah	7	(0)
2011	Shahzan Muda	0	(0)

International career
2004–2007	Malaysia	10	(1)
- * Club domestic league appearances and goals

Mohd Ivan Bin Mohd Yusoff (born 13 May 1982) is a former Malaysian international footballer. He played as a midfielder for the Malaysia national team, Kuala Lumpur, Perlis, Sabah and Shahzan Muda.

== Club career ==
Born in Kuala Lumpur, Malaysia, Ivan started his career with his hometown side Kuala Lumpur in 2003. In 2005, Ivan left Kuala Lumpur for Perlis side and helped his team to win their first Malaysia Super League title in 2005. He returned to Kuala Lumpur in 2006 and played for two seasons, before switching to PKNS FC in 2009.

He played with Malaysia FAM Cup outfit Shahzan Muda FC for the 2011 season.

== International career ==
Ivan made his international debut during a 2006 FIFA World Cup qualification (AFC) match against Hong Kong on 13 October 2008. He also represented Malaysia in the 2004 Tiger Cup mostly appearing as a substitute.

His first international goals came in the match against Cambodia as Malaysia thrashed Cambodia 6–0. He was also included in the squad for the 2007 AFC Asian Cup and played only one match, against Uzbekistan.
