= Al-Idrus FC =

- Founded: 2011
- Manager: Ak Kanzul Shah Pg Hj Damit
- Coach: Jabidi Johari
- 2016: 2016 Brunei Premier League, 1st (promoted)

Al-Idrus Football Club is a football club based in Bandar Seri Begawan, Brunei Darussalam. The youth department Al-Idrus Junior won the Brunei Premier League in 2016.

== Honours ==
Al Idrus

- Unida CF Trophy: 2016
- Al-Idrus FA Cup: 2019

Al-Idrus Junior

- NFABD TelBru Youth Under-16 National Football League: 2013
- NBT FA Cup: 2014 (runners-up)
- Brunei-Muara District Football League: 2015
- Brunei Premier League: 2016

Al-Idrus FC (veteran)

- Brunei Veteran Football Association FA Cup: 2014, 2015 (runners-up), 2018
- Brunei Veteran Football Association President's Cup: 2016 (runners-up), 2018
- Brunei Veteran Football Association Super Cup: 2017
