= Panaad Stadium =

Multi-purpose stadium in Bacolod, Philippines

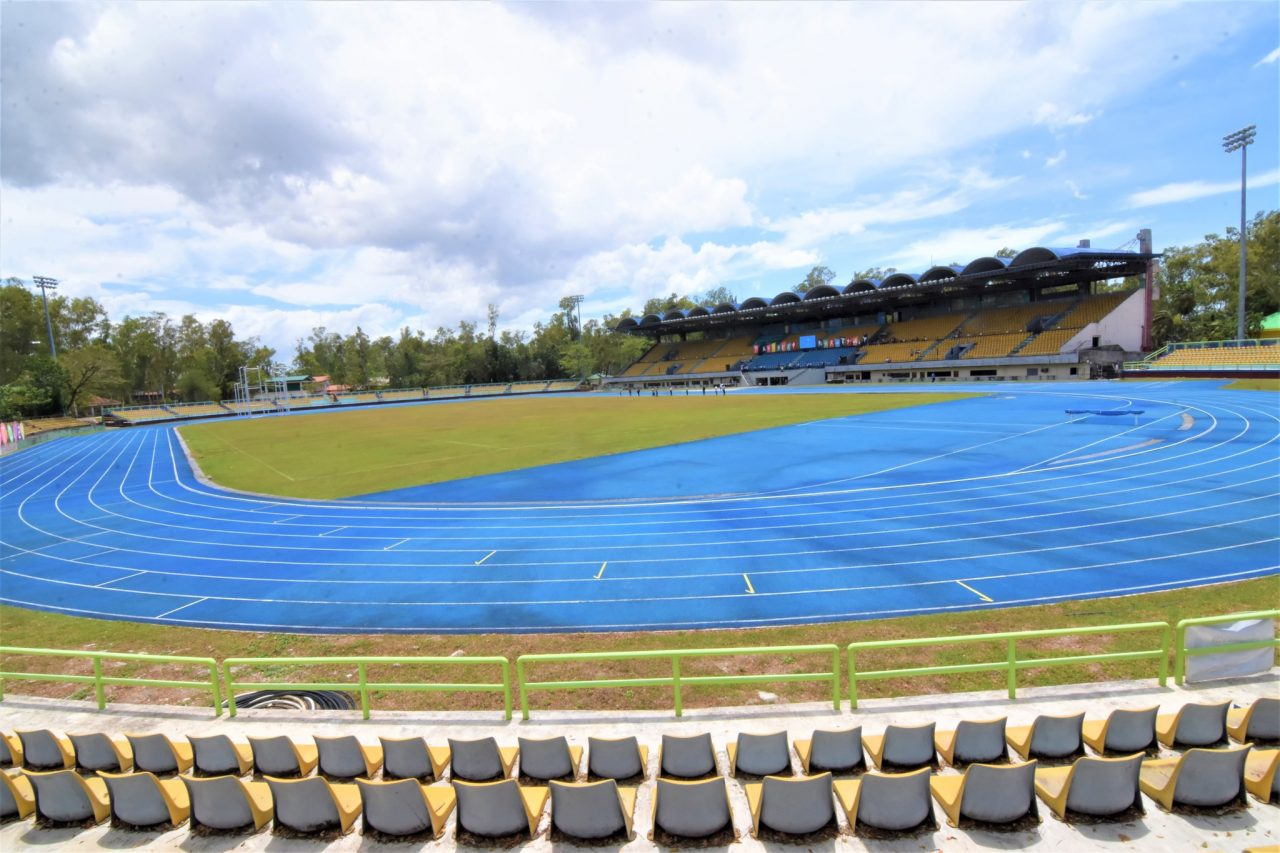
- The Panaad Stadium in 2023
- Interactive map of Panaad Stadium
- Full name: Panaad Stadium
- Former names: Negros Occidental Sports Stadium
- Location: Bacolod, Philippines
- Coordinates: 10.624926°N 122.965465°E
- Owner: Negros Occidental Provincial Government
- Capacity: 10,500
- Surface: Carabao grass
- Scoreboard: Yes
- Record attendance: 20,000 (Philippines vs Mongolia, February 9, 2011)
- Field size: 111 × 71 m (121.4 x 77.6 yd)

Construction
- Built: August 1997 to April 1998
- Renovated: 2007, 2010, 2011, 2020
- Closed: 2020
- Reopened: March 21, 2023
- Architect: United Architects of the Philippines

Tenants
- Ceres–Negros F.C. (2015–2020); Philippines national football team (selected matches)

The Panaad Stadium (Tagalog: [pɐˈnaʔad]), also sometimes spelled as Pana-ad, named after the park where the stadium is situated in, is a multi-purpose stadium in Barangay Mansilingan, Bacolod, Philippines.

Panaad hosted various international sporting events particularly football when Bacolod co-hosted the 2005 Southeast Asian Games and the 2012 AFC Challenge Cup qualification against Mongolia. The stadium was a former home to Ceres-Negros F.C.

== History ==
The construction of Panaad started in August 1997 during the term of Gov. Lito Coscolluela. It was finished in April 1998 and opened the following month to host the Centennial Palarong Pambansa. The stadium however hosted the final playoffs of the 1998 President's Centennial Cup on March 14 and 15, 1998.

Aside from the football field, the stadium features a rubberized track. After the construction of the stadium, the Panaad Stadium and the surrounding area was made part of a park which became the permanent main venue of the Panaad sa Negros Festival.

== Renovation ==
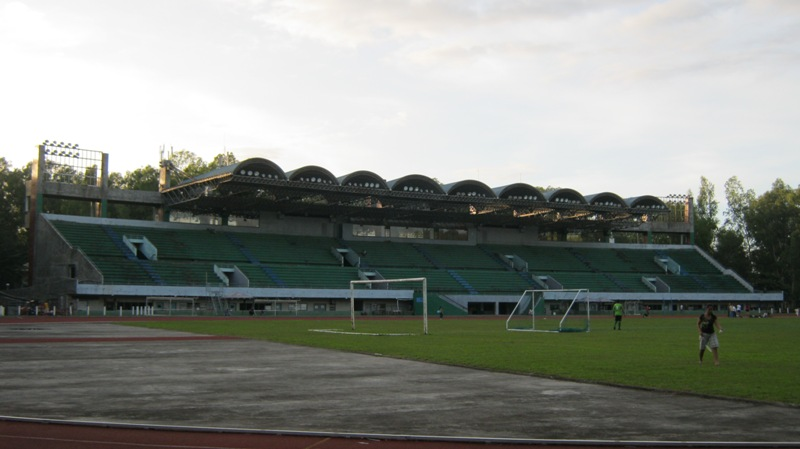
Grandstand in 2010.

In 2007, the Provincial Government has earmarked P2.2 million for the repair of the oval, which has played host to two National Palaro meets, the now-defunct national Batang Pinoy meet, and many school-based athletic events since it opened in May 1998.

The decade-old stadium was considered to host the semifinal matches of the 2010 AFF Suzuki Cup between the Philippines and Indonesia, but was disqualified for not satisfying the standards of the ASEAN Football Federation.

Despite the minor improvements, Panaad hosted a match between the Philippines national football team and Mongolia in the 2012 AFC Challenge Cup qualification on February 9, 2011 with an attendance of 20,000 people, filling the grandstand, bleachers, and standing room areas.

In early 2016, it was reported that the provincial government of Negros Occidental is planning to increase the seating capacity of the Panaad Stadium in Bacolod if it wins its bid for the hosting of the 2017 Palarong Pambansa. This is in line with the recent FIFA and AFC stadium requirement of at least 30,000 seats in order to host an international football tournament. The Negros Occidental chapter of the United Architects Association of the Philippines has made an initial survey and came up with a P200 million (USD4.5 million) budget to refurbish Panaad. A PHP200 million (USD4.5 million) budget could build another roofed grandstand on the opposite side of the field and seats behind the two goals to increase the capacity to 32,000.

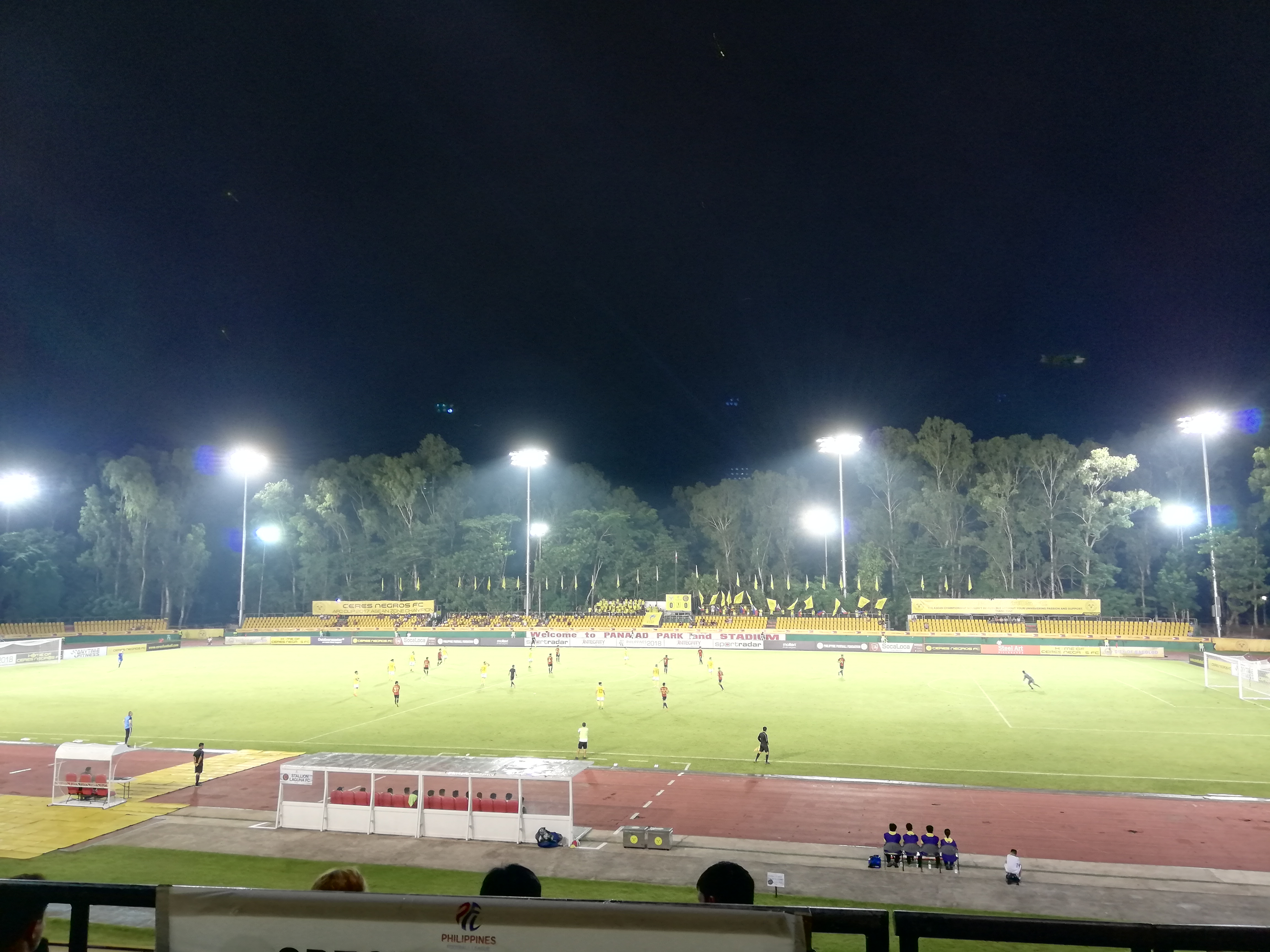
A Ceres–Negros game in 2018

The stadium was refurbished for the hosting of the home matches of Ceres Negros at the 2016 AFC Cup. Fiber glass seats on the main grandstand for VIPs and the media tribune were installed. Media venues within the sports venue were also renovated particularly the press box, VIP rooms, press conference room, and the media working room. A VIP lounge and a new air conditioning system were also installed. By February 2016, the Negros Occidental Football Association were improving the floodlight illumination of the stadium.

In preparation for Negros Occidental's hosting of the 2021 Palarong Pambansa, the stadium was closed in January 2020 for the renovation. Works continued despite the COVID-19 pandemic. The national games to be hosted in the province were postponed to 2023. The Panaad Stadium was inaugurated on March 30, 2023.

== Notable events at the Panaad Stadium ==
=== Sports events ===
- 1999 AFC Women's Championship
- 2005 Southeast Asian Games
- 2007 AFF Championship qualification
- 2012 AFC Challenge Cup qualification
- 2013 Philippine Peace Cup
- 2014 AFC Presidents Cup
- 2016 AFC Cup
- 2017 AFC Cup
- 2017 Philippines Football League
- 2018 AFC Cup
- 2018 Philippines Football League
- 2018 AFF Championship
- 2019 AFC Asian Cup qualification – third round
- 2019 AFC Champions League qualifying play-offs
- 2019 AFC Cup
- 2020 AFC Cup
- 2022 FIFA World Cup qualification – AFC second round

=== Other ===
- Panaad Festival (annually since 1998)

== International football matches ==
| Date | Competition | Team 1 | Res. | Team 2 | Attendance |
|---|---|---|---|---|---|
| 12 November 2006 | 2007 AFF Championship qualification | Philippines | 1–2 | Laos | |
| 12 November 2006 | 2007 AFF Championship qualification | Timor-Leste | 2–3 | Brunei | |
| 14 November 2006 | 2007 AFF Championship qualification | Philippines | 7–0 | Timor-Leste | |
| 14 November 2006 | 2007 AFF Championship qualification | Cambodia | 2–2 | Laos | |
| 16 November 2006 | 2007 AFF Championship qualification | Laos | 3–2 | Timor-Leste | |
| 16 November 2006 | 2007 AFF Championship qualification | Brunei | 1–1 | Cambodia | |
| 18 November 2006 | 2007 AFF Championship qualification | Philippines | 1–0 | Cambodia | |
| 18 November 2006 | 2007 AFF Championship qualification | Brunei | 1–4 | Laos | |
| 20 November 2006 | 2007 AFF Championship qualification | Philippines | 4–1 | Brunei | |
| 20 November 2006 | 2007 AFF Championship qualification | Timor-Leste | 1–4 | Cambodia | |
| 9 February 2011 | 2012 AFC Challenge Cup qualification | Philippines | 2–0 | Mongolia | 20,000 |
| 11 October 2013 | 2013 Philippine Peace Cup | Philippines | 1–2 | Chinese Taipei | |
| 13 October 2013 | 2013 Philippine Peace Cup | Chinese Taipei | 0–1 | Pakistan | |
| 15 October 2013 | 2013 Philippine Peace Cup | Philippines | 3–1 | Pakistan | |
| 5 September 2017 | 2019 AFC Asian Cup qualification – third round | Philippines | 1–1 | Yemen | 2,169 |
| 13 November 2018 | 2018 AFF Championship | Philippines | 1–0 | Singapore | 4,327 |
| 21 November 2018 | 2018 AFF Championship | Philippines | 1–1 | Thailand | 3,522 |
| 5 September 2019 | 2022 FIFA World Cup qualification – AFC second round | Philippines | 2–5 | Syria | 2,645 |
| 15 October 2019 | 2022 FIFA World Cup qualification – AFC second round | Philippines | 0–0 | China | 2,982 |

== Tenants ==
The Panaad Park and Sports Complex has been the permanent home of the Panaad sa Negros Festival, an annual festival held every April. Panaad is the Hiligaynon word for "vow" or "promise"; the festival has religious significance, serving as a form of thanksgiving to the Divine Providence. The festival is participated by the 13 cities and 19 towns of Negros Occidental.

The facility also served as the home venue for Ceres Negros. The Panaad Stadium has also hosted matches of the Philippines men's and women's national football team such as the men's competition at the 2005 Southeast Asian Games and the 1999 AFC Women's Championship.

== See also ==
- List of football stadiums in the Philippines
- Rizal Memorial Stadium
- New Clark City Athletics Stadium
- Philippine Sports Stadium
- Biñan Football Stadium
- PFF National Training Center
