= Kyrgyzstan national football team results =

This page shows the Kyrgyzstan national football team's results in International Matches, as recognized by FIFA:

== Overview of results ==
As of match played 4 October 2026

| Type | Record | | | | | | |
| Type | G | W | D | L | GF | GA | Win % |
|---|---|---|---|---|---|---|---|
| Friendly Matches | 58 | 9 | 16 | 33 | 44 | 103 | 15.52 |
| AFC Asian Cup qualification | 18 | 8 | 2 | 8 | 27 | 29 | 44.44 |
| AFC Asian Cup | 7 | 1 | 2 | 4 | 7 | 11 | 14.29 |
| AFC Challenge Cup qualification | 10 | 5 | 2 | 3 | 12 | 10 | 50 |
| AFC Challenge Cup | 10 | 4 | 0 | 6 | 5 | 11 | 40 |
| FIFA World Cup qualification | 55 | 20 | 9 | 26 | 82 | 86 | 36.36 |
| Other Tournaments | 22 | 6 | 2 | 14 | 23 | 47 | 27.27 |
| Total | 180 | 53 | 33 | 94 | 200 | 298 | 29.44 |

== International Matches ==
=== 1992–1999 ===
| Type | GP | W | D | L | GF | GA |
|---|---|---|---|---|---|---|
| Friendly Matches | 4 | 0 | 1 | 3 | 1 | 9 |
| 1996 AFC ACQ | 4 | 1 | 0 | 3 | 3 | 7 |
| 1998 WCQ | 5 | 3 | 0 | 2 | 12 | 11 |
| 2000 AFC ACQ | 3 | 0 | 0 | 3 | 3 | 11 |
| Total | 16 | 4 | 1 | 11 | 19 | 38 |

==== 1994 ====
| 13 April 1994 Friendly | Turkmenistan | 5–1 | Kyrgyzstan | Tashkent, Uzbekistan |
| KGT (UTC+6) | Mingazov 11'; R.Muhadov 13'; Zolotukhin 20'; Mar.Dzhumakeev 25' (o.g.); R.Muhadov 31' | | Sergeyev 65' | Stadium: MHSK Stadium; Attendance: 1,000; Referee: A.Kulakov (Kazakhstan) |

| 15 April 1994 Friendly | Tajikistan | 1–0 | Kyrgyzstan | Tashkent, Uzbekistan |
| KGT (UTC+6) | Erofeev 67' | | Urme (red card) 62' | Stadium: MHSK Stadium; Attendance: 3,000; Referee: E.Ramazanov (Turkmenistan) |

| 17 April 1994 Friendly | Kazakhstan | 0–0 | Kyrgyzstan | Tashkent, Uzbekistan |
| KGT (UTC+6) | | | K.Ishenbaev (red card) 67' | Stadium: MHSK Stadium; Attendance: 2,700; Referee: B.Haydarov (Uzbekistan) |

| 19 April 1994 Friendly | Uzbekistan | 3–0 | Kyrgyzstan | Tashkent, Uzbekistan |
| KGT (UTC+6) | Maxudov 5'; Durmonov 22'; Marifaliev 25' | | | Stadium: Central Stadium Pakhtakor; Attendance: 30,000; Referee: A.Sapaev (Turkmenistan) |

==== 1996 ====
| 24 January 1996 1996 AFC ACQ | Saudi Arabia | 3–0 | Kyrgyzstan | Riyadh, Saudi Arabia |
| KGT (UTC+6) | Al-Thunayan 7', 38'; Amin 57' (pen.) | | | Stadium: King Fahd International Stadium; Attendance: 2,000; Referee: Mohammed Kekhia (Syria) |

| 26 January 1996 1996 AFC ACQ | Yemen | 1–0 | Kyrgyzstan | Riyadh, Saudi Arabia |
| KGT (UTC+6) | Sharaf Mahfood 57' | | | Stadium: King Fahd International Stadium; Attendance: 1,000; Referee: Jalal Moradi (Iran) |

| 31 January 1996 1996 AFC ACQ | Kyrgyzstan | 0–2 | Saudi Arabia | Riyadh, Saudi Arabia |
| KGT (UTC+6) | | | Falatah 25'; Al-Thunayan 67' | Stadium: King Fahd International Stadium; Attendance: 2,000; Referee: Jassim Al-Khori (Qatar) |

| 2 February 1996 1996 AFC ACQ | Kyrgyzstan | 3–1 | Yemen | Riyadh, Saudi Arabia |
| KGT (UTC+6) | Kadyrov 43'; Rybakov 50'; Khaytbaev 75' | | Ben Rabah 21' | Stadium: King Fahd International Stadium; Attendance: 1,000; Referee: Mohammed Kekhia (Syria) |

==== 1997 ====
| 4 June 1997 1998 WCQ | Kyrgyzstan | 0–7 | Iran | Damascus, Syria |
| 15:30 KGT (UTC+6) | | report | Bagheri 35', 51'; Daei 57'; Majidi 68', 88'; Minavand 76'; Mousavi 82' | Stadium: Abbasiyyin Stadium; Attendance: 8,000; Referee: Shamsul Maidin (Singapore) |

| 6 June 1997 1998 WCQ | Kyrgyzstan | 3–0 | Maldives | Damascus, Syria |
| KGT (UTC+6) | Korzanov 4'; Merzlikin 24'; Yusupov 28' | report | | Stadium: Abbasiyyin Stadium; Attendance: 7,000; Referee: Wang Xuezhi (China) |

| 9 June 1997 1998 WCQ | Iran | 3–1 | Kyrgyzstan | Tehran, Iran |
| KGT (UTC+6) | Azizi 3', 77'; Bagheri 52' | report | Kutsov 16' | Stadium: Azadi Stadium; Attendance: 50,000; Referee: Pirom Un-Prasert (Thailand) |

| 11 June 1997 1998 WCQ | Kyrgyzstan | 2–1 | Syria | Tehran, Iran |
| KGT (UTC+6) | Sardarov 76'; Kutsov 89' | report | Boshi 84' | Stadium: Azadi Stadium; Attendance: 15,000; Referee: Yu Jingyin (China) |

| 13 June 1997 1998 WCQ | Maldives | 0–6 | Kyrgyzstan | Tehran, Iran |
| KGT (UTC+6) | | report | Merzlikin 14'; Chertkov 22'; Kutsov 26'; Haitbaev 47', 89'; Ivanov 47' | Stadium: Azadi Stadium; Attendance: 70,000; Referee: Fahed Al-Damisi (Jordan) |

==== 1999 ====
| 3 August 1999 2000 AFC ACQ | Oman | 3–0 | Kyrgyzstan | Dushanbe, Tajikistan |
| KGT (UTC+6) | Al-Wahaibi 7'; Al-Habsi 39', 90' | | | Stadium: Central Stadium; Attendance: 5,000; Referee: Saeed Abdullah Ibrahim (United Arab Emirates) |

| 5 August 1999 2000 AFC ACQ | Kyrgyzstan | 2–3 | Tajikistan | Dushanbe, Tajikistan |
| KGT (UTC+6) | Zhumagulov 45'; Berdaly 75' | | Muminov 6' 11' (pen.); Nazarov 57' | Stadium: Central Stadium; Attendance: 6,000; Referee: Saeed Abdullah Ibrahim (U.A.E) |

| 7 August 1999 2000 AFC ACQ | Iraq | 5–1 | Kyrgyzstan | Dushanbe, Tajikistan |
| KGT (UTC+6) | Razzaq Farhan 54'; Hussam Fawzi 60'; Esam Salem 62'; Abbas Obeid 67' 80' | | Zakirov 51' | Stadium: Central Stadium; Attendance: 5,000; Referee: Fereydoun Esfahanian (Iran) |

=== 2000–2009 ===
| Type | GP | W | D | L | GF | GA |
|---|---|---|---|---|---|---|
| Friendly Matches | 7 | 0 | 1 | 6 | 1 | 13 |
| 2000 West Asian Football Federation Championship | 3 | 0 | 0 | 3 | 0 | 8 |
| 2002 FIFA World Cup qualification | 6 | 1 | 1 | 4 | 3 | 9 |
| 2004 AFC Asian Cup qualification | 2 | 1 | 0 | 1 | 3 | 2 |
| 2006 FIFA World Cup qualification | 8 | 3 | 1 | 4 | 11 | 12 |
| 2006 AFC Challenge Cup | 5 | 3 | 0 | 2 | 4 | 3 |
| Alma TV Cup | 3 | 0 | 0 | 3 | 0 | 9 |
| 2007 Nehru Cup | 4 | 2 | 0 | 2 | 8 | 10 |
| 2010 FIFA World Cup qualification | 2 | 1 | 0 | 1 | 2 | 2 |
| 2008 AFC Challenge Cup qualification | 2 | 1 | 0 | 1 | 2 | 2 |
| 2010 AFC Challenge Cup qualification | 2 | 0 | 2 | 0 | 2 | 2 |
| 2009 Nehru Cup | 4 | 1 | 1 | 2 | 6 | 6 |
| Total | 48 | 13 | 6 | 29 | 42 | 78 |

==== 2000 ====
| 23 May 2000 2000 WAFFC | Jordan | 2–0 | Kyrgyzstan | Amman, Jordan |
| KGT (UTC+6) | Abu Zema 27' (pen.); Al-Shagran 68' | [ Report] | | Stadium: King Abdullah Stadium; Attendance: 14,000; Referee: (Syria) |

| 25 May 2000 2000 WAFFC | Lebanon | 2–0 | Kyrgyzstan | Amman, Jordan |
| KGT (UTC+6) | Zein 41'; Antar 76' | [ Report] | M.Dzhumakeev (red card) 90' | Stadium: King Abdullah Stadium; Attendance: 3,000; Referee: K.Ordabaev (Uzbekistan) |

| 27 May 2000 2000 WAFFC | Iraq | 4–0 | Kyrgyzstan | Amman, Jordan |
| KGT (UTC+6) | Farhan 28', 35', 75'; Hesham Mohammed 67' | [ Report] | | Stadium: King Abdullah Stadium; Attendance: 3,000; Referee: N. Abu Erman |

| 15 November 2000 Friendly | Estonia | 1–0 | Kyrgyzstan | Kuressaare, Estonia |
| KGT (UTC+6) | Anniste 54' | [ Report] | | Stadium: Kuressaare linnastaadion Attendance: 750; Referee: Timofeyev (Estonia) |

==== 2001 ====
| 30 January 2001 Friendly | Thailand | 3–1 | Kyrgyzstan | Bangkok, Thailand |
| KGT (UTC+6) | 47'; 58'; 62' (pen.) | [ Report] | Berezovskiy (red card); Sidikov (red card) 53'; Kudrenko 80' | Stadium: National Stadium; Attendance: 5,000; Referee: (Thailand) |

| 3 February 2001 2002 WCQ | Singapore | 0–1 | Kyrgyzstan | Kallang, Singapore |
| 18:00 KGT (UTC+6) | | Report | I.Kovalenko 83' | Stadium: National Stadium; Attendance: 25,000; Referee: Abdul Aziz A. Al Dokhail (Saudi Arabia) |

| 6 February 2001 2002 WCQ | Bahrain | 1–0 | Kyrgyzstan | Kallang, Singapore |
| 16:00 KGT (UTC+6) | Al Sadi 86' | Report | | Stadium: National Stadium; Attendance: 10,000; Referee: Kazuhiko Matsumura (Japan) |

| 9 February 2001 2002 WCQ | Kyrgyzstan | 0–3 | Kuwait | Kallang, Singapore |
| 16:00 KGT (UTC+6) | | Report | Asel 61'; Al Huwaidi 85'; Al-Mutairi 90' | Stadium: National Stadium; Attendance: 7,000; Referee: Zhu Liuyi (China) |

| 21 February 2001 2002 WCQ | Kyrgyzstan | 1–2 | Bahrain | Kuwait City, Kuwait |
| 19:45 KGT (UTC+6) | Zhumagulov 8' | Report | Salmeen 23'; Hassan 74'; Al Doseri (yellow card) 32' (red card) 82' | Stadium: Kuwait National Stadium; Attendance: 1,099; Referee: Park Sang-Gu (South Korea) |

| 24 February 2001 2002 WCQ | Kuwait | 2–0 | Kyrgyzstan | Kuwait City, Kuwait |
| 19:45 KGT (UTC+6) | Al Huwaidi 21'; Laheeb 87' | Report | | Stadium: Kuwait National Stadium; Attendance: 8,000; Referee: Zhang Yeduan (China) |

| 27 February 2001 2002 WCQ | Kyrgyzstan | 1–1 | Singapore | Kuwait City, Kuwait |
| 19:45 KGT (UTC+6) | I.Kovalenko 77' | Report | Ratna 60' | Stadium: Kuwait National Stadium; Attendance: 25,099; Referee: Mohammad Abdur Rakib (Bangladesh) |

==== 2003 ====
| 16 March 2003 2004 AFC ACQ | Kyrgyzstan | 1–2 | Afghanistan | Kathmandu, Nepal |
| KGT (UTC+6) | Zhumagulov 63' | | Tahir Shah 25'; Farid Azami 76' | Stadium: Dasarath Rangasala Stadium; Attendance: 1,000; Referee: Jehangir Khan (Pakistan) |

| 20 March 2003 2004 AFC ACQ | Nepal | 0–2 | Kyrgyzstan | Kathmandu, Nepal |
| KGT (UTC+6) | | | Pryanishnikov 27', 45' | Stadium: Dasarath Rangasala Stadium; Attendance: 5,000; Referee: Rizwan Ul Haq (India) |

| 29 November 2003 2006 WCQ | Pakistan | 0–2 | Kyrgyzstan | Karachi, Pakistan |
| 15:00 KGT (UTC+6) | | (Report) | Boldygin 36'; Chikishev 59' | Stadium: People's Football Stadium; Attendance: 10,000; Referee: Ibrahim Nesar (Bangladesh) |

| 3 December 2003 2006 WCQ | Kyrgyzstan | 4–0 (6–0 agg.) | Pakistan | Bishkek, Kyrgyzstan |
| 13:00 KGT (UTC+6) | Chikishev 18'; Chertkov 28'; Boldygin 67'; Krasnov 92' | (Report) | | Stadium: Spartak Stadium; Attendance: 12,000; Referee: Mamed Mamedov (Turkmenistan) |

==== 2004 ====
| 18 February 2004 2006 WCQ | Kyrgyzstan | 1–2 | Tajikistan | Bishkek, Kyrgyzstan |
| 15:00 KGT (UTC+6) | Berezovskiy 12' | (Report) | Burkhanov 31', 53' | Stadium: Spartak Stadium; Attendance: 14,000; Referee: Nail Lutfullin (Uzbekistan) |

| 31 March 2004 2006 WCQ | Kyrgyzstan | 1–1 | Syria | Bishkek, Kyrgyzstan |
| 16:00 KGT (UTC+6) | Ishenbaev 55' | (Report) | Kailouni 86' | Stadium: Spartak Stadium; Attendance: 17,000; Referee: Praveer Bose (India) |

| 4 April 2004 Friendly | Qatar | 0–0 | Kyrgyzstan | Doha, Qatar |
| KGT (UTC+6) | | | | Stadium: Thani bin Jassim Stadium; Attendance: 100; Referee: (Qatar) |

| 9 June 2004 2006 WCQ | Bahrain | 5–0 | Kyrgyzstan | Arad, Bahrain |
| 19:15 KGT (UTC+6) | A. Hubail 12', 45', 60'; Ali 66'; Abdulla 82' | (Report) | | Stadium: Al Muharraq Stadium; Attendance: 2,800; Referee: Mohamed Al Saeedi (United Arab Emirates) |

| 8 September 2004 2006 WCQ | Kyrgyzstan | 1–2 | Bahrain | Bishkek, Kyrgyzstan |
| 17:00 KGT (UTC+6) | Kenjisariev 86'; Sidikov (yellow card) 18' (yellow-red card) 87' | (Report) | Ali 23'; M. Hubail 58' | Stadium: Spartak Stadium; Attendance: 10,000; Referee: Mongkol Rungklay (Thailand) |

| 13 October 2004 2006 WCQ | Tajikistan | 2–1 | Kyrgyzstan | Dushanbe, Tajikistan |
| 15:00 KGT (UTC+6) | Rabiev 19'; Hakimov 37' | (Report) | Chikishev 84' | Stadium: Pamir Stadium; Attendance: 11,000; Referee: Naser Al Enezi (Kuwait) |

| 10 November 2004 Friendly | Kuwait | 3–0 | Kyrgyzstan | Kuwait City, Kuwait |
| KGT (UTC+6) | Al-Mutawa 17'; Hazan 53'; Lahib 69' | | | Stadium: Al-Sadaqua Walsalam Stadium; Attendance: 1,500; Referee: Hamid Arab (Kuwait) |

| 17 November 2004 2006 WCQ | Syria | 0–1 | Kyrgyzstan | Damascus, Syria |
| 17:00 KGT (UTC+6) | | (Report) | Amin 47' | Stadium: Abbasiyyin Stadium; Attendance: 1,000; Referee: Satop Tongkhan (Thailand) |

==== 2006 ====
| 2 April 2006 2006 AFC CC | Kyrgyzstan | 0–1 | Pakistan | Bangabandhu Stadium, Dhaka |
| 18:00 UTC+6 | | Report | Essa 59' | Attendance: 2,500; Referee: Tayeb Shamsuzzaman (Bangladesh) |

| 6 April 2006 2006 AFC CC | Tajikistan | 0–1 | Kyrgyzstan | Bangabandhu Stadium, Dhaka |
| 14:00 UTC+6 | | Report | Krasnov 22' | Attendance: 2,000; Referee: Ala Abdul (Iraq) |

| 7 April 2006 2006 AFC CC | Macau | 0–2 | Kyrgyzstan | Bangabandhu Stadium, Dhaka |
| 14:00 UTC+6 | | Report | Ablakimov 35'; A.Ishenbaev 58' | Attendance: 1,000; Referee: Tan Hai (China PR) |

| 9 April 2006 2006 AFC CC | Palestine | 0–1 | Kyrgyzstan | Bangabandhu Stadium, Dhaka |
| 15:30 UTC+6 | | Report | Djamshidov 90+1' | Attendance: 150; Referee: Win Cho (Myanmar) |

| 13 April 2006 2006 AFC CC | Kyrgyzstan | 0–2 | Tajikistan | Bangabandhu Stadium, Dhaka |
| 15:30 UTC+6 | | Report | Rabiev 51', 90+2' | Attendance: 2,000; Referee: Tan Hai (China PR) |

| 5 July 2006 Friendly | Kazakhstan | 1–0 | Kyrgyzstan | Almaty Central Stadium, Almaty |
| UTC+6 | States 20' (pen.) | | | Attendance: 1,800; Referee: N.Lutfullin (Uzbekistan) |

==== 2007 ====
| 7 March 2007 Alma TV Cup | Kazakhstan | 2–0 | Kyrgyzstan | Shymkent Kazakhstan |
| 16:00 KGT (UTC+6) | Byakov 3'; Chichulin 68' | | | Stadium: Kazhimukan Munaitpasov; Referee: Irmatov (Uzbekistan) |

| 9 March 2007 Alma TV Cup | Uzbekistan | 6–0 | Kyrgyzstan | Shymkent Kazakhstan |
| 12:00 KGT (UTC+6) | Soliev 2'; Bakayev 5' (pen.), 42', 89'; Manzukas 63'; Shishelov 81' | (Report) | | Stadium: Kazhimukan Munaitpasov; Referee: Igor Kister (Kazakhstan) |

| 11 March 2007 Alma TV Cup | Azerbaijan | 1–0 | Kyrgyzstan | Shymkent Kazakhstan |
| 14:00 KGT (UTC+6) | Javadov 18' | (Report) | | Stadium: Kazhimukan Munaitpasov; Referee: Vusal Aliyev (Azerbaijan) |

| 19 August 2007 2007 Nehru Cup | Kyrgyzstan | 4–3 | Cambodia | New Delhi India |
| 19:30 UTC+6 | Samsaliev 12'; Mamatov 17'; Djamshidov 48'; Harchenko 65' | [ ] | Sotitya 34'; Rithy 40'; Chum 43' | Stadium: Ambedkar Stadium; Referee: Suresh (India) |

| 21 August 2007 2007 Nehru Cup | Syria | 4–1 | Kyrgyzstan | New Delhi India |
| 19:30 UTC+6 | Al Sayed 7'; Chaabo 44'; Al Zeno 70'; Al Hasan 82' | [ ] | Diab 13' (o.g.) | Stadium: Ambedkar Stadium; Referee: Suresh (India) |

| 24 August 2007 2007 Nehru Cup | Bangladesh | 0–3 | Kyrgyzstan | New Delhi India |
| 19:30 UTC+6 | | [ ] | Lutfullaev 28', 54'; Djamshidov 57' | Stadium: Ambedkar Stadium; Referee: Suresh (India) |

| 26 August 2007 2007 Nehru Cup | India | 3–0 | Kyrgyzstan | New Delhi India |
| 19:30 UTC+6 | Bhutia 39'; Chhetri 60'; Yadav 90+3' | [ ] | | Stadium: Ambedkar Stadium; Referee: Surendra (Nepal) |

| 18 October 2007 2010 WCQ | Kyrgyzstan | 2–0 | Jordan | Bishkek Kyrgyzstan |
| 15:30 UTC+6 | Esenkul Uulu 45'; Bokoev 76' | Report | | Stadium: Spartak Stadium; Attendance: 18,000; Referee: Subrata Sarkar (India) |

| 28 October 2007 2010 WCQ | Jordan | 2–0 (a.e.t.) (6–5 p) | Kyrgyzstan | Amman Jordan |
| 22:00 UTC+6 | Shelbaieh 34'; Aqel 51' (pen.) | Report | | Stadium: Amman International Stadium; Attendance: 12,000; Referee: Abdulhameed Ebrahim (Bahrain) |
| | Penalties |
| | Abu Alieh (penalty scored); Bawab (penalty scored); Abu Keshek (penalty scored); Amer (penalty scored); Aqel (penalty scored); Bashar (penalty scored) | | (penalty scored) Kudrenko; (penalty scored) Harchenko; (penalty scored) Samsaliev; (penalty scored) Sydykov; (penalty scored) Esenkul Uulu; (penalty missed) Vyacheslav |

==== 2008 ====
| 27 April 2008 Friendly | Oman | 2–0 | Kyrgyzstan | Muscat, Oman |
| | Al Muhaini 45'; Y.Mubarak 70' | [ Report] |

| 7 May 2008 2008 AFC CCQ | Kyrgyzstan | 0–1 | Afghanistan | Bishkek, Kyrgyzstan |
| 17:30 UTC+6 | | Report | Yamrali 38'; Barekzay (yellow card) 78' (yellow-red card) 90+6' | Stadium: Spartak Stadium; Attendance: 7,000; Referee: Rosdi Shaharul (Malaysia) |

| 9 May 2008 2008 AFC CCQ | Kyrgyzstan | 2–1 | Bangladesh | Bishkek, Kyrgyzstan |
| 17:30 UTC+6 | Kornilov 83'; Sydykov 87' | Report | Ameli 63' | Stadium: Spartak Stadium; Attendance: 5,000; Referee: Atallah Jatli Al-Enezi (Kuwait) |

==== 2009 ====
| 28 March 2009 2010 AFC CCQ | Kyrgyzstan | 1–1 | Nepal | Kathmandu, Nepal |
| 15:15 KGT (UTC+6) | Murzaev 86' (pen.) | Report | Maharjan 2' | Stadium: Dasarath Rangasala Stadium; Attendance: 15,000; Referee: Yadollah Jahanbazi (Iran) |

| 30 March 2009 2010 AFC CCQ | Kyrgyzstan | 1–1 | Palestine | Kathmandu, Nepal |
| 15:15 KGT (UTC+6) | Murzaev 20' (pen.) | Report | Al-Sobakhi 29' | Stadium: Dasarath Rangasala Stadium; Attendance: 2,000; Referee: Yu Ming-hsun (Chinese Taipei) |

| 25 July 2009 Friendly | China | 3–0 | Kyrgyzstan | Tianjin, China |
| KGT (UTC+6) | Han Peng 17'; Hao Junmin 28'; Yu Hai 46' | | | Stadium: TEDA Football Stadium; Attendance: 20,000; Referee: Tao Rancheng (China) |

| 20 August 2009 2009 Nehru Cup | Syria | 2–0 | Kyrgyzstan | New Delhi, India |
| 19:00 KGT (UTC+6) | Al Zeno 9'; Al Agha 72' | Report; Summary | Ablakimov (red card) 67' | Stadium: Ambedkar Stadium; Referee: Pratap Singh (India) |

| 23 August 2009 2009 Nehru Cup | India | 2–1 | Kyrgyzstan | New Delhi, India |
| 19:00 KGT (UTC+6) | Bhutia 43'; Chhetri 58' (pen.) | Report; Summary | Murzaev 90' | Stadium: Ambedkar Stadium |

| 25 August 2009 2009 Nehru Cup | Kyrgyzstan | 1–1 | Lebanon | New Delhi, India |
| 19:00 KGT (UTC+6) | Zemlianukhin 48' | Report; Summary | Atwi 56' | Stadium: Ambedkar Stadium; Referee: Miron Abdul Hannan (Bangladesh) |

| 28 August 2009 2009 Nehru Cup | Sri Lanka | 1–4 | Kyrgyzstan | New Delhi, India |
| 19:00 KGT (UTC+6) | Maduranga 53' | Report; Summary | Zemlianukhin 34'; Amirov 45+1'; Murzaev 65'; Usanov 70' | Stadium: Ambedkar Stadium; Referee: Pratap Singh (India) |

=== 2010–2019 ===
| Type | GP | W | D | L | GF | GA |
|---|---|---|---|---|---|---|
| Friendly Matches | 25 | 4 | 8 | 13 | 18 | 49 |
| 2010 AFC Challenge Cup | 2 | 0 | 0 | 2 | 0 | 5 |
| 2012 AFC Challenge Cup qualification | 3 | 1 | 0 | 2 | 5 | 6 |
| 2014 AFC Challenge Cup qualification | 3 | 3 | 0 | 0 | 3 | 0 |
| 2014 FIFA World Cup qualification | 2 | 0 | 0 | 2 | 0 | 7 |
| 2014 AFC Challenge Cup | 3 | 1 | 0 | 2 | 1 | 3 |
| 2018 FIFA World Cup qualification | 8 | 4 | 2 | 2 | 10 | 8 |
| 2019 AFC Asian Cup qualification | 6 | 4 | 1 | 1 | 14 | 8 |
| 2019 AFC Asian Cup | 4 | 1 | 0 | 3 | 6 | 7 |
| 2022 FIFA World Cup qualification | 5 | 2 | 1 | 2 | 10 | 5 |
| Total | 61 | 20 | 12 | 29 | 67 | 98 |

==== 2010 ====
| 19 February 2010 2010 AFC CC | Kyrgyzstan | 0–4 | North Korea | Colombo, Sri Lanka |
| KGT (UTC+6) | | Report | Pak Song-Chol 29'; Pak Kwang-Ryong 47'; Choe Myong-Ho 65'; Ri Chol-Myong 68' | Stadium: Sugathadasa Stadium; Attendance: 300; Referee: Andre El Haddad (Lebanon) |

| 21 February 2010 2010 AFC CC | Turkmenistan | 1–0 | Kyrgyzstan | Colombo, Sri Lanka |
| KGT (UTC+6) | Nurmyradow 70' | Report | | Stadium: CR & FC Grounds; Attendance: 100; Referee: Andre El Haddad (Lebanon) |

==== 2011 ====
| 21 March 2011 2012 AFC CCQ | Tajikistan | 1–0 | Kyrgyzstan | Malé, Maldives |
| 17:00 KGT (UTC+6) | R. Sydykov 88' (o.g.) | Report | | Stadium: National Stadium; Attendance: 4,000; Referee: Mohammed Mohamed (UAE) |

| 23 March 2011 2012 AFC CCQ | Kyrgyzstan | 1–2 | Maldives | Malé, Maldives |
| 17:00 KGT (UTC+6) | Abdul Ghanee 87' (o.g.) | Report | Ali 5'; Qasim 79' | Stadium: National Stadium; Attendance: 9,000; Referee: Marai Al Awaji (Saudi Arabia) |

| 25 March 2011 2012 AFC CCQ | Cambodia | 3–4 | Kyrgyzstan | Malé, Maldives |
| 22:00 KGT (UTC+6) | Sokumpheak 39', 49'; Rithy 89' | Report | A. Sydykov 5'; Usanov 45+1'; Esenkul Uulu 80', 85' | Stadium: National Stadium; Attendance: 1,000; Referee: Zhao Liang (China PR) |

| 23 July 2011 2014 WCQ | Uzbekistan | 4–0 | Kyrgyzstan | Tashkent, Uzbekistan |
| 20:00 KGT (UTC+6) | Geynrikh 28'; Bikmaev 48'; Djeparov 55'; Bakayev 90+2' | Report | | Stadium: Pakhtakor Markaziy Stadium; Attendance: 20,257; Referee: Abdullah Balideh (Qatar) |

| 28 July 2011 2014 WCQ | Kyrgyzstan | 0–3 | Uzbekistan | Bishkek, Kyrgyzstan |
| 18:00 KGT (UTC+6) | | Report | Karpenko 47'; Nasimov 65', 90' | Stadium: Spartak Stadium; Attendance: 14,700; Referee: Ali Abdulnabi (Bahrain) |

==== 2012 ====
| 1 June 2012 Friendly | Kazakhstan | 5–2 | Kyrgyzstan | Almaty, Kazakhstan |
| 19:00 KGT (UTC+6) | Y. Logvinenko 4'; D. Tazhimbetov 13', 32', 90'; K. Nurdauletov 57' (pen.) | Summary | A. Baymatov 27'; K. Sharipov 36' | Stadium: Almaty Central Stadium; Attendance: 14,000; Referee: Olim Talibdjanov (Uzbekistan) |

==== 2013 ====
| 17 March 2013 2014 AFC CCQ | Kyrgyzstan | 1–0 | Macau | Bishkek, Kyrgyzstan |
| 16:00 KGT (UTC+6) | Tetteh 45+1' | Report | | Stadium: Spartak Stadium; Attendance: 6,000; Referee: Ali Sabah Adday Al-Qaysi (Iraq) |

| 19 March 2013 2014 AFC CCQ | Pakistan | 0–1 | Kyrgyzstan | Bishkek, Kyrgyzstan |
| 16:00 KGT (UTC+6) | | Report | Tetteh 1' | Stadium: Spartak Stadium; Attendance: 12,000; Referee: Ammar Al-Jeneibi (UAE) |

| 21 March 2013 2014 AFC CCQ | Kyrgyzstan | 1–0 | Tajikistan | Bishkek, Kyrgyzstan |
| 16:00 KGT (UTC+6) | Tetteh 41' | Report | | Stadium: Spartak Stadium; Attendance: 15,500; Referee: Masoud Tufayelieh (Syria) |

| 11 June 2013 Friendly | Estonia | 1–1 | Kyrgyzstan | Tallinn, Estonia |
| 23:00 KGT (UTC+6) | Puri 45+2' | Report | Kharchenko 67' | Stadium: A. Le Coq Arena; Referee: Sergey Tsinkevich (Belarus) |

| 14 June 2013 Friendly | Moldova | 2–1 | Kyrgyzstan | Tiraspol, Moldova |
| 23:00 KGT (UTC+6) | Sidorenco 30', 78' | Report | Kum (yellow card) 32' (yellow-red card) 38'; Kharchenko 57' | Stadium: Sheriff Stadium; Referee: Olexander Derd (Ukraine) |

| 6 September 2013 Friendly | Belarus | 3–1 | Kyrgyzstan | Minsk, Belarus |
| 22:00 KGT (UTC+6) | Balanovich 30'; Rodionov 38'; Sitko 69' | [ Report] | Rustamov 56' | Stadium: Dynama Stadium; Referee: Nerijus Dunauskas (Lithuania) |

| 1 November 2013 Friendly | Indonesia | 4–0 | Kyrgyzstan | Jakarta, Indonesia |
| 18:30 KGT (UTC+6) | Zulham 27', 37'; Bonai 66'; Jufriyanto 70' | | | Stadium: Gelora Bung Karno Stadium; Attendance: 1,527; Referee: Mohd Nafeez Bin Abdul Wahab, (Malaysia) |

| 19 November 2013 Friendly | Kyrgyzstan | 0–0 | Azerbaijan | Bishkek, Kyrgyzstan |
| 15:00 KGT (UTC+6) | | Report | | Stadium: Spartak Stadium; Referee: Artyom Kuchin (Kazakhstan) |

==== 2014 ====
| 13 April 2014 Friendly | Afghanistan | 0–0 | Kyrgyzstan | Dubai, United Arab Emirates |
| 17:50 KGT (UTC+6) | | Report | | Stadium: Al-Shaab Stadium |

| 12 May 2014 Friendly | Afghanistan | 1–0 | Kyrgyzstan | Kuwait City, Kuwait |
| 21:00 KGT (UTC+6) | Mashriqi | Report | | Stadium: Al Kuwait Sports Club Stadium |

| 16 May 2014 Friendly | Kuwait | 2–2 | Kyrgyzstan | Kuwait City, Kuwait |
| 23:45 KGT (UTC+6) | 41'; 89' | [ Report] | Israilov 18'; Baymatov 90' | Stadium: Al Kuwait Sports Club Stadium |

| 19 May 2014 2014 AFC CC | Palestine | 1–0 | Kyrgyzstan | Malé, Maldives |
| 17:00 KGT (UTC+6) | Abuhabib 90+6' | Report | | Stadium: National Football Stadium; Attendance: 500; Referee: Yudai Yamamoto (Japan) |

| 21 May 2014 2014 AFC CC | Kyrgyzstan | 0–2 | Maldives | Malé, Maldives |
| 22:00 KGT (UTC+6) | | Report | Ashfaq 61', 71' | Stadium: National Football Stadium; Attendance: 8,000; Referee: Wang Di (China PR) |

| 23 May 2014 2014 AFC CC | Kyrgyzstan | 1–0 | Myanmar | Addu City, Maldives |
| 22:00 KGT (UTC+6) | Verevkin 18' | Report | | Stadium: Addu Football Stadium; Attendance: 300; Referee: Ko Hyung-jin (South Korea) |

| 5 September 2014 Friendly | Kazakhstan | 7–1 | Kyrgyzstan | Astana, Kazakhstan |
| 19:00 KZT (UTC+6) | Khizhnichenko 27', 43'; Nusserbayev 36'; Islamkhan 55'; Dzholchiev 70'; Konysbayev 81'; Nurgaliev 87' | Summary | Zhyrgalbek Uulu 72' | Stadium: Astana Arena; Referee: Sergey Tsinkevich (Belarus) |

==== 2015 ====
| 11 June 2015 2018 WCQ | Bangladesh | 1–3 | Kyrgyzstan | Dhaka, Bangladesh |
| 17:00 KGT (UTC+6) | Kichin 32' (o.g.) | Report | Zemlianukhin 8', 41'; Bernhardt 29' (pen.) | Stadium: Bangabandhu Stadium, Dhaka; Attendance: 10,000; Referee: Sukhbir Singh (Singapore) |

| 16 June 2015 2018 WCQ | Kyrgyzstan | 1–2 | Australia | Bishkek, Kyrgyzstan |
| 20:00 KGT (UTC+6) | Baymatov 90+2' | Report (FIFA); Report (AFC) | Jedinak 2'; Oar 67' | Stadium: Spartak Stadium; Attendance: 18,000; Referee: Khamis Al-Marri (Qatar) |

| 3 September 2015 2018 WCQ | Jordan | 0–0 | Kyrgyzstan | Amman, Jordan |
| 22:00 KGT (UTC+6) | | Report (FIFA); Report (AFC) | | Stadium: Amman International Stadium; Attendance: 5,012; Referee: Mohd Amirul Izwan Yaacob (Malaysia) |

| 8 October 2015 2018 WCQ | Kyrgyzstan | 2–2 | Tajikistan | Bishkek, Kyrgyzstan |
| 20:00 KGT (UTC+6) | Duyshobekov 7'; Zemlianukhin 90+4' (pen.) | Report (FIFA); Report (AFC) | Jalilov 65'; Vosiyev 71' (pen.) | Stadium: Spartak Stadium; Attendance: 17,600; Referee: Mooud Bonyadifar (Iran) |

| 13 October 2015 2018 WCQ | Kyrgyzstan | 2–0 | Bangladesh | Bishkek, Kyrgyzstan |
| 18:00 KGT (UTC+6) | Lux 27'; Amirov 89' | Report (FIFA); Report (AFC) | | Stadium: Spartak Stadium; Attendance: 12,001; Referee: Jameel Abdulhusin (Bahrain) |

| 12 November 2015 2018 WCQ | Australia | 3–0 | Kyrgyzstan | Canberra, Australia |
| 15:00 KGT (UTC+6) | Jedinak 40' (pen.); Cahill 50'; Amirov 69' (o.g.) | FIFA Report; AFC Report | | Stadium: Canberra Stadium; Attendance: 19,412; Referee: Kim Sang-woo (South Korea) |

| 17 November 2015 2018 WCQ | Kyrgyzstan | 1–0 | Jordan | Bishkek, Kyrgyzstan |
| 17:30 KGT (UTC+6) | Zemlianukhin 48' | Report (FIFA); Report (AFC) | | Stadium: Spartak Stadium; Referee: Çarymyrat Kurbanow (Turkmenistan) |

==== 2016 ====
| 29 March 2016 2018 WCQ | Tajikistan | 0–1 | Kyrgyzstan | Dushanbe, Tajikistan |
| 19:00 KGT (UTC+6) | | Report (FIFA); Report (AFC) | Lux 18' | Stadium: Pamir Stadium; Referee: Aziz Asimov (Uzbekistan) |

| 7 June 2016 Friendly | Iran | 6–0 | Kyrgyzstan | Tehran, Iran |
| | Shojaei 6' (pen.); Taremi 25'; Torabi 29'; Ansarifard 68', 90+1'; Azmoun 87' | Report | | Stadium: Azadi Stadium |

| 16 September 2016 Friendly | Kyrgyzstan | 1–2 | Philippines | Bishkek, Kyrgyzstan |
| | Lux 60' | | Ingreso 43'; Bahadoran 52' | Stadium: Dolen Omurzakov Stadium |

| 6 October 2016 Friendly | Kyrgyzstan | 0–0 | Lebanon | Bishkek, Kyrgyzstan |
| | | | | Stadium: Dolen Omurzakov Stadium; Referee: Aleksandr Gauzer (Kazakhstan) |

| 11 October 2016 Friendly | Kyrgyzstan | 1–0 | Turkmenistan | Bishkek, Kyrgyzstan |
| | Kozubaev 77' | Report | | Stadium: Dolen Omurzakov Stadium; Referee: Aleksandr Gauzer (Kazakhstan) |

| 9 November 2016 Friendly | Philippines | 1–0 | Kyrgyzstan | Manila, Philippines |
| | Bahadoran 65' | | | Stadium: Rizal Memorial Stadium |

| 15 November 2016 Friendly | Bahrain | 0–0 | Kyrgyzstan | Riffa, Bahrain |
| | | | | Stadium: Bahrain National Stadium |

==== 2017 ====
| 28 March 2017 2019 AFC ACQ | Kyrgyzstan | 1–0 | Macau | Bishkek, Kyrgyzstan |
| 19:30 KGT (UTC+6) | Baymatov 70' | Report | | Stadium: Dolen Omurzakov Stadium; Attendance: 10,600; Referee: Masoud Tufayelieh (Syria) |

| 13 June 2017 2019 AFC ACQ | India | 1–0 | Kyrgyzstan | Bangalore, India |
| 21:00 KGT (UTC+6) | Chhetri 69' | Report | | Stadium: Sree Kanteerava Stadium; Attendance: 6,213; Referee: Yudai Yamamoto (Japan) |

| 10 October 2017 2019 AFC ACQ | Myanmar | 2–2 | Kyrgyzstan | Yangon, Myanmar |
| 17:30 KGT (UTC+6) | Aung Thu 52'; Kyaw Ko Ko 90+2' | Report | Zemlianukhin 9' (pen.); Maier 49' | Stadium: Thuwunna Stadium; Referee: Ali Abdulnabi (Bahrain) |

| 14 November 2017 2019 AFC ACQ | Macau | 3–4 | Kyrgyzstan | Macau |
| KGT (UTC+6) | Chan Pak Chun 72'; Torrão 79' (pen.); Fernandes 87' | Report | Zemlianukhin 25' (pen.), 55'; Lux 36'; Murzaev 84' | Stadium: Estádio Campo Desportivo; Referee: Võ Minh Trí (Vietnam) |

==== 2018 ====
| 22 March 2018 2019 AFC ACQ | Kyrgyzstan | 5–1 | Myanmar | Incheon, South Korea |
| 12:00 KGT (UTC+6) | Shamshiev 2'; Zemlianukhin 5', 63'; Lux 74'; Sagynbaev 87' | Report | Kyaw Zin Htet 83' | Stadium: Incheon Football Stadium (Note: On 24 November 2017, the AFC announced that the match will be played on 22 March 2018 at a neutral venue, with the Football Federation of the Kyrgyz Republic covering all the costs of the Myanmar team and of the match organisation, including airfares and accommodation. The two Member Associations will be requested to agree on the neutral venue, and if they fail to reach a consensus the AFC will make the appointment.); Attendance: 1,068; Referee: Sukhbir Singh (Singapore) |
Note: Match rearranged from 5 September 2017.

| 27 March 2018 2019 AFC ACQ | Kyrgyzstan | 2–1 | India | Bishkek, Kyrgyzstan |
| 20:00 KGT (UTC+6) | Zemlianukhin 2'; Murzaev 72' | Report | Lalpekhlua 87' | Stadium: Dolen Omurzakov Stadium; Attendance: 9,588; Referee: Ammar Al-Jeneibi (United Arab Emirates) |

| 29 May 2018 Friendly | Azerbaijan | 3–0 | Kyrgyzstan | Baku, Azerbaijan |
| 22:00 KGT (UTC+6) | Medvedev 17'; Madatov 75'; Abbasov 83' | Report | | Stadium: Baku Olympic Stadium; Referee: Ali Palabıyık (Turkey) |

| 6 September 2018 Friendly | Kyrgyzstan | 1–1 | Palestine | Bishkek, Kyrgyzstan |
| 21:00 KGT (UTC+6) | Murzaev 2' | Report | Dabbagh 39' | Stadium: Dolen Omurzakov Stadium; Attendance: 5,200; Referee: Aleksandr Aliyev (Kazakhstan) |

| 10 September 2018 Friendly | Kyrgyzstan | 2–1 | Syria | Bishkek, Kyrgyzstan |
| 20:00 KGT (UTC+6) | Zhyrgalbek Uulu 77'; Sagynbaev 87' | Report | Al Soma 81' (pen.) | Stadium: Dolen Omurzakov Stadium; Attendance: 7,000; Referee: Aleksandr Aliyev (Kazakhstan) |

| 16 October 2018 Friendly | Malaysia | 0–1 | Kyrgyzstan | Malacca, Malaysia |
| 18:45 KGT (UTC+6) | | Report | Sagynbaev 68' | Stadium: Hang Jebat Stadium; Attendance: 6,196; Referee: Suhaizi Shukri (Malaysia) |

| 20 November 2018 Friendly | Japan | 4–0 | Kyrgyzstan | Toyota, Japan |
| 16:20 KGT (UTC+6) | Yamanaka 2'; Haraguchi 19'; Osako 72'; Nakajima 73' | Report | | Stadium: Toyota Stadium; Attendance: 38,353; Referee: Ilgiz Tantashev (Uzbekistan) |

| 20 December 2018 Friendly | Jordan | 0–1 | Kyrgyzstan | Doha, Qatar |
| 21:00 KGT (UTC+6) | | Report | Rustamov 86' | Stadium: Suheim bin Hamad Stadium; Referee: Saoud Ali Al-Adba (Qatar) |

| 25 December 2018 Friendly | Qatar | 1–0 | Kyrgyzstan | Doha, Qatar |
| 23:00 KGT (UTC+6) | Al. Afif 69' | Report | | Stadium: Khalifa International Stadium |

==== 2019 ====
| 7 January 2019 2019 AFC AC | China | 2–1 | Kyrgyzstan | Al Ain, United Arab Emirates |
| 17:00 KGT (UTC+6) | Matyash 50' (o.g.); Yu Dabao 78' | Report | Israilov 42' | Stadium: Sheikh Khalifa International Stadium; Attendance: 1,839; Referee: Mohammed Abdulla Hassan Mohamed (United Arab Emirates) |

| 11 January 2019 2019 AFC AC | Kyrgyzstan | 0–1 | South Korea | Al Ain, United Arab Emirates |
| 22:00 KGT (UTC+6) | | Report | Kim Min-jae 41' | Stadium: Hazza bin Zayed Stadium; Attendance: 4,893; Referee: Khamis Al-Marri (Qatar) |

| 16 January 2019 2019 AFC AC | Kyrgyzstan | 3–1 | Philippines | Dubai, United Arab Emirates |
| 19:30 KGT (UTC+6) | Lux 24', 51', 77' | Report | Schröck 80' | Stadium: Rashid Stadium; Attendance: 4,217; Referee: Turki Al-Khudhayr (Saudi Arabia) |

| 21 January 2019 2019 AFC AC | United Arab Emirates | 3–2 (a.e.t.) | Kyrgyzstan | Abu Dhabi, United Arab Emirates |
| 23:00 KGT (UTC+6) | Esmaeel 14'; Mabkhout 64'; Khalil 103' (pen.) | Report | Murzaev 26'; Rustamov 90+1' | Stadium: Zayed Sports City Stadium; Attendance: 17,784; Referee: Fu Ming (China PR) |

| 11 June 2019 Friendly | Kyrgyzstan | 2–2 | Palestine | Bishkek, Kyrgyzstan |
| 20:00 KGT (UTC+6) | Rustamov 31'; Murzaev 49' | Report | Seyam 57'; Bahdari 88' (pen.) | Stadium: Dolen Omurzakov Stadium; Referee: Artyom Kuchin (Kazakhstan) |

| 5 September 2019 2022 WCQ | Tajikistan | 1–0 | Kyrgyzstan | Dushanbe, Tajikistan |
| 20:00 KGT (UTC+6) | A. Dzhalilov 41' | Report (FIFA); Report (AFC) | | Stadium: Pamir Stadium; Attendance: 18,700; Referee: Adham Makhadmeh (Jordan) |

| 10 October 2019 2022 WCQ | Kyrgyzstan | 7–0 | Myanmar | Bishkek, Kyrgyzstan |
| 20:30 KGT (UTC+6) | Bernhardt 5', 10', 87' (pen.); Shukurov 20', 71'; Alykulov 26'; Kichin 45' | Report (FIFA); Report (AFC) | | Stadium: Dolen Omurzakov Stadium; Attendance: 13,000; Referee: Omar Mohamed Al-Ali (United Arab Emirates) |

| 15 October 2019 2022 WCQ | Mongolia | 1–2 | Kyrgyzstan | Ulaanbaatar, Mongolia |
| 14:00 KGT (UTC+6) | Tsedenbal 57' (pen.) | Report | Alykulov 13'; Murzaev 42' | Stadium: MFF Football Centre; Referee: Hussein Abo Yehia (Lebanon) |

| 9 November 2019 Friendly | Uzbekistan | 3–1 | Kyrgyzstan | Tashkent, Uzbekistan |
| 18:00 KGT (UTC+6) | Sergeev 11'; Khamdamov 53'; Iskanderov 80' | Report | Musabekov 30' | Stadium: Pakhtakor Stadium; Attendance: 11,000; Referee: Bastian Dankert (Germany) |

| 14 November 2019 2022 WCQ | Kyrgyzstan | 0–2 | Japan | Bishkek, Kyrgyzstan |
| 17:15 KGT (UTC+6) | | Report (FIFA); Report (AFC) | Minamino 41' (pen.); Haraguchi 54' | Stadium: Dolen Omurzakov Stadium; Attendance: 17,543; Referee: Mohammed Al-Hoish (Saudi Arabia) |

| 19 November 2019 2022 WCQ | Kyrgyzstan | 1–1 | Tajikistan | Bishkek, Kyrgyzstan |
| 20:00 KGT (UTC+6) | Kozubaev 83' | Report (FIFA); Report (AFC) | Ergashev 17' | Stadium: Dolen Omurzakov Stadium; Attendance: 15,843; Referee: Abdulrahman Al-Jassim (Qatar) |

=== 2020–2029 ===
| Type | GP | W | D | L | GF | GA |
|---|---|---|---|---|---|---|
| Friendly Matches | 6 | 2 | 0 | 4 | 8 | 11 |
| 2022 FIFA World Cup qualification | 3 | 1 | 0 | 2 | 9 | 7 |
| 2021 Three Nations Cup | 2 | 2 | 0 | 0 | 5 | 1 |
| 2022 Navruz Cup | 2 | 0 | 0 | 2 | 1 | 4 |
| 2023 AFC Asian Cup qualification | 3 | 2 | 1 | 0 | 4 | 1 |
| 2023 Tri-Nation Series | 2 | 0 | 1 | 1 | 1 | 3 |
| 2023 CAFA Nations Cup | 3 | 1 | 0 | 2 | 4 | 6 |
| Total | 21 | 8 | 2 | 11 | 32 | 33 |

==== 2020 ====
| 25 March 2020 Friendly | Vietnam | v | Kyrgyzstan | Bình Dương, Vietnam |
| KGT (UTC+6) | | Report | | Stadium: Gò Đậu Stadium |

==== 2021 ====
| 25 March 2021 Friendly | Kazakhstan | v | Kyrgyzstan | Nur-Sultan, Kazakhstan |
| KGT (UTC+6) | | Report | | Stadium: Astana Arena |

| 7 June 2021 2022 FWCQ R2 | Kyrgyzstan | 0–1 | Mongolia | Osaka, Japan |
| 13:00 KGT (UTC+6) | | Report | Mijiddorj 34' | Stadium: Yanmar Stadium Nagai; Referee: Yu Ming-hsun (Chinese Taipei) |

| 11 June 2021 2022 FWCQ R2 | Myanmar | 1–8 | Kyrgyzstan | Osaka, Japan |
| 13:00 KGT (UTC+6) | Hlaing Bo Bo 69' | Report | Rustamov 22'; Alykulov 29'; Musabekov 34'; Shukurov 45'; Murzaev 45+2', 61', 78'; Bokoleyev 63' | Stadium: Yanmar Stadium Nagai; Referee: Hussein Abou Yehya (Lebanon) |

| 15 June 2021 2022 FWCQ R2 | Japan | 5–1 | Kyrgyzstan | Suita, Japan |
| 16:25 KGT (UTC+6) | Onaiwu 27' (pen.), 31', 33'; Sasaki 72'; Asano 77' | Report | Murzaev 45+2' (pen.) | Stadium: Panasonic Stadium; Referee: Omar Al-Yaqoubi (Oman) |

| 2 September 2021 Three Nations Cup | Kyrgyzstan | 1–0 | Palestine | Bishkek, Kyrgyzstan |
| 20:30 KGT (UTC+6) | Azarov 26' | Report | Darwish (yellow card) | Stadium: Dolen Omurzakov Stadium; Attendance: 14,500; Referee: Akhrol Riskullaev (Uzbekistan) |

| 7 September 2021 Three Nations Cup | Kyrgyzstan | 4–1 | Bangladesh | Bishkek, Kyrgyzstan |
| 20:30 KGT (UTC+6) | Moldozhunusov 10'; Shukurov 39'; Rustamov 46'; Duyshobekov 89' | Report | Sufil 53' | Stadium: Dolen Omurzakov Stadium; Attendance: 14,000; Referee: Rustam Lutfullin (Uzbekistan) |

| 11 November 2021 Friendly | Kyrgyzstan | 2–1 | Singapore | Sharjah, United Arab Emirates |
| 20:00 KGT (UTC+6) | Akmatov 3'; Batyrkanov 9' | Report | Sulaiman 21' | Stadium: Al Hamriya Sports Club Stadium; Referee: Yahya Ali Al Mulla (United Arab Emirates) |

| 16 November 2021 Friendly | Bahrain | 4–2 | Kyrgyzstan | Riffa, Bahrain |
| 22:00 KGT (UTC+6) | Madan 23'; Marhoon 45+1', 50'; Al Aswad 71' | Report | Kichin 16' (pen.); Abdurakhmanov 24' | Stadium: Bahrain National Stadium |

==== 2022 ====
| 25 March 2022 Navruz Cup | Uzbekistan | 3–1 | Kyrgyzstan | Namangan, Uzbekistan |
| 20:00 UTC+6 | Shomurodov 64'; Sergeyev 85', 90' | Report | Murzayev 6' |

| 29 March 2022 Navruz Cup | Tajikistan | 1–0 | Kyrgyzstan | Namangan, Uzbekistan |
| 16:30 UTC+6 | Umarbayev 54' | Report | | Referee: R. Lutfullin |

| 8 June 2022 AFC AC Q | Kyrgyzstan | 2–1 | Singapore | Bishkek, Kyrgyzstan |
| --:-- UTC+6 | Kichin 77' (pen.); Maier 82' | Report | Song Ui-young 57' | Stadium: Dolen Omurzakov Stadium; Attendance: 7,322; Referee: Feras Taweel (Syria) |

| 11 June 2022 AFC AC Q | Myanmar | 0–2 | Kyrgyzstan | Bishkek, Kyrgyzstan |
| --:-- UTC+6 | | Report | Maier 25', 45' | Stadium: Dolen Omurzakov Stadium; Attendance: 7,522; Referee: Rowan Arumughan (India) |

| 14 June 2022 AFC AC Q | Kyrgyzstan | 0–0 | Tajikistan | Bishkek, Kyrgyzstan |
| --:-- UTC+6 | | Report | | Stadium: Dolen Omurzakov Stadium; Attendance: 17,340; Referee: Ko Hyung-jin (South Korea) |

| 24 September 2022 Friendly | Kyrgyzstan | 1–2 | Russia | Bishkek, Kyrgyzstan |
| 20:00 UTC+6 | Shukurov 24' | Report | Sobolev 30' (pen.); Utkin 89' | Stadium: Dolen Omurzakov Stadium; Referee: Daniyar Sakhi (Kazakhstan) |

==== 2023 ====
| 25 March 2023 2023 Tri-Nation Series | Myanmar | 1–1 | Kyrgyzstan | Imphal, India |
| 18:00 UTC+5:30 | Aung Thu 82' | Report | Zhyrgalbek uulu 90+6' | Stadium: Khuman Lampak Main Stadium; Attendance: 9,563; Referee: Nasir Uddin (Bangladesh) |

| 28 March 2023 2023 Tri-Nation Series | India | 2–0 | Kyrgyzstan | Imphal, India |
| 18:00 UTC+5:30 | Jhingan 34'; Chhetri 84' (pen.) | Report | | Stadium: Khuman Lampak Main Stadium; Attendance: 29,877; Referee: Md Alamgir Sarker (Bangladesh) |

| 10 June 2023 2023 CAFA Nations Cup | Kyrgyzstan | 3–0; Awarded | Afghanistan 'B' | Bishkek, Kyrgyzstan |
| | Batyrkanov 90+7' | | | Stadium: Dolen Omurzakov Stadium; Referee: Sadullo Gulmurodi (Tajikistan) |
Note: The match was abandoned in the 97th minute with Kyrgyzstan leading 1–0 after Afghanistan walked off and refused to continue. The match was awarded 3–0 to Kyrgyzstan.

| 16 June 2023 2023 CAFA Nations Cup | Kyrgyzstan | 1–5 | Iran | Bishkek, Kyrgyzstan |
| | Murzayev 52' | | Taremi 34', 39' (pen.), 56'; Azmoun 66', 79' | Stadium: Dolen Omurzakov Stadium; Referee: Akhrol Riskullaev (Uzbekistan) |

| 20 June 2023 2023 CAFA Nations Cup | Kyrgyzstan | 0–1 | Oman | Tashkent, Uzbekistan |
| | | | | Stadium: Pakhtakor Central Stadium |

| 11 September Friendly | Kuwait | 1–3 | Kyrgyzstan | Dubai, United Arab Emirates |
| 21:00 UTC+4 | Abdullah 26' | Report | Alykulov 43'; Kojo 70', 88' | Stadium: The Sevens Stadium |

| 12 October 2023 Friendly | Bahrain | 2–0 | Kyrgyzstan | Manama, Bahrain |
| | | | | Stadium: Al Ahli Stadium |

| 15 October 2023 Friendly | Kyrgyzstan | 0–1 | Philippines | Arad, Bahrain |
| | | | Menzi | Stadium: Al Muharraq Stadium |

| 16 November 2023 2026 World Cup qualification | Malaysia | 4–3 | Kyrgyzstan | Kuala Lumpur, Malaysia |
| 21:00 UTC+8 | Cools 7', 77'; Brauzman 72' (o.g.); Faisal 90+3' | Report | Zhyrgalbek uulu 42'; Batyrkanov 44'; Merk 57' | Stadium: Bukit Jalil National Stadium; Attendance: 17,142; Referee: Ammar Mahfoodh (Bahrain) |

| 21 November 2023 2026 World Cup qualification | Kyrgyzstan | 1–0 | Oman | Bishkek, Kyrgyzstan |
| | Abdurakhmanov 49' | Report | | Stadium: Dolen Omurzakov Stadium; Attendance: 19,000; Referee: Mooud Bonyadifard (Iran) |

==== 2024 ====
| 5 January 2024 Friendly | Syria | 1–1 | Kyrgyzstan | Dubai, United Arab Emirates |
| 20:30 UTC+6 | Kurdaghli (red card) 59'; Hesar 71' | Report | Akmatov 48' | Stadium: Maktoum bin Rashid Al Maktoum Stadium |

| 9 January Friendly | Kyrgyzstan | 2–1 | Vietnam | Doha, Qatar |
| 19:00 UTC+6 | Kojo 31'; Akmatov 75' | Report | Trương Tiến Anh 63' | Stadium: Al Egla Training Facility Field |

| 16 January 2023 AFC Asian Cup GS | Thailand | 2–0 | Kyrgyzstan | Doha, Qatar |
| 20:30 UTC+6 | Supachai 26', 49' | Report | | Stadium: Abdullah bin Khalifa Stadium; Attendance: 4,530; Referee: Adham Makhadmeh (Jordan) |

| 21 January 2023 AFC Asian Cup GS | Kyrgyzstan | 0–2 | Saudi Arabia | Al Rayyan, Qatar |
| 23:30 UTC+6 | | Report | Kanno 35'; Al-Ghamdi 84' | Stadium: Ahmad bin Ali Stadium; Attendance: 39,557; Referee: Jumpei Iida (Japan) |

| 25 January 2023 AFC Asian Cup GS | Kyrgyzstan | 1–1 | Oman | Doha, Qatar |
| 21:00 UTC+6 | Kojo 80' | Report | Al-Ghassani 8' | Stadium: Abdullah bin Khalifa Stadium; Attendance: 6,231; Referee: Ahmad Al-Ali (Kuwait) |

| 21 March 2026 World Cup qualification 2R | Chinese Taipei | 0–2 | Kyrgyzstan | Kaohsiung, Taiwan |
| 14:00 UTC+6 | | Report | Kichin 54' (pen.); Ka.Merk 80' | Stadium: Kaohsiung Nanzih Football Stadium; Attendance: 1,028; Referee: Yahya Al-Mulla (United Arab Emirates) |

| 26 March 2026 World Cup qualification 2R | Kyrgyzstan | 5–1 | Chinese Taipei | Bishkek, Kyrgyzstan |
| 20:00 UTC+6 | Kojo 17', 38', 45'; Brauzman 79'; Ki. Merk 90+5' | Report | Wu Yen-shu 87' (pen.) | Stadium: Dolen Omurzakov Stadium; Attendance: 13,657; Referee: Ammar Mahfoodh (Bahrain) |

| 6 June 2026 World Cup qualification 2R | Kyrgyzstan | 1–1 | Malaysia | Bishkek, Kyrgyzstan |
| 21:00 UTC+6 | Alykulov 24' | Report (FIFA); Report (AFC) | Abdurakhmanov 38' (o.g.) | Stadium: Dolen Omurzakov Stadium; Attendance: 14,135; Referee: Adham Makhadmeh (Jordan) |

| 11 June 2026 World Cup qualification 2R | Oman | 1–1 | Kyrgyzstan | Muscat, Oman |
| | | Report | | Stadium: Sultan Qaboos Sports Complex |

| 30 August Friendly | Kyrgyzstan | 0–0 | (Algeria) MC Oran | Izmit, Turkey |
| | | | | Stadium: İhsaniye Stadium |

| 5 September 2026 World Cup qualification | Iran | 1–0 | Kyrgyzstan | Fuladshahr, Iran |
| 19:30 UTC+3:30 | Taremi 34' | | | Stadium: Fuladshahr Stadium; Referee: Yusuke Araki (Japan) |

| 10 September 2026 World Cup qualification | Kyrgyzstan | 2–3 | Uzbekistan | Bishkek, Kyrgyzstan |
| 20:00 UTC+6 | Kojo 15'; Abdurakhmanov 35' | | Shomurodov 17'; Aliqulov 45'; Urunov 72' | Stadium: Dolen Omurzakov Stadium; Attendance: 13,282; Referee: Ahmed Al-Alili (Kuwait) |

== Non-International matches ==
| 23 August 1992 Friendly | Uzbekistan | 3–0 | Kyrgyzstan | Tashkent, Uzbekistan |
| KGT (UTC+6) | Maxudov 59'; Abduraimov 62' (pen.), 64' (pen.) | | | Attendance: 1,000; Referee: K. Partsalis (Turkmenistan) |

| 26 August 1992 Friendly | Kyrgyzstan | 1–1 | Kazakhstan | Bishkek, Kyrgyzstan |
| KGT (UTC+6) | S.Bondarenko 75' | | Aubakirov 60' | Stadium: Spartak Stadium; Attendance: 2,000; Referee: A. Blinkov (Uzbekistan) |

| 3 October 1992 Friendly | Kyrgyzstan | 2–6 | Uzbekistan | Bishkek, Kyrgyzstan |
| KGT (UTC+6) | A.Momunov 35' (pen.); Kazmirchuk 65' | | Zabirov 13'; Abdullaev 22'; Abduraimov 30', 44' (pen.); Maksudov 74'; Ruzimov 79' | Stadium: Spartak Stadium; Attendance: 2,000; Referee: A. Borisov (Kazakhstan) |

| 14 October 1992 Friendly | Turkmenistan | 4–0 | Kyrgyzstan | Ashgabat, Turkmenistan |
| KGT (UTC+6) | Kirillov 12' (pen.); K. Durdyev 43'; Ch. Mukhadov 50'; K. Meredov 87' | | | Stadium: Köpetdag Stadium; Attendance: 1,000; Referee: G. Ismailov (Uzbekistan) |

| 25 October 1992 Friendly | Kazakhstan | 2–0 | Kyrgyzstan | Kyzylorda, Kazakhstan |
| KGT (UTC+6) | Kurgan 35', 35' | | | Attendance: 2,000; Referee: K. Partsalis (Turkmenistan) |

| 7 June 1993 1993 ECO Cup GS | Azerbaijan | 3–2 | Kyrgyzstan | Tehran, Iran |
| KGT (UTC+6) | Lukin 43', 63'; Rzayev 30' | Report | Kovalenko 40'; K.Ishenbaev 76' | Stadium: Azadi Stadium; Attendance: 5,000; Referee: (Iran) |

| 8 June 1993 1993 ECO Cup GS | Tajikistan | 1–1 | Kyrgyzstan | Tehran, Iran |
| KGT (UTC+6) | Muminov 85' | [ Report] | K.Ishenbaev 78' | Stadium: Azadi Stadium; Attendance: 3,000; Referee: (Iran) |

| 17 February 2010 2010 AFC CC | India | 1–2 | Kyrgyzstan | Colombo, Sri Lanka |
| KGT (UTC+6) | Franco 58' (pen.) | Report | I. Amirov 15'; Zemlianukhin 32' | Stadium: Sugathadasa Stadium; Attendance: 800; Referee: Nawaf Abdulla Ghayyath (Bahrain) |

| 7 June 2013 Friendly | Bahrain | 1–3 | Kyrgyzstan | Riffa, Bahrain |
| 20:30 KGT (UTC+6) | 90' | Report | Murzaev 62', 77'; A.Israilov 85' | Stadium: Bahrain National Stadium |

| 11 October 2013 Friendly | Kyrgyzstan | 3–0 | Kuwait | Bishkek, Kyrgyzstan |
| 16:00 KGT (UTC+6) | Kichin 5', 59'; Murzaev 62' | Report | Al Harbi (red card) 45' | Stadium: Spartak Stadium |

| 15 October 2013 Friendly | Kyrgyzstan | 1–4 | Tajikistan | Bishkek, Kyrgyzstan |
| 16:00 KGT (UTC+6) | A.Israilov 47' | Report | Davronov 6'; Vasiev 28'; Tohirov 32'; Suvonkulov 40' | Stadium: Spartak Stadium; Attendance: 5,000; Referee: Anatoly Vishnichenko (Kazakhstan) |

| 13 December 2014 Friendly | China | 4–0 | Kyrgyzstan | Shenzhen, China |
| 17:35 KGT (UTC+6) | Zheng Zhi 20'; Wu Lei 34'; Yang Xu 54', 79' | Report | | Stadium: Bao'an Stadium |

| 17 December 2014 Friendly | China | 2–0 | Kyrgyzstan | Shenzhen, China |
| KGT (UTC+6) | Gao Lin 75'; Yang Xu (yellow card) 81' | Report | | Stadium: Bao'an Stadium |

| 25 August 2017 Friendly | Uzbekistan | 5–0 | Kyrgyzstan | Tashkent, Uzbekistan |
| 18:00 UZT (UTC+5) | | | | Stadium: Bunyodkor Stadium |

| 2 December 2017 2017 AWSTC | Kyrgyzstan | 3–0 | Mongolia | Banda Aceh, Indonesia |
| 15:00 KGT (UTC+6) | Zemlianukhin 14', 65'; Saarbekov 56' | Report | | Stadium: Harapan Bangsa Stadium; Referee: Thoriq Al-Katiri (Indonesia) |

| 4 December 2017 2017 AWSTC | Brunei | 0–4 | Kyrgyzstan | Banda Aceh, Indonesia |
| 15:00 KGT (UTC+6) | | | Zemlianukhin 1'; Baymatov 32', 54' (pen.); Saarbekov 59' | Stadium: Harapan Bangsa Stadium; Referee: Oki Dwi Putra (Indonesia) |

| 6 December 2017 2017 AWSTC | Kyrgyzstan | 1–0 | Indonesia | Banda Aceh, Indonesia |
| 15:00 KGT (UTC+6) | Askarbek 20' | | | Stadium: Harapan Bangsa Stadium; Referee: Mustafa Umarela (Indonesia) |

| 31 December 2018 Friendly | Kyrgyzstan | 2–1 | Palestine | Doha, Qatar |
| 18:00 KGT (UTC+6) | 35'; 63' (pen.) | | Islame 75' (pen.) |
