= Talant Samsaliev =

Kyrgyzstani footballer

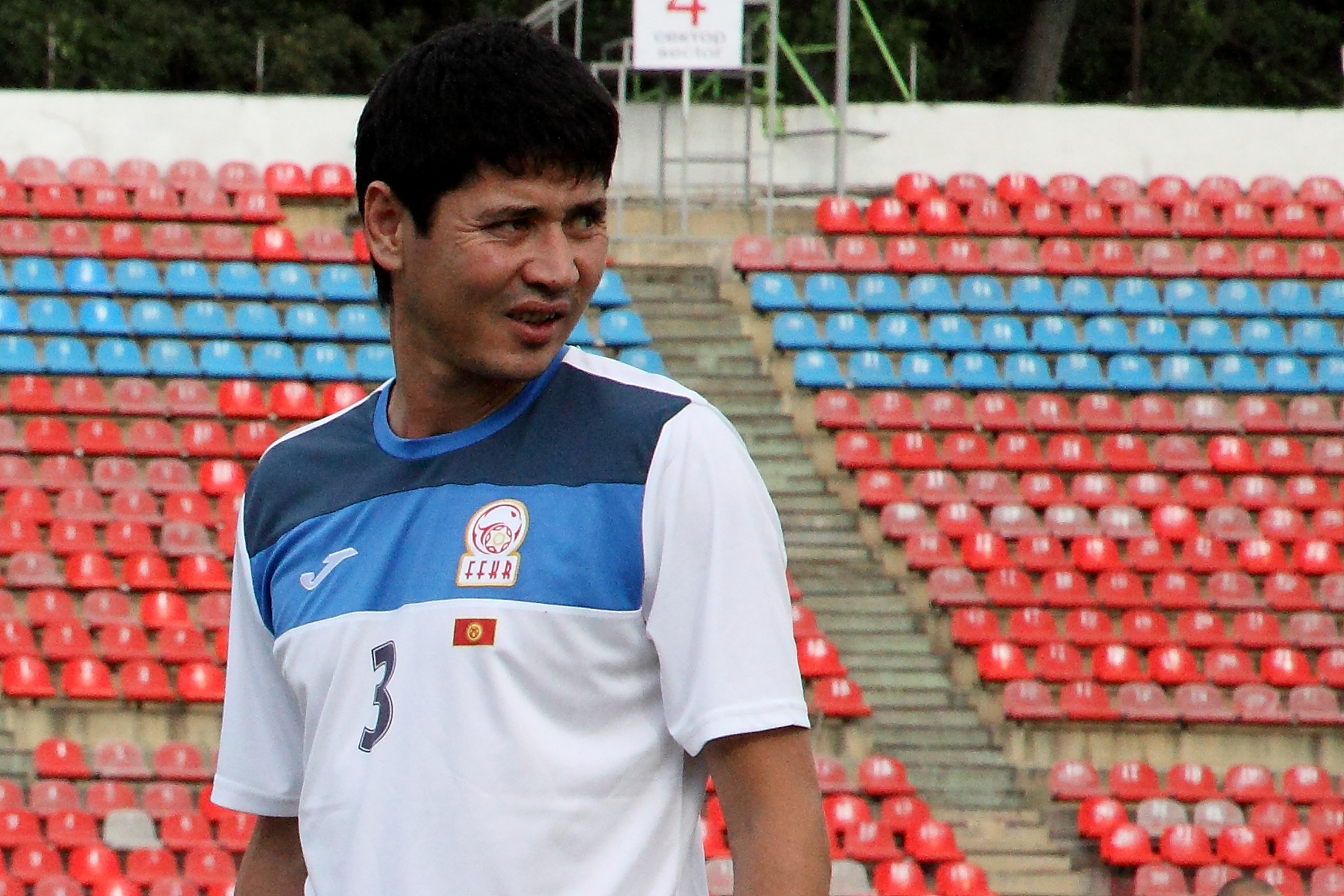
- Samsaliev with Kyrgyzstan in 2015

Personal information
- Full name: Talant Avkalievich Samsaliev
- Date of birth: 27 April 1980 (age 46)
- Place of birth: Soviet Union
- Height: 1.85 m (6 ft 1 in)
- Position: Defender

Senior career*
Years	Team	Apps	(Gls)
2000–2001	CAG-Dinamo-MVD Bishkek	26	(1)
2001–2017	Dordoi Bishkek		

International career^{‡}
2003–2015	Kyrgyzstan	35	(1)
- * Club domestic league appearances and goals as of 3 December 2017 ‡ National team caps and goals as of 3 December 2017

Talant Samsaliev (Kyrgyz: Талант Самсалиев; born 27 April 1980) is a retired Kyrgyzstani International footballer who played the majority of his career for Dordoi Bishkek.

== Career ==
On 21 October 2017, Samsaliev played his last professional match against Khimik Kara-Balta, during his time with Dordoi Bishkek he made 393 appearances and scored 23 goals in all competitions.

== Career stats ==
=== International ===
Kyrgyzstan national team
Year	Apps	Goals
2003	1	0
2004	6	0
2006	7	0
2007	9	1
2008	3	0
2009	1	0
2011	3	0
2013	5	0
2015	2	0
Total	35	1

Statistics accurate as of match played 12 November 2015

=== International Goals ===
#	Date	Venue	Opponent	Score	Result	Competition
1.	19 August 2007	New Delhi, India	Cambodia	4–3	Won	Nehru Cup 2007

== Honours ==
=== Club ===
Dordoi Bishkek

- Kyrgyzstan League Winner (9): 2004, 2005, 2006, 2007, 2008, 2009, 2011, 2012, 2014
- Kyrgyzstan Cup Winner (6): 2004, 2005, 2006, 2008, 2010, 2012, 2014
- Kyrgyzstan Super Cup Winner (3): 2011, 2012, 2013, 2014
- AFC President's Cup Winner (2): 2006, 2007
