= Sergey Chikishev =

Kyrgyzstani footballer

Personal information
- Full name: Sergey Chikishev
- Date of birth: 29 July 1984 (age 42)
- Place of birth: Soviet Union
- Height: 1.75 m (5 ft 9 in)
- Position: Defender

Senior career*
Years	Team	Apps	(Gls)
2002–2004	RUOR-Guardia Bishkek	80	(53)
2005–2007	Dordoi-Dynamo Naryn		(11)
2007–2009	Sher-Ak-Dan Bishkek		(4)

International career^{‡}
2003–2010	Kyrgyzstan	12	(3)
- * Club domestic league appearances and goals as of 13 October 2015 ‡ National team caps and goals as of 13 October 2015

Sergey Chikishev (born 29 July 1984) is a Kyrgyzstani footballer who plays as a defender.

== Career statistics ==
=== International ===
Kyrgyzstan national team
Year	Apps	Goals
2003	2	2
2004	4	1
2009	5	0
2010	1	0
Total	12	3

Statistics accurate as of match played 21 February 2010

=== International goals ===
Score and Result lists Kyrgyzstan goals first

#	Date	Venue	Opponent	Score	Result	Competition
1.	29 November 2003	People's Football Stadium, Karachi, Pakistan	Pakistan	2–0	2–0	2006 World Cup Qualifiers
2.	3 December 2003	Spartak Stadium, Bishkek, Kyrgyzstan	Pakistan	1–0	4–0	2006 World Cup Qualifiers
3.	13 October 2004	Pamir Stadium, Dushanbe, Tajikistan	Tajikistan	1–2	1–2	2006 World Cup Qualifiers

== Honours ==
Dordoi-Dynamo Naryn

- Kyrgyzstan League (3): 2005, 2006, 2007
- Kyrgyzstan Cup (2): 2005, 2006
