= Vladislav Volkov (Kyrgyzstani footballer) =

Kyrgyzstani footballer

Personal information
- Full name: Vladislav Andreyevich Volkov
- Date of birth: 15 August 1980 (age 46)
- Place of birth: Kyrgyzstan
- Height: 1.85 m (6 ft 1 in)
- Position: Goalkeeper

Senior career*
Years	Team	Apps	(Gls)
2002	Dordoi Naryn	6	(0)
2002–2004	RUOR-Guardia Bishkek	72	(0)
2005–2013	Dordoi Bishkek		
2013–2014	Khayr Vahdat		
2014–2015	Dordoi Bishkek		
2016	Ala-Too Naryn	4	(0)
2016	Sumida Ulaanbaatar		

International career^{‡}
2006–2014	Kyrgyzstan	16	(0)
- * Club domestic league appearances and goals as of 1 September 2023 ‡ National team caps and goals as of 15 June 2018

Vladislav Andreyevich Volkov (born 15 August 1980) in Kyrgyzstan is a footballer who plays as a goalkeeper. He last played for FC Sumida Ulaanbaatar in the Mongolia. Also he was a Kyrgyzstan national football team player.

== Career ==
In August 2013, Volkov moved to Tajik League side Khayr Vahdat FK.

== Honors ==
=== Club ===
Dordoi Bishkek

- Shoro Top League (7): 2005, 2006, 2007, 2008, 2009, 2011, 2012
- Kyrgyzstan Cup (5): 2005, 2006, 2008, 2010, 2012
- Kyrgyzstan Super Cup (2): 2012, 2013
- AFC President's Cup (2): 2006, 2007
