= Pavel Matyash =

Kyrgyz footballer (born 1987)

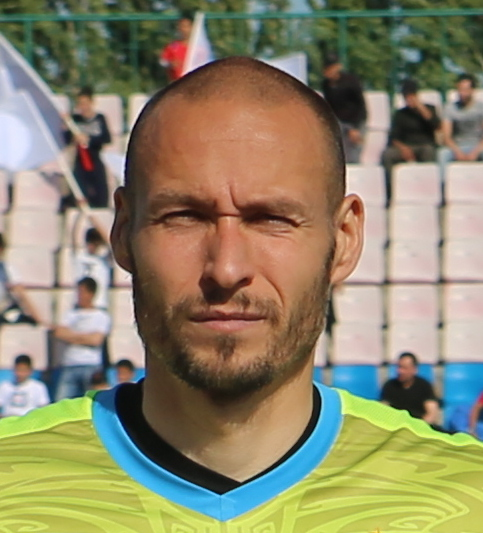

Personal information
- Full name: Pavel Viktorovich Matyash
- Date of birth: 11 July 1987 (age 39)
- Place of birth: Frunze, Kirghiz SSR, Soviet Union
- Height: 1.97 m (6 ft 5 1/2 in)
- Position: Goalkeeper

Team information
- Current team: Alga Bishkek
- Number: 33

Senior career*
Years	Team	Apps	(Gls)
2006–2014	Dordoi Bishkek	110	(0)
2015	Alga Bishkek		
2015	Maziya	8	(0)
2016	UiTM	12	(0)
2017	Maziya		
2018	AGMK	15	(0)
2019	Dordoi Bishkek		
2020–2022	Alga Bishkek	42	(0)

International career^{‡}
2004	Kyrgyzstan U21	28	(0)
2009–	Kyrgyzstan	46	(0)
- * Club domestic league appearances and goals as of 15 October 2019 ‡ National team caps and goals as of 15 June 2021

Pavel Viktorovich Matyash (Russian: Павел Викторович Матяш; born 11 July 1987) is a Kyrgyzstani footballer who plays for FC Alga Bishkek of the Kyrgyz Premier League and the Kyrgyzstan national football team.

== Career ==
Matyash started his career as a third-string goalkeeper for Dordoi Bishkek, appearing in cup matches.

In July 2015, Matyash signed for Maldivian side Maziya S&RC on a contract until 12 November 2015, with the option of an extension. In February 2016, Matyash signed a one-year contract with Malaysian UiTM FC.

On 5 December 2018, FC Dordoi Bishkek announced that Matyash had re-joined their club, signing alongside Anton Zemlianukhin and Azamat Baymatov. In January 2020, he returned to FC Alga Bishkek.

=== International ===
P. Matyash have played for Kyrgyzstan since 2009. In 7/1/2019, he became the first ever goalkeeper to score an own goal in Asian Cup history, then Kyrgyzstan lost 1–2.

== Name ==
Matyash's last name (Матяш in Russian) has multiple ways of being transliterated from its original spelling in the Russian Cyrillic alphabet into the Latin alphabet. Matiash is the spelling used throughout the player's passport and other official documents. It has also been adopted by FIFA and is the preferred spelling in most English publications (although Matyash is also used elsewhere).

== Career statistics ==
=== Club ===
As of 15 February 2024

Club	Season	Division	League		Cup		Continental		Total	
Club	Season	Division	Apps	GA	Apps	GA	Apps	GA	Apps	GA
Kyrgyzstan			League		Kyrgyzstan Cup		AFC		Total	
Kyrgyzstan U-21	2004	Kyrgyzstan League	?	?	?	?	-	-	28	?
Dordoi Bishkek	2006	Kyrgyzstan League	?	?	?	?	?	?	5	1
Dordoi Bishkek	2007	Kyrgyzstan League	?	?	?	?	?	?	13	5
Dordoi Bishkek	2008	Kyrgyzstan League	?	?	?	?	?	?	17	7
Dordoi Bishkek	2009	Kyrgyzstan League	?	?	?	?	?	?	26	15
Dordoi Bishkek	2010	Kyrgyzstan League	?	?	?	?	?	?	24	15
Dordoi Bishkek	2011	Kyrgyzstan League	?	?	?	?	-	-	30	13
Dordoi Bishkek	2012	Kyrgyzstan League	?	?	?	?	-	-	28	10
Dordoi Bishkek	2013	Kyrgyzstan League	?	?	?	?	-	-	21	13
Dordoi Bishkek	2014	Kyrgyzstan League	?	?	?	?	-	-	7	4
Alga Bishkek	2015	Kyrgyzstan League	?	?	?	?	-	-	9	6
Alga Bishkek	2020	Kyrgyzstan League	10	0	?	?	?	?	10	0
Alga Bishkek	2021	Kyrgyzstan League	14	0	?	?	?	?	14	0
Alga Bishkek	2022	Kyrgyzstan League	18	0	?	?	?	?	18	0
Muras United	2023	Kyrgyzstan League	15	0	?	?	?	?	15	0
Maldives		Kyrgyzstan League	League		President's Cup		AFC		Total	
Maziya	2015	Dhivehi Premier League	8	11	5	2	-	-	13	13
Malaysia			League		Malaysia FA Cup		AFC		Total	
UiTM FC	2016	Malaysia Premier League	12	20	1	5	-	-	13	25
Total	Kyrgyzstan		?	?	?	?	?	?	265	?
Total	Maldives		8	11	5	2	-	-	13	13
Total	Malaysia		12	20	1	5	-	-	13	25
Career Total			?	?	?	?	?	?	282	?

=== International ===
Kyrgyzstan
Year	Apps	Goals
2006	1	0
2009	5	0
2013	8	0
2014	7	0
2015	5	0
2016	3	0
2017	3	0
2018	7	0
2019	6	0
2021	1	0
Total	46	0

== Honours ==
Dordoi

- Kyrgyzstan League (5); 2007, 2008, 2009, 2011, 2012
- Kyrgyzstan Cup (3): 2008, 2010, 2012
- Kyrgyzstan Super Cup (3): 2012, 2013, 2014
- AFC President's Cup (2): 2006, 2007
- AFC President's Cup Runner-up (3): 2008, 2009, 2010

Maziya

- President's Cup (Maldives): 2015

Kyrgyzstan

- Nehru Cup 3rd place: 2009

Individual

- Kyrgyzstan League Best goalkeeper (2): 2011, 2013
