= Valery Berezovsky =

Kyrgystani footballer

Personal information
- Full name: Valery Yuryevich Berezovsky
- Date of birth: 23 July 1975 (age 51)
- Place of birth: Bishkek, Kirghiz SSR
- Position: Forward

Senior career*
| Years | Team | Apps | (Gls) |
| 1992–1995 | Alga Bishkek | 83 | (14) |
| 1996 | Astrateks Astrakhan | 31 | (1) |
| 1997 | Alga-PVO Bishkek | 15 | (5) |
| 1998–2000 | SKA-PVO Bishkek | 60 | (40) |
| 2001–2003 | Zhetysu | 60 | (10) |
| 2003 | Esil Bogatyr | 10 | (0) |
| 2004–2007 | Dordoi-Dynamo Naryn | | |
| 2008 | Abdysh-Ata Kant | | |

International career
| 1997–2008 | Kyrgyzstan | 27 | (1) |

Managerial career
- 2019–2022: Kyrgyzstan Women
- * Club domestic league appearances and goals

Valery Yuryevich Berezovsky (Russian: Валерий Юрьевич Березовский; born 23 July 1975) is a retired Kyrgyzstani international football player who played for the Kyrgyzstan national football team.

== Career statistics ==
=== International ===
Kyrgyzstan national team
| Year | Apps | Goals |
|---|---|---|
| 1997 | 3 | 0 |
| 1998 | 0 | 0 |
| 1999 | 2 | 0 |
| 2000 | 3 | 0 |
| 2001 | 6 | 0 |
| 2002 | 0 | 0 |
| 2003 | 0 | 0 |
| 2004 | 6 | 1 |
| 2005 | 0 | 0 |
| 2006 | 1 | 0 |
| 2007 | 4 | 0 |
| 2008 | 2 | 0 |
| Total | 27 | 1 |

Statistics accurate as of match played 9 May 2008

=== International goals ===
Scores and results list Kyrgyzstan's goal tally first.
As of match played 18 February 2004

| # | Date | Venue | Opponent | Score | Result | Competition | Ref. |
|---|---|---|---|---|---|---|---|
| 1. | 18 February 2004 | Spartak Stadium, Bishkek, Kyrgyzstan | Tajikistan | 1–0 | 1–2 | 2006 FIFA World Cup qualification | |

== Honors ==
Alga Bishkek

- Kyrgyzstan League (1): 1992
- Kyrgyzstan Cup (1): 1992

Alga-PVO Bishkek

- Kyrgyzstan Cup (1): 1997

SKA-PVO Bishkek

- Kyrgyzstan League (1): 2000
- Kyrgyzstan Cup (3): 1998, 1999, 2000

Dordoi-Dynamo Naryn

- Kyrgyzstan League (4): 2004, 2005, 2006, 2007
- Kyrgyzstan Cup (3): 2004, 2005, 2006
