= 2010 Kyrgyzstan League =

Kyrgyzstan League
- Season: 2010
- Champions: FC Neftchi Kochkor-Ata
- Relegated: FC Ak-Zhol, Ak Altyn, Khimik, Sher
- AFC President's Cup: FC Neftchi Kochkor-Ata
- Matches: 192
- Goals: 550 (2.86 per match)
- Top goalscorer: Talaybek Djumatayev (15)

The 2010 Kyrgyzstan League was the 19th season since the establishment of the Kyrgyzstan League. The season began on March 27 and ended in November 2010.

== Clubs ==
Locations of teams in the 2010 Kyrgyzstan League

The following nine clubs were to play in Kyrgyzstan League during the 2010 season. Only 5 clubs played in the previous season.

- Abdysh-Ata (Kant)
- FC Ak-Zhol (Aravan) ^{1}
- FC Alay (Osh) ^{2}
- Alga (Bishkek)
- Dordoi-Dynamo (Naryn)
- FC Khimik Kara-Balta (Kara-Balta)
- FC Neftchi Kochkor-Ata (Kochkor-Ata)
- Sher-Ak-Dan (Bishkek)
- Zhashtyk Ak Altyn Kara-Suu (Kara-Suu) ^{1}

^{1} Withdrew after political developments in April.
^{2} Apparently withdrew as well.

== Format ==
Nine clubs played a two-round-robin system to decide the top four teams who will again play home-and-away to decide the winner. There was an intention to play a third round-robin, but this was cancelled.

== League table ==
Pos	Team	Pld	W	D	L	GF	GA	GD	Pts	Qualification
1	Neftchi Kochkor-Ata	20	12	7	1	36	14	+22	43	2011 AFC President's Cup
2	Dordoi-Dynamo	20	13	3	4	43	18	+25	42	
3	Abdish-Ata Kant	20	11	6	3	63	21	+42	39	
4	Alga Bishkek	20	6	4	10	26	33	−7	22	
5	Sher Bishkek	20	4	3	13	19	58	−39	15	
6	Khimik Kara-Balta	20	1	3	16	8	57	−49	6	
7	Ak-Zhol	0	0	0	0	0	0	0	0	Withdrew
8	Alay Osh	0	0	0	0	0	0	0	0	Withdrew
9	Zhashtyk Ak Altyn Karasuu	0	0	0	0	0	0	0	0	Withdrew

Updated to match(es) played on 21 September 2012. Source: rsssf.com
Rules for classification: 1) points; 2) goal difference; 3) number of goals scored.

Kyrgyzstan League 2010 winner

1st title
