= Vadim Kharchenko =

Kyrgyzstani footballer (born 1985)

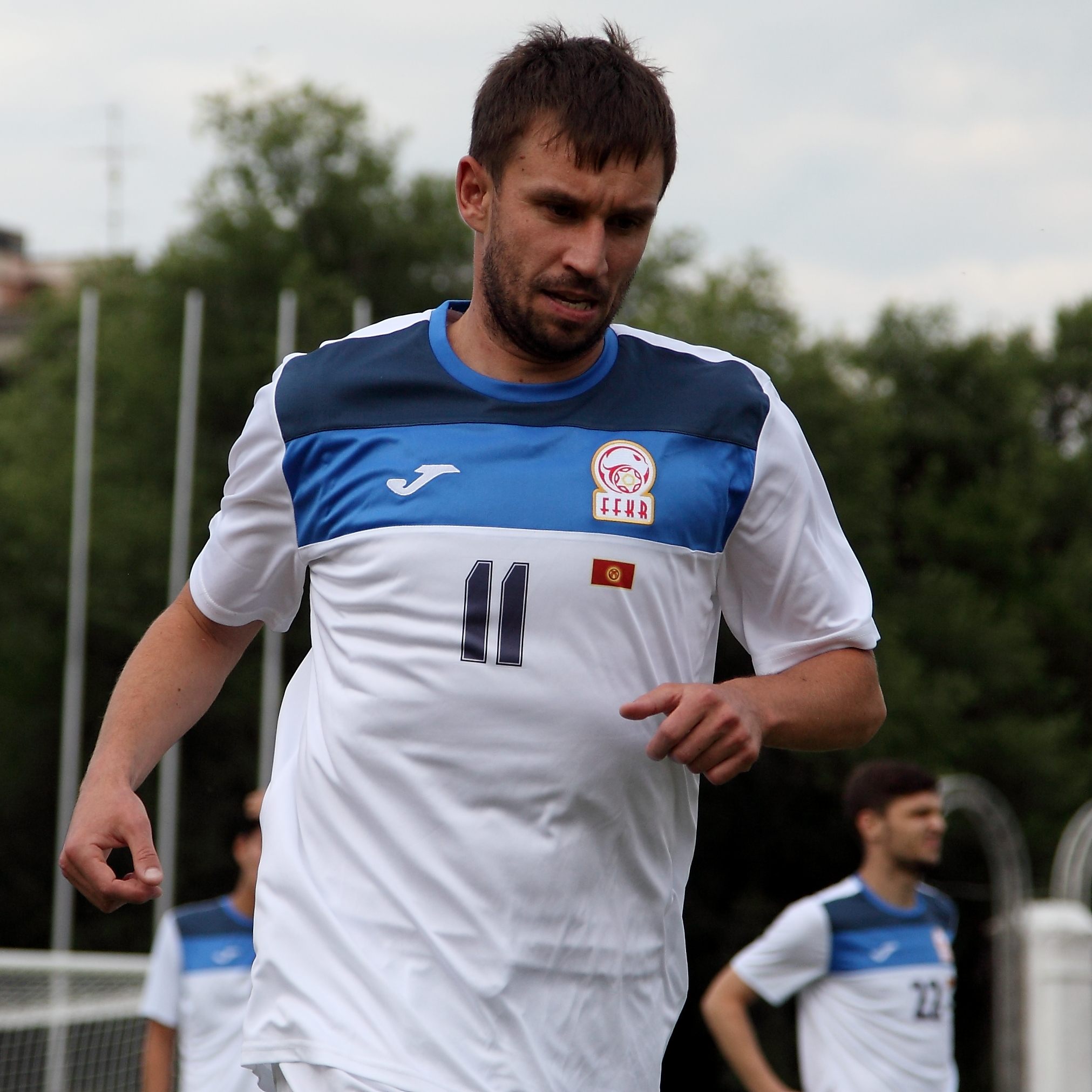

Personal information
- Full name: Vadim Kharchenko
- Date of birth: 28 May 1985 (age 41)
- Place of birth: Kyrgyz SSR, Soviet Union
- Height: 1.76 m (5 ft 9 1/2 in)
- Position: Midfielder

Team information
- Current team: Alga Bishkek
- Number: 18

Youth career
- Sher-Ak-Dan Bishkek

Senior career*
Years	Team	Apps	(Gls)
2002	Dordoi Naryn	12	(0)
2003	SKA-PVO Bishkek	27	(5)
2004–2005	SKA-Shoro Bishkek	24	(6)
2004	→ Ordobasy (loan)	18	(0)
2006–2015	Dordoi	157	(40)
2014	→ Tavsanli Linyitspor (loan)	8	(0)
2016–	Alga Bishkek		

International career^{‡}
2003–2015	Kyrgyzstan	51	(3)
- * Club domestic league appearances and goals as of 22 March 2018 ‡ National team caps and goals as of 22 March 2018

Vadim Kharchenko (Russian: Вадим Харченко; born 28 May 1985) is a Kyrgyzstani footballer, who is a midfielder of Alga Bishkek. He is a member of the Kyrgyzstan national football team. In 2006, he was named Midfielder of the Year in Kyrgyzstan.

== Career statistics ==
=== International ===
Kyrgyzstan national team
Year	Apps	Goals
2003	2	0
2004	7	0
2005	0	0
2006	7	0
2007	9	1
2008	2	0
2009	6	0
2010	2	0
2011	2	0
2012	1	0
2013	7	2
2014	4	0
2015	2	0
Total	51	3

Statistics accurate as of match played 3 September 2015

=== International goals ===
Score and Result lists Kyrgyzstan goals first

#	Date	Venue	Opponent	Score	Result	Competition
1.	19 August 2007	Ambedkar Stadium, New Delhi, India	Cambodia	4–3	4–3	2007 Nehru Cup
2.	11 June 2013	A. Le Coq Arena, Tallinn, Estonia	Estonia	1–1	1–1	Friendly
3.	14 June 2013	Sheriff Stadium, Tiraspol, Moldova	Moldova	1–1	1–2	Friendly

== Honours ==
Dordoi Bishkek

- Kyrgyzstan League (7): 2006, 2007, 2008, 2009, 2011, 2012, 2014
- Kyrgyzstan Cup (5): 2003, 2006, 2008, 2010, 2012
- AFC President's Cup (1): 2006, 2007
