= Vladislav Volkov (disambiguation) =

Vladislav Volkov (1935–1971) was a Soviet cosmonaut.

Vladislav Volkov may also refer to:

- Vladislav Volkov (Kyrgyzstani footballer) (born 1980), Kyrgyzstani football goalkeeper
- Vladislav Volkov (Russian footballer) (born 2000), Russian football defender
