= FC Zhashtyk Osh =

Kyrgyz football club

Zhashtyk Osh
- Full name: FC Zhashtyk Osh
- Ground: Suyumbayev Stadion; Osh, Kyrgyzstan
- Capacity: 12,000
- League: Kyrgyzstan League
- 1997: 8th

FC Zhashtyk Osh is a Kyrgyzstani football club based in Osh, Kyrgyzstan that plays in the top division in Kyrgyzstan, the Kyrgyzstan League. The club plays its home games at Suyumbayev Stadion. In 1998 FC Zhashtyk-Ak-Altyn Kara-Suu was founded after the merger of the teams Zhashtyk Osh and FC Ak-Altyn Kara-Suu.
