= 2006 AFC President's Cup =

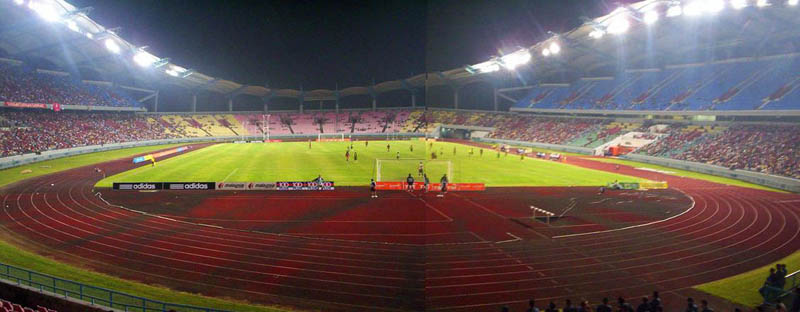
- Sarawak Stadium in Kuching hosted the final

Tournament details
- Host country: Malaysia
- Dates: 10–21 May 2006
- Teams: 8 (from 8 associations)
- Venue: 1 (in 1 host city)

Final positions
- Champions: (Kyrgyzstan) Dordoi-Dynamo Naryn (1st title)
- Runners-up: (Tajikistan) Vahsh Qurghonteppa

Tournament statistics
- Matches played: 15
- Goals scored: 49 (3.27 per match)
- Top scorer(s): (Chinese Taipei) Chuang Yao-tsung (Kyrgyzstan) Roman Kornilov (5 goals)

The 2006 AFC President's Cup was the second season of the AFC President's Cup, a competition for football clubs in countries categorized as "emerging nations" by the Asian Football Confederation. The eight teams that compete are split up into two groups and play each other team in their group once. The winner of each group then plays the runner up in the other group in the semifinals, and the winners of the semifinal matches play in the final match to determine the winner. There is no third place match. The games were played in May 2006 and were held in Kuching, Malaysia.

== Venues ==
(Malaysia) Kuching
Sarawak Stadium
Capacity: 40,000
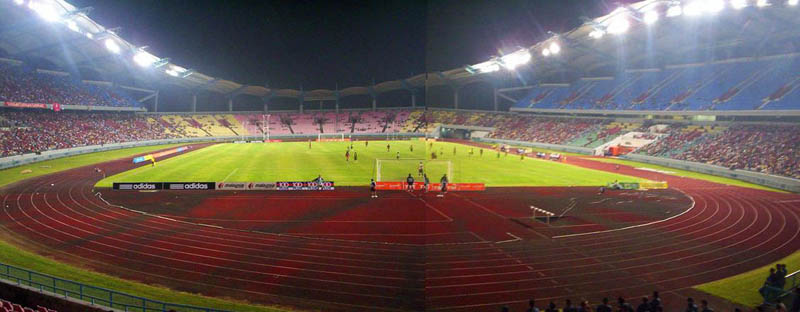

== Qualifying teams ==
Association	Team	Qualifying method	App	Last App
Bhutan	Transport United	2005 A-Division champions	2nd	2005
Cambodia	Khemara Keila	2005 Cambodian League champions	1st	none
Chinese Taipei	Tatung	2005 Chinese Taipei National Football League champions	1st	none
Kyrgyzstan	Dordoi-Dynamo	2005 Kyrgyzstan League champions	2nd	2005
Nepal	Manang Marshyangdi	2005-06 Martyr's Memorial A-Division League champions	1st	none
Pakistan	Pakistan Army	2005-06 Pakistan Premier League champions	1st	none
Sri Lanka	Ratnam	2005-06 Sri Lanka Football Premier League runners-up	1st	none
Tajikistan	Vakhsh	2005 Tajik League	1st	none

== Group stage ==
=== Group A ===
Team	Pld	W	D	L	GF	GA	GD	Pts
(Cambodia) Khemara	3	2	1	0	8	3	+5	7
(Chinese Taipei) Tatung	3	2	0	1	10	6	+4	6
(Bhutan) Transport United	3	1	0	2	2	7	−5	3
Pakistan Army	3	0	1	2	2	6	−4	1

10 May 2006
17:00

Pakistan Army	1–4	(Chinese Taipei) Tatung
Jaffar 29'	Report	Ahmed 11' (o.g.); Wu 25' (pen.); Hsu 49'; Chuang 90'

Sarawak Stadium, Kuching
Attendance: 100
Referee: Ram Krishna Gosh (Bangladesh)

10 May 2006
20:00

Khemara (Cambodia)	2–1	(Bhutan) Transport United
Veasna 45'; Song-u 90'	Report	Wangchuk 66'

Sarawak Stadium, Kuching
Attendance: 100
Referee: Subrata Sarkar (India)

12 May 2006
18:30

Transport United (Bhutan)	1–0	Pakistan Army
Dorji 90'	Report

Sarawak Stadium, Kuching
Attendance: 100
Referee: Subrata Sarkar (India)

13 May 2006
10:00

Tatung (Chinese Taipei)	1–5	(Cambodia) Khemara
Hsu 12'	Report	Song-u 56'; Ung-Chon 59', 72', 77'; Kosal 90'

Sarawak Stadium, Kuching
Attendance: 50
Referee: Abdulhameed Ebrahim (Bahrain)

14 May 2006
16:00

Pakistan Army	1–1	(Cambodia) Khemara
Chacha 36'	Report	Sokumpheak 48'

Sarawak Stadium, Kuching
Attendance: 50
Referee: Subrata Sarkar (India)

14 May 2006
18:30

Tatung (Chinese Taipei)	5–0	(Bhutan) Transport United
Lin 52'; Chuang 70', 71', 75'; Hsu 89'	Report

Sarawak Stadium, Kuching
Attendance: 50
Referee: Abdulhameed Ebrahim (Bahrain)

=== Group B ===
Team	Pld	W	D	L	GF	GA	GD	Pts
(Tajikistan) Vakhsh	3	2	0	1	6	4	+2	6
(Kyrgyzstan) Dordoi-Dynamo	3	2	0	1	5	3	+2	6
(Nepal) Manang Marshyangdi	3	1	0	2	3	5	−2	3
(Sri Lanka) Ratnam Sports Club	3	1	0	2	3	5	−2	3

11 May 2006
18:30

Manang Marshyangdi (Nepal)	0–2	(Sri Lanka) Ratnam Sports Club
	Report	Jayasuriya 66'; Mohideen 89'

Sarawak Stadium, Kuching
Attendance: 100
Referee: Satop Tongkhan (Thailand)

11 May 2006
20:00

Dordoi-Dynamo (Kyrgyzstan)	0–3	(Tajikistan) Vakhsh
	Report	Khamrakulov 24'; Karabaev 62'; Rizomov 81'

Sarawak Stadium, Kuching
Attendance: 100
Referee: Sun Baojie (China PR)

13 May 2006
16:00

Ratnam Sports Club (Sri Lanka)	0–3	(Kyrgyzstan) Dordoi-Dynamo
	Report	Kornilov 21'; Krasnov 66'; Ishenbaev 88'

Sarawak Stadium, Kuching
Attendance: 100
Referee: Sun Baojie (China PR)

13 May 2006
18:30

Vakhsh (Tajikistan)	1–3	(Nepal) Manang Marshyangdi
Rizomov 80'	Report	A.Gurung 20'; Gauchan 60'; K.Gurung 90'

Sarawak Stadium, Kuching
Attendance: 100
Referee: Satop Tongkhan (Thailand)

15 May 2006
16:30

Manang Marshyangdi (Nepal)	0–2	(Kyrgyzstan) Dordoi-Dynamo
	(Report)	Kornilov 23', 69'

Sarawak Stadium, Kuching
Attendance: 100
Referee: Satop Tongkhan (Thailand)

15 May 2006
16:30

Ratnam Sports Club (Sri Lanka)	1–2	(Tajikistan) Vakhsh
Ediribandanage 81'	Report	Rizomov 46'; Izzadeen 74' (o.g.)

Negeri Stadium, Kuching
Attendance: 50
Referee: Ram Krishna Gosh (Bangladesh)

== Knockout stage ==
=== Semi-finals ===
17 May 2006
20:00

Khemara (Cambodia)	0–3	(Kyrgyzstan) Dordoi-Dynamo
	Report	Kornilov 33', 76'; Ishenbaev 41'

Sarawak Stadium, Kuching
Attendance: 200
Referee: Ram Krishna Gosh (Bangladesh)

18 May 2006
20:00

Vakhsh (Tajikistan)	3–1	(Chinese Taipei) Tatung
Khamrakulov 43'; Savankulov 81'; Ortikov 83'	(Report)	Chuang 56'

Sarawak Stadium, Kuching
Attendance: 100
Referee: Subrata Sarkar (India)

=== Final ===
21 May 2006
20:00 UTC+08:00

Dordoi-Dynamo (Kyrgyzstan)	2–1 (a.e.t.)	(Tajikistan) Vakhsh
Amirov 36', 102'	Report	Savankulov 52'

Sarawak Stadium, Kuching
Attendance: 500
Referee: Sun Baojie (China PR)

Dordoi-Dynamo	Vakhsh

DORDOI-DYNAMO:
GK	1	Vladislav Volkov
DF	2	Nurbek Ahatov
DF	3	Talant Samsaliev
DF	4	Ruslan Sydykov (c)
DF	5	Sergey Kniazev
MF	7	Aibek Bokoev
MF	11	Azamat Ishenbaev	(yellow card) 99'	(substituted off) 120'
MF	18	Vadim Harchenko
FW	9	Roman Kornilov
FW	12	Ildar Amirov		(substituted off) 111'
FW	9	Andrey Krasnov	(yellow card) 70'	(substituted off) 72'
Substitutes:
FW	10	Zamirbek Jumagulov		(substituted on) 72'
DF	13	Timur Kydyraliev		(substituted on) 120'
FW	20	Vladimir Verevkin		(substituted on) 111'
Manager:
(Kyrgyzstan) Boris Podkorytovn

VAKHSH:
GK	1	Aslidin Khabibulloev (c)
DF	4	Suhib Suvonkulov	(yellow card) 97'
DF	5	Alexei Negmatov
DF	7	Mahmadkarim Nazarov
DF	11	Mikhrob Zakhurbekov
MF	6	Iskandar Nuridinov
MF	9	Akmal Sabourov
MF	10	Ilhomzhon Ortikov
FW	8	Nazirsho Rizomov
FW	12	Firdavs Faizullaev		(substituted off) 80'
FW	20	Akhtam Khamrakulov
Substitutes:
MF	21	Nazarali Samiev		(substituted on) 80'
Manager:
(Tajikistan) Khikmatullo Shamsudinov

Assistant referee:
Silva Benjamin (India)
Ahmed Ameez (Maldives)
Fourth official:
Ram Krishna Gosh (Bangladesh)

AFC President's Cup 2006

First title
