= Tsentral'nyi Stadion (Kara-Suu) =

Coordinates: 40°42′25″N 72°52′20″E

Tsentral'nyi Stadion is a multi-use stadium in Kara-Suu, Kyrgyzstan. It is currently used mostly for football matches and serves as the home stadium for Zhashtyk Ak Altyn Kara-Suu of the Kyrgyzstan League. The stadium holds 6,000 people.
