= Zamirbek Zhumagulov =

Kyrgyzstani footballer

Zamir Zhumagulov
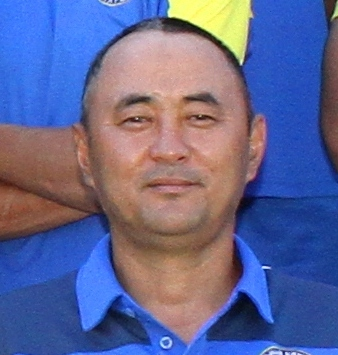

Personal information
- Full name: Zamirbek Zhumagulov Narynbaević
- Date of birth: 17 January 1972 (age 54)
- Place of birth: Kyrgyz SSR, Soviet Union (now Kyrgyzstan)
- Height: 1.80 m (5 ft 11 in)
- Position: Forward

Team information
- Current team: FC Dordoi-Plaza

Youth career
- FC Alga Bishkek

Senior career*
| Years | Team | Apps | (Gls) |
| 1992 | Ala Too | 21 | (4) |
| 1993–1996 | Alga | 78 | (34) |
| 1996 | AIK | 21 | (2) |
| 1997–2000 | Alga | 59 | (25) |
| 2000–2008 | Dordoi | 192 | (153) |
| 2008– | Dordoi Plaza | ?? | (??) |
| Total | | 371 | (218) |

International career
| 1992–2003 | Kyrgyzstan | 18 | (3) |
- * Club domestic league appearances and goals as of 16 February 2015

Zamirbek Zhumagulov (born 19 January 1972 in Kyrgyz SSR, now Kyrgyzstan) who currently plays for FC Dordoi-Plaza. Zamirbek led the club scorers of Kyrgyzstan name Almazbek Chokmorov, with 268 goals.
