= Kursanbek Sheratov =

Kyrgyzstani footballer (born 1989)

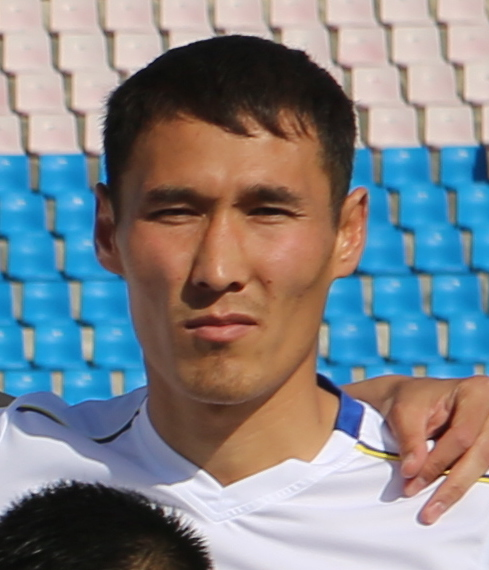
- AFC Cup 2019

Personal information
- Date of birth: 10 March 1989 (age 37)
- Place of birth: Soviet Union
- Height: 1.70 m (5 ft 7 in)
- Position: Defender

Senior career*
Years	Team	Apps	(Gls)
2006	Kyrgyzstan U-17		
2007–2009	Kant-77		
2010–2013	Abdish-Ata Kant		
2014–2019	Dordoi Bishkek		

International career^{‡}
2009–2019	Kyrgyzstan	19	(0)
- * Club domestic league appearances and goals as of 2 August 2019 ‡ National team caps and goals as of 2 August 2019

Kursanbek Sheratov (ru: Курсанбек Шератов), born 10 March 1989, was a Kyrgyzstani footballer who was banned for life from playing football in August 2019.

== Career ==
=== Club ===
On 22 July 2019, FC Dordoi Bishkek announced that Sheratov had left their club. On 2 August 2019, the Asian Football Confederation announced that Sheratov had been banned for life for his involvement in a conspiracy to manipulate matches during Dordoi Bishkek 2017 AFC Cup campaign.

=== International ===
Sheratov was a member of the Kyrgyzstan national football team from 2009.

== Career stats ==
=== International ===
Kyrgyzstan national team
Year	Apps	Goals
2009	2	0
2010	2	0
2011	5	0
2012	1	0
2013	1	0
2014	0	0
2015	2	0
2016	0	0
2017	1	0
2018	5	0
2019	0	0
Total	19	0

Statistics accurate as of match played 10 October 2018
