= Azamat Baymatov =

Kyrgyzstani footballer (born 1989)

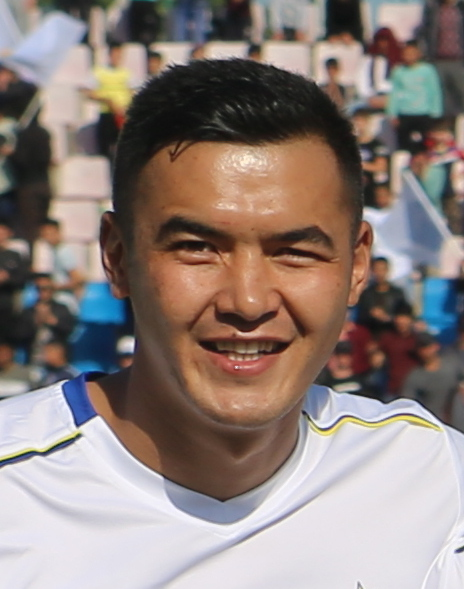

Personal information
- Full name: Azamat Asilbekovich Baymatov
- Date of birth: 3 December 1989 (age 36)
- Place of birth: Osh, Kirghiz SSR, Soviet Union
- Height: 1.88 m (6 ft 2 in)
- Position: Centre-back

Senior career*
Years	Team	Apps	(Gls)
2005	Ak-Bura Osh		
2006–2008	Alay Osh		
2008	Dordoi Bishkek	8	(0)
2009	Tranzīts	14	(0)
2009	Ventspils	5	(0)
2010–2011	Dordoi Bishkek	32	(4)
2012	Sibir Novosibirsk	8	(0)
2012–2015	Dordoi Bishkek	46	(21)
2015–2016	Sitra Club	3	(1)
2016–2017	Riffa	5	(0)
2018	Borneo	13	(0)
2019	Dordoi Bishkek	7	(0)
2020	Kuala Lumpur City	10	(0)
2021	Alga Bishkek	5	(0)
2021	Barito Putera	16	(2)
2022–2023	Neftchi Kochkor-Ata	12	(2)
2023	Alga Bishkek	21	(1)
2023	Persipura Jayapura	11	(1)
2024–2025	Alga Bishkek		

International career^{‡}
2010–2019	Kyrgyzstan	36	(4)
- * Club domestic league appearances and goals as of 14 Decemder 2025 ‡ National team caps and goals as of 9 November 2019

Azamat Asilbekovich Baymatov (Kyrgyz: Азамат Байматов; Russian: Азамат Асилбекович Байматов; born 3 December 1989) is a Kyrgyzstani former professional footballer who played as a centre-back.

== Club career ==
Baymatov played in Latvia for Tranzīts, and Russia, before he returned to Kyrgyzstan.

=== Borneo ===
On 22 December 2017, Baymatov signed a one-year contract with Indonesian Liga 1 club Borneo on a free transfer. He made his league debut for Borneo on 2 April 2018 in a Mahakam derby 0–1 win against Mitra Kukar in the 2018 Liga 1.

=== Dordoi Bishkek ===
On 5 December 2018, Dordoi Bishkek announced that Baymatov had re-joined their club, signing alongside Anton Zemlianukhin and Pavel Matyash. On 3 December 2019, Dordoi Bishkek announced the departure of Baymatov at the end of his contract.

=== Kuala Lumpur ===
On 6 January 2020, Baymatov signed a one-year contract with Malaysia Super League club Kuala Lumpur on a free transfer.

=== Barito Putera ===
On 13 June 2021, Baymatov returned to Indonesia for joined club Barito Putera on a one-year contract. He made his league debut on 4 September, by starting in a 1–0 loss against Persib Bandung.

On 25 October, he scored his first goal for Barito Putera in a 0–1 win over Persipura Jayapura, where he scored with a header in the 55th minute.

== Career statistics ==
=== International ===
Kyrgyzstan national team
Year	Apps	Goals
2010	3	0
2011	4	0
2012	1	1
2013	1	0
2014	8	1
2015	7	1
2016	5	0
2017	3	1
2018	2	0
2019	2	0
Total	36	4

Statistics accurate as of match played 1 November 2019

=== International goals ===
Scores and results list Kyrgyzstan's goal tally first.

#	Date	Venue	Opponent	Score	Result	Competition
1.	1 June 2012	Central Stadium, Almaty, Kazakhstan	Kazakhstan	1–2	2–5	Friendly
2.	16 May 2014	Al Kuwait Sports Club Stadium, Kuwait City, Kuwait	Kuwait	2–2	2–2	Friendly
3.	16 June 2015	Dolen Omurzakov Stadium, Bishkek, Kyrgyzstan	Australia	1–2	1–2	2018 WCQ
4.	28 March 2017	Dolen Omurzakov Stadium, Bishkek, Kyrgyzstan	Macau	1–0	1–0	2019 AFC Asian Cup qualification
Correct as of 19 March 2018
