= FC Ak-Zhol =

Kyrgyz football club

- Full name: Football Club Ak-Zhol
- Founded: 1997; 28 years ago
- Ground: Aravan Stadium; Aravan, Kyrgyzstan
- Capacity: 2,000
- League: Kyrgyzstan League
- 2003: 8th
Home colours	Away colours

FC Ak-Zhol is a Kyrgyz football club based in Aravan, Kyrgyzstan that plays in the top division in Kyrgyzstan League that controls bye Football Federation of Kyrgyz Republic .

Aravan's football club shown by different names in the Kyrgyzstan League. The club plays its home games at Aravan Stadium. The best performance of the FC Ak-Zhol was Kyrgyzstan Cup 2005 by reached the Semi-finals.

== History ==
- 1997: Founded as FC Yangiyul Aravan.
- 1998: Renamed FC Druzhba Aravan.
- 2002: Renamed FC Ak Bula Aravan.
- 2004: Renamed Sharab-K Aravan.
- 2005: Renamed FC Dinamo Aravan.
- 2005: Renamed FC Al Fagir Aravan.
- 2006: Renamed FC Dinamo Aravan.
- 2010: Renamed FC Ak-Zhol Aravan.

== Performance in Kyrgyzstan League ==
- Kyrgyzstan Cup: 7 appearances

1997: 1/16 finals
2003: 1/16 finals
2004: 1/16 finals
2005: 1/4 Semi-finals
2006: 1/16 finals
2007: 1/32 finals
2008: 1/32 finals

- Kyrgyzstan League: 5 appearances

2002 : 9th

2003 : 4th in Zone B

2005 : withdrew due to financial problems and started playing at the Kyrgyzstan League Second Level.

2006 : 5th in Group B

2010 : withdrew from Kyrgyzstan League due to political unrest in April 2010.

- Kyrgyzstan League Second Level: 3 appearances

2001 : 1st in Zone B (South)

2004 : 2nd in Zone B-2 (Osh Region)

2005 : 5th in Southern Zone
