= Tursunali Rustamov =

Kyrgyzstani footballer (born 1990)

Personal information
- Full name: Tursunali Khaitmakhamatovich Rustamov
- Date of birth: 31 January 1990 (age 36)
- Place of birth: Kara-Balta, Kirghiz SSR, Soviet Union
- Height: 1.78 m (5 ft 10 in)
- Position: Forward

Senior career*
Years	Team	Apps	(Gls)
2009–2010	Sher-Ak-Dan Bishkek		(6)
2011–2012	Alga Bishkek		(13)
2013	Dordoi Bishkek		(6)
2014	Khujand		
2014–2016	Alga Bishkek		
2017–2018	Alay Osh		
2018	Alga Bishkek	?	(9)
2019	Khujand	20	(8)
2020–2021	Dordoi Bishkek	30	(9)
2022	Neftchi Kochkor-Ata		
2022–2024	Dordoi Bishkek		
2024	Alga Bishkek	12	(2)

International career^{‡}
2012–2024	Kyrgyzstan	25	(6)
- * Club domestic league appearances and goals as of 30 August 2024 @ 13:02(AEST) ‡ National team caps and goals as of 26 April 2026

Tursunali Khaitmakhamatovich Rustamov (Kyrgyz: Турсунали Рустамов; Russian: Турсунали Хаитмахаматович Рустамов; born 31 January 1990) is a Kyrgyzstani former footballer who played as a forward.

== Club career ==
On 23 February 2019, Rustamov signed for Khujand.

On 25 December 2019, Dordoi Bishkek announced the return of Rustamov for the 2020 season.

On 15 July 2022, Dordoi Bishkek announced the signing of Rustamov on a contract until the end of the season.

== International career ==
Rustamov is a member of the Kyrgyzstan national team. He made his debut in the match against Kazakhstan, on 1 June 2012. On 6 September 2013, Rustamov scored his first goal in a 3–1 away defeat friendly against Belarus.

== Career statistics ==
=== International ===
Statistics accurate as of match played 16 November 2021

Kyrgyzstan
Year	Apps	Goals
2012	1	0
2013	4	1
2014	2	0
2015	1	0
2016	1	0
2017	0	0
2018	2	1
2019	7	2
2020	0	0
2021	7	2
2022	0	0
Total	25	6

==== International goals ====
Scores and results list Kyrgyzstan's goal tally first.

No.	Date	Venue	Opponent	Score	Result	Competition
1.	6 September 2013	Haradski Stadium, Barysaw, Belarus	Belarus	1–2	1–3	Friendly
2.	20 December 2018	Suheim bin Hamad Stadium, Doha, Qatar	Jordan	1–0	1–0	Friendly
3.	21 January 2019	Zayed Sports City Stadium, Abu Dhabi, United Arab Emirates	United Arab Emirates	2–2	2–3 (a.e.t.)	2019 AFC Asian Cup
4.	11 June 2019	Dolen Omurzakov Stadium, Bishkek, Kyrgyzstan	Palestine	1–0	2–1	Friendly
5.	11 June 2021	Yanmar Stadium Nagai, Osaka, Japan	Myanmar	1–0	8–1	2022 FIFA World Cup qualification
6.	7 September 2021	Dolen Omurzakov Stadium, Bishkek, Kyrgyzstan	Bangladesh	3–0	4–1	Friendly
