= Dynamo Stadion =

Sports venue in Bishkek, Kyrgyzstan

Coordinates: 42°50′19″N 74°35′25″E

Dynamo Stadion is a multi-use stadium in Bishkek, Kyrgyzstan. It is currently used mostly for association football matches and serves as the home stadium for Alga of the Kyrgyz Premier League. It used to host Sher-Ak-Dan Bishkek, Dinamo MVD and Dinamo-Manas-SKIF. The stadium has a capacity of 10,000 people.
