= 2005 Kyrgyzstan Cup =

The 2005 edition of the Kyrgyzstan Cup was the annual Kyrgyzstan football competition between domestic clubs.

== Play-off round ==
=== First round ===
The first round matches were played on 17 April 2005.

Team 1	Score	Team 2
YSYKKOL Karakol	1–2	IGU Karakol
FK BISHKEK-89	6–1	Burana Tokmak
Egrisi-Usta Bishkek	0–1	FK SHOPOKOV
FK Ysykata	0–4	SHER Bishkek
FK BISHKEK-90	w/o	Maksat Belovodsk
FK Pokrovka	0–1	BOO-TEREK Talas
HAPPY DAY Kant	w/o	RUOR Bishkek
FK SEYIL	1–0	Ak-Bura Osh
Kara-Shoro Ozgon	0–3	OSH YOUTH TEAM

Byes: FK Naryn, Svetotekhnika Maylusuu.

=== Second round ===
The second round matches were played on 20 April 2005.

Team 1	Score	Team 2
YSYKKOL Karakol	1–2	GUARDIA RUOR Bishkek
FK BISHKEK-89	0–8	Dordoi-Dynamo Naryn
FK Naryn	w/o	Abdish-Ata Kant
FK Shopokov	2–3	ALYKUL OSMONOV Kainda
SHER Bishkek	2–1	Nashe Pivo Kant
FK Bishkek-90	0–4	Alga Bishkek
BOO-TEREK Talas	beat	Team Kyrgyzstan U-21
HAPPY DAY Kant	w/o	Jayil Baatyr Kara-Balta
FK Seyil	0–0 (pen 1–3)	AL FAGIR Aravan
Osh Youth Team	lost to	Zhashtyk Ak Altyn Kara-Suu
Svetotekhnika Maylusuu	1–2	FC Neftchi Kochkor-Ata

Byes: FK Batken, Metallurg Kadamjay, Alay Osh, Asyl Jalal-Abad, Shakhtyor Tash-Kömür.

== Round of 16 ==
The Round of 16 matches were played between 2–11 May 2005.

Team 1	Score	Team 2
Dordoi-Dynamo Naryn	5–1	Guardia RUOR Bishkek
Sher Bishkek	1–5	Alga Bishkek
Zhashtyk Ak Altyn Kara-Suu	7–0	Asyl Jalal-Abad
AL FAGIR Aravan	1–1 (pen 3–2)	Alay Osh
Boo-Terek Talas	0–2	HAPPY DAY Kant
Abdish-Ata Kant	beat	Alykul Osmonov Kainda
FC Neftchi Kochkor-Ata	beat	Shakhtyor Tash-Kömür
FK Batken	lost to	Metallurg Kadamjay

NB: Metallurg Kadamjay changed name to Kurban-100 Kadamjay.

=== Quarterfinals ===
The Quarterfinals matches was played between 17 May-1 June 2005.

Team 1	Score	Team 2
Alga Bishkek	8–0,5–0	Happy Day Kant
AL FAGIR Aravan	5–0,1–2	Kurban-100 Kadamjay
Abdish-Ata Kant	0–5,0–2	Dordoi-Dynamo Naryn
FC Neftchi Kochkor-Ata	w/o	Zhashtyk Ak Altyn Kara-Suu

=== Semifinals ===
The first legs was played on 4 June, and the second legs was played on 8 June 2005.

Team 1	Agg.	Team 2	1st leg	2nd leg
AL FAGIR Aravan (Kyrgyzstan)	1–17	(Kyrgyzstan) Zhashtyk Ak Altyn Kara-Suu	0-5	1-12
Dordoi-Dynamo Naryn (Kyrgyzstan)	2–1	(Kyrgyzstan) Alga Bishkek	0-1	2-0

=== Finals ===
The final of the Kyrgyzstan Cup 2005 was held on 1 September 2005 at the Spartak Stadium in Bishkek.

Attendance: 7,200

Referee: Mashentsev (Osh).

Team 1	Score	Team 2
Zhashtyk Ak Altyn Kara-Suu (Kyrgyzstan)	0–1	Dordoi-Dynamo Naryn Chikishev 7'

Kyrgyzstan Cup 2005 Winner

Dordoi-Dynamo Naryn
4th Title
