= 2009 Kyrgyzstan League =

Kyrgyzstan League
- Season: 2009
- Champions: Dordoi Bishkek
- Relegated: Ata Spor
- AFC President's Cup: Dordoi Bishkek
- Matches: 84
- Goals: 271 (3.23 per match)
- Top goalscorer: Maksim Kretov (15)

The 2009 Kyrgyzstan League (Kyrgyz: Vysshaja Liga) was the 18th season of the top-level football league of Kyrgyzstan. It began in May 2009 with the first match of the regular season and finished in November 2009 with a championship decision match between Abdish-Ata Kant and Dordoi-Dynamo Naryn.

== Team overview ==
Locations of teams in the 2009 Kyrgyzstan League
- Alay Osh
- Kambar-Ata
- Abdish-Ata Kant
- Dordoi-Dynamo
- Sher Bishkek
- Kant-77
- Dordoi-Plaza (Bishkek)
- Ata Spor (Kant)
- Zhashtyk Ak Altyn Karasuu

== Regular season ==
Each team played against every other team once at home and once away for a total of sixteen matches. The best four teams advanced to the Championship Pool.

=== League table ===
Pos	Team	Pld	W	D	L	GF	GA	GD	Pts	Qualification or relegation
1	Dordoi-Dynamo	16	13	3	0	53	9	+44	42	Qualification for Championship Pool
2	Abdish-Ata Kant	16	10	4	2	43	8	+35	34	Qualification for Championship Pool
3	Alay Osh	16	10	3	3	37	18	+19	33	Qualification for Championship Pool
4	Zhashtyk Ak Altyn Karasuu	16	8	4	4	29	15	+14	28	Qualification for Championship Pool
5	Kant-77	16	6	4	6	24	17	+7	22	
6	Sher Bishkek	16	6	4	6	21	20	+1	22	
7	Kambar-Ata	16	3	0	13	15	40	−25	9	
8	Dordoi-Plaza	16	2	2	12	13	59	−46	8	
9	Ata Spor	16	1	2	13	12	61	−49	5	Relegation to second level

Source: https://www.rsssf.org/tablesk/kyrg09.html
Rules for classification: 1) points; 2) goal difference; 3) number of goals scored.

=== Results table ===
Home \ Away	AAK	AOS	ATA	DDY	DPL	KAM	K77	SHE	ZHA
Abdish-Ata Kant		3–0	7–0	2–3	8–0	5–1	0–0	0–0	1–1
Alay Osh	2–0		2–0	1–1	5–0	4–1	0–0	1–0	1–0
Ata Spor	0–4	1–6		0–8	3–3	0–4	0–1	0–0	2–3
Dordoi-Dynamo	0–0	6–0	6–1		4–0	3–0	1–1	2–0	3–1
Dordoi-Plaza	0–3	1–9	4–1	0–6		2–0	0–2	1–2	1–4
Kambar-Ata	0–2	4–1	1–2	0–3	1–0		1–3	0–4	0–2
Kant-77	1–2	0–2	3–2	0–1	6–0	4–1		1–1	2–3
Sher Bishkek	0–5	1–3	3–0	2–4	4–0	2–1	1–0		0–0
Zhashtyk Ak Altyn Karasuu	0–1	0–0	6–0	1–2	1–1	3–0	2–0	2–1	

Source: https://www.rsssf.org/tablesk/kyrg09.html
Legend: Blue = home team win; Yellow = draw; Red = away team win.

== Championship Pool ==
=== League table ===
Pos	Team	Pld	W	D	L	GF	GA	GD	Pts	Qualification
1	Dordoi-Dynamo	6	3	2	1	9	3	+6	11	2010 AFC President's Cup
2	Abdish-Ata Kant	6	3	2	1	9	3	+6	11	
3	Alay Osh	6	1	2	3	3	9	−6	5	
4	Zhashtyk Ak Altyn Karasuu	6	1	2	3	3	9	−6	5	

Updated to match(es) played on 5 November 2009. Source: https://www.rsssf.org/tablesk/kyrg09.html
Rules for classification: 1) points; 2) goal difference; 3) number of goals scored.

=== Results table ===
Home \ Away	AAK	AOS	DDY	ZHA
Abdish-Ata Kant		3–0	1–0	3–0
Alay Osh	1–0		1–1	0–0
Dordoi-Dynamo	1–1	3–0		3–0
Zhashtyk Ak Altyn Karasuu	1–1	2–1	0–1	

Updated to match(es) played on 5 November 2009. Source: https://www.rsssf.org/tablesk/kyrg09.html
Legend: Blue = home team win; Yellow = draw; Red = away team win.

=== Decision match ===
Since Abdish-Ata and Dordoi-Dynamo finished the Championship Pool with an equal number of points, a decision match will determine the 2009 league champions.

== Match ==
Dordoi-Dynamo	3 – 2	Abdish-Ata
Vadim Harchenko 20'; Maxim Kretov 70'; David Tetteh 79'	Report	Anton Zemlianuhin 11', 49'

Kyrgyzstan League 2009 winner
Dordoi-Dynamo
6th title
