= Andrey Krasnov =

Kyrgyzstani footballer

Personal information
- Date of birth: 6 July 1981 (age 45)
- Place of birth: Soviet Union
- Position: Striker

Team information
- Current team: Dordoi-Dynamo Naryn

Senior career*
| Years | Team | Apps | (Gls) |
| 2002–2007 | Dordoi-Dynamo Naryn | | |
| 2008 | Sher-Ak-Dan Bishkek | | |

International career
| 2003–2007 | Kyrgyzstan | 7 | (2) |
- * Club domestic league appearances and goals

Andrey Krasnov (born 6 July 1981) is a retired Kyrgyzstani footballer who played for various clubs in his country including Dordoi-Dynamo Naryn. He was a member of the Kyrgyzstan national football team.

== Career statistics ==
Appearances and goals by national team and year
| National team | Year | Apps | Goals |
|---|---|---|---|
| Kyrgyzstan | 2003 | 1 | 1 |
| Kyrgyzstan | 2004 | 1 | 0 |
| Kyrgyzstan | 2005 | – | |
| Kyrgyzstan | 2006 | 4 | 1 |
| Kyrgyzstan | 2007 | 1 | 0 |
| Total | | 7 | 2 |

Scores and results list Kyrgyzstan's goal tally first, score column indicates score after each Krasnov goal.

List of international goals scored by Andrey Krasnov
| No. | Date | Venue | Opponent | Score | Result | Competition |
|---|---|---|---|---|---|---|
| 1 | 3 December 2003 | Dolen Omurzakov Stadium, Bishkek, Kyrgyzstan | Pakistan | 4–0 | 4–0 | 2006 FIFA World Cup qualification |
| 2 | 6 April 2006 | Bangabandhu National Stadium, Dhaka, Bangladesh | Tajikistan | 1–0 | 1–0 | 2006 AFC Challenge Cup |
