= Suyumbayev Stadion =

Sporting venue in Kazakhstan

Coordinates: 40°31′14″N 72°48′17″E

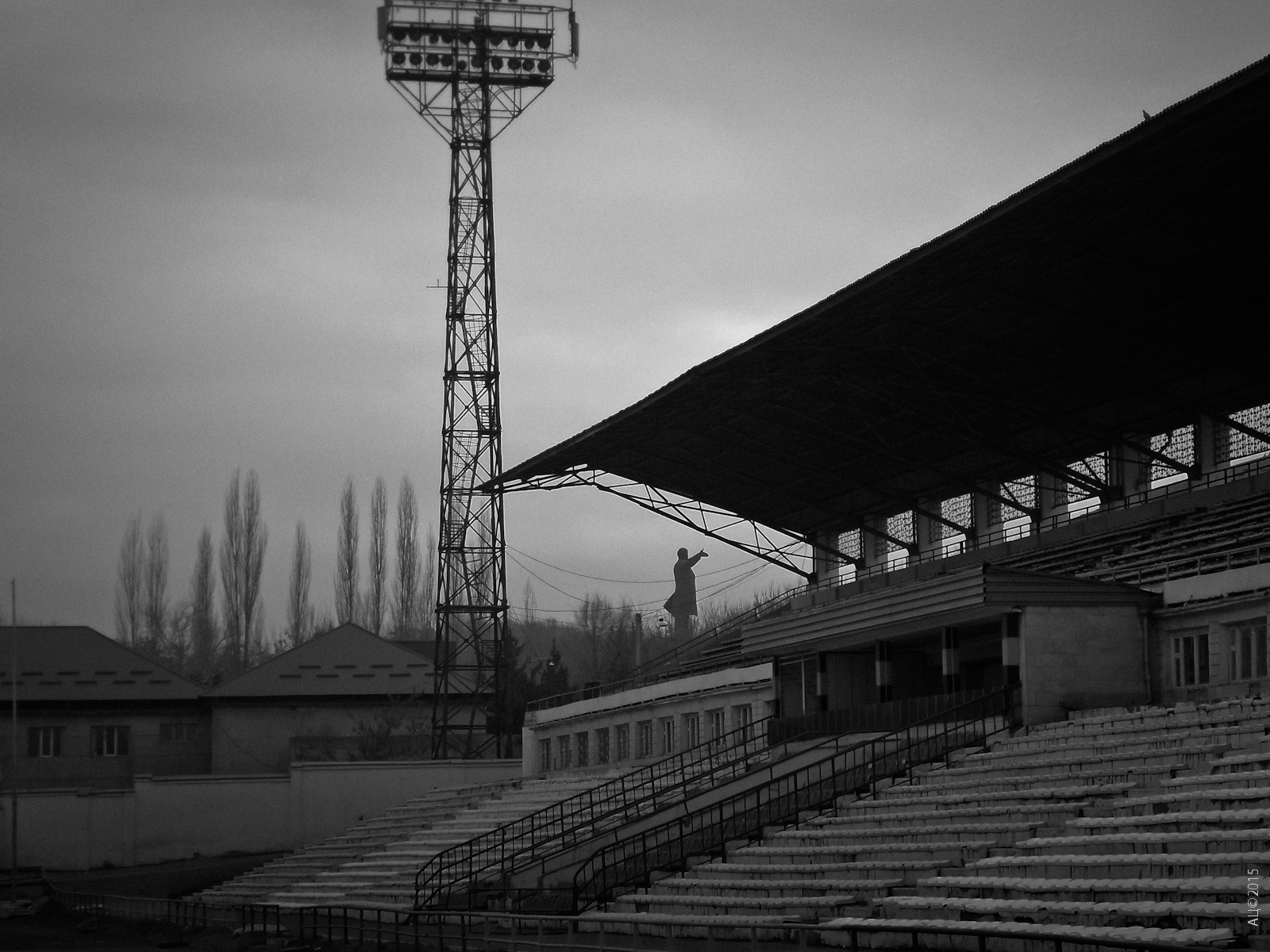
Suyumbayev Stadion

Suyumbayev Stadion is a multi-use stadium in Osh, Kyrgyzstan. It is currently used mostly for football matches and serves as the home stadium for Alay Osh and Ak-Bura Osh of the Kyrgyzstan League. The stadium has a capacity of 12,000 people.
