= 2006 FIFA World Cup qualification – AFC first round =

International football competition

The 2006 FIFA World Cup qualification AFC play-off was the first round of the Asian Football Confederation qualification for the 2006 FIFA World Cup. The 14 teams with the lowest FIFA rankings played home-and-away knockout matches to qualify for the second stage.

== Summary ==
Team 1	Agg.	Team 2	1st leg	2nd leg
Turkmenistan	13–0	Afghanistan	11–0	2–0
Chinese Taipei	6–1	Macau	3–0	3–1
Bangladesh	0–4	Tajikistan	0–2	0–2
Laos	0–3	Sri Lanka	0–0	0–3
Pakistan	0–6	Kyrgyzstan	0–2	0–4
Mongolia	0–13	Maldives	0–1	0–12

== Matches ==
19 November 2003
19:00

Turkmenistan	11–0	Afghanistan
Öwekow 6', 35'; Kulyýew 8', 22', 81'; Baýramow 27'; Berdiýew 42'; Agabaýew 49', 65', 67'; Urazow 90'	(Report)

Olympic Stadium, Ashgabat
Attendance: 12,000
Referee: Emil Busurmankulov (Kyrgyzstan)
23 November 2003
13:30

Afghanistan	0–2	Turkmenistan
	(Report)	Kulyýew 85', 91'

National Stadium, Kabul
Attendance: 6,000
Referee: Jahangir Khan (Pakistan)

Turkmenistan won 13–0 on aggregate and advanced to the second round.

23 November 2003
14:00

Chinese Taipei	3–0	Macau
Chuang Yao-tsung 23'; Chen Jui-te 52'; Chang Wu-yeh 57'	(Report)

Chungshan Soccer Stadium, Taipei
Attendance: 2,000
Referee: Jimmy Napitupulu (Indonesia)
29 November 2003
15:00

Macau	1–3	Chinese Taipei
Fu Weng Lei 87'	(Report)	Chen Jui-te 14', 69'; Chiang Shih-lu 66'

Estádio Campo Desportivo, Macau
Attendance: 250
Referee: Zhou Weixin (China)

Chinese Taipei won 6–1 on aggregate and advanced to the second round.

26 November 2003
15:00

Bangladesh	0–2	Tajikistan
	(Report)	Hamidov 11'; Khakimov 51'

Sher-e-Bangla Cricket Stadium, Dhaka
Attendance: 6,000
Referee: Virat Khanthachai (Thailand)
30 November 2003
14:00

Tajikistan	2–0	Bangladesh
Kholmatov 15'; Rabiev 83'	(Report)

Pamir Stadium, Dushanbe
Attendance: 12,000
Referee: Manuel Pereira (India)

Tajikistan won 4–0 on aggregate and advanced to the second round.

29 November 2003
17:00

Laos	0–0	Sri Lanka
	(Report)

Laos National Stadium, Vientiane
Attendance: 4,500
Referee: Luong The Tai (Vietnam)
3 December 2003
18:30

Sri Lanka	3–0	Laos
Ediri 35'; Jayasuriya 59'; Hameed 90+3'	(Report)

Sugathadasa Stadium, Colombo
Attendance: 6,000
Referee: Ali Saleem (Maldives)

Sri Lanka won 3–0 on aggregate and advanced to the second round.

29 November 2003
15:00

Pakistan	0–2	Kyrgyzstan
	(Report)	Boldygin 36'; Chikishev 59'

People's Football Stadium, Karachi
Attendance: 10,000
Referee: Ibrahim Nesar (Bangladesh)
3 December 2003
13:00

Kyrgyzstan	4–0	Pakistan
Chikishev 18'; Chertkov 28'; Boldygin 67'; Krasnov 92'	(Report)

Spartak Stadium, Bishkek
Attendance: 12,000
Referee: Mamed Mamedov (Turkmenistan)

Kyrgyzstan won 6–0 on aggregate and advanced to the second round.

29 November 2003
13:00

Mongolia	0–1	Maldives
	(Report)	Nizam 24'

National Sports Stadium, Ulaanbaatar
Attendance: 2,000
Referee: Yang Zhiqiang (China)
3 December 2003
15:35

Maldives	12–0	Mongolia
Ashfaq 4', 61', 63', 68'; Nizam 42'; Fazeel 45+1', 45+4'; Ghani 65'; Thoriq 74', 78'; Battulga 75' (o.g.); Nazeeh 80'	(Report)

Rasmee Dhandu Stadium, Malé
Attendance: 9,000
Referee: Deshapryia Arambekade (Sri Lanka)

Maldives won 13–0 on aggregate and advanced to the second round.

== Ranking of losing teams ==
Both Guam and Nepal would have played against each other to decide who progresses to the next round. After Nepal withdrew first, Guam would have progressed but Guam withdrew later as well. So, FIFA decided to elect a "lucky loser", to find the best of the teams that lost, who would also advance to the second round.

The losers were compared, using the following criteria to break ties:
a) number of points
b) goal difference
c) goals scored

Team	Pld	W	D	L	GF	GA	GD	Pts
Laos	2	0	1	1	0	3	−3	1
Bangladesh	2	0	0	2	0	4	−4	0
Macau	2	0	0	2	1	6	−5	0
Pakistan	2	0	0	2	0	6	−6	0
Afghanistan	2	0	0	2	0	13	−13	0
Mongolia	2	0	0	2	0	13	−13	0

Thus, Laos advanced to the second round.

== Goalscorers ==
There were 46 goals scored in 12 matches, for an average of 3.83 goals per match.

5 goals

- (Turkmenistan national football team) Begençmuhammet Kulyýew

4 goals

- (Maldives national football team) Ali Ashfaq

3 goals

- (Chinese Taipei national football team) Chen Jui-te
- (Turkmenistan national football team) Rejepmyrat Agabaýew

2 goals

- (Kyrgyzstan national football team) Evgeny Boldygin
- (Kyrgyzstan national football team) Sergey Chikishev
- (Maldives national football team) Ibrahim Fazeel
- (Maldives national football team) Mohamed Nizam
- (Maldives national football team) Ahmed Thoriq
- (Turkmenistan national football team) Guwançmuhammet Öwekow

1 goal

- (Chinese Taipei national football team) Chang Wu-yeh
- (Chinese Taipei national football team) Chiang Shih-lu
- (Chinese Taipei national football team) Chuang Yao-tsung
- (Kyrgyzstan national football team) Vladimir Chertkov
- (Kyrgyzstan national football team) Andrey Krasnov
- (Macau national football team) Fu Weng Lei
- (Maldives national football team) Assad Ghani
- (Maldives national football team) Mohamed Nazeeh
- (Sri Lanka national football team) Channa Ediri
- (Sri Lanka national football team) Mohamed Hameed
- (Sri Lanka national football team) Kasun Jayasuriya
- (Tajikistan national football team) Sukhrob Hamidov
- (Tajikistan national football team) Numondzhon Khakimov
- (Tajikistan national football team) Akmal Kholmatov
- (Tajikistan national football team) Yusuf Rabiev
- (Turkmenistan national football team) Nazar Baýramow
- (Turkmenistan national football team) Omar Berdiýew
- (Turkmenistan national football team) Didargylyç Urazow

1 own goal

- (Mongolia national football team) Khishigdalai Battulga (against Maldives)

== See also ==
- 2006 FIFA World Cup qualification – AFC second round
