= Ildar Amirov =

Kyrgyzstani footballer (born 1987)

Personal information
- Full name: Ildar Amirov
- Date of birth: 9 October 1987 (age 39)
- Place of birth: Kirghiz SSR, Soviet Union
- Height: 1.87 m (6 ft 2 in)
- Position: Forward

Team information
- Current team: Chennai City

Senior career*
Years	Team	Apps	(Gls)
2004–2005	Kyrgyzstan U-21	32	(7)
2006	Muras-Sport Bishkek		(7)
2004–2010	Dordoi-Dynamo Naryn		(9)
2011	Dordoi Bishkek		(1)
2012	Udon Thani	9	(0)
2012–2013	Abdish-Ata Kant		
2014–2015	Alay Osh		
2015	Alga Bishkek		
2015	Turanspor	7	(2)
2017	East Bengal	2	(0)
2017	FC Alga Bishkek	1	(0)
2017–2018	Chennai City		

International career^{‡}
2006–	Kyrgyzstan	39	(3)
- * Club domestic league appearances and goals as of 1 September 2017 ‡ National team caps and goals as of 6 October 2015

Ildar Amirov (Tatar: Илдар Әмиров, romanized: İldar Ämiref; born 9 October 1987) is a Kyrgyzstani footballer of Tatar descent, last played as a striker.

== Career ==
He played for Chennai City in the I-League. He is a member of the Kyrgyzstan national football team. He is the older brother of Ruslan.

== Career statistics ==
=== International ===
Kyrgyzstan national team
Year	Apps	Goals
2006	3	0
2007	5	0
2008	2	0
2009	6	1
2010	3	1
2011	3	0
2013	4	0
2014	6	0
2015	6	1
2016	1	0
Total	39	3

Statistics accurate as of match played 7 June 2016

=== International goals ===
Scores and results list Kyrgyzstan's goal tally first.

#	Date	Venue	Opponent	Score	Result	Competition
1.	28 August 2009	Ambedkar Stadium, New Delhi, India	Sri Lanka	2–0	4–1	Friendly
2.	17 February 2010	Sugathadasa Stadium, Colombo, Sri Lanka	India	1–0	2–1	2010 AFC Challenge Cup
3.	13 October 2015	Spartak Stadium, Bishkek, Kyrgyzstan	Bangladesh	2–0	2–0	2018 FIFA World Cup qualification
