= FC Dordoi-Plaza =

Kyrgyz football club

Dordoi-Plaza Bishkek
- Full name: FC Dordoi-Plaza Bishkek
- Ground: Bishkek, Kyrgyzstan
- League: Kyrgyzstan League
- 2009: Kyrgyzstan League, 8th

FC Dordoi-Plaza was a Kyrgyzstani football club based in Bishkek, that played in the top division Kyrgyzstan League.

== Achievements ==
Kyrgyzstan League:

- 8th place: 2009
