= FC Kant =

Kyrgyz football club

- Full name: FC Kant
- Founded: 2007; 18 years ago
- Ground: Kant, Kyrgyzstan
- League: Kyrgyzstan League
- 2009: 5th

FC Kant is a Kyrgyzstani football club based in Kant that plays in the top division in Kyrgyzstan, the Kyrgyzstan League.

== History ==
- 2007: Founded as FC Kant-77.
- 2010: Renamed to FC Kant.
- 2010: Dissolved

== Current squad ==
Note: Flags indicate national team as defined under FIFA eligibility rules; some limited exceptions apply. Players may hold more than one non-FIFA nationality.

No.	Pos.	Nation	Player
—	DF	(Kyrgyzstan) KGZ	Kursanbek Sheratov
