= FC Ak-Bura Osh =

Kyrgyz football club

Ak-Bura Osh
- Full name: FC Ak-Bura Osh
- Ground: Suyumbayev Stadion; Osh, Kyrgyzstan
- Capacity: 12,000
- League: Kyrgyzstan League
- 2006: 4th, group B

FC Ak-Bura Osh is a Kyrgyzstani football club based in Osh, Kyrgyzstan that plays in the top division in Kyrgyzstan, the Kyrgyzstan League. The club plays its home games at Suyumbayev Stadion.
