= 2006 Kyrgyzstan League =

Kyrgyzstan League
- Season: 2006
- Champions: Dordoi-Dynamo Naryn

Statistics of Kyrgyzstan League for the 2006 season.

== Overview ==
It was contested by 11 teams, and Dordoi-Dynamo Naryn won the championship.

== First stage ==
=== Group A ===
Pos	Team	Pld	W	D	L	GF	GA	GD	Pts
1	Dordoi-Dynamo Naryn	16	13	2	1	42	11	+31	41
2	Abdish-Ata Kant	16	7	6	3	45	23	+22	27
3	Muras Sport Bishkek	16	7	1	8	26	31	−5	22
4	Sher-Ak-Dan Bishkek	16	6	3	7	24	22	+2	21
5	Team Kyrgyzstan U-17	16	1	0	15	13	63	−50	3

Source: rsssf.com

=== Group B ===
Pos	Team	Pld	W	D	L	GF	GA	GD	Pts
1	Zhashtyk Ak Altyn Kara-Suu	10	8	1	1	44	8	+36	25
2	Alay Osh	10	6	1	3	37	8	+29	19
3	Shakhtyor Kizil Kiya	10	6	0	4	32	23	+9	18
4	Ak-Bura Osh	10	3	1	6	11	26	−15	10
5	Dinamo Aravan	10	3	1	6	11	36	−25	10
6	Dostuk Uzgen	10	2	0	8	14	48	−34	6

Source: rsssf.com

== Final stage ==
Pos	Team	Pld	W	D	L	GF	GA	GD	Pts
1	Dordoi-Dynamo Naryn	10	7	3	0	29	1	+28	24
2	Abdish-Ata Kant	10	7	3	0	16	2	+14	24
3	Zhashtyk Ak Altyn Kara-Suu	10	5	3	2	17	13	+4	18
4	Muras Sport Bishkek	10	2	1	7	10	29	−19	7
5	Alay Osh	10	1	3	6	8	16	−8	6
6	Sher-Ak-Dan Bishkek	10	1	1	8	7	26	−19	4

Source: rsssf.com
