= 2007 Kyrgyzstan League =

Kyrgyzstan League
- Season: 2007
- Champions: Dordoi-Dynamo Naryn

Statistics of Kyrgyzstan League for the 2007 season.

== Overview ==
It was performed in 10 teams, and Dordoi-Dynamo Naryn won the championship.

== League standings ==
Pos	Team	Pld	W	D	L	GF	GA	GD	Pts
1	Dordoi-Dynamo Naryn	32	24	4	4	73	19	+54	76
2	Abdish-Ata Kant	32	20	7	5	65	23	+42	67
3	Zhashtyk Ak Altyn Kara-Suu	32	16	7	9	58	39	+19	55
4	Lokomotiv Jalalabad	32	16	5	11	36	38	−2	53
5	Alay Osh	32	16	3	13	48	32	+16	51
6	Neftchi Kochkorata	32	12	6	14	36	30	+6	42
7	Sher-Ak-Dan Bishkek	32	11	6	15	53	48	+5	39
8	Abdish Ata FShM Kant	32	5	3	24	33	95	−62	18
9	Kant 77	32	2	3	27	11	89	−78	9
10	Aviator AAL Bishkek (W)	15	10	1	4	28	7	+21	31

Source: rsssf.com
(W) Withdrew
