= 2005 Kyrgyzstan League =

Kyrgyzstan League
- Season: 2005
- Champions: Dordoi-Dynamo Naryn

Statistics of Kyrgyzstan League for the 2005 season.

== Overview ==
It was contested by 8 teams, and Dordoi-Dynamo Naryn won the championship. Al Fagir Aravan withdrew after playing 4 matches and started playing at the Kyrgyzstan League Second Level. Remaining matches of the first quarter of the season were awarded 0–3 defeats against them

== League standings ==
Pos	Team	Pld	W	D	L	GF	GA	GD	Pts
1	Dordoi-Dynamo Naryn	24	19	3	2	67	12	+55	60
2	Shoro SKA Bishkek	24	19	3	2	55	12	+43	60
3	Zhashtyk Ak Altyn Kara-Suu	24	12	2	10	47	39	+8	38
4	Abdish-Ata Kant	24	9	4	11	40	49	−9	31
5	Alay Osh	24	7	4	13	37	56	−19	25
6	Guardia RUOR Bishkek	14	5	1	8	18	37	−19	16
7	Team Kyrgyzstan U-21	24	4	3	17	28	53	−25	15
8	Al Fagir Aravan	14	1	0	13	4	38	−34	3

Source: rsssf.com

== Championship play off ==
- Dordoi-Dynamo Naryn 1-1 (pen 4–2) Shoro SKA Bishkek
