= FC Sher Bishkek =

Kyrgyzstani football club

Sher Bishkek
- Full name: FC Sher Bishkek
- Founded: 2002; 24 years ago
- Dissolved: 2011; 15 years ago
- Ground: Dynamo Stadion; Bishkek, Kyrgyzstan
- Capacity: 10,000
- League: Kyrgyzstan League
- 2010: 5th

FC Sher Bishkek was a Kyrgyzstani football club based in Bishkek, that played in the top domestic division, the Kyrgyzstan League. The club played its home games at Dynamo Stadion.

== Name history ==
- 2002: Founded as Sher Bishkek
- 2006: Sher-Ak-Dan Bishkek
- 2007: Sher Bishkek
- 2011: Dissolved
