= 2004–05 Sun Hei SC season =

Sun Hei SC
2004–05 season
- President: Chow Man Leung
- Head coach: Koo Luam Khen
- League: Winners
- Shield: Winners
- FA Cup: Winners
- League Cup: Winners
- AFC Cup: Qualified from group stage

The 2004–05 Sun Hei SC season is the 11th season of Sun Hei SC in Hong Kong First Division League. The team was coached by Malaysian coach Koo Luam Khen.

== Squad statistics ==
No.	Pos.	Name	League		Shield		FA Cup		League Cup		AFC Cup		Total	
No.	Pos.	Name	Apps	Goals	Apps	Goals	Apps	Goals	Apps	Goals	Apps	Goals	Apps	Goals
1	GK	(Macau) Domingos Chan					1	0			N/A			
2	DF	(Hong Kong) Tseng Siu Wing					0	0				0		
3	DF	(Hong Kong) Chung Kin Hei					3	0				0		
5	DF	(Brazil) André					3	1				3		
6	MF	(Hong Kong) Lau Chi Keung					3	0				0		
7	MF	(Hong Kong) Chu Siu Kei					0 (1)	0				2		
8	DF	(Hong Kong) Pau Ka Yiu					0 (1)	0				0		
9	FW	(Cameroon) Julius Akosah					2	1				5		
11	MF	(Hong Kong) Lee Kin Wo					3	0				0		
12	MF	(Hong Kong) Wong Chun Yue					3	1				0		
14	MF	(Hong Kong) Lo Chi Kwan					0 (3)	0				0		
15	DF	(Hong Kong) Lee Wai Lun					3	0				0		
16	MF	(Hong Kong) Lai Kai Cheuk					3	0				0		
17	GK	(Hong Kong) Li Hon Ho					0	0				0		
18	FW	(Hong Kong) Chan Ho Man					1 (2)	1				0		
20	FW	(Nigeria) Cornelius Udebuluzor					3	0			N/A			
21	GK	(Hong Kong) Chan Ka Ki					2	0				0		
23	DF	(Hong Kong) Leung Chi Wing					0 (1)	0				0		
24	MF	(Hong Kong) Poon Man Tik					1 (1)	0				1		
26	MF	(Bosnia and Herzegovina) Sasa Bajkuša	0 (1)	0	0	0	0	0	0	0	N/A		0 (1)	0
33	DF	(Brazil) Cristiano Cordeiro					2	0				0		
–	–	Own goals	–		–		–	1	–		–	0	–	

Statistics accurate as of match played 31 May 2005

== Matches ==
=== Competitive ===
==== Hong Kong Senior Challenge Shield ====
14 April 2005 Quarter-final	Sun Hei	2–1	South China	Mong Kok Stadium
20:00 GMT+8	Lee Kin Wo 18'; Cornelius 38'; Lee Kin Wo (yellow card) 55'; Wong Chun Yue (yellow card) 68'; Lai Kai Cheuk (yellow card) 71'; Chung Kin Hei (yellow card) 82'	Report (Chinese)	(yellow card) 8' Yau Kin Wai; 58' Au Wai Lun; (yellow card) 64' So Yiu Man	Attendance: 936

==== Hong Kong FA Cup ====
1 May 2005 Quarter-final	Sun Hei	1–0	Fukien	Mong Kok Stadium
14:00 GMT+8	Lai Kai Cheuk (yellow card) 25'; Pau Ka Yiu (yellow card) 37'; Chan Ho Man (yellow card) 39'; Chan Ho Man 41'; Cornelius (yellow card) 74'	Report (Chinese)	(yellow card) 53' Chambers

5 May 2005 Semi-final	Sun Hei	1–0	Kitchee	Mong Kok Stadium
18:00 GMT+8	Cornelius (yellow card) 62'; Chung Kin Hei (yellow card) 65'; Akosah (yellow card) 65'; Wong Chun Yue 68'	Report (Chinese)	(yellow card) 53' Liu Quankun; (yellow card) 90+' Araújo	Attendance: 840

22 May 2005 Final	Sun Hei	2–1 (a.e.t.)	Happy Valley	Hong Kong Stadium
15:00 GMT+8	Chung Kin Hei (yellow card) 24'; Lau Chi Keung (yellow card) 31'; André (yellow card) 59'; Akosah 61'; Lee Kin Wo (yellow card) 90+1'; André 119'	Report (Chinese)	40' (o.g.) Cordeiro; (yellow card) 74' Fan Chun Yip; (yellow card) 78' Gerard; (yellow card) 102' Sham Kwok Keung; (yellow card) 118' Li Chun Yip	Attendance: 1286
