= 2006 AFC Challenge Cup squads =

Below are the squads for the 2006 AFC Challenge Cup in Bangladesh, that took place between 1 April and 16 April 2006. The players' listed age is their age on the tournament's opening day (1 April 2006).

== Group A ==
=== India ===
Coach: (Uzbekistan) Islam Akhmedov

- The AIFF sent the India U-20 team for this tournament, therefore no caps at any level are displayed.

No.	Pos.	Player	Date of birth (age)	Caps	Club
2	DF	Parwinder Singh	7 August 1985 (aged 20)	—	(India) Tata FA
3	DF	Warun Deep	19 September 1986 (aged 19)	—	(India) Churchill Brothers
4	DF	Naduparambil Pradeep (captain)	28 April 1983 (aged 22)	—	(India) State Bank of Travancore
5	DF	Rakesh Masih	18 March 1987 (aged 19)	—	(India) Tata FA
9	FW	Bungo Thomchok Singh	2 March 1983 (aged 23)	—	(India) Churchill Brothers
13	MF	Xavier Vijay Kumar	24 December 1978 (aged 27)	—	(India) HAL
14	FW	Lalawmpuia Pachuau	30 June 1989 (aged 16)	—	(India) Tata FA
15	MF	Khemtang Paite	30 August 1986 (aged 19)	—	(India) Churchill Brothers
16	MF	Ong Tshering Lepcha	11 November 1989 (aged 16)	—	(India) Churchill Brothers
17	DF	Baldeep Singh	12 January 1987 (aged 19)	—	(India) JCT FA
18	DF	Rino Anto	3 January 1988 (aged 18)	—	(India) Tata FA
20	GK	Arindam Bhattacharya	10 December 1989 (aged 16)	—	(India) Tata FA
21	GK	Shilton Pal	9 June 1988 (aged 17)	—	(India) Tata FA
23	DF	Shafeeq Pulparambil	unknown	—	(India) Kerala
24	FW	Vimal Pariyar	7 March 1986 (aged 20)	—	(India) Tata FA
25	MF	Lalramluaha	17 September 1990 (aged 15)	—	(India) Tata FA
26	FW	Reisangmei Vashum	10 January 1988 (aged 18)	—	(India) Churchill Brothers
27	DF	Zaidinmawia Hmar	unknown	—	(India) Mizoram
29	MF	Hirohito Elangbam	18 July 1987 (aged 18)	—	(India) Tata FA
30	MF	Lalmalsawma Hmar	2 December 1989 (aged 16)	—	(India) Eveready

=== Afghanistan ===
Coach: (Germany) Klaus Stärk

No.	Pos.	Player	Date of birth (age)	Caps	Club
1	GK	Shamsuddin Amiri	12 February 1985 (aged 21)	—	(Afghanistan) Kabul Bank
2	DF	Islamuddin Amiri	15 June 1984 (aged 21)	—	unknown
3	DF	Bashir Ahmad Saadat (c)	27 December 1981 (aged 24)	—	(Afghanistan) Maiwand
4	DF	Qudratullah Hussaini	11 March 1984 (aged 22)	—	unknown
5	DF	Abdul Maroof Gullestani	8 June 1986 (aged 19)	—	unknown
6	MF	Raza Mahmoudi	12 May 1984 (aged 21)	—	unknown
7	MF	Sayed Maqsood Hashemi	22 January 1985 (aged 21)	—	(Afghanistan) Maiwand
8	MF	Ahmad Wahid Abbasi	20 August 1984 (aged 21)	—	(Afghanistan) Maiwand
9	FW	Hafizullah Qadami	20 February 1985 (aged 21)	—	(Afghanistan) Kabul Bank
10	MF	Mohammad Jalal Afshar	13 April 1986 (aged 19)	—	unknown
11	DF	Ali Ahmadi	unknown	—	unknown
12	FW	Mohammad Taher Raufi	unknown	—	unknown
14	DF	Ali Yarzada	15 October 1985 (aged 20)	—	unknown
15	FW	Souraj Akhwan	15 August 1983 (aged 22)	—	unknown
16	FW	Mustafa Bayat	1 January 1985 (aged 21)	—	unknown
17	MF	Israfeel Kohistani	5 June 1987 (aged 18)	—	(Afghanistan) Ordu Kabul
18	MF	Atiqullah Usmani	unknown	—	unknown
19	DF	Mohammad Zarif Raeesi	unknown	—	unknown
21	DF	Manochahr Azizi	25 September 1984 (aged 21)	—	unknown
22	GK	Emal Gariwal	17 May 1986 (aged 19)	—	unknown

=== Chinese Taipei ===
Coach: (Japan) Toshiaki Imai

No.	Pos.	Player	Date of birth (age)	Caps	Club
1	GK	Lu Kun-chi	6 February 1985 (aged 21)	—	(Taiwan) China Steel
2	DF	Kao Hao-chieh	24 July 1980 (aged 25)	—	(Taiwan) Tatung
3	DF	Tsai Sheng-an	18 January 1985 (aged 21)	—	(Taiwan) China Steel
4	DF	Kuo Chun-yi	9 May 1982 (aged 23)	—	(Taiwan) Taipower
5	DF	Cheng Yung-jen (c)	24 January 1977 (aged 29)	—	(Taiwan) Taipower
6	MF	Feng Pao-hsing	18 August 1982 (aged 23)	—	(Taiwan) NSTC
7	MF	Huang Cheng-tsung	11 October 1985 (aged 20)	—	(Taiwan) China Steel
8	FW	Tai Hung-hsu	4 October 1987 (aged 18)	—	(Taiwan) China Steel
9	FW	Huang Tzu-jung	unknown	—	(Taiwan) NSTC
10	MF	Huang Shih-chan	8 September 1982 (aged 23)	—	(Taiwan) NSTC
11	FW	Lin Po-yuan	8 November 1982 (aged 23)	—	(Taiwan) NSTC
12	GK	Hsu Jen-feng	28 April 1979 (aged 26)	—	(Taiwan) NSTC
14	MF	Chang Fu-hsiang	15 February 1982 (aged 24)	—	(Taiwan) NSTC
16	DF	Kuo Chan-yu	8 November 1982 (aged 23)	—	(Taiwan) unknown
18	DF	Lee Meng-chian	5 December 1981 (aged 24)	—	(Taiwan) Taipower
19	FW	Chuang Wei-lun	17 March 1982 (aged 24)	—	(Taiwan) NSTC
22	MF	Tseng Tai-lin	14 May 1982 (aged 23)	—	(Taiwan) NSTC
23	MF	Liang Chien-wei	24 June 1983 (aged 22)	—	(Taiwan) NSTC
24	DF	Lin Che-min	16 December 1985 (aged 20)	—	(Taiwan) I-Shou University
30	FW	Chen Po-liang	11 February 1988 (aged 18)	—	(Taiwan) China Steel

=== Philippines ===
Coach: Jose Ariston Caslib

No.	Pos.	Player	Date of birth (age)	Caps	Club
2	DF	Bervic Italia	27 April 1982 (aged 23)	—	(Philippines) Philippine Navy
4	DF	Jesan Candolesa	15 June 1982 (aged 23)	—	(Philippines) Mendiola United
5	DF	Gerald Orcullo	19 February 1983 (aged 23)	—	(Philippines) San Beda College
6	MF	Anto Gonzales	1 May 1981 (aged 24)	—	University of the Philippines
8	DF	Mark Villon	6 July 1983 (aged 22)	—	(Philippines) Mendiola United
10	MF	Rolly Perez	24 August 1983 (aged 22)	—	(Philippines) University of the East
11	MF	Jeffrey Liman	19 May 1984 (aged 21)	—	(Philippines) San Beda College
12	DF	Wilson dela Cruz	8 May 1979 (aged 26)	—	(Philippines) Philippine Army
13	MF	Emelio Caligdong	28 September 1982 (aged 23)	—	(Philippines) Philippine Air Force
16	FW	Leigh Gunn	24 December 1980 (aged 25)	—	Unattached
17	FW	Luisito Brillantes	7 March 1976 (aged 30)	—	(Philippines) Philippine Army
18	DF	Alexander Borromeo (c)	28 June 1983 (aged 22)	—	(Philippines) Kaya
19	MF	Roel Gener	27 June 1974 (aged 31)	—	(Philippines) Philippine Army
20	FW	Ian Araneta	2 March 1982 (aged 24)	—	(Philippines) Philippine Air Force
22	GK	Eduard Sacapaño	14 February 1980 (aged 26)	—	(Philippines) Philippine Army
23	MF	Jeremias Jiao	10 November 1984 (aged 21)	—	(Philippines) Mendiola United
24	MF	Winnie Subere	2 February 1981 (aged 25)	—	(Philippines) Philippine Air Force
25	GK	Ref Cuaresma	31 October 1982 (aged 23)	—	(Philippines) Philippine Navy
26	MF	Marjo Allado	15 February 1978 (aged 28)	—	(Philippines) University of Santo Tomas
29	FW	Alvin Valeroso	25 April 1983 (aged 22)	—	(Philippines) University of the East

== Group B ==
=== Sri Lanka ===
Coach: Sampath Perera

No.	Pos.	Player	Date of birth (age)	Caps	Club
1	GK	Dammika Thilakaratne	6 October 1977 (aged 28)	—	(Sri Lanka) Ratnam SC
2	DF	Dumidu Wasanthaka	9 May 1983 (aged 22)	—	(Sri Lanka) Ratnam SC
3	DF	Fuard Kamaldeen	12 August 1979 (aged 26)	—	(Sri Lanka) Ratnam SC
4	DF	Rohana Ruwanthilaka	21 September 1984 (aged 21)	—	(Sri Lanka) Red Sun SC
6	MF	Mohamed Izzadeen	8 June 1979 (aged 26)	—	(Sri Lanka) Ratnam SC
7	MF	Chathura Maduranga	28 January 1981 (aged 25)	—	(Sri Lanka) Ratnam SC
8	MF	Rajitha Jayawilal	22 July 1979 (aged 26)	—	(Sri Lanka) Police SC
9	FW	Chandradasa Karunaratne	29 January 1972 (aged 34)	—	(Sri Lanka) Negombo Youth SC
10	FW	Channa Ediri Bandanage	22 September 1978 (aged 27)	—	(Maldives) Victory SC
11	FW	Kasun Jayasuriya	25 March 1980 (aged 26)	—	(India) Dempo SC
12	FW	Nuwantha Charaka	20 October 1986 (aged 19)	—	(Sri Lanka) Police SC
14	MF	Fazlur Rahman	15 May 1977 (aged 28)	—	(Sri Lanka) Ratnam SC
15	FW	Dhammika Rathnayaka	25 August 1977 (aged 28)	—	(Sri Lanka) Negombo Youth SC
16	DF	Nisal Nilanga	2 August 1983 (aged 22)	—	(Sri Lanka) Saunders SC
17	MF	Chathura Gunarathna	8 September 1982 (aged 23)	—	(Sri Lanka) Negombo Youth SC
18	DF	Pradeep Kumara	8 August 1982 (aged 23)	—	(Sri Lanka) Police SC
19	FW	Nimal Fernando	12 October 1984 (aged 21)	—	(Sri Lanka) Negombo Youth SC
22	GK	Viraj Asanka	17 May 1987 (aged 18)	—	(Sri Lanka) Saunders SC
23	DF	Dudley Lincoln Steinwall (c)	9 November 1974 (aged 31)	—	(Sri Lanka) Negombo Youth SC
25	GK	Ajith Kumara	1 July 1985 (aged 20)	—	(Sri Lanka) Navy SC

=== Brunei ===
Coach: Mohd Ali Mustafa

No.	Pos.	Player	Date of birth (age)	Caps	Club
1	GK	Mohd Sahan Mumtazali	5 March 1986 (aged 20)	—	(Brunei) QAF
2	MF	Mardi Bujang	19 October 1984 (aged 21)	—	(Brunei) Wijaya
3	DF	Sallehuddin Damit	5 November 1973 (aged 32)	—	(Brunei) DPMM
4	MF	Mohd Fadzri Ibrahim		—	(Brunei) QAF
5	DF	Mohd Safari Wahit	2 April 1978 (aged 27)	—	(Brunei) QAF
6	DF	Philip Anak Ahar	11 December 1983 (aged 22)	—	(Brunei) QAF
7	DF	Christopher Ambon		—	(Brunei) QAF
8	FW	Hardi Bujang	19 October 1984 (aged 21)	—	(Brunei) Wijaya
9	FW	Riwandi Wahit (c)	6 March 1981 (aged 25)	—	(Brunei) QAF
10	MF	Mohd Hardiman Abdul Lamit	19 June 1986 (aged 19)	—	(Brunei) QAF
12	FW	Mohammad Helmi Zambrin	30 March 1987 (aged 19)	—	(Brunei) AH United
13	DF	Shahbri Jalil		—	(Brunei) QAF
15	MF	Yunus Lupat	27 October 1984 (aged 21)	—	(Brunei) QAF
16	DF	Mohd Sabri Alimin		—	(Brunei) QAF
17	DF	Mohd Kamarul Ariffin Ramlee	17 January 1987 (aged 19)	—	(Brunei) QAF
19	MF	Ratano Tuah	9 February 1976 (aged 30)	—	(Brunei) QAF
20	MF	Azwan Saleh	6 January 1988 (aged 18)	—	(Brunei) DPMM
21	FW	Adie Arsham Salleh	6 January 1988 (aged 18)	—	(Brunei) QAF
23	MF	Kamarulzaman Kamaludin	6 December 1984 (aged 21)	—	(Brunei) QAF
25	GK	Azman Ilham Noor	17 February 1984 (aged 22)	—	(Brunei) DPMM

=== Nepal ===
Coach: Shyam Thapa

No.	Pos.	Player	Date of birth (age)	Caps	Club
1	GK	Bikash Malla	15 August 1985 (aged 20)	—	(Nepal) Manang Marsyangdi
3	DF	Suman Subedi	27 July 1988 (aged 17)	—	(Nepal) Mahendra Police
4	DF	Nabin Neupane	13 October 1982 (aged 23)	—	(Nepal) Manang Marsyangdi
5	DF	K.C. Anjan	14 December 1986 (aged 19)	—	(Nepal) Friends Club
6	DF	Lok Bandhu Gurung	29 August 1985 (aged 20)	—	(Nepal) Three Star
7	FW	Surendra Bahadur Tamang	23 February 1981 (aged 25)	—	(Nepal) Three Star
8	MF	Rajesh Khadagi	31 January 1980 (aged 26)	—	(Nepal) Three Star
9	FW	Ju Manu Rai	1 March 1983 (aged 23)	—	(Nepal) Mahendra Police
10	FW	Ramesh Budhathoki	11 April 1978 (aged 27)	—	(Nepal) Mahendra Police
11	FW	Hari Khadka	26 November 1976 (aged 29)	—	(Nepal) Mahendra Police
12	MF	Raju Tamang	27 October 1985 (aged 20)	—	(Nepal) Tribhuvan Army
13	MF	Thakali	11 May 1984 (aged 21)	—	(Nepal) Three Star
14	DF	Tashi Tsering	22 April 1973 (aged 32)	—	(Nepal) Manang Marsyangdi
17	MF	Pradeep Maharajan	11 October 1986 (aged 19)	—	(Nepal) Three Star
19	DF	Sagar Thapa	19 April 1985 (aged 20)	—	(Nepal) Manang Marsyangdi
20	GK	Ritesh Thapa	2 October 1984 (aged 21)	—	(Nepal) Mahendra Police
22	FW	Basanta Thapa (c)	10 April 1977 (aged 28)	—	(Nepal) Manang Marsyangdi
23	MF	Bijay Gurung	11 October 1985 (aged 20)	—	(Nepal) Three Star
26	DF	Ram Kumar Biswash	30 November 1979 (aged 26)	—	(Nepal) Tribhuvan Army
30	GK	Surendra Kumar Shrestha	6 February 1980 (aged 26)	—	(Nepal) New Road

=== Bhutan ===
Coach: Kharga Basnet

No.	Pos.	Player	Date of birth (age)	Caps	Club
1	GK	Jigme Singye	8 June 1981 (aged 24)	—	(Bhutan) Yeedzin
2	DF	Sangay Khandu	7 September 1985 (aged 20)	—	(Bhutan) Transport United
3	DF	Tandin Tshering	1 January 1983 (aged 23)	—	
4	DF	Pema	5 July 1985 (aged 20)	—	(Bhutan) Transport United
5	MF	Passang Tshering	28 October 1975 (aged 30)	—	(Bhutan) Transport United
6	DF	Kinley Wangchuk	10 April 1986 (aged 19)	—	(Bhutan) Yeedzin
7	MF	Kinley Dorji	2 December 1981 (aged 24)	—	(Bhutan) Transport United
8	MF	Wangchuk	10 April 1986 (aged 19)	—	
9	FW	Bikash Pradhan	7 February 1985 (aged 21)	—	(Bhutan) Transport United
10	FW	Wangay Dorji (c)	9 January 1974 (aged 32)	—	(Bhutan) Transport United
12	MF	Gyeltshen	7 June 1986 (aged 19)	—	(Bhutan) Transport United
13	MF	Sonam Tenzin	20 October 1986 (aged 19)	—	(India) Buddhist Blue Stars
15	DF	Ugyen Dorji	6 July 1985 (aged 20)	—	(Bhutan) Transport United
16	MF	Nawang Dendup	7 December 1986 (aged 19)	—	(Nepal) New Road
18	DF	Karun Gurung	9 June 1986 (aged 19)	—	
20	DF	Karma Sherub		—	
21	GK	Karma Thinley		—	
24	MF	Ashok Burja		—	
25	MF	Jigme Gyeltshen	5 September 1984 (aged 21)		(Bhutan) Transport United

== Group C ==
=== Bangladesh ===
Coach: (Argentina) Diego Cruciani

No.	Pos.	Player	Date of birth (age)	Caps	Club
1	GK	Aminul Hoque	5 October 1980 (aged 25)	—	(Bangladesh) Brothers Union
3	DF	Abu Ahmed Faysal	11 June 1972 (aged 33)	—	(Bangladesh) Brothers Union
4	DF	Rajani Kanta Barman	12 May 1976 (aged 29)	—	(Bangladesh) Muktijoddha
5	DF	Nazrul Islam	16 October 1978 (aged 27)	—	(Bangladesh) Mohammedan Dhaka
10	MF	Alfaz Ahmed	6 June 1973 (aged 32)	—	(Bangladesh) Mohammedan Dhaka
11	FW	Rokonuzzaman Kanchan	22 June 1982 (aged 23)	—	(Bangladesh) Muktijoddha
12	MF	Mohammed Monwar Hossain	30 August 1979 (aged 26)	—	(Bangladesh) Brothers Union
13	MF	Arif Khan Joy (c)	20 November 1971 (aged 34)	—	(Bangladesh) Abahani Dhaka
14	DF	Mustafa Parvez	25 July 1982 (aged 23)	—	(Bangladesh) Brothers Union
15	MF	Arman Aziz	10 May 1984 (aged 21)	—	(Bangladesh) Mohammedan Dhaka
16	MF	Mohamed Abul Hossain	29 July 1983 (aged 22)	—	(Bangladesh) Brothers Union
17	FW	Mehedi Hasan Ujjal	26 April 1985 (aged 20)	—	(Bangladesh) Abahani Dhaka
18	MF	Asadur Rahman Asad	26 August 1982 (aged 23)	—	(Bangladesh) Mohammedan Dhaka
20	GK	Biplob Bhattacharjee	7 January 1981 (aged 25)	—	(Bangladesh) Mohammedan Dhaka
21	FW	Zahid Hasan Ameli	25 December 1987 (aged 18)	—	(Bangladesh) Abahani Dhaka
25	DF	Mohiuddin Ibnul Siraji	25 July 1985 (aged 20)	—	(Bangladesh) Brothers Union
26	FW	Mehedi Hassan Tapu	25 September 1984 (aged 21)	—	(Bangladesh) Narayan
27	MF	Zahid Parvez Chowdhury	29 December 1987 (aged 18)	—	(Bangladesh) Abahani Dhaka
29	MF	Shahriar Abdullah Rintu	24 July 1984 (aged 21)	—	(Bangladesh) Arambagh
30	DF	Waly Faisal	1 March 1985 (aged 21)	—	(Bangladesh) Abahani Dhaka

=== Cambodia ===
Coach: (South Korea) Jo Yong-Chol

No.	Pos.	Player	Date of birth (age)	Caps	Club
1	GK	Mak Theara		—	
2	MF	Keo Kosal	13 June 1986 (aged 19)	—	(Cambodia) Khemara
3	DF	Lar Pichseyla		—	(Cambodia) Khemara
4	FW	Kouch Sokumpheak	15 February 1987 (aged 19)	—	(Cambodia) Khemara
5	MF	Sam Minar	27 March 1986 (aged 20)	—	(Cambodia) Khemara
6	DF	San Narith	7 November 1986 (aged 19)	—	(Cambodia) Khemara
7	MF	Ty Bunvichet	10 February 1985 (aged 21)	—	(Cambodia) Khemara
8	MF	Pok Chanthan	1 December 1982 (aged 23)	—	(Cambodia) Khemara
9	MF	Seng Narath (c)	7 December 1982 (aged 23)	—	(Cambodia) Khemara
10	DF	Om Thavrak	25 June 1985 (aged 20)	—	(Cambodia) Khemara
11	MF	Chan Rithy	11 November 1983 (aged 22)	—	(Cambodia) Khemara
13	MF	Sok Buntheang	25 August 1983 (aged 22)	—	(Cambodia) Khemara
14	FW	Srey Veasna	6 December 1980 (aged 25)	—	(Cambodia) Khemara
16	DF	Thul Sothearith	28 November 1985 (aged 20)	—	(Cambodia) Khemara
17	DF	Hout Sokunthea	20 October 1990 (aged 15)	—	(Cambodia) Phnom Penh United
20	DF	Chea Veasna	10 December 1982 (aged 23)	—	(Cambodia) Khemara
22	DF	Tieng Tiny	9 June 1986 (aged 19)	—	(Cambodia) Khemara
25	GK	Ouk Mic	15 September 1983 (aged 22)	—	(Cambodia) Khemara

=== Palestine ===
Coach: Mohammed Sabaah

No.	Pos.	Player	Date of birth (age)	Caps	Club
2	DF	Francisco Atura	1 August 1979 (aged 26)	—	(Chile) Unión San Felipe
3	DF	Hamada Eshbair	9 March 1980 (aged 26)	—	(Palestine) Khidmat Al-Shatia
5	DF	Saeb Jendeya (c)	13 May 1975 (aged 30)	—	(Palestine) Ittihad Al-Shajaiya
8	MF	Ibrahim Al-Sweirki	13 June 1979 (aged 26)	—	(Palestine) Ittihad Al-Shajaiya
10	MF	Khaldun Al-Waara	15 March 1975 (aged 31)	—	
12	MF	Fady Salem	20 July 1979 (aged 26)	—	(Palestine) Merkaz Tulkarem
14	MF	Mohanad Omar	16 February 1980 (aged 26)	—	(Palestine) Thaqafi Tulkarem
16	FW	Fahed Attal	1 January 1985 (aged 21)	—	(Jordan) Al-Jazeera
18	DF	Ismail Al-Amour	2 October 1984 (aged 21)	—	(Palestine) Al-Mashtal
19	DF	Ammar Abu Seleisel	10 March 1984 (aged 22)	—	(Palestine) Hilal Areeha
20	MF	Ahmed Keshkesh	15 September 1984 (aged 21)	—	(Palestine) Al-Hilal Gaza
21	GK	Ramzi Saleh	8 August 1980 (aged 25)	—	(Palestine) Shabab Jabalaya
22	GK	Iyad Dwaima	5 December 1978 (aged 27)	—	(Palestine) Ittihad Al-Shajaiya
24	MF	Pablo Abdala	6 May 1972 (aged 33)	—	(Argentina) Argentino de Rosario
28	FW	Mohammed Abu Keshek		—	(Palestine) Thaqafi Tulkarem
29	FW	Ziyad Al-Kord	15 January 1974 (aged 32)	—	(Jordan) Al-Wihdat
30	GK	Mohammed Shbair	6 December 1986 (aged 19)	—	(Palestine) Ittihad Khan Younes
33	FW	Roberto Beshe	25 July 1981 (aged 24)	—	(Chile) Unión Española

=== Guam ===
Coach: (Japan) Norio Tsukitate

No.	Pos.	Player	Date of birth (age)	Caps	Club
1	GK	Brett Maluwelmeng	19 February 1985 (aged 21)	—	(Guam) Quality Distributors
2	DF	James Bush	15 July 1983 (aged 22)	—	(Guam) Quality Distributors
3	DF	Jason Landstrom	12 January 1987 (aged 19)	—	(United States) Wenatchee Valley College
4	MF	Jerome Unpingco	19 March 1984 (aged 22)	—	Guam Shipyard
6	MF	Ric-Francis Mantanona	25 May 1986 (aged 19)	—	(Guam) Quality Distributors
7	DF	Sho Hammond	14 February 1988 (aged 18)	—	Guam U18
8	MF	Alan Jamison	10 May 1981 (aged 24)	—	(Guam) Quality Distributors
9	FW	Randy Espinosa	22 August 1988 (aged 17)	—	Guam U18
12	DF	Dominic Gadia (c)	18 January 1986 (aged 20)	—	(Guam) Quality Distributors
14	MF	Uri Schallhorn	10 October 1974 (aged 31)	—	(Guam) Quality Distributors
15	MF	Pelé Torres	10 August 1988 (aged 17)	—	Guam U18
16	DF	Christopher Santos	17 February 1982 (aged 24)	—	Guam Shipyard
18	FW	Carlo Unpingco	5 April 1980 (aged 25)	—	Guam Shipyard
19	FW	Elias Merfalen	7 September 1989 (aged 16)	—	(Guam) Crushers
20	GK	Joseph Laanan	14 February 1982 (aged 24)	—	Guam Shipyard
21	FW	Jared Quichocho		—	Guam Shipyard
23	MF	Jason Cunliffe	23 October 1983 (aged 22)	—	(Guam) Quality Distributors
29	DF	Craig Wade	19 December 1968 (aged 37)	—	(Guam) Carpet Masters

== Group D ==
=== Tajikistan ===
Coach: Sharif Nazarov

No.	Pos.	Player	Date of birth (age)	Caps	Club
1	GK	Asliddin Khabibullaev (c)	5 March 1971 (aged 35)	—	(Tajikistan) Vakhsh
2	DF	Farrukh Choriev	24 July 1984 (aged 21)	—	(Tajikistan) Regar-TadAZ
3	DF	Iskandar Nuridinov	23 January 1984 (aged 22)	—	(Tajikistan) Vakhsh
4	DF	Subkhon Khujamov	10 July 1976 (aged 29)	—	(Tajikistan) SKA Pomir
5	DF	Alexei Negmatov	4 January 1986 (aged 20)	—	(Tajikistan) Vakhsh
6	DF	Naim Nosirov	28 April 1986 (aged 19)	—	(Tajikistan) Regar-TadAZ
7	MF	Ibrahim Rabimov	3 August 1987 (aged 18)	—	(Tajikistan) Regar-TadAZ
9	MF	Khurshed Mahmudov	8 August 1982 (aged 23)	—	(Tajikistan) Regar-TadAZ
10	FW	Shukhrat Dzhabarov	30 November 1976 (aged 29)	—	(Tajikistan) Regar-TadAZ
11	FW	Shujoat Nematov	26 September 1981 (aged 24)	—	(Tajikistan) Regar-TadAZ
15	FW	Numonjon Hakimov	5 September 1978 (aged 27)	—	(Tajikistan) Parvoz Bobojon
16	GK	Alexandr Mukanin	24 August 1978 (aged 27)	—	(Tajikistan) Regar-TadAZ
17	DF	Dzhamolidin Oev	1 March 1976 (aged 30)	—	(Tajikistan) Hima
18	FW	Dzhomikhon Mukhidinov	15 April 1976 (aged 29)	—	(Tajikistan) Khujand
19	DF	Odil Irgashev	10 February 1977 (aged 29)	—	(Kyrgyzstan) Zhashtyk Ak Altyn
20	MF	Yusuf Rabiev	24 December 1979 (aged 26)	—	(Tajikistan) Parvoz Bobojon
21	MF	Rustam Khojaev	2 January 1973 (aged 33)	—	(Tajikistan) Regar-TadAZ
22	FW	Mahmadali Sodikov	20 March 1984 (aged 22)	—	(Tajikistan) Khujand
25	DF	Rustam Tabarov	8 March 1979 (aged 27)	—	(Tajikistan) Regar-TadAZ
27	FW	Kamil Saidov	25 January 1989 (aged 17)	—	(Tajikistan) Hima

=== Macau ===
Coach: (Japan) Masanaga Kageyama

No.	Pos.	Player	Date of birth (age)	Caps	Club
1	GK	William Chu	16 July 1971 (aged 34)	—	(Macau) Lam Pak
3	DF	Ku Weng Nin	17 February 1977 (aged 29)	—	(Macau) Kin Chong
6	DF	Lao Pak Kin	24 May 1984 (aged 21)	—	(Macau) Ka I
8	MF	Paulo Cheang	18 August 1984 (aged 21)	—	(Macau) Monte Carlo
10	MF	Geofredo de Sousa (c)	18 May 1979 (aged 26)	—	(Macau) Monte Carlo
11	FW	Cheang Chon Man	30 July 1972 (aged 33)	—	(Macau) Lam Pak
12	MF	Leong Lap San	2 November 1980 (aged 25)	—	(Macau) Polícia
14	MF	Luis Hung	6 May 1986 (aged 19)	—	(Macau) MFA Development
15	FW	Mok Kin Fong	6 March 1980 (aged 26)	—	(Macau) Lam Pak
16	FW	Lei Fu Weng	23 October 1986 (aged 19)	—	Benfica de Macau
19	FW	Chan Kin Seng	19 March 1985 (aged 21)	—	(Macau) Monte Carlo
21	MF	Kong Cheng Hou	2 August 1986 (aged 19)	—	(Macau) Monte Carlo
23	DF	Chan Man Hei	1 September 1980 (aged 25)	—	(Macau) Bombeiros
24	DF	Lam Ka Pou	10 July 1985 (aged 20)	—	(Macau) Lam Pak
26	DF	Un Tak Ian	9 November 1986 (aged 19)	—	(Macau) MFA Development
28	FW	Ho Man Hou	5 November 1988 (aged 17)	—	(Macau) MFA Development

=== Kyrgyzstan ===
Coach: Boris Podkorytov

No.	Pos.	Player	Date of birth (age)	Caps	Club
1	GK	Vladislav Volkov	15 August 1980 (aged 25)	—	(Kyrgyzstan) Dordoi-Dynamo
2	DF	Vyacheslav Amin	10 December 1976 (aged 29)	—	(Kyrgyzstan) Abdish-Ata
3	DF	Talant Samsaliev	27 April 1980 (aged 25)	—	(Kyrgyzstan) Dordoi-Dynamo
4	DF	Ruslan Sydykov (c)	4 January 1975 (aged 31)	—	(Kyrgyzstan) Dordoi-Dynamo
5	MF	Sergey Kniazev	8 October 1981 (aged 24)	—	(Kyrgyzstan) Dordoi-Dynamo
6	MF	Sardorbek Askarov	17 February 1987 (aged 19)	—	(Kyrgyzstan) Dordoi-Dynamo
7	MF	Azamat Ishenbaev	19 June 1978 (aged 27)	—	(Kyrgyzstan) Dordoi-Dynamo
8	DF	Timur Valiev	27 July 1984 (aged 21)	—	(Kyrgyzstan) Abdish-Ata
9	MF	Vadim Harchenko	28 May 1984 (aged 21)	—	(Kyrgyzstan) Dordoi-Dynamo
10	MF	Ruslan Djamshidov	22 August 1979 (aged 26)	—	(Kyrgyzstan) Dordoi-Dynamo
11	FW	Roman Kornilov	30 March 1981 (aged 25)	—	(Kyrgyzstan) Dordoi-Dynamo
12	MF	Aibek Bokoev	19 June 1978 (aged 27)	—	(Kyrgyzstan) Dordoi-Dynamo
13	DF	Igor Kudrenko	13 November 1978 (aged 27)	—	(Kyrgyzstan) Dordoi-Dynamo
14	FW	Ildar Amirov	9 October 1987 (aged 18)	—	(Kyrgyzstan) Muras-Sport
15	FW	Vladimir Verevkin	8 May 1987 (aged 18)	—	(Kyrgyzstan) Muras-Sport
16	GK	Pavel Matiash	11 July 1987 (aged 18)	—	(Kyrgyzstan) Dordoi-Dynamo
17	DF	Davron Askarov	6 January 1988 (aged 18)	—	(Kyrgyzstan) Zhashtyk Ak Altyn
18	FW	Andrey Krasnov	6 July 1981 (aged 24)	—	(Kyrgyzstan) Dordoi-Dynamo
19	MF	Roman Ablakimov	28 August 1987 (aged 18)	—	(Kyrgyzstan) Muras-Sport
20	DF	Stepan Miagkih	5 February 1987 (aged 19)	—	(Kyrgyzstan) Dordoi-Dynamo

=== Pakistan ===
Coach: (Bahrain) Salman Sharida

No.	Pos.	Player	Date of birth (age)	Caps	Club
1	GK	Jaffar Khan (c)	10 March 1981 (aged 25)	—	Pakistan Army
2	DF	Naveed Akram	16 May 1984 (aged 21)	—	(Pakistan) WAPDA
4	DF	Muhammad Shahid	10 October 1985 (aged 20)	—	(Pakistan) WAPDA
5	DF	Samar Ishaq	1 January 1986 (aged 20)	—	(Pakistan) Panther FC
7	MF	Zahid Hameed	1 August 1985 (aged 20)	—	(Pakistan) WAPDA
8	MF	Farooq Shah	19 October 1985 (aged 20)	—	(Pakistan) NBP
9	FW	Imran Hussain	20 August 1986 (aged 19)	—	Pakistan Army
10	FW	Muhammad Essa	20 November 1983 (aged 22)	—	(Pakistan) WAPDA
11	MF	Abdul Aziz	11 January 1986 (aged 20)	—	(Pakistan) NBP
12	FW	Naveed Khan	20 October 1984 (aged 21)	—	Pakistan Army
14	DF	Mohammad Imran	15 October 1986 (aged 19)	—	Pakistan Army
15	DF	Zubair Moazzam		—	(Pakistan) PIA
19	MF	Khalid Munir	15 January 1987 (aged 19)	—	Pakistan Army
20	FW	Faheem Riaz	25 June 1985 (aged 20)	—	Pakistan Army
22	MF	Javed Hamza	5 August 1988 (aged 17)	—	(Pakistan) KESC
24	MF	Abbas Ali	3 September 1990 (aged 15)	—	(Pakistan) NBP
25	GK	Aqeel Ahmed		—	(Pakistan) HBL
26	MF	Asif Ayub	3 February 1985 (aged 21)	—	(Pakistan) KPT
27	DF	Zeeshan Aslam		—	(Pakistan) WAPDA
30	DF	Adeel Ahmed	25 April 1983 (aged 22)	—	(Pakistan) PTCL
