= 2003 East Asian Football Championship =

東アジアサッカー選手権2003

Tournament details
- Host country: Japan
- Dates: 22 February – 2 March 2003 (qualifiers); 4–10 December 2003 (finals)
- Teams: 8 (from 1 confederation)
- Venue: 4 (in 4 host cities)

Final positions
- Champions: South Korea (1st title)
- Runners-up: Japan
- Third place: China
- Fourth place: Hong Kong

Tournament statistics
- Matches played: 16
- Goals scored: 58 (3.63 per match)
- Attendance: 209,530 (13,096 per match)
- Top scorer: (Japan) Tatsuhiko Kubo (2 goals)
- Best player: (South Korea) Yoo Sang-chul
- Best goalkeeper: (Japan) Seigo Narazaki

The 2003 East Asian Football Championship was the 1st edition of the East Asian Football Championship, an international football tournament for East Asian countries and territories organized by the EAFF. The qualifiers were held in February and March 2003 in Hong Kong and the final was held in December 2003 in Japan. South Korea won the inaugural championship.

China PR, South Korea, and Japan were the direct finalists. The fourth finalist spot was competed among Chinese Taipei, Guam, Hong Kong, Macau and Mongolia. Hong Kong won the qualifiers.

== Participating teams ==
=== Preliminary ===
- Chinese Taipei
- Guam
- Hong Kong
- Macau
- Mongolia

=== Finals ===
- China – 2002 FIFA World Cup participating team
- Hong Kong – Winner of preliminary competition
- Japan – 2002 FIFA World Cup participating team
- South Korea – 2002 FIFA World Cup participating team

== Venues ==
=== Preliminary competition ===
Hong Kong
Hong Kong Stadium
Capacity: 40,000
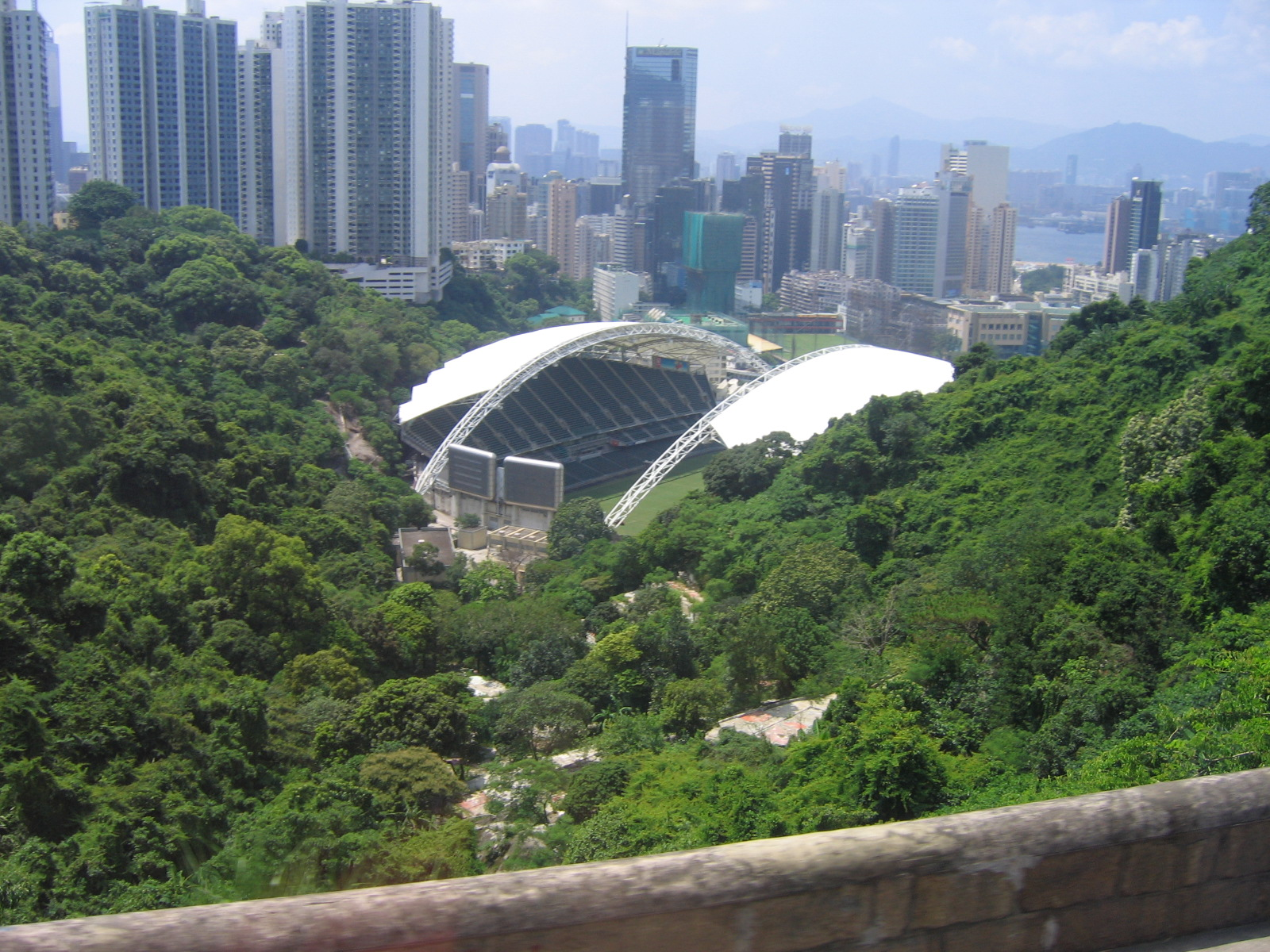

=== Finals ===
Tokyo	Saitama	Yokohama
National Stadium	Saitama Stadium 2002	International Stadium
Capacity: 57,363	Capacity: 63,700	Capacity: 72,327

== Preliminary competition ==
The Preliminary competition was hosted by Hong Kong. The winner of the group advanced to the finals. North Korea withdrew from the tournament.

All times are local (HKT, UTC+08:00).

Team	Pld	W	D	L	GF	GA	GD	Pts
Hong Kong	4	4	0	0	26	0	+26	12
Chinese Taipei	4	3	0	1	13	3	+10	9
Macau	4	2	0	2	5	5	+0	6
Mongolia	4	1	0	3	2	16	−14	3
Guam	4	0	0	4	0	22	−22	0

22 February 2003
13:30

Macau	2–0	Mongolia
Che Chi Man 34' (pen.); Chan Man Hei 82'

Hong Kong Stadium, Hong Kong
Attendance: 6,055
Referee: Chan Siu Kee (Hong Kong)
22 February 2003
16:00

Hong Kong	2–0	Chinese Taipei
Kwok Yue Hung 77'; Lee Wai Man 79'

Hong Kong Stadium, Hong Kong
Attendance: 6,055
Referee: Kazuhiko Matsumura (Japan)

24 February 2003
13:30

Mongolia	2–0	Guam
Tugsbayar 52'; Lumbengarav 59'

Hong Kong Stadium, Hong Kong
Attendance: 1,602
Referee: Huang Junjie (China)
24 February 2003
16:00

Hong Kong	3–0	Macau
Lee Kin Wo 46' (pen.); Au Wai Lun 59', 62'

Hong Kong Stadium, Hong Kong
Attendance: 1,602
Referee: Park Sang-Gu (Korea Rep.)

26 February 2003
13:30

Guam	0–2	Macau
		Geofredo Cheung 37', 77'

Hong Kong Stadium, Hong Kong
Attendance: 672
Referee: Cheung Yim Yau (Hong Kong)
26 February 2003
16:00

Chinese Taipei	4–0	Mongolia
Huang Che-ming 26', 54'; Chiang Shih-lu 71'; Yang Cheng-hsing 90' (pen.)

Hong Kong Stadium, Hong Kong
Attendance: 672
Referee: Chan Siu Kee (Hong Kong)

28 February 2003
13:30

Guam	0–7	Chinese Taipei
		Tu Chu-hsien 24', 34'; Sheu Sheau-bao 48', 54', 90'; Hsu Jui-chen 55'; Tu Ming-feng 64'

Hong Kong Stadium, Hong Kong
Attendance: 1,814
28 February 2003
16:00

Hong Kong	10–0	Mongolia
Au Wai Lun 6', 53'; Yau Kin Wai 10'; Chan Ho Man 12', 40', 42'; Cheung Sai Ho 13', 26' (pen.), 90'; Kwok Yue Hung 79'

Hong Kong Stadium, Hong Kong
Attendance: 1,814

2 March 2003
13:30

Macau	1–2	Chinese Taipei
Hoi Man Io 35'		Wu Chun-I 43'; Huang Che-ming 53'

Hong Kong Stadium, Hong Kong
Attendance: 6,862
2 March 2003
16:00

Hong Kong	11–0	Guam
Lau Chi Keung 7', 35', 56'; Au Wai Lun 8', 61', 86' (pen.); Chan Chi Hong 40'; Poon Yiu Cheuk 42'; Chan Ho Man 46', 58'; Lee Wai Man 90'

Hong Kong Stadium, Hong Kong
Attendance: 6,862
Referee: Huang Junjie (China)

=== Personal awards ===
Best Goalkeeper	Best Defender	Top Scorer	Most Valuable Player
(Macau) Domingos Chan	(Chinese Taipei) Cheng Yung-jen	(Hong Kong) Au Wai Lun	(Hong Kong) Cheung Sai Ho

== Finals ==
=== Matches ===
All times are local (JST, UTC+09:00).

Team	Pld	W	D	L	GF	GA	GD	Pts
South Korea	3	2	1	0	4	1	+3	7
Japan	3	2	1	0	3	0	+3	7
China	3	1	0	2	3	4	–1	3
Hong Kong	3	0	0	3	2	7	–5	0

4 December 2003
16:30

Hong Kong	1–3	South Korea
Akandu 34'	Report	Kim Do-heon 23'; Kim Do-hoon 50'; Ahn Jung-hwan 57'

National Stadium, Tokyo
Attendance: 14,895
Referee: Jimmy Napitupulu (Indonesia)
4 December 2003
19:15

Japan	2–0	China
Kubo 4', 80'	Report

National Stadium, Tokyo
Attendance: 41,742
Referee: Santhan Nagalingam (Singapore)

7 December 2003
16:30

South Korea	1–0	China
Yoo Sang-chul 45+1'	Report

Saitama Stadium 2002, Saitama
Attendance: 27,715
Referee: Halim Abdul Hamid (Malaysia)
7 December 2003
19:16

Japan	1–0	Hong Kong
Alex 37' (pen.)	Report

Saitama Stadium 2002, Saitama
Attendance: 45,145
Referee: Chalach Piromya (Thailand)

10 December 2003
16:28

China	3–1	Hong Kong
Zhao Xuri 20'; Liu Jindong 21'; Yang Chen 44'	Report	Lo Chi Kwan 75'

International Stadium, Yokohama
Attendance: 17,400
Referee: Chalach Piromya (Thailand)
10 December 2003
19:16

Japan	0–0	South Korea
	Report

International Stadium, Yokohama
Attendance: 62,633
Referee: Santhan Nagalingam (Singapore)

== Final standing ==
Rank	Team
1	South Korea
2	Japan
3	China
4	Hong Kong
5	Chinese Taipei
6	Macau
7	Mongolia
8	Guam
