= 2008 East Asian Football Championship =

2008年东亚足球锦标赛

Tournament details
- Host country: China
- City: Chongqing
- Dates: 25 March – 24 June 2007 (qualifiers); 17–23 February 2008 (finals)
- Teams: 10 (from 1 confederation)
- Venues: 4 (in 4 host cities)

Final positions
- Champions: South Korea (2nd title)
- Runners-up: Japan
- Third place: China
- Fourth place: North Korea

Tournament statistics
- Matches played: 17
- Goals scored: 90 (5.29 per match)
- Attendance: 157,500 (9,265 per match)
- Top scorer(s): (South Korea) Yeom Ki-hun (South Korea) Park Chu-young (Japan) Koji Yamase (North Korea) Jong Tae-se (2 goals each)
- Best player: (South Korea) Kim Nam-il
- Best goalkeeper: (North Korea) Ri Myong-guk

The 2008 EAFF East Asian Football Championship was held between 17 February and 23 February 2008. The preliminary competitions were held from 25 March to 24 June 2007.

== Participating teams ==
=== Preliminary ===
==== Stage One ====
- Guam
- Northern Mariana Islands

==== Stage Two ====
- Chinese Taipei
- Guam - Winner of Preliminary Competition Stage One
- Hong Kong
- Mongolia
- Macau
- North Korea

=== Finals ===
- China – 2005 East Asian Football Championship Winners
- North Korea – Winner of Preliminary Competition Stage Two
- Japan – 2006 FIFA World Cup participating team
- South Korea – 2006 FIFA World Cup participating team

== Venues ==
=== Preliminary Competition ===
Macau
Macau Stadium
Capacity: 16,000
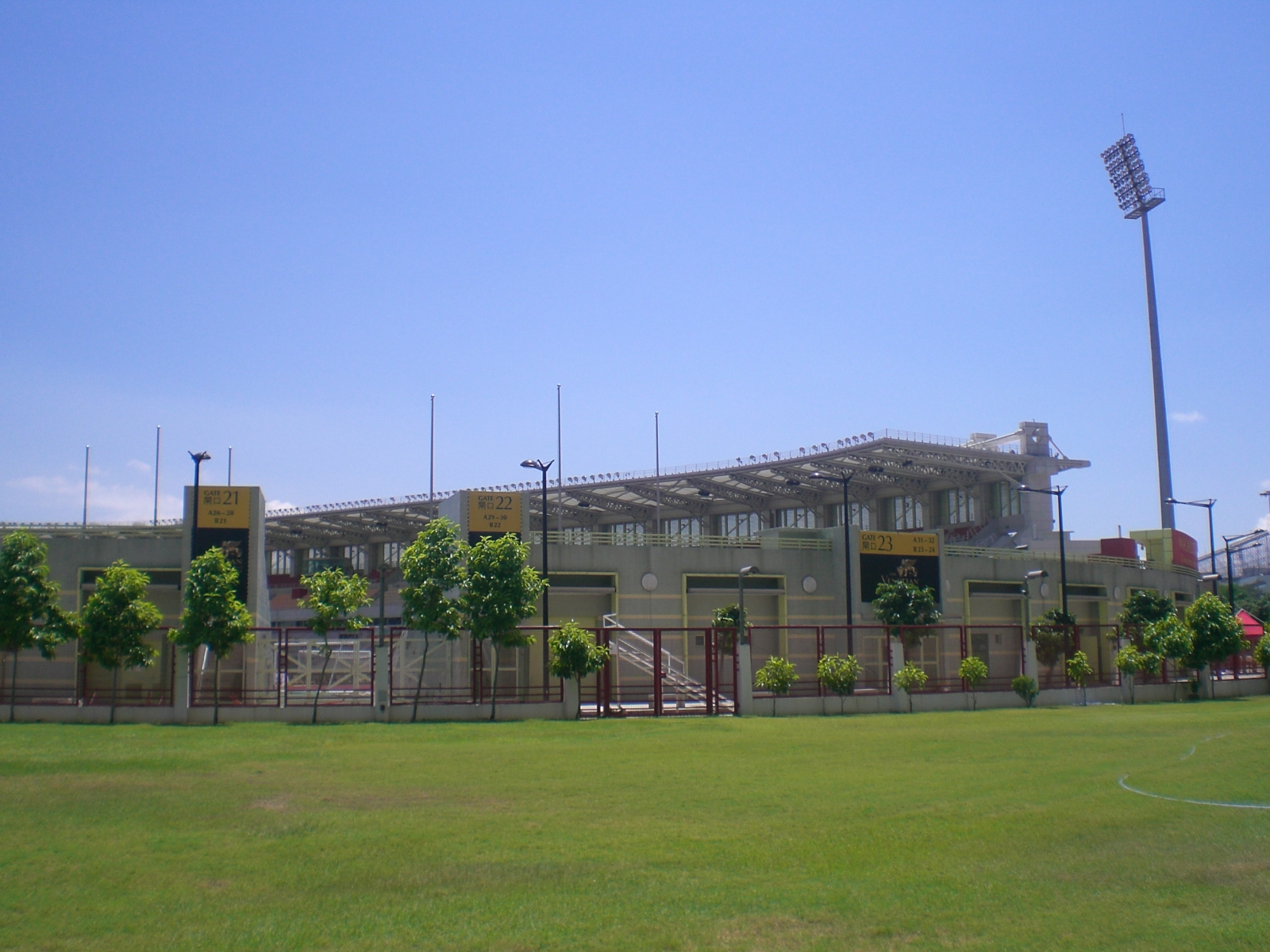

=== Final Tournament ===
Chongqing
Olympic Sports Center
Capacity: 58,680

== Preliminary Competition ==
=== Stage One ===
March 25, 2007
16:00

Northern Mariana Islands	2–3	Guam
Mark McDonald 57', 75'	Report	Alan Jamison 9'; Zachary Pangelinan 65', 78'

Oleai Sports Complex, Saipan

April 1, 2007
18:00

Guam	9–0	Northern Mariana Islands
Zachary Pangelinan 6', 21', 42', 54', 61'; Marvin Mendoza 56'; Elias Merfalen 57'; Alan Jamison 85'; Edward Calvo 91'	Report; Report

Guam National Football Stadium, Hagåtña
Attendance: 1324

Guam won over Northern Mariana Islands by an aggregate of 12–2 and advanced to stage two of the preliminary competition.

=== Stage Two ===
The top team of each group qualifies for the final match. The champion of the Preliminary Competition qualifies for the Final Competition.

==== Group A ====
Team	Pts	Pld	W	D	L	GF	GA	GD
North Korea	6	2	2	0	0	14	1	13
Macau	1	2	0	1	1	1	7	–6
Mongolia	1	2	0	1	1	0	7	–7

June 17, 2007
18:00

Macau	0–0	Mongolia
	Report	Munkhbat Chimeddorj (yellow card) 39'; Donorovyn Lkhümbengarav (yellow card) 65'

Macau Stadium, Macau
Attendance: 300
Referee: Hajime Matsuo (Japan)

June 19, 2007
18:00

North Korea	7–0	Mongolia
Ri Kum-chol 27', 43'; Jong Tae-se 29', 33', 34', 54'; Sin Yong-nam 35'; Jang Kyong-il (yellow card) 89'	Report	Sainkhuu Yura (yellow card) 28'

Macau Stadium, Macau
Attendance: 300
Referee: Kenji Ogiya (Japan)

June 21, 2007
18:00

North Korea	7–1	Macau
Ri Kum-chol 5', 18'; Jong Tae-se 10' (pen.), 12', 28', 60'; Pak Chung-il 68'	Report	Chan Kin Seng 46'

Macau Stadium, Macau
Attendance: 300
Referee: Wan Daxue (China)

==== Group B ====
Team	Pts	Pld	W	D	L	GF	GA	GD
Hong Kong	4	2	1	1	0	16	2	+14
Chinese Taipei	4	2	1	1	0	11	1	+10
Guam	0	2	0	0	2	1	25	–24

June 17, 2007
15:00

Guam	0–10	Chinese Taipei
Alan Jamison (yellow card) 22'; Frederic Benton II (yellow card) 85'	Report	Lo Chih En 7', 28', 72', 88'; Tsai Hui-Kai 20'; Feng Pao-hsing 25', 38'; Chen Po-Liang 52', 68'; Huang Cheng-Tsung 74'

Macau Stadium, Macau
Attendance: 300
Referee: Wan Daxue (China)

June 19, 2007
15:00

Hong Kong	1–1	Chinese Taipei
Chan Siu Ki (yellow card) 33'; Cristiano Preigchadt Cordeiro (yellow card) 44'; Lo Chi Kwan 56'; Cheung Kin Fung (yellow card) 62' (yellow-red card) 70'	Report	Kao Hao-Chieh (yellow card) 18'; Huang Wei Yi 51'

Macau Stadium, Macau
Attendance: 200
Referee: Kim Eui Soo (South Korea)

June 21, 2007
15:00

Hong Kong	15–1	Guam
Chan Siu Ki 4', 20', 36', 40', 50'; Lo Kwan Yee 8', 40'; Poon Yiu Cheuk 21'; Cheng Siu Wai 31'; Lo Chi Kwan 38'; Cristiano Preigchadt Cordeiro 56'; Dominic Gadia 67' (o.g.); Law Chun Bong 73'; Gerard Ambassa Guy 76'; Luk Koon Pong 86'	Report	Chris Mendiola 33'; Dominic Gadia (yellow card) 47'; Chris Mendiola (yellow card) 75'

Macau Stadium, Macau
Attendance: 300
Referee: Hajime Matsuo (Japan)

==== Playoff for Fifth Place ====
June 23, 2007
15:00

Guam	2–5	Mongolia
Zachary Pangelinan 2' (pen.); Chris Mendiola 8'; Dominic Gadia (yellow card) 28'; Baltazar Atalig III (yellow card) 71'; Carlo Rey Tambora (yellow card) 79'	Report	Carlo Rey Tambora 24' (o.g.); Bayarzorig Davaa 37', 42'; Bayasgalangiin Garidmagnai 46'; Anar Batchuluun 75'; Delgerdalai Gantumur (yellow card) 89'

Macau Stadium, Macau
Attendance: 100
Referee: Wan Daxue (China)

==== Playoff for Third Place ====
June 24, 2007
15:00

Chinese Taipei	7–2	Macau
Huang Wei Yi 3'; Feng Pao-hsing 42'; Kuo Chun Yi 52' (pen.); Cheng Yung-Jen (red card) 55'; Chen Po Liang 56'; Lo Chih En 57', 90+1'; Lo Chih An 79'	Report	Sou Fai Wong (yellow card) 32'; Lam Ka Pou (yellow card) 50'; Geofredo Cheung 48'; Leong Chong In 78'

Macau Stadium, Macau
Attendance: 200
Referee: Kim Eui Soo (South Korea)

==== Final of Stage Two ====
June 24, 2007
18:00

North Korea	1–0	Hong Kong
Kim Yong-su (yellow card) 17'; Mun In-guk (yellow card) 20'; Ri Pae-hun (yellow card) 34'; Mun In-guk 82'; Ji Yun-nam (yellow card) 89'	Report

Macau Stadium, Macau
Attendance: 300
Referee: Kenji Ogiya (Japan)

=== Awards ===
Best Goalkeeper	Best Defender	Top Scorer	Most Valuable Player	Fairplay Award
(Hong Kong) Fan Chun Yip	(North Korea) Nam Song-chol	(North Korea) Jong Tae-se	(North Korea) Mun In-guk	Macau

== Final Tournament ==
=== Matches Detail ===
Team	Pts	Pld	W	D	L	GF	GA	GD
South Korea	5	3	1	2	0	5	4	+1
Japan	5	3	1	2	0	3	2	+1
China	3	3	1	0	2	5	5	+0
North Korea	2	3	0	2	1	3	5	–2

All times, local time

February 17, 2008
15:30

China	2–3	South Korea
Zhou Haibin 46'; Liu Jian 61'	Report	Park Chu-young 42', 63'; Kwak Tae-hwi 90+1'

Olympic Sports Center, Chongqing
Attendance: 25,000
Referee: Mohsen Torky (Iran)
February 17, 2008
18:15

Japan	1–1	North Korea
Maeda 81'	Report	Jong Tae-se 5'

Olympic Sports Center, Chongqing
Attendance: 15,000
Referee: Choi Myung-yong (South Korea)

February 20, 2008
18:15

China	0–1	Japan
	Report	Yamase 17'

Olympic Sports Center, Chongqing
Attendance: 38,000
Referee: Tae Song (North Korea)
February 20, 2008
20:45

South Korea	1–1	North Korea
Yeom Ki-hun 20'	Report	Jong Tae-se 72'

Olympic Sports Center, Chongqing
Attendance: 20,000
Referee: Hiroyoshi Takayama (Japan)

February 23, 2008
18:15

Japan	1–1	South Korea
Yamase 67'	Report	Yeom Ki-hun 15'

Olympic Sports Center, Chongqing
Attendance: 29,000
Referee: Tan Hai (China PR)
February 23, 2008
20:45

China	3–1	North Korea
Zhu Ting 45'; Wang Dong 55'; Hao Junmin 88'	Report	Ji Yun-nam 35'

Olympic Sports Center, Chongqing
Attendance: 30,500
Referee: Mohsen Torky (Iran)

=== Personal Awards ===
Best Goalkeeper	Best Defender	Top Scorer	Most Valuable Player	Fairplay Award
(North Korea) Ri Myong-guk	(Japan) Yuji Nakazawa	(South Korea) Yeom Ki-hun (South Korea) Park Chu-young (Japan) Koji Yamase (North Korea) Jong Tae-se	(South Korea) Kim Nam-il	South Korea

== Final standing ==
Rank	Team
1	South Korea
2	Japan
3	China
4	North Korea
5	Hong Kong
6	Chinese Taipei
7	Macau
8	Mongolia
9	Guam
10	Northern Mariana Islands
