= 2007 in Taiwanese football =

- Enterprise Football League started on January 13 and ended on April 14, 2008. Taiwan Power Company F.C. won the championship and would be compete in AFC President's Cup 2008.
- The first season of Intercity Football League, founded by Chinese Taipei Football Association, was held from September 1 to December 9, 2008. Taipei City football team, represented by Tatung F.C., won the first league championship.

== Events ==
- November 30, 2007 - Asian Football Confederation decided to revoke Chinese Taipei's hosting right of 2008 AFC Challenge Cup because Taiwan failed to guarantee that it would meet the Asian governing body's standards for the 16-nation tournament.

== League competitions ==
=== Enterprise Football League ===
Pos	Club	Pld	W	D	L	GF	GA	GD	Pts
1	Taipower	6	3	2	1	9	11	-2	11
2	Kenting Chateau	6	2	4	0	12	8	+4	10
3	Fubon Financial	6	1	2	3	11	11	+0	5
4	Tatung	6	1	2	3	9	11	-2	5

== National teams ==
=== Men's national team ===
Date	Venue	Opponents	Score	Competition	Chinese Taipei scorer(s)	Report
June 17, 2007	Estádio Campo Desportivo, Macau	Guam	10–0	EAC	Lo Chih-en (4 goals), Tsai Hui-kai, Feng Pao-hsing (2 goals), Chen Po-liang (2 goals), Huang Cheng-tsung	EAFF
June 19, 2007	Estádio Campo Desportivo, Macau	Hong Kong	1–1	EAC	Huang Wei-yi	EAFF
June 24, 2007	Estádio Campo Desportivo, Macau	Macau	7–2	EAC	Huang Wei-yi, Feng Pao-hsing, Kuo Chun-yi, Chen Po-liang, Lo Chih-en (2 goals), Lo Chih-an	EAFF
October 13, 2007	Central Army Stadium, Tashkent (A)	Uzbekistan	0–9	WCQ		FIFA
October 28, 2007	Chungshan Soccer Stadium, Taipei (H)	Uzbekistan	0–2	WCQ		FIFA

Key

- (H) = Home match
- (A) = Away match
- EAC = East Asian Cup 2008 preliminary round
- WCQ = 2010 FIFA World Cup qualifying

=== Under-19 ===
Date	Venue	Opponents	Score	Competition	Chinese Taipei scorer(s)	Report
November 6, 2007	Bangkok	Japan	1–3	AYCQ		CTFA
November 10, 2007	Bangkok	Myanmar	0–0	AYCQ		CTFA
November 14, 2007	Bangkok	Thailand	0–3	AYCQ		CTFA
November 16, 2007	Bangkok	Maldives	1–1	AYCQ		CTFA
November 18, 2007	Bangkok	Laos	2–3	AYCQ		CTFA

Key

- AYCQ = AFC Youth Championship qualifying
