= 2007 Enterprise Football League =

Enterprise Football League 2007
- League: Enterprise Football League
- Sport: Football (soccer)
- Duration: 13 January 2007 – 14 April 2007

League
- League champions: Taiwan Power Company F.C.
- Runners-up: Tatung F.C.
- Top scorer: (Taiwan) Chiang Shih-lu (Taipower)

Enterprise Football League seasons
- ← 2006 2008 →

The 2007 season of the Enterprise Football League, also known as Fubon Enterprise Football League, consisted of four teams who play each other team twice. It was co-sponsored by Fubon Financial Holding Co. and Taiwan Cement Corporation. Taiwan Power Company F.C. won the league title and would represent Chinese Taipei to compete in AFC President's Cup 2008.

== League format ==
The league consisted of two rounds, with each team playing each other team once per round for a total of twelve games. The order in which teams played in the first round was chosen at random, while the order in the second round was determined by the position of the league on the league table.

The first round was played in January 2007 and the second round was played in March 2007. There was a break in February so that players in the Chinese Taipei national Olympic football team could prepare for the 2008 Summer Olympic qualifiers.

== League table ==
Pos	Team	Pld	W	D	L	GF	GA	GD	Pts	Qualification
1	Taipower	6	3	2	1	9	11	−2	11	Qualifies for 2008 AFC President's Cup
2	Kenting Chateau	6	2	4	0	12	8	+4	10	
3	Fubon Financial	6	1	2	3	11	11	0	5	
4	Tatung	6	1	2	3	9	11	−2	5	

== Results ==
1st \ 2nd round	FUB	CHA	POW	TAT
Fubon		1–1	2–3	1–4
Chateau	2–1		2–2	1–1
Taipower	0–5	1–1		2–1
Tatung	1–1	2–5	0–1	

=== First round ===
13 January 2007
13:00

Taipower	1 – 1	Kenting Chateau
(yellow card) 38' Pan Kuao-Kai; 42' Chiang Shih-lu	(Summary) (Report)	38' Fang Ching-jen

Kaohsiung County Stadium, Fongshan City
13 January 2007
15:00

Fubon Financial	1 – 1	Tatung
75' Chang Han	(Summary) (Report)	15' Hsu Che-hao; (yellow card) 60' Tsai Hui-kai

Kaohsiung County Stadium, Fongshan City

20 January 2007
13:00

Tatung	2 – 5	Kenting Chateau
77' Chang Wu-yeh; 87' Wu Chun-i	(Summary) (Report)	11' Chen Chi-feng; 46' Tseng Tai-lin; (yellow card) 49' Feng Pao-hsing; 51' Tseng Tai-lin; 63' Feng Pao-hsing; 71' Feng Pao-hsing

Kaohsiung County Stadium, Fongshan City
20 January 2007
15:00

Taipower	0 – 5	Fubon Financial
(yellow card) 35' Cheng Yung-jen; (yellow card) 48' (yellow-red card) 84' Kuo Chun-yi; (yellow card) 87' Huang Wen-cheng; (red card) 90' Chiang Shih-lu	(Summary) (Report)	21' Huang Cheng-tsung; 31' Huang Kai-chun; 69' Chang Han; 85' Chang Han; 90' Chen Po-liang

Kaohsiung County Stadium, Fongshan City

22 January 2007
13:00

Kenting Chateau	2 – 1	Fubon Financial
13' Lin Po-yuan; 22' Lee Meng-chian; (yellow card) 29' Lin Po-yuan; (yellow card) 35' Chen Bing-shin; (yellow card) 76' Huang Shih-chan	(Summary) (Report)	63' (pen) Huang Cheng-tsung; (yellow card) 70' Hsu Hsiang-yu

Kaohsiung County Stadium, Fongshan City
22 January 2007
15:00

Tatung	0 – 1	Taipower
(red card) 18' Chang Wu-yeh; (yellow card) 51' Chang Chih-chung; (yellow card) 82' Kao Hao-chieh	(Summary) (Report)	17' (pen) Tu Chu-hsien; (yellow card) 26' Tu Ming-feng; (yellow card) 42' Tu Chu-hsien; (yellow card) 57' Lee Tai-lin; (yellow card) 90' Yang Tzu-lung

Kaohsiung County Stadium, Fongshan City

=== Second round ===
1 April 2007
14:00

Tatung	4 – 1	Fubon Financial
7' Chuang Yao-tsung; 9' Lin Kuei-pin; 28' Huang Wei-yi; 86' Chang Chih-chung	(Summary)	57' Huang Kai-chun

Pailing Sport Park, Taipei City
1 April 2007
16:00

Taipower	2 – 2	Kenting Chateau
8' Pan Kuao-Kai; (yellow card) 32' Tu Ming-feng; (yellow card) 5' (red card) 40' Cheng Yung-jen; 87' Chiang Shih-lu	(Summary) (Report)	25' Wang Cheng-ming; 33' Tseng Tai-lin

Pailing Sport Park, Taipei City

8 April 2007
14:00

Kenting Chateau	1 – 1	Tatung
70' Fang Ching-jen; (yellow card) 71' Chen Chun-chieh; (yellow card) 78' Wang Chih-sheng; (yellow card) 53' (red card) 73' Feng Pao-hsing; (red card) 90' Chen Bing-shin	(Summary) (Report)	5' Chen Chung-tzu; (yellow card) 53' Huang Wei-yi; (yellow card) 69' Chuang Wei-lun

Pailing Sport Park, Taipei City
8 April 2007
16:00

Fubon Financial	2 – 3	Taipower
29' Chen Po-liang; 86' Chen Po-liang; (yellow card) 86' Hsu Hsiang-yu	(Summary) (Report)	23' Chen Jiunn-ming; 88' Chiang Shih-lu; (yellow card) 89' Huang Wen-cheng; 91' Chiang Shih-lu

Pailing Sport Park, Taipei City

14 April 2007
14:00

Taipower	2 – 1	Tatung
13' Chen Chi-feng; 62' Lin Po-yuan; (yellow card) 68' Lee Tai-lin; (yellow card) 80' Lin Po-yuan; (yellow card) 86' Pan Kuao-Kai	(Summary) (Report)	23' Chuang Wei-lun; (yellow card) 36' Wu Chun-i; (yellow card) 82' Chang Wu-yeh; (yellow card) 84' Chuang Wei-lun

Taipei American School, Taipei City
14 April 2007
16:00

Kenting Chateau	1 – 1	Fubon Financial
75' Wang Yong-lun; (yellow card) 45' (red card) 80' Fang Ching-jen	(Summary) (Report)	14' Huang Cheng-tsung; (yellow card) 74' Yang Chao-hsun; (yellow card) 89' Chen Yi-wei

Taipei American School, Taipei City

== Season goalscorers ==
4 goals

Scorer	Team
Chiang Shih-lu	Taipower

3 goals

Scorer	Team
Chang Han	Fubon Financial
Chen Po-liang	Fubon Financial
Huang Cheng-tsung	Fubon Financial
Tseng Tai-lin	Kenting Chateau

2 goals

Scorer	Team
Fang Ching-jen	Kenting Chateau
Feng Pao-hsing	Kenting Chateau
Huang Kai-chun	Fubon Financial
Lin Po-yuan	Taipower

1 goal

Scorer	Team
Chang Chih-chung	Tatung
Chang Wu-yeh	Tatung
Chen Chi-feng	Kenting Chateau
Chen Chung-tzu	Tatung
Chen Jiunn-ming	Taipower
Chuang Wei-lun	Tatung
Chuang Yao-tsung	Tatung
Hsu Che-hao	Tatung
Huang Wei-yi	Tatung
Lee Meng-chian	Taipower
Lin Kuei-pin	Tatung
Pan Kuao-Kai	Taipower
Tu Chu-hsien	Taipower
Wang Cheng-ming	Kenting Chateau
Wang Yong-lun	Kenting Chateau
Wu Chun-i	Tatung
