= 2004–05 Hong Kong Senior Shield =

Tournament details
- Country: Hong Kong
- Teams: 9

Final positions
- Champions: Sun Hei (1st title)
- Runners-up: Happy Valley

Tournament statistics
- Matches played: 8
- Goals scored: 30 (3.75 per match)

The Hong Kong Senior Shield 2004–05, also known as the Sunray Cave Senior Shield 2004/2005, was the 103rd staging of the Hong Kong's oldest football knockout competition.

The competition started on 9 April 2005 with 9 Hong Kong First Division League clubs and concluded on 13 April 2005 with the final.

Sun Hei captured their 1st title of the competition after beating Happy Valley by 4–2 in the final.

== Fixtures and results ==
All times are Hong Kong Time (UTC+8).

=== Bracket ===
Quarter-finals
Xiangxue Pharmaceutical	1
Kitchee	7
Happy Valley	4
*	Buler Rangers	1
Citizen	3 (1)
Sunray Cave (PSO)	3 (4)
Sun Hei	2
South China	1

Semi-finals
Kitchee	0 (1)
Happy Valley (PSO)	0 (3)
Sunray Cave	0
Sun Hei	1

Final
Happy Valley	2
Sun Hei	4

Note *: Buler Rangers beat Fukien 1–0 in the preliminary round.

=== Preliminary round ===
9 April 2005
16:00

Buler Rangers	1–0	Fukien
Jovanović ?'

Mong Kok Stadium
Attendance: 316

=== Quarterfinals ===
10 April 2005
14:00

Xiangxue Pharmaceutical	1–7	Kitchee
Wong Kin Wah 19'		Wilfed Bamnjo 40', 55', 70'; Keith Gumbs 47', 57', 84'; Pan Jidong 90'

Mong Kok Stadium
Attendance: 906

10 April 2005
16:00

Citizen	3–3 (AET)	Sunray Cave
Xu Yaozhong 20'; Leung Chun Pong ?'; Wang Zhenchang 56'		Liang Shiming 23'; Tang Dechao 25' (pen.); Liu Guogen 90'
Penalties
Wang Zhenchang (penalty scored); Ma Shuai (penalty missed); Lai Ka Fai (penalty missed)	1–4	(penalty scored) Li Yian; (penalty scored) Liu Guogen; (penalty scored) Chao Zhijie; (penalty scored) Du Zhiqiang

Mong Kok Stadium
Attendance: 906

14 April 2005
18:00

Happy Valley	4–1	Buler Rangers
Fabio 24'; Sham Kwok Keung 28'; Olivelira 52'; Marcio 80'	(in Chinese)	巴迪 73'

Mong Kok Stadium
Attendance: 936

14 April 2005
20:00

Sun Hei	2–1	South China
Lee Kin Wo 18'; Cornelius 38'	(in Chinese)	Au Wai Lun 58'

Mong Kok Stadium
Attendance: 936

=== Semi-finals ===
17 April 2005
14:00

Happy Valley	0–0 (AET)	Kitchee
Penalties
Marcio (penalty missed); Poon Yiu Cheuk (penalty missed) ? (penalty scored) ? (penalty scored); Lawrence (penalty scored)	3–1	(penalty missed) Keith Gumbs; (penalty missed) Chan Yiu Lun; (penalty missed) Tchakounte; (penalty scored) ?

Mong Kok Stadium
Attendance: 1,907

17 April 2005
16:00

Sun Hei	1–0	Sunray Cave
Akosah 50'

Mong Kok Stadium
Attendance: 1,907

=== Final ===
23 April 2005
15:30

Happy Valley	2–4	Sun Hei
Gerard 81'; Marcio 83'		Cornelius 21'; Andre 35'; Lo Chi Kwan 77'; Akosah ?'

Hong Kong Stadium
Attendance: 1,493

== See also ==
- www.rsssf.com Hong Kong 2004/05
