= Tu Chu-hsien =

Taiwanese footballer and coach

Personal information
- Full name: Tu Chu-hsien (涂居賢)
- Date of birth: 10 February 1979 (age 47)
- Place of birth: Kaohsiung, Taiwan
- Height: 1.78 m (5 ft 10 in)
- Positions: Defender; midfielder

Team information
- Current team: Taipower
- Number: 30

Senior career*
| Years | Team | Apps | (Gls) |
| ?–present | Taipower | | |

International career
| 2005–2007 | Chinese Taipei | 7 | (0) |
- * Club domestic league appearances and goals

Tu Chu-hsien (Chinese: 涂居賢; born 10 February 1979) is a Taiwanese football player. He currently plays for Taiwan Power Company F.C. as a defender or midfielder. He can play both right back and left back. Since 2008, Tu has served as assistant coach in Taipower.

== Personal life ==
Tu married Chang Hui-ching (Chinese: 張卉靜), also a footballer, in 2005.

== Playing history ==
- Wu-fu Primary School (五福國小)
- Feng-xi Junior High School (鳳西國中)
- Kao Yuan Senior High School of Technology and Commerce (高苑工商)
- Taipower

== Career statistics ==
| Club | Season | League | | Asia | | Total | |
| Club | Season | Apps | Goals | Apps | Goals | Apps | Goals |
|---|---|---|---|---|---|---|---|
| Taipower | 2005 | ? | ? | 3 | 0 | ? | ? |
| Taipower | 2006 | ? | ? | - | - | ? | ? |
| Taipower | 2007 | 6 | 1 | - | - | 6 | 1 |
| Taipower | 2008 | ? | ? | 0 | 0 | ? | ? |
| Career totals | | ? | ? | 3 | 0 | ? | ? |

== Honours ==
With Taiwan Power Company F.C.

- Enterprise Football League: 2007, 2008
