= Chiang Shih-lu =

Taiwanese footballer

Personal information
- Full name: Chiang Shih-lu (江世祿)
- Date of birth: 16 December 1982 (age 43)
- Place of birth: Taipei, Taiwan
- Height: 1.80 m (5 ft 11 in)
- Position: Striker

Team information
- Current team: Taipower
- Number: 21

Senior career*
Years	Team	Apps	(Gls)
2002–2012	Taipower	?	(32)

International career
2003(?)–2012	Chinese Taipei	10	(3)
- * Club domestic league appearances and goals

Chiang Shih-lu (Chinese: 江世祿; pinyin: Jiāng Shìlù; born 16 December 1982) is a Taiwanese football player who currently plays for Taipower as a striker. He has often been called Fast Legs of Taipower (台電快腿) for his fast speed on the field.

== Career statistics ==
Club	Season	League		Asia		Total	
Club	Season	Apps	Goals	Apps	Goals	Apps	Goals
Taipower	2005	?	8	3	1	?	9
Taipower	2006	?	5	-	-	?	5
Taipower	2007	5	4	-	-	5	4
Taipower	2008	?	12	2	2	?	14
Taipower	2009	?	?	1	0	1	0
Career totals		?	29	6	3	?	32

== International goals ==
No.	Date	Venue	Opponent	Score	Result	Competition
1.	26 February 2003	Hong Kong Stadium, Hong Kong	Mongolia	3–0	4–0	2003 East Asian Football Championship
2.	5 March 2005	Zhongshan Soccer Stadium, Taipei, Taiwan	Guam	4–0	9–0	2005 East Asian Football Championship
3.	5 March 2005	Zhongshan Soccer Stadium, Taipei, Taiwan	Guam	7–0	9–0	2005 East Asian Football Championship
4.	18 October 2006	Zhongshan Soccer Stadium, Taipei, Taiwan	São Tomé and Príncipe	2–2	2–2	Friendly
5.	4 April 2008	Zhongshan Soccer Stadium, Taipei, Taiwan	Guam	4–1	4–1	2008 AFC Challenge Cup qualification

== Honours ==
With Taiwan Power Company F.C.

- Enterprise Football League: 2007

Individual

- Enterprise Football League MVP: 2007
- Enterprise Football League Golden Boot: 2006, 2007
