= Guam National Football Stadium =

Sports venue in Guam

Coordinates: 13°30′02.4″N 144°46′44.68″E

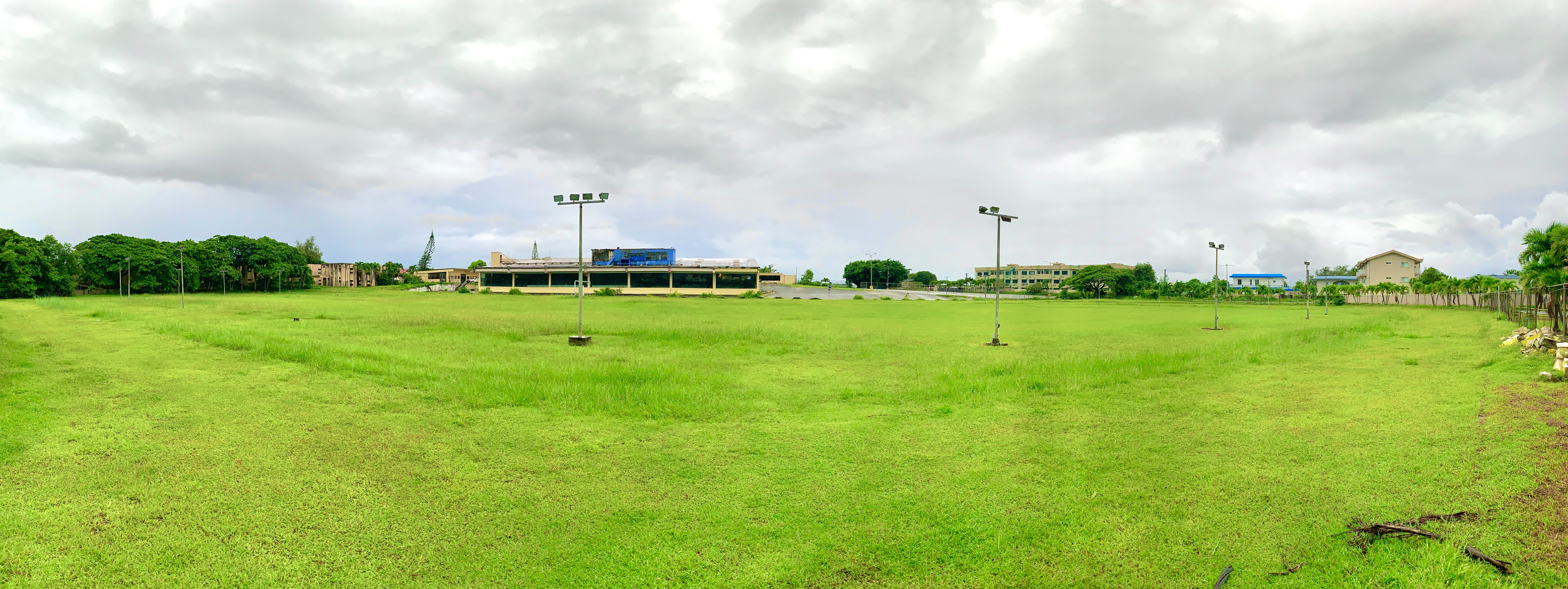
The stadium in October 2022

Guam National Football Stadium is a multi-use stadium in the village of Hagåtña in the United States territory of Guam. It is currently used mostly for football matches. The stadium holds 1,000.

As of 2024, the Guam Gators football team of the DTFL play their home games at the stadium.
