= Karun Gurung =

Bhutanese footballer and futsal player

Personal information
- Full name: Karun Gurung
- Date of birth: June 9, 1986 (age 40)
- Place of birth: Daga, Bhutan
- Height: 1.66 m (5 ft 5 in)
- Position: Midfielder

Senior career*
Years	Team	Apps	(Gls)
2009–2011	Druk Star		
2011–2017	Thimphu City		
2017–2020	Perth AFC		

International career
2009–2019	Bhutan	16	(0)
- * Club domestic league appearances and goals

Karun Gurung is a Bhutanese former football and futsal player, and current coach. He made his first appearance for the Bhutan national football team in 2009.
