= So Yiu Man =

Hong Kong footballer

So Yiu Man 蘇耀文
Personal information
- Full name: So Yiu Man
- Date of birth: 9 November 1977 (age 48)
- Place of birth: Hong Kong
- Height: 1.75 m (5 ft 9 in)
- Position: Right winger

Team information
- Current team: Eastern District

Senior career*
| Years | Team | Apps | (Gls) |
| 1998–2000 | Sai Kung | | |
| 2000–2001 | Po Chai Pills | | |
| 2001–2005 | South China | 29 | (4) |
| 2005–2007 | Citizen | 27 | (1) |
| 2007–2008 | Happy Valley | 0 | (0) |
| 2007–2008 | → Eastern (loan) | 4 | (1) |
| 2008–2009 | Mutual | 24 | (1) |
| 2009–2010 | Sun Hei | 8 | (0) |
| 2010–2011 | Eastern | | |
| 2011 | Fukien | | |
| 2011–2012 | Mettip | 1 | (0) |
| 2012–2016 | Eastern District | 58 | (18) |
| 2016–2018 | Tung Sing | 48 | (1) |
| 2018–2019 | Wan Chai | 18 | (2) |
| 2019–2021 | Sun Hei | | |
| 2021–2023 | 3 Sing | 18 | (0) |
| 2025– | Wing Yee | 20 | (5) |
- * Club domestic league appearances and goals as of 31 May 2026

So Yiu Man (Chinese: 蘇耀文; Jyutping: sou^{1} jiu^{6} man^{4}; born 9 November 1977) is a Hong Kong former professional football player who played as a midfielder. His nickname is "Siu-Cheun".

== Honours ==
With South China

- Hong Kong Senior Shield: 2001–02, 2002–03
- Hong Kong League Cup: 2001–02

With Eastern

- Hong Kong Senior Shield: 2007–08
