= Fan Chun Yip =

Hong Kong footballer and coach

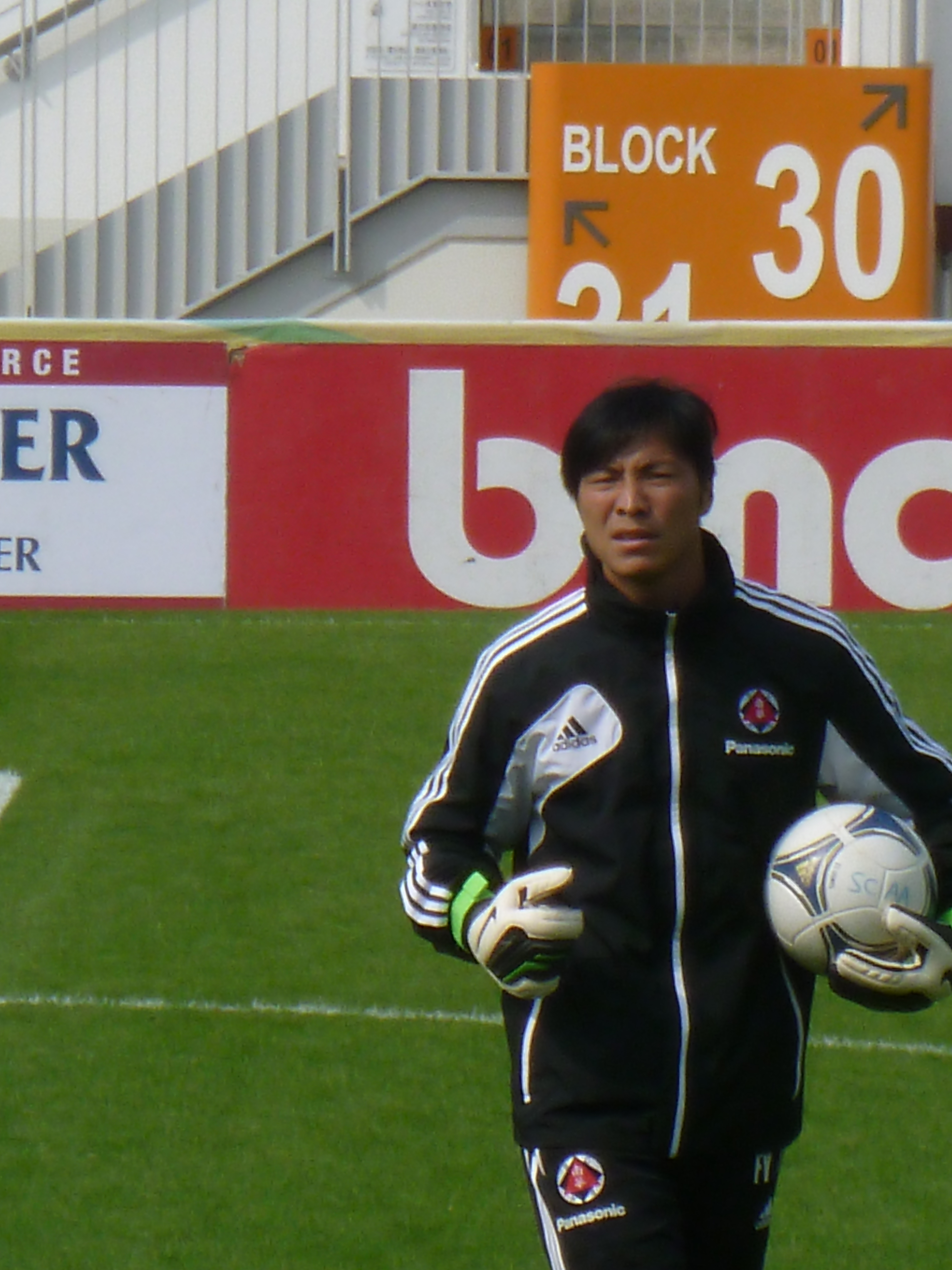

Personal information
- Full name: Fan Chun Yip
- Date of birth: 1 May 1976 (age 50)
- Place of birth: British Hong Kong
- Height: 1.83 m (6 ft 0 in)
- Position: Goalkeeper

Team information
- Current team: Southern (goalkeeping coach)

Senior career*
| Years | Team | Apps | (Gls) |
| 1995–1996 | Rangers (HKG) | | (0) |
| 1996–1997 | Happy Valley | | (0) |
| 1997–1998 | Yee Hope | | (0) |
| 1998–2001 | Instant-Dict | | (0) |
| 2001–2009 | Happy Valley | 88 | (0) |
| 2009–2010 | Shatin | 15 | (0) |
| 2010–2014 | South China | 0 | (0) |

International career
| 1998–2008 | Hong Kong | 40 | (0) |
| 2005–2006 | Hong Kong U-23 | 6 | (0) |

Managerial career
- 2010–2014: South China (goalkeeping coach)
- 2010–2015: Hong Kong (goalkeeping coach)
- 2015–2018: Pegasus (goalkeeping coach)
- 2018–2019: Eastern (goalkeeping coach)
- 2019–2020: South China (goalkeeping coach)
- 2020–2021: Pegasus (goalkeeping coach)
- 2021–: Southern (goalkeeping coach)
- * Club domestic league appearances and goals

Fan Chun Yip
- Traditional Chinese: 范俊業
- Hanyu Pinyin: Fan Jinye
- Cantonese Yale: Faahn Jeun Yihp
Transcriptions
Standard Mandarin
- Hanyu Pinyin: Fan Jinye
Yue: Cantonese
- Yale Romanization: Faahn Jeun Yihp
- Jyutping: Faan6 Zeon3 Jip6

Fan Chun Yip (Chinese: 范俊業; born 1 May 1976) is a former Hong Kong professional footballer who played as a goalkeeper. He is currently the goalkeeping coach of Hong Kong Premier League club Southern.

Widely considered as one of the best goalkeepers in Hong Kong back in the days, he was voted as the Hong Kong Footballer of the Year in the 2003–04 season.

== Childhood and early career ==
Fan was born in Hong Kong into a 7-member family. He is the youngest son. As a child, his 2nd oldest brother, who was tragically murdered in 2006, invited him to a 7 a-side match. Because he was the smallest, he was picked to be the goalkeeper. He surprised everyone with his agility and goalkeeping prowess, and even dived to save shots from the opponent on the hard concrete "pitch". After this, Fan would regularly play in goal, which built his interest in football.

In 1985, Fan joined the Hong Kong football promotional program, and was picked for the Hong Kong Schools Sports Federation training team.

After being picked for the Hong Kong Schools Sports Federation training team, Fan was picked to join the Hong Kong Sports Institute because his potential was recognised. From amateur, Fan was promoted to the junior team, then promoted to the youth team. Because of his average height, it was not easy for him to proceed and become the first choice keeper of the youth team.

After Fan's promotion to the youth team, he started off his 4-year long accommodated training. Because Fan was professionally trained by the Hong Kong Sports Institute, he eventually was selected to represent the Hong Kong youth team.

Rangers is the First Division club Fan first joined. In a Reserve League match, he injured his index finger and was forced to rest for a couple of months. After recovering from this injury, he was named in the Hong Kong Olympic squad.

After a year at Rangers, he was loaned to Happy Valley. Happy Valley gave him the chance to make his debut, against his parent club, Rangers. Fan gained a lot of first-team experience with Happy Valley, although a hand injury kept him sidelined for two months. After this, he was released by Hong Kong Rangers.

In the two years after Fan's departure from Rangers, he joined Yee Hope and Instant-Dict. In the third year after Fan's joining to the club, he helped the club to win the Hong Kong FA Cup.Unfortunately, it was the last title for the club, as the sponsor left the club, forcing them to disband. On the night of 8 August 2003, Fan became nationally famous. There was an exhibition match against Spanish giants Real Madrid in the Hong Kong National Stadium. In the first half, the home team was down 4–2 due to the poor performance by the China goalkeeper An Qi. Fan came on as a substitute in the second half. He made a string of excellent saves to keep Real Madrid (with World Class players such as Beckham, Zidane, Raul and Ronaldo) at bay in the second half. After this 45-minutes, everyone in Hong Kong started to recognise and notice him.

== Club career ==
On 17 November 2004, China played against Hong Kong in Guangzhou in a World Cup 2006 qualifying match. Fan performed numerous saves, and saved Zheng Zhi's crucial penalty kick. The save ended China's hope of reaching the 2006 tournament on goal difference, with Kuwait finishing above them in the group by virtue of one goal. After the match, the Mainland Chinese press named Fan 'The Bane of China', and Fan received some personal attack and threats; though fans of Hong Kong supported and honoured him as the Hero of Hong Kong, Pride of Hong Kong, etc. This has somewhat ironically led to his popularity in China, and Fan has attracted some Chinese clubs' interest.

In 2005, Chinese Super League team Changsha Ginde were interested in Fan and wanted to sign him from Happy Valley, and he verbally accepted the offer. The transfer was called off however, due to the sudden murder of his brother. Fan had no choice but had to stay in Hong Kong to take care of his family. In the meantime, he has promised that he will not join any team in the future except Changsha Ginde, and indicated that he will join them after the painful transition.

On 1 July 2007, a Reunification Cup was held in Hong Kong to celebrate the re-merging of Hong Kong with China anniversary. A China-Hong Kong XI (Chinese national team including six Hong Kong international players) played a World Star XI. Fan was given the captain's armband by the Chinese national team's head coach. He took part in the first half of the International exhibition match and again impressed highly. His excellence was acknowledged by the fans, who gave him an ovation and chanted his nickname Jyujai (豬仔; "Piggy").

Fan played for Shatin Sports Association in the Hong Kong First Division League. Before joining Shatin Sports Association, he played for Instant-Dict, Yee Hope, Rangers and Happy Valley. This was Fan's second spell with Happy Valley, having joined on loan some years previously. He made his international debut on 19 November 1998 against the Vietnam.

Fan made it into the Hong Kong league's Team of the Season four times consecutively between 2001 and 2005, and has been awarded the 'Hong Kong First Division League Most Popular Player' twice consecutively (2004–06).

== International career ==
In 2005, Fan again impressed in his second appearance in the East Asian Cup, his excellent performances impressing foreign press and football fans alike. Indeed, he was eventually awarded the Best Goalkeeper of the tournament. Fan is now recognized as one of the best goalkeepers in Asia (along with the Japan national Yoshikatsu Kawaguchi and the R.O. Korean national Lee Woon-Jae).

On 6 September 2006, Hong Kong were playing against Uzbekistan in the Asian Cup Qualification Group stages. Fan was the star player for the Hong Kong, he consistently made excellent saves, infuriating the Uzbekistan's forwards, to the extent that one of them spat at him, though the matter was resolved. At last, Fan was noted the man of the match.

== Managerial career ==
On 10 May 2020, it was reported that Fan would return to Pegasus as a goalkeeping coach after working at the club between 2015 and 2018.

== Honours ==
=== Individual ===
- Hong Kong Footballer of the Year: 2003–04

== Career statistics ==
=== International ===
As of 19 November 2008

| # | Date | Venue | Opponent | Result | Captain | Competition |
|---|---|---|---|---|---|---|
| 1 | 2 December 1998 | Suphachalasai Stadium, Bangkok, Thailand | Thailand | 0–5 | | 1998 Asian Games |
| 2 | 28 February 2003 | Hong Kong Stadium, Hong Kong | Mongolia | 10–0 | | 2003 EAFF Championship Preliminary |
| 3 | 2 March 2003 | Hong Kong Stadium, Hong Kong | Guam | 11–0 | | 2003 EAFF Championship Preliminary |
| 4 | 4 August 2003 | Jalan Besar Stadium, Singapore | Singapore | 1–4 | | Friendly |
| 5 | 6 November 2003 | Pakhtakor Stadium, Tashkent, Uzbekistan | Uzbekistan | 1–4 | | 2004 AFC Asian Cup qualification |
| 6 | 8 November 2003 | Pakhtakor Stadium, Tashkent, Uzbekistan | Tajikistan | 0–0 | | 2004 AFC Asian Cup qualification |
| 7 | 10 November 2003 | Pakhtakor Stadium, Tashkent, Uzbekistan | Thailand | 2–1 | | 2004 AFC Asian Cup qualification |
| 8 | 4 December 2003 | National Stadium, Tokyo, Japan | South Korea | 1–3 | | 2003 EAFF Championship |
| 9 | 7 December 2003 | Saitama Stadium, Saitama, Japan | Japan | 0–1 | | 2003 EAFF Championship |
| 10 | 12 December 2003 | International Stadium Yokohama, Yokohama, Japan | China | 1–3 | | 2003 EAFF Championship |
| 11 | 18 February 2004 | Darulmakmur Stadium, Penang, Malaysia | Malaysia | 3–1 | | 2006 FIFA World Cup qualification |
| 12 | 31 March 2004 | Siu Sai Wan Sports Ground, Hong Kong | China | 0–1 | | 2006 FIFA World Cup qualification |
| 13 | 9 June 2004 | Kazma SC Stadium, Kuwait City, Kuwait | Kuwait | 0–4 | | 2006 FIFA World Cup qualification |
| 14 | 8 September 2004 | Hong Kong Stadium, Hong Kong | Kuwait | 0–2 | | 2006 FIFA World Cup qualification |
| 15 | 13 October 2004 | Mong Kok Stadium, Hong Kong | Malaysia | 2–0 | | 2006 FIFA World Cup qualification |
| 16 | 17 November 2004 | Tianhe Stadium, Guangzhou, China | China | 0–7 | | 2006 FIFA World Cup qualification |
| 17 | 30 November 2004 | Jalan Besar Stadium, Singapore | Singapore | 0–0 (6–5 PSO) | | Friendly |
| 18 | 9 February 2005 | Hong Kong Stadium, Hong Kong | Brazil | 1–7 | | 2005 Carlsberg Cup |
| 19 | 11 March 2005 | Chungshan Soccer Stadium, Taipei, Chinese Taipei | Chinese Taipei | 5–0 | | 2005 EAFF Championship Preliminary |
| 20 | 13 March 2005 | Chungshan Soccer Stadium, Taipei, Chinese Taipei | North Korea | 0–2 | | 2005 EAFF Championship Preliminary |
| 21 | 29 January 2006 | Hong Kong Stadium, Hong Kong | Denmark | 0–3 | | 2006 Carlsberg Cup |
| 22 | 1 February 2006 | Hong Kong Stadium, Hong Kong | Croatia | 0–4 | | 2006 Carlsberg Cup |
| 23 | 15 February 2006 | Hong Kong Stadium, Hong Kong | Singapore | 1–1 | | Friendly |
| 24 | 18 February 2006 | Hong Kong Stadium, Hong Kong | India | 2–2 | | Friendly |
| 25 | 22 February 2006 | Hong Kong Stadium, Hong Kong | Qatar | 0–3 | | 2007 AFC Asian Cup qualification |
| 26 | 1 March 2006 | Bangabandhu National Stadium, Dhaka, Bangladesh | Bangladesh | 1–0 | | 2007 AFC Asian Cup qualification |
| 27 | 12 August 2006 | Hong Kong Stadium, Hong Kong | Singapore | 1–2 | | Friendly |
| 28 | 16 August 2006 | Pakhtakor Markaziy Stadium, Tashkent, Uzbekistan | Uzbekistan | 2–2 | | 2007 AFC Asian Cup qualification |
| 29 | 6 September 2006 | Hong Kong Stadium, Hong Kong | Uzbekistan | 0–0 | | 2007 AFC Asian Cup qualification |
| 30 | 11 October 2006 | Al-Gharafa Stadium, Doha, Qatar | Qatar | 0–2 | (c) | 2007 AFC Asian Cup qualification |
| 31 | 15 November 2006 | Mong Kok Stadium, Hong Kong | Bangladesh | 2–0 | | 2007 AFC Asian Cup qualification |
| 32 | 1 June 2007 | Gelora Bung Karno Stadium, Jakarta, Indonesia | Indonesia | 0–3 | | Friendly |
| 33 | 10 June 2007 | So Kon Po Recreation Ground, Hong Kong | Macau | 2–1 | | 2007 Hong Kong–Macau Interport |
| 34 | 19 June 2007 | Estádio Campo Desportivo, Macau | Chinese Taipei | 1–1 | | 2008 EAFF Championship Preliminary |
| 35 | 21 June 2007 | Estádio Campo Desportivo, Macau | Guam | 15–1 | | 2008 EAFF Championship Preliminary |
| 36 | 24 June 2007 | Estádio Campo Desportivo, Macau | North Korea | 0–1 | | 2008 EAFF Championship Preliminary |
| 37 | 28 October 2007 | Hong Kong Stadium, Hong Kong | Timor-Leste | 8–1 | | 2010 FIFA World Cup qualification |
| 38 | 10 November 2007 | Hong Kong Stadium, Hong Kong | Turkmenistan | 0–0 | (c) | 2010 FIFA World Cup qualification |
| 39 | 18 November 2007 | Olympic Stadium, Ashgabat, Turkmenistan | Turkmenistan | 0–3 | (c) | 2010 FIFA World Cup qualification |
| 40 | 19 November 2008 | Macau UST Stadium, Macau | Macau | 9–1 | | Friendly |

== Personal life ==
Fan married when he was 23 and has a son named Kenji Fan who is a model and actor. He and his family now live in Kowloon Bay. He enjoys war game simulations with his teammates and friends during his leisure time. His most admired football players are Netherlands goalkeeper Edwin van der Sar and Italy's number one Gianluigi Buffon.

Fàn is a member of the Fàn family.

== Fame beyond football ==
Fan is sponsored by Nike, with all his sportswear provided by the company. His goalkeeping gloves and boots are sewed with his initials on (C Y FAN).

Fan is also the spokesman for two companies, one for skincare and the other for ointment.

In 2005, Fan was invited to be the host for a Hong Kong TV program about sport.

Fan is now also an amateur football live commentator with IPTV's now TV.

Fan was invited to be a visitor in an Olympic related TV programme on TVB in 2008.

Awards
| Preceded by First winner | Hong Kong First Division League Most Popular Player; 2003–04 (First title); 2004–05 (Second title) | Succeeded by Au Wai Lun |
| Preceded by Domingos Chan | East Asian Football Championship Preliminary Round; Best Goalkeeper Award; 2005 (First title); 2008 (Second title) | Succeeded by Brett Maluwelmeng |
