= Lee Kin Wo =

Hong Kong footballer and manager

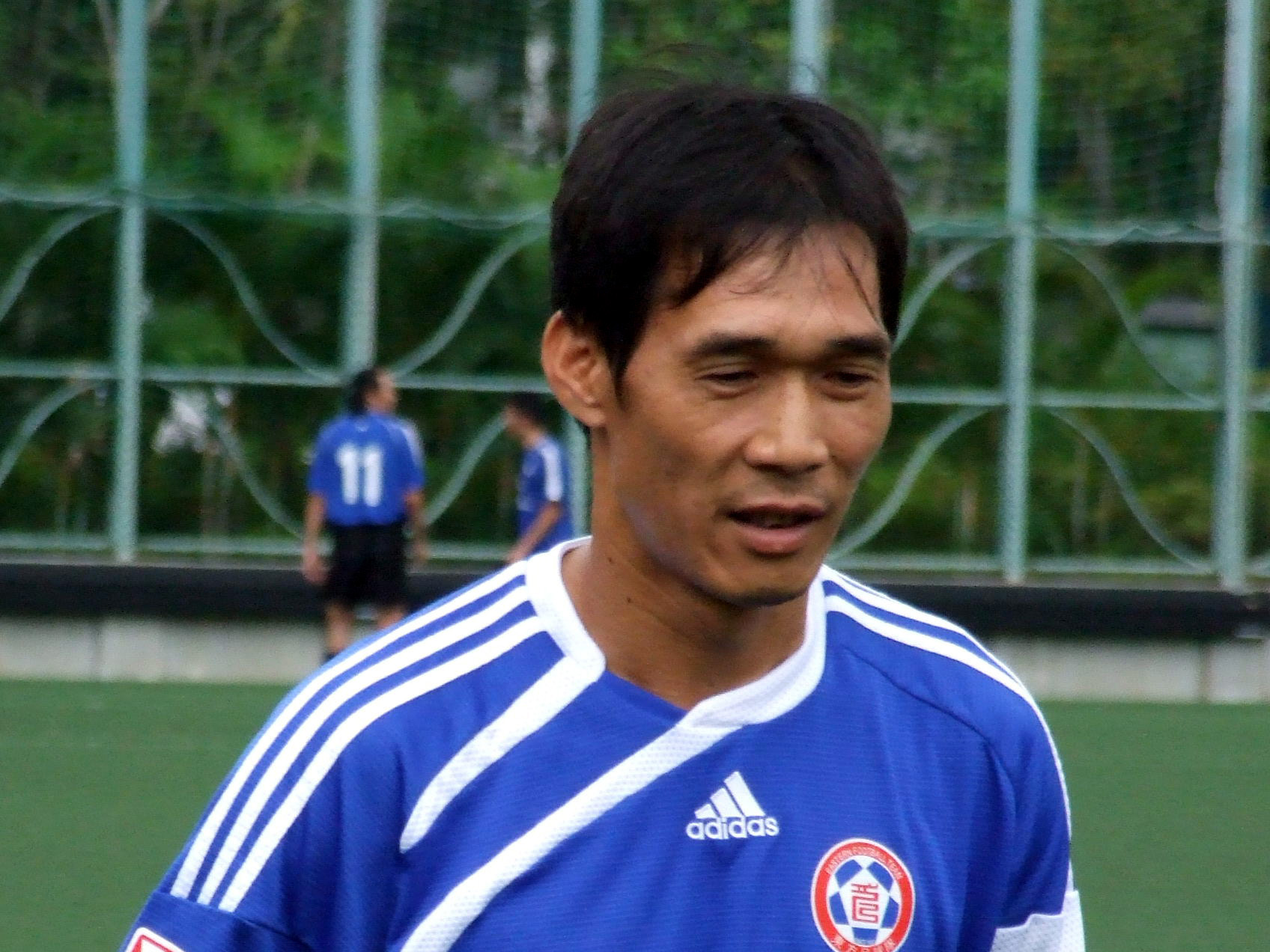
- Lee in 2009

Personal information
- Date of birth: 20 October 1967 (age 59)
- Place of birth: Hong Kong
- Height: 1.78 m (5 ft 10 in)
- Position: Winger

Senior career*
Years	Team	Apps	(Gls)
1985–1988	Eastern		(8)
1988–1989	Double Flower		(5)
1989–1991	Lai Sun		(5)
1991	Geylang United	5	(1)
1991–1995	Eastern		(14)
1995–2003	South China		(30)
2003–2007	Sun Hei	52	(9)
2007–2008	Workable	17	(0)
2008–2013	Eastern	65	(13)

International career
1987–2003	Hong Kong	48	(11)

Managerial career
- Hong Kong 09
- 2007: Hong Kong
- 2007–2008: Workable (player-manager)
- 2008–2013: Eastern (player-manager)
- 2017–2018: Eastern (assistant coach)
- 2018: Eastern
- * Club domestic league appearances and goals

Lee Kin Wo (Chinese: 李健和; Jyutping: lei^{5} gin^{6} wo^{4}; born 20 October 1967) is a former Hong Kong professional footballer who played as a winger.

Lee won the Hong Kong Footballer of the Year award three times during his career. He holds an AFC "A" License.

== Club career ==
Lee made his debut in Hong Kong First Division on 13 October 1985 when he was only 17 years old. He is most memorable for participating in the friendly match for South China (Lee was loaned from Eastern for that match, along with Dale Tempest) versus São Paulo, the Brazilian team with national representatives Cafu, Leonardo Araújo and Zetti at that time. Finally, South China won the match by 4–2 and Lee scored the fourth goal of his team.

Lee retired from professional football after the end of the 2008–09 season, at the age of 41.

== International career ==
In May 2000, during an international friendly hosted by Macau, Lee kicked the football toward the upper body of the Macau referee Choi Kuok-kun, after several unfair decisions were being awarded in favour of the home side. Hong Kong eventually won the match by 1–0 and Choi was banned from officiating for life.

== Coaching career ==
On 22 May 2007, Lee was appointed as the head coach of the Hong Kong national football team. The first match he led was a friendly match played away against Indonesia, which Hong Kong eventually lost 0–3.

Lee was appointed as head coach of Eastern for the second time on 19 January 2018 following the resignation of Szeto Man Chun.

== Personal life ==
Lee resides with his family on Peng Chau. His eldest son Lee Ka Wah is also a former professional footballer.

== Honours ==
Double Flower

- Hong Kong FA Cup: 1988–89
- Viceroy Cup: 1988–89

Eastern

- Hong Kong First Division: 1992–93, 1993–94, 1994–95
- Hong Kong Senior Shield: 1986–87, 1992–93, 1993–94, 2007–08
- Hong Kong FA Cup: 1992–93, 1993–94

Geylang United

- FAS Premier League: 1991

South China

- Hong Kong First Division: 1995–96, 1997–98, 1998–99
- Hong Kong FA Cup: 1997–98, 2000–01
- Hong Kong League Cup: 2001–02
- Hong Kong Viceroy Cup: 1997–98

Sun Hei

- Hong Kong First Division: 2003–04, 2004–05
- Hong Kong Senior Shield: 2004–05
- Hong Kong FA Cup: 2004–05, 2005–06
- Hong Kong League Cup: 2003–04, 2004–05

Individual

- Hong Kong Footballer of the Year: 1993, 1994, 2003

Awards
Preceded by Chan Kwok Fai; Chan Chi Kwong	Hong Kong First Division League; Best Young Player Award (with Lee Fuk Wing); 1986–87	Succeeded by Leslie Santos; Chiu Chung Man
