= Batchuluuny Anar =

Mongolian footballer (born 1985)

Personal information
- Full name: Batchuluuny Anar; Батчулууны Анар
- Date of birth: December 29, 1985 (age 40)
- Place of birth: Mongolia
- Position: Midfielder

Team information
- Current team: Erchim

Senior career*
Years	Team	Apps	(Gls)
- Erchim

International career
2007–	Mongolia	8	(1)
- * Club domestic league appearances and goals

Batchuluuny Anar (Mongolian: Батчулууны Анар; born 29 December 1985) is a Mongolian professional footballer. He made his first appearance for the Mongolia national football team in 2007.
