= Lai Kai Cheuk =

Hong Kong footballer (born 1977)

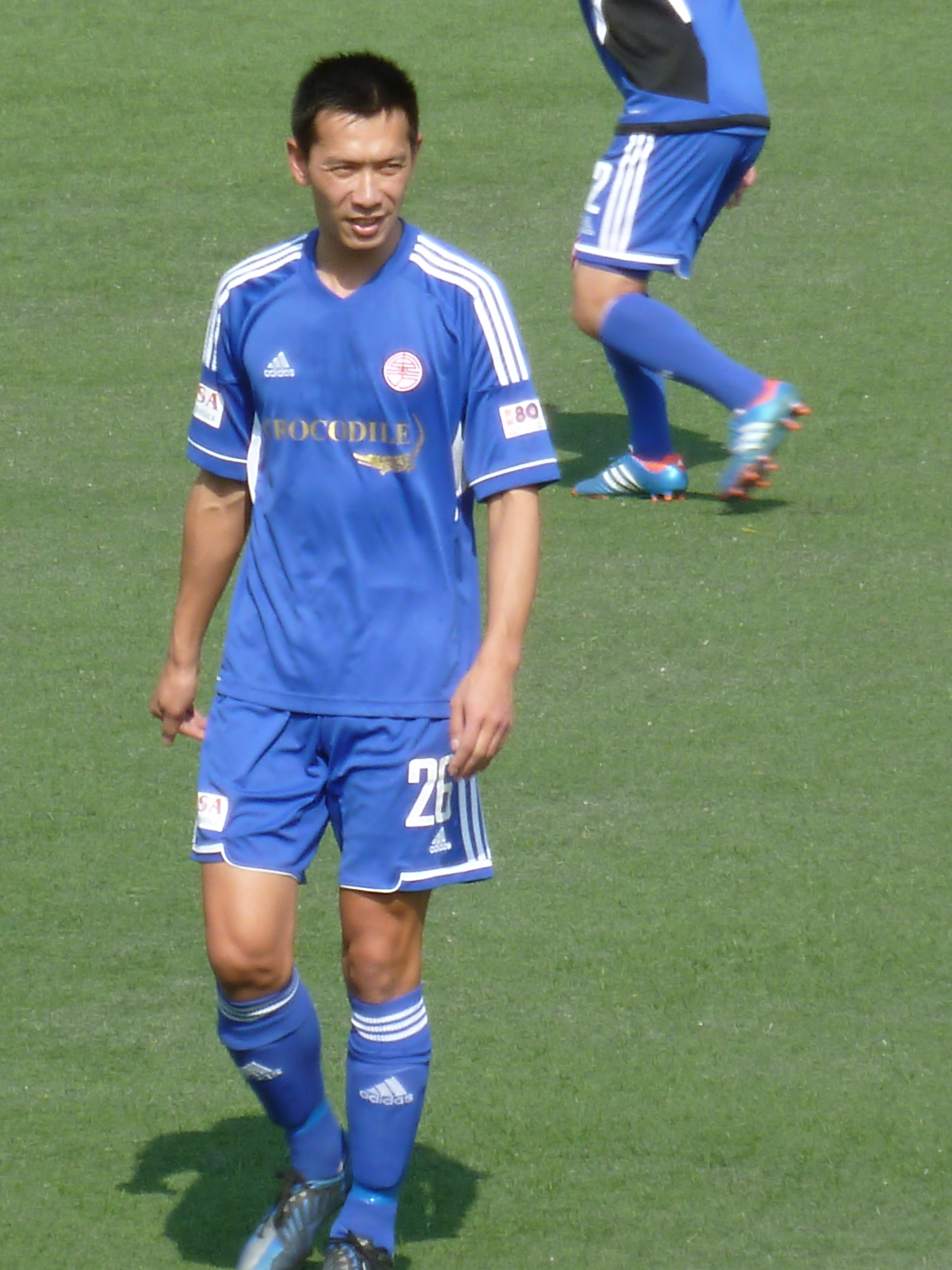

Personal information
- Full name: Lai Kai Cheuk
- Date of birth: 5 July 1977 (age 49)
- Place of birth: Hong Kong
- Height: 1.87 m (6 ft 2 in)
- Positions: Centre back; defensive midfielder

Senior career*
Years	Team	Apps	(Gls)
1994–1997	Rangers (HKG)		
1997–2004	Happy Valley		
2004–2006	Sun Hei	25	(3)
2007	Shek Kip Mei	12	(9)
2007–2009	Sun Hei	36	(0)
2009–2011	Shatin	33	(1)
2011–2012	Double Flower	17	(3)
2012–2013	Eastern	15	(0)
2017–2021	North District	42	(6)
2021–2022	Heng Wah		
2023	St. Joseph's	9	(0)

International career^{‡}
- Hong Kong U-23
1998–2006	Hong Kong	24	(1)
- * Club domestic league appearances and goals as of 1 January 2024 ‡ National team caps and goals as of 19 August 2006

Lai Kai Cheuk (Chinese: 賴啟卓; Jyutping: laai^{6} kai^{2} coek^{3}, born 5 July 1977) is a Hong Kong former professional footballer who played as a centre back or a defensive midfielder.

== Career statistics ==
=== International ===
Appearances and goals by national team and year
National team	Year	Apps	Goals
Hong Kong	1998	1	0
Hong Kong	1999	2	1
Hong Kong	2000	4	0
Hong Kong	2001	1	0
Hong Kong	2002	–	
Hong Kong	2003	5	0
Hong Kong	2004	1	0
Hong Kong	2005	–	
Hong Kong	2006	4	0
Total		18	1

Scores and results list Hong Kong's goal tally first, score column indicates score after each Lai Kai goal.

List of international goals scored by Lai Kai Cheuk
No.	Date	Venue	Opponent	Score	Result	Competition
1	7 November 1999	Olympic Stadium, Phnom Penh, Cambodia	Cambodia	1–0	1–0	2000 AFC Asian Cup qualification
