= Domingos Chan =

Macanese footballer

Domingos Chan 陳達燊
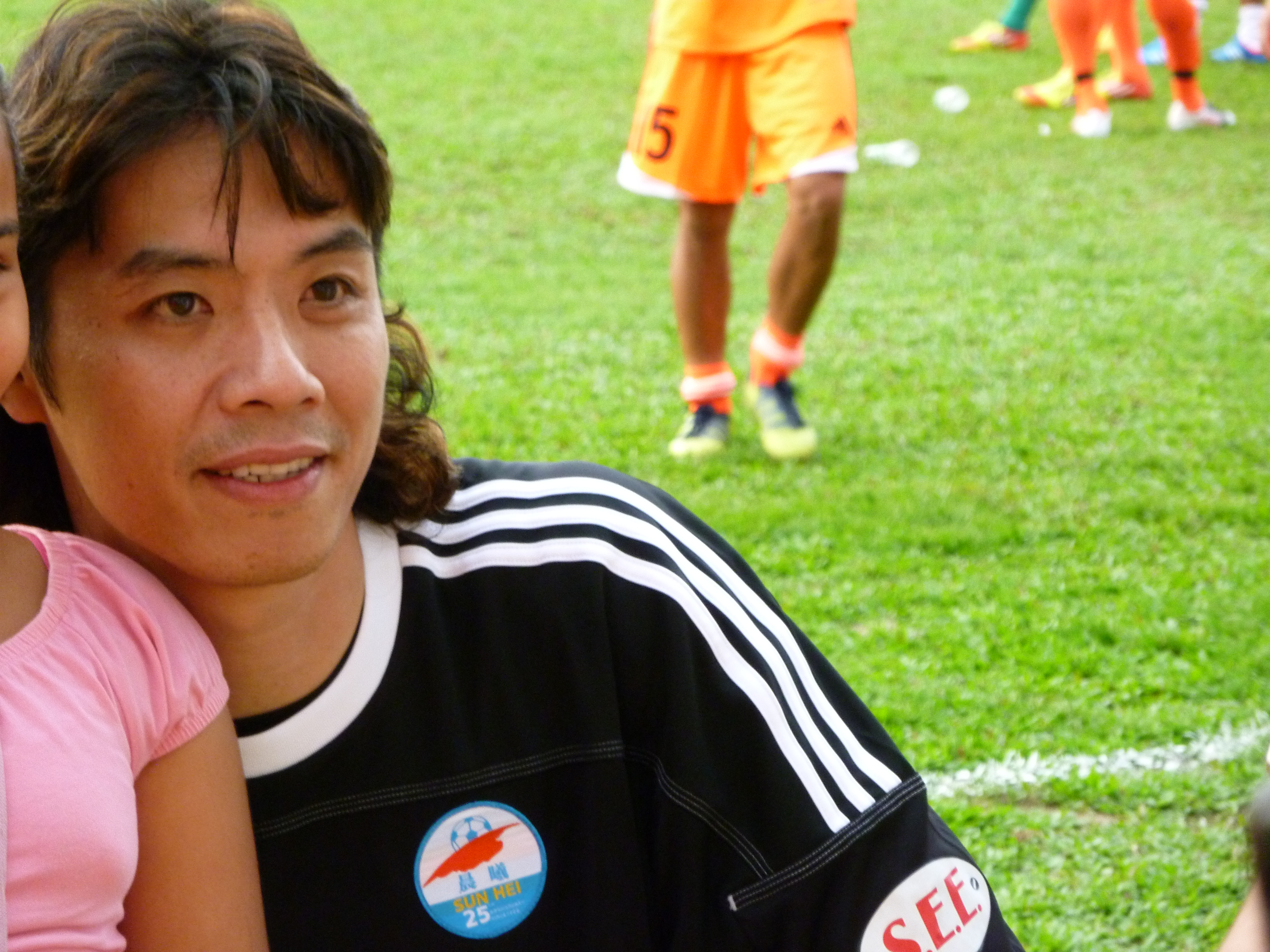

Personal information
- Full name: Domingos Chan Tat Sun
- Date of birth: 11 September 1970 (age 56)
- Place of birth: Macau
- Height: 1.91 m (6 ft 3 in)
- Position: Goalkeeper

Senior career*
Years	Team	Apps	(Gls)
1998–2000	Lam Pak		
2000–2007	Sun Hei	77	(0)
2007–2008	Monte Carlo		
2009	Lam Pak		
2009–2012	Sun Hei	12	(0)
2012–2015	Monte Carlo	30	(0)
2016–2017	Chao Pak Kei	21	(0)
2021	Sun City		

International career
1997–2006	Macau	14	(0)
- * Club domestic league appearances and goals as of 2 July 2017

Domingos Chan (Chinese: 陳達燊, born 11 September 1970) is a former Macanese professional footballer who played as a goalkeeper. He retired in 2017.

Awards
Preceded by First Winner	East Asian Football Championship Preliminary; Best Goalkeeper; 2003	Succeeded by Fan Chun Yip
