= Armel Tchakounte =

Cameroonian footballer

Personal information
- Full name: Armel Tchakounté Njonga
- Date of birth: December 22, 1978 (age 47)
- Place of birth: Cameroon
- Height: 1.90 m (6 ft 3 in)
- Positions: Forward; midfielder

Youth career
- Stade Bandjoun

Senior career*
Years	Team	Apps	(Gls)
1995–1997	Stade Bandjoun	48	(7)
1997–1999	Fovu de Baham	46	(4)
1999–2001	Stade Bandjoun	52	(9)
2001–2002	Tonnerre Yaoundé	23	(2)
2002–2003	Victoria United Limbé	26	(1)
2003–2004	Grenoble	13	(0)
2004–2005	Hong Kong Rangers	33	(2)
2004–2005	Kitchee	23	(2)
2005–2006	Carshalton Athletic	15	(2)
2006–2007	Queens Park Rangers	0	(0)
2007–2009	Renaissance FC de Ngoumou	56	(7)
2009–2010	Fovu de Baham	22	(4)
Total		301	(40)
- * Club domestic league appearances and goals

Armel Tchakounté Njonga (born December 22, 1978) is a retired Cameroonian professional footballer who most notably played for Queens Park Rangers following a transfer from non-league club Carshalton Athletic.

== Career ==
=== Early career ===
Tchakounté played competitive football in Cameroon before moving to France playing for Grenoble followed by Hong Kong where he joined Buler Rangers. He later played for Kitchee. He then moved to the UK and played for the non-league side Carshalton Athletic F.C. in the 2005/2006 season. He then got his big break, signing for Championship side Queens Park Rangers in July 2006.

=== Buler Rangers ===
Armel Tchakounté initially signed a two-year contract with Hong Kong Premier League side Buler Rangers. During his time at the club, the centre midfield player was described as a "Rock" due to his strength and power on the ground and in the air. He scored two goals for his side and played an important role in helping the side compete at the top of the league. This led to him attracting the attention of other teams such as South China, Kitchee and many more. After six months of playing for Buler Rangers, he earned the opportunity to sign for league leaders Kitchee, where he played as a centre midfielder.

=== Carshalton Athletic ===
On moving to the UK, Tchakounte was signed by English non-league side Carshalton Athletic at the beginning of January 2006. At the time, Athletics were struggling at the bottom of the Conference South league table. Tchakounte made his debut with the FA Trophy second round clash with Accrington Stanley and scored a goal. He then made his full league debut in the away fixture at the fellow relegation strugglers Hayes on 26 March 2006. His full playing record at Carshalton was 19 games and 2 substitute appearances. He was an unused substitute on 2 occasions, scoring 5 goals.

=== Queens Park Rangers ===
On 5 May 2006, Carshalton announced on their official website that Armel Tchakounté had signed for the Football League Championship club; the Queens Park Rangers on a one-year deal after spending the final three weeks of the 2005–06 season with them. Upon his arrival, the Cameroonian midfielder was announced as a player to help them being promoted. However, he only managed four first team games and was an unused substitute on five occasions. The record also showed that he played six times for the reserve team before an injury in January 2007 brought his season to an abrupt halt.

== International career ==
Armel earned his first cap with Cameroon under 18 a few weeks before his 16th birthday in a 3–1 win against Chad in Yaounde. He was the youngest player on the field but managed to imposed his authority in the midfield which led him to his first senior cap. The record also showed that he was called into the senior squad five times.

== Style of play ==
Tchakounté played as a midfielder known for his pressing ability and stamina, which allowed him to contribute both defensively and in attack.

== Post-retirement ==
After his football career ended prematurely, Tchakounté decided to channel his efforts into football coaching and his academic studies. He obtained a Bachelor of Science Physics in 2010 and also a UEFA B Licence. He also obtained an MBA in International Business Management and a Masters in Banking and Finance at the University of Surrey. Armel was a pundit for Voxafrica's coverage of the 2015 African Cup of Nations. He currently lives in London.
