= Brett Maluwelmeng =

Guamanian footballer and manager

Personal information
- Full name: Brett Simon Maluwelmeng
- Date of birth: 19 February 1985 (age 41)
- Place of birth: Sioux City, Iowa, United States
- Height: 1.91 m (6 ft 3 in)
- Position: Goalkeeper

Senior career*
Years	Team	Apps	(Gls)
- Quality Distributors

International career
2006–2011	Guam	14	(0)

Managerial career
- 2013–: Guam (women's)
- * Club domestic league appearances and goals

Brett Maluwelmeng (born February 19, 1985, in Sioux City, Iowa, United States) is a Guam professional footballer and football manager. He plays as a goalkeeper for Quality Distributors. He was still an active player in the Guam national football team from 2006 to 2011 and played at least 14 matches.

Brett Maluwelmeng is also a coach of the Guam women's national football team.
