= Sahan Mumtazali =

Bruneian footballer

Personal information
- Full name: Mohammad Sahan bin Mumtazali
- Date of birth: 5 March 1986 (age 40)
- Place of birth: Kuala Belait, Brunei
- Position: Goalkeeper

Senior career*
Years	Team	Apps	(Gls)
2002–2003	AH United		
2004–2005	Wijaya		
2006–2012	QAF		
2013	Majra		
2014	QAF		
2015–2017	Kasuka		

International career^{‡}
2005	Brunei U21		
2006–2009	Brunei	3	(0)
- * Club domestic league appearances and goals as of 29 August 2024 ‡ National team caps and goals as of 29 August 2024

Mohammad Sahan bin Mumtazali (born 5 March 1986) is a Bruneian former footballer who played as a goalkeeper.

He made his first appearance for the Brunei national football team in 2009.
