= Randy Espinosa =

Guamanian footballer

Personal information
- Full name: Randy Navarrete Espinosa
- Date of birth: August 22, 1988 (age 38)
- Height: 1.73 m (5 ft 8 in)
- Position: Striker

Youth career
- 2005–2006: Guam Under 18s

College career
Years	Team	Apps	(Gls)
2007–2008	Seattle Redhawks		

Senior career*
Years	Team	Apps	(Gls)
2009–	Guam United Soccer Club		

International career
2006–	Guam	4	(0)
- * Club domestic league appearances and goals

Randy Navarrete Espinosa (born 22 August 1988) is a Guamanian international footballer.

== Career ==
Espinosa played for the Guam U-18 team, before joined to Seattle Redhawks. In 2009 signed for Guam United Soccer Club.

=== International ===
He made his first appearance for the Guam national football team in 2006.
