= Feng Pao-hsing =

Taiwanese footballer

Personal information
- Full name: Feng Pao-hsing (馮保興)
- Date of birth: 18 August 1982 (age 44)
- Place of birth: Republic of China
- Height: 1.72 m (5 ft 8 in)
- Position: Midfielder

Team information
- Current team: Taipower
- Number: 11

Senior career*
Years	Team	Apps	(Gls)
2005	Fubon Financial		
2006	NSTC		
2007–present	Taipower	5	(2)

International career
2006–2013	Chinese Taipei	15	(3)
2008–	Chinese Taipei futsal		
- * Club domestic league appearances and goals

Feng Pao-hsing (Chinese: 馮保興; pinyin: Féng Bǎoxìng, born 18 August 1982) is a Taiwanese football (soccer) player. He currently plays for Taiwan Power Company F.C. His usual position is defensive midfielder.

He played for the Chinese Taipei national football team in the 2010 FIFA World Cup qualifying rounds.

== Career statistics ==
=== Club ===
Club	Season	League		Asia		Total	
Club	Season	Apps	Goals	Apps	Goals	Apps	Goals
Taipower	2007	5	2	-	-	5	2
Taipower	2008	?	?	2	0	2	0
Taipower	2009	?	?	1	1	1	1
Career totals		5	2	3	1	8	3

=== International ===
Appearances and goals by national team and year
National team	Year	Apps	Goals
Chinese Taipei	2006	8	0
Chinese Taipei	2007	5	3
Chinese Taipei	2008	–	
Chinese Taipei	2009	–	
Chinese Taipei	2010	–	
Chinese Taipei	2011	–	
Chinese Taipei	2012	1	0
Chinese Taipei	2013	1	0
Total		15	3

Scores and results list Chinese Taipei's goal tally first, score column indicates score after each Feng goal.

List of international goals scored by Feng Pao-hsing
No.	Date	Venue	Opponent	Score	Result	Competition
1	17 June 2007	Centro Desportivo Olímpico – Estádio, Taipa, Macau	Guam	3–0	5–0	2008 East Asian Football Championship qualification
2	17 June 2007	Centro Desportivo Olímpico – Estádio, Taipa, Macau	Guam	10–0	5–0	2008 East Asian Football Championship qualification
3	24 June 2007	Centro Desportivo Olímpico – Estádio, Taipa, Macau	Macau	2–0	7–2	2008 East Asian Football Championship qualification
