= Cheng Yung-jen =

Taiwanese footballer

Personal information
- Full name: Cheng Yung-jen (鄭勇仁)
- Date of birth: 24 January 1977 (age 49)
- Place of birth: Republic of China
- Positions: Defender; defensive midfielder

Senior career*
Years	Team	Apps	(Gls)
?–2008	Taipower		

International career
- Chinese Taipei
- * Club domestic league appearances and goals

Cheng Yung-jen (Chinese: 鄭勇仁; pinyin: Zhèng Yǒngrén; born 24 January 1977) is a Taiwanese football player who as of 2008 played as a defender for Taiwan Power Company F.C. Most of the time he was the sweeper for the team. He was appointed defensive midfielder for the Chinese Taipei national football team after new manager Toshiaki Imai joined in January 2006.

== Career statistics ==
Club	Season	League		Asia		Total	
Club	Season	Apps	Goals	Apps	Goals	Apps	Goals
Taipower	2006	?	?	-	-	?	?
Taipower	2007	?	?	-	-	?	?
Taipower	2008	?	?	1	0	?	?
Career totals		?	?	1	0	?	?

== Honours ==
With Taiwan Power Company F.C.

- Enterprise Football League: 2007
