= 2004–05 Hong Kong League Cup =

Football competition in Hong Kong

Hong Kong League Cup 2004–05 is the 5th staging of the Hong Kong League Cup.

The competition sponsor was Sunray Cave Limited.

Sun Hei captured the champion for 3 consecutive times after beating Happy Valley by 1-0 in the final.

== Group stage ==
All times are Hong Kong Time (UTC+8).

=== Group A ===
Team	Pts	Pld	W	D	L	GF	GA	GD
Happy Valley	7	3	2	1	0	10	4	6
Sun Hei	6	3	2	0	1	8	5	3
Kitchee	4	3	1	1	1	7	7	0
Fukien	0	3	0	0	3	0	9	-9

9 December 2004

Happy Valley	2-2	Kitchee

9 December 2004

Sun Hei	1-0	Fukien

12 December 2004

Happy Valley	4-0	Fukien

12 December 2004

Sun Hei	5-1	Kitchee

18 December 2004

Happy Valley	4-2	Sun Hei

18 December 2004

Kitchee	4-0	Fukien

=== Group B ===
Team	Pts	Pld	W	D	L	GF	GA	GD
Buler Rangers	8	4	2	2	0	10	5	5
Citizen	8	4	2	2	0	5	2	3
South China	6	4	2	0	2	5	6	-1
Sunray Cave	5	4	1	2	1	5	3	2
Xiangxue Pharmaceutical	0	4	0	0	4	3	12	-9

7 December 2004

Buler Rangers	5-2	Xiangxue Pharmaceutical

7 December 2004

Citizen	2-0	South China

11 December 2004

Citizen	1-0	Xiangxue Pharmaceutical

11 December 2004

South China	1-0	Sunray Cave

14 December 2004

Buler Rangers	1-1	Citizen

14 December 2004

Sunray Cave	3-0	Xiangxue Pharmaceutical

16 December 2004

Buler Rangers	1-1	Sunray Cave

16 December 2004

South China	3-1	Xiangxue Pharmaceutical

19 December 2004

Buler Rangers	3-1	South China

19 December 2004

Citizen	1-1	Sunray Cave

== Knockout stage ==
=== Bracket ===
Semifinals
A1	Happy Valley	5
B2	Citizen	0
A2	Sun Hei	1 (4)
B1	Buler Rangers	1 (3)

Finals
A1	Happy Valley	0
A2	Sun Hei	1

Hong Kong League Cup 2004–05 Winner

Sun Hei
Third Title

=== Semi-finals ===
22 December 2004

Happy Valley	5-0	Citizen
Clodoaldo de Oliveira ?', ?'; Fabio Lopes Alcantara ?', ?'; Leung Shing Kit ?' (PEN.)

Attendance: –
22 December 2004

Buler Rangers	0-0 0-0 (AET) 3-4 (PSO)	Sun Hei

Attendance: –

=== Final ===
27 December 2004

Sun Hei	1-0	Happy Valley
Chan Ho Man 87'	(in chinese)

Hong Kong Stadium
Attendance: 2,468

== Individual awards ==
- Best Defensive Player: (Brazil) Cristiano Cordeiro of Sun Hei
- Top Scorer: (Brazil) Ernestina of Happy Valley

== Trivia ==
- Happy Valley and Sun Hei's crash in the final was the third consecutive time in this competition. Sun Hei won in all the three times.
