= Chan Man Hei =

Macanese footballer

Personal information
- Date of birth: 2 November 1981 (age 45)
- Place of birth: Macau, China
- Height: 1.73 m (5 ft 8 in)
- Position: Midfielder

Senior career*
Years	Team	Apps	(Gls)
2002–2007	Corpo de Bombeiros		
2007–2008	Cycle		
2008–2010	Artilheiros		
2011	Windsor Arch Ka I		
2012–2013	Lam Pak	6	(0)
2014	Artilheiros		

International career
2001–2011	Macau	21	(1)
- * Club domestic league appearances and goals as of 24 May 2018

Chan Man Hei (陳文煕, born 2 November 1981) is a Macanese footballer who plays as a midfielder for GD Lam Pak.
