= 2008 Enterprise Football League =

Enterprise Football League 2008
- League: Enterprise Football League
- Sport: Association football
- Duration: January 5, 2008 - April 27, 2008

League
- League champions: Taiwan Power Company F.C.
- Runners-up: Tatung F.C.
- Top scorer: Chang Han (Molten Tso I)

Enterprise Football League seasons
- ← 2007

The 2008 season of the Enterprise Football League (also known as the Fubon Enterprise Football League) was held from January 5 to April 27, 2008. With 4 college teams also participating, the number of competing teams increased from 4 to 8. The 2007 league champion Taiwan Power Company F.C. successfully defended the title.

At the end of 2008, the Chinese Taipei Football Association decided to merge the Enterprise Football League into the Intercity Football League. As a result, this was the last Enterprise Football League season.

== Teams ==
The 2008 league season consisted of 8 teams, 4 of which were existing teams from the 2007 season: Taipower (台電), Tatung (大同), Chinese Taipei U-23 (as Fubon Financial, 富邦), and the National Sports Training Center football team (國訓). Four additional college teams, Bros (悍創), E-United (義聯集團), Hun Sing (鴻鑫北體), and Molton Tso I (Molten佐儀), also participated in this season.

Semi-professional clubs

- Taiwan Power Company F.C. (abbr. Taipower)
- Tatung F.C.

Only Taipower and Tatung were eligible to represent Chinese Taipei in the AFC President's Cup.

National or military teams

- Fubon Financial: Chinese Taipei National Under-23 football team
- National Sports Training Center football team (NSTC)

College teams

- Bros: Ming Chuan University football team
- E-United: mainly I-Shou University football team
- Hun Sing: Taipei Physical Education College football team
- Molten Tso I: National Taiwan College of Physical Education football team

== Venues ==
- Chungshan Soccer Stadium, Taipei (rounds 1-3, 8-10, 13-14)
- Kaohsiung County Stadium, Fongshan City (rounds 1-5, 8-12)
- I-Shou University, Kaohsiung (rounds 4-7, 11-12)
- Chung Cheng Industrial Vocational High School, Kaohsiung (rounds 6-7)
- Bailing Sports Park, Taipei (round 13-14)

== League table ==
Pos	Team	Pld	W	D	L	GF	GA	GD	Pts	Qualification
1	Taipower	14	11	2	1	34	6	+28	35	2009 AFC President's Cup
2	Tatung	14	11	2	1	29	6	+23	35	
3	Molten Tso I	14	10	0	4	31	8	+23	30	
4	E-United	14	6	1	7	21	31	−10	19	
5	Hun Sing	14	4	4	6	13	20	−7	16	
6	NSTC	15	3	2	10	7	21	−14	11	
7	Bros	14	3	0	11	11	34	−23	9	
8	Fubon Financial	14	2	1	11	10	31	−21	7	

== Results ==
1st \ 2nd stage	BRO	EUN	FUB	HS	MOL	NSTC	POW	TAT
Bros		1–5	0–2	0–1	0–2	1–0	0–4	0–2
E-United	?		3–1	2–1	0–5	1–2	1–3	0–2
Fubon Financial	?	0–1		0–0	0–3	0–1	0–1	1–2
Hun Sing	3–1	1–3	1–2		1–0	1–1	1–1	0–1
Molten Tso I	3–2	3–0	5–1	6–0		2–0	1–0	0–1
NSTC	0–1	1–1	2–1	0–2	0–2		0–3	0–1
Taipower	3–1	6–1	4–0	2–0	1–0	2–0		3–0
Tatung	4–0	4–0	5–0	1–1	2–0	3–0 (Note: The game result was actually 1-1. However, because NSTC was found to have banned player playing in the game, according to the league regulations, Tatung won 3-0.)	1–1	

Source: rsssf.com
Notes:

Bottom section = first stage (rounds 1-7); Top section = second stage (rounds 8-14).

== Season statistics ==
- First goal of the season: Huang Jui-hao for National Sports Training Center football team against Fubon Financial (Chinese Taipei U-23) (January 5, 2008)
- Widest winning margin: 6 goals – Molten Tso I 6-0 Hun Sing
- Most goals in a match: 7 goals – Taipower 6-1 E-United

== Top scorers ==
Scorer	Goals	Team
Chang Han	14	Molten Tso I
Chiang Shih-lu	12	Taipower
Chuang Wei-lun	10	Tatung

== Awards ==
- MVP: Huang Chiu-ching (Taipower)
- Best Manager: Chen Kuei-jen (Taipower)
- Golden Boot: Chang Han (Molten Tso I)
- Fair Play: Fubon Financial

== See also ==
- 2008 in Taiwanese football
