= 2025 Kyrgyz Premier League =

Kyrgyz Premier League
- Season: 2025
- Dates: 4 March 2025–9 November 2025
- Champions: Bars Issyk-Kul (1st title)
- Relegated: Asiagoal Bishkek
- AFC Challenge League: Bars Issyk-Kul
- Matches: 78
- Goals: 202 (2.59 per match)
- Biggest home win: Talant 3–0 Bars Issyk-Kul (5 March 2025); Muras United 3–0 Abdysh-Ata (11 March 2025); Neftchi Kochkor-Ata 4–1 OshSU-Aldier (12 March 2025); Uzgen 3–0 Kyrgyzaltyn (28 March 2025); Dordoi Bishkek 3–0 Bishkek City (19 April 2025); Bars 3–0 Ilbirs (25 April 2025); OshSU Aldier 3–0 Bishkek City (2 May 2025); Abdysh-Ata 3–0 Talant (2 May 2025); Abdysh-Ata 3–0 Bishkek City (18 May 2025)
- Biggest away win: Asiagoal Bishkek 0–5 Neftchi Kochkor-Ata (19 April 2025)
- Highest scoring: Uzgen 2–5 Abdysh-Ata (23 May 2025)
- Longest winning run: Alay Osh (5); Dordoi Bishkek (5); Muras United (5)
- Longest unbeaten run: Muras United (9); Dordoi Bishkek (6)
- Longest winless run: Asiagoal Bishkek (10)
- Longest losing run: Asiagoal Bishkek (6)
- All statistics correct as of 11 June 2025.

The 2025 Kyrgyz Premier League is the 34th season of the Kyrgyzstan League, Kyrgyzstan's top division of association football organised by the Football Federation of Kyrgyz Republic. From this year the league has been expanded from 10 to 14 teams.

== Teams ==
=== Team changes ===
The following teams have changed division since the 2024 season.

- Asiagoal Bishkek
- FC Bars Issyk-Kul
- FC Bishkek City
- FC Uzgen

Last season, Kyrgyzaltyn originally relegated but stay from top division.

Locations of teams in the 2025 Kyrgyz Premier League

Note: Table lists in alphabetical order.

Team	Location	Venue	Capacity
Abdysh-Ata	Kant	Stadion Sportkompleks Abdysh-Ata	3,000
Alay Osh	Osh	Suyumbayev Stadion	11,200
Alga Bishkek	Bishkek	Dolen Omurzakov Stadium	23,000
Asiagoal Bishkek	Bishkek		
Bars Issyk-Kul	Karakol	Karakol Central Stadium	8,000
Bishkek City	Bishkek	Dolen Omurzakov Stadium	23,000
Dordoi Bishkek	Bishkek	Dolen Omurzakov Stadium	23,000
Ilbirs Bishkek	Bishkek	Stadium FC FFKR	1,000
Kyrgyzaltyn	Kara-Balta	Stadion Manas Kara-Balta	
Muras United	Jalal-Abad	Kurmanbek Stadium	4,500
Neftchi	Kochkor-Ata	Stadion Neftyannik Kochkor-Ata	5,000
OshSU Aldier	Osh	Suyumbayev Stadion	4,000
Uzgen			
Talant	Kant	Sport City Stadion	1,500

== Personnel and kits ==
Note: Flags indicate national team as has been defined under FIFA eligibility rules. Players and Managers may hold more than one non-FIFA nationality.

Team	Manager/head coach	Captain	Kit manufacturer	Shirt sponsor
Abdysh-Ata	(Kyrgyzstan) Khurshit Lutfullayev		Joma	Nitro FRESH
Alay Osh	(Kyrgyzstan) Bakytbek Mamatov		Joma	-
Alga Bishkek	(Ukraine) Serhiy Popov			
Asiagoal Bishkek	(Uzbekistan) Islam Akhmedov		Joma	mbulak
Bars	Vacant			
Bishkek City	(Italy) Giovanni Costantino		Joma	Simbank by DosCredoBank
Dordoi Bishkek	(Kyrgyzstan) Vladimir Salo		Kelme	-
Ilbirs Bishkek	(Kyrgyzstan) Nurbek Zholdoshov		Joma	Sakbol
Kyrgyzaltyn	(Kyrgyzstan) Aleksandr Beldinov			
Muras United	(Ukraine) Oleksandr Poklonskyi		Joma	-
Neftchi	(Uzbekistan) Aleksandr Mochinov		Kelme	-
OshSU Aldier	(Uzbekistan) Lutfillo Majitov		Joma	-
Uzgen	(Kyrgyzstan) Nadyrbek Mamadaliev		Joma	-
Talant	(Kyrgyzstan) Urmat Abdukaimov		Kelme	AЗMИ

=== Managerial changes ===
Team	Outgoing manager	Manner of departure	Date of vacancy	Position in table	Replaced by	Date of appointment	Position in table	Ref.
Muras United	Andrei Kanchelskis	Signed by Dynamo Bryansk		Preseason	Oleksandr Poklonskyi	10 January 2025	Preseason	
Abdysh-Ata	Islam Akhmedov	End of contract	10 December 2024	Preseason	Vladimir Vujović	30 January 2025	Preseason	
Abdysh-Ata	Vladimir Vujović		19 February 2025	Preseason	Ivan Kurtušić	28 February 2025	Preseason	
OshSU Aldier	Aleksandr Beldinov		16 April 2025	13th	Muslimbek Khurmamatov (Interim)	16 April 2025	13th	
Abdysh-Ata	Ivan Kurtušić		24 April 2025	4th	Mirlan Eshenov (Interim)	24 April 2025	4th	
OshSU Aldier	Muslimbek Khurmamatov (Interim)		8 May 2025	8th	Lutfillo Majitov	9 May 2025	8th	
Bishkek City	Mavi Lopes		10 May 2025	13th	Ruslan Dzhanybekov (Interim)	29 May 2025	13th	
Bishkek City	Ruslan Dzhanybekov (Interim)		28 May 2025	13th	Giovanni Costantino	29 May 2025	13th	
Kyrgyzaltyn	Vladimir Tunkin		2 June 2025	9th	Aleksandr Beldinov	4 June 2025	9th	
Abdysh-Ata	Mirlan Eshenov (Interim)	End of Role	10 June 2025	3rd	Khurshit Lutfullayev	10 June 2025	3rd	
Bars	Aleksandr Krestinin		19 June 2025	3rd				

== Foreign players ==
A team can use only five foreign players on the field in each game.

Club	Player 1	Player 2	Player 3	Player 4	Player 5	Player 6	Player 7	Player 8	Player 9	Player 10	Player 11	AFC Players	Former Players
Abdysh-Ata	(Brazil) Barreto	(Brazil) Riquelme Sousa	(Bosnia and Herzegovina) Haris Ibrisagic	(Bosnia and Herzegovina) Ermin Imamovic	(Bosnia and Herzegovina) Harun Karic	(The Gambia) Muhammed Sanneh	(Nigeria) Williams Manji	(Montenegro) Danin Talović				(Uzbekistan) Abdugani Kamolov	(Lebanon) Mohamad Kdouh (Ukraine) Mykhaylo Kaluhin
Alay Osh	(Azerbaijan) Ramin Ahmedov	(Azerbaijan) Ildar Alekperov	(Russia) Arsen Dzhioev	(Russia) Suliman Murtazaev	(Russia) Eltay Myrzaev	(Russia) Gabil Nurakhmedov	(Ukraine) Roman Yalovenko	(Ukraine) Oleksiy Zinkevych				(Uzbekistan) Ismoil Abdurakhmonov (Uzbekistan) Sarvar Ablaev (Uzbekistan) Jamshid Kobulov (Uzbekistan) Ildar Mamatkazin (Uzbekistan) Mirzokhid Mamatkhonov (Uzbekistan) Nuriddin Nuriddinov (Uzbekistan) Mukhammadali Tursunov	
Alga Bishkek	(Moldova) Dmitri Stajila	(Russia) Islam Badalov	(Ukraine) Vitaliy Pryndeta	(Ukraine) Vladyslav Prylyopa									
Asiagoal Bishkek												(Uzbekistan) Azamat Maksumov (Uzbekistan) Timur Nabiev	
Bars Issyk-Kul	(Belarus) Aleksey Abramov	(Russia) Bogdan Logachev	(Russia) Grigoriy Minosyan	(Russia) Dmitri Velikorodny									(Russia) Vsevolod Ermakov (Russia) Rustam Khalnazarov (Russia) Timofey Kostenko (Russia) Nikita Lysenko (Russia) Aleksey Solovjev (Russia) Vitali Zaprudskikh
Bishkek City	(Brazil) Alemão	(Brazil) Celso	(Brazil) Cristiano	(Brazil) Julinho	(Brazil) Taylon	(Germany) Flodyn Baloki	(Russia) Igor Gubanov	(Russia) Ivan Solovyov	(Ukraine) Mykyta Peterman				
Dordoi Bishkek	(Italy) Pape Lo	(Serbia) Aleksa Mrdja	(Ukraine) Vladyslav Kobylyanskyi	(Ukraine) Oleksiy Lobov	(Ukraine) Yuriy Senytskyi	(Ukraine) Volodymyr Zaimenko							(Serbia) Luka Đorđević
Ilbirs Bishkek	(Cameroon) Sauveur Mbaibe	(Ukraine) Mykhaylo Hotra	(Ukraine) Nazar Vyzdryk									(Uzbekistan) Dadakhon Yusupov	
Kyrgyzaltyn	(Azerbaijan) Andrey Popovich	(Kazakhstan) Temirbek Darmenov	(Ukraine) Yevhen Chumak									(Uzbekistan) Sherzod Abdullaev	
Muras United	(Azerbaijan) Dmytro Nahiyev	(Belarus) Denis Yaskovich	(Benin) Charbel Gomez	(Ukraine) Artem Bilyi	(Ukraine) Ihor Honchar	(Ukraine) Hlib Hrachov	(Ukraine) Orest Kostyk	(Ukraine) Serhiy Kulynych	(Ukraine) Oleh Marchuk	(Ukraine) Yuriy Mate		(Uzbekistan) Azizbek Koshibkhonov	
Neftchi	(Kazakhstan) Sanzhar Abduvaitov	(Russia) Aleksey Kostyuk	(Russia) Mark Krasnov	(Russia) Aleksei Kozlov								(Uzbekistan) Farkhod Mirakhmatov (Uzbekistan) Sirozhiddin Bashriddinov	
OshSU Aldier	(Belarus) Dzmitry Zinovich	(Brazil) João Gabriel	(Brazil) Pedro	(Brazil) Richard	(Kazakhstan) Arman Altaev	(Russia) Mikhail Gubanov	(Russia) Yaroslav Shatalin	(Ukraine) Andriy Amonov				(Uzbekistan) Khushnud Bozorov (Uzbekistan) Rustam Kuchkorov (Uzbekistan) Shokhrukhbek Muratov (Uzbekistan) Otabek Muminov (Uzbekistan) Ismoildzhon Okhundzhonov (Uzbekistan) Akmal Rakhimov (Uzbekistan) Shukurjon Rustamjonov (Uzbekistan) Maradona Safarov (Uzbekistan) Bekhruz Shodmonov (Uzbekistan) Andrey Sidorov (Uzbekistan) Saidumar Sodikov (Uzbekistan) Jasurbek Umrzokov	
Uzgen	(Colombia) César Benavides	(Colombia) Ethan Lizalda	(Ukraine) Maksym Potopalskyi	(Ukraine) Ivan Zotko								(Turkmenistan) Mihail Titow (Uzbekistan) Islam Abdullaev (Uzbekistan) Izzatilla Abdullaev (Uzbekistan) Jakhongir Kushokov (Uzbekistan) Javokhir Sokhibov	
Talant	(Russia) Valeriy Murzakov	(Russia) Mikhail Ponomarenko	(Spain) Monir Abdeselam	(Ukraine) Maksym Parshykov	(Ukraine) Yaroslav Shapovalov							(South Korea) Ji-hun Park (Uzbekistan) Ulugbek Sharipov (Uzbekistan) Nurmukhammad Toshpulatov	

== League table ==
Pos	Team	Pld	W	D	L	GF	GA	GD	Pts	Qualification or relegation
1	Bars Issyk-Kul (C)	26	19	4	3	51	21	+30	61	
2	Muras United	26	19	3	4	59	24	+35	60	Qualification for the Silk Way Cup group stage and AFC Challenge League qualifying play-off round
3	Abdysh-Ata	26	17	3	6	47	29	+18	54	Qualification for the Silk Way Cup qualifying round
4	Dordoi Bishkek	26	16	6	4	42	27	+15	54	Qualification for AFC Challenge League qualifying play-off round
5	Alay Osh	26	15	4	7	44	26	+18	49	
6	OshSU-Aldier	26	12	6	8	39	32	+7	42	
7	Uzgen	26	10	5	11	33	27	+6	35	
8	Talant	26	10	2	14	31	37	−6	32	
9	Neftchi Kochkor-Ata	26	7	5	14	33	40	−7	26	
10	Kyrgyzaltyn	26	7	4	15	22	49	−27	25	
11	Alga Bishkek	26	6	6	14	27	37	−10	24	
12	Ilbirs Bishkek	26	5	6	15	23	47	−24	21	
13	Bishkek City	26	5	4	17	26	48	−22	19	
14	Asiagoal Bishkek (R)	26	4	2	20	24	57	−33	14	Relegation to Second League

Source: KPFL
Rules for classification: 1) Points; 2) Head-to-head points; 3) Head-to-head goal difference; 4) Head-to-head goals scored; 5) Goal difference; 6) Goals scored.
(C) Champions; (R) Relegated

=== Results ===
Clubs play each other twice for a total of 26 matches each.

Home \ Away	ABD	ALA	ALG	ASB	BAR	BIC	DOR	ILB	KYR	MUR	NEF	OSH	OZG	TAL
Abdysh-Ata		1–3	1–0	3–1	1–2	3–0	0–1	2–0	0–0	0–3	1–2	1–0	1–0	3–0
Alay Osh	4–0		1–1	4–2	0–1	4–0	1–2	1–0	2–1	2–1	4–0	2–2	1–0	0–2
Alga Bishkek	1–0	2–1		1–0	1–2	0–0	1–3	2–1	6–0	2–0	1–2	0–0	1–2	2–1
Asiagoal Bishkek	0–3	2–1	2–1		1–1	1–0	1–2	1–2	0–1	2–6	0–5	1–3	0–2	3–4
Bars Issyk-Kul	1–1	3–0	2–0	6–2		4–3	5–1	3–0	2–0	2–0	0–1	2–1	0–0	2–1
Bishkek City	2–3	0–0	3–1	0–1	0–1		0–3	0–1	1–1	1–0	1–1	0–2	3–1	1–2
Dordoi Bishkek	0–1	1–1	1–1	2–1	1–3	3–0		2–1	1–1	3–1	3–2	2–1	1–0	3–2
Ilbirs Bishkek	2–2	1–4	2–0	1–0	0–2	2–3	2–0		2–0	1–3	2–2	1–3	1–3	1–2
Kyrgyzaltyn	2–6	2–0	0–1	1–0	1–3	2–1	0–1	1–1		1–3	1–0	2–4	0–4	0–2
Muras United	3–0	2–1	1–0	0–0	1–2	4–1	1–1	4–1	3–0		4–1	3–1	1–0	2–1
Neftchi Kochkor-Ata	0–1	2–0	1–1	2–1	0–1	0–1	0–1	2–2	1–3	1–2		4–1	3–3	1–0
OshSU-Aldier	1–4	1–0	2–2	1–0	1–1	0–3	2–2	4–1	2–0	1–0	1–0		2–0	2–1
Uzgen	2–5	0–1	1–0	1–2	0–1	1–2	0–0	0–0	0–3	1–1	3–2	2–0		2–1
Talant	1–2	1–2	2–1	1–0	0–3	0–3	0–2	1–0	2–0	1–3	1–1	2–1	1–0	

Source: Flashscore
Legend: Blue = home team win; Yellow = draw; Red = away team win.

== By match played ==
Team ╲ Round	1	2	3	4	5	6	7	8	9	10	11	12	13	14	15	16	17	18	19	20	21	22	23	24	25	26
Abdysh-Ata	W	L	L	W	W	W	L	W	W	W	W	D	L	D	W	W	W	W								
Alay Osh	W	W	W	W	W	L	W	W	W	W	L	D	W	D	W	L	L									
Alga Bishkek	L	L	L	D	L	L	W	W	L	L	W	L	W	P	L	W	L	D								
Asiagoal Bishkek	L	D	L	D	L	L	L	L	L	L	W	W	L	W	L	L	L	L								
Bars Issyk-Kul	L	D	W	D	W	W	W	L	W	W	W	W	D	W	D	L	W	P								
Bishkek City	W	L	L	L	L	L	D	L	W	L	L	L														
Dordoi Bishkek	D	W	W	W	W	W	D	D	L	W	D															
Ilbirs Bishkek	L	D	W	W	D	L	L	L	L	L	D															
Kyrgyzaltyn	W	W	L	L	L	W	L	D	W	L	L															
Muras United	W	W	W	D	W	W	W	W	W	L	D	W														
Neftchi Kochkor-Ata	L	W	W	L	D	W	D	D	L	L	D	L														
OshSU-Aldier	D	L	L	D	L	W	W	W	L	W	L															
Uzgen	L	L	W	D	D	L	D	D	W	W	L	L														
Talant	W	D	L	L	D	L	L	L	L	W	W	W														

Updated to match(es) played on 14 September 2025. Source: Flashscore
W = Win; D = Draw; L = Loss; P = Postponed

== Statistics ==
=== Goalscorers ===
As of match played 3 November 2025

Rank	Player	Club	Goals
1	(Ukraine) Oleksiy Zinkevych	Alay Osh	16
2	(Brazil) Richard	OshSU Aldier	15
3	(Kyrgyzstan) Maksat Alygulov	Muras United	11
3	(Kyrgyzstan) Mirlan Murzayev	Bars	11
5	(Brazil) Riquelme	Abdysh-Ata	10
6	(Kyrgyzstan) Eldar Moldozhunusov	Neftchi Kochkor-Ata	9
7	(Brazil) Barreto	Abdysh-Ata	8
7	(Bosnia and Herzegovina) Harun Karic	Abdysh-Ata	8
7	(Kyrgyzstan) Kimi Merk	Dordoi Bishkek	8
7	(Kyrgyzstan) Arsen Sharshenbekov	Asiagoal Bishkek	8

=== Own goals ===
- (Ukraine) Ivan Zotko - Bishkek City vs Uzgen (6 March 2025)
- (Kyrgyzstan) Artem Istrashkin - Alga Bishkek vs Muras United (6 March 2025)
- (Kyrgyzstan) Almazbek Malikov - Asiagoal Bishkek vs Bars Issyk-Kul (10 March 2025)

=== Hat-tricks ===
Player	For	Against	Result	Date	Ref
(Kyrgyzstan) Eldar Moldozhunusov	Neftchi Kochkor-Ata	OshSU-Aldier	4–1 (H)	12 March 2025	
(Ukraine) Oleksiy Zinkevych	Alay Osh	Ilbirs Bishkek	4–1 (A)	19 September 2025	
(Turkmenistan) Mihail Titow	Uzgen	Kyrgyzaltyn	4–0 (A)	3 November 2025	
