= 2026 Kyrgyz Higher League =

Kyrgyz Higher League
- Season: 2026
- Dates: March 2026– November 2026
- Matches: 32
- Goals: 71 (2.22 per match)
- All statistics correct as of 30 March 2026.

The 2026 Kyrgyz Higher League or 2026 Jogorku Liga is the 35th season of top division association football in Kyrgyzstan, organized by the Kyrgyz Football Union. From this year the league has been expanded from 14 teams to 16 teams. Prior to the season, the league was renamed the Kyrgyz Higher League. At the conclusion of the season, the last-place team will be automatically relegated to the Kyrgyz First League while the first-place team from that league will automatically be promoted to the Higher League.

== Teams ==
=== Team changes ===
The following teams have changed division since the 2025 season.

- FC Asia Talas
- FC Toktogul

Last season, Asiagoal Bishkek originally relegated but stay from top division.

Locations of teams in the 2025 Kyrgyz Premier League

Note: Table lists in alphabetical order.

Team	Location	Venue	Capacity
Abdysh-Ata	Kant	Stadion Sportkompleks Abdysh-Ata	3,000
Alay Osh	Osh	Suyumbayev Stadion	11,200
Alga Bishkek	Bishkek	Dolen Omurzakov Stadium	23,000
FC Asia Talas	Talas	Talas Central Stadium	5,000
Asiagoal Bishkek	Bishkek	Dolen Omurzakov Stadium	23,000
Bars Issyk-Kul	Karakol	Yntymak Arena	3,380
Bishkek City	Bishkek	Dolen Omurzakov Stadium	23,000
Dordoi Bishkek	Bishkek	Dolen Omurzakov Stadium	23,000
Ilbirs Bishkek	Bishkek	Stadium FC FFKR	1,000
Kyrgyzaltyn	Kara-Balta	Stadion Manas Kara-Balta	
Muras United	Jalal-Abad	Kurmanbek Stadium	4,500
Neftchi	Kochkor-Ata	Stadion Neftyannik Kochkor-Ata	5,000
OshSU Aldier	Osh	Suyumbayev Stadion	4,000
Uzgen	Özgön	Red Petroleum Arena	2,240
Talant	Besh-Küngöy	Sport City Stadion	1,500
Toktogul	Toktogul	Ergesh Ormonov Stadium	3,450

== League table ==
Pos	Team	Pld	W	D	L	GF	GA	GD	Pts	Qualification or relegation
1	Bars Issyk-Kul (C, Q)	25	17	4	4	71	33	+38	55	Qualification for at least AFC Challenge League qualifying play-off round
2	FC Asia Talas	25	14	7	4	57	38	+19	49	Qualification for the Silk Way Cup group stage
3	Alga Bishkek	25	14	7	4	45	29	+16	49	Qualification for the Silk Way Cup qualifying round
4	Muras United	24	13	8	3	49	23	+26	47	
5	Uzgen	24	15	2	7	52	32	+20	47	
6	Alay Osh	25	12	6	7	33	31	+2	42	
7	Talant	25	8	10	7	33	24	+9	34	
8	Toktogul	24	9	4	11	28	35	−7	31	
9	Bishkek City	25	7	9	9	30	33	−3	30	
10	Neftchi Kochkor-Ata	25	9	3	13	33	42	−9	30	
11	Ilbirs Bishkek	25	6	10	9	29	38	−9	28	
12	OshSU-Aldier	25	7	7	11	35	47	−12	28	
13	Dordoi Bishkek	24	7	6	11	37	35	+2	27	
14	Asiagoal Bishkek	25	4	9	12	29	43	−14	21	
15	Abdysh-Ata	25	3	6	16	19	49	−30	15	Relegation to First League
16	Kyrgyzaltyn	25	1	6	18	19	67	−48	9	Relegation to First League

Updated to match(es) played on 13 October 2026. Source: KPFL
Rules for classification: 1) Points; 2) Head-to-head points; 3) Head-to-head goal difference; 4) Head-to-head goals scored; 5) Goal difference; 6) Goals scored.
(C) Champions; (Q) Qualified for the phase indicated

== Statistics ==
=== Goalscorers ===
As of match played 3 August 2026

Rank	Player	Club	Goals
1	(Kyrgyzstan) Erbol Atabayev	Muras United	15
2	(Russia) Ilya Karpuk	Ilbirs Bishkek	10
3	(Ukraine) Mykola Ahapov	FC Asia Talas	9
4	(Colombia) David Polanco	Talant/Dordoi Bishkek	8
5	(Azerbaijan) Ramin Ahmedov	Uzgen	7
5	(Kyrgyzstan) Ernist Batyrkanov	Dordoi Bishkek	7
5	(Georgia (country)) Temur Chogadze	Bars Issyk-Kul	7
5	(Belarus) Vladimir Maslovskiy	OshSU-Aldier	7
5	(Kyrgyzstan) Kimi Merk	Alga Bishkek	7
5	(Spain) Albert Torras	Bars Issyk-Kul	7
5	(Kyrgyzstan) Kayrat Zhyrgalbek uulu	Bars Issyk-Kul	7
5	(Ukraine) Oleksiy Zinkevych	Alga Bishkek	7
