= 2024 Kyrgyz Premier League =

Kyrgyz Premier League
- Season: 2024
- Dates: 28 March 2024–28 November 2024
- Champions: FC Abdysh-Ata Kant
- Relegated: Kyrgyzaltyn
- Matches: 125
- Goals: 329 (2.63 per match)
- Biggest home win: Abdysh-Ata Kant 5–0 FC Alga Bishkek (9 May 2024)
- Biggest away win: Ilbirs Bishkek 3–4 Muras United (29 October 2024); Kyrgyzaltyn 0–5 Abdysh-Ata Kant (9 April 2024)
- Highest scoring: Ilbirs Bishkek 3–4 Muras United (29 October 2024)
- All statistics correct as of 21 November 2024.

The 2024 Kyrgyz Premier League was the 33rd season of the Kyrgyzstan League, Kyrgyzstan's top division of association football organised by the Football Federation of Kyrgyz Republic.

== Teams ==
=== Team overview ===
Locations of teams in the 2024 Kyrgyz Premier League

Note: Table lists in alphabetical order.

Team	Location	Venue	Capacity
Abdysh-Ata Kant	Kant	Stadion Sportkompleks Abdysh-Ata	3,000
Alay Osh	Osh	Suyumbayev Stadion	11,200
Alga Bishkek	Bishkek	Dolen Omurzakov Stadium	23,000
Dordoi Bishkek	Bishkek	Dolen Omurzakov Stadium	23,000
Ilbirs Bishkek	Bishkek	Stadium FC FFKR	1,000
Kyrgyzaltyn	Kara-Balta	Stadion Manas Kara-Balta	
Muras United	Jalal-Abad	Kurmanbek Stadium	4,500
Neftchi	Kochkor-Ata	Stadion Neftyannik Kochkor-Ata	5,000
OshSU Aldier	Osh	Suyumbayev Stadion	4,000
Talant	Kant	Sport City Stadion	1,500

=== Personnel and kits ===
Note: Flags indicate national team as has been defined under FIFA eligibility rules. Players and Managers may hold more than one non-FIFA nationality.

Team	Manager	Captain	Kit manufacturer	Shirt sponsor
Abdysh-Ata Kant	(Uzbekistan) Islam Akhmedov		Joma	Nitro FRESH
Alay Osh				
Alga Bishkek				
Dordoi Bishkek	(Russia) Maxim Lisitsyn		Kelme	-
Ilbirs Bishkek				
Kyrgyzaltyn				
Muras United	(Russia) Andrei Kanchelskis	(Kyrgyzstan) Bakhtiyar Duyshobekov		
Neftchi				
OshSU Aldier				
Talant				

=== Managerial changes ===
Team	Outgoing manager	Manner of departure	Date of vacancy	Position in table	Replaced by	Date of appointment	Position in table
Dordoi Bishkek	(Kyrgyzstan) Zakir Dzhalilov	Mutual Termination	17 November 2023	End of Season	(Russia) Maxim Lisitsyn	27 December 2023	Pre Season
Muras United	(Kyrgyzstan) Valery Berezovsky			End of Season	(Russia) Andrei Kanchelskis	25 December 2023	Pre Season

== Foreign players ==
A team can use only five foreign players on the field in each game.

Club	Player 1	Player 2	Player 3	Player 4	Player 5	Player 6	Player 7	Player 8	Player 9	Player 10	Player 11	AFC Players	Former Players
Abdysh-Ata Kant	(Brazil) Luccas Barreto	(Ghana) Emmanuel Yaghr	(Serbia) Aleksa Mrdja	(Turkey) Arda Çakirli	(Turkmenistan) Teýmur Çaryýew								(Turkmenistan) Süleýman Muhadow
Alay Osh	(Russia) Eltay Myrzaev	(Russia) Gabil Nurakhmedov	(Russia) Mikhail Ponomarenko	(Uzbekistan) Abdulkarim Mukhamedov	(Uzbekistan) Sarvar Ablaev	(Uzbekistan) Nodirbek Ibragimov	(Uzbekistan) Murodkhuzha Jabborov	(South Korea) Choi Seung-in	(Australia) Alex Baker	(Turkmenistan) Süleýman Muhadow			(Ukraine) Kyrylo Protsyshyn (Uzbekistan) Malikshokh Rasulov
Alga Bishkek	(Ukraine) Vladyslav Prylyopa												(Ukraine) Dmytro Sydorenko (Uzbekistan) Shakhzodbek Suyunov
Dordoi Bishkek	(Belarus) Pavel Staskevich	(Latvia) Ņikita Kovaļonoks	(Ukraine) Anatoliy Kozlenko	(Ukraine) Oleksiy Lobov	(Ukraine) Yuriy Senytskyi	(Ukraine) Volodymyr Zayimenko							
Ilbirs Bishkek													
Kyrgyzaltyn	(Kazakhstan) Emir Dautov	(Russia) Islam Badalov	(Russia) Ayub Batsuyev	(Russia) Artem Kozhukhar	(Uzbekistan) Abdurakhmon Abdulkhakov	(Uzbekistan) Sherzod Abdullaev	(Uzbekistan) Mukhriddin Akhmedov	(Uzbekistan) Murod Tuychibaev					(Russia) Vladislav Aleksin (Uzbekistan) Shokhrukhbek Muratov
Muras United	(Belarus) Denis Yaskovich	(Ivory Coast) Amara Traoré	(Russia) Igor Gubanov	(Russia) Ivan Solovjev	(Russia) Aleksandr Timchenko	(Ukraine) Oleksandr Holikov	(Ukraine) Oleg Marchuk	(Ukraine) Yuriy Mate	(Ukraine) Andriy Mishchenko	(Ukraine) Kyrylo Protsyshyn	(Ukraine) Yevgeniy Terzi	(Uzbekistan) Azizbek Koshibkhonov	(Belarus) Kiryl Sidarenka (Russia) Roman Izotov (Russia) Andrei Zorin (Ukraine) Mykhaylo Kaluhin
Neftchi	(Afghanistan) Amredin Sharifi	(Ivory Coast) Dramane Koné	(Kazakhstan) Irisdavlat Khakimov	(Moldova) Mihail Paius	(Nigeria) David Candy	(Russia) Vladislav Aleksin	(Russia) Andrei Zorin	(Ukraine) Valeriy Stepanenko	(Uzbekistan) Sherzodbek Abduraimov	(Uzbekistan) Dadakhon Yusupov			(Russia) Valeriy Mazur (Ukraine) Yevhen Protasov (Uzbekistan) Mukhammadali Tursunov
OshSU Aldier	(Ukraine) Andriy Amonov	(Ukraine) Yevhen Chumak	(Uzbekistan) Akhmadzhon Anvarov	(Uzbekistan) Rustam Kuchkorov	(Uzbekistan) Sarvar Mirzaev	(Uzbekistan) Otabek Muminov	(Uzbekistan) Ismoildzhon Okhundzhonov	(Uzbekistan) Akmal Rakhimov	(Uzbekistan) Maradona Safarov	(Uzbekistan) Andrey Sidorov	(Uzbekistan) Saidumar Sodikov	(Uzbekistan) Shokhrukhbek Muratov	(Russia) Yaroslav Shatalin
Talant	(Ghana) Cobblah Prince											(South Korea) Ji-hun Park	(South Korea) Chan-woo Kim

== League table ==
Pos	Team	Pld	W	D	L	GF	GA	GD	Pts	Qualification or relegation
1	Abdysh-Ata Kant (C)	27	22	3	2	67	15	+52	69	Qualification for 2025–26 AFC Challenge League qualifying play-off round
2	Dordoi Bishkek	27	17	8	2	43	18	+25	59	
3	Muras United (Note: as 2024 Kyrgyzstan Cup winners.)	27	16	6	5	50	34	+16	54	Qualification for 2025–26 AFC Challenge League qualifying play-off round
4	Alay Osh	27	13	8	6	37	29	+8	47	
5	Neftchi Kochkor-Ata	27	8	7	12	36	40	−4	31	
6	Ilbirs Bishkek	27	8	2	17	30	48	−18	26	
7	OshMU Aldier	27	6	7	14	28	44	−16	25	
8	Talant	27	6	6	15	20	43	−23	24	
9	Alga Bishkek	27	5	5	17	29	48	−19	20 (Note: Head-to-head points: Alga Bishkek 6; Kyrgyzaltyn 3.)	
10	Kyrgyzaltyn (R)	27	4	8	15	20	41	−21	20	Relegation to Second League

Source: KPFL
Rules for classification: 1) Points; 2) Head-to-head points; 3) Head-to-head goal difference; 4) Head-to-head goals scored; 5) Goal difference; 6) Goals scored.
(C) Champions; (R) Relegated

== Results ==
=== Round 1–18 ===
Home \ Away	ABD	ALA	ALG	DOR	ILB	KYR	MUR	NEF	OSH	TAL
Abdysh-Ata Kant	—	2–1	5–0	4–0	5–1	1–0	5–0	2–1	2–0	2–0
Alay Osh	0–1	—	4–1	0–0	3–1	2–2	1–1	1–1	1–0	0–0
Alga Bishkek	1–3	1–1	—	1–1	1–2	1–2	1–3	0–2	4–2	4–1
Dordoi Bishkek	3–0	2–0	2–0	—	2–0	1–0	1–1	0–0	4–0	0–0
Ilbirs Bishkek	0–5	0–2	3–0	1–2	—	2–1	0–1	1–2	4–0	1–2
Kyrgyzaltyn	0–5	0–1	0–1	1–4	1–1	—	0–1	1–0	2–4	1–1
Muras United	1–1	1–2	2–0	1–2	3–1	2–1	—	1–3	1–0	3–1
Neftchi Kochkorata	0–4	2–4	1–0	1–2	3–2	1–2	4–1	—	2–2	0–1
OshSU Aldier	0–2	2–3	2–2	0–1	2–1	1–0	1–2	1–2	—	1–2
Talant	0–3	1–2	3–2	0–2	0–2	3–0	0–4	0–2	1–1	—

Source: Flashscore
Legend: Blue = home team win; Yellow = draw; Red = away team win.

=== Round 19–27 ===
Home \ Away	ABD	ALA	ALG	DOR	ILB	KYR	MUR	NEF	OSH	TAL
Abdysh-Ata Kant	—	3–0	3–2	1–0		1–1				2–0
Alay Osh		—		0–1	1–0	1–1		2–1	1–1	
Alga Bishkek		1–2	—	0–1					0–2	0–0
Dordoi Bishkek				—	4–2	0–0	3–3	1–1		
Ilbirs Bishkek	0–0		1–0		—		3–4	1–0		
Kyrgyzaltyn			0–1		0–1	—			0–0	1–0
Muras United	3–1	3–1	0–1			2–0	—			4–1
Neftchi Kochkorata	1–2		2–4			2–2	0–1	—	0–0	2–2
OshSU Aldier	0–2				3–2		0–0	0–0	—	
Talant		0–1		0–2	1–0				0–1	—

Source: Flashscore
Legend: Blue = home team win; Yellow = draw; Red = away team win.

== Season statistics ==
=== Top scorers ===
As of match played 13 October 2024

Rank	Player	Club	Goals
1	(Kyrgyzstan) Atay Dzhumashev	Abdysh-Ata Kant	9
2	(Kyrgyzstan) Yryskeldi Madanov	Ilbirs Bishkek	8
3	(Kyrgyzstan) Suyuntbek Mamyraliyev	Dordoi Bishkek	7
4	(Kyrgyzstan) Murolimzhon Akhmedov	Dordoi Bishkek	6
4	(Kyrgyzstan) Ryskeldi Artykbayev	Kyrgyzaltyn	6
4	(Kyrgyzstan) Gulzhigit Borubaev	Alga Bishkek	6
4	(Afghanistan) Amredin Sharifi	Neftchi Kochkor-Ata	6
4	(Kyrgyzstan) Akramzhon Umarov	Alay Osh	6
4	(Kyrgyzstan) Kayrat Zhyrgalbek uulu	Abdysh-Ata Kant	6
10	(Kyrgyzstan) Farkhat Musabekov	Abdysh-Ata Kant	5
10	(Kyrgyzstan) Dastanbek Toktosunov	Neftchi Kochkor-Ata	5

=== Own goals ===
- (Kyrgyzstan) Khristiyan Brauzman - for Alay Osh vs Abdysh-Ata Kant (29 March 2024)
- (Kyrgyzstan) Daniel Razulov - for Neftchi Kochkor-Ata vs Ilbirs Bishkek (11 April 2024)
