= 2023 Kyrgyz Premier League =

Kyrgyz Premier League
- Season: 2023
- Dates: 2 April – 5 November 2023
- Champions: Abdysh-Ata Kant (2nd title)
- Relegated: Kara-Balta
- AFC Challenge League: Abdysh-Ata Kant
- Matches: 135
- Goals: 382 (2.83 per match)
- Top goalscorer: Danin Talovic (14 goal)
- Biggest home win: Dordoi Bishkek 7–0 Kara-Balta
- All statistics correct as of 5 November 2023.

The 2023 Kyrgyz Premier League was the 32nd season of the Kyrgyzstan League, Kyrgyzstan's top division of association football organized by the Football Federation of Kyrgyz Republic.

== Teams ==
=== Team overview ===
Locations of teams in the 2021 Kyrgyz Premier League

Note: Table lists in alphabetical order.

Team	Location	Venue	Capacity
Abdysh-Ata Kant	Kant	Stadion Sportkompleks Abdysh-Ata	3,000
Alay Osh	Osh	Suyumbayev Stadion	11,200
Alga Bishkek	Bishkek	Dolen Omurzakov Stadium	23,000
Dordoi Bishkek	Bishkek	Dolen Omurzakov Stadium	23,000
Ilbirs Bishkek	Bishkek	Stadium FC FFKR	1,000
Kara-Balta	Kara-Balta	Manas Stadium	4,000
Muras United	Jalal-Abad	Kurmanbek Stadium	4,500
Neftchi	Kochkor-Ata	Stadion Neftyannik Kochkor-Ata	5,000
OshSU Aldier	Osh	Suyumbayev Stadion	4,000
Talant	Kant	Sport City Stadion	1,500

=== Personnel and kits ===
Note: Flags indicate national team as has been defined under FIFA eligibility rules. Players and Managers may hold more than one non-FIFA nationality.

Team	Manager	Captain	Kit manufacturer	Shirt sponsor
Abdysh-Ata Kant				
Alay Osh				
Alga Bishkek				
Dordoi Bishkek				
Ilbirs Bishkek				
Kara-Balta				
Muras United				
Neftchi				
OshSU Aldier				
Talant				

=== Managerial changes ===
Team	Outgoing manager	Manner of departure	Date of vacancy	Position in table	Replaced by	Date of appointment	Position in table
Dordoi Bishkek							

--->

== Foreign players ==
The number of foreign players is restricted to five per Kyrgyz Premier League team. A team can use only five foreign players on the field in each game.

== League table ==
Pos	Team	Pld	W	D	L	GF	GA	GD	Pts	Qualification or relegation
1	Abdysh-Ata Kant (C)	27	17	6	4	58	22	+36	57	Qualification for AFC Challenge League play-off round
2	Alay Osh	27	14	9	4	36	23	+13	51	
3	Dordoi Bishkek	27	14	8	5	54	24	+30	50	
4	Alga Bishkek	27	12	8	7	52	35	+17	44	
5	Muras United	27	12	6	9	41	34	+7	42	
6	Talant	27	8	10	9	32	38	−6	34	
7	Neftchi Kochkor-Ata	27	9	5	13	29	38	−9	32	
8	Ilbirs Bishkek	27	7	5	15	31	53	−22	26	
9	OshSU Aldier	27	6	5	16	29	52	−23	23	
10	Kara-Balta (R)	27	3	4	20	20	63	−43	13	Relegation to Second League

Source: KPFL
Rules for classification: 1) Points; 2) Head-to-head points; 3) Head-to-head goal difference; 4) Head-to-head goals scored; 5) Goal difference; 6) Goals scored.
(C) Champions; (R) Relegated

== Results ==
=== Round 1–18 ===
Home \ Away	ABD	ALA	ALG	DOR	ILB	KAR	MUR	NEF	OSH	TAL
Abdysh-Ata Kant	—	2–1	4–0	1–1	3–1	7–0	3–0	0–1	3–0	0–0
Alay Osh	2–1	—	0–0	2–1	1–0	2–0	1–0	2–1	1–0	0–0
Alga Bishkek	1–1	1–1	—	1–2	0–3	2–0	2–2	1–1	1–1	4–1
Dordoi Bishkek	1–0	1–1	0–2	—	6–0	5–0	1–1	3–0	2–0	5–0
Ilbirs Bishkek	0–3	1–1	1–3	2–2	—	1–1	0–4	1–1	3–0	0–1
Kara-Balta	0–4	0–4	2–6	0–2	1–0	—	1–2	0–3	1–2	1–1
Muras United	0–1	1–0	2–2	1–1	3–0	2–1	—	1–0	0–2	1–2
Neftchi Kochkorata	0–0	1–2	1–0	2–1	1–0	2–3	0–2	—	1–0	3–2
OshSU Aldier	1–2	0–0	2–6	0–3	2–3	3–0	0–0	2–3	—	1–1
Talant	2–2	1–1	0–4	1–1	2–0	0–0	1–2	2–1	3–4	—

Source: Flashscore
Legend: Blue = home team win; Yellow = draw; Red = away team win.

=== Round 19–27 ===
Home \ Away	ABD	ALA	ALG	DOR	ILB	KAR	MUR	NEF	OSH	TAL
Abdysh-Ata Kant	—	1–2	—	—	—	4–2	3–1	1–0	3–2	—
Alay Osh		—	0–2	3–2	1–3	2–0	—	—	—	1–1
Alga Bishkek	1–2	—	—	2–1	—	2–1	—	0–1	1–0	—
Dordoi Bishkek	1–1	—	—	—	—	2–1	2–1	3–2	4–0	—
Ilbirs Bishkek	0–3	—	1–5	0–1	—	—	—	—	—	2–1
Kara-Balta	—	—	—	—	0–2	—	—	0–0	0–1	0–1
Muras United	—	0–1	3–3	—	4–1	1–5	—	—	—	1–0
Neftchi Kochkorata	—	1–1	—	—	1–3	—	1–3	—	—	0–3
OshSU Aldier	—	2–3	—	—	2–2	—	0–3	2–1	—	—
Talant	2–3	—	2–0	0–0	—	—	—	—	2–0	—

Source: Flashscore
Legend: Blue = home team win; Yellow = draw; Red = away team win.

=== By match played ===
Team ╲ Round	1	2	3	4	5	6	7	8	9	10	11	12	13	14	15	16	17	18	19	20	21	22	23	24	25	26	27
Abdysh-Ata Kant	D	W	W	W	D	W	L	W	D	L	W	W	W	W	W	D	D	L	W	L	W	D	W	W	W	W	W
Alay Osh	W	W	D	L	W	D	D	W	L	W	W	D	W	W	D	D	D	W	L	W	W	W	W	L	D	D	W
Alga Bishkek	W	D	D	W	D	D	W	D	W	W	W	D	L	L	D	W	L	L	L	L	W	W	L	W	W	D	W
Dordoi Bishkek	D	L	W	L	W	D	W	D	D	W	W	W	W	L	D	D	W	W	W	W	L	D	W	W	L	W	D
Ilbirs Bishkek	L	L	L	L	L	W	L	L	L	D	L	D	L	W	D	D	W	L	W	L	L	L	W	W	D	W	L
Kara-Balta	L	D	L	L	L	L	L	L	W	D	L	D	L	L	L	L	L	W	L	D	L	L	L	L	W	L	L
Muras United	D	D	L	D	W	L	W	W	W	L	W	D	W	W	L	D	W	L	W	W	L	W	L	L	L	D	W
Neftchi Kochkorata	W	W	L	W	L	D	W	L	W	W	L	L	L	W	W	D	D	L	W	D	L	L	L	L	D	L	L
OshSU Aldier	L	L	W	D	D	L	L	D	L	L	L	L	W	L	W	D	L	W	L	L	W	L	L	W	D	L	L
Talant	D	D	W	W	D	W	D	D	L	L	L	D	L	L	L	D	D	W	L	W	W	W	W	L	L	D	D

Updated to match(es) played on 5 November 2023. Source:
W = Win; D = Draw; L = Loss; P = Postponed

== Season statistics ==
=== Top scorers ===
As of match played 5 November 2023

Rank	Player	Club	Goals
1	(Montenegro) Danin Talović	Dordoi Bishkek	14
2	(Ghana) Emmanuel Yaghr	Abdysh-Ata Kant	11
2	(Kyrgyzstan) Anton Zemlyanukhin	Alga Bishkek	11
4	(Kyrgyzstan) Mirbek Akhmataliyev	Abdysh-Ata Kant	10
5	(Kyrgyzstan) Maksat Alygulov	Alga Bishkek	8
5	(Kyrgyzstan) Eldar Moldozhunusov	Neftchi Kochkor-Ata	8
5	(Kyrgyzstan) Murolimzhon Akhmedov	Dordoi Bishkek	7
5	(Kyrgyzstan) Bakhtiyar Duyshobekov	Muras United	7
5	(Kyrgyzstan) Toktonaliev Nursultan	Talant	7
5	(Kyrgyzstan) Arlen Sharshenbekov	Abdysh-Ata Kant	7
5	(Kyrgyzstan) Dastanbek Toktosunov	Neftchi Kochkor-Ata	7

=== Hat-tricks ===
Player	For	Against	Result	Date	Ref
(Ukraine) Oleksiy Lobov ^{4}	Dordoi Bishkek	Talant	5–0 (H)	30 May 2023	
(Ghana) Emmanuel Yaghr	Abdysh-Ata Kant	Ilbirs Bishkek	3–0 (H)	31 May 2023	
(Kyrgyzstan) Marlen Murzakhmatov	Alga Bishkek	Ilbirs Bishkek	1–5 (A)	17 September 2023	

- ^{4} Player scored 4 goals

== Attendances ==
#	Football club	Average attendance
1	FC Alay	1,244
2	Muras United	849
3	FC Neftchi Kochkor-Ata	785
4	FC Dordoi Bishkek	644
5	OshSU Aldier	562
6	FC Abdysh-Ata Kant	343
7	FC Kara-Balta	235
8	Ilbirs Bishkek FC	212
9	FC Alga Bishkek	163
10	FC Talant	120
