= Sirozhiddin Astanakulov =

Kyrgyz footballer

Personal information
- Date of birth: 26 January 2006 (age 20)
- Place of birth: Osh, Kyrgyzstan
- Height: 1.77 m (5 ft 10 in)
- Position: Midfielder

Team information
- Current team: FC Uzgen

Youth career
- –2018: Dordoi Bishkek
- 2018–2023: MKE Ankaragücü

Senior career*
Years	Team	Apps	(Gls)
2023–2025	MKE Ankaragücü	7	(1)
2025–2026	Bodrum	1	(0)
2026–	Uzgen	6	(6)

International career^{‡}
2026–	Kyrgyzstan	2	(1)
- * Club domestic league appearances and goals as of 19:13, 6 November 2026 (UTC) ‡ National team caps and goals as of 13:33, 7 October 2026 (UTC)

Sirozhiddin Astanakulov (Kyrgyz: Сирожиддин Астанакулов; born 26 January 2006) is a professional footballer who plays for Kyrgyz Premier League club FC Uzgen and the Kyrgyzstan national team.

== Club career ==
As a youth, Astanakulov played domestically with FC Dordoi Bishkek since at least 2016. He competed with the team in the 2018 Friendship Cup and was the top scorer in the competition. Astanakulov moved to Turkey in 2018 and joined the academy of MKE Ankaragücü following a successful trial. He signed his first professional contract with the club in 2023. He scored his first league goal for the club on 22 February 2025 against Bandirmaspor one minute after entering the match as a substitute. It was unclear if Astanakulov would count as a foreign or domestic player for roster purposes because he was in the process of gaining Turkish citizenship. The issue became more relevant when Ankaragücü was relegated from the 1. Lig to the 2. Lig, a league in which foreign players are ineligible. Believing the player to be ineligible, the club terminated Astanakulov's contract on 12 November 2025.

Following his departure from MKE Ankaragücü, Astanakulov joined Bodrum of the 1. Lig with his contract set to expire 30 June 2028. In August 2026, the Turkish Football Federation Arbitration Board determined that Astanakulov's contract was wrongly terminated and ruled that Ankaragücü must pay the player's salary. Prior to the spring half of the 2026 season, Astanakulov joined Kyrgyz Premier League club FC Uzgen.

== International career ==
Born in Osh, Astanakulov is eligible to represent Kyrgyzstan and Turkey. He gained Turkish citizenship is late 2023 and was called up to the Turkey national under-18 team for a training camp in January 2024. In June 2026, he accepted a call up to the Kyrgyzstan national under-23 team for a training camp and three friendlies, marking the first time he represented his country of birth. Astanakulov made his senior international debut for Kyrgyzstan on 28 September 2026 in a friendly against the Maldives. He started the match and scored his first senior international goal in the twentieth minute of the eventual 5–0 victory.

=== International goals ===
Scores and results list Kyrgyzstan's goal tally first.

No.	Date	Venue	Opponent	Score	Result	Competition
1.	28 September 2026	Dolen Omurzakov Stadium, Bishkek, Kyrgyzstan	Maldives	2–0	5–0	Friendly
Last updated 7 October 2026

=== International career statistics ===
As of match played 4 October 2025.

Kyrgyzstan national team
Year	Apps	Goals
2026	2	1
Total	2	1
