= FC Asia Talas =

Kyrgyzstani association football club

- Founded: 2025; 1 year ago
- Ground: Talas Central Stadion
- Capacity: 5,000
- Manager: Maksim Shatskikh
- League: Kyrgyz Higher League
- Website: Website

FC Asia Talas is an Kyrgyz association football club based in Talas that currently competes in the Kyrgyz Higher League.

== Stadium ==
The club's home venue is the newly-constructed Talas Central Stadium. The 5,000-seat venue features a hybrid grass surface and meets international standards for hosting various competitions.

== History ==
Founded in November 2025, FC Asia was immediately granted a spot in the Kyrgyz Premier League for the 2026 season as the number of teams in the competition was increased. The club named highly-experienced Uzbek manager and former player Maksim Shatskikh as its first-ever head coach. In preparation for its inaugural season, the club held a training camp in Turkey. FC Asia played a friendly with FC Kyzylzhar of the Kazakhstan Premier League during the camp, resulting in a 2–1 victory. Ahead of the season, FC Asia signed several experienced domestic players including Khristiyan Brauzman, Bektur Amangeldiev, and Atay Dzhumashev, in addition to several foreign reinforcements. It played its first league match on 7 March 2026 against FC Talant. FC Asia lost the match 1–4 with Ukrainian Mykola Ahapov converting a penalty in the fifth minute for the club's first-ever league goal.

== Players ==
=== Current squad ===
Note: Flags indicate national team as defined under FIFA eligibility rules; some limited exceptions apply. Players may hold more than one non-FIFA nationality.

No.	Pos.	Nation	Player
1	GK	KGZ	Arstan Kudayberdiev
2	DF	KGZ	Christian Brauzman
3	DF	MKD	Xhelil Asani
6	DF	UKR	Bogdan Potalov
7	FW	KGZ	Maksat Alygulov
8	MF	KGZ	Bektur Amangeldiev
9	FW	UKR	Mykola Ahapov
10	FW	ENG	Olawale Tanimowo
11	DF	KGZ	Kayrat Izakov
14	MF	LAT	Aleksejs Saveļjevs
16	GK	KGZ	Seytek Urustamov
17	DF	KGZ	Artem Istrashkin
20	FW	KOS	Hasan Hyseni
21	MF	KGZ	Farkhat Musabekov
22	MF	KGZ	Nurtilek Moldaliev

No.	Pos.	Nation	Player
23	MF	GEO	Demur Chikhladze
24	DF	KGZ	Baktay Taalaybek uulu
25	GK	BLR	Roman Stepanov
26	FW	KGZ	Nurtilek Sulaymanov
27	DF	KGZ	Bakytbek Mirzalim uulu
29	MF	KGZ	Arlen Sharshenbekov
32	GK	MDA	Andrei Cojuhar
39	DF	GEO	Lado Odishvili
45	MF	KGZ	Kanatbek Ismatillaev
70	FW	KGZ	Atay Dzhumashev
77	MF	GEO	Mikheil Basheleishvili
86	GK	KGZ	Bayel Kambarbekov
87	DF	KGZ	Eldiyar Ulanbek uulu
91	FW	KGZ	Avtandil Duyshoev

== Seasons ==
Key

Champions Runners-up 3rd place

Season	League										Cup	Notes
Season	Div.	Pos.	Pl.	W	D	L	GF	GA	GD	Pts.	Cup	Notes
2026	I											
