= 2024 CAFA U-20 Championship squads =

2024 CAFA football squads

The following is a list of squads for each national team competing at the 2024 CAFA U-20 Championship. The tournament will take place in Kyrgyzstan, between 5 and 12 July 2024. It will be the second U-20 age group competition organised by the Central Asian Football Association.

Players born between 1 January 2005 and 31 December 2007 are eligible to compete in the tournament. Each team had to register a squad of minimum 18 players and maximum 23 players, minimum three of whom must have been goalkeepers. The full squad listings are below.

The age listed for each player is as of 5 July 2024, the first day of the tournament.

== Group A ==
=== Kyrgyz Republic ===
Kyrgyz Republic announced a provisional squad of 27 players on 24 June 2024.

Head coach: Mirlan Eshenov

No.	Pos.	Player	Date of birth (age)	Club
1	GK	Aziret Ysmanaliev	24 October 2005 (aged 18)	(Kyrgyz Football Union) Ilbirs
2	DF	Emir-Khan Kydyrshaev	29 April 2005 (aged 19)	(Royal Spanish Football Federation) Sant Cugat FC
3	DF	Adilet Dolotkeldiev	22 May 2005 (aged 19)	(Kyrgyz Football Union) Ilbirs
4	MF	Daniel Razulov	23 April 2005 (aged 19)	(Kyrgyz Football Union) Ilbirs
5	MF	Sardorbek Nematov	17 August 2005 (aged 18)	(Kyrgyz Football Union) Ilbirs
6	DF	Atai Eshenkulov	19 February 2005 (aged 19)	(Kyrgyz Football Union) Ilbirs
7	MF	Sultan Bokoleev	6 March 2005 (aged 19)	(Kyrgyz Football Union) Ilbirs
8	MF	Baibol Ermekov	8 September 2005 (aged 18)	(Kyrgyz Football Union) Ilbirs
9	MF	Khamza Mirlan Uulu	29 March 2005 (aged 19)	(Kyrgyz Football Union) Ilbirs
10	MF	Umar Madaminov	12 April 2005 (aged 19)	(Kyrgyz Football Union) Ilbirs
11	FW	Nurislam Oruntaev	4 February 2005 (aged 19)	(Kyrgyz Football Union) Ilbirs
12	MF	Nazhibullokh Alizhanov		(Kyrgyz Football Union) Ilbirs
13	GK	Oskon Baratov	23 January 2006 (aged 18)	(Kyrgyz Football Union) Ilbirs
14	MF	Argen Emilbekov	15 January 2006 (aged 18)	(Kyrgyz Football Union) Dordoi
15	DF	Sanzhar Anarbekov	28 March 2005 (aged 19)	(Kyrgyz Football Union) Ilbirs
16	GK	Adilet Abdyraimov		(Kyrgyz Football Union) Dordoi
17	MF	Manas Kubanychbek Uulu	19 February 2006 (aged 18)	(Kyrgyz Football Union) Ilbirs
18	MF	Kairat Abdirasulov	17 June 2005 (aged 19)	(Kyrgyz Football Union) Ilbirs
19	FW	Yryskeldi Maadanov		(Kyrgyz Football Union) Ilbirs
20	FW	Daniel Omarov	29 March 2005 (aged 19)	(Kyrgyz Football Union) Ilbirs
21	DF	Mukhtar Ishenaliev	19 March 2005 (aged 19)	(Portuguese Football Federation) SC Vista Alegre
22	MF	Emir Ernisov	16 February 2005 (aged 19)	(Kyrgyz Football Union) FC Talant
23	MF	Azamat Tashbaltaev	19 September 2005 (aged 18)	(Kyrgyz Football Union) Ilbirs

=== Tajikistan ===
The final squad of 22 players was announced on 1 July 2024.

Head coach: (Slovenia) Miloš Kostić

No.	Pos.	Player	Date of birth (age)	Club
1	GK	Mukhammad Abdulkhadov	29 June 2006 (aged 18)	(Tajikistan Football Federation) FC Panjshir
2	MF	Mukhammad Mukhammadzoda	14 April 2005 (aged 19)	(Tajikistan Football Federation) Ravshan
3	MF	Mekhrubon Khamidov	24 April 2006 (aged 18)	(Tajikistan Football Federation) Barkchi
4	DF	Bakhtovar Gayurov	3 January 2006 (aged 18)	(Tajikistan Football Federation) Barkchi
5	DF	Barakatullo Nigmatullozoda	17 August 2006 (aged 17)	(Tajikistan Football Federation) Barkchi
6	MF	Fatkhullo Olimzoda	3 August 2005 (aged 18)	(Kazakhstan Football Federation) FC Atyrau
7	FW	Masrur Gafurov	21 January 2006 (aged 18)	(Tajikistan Football Federation) Barkchi
8	DF	Dzhovidon Khushvakhtov	30 November 2005 (aged 18)	(Tajikistan Football Federation) Barkchi
9	FW	Bilol Boboev	30 June 2006 (aged 18)	(Tajikistan Football Federation) Barkchi
10	MF	Abubakr Sulaimonov	18 September 2006 (aged 17)	(Tajikistan Football Federation) Barkchi
11	FW	Oriyonmekhr Kholikzoda		(Tajikistan Football Federation) Barkchi
12	DF	Shakhbon Naimov	9 August 2007 (aged 16)	(Tajikistan Football Federation) Barkchi
13	FW	Sherzod Radzhabov		(Tajikistan Football Federation) Barkchi
14	MF	Khodzhi Abdumanon	9 January 2006 (aged 18)	(Tajikistan Football Federation) Eskhata
15	DF	Farkhod Amiri	12 September 2006 (aged 17)	(Tajikistan Football Federation) Istaravshan
16	GK	Zafari Bakhrullozoda		(Tajikistan Football Federation) FC Shodmon
17	MF	Azizbek Daliev	16 April 2005 (aged 19)	(Tajikistan Football Federation) FK Khujand
18	MF	Firdavs Rakhimov		(Tajikistan Football Federation) Barkchi
19	DF	Mikdod Rozikov		(Tajikistan Football Federation) Barkchi
20	MF	Yunus Ismatulloev	25 September 2006 (aged 17)	(Tajikistan Football Federation) Barkchi
21	DF	Rustam Kamolov	4 June 2007 (aged 17)	(Tajikistan Football Federation) Barkchi
22	MF	Azizbek Murotov		(Tajikistan Football Federation) Eskhata
23	GK	Shakhobiddin Makhmudzoda	5 January 2005 (aged 19)	(Tajikistan Football Federation) Barkchi

=== Afghanistan ===
Head coach: Mohd Taher Raufi

No.	Pos.	Player	Date of birth (age)	Club
1	GK	Faisal Saeed Khil	19 February 2005 (aged 19)	(Afghanistan Football Federation)
2	DF	Timor Shah Raofi		(Afghanistan Football Federation)
3	DF	Ehsan Ahmad Rahmani	15 January 2007 (aged 17)	(Afghanistan Football Federation)
4	DF	Hamayoun Amin		(Afghanistan Football Federation)
5		Jawad Alokoazay		(Afghanistan Football Federation)
6	MF	Ali Reza Rahimi	20 February 2006 (aged 18)	(Afghanistan Football Federation)
7	MF	Omid Rajabi	1 January 2005 (aged 19)	(Afghanistan Football Federation)
8	MF	Hakim Khan Niazi	14 August 2006 (aged 17)	(Afghanistan Football Federation)
9	FW	Enayatullah Kohi	1 February 2006 (aged 18)	(Afghanistan Football Federation)
10	MF	Farzad Tajik	14 February 2007 (aged 17)	(Afghanistan Football Federation)
11	DF	Farhad Ali Zada	26 January 2005 (aged 19)	(Afghanistan Football Federation)
12		Ahmadullah Alokozai		(Afghanistan Football Federation)
13		Mohammad Naeem Noori		(Afghanistan Football Federation)
14		Esmatullah Hadafmand		(Afghanistan Football Federation)
15	DF	Rohullah Nazari	13 December 2006 (aged 17)	(Afghanistan Football Federation)
16		Mohammad Moghaddam		(Afghanistan Football Federation)
17	FW	Roman Hamidi	22 November 2006 (aged 17)	(Afghanistan Football Federation)
18		Mir Agha Sharifi		(Afghanistan Football Federation)
19		Fereidoon Seyedi		(Afghanistan Football Federation)
20	MF	Habibullah Hotak	31 May 2007 (aged 17)	(Afghanistan Football Federation)
21		Hafizullah Abdullaye		(Afghanistan Football Federation)
22	GK	Sayed Arfan Sadat		(Afghanistan Football Federation)
23	GK	Sediqullah Hussain Khil	23 March 2006 (aged 18)	(Afghanistan Football Federation)

== Group B ==
=== Uzbekistan ===
Head coach: Rauf Inileev

No.	Pos.	Player	Date of birth (age)	Club
1	GK	Maksim Murkaev	21 February 2005 (aged 19)	(Uzbekistan Football Association)
2	DF	Ozodbek Ergashov	18 September 2006 (aged 17)	(Uzbekistan Football Association)
3	DF	Islom Anvarov	19 April 2006 (aged 18)	(Uzbekistan Football Association)
4	DF	Meyirbek Rejabaliev	25 January 2005 (aged 19)	(Uzbekistan Football Association)
5	DF	Alijon Bekmurotov	10 February 2005 (aged 19)	(Uzbekistan Football Association)
6	DF	Ozodbek Uktamov	10 July 2006 (aged 17)	(Uzbekistan Football Association)
7	MF	Oybek Urmonjonov	9 October 2006 (aged 17)	(Uzbekistan Football Association)
8	DF	Bekhruz Shukurullaev	27 October 2006 (aged 17)	(Uzbekistan Football Association)
9		Muhammad Khusanov		(Uzbekistan Football Association)
10	FW	Bekhruz Abdullaev	30 July 2005 (aged 18)	(Uzbekistan Football Association)
11	FW	Ulugbek Kenjaev	30 June 2005 (aged 19)	(Uzbekistan Football Association)
12	GK	Askarjon Kudratov	6 June 2005 (aged 19)	(Uzbekistan Football Association)
13	DF	Behruzjon Karimov	7 August 2007 (aged 16)	(Uzbekistan Football Association)
14	FW	Shodiyor Shodiboev	29 March 2006 (aged 18)	(Uzbekistan Football Association)
15		Asadulla Kutibaev	19 March 2006 (aged 18)	(Uzbekistan Football Association)
16	MF	Mukhammadjon Valiev	18 December 2005 (aged 18)	(Uzbekistan Football Association)
17	MF	Abdushukur Makhamatov	14 September 2005 (aged 18)	(Uzbekistan Football Association)
18	DF	Shokhbozbek Abduvaliev	Missing required parameter 1=month! 2005 (aged 18–19)	(Uzbekistan Football Association)
19	DF	Sherzodbek Abdulboriev	20 June 2006 (aged 18)	(Uzbekistan Football Association)
21	GK	Ozodbek Marupov	21 March 2006 (aged 18)	(Uzbekistan Football Association)
22	MF	Murodali Usmonov	7 January 2005 (aged 19)	(Uzbekistan Football Association)
23	DF	Ozodbek Kurbonov	7 May 2003 (aged 21)	(Uzbekistan Football Association)

=== Iran ===
Iran announced a provisional squad of 23 players on 20 June 2024.

Head coach: Hossein Abdi

No.	Pos.	Player	Date of birth (age)	Club
1	GK	Arsha Shakouri	1 October 2006 (aged 17)	(Football Federation Islamic Republic of Iran)
2	DF	Nima Andarz	22 January 2006 (aged 18)	(Football Federation Islamic Republic of Iran)
3	DF	Hesam Nafari Nogourani	7 May 2006 (aged 18)	(Football Federation Islamic Republic of Iran)
4	DF	Alireza Homaeifard	14 January 2006 (aged 18)	(Football Federation Islamic Republic of Iran)
5	MF	Mehdi Mahdavi	30 September 2005 (aged 18)	(Football Federation Islamic Republic of Iran)
6	DF	Samir Hoboobati	4 February 2006 (aged 18)	(Football Federation Islamic Republic of Iran)
7	MF	Esmaeil Gholizadeh	18 February 2006 (aged 18)	(Football Federation Islamic Republic of Iran)
8	MF	Amirmohammad Razaghinia	11 April 2006 (aged 18)	(Football Federation Islamic Republic of Iran)
9	DF	Yaghoub Barage	26 January 2006 (aged 18)	
10	FW	Reza Ghandipour	13 January 2006 (aged 18)	(Football Federation Islamic Republic of Iran)
11	FW	Alireza Sharifi	20 March 2006 (aged 18)	(Football Federation Islamic Republic of Iran)
12	GK	Armin Abbasi	20 May 2006 (aged 18)	(Football Federation Islamic Republic of Iran)
13	DF	Ali Hassani	13 August 2006 (aged 17)	(Football Federation Islamic Republic of Iran)
14	MF	Mobin Dehghan	11 September 2005 (aged 18)	(Football Federation Islamic Republic of Iran)
15	MF	Farhan Bozorgian		(Football Federation Islamic Republic of Iran)
16	MF	Abolfazl Zamani	1 March 2006 (aged 18)	(Football Federation Islamic Republic of Iran)
17	FW	Sina Moazemitabar		(Football Federation Islamic Republic of Iran)
18	FW	Mahan Sadeghi	23 March 2006 (aged 18)	(Football Federation Islamic Republic of Iran)
19	DF	Abolfazl Zoleykhaei	9 March 2006 (aged 18)	(Football Federation Islamic Republic of Iran)
20	GK	Hamidreza Ghasemi	31 January 2005 (aged 19)	(Football Federation Islamic Republic of Iran)
21	FW	Mohammad Askari	7 February 2006 (aged 18)	(Football Federation Islamic Republic of Iran)
22	FW	Yousef Mazrae	13 June 2005 (aged 19)	(Football Federation Islamic Republic of Iran)

=== Turkmenistan ===
The final squad of 23 players was announced on 1 July 2024.

Head coach: Döwletmyrat Annaýew

No.	Pos.	Player	Date of birth (age)	Club
1	GK	Seýran Aşyrow	(aged 18)	(Football Federation of Turkmenistan) Ahal FK
2	DF	Ismail Kambarow	1 February 2005 (aged 19)	(Football Federation of Turkmenistan) FC Altyn Asyr
3	DF	Gurbangeldi Garajaýew		(Football Federation of Turkmenistan) Ahal FK
4	DF	Beglimuhammet Bekmyradow	9 August 2006 (aged 17)	(Football Federation of Turkmenistan) Ahal FK
5	MF	Ibraýym Amangeldiýew	(aged 18)	(Football Federation of Turkmenistan) Ahal FK
6		Hajymuhammet Orazow		(Football Federation of Turkmenistan) Köpetdag
7	DF	Eduard Sarkisýan	(aged 18)	(Football Federation of Turkmenistan) FK Arkadag
8	MF	Ýakupmuhammet Gowşudow	(aged 17)	(Football Federation of Turkmenistan) Ahal FK
9	FW	Gurbanmuhammet Esenow	13 January 2005 (aged 19)	(Football Federation of Turkmenistan) Ahal FK
10	FW	Magtymberdi Berenow	(aged 19)	(Football Federation of Turkmenistan) Nebitçi FT
11	FW	Yslam Annamyradow		(Football Federation of Turkmenistan) Ahal FK
12		Medet Gaýypnazarow		(Football Federation of Turkmenistan) Ahal FK
13		Maksat Ilmyradow		(Football Federation of Turkmenistan) Ahal FK
14	FW	Hangeldi Berdiýew	(aged 17)	(Football Federation of Turkmenistan) FK Arkadag
15	MF	Magtymguly Papyýew	(aged 18)	(Football Federation of Turkmenistan) FK Arkadag
16	GK	Dawut Dawatow		(Football Federation of Turkmenistan) FC Aşgabat
17	FW	Enwer Annaýew	(aged 17)	(Football Federation of Turkmenistan) FK Arkadag
18		Gurbanguly Garaýew		(Football Federation of Turkmenistan) Şagadam FK
19		Orazmyrat Nepesow		(Football Federation of Turkmenistan) FK Arkadag
20		Begenç Agajumaýew		(Football Federation of Turkmenistan) Ahal FK
21		Ali Zülfakar		(Uzbekistan Football Association) Navbahor
22		Mekan Muhammedow		(Football Federation of Turkmenistan) Ahal FK
23	GK	Ysmaýyl Gulow		(Football Federation of Turkmenistan) Energetik
