= Anton Zemlyanukhin =

Kyrgyzstani footballer

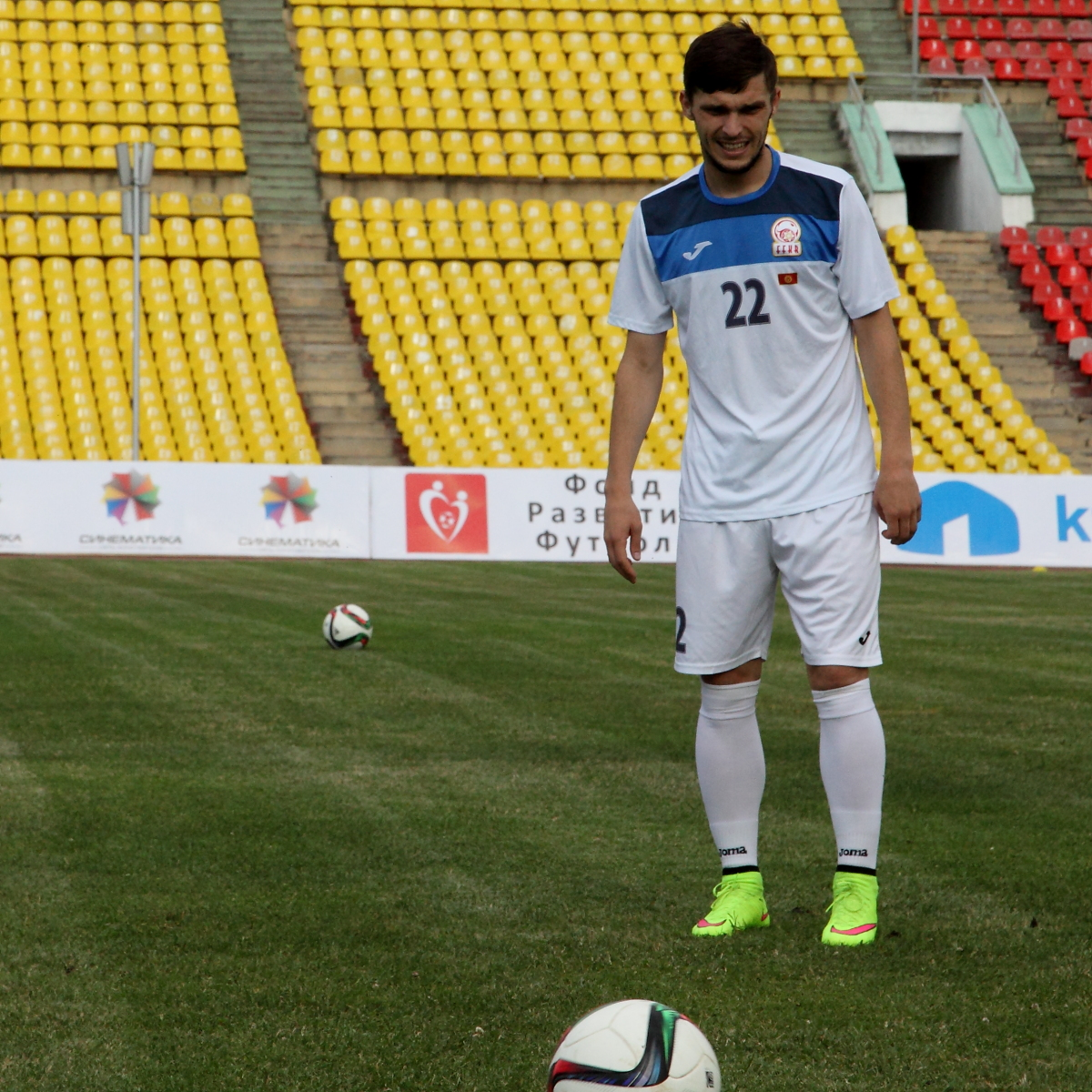

Personal information
- Full name: Anton Aleksandrovich Zemlyanukhin
- Date of birth: 11 December 1988 (age 37)
- Place of birth: Kant, Kyrgyz SSR, Soviet Union
- Height: 1.77 m (5 ft 9 1/2 in)
- Positions: Midfielder; forward

Team information
- Current team: Asiagoal Bishkek

Senior career*
Years	Team	Apps	(Gls)
2005–2006	Molodezhnaya Sbornaya (Note: Affiliated with the Kyrgyzstan U20 national team.)		(2)
2006	Muras-Sport Bishkek	11	(5)
2007	Abdish-Ata Kant	13	(6)
2007–2012	Giresunspor	32	(6)
2009	→ Abdish-Ata Kant (loan)	24	(6)
2010–2011	→ Taraz (loan)	34	(7)
2011	→ Abdish-Ata Kant (loan)	28	(7)
2012	→ Aktobe (loan)	10	(5)
2013	Aktobe	7	(1)
2013	Kairat	5	(1)
2014	Kaisar	21	(4)
2015	Radnički Niš	27	(5)
2016	Sisaket	23	(8)
2017	Sukhothai	11	(2)
2017	SKA-Khabarovsk	0	(0)
2018	Atyrau	4	(0)
2018	Ilbirs Bishkek	8	(3)
2018–2021	Dordoi Bishkek	7+	(5)
2021–2022	Alga Bishkek	31	(11)
2023–2024	Alga Bishkek	26	(11)
2024	Muras United	13	(2)
2025–2026	Bishkek City	6	(2)
2026–	Asiagoal Bishkek	0	(0)

International career^{‡}
2007–2023	Kyrgyzstan	31	(13)
- * Club domestic league appearances and goals as of 18:47, 6 February 2026 (UTC) ‡ National team caps and goals as of 10 June 2023

Anton Aleksandrovich Zemlyanukhin (Russian: Антон Александрович Землянухин; born 11 December 1988) is a Kyrgyzstani footballer who plays for Kyrgyz Premier League club Asiagoal Bishkek.

== Club career ==
He can play as striker, left winger, left midfielder or left-back.

Zemlyanukhin signed a five-year contract with TFF First League club Giresunspor at age 18 in August 2007, and he has gone out on loan to Abdish-Ata Kant and FC Taraz to seek more first team football.

Between 2010 and 2014 he played in the Kazakhstan Premier League with FC Taraz, FC Aktobe, FC Kairat and FC Kaisar.

On 13 February 2015, he signed a one-year contract with Serbian club FK Radnički Niš. His regular games in the Serbian championship and his goals at his return to the national team, made him receive the title of Kyrgyz player of the year for 2015.

On 5 November 2016, he officially transferred to Sukhothai after being released from Sisaket due to no offer for contract extension.

On 21 June 2017, Zemlyanukhin moved to the Russian Premier League, signing with a newly promoted club FC SKA-Khabarovsk. The contract was cancelled a short time later before he played any official games for the club due to him being injured at the time of the signing.

On 21 February 2018, FC Atyrau announced the signing of Zemlyanukhin.

On 5 December 2018, FC Dordoi Bishkek announced the signing of Zemlyanukhin alongside Pavel Matyash and Azamat Baymatov. On 16 January 2021, Dordoi Bishkek confirmed the departure of Zemlyanukhin after the expiation of his contract.

In March 2021, Zemlyanukhin signed for Alga Bishkek.

On 14 January 2025, Zemlyanukhin signed for Bishkek City.

== International career ==
As of 2018, Zemlyanukhin has made 30 appearances for the Kyrgyzstan national team, including participation in the 2009 Nehru Cup.

He has debuted in 2007, and after a pause he made in the national team, by joining Serbian side Radnički Niš, he returned to the national team and was part of the squad named for the friendly match against Afghanistan played on 26 March 2015.

In March 2015 he scored his first ever brace for the national team, in the opening 2018 World Cup qualification match against Bangladesh, in which his team subsequently won 3–1.

== Career statistics ==
=== International ===
Statistics accurate as of match played 10 June 2023

Kyrgyzstan
Year	Apps	Goals
2007	3	0
2008	0	0
2009	6	2
2010	3	1
2011	0	0
2012	0	0
2013	0	0
2014	0	0
2015	6	4
2016	2	0
2017	4	3
2018	3	3
2019	3	0
2023	1	0
Total	31	13

==== International goals ====
Scores and results list Kyrgyzstan's goal tally first.

No.	Date	Venue	Opponent	Score	Result	Competition	Ref.
1.	25 August 2009	Ambedkar Stadium, New Delhi, India	Lebanon	1–0	1–1	2009 Nehru Cup	
2.	28 August 2009	Ambedkar Stadium, New Delhi, India	Sri Lanka	1–0	4–1	2009 Nehru Cup	
3.	17 February 2010	Sugathadasa Stadium, Colombo, Sri Lanka	India	2–0	2–1	2010 AFC Challenge Cup	
4.	11 June 2015	Bangabandhu National Stadium Dhaka, Bangladesh	Bangladesh	1–0	3–1	2018 FIFA World Cup qualification	
5.	11 June 2015	Bangabandhu National Stadium Dhaka, Bangladesh	Bangladesh	3–1	3–1	2018 FIFA World Cup qualification	
6.	8 October 2015	Spartak Stadium, Bishkek, Kyrgyzstan	Tajikistan	2–2	2–2	2018 FIFA World Cup qualification	
7.	17 November 2015	Spartak Stadium, Bishkek, Kyrgyzstan	Jordan	1–0	1–0	2018 FIFA World Cup qualification	
8.	10 October 2017	Thuwunna Stadium, Yangon, Myanmar	Myanmar	1–0	2–2	2019 AFC Asian Cup qualification	
9.	14 November 2017	Estádio Campo Desportivo Taipa, Macau	Macau	1–0	4–3	2019 AFC Asian Cup qualification	
10.	14 November 2017	Estádio Campo Desportivo Taipa, Macau	Macau	3–0	4–3	2019 AFC Asian Cup qualification	
11.	22 March 2018	Incheon Football Stadium, Incheon, South Korea	Myanmar	2–0	5–1	2019 AFC Asian Cup qualification	
12.	22 March 2018	Incheon Football Stadium, Incheon, South Korea	Myanmar	3–0	5–1	2019 AFC Asian Cup qualification	
13.	27 March 2018	Spartak Stadium, Bishkek, Kyrgyzstan	India	1–0	2–1	2019 AFC Asian Cup qualification	

== Honours ==
=== Club ===
Abdish-Ata Kant

- Kyrgyzstan Cup: 2007, 2009, 2011

Aktobe

- Kazakhstan Premier League: 2013

Dordoi Bishkek

- Kyrgyz Premier League: 2019
- Kyrgyzstan Super Cup: 2019

Kyrgyzstan

- Aceh World Solidarity Cup: 2017

=== Individual ===
- Kyrgyz player of the year: 2015
- Aceh World Solidarity Cup: top score 2017
