= Mihail Titow =

Turkmenistani footballer

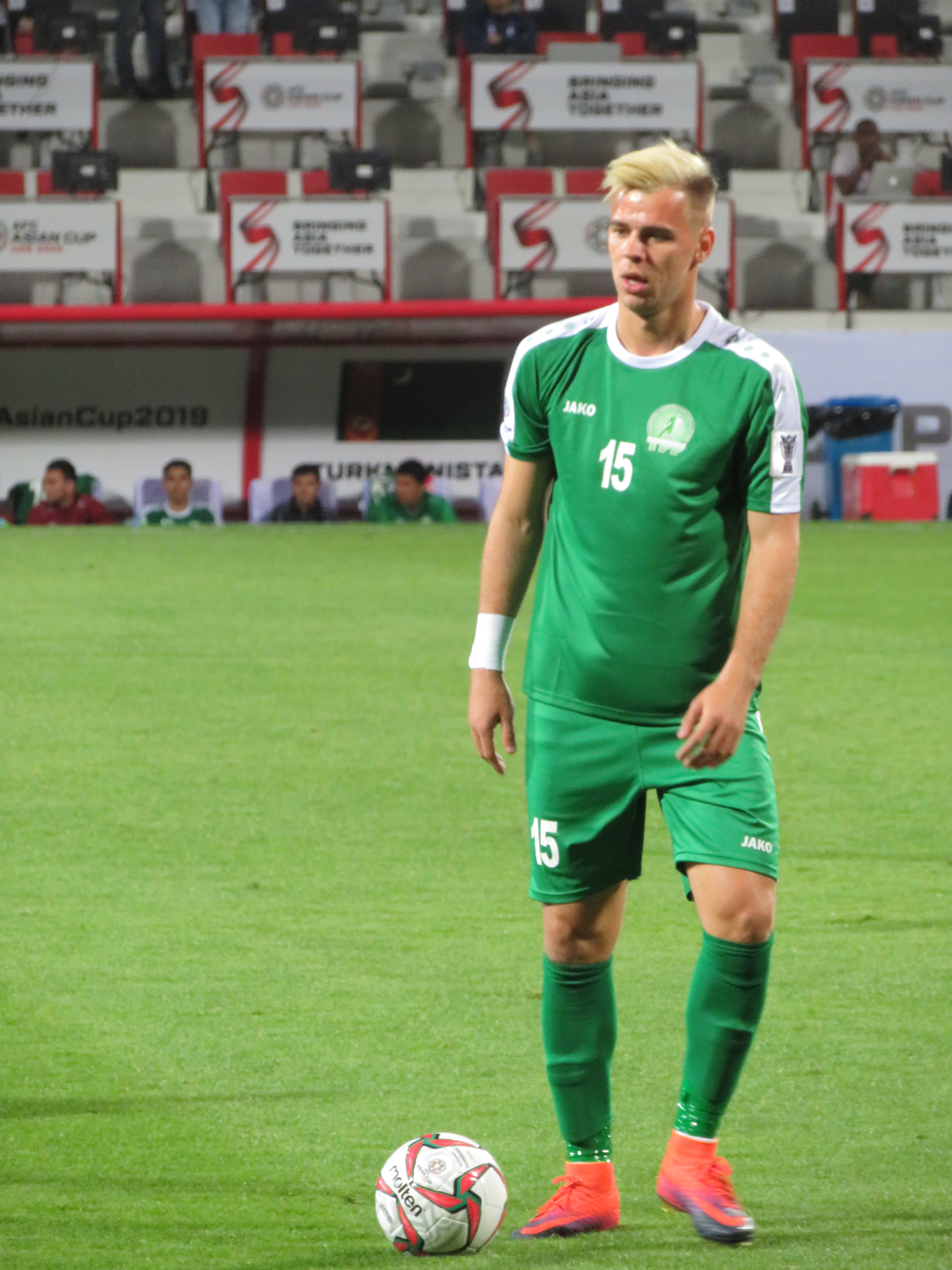
- Titov with Turkmenistan at the 2019 AFC Asian Cup

Personal information
- Date of birth: 18 October 1997 (age 29)
- Place of birth: Ashgabat, Turkmenistan
- Height: 1.88 m (6 ft 2 in)
- Position: Forward

Team information
- Current team: Ozgon
- Number: 29

Senior career*
Years	Team	Apps	(Gls)
2016–2017	Balkan	?	(?)
2017–2024	Altyn Asyr	?	(?)
2025–	Ozgon	24	(8)

International career^{‡}
2019–	Turkmenistan	10	(2)
- * Club domestic league appearances and goals ‡ National team caps and goals as of 10 June 2025

Mihail Titow (Russian: Михаил Титов; born 18 October 1997) is a Turkmenistani professional footballer who plays for Ozgon and Turkmenistan as forward.

== Club career ==
Prior to the start of the 2025 Kyrgyz Premier League season, Titow signed for newcomers Ozgon on a one-year contract.

== International career ==
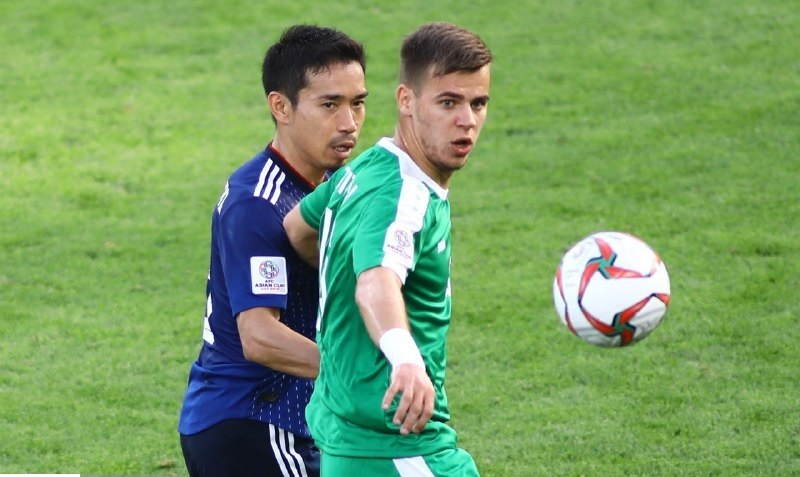
Titow with Yuto Nagatomo

Titow was included in Turkmenistan's squad for the 2019 AFC Asian Cup in the United Arab Emirates. He made his senior debut against Japan on 9 January 2019 at the group stage.

== Career statistics ==
=== International ===
Turkmenistan national team
Year	Apps	Goals
2019	7	1
2022	1	0
2025	2	1
Total	10	2

Statistics accurate as of match played 10 June 2025.

=== International goals ===
Scores and results list Turkmenistan's goal tally first.

No.	Date	Venue	Opponent	Score	Result	Competition
1.	14 November 2019	Köpetdag Stadium, Ashgabat, Turkmenistan	North Korea	1–0	3–1	2022 FIFA World Cup qualification
2.	10 June 2025	Ashgabat Stadium, Ashgabat, Turkmenistan	Thailand	1–0	3–1	2027 AFC Asian Cup qualification

== Personal life ==
Titow is an ethnic Russian.
