= Andrei Cojuhar =

Moldovan footballer

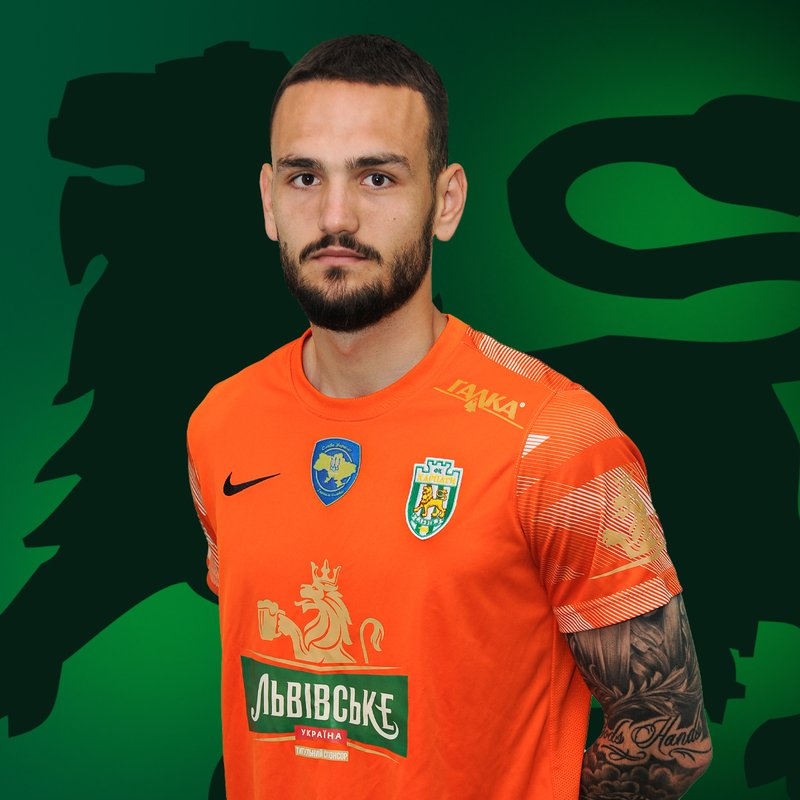
- Cojuhar with Karpaty Lviv in 2023

Personal information
- Full name: Andrei Yurievich Cojuhar
- Date of birth: 20 July 1999 (age 27)
- Place of birth: Chișinău, Moldova
- Height: 1.95 m (6 ft 5 in)
- Position: Goalkeeper

Team information
- Current team: Asia Talas (on loan from Veres Rivne)
- Number: 32

Youth career
- 2013–2018: Chornomorets Odesa

Senior career*
Years	Team	Apps	(Gls)
2018–2019	Chornomorets Odesa	23	(0)
2020–2021	Valmiera	3	(0)
2021–2023	Zemplín Michalovce	20	(0)
2023–2024	Karpaty Lviv	28	(0)
2024–	Veres Rivne	32	(0)
2026–	→ Asia Talas (loan)	0	(0)

International career^{‡}
2016–2017	Ukraine U18	3	(0)
2017–2018	Ukraine U19	2	(0)
2018–2019	Ukraine U21	4	(0)
2024–	Moldova	7	(0)
- * Club domestic league appearances and goals as of 26 July 2026 ‡ National team caps and goals as of 17 November 2026

Andrei Cojuhar (Ukrainian: Андрій Юрійович Кожухар, Andriy Kozhukhar; born 20 July 1999) is a Moldovan-Ukrainian professional footballer who plays as a goalkeeper for Kyrgyz Premier League club Asia Talas, on loan from Ukrainian Premier League club Veres Rivne. A former youth international for Ukraine, he plays for the Moldova national team.

== Club career ==
Born in Chișinău, Moldova, he has represented Ukraine at youth level.

He made his Ukrainian Premier League debut for Chornomorets Odesa on 10 November 2018 in a game against Desna Chernihiv. He is grateful Oleksandr Lavrentsov for trusting him with the position of a goalkeeper in the 2018–19 season. Until that date for few years Cojuhar played in the UPL junior championship U-19.

=== Club ===
Appearances and goals by club, season and competition
Club	Season	Tier	League		Cup		Europe		Super Cup		Total	
Club	Season	Tier	Apps	GA	Apps	GA	Apps	GA	Apps	GA	Apps	GA
Chornomorets Odesa	2018–19	1	8	14	—		—		—		8	14
Chornomorets Odesa	2019–20	2	15	21	—		—		—		15	21
Valmiera	2020	1	3	6	—		—		—		3	6
Zemplín Michalovce	2021–22	1	15	21	2	2	—		—		17	23
Zemplín Michalovce	2022–23	1	5	12	—		—		—		5	12
Karpaty Lviv	2023–24	2	7	2	—		—		—		7	2
Veres Rivne	2024–25	1	3									

== International career ==
Since 2016 Cojuhar played for the Ukraine national junior teams. In 2018–2019 he played for the Ukraine national under-21 football team.

On 10 September 2024 he made his debut for the Moldova national football team in a friendly against San Marino.
