= 2017 Aceh World Solidarity Tsunami Cup =

Tournament details
- Host country: Indonesia
- City: Banda Aceh
- Dates: 2–6 December 2017
- Teams: 4 (from 1 confederation)
- Venue: 1 (in 1 host city)

Final positions
- Champions: Kyrgyzstan
- Runners-up: Indonesia
- Third place: Mongolia
- Fourth place: Brunei

Tournament statistics
- Matches played: 5
- Goals scored: 17 (3.4 per match)
- Top scorer(s): (Kyrgyzstan) Anton Zemlianukhin (3 goals)
- Best player: (Kyrgyzstan) Askarbek Saliev

The 2017 Aceh World Solidarity Tsunami Cup (Indonesian: Piala Tsunami Solidariti Dunai Aceh) was an international association football championship held as a show of solidarity for the areas affected by the 2004 Indian Ocean earthquake and tsunami. It took place in Banda Aceh, Aceh, Indonesia from 2 to 6 December 2017 and was contested by the under-23 national teams of Brunei, Indonesia, Kyrgyzstan and Mongolia.

Played as a round-robin tournament, Kyrgyzstan were crowned champions of the competition after defeating Indonesia 1–0 in the final and ultimately decisive match.

The competition had been envisioned as an annual tournament but it was only played once.

== Background ==
On 26 December 2004, a M_{w} 9.2–9.3 earthquake, known as the Sumatra–Andaman earthquake, sturck in the Indian Ocean off the west coast of Aceh, in northern Sumatra, Indonesia. The earthquake and resulting tsunami was the deadliest natural disaster of the 21st century and caused more than 200,000 deaths.

In 2017, the Football Association of Indonesia organised a football tournament, the Aceh World Solidarity Tsunami Cup, to show of solidarity for the province of Aceh and to bring major events back to the city of Banda Aceh. Tournament organisers had thought that the competition could become a yearly event.

== Format ==
The four teams contested a single round robin group. After every team had played each other, the team with the most points would be the winner. The tournament was played to the same rules as the Summer Olympics. Teams were age-restricted to under-23 with a maximum of three overage players.

=== Participants ===
- Indonesia
- Brunei
- Kyrgyzstan
- Mongolia

== Venue ==
All matches were played at the Harapan Bangsa Stadium in Banda Aceh, Indonesia.

Banda Aceh	2017 Aceh World Solidarity Tsunami Cup (Aceh)
Harapan Bangsa Stadium	2017 Aceh World Solidarity Tsunami Cup (Aceh)

== Standings ==
Pos	Team	Pld	W	D	L	GF	GA	GD	Pts	Qualification
1	Kyrgyzstan	3	3	0	0	8	0	+8	9	Champion
2	Indonesia	3	2	0	1	7	3	+4	6	
3	Mongolia	2	0	0	2	2	6	−4	0	
4	Brunei	2	0	0	2	0	8	−8	0	

== Matches ==
2 December 2017
16:00

Kyrgyzstan	3–0	Mongolia
Zemlianukhin 14', 65'; Saarbekov 56'

Harapan Bangsa Stadium, Banda Aceh
Referee: Thoriq Alkatiri (Indonesia)
2 December 2017
21:30

Indonesia	4–0	Brunei
Hansamu 18'; Septian 25'; Fachrudin 69'; Yabes 89'

Harapan Bangsa Stadium, Banda Aceh
Referee: Oki Dwi Putra (Indonesia)

4 December 2017
16:00

Brunei	0–4	Kyrgyzstan
		Zemlianukhin 1'; Baymatov 32', 54' (pen.); Saarbekov 59'

Harapan Bangsa Stadium, Banda Aceh
Referee: Oki Dwi Putra (Indonesia)
4 December 2017
21:30

Mongolia	2–3	Indonesia
Tögöldör 38' (pen.), 58' (pen.)		Gavin 7'; Haay 25'; Spasojević 45+2' (pen.)

Harapan Bangsa Stadium, Banda Aceh
Referee: Thoriq Alkatiri (Indonesia)

6 December 2017
16:00

Kyrgyzstan	1–0	Indonesia
Saliev 20'

Harapan Bangsa Stadium, Banda Aceh
Referee: Mustafa Umarela (Indonesia)
6 December 2017
16:00

Mongolia	Cancelled	Brunei

Harapan Bangsa Stadium, Banda Aceh

== Goalscorers ==
There were 17 goals scored in 5 matches, for an average of 3.4 goals per match.

3 goals

- (Kyrgyzstan) Anton Zemlianukhin

2 goals

- (Kyrgyzstan) Azamat Baymatov
- (Kyrgyzstan) Kadybrek Saarbekov
- (Mongolia) Mönkh-Erdengiin Tögöldör

1 goal

- (Indonesia) Fachrudin Aryanto
- (Indonesia) Gavin Kwan Adsit
- (Indonesia) Hansamu Yama
- (Indonesia) Ilija Spasojević
- (Indonesia) Osvaldo Haay
- (Indonesia) Septian David
- (Indonesia) Yabes Roni
- (Kyrgyzstan) Askarbek Saliev
