= FC OshSU-Aldier =

Kyrgyzstani association football club

- Founded: 2022; 4 years ago
- Ground: Suyumbayev Stadion
- Capacity: 4,000
- League: Kyrgyz Higher League
- 2025: 6th
- Website: Website

Football Club State University-Aldier is an Kyrgyz association football club based in Osh that currently competes in the Kyrgyz Higher League.

== History ==
On 8 August 2022, it was announced that the Osh State University had purchased FC Aldiyer Kurshab. With the university’s financial support, the club would aim to be the first fully professional club in Kyrgyzstan. The club, which became the first in the country to represent a university, aimed for promotion to the Kyrgyz Premier League. In February 2023, the club announced that it would compete in the top flight for the 2023 season with a squad consisting of students from Kyrgyzstan and Uzbekistan. The club played its first league match on 2 April 2023, resulting in a 0–1 defeat to FC Alay.

== Seasons ==
Key

Champions Runners-up 3rd place

Season	League										Cup	Notes
Season	Div.	Pos.	Pl.	W	D	L	GF	GA	GD	Pts.	Cup	Notes
2023	I	9th	27	6	5	16	29	53	-24	23	Quarter-finals	
2024	I	7th	27	6	7	14	27	43	-16	25	Quarter-finals	
2025	I	6th	26	12	6	8	39	32	-7	42	Quarter-finals	
2026	I											
