= Nikola Borisov =

Bulgarian footballer (born 2000)

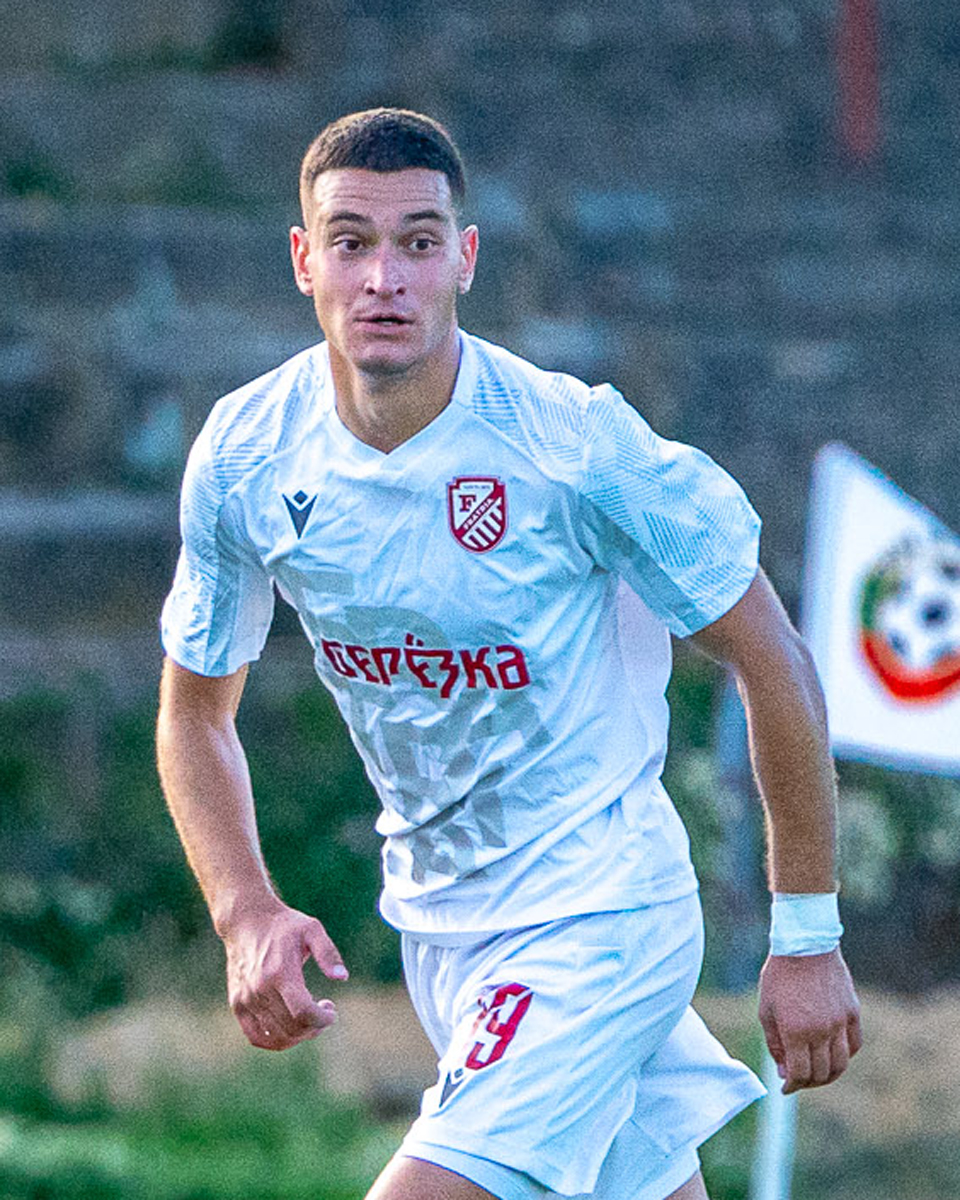
- Borisov while playing for Fratria in 2024.

Personal information
- Full name: Nikola Borislavov Borisov
- Date of birth: 21 November 2000 (age 25)
- Place of birth: Sofia, Bulgaria
- Height: 1.85 m (6 ft 1 in)
- Position: Defender

Team information
- Current team: Asiagoal Bishkek
- Number: 21

Youth career
- 2007–2017: CSKA Sofia

Senior career*
Years	Team	Apps	(Gls)
2017	CSKA Sofia II	5	(0)
2017–2020	CSKA Sofia	0	(0)
2019	→ Litex Lovech (loan)	6	(0)
2020	→ Neftochimic Burgas (loan)	10	(0)
2021	Nadezhda Dobroslavtsi	15	(2)
2021–2023	Spartak Varna	47	(2)
2023	→ Dunav Ruse (loan)	5	(0)
2023–2024	Fratria	22	(2)
2024–2025	CSKA Sofia II	23	(2)
2025	Marek Dupnitsa	0	(0)
2025–2026	Sevlievo	9	(1)
2026–	Asiagoal Bishkek	2	(0)

International career^{‡}
2017–2018	Bulgaria U18	1	(1)
2017–2018	Bulgaria U19	7	(0)
- * Club domestic league appearances and goals as of 00:38, 14 March 2026 (UTC) ‡ National team caps and goals as of 10:55, 24 September 2022 (UTC)

Nikola Borisov (Bulgarian: Никола Борисов; born 21 November 2000) is a Bulgarian professional footballer who plays as a defender for Kyrgyz Premier League club Asiagoal Bishkek.

== Career ==
Borisov started his career in the local CSKA Sofia Academy aged seven. In 2018 he was called up for the first team, after his good season with U19 team and the second team. In 2019 he was sent on loan to Litex Lovech and Neftochimic Burgas, before being released in 2021 and join the amateur team Nadezhda Dobroslavtsi.

In July 2021 Borisov joined the returned to Second League team of Spartak Varna, establishing himself in the starting team and helping the team to secure his return to First League. Borisov scored his debut top league goal on 20 August 2022 in a league defeat against Arda Kardzhali.

On 1 November 2023, Borisov signed with the ambitious team of Fratria, playing in Third League.

== Career statistics ==
=== Club ===
As of 6 September 2025

Club performance			League		Cup		Continental		Other		Total	
Club	League	Season	Apps	Goals	Apps	Goals	Apps	Goals	Apps	Goals	Apps	Goals
Bulgaria			League		Bulgarian Cup		Europe		Other (Note: Includes Bulgarian Supercup matches.)		Total	
CSKA Sofia II	Second League	2016–17	5	0	–		–		–		5	0
CSKA Sofia	First League	2017–18	0	0	0	0	—		—		0	0
Litex Lovech (loan)	Second League	2018–19	5	0	0	0	—		—		5	0
Litex Lovech (loan)	Second League	2019–20	1	0	0	0	—		—		1	0
Litex Lovech (loan)	Total		6	0	0	0	0	0	0	0	6	0
Neftochimic Burgas (loan)	Second League	2020–21	10	0	0	0	—		—		10	0
Nadezhda Dobroslavtsi	Third League	2020–21	4	2	0	0	–		–		4	2
Spartak Varna	Second League	2021–22	29	1	1	0	–		–		30	1
Spartak Varna	First League	2022–23	18	1	2	0	–		–		20	1
Spartak Varna	Total		47	2	3	0	0	0	0	0	50	2
Dunav Ruse (loan)	Second League	2022–23	5	0	0	0	—		—		5	0
Fratria	Third League	2023–24	17	2	0	0	–		–		17	2
Fratria	Second League	2024–25	5	0	0	0	–		–		5	0
Fratria	Total		22	2	0	0	0	0	0	0	22	2
CSKA Sofia II	Second League	2024–25	22	2	–		–		–		22	2
Marek Dupnitsa	Second League	2025–26	0	0	0	0	–		–		0	0
Sevlievo	Second League	2025–26	1	0	0	0	–		–		1	0
Career statistics			122	8	3	0	0	0	0	0	125	8
