= Aziz Sydykov =

Kyrgyzstani footballer

Personal information
- Full name: Aziz Mukhamedovich Sydykov
- Date of birth: 23 June 1992 (age 34)
- Place of birth: Bishkek, Kyrgyzstan
- Height: 1.70 m (5 ft 7 in)
- Position: Midfielder

Team information
- Current team: Asiagoal Bishkek
- Number: 8

Senior career*
Years	Team	Apps	(Gls)
2011	Alga Bishkek	16	(3)
2011–2015	Abdish-Ata Kant	44	(7)
2015–2022	Dordoi Bishkek	51	(6)
2019	→ Sanat Naft Abadan (loan)	4	(0)
2022–2024	Alay	37	(2)
2024	Alga Bishkek		

International career
2011–	Kyrgyzstan	27	(1)
- * Club domestic league appearances and goals

Aziz Mukhamedovich Sydykov (Russian: Азиз Мухамедович Сыдыков; born 23 June 1992) is a Kyrgyzstani professional footballer who plays for Asiagoal Bishkek as a midfielder. He is a member of the Kyrgyzstan national football team.

== Career ==
=== Club ===
On 31 January 2019, Dordoi Bishkek announced that Sydykov had left the club to join Sanat Naft Abadan on loan until the end of the 2018–19 Persian Gulf Pro League season.

=== International ===
Sydykov is a member of the Kyrgyzstan national football team.

== Career statistics ==
=== International ===
Kyrgyzstan national team
Year	Apps	Goals
2011	5	1
2012	0	0
2013	4	0
2014	6	0
2015	2	0
2016	2	0
2017	1	0
2018	4	0
2019	4	0
Total	28	1

Statistics accurate as of match played 8 October 2015

=== International Goals ===
#	Date	Venue	Opponent	Score	Result	Competition	Ref
1.	25 March 2011	Rasmee Dhandu Stadium, Malé, Maldives	Cambodia	1–0	4–3	2012 AFC Challenge Cup qualification	
