= FC Toktogul =

Kyrgyzstani association football club

- Founded: 2010; 16 years ago
- Ground: Ergesh Ormonov Stadium
- Capacity: 3,450
- League: Kyrgyz Higher League
- Website: Website

FC Toktogul is an Kyrgyz association football club based in Toktogul that currently competes in the Kyrgyz Higher League.

== Stadium ==
The club plays its home matches at the Ergesh Ormonov Stadium. Originally built in 1980, the venue underwent a complete reconstruction in 2024. The first match at the new stadium after was played between FC Toktogul and FC Bazar-Korgon-Babur following the opening ceremony on 14 September 2025. Toktogul won the match 10-0.

== History ==
FC Toktogul was founded in 2010. In October 2025, it competed in a two-leg series against fellow Second Level club FC Umut to determine who would compete in the Kyrgyz Premier League for the 2026 season. Toktogul won the series 10–1 on aggregate and were promoted. In preparation for its debut season in the top flight, the club signed several experienced players including Eldar Moldozhunusov, Mirbek Akhmataliyev, and Georgian international Solomon Kvirkvelia.

== Seasons ==
Key

Champions Runners-up 3rd place

Season	League										Cup	Notes
Season	Div.	Pos.	Pl.	W	D	L	GF	GA	GD	Pts.	Cup	Notes
2026	I											
