= Valon Ahmedi =

Albanian footballer (born 1994)

Personal information
- Date of birth: 7 October 1994 (age 32)
- Place of birth: Ohrid, Macedonia
- Height: 1.75 m (5 ft 9 in)
- Position: Attacking midfielder

Team information
- Current team: Bishkek City
- Number: 9

Youth career
- 2004–2011: Kastelbell
- 2011–2012: Südtirol

Senior career*
Years	Team	Apps	(Gls)
2012–2014	Südtirol	6	(0)
2014–2015	Celje	34	(5)
2016–2018	Maribor	22	(1)
2016–2017	Maribor B	14	(6)
2018–2019	Ironi Kiryat Shmona	20	(1)
2019	Inter Zaprešić	5	(0)
2020	Shkëndija	17	(4)
2021–2024	Shakhtyor Soligorsk	82	(10)
2024–2025	Shkëndija	13	(1)
2025	Rabotnichki	5	(0)
2025	Neman Grodno	5	(1)
2026–	Bishkek City	2	(0)

International career
2012	Albania U19 (Note: Official competitive UEFA matches only.)	3	(0)
2013	Albania U20	5	(0)
2013–2014	Albania U21	2	(0)
2017	Albania	2	(0)
- * Club domestic league appearances and goals as of 13 March 2026

Valon Ahmedi (born 7 October 1994) is a professional footballer who plays as an attacking midfielder for Kyrgyz club Bishkek City. Born in the Republic of Macedonia, he represented the Albania national team.

== Club career ==
=== Early career ===
Ahmedi was born in Ohrid, Republic of Macedonia, to ethnic Albanian parents and was raised in Castellanza, Italy. He began his career with Kastelbell. He moved to F.C. Südtirol in August 2011 after being spotted by the club's scout and was offered a place in the youth team.

He made his senior debut for Südtirol on 22 December 2012 against Tritium during the 2012–13 season, coming on as an 89th-minute substitute for Alessandro Campo in the 1–1 draw. His next and last senior appearance of the 2012–13 season came on 13 January 2013 against Pavia in a 2–1 loss, where he came on in the 67th minute of the game in place of Alessandro Furlan.

In the 2013–14 season he played overall 4 matches all as a substitute.

=== Celje ===
In July 2014 Ahmedi signed with Slovenian PrvaLiga side NK Celje. He made his debut in the opening match of the 2014–15 season against Zavrč playing the full 90-minutes. He was considered as an important player for the team and regularly played for entire matches, and on 1 August 2014 he scored his first goal against Krka in the third round, helping his team to a 3–0 victory. Ahmed had a three months break as he got injured in the start of the 2015 and missed out for two months until May 2015.

He finished his first season at Celje with 20 league appearances, scoring five goals. Celje finished as league runners-up and this made them to secure a place in the 2015–16 UEFA Europa League qualifiers. Ahmedi also played five matches in the 2014–15 Slovenian Football Cup and scored one goal, as Celje finished runners-up losing to the final against Koper.

He made his European debut on 2 July 2015 in the 2015–16 UEFA Europa League First qualifying round against Śląsk Wrocław, where he played for 45 minutes before being substituted at the half-time for Sunny Omoregie. In the second leg on 9 July, Ahmedi started from the bench and came in to play in the 79th minute in place of Danijel Miškić. The match ended in a 3–1 loss and it resulted in elimination of Celje 4–1 on aggregate.

=== Maribor ===
He signed for Slovenian champions NK Maribor in January 2016. He debuted on 20 April 2016 in the 2015–16 Slovenian Cup semi-final game against Zavrč, replacing Dare Vršič in the 64th minute. Maribor won the game 5–1 after extra time and secured a place in the final. Ahmedi scored his first goal for Maribor on 22 September 2017 in the 2017–18 Slovenian PrvaLiga 10th matchday against Aluminij, helping his team to win the match 3–2.

== International career ==
Ahmedi was eligible to represent Macedonia through birthplace, Italy through residence, and Albania through his ethnicity.

=== Albania under-19 ===
He caught the attention of the Albanian Football Association in 2012 with his performances in the youth team of Südtirol, and he accepted their invitation to the join Albania U19s for a friendly against Bosnia and Herzegovina U19 on 8 May 2012, which he featured in from the start as a striker in the 3–1 win. Then, Ahmedi was called up against in August 2012 to participate with Albania U19 in a friendly tournament in Slovenia.

Ahmedi was named in the Foto Strakosha squad for the 2013 UEFA European Under-19 Championship qualification from 12 to 17 October 2012 with opponents Italy U19, Belgium U19 and Belarus U19. In the opening match of the tournament on 12 October 2012 against Italy U19, he made it his debut by playing as a starter and got substituted off in the 81st minute for Dardan Vuthaj in a 3–0 loss. In the second match against Belgium U19 he was included in the starting line-up and played for 84 minutes as Albania U19 made a crucial 3–1 victory. In the closing match against Belarus, Ahmedi managed to play the full 90 minutes but was unable to avoid a 2–0 loss which resulted in elimination for Albania U19, which finished in the last place in their group.

=== Albania under-20 ===
Ahmedi was called up at Albania national under-20 football team by coach Skënder Gega to participate in the 2013 Mediterranean Games football tournament which began on 19 June 2013 in Mersin, Turkey. Ahmedi played in all five Albania U20s matches, in which one of them was a full 90-minutes game, two as a starter until second half, and two others as a substitute. Albania U20 was ranked in the last place out of eight teams.

=== Albania under-21 ===
Following impressive performances in the under-19s national team as well as his club Südtirol, Ahmedi received his first call up for the Albanian under-21 national team by coach Skënder Gega for a friendly against Macedonia U21 on 6 February 2013. He debuted for the under-21 side against Macedonia U21, playing as a starter for the entire first half in an eventual goalless draw. He received another call up for the under-21 side by same coach Skënder Gega for the friendly match against Romania U21 on 8 October 2014. He played against Romania U21 as a starter and in the 60th minute provided the assist for the 1–1 equalising goal scored by Vedat Muriqi, which however wasn't enough as Romania U21 won 3–1.

Ahmedi was called up for the first time in an official competitive match by the coach Skënder Gega for the 2017 UEFA European Under-21 Championship qualification opening match against Liechtenstein on 28 March 2015, but he withdrew due to a lately injury at Celje.

=== Albania senior side ===
Following his good form at Maribor in the 2017–18 UEFA Champions League, progressing and qualifying for the group stage, he received his first call for the Albania senior team by newly appointed coach Christian Panucci for the 2018 FIFA World Cup qualification matches against Liechtenstein and Macedonia (which he announced to have refused only to play for Albania) on 2 and 5 September 2017, respectively.

== Personal life ==
Ahmedi speaks Albanian as a mother tongue, Italian, German, English, Croatian, and Slovenian.

== Career statistics ==
=== Club ===
As of 4 January 2020

Appearances and goals by club, season and competition
Club	Season	League			National cup		Continental		Total	
Club	Season	Division	Apps	Goals	Apps	Goals	Apps	Goals	Apps	Goals
Südtirol	2012–13	Lega Pro	2	0	—		—		2	0
Südtirol	2013–14	Lega Pro	4	0	0	0	—		4	0
Südtirol	Total		6	0	0	0	—		6	0
Celje	2014–15	Slovenian PrvaLiga	20	5	5	1	—		25	6
Celje	2015–16	Slovenian PrvaLiga	14	0	1	0	2 (Note: Appearance(s) in UEFA Europa League)	0	17	0
Celje	Total		34	5	6	1	2	0	42	6
Maribor	2015–16	Slovenian PrvaLiga	1	0	1	0	—		2	0
Maribor	2016–17	Slovenian PrvaLiga	5	0	0	0	0	0	5	0
Maribor	2017–18	Slovenian PrvaLiga	16	1	1	0	10 (Note: Appearance(s) in UEFA Champions League)	0	27	1
Maribor	2018–19	Slovenian PrvaLiga	0	0	1	0	0	0	1	0
Maribor	Total		22	1	3	0	10	0	35	1
Ironi Kiryat Shmona	2018–19	Israeli Premier League	20	1	1	0	—		21	1
Inter Zaprešić	2019–20	Prva HNL	5	0	1	0	—		6	0
Career total			87	7	11	1	12	0	110	8

=== International ===
Appearances and goals by national team and year
National team	Year	Apps	Goals
Albania	2017	2	0
Total		2	0

== Honours ==
Maribor

- Slovenian Championship: 2016–17
- Slovenian Cup: 2015–16
