= Ilya Karpuk =

Russian football player

Personal information
- Full name: Ilya Sergeyevich Karpuk
- Date of birth: 7 August 1997 (age 29)
- Place of birth: Krasnoyarsk, Russia
- Height: 1.86 m (6 ft 1 in)
- Position: Forward

Team information
- Current team: Ilbirs Bishkek FC
- Number: 20

Youth career
- –2014: PRZ Krasnoyarsk
- 2015–2017: FC Yenisey Krasnoyarsk

Senior career*
Years	Team	Apps	(Gls)
2017–2018	FC Yenisey Krasnoyarsk	0	(0)
2018–2019	FC Ryazan	11	(0)
2019–2020	FC Lada Dimitrovgrad	17	(6)
2020–2022	FC Yenisey Krasnoyarsk	8	(0)
2020	→ FC Volga Ulyanovsk (loan)	13	(4)
2021–2022	→ FC Zvezda Perm (loan)	27	(11)
2022–2023	FC Tekstilshchik Ivanovo	28	(13)
2023	FC Chelyabinsk	9	(0)
2023–2024	FC Irtysh Omsk	20	(1)
2024–2025	FC Veles Moscow	29	(5)
2025–2026	FC Ufa	11	(1)
2026–	Ilbirs Bishkek FC	0	(0)
- * Club domestic league appearances and goals as of 8 March 2026

Ilya Sergeyevich Karpuk (Russian: Илья Сергеевич Карпук; born 7 August 1997) is a Russian football player, who plays for Kyrgyz Premier League club Ilbirs Bishkek.

== Club career ==
He made his debut in the Russian Football National League for FC Yenisey Krasnoyarsk on 27 February 2021 in a game against FC Volgar Astrakhan.
