= Giovanni Costantino =

Italian football manager (born 1984)

Personal information
- Date of birth: 3 October 1984 (age 42)
- Place of birth: Messina, Italy

Team information
- Current team: Bishkek City (head coach)

Managerial career
- Years: Team
- 2013–2016: Futura (youth)
- 2016–2017: Budapest Honvéd (assistant)
- 2017–2018: DAC Dunajská Streda (assistant)
- 2018–2021: Hungary (assistant)
- 2021: MTK Budapest
- 2022–2023: Casarano
- 2023: Ayia Napa
- 2023–2024: FC U Craiova
- 2024–2025: Petrocub Hîncești
- 2025–: Bishkek City

Giovanni Costantino (born 3 October 1984) is an Italian football manager who is currently in charge of Kyrgyz Premier League club Bishkek City.

== Life and career ==
Costantino was born on 3 October 1984 in Messina, Italy. He started his managerial career at the age of twenty-six. He obtained a UEFA Pro License at the age of 35.

In 2013, Costantino was appointed as a youth manager of Finnish club FC Futura. He managed the club's teams from under-12 to under-17 level. In 2016, he was appointed in the staff of the first team of Hungarian club Honvéd. He helped the club win the league. In 2017, he was appointed as assistant manager of Slovak club DAC. He helped the club achieve third place in the league.

In 2018, he was appointed as an assistant manager of the Hungary national football team. He helped the team achieve qualification for UEFA Euro 2020 and double promotion from Nations League C to Nations League A. In 2021, he was appointed manager of Hungarian club MTK. In 2022, he was appointed manager of Italian club Casarano. In 2023, he was appointed manager of Cypriot club Ayia Napa. After some matches he left the club due the appointment as manager of Romanian club FCU Craiova.
