= FC Bishkek City =

Kyrgyz football club

Bishkek City
- Full name: Football Club Bishkek City
- Short name: FKBC
- Founded: 2025; 1 year ago
- Ground: Dolen Omurzakov Stadium
- Capacity: 23,000
- Manager: Giovanni Costantino
- League: Kyrgyz Premier League
- 2025: 13th of 14
Home colours	Away colours

FC Bishkek City (Kyrgyz: ФК Бишкек-Сити) is a Kyrgyz professional football club from the capital Bishkek. The club currently competes in the Kyrgyz Premier League.

== History ==
At the Kyrgyz Football Union general meeting on 20 December 2024, FC Bishkek City was one of four newly-created clubs accepted into the 2025 season, as the league expanded to fourteen clubs. Brazilian Mavi Lopes was named the club's first manager.

On 29 May 2025, Giovanni Costantino was announced as the new Head Coach of Bishkek City.

== Current squad ==
As of 2 April, 2026

Note: Flags indicate national team as defined under FIFA eligibility rules; some limited exceptions apply. Players may hold more than one non-FIFA nationality.

No.	Pos.	Nation	Player
1	GK	KGZ	Artem Pryadkin
3	DF	KGZ	Ulanbek Sultanbekov
5	DF	UZB	Timur Nabiev
7	MF	KGZ	Nurislam Oruntaev
8	MF	KGZ	Adilet Kanybekov
9	MF	ALB	Valon Ahmedi
10	FW	KGZ	Argen Emilbekov
11	FW	RUS	Yevgeni Kozlov
12	DF	KGZ	Esenbek Uson uulu
13	GK	KGZ	Adilet Ymanbekov
14	FW	UZB	Ruslan Roziev
15	MF	KGZ	Iskak Zamirbekov

No.	Pos.	Nation	Player
17	FW	KGZ	Bayastan Bokonov
18	DF	RUS	Vladislav Mikushin
20	DF	GER	Flodyn Baloki
21	MF	KGZ	Islam Mezhitov
23	DF	KGZ	Azamat Askerbekov
27	MF	KGZ	Elmirbek Kuvanychbekov
31	GK	KGZ	Alexander Shapkarin
39	FW	KGZ	Eldar Zholdoshbekov
40	FW	KGZ	Samat Kudaybergenov
55	MF	UKR	Oleksiy Lobov
66	DF	RUS	Igor Gubanov
77	MF	KGZ	Atay Ilichbek Uulu
99	DF	UKR	Mykyta Peterman

== Managerial history ==
Only competitive matches are counted.

Name	Nat.	From	To	P	W	D	L	GS	GA	%W	Honours	Notes
Mavi Lopes	Brazil	9 January 2025		1	1	0	0	3	1	100.00		

== Seasonal record ==
Key

Champions Runners-up 3rd place

Season	League										Cup	Notes
Season	Div.	Pos.	Pl.	W	D	L	GF	GA	GD	Pts.	Cup	Notes
2025	1st	13th	26	5	4	17	26	48	-22	19	Semi-finals	
2026	1st											
