= Ivan Kurtušić =

Serbian footballer

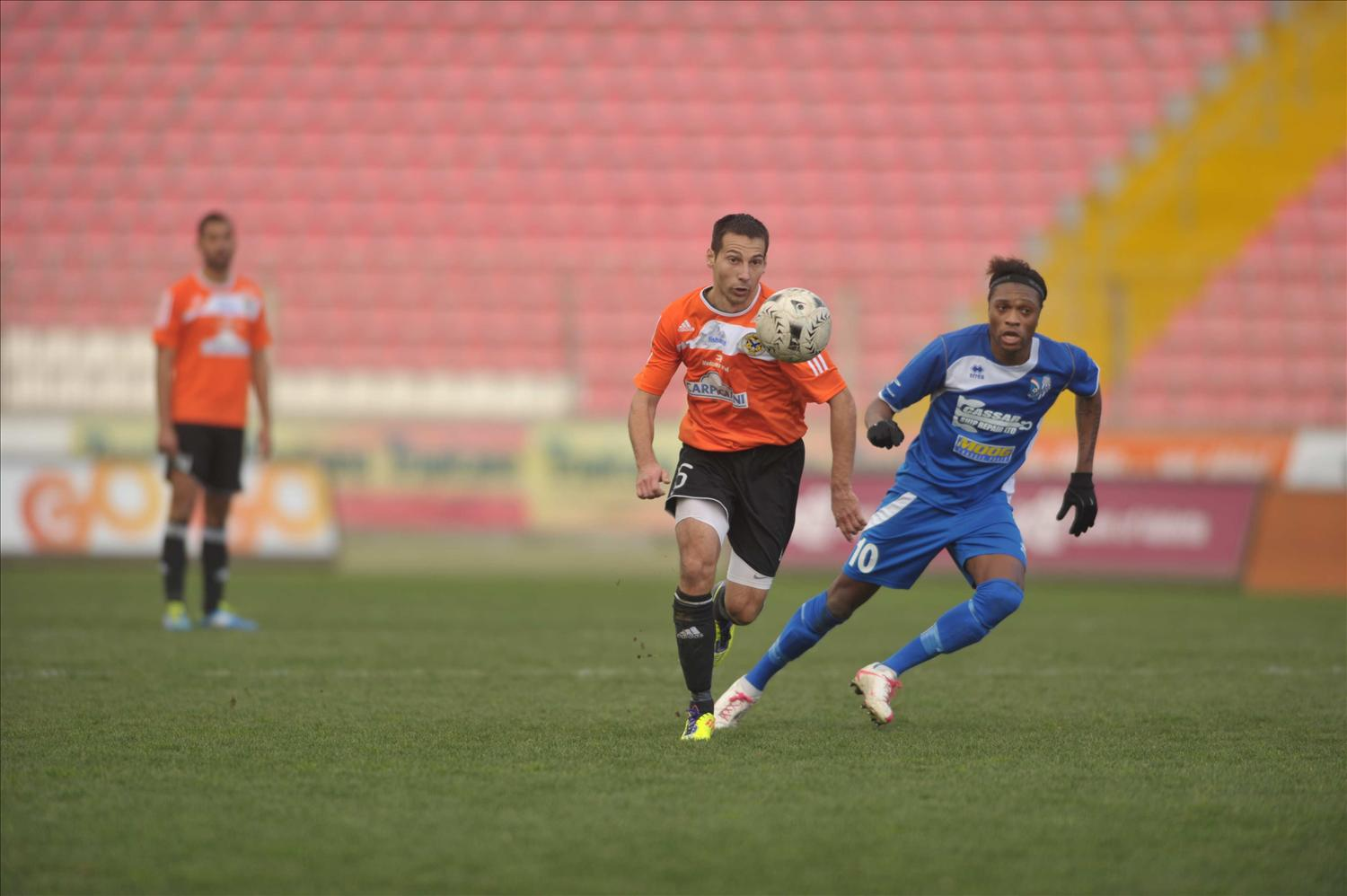
- Kurtušić in action for Marsaxlokk in 2012

Personal information
- Date of birth: 28 April 1984 (age 42)
- Place of birth: Belgrade, SFR Yugoslavia
- Height: 1.85 m (6 ft 1 in)
- Position: Central midfielder

Youth career
- Red Star Belgrade
- Vojvodina
- Sartid Smederevo

Senior career*
Years	Team	Apps	(Gls)
2005	Dinamo Pančevo		
2006	Vlasina	6	(0)
2007	Obilić	15	(0)
2008	Pobeda		
2009	OFK Kikinda	6	(0)
2010	Obilić		
2010	Sinđelić Niš	10	(3)
2011	Mladenovac		
2012	Marsaxlokk	2	(0)
2012	Gudja United	9	(4)
2013	Żejtun Corinthians	5	(0)
2013	Manama Club		
2014	Sheikh Russell		
2015	Sloga Kraljevo	9	(0)
2016–2017	Eastern District	17	(3)
2017–2019	Wong Tai Sin	21	(2)

Managerial career
- 2016–2017: Eastern District
- 2017–2019: Wong Tai Sin
- 2020: Tai Po
- 2021–2022: Marsonia
- 2022–2023: Mačva Šabac
- 2024: Voždovac
- * Club domestic league appearances and goals

Ivan Kurtušić (Serbian Cyrillic: Иван Куртушић, born 28 April 1984) is a Serbian retired footballer who most recently was the manager of Serbian First League club Voždovac.

== Playing career ==
Born in Belgrade, SR Serbia, he started to play football with Red Star Belgrade. In 2001 Kurtušić moved to FK Vojvodina. In 2002 Kurtušić made his first professional contract with FK Sartid Smederevo when he was only 17 years old.

Next season, he played for FK Vlasina and FK Obilić in the Serbian First League. In summer 2008, he moved to FK Pobeda of the Macedonian First Football League. After his spell in Macedonia, Kurtušić returned to Serbia and during the following seasons he represented a number of clubs, namely OFK Kikinda, FK Obilić, FK Sinđelić Niš and Mladenovac.

During the winter break of the 2011–12 season, he moved abroad again, this time signing with Maltese Premier League team Marsaxlokk. In the 2012–13 season he signed with Gudja United. He scored 4 goals in 9 games for the team and that was the perfect recommendation for the famous Maltese club Żejtun Corinthians to take him and sign him to the end of the 2012–13 season. He helped the club to stay in the league that season playing 5 games for them.

His next career move was signing a contract with Bahraini Premier League team Manama Club on a one-year deal. In 2014, he got an offer and signed a contract until the end of the season for Sheikh Russel KC in the Bangladesh Premier League, last year's champion team. With his new team he was part of the history of football in Bangladesh as a member of the squad in the AFC President's Cup, where the Bangladesh team reached the final round of this competition for the first time ever. In summer 2016, he signed for Hong Kong First Division club Eastern District.

== Coaching career ==
In 2020, Kurtušić was appointed a first-team coach of Hong Kong Premier League defending champions Tai Po. The club started a six-game unbeaten streak, breaking into the semi-finals of the Hong Kong FA Cup.
