= Asiagoal Bishkek =

Kyrgyz football club

- Full name: Football Club Asiagoal Bishkek
- Short name: AGB
- Founded: December 2024; 1 year ago
- Ground: Dolen Omurzakov Stadium, Bishkek
- Capacity: 23,000
- Manager: Islam Akhmedov
- League: Kyrgyz Premier League
- 2025: 14th of 14 (Relegated)
Home colours	Away colours

Asiagoal Bishkek (Kyrgyz: Футбольный Клуб Азиягол) is a Kyrgyz professional football club from Bishkek. The club currently competes in the Kyrgyz Premier League.

The club plays its home games at the Dölön Ömürsakov Stadium in Bishkek. The stadium has a capacity of 23,000. Its women's section acquired Sdyushor СI Alga and got renamed to Sdyushor SI–Asiagoal in 2025. It plays in the Kyrgyzstan Women's League and took part in the AFC Women's Champions League.

== History ==
In December 2024, the Kyrgyz Football Union announced that Asiagoal and three other new clubs had been accepted into the Kyrgyz Premier League.

== Current squad ==
As of 2 April, 2026

Note: Flags indicate national team as defined under FIFA eligibility rules; some limited exceptions apply. Players may hold more than one non-FIFA nationality.

No.	Pos.	Nation	Player
1	GK	KGZ	Dastan Alybekov
2	DF	KGZ	Mustafa Yusupov
3	DF	KGZ	Maksat Dzhakybaliev
5	DF	KGZ	Adilet Nurlan uulu
6	MF	SRB	Nemanja Kruševac
7	FW	KGZ	Ryskeldi Artykbayev
8	MF	KGZ	Aziz Sydykov
9	FW	KGZ	Raul Dzhalilov
10	FW	RUS	Nikolai Prudnikov
11	FW	KGZ	Temirbolot Tapayev
13	GK	KGZ	Kutman Kadyrbekov
14	MF	KGZ	Bektur Talgat Uulu
15	DF	LTU	Karolis Šilkaitis
16	GK	KGZ	Azamat Sagynbekov

No.	Pos.	Nation	Player
17	FW	KGZ	Jenishbek Jetigenov
18	DF	BLR	Aleksandr Mikhalenko
19	DF	MDA	Vladimir Ghinaitis
20	FW	KGZ	Marlen Murzakhmatov
21	DF	BUL	Nikola Borisov
22	MF	KGZ	Anton Zemlyanukhin
27	FW	KGZ	Almazbek Myrzaev
31	GK	RUS	Daniil Polyansky
44	DF	RUS	Murad Gadzhimagomedov
67	MF	KGZ	Arsen Sharshenbekov
87	DF	KGZ	Sultanbek Bakytbek Uulu
92	MF	RUS	Dmitriy Ostrovskiy
95	FW	RUS	Aleks Radzhabov
99	GK	KGZ	Bayzak Bektur uulu
