= Nazar Vyzdryk =

Ukrainian footballer

Personal information
- Full name: Nazar Tarasovych Vyzdryk
- Date of birth: 27 April 1996 (age 30)
- Place of birth: Lviv, Ukraine
- Height: 1.77 m (5 ft 10 in)
- Position: Defender

Team information
- Current team: Ilbirs Bishkek
- Number: 29

Youth career
- 2010–2011: Youth Sportive School #4 Lviv
- 2011–2013: Karpaty Lviv

Senior career*
Years	Team	Apps	(Gls)
2013–2018	Karpaty Lviv	1	(0)
2018	Zirka Kropyvnytskyi	8	(0)
2019–2020	Nyva Vinnytsia	19	(0)
2020–2023	Pärnu	55	(2)
2023	Ekranas	0	(0)
2023–2025	Neptūnas	5	(0)
2025	Ilbirs Bishkek	8	(0)
2025–2026	Kyrgyzaltyn	11	(0)
2026–	Ilbirs Bishkek	0	(0)
- * Club domestic league appearances and goals as of 9 March 2026

Nazar Tarasovych Vyzdryk (Ukrainian: Назар Тарасович Виздрик; born 27 April 1996) is a Ukrainian professional footballer who plays as a defender for Kyrgyz Premier League club Ilbirs Bishkek.

== Career ==
Vyzdryk is a product of the Youth Sportive School #4 Lviv and FC Karpaty Lviv Sportive School Systems. He made his debut for FC Karpaty playing as a substituted player in a match against FC Volyn Lutsk on 31 May 2017 in the Ukrainian Premier League.
