= Aleksandr Beldinov =

Kyrgyzstani footballer and manager

Personal information
- Full name: Aleksandr Beldinov
- Date of birth: 31 October 1981 (age 44)
- Place of birth: Kyrgyzstan, Soviet Union
- Position: Midfielder

Senior career*
Years	Team	Apps	(Gls)
2001	Ekolog Bishkek		
2002	Dinamo-Erkin Farm Bishkek		
2003	SKA-PVO Bishkek		
2004–2005	SKA-Shoro Bishkek		
2007	Aviator AAL Bishkek		
2008–2009	Sher-Ak-Dan Bishkek		
2010–2011	Neftchi Kochkor-Ata		
2012–2015	Alga Bishkek		

International career^{‡}
2003–2004	Kyrgyzstan	4	(0)
- * Club domestic league appearances and goals as of 13 August 2015 ‡ National team caps and goals as of 13 August 2015

Aleksandr Beldinov (Russian: Александр Бельдинов), born 31 October 1981, is a retired Kyrgyzstani footballer who was a midfield, and a football manager. He is known as former player and manager of Alga Bishkek. He was a member of the Kyrgyzstan national football team, and played four matches in the period 2003–2004.

== Career statistics ==
=== International ===
Kyrgyzstan national team
Year	Apps	Goals
2003	1	0
2004	3	0
Total	4	0
