= Denis Yaskovich =

Belarusian footballer (born 1995)

Personal information
- Date of birth: 30 August 1995 (age 31)
- Place of birth: Minsk, Belarus
- Height: 1.84 m (6 ft 0 in)
- Position: Defender

Team information
- Current team: Muras United
- Number: 2

Youth career
- 2011–2012: Dinamo Minsk
- 2013–2014: BATE Borisov

Senior career*
Years	Team	Apps	(Gls)
2015–2016	Dinamo Minsk	0	(0)
2015	→ Bereza-2010 (loan)	27	(2)
2016	→ Zvezda-BGU Minsk (loan)	24	(1)
2017	Slavia Mozyr	0	(0)
2017–2019	Energetik-BGU Minsk	54	(2)
2019	Torpedo-BelAZ Zhodino	3	(0)
2020	Gorodeya	22	(1)
2021	Krumkachy Minsk	31	(3)
2022	Minsk	27	(0)
2023–2024	Akzhayik	27	(1)
2024–	Muras United	31	(3)
- * Club domestic league appearances and goals as of 1 May 2025

Denis Yaskovich (Belarusian: Дзяніс Ясковіч; Russian: Денис Яскович; born 30 August 1995) is a Belarusian professional footballer who plays for Kyrgyz club Muras United.

== Personal life ==
He is son of former Belarus international footballer Syarhey Yaskovich.
