= FC Muras United =

Association football club in Kyrgyzstan

Muras United
- Full name: Football Club Muras United; Мурас Юнайтед футбол клубу
- Founded: February 22, 2023; 3 years ago
- Ground: Kurmanbek Stadium; Dolen Omurzakov Stadium (selected matches)
- Capacity: 7,000; 23,000
- Head coach: Edmar
- League: Kyrgyz Premier League
- 2025: Kyrgyz Premier League, 2nd of 14
Home colours	Away colours

Football Club Muras United (Kyrgyz: Мурас Юнайтед футбол клубу), also known as Muras United, is a Kyrgyz professional football club based in Manas, currently playing in the Kyrgyz Premier League.

== History ==
Muras United was founded in 2023 and admitted to the Kyrgyz Premier League in February of the same year. Before the start of the 2023 season, Valery Berezovsky was appointed manager of the club. At the end of their first season, Muras United finished 5th in the 2023 League and won the 2023 Kyrgyzstan Cup. On 25 December 2023, Andrei Kanchelskis was appointed the new manager of the club. Muras United also managed to defend their cup after winning the 2024 Kyrgyzstan Cup.

On 10 January 2025, Ukrainian Oleksandr Poklonskyi was appointed as the new head coach of Muras United. On 12 August 2025, Muras United defeated Bangladesh club Dhaka Abahani 2–0 in the 2025–26 AFC Challenge League preliminary stage and secured the group stage spot.

== Season records ==
=== Domestic ===
As of end of 2025 season

Season	League									Kyrgyzstan Cup	Top goalscorer		Managers
Season	Div.	Pos.	Pl.	W	D	L	GS	GA	P	Kyrgyzstan Cup	Name	League	Managers
2023	1st	5	27	12	6	9	41	34	42	Winners	(Kyrgyzstan) Bakhtiyar Duyshobekov	7	(Kyrgyzstan) Valery Berezovsky
2024	1st	3	27	16	6	5	50	34	54	Winners	(Kyrgyzstan) Abay Bokoleyev	7	(Russia) Andrei Kanchelskis
2025	1st	2	26	19	3	4	59	24	60	Runners-up	(Kyrgyzstan) Maksat Alygulov	11	(Ukraine) Oleksandr Poklonskyi (Ukraine) Serhiy Popov (Ukraine) Serhiy Puchkov

=== Continental ===
As of match played 11 August 2026

Competition	Pld	W	D	L	GF	GA
AFC Challenge League	7	3	2	2	9	4
Total	7	3	2	2	9	4

Season	Competition	Round	Club	Home	Away	Aggregate
2025–26	AFC Challenge League	Preliminary stage	(Bangladesh) Dhaka Abahani	—N/a	2–0	2–0
2025–26	AFC Challenge League	Group C	(Tajikistan) Regar-TadAZ	0–0		1st out of 4
2025–26	AFC Challenge League	Group C	(Lebanon) Safa	2–0		1st out of 4
2025–26	AFC Challenge League	Group C	(Kuwait) Al-Arabi	1–1		1st out of 4
2025–26	AFC Challenge League	Quarter-finals	(Lebanon) Al Ansar	3–0		3–0
2025–26	AFC Challenge League	Semi-finals	Al-Kuwait	1–2		1–2
2026–27	AFC Challenge League	Preliminary stage	(Bangladesh) Fortis	—N/a	0–1	0–1

== Players ==
=== Current squad ===
As of 31 August 2026

Note: Flags indicate national team as defined under FIFA eligibility rules; some limited exceptions apply. Players may hold more than one non-FIFA nationality.

No.	Pos.	Nation	Player
1	GK	KGZ	Aziret Ysmanaliev
2	MF	BLR	Denis Yaskovich
4	DF	UKR	Serhiy Kulynych
6	DF	KGZ	Temirlan Samat Uulu
7	DF	KGZ	Emir-Khan Kydyrshaev
8	MF	KGZ	Azim Azarov
9	FW	JPN	Mark Kurita
10	MF	KGZ	Amir Zhaparov
11	MF	KGZ	Baybol Ermekov
12	GK	UKR	Orest Kostyk
14	FW	GHA	Thomas Agyepong

No.	Pos.	Nation	Player
19	MF	KGZ	Nursultan Toktonaliev
20	FW	KGZ	Marlen Murzakhmatov
22	MF	KGZ	Alimardon Shukurov
23	MF	KGZ	Islam Yunusov
29	DF	UKR	Andriy Batsula
33	DF	UKR	Ihor Honchar
51	DF	UKR	Hlib Hrachov
85	DF	KGZ	Samat Abdylashimov
88	DF	NED	Tim Zeegers
99	GK	KGZ	Asan Askarbaev

== Managerial history ==
As of match played 28 November 2024

Name	Nat.	From	To	P	W	D	L	GS	GA	%W	Honours	Notes
Valery Berezovsky	Kyrgyzstan	2023	2023	31	16	6	9	49	36	51.61	Kyrgyzstan Cup (1)	
Andrei Kanchelskis	Russia	25 December 2023	2024	31	19	6	6	58	39	61.29	Kyrgyzstan Cup (1)	

== Honours ==
- Kyrgyzstan Cup
  - Winners (2): 2023, 2024
