= Volodymyr Zaimenko =

Ukrainian footballer

Personal information
- Full name: Volodymyr Viktorovych Zaimenko
- Date of birth: 18 April 1997 (age 29)
- Place of birth: Kryvyi Rih, Ukraine
- Height: 1.83 m (6 ft 0 in)
- Position: Centre-back

Team information
- Current team: Dordoi Bishkek
- Number: 3

Youth career
- 2008–2013: Kryvbas-84 Kryvyi Rih
- 2013–2014: RVUFK Kyiv

Senior career*
| Years | Team | Apps | (Gls) |
| 2014 | → Skala-2 Morshyn | 0 | (0) |
| 2014–2016 | Skala Stryi | 0 | (0) |
| 2016–2018 | Zorya Luhansk | 0 | (0) |
| 2018–2020 | Hirnyk Kryvyi Rih | 37 | (2) |
| 2020–2022 | Kryvbas Kryvyi Rih | 31 | (3) |
| 2022–2023 | DV Solingen | 12 | (2) |
| 2023–2024 | Alay | 28 | (1) |
| 2024– | Dordoi Bishkek | 0 | (0) |
- * Club domestic league appearances and goals as of 30 August 2024 @ 17:03(AEST)

Volodymyr Viktorovych Zaimenko (Ukrainian: Володимир Вікторович Заїменко; born 18 April 1997) is a Ukrainian professional footballer who plays as a centre-back for Ukrainian club Kryvbas Kryvyi Rih.
