= FC Uzgen =

Kyrgyz football club

Uzgen
- Full name: Football Club Uzgen; Өзгөн футбол клубу
- Founded: 2001; 25 years ago
- Ground: Central Stadium, Uzgen
- Capacity: 2,600
- League: Kyrgyz Premier League
- 2025: KPL,7th of 14
Home colours	Away colours	Third colours

FC Uzgen (Kyrgyz: Өзгөн футбол клубу), also romanized as FC Ozgon, is a Kyrgyz professional football club based in Uzgen, that currently plays in the top-division Kyrgyz Premier League.

== History ==
At the Kyrgyz Football Union general meeting on 20 December 2024, FC Uzgen was one of four new clubs accepted into the 2025 season, as the league expanded to fourteen clubs.

=== Names ===
- 2001 : Founded as Kara-Shoro
- 2004 : Renamed Uzgen
- 2005 : Renamed Kara-Shoro
- 2006 : Renamed Dostuk
- 2007 : Renamed Uzgen
- 2008 : Renamed Kara-Shoro
- 2023 : Renamed Uzgen

== Current squad ==
As of 2 April, 2026

Note: Flags indicate national team as defined under FIFA eligibility rules; some limited exceptions apply. Players may hold more than one non-FIFA nationality.

No.	Pos.	Nation	Player
2	DF	COL	Maicol Valencia
4	DF	KGZ	Ulanbek Sulaymanov
5	MF	COL	César Benavides
6	MF	RUS	Ivan Kozlov
7	MF	KGZ	Nurbolot Yrysbekov
8	MF	KGZ	Bektur Kochkonbaev
9	FW	TKM	Mihail Titow
10	FW	AZE	Orkhan Aliyev
11	MF	KGZ	Dinmukhamed Taalaybekov
13	MF	AZE	Ramin Ahmedov
14	MF	KGZ	Elizar Khalilov
17	FW	UZB	Izzatilla Abdullaev
18	FW	AZE	Ildar Alekperov
20	DF	KGZ	Anton Fedyunin

No.	Pos.	Nation	Player
21	DF	KGZ	Elaman Akylbekov
22	MF	KGZ	Kuduret Iskandarbekov
27	DF	KGZ	Amantur Shamurzayev
28	MF	UKR	Yuriy Senytskyi
35	GK	KGZ	Omurzak Oronbaev
55	GK	UKR	Yevhen Hrytsenko
47	DF	KGZ	Aibek Munarbekov
67	MF	UZB	Jakhongir Kushokov
70	MF	KGZ	Isa Mirlanbek uulu
77	DF	KGZ	Narynbek Myrzabek uulu
88	MF	KGZ	Islam Shamshiyev
97	DF	KGZ	Ibrakhim Zhetimishev
99	GK	KGZ	Javakhir Akbarov
—	FW	MEX	Adolfo Hernández
