= Yuriy Senytskyi =

Ukrainian footballer

Personal information
- Full name: Yuriy Ivanovych Senytskyi
- Date of birth: 15 May 1997 (age 29)
- Place of birth: Vuhlehirsk, Ukraine
- Height: 1.86 m (6 ft 1 in)
- Position: Defensive midfielder

Team information
- Current team: Kramatorsk
- Number: 20

Youth career
- 2010–2014: Shakhtar Donetsk

Senior career*
Years	Team	Apps	(Gls)
2014–2019	Shakhtar Donetsk	0	(0)
2017–2018	→ Illichivets-2 Mariupol (loan)	11	(0)
2018–2019	→ Avanhard Kramatorsk (loan)	24	(2)
2019–2022	Kramatorsk	60	(7)
2022–2023	Hirnyk-Sport Horishni Plavni	10	(0)
2023–2024	Alay Osh	11	(2)
2024–2025	Dordoi Bishkek	32	(4)
2025–2026	Alga Bishkek	12	(2)
2026–	Uzgen	0	(0)
- * Club domestic league appearances and goals as of 8 March 2026

Yuriy Ivanovych Senytskyi (Ukrainian: Юрій Іванович Сеницький; born 15 May 1997) is a Ukrainian professional footballer who plays as a defensive midfielder for Kyrgyz Premier League club Uzgen.
