= Mykola Ahapov =

Ukrainian footballer (born 1993)

Personal information
- Full name: Mykola Yuriyovych Ahapov
- Date of birth: 13 November 1993 (age 33)
- Place of birth: Kharkiv, Ukraine
- Height: 1.84 m (6 ft 0 in)
- Position: Forward

Team information
- Current team: Grobiņa
- Number: 9

Youth career
- 2006–2008: Arsenal Kharkiv
- 2009–2010: Metalist Kharkiv

Senior career*
Years	Team	Apps	(Gls)
2011	Arsenal-Politekhnik Kharkiv	9	(2)
2011	Enerhetyk Komsomolske	11	(7)
2013	Kolos Zachepylivka	8	(7)
2013	UVS Dnipropetrovsk	2	(1)
2013–2014	Desna Chernihiv	35	(3)
2015–2016	Helios Kharkiv	17	(2)
2016–2017	Avanhard Kramatorsk	24	(5)
2017–2018	Gebzespor	24	(9)
2018–2019	İçelspor	18	(9)
2019	Surkhon Termez	0	(0)
2019	Univer-Dynamo Kharkiv	0	(0)
2020–2022	Alians Lypova Dolyna	45	(15)
2022	Mash'al Mubarek	17	(8)
2023	Akzhayik	8	(7)
2024–2025	Sri Pahang	23	(3)
2025–	Grobiņa	8	(4)
- * Club domestic league appearances and goals as of 17 November 2025

Mykola Yuriyovych Ahapov (Ukrainian: Микола Юрійович Агапов; born 13 November 1993) is a Ukrainian professional footballer who plays as a forward for Latvian Higher League club Grobiņa.

== Career ==
Born in Kharkiv, in 2006 Ahapov began his career in the local Arsenal youth sportive school with a short stint in Metalist academy. Graduated in 2010, until 2013 Ahapov played in amateur competitions after which he was picked by the First League Desna Chernihiv. Until 2017 he stayed in competitions of the First League playing for Helios and Avanhard. In 2017 Ahapov managed to sign with some clubs abroad for couple of year.

In 2019 Ahapov returned to Ukraine and in 2020 joined the newly formed Alians. In May 2021 he was recognized as a player of the month by the Ukrainian PFL.

In 22nd February 2024 Ahapov join Malaysian club, Sri Pahang for new challenge.
