= Mirlan Eshenov =

Kyrgyzstani football manager

Personal information
- Date of birth: 14 March 1988 (age 38)
- Place of birth: Kyrgyzstan, USSR

Senior career*
Years	Team	Apps	(Gls)
2007–20xx	FC Abdish-Ata Kant		
20xx–2012	FC Dinamo Bishkek		

Managerial career
- 2014: FC Abdish-Ata Kant
- 2014: Kyrgyzstan (caretaker)
- * Club domestic league appearances and goals

Mirlan Eshenov (Russian: Мирлан Байышбекович Эшенов; born 14 March 1988 in USSR) is a Kyrgyzstani professional football manager.

== Career ==
In 2007, he began his professional career for the FC Abdish-Ata Kant. Until 2012 he played for the FC Dinamo Bishkek.

In 2014, he started his coaching career in FC Abdish-Ata Kant. Since 12 June until 20 October 2014 he was a caretaker coach of the Kyrgyzstan national football team.
