= FC Talant =

Kyrgyzstani association football club

- Founded: 2020; 6 years ago
- Ground: Sport City Stadion
- Capacity: 1,500
- Manager: Isakov Nazar Almazbekovich
- League: Kyrgyz Premier League
- 2025: 8th
- Website: Website

Football Club Talant (Russian: Футбольный клуб «Талант») is an association football club based in Besh-Kungoy, Kyrgyzstan that currently competes in the Kyrgyz Premier League.

== History ==
FC Talant was founded in 2020.
