= Ilbirs Bishkek FC =

Kyrgyz football club

Ilbirs Bishkek
- Full name: Ilbirs Bishkek Football Club
- Founded: 2018; 8 years ago
- Ground: Stadium FC FFKR
- Capacity: 1,000
- Manager: Mirlan Eshenov
- League: Kyrgyz Premier League
- 2025: KPL, 12th of 14
Home colours	Away colours

Football Club Ilbirs Bishkek (Kyrgyz: Илбирс Бишкек Футбол Клубу, Ilbirs Bişkek Futbol Klubu) is a Kyrgyz professional football club based in Bishkek. Founded in 2018, the club competes in Kyrgyz Premier League.

== History ==
=== Domestic history ===
Season	League									Kyrgyzstan Cup	Top goalscorer		Manager
Season	Div.	Pos.	Pl.	W	D	L	GS	GA	P	Kyrgyzstan Cup	Name	League	Manager
2018	1st	6th	28	5	3	20	34	73	18	Round of 16	Gulzhigit Borubaev; Ermek Nusubaliyev	8	
2019	1st	6th	28	10	5	13	49	46	35	Round of 16			
2020	1st	8th	14	0	2	12	6	29	2	Quarterfinal	Amanzhan Zhanybek uulu	2	
2021	1st	7th	28	5	2	21	24	54	17	n/a	Marlen Murzakhmatov	7	
2022	1st	8th	27	7	8	12	24	29	29				

== Players ==
=== Current squad ===
As of 2 April, 2026

Note: Flags indicate national team as defined under FIFA eligibility rules; some limited exceptions apply. Players may hold more than one non-FIFA nationality.

No.	Pos.	Nation	Player
1	GK	KGZ	Ermek Kemelbekov
3	DF	KGZ	Meder Tuganbaev
4	DF	KGZ	Aidar Muratbekov
5	DF	KGZ	Aitenir Balbakov
6	DF	KGZ	Aktan Abdykalilov
7	FW	KGZ	Mustafa Seyitkaziev
8	MF	KGZ	Alibek Kazakbaev
10	MF	KGZ	Arlen Imerov
11	FW	KGZ	Amantur Isakov
12	DF	KGZ	Mukhammadyusuf Makhmudzhanov
14	MF	KGZ	Zhanbolot Ormonov
16	GK	KGZ	Daniel Kuluev
17	DF	KGZ	Bekzat Urmamatov
20	FW	RUS	Ilya Karpuk

No.	Pos.	Nation	Player
21	MF	KGZ	Kanay Mederbekov
22	DF	KGZ	Ilya Bondarenko
24	MF	KGZ	Daniel Omarov
25	FW	KGZ	Kaleb Kopytin
27	DF	KGZ	Erbol Bakirdinov
29	DF	UKR	Nazar Vyzdryk
32	DF	KGZ	Nadzhibullo Alizhanov
35	MF	UKR	Taras Hevlych
37	MF	BLR	Andrey Levkovets
47	FW	KAZ	Alisher Rakhimzhanov
50	MF	UKR	Oleksandr Dovhyi
88	DF	KGZ	Shakhsultan Jumabaev
95	DF	KGZ	Arseniy Kozhushko
99	GK	UKR	Mykhaylo Hotra
