= Kyrgyzstan national football team results (2020–present) =

This article provides details of international football games played by the Kyrgyzstan national football team from 2020 to present.

== Results ==
Key
Win
Draw
Defeat

=== 2021 ===
7 June 2021 2022 World Cup qualification	Kyrgyzstan	0–1	Mongolia	Osaka, Japan
13:00 UTC+6		Report	Mijiddorj 34'	Stadium: Yanmar Stadium Nagai; Referee: Yu Ming-hsun (Chinese Taipei)

11 June 2021 2022 World Cup qualification	Myanmar	1–8	Kyrgyzstan	Osaka, Japan
16:00 UTC+9	Hlaing Bo Bo 69'	Report	Rustamov 22'; Alykulov 29'; Musabekov 34'; Shukurov 45'; Murzaev 45+2', 61', 78'; Bokoleyev 63'	Stadium: Yanmar Stadium Nagai; Referee: Hussein Abou Yehya (Lebanon)

15 June 2021 2022 World Cup qualification	Japan	5–1	Kyrgyzstan	Suita, Japan
19:25 UTC+9	Onaiwu 27' (pen.), 31', 33'; Sasaki 72'; Asano 77'	Report	Murzaev 45+2' (pen.)	Stadium: Panasonic Stadium; Referee: Omar Al-Yaqoubi (Oman)

2 September 2021 2021 Three Nations Cup	Kyrgyzstan	1–0	Palestine	Bishkek, Kyrgyzstan
20:30 UTC+6	Azarov 26'	Report		Stadium: Dolen Omurzakov Stadium; Referee: Akhrol Riskullaev (Uzbekistan)

7 September 2021 2021 Three Nations Cup	Kyrgyzstan	4–1	Bangladesh	Bishkek, Kyrgyzstan
20:30 UTC+6	Moldozhunusov 10'; Shukurov 39'; Rustamov 46'; Duyshobekov 89'	Report	Sufil 53'	Stadium: Dolen Omurzakov Stadium; Attendance: 14,000; Referee: Rustam Lutfullin (Uzbekistan)

11 November 2021 Friendly	Kyrgyzstan	2–1	Singapore	Sharjah, United Arab Emirates
20:00 UTC+6	Akmatov 3'; Batyrkanov 9'	Report	Sulaiman 21'	Stadium: Al Hamriya Sports Club Stadium; Referee: Yahya Ali Al Mulla (United Arab Emirates)

16 November 2021 Friendly	Bahrain	4–2	Kyrgyzstan	Riffa, Bahrain
19:00 UTC+3	Madan 23'; Marhoon 45+1', 50'; Al Aswad 71'	Report	Kichin 16' (pen.); Abdurakhmanov 24'	Stadium: Bahrain National Stadium

=== 2022 ===
25 March 2022 Navruz Cup	Uzbekistan	3–1	Kyrgyzstan	Namangan, Uzbekistan
16:30 UTC+6	Shomurodov 64'; Sergeyev 85', 90'		Murzayev 6'	Stadium: Markaziy Stadium

29 March 2022 Navruz Cup	Tajikistan	1–0	Kyrgyzstan	Namangan, Uzbekistan
16:00 UTC+6	Umarbayev 54'	Report		Stadium: Markaziy Stadium; Referee: R. Lutfullin

8 June 2022 2023 Asian Cup qualification	Kyrgyzstan	2–1	Singapore	Bishkek, Kyrgyzstan
21:00 UTC+6	Kichin 77' (pen.); Maier 82'	Report	Song Ui-young 57'	Stadium: Dolen Omurzakov Stadium; Attendance: 7,322; Referee: Feras Taweel (Syria)

11 June 2022 2023 Asian Cup qualification	Myanmar	0–2	Kyrgyzstan	Bishkek, Kyrgyzstan
21:00 UTC+6		Report	Maier 25', 45'	Stadium: Dolen Omurzakov Stadium; Attendance: 7,522; Referee: Rowan Arumughan (India)

14 June 2022 2023 Asian Cup qualification	Kyrgyzstan	0–0	Tajikistan	Bishkek, Kyrgyzstan
21:00 UTC+6		Report		Stadium: Dolen Omurzakov Stadium; Attendance: 17,340; Referee: Ko Hyung-jin (South Korea)

24 September 2022 Friendly	Kyrgyzstan	1–2	Russia	Bishkek, Kyrgyzstan
20:00 UTC+6	Shukurov 24'	Report	Sobolev 30' (pen.); Utkin 89'	Stadium: Dolen Omurzakov Stadium; Referee: Daniyar Sakhi (Kazakhstan)

=== 2023 ===
25 March 2023 2023 Tri-Nation Series	Myanmar	1–1	Kyrgyzstan	Imphal, India
18:00 UTC+5:30	Aung Thu 82'	Report	Zhyrgalbek uulu 90+6'	Stadium: Khuman Lampak Main Stadium; Attendance: 9,563; Referee: Nasir Uddin (Bangladesh)

28 March 2023 2023 Tri-Nation Series	India	2–0	Kyrgyzstan	Imphal, India
18:00 UTC+5:30	Jhingan 34'; Chhetri 84' (pen.)	Report		Stadium: Khuman Lampak Main Stadium; Attendance: 29,877; Referee: Md Alamgir Sarker (Bangladesh)

10 June 2023 CAFA Nations Cup	Kyrgyzstan	3–0; Awarded	Afghanistan 'B'	Bishkek, Kyrgyzstan
	Batyrkanov 90+7'			Stadium: Dolen Omurzakov Stadium; Referee: Sadullo Gulmurodi (Tajikistan)
Note: The match was abandoned in the 97th minute with Kyrgyzstan leading 1–0 after Afghanistan walked off and refused to continue. The match was awarded 3–0 to Kyrgyzstan.

16 June 2023 CAFA Nations Cup	Kyrgyzstan	1–5	Iran	Bishkek, Kyrgyzstan
	Murzayev 52'		Taremi 34', 39' (pen.), 56'; Azmoun 66', 79'	Stadium: Dolen Omurzakov Stadium; Referee: Akhrol Riskullaev (Uzbekistan)

20 June 2023 CAFA Nations Cup	Kyrgyzstan	0–1	Oman	Tashkent, Uzbekistan
				Stadium: Pakhtakor Central Stadium

11 September Friendly	Kuwait	1–3	Kyrgyzstan	Dubai, United Arab Emirates
21:00 UTC+4	Abdullah 26'	Report	Alykulov 43'; Kojo 70', 88'	Stadium: The Sevens Stadium

12 October Friendly	Bahrain	2–0	Kyrgyzstan	Manama, Bahrain
				Stadium: Al Ahli Stadium

15 October Friendly	Kyrgyzstan	0–1	Philippines	Arad, Bahrain
			Menzi	Stadium: Al Muharraq Stadium

16 November 2026 World Cup qualification	Malaysia	4–3	Kyrgyzstan	Kuala Lumpur, Malaysia
21:00 UTC+8	Cools 7', 77'; Brauzman 72' (o.g.); Faisal 90+3'	Report	Zhyrgalbek uulu 42'; Batyrkanov 44'; Merk 57'	Stadium: Bukit Jalil National Stadium; Attendance: 17,142; Referee: Ammar Mahfoodh (Bahrain)

=== 2024 ===
6 June 2026 World Cup qualification 2R	Kyrgyzstan	1–1	Malaysia	Bishkek, Kyrgyzstan
21:00 UTC+6	Alykulov 24'	Report (FIFA); Report (AFC)	Abdurakhmanov 38' (o.g.)	Stadium: Dolen Omurzakov Stadium; Attendance: 14,135; Referee: Adham Makhadmeh (Jordan)

11 June 2026 World Cup qualification 2R	Oman	1–1	Kyrgyzstan	Muscat, Oman
20:00 UTC+4	Tokotayev 57' (o.g.)	Report	Zarypbekov 19'	Stadium: Sultan Qaboos Sports Complex; Attendance: 13,754; Referee: Alireza Faghani (Australia)

30 August Unofficial friendly	Kyrgyzstan	0–0	(Algeria) MC Oran	Izmit, Turkey
				Stadium: İhsaniye Stadium

5 September 2026 WCQ - 3rd round	Iran	1–0	Kyrgyzstan	Fuladshahr, Iran
19:30 UTC+3:30	Taremi 34'			Stadium: Fuladshahr Stadium; Referee: Yusuke Araki (Japan)

10 September 2026 WCQ - 3rd round	Kyrgyzstan	2–3	Uzbekistan	Bishkek, Kyrgyzstan
20:00 UTC+6	Kojo 15'; Abdurakhmanov 35'		Shomurodov 17'; Aliqulov 45'; Urunov 72'	Stadium: Dolen Omurzakov Stadium; Attendance: 13,282; Referee: Ahmed Al-Alili (Kuwait)

10 October 2026 WCQ - 3rd round	Qatar	3–1	Kyrgyzstan	Al Rayyan, Qatar
19:00 UTC+3	Ali 39'; Kozubaev 63' (o.g.); Al-Hassan 81'	Report	Shukurov 76'	Stadium: Ahmad bin Ali Stadium; Referee: Muhammad Taqi (Singapore)

15 October 2026 WCQ - 3rd round	Kyrgyzstan	1–0	North Korea	Bishkek, Kyrgyzstan
20:00 UTC+6	Brauzman 11'	Report		Stadium: Dolen Omurzakov Stadium; Referee: Khaled Al-Hoish (Saudi Arabia)

14 November 2026 WCQ - 3rd round	United Arab Emirates	3–0	Kyrgyzstan	Abu Dhabi, United Arab Emirates
--:-- UTC+4				Stadium: Mohammed bin Zayed Stadium

19 November 2026 WCQ - 3rd round	Kyrgyzstan	2–3	Iran	Bishkek, Kyrgyzstan
20:00 UTC+6	Kojo 51', 64' (pen.)	Report	Taremi 12'; Hardani 33'; Azmoun 76'	Stadium: Dolen Omurzakov Stadium; Referee: Ma Ning (China)

=== 2025 ===
20 March 2025 2026 WCQ - 3rd round	Uzbekistan	1–0	Kyrgyzstan	Tashkent, Uzbekistan
21:00 UTC+5	Alijonov 40'	Report		Stadium: Milliy Stadium; Attendance: 32,458; Referee: Yusuke Araki (Japan)

25 March 2025 2026 WCQ - 3rd round	Kyrgyzstan	3–1	Qatar	Bishkek, Kyrgyzstan
19:45 UTC+6	Kichin 45+1'; Mishchenko 82'; Shukurov 90+3'	Report	Mendes 52'	Stadium: Dolen Omurzakov Stadium; Referee: Nazmi Nasaruddin (Malaysia)

5 June 2026 WCQ - 3rd round	North Korea	2–2	Kyrgyzstan	Riyadh, Saudi Arabia
21:15 UTC+3	Pak Kwang-hun 44'; Ri Jo-guk 52'	Report	Alykulov 57'; Kim Sung-hye 90+5' (o.g.)	Stadium: Prince Faisal bin Fahd Sports City Stadium; Attendance: 100; Referee: Adham Makhadmeh (Jordan)

10 June 2026 WCQ - 3rd round	Kyrgyzstan	1–1	United Arab Emirates	Bishkek, Kyrgyzstan
19:45 UTC+6	Merk 90+5'	Report	Abdalla 30'	Stadium: Dolen Omurzakov Stadium; Attendance: 12,258; Referee: Ahmed Al-Ali (Kuwait)

30 August 2025 CAFA Nations Cup	Kyrgyzstan	1–1	Turkmenistan	Tashkent, Uzbekistan
17:00 UTC+5	Kojo 45'	GSA Report	Jumaýew 44'	Stadium: JAR Stadium; Referee: Sajëçon Zajniddinov (Tajikistan)

2 September 2025 CAFA Nations Cup	Oman	2–1	Kyrgyzstan	Tashkent, Uzbekistan
17:00 UTC+5	Al Sabhi 90+1', 90+5'	GSA Report	Kozubayev 24'	Stadium: JAR Stadium; Referee: Hasan Akrami (Iran)

5 September 2025 CAFA Nations Cup	Uzbekistan	4–0	Kyrgyzstan	Tashkent, Uzbekistan
19:30 UTC+5	Mozgovoy 20'; Shukurov 67' (pen.); Sergeev 82'; Turgunboev 90+3'	GSA Report		Stadium: Olympic City Stadium; Referee: Sadullo Gulmurodi (Tajikistan)

=== 2026 ===
25 March Friendly	Kyrgyzstan	0–1	Equatorial Guinea	Antalya, Türkiye
17:00 UTC+3		Report	Josete 40' (pen.)	Stadium: Emirhan Sport Complex; Referee: Cihan Aydın (Turkey)

28 March Friendly	Kyrgyzstan	2–5	Madagascar	Belek, Türkiye
17:00 UTC+2	Almazbekov 58' (pen.); Köçkönbaev 62'	Report	Randrianantenaina 5'; Fontaine 17'; Caddy 24', 79' (pen.); Couturier 42'	Stadium: Calista Sports Center; Referee: Kadir Sağlam (Turkey)

30 March Friendly	Kyrgyzstan	Cancelled	Bahrain	Antalya, Türkiye
--:-- UTC+3
Note: Match cancelled due to travel disruptions from the 2026 Iran war.

6 June Friendly	Palestine	0–0	Kyrgyzstan	Bishkek, Kyrgyzstan
20:30 UTC+6				Stadium: Dolen Omurzakov Stadium

9 June Friendly	Kyrgyzstan	0–0	Palestine	Bishkek, Kyrgyzstan
20:30 UTC+6				Stadium: Dolen Omurzakov Stadium

28 September Friendly	Kyrgyzstan	5–0	Maldives	Bishkek, Kyrgyzstan
20:00 UTC+6	Atabayev 11', 23'; Sirozhiddin 20'; Murzakov 32'; Kojo 42'	Report		Stadium: Dolen Omurzakov Stadium

4 October Friendly	Kyrgyzstan	3–1	Lebanon	Bishkek, Kyrgyzstan
20:00 UTC+6	Abdurakhmanov 19'; Shukurov 31'; Khamis 64' (o.g.)	Report	Budib 62'	Stadium: Dolen Omurzakov Stadium; Referee: Rafael Shafeev (Russia)

14 November 2026 Casper Cup	Chinese Taipei	0–3	Kyrgyzstan	Ninh Bình, Vietnam
19:00 UTC+7		Report	Zhyrgalbek uulu 31'; Kojo 44'; Akmatov 90+1'	Stadium: Thiên Trường Stadium; Referee: Hoàng Ngọc Hà (Vietnam)

17 November 2026 Casper Cup	Kyrgyzstan	2–1	Vietnam	Ninh Bình, Vietnam
19:00 UTC+7	Kichin 86'; Atabayev 88'	Report	Nguyễn Đình Bắc 19'	Stadium: Thiên Trường Stadium; Attendance: 5,102; Referee: Nawal Zubir (Malaysia)
