= North Korea national football team results (2020–present) =

This article provides details of international football games played by the North Korea national football team from 2020 to present.

== Fixtures and results ==
=== 2021 ===
3 June 2021 2022 FIFA World Cup qualification	North Korea	Cancelled	Sri Lanka	North Korea

7 June 2021 2022 FIFA World Cup qualification	South Korea	Cancelled	North Korea	South Korea

15 June 2021 2022 FIFA World Cup qualification	North Korea	Cancelled	Turkmenistan	North Korea

=== 2023 ===
16 November 2023 2026 FIFA World Cup qualification	Syria	1–0	North Korea	Jeddah, Saudi Arabia
20:00 UTC+3	Al Somah 37' (pen.)	Report		Stadium: Prince Abdullah Al Faisal Stadium (Note: Syria played their home game at a neutral venue due to the ongoing Syrian civil war.); Attendance: 4,285; Referee: Alireza Faghani (Australia)

21 November 2023 2026 FIFA World Cup qualification	Myanmar	1–6	North Korea	Yangon, Myanmar
16:00 UTC+6:30	Win Naing Tun 77'	Report	Jong Il-gwan 30', 54', 56'; Choe Ju-song 34' (pen.); Han Kwang-song 38'; Ri Hyong-jin 70'	Stadium: Thuwunna Stadium; Attendance: 9,500; Referee: Ilgiz Tantashev (Uzbekistan)

=== 2024 ===
21 March 2024 2026 FIFA World Cup qualification	Japan	1–0	North Korea	Tokyo, Japan
19:23 UTC+9	Tanaka 2'	Report (FIFA); Report (AFC)		Stadium: Japan National Stadium; Attendance: 59,354; Referee: Adel Al-Naqbi (United Arab Emirates)

26 March 2024 2026 FIFA World Cup qualification	North Korea	0–3; Awarded (Note: North Korea were originally scheduled to play host to Japan in Kim Il-sung Stadium. However, North Korea then decided against hosting it due to "a malignant infectious disease" spreading in Japan. Due to the time gap and North Korea's inability to provide an alternative venue, FIFA subsequently decided that the match shall neither be played nor rescheduled, and the matter will be decided by FIFA Disciplinary Committee. It was later announced that Japan would be awarded a 0–3 victory by forfeit.)	Japan	Pyongyang, North Korea
		Report		Stadium: Kim Il-sung Stadium

6 June 2024 2026 FIFA World Cup qualification	North Korea	1–0	Syria	Vientiane, Laos (Note: Following the incident over North Korea's refusal to host a home game against Japan, North Korea will play their home matches in a neutral ground, per Syria's request.)
20:00 UTC+7	Jong Il-Gwan 90+2'	Report		Stadium: New Laos National Stadium; Attendance: 100; Referee: Salman Falahi (Qatar)

11 June 2024 2026 FIFA World Cup qualification	North Korea	4–1	Myanmar	Vientiane, Laos
20:00 UTC+7	Ri Il-song 12'; Ri Jo-guk 16', 43', 87' (pen.)	Report	Wai Lin Aung 57'	Stadium: New Laos National Stadium; Attendance: 141; Referee: Shen Yinhao (China)

27 August 2024 Friendly	Jordan	0–0	North Korea	Amman, Jordan
19:00 UTC+3		Report		Stadium: Petra Stadium; Attendance: 0
Note: The match was held behind closed doors.

29 August 2024 Friendly	Jordan	2–1	North Korea	Amman, Jordan
19:00 UTC+3	Olwan	Report		Stadium: Amman International Stadium; Attendance: 0
Note: The match was held behind closed doors.

5 September 2024 2026 FIFA World Cup qualification	Uzbekistan	1–0	North Korea	Tashkent, Uzbekistan
19:00 UTC+5	Masharipov 20'	Report		Stadium: Milliy Stadium; Attendance: 24,205; Referee: Ahmed Al-Kaf (Oman)

10 September 2024 2026 FIFA World Cup qualification	North Korea	2–2	Qatar	Vientiane, Laos (Note: The North Korean team confirmed to move the venue to Vientiane for the matches against Qatar and Iran due to "security concerns".)
19:00 UTC+7	Ri Il-song 19'; Kang Kuk-chol 52'	Report	Afif 31' (pen.); Ali 44'	Stadium: New Laos National Stadium; Attendance: 140; Referee: Nazmi Nasaruddin (Malaysia)

10 October 2024 2026 FIFA World Cup qualification	United Arab Emirates	1–1	North Korea	Al Ain, United Arab Emirates
20:00 UTC+4	Al-Ghassani 66'	Report	Jong Il-gwan 86'	Stadium: Hazza bin Zayed Stadium; Attendance: 8,536; Referee: Adham Makhadmeh (Jordan)

15 October 2024 2026 FIFA World Cup qualification	Kyrgyzstan	1–0	North Korea	Bishkek, Kyrgyzstan
20:00 UTC+6	Brauzman 11'	Report		Stadium: Dolen Omurzakov Stadium; Attendance: 9,769; Referee: Khaled Al-Hoish (Saudi Arabia)

14 November 2024 2026 FIFA World Cup qualification	North Korea	2–3	Iran	Vientiane, Laos
19:00 UTC+7	Taremi 56' (o.g.); Kim Yu-song 59'	Report	Ghayedi 29'; Mohebi 41', 45'	Stadium: New Laos National Stadium; Attendance: 100; Referee: Sadullo Gulmurodi (Tajikistan)

19 November 2024 2026 FIFA World Cup qualification	North Korea	0–1	Uzbekistan	Vientiane, Laos
19:00 UTC+7		Report	Fayzullaev 44'	Stadium: New Laos National Stadium; Attendance: 166; Referee: Ahmed Al-Ali (Kuwait)

8 December 2024 2025 EAFF E-1 Championship preliminary round	Guam	Cancelled	North Korea	Mong Kok, Hong Kong
14:00 UTC+8				Stadium: Mong Kok Stadium
Note: North Korea withdrew shortly after the draw

14 December 2024 2025 EAFF E-1 Championship preliminary round	North Korea	Cancelled	Macau	Mong Kok, Hong Kong
14:00 UTC+8				Stadium: Mong Kok Stadium
Note: North Korea withdrew shortly after the draw

=== 2025 ===
17 February 2025 Friendly	Kazakhstan	0–2	North Korea	Antalya, Turkey
17:00 UTC+3		Report	Ri Il-song 70', 90+5'	Stadium: Titanic Deluxe Belek Football Center; Referee: Atilla Karaoğlan (Turkey)

14 March 2025 Friendly	Jordan	1–1	North Korea	Amman, Jordan
21:15 UTC+3		Report		Stadium: Amman International Stadium; Attendance: 0

20 March 2025 2026 FIFA World Cup qualification	Qatar	5–1	North Korea	Doha, Qatar
21:15 UTC+3	Afif 17'; Al Ganehi 23'; Kim Yu-song 34' (o.g.); Al-Rawi 56'; Alaaeldin 66'	Report	Pak Kwang-hun 86'	Stadium: Jassim bin Hamad Stadium; Attendance: 10,375; Referee: Mohanad Qasim Sarray (Iraq)

25 March 2025 2026 FIFA World Cup qualification	North Korea	1–2	United Arab Emirates	Riyadh, Saudi Arabia (Note: North Korea chose Riyadh as their home site for their match against United Arab Emirates due to "security concerns".)
21:15 UTC+3	Kim Yu-song 43'	Report	Lima 5'; Adil 90+8'	Stadium: Prince Faisal bin Fahd Sports City Stadium; Attendance: 223; Referee: Mohammed Al Hoish (Saudi Arabia)

5 June 2025 2026 FIFA World Cup qualification	North Korea	2–2	Kyrgyzstan	Riyadh, Saudi Arabia
21:15 UTC+3	Pak Kwang-hun 44'; Ri Jo-guk 52'	Report	Alykulov 57'; Kim Sung-hye 90+5' (o.g.)	Stadium: Prince Faisal bin Fahd Sports City Stadium; Attendance: 100; Referee: Adham Makhadmeh (Jordan)

10 June 2025 2026 FIFA World Cup qualification	Iran	3–0	North Korea	Tehran, Iran
19:30 UTC+3:30	Mohebi 74'; Taremi 77'; Hosseinzadeh 90+3'	Report		Stadium: Azadi Stadium; Referee: Nazmi Nasaruddin (Malaysia)

=== 2027 ===
8 January 2027 2027 AFC Asian Cup	Bahrain	v	North Korea	Riyadh, Saudi Arabia
--:-- UTC+3				Stadium: Imam Mohammed Ibn Saud University Stadium

13 January 2027 2027 AFC Asian Cup	North Korea	v	Uzbekistan	Riyadh, Saudi Arabia
--:-- UTC+3				Stadium: Kingdom Arena

18 January 2027 2027 AFC Asian Cup	North Korea	v	Jordan	Riyadh, Saudi Arabia
--:-- UTC+3				Stadium: Imam Mohammed Ibn Saud University Stadium

== Head-to-head record ==
As of 10 June 2025 after the match against Iran.

Opponent	Pld	W	D	L	GF	GA	GD	Win %
Iran	2	0	0	2	2	6	−4	0.00
Japan	2	0	0	2	0	4	−4	0.00
Jordan	3	0	2	1	2	3	−1	0.00
Kazakhstan	1	1	0	0	2	0	+2	100.00
Kyrgyzstan	2	0	1	1	2	3	−1	0.00
Myanmar	2	2	0	0	10	2	+8	100.00
Qatar	2	0	1	1	3	7	−4	0.00
Syria	2	1	0	1	1	1	+0	50.00
United Arab Emirates	2	0	1	1	2	3	−1	0.00
Uzbekistan	2	0	0	2	0	2	−2	0.00
Total	20	4	5	11	24	31	−7	20.00
