= Wang Yudong =

Chinese footballer (born 2006)

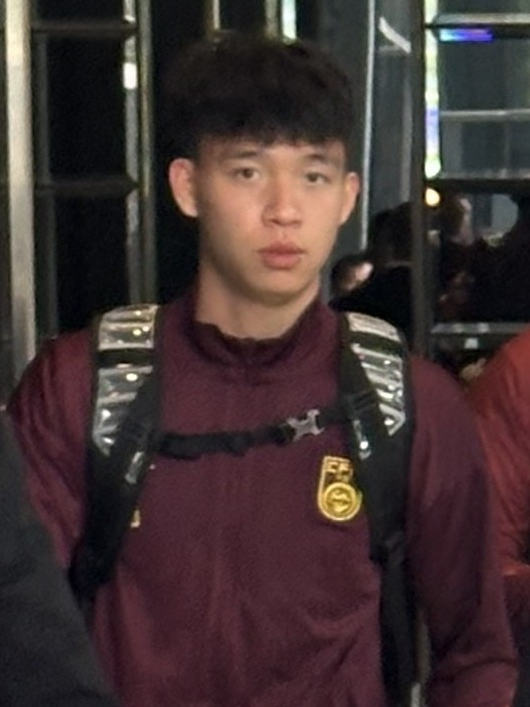
- Wang with China in 2025

Personal information
- Full name: Wang Yudong
- Date of birth: 23 November 2006 (age 19)
- Place of birth: Fenghua, Zhejiang, China
- Height: 1.83 m (6 ft 0 in)
- Position: Left winger

Team information
- Current team: Zhejiang FC
- Number: 11

Youth career
- Shanghai Shenrui
- Taizhou Ostrich
- 2021: Ningbo Sports School
- 2021–2023: Zhejiang FA

Senior career*
Years	Team	Apps	(Gls)
2023–	Zhejiang FC	72	(20)

International career^{‡}
2022–2023	China U17	6	(11)
2024–2025	China U20	8	(3)
2023–	China U23	19	(6)
2025–	China	12	(2)
Medal record
Men's football
Representing China
EAFF Championship
Third place	2025 South Korea	Team
AFC U-23 Asian Cup
Runner-up	2026 Saudi Arabia	Team
Asian Games
Bronze medal – third place	2026 Aichi–Nagoya	Team
- * Club domestic league appearances and goals as of 8 November 2026 ‡ National team caps and goals as of 14 November 2026

Wang Yudong (simplified Chinese: 王钰栋; traditional Chinese: 王鈺棟; pinyin: Wáng Yùdòng; born 23 November 2006) is a Chinese professional footballer who plays as a left winger for Chinese Super League club Zhejiang FC and the China national team.

== Early life ==
Born in Dayan Town in the Fenghua District of Ningbo on 23 November 2006, Wang moved to Shenzhen at a young age, as his father had done business there, being educated at Shenzhen Dongfang Primary School. To help with Wang's development in football, his father built him a football pitch in Shenzhen, and formed an amateur football club. After moving back to Zhejiang, his home province, he first joined the Shanghai Shenrui, then moved to the Zhejiang Ostrich youth academy. In 2021, he joined Ningbo Sports School to play in the Ningbo Football Super League.

== Club career ==
In 2021, Wang started training with the Zhejiang FA youth team, a feeder team to Zhejiang FC.

On 20 July 2023, he signed his first professional contract at Zhejiang FC, joining the first-team with immediate effect. Five days later on 25 July, he made his senior debut for Zhejiang, coming on as a substitute for Yue Xin in a 5–1 loss to Shanghai Shenhua in the Chinese FA Cup. Wang made his Chinese Super League debut a month later on 26 August, coming on for the final six minutes in a 3–0 win over Dalian Pro.

On 20 September, he came on to make his AFC Champions League debut in a 4–1 away defeat to Buriram United, becoming the youngest Chinese footballer to ever make an appearance in the competition. On 29 October 2023, he made his first goal contribution for Zhejiang, in a league game against Cangzhou Mighty Lions, providing an assist for Ji Shengpan to seal the victory for the club at 6–1. On 26 February 2024, he was awarded the 2023 Chinese Golden Boy award for the under-17 level.

On 28 November 2024, Wang scored his first senior and professional goal, in a 4–2 home AFC Champions League Two win over Singaporean side Lion City Sailors; in the same match, he also provided an assist for Jean Evrard Kouassi. On 28 March 2025, Wang scored his first Chinese Super League goal, in a 4–0 away win against Wuhan Three Towns.

== International career ==
Wang had first been involved in China youth teams in 2019, when he was selected for a China U12 squad. He later captained in the U14 level, and later on featured in U16 squads as early as 2021.

In 2022, he was selected for 2023 AFC U-17 Asian Cup qualification matches with the China under-17 national team, where he scored eight goals in three games, gaining qualification into the final tournament.

On 3 June 2023, he was named in the final squad for the 2023 AFC U-17 Asian Cup. In the Asian Cup, Wang scored a double against Australia, and another goal against Tajikistan.

On 26 December 2023, Wang made his debut for the China under-23 national team in a friendly against Malaysia, aged 17. Three months later on 5 April 2024, Wang was included in the China U23 squad for the 2024 AFC U-23 Asian Cup.

On 28 February 2025, Wang received his first call-up to the China national team, in preparation for two 2026 FIFA World Cup qualifier matches against Saudi Arabia and Australia. On 25 March 2025, Wang made his debut for the China national team, coming on as a 66th minute substitute for Xie Wenneng in a 2–0 home loss to Australia.

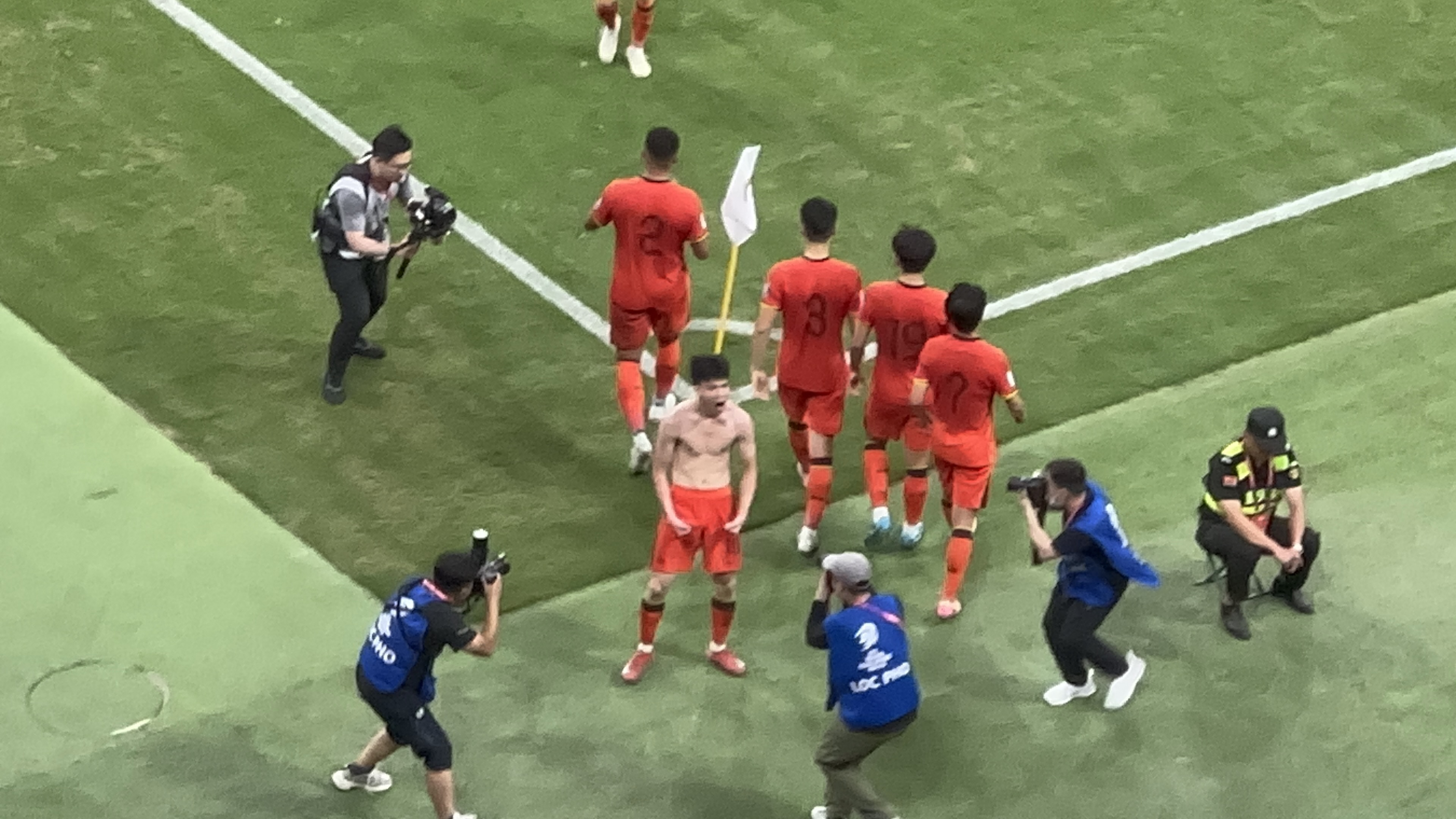
Wang celebrating his first goal with the China national team on 10 June 2025

On 10 June 2025, Wang scored his first goal for the national team from the penalty kick in a 1–0 home win against Bahrain in the last game of 2026 FIFA World Cup qualification.

== Personal life ==
In 2022, Wang claimed in an interview that he is a fan of Neymar.

== Career statistics ==
=== Club ===
As of 8 November 2026

Appearances and goals by club, season, and competition
Club	Season	League			Cup		Continental		Other		Total	
Club	Season	Division	Apps	Goals	Apps	Goals	Apps	Goals	Apps	Goals	Apps	Goals
Zhejiang FC	2023	Chinese Super League	4	0	1	0	3 (Note: Appearances in AFC Champions League)	0	–		8	0
Zhejiang FC	2024	Chinese Super League	11	0	2	0	6 (Note: Appearances in AFC Champions League Two)	1	–		19	1
Zhejiang FC	2025	Chinese Super League	28	11	2	1	–		–		30	12
Zhejiang FC	2026	Chinese Super League	29	9	1	0	–		–		30	9
Zhejiang FC	Total		72	20	6	1	9	1	0	0	87	22
Career total			72	20	6	1	9	1	0	0	87	22

=== International ===
As of 14 November 2026

Appearances and goals by national team and year
National team	Year	Apps	Goals
China	2025	6	1
China	2026	6	1
Total		12	2

Scores and results list China's goal tally first, score column indicates score after each Wang Yudong goal.

List of international goals scored by Wang Yudong
No.	Date	Venue	Opponent	Score	Result	Competition
1	10 June 2025	Longxing Football Stadium, Chongqing, China	Bahrain	1–0	1–0	2026 FIFA World Cup qualification
2	14 November 2026	Zhaoqing New District Sports Center Stadium, Guangdong, China	Malaysia	1–0	2–0	Friendly

== Honours ==
China U23

- AFC U-23 Asian Cup runner-up: 2026

Individual

- Chinese Golden Boy (U17): 2023
