= Alimardon Shukurov =

Kyrgyz footballer (born 1999)

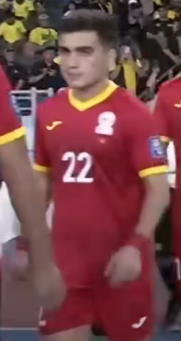

Personal information
- Full name: Alimardon Abitalipovich Shukurov
- Date of birth: 28 September 1999 (age 27)
- Place of birth: Kengesh, Kyrgyzstan
- Height: 1.68 m (5 ft 6 in)
- Position: Midfielder

Team information
- Current team: Muras United
- Number: 22

Senior career*
Years	Team	Apps	(Gls)
2017–2019	Abdysh-Ata Kant	6	(1)
2019–2020	Boluspor	4	(0)
2021–2023	Neman Grodno	73	(6)
2024–2025	Torpedo-BelAZ Zhodino	39	(4)
2026–	Muras United	0	(0)

International career^{‡}
2017–	Kyrgyzstan	39	(8)
- * Club domestic league appearances and goals as of 3 April 2026 ‡ National team caps and goals as of 4 October 2026

Alimardon Abitalipovich Shukurov (Kyrgyz: Алимардон Шүкүров; Russian: Алимардон Абиталипович Шукуров; born 28 September 1999) is a Kyrgyz professional footballer who plays as a midfielder for Muras United and the Kyrgyzstan national team.

== Career statistics ==
=== International ===
As of match played 4 October 2026

Appearances and goals by national team and year
National team	Year	Apps	Goals
Kyrgyzstan	2017	1	0
Kyrgyzstan	2018	0	0
Kyrgyzstan	2019	6	2
Kyrgyzstan	2020	0	0
Kyrgyzstan	2021	6	2
Kyrgyzstan	2022	6	1
Kyrgyzstan	2023	9	0
Kyrgyzstan	2024	8	1
Kyrgyzstan	2025	1	0
Kyrgyzstan	2026	2	1
Total		39	8

Scores and results list Kyrgyzstan's goal tally first, score column indicates score after each Shukurov goal.

List of international goals scored by Alimardon Shukurov
No.	Date	Venue	Opponent	Score	Result	Competition
1	10 October 2019	Dolen Omurzakov Stadium, Bishkek, Kyrgyzstan	Myanmar	3–0	7–0	2022 FIFA World Cup qualification
2	10 October 2019	Dolen Omurzakov Stadium, Bishkek, Kyrgyzstan	Myanmar	6–0	7–0	2022 FIFA World Cup qualification
3	11 June 2021	Yanmar Stadium Nagai, Osaka, Japan	Myanmar	4–0	8–1	2022 FIFA World Cup qualification
4	7 September 2021	Dolen Omurzakov Stadium, Bishkek, Kyrgyzstan	Bangladesh	2–0	4–1	Friendly
5	24 September 2022	Dolen Omurzakov Stadium, Bishkek, Kyrgyzstan	Russia	1–0	1–2	Friendly
6	10 October 2024	Al Thumama Stadium, Doha, Qatar	Qatar	1–2	1–3	2026 FIFA World Cup qualification
7	25 March 2025	Dolen Omurzakov Stadium, Bishkek, Kyrgyzstan	Qatar	3–1	3–1	2026 FIFA World Cup qualification
8	4 October 2026	Dolen Omurzakov Stadium, Bishkek, Kyrgyzstan	Lebanon	2–0	3–1	Friendly
