= 2026 Casper Cup =

International football tournament

Giải bóng đá giao hữu quốc tế – Casper Cup 2026

Tournament details
- Host country: Vietnam
- City: Ninh Bình
- Dates: 11–17 November
- Teams: 3 (from 3 sub-confederations)

Final positions
- Champions: Kyrgyzstan (1st title)
- Runners-up: Vietnam
- Third place: Chinese Taipei

Tournament statistics
- Matches played: 3
- Goals scored: 8 (2.67 per match)
- Top scorer(s): (Vietnam) Nguyễn Đình Bắc (2 goal)

The 2026 International Friendly Football Tournament – Casper Cup 2026 (Vietnamese: Giải bóng đá giao hữu quốc tế – Casper Cup 2026), was the 13th edition of the VFF Cup, the international men's football tournament organized by the Vietnam Football Federation. It was played between 11 and 17 November 2026, featuring three teams, with all matches are held at Thiên Trường Stadium in Ninh Bình province.

== Participating nations ==
Host Vietnam invited Chinese Taipei and Kyrgyzstan to participate in the tournament, as preparations for the 2027 AFC Asian Cup.

FIFA Rankings, as of 7 October 2026

Nation	Sub-confederation	FIFA ranking (October 2026)
Vietnam (hosts)	AFF	99
Chinese Taipei	EAFF	176
Kyrgyzstan	CAFA	104

== Table ==
Pos	Team	Pld	W	D	L	GF	GA	GD	Pts	
1	Kyrgyzstan	2	2	0	0	5	1	+4	6	Champions
2	Vietnam (H)	2	1	0	1	3	2	+1	3	Runners-up
3	Chinese Taipei	2	0	0	2	0	5	−5	0	Third place

Source: VFF
(H) Hosts

== Matches ==
11 November 2026
19:00

Vietnam	2–0	Chinese Taipei
Olaha Mạnh Đức 21'; Nguyễn Đình Bắc 58'	Report

Thiên Trường Stadium, Ninh Bình
Attendance: 2,148
Referee: Nawal Zubir (Malaysia)
14 November 2026
19:00

Chinese Taipei	0–3	Kyrgyzstan
	Report	Zhyrgalbek uulu 31'; Kojo 44'; Akmatov 90+1'

Thiên Trường Stadium, Ninh Bình
Referee: Hoàng Ngọc Hà (Vietnam)
17 November 2026
19:00

Kyrgyzstan	2–1	Vietnam
Kichin 86'; Atabayev 88'	Report	Nguyễn Đình Bắc 19'

Thiên Trường Stadium, Ninh Bình
Attendance: 5,102
Referee: Nawal Zubir (Malaysia)

== Goalscorers ==
There were 8 goals scored in 3 matches, for an average of 2.67 goals per match.

2 goals

- (Vietnam) Nguyễn Đình Bắc

1 goal

- (Kyrgyzstan) Ayzar Akmatov
- (Kyrgyzstan) Erbol Atabayev
- (Kyrgyzstan) Valery Kichin
- (Kyrgyzstan) Joel Kojo
- (Kyrgyzstan) Kayrat Zhyrgalbek uulu
- (Vietnam) Olaha Mạnh Đức

== See also ==
- 2026 Gia Lai U-23 VTV Cup
