= Valery Kichin =

Kyrgyz-Russian footballer

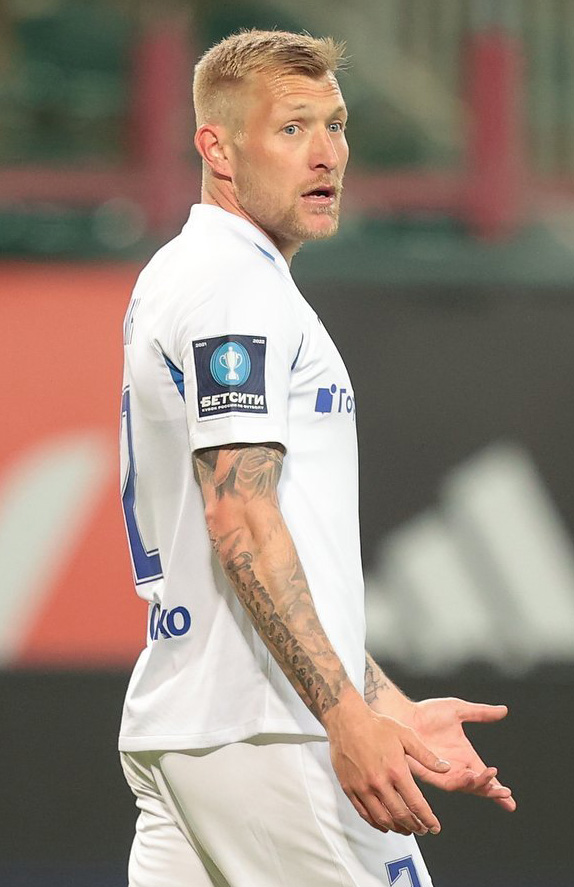
- Kichin with Yenisey Krasnoyarsk in 2022

Personal information
- Full name: Valery Sergeyevich Kichin
- Date of birth: 12 October 1992 (age 34)
- Place of birth: Bishkek, Kyrgyzstan
- Height: 1.84 m (6 ft 0 in)
- Positions: Left-back; centre-back

Team information
- Current team: Bars Issyk-Kul
- Number: 2

Youth career
- RSDYuShOR Bishkek
- Kambar-Ata Bishkek
- –2007: Alga Bishkek

Senior career*
| Years | Team | Apps | (Gls) |
| 2008 | Abdysh-Ata-91 | | |
| 2009–2012 | Dordoi Bishkek | | |
| 2009–2011 | → Dordoi-2 Bishkek | | |
| 2013–2014 | Volga Nizhny Novgorod | 3 | (0) |
| 2013 | → Khimik Dzerzhinsk (loan) | 19 | (1) |
| 2014 | → Ufa (loan) | 5 | (0) |
| 2014–2015 | Anzhi Makhachkala | 12 | (0) |
| 2015 | → Tyumen (loan) | 11 | (0) |
| 2015–2016 | Tyumen | 33 | (1) |
| 2016–2019 | Yenisey Krasnoyarsk | 76 | (6) |
| 2019 | Dinamo Minsk | 12 | (0) |
| 2020 | Torpedo Moscow | 2 | (0) |
| 2020–2024 | Yenisey Krasnoyarsk | 110 | (17) |
| 2024 | Lokomotiv Tashkent | 13 | (3) |
| 2025– | Bars Issyk-Kul | 16 | (0) |

International career^{‡}
| 2012–2013 | Kyrgyzstan U20 | 12 | (3) |
| 2014 | Kyrgyzstan U23 | 2 | (0) |
| 2011– | Kyrgyzstan | 65 | (7) |
- * Club domestic league appearances and goals as of 14 August 2025 ‡ National team caps and goals as of 17 November 2026

Valery Sergeyevich Kichin (Russian: Валерий Сергеевич Кичин; born 12 October 1992) is a Russian-Kyrgyz professional footballer who plays as a left back or centre back for Bars Issyk-Kul, and captains the Kyrgyzstan national football team.

== Club career ==
=== Volga Nizhny Novgorod ===
On 27 February 2013, Kichin signed a long-term contract with Volga Nizhny Novgorod.

=== Anzhi Makhachkala ===
On 2 July 2014, Kichin signed a three-year contract with Russian club, Anzhi Makhachkala.

==== Loan to Tyumen ====
Kichen then moved to Tyumen on loan in January 2015. After returning to Anzhi at the end of the 2014–15 season, Kichin's contract with Anzhi was terminated by mutual consent on 30 June 2015.

=== Dinamo Minsk ===
Kichin joined Belarusian club Dinamo Minsk in July 2019, where he played until February 2020.

=== Torpedo Moscow ===
On 17 February 2020, Kichin signed with Russian Football National League club, Torpedo Moscow until the end of the 2019–20 season.

=== Yenisey Krasnoyarsk ===
After his contract ended at Torpedo Moscow, Kichin signed with Yenisey Krasnoyarsk.

=== Lokomotiv Tashkent ===
On 6 July 2024, Uzbekistan Super League club Lokomotiv Tashkent announced the signing of Kichin.

== International career ==
Kichin has been a member of the Kyrgyzstan national team since 2011. He captained the team at the 2019 AFC Asian Cup.

== Personal life ==
He is an Orthodox Christian. He is a citizen of Russia since 19.

== Career statistics ==
As of match played 17 November 2026

Appearances and goals by national team and year
| National team | Year | Apps | Goals |
|---|---|---|---|
| Kyrgyzstan | 2011 | 1 | 0 |
| Kyrgyzstan | 2012 | 0 | 0 |
| Kyrgyzstan | 2013 | 6 | 0 |
| Kyrgyzstan | 2014 | 6 | 0 |
| Kyrgyzstan | 2015 | 6 | 0 |
| Kyrgyzstan | 2016 | 3 | 1 |
| Kyrgyzstan | 2017 | 2 | 0 |
| Kyrgyzstan | 2018 | 2 | 0 |
| Kyrgyzstan | 2019 | 8 | 1 |
| Kyrgyzstan | 2020 | 0 | 0 |
| Kyrgyzstan | 2021 | 2 | 1 |
| Kyrgyzstan | 2022 | 5 | 1 |
| Kyrgyzstan | 2023 | 2 | 0 |
| Kyrgyzstan | 2024 | 9 | 1 |
| Kyrgyzstan | 2025 | 7 | 1 |
| Kyrgyzstan | 2026 | 6 | 1 |
| Total | | 65 | 7 |

Scores and results list Kyrgyzstan's goal tally first, score column indicates score after each Kichin goal.

List of international goals scored by Valery Kichin
| No. | Date | Venue | Opponent | Score | Result | Competition |
|---|---|---|---|---|---|---|
| 1 | 30 August 2016 | Dolen Omurzakov Stadium, Bishkek, Kyrgyzstan | Kazakhstan | 1–0 | 2–0 | Friendly |
| 2 | 10 October 2019 | Dolen Omurzakov Stadium, Bishkek, Kyrgyzstan | Myanmar | 5–0 | 7–0 | 2022 FIFA World Cup qualification |
| 3 | 16 November 2021 | Bahrain National Stadium, Riffa, Bahrain | Bahrain | 1–0 | 2–4 | Friendly |
| 4 | 8 June 2022 | Dolen Omurzakov Stadium, Bishkek, Kyrgyzstan | Singapore | 1–1 | 2–1 | 2023 AFC Asian Cup qualification |
| 5 | 21 March 2024 | Nanzih Football Stadium, Kaohsiung, Taiwan | Chinese Taipei | 1–0 | 2–0 | 2026 FIFA World Cup qualification |
| 6 | 25 March 2025 | Dolen Omurzakov Stadium, Bishkek, Kyrgyzstan | Qatar | 1–0 | 3–1 | 2026 FIFA World Cup qualification |
| 7 | 17 November 2026 | Thiên Trường Stadium, Ninh Bình, Vietnam | Vietnam | 1–1 | 2–1 | 2026 Casper Cup |

== Honours ==
Dordoi Bishkek

- Shoro Top League: 2011, 2012
- Kyrgyzstan Cup: 2012
