= Ibrahim Al-Hassan =

Qatari footballer (born 2005)

Personal information
- Full name: Ibrahim Mohammed Al-Hassan Ibrahim Mohammed Ali
- Date of birth: 26 October 2005 (age 21)
- Place of birth: Sudan
- Position: Attacking midfielder

Team information
- Current team: Al-Rayyan
- Number: 18

Youth career
- –2023: Al-Rayyan Youth

Senior career*
Years	Team	Apps	(Gls)
2023–	Al-Rayyan	8	(0)
2024–2025	→ Calahorra (loan)	0	(0)
2024–2025	→ Calahorra B (loan)	0	(0)

International career^{‡}
2022–2025	Qatar U20	11	(3)
2024–	Qatar	12	(2)
- * Club domestic league appearances and goals as of 23:59, 8 April 2026 (UTC) ‡ National team caps and goals as of 17 November 2026

Ibrahim Mohammed Al-Hassan Ibrahim Mohammed Ali (Arabic: إِبْرَاهِيم مُحَمَّد الْحَسَن إِبْرَاهِيم مُحَمَّد عَلِيّ; born 26 October 2005) is a professional footballer who plays as an attacking midfielder for Al-Rayyan. Born in Sudan, he represents the Qatar national team.

== Club career ==
=== Al-Rayyan ===
Ibrahim Al-Hassan, who was born in Sudan on 26 October 2005, came through the youth academy of Al-Rayyan, and he joined the senior team on 1 July 2023 at the age of 17. He was part of the Al-Rayyan team that finished in second place during the 2023–24 Qatar Stars League.

Al-Hassan made his senior league debut for Al-Rayyan as a substitute during a 3–4 away win against Al-Shamal on 2 August 2023, and he made his first league start for Al-Rayyan during a 1–0 win against Al-Arabi on 23 August 2023.

He made one appearance for Al-Rayyan during the 2024–25 Qatar Stars League season before leaving the club on loan. He returned to Al-Rayyan to undergo surgery for his injury sustained while playing for Qatar U20, and was a substitute on 8 April 2026 during the 3–0 victory against Umm Salal.

=== Calahorra and Calahorra B (loan) ===
During the 2024–25 season, Al-Hassan was loaned to Tercera Federación club Calahorra B but did not make any appearances for the senior team.

== International career ==
Ibrahim Al-Hassan holds the nationalities of both Sudan and Qatar, and he decided to declare for the national team of the latter.

=== Youth career ===
He made five appearances for Qatar U20, two of which came during the 2023 AFC U-20 Asian Cup group stage.

He made his debut for Qatar U20 during AFC U-20 Asian Cup qualification during a 3–1 away victory against Nepal U20 on 12 September 2022.

Al-Hassan returned to the Qatar U20 team during 2025 AFC U-20 Asian Cup qualification in September 2024, scoring one goal in all three of Qatar U20's matches (with his first goal coming in a 3–0 win against Singapore U20 on 25 September 2024) as they qualified for the final tournament.

He would then feature during all three of their matches at the final tournament as Qatar U20 were eliminated during the group stage. On 18 March 2025, during the 1–1 friendly draw against Egypt U20, he injured his anterior cruciate ligament.

=== Senior career ===
He was first included in the squad for the senior team in July 2024. He then made his debut for the senior Qatar team during a 0–0 draw against Afghanistan during a qualification match for the 2026 FIFA World Cup on 6 July 2024.

He scored his first international goal during a 3–1 home loss against the United Arab Emirates in a 2026 FIFA World Cup qualifying match on 5 September 2024 and he got his first international yellow card on 10 September 2024 during a 2–2 draw against North Korea.

He was included in the Qatari squad and played during the 26th Arabian Gulf Cup in December 2024.

== Career statistics ==
=== Club ===
As of match played 8 April 2026

Club	Season	League			National cup (Note: Includes Copa del Rey, Emir of Qatar Cup, Qatar Crown Prince Cup)		League cup (Note: Includes Copa Federación, Sheikh Jassim Cup, Qatari Stars Cup)		Europe and Asia		Other		Total	
Club	Season	Division	Apps	Goals	Apps	Goals	Apps	Goals	Apps	Goals	Apps	Goals	Apps	Goals
Al-Rayyan	2023–24	Qatar Stars League	6	0	0	0	0	0	0	0	—		6	0
Al-Rayyan	2024–25	Qatar Stars League	1	0	0	0	0	0	0	0	—		1	0
Al-Rayyan	2025–26	Qatar Stars League	1	0	0	0	0	0	0	0	—		1	0
Calahorra (loan)	2024–25	Tercera Federación	0	0	—		—		—		—		0	0
Calahorra B (loan)	2024–25	Tercera Federación	0	0	—		—		—		—		0	0
Career total			8	0	0	0	0	0	0	0	—		8	0

=== International ===
As of match played 17 November 2026

Appearances and goals by national team and year
National team	Year	Apps	Goals
Qatar	2024	11	2
Qatar	2025	0	0
Qatar	2026	1	0
Total		12	2

As of match played 15 October 2024
Qatar score listed first, score column indicates score after each Al-Hassan goal

List of international goals scored by Ibrahim Al-Hassan
No.	Date	Venue	Cap	Opponent	Score	Result	Competition	Ref.
1	5 September 2024	Ahmad bin Ali Stadium, Al Rayyan, Qatar	3	United Arab Emirates	1–0	1–3	2026 FIFA World Cup qualification	
2	10 October 2024	Al Thumama Stadium, Doha, Qatar	5	Kyrgyzstan	3–1	3–1	2026 FIFA World Cup qualification	

== Honours ==
Al-Rayyan

- Qatar Stars League runner-up: 2023–24, 2025–26
- Qatar Cup runner-up: 2024
