= Kang Kuk-chol =

North Korean footballer (born 1999)

Personal information
- Full name: Kang Kuk-chol
- Date of birth: 29 September 1999 (age 27)
- Place of birth: Pyongyang, North Korea
- Height: 1.76 m (5 ft 9 in)
- Positions: Left-back; winger

Team information
- Current team: Rimyongsu
- Number: 6

Senior career*
Years	Team	Apps	(Gls)
2016–	Rimyongsu		

International career^{‡}
2016–2018	North Korea U19	6	(2)
2018–2023	North Korea U23	18	(2)
2016–	North Korea	26	(1)
- * Club domestic league appearances and goals ‡ National team caps and goals as of 17 February 2025

Kang Kuk-chol (Korean: 강국철; born 19 September 1999) is a North Korean professional footballer who plays as a left-back or winger for DPR Korea Premier League club Rimyongsu and the North Korea national football team.

== Club career ==
Kang had been playing for Rimyongsu since 2016.

== International career ==
=== Youth ===
With North Korea under-23, Kang featured in the AFC U-23 Championship in 2018 and 2020 and scored 1 goal in the 2020 edition from a long-range free kick against Vietnam.

In September 2023, Kang was called up to North Korea Olympic squad for the 2022 Asian Games in China. He scored a goal in the round of 16 against Bahrain to qualify his team to the quarter-finals, where they got eliminated.

=== Senior ===
In 2016, Kang made his debut with the North Korea national team. Later, he was named in North Korea's final 23-men squad for the 2019 AFC Asian Cup, being the youngest member of the team.

== Career statistics ==
=== International ===
No.	Date	Venue	Opponent	Score	Result	Competition
1.	10 September 2024	New Laos National Stadium, Vientiane, Laos	Qatar	2–2	2–2	2026 FIFA World Cup qualification
