= Aleksandr Mishchenko =

Kyrgyzstani association football player

Personal information
- Full name: Aleksandr Grigoryevich Mishchenko
- Date of birth: 30 July 1997 (age 29)
- Place of birth: Ivanovka, Kyrgyzstan
- Height: 1.76 m (5 ft 9 in)
- Position: Defender

Team information
- Current team: Dordoi Bishkek
- Number: 31

Youth career
- 2006–2010: TSC Euskirchen
- 2010–2012: Bonner SC
- 2012–2013: TSC Euskirchen
- 2013–2016: Borussia Mönchengladbach

Senior career*
Years	Team	Apps	(Gls)
2016–2017	TSV Hertha Walheim		
2017–	Dordoi Bishkek		

International career^{‡}
2019–2025	Kyrgyzstan	33	(1)
- * Club domestic league appearances and goals as of 23 August 2019 ‡ National team caps and goals as of 5 September 2025

Aleksandr Grigoryevich Mishchenko (Russian: Александр Григорьевич Мищенко; born 30 July 1997) is a Kyrgyzstani footballer who plays as a defender for Kyrgyzstan League club Dordoi Bishkek.

== Career ==
=== Club ===
On 3 May 2023, Mishchenko made his 150th appearance for Dordoi Bishkek.

=== International ===
Mishchenko made his debut for Kyrgyzstan national football team in a friendly match on 11 June 2019 against Palestine.

== Career statistics ==
=== International ===
As of match played 5 September 2025

Appearances and goals by national team and year
National team	Year	Apps	Goals
Kyrgyzstan	2019	3	0
Kyrgyzstan	2020	–	
Kyrgyzstan	2021	3	0
Kyrgyzstan	2022	6	0
Kyrgyzstan	2023	3	0
Kyrgyzstan	2024	11	0
Kyrgyzstan	2025	7	1
Total		33	1

Scores and results list Kyrgyzstan's goal tally first, score column indicates score after each Mishchenko goal.

List of international goals scored by Aleksandr Mishchenko
No.	Date	Venue	Opponent	Score	Result	Competition
6	25 March 2025	Dolen Omurzakov Stadium, Bishkek, Kyrgyzstan	Qatar	2–1	3–1	2026 FIFA World Cup qualification

== Honours ==
Dordoi Bishkek

- Kyrgyz Premier League: 2018, 2019, 2020, 2021
- Kyrgyzstan Cup: 2017, 2018
- Kyrgyzstan Super Cup: 2019, 2021
