= Ahmed Al-Rawi =

Qatari footballer (born 2004)

Personal information
- Full name: Ahmed Hisham Ali Musa Al-Rawi
- Date of birth: 30 May 2004 (age 22)
- Place of birth: Baghdad, Iraq
- Height: 1.84 m (6 ft 0 in)
- Position: Striker

Team information
- Current team: Qatar (on loan from Al-Rayyan)
- Number: 10

Youth career
- –2018: Aspire Academy
- 2018–2021: Al-Rayyan

Senior career*
| Years | Team | Apps | (Gls) |
| 2021– | Al-Rayyan | 24 | (4) |
| 2022–2023 | → Alcorcón C (loan) | | |
| 2025– | → Qatar (loan) | 0 | (0) |

International career^{‡}
| 2022–2023 | Qatar U20 | 8 | (4) |
| 2023– | Qatar U23 | 7 | (3) |
| 2023– | Qatar | 7 | (2) |
- * Club domestic league appearances and goals as of 21 March 2024 ‡ National team caps and goals as of 27 December 2024

Ahmed Hisham Ali Musa Al-Rawi (Arabic: أَحْمَد هِشَام عَلِيّ مُوسَى الرَّاوِي; born 30 May 2004) is a professional footballer who plays as a striker for Qatari club Qatar, on loan from Al-Rayyan. Born in Iraq, he represents the Qatar national team.

== Early life ==
Al-Rawi was born in the Iraqi capital Baghdad to an Iraqi family originally from Rawah District, Al Anbar Governorate. His father Hisham Al-Rawi is a former footballer. He has two brothers, including Bassam who is a member of the Qatar national team. He moved with his family to Syria in 2006 and to Qatar in 2007.

== Club career ==
Al-Rawi was formed in the Aspire Academy. In 2018, he joined the youth department of Al-Rayyan. In 2021, he started playing in the club's senior team in the Qatar Stars League. He made four appearances during the 2022 AFC Champions League.

On 19 October 2022, he was loaned to Spanish side AD Alcorcón's second reserve team.

== International career ==
Born in Iraq, Al-Rawi was naturalized to represent Qatar in the international level. He took part in the 2023 AFC U-20 Asian Cup with the Qatar under-20s. He scored one goal during the tournament as Qatar finished at the bottom of the group and got eliminated.

On 16 November 2023, he made his international debut in Qatar's 8–1 2026 FIFA World Cup qualification win against Afghanistan. In June 2023, he took part in the Maurice Revello Tournament in France with Qatar. On 21 March 2024, he scored his first international goal in a 3–0 victory over Kuwait during the 2026 FIFA World Cup qualification. On 11 June, he scored his second goal against India in their 2–1 win.

== Career statistics ==
=== International goals ===
| No. | Date | Venue | Opponent | Score | Result | Competition |
|---|---|---|---|---|---|---|
| 1. | 21 March 2024 | Jassim bin Hamad Stadium, Al Rayyan, Qatar | Kuwait | 2–0 | 3–0 | 2026 FIFA World Cup qualification |
| 2. | 11 June 2024 | Jassim bin Hamad Stadium, Al Rayyan, Qatar | India | 2–1 | 2–1 | 2026 FIFA World Cup qualification |
| 3. | 20 March 2025 | Jassim bin Hamad Stadium, Al Rayyan, Qatar | North Korea | 4–0 | 5–1 | 2026 FIFA World Cup qualification |
