= Kengesh, Chüy =

Kengesh
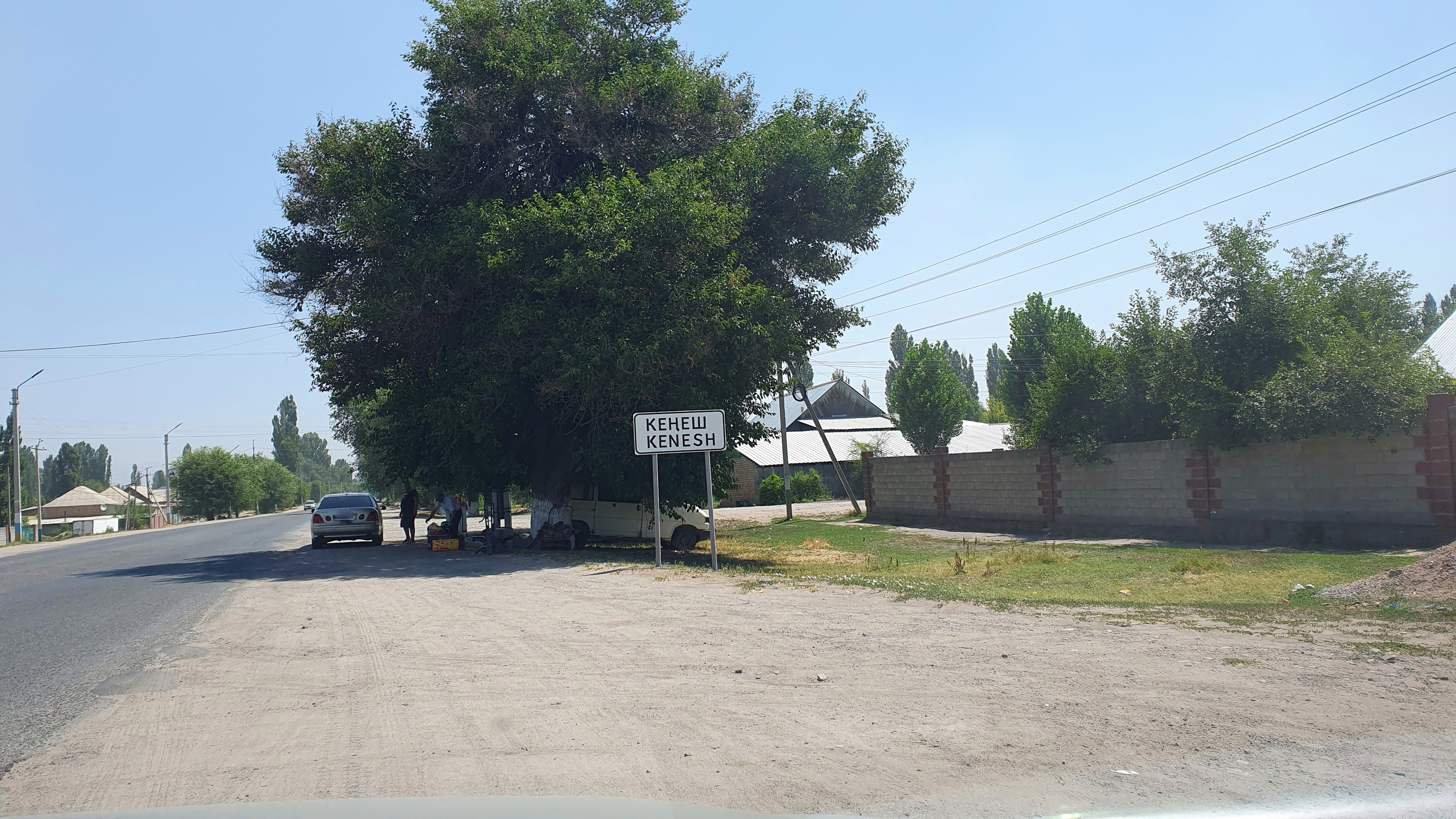

- Location within Kyrgyzstan
- Coordinates: 42°53′38″N 74°56′04″E
- Country: Kyrgyzstan
- Region: Chüy Region
- District: Ysyk-Ata District
- Elevation: 740 m (2,430 ft)

Population (2021)
  - Total: 2,927

Kengesh is a village in the Ysyk-Ata District of Chüy Region of Kyrgyzstan. Its population was 2,927 in 2021. It was established in 1929.
