= Xie Wenneng =

Chinese footballer (born 2001)

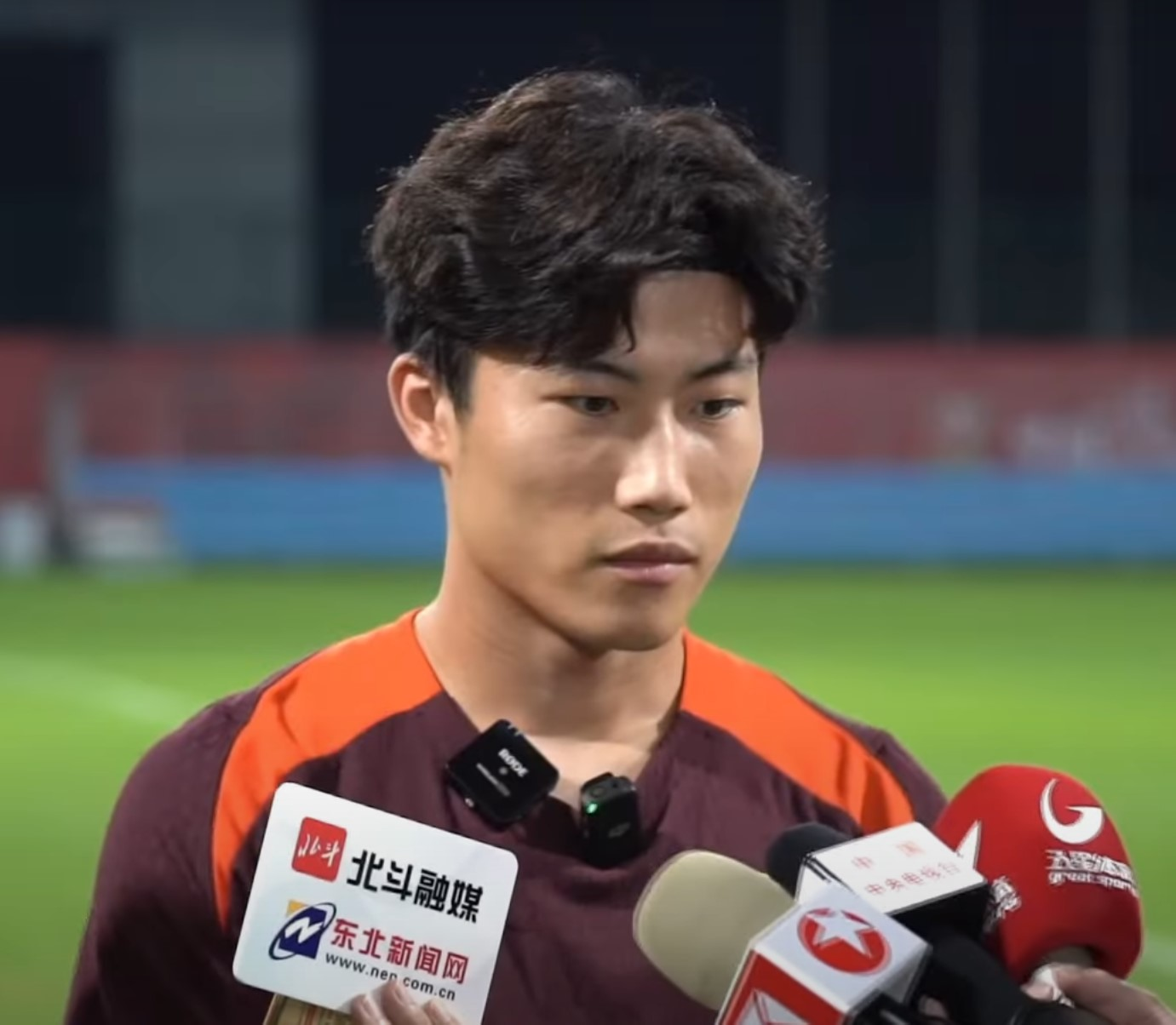
- Xie Wenneng in September 2024

Personal information
- Full name: Xie Wenneng
- Date of birth: 6 February 2001 (age 25)
- Place of birth: Meizhou, Guangdong, China
- Height: 1.74 m (5 ft 9 in)
- Position: Winger

Team information
- Current team: Shandong Taishan
- Number: 7

Youth career
- –2020: Shandong Taishan
- 2018: → Desportivo Brasil (loan)

Senior career*
Years	Team	Apps	(Gls)
2020–	Shandong Taishan	81	(15)
2020	→ Zibo Cuju (loan)	11	(1)
2021	→ China U20 (loan)	10	(2)
2021	→ Qingdao Hainiu (loan)	14	(7)
2022	→ Qingdao Hainiu (loan)	32	(10)

International career^{‡}
2023–2024	China U23	7	(1)
2024–	China	20	(1)
Medal record
Representing China
Men's football
EAFF Championship
Bronze medal – third place	2025 South Korea	Team
- * Club domestic league appearances and goals as of 19 November 2026 ‡ National team caps and goals as of 22 November 2025

Xie Wenneng (simplified Chinese: 谢文能; traditional Chinese: 謝文能; pinyin: Xiè Wénnéng; born 6 February 2001) is a Chinese professional footballer who plays as a winger for Chinese Super League club Shandong Taishan and the China national team.

== Club career ==
=== Early career ===
Born in Meizhou, Guangdong, Xie started his football career with Shandong Taishan, where he was a part of youth side which won a Chinese U-16 League title in 2017, and was selected as a candidate for the 2017 Golden Boy at the under-16 level.

=== Shandong Taishan ===
==== Zibo Cuju loan ====
On 20 October 2020, Xie Wenneng was loaned out to China League Two side Zibo Cuju on a short-term deal. He made his professional debut on 24 October 2020 in a game against Hubei Chufeng United, as he started in the game for Zibo Cuju. On 5 December 2020, Xie scored his first senior goal as he helped Zibo Cuju secure a 2–0 victory over Nanjing Fengfan.

==== China U20 loan ====
On 9 May 2021, Xie was called up to the China U20 football team to compete in the 2021 China League Two. On 21 May 2021, Xie was responsible for both goals in a 2–1 win over newly promoted Dongguan United.

==== Qingdao Hainiu loan ====
On 29 August 2021, China League Two club Qingdao Hainiu announced the loan signing of Xie from Shandong Taishan. He scored his first goal for the club on 11 September 2021 as he produced the winner against Shanghai Jiading Huilong in a 1–0 victory. He went on to score six more goals for the club before returning to his parent club, including a brace on the final day on 22 November against Guangxi Pingguo Haliao in a 2–2 draw, which saw Qingdao Hainiu lift the 2021 China League Two title, winning promotion to China League One.

==== Second Qingdao Hainiu loan ====
On 3 May 2022, Xie went out on loan to Qingdao Hainiu for a second season, and Xie's first season in China League One in his career. He would experience his breakthrough season in China League One as he provided 10 goals in 32 league appearances for Qingdao Hainiu, and helped the club secure back-to-back promotion, this time to the Chinese Super League, with a second-place finish.

==== Return from loan ====
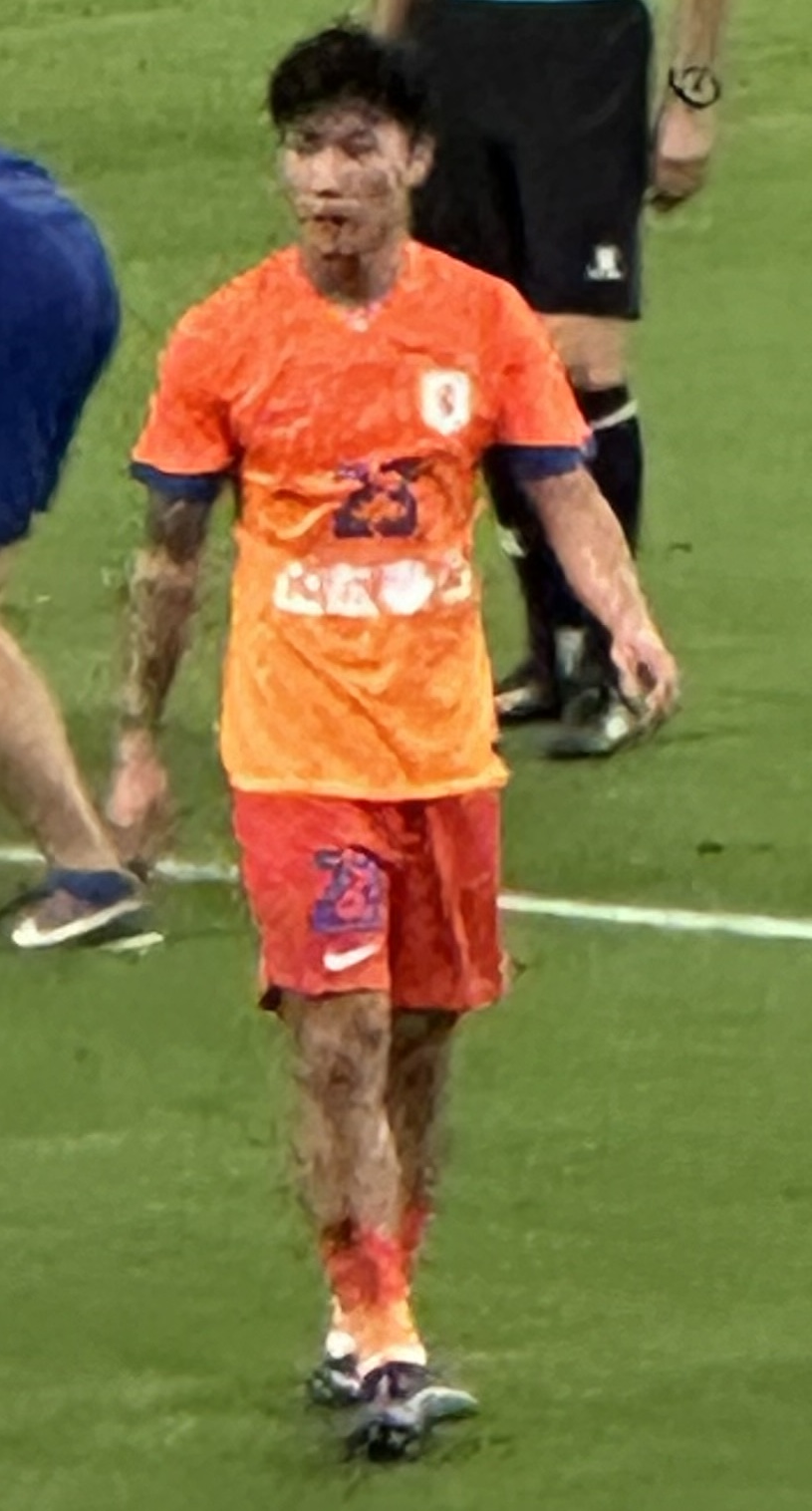
Xie Wenneng playing for Shandong Taishan in 2024

Xie was named in the first-team squad for Shandong Taishan ahead of the 2023 Chinese Super League season, but his appearances for the majority of the season were largely limited by national training camps abroad which saw Xie out for club football for long periods of the season, only making two appearances in the 2023 Chinese FA Cup before August. On 4 August 2023, Xie made his Chinese Super League debut in a 6–1 home win over Meizhou Hakka, his hometown club, having scored against them a week earlier in a Chinese FA Cup tie. On 15 September 2023, Xie scored his first goals in the Chinese Super League as he scored twice in a 4–2 win over his former club Qingdao Hainiu. Xie made his AFC Champions League debut four days later on 19 September 2023 in a group stage match against Filipino side Kaya, scoring a goal that was ultimately ruled offside. Xie Wenneng finished the 2023 league campaign with 3 goals in 7 appearances.

== International career ==
Xie has been selected by China youth teams at the under-16, under-20 through the China League Two-participating side in 2021, under-21, and under-23 levels. In 2023, Xie was called up to an under-23 training camp in Croatia and Belgium; Xie scored in friendlies with NK Solin, Club NXT, and NK Zagora Unešić.

On 8 March 2024, Xie Wenneng received his first call-up for the senior national team, in preparation for two matches in the second round of 2026 FIFA World Cup qualifiers, both against Singapore. Xie made his debut on 6 June 2024 in a World Cup qualifier against Thailand. He substituted Xu Haoyang in the 68th minute as the game ended in a 1–1 draw.

On 10 October 2024, Xie scored his first international goal against Australia in a World Cup qualifying match, which eventually ended in a 3–1 defeat.

== Personal life ==
Xie married his wife on 2 January 2024.

== Career statistics ==
=== Club ===
As of 22 November 2025

Appearances and goals by club, season, and competition
Club	Season	League			Cup		Continental		Other		Total	
Club	Season	Division	Apps	Goals	Apps	Goals	Apps	Goals	Apps	Goals	Apps	Goals
Zibo Cuju (loan)	2020	China League Two	11	1	0	0	–		–		11	1
China U20 (loan)	2021	China League Two	10	2	3	2	–		–		13	4
Qingdao Hainiu (loan)	2021	China League Two	14	7	0	0	–		–		14	7
Qingdao Hainiu (loan)	2022	China League One	32	10	1	0	–		–		33	10
Shandong Taishan	2023	Chinese Super League	7	3	4	1	9 (Note: Appearances in AFC Champions League)	0	0 (Note: Appearances in Chinese FA Super Cup)	0	20	4
Shandong Taishan	2024	Chinese Super League	19	3	3	1	7 (Note: Appearances in AFC Champions League Elite)	0	–		30	4
Shandong Taishan	2025	Chinese Super League	29	4	2	0	1	0	–		32	4
Shandong Taishan	Total		55	10	9	2	17	0	0	0	81	12
Career total			122	30	13	4	17	0	0	0	152	34

=== International ===
As of 15 July 2025

Appearances and goals by national team and year
National team	Year	Apps	Goals
China	2024	7	1
China	2025	6	0
China	2026	7	0
Total		20	1

==== International goals ====
No.	Date	Venue	Opponent	Score	Result	Competition
1.	10 October 2024	Adelaide Oval, Adelaide, Australia	Australia	1–0	1–3	2026 FIFA World Cup qualification

== Honours ==
Qingdao Hainiu

- China League Two: 2021
