= Lucas Mendes (footballer, born 1990) =

Qatari footballer

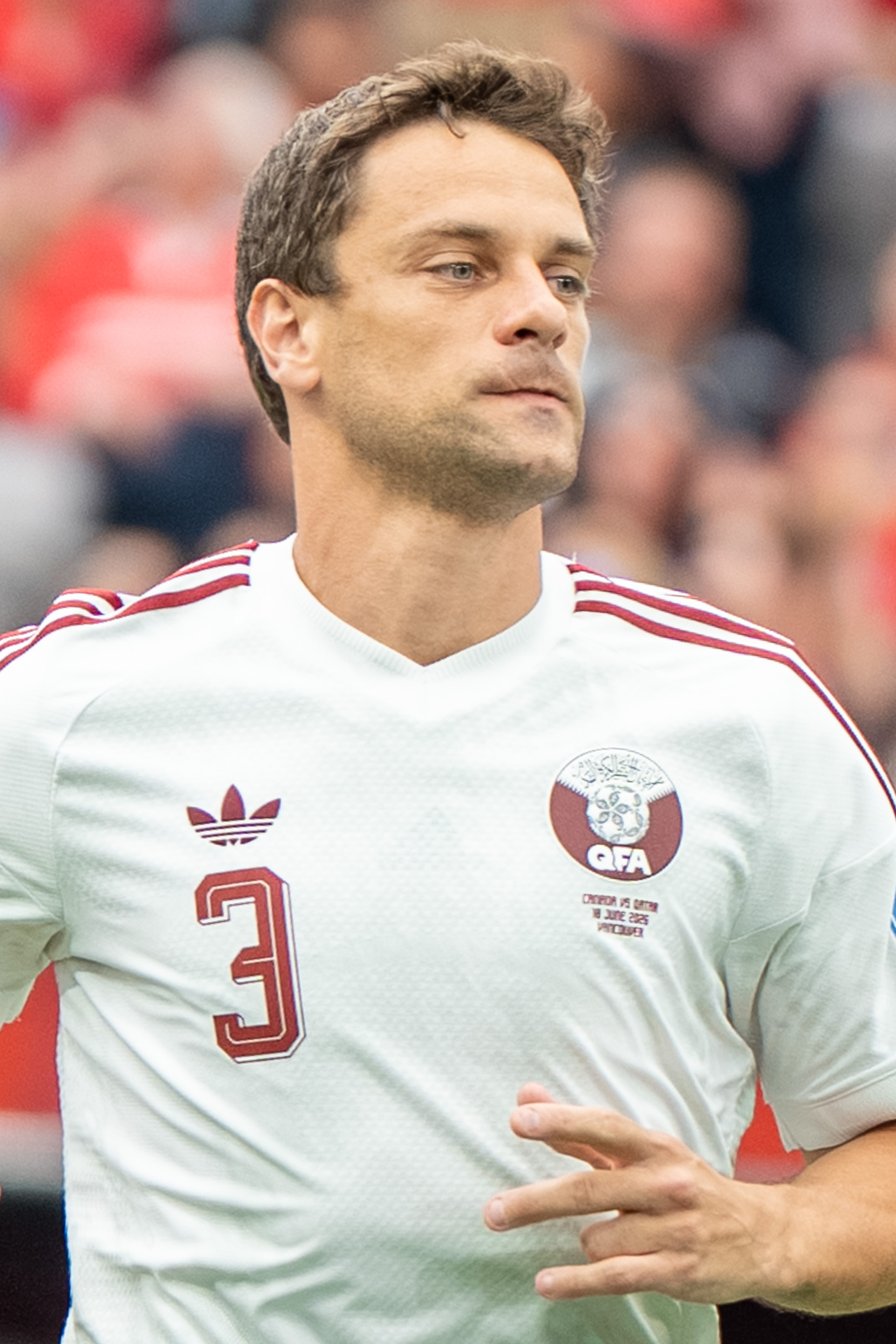
- Mendes with Qatar in 2026

Personal information
- Full name: Lucas Michel Mendes
- Date of birth: 3 July 1990 (age 36)
- Place of birth: Curitiba, Brazil
- Height: 1.84 m (6 ft 0 in)
- Positions: Left-back; centre-back

Team information
- Current team: Al-Wakrah
- Number: 2

Youth career
- 2006–2008: Coritiba

Senior career*
Years	Team	Apps	(Gls)
2008–2012	Coritiba	139	(2)
2012–2014	Marseille	48	(2)
2014–2017	El Jaish	63	(5)
2017–2019	Al-Duhail	29	(0)
2019–2020	Al-Gharafa	7	(1)
2020–	Al-Wakrah	113	(3)

International career^{‡}
2023–	Qatar	22	(2)
Medal record
Representing Qatar
Men's Football
AFC Asian Cup
Winner	2023 Qatar
- * Club domestic league appearances and goals as of 21 November 2025 ‡ National team caps and goals as of 17 November 2025

Lucas Michel Mendes (born 3 July 1990) is a professional footballer who plays as a centre-back or left-back for Qatari club Al-Wakrah. Born in Brazil, he plays for the Qatar national team.

== Club career ==
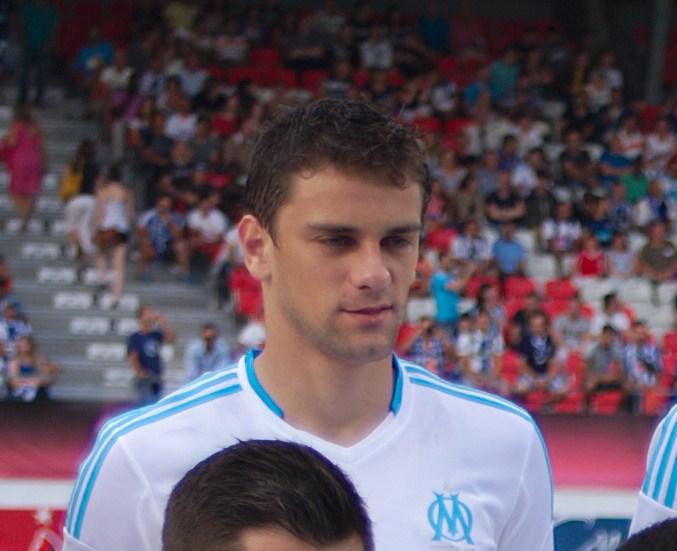
Mendes with Marseille in 2013

On 15 August 2014, after playing 2 years with Olympique de Marseille, he signed for Qatari club El Jaish.

== International career ==
On 9 November 2023, Mendes received his first call-up to the Qatar national team after being naturalized as a Qatari citizen, having lived in Qatar for nine years. He was part of the Qatari squad which won the 2023 AFC Asian Cup.

He scored his first goal in the third round of the 2026 FIFA World Cup Qualification in the 102nd minute of the match against the national team of Uzbekistan, ending Uzbekistan's unbeaten streak of 20 games.

He previously was part of Brazil Olympic team's preliminary list for the 2012 Summer Olympics, but did not make the final cut of 18 players who competed in that tournament.

== Career statistics ==
=== Club ===
As of 24 March 2024

Club	Division	Season	League		National Cup		National League Cup		Continental		Other		Total	
Club	Division	Season	Apps	Goals	Apps	Goals	Apps	Goals	Apps	Goals	Apps	Goals	Apps	Goals
Coritiba	Série A	2008	1	0	0	0	—		—		0	0	1	0
Coritiba	Série A	2009	0	0	0	0	—		—		0	0	0	0
Coritiba	Série B	2010	29	0	0	0	—		—		0	0	30	0
Coritiba	Série A	2011	24	0	11	0	—		—		11 (Note: Appearances in Campeonato Paranaense)	0	46	0
Coritiba	Série A	2012	13	2	9	0	—		2 (Note: Appearances in Copa Sudamericana)	0	20 (Note: Appearances in Campeonato Paranaense)	0	44	2
Coritiba	Total		67	2	20	0	0	0	2	0	31	0	120	2
Marseille	Ligue 1	2012–13	25	0	3	0	0	0	5 (Note: Appearances in UEFA Cup)	1	0	0	33	1
Marseille	Ligue 1	2013–14	22	2	0	0	2	0	4 (Note: Appearances in UEFA Champions League)	0	0	0	28	2
Marseille	Ligue 1	2014–15	1	0	0	0	0	0	0	0	0	0	1	0
Marseille	Total		48	2	3	0	2	0	9	1	0	0	62	3
El Jaish	QSL	2014–15	24	1	1	1	0	0	2 (Note: Appearances in AFC Champions League)	0	0	0	27	2
El Jaish	QSL	2015–16	19	1	1	0	0	0	8 (Note: Appearances in AFC Champions League)	0	0	0	28	1
El Jaish	QSL	2016–17	20	3	1	0	0	0	4 (Note: Appearances in AFC Champions League)	0	0	0	28	3
El Jaish	Total		63	5	3	1	0	0	14	0	0	0	80	6
Al-Duhail	QSL	2017–18	17	0	4	0	3	0	7 (Note: Appearances in AFC Champions League)	0	1 (Note: Appearances in Sheikh Jassim Cup)	0	32	0
Al-Duhail	QSL	2018–19	12	0	0	0	4	0	2 (Note: Appearances in AFC Champions League)	0	1 (Note: Appearances in Sheikh Jassim Cup)	0	19	0
Al-Duhail	Total		39	0	4	0	7	0	9	0	2	0	61	0
Al-Gharafa	QSL	2018–19	7	1	0	0	0	0	1 (Note: Appearances in AFC Champions League)	0	0	0	8	1
Al-Wakrah	QSL	2019–20	10	0	3	0	0	0	0	0	0	0	13	0
Al-Wakrah	QSL	2020–21	22	0	5	0	4	0	0	0	0	0	31	0
Al-Wakrah	QSL	2021–22	7	0	2	0	7	0	0	0	0	0	16	0
Al-Wakrah	QSL	2022–23	22	2	1	0	1	0	0	0	0	0	24	3
Al-Wakrah	QSL	2023–24	17	0	0	0	1	0	1 (Note: Appearances in AFC Champions League)	0	0	0	19	0
Al-Wakrah	Total		88	2	10	0	13	0	1	0	0	0	112	2
Career Total			270	9	40	1	22	0	36	1	33	0	401	11

=== International ===
As of match played 6 June 2025

Appearances and goals by national team and year
National team	Year	Apps	Goals
Qatar	2023	2	0
Qatar	2024	17	1
Qatar	2025	2	1
Total		21	2

List of international goals scored by Lucas Mendes
No.	Date	Venue	Opponent	Score	Result	Competition
1.	14 November 2024	Jassim bin Hamad Stadium, Doha, Qatar	Uzbekistan	3–2	3–2	2026 FIFA World Cup qualification
2.	25 March 2025	Dolen Omurzakov Stadium, Bishkek, Kyrgyzstan	Kyrgyzstan	1–1	1–3	2026 FIFA World Cup qualification

== Honours ==
Coritiba

- Campeonato Paranaense: 2008, 2010, 2011, 2012
- Campeonato Brasileiro Série B: 2010

Al-Duhail

- Qatar Stars League: 2017–18
- Emir of Qatar Cup: 2018, 2019
- Qatar Cup: 2018

Qatar

- AFC Asian Cup: 2023

Individual

- AFC Asian Cup Team of the Tournament: 2023
- Qatar Stars League Team of the Year: 2017–17, 2023–24
