= 2026 FIFA World Cup qualification – AFC third round =

International football competition

Tournament details
- Dates: 5 September 2024 – 10 June 2025
- Teams: 18 (from 1 confederation)

Tournament statistics
- Matches played: 90
- Goals scored: 231 (2.57 per match)
- Attendance: 2,581,626 (28,685 per match)
- Top scorer: 6 players (5 goals each)

The third round of AFC matches for the 2026 FIFA World Cup qualification was played from 5 September 2024 to 10 June 2025.

== Format ==
The 18 teams that advanced from the second round (nine group winners and nine group runners-up) were divided into three groups of six teams. The teams played against each other on a home-and-away basis. The top two teams of each group qualified directly for the 2026 FIFA World Cup, while the third and fourth-placed teams advanced to the fourth round.

== Qualified teams ==
The following teams finished first or second in their respective second round groups:

- Australia
- Bahrain
- China
- Indonesia
- Iran
- Iraq
- Japan
- Jordan
- Kuwait
- Kyrgyzstan
- North Korea
- Oman
- Palestine
- Qatar
- Saudi Arabia
- South Korea
- United Arab Emirates
- Uzbekistan

== Draw ==
The draw for the third round was held on 27 June 2024 in Kuala Lumpur, Malaysia.

The seeding for the draw was based on the FIFA Men's World Rankings on 20 June 2024 (shown in parentheses below).

Each group contained one team from each of the six pots. The draw started with Pot 6 and concluded with Pot 1, with each team drawn being placed in the corresponding position sequentially in Group A, then B, then C.

Pot 1	Pot 2	Pot 3
**Japan** (17); **Iran** (20); **South Korea** (22)	**Australia** (23); Qatar (35); Iraq (55)	Saudi Arabia (56); **Uzbekistan** (62); **Jordan** (68)
Pot 4	Pot 5	Pot 6
United Arab Emirates (69); Oman (76); Bahrain (81)	China (88); Palestine (95); Kyrgyzstan (101)	North Korea (110); Indonesia (134); Kuwait (137)

Note: Bold indicates team qualified for the World Cup. Italics indicates the team advanced to the fourth round.

== Schedule ==
The competition schedule was as follows:

Matchday	Date
Matchday 1	5 September 2024
Matchday 2	10 September 2024
Matchday 3	10 October 2024
Matchday 4	15 October 2024
Matchday 5	14–15 November 2024
Matchday 6	19 November 2024
Matchday 7	20 March 2025
Matchday 8	25 March 2025
Matchday 9	5 June 2025
Matchday 10	10 June 2025

== Group A ==
Pos	Team	Pld	W	D	L	GF	GA	GD	Pts	Qualification	(Iran)	(Uzbekistan)	(United Arab Emirates)	(Qatar)	(Kyrgyzstan)	(North Korea)
1	Iran	10	7	2	1	19	8	+11	23	2026 FIFA World Cup	—	2–2	2–0	4–1	1–0	3–0
2	Uzbekistan	10	6	3	1	14	7	+7	21	2026 FIFA World Cup	0–0	—	1–0	3–0	1–0	1–0
3	United Arab Emirates	10	4	3	3	15	8	+7	15	Fourth round	0–1	0–0	—	5–0	3–0	1–1
4	Qatar	10	4	1	5	17	24	−7	13	Fourth round	1–0	3–2	1–3	—	3–1	5–1
5	Kyrgyzstan	10	2	2	6	12	18	−6	8		2–3	2–3	1–1	3–1	—	1–0
6	North Korea	10	0	3	7	9	21	−12	3		2–3	0–1	1–2	2–2	2–2	—

Source: AFC, FIFA
Rules for classification: Tiebreakers
5 September 2024
19:00 UTC+5

Uzbekistan	1–0	North Korea
Masharipov 20'	Report (FIFA); Report (AFC)

Milliy Stadium, Tashkent
Attendance: 24,205
Referee: Ahmed Al-Kaf (Oman)
5 September 2024
19:30 UTC+3:30

Iran	1–0	Kyrgyzstan
Taremi 34'	Report (FIFA); Report (AFC)

Fuladshahr Stadium, Fuladshahr
Attendance: 12,077
Referee: Yusuke Araki (Japan)
5 September 2024
19:00 UTC+3

Qatar	1–3	United Arab Emirates
Al-Hassan 38'	Report (FIFA); Report (AFC)	Abdalla 68'; Ibrahim 80'; Saleh 90+4'

Ahmad bin Ali Stadium, Al Rayyan
Attendance: 33,952
Referee: Shaun Evans (Australia)

10 September 2024
19:00 UTC+7

North Korea	2–2	Qatar
Ri Il-song 19'; Kang Kuk-chol 52'	Report (FIFA); Report (AFC)	Afif 31' (pen.); Ali 44'

New Laos National Stadium, Vientiane (Laos) (Note: North Korea chose Vientiane, Laos, as their home site for their matches against Qatar, Iran and Uzbekistan due to "security concerns".)
Attendance: 140
Referee: Nazmi Nasaruddin (Malaysia)
10 September 2024
20:00 UTC+6

Kyrgyzstan	2–3	Uzbekistan
Kojo 15'; Abdurakhmanov 35'	Report (FIFA); Report (AFC)	Shomurodov 17'; Aliqulov 45'; Urunov 72'

Dolen Omurzakov Stadium, Bishkek
Attendance: 13,282
Referee: Ahmad Al-Ali (Kuwait)
10 September 2024
20:00 UTC+4

United Arab Emirates	0–1	Iran
	Report (FIFA); Report (AFC)	Ghayedi 45+3'

Hazza bin Zayed Stadium, Al Ain
Attendance: 17,826
Referee: Kim Jong-hyeok (South Korea)

10 October 2024
19:00 UTC+5

Uzbekistan	0–0	Iran
	Report (FIFA); Report (AFC)

Milliy Stadium, Tashkent
Attendance: 33,829
Referee: Shaun Evans (Australia)
10 October 2024
19:00 UTC+3

Qatar	3–1	Kyrgyzstan
Ali 39'; Kozubaev 63' (o.g.); Al-Hassan 81'	Report (FIFA); Report (AFC)	Shukurov 76'

Al Thumama Stadium, Doha
Attendance: 25,195
Referee: Muhammad Taqi (Singapore)
10 October 2024
20:00 UTC+4

United Arab Emirates	1–1	North Korea
Al-Ghassani 66'	Report (FIFA); Report (AFC)	Jong Il-gwan 86'

Hazza bin Zayed Stadium, Al Ain
Attendance: 8,536
Referee: Adham Makhadmeh (Jordan)

15 October 2024
19:00 UTC+5

Uzbekistan	1–0	United Arab Emirates
Shukurov 76' (pen.)	Report (FIFA); Report (AFC)

Milliy Stadium, Tashkent
Attendance: 32,773
Referee: Ma Ning (China)
15 October 2024
20:00 UTC+6

Kyrgyzstan	1–0	North Korea
Brauzman 11'	Report (FIFA); Report (AFC)

Dolen Omurzakov Stadium, Bishkek
Attendance: 9,769
Referee: Mohammed Al-Hoaish (Saudi Arabia)
15 October 2024
20:00 UTC+4

Iran	4–1	Qatar
Azmoun 42', 48'; Mo. Mohebi 65'; Ismaeel 90+8' (o.g.)	Report (FIFA); Report (AFC)	Ali 17'

Rashid Stadium, Dubai (United Arab Emirates) (Note: AFC moved the match to a neutral venue due to security concerns relating to the October 2024 Israeli strikes on Iran (Operation Days of Repentance).)
Attendance: 7,890
Referee: Yusuke Araki (Japan)

14 November 2024
19:00 UTC+7

North Korea	2–3	Iran
Taremi 56' (o.g.); Kim Yu-song 59'	Report (FIFA); Report (AFC)	Ghayedi 29'; Mo. Mohebi 41', 45'

New Laos National Stadium, Vientiane (Laos)
Attendance: 100
Referee: Sadullo Gulmurodi (Tajikistan)
14 November 2024
19:15 UTC+3

Qatar	3–2	Uzbekistan
Ali 25', 41'; Mendes 90+12'	Report (FIFA); Report (AFC)	Fayzullaev 75', 80'

Jassim bin Hamad Stadium, Al Rayyan
Attendance: 10,759
Referee: Kim Jong-hyeok (South Korea)
14 November 2024
20:15 UTC+4

United Arab Emirates	3–0	Kyrgyzstan
Abdalla 15', 89'; Meloni 35'	Report (FIFA); Report (AFC)

Mohammed bin Zayed Stadium, Abu Dhabi
Attendance: 6,238
Referee: Ahmed Al-Kaf (Oman)

19 November 2024
19:00 UTC+7

North Korea	0–1	Uzbekistan
	Report (FIFA); Report (AFC)	Fayzullaev 44'

New Laos National Stadium, Vientiane (Laos)
Attendance: 166
Referee: Ahmad Al-Ali (Kuwait)
19 November 2024
20:00 UTC+6

Kyrgyzstan	2–3	Iran
Kojo 51', 64' (pen.)	Report (FIFA); Report (AFC)	Taremi 12'; Hardani 33'; Azmoun 76'

Dolen Omurzakov Stadium, Bishkek
Attendance: 10,021
Referee: Ma Ning (China)
19 November 2024
20:00 UTC+4

United Arab Emirates	5–0	Qatar
Lima 4', 45' (pen.), 45+5', 56' (pen.); Al-Ghassani 73'	Report (FIFA); Report (AFC)

Al Nahyan Stadium, Abu Dhabi
Attendance: 13,825
Referee: Khalid Al-Turais (Saudi Arabia)

20 March 2025
21:00 UTC+5

Uzbekistan	1–0	Kyrgyzstan
Alijonov 40'	Report (FIFA); Report (AFC)

Milliy Stadium, Tashkent
Attendance: 32,458
Referee: Yusuke Araki (Japan)
20 March 2025
19:30 UTC+3:30

Iran	2–0	United Arab Emirates
Azmoun 45+27'; Mo. Mohebi 70'	Report (FIFA); Report (AFC)

Azadi Stadium, Tehran
Attendance: 20,469
Referee: Ko Hyung-jin (South Korea)
20 March 2025
21:15 UTC+3

Qatar	5–1	North Korea
Afif 17'; Al Ganehi 23'; Kim Yu-song 34' (o.g.); Al-Rawi 56'; Alaaeldin 66'	Report (FIFA); Report (AFC)	Pak Kwang-hun 86'

Jassim bin Hamad Stadium, Al Rayyan
Attendance: 10,375
Referee: Mohanad Qasim Sarray (Iraq)

25 March 2025
19:45 UTC+6

Kyrgyzstan	3–1	Qatar
Kichin 45+1'; Mishchenko 82'; Shukurov 90+3'	Report (FIFA); Report (AFC)	Mendes 52'

Dolen Omurzakov Stadium, Bishkek
Attendance: 12,325
Referee: Nazmi Nasaruddin (Malaysia)
25 March 2025
19:30 UTC+3:30

Iran	2–2	Uzbekistan
Taremi 52', 83'	Report (FIFA); Report (AFC)	Erkinov 16'; Fayzullaev 53'

Azadi Stadium, Tehran
Attendance: 36,702
Referee: Ahmed Al-Kaf (Oman)
25 March 2025
21:15 UTC+3

North Korea	1–2	United Arab Emirates
Kim Yu-song 43'	Report (FIFA); Report (AFC)	Lima 5'; Adil 90+8'

Prince Faisal bin Fahd Sports City Stadium, Riyadh (Saudi Arabia) (Note: North Korea chose Riyadh, Saudi Arabia, as their home site for their matches against the United Arab Emirates and Kyrgyzstan due to "security concerns".)
Attendance: 223
Referee: Mohammed Al-Hoaish (Saudi Arabia)

5 June 2025
20:00 UTC+4

United Arab Emirates	0–0	Uzbekistan
	Report (FIFA); Report (AFC)

Al Nahyan Stadium, Abu Dhabi
Attendance: 9,820
Referee: Shaun Evans (Australia)
5 June 2025
21:15 UTC+3

Qatar	1–0	Iran
Miguel 41'	Report (FIFA); Report (AFC)

Jassim bin Hamad Stadium, Al Rayyan
Attendance: 8,925
Referee: Mohammed Al-Hoaish (Saudi Arabia)
5 June 2025
21:15 UTC+3

North Korea	2–2	Kyrgyzstan
Pak Kwang-hun 44'; Ri Jo-guk 52'	Report (FIFA); Report (AFC)	Alykulov 57'; Kim Sung-hye 90+5' (o.g.)

Prince Faisal bin Fahd Sports City Stadium, Riyadh (Saudi Arabia)
Attendance: 100
Referee: Adham Makhadmeh (Jordan)

10 June 2025
18:45 UTC+5

Uzbekistan	3–0	Qatar
Turgunboev 28'; Shomurodov 86'; Sergeev 90+2'	Report (FIFA); Report (AFC)

Milliy Stadium, Tashkent
Attendance: 32,931
Referee: Ma Ning (China)
10 June 2025
19:45 UTC+6

Kyrgyzstan	1–1	United Arab Emirates
Merk 90+5'	Report (FIFA); Report (AFC)	Abdalla 30'

Dolen Omurzakov Stadium, Bishkek
Attendance: 12,258
Referee: Ahmad Al-Ali (Kuwait)
10 June 2025
19:30 UTC+3:30

Iran	3–0	North Korea
Me. Mohebi 74'; Taremi 77'; Hosseinzadeh 90+3'	Report (FIFA); Report (AFC)

Azadi Stadium, Tehran
Attendance: 16,803
Referee: Nazmi Nasaruddin (Malaysia)

== Group B ==
Pos	Team	Pld	W	D	L	GF	GA	GD	Pts	Qualification	(South Korea)	(Jordan)	(Iraq)	(Oman)	(Palestine)	(Kuwait)
1	South Korea	10	6	4	0	20	7	+13	22	2026 FIFA World Cup	—	1–1	3–2	1–1	0–0	4–0
2	Jordan	10	4	4	2	16	8	+8	16	2026 FIFA World Cup	0–2	—	0–1	4–0	3–1	1–1
3	Iraq	10	4	3	3	9	9	0	15	Fourth round	0–2	0–0	—	1–0	1–0	2–2
4	Oman	10	3	2	5	9	14	−5	11	Fourth round	1–3	0–3	0–1	—	1–0	4–0
5	Palestine	10	2	4	4	10	13	−3	10		1–1	1–3	2–1	1–1	—	2–2
6	Kuwait	10	0	5	5	7	20	−13	5		1–3	1–1	0–0	0–1	0–2	—

Source: AFC, FIFA
Rules for classification: Tiebreakers
5 September 2024
20:00 UTC+9

South Korea	0–0	Palestine
	Report (FIFA); Report (AFC)

Seoul World Cup Stadium, Seoul
Attendance: 59,579
Referee: Alireza Faghani (Australia)
5 September 2024
19:00 UTC+3

Iraq	1–0	Oman
Hussein 13'	Report (FIFA); Report (AFC)

Basra International Stadium, Basra
Attendance: 63,720
Referee: Khalid Al-Turais (Saudi Arabia)
5 September 2024
21:00 UTC+3

Jordan	1–1	Kuwait
Al-Taamari 14'	Report (FIFA); Report (AFC)	Nasser 90+2' (pen.)

Amman International Stadium, Amman
Attendance: 13,555
Referee: Adel Al-Naqbi (United Arab Emirates)

10 September 2024
22:00 UTC+8

Palestine	1–3	Jordan
Abou Ali 41'	Report (FIFA); Report (AFC)	Al-Naimat 5', 50'; Al-Rawabdeh 72'

Kuala Lumpur Stadium, Kuala Lumpur (Malaysia) (Note: Palestine played all their home matches at a neutral venue until further notice, due to the ongoing Gaza war.)
Attendance: 3,012
Referee: Majed Al-Shamrani (Saudi Arabia)
10 September 2024
18:00 UTC+4

Oman	1–3	South Korea
Jung Seung-hyun 45+2' (o.g.)	Report (FIFA); Report (AFC)	Hwang Hee-chan 10'; Son Heung-min 82'; Joo Min-kyu 90+11'

Sultan Qaboos Sports Complex, Muscat
Attendance: 27,144
Referee: Ma Ning (China)
10 September 2024
21:00 UTC+3

Kuwait	0–0	Iraq
	Report (FIFA); Report (AFC)

Jaber Al-Ahmad International Stadium, Kuwait City
Attendance: 58,000
Referee: Hiroyuki Kimura (Japan)

10 October 2024
17:00 UTC+3

Jordan	0–2	South Korea
	Report (FIFA); Report (AFC)	Lee Jae-sung 38'; Oh Hyeon-gyu 68'

Amman International Stadium, Amman
Attendance: 14,655
Referee: Hiroyuki Kimura (Japan)
10 October 2024
20:00 UTC+4

Oman	4–0	Kuwait
Al-Mushaifri 17', 58'; Al-Ghassani 30'; Fawaz 79'	Report (FIFA); Report (AFC)

Sultan Qaboos Sports Complex, Muscat
Attendance: 25,891
Referee: Alireza Faghani (Australia)
10 October 2024
21:00 UTC+3

Iraq	1–0	Palestine
Hussein 31'	Report (FIFA); Report (AFC)

Basra International Stadium, Basra
Attendance: 44,773
Referee: Adel Al-Naqbi (United Arab Emirates)

15 October 2024
20:00 UTC+9

South Korea	3–2	Iraq
Oh Se-hun 41'; Oh Hyeon-gyu 74'; Lee Jae-sung 83'	Report (FIFA); Report (AFC)	Hussein 50'; Bayesh 90+5'

Yongin Mireu Stadium, Yongin
Attendance: 35,198
Referee: Rustam Lutfullin (Uzbekistan)
15 October 2024
19:00 UTC+3

Jordan	4–0	Oman
Al-Naimat 26', 54'; Olwan 49' (pen.), 87'	Report (FIFA); Report (AFC)

Amman International Stadium, Amman
Attendance: 14,515
Referee: Khalid Al-Turais (Saudi Arabia)
15 October 2024
19:00 UTC+3

Palestine	2–2	Kuwait
Abou Ali 41' (pen.); Qunbar 90+3'	Report (FIFA); Report (AFC)	Nasser 31' (pen.), 80'

Jassim bin Hamad Stadium, Doha (Qatar)
Attendance: 1,827
Referee: Abdulrahman Al-Jassim (Qatar)

14 November 2024
17:00 UTC+3

Kuwait	1–3	South Korea
Daham 60'	Report (FIFA); Report (AFC)	Oh Se-hun 10'; Son Heung-min 19' (pen.); Bae Jun-ho 74'

Jaber Al-Ahmad International Stadium, Kuwait City
Attendance: 22,791
Referee: Shaun Evans (Australia)
14 November 2024
20:00 UTC+4

Oman	1–0	Palestine
Al-Ghassani 83'	Report (FIFA); Report (AFC)

Sultan Qaboos Sports Complex, Muscat
Attendance: 21,754
Referee: Fu Ming (China)
14 November 2024
19:15 UTC+3

Iraq	0–0	Jordan
	Report (FIFA); Report (AFC)

Basra International Stadium, Basra
Attendance: 65,000
Referee: Mohammed Al-Hoish (Saudi Arabia)

19 November 2024
17:00 UTC+3

Palestine	1–1	South Korea
Qunbar 12'	Report (FIFA); Report (AFC)	Son Heung-min 16'

Amman International Stadium, Amman (Jordan)
Attendance: 2,405
Referee: Yusuke Araki (Japan)
19 November 2024
20:00 UTC+4

Oman	0–1	Iraq
	Report (FIFA); Report (AFC)	Amyn 36'

Sultan Qaboos Sports Complex, Muscat
Attendance: 26,377
Referee: Omar Al Ali (United Arab Emirates)
19 November 2024
21:15 UTC+3

Kuwait	1–1	Jordan
Daham 68'	Report (FIFA); Report (AFC)	Al-Naimat 21'

Jaber Al-Ahmad International Stadium, Kuwait City
Attendance: 29,400
Referee: Nazmi Nasaruddin (Malaysia)

20 March 2025
20:00 UTC+9

South Korea	1–1	Oman
Hwang Hee-chan 41'	Report (FIFA); Report (AFC)	Al-Busaidi 80'

Goyang Stadium, Goyang
Attendance: 35,212
Referee: Alireza Faghani (Australia)
20 March 2025
21:15 UTC+3

Iraq	2–2	Kuwait
Hashim 90+3'; Bayesh 90+11'	Report (FIFA); Report (AFC)	Nasser 39', 70'

Basra International Stadium, Basra
Attendance: 45,851
Referee: Ma Ning (China)
20 March 2025
21:15 UTC+3

Jordan	3–1	Palestine
Al-Arab 3'; Nasib 11'; Al-Taamari 45+3'	Report (FIFA); Report (AFC)	Seyam 33'

Amman International Stadium, Amman
Attendance: 9,555
Referee: Shaun Evans (Australia)

25 March 2025
20:00 UTC+9

South Korea	1–1	Jordan
Lee Jae-sung 5'	Report (FIFA); Report (AFC)	Kwon Kyung-won 30' (o.g.)

Suwon World Cup Stadium, Suwon
Attendance: 41,532
Referee: Ilgiz Tantashev (Uzbekistan)
25 March 2025
21:15 UTC+3

Palestine	2–1	Iraq
Abou Ali 88'; Mahajna 90+7'	Report (FIFA); Report (AFC)	Hussein 34'

Amman International Stadium, Amman (Jordan)
Attendance: 7,305
Referee: Khalid Al-Turais (Saudi Arabia)
25 March 2025
21:15 UTC+3

Kuwait	0–1	Oman
	Report (FIFA); Report (AFC)	Al-Sabhi 56'

Jaber Al-Ahmad International Stadium, Kuwait City
Attendance: 41,322
Referee: Salman Falahi (Qatar)

5 June 2025
20:00 UTC+4

Oman	0–3	Jordan
	Report (FIFA); Report (AFC)	Olwan 45+7' (pen.), 51', 64'

Sultan Qaboos Sports Complex, Muscat
Attendance: 13,878
Referee: Khalid Al-Turais (Saudi Arabia)
5 June 2025
21:15 UTC+3

Iraq	0–2	South Korea
	Report (FIFA); Report (AFC)	Kim Jin-gyu 63'; Oh Hyeon-gyu 82'

Basra International Stadium, Basra
Attendance: 55,972
Referee: Yusuke Araki (Japan)
5 June 2025
21:15 UTC+3

Kuwait	0–2	Palestine
	Report (FIFA); Report (AFC)	Seyam 32'; Abou Ali 88' (pen.)

Jaber Al-Ahmad International Stadium, Kuwait City
Attendance: 5,250
Referee: Sadullo Gulmurodi (Tajikistan)

10 June 2025
20:00 UTC+9

South Korea	4–0	Kuwait
Al Hajeri 30' (o.g.); Lee Kang-in 51'; Oh Hyeon-gyu 54'; Lee Jae-sung 72'	Report (FIFA); Report (AFC)

Seoul World Cup Stadium, Seoul
Attendance: 41,119
Referee: Majed Al-Shamrani (Saudi Arabia)
10 June 2025
21:15 UTC+3

Jordan	0–1	Iraq
	Report (FIFA); Report (AFC)	Jassim 73'

Amman International Stadium, Amman
Attendance: 15,502
Referee: Omar Al Ali (United Arab Emirates)
10 June 2025
21:15 UTC+3

Palestine	1–1	Oman
Kharoub 49'	Report (FIFA); Report (AFC)	Al-Sabhi 90+7' (pen.)

King Abdullah II Stadium, Amman (Jordan)
Attendance: 8,500
Referee: Mooud Bonyadifard (Iran)

== Group C ==
Pos	Team	Pld	W	D	L	GF	GA	GD	Pts	Qualification	(Japan)	(Australia)	(Saudi Arabia)	(Indonesia)	(China)	(Bahrain)
1	Japan	10	7	2	1	30	3	+27	23	2026 FIFA World Cup	—	1–1	0–0	6–0	7–0	2–0
2	Australia	10	5	4	1	16	7	+9	19	2026 FIFA World Cup	1–0	—	0–0	5–1	3–1	0–1
3	Saudi Arabia	10	3	4	3	7	8	−1	13	Fourth round	0–2	1–2	—	1–1	1–0	0–0
4	Indonesia	10	3	3	4	9	20	−11	12	Fourth round	0–4	0–0	2–0	—	1–0	1–0
5	China	10	3	0	7	7	20	−13	9		1–3	0–2	1–2	2–1	—	1–0
6	Bahrain	10	1	3	6	5	16	−11	6		0–5	2–2	0–2	2–2	0–1	—

Source: AFC, FIFA
Rules for classification: Tiebreakers
5 September 2024
20:10 UTC+10

Australia	0–1	Bahrain
	Report (FIFA); Report (AFC)	Souttar 89' (o.g.)

Robina Stadium, Gold Coast
Attendance: 24,644
Referee: Omar Al Ali (United Arab Emirates)
5 September 2024
19:35 UTC+9

Japan	7–0	China
Endo 12'; Mitoma 45+2'; Minamino 52', 58'; Itō 77'; Maeda 87'; Kubo 90+5'	Report (FIFA); Report (AFC)

Saitama Stadium 2002, Saitama
Attendance: 52,398
Referee: Abdulrahman Al-Jassim (Qatar)
5 September 2024
21:00 UTC+3

Saudi Arabia	1–1	Indonesia
Al-Juwayr 45+3'	Report (FIFA); Report (AFC)	Walsh 19'

King Abdullah Sports City Stadium, Jeddah
Attendance: 42,385
Referee: Adham Makhadmeh (Jordan)

10 September 2024
19:00 UTC+7

Indonesia	0–0	Australia
	Report (FIFA); Report (AFC)

Gelora Bung Karno Stadium, Jakarta
Attendance: 70,059
Referee: Salman Falahi (Qatar)
10 September 2024
20:00 UTC+8

China	1–2	Saudi Arabia
Lajami 14' (o.g.)	Report (FIFA); Report (AFC)	Kadesh 39', 90'

Dalian Suoyuwan Football Stadium, Dalian
Attendance: 48,628
Referee: Nasrullo Kabirov (Tajikistan)
10 September 2024
19:00 UTC+3

Bahrain	0–5	Japan
	Report (FIFA); Report (AFC)	Ueda 37' (pen.), 47'; Morita 61', 64'; Ogawa 81'

Bahrain National Stadium, Riffa
Attendance: 22,729
Referee: Rustam Lutfullin (Uzbekistan)

10 October 2024
19:40 UTC+10:30

Australia	3–1	China
Miller 45+2'; Goodwin 53'; Velupillay 90+2'	Report (FIFA); Report (AFC)	Xie Wenneng 20'

Adelaide Oval, Adelaide
Attendance: 46,219
Referee: Nazmi Nasaruddin (Malaysia)
10 October 2024
19:00 UTC+3

Bahrain	2–2	Indonesia
Marhoon 15', 90+9'	Report (FIFA); Report (AFC)	Oratmangoen 45+3'; Struick 74'

Bahrain National Stadium, Riffa
Attendance: 10,731
Referee: Ahmed Al-Kaf (Oman)
10 October 2024
21:00 UTC+3

Saudi Arabia	0–2	Japan
	Report (FIFA); Report (AFC)	Kamada 14'; Ogawa 81'

King Abdullah Sports City Stadium, Jeddah
Attendance: 56,283
Referee: Kim Jong-hyeok (South Korea)

15 October 2024
19:35 UTC+9 (Note: Because of traffic accidents holding up the Australians on the Shuto Expressway, Football Australia and JFA jointly requested to slightly postpone the match, but were denied by the AFC match commissioner. Australia started warming up at 19:06, 29 minutes before kick-off. Australia, staying in the Hotel Chinzanso Tokyo in downtown Bunkyō, Tokyo, took 2 hours 9 minutes (16:37–18:46) to arrive the stadium via chartered coach, while ordinary driving time from Tokyo Station is estimated to be 40 minutes, according to the stadium.)

Japan	1–1	Australia
Burgess 76' (o.g.)	Report (FIFA); Report (AFC)	Taniguchi 58' (o.g.)

Saitama Stadium 2002, Saitama
Attendance: 58,730
Referee: Ahmad Al-Ali (Kuwait)
15 October 2024
20:00 UTC+8

China	2–1	Indonesia
Behram 21'; Zhang Yuning 44'	Report (FIFA); Report (AFC)	Haye 86'

Qingdao Youth Football Stadium, Qingdao
Attendance: 37,133
Referee: Omar Al Ali (United Arab Emirates)
15 October 2024
21:00 UTC+3

Saudi Arabia	0–0	Bahrain
	Report (FIFA); Report (AFC)

King Abdullah Sports City Stadium, Jeddah
Attendance: 35,437
Referee: Salman Falahi (Qatar)

14 November 2024
20:10 UTC+11

Australia	0–0	Saudi Arabia
	Report (FIFA); Report (AFC)

Melbourne Rectangular Stadium, Melbourne
Attendance: 27,491
Referee: Adel Al-Naqbi (United Arab Emirates)
14 November 2024
17:00 UTC+3

Bahrain	0–1	China
	Report (FIFA); Report (AFC)	Zhang Yuning 90+1'

Bahrain National Stadium, Riffa
Attendance: 7,921
Referee: Adham Makhadmeh (Jordan)
15 November 2024
19:00 UTC+7

Indonesia	0–4	Japan
	Report (FIFA); Report (AFC)	Hubner 35' (o.g.); Minamino 40'; Morita 49'; Sugawara 69'

Gelora Bung Karno Stadium, Jakarta
Attendance: 60,304
Referee: Mooud Bonyadifard (Iran)

19 November 2024
20:00 UTC+8

China	1–3	Japan
Lin Liangming 48'	Report (FIFA); Report (AFC)	Ogawa 39', 54'; Itakura 45+6'

Xiamen Egret Stadium, Xiamen
Attendance: 45,336
Referee: Muhammad Taqi (Singapore)
19 November 2024
19:00 UTC+7

Indonesia	2–0	Saudi Arabia
Marselino 32', 57'	Report (FIFA); Report (AFC)

Gelora Bung Karno Stadium, Jakarta
Attendance: 55,970
Referee: Rustam Lutfullin (Uzbekistan)
19 November 2024
18:15 UTC+3

Bahrain	2–2	Australia
Abduljabbar 75', 77'	Report (FIFA); Report (AFC)	Yengi 1', 90+6'

Bahrain National Stadium, Riffa
Attendance: 6,873
Referee: Ko Hyung-jin (South Korea)

20 March 2025
20:10 UTC+11

Australia	5–1	Indonesia
Boyle 18' (pen.); Velupillay 20'; Irvine 34', 90'; Miller 61'	Report (FIFA); Report (AFC)	Romeny 78'

Sydney Football Stadium, Sydney
Attendance: 35,241
Referee: Adham Makhadmeh (Jordan)
20 March 2025
19:35 UTC+9

Japan	2–0	Bahrain
Kamada 66'; Kubo 87'	Report (FIFA); Report (AFC)

Saitama Stadium 2002, Saitama
Attendance: 58,137
Referee: Abdulrahman Al-Jassim (Qatar)
20 March 2025
21:15 UTC+3

Saudi Arabia	1–0	China
S. Al-Dawsari 50'	Report (FIFA); Report (AFC)

King Saud University Stadium, Riyadh
Attendance: 24,742
Referee: Omar Al Ali (United Arab Emirates)

25 March 2025
19:35 UTC+9

Japan	0–0	Saudi Arabia
	Report (FIFA); Report (AFC)

Saitama Stadium 2002, Saitama
Attendance: 58,003
Referee: Ahmad Al-Ali (Kuwait)
25 March 2025
19:00 UTC+8

China	0–2	Australia
	Report (FIFA); Report (AFC)	Irvine 16'; Velupillay 29'

Hangzhou Sports Park Stadium, Hangzhou
Attendance: 70,588
Referee: Mooud Bonyadifard (Iran)
25 March 2025
20:45 UTC+7

Indonesia	1–0	Bahrain
Romeny 24'	Report (FIFA); Report (AFC)

Gelora Bung Karno Stadium, Jakarta
Attendance: 69,599
Referee: Sadullo Gulmurodi (Tajikistan)

5 June 2025
19:10 UTC+8

Australia	1–0	Japan
Behich 90'	Report (FIFA); Report (AFC)

Perth Stadium, Perth
Attendance: 57,226
Referee: Qasim Al-Hatmi (Oman)
5 June 2025
20:45 UTC+7

Indonesia	1–0	China
Romeny 45' (pen.)	Report (FIFA); Report (AFC)

Gelora Bung Karno Stadium, Jakarta
Attendance: 69,661
Referee: Rustam Lutfullin (Uzbekistan)
5 June 2025
19:00 UTC+3

Bahrain	0–2	Saudi Arabia
	Report (FIFA); Report (AFC)	Al-Juwayr 16'; Al-Aboud 78'

Bahrain National Stadium, Riffa
Attendance: 15,075
Referee: Ilgiz Tantashev (Uzbekistan)

10 June 2025
19:35 UTC+9

Japan	6–0	Indonesia
Kamada 15', 45+6'; Kubo 19'; Morishita 55'; Machino 58'; Hosoya 80'	Report (FIFA); Report (AFC)

Suita City Football Stadium, Suita
Attendance: 33,661
Referee: Kim Jong-hyeok (South Korea)
10 June 2025
19:00 UTC+8

China	1–0	Bahrain
Wang Yudong 90+3' (pen.)	Report (FIFA); Report (AFC)

Longxing Football Stadium, Chongqing
Attendance: 51,236
Referee: Adel Al-Naqbi (United Arab Emirates)
10 June 2025
21:15 UTC+3

Saudi Arabia	1–2	Australia
Al-Aboud 19'	Report (FIFA); Report (AFC)	Metcalfe 42'; Duke 48'

King Abdullah Sports City Stadium, Jeddah
Attendance: 24,620
Referee: Abdulrahman Al-Jassim (Qatar)

== Goalscorers ==
There were 231 goals scored in 90 matches, for an average of 2.57 goals per match.

5 goals

- (Iran national football team) Mehdi Taremi
- (Jordan national football team) Yazan Al-Naimat
- (Jordan national football team) Ali Olwan
- (Kuwait national football team) Yousef Nasser
- (Qatar national football team) Almoez Ali
- (United Arab Emirates national football team) Fábio Lima

4 goals

- (Iran national football team) Sardar Azmoun
- (Iran national football team) Mohammad Mohebi
- (Iraq national football team) Aymen Hussein
- (Japan national football team) Daichi Kamada
- (Japan national football team) Kōki Ogawa
- (Palestine national football team) Wessam Abou Ali
- (South Korea national football team) Lee Jae-sung
- (South Korea national football team) Oh Hyeon-gyu
- (United Arab Emirates national football team) Harib Abdalla
- (Uzbekistan national football team) Abbosbek Fayzullaev

3 goals

- (Australia men's national soccer team) Jackson Irvine
- (Australia men's national soccer team) Nishan Velupillay
- (Indonesia national football team) Ole Romeny
- (Japan national football team) Takefusa Kubo
- (Japan national football team) Takumi Minamino
- (Japan national football team) Hidemasa Morita
- (Kyrgyzstan national football team) Joel Kojo
- (South Korea national football team) Son Heung-min

2 goals

- (Australia men's national soccer team) Lewis Miller
- (Australia men's national soccer team) Kusini Yengi
- (Bahrain national football team) Mahdi Abduljabbar
- (Bahrain national football team) Mohamed Marhoon
- (China national football team) Zhang Yuning
- (Indonesia national football team) Marselino Ferdinan
- (Iran national football team) Mehdi Ghayedi
- (Iraq national football team) Ibrahim Bayesh
- (Japan national football team) Ayase Ueda
- (Jordan national football team) Musa Al-Taamari
- (Kuwait national football team) Mohammad Daham
- (Kyrgyzstan national football team) Alimardon Shukurov
- (North Korea national football team) Kim Yu-song
- (North Korea national football team) Pak Kwang-hun
- (Oman national football team) Muhsen Al-Ghassani
- (Oman national football team) Abdulrahman Al-Mushaifri
- (Oman national football team) Issam Al-Sabhi
- (Palestine national football team) Zaid Qunbar
- (Palestine national football team) Tamer Seyam
- (Qatar national football team) Akram Afif
- (Qatar national football team) Ibrahim Al-Hassan
- (Qatar national football team) Lucas Mendes
- (Saudi Arabia national football team) Abdulrahman Al-Aboud
- (Saudi Arabia national football team) Musab Al-Juwayr
- (Saudi Arabia national football team) Hassan Kadesh
- (South Korea national football team) Hwang Hee-chan
- (South Korea national football team) Oh Se-hun
- (United Arab Emirates national football team) Yahya Al-Ghassani
- (Uzbekistan national football team) Eldor Shomurodov

1 goal

- (Australia men's national soccer team) Aziz Behich
- (Australia men's national soccer team) Martin Boyle
- (Australia men's national soccer team) Mitchell Duke
- (Australia men's national soccer team) Craig Goodwin
- (Australia men's national soccer team) Connor Metcalfe
- (China national football team) Behram Abduweli
- (China national football team) Lin Liangming
- (China national football team) Wang Yudong
- (China national football team) Xie Wenneng
- (Indonesia national football team) Thom Haye
- (Indonesia national football team) Ragnar Oratmangoen
- (Indonesia national football team) Rafael Struick
- (Indonesia national football team) Sandy Walsh
- (Iran national football team) Saleh Hardani
- (Iran national football team) Amirhossein Hosseinzadeh
- (Iran national football team) Mohammad Mehdi Mohebi
- (Iraq national football team) Youssef Amyn
- (Iraq national football team) Akam Hashim
- (Iraq national football team) Sajjad Jassim
- (Japan national football team) Wataru Endo
- (Japan national football team) Mao Hosoya
- (Japan national football team) Ko Itakura
- (Japan national football team) Junya Itō
- (Japan national football team) Shūto Machino
- (Japan national football team) Daizen Maeda
- (Japan national football team) Kaoru Mitoma
- (Japan national football team) Ryōya Morishita
- (Japan national football team) Yukinari Sugawara
- (Jordan national football team) Yazan Al-Arab
- (Jordan national football team) Noor Al-Rawabdeh
- (Jordan national football team) Abdallah Nasib
- (Kyrgyzstan national football team) Odilzhon Abdurakhmanov
- (Kyrgyzstan national football team) Gulzhigit Alykulov
- (Kyrgyzstan national football team) Khristiyan Brauzman
- (Kyrgyzstan national football team) Valery Kichin
- (Kyrgyzstan national football team) Kai Merk
- (Kyrgyzstan national football team) Aleksandr Mishchenko
- (North Korea national football team) Jong Il-gwan
- (North Korea national football team) Kang Kuk-chol
- (North Korea national football team) Ri Il-song
- (North Korea national football team) Ri Jo-guk
- (Oman national football team) Ali Al-Busaidi
- (Oman national football team) Abdullah Fawaz
- (Palestine national football team) Oday Kharoub
- (Palestine national football team) Ameed Mahajna
- (Qatar national football team) Ahmed Al-Rawi
- (Qatar national football team) Ahmed Alaaeldin
- (Qatar national football team) Ahmed Al Ganehi
- (Qatar national football team) Pedro Miguel
- (Saudi Arabia national football team) Salem Al-Dawsari
- (South Korea national football team) Bae Jun-ho
- (South Korea national football team) Joo Min-kyu
- (South Korea national football team) Kim Jin-gyu
- (South Korea national football team) Lee Kang-in
- (United Arab Emirates national football team) Sultan Adil
- (United Arab Emirates national football team) Khaled Ibrahim
- (United Arab Emirates national football team) Marcus Meloni
- (United Arab Emirates national football team) Ali Saleh
- (Uzbekistan national football team) Khojiakbar Alijonov
- (Uzbekistan national football team) Husniddin Aliqulov
- (Uzbekistan national football team) Khojimat Erkinov
- (Uzbekistan national football team) Jaloliddin Masharipov
- (Uzbekistan national football team) Igor Sergeev
- (Uzbekistan national football team) Otabek Shukurov
- (Uzbekistan national football team) Azizbek Turgunboev
- (Uzbekistan national football team) Oston Urunov

1 own goal

- (Australia men's national soccer team) Cameron Burgess (against Japan)
- (Australia men's national soccer team) Harry Souttar (against Bahrain)
- (Indonesia national football team) Justin Hubner (against Japan)
- (Iran national football team) Mehdi Taremi (against North Korea)
- (Japan national football team) Shogo Taniguchi (against Australia)
- (Kuwait national football team) Fahad Al Hajeri (against South Korea)
- (Kyrgyzstan national football team) Tamirlan Kozubayev (against Qatar)
- (North Korea national football team) Kim Sung-hye (against Kyrgyzstan)
- (North Korea national football team) Kim Yu-song (against Qatar)
- (Qatar national football team) Ismaeel Mohammad (against Iran)
- (Saudi Arabia national football team) Ali Lajami (against China)
- (South Korea national football team) Jung Seung-hyun (against Oman)
- (South Korea national football team) Kwon Kyung-won (against Jordan)

== Discipline ==
A player was automatically suspended for the next match for the following infractions:

- Receiving a red card (red card suspensions may be extended for serious infractions)
- Receiving two yellow cards in two different matches (yellow card suspensions are carried forward to further qualification rounds, but not the finals or any other future international matches)

The following suspensions were served during the third round:

Team	Player	Infraction(s)	Suspended for match(es)
Australia	Craig Goodwin	(yellow card) vs Indonesia (10 September 2024); (yellow card) vs Japan (15 October 2024)	vs Saudi Arabia (14 November 2024)
Australia	Kusini Yengi	(red card) vs Bahrain (5 September 2024)	vs Indonesia (10 September 2024) vs China (10 October 2024)
Bahrain	Waleed Al Hayam	(red card) vs China (14 November 2024)	vs Australia (19 November 2024)
Bahrain	Abdulla Al-Khulasi	(yellow card) vs Australia (5 September 2024); (yellow card) vs Saudi Arabia (15 October 2024)	vs China (14 November 2024)
Bahrain	Amine Benaddi	(yellow card) vs Saudi Arabia (15 October 2024); (yellow card) vs Japan (20 March 2025)	vs Indonesia (25 March 2025)
Bahrain	Ali Madan	(yellow card) vs Saudi Arabia (15 October 2024); (yellow card) vs Indonesia (25 March 2025)	vs Saudi Arabia (5 June 2025)
China	Behram Abduweli	(yellow card) vs Saudi Arabia (10 September 2024); (yellow card) vs Bahrain (14 November 2024)	vs Japan (19 November 2024)
China	Lin Liangming	(yellow card) vs Bahrain (14 November 2024); (red card) vs Saudi Arabia (20 March 2025)	vs Australia (25 March 2025) vs Indonesia (5 June 2025)
China	Wang Shangyuan	(yellow card) vs Australia (10 October 2024); (yellow card) vs Saudi Arabia (20 March 2025)	vs Australia (25 March 2025)
China	Wei Shihao	(yellow card) vs Japan (19 November 2024); (yellow card) vs Indonesia (5 June 2025)	vs Bahrain (10 June 2025)
China	Xie Wenneng	(yellow card) vs Saudi Arabia (10 September 2024); (yellow card) vs Indonesia (15 October 2024)	vs Bahrain (14 November 2024)
China	Xie Wenneng	(yellow card) vs Japan (19 November 2024); (yellow card) vs Australia (25 March 2025)	vs Indonesia (5 June 2025)
Indonesia	Marselino Ferdinan	(yellow card) vs Bahrain (10 October 2024); (yellow card) vs Bahrain (25 March 2025)	vs China (5 June 2025)
Indonesia	Justin Hubner	(yellow card) vs Vietnam (21 March 2024); (yellow card) vs Philippines (11 June 2024)	vs Saudi Arabia (5 September 2024)
Indonesia	Justin Hubner	(yellow card) vs Australia (10 September 2024); (yellow card) (yellow-red card) vs Saudi Arabia (19 November 2024)	vs Australia (20 March 2025)
Indonesia	Ivar Jenner	(yellow card) vs Bahrain (10 October 2024); (yellow card) vs China (15 October 2024)	vs Japan (14 November 2024)
Indonesia	Ivar Jenner	(yellow card) vs Saudi Arabia (19 November 2024); (yellow card) vs China (5 June 2025)	vs Japan (10 June 2025)
Indonesia	Ragnar Oratmangoen	(yellow card) vs Bahrain (10 October 2024); (yellow card) vs Saudi Arabia (19 November 2024)	vs Australia (20 March 2025)
Indonesia	Maarten Paes	(yellow card) vs Saudi Arabia (5 September 2024); (yellow card) vs Bahrain (25 March 2025)	vs China (5 June 2025)
Iran	Saman Ghoddos	(yellow card) vs United Arab Emirates (10 September 2024); (yellow card) vs Uzbekistan (10 October 2024)	vs Qatar (15 October 2024)
Iran	Saleh Hardani	(red card) vs Uzbekistan (10 October 2024)	vs Qatar (15 October 2024) vs North Korea (14 November 2024)
Iran	Shojae Khalilzadeh	(red card) vs North Korea (14 November 2024)	vs Kyrgyzstan (19 November 2024)
Iran	Milad Mohammadi	(yellow card) vs United Arab Emirates (10 September 2024); (yellow card) (yellow-red card) vs Qatar (5 June 2025)	vs North Korea (10 June 2025)
Iran	Mohammad Mohebi	(yellow card) vs Qatar (15 October 2024); (yellow card) vs United Arab Emirates (20 March 2025)	vs Uzbekistan (25 March 2025)
Iraq	Ali Al-Hamadi	(red card) vs South Korea (5 June 2025)	vs Jordan (10 June 2025)
Iraq	Amjad Attwan	(yellow card) vs Jordan (14 November 2024); (yellow card) vs Oman (19 November 2024)	vs Kuwait (20 March 2025)
Iraq	Merchas Doski	(yellow card) vs Oman (19 November 2024); (yellow card) vs Kuwait (20 March 2025)	vs Palestine (25 March 2025)
Iraq	Aymen Hussein	(yellow card) vs Oman (19 November 2024); (yellow card) vs Palestine (25 March 2025)	vs South Korea (5 June 2025)
Iraq	Mustafa Saadoon	(yellow card) vs South Korea (15 October 2024); (yellow card) vs Jordan (14 November 2024)	vs Oman (19 November 2024)
Iraq	Rebin Sulaka	(red card) vs Kuwait (10 September 2024)	vs Palestine (10 October 2024)
Jordan	Mahmoud Al-Mardi	(yellow card) vs Palestine (20 March 2025); (yellow card) vs South Korea (25 March 2025)	vs Oman (5 June 2025)
Jordan	Nizar Al-Rashdan	(yellow card) vs South Korea (10 October 2024); (yellow card) vs South Korea (25 March 2025)	vs Oman (5 June 2025)
Kuwait	Ahmed Al-Dhefiri	(yellow card) vs Jordan (5 September 2024); (yellow card) vs Palestine (15 October 2024)	vs South Korea (14 November 2024)
Kuwait	Muath Al-Enezi	(yellow card) vs Oman (10 October 2024); (yellow card) vs South Korea (14 November 2024)	vs Jordan (19 November 2024)
Kuwait	Sultan Al-Enezi	(yellow card) vs Iraq (20 March 2025); (yellow card) vs Oman (25 March 2025)	vs Palestine (5 June 2025)
Kuwait	Abdulrahman Al-Fadhli	(red card) vs Iraq (20 March 2025)	vs Oman (25 March 2025) vs Palestine (5 June 2025) vs South Korea (10 June 2025)
Kuwait	Sami Al-Sanea	(yellow card) vs Oman (10 October 2024); (yellow card) vs South Korea (14 November 2024)	vs Jordan (19 November 2024)
Kuwait	Yousef Nasser	(yellow card) vs Palestine (15 October 2024); (yellow card) vs Iraq (20 March 2025)	vs Oman (25 March 2025)
Kyrgyzstan	Odilzhon Abdurakhmanov	(yellow card) vs Qatar (10 October 2024); (yellow card) vs Uzbekistan (20 March 2025)	vs Qatar (25 March 2025)
Kyrgyzstan	Said Datsiev	(red card) vs Uzbekistan (20 March 2025)	vs Qatar (25 March 2025)
Kyrgyzstan	Ermek Kenzhebayev	(yellow card) vs North Korea (15 October 2024); (yellow card) vs Iran (19 November 2024)	vs Uzbekistan (20 March 2025)
Kyrgyzstan	Alimardon Shukurov	(yellow card) vs Iran (19 November 2024); (yellow card) vs Qatar (25 March 2025)	vs North Korea (5 June 2025)
North Korea	Jang Kuk-chol	(red card) vs Qatar (10 September 2024)	vs United Arab Emirates (10 October 2024)
North Korea	Jong Hwi-nam	(yellow card) vs Qatar (20 March 2025); (yellow card) vs United Arab Emirates (25 March 2025)	vs Kyrgyzstan (5 June 2025)
North Korea	Kim Kuk-jin	(yellow card) vs Qatar (20 March 2025); (yellow card) vs United Arab Emirates (25 March 2025)	vs Kyrgyzstan (5 June 2025)
North Korea	Kim Pom-hyok	(yellow card) vs Qatar (10 September 2024); (yellow card) vs United Arab Emirates (10 October 2024)	vs Kyrgyzstan (15 October 2024)
North Korea	Ri Il-song	(yellow card) vs Qatar (10 September 2024); (yellow card) vs Kyrgyzstan (15 October 2024)	vs Iran (14 November 2024)
North Korea	Ri Jo-guk	(yellow card) vs Iran (14 November 2024); (yellow card) vs Qatar (20 March 2025)	vs United Arab Emirates (25 March 2025)
Oman	Arshad Al-Alawi	(yellow card) (yellow-red card) vs Iraq (5 September 2024)	vs South Korea (10 September 2024)
Oman	Ali Al-Busaidi	(yellow card) vs South Korea (10 September 2024); (yellow card) vs Jordan (5 June 2025)	vs Palestine (10 June 2025)
Oman	Muhsen Al-Ghassani	(yellow card) vs South Korea (20 March 2025); (yellow card) vs Kuwait (25 March 2025)	vs Jordan (5 June 2025)
Oman	Amjad Al-Harthi	(yellow card) vs South Korea (10 September 2024); (yellow card) vs Jordan (15 October 2024)	vs Palestine (14 November 2024)
Oman	Harib Al-Saadi	(yellow card) vs South Korea (10 September 2024); (yellow card) vs Iraq (19 November 2024)	vs South Korea (20 March 2025)
Palestine	Hamed Hamdan	(yellow card) vs Jordan (20 March 2025); (yellow card) vs Iraq (25 March 2025)	vs Kuwait (5 June 2025)
Palestine	Oday Kharoub	(yellow card) vs South Korea (5 September 2024); (yellow card) vs South Korea (19 November 2024)	vs Jordan (20 March 2025)
Palestine	Ameed Mahajna	(yellow card) vs Iraq (10 October 2024); (yellow card) vs South Korea (19 November 2024)	vs Jordan (20 March 2025)
Palestine	Camilo Saldaña	(yellow card) vs South Korea (5 September 2024); (yellow card) (yellow-red card) vs Kuwait (15 October 2024)	vs Oman (14 November 2024)
Palestine	Tamer Seyam	(yellow card) vs South Korea (5 September 2024); (yellow card) vs Kuwait (15 October 2024)	vs Oman (14 November 2024)
Palestine	Michel Termanini	(yellow card) vs Jordan (10 September 2024); (yellow card) vs Iraq (10 October 2024)	vs Kuwait (15 October 2024)
Qatar	Almoez Ali	(yellow card) vs Kyrgyzstan (10 October 2024); (yellow card) vs United Arab Emirates (19 November 2024)	vs North Korea (20 March 2025)
Qatar	Ahmed Al-Rawi	(yellow card) vs Afghanistan (6 June 2024); (yellow card) vs India (11 June 2024)	vs United Arab Emirates (5 September 2024)
Qatar	Ahmed Fathy	(yellow card) vs Uzbekistan (14 November 2024); (yellow card) vs Iran (5 June 2025)	vs Uzbekistan (10 June 2025)
Qatar	Lucas Mendes	(red card) vs Kyrgyzstan (25 March 2025)	vs Iran (5 June 2025) vs Uzbekistan (10 June 2025)
Qatar	Tarek Salman	(yellow card) vs United Arab Emirates (5 September 2024); (yellow card) vs North Korea (10 September 2024)	vs Kyrgyzstan (10 October 2024)
Saudi Arabia	Saud Abdulhamid	(yellow card) vs China (10 September 2024); (yellow card) vs Japan (10 October 2024)	vs Bahrain (15 October 2024)
Saudi Arabia	Nasser Al-Dawsari	(yellow card) vs Tajikistan (21 March 2024); (yellow card) vs Jordan (11 June 2024)	vs Indonesia (5 September 2024)
Saudi Arabia	Mohamed Kanno	(yellow card) vs Indonesia (5 September 2024); (red card) vs China (10 September 2024)	vs Japan (10 October 2024) vs Bahrain (15 October 2024) vs Australia (14 November 2024)
South Korea	Moon Seon-min	(yellow card) vs Iraq (15 October 2024); (yellow card) vs Iraq (5 June 2025)	vs Kuwait (10 June 2025)
South Korea	Park Yong-woo	(yellow card) vs Iraq (15 October 2024); (yellow card) vs Iraq (5 June 2025)	vs Kuwait (10 June 2025)
United Arab Emirates	Kouame Autonne	(yellow card) vs Qatar (5 September 2024); (yellow card) vs North Korea (10 October 2024)	vs Uzbekistan (15 October 2024)
United Arab Emirates	Abdulla Hamad	(red card) vs Uzbekistan (15 October 2024)	vs Kyrgyzstan (14 November 2024) vs Qatar (19 November 2024)
United Arab Emirates	Marcus Meloni	(yellow card) vs North Korea (10 October 2024); (yellow card) vs Qatar (19 November 2024)	vs Iran (20 March 2025)
United Arab Emirates	Majid Rashid	(yellow card) vs Yemen (21 March 2024); (yellow card) vs Bahrain (11 June 2024)	vs Qatar (5 September 2024)
United Arab Emirates	Majid Rashid	(yellow card) vs Kyrgyzstan (14 November 2024); (yellow card) vs Qatar (19 November 2024)	vs Iran (20 March 2025)
Uzbekistan	Rustam Ashurmatov	(yellow card) vs Kyrgyzstan (10 September 2024); (yellow card) vs Iran (10 October 2024)	vs United Arab Emirates (15 October 2024)
Uzbekistan	Umar Eshmurodov	(red card) vs North Korea (19 November 2024)	vs Kyrgyzstan (20 March 2025)
Uzbekistan	Jaloliddin Masharipov	(yellow card) vs Qatar (14 November 2024); (yellow card) vs Kyrgyzstan (20 March 2025)	vs Iran (25 March 2025)

== See also ==
- 2026 FIFA World Cup qualification – AFC fourth round
