= Ri Jo-guk =

North Korean footballer (born 2005)

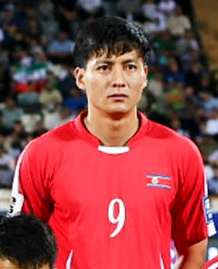
- Ri in 2025

Personal information
- Full name: Ri Jo-guk
- Date of birth: 9 May 2002 (age 24)
- Place of birth: Pyongyang, North Korea
- Height: 1.80 m (5 ft 11 in)
- Position: Striker

Youth career
- Pyongyang Sports Club

Senior career*
Years	Team	Apps	(Gls)
2022–	Ryomyong SC		

International career
2023	North Korea U23	5	(1)
2024–	North Korea	11	(4)
- * Club domestic league appearances and goals as of 23 March 2025

Ri Jo-guk (Korean: 리조국; born 9 May 2002) is a North Korean professional footballer who plays as a striker for DPR Korea Premier Football League club Ryomyong SC and the North Korea national team.

== Club career ==
Ri began his youth career at Pyongyang sport school.

After his graduation, he joined Ryomyong SC. In 2024, he received his first trophy after Ryomyong SC won the DPR Korea Premier Football League.

== International career ==
=== Under-23 ===
Ri received his international call-up in 2023 to North Korea U23 for the 2022 Asian Games. He made his international debut against Chinese Taipei U23 in a 2–0 win, he also scored his first international goal after 12 minutes in the match. North Korea went through the group stage and defeated Bahrain U23 2–0 in the round of 16. However, in the quarter-finals, they faced Japan U23 and lost 2–1.

=== Senior ===
In 2024, he was named in North Korea's squad for the 2026 FIFA World Cup qualification by coach Sin Yong-nam. On 21 March, he made his debut against Japan in a 1–0 loss. In the qualification 2nd round, he scored his first goal and also his first hattrick for the national team in a match against Myanmar to secure the 4–1 win, which helped the team qualify to the qualification 3rd round.

== International goals ==
No.	Date	Venue	Opponent	Score	Result	Competition
1.	11 June 2024	New Laos National Stadium, Vientiane, Laos	Myanmar	2–0	4–1	2026 FIFA World Cup qualification
2.	11 June 2024	New Laos National Stadium, Vientiane, Laos	Myanmar	3–0	4–1	2026 FIFA World Cup qualification
3.	11 June 2024	New Laos National Stadium, Vientiane, Laos	Myanmar	4–1	4–1	2026 FIFA World Cup qualification
4.	5 June 2025	Prince Faisal bin Fahd Sports City Stadium, Riyadh, Saudi Arabia	Kyrgyzstan	2–0	2–2	2026 FIFA World Cup qualification

== Honours ==
=== Ryomyong SC ===
- DPR Korea Premier Football League: 2023-2024
