= Khristiyan Brauzman =

Kyrgyzstani footballer

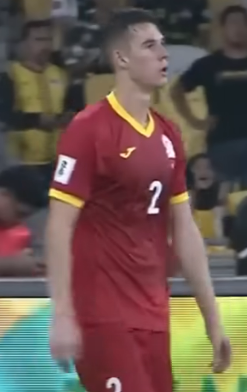
- Brauzman in 2023

Personal information
- Full name: Khristiyan Yevgenyevich Brauzman
- Date of birth: 15 August 2003 (age 23)
- Place of birth: Kant, Kyrgyzstan
- Height: 1.89 m (6 ft 2 in)
- Position: Right-back

Team information
- Current team: Abdysh-Ata Kant
- Number: 2

Youth career
- –2020: Eskişehirspor
- 2020–2021: Abdysh-Ata Kant

Senior career*
Years	Team	Apps	(Gls)
2021–	Abdysh-Ata Kant	109	(7)

International career^{‡}
- Kyrgyzstan U17
- Kyrgyzstan U19
- Kyrgyzstan U23
2021–	Kyrgyzstan	29	(2)
- * Club domestic league appearances and goals as of 20:03, 8 November 2025 (UTC) ‡ National team caps and goals as of 19:58, 10 June 2025 (UTC)

Khristiyan (or Christian) Yevgenyevich Brauzman (Kyrgyz: Християн Евгеньевич Браузман; born 15 August 2003) is a Kyrgyzstani footballer who plays as a right-back for Abdysh-Ata Kant.

Brauzman began playing club football in Turkey and made his debut for Kyrgyzstan in September 2021.

== Career statistics ==
=== Club ===
As of match played 8 November 2025

Appearances and goals by club, season and competition
Club	Season	League			Cup		Continental		Other		Total	
Club	Season	Division	Apps	Goals	Apps	Goals	Apps	Goals	Apps	Goals	Apps	Goals
Abdysh-Ata Kant	2021	Kyrgyz Premier League	25	1	1 (Note: Appearances in the Kyrgyzstan Cup)	0	0	0	0	0	26	1
Abdysh-Ata Kant	2022	Kyrgyz Premier League	16	0	0	0	0	0	0	0	16	0
Abdysh-Ata Kant	2023	Kyrgyz Premier League	25	2	5	1	10 (Note: Appearances in the AFC Cup)	0	0	0	40	3
Abdysh-Ata Kant	2024	Kyrgyz Premier League	18	2	3	0	3 (Note: Appearances in the AFC Challenge League)	0	0	0	24	2
Abdysh-Ata Kant	2025	Kyrgyz Premier League	25	2	1	0	3	0	1 (Note: Appearances in the Kyrgyzstan Super Cup)	0	30	2
Career total			109	7	10	0	16	0	1	0	136	8

=== International ===
As of matches played 10 June 2025.

Appearances and goals by national team and year
National team	Year	Apps	Goals
Kyrgyzstan	2021	1	0
Kyrgyzstan	2022	5	0
Kyrgyzstan	2023	9	0
Kyrgyzstan	2024	10	2
Kyrgyzstan	2025	4	0
Total		29	2

No.	Date	Venue	Opponent	Score	Result	Competition
1.	26 March 2024	Dolen Omurzakov Stadium, Bishkek, Kyrgyzstan	Chinese Taipei	4–0	5–1	2026 FIFA World Cup qualification
2.	15 October 2024	Dolen Omurzakov Stadium, Bishkek, Kyrgyzstan	North Korea	1–0	1–0	2026 FIFA World Cup qualification
