= 2021 Three Nations Cup =

The 2021 Three Nations Cup may refer to:

- 2021 Three Nations Cup (Nepal), a friendly football tournament held in March 2021 in Nepal
- 2021 Three Nations Cup (Kyrgyzstan), a friendly football tournament held in September 2021 in Kyrgyzstan
