= 2022 FIFA World Cup qualification – AFC second round =

Tournament details
- Dates: 5 September 2019 – 15 June 2021
- Teams: 40 (from 1 confederation)

Tournament statistics
- Matches played: 157
- Goals scored: 519 (3.31 per match)
- Attendance: 1,598,753 (10,183 per match)
- Top scorer(s): (United Arab Emirates) Ali Mabkhout (11 goals)

The AFC second round of 2022 FIFA World Cup qualification, which also served as the second round of 2023 AFC Asian Cup qualification, was played from 5 September 2019 to 15 June 2021.

== Format ==
A total of forty teams were drawn into eight groups of five to play home-and-away round-robin matches. They included the 34 teams (teams ranked 1–34 in the AFC entrant list) which received byes to this round, and the six winners from the first round.

Seven group winners (excluding Qatar, who had already qualified to the World Cup as tournament hosts) and the five best runners-up advanced to the third round.

Matches in this round were also part of the 2023 AFC Asian Cup qualifying campaign. The twelve teams which advanced to the third round of the FIFA World Cup qualification and Qatar, as group winners, automatically qualified for the 2023 AFC Asian Cup. Twenty-four teams (22 of which advanced directly and two which advanced from an additional play-off round) played in the third round of the AFC Asian Cup qualification to decide the remaining eleven teams. In total, the 2023 AFC Asian Cup featured 24 teams.

== Seeding ==
The draw for the second round was held on 17 July 2019 at 17:00 MST (UTC+8), at the AFC House in Kuala Lumpur, Malaysia.

The seeding was based on the FIFA World Rankings of June 2019 (shown in parentheses below).

Note: Bolded teams qualified for the third round.

Pot 1	Pot 2	Pot 3	Pot 4	Pot 5
1. **Iran** (20); 2. **Japan** (28); 3. **South Korea** (37); 4. **Australia** (43); 5. Qatar (55) (Note: Qatar already qualified for the 2022 FIFA World Cup as tournament hosts and were competing to qualify for the 2023 AFC Asian Cup. They were later selected as host replacement within the qualified teams of the Asian Cup.); 6. **United Arab Emirates** (67); 7. **Saudi Arabia** (69); 8. **China** (73) (Note: China PR had already qualified for the 2023 AFC Asian Cup as tournament hosts and were competing to qualify for the 2022 FIFA World Cup. They relinquished their hosting right in May 2022.)	9. **Iraq** (77); 10. Uzbekistan (82); 11. **Syria** (85); 12. **Oman** (86); 13. **Lebanon** (86); 14. Kyrgyzstan (95); 15. **Vietnam** (96); 16. Jordan (98)	17. Palestine (100); 18. India (101); 19. Bahrain (110); 20. Thailand (116); 21. Tajikistan (120); 22. North Korea (122)^{W}; 23. Chinese Taipei (125); 24. Philippines (126)	25. Turkmenistan (135); 26. Myanmar (138); 27. Hong Kong (141); 28. Yemen (144); 29. Afghanistan (149); 30. Maldives (151); 31. Kuwait (156); 32. Malaysia (159)^{†}	33. Indonesia (160); 34. Singapore (162); 35. Nepal (165); 36. Cambodia (169)^{†}; 37. Bangladesh (183)^{†}; 38. Mongolia (187)^{†}; 39. Guam (190)^{†}; 40. Sri Lanka (201)^{†}

^{†} First round winners
^{W} Withdrew after five matches

== Schedule ==
The schedule of each matchday was as follows.

On 5 March 2020, FIFA announced that it would be monitoring the health situation in the region for possible rescheduling of matchdays 7 through 10 due to the COVID-19 pandemic. Later on 9 March, FIFA and AFC jointly announced that the matches on matchdays 7–10 due to take place in March and June 2020 were postponed, with the new dates to be confirmed. However, subject to approval by FIFA and AFC, and agreement of both member associations, the matches may be played as scheduled provided that all individuals' safety meets the required standards. On 5 June, AFC confirmed that matchdays 7 and 8 were scheduled to take place on 8 and 13 October respectively while matchdays 9 and 10 were scheduled to kick off on 12 and 17 November. On 12 August, FIFA announced that the matches scheduled for October and November 2020 would be rescheduled to 2021.

On 11 November 2020, the AFC Competitions Committee agreed at its third meeting that all second-round matches should be completed by 15 June 2021 with matchdays 7 and 8 in March and 9 and 10 in June. On the same day, however, FIFA, along with the Bangladeshi and Qatari associations, approved the only second-round match originally scheduled for 2020, Qatar versus Bangladesh, which was played on 4 December.

On 19 February 2021, FIFA and AFC postponed most of the upcoming matches to June.

Note: The group spots of Qatar and Bangladesh were swapped due to Qatar's planned participation in the 2020 Copa América, which was later deferred (becoming the 2021 Copa América). Qatar eventually withdrew.

Matchday	Date(s)
Matchday 1	5 September 2019
Matchday 2	10 September 2019
Matchday 3	10 October 2019
Matchday 4	15 October 2019
Matchday 5	14 November 2019
Matchday 6	19 November 2019
Matchday 7	25 March, 28 May and 3 June 2021
Matchday 8	4 December 2020, 30 March and 7 & 9 June 2021
Matchday 9	30 March, 30 May and 11 June 2021
Matchday 10	13 and 15 June 2021

Original group stage schedule
Matchday	Date
Matchday 7	26 March 2020, later 8 October
Matchday 8	31 March 2020, later 13 October
Matchday 9	4 June 2020, later 12 November, then 7 June 2021
Matchday 10	9 June 2020, later 17 November

=== Centralised venues ===
On 12 March 2021, AFC confirmed the hosts for the group stage scheduled to take place from 31 May to 15 June.

- Group A: United Arab Emirates (China hosted Guam on 28 May.)
- Group B: Kuwait
- Group C: Bahrain
- Group D: Saudi Arabia
- Group E: Qatar
- Group F: Japan
- Group G: United Arab Emirates
- Group H: South Korea

In general, these hosts were the seeded (Pot 1) teams from each group. The exceptions were Group A (where United Arab Emirates took over hosting duties after China could not host due to COVID-19 restrictions), Group B (where Pot 4 team Kuwait hosted rather than Australia), and Group C (where Pot 3 team Bahrain hosted rather than Iran).

== Group A ==
Pos	Team	Pld	W	D	L	GF	GA	GD	Pts	Qualification	United Arab Republic	People's Republic of China	Philippines	Maldives	Guam
1	Syria	8	7	0	1	22	7	+15	21	World Cup qualifying third round and Asian Cup	—	2–1	1–0	2–1	4–0
2	China (Note: China qualified for the Asian Cup as the host nation. They withdrew as the host in May 2022.)	8	6	1	1	30	3	+27	19	World Cup qualifying third round and Asian Cup	3–1	—	2–0	5–0	7–0
3	Philippines	8	3	2	3	12	11	+1	11	Asian Cup qualifying third round	2–5	0–0	—	1–1	3–0
4	Maldives	8	2	1	5	7	20	−13	7	Asian Cup qualifying third round	0–4	0–5	1–2	—	3–1
5	Guam	8	0	0	8	2	32	−30	0	Asian Cup qualifying play-off round	0–3	0–7	1–4	0–1	—

Source: FIFA
Rules for classification: Qualification tiebreakers
Notes:
5 September 2019
15:30 UTC+10

Guam	0–1	Maldives
	Report (FIFA); Report (AFC)	Mahudhee 27'

Guam F.A. National Training Center, Dededo
Attendance: 714
Referee: Yaqoub Al-Hammadi (United Arab Emirates)
5 September 2019
19:30 UTC+8

Philippines	2–5	Syria
Patiño 6'; Mi. Ott 83'	Report (FIFA); Report (AFC)	Al Somah 14', 55'; Mobayed 30'; Al-Khatib 48' (pen.); Al-Mawas 85'

Panaad Stadium, Bacolod
Attendance: 2,645
Referee: Jumpei Iida (Japan)

10 September 2019
15:30 UTC+10

Guam	1–4	Philippines
Lopez 67' (pen.)	Report (FIFA); Report (AFC)	Guirado 7'; Reichelt 12'; Schröck 71'; Strauß 81'

Guam F.A. National Training Center, Dededo
Attendance: 1,096
Referee: Kim Woo-sung (South Korea)
10 September 2019
20:00 UTC+5

Maldives	0–5	China
	Report (FIFA); Report (AFC)	Wu Xi 34'; Wu Lei 45'; Yang Xu 64' (pen.); Elkeson 83' (pen.), 90+1'

National Football Stadium, Malé
Attendance: 3,700
Referee: Turki Al-Khudhayr (Saudi Arabia)

10 October 2019
20:00 UTC+8

China	7–0	Guam
Yang Xu 6', 19', 24', 31'; Wu Lei 17'; Wu Xi 45+1'; Elkeson 75'	Report (FIFA); Report (AFC)

Tianhe Stadium, Guangzhou
Attendance: 39,987
Referee: Ali Reda (Lebanon)
10 October 2019
18:00 UTC+4

Syria	2–1	Maldives
Al Somah 26', 60'	Report (FIFA); Report (AFC)	Ashfaq 70'

Rashid Stadium, Dubai (United Arab Emirates) (Note: Syria played their home matches in the United Arab Emirates because of security concerns from the Syrian civil war.)
Attendance: 5,500
Referee: Nazmi Nasaruddin (Malaysia)

15 October 2019
20:00 UTC+8

Philippines	0–0	China
	Report (FIFA); Report (AFC)

Panaad Stadium, Bacolod
Attendance: 2,982
Referee: Aziz Asimov (Uzbekistan)
15 October 2019 (Note: The fixtures between Guam and Syria were reversed from their original scheduled dates as the process for Syrian players to obtain United States visas would not be completed in time.)
18:00 UTC+4

Syria	4–0	Guam
Al Somah 3', 44', 83'; Al-Mawas 90+3'	Report (FIFA); Report (AFC)

Maktoum bin Rashid Al Maktoum Stadium, Dubai (United Arab Emirates)
Attendance: 2,050
Referee: Dmitriy Mashentsev (Kyrgyzstan)

14 November 2019
16:00 UTC+5

Maldives	1–2	Philippines
N. Hassan 90+3'	Report (FIFA); Report (AFC)	Ramsay 52'; Strauß 68'

National Football Stadium, Malé
Attendance: 2,700
Referee: Ahmed Al-Ali (Jordan)
14 November 2019
18:00 UTC+4

Syria	2–1	China
Omari 19'; Zhang Linpeng 76' (o.g.)	Report (FIFA); Report (AFC)	Wu Lei 30'

Maktoum bin Rashid Al Maktoum Stadium, Dubai (United Arab Emirates)
Attendance: 6,950
Referee: Kim Dae-yong (South Korea)

19 November 2019
16:00 UTC+5

Maldives	3–1	Guam
Samooh 23'; T. Nicklaw 38' (o.g.); Ashfaq 90+1'	Report (FIFA); Report (AFC)	Matkin 49'

National Football Stadium, Malé
Attendance: 2,612
Referee: Hussein Abo Yehia (Lebanon)
19 November 2019
18:00 UTC+4

Syria	1–0	Philippines
Al Salama 23'	Report (FIFA); Report (AFC)

Maktoum bin Rashid Al Maktoum Stadium, Dubai (United Arab Emirates)
Attendance: 2,445
Referee: Rowan Arumughan (India)

30 May 2021 (Note: Originally to be played on 31 March 2020, the match was postponed and rescheduled multiple times due to the COVID-19 pandemic in Asia.)
19:30 UTC+8

Guam	0–7	China
	Report (FIFA); Report (AFC)	Wu Lei 20' (pen.), 55'; Jin Jingdao 39'; Wu Xi 61'; Elkeson 65'; Alan 83', 87'

Suzhou Olympic Sports Centre, Suzhou (China) (Note: The matches played in May and June 2021 were held in a single centralised venue chosen per group.)
Attendance: 29,222
Referee: Sivakorn Pu-udom (Thailand)

4 June 2021
20:00 UTC+4

Maldives	0–4	Syria
	Report (FIFA); Report (AFC)	Al-Mawas 29', 45+2' (pen.), 71' (pen.); Aosman 33' (pen.)

Sharjah Stadium, Sharjah (United Arab Emirates)
Attendance: 0
Referee: Ammar Al-Jeneibi (United Arab Emirates)

7 June 2021 (Note: Originally to be played on 4 June 2020, the match was postponed and rescheduled multiple times due to the COVID-19 pandemic in Asia.)
18:00 UTC+4

Guam	0–3	Syria
	Report (FIFA); Report (AFC)	Mardikian 6', 9'; Al-Mawas 84'

Sharjah Stadium, Sharjah (United Arab Emirates)
Attendance: 0
Referee: Khalid Al-Turais (Saudi Arabia)
7 June 2021
21:00 UTC+4

China	2–0	Philippines
Wu Lei 56' (pen.); Wu Xinghan 65'	Report (FIFA); Report (AFC)

Sharjah Stadium, Sharjah (United Arab Emirates)
Attendance: 0
Referee: Kim Hee-gon (South Korea)

11 June 2021 (Note: Originally to be played on 26 March 2020, the match was postponed and rescheduled multiple times due to the COVID-19 pandemic in Asia.)
18:00 UTC+4

Philippines	3–0	Guam
Guirado 12'; Lopez 60' (o.g.); Hartmann 88'	Report (FIFA); Report (AFC)

Sharjah Stadium, Sharjah (United Arab Emirates)
Attendance: 0
Referee: Ammar Al-Jeneibi (United Arab Emirates)
11 June 2021
21:00 UTC+4

China	5–0	Maldives
Liu Binbin 5'; Wu Lei 30'; Alan 68'; Zhang Yuning 69'; Tan Long 79'	Report (FIFA); Report (AFC)

Sharjah Stadium, Sharjah (United Arab Emirates)
Attendance: 0
Referee: Ahmed Al-Ali (Jordan)

15 June 2021 (Note: Originally to be played on 9 June 2020, the match was postponed and rescheduled multiple times due to the COVID-19 pandemic in Asia.)
19:00 UTC+4

Philippines	1–1	Maldives
Guirado 19'	Report (FIFA); Report (AFC)	Fasir 25'

Sharjah Stadium, Sharjah (United Arab Emirates)
Attendance: 0
Referee: Sivakorn Pu-udom (Thailand)
15 June 2021
22:00 UTC+4

China	3–1	Syria
Zhang Xizhe 43'; Wu Lei 69' (pen.); Zhang Yuning 90+3'	Report (FIFA); Report (AFC)	Aosman 50'

Sharjah Stadium, Sharjah (United Arab Emirates)
Attendance: 0
Referee: Muhammad Taqi (Singapore)

Goalscorers

There were 73 goals scored in 20 matches, for an average of 3.65 goals per match.

8 goals

- (China national football team) Wu Lei

7 goals

- (Syria national football team) Omar Al Somah

6 goals

- (Syria national football team) Mahmoud Al-Mawas

5 goals

- (China national football team) Yang Xu

4 goals

- (China national football team) Elkeson

3 goals

- (China national football team) Alan
- (China national football team) Wu Xi
- (Philippines national football team) Ángel Guirado

2 goals

- (China national football team) Zhang Yuning
- (Maldives national football team) Ali Ashfaq
- (Philippines national football team) John-Patrick Strauß
- (Syria national football team) Aias Aosman
- (Syria national football team) Mardik Mardikian

1 goal

- (China national football team) Jin Jingdao
- (China national football team) Liu Binbin
- (China national football team) Tan Long
- (China national football team) Wu Xinghan
- (China national football team) Zhang Xizhe
- (Guam national football team) Marcus Lopez
- (Guam national football team) John Matkin
- (Maldives national football team) Ali Fasir
- (Maldives national football team) Naiz Hassan
- (Maldives national football team) Ibrahim Mahudhee
- (Maldives national football team) Ali Samooh
- (Philippines national football team) Mark Hartmann
- (Philippines national football team) Mike Ott
- (Philippines national football team) Javier Patiño
- (Philippines national football team) Iain Ramsay
- (Philippines national football team) Patrick Reichelt
- (Philippines national football team) Stephan Schröck
- (Syria national football team) Firas Al-Khatib
- (Syria national football team) Ward Al Salama
- (Syria national football team) Khaled Mobayed
- (Syria national football team) Osama Omari

1 own goal

- (China national football team) Zhang Linpeng (against Syria)
- (Guam national football team) Marcus Lopez (against Philippines)
- (Guam national football team) Travis Nicklaw (against Maldives)

== Group B ==
Pos	Team	Pld	W	D	L	GF	GA	GD	Pts	Qualification	Australia	Kuwait	Jordan	Nepal	Chinese Taipei for Olympic games
1	Australia	8	8	0	0	28	2	+26	24	World Cup qualifying third round and Asian Cup	—	3–0	1–0	5–0	5–1
2	Kuwait	8	4	2	2	19	7	+12	14	Asian Cup qualifying third round	0–3	—	0–0	7–0	9–0
3	Jordan	8	4	2	2	13	3	+10	14	Asian Cup qualifying third round	0–1	0–0	—	3–0	5–0
4	Nepal	8	2	0	6	4	22	−18	6	Asian Cup qualifying third round	0–3	0–1	0–3	—	2–0
5	Chinese Taipei	8	0	0	8	4	34	−30	0	Asian Cup qualifying play-off round	1–7	1–2	1–2	0–2	—

Source: FIFA
Rules for classification: Qualification tiebreakers
5 September 2019
19:10 UTC+8

Chinese Taipei	1–2	Jordan
Wen Chih-hao 81'	Report (FIFA); Report (AFC)	Faisal 19'; Samir 37'

Taipei Municipal Stadium, Taipei
Attendance: 5,520
Referee: Yusuke Araki (Japan)
5 September 2019 (Note: The home matches of Nepal against Chinese Taipei, Jordan and Kuwait were swapped with the away matches at the request of the All Nepal Football Association with consent from the opponents. The only Nepali stadium that meets the required criteria for this competition is the Dasarath Rangasala, which was damaged in the April 2015 Nepal earthquake, and would not be repaired in time.)
20:00 UTC+3

Kuwait	7–0	Nepal
Nasser 6', 50'; Al Hajeri 13'; Mawei 59'; Al-Mutawa 67'; Abujabarah 90+4'; Al-Musawi 90+7'	Report (FIFA); Report (AFC)

Al Kuwait Sports Club Stadium, Kuwait City
Attendance: 7,500
Referee: Kim Dae-yong (South Korea)

10 September 2019
19:10 UTC+8

Chinese Taipei	0–2	Nepal
	Report (FIFA); Report (AFC)	Bista 4', 62'

Taipei Municipal Stadium, Taipei
Attendance: 4,780
Referee: Yaqoob Abdul Baki (Oman)
10 September 2019
18:30 UTC+3

Kuwait	0–3	Australia
	Report (FIFA); Report (AFC)	Leckie 7', 30'; Mooy 38'

Al Kuwait Sports Club Stadium, Kuwait City
Attendance: 11,852
Referee: Muhammad Taqi (Singapore)

10 October 2019
20:00 UTC+11

Australia	5–0	Nepal
Maclaren 6', 19', 90'; Souttar 23', 59'	Report (FIFA); Report (AFC)

Canberra Stadium, Canberra
Attendance: 18,563
Referee: Thoriq Alkatiri (Indonesia)
10 October 2019
19:00 UTC+3

Jordan	0–0	Kuwait
	Report (FIFA); Report (AFC)

Amman International Stadium, Amman
Attendance: 10,720
Referee: Ryuji Sato (Japan)

15 October 2019
19:40 UTC+8

Chinese Taipei	1–7	Australia
Chen Yi-wei 21'	Report (FIFA); Report (AFC)	Taggart 12', 19'; Irvine 34', 37'; Souttar 73', 89'; Maclaren 84'

National Stadium, Kaohsiung
Attendance: 3,251
Referee: Mongkolchai Pechsri (Thailand)
15 October 2019
19:00 UTC+3

Jordan	3–0	Nepal
Shelbaieh 56' (pen.); Ersan 78'; Faisal 88'	Report (FIFA); Report (AFC)

Amman International Stadium, Amman
Attendance: 4,863
Referee: Sadullo Gulmurodi (Tajikistan)

14 November 2019
19:00 UTC+3

Kuwait	9–0	Chinese Taipei
Nasser 22', 59'; Al Ansari 42'; Al-Faneeni 49'; Al-Mutawa 55'; Zayid 62'; Al-Khaldi 73'; Chen Wei-chuan 77' (o.g.); Ajab 81'	Report (FIFA); Report (AFC)

Al Kuwait Sports Club Stadium, Kuwait City
Attendance: 8,400
Referee: Mohd Amirul Izwan Yaacob (Malaysia)
14 November 2019
18:00 UTC+2

Jordan	0–1	Australia
	Report (FIFA); Report (AFC)	Taggart 13'

King Abdullah II Stadium, Amman
Attendance: 9,712
Referee: Fu Ming (China)

19 November 2019
15:00 UTC+6

Nepal	0–1	Kuwait
	Report (FIFA); Report (AFC)	Al-Mutawa 28'

Changlimithang Stadium, Thimphu (Bhutan) (Note: After previously swapping the home fixtures with other teams in the group due to Dasarath Rangasala, Kathmandu not being able to be repaired in time, Nepal then played their home fixtures at Changlimithang Stadium, Thimphu, Bhutan due to the AFC citing that the Dasarath Rangasala Stadium has poor infrastructure.)
Attendance: 2,000
Referee: Omar Al-Yaqoubi (Oman)
19 November 2019
18:00 UTC+2

Jordan	5–0	Chinese Taipei
Faisal 4', 75'; Ersan 25'; Al-Ajalin 43'; Al-Dardour 62'	Report (FIFA); Report (AFC)

King Abdullah II Stadium, Amman
Attendance: 2,260
Referee: Mohammed Abdulla Hassan Mohamed (United Arab Emirates)

3 June 2021
19:00 UTC+3

Nepal	2–0	Chinese Taipei
An. Bista 3' (pen.); N. Shrestha 80'	Report (FIFA); Report (AFC)

Al Kuwait Sports Club Stadium, Kuwait City (Kuwait)
Attendance: 0
Referee: Kim Woo-sung (South Korea)
3 June 2021
22:00 UTC+3

Australia	3–0	Kuwait
Leckie 1'; Irvine 24'; Hrustic 66'	Report (FIFA); Report (AFC)

Jaber Al-Ahmad International Stadium, Kuwait City (Kuwait)
Attendance: 0
Referee: Jumpei Iida (Japan)

7 June 2021
19:00 UTC+3

Nepal	0–3	Jordan
	Report (FIFA); Report (AFC)	Faisal 23' (pen.), 48'; Al-Arab 67'

Al Kuwait Sports Club Stadium, Kuwait City (Kuwait)
Attendance: 0
Referee: Mohd Amirul Izwan Yaacob (Malaysia)
7 June 2021
22:00 UTC+3

Australia	5–1	Chinese Taipei
Souttar 12'; Maclaren 27' (pen.); Sainsbury 41'; Duke 46', 84'	Report (FIFA); Report (AFC)	Gao Wei-jie 62'

Jaber Al-Ahmad International Stadium, Kuwait City (Kuwait)
Attendance: 0
Referee: Saoud Al-Adba (Qatar)

11 June 2021
19:00 UTC+3

Nepal	0–3	Australia
	Report (FIFA); Report (AFC)	Leckie 6'; Karačić 38'; Boyle 57'

Jaber Al-Ahmad International Stadium, Kuwait City (Kuwait)
Attendance: 0
Referee: Ahmed Al-Kaf (Oman)
11 June 2021
22:00 UTC+3

Kuwait	0–0	Jordan
	Report (FIFA); Report (AFC)

Jaber Al-Ahmad International Stadium, Kuwait City
Attendance: 0
Referee: Nawaf Shukralla (Bahrain)

15 June 2021
19:00 UTC+3

Australia	1–0	Jordan
Souttar 77'	Report (FIFA); Report (AFC)

Jaber Al-Ahmad International Stadium, Kuwait City (Kuwait)
Attendance: 0
Referee: Kim Woo-Sung (South Korea)
15 June 2021
22:00 UTC+3

Chinese Taipei	1–2	Kuwait
Wu Chun-ching 51'	Report (FIFA); Report (AFC)	Nasser 14', 71'

Jaber Al-Ahmad International Stadium, Kuwait City (Kuwait)
Attendance: 0
Referee: Ahmed Al-Kaf (Oman)

Goalscorers

There were 68 goals scored in 20 matches, for an average of 3.4 goals per match.

6 goals

- (Australia men's national soccer team) Harry Souttar
- (Jordan national football team) Baha' Faisal
- (Kuwait national football team) Yousef Nasser

5 goals

- (Australia men's national soccer team) Jamie Maclaren

4 goals

- (Australia men's national soccer team) Mathew Leckie

3 goals

- (Australia men's national soccer team) Jackson Irvine
- (Australia men's national soccer team) Adam Taggart
- (Kuwait national football team) Bader Al-Mutawa
- (Nepal national football team) Anjan Bista

2 goals

- (Australia men's national soccer team) Mitchell Duke
- (Jordan national football team) Ahmad Ersan

1 goal

- (Australia men's national soccer team) Martin Boyle
- (Australia men's national soccer team) Ajdin Hrustic
- (Australia men's national soccer team) Fran Karacic
- (Australia men's national soccer team) Aaron Mooy
- (Australia men's national soccer team) Trent Sainsbury
- (Chinese Taipei national football team) Chen Yi-wei
- (Chinese Taipei national football team) Gao Wei-jie
- (Chinese Taipei national football team) Wen Chih-hao
- (Chinese Taipei national football team) Wu Chun-ching
- (Jordan national football team) Salem Al-Ajalin
- (Jordan national football team) Yazan Al-Arab
- (Jordan national football team) Hamza Al-Dardour
- (Jordan national football team) Ahmed Samir
- (Jordan national football team) Feras Shelbaieh
- (Kuwait national football team) Redha Abujabarah
- (Kuwait national football team) Faisal Ajab Al-Azemi
- (Kuwait national football team) Mobarak Al-Faneeni
- (Kuwait national football team) Shabib Al-Khaldi
- (Kuwait national football team) Hussain Al-Musawi
- (Kuwait national football team) Fahad Al Ansari
- (Kuwait national football team) Fahad Al Hajeri
- (Kuwait national football team) Abdullah Mawei
- (Kuwait national football team) Faisal Zayid
- (Nepal national football team) Nawayug Shrestha

1 own goal

- (Chinese Taipei national football team) Chen Wei-chuan (against Kuwait)

== Group C ==
Pos	Team	Pld	W	D	L	GF	GA	GD	Pts	Qualification	Iran	Iraq	Bahrain	Hong Kong	Cambodia
1	Iran	8	6	0	2	34	4	+30	18	World Cup qualifying third round and Asian Cup	—	1–0	3–0	3–1	14–0
2	Iraq	8	5	2	1	14	4	+10	17	World Cup qualifying third round and Asian Cup	2–1	—	0–0	2–0	4–1
3	Bahrain	8	4	3	1	15	4	+11	15	Asian Cup qualifying third round	1–0	1–1	—	4–0	8–0
4	Hong Kong	8	1	2	5	4	13	−9	5	Asian Cup qualifying third round	0–2	0–1	0–0	—	2–0
5	Cambodia	8	0	1	7	2	44	−42	1	Asian Cup qualifying play-off round	0–10	0–4	0–1	1–1	—

Source: FIFA
Rules for classification: Qualification tiebreakers
5 September 2019
18:30 UTC+7

Cambodia	1–1	Hong Kong
Sokpheng 33'	Report (FIFA); Report (AFC)	Tan Chun Lok 16'

Olympic Stadium, Phnom Penh
Attendance: 45,500
Referee: Ilgiz Tantashev (Uzbekistan)
5 September 2019
19:30 UTC+3

Bahrain	1–1	Iraq
Al Aswad 9'	Report (FIFA); Report (AFC)	M. Ali 85'

Bahrain National Stadium, Riffa
Attendance: 6,049
Referee: Omar Al-Yaqoubi (Oman)

10 September 2019
18:30 UTC+7

Cambodia	0–1	Bahrain
	Report (FIFA); Report (AFC)	Al Aswad 78'

Olympic Stadium, Phnom Penh
Attendance: 45,000
Referee: Nivon Robesh Gamini (Sri Lanka)
10 September 2019
20:00 UTC+8

Hong Kong	0–2	Iran
	Report (FIFA); Report (AFC)	Azmoun 23'; Ansarifard 54'

Hong Kong Stadium, Hong Kong
Attendance: 13,942
Referee: Yudai Yamamoto (Japan)

10 October 2019
17:00 UTC+3:30

Iran	14–0	Cambodia
Nourollahi 5'; Azmoun 11', 35', 44'; Kanaanizadegan 18'; Visal 22' (o.g.); Ansarifard 40', 48', 60', 88'; Taremi 54'; Mohebi 65', 67'; Me. Mohammadi 85'	Report (FIFA); Report (AFC)

Azadi Stadium, Tehran
Attendance: 15,823
Referee: Pranjal Banerjee (India)
10 October 2019
19:00 UTC+3

Iraq	2–0	Hong Kong
M. Ali 37'; Adnan 79' (pen.)	Report (FIFA); Report (AFC)

Basra International Stadium, Basra
Attendance: 32,340
Referee: Ammar Al-Jeneibi (United Arab Emirates)

15 October 2019
18:30 UTC+7

Cambodia	0–4	Iraq
	Report (FIFA); Report (AFC)	Bayesh 22'; M. Ali 41'; Attwan 57'; Ibrahim 62'

Olympic Stadium, Phnom Penh
Attendance: 48,258
Referee: Clifford Daypuyat (Philippines)
15 October 2019
19:30 UTC+3

Bahrain	1–0	Iran
Al-Hardan 65' (pen.)	Report (FIFA); Report (AFC)

Bahrain National Stadium, Riffa
Attendance: 14,810
Referee: Valentin Kovalenko (Uzbekistan)

14 November 2019
20:00 UTC+8

Hong Kong	0–0	Bahrain
	Report (FIFA); Report (AFC)

Hong Kong Stadium, Hong Kong
Attendance: 4,541
Referee: Kim Dong-jin (South Korea)
14 November 2019
16:00 UTC+2

Iraq	2–1	Iran
M. Ali 11'; Abbas 90+2'	Report (FIFA); Report (AFC)	Nourollahi 25'

Amman International Stadium, Amman (Jordan) (Note: Following an assessment of the security situation in Iraq due to the 2019–2021 Iraqi protests, FIFA and AFC directed the Iraq Football Association to shift their home matches against Iran and Bahrain from the Basra International Stadium, Basra to a neutral ground. The AFC later announced that the matches had been shifted to Amman International Stadium, Amman, Jordan.)
Attendance: 13,752
Referee: Hettikamkanamge Perera (Sri Lanka)

19 November 2019
20:00 UTC+8

Hong Kong	2–0	Cambodia
Ha 20'; Roberto 83'	Report (FIFA); Report (AFC)

Hong Kong Stadium, Hong Kong
Attendance: 6,497
Referee: Ali Shaban (Kuwait)
19 November 2019
16:00 UTC+2

Iraq	0–0	Bahrain
	Report (FIFA); Report (AFC)

Amman International Stadium, Amman (Jordan)
Attendance: 10,366
Referee: Muhammad Taqi (Singapore)

3 June 2021
17:30 UTC+3

Iran	3–1	Hong Kong
Gholizadeh 23'; Amiri 61'; Ansarifard 84'	Report (FIFA); Report (AFC)	Cheng Siu Kwan 85'

Al Muharraq Stadium, Arad (Bahrain)
Attendance: 0
Referee: Adham Makhadmeh (Jordan)
3 June 2021
19:30 UTC+3

Bahrain	8–0	Cambodia
Al Aswad 8', 71'; Al-Romaihi 45+2'; Madan 46', 65'; Al-Shaikh 51'; Abdullatif 75', 90+2'	Report (FIFA); Report (AFC)

Bahrain National Stadium, Riffa
Attendance: 0
Referee: Hiroyuki Kimura (Japan)

7 June 2021
17:30 UTC+3

Iraq	4–1	Cambodia
M. Ali 1'; Resan 23'; Adnan 27' (pen.); Hadi 90+3'	Report (FIFA); Report (AFC)	Visal 55'

Al Muharraq Stadium, Arad (Bahrain)
Attendance: 0
Referee: Yaqoob Abdul Baki (Oman)
7 June 2021
19:30 UTC+3

Iran	3–0	Bahrain
Azmoun 54', 61'; Taremi 79'	Report (FIFA); Report (AFC)

Bahrain National Stadium, Riffa (Bahrain)
Attendance: 0
Referee: Fu Ming (China)

11 June 2021
17:30 UTC+3

Cambodia	0–10	Iran
	Report (FIFA); Report (AFC)	Jahanbakhsh 16' (pen.); Khalilzadeh 22'; Taremi 27'; Rotana 32' (o.g.); Mohammadi 58'; Pouraliganji 64'; Ansarifard 77' (pen.); Rezaei 80', 87'; Ghayedi 84'

Bahrain National Stadium, Riffa (Bahrain)
Attendance: 0
Referee: Kim Jong-hyeok (South Korea)
11 June 2021
19:30 UTC+3

Hong Kong	0–1	Iraq
	Report (FIFA); Report (AFC)	Fung Hing Wa 11' (o.g.)

Al Muharraq Stadium, Arad (Bahrain)
Attendance: 0
Referee: Hiroyuki Kimura (Japan)

15 June 2021
19:30 UTC+3

Iran	1–0	Iraq
Azmoun 35'	Report (FIFA); Report (AFC)

Al Muharraq Stadium, Arad (Bahrain)
Attendance: 0
Referee: Ilgiz Tantashev (Uzbekistan)
15 June 2021
19:30 UTC+3

Bahrain	4–0	Hong Kong
Saeed 49'; Isa 54' (pen.), 70'; Abdullatif 90' (pen.)	Report (FIFA); Report (AFC)

Bahrain National Stadium, Riffa
Attendance: 0
Referee: Yaqoob Abdul Baki (Oman)

Goalscorers

There were 69 goals scored in 20 matches, for an average of 3.45 goals per match.

7 goals

- (Iran national football team) Karim Ansarifard
- (Iran national football team) Sardar Azmoun

5 goals

- (Iraq national football team) Mohanad Ali

4 goals

- (Bahrain national football team) Kamil Al-Aswad

3 goals

- (Bahrain national football team) Ismail Abdullatif
- (Iran national football team) Mehdi Taremi

2 goals

- (Bahrain national football team) Hashim Sayed Isa
- (Bahrain national football team) Ali Madan
- (Iran national football team) Mohammad Mohebi
- (Iran national football team) Ahmad Nourollahi
- (Iran national football team) Kaveh Rezaei
- (Iraq national football team) Ali Adnan Kadhim

1 goal

- (Bahrain national football team) Mohammed Al-Hardan
- (Bahrain national football team) Mohamed Al-Romaihi
- (Bahrain national football team) Jasim Al-Shaikh
- (Bahrain national football team) Sayed Dhiya Saeed
- (Cambodia national football team) Keo Sokpheng
- (Cambodia national football team) Soeuy Visal
- (Hong Kong national football team) Cheng Siu Kwan
- (Hong Kong national football team) James Ha
- (Hong Kong national football team) Roberto
- (Hong Kong national football team) Tan Chun Lok
- (Iran national football team) Vahid Amiri
- (Iran national football team) Mehdi Ghayedi
- (Iran national football team) Ali Gholizadeh
- (Iran national football team) Alireza Jahanbakhsh
- (Iran national football team) Hossein Kanaanizadegan
- (Iran national football team) Shojae Khalilzadeh
- (Iran national football team) Mehrdad Mohammadi
- (Iran national football team) Milad Mohammadi
- (Iran national football team) Morteza Pouraliganji
- (Iraq national football team) Alaa Abbas
- (Iraq national football team) Amjad Attwan
- (Iraq national football team) Ibrahim Bayesh
- (Iraq national football team) Safaa Hadi
- (Iraq national football team) Ahmed Ibrahim Khalaf
- (Iraq national football team) Bashar Resan

1 own goal

- (Cambodia national football team) Soeuy Visal (against Iran)
- (Cambodia national football team) Sor Rotana (against Iran)
- (Hong Kong national football team) Fung Hing Wa (against Iraq)

== Group D ==
Pos	Team	Pld	W	D	L	GF	GA	GD	Pts	Qualification	Saudi Arabia	Uzbekistan	Palestine	Singapore	Yemen
1	Saudi Arabia	8	6	2	0	22	4	+18	20	World Cup qualifying third round and Asian Cup	—	3–0	5–0	3–0	3–0
2	Uzbekistan	8	5	0	3	18	9	+9	15	Asian Cup qualifying third round	2–3	—	2–0	5–0	5–0
3	Palestine	8	3	1	4	10	10	0	10	Asian Cup qualifying third round	0–0	2–0	—	4–0	3–0
4	Singapore	8	2	1	5	7	22	−15	7	Asian Cup qualifying third round	0–3	1–3	2–1	—	2–2
5	Yemen	8	1	2	5	6	18	−12	5	Asian Cup qualifying third round	2–2	0–1	1–0	1–2	—

Source: FIFA
Rules for classification: Qualification tiebreakers
5 September 2019
19:45 UTC+8

Singapore	2–2	Yemen
Ikhsan 27'; Faris 52'	Report (FIFA); Report (AFC)	Al-Matari 34'; Qarawi 45'

National Stadium, Singapore
Attendance: 7,018
Referee: Shaun Evans (Australia)
5 September 2019
17:00 UTC+3

Palestine	2–0	Uzbekistan
Dabbagh 60'; Batran 85'	Report (FIFA); Report (AFC)

Faisal Al-Husseini International Stadium, Al-Ram
Attendance: 6,740
Referee: Fu Ming (China)

10 September 2019
19:45 UTC+8

Singapore	2–1	Palestine
Shakir 3'; Safuwan 38'	Report (FIFA); Report (AFC)	Hamed 13'

Jalan Besar Stadium, Singapore
Attendance: 6,011
Referee: Yu Ming-hsun (Chinese Taipei)
10 September 2019
19:00 UTC+3

Yemen	2–2	Saudi Arabia
Qarawi 8'; Al-Dahi 37'	Report (FIFA); Report (AFC)	Bahebri 23'; Al-Dawsari 48'

Bahrain National Stadium, Riffa (Bahrain) (Note: Yemen played their home matches in Bahrain because of security concerns from the Yemeni Civil War.)
Attendance: 3,100
Referee: Sivakorn Pu-udom (Thailand)

10 October 2019
17:00 UTC+5

Uzbekistan	5–0	Yemen
Kodirkulov 3'; Shomurodov 33'; Iskanderov 53'; Tukhtakhujaev 72'; Sergeev 90'	Report (FIFA); Report (AFC)

Pakhtakor Central Stadium, Tashkent
Attendance: 28,571
Referee: Hanna Hattab (Syria)
10 October 2019
20:00 UTC+3

Saudi Arabia	3–0	Singapore
Asiri 28', 67'; Al-Hamdan 61'	Report (FIFA); Report (AFC)

King Abdullah Sport City Stadium, Buraidah
Attendance: 14,560
Referee: Kim Hee-gon (South Korea)

15 October 2019
19:45 UTC+8

Singapore	1–3	Uzbekistan
Ikhsan 45+1'	Report (FIFA); Report (AFC)	Ahmedov 15'; Shomurodov 51', 90+2'

National Stadium, Singapore
Attendance: 12,547
Referee: Shen Yinhao (China)
15 October 2019
16:00 UTC+3

Palestine	0–0	Saudi Arabia
	Report (FIFA); Report (AFC)

Faisal Al-Husseini International Stadium, Al-Ram
Attendance: 12,000
Referee: Ahmed Al-Kaf (Oman)

14 November 2019
17:00 UTC+5

Uzbekistan	2–3	Saudi Arabia
Shomurodov 16'; Shukurov 56' (pen.)	Report (FIFA); Report (AFC)	Al-Faraj 23' (pen.), 85'; Al-Dawsari 89'

Pakhtakor Central Stadium, Tashkent
Attendance: 31,524
Referee: Ryuji Sato (Japan)
14 November 2019
18:00 UTC+3

Yemen	1–0	Palestine
Al-Dahi 54'	Report (FIFA); Report (AFC)

Sheikh Ali Bin Mohamad Stadium, Muharraq (Bahrain)
Attendance: 530
Referee: Adham Makhadmeh (Jordan)

19 November 2019
17:00 UTC+5

Uzbekistan	2–0	Palestine
Shomurodov 18', 58'	Report (FIFA); Report (AFC)

Pakhtakor Central Stadium, Tashkent
Attendance: 19,143
Referee: Nawaf Shukralla (Bahrain)
19 November 2019
18:00 UTC+3

Yemen	1–2	Singapore
Al-Gahwashi 85'	Report (FIFA); Report (AFC)	Ikhsan 19'; Hafiz 52'

Sheikh Ali Bin Mohamad Stadium, Muharraq (Bahrain)
Attendance: 650
Referee: Minoru Tōjō (Japan)

30 March 2021
20:30 UTC+3

Saudi Arabia	5–0	Palestine
Al-Shahrani 37'; Al-Muwallad 43'; Al-Shehri 52', 58'; S. Al-Dawsari 88' (pen.)	Report (FIFA); Report (AFC)

King Saud University Stadium, Riyadh
Attendance: 1
Referee: Mohanad Qasim (Iraq)

3 June 2021
21:00 UTC+3

Palestine	4–0	Singapore
Seyam 19' (pen.), 30' (pen.); Dabbagh 23'; Hamed 85'	Report (FIFA); Report (AFC)

King Fahd International Stadium, Riyadh (Saudi Arabia)
Attendance: 294
Referee: Mohammed Abdulla Hassan Mohamed (United Arab Emirates)

5 June 2021
21:00 UTC+3

Saudi Arabia	3–0	Yemen
Al-Dawsari 4'; Al-Muwallad 17', 32'	Report (FIFA); Report (AFC)

King Saud University Stadium, Riyadh
Attendance: 4,382
Referee: Nivon Robesh Gamini (Sri Lanka)

7 June 2021
21:00 UTC+3

Uzbekistan	5–0	Singapore
Masharipov 6', 34'; Shomurodov 45+1'; Ahmedov 50'; Irfan 88' (o.g.)	Report (FIFA); Report (AFC)

King Fahd International Stadium, Riyadh (Saudi Arabia)
Attendance: 75
Referee: Ali Abdulnabi (Bahrain)

11 June 2021
21:00 UTC+3

Yemen	0–1	Uzbekistan
	Report (FIFA); Report (AFC)	Masharipov 19' (pen.)

King Fahd International Stadium, Riyadh (Saudi Arabia)
Attendance: 230
Referee: Mohammed Abdulla Hassan Mohamed (United Arab Emirates)
11 June 2021
21:00 UTC+3

Singapore	0–3	Saudi Arabia
	Report (FIFA); Report (AFC)	Al-Dawsari 84'; Al-Muwallad 86'; Al-Shehri 90+6'

King Saud University Stadium, Riyadh (Saudi Arabia)
Attendance: 4,879
Referee: Mohanad Qasim (Iraq)

15 June 2021
21:00 UTC+3

Saudi Arabia	3–0	Uzbekistan
Al-Faraj 25', 33'; Al-Hassan 52'	Report (FIFA); Report (AFC)

King Saud University Stadium, Riyadh
Attendance: 6,339
Referee: Ko Hyung-jin (South Korea)
15 June 2021
21:00 UTC+3

Palestine	3–0	Yemen
Dabbagh 43', 84'; Hamed 45+3'	Report (FIFA); Report (AFC)

King Fahd International Stadium, Riyadh (Saudi Arabia)
Attendance: 430
Referee: Masoud Tufayelieh (Syria)

Goalscorers

There were 62 goals scored in 20 matches, for an average of 3.1 goals per match.

7 goals

- (Uzbekistan national football team) Eldor Shomurodov

5 goals

- (Saudi Arabia national football team) Salem Al-Dawsari

4 goals

- (Palestine national football team) Oday Dabbagh
- (Saudi Arabia national football team) Salman Al-Faraj
- (Saudi Arabia national football team) Fahad Al-Muwallad

3 goals

- (Palestine national football team) Yaser Hamed
- (Saudi Arabia national football team) Saleh Al-Shehri
- (Singapore national football team) Ikhsan Fandi
- (Uzbekistan national football team) Jaloliddin Masharipov

2 goals

- (Palestine national football team) Tamer Seyam
- (Saudi Arabia national football team) Abdulfattah Asiri
- (Uzbekistan national football team) Odil Ahmedov
- (Yemen national football team) Omar Al-Dahi
- (Yemen national football team) Mohsen Qarawi

1 goal

- (Palestine national football team) Islam Batran
- (Saudi Arabia national football team) Abdullah Al-Hamdan
- (Saudi Arabia national football team) Ali Al-Hassan
- (Saudi Arabia national football team) Yasser Al-Shahrani
- (Saudi Arabia national football team) Hattan Bahebri
- (Singapore national football team) Faris Ramli
- (Singapore national football team) Hafiz Nor
- (Singapore national football team) Safuwan Baharudin
- (Singapore national football team) Shakir Hamzah
- (Uzbekistan national football team) Jamshid Iskanderov
- (Uzbekistan national football team) Sanjar Kodirkulov
- (Uzbekistan national football team) Igor Sergeev
- (Uzbekistan national football team) Otabek Shukurov
- (Uzbekistan national football team) Islom Tukhtakhujaev
- (Yemen national football team) Nasser Al-Gahwashi
- (Yemen national football team) Abdulwasea Al-Matari

== Group E ==
Pos	Team	Pld	W	D	L	GF	GA	GD	Pts	Qualification	Qatar	Oman	India	Afghanistan	Bangladesh
1	Qatar (Note: Qatar has already qualified for the World Cup as the host nation. They are later selected as host replacement within the qualified teams of the Asian Cup.)	8	7	1	0	18	1	+17	22	Asian Cup	—	2–1	0–0	6–0	5–0
2	Oman	8	6	0	2	16	6	+10	18	World Cup qualifying third round and Asian Cup	0–1	—	1–0	3–0	4–1
3	India	8	1	4	3	6	7	−1	7	Asian Cup qualifying third round	0–1	1–2	—	1–1	1–1
4	Afghanistan	8	1	3	4	5	15	−10	6	Asian Cup qualifying third round	0–1	1–2	1–1	—	1–0
5	Bangladesh	8	0	2	6	3	19	−16	2	Asian Cup qualifying third round	0–2	0–3	0–2	1–1	—

Source: FIFA
Rules for classification: Qualification tiebreakers
Notes:

The group spots of Qatar and Bangladesh were swapped due to Qatar's planned participation in the 2020 Copa América. The tournament was later deferred (becoming the 2021 Copa América), and eventually Qatar withdrew from it.

5 September 2019
19:30 UTC+5:30

India	1–2	Oman
Chhetri 24'	Report (FIFA); Report (AFC)	Al-Alawi 82', 90'

Indira Gandhi Athletic Stadium, Guwahati
Attendance: 22,798
Referee: Mooud Bonyadifar (Iran)
5 September 2019
19:30 UTC+3

Qatar	6–0	Afghanistan
A. Ali 4', 10', 51'; Al-Haydos 13'; Hassan 34'; Khoukhi 67'	Report (FIFA); Report (AFC)

Jassim bin Hamad Stadium, Al Rayyan
Attendance: 10,950
Referee: Aziz Asimov (Uzbekistan)

10 September 2019
19:00 UTC+5

Afghanistan	1–0	Bangladesh
Noor 27'	Report (FIFA); Report (AFC)

Central Republican Stadium, Dushanbe (Tajikistan) (Note: Afghanistan played their home matches in Tajikistan because of security concerns from the War in Afghanistan.)
Attendance: 5,000
Referee: Zhang Lei (China)
10 September 2019
19:30 UTC+3

Qatar	0–0	India
	Report (FIFA); Report (AFC)

Jassim bin Hamad Stadium, Al Rayyan
Attendance: 12,020
Referee: Nazmi Nasaruddin (Malaysia)

10 October 2019
19:00 UTC+6

Bangladesh	0–2	Qatar
	Report (FIFA); Report (AFC)	Abdurisag 28'; Boudiaf 90+2'

Bangabandhu National Stadium, Dhaka
Attendance: 24,570
Referee: Bijan Heidari (Iran)
10 October 2019
19:00 UTC+4

Oman	3–0	Afghanistan
Al-Muqbali 27', 38'; Al-Ghassani 61' (pen.)	Report (FIFA); Report (AFC)

Al-Seeb Stadium, Seeb
Attendance: 10,000
Referee: Ahmed Al-Ali (Jordan)

15 October 2019
19:30 UTC+5:30

India	1–1	Bangladesh
Khan 88'	Report (FIFA); Report (AFC)	Saad 42'

Salt Lake Stadium, Kolkata
Attendance: 53,286
Referee: Masoud Tufayelieh (Syria)
15 October 2019
19:30 UTC+3

Qatar	2–1	Oman
Ak. Afif 2'; Ali 71'	Report (FIFA); Report (AFC)	R. Al-Alawi 63'

Al Janoub Stadium, Al Wakrah
Attendance: 26,731
Referee: Fu Ming (China)

14 November 2019
19:00 UTC+5

Afghanistan	1–1	India
Nazary 45+1'	Report (FIFA); Report (AFC)	Doungel 90+3'

Central Republican Stadium, Dushanbe (Tajikistan)
Attendance: 8,100
Referee: Yu Ming-hsun (Chinese Taipei)
14 November 2019
19:00 UTC+4

Oman	4–1	Bangladesh
Al-Khaldi 48'; R. Al-Alawi 68'; A. Al-Alawi 78'; Al-Hidi 90+1'	Report (FIFA); Report (AFC)	Biplu 81'

Sultan Qaboos Sports Complex, Muscat
Attendance: 24,000
Referee: Hanna Hattab (Syria)

19 November 2019
19:00 UTC+5

Afghanistan	0–1	Qatar
	Report (FIFA); Report (AFC)	Afif 76' (pen.)

Central Republican Stadium, Dushanbe (Tajikistan)
Attendance: 6,000
Referee: Timur Faizullin (Kyrgyzstan)
19 November 2019
19:00 UTC+4

Oman	1–0	India
Al-Ghassani 33'	Report (FIFA); Report (AFC)

Sultan Qaboos Sports Complex, Muscat
Attendance: 24,250
Referee: Nivon Robesh Gamini (Sri Lanka)

4 December 2020 (Note: Originally to be played on 31 March 2020, the match was postponed and rescheduled multiple times due to the COVID-19 pandemic in Asia. The eventual date was approved by FIFA and the two national associations.)
19:00 UTC+3

Qatar	5–0	Bangladesh
Hatem 9'; Afif 33', 90+2'; Ali 72' (pen.), 78'	Report (FIFA); Report (AFC)

Jassim bin Hamad Stadium, Al Rayyan
Attendance: 1,044
Referee: Mohd Amirul Izwan Yaacob (Malaysia)

3 June 2021
17:00 UTC+3

Bangladesh	1–1	Afghanistan
Barman 83'	Report (FIFA); Report (AFC)	Sharifi 47'

Jassim bin Hamad Stadium, Al Rayyan (Qatar)
Attendance: 300
Referee: Mooud Bonyadifar (Iran)
3 June 2021
20:00 UTC+3

India	0–1	Qatar
	Report (FIFA); Report (AFC)	Hatem 33'

Jassim bin Hamad Stadium, Al Rayyan (Qatar)
Attendance: 2,022
Referee: Ma Ning (China)

7 June 2021
17:00 UTC+3

Bangladesh	0–2	India
	Report (FIFA); Report (AFC)	Chhetri 79', 90+2'

Jassim bin Hamad Stadium, Al Rayyan (Qatar)
Attendance: 495
Referee: Zaid Thamer (Iraq)
7 June 2021
20:00 UTC+3

Oman	0–1	Qatar
	Report (FIFA); Report (AFC)	Al-Haydos 39' (pen.)

Jassim bin Hamad Stadium, Al Rayyan (Qatar)
Attendance: 1,559
Referee: Hettikamkanamge Perera (Sri Lanka)

11 June 2021
20:10 UTC+3

Afghanistan	1–2	Oman
Popalzay 23'	Report (FIFA); Report (AFC)	Fawaz 13', 51'

Jassim bin Hamad Stadium, Al Rayyan (Qatar)
Attendance: 183
Referee: Ma Ning (China)

15 June 2021
17:00 UTC+3

India	1–1	Afghanistan
Azizi 75' (o.g.)	Report (FIFA); Report (AFC)	Zamani 81'

Jassim bin Hamad Stadium, Al Rayyan (Qatar)
Attendance: 603
Referee: Ali Reda (Lebanon)
15 June 2021
20:10 UTC+3

Bangladesh	0–3	Oman
	Report (FIFA); Report (AFC)	Al-Ghafri 22'; Al-Hajri 60', 80'

Jassim bin Hamad Stadium, Al Rayyan (Qatar)
Attendance: 885
Referee: Ali Shaban (Kuwait)

Goalscorers

There were 48 goals scored in 20 matches, for an average of 2.4 goals per match.

6 goals

- (Qatar national football team) Almoez Ali

4 goals

- (Oman national football team) Rabia Al-Alawi
- (Qatar national football team) Akram Afif

3 goals

- (India national football team) Sunil Chhetri

2 goals

- (Oman national football team) Muhsen Al-Ghassani
- (Oman national football team) Khalid Al-Hajri
- (Oman national football team) Abdul Aziz Al-Muqbali
- (Oman national football team) Abdullah Fawaz
- (Qatar national football team) Hassan Al-Haydos
- (Qatar national football team) Abdulaziz Hatem

1 goal

- (Afghanistan national football team) Zelfy Nazary
- (Afghanistan national football team) Farshad Noor
- (Afghanistan national football team) Omid Popalzay
- (Afghanistan national football team) Amredin Sharifi
- (Afghanistan national football team) Hossein Zamani
- (Bangladesh national football team) Biplu Ahmed
- (Bangladesh national football team) Topu Barman
- (Bangladesh national football team) Saad Uddin
- (India national football team) Seiminlen Doungel
- (India national football team) Adil Khan
- (Oman national football team) Arshad Al-Alawi
- (Oman national football team) Mohammed Al-Ghafri
- (Oman national football team) Amran Al-Hidi
- (Oman national football team) Mohsin Al-Khaldi
- (Qatar national football team) Yusuf Abdurisag
- (Qatar national football team) Karim Boudiaf
- (Qatar national football team) Abdelkarim Hassan
- (Qatar national football team) Boualem Khoukhi

1 own goal

- (Afghanistan national football team) Ovays Azizi (against India)

== Group F ==
Pos	Team	Pld	W	D	L	GF	GA	GD	Pts	Qualification	Japan	Tajikistan	Kyrgyzstan	Mongolia	Myanmar
1	Japan	8	8	0	0	46	2	+44	24	World Cup qualifying third round and Asian Cup	—	4–1	5–1	6–0	10–0
2	Tajikistan	8	4	1	3	14	12	+2	13	Asian Cup qualifying third round	0–3	—	1–0	3–0	4–0
3	Kyrgyzstan	8	3	1	4	19	12	+7	10	Asian Cup qualifying third round	0–2	1–1	—	0–1	7–0
4	Mongolia	8	2	0	6	3	27	−24	6	Asian Cup qualifying third round	0–14	0–1	1–2	—	1–0
5	Myanmar	8	2	0	6	6	35	−29	6	Asian Cup qualifying third round	0–2	4–3	1–8	1–0	—

Source: FIFA
Rules for classification: Qualification tiebreakers
5 September 2019
17:00 UTC+8

Mongolia	1–0	Myanmar
Amaraa 17'	Report (FIFA); Report (AFC)

MFF Football Centre, Ulaanbaatar
Attendance: 3,221
Referee: Rowan Arumughan (India)
5 September 2019
19:00 UTC+5

Tajikistan	1–0	Kyrgyzstan
A. Dzhalilov 41'	Report (FIFA); Report (AFC)

Central Republican Stadium, Dushanbe
Attendance: 17,800
Referee: Adham Makhadmeh (Jordan)

10 September 2019
17:00 UTC+8

Mongolia	0–1	Tajikistan
	Report (FIFA); Report (AFC)	D. Ergashev 81'

MFF Football Centre, Ulaanbaatar
Attendance: 3,455
Referee: Hanna Hattab (Syria)
10 September 2019
18:50 UTC+6:30

Myanmar	0–2	Japan
	Report (FIFA); Report (AFC)	Nakajima 16'; Minamino 26'

Thuwunna Stadium, Yangon
Attendance: 25,500
Referee: Ahmad Yacoub Ibrahim (Jordan)

10 October 2019
19:35 UTC+9

Japan	6–0	Mongolia
Minamino 22'; Yoshida 29'; Nagatomo 33'; Nagai 40'; Endo 57'; Kamada 82'	Report (FIFA); Report (AFC)

Saitama Stadium 2002, Saitama
Attendance: 43,122
Referee: Chae Sang-hyeop (South Korea)
10 October 2019
20:30 UTC+6

Kyrgyzstan	7–0	Myanmar
Bernhardt 5', 10', 87' (pen.); Shukurov 20', 71'; Alykulov 26'; Kichin 45'	Report (FIFA); Report (AFC)

Dolen Omurzakov Stadium, Bishkek
Attendance: 13,000
Referee: Omar Mohamed Al-Ali (United Arab Emirates)

15 October 2019
16:00 UTC+8

Mongolia	1–2	Kyrgyzstan
Tsedenbal 57' (pen.)	Report (FIFA); Report (AFC)	Alykulov 13'; Murzaev 42'

MFF Football Centre, Ulaanbaatar
Attendance: 2,182
Referee: Hussein Abo Yehia (Lebanon)
15 October 2019
17:15 UTC+5

Tajikistan	0–3	Japan
	Report (FIFA); Report (AFC)	Minamino 53', 55'; Asano 82'

Central Republican Stadium, Dushanbe
Attendance: 19,100
Referee: Zaid Thamer (Iraq)

14 November 2019
17:00 UTC+6:30

Myanmar	4–3	Tajikistan
Suan Lam Mang 10', 41'; Aung Thu 48'; Maung Maung Lwin 63'	Report (FIFA); Report (AFC)	M. Dzhalilov 36' (pen.), 76'; Vosiyev 57'

Mandalarthiri Stadium, Mandalay
Attendance: 7,365
Referee: Masoud Tufayelieh (Syria)
14 November 2019
17:18 UTC+6

Kyrgyzstan	0–2	Japan
	Report (FIFA); Report (AFC)	Minamino 41' (pen.); Haraguchi 54'

Dolen Omurzakov Stadium, Bishkek
Attendance: 17,543
Referee: Mohammed Al-Hoish (Saudi Arabia)

19 November 2019
17:00 UTC+6:30

Myanmar	1–0	Mongolia
Hlaing Bo Bo 17'	Report (FIFA); Report (AFC)

Mandalarthiri Stadium, Mandalay
Attendance: 17,468
Referee: Nazmi Nasaruddin (Malaysia)
19 November 2019
20:00 UTC+6

Kyrgyzstan	1–1	Tajikistan
Kozubaev 83'	Report (FIFA); Report (AFC)	Ergashev 17'

Dolen Omurzakov Stadium, Bishkek
Attendance: 15,873
Referee: Abdulrahman Al-Jassim (Qatar)

25 March 2021
18:00 UTC+5

Tajikistan	3–0	Mongolia
M. Dzhalilov 4'; A. Dzhalilov 50'; Samiev 87'	Report (FIFA); Report (AFC)

Central Republican Stadium, Dushanbe
Attendance: 9,300
Referee: Ali Sabah (Iraq)

30 March 2021
19:30 UTC+9

Mongolia	0–14	Japan
	Report (FIFA); Report (AFC)	Minamino 13'; Osako 23', 55', 90+2'; Kamada 26'; Morita 33'; Tuya 39' (o.g.); Inagaki 68', 90+3'; Itō 73', 79'; Furuhashi 78', 87'; Asano 90+1'

Fukuda Denshi Arena, Chiba (Japan) (Note: The Mongolia v Japan match was played in Japan due to COVID-19 restrictions in Mongolia.)
Attendance: 0
Referee: Omar Mohamed Al-Ali (United Arab Emirates)

28 May 2021
19:20 UTC+9

Japan	10–0	Myanmar
Minamino 8', 66'; Osako 22', 30' (pen.), 36', 49', 88'; Morita 57'; Kamada 84'; Itakura 90+1'	Report (FIFA); Report (AFC)

Fukuda Denshi Arena, Chiba
Attendance: 0
Referee: Hasan Akrami (Iran)

7 June 2021
16:00 UTC+9

Kyrgyzstan	0–1	Mongolia
	Report (FIFA); Report (AFC)	Mijiddorj 34'

Yanmar Stadium Nagai, Osaka (Japan)
Attendance: 0
Referee: Yu Ming-hsun (Chinese Taipei)
7 June 2021
19:30 UTC+9

Japan	4–1	Tajikistan
Furuhashi 6'; Minamino 40'; Hashimoto 51'; Kawabe 71'	Report (FIFA); Report (AFC)	Panjshanbe 9'

Panasonic Stadium Suita, Suita
Attendance: 0
Referee: Abdulrahman Al-Jassim (Qatar)

11 June 2021
16:00 UTC+9

Myanmar	1–8	Kyrgyzstan
Hlaing Bo Bo 69'	Report (FIFA); Report (AFC)	Rustamov 22'; Alykulov 29'; Musabekov 34'; Shukurov 45'; Murzaev 45+2', 61', 78'; Bokoleyev 63'

Yanmar Stadium Nagai, Osaka (Japan)
Attendance: 0
Referee: Hussein Abo Yehia (Lebanon)

15 June 2021
19:25 UTC+9

Japan	5–1	Kyrgyzstan
Onaiwu 27' (pen.), 31', 33'; Sasaki 72'; Asano 77'	Report (FIFA); Report (AFC)	Murzaev 45+2' (pen.)

Panasonic Stadium Suita, Suita
Attendance: 0
Referee: Omar Al-Yaqoubi (Oman)
15 June 2021
19:25 UTC+9

Tajikistan	4–0	Myanmar
Tursunov 34'; Dzhalilov 53'; Boboev 78'; Samiev 87'	Report (FIFA); Report (AFC)

Yanmar Stadium Nagai, Osaka (Japan)
Attendance: 0
Referee: Omar Mohamed Al-Ali (United Arab Emirates)

Goalscorers

There were 88 goals scored in 20 matches, for an average of 4.4 goals per match.

9 goals

- (Japan national football team) Takumi Minamino

8 goals

- (Japan national football team) Yuya Osako

5 goals

- (Kyrgyzstan national football team) Mirlan Murzaev

4 goals

- (Tajikistan national football team) Manuchekhr Dzhalilov

3 goals

- (Japan national football team) Takuma Asano
- (Japan national football team) Kyogo Furuhashi
- (Japan national football team) Daichi Kamada
- (Japan national football team) Ado Onaiwu
- (Kyrgyzstan national football team) Gulzhigit Alykulov
- (Kyrgyzstan national football team) Edgar Bernhardt
- (Kyrgyzstan national football team) Alimardon Shukurov

2 goals

- (Japan national football team) Sho Inagaki
- (Japan national football team) Junya Itō
- (Japan national football team) Hidemasa Morita
- (Myanmar national football team) Hlaing Bo Bo
- (Myanmar national football team) Suan Lam Mang
- (Tajikistan national football team) Alisher Dzhalilov
- (Tajikistan national football team) Shahrom Samiev

1 goal

- (Japan national football team) Wataru Endo
- (Japan national football team) Genki Haraguchi
- (Japan national football team) Kento Hashimoto
- (Japan national football team) Ko Itakura
- (Japan national football team) Hayao Kawabe
- (Japan national football team) Kensuke Nagai
- (Japan national football team) Yuto Nagatomo
- (Japan national football team) Shoya Nakajima
- (Japan national football team) Sho Sasaki
- (Japan national football team) Maya Yoshida
- (Kyrgyzstan national football team) Abay Bokoleyev
- (Kyrgyzstan national football team) Valery Kichin
- (Kyrgyzstan national football team) Tamirlan Kozubaev
- (Kyrgyzstan national football team) Farhat Musabekov
- (Kyrgyzstan national football team) Tursunali Rustamov
- (Mongolia national football team) Dölgöön Amaraa
- (Mongolia national football team) Oyunbaataryn Mijiddorj
- (Mongolia national football team) Norjmoogiin Tsedenbal
- (Myanmar national football team) Aung Thu
- (Myanmar national football team) Maung Maung Lwin
- (Tajikistan national football team) Sheriddin Boboev
- (Tajikistan national football team) Davronjon Ergashev
- (Tajikistan national football team) Jahongir Ergashev
- (Tajikistan national football team) Ehson Panjshanbe
- (Tajikistan national football team) Komron Tursunov
- (Tajikistan national football team) Farkhod Vosiyev

1 own goal

- (Mongolia national football team) Khash-Erdene Tuya (against Japan)

== Group G ==
Pos	Team	Pld	W	D	L	GF	GA	GD	Pts	Qualification	United Arab Emirates	Vietnam	Malaysia	Thailand	Indonesia
1	United Arab Emirates	8	6	0	2	23	7	+16	18	World Cup qualifying third round and Asian Cup	—	3–2	4–0	3–1	5–0
2	Vietnam	8	5	2	1	13	5	+8	17	World Cup qualifying third round and Asian Cup	1–0	—	1–0	0–0	4–0
3	Malaysia	8	4	0	4	10	12	−2	12	Asian Cup qualifying third round	1–2	1–2	—	2–1	2–0
4	Thailand	8	2	3	3	9	9	0	9	Asian Cup qualifying third round	2–1	0–0	0–1	—	2–2
5	Indonesia	8	0	1	7	5	27	−22	1	Asian Cup qualifying play-off round	0–5	1–3	2–3	0–3	—

Source: FIFA
Rules for classification: Qualification tiebreakers
5 September 2019
19:00 UTC+7

Thailand	0–0	Vietnam
	Report (FIFA); Report (AFC)

Thammasat Stadium, Pathum Thani
Attendance: 19,011
Referee: Saoud Al-Adba (Qatar)
5 September 2019
19:30 UTC+7

Indonesia	2–3	Malaysia
Beto 11', 38'	Report (FIFA); Report (AFC)	Sumareh 36', 90+6'; Syafiq 65'

Gelora Bung Karno Stadium, Jakarta
Attendance: 54,659
Referee: Ko Hyung-jin (South Korea)

10 September 2019
19:30 UTC+7

Indonesia	0–3	Thailand
	Report (FIFA); Report (AFC)	Supachok 55', 71'; Theerathon 65' (pen.)

Gelora Bung Karno Stadium, Jakarta
Attendance: 11,619
Referee: Ma Ning (China)
10 September 2019
20:45 UTC+8

Malaysia	1–2	United Arab Emirates
Syafiq 1'	Report (FIFA); Report (AFC)	Mabkhout 43', 75'

Bukit Jalil National Stadium, Kuala Lumpur
Attendance: 43,200
Referee: Hiroyuki Kimura (Japan)

10 October 2019
20:00 UTC+7

Vietnam	1–0	Malaysia
Nguyễn Quang Hải 40'	Report (FIFA); Report (AFC)

Mỹ Đình National Stadium, Hanoi
Attendance: 38,256
Referee: Mooud Bonyadifar (Iran)
10 October 2019
20:00 UTC+4

United Arab Emirates	5–0	Indonesia
Ibrahim 40'; Mabkhout 51', 63' (pen.), 72'; Ahmed 90+3'	Report (FIFA); Report (AFC)

Al Maktoum Stadium, Dubai
Attendance: 6,678 (Note: The United Arab Emirates v Indonesia match was initially announced to be played without spectators following sanctions due to the 2019 AFC Asian Cup incident between the United Arab Emirates and Qatar. The decision was later appealed by the UAEFA, and was successful.)
Referee: Adham Makhadmeh (Jordan)

15 October 2019
19:30 UTC+8

Indonesia	1–3	Vietnam
Bachdim 84'	Report (FIFA); Report (AFC)	Đỗ Duy Mạnh 26'; Quế Ngọc Hải 55' (pen.); Nguyễn Tiến Linh 61'

Kapten I Wayan Dipta Stadium, Gianyar (Note: The Indonesia v Vietnam match was shifted to Kapten I Wayan Dipta Stadium, Gianyar from Gelora Bung Karno Stadium, Jakarta based on an internal risk management process and analysis by the PSSI General Secretariat.)
Attendance: 8,237
Referee: Turki Al-Khudhayr (Saudi Arabia)
15 October 2019
19:00 UTC+7

Thailand	2–1	United Arab Emirates
Teerasil 26'; Ekanit 51'	Report (FIFA); Report (AFC)	Mabkhout 45+2'

Thammasat Stadium, Pathum Thani
Attendance: 16,057
Referee: Hettikamkanamge Perera (Sri Lanka)

14 November 2019
20:45 UTC+8

Malaysia	2–1	Thailand
Gan 26'; Sumareh 57'	Report (FIFA); Report (AFC)	Chanathip 7'

Bukit Jalil National Stadium, Kuala Lumpur
Attendance: 39,363
Referee: Ali Sabah (Iraq)
14 November 2019
20:00 UTC+7

Vietnam	1–0	United Arab Emirates
Nguyễn Tiến Linh 44'	Report (FIFA); Report (AFC)

Mỹ Đình National Stadium, Hanoi
Attendance: 37,879
Referee: Jumpei Iida (Japan)

19 November 2019
20:45 UTC+8

Malaysia	2–0	Indonesia
Safawi 30', 73'	Report (FIFA); Report (AFC)

Bukit Jalil National Stadium, Kuala Lumpur
Attendance: 75,044
Referee: Alireza Faghani (Iran)
19 November 2019
20:00 UTC+7

Vietnam	0–0	Thailand
	Report (FIFA); Report (AFC)

Mỹ Đình National Stadium, Hanoi
Attendance: 40,000
Referee: Ahmed Al-Kaf (Oman)

3 June 2021
20:45 UTC+4

Thailand	2–2	Indonesia
Narubadin 5'; Adisak 50'	Report (FIFA); Report (AFC)	Kadek 39'; Evan 60'

Al Maktoum Stadium, Dubai (United Arab Emirates)
Attendance: 0
Referee: Ammar Mahfoodh (Bahrain)
3 June 2021
20:45 UTC+4

United Arab Emirates	4–0	Malaysia
Mabkhout 18', 90+1'; Lima 83', 90+2'	Report (FIFA); Report (AFC)

Zabeel Stadium, Dubai
Attendance: 1,127
Referee: Kim Dae-yong (South Korea)

7 June 2021
20:45 UTC+4

United Arab Emirates	3–1	Thailand
Caio 14'; Lima 33'; Jumaa 90+4'	Report (FIFA); Report (AFC)	Suphanat 54'

Zabeel Stadium, Dubai
Attendance: 980
Referee: Ryuji Sato (Japan)
7 June 2021
20:45 UTC+4

Vietnam	4–0	Indonesia
Nguyễn Tiến Linh 51'; Nguyễn Quang Hải 62'; Nguyễn Công Phượng 67'; Vũ Văn Thanh 74'	Report (FIFA); Report (AFC)

Al Maktoum Stadium, Dubai (United Arab Emirates)
Attendance: 225
Referee: Ahmed Al-Ali (Kuwait)

11 June 2021
20:45 UTC+4

Indonesia	0–5	United Arab Emirates
	Report (FIFA); Report (AFC)	Mabkhout 22', 49' (pen.); Lima 28', 55'; Tagliabúe 86'

Zabeel Stadium, Dubai (United Arab Emirates)
Attendance: 963
Referee: Mohammed Al-Hoish (Saudi Arabia)
11 June 2021
20:45 UTC+4

Malaysia	1–2	Vietnam
Guilherme 72' (pen.)	Report (FIFA); Report (AFC)	Nguyễn Tiến Linh 27'; Quế Ngọc Hải 82' (pen.)

Al Maktoum Stadium, Dubai (United Arab Emirates)
Attendance: 335
Referee: Ryuji Sato (Japan)

15 June 2021
20:45 UTC+4

United Arab Emirates	3–2	Vietnam
Salmeen 32'; Mabkhout 40' (pen.); Khamees 50'	Report (FIFA); Report (AFC)	Nguyễn Tiến Linh 85'; Trần Minh Vương 90+3'

Zabeel Stadium, Dubai
Attendance: 1,355
Referee: Ali Sabah (Iraq)
15 June 2021
20:45 UTC+4

Thailand	0–1	Malaysia
	Report (FIFA); Report (AFC)	Safawi 52' (pen.)

Al Maktoum Stadium, Dubai (United Arab Emirates)
Attendance: 142
Referee: Mohammed Al-Hoish (Saudi Arabia)

Goalscorers

There were 60 goals scored in 20 matches, for an average of 3 goals per match.

11 goals

- (United Arab Emirates national football team) Ali Mabkhout

5 goals

- (United Arab Emirates national football team) Fábio Lima
- (Vietnam national football team) Nguyễn Tiến Linh

3 goals

- (Malaysia national football team) Safawi Rasid
- (Malaysia national football team) Mohamadou Sumareh

2 goals

- (Indonesia national football team) Beto Gonçalves
- (Malaysia national football team) Syafiq Ahmad
- (Thailand national football team) Supachok Sarachat
- (Vietnam national football team) Nguyễn Quang Hải
- (Vietnam national football team) Quế Ngọc Hải

1 goal

- (Indonesia national football team) Kadek Agung
- (Indonesia national football team) Evan Dimas
- (Indonesia national football team) Irfan Bachdim
- (Malaysia national football team) Brendan Gan
- (Malaysia national football team) Guilherme
- (Thailand national football team) Theerathon Bunmathan
- (Thailand national football team) Teerasil Dangda
- (Thailand national football team) Adisak Kraisorn
- (Thailand national football team) Suphanat Mueanta
- (Thailand national football team) Ekanit Panya
- (Thailand national football team) Chanathip Songkrasin
- (Thailand national football team) Narubadin Weerawatnodom
- (United Arab Emirates national football team) Tareq Ahmed
- (United Arab Emirates national football team) Caio Canedo
- (United Arab Emirates national football team) Khalil Ibrahim
- (United Arab Emirates national football team) Mohammed Jumaa
- (United Arab Emirates national football team) Mahmoud Khamees
- (United Arab Emirates national football team) Ali Salmeen
- (United Arab Emirates national football team) Sebastián Tagliabúe
- (Vietnam national football team) Đỗ Duy Mạnh
- (Vietnam national football team) Nguyễn Công Phượng
- (Vietnam national football team) Trần Minh Vương
- (Vietnam national football team) Vũ Văn Thanh

== Group H ==
Pos	Team	Pld	W	D	L	GF	GA	GD	Pts	Qualification	South Korea	Lebanon	Turkmenistan	Sri Lanka	North Korea
1	South Korea	6	5	1	0	22	1	+21	16	World Cup qualifying third round and Asian Cup	—	2–1	5–0	8–0	~~Canc.~~
2	Lebanon	6	3	1	2	11	8	+3	10	World Cup qualifying third round and Asian Cup	0–0	—	2–1	3–2	~~0–0~~
3	Turkmenistan	6	3	0	3	8	11	−3	9	Asian Cup qualifying third round	0–2	3–2	—	2–0	~~3–1~~
4	Sri Lanka	6	0	0	6	2	23	−21	0	Asian Cup qualifying third round	0–5	0–3	0–2	—	~~0–1~~
5	North Korea (Note: North Korea withdrew due to safety concerns related to the COVID-19 pandemic: their results were expunged.)	0	0	0	0	0	0	0	0	Withdrew, results expunged	~~0–0~~	~~2–0~~	~~Canc.~~	~~Canc.~~	—

Source: FIFA
Rules for classification: Qualification tiebreakers
Notes:
5 September 2019
17:30 UTC+9

North Korea	Expunged (2–0)	Lebanon
Jong Il-gwan 7', 56'	Report (FIFA); Report (AFC)

Kim Il-sung Stadium, Pyongyang
Attendance: 40,000
Referee: Sherzod Kasimov (Uzbekistan)
5 September 2019
19:30 UTC+5:30

Sri Lanka	0–2	Turkmenistan
	Report (FIFA); Report (AFC)	Orazsähedow 8'; Amanow 53'

Colombo Racecourse, Colombo
Attendance: 1,120
Referee: Mohammed Al-Hoish (Saudi Arabia)

10 September 2019
19:00 UTC+5

Turkmenistan	0–2	South Korea
	Report (FIFA); Report (AFC)	Na Sang-ho 13'; Jung Woo-young 82'

Köpetdag Stadium, Ashgabat
Attendance: 26,000
Referee: Ammar Al-Jeneibi (United Arab Emirates)
10 September 2019
19:30 UTC+5:30

Sri Lanka	Expunged (0–1)	North Korea
	Report (FIFA); Report (AFC)	Jang Kuk-chol 67'

Colombo Racecourse, Colombo
Attendance: 1,258
Referee: Timur Faizullin (Kyrgyzstan)

10 October 2019
20:00 UTC+9

South Korea	8–0	Sri Lanka
Son Heung-min 10', 45+5' (pen.); Kim Shin-wook 17', 30', 54', 64'; Hwang Hee-chan 20'; Kwon Chang-hoon 76'	Report (FIFA); Report (AFC)

Hwaseong Stadium, Hwaseong
Attendance: 23,522
Referee: Hasan Akrami (Iran)
10 October 2019
19:00 UTC+3

Lebanon	2–1	Turkmenistan
El-Helwe 5'; Matar 64'	Report (FIFA); Report (AFC)	Annadurdyýew 62'

Camille Chamoun Sports City Stadium, Beirut
Attendance: 7,820
Referee: Takuto Okabe (Japan)

15 October 2019
17:30 UTC+9

North Korea	Expunged (0–0)	South Korea
	Report (FIFA); Report (AFC)

Kim Il-sung Stadium, Pyongyang
Attendance: 100
Referee: Abdulrahman Al-Jassim (Qatar)
15 October 2019
19:30 UTC+5:30

Sri Lanka	0–3	Lebanon
	Report (FIFA); Report (AFC)	Maatouk 15' (pen.); El-Helwe 38' (pen.), 81'

Colombo Racecourse, Colombo
Attendance: 1,052
Referee: Ammar Mahfoodh (Bahrain)

14 November 2019
16:00 UTC+5

Turkmenistan	Expunged (3–1)	North Korea
Titow 23'; Amanow 73'; Orazsähedow 88'	Report (FIFA); Report (AFC)	Han Kwang-song 90+3'

Köpetdag Stadium, Ashgabat
Attendance: 26,500
Referee: Sivakorn Pu-udom (Thailand)
14 November 2019
15:00 UTC+2

Lebanon	0–0	South Korea
	Report (FIFA); Report (AFC)

Camille Chamoun Sports City Stadium, Beirut
Attendance: 170 (Note: The Lebanon matches versus South Korea and North Korea were played behind closed doors due to security concerns arising from the Lebanese protests.)
Referee: Mohanad Qasim (Iraq)

19 November 2019
16:00 UTC+5

Turkmenistan	2–0	Sri Lanka
Bäşimow 44'; Annadurdyýew 59'	Report (FIFA); Report (AFC)

Köpetdag Stadium, Ashgabat
Attendance: 26,304
Referee: Saoud Al-Adba (Qatar)
19 November 2019
19:00 UTC+2

Lebanon	Expunged (0–0)	North Korea
	Report (FIFA); Report (AFC)

Camille Chamoun Sports City Stadium, Beirut
Attendance: 0
Referee: Yaqoob Abdul Baki (Oman)

3 June 2021
15:00 UTC+9

North Korea	Cancelled	Sri Lanka
	Report (AFC)

Goyang Stadium, Goyang (South Korea)

5 June 2021
15:00 UTC+9

Lebanon	3–2	Sri Lanka
Oumari 11', 44'; Kdouh 17'	Report (FIFA); Report (AFC)	Razeek 10', 61' (pen.)

Goyang Stadium, Goyang (South Korea)
Attendance: 73
Referee: Ahmad Yacoub Ibrahim (Jordan)
5 June 2021
20:00 UTC+9

South Korea	5–0	Turkmenistan
Hwang Ui-jo 9', 72'; Nam Tae-hee 45+2'; Kim Young-gwon 56'; Kwon Chang-hoon 62'	Report (FIFA); Report (AFC)

Goyang Stadium, Goyang
Attendance: 3,932
Referee: Turki Al-Khudhayr (Saudi Arabia)

7 June 2021
20:00 UTC+9

South Korea	Cancelled	North Korea
	Report (AFC)

Goyang Stadium, Goyang

9 June 2021
15:00 UTC+9

Turkmenistan	3–2	Lebanon
Babajanow 59'; Annagulyýew 85'; Annadurdyýew 90+1'	Report (FIFA); Report (AFC)	Ataya 73'; Saad 75'

Goyang Stadium, Goyang (South Korea)
Attendance: 52
Referee: Hanna Hattab (Syria)
9 June 2021
20:00 UTC+9

Sri Lanka	0–5	South Korea
	Report (FIFA); Report (AFC)	Kim Shin-wook 14', 42' (pen.); Lee Dong-gyeong 22'; Hwang Hee-chan 53'; Jeong Sang-bin 77'

Goyang Stadium, Goyang (South Korea)
Attendance: 4,008
Referee: Shen Yinhao (China)

13 June 2021
15:00 UTC+9

South Korea	2–1	Lebanon
Sabra 50' (o.g.); Son Heung-min 65' (pen.)	Report (FIFA); Report (AFC)	Saad 12'

Goyang Stadium, Goyang
Attendance: 4,061
Referee: Khamis Al-Marri (Qatar)

15 June 2021
15:00 UTC+9

North Korea	Cancelled	Turkmenistan
	Report (AFC)

Goyang Stadium, Goyang (South Korea)

Goalscorers

There were 50 goals scored in 17 matches, for an average of 2.94 goals per match.

6 goals

- (South Korea national football team) Kim Shin-wook

3 goals

- (Lebanon national football team) Hilal El-Helwe
- (South Korea national football team) Son Heung-min
- (Turkmenistan national football team) Altymyrat Annadurdyýew

2 goals

- (Lebanon national football team) Joan Oumari
- (Lebanon national football team) Soony Saad
- (North Korea national football team) Jong Il-gwan
- (South Korea national football team) Hwang Hee-chan
- (South Korea national football team) Hwang Ui-jo
- (South Korea national football team) Kwon Chang-hoon
- (Sri Lanka national football team) Ahmed Waseem Razeek
- (Turkmenistan national football team) Arslanmyrat Amanow
- (Turkmenistan national football team) Wahyt Orazsähedow

1 goal

- (Lebanon national football team) Rabih Ataya
- (Lebanon national football team) Mohamad Kdouh
- (Lebanon national football team) Hassan Maatouk
- (Lebanon national football team) Nader Matar
- (North Korea national football team) Han Kwang-song
- (North Korea national football team) Jang Kuk-chol
- (South Korea national football team) Jeong Sang-bin
- (South Korea national football team) Jung Woo-young
- (South Korea national football team) Kim Young-gwon
- (South Korea national football team) Lee Dong-gyeong
- (South Korea national football team) Na Sang-ho
- (South Korea national football team) Nam Tae-hee
- (South Korea national football team) Song Min-kyu
- (Turkmenistan national football team) Güýçmyrat Annagulyýew
- (Turkmenistan national football team) Zafar Babajanow
- (Turkmenistan national football team) Abdy Bäşimow
- (Turkmenistan national football team) Mihail Titow

== Ranking of runner-up teams ==
Group H contained only four teams, as opposed to five teams in all other groups, after North Korea's withdrawal. Therefore, the results against the fifth-placed team were not counted when determining the ranking of the runner-up teams.

Pos	Grp	Team	Pld	W	D	L	GF	GA	GD	Pts	Qualification
1	A	China (Note: China already qualified for the Asian Cup as host nation. They withdrew their hosting right in May 2022.)	6	4	1	1	16	3	+13	13	World Cup qualifying third round and Asian Cup
2	E	Oman	6	4	0	2	9	5	+4	12	World Cup qualifying third round and Asian Cup
3	C	Iraq	6	3	2	1	6	3	+3	11	World Cup qualifying third round and Asian Cup
4	G	Vietnam	6	3	2	1	6	4	+2	11	World Cup qualifying third round and Asian Cup
5	H	Lebanon	6	3	1	2	11	8	+3	10	World Cup qualifying third round and Asian Cup
6	F	Tajikistan	6	3	1	2	7	8	−1	10	Asian Cup qualifying third round
7	D	Uzbekistan	6	3	0	3	12	9	+3	9	Asian Cup qualifying third round
8	B	Kuwait	6	2	2	2	8	6	+2	8	Asian Cup qualifying third round

Source: FIFA
Rules for classification: Tiebreakers

== Ranking of fifth-placed teams ==
Pos	Grp	Team	Pld	W	D	L	GF	GA	GD	Pts	Qualification
1	F	Myanmar	8	2	0	6	6	35	−29	6	Asian Cup qualifying third round
2	D	Yemen	8	1	2	5	6	18	−12	5	Asian Cup qualifying third round
3	E	Bangladesh	8	0	2	6	3	19	−16	2	Asian Cup qualifying third round
4	G	Indonesia	8	0	1	7	5	27	−22	1	Asian Cup qualifying play-off round
5	C	Cambodia	8	0	1	7	2	44	−42	1	Asian Cup qualifying play-off round
6	B	Chinese Taipei	8	0	0	8	4	34	−30	0	Asian Cup qualifying play-off round
7	A	Guam	8	0	0	8	2	32	−30	0	Asian Cup qualifying play-off round

Source: FIFA
Rules for classification: Tiebreakers
