= Mahbubur Rahman Sufil =

Bangladeshi footballer

Mahbubur Rahman
Personal information
- Full name: Mahbubur Rahman Sufil
- Date of birth: 10 September 1999 (age 27)
- Place of birth: Moulvibazar, Bangladesh
- Height: 1.65 m (5 ft 5 in)
- Position: Forward

Youth career
- 2014: Mohammedan SC U18

Senior career*
Years	Team	Apps	(Gls)
2015–16	Dilkusha SC		
2016–18	Arambagh KS		(2)
2018–22	Bashundhara Kings	52	(1)
2022–23	Mohammedan SC	5	(0)
2023–25	Brothers Union	26	(4)

International career^{‡}
2017	Bangladesh U20	8	(4)
2018–22	Bangladesh U23	13	(2)
2018–22	Bangladesh	29	(5)
Medal record
Representing Bangladesh
SAFF U-18 Championship
Runner-up	2017 Bhutan	Team
South Asian Games
Bronze medal – third place	2019 Nepal	Team
- * Club domestic league appearances and goals as of 23 May 2025 ‡ National team caps and goals as of 14 June 2022

Mahbubur Rahman Sufil (Bengali: মাহবুবুর রহমান সুফিল) is a Bangladeshi professional footballer who plays as a forward. He is currently a Free agent having last played for Bangladesh Premier League club Brothers Union and the Bangladesh national team.

He began his professional league career with Arambagh KS in the Bangladesh Premier League. He was the captain of the club for 2017–2018 season.

== Club career ==
=== Arambagh KS ===
Sufil joined Arambagh KS for the 2016 Bangladesh Premier League. He was the captain of the club during the 2017–18 season. He led the club to its first-ever local title in its almost 60-year history, beating defending champions Chittagong Abahani in the final of the 2017–18 Independence Cup by a 2–0 margin on 10 February 2018 at the Bangabandhu National Stadium in Dhaka.

=== Bashundhara Kings ===
Sufil joined the Bashundhara Kings from Arambagh KS on 1 July 2018. On 5 February 2021, Sufil scored his first goal for the club during a 2–1 victory over Chittagong Abahani Limited.

== International career ==
=== Youth ===
Sufil appeared for the national under-20 side in both the 2017 SAFF U-18 Championship and 2018 AFC U-19 Championship qualification. He scored three goals in AFC qualification, including a brace in a 4–0 victory over Sri Lanka and the game-winner in stoppage time against the Maldives. During the 2017 SAFF U-18 Championship, Sufil scored one goal, the game-tying tally in a 4–3 shock victory over tournament favorites India in the tournament's opening match.

=== Senior team ===
Sufil made his senior international debut on 27 March 2018 in an International friendly against Laos. He entered the match as a second-half substitute before scoring the game-tying goal in the third minute of stoppage time. In warm-up matches for the friendly against Laos, Sufil scored a goal against Bangkok Glass FC of Thai League 1 during a training camp in Thailand.

== International goals ==
=== Youth ===
#	Date	Venue	Opponent	Score	Result	Competition
1	18 September 2017	Changlimithang Stadium, Thimphu	India U18	3–3	4-3	2017 SAFF U-18 Championship
2	2 November 2017	Pamir Stadium, Dushanbe	(Maldives) Madlives U19	1–0	1-0	2018 AFC U-19 Championship qualification
3	8 November 2017	Hisor Central Stadium, Hisor	Sri Lanka U19	3–0	4–0	2018 AFC U-19 Championship qualification
4	8 November 2017	Hisor Central Stadium, Hisor	Sri Lanka U19	4–0	4–0	2018 AFC U-19 Championship qualification
5	3 August 2018	Mokpo International Football Center, Mokpo	(South Korea) Sehan University FC	2–1	2–1	Unofficial Friendly
6	16 August 2018	Pakansari Stadium, Cibinong	Thailand U 23	1–0	1–1	2018 Asian Games
7	5 December 2019	Dasarath Rangasala Stadium, Kathmandu	Sri Lanka U 23	1–0	1–0	2019 South Asian Games
Last updated 5 December 2019

=== Senior ===
Score and result list Bangladesh's goal tally first.

#	Date	Venue	Opponent	Score	Result	Competition
–	23 March 2018	Leo Stadium, Bangkok, Thailand	(Thailand) BG Pathum United F.C.	1–0	4–3	Unofficial Friendly
1.	27 March 2018	New Laos National Stadium, Vientiane	Laos	2–2	2–2	Friendly
2.	4 September 2018	Bangabandhu National Stadium, Dhaka	Bhutan	2–0	2–0	2018 SAFF Championship
3.	13 November 2020	Bangabandhu National Stadium, Dhaka	Nepal	2–0	2–0	Friendly
4.	29 March 2021	Dasarath Rangasala Stadium, Kathmandu	Nepal	1–2	1–2	2021 Three Nations Cup (Nepal)
5.	7 September 2021	Dolen Omurzakov Stadium, Bishkek	Kyrgyzstan	1–3	1–4	2021 Three Nations Cup (Kyrgyzstan)
Last updated 7 September 2021

=== Club ===
Bashundhara Kings

#	Date	Venue	Opponent	Score	Result	Competition
1.	21 September 2018	Sheikh Kamal Stadium, Nilphamari	(Maldives) New Radiant SC	4–0	4–1	Preseason Friendly
