= Teýmur Çaryýew =

Turkmenistan footballer

Personal information
- Full name: Teýmur Alikowiç Çaryýew
- Date of birth: 26 November 2000 (age 25)
- Place of birth: Mary, Turkmenistan
- Height: 1.77 m (5 ft 10 in)
- Position: Midfielder

Team information
- Current team: Bars Issyk-Kul
- Number: 14

Senior career*
Years	Team	Apps	(Gls)
2019–2023	Energetik Mary		
2023–2024	Abdysh-Ata Kant	42	(4)
2025	Torpedo-BelAZ Zhodino	27	(1)
2026–	Bars Issyk-Kul	19	(0)

International career^{‡}
2022–2023	Turkmenistan U23	6	(1)
2023–	Turkmenistan	15	(2)
- * Club domestic league appearances and goals as of 12:48, 9 October 2026 (UTC) ‡ National team caps and goals as of 12:48, 9 October 2026 (UTC)

Teýmur Çaryýew (born 26 November 2000) is a Turkmenistani footballer who plays for Bars Issyk-Kul of the Kyrgyz Premier League, and the Turkmenistan national team.

== Club career ==
Çaryýew began his career with FC Energetik Mary of the Ýokary Liga.

=== Abdysh-Ata Kant ===
In February 2023, he went on trial with FC Abdysh-Ata Kant of the Kyrgyz Premier League and appeared in an exhibition match against FC Kara-Balta. That season, Abdysh-Ata Kant went on to win the league for the second-time in club history with Çaryýew featuring prominently. That year, the player also scored a goal in the final of the 2023 Kyrgyzstan Cup. However, Abdysh-Ata Kant ultimately finished runner-up with a 1–2 defeat to FC Muras United. In total, Çaryýew won two championship titles with the FC Abdysh-Ata Kant, playing 65 matches and tallying 7 goals and 8 assists.

=== Torpedo-BelAZ Zhodino ===
Belarusian Premier League club FC Torpedo-BelAZ Zhodino announced the signing of Çaryýew on a one-year contract on 12 February 2025.

=== Bars Issyk-Kul ===
In January 2026, it was announced that Çaryýew had joined reigning Kyrgyz Higher League champion FC Bars Issyk-Kul for the 2026 season.

== International career ==
Çaryýew represented Turkmenistan at the youth level in 2022 AFC U-23 Asian Cup qualification and the 2022 AFC U-23 Asian Cup. He scored against Iran in the Group Stage of the final tournament.

He made his senior international debut on 11 June 2023, in a 2023 CAFA Nations Cup match against Tajikistan, at the age of 22.

=== International goals ===
Scores and results list Turkmenistan's goal tally first.

No.	Date	Venue	Opponent	Score	Result	Competition
1.	12 September 2023	Police Officers' Club Stadium, Dubai, United Arab Emirates	Bahrain	1–1	1–1	Friendly
2.	31 March 2026	Rajamangala Stadium, Bangkok, Thailand	Thailand	1–1	1–2	2027 AFC Asian Cup qualification
Last updated 12 June 2024

=== International ===
As of match played 26 March 2026

National team	Year	Apps	Goals
Turkmenistan	2023	7	1
Turkmenistan	2024	3	0
Turkmenistan	2025	4	0
Turkmenistan	2026	1	1
Total		15	2

== Honours ==
Abdysh-Ata

- Kyrgyz Premier League Champion: 2023, 2024
- Kyrgyzstan Super Cup: 2024

Bars

- Kyrgyzstan Super Cup: 2026
