= Beka Kavtaradze (footballer) =

Georgian football player (born 1999)

Personal information
- Date of birth: 15 June 1999 (age 27)
- Place of birth: Dusheti, Georgia
- Height: 1.85 m (6 ft 1 in)
- Position: Forward

Team information
- Current team: Bars
- Number: 80

Senior career*
Years	Team	Apps	(Gls)
2014–2015	35-e Skola	34	(32)
2017	Dinamo Tbilisi	11	(1)
2018–2019	Rustavi	49	(12)
2020	Saburtalo Tbilisi	18	(7)
2021	Nizhny Novgorod	10	(3)
2021–2022	Rotor Volgograd	19	(3)
2022	Telavi	13	(2)
2023	Yelimay Semey	21	(19)
2024–2025	Melilla	31	(2)
2025–	Bars	7	(1)

International career^{‡}
2015–2016	Georgia U17	8	(3)
2016–2017	Georgia U19	6	(0)
2018–2020	Georgia U21	10	(1)
- * Club domestic league appearances and goals as of 28 September 2025 ‡ National team caps and goals as of 8 September 2020

Beka Kavtaradze (Georgian: ბექა ქავთარაძე; born 15 June 1999) is a Georgian football player who plays for Kyrgyz club Bars.

== Club career ==
He made his debut in the Russian Football National League for Nizhny Novgorod on 24 March 2021 in a game against Akron Tolyatti. He started the next game against Krasnodar-2 on 28 March 2021 and scored his first two FNL goals in a 3–0 victory.

On 10 June 2021, he signed with Rotor Volgograd.
