= Mirlan Murzayev =

Kyrgyz footballer (born 1990)

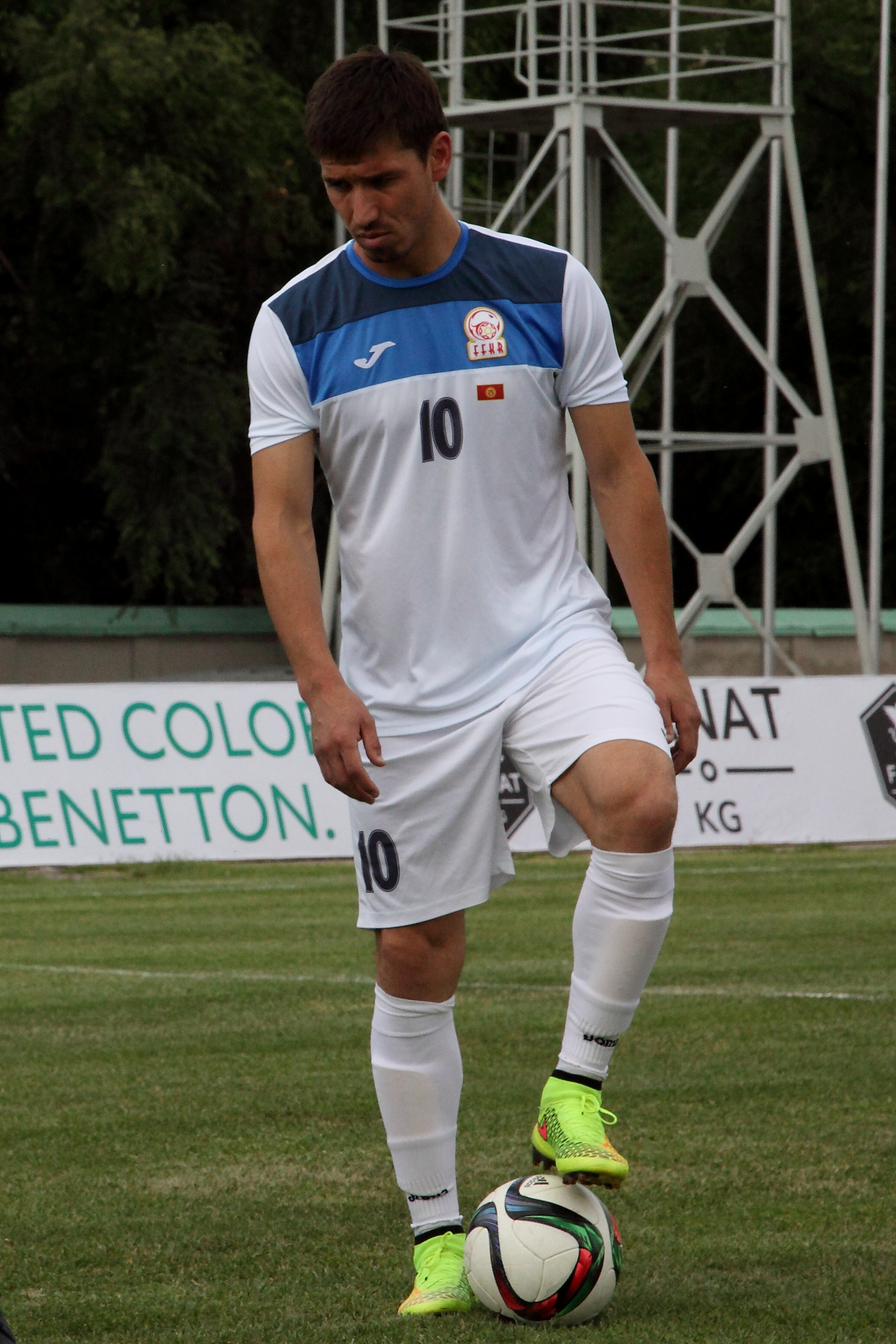
- Murzayev with Kyrgyzstan in 2015

Personal information
- Full name: Mirlan Abdraimovich Murzayev
- Date of birth: 29 March 1990 (age 36)
- Place of birth: Kochkor-Ata, Kirghiz SSR, USSR
- Height: 1.83 m (6 ft 0 in)
- Positions: Forward; winger

Team information
- Current team: Bars
- Number: 10

Youth career
- Bishkek-90
- Muras-Sport Bishkek

Senior career*
Years	Team	Apps	(Gls)
2005–2006	Molodyozhnaya Sbornaya	33	(17)
2006	Muras-Sport Bishkek	10	(6)
2007–2010	Dordoi Bishkek	73	(58)
2010	→ Lokomotiv-2 Moscow (loan)	11	(9)
2011–2012	Hapoel Petah Tikva	8	(7)
2012–2013	Dordoi Bishkek	44	(31)
2014	Denizlispor	9	(6)
2014–2015	Dordoi Bishkek	16	(17)
2015–2016	Afjet Afyonspor	17	(8)
2016–2017	Utaş Uşakspor	22	(14)
2017–2018	Serik Belediyespor	18	(13)
2018–2019	Somaspor	11	(9)
2019	Dordoi Bishkek	5	(3)
2019	Doğan Türk Birliği	8	(3)
2020–2021	Dordoi Bishkek	30	(17)
2021–2022	Chennaiyin	19	(2)
2022	Alga Bishkek		
2022–2023	Navbahor Namangan		
2023	Mohammedan	11	(2)
2023	Hanoi FC	3	(0)
2024	Dordoi Bishkek		
2024	Alga Bishkek	9	(2)
2025	Bars	42	(21)

International career
2009–	Kyrgyzstan	60	(16)
- * Club domestic league appearances and goals

Mirlan Abdraimovich Murzayev (Kyrgyz: Мирлан Мурзаев; Russian: Мирлан Абдраимович Мурзаев; born 29 March 1990) is a Kyrgyz professional footballer who plays as a forward for Kyrgyz Premier League club FC Bars Issyk-Kul and the Kyrgyzstan national team.

== Club career ==
In January 2014, Murzayev moved to Denizlispor in the TFF First League on a six-month contract.

While playing for FC Dordoi Bishkek in May 2015, Murzayev became the 17th player to score 100 goals in Kyrgyzstan League and Cup matches.

In January 2016, Murzayev was linked with a move to Al-Ahli, a move that was blocked by his current club at the time, Afjet Afyonspor.

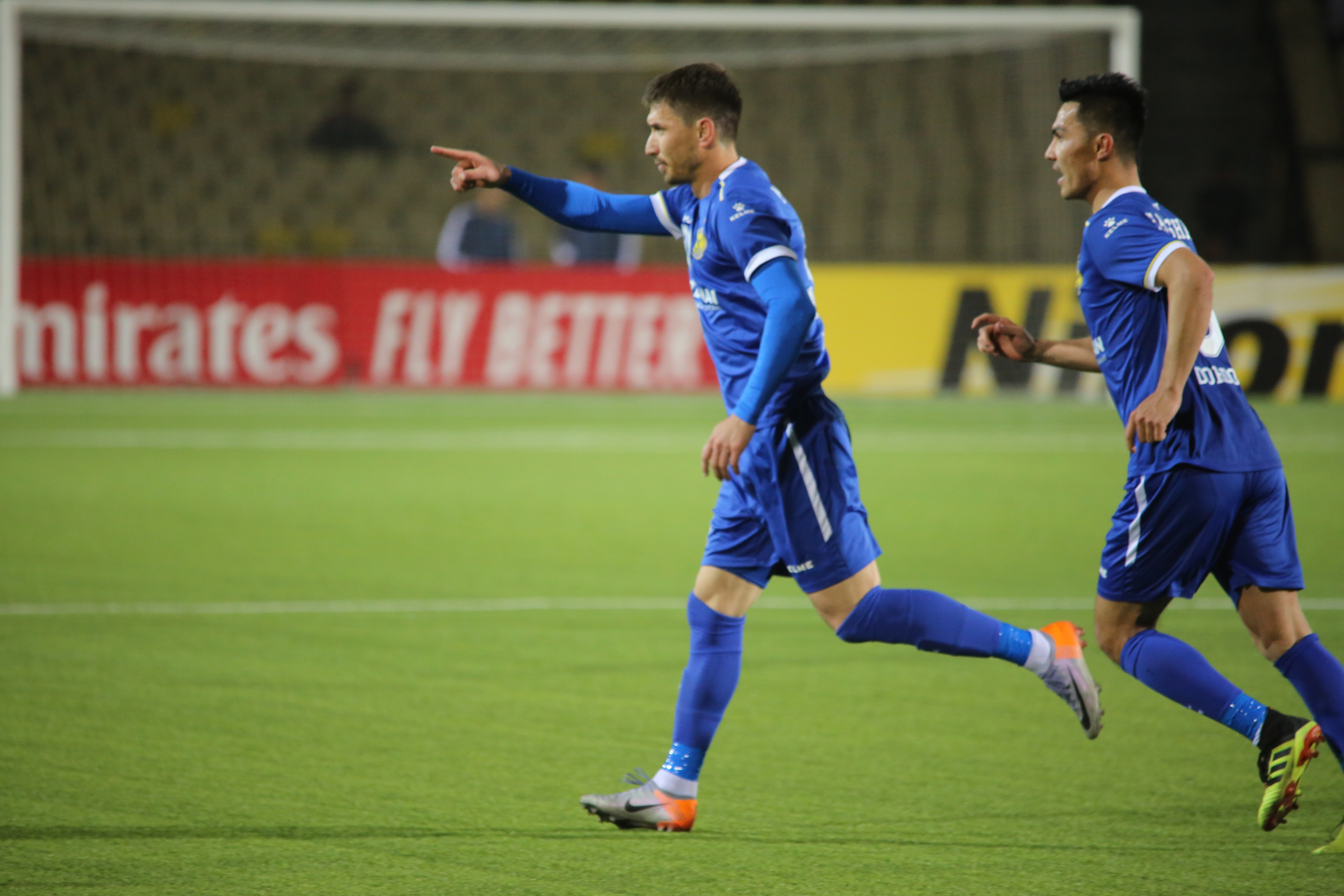
Murzayev with Dordoi Bishkek, after scoring against Istiklol, in 2019 AFC Cup.

On 9 March 2019, Dordoi Bishkek announced the return of Murzayev. On 29 July 2019, Dordoi Bishkek announced that Murzayev was leaving the club to move the KTFF 1. Lig. On 5 August, Murzayev was announced as a new signing for Doğan Türk Birliği.

On 1 August 2021, Mirlan Murzayev joined Indian Super League side Chennaiyin on a one–year deal. He made his debut on 23 November against Hyderabad in a 1–0 win. He scored his first goal on 18 December in their 2–1 win against Odisha.

On 17 July 2022, Mirlan would join Navbahor Namangan on a free from Alga. In December, he returned to India to play in the I-League, signing with Kolkata Mohammedan.

On 27 June 2023, it was announced that Murzayev had agreed to join Hanoi FC on a one-year contract, following the expiry of his Mohammedan contract. He joined on a free transfer and reunited with his former Chennaiyin manager Božidar Bandović. He made his V.League 1 debut in a 0–1 home loss against Song Lam Nghe An on 2 July. On 16 September, Murzayev's release from Hanoi was confirmed on the club's Facebook account.

On 29 December 2023, Dordoi Bishkek announced the return of Murzayev. On 25 March 2024, Dordoi Bishkek announced that Murzayev had left the club by mutual consent.

== International career ==
A full international for Kyrgyzstan since 2009, Murzayev represented the nation at the 2019 AFC Asian Cup. With 16 goals, he is the team's all-time top goalscorer.

== Career statistics ==
As of match played 11 September 2023

Appearances and goals by national team and year
National team	Year	Apps	Goals
Kyrgyzstan	2009	6	4
Kyrgyzstan	2010	0	0
Kyrgyzstan	2011	2	0
Kyrgyzstan	2012	0	0
Kyrgyzstan	2013	7	0
Kyrgyzstan	2014	3	0
Kyrgyzstan	2015	6	0
Kyrgyzstan	2016	4	1
Kyrgyzstan	2017	4	1
Kyrgyzstan	2018	6	2
Kyrgyzstan	2019	11	2
Kyrgyzstan	2020	0	0
Kyrgyzstan	2021	3	4
Kyrgyzstan	2022	4	1
Kyrgyzstan	2023	4	1
Total		60	16

Scores and results list Kyrgyzstan's goal tally first, score column indicates score after each Murzayev goal.

List of international goals scored by Mirlan Murzayev
No.	Date	Venue	Opponent	Score	Result	Competition
1	28 March 2009	Dasarath Rangasala Stadium, Kathmandu, Nepal	Nepal	1–1	1–1	2010 AFC Challenge Cup qualification
2	30 March 2009	Dasarath Rangasala Stadium, Kathmandu, Nepal	Palestine	1–0	1–1	2010 AFC Challenge Cup qualification
3	23 August 2009	Ambedkar Stadium, New Delhi, India	India	1–2	1–2	2009 Nehru Cup
4	28 August 2009	Ambedkar Stadium, New Delhi, India	Sri Lanka	3–1	4–1	2009 Nehru Cup
5	30 August 2016	Dolen Omurzakov Stadium, Bishkek, Kyrgyzstan	Kazakhstan	2–0	2–0	Friendly
6	14 November 2017	Estádio Campo Desportivo, Taipa, China	Macau	4–2	4–3	2019 AFC Asian Cup qualification
7	27 March 2018	Dolen Omurzakov Stadium, Bishkek, Kyrgyzstan	India	2–0	2–1	2019 AFC Asian Cup qualification
8	6 September 2018	Dolen Omurzakov Stadium, Bishkek, Kyrgyzstan	Palestine	1–0	1–1	Friendly
9	21 January 2019	Zayed Sports City Stadium, Abu Dhabi, United Arab Emirates	United Arab Emirates	1–1	2–3 (a.e.t.)	2019 AFC Asian Cup
10	15 October 2019	MFF Football Centre, Ulaanbaatar, Mongolia	Mongolia	1–0	2–1	2022 FIFA World Cup qualification
11	11 June 2021	Yanmar Stadium Nagai, Osaka, Japan	Myanmar	5–0	8–1	2022 FIFA World Cup qualification
12	11 June 2021	Yanmar Stadium Nagai, Osaka, Japan	Myanmar	6–0	8–1	2022 FIFA World Cup qualification
13	11 June 2021	Yanmar Stadium Nagai, Osaka, Japan	Myanmar	8–1	8–1	2022 FIFA World Cup qualification
14	15 June 2021	Panasonic Stadium Suita, Suita, Japan	Japan	1–3	1–5	2022 FIFA World Cup qualification
15	25 March 2022	Markaziy Stadium, Namangan, Uzbekistan	Uzbekistan	1–0	1–3	2022 Nowruz Cup
16	16 June 2023	Dolen Omurzakov Stadium, Bishkek, Kyrgyzstan	Iran	1–2	1–5	2023 CAFA Nations Cup

== Honours ==
Dordoi Bishkek

- Kyrgyzstan League: 2007, 2008, 2009
- AFC President's Cup: 2007

Individual

- AFC President's Cup topgoalscore: 2012, 2013
- AFC President's Cup Most Valuable Player: 2010
