= Azim Azarov =

Kyrgyzstani footballer

Personal information
- Full name: Azim Kanatovich Azarov
- Date of birth: 20 September 1996 (age 30)
- Place of birth: Bishkek, Kyrgyzstan
- Height: 1.83 m (6 ft 0 in)
- Position: Midfielder

Team information
- Current team: FC Abdysh-Ata Kant
- Number: 8

Youth career
- 2006–2007: Alga Bishkek
- 2007–2009: Seytek
- 2009–2013: Dordoi Bishkek

Senior career*
Years	Team	Apps	(Gls)
2013–2016	Ala-Too Naryn		
2016–2019	Dordoi Bishkek		
2019–2020	Ilbirs Bishkek		
2020–2021	Alga Bishkek	33	(2)
2022	FC Dordoi Bishkek	11	(1)
2023-	FC Abdysh-Ata Kant	18	(0)

International career^{‡}
2018	Kyrgyzstan U23	2	(0)
2021–	Kyrgyzstan	2	(1)
- * Club domestic league appearances and goals as of 29 January 2024 @ 15:04:39PM ‡ National team caps and goals as of 21:56, 7 September 2021 (UTC)

Azim Kanatovich Azarov (Kyrgyz: Азим Азаров; Russian: Азим Канатович Азаров; born 20 September 1996 in Bishkek) is a Kyrgyz professional footballer who plays as a midfielder for Alga Bishkek, and the Kyrgyzstan national team.

== Club career ==
Azarov has played domestically for Dordoi Bishkek, Ala-Too Naryn, Ilbirs Bishkek, and Alga Bishkek.

== International career ==
Azarov appeared for the Kyrgyzstan under-23 team in two of its matches during the 2018 Asian Games. In August 2021 he was named to the senior team's preliminary squad for matches the following month. He made his senior international debut on 2 September 2021 in a 2021 Three Nations Cup friendly against Palestine. He went on to score his first international goal in the match, Kyrgyzstan's eventual game-winner in the 1–0 victory.

== Career statistics ==
=== International goals ===
Scores and results list Kyrgyzstan's goal tally first.

No.	Date	Venue	Opponent	Score	Result	Competition
1.	2 September 2021	Dolen Omurzakov Stadium, Bishkek, Kyrgyzstan	Palestine	1–0	1–0	2021 Three Nations Cup
Last updated 6 September 2021

=== International career statistics ===
As of match played 7 September 2021.

Kyrgyzstan national team
Year	Apps	Goals
2021	2	1
Total	2	1
