= FC Bars Issyk-Kul =

Kyrgyz football club

- Full name: Football Club Bars; Барс футбол клубу
- Founded: 2024; 2 years ago
- Ground: Yntymak Arena, Karakol
- Capacity: 3,380
- Chairman: Kanimet Aralbaev
- Manager: Lasha Chagiashvili
- League: Kyrgyz Higher League
- 2025: 1st, Champions
- Website: Website
Home colours	Away colours	Third colours

FC Bars Issyk-Kul (Kyrgyz: Барс футбол клубу) is a Kyrgyz professional football club from Karakol, the capital of the Issyk-Kul District. The club currently competes in the Kyrgyz Higher League.

== History ==
The creation of FC Bars Issyk-Kul was announced in late 2024. As part of the announcement, former coach of the Kyrgyzstan national team Aleksandr Krestinin joined the club. FC Bars was immediately registered in the Kyrgyz Premier League as the top flight expanded from twelve to fourteen clubs for the 2025 season.

In May 2025, Krestinin resigned as the club manager and was replaced by Mirlan Eshenov. Eshenov was fired just a few weeks after taking the post, with Igor Surov finishing the season as the club's interim manager. Despite the coaching shake ups, Bars Issyk-Kul won the league championship during its inaugural season, edging out FC Muras United by one point in the final standings. Despite the championship, the club would not be Kyrgyzstan's representative in the 2026–27 AFC Challenge League because of an Asian Football Confederation competition regulation stating that a club must be licensed for at least two years to be eligible.

== Stadium ==
The club plays its home matches at the largest stadium in the region, the Yntymak Arena in Karakol.

== Current squad ==
As of 2 April, 2026

Note: Flags indicate national team as defined under FIFA eligibility rules; some limited exceptions apply. Players may hold more than one non-FIFA nationality.

No.	Pos.	Nation	Player
2	DF	KGZ	Valery Kichin
4	DF	GEO	Gia Chaduneli
5	MF	KGZ	Azim Obonov
6	MF	KGZ	Magamed Uzdenov
7	MF	KGZ	Argen Zhumataev
8	MF	KGZ	Sardorbek Nematov
9	DF	KGZ	Bekzhan Sagynbayev
10	FW	KGZ	Mirlan Murzayev
11	MF	KGZ	Farkhat Musabekov
13	DF	BLR	Aleksey Abramov
14	MF	TKM	Teýmur Çaryýew
15	FW	GHA	Emmanuel Yaghr
16	GK	KGZ	Bekzat Stamkulov

No.	Pos.	Nation	Player
17	MF	KGZ	Aydar Abdyzhalil uulu
18	MF	ESP	Albert Torras
20	MF	KGZ	Kayrat Zhyrgalbek uulu
21	DF	GAM	Muhammed Sanneh
22	FW	GEO	Temur Chogadze
34	DF	KGZ	Ayzar Akmatov
44	DF	KGZ	Said Datsiev
55	FW	KGZ	Kadyrbek Shaarbekov
71	GK	KGZ	Marsel Islamkulov
77	MF	KGZ	Bakhtiyar Duyshobekov
78	GK	KGZ	Ruslan Amirov
80	FW	GEO	Beka Kavtaradze

== Seasons ==
Key

Champions Runners-up 3rd place

Season	League									Kyrgyzstan Cup	Top goalscorer		Manager
Season	Div.	Pos.	Pl.	W	D	L	GS	GA	P	Kyrgyzstan Cup	Name	League	Manager
2025	1st	1st	26	19	4	3	51	21	61	Round of 16	Mirlan Murzayev	11	(Russia) Aleksandr Krestinin (Kyrgyzstan) Mirlan Eshenov (Russia) Igor Surov
2026	1st												(Spain) Francesc Bonet (Georgia (country)) Lasha Chagiashvili

== Honours ==
=== Domestic ===
- Kyrgyzstan League
  - Champions (1): 2025
