= Marsel Islamkulov =

Kazakhstani-Kyrgyzstani footballer

Personal information
- Full name: Marsel Dzhekshenovich Islamkulov
- Date of birth: 18 April 1994 (age 32)
- Place of birth: Kant, Kyrgyzstan
- Height: 1.87 m (6 ft 2 in)
- Position: Goalkeeper

Team information
- Current team: FC Bars Issyk-Kul
- Number: 71

Youth career
- Abdysh-Ata Kant
- Dynamo Kyiv

Senior career*
Years	Team	Apps	(Gls)
2011–2012	Abdysh-Ata Kant		
2013–2014	Astana-1964	34	(0)
2015	Baikonur	9	(0)
2016–2022	Kaisar	65	(0)
2022	Aksu	9	(0)
2023–2024	Abdysh-Ata Kant	19	(0)

International career^{‡}
2023–	Kyrgyzstan	2	(0)
- * Club domestic league appearances and goals ‡ National team caps and goals as of 25 January 2024

Marsel Dzhekshenovich Islamkulov (Kyrgyz: Марсель Исламкулов; Russian: Марсель Джекшенович Исламкулов; born 18 April 1994) is a Kyrgyzstani professional footballer who plays as a goalkeeper.

== Club career ==
As a youth player, Islamkulov joined the youth academy of Dynamo (Kyiv), Ukraine's most successful club, after playing for the youth academy of Abdysh-Ata in Kyrgyzstan.

Before the 2013 season, he signed for Kazakhstani second division side Astana-1964.

== International career ==
From 2017 to 2019, Islamkulov was periodically called up to the Kazakhstan national team, but remained on the bench in all those cases.

In 2023, he switched international allegiance to the Kyrgyzstan national team. He made his debut on 25 December 2023 in a friendly against Uzbekistan.

He was included in Kyrgyzstan's squad for the 2023 AFC Asian Cup.
