= Abay Bokoleyev =

Kyrgyzstani footballer

Personal information
- Full name: Abay Chingizovich Bokoleyev
- Date of birth: 3 February 1996 (age 30)
- Place of birth: Belovodskoye, Kyrgyzstan
- Height: 1.76 m (5 ft 9 1/2 in)
- Position: Forward

Team information
- Current team: Dordoi Bishkek
- Number: 96

Senior career*
Years	Team	Apps	(Gls)
2013–2015	Ala-Too Naryn		
2015–2017	Yeni Milasspor		
2017–2018	Yeni Çanspor		
2018	Alga Bishkek		
2018–	Dordoi Bishkek		
2019	→ Ilbirs Bishkek (loan)		

International career^{‡}
2019–	Kyrgyzstan	3	(1)
- * Club domestic league appearances and goals as of 22 May 2021 ‡ National team caps and goals as of 15 June 2021

Abay Chingizovich Bokoleyev (Kyrgyz: Абай Бөкөлеев; Russian: Абай Чингизович Боколеев; born 3 February 1996) is a Kyrgyz professional footballer who plays as a forward for Dordoi Bishkek.

== Career statistics ==
=== International ===
Kyrgyzstan national team
Year	Apps	Goals
2019	1	0
2020	0	0
2021	2	1
Total	3	1

Statistics accurate as of match played 11 June 2021

No.	Date	Venue	Opponent	Score	Result	Competition
1.	11 June 2021	Yanmar Stadium Nagai, Osaka	Myanmar	7–0	8–1	2022 FIFA World Cup qualification

== Honours ==
Dordoi Bishkek

- Kyrgyz Premier League (2): 2018, 2020
- Kyrgyzstan Cup (1): 2018
