= Yntymak Arena =

Stadium in Karakol, Kyrgyzstan

- Stadium in May 2023, before refurbishment
- Interactive map of Yntymak Arena
- Former names: Karakol Central Stadium
- Location: Karakol, Kyrgyzstan
- Coordinates: 42.4852°N 78.3889°E
- Capacity: 3,380
- Surface: Artificial turf

Construction
- Renovated: 2024–2025

Tenant
- FC Bars Issyk-Kul

The Yntymak Arena (formerly known as Karakol Central Stadium) is an association football stadium in Karakol, Kyrgyzstan. With a capacity of 8,000 it is the largest football venue in the Issyk-Kul Region.

== History ==
The stadium was originally built in the time of the Soviet Union for the training of athletes in highland conditions. In 1972, the building was declared unsafe because of its deteriorating condition. In 2019, the Uzbekistan women's national football team defeated Nepal at the stadium in the final of the inaugural Nadezhda Cup.

In December 2022 it was announced that the stadium would undergo a total reconstruction with a cost of 23.8 million Kyrgyz soms. Construction was well underway as of summer 2024 with an updated cost of 342 million soms for the expanded project which included two adjacent training fields. The project, which also included installing fencing and new lighting, was expected to be complete by fall 2024.

In late 2024, it was announced that the stadium would become the home venue of Kyrgyz Premier League club FC Bars Issyk-Kul beginning with the 2025 season. The completed stadium was officially opened with a ceremony on 23 May 2025. At the ceremony, the stadium's new name of Yntymak Arena was announced. Features of the new stadium included seating for 3,380 spectators and the first VAR system in the country. Following the ceremony FC Bars played its first-ever match at the stadium, an eleventh-round fixture against FC OshSU-Aldier.
