= 2021 Three Nations Cup (Kyrgyzstan) =

International football tournament

Tournament details
- Host country: Kyrgyzstan
- City: Bishkek
- Dates: 2 – 7 September 2021
- Teams: 3 (from 1 confederation)
- Venue: 1 (in 1 host city)

Final positions
- Champions: Kyrgyzstan
- Runners-up: Palestine
- Third place: Bangladesh

Tournament statistics
- Matches played: 3
- Goals scored: 8 (2.67 per match)

The 2021 Three Nations Cup was a friendly international association football tournament organised and controlled by the Kyrgyz Football Union (KFU). The tournament was held in the Dolen Omurzakov Stadium.

== Participating nations ==
With FIFA Rankings, as of August 12, 2021

- Kyrgyzstan (101)
- Palestine (102)
- Bangladesh (188)

== Standings ==
Pos	Team	Pld	W	D	L	GF	GA	GD	Pts
1	Kyrgyzstan (H, C)	2	2	0	0	5	1	+4	6
2	Palestine	2	1	0	1	2	1	+1	3
3	Bangladesh	2	0	0	2	1	6	−5	0

Source: KFU
(C) Champions; (H) Hosts

== Matches ==
- Times listed are UTC+06:00.
2 September 2021
20:30

Kyrgyzstan	1–0	Palestine
Azarov 26'	Report

Dolen Omurzakov Stadium, Bishkek

5 September 2021
20:30

Palestine	2–0	Bangladesh
Kharoub 33'; Hamed 47'	Report

Dolen Omurzakov Stadium, Bishkek

7 September 2021
20:30

Kyrgyzstan	4–1	Bangladesh
Moldozhunusov 10'; Shukurov 39'; Rustamov 46'; Duyshobekov 89'	Report	Sufil 53'

Dolen Omurzakov Stadium, Bishkek
Attendance: 14,000
Referee: Rustam Lutfullin (Uzbekistan)

== Statistics ==
=== Goalscorers ===
There were 8 goals scored in 3 matches, for an average of 2.67 goals per match.

1 goal

- (Bangladesh) Mahbubur Rahman Sufil
- (Kyrgyzstan) Alimardon Shukurov
- (Kyrgyzstan) Azim Azarov
- (Kyrgyzstan) Bakhtiyar Duyshobekov
- (Kyrgyzstan) Eldar Moldozhunusov
- (Kyrgyzstan) Tursunali Rustamov
- (Palestine) Layth Kharoub
- (Palestine) Yaser Hamed
