= Bakhtiyar Duyshobekov =

Kyrgyz footballer (born 1995)

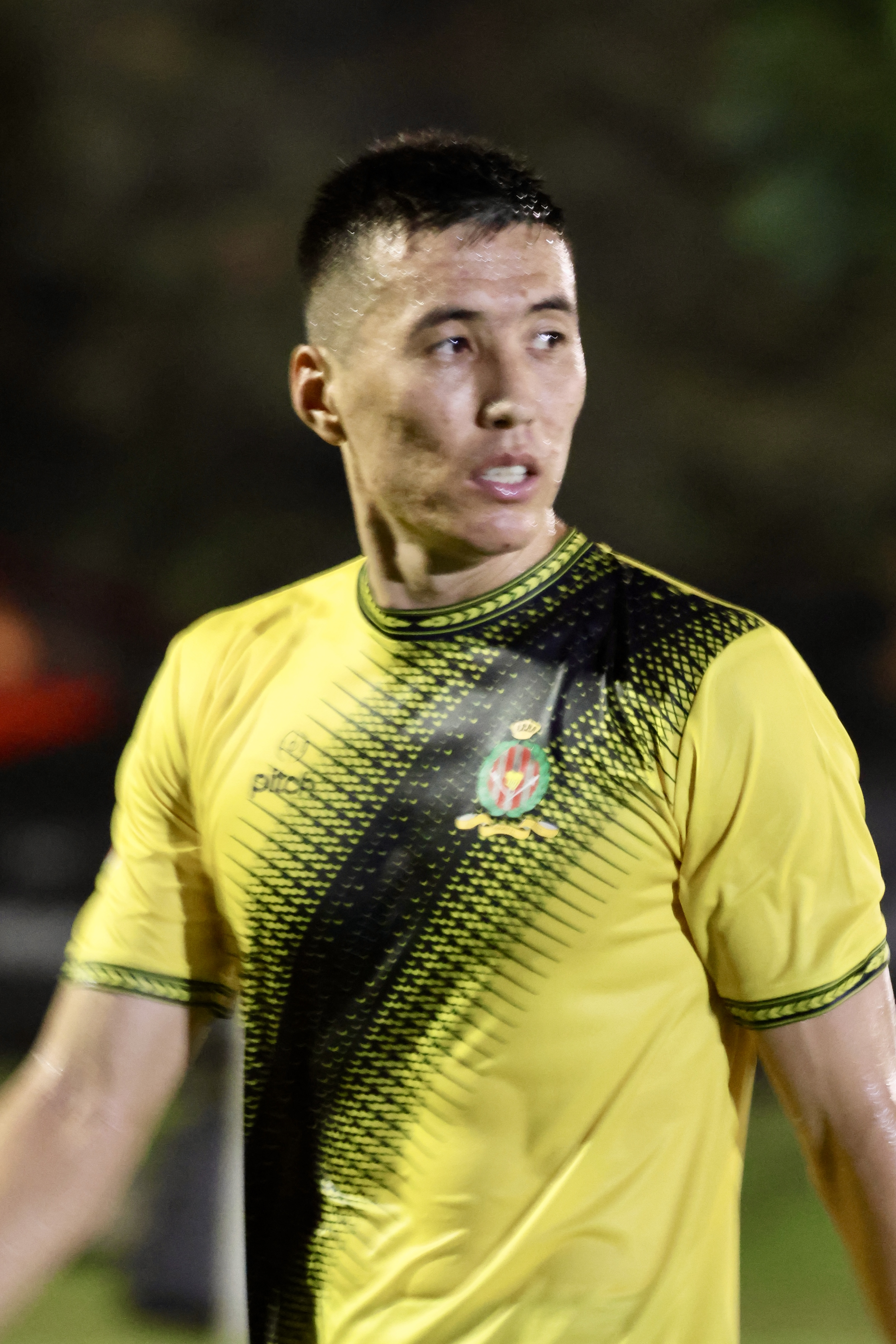
- Duyshobekov with DPMM II in 2024

Personal information
- Full name: Bakhtiyar Duyshobekov
- Date of birth: 3 June 1995 (age 31)
- Place of birth: Kürmöntü, Kyrgyzstan
- Height: 1.83 m (6 ft 0 in)
- Position: Defensive midfielder

Team information
- Current team: Bars

Senior career*
Years	Team	Apps	(Gls)
2012	Dinamo MVD Bishkek		
2012–2015	Abdysh-Ata Kant		
2016	Krumkachy Minsk	0	(0)
2017	Eğirdirspor		
2017	Abdysh-Ata Kant		
2017–2018	Dordoi Bishkek		
2018	Kelantan	9	(0)
2018–2020	Bashundhara Kings	29	(9)
2021	Sheikh Russel	23	(6)
2022	Alay Osh	25	(2)
2023	Muras United	25	(7)
2024	Alga Bishkek	11	(4)
2024	DPMM II	9	(2)
2025	Neftchi Kochkor-Ata		
2025	Alay Osh		
2026–	Bars		

International career^{‡}
2015–2016	Kyrgyzstan U21	6	(1)
2014–2024	Kyrgyzstan	44	(2)
- * Club domestic league appearances and goals as of 1 February 2025 ‡ National team caps and goals as of 25 January 2024

Bakhtiyar Duyshobekov (Kyrgyz: Бактыяр Дүйшөбеков; Russian: Бахтияр Дуйшобеков; born 3 June 1995) is a Kyrgyz professional footballer who plays as a defensive midfielder for Bars Issyk-Kul and the Kyrgyzstan national team.

== Club career ==
=== Dordoi Bishkek ===
In December 2017, Duyshobekov signed for Kyrgyzstan League team FC Dordoi Bishkek. Dordoi Bishkek announced that they had mutual agreed to end Duyshobekov's contract on 4 June 2018.

=== Kelantan ===
Duyshobekov joined Malaysia Super League team Kelantan in June 2018. He played 9 matches in 2018 Malaysia Super League. He left the team at the end of the season when his contract expired.

=== Bashundhara Kings ===
Duyshobekov joined Bangladesh Premier League team Bashundhara Kings in later 2018 to play Bangladesh Premier League. He recorded 7 goals and 10 assists in 23 matches in the league helping Bashundhara Kings to lift the Premier League trophy for the first time ever.

=== Sheikh Russel KC ===
On 12 December 2020, Duyshobekov joined Sheikh Russel KC in Bangladesh Premier League.

=== DPMM II ===
In August 2024, Duyshobekov moved to the domestic team of Bruneian club DPMM II, which plays in the 2024–25 Brunei Super League. After two goals in nine games, he left DPMM halfway into the season.

== Career statistics ==
=== Club ===
As of match played 2 September 2019.

Appearances and goals by club, season and competition
Club	Season	League				Cup			League Cup			Continental			Total		
Club	Season	Division	Apps	Goals	Assists	Apps	Goals	Assists	Apps	Goals	Assists	Apps	Goals	Assists	Apps	Goals	Assists
Eğirdirspor	2016-17	Turkish Regional Amateur League	17	5	0	0	0	0	0	0	0	0	0	0	17	5	0
Dordoi Bishkek	2018	Kyrgyz Premier League	0	0	0	0	0	0	0	0	0	2	0	0	2	0	0
Kelantan	2018	Malaysia Super League	9	0	0	0	0	0	0	0	0	0	–	–	9	0	0
Bashundhara Kings	2019	Bangladesh Premier League	29	9	10	11	0	0	0	0	0	1	0	0	41	9	10
Career Total			55	14	10	11	0	0	0	0	0	3	0	0	69	14	10

=== International ===
Kyrgyzstan national team
Year	Apps	Goals
2015	6	1
2016	8	0
2017	3	0
2018	4	0
2019	2	0
Total	23	1

==== International goals ====
Score and Result lists Kyrgyzstan goals first

#	Date	Venue	Opponent	Score	Result	Competition
1	8 October 2015	Spartak Stadium, Bishkek, Kyrgyzstan	Tajikistan	1–0	2–2	2018 FIFA World Cup qualification
2	7 September 2021	Dolen Omurzakov Stadium,Bishkek, Kyrgyzstan	Bangladesh	4–1	4–1	2021 Three Nations Cup
