= Eldar Moldozhunusov =

Kyrgyz footballer (born 1995)

Personal information
- Full name: Eldar Ulanovich Moldozhunusov
- Date of birth: 15 September 1995 (age 31)
- Place of birth: Bishkek, Kyrgyzstan
- Height: 1.81 m (5 ft 11 1/2 in)
- Position: Forward

Team information
- Current team: Neftchi Kochkor-Ata
- Number: 9

Senior career*
Years	Team	Apps	(Gls)
2014	Manas Talas		
2015	KG United		
2016–2017	Abdysh-Ata Kant		
2018–2021	Neftchi Kochkor-Ata	21	(6)
2021–2022	Alay Osh	27	(8)
2022–2023	Neftchi Kochkor-Ata	25	(14)
2023	Gokulam Kerala	10	(0)
2023–	Neftchi Kochkor-Ata	0	(0)

International career^{‡}
2021–	Kyrgyzstan	8	(1)
- * Club domestic league appearances and goals as of 18:32, 6 March 2023 (UTC) ‡ National team caps and goals as of 28 April 2022

Eldar Ulanovich Moldozhunusov (Kyrgyz: Элдар Молдожунусов; Russian: Эльдар Уланович Молдожунусов; born 15 September 1995) is a Kyrgyz professional footballer who plays as a forward for Neftchi Kochkor-Ata and the Kyrgyzstan national team.

== Club career ==
In January 2023, Moldozhunusov moved to India, signing with I-League defending champions Gokulam Kerala on a season-long deal.

== Career statistics ==
=== International ===
Kyrgyzstan national team
Year	Apps	Goals
2021	7	1
2021	1	0
Total	8	1

Statistics accurate as of match played 29 March 2022

==== International goals ====
Scores and results list Kyrgyzstan's goal tally first.

No.	Date	Venue	Opponent	Score	Result	Competition
1.	7 September 2021	Dolen Omurzakov Stadium, Bishkek, Kyrgyzstan	Bangladesh	1–0	4–1	Friendly

== Honours ==
Neftchi Kochkor-Ata

- Kyrgyzstan Cup: 2019
