= Dolen Omurzakov Stadium =

Sports venue in Bishkek, Kyrgyzstan

Coordinates: 42°52′48.63″N 74°35′52.58″E

- Interactive map of Dolen Omurzakov Stadium
- Location: Bishkek, Kyrgyzstan
- Owner: FFKR
- Operator: KTRK
- Capacity: 23,000
- Surface: Grass
- Scoreboard: Yes

Construction
- Groundbreaking: 1939
- Built: 1941
- Opened: 1941
- Renovated: 1963

Tenant
- Kyrgyzstan national football team

The Dolen Omurzakov Stadium is a multi-purpose stadium in Bishkek, Kyrgyzstan. It is currently used mostly for football matches. The stadium holds 23,000 and is the home ground of the Kyrgyzstan national football team, Dordoi Bishkek, Alga Bishkek, Asiagoal Bishkek and FC Bishkek City. It has previously been known as the Spartak Stadium.

== International matches ==
16 September 2016	Kyrgyzstan	1–2	Philippines	International Friendly
--:-- UTC+6	Lux 60'		Ingreso 43'; Bahadoran 52'

6 October 2016	Kyrgyzstan	0–0	Lebanon	International Friendly
--:-- UTC+6				Referee: Aleksandr Gauzer (Kazakhstan)

11 October 2016	Kyrgyzstan	1–0	Turkmenistan	International Friendly
--:-- UTC+6	Kozubaev 77'			Referee: Aleksandr Gauzer (Kazakhstan)

28 March 2017	Kyrgyzstan	1–0	Macau	2023 AFC ACQ
19:30 UTC+6	Baymatov 70'	Report		Attendance: 10,600; Referee: Masoud Tufayelieh (Syria)

27 March 2018	Kyrgyzstan	2–1	India	2019 AFC ACQ
20:00 UTC+6	Zemlianukhin 2'; Murzaev 72'	Report	Lalpekhlua 87'	Attendance: 9,588; Referee: Ammar Al-Jeneibi (United Arab Emirates)

6 September 2018	Kyrgyzstan	1–1	Palestine	International Friendly
21:00 UTC+6	Murzaev 2'	Report	Dabbagh 39'	Attendance: 5,200; Referee: Aleksandr Aliyev (Kazakhstan)

10 September 2018	Kyrgyzstan	2–1	Syria	International Friendly
20:00 UTC+6	Zhyrgalbek Uulu 77'; Sagynbaev 87'	Report	Al Soma 81' (pen.)	Attendance: 7,000; Referee: Aleksandr Aliyev (Kazakhstan)

11 June 2019	Kyrgyzstan	2–2	Palestine	International Friendly
20:00 UTC+6	Rustamov 31'; Murzaev 49'	Report	Seyam 57'; Bahdari 88' (pen.)	Referee: Artyom Kuchin (Kazakhstan)

10 October 2019	Kyrgyzstan	7–0	Myanmar	2022 FIFA World Cup qualification
20:30 UTC+6	Bernhardt 5', 10', 87' (pen.); Shukurov 20', 71'; Alykulov 26'; Kichin 45'	Report (FIFA); Report (AFC)		Attendance: 13,000; Referee: Omar Mohamed Al-Ali (United Arab Emirates)

14 November 2019	Kyrgyzstan	0–2	Japan	2022 FIFA World Cup qualification
17:15 UTC+6		Report (FIFA); Report (AFC)	Minamino 41' (pen.); Haraguchi 54'	Attendance: 17,543; Referee: Mohammed Al-Hoish (Saudi Arabia)

19 November 2019	Kyrgyzstan	1–1	Tajikistan	2022 FIFA World Cup qualification
20:00 UTC+6	Kozubaev 83'	Report (FIFA); Report (AFC)	Ergashev 17'	Attendance: 15,843; Referee: Abdulrahman Al-Jassim (Qatar)

2 September 2021	Kyrgyzstan	1–0	Palestine	Three Nations Cup
20:30 UTC+6	Azarov 26'	Report		Attendance: 14,500; Referee: Akhrol Riskullaev (Uzbekistan)

7 September 2021	Kyrgyzstan	4–1	Bangladesh	Three Nations Cup
20:30 UTC+6	Moldozhunusov 10'; Shukurov 39'; Rustamov 46'; Duyshobekov 89'	Report	Sufil 53'	Attendance: 14,000; Referee: Rustam Lutfullin (Uzbekistan)

8 June 2022	Tajikistan	4–0	Myanmar	2023 AFC ACQ
16:30 UTC+6	Mabatshoev (9}), 57'; Dzhalilov 56' (pen.); Panjshanbe 84'	Report		Attendance: 50; Referee: Ammar Mahfoodh (Bahrain)

8 June 2022	Kyrgyzstan	2–1	Singapore	2023 AFC ACQ
20:00 UTC+6	Kichin 77' (pen.); Maier 82'	Report	Song 57'	Attendance: 7322; Referee: Feras Taweel

11 June 2022	Singapore	0–1	Tajikistan	2023 AFC ACQ
16:30 UTC+6		Report	Mabatshoev 53'	Attendance: 84; Referee: Mohammad Ghabayan

11 June 2022	Myanmar	0–2	Kyrgyzstan	2023 AFC ACQ
20:00 UTC+6		Report	Maier 25' 45'	Attendance: 7522; Referee: Arumughan Rowan

14 September 2022	Myanmar	2–6	Singapore	2023 AFC ACQ
16:30 UTC+6	Win Naing Tun 53'; Aung Kaung Mann 66'	Report	Fandi 9' 54' 69'; Song 16'; Quak 42'; Nor 89'	Referee: Bijan Heydari (Iran)

14 June 2022	Kyrgyzstan	0–0	Tajikistan	2023 AFC ACQ
20:00 UTC+6		Report		Attendance: 17340; Referee: Ko Hyung-jin
