= 2014 Commonwealth of Independent States Cup squads =

== Group A ==
=== Estonia ===
Estonia's 20-man squad to play in the 2014 Commonwealth of Independent States Cup.

Coach: Martin Reim

No.	Pos.	Player	Date of birth (age)	Club
1	GK	Richard Aland	15 March 1994 (age 31)	(Estonian Football Association) Kalju
2	DF	Trevor Elhi	11 April 1993 (age 32)	(Estonian Football Association) Infonet
3	DF	Vladimir Avilov	10 March 1995 (age 30)	(Estonian Football Association) Infonet
4	DF	Karol Mets	16 May 1993 (age 32)	(Estonian Football Association) Flora
5	DF	Artur Pikk	5 March 1993 (age 32)	(Estonian Football Association) Levadia
6	MF	Brent Lepistu	26 March 1993 (age 32)	(Estonian Football Association) Flora
7	MF	Pavel Marin	14 June 1995 (age 30)	(Estonian Football Association) Levadia
8	MF	Andreas Raudsepp	13 December 1993 (age 32)	(Estonian Football Association) Levadia
9	FW	Kevin Kauber	23 March 1995 (age 30)	(Football Association of Finland) ÅIFK
10	MF	Lauri Välja	25 May 1995 (age 30)	(Estonian Football Association) Tallinna Kalev
11	MF	Maksim Gussev	20 July 1994 (age 31)	(Estonian Football Association) Flora
12	GK	Kristjan Tamme	21 September 1995 (age 30)	(Estonian Football Association) Levadia
14	FW	Bogdan Vaštšuk	4 October 1995 (age 30)	(The Football Association) Reading
15	MF	Martin Ustaal	6 March 1993 (age 32)	(Estonian Football Association) Paide LM
16	FW	Robert Kirss	3 September 1994 (age 31)	(Estonian Football Association) Kalju
17	DF	Kevin Aloe	7 July 1995 (age 30)	(Estonian Football Association) Flora
18	MF	Tauno Tekko	14 December 1994 (age 31)	(Estonian Football Association) Tammeka
19	DF	Madis Vihmann	5 October 1995 (age 30)	(Estonian Football Association) Levadia
20	DF	Johannes Kukebal	19 July 1993 (age 32)	(Estonian Football Association) Tallinna Kalev
21	MF	Nikita Martõnov	4 September 1993 (age 32)	(Estonian Football Association) Infonet

=== Tajikistan ===
Tajikistan 20 man squad to play in the 2014 Commonwealth of Independent States Cup.

Coach: Makhmadjon Khabibulloev

No.	Pos.	Player	Date of birth (age)	Club
1	GK	Emomali Saniev	7 November 1996 (age 29)	(Tajikistan Football Federation) Istiqlol
2	DF	Farrukh Fuzaylov	30 September 1995 (age 30)	(Tajikistan Football Federation) Parvoz
3	DF	Khurshed Beknazarov	26 June 1994 (age 31)	(Tajikistan Football Federation) Vakhsh
4	DF	Alisher Sharipov	22 April 1994 (age 31)	(Tajikistan Football Federation) Regar-TadAZ
5	DF	Bakhtiar Asimov	4 July 1994 (age 31)	(Tajikistan Football Federation) Energetik
6	MF	Amirbek Juraboev	13 April 1996 (age 29)	(Russian Football Union) CSKA Moscow
7	FW	Navruz Rustamov	18 March 1993 (age 32)	(Tajikistan Football Federation) Vakhsh
8	MF	Faridoon Sharipov	8 September 1994 (age 31)	(Tajikistan Football Federation) CSKA Pomir
9	MF	Komron Tursunov	24 April 1996 (age 29)	(Tajikistan Football Federation) RTSU
10	MF	Jahongir Ergashev	6 March 1994 (age 31)	(Tajikistan Football Federation) Istiqlol
11	FW	Firuz Rakhmatov	20 March 1994 (age 31)	(Tajikistan Football Federation) Regar-TadAZ
13	DF	Saidhoni Amrohon	6 June 1994 (age 31)	(Tajikistan Football Federation) Ravshan
14	MF	Oybek Abdugafforov	30 March 1995 (age 30)	(Tajikistan Football Federation) Energetik
16	GK	Muminjon Gadoyboev	18 March 1993 (age 32)	(Tajikistan Football Federation) Khujand
17	MF	Abdella Said	25 January 1994 (age 32)	(Tajikistan Football Federation) Energetik
19	MF	Romish Jalilov	21 November 1995 (age 30)	(Tajikistan Football Federation) Istiqlol
21	MF	Abdurasul Rakhmonov	13 February 1994 (age 32)	(Tajikistan Football Federation) Regar-TadAZ
23	DF	Firdavs Tusmatov	6 March 1994 (age 31)	(Tajikistan Football Federation) Regar-TadAZ
24	DF	Safarzoda Fakhriddini	13 March 1993 (age 32)	(Tajikistan Football Federation) Bark
27	MF	Shodmon Togoyzoda	7 September 1994 (age 31)	(Tajikistan Football Federation) Regar-TadAZ

=== Ukraine ===
Ukraine 23 man squad to play in the 2014 Commonwealth of Independent States Cup.

Coach: Serhiy Kovalets

No.	Pos.	Player	Date of birth (age)	Club
1	GK	Oleksandr Tkachenko	19 February 1993 (age 33)	(Ukrainian Association of Football) Vorskla Poltava
2	DF	Mykhaylo Pysko	19 March 1993 (age 32)	(Ukrainian Association of Football) Shakhtar Donetsk
3	DF	Serhiy Vakulenko	7 September 1993 (age 32)	(Ukrainian Association of Football) Shakhtar Donetsk
4	DF	Anton Bratkov	14 May 1993 (age 32)	(Ukrainian Association of Football) Dynamo-2 Kyiv
5	MF	Vitaliy Pryndeta	2 February 1993 (age 33)	(Ukrainian Association of Football) Volyn Lutsk
6	MF	Dmytro Myshnyov	26 January 1994 (age 32)	(Ukrainian Association of Football) Illichivets Mariupol
7	MF	Vladlen Yurchenko	22 January 1994 (age 32)	(Ukrainian Association of Football) Shakhtar Donetsk
8	MF	Redvan Memeshev	15 August 1993 (age 32)	(Ukrainian Association of Football) Volyn Lutsk
9	MF	Vladyslav Kalitvintsev	4 January 1993 (age 33)	(Ukrainian Association of Football) Dynamo Kyiv
10	FW	Andriy Totovytskyi	20 January 1993 (age 33)	(Ukrainian Association of Football) Illichivets Mariupol
11	FW	Leonid Akulinin	7 March 1993 (age 32)	(Ukrainian Association of Football) Shakhtar Donetsk
12	GK	Zauri Makharadze	24 March 1993 (age 32)	(Ukrainian Association of Football) Olimpik Donetsk
14	MF	Ruslan Malinovskyi	4 May 1993 (age 32)	(Ukrainian Association of Football) Zorya Luhansk
15	DF	Oleksandr Svatok	27 September 1994 (age 31)	(Ukrainian Association of Football) Dnipro Dnipropetrovsk
16	DF	Denys Miroshnichenko	1 October 1994 (age 31)	(Ukrainian Association of Football) Karpaty Lviv
17	MF	Taras Puchkovskyi	23 August 1994 (age 31)	(Ukrainian Association of Football) Karpaty Lviv
18	MF	Serhiy Myakushko	15 April 1993 (age 32)	(Ukrainian Association of Football) Dynamo-2 Kyiv
19	DF	Ihor Honchar	10 January 1993 (age 33)	(Ukrainian Association of Football) Shakhtar-3 Donetsk
21	MF	Andriy Bliznichenko	24 July 1994 (age 31)	(Ukrainian Association of Football) Dnipro Dnipropetrovsk
22	MF	Pavlo Savelenko	14 July 1993 (age 32)	(Ukrainian Association of Football) Metalurh Zaporizhia
	GK	Oleksandr Dyachenko	1 March 1994 (age 31)	(Ukrainian Association of Football) Obolon-Brovar
	DF	Yevhen Pasich	13 July 1993 (age 32)	(Ukrainian Association of Football) Dnipro Dnipropetrovsk
	MF	Artem Favorov	19 March 1994 (age 31)	(Ukrainian Association of Football) Dynamo-2 Kyiv

=== Kyrgyzstan ===
Kyrgyzstan 22 man squad to play in the 2014 Commonwealth of Independent States Cup.

Coach: Anarbek Ormonbekov

No.	Pos.	Player	Date of birth (age)	Club
1	GK	Ilim Omorov	22 November 1995 (age 30)	(Kyrgyz Football Union) Alga Bishkek
2	DF	Mustafa Yusupov	1 July 1995 (age 30)	(Kyrgyz Football Union) Dordoi Bishkek
3	DF	Vladislav Barsukov	1 January 1993 (age 33)	(Kyrgyz Football Union) Ala-Too Naryn
4	DF	Kairat Kolbaev	3 March 1993 (age 32)	(Kyrgyz Football Union) Ala-Too Naryn
5	DF	Tamirlan Kozubaev	1 July 1994 (age 31)	(Kyrgyz Football Union) Ala-Too Naryn
6	DF	Sanzhar Sharsheev	9 April 1994 (age 31)	(Kyrgyz Football Union) Ala-Too Naryn
7	MF	Aman Talantbek	4 July 1993 (age 32)	(Kyrgyz Football Union) Ala-Too Naryn
8	MF	Bektur Talgat Uulu	9 September 1994 (age 31)	(Kyrgyz Football Union) Abdish-Ata Kant
9	FW	Bekzhan Sagynbaev	11 September 1994 (age 31)	(Kyrgyz Football Union) Ala-Too Naryn
10	MF	Avazbek Otkeev	4 December 1993 (age 32)	(Kyrgyz Football Union) Dordoi Bishkek
11	MF	Dinmukhamed Taalaybekov	1 January 1995 (age 31)	(Kyrgyz Football Union) Dordoi Bishkek
12	GK	Andrey Sitolenko	5 June 1993 (age 32)	(German Football Association) VfB Marburg
13	DF	Akram Umarov	7 February 1994 (age 32)	(Kyrgyz Football Union) Abdish-Ata Kant
14	DF	Manas Karipov	17 March 1995 (age 30)	(Kyrgyz Football Union) Abdish-Ata Kant
15	DF	Bekzhan Nukesh Uulu	27 August 1993 (age 32)	(Kyrgyz Football Union) Alga Bishkek
17	FW	Farhat Musabekov	3 January 1994 (age 32)	(Kyrgyz Football Union) Abdish-Ata Kant
18	MF	Akhlidin Israilov	16 September 1994 (age 31)	(Ukrainian Association of Football) Dynamo Kyiv
19	MF	Mirbeк Akhmataliev	7 February 1994 (age 32)	(Kyrgyz Football Union) Abdish-Ata Kant
20	MF	Elkhan Temirbaev	2 November 1995 (age 30)	(Kyrgyz Football Union) Ala-Too Naryn
21	DF	Egor Naydenov	12 April 1995 (age 30)	(Kyrgyz Football Union) Ala-Too Naryn
22	MF	Duvanaеv Bekmyrza	12 February 1993 (age 33)	(Kyrgyz Football Union) Alay Osh
23	FW	Kairat Zhyrgalbek Uulu	13 June 1993 (age 32)	(Kyrgyz Football Union) Abdish-Ata Kant

== Group B ==
=== Lithuania ===
Lithuania 20 man squad to play in the 2014 Commonwealth of Independent States Cup.

Coach: Arminas Narbekovas

No.	Pos.	Player	Date of birth (age)	Club
1	GK	Ignas Plūkas	8 December 1993 (age 32)	(Lithuanian Football Federation) Žalgiris
2	DF	Martynas Duda	23 January 1993 (age 33)	(Lithuanian Football Federation) Ekranas
3	DF	Justas Raziūnas	23 January 1995 (age 31)	(Lithuanian Football Federation) Šiauliai
4	DF	Lukas Pangonis	25 August 1995 (age 30)	(Lithuanian Football Federation) Stumbras
6	MF	Titas Vitukynas	23 October 1994 (age 31)	(Lithuanian Football Federation) Dainava
7	MF	Erikas Skripkinas	7 January 1995 (age 31)	(Lithuanian Football Federation) Stumbras
8	MF	Mykolas Krasnovskis	8 July 1994 (age 31)	(Lithuanian Football Federation) Žalgiris
10	FW	Simonas Stankevičius	3 October 1995 (age 30)	(The Football Association) Leicester City
11	MF	Rokas Gedminas	24 April 1996 (age 29)	(Lithuanian Football Federation) Šiauliai
12	GK	Edvinas Gertmonas	1 June 1996 (age 29)	(Lithuanian Football Federation) Tauras
13	MF	Vilius Armanavičius	8 May 1995 (age 30)	(Lithuanian Football Federation) Stumbras
14	DF	Edvinas Girdvainis	17 January 1993 (age 33)	(Lithuanian Football Federation) Ekranas
15	MF	Deimantas Petravičius	2 September 1995 (age 30)	(The Football Association) Nottingham Forest
16	DF	Lukas Narbutas	10 May 1994 (age 31)	(Lithuanian Football Federation) Ekranas
17	FW	Edvinas Baniulis	3 January 1997 (age 29)	(Lithuanian Football Federation) Žalgiris
18	FW	Klaudijus Upstas	30 October 1994 (age 31)	(Lithuanian Football Federation) Stumbras
19	MF	Tomas Salamanavičius	31 March 1993 (age 32)	(Lithuanian Football Federation) Ekranas
20	MF	Dovydas Norvilas	5 April 1993 (age 32)	(Lithuanian Football Federation) Ekranas
21	MF	Edgaras Baranauskas	12 March 1993 (age 32)	(Lithuanian Football Federation) Ekranas
23	DF	Aurimas Vilkaitis	11 February 1993 (age 33)	(Italian Football Federation) Nocerina

=== Saint Petersburg ===
Saint Petersburg 23 man squad to play in the 2014 Commonwealth of Independent States Cup.

Coach: Boris Rappoport

No.	Pos.	Player	Date of birth (age)	Club
1	GK	Daniil Sizko	4 August 1993 (age 32)	(Russian Football Union) Rus Saint Petersburg
2	DF	Roman Krivulkin	18 February 1996 (age 30)	(Russian Football Union) SDYuShOR Zenit St. Petersburg
3	MF	Maxim Pankov	31 July 1996 (age 29)	(Russian Football Union) SDYuShOR Zenit St. Petersburg
4	MF	Pavel Lyisenkov	14 January 1994 (age 32)	
5	DF	Artem Deyneko	27 November 1993 (age 32)	(Russian Football Union) Rus Saint Petersburg
6	MF	Vitaly Ivanov	11 April 1994 (age 31)	(Russian Football Union) SDYuShOR Zenit St. Petersburg
7	FW	Rizvan Umarov	5 April 1993 (age 32)	(Russian Football Union) SDYuShOR Zenit St. Petersburg
8	MF	Alexey Kayukov	9 February 1993 (age 33)	(Russian Football Union) Zenit-2 Saint Petersburg
9	FW	Alexey Zolotarenko	20 January 1993 (age 33)	(Russian Football Union) Rus Saint Petersburg
10	FW	Vladislav Efimov	21 April 1994 (age 31)	(Russian Football Union) Zenit-2 Saint Petersburg
11	FW	Alexey Panfilov	14 October 1993 (age 32)	(Russian Football Union) Zenit-2 Saint Petersburg
12	DF	Andrei Ivanov	2 September 1994 (age 31)	(Russian Football Union) Zenit-2 Saint Petersburg
13	DF	Bogdan Aslanov	15 February 1993 (age 33)	(Russian Football Union) SDYuShOR Zenit St. Petersburg
14	DF	Alexey Lyasovy	29 March 1995 (age 30)	(Russian Football Union) SDYuShOR Zenit St. Petersburg
15	DF	Dmitry Mironov	21 March 1995 (age 30)	(Russian Football Union) SDYuShOR Zenit St. Petersburg
16	GK	Anton Tsvetkov	15 January 1994 (age 32)	(Russian Football Union) Zenit-2 Saint Petersburg
17	FW	Dmitry Bogayev	24 January 1994 (age 32)	(Russian Football Union) Zenit-2 Saint Petersburg
18	DF	Alexandr Tundenkov	6 June 1994 (age 31)	(Russian Football Union) SDYuShOR Zenit St. Petersburg
19	DF	Sergey Guschin	31 August 1993 (age 32)	(Russian Football Union) SDYuShOR Zenit St. Petersburg
20	MF	Alexander Zakarlyuka	24 June 1995 (age 30)	(Russian Football Union) Zenit-2 Saint Petersburg
21	MF	Nikita Smirnov	1 April 1995 (age 30)	(Russian Football Union) SDYuShOR Zenit St. Petersburg
22	MF	Nikita Kopeikin	14 January 1996 (age 30)	(Russian Football Union) SDYuShOR Zenit St. Petersburg
23	MF	Alexey Makarov	3 July 1995 (age 30)	(Russian Football Union) Zenit-2 Saint Petersburg

=== Russia ===
Russia 23 man squad to play in the 2014 Commonwealth of Independent States Cup.

Coach: Nikolai Pisarev

No.	Pos.	Player	Date of birth (age)	Club
1	GK	Artyom Leonov	28 June 1994 (age 31)	(Russian Football Union) Krasnodar-2
2	DF	Maksim Karpov	17 March 1995 (age 30)	(Russian Football Union) Zenit-2 Saint Petersburg
3	DF	Ilya Zuyev	25 January 1994 (age 32)	(Russian Football Union) Zenit-2 Saint Petersburg
4	DF	Sandro Tsveiba	5 September 1993 (age 32)	(Russian Football Union) Rus Saint Petersburg
5	DF	Aleksandr Kalyashin	24 January 1995 (age 31)	(Russian Football Union) Dynamo-2 Moscow
6	MF	Albert Sharipov	11 April 1993 (age 32)	(Russian Football Union) Fakel Voronezh
7	MF	Nika Chkhapeliya	26 April 1994 (age 31)	(Russian Football Union) Krasnodar-2
8	MF	Andrei Pridyuk	25 February 1994 (age 32)	(Russian Football Union) Amkar-2 Perm
9	MF	Pavel Mogilevets	25 January 1993 (age 33)	(Russian Football Union) Zenit-2 Saint Petersburg
10	FW	Vadim Manzon	5 December 1994 (age 31)	(Russian Football Union) Strogino Moscow
11	FW	Ruslan Bolov	7 May 1994 (age 31)	(Russian Football Union) Krasnodar
12	GK	Vyacheslav Isupov	16 January 1993 (age 33)	(Russian Football Union) Lokomotiv-2 Moscow
13	DF	Alexandr Yarkovoy	10 February 1993 (age 33)	(Russian Football Union) Khimki
14	MF	Aleksandr Pantsyrev	8 December 1993 (age 32)	(Russian Football Union) Amkar-2 Perm
15	MF	Batraz Khadartsev	23 May 1993 (age 32)	(Russian Football Union) Alania Vladikavkaz
16	MF	Aleksandr Zakuskin	12 March 1993 (age 32)	(Russian Football Union) Lokomotiv-2 Moscow
17	MF	Vladimir Zubarev	5 January 1993 (age 33)	(Russian Football Union) Spartak-2 Moscow
18	DF	Denis Kutin	5 October 1993 (age 32)	(Russian Football Union) Spartak-2 Moscow
19	MF	Mikhail Zemskov	2 May 1994 (age 31)	(Russian Football Union) Torpedo Vladimir
20	MF	Artyom Yarmolitsky	10 April 1994 (age 31)	(Russian Football Union) Dynamo-2 Moscow
21	DF	Vladislav Ovsyannikov	15 February 1994 (age 32)	(Russian Football Union) Strogino Moscow
22	FW	Sergei Zuykov	19 September 1993 (age 32)	(Russian Football Union) Volgar Astrakhan
23	GK	Ivan Konovalov	18 August 1994 (age 31)	(Russian Football Union) Amkar-2 Perm

=== Moldova ===
Moldova 23 man squad to play in the 2014 Commonwealth of Independent States Cup.

Coach: Alexandru Curtianu

No.	Pos.	Player	Date of birth (age)	Club
1	GK	Cristian Avram	27 July 1994 (age 31)	(Moldovan Football Federation) Academia Chișinău
2	DF	Artur Apostolov	15 June 1994 (age 31)	(Moldovan Football Federation) Sheriff Tiraspol
3	DF	Maximilian Modrica	15 June 1993 (age 32)	(Moldovan Football Federation) Dacia Chișinău
4	DF	Dinu Graur	27 December 1994 (age 31)	(Moldovan Football Federation) Zimbru Chișinău
5	DF	Constantin Bogdan	29 December 1993 (age 32)	(Moldovan Football Federation) Zimbru Chișinău
6	MF	Vasile Jardan	20 July 1993 (age 32)	(Moldovan Football Federation) Dacia Chișinău
7	FW	Dan Spătaru	24 May 1994 (age 31)	(Moldovan Football Federation) Zimbru Chișinău
8	MF	Vadim Rață	5 May 1993 (age 32)	(Moldovan Football Federation) Sheriff Tiraspol
9	MF	Gheorghe Anton	27 January 1993 (age 33)	(Moldovan Football Federation) Zimbru Chișinău
10	MF	Catalin Carp	20 October 1993 (age 32)	(Ukrainian Association of Football) Dynamo Kyiv
11	FW	Vitalie Zlatan	8 April 1993 (age 32)	(Moldovan Football Federation) Milsami
12	GK	Radu Mitu	4 November 1994 (age 31)	(Moldovan Football Federation) Milsami
13	FW	Igor Dima	11 February 1993 (age 33)	(Moldovan Football Federation) Tiraspol
14	MF	Iurie Mirza	5 March 1993 (age 32)	(Moldovan Football Federation) Tiraspol
15	MF	Valeriu Tiron	8 April 1993 (age 32)	(Moldovan Football Federation) Veris
16	DF	Marcel Dulgheru	30 June 1994 (age 31)	(Moldovan Football Federation) Speranța Crihana Veche
17	MF	Veaceslav Lisa	24 May 1993 (age 32)	(Moldovan Football Federation) Sheriff Tiraspol
18	DF	Alexandr Bolsacov	19 November 1994 (age 31)	(Moldovan Football Federation) Sheriff Tiraspol
19	DF	Boris Tugui	28 August 1993 (age 32)	(Moldovan Football Federation) Speranța Crihana Veche
20	FW	Ion Ursu	19 August 1994 (age 31)	(Moldovan Football Federation) Veris
23	GK	Victor Buga	29 June 1994 (age 31)	(Moldovan Football Federation) Zimbru Chișinău

== Group C ==
=== Latvia ===
Latvia 20 man squad to play in the 2014 Commonwealth of Independent States Cup.

Coach: Dainis Kazakevičs

No.	Pos.	Player	Date of birth (age)	Club
1	GK	Raivo Varažinskis	7 March 1993 (age 32)	(Latvian Football Federation) Liepājas Metalurgs
2	DF	Madis Miķelsons	18 January 1994 (age 32)	(Latvian Football Federation) Liepājas Metalurgs
3	MF	Artjoms Loginovs	20 July 1993 (age 32)	(Latvian Football Federation) Jūrmala
4	DF	Vitālijs Barinovs	4 May 1994 (age 31)	(Latvian Football Federation) Ventspils
5	MF	Kārlis Kņūts	18 June 1995 (age 30)	(Latvian Football Federation) Spartaks Jūrmala
6	DF	Reinis Flaksis	3 April 1994 (age 31)	(Latvian Football Federation) Liepājas Metalurgs
7	MF	Edgars Vardanjans	9 May 1993 (age 32)	(Latvian Football Federation) Metta
8	MF	Jevgēņijs Kazačoks	12 August 1995 (age 30)	(Latvian Football Federation) Spartaks Jūrmala
9	MF	Andrejs Kiriļins	3 November 1995 (age 30)	(Latvian Football Federation) Liepājas Metalurgs
10	FW	Dāvis Ikaunieks	7 January 1994 (age 32)	(Latvian Football Federation) Liepājas Metalurgs
11	FW	Kaspars Svārups	28 January 1994 (age 32)	(Latvian Football Federation) Ventspils
12	GK	Kristers Putniņš	16 July 1993 (age 32)	(Latvian Football Federation) Metta
13	DF	Aleksejs Giļničs	29 May 1993 (age 32)	(Swedish Football Association) AFC United
14	DF	Endijs Šlampe	24 July 1994 (age 31)	(Latvian Football Federation) Liepājas Metalurgs
15	DF	Dmitrijs Klimaševičs	16 April 1995 (age 30)	(Latvian Football Federation) Daugavpils
16	MF	Dāvis Indrāns	6 June 1995 (age 30)	(Latvian Football Federation) Ventspils
17	FW	Vladislavs Gutkovskis	2 April 1995 (age 30)	(Latvian Football Federation) Skonto
18	MF	Ņikita Parfjonovs	14 March 1993 (age 32)	(Latvian Football Federation) Metta
19	MF	Vladimirs Mukins	28 January 1993 (age 33)	(Latvian Football Federation) Ventspils
20	MF	Eduards Tīdenbergs	18 December 1994 (age 31)	(Latvian Football Federation) Ventspils
21	MF	Roberts Savaļnieks	4 February 1993 (age 33)	(Latvian Football Federation) Liepājas Metalurgs

=== Moscow ===
Moscow 23 man squad to play in the 2014 Commonwealth of Independent States Cup.

Coach: Vladimir Scherbak

No.	Pos.	Player	Date of birth (age)	Club
1	GK	Alexandr Radionov	30 April 1993 (age 32)	(Russian Football Union) Strogino Moscow
2	DF	Maksim Kuftin	27 September 1994 (age 31)	(Russian Football Union) Strogino Moscow
3	DF	Alexandr Tsybikov	17 January 1994 (age 32)	(Russian Football Union) Torpedo Moscow
4	DF	Anton Danilyuk	3 January 1993 (age 33)	(Russian Football Union) Lokomotiv-2 Moscow
5	DF	Georgy Burnash	8 August 1993 (age 32)	(Russian Football Union) Lokomotiv-2 Moscow
6	MF	Danila Polyakov	9 June 1993 (age 32)	(Russian Football Union) Strogino Moscow
7	MF	Ruslan Zaerko	27 June 1993 (age 32)	(Russian Football Union) Strogino Moscow
8	MF	Vladimir Sokolov	22 May 1994 (age 31)	(Russian Football Union) Strogino Moscow
9	FW	Semyon Sinyavskiy	30 September 1993 (age 32)	(Russian Football Union) Strogino Moscow
10	MF	Alexandr Morgunov	4 June 1995 (age 30)	(Russian Football Union) Dynamo Moscow
11	FW	Alexey Sutormin	10 January 1994 (age 32)	(Russian Football Union) Strogino Moscow
12	MF	Nikita Dubchak	12 August 1993 (age 32)	(Russian Football Union) Lokomotiv-2 Moscow
13	MF	Alim Dzhukkayev	23 September 1994 (age 31)	(Russian Football Union) Lokomotiv Moscow
14	MF	Maksim Merezhko	11 January 1993 (age 33)	(Russian Football Union) Strogino Moscow
15	DF	Alexey Mamonov	14 April 1993 (age 32)	(Russian Football Union) Strogino Moscow
16	GK	Yuri Shafinskiy	6 May 1994 (age 31)	(Russian Football Union) Lokomotiv-2 Moscow
17	DF	Pavel Drozdov	21 June 1993 (age 32)	(Russian Football Union) Strogino Moscow
18	MF	Gadzhi Adzhiyev	1 June 1994 (age 31)	(Russian Football Union) Strogino Moscow
19	FW	Aleksei Kurzenyov	9 January 1995 (age 31)	(Russian Football Union) Sports school CSKA
20	MF	Evgeny Ivaschenko	21 September 1993 (age 32)	(Russian Football Union) Strogino Moscow
21	MF	Panayot Khartiyadi	7 May 1993 (age 32)	(Russian Football Union) Lokomotiv-2 Moscow
22	FW	Ivan Sergeyev	11 May 1995 (age 30)	(Russian Football Union) Strogino Moscow
23	GK	Aleksandr Savvin	5 January 1995 (age 31)	(Russian Football Union) Sports school Chertanovo

=== Belarus ===
Belarus 20 man squad to play in the 2014 Commonwealth of Independent States Cup.

Coach: Igor Kovalevich

No.	Pos.	Player	Date of birth (age)	Club
1	GK	Vladislav Vasilyuchek	28 March 1994 (age 31)	(Football Federation of Belarus) Neman Grodno
2	DF	Yevgeniy Klopotskiy	12 August 1993 (age 32)	(Football Federation of Belarus) Dinamo Brest
3	DF	Sergey Karpovich	29 March 1994 (age 31)	(Football Federation of Belarus) Bereza-2010
4	DF	Semen Shestilovsky	30 May 1994 (age 31)	(Football Federation of Belarus) Bereza-2010
5	MF	Anton Shramchenko	12 March 1993 (age 32)	(Football Federation of Belarus) Dnepr Mogilev
6	DF	Pavel Nazarenko	20 January 1995 (age 31)	(Football Federation of Belarus) Dinamo Minsk
7	MF	Artem Gurenko	1 June 1994 (age 31)	(Football Federation of Belarus) Minsk-2
8	MF	Pavel Savitskiy	12 July 1994 (age 31)	(Football Federation of Belarus) Neman Grodno
9	MF	Yury Kavalyow	27 January 1993 (age 33)	(Football Federation of Belarus) Shakhtyor Soligorsk
10	FW	Yawhen Lebedzew	29 December 1994 (age 31)	(Football Federation of Belarus) Shakhtyor Soligorsk
11	FW	Gleb Rassadkin	5 April 1995 (age 30)	(Football Federation of Belarus) Dinamo Minsk
12	GK	Matvey Frantskevich	18 March 1995 (age 30)	(Football Federation of Belarus) Belshina Bobruisk
13	DF	Artem Sokol	30 March 1994 (age 31)	(Football Federation of Belarus) Dinamo Minsk
14	MF	Aleksandr Yanchenko	14 February 1995 (age 31)	(Football Federation of Belarus) Gomel
15	MF	Vladislav Zhuk	11 June 1994 (age 31)	(Football Federation of Belarus) Zvezda-BGU Minsk
16	MF	Yevgeniy Yablonskiy	10 May 1995 (age 30)	(Football Federation of Belarus) BATE Borisov
17	DF	Aleksey Zaleski	7 October 1994 (age 31)	(Football Federation of Belarus) Bereza-2010
18	DF	Aleksandr Poznyak	23 July 1994 (age 31)	(Football Federation of Belarus) Neman Grodno
19	MF	Nikita Kaplenko	18 September 1995 (age 30)	(Football Federation of Belarus) Dinamo Minsk
20	MF	Yevgeniy Yelezarenko	4 July 1993 (age 32)	(Football Federation of Belarus) Naftan Novopolotsk

=== Kazakhstan ===
Kazakhstan 20 man squad to play in the 2014 Commonwealth of Independent States Cup.

Coach: Saulius Širmelis

No.	Pos.	Player	Date of birth (age)	Club
1	GK	Alexander Zarutsky	26 August 1993 (age 32)	(Kazakhstan Football Federation) Shakhter Karagandy
3	DF	Timur Rudoselskiy	21 December 1994 (age 31)	(Kazakhstan Football Federation) Kairat
4	DF	Grigori Sartakov	19 August 1994 (age 31)	(Kazakhstan Football Federation) Irtysh Pavlodar
5	DF	Kirill Pasichnik	24 May 1993 (age 32)	(Kazakhstan Football Federation) Atyrau
6	MF	Magamed Uzdenov	25 February 1994 (age 32)	(Kazakhstan Football Federation) Kaisar
7	FW	Stanislav Lunin	2 May 1993 (age 32)	(Kazakhstan Football Federation) Shakhter Karagandy
8	DF	Maksim Grek	26 March 1993 (age 32)	(Kazakhstan Football Federation) Ordabasy
9	MF	Bauyrzhan Islamkhan	23 February 1993 (age 33)	(Kazakhstan Football Federation) Astana
10	MF	Georgy Zhukov	19 November 1994 (age 31)	(Kazakhstan Football Federation) Astana
11	MF	Altynbek Dauletkhanov	18 May 1993 (age 32)	(Kazakhstan Football Federation) Irtysh Pavlodar
12	FW	Toktar Zhangylyshbay	25 May 1993 (age 32)	(Kazakhstan Football Federation) Shakhter Karagandy
13	FW	Vitali Lee	13 March 1994 (age 31)	(Kazakhstan Football Federation) Shakhter Karagandy
14	FW	Roman Murtazayev	10 September 1993 (age 32)	(Kazakhstan Football Federation) Shakhter Karagandy
15	DF	Dmitri Schmidt	17 November 1993 (age 32)	(Kazakhstan Football Federation) Vostok
16	DF	Rafkat Aslan	2 February 1994 (age 32)	(Kazakhstan Football Federation) Bayterek
17	MF	Elvin Allayarov	21 February 1993 (age 33)	(Kazakhstan Football Federation) Irtysh Pavlodar
18	GK	Stanislav Pavlov	30 May 1994 (age 31)	(Kazakhstan Football Federation) Aktobe
20	FW	Maksim Filchakov	28 December 1993 (age 32)	(Kazakhstan Football Federation) Ordabasy
21	MF	Kasymkhan Talasbaev	27 February 1993 (age 33)	(Kazakhstan Football Federation) Kairat
23	MF	Islambek Kuat	12 January 1993 (age 33)	(Kazakhstan Football Federation) Astana
