= 2015 Commonwealth of Independent States Cup =

CIS Cup, Кубок Содружества 2015

Tournament details
- Host country: Russia
- Dates: 16–25 January 2015
- Teams: 12
- Venue: 1 (in 1 host city)

Final positions
- Champions: South Africa (1st title)
- Runners-up: Finland

Tournament statistics
- Matches played: 34
- Goals scored: 85 (2.5 per match)
- Top scorer(s): (Russia) Alexey Yevseyev (5 goals)

2015 Commonwealth of Independent States Cup was the 23rd annual Commonwealth of Independent States Cup since its establishment in 1993. It was hosted in Saint Petersburg, Russia between 16 and 25 January 2015.

Saint Petersburg hosted the event for the sixth time, with all matches being held in a single venue (Saint Petersburg Sports and Concert Complex). All participating nations were represented by their youth (U20/U21) national teams.

== Format ==
- Group stage

Twelve teams were divided into three groups of four. The top two of each group qualified automatically for a play-off along with the two best third placed teams. The other third placed team along with the three bottom participants out of each group proceed to the play-off which would place its participants 9th through 12th places.

- Playoffs

The winners of the quarter-finals advanced further into semi-finals, while the other four less fortunate entered play-off for the fifth place. Next the winners of the semi-finals advanced to the final, while the other two participants played for the third place. Simultaneously the winners of the play-off for the fifth place continued to the fifth place match, while the other two played for the seventh place.

== Participants ==
The following 12 teams, shown with age of youth national team, took part in the tournament:

| Team | Coach | Notes | Participation |
|---|---|---|---|
| Russia U21 | (Russia) Nikolai Pisarev | Host | 13th |
| Belarus U21 | (Belarus) Igor Kovalevich | | 4th |
| Lithuania U21 | (Lithuania) Arminas Narbekovas | | 4th |
| Latvia U21 | (Latvia) Dainis Kazakevičs | | 4th |
| Estonia U21 | (Estonia) Martin Reim | | 4th |
| Moldova U21 | (Moldova) Igor Ursachi | | 4th |
| Kazakhstan U21 | (Lithuania) Saulius Širmelis | | 4th |
| Tajikistan U20 | (Tajikistan) Alisher Tukhtaev | | 4th |
| Turkmenistan U20 | (Turkmenistan) Ahmet Agamyradow | | 3rd |
| Kyrgyzstan U20 | (Kyrgyzstan) Mirlan Eshenov | | 4th |
| Finland U21 | (Finland) Tommi Kautonen | | 1st |
| South Africa U20 | (South Africa) David Notoane | | 1st |

== Group stage ==
=== Group A ===
| Team | Pld | W | D | L | GF | GA | GD | Pts |
|---|---|---|---|---|---|---|---|---|
| Belarus | 3 | 3 | 0 | 0 | 6 | 0 | +6 | 9 |
| Turkmenistan | 3 | 1 | 1 | 1 | 4 | 3 | +1 | 4 |
| Finland | 3 | 1 | 1 | 1 | 3 | 3 | 0 | 4 |
| Estonia | 3 | 0 | 0 | 3 | 2 | 9 | −7 | 0 |

==== Results ====
All subsequent times UTC+3

16 January 2015
14:15

| Estonia | 1–2 | Finland |
|---|---|---|
| Sappinen 51' | Report | Hatakka 54', 90' |

SKK Peterburgsky, Saint Petersburg
Attendance: 300
Referee: Ivan Saraev (Russia)
16 January 2015
16:30

| Belarus | 1–0 | Turkmenistan |
|---|---|---|
| Teslyuk 54' | Report |

SKK Peterburgsky, Saint Petersburg
Attendance: 500
Referee: German Kravchenko (Russia)

17 January 2015
16:30

| Finland | 1–1 | Turkmenistan |
|---|---|---|
| Aaltonen 50' | Report | Annaýew 7' |

SKK Peterburgsky, Saint Petersburg
Attendance: 300
Referee: Vladimir Seldyakov (Russia)
17 January 2015
19:00

| Estonia | 0–4 | Belarus |
|---|---|---|
| | Report | Yanchenko 4', 14'; Lebedzew 52', 81' |

SKK Peterburgsky, Saint Petersburg
Attendance: 300
Referee: Vasili Kazartsev (Russia)

19 January 2015
12:00

| Belarus | 1–0 | Finland |
|---|---|---|
| Yablonskiy 34' | Report |

SKK Peterburgsky, Saint Petersburg
Attendance: 300
Referee: Yury Aponasenko (Russia)
19 January 2015
14:15

| Turkmenistan | 3–1 | Estonia |
|---|---|---|
| Nurmyradow 34', 52'; Annagulyyew 67' | Report | Saarts 45' |

SKK Peterburgsky, Saint Petersburg
Attendance: 300
Referee: Roman Galimov (Russia)

=== Group B ===
| Team | Pld | W | D | L | GF | GA | GD | Pts |
|---|---|---|---|---|---|---|---|---|
| Kyrgyzstan | 3 | 1 | 2 | 0 | 4 | 3 | +1 | 5 |
| Russia | 3 | 1 | 1 | 1 | 4 | 4 | 0 | 4 |
| Moldova | 3 | 0 | 3 | 0 | 4 | 4 | 0 | 3 |
| Latvia | 3 | 0 | 2 | 1 | 2 | 3 | −1 | 2 |

==== Results ====
All subsequent times UTC+3

16 January 2015
12:00

| Moldova | 1–1 | Kyrgyzstan |
|---|---|---|
| Spătaru 71' | Report | Sagynbaev 81' |

SKK Peterburgsky, Saint Petersburg
Attendance: 300
Referee: Nikolay Voloshin (Russia)
16 January 2015
19:00

| Russia | 1–0 | Latvia |
|---|---|---|
| Kozlov 41' | Report |

SKK Peterburgsky, Saint Petersburg
Attendance: 3,200
Referee: Artem Chistyakov (Russia)

18 January 2015
12:00

| Latvia | 1–1 | Kyrgyzstan |
|---|---|---|
| Tīdenbergs 56' | Report | Kozubaev 82' |

SKK Peterburgsky, Saint Petersburg
Attendance: 300
Referee: Anton Anopa (Russia)
18 January 2015
19:00

| Russia | 2–2 | Moldova |
|---|---|---|
| Yevseyev 49' (pen.), 90' | Report | Roșca 9'; Rogac 39' |

SKK Peterburgsky, Saint Petersburg
Attendance: 3,500
Referee: Aleksey Sukhoy (Russia)

19 January 2015
16:30

| Moldova | 1–1 | Latvia |
|---|---|---|
| Bejan 82' | Report | Tīdenbergs 49' |

SKK Peterburgsky, Saint Petersburg
Attendance: 300
Referee: Oleg Sokolov (Russia)
18 January 2015
19:00

| Kyrgyzstan | 2–1 | Russia |
|---|---|---|
| Duyshobekov 45'; Umarov 50' (pen.) | Report | Yevseyev 83' (pen.) |

SKK Peterburgsky, Saint Petersburg
Attendance: 1,000
Referee: German Kravchenko (Russia)

=== Group C ===
| Team | Pld | W | D | L | GF | GA | GD | Pts |
|---|---|---|---|---|---|---|---|---|
| Tajikistan | 3 | 2 | 0 | 1 | 4 | 4 | 0 | 6 |
| South Africa | 3 | 1 | 2 | 0 | 4 | 2 | +2 | 5 |
| Kazakhstan | 3 | 1 | 1 | 1 | 1 | 1 | 0 | 4 |
| Lithuania | 3 | 0 | 1 | 2 | 2 | 4 | −2 | 1 |

==== Results ====
All subsequent times UTC+3

17 January 2015
12:00

| South Africa | 1–1 | Lithuania |
|---|---|---|
| Liphoko 9' | Report | Krušnauskas 31' |

SKK Peterburgsky, Saint Petersburg
Attendance: 300
Referee: Stanislav Vasilyev (Russia)
17 January 2015
14:15

| Tajikistan | 1–0 | Kazakhstan |
|---|---|---|
| Ergashev 51' | Report |

SKK Peterburgsky, Saint Petersburg
Attendance: 500
Referee: Evgeny Turbin (Russia)

18 January 2015
14:15

| Kazakhstan | 1–0 | Lithuania |
|---|---|---|
| Aimbetov 74' | Report |

SKK Peterburgsky, Saint Petersburg
Attendance: 300
Referee: Andrey Fisenko (Russia)
18 January 2015
16:30

| Tajikistan | 1–3 | South Africa |
|---|---|---|
| Rakhmonov 72' (pen.) | Report | Madisha 26'; Monamodi 38'; Domingo 50' |

SKK Peterburgsky, Saint Petersburg
Attendance: 1,000
Referee: Roman Chernov (Russia)

20 January 2015
12:00

| South Africa | 0–0 | Kazakhstan |
|---|---|---|
| | Report |

SKK Peterburgsky, Saint Petersburg
Attendance: 300
Referee: Vasili Kazartsev (Russia)
20 January 2015
14:15

| Lithuania | 1–2 | Tajikistan |
|---|---|---|
| Malinauskas 4' | Report | Ergashev 78'; Rakhmonov 86' |

SKK Peterburgsky, Saint Petersburg
Attendance: 300
Referee: Vladimir Seldyakov (Russia)

== Consolation round ==
=== Bracket ===
9th – 12th place (22 Jan)
Estonia | 2
Moldova | 3
Latvia | 2
Lithuania | 0

9th place match (24 Jan)
Moldova (p) | 1
Latvia | 1
11th place match (24 Jan)
Estonia | 2
Lithuania | 1

=== Places 9 to 12 ===
22 January 2015
16:30

| Estonia | 2–3 | Moldova |
|---|---|---|
| Gussev 77'; Kirss 31' | Report | Lacusta 1'; Ciofu 44' (pen.); Ursu 63' |

SKK Peterburgsky, Saint Petersburg
Attendance: 300
Referee: Yury Aponasenko (Russia)
22 January 2015
19:00

| Latvia | 2–0 | Lithuania |
|---|---|---|
| Šadčins 85'; Ivanovs 90' | Report |

SKK Peterburgsky, Saint Petersburg
Attendance: 300
Referee: Aleksey Sukhoy (Russia)

=== Eleventh place match ===
24 January 2015
16:30

| Estonia | 2–1 | Lithuania |
|---|---|---|
| Sappinen 55'; Gussev 77' | Report | Malinauskas 36' |

SKK Peterburgsky, Saint Petersburg
Attendance: 300
Referee: Anton Anopa (Russia)

=== Ninth place match ===
24 January 2015
19:00

| Moldova | 1–1 | Latvia |
|---|---|---|
| Semirov 30' | Report | Flaksis 75' (pen.) |
Penalties
| Bîrdan (penalty scored); Ciofu (penalty scored); Macrițchii (penalty scored); Ursu (penalty scored); Rozgoniuc (penalty scored); Paireli (penalty scored) | 6–5 | (penalty scored) Svārups; (penalty scored) Vītolnieks; (penalty scored) Flaksis; (penalty scored) Kiriļins; (penalty scored) Gutkovskis; (penalty missed) Bērenfelds |

SKK Peterburgsky, Saint Petersburg
Attendance: 300
Referee: Ivan Saraev (Russia)

== Final stages ==
=== Bracket ===
5th place match (25 Jan)
Russia | 3
Kyrgyzstan | 1
7th place match (25 Jan)
Kazakhstan | 2
Tajikistan | 0

5th – 8th place (23 Jan)
Kazakhstan | 0
Russia | 3
Tajikistan | 1
Kyrgyzstan | 3

Quarterfinals (21 Jan)
Belarus (p) | 1
Kazakhstan | 1
Russia | 0
South Africa | 2
Tajikistan | 0
Turkmenistan | 2
Kyrgyzstan | 0
Finland | 1

Semifinals (23 Jan)
Belarus | 1
South Africa (p) | 1
Turkmenistan | 0
Finland | 4

Final (25 Jan)
South Africa | 2
Finland | 1
3rd place match (25 Jan)
Belarus | 4
Turkmenistan | 0

=== Quarter-finals ===
21 January 2015
12:00

| Kyrgyzstan | 0–1 | Finland |
|---|---|---|
| | Report | Rahimi 79' |

SKK Peterburgsky, Saint Petersburg
Attendance: 300
Referee: Roman Chernov (Russia)
21 January 2015
14:15

| Belarus | 1–1 | Kazakhstan |
|---|---|---|
| Yarotsky 78' | Report | Jalilov 64' |
Penalties
| Poznyak (penalty scored); Zaleski (penalty scored); Klimovich (penalty missed); Zolotov (penalty missed); Ignatenko (penalty scored) | 3–1 | (penalty scored) Sariev; (penalty missed) Tuliyev; (penalty missed) Shaikhov; (penalty missed) Aimbetov |

SKK Peterburgsky, Saint Petersburg
Attendance: 350
Referee: Nikolay Voloshin (Russia)
21 January 2015
16:30

| Tajikistan | 0–2 | Turkmenistan |
|---|---|---|
| | Report | Annaýew 45'; Annagulyyew 86' |

SKK Peterburgsky, Saint Petersburg
Attendance: 1,000
Referee: Andrey Fisenko (Russia)
21 January 2015
19:00

| Russia | 0–2 | South Africa |
|---|---|---|
| | Report | Maraisane 50'; Luthuli 55' |

SKK Peterburgsky, Saint Petersburg
Attendance: 2,500
Referee: Evgeny Turbin (Russia)

=== Places 5 to 8 ===
23 January 2015
12:00

| Kazakhstan | 0–3 | Russia |
|---|---|---|
| | Report | Yevseyev 48' (pen.), 81' (pen.); Guliyev 72' |

SKK Peterburgsky, Saint Petersburg
Attendance: 300
Referee: Roman Galimov (Russia)
23 January 2015
14:15

| Tajikistan | 1–3 | Kyrgyzstan |
|---|---|---|
| Rakhmonov 90' | Report | Kozubaev 70'; Akhmataliev 18'; Bokoleev 54' |

SKK Peterburgsky, Saint Petersburg
Attendance: 300
Referee: Stanislav Vasilyev (Russia)

=== Semi-finals ===
23 January 2015
16:30

| Belarus | 1–1 | South Africa |
|---|---|---|
| Klimovich 74' | Report | Madisha 90' (pen.) |
Penalties
| Poznyak (penalty missed); Yablonskiy (penalty scored); Zaleski (penalty scored); Chernyshov (penalty scored); Karpovich (penalty missed) | 3–4 | (penalty scored) Madisha; (penalty scored) Maraisane; (penalty missed) Seriba; (penalty scored) Domingo; (penalty scored) Modiba |

SKK Peterburgsky, Saint Petersburg
Attendance: 500
Referee: Vladimir Seldyakov (Russia)
23 January 2015
19:00

| Turkmenistan | 0–4 | Finland |
|---|---|---|
| | Report | Hatakka 30', 65'; Hovi 54'; Yaghoubi 80' (pen.) |

SKK Peterburgsky, Saint Petersburg
Attendance: 400
Referee: Vasili Kazartsev (Russia)

=== Seventh place match ===
25 January 2015
11:00

| Kazakhstan | 2–0 | Tajikistan |
|---|---|---|
| Sariev 23', 85' | Report |

SKK Peterburgsky, Saint Petersburg
Attendance: 300
Referee: Oleg Sokolov (Russia)

=== Fifth place match ===
25 January 2015
14:15

| Russia | 3–1 | Kyrgyzstan |
|---|---|---|
| Kurzenyov 19', 72'; Kirisov 42' | Report | Umarov 70' |

SKK Peterburgsky, Saint Petersburg
Attendance: 550
Referee: Andrey Fisenko (Russia)

=== Third place match ===
25 January 2015
16:30

| Belarus | 4–0 | Turkmenistan |
|---|---|---|
| Milevsky 30'; Yablonskiy 47' (pen.); Yevdokimov 64'; Yarotsky 82' | Report |

SKK Peterburgsky, Saint Petersburg
Attendance: 1,000
Referee: Roman Chernov (Russia)

=== Final ===
25 January 2015
19:00

| South Africa | 2–1 | Finland |
|---|---|---|
| Madisha 15'; Maraisane 78' | Report | Tamminen 38' |

SKK Peterburgsky, Saint Petersburg
Attendance: 2,500
Referee: Aleksey Sukhoy (Russia)

== Final standing ==
| Rank | Team |
|---|---|
| 1st place, gold medalist(s) | South Africa |
| 2nd place, silver medalist(s) | Finland |
| 3rd place, bronze medalist(s) | Belarus |
| 4 | Turkmenistan |
| 5 | Russia |
| 6 | Kyrgyzstan |
| 7 | Kazakhstan |
| 8 | Tajikistan |
| 9 | Moldova |
| 10 | Latvia |
| 11 | Estonia |
| 12 | Lithuania |

== Top scorers ==
| Rank | Player | Team | Goals |
|---|---|---|---|
| 1 | (Russia) Alexey Yevseyev | Russia | 5 |
| 2 | (Finland) Dani Hatakka | Finland | 4 |
| 3 | (South Africa) Motjeka Madisha | South Africa | 3 |
| 3 | (Tajikistan) Abdurasul Rakhmonov | Tajikistan | 3 |
