= 2014 Commonwealth of Independent States Cup =

CIS Cup, Кубок Содружества 2014

Tournament details
- Host country: Russia
- Dates: 24 January – 2 February 2014
- Teams: 12
- Venue: 1 (in 1 host city)

Final positions
- Champions: Ukraine (1st title)
- Runners-up: Russia

Tournament statistics
- Matches played: 34
- Goals scored: 95 (2.79 per match)
- Top scorer(s): (Russia) Ruslan Bolov (Kazakhstan) Roman Murtazayev (Tajikistan) Abdurasul Rakhmonov (5 goals)

2014 Commonwealth of Independent States Cup was the 22nd annual Commonwealth of Independent States Cup since its establishment in 1993. It was hosted in Saint Petersburg, Russia between 24 January and 2 February 2014.

Saint Petersburg hosted the event for the fifth time, with all matches being held in a single venue (Saint Petersburg Sports and Concert Complex). All participating nations were represented by their youth (U20/U21) national teams.

== Format ==
- Group stage

Twelve teams were divided into three groups of four. The top two of each group qualified automatically for a play-off along with the two best third placed teams. The other third placed team along with the three bottom participants out of each group proceed to the play-off which would place its participants 9th through 12th places.

- Playoffs

The winners of the quarter-finals advanced further into semi-finals, while the other four less fortunate entered play-off for the fifth place. Next the winners of the semi-finals advanced to the final, while the other two participants played for the third place. Simultaneously the winners of the play-off for the fifth place continued to the fifth place match, while the other two played for the seventh place.

== Participants ==
The following 12 teams, shown with age of youth national team, took part in the tournament:

Team	Coach	Notes	Participation
Russia U21	(Russia) Nikolai Pisarev	Host	12th
Ukraine U21	(Ukraine) Serhiy Kovalets		3rd
Belarus U21	(Belarus) Igor Kovalevich		3rd
Lithuania U21	(Lithuania) Arminas Narbekovas		3rd
Latvia U21	(Netherlands) Anton Joore		3rd
Estonia U21	(Estonia) Martin Reim		3rd
Moldova U21	(Moldova) Alexandru Curteian		3rd
Kazakhstan U21	(Lithuania) Saulius Širmelis		3rd
Tajikistan U20	(Tajikistan) Makhmadjon Khabibulloev		3rd
Kyrgyzstan U20	(Kyrgyzstan) Anarbek Ormombekov		3rd
Moscow U21	(Russia) Vladimir Shcherbak		1st
Saint Petersburg U21	(Russia) Boris Rappoport		1st

== Group stage ==
=== Group A ===
Team	Pld	W	D	L	GF	GA	GD	Pts
Ukraine	3	3	0	0	8	1	+7	9
Estonia	3	1	1	1	5	4	+1	4
Tajikistan	3	0	2	1	5	8	−3	2
Kyrgyzstan	3	0	1	2	2	7	−5	1

==== Results ====
All subsequent times UTC+3

24 January 2014
12:00

Estonia	2 – 2	Tajikistan
Kirss 28'; Vaštšuk 73'	Report	Rakhmatov 48'; Rakhmonov 90+1'

SKK Peterburgsky, Saint Petersburg
Attendance: 200
Referee: Roman Chernov (Russia)
24 January 2014
14:15

Ukraine	2 – 0	Kyrgyzstan
Malinovskyi 26'; Kalitvintsev 31'	Report

SKK Peterburgsky, Saint Petersburg
Attendance: 200
Referee: Vladimir Moskalyov (Russia)

25 January 2014
16:30

Ukraine	2 – 0	Estonia
Totovytskyi 8' (pen.); Akulinin 89' (pen.)	Report

SKK Peterburgsky, Saint Petersburg
Attendance: 250
Referee: Vasili Miroshnichenko (Russia)
25 January 2014
19:00

Kyrgyzstan	2 – 2	Tajikistan
Musabekov 76'; Sagynbaev 90+3'	Report	Rakhmonov 10', 69'

SKK Peterburgsky, Saint Petersburg
Attendance: 500
Referee: Sergey Smirnov (Russia)

27 January 2014
12:00

Estonia	3 – 0	Kyrgyzstan
Lepistu 47'; Gussev 57'; Kauber 78'	Report

SKK Peterburgsky, Saint Petersburg
Attendance: 200
Referee: Sergei Kulikov (Russia)
27 January 2014
14:15

Tajikistan	1 – 4	Ukraine
Rakhmonov 89'	Report	Akulinin 57'; Yurchenko 59'; Totovytskyi 79'; Kalitvintsev 85'

SKK Peterburgsky, Saint Petersburg
Attendance: 300
Referee: Denis Shpilev (Russia)

=== Group B ===
Team	Pld	W	D	L	GF	GA	GD	Pts
Russia	3	3	0	0	10	1	+9	9
Saint Petersburg	3	2	0	1	6	4	+2	6
Lithuania	3	1	0	2	1	5	−4	3
Moldova	3	0	0	3	0	7	−7	0

==== Results ====
All subsequent times UTC+3

24 January 2014
16:30

Lithuania	0 – 2	Saint Petersburg
	Report	Umarov 14'; Bogayev 90+1'

SKK Peterburgsky, Saint Petersburg
Attendance: 500
Referee: Denis Shpilev (Russia)
24 January 2014
19:00

Russia	3 – 0	Moldova
Bolov 6'; Zubarev 54'; Mogilevets 66'	Report

SKK Peterburgsky, Saint Petersburg
Attendance: 2,300
Referee: Sergei Kulikov (Russia)

26 January 2014
12:00

Moldova	0 – 3	Saint Petersburg
	Report	Panfilov 16', 75'; Yefimov 63'

SKK Peterburgsky, Saint Petersburg
Attendance: 300
Referee: Anton Anopa (Russia)
26 January 2014
19:00

Lithuania	0 – 3	Russia
	Report	Bolov 25' (pen.); Zubarev 51'; Sharipov 85'

SKK Peterburgsky, Saint Petersburg
Attendance: 3,500
Referee: German Kravchenko (Russia)

27 January 2014
16:30

Lithuania	1 – 0	Moldova
Stankevičius 27' (pen.)	Report

SKK Peterburgsky, Saint Petersburg
Attendance: 500
Referee: Roman Chernov (Russia)
27 January 2014
19:00

Russia	4 – 1	Saint Petersburg
Zubarev 9'; Chkhapeliya 27'; Bolov 67' (pen.), 69'	Report	Panfilov 56'

SKK Peterburgsky, Saint Petersburg
Attendance: 2350
Referee: Vladimir Moskalyov (Russia)

=== Group C ===
Team	Pld	W	D	L	GF	GA	GD	Pts
Latvia	3	2	1	0	2	0	+2	7
Belarus	3	1	1	1	6	4	+2	4
Kazakhstan	3	1	1	1	3	4	−1	4
Moscow	3	0	1	2	2	5	−3	1

==== Results ====
All subsequent times UTC+3

25 January 2014
12:00

Latvia	1 – 0	Moscow
Loginovs 37'	Report

SKK Peterburgsky, Saint Petersburg
Attendance: 200
Referee: Vitaly Rushakov (Russia)
25 January 2014
14:15

Belarus	4 – 1	Kazakhstan
Shestilovsky 9'; Savitski 12'; Lebedzew 22'; Shramchenko 37'	Report	Islamkhan 57'

SKK Peterburgsky, Saint Petersburg
Attendance: 200
Referee: Kirill Levnikov (Russia)

26 January 2014
14:15

Belarus	0 – 1	Latvia
	Report	Klimaševičs 56'

SKK Peterburgsky, Saint Petersburg
Attendance: 250
Referee: Aleksey Sukhoy (Russia)
26 January 2014
16:30

Kazakhstan	2 – 0	Moscow
Zhangylyshbay 11'; Murtazayev 61'	Report

SKK Peterburgsky, Saint Petersburg
Attendance: 400
Referee: Roman Galimov (Russia)

28 January 2014
12:00

Latvia	0 – 0	Kazakhstan
	Report

SKK Peterburgsky, Saint Petersburg
Attendance: 200
Referee: Vasili Miroshnichenko (Russia)
28 January 2014
14:15

Belarus	2 – 2	Moscow
Klopotskiy 9', 45' (pen.)	Report	Morgunov 83'; Zayerko 90'

SKK Peterburgsky, Saint Petersburg
Attendance: 200
Referee: Sergey Smirnov (Russia)

== Consolation round ==
=== Bracket ===
9th – 12th place (30 Jan)
Kyrgyzstan	0
Moscow	5
Moldova	2
Tajikistan	1

9th place match (1 Feb)
Moscow	2
Moldova	1
11th place match (1 Feb)
Kyrgyzstan	1
Tajikistan (p)	1

=== Places 9 to 12 ===
30 January 2014
16:30

Kyrgyzstan	0 – 5	Moscow
	Report	Zayerko 2'; Sinyavsky 8', 15', 29'; Sutormin 40'

SKK Peterburgsky, Saint Petersburg
Attendance: 200
Referee: Denis Shpilev (Russia)
30 January 2014
19:00

Moldova	2 – 1	Tajikistan
Bogdan 6'; Dima 55'	Report	Avram 86' (o.g.)

SKK Peterburgsky, Saint Petersburg
Attendance: 300
Referee: Roman Galimov (Russia)

=== Eleventh place match ===
1 February 2014
16:30

Kyrgyzstan	1 – 1	Tajikistan
Akhmataliev 22'	Report	Rakhmonov 50' (pen.)
Penalties
Musabekov (penalty scored); Zhyrgalbek (penalty missed); Umarov (penalty scored); Kolbaev (penalty missed)	2–4	(penalty scored) Rakhmonov; (penalty scored) Juraboev; (penalty scored) Rakhmatov; (penalty scored) Tursunov

SKK Peterburgsky, Saint Petersburg
Attendance: 200
Referee: Roman Chernov (Russia)

=== Ninth place match ===
1 February 2014
19:00

Moscow	2 – 1	Moldova
Polyakov 5'; Kurzenyov 90' (pen.)	Report	Tiron 58'

SKK Peterburgsky, Saint Petersburg
Attendance: 200
Referee: Vasili Miroshnichenko (Russia)

== Final stages ==
=== Bracket ===
5th place match (2 Feb)
Saint Petersburg	0
Kazakhstan	3
7th place match (2 Feb)
Lithuania	1
Latvia	0

5th – 8th place (31 Jan)
Lithuania	0
Saint Petersburg (p)	0
Latvia	1
Kazakhstan	3

Quarterfinals (29 Jan)
Ukraine	4
Lithuania	1
Saint Petersburg	0
Belarus	3
Latvia	0
Estonia	2
Russia	3
Kazakhstan	1

Semifinals (31 Jan)
Ukraine	1
Belarus	0
Estonia	0
Russia	3

Final (2 Feb)
Ukraine	4
Russia	0
3rd place match (2 Feb)
Belarus	2
Estonia	0

=== Quarter-finals ===
29 January 2014
12:00

Ukraine	4 – 1	Lithuania
Pryndeta 25'; Yurchenko 28'; Totovytskyi 31'; Akulinin 47'	Report	Salamanavičius 10'

SKK Peterburgsky, Saint Petersburg
Attendance: 200
Referee: Aleksey Sukhoy (Russia)
29 January 2014
14:15

Latvia	0 – 2	Estonia
	Report	Gussev 72'; Vaštšuk 82'

SKK Peterburgsky, Saint Petersburg
Attendance: 200
Referee: Kirill Levnikov (Russia)
29 January 2014
16:30

Saint Petersburg	0 – 3	Belarus
	Report	Shramchenko 29', 57'; Yablonskiy 47'

SKK Peterburgsky, Saint Petersburg
Attendance: 500
Referee: German Kravchenko (Russia)
29 January 2014
19:00

Russia	3 – 1	Kazakhstan
Bolov 9'; Chkhapeliya 63'; Manzon 74'	Report	Murtazayev 32'

SKK Peterburgsky, Saint Petersburg
Attendance: 850
Referee: Vitaly Rushakov (Russia)

=== Places 5 to 8 ===
31 January 2014
12:00

Lithuania	0 – 0	Saint Petersburg
	Report
Penalties
Girdvainis (penalty scored); Baranauskas (penalty scored); Salamanavičius (penalty scored); Gedminas (penalty scored); Skripkinas (penalty missed)	4–5	(penalty scored) Panfilov; (penalty scored) A.Ivanov; (penalty scored) Deyneko; (penalty scored) Zakarlyuka; (penalty scored) Zolotarenko

SKK Peterburgsky, Saint Petersburg
Attendance: 200
Referee: Sergei Kulikov (Russia)
31 January 2014
14:15

Latvia	1 – 3	Kazakhstan
Ikaunieks 34'	Report	Pasichnik 14'; Murtazayev 30', 90'

SKK Peterburgsky, Saint Petersburg
Attendance: 300
Referee: Sergey Smirnov (Russia)

=== Semi-finals ===
31 January 2014
16:30

Ukraine	1 – 0	Belarus
Shestilovsky 72' (o.g.)	Report

SKK Peterburgsky, Saint Petersburg
Attendance: 700
Referee: Vladimir Moskalyov (Russia)
31 January 2014
19:00

Estonia	0 – 3	Russia
	Report	Zemskov 14', 38'; Tsveiba 57'

SKK Peterburgsky, Saint Petersburg
Attendance: 1,000
Referee: German Kravchenko (Russia)

=== Seventh place match ===
2 February 2014
12:00

Lithuania	1 – 0	Latvia
Salamanavičius 63'	Report

SKK Peterburgsky, Saint Petersburg
Attendance: 200
Referee: Roman Galimov (Russia)

=== Fifth place match ===
2 February 2014
14:15

Saint Petersburg	0 – 3	Kazakhstan
	Report	Filchakov 27', 31'; Murtazayev 86'

SKK Peterburgsky, Saint Petersburg
Attendance: 400
Referee: Vladimir Moskalyov (Russia)

=== Third place match ===
2 February 2014
16:30

Belarus	2 – 0	Estonia
Klopotskiy 60' (pen.); Nazarenko 87'	Report

SKK Peterburgsky, Saint Petersburg
Attendance: 600
Referee: Aleksey Sukhoy (Russia)

=== Final ===
2 February 2014
19:00

Ukraine	4 – 0	Russia
Puchkovskyi 4'; Vakulenko 16'; Memeshev 47'; Totovytskyi 90'	Report

SKK Peterburgsky, Saint Petersburg
Attendance: 3,000
Referee: Vitaly Rushakov (Russia)

== Final standing ==
Rank	Team
1st place, gold medalist(s)	Ukraine
2nd place, silver medalist(s)	Russia
3rd place, bronze medalist(s)	Belarus
4	Estonia
5	Kazakhstan
6	Saint Petersburg
7	Lithuania
8	Latvia
9	Moscow
10	Moldova
11	Tajikistan
12	Kyrgyzstan

== Top scorers ==
Rank	Player	Team	Goals
1	(Russia) Ruslan Bolov	Russia	5
1	(Kazakhstan) Roman Murtazayev	Kazakhstan	5
1	(Tajikistan) Abdurasul Rakhmonov	Tajikistan	5
4	(Ukraine) Andriy Totovytskyi	Ukraine	4
5	(Ukraine) Leonid Akulinin	Ukraine	3
5	(Russia) Vladimir Zubarev	Russia	3
5	(Belarus) Yevgeniy Klopotskiy	Belarus	3
5	(Belarus) Anton Shramchenko	Belarus	3
5	(Russia) Aleksei Panfilov	Saint Petersburg	3
5	(Russia) Semyon Sinyavsky	Moscow	3
