= Matvei =

Matvei or Matvey (Матвей) is the Russian language variation of Matthew. Notable people with the name include:

- Matvey Blanter (1903–1990), Russian composer of popular and film music
- Matvei Bronstein (1906–1938), Soviet theoretical physicist
- Matvey Frantskevich (born 1995), Belarusian footballer
- Matvei Gedenshtrom (c. 1780–1845), Russian explorer of the northern parts of Siberia
- Matvei Golovinski (1865–1920), Russian-French writer, journalist, and Political activist
- Matvei Gridin (born 2006), Russian ice hockey player
- Matvey Gusev (1826–1866), Russian astronomer
- Matvey Kuzmin (1858–1942), Russian peasant who was killed in World War II
- Matvey Levenstein (born 1960), artist born in the former U.S.S.R, lives and works in NYC
- Matvey Mamykin (born 1994), Russian cyclist
- Matvey Manizer (1891–1966), Russian sculptor
- Matvei Michkov (born 2004), Russian ice hockey player
- Matvei Muranov (1873–1959), Ukrainian-born Bolshevik revolutionary
- Matvey Muravyev (1784–1836), Russian explorer
- Matvei Petrov (born 1990), Russian male artistic gymnast
- Matvey Safonov (born 1999), Russian footballer
- Matvei Zakharov (1898–1972), Marshal of the Soviet Union

== See also ==
- Matthew (given name)
