= Vladislav Semyonov =

Russian footballer

Personal information
- Full name: Vladislav Vladimirovich Semyonov
- Date of birth: 30 April 1993 (age 33)
- Place of birth: Moscow, Russia
- Height: 1.83 m (6 ft 0 in)
- Positions: Defender; midfielder

Team information
- Current team: FC Yevpatoriya

Senior career*
Years	Team	Apps	(Gls)
2013–2016	FC Strogino Moscow	53	(1)
2016–2017	PFC Spartak Nalchik	30	(0)
2018	FC Veles Moscow	6	(0)
2019–	FC Yevpatoriya		
- * Club domestic league appearances and goals as of 10 November 2018

Vladislav Vladimirovich Semyonov (Russian: Владислав Владимирович Семёнов; born 30 April 1993) is a Russian football player. He plays for FC Yevpatoriya.

== Club career ==
He made his debut in the Russian Second Division for FC Strogino Moscow on 15 July 2013 in a game against FC Torpedo Vladimir.

He made his Russian Football National League debut for PFC Spartak Nalchik on 11 July 2016 in a game against FC Kuban Krasnodar.
