= Aleksandr Shumeyko =

Soviet and Kyrgyzstani football manager

Personal information
- Full name: Aleksandr Ivanovich Shumeyko
- Place of birth: USSR
- Date of death: 16 May 2014
- Place of death: Bishkek, Kyrgyzstan

Managerial career
- Years: Team
- 199x–1997: Alga-PVO Bishkek
- 1998–1999: SKA-PVO Bishkek
- Kyrgyzstan U-21

Aleksandr Ivanovich Shumeyko (Russian: Александр Иванович Шумейко; born in USSR, died 16 May 2014 in Bishkek, Kyrgyzstan) was a Soviet and Kyrgyzstani professional football manager.

== Career ==
Aleksandr Shumeyko during his long football life has worked as coach of Kyrgyzstan national under-21 football team, led the Alga-PVO Bishkek and SKA-PVO Bishkek and many others' football clubs. In recent years, Shumeyko worked as an inspector at the Top League matches, and he was Deputy Chairman of the Disciplinary Committee FFKR.
