= Sirotin =

Sirotin, feminine: Sirotina, is a Russian surname. Notable people with the surname include:

- Daria Sirotina, Russian snooker and pool player
- Pavel Sirotin

== See also ==
- Sirotkin
