= Aleksandr Radionov =

Russian footballer

Personal information
- Full name: Aleksandr Andreyevich Radionov
- Date of birth: 30 April 1993 (age 33)
- Height: 1.86 m (6 ft 1 in)
- Position: Goalkeeper

Senior career*
Years	Team	Apps	(Gls)
2013–2015	FC Strogino Moscow	25	(0)
2015	FC Dnepr Smolensk	3	(0)
2016–2023	FC Chertanovo Moscow	98	(1)
2018–2019	→ FC Chertanovo-2 Moscow	3	(0)
- * Club domestic league appearances and goals

Aleksandr Andreyevich Radionov (Russian: Александр Андреевич Радионов; born 30 April 1993) is a Russian former football player.

== Club career ==
He made his debut in the Russian Professional Football League for FC Strogino Moscow on 4 August 2013 in a game against FC Sever Murmansk.

He made his Russian Football National League debut for FC Chertanovo Moscow on 30 September 2018 in a game against PFC Sochi.
