= Ermek Kenzhebayev =

Kyrgyz footballer

Personal information
- Full name: Ermek Zhigitbekovich Kenzhebayev
- Date of birth: 3 April 2003 (age 23)
- Place of birth: Bishkek, Kyrgyzstan
- Height: 1.75 m (5 ft 9 in)
- Position: Midfielder

Team information
- Current team: Alga Bishkek
- Number: 21

Youth career
- 2015–2020: Dordoi Bishkek

Senior career*
Years	Team	Apps	(Gls)
2020–2023	Dordoi Bishkek	4	(0)
2021–2022	→ Ilbirs Bishkek (loan)	43	(5)
2023–2025	Slavia Mozyr	11	(0)
2025	→ Bars Issyk-kul (loan)	12	(0)
2025	→ Alga Bishkek (loan)	13	(0)
2026–	Alga Bishkek	3	(0)

International career^{‡}
2023	Kyrgyzstan U20	6	(1)
2023–	Kyrgyzstan U23	1	(0)
2023–	Kyrgyzstan	9	(0)
- * Club domestic league appearances and goals as of 15 March 2026 ‡ National team caps and goals as of 19 November 2024

Ermek Zhigitbekovich Kenzhebayev (Kyrgyz: Эрмек Жигитбек уулу Кенжебаев; Russian: Эрмек Жигитбекович Кенжебаев; born 3 April 2003) is a Kyrgyz professional footballer.

== Club career ==
In 2016, Kenzhebayev traveled to Milan, Italy, for an under-14 tournament as part of the academy of Dordoi Bishkek of the Kyrgyz Premier League. He made his senior debut for the club on 3 August 2020 against Ilbirs Bishkek. He entered the match as a 77th-minute substitute for Farhat Musabekov. The following year he joined Ilbirs Bishkek on loan from Dordoi. In total, he would go on to make forty three appearances for the club, scoring five goals, during his time there.

In July 2023, it was reported that Kenzhebayev was leaving FC Dordoi Bishkek to join Slavia Mozyr of the Belarusian Premier League on a three-year contract. He had made four total appearances in the Kyrgyz Premier League for Dordoi Bishkek during his tenure with the club. The move to Slavia Mozyr was officially announced on 4 August 2023. On 21 August 2023 he appeared in a friendly against Dynamo Brest and scored to secure the 2–0 victory.

In January 2025, it was announced that Kenzhebayev was loaned to newly-formed Kyrgyz Premier League club Bars Issyk-kul for the 2025 season.

== International career ==
Kenzhebayev represented Kyrgyzstan in 2023 AFC U-20 Asian Cup qualification. He tallied a goal and an assist in a 6–0 victory over Brunei to close out qualifying and advance to the final tournament.
