= 1998 Kyrgyzstan League =

Kyrgyzstan League
- Season: 1998
- Champions: SKA PVO Bishkek

Statistics of Kyrgyzstan League for the 1998 season.

== Overview ==
It was contested by 20 teams, and CAG Dinamo MVD Bishkek won the championship.

== First stage ==
=== Zone A ===
Pos	Team	Pld	W	D	L	GF	GA	GD	Pts
1	SKA PVO Bishkek	14	11	3	0	40	8	+32	36
2	National Guard Bishkek	14	10	2	2	38	9	+29	32
3	CAG Dinamo MVD Bishkek	14	10	2	2	30	12	+18	32
4	Sverdlovsky ROVD SK Bishkek	14	7	2	5	19	17	+2	23
5	KVT Dinamo Kara Balta	14	6	0	8	19	36	−17	18
6	Dinamo Alamedin	14	4	2	8	19	23	−4	14
7	Dinamo Sokuluk	14	1	1	12	7	35	−28	4
8	Dinamo Kant	14	0	2	12	3	35	−32	2

Source: rsssf.com

=== Zone B ===
Pos	Team	Pld	W	D	L	GF	GA	GD	Pts
1	Semetey Kyzyl Kiya	22	18	2	2	65	10	+55	56
2	Dinamo Alay Osh	22	15	4	3	57	18	+39	49
3	Dinamo Ala Buka	22	14	3	5	51	25	+26	45
4	Jalal Abad	22	13	3	6	45	28	+17	42
5	Zhashtyk Ak Altyn Kara-Suu	22	13	3	6	53	32	+21	42
6	Energetik Kara Kul	22	9	6	7	31	31	0	33
7	FK Nookat	22	8	5	9	27	39	−12	29
8	Alay Osh	22	6	3	13	34	52	−18	21
9	Aldiyer Kurshab	22	6	3	13	29	42	−13	21
10	Svetotekhnika Mayli Say	22	4	3	15	27	64	−37	15
11	Bazar Korgon Babur	22	4	1	17	21	59	−38	13
12	Neftchi KRS Kochkor Ata	22	3	3	16	21	61	−40	12

Source: rsssf.com

== Final stage ==
Pos	Team	Pld	W	D	L	GF	GA	GD	Pts
1	CAG Dinamo MVD Bishkek	14	11	3	0	35	8	+27	36
2	SKA PVO Bishkek	14	9	4	1	36	5	+31	31
3	National Guard Bishkek	14	9	1	4	21	11	+10	28
4	Dinamo Alay Osh	14	5	3	6	21	24	−3	18
5	Sverdlovsky ROVD SK Bishkek	14	4	5	5	11	16	−5	17
6	Dinamo Ala Buka	14	3	2	9	8	28	−20	11
7	Semetey Kyzyl Kiya	14	2	2	10	10	24	−14	8
8	Jalal Abad	14	2	2	10	9	35	−26	8

Source: rsssf.com
