= Murat Jumakeyev =

Kyrgyzstani footballer and manager

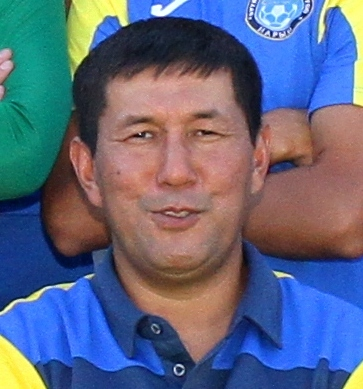

Personal information
- Date of birth: 27 November 1973 (age 52)
- Place of birth: Kyrgyzstan, USSR
- Height: 1.86 m (6 ft 1 in)
- Position: Defender

Senior career*
Years	Team	Apps	(Gls)
1990–1991	FC Dostuk Sokuluk	23	(0)
1992–2002	FC Alga Bishkek	209	(27)
2002	FC Batys Uralsk	8	(0)
2003–2005	SKA-PVO/SKA Shoro Bishkek	>57	(1)
2007	FC Abdish-Ata Kant		(0)

International career
1993–2003	Kyrgyzstan	5	(0)

Managerial career
- 2002–2003: SKA-PVO Bishkek (player & assistant)
- 2003–2005: SKA-PVO/SKA Shoro Bishkek (playing coach)
- 2007–2008: FC Abdish-Ata Kant (playing coach)
- 2008: FC Kant-77
- 2010: FC Alga Bishkek (caretaker)
- 2010–2011: FC Dordoi-94 Bishkek
- 2010–2011: Kyrgyzstan (Olympic)
- 2011–2012: Kyrgyzstan U-21
- 2011–2012: Kyrgyzstan
- 2012–2013: Kyrgyzstan U-21
- 2013–: FC Dordoi Bishkek
- * Club domestic league appearances and goals

Murat Jumakeyev (Russian: Мурат Абдукашевич Джумакеев; born 27 November 1973 in USSR) is a Kyrgyzstani professional football player and manager.

== Career ==
In 1990, he began his professional career for the FC Dostuk Sokuluk. In 1992–2002 he played for the FC Alga Bishkek. Second half of 2002 he spent in Kazakh club FC Batys Uralsk. In 2003, he returned to SKA-PVO Bishkek and after played until the club dissolved.

In 1993, he made his debut for the Kyrgyzstan.

In 2002, he started his coaching career in SKA-PVO Bishkek as playing coach. Later he coached FC Abdish-Ata Kant, FC Kant-77. In 2010 Murat Dzhumakeyev appointed caretaker coach of reactivated FC Alga Bishkek. After he trained the FC Dordoi-94 Bishkek, Kyrgyzstan Olympic national football team and U-21 team. Since April 2011 until September 2012 he was a coach of the Kyrgyzstan national football team. 19 September 2012 Murat Dzhumakeyev headed youth team in football. Currently he is the coach of the FC Dordoi Bishkek.

== Career statistics ==
=== International ===
Kyrgyzstan national team
Year	Apps	Goals
1993	2	0
2000	1	0
2003	2	0
Total	5	0

== Honors ==
=== Club ===
Alga Bishkek/Alga-RIIF Bishkek/Alga-PVO Bishkek/SKA-PVO Bishkek

- Kyrgyzstan League (5); 1992, 1993, 2000, 2001, 2002
- Kyrgyzstan Cup (9): 1992, 1993, 1997, 1998, 1999, 2000, 2001, 2002, 2003

Abdish-Ata Kant

- Kyrgyzstan Cup (1): 2007
