= Artyom Falyan =

Soviet Armenian footballer (1919–1977)

Personal information
- Full name: Artyom Grigoryevich Falyan
- Date of birth: 27 December 1919
- Place of birth: Baku, Azerbaijan Democratic Republic
- Date of death: 24 September 1977 (aged 57)
- Place of death: Leningrad, Russian SFSR, Soviet Union
- Position: Midfielder

Youth career
- FC Dinamo Baku

Senior career*
Years	Team	Apps	(Gls)
1938–1946	FC Dinamo Baku		
1946	Spartak Yerevan		
1947–1948	FC Dinamo Baku		
1949–1950	FC Neftyanik Baku		

Managerial career
- 1951–1954: FC Dinamo Baku (youth)
- 1954–1961: ODO Baku (assistant)
- 1961–1962: Neftchi PFK (academy)
- 1964: FC Tsement Novorossiysk
- 1965–1968: FC Ararat Yerevan
- 1968–1970: FC Zenit Leningrad
- 1970–1971: FC Shakhtar Donetsk
- 1972–1973: FC Alga Frunze
- 1973–1975: FC Kairat
- 1977: FC Amudarya Nukus
- * Club domestic league appearances and goals as of 10 April 2015

Artyom Grigoryevich Falyan (Russian: Артём Григорьевич Фальян; Armenian: Արտյոմ Գրիգորի Ֆալյան; 27 December 1919 — 24 September 1977) was a Soviet Armenian football manager and a player.
