= Danila Polyakov =

Russian footballer

Personal information
- Full name: Danila Alekseyevich Polyakov
- Date of birth: 9 June 1993 (age 33)
- Place of birth: Moscow, Russia
- Height: 1.73 m (5 ft 8 in)
- Position: Midfielder

Youth career
- FC Lokomotiv Moscow

Senior career*
Years	Team	Apps	(Gls)
2013–2018	FC Strogino Moscow	82	(1)
2017–2018	→ FC Veles Moscow (loan)	26	(0)
2018–2020	FC Veles Moscow	31	(1)
2021	FC Volga Ulyanovsk	13	(1)
2021–2022	FC Kolomna	16	(0)
2022–2023	FC Saturn Ramenskoye	20	(1)
- * Club domestic league appearances and goals

Danila Alekseyevich Polyakov (Russian: Данила Алексеевич Поляков; born 9 June 1993) is a Russian former football player.

== Club career ==
He made his debut in the Russian Football National League for FC Veles Moscow on 1 August 2020 in a game against FC Tekstilshchik Ivanovo, he substituted Ruslan Fishchenko in the 59th minute.
