= Sirotkin =

Sirotkin (Russian: Сироткин), feminine:Sirotkina, is a Russian surname. Notable people with the surname include:

- Alexander Sirotkin
- Andrey Sirotkin (born 1985), Russian boxer
- Liudmila Sirotkina (born 1981), Kyrgyzstani Olympic pentathlete
- Marta Sirotkina (born 1991), Russian tennis player
- Michael Sirotkin, American politician and lawyer
- Sergey Sirotkin (born 1995), Russian racing driver
- Sergey Sirotkin (politician) (1952–2023), Soviet and Russian politician

== See also ==
- Sirotin
