= Boris Podkorytov =

Soviet footballer (1948–2026)

Personal information
- Date of birth: 3 May 1948
- Place of birth: Frunze, Kirghiz SSR, Soviet Union
- Date of death: 4 March 2026 (aged 77)
- Positions: Forward; midfielder

Senior career*
Years	Team	Apps	(Gls)
1969	Lokomotiv Moscow	10	(0)
1970–1975	Alga Frunze	186	(15)

Managerial career
- 1984: Alga Frunze
- 1985–1988: MC Oran
- 1989–1990: Alga Frunze
- 1992–1993: Alga Bishkek
- 1993–1996: Kainar
- 1997–1998: Astana
- 1997–1998: Kazakhstan (assistant)
- 2003–2004: Dordoi-Dynamo
- 2005: Zhetysu
- 2006: Kyrgyzstan
- 2006–2011: Dordoi-Dynamo
- 2008–?: Dordoi-Dynamo (general director)
- 2011–?: Kyrgyzstan (consultant)
- * Club domestic league appearances and goals

Boris Petrovich Podkorytov (Russian: Борис Петрович Подкорытов; 3 May 1948 – 4 March 2026) was a Soviet and Kyrgyzstani professional football player and manager.

== Career ==
In 1969, Podkorytov began his professional career for the Lokomotiv Moscow. From 1970 until 1975 he played for the Alga Frunze as a forward or midfielder.

In 1984, he started his coaching career in Alga Frunze. Later he coached MC Oran, FC Zhetysu, Astana and Dordoi-Dynamo. In 2006, he was a coach of the Kyrgyzstan national team.

== Death ==
Podkorytov died on 4 March 2026, at the age of 77.
