= Vadim Kirichenko =

Soviet footballer and manager

Personal information
- Full name: Vadim Aleksandrovich Kirichenko
- Date of birth: 7 February 1936 (age 90)
- Place of birth: USSR
- Position: Defender

Senior career*
Years	Team	Apps	(Gls)
1957–1963	Spartak/Alga Frunze	?	(3)

Managerial career
- –1967: Alga Frunze
- 1968–1969: Zarafshan Navoiy
- 1969–1971: Spartak Ivano-Frankivsk
- 1971: Alga Frunze (director)
- 1972–1973: Lokomotiv Kherson
- 1975–1976: Spartak Ivano-Frankivsk
- 1978: Terek Grozny (assistant)
- 1979: Terek Grozny
- 1988: Krystal Kherson (assistant)
- * Club domestic league appearances and goals

Vadim Aleksandrovich Kirichenko (Russian: Вадим Александрович Кириченко; born 7 February 1936) is a retired Soviet football player and manager.

== Playing career ==
He made his debut in the Soviet First League in 1957 for Spartak/Alga Frunze.

== Coaching career ==
In his early career Kirichenko worked at the club Alga Frunze. Since 1968, he coached Zarafshan Navoiy, Spartak Ivano-Frankivsk, Lokomotiv Kherson and Terek Grozny.
