= FC Alga Bishkek =

Kyrgyz football club

Alga Bishkek
- Full name: Football Club Alga Bishkek; Алга Бишкек Футбол Клубу
- Founded: 1947; 79 years ago (as FC Zenit Frunze)
- Ground: Dynamo Stadion
- Capacity: 10,000
- Manager: Mirbek Shabdanov
- League: Kyrgyz Premier League
- 2025: KPL, 11th of 14
- Website: fc-alga.com
Home colours	Away colours

Football Club Alga Bishkek (Kyrgyz: Алга Бишкек Футбол Клубу, Alğa Bişkek Futbol Klubu) is a Kyrgyz professional football club based in Bishkek, that competes in the Kyrgyz Premier League, the top flight of Football in Kyrgyzstan. The club plays its home games at Dynamo Stadion.

== History ==
Alga Bishkek were established in Frunze during 1947, as FC Zenith Frunze. At the end of the 2005 season, the club, now called FC SKA-Shoro Bishkek, folded. In 2007 the club was reformed as FC Aviator AAL Bishkek, but last only half a season before ceasing operations. In 2010 the club was again reformed, this time under their previous name FC Alga Bishkek.

=== Name history ===
- 1947: Founded as FC Zenit Frunze.
- 1950: Renamed FC Trudovye Rezervy Frunze.
- 1953: Renamed FC Iskra Frunze.
- 1955: Renamed FC Spartak Frunze.
- 1961: Renamed FC Alga Frunze.
- 1992: Renamed FC Alga Bishkek.
- 1993: Renamed FC Alga-RIIF Bishkek.
- 1994: Renamed FC Alga Bishkek.
- 1996: Renamed FC Alga-PVO Bishkek.
- 1998: Renamed FC SKA-PVO Bishkek.
- 2004: Renamed FC SKA-Shoro Bishkek.
- 2005: Dissolved.
- 2007: Reformed as FC Aviator AAL Bishkek.
- 2007: Dissolved.
- 2010: Reformed as FC Alga Bishkek.

=== Domestic history ===
Season	League									Kyrgyzstan Cup	Top goalscorer		Managers
Season	Div.	Pos.	Pl.	W	D	L	GS	GA	P	Kyrgyzstan Cup	Name	League	Managers
1998	1st	2	14	9	4	1	36	5	31				
1999	1st	2	22	14	6	2	60	14	48				
2000	1st	1	22	21	1	0	98	8	64				
2001	1st	1	28	20	6	2	73	15	66				
2002	1st	1	18	15	3	0	47	11	48		(Kyrgyzstan) Viacheslav Pryanishnikov	10	
2003	1st	2	14	10	1	3	27	10	31				
2004	1st	2	36	30	3	3	107	20	93				
2005	1st	2	24	19	3	2	55	12	60				
2007	1st	10	15	10	1	4	28	7	31				
2010	1st	4	20	6	4	10	26	33	22				(Kyrgyzstan) Murat Jumakeev
2011	1st	4	20	7	5	8	29	36	26		(Kyrgyzstan) Vladimir Veryovkin	12	(Kyrgyzstan) Pavlo Sirotin
2012	1st	2	28	18	4	6	61	26	58	Runners-up	(Kyrgyzstan) Tursunali Rustamov	12	(Kyrgyzstan) Pavlo Sirotin
2013	1st	4	20	8	7	5	36	14	31				(Kyrgyzstan) Nematjan Zakirov
2014	1st	3	20	10	5	5	35	22	35		(Kyrgyzstan) Ivan Filatov	10	(Kyrgyzstan) Nurzat Kadyrkulov
2015	1st	4	20	8	6	6	32	18	30		(Kyrgyzstan) Ivan Filatov	9	(Kyrgyzstan) Nurzat Kadyrkulov
2016	1st	3	18	12	3	3	37	20	39				(Kyrgyzstan) Aleksandr Beldinov
2017	1st	5	20	5	6	9	19	32	21				
2018	1st	5	28	13	7	8	51	35	46	Round of 16	(Turkmenistan) Serdaraly Ataýew	12	(Kyrgyzstan) Andrey Krasnov
2019	1st	3	28	14	5	9	47	35	47	Semifinal			
2020	1st	2	14	9	2	3	15	12	29	Semifinal	(Kyrgyzstan) Temirbolot Tapaev (Kyrgyzstan) Chyngyz Idrisov	3	
2021	1st	3	28	17	4	7	39	25	55	Runners-up	(Nigeria) Aleriwa Oluwaseun	8	(Kyrgyzstan) Valeriy Berezovskiy
2022	1st	3	27	13	6	8	45	39	45	?	(Kyrgyzstan) Kadyrbek Shaarbekov	8	(Kyrgyzstan) Valeriy Berezovskiy
2023	1st	4	27	12	8	7	52	35	44	?	(Kyrgyzstan) Anton Zemlyanukhin	11	

=== Continental history ===
As of match played 15 August 2015

Competition	Pld	W	D	L	GF	GA
AFC Cup	2	1	1	0	3	1
Total	2	1	1	0	3	1

Season	Competition	Round	Club	Home	Away	Aggregate
2016	AFC Cup	Qualifying round	Benfica de Macau	2–0		
2016	AFC Cup	Qualifying round	(Bangladesh) Sheikh Jamal Dhanmondi	1–1		

== Players ==
=== Current squad ===
As of 2 April, 2026

Note: Flags indicate national team as defined under FIFA eligibility rules; some limited exceptions apply. Players may hold more than one non-FIFA nationality.

No.	Pos.	Nation	Player
1	GK	KGZ	Sultan Chomoev
3	DF	UKR	Volodymyr Zaimenko
4	DF	ESP	Monir Abdeselam
5	DF	RUS	Temur Mustafin
6	MF	UKR	Yevheniy Terzi
7	MF	UKR	Yevhen Chumak
8	MF	KGZ	Kimi Merk
9	FW	KGZ	Argen Emilbekov
10	MF	KGZ	Murolimzhon Akhmedov
11	FW	UKR	Oleksiy Zinkevych
15	DF	RUS	Anthony Samuel
17	FW	KGZ	Kai Merk
18	FW	RUS	Grigory Borisenko

No.	Pos.	Nation	Player
21	DF	KGZ	Ermek Kenzhebayev
23	MF	BLR	Dmitry Bessmertny
25	GK	KAZ	Evgeniy Sitdikov
27	FW	BRA	Igor Alves
28	FW	UKR	Dmytro Bilonoh
32	GK	RUS	Kirill Lisitsyn
35	GK	KGZ	Erzhan Tokotayev
44	DF	KGZ	Insan Talantbek Uulu
55	FW	NGR	Paul Ejeh
74	MF	UKR	Artem Bilyi
78	DF	KGZ	Arslan Bekberdinov
91	MF	UKR	Oleksiy Lobov
95	MF	UKR	Vladyslav Khomutov
99	MF	RUS	Altynbek Tagaev

== Managerial history ==
Name	Nat.	From	To	Honours	Notes
Valery Borisovich Behtenev	Soviet Union	1950	1950		
Fevzi Ziyaevich Karabadzhak	Soviet Union	1957	1957		
Fevzi Ziyaevich Karabadzhak	Soviet Union	1962	1962		
Peter Y. Bogolyubov	Soviet Union	1963	1963		
Nikolai Samarin	Soviet Union	1964	1964		
Viktor Ivanovich Novikov	Soviet Union	1965	1967		
Vadim Kirichenko	Soviet Union	1967	1967		
Nikolai Nikitivich Yemtsov	Soviet Union	1968	1968		
Alexander A.Keller	Soviet Union	1969	1970		
Viktor Semenovich Ponomarev	Soviet Union	1971	1971		
Vadim Kirichenko	Soviet Union	1971	1971		
Aleksandr Kochetkov	Soviet Union	1972	1972		
Artyom Falyan	Soviet UnionArmenia	1972	1973		
Nikolay Y. Glebov	Soviet Union	1973	1973		
Pyotr Shubin	Soviet Union	1974	1975		
Revgat Bibaev	Soviet Union	1978	1979		
Boris Podkorytov	Soviet UnionKyrgyzstan	1984	1984		
Mikhail Markovich Bichutsky	Soviet Union	1985	1988		
Boris Podkorytov	Soviet UnionKyrgyzstan	1989	1990		
Vyacheslav Solovyov	Soviet Union	1991	1991		
Boris Podkorytov	Soviet UnionKyrgyzstan	1992	1993		
Aleksandr Shumeyko	Kyrgyzstan	1997	1999		
Nematjan Zakirov	Kyrgyzstan	2000	2003		
Murat Jumakeev	Kyrgyzstan	2003	2005		
Murat Jumakeev	Kyrgyzstan	2010	2010		
Pavlo Sirotin	Kyrgyzstan	13 April 2011	2012		
Nematjan Zakirov	Kyrgyzstan	2013	2013		
Nurzat Kadyrkulov	Kyrgyzstan	2014	2015		
Aleksandr Beldinov	Kyrgyzstan	2016			

== Honours ==
=== Domestic ===
- Kyrgyzstan League
  - Champions (5): 1992, 1993, 2000, 2001, 2002
- Kyrgyzstan Cup
  - Winners (9): 1992, 1993, 1997, 1998, 1999, 2000, 2001, 2002, 2003
