= Motjeka Madisha =

South African soccer player (1995–2020)

Personal information
- Date of birth: 12 January 1995
- Date of death: 12 December 2020 (aged 25)
- Place of death: Kempton Park, South Africa
- Position: Defender

Senior career*
Years	Team	Apps	(Gls)
2014–2015	M Tigers		
2015–2016	Highlands Park	2	(0)
2016–2020	Mamelodi Sundowns	80	(3)
Total		82	(3)

International career
2015–2020	South Africa	13	(1)
- * Club domestic league appearances and goals

Motjeka Madisha (12 January 1995 – 12 December 2020) was a South African professional soccer player who played for Mamelodi Sundowns, as a defender.

== Club career ==
Madisha played club football for M Tigers, Highlands Park and Sundowns.

== International career ==
He earned 13 caps for the South Africa national team between 2015 and 2020, scoring once.

=== International goals ===
Scores and results list South Africa's goal tally first.

No.	Date	Venue	Opponent	Score	Result	Competition
1.	8 June 2018	Peter Mokaba Stadium, Polokwane, South Africa	Botswana	1–0	3–0	2018 COSAFA Cup

== Death ==
He died in a car crash on 12 December 2020, on a road east of Johannesburg.
