= Roman Krivulkin =

Belarusian footballer

Personal information
- Full name: Roman Vladimirovich Krivulkin
- Date of birth: 18 February 1996 (age 30)
- Place of birth: Lisuny, Orsha Raion, Vitebsk Oblast, Belarus
- Height: 1.70 m (5 ft 7 in)
- Position: Defender

Youth career
- 2009–2015: Zenit Saint Petersburg
- 2015–2016: CSKA Moscow

Senior career*
Years	Team	Apps	(Gls)
2015–2016	CSKA Moscow	0	(0)
2017	Krumkachy Minsk	9	(0)
2017–2019	Torpedo Minsk	37	(1)
2019–2020	Slutsk	32	(1)
2021–2022	Leningradets	16	(2)
- * Club domestic league appearances and goals as of 10 June 2022

Roman Vladimirovich Krivulkin (Belarusian: Раман Уладзіміравіч Крывулькін; Russian: Роман Владимирович Кривулькин; born 18 February 1996) is a Belarusian professional footballer.

== Career ==
Born in a small village in Vitebsk Oblast, Belarus, he moved to Saint Petersburg, Russia at the age of 6. After studying for a few years in FC Zenit Academy, he signed with CSKA Moscow in 2015. Unable to push his way to the senior team, he returned to Belarus in 2017 and signed with Krumkachy Minsk.
