= Pavlo Savelenko =

Ukrainian footballer

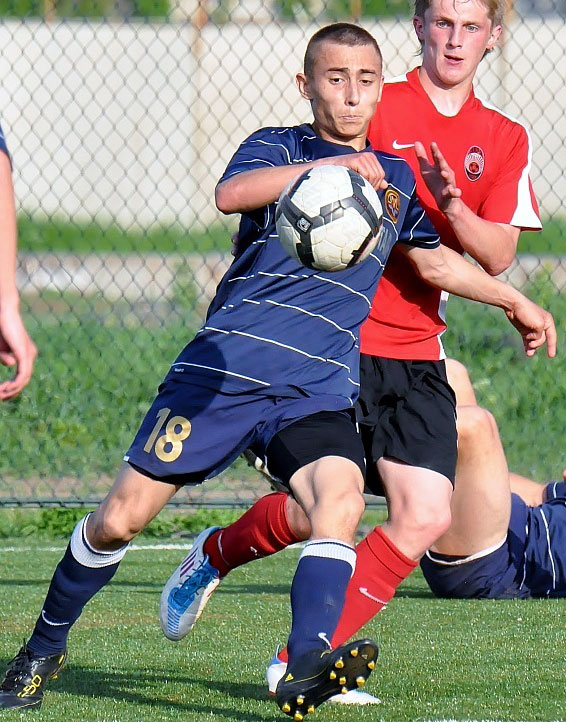

Personal information
- Full name: Pavlo Serhiyovych Savelenko
- Date of birth: 14 July 1993 (age 33)
- Place of birth: Ukraine
- Height: 1.72 m (5 ft 7 1/2 in)
- Position: Midfielder

Youth career
- 2007–2009: FC Metalurh Zaporizhzhia

Senior career*
Years	Team	Apps	(Gls)
2009–2015	FC Metalurh Zaporizhzhia	0	(0)
2009–2012	→FC Metalurh-2 Zaporizhzhia	20	(0)
2016	FC Avanhard Kramatorsk	11	(0)

International career^{‡}
2014	Ukraine-21	1	(0)
- * Club domestic league appearances and goals as of 5 June 2016 ‡ National team caps and goals as of 5 June 2016

Pavlo Savelenko (Ukrainian: Павло Сергійович Савеленко; born 14 July 1993) is a Ukrainian football midfielder who played for FC Avanhard Kramatorsk in the Ukrainian First League.

Savelenko is a graduate of the FC Metalurh Zaporizhzhia youth sportive school.

He was called up to play for the 23-man squad of the Ukraine national under-21 football team by trainer Serhiy Kovalets in the Commonwealth of Independent States Cup in January 2014.
