= Pavel Chernyshov =

Belarusian footballer

Personal information
- Date of birth: 12 July 1995 (age 31)
- Place of birth: Gomel, Belarus
- Height: 1.80 m (5 ft 11 in)
- Position: Midfielder

Youth career
- 2012–2014: Gomel

Senior career*
Years	Team	Apps	(Gls)
2014–2017	Gomel	33	(0)
2018	UAS Zhitkovichi	19	(2)
2019	Sputnik Rechitsa	2	(0)

International career
2015	Belarus U21	6	(0)
- * Club domestic league appearances and goals as of 31 December 2019

Pavel Chernyshov (Belarusian: Павал Чарнышоў; Russian: Павел Чернышов; born 12 July 1995) is a Belarusian former professional footballer.
