= Oleksandr Dyachenko =

Ukrainian footballer

Personal information
- Full name: Oleksandr Andriyovych Dyachenko
- Date of birth: 1 March 1994 (age 32)
- Place of birth: Kiev, Ukraine
- Height: 1.88 m (6 ft 2 in)
- Position: Goalkeeper

Youth career
- 2007–2009: Dynamo Kyiv
- 2009–2011: Metalist Kharkiv

Senior career*
Years	Team	Apps	(Gls)
2011–2012	Karpaty Lviv	0	(0)
2013–2015	Obolon-Brovar Kyiv	20	(0)
2015–2018	Rukh Vynnyky	46	(0)

International career^{‡}
2010	Ukraine-17	1	(0)
2015	Ukraine-20	1	(0)
- * Club domestic league appearances and goals as of 10 December 2018 ‡ National team caps and goals as of 10 December 2018

Oleksandr Dyachenko (Ukrainian: Олександр Андрійович Дяченко; born 1 March 1994) is a Ukrainian former football goalkeeper who last played for FC Rukh Vynnyky in the Ukrainian First League.

Dyachenko is product of youth team systems of FC Dynamo and FC Metalist. Made his debut for FC Obolon-Brovar Kyiv entering as a player in game against FC Real Pharma Ovidiopol on 6 September 2013 in Ukrainian Second League.

In November 2013, Dyachenko was called up for Ukraine national football team under-20 by coach Volodymyr Horilyi for training process .

He retired at age 24 after the latest injury when he broke his leg.
