= Pavel Sirotin =

Soviet and Ukrainian football player and manager (born 1967)

Personal information
- Full name: Pavel Anatolyevich Sirotin
- Date of birth: 29 September 1967 (age 59)
- Place of birth: Frunze, USSR
- Position: Goalkeeper

Senior career*
Years	Team	Apps	(Gls)
1983	TSOR Frunze	1	(0)
1984–1987	Alga Frunze	53	(0)
1988	Alay Osh	20	(0)
1989–1991	Alga Frunze	69	(0)
1992	Krystal Chortkiv	18	(0)
1992–1994	Kremin Kremenchuk	39	(0)
1995–1996	Bukovyna Chernivtsi	72	(0)
1997–1998	Prykarpattya Ivano-Frankivsk	53	(0)
1999	Kremin Kremenchuk	30	(0)
2000	Bukovyna Chernivtsi	29	(0)
2001	Nyva Ternopil	10	(0)
2001	→ Ternopil-Nyva-2	5	(0)
2002	Lukor Kalush	7	(0)
2002	Prykarpattya Ivano-Frankivsk	0	(0)
2003–2004	Bukovyna Chernivtsi	42	(0)
200x–200x	MFC Merkuriy-ChTEI Chernivtsi	?	(0)
2007	FC Luzhany	7	(0)
2007–2008	Bukovyna Chernivtsi	25	(0)

Managerial career
- 2009: Bukovyna Chernivtsi (assistant)
- 2010: Dordoi-94 Bishkek
- 2011–2012: Alga Bishkek
- * Club domestic league appearances and goals

Pavel Anatolyevich Sirotin (Russian: Павел Анатольевич Сиротин; born 29 September 1967 in Frunze, USSR) is a Soviet and Kyrgyzstani professional football player and manager.

== Career ==
Pavel Sirotin during his long football career has played as goalkeeper from 1983 for the Kyrgyzstani clubs TSOR Frunze, Alga Frunze, Alay Osh and from 1992 for the Ukrainian clubs Krystal Chortkiv, Kremin Kremenchuk, Bukovyna Chernivtsi, Prykarpattya Ivano-Frankivsk, Nyva Ternopil, Lukor Kalush and FC Luzhany.

In 2009, he started his coaching career. He helped to train goalkeepers in Bukovyna Chernivtsi. In 2010, he worked as head coach of the Dordoi-94 Bishkek and since 2011 until 2012 he coached the Alga Bishkek.
