= Aleksey Teslyuk =

Belarusian footballer

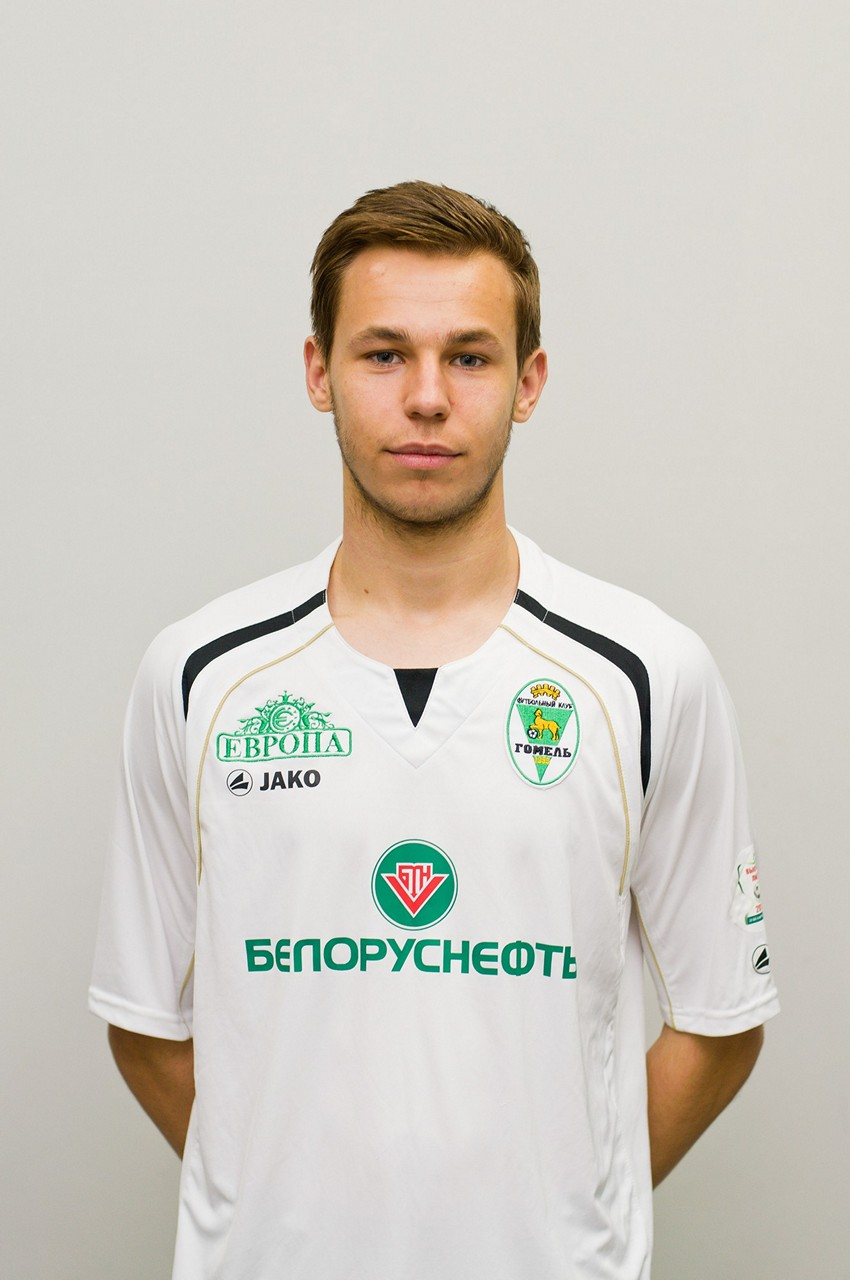

Personal information
- Date of birth: 10 January 1994 (age 32)
- Place of birth: Davyd-Haradok, Brest Oblast, Belarus
- Height: 1.83 m (6 ft 0 in)
- Position: Forward

Youth career
- 2011–2012: Gomel

Senior career*
Years	Team	Apps	(Gls)
2012–2018	Gomel	88	(12)
2018	→ Smolevichi (loan)	5	(1)
2019	Rukh Brest	20	(4)
2020	Gomel	14	(2)
2021	Volna Pinsk	31	(12)
2022	Lokomotiv Gomel	18	(3)

International career
2013–2016	Belarus U21	19	(1)
- * Club domestic league appearances and goals as of 31 December 2022

Aleksey Teslyuk (Belarusian: Аляксей Цяслюк; Russian: Алексей Теслюк; born 10 October 1994) is a Belarusian former professional footballer.
