= Leonid Akulinin =

Ukrainian football striker

Personal information
- Full name: Leonid Ihorovych Akulinin
- Date of birth: 7 March 1993 (age 33)
- Place of birth: Donetsk, Ukraine
- Height: 1.94 m (6 ft 4 1/2 in)
- Position: Forward

Team information
- Current team: FC Gießen
- Number: 29

Youth career
- 2005–2008: Olimpik Donetsk
- 2008–2009: Shakhtar Donetsk

Senior career*
Years	Team	Apps	(Gls)
2009–2015	Shakhtar Donetsk	0	(0)
2009–2010	→ Shakhtar-3 Donetsk	24	(5)
2013	→ Hoverla Uzhhorod (loan)	0	(0)
2014–2015	→ Shakhtar-3 Donetsk	15	(4)
2015–2016	Bohemians Praha	20	(0)
2016–2017	Sūduva Marijampolė	6	(0)
2017–2018	Karpaty Lviv	16	(1)
2018	Arsenal Kyiv	6	(0)
2019–2021	Fotbal Třinec	27	(5)
2022–	FC Gießen	9	(3)

International career
2009	Ukraine U16	1	(0)
2013–2014	Ukraine U21	11	(4)
- * Club domestic league appearances and goals as of 19 November 2022

Leonid Akulinin (Ukrainian: Леонід Ігорович Акулінін; born 7 March 1993) is a Ukrainian football forward for German club FC Gießen.

== Career ==
He was a member of the Ukraine national under-21 football team, where he was called-up first time by Serhiy Kovalets for Valeriy Lobanovskyi Memorial Tournament in 2013.

He was chosen best player of the 2014 Commonwealth of Independent States Cup.
