= Dmitry Ignatenko (footballer, born 1995) =

Belarusian footballer

Personal information
- Date of birth: 1 February 1995 (age 31)
- Place of birth: Gomel, Belarus
- Height: 1.89 m (6 ft 2 1/2 in)
- Position: Defender

Youth career
- 2012–2014: Gomel

Senior career*
Years	Team	Apps	(Gls)
2014–2019	Gomel	35	(0)
2018	→ Belshina Bobruisk (loan)	10	(0)
2020	Gorodeya	22	(1)
2021–2022	Slavia Mozyr	14	(1)
2023	MNPZ Mozyr	5	(0)

International career
2013	Belarus U19	3	(0)
2014–2015	Belarus U21	13	(0)
- * Club domestic league appearances and goals

Dmitry Aliaksandravich Ignatenko (Belarusian: Дзмітрый Аляксандравіч Ігнаценка; born 1 February 1995) is a Belarusian former professional footballer.
