= Semyon Shestilovsky =

Belarusian footballer

Personal information
- Full name: Semyon Gennadyevich Shestilovsky
- Date of birth: 30 May 1994 (age 32)
- Place of birth: Fanipol, Minsk Oblast, Belarus
- Height: 1.90 m (6 ft 3 in)
- Position: Defender

Youth career
- 2010–2011: Dinamo Minsk

Senior career*
Years	Team	Apps	(Gls)
2011–2017	Dinamo Minsk	1	(0)
2011	→ Dinamo-2 Minsk	10	(1)
2012	→ Bereza-2010 (loan)	19	(1)
2013–2014	→ Bereza-2010 (loan)	25	(1)
2015–2017	→ Gorodeya (loan)	44	(1)
2018–2020	Gorodeya	55	(0)
2020–2022	Slavia Mozyr	50	(4)
2023–2024	Shakhtyor Soligorsk	15	(0)
2025–2026	Belshina Bobruisk	34	(1)

International career^{‡}
2010–2011	Belarus U17	6	(0)
2012	Belarus U19	3	(0)
2013–2016	Belarus U21	32	(1)
- * Club domestic league appearances and goals as of 8 September 2026 ‡ National team caps and goals as of 31 December 2016

Semyon Gennadyevich Shestilovsky (Belarusian: Сямён Генадзьевіч Шасцілоўскі; Russian: Семён Геннадьевич Шестиловский; born 30 May 1994) is a Belarusian professional footballer.

== Honours ==
- Belarusian Super Cup winner: 2023
