= Ruslan Bolov =

Russian footballer

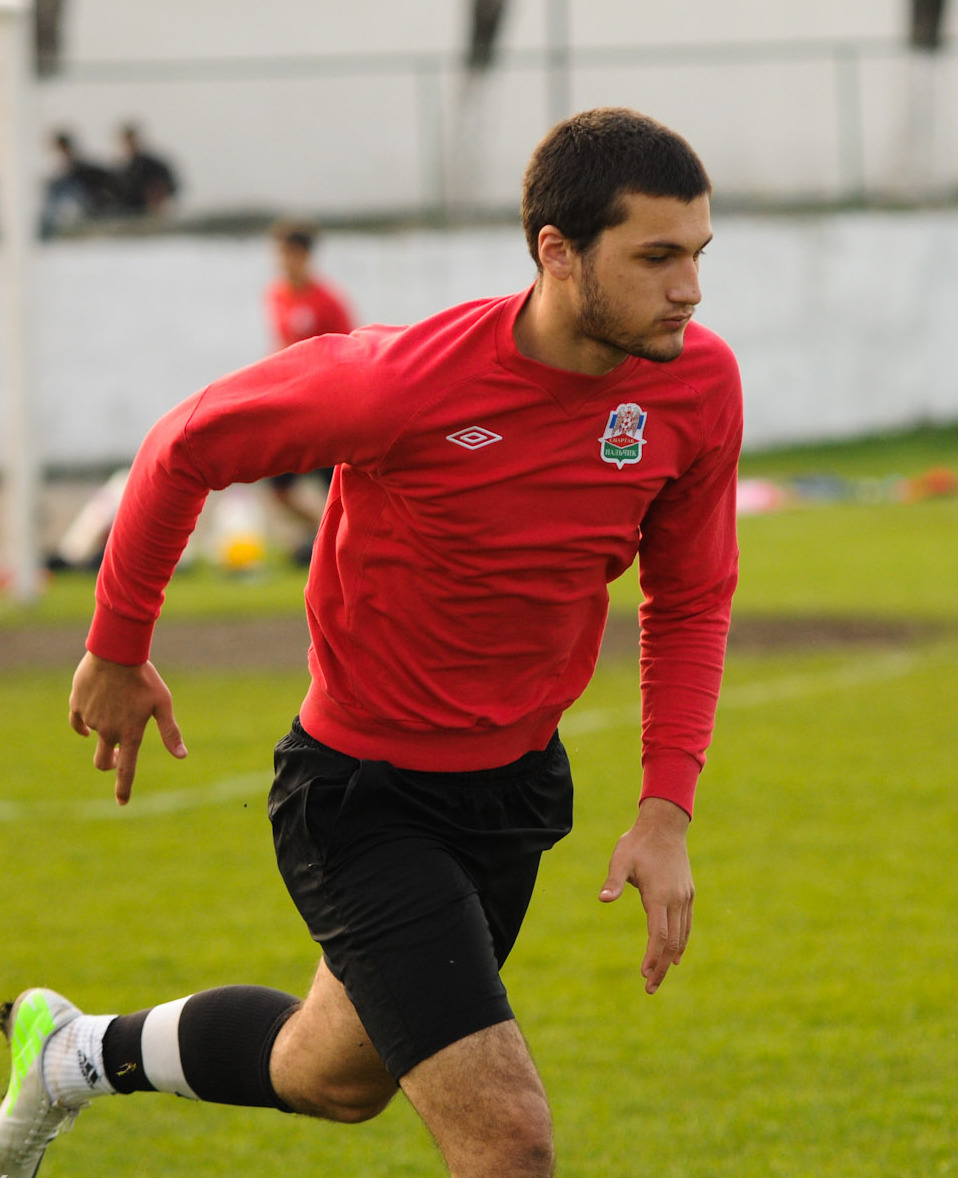

Personal information
- Full name: Ruslan Khasinovich Bolov
- Date of birth: 7 May 1994 (age 32)
- Place of birth: Nalchik, Kabardino-Balkaria, Russia
- Height: 1.78 m (5 ft 10 in)
- Positions: Forward; midfielder

Team information
- Current team: Murom
- Number: 88

Youth career
- 1999–2012: Spartak Nalchik
- 2013: Krasnodar

Senior career*
Years	Team	Apps	(Gls)
2010–2013	Spartak Nalchik	24	(2)
2013–2018	Krasnodar	0	(0)
2013	→ Krasnodar-2	10	(2)
2014	→ Spartak Nalchik (loan)	11	(2)
2014–2016	→ Volgar Astrakhan (loan)	46	(5)
2016–2017	→ Fakel Voronezh (loan)	32	(2)
2017–2018	→ Avangard Kursk (loan)	28	(3)
2018	Khimki	11	(0)
2018	→ Khimki-M	1	(1)
2019	Gomel	29	(9)
2020	Navbahor Namangan	20	(3)
2021–2023	Okzhetpes	58	(40)
2024	Rotor Volgograd	14	(2)
2024–2025	Zhetysu	27	(4)
2025–2026	Tyumen	26	(8)
2026–	Murom	13	(12)

International career
2010	Russia U17	4	(1)
2012	Russia U18	2	(1)
2012–2013	Russia U19	6	(2)
2012–2016	Russia U21	19	(5)
- * Club domestic league appearances and goals as of 1 November 2026

Ruslan Khasinovich Bolov (Russian: Руслан Хасинович Болов, born 7 May 1994) is a Russian professional football player who plays for Murom.

== Club career ==
He made his Russian Premier League debut for PFC Spartak Nalchik on 18 March 2012 in a game against FC Krylia Sovetov Samara.

He played in the 2017–18 Russian Cup final for FC Avangard Kursk on the 9 May 2018 in the Volgograd Arena against 2–1 winners FC Tosno.

== Honours ==
=== Individual ===
- CIS Cup top goalscorer: 2014 (shared)
