= Akramzhon Umarov =

Kyrgyzstani footballer

Personal information
- Full name: Akramzhon Muralimovich Umarov
- Date of birth: 7 February 1994 (age 32)
- Place of birth: Osh, Kyrgyzstan
- Height: 1.83 m (6 ft 0 in)
- Position: Defender

Team information
- Current team: Alay Osh

Youth career
- 2011–2012: Zhivoe Pivo

Senior career*
Years	Team	Apps	(Gls)
2012–2015	Abdish-Ata Kant	48	(5)
2016	Krumkachy Minsk	0	(0)
2016–2019	Alay Osh		
2020	Neftchi Kochkor-Ata	9	(3)
2021–2022	Alay Osh	29	(2)
2023	Neftchi Kochkor-Ata	16	(3)
2024–	Alay Osh	22	(5)

International career^{‡}
2013–2016	Kyrgyzstan U21	13	(3)
2012–2019	Kyrgyzstan	3	(0)
- * Club domestic league appearances and goals as of 31 December 2024 ‡ National team caps and goals as of 9 November 2019

Akramzhon Muralimovich Umarov (Kyrgyz: Акрамжон Умаров; Russian: Акрамжон Муралимович Умаров; born 7 February 1994) is a Kyrgyzstani footballer who plays as defender who plays for Alay Osh.

== International career ==
He is a member of the Kyrgyzstan national football team. He made his debut in the match vs. Kazakhstan, held on 1 June 2012.

== Career statistics ==
=== International ===
Kyrgyzstan national team
Year	Apps	Goals
2012	1	0
Total	1	0

Statistics accurate as of match played 1 June 2012
