= Matvey Frantskevich =

Belarusian professional footballer

Personal information
- Full name: Matvey Sergeyevich Frantskevich
- Date of birth: 18 March 1995 (age 31)
- Place of birth: Minsk, Belarus
- Height: 1.86 m (6 ft 1 in)
- Position: Goalkeeper

Youth career
- 2010–2011: RUOR Minsk
- 2012–2014: Belshina Bobruisk

Senior career*
Years	Team	Apps	(Gls)
2013–2015	Belshina Bobruisk	1	(0)
2016–2017	Torpedo Minsk	9	(0)
2017	→ Osipovichi (loan)	14	(0)
2018	Gorodeya	0	(0)
2018–2019	Smorgon	14	(0)

International career
2011–2012	Belarus U17	7	(0)
2013	Belarus U19	2	(0)

Managerial career
- 2019–2020: Oshmyany (gk coach)
- 2021: Dinamo Minsk (youth gk coach)
- 2022–: Minsk (women) (gk coach)
- * Club domestic league appearances and goals

Matvey Sergeyevich Frantskevich (Belarusian: Матвей Францкевіч; Russian: Матвей Сергеевич Францкевич; born 18 March 1995) is a Belarusian professional football coach and former player.
