= Aleksandr Yanchenko =

Belarusian footballer

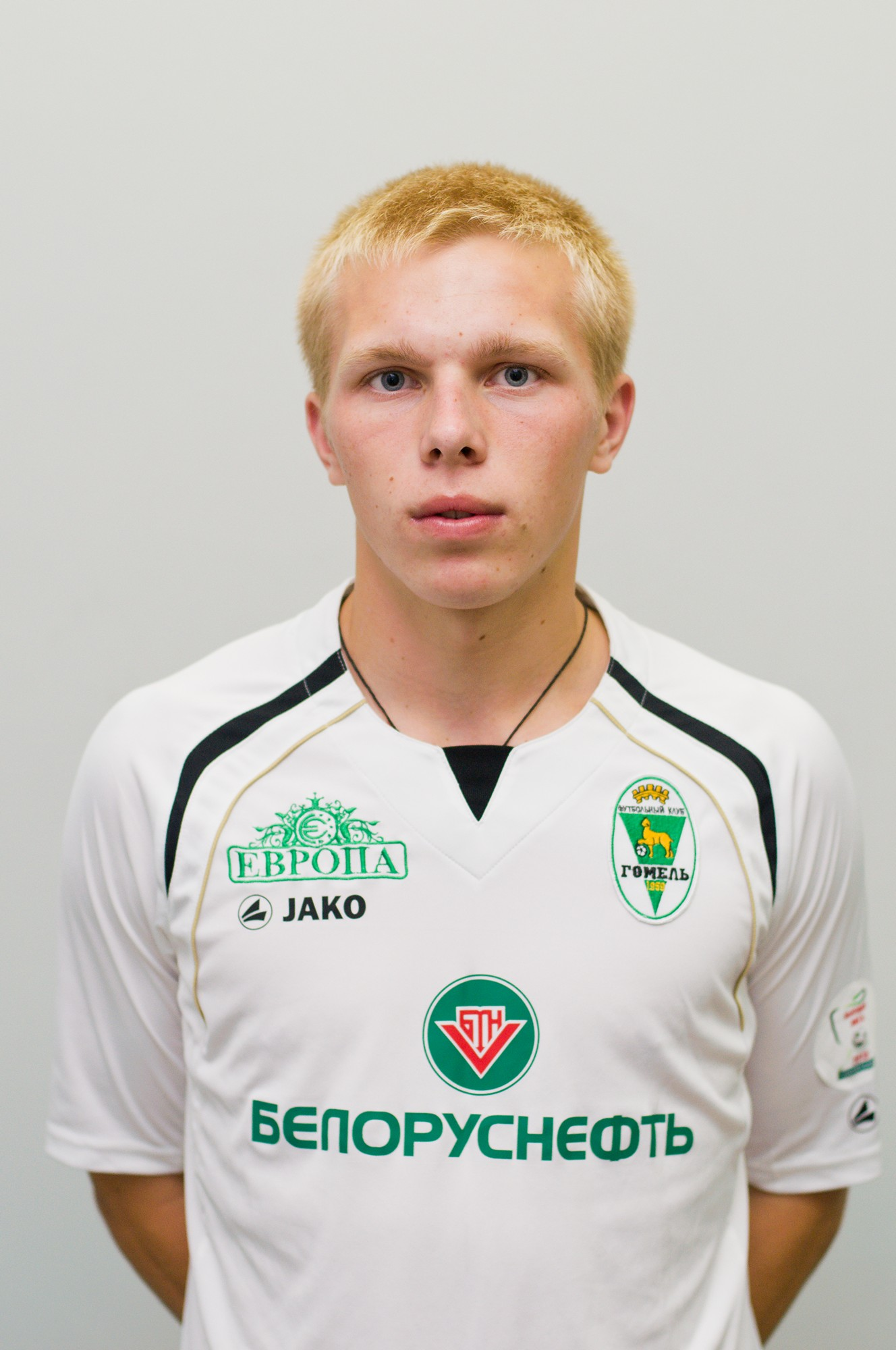

Personal information
- Date of birth: 14 February 1995 (age 31)
- Place of birth: Gomel, Belarus
- Height: 1.75 m (5 ft 9 in)
- Position: Forward

Team information
- Current team: Lokomotiv Gomel (assistant coach)

Youth career
- 2011–2012: Gomel

Senior career*
Years	Team	Apps	(Gls)
2013–2018	Gomel	72	(5)
2017	→ Granit Mikashevichi (loan)	0	(0)
2019–2020	Naftan Novopolotsk	34	(9)
2021–2024	Lokomotiv Gomel	51	(16)

International career^{‡}
2014–2016	Belarus U21	25	(3)

Managerial career
- 2024–: Lokomotiv Gomel (assistant)
- * Club domestic league appearances and goals as of 10 December 2024 ‡ National team caps and goals as of 7 September 2016

Aleksandr Yanchenko (Belarusian: Аляксандр Янчанка; Russian: Александр Янченко; born 14 February 1995) is a Belarusian former professional footballer.
