= Eduards Tīdenbergs =

Latvian footballer

Personal information
- Date of birth: 18 December 1994 (age 31)
- Place of birth: Latvia
- Height: 1.83 m (6 ft 0 in)
- Position: Midfielder

Team information
- Current team: Dubočica
- Number: 5

Senior career*
Years	Team	Apps	(Gls)
2012–2014	Ventspils II		
2014–2020	Ventspils	145	(19)
2020–2024	Liepāja	86	(14)
2025–	Dubočica	13	(0)

International career^{‡}
2012	Latvia U19	3	(1)
2014–2016	Latvia U21	27	(2)
2020–	Latvia	1	(0)
- * Club domestic league appearances and goals as of 1 July 2025 ‡ National team caps and goals as of 19:31, 7 October 2020 (UTC)

Eduards Tīdenbergs (born 18 December 1994) is a Latvian footballer who plays as a midfielder for Serbian club Dubočica and the Latvia national team.

== Career ==
Tīdenbergs made his international debut for Latvia on 7 October 2020 in a friendly match against Montenegro, which finished as a 1–1 away draw.

== Career statistics ==
=== International ===
As of 7 October 2020

Latvia
Year	Apps	Goals
2020	1	0
Total	1	0
