= Ion Ursu =

Moldovan footballer

Personal information
- Full name: Ion Ursu
- Date of birth: 19 August 1994 (age 32)
- Place of birth: Moldova
- Height: 1.85 m (6 ft 1 in)
- Position: Striker

Team information
- Current team: Petrocub Hîncești
- Number: 23

Senior career*
Years	Team	Apps	(Gls)
2011–2013	Sfîntul Gheorghe	32	(3)
2013–2015	FC Veris	23	(2)
2015	Academia Chișinău	10	(0)
2015–2017	FC Saxan	36	(1)
2017–	Petrocub Hîncești	14	(1)

International career
2013–2015	Moldova U21	4	(1)
- * Club domestic league appearances and goals

Ion Ursu (born 19 August 1994) is a Moldovan striker who currently is playing for Petrocub Hîncești and Moldova U21.
