= Kyrgyzstan national under-20 football team =

National U-20 association football team

Kyrgyzstan Under-20
- Association: Football Federation of the Kyrgyz Republic
- Confederation: AFC
- Head coach: Sergei Puchkov
- Home stadium: Spartak Stadium
First colours	Second colours

AFC U-20 Asian Cup
- Appearances: 3 (first in 2006)
- Best result: Group stage (2006, 2023)

The Kyrgyzstan U-20 national football team is a youth football team operated under the Football Federation of the Kyrgyz Republic. The team represented Kyrgyzstan in the 2015 Commonwealth of Independent States Cup and 2006 AFC Youth Championship.

== Current squad ==
The following 23 players were called up for the 2023 AFC U-20 Asian Cup.

No.	Pos.	Player	Date of birth (age)	Club
1	GK	Sultan Chomoev	20 January 2003 (aged 20)	(Kyrgyz Football Union) Dordoi Bishkek
2	DF	Khristiyan Brauzman	15 August 2003 (aged 19)	(Kyrgyz Football Union) Abdysh-Ata Kant
3	DF	Elaman Akylbekov	11 August 2003 (aged 19)	(Kyrgyz Football Union) Ilbirs Bishkek
4	DF	Said Datsiev	14 April 2003 (aged 19)	(Kyrgyz Football Union) Dordoi Bishkek
5	DF	Temirlan Samat Uulu	2 May 2003 (aged 19)	(Kyrgyz Football Union) Ilbirs Bishkek
6	MF	Baibol Ermekov	8 September 2005 (aged 17)	(Kyrgyz Football Union) Ilbirs Bishkek
7	FW	Atay Ilichbek Uulu	18 March 2004 (aged 18)	(Kyrgyz Football Union) Ilbirs Bishkek
8	MF	Mirlan Bekberdinov	14 August 2003 (aged 19)	(Kyrgyz Football Union) Ilbirs Bishkek
9	DF	Nurbol Baktybekov	23 February 2004 (aged 19)	(Kyrgyz Football Union) Ilbirs Bishkek
10	MF	Bektur Abdyvaliev	29 April 2003 (aged 19)	(Kyrgyz Football Union) Dordoi Bishkek
11	MF	Biimyrza Zhenishbekov	4 September 2003 (aged 19)	(Kyrgyz Football Union) Abdysh-Ata Kant
12	DF	Bayastan Bokonov	18 May 2004 (aged 18)	(Kyrgyz Football Union) Dordoi Bishkek
13	GK	Astapbek Askaralyev	17 October 2003 (aged 19)	(Kyrgyz Football Union) Ilbirs Bishkek
14	MF	Arsen Sharshenbekov	16 March 2004 (aged 18)	(Russian Football Union) Alania Vladikavkaz
15	MF	Bektur Kochkonbaev	11 January 2003 (aged 20)	(Kyrgyz Football Union) Talant
16	GK	Kurmanbek Nurlanbekov	1 April 2004 (aged 18)	(Kyrgyz Football Union) Dordoi Bishkek
17	DF	Arslan Bekberdinov	14 August 2003 (aged 19)	(Kyrgyz Football Union) Abdysh-Ata Kant
18	FW	Suleiman Dzhumabekov	24 December 2003 (aged 19)	(Kyrgyz Football Union) Talant
19	FW	Marlen Murzakhmatov	21 May 2003 (aged 19)	(Kyrgyz Football Union) Dordoi Bishkek
20	MF	Irrakhimbek Nurmat Uulu	27 January 2003 (aged 20)	(Kyrgyz Football Union) Kaganat
21	MF	Ermek Kenzhebaev	3 April 2003 (aged 19)	(Kyrgyz Football Union) Dordoi Bishkek
22	MF	Kimi Merk	6 July 2004 (aged 18)	(German Football Association) 1. FC Kaiserslautern
23	FW	Elzar Melisbek Uulu	7 June 2004 (aged 18)	(Kyrgyz Football Union) Ilbirs Bishkek

== AFC U-20 Asian Cup ==
Edition	Round	MP	W	D	L	GF	GA
(India) 2006	Group stage	3	0	2	1	1	8
(Uzbekistan) 2023	Group stage	3	0	1	2	1	5
(China) 2025	Group stage	3	0	0	3	3	14
Total	3/41	9	0	3	6	5	27

== Head-to-head record ==
The following table shows Kyrgyzstan's head-to-head record in the AFC U-20 Asian Cup.

Opponent	Pld	W	D	L	GF	GA	GD	Win %
Australia	1	0	0	1	1	5	−4	0.00
China	2	0	1	1	3	6	−3	0.00
India	1	0	1	0	1	1	+0	0.00
Japan	1	0	0	1	0	3	−3	0.00
Jordan	1	0	1	0	0	0	+0	0.00
Qatar	1	0	0	1	0	4	−4	0.00
Saudi Arabia	1	0	0	1	0	1	−1	0.00
South Korea	1	0	0	1	0	7	−7	0.00
Total	9	0	3	6	5	27	−22	0.00
