= FC Strogino Moscow =

- Full name: Football Club Strogino Moscow
- Founded: 2010
- Ground: Yantar Stadium
- Capacity: 2,000
- Owner: Moscow
- Chairman: Dmitry Strutynskiy
- Manager: Sergei Zagidullin
- League: Russian Second League, Division B, Group 3
- 2026: 11th
- Website: mfa.mossport.ru
Home colours	Away colours

FC Strogino Moscow (Russian: ФК Строгино Москва) is a Russian professional football club based in Moscow. It started its professional history in the 2013–14 season of the Russian Professional Football League. FC Strogino's Yantar (Amber) Stadium was the preparation base for the Russian Student's Team before the 2017 Summer Universiade.

== Current squad ==
As of 13 September 2026, according to the Second League website.

Note: Flags indicate national team as defined under FIFA eligibility rules; some limited exceptions apply. Players may hold more than one non-FIFA nationality.

No.	Pos.	Nation	Player
1	GK	RUS	Fyodor Starostin
2	MF	RUS	Timur Khannanov
3	DF	RUS	Kirill Ivanov
4	DF	RUS	Konstantin Shoronov
6	MF	RUS	Andrey Alekseyenkov
7	MF	RUS	Arseny Petrov
8	MF	RUS	Dmitry Komarov
9	MF	RUS	Mikhail Mikaelyan
10	FW	RUS	Albert Tsechoyev
11	DF	RUS	Valery Ozerov
12	DF	RUS	Timur Nasyrov
15	FW	RUS	Sergey Guzyuk
17	MF	RUS	Danil Pekhnov
18	MF	RUS	Nikita Bogatikov
19	FW	RUS	Nikita Chelyshev
20	MF	RUS	Gleb Nikishov

No.	Pos.	Nation	Player
21	DF	RUS	Daniil Shapayev
23	DF	RUS	Yaroslav Borovikov
24	FW	RUS	Vladislav Kozlov
27	MF	RUS	Danila Ganichev
30	GK	RUS	Vladislav Dzhurayev
33	MF	RUS	Yegor Toporov
35	MF	RUS	Yegor Mishchenko
37	MF	RUS	Andrey Chobanu
40	DF	RUS	Maksim Kiselyov
44	FW	RUS	Georgy Gogidze
46	GK	RUS	Andrey Maskalev
47	MF	RUS	Matvey Redkin
48	DF	RUS	Vladislav Dashkin
49	FW	RUS	Yegor Kornilov
55	DF	RUS	Nikita Perinsky
66	MF	RUS	Artyom Vanyashev
