= Farkhat Musabekov =

Kyrgyzstani footballer (born 1994)

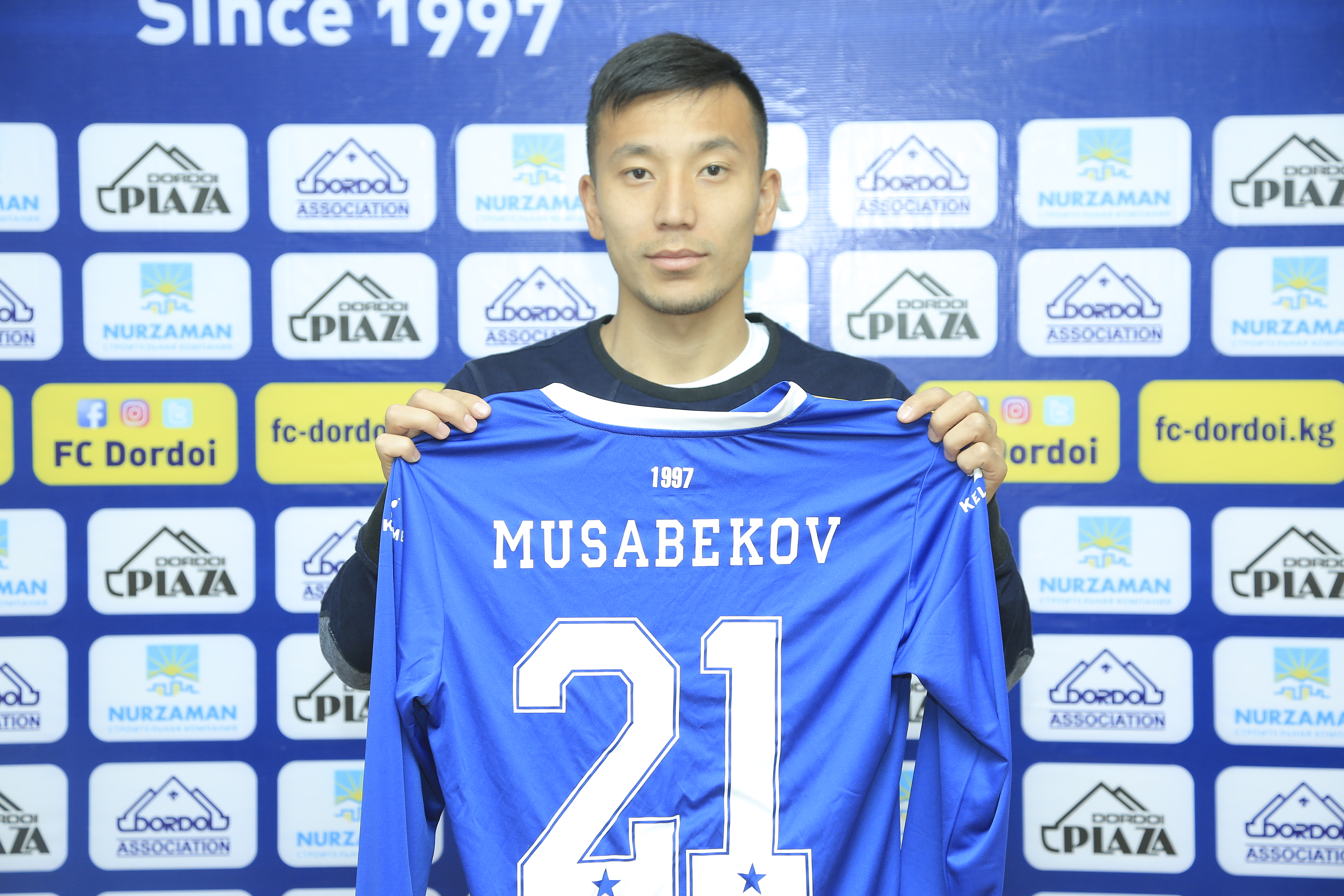

Personal information
- Full name: Farkhat Musabekovich Musabekov
- Date of birth: 3 January 1994 (age 32)
- Place of birth: Bishkek, Kyrgyzstan
- Height: 1.72 m (5 ft 8 in)
- Position: Winger

Team information
- Current team: FC Bars Issyk-Kul
- Number: 11

Senior career*
Years	Team	Apps	(Gls)
2014–2016	Abdysh-Ata Kant		
2016–2017	Academia Chișinău	3	(0)
2016	→ TSK Simferopol (loan)	5	(0)
2017	Olmaliq	14	(0)
2018–2021	Dordoi Bishkek		
2021–2022	Turan	17	(1)
2022–2023	Shakhter Karagandy	10	(1)
2023–2024	Abdysh-Ata Kant		

International career
2013–2016	Kyrgyzstan U-21	14	(0)
2014	Kyrgyzstan U-23	3	(0)
2015–	Kyrgyzstan	48	(2)
- * Club domestic league appearances and goals

Farkhat Musabekovich Musabekov (Kyrgyz: Фархат Мусабеков; Russian: Фархат Мусабекович Мусабеков; born 3 January 1994) is a Kyrgyzstani professional footballer who plays as a winger for FC Bars Issyk-Kul and the national team of Kyrgyzstan.

== Career ==
On 22 July 2021, Musabekov was released from his contract by Dordoi Bishkek.

On 23 July 2021, Musabekov signed for Turan. On 24 June 2022, Musabekov left Turan by mutual agreement.

== Career statistics ==
=== Club ===
As of match played 6 November 2022

Appearances and goals by club, season and competition
Club	Season	League			National Cup		Continental		Other		Total	
Club	Season	Division	Apps	Goals	Apps	Goals	Apps	Goals	Apps	Goals	Apps	Goals
Academia Chișinău	2015–16	Divizia Națională	3	0	1	0	—		—		4	0
Academia Chișinău	2016–17	Divizia Națională	0	0	0	0	—		—		0	0
Academia Chișinău	Total		3	0	1	0	-	-	-	-	4	0
TSK Simferopol (loan)	2016–17	Crimean Premier League					—		—			
Olmaliq	2017	Uzbekistan Super League	14	0	1	0	—		—		15	0
Dordoi Bishkek	2018	Kyrgyz Premier League					—		—			
Dordoi Bishkek	2019	Kyrgyz Premier League					6	0	—			
Dordoi Bishkek	2020	Kyrgyz Premier League					—		—			
Dordoi Bishkek	2021	Kyrgyz Premier League					2	0	—			
Dordoi Bishkek	Total						8	0	-	-	8	0
Turan	2021	Kazakhstan Premier League	7	0	4	0	—		—		11	0
Turan	2022	Kazakhstan Premier League	10	1	0	0	—		—		10	1
Turan	Total		17	1	4	0	-	-	-	-	21	1
Shakhter Karagandy	2022	Kazakhstan Premier League	10	1	4	0	—		—		14	1
Career total			44	2	10	0	8	0	-	-	62	2

=== International ===
Kyrgyzstan national team
Year	Apps	Goals
2015	7	0
2016	8	0
2017	3	0
2018	9	0
2019	11	1
2020	0	0
2021	6	1
2022	5	0
Total	48	2

Statistics accurate as of match played 14 June 2022

=== International goals ===
Scores and results list Kyrgyzstan's goal tally first.

No.	Date	Venue	Opponent	Score	Result	Competition
1.	9 November 2019	Pakhtakor Central Stadium, Tashkent, Uzbekistan	Uzbekistan	1–1	1–3	Friendly
2.	11 June 2021	Yanmar Stadium Nagai, Osaka, Japan	Myanmar	3–0	8–1	2022 FIFA World Cup qualification

== Honours ==
Dordoi Bishkek

- Kyrgyz Premier League (3): 2018, 2019, 2020
- Kyrgyzstan Cup (1): 2018
- Kyrgyzstan Super Cup (2): 2019, 2021
