= Suyuntbek Mamyraliyev =

Bahraini footballer

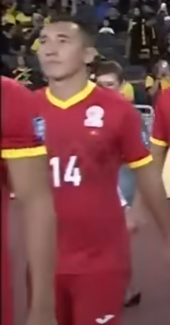

Personal information
- Full name: Suyuntbek Avuakirovich Mamyraliyev
- Date of birth: 7 January 1998 (age 28)
- Place of birth: Bishkek, Kyrgyzstan
- Height: 1.72 m (5 ft 8 in)
- Position: Left-back

Team information
- Current team: Dordoi Bishkek
- Number: 17

Youth career
- 2011–2014: Dordoi Bishkek
- 2014–2016: Ala-Too Naryn

Senior career*
| Years | Team | Apps | (Gls) |
| 2016–2017 | Ala-Too Naryn | | |
| 2017–2019 | Dordoi Bishkek | | |
| 2019–2020 | Ilbirs Bishkek | | |
| 2020–2021 | Alga Bishkek | 14 | (0) |
| 2021–2022 | Alay | 19 | (1) |
| 2022– | Dordoi Bishkek | 50 | (1) |

International career^{‡}
| 2023– | Kyrgyzstan | 11 | (0) |
- * Club domestic league appearances and goals as of 04:45, 3 February 2024 (UTC) ‡ National team caps and goals as of 04:45, 3 February 2024 (UTC)

Suyuntbek Avuakirovich Mamyraliyev (Kyrgyz: Сүйүнтбек Мамыралиев; Russian: Суйунтбек Авуакирович Мамыралиев; born 7 January 1998) is a Kyrgyz footballer who plays as a left-back for Dordoi Bishkek and the Kyrgyzstan national team.

== Club career ==
Mamyraliyev is a youth product of Dordoi Bishkek since 2011, before moving to Ala-Too Naryn's youth side in 2014. He began his senior career with Ala-Too Nary in the Kyrgyz Premier League in 2016. In 2017, he returned to Dordoi where he won the 2018 Kyrgyzstan League and 2018 Kyrgyzstan Cup. The following season, he moved to Ilbirs Bishkek, and followed that up with year-long stints at Alga Bishkek and Alay. In 2022, he once more returned to Dordoi helped them win the 2022 Kyrgyzstan Super Cup.

== International career ==
Mamyraliyev made his international debut with the Kyrgyzstan national team in a 1–1 friendly tie with Myanmar on 25 March 2023. He was called up to the national team for the 2023 AFC Asian Cup.

== Honours ==
Dordoi Bishkek

- Kyrgyz Premier League: 2018
- Kyrgyzstan Cup: 2018
- Kyrgyzstan Super Cup: 2022
