= Ruslan Sydykov =

Kyrgyzstani footballer

Personal information
- Full name: Ruslan Dzhumbayevich Sydykov
- Date of birth: 4 January 1975 (age 51)
- Place of birth: Soviet Union
- Height: 1.90 m (6 ft 3 in)
- Position: Defender

Senior career*
Years	Team	Apps	(Gls)
1992–1995	Alay Osh	75	(2)
1995–1997	Alay Gul'cha	17	(0)
1997–2000	Dinamo Bishkek	63	(2)
2001	Dordoi-Dynamo Naryn	26	(1)
2001–2002	Hindustan Aeronautics Limited		
2002	Dordoi-Dynamo Naryn	15	(0)
2002–2003	Hindustan Aeronautics Limited		
2003–2013	Dordoi Bishkek		

International career^{‡}
1997–2013	Kyrgyzstan	43	(1)

Managerial career
- 2015–2016: Ala-Too Naryn
- 2016: Dordoi Bishkek (assistant)
- 2016–: Dordoi Bishkek (caretaker)
- * Club domestic league appearances and goals as of 30 October 2015 ‡ National team caps and goals as of 30 October 2015

Ruslan Dzhumbayevich Sydykov (Tatar: Руслан Җомабай улы Ситдыйков, romanized: Ruslan Comabay ulı Sitdıyqof, Russian Руслан Джумбаевич Сыдыков), born in a Tatar family on 4 January 1975, is a former Kyrgyzstani footballer who played as a defender for Dordoi Bishkek. He was a member of the Kyrgyzstan national football team. Sydykov won the Kyrgyzstan footballer of the year in 2005 and 2006.

== Career ==
=== Club ===
Sydykov retired from football at the end of the 2014 season.

=== Managerial ===
In November 2015, Sydykov was appointed as manager of Ala-Too Naryn.

On 6 June 2016, Sydykov replaced Anarbek Ormombekov as manager of Dordoi Bishkek, having previously been his assistant, until the end of the season.

== Career statistics ==
=== International ===
Kyrgyzstan national team
Year	Apps	Goals
1997	4	0
1998	0	0
1999	1	0
2000	2	0
2001	6	0
2002	0	0
2003	2	0
2004	7	0
2005	0	0
2006	7	0
2007	2	0
2008	3	1
2009	2	0
2010	0	0
2011	2	0
2012	0	0
2013	5	0
Total	43	1

Statistics accurate as of match played 14 June 2013

=== Goals for Senior National Team ===
#	Date	Venue	Opponent	Score	Result	Competition
1.	9 May 2008	Spartak Stadium, Bishkek, Kyrgyzstan	Bangladesh	2–1	Won	2008 AFC Challenge Cup qualifying
