= Kayrat Zhyrgalbek uulu =

Kyrgyzstani footballer

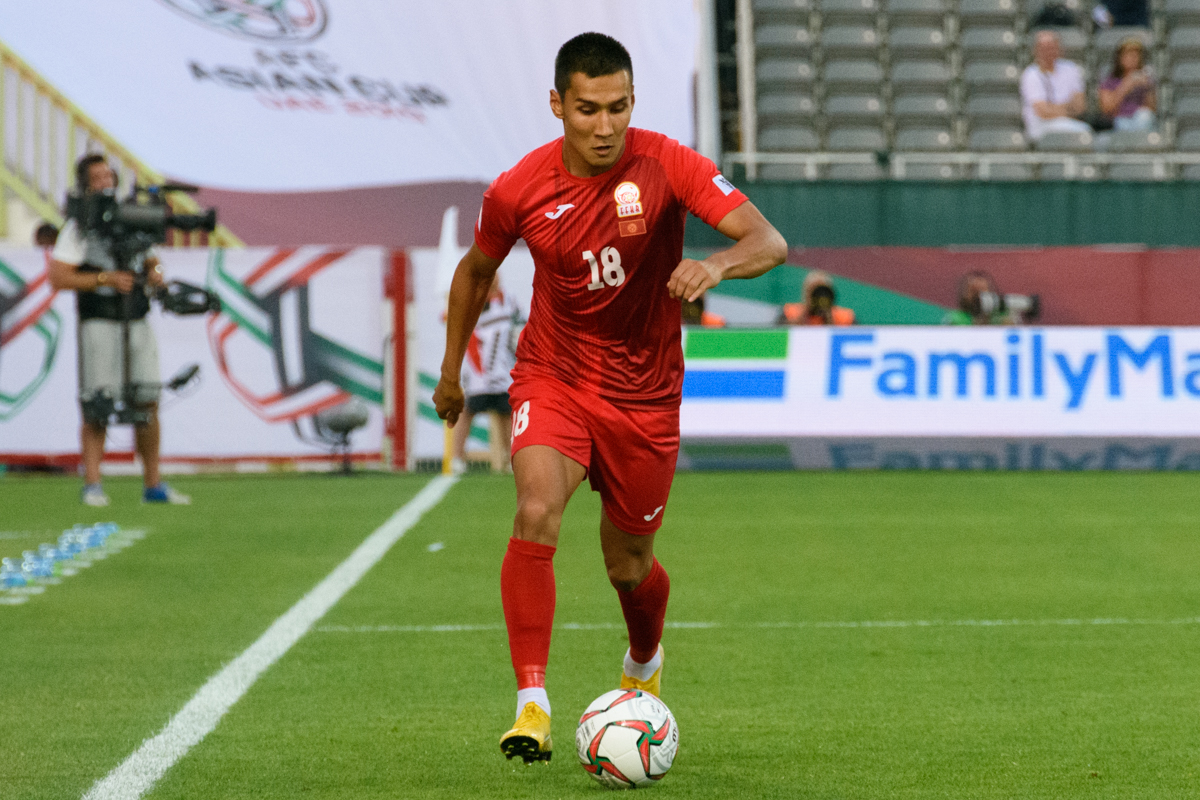
- Zhyrgalbek uulu with Kyrgyzstan in 2019

Personal information
- Full name: Kayrat Zhyrgalbek uulu
- Date of birth: 13 June 1993 (age 33)
- Place of birth: Bishkek, Kyrgyzstan
- Height: 1.78 m (5 ft 10 in)
- Position: Midfielder

Team information
- Current team: Bars Issyk-Kul
- Number: 20

Senior career*
Years	Team	Apps	(Gls)
2012–2014	Abdish-Ata		(12)
2014–2021	Dordoi Bishkek		(38)
2022–2023	Aksu	38	(0)
2023–2024	Abdish-Ata	8	(0)
2025–	Bars Issyk-Kul	26	(8)

International career^{‡}
2013–	Kyrgyzstan	86	(5)
- * Club domestic league appearances and goals ‡ National team caps and goals as of 14 November 2026

Kayrat Zhyrgalbek uulu (Kyrgyz: Кайрат Жыргалбек уулу; Russian: Кайрат Жыргалбек уулу; born 13 June 1993) is a Kyrgyz professional footballer who plays as a midfielder for Bars Issyk-Kul and the Kyrgyzstan national team.

== Career ==
In February 2019, Zhyrgalbek uulu went on trial with SKA-Khabarovsk.

== Career statistics ==
As of match played 14 November 2026

Appearances and goals by national team and year
National team	Year	Apps	Goals
Kyrgyzstan	2013	2	0
Kyrgyzstan	2014	7	1
Kyrgyzstan	2015	1	0
Kyrgyzstan	2016	7	0
Kyrgyzstan	2017	4	0
Kyrgyzstan	2018	9	1
Kyrgyzstan	2019	10	0
Kyrgyzstan	2020	0	0
Kyrgyzstan	2021	6	0
Kyrgyzstan	2022	6	0
Kyrgyzstan	2023	12	2
Kyrgyzstan	2024	10	0
Kyrgyzstan	2025	6	0
Kyrgyzstan	2026	4	1
Total		86	5

Scores and results list Kyrgyzstan's goal tally first, score column indicates score after each Zhyrgalbek uulu goal.

List of international goals scored by Kayrat Zhyrgalbek uulu
No.	Date	Venue	Opponent	Score	Result	Competition
1	5 September 2014	Astana Arena, Astana, Kazakhstan	Kazakhstan	1–5	1–7	Friendly
2	10 September 2018	Dolen Omurzakov Stadium, Bishkek, Kyrgyzstan	Syria	1–0	2–1	Friendly
3	25 March 2023	Khuman Lampak Main Stadium, Imphal, India	Myanmar	1–1	1–1	2023 Tri-Nation Series
4	16 November 2023	Bukit Jalil National Stadium, Kuala Lumpur, Malaysia	Malaysia	1–1	3–4	2026 FIFA World Cup qualification
5	14 November 2026	Thiên Trường Stadium, Ninh Bình, Vietnam	Chinese Taipei	1–0	3–0	2026 Casper Cup

== Honours ==
Dordoi Bishkek

- Kyrgyz Premier League: 2018, 2019, 2020
- Kyrgyzstan Cup: 2018
