= Aleksandr Krestinin =

Russian footballer and manager

Alexander Krestinin
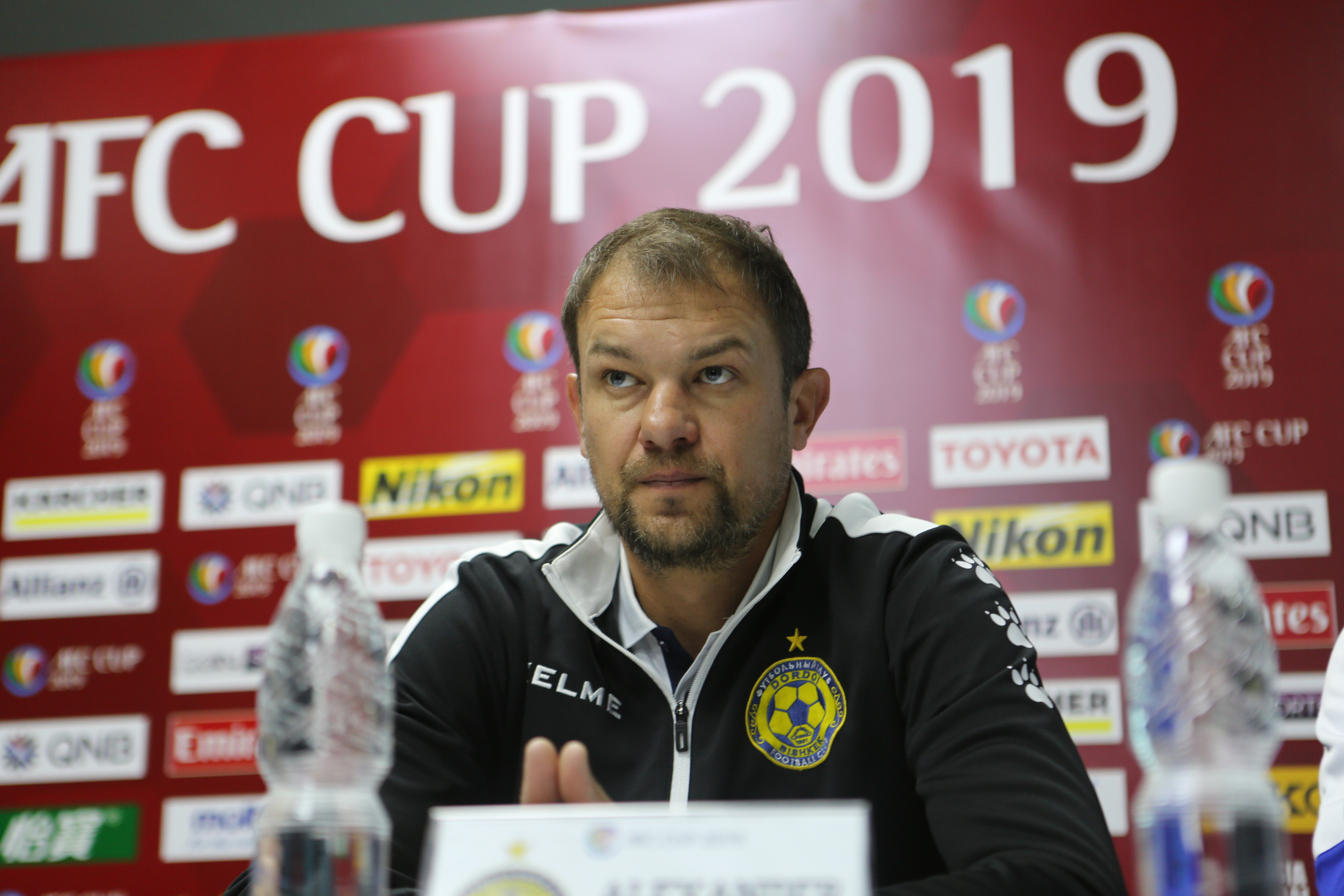
- Krestinin with Dordoi Bishkek on press-conference, 2019

Personal information
- Full name: Alexander Sergeyevich Krestinin
- Date of birth: 19 September 1978 (age 48)
- Place of birth: Krasnodar, RSFSR, Soviet Union
- Height: 1.84 m (6 ft 1/2 in)
- Position: Defender

Team information
- Current team: Bars Issyk-Kul (manager)

Senior career*
Years	Team	Apps	(Gls)
1995–1996	FC Kolos Krasnodar	1	(0)
1997	FC Rostselmash-d	0	(0)
1997—1998	FC Kuban Krasnodar	23	(2)
1999	FC Krasnoznamensk	36	(0)
2000	FC Gazovik Orenburg	20	(1)
2001	FC Caspiy		
2002	FC Spartak Tambov	18	(0)
2003	FC Reutov	12	(1)
2003	FC Don Novomoskovsk	9	(1)
2004	FC Yassy-Sayram	8	(0)
2004	FC Nara-ShBFR Naro-Fominsk	7	(0)
2005	FC Spartak Shchyolkovo	39	(0)
2005—2006	FC Smena Komsomolsk-na-Amure	26	(1)
2007	FK Metallurg Krasnoyarsk	26	(2)
2008	FC Neftchi Kochkor-Ata		

International career
1995–1996	Russia U19		

Managerial career
- 2010–2011: Neftchi Kochkor-Ata
- 2014–2023: Kyrgyzstan
- 2017–2021: Dordoi Bishkek
- 2023: Bunyodkor
- 2024: Lokomotiv Tashkent
- 2024–: Bars Issyk-Kul
- * Club domestic league appearances and goals

Alexander Sergeyevich Krestinin (Russian: Александр Сергеевич Крестинин; born 19 September 1978) is a Russian football coach/manager and former professional player. He is the former coach of the Kyrgyzstan national team.

== Career ==
In 1995, he began his professional career for the FC Kolos Krasnodar as a defender. He played for FC Rostselmash-d, FC Kuban Krasnodar, FC Krasnoznamensk, FC Gazovik Orenburg, FC Caspiy, FC Spartak Tambov, FC Reutov, FC Don Novomoskovsk, FC Yassy-Sayram, FC Nara-ShBFR Naro-Fominsk, FC Spartak Shchyolkovo, FC Smena Komsomolsk-na-Amure, FK Metallurg Krasnoyarsk and FC Neftchi Kochkor-Ata.

Alexander Krestinin started his coaching career in FC Neftchi Kochkor-Ata. Since 21 October 2014 he is a coach of the Kyrgyzstan national football team.

On 2 June 2017, Krestinin was appointed as a manager of FC Dordoi Bishkek, until the end of 2018, whilst keeping his Kyrgyzstan national team job. As coach of Kyrgyzstan, the team underwent significant improvement, and Kyrgyzstan has finally qualified to the 2019 AFC Asian Cup for the first time. Krestinin was accredited for the team's success.

On 1 November 2021, Dordoi Bishkek announced that Krestinin would leave his post as Head Coach at the end of the season after 169 matches with the club.

On 3 April 2023, the Kyrgyz Football Union announced the departure of Krestinin as Kyrgyzstan Head Coach by mutual agreement.

On 7 July 2023, Krestinin was appointed as Head Coach of Uzbekistan Super League club Bunyodkor.

On 5 November 2024, Krestinin resigned as Head Coach of Lokomotiv Tashkent.

In December 2024, Krestinin was announced as the Head Coach of the new Kyrgyz Premier League club Bars Issyk-Kul.

== Honours ==
=== Managerial ===
Dordoi Bishkek

- Kyrgyz Premier League: 2018, 2019, 2020, 2021
- Kyrgyzstan Cup: 2017, 2018
- Super Cup: 2019, 2021

== Managerial statistics ==
As of match played 1 November 2024

Team	From	To	Record				
Team	From	To	G	W	D	L	Win %
FC Dordoi Bishkek	1 June 2017	1 December 2021					
Kyrgyzstan	21 October 2014	3 April 2023	61	27	10	24	44.26
Lokomotiv Tashkent		5 November 2024	13	2	3	8	15.38
Total			82	31	15	36	37.80
