= FC Kyrgyzaltyn =

Kyrgyz football club

Kyrgyzaltyn
- Full name: Football Club Kyrgyzaltyn; Кыргызалтын футбол клубу
- Founded: 1952; 74 years ago
- Ground: Manas Stadium
- Capacity: 4,000
- Manager: Vladimir Danilenko
- League: Kyrgyz Premier League
- 2025: KPL, 10th of 14
Home colours	Away colours

FC Kyrgyzaltyn (Kyrgyz: Кыргызалтын футбол клубу) is a Kyrgyz professional football club based in Kara-Balta, that competes in the Kyrgyz Premier League.

== Name history ==
- 1952: Kalininskoye
- 1958: Khimik
- 1960: Rekord
- 1961: Alga
- 1968: Khimik
- 1992: KVT Khimik
- 1997: KVT Dinamo
- 2001: Bakay
- 2003: Zhayl-Baatyr
- 2006: Kara-Balta
- 2009: Khimik
- 2011: Renamed Kara-Balta
- 2024: Renamed Kyrgyzaltyn

== Domestic history ==
Season	League									Kyrgyzstan Cup	Top goalscorer	
Season	Div.	Pos.	Pl.	W	D	L	GS	GA	P	Kyrgyzstan Cup	Name	League
2016	1st	5th	18	6	4	8	28	23	14		Roman Kovalev	10
2017	1st	6th	20	3	2	15	20	57	11	Quarterfinal		
2018	1st	7th	28	4	1	23	38	91	13	Semifinal	Urmat Abdukaimov	9
2019	1st	7th	28	5	4	19	24	66	19	Quarterfinal		
2020	1st	7th	14	0	3	11	8	30	3	Quarterfinal	Viktor Kelm	2
2021	1st	8th	28	1	5	22	19	69	8	Quarterfinal	Stanislav Gerashchenko	4

== Players ==
=== Current squad ===
As of March 2025

Note: Flags indicate national team as defined under FIFA eligibility rules; some limited exceptions apply. Players may hold more than one non-FIFA nationality.

No.	Pos.	Nation	Player
1	GK	KGZ	Nursultan Nusupov
2	DF	KGZ	Adilet Doolotkeldiev
3	MF	KGZ	Adil Mukhtarkulov
4	MF	KGZ	Daniel Razulov
5	DF	KGZ	Asylbek Iskakov
6	MF	KGZ	Munarbek Kuvatbekov
7	FW	JPN	Hibiki Mochizuki
8	MF	KGZ	Almaz Smatov
9	FW	RUS	Islam Alsultanov
10	FW	KGZ	Azamat Omuraliev
11	MF	KGZ	Irrakhimbek Nurmat uulu
13	DF	KGZ	Kanat Akmatov

No.	Pos.	Nation	Player
17	DF	KGZ	Daniyar Ergeshov
18	FW	JPN	Mikhael Akatsuka
19	MF	KGZ	Aybek Omurzakov
20	DF	KGZ	Farkhad Turdiev
22	MF	KGZ	Zhenishbek Sydykov
23	MF	KGZ	Nurbek Zhumadil uulu
24	FW	KGZ	Nuradil Aibekov
29	FW	KGZ	Aibek Sukenaliev
30	GK	KGZ	Vladislav Geraschenko
77	MF	KGZ	Temirlan Tilenchiev
90	MF	KGZ	Sabit Chakopov
95	DF	BIH	Ermin Imamovic
98	MF	KGZ	Ruslan Adyl
