= FC Kaganat =

Kyrgyz football club

- Full name: Football Club Kaganat Osh; Каганат Ош Футбол Клубу
- Founded: 2018; 8 years ago
- Ground: Suyumbayev Stadion
- Capacity: 12,000
- Owner: Football Academy named Asyl Momunov
- Manager: Rovshen Meredov
- League: Kyrgyz Premier League
- 2022: 6th
| Home colours | Away colours |

Football Club Kaganat Osh (Kyrgyz: Каганат Ош Футбол Клубу, romanized: Kaganat Osh Futbol Klubu) is a Kyrgyz football club based in Osh, Kyrgyzstan, founded in 2018.

== History ==
Prior to the start of the 2020 season, Akademija Osh was split into two clubs, FC Kaganat and FC Lider.

=== Domestic history ===
| Season | League | | | | | | | | | Kyrgyzstan Cup | Top goalscorer | | Manager |
| Season | Div. | Pos. | Pl. | W | D | L | GS | GA | P | Kyrgyzstan Cup | Name | League | Manager |
|---|---|---|---|---|---|---|---|---|---|---|---|---|---|
| 2018 | 1st | 8th | 28 | 4 | 0 | 24 | 30 | 92 | 12 | Round of 16 | Aziz Keldiar | 13 | Khurshit Lutfullayev |
| 2019 | 1st | 8th | 28 | 2 | 5 | 21 | 22 | 75 | 11 | | | | Khurshit Lutfullayev |
| 2020 | 1st | 6th | 14 | 4 | 3 | 7 | 17 | 24 | 15 | Quarterfinal | Maksatbek Alimov | 6 | Khakim Fuzailov; Aibek Tatanov |
| 2021 | 1st | 5th | 28 | 10 | 7 | 11 | 41 | 40 | 37 | Quarterfinal | | | Nemat Kosokov |

== Players ==
=== Current squad ===
As of 28 April 2022

Note: Flags indicate national team as defined under FIFA eligibility rules; some limited exceptions apply. Players may hold more than one non-FIFA nationality.

| No. | Pos. | Nation | Player |
|---|---|---|---|
| 1 | GK | KGZ | Aziret Ysmanaliev |
| 4 | DF | KGZ | Bekzatbek Nasirov |
| 5 | DF | UZB | Azamat Zhumabaev |
| 6 | DF | KGZ | Baktai Taalaibek uulu |
| 7 | MF | UZB | Sayidzhamol Davlatjonov |
| 8 | FW | ARM | Erik Petrosyan |
| 9 | FW | KGZ | Shohrukhbek Muratov |
| 10 | FW | KGZ | Almaz Smatov |
| 11 | MF | KGZ | Nurlan Ryspaev |
| 13 | GK | KGZ | Nursultan Nusupov |
| 14 | DF | KGZ | Zakhriddin Abdilajonov |
| 15 | DF | KGZ | Maksat Dzhakybaliev |
| 17 | DF | KGZ | Isabek Dzhuraev |
| 19 | MF | KGZ | Nursultan Toktonaliev |
| 20 | DF | KGZ | Anton Fedyunin |

| No. | Pos. | Nation | Player |
|---|---|---|---|
| 22 | GK | RUS | Aleksandr Tuaev |
| 24 | DF | KGZ | Jenishbek Mamatemin uulu |
| 33 | MF | UZB | Khasan Yuldoshev |
| 44 | MF | KGZ | Kanatbek Ismatillaev |
| 47 | MF | KGZ | Nurtilek Sulaimanov |
| 47 | MF | RUS | Vadim Loginov |
| 55 | FW | KGZ | Dastanbek Toktosunov |
| 70 | DF | UZB | Kemran Najafaliev |
| 77 | MF | NGR | David Ikpabi Candy |
| 88 | DF | BRA | Rennan Saldanha |
| 94 | MF | KGZ | Bakyt Usenov |
| 99 | FW | KGZ | Aziz Keldiyarov |
| — | MF | KGZ | Bektur Kochkonbaev |
