= 2020 Kyrgyz Premier League =

Kyrgyz Premier League
- Season: 2020
- Champions: Dordoi Bishkek
- AFC Cup: Dordoi Bishkek; Alay Osh
- Matches: 56
- Goals: 148 (2.64 per match)
- Top goalscorer: Mirlan Murzaev (10)

The 2020 Kyrgyz Premier League (Kyrgyz: 2020 Кыргыз Премьер Лигасы, 2020 Keurgeuz Premjer Ligaseu) was the 29th season of the Kyrgyzstan League, Kyrgyzstan's top division of association football organized by the Football Federation of Kyrgyz Republic. The season started in March 2020, with nine teams participating.

== Teams ==
Prior to the start of the season, Akademija Osh was split into two clubs, FC Kaganat and FC Lider.

Locations of teams in the 2020 Kyrgyz Premier League

Note: Table lists in alphabetical order.

Team	Location	Venue	Capacity	Manager	Captain
Abdysh-Ata Kant	Kant	Stadion Sportkompleks Abdysh-Ata	3,000		
Alay Osh	Osh	Suyumbayev Stadion	11,200	Bakitbek Mamatov	
Alga Bishkek	Bishkek	Dolen Omurzakov Stadium	23,000		
Dordoi Bishkek	Bishkek	Dolen Omurzakov Stadium	23,000	Aleksandr Krestinin	
Ilbirs Bishkek	Bishkek	Stadium FC FFKR	1,000		
Kaganat	Osh	Suyumbayev Stadion	11,200	(Kyrgyzstan) Aibek Tatanov	
Kara-Balta	Kara-Balta	Manas Stadium	4,000		
Lider-Chempion Ysyq-Köl	Ysyq-Köl Region				
Neftchi	Kochkor-Ata	Stadion Neftyannik Kochkor-Ata	5,000		

== Foreign players ==
The number of foreign players is restricted to five per USL team. A team can use only five foreign players on the field in each game.

Club	Player 1	Player 2	Player 3	Player 4	AFC players
Abdysh-Ata Kant	(Ghana) Ayew	(Turkmenistan) Ata Geldiýew	(Turkmenistan) Rahat Japarow		
Alay Osh	(Ghana) Joel Kojo	(Ghana) Inkum	(Ukraine) Proshitsin	(Uzbekistan) D.Abdurakhmanov	(Uzbekistan) Temur Talipov
Alga Bishkek	(Ivory Coast) Ble Botty				
Dordoi Bishkek	(Bulgaria) Georgi Radev				(Uzbekistan) Sirojiddin Allayev
Ilbirs Bishkek					
Kaganat	(Ukraine) Lyashenko	(Ukraine) Mykhaylo Udod	(Ukraine) Melinyshyn	(Tajikistan) Maladustov	(Tajikistan) Karaev
Kara-Balta	(Uzbekistan) Akhmedov				
Lider-Chempion Ysyq-Köl	(Cameroon) Mbala Bomba	(Uzbekistan) Khoshimov	(Uzbekistan) Sultanov	(Uzbekistan) Soibov	(Uzbekistan) Rakhimov
Neftchi	(Afghanistan) Amredin Sharifi	(Ghana) Opoku Eboah	(Moldova) Mikhal Payush	(Ukraine) Ignatienko	(Uzbekistan) Abdullayev

== League table ==
Pos	Team	Pld	W	D	L	GF	GA	GD	Pts	Qualification or relegation
1	Dordoi Bishkek	14	11	2	1	38	9	+29	35	Qualification for AFC Cup group stage
2	Alga Bishkek	14	9	2	3	15	12	+3	29	
3	FC Neftchi Kochkor-Ata	14	9	1	4	27	15	+12	28	
4	Abdysh-Ata Kant	14	6	5	3	21	17	+4	23	
5	Alay Osh	14	7	2	5	16	12	+4	23	Qualification for AFC Cup group stage
6	Kaganat	14	4	3	7	17	24	−7	15	
7	Kara-Balta	14	0	3	11	8	30	−22	3	
8	Ilbirs Bishkek	14	0	2	12	6	29	−23	2	
9	Lider-Chempion Ysyq-Köl	0	0	0	0	0	0	0	0	Withdrawn

Updated to match(es) played on 1 October 2020. Source: KPL
Rules for classification: 1) Points; 2) Head-to-head points; 3) Head-to-head goal difference; 4) Head-to-head goals scored; 5) Goal difference; 6) Goals scored.

== Results ==
Home \ Away	ABD	ALA	ALG	DOR	ILB	KAG	KAR	NEF
Abdysh-Ata Kant	—	0–0	1–0	2–2	2–0	3–1	2–0	1–5
Alay Osh	1–1	—	0–1	0–2	1–0	2–0	1–0	0–1
Alga Bishkek	0–0	2–1	—	1–5	1–0	2–1	2–1	1–0
Dordoi Bishkek	4–2	1–0	2–0	—	6–1	8–1	4–0	2–1
Ilbirs Bishkek	0–1	1–2	1–3	0–1	—	0–1	1–1	1–4
Kaganat Osh	1–0	0–1	0–0	0–0	5–1	—	3–1	1–2
FC Kara-Balta	1–4	1–3	0–1	0–1	0–0	2–2	—	0–3
Neftchi Kochkor-Ata	2–2	2–4	0–1	1–0	1–0	2–1	3–1	—

Updated to match(es) played on 1 October 2020. Source: Flashscore
Legend: Blue = home team win; Yellow = draw; Red = away team win.

== Top scorers ==
Player	Club	Goals
(Kyrgyzstan) Mirlan Murzaev	Dordoi Bishkek	10
(Ghana) Joel Kojo	Alay Osh	7
(Kyrgyzstan) Maksat Alygulov	Abdysh-Ata Kant	7
(Kyrgyzstan) Bekzhan Sagynbaev	Dordoi Bishkek	6
(Kyrgyzstan) Maksatbek Alimov	FC Kaganat	6
(Kyrgyzstan) Eldar Moldozhunusov	Neftchi Kochkor-Ata	6
(Kyrgyzstan) Ernist Batyrkanov	Dordoi Bishkek	5
(Kyrgyzstan) Farkhat Musabekov	Dordoi Bishkek	4
(Uzbekistan) Temur Tolipov	Alay Osh	3
(Kyrgyzstan) Kayrat Zhyrgalbek uulu	Dordoi Bishkek	3
(Afghanistan) Amiruddin Sharifi	Neftchi Kochkor-Ata	3
(Kyrgyzstan) Atay Dzhumashev	FC Kaganat	3
(Kyrgyzstan) Temirbolot Tapaev	Alga Bishkek	3
(Kyrgyzstan) Chyngyz Idrisov	Alga Bishkek	3
(Kyrgyzstan) Akram Umarov	Neftchi Kochkor-Ata	3
(Kyrgyzstan) Viktor Kelm	Fk Kara-Balta	2
(Armenia) Orbeli Hambardzumyan	Abdysh-Ata Kant	2
(Belarus) Maksim Shilo	Dordoi Bishkek	2
(Kyrgyzstan) Umidillo Iminov	Neftchi Kochkor-Ata	2
(Turkmenistan) Ata Geldiyev	Abdysh-Ata Kant	2
(Kyrgyzstan) Amanzhan Zhanybek uulu	Ilbirs Bishkek	2
