= 2021 Kyrgyz Premier League =

Kyrgyz Premier League
- Season: 2021
- Dates: 16 March – 6 November
- Champions: Dordoi Bishkek
- AFC Cup: Dordoi Bishkek
- Matches: 108
- Goals: 314 (2.91 per match)
- Top goalscorer: Mirbek Akhmataliev (17 goals)
- Biggest home win: Dordoi Bishkek 4–0 Kara-Balta (19 March 2021); Alay Osh 5–1 Kara-Balta (30 July 2021)
- Biggest away win: Alay Osh 0–4 Abdysh-Ata Kant (19 March 2021); Kara-Balta 2–6 Abdysh-Ata Kant (21 August 2021)
- Highest scoring: Kara-Balta 2–6 Abdysh-Ata Kant (21 August 2021)
- Longest winning run: 5 matches Alga Bishkek
- Longest unbeaten run: 12 matches Dordoi Bishkek
- Longest winless run: 12 matches Kara-Balta
- Longest losing run: 6 matches Ilbirs Bishkek
- All statistics correct as of 26 October 2021.

The 2021 Kyrgyz Premier League was the 30th season of the Kyrgyzstan League, Kyrgyzstan's top division of association football organized by the Football Federation of Kyrgyz Republic. The season started on 16 March 2021, with eight teams participating, and ended on 6 November 2021.

== Teams ==
=== Team overview ===
Locations of teams in the 2021 Kyrgyz Premier League

Note: Table lists in alphabetical order.

Team	Location	Venue	Capacity
Abdysh-Ata Kant	Kant	Stadion Sportkompleks Abdysh-Ata	3,000
Alay Osh	Osh	Suyumbayev Stadion	11,200
Alga Bishkek	Bishkek	Dolen Omurzakov Stadium	23,000
Dordoi Bishkek	Bishkek	Dolen Omurzakov Stadium	23,000
Ilbirs Bishkek	Bishkek	Stadium FC FFKR	1,000
Kaganat	Osh	Suyumbayev Stadion	11,200
Kara-Balta	Kara-Balta	Manas Stadium	4,000
Neftchi	Kochkor-Ata	Stadion Neftyannik Kochkor-Ata	5,000

=== Personnel and kits ===
Note: Flags indicate national team as has been defined under FIFA eligibility rules. Players and Managers may hold more than one non-FIFA nationality.

Team	Manager	Captain	Kit manufacturer	Shirt sponsor
Abdysh-Ata Kant	(Netherlands) Ceylan Arıkan	(Kyrgyzstan) Davliatzhan Baratov	HaWe	Nitro
Alay Osh	(Tajikistan) Numonjon Yusupov		(Spain) Joma	
Alga Bishkek	(Kyrgyzstan) Valeriy Berezovskiy	(Kyrgyzstan) Veniamin Shumeyko	(Spain) Joma	
Dordoi Bishkek	(Russia) Aleksandr Krestinin	(Kyrgyzstan) Mirlan Murzaev	(United States) Nike	
Ilbirs Bishkek	(Russia) Maksim Lisitsyn		(Spain) Joma	
Kaganat	(Kyrgyzstan) Nemat Kosokov		(Spain) Joma	Kaganat Invest (Home); Kyrgyz Unaa Kurulus (Away)
Kara-Balta	(Kyrgyzstan) Vladimir Danilenko		(Kyrgyzstan) Bigser Sport	
Neftchi	(Kyrgyzstan) Nematzhan Zakirov		(Spain) Joma	

== Foreign players ==
The number of foreign players is restricted to five per Kyrgyz Premier League team. A team can use only five foreign players on the field in each game.

Club	Player 1	Player 2	Player 3	Player 4	Player 5	Player 6	Player 7	AFC Players	Former Players
Abdysh-Ata Kant	(Belarus) Vladislav Kabachevskiy	(Russia) Erbol Atabaev	(Ukraine) Kyrylo Protsyshyn	(Uzbekistan) Dadakhon Yusupov					(Kazakhstan) Irisdavlat Khakimov
Alay Osh	(Ghana) Emmanuel Yaghr	(Kazakhstan) Azamat Zhomartov	(Russia) Alisher Mirzoev	(Tunisia) Tijani Belaïd	(Uzbekistan) Idris Bikmaykin	(Uzbekistan) Jamshid Kobulov	(Uzbekistan) Timur Talipov	(Uzbekistan) Sanzhar Turakulov	(Russia) Danil Polyakov (Tajikistan) Oybek Abdugafforov
Alga Bishkek	(Kazakhstan) Irisdavlat Khakimov	(Nigeria) Oluwaseun Aleriwa	(Russia) Andrei Zorin						(Ghana) Kelvin Inkoom
Dordoi Bishkek	(Belarus) Maksim Shilo	(Ghana) Armah Emmanuel	(Ghana) Joel Kojo	(Kazakhstan) Magamed Uzdenov	(Russia) Aleksandr Bachevskiy	(Russia) Kirill Krestinin	(Serbia) Nikola Petković		(Russia) Andrey Shipilov
Ilbirs Bishkek									
Kaganat	(Ghana) Kelvin Inkoom	(Russia) Aziz Keldiyarov	(Russia) Timur Koblov	(Uzbekistan) Sherzodbek Abduraimov	(Uzbekistan) Rashidov Dostonjon	(Tajikistan) Oyatullo Safarov	(Uzbekistan) Sardor Jakhonov		(Uzbekistan) Timur Talipov (Uzbekistan) Jamshid Kobulov
Kara-Balta	(Kazakhstan) Akzhol Kanal	(Kazakhstan) Rakhat Kanat	(Kazakhstan) Joseph Papengut						
Neftchi	(Afghanistan) Amredin Sharifi	(Mali) Said Diabate	(Moldova) Mikhail Payush	(Russia) Mikhail Petrushchenkov	(Uzbekistan) Azamat Abdullaev	(Uzbekistan) Otabek Khaydarov			(Russia) Artyom Kulesha (Russia) Dmitri Ostrovski (Uzbekistan) Sanzhar Zokirov

== League table ==
Pos	Team	Pld	W	D	L	GF	GA	GD	Pts	Qualification or relegation
1	Dordoi Bishkek (C)	28	19	5	4	57	27	+30	62	Qualification for AFC Cup group stage
2	Abdysh-Ata Kant	28	17	8	3	66	31	+35	59	
3	Alga Bishkek	28	17	4	7	39	25	+14	55	
4	Alay Osh	28	13	7	8	45	38	+7	46	
5	Kaganat	28	10	7	11	41	40	+1	37	
6	Neftchi Kochkorata	28	9	4	15	37	44	−7	31	
7	Ilbirs Bishkek	28	5	2	21	24	54	−30	17	
8	Kara-Balta	28	1	5	22	19	69	−50	8	

Updated to match(es) played on 26 October 2021. Source: KPFL
Rules for classification: 1) Points; 2) Head-to-head points; 3) Head-to-head goal difference; 4) Head-to-head goals scored; 5) Goal difference; 6) Goals scored.
(C) Champions

== Results ==
=== Round 1–14 ===
Home \ Away	ABD	ALA	ALG	DOR	ILB	KAG	KAR	NEF
Abdysh-Ata Kant	—	1–0	1–2	1–2	3–0	2–1	1–0	2–0
Alay Osh	0–4	—	1–2	0–0	1–0	2–1	3–0	2–3
Alga Bishkek	2–2	1–0	—	0–3	2–0	1–0	3–1	2–0
Dordoi Bishkek	3–2	0–2	1–2	—	4–1	2–2	4–0	3–1
Ilbirs Bishkek	0–1	3–4	0–2	2–4	—	0–1	4–1	0–3
Kaganat	1–1	3–1	0–1	1–2	2–0	—	2–1	2–1
Kara-Balta	2–2	1–4	0–0	0–3	1–1	1–0	—	1–2
Neftchi Kochkorata	1–3	2–3	0–1	2–2	0–1	3–2	2–1	—

Updated to match(es) played on 30 June 2021. Source: Flashscore
Legend: Blue = home team win; Yellow = draw; Red = away team win.

=== Round 15–28 ===
Home \ Away	ABD	ALA	ALG	DOR	ILB	KAG	KAR	NEF
Abdysh-Ata Kant	—	2–2	4–1	2–2	3–0	5–2	5–1	1–0
Alay Osh	2–2	—	1–0	1–1	2–1	3–3	5–1	2–2
Alga Bishkek	2–2	0–1	—	1–2	2–0	0–0	4–1	3–2
Dordoi Bishkek	1–2	1–0	1–0	—	3–0	2–0	3–0	1–0
Ilbirs Bishkek	0–1	2–3	0–1	2–3	—	1–2	1–0	0–3
Kaganat	3–3	1–1	2–1	0–3	0–2	—	1–0	5–2
Kara-Balta	2–6	0–0	0–2	1–2	1–1	0–4	—	1–2
Neftchi Kochkorata	1–1	0–1	0–1	2–0	1–2	0–0	2–1	—

Updated to match(es) played on 7 November 2021. Source: Flashscore
Legend: Blue = home team win; Yellow = draw; Red = away team win.

=== By match played ===
Team ╲ Round	1	2	3	4	5	6	7	8	9	10	11	12	13	14	15	16	17	18	19	20	21	22	23	24	25	26	27	28
Abdysh-Ata Kant	W	W	W	L	L	W	W	D	D	W	W	L	W	D	D	W	W	D	W	D	D	D	W	W	W	W	D	W
Alay Osh	W	W	W	W	W	L	W	D	L	W	L	W	L	L	W	D	W	L	D	W	D	W	D	W	W	D	D	D
Alga Bishkek	W	L	L	W	W	W	D	W	D	W	W	W	W	W	W	D	L	D	W	L	W	L	L	L	L	W	W	W
Dordoi Bishkek	W	W	W	W	W	D	D	D	W	L	W	W	W	L	D	W	W	W	L	W	W	W	D	W	W	L	W	W
Ilbirs Bishkek	L	L	L	L	L	W	L	L	L	L	L	W	L	D	L	L	D	L	L	L	L	W	W	L	L	W	L	L
Kaganat	L	W	W	W	L	D	L	W	W	L	L	L	L	D	W	D	L	W	D	D	D	L	W	L	W	L	W	D
Kara-Balta	L	L	L	L	L	L	D	D	L	L	L	L	W	D	L	L	D	L	L	L	L	L	L	L	L	D	L	L
Neftchi Kochkorata	L	L	L	L	W	L	D	L	W	W	W	L	L	W	L	D	L	W	W	W	D	D	L	W	L	L	L	L

Updated to match(es) played on 7 November 2021. Source:
W = Win; D = Draw; L = Loss

== Top scorers ==
As of match played 21 October 2021

Rank	Player	Club	Goals
1	(Kyrgyzstan) Mirbek Akhmataliev	Abdysh-Ata Kant	17
2	(Kyrgyzstan) Maksat Alygulov	Abdysh-Ata Kant	13
3	(Kyrgyzstan) Atay Dzhumashev	Abdysh-Ata Kant	12
3	(Afghanistan) Amredin Sharifi	Neftchi Kochkorata	12
5	(Kyrgyzstan) Eldar Moldozhunusov	Alay Osh	8
5	(Nigeria) Aleriwa Oluwaseun	Alga Bishkek	8
5	(Ghana) Emmanuel Yaghr	Alay Osh	8
5	(Kyrgyzstan) Tursunali Rustamov	Dordoi Bishkek	8
9	(Kyrgyzstan) Mirlan Murzaev	Dordoi Bishkek	7
9	(Kyrgyzstan) Marlen Murzakhmatov	Ilbirs Bishkek	7
9	(Kyrgyzstan) Ryskeldi Artykbaev	Dordoi Bishkek	7

== Awards ==
=== Monthly awards ===
Month	Manager of the Month		Player of the Month		Goal of the Month		References
Month	Manager	Club	Player	Club	Player	Club	References
March	(Netherlands) Ceylan Arıkan	Abdysh-Ata Kant	(Kyrgyzstan) Abai Bokoleev	Dordoi Bishkek	(Kyrgyzstan) Temirbolot Tapaev	Alga Bishkek	
April							
May	(Russia) Aleksandr Krestinin	Dordoi Bishkek	(Afghanistan) Amredin Sharifi	Neftchi Kochkor-Ata	(Kyrgyzstan) Nursultan Abdurakhmanov	Neftchi Kochkor-Ata	
June							
