= 2008 Kyrgyzstan League =

Kyrgyzstan League
- Season: 2008
- Champions: Abdish-Ata Kant

Statistics of Kyrgyzstan League for the 2008 season.

== Overview ==
It was contested by 9 teams, and Dordoi-Dynamo Naryn won the championship after beating Abdish-Ata Kant in an end of season playoff final after both sides had the same number of points in the regular season.

== Final league standings ==
Pos	Team	Pld	W	D	L	GF	GA	GD	Pts
1	Abdish-Ata Kant	16	12	3	1	48	5	+43	39 (Note: Dordoi-Dynamo Naryn beat Abdish-Ata Kant 1-0 in the final playoff.)
2	Dordoi-Dynamo Naryn	16	12	3	1	34	5	+29	39
3	Alay Osh	16	9	2	5	22	16	+6	29
4	FC Neftchi Kochkor-Ata	16	9	1	6	32	22	+10	28
5	Sher-Ak-Dan Bishkek	16	7	2	7	29	24	+5	23
6	Zhashtyk Ak Altyn Kara-Suu	16	5	5	6	18	20	−2	20
7	Kant-77	16	4	5	7	20	28	−8	17
8	Dordoi-Plaza	16	2	1	13	12	46	−34	7
9	Abdish Ata 91 Kant	16	1	0	15	10	59	−49	3

Source: rsssf.com
