= Sergey Dvoryankov =

Russian professional football manager

Personal information
- Full name: Sergey Aleksandrovich Dvoryankov
- Date of birth: 12 December 1969 (age 56)
- Place of birth: Moscow, USSR

Managerial career
- Years: Team
- 2008–2013: FC Dordoi Bishkek
- 2012–2014: Kyrgyzstan

Sergey Aleksandrovich Dvoryankov (Russian: Сергей Александрович Дворянков; born 12 December 1969) is a Russian professional football manager.

== Career ==
He began his coaching career in the FC Dordoi Bishkek. Since 15 September 2012 until 31 May 2014 he was a coach of the Kyrgyzstan national football team.
