= Alisher Mirzoev =

Tajikistani footballer

Personal information
- Date of birth: 22 June 1998 (age 28)
- Place of birth: Tajikistan
- Height: 1.72 m (5 ft 8 in)
- Position: Midfielder

Youth career
- –2018: Istiklol

Senior career*
Years	Team	Apps	(Gls)
2018–2019	Speranța Nisporeni	33	(2)
2020–2021	Zenit Penza		
2021–2022	Alay Osh	24	(0)
2022–2023	Aluston-YUBK		
2023–2024	SKA Rostov-on-Don	26	(3)
- * Club domestic league appearances and goals as of 25 November 2023

Alisher Mirzoev (born 22 June 1998) is a Tajik professional footballer who plays as a midfielder. He also holds Russian citizenship (as Russian: Алишер Абдухамидович Мирзоев).

== Career ==
Prior to the 2021 Kyrgyz Premier League season, Mirzoev was registered by Alay Osh.

== Career statistics ==
=== Club ===
As of match played 9 November 2019.

Club	Season	League			Cup		Continental		Other		Total	
Club	Season	Division	Apps	Goals	Apps	Goals	Apps	Goals	Apps	Goals	Apps	Goals
Speranța Nisporeni	2018	Divizia Națională	14	1	3 (Note: Appearances in the Moldovan Cup)	0	0	0	0	0	17	1
Speranța Nisporeni	2019	Divizia Națională	19	1	1	0	1 (Note: Appearances in the UEFA Europa League)	0	0	0	21	1
Career total			33	2	4	0	1	0	0	0	38	2
