= Joel Kojo =

Kyrgyz footballer (born 1998)

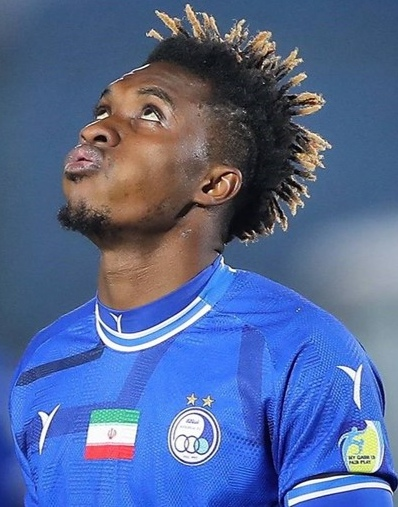
- Kojo with Esteghlal in 2025

Personal information
- Date of birth: 21 August 1998 (age 28)
- Place of birth: Accra, Ghana
- Height: 1.74 m (5 ft 9 in)
- Position: Forward

Team information
- Current team: PFC Navbahor
- Number: 28

Youth career
- KK Adonteng Stars

Senior career*
Years	Team	Apps	(Gls)
2017–2021	Alay	59	(52)
2021–2023	Dordoi Bishkek	35	(14)
2023–202‌4	Dinamo Samarqand	41	(19)
2025–2026	Esteghlal	11	(2)
2025	→ Neftchi Fergana (loan)	11	(3)
2026–	PFC Navbahor	2	(0)

International career^{‡}
2023–	Kyrgyzstan	33	(13)
- * Club domestic league appearances and goals as of 31 May 2026 ‡ National team caps and goals as of 14 November 2026

Joel Kojo (Russian: Джоэл Коджо; born 21 August 1998) is a professional footballer who plays as a forward for Uzbekistani club PFC Navbahor. Born in Ghana, he plays for the Kyrgyzstan national team.

== Club career ==
=== Alay ===
Kojo finished the 2018 season as the club's and the league's top scorer with 26 goals.

=== Dordoi Bishkek ===
On 11 January 2022, Dordoi Bishkek announced the signing of Kojo on a one-year contract.

Kojo finished the 2022 season as the club's top scorer, scoring 10 goals in the league and once in the Kyrgyzstan Super Cup. On 24 January 2023, Dordoi Bishkek announced the departure of Kojo following the expiration of his contract the previous November.

=== Dinamo Samarqand ===
On 27 February 2023, Uzbekistan Super League club Dinamo Samarqand announced the signing of Kojo on a one-year contract.

On 29 March 2023, Kojo scored a hat-trick for Dinamo Samarqand in their 3–0 victory over Navbahor Namangan-2.

=== Esteghlal ===
On 11 January 2025, Persian Gulf Pro League club Esteghlal announced the signing of Kojo. He scored his first goal for the club on 3 February during the 2024–25 AFC Champions League Elite match against Iraqi club Al Shorta in a 1–1 draw.

== International career ==
On 18 May 2023, Kojo was called up to the Kyrgyzstan national team for the first time as part of their 2023 CAFA Nations Cup squad. On 16 June 2023, Kojo made his debut for Kyrgyzstan, coming on as a 58th-minute substitute for Atay Dzhumashev in a 5–1 defeat to Iran.

On 11 September 2023, Kojo scored his first international goals in a friendly against Kuwait.

On 25 January 2024, Kojo scored the only goal for Kyrgyzstan in their 2023 AFC Asian Cup campaign in a 1–1 tie against Oman, a goal that directly killed off hopes of both his adopted country and Oman from advancing at the expense of Indonesia.

On 26 March 2024, Kojo scored his first international hat-trick during the 2026 FIFA World Cup qualification match against Chinese Taipei in a 5–1 home win.

== Personal life ==
Born in Ghana, Kojo is a Ghanaian Muslim. He was naturalized by Kyrgyzstan and joined the Kyrgyzstan national team after competing in Kyrgyzstan for an extended period of time.

== Career statistics ==
=== Club ===
As of match played 29 July 2026

Appearances and goals by club, season and competition
Club	Season	League			National cup (Note: Includes Kyrgyzstan Cup, Uzbekistan Cup, Iranian Hazfi Cup)		Continental		Total	
Club	Season	Division	Apps	Goals	Apps	Goals	Apps	Goals	Apps	Goals
Alay	2018	Kyrgyz Premier League	21	26			6 (Note: Appearances in AFC Cup)	1	27	16
Alay	2019	Kyrgyz Premier League	24	19			2	0	26	19
Alay	2020	Kyrgyz Premier League	14	7			—		14	7
Alay	Total		59	41			8	1	67	42
Dordoi Bishkek	2021	Kyrgyz Premier League	13	4			2	1	15	5
Dordoi Bishkek	2022	Kyrgyz Premier League	22	10			2	0	24	10
Dordoi Bishkek	Total		35	14			4	1	39	15
Dinamo Samarqand	2023	Uzbekistan Pro League	17	11	6	4	—		23	15
Dinamo Samarqand	2024	Uzbekistan Super League	24	8	3	3	—		27	11
Dinamo Samarqand	Total		41	19	9	7	—		50	26
Esteghlal	2024–25	Persian Gulf Pro League	11	2	3	0	3 (Note: Appearances in AFC Champions League Elite)	1	17	3
Neftchi Fergana	2025	Uzbekistan Super League	11	3	0	0	—		11	3
Navbahor Namangan	2026	Uzbekistan Super League	2	0	0	0	—		2	0
Career total			159	79	12	7	15	3	186	89

=== International ===
As of match played 14 November 2026

Appearances and goals by national team and year
National team	Year	Apps	Goals
Kyrgyzstan	2023	9	2
Kyrgyzstan	2024	14	8
Kyrgyzstan	2025	7	1
Kyrgyzstan	2026	3	2
Total		33	13

Scores and results list Kyrgyzstan's goal tally first, score column indicates score after each Kojo goal.

List of international goals scored by Joel Kojo
No.	Date	Venue	Opponent	Score	Result	Competition
1	11 September 2023	The Sevens Stadium, Dubai, United Arab Emirates	Kuwait	2–1	3–1	Friendly
2	11 September 2023	The Sevens Stadium, Dubai, United Arab Emirates	Kuwait	3–1	3–1	Friendly
3	9 January 2024	Al Egla Training Facility, Doha, Qatar	Vietnam	1–0	2–1	Friendly
4	25 January 2024	Abdullah bin Khalifa Stadium, Doha, Qatar	Oman	1–1	1–1	2023 AFC Asian Cup
5	26 March 2024	Dolen Omurzakov Stadium, Bishkek, Kyrgyzstan	Chinese Taipei	1–0	5–1	2026 FIFA World Cup qualification
6	26 March 2024	Dolen Omurzakov Stadium, Bishkek, Kyrgyzstan	Chinese Taipei	2–0	5–1	2026 FIFA World Cup qualification
7	26 March 2024	Dolen Omurzakov Stadium, Bishkek, Kyrgyzstan	Chinese Taipei	3–0	5–1	2026 FIFA World Cup qualification
8	10 September 2024	Dolen Omurzakov Stadium, Bishkek, Kyrgyzstan	Uzbekistan	1–0	2–3	2026 FIFA World Cup qualification
9	19 November 2024	Dolen Omurzakov Stadium, Bishkek, Kyrgyzstan	Iran	1–2	2–3	2026 FIFA World Cup qualification
10	19 November 2024	Dolen Omurzakov Stadium, Bishkek, Kyrgyzstan	Iran	2–2	2–3	2026 FIFA World Cup qualification
11	30 August 2025	JAR Stadium, Tashkent, Uzbekistan	Turkmenistan	1–1	1–1	2025 CAFA Nations Cup
12	28 September 2026	Dolen Omurzakov Stadium, Bishkek, Kyrgyzstan	Maldives	5–0	5–0	Friendly
13	14 November 2026	Thiên Trường Stadium, Ninh Bình, Vietnam	Chinese Taipei	2–0	3–0	2026 Casper Cup

== Honours ==
Alay

- Kyrgyzstan Cup: 2020
- Kyrgyzstan Super Cup: 2018

Dordoi Bishkek

- Kyrgyz Premier League: 2021
- Kyrgyzstan Super Cup: 2021, 2022

Esteghlal

- Iranian Hazfi Cup: 2024–25

Neftchi Fergana

- Uzbekistan Super League: 2025

Individual

- Kyrgyz Premier League top scorer: 2018
- KFU Footballer of the Year: 2024
