= Anarbek Ormombekov =

Kyrgyzstani footballer and coach

Anarbek Ormonbekov
Personal information
- Full name: Anarbek Ormombekov
- Date of birth: 17 May 1971 (age 55)
- Place of birth: Kirghiz SSR, Soviet Union

Senior career*
| Years | Team | Apps | (Gls) |
- Manas Talas
- SKIF Bishkek

Managerial career
- Kyrgyzstan U-21
- Kant-77
- –2008: Dordoi-Dynamo (assistant)
- 2009–2011: Kyrgyzstan
- 2015–2016: Dordoi Bishkek
- * Club domestic league appearances and goals

Anarbek Ormonbekov (Russian: Анарбек Дарданович Ормомбеков; born 17 May 1971 in Kochkor-Ata) is a Kyrgyzstani professional footballer and football coach. He played as midfielder. He started his coaching career in 2001. In 2009, he became the head of Kyrgyzstan national football team.

== Career ==
=== Managerial ===
Ormonbekov was appointed as the new manager of Dordoi Bishkek in November 2015. On 6 June 2016, Ormonbekov was fired as manager of Dordoi Bishkek due to poor results.
