= FC Dordoi Bishkek =

Association football club in Bishkek, Kyrgyzstan

Dordoi
- Full name: Football Club Dordoi
- Nicknames: Дордойчулар; Сары-көктөр (Yellow-blue)
- Founded: 1997; 29 years ago
- Ground: Stadion Dordoi; Bishkek, Kyrgyzstan
- Capacity: 3,000
- Owner: Askar Salymbekov
- Manager: Vadim Skripchenko
- League: Kyrgyz Premier League
- 2025: KPL, 4th of 14
- Website: fc-dordoi.kg
Home colours	Away colours	Third colours

Football Club Dordoi Bishkek (Kyrgyz: Дордой Бишкек Футбол Клубу) is a Kyrgyz professional football club based in Bishkek, that competes in the Kyrgyz Premier League. Founded in 1997, the club is owned by "Dordoi" Association, the group of companies that also own Dordoi Bazaar in Bishkek.

== History ==
The club was founded in 1997. Dordoi appointed Anarbek Ormombekov as their new manager in November 2015, firing him on 6 June 2016, due to poor results, with Ruslan Sydykov being appointed as manager until the end of the season. On 18 August 2016, Murat Dzhumakeev was appointed as acting head coach for Dordoi Bishkek's 2017 AFC Cup qualifiers, due to Ruslan Sydykov not having the required coaching qualifications for AFC competitions.

On 2 June 2017, Aleksandr Krestinin was appointed as the club's new manager until the end of 2018. After victory in the Premier League and League Cup in 2018, Dordoi extended their agreement with Krestinin till end of 2020.

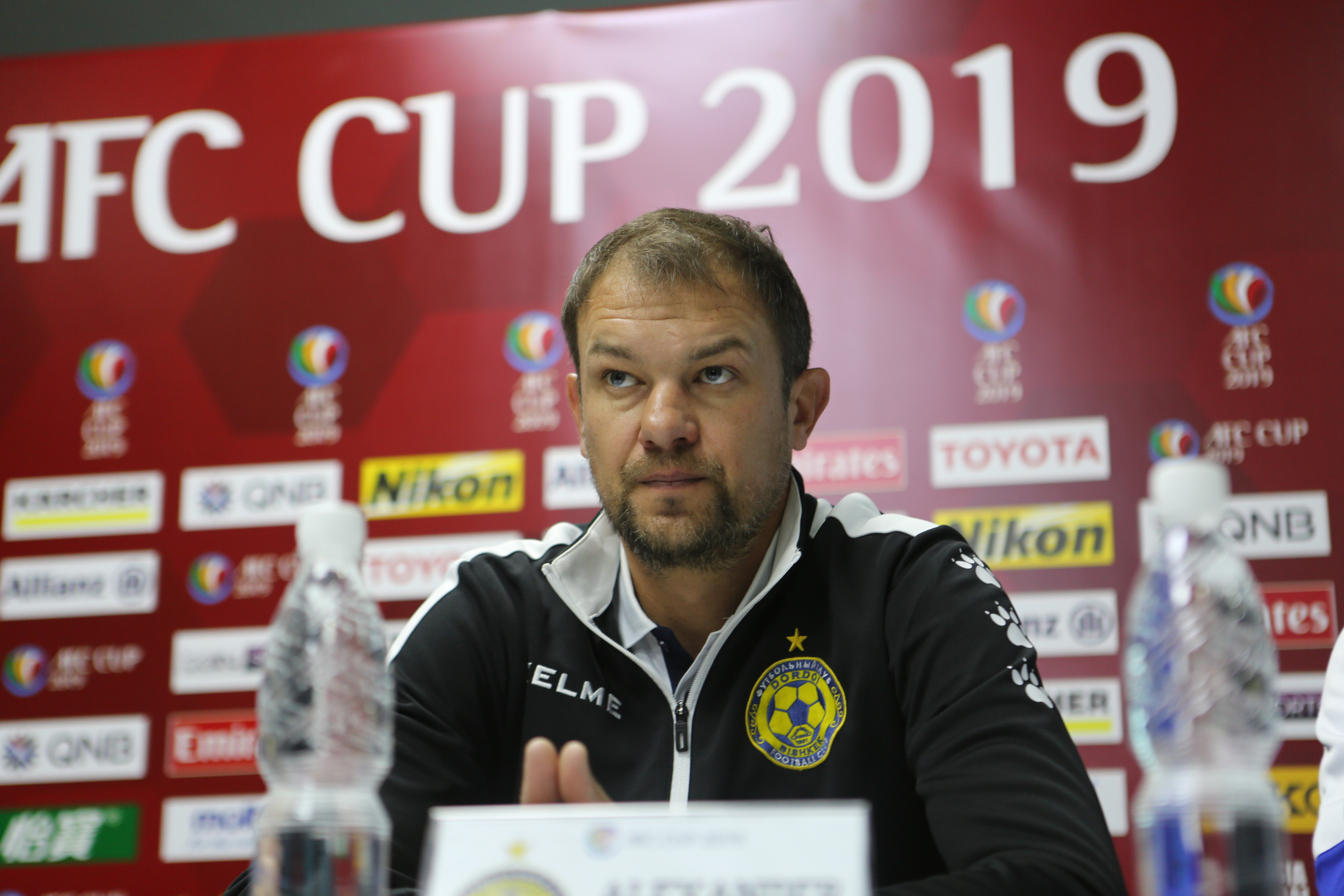
Alexander Krestinin at a press-conference

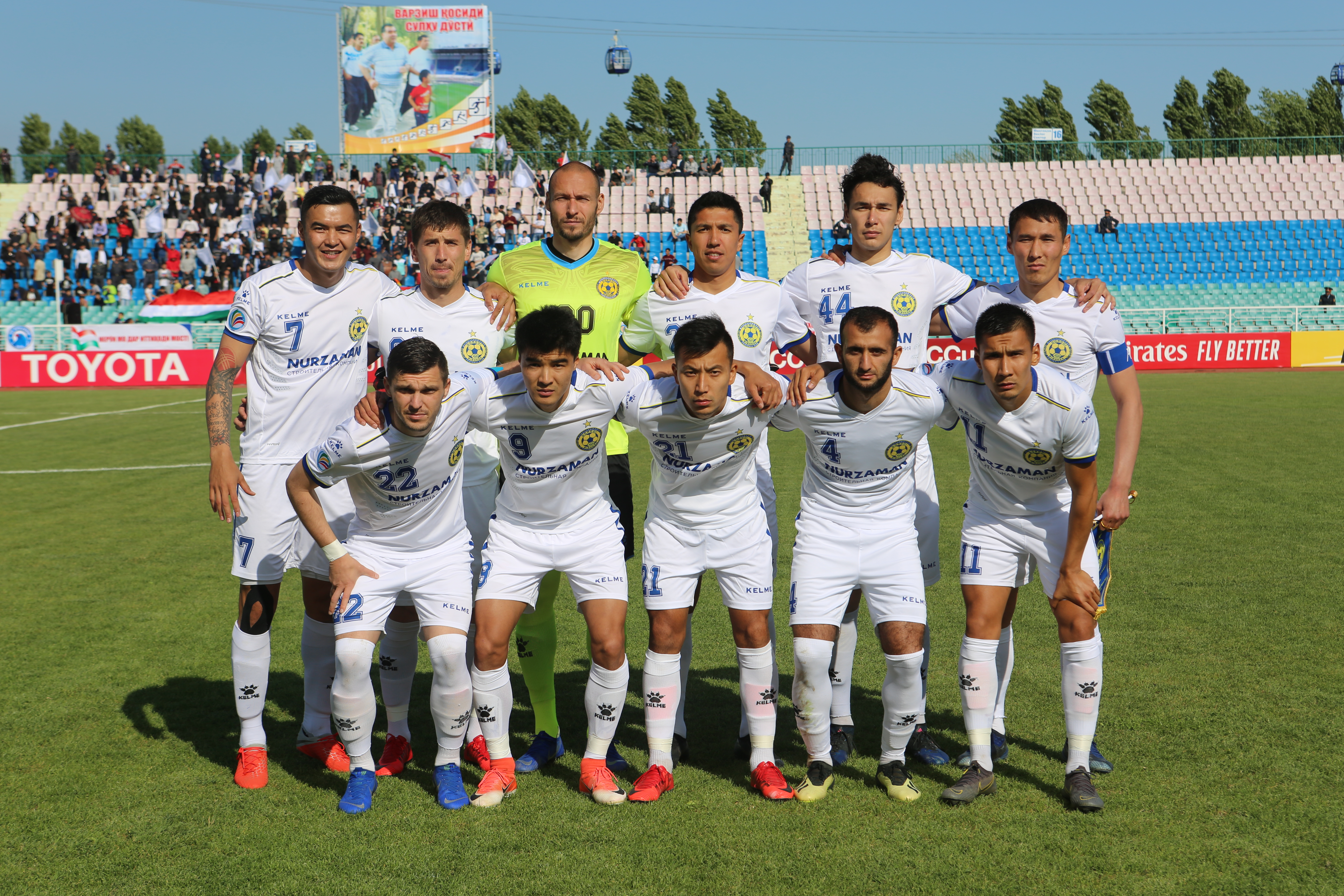
Dordoi Bishkek players lining up during the 2019 AFC Cup at Khujand, in 2017.

On 4 March 2019, "Dordoi" signed a sponsorship agreement with the construction company Nurzaman for the 2019 and 2020 seasons.

On 1 December 2021, Murat Dzhumakeyev was announced as Dordoi Bishkek's new head coach after Aleksandr Krestinin and his coaching teams contract had expired.

In May 2021, the British Fans' Association of FC Dordoi Bishkek was founded.

On 29 November 2022, Zakir Dzhalilov was appointed as Dordoi Bishkek's new head coach for the 2023 season. Dzhalilov left his role as head coach by mutual consent on 17 November 2023.

On 27 December 2023, Dordoi Bishkek announced Maxim Lisitsyn as their new head coach.

=== Names ===
- 1997: Founded as FC Dordoi Naryn.
- 1998: Renamed FC Dordoi-Zhashtyk-SKIF Naryn.
- 1999: Renamed FC Dordoi Naryn.
- 2004: Renamed FC Dordoi-Dynamo Naryn.
- 2010: Renamed FC "Dordoi".

=== Sponsorship ===
Period	Kit manufacturer	Shirt sponsor (chest)	Shirt sponsor (sleeve)
2014–2015	Umbro		
2016–2018	Joma		
2019	Kelme	Nurzaman	
2020	Nike	Nurzaman	
2021	Nike		
2022–	Kelme		

=== Domestic history ===
Season	League									Kyrgyzstan Cup	Top goalscorer	
Season	Div.	Pos.	Pl.	W	D	L	GS	GA	P	Kyrgyzstan Cup	Name	League
1999	1st	5	22	11	0	11	37	40	33			
2000	1st	6	22	11	4	7	44	29	37			
2001	1st	3	28	16	5	7	63	35	53			
2002	1st	3	18	12	3	3	43	13	39			
2003	1st	3	34	27	3	4	120	18	84			
2004	1st	1	36	32	2	2	126	17	98	Winners	Zamirbek Zhumagulov	28
2005	1st	1	24	19	3	2	67	12	60	Winners	Zamirbek Zhumagulov	16
2006	1st	1	10	7	3	0	29	1	24	Winners	Azamat Ishenbaev	13
2007	1st	1	32	24	4	4	73	19	76	Quarter-finals	Azamat Ishenbaev	13
2008	1st	1	16	12	3	1	34	5	39	Winners	David Tetteh	13
2009	1st	1	22	16	5	1	62	12	53	Last 16	Maxim Kretov	21
2010	1st	2	20	13	3	4	43	18	42	Runner-up	David Tetteh	11
2011	1st	1	20	15	3	2	54	25	48	Semi-final	Kayumzhan Sharipov	10
2012	1st	1	28	24	2	2	89	17	74	Winners	Kayumzhan Sharipov	17
2013	1st	2	20	12	4	4	53	16	40	Runner-up	Mirlan Murzaev	12
2014	1st	1	20	15	3	2	67	8	48	Winners	Kalim Ullah	18
2015	1st	2	20	13	3	4	60	22	42		Mirlan Murzaev	15
2016	1st	2	18	13	4	1	52	18	43	Winners	Kairat Zhyrgalbek Uulu	7
2017	1st	3	20	10	5	5	34	15	35	Winners	Alisher Azizov	10
2018	1st	1	28	21	5	2	94	31	68	Winners	Ernist Batyrkanov	17
2019	1st	1	28	21	3	4	76	21	66	Runners-up	Wahyt Orazsähedow	20
2020	1st	1	14	11	2	1	38	9	35	n/a	Mirlan Murzaev	10
2021	1st	1	28	19	5	4	57	27	62	Semi-final	Tursunali Rustamov	8
2022	1st	4	27	12	8	7	45	30	44	First round	Joel Kojo	8
2023	1st	3	27	14	8	5	54	24	50	?	Danin Talović	14
2024	1st	2	27	17	8	2	43	18	59	?	Suyuntbek Mamyraliyev	9
2025	1st	4	26	16	6	4	42	27	54	?	Kimi Merk	8

=== Continental ===
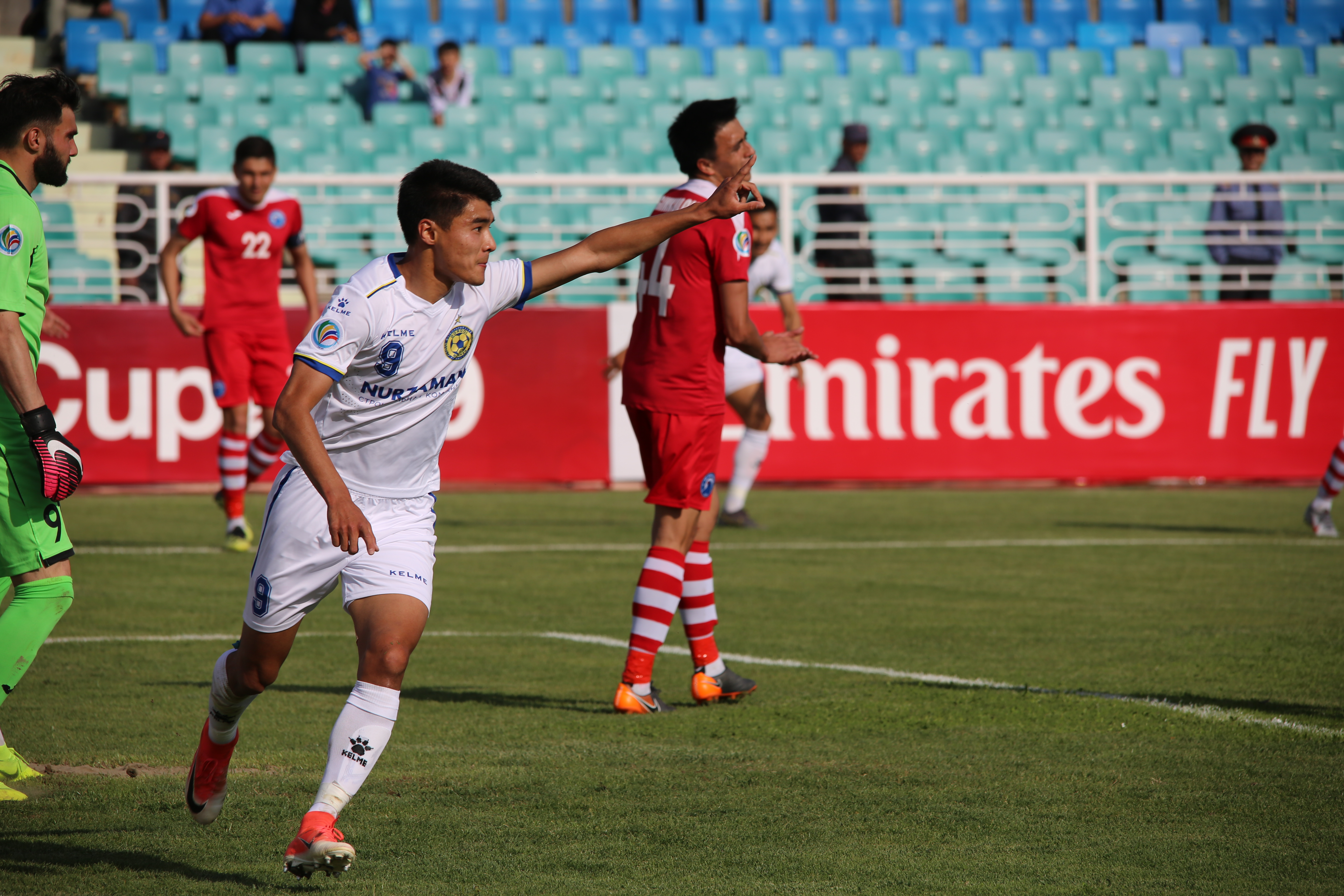
Bekzhan Sagynbaev scored against FC "Khujand" - AFC Cup 2019

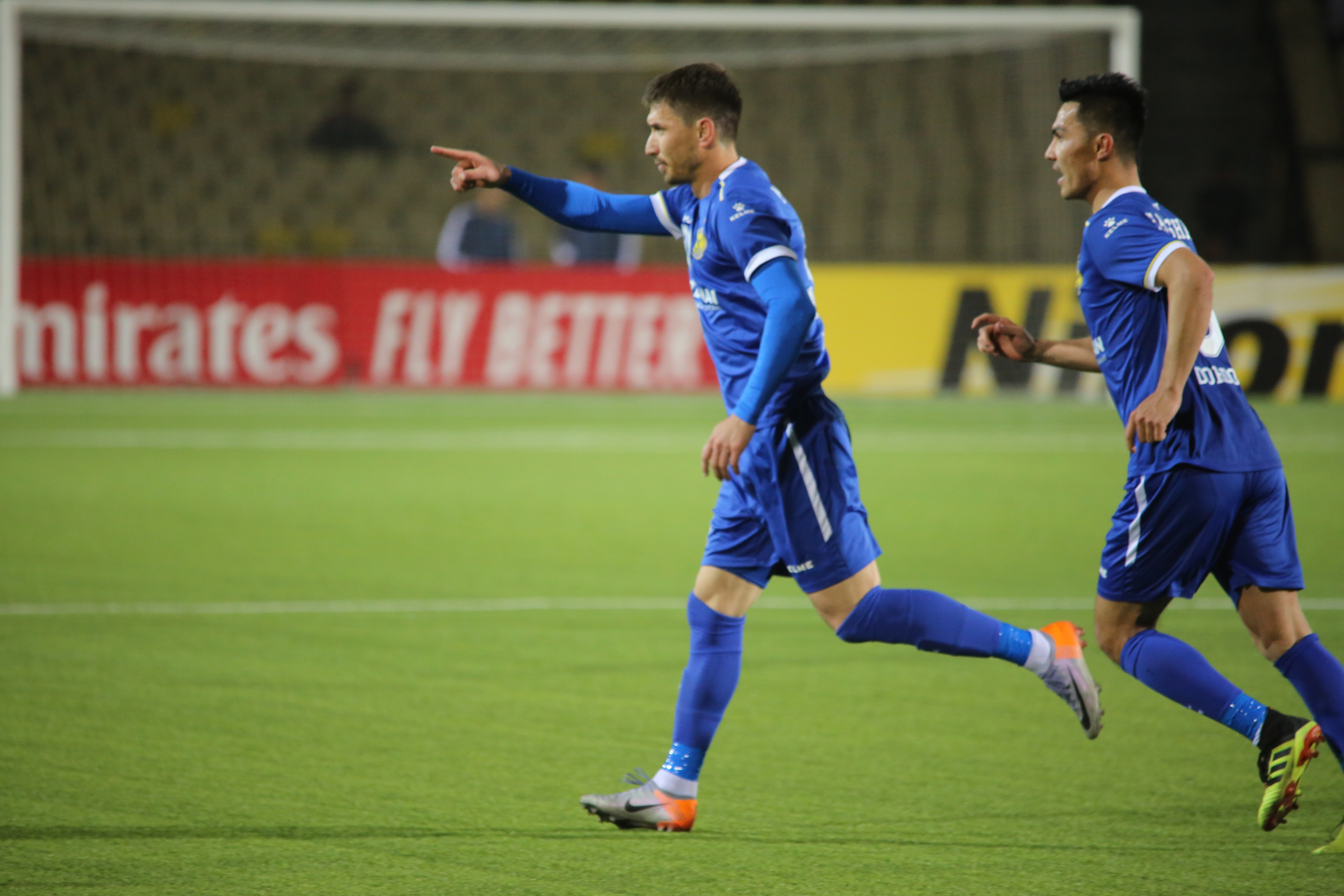
Mirlan Murzaev just scored against "Istiklol" - AFC Cup 2019

As of match played 11 August 2026

Competition	Pld	W	D	L	GF	GA
AFC President's Cup	29	19	5	5	69	19
AFC Cup	25	9	5	11	30	41
AFC Challenge League	1	0	1	0	1	1
Total	55	28	11	16	100	61

Season	Competition	Round	Club	Home	Away	Aggregate
2005	AFC President's Cup	Group Stage	(Cambodia) Phnom Penh Crown	6–1		
2005	AFC President's Cup	Group Stage	(Sri Lanka) Blue Star	8–1		
2005	AFC President's Cup	Group Stage	(Pakistan) WAPDA	0–1		
2005	AFC President's Cup	Semi-final	(Nepal) Three Star Club	0–0 (a.e.t.), (p)		
2005	AFC President's Cup	Final	(Tajikistan) Regar-TadAZ	0–3		
2006	AFC President's Cup	Group Stage	(Tajikistan) Vakhsh	0–3		
2006	AFC President's Cup	Group Stage	(Sri Lanka) Ratnam	3–0		
2006	AFC President's Cup	Group Stage	(Nepal) Manang Marshyangdi	2–0		
2006	AFC President's Cup	Semi-final	(Cambodia) Khemara Keila	3–0		
2006	AFC President's Cup	Final	(Tajikistan) Vakhsh	2–1 (a.e.t.)		
2007	AFC President's Cup	Group Stage	(Cambodia) Khemara Keila	4–0		
2007	AFC President's Cup	Group Stage	(Nepal) Mahendra Police Club	3–0		
2007	AFC President's Cup	Group Stage	(Chinese Taipei) Tatung	5–0		
2007	AFC President's Cup	Semi-final	(Sri Lanka) Ratnam	1–1 (a.e.t.), (p)		
2007	AFC President's Cup	Final	(Nepal) Mahendra Police Club	2–1		
2008	AFC President's Cup	Group Stage	(Chinese Taipei) Taipower FC	3–0		
2008	AFC President's Cup	Group Stage	(Cambodia) Nagacorp	2–0		
2008	AFC President's Cup	Semi-final	Nepal Police Club	0–0 (p)		
2008	AFC President's Cup	Final	(Tajikistan) Regar-TadAZ	1–1 (p)		
2009	AFC President's Cup	Group Stage	(Bhutan) Yeedzin	7–0		
2009	AFC President's Cup	Group Stage	(Cambodia) Phnom Penh Crown	3–1		
2009	AFC President's Cup	Group Stage	(Myanmar) Kanbawza	2–1		
2009	AFC President's Cup	Semi-final	(Turkmenistan) Aşgabat	2–1		
2009	AFC President's Cup	Final	(Tajikistan) Regar-TadAZ	0–2		
2010	AFC President's Cup	Group Stage	(Chinese Taipei) Hasus NTCPE	5–0		
2010	AFC President's Cup	Group Stage	(Nepal) New Road	3–0		
2010	AFC President's Cup	Group Stage	(Bangladesh) Abahani Limited	0–0		
2010	AFC President's Cup	Semi-final	(Turkmenistan) FC HTTU	2–0		
2010	AFC President's Cup	Final	(Myanmar) Yadanarbon	0–1 (a.e.t.)		
2015	AFC Cup	Preliminary round	(Turkmenistan) Ahal	0–1		
2017	AFC Cup	Preliminary round	(Guam) Rovers	2–0		
2017	AFC Cup	Preliminary round	Benfica de Macau	2–1		
2017	AFC Cup	Preliminary stage 2	(Turkmenistan) Balkan	0–0	2–1	3–2
2017	AFC Cup	Play-off round	(Tajikistan) Khosilot	1–0	1–1	2–1
2017	AFC Cup	Group D	(Turkmenistan) Altyn Asyr	0–2	0–3	3rd
2017	AFC Cup	Group D	(Kyrgyzstan) Alay Osh	1–0	4–5	3rd
2017	AFC Cup	Group D	(Tajikistan) Istiklol	1–4	0–2	3rd
2018	AFC Cup	Preliminary stage 2	(Turkmenistan) Ahal	1–3	2–2	3–5
2019	AFC Cup	Group D	(Tajikistan) Istiklol	2–1	1–4	3rd
2019	AFC Cup	Group D	(Turkmenistan) Altyn Asyr	1–1	1–3	3rd
2019	AFC Cup	Group D	(Tajikistan) Khujand	3–0	1–3	3rd
2020	AFC Cup	Group D	(Turkmenistan) Altyn Asyr	—N/a	—N/a	-
2020	AFC Cup	Group D	(Tajikistan) Khujand	—N/a	—N/a	-
2020	AFC Cup	Group D	(Tajikistan) Istiklol	—N/a	—N/a	-
2021	AFC Cup	Group E	(Turkmenistan) Ahal	0–2		2nd
2021	AFC Cup	Group E	(Tajikistan) Ravshan	3–0		2nd
2022	AFC Cup	Group F	(Tajikistan) Khujand	0–0		3rd
2022	AFC Cup	Group F	(Turkmenistan) Köpetdag Aşgabat	0–1		3rd
2026–27	AFC Challenge League	Preliminary round	(Syria) Homs Al Fidaa	1–1 (a.e.t.) (7–8 p)		

=== Commonwealth of Independent States Cup ===
2007: Group Stage
2008: Group Stage
2009: Group Stage
2010: Group Stage

== Current squad ==
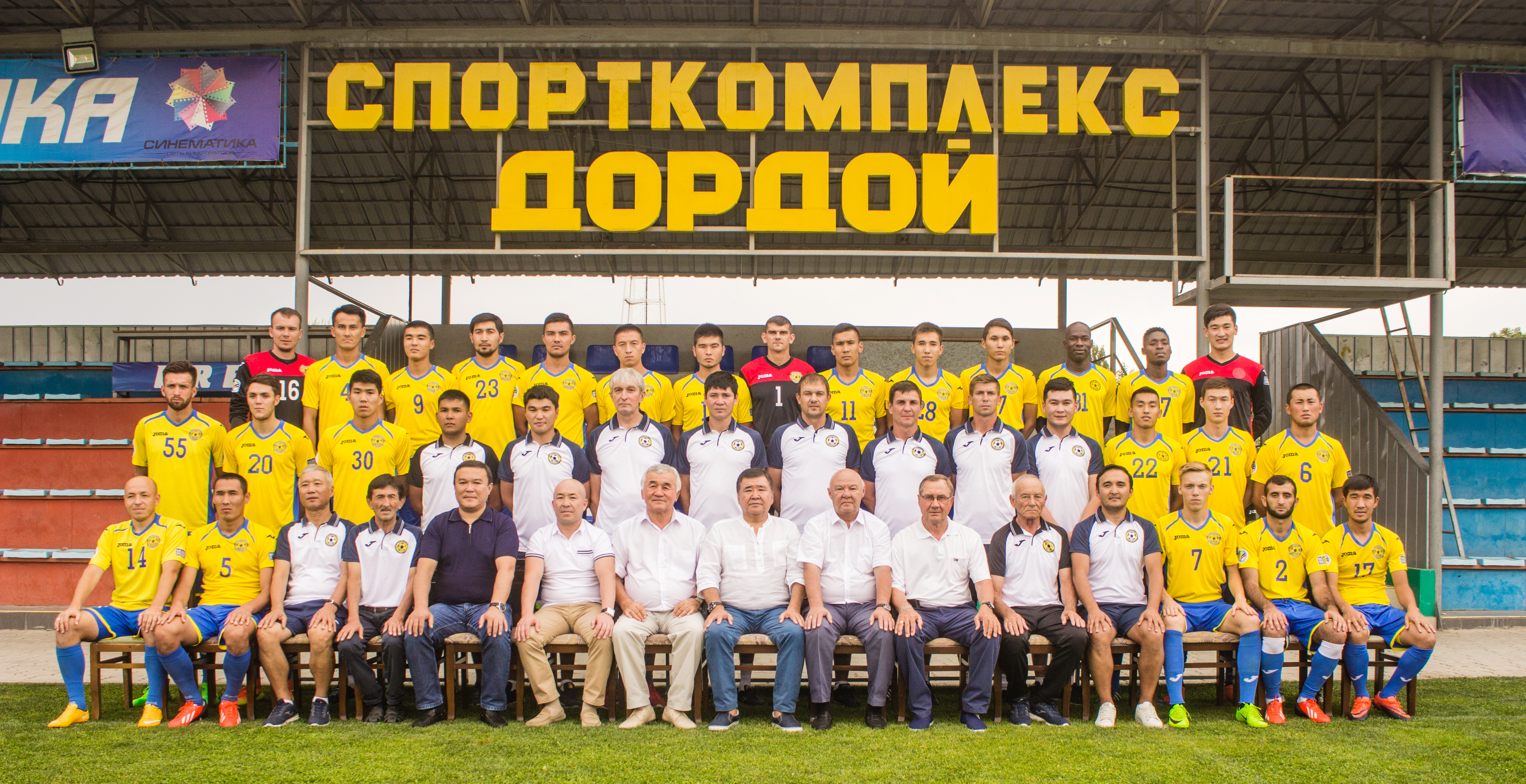
FC "Dordoi", Bishkek, Kyrgyz Republic - August 2017

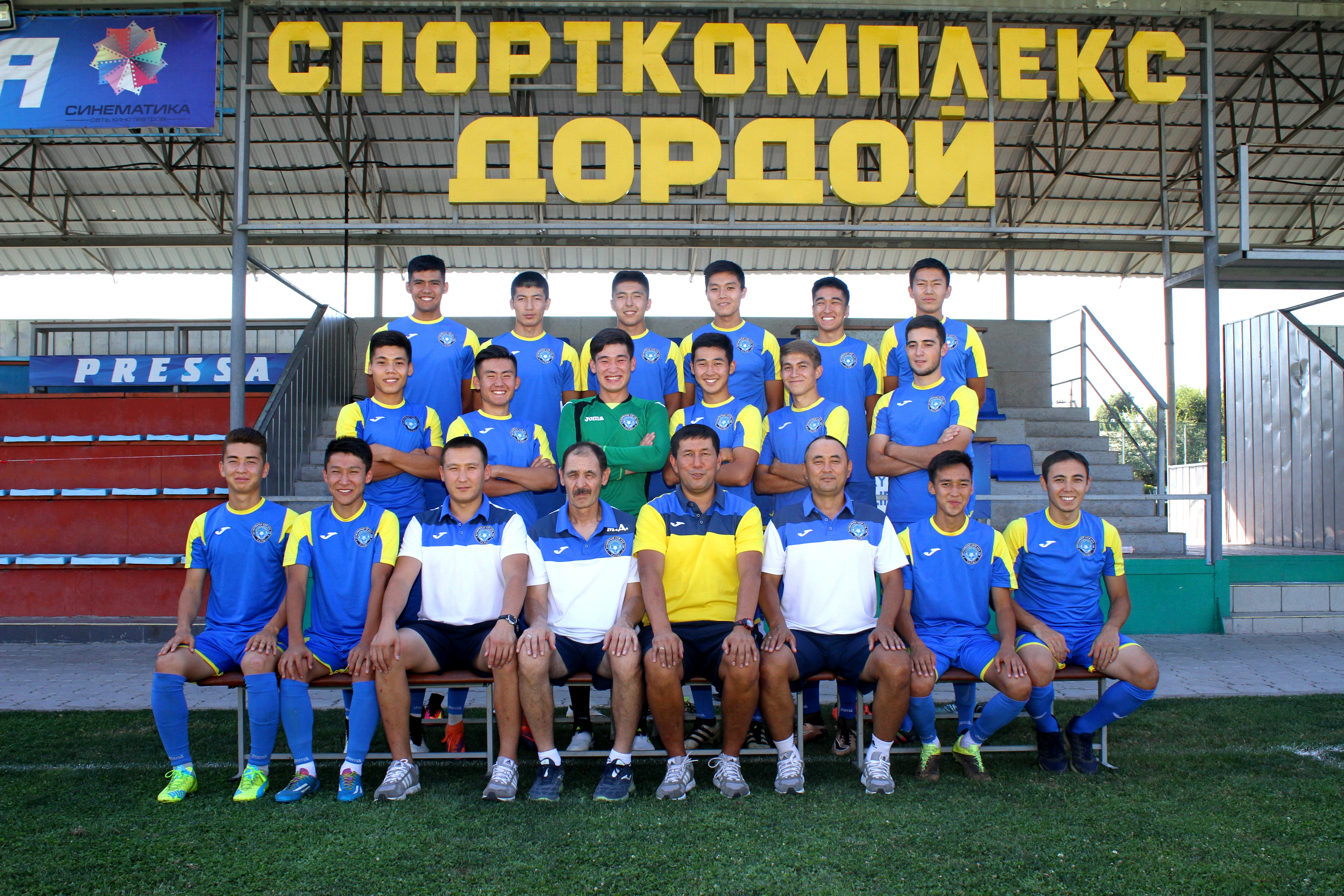
"Dordoi" B team - 2017

As of 11 August 2026

Note: Flags indicate national team as defined under FIFA eligibility rules; some limited exceptions apply. Players may hold more than one non-FIFA nationality.

No.	Pos.	Nation	Player
1	GK	KGZ	Adilet Abdyrayymov
5	DF	KGZ	Salim Mambetov
6	MF	KGZ	Kalys Narynbekov
7	FW	KGZ	Ernist Batyrkanov
8	MF	UKR	Vladyslav Kobylyanskyi
9	FW	KGZ	Ernaz Abilov
10	FW	KGZ	Suyuntbek Mamyraliyev
11	FW	KGZ	Amantur Isakov
14	MF	KGZ	Adil Kadyrzhanov
17	MF	SDN	Yasin Hamed
18	FW	KGZ	Ilya Bondarenko
19	DF	TUR	Göktuğ Demiroğlu
20	MF	UKR	Dmytro Semeniv
22	FW	KGZ	Anvar Adilet uulu

No.	Pos.	Nation	Player
23	MF	KGZ	Mirlan Bekberdinov
27	MF	UKR	Oleg Marchuk
31	DF	KGZ	Aleksandr Mishchenko
35	GK	KGZ	Kurmanbek Nurlanbekov
44	FW	UKR	Maksym Pukhtyeyev
47	DF	KAZ	Arystan Kuanov
67	DF	KGZ	Aydar Mambetaliyev
71	MF	RUS	Tamirlan Dzhamalutdinov
73	DF	KGZ	Nazar Kenzhebek uulu
86	FW	KGZ	Gulzhigit Borubaev
88	MF	UKR	Illya Hulko
97	DF	UKR	Andriy Karvatskyi
98	DF	CZE	Jakub Hrustinec
99	FW	COL	David Polanco

== Notable managers ==
Information correct as of match played 30 October 2015. Only competitive matches are counted.

Name	Nat.	From	To	P	W	D	L	GS	GA	%W	Honours	Notes
Boris Podkorytov	Kyrgyzstan	January 2004	January 2005	0	0	0	0	0	0	—	Kyrgyzstan League (1), Kyrgyzstan Cup (1)	
Boris Podkorytov	Kyrgyzstan	June 2006	December 2007	42	28	6	8	0	0	66.67	Kyrgyzstan League (2), Kyrgyzstan Cup (1), AFC President's Cup (2)	
Sergey Dvoryankov	Russia	January 2008	December 2013	192	133	31	28	0	0	69.27	Kyrgyzstan League (4), Kyrgyzstan Cup (3)	
Zaviša Milosavljević	Serbia	January 2014	27 October 2015	0	0	0	0	0	0	—	Kyrgyzstan League (1), Kyrgyzstan Cup (1)	
Anarbek Ormombekov	Kyrgyzstan	November 2015	6 June 2016	0	0	0	0	0	0	—		
Ruslan Sydykov	Kyrgyzstan	6 June 2016		0	0	0	0	0	0	—	Kyrgyzstan Cup (1)	
Murat Dzhumakeev	Kyrgyzstan	18 August 2016	23 August 2016	2	2	0	0	4	1	100.00		Took charge of AFC Cup Qualifiers due to Sydykov's lack of qualifications.
Aleksandr Krestinin	Russia	29 May 2017	1 December 2021	0	0	0	0	0	0	—	Kyrgyz Premier League (4), Kyrgyzstan Cup (2), Kyrgyzstan Super Cup (2)	

- Notes:

P – Total of played matches W – Won matches D – Drawn matches L – Lost matches GS – Goal scored GA – Goals against
%W – Percentage of matches won

Nationality is indicated by the corresponding FIFA country code(s).

== Honours ==
=== Domestic ===
- Kyrgyzstan League
  - Champions (13): 2004, 2005, 2006, 2007, 2008, 2009, 2011, 2012, 2014, 2018, 2019, 2020, 2021
- Kyrgyzstan Cup
  - Winners (10): 2004, 2005, 2006, 2008, 2010, 2012, 2014, 2016, 2017, 2018, 2025
- Super Cup
  - Winners (6): 2012, 2013, 2014, 2019, 2021, 2022

=== Continental ===
- AFC President's Cup
  - Winners (2): 2006, 2007

== See also ==
- FC Muras-Sport Bishkek
