= Kyrgyzstan national football team =

National association football team

Kyrgyz Republic
- Nickname(s): Ак шумкарлар, Ak shumkarlar (The White Falcons)
- Association: Kyrgyz Football Union (KFU)
- Confederation: AFC (Asia)
- Sub-confederation: CAFA (Central Asia)
- Head coach: Urmat Abdukaimov
- Captain: Valery Kichin
- Most caps: Kayrat Zhyrgalbek uulu (84)
- Top scorer: Mirlan Murzayev (16)
- Home stadium: Dolen Omurzakov Stadium
- FIFA code: KGZ
First colours	Second colours

FIFA ranking
- Current: 104 ▲2 (7 October 2026)
- Highest: 75 (April–May 2018)
- Lowest: 201 (March 2013)

First international
- Uzbekistan 3–0 Kyrgyzstan (Tashkent, Uzbekistan; 23 August 1992)

Biggest win
- Kyrgyzstan 7–0 Myanmar (Bishkek, Kyrgyzstan; 10 October 2019); Myanmar 1–8 Kyrgyzstan (Osaka, Japan; 11 June 2021)

Biggest defeat
- Iran 7–0 Kyrgyzstan (Damascus, Syria; 4 June 1997)

Asian Cup
- Appearances: 3 (first in 2019)
- Best result: Round of 16 (2019)

CAFA Nations Cup
- Appearances: 2 (first in 2023)
- Best result: Fourth place (2023)

WAFF Championship
- Appearances: 1 (first in 2000)
- Best result: Group stage (2000)

AFC Challenge Cup
- Appearances: 3 (first in 2006)
- Best result: Third place (2006)

The Kyrgyzstan national football team (Kyrgyz: Кыргыз Республикасынын улуттук курама командасы; Russian: Сборная Кыргызской Республики по футболу), officially recognised by FIFA and AFC as Kyrgyz Republic, represents Kyrgyzstan in international football and is controlled by the Kyrgyz Football Union, a member of the Asian Football Confederation (AFC) and Central Asian Football Association.

== Stadium ==
Home matches are played at the Dolen Omurzakov Stadium in Bishkek, which has a capacity of 23,000. A new 51,000-seat stadium, the Azattyk Arena, is currently under construction and expected in open in August 2026.

== Results and fixtures ==
The following is a list of match results in the last 12 months, as well as any future matches that have been scheduled.

Win Draw Loss Fixture

=== 2026 ===
25 March Friendly	Kyrgyzstan	0–1	Equatorial Guinea	Antalya, Türkiye
17:00 UTC+3		Report	Josete 40' (pen.)	Stadium: Emirhan Sport Complex; Referee: Cihan Aydın (Turkey)

28 March Friendly	Kyrgyzstan	2–5	Madagascar	Belek, Türkiye
17:00 UTC+2	Almazbekov 58' (pen.); Köçkönbaev 62'	Report	Randrianantenaina 5'; Fontaine 17'; Caddy 24', 79' (pen.); Couturier 42'	Stadium: Calista Sports Center; Referee: Kadir Sağlam (Turkey)

30 March Friendly	Kyrgyzstan	Cancelled	Bahrain	Antalya, Türkiye
--:-- UTC+3
Note: Match cancelled due to travel disruptions from the 2026 Iran war.

6 June Friendly	Palestine	0–0	Kyrgyzstan	Bishkek, Kyrgyzstan
20:30 UTC+6				Stadium: Dolen Omurzakov Stadium

9 June Friendly	Kyrgyzstan	0–0	Palestine	Bishkek, Kyrgyzstan
20:30 UTC+6				Stadium: Dolen Omurzakov Stadium

28 September Friendly	Kyrgyzstan	5–0	Maldives	Bishkek, Kyrgyzstan
20:00 UTC+6	Atabayev 11', 23'; Sirozhiddin 20'; Murzakov 32'; Kojo 42'	Report		Stadium: Dolen Omurzakov Stadium

4 October Friendly	Kyrgyzstan	3–1	Lebanon	Bishkek, Kyrgyzstan
20:00 UTC+6	Abdurakhmanov 19'; Shukurov 31'; Khamis 64' (o.g.)	Report	Budib 62'	Stadium: Dolen Omurzakov Stadium; Referee: Rafael Shafeev (Russia)

14 November 2026 Casper Cup	Chinese Taipei	0–3	Kyrgyzstan	Ninh Bình, Vietnam
19:00 UTC+7		Report	Zhyrgalbek uulu 31'; Kojo 44'; Akmatov 90+1'	Stadium: Thiên Trường Stadium; Referee: Hoàng Ngọc Hà (Vietnam)

17 November 2026 Casper Cup	Kyrgyzstan	2–1	Vietnam	Ninh Bình, Vietnam
19:00 UTC+7	Kichin 86'; Atabayev 88'	Report	Nguyễn Đình Bắc 19'	Stadium: Thiên Trường Stadium; Attendance: 5,102; Referee: Nawal Zubir (Malaysia)

=== 2027 ===
9 January 2027 Asian Cup GS	Syria	v	Kyrgyzstan	Riyadh, Saudi Arabia
--:--				Stadium: King Fahd Sports City Stadium

13 January 2027 Asian Cup GS	Kyrgyzstan	v	Iran	Riyadh, Saudi Arabia
--:--				Stadium: Al Shabab Stadium

18 January 2027 Asian Cup GS	Kyrgyzstan	v	China	Riyadh, Saudi Arabia
--:--				Stadium: Kingdom Arena

== Coaching staff ==
As of 25 August 2026.

Position	Name
Head coach	(Kyrgyzstan) Urmat Abdukaimov
Assistant coach	
Goalkeeping coach	
Fitness coach	
Executive director	
Administrator	
Medical	

=== Coaching history ===
As of match played September 2025

Manager	From	To	Record				
Manager	From	To	G	W	D	L	Win %
(Kyrgyzstan) Meklis Koshaliyev	August 1992	February 1996	15	1	3	11	6.67
(Kyrgyzstan) Yevgeniy Novikov	June 1997	February 2001	19	4	1	14	21.05
(Kyrgyzstan) Nematjan Zakirov	March 2003	March 2006	12	4	2	6	33.33
(Kyrgyzstan) Boris Podkorytov	March 2006	December 2006	6	3	0	3	50.00
(Kyrgyzstan) Nematjan Zakirov	January 2007	December 2008	12	4	0	8	33.33
(Kyrgyzstan) Anarbek Ormonbekov	January 2009	May 2011	13	3	3	7	23.08
(Kyrgyzstan) Murat Jumakeev	May 2011	September 2012	3	0	0	3	0.00
(Russia) Sergey Dvoryankov	September 2012	May 2014	6	3	1	2	50.00
(Kyrgyzstan) Mirlan Eshenov (caretaker)	May 2014	October 2014	3	0	0	3	0.00
(Russia) Aleksandr Krestinin	October 2014	3 April 2023	61	27	10	24	44.26
(Slovakia) Štefan Tarkovič	24 April 2023	12 June 2024	19	6	4	9	31.58
(Russia) Maksim Lisitsyn	13 June 2024	27 June 2025	10	2	2	6	20.00
(Kyrgyzstan) Urmat Abdukaimov (caretaker)	27 June 2025	10 December 2025	3	0	1	2	0.00
(Croatia) Robert Prosinečki	10 December 2025	25 August 2026	4	2	2	0	50.00
(Kyrgyzstan) Urmat Abdukaimov	25 August 2026		0	0	0	0	—
Total			186	59	29	98	31.72

== Players ==
=== Current squad ===
The following 21 players were called up for the friendly matches against Palestine on 6 and 9 June 2026.

Information correct as of 9 June 2026, after the match against Palestine.

No.	Pos.	Player	Date of birth (age)	Caps	Goals	Club
	GK	Erzhan Tokotayev	17 July 2000 (age 26)	41	0	(Kyrgyz Football Union) Alga Bishkek
	GK	Kurmanbek Nurlanbekov	1 April 2004 (age 22)	2	0	(Kyrgyz Football Union) Dordoi Bishkek
	GK	Artem Pryadkin	18 September 2001 (age 25)	1	0	(Kyrgyz Football Union) Bishkek City
	DF	Tamirlan Kozubaev	1 July 1994 (age 32)	70	3	(Football Association of Indonesia) Persita Tangerang
	DF	Ermek Kenzhebayev	3 April 2003 (age 23)	18	0	(Kyrgyz Football Union) Alga Bishkek
	DF	Said Datsiev	10 April 2003 (age 23)	7	0	(Kyrgyz Football Union) Bars Issyk-Kul
	DF	Arslan Bekberdinov	27 August 1999 (age 27)	5	0	(Kyrgyz Football Union) Alga Bishkek
	DF	Ulanbek Sulaymanov	8 October 2002 (age 24)	5	0	(Kyrgyz Football Union) Ozgon
	DF	Valeriy Murzakov	2 September 2003 (age 23)	2	0	(Kyrgyz Football Union) Talant
	MF	Kayrat Zhyrgalbek uulu	13 June 1993 (age 33)	85	4	(Kyrgyz Football Union) Bars Issyk-Kul
	MF	Odilzhon Abdurakhmanov	18 March 1996 (age 30)	56	3	(Vietnam Football Federation) Dong A Thanh Hoa
	MF	Gulzhigit Alykulov	25 November 2000 (age 25)	50	6	(Football Federation of Belarus) Dinamo Minsk
	MF	Alimardon Shukurov	28 September 1999 (age 27)	36	6	(Kyrgyz Football Union) Muras United
	MF	Murolimzhon Akhmedov	5 January 1992 (age 34)	27	0	(Kyrgyz Football Union) Alga Bishkek
	MF	Erbol Atabayev	15 August 2001 (age 25)	25	0	(Croatian Football Federation) Lokomotiva Zagreb
	MF	Beknaz Almazbekov	23 June 2005 (age 21)	21	0	(Ukrainian Association of Football) Rukh Lviv
	MF	Eldiyar Zarypbekov	14 September 2001 (age 25)	20	1	(Russian Football Union) Chernomorets Novorossiysk
	MF	Kimi Merk	6 July 2004 (age 22)	19	1	(Kyrgyz Football Union) Alga Bishkek
	MF	Magomed Uzdenov	25 February 1994 (age 32)	10	0	(Kyrgyz Football Union) Bars Issyk-Kul
	MF	Adil Kadyrzhanov	14 July 2000 (age 26)	8	0	(Kyrgyz Football Union) Dordoi Bishkek
	MF	Nurdoolot Stalbekov	13 September 2001 (age 25)	7	0	(Football Federation of Belarus) Isloch Minsk Raion
	MF	Amir Zhaparov	25 February 1994 (age 32)	6	0	(Kyrgyz Football Union) Muras United
	MF	Bektur Kochkonbaev	11 January 2003 (age 23)	3	0	(Kyrgyz Football Union) Ozgon
	FW	Ernist Batyrkanov	21 February 1998 (age 28)	37	3	(Kyrgyz Football Union) Dordoi Bishkek
	FW	Kai Merk	28 August 1998 (age 28)	29	3	(Kyrgyz Football Union) Alga Bishkek
	FW	Gulzhigit Borubaev	22 April 2000 (age 26)	2	0	(Football Federation of Belarus) Neman Grodno

=== Recent call-ups ===
The following players have been called up to the national team in the past 12 months but are not part of the current squad.

Pos.	Player	Date of birth (age)	Caps	Goals	Club	Latest call-up
GK	Sultan Chomoev	20 January 2003 (age 23)	2	0	(Kyrgyzstan) Abdysh-Ata Kant	v. Madagascar, 28 March 2026
DF	Valery Kichin	12 October 1992 (age 34)	61	6	(Kyrgyzstan) Bars Issyk-Kul	v. Madagascar, 28 March 2026
DF	Khristiyan Brauzman	15 August 2003 (age 23)	30	2	(Kyrgyzstan) Abdysh-Ata Kant	v. Madagascar, 28 March 2026
DF	Amantur Shamurzaev	25 January 2000 (age 26)	7	0	(Kyrgyzstan) Abdysh-Ata Kant	v. Madagascar, 28 March 2026
MF	Azim Azarov	20 September 1996 (age 30)	5	1	(Kyrgyzstan) Abdysh-Ata Kant	v. Madagascar, 28 March 2026
MF	Arsen Sharshenbekov	16 March 2004 (age 22)	3	0	(Kyrgyzstan) Asia Talas	v. Madagascar, 28 March 2026
MF	Anton Polev	9 June 2003 (age 23)	1	0	(Kyrgyzstan) Talant	v. Madagascar, 28 March 2026
FW	Joel Kojo	21 August 1998 (age 28)	23	10	(Iran) Esteghlal	v. Madagascar, 28 March 2026
FW	Arlen Beksulov	17 August 2002 (age 24)	2	0	(Kyrgyzstan) Talant	v. Madagascar, 28 March 2026
FW	Maksat Alygulov	25 April 1998 (age 28)	3	0	(Kyrgyzstan) Muras United	v. Madagascar, 28 March 2026
Notes^{PRE} Preliminary squad standby.

== Player records ==
As of 6 June 2026
Players in bold are still active with Kyrgyzstan.

=== Most appearances ===
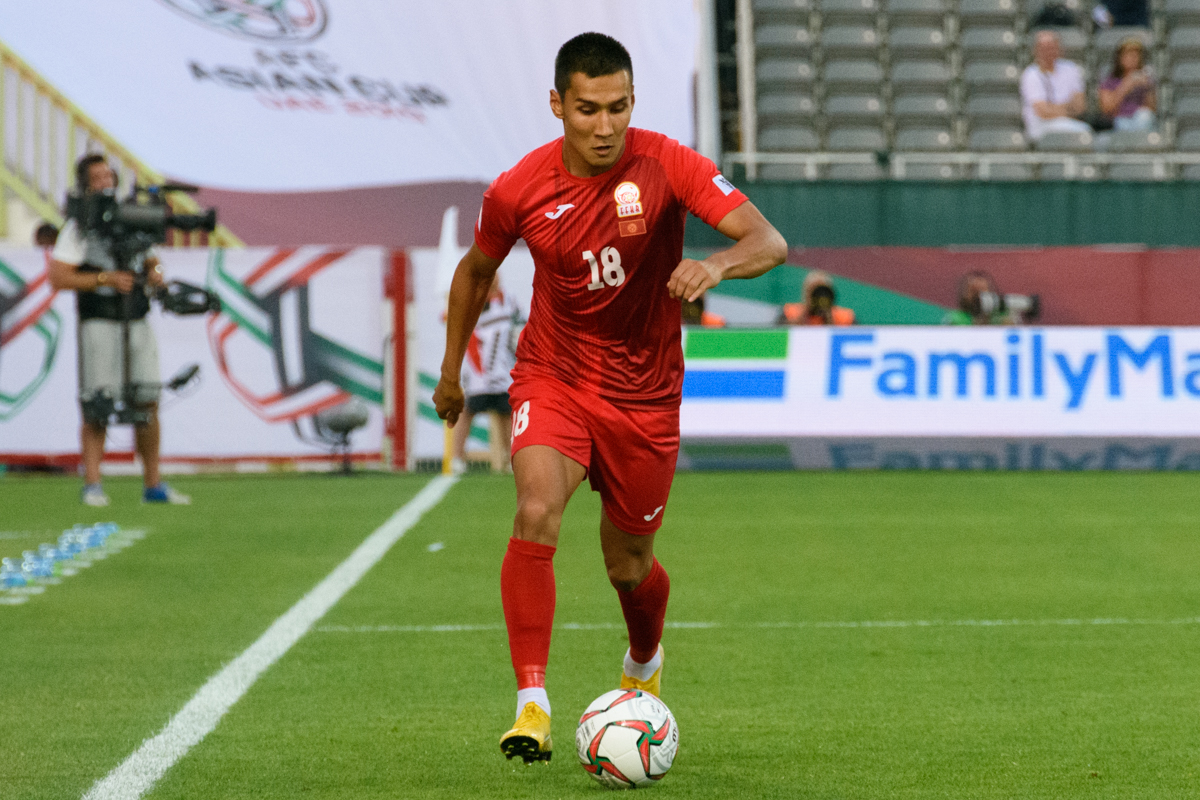
Kayrat Zhyrgalbek uulu is Kyrgyzstan's most capped player with 83 appearances.

Rank	Player	Caps	Goals	Career
1	**Kayrat Zhyrgalbek uulu**	85	4	2013–present
2	**Tamirlan Kozubayev**	69	3	2015–present
3	**Valery Kichin**	61	6	2011–present
3	**Farhat Musabekov**	61	2	2015–present
5	Mirlan Murzayev	60	16	2009–2023
6	**Odilzhon Abdurakhmanov**	55	3	2016–present
7	Vadim Kharchenko	53	3	2003–2015
8	**Gulzhigit Alykulov**	50	6	2019–present
9	**Bakhtiyar Duyshobekov**	48	3	2015–present
10	Pavel Matyash	46	0	2009–2021

=== Top goalscorers ===
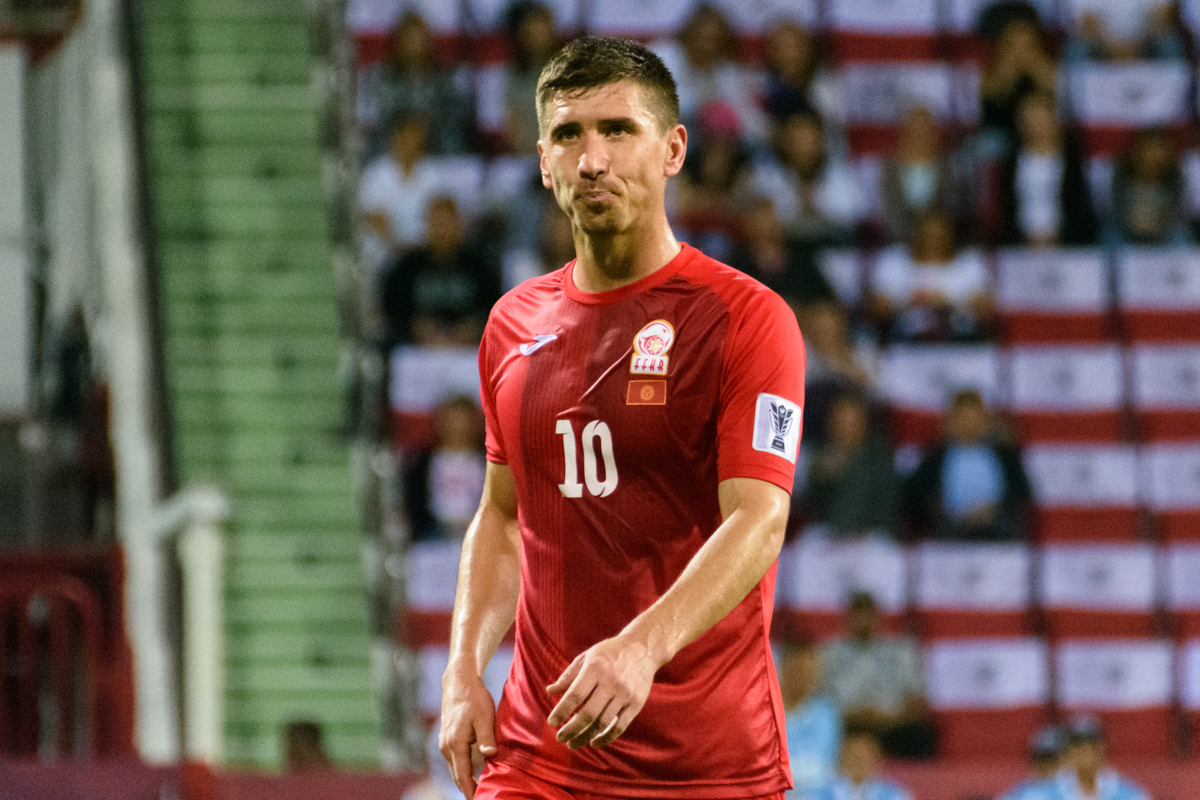
Mirlan Murzayev is Kyrgyzstan's top scorer with 16 goals.

Rank	Player	Goals	Caps	Average	Period
1	Mirlan Murzayev	16	60	0.27	2009–2023
2	Anton Zemlianukhin	13	33	0.39	2007–2023
3	**Joel Kojo**	11	30	0.37	2023–present
4	Vitalij Lux	8	32	0.25	2015–2019
5	**Alimardon Shukurov**	7	38	0.18	2017–present
6	Tursunali Rustamov	6	32	0.19	2012–2023
6	**Gulzhigit Alykulov**	6	50	0.12	2019–present
6	**Valery Kichin**	6	61	0.1	2011–present
9	Edgar Bernhardt	5	41	0.12	2014–2021
10	Viktor Maier	4	24	0.17	2015–2023
10	Akhlidin Israilov	4	34	0.12	2013–2022
10	Azamat Baymatov	4	36	0.11	2010–2019
10	**Bekzhan Sagynbaev**	4	41	0.1	2018–present
10	**Kayrat Zhyrgalbek uulu**	4	85	0.05	2013–present

== Competitive record ==
=== FIFA World Cup ===
FIFA World Cup record									Qualification record					
Year	Result	Position	Pld	W	D*	L	GF	GA	Pld	W	D	L	GF	GA
(Uruguay) 1930 to (Italy) 1990	Part of Soviet Union								Part of Soviet Union					
(United States) 1994	Not a FIFA member								Not a FIFA member					
(France) 1998	Did not qualify								6	3	0	3	12	14
(South Korea) (Japan) 2002	Did not qualify								6	1	1	4	3	9
(Germany) 2006	Did not qualify								8	3	1	4	11	12
(South Africa) 2010	Did not qualify								2	1	0	1	2	2
(Brazil) 2014	Did not qualify								2	0	0	2	0	7
(Russia) 2018	Did not qualify								8	4	2	2	10	8
(Qatar) 2022	Did not qualify								8	3	1	4	19	12
(Canada) (Mexico) (United States) 2026	Did not qualify								16	5	4	7	25	25
(Morocco) (Portugal) (Spain) 2030	To be determined								To be determined					
(Saudi Arabia) 2034	To be determined								To be determined					
Total	–	0/7	–	–	–	–	–	–	56	20	9	27	82	89

=== AFC Asian Cup ===
AFC Asian Cup record									Qualification record					
Year	Result	Position	Pld	W	D*	L	GF	GA	Pld	W	D	L	GF	GA
(Hong Kong) 1956 to (Qatar) 1988	Part of Soviet Union								Part of Soviet Union					
(Japan) 1992	Not an AFC member								Not an AFC member					
(United Arab Emirates) 1996	Did not qualify								4	1	0	3	3	7
(Lebanon) 2000	Did not qualify								3	0	0	3	3	11
(China) 2004	Did not qualify								2	1	0	1	3	2
(Indonesia) (Malaysia) (Thailand) (Vietnam) 2007	Did not enter								Did not enter					
(Qatar) 2011	Did not qualify								2008 & 2010 AFC Challenge Cup					
(Australia) 2015	Did not qualify								2012 & 2014 AFC Challenge Cup					
(United Arab Emirates) 2019	Round of 16	15th	4	1	0	3	6	7	14	8	3	3	26	17
(Qatar) 2023	Group stage	20th	3	0	1	2	1	5	11	5	2	4	23	13
(Saudi Arabia) 2027	Qualified								6	3	2	1	13	7
Total	3/9	15th	7	1	1	5	7	12	40	18	7	15	71	57

=== AFC Challenge Cup ===
AFC Challenge Cup record								Qualification record					
Year	Result	Pld	W	D*	L	GF	GA	Pld	W	D	L	GF	GA
(Bangladesh) 2006	Third place	5	3	0	2	4	3	Invited					
(India) 2008	Did not qualify							2	1	0	1	2	2
(Sri Lanka) 2010	Group stage	3	1	0	2	2	6	2	0	2	0	2	2
(Nepal) 2012	Did not qualify							3	1	0	2	5	6
(Maldives) 2014	Group stage	3	1	0	2	1	3	3	3	0	0	3	0
Total	3/5	11	5	0	6	7	12	10	5	2	3	12	10

=== CAFA Nations Cup ===
CAFA Nations Cup record
Year	Result	Pld	W	D	L	GF	GA
(Kyrgyzstan) (Uzbekistan) 2023	Fourth place	3	1	0	2	4	6
(Tajikistan) (Uzbekistan) 2025	Group stage	3	0	1	2	2	7
Total		6	1	1	4	6	13

=== West Asian Championship ===
West Asian Championship record
Year	Result	Pld	W	D	L	GF	GA
(Jordan) 2000	Group stage	3	0	0	3	0	8
Total		3	0	0	3	0	8

=== ELF Cup ===
In 2006, Kyrgyzstan took part in the inaugural ELF Cup in Northern Cyprus. This competition was originally intended to be for teams that were not members of FIFA; however, the organisers extended invitations to both Kyrgyzstan and Tajikistan, who were both represented by their national futsal teams.

Year	Result	Position	Pld	W	D*	L	GF	GA
2006	Semi-finals	3rd place, bronze medalist(s)	5	2	1	2	11	8

*Draws include knockout matches decided via penalty shoot-out.

== Head-to-head record ==
As of 4 October 2026.

Opponents	Played	Won	Drawn*	Lost	GF	GA	GD	% Won
Afghanistan	5	1	1	3	4	4	0	20
Australia	2	0	0	2	1	5	-4	0
Azerbaijan	3	0	1	2	0	4	-4	0
Bahrain	7	0	1	6	4	16	-12	0
Bangladesh	5	5	0	0	14	3	+11	100
Belarus	1	0	0	1	1	3	-2	0
Cambodia	2	2	0	0	8	6	+2	100
China	2	0	0	2	1	5	-4	0
Chinese Taipei	2	2	0	0	7	1	+6	100
Estonia	2	0	1	1	1	2	-1	0
Equatorial Guinea	1	0	0	1	0	1	-1	0
India	5	1	0	4	3	9	-6	20
Indonesia	2	1	0	1	1	4	-3	50
Iran	6	0	0	6	4	25	-21	0
Iraq	2	0	0	2	1	9	-8	0
Japan	3	0	0	3	1	11	-10	0
Jordan	6	3	1	2	4	4	0	50
Kazakhstan	5	0	1	4	3	15	-12	0
Kuwait	5	1	1	3	5	11	-6	20
Lebanon	4	1	2	1	4	4	0	25
Macau	4	4	0	0	8	3	+5	100
Madagascar	1	0	0	1	2	5	–3	0
Malaysia	3	1	1	1	5	5	0	33.33
Maldives	5	3	0	2	15	4	+11	60
Moldova	1	0	0	1	1	2	-1	0
Mongolia	2	1	0	1	2	2	0	50
Myanmar	7	5	2	0	26	5	+21	71.43
Nepal	2	1	1	0	3	1	+2	50
North Korea	3	1	1	1	3	6	-3	0
Oman	7	1	2	4	4	10	-6	14.29
Pakistan	4	3	0	1	7	1	+6	75
Palestine	7	2	4	1	6	5	+1	28.57
Philippines	4	1	0	3	4	5	-1	25
Qatar	4	1	1	2	4	5	-1	25
Russia	1	0	0	1	1	2	-1	0
Saudi Arabia	3	0	0	3	0	7	-7	0
Singapore	4	3	1	0	6	3	+3	75
South Korea	1	0	0	1	0	1	-1	0
Sri Lanka	1	1	0	0	4	1	+3	100
Syria	7	3	2	2	8	10	-2	42.86
Tajikistan	14	3	3	8	10	16	-6	21.43
Thailand	2	0	0	2	1	5	-4	0
Turkmenistan	4	1	1	2	3	7	-4	25
United Arab Emirates	4	0	1	3	3	8	-5	0
Uzbekistan	12	0	0	12	7	43	-36	0
Vietnam	1	1	0	0	2	1	+1	100
Yemen	2	1	0	1	3	2	+1	50
Total	168	50	27	91	193	293	–100	29.76

== Honours ==
=== Friendly ===
- Aceh World Solidarity Cup (1): 2017
- Three Nations Cup (1): 2021
- 2026 Casper Cup (1)
