= FC Zhivoye Pivo =

Kyrgyz football club

Zhivoye Pivo
- Full name: Football Club Zhivoye Pivo
- Founded: 2004; 22 years ago
- Ground: Stadium Abdish-Ata, Kant, Kyrgyzstan
- Capacity: 2,000

FC Zhivoye Pivo (Russian: ФК «Живое Пиво«) was a football club based in Kant, Kyrgyzstan that played as a farm club of FC Abdish-Ata Kant.

== Name history ==
- 2004: Founded as FC Zhasztyk Kant
- 2006: Renamed to FC Schastlivyi Den Kant
- 2009: Renamed to FC Zhivoye Pivo Kant

== Notable records ==
Kyrgyzstan Cup:

- Quarterfinalist: 2005, 2009, 2015

== See also ==
- FC Nashe Pivo
