= Ernist Batyrkanov =

Kyrgyzstani national footballer, forward

Personal information
- Full name: Ernist Muratovich Batyrkanov
- Date of birth: 21 February 1998 (age 28)
- Place of birth: Kara-Köl, Kyrgyzstan
- Height: 1.84 m (6 ft 0 in)
- Position: Forward

Team information
- Current team: Neftchi Kochkor-Ata
- Number: 7

Senior career*
Years	Team	Apps	(Gls)
2015–2016	Ala-Too Naryn		
2016–2020	Dordoi Bishkek		
2021	Kyzylzhar	7	(0)
2021	Van	10	(0)
2022	Abdysh-Ata Kant	11	(14)
2023	Kelantan United	11	(0)
2023	Abdysh-Ata Kant	12	(5)
2024	Muras United		
2025–	Neftchi Kochkor-Ata		

International career^{‡}
2018	Kyrgyzstan U23	3	(2)
2018–	Kyrgyzstan	32	(3)
- * Club domestic league appearances and goals as of 22 January 2023 ‡ National team caps and goals as of 25 January 2024

Ernist Muratovich Batyrkanov (Kyrgyz: Эрнист Баатырканов; Russian: Эрнист Муратович Батырканов; born February 21, 1998) is a Kyrgyzstani footballer who plays for Neftchi Kochkor-Ata in the Kyrgyz Premier League and Kyrgyzstan national football team as a forward.

== Career ==
=== Club ===
He won the Kyrgyzstan League with Dordoi Bishkek in 2018.

In February 2019, Batyrkanov went on trial with Spartak Trnava.

In February 2021, Batyrkanov signed for Kazakhstan Premier League club FC Kyzylzhar. On 15 July 2021, Batyrkanov left Kyzylzhar.

On 7 August 2021, Armenian Premier League club FC Van announced the signing of Batyrkanov. On 27 December 2021, Batyrkanov left Van.

=== International ===
Batyrkanov made his debut for Kyrgyzstan national football team in a friendly match on 6 September 2018 against Palestine. He was included in Kyrgyzstan's squad for the 2018 Asian Games in Indonesia, and the 2019 AFC Asian Cup in the United Arab Emirates.

On 11 June 2021 Batyrkanov played in goal for Kyrgyzstan in a 2022 World Cup qualifier against Myanmar. No other goalkeepers were available due to suspected COVID-19. Kyrgyzstan won the match 1–8.

== Career statistics ==
=== International ===
As of match played 25 January 2024

Kyrgyzstan national team
Year	Apps	Goals
2018	7	0
2019	1	0
2020	0	0
2021	6	1
2022	4	0
2023	10	2
2024	4	0
Total	32	3

=== International goals ===
No.	Date	Venue	Opponent	Score	Result	Competition
1.	11 November 2021	Al Hamriya Sports Club Stadium, Sharjah, United Arab Emirates	Singapore	2–0	2–1	Friendly
2.	10 June 2023	Dolen Omurzakov Stadium, Bishkek, Kyrgyzstan	Afghanistan	1–0	1–0	2023 CAFA Nations Cup
3.	16 November 2023	Bukit Jalil National Stadium, Kuala Lumpur, Malaysia	Malaysia	2–1	3–4	2026 FIFA World Cup qualification
