= Ceylan Arıkan =

Dutch footballer

Ceylan Arikan
Personal information
- Full name: Abdurrahman Ceyln Arikan
- Date of birth: 25 May 1971 (age 55)
- Place of birth: Adana, Turkey
- Position: Midfielder

Senior career*
Years	Team	Apps	(Gls)
1994–1996	NAC	3	(2)
1996–1998	Dordrecht '90	4	(0)

Managerial career
- 2009–2010: Abdysh-Ata Kant
- 2021–: Abdysh-Ata Kant
- * Club domestic league appearances and goals

Ceylan Arikan (born 25 May 1971) is a Dutch football manager and former player who manages Abdysh-Ata Kant. He played as a midfielder.

== Playing career ==
Arikan was born in Adana, Turkey. He started his senior career with Galatasaray After that, he played for Sakaryaspor, İstanbulspor, Kocaelispor, Mersin İdman Yurdu, and VV Heerjansdam. In 1994, he signed for NAC Breda in the Dutch Eredivisie, where he made three league appearances and scored two goals.

== Coaching career ==
In January 2009, Arikan was appointed manager of Abdysh-Ata Kant.
