= FC Abdysh-Ata =

Kyrgyz football club

Abdysh-Ata
- Full name: Football Club Abdysh-Ata; Абдыш-Ата футбол клубу
- Founded: 2000; 26 years ago
- Ground: Stadion Sportkompleks Abdysh-Ata, Kant
- Capacity: 2,000
- Owner: Abdysh-Ata LLC
- Manager: Khurshit Lutfullaev
- League: Kyrgyz Premier League
- 2025: Kyrgyz Premier League, 3rd of 14
- Website: https://fcaa.kg/
Home colours	Away colours	Third colours

FC Abdysh-Ata (Kyrgyz: Абдыш-Ата футбол клубу) is a professional football club based in Kant, Kyrgyzstan. It is named after a local brewery. FC Nashe Pivo is their farm club. Its women's section plays in the Kyrgyzstan Women's League.

== Record ==
=== Domestic ===
Season	League									Kyrgyzstan Cup	Top goalscorer	
Season	Div.	Pos.	Pl.	W	D	L	GS	GA	P	Kyrgyzstan Cup	Name	League
2004	1st	5	36	14	4	18	63	75	46			
2005	1st	4	24	9	4	11	40	49	31			
2006	1st	2	10	7	3	0	16	2	24			
2007	1st	2	32	20	7	5	65	23	67	Winners		
2008	1st	2	16	12	3	1	48	5	39			
2009	1st	2	22	13	6	3	52	11	45	Winners		
2010	1st	3	20	11	6	3	63	21	39			
2011	1st	3	20	10	4	6	37	24	34	Winners	Anton Zemlianukhin; Almazbek Mirzaliev	7
2012	1st	5	28	13	8	7	51	21	47		Sergei Kaleutin	12
2013	1st	3	20	9	6	5	50	20	33	Semi-finals	Almazbek Mirzaliev	20
2014	1st	2	20	13	4	3	49	17	43	Runners-up	Cholponbek Esenkul Uulu	9
2015	1st	3	20	9	5	6	24	14	32	Winners	Farhat Musabekov; Aleriwa Oluwaseun	5
2016	1st	4	18	6	4	8	28	23	22	Semi-finals		
2017	c1st	2	20	12	2	6	35	19	38	Semi-finals	Aleriwa Oluwaseun	7
2018	1st	3	28	16	7	5	53	29	55	Semi-finals	Kamolidin Tashiev	6
2019	1st	5	28	11	2	15	41	59	35	Quarterfinal		
2020	1st	4	14	6	5	3	21	17	23	Runners-up	Maksat Alygulov	7
2021	1st	2	28	17	8	3	66	31	59	Quarterfinal	Mirbek Akhmataliev	17
2022	1st	1	27	18	6	3	62	16	60	?	Ernist Batyrkanov; Atay Dzhumashev	12
2023	1st	1	27	17	6	4	58	22	57	?	Emmanuel Yaghr	11

=== Continental ===
As of match played 31 October 2025

Competition	Pld	W	D	L	GF	GA
AFC Cup	10	7	2	1	27	11
AFC Challenge League	7	3	1	3	13	10
Total	17	10	3	4	40	21

Season	Competition	Round	Club	Home	Away	Aggregate
2023–24	AFC Cup	Group E	(Tajikistan) Ravshan Kulob	1–0	1–0	1st
2023–24	AFC Cup	Group E	(Turkmenistan) Altyn Asyr	3–0	4–2	1st
2023–24	AFC Cup	Group E	(Turkmenistan) Merw	8–3	1–1	1st
2023–24	AFC Cup	Inter-zone play-off semi-finals	(Chinese Taipei) Taichung Futuro	5–0	3–1	8–1
2023–24	AFC Cup	Inter-zone play-off final	(Australia) Central Coast Mariners	1–1	0–3	1–4
2024–25	AFC Challenge League	Group B	(Kuwait) Al-Arabi	1–0		3rd
2024–25	AFC Challenge League	Group B	(Turkmenistan) Arkadag	0–2		3rd
2024–25	AFC Challenge League	Group B	(Maldives) Maziya	3–0		3rd
2025–26	AFC Challenge League	Preliminary stage	(Syria) Hutteen	—N/a	5–2	5–2
2025–26	AFC Challenge League	Group A	(Turkmenistan) Altyn Asyr	0–1		3rd
2025–26	AFC Challenge League	Group A	(Oman) Al-Shabab	1–2		3rd
2025–26	AFC Challenge League	Group A	(Bhutan) Paro	3–3		3rd

== Logo ==
First club logo

== Honours ==
- Kyrgyz Premier League
  - Winners (3): 2022, 2023, 2024
- Kyrgyzstan Cup
  - Winners (5): 2007, 2009, 2011, 2015, 2022
- Kyrgyzstan Super Cup
  - Winners (1): 2016, 2025
- Ala-Too Cup
  - Winners (1): 2010

== Players ==
=== Current squad ===
As of 2 April, 2026

Note: Flags indicate national team as defined under FIFA eligibility rules; some limited exceptions apply. Players may hold more than one non-FIFA nationality.

No.	Pos.	Nation	Player
1	GK	KGZ	Oskon Baratov
3	DF	KGZ	Rauf Asinov
4	DF	KGZ	Sukhrob Berdiev
5	DF	KGZ	Asylbek Iskakov
6	MF	KGZ	Bayel Satybekov
7	MF	KGZ	Biymyrza Zhenishbekov
8	MF	KGZ	Kairat Kanatov
9	FW	KGZ	Suleyman Dzhumabekov
10	FW	KGZ	Erbol Abduzhaparov
11	FW	KGZ	Arsen Alybaev
13	GK	CPV	Tiago Gomes
19	MF	KGZ	Adilet Kanybekov

No.	Pos.	Nation	Player
21	DF	KGZ	Mukhtar Ishenaliev
22	MF	NGR	Williams Manji
23	DF	KGZ	Kairatbek Turusbek Uulu
25	FW	UZB	Nodirbek Bobomurodov
26	DF	KGZ	Chyngyz Subanov
27	FW	KGZ	Umar Talantbekov
33	DF	KGZ	Khasan Mukbilov
71	GK	KGZ	Sultan Beyshenaliev
77	DF	ITA	Pape Lo
88	MF	GHA	Elvis Sakyi
90	DF	RUS	Evgeniy Pleshko
92	MF	KGZ	Nurlan Sarykbaev
99	FW	ZAM	Enock Sakala

== Managerial history ==
- (Russia) Aleksandr Kalashnikov (2006)
- (Kyrgyzstan) Nematjan Zakirov (2007–08)
- (Netherlands) Ceylan Arikan (Feb 2009–10)
- (Kyrgyzstan) Murat Jumakeyev (interim) (2011)
- (Uzbekistan) Islam Akhmedov (2011)
- (Kyrgyzstan) Nematjan Zakirov (2011–12)
- (Uzbekistan) Islam Akhmedov (Jul 2012)
- (Kyrgyzstan) Mirlan Eshenov (2013–16)
- (Turkey) Eden Üüal (2025-

== See also ==
- FC Belovodskoye
- FC Abdysh-Ata-99
- FC Zhivoye Pivo
