= 2016 Kyrgyzstan Cup =

Tournament details
- Country: Kyrgyzstan

Final positions
- Champions: FC Dordoi Bishkek
- Runners-up: FC Alay

The 2016 Kyrgyzstan Cup was the 25th season of the Kyrgyzstan Cup knockout tournament. The cup winner qualified for the 2017 AFC Cup.

== Quarter-finals ==
[Jul 6]
Ala-Too            0-3 Abdish-Ata-2       
[Aug 3]
Alay               2-1 Abdish-Ata         
Alga               2-4 Dordoy             
Aldier             1-1 Alay-2             [3-5 pen]

== Semi-finals ==
First Legs
[Aug 7]
Alay-2             0-6 Alay               
[Aug 9]
Dordoy             5-0 Abdish-Ata-2       

Second Legs [Aug 14]
Alay               4-0 Alay-2             
Abdish-Ata-2       2-3 Dordoy

== Final ==
[Sep 18]
Dordoy             1-0 Alay               
  [David Tetteh 60]

== See also ==
- 2016 Kyrgyzstan League
