= 2018 Kyrgyzstan Cup =

Tournament details
- Country: Kyrgyzstan

Final positions
- Champions: FC Dordoi Bishkek
- Runners-up: FC Alay

Tournament statistics
- Matches played: 28
- Goals scored: 124 (4.43 per match)

The 2018 Kyrgyzstan Cup is the 27th season of the Kyrgyzstan Cup knockout tournament. The cup winner qualifies for the 2019 AFC Cup.

The draw of the tournament was held on 4 May 2018.

== Play-off round ==
=== First round ===
The first round matches were played on 10 May 2018.

| Team 1 | Score | Team 2 |
|---|---|---|
| Issyk-Kul | 1–3 | Yntymak |
| Ilbirs-2 | 1–2 | Semetei Talas |
| Birimdik | 3-1 | Kara-Balta-2 |
| Zheti-Oguz | 3–0 | Zhivoye |

=== Second round ===
Zone A matches were played on 16 May 2018.

| Team 1 | Score | Team 2 |
|---|---|---|
| Semetei Talas | 3-4 | Alga-2 |
| Yntymak | 3-0 | Alga-Chui |
| Zheti-Oguz | 1-10 | Abdysh-Ata-2 |
| Birimdik | 1-2 | Dordoi-2 |

Zone B matches were played on 22 May 2018.

| Team 1 | Score | Team 2 |
|---|---|---|
| Zhashtyk-Ak-Altyn | 0-3 | Akademija Osh-2 |
| Isfayram | 1-3 | Alay-2 |
| Neftçi-2 | 0-3 | Kok-Zhangak |
| Jalal-Abad | 3-0 | Shakhtar |

== Round of 16 ==
The Round of 16 matches were played between 27 and 28 June 2018.

| Team 1 | Score | Team 2 |
|---|---|---|
| Alay-2 | 1-0 | Akademija Osh |
| Jalal-Abad | 1-9 | Neftchi Kochkor-Ata |
| Kok-Zhangak | 1-3 | Kara-Balta-2 |
| Yntymak | 2-1 | Alga-Chui |
| Abdysh-Ata-2 | 2-0 | Ilbirs-2 |
| Alga-2 | 0-4 | Dordoi |
| Dordoi-2 | 1-0 | Abdysh-Ata-2 |
| Akademija Osh-2 | 2-6 | Alay |

=== Quarterfinals ===
The quarterfinals matches were played on 1 July 2018.

| Team 1 | Score | Team 2 |
|---|---|---|
| Abdysh-Ata-2 | 3-2 | Yntymak |
| Alay | 6-3 | Alay-2 |
| Kara-Balta-2 | 2-0 | Neftchi Kochkor-Ata |
| Dordoi | 11-0 | Dordoi-2 |

== Semifinals ==
The first legs were played on 4 July and the second were played on 18 July 2018.

| Team 1 | Agg. | Team 2 | 1st leg | 2nd leg |
|---|---|---|---|---|
| Dordoi (Kyrgyzstan) | 2-1 | (Kyrgyzstan) Abdysh-Ata-2 | 2-1 | 0-0 |
| Alay (Kyrgyzstan) | 6-2 | (Kyrgyzstan) Kara-Balta-2 | 2-1 | 4-1 |

=== Final ===
The final match of the Kyrgyzstan Cup 2018 was held on 6 October 2018 at the Dolen Omurzakov Stadium in Bishkek. The referee was Rysbek Shekerbekov.

| Team 1 | Score | Team 2 |
|---|---|---|
| Dordoi (Kyrgyzstan) | 3-2 | Alay |

== See also ==
- 2018 Kyrgyzstan League
