= 2018 Kyrgyzstan League =

Kyrgyzstan League
- Season: 2018
- Champions: Dordoi Bishkek
- AFC Cup: Dordoi Bishkek; Alay Osh
- Matches: 112
- Goals: 426 (3.8 per match)
- Top goalscorer: Joel Kojo (26)

The 2018 Kyrgyzstan League was the 27th season of the Kyrgyzstan League, Kyrgyzstan's top division of association football organized by the Football Federation of Kyrgyz Republic. The season started on 7 April 2018, with eight teams participating.

== Teams ==
Locations of teams in the 2018 Kyrgyzstan League

Note: Table lists in alphabetical order.

| Team | Location | Venue | Capacity | Manager | Captain |
|---|---|---|---|---|---|
| Abdysh-Ata Kant | Kant | Stadion Sportkompleks Abdysh-Ata | 3,000 | | |
| Akademija Osh | Osh | Suyumbayev Stadion | 11,200 | Khurshit Lutfullayev | |
| Alay Osh | Osh | Suyumbayev Stadion | 11,200 | | |
| Alga Bishkek | Bishkek | Dolen Omurzakov Stadium | 23,000 | | |
| Dordoi Bishkek | Bishkek | Dolen Omurzakov Stadium | 23,000 | Aleksandr Krestinin | |
| Ilbirs Bishkek | Bishkek | Stadium FC FFKR | 1,000 | | |
| Kara-Balta | Kara-Balta | Manas Stadium | 4,000 | | |
| Neftchi | Kochkor-Ata | Stadion Neftyannik Kochkor-Ata | 5,000 | | |

== League table ==
| Pos | Team | Pld | W | D | L | GF | GA | GD | Pts | Qualification or relegation |
|---|---|---|---|---|---|---|---|---|---|---|
| 1 | Dordoi Bishkek | 28 | 21 | 5 | 2 | 94 | 31 | +63 | 68 | AFC Cup group stage |
| 2 | Alay Osh | 28 | 18 | 6 | 4 | 79 | 35 | +44 | 60 (Note: On May 18, Alay had their six matches played in rounds 1 to 7 all awarded 0–3 forfeit losses against them for falsely registering an Uzbek player (Rasulbek Tashlankulov) as Kyrgyz citizen. This decision was revoked on July 22.) | AFC Cup play-off round |
| 3 | Abdysh-Ata Kant | 28 | 16 | 7 | 5 | 53 | 29 | +24 | 55 | |
| 4 | Neftchi Kochkorata | 28 | 14 | 5 | 9 | 47 | 40 | +7 | 47 | |
| 5 | Alga Bishkek | 28 | 13 | 7 | 8 | 51 | 35 | +16 | 46 | |
| 6 | Ilbirs Bishkek | 28 | 5 | 3 | 20 | 34 | 73 | −39 | 18 | |
| 7 | Kara-Balta | 28 | 4 | 1 | 23 | 38 | 91 | −53 | 13 | |
| 8 | Akademija Osh | 28 | 4 | 0 | 24 | 30 | 92 | −62 | 12 | |

Source: FIFA FLK
Rules for classification: 1) points; 2) goal difference; 3) number of goals scored.

== Results ==
=== First round ===
| Home \ Away | AAK | AKA | AOS | ABI | DBI | IBI | KAB | NEF |
|---|---|---|---|---|---|---|---|---|
| Abdysh-Ata | | 7–0 | 0–0 | 0–0 | 0–1 | 1–1 | 5–1 | 2–1 |
| Akademija Osh | 1–3 | | 2–5 | 0–5 | 2–5 | 1–3 | 3–4 | 1–2 |
| Alay Osh | 1–1 | 2–0 | | 3–0 | 2–3 | 3–1 | 6–2 | 0–0 |
| Alga Bishkek | 2–0 | 2–0 | 1–1 | | 0–0 | 5–0 | 5–1 | 0–0 |
| Dordoi Bishkek | 1–1 | 4–1 | 1–2 | 4–2 | | 7–1 | 2–0 | 2–2 |
| Ilbirs | 0–2 | 2–3 | 2–3 | 1–2 | 1–1 | | 3–2 | 2–3 |
| Kara-Balta | 2–2 | 3–1 | 5–6 | 2–5 | 0–6 | 1–0 | | 1–2 |
| Neftchi | 1–2 | 2–0 | 2–2 | 1–0 | 0–0 | 2–0 | 4–0 | |

Updated to match(es) played on 24 July 2018. Source: https://www.soccerway.com/kyrgyzstan/premier-liga-2018/results/
Legend: Blue = home team win; Yellow = draw; Red = away team win.

=== Second round ===
| Home \ Away | AAK | AKA | AOS | ABI | DBI | IBI | KAB | NEF |
|---|---|---|---|---|---|---|---|---|
| Abdysh-Ata | | 1–0 | 2–1 | 3–2 | 1–2 | 2–1 | 2–1 | 3–2 |
| Akademija Osh | 0–1 | | 1–6 | 0–2 | 0–8 | 1–0 | 3–1 | 0–2 |
| Alay Osh | 3–1 | 5–2 | | 0–0 | 0–2 | 2–1 | 9–0 | 2–1 |
| Alga Bishkek | 0–0 | 4–2 | 0–3 | | 0–7 | 1–1 | 4–0 | 5–1 |
| Dordoi Bishkek | 4–3 | 6–2 | 3–1 | 1–2 | | 6–1 | 3–1 | 4–2 |
| Ilbirs | 0–3 | 2–1 | 1–5 | 1–0 | 2–6 | | 4–2 | 0–1 |
| Kara-Balta | 1–2 | 2–3 | 0–1 | 0–1 | 1–3 | 3–2 | | 0–1 |
| Neftchi | 0–3 | 3–0 | 1–5 | 3–1 | 1–2 | 4–1 | 3–2 | |

Updated to match(es) played on 6 November 2018. Source: https://www.soccerway.com/kyrgyzstan/premier-liga-2018/results/
Legend: Blue = home team win; Yellow = draw; Red = away team win.

== Top scorers ==
As of Match played 6 November 2018

| Rank | Player | Club | Goals |
|---|---|---|---|
| 1 | (Ghana) Joel Kojo | Alay | 26 |
| 2 | (Afghanistan) Amredin Sharifi | Alay | 21 |
| 3 | (Kyrgyzstan) Ernist Batyrkanov | Dordoi | 17 |
| 4 | (Kyrgyzstan) Bekzhan Sagynbaev | Dordoi | 13 |
| 4 | (Kyrgyzstan) Kairat Zhyrgalbek Uulu | Dordoi | 13 |
| 4 | (Russia) Aziz Keldiar | Akademija Osh | 13 |
| 7 | (Turkmenistan) Serdaraly Ataýew | Alga | 12 |
| 7 | (Kyrgyzstan) Murolimzhon Akhmedov | Dordoi | 12 |
| 9 | (Kyrgyzstan) Ivan Filatov | Alga | 9 |
| 9 | (Kyrgyzstan) Tursunali Rustamov | Alga | 9 |
| 9 | (Kyrgyzstan) Otabek Khaidarov | Neftchi | 9 |
| 9 | (Kyrgyzstan) Umidullo Iminov | Neftchi | 9 |
| 9 | (Kyrgyzstan) Urmat Abdukaimov | Kara-Balta | 9 |
