= 2022 Kyrgyz Premier League =

Kyrgyz Premier League
- Season: 2022
- Dates: 5 March – 15 November 2022
- Champions: Abdysh-Ata Kant (1 title)
- Relegated: Kara-Balta
- AFC Cup: Abdysh-Ata Kant; Alay Osh
- Matches: 94
- Goals: 254 (2.7 per match)
- Biggest home win: Dordoi Bishkek 7–0 Kara-Balta
- Biggest away win: Alay 1–3 Nur-Batken; Alga Bishkek 1–3 Ilbirs Bishkek; Nur-Batken 1–3 Dordoi Bishkek
- Highest scoring: Dordoi Bishkek 7–0 Kara-Balta
- Longest winning run: Neftchi Kochkorata (3); Nur-Batken (3); Abdysh-Ata Kant (3)
- Longest unbeaten run: Abdysh-Ata Kant (6); Alga Bishkek (6)
- Longest winless run: Kara-Balta (9)
- Longest losing run: Kara-Balta (8)
- All statistics correct as of 28 September 2022.

The 2022 Kyrgyz Premier League is the 31st season of the Kyrgyzstan League, Kyrgyzstan's top division of association football organized by the Football Federation of Kyrgyz Republic.

== Teams ==
=== Team overview ===
Locations of teams in the 2021 Kyrgyz Premier League

Note: Table lists in alphabetical order.

Team	Location	Venue	Capacity
Abdysh-Ata Kant	Kant	Stadion Sportkompleks Abdysh-Ata	3,000
Alay Osh	Osh	Suyumbayev Stadion	11,200
Alga Bishkek	Bishkek	Dolen Omurzakov Stadium	23,000
Dordoi Bishkek	Bishkek	Dolen Omurzakov Stadium	23,000
Ilbirs Bishkek	Bishkek	Stadium FC FFKR	1,000
Kaganat	Osh	Suyumbayev Stadion	11,200
Kara-Balta	Kara-Balta	Manas Stadium	4,000
Neftchi	Kochkor-Ata	Stadion Neftyannik Kochkor-Ata	5,000
Nur-Batken	Batken	Zentralny Stadion	4,000
Talant	Kant	Sport City Stadion	1,500

=== Personnel and kits ===
Note: Flags indicate national team as has been defined under FIFA eligibility rules. Players and Managers may hold more than one non-FIFA nationality.

Team	Manager	Captain	Kit manufacturer	Shirt sponsor
Abdysh-Ata Kant	(Netherlands) Ceylan Arıkan	(Kyrgyzstan) Ernist Batyrkanov		
Alay Osh	(Kyrgyzstan) Mirlan Eshenov	(Kyrgyzstan) Akram Umarov		
Alga Bishkek	(Kyrgyzstan) Valeriy Berezovskiy	(Kyrgyzstan) Pavel Matyash		
Dordoi Bishkek	(Uzbekistan) Sergei Arslanov	(Kyrgyzstan) Bekzhan Sagynbaev	Kelme	
Ilbirs Bishkek	(Russia) Maksim Lisitsyn	(Kyrgyzstan) Arslan Bekberdinov		
Kaganat	(Kyrgyzstan) Aybek Tatanov	(Kyrgyzstan) Maksatbek Alimov		
Kara-Balta	(Kyrgyzstan) Vladimir Khoroshunov	(Kyrgyzstan) Stanislav Gerashchenko		
Neftchi	(Kyrgyzstan) Nurbek Zholdoshov	(Kyrgyzstan) Askarbek Saliev		
Nur-Batken	(Kyrgyzstan) Bakytbek Mamatov	(Kyrgyzstan) Murolimzhon Akhmedov		
Talant	(Kyrgyzstan) Tariel Abdukaimov	(Kyrgyzstan) Dzhazybay Abdukaimov		

=== Managerial changes ===
Team	Outgoing manager	Manner of departure	Date of vacancy	Position in table	Replaced by	Date of appointment	Position in table
Dordoi Bishkek	(Kyrgyzstan) Murat Dzhumakeyev	Resigned	26 May 2022		(Uzbekistan) Sergey Arslanov	28 May 2022	

== Foreign players ==
The number of foreign players is restricted to five per Kyrgyz Premier League team. A team can use only five foreign players on the field in each game.

Club	Player 1	Player 2	Player 3	Player 4	Player 5	Player 6	Player 7	AFC Players	Former Players
Abdysh-Ata Kant	(Kazakhstan) Artem Istrashkin	(Russia) Platon Shost	(Ukraine) Mykhaylo Kaluhin						
Alay Osh	(Ghana) Emmanuel Yaghr	(Ghana) Francis Yaghr	(Russia) Dmitri Ostrovski	(Russia) Andrei Zorin	(Uzbekistan) Sherzodbek Abduraimov	(Uzbekistan) Murodzhon Tuychibaev			
Alga Bishkek	(Kazakhstan) Raul Jalilov	(Nigeria) Oluwaseun Aleriwa							
Dordoi Bishkek	(Ghana) Joel Kojo	(Japan) Takuya Matsunaga	(Russia) Yury Nedashkovsky	(Uzbekistan) Timur Talipov					(Moldova) Maxim Focșa
Ilbirs Bishkek									
Kaganat	(Armenia) Erik Petrosyan	(Brazil) Rennan Saldanha	(Nigeria) David Ikpabi Candy	(Russia) Vadim Logunov	(Russia) Aleksandr Tuaev	(Uzbekistan) Sayidzhamol Davlatjonov	(Uzbekistan) Kemran Najafaliev	(Uzbekistan) Khasan Yuldoshev (Uzbekistan) Azamat Zhumabaev	
Kara-Balta									
Neftchi	(Belarus) Vladislav Fedosov	(Cameroon) Luc Mendjana	(Moldova) Mihail Paius	(Uzbekistan) Azamat Abdullaev					(Tajikistan) Jahongir Ergashev
Nur-Batken	(Russia) Alan Koroyev	(Uzbekistan) Sarvar Ablaev	(Uzbekistan) Jamshid Kobulov	(Uzbekistan) Mirzokhid Mamatkhonov	(Uzbekistan) Dostonzhon Rashidov	(Uzbekistan) Dilshodbek Umurzakov			(Uzbekistan) Timur Talipov
Talant	(Ghana) Emmanuel Armah	(Ghana) Cobblah Prince	(India) Abneet Bharti	(Russia) Ulanbek Narkozuev	(Russia) Anton Polev				

== League table ==
Pos	Team	Pld	W	D	L	GF	GA	GD	Pts	Qualification or relegation
1	Abdysh-Ata Kant (C)	27	18	6	3	62	16	+46	60	Qualification for AFC Cup group stage
2	Alay Osh	27	14	9	4	39	21	+18	51	Possible Qualification for AFC Cup group stage
3	Alga Bishkek	27	13	6	8	45	39	+6	45	
4	Dordoi Bishkek	27	12	8	7	45	30	+15	44	
5	Neftchi Kochkorata	27	12	7	8	42	28	+14	43	
6	Kaganat	27	9	10	8	31	34	−3	37	
7	Nur-Batken	27	10	5	12	32	39	−7	35	
8	Ilbirs Bishkek	27	7	8	12	24	29	−5	29	
9	Talant	27	4	9	14	26	41	−15	21	
10	Kara-Balta (R)	27	1	2	24	14	83	−69	5	Relegation to Second League

Source: KPFL
Rules for classification: 1) Points; 2) Head-to-head points; 3) Head-to-head goal difference; 4) Head-to-head goals scored; 5) Goal difference; 6) Goals scored.
(C) Champions; (R) Relegated

== Results ==
=== Round 1–18 ===
Home \ Away	ABD	ALA	ALG	DOR	ILB	KAG	KAR	NEF	NUR	TAL
Abdysh-Ata Kant	—	2–0	5–1	2–0	2–0	3–0	5–0	0–2	3–0	1–0
Alay Osh	1–1	—	0–0	2–1	1–1	2–2	1–0	0–0	1–3	1–0
Alga Bishkek	0–2	2–0	—	0–2	1–3	3–4	4–1	1–1	3–3	1–0
Dordoi Bishkek	0–1	1–2	1–1	—	2–2	3–1	7–0	1–3	1–0	1–1
Ilbirs Bishkek	0–1	1–3	1–2	1–1	—	1–0	1–0	3–1	1–1	2–0
Kaganat	0–0	1–1	0–3	2–3	0–0	—	1–1	0–3	4–1	2–1
Kara-Balta	1–8	0–4	0–2	1–4	1–2	1–2	—	0–6	1–2	1–1
Neftchi Kochkorata	1–2	2–3	1–0	1–1	1–0	1–1	1–0	—	4–1	1–1
Nur-Batken	1–0	0–4	0–0	1–3	1–0	0–1	2–0	1–0	—	2–2
Talant	1–1	0–1	3–3	0–0	0–0	0–2	4–1	1–2	0–2	—

Source: Flashscore
Legend: Blue = home team win; Yellow = draw; Red = away team win.

=== Round 19–27 ===
Home \ Away	ABD	ALA	ALG	DOR	ILB	KAG	KAR	NEF	NUR	TAL
Abdysh-Ata Kant	—	0–0	—	0–1	4–2	0–0	4–0	—	—	—
Alay Osh	—	—	1–0	—	—	—	4–0	2–1	2–0	2–1
Alga Bishkek	2–7	—	—	—	—	2–0	—	2–1	2–1	—
Dordoi Bishkek	—	2–1	1–2	—	—	—	2–1	—	2–1	1–2
Ilbirs Bishkek	—	0–0	1–2	0–2	—	—	—	—	—	2–0
Kaganat	—	0–0	—	1–1	1–0	—	—	—	—	1–1
Kara-Balta	—	—	0–2	—	1–0	1–4	—	—	—	0–2
Neftchi Kochkorata	0–0	—	—	1–1	1–0	0–1	4–2	—	—	—
Nur-Batken	0–3	—	—	—	0–0	2–0	4–0	3–1	—	—
Talant	3–5	—	0–4	—	—	—	—	1–2	1–0	—

Source: Flashscore
Legend: Blue = home team win; Yellow = draw; Red = away team win.

=== By match played ===
Team ╲ Round	1	2	3	4	5	6	7	8	9	10	11	12	13	14	15	16	17
Abdysh-Ata Kant	W	W	L	D	L	W	W	W	D	W	W	W	W				
Alay Osh	L	D	W	L	P	D	W	W	D	W	D	L	W				W
Alga Bishkek	W	L	L	W	D	D	D	W	D	L	L	L	W		W		
Dordoi Bishkek	D	D	W	W	D	L	W	L	W	L	P	D	L				
Ilbirs Bishkek	D	W	W	L	L	D	D	L	W	L	W	W	L		L	W	D
Kaganat	L	D	L	D	W	W	D	W	L	D	D	W	W				
Kara-Balta	L	L	L	L	P	L	L	L	L	D	L	L	L			D	L
Neftchi Kochkorata	W	L	W	W	W	D	L	D	D	W	P	D	W			L	
Nur-Batken	W	W	W	L	W	W	D	L	D	P	P	W	L				D
Talant	L	D	L	W	L	L	L	D	D	P	P	L	L			D	

Updated to match(es) played on 10 July 2022. Source:
W = Win; D = Draw; L = Loss; P = Postponed

== Season statistics ==
=== Top scorers ===
As of match played 10 November 2022

Rank	Player	Club	Goals
1	(Ghana) Emmanuel Yaghr	Alay	14
2	(Kyrgyzstan) Eldar Moldozhunusov	Neftchi	13
4	(Kyrgyzstan) Ernist Batyrkanov	Abdysh-Ata Kant	12
4	(Kyrgyzstan) Atay Dzhumashev	Abdysh-Ata Kant	12
5	(Kyrgyzstan) Suleyman Dzhumabekov	Talant	10
6	(Ghana) Joel Kojo	Dordoi Bishkek	8
6	(Kyrgyzstan) Kadyrbek Shaarbekov	Alga Bishkek	8
6	(Kyrgyzstan) Maksat Alygulov	Abdysh-Ata Kant	8
9	(Russia) Dmitri Ostrovski	Alay	7
9	(Kyrgyzstan) Raul Dzhalilov	Alga Bishkek	7
11	(Uzbekistan) Saidzhamol Davlatzhonov	Kaganat	6

=== Hat-tricks ===
Player	For	Against	Result	Date	Ref
(Kyrgyzstan) Ryskeldi Artykbaev	Dordoi Bishkek	Kara-Balta	7–0 (H)	25 April 2022	
(Kyrgyzstan) Atay Dzhumashev ^{4}	Abdysh-Ata Kant	Kara-Balta	8–1 (A)	18 July 2022	

- ^{4} Player scored 4 goals
