= Daniel Tagoe =

Kyrgyzstani footballer

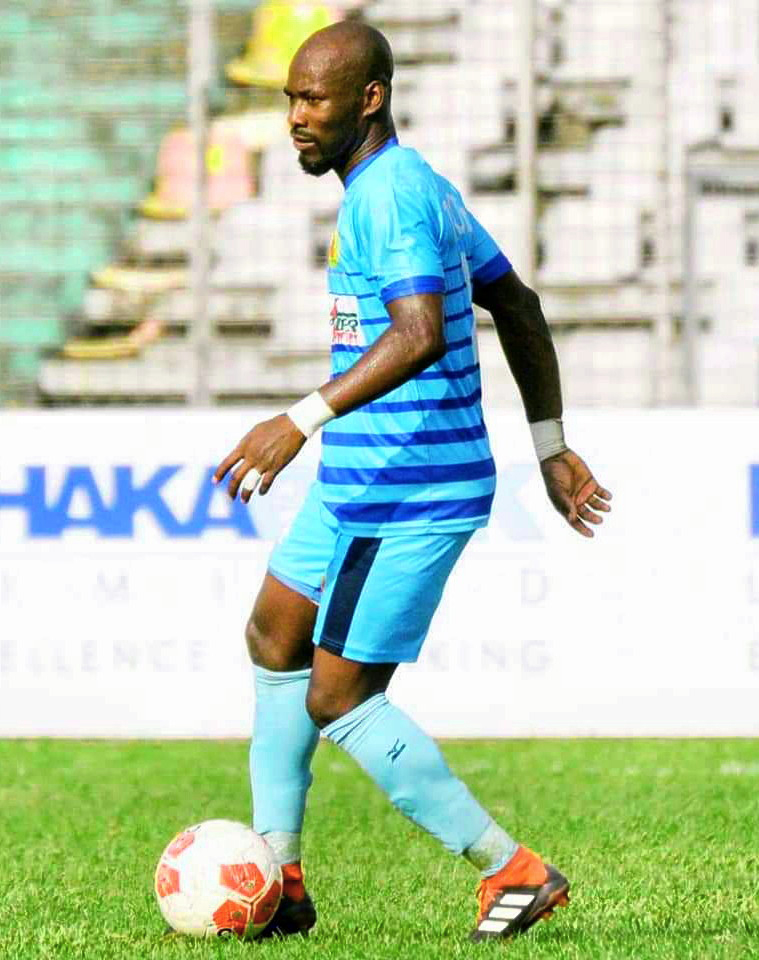
- Tagoe with Chittagong Abahani in 2019

Personal information
- Full name: Daniel Nii Armah Tagoe
- Date of birth: 3 March 1986 (age 40)
- Place of birth: Ghana
- Height: 1.78 m (5 ft 10 in)
- Position: Defender

Team information
- Current team: Dushanbe-83

Senior career*
Years	Team	Apps	(Gls)
2003–2005	Berekum Arsenal		
2005–2006	KAMAZ Moscow (amateur)		
2007–2016	Dordoi Bishkek	135	(7)
2016	Al-Hala		
2016–2018	Dordoi Bishkek	39	(5)
2018–2019	Chittagong Abahani Ltd.	23	(2)
2020	Shan United FC	11	(1)
2020	Alay Osh		
2021–	Dushanbe-83	1	(0)

International career^{‡}
2014–	Kyrgyzstan	21	(0)
- * Club domestic league appearances and goals as of 3 May 2021 ‡ National team caps and goals as of 11 January 2019

Daniel Nii Armah Tagoe (born 3 March 1986) is a professional footballer who plays as a defender for Dushanbe-83 in the Tajikistan Higher League. Born in Ghana, he has been a played for the Kyrgyzstan national football team.

== Club career ==
The Ghanaian-born Tagoe started his career for local side Eleven Stoppers and played later for Dansoman United. In 2005 went to Russia to sign for Tatarstan based club KAMAZ Naberezhnye Chelny. After two years in Russia, he went to Dordoi Bishkek where he played five seasons and acquired Kyrgyzstani citizenship. In 2009, he won the best Kyrgyzstan Player of the Year award, as the 23-year-old was instrumental to Dordoi Bishkek success that season. At the start of 2010, Tagoe and David Tetteh looked at moving to Tajik League club Vakhsh Qurghonteppa, but ultimately returned to Dordoi Bishkek, how claimed they had a valid contract until 2012.

On 30 August 2016, Tagoe signed for Al-Hala in the Bahraini Premier League, returning to Dordoi Bishkek in December 2016, signing a two-year contract with the club.

In November 2017, Tagoe and Pavel Sidorenko earned their AFC 'C' coaching diploma.

On 26 October 2018, Tagoe signed a one-year contract with Bangladesh Premier League club Chittagong Abahani Limited.

On 26 March 2021, Tagoe signed for Tajikistan Higher League club Dushanbe-83.

== International career ==
Tagoe made his debut for the Kyrgyzstan national team on 12 May 2014 in a friendly against Afghanistan, joining fellow Africans David Tetteh, Elijah Ari and Claude Maka Kum as African-born players representing Kyrgyzstan on the international stage.

== Personal life ==
Tagoe is the son of the Crown Prince of a Ghanaian tribe. In October 2015, he married his Kyrgyz girlfriend Elnura Orozbaeva, with their first child born in August 2016.

== Career statistics ==
=== International ===
Kyrgyzstan national team
Year	Apps	Goals
2014	5	0
2015	4	0
2016	4	0
2017	1	0
2018	5	0
2019	2	0
Total	21	0

Statistics accurate as of match played 11 January 2019

== Honours ==
=== Club ===
Dordoi Bishkek

- Kyrgyzstan League (6); 2007, 2008, 2009, 2011, 2012, 2014
- Kyrgyzstan Cup (4): 2008, 2010, 2012, 2014
- Kyrgyzstan Super Cup (4): 2011, 2012, 2013, 2014
- AFC President's Cup (1): 2007

Chittagong Abahani

- Sheikh Kamal International Club Cup (1): runner-up 2019

== See also ==
- Kyrgyzstan men's international footballers
