= 2017 Kyrgyzstan Cup =

Tournament details
- Country: Kyrgyzstan

Final positions
- Champions: FC Dordoi Bishkek
- Runners-up: FC Alay

The 2017 Kyrgyzstan Cup is the 26th season of the Kyrgyzstan Cup knockout tournament. The cup winner qualifies for the 2018 AFC Cup.

The draw of the tournament was held on 4 May 2017.

== Round 1 ==
17 May 2017

"Bostery" (Issyk-Kul) - "Alga-Chui" (Tokmok) 1: 4

"Birimdik" (Sokuluk) - "Kara-Balta-2" (Kara-Balta) 1: 1 Penalty 2: 4

"Yntymak" (Ysyk-Kul) - RUOR (Bishkek) 3: 1

"Semeteus" (Talas) - "Alive" (Kant) 3: 2

"Kok-Zhangak" (Kok-Zhangak) - "Mailuu-Suu" (Mailuu-Suu) 0: 0 Penalty 2: 4

"Bazar-Korgon" (Bazar-Korgon) - "Neftchi-2" (Kochkor-Ata) 3: 0

"Toktogul" (Toktogul) - "Tash-Kumyr" (Tash-Kumyr) 3: 0 (Tech.)

"Batken City" (Batken) - "Aidarken" (Aidarken) 3: 0 (Tech.)

== Round 2 ==
23 May 2017

Semetej - Abdysh-Ata-2 1: 2

24 May 2017

"Intymak" - "Dordoi 2" 1: 5

"Kara-Balta-2" - "Our" 0: 5

Alga-Chui - Alga-2 2: 0

"Toktogul" - "Energetic" 0: 3 (Tech.)

"Bazar-Korgon" - "Dostuk" 0: 3 (Tech.)

"Mailuu-Suu" - "Jalal-Abad" 3: 0 (Tech.)

25 May 2017

"Batken City" - "Shakhtar" 3: 0 (Tech.)

== Round 3 ==
3 June 2017

"Our" - "Dordoi" 0: 3

"Abdysh-Ata-2" - "Abdysh-Ata" 0: 2

"Mailuu-Suu" - "Alai" 0: 5

4 June 2017

"Alga-Chui" - "Kara-Balta" 1: 3

"Dordoi-2" - "Alga" 2: 1

Energetik - Neftchi 0: 5

Dostuk - Aldier 3: 0 (Tech.)

"Batken City" - "Alay-2." 0: 3 (Tech.)

== Quarter-finals ==
14 June 2017

"Alay-2" - "Alay" 5:10

26 July 2017

"Neftchi" - "Dostuk" 10: 2

"Abdysh-Ata" - "Dordoi-2" 3: 2

27 July 2017

"Dordoi" - "Kara-Balta" 2: 0

== Semifinals ==
The four winners from the Quarterfinals were drawn into two two-legged ties.

9 August 2017 1st leg	Dordoi Bishkek	2 – 1	Abdysh-Ata Kant	Bishkek
17:30 KGT (UTC+6)	Shamshiev 50'; A.Azizov 70'	Report	Filatov 30'	Stadium: Dolen Omurzakov Stadium

16 August 2017 2nd leg	Abdysh-Ata Kant	1 – 1 (2 – 3 agg.)	Dordoi Bishkek	Kant
17:30 KGT (UTC+6)	Zhutanov 45'	Report	Sidorenko 10'	Stadium: Stadion Sportkompleks Abdysh-Ata

9 August 2017 1st leg	Neftchi Kochkor-Ata	3 – 1	Alay Osh	Kochkor-Ata
17:30 KGT (UTC+6)	N.Zholdoshov 10'; T.Mazhidov 15'; A.Malikov 20'	Report	A.Umarov 25'	Stadium: Stadion Neftyannik Kochkor-Ata

16 August 2017 2nd leg	Alay Osh	6 – 1 (7 – 4 agg.)	Neftchi Kochkor-Ata	Osh
17:30 KGT (UTC+6)	Akhmedov 5'; M.Alimov 6'; Verevkin 45'; U.Tokhtasinov 86'; Abdurakhmanov 88', 90'	Report	A.Tukhtasinov 26'	Stadium: Suyumbayev Stadion

== Final ==
23 September 2017
19:30 UTC+6

FC Dordoi Bishkek	0–0 (a.e.t.)	FC Alay
	Report
Penalties
	4–3

Dolen Omurzakov Stadium, Bishkek
Referee: Nurgazy Cholponbaev

== See also ==
- 2017 Kyrgyzstan League
