= Vladimir Verevkin =

Kyrgyzstani footballer (born 1987)

Personal information
- Full name: Vladimir Verevkin
- Date of birth: 8 May 1987 (age 39)
- Place of birth: Bishkek, Kyrgyzstan
- Height: 1.81 m (5 ft 11 in)
- Position: Striker

Senior career*
Years	Team	Apps	(Gls)
2004	Molodezhnaya Sbornaya (Note: Affiliated with the Kyrgyzstan U20 national team.)	17	(3)
2004–2009	Abdysh-Ata Kant	15+	(20+)
2006	→ Muras-Sport Bishkek (loan)		(8)
2007	→ Aviator AAL Bishkek (loan)		(2)
2007	→ Dordoy-Dinamo Naryn (loan)		(1)
2010–2013	Alga Bishkek		(23)
2013–2019	Alay Osh		(31)
2015	→ Khayr Vahdat (loan)		
2016	→ FC Abdysh-Ata Kant (loan)		(1)

International career
2006–2014	Kyrgyzstan	8	(1)
- * Club domestic league appearances and goals

Vladimir Verevkin (Russian: Владимир Верёвкин; born 8 May 1987) is a Kyrgyzstani footballer who was banned for life from playing football in August 2019.

== Career ==
=== Club ===
On 2 August 2019, the Asian Football Confederation announced that Verevkin had been banned for life for his involvement in a conspiracy to manipulate matches during Alay Osh's 2017 AFC Cup and 2018 AFC Cup campaign.

=== International ===
In the group stage of the 2006 AFC Challenge Cup, held in Bangladesh, Verevkin scored the opening goal to give Kyrgyzstan a 1–0 lead. The goal was important for Kyrgyzstan to get back on track after losing its opening game. However, Verevkin's goal never counted because the match was abandoned in the 76th minute due to heavy rain. The match was replayed from the begin on 7 April, which Kyrgyzstan won 2–0.

In the 2014 AFC Challenge Cup, Verevkin scored the only goal of the match against Myanmar, but the 1–0 victory was not enough to prevent Kyrgyzstan from being eliminated.

== Career statistics ==
=== Club ===
Only partial league statistics are known.

Appearances and goals by club, season and competition
Club	Season	League		
Club	Season	Division	Apps	Goals
Molodezhnaya Sbornaya	2004	Kyrgyzstan League	17	3
Abdysh-Ata Kant	2004	Kyrgyzstan League	15	8
Abdysh-Ata Kant	2005	Kyrgyzstan League	?	9
Abdysh-Ata Kant	2006	Kyrgyzstan League	0	0
Abdysh-Ata Kant	2007	Kyrgyzstan League	0	0
Abdysh-Ata Kant	2008	Kyrgyzstan League	?	3
Abdysh-Ata Kant	2009	Kyrgyzstan League	?	?
Muras-Sport Bishkek (loan)	2006	Kyrgyzstan League	?	8
Aviator-AAL Bishkek (loan)	2007	Kyrgyzstan League	?	2
Dordoy-Dinamo Naryn (loan)	2007	Kyrgyzstan League	?	1
Alga Bishkek	2010	Kyrgyzstan League	?	3
Alga Bishkek	2011	Kyrgyzstan League	?	12
Alga Bishkek	2012	Kyrgyzstan League	?	8
Alay Osh	2013	Kyrgyzstan League	?	10
Alay Osh	2014	Kyrgyzstan League	?	10
Alay Osh	2015	Kyrgyzstan League	0	0
Alay Osh	2016	Kyrgyzstan League	?	1
Alay Osh	2017	Kyrgyzstan League	?	6
Alay Osh	2018	Kyrgyzstan League	?	4
Alay Osh	2019	Kyrgyz Premier League	0	0
Khayr Vahdat (loan)	2015	Tajik League	?	?
Abdysh-Ata Kant (loan)	2015	Kyrgyzstan League	?	1
Career total			32+	89+

=== International ===
Appearances and goals by national team and year
National team	Year	Apps	Goals
Kyrgyzstan	2006	5	0
Kyrgyzstan	2007	0	0
Kyrgyzstan	2008	0	0
Kyrgyzstan	2009	0	0
Kyrgyzstan	2010	0	0
Kyrgyzstan	2011	0	0
Kyrgyzstan	2012	0	0
Kyrgyzstan	2013	0	0
Kyrgyzstan	2014	3	1
Total		8	1

Scores and results list Kyrgyzstan's goal tally first.

No	Date	Venue	Opponent	Score	Result	Competition
1.	23 May 2014	Addu Football Stadium, Addu City, Maldives	Myanmar	1–0	1–0	2014 AFC Challenge Cup

== Honours ==
Abdysh-Ata Kant

- Kyrgyzstan League: runner-up 2006, 2007, 2008, 2009
- Kyrgyzstan Cup: 2007, 2009

Dordoy-Dinamo Naryn

- Kyrgyzstan League: 2007

Alga Bishkek

- Kyrgyzstan League: runner-up 2012
- Kyrgyzstan Cup: runner-up 2012

Alay Osh

- Kyrgyzstan League: 2013, 2016, 2017; runner-up 2018
- Kyrgyzstan Cup: 2013; runner-up 2016, 2017, 2018
- Kyrgyzstan Super Cup: 2017, 2018

Individual

- Kyrgyzstan League top goalscorer (12 goals): 2011
