= Timur Talipov =

Serbian footballer

Personal information
- Date of birth: 18 May 1995 (age 31)
- Height: 1.84 m (6 ft 0 in)
- Position: Defender

Team information
- Current team: Tanjong Pagar United
- Number: 19

Youth career
- 2014–2016: Pakhtakor U18
- 2014: → NBU Osiyo (loan)

Senior career*
Years	Team	Apps	(Gls)
2016–2017	Pakhtakor	16	(0)
2017	Obod	7	(1)
2019–2021	Alay	30	(7)
2021	Kaganat	11	(0)
2021	Alay	13	(1)
2022	Nur-Batken	10	(3)
2022	Dordoi Bishkek	11	(1)
2022–23	Sheikh Russel KC	15	(1)
2023	Neftchi Kochkor-Ata	10	(0)
2024–	Tanjong Pagar United	26	(1)

International career
2015	Uzbekistan U20	8	(2)
- * Club domestic league appearances and goals as of 5 January 2024

Timur Talipov (born 18 May 1995) is an Uzbekistani footballer who plays as a defender for Singapore Premier League side Tanjong Pagar United

== Club career ==
=== Pakhtakor ===
Talipov started his career at Pakhtakor where in 2016, he earned a promotion to the senior squad for the club. Talipov made his official debut for the club during the 2016 AFC Champions League group stage match against UAE side Al-Jazira in which he also scored a goal 24 minute into his debut.

=== Obod ===
On 17 July 2017, Talipov joined another Tashkent based club, Obod. He scored his first goal for the club in a league match on 19 August 2017 against FK Buxoro.

=== Alay ===
After being a free agent for nearly one year, on 7 February 2019, Talipov joined Kyrgyzstan club, Alay in 2019 and stayed for two seasons.

=== Kaganat ===
On 7 March 2021, Talipov signed for Kaganat in 2021 and appeared for 11 times.

=== Returned to Alay ===
On 10 July 2021, Talipov returned to Alay in 2021 during the mid-season and appeared for 13 times and scoring a goal.

=== Nur-Batken ===
On 1 March 2022, Talipov signed for Nur-Batken in 2022 and appeared for 10 times and scoring 3 goals before moving to FC Dordoi Bishkek in mid-season.

=== Dordoi Bishkek ===
On 16 July 2022, Talipov signed for Dordoi Bishkek in 2022 and appeared for 11 times and scoring a goal. He helped the club to win the 2021 Kyrgyzstan Super Cup.

=== Sheikh Russel KC ===
On 1 December 2022, Talipov joined Bangladesh club Sheikh Russel KC for the 2022–23 Bangladesh Premier League season as it was reported he was signed as a new player for the team.

=== Neftchi Kochkor-Ata ===
On 16 July 2023, Talipov signed for Neftchi Kochkor-Ata and won the Kyrgyz Cup with the team.

=== Tanjong Pagar United ===
On 15 March 2024, Talipov was announced as a new player for Singapore Premier League side Tanjong Pagar United ahead of the 2024–25 season.

== Career statistics ==
As of match played 19 March 2024

Club	Season	League			Cup		Continental		Other		Total	
Club	Season	Division	Apps	Goals	Apps	Goals	Apps	Goals	Apps	Goals	Apps	Goals
Pakhtakor	2016	Uzbek League	16	0	0	0	0	0	1	1	17	1
Pakhtakor	Total		16	0	0	0	0	0	1	1	17	1
Obod	2017	Uzbek League	7	1	0	0	0	0	0	0	7	1
Obod	Total		7	1	0	0	0	0	0	0	7	1
Alay	2019	Kyrgyz Premier League	23	3	0	0	2	0	0	0	25	3
Alay	2020	Kyrgyz Premier League	7	4	3	0	0	0	0	0	10	4
Alay	Total		30	7	3	0	2	0	0	0	35	7
Kaganat	2021	Kyrgyz Premier League	11	0	0	0	0	0	0	0	11	0
Kaganat	Total		11	0	0	0	0	0	0	0	11	0
Alay	2021	Kyrgyz Premier League	13	1	0	0	0	0	0	0	13	1
Alay	Total		13	1	0	0	0	0	0	0	13	1
Nur-Batken	2022	Kyrgyz Premier League	10	3	0	0	0	0	0	0	10	3
Nur-Batken	Total		10	3	0	0	0	0	0	0	10	3
Dordoi Bishkek	2022	Kyrgyz Premier League	11	1	0	0	0	0	0	0	11	1
Dordoi Bishkek	Total		11	1	0	0	0	0	0	0	11	1
Sheikh Russel KC	2022–23	Bangladesh Premier League	15	1	4	0	0	0	0	0	19	1
Sheikh Russel KC	Total		15	1	4	0	0	0	0	0	19	1
Neftchi Kochkor-Ata	2023	Kyrgyz Premier League	10	0	0	0	0	0	0	0	10	0
Neftchi Kochkor-Ata	Total		10	0	0	0	0	0	0	0	10	0
Tanjong Pagar United	2024–25	Singapore Premier League	22	1	4	0	0	0	0	0	26	1
Tanjong Pagar United	Total		22	1	4	0	0	0	0	0	26	1
Career total			145	15	11	0	2	0	1	1	159	16

== Honours ==
=== Club ===
==== Dordoi Bishkek ====
- Kyrgyzstan Super Cup: 2021
