= 2014 Kyrgyzstan League Second Level =

Kyrgyzstan League Second Level
- Season: 2014
- Champions: Kara Balta
- Relegated: Dordoi Plaza
- Top goalscorer: Nurlan Ibragimzhan Uulu (14); Kara Balta

The 2014 Kyrgyzstan League is the 23rd season of Kyrgyzstan League, the Football Federation of Kyrgyz Republic's top division of association football. Alay Osh are the defending champions, having won the previous season. The season will start on 21 March 2014.

== League table ==
=== Zone A ===
| Pos | Team | Pld | W | D | L | GF | GA | GD | Pts |
|---|---|---|---|---|---|---|---|---|---|
| 1 | Kara Balta (C) | 16 | 11 | 5 | 0 | 45 | 17 | +28 | 38 |
| 2 | FC Nashe Pivo | 16 | 11 | 4 | 1 | 48 | 12 | +36 | 37 |
| 3 | Belovodsk | 16 | 11 | 1 | 4 | 48 | 24 | +24 | 34 |
| 4 | FC Zhivoe Pivo | 16 | 8 | 1 | 7 | 27 | 25 | +2 | 25 |
| 5 | Alga 2 | 16 | 7 | 3 | 6 | 34 | 32 | +2 | 24 |
| 6 | Vetka | 15 | 4 | 3 | 8 | 33 | 43 | −10 | 15 |
| 7 | Dordoi 2 | 16 | 3 | 2 | 11 | 24 | 37 | −13 | 11 |
| 8 | Manas 2 | 16 | 3 | 2 | 11 | 24 | 51 | −27 | 11 |
| 9 | Dordoi Plaza | 16 | 2 | 1 | 13 | 16 | 68 | −52 | 7 |

Updated to match(es) played on 9 November 2014. Source: Soccernet.ee
Rules for classification: 1) points; 2) goal difference; 3) number of goals scored.
(C) Champions

=== Zone B ===
| Pos | Team | Pld | W | D | L | GF | GA | GD | Pts |
|---|---|---|---|---|---|---|---|---|---|
| 1 | Kara-Shoro (C) | 14 | 10 | 4 | 0 | 40 | 17 | +23 | 34 |
| 2 | Energetik Karaköl | 14 | 9 | 2 | 3 | 41 | 23 | +18 | 29 |
| 3 | Shakhtyor | 14 | 8 | 2 | 4 | 45 | 24 | +21 | 26 |
| 4 | Alay 2 | 14 | 7 | 2 | 5 | 31 | 41 | −10 | 23 |
| 5 | Jalal Abad | 14 | 5 | 1 | 8 | 32 | 41 | −9 | 16 |
| 6 | Toktogul | 14 | 5 | 1 | 8 | 32 | 43 | −11 | 16 |
| 7 | Neftchi 2 | 14 | 4 | 2 | 8 | 26 | 36 | −10 | 14 |
| 8 | Aldier 2 | 14 | 1 | 0 | 13 | 11 | 43 | −32 | 3 |

Updated to match(es) played on 9 November 2014. Source: Soccernet.ee
Rules for classification: 1) points; 2) goal difference; 3) number of goals scored.
(C) Champions

== Play off ==
| 5 November | Kara Shoro | 1-5 | Kara Balta | Kochkor-Ata |
| | Khakimzhon Uulu 27'; Kamalov (yellow card) | Report | Dzhakybaev 11,66'; Adeshina 20' (yellow card); Khoroshunov 42'; Kovalev 76' | Stadium: Neftyanik; Attendance: 1200 |

| 9 November | Kara Balta | 7-4 | Kara-Shoro | Kara-Balta |
| | Dzhakybaev 5'; Aleriwa 11,54' (yellow card); Khoroshunov 35'; Kistaubaev 39'; Kovalev 55'; Kurmanbek Uulu 70' | Report | Madaminov 48'; Khakimzhon Uulu 67,73,88'; Tokhtakhun Uulu (yellow card) | Stadium: SC Kara Balta; Attendance: 1000; Referee: Rysbek Shekerbaev |

== Statistics ==
=== Top scorers ===
Zone A

| Rank | Player | Club | Goals |
|---|---|---|---|
| 1 | (Kyrgyzstan) I.Gavshin | Nashe Pivo | 13 |
| 2 | (Kyrgyzstan) A.Abduraimov | Vetka | 12 |
| 3 | (Kyrgyzstan) Dzhakybaev | Kara-Balta | 10 |
| 4 | (Nigeria) Aleriwa Oluwatosin | Kara-Balta | 8 |
| 5 | (Kyrgyzstan) Roman Levchenko | Belovodsk | 7 |

Zone B

| Rank | Player | Club | Goals |
|---|---|---|---|
| 1 | (Kyrgyzstan) Ibragimzhan Uulu | Toktogul | 14 |
| 2 | (Kyrgyzstan) S.Mojdunjanov | Jalal Abad | 11 |
| 3 | (Kyrgyzstan) A.Zakirov | Shakhtyor | 9 |
