= Marat Jumakeyev =

Kyrgyzstani footballer and manager

Personal information
- Date of birth: 27 November 1973 (age 52)
- Place of birth: Kyrgyzstan, USSR
- Height: 1.84 m (6 ft 1/2 in)
- Position: Defender

Senior career*
Years	Team	Apps	(Gls)
1991–1993	FC Alga Bishkek	48	(0)
1994–1996	FC Kainar	92	(4)
1997	Alga-PVO Bishkek	17	(0)
1998	FC Astana Aqmola	25	(0)
2000	CSKA-Kairat	20	(3)
2001	Mangystau Aktau	11	(0)
2001–2005	SKA-PVO/SKA Shoro Bishkek	>8	(1)

International career
1992–2001	Kyrgyzstan	25	(0)

Managerial career
- 2013: FC Issyk-Kol Karakol
- 2014–: FC Manas
- * Club domestic league appearances and goals

Marat Jumakeyev (Russian: Марат Абдукашевич Джумакеев; born 27 November 1973 in USSR) is a Kyrgyzstani professional football player and manager.

== Career ==
In 1991 Jumakeyev began his professional career with the FC Alga Bishkek. In 1994–1996 he played for the FC Kainar, and in 1997 he returned to Alga-PVO Bishkek. The following year he went back to Kazakhstan, where he defended the colors of clubs FC Astana Aqmola, CSKA-Kairat and Mangystau Aktau. In summer 2001 he once more returned to Alga-PVO Bishkek and played until the club dissolved.

In 1992, he made his debut for the Kyrgyzstan national team.

In 2011, he completed coaching license courses at the Asian Football Confederation. In 2013, he coached FC Issyk-Kol Karakol. Since 2014, he has been a coach of the FC Manas.
