= 2015 Kyrgyzstan First League =

Kyrgyzstan First League
- Season: 2015

The 2015 Kyrgyzstan First League is the 24th season of Kyrgyzstan League, the Football Federation of Kyrgyz Republic's top division of association football. Alay Osh are the defending champions, having won the previous season. The season will start on 21 March 2014.

== League tables ==
Zone A

Pos	Team	Pld	W	D	L	GF	GA	GD	Pts
1	Kara Balta (C)	8	7	1	0	24	7	+17	22
2	FC Nashe Pivo	8	7	0	1	25	9	+16	21
3	Alga 2	8	3	3	2	7	5	+2	12
4	FC Zhivoe Pivo	8	4	0	4	26	14	+12	12
5	Dordoi 2	8	3	1	4	17	16	+1	10
6	Belovodsk	8	3	1	4	12	13	−1	10
7	Abdish-ata-99	8	2	2	4	16	25	−9	8
8	RSDYUSHOR FC	8	1	1	6	5	30	−25	4
9	Alga Chuy	8	1	1	6	10	18	−8	4

Updated to match(es) played on 28 July 2015. Source: Soccernet.ee
Rules for classification: 1) points; 2) goal difference; 3) number of goals scored.
(C) Champions

Zone B

Pos	Team	Pld	W	D	L	GF	GA	GD	Pts
1	Aldiyer Kurshab (C)	7	6	1	0	23	8	+15	19
2	Kara-Suu	7	5	0	2	21	7	+14	15
3	Energetik Karaköl	7	3	3	1	45	24	+21	12
4	Neftchi	7	3	2	2	7	8	−1	11
5	Shakhtyor	7	3	0	4	16	17	−1	9
6	Jalal Abad FC	7	2	1	4	10	18	−8	7
7	Alay 2	7	1	1	5	12	18	−6	4
8	Toktogul	7	1	0	6	14	29	−15	3

Updated to match(es) played on 28 July 2015. Source: Soccernet.ee
Rules for classification: 1) points; 2) goal difference; 3) number of goals scored.
(C) Champions
