= Branislav Stanić =

Serbian footballer

Personal information
- Full name: Branislav Stanić
- Date of birth: 30 July 1988 (age 38)
- Place of birth: Brus, SFR Yugoslavia
- Height: 1.79 m (5 ft 10 in)
- Position: Midfielder

Youth career
- Partizan

Senior career*
Years	Team	Apps	(Gls)
2006–2010	Partizan	1	(0)
2006–2009	→ Teleoptik (loan)	88	(4)
2010	→ Hajduk Kula (loan)	8	(0)
2010–2012	Smederevo	39	(1)
2012–2013	Novi Pazar	17	(0)
2014	Dordoi Bishkek	12	(3)
2014	Zlaté Moravce	2	(0)
2015	Rad	6	(0)
2016	Kolubara	21	(1)
2017	Sloboda Užice	11	(0)
Total		205	(9)
- * Club domestic league appearances and goals as of 12 March 2019

Branislav Stanić (Serbian Cyrillic: Бранислав Станић; born 30 July 1988) is a Serbian retired footballer who plays as a midfielder.

== Career ==
After coming through the youth system of Partizan, Stanić signed his first professional contract with the club in July 2007, on a five-year deal. He made one league appearance for Partizan in the title-winning 2007–08 season.

In early 2014, Stanić moved to Kyrgyzstan League side Dordoi Bishkek, winning one trophy with the club, the Kyrgyzstan Super Cup, on 24 March 2014.

== Honours ==
Dordoi Bishkek

- Kyrgyzstan Super Cup: 2014
