= Giancarlo Previato =

Brazilian footballer (born 1993)

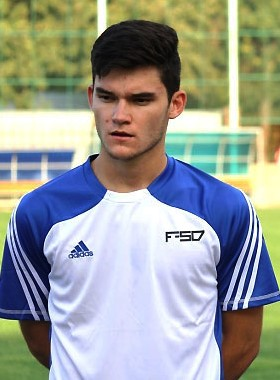

Personal information
- Full name: Giancarlo Israel Previato
- Date of birth: 14 May 1993 (age 33)
- Place of birth: Ribeirão Preto, Brazil
- Height: 1.70 m (5 ft 7 in)
- Position: Midfielder

Team information
- Current team: São Bento

Youth career
- Olé Brasil

Senior career*
| Years | Team | Apps | (Gls) |
| 2010–2013 | Olé Brasil | 18 | (3) |
| 2011–2013 | → Dordoi Bishkek (loan) | 40 | (19) |
| 2013–2014 | Sumy | 9 | (0) |
| 2014–2015 | Dordoi Bishkek | 6 | (2) |
| 2016 | Caldense | 1 | (0) |
| 2016 | Rio Branco | 16 | (3) |
| 2017 | Botafogo FC | 0 | (0) |
| 2018 | Portuguesa | 5 | (0) |
| 2018 | Inter de Lages | 11 | (1) |
| 2019–2020 | Atibaia | 20 | (2) |
| 2021 | Rio Claro | 18 | (1) |
| 2021–2022 | Santo André | 15 | (1) |
| 2022– | São Bento | 0 | (0) |
- * Club domestic league appearances and goals as of 1 February 2022

Giancarlo Israel Previato, also known as Giancarlo Previato or simply Gian (born May 14, 1993 in Ribeirão Preto, Brazil), is a Brazilian professional football player, who plays for São Bento.

== Career ==
Previato is an attacking midfielder who began his career in Olé Brasil, a club from his hometown Ribeirão Preto. In 2011, he got transferred to Dordoi Bishkek, of the Kyrgyzstan League, through an 18-month loan deal. During his time with Dordoi Bishkek, Previato won the local league twice, the Cup once and the Super Cup once as well. He scored in the finals of the two latter tournaments.

On 24 October 2013, Previato signed with Sumy, of the Ukrainian First League.

During the summer of 2014, Previato left Sumy claiming they had not fulfilled their obligations. Following his release, Previato rejected a contract from Olimpik Donetsk, returning to Brazil to train with Botafogo before re-signing with former club Dordoi Bishkek.

== Honours ==
=== Club ===
Dordoi Bishkek

- Kyrgyzstan League Winner (2): 2011, 2012, 2014
- Kyrgyzstan Cup Winner (2): 2012, 2014
- Kyrgyzstan Super Cup Winner (1): 2012
