= 2014 Kyrgyzstan League =

Kyrgyzstan League
- Season: 2014
- Champions: Dordoi Bishkek
- Relegated: Manas
- AFC Cup: Dordoi Bishkek
- Matches: 80
- Goals: 271 (3.39 per match)
- Top goalscorer: Kaleemullah (18)
- Biggest home win: Dordoi Bishkek 8–0 Manas
- Biggest away win: Neftchi 0–6 Dordoi Bishkek
- Highest scoring: Dordoi Bishkek 8–0 Manas; Aldiyer Kurshab 2–6 Alga Bishkek

The 2014 Kyrgyzstan League was the 23rd season of Kyrgyzstan League, the Football Federation of Kyrgyz Republic's top division of association football. Alay Osh are the defending champions, having won the previous season. The season will start on 21 March 2014, with the first round finishing on 15 July 2014. The Championship & Relegation rounds of the league are due to start again on 4 October 2014.

== Teams ==
Locations of teams in the 2013 Kyrgyzstan League

=== Stadia and locations ===
Note: Table lists in alphabetical order.

Team	Location	Venue	Capacity	Manager	Captain	Best scorer
Abdish-Ata Kant	Kant	Stadion Sportkompleks Abdysh-Ata	3,000	(Kyrgyzstan) Mirlan Eshenov	(Kyrgyzstan) Cholponbek Esenkul Uulu	Cholponbek Esenkul Uulu(9)
Ala Too Naryn	Naryn	Naryn Center	850	(Kyrgyzstan) Anarbek Ormombekov	(Kyrgyzstan) Kairat Kolbaev	(Kyrgyzstan) Bokoleev(5)
Alay Osh	Osh	Suyumbayev Stadion	11,200	(Turkey) Metin Aydin	(Kyrgyzstan) Almazbek Mirzaliev	Almazbek Mirzaliev(10)
Aldiyer Kurshab	Kurshab	Kurshab Stadium	300	(Kyrgyzstan)	(Kyrgyzstan)	(Kyrgyzstan) Abror Kadyraliev(7)
Alga Bishkek	Bishkek	Dynamo Stadion	10,000	(Kyrgyzstan)	(Kyrgyzstan) Ruslan Jamshidov	(Kyrgyzstan) Ivan Filatov, Ruslan Jamshidov(9)
Dordoi Bishkek	Bishkek	Spartak Stadium	23,000	(Serbia) Zavisa Milosavljevic	(Kyrgyzstan) Talant Samsaliev	(Pakistan) Kaleemullah(18)
Manas	Bishkek	Futboln'yi Centr FFKR	1,000	(Kyrgyzstan)	(Kyrgyzstan)	(Kyrgyzstan) (3)
Neftchi	Kochkor-Ata	Stadion Neftyannik Kochkor-Ata	5,000	(Kyrgyzstan)	(Kyrgyzstan)	(Kyrgyzstan) (3)

== First round ==
Pos	Team	Pld	W	D	L	GF	GA	GD	Pts	Qualification
1	Dordoi	14	12	1	1	57	5	+52	37	Qualification for championship group
2	Abdish-Ata	14	10	3	1	44	11	+33	33	Qualification for championship group
3	Alay Osh	14	9	1	4	39	14	+25	28	Qualification for championship group
4	Alga	14	8	3	3	26	11	+15	27	Qualification for championship group
5	Aldiyer	14	5	2	7	18	45	−27	17	Qualification for relegation group
6	Ala Too	14	3	1	10	15	31	−16	10	Qualification for relegation group
7	Neftchi	14	3	1	10	6	34	−28	10	Qualification for relegation group
8	Manas	14	0	0	14	6	60	−54	0	Qualification for relegation group

Updated to match(es) played on 9 July 2014. Source: http://sport.akipress.org/news:93044/
Rules for classification: 1) points; 2) goal difference; 3) number of goals scored.

=== Results ===
Home \ Away	AAK	ATN	AOS	ALK	ABI	DBI	MNS	NKA
Abdish-Ata		2–1	3–1	6–0	1–1	1–1	6–1	3–0
Ala Too	1–3		0–2	2–2	0–1	0–4	4–2	4–1
Alay Osh	1–3	4–0		7–0	4–0	1–3	6–0	2–1
Aldiyer	0–4	1–0	2–2		2–6	0–7	5–0	1–0
Alga	0–0	1–0	1–0	6–0		0–1	5–0	1–0
Dordoi	3–1	6–0	1–2	4–0	2–0		8–0	6–0
Manas	1–6	2–4	0–5	1–2	0–3	0–5		0–1
Neftchi	0–5	1–0	0–2	0–3	1–1	0–6	1–0	

Updated to match(es) played on 15 July 2014. Source:
Legend: Blue = home team win; Yellow = draw; Red = away team win.

== Second stage ==
=== Championship group ===
==== Table ====
Pos	Team	Pld	W	D	L	GF	GA	GD	Pts	Qualification
1	Dordoi (C)	20	15	3	2	67	8	+59	11	2015 AFC Cup Qualifying play-off
2	Abdish-Ata	20	13	4	3	49	17	+32	10	
3	Alga	20	10	5	5	35	22	+13	8	
4	Alay Osh	20	10	2	8	44	23	+21	3	

Updated to match(es) played on 5 November 2014. Source: http://sport.akipress.org/news:93044/
Rules for classification: 1) points; 2) goal difference; 3) number of goals scored.
(C) Champions

==== Results ====
Home \ Away	AAK	AOS	ABI	DBI
Abdish-Ata		2–0	0–2	1–0
Alay Osh	0–1		1–1	0–1
Alga	4–1	1–3		0–5
Dordoi	0–0	3–1	1–1	

Updated to match(es) played on 5 November 2014. Source:
Legend: Blue = home team win; Yellow = draw; Red = away team win.

=== Relegation group ===
==== Table ====
Pos	Team	Pld	W	D	L	GF	GA	GD	Pts
5	Ala Too	20	7	2	11	29	34	−5	13
6	Neftchi	20	6	2	12	11	39	−28	10
7	Aldiyer	20	7	3	10	26	56	−30	7
8	Manas	20	0	3	17	10	71	−61	−7

Updated to match(es) played on 6 November 2014. Source: http://sport.akipress.org/news:93044/
Rules for classification: 1) points; 2) goal difference; 3) number of goals scored.

==== Results ====
Home \ Away	ATN	ALK	MNS	NKA
Ala Too		4–1	5–0	2–0
Aldiyer	0–2		2–1	3–2
Manas	1–1	2–2		0–0
Neftchi	1–0	1–0	1–0	

Updated to match(es) played on 6 November 2014. Source:
Legend: Blue = home team win; Yellow = draw; Red = away team win.

== Season statistics ==
=== Top scorers ===
As of Match played 5 November 2014

Rank	Player	Club	Goals
1	(Pakistan) Kaleemullah	Dordoi	18
2	(Kyrgyzstan) Almazbek Mirzaliev	Alay	12
3	(Kyrgyzstan) Vladimir Verevkin	Alay	10
3	(Kyrgyzstan) Ivan Filatov	Alga	10
5	(Kyrgyzstan) Cholponbek Esenkul Uulu	Abdish-Ata	9

=== Hat-tricks ===
Player	For	Against	Result	Date
(Kyrgyzstan) Elkhan Temirbaev	Dordoi	Manas	8–0	1 June 2014
(Kyrgyzstan) Vladimir Verevkin	Alay Osh	Aldiyer	7–0	14 June 2014
(Pakistan) Kaleemullah^{4}	Dordoi	Neftchi	6–0	25 June 2014
(Kyrgyzstan) Ivan Filatov^{4}	Alga	Aldiyer	6–2	8 July 2014

- ^{4} Player scored 4 goals
