= Issa Modibo Sidibé =

Nigerien footballer (born 1992)

Issa Sidibé
Personal information
- Full name: Issa Modibo Sidibé
- Date of birth: 3 June 1992 (age 34)
- Place of birth: Arlit, Niger
- Height: 1.75 m (5 ft 9 in)
- Position: Forward

Senior career*
Years	Team	Apps	(Gls)
2010–2011	Akokana	0	(0)
2011–2012	Jomo Cosmos	0	(0)
2012–2013	Akokana	0	(0)
2013–2014	Dnepr Mogilev	3	(0)
2014	Oran	0	(0)
2015	Hafia		
2016–2017	Alay Osh		(13)
2017	Kawkab Marrakech	11	(0)
2018	Mouloudia Oujda		
2018–2019	Mulhouse	14	(14)
2019–2020	Zemplín Michalovce	23	(8)
2020–2021	Komárno	15	(1)

International career^{‡}
2011–2019	Niger	27	(4)
- * Club domestic league appearances and goals as of 31 May 2021 ‡ National team caps and goals as of 16 November 2019

Issa Modibo Sidibé (born 3 June 1992) is a Nigerien former professional footballer.

== Career ==
=== Jomo Cosmos ===
In July 2011, Sidibé signed a three-year contract with South African side Jomo Cosmos.

=== ASM Oran ===
In July 2014, Sidibé joined Algerian Ligue Professionnelle 1 side Oran.

=== Alay Osh ===
Prior to the 2016 Kyrgyzstan League season, Sidibé signed for 2015 league champions Alay Osh.

=== Kawkab Marrakech ===
In July 2017, Sidibé signed a two-year contract with Moroccan Botola side Kawkab Marrakech following a two-week trial.

== Career statistics ==
=== International ===
Niger national team
Year	Apps	Goals
2010	1	0
2011	1	1
2012	5	1
2013	4	0
2014	0	0
2015	6	1
2016	0	0
2017	1	1
Total	18	4

Statistics accurate as of match played 5 September 2017

=== International goals ===
As of match played 27 March 2011

#	Date	Venue	Opponent	Score	Result	Competition
1.	27 March 2011	Stade Général Seyni Kountché, Niamey, Niger	Sierra Leone	2–1	3–1	2012 Africa Cup of Nations qualification
2.	14 November 2012	Stade Général Seyni Kountché, Niamey, Niger	Senegal	1–0	1–1	Friendly
3.	6 June 2015	Stade Général Seyni Kountché, Niamey, Niger	Gabon	2–0	2–1	Friendly
4.	5 September 2017	Stade Adrar, Agadir, Morocco	Mauritania	1–0	2–0	Friendly
