= David Tetteh =

Footballer (born 1985)

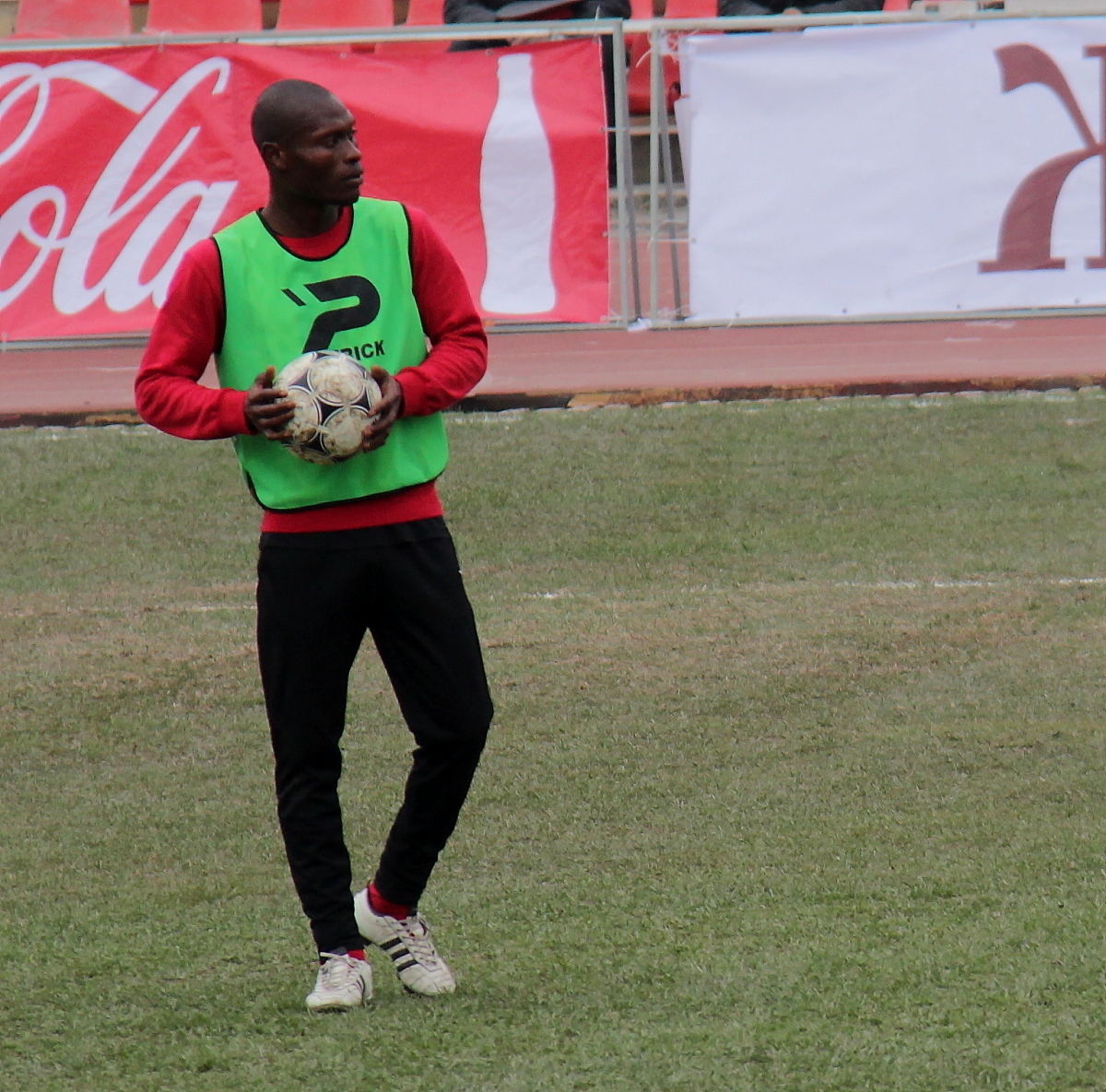
- Tetteh trains before the 2014 AFC Challenge Cup qualification match against Tajikistan

Personal information
- Full name: David Bruce Tetteh
- Date of birth: 10 August 1985 (age 41)
- Place of birth: Ghana
- Height: 1.80 m (5 ft 11 in)
- Position: Midfielder

Senior career*
Years	Team	Apps	(Gls)
2006–2008	Regar-TadAZ	15	(0)
2007	→ Dordoi Bishkek (loan)	25	(8)
2008–2016	Dordoi Bishkek	72	(7)
2016–2017	Al-Ittihad		
2017	Tatvan Gençlerbirliği	7	(1)
2018	Benfica de Macau	12	(2)
2018–2019	Sheikh Jamal Dhanmondi	21	(1)

International career
2013–2015	Kyrgyzstan	15	(3)
- * Club domestic league appearances and goals

David Bruce Tetteh (born 10 August 1985) is a football coach and former player who is a coach for Dordoi Bishkek. Born in Ghana, he represented the Kyrgyzstan national team at international level.

== Club career ==
Born in Ghana, he moved to Central Asia in 2006, playing one season in Tajikistan for Regar-TadAZ Tursunzoda. He moved to neighbouring Kyrgyzstan in 2007, on loan to local giants Dordoi, for whom he signed the following season. In 2008 Tetteh obtained Kyrgyz citizenship, which made him available for the national team five years later. By the end of the 2013 season, Tetteh reached the milestone of scoring at least 100 goals in Kyrgyzstan League and Cup matches.

After nine years with Dordoi Bishkek, Tetteh moved to Bahraini Second Division side Al-Ittihad on 30 September 2016. In September 2017, Tetteh joined Turkish Regional Amateur League side Tatvan Gençlerbirliği.

In October 2018, Tetteh joined Sheikh Jamal Dhanmondi.

== International career ==
Tetteh came to fame in Kyrgyzstan immediately after he made his international debut at the 2014 AFC Challenge Cup qualification tournament. He scored all of Kyrgyzstan's goals in three consecutive 1–0 victories.

Kyrgyzstan manager Sergey Dvoryankov praised Tetteh, and after one of the matches of the campaign thanked "everyone who gave him Kyrgyz citizenship".

== Coaching career ==
On 3 April 2021, Dordoi Bishkek announced the return of Tetteh as a coach for their second team.

On 8 January 2022, Tetteh was promoted to coach of Dordoi Bishkek.

== Career statistics ==
=== Club ===
As of match played 1 August 2019

Appearances and goals by club, season and competition
Club	Season	League			National cup		Continental		Other		Total	
Club	Season	Division	Apps	Goals	Apps	Goals	Apps	Goals	Apps	Goals	Apps	Goals
Dordoi Bishkek (loan)	2007	Kyrgyzstan League		8			5	1	–		5	1
Dordoi Bishkek	2008	Kyrgyzstan League		13			2	3	–		2	3
Dordoi Bishkek	2009	Kyrgyzstan League		5			3	4	–		3	4
Dordoi Bishkek	2010	Kyrgyzstan League		11			5	3	–		5	1
Dordoi Bishkek	2011	Kyrgyzstan League		9			–		–			
Dordoi Bishkek	2012	Kyrgyzstan League		6			5	2	–		5	2
Dordoi Bishkek	2013	Kyrgyzstan League		12			5	1	–		5	1
Dordoi Bishkek	2014	Kyrgyzstan League		5			–		–			
Dordoi Bishkek	2015	Kyrgyzstan League		5			1	0	–		1	0
Dordoi Bishkek	2016	Kyrgyzstan League		6			2	1	–		2	1
Dordoi Bishkek	Total			72			28	15	0	0	28+	87
Tatvan Gençlerbirliği	2017–18	Turkish Regional Amateur League	7	1	0	0	–		–		7	1
Benfica de Macau	2018	Liga de Elite	12	2	0	0	6	1	–		18	3
Sheikh Jamal Dhanmondi Club	2019	Bangladesh Premier League	21	1	0	0	–		–		21	1
Career total			40+	84			34	16	0	0	74+	100+

=== International ===
Appearances and goals by national team and year
National team	Year	Apps	Goals
Kyrgyzstan	2013	8	3
Kyrgyzstan	2014	6	0
Kyrgyzstan	2015	1	0
Kyrgyzstan	Total	15	3

Scores and results list Kyrgyzstan's goal tally first, score column indicates score after each Tetteh goal.

List of international goals scored by David Tetteh
No.	Date	Venue	Opponent	Score	Result	Competition
1	17 March 2013	Spartak Stadium, Bishkek, Kyrgyzstan	Macau	1–0	1–0	2014 AFC Challenge Cup qualification
2	19 March 2013	Spartak Stadium, Bishkek, Kyrgyzstan	Pakistan	1–0	1–0	2014 AFC Challenge Cup qualification
3	21 March 2013	Spartak Stadium, Bishkek, Kyrgyzstan	Tajikistan	1–0	1–0	2014 AFC Challenge Cup qualification

== Honors ==
Regar-TadAZ

- Tajik League: 2006
- Tajik Cup: 2006

Dordoi Bishkek

- Kyrgyzstan League: 2007, 2008, 2009, 2011, 2012, 2014
- Kyrgyzstan Cup: 2008, 2010, 2012, 2014
- Kyrgyzstan Super Cup: 2011, 2012, 2013, 2014
