= Alia Sylla =

Guinean footballer

Personal information
- Full name: Alia Sylla
- Date of birth: 4 September 1988 (age 38)
- Place of birth: Conakry, Guinea
- Height: 1.84 m (6 ft 1/2 in)
- Position: Forward

Senior career*
Years	Team	Apps	(Gls)
–2009	FC Sumbay		
2009–2010	Chayka Yubileyny		
2011	Vesta Korolev		
2012	Regar-TadAZ		
2013	Energetik Dushanbe		
2014	CSKA Pamir Dushanbe		(6)
2015–2018	Alay Osh		(55)
2018	Monastir	7	(0)
- * Club domestic league appearances and goals as of 20:10, 11 March 2021 (UTC)

Alia Sylla (born 4 September 1988) is a Guinean footballer who is last known to have played as a midfielder or striker for Monastir.

== Early life ==
Sylla was born in Conakry, Guinea before moving to Marseille in France and then returning to Guinea to play for second-tier side FC Sumbay.

== Club career ==
After going on trial with Lokomotiv, Sylla signed for Chayka Yubileyny in the Russian fourth division.

Before the 2013 season, he signed for Energetik Dushanbe.

During the 2014 season, Sylla played for CSKA Pamir Dushanbe, scoring 6 goals.

=== Aly Osh ===
Prior to the 2015 season, Sylla signed for Kyrgyzstani club Alay Osh from Tajik club CSKA Pamir, winning the Kyrgyz Premier League for the first time as well as finishing the season as the leagues top goal scorer, with 17 goals. The following season, Sylla again won the Kyrgyz Premier League, finished the season as the leagues top goal scorer with 21 goals, and won the June player of the month. At the end of the 2017 season, Sylla won the Kyrgyz Premier League and finished as the leagues top goal scorer, for a third year in a row, scoring 12 goals. Sylla left Alay Osh in July 2018 having scored 5 goals in 5 games during the 2018 season, after his contract expired.

In May 2018, Sylla was handed a 10 match ban by the Kyrgyz Football Union after being involved in a mass brawl on 20 May 2018 at the end of the match between Aly and Alga Bishkek.

Sylla left Alay in July 2018 after his contract with the club expired.

=== Monastir ===
After leaving Aly, Sylla signed a two-year contract with Tunisian club Monastir in October 2018.

== Honours ==
Regar-TadAZ Tursunzoda

- Tajikistan Cup: 2012

Alay Osh

- Kyrgyz Premier League: 2015, 2016, 2017

Individual

- Kyrgyz Premier League top-goalscorer: 2015, 2016, 2017
