= Murolimzhon Akhmedov =

Kyrgyzstani footballer (born 1992)

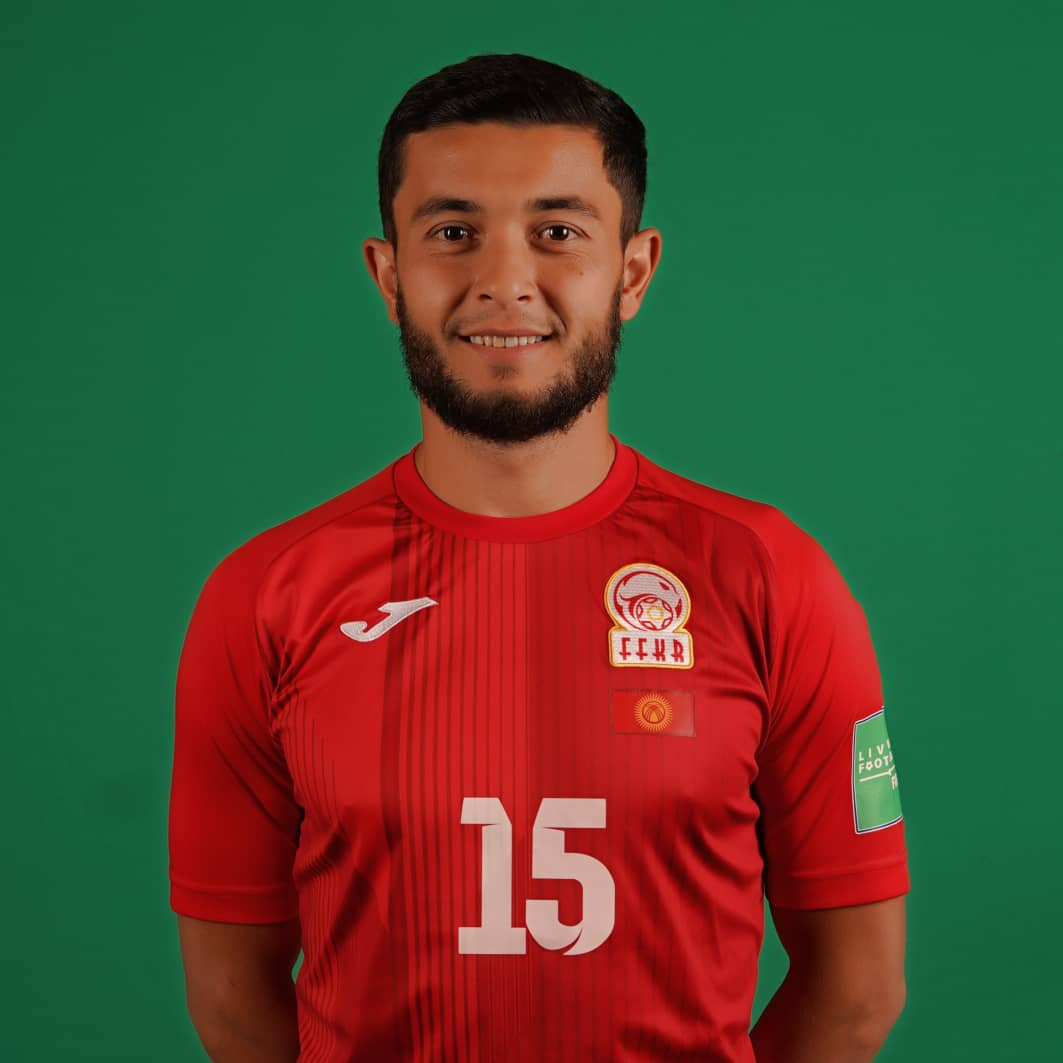

Personal information
- Full name: Murolimzhon Murodilzhonovich Akhmedov
- Date of birth: 5 January 1992 (age 34)
- Place of birth: Uch-Korgon, Kyrgyzstan
- Position: Midfielder

Team information
- Current team: Neftchi Kochkor-Ata
- Number: 8

Senior career*
Years	Team	Apps	(Gls)
2014–2017	Alay Osh		
2018–2019	Dordoi Bishkek	28	(13)
2019–2020	Saif	6	(0)
2020	Neftchi Kochkor-Ata	12	(2)
2021	Bangladesh Police	26	(2)
2022	Nur-Batken	26	(5)
2023–2024	Dordoi Bishkek	46	(11)
2025–	Neftchi Kochkor-Ata		

International career
2017–	Kyrgyzstan	14	(0)
- * Club domestic league appearances and goals as of 30 January 2024 @ 18:46(AEST)

Murolimzhon Murodilzhonovich Akhmedov (Kyrgyz: Муролимжон Ахмедов; Russian: Муролимжон Муродилжонович Ахмедов; born 5 January 1992) is a Kyrgyzstani professional footballer who plays as a midfielder for Neftchi Kochkor-Ata and the Kyrgyzstan national team.

== Career ==
Akhmedov was born in Uch-Korgon, Batken Province, Kyrgyzstan.

On 5 February 2019, Dordoi Bishkek announced that Akhmedov had signed a new one-year contract with the club, after scoring 13 goals in 28 Kyrgyzstan League matches during 2018.

On 24 November 2019, Dordoi Bishkek announced the departure of Akhmedov.

== Career statistics ==
Kyrgyzstan national team
Year	Apps	Goals
2017	2	0
Total	2	0

Statistics accurate as of match played 14 November 2017

== Honours ==
Alay Osh

- Kyrgyzstan League: 2015, 2016, 2017
