= 2014 Kyrgyzstan Super Cup =

Kirgiz Football Competition

The 2014 Kyrgyzstan Football Super Cup (Kyrgyz: Кыргызстандын футбол Суперкубогу) was the 5th Kyrgyzstan Super Cup match, a football match which was contested between the 2013 Top League and 2013 Kyrgyzstan Cup champion, Alay, and the finalist Top League Dordoi.

== Match details ==
2014 Kyrgyzstan Super Cup
24 March 2014
18:00
Final

Dordoi	3–0	Alay
Milovanović 29' (pen.), 86'; Baymatov 79'		S.Rakhmonov (yellow card) 25' (yellow-red card) 70'

SC Dordoi, Bishkek
Attendance: 850

Dordoi	Alay
