= Abror Kydyraliyev =

Kyrgyzstani footballer

Personal information
- Full name: Abrorbek Anvarovich Kydyraliev
- Date of birth: 5 April 1992 (age 34)
- Place of birth: Kyrgyzstan
- Position: Midfielder

Team information
- Current team: Kaganat

Senior career*
Years	Team	Apps	(Gls)
2008–2010	Aldiyer Kurshab		
2011–2013	Alay OSh		(2)
2014	Aldiyer Kurshab		(9)
2015–2017	Alay OSh		(5)
2018–2020	Neftchi Kochkor-Ata		
2021–	Kaganat		

International career
2014–	Kyrgyzstan	3	(0)
- * Club domestic league appearances and goals as of 22:50, 24 March 2021 (UTC)

Abrorbek Anvarovich Kydyraliev (born 5 April 1992) is an association football midfielder, who plays for FC Kaganat in the Kyrgyzstan League and for the Kyrgyzstan national football team.

== International career ==
Kydyraliyev made his international debut on 13 April 2014 in a 0–0 draw against Afghanistan. He played in his second game, on 14 May 2014, also against Afghanistan. He appeared in his first win for the team on 23 May 2014 in a 1–0 win over Myanmar in the 2015 AFC Asian Cup qualifying, at the Addu Football Stadium in The Maldives.
