= 2013 Kyrgyzstan League =

Kyrgyzstan League
- Season: 2013
- Champions: Alay Osh; 1st Premier League title 3rd Kyrgyzian title
- Relegated: FC-95 Bishkek
- 2014 AFC Cup: Alay Osh
- Matches: 80
- Goals: 266 (3.33 per match)
- Top goalscorer: Almazbek Mirzaliev (20)
- Biggest home win: Abdish-Ata Kant 14–0 FC-96
- Biggest away win: FC-96 0–12 Abdish-Ata Kant
- Highest scoring: Abdish-Ata Kant 14–0 FC-96
- Highest attendance: Neftchi 1–2 Alay (3200)

The 2013 Kyrgyzstan League was the 22nd season of Kyrgyzstan League, the Football Federation of Kyrgyz Republic's top division of association football. Dordoi Bishkek are the defending champions, having won the previous season. Due to sponsorship reasons the league was known as the Shoro Top League.

== Teams ==
Locations of teams in the 2013 Kyrgyzstan League

=== Stadia and locations ===
Note: Table lists in alphabetical order.

Team	Location	Venue	Capacity
Abdish-Ata Kant	Kant	Stadion Sportkompleks Abdysh-Ata	3,000
Ala Too Naryn	Naryn		
Alay Osh	Osh	Suyumbayev Stadion	12,000
Alga Bishkek	Bishkek	Dynamo Stadion	10,000
Dordoi Bishkek	Bishkek	Spartak Stadium	23,000
FC-95 Bishkek (Isik-Kol)	Bishkek		3,000
FC-96 Bishkek (Manas Talas)	Bishkek	Futboln'yi Centr FFKR	1,000
Neftchi Kochkor-Ata	Kochkor-Ata	Stadion Neftyannik Kochkor-Ata	5,000

== First round ==
=== League table ===
Pos	Team	Pld	W	D	L	GF	GA	GD	Pts	Qualification or relegation
1	Alay Osh	14	10	3	1	32	11	+21	33	Qualification for championship group
2	Dordoi Bishkek	14	9	3	2	42	11	+31	30	Qualification for championship group
3	Abdish-Ata Kant	14	8	3	3	45	14	+31	27	Qualification for championship group
4	Alga Bishkek	14	7	4	3	33	8	+25	25	Qualification for championship group
5	Ala Too Naryn	14	6	3	5	28	19	+9	21	Qualification for relegation group
6	Neftchi Kochkor-Ata	14	5	2	7	19	20	−1	17	Qualification for relegation group
7	FC-95 Bishkek	14	1	0	13	10	38	−28	3	Qualification for relegation group
8	FC-96 Bishkek	14	1	0	13	5	93	−88	3	Qualification for relegation group

Updated to match(es) played on 18 October 2013. Source: https://www.fifa.com/associations/association=kgz/nationalleague/standings.html
Rules for classification: 1) points; 2) goal difference; 3) number of goals scored.

==== Results ====
Home \ Away	AAK	ATN	AOS	ABI	DBI	F95	F96	NKA
Abdish-Ata Kant		3–0	2–2	1–0	3–1	1–0	14–0	1–1
Ala Too Naryn	2–3		1–2	1–1	1–1	2–1	9–0	2–0
Alay Osh	2–1	1–1		1–0	2–1	5–1	4–1	4–0
Alga Bishkek	3–1	1–0	0–0		1–1	3–0	7–0	0–1
Dordoi Bishkek	3–0	4–0	2–0	1–1		4–0	7–0	3–1
FC-95 Bishkek	0–3	1–2	0–3	0–4	1–2		2–1	2–3
FC-96 Bishkek	0–12	0–5	0–4	0–10	1–11	2–1		0–3
Neftchi Kochkor-Ata	0–0	1–2	1–2	1–2	0–1	3–1	4–0	

Updated to match(es) played on 22 October 2013. Source: Soccerway
Legend: Blue = home team win; Yellow = draw; Red = away team win.

== Second round ==
=== Championship group ===
==== Table ====
Pos	Team	Pld	W	D	L	GF	GA	GD	Pts	Qualification or relegation
1	Alay Osh (C)	20	13	4	3	38	19	+19	43	AFC Cup
2	Dordoi Bishkek	20	12	4	4	53	16	+37	40	
3	Abdish-Ata Kant	20	9	6	5	50	20	+30	33	
4	Alga Bishkek	20	8	7	5	36	14	+22	31	

Updated to match(es) played on 18 November 2013. Source: Soccerway.com
Rules for classification: 1) points; 2) goal difference; 3) number of goals scored.
(C) Champions

==== Results ====
Home \ Away	AOS	DBI	AAK	ABI
Alay Osh		1–0	1–0	0–0
Dordoi Bishkek	4–0		3–2	0–1
Abdish-Ata Kant	2–1	1–1		0–0
Alga Bishkek	2–1	0–3	0–0	

Updated to match(es) played on 18 November 2013. Source: Soccerway
Legend: Blue = home team win; Yellow = draw; Red = away team win.

=== Relegation group ===
==== Table ====
Pos	Team	Pld	W	D	L	GF	GA	GD	Pts	Qualification or relegation
5	Ala Too Naryn	20	11	3	6	41	23	+18	36	
6	Neftchi Kochkor-Ata	20	9	3	8	29	24	+5	30	
7	FC-95 Bishkek	20	3	1	16	14	45	−31	10	
8	FC-96 Bishkek	20	1	0	19	7	107	−100	3	Relegation to 2014 Kyrgyzstan League Second Level

Updated to match(es) played on 23 October 2013. Source: Soccerway.com
Rules for classification: 1) points; 2) goal difference; 3) number of goals scored.

==== Results ====
Home \ Away	ATN	NKA	F96	F95
Ala Too Naryn		0–1	4–0	2–1
Neftchi Kochkor-Ata	1–2		2–1	1–0
FC-96 Bishkek	0–1	1–5		0–1
FC-95 Bishkek	1–4	0–0	1–0	

Updated to match(es) played on 23 October 2013. Source: Soccerway
Legend: Blue = home team win; Yellow = draw; Red = away team win.

== Top goal-scorers ==
The top scorers are:

Rank	Scorer	Club	Goals (Pen.)
1	(Kyrgyzstan) Almaz Mirzaliyev	Abdish-Ata Kant	20 (0)
2	(Kyrgyzstan) Mirlan Murzaev	Dordoi Bishkek	13 (1)
3	(Ghana) David Tetteh	Dordoi Bishkek	11
