= Almazbek Mirzaliev =

Kyrgyzstani footballer

Almazbek Mirzaliyev
Personal information
- Full name: Almazbek Mirzaliyev
- Date of birth: 10 June 1987 (age 39)
- Place of birth: Osh, Kirghizia, Soviet Union
- Height: 1.83 m (6 ft 0 in)
- Position: Forward

Senior career*
Years	Team	Apps	(Gls)
2003–2007	Alay	87	(26)
2007–2014	Abdish-Ata	139	(90)
2012	→Udon Thani F.C.(loan)		
2014–2015	Alay	20	(12)
2015–2016	Dordoi	10	(9)

International career^{‡}
2007–	Kyrgyzstan	16	(1)
- * Club domestic league appearances and goals as of 03:59, 8 Jule 2015 (UTC) ‡ National team caps and goals as of 03:59, 8 Julee 2015 (UTC)

Almazbek Mirzaliyev (Kyrgyz: Алмазбек Мирзалиев; Russian: Алмазбек Мирзалиев) is a professional Kyrgyzstani footballer whose last known club was Dordoi Biškek in the top division of the Kyrgyzstan League.

He is also a Kyrgyzstan national football team player.

== Career ==
=== Alay osh ===
Almazbek Mirzaliyev began his career at the club with Alay Osh, in which he played two seasons, scoring 87 match 36 was the best scorer of the club.

=== Udon Thani F.C. ===
Season 2012 held in Thai Udon Thani F.C., with him in the Udon Thani F.C. played his teammate Ildar Amirov.

=== Abdish-Ata Kant ===
In the season of 2013 he returned to Abdish-Ata, and again became the top scorer in the Top league 19 matches, scoring 20 goals. By the end of the 2013 season, Mirzaliev reached the milestone of scoring at least 100 goals in Kyrgyzstan League and Cup matches.

In 2014, on loan transferred to his first club in 2014 Alay. Sezon began to draw the group stage of the AFC Cup, its first participation in the tournament Mrzalieva. Mirzaliyev contributed greatly to vyigrash his team in the playoffs match of the AFC Cup 2014, but in the group stage of his club could not get out of the group after losing in five games, bringing one match in a draw.

== Career statistics ==
Club

Club	Season	League			National Cup		Continental		Other		Total	
Club	Season	Division	Apps	Goals	Apps	Goals	Apps	Goals	Apps	Goals	Apps	Goals
Alay	2003	Top League	7	2	1	0	0	0	1	3	9	5
Alay	2004	Top League	33	10	4	1	0	0	0	0	37	11
Alay	2005	Top League	10	2	0	0	0	0	0	0	10	2
Alay	2006	Top League	19	11	3	1	0	0	0	0	22	12
Alay	Total		72	25	7	2	0	0	1	3	90	28
Abdish-Ata	2007	Kyrgyzstan League	28	21	5	4	0	0	0	0	33	25
Abdish-Ata	2008	Kyrgyzstan League	14	7	1	0	0	0	0	0	15	7
Abdish-Ata	2009	Kyrgyzstan League	19	9	3	1	0	0	0	0	22	10
Abdish-Ata	2010	Kyrgyzstan League	18	6	4	2	0	0	0	0	22	6
Abdish-Ata	2011	Kyrgyzstan League	18	7	1	0	0	0	0	0	19	7
Abdish-Ata	2012	Kyrgyzstan League	5	2	0	0	0	0	0	0	5	2
Abdish-Ata	Total		102	52	14	7	0	0	0	0	116	59
Udon Thani (loan)	2012	Regional League	10	0	0	0	0	0	0	0	10	0
Udon Thani (loan)	Total		1	0	0	0	0	0	0	0	10	0
Abdish-Ata	2013	Kyrgyzstan League	17	20	4	2	0	0	1	0	22	22
Abdish-Ata	Total		17	20	4	2	0	0	1	0	22	22
Alay	2014	Top League	20	12	3	1	7	0	1	0	31	13
Alay	Total		20	12	3	1	7	0	1	0	31	13
Dordoi	2015	Top League	10	9	1	1	1	0	5	3	17	13
Dordoi	Total		10	9	1	1	1	0	5	3	17	13
Career total			231	118	29	13	8	0	6	6	274	137

=== International goals ===
Scores and results list Kyrgyzstan's goal tally first.

#	Date	Venue	Opponent	Score	Result	Competition
1.	16 June 2015	Spartak Stadium, Bishkek, Kyrgyzstan	Australia	1–2	1–2	2018 FIFA World Cup qualification
Correct as of 7 Jule 2015

== Honours ==
Abdish-Ata Kant

- Kyrgyzstan Cup: 2007, 2009, 2011
- Ala-Too Cup: 2015

Individual

- Top scorer of the Top League: 2007 (21 goals), 2013 (20 goals)
