= Previato =

Previato is an Italian surname. Notable people with the surname include:

- Emma Previato (1952–2022), Italian–born American mathematician
- Giancarlo Previato (born 1993), Brazilian soccer player
- Lúcia Mendonça Previato (born 1949), Brazilian biologist
