= 2015 Kyrgyzstan League =

Kyrgyzstan League
- Season: 2015
- Champions: Alay Osh
- AFC Cup: Alay Osh; Dordoi
- Matches: 60
- Goals: 196 (3.27 per match)
- Top goalscorer: Alia Sylla (17)
- Biggest home win: Dordoi 7–1 Ala-Too
- Biggest away win: KG United 0–6 Alga Bishkek
- Highest scoring: Alay 7–2 KG United

The 2015 Kyrgyzstan League was the 24th season of Kyrgyzstan League, the Football Federation of Kyrgyz Republic's top division of association football. Dordoi are the defending champions, having won the previous season.

== Teams ==
Locations of teams in the 2015 Kyrgyzstan League

Note: Table lists in alphabetical order.

Team	Location	Venue	Capacity	Manager	Captain
Abdish-Ata Kant	Kant	Stadion Sportkompleks Abdysh-Ata	3,000	(Kyrgyzstan) Mirlan Eshenov	(Kyrgyzstan) Rustem Usanov
Ala Too Naryn	Naryn	Naryn Center	850	(Kyrgyzstan) Anarbek Ormombekov	(Kyrgyzstan) Ruslan Sydykov
Alay Osh	Osh	Suyumbayev Stadion	11,200	(Russia) Nikolay Vlasiçev	(Kyrgyzstan) Anatoliy Vlasichev
Alga Bishkek	Bishkek	Spartak Stadium	23,000	(Kyrgyzstan) Nurzat Kadyrkulov	(Kyrgyzstan) Ruslan Djamshidov
Dordoi Bishkek	Bishkek	Spartak Stadium	23,000	(Serbia) Zavisa Milosavljevic	(Kyrgyzstan) Talant Samsaliev
KG United Bishkek	Bishkek	Football Centre FFKR	1,000	(Iran) Muhammad Ali Reza	(Kyrgyzstan) Nurkal Sataev

== Foreign players ==
Club	Visa 1	Visa 2	Visa 3	Visa 4	Visa 5
Dordoi Bishkek	(Russia) Aziz Keldiyarov	(Pakistan) Muhammad Adil	(Pakistan) Hassan Bashir		
KG United Bishkek					
Alay Osh	(Kazakhstan) Kenesbay Shubaev	(Guinea) Alia Sylla			
Alga Bishkek	(Russia) Sergei Kaleutin	(Kazakhstan) Ivan Sivozhelezov	(Uzbekistan) Artur Shapran		
Abdish-Ata Kant	(Nigeria) Oluwatosin Aleriva	(Iran) Seifakhreddin Hayatcher			
Ala-Too Naryn					

== League table ==
Pos	Team	Pld	W	D	L	GF	GA	GD	Pts	Qualification or relegation
1	Alay Osh (C)	20	16	2	2	48	18	+30	50	2016 AFC Cup
2	Dordoi Bishkek	20	13	3	4	60	22	+38	42	2016 AFC Cup
3	Abdish-Ata Kant	20	9	5	6	24	14	+10	32	
4	Alga Bishkek	20	8	6	6	32	18	+14	30	
5	Ala-Too	20	4	1	15	17	42	−25	13	
6	KG United	20	1	1	18	15	82	−67	4	

Updated to match(es) played on 3 November 2015. Source: Football League of Kyrgyzstan
Rules for classification: 1) points; 2) goal difference; 3) number of goals scored.
(C) Champions

== Results ==
=== First round ===
Home \ Away	AAK	ATN	AOS	ABI	DBI	KGU
Abdish-Ata		1–0	0–1	1–0	2–2	0–1
Ala Too	0–1		1–3	0–1	0–1	3–1
Alay Osh	2–1	2–0		3–0	2–1	7–2
Alga	0–0	0–0	0–0		0–4	5–1
Dordoi	0–2	5–1	1–0	1–1		6–1
KG United	0–0	0–1	1–4	0–6	1–6	

Updated to match(es) played on 25 October 2015. Source:
Legend: Blue = home team win; Yellow = draw; Red = away team win.

=== Second round ===
Home \ Away	AAK	ATN	AOS	ABI	DBI	KGU
Abdish-Ata		1–0	0–2	2–2	1–3	3–0
Ala Too	0–3		0–4	1–3	0–2	5–1
Alay Osh	1–0	3–2		2–1	3–3	5–0
Alga	0–0	2–0	0–1		0–1	6–0
Dordoi	0–2	7–1	3–0	1–2		5–2
KG United	0–4	1–2	2–3	0–3	1–8	

Updated to match(es) played on 3 November 2015. Source:
Legend: Blue = home team win; Yellow = draw; Red = away team win.

== Top scorers ==
As of Match played 3 November 2015

Rank	Player	Club	Goals
1	(Guinea) Alia Sylla	Alay	17
2	(Kyrgyzstan) Mirlan Murzaev	Dordoi	15
3	(Kyrgyzstan) Almazbek Mirzaliev	Dordoi	13
4	(Kyrgyzstan) Ivan Filatov	Abdysh-Ata/Alga	12
5	(Kyrgyzstan) Maksat Alimov	Alay	7
5	(Kyrgyzstan) Mirbek Akhmataliev	Alga	7
5	(Kyrgyzstan) Aziz Sydykov	Dordoi	7
8	(Kyrgyzstan) David Tetteh	Dordoi	5
8	(Kyrgyzstan) Farhat Musabekov	Abdysh-Ata	5
8	(Kyrgyzstan) Evgeny Malinin	Abdysh-Ata	5

=== Hat-tricks ===
Player	For	Against	Result	Date
(Kyrgyzstan) Mirlan Murzaev	Dordoi	KG United	6–1	10 May 2015
(Kyrgyzstan) Mirlan Murzaev	Dordoi	Ala-Too	7–1	20 May 2015
(Kyrgyzstan) Mirlan Murzaev	Dordoi	KG United	5–2	23 May 2015
(Guinea) Alia Sylla^{4}	Alay Osh	KG United	7–2	27 May 2015
(Kyrgyzstan) Mirbek Akhmataliev	Alga	KG United	5–1	9 June 2015
(Kyrgyzstan) Aziz Sydykov	Dordoi	KG United	8–1	18 October 2015
(Kyrgyzstan) Kairat Zhirgalbek Uulu	Dordoi	KG United	8–1	18 October 2015

- ^{4} Player scored 4 goals
