= 2019 Kyrgyzstan Super Cup =

| Alay | Dordoi |
| 1 | 2 |
- Date: 14 July 2019
- Venue: Suyumbayev Stadion, Osh

The 2019 Kyrgyzstan Football Super Cup (Kyrgyz: Кыргызстандын футбол Суперкубогу) was the 9th Kyrgyzstan Super Cup match, a football match which will contest between the 2019 Top League and 2019 Kyrgyzstan Cup champion, Dordoi, and 2019 Top League and 2019 Kyrgyzstan Cup runners-up Alay.

== Match details ==
14 July 2019
17:00

| Alay | 1–2 | Dordoi |
|---|---|---|
| Akhmataliev 51' | Report | Valikayev 19'; Batyrkanov 75' |

Suyumbayev Stadion, Osh

| Alay | Dordoi |
