= Kyrgyz First League =

First League Улуттук Лига Uluttuk liga
- Founded: 1992
- Country: Kyrgyzstan
- Confederation: AFC
- Number of clubs: 16
- Level on pyramid: 2
- Promotion to: Kyrgyz Higher League
- Relegation to: Kyrgyz Regional League
- Domestic cup: Kyrgyzstan Cup
- Current champions: Yssyk-Kol Muras (2022)
- Broadcaster: Kyrgyz Sport TV
- Website: https://kpfl.kg/ru/tournament/6
- Current: National League 2025

The Kyrgyz First League (previously known as the National League until 2026) is the second highest division of Kyrgyzstan football, below the Kyrgyz Higher League. Since 2023 season the league is composed of 16 teams which are divided into two groups - A and B with 8 teams in each group. Group winners as well as the runners-up enter a play-off tournament to determine the champion, 2nd place and a 3rd place team.

== Champions ==
Year	Winner of Northern zone	Winner of Southern zone	Top goalscorer
1993	Zhashtyk Ysyk-Ata	Zhashtyk Ak Altyn	
1994			
1995	Rotor Bishkek	not played	
1996			
1997	Dinamo Sokuluk		
1998			
1999	Dinamo Talas	results unknown	Mizyur Zholdoshev – Dinamo Talas (24)
2000	Dinamo Alamedin	results unknown	Oleg Gevlenko – Ekolog (29)
2001	RUOR-Guardia Bishkek	Druzhba Aravan	
2002	Abdish-Ata Kant	not played	
2003	Nashe Pivo Bishkek	results unknown	Erkin Imankulov – SPK Kelechek & Ravil Izrailov – Shopokov (14)
2004	Nashe Pivo Kant	Dinamo Batken (B1), Shumkar-M Kara-Suu (B2)	Seytkulov – Dinamo-Chuy UVD Bishkek (34)
2005	Sher Bishkek	Kurbanov-100 Uch-Kurgan	Vladimir Khoroshunov – (Kyrgyzstan) A. Osmonov (31)
2006	Nashe Pivo Kant		(Kyrgyzstan) Artyom Shcherbina – Nashe Pivo (18)
2007	Nashe Pivo Kant	not played	
2008	Kara-Balta	Ak-Bura Osh	
2009	Nashe Pivo Kant		(Kyrgyzstan) Ivan Filatov – Nashe Pivo (15)
2010	Dordoi-2 Bishkek	not played	(Kyrgyzstan) Khurshid Lutfullayev – Nashe Pivo (31)
2011	Dordoi-2 Bishkek	Aldiyer Kurshab	(Kyrgyzstan) Urmat Abdukayimov – Dordoi-2 (25)
2012	Nashe Pivo Kant	Aldiyer Kurshab	(Kyrgyzstan) A. Suleymanov – Aldiyer (14)
2013	Nashe Pivo Kant	Aldiyer Kurshab	(Nigeria) Oluwatosin Aleriwa – Talas (18)
2014	Kara Balta	Kara-Shoro Ozgon	(Kyrgyzstan) Nurlan Ibragimzhan Uulu – Toktogul (14)
2015	Kara Balta	Aldiyer Kurshab	

=== Recent seasons ===
Year	Zone A	Zone B	Play-off Winner	Play-off Runner-Up	Ref.
2022	FC Nashe Kant	FC Metallurg Kadamjay	Issyk-Kul Muras FC	FC Metallurg Kadamjay	
2023	Issyk-Kul Muras FC	Akademia Football Asyl Momunov	Issyk-Kul Muras FC	FC Nashe Kant	
2024	FC Issyk Kul Bosteri	FC Nur-Batken	FC Issyk Kul Bosteri	FC Nur-Batken	
2025	FC Umut	FC Legenda	FC Toktogul	FC Umut	
2026					

== Current members ==
The following 16 clubs will compete in the National League during the 2023 season.

Zone "A"
Club	Location	Stadium
Altay	Naryn	Naryn Central Stadium
Burana-Tokmok	Tokmok	Tokmok Pedagogical-Industrial College Stadium
Dordoi-RUOR	Bishkek	RUOR
Nashe	Kant	Kant Central Stadium
Semetei-Talas	Talas	Eshim Kutmanaliev stadium
Champion	Bishkek	Unknown
Cholpon-Ata	Cholpon-Ata	Cholpon-Ata Central Stadium
Yssyk-Kol Muras	Bosteri	Cholpon-Ata Central Stadium

Zone "B"
Club	Location	Stadium
Anadolu	Bishkek	Unknown
A.Momunov's Football Academy	Osh	Academy stadium
Isfayram	Kara-Döbö, Jalal-Abad	Isfayram stadium
Metallurg	Kadamjay	Kadamjay Central Stadium
Nur-Batken	Batken	Batken Central Stadium
Tepe-Korgon	Tepe-Korgon	Tepe-Korgon Central Stadium
FC Shakhtyor Kyzyl-Kiya	Kyzyl-Kyya	Kulatov Stadium
FC Shakhtyor Tashkömür	Tash-Kömür	Shakhtyor Stadium
