= Cholponbek Esenkul Uulu =

Kyrgyzstani footballer

Personal information
- Date of birth: 15 January 1986 (age 40)
- Place of birth: Soviet Union
- Height: 1.75 m (5 ft 9 in)
- Position: Striker

Youth career
- 2003–2005: Arminia Bielefeld

Senior career*
Years	Team	Apps	(Gls)
2003	Abdish-Ata Kant		
2005–2006	Gütersloh	5	(0)
2006	Kufstein		
2006–2014	Abdish-Ata Kant		
2015	Alga Bishkek		
2015	Nashe Pivo		
2016	Abdish-Ata Kant		

International career^{‡}
2007–2014	Kyrgyzstan	9	(3)
- * Club domestic league appearances and goals as of 7 June 2021 ‡ National team caps and goals as of 7 June 2021

Cholponbek Esenkul Uulu (born 15 January 1986) is a former Kyrgyzstani footballer who played as a striker.

== Career statistics ==
=== International ===
Kyrgyzstan national team
Year	Apps	Goals
2007	2	1
2008	2	0
2009	1	0
2010	0	0
2011	3	2
2012	0	0
2013	0	0
2014	1	0
Total	9	3

Statistics accurate as of match played 5 September 2014

=== International Goals ===
#	Date	Venue	Opponent	Score	Result	Competition
1	18 October 2007	Bishkek, Kyrgyzstan	Jordan	1–0	2–0	2010 FIFA World Cup qualification
2	25 March 2011	Malé, Maldives	Cambodia	3–2	4–3	2012 AFC Challenge Cup qualification(AFC)
3	25 March 2011	Malé, Maldives	Cambodia	4–2	4–3	2012 AFC Challenge Cup qualification(AFC)
