= Kockar Ata =

Kockar Ata (Khodzha-Kochkari, Koçqər-i Chodja or Koçkır-i Baba) was a dervish of Ahmad Yasavi. "Ram" is the meaning of his name. According to common belief Koçkar Ata is from Teke Turcomans. In his time the people were making the rams fight and since his ram was the champion of each match, he was named as Kochkar. His birth name is not to be known. After Koçkar Ata's death, his ram could not resist the separation and it died on his grave. So a ram statue had been put over Koçkar Ata's grave. There is scripture in Arabic alphabet as"ya Allah, ya Muhammed, ya Ali".

Also, some Clans like "Koçgiri" and "Köşkerler" are named after him.

There are many legends about the city "Kochkor-Ata" in Kyrgyzstan and why that place became sacred. Some people say that Kockar/Kochkor Ata was a Muslim saint and was buried in that place after his death. Since then, the place of his burial became a place of pilgrimage for many people. Others connect the history of Kochkor Ata shrine with Kyrgyz folklore. Thus, Kazakh ethnographer Chokan Valikhanov mentions that Kazakh sultan Barak, who lived at the end of the 18th century, “became careless, and showing off his strength he invaded the sacred place of the Kyrgyz, Koshkar Ata.” The Kirghiz became angry, attacked Barak’s camp, and pursued his army as far as the Ili River. “The Kirghiz,” writes Valikhanov, “attributed their enemies’ escape to the holiness of Kochkor Ata" [Valikhanov 1985, p. 375]. There is another legend told by a man from Cholpon Ata, who said that Arslanbab (a mazar in Southern Kyrgyzstan) had seven children. And the seven mazars, Oisul Ata, Karakol Ata, Shïng Ata, Manzhïl Ata, Cholpon Ata, Kochkor Ata, Oluia Ata, were built in their honor [Abramzon 1975, p. 304]. In the Soviet period, as part of the effort to discourage Islamic practice, the authorities undertook severe measures to prevent worship at mazars.

== List of villages named after "Kockar Ata" ==
- Kyrgyzstan: 1.Kochkor-Ata, 2.Kochkor, 3.Ak-Kochkor, 4.Kochkar
- Tajikistan: Khodzha-Kochkari
- Russia: Kochkari (near Kazan in Tatarstan)
- Syria: Kouchkar (area of the Sis Afshars between the 14th and 16th centuries)
- Turkey: Koçgiri area (in Sivas), Koçkiran (in Iğdır)
