= Nikolai Bulgakov =

Russian footballer and coach (1960–2023)

Personal information
- Full name: Nikolai Mikhailovich Bulgakov
- Date of birth: 15 January 1960
- Place of birth: Kochkor-Ata, Osh Region, Kyrgyz SSR, USSR
- Date of death: 1 October 2023 (aged 63)
- Height: 1.83 m (6 ft 0 in)
- Position: Defender

Senior career*
Years	Team	Apps	(Gls)
1977–1980	FC Alga Frunze		
1980–1984	PFC CSKA Moscow	115	(1)
1985–1992	FC Iskra Smolensk	257	(0)
1993	FC Krylia Sovetov Samara	30	(0)
1994	FC Baltika Kaliningrad	36	(0)
1995–1999	FC Kristall Smolensk	149	(0)

Managerial career
- 2001: FC Oazis Yartsevo
- 2003: FC Kristall Smolensk (assistant)
- 2003: FC Kristall Smolensk (caretaker)
- * Club domestic league appearances and goals

Nikolai Mikhailovich Bulgakov (Russian: Николай Михайлович Булгаков; 15 January 1960 – 1 October 2023) was a Russian professional football coach and a player.

== Club career ==
Bulgakov made his professional debut in the Soviet Second League in 1977 for FC Alga Frunze.

== Death ==
Bulgakov died on 1 October 2023, at the age of 63.
