= Ivan Filatov =

Kyrgyz footballer

Personal information
- Date of birth: 11 March 1988 (age 38)
- Place of birth: Bishkek, Kyrgyzstan
- Height: 1.81 m (5 ft 11 in)
- Position: Forward

Senior career*
Years	Team	Apps	(Gls)
2007–2009	Nashe Pivo	?	(15+)
2009–2011	Abdysh-Ata Kant	?	(4)
2012–2014	Alga Bishkek	?	(19)
2014–2015	Abdysh-Ata Kant	?	(3)
2015	Alga Bishkek	?	(10)
2016	Sohar	9	(3)
2016	Alga Bishkek	?	(2)
2017	Minerva Punjab	6	(0)
2017	Abdysh-Ata Kant	?	(5)
2018–2019	Alga Bishkek	?	(9)

International career
2013–	Kyrgyzstan	3	(0)
- * Club domestic league appearances and goals

Ivan Filatov (born 11 March 1988) is a Kyrgyz professional footballer who plays as a forward. He last played for Alga Bishkek.

== Club career ==
=== Kyrgyzstan ===
Born and raised in Bishkek, Kyrgyzstan, Filatov began his professional footballing career in 2007 with Kyrgyzstan Second League side, FC Nashe Pivo. In his two-year spell with the Kant-based side, he finished with 40 goals in 58 appearances.

Impressed with his display in the lower division, Kyrgyzstani giants, FC Abdysh-Ata Kant confirmed him as their main forward for the next two seasons. He scored 26 goals in 40 appearances in his two-year spell for the Kyrgyzstan League side.

Later in 2011, Filatov moved to Bishkek where he signed a two-year contract with another Kyrgyzstan League side, FC Alga Bishkek. He scored 27 goals in 40 appearances for the Bishkek-based side.

In 2013, he moved back to Kant where he signed a short-term contract with his former side, Abdysh-Ata Kant. He scored 7 goals in 12 appearances in the 2013 Kyrgyzstan League.

Later in the season, he signed a two-year contract with his former side, Alga Bishkek. He scored 22 goals in 30 appearances in his two-year stint at the club.

=== Oman ===
Filatov first moved out of Kyrgyzstan in 2016 to Oman where on 17 January he signed a short-term contract with Oman Professional League side, Sohar SC. He made his Oman Professional League debut on 18 January 2016 in a 2–1 loss against Sur SC and scored his first goal on 22 January 2016 in a 3–3 draw against Dhofar S.C.S.C. He also made his debut in the Oman Professional League Cup on 27 March 2016 in the finals in a 1–0 loss against Al-Nasr S.C.S.C. He scored 3 goals in 9 appearances in the 2015–16 Oman Professional League.

=== Back to Kyrgyzstan ===
Later in 2016, he moved back to Kyrgyzstan and more accurately to his former club, Alga Bishkek for whom he scored 5 goals in 6 games in the 2016 Kyrgyzstan League.

=== India ===
Filatov moved to India in 2017 where on 15 January, he signed a six-month contract with I-League side, Minerva Punjab FC. He made his I-League debut on 17 January 2017 in a 4–0 loss against Indian giants, Mohun Bagan A.C.

== Career statistics ==
=== Club ===
Club	Season	Division	League		Cup		Continental		Other		Total	
Club	Season	Division	Apps	Goals	Apps	Goals	Apps	Goals	Apps	Goals	Apps	Goals
Sohar	2015–16	Oman Professional League	9	3	1	0	0	0	0	0	10	3
Sohar	Total		9	3	1	0	0	0	0	0	10	3
Alga Bishkek	2016	Kyrgyzstan League	6	5	0	0	0	0	0	0	6	5
Alga Bishkek	Total		6	5	0	0	0	0	0	0	6	5
Minerva Punjab	2016–17	I-League	6	0	0	0	0	0	0	0	6	0
Minerva Punjab	Total		5	0	0	0	0	0	0	0	5	0
Career total			21	8	1	0	0	0	0	0	22	8
