= KG United =

Kyrgyz football club

- Full name: KG United
- Founded: 2012
- Ground: Football centre FFKR, Kyrgyzstan
- Capacity: 1,000
- Manager: Rafik Amirov
- League: Kyrgyzstan League
- 2013: 8

KG United is a Kyrgyzstani football club based in Bishkek. It is made to support development of young players, as a farm club. This year play footballers born 1996, and younger.

== History ==
=== Names ===
- 2013: Renamed FC-96 Bishkek
- 2014: Renamed FC Manas
- 2015: Renamed KG United

=== Domestic history ===
Season	League									Kyrgyzstan Cup	Top goalscorer	
Season	Div.	Pos.	Pl.	W	D	L	GS	GA	P	Kyrgyzstan Cup	Name	League
2013	1st	8	20	1	0	19	7	107	3			
2014	1st	8	20	0	3	17	10	71	3			
2015	1st	6	20	1	1	18	15	82	4		Janybek-Ulu / Rajapov	3

== Links ==
- Article at Russian language (archived 20 February 2014)
