= Dragan Milovanović (footballer) =

Serbian footballer

Personal information
- Date of birth: 3 January 1986 (age 40)
- Place of birth: Brus, SFR Yugoslavia
- Height: 1.85 m (6 ft 1 in)
- Position: Forward

Senior career*
| Years | Team | Apps | (Gls) |
| 2003–2006 | Obilić | 9 | (1) |
| 2003–2005 | → Mladi Obilić (loan) | 16 | (3) |
| 2006–2008 | Napredak Kruševac | 25 | (12) |
| 2008–2010 | Borac Čačak | 38 | (4) |
| 2010–2011 | Čukarički | 8 | (0) |
| 2011 | Napredak Kruševac | 9 | (3) |
| 2011–2012 | Banat Zrenjanin | 27 | (7) |
| 2012 | Javor Ivanjica | 13 | (2) |
| 2013 | Radnički 1923 | 9 | (0) |
| 2014 | Dordoi Bishkek | 7 | (4) |
| 2014–2015 | Radnički 1923 | 17 | (4) |
| 2015–2016 | Metalac Gornji Milanovac | 23 | (5) |
| 2016–2017 | Jagodina | 21 | (5) |
| 2018 | Trayal Kruševac | 12 | (3) |
| 2018–2019 | Temnić 1924 | 20 | (17) |
| 2019–2020 | OFK Beograd | 9 | (2) |

International career
- Serbia U17
- Serbia U19
- Serbia U21
- * Club domestic league appearances and goals as of 19:58, 21 October 2019 (UTC)

Dragan Milovanović (Serbian Cyrillic: Драган Миловановић; born 1 March 1986) is a Serbian retired footballer who last played for OFK Beograd.

== Career ==
In 2014 Milovanović moved to Kyrgyzstan League side Dordoi Bishkek, winning his first trophy with Dordoi, the Kyrgyzstan Super Cup, on 24 March 2014. In August 2014, Milovanović returned to Serbia, signing for Serbian SuperLiga side Radnički 1923.

Previously Milovanović played for FK Obilić, FK Mladi Obilić, FK Napredak Kruševac and FK Borac Čačak.

== Career statistics ==
=== Club ===
Dordoi Bishkek
| Event | Apps | Goals |
|---|---|---|
| Leaguie | 7 | 4 |
| Cup | 1 | 2 |
| Super Cup | 1 | 2 |
| Ala-Too cup | 5 | 3 |
| Total | 14 | 11 |

== Honours ==
=== Club ===
Dordoi Bishkek

- Kyrgyzstan Super Cup Winner (1): 2014
