= Ivan Sivozhelezov =

Kazakhstani footballer (born 1985)

Personal information
- Full name: Ivan Vladimirovich Sivozhelezov
- Date of birth: 12 March 1985 (age 41)
- Place of birth: Jezkazgan, Kazakhstan
- Height: 1.96 m (6 ft 5 in)
- Position: Goalkeeper

Senior career*
| Years | Team | Apps | (Gls) |
| 2003-2004 | Kairat-2 | 33 | (0) |
| 2005-2006 | Atyrau | 18 | (0) |
| 2007-2008 | Vostok | 2 | (0) |
| 2009 | Okzhetpes | 3 | (0) |
| 2010 | Akzhayik | 6 | (0) |
| 2010-2011 | Atyrau | 4 | (0) |
| 2012 | Vostok | 5 | (0) |
| 2013 | Spartak (Semey) | 5 | (0) |
| 2013 | Sunkar | 15 | (0) |
| 2014 | Tobol | 0 | (0) |
| 2015 | Alga | | |
| 2017 | Makhtaaral | 8 | (0) |
- * Club domestic league appearances and goals

Ivan Vladimirovich Sivozhelezov (Russian: Иван Сивожелезов; born 12 March 1985) is a Kazakhstani former footballer who is last known to have played as a goalkeeper for Makhtaaral.

== Career ==
At the age of 21, Sivozhelezov made the most appearances during a season for his entire top flight career, for Atyrau.

Before the 2015 season, he signed for Alga in Kyrgyzstan after playing for Kazakhstani second division side Sunkar.
