= Yury Nedashkovsky =

Russian footballer (born 1986)

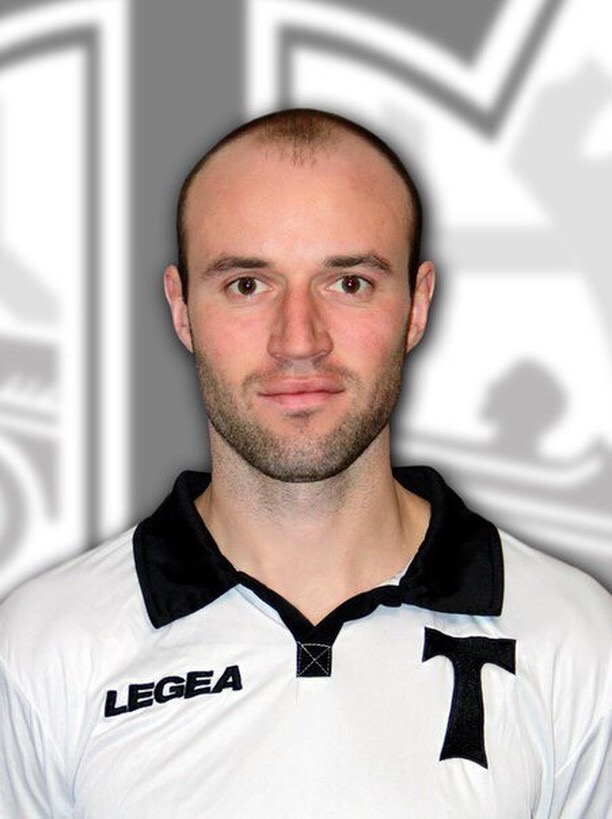

Personal information
- Full name: Yury Yuryevich Nedashkovsky
- Date of birth: 11 April 1986 (age 40)
- Place of birth: Kalynivka, Luhyny Raion, Zhytomyr Oblast, Ukrainian SSR, USSR
- Height: 1.84 m (6 ft 1/2 in)
- Positions: Defender; midfielder

Youth career
- RVUFK Kyiv

Senior career*
Years	Team	Apps	(Gls)
2003–2004	Dynamo-3 Kyiv	1	(0)
2006–2009	Okean Nakhodka	73	(2)
2010	Prialit Reutov	27	(5)
2011	Salyut Belgorod	5	(0)
2011–2013	Gubkin	48	(4)
2013–2014	Vityaz Podolsk	24	(3)
2014–2015	Khimki	15	(2)
2016	Spartak Kostroma	11	(0)
2016–2017	Torpedo Moscow	14	(1)
2017–2018	Khimik Novomoskovsk	37	(3)
2019–2021	Slavia Mozyr	63	(3)
2022	Dordoi Bishkek	10	(1)
2022	Rubin Yalta	4	(0)
2023	Baranovichi	3	(0)
- * Club domestic league appearances and goals

Yury Yuryevich Nedashkovsky (Russian: Юрий Юрьевич Недашковский; born 11 April 1986) is a Russian former professional football player.

== Career ==
Nedashkovsky started his professional career in the third team Dynamo Kyiv. After serving in the army, he moved to Russia, where he joined the PFL club Ocean Nakhodka. In 2011 he played for Salyut Belgorod and helped the team winning the Center zone of Russian Second Division. He continued playing in Russian third-level leagues for various clubs including Khimki and Torpedo Moscow.

In winter 2019, the defender moved to Belarus and signed a contract with the Belarusian Premier League team Slavia Mozyr. He made his debut for Slavia on March 31 in the first round match against Dynamo Minsk. In the match, Nedashkovsky was sent off in the 90th minute.

== Personal life ==
Nedashkovsky has a channel on YouTube As of October 2021, it has 57 thousand subscribers and 6.7 million views.
