= Alan Koroyev =

Russian footballer

Personal information
- Full name: Alan Vitalyevich Koroyev
- Date of birth: 19 April 1998 (age 28)
- Place of birth: Ardon, Russia
- Height: 1.76 m (5 ft 9 in)
- Positions: Midfielder; forward

Youth career
- –2014: Alania Vladikavkaz
- 2014–2016: CSKA Moscow
- 2016: Krasnodar

Senior career*
Years	Team	Apps	(Gls)
2016–2017	Kolomna	20	(3)
2017–2018	Sevastopol	4	(0)
2018	FC Nog Faltar Olginskoye		
2019	FC Saturn-2 Ramenskoye		
2019	Khimik-Arsenal	11	(3)
2020	West Armenia	1	(0)
2020	Slutsk	11	(0)
2020	Krasny	2	(0)
2021	Favorite-VD-Kafa Feodosia	4	(1)
2021	Ocean Kerch	8	(1)
2022	Nur-Batken	23	(3)
2023	AFC Uttara	2	(0)
- * Club domestic league appearances and goals as of 31 December 2023

Alan Vitalyevich Koroyev (Russian: Алан Витальевич Короев; born 19 April 1998) is a Russian professional footballer who plays as a striker.

== Club career ==
He made his debut in the Russian Professional Football League for Kolomna on 28 August 2016 in a game against Tekstilshchik Ivanovo.
