= Manas Zhutanov =

Kyrgystani footballer

Personal information
- Full name: Manas Bakyt Uulu Zhutanov
- Date of birth: 22 August 1991 (age 35)
- Place of birth: Kara-Kulja, Kyrgyz SSR
- Height: 1.84 m (6 ft 0 in)
- Position: Defender

Senior career*
Years	Team	Apps	(Gls)
2008	FC Lokomotiv Sterlitamak		
2009–2011	FC KAMAZ-2 Naberezhnye Chelny		
2011–2014	FC KAMAZ Naberezhnye Chelny	42	(7)
2015	FC Ararat Ufa		
2016–2017	FC Abdysh-Ata Kant	15	(3)
2017	FC Vityaz-GTU Ufa		
2018	FC Neftchi Kochkor-Ata		
- * Club domestic league appearances and goals

Manas Bakyt Uulu Zhutanov (Russian: Манас Бакыт Уулу Жутанов; born 22 August 1991) is a Kyrgyzstani former footballer who played as a defender.

== Club career ==
He made his professional debut for FC KAMAZ Naberezhnye Chelny on 17 October 2011 in a Russian Football National League game against FC Khimki.
