= 2016 Kyrgyzstan League =

Kyrgyzstan League
- Season: 2016
- Champions: Alay Osh
- AFC Cup: Alay Osh; Dordoi Bishkek
- Matches: 63
- Goals: 241 (3.83 per match)
- Biggest home win: Dordoi Bishkek 13-0 Aldiyer Kurshab
- Biggest away win: Aldiyer Kurshab 1-12 Alay Osh
- Highest scoring: Dordoi Bishkek 13-0 Aldiyer Kurshab; Aldiyer Kurshab 1-12 Alay Osh

The 2016 Kyrgyzstan League was the 25th season of Kyrgyzstan League, the Football Federation of Kyrgyz Republic's top division of association football. Alay Osh are the defending champions, having won the previous season.

== Teams ==
Locations of teams in the 2016 Kyrgyzstan League

Note: Table lists in alphabetical order.

Team	Location	Venue	Capacity	Manager	Captain
Abdysh-Ata Kant	Kant	Abdysh-Ata Stadium	3,000	(Kyrgyzstan) Mirlan Eshenov	(Kyrgyzstan) Tahir Avchiev
Ala Too Naryn	Bishkek	Dordoi Stadium	850	(Kyrgyzstan) Murat Dzhumakeev	(Kyrgyzstan) Yrysbek uulu Zhanboto
Alay Osh	Osh	Suyumbayev Stadium	11,200	(Kyrgyzstan) Bakytbek Mamatov	(Kyrgyzstan) Ilyaz Alimov
Aldier Kurshab	Jalal-Abad	Kurmanbek Stadium	1,500	(Kyrgyzstan) Aibek Sulaimanov	(Kyrgyzstan) Askarbek Muratov
Alga Bishkek	Bishkek	KSIPC&S Stadium	18,500	(Kyrgyzstan) Aleksandr Beldinov	(Kyrgyzstan) Ildar Amirov
Dordoi Bishkek	Bishkek	Dordoi Stadium	18,500	(Kyrgyzstan) Anarbek Ormombekov	(Kyrgyzstan) Talant Samsaliev
Kara-Balta	Kara-Balta	Manas Stadium	4,000	(Kyrgyzstan) Nurzhan Dzhetybaev	(Kyrgyzstan) Evgeny Ponomarev

== League table ==
Pos	Team	Pld	W	D	L	GF	GA	GD	Pts	Qualification or relegation
1	Alay Osh (C)	18	14	3	1	59	10	+49	45	2017 AFC Cup
2	Dordoi Bishkek	18	13	4	1	52	18	+34	43	2017 AFC Cup
3	Alga Bishkek	18	12	3	3	37	20	+17	39	
4	Abdysh-Ata Kant	18	6	4	8	28	23	+5	22	
5	Kara-Balta	18	4	2	12	30	59	−29	14	
6	Ala-Too	18	3	1	14	15	39	−24	10	
7	Aldier Kurshab	18	2	1	15	20	72	−52	7	

Updated to match(es) played on 29 October 2016. Source: Football League of Kyrgyzstan
Rules for classification: 1) points; 2) goal difference; 3) number of goals scored.
(C) Champions

== Results ==
=== First round ===
Home \ Away	AAK	ATN	AOS	AKU	ABI	DBI	KAB
Abdysh-Ata		2–0	0–1	3–1	0–1	0–1	4–1
Ala Too Naryn	0–2		2–4	0–2	1–0	1–5	4–1
Alay Osh	3–0	4–0		2–2	1–0	4–0	6–0
Aldier Kurshab	0–2	3–0	1–5		1–3	1–3	5–1
Alga Bishkek	2–1	2–0	1–0	4–4		0–0	5–2
Dordoi Bishkek	2–1	3–1	1–1	1–0	2–1		4–1
Kara-Balta	1–1	2–1	1–4	4–2	2–3	1–6	

Updated to match(es) played on 2 July 2016. Source: Soccerway
Legend: Blue = home team win; Yellow = draw; Red = away team win.

=== Second round ===
Home \ Away	AAK	ATN	AOS	AKU	ABI	DBI	KAB
Abdysh-Ata		1–1		5–0		3–3	
Ala Too Naryn			0–3	0–2			0–1
Alay Osh	2–0					1–1	5–0
Aldiyer Kurshab		0–3	1–12		0–2		
Alga Bishkek	2–1		0–1				4–1
Dordoi Bishkek		2–1		13–0	3–1		
Kara-Balta	2–2			9–1		0–2	

Updated to match(es) played on 29 October 2016. Source: Soccerway
Legend: Blue = home team win; Yellow = draw; Red = away team win.

== Top scorers ==
As of Match played 29 October 2016

Rank	Player	Club	Goals
1	(Guinea) Alia Sylla	Alay	20
2	(Kyrgyzstan) Maksadbek Alimov	Alay	14
3	(Kyrgyzstan) Mirbek Ahmataliev	Alga/Dordoi	12
4	(Kyrgyzstan) Roman Kovalev	Kara-Balta	10
5	(Kyrgyzstan) Abdrasulov uulu Manas	Aldier	8
5	(Kyrgyzstan) Ildar Amirov	Alga	8
7	(Kyrgyzstan) Kairat Zhyrgalbek Uulu	Dordoi	7
8	(Kyrgyzstan) Almazbek Mirzaliev	Dordoi	6
8	(Kyrgyzstan) David Tetteh	Dordoi	6
8	(Kyrgyzstan) Zhumagulov	Ala Too	6

=== Hat-tricks ===
Player	For	Against	Result	Date	Ref.
(Kyrgyzstan) Mirbek Akmataliev	Alga Bishkek	Kara-Balta	5–2	16 April 2016	
(Guinea) Alia Silla^{4}	Alay Osh	Aldiyer Kurshab	5–1	30 April 2016	
(Kyrgyzstan) Abdrasulov uulu Manas	Aldiyer Kurshab	Alga Bishkek	4–4	18 June 2016	
(Kyrgyzstan) Abdrasulov uulu Manas	Aldiyer Kurshab	Kara-Balta	5–1	25 June 2016	
(Kyrgyzstan) Roman Kovalev^{5}	Kara-Balta	Aldiyer Kurshab	9–1	23 September 2016	
(Nigeria) Aleriwa Oluwatosin	Abdish Ata	Aldiyer Kurshab	5–0	14 October 2016	
(Kyrgyzstan) Maksadbek Alimov^{5}	Alay	Aldiyer Kurshab	12–1	21 October 2016	
(Mali) Alia Sylla^{5}	Alay	Aldiyer Kurshab	12–1	21 October 2016	
(Kyrgyzstan) Aman Talantbek	Dordoi	Aldiyer Kurshab	13–0	25 October 2016	
(Niger) Ousmane Zeidine Ahmeye^{5}	Dordoi	Aldiyer Kurshab	13–0	25 October 2016	

- ^{4} Player scored 4 goals
- ^{4} Player scored 5 goals
