= 2011 Kyrgyzstan League =

Kyrgyzstan League
- Season: 2011
- Champions: Dordoi
- AFC President's Cup: Dordoi
- Matches: 192
- Goals: 600 (3.13 per match)
- Top goalscorer: Vladimir Verevkin (12)

The 2011 Kyrgyzstan League season was the 20th edition of the Kyrgyzstan League. It started on 17 April 2011 with six teams taking part. The final matchday was held on 22 October 2011.

== Clubs ==
Locations of teams in the 2011 Kyrgyzstan League

The championship will be consisting of four round-robins, so each team will play in 20 games.

- FC Neftchi Kochkor-Ata
- FC Dordoi Bishkek
- Abdish-Ata Kant
- Alga Bishkek
- Alay Osh
- FC Issyk Kul (Karakol)

== League table ==
Pos	Team	Pld	W	D	L	GF	GA	GD	Pts	Qualification
1	Dordoi Bishkek	20	15	3	2	54	12	+42	48	2012 AFC President's Cup
2	Neftchi Kochkor-Ata	20	12	5	3	32	14	+18	41	
3	Abdish-Ata Kant	20	10	4	6	37	24	+13	34	
4	Alga Bishkek	20	7	5	8	29	36	−7	26	
5	Alay Osh	20	5	3	12	25	36	−11	18	
6	Issyk Kul	20	1	0	19	8	63	−55	3	

Updated to match(es) played on 29 October 2011. Source: fifa.com
Rules for classification: 1) points; 2) goal difference; 3) number of goals scored.

=== Results table ===
The results of the first two-round were:

Home \ Away	AAK	AOS	ALG	DOR	ISS	NKA
Abdish-Ata Kant		2–1	0–0	3–0	2–0	0–0
Alay Osh	0–1		3–1	0–4	3–1	1–2
Alga Bishkek	3–2	2–1		2–4	3–2	0–3
Dordoi Bishkek	4–0	0–0	5–2		2–1	0–0
Issyk Kul	1–9	2–0	1–3	0–4		0–1
Neftchi Kochkor-Ata	2–0	2–2	1–1	0–0	4–0	

Source: Soccerway
Legend: Blue = home team win; Yellow = draw; Red = away team win.

The results of the second two-round were:

Home \ Away	AAK	AOS	ALG	DOR	ISS	NKA
Abdish-Ata Kant		2–3	2–0	3–2	3–0	1–0
Alay Osh	1–1		1–1	1–4	3–0	0–2
Alga Bishkek	2–2	2–1		1–1	3–0	1–2
Dordoi Bishkek	3–0	2–0	4–1		3–0	2–0
Issyk Kul	0–3	0–3	0–3	0–3		0–3
Neftchi Kochkor-Ata	2–1	2–1	1–0	0–4	3–0	

Source: Soccerway
Legend: Blue = home team win; Yellow = draw; Red = away team win.

== Top goalscorers ==
The top scorers are:

Rank	Scorer	Club	Goals
1	(Kyrgyzstan) Vladimir Verevkin	Alga Bishkek	12
2	(Kyrgyzstan) Kayumzhan Sharipov	Dordoi	10
3	(Kyrgyzstan) (Ghana) David Tetteh	Dordoi	9
4	(Kyrgyzstan) Ruslan Djamshidov	Neftchi	7
4	(Kyrgyzstan) (Russia) Anton Zemlianukhin	Abdish-Ata Kant	7
4	(Kyrgyzstan) Almaz Mirzaliev	Abdish-Ata Kant	7
