= FC Ala-Too Naryn =

Kyrgyz football club

Ala-Too Naryn
- Full name: FC Ala-Too Naryn
- Founded: 1992; 33 years ago
- Ground: Naryn, Kyrgyzstan
- League: Kyrgyzstan League
- 2015: 5th

FC Ala-Too Naryn is a Kyrgyzstani football club based in Naryn, Kyrgyzstan that played in the top division in Kyrgyzstan, the Kyrgyzstan League.

== History ==
Ala-Too Naryn was founded in 1992, taking part in the first season of the Kyrgyzstan League, finishing in 12th place before disbanding at the end of the season.

Ala-Too Naryn was revived in 2012 as a farm club to Dordoi Bishkek.

=== Domestic history ===
Season	League									Kyrgyzstan Cup	Top goalscorer		Managers
Season	Div.	Pos.	Pl.	W	D	L	GS	GA	P	Kyrgyzstan Cup	Name	League	Managers
1992	1st	12	22	2	4	16	12	78	8				
2012	1st	6	28	9	3	16	39	50	30				
2013	1st	5	20	11	3	6	41	23	36				
2014	1st	5	20	7	2	11	29	34	13				
2015	1st	5	20	4	1	15	17	42	13		(Kyrgyzstan) Sagynbaev	3	
