= Ousmane Zeidine Ahmeye =

Nigerien footballer

Personal information
- Full name: Ousmane Zeidine Ahmeye
- Date of birth: June 9, 1994 (age 32)
- Place of birth: Akokan, Niger
- Height: 1.87 m (6 ft 2 in)
- Position: Forward

Youth career
- 2009–2012: AS FAN Academy

Senior career*
Years	Team	Apps	(Gls)
2012–2013	Akokana		
2013–2014	Angers II	15	(0)
2014–2016	Saint-Colomban Sportive	6	(1)
2016	Dordoi Bishkek		(5)
2018	Heartland		(5)
2018–2019	Enugu Rangers		(5)

International career^{‡}
2013–	Niger	1	(0)
- * Club domestic league appearances and goals as of 26 October 2016 ‡ National team caps and goals as of 26 October 2016

Ousmane Zeidine Ahmeye (born 9 June 1994), is a Nigerien footballer who plays as a forward/attacker. Zeidine Ahmeye joined Akokana FC d'Arlit (Niger) in November 2012, moved to Angers SCO and Saint-Colomban Locminé (France) in August 2013 and July 2014. He exited Saint-Colomban Locminé in July 2015, and played for FC Dordoi Bishkek (Kyrgyzstan) in 2016. Since May 2018, Zeidine Ahmeye plays under Heartland FC (Nigeria).

== Career ==
=== Club ===
In June 2013, Ahmeye signed for French Ligue 2 side Angers. On 17 August 2016, Ahmeye signed for Kyrgyzstan League side Dordoi Bishkek.

=== International ===
Ahmeye made his debut for the Niger national team against Burkina Faso on 23 March 2013.

== Career statistics ==
=== International ===
Niger national team
Year	Apps	Goals
2013	1	0
Total	1	0

Statistics accurate as of match played 23 March 2013

== Honours ==
=== Club ===
Dordoi Bishkek

- Kyrgyzstan Cup (1): 2016
