= FC Nur-Batken =

Kyrgyz football club

- Full name: Football Club Nur-Batken; Футбольный Клуб Нур-Баткен
- Founded: 2018; 8 years ago
- Ground: Zentralny Stadion; Batken, Kyrgyzstan
- Capacity: 4,000
- Manager: Bakytbek Mamatov
- League: Kyrgyz Premier League
- 2022: Kyrgyz Premier League, 7th of 10

Football Club Nur-Batken (Kyrgyz: Футбольный Клуб Нур-Баткен) is a Kyrgyzstani football club based in Batken, Kyrgyzstan that plays in the Kyrgyz Premier League - the top division of Kyrgyz football. The club was founded in 2018, and plays at Zentralny Stadion.

== History ==
The club was founded in 2018, and was officially registered with the Ministry of Justice on 29 April 2019.

They made their domestic debut in the 2019 Keurgeuz Birinchi Ligaseu, the second division of Kyrgyz football, where they finished 4th out of 10 teams. In the same year, they came 2nd in the Ferghana Akimi Cup. Following, the cancellation of the 2020 season due to COVID-19, the team won the Keurgeuz Birinchi Ligaseu in 2021, leading to their promotion to the Kyrgyz Premier League in 2022.

== Honours ==
- Ferghana Akimi Cup
  - Winners (1): 2019

== Players ==
=== Current squad ===
As of 6 November 2022

Note: Flags indicate national team as defined under FIFA eligibility rules; some limited exceptions apply. Players may hold more than one non-FIFA nationality.

No.	Pos.	Nation	Player
1	GK	UZB	Islomzhon Abdullakhanov
2	DF	KGZ	Elaman Abdumalik Uulu
4	DF	UZB	Sukhrob Rakhmonov
5	DF	KGZ	Duyshonaaly Altynbek uulu
6	DF	UZB	Solibek Karimov
6	MF	KGZ	Alikhan Aydarbek Uulu
7	MF	KGZ	Keldibek Talantbek uulu
8	MF	KGZ	Murolimzhon Akhmedov
9	MF	KGZ	Shohdzhakhon Satikhonov
10	FW	KGZ	Azamat Omuraliev
11	FW	UZB	Dostonzhon Rashidov
13	DF	UZB	Elnurbek Turgunov

No.	Pos.	Nation	Player
16	MF	KGZ	Emilbek Shadyev
17	DF	KGZ	Erlan Mashirapov
18	MF	KGZ	Kasym Zholdoshbay Uulu
19	DF	KGZ	Sanzhar Sharsheev
20	FW	UZB	Nodirbek Ibragimov
21	FW	RUS	Alan Koroyev
22	MF	KGZ	Sultanbek Momunov
35	GK	UZB	Ganizhon Kobilov
71	GK	UZB	Kazbek Artikbaev
77	DF	UZB	Sheroz Jalolov
-	MF	KGZ	Shakhrukh Askarov
-	DF	RUS	Radion Chibiev
