= 2012 Kyrgyzstan League =

Kyrgyzstan League
- Season: 2012
- Champions: Dordoi Bishkek
- Relegated: Khimik
- AFC President's Cup: Dordoi Bishkek
- Matches: 266
- Goals: 824 (3.1 per match)
- Top goalscorer: Kayumjan Sharipov (17)

The 2012 Kyrgyzstan League season was the 21st edition of the Kyrgyzstan League. It started on 14 April 2012 with participation of eight teams. The new official name of the league was Top-Liga.

== Clubs ==
Locations of teams in the 2012 Kyrgyzstan League
- Abdish-Ata Kant
- Ala Too Naryn
- Alay Osh
- Alga Bishkek
- Dinamo Bishkek
- Dordoi Bishkek
- FC-95 Bishkek
- Khimik Kara-Balta

== League table ==
| Pos | Team | Pld | W | D | L | GF | GA | GD | Pts | Qualification |
|---|---|---|---|---|---|---|---|---|---|---|
| 1 | Dordoi Bishkek | 28 | 24 | 2 | 2 | 89 | 17 | +72 | 74 | 2013 AFC President's Cup |
| 2 | Alga Bishkek | 28 | 18 | 4 | 6 | 61 | 26 | +35 | 58 | |
| 3 | Alay Osh | 28 | 14 | 7 | 7 | 45 | 27 | +18 | 49 | |
| 4 | Dinamo Bishkek | 28 | 14 | 6 | 8 | 51 | 35 | +16 | 48 | |
| 5 | Abdish-Ata Kant | 28 | 13 | 8 | 7 | 51 | 21 | +30 | 47 | |
| 6 | Ala Too Naryn | 28 | 9 | 3 | 16 | 39 | 50 | −11 | 30 | |
| 7 | Khimik Kara-Balta | 28 | 2 | 1 | 25 | 14 | 94 | −80 | 7 | |
| 8 | FC-95 Bishkek | 28 | 2 | 1 | 25 | 13 | 93 | −80 | 7 | |

Updated to match(es) played on 13 November 2012. Source: https://www.fifa.com/associations/association=kgz/nationalleague/standings.html
Rules for classification: 1) points; 2) goal difference; 3) number of goals scored.

== Top goal-scorers ==
The top scorers are:

| Rank | Scorer | Club | Goals (Pen.) |
|---|---|---|---|
| 1 | (Kyrgyzstan) Kayumjan Sharipov | Dordoi Bishkek | 17 |
| 2 | (Russia) / (Kyrgyzstan) Sergei Kaleutin | Abdish-Ata (12) /Dordoi Bishkek (4) | 16 |
| 2 | (Kyrgyzstan) Azamat Baymatov | Dordoi Bishkek | 16 |
| 4 | (Kyrgyzstan) Tursunali Rustamov | Alga Bishkek | 12 |
| 5 | (Kyrgyzstan) / (Cameroon) Claude Maka Kum | Dordoi Bishkek | 10 |
| 6 | (Kyrgyzstan) Mirbek Akmataliyev | Dinamo Bishkek | 8 |
| 6 | (Kyrgyzstan) Vladimir Verevkin | Alga Bishkek | 8 |
| 6 | (Kyrgyzstan) Ruslan Djamshidov | Alga Bishkek | 8 |
| 6 | (Kyrgyzstan) Yevgeniy Doroginskiy | Ala-Too Naryn | 8 |
| 6 | (Kyrgyzstan) Khurshit Lutfullayev | Dinamo Bishkek (5) / Abdish-Ata (3) | 8 |
