= Kyrgyzstan Super Cup =

- Founded: 2011; 15 years ago
- Region: Asia (AFC)
- Teams: 2
- Current champions: Abdysh-Ata Kant (2nd title) (2025)
- Most championships: Dordoi Bishkek (6 titles)
- 2025 Kyrgyzstan Super Cup

The Kyrgyzstan Super Cup is a football competition, held at the beginning of each domestic season and disputed between the winners of Kyrgyzstan League and the winners of Kyrgyzstan Cup. The first Kyrgyzstan Super Cup was held on 9 April 2011 at the Central Stadium in Kant, and was competed between Neftchi Kochkor-Ata and Dordoi Bishkek.

== Winners ==
Season	Date	Winner	Goal Scorer	Score	Goal Scorer	Runner-up	Venue	Attendance
2011		Neftchi Kochkor-Ata	Pavel Pavlov; Yevgeniy Pilipas	2 – 1	Kharchenko	Dordoi Bishkek		
2012	31 March 2012	Dordoi Bishkek	Baymatov 31'; Kharchenko	3 – 1	Zemlianukhin 32'	Abdish-Ata Kant		
2012	8 April 2012	Dordoi Bishkek	Previato 78', 85'	2 – 0		Abdish-Ata Kant	Spartak Stadium; Bishkek	
2013	21 April 2013	Dordoi Bishkek	Murzaev 10', 78'; Kaleutin 41'	3 – 0		Alga Bishkek	Spartak Stadium; Bishkek	
2013	27 April 2013	Dordoi Bishkek	Murzaev; Tetteh 36'	3 – 2	Filatov 59'; Mulajanov 70'	Alga Bishkek		
2014	24 March 2014	Dordoi Bishkek	Milovanović 29' (pen.), 86'; Baymatov 79'	3 – 0	S.Rakhmonov (yellow card) 25' (yellow-red card) 70'	Alay Osh	Spartak Stadium; Bishkek	
2015	Not played							
2016	8 March 2016	Abdysh-Ata Kant		1 – 0		Alay Osh		
2017	3 March 2017	Alay Osh		4 – 1		Dordoi Bishkek		
2018	1 April 2018	Alay Osh		2 – 2 (aet; 4 – 2 p)		Dordoi Bishkek		
2019	14 July 2019	Dordoi Bishkek	Valikayev 19'; Batyrkanov 75'	2 – 1	Akhmataliev 51'	Alay Osh	Suyumbayev Stadion	
2020	3 March 2020	Not played						
2021	1 July 2021	Dordoi Bishkek	Zhyrgalbek Uulu 21'; Borubaev 97', 120+4'	3 – 1 (a.e.t.)	Bikmaykin 3'	Alay Osh	Bishkek	
2022	10 September 2022	Dordoi Bishkek	Joel Kojo 90+5'	1 – 1 (aet; 5 – 4 p) (a.e.t.)	Azamat Baymatov 57'	Neftchi Kochkor-Ata		
2023	8 March 2023	Alay Osh		1–0		Abdysh-Ata Kant	Suyumbayev Stadion	
2024	20 October 2024	Abdysh-Ata Kant	Kayrat Jırgalbek uulu 25'	1–0		Muras United	Stadion imeni Dolena Omurzakova	
2025	1 March 2025	Abdysh-Ata Kant		0–0 (a.e.t.) (4–3 pen)		Muras United		
2026	19 August 2026	Bars	Bekzhan Sagynbayev 45+6' 47'	2–0		Dordoi Bishkek	Sportkompleks Alga, Bishkek	

== Top-performing clubs ==
Club	Winners	Runners-up	Winning years
FC Dordoi Bishkek	6	4	2012, 2013, 2014, 2019, 2021, 2022
FC Alay Osh	3	4	2017, 2018, 2023
FC Abdysh-Ata Kant	3	2	2016, 2024, 2025
FC Neftchi Kochkor-Ata	1	1	2011
FC Bars	1	0	2025
FC Alga Bishkek	–	1	2015
Muras United	–	2	2024, 2025
