= Vladimir Khoroshunov =

Kyrgyzstani footballer (born 1984)

Personal information
- Date of birth: 3 September 1984 (age 42)
- Place of birth: Soviet Union
- Position: Midfielder

Team information
- Current team: FC Kara-Balta (manager)
–2011	FC Alga Bishkek		
2012–2013	FC Abdysh-Ata Kant		
2014–2015	FC Kara-Balta	16	(5)

International career
Years	Team	Apps	(Gls)
	Kyrgyzstan	1	(0)

Vladimir Khoroshunov (born 3 September 1984) is a Kyrgyzstani football manager and former player. He is a manager at FC Kara-Balta. He was a member of the Kyrgyzstan national team.
