= Ruslan Jamshidov =

Kyrgyzstani footballer

Personal information
- Full name: Ruslan Jamshidov
- Date of birth: 22 August 1979 (age 47)
- Place of birth: Soviet Union
- Position: Forward

Senior career*
Years	Team	Apps	(Gls)
1996–2002	Alga Bishkek	96	(23)
2002–2004	Zhetysu	48	(5)
2004–2009	Alga Bishkek	114	(51)
2009–2011	FC Neftchi Kochkor-Ata	40	(16)
2012–2015	Alga Bishkek	?	(23)

International career^{‡}
1999–2011	Kyrgyzstan	28	(3)
- * Club domestic league appearances and goals as of 1 January 2019 ‡ National team caps and goals as of 1 January 2019

Ruslan Jamshidov (born 22 August 1979) is a retired Kyrgyzstani footballer who is a striker. He last played for Alga Bishkek. He was a member of the Kyrgyzstan national football team.

== Career statistics ==
=== International ===
Kyrgyzstan national team
Year	Apps	Goals
1999	3	0
2000	3	0
2001	6	0
2006	7	1
2007	4	2
2008	3	0
2009	1	0
2011	1	0
Total	28	3

Statistics accurate as of match played 28 July 2011

=== International goals ===
#	Date	Venue	Opponent	Score	Result	Competition
1	9 April 2006	Dhaka, Bangladesh	Palestine	1–0	1–0	2006 AFC Challenge Cup
2	19 August 2007	New Delhi India	Cambodia	3–3	4–3	2007 Nehru Cup
3	24 August 2007	New Delhi India	Cambodia	3–0	3–0	2007 Nehru Cup
