= FC Aldiyer Kurshab =

Kyrgyz football club

Aldiyer Kurshab
- Full name: FC Aldiyer Kurshab
- Founded: 1994; 31 years ago
- Ground: Kurshab, Kyrgyzstan
- Capacity: 300
- Manager: Aybek Sulaymanov
- League: Kyrgyzstan League
- 2014: 5th
Home colours	Away colours

FC Aldiyer Kurshab is a football club that plays in the Kyrgyzstan League, the top division in Kyrgyzstan.

== History ==
- 19??: Founded as FC Aldiyer Kurshab.

== Achievements ==
- Kyrgyzstan League: 0
  - 9th place, Zone B: 1998
- Kyrgyzstan League Second Level: 1
  - Winner: 2013
