= FC Issyk-Kol Karakol =

Kyrgyz football club

Issyk Kol Karakol
- Full name: FC Issyk Kol Karakol
- Founded: 2000
- Ground: Karakol, Kyrgyzstan
- League: Kyrgyzstan League
- 2011: 6th

FC Issyk Kol Karakol is a Kyrgyzstani football club based in Karakol that plays in the top division in Kyrgyzstan, the Kyrgyzstan League. This is their first participation in the top division of Kyrgyzstan football.

== History ==
- 19??: Founded as FC Issyk Kol Przhevalsk.
- 1992: Renamed FC Issyk Kol Karakol.
- 1998: Renamed FC Karakol.
- 1999: Renamed FC Issyk Kol Karakol.
- 2003: Renamed FC Kol-Tor Karakol.
- 2004: Renamed FC Issyk Kol Karakol.
- 2011: Dissolved after spring round.

== Achievements ==
Kyrgyzstan League:

- 5th place: 2003

Kyrgyzstan Cup:
