= FC Nashe Pivo =

Kyrgyz football club

Nashe Pivo
- Full name: Football Club Nashe Pivo
- Founded: 2003; 23 years ago
- Ground: Stadion Sportkompleks Abdysh-Ata, Kant, Kyrgyzstan
- Capacity: 2,000

FC Nashe, also known as Nashe Pivo, (Russian: ФК «Наше пиво») is a Kyrgyz football club based in Kant. It's a farm club of FC Abdish-Ata Kant.

== History ==
- 2003: Founded as FC Abdish-Ata-2 Kant
- May 2003: Renamed to FC Nashe Pivo Kant

Nashe Pivo reached the Kyrgyzstan Cup final for the first time in 2015, where they were defeated 4–2 by parent club Abdysh-Ata Kant.

== Achievements ==
Kyrgyzstan Cup:

- Finalist: 2015

== See also ==
- FC Zhivoye Pivo
