= Kochkor-Ata =

Kochkor-Ata (Kyrgyz: Кочкор-Ата)
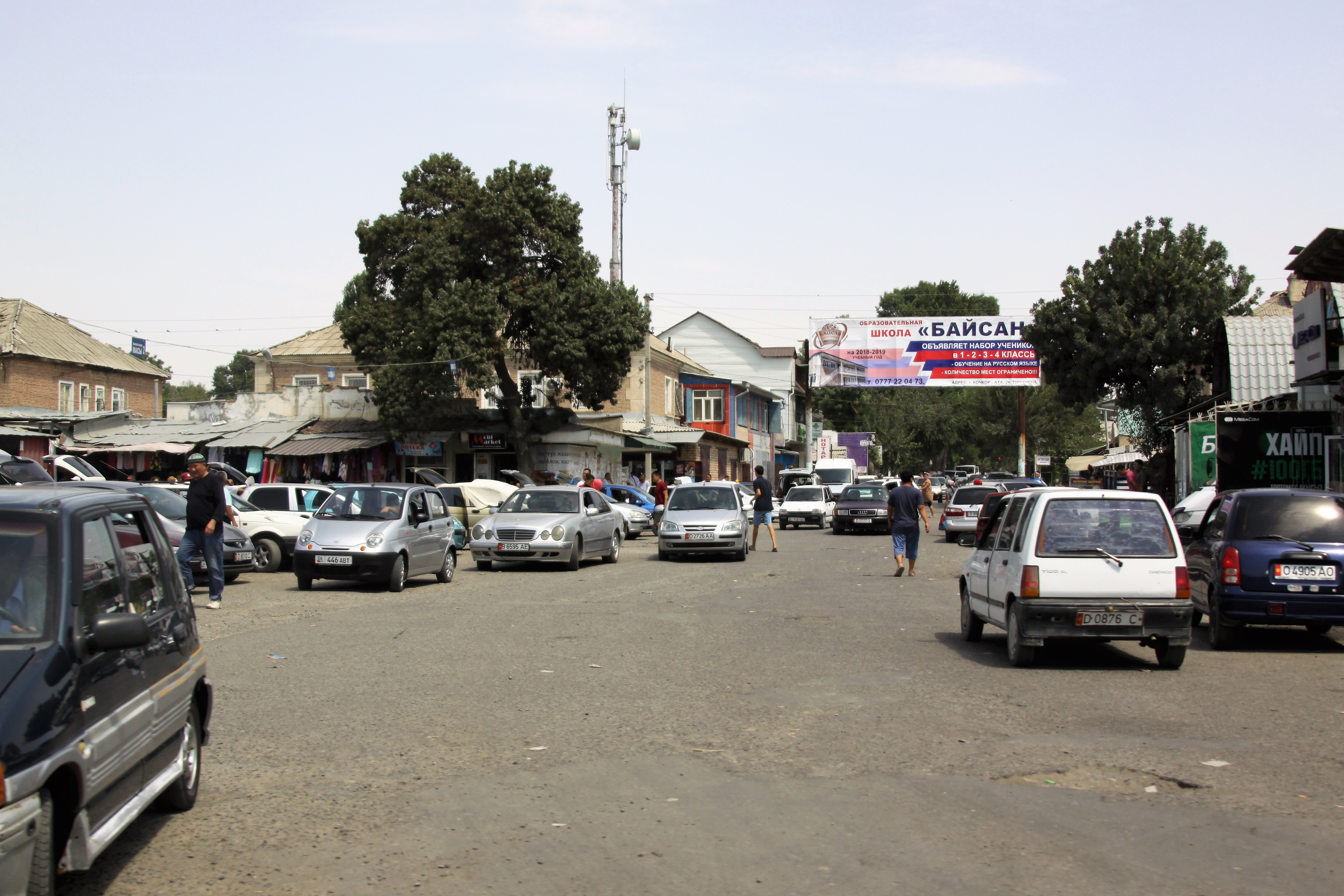
- the bazar in Kochkor-Ata.

- Location in Kyrgyzstan
- Coordinates: 41°01′55″N 72°29′0″E
- Country: Kyrgyzstan
- Region: Jalal-Abad Region
- District: Nooken District
- Established: 1952

Area
  - Total: 4.85 km^{2} (1.87 sq mi)

Population (2021)
  - Total: 17,476
  - Density: 3,600/km^{2} (9,330/sq mi)

Kochkor-Ata (Kyrgyz: Кочкор-Ата) is a Kyrgyz town located northwest of the major city Jalal-Abad in Kyrgyzstan. Its population was 17,476 in 2021. The town is located along the major Bishkek-Osh route, approximately 3 miles from the Kyrgyzstan-Uzbekistan border. The settlement Kochkor-Ata was established in 1952 in regard with discovery and exploitation of Izbaskent oil field. In 2003, it was granted town status.

The town itself maintains a high level of contrasting polarity. The center of the town, by the bazaar and municipal buildings, highlights a late Soviet-era style of structural design and color. Large concrete structures painted in bright colors outline central avenues and plazas. Soviet propaganda is still framed high on old billboards and posters. "Oil is the strength of the people," reads one of the central banners. However, much of Kochkor-Ata is rural. East of the central plaza past the Soviet-era concrete housing complexes, lie the mainstay of the Kochkor-Ata population. Small shacks and houses lined closely to each other, stepped along the foothills of the local mountain range, house many of the local inhabitants. Animal husbandry and small-trade provide many of these villagers with a means of income.

The town boasts a relatively new clothing bazaar, predominantly built by funds from Kyrgyz ex-president, Askar Akayev, alongside an older established bazaar.

The bazaar is the center of commerce, in the small town. It is one of the local stops along the Bishkek-Osh route, and thus maintains a daily flow of inter-and-intra related trade and small commerce. The avto-vaksal, or bus/taxi station, is also located in the western end of the bazaar. The local marshrutka, public transport van, runs from the Kochkor-Ata avto-vaksal to other towns along the route, most notably: Massy, Bazar-Korgon, and Jalal-Abad.

One of the larger oil fields in Kochkor-Ata has been bought out by Chinese business and interests.

The town has four middle schools: one Russian school, one Kyrgyz boarding school, and two other regular Kyrgyz schools. The town is also host of a fairly new football stadium, built by funds of a prominent Kyrgyz oil company, KNG, in the town. A hospital complex has been established adjacent to the Kyrgyz boarding school.

== Population ==
Historical population
Year	Pop.	±% p.a.
1970	11,825	—
1979	12,460	+0.58%
1989	16,149	+2.63%
1999	16,104	−0.03%
2009	14,814	−0.83%
2021	17,476	+1.39%
Note: resident population; Sources:

== Notable people ==
- Kockar Ata, Muslim saint buried in the city
- Nikolai Bulgakov, professional football coach and a former player
- Mirlan Murzaev, professional football player
