= Kyrgyz Higher League =

- Organising body: Kyrgyz Professional Football League (KPFL)
- Founded: 1992; 34 years ago
- Country: Kyrgyzstan
- Confederation: AFC
- Number of clubs: 16
- Level on pyramid: 1
- Relegation to: Kyrgyz First League
- Domestic cup(s): Kyrgyzstan Cup; Kyrgyzstan Super Cup
- International cup: AFC Challenge League
- Current champions: Bars Issyk-Kul (1st title) (2025)
- Most championships: Dordoi Bishkek (13 titles)
- Top scorer: Almazbek Mirzaliev (142 goals)
- Broadcaster(s): Kyrgyz Sport TV
- Current: 2026 Kyrgyz Premier League

The Kyrgyz Higher League (previously the Kyrgyz Premier League prior to 2026) is the top division of professional football in Kyrgyzstan. It was created in 1992 after the dissolution of the Soviet Union. The league is composed of eight teams. The most successful team is Dordoi Bishkek which has won the league thirteen times.

The winner of the league earns a spot in the AFC Challenge League, Asia's third club continental competition. The team with the worst record at the end of each season is demoted to the Kyrgyzstan League Second Level.

== Previous winners ==
=== Soviet-era champions ===
Champions were:

- 1934: Frunze City Team
- 1935: Dinamo Frunze
- 1936: Burevestnik Frunze
- 1937s: Spartak Frunze
- 1937f: Burevestnik Frunze
- 1938s: Dinamo Frunze
- 1938f: Dinamo Frunze
- 1939–44: not played
- 1945: Frunze City Team
- 1946: Spartak Frunze
- 1947: Spartak Frunze
- 1948: Spartak Frunze
- 1949: Burevestnik Frunze
- 1950: Spartak Frunze
- 1951: Frunze City Team
- 1952: Dinamo Frunze
- 1953: Osh Region Team
- 1954: Frunze City Team
- 1955: Frunze City Team
- 1956: Frunze City Team
- 1957: Frunze Region Team
- 1958: Torpedo Frunze
- 1959: Torpedo Frunze
- 1960: SKIF Frunze
- 1961: Mayli-Say City Team
- 1962: Alga Kalininskoye
- 1963: Alga Kalininskoye
- 1964: Selmashevets Frunze
- 1965: Alga Kalininskoye
- 1966: Selmashevets Frunze
- 1967: Alga Kalininskoye
- 1968: Selmashevets Frunze
- 1969: Instrumentalshchik Frunze
- 1970: Selmashevets Frunze
- 1971: Elektrik Frunze
- 1972: Selmashevets Frunze
- 1973: Selmashevets Frunze
- 1974: Tekstilshchik Osh
- 1975: Instrumentalshchik Frunze
- 1976: Stroitel Jalal-Abad
- 1977: Selmashevets Frunze
- 1978: Instrumentalshchik Frunze
- 1979: Selmashevets Frunze
- 1980: Instrumentalshchik Frunze
- 1981: Instrumentalshchik Frunze
- 1982: Instrumentalshchik Frunze
- 1983: Instrumentalshchik Frunze
- 1984: Instrumentalshchik Frunze
- 1985: not played
- 1986: Selmashevets Frunze
- 1987: Selmashevets Frunze
- 1988: Selmashevets Frunze
- 1989: Selmashevets Frunze
- 1990: Selmashevets Frunze
- 1991: Selmashevets Frunze

Club	Trophies	Years won
Rotor Bishkek	16	1958, 1959, 1964, 1966, 1968, 1970, 1972, 1973, 1977, 1979, 1986, 1987, 1988, 1989, 1990, 1991
Instrumentalshchik Bishkek	8	1969, 1975, 1978, 1980, 1981, 1982, 1983, 1984
Bishkek City Team	6	1934, 1945, 1951, 1954, 1955, 1956
Spartak Frunze	5	1937s, 1946, 1947, 1948, 1950
Dinamo MVD Bishkek	4	1935, 1938s, 1938f, 1952
Kyrgyzaltyn	4	1962, 1963, 1965, 1967
Burevestnik Frunze	3	1936, 1937f, 1949
Osh Region Team	1	1953
Bishkek Region Team	1	1957
SKIF Frunze	1	1960
Mayluu-Suu City Team	1	1961
Elektrik Frunze	1	1971
Tekstilshchik Osh	1	1974
Dzhalal-Abad	1	1976

=== Since independence ===
Champions since the country's independence were:

Year	Champion	Runner-up	Third Place	Top goalscorer	Player of the Year
1992	Alga Bishkek (1)	SKA Dostuk Sokuluk	Alay Osh	(Kyrgyzstan) Igor Sergeyev – SKA Dostuk Sokuluk (26)	
1993	Alga-RIIF Bishkek (2)	Spartak Tokmak	Alay Osh	(Kyrgyzstan) Davron Babayev – Dynamo Alay Osh (38)	
1994	Kant-Oil Kant (1)	Semetey Kyzyl-Kiya	Ak-Maral Tokmak	(Kyrgyzstan) Aleksandr Merzlikin – Kant-Oil Kant (25)	
1995	Kant-Oil Kant (2)	AiK Bishkek	Semetey Kyzyl-Kiya	(Kyrgyzstan) Aleksandr Merzlikin – Kant-Oil Kant (27)	
1996	Metallurg Kadamjay (1)	AiK Bishkek	Dinamo Alay Osh	(Kyrgyzstan) Aleksandr Merzlikin – AiK Bishkek (17)	
1997	Dinamo Bishkek (1)	Alga-PVO Bishkek	AiK Bishkek	(Kyrgyzstan) Farkhat Khaitbayev – KVT Dinamo Kara-Balta (17)	
1998	CAG-Dinamo-MVD Bishkek (2)	SKA-PVO Bishkek	National Guard Bishkek	(Kyrgyzstan) Sergey Gaizitdinov – Semetei Kyzyl-Kiya (23)	
1999	Dinamo Bishkek (3)	SKA-PVO Bishkek	Zhashtyk Ak Altyn Kara-Suu	(Kyrgyzstan) Ismail Malikov – Zhashtyk Ak Altyn Kara-Suu (16)	
2000	SKA-PVO Bishkek (3)	Dinamo Bishkek	Polyot Bishkek	(Kyrgyzstan) Valeriy Berezovskiy – SKA-PVO Bishkek (32)	
2001	SKA-PVO Bishkek (4)	Zhashtyk Ak Altyn Kara-Suu	Dordoy Naryn	(Kyrgyzstan) Nurlan Rajabaliyev – Zhashtyk-Ak-Altyn Kara-Suu (28)	
2002	SKA-PVO Bishkek (5)	Zhashtyk Ak Altyn Kara-Suu	Dordoi Naryn	(Kyrgyzstan) Yevgeny Boldygin – Zhashtyk Ak Altyn Kara-Suu (19)	
2003	Zhashtyk Ak Altyn Kara-Suu (1)	SKA-PVO Bishkek	Dordoy Naryn	(Kyrgyzstan) Roman Kornilov – SKA-PVO Bishkek (39)	
2004	Dordoi-Dynamo Naryn (1)	SKA-Shoro Bishkek	Zhashtyk Ak Altyn Kara-Suu	(Kyrgyzstan) Zamirbek Jumagulov – Dordoi-Dynamo Naryn (28)	
2005	Dordoi-Dynamo Naryn (2)	Shoro SKA Bishkek	Zhashtyk Ak Altyn Kara-Suu	(Kyrgyzstan) Yevgeny Boldygin – Zhashtyk Ak Altyn Kara-Suu (23)	
2006	Dordoi-Dynamo Naryn (3)	Abdish-Ata Kant	Zhashtyk Ak Altyn Kara-Suu	(Kyrgyzstan) Vyacheslav Pryanishnikov – Abdish-Ata Kant (24)	
2007	Dordoi-Dynamo Naryn (4)	Abdish-Ata Kant	Zhashtyk Ak Altyn Kara-Suu	(Kyrgyzstan) Almazbek Mirzaliev – Abdish-Ata Kant (21)	
2008	Dordoi-Dynamo Naryn (5)	Abdish-Ata Kant	Alay Osh	(Kyrgyzstan) Khurshit Lutfullayev – Abdysh-Ata Kant (Ghana) David Tetteh – Dordoi-Dynamo Naryn (13)	
2009	Dordoi-Dynamo (6)	Abdish-Ata Kant	Alay Osh	(Russia) Maxim Kretov – Dordoi-Dynamo Naryn (21)	(Ghana) Daniel Tagoe – Dordoi-Dynamo Naryn
2010	Neftchi Kochkor-Ata (1)	Dordoi-Dynamo	Abdish-Ata Kant	(Kyrgyzstan) Talaybek Djumatayev – Neftchi Kochkor-Ata (15)	(Kyrgyzstan) Azamat Baimatov – Dordoi Bishkek
2011	Dordoi Bishkek (7)	Neftchi Kochkor-Ata	Abdish-Ata Kant	(Kyrgyzstan) Vladimir Verevkin – Alga Bishkek (12)	
2012	Dordoi Bishkek (8)	Alga Bishkek	Alay Osh	(Kyrgyzstan) Kayumzhan Sharipov – Dordoi Bishkek (17)	
2013	Alay Osh (1)	Dordoi Bishkek	Abdish-Ata Kant	(Kyrgyzstan) Almazbek Mirzaliev (20) - Abdysh-Ata Kant	
2014	Dordoi Bishkek (9)	Abdish-Ata Kant	Alga Bishkek	(Pakistan) Kaleemullah Khan (18) - Dordoi Bishkek	(Pakistan) Kaleemullah Khan – Dordoi Bishkek
2015	Alay Osh (2)	Dordoi Bishkek	Abdish-Ata Kant	(Guinea) Alia Sylla (17) - Alay	
2016	Alay Osh (3)	Dordoi Bishkek	Alga Bishkek	(Guinea) Alia Sylla (21) - Alay	
2017	Alay Osh (4)	Abdysh-Ata Kant	Dordoi Bishkek	(Guinea) Alia Sylla (12) - Alay	
2018	Dordoi Bishkek (10)	Alay Osh	Abdysh-Ata Kant	(Ghana) Joel Kojo (26) - Alay	
2019	Dordoi Bishkek (11)	Alay Osh	Alga Bishkek	(Turkmenistan) Wahyt Orazsähedow (20) — Dordoi Bishkek	Gulzhigit Alykulov
2020	Dordoi Bishkek (12)	Alga Bishkek	Neftchi Kochkor-Ata	(Kyrgyzstan) Mirlan Murzaev (10) — Dordoi Bishkek	
2021	Dordoi Bishkek (13)	Abdysh-Ata Kant	Alga Bishkek	(Kyrgyzstan) Mirbek Akhmataliev (17) — Abdysh-Ata Kant	
2022	Abdysh-Ata Kant (1)	Alay Osh	Alga Bishkek	(Ghana) Emmanuel Yaghr (14) — FC Alay	(Kyrgyzstan) Magamed Uzdenov — FC Abdysh-Ata Kant
2023	Abdysh-Ata Kant (2)	Alay Osh	Dordoi Bishkek	(Montenegro) Danin Talović (14) — Dordoi Bishkek	
2024	Abdysh-Ata Kant (3)	Dordoi Bishkek	Muras United	(Kyrgyzstan) Atay Dzhumashev (11) — Abdysh-Ata Kant	
2025	Bars Issyk-Kul (1)	Muras United	Abdysh-Ata Kant	(Ukraine) Oleksiy Zinkevych (16) — Alay Osh	

== Performances ==
=== Performance by club ===
Club	Winners	Runners-up	Third Place	Winning years
Dordoi Bishkek	13	5	5	2004, 2005, 2006, 2007, 2008, 2009, 2011, 2012, 2014, 2018, 2019, 2020, 2021
Alga Bishkek	5	8	5	1992, 1993, 2000, 2001, 2002
Alay Osh	4	4	5	2013, 2015, 2016, 2017
Abdysh-Ata Kant	3	7	6	2022, 2023, 2024
Dinamo MVD Bishkek	3	1	–	1997, 1998, 1999
Kant-Oil	2	–	–	1994, 1995
Zhashtyk-Ak-Altyn Kara-Suu	1	2	5	2003
Neftchi Kochkor-Ata	1	1	1	2010
Metallurg Kadamjay	1	–	–	1996
Bars Issyk-Kul	1	–	–	2025
RUOR-Guardia Bishkek	–	2	2	
Ak-Maral Tokmok	–	1	1	
Muras United	–	1	1	
Shakhtyor Kyzyl-Kiya	–	1	1	
Orto-Nur Sokuluk	–	1	–	
Dinamo-UVD Osh	–	–	1	
Polyot Bishkek	–	–	1	

== League participation ==
As of 2026, 67 clubs have participated. Note: The tallies below include up to the 2026 season. Teams denoted in bold are current participants.

- **32** seasons: **Alga Bishkek**
- **28** seasons: **Alay**, **Dordoi Bishkek**
- **25** seasons: **Kyrgyzaltyn**
- **24** seasons: **Abdysh-Ata Kant**
- **22** seasons: **Neftchi Kochkor-Ata**
- **13** seasons: Zhashtyk-Ak-Altyn Kara-Suu
- **11** seasons: Dzhalal-Abad, Shakhtyor Kyzyl-Kiya
- **10** seasons: Dinamo MVD Bishkek
- **9** seasons: Dinamo-UVD Osh, **Ilbirs Bishkek**, RUOR-Guardia Bishkek
- **6** seasons: Ala-Too Naryn, Issyk-Kol Karakol, SKA-Alay Osh
- **5** seasons: Dinamo-Manas-SKIF Bishkek, Kaganat, Rotor Bishkek, Sher Bishkek
- **4** seasons: Ak-Maral Tokmok, Ak-Zhol, Kant-Oil, **Muras United**, Orto-Nur Sokuluk, **OshSU-Aldier**, **Talant**, **Uzgen**
- **3** seasons: Aldiyer Kurshab, Kant, KG United, Polyot Bishkek, Talas
- **2** seasons: Abdysh-Ata-99, Ala-Buka, **Asiagoal Bishkek**, **Bars**, **Bishkek City**, Dordoi-Plaza, Energetik Karaköl, Instrumentalshchik Bishkek, Shakhtyor Tashkömür, Shoro Bishkek, Team Kyrgyzstan U-21, Uchkun Kara-Suu
- **1** season: Ak-Bura Osh, Alamudun, Alga-2 Bishkek, **Asia Talas**, Ata-Spor Bishkek, Bakit Mailuu-Suu, Bazar-Korgon-Babur, Belovodskoye, Dinamo-Chuy UVD, Dinamo Kant, Ekolog Bishkek, Energetik Bishkek, Kelechek Osh, Kolos Nizhnechuyskoye, Lokomotiv Dzhalal-Abad, Metallurg Kadamjay, Muras-Sport Bishkek, Nookat, Nur-Batken, Olimpia-85 Bishkek, Team Kyrgyzstan U-17, **FC Toktogul**, Tsementnik Kant, Zhashtyk Osh
