= List of football clubs in Kyrgyzstan =

The following is a list of football clubs in Kyrgyzstan. The clubs mentioned below are currently competing in the top divisions of the Kyrgyz football league system.

== Kyrgyzstan League ==
- FC Abdish-Ata Kant
- FC Abdish-Ata-91 previously Abdish-Ata-FShM Kant
- FC Ak-Bura Osh
- FC Ak-Maral Tokmok previously Spartak Tokmok
- FC Ak-Zhol previously Al-Fagir Aravan, Dinamo Aravan, Sharab-K Aravan, Ak-Bula Aravan, Druzhba Aravan, Yangiyul Aravan
- FC Ala-Too Naryn
- FC Alamudun previously Luch Altyn-Taala Alamudun, Dinamo Alamudun
- FC Alay previously Alay-Osh-Pirim, Shakhtyor Osh
- FC Aldiyer Kurshab
- FC Alga Bishkek previously Aviator-AAL Bishkek, SKA-Shoro Bishkek, SKA-PVO Bishkek, Alga-PVO Bishkek, Alga-RIIF Bishkek, Alga Frunze, Spartak Frunze, Iskra Frunze, Trudovye Rezervy Frunze, Zenit Frunze
- FC Alga-2 Bishkek previously Alga Bishkek, Alga-d Frunze
- FC Ata-Spor Bishkek
- FC Bazar-Korgon-Babur
- FC Dinamo Ala-Buka
- FC Dinamo Kant
- FC Dinamo-Manas-SKIF Bishkek previously Shumkar-Dastan Bishkek, Shumkar Bishkek, Shumkar-SKIF Bishkek
- FC Dinamo-Polyot Bishkek previously Dinamo-Erkin Farm Bishkek, Erkin Farm Bishkek, CAG-Dinamo-MVD Bishkek, Dinamo-Oil Bishkek, Dinamo Frunze
- FC Dinamo-UVD Osh previously Dinamo-Alay Osh, Dinamo Osh
- FC Dordoi Bishkek previously Dordoi-Dynamo Naryn, Dordoi-Zhashtyk-SKIF Naryn, Dordoi Naryn
- FC Dordoi-Plaza
- FC Dostuk Uzgen previously Kara-Shoro Uzgen
- FC Dzhalal-Abad previously Asyl Jalal-Abad, Kambar-Ata Jalal-Abad, Doma Ata Jalal-Abad, Dinamo-KPK Jalal-Abad, Dinamo Jalal-Abad, Kokart Jalal-Abad, Khimik Jalal-Abad, Stroitel Jalal-Abad
- FC Ekolog Bishkek
- FC Energetik Karaköl
- FC Instrumentalshchik Bishkek previously Instrumentalshchik Frunze
- FC Issyk-Kol Karakol previously FC Kol-Tor Karakol, FC Karakol
- FC Kant previously Kant-77
- FC Kant-Oil previously Han-Tengri Kant
- FC Kelechek Osh
- FC Khimik Kara-Balta previously Jayil-Baatyr Kara-Balta, Bakay Kara-Balta, KVT Dinamo Kara-Balta, KVT Khimik Kara-Balta
- FC Khimik Suzak
- FC Lokomotiv Jalal-Abad
- FC Manas-Ordo Talas previously Manas-Dinamo Talas, Boo-Terek Talas, Manas Talas, Dinamo-Manas Talas, Namys-APK Talas
- FC Metallurg Kadamjay
- FC Muras-Sport Bishkek
- FC Neftchi Kochkor-Ata previously Neftchi-KPK Kochkor-Ata, Neftchi-KRS Kochkor-Ata
- FC Nookat
- FC Olimpia-85 Bishkek
- FC Orto-Nur Sokuluk previously Frunze Sokuluk, Dinamo Sokuluk, SKA-Dostuk Sokuluk, Dostuk Sokuluk
- FC Pivo Belovodskoye previously Maksat Belovodskoye
- FC Polyot Bishkek previously SC Sverdlovskogo RUVD Bishkek
- FC Rotor Bishkek merger of FC Instrumentalshchik Bishkek and Selmashevets (Torpedo Frunze).
- FC RUOR-Guardia Bishkek previously SKNG Bishkek, National Guard Bishkek, National Guard-AiK Bishkek, AiK Bishkek
- FC Shakhtyor Kyzyl-Kiya previously FC Kyzyl-Kiya, Semetey-Dinamo Kyzyl-Kiya, Semetey Kyzyl-Kiya
- FC Shakhtyor Tashkömür
- FC Sher-Ak-Dan Bishkek previously Sher Bishkek
- FC Shoro Bishkek
- FC SKA-Alay Osh previously Alay-Oshpirim Gulcha, Alay Gulcha
- FC Svetotekhnika Mayli-Su
- Team Kyrgyzstan U-17
- Team Kyrgyzstan U-21
- FC Uchkun Kara-Suu
- FC Zhashtyk-Ak-Altyn Kara-Suu previously Zhashtyk Osh, Ak-Altyn Kara-Suu, Aka-Atyn Kara-Suu

== Kyrgyzstan League Second Level ==
- FC Nashe Pivo previously Abdish-Ata-2 Kant
