= 1992 Kyrgyzstan League =

Kyrgyzstan League
- Season: 1992
- Champions: Alga Bishkek
- Matches played: 132
- Goals scored: 457 (3.46 per match)
- Top goalscorer: Igor Sergeyev

The 1992 Kyrgyzstan League was the 1st season of Kyrgyzstan League, after independence from the Soviet Union, the Football Federation of Kyrgyz Republic's top division of association football. Alga Bishkek were the inaugural champions. Twelve teams participated in the inaugural season.

After the season, Ala Too Naryn, who finished in 12th place and Namys APK Talas, who finished in 9th place, were removed from the league. They were replaced by Ysy Kol Karakol, Shumkar SKIF Bishkek, Han Tengri Kant, Shakhtyor Task Kumyr, Maksat Belovodskoye, and Uchkun Kara Suu. The leading goal scorer for the season was Igor Sergeyev. He scored 26 goals for SKA Dostuk Sokuluk.

== League standings ==
Pos	Team	Pld	W	D	L	GF	GA	GD	Pts
1	Alga Bishkek	22	18	2	2	70	16	+54	38
2	SKA Dostuk Sokuluk	22	13	6	3	63	17	+46	32
3	Alay Osh	22	12	3	7	55	24	+31	27
4	Selmashevets Bishkek	22	11	4	7	34	31	+3	26
5	Semetei Kyzyl Kiya	22	10	4	8	40	36	+4	24
6	Alai Gulcha	22	10	4	8	28	35	−7	24
7	Spartak Tokmak	22	9	6	7	39	23	+16	24
8	Instrumentalschik Bishkek	22	8	6	8	31	33	−2	22
9	Namys APK Talas	22	6	4	12	38	46	−8	16
10	KVT Khimik Kara Balta	22	5	3	14	21	48	−27	13
11	Kokart Dzhalalabad	22	4	2	16	26	70	−44	10
12	Ala Too Naryn	22	2	4	16	12	78	−66	8

Source: rsssf.org

== Top scorers ==
Pos	Player	Club	Goals
1	Igor Sergeyev	SKA Dostuk Sokuluk	26
2	Shavkat Abdurakhmanov	Semetei Kyzyl Kiya	20
3	Usmanhodja Yurjev	Alay Osh	17
3	Tashtan Kainazarov	Namys APK Talas	17
