= 1993 Kyrgyzstan League =

Kyrgyzstan League
- Season: 1993
- Champions: Alga RIIF Bishkek
- Matches: 272

The 1993 Kyrgyzstan League is the 2nd season of Kyrgyzstan League, the Football Federation of Kyrgyz Republic's top division of association football. Alga RIIF Bishkek won the league in which seventeen teams participated in.

== League standings ==
Pos	Team	Pld	W	D	L	GF	GA	GD	Pts
1	Alga RIIF Bishkek	32	29	3	0	129	14	+115	61
2	Spartak Tokmak	32	26	3	3	93	17	+76	55
3	Alay Osh	32	25	3	4	110	49	+61	53
4	SKA Dostuk Sokuluk	32	18	7	7	67	39	+28	43
5	Alga Bishkek	32	17	7	8	56	37	+19	41
6	KVT Khimik Kara Balta	32	17	4	11	61	57	+4	38
7	Semetei Kyzyl Kiya	32	15	6	11	61	45	+16	36
8	Selmashevets Bishkek	32	13	7	12	54	59	−5	33
9	Ysyk Kol Karakol	32	11	5	16	56	66	−10	27
10	Shumkar SKIF Bishkek	32	11	4	17	46	57	−11	26
11	Instrumentalschik Bishkek	32	11	0	21	46	70	−24	22
12	Alai Gulchu	32	9	3	20	40	80	−40	21
13	Kokart Dzhalalabad	32	8	3	21	37	85	−48	19
14	Han Tengri Kant	32	7	5	20	39	72	−33	19
15	Shakhtyor Task Kumyr	32	7	5	20	45	101	−56	19
16	Maksat Belovodskoye	32	6	7	19	32	66	−34	19
17	Uchkun Kara Suu	32	4	4	24	37	95	−58	12

Source: rsssf.org

== Promotion/relegation play-off ==
Maksat Belovodskoye who finished in sixteenth place, played off against Northern Zone champions of Division two Dzhashtyk Ysyk Ata.
Uchkun Kara Suu who finished in seventeenth place, played off against Southern Zone champions of Division two Aka Atyn Kara Suu.
There weren't any promotions to the top division or relegations to the lower division.
Aka Atyn Kara Suu did partake in the 1994 season due to withdrawals prior to that season.

=== Match 1 ===
Maksat Belovodskoye	5–0	Dzhashtyk Ysyk Ata

=== Match 2 ===
Uchkun Kara Suu	2–1	Aka Atyn Kara Suu
