= 1995 Kyrgyzstan League =

Kyrgyzstan League
- Season: 1995
- Champions: Kant Oil Kant

The 1995 Kyrgyzstan League is the 4th season of Kyrgyzstan League, the Football Federation of Kyrgyz Republic's top division of association football. Kant Oil Kant retained the league that they won in the previous season. Sixteen teams participated in the 1995 season.

The league was divided in two zones of eight teams, Zone A and Zone B, with the top four teams in each zone qualifying for the championship playoffs. The bottom four teams in each zone entered the promotion/relegation playoff. There they were joined by eight teams from the lower division. This was divided into a northern and southern zone. The northern zone was played, but not the southern zone.

From this northern zone promotion/relegation play-off, three teams were promoted to the top level division for the 1996 season: Rotor Bishkek, Dinamo Bishkek and KVT Khimik Kara Balta.

== First stage ==
=== Zone A ===
Pos	Team	Pld	W	D	L	GF	GA	GD	Pts
1	Kant Oli Kant	14	12	2	0	52	9	+43	38
2	Alga Bishkek	14	8	4	2	32	19	+13	28
3	Shumkar Bishkek	14	6	3	5	15	17	−2	21
4	AiK Issyk Ata	14	6	3	5	18	11	+7	21
5	Ak Maral Tokmak	14	3	7	4	17	18	−1	16
6	Rotor Bishkek	14	4	1	9	15	27	−12	13
7	KVT Khimik Kara Balta	14	2	3	9	13	38	−25	9
8	Dinamo Bishkek	14	2	3	9	10	33	−23	9

Source: rsssf.com

=== Zone B ===
Pos	Team	Pld	W	D	L	GF	GA	GD	Pts
1	Alai Osh	14	10	1	3	28	7	+21	31
2	Alai Gulcha	14	9	1	4	17	12	+5	28
3	Semetei Kyzyl Kiya	14	8	4	2	33	17	+16	28
4	Dinamo Osh	14	8	3	3	31	14	+17	27
5	Ak Altyn Kara Suu	14	7	1	6	21	19	+2	22
6	Neftchi Kochkor Ata	14	4	3	7	12	23	−11	15
7	Kokart Dzhalal Abad	14	3	1	10	17	39	−22	10
8	Khimik Suzak	14	0	0	14	5	33	−28	0

Source: rsssf.com

== Second stage ==
=== Championship play Off ===
Pos	Team	Pld	W	D	L	GF	GA	GD	Pts
1	Kant Oil Kant	14	9	4	1	25	7	+18	31
2	AiK Bishkek	14	9	3	2	24	7	+17	30
3	Semetei Kyzyl Kiya	14	8	4	2	23	8	+15	28
4	Dinamo Osh	14	5	2	7	19	28	−9	17
5	Alga Bishkek	14	4	5	5	19	16	+3	17
6	Alai Osh	14	3	7	4	19	25	−6	16
7	Alai Gulcha	14	1	4	9	11	33	−22	7
8	Shumkar Bishkek	14	1	3	10	4	20	−16	6

Source: rsssf.com

=== Promotion/relegation play Off: Northern Zone ===
Pos	Team	Pld	W	D	L	GF	GA	GD	Pts
1	Rotor Bishkek	14	12	1	1	38	8	+30	37
2	Dinamo Bishkek	14	9	2	3	37	17	+20	29
3	KVT Khimik Kara Balta	14	9	1	4	37	13	+24	28
4	Energetik Bishkek	14	5	3	6	18	26	−8	18
5	Tsementnik Kant	14	5	3	6	18	27	−9	18
6	Ak Maral Tokmak	14	4	3	7	19	24	−5	15
7	Dinamo-Chuy UVD	14	4	2	8	14	28	−14	14
8	Kolos Nizhnechuisk	14	0	1	13	10	47	−37	1

Source: rsssf.com
