= Vladimir Salo =

Kyrgyzstani footballer

Personal information
- Full name: Vladimir Salo
- Date of birth: 6 February 1974 (age 52)
- Place of birth: Belovodskoye, Kirghiz SSR, Soviet Union
- Position: Defender

Senior career*
Years	Team	Apps	(Gls)
1991–1993	SKA-Dostuk Sokuluk	52	(2)
1994–1995	Kant-Oil	47	(3)
1996–1997	Volgar-Gazprom	20	(0)
1997	Dinamo Bishkek	8	(3)
1997	Alga-PVO Bishkek	8	(0)
1998–1999	SKA-PVO Bishkek	27	(13)
2000	Shakhter Karagandy	9	(0)
2000	SKA-PVO Bishkek	22	(5)
2001–2002	Zhetysu	53	(2)
2003	Taraz	15	(2)
2003	SKA-PVO Bishkek	9	(0)
2004–2005	SKA-Shoro Bishkek		
2006	Abdysh-Ata Kant		
2007	Aviator AAL Bishkek		

International career
1994–2004	Kyrgyzstan	30	(0)

Managerial career
- 2024–2026: Dordoi Bishkek
- * Club domestic league appearances and goals

Vladimir Salo (born 6 February 1974) is a retired Kyrgyzstani international football player who played for the Kyrgyzstan national football team, most recently head coach of Dordoi Bishkek.

== Managerial career ==
On 16 June 2024, Kyrgyz Premier League club Dordoi Bishkek announced the appointment of Salo as their new head coach on a contract until the end of the season.

On 11 December 2025, Dordoi Bishkek announced that they had extended their contract with Salo for the 2026 season. On 9 June 2026, Dordoi Bishkek announced that Salo had left the club.

== Career statistics ==
=== International ===
Kyrgyzstan national team
Year	Apps	Goals
1994	2	0
1995	0	0
1996	0	0
1997	4	0
1998	0	0
1999	3	0
2000	4	0
2001	7	0
2002	0	0
2003	2	0
2004	8	0
Total	30	0

Statistics accurate as of match played 17 November 2004

== Honors ==
Kant-Oil

- Kyrgyzstan League (2): 1994, 1995

Dinamo Bishkek

- Kyrgyzstan League (1): 1997

Alga-PVO Bishkek

- Kyrgyzstan Cup (1): 1997

SKA-PVO Bishkek

- Kyrgyzstan League (1): 2000
- Kyrgyzstan Cup (4): 1998, 1999, 2000, 2003
