= 1994 Kyrgyzstan League =

Kyrgyzstan League
- Season: 1994
- Champions: Kant Oil Kant
- Matches: 182

The 1994 Kyrgyzstan League is the 3rd season of Kyrgyzstan League, the Football Federation of Kyrgyz Republic's top division of association football. Kant Oil Kant won the league in which fourteen teams participated.

== League standings ==
Pos	Team	Pld	W	D	L	GF	GA	GD	Pts
1	Kant Oil Kant	26	22	3	1	85	16	+69	47
2	Semetei Kyzyl Kiya	26	19	6	1	80	16	+64	44
3	Ak Maral Tokmak	26	20	3	3	51	12	+39	43
4	Alga Bishkek	26	19	2	5	66	21	+45	40
5	Shumkar SKIF Bishkek	26	16	3	7	44	19	+25	35
6	Alai Osh	26	12	7	7	46	28	+18	31
7	Alai Oshpirim Gulcha	26	10	4	12	30	43	−13	24
8	KVT Khimik Kara Balta	26	9	4	13	34	31	+3	22
9	Rotor Bishkek	26	7	6	13	23	41	−18	20
10	Ak Altyn Kara Suu	26	9	1	16	32	63	−31	19
11	Neftchi Kochkor Ata	26	3	5	18	17	84	−67	11
12	Uchkun Kara Suu	26	3	4	19	10	38	−28	10
13	Shakhtyor Tash Kumyr	26	3	3	20	10	88	−78	9
14	Kokart Dzhalalabad	26	2	3	21	15	43	−28	7

Source: rsssf.com 1994 Kyrgyzstan League

== Notes ==
Many games, especially against Kokart Dzhalalabad and Uchkun Kara Suu, were awarded, two were apparently awarded against both teams.
This causes the irregularities in the win/loss and goals for/goals against columns.

== Withdrawn Teams ==
SKA Dostuk Sokuluk, finished in 4th place, Ysyk Kol Karakol, finished in 9th place and Maksat Belovodskoye, finished in 16th place all withdrew before the 1994 season.
