= Football in Kyrgyzstan =

- Country: Kyrgyzstan
- Governing body: Football Federation of the Kyrgyz Republic
- National teams: Men's national team Women's national team National futsal team

National competitions
- Kyrgyzstan Cup; Kyrgyzstan Super Cup

Club competitions
- Kyrgyz Higher League; Kyrgyz First League; Kyrgyz Regional League; Kyrgyzstan Women's Championship

International competitions
- AFC Cup; AFC Champions League; FIFA World Cup; Asian Cup

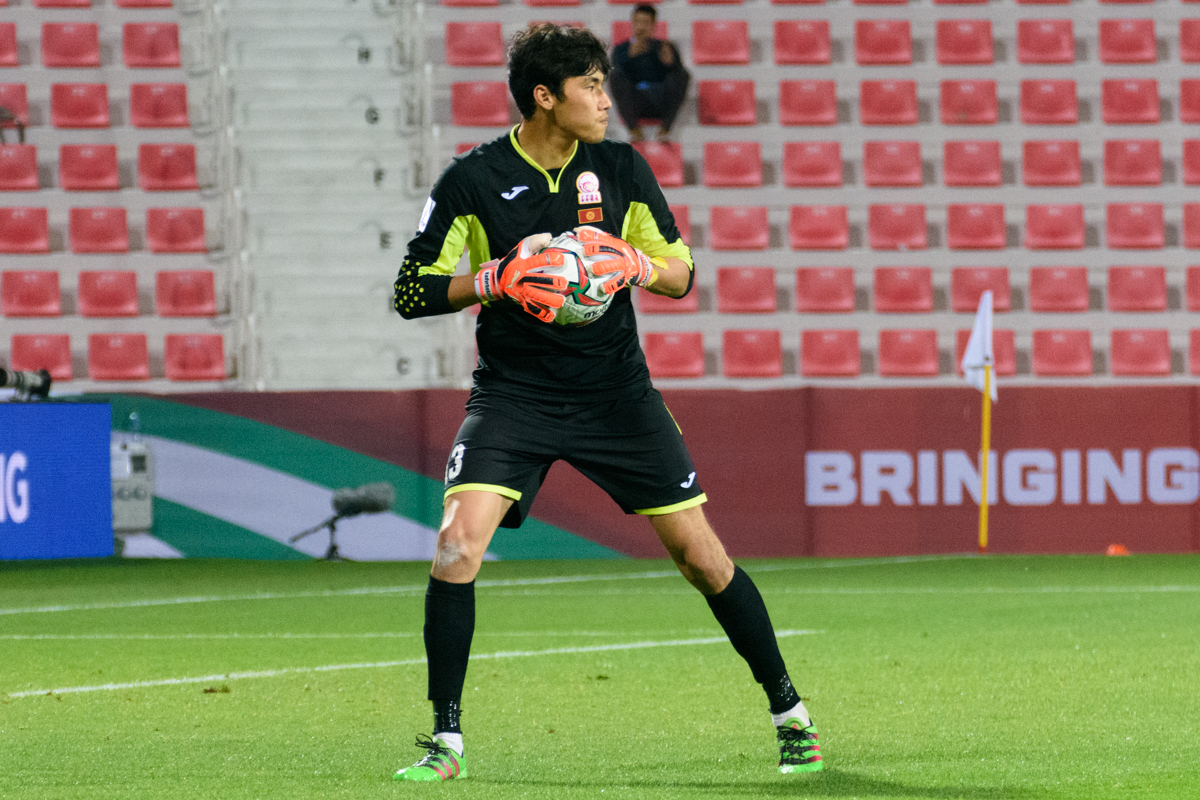
Kutman Kadyrbekov playing for the Kyrgyzstan national football team.

The sport of football in the country of Kyrgyzstan is run by the Football Federation of Kyrgyz Republic. The association administers the national football team as well as the Kyrgyzstan League. Football is the most popular sport in the country.

== National team ==
Kyrgyzstan is a moderate level Asian football nation, having qualified for the last 3 Asian Cups.

Kyrgyzstan qualified for the Asian Cup in 2019 for the first time in their history. The team subsequently qualified for the next two iterations of the tournament in 2023 and 2027.

== Football stadiums in Kyrgyzstan by capacity ==
Stadium	Location	Capacity	Tenants	Image
Bishkek Arena	Bishkek	51,000	Kyrgyzstan national football team	
Dolen Omurzakov Stadium	Bishkek	23,000		

== Most successful clubs overall ==
As of 19 August 2026

local and lower league organizations are not included.

Club	Domestic Titles				Worldwide Titles	Overall titles
Club	Kyrgyz Premier League	Kyrgyzstan Cup	Kyrgyzstan Super Cup	Total	AFC Challenge League	Overall titles
Dordoi Bishkek	**13**	**11**	**6**	**30**	**2**	**32**
Alga Bishkek	5	9	-	14	-	14
Abdysh-Ata	3	5	3	11	-	11
Alay	4	2	3	9	-	9
Neftchi Kochkor-Ata	1	2	1	4	-	4
Dinamo MVD Bishkek	3	-	-	3	-	3
Kant-Oil	2	-	-	2	-	2
Bars	1	-	1	2	-	2
Muras United	-	2	-	2	-	2
Metallurg Kadamjay	1	-	-	1	-	1
Zhashtyk-Ak-Altyn Kara-Suu	1	-	-	1	-	1
Ak-Maral Tokmok	-	1	-	1	-	1
RUOR-Guardia Bishkek	-	1	-	1	-	1
Shakhtyor Kyzyl-Kiya	-	1	-	1	-	1

- The articles in italic indicate the defunct leagues and the defunct cups.
- The figures in **bold** indicate the most times this competition has been won by a team.

== Attendances ==
The average attendance per top-flight football league season and the club with the highest average attendance:

Season	League average	Best club	Best club average
2023	516	FC Alay	1,244

Source: League page on Wikipedia

== See also ==
- Lists of stadiums
