= 2003 Kyrgyzstan League =

Kyrgyzstan League
- Season: 2003
- Champions: SKA PVO Bishkek

Statistics of Kyrgyzstan League for the 2003 season.

== Overview ==
It was contested by 18 teams, and Zhashtyk Ak Altyn Kara-Suu won the championship.

== First stage ==
=== Zone A ===
Pos	Team	Pld	W	D	L	GF	GA	GD	Pts
1	SKA PVO Bishkek	20	18	1	1	99	9	+90	55
2	Dordoy Naryn	20	18	1	1	85	8	+77	55
3	RUOR Guardia Bishkek	20	10	3	7	34	32	+2	33
4	Shoro Bishkek	20	10	2	8	36	27	+9	32
5	Kol Tor Karakol	20	10	2	8	39	40	−1	32
6	Jayil Baatyr Kara Balta	20	8	4	8	33	51	−18	28
7	Abdish-Ata Kant	20	8	3	9	41	46	−5	27
8	Orto Nur Sokuluk	20	5	3	12	27	53	−26	18
9	Olimpia 85 Bishkek	20	5	1	14	24	61	−37	16
10	Dinamo Polyot Bishkek	20	4	3	13	21	50	−29	15
11	Manas Ordo Talas	20	2	1	17	17	79	−62	7

Source: rsssf.com

=== Zone B ===
Pos	Team	Pld	W	D	L	GF	GA	GD	Pts
1	Zhashtyk Ak Altyn Kara-Suu	12	11	0	1	65	7	+58	33
2	Dinamo UVD Osh	12	10	1	1	51	15	+36	31
3	Alay Osh	12	8	0	4	20	20	0	24
4	Ak Bula Aravan	12	4	2	6	16	28	−12	14
5	Neftchi KPK Kochkor Ata	12	3	1	8	13	41	−28	10
6	Kelechek Osh	12	2	2	8	18	37	−19	8
7	Kara Shoro Ozgon	12	1	0	11	15	50	−35	3

Source: rsssf.com

== League standings ==
Pos	Team	Pld	W	D	L	GF	GA	GD	Pts
1	Zhashtyk Ak Altyn Kara-Suu	14	11	3	0	45	7	+38	36
2	SKA PVO Bishkek	14	10	1	3	27	10	+17	31
3	Dordoy Naryn	14	9	2	3	35	10	+25	29
4	Shoro Bishkek	14	7	2	5	31	20	+11	23
5	RUOR Guardia Bishkek	14	6	1	7	24	27	−3	19
6	Dinamo UVD Osh	14	2	4	8	14	27	−13	10
7	Alay Osh	14	3	0	11	17	47	−30	9
8	Ak Bula Aravan	14	1	1	12	12	57	−45	4

Source: rsssf.com
