= Sergey Kutsov =

Kyrgyzstani footballer

Sergei Kutsov
Personal information
- Date of birth: 23 April 1977 (age 49)
- Place of birth: Kyrgyz SSR, Soviet Union
- Height: 1.92 m (6 ft 4 in)
- Position: Defender

Senior career*
Years	Team	Apps	(Gls)
1993–1995	Alga Bishkek	79	(35)
1996–1997	Alga-PVO Bishkek	36	(27)
1998–1999	SKA-PVO Bishkek	?	(?)
1999–2004	FC Kairat Almaty	111	(17)
2005	Temirzholshy Almaty	3	(0)
2007–2008	Zhetysu	29	(5)
2009	Kaisar	9	(0)
2009	Vostok	0	(0)
2010	Kairat	23	(1)
2011–2013	Atyrau	54	(1)
2014–2015	Spartak Semey	45	(2)

International career^{‡}
1996–2001	Kyrgyzstan	16	(3)
- * Club domestic league appearances and goals as of 4 February 2019 ‡ National team caps and goals as of 24 December 2007

Sergei Kutsov (born 23 April 1977) is a retired Kyrgyzstani footballer.

In March 2014 Kutsov signed for newly promoted Kazakhstan Premier League side Spartak Semey.

He was a member of the Kyrgyzstan national football team between 1996 and 2001.

== Club career stats ==
As of 19 November 2014

Club performance			League		Cup		Continental		Total	
Season	Club	League	Apps	Goals	Apps	Goals	Apps	Goals	Apps	Goals
1993	Alga Bishkek	Kyrgyzstan League	31	4			-		31	4
1994	Alga Bishkek	Kyrgyzstan League	21	14			-		21	14
1995	Alga Bishkek	Kyrgyzstan League	27	7			-		27	7
1996	Alga-PVO Bishkek	Kyrgyzstan League	20	13			-		20	13
1997	Alga-PVO Bishkek	Kyrgyzstan League	16	14			-		16	14
1998	SKA-PVO Bishkek	Kyrgyzstan League	27	15			-		27	15
1999	SKA-PVO Bishkek	Kyrgyzstan League	?	8			-		?	8
1999	Kairat	Kazakhstan Premier League	11	5			-		11	5
2000	Kairat	Kazakhstan Premier League	25	7			-		25	7
2001	Kairat	Kazakhstan Premier League	20	2					20	2
2002	Kairat	Kazakhstan Premier League	25	2			2	0	27	2
2003	Kairat	Kazakhstan Premier League	25	1			-		25	1
2004	Kairat	Kazakhstan Premier League	5	0			-		5	0
2005	Temirjolshy Almaty	Kazakhstan First Division	3	0			-		3	0
2006	No Club		-		-		-		0	0
2007	Zhetysu	Kazakhstan Premier League	10	3			-		10	3
2008	Zhetysu	Kazakhstan Premier League	19	2			-		19	2
2009	Kaisar	Kazakhstan Premier League	9	0			-		9	0
2009	Vostok	Kazakhstan Premier League	0	0			-		0	0
2010	Kairat	Kazakhstan Premier League	23	1			-		23	1
2011	Atyrau	Kazakhstan Premier League	17	0	1	0	-		18	0
2012	Atyrau	Kazakhstan Premier League	18	0			-		18	0
2013	Atyrau	Kazakhstan Premier League	19	0			-		19	0
2014	Spartak Semey	Kazakhstan Premier League	23	1	0	0	-		23	1
Total	Kyrgyzstan			75			-			75
Total	Kazakhstan		252	24			2	0	254	24
Career total			394	99			2	0	396	99

== Achievements ==
Kyrgyzstan Cup

- 1997 :Alga-PVO Bishkek
- 1998 :SKA-PVO Bishkek

Kazakhstan Premier League

- 2004 :FC Kairat

Kazakhstan Cup

- 1999–2000 :FC Kairat
- 2001 :FC Kairat
- 2003 :FC Kairat
