= Vladislav Chernyshov =

Kazakh-Kyrgyz footballer

Personal information
- Date of birth: 16 March 1981 (age 45)
- Place of birth: Bishkek, Kyrgyz SSR, Soviet Union
- Height: 1.86 m (6 ft 1 in)
- Position: Defender

Senior career*
Years	Team	Apps	(Gls)
1998–2001	Dinamo Bishkek	58	(8)
2001–2002	Alga Bishkek	27	(5)
2003–2015	Irtysh	262	(19)
2017	Irtysh	0	(0)

International career
2011	Kazakhstan	2	(0)
- * Club domestic league appearances and goals as of 22 March 2016

Vladislav Chernyshov (born 16 March 1981) is a Kazakh-Kyrgyz footballer who last played for Kazakhstan Premier League club FC Irtysh Pavlodar as a defender. He played for the Kyrgyzstan olympic football team until 2002. In October 2010 he was called up to Kazakhstan national football team for the first time.

He appeared twice for the Kazakhstan national team in 2011.

== Career statistics ==
As of match played 9 November 2015

Appearances and goals by club, season and competition
Club	Season	League			National Cup		Continental		Other		Total	
Club	Season	Division	Apps	Goals	Apps	Goals	Apps	Goals	Apps	Goals	Apps	Goals
CAG-Dinamo-MVD Bishkek	1998	Kyrgyzstan League	8	2			-		-		8	2
CAG-Dinamo-MVD Bishkek	1999	Kyrgyzstan League	14	2			-		-		14	2
CAG-Dinamo-MVD Bishkek	2000	Kyrgyzstan League	22	0			-		-		22	0
CAG-Dinamo-MVD Bishkek	2001	Kyrgyzstan League	14	4			-		-		14	4
CAG-Dinamo-MVD Bishkek	Total		58	8			-	-	-	-	58	9
Alga Bishkek	2001	Kyrgyzstan League	9	0			-		-		9	0
Alga Bishkek	2002	Kyrgyzstan League	18	5			-		-		18	5
Alga Bishkek	Total		27	5			-	-	-	-	27	5
Irtysh Pavlodar	2003	Kazakhstan Premier League	9	0	3	1	0	0	-		9	0
Irtysh Pavlodar	2004	Kazakhstan Premier League	9	0	0	0	-		-		9	0
Irtysh Pavlodar	2005	Kazakhstan Premier League	26	1	2	1	-		-		26	1
Irtysh Pavlodar	2006	Kazakhstan Premier League	20	2	6	0	-		-		20	2
Irtysh Pavlodar	2007	Kazakhstan Premier League	13	1	2	1	-		-		13	1
Irtysh Pavlodar	2008	Kazakhstan Premier League	21	4	1	0	-		-		21	4
Irtysh Pavlodar	2009	Kazakhstan Premier League	22	3	5	0	2	0	-		22	3
Irtysh Pavlodar	2010	Kazakhstan Premier League	29	2	0	0	-		-		29	2
Irtysh Pavlodar	2011	Kazakhstan Premier League	24	1	4	0	3	0	-		24	1
Irtysh Pavlodar	2012	Kazakhstan Premier League	18	0	7	0	-		-		18	0
Irtysh Pavlodar	2013	Kazakhstan Premier League	21	3	2	0	3	0	-		21	3
Irtysh Pavlodar	2014	Kazakhstan Premier League	24	1	1	0	-		-		24	1
Irtysh Pavlodar	2015	Kazakhstan Premier League	26	1	1	0	-		-		18	1
Irtysh Pavlodar	Total		262	19	34	3	8	0	-	-	304	22
Career total			347	32			8	0	-	-	389	35

== Honours ==
Dinamo-Polyot Bishkek

- Kyrgyzstan League (2): 1998, 1999

Alga Bishkek

- Kyrgyzstan League (2): 2001, 2002
- Kyrgyzstan Cup (1): 2002

Irtysh Pavlodar

- Kazakhstan Premier League (1): 2003
