= Nazim Ajiev =

Kyrgyzstani footballer

Personal information
- Full name: Nazim Dadaevich Ajiev
- Date of birth: 7 July 1967 (age 59)
- Place of birth: Frunze, Kyrgyz SSR
- Height: 1.78 m (5 ft 10 in)
- Positions: Forward; midfielder

Senior career*
Years	Team	Apps	(Gls)
1986	FC Meliorator Kzyl-Orda	6	(0)
1987–1989	FC Selmashevets Frunze		
1990	FC Dostuk Sokuluk	31	(1)
1991	FC Neftyanik Fergana	1	(0)
1991	FC Gazovik Orenburg	30	(0)
1992	FC Pirin Blagoevgrad	7	(0)
1993–1994	FC Ak-Maral Tokmok	29	(6)
1994	FC Shakhter Karagandy	4	(0)
1995	FC Ak-Maral Tokmok	10	(2)
1995	FC Lokomotiv Nizhny Novgorod	1	(0)
1996–1997	FC Gazovik Orenburg	51	(2)
1998–1999	National Guard Bishkek	33	(2)
2000	FC Ekolog Bishkek	20	(12)
2001	Bakay Kara Balta	12	(4)
2002	FC SKA-PVO Bishkek	18	(4)

International career
2003	Kyrgyzstan	2	(0)
- * Club domestic league appearances and goals

Nazim Dadaevich Ajiev (Russian: Назим Дадаевич Аджиев; born 7 July 1967 in Frunze) is a former Kyrgyzstani football player.

== Honours ==
SKA-PVO Bishkek

- Kyrgyzstan League champion: 2002
