= 2000 Kyrgyzstan League =

Kyrgyzstan League
- Season: 2000
- Champions: SKA PVO Bishkek

Statistics of Kyrgyzstan League for the 2000 season.

== Overview ==
The football season of 2000 consisted of 12 competing teams, resulting in SKA PVO Bishkek winning the championship.

== League standings ==
Pos	Team	Pld	W	D	L	GF	GA	GD	Pts
1	SKA PVO Bishkek	22	21	1	0	98	8	+90	64
2	Dinamo Bishkek	22	16	4	2	65	16	+49	52
3	Polyot Bishkek	22	16	0	6	53	23	+30	48
4	Zhashtyk Ak Altyn Kara-Suu	22	13	6	3	47	19	+28	45
5	Dinamo Alay Osh	22	11	6	5	44	24	+20	39
6	Dordoy Naryn	22	11	4	7	44	29	+15	37
7	Dinamo Manas SKIF Bishkek	22	7	2	13	34	54	−20	23
8	KVT Dinamo Kara Balta	22	7	1	14	34	58	−24	22
9	Dinamo KPK Jalal Abad	22	6	2	14	21	45	−24	20
10	Semetey Kyzyl Kiya	22	5	1	16	24	52	−28	16
11	Manas Dinamo Talas	22	3	2	17	20	92	−72	11
12	Issyk Kul Karakol	22	1	1	20	25	89	−64	4

Source: rsssf.com
