= Sergei Ivanov (footballer, born 1980) =

Kyrgyzstani footballer

Personal information
- Date of birth: 30 May 1980 (age 46)
- Place of birth: Kyrgyz SSR, Soviet Union
- Height: 1.73 m (5 ft 8 in)
- Positions: Forward; midfielder

Senior career*
Years	Team	Apps	(Gls)
1996–1999	Dinamo Bishkek	60	(28)
2000	Kairat Almaty	25	(2)
2001–2002	Anzhi Makhachkala	9	(0)
2002	SKA-PVO Bishkek	0	(0)
2003	Irtysh	13	(1)
2003–2004	Ekibastuzetc	42	(8)
2005	Taraz	21	(1)
2006–2007	Ekibastuzetc	52	(6)
2008–2014	Irtysh	155	(15)
Total		377	(61)

International career
1997–2001	Kyrgyzstan	15	(1)
- * Club domestic league appearances and goals

Sergei Nikolayevich Ivanov (Russian: Серге́й Николаевич Иванов; born 30 May 1980) is a Kyrgyzstani former international footballer.

== Career ==
During his career, Ivanov played for Dinamo Bishkek and SKA-PVO Bishkek in his native Kyrgyzstan, Anzhi Makhachkala in Russia, and FC Kairat, FC Ekibastuzets, FC Taraz and FC Irtysh in Kazakhstan.

Ivanov also represented Kyrgyzstan between 1997 and 2001.

== Career statistics ==
=== Club ===
As of match played 9 November 2014

Club performance			League		Cup		Continental		Total	
Season	Club	League	Apps	Goals	Apps	Goals	Apps	Goals	Apps	Goals
1996	Dinamo Bishkek	Kyrgyzstan League	10	2			-		10	2
1997	Dinamo Bishkek	Kyrgyzstan League	18	8			-		18	8
1998	Dinamo Bishkek	Kyrgyzstan League	17	7			-		17	7
1999	Dinamo Bishkek	Kyrgyzstan League	15	11			-		15	11
2000	Kairat	Kazakhstan Top Division	25	2			-		25	2
2001	Anzhi Makhachkala	Russian Premier League	7	0			0	0	7	0
2002	Anzhi Makhachkala	Russian Premier League	2	0			-		2	0
2003	Irtysh	Kazakhstan Premier League	13	1			1	0	14	1
2003	Ekibastuzets	Kazakhstan Premier League	14	1			-		14	1
2004	Ekibastuzets	Kazakhstan Premier League	27	7			-		27	7
2005	Taraz	Kazakhstan Premier League	21	1			-		21	1
2006	Ekibastuzets	Kazakhstan Premier League	28	3			-		28	3
2007	Ekibastuzets	Kazakhstan Premier League	24	3			-		24	3
2008	Irtysh	Kazakhstan Premier League	24	3			-		24	3
2009	Irtysh	Kazakhstan Premier League	23	2			2	0	25	2
2010	Irtysh	Kazakhstan Premier League	31	3			-		31	3
2011	Irtysh	Kazakhstan Premier League	23	1	2	1	4	0	29	2
2012	Irtysh	Kazakhstan Premier League	23	4	3	1	-		26	5
2013	Irtysh	Kazakhstan Premier League	18	1	3	0	1	0	22	1
2014	Irtysh	Kazakhstan Premier League	13	1	1	0	-		14	1
Total	Kyrgyzstan		60	28			-		60	28
Total	Kazakhstan		308	33	9	2	8	0	325	35
Total	Russia		9	0			0	0	9	0
Career total			377	61	9	2	8	0	394	63

=== International ===
Kyrgyzstan national team
Year	Apps	Goals
1997	4	1
1999	3	0
2000	1	0
2001	7	0
Total	15	1

Statistics accurate as of 9 September 2014

=== International goals ===
No.	Date	Venue	Opponent	Score	Result	Competition	Ref.
1.	13 June 1997	Azadi Stadium, Tehran, Iran	Maldives	5–0	6–0	1998 FIFA WCQ	

== Honours ==
=== Club ===
Dinamo Bishkek

- Kyrgyzstan League (3): 1997, 1998, 1999
