= Zakir Dzhalilov =

Kyrgyzstani footballer

Personal information
- Full name: Zakir Dilyaverovich Dzhalilov
- Date of birth: July 30, 1972 (age 54)
- Place of birth: Frunze, Soviet Union
- Height: 1.87 m (6 ft 1 1/2 in)
- Position: Goalkeeper

Senior career*
Years	Team	Apps	(Gls)
1990	Alga Frunze	1	(0)
1992	Instrumentalschik	19	(0)
1993	Alga RIIF	27	(0)
1994	Ak-Maral	7	(0)
1995	Lokomotiv Nizhniy Novgorod	0	
1995–1996	AIK Bishkek	14	
1996–1997	Yelimay	21	(0)
1998–1999	SKA-PVO Bishkek	38	(2)
1999	Shakhter Karagandy	2	(0)
2000	SKA-PVO Bishkek	19	(1)
2001	Shakhter Karagandy	12	(0)
2001–2003	Tampines Rovers	59	(0)
2004–2006	Dordoy-Dinamo Naryn	32+	(0)
2007	Aviator-AAL Bishkek		
2008	Avangard	8	(0)
2009–2011	Neftchi		
2013–2014	Abdish-Ata		

International career
1992–2004	Kyrgyzstan	29	(0)

Managerial career
- 2015–: Kyrgyzstan (goalkeeping coach)
- * Club domestic league appearances and goals

Zakir Dilyaverovich Dzhalilov (Kyrgyz: Закир Жалилов; Russian: Закир Диляверович Джалилов; born July 30, 1972) is a Kyrgyz former footballer. He is the current goalkeeping coach of Kyrgyzstan.

== Career ==
Dzhalilov played for many team in his native Kyrgyzstan, as well as for Yelimay and Shakhter Karagandy in Kazakhstan and Tampines Rovers in Singapore.

== Personal life ==
His son Raul is also a footballer who plays for Bolat in the Kazakhstan First Division.

== Career statistics ==
Kyrgyzstan national team
Year	Apps	Goals
1992	2	0
1993	2	0
1994	4	0
2000	3	0
2001	5	0
2003	4	0
2004	8	0
Total	29	0
