= 1999 Kyrgyzstan League =

National football league season

Kyrgyzstan League
- Season: 1999
- Champions: Dinamo Bishkek

Statistics of Kyrgyzstan League for the 1999 season.

== Overview ==
It was contested by 12 teams, and Dinamo Bishkek won the championship.

== League standings ==
| Pos | Team | Pld | W | D | L | GF | GA | GD | Pts |
|---|---|---|---|---|---|---|---|---|---|
| 1 | Dinamo Bishkek | 22 | 17 | 3 | 2 | 60 | 12 | +48 | 54 |
| 2 | SKA PVO Bishkek | 22 | 14 | 6 | 2 | 60 | 14 | +46 | 48 |
| 3 | Zhashtyk Ak Altyn Kara-Suu | 22 | 15 | 2 | 5 | 48 | 18 | +30 | 47 |
| 4 | Polyot Bishkek | 22 | 14 | 5 | 3 | 50 | 18 | +32 | 47 |
| 5 | Dordoy Naryn | 22 | 11 | 0 | 11 | 37 | 40 | −3 | 33 |
| 6 | SKNG Guardia Bishkek | 22 | 9 | 4 | 9 | 34 | 28 | +6 | 31 |
| 7 | KVT Dinamo Kara Balta | 22 | 9 | 3 | 10 | 31 | 42 | −11 | 30 |
| 8 | Dinamo Alay Osh | 22 | 8 | 6 | 8 | 40 | 48 | −8 | 30 |
| 9 | Semetey Kyzyl Kiya | 22 | 9 | 2 | 11 | 34 | 29 | +5 | 29 |
| 10 | Energetik Kara Kul | 22 | 3 | 1 | 18 | 12 | 61 | −49 | 10 |
| 11 | Dinamo Ala Buka | 22 | 2 | 3 | 17 | 15 | 58 | −43 | 9 |
| 12 | Dinamo Jalal Abad | 22 | 2 | 3 | 17 | 9 | 62 | −53 | 9 |

Source: rsssf.com
