= FC Alay =

Kyrgyz football club

- Full name: Football Club Alay; Алай футбол клубу
- Founded: 1960; 66 years ago
- Ground: Suyumbayev Stadion, Osh
- Capacity: 12,000
- Chairman: Baymat Jalilov
- Manager: Mirlan Eshenov
- League: Kyrgyz Premier League
- 2025: KPL, 5th of 14
Home colours	Away colours

FC Alay (Kyrgyz: Алай футбол клубу) is a Kyrgyz professional football club based in Osh, that plays in the top division, Kyrgyz Premier League.

== History ==
=== Names ===
- 1960 : Founded as Osh
- 1965 : Renamed Shakhtyor
- 1967 : Renamed Alay
- 1996 : Renamed Dinamo-Alay
- 2002 : Renamed Alay

=== Domestic history ===
Season	League									Kyrgyzstan Cup	Top goalscorer	
Season	Div.	Pos.	Pl.	W	D	L	GS	GA	P	Kyrgyzstan Cup	Name	League
1992	1st	3	22	12	3	7	55	24	27	Runner-up	Davron Babayev	38
1993	1st	3	32	25	3	4	110	49	53	Semi-final		
1994	1st	6	26	12	7	7	49	28	31	Runner-up		
1995	1st	6	14	3	7	4	19	25	16			
1996	1st	3	22	14	3	5	47	18	45			
1997	1st	5	18	8	4	6	29	19	28	Runner-up		
1998	1st	4	14	5	3	6	21	24	18	Runner-up	Mamanov	15
1999	1st	8	22	8	6	8	40	48	30	Quarter-final	Rajabaliyev	15
2000	1st	5	22	11	6	5	44	24	39	Runner-up		
2001	1st	5	28	10	5	13	48	59	35	Semi-final		
2002	1st	4	18	10	2	6	33	18	32	Semi-final		
2003	1st	6	14	2	4	8	14	27	10	Semi-final	Mirlan Mirzaliyev	22
2004	1st	6	36	13	3	20	48	60	42	Semi-final	Almaz Mirzaliyev; Mirlan Mirzaliyev	10
2005	1st	5	24	7	4	13	37	56	25	Round of 16	Mirlan Mirzaliev	8
2006	1st	5	10	1	3	6	8	16	6	Semi-final	Almazbek Mirzaliev	11
2007	1st	5	32	16	3	13	48	32	51	Semi-final		
2008	1st	3	16	9	2	5	22	16	29	Semi-final	Yodgorbek Akbarov	9
2009	1st	3	22	11	5	6	40	27	38	Runner-up		
2010	1st	8	withdrew						-	-		
2011	1st	5	20	5	3	12	25	36	18	Semi-final		
2012	1st	3	28	14	7	7	45	27	49			
2013	1st	1	20	13	4	3	38	19	43	Winners		
2014	1st	4	20	10	2	8	44	23	30	Semi-final	Almazbek Mirzaliev	12
2015	1st	1	20	16	2	2	48	18	50		Alia Sylla	17
2016	1st	1	18	14	3	1	59	10	45	Runner-Up	Alia Sylla	21
2017	1st	1	20	13	2	5	51	25	41	Runner-Up	Alia Sylla	12
2018	1st	2	28	18	6	4	79	35	60	Runner-Up	Joel Kojo	26
2019	1st	2	28	20	2	6	66	35	62	Quarterfinal	Joel Kojo	15
2020	1st	5	14	7	2	5	16	12	23	Winners	Joel Kojo	7
2021	1st	4	28	13	7	8	45	38	46	Semifinal	Eldar Moldozhunusov; Emmanuel Yaghr	8

=== Continental history ===
As of match played 15 August 2023

Competition	Pld	W	D	L	GF	GA
AFC Cup	26	2	3	21	25	67
Total	26	2	3	21	25	67

Season	Competition	Round	Opponent	Home	Away	Aggregate
2014	AFC Cup	Play-off	(Palestine) Shabab Al-Dhahiriya	–	0–0 (p)	0–0
2014	AFC Cup	Group	(Jordan) Shabab Al-Ordon	0–1	1–2	4th
2014	AFC Cup	Group	(Bahrain) Al-Riffa	0–0	0–2	4th
2014	AFC Cup	Group	(Iraq) Erbil SC	3–0	0–6	4th
2016	AFC Cup	Play-off	(Lebanon) Tripoli	–	0–0 (p)	0–0
2017	AFC Cup	Group D	(Kyrgyzstan) Dordoi Bishkek	5–4	0–1	4th
2017	AFC Cup	Group D	(Tajikistan) Istiklol	1–3	1–4	4th
2017	AFC Cup	Group D	(Turkmenistan) Altyn Asyr	1–2	1–4	4th
2018	AFC Cup	Group D	(Tajikistan) Istiklol	2–3	0–1	4th
2018	AFC Cup	Group D	(Turkmenistan) Altyn Asyr	3–6	0–5	4th
2018	AFC Cup	Group D	(Turkmenistan) Ahal	2–3	0–5	4th
2019	AFC Cup	Preliminary round	(Turkmenistan) Ahal	1–2	0–1	1–3
2021	AFC Cup	Group F	(Tajikistan) Khujand	0–2		4th
2021	AFC Cup	Group F	(Turkmenistan) Altyn Asyr	4–5		4th
2021	AFC Cup	Group F	(Uzbekistan) Nasaf	0–4		4th
2023–24	AFC Cup	Preliminary round	(Turkmenistan) Merw Mary	–	0–1	0–1

== Honours ==
- Kyrgyzstan League
  - Champions (4): 2013, 2015, 2016, 2017
  - Runners-up (3): 2018, 2019, 2022
- Kyrgyzstan Cup
  - Winners (2): 2013, 2020
  - Runners-up (6): 1992, 1994, 2009, 2016, 2017, 2018
- Kyrgyzstan Super Cup
  - Winners (3): 2017, 2018, 2023

== Players ==
=== Current squad ===
As of 2 April, 2026

Note: Flags indicate national team as defined under FIFA eligibility rules; some limited exceptions apply. Players may hold more than one non-FIFA nationality.

No.	Pos.	Nation	Player
1	GK	UZB	Islam Abdullaev
2	MF	AZE	Jamal Jafarov
3	DF	UKR	Artem Fedorov
4	MF	SRI	Garrett Kelly
5	DF	KGZ	Taimuras Mamyrbaev
6	DF	KGZ	Askarbek Saliev
7	FW	BUL	Georgi Babaliev
8	MF	KGZ	Keldibek Talanbek Uulu
9	FW	MDA	Nicolai Solodovnicov
10	FW	KGZ	Shohdzhakhon Satikhonov
11	FW	UZB	Jasur Kholturaev
13	DF	UZB	Jamshid Kobulov
14	FW	UZB	Doniyor Ismoilov

No.	Pos.	Nation	Player
15	DF	KGZ	Adilet Nurlan uulu
16	GK	KGZ	Marsel Ubaidullaev
17	DF	KGZ	Erlan Mashirapov
18	FW	RUS	Nikita Melnikov
19	DF	UZB	Amanbek Manybekov
20	MF	KGZ	Davlyatzhan Baratov
21	DF	KGZ	Mukhammadali Zairov
22	MF	KGZ	Midin Kerezbekov
23	DF	KGZ	Kamolidin Tashiyev
25	GK	UZB	Mirzokhid Mamatkhonov
27	MF	UZB	Abdulloh Olimov
29	FW	KGZ	Nurmukhammed Kutmanaliev
