= 1996 Kyrgyzstan League =

Kyrgyzstan League
- Season: 1996
- Champions: Metallurg Kadamjay
- Matches: 132
- Goals: 409 (3.1 per match)

Statistics of Kyrgyzstan League for the 1996 season.

== Overview ==
It was contested by 12 teams, and Metallurg Kadamjay won the championship.

== League standings ==
Pos	Team	Pld	W	D	L	GF	GA	GD	Pts
1	Metallurg Kadamjay	22	18	2	2	60	15	+45	56
2	AiK Bishkek	22	18	2	2	55	12	+43	56
3	Dinamo Alay Osh	22	14	3	5	47	18	+29	45
4	Dinamo Oil Bishkek	22	13	5	4	39	15	+24	44
5	Alay Gul'cha	22	10	3	9	35	27	+8	33
6	Rotor Bishkek	22	9	3	10	31	34	−3	30
7	Alga PVO Bishkek	22	7	3	12	34	42	−8	24
8	Jalal Abad	22	6	3	13	19	47	−28	21
9	KVT Khimik Kara Balta	22	6	3	13	29	47	−18	21
10	Neftchi Kochkor Ata	22	6	3	13	22	40	−18	21
11	Shumkar Dastan Bishkek	22	5	3	14	17	40	−23	18
12	Semetey Kyzyl Kiya	22	3	1	18	21	72	−51	10

Source: rsssf.com
