= Khurshit Lutfullayev =

Kyrgyzstani footballer

Personal information
- Full name: Khurshit Mukhtarzhanović Lutfullayev
- Date of birth: 8 January 1983 (age 43)
- Place of birth: Bishkek
- Position: Striker

Senior career*
Years	Team	Apps	(Gls)
2000	Semey	9	(0)
2001	Dinamo KPK	24	(4)
2002	Kysy Kiya	17	(6)
2003–2006	Zhastyk AA	76	(11)
2006–	Abdish Ata		(54)

International career
2007–present	Kyrgyzstan	12	(2)
- * Club domestic league appearances and goals

Khurshit Lutfullayev is a Kyrgyzstani footballer. He is a member of the Kyrgyzstan national football team. He currently play for FC Abdish-Ata Kant.

== Career ==
By the end of the 2013 season, Lutfullayev reached the milestone of scoring at least 100 goals in Kyrgyzstan League and Cup matches.

== Career statistics ==
=== International ===
Kyrgyzstan national team
Year	Apps	Goals
2007	6	2
2008	2	0
2009	0	0
2010	0	0
2011	0	0
2012	0	0
2013	2	0
2014	2	0
2015	0	0
Total	12	2

Statistics accurate as of match played 23 May 2015

=== International goals ===
#	Date	Venue	Opponent	Score	Result	Competition
1	24 August 2007	New Delhi, India	Bangladesh	1–0	3–0	Nehru Cup 2007
2	24 August 2007	New Delhi, India	Bangladesh	2–0	3–0	Nehru Cup 2007
