= Igor Tkachenko (footballer) =

Kyrgyzstani footballer

Personal information
- Date of birth: 14 January 1964 (age 62)
- Place of birth: Frunze, Kyrgyz SSR
- Height: 1.82 m (5 ft 11 1/2 in)
- Positions: Defender; midfielder

Youth career
- RSDYuShOR Frunze

Senior career*
Years	Team	Apps	(Gls)
1982	FC Alga Frunze	8	(0)
1983–1985	FC Selmashevets Frunze		
1986–1989	FC Alga Frunze	100	(5)
1990	FC Dostuk Sokuluk	24	(6)
1991	FC Vostok	40	(2)
1992	FC Krystal Chortkiv	23	(1)
1992–1993	FC Uralmash Yekaterinburg	26	(0)
1994	FC Metallurg Novotroitsk	3	(0)
1995–1996	FC Rotor Bishkek	30	(3)
1998	KVT Dinamo Kara-Balta	11	(2)
2000	FC Ekolog Bishkek	19	(4)
2002	FC Dordoi Bishkek	7	(1)
- * Club domestic league appearances and goals

Igor Tkachenko (Russian: Игорь Ткаченко; born 14 January 1964 in Frunze) is a former Kyrgyzstani football player.
