= 2004 Kyrgyzstan League =

Kyrgyzstan League
- Season: 2004
- Champions: Dordoi-Dynamo Naryn

Statistics of Kyrgyzstan League for the 2004 season.

== Overview ==
It was contested by 10 teams, and Dordoi-Dynamo Naryn won the championship.

== League standings ==
Pos	Team	Pld	W	D	L	GF	GA	GD	Pts
1	Dordoi-Dynamo Naryn	36	32	2	2	126	17	+109	98
2	SKA Shoro Bishkek	36	30	3	3	107	20	+87	93
3	Zhashtyk Ak Altyn Kara-Suu	36	25	2	9	84	38	+46	77
4	Guardia RUOR Bishkek	36	20	3	13	66	55	+11	63
5	Abdish-Ata Kant	36	14	4	18	63	75	−12	46
6	Alay Osh	36	13	3	20	48	60	−12	42
7	Jayil Baatyr Kara Balta	36	10	3	23	44	85	−41	33
8	Neftchi Kochkor Ata	36	9	2	25	30	87	−57	29
9	Shoro Bishkek	36	7	2	27	26	88	−62	23
10	Team Kyrgyzstan U-21	36	6	2	28	25	100	−75	20

Source: rsssf.com
