= 2021 Kyrgyzstan Cup =

Tournament details
- Country: Kyrgyzstan
- Teams: 15

Final positions
- Champions: Neftchi Kochkor-Ata
- Runners-up: Alga Bishkek

Tournament statistics
- Matches played: 14
- Goals scored: 66 (4.71 per match)

The 2021 Kyrgyzstan Cup was the 30th season of the Kyrgyzstan Cup, the knockout football tournament in Kyrgyzstan. Neftchi Kochkor-Ata won the title for the second time in their history on 18 September, qualifying for the 2022 AFC Cup as a result.

== Last 16 ==
| 26 May 2021 | Alay-2 | 0 – 3 | Neftchi Kochkor-Ata |
| KGT |

| 28 May 2021 | Anadolu | 0 – 12 | Dordoi Bishkek |
| KGT |

| 29 May 2021 | Toktogul | 0 – 8 | Kaganat |
| KGT |

| 29 May 2021 | Lider-Chempion | 1 – 6 | Kara-Balta |
| KGT |

| 29 May 2021 | Talant | 0 – 7 | Abdysh-Ata Kant |
| KGT |

| 30 May 2021 | Abdysh-Ata Kant-2 | 1 – 2 (a.e.t.) | Alga Bishkek |
| KGT |

| 30 May 2021 | Neftchi Kochkor-Ata-2 | 1 – 2 (a.e.t.) | Kaganat-2 |
| KGT |

| 30 May 2021 | Alay | BYE | - |
| KGT |

== Quarter-finals ==
| 23 June 2021 | Kaganat-2 | 1 – 3 | Neftchi Kochkor-Ata |
| KGT |

| 24 June 2021 | Alay Osh | 1 – 0 | Kaganat |
| KGT |

| 24 June 2021 | Alga Bishkek | 3 – 2 | Kara-Balta |
| KGT |

| 26 June 2021 | Dordoi Bishkek | 3 – 1 | Abdysh-Ata Kant |
| KGT |

== Semi–finals ==
| 6 August 2021 1st leg | Alga Bishkek | 1 – 0 | Dordoi Bishkek |
| KGT |

| 18 August 2021 2nd leg | Dordoi Bishkek | 1 – 3 (1 – 4 agg.) | Alga Bishkek |
| KGT |

| 6 August 2021 1st leg | Alay Osh | 0 – 3 | Neftchi Kochkor-Ata |
| KGT |

| 18 August 2021 2nd leg | Neftchi Kochkor-Ata | 1 – 0 (4 – 0 agg.) | Alay Osh |
| KGT |

== Final ==
| 18 September 2021 | Alga Bishkek | 0 – 0 (a.e.t.) (3 – 4 p) | Neftchi Kochkor-Ata |
| KGT |

== See also ==
- 2021 Kyrgyz Premier League
