= 2019 Kyrgyzstan Cup =

Tournament details
- Country: Kyrgyzstan
- Teams: 17

Final positions
- Champions: Neftchi Kochkor-Ata
- Runners-up: Dordoi Bishkek

Tournament statistics
- Matches played: 18
- Goals scored: 79 (4.39 per match)

The 2019 Kyrgyzstan Cup was the 28th season of the Kyrgyzstan Cup, the knockout football tournament in Kyrgyzstan. The cup winner qualifies for the 2020 AFC Cup.

The draw of the tournament was held on 13 May 2019.

== Preliminary round ==
The preliminary round was played on 17 May 2019.

17 May 2019	Ala-Buka	5–2	Neftchi Kochkor-Ata-2	Ala-Buka
KGT		Report

== Round of 16 ==
The round of 16 was played on 29 May 2019.

29 May 2019	Dordoi Bishkek-2	0–3	Abdysh-Ata Kant
KGT		Report

29 May 2019	Ilbirs Bishkek-2	0–4	Alga Bishkek
KGT		Report

29 May 2019	Abdysh-Ata Kant-2	0–8	Dordoi Bishkek
KGT		Report

29 May 2019	Alga Bishkek-2	1–3	Kara-Balta
KGT		Report

29 May 2019	Ala-Buka	1–4	Academy-Leader
KGT		Report

29 May 2019	Academy-Leader-2	3–2	Ilbirs Bishkek
KGT		Report

29 May 2019	FC Nur-Batken	0–4	Neftchi Kochkor-Ata
KGT		Report

29 May 2019	Alay Osh-2	1–5	Alay Osh
KGT		Report

== Quarter-finals ==
The quarter-finals were played on 3 July 2019.

3 July 2019	Alga Bishkek	0–0 (a.e.t.) (5 – 3 p)	Abdysh-Ata Kant	Bishkek
KGT		Report		Stadium: Dynamo Stadion

3 July 2019	Academy-Leader	7–0	Academy-2
KGT		Report

3 July 2019	Dordoi Bishkek	4–0	Kara-Balta	Bishkek
KGT		Report		Stadium: Stadion Dordoi

3 July 2019	Alay Osh	1–2	Neftchi Kochkor-Ata	Osh
KGT		Report		Stadium: Suyumbayev Stadion

== Semi-finals ==
The first legs were played on 11 August 2019, and the second legs were played on 25 September 2019.

11 August 2019 1st leg	Academy-Leader	0 – 2	Neftchi Kochkor-Ata
(UTC+5)

25 September 2019 2nd leg	Neftchi Kochkor-Ata	5 – 1 (7 – 1 agg.)	Academy-Leader	Kochkor-Ata
(UTC+5)				Stadium: Stadion Neftyannik Kochkor-Ata

11 August 2019 1st leg	Alga Bishkek	2 – 3	Dordoi Bishkek	Bishkek
(UTC+5)				Stadium: Dynamo Stadion

25 September 2019 2nd leg	Dordoi Bishkek	4 – 1 (7 – 3 agg.)	Alga Bishkek	Bishkek
(UTC+5)				Stadium: Stadion Dordoi

== Final ==
The match was played on 27 October 2019.

27 October 2019	Dordoi Bishkek	0–1	Neftchi Kochkor-Ata	Jalal-Abad
KGT		Report	Omuraliev 64'	Referee: Dmitriy Mashentsev

== See also ==
- 2019 Kyrgyz Premier League
