= 2002 Kyrgyzstan League =

Kyrgyzstan League
- Season: 2002
- Champions: SKA PVO Bishkek
- Matches: 90
- Top goalscorer: Yevgeny Boldygin

Statistics of Kyrgyzstan League for the 2002 season.

The 2002 Kyrgyzstan League was contested by 10 teams with SKA PVO Bishkek winning the championship.

== League Standings ==
Pos	Team	Pld	W	D	L	GF	GA	GD	Pts
1	SKA PVO Bishkek	18	15	3	0	47	11	+36	48
2	Zhashtyk Ak Altyn Kara-Suu	18	14	1	3	46	17	+29	43
3	Dordoi Naryn	18	12	3	3	43	13	+30	39
4	Dinamo UVD Osh	18	10	2	6	33	18	+15	32
5	Dinamo Bishkek	18	8	4	6	24	18	+6	28
6	FK Jalal Abad	18	5	4	9	27	35	−8	19
7	RUOR Guardia Bishkek	18	4	3	11	16	33	−17	15
8	FK Kyzyl Kyya	18	3	5	10	25	40	−15	14
9	Ak Bula Aravan	18	3	2	13	23	48	−25	11
10	Kara Shoro Ozgon	18	1	3	14	10	61	−51	6

Source: rsssf.com

== Top scorers ==
Pos	Player	Club	Goals
1	Yevgeny Boldygin	Zhashtyk Ak Altyn Kara-Suu	19
2	Zamirbek Zhumagulov	Dordoi Naryn	16
3	Almazbek Mirzaliyev	Dinamo UVD Osh	10
3	Viacheslav Pryanishnikov	SKA PVO Bishkek	10
