= Mirlan Mirzaliev =

Kyrgyzstani footballer

Personal information
- Date of birth: 19 May 1974 (age 52)
- Place of birth: Kyrgyzstan
- Height: 1.83 m (6 ft 0 in)
- Position: Forward

Senior career*
Years	Team	Apps	(Gls)
1992–1995	Alay Osh	64	(31)
1997	Dinamo Osh	8	(3)
1997–2001	Dinamo Bishkek	64	(35)
2001	Dordoi	21	(6)
2002–2008	Alay	128	(61)
Total		284	(136)

International career
1997–2000	Kyrgyzstan	7	(0)
- * Club domestic league appearances and goals

Mirlan Mirzaliev (born 19 May 1974) is a Kyrgyzstani former professional footballer who played as a forward. He made seven appearances for the Kyrgyzstan national team.
