= 2001 Kyrgyzstan League =

Kyrgyzstan League
- Season: 2001
- Champions: SKA PVO Bishkek

Statistics of Kyrgyzstan League for the 2001 season.

== Overview ==
It was contested by 8 teams, and SKA PVO Bishkek won the championship.

== League standings ==
Pos	Team	Pld	W	D	L	GF	GA	GD	Pts
1	SKA PVO Bishkek	28	20	6	2	73	15	+58	66
2	Zhashtyk Ak Altyn Kara-Suu	28	17	6	5	82	41	+41	57
3	Dordoy Naryn	28	16	5	7	63	35	+28	53
4	Bakay Kara Balta	28	12	8	8	39	32	+7	44
5	Dinamo Alay Osh	28	10	5	13	48	59	−11	35
6	Erkin Farm Bishkek	28	9	6	13	39	51	−12	33
7	Ekolog Bishkek	28	5	5	18	38	62	−24	20
8	Dinamo KPK Jalal Abad	28	1	3	24	16	103	−87	6

Source: rsssf.com
