= 2020 Kyrgyzstan Cup =

Tournament details
- Country: Kyrgyzstan
- Teams: 7

Final positions
- Champions: Alay Osh
- Runners-up: Abdysh-Ata Kant

Tournament statistics
- Matches played: 6
- Goals scored: 16 (2.67 per match)
- Top goal scorer: Maksat Alygulov (3)

The 2020 Kyrgyzstan Cup is the 29th season of the Kyrgyzstan Cup, the knockout football tournament in Kyrgyzstan. The cup winner qualifies for the 2021 AFC Cup.

The draw of the tournament was held on 24 September 2020, based on the 2020 Kyrgyz Premier League final positions. The seven teams which finished second to eighth in the league will participate. Dordoi, which finished first in the league, will not participate as they have already secured qualification for the 2021 AFC Cup.

== Quarter-finals ==
In the quarter-finals, the matchups were decided by draw:

- Match 1: 8th vs 3rd
- Match 2: 7th vs 4th
- Match 3: 6th vs 5th

The matches, originally scheduled for 9 October, will be played on 16 October.

16 October 2020
14:00 KGT

Ilbirs	0–2	Neftchi
Bayaman Kumarbai uulu (yellow card) 62'; Mamatzia Zholdoshov (yellow card) 82'; Aydar Azhymambetov (yellow card) 82'; Azhibek Ruslan uulu (red card) 84'	Report	Akhmedov 31'; Umidillo Iminov 53'; Azamat Abdullaev (yellow card) 82'; Azamat Omuraliev (red card) 84'

Nitro-Arena Stadium, Kant

16 October 2020
14:00 KGT

Kara-Balta	1–5	Abdysh-Ata
Ermek Niyazaliev 9'; Zhanysh Kurenkeev (yellow card) 54'; Marat Dzhumabaev (yellow card) 81'; Rustam Mayrambek uulu (yellow card) 90'	Report	Victor Amartey (yellow card) 18'; Farhad Turdiev 56' (o.g.); Duyshobekov 66' (pen.); Maksat Alygulov 88', 90'; Eldiyar Sardarbekov 90'

Central Stadium, Kant

16 October 2020
14:00 KGT

Kaganat	1–3	Alay Osh
Kelechek Kasymov (yellow card) 27'; Maksat Alimov 51'; Bekzatbek Nasirov (yellow card) 63'	Report	Kojo 22', 64'; Timur Talipov (yellow card) 27'; Askarbek Saliev (yellow card) 42'; Kelvin Inkoom 90'; Dastan Alybekov (yellow card) 90'

Sport-City Stadium, Kant

== Semi-finals ==
The semi-finals were played on 19 October 2020 after originally being scheduled for 12 October 2020.

19 October 2020
14:00 KGT

Abdysh-Ata	1–0	Alga
Davlyatzhan Baratov (yellow card) 11'; Maksat Alygulov 45'; Ata Geldyev (yellow card) 54'; Rakhat Zhaparov (yellow card) 90'	Report	Vlasichev (yellow card) 45'; Mamyraliev (yellow card) 46' (yellow-red card) 83'

Central Stadium, Kant

19 October 2020
14:00 KGT

Alay Osh	1–1	Neftchi
Nurlan Ryspaev (yellow card) 25'; Abdurakhmanov (yellow card) 29'; Erlan Mashirapov 46'; Ajiniyazov (yellow card) 63'; Kojo (yellow card) 77'; Gvanzav Magomedov (yellow card) 90'	Report	Argen Zhumataev (yellow card) 29'; Akram Umarov (yellow card) 45'; Azamat Abdullaev (yellow card) 75'; Eldar Moldozhunusov 81'
Penalties
	5–3

Nitro-Arena Stadium, Kant

== Final ==
The 2020 Kyrgyzstan Cup was played on 22 October 2020 after originally being scheduled for 15 October 2020.

22 October 2020
14:00 KGT

Alay Osh	1–0	Abdysh-Ata
Abdurakhmanov (yellow card) 24'; Kelvin Inkoom 36'; Taalaibek Uulu Baktai (yellow card) 38'; Nurlan Ryspaev (yellow card) 66'; Dastan Alybekov (yellow card) 90'; Kojo (yellow card) 90'	Report	Ata Geldyev (yellow card) 31'; Ilgiz Ermekov (yellow card) 41'; Duyshobekov (yellow card) 85'

Central Stadium, Kant
Referee: Urmat Bayaliev

== Goal scorers ==
As of match played 22 October 2020

3 goals:

- (Kyrgyzstan) Maksat Alygulov - Abdysh-Ata

2 goals:

- (Ghana) Kelvin Inkoom - Alay Osh
- (Ghana) Joel Kojo - Alay Osh

1 goals:

- (Kyrgyzstan) Bakhtiyar Duyshobekov - Abdysh-Ata
- (Kyrgyzstan) Eldiyar Sardarbekov - Abdysh-Ata
- (Kyrgyzstan) Erlan Mashirapov - Alay Osh
- (Kyrgyzstan) Ermek Niyazaliev - Kara-Balta
- (Kyrgyzstan) Murolimzhon Akhmedov - Neftchi
- (Kyrgyzstan) Umidillo Iminov - Neftchi
- (Kyrgyzstan) Eldar Moldozhunusov - Neftchi

Own goals:

- (Kyrgyzstan) Farhad Turdiev Kara-Balta against Abdysh-Ata (16 October 2020)

== See also ==
- 2020 Kyrgyz Premier League
