= 1997 Kyrgyzstan League =

Kyrgyzstan League
- Season: 1997
- Champions: Dinamo Bishkek

Statistics for the Kyrgyzstan League for the 1997 season.

== Overview ==
There were 10 teams. Dinamo Bishkek won the championship.

== League standings ==
| Pos | Team | Pld | W | D | L | GF | GA | GD | Pts |
|---|---|---|---|---|---|---|---|---|---|
| 1 | Dinamo Bishkek | 18 | 15 | 1 | 2 | 52 | 10 | +42 | 46 |
| 2 | Alga PVO Bishkek | 18 | 13 | 2 | 3 | 44 | 15 | +29 | 41 |
| 3 | AiK Bishkek | 18 | 13 | 1 | 4 | 38 | 15 | +23 | 40 |
| 4 | KVT Dinamo Kara Balta | 18 | 10 | 3 | 5 | 43 | 30 | +13 | 33 |
| 5 | Dinamo Alay Osh | 18 | 8 | 4 | 6 | 29 | 19 | +10 | 28 |
| 6 | Semetey Dinamo Kyzyl Kiya | 18 | 7 | 4 | 7 | 28 | 25 | +3 | 25 |
| 7 | Alay Gul'cha | 18 | 4 | 4 | 10 | 22 | 30 | −8 | 16 |
| 8 | Zhashtyk Osh | 18 | 3 | 3 | 12 | 17 | 41 | −24 | 12 |
| 9 | Neftchi Kochkor Ata | 18 | 2 | 4 | 12 | 13 | 57 | −44 | 10 |
| 10 | Dinamo Jalal Abad | 18 | 1 | 2 | 15 | 8 | 52 | −44 | 5 |

Source: rsssf.com
