= Igor Sergeyev (disambiguation) =

Igor Sergeyev may refer to:

- Igor Sergeyev (1938–2006), Defense Minister of the Russian Federation, 1997–2001
- Igor Sergeyev (footballer, born 1969) (born 1969), Kyrgyzstani former footballer
- Igor Sergeev, (born 1993), Uzbek professional footballer
