= 2017 Kyrgyzstan League =

Kyrgyzstan League
- Season: 2017
- Matches: 39
- Goals: 157 (4.03 per match)

The 2017 Kyrgyzstan League was the 26th season of Kyrgyzstan League, the Football Federation of Kyrgyz Republic's top division of association football. Alay Osh are the defending champions, having won the previous season.

== Teams ==
Locations of teams in the 2017 Kyrgyzstan League

Note: Table lists in alphabetical order.

Team	Location	Venue	Capacity	Manager	Captain
Abdysh-Ata Kant	Kant	Stadion Sportkompleks Abdysh-Ata	3,000		
Alay Osh	Osh	Suyumbayev Stadion	11,200		
Alga Bishkek	Bishkek	Dolen Omurzakov Stadium	23,000		
Dordoi Bishkek	Bishkek	Dolen Omurzakov Stadium	23,000		
Kara-Balta	Kara-Balta	Manas Stadium	4,000		
Neftchi	Kochkor-Ata	Stadion Neftyannik Kochkor-Ata	5,000		

== League table ==
Pos	Team	Pld	W	D	L	GF	GA	GD	Pts	Qualification
1	Alay Osh (C)	20	13	2	5	51	25	+26	41	Qualifies for the 2018 AFC Cup
2	Abdysh-Ata Kant	20	12	2	6	35	19	+16	38	
3	Dordoi Bishkek	20	10	5	5	34	15	+19	35	Qualifies for the 2018 AFC Cup
4	Neftchi Kochkorata	20	6	5	9	18	26	−8	23	
5	Alga Bishkek	20	5	6	9	19	32	−13	21	
6	Kara-Balta	20	3	2	15	20	57	−37	11	

Updated to match(es) played on 23 October 2017. Source: FIFA
Rules for classification: 1) points; 2) goal difference; 3) number of goals scored.
(C) Champions

== Results ==
=== First round ===
Home \ Away	AAK	AOS	ABI	DBI	KAB	NEF
Abdysh-Ata		0–1	3–0	2–1	3–0	1–1
Alay Osh	3–0		4–2	1–1	4–2	2–1
Alga Bishkek	1–3	0–4		0–0	1–2	0–0
Dordoi Bishkek	1–0	1–2	1–1		3–0	5–0
Kara-Balta	2–1	1–6	1–4	1–2		2–2
Neftchi	1–3	1–2	0–1	2–1	1–0	

Updated to match(es) played on 17 July 2017. Source: https://www.soccerway.com/kyrgyzstan/premier-liga-2017/results/
Legend: Blue = home team win; Yellow = draw; Red = away team win.

=== Second round ===
Home \ Away	AAK	AOS	ABI	DBI	KAB	NEF
Abdysh-Ata		2–0	2–0	3–1	4–1	1–0
Alay Osh	1–1		2–1	1–3	10–0	0–1
Alga Bishkek	0–4	3–2		0–0	2–0	1–1
Dordoi Bishkek	4–1	1–2	0–0		5–1	1–0
Kara-Balta	0–1	3–1	1–2	1–2		1–2
Neftchi	1–0	1–3	2–0	0–1	1–1	

Updated to match(es) played on 21 October 2017. Source: https://www.soccerway.com/kyrgyzstan/premier-liga-2017/results/
Legend: Blue = home team win; Yellow = draw; Red = away team win.

== Top scorers ==
As of match played 21 October 2017

Rank	Player	Club	Goals
1	(Guinea) Alia Sylla	Alay	12
2	(Uzbekistan) Alisher Azizov	Dordoi	10
3	(Nigeria) Aleriwa Oluwatosin	Abdysh-Ata Kant	7
3	(Kyrgyzstan) Maksat Alimov	Alay	7
5	(Kyrgyzstan) Murolimzhon Akhmedov	Alay	6
5	(Kyrgyzstan) Odiljon Abdurakhmanov	Alay	6
7	(Kyrgyzstan) Alisher Tukhtasinov	Neftchi Kochkor-Ata	5
7	(Kyrgyzstan) Atay Dzhumashev	Kara-Balta	5
7	(Kyrgyzstan) Ivan Filatov	Abdysh-Ata Kant	5
7	(Kyrgyzstan) Ildar Amirov	Alga	5
