= FC Tsementnik Kant =

Kyrgyz football club

Tsementnik Kant
- Full name: FC Tsementnik Kant
- Ground: Stadion Sportkompleks Abdysh-Ata; Kant, Kyrgyzstan
- Capacity: 3,000
- League: Kyrgyzstan League
- 1995: 8th

FC Tsementnik Kant is a Kyrgyzstani football club based in Kant, Kyrgyzstan.

== History ==
- 1992: Founded as FC Tsementnik Kant.
- 2001: Renamed to FC KTsShK Kant.
- 2002: Renamed to FC Tsementnik Kant.

FC Tsementnik Kant started in the 1995 season.

== Achievements ==
- Kyrgyzstan League:

8th place: 1995

- Kyrgyzstan Cup:

1/8 finals: 1992, 2002
