= Artem Bely =

Belarusian professional footballer

Personal information
- Date of birth: 28 April 1997 (age 29)
- Place of birth: Soligorsk, Minsk Oblast, Belarus
- Height: 1.86 m (6 ft 1 in)
- Position: Goalkeeper

Team information
- Current team: Neftchi Kochkor-Ata
- Number: 97

Youth career
- 2013–2015: Dinamo Minsk

Senior career*
Years	Team	Apps	(Gls)
2016–2018	Isloch Minsk Raion	1	(0)
2019	Arsenal Dzerzhinsk	26	(0)
2020	Baikonur	4	(0)
2021	Naftan Novopolotsk	0	(0)
2022–2023	Lida	51	(0)
2024–2025	Ostrovets	22	(0)
2026–	Neftchi Kochkor-Ata	8	(0)

International career^{‡}
2013	Belarus U17	2	(0)
2016	Belarus U21	1	(0)
- * Club domestic league appearances and goals as of 23 August 2026 ‡ National team caps and goals as of 1 June 2017

Artem Bely (Belarusian: Арцём Белы; Russian: Артём Белый; born 28 April 1997) is a Belarusian professional footballer who plays for Neftchi Kochkor-Ata.
