= FC Dinamo-Chuy UVD =

Kyrgyz football club

Dinamo-Chuy UVD
- Full name: FC Dinamo-Chuy UVD
- Ground: Chuy Region, Kyrgyzstan
- League: Kyrgyz Premier League
- 1995: 7th

FC Dinamo-Chuy UVD is a Kyrgyzstani football club based in Chuy Region, Kyrgyzstan that played in the top division in Kyrgyzstan, the Kyrgyz Premier League.

== History ==
- 19??: Founded as FC Dinamo-Chuy UVD.

== Achievements ==
Kyrgyz Premier League:

- 7th place: 1995 (Promotion/relegation play Off: Northern Zone)

Kyrgyzstan Cup:

- 1/16 finals: 2001
