= Kayumzhan Sharipov =

Kyrgyzstani footballer

Kayumjan Sharipov
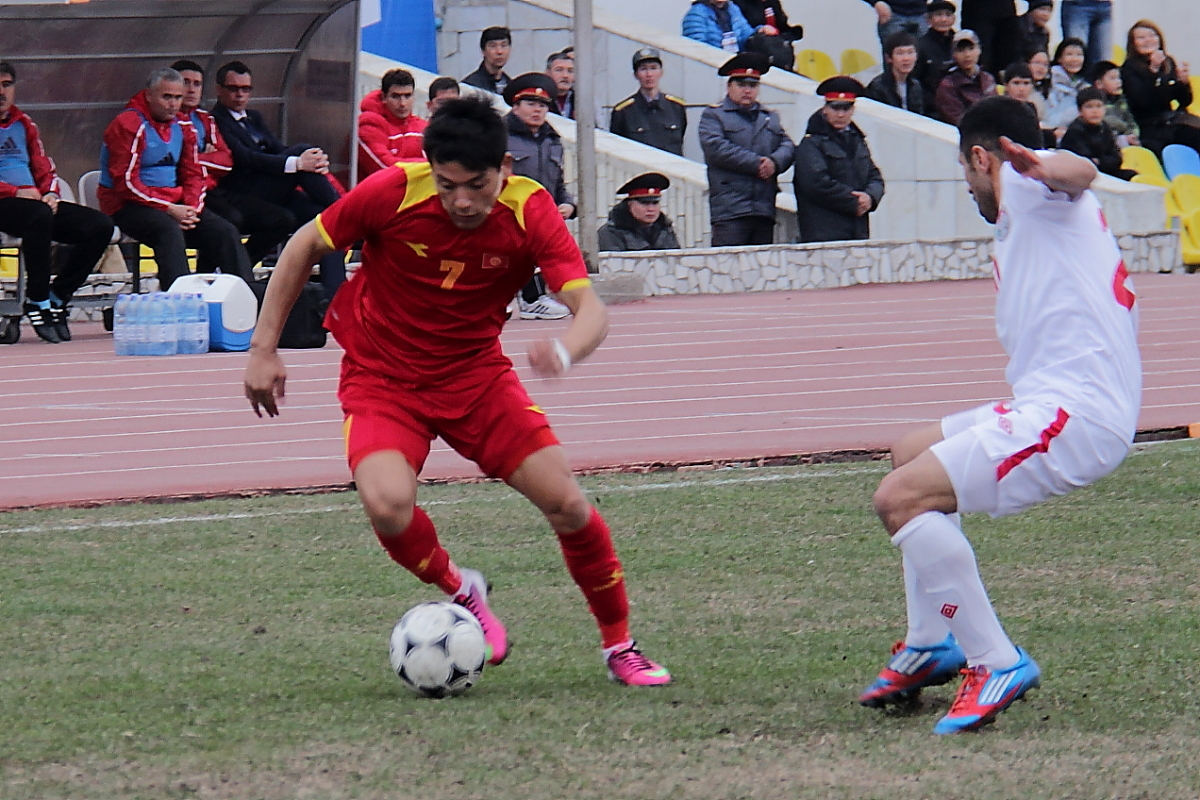
- Sharipov (left) in action during the 2014 AFC Challenge Cup qualification match against Tajikistan

Personal information
- Full name: Kayumjan Sharipov
- Date of birth: 27 June 1991 (age 35)
- Place of birth: Bishkek, Kyrgyzstan
- Positions: Striker; midfielder

Team information
- Current team: Türk Metal Kırıkkalespor

Senior career*
Years	Team	Apps	(Gls)
2007–2010	Abdysh Ata-2	36	(9)
2010	Neftchi	19	(3)
2011–2014	Dordoi	55	(33)
2014	→ Gandzasar Kapan (loan)	2	(0)
2014–2015	Osmanlıspor	10	(0)
2015–2016	Elazığ Belediyespor		
2016–2017	Serhat Ardahanspor		
2017–	Türk Metal Kırıkkalespor		

International career^{‡}
2011–	Kyrgyzstan	11	(1)
- * Club domestic league appearances and goals as of 2 September 2016 ‡ National team caps and goals as of 2 September 2016

Kayumjan Sharipov (born 27 June 1991) is a Kyrgyzstani football player for Türk Metal Kırıkkalespor.

== Career ==
=== Club ===
In February 2019, Sharipov joined Gandzasar Kapan on loan for the remainder of the 2013–14 season.

=== International ===
Sharipov made his debut for the senior Kyrgyzstan team in 2011, when he played in 2014 FIFA World Cup qualifiers against Uzbekistan.

He scored his first goal for the senior team in June 2012, in a friendly against Kazakhstan. The same summer he was one of the key players of the U-22 team, playing in all five matches of the 2013 AFC U-22 Asian Cup qualification. He scored twice during the campaign, however this did not help his team, with Kyrgyzstan taking the third place in the group and not reaching the finals.

Sharipov was regarded as one of the best players in Kyrgyzstan's successful 2014 AFC Challenge Cup qualifiers campaign. Starting in two matches and used as a substitute in one more, he assisted David Tetteh in scoring a winner in a 1–0 win against Pakistan.

== Career statistics ==
=== International ===
Kyrgyzstan national team
Year	Apps	Goals
2010	1	0
2011	2	0
2012	1	1
2013	6	0
2014	1	0
Total	11	1

Statistics accurate as of match played 5 September 2014

=== International goals ===
#	Date	Venue	Opponent	Score	Result	Competition	Ref.
1.	1 June 2012	Central Stadium, Almaty, Kazakhstan	Kazakhstan	2–3	2–5	Friendly	
