= Igor Sergeyev (footballer, born 1969) =

Kyrgyzstani footballer

Personal information
- Full name: Igor Nikolaevich Sergeyev
- Date of birth: 11 September 1969 (age 57)
- Place of birth: Kyrgyz SSR
- Position: Forward

Senior career*
Years	Team	Apps	(Gls)
1989	Dostuk Sokuluk		
1990	Alga Frunze	20	(2)
1990	Dostuk Sokuluk	7	(1)
1991	Gazovik Orenburg	37	(2)
1992	SKA-Dostuk Sokuluk	21	(26)
1993	Metallurg Novotroitsk	4	(1)
1993	SKA-Dostuk Sokuluk	8	(11)
1993–1994	Ak-Maral Tokmok	31	(22)
1999–2000	Maccabi Ironi Shlomi		

International career^{‡}
1992–1994	Kyrgyzstan	5	(1)
- * Club domestic league appearances and goals as of 9 July 2020 ‡ National team caps and goals as of 9 July 2020

Igor Nikolaevich Sergeyev (Russian: Игорь Николаевич Сергеев; born 11 September 1969) is a Kyrgyz former football player.

== Career statistics ==
=== International ===
As of match played 17 April 1994

Appearances and goals by national team and year
National team	Year	Apps	Goals
Kyrgyzstan	1992	2	0
Kyrgyzstan	1993	0	0
Kyrgyzstan	1994	3	1
Total		5	1

As of goal scored on 13 April 1994
Scores and results list Kyrgyzstan's goal tally first, score column indicates score after each Kyrgyzstan goal.

List of international goals scored by Igor Sergeyev
No.	Date	Venue	Opponent	Score	Result	Competition	Ref.
1	13 April 1994	MHSK Stadium, Tashkent, Uzbekistan	Turkmenistan	1–5	1–5	Friendly	

== Honours ==
Ak-Maral Tokmok

- Kyrgyzstan Cup (1): 1994
