= 2011 Kyrgyzstan Cup =

Kyrgyzstan Soccer Competition

The Kyrgyzstan Cup is an annual Kyrgyzstan football competition between domestic clubs.

== Play-off Round ==
=== 1/32 Round ===
| Team 1 | Score | Team 2 |
|---|---|---|
| Dordoi-2 Bishkek | 3–0 | FFKR 95 Bishkek |
| Kara-Balta Kara-Balta | 4–0 | Kyzyl-Tuu Kyzyl-Tuu |
| Say Sokuluk | 0-1 | Zhivoye Pivo Kant |
| Norus Novo-Pokrovka | 0-1 | Voenno-Antonovka Voenno-Antonovka |
| Ala-Too Naryn | 1–2 | Alga-2 Bishkek |
| Shopokov Shopokov | 4-2 | Dordoi-94 Bishkek |
| Vetka Leninskoye | 3-1 | Nashe Pivo Kant |
| Zheruy-Altyn Talas | 3-0 | Khimik Belovodsk |

=== 1/16 Round ===
| Team 1 | Score | Team 2 |
|---|---|---|
| Zhivoye Pivo | 6–1 | Norus |
| Nashe Pivo | 2–4 | Kara-Balta |
| Dordoi-2 | 8–0 | Alga-2 |
| Dordoi-94 | 3–0 | Zheruy Altyn |

=== 1/8 round ===
| Team 1 | Score | Team 2 |
|---|---|---|
| Alay-2 Osh | 1–13 | Neftchi Kochkor-Ata |
| Ak-Zhol | 2–1 | Aldier |
| Neftchi-2 Kochkor-Ata | 0–3 | Alay Osh |
| Tash-Kumyr | 0–3 | Energetik |
| Zhivoe Pivo | 2–0 | Alga |
| Dordoi-94 | 1–6 | Dordoi Bishkek |
| Kara-Balta | 0–5 | Abdish-Ata Kant |
| Dordoi-2 | 2–0 | Issyk-Kol Issyk-Kol |

=== 1/4 Round ===
| Team 1 | Agg. | Team 2 | 1st leg | 2nd leg |
|---|---|---|---|---|
| Neftchi | 6–0 | Ak-Zhol | 3-0 | 3-0 |
| Energetik | 1–7 | Alay | 1-4 | 0-3 |
| | – | | - | - |
| | – | | - | - |

=== 1/2 Round ===
| Team 1 | Agg. | Team 2 | 1st leg | 2nd leg |
|---|---|---|---|---|
| Dordoi Bishkek | 1–2 | Neftchi Kochkor-Ata | 1-1 | 0-1 |
| Abdish-Ata Kant | 7–4 | Alay | 4-1 | 3-3 |

=== Final ===
| Team 1 | Score | Team 2 |
|---|---|---|
| Neftchi Kochkor-Ata | 0–1 | Abdish-Ata Kant |
