= 2013 Kyrgyzstan Cup =

2013 edition of the Kyrgyzstan Cup, a football competition in Kyrgyzstan

- 2013

Tournament information

Final positions
- Champions: Alay Osh

The 2013 edition of the Kyrgyzstan Cup was the annual Kyrgyzstan football competition between domestic clubs.

== Play-off round ==
=== 1/16 Round ===
The 1/16 round matches were played on 7, 8, 9 and 11 June 2013.

| Team 1 | Score | Team 2 |
|---|---|---|
| Djeyti Atletik | 1–2 | Zhivoye Pivo |
| Belovodsk | 1–2 | Vetka |
| Asil | 2–1 | Energetik |
| FK Aldiyer (Kurshab) | 5–1 | FK Ak-Zhol (Aravan) |
| RUOR-97 | w/o | FK Khimik Kara-Balta |
| Talas | 0–1 | FK Ala-Too-2 Naryn |
| FK Dordoi-2 Bishkek | 3-3 (pen4-5) | FK Alga-2 (Bishkek) |

=== 1/8 round ===
The 1/8 round matches were played on 2, 3 and 4 July 2013.

| Team 1 | Score | Team 2 |
|---|---|---|
| FK Dordoi Bishkek | 3-0 | Vetka |
| FK Alga-2 (Bishkek) | w/o | Manas (Talas) |
| FK Aldiyer (Kurshab) | 0-1 | DSK Neftchi (Kochkor-Ata) |
| Asil | 0-2 | FK Alay (Osh) |
| RUOR-97 | 0-6 | FK Alga (Bishkek) |
| Zhivoye Pivo | 0-1 | FK Ala-Too Naryn |
| FK Ala-Too-2 Naryn | 0-7 | FK Abdysh-Ata (Kant) |
| FK Nashe Pivo (Kant) | w/o | Yssik-Kol (Karakol) |

=== 1/4 Round ===
The 1/4 round matches were played on 23 July 2013.

| Team 1 | Score | Team 2 |
|---|---|---|
| FK Nashe Pivo (Kant) | 1-4 | FK Dordoi Bishkek |
| FK Alga-2 (Bishkek) | 2-8 | FK Abdysh-Ata (Kant) |
| FK Alay (Osh) | 2-0 | DSK Neftchi (Kochkor-Ata) |
| FK Ala-Too Naryn | 1-2 | FK Alga (Bishkek) |

=== 1/2 Round ===
The 1/2 round matches were played 1st leg on 17-18 August and 2nd leg on 21-24 August 2013.

| Team 1 | Agg. | Team 2 | 1st leg | 2nd leg |
|---|---|---|---|---|
| FK Abdysh-Ata (Kant) | 1-3 | FK Dordoi Bishkek | 1-2 | 0-1 |
| FK Alga (Bishkek) | 1-3 | FK Alay (Osh) | 1-2 | 0-1 |

=== Final ===
The final was played on 31 August 2013.

| Team 1 | Score | Team 2 |
|---|---|---|
| FK Alay (Osh) | 1-1 (pen4-2) | FK Dordoi Bishkek |
