= Amanbek Manybekov =

Kyrgyzstani footballer

Personal information
- Date of birth: August 6, 1995 (age 31)
- Place of birth: Kyrgyzstan
- Position: Defender

Team information
- Current team: Asiagoal Bishkek
- Number: 19

Senior career*
Years	Team	Apps	(Gls)
2016-2019	FC Abdysh-Ata Kant		
2019	FC Alga Bishkek	88	(1)
Total		88	(1)

International career
2016	Kyrgyzstan	3	(0)
- * Club domestic league appearances and goals

Amanbek Manybekov (Russian: Аманбек Маныбеков, born 6 August 1995) is a Kyrgyz professional footballer who currently plays for Asiagoal Bishkek.

The adaptable defender made his national team debut in the starting eleven against Turkmenistan.
