= FC Ata-Spor Bishkek =

Kyrgyz football club

Ata-Spor Bishkek
- Full name: FC Ata-Spor Bishkek
- Founded: 2008; 17 years ago
- Ground: Bishkek, Kyrgyzstan
- League: Kyrgyzstan League
- 2009: 9th

FC Ata-Spor Bishkek is a Kyrgyzstani football club based in Bishkek, Kyrgyzstan that played in the top division in Kyrgyzstan, the Kyrgyzstan League.

== History ==
- 2008: Founded as FC Ata-Spor Bishkek.

== Achievements ==
Kyrgyzstan League:

- 9th: 2009

Kyrgyzstan Cup:
