= FC Kolos Nizhnechuyskoye =

Kyrgyz football club

Kolos Nizhnechuyskoye
- Full name: FC Kolos Nizhnechuyskoye
- Ground: Nizhnechuyskoye
- League: Kyrgyzstan League
- 1995: 8th

FC Kolos Nizhnechuyskoye is a Kyrgyzstani football club based in the village of Nizhnechuyskoye, Chuy Region, that last played in the top division Kyrgyzstan League.

== Achievements ==
Kyrgyzstan League:

- 8th place: 1995 (Promotion/relegation play off: Northern Zone)

Kyrgyzstan Cup:

- 1/4 finals: 1996
