= FC Bakit Mailuu-Suu =

Kyrgyz football club

Bakit Mailuu-Suu
- Full name: FC Bakit Mailuu-Suu
- Ground: Mailuu-Suu, Kyrgyzstan
- League: Kyrgyzstan League
- 1998: 10th, Zone B

FC Bakit Mailuu-Suu is a Kyrgyzstani football club based in Mailuu-Suu that plays in the top division in Kyrgyzstan, the Kyrgyzstan League.

== History ==
- 1997: Founded as FC Alga Mailuu-Suu.
- 1998: Renamed to FC Svetotekhnika Mailuu-Suu.
- 2007: Renamed to FC Mailuu-Suu.
- 2008: Renamed to FC Bakit Mailuu-Suu.

== Achievements ==
- Kyrgyzstan League:
- 10th place, Zone B: 1998

Kyrgyzstan Cup:

- Quarter finals: 1998, 1999, 2001
