= FC Energetik Bishkek =

Kyrgyz football club

Energetik Bishkek
- Full name: FC Energetik Bishkek
- Ground: Bishkek, Kyrgyzstan
- League: Kyrgyzstan League
- 1995: 4th

FC Energetik Bishkek is a Kyrgyzstani football club based in Bishkek, Kyrgyzstan that played in the top division in Kyrgyzstan, the Kyrgyzstan League.

== History ==
- 19??: Founded as FC Energetik Bishkek.

== Achievements ==
Kyrgyzstan League:

- 4th place: 1995 (Promotion/relegation play Off: Northern Zone)

Kyrgyzstan Cup:

- 1/16 finals: 1996, 1998
