= FC Dinamo Kant =

Kyrgyz football club

Dinamo Kant
- Full name: FC Dinamo Kant
- Ground: Kant, Kyrgyzstan
- League: Kyrgyzstan League
- 1998: 8th, Zone A

FC Dinamo Kant is a Kyrgyzstani football club based in Kant that plays in the top division in Kyrgyzstan, the Kyrgyzstan League.

== History ==
- 1997: Founded as FC Dinamo Kant.
- 1998: Dissolved.

== Achievements ==
- Kyrgyzstan League:
- 8th place, Zone A: 1998

Kyrgyzstan Cup:
