= FC Bazar-Korgon-Babur =

Kyrgyz football club

Bazar-Korgon-Babur
- Full name: FC Bazar-Korgon-Babur
- Ground: Bazar-Korgon, Kyrgyzstan
- League: Kyrgyzstan League
- 1998: 11th, Zone B

FC Bazar-Korgon-Babur is a football club based in Bazar-Korgon that played in the Kyrgyzstan League, the top division in Kyrgyzstan, in 2017 and 2008.

== History ==
- 1995: Founded as FC Navruz Bazar-Korgon.
- 1997: Renamed as FC Bazar-Korgon-Babur.

== Achievements ==
Kyrgyzstan League:

- 11th place, Zone B: 1998

Kyrgyzstan Cup:
