= FC Dzhalal-Abad =

Kyrgyz football club

- Full name: FC Dzhalal-Abad
- Founded: 1969
- Ground: Dzhalal-Abad, Kyrgyzstan
- Capacity: 7,000
- League: Kyrgyzstan League
- 2009: 7th

FC Dzhalal-Abad is a Kyrgyzstani football club based in Jalal-Abad, Kyrgyzstan that played in the top division in Kyrgyzstan, the Kyrgyzstan League.

== History ==
- 1969: Founded as FC Stroitel Dzhalal-Abad.
- 1990: Renamed to FC Khimik Dzhalal-Abad.
- 1992: Renamed to FC Kokart Dzhalal-Abad.
- 1996: Renamed to FC Dzhalal-Abad.
- 1997: Renamed to FC Dinamo Dzhalal-Abad.
- 1998: Renamed to FC Dzhalal-Abad.
- 1999: Renamed to FC Dinamo Dzhalal-Abad.
- 2000: Renamed to FC Dinamo-KPK Dzhalal-Abad.
- 2002: Renamed to FC Dzhalal-Abad.
- 2003: Renamed to FC Doma Ata Dzhalal-Abad.
- 2003: Dissolved.
- 2004: Renamed to FC Dzhalal-Abad.
- 2005: Renamed to FC Asyl Dzhalal-Abad.
- 2006: Renamed to FC Dzhalal-Abad.
- 2008: Renamed to FC Nashe Pivo Dzhalal-Abad.
- 2009: Renamed to FC Kambar-Ata Dzhalal-Abad.
- 2009: Dissolved.
- 2013: Renamed to FC Asyl Dzhalal-Abad.
- 2015: Renamed to FC Dzhalal-Abad.
