= FC Kelechek Osh =

Kyrgyz football club

Kelechek Osh
- Full name: FC Kelechek Osh
- Ground: Osh, Kyrgyzstan
- League: Kyrgyzstan League
- 2003: 6th

FC Kelechek Osh is a Kyrgyzstani football club based in Osh that plays in the top division the Kyrgyzstan League.

== Achievements ==
Kyrgyzstan League:

- 6th place, group B: 2003

Kyrgyzstan Cup:
