= FC Abdysh-Ata-99 =

Kyrgyz football club

Abdysh-Ata-99
- Full name: Football Club Abdysh-Ata-99 Kant
- Founded: 2000; 26 years ago
- Ground: Stadion Sportkompleks Abdysh-Ata; Kant, Kyrgyzstan
- Capacity: 2,000
- League: Kyrgyzstan League
- 2008: 9th

Abdysh-Ata-99 (Футбол клубу "Абдыш-Ата-99" Кант) was a professional football club based in Kant, Kyrgyzstan. It was named after a local brewery. The club was founded in 2000.

== History ==
- 2006: Founded as Abdysh-Ata-FShM Kant
- 2008: Renamed to FC Abdysh-Ata-91 Kant
- 2010: Renamed to FC Abdysh-Ata-94 Kant
- 2016: Renamed to FC Abdysh-Ata-99 Kant

== See also ==
- FC Abdysh-Ata
