= FC Energetik Karaköl =

Kyrgyz football club

Energetik Karaköl
- Full name: FC Energetik Karaköl
- Ground: Karaköl, Kyrgyzstan
- League: Kyrgyzstan League
- 1999: 10th

FC Energetik Karaköl is a Kyrgyzstani football club based in Karaköl, Kyrgyzstan that played in the top division in Kyrgyzstan, the Kyrgyzstan League.

== Achievements ==
Kyrgyzstan League:

- 10th place: 1999

Kyrgyzstan Cup:
