= FC Alga-2 Bishkek =

Kyrgyz football club

Alga-2 Bishkek
- Full name: FC Alga-2 Bishkek
- Ground: Bishkek, Kyrgyzstan
- League: Kyrgyzstan First League
- 2016: 4th

FC Alga-2 Bishkek is a Kyrgyzstani football club based in Bishkek, Kyrgyzstan that played in the first division in Kyrgyzstan, the Kyrgyzstan First League.

== History ==
- 19??: Founded as FC Alga-d Frunze.
- 1993: Renamed FC Alga Bishkek.
- 1994: Merged with FC Alga-RIIF Bishkek to FC Alga Bishkek.
- 1994: Renamed FC Alga-2 Bishkek.

== Achievements ==
Kyrgyzstan League:

- 5th: 1993

Kyrgyzstan Cup:
