= FC Olimpia-85 Bishkek =

Kyrgyz football club

Olimpia-85 Bishkek
- Full name: FC Olimpia-85 Bishkek
- Ground: Bishkek, Kyrgyzstan
- League: Kyrgyzstan League
- 2003: 9th

FC Olimpia-85 Bishkek is a Kyrgyzstani football club based in Bishkek, Kyrgyzstan that played in the top division in Kyrgyzstan, the Kyrgyzstan League.

== History ==
- 1985: Founded as FC Olimpia-85 Bishkek.

== Achievements ==
Kyrgyzstan League:

- 9th place, group B: 2003
