= FC Talas =

Kyrgyz football club

Talas
- Full name: Football Club Talas
- Ground: Zhashtyk Stadion; Talas, Kyrgyzstan
- Capacity: 10,000
- League: Kyrgyzstan League
- 2003: 11th

FC Talas was a Kyrgyzstani football club based in Talas, that played in the top domestic division, the Kyrgyzstan League. The club played its home games at Zhashtyk Stadion.

== Name history ==
- 1992: Founded as Manas Talas
- 1993: FC Talas
- 1994: Manas Talas
- 1997: Manas-Dinamo Talas
- 1998: Manas Talas
- 1999: Boo-Terek Talas
- 2000: Manas-Dinamo Talas
- 2003: Manas-Ordo Talas
- 2006: FC Talas
- 2007: Shadikan Talas
- 2008: Dzheruy-Altyn Talas
- 2012: FC Talas
- 2013: Dissolved
- 2016: Refounded as FC Talas

== See also ==
- Football in Kyrgyzstan
- List of football clubs in Kyrgyzstan
- FC Namys-APK Talas
