= Stadion Sportkompleks Abdysh-Ata =

Coordinates: 42°53′07″N 74°52′05″E

Stadion Sportkompleks Abdysh-Ata is a multi-purpose stadium in Kant, Kyrgyzstan. It is used mostly for football matches and serves as the home stadium for Abdysh-Ata Kant of the Kyrgyzstan League, and their farm club FC Nashe Pivo. It was also used by FC Abdysh-Ata-99. The stadium has a capacity of 2,000 people.
