= FC Ala-Buka =

Kyrgyz football club

- Full name: FC Ala-Buka
- Ground: Ala-Buka, Kyrgyzstan
- League: Kyrgyzstan League
- 1999: 11th

FC Ala-Buka is a Kyrgyzstani football club based in Ala-Buka that plays in the top division the Kyrgyzstan League.

== History ==
- 19??: Founded as FC Dinamo Ala-Buka.
- 1999: Dissolved
- 2016: Refounded as FC Ala-Buka.

== Achievements ==
Kyrgyzstan League:

- 6th place: 1998

Kyrgyzstan Cup:
