= FC Shoro Bishkek =

Kyrgyz football club

Shoro Bishkek
- Full name: FC Shoro Bishkek
- Ground: Bishkek, Kyrgyzstan
- League: Kyrgyzstan League
- 2004: 9th

FC Shoro Bishkek is a Kyrgyzstani football club based in Bishkek, Kyrgyzstan that played in the top division in Kyrgyzstan, the Kyrgyzstan League.

== History ==
- 2003: Founded as FC Shoro Bishkek.
- 2004: Dissolved after 18 round (Club merged to SKA-Shoro Bishkek in summer 2004).

== Achievements ==
Kyrgyzstan League: 3

- 4th place: 2003

Kyrgyzstan Cup:
