= Kyrgyzstan Time =

Time zone of Kyrgyzstan, UTC plus 6 hours

Kyrgyzstan Time (KGT)is the time zone of Kyrgyzstan. It is +6:00 hrs ahead of Universal Coordinated Time (UTC+06:00). Kyrgyzstan does not observe daylight saving time.

== IANA time zone database ==
Data for Kyrgyzstan directly from zone.tab of the IANA time zone database. Columns marked with * are the columns from zone.tab itself.

c.c.*	Coordinates*	TZ*	Comments*	UTC offset
KG	+4254+07436	Asia/Bishkek		+06:00

== History ==
Historic time zones for Kyrgyzstan (both as an independent country and as part of the Soviet Union)

From	To	Zone	DST
2 May 1924	21 June 1930	UTC+05:00	No
21 June 1930	1 April 1981	UTC+06:00	No
1 April 1981	31 March 1991	UTC+06:00	Yes
31 March 1991	12 August 2005	UTC+05:00	Yes
12 August 2005	Present	UTC+06:00	No
