= FC Polyot Bishkek =

Kyrgyz football club

Polyot Bishkek
- Full name: FC Polyot Bishkek
- Ground: Bishkek, Kyrgyzstan
- League: Kyrgyzstan League
- 2000: 3rd

FC Polyot Bishkek is a Kyrgyzstani football club based in Bishkek, Kyrgyzstan that played in the top division in Kyrgyzstan, the Kyrgyzstan League.

== History ==
- 1997: Founded as SC Sverdlovskogo RUVD Bishkek.
- 1999: Renamed FC Polyot Bishkek.
- 2003: Renamed with Dinamo-Erkin Farm Bishkek to FC Dinamo-Polyot Bishkek.

== Achievements ==
Kyrgyzstan League:

- 3rd: 2000
