= FC Uchkun Kara-Suu =

Kyrgyz football club

Uchkun Kara-Suu
- Full name: FC Uchkun Kara-Suu
- Ground: Tsentral'nyi Stadion; Kara-Suu, Kyrgyzstan
- Capacity: 6,000
- League: Kyrgyzstan League
- 1994: 12th

FC Uchkun Kara-Suu is a Kyrgyz football club based in Kara-Suu, Kyrgyzstan that played in the top division in Kyrgyzstan, the Kyrgyzstan League.

== History ==
- 199?: Founded as FC Uchkun Kara-Suu.

== Achievements ==
Kyrgyzstan League:

- 12th place: 1994

Kyrgyzstan Cup:
