= FC Metallurg Kadamjay =

Kyrgyz football club

Home colours	Away colours

FC Metallurg Kadamjay is a Kyrgyzstani football (soccer) club from Kadamjai. They have won one national championship, in 1996.

== Achievements ==
Kyrgyzstan League: 1

- Winner: 1996

Kyrgyzstan Cup: 1

- Finalist: 1996

== Performance in AFC competitions ==
- Asian Club Championship: 1 appearance

1998: First Round
