= FC Shakhtyor Tashkömür =

Kyrgyz football club

Shakhtyor Tashkömür
- Full name: FC Shakhtyor Tashkömür
- Ground: Tashkömür, Kyrgyzstan
- League: Kyrgyzstan League
- 1994: 13th

FC Shakhtyor Tashkömür is a Kyrgyzstani football club based in Tashkömür, Kyrgyzstan that played in the top division in Kyrgyzstan, the Kyrgyzstan League.

== History ==
- 19??: Founded as FC Shakhtyor Tashkömür.
- 2011: Renamed to FC Tashkömür.
- 2012: Renamed to FC Shakhtyor Tashkömür.

== Achievements ==
Kyrgyzstan League:

- 13th place: 1994

Kyrgyzstan Cup:

- quarterfinals: 2001
