= FC Neftchi Kochkor-Ata =

Kyrgyz football club

Neftchi Kochkor-Ata Neftçi Qoçqor-Ata
- Full name: Football Club Neftchi Kochkor-Ata; Нефтчи Кочкор-Ата Футбол Клубу
- Founded: 1960; 66 years ago
- Ground: Zhalal-Abad Kurmanbek Stadion
- Capacity: 4,500
- Manager: Aleksandr Mochinov
- League: Kyrgyz Premier League
- 2025: KPL, 9th of 14
| Home colours | Away colours |

Football Club Neftchi Kochkor-Ata (Kyrgyz: Нефтчи Кочкор-Ата Футбол Клубу, romanized: Neftçi Qoçqor-Ata Futbol Klubu) is a Kyrgyz professional football club based in Kochkor-Ata. Founded in 1960, the club competes in the Kyrgyz Premier League.

== History ==
=== Domestic ===
| Season | League | | | | | | | | | Kyrgyzstan Cup | Top goalscorer | |
| Season | Div. | Pos. | Pl. | W | D | L | GS | GA | P | Kyrgyzstan Cup | Name | League |
|---|---|---|---|---|---|---|---|---|---|---|---|---|
| 1994 | 1st | 11 | 26 | 3 | 5 | 18 | 23 | 84 | 11 | | | |
| 1995 | 1st | 6 | 14 | 4 | 3 | 7 | 12 | 23 | 15 | | | |
| 1996 | 1st | 10 | 22 | 6 | 3 | 13 | 22 | 40 | 21 | | | |
| 1997 | 1st | 9 | 18 | 2 | 4 | 12 | 13 | 57 | 10 | | | |
| 1998 | 1st | 12 | 22 | 3 | 3 | 16 | 21 | 61 | 12 | | | |
| 2003 | 1st | 5 | 12 | 3 | 1 | 8 | 13 | 41 | 10 | | | |
| 2004 | 1st | 8 | 36 | 9 | 2 | 25 | 30 | 87 | 29 | | | |
| 2007 | 1st | 6 | 32 | 12 | 6 | 14 | 36 | 30 | 42 | | | |
| 2010 | 1st | 1 | 20 | 12 | 7 | 1 | 36 | 14 | 43 | Runners-up | | |
| 2011 | 1st | 2 | 20 | 12 | 5 | 3 | 32 | 14 | 41 | Runners-up | Ruslan Jamshidov | 7 |
| 2013 | 1st | 6 | 20 | 9 | 3 | 8 | 29 | 24 | 30 | Quarterfinal | | |
| 2014 | 1st | 6 | 20 | 6 | 2 | 12 | 11 | 39 | 10 | | | |
| 2018 | 1st | 4 | 28 | 14 | 5 | 9 | 47 | 40 | 47 | Quartfinal | Otabek Khaidarov; Umidullo Iminov | 9 |
| 2019 | 1st | 4 | 28 | 14 | 4 | 10 | 43 | 31 | 46 | Winners | | |
| 2020 | 1st | 3 | 14 | 9 | 1 | 3 | 27 | 15 | 28 | Semifinal | Eldar Moldozhunusov | 6 |
| 2021 | 1st | 6 | 28 | 9 | 4 | 15 | 37 | 44 | 31 | Winners | Amredin Sharifi | 12 |
| 2022 | 1st | 5 | 27 | 12 | 7 | 8 | 42 | 28 | 43 | Runners Up | Eldar Moldozhunusov | 13 |
| 2023 | 1st | 7 | 27 | 9 | 5 | 13 | 29 | 38 | 32 | Quarter-finals | Eldar Moldozhunusov | 8 |
| 2024 | 1st | 5 | 27 | 8 | 7 | 12 | 36 | 40 | 31 | Semi-finals | Amredin Sharifi | 6 |
| 2025 | 1st | 9 | 26 | 7 | 5 | 14 | 33 | 40 | 26 | Did not qualify | Eldar Moldozhunusov | 9 |
| 2026 | 1st | TBD | 30 | | | | | | 0 | TBD | | |

=== Continental history ===
As of match played 30 June 2022

| Competition | Pld | W | D | L | GF | GA |
|---|---|---|---|---|---|---|
| AFC President's Cup | 5 | 4 | 0 | 1 | 13 | 5 |
| AFC Cup | 5 | 1 | 1 | 3 | 1 | 6 |
| Total | 10 | 5 | 1 | 4 | 14 | 11 |

| Season | Competition | Round | Opponent | Home | Away | Aggregate |
|---|---|---|---|---|---|---|
| 2011 | AFC President's Cup | Group A | (Bangladesh) Abahani Limited Dhaka | 2–0 | | 1st |
| 2011 | AFC President's Cup | Group A | (Sri Lanka) Don Bosco | 2–0 | | 1st |
| 2011 | AFC President's Cup | Group A | (Cambodia) Phnom Penh Crown | 1–0 | | 1st |
| 2011 | AFC President's Cup | Final Stage; Group A | (Cambodia) Phnom Penh Crown | 0–3 | | 2nd |
| 2011 | AFC President's Cup | Final Stage; Group A | (Myanmar) Yadanarbon | 8–2 | | 2nd |
| 2020 | AFC Cup | Play-off | (Tajikistan) Khujand | 1–0 | 0–3 | 1–3 |
| 2022 | AFC Cup | Group E | (Uzbekistan) Sogdiana Jizzakh | 0–2 | | 4th |
| 2022 | AFC Cup | Group E | (Turkmenistan) Altyn Asyr | 0–1 | | 4th |
| 2022 | AFC Cup | Group E | (Tajikistan) CSKA Pamir Dushanbe | 0–0 | | 4th |

== Honours ==
- Kyrgyzstan League
  - Champions (1): 2010
- Kyrgyzstan Cup
  - Champions (3): 2019, 2021, 2026
- Super Cup
  - Champions (1): 2010

== Current squad ==
As of 2 April, 2026

Note: Flags indicate national team as defined under FIFA eligibility rules; some limited exceptions apply. Players may hold more than one non-FIFA nationality.

| No. | Pos. | Nation | Player |
|---|---|---|---|
| 1 | GK | KGZ | Melis Tashtanov |
| 2 | DF | UZB | Sardorbek Khursandov |
| 3 | DF | AUS | Alex Baker |
| 4 | DF | UKR | Valeriy Stepanenko |
| 5 | MF | UZB | Sarvar Ablaev |
| 7 | FW | GEO | Mikheil Ergemlidze |
| 8 | MF | UZB | Sobit Sindarov |
| 9 | FW | KGZ | Dastanbek Toktosunov |
| 10 | MF | KGZ | Manas Karipov |
| 11 | FW | KGZ | Eldar Tashtemirov |
| 14 | MF | UZB | Dadakhon Yusupov |
| 17 | FW | UZB | Javokhir Alizhonov |

| No. | Pos. | Nation | Player |
|---|---|---|---|
| 19 | DF | KGZ | Abrorbek Askarov |
| 20 | FW | KGZ | Bayaman Subanaliev |
| 21 | DF | KGZ | Almazbek Malikov |
| 22 | MF | KGZ | Sultanbek Momunov |
| 23 | MF | KGZ | Timurlan Nurmatov |
| 27 | DF | KGZ | Akram Umarov |
| 30 | DF | JPN | Haruki Yamamura |
| 33 | MF | GEO | Nikoloz Basheleishvili |
| 45 | DF | KGZ | Doniyorbek Makhmudov |
| 83 | GK | KGZ | Uson Mamatkadyrov |
| 88 | DF | RUS | Yuriy Gavrilov |
| 97 | GK | BLR | Artem Bely |
