= FC Ekolog Bishkek =

Kyrgyz football club

Ekolog Bishkek
- Full name: FC Ekolog Bishkek
- Ground: Bishkek, Kyrgyzstan
- League: Kyrgyzstan League
- 2001: 7th

FC Ekolog Bishkek is a Kyrgyzstani football club based in Bishkek, Kyrgyzstan that played in the top division in Kyrgyzstan, the Kyrgyzstan League.

== History ==
- 19??: Founded as FC Ekolog Bishkek.

== Achievements ==
Kyrgyzstan League:

- 7th place: 2001

Kyrgyzstan Cup:
