= FC Instrumentalshchik Bishkek =

Kyrgyz football club

Instrumentalshchik Bishkek
- Full name: Football Club Instrumentalshchik Bishkek
- Ground: Bishkek, Kyrgyzstan
- League: Kyrgyzstan League
- 1993: 11th

FC Instrumentalshchik Bishkek was a Kyrgyzstani football club based in Bishkek, that played in the top domestic division, the Kyrgyzstan League.

== Name history ==
- 1958: Founded as Instrumentalshchik Frunze
- 1992: Instrumentalshchik Bishkek
- 1994: Merged with Selmashevets Bishkek to Rotor Bishkek
