= FC Kant-Oil =

Kant-Oil
- Full name: FC Kant-Oil
- Founded: 1993
- Ground: Stadion Sportkompleks Abdysh-Ata; Kant, Kyrgyzstan
- Capacity: 3,000
- League: Kyrgyzstan League
- 1995: 1st

FC Kant-Oil was a Kyrgyzstani football club based in Kant, Kyrgyzstan.

== History ==
- 1993: Founded as FC Han-Tengri Kant.
- 1994: Renamed FC Kant-Oil.
- 1996: Dissolved.

After the 1996 season, Kant-Oil were disbanded.

== Achievements ==
- Kyrgyzstan League:
- Champion: 1994, 1995

Kyrgyzstan Cup:

- Semi-finalist: 1994
