= FC Belovodskoye =

Kyrgyz football club

Belovodskoye
- Full name: Football Club Belovodskoye
- Founded: 1993
- Ground: Belovodskoye, Kyrgyzstan
- League: Kyrgyzstan League

FC Belovodskoye is a Kyrgyz football club based in Belovodskoye, that played in the Kyrgyzstan League. From 2006 to 2010 it was a farm club of FC Abdish-Ata Kant.

== History ==
- 1993: Founded as FC Maksat Belovodskoye
- 1999: Renamed to FC DinamoBelovodskoye
- 2003: Renamed to FC Maksat Belovodskoye
- 2006: Renamed to FC Pivo Belovodskoye
- 2011: Renamed to FC Khimik Belovodskoye
- 2013: Renamed to FC Belovodskoye
