= FC Dinamo-Manas-SKIF Bishkek =

Kyrgyz football club

Dinamo-Manas-SKIF Bishkek
- Full name: Football Club Dinamo-Manas-SKIF Bishkek
- Ground: Dynamo Stadion; Bishkek, Kyrgyzstan
- Capacity: 10,000
- League: Kyrgyzstan League
- 2000: 7th

FC Dinamo-Manas-SKIF Bishkek was a Kyrgyz professional football club based in Bishkek, that competed in the Kyrgyzstan League. The club played its home games at Dynamo Stadion.

== Name history ==
- 1993: Founded as Shumkar-SKIF Bishkek
- 1995: Shumkar Bishkek
- 1996: Shumkar-Dastan Bishkek
- 2000: Dinamo-Manas-SKIF Bishkek

== See also ==
- Dinamo MVD Bishkek
