= FC Rotor Bishkek =

Kyrgyz football club

Rotor Bishkek
- Full name: Football Club Rotor Bishkek
- Ground: Bishkek, Kyrgyzstan
- League: Kyrgyzstan League
- 1996: 6th

FC Rotor Bishkek was a Kyrgyzstani football club based in Bishkek, that played in the top domestic division, the Kyrgyzstan League.

== Name history ==
- Founded as Torpedo Frunze
- 1960: Selmashevets Frunze
- 1992: Selmashevets Bishkek
- 1994: Merged with Instrumentalschik Bishkek to Rotor Bishkek
