= FC SKA-Alay Osh =

Kyrgyz football club

SKA-Alay Osh
- Full name: FC SKA-Alay Osh
- Ground: Osh, Kyrgyzstan
- League: Kyrgyzstan League
- 1998: 2nd, Zone B

FC SKA-Alay Osh is a Kyrgyzstani football club based in Osh that plays in the top division the Kyrgyzstan League.

== History ==
- 19??: Founded as FC Alay Gulcha.
- 1994: Renamed FC Alay-Oshpirim Gulcha.
- 1995: Renamed FC Alay Gulcha.
- 1998: Renamed FC SKA-Alay Osh.

== Achievements ==
- Kyrgyzstan League:
  - 5th place: 1996
