= FC Dinamo-UVD Osh =

Kyrgyz football club

Dinamo-UVD Osh
- Full name: FC Dinamo-UVD Osh
- Ground: Osh, Kyrgyzstan
- League: Kyrgyzstan League
- 2003: 6th

FC Dinamo-UVD Osh is a Kyrgyzstani football club based in Osh that plays in the top division the Kyrgyzstan League. Founded in 1993

== History ==
- 1993: Founded as FC Dinamo Osh.
- 1996: Merged with Alay Osh to FC Dinamo-Alay Osh.
- 2002: Renamed as Dinamo-UVD Osh.

== Achievements ==
Kyrgyzstan League:

- 3rd place: 1996

Kyrgyzstan Cup:

- Finalist: 1997, 1998, 2000
