= FC Ak-Maral Tokmok =

Kyrgyz football club

Ak-Maral Tokmok
- Full name: FC Ak-Maral Tokmok
- Founded: 1993
- Ground: Tokmok, Kyrgyzstan
- League: Kyrgyzstan League
- 1995: 6th

FC Ak-Maral Tokmok was a Kyrgyzstani football club based in Tokmok, Kyrgyzstan that played in the top division in Kyrgyzstan, the Kyrgyzstan League.

== History ==
- 1992: Founded as FC Spartak Tokmok.
- 1993: Renamed FC Ak-Maral Tokmok.
- 1995: Dissolved.

== Achievements ==
Kyrgyzstan League:

- Runner-up: 1993

Kyrgyzstan Cup:

- Winner: 1994
