= FC Orto-Nur Sokuluk =

Kyrgyz football club

Orto-Nur Sokuluk
- Full name: FC Orto-Nur Sokuluk
- Ground: Sokuluk, Kyrgyzstan
- League: Kyrgyzstan League
- 2003: 8th

FC Orto-Nur Sokuluk is a Kyrgyzstani football club based in Sokuluk, Kyrgyzstan that played in the top division in Kyrgyzstan, the Kyrgyzstan League.

== History ==
- 1990: Founded as FC Dostuk Sokuluk.
- 1992: Renamed FC SKA-Dostuk Sokuluk.
- 1998: Renamed FC Dinamo Sokuluk.
- 1999: Renamed FC Frunze Sokuluk.
- 2003: Renamed FC Orto-Nur Sokuluk.
- 2004: Dissolved.

== Achievements ==
Kyrgyzstan League:

- Runner-up: 1992
