= FC Lokomotiv Dzhalal-Abad =

Kyrgyz football club

Lokomotiv Dzhalal-Abad
- Full name: FC Lokomotiv Dzhalal-Abad
- Founded: 2007
- Ground: Dzhalal-Abad, Kyrgyzstan
- League: Kyrgyzstan League
- 2007: 4th

FC Lokomotiv Dzhalal-Abad is a Kyrgyzstani football club based in Jalal-Abad, Kyrgyzstan that played in the top division in Kyrgyzstan, the Kyrgyzstan League.

== History ==
- 2007: Founded as FC Lokomotiv Dzhalal-Abad.
- 2008: Dissolved.

== Achievements ==
- Kyrgyzstan Cup
  - Runners-up (1): 2007
