= FC RUOR-Guardia Bishkek =

Kyrgyz football club

RUOR-Guardia Bishkek
- Full name: Football Club RUOR-Guardia Bishkek
- Ground: Bishkek, Kyrgyzstan
- League: Kyrgyzstan League
- 2005: 6th
Home colours	Away colours

FC RUOR-Guardia Bishkek was a football club based in Bishkek, Kyrgyzstan that played in the top domestic division, the Kyrgyzstan League.

== Name history ==
- 1994: Founded as AiK Bishkek
- 1998: National Guard-AiK Bishkek
- 1998: National Guard Bishkek
- 1999: SKNG Guardia Bishkek
- 2001: RUOR-Guardia Bishkek

== Achievements ==
- Kyrgyzstan League
  - 3rd place: 1998
- Kyrgyzstan Cup
  - Winner: 1996
