= FC Zhashtyk-Ak-Altyn Kara-Suu =

Kyrgyz football club

Zhashtyk-Ak-Altyn Kara-Suu
- Full name: FC Zhashtyk-Ak-Altyn Kara-Suu
- Ground: Tsentral'nyi Stadion; Kara-Suu, Kyrgyzstan
- Capacity: 6,000
- League: Kyrgyzstan League
- 2007/08: 6th
Home colours	Away colours

FC Zhashtyk-Ak-Altyn Kara-Suu is a Kyrgyz professional football club based in Kara-Suu. They are the only club in football history to appear in six straight cup finals and lose all of them. They are also one of two clubs in the world to lose all 7 national cup finals that they attended without winning a cup ever. Their name means white-gold youth of Kara-Suu, Kara-Suu meaning black water.

== History ==
- 1993: Founded as FC Aka-Atyn Kara-Suu.
- 1994: Renamed FC Ak-Altyn Kara-Suu.
- 1998: Renamed to FC Zhashtyk-Ak-Altyn Kara-Suu after merger with FC Zhashtyk Osh.

== Current squad ==
Note: Flags indicate national team as defined under FIFA eligibility rules; some limited exceptions apply. Players may hold more than one non-FIFA nationality.

No.	Pos.	Nation	Player
—	DF	(Kyrgyzstan) KGZ	Ulugbek Riskulov
—	MF	(Kyrgyzstan) KGZ	Vitaly Timofeev
—	FW	(Kyrgyzstan) KGZ	Yevgeniy Boldygin

== Achievements ==
- Kyrgyzstan League
  - Champions (1): 2003
- Kyrgyzstan Cup
  - Runners-up (7): 2001, 2002, 2003, 2004, 2005, 2006, 2008

FC Zhastyk hold the world record for the most consecutive losing appearances in a national football cup final. The first five of these losses were all by 0–1 (the sixth by 0–4); the first three against SKA-PVO Bishkek and the last three against Dordoi-Dinamo Naryn. Prior to their 'feat', this record was shared by USM Alger, who appeared in five consecutive Algerian cup finals from 1969 to 1973 and lost all of them, and Al-Ramtha, who did the same in Jordan from 1993 to 1997.

== Performance in AFC competitions ==
- AFC Champions League: 1 appearance

2002–03: Qualifying West – 2nd Round
