= FC Shakhtyor Kyzyl-Kiya =

Kyrgyz football club

Bistao Batken
- Full name: FC Bishtao Batken
- Nickname: Merkits
- Founded: 2014
- Stadium: Tashmedia
- Capacity: 1,000
- League: Kyrgyzstan League

FC Shakhtyor Kyzyl-Kiya is a Kyrgyzstani football club based in Kyzyl-Kiya, Kyrgyzstan that played in the top division in Kyrgyzstan, the Kyrgyzstan League.

== History ==
- 1992: Founded as FC Semetey Kyzyl-Kiya.
- 1997: Renamed FC Semetey-Dinamo Kyzyl-Kiya.
- 1998: Renamed FC Semetey Kyzyl-Kiya.
- 2001: Renamed FC Kyzyl-Kiya.
- 2006: Renamed FC Shakhtyor Kyzyl-Kiya.

== Achievements ==
Kyrgyzstan League:

- 2nd place: 1994
- 3nd place: 1995

Kyrgyzstan Cup:

- Winner: 1995
- Finalist: 1999
