= FC Dinamo MVD Bishkek =

Kyrgyz football club

Dinamo MVD Bishkek
- Full name: Football Club Dinamo MVD Bishkek
- Ground: Dynamo Stadion; Bishkek, Kyrgyzstan
- Capacity: 10,000
- League: Kyrgyzstan League
- 2002: 5th

FC Dinamo MVD Bishkek was a Kyrgyzstani football club based in Bishkek, that played in the top domestic division, the Kyrgyzstan League. The club played its home games at Dynamo Stadion.

== Name history ==
- 1930's: Founded as Dinamo Frunze
- 1992: Dinamo Bishkek
- 1996: Dinamo-Oil Bishkek
- 1997: Dinamo Bishkek
- 1998: CAG-Dinamo-MVD Bishkek
- 2001: Erkin Farm Bishkek
- 2002: Dinamo-Erkin Farm Bishkek
- 2003: Dinamo-Polyot Bishkek

== Achievements ==
- Kyrgyzstan League
  - Winners (3): 1997, 1998, 1999
- Kyrgyzstan Cup
  - Runners-up (1): 1995

== See also ==
- Dinamo-Manas-SKIF Bishkek
