= Kyrgyzstan Cup =

Kyrgyzstan Cup Кыргызстан Кубогу
- Founded: 1992; 34 years ago
- Country: Kyrgyzstan
- Confederation: AFC (Asia)
- Number of clubs: 36
- Domestic cup: Kyrgyzstan Super Cup
- League cup: AFC Challenge League
- Current champions: FC Neftchi Kochkor-Ata (3 titles) (2026)
- Most championships: Dordoi Bishkek (11 titles)
- Broadcaster: Kyrgyz Sport TV
- Current: 2026

The Kyrgyzs Republic Cup (Kyrgyz: Кыргызстан Кубогу, Kyrgyz Respublikasynyn Kubogu) is Kyrgyzstan's premier knockout tournament in men's football.

== Previous winners ==
Previous winners of the cup are:

=== Soviet time ===
- 1939 Dinamo Frunze
- 1940 Spartak Frunze
- 1941-44 not played
- 1945 Dinamo Frunze
- 1946 Burevestnik Frunze
- 1947 Burevestnik Frunze
- 1948 Burevestnik Frunze
- 1949 Burevestnik Frunze
- 1950 Burevestnik Frunze
- 1951 Dinamo Frunze
- 1952 Dinamo Frunze
- 1953 Frunze City Team
- 1954 Kalininskoye Town Team
- 1955 Spartak Frunze
- 1956 Torpedo Frunze
- 1957 Kalininskoye Town Team
- 1958 Kalininskoye Town Team
- 1959 Torpedo Frunze
- 1960 Kalininskoye Town Team
- 1961 Alga Kalininskoye
- 1962 Alga Kalininskoye
- 1963 Alga Kalininskoye
- 1964 Elektrik Frunze
- 1965 Selmashevets Frunze
- 1966 Selmashevets Frunze
- 1967 Instrumentalshchik Frunze
- 1968 Selmashevets Frunze
- 1969 Selmashevets Frunze
- 1970 Selmashevets Frunze
- 1971 Instrumentalshchik Frunze
- 1972 Khimik Kara-Balta
- 1973 Selmashevets Frunze
- 1974 Instrumentalshchik Frunze
- 1975 Selmashevets Frunze
- 1976 Tekstilshchik Frunze
- 1977 Selmashevets Frunze
- 1978 Instrumentalshchik Frunze
- 1979 Instrumentalshchik Frunze
- 1980 Motor Frunze
- 1981 Instrumentalshchik Frunze
- 1982-83 not played
- 1984 Selmashevets Frunze
- 1985 Selmashevets Frunze
- 1986 Elektrik Frunze
- 1987 Elektrik Frunze
- 1988 Instrumentalshchik Frunze
- 1989 Selmashevets Frunze
- 1990 Selmashevets Frunze
- 1991 Selmashevets Frunze

=== Since independence ===
Winners since 1992 are:

Year	Winner	Result	Runners-up
1992	Alga Bishkek	2–1	Alay Osh
1993	Alga-RIIF Bishkek	4–0	Alga Bishkek
1994	Ak-Maral Tokmak	2–1 (a.e.t.)	Alay Osh
1995	Semetey Kyzyl-Kiya	2–0	Dinamo Bishkek
1996	AiK Bishkek	2–0	Metallurg Kadamjay
1997	Alga-PVO Bishkek	1–0	Dinamo-Alay Osh
1998	SKA-PVO Bishkek	3–0	Dinamo-Alay Osh
1999	SKA-PVO Bishkek	3–0	Semetey Kyzyl-Kiya
2000	SKA-PVO Bishkek	2–0	Dinamo-Alay Osh
2001	SKA-PVO Bishkek	1–0	Zhashtyk Ak Altyn Kara-Suu
2002	SKA-PVO Bishkek	1–0	Zhashtyk Ak Altyn Kara-Suu
2003	SKA-PVO Bishkek	1–0	Zhashtyk Ak Altyn Kara-Suu
2004	Dordoi-Dynamo Naryn	1–0	Zhashtyk Ak Altyn Kara-Suu
2005	Dordoi-Dynamo Naryn	1–0	Zhashtyk Ak Altyn Kara-Suu
2006	Dordoi-Dynamo Naryn	4–0	Zhashtyk Ak Altyn Kara-Suu
2007	Abdysh-Ata Kant	2–1	Lokomotiv Jalalabad
2008	Dordoi-Dynamo Naryn	2–2 (a.e.t.) (4–3 pen)	Zhashtyk Ak Altyn Kara-Suu
2009	Abdysh-Ata Kant	2–0	Alay Osh
2010	Dordoi-Dynamo Naryn	3–0	FC Neftchi Kochkor-Ata
2011	Abdysh-Ata Kant	1–0	FC Neftchi Kochkor-Ata
2012	Dordoi Bishkek	6–1	Alga Bishkek
2013	Alay Osh	1–1 (a.e.t.) (4–2 pen)	Dordoi Bishkek
2014	Dordoi Bishkek	2–1	Abdysh-Ata Kant
2015	Abdysh-Ata Kant	4–2	Nashe Pivo
2016	Dordoi Bishkek	1–0	Alay Osh
2017	Dordoi Bishkek	0–0 a.e.t. (4–3 pen)	Alay Osh
2018	Dordoi Bishkek	3–2	Alay Osh
2019	Neftchi Kochkor-Ata	1–0	Dordoi Bishkek
2020	Alay Osh	1–0	Abdysh-Ata Kant
2021	Neftchi Kochkor-Ata	0–0 (a.e.t.) (4–3 pen)	Alga Bishkek
2022	Abdysh-Ata Kant	1–0	Neftchi Kochkor-Ata
2023	Muras United	2–1	Abdysh-Ata Kant
2024	Muras United	3–2 (a.e.t.)	Abdysh-Ata Kant
2025	Dordoi Bishkek	2–1 (a.e.t.)	Muras United
2026	Neftchi Kochkor-Ata	2–1	Muras United

== Titles by club ==
Club	Won	Runner-up	Years won	Years runner-up
Dordoi Bishkek (includes Dordoi-Dynamo Naryn)	11	2	2004, 2005, 2006, 2008, 2010, 2012, 2014, 2016, 2017, 2018, 2025	2013, 2019
Alga Bishkek (includes Alga-RIIF Bishkek, Alga-PVO Bishkek and SKA-PVO Bishkek)	9	3	1992, 1993, 1997, 1998, 1999, 2000, 2001, 2002, 2003	1993, 2012, 2021
Abdysh-Ata Kant	5	4	2007, 2009, 2011, 2015, 2022	2014, 2020, 2023, 2024
Alay Osh (includes Dinamo-Alay Osh)	2	9	2013, 2020	1992, 1994, 1997, 1998, 2000, 2009, 2016, 2017, 2018
FC Neftchi Kochkor-Ata	3	3	2019, 2021, 2026	2010, 2011, 2022
Muras United	2	2	2023, 2024	2025, 2026
Semetey Kyzyl-Kiya	1	1	1995	1999
AiK Bishkek	1		1996	
Ak-Maral Tokmak	1		1994	
Zhashtyk Ak Altyn Kara-Suu		7		2001, 2002, 2003, 2004, 2005, 2006, 2008
Dinamo Bishkek		1		1995
Lokomotiv Jalalabad		1		2007
Metallurg Kadamjay		1		1996
Nashe Pivo		1		2015
