= Kyrgyzstan Women's League =

- Founded: 2005; 21 years ago
- Country: Kyrgyzstan
- Confederation: AFC
- Level on pyramid: 1
- International cup: AFC Women's Champions League
- Current champions: Ilbirs Bishkek (2025)
- Website: FFKR
- Current: 2026

Kyrgyzstan Women's League is the top division of women's football in Kyrgyzstan. The league is organized by the Football Federation of Kyrgyz Republic and was established in 2005. Before 1991, some Kyrgyz women's clubs had competed in the Soviet Union women's league system, but after the collapse of the Soviet Union, most teams simply dissolved.

As of late 2009, only 6 senior women's football teams existed in Kyrgyzstan, meaning there is no second level league.

== Champions ==
The champions so far are:

- 2005: El'dorado Altyn-Olko (Bishkek)
- 2006: El'dorado Altyn-Olko (Bishkek)
- 2007: SDYUSHORSI (Bishkek)
- 2008: SDYUSHORSI
- 2009: SDYUSHORSI
- 2010: SDYUSHORSI
- 2011: SDYUSHORSI
- 2012: Abdysh-Ata (Kant)
- 2013: Abdysh-Ata
- 2014: FC RSDYUSHOR (Bishkek)
- 2015: RSDYUSHOR (Karakol)
- 2016: FC RSDYUSHOR (Bishkek
- 2017: FC RSDYUSHOR (Bishkek)
- 2018: CHO SDYUSHOR (Kant)
- 2019: DYUSH (Bishkek)
- 2020: Not played
- 2021: SDYUSHOR Sl Alge
- 2022: SDYUSHOR Sl Alge
- 2023: SDYUSHOR Sl Alge
- 2024: SDYUSHOR Sl Alge
- 2025: Ilbirs Bishkek

== Top goalscorers ==
Season	Player	Team	Goals
2010	(Kyrgyzstan) Alina Litvinenko	Azalea	30
2014	(Kyrgyzstan) Aidana Otorbaeva	Abdysh-Ata	4
2018	(Kyrgyzstan) Ayjan Boronbekova	SDYUSHOR	24
2021	(Kyrgyzstan) Batma Kokonbaeva	Yunost	47
2022	(Kyrgyzstan) Medina Rishekova	Issyk-Kul	53
2023	(Kyrgyzstan) Makhabat Dayirbekova	Yunost	35

Most goals in a season

- 53
  - (Kyrgyzstan) Medina Rishekova (2022)
