= 2010 Kyrgyzstan Women's League =

Following is a list of results of the 2010 Kyrgyzstan League Women season. Kyrgyzstan League Women is top division of the women's football in Kyrgyzstan. The league is organized by the Football Federation of Kyrgyz Republic and was established in 2005.

Pos	Team	Pts
1	SDYUSHORSI Azalea Bishkek	32
2	Adbish-Ata Kant	28
3	Adbish-Ata-2 Karakol	25
4	Zhyluuluk Jalal-Abad	16
5	Yuzhanka Osh	11
6	Khimik Chuy Province	7
