= Yevgeny Yuryev =

Soviet and Russian military officer (1951–2020)

- Native name: Евгений Леонидович Юрьев
- Born: 28 March 1951; Novorossiysk, Russian SFSR, Soviet Union
- Died: 25 April 2020 (aged 69)
- Allegiance: Soviet Union; Russia
- Branch: Air Defence Forces
- Service years: 1968–2006
- Rank: Lieutenant general
- Commands: 5th Air and Air Defence Forces Army
- Awards: Order "For Merit to the Fatherland", Fourth Class; Order "For Service to the Homeland in the Armed Forces of the USSR", Third Class; Order of Holy Prince Daniel of Moscow, Third Class; Order of Saint Righteous Grand Duke Dmitry Donskoy, Third Class; Order of Saint Seraphim of Sarov, Third Class

Yevgeny Leonidovich Yuryev (Russian: Евгений Леонидович Юрьев; 28 March 1951 – 25 April 2020) was a Russian officer in the Soviet and Russian Air Defence Forces. Over his military career Yuryev served in various positions, commanding brigades, divisions, corps, and finally the 5th Air and Air Defence Forces Army, before retiring in 2006 with the rank of lieutenant general.

Born in Novorossiysk in 1951, Yuryev embarked on a career in the Soviet Armed Forces in 1968, attending the Engels Anti-Aircraft Missile School, and on graduation, was assigned to the Siberian Military District for service with an anti-aircraft missile division. He rose through the ranks and posts over the following years, and after studies at the Military Command Academy of Air Defence, had staff and command positions across the Soviet Union, in the Odessa, Leningrad, Transcaucasian and North Caucasus Military Districts, as well as abroad in Leipzig as part of the Group of Soviet Forces in Germany. Following the dissolution of the Soviet Union in 1991, Yuryev continued to serve in the military, and graduated from the Military Academy of the General Staff of the Armed Forces of Russia in 1994. Service as a division commander in the Far Eastern Military District followed, and in 2001 he became commander of the 5th Air and Air Defence Forces Army. Yuryev served as the Army's commander until retiring in 2006 with the rank of lieutenant general.

In retirement Yuryev worked for the automobile manufacturer AvtoVAZ, and was also president of the "M. T. Kalashnikov Military-Sport Union". He had a career in local politics, sitting as a deputy in the Samara Provincial Duma as a representative of United Russia. Over his career Yuryev had received several government awards, and those of the Russian Orthodox Church.

== Military career ==
Yuryev was born on 28 March 1951 in the city of Novorossiysk, Krasnodar Krai, then part of the Russian SFSR, in the Soviet Union. His father Leonid Yevgenievich Yuryev, born in 1914, was a soldier, while his mother, Anna Stepanovna Yuryeva, born in 1918, was a medical worker. Both are buried in the village of Khryashchevka, Stavropolsky District, Samara Oblast.

He studied at the Engels Anti-Aircraft Missile School as a cadet from 1968, graduating in 1972. He was then appointed head of intelligence of an anti-aircraft missile division in the Siberian Military District, serving as such until 1974. He was then appointed senior engineer of a mobile radar complex in the Siberian Military District, holding the position until 1977, when he became head of a regimental command post and deputy chief of staff, still within the Siberian Military District. In 1979 he enrolled in the Military Command Academy of Air Defence, graduating in 1982.

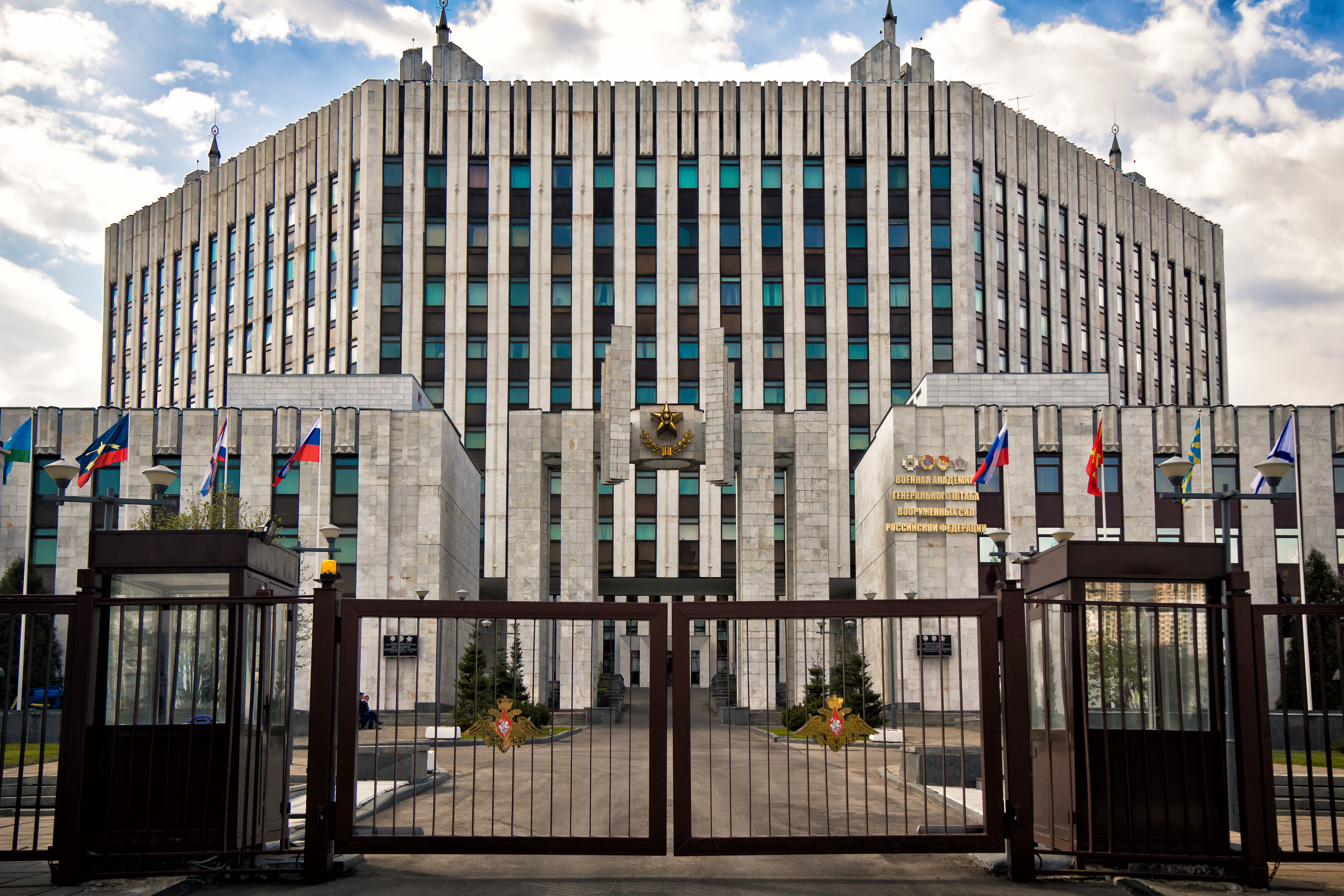
The building of the Military Academy of the General Staff of the Armed Forces of Russia. Yuryev studied at the academy between 1992 and 1994, prior to being appointed to senior staff posts.

After completing his studies at the Academy, Yuryev was appointed the commander of an anti-aircraft missile division in the Odessa Military District, before, in 1984, becoming chief of staff and deputy commander of an anti-aircraft missile brigade stationed in Leipzig, as part of the Group of Soviet Forces in Germany. This posting lasted until 1985, when he became commander of the brigade, before returning to the Soviet Union in 1988 to take up the post of chief of staff and deputy commander of an air defence division in Leningrad Military District. From 1989 to 1991 Yuryev was chief of staff and deputy commander of the air defence division in the Transcaucasian Military District, and then from 1991 to 1992 he was deputy commander of the air defence corps in the North Caucasus Military District. In 1992 Yuryev enrolled in the Military Academy of the General Staff of the Armed Forces of Russia, specialising in the study of command and staff-level operational and strategic issues. He graduated in 1994 and became a division commander in the Far Eastern Military District. From 1997 until 2001 he served as commander of the Separate Air Defence Corps, part of the Air Defence Forces, based in Yekaterinburg.

In 2001 he became commander of the 5th Air and Air Defence Forces Army. During his time in command the 5th Army's area of responsibility included twenty-two subjects of the Russian Federation: five republics, four autonomous okrugs, and thirteen oblasts. During time in command the Kant air base in Kyrgyzstan was established as an overseas base of the 5th Army, as part of the aviation component of the Collective Security Treaty Organization. The 5th Air and Air Defence Forces Army also had responsibility for the launch and recovery of crewed and uncrewed space objects, with Yuryev and his personnel achieving good results in this work. Between 2003 and 2005 the 5th Air and Air Defence Forces Army was recognized as the best in Russia's Air Forces for combat readiness, combat training, the state of military discipline and the rule of law. For this the Army and its personnel received the thanks of the President of Russia. Yuryev served as the Army's commander until retiring in April 2006 with the rank of lieutenant general.

== Retirement and political career ==
Following his retirement, Yuryev was hired in June 2006 by the automobile manufacturer AvtoVAZ to be its Deputy General Director for Social and Economic Development and Cooperation with Government Agencies. From 2007 he was employed as AvtoVAZ's executive director for interaction with government bodies. In retirement he was also president of the "M. T. Kalashnikov Military-Sport Union".

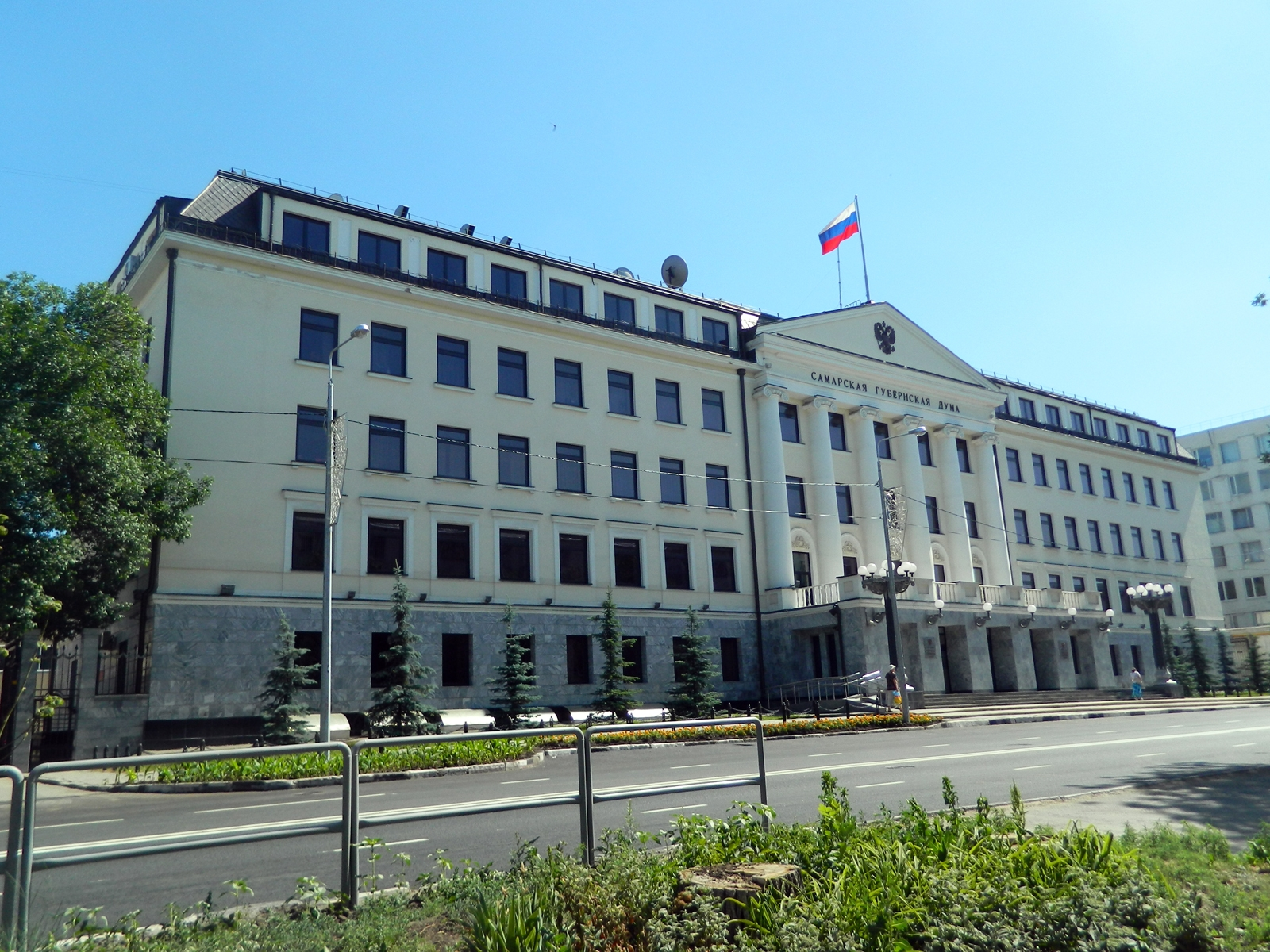
The Samara Provincial Duma. Yuryev was a deputy, and deputy chairman in the duma's IV convocation.

Yuryev embarked on a career in local politics, winning a seat in the Samara Provincial Duma's IV convocation on 11 March 2007, as a representative of United Russia. He sat as Deputy Chairman of the Samara Provincial Duma. On 30 January 2012 Yuryev announced that he was leaving United Russia to "get out of the backstage struggle." He registered as an independent candidate in that year's mayoral elections for the city of Tolyatti, winning 3.96 percent of the vote.

Over his career Yuryev had received the government awards of the Order "For Service to the Homeland in the Armed Forces of the USSR" Third Class in 1987, and the Order "For Merit to the Fatherland" Fourth Class in 2001. He had also received the several orders of the Russian Orthodox Church; the Order of Holy Prince Daniel of Moscow Third Class, the Order of Saint Righteous Grand Duke Dmitry Donskoy Third Class and the Order of Saint Seraphim of Sarov Third Class. He also had over thirty medals. On 28 April 2009 the Samara Provincial Duma awarded him an honorary badge "For merits in lawmaking."

== Death ==
Yuryev died on 25 April 2020 at the age of 69. His funeral and burial took place on 27 April at the Church of Saint George the Victorious in the village of Khryashchevka. He was married, with a daughter and a granddaughter.
