= 2011 Kyrgyzstan Women's League =

The 2011 season of the Kyrgyz Women's League started on 1 May 2011 in Kant. The championship will be held as a triple round-robin tournament. Each round stretches only over five days, where teams play against each other, one match at a day in a single city. So the season will commence after the third matchweek.

The second matchweek was held from 21 to 25 August 2011 in Talas. The third matchday was held in October in Bishkek.

Sdyushorsi from Bishkek won the championship due to a better goal difference over Adbish-Ata from Kant.

== Final league standings ==
Locations of teams in the 2011 Kyrgyz Women's League

Pos	Team	Pld	W	D	L	GF	GA	GD	Pts
1	Sdyushorsi, Bishkek (C)	15	13	1	1	94	4	+90	40
2	Adbish-Ata, Kant	15	13	1	1	94	8	+86	40
3	Yuzhanka, Osh	15	9	0	6	25	28	−3	27
4	Zhyluuluk, Jalal-Abad	15	5	1	9	27	54	−27	16
5	Sbornaya , Talas	15	2	1	12	7	54	−47	7
6	Khimik, Chuy Province	15	1	0	14	4	102	−98	3

(C) Champions

Round 1 in upper half Round 2 in bottom half	SDY	ADB	YUZ	ZHY	SBO	KHI
Sdyushorsi, Bishkek		6–0	3–0	11–0	3–0	11–0
Adbish-Ata, Kant	2–1		2–1	9–0	7–0	13–0
Yuzhanka, Osh	0–2	0–6		1–0	3–0	3–1
Zhyluuluk, Jalal-Abad	1–5	0–4	0–3		3–1	8–0
Sbornaya, Talas	0–9	0–11	0–1	2–2		2–0
Khimik, Chuy Province	0–11	0–11	0–3	0–3	0–2	

Source: Result grid after Matchweek 1: and Matchweek 2

Round 3 results	SDY	ADB	YUZ	ZHY	SBO	KHI
Sdyushorsi, Bishkek		0–0	5–0	12–1	3–0 (Note: Sbornaya from Talas was absent from the matchweek, resulting in awarded 0–3 losses.)	12–0
Adbish-Ata, Kant	–		7–0	6–0	3–0	11–0
Yuzhanka, Osh	–	–		2–1	3–0	6–0
Zhyluuluk, Jalal-Abad	–	–	–		3–0	6–0
Sbornaya, Talas	–	–	–	–		0–3
Khimik, Chuy Province	–	–	–	–	–	

Source: Results of the third match week.
Notes:

The league's top scorer award was given to Ramin Choi with 21 goals for Sdyushorsi (Bishkek).
