= 2006 Kyrgyzstan Women's League =

The 2006 Kyrgyzstan Women's League was the second season of the Kyrgyzstan Women's League, the top division of Women's football in Kyrgyzstan. El Dorado Altyn-Olko Bishkek was the champion.

== League standings ==
Pos	Team	Pld	W	D	L	GF	GA	GD	Pts
1	El Dorado Altyn-Olko Bishkek	5	5	0	0	23	2	+21	15
2	Azaliya Birinchi Bishkek	5	4	0	1	20	4	+16	12
3	Zhyldyz Karakol	5	3	0	2	13	11	+2	9
4	Sholokov Sokuluk	5	2	0	3	9	12	−3	6
5	Abdyzh-Ata Kant	5	1	0	4	6	22	−16	3
6	Molodezhnaya Sbornaya KR	5	0	0	5	4	24	−20	0

Source: rsssf.com
