= 5th Air and Air Defence Forces Army =

5th Army of Air Forces and Air Defence
- Active: 2001–2009
- Country: Russia
- Branch: Russian Air Force
- Size: 2000s: ~ 3-5 air regiments
- Garrison/HQ: Yekaterinburg

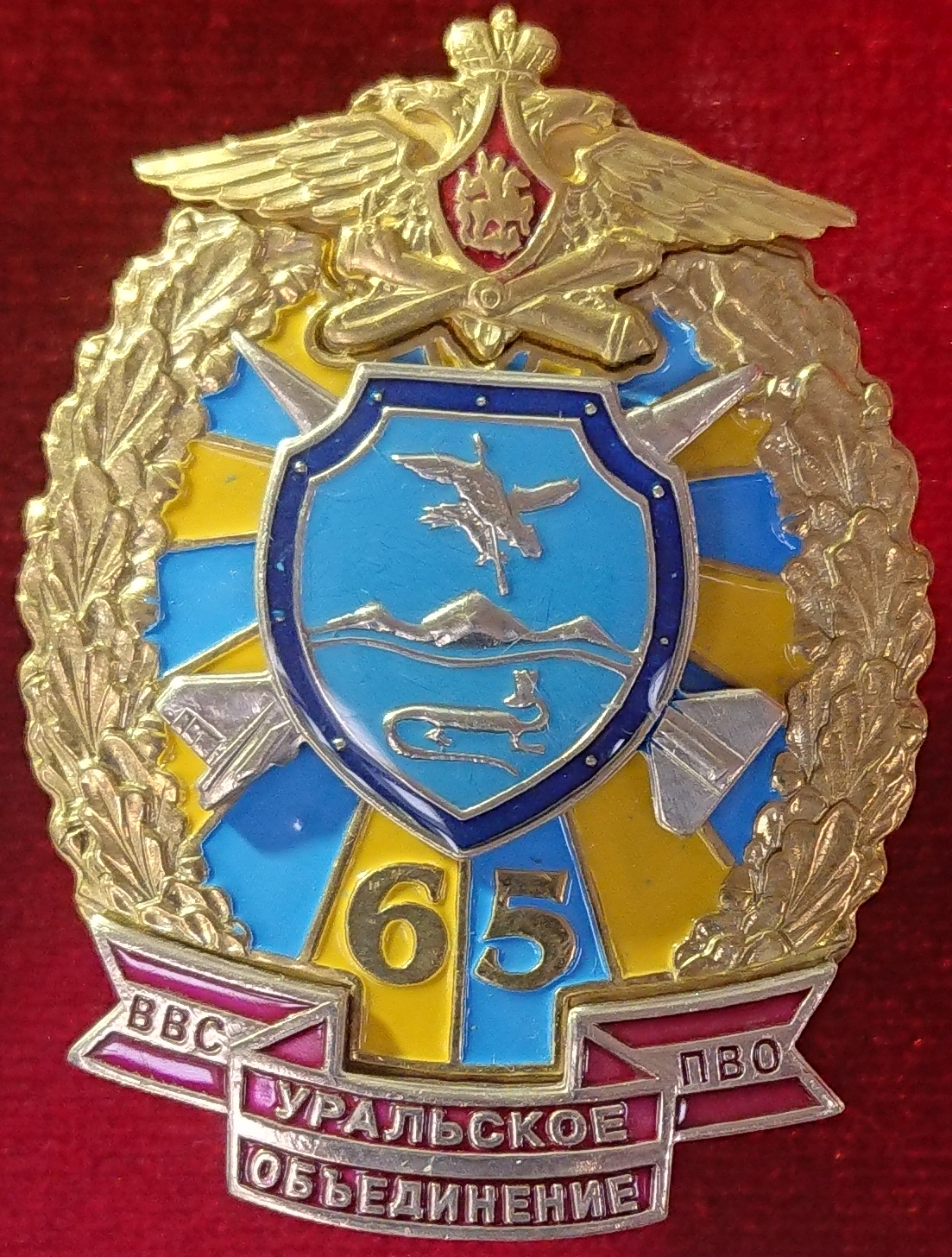
A medal for 60 years of service in the army at the UNMC Military Equipment Museum

The 5th Army of VVS and PVO (5-я Краснознамённая армия военно-воздушных сил и противовоздушной обороны) was the Russian Air Force's smallest Air Army, with the headquarters located in Yekaterinburg. Its zone of responsibility was the Volga-Ural Military District, on the border between Europe and Asia.

The army shared its numerical numbering, but little history/lineage, with the Soviet Air Forces' 5th Air Army of the Second World War.

== History ==
After the fall of the Soviet Union, the 4th Independent Air Defence Army of the former Soviet Air Defence Forces remained operating with its headquarters at Yekaterinburg. Either on 10 June 1994 or in December 1994 the army became the 5th Independent Air Defence Corps. On 1 May 1998 this brought in air forces formations (as listed at and ) and became the 5th Independent Corps of VVS and PVO. On 1 January 2001 (Holm, date of the directive?) or 1 June 2001 (Ivlev, note 1) the formation became the 5th Army of the VVS and PVO.

Until October 2003 and the creation of the Russian airbase at Kant, Kyrgyzstan in Kyrgyzstan where a small number of Sukhoi Su-25 attack aircraft were located, the Air Army had no combat aircraft. It had only three regiments of surface-to-air missiles (Yekaterinburg, Samara and Engels), but also included two helicopter regiments and some other auxiliary units (seemingly the Balashov Higher Military Aviation School of Pilots (Saratov Oblast); the Orenburg Higher Military Aviation School of Pilots (Orenburg Oblast); the Syzran Highest Military Aviation School of Pilots (Kuybyshev Oblast); the Saratov Higher Military Aviation School of Pilots (Saratov Oblast); the Ufa Higher Military Aviation School of Pilots (Bashkirskaya ASSR); and the Chelyabinsk Higher Military Aviation School of Navigators.

The 764th Fighter Aviation Regiment, operating MiG-31 aircraft, which was stationed at Bolshoye Savino Airport 16 km southwest of Perm, within the 5th Air Army's zone, was subordinated directly to the Air Forces HQ in Moscow. In addition to the Kant airbase established in 2003, possibly another air base in Dushanbe, Tajikistan, was subordinate to the 5th A VVS i PVO. From July 2007 to its disbandment, the commander of the 5th Army was Lieutenant General Mikhail Kucheryavy.

In 2007, 12 Mi-24 and 12 Mi-8s of the Army took part in the joint Sino-Russian exercise Peace Mission 2007.

On 7 May 2009 the Army was disbanded and its units incorporated within the new 2nd Air and Air Defence Forces Command and the 4th Air and Air Defence Forces Command, along with the 4th Air and Air Defence Forces Army.

=== Commanders ===
- General-Lieutenant Nikolay Petrovich Timofeev, 1990 - 1995
- General-Lieutenant Nikolay Ivanovich Makarchuk, 1995 - 1997
- General-Lieutenant Evgeniy Leonidovich Yurev, 1997 - 6.07
- General-Lieutenant Mikhail Kucheryavy, June 2007 - 2009

=== 2007 Russian Structure ===
- Headquarters, 5th Air Army - Yekaterinburg
  - 30th Aviation Base - HQ at Koltsovo near Yekaterinburg - An-26 (former 142nd Independent Composite Air Squadron);
  - 303rd Independent Helicopter Squadron (Hisor, Tajikistan)
  - 320th Independent Transport Squadron of Search & Rescue Service - HQ at Uprun (Troitsk), near Chelyabinsk - Mi-8;
  - 999th Air Base - HQ at Kant, Kyrgyzstan - L-39, Mi-8, Su-25;
- 76th Air Defence Division (Samara)
  - 511th Guards Anti-Aircraft Rocket Regiment (Engels, Saratov Oblast)
  - 185th Anti-Aircraft Rocket Regiment (former 57th SAM Brigade) (Beryozovsky/Берёзовский, Sverdlovsk Oblast)
  - 568th(?) Anti-Aircraft Rocket Regiment (Samara) - in December 1993 renamed from 134th Red Banner Anti-Aircraft Rocket Brigade
  - One radiotechnical brigade, one radiotechnical regiment (radar)
- Army Aviation component
    - 793rd Independent Helicopter Regiment - HQ at Kinel'-Cherkasy - Mi-8, Mi-26;
    - 237th Independent Helicopter Squadron - HQ at Bobrovka - Mi-8, Mi-24;
