= Kant (air base) =

Russian air base located in Kyrgyzstan

Kant
- Kant, Chüy Region in Kyrgyzstan
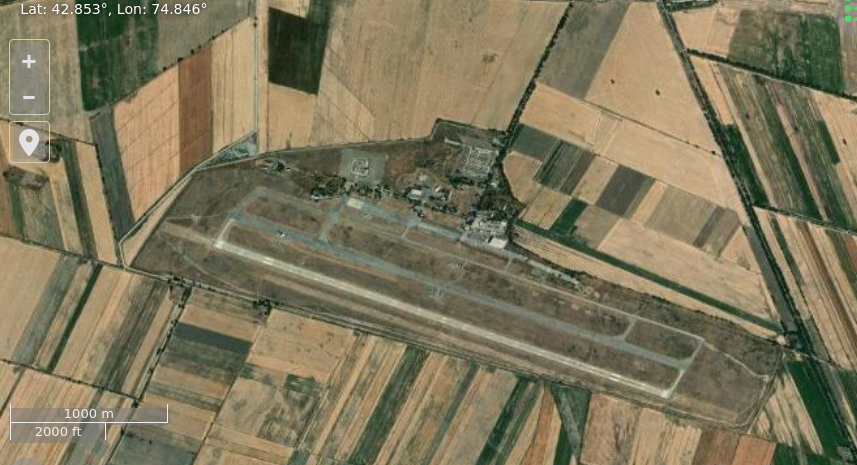
- Satellite imagery of Kant air base

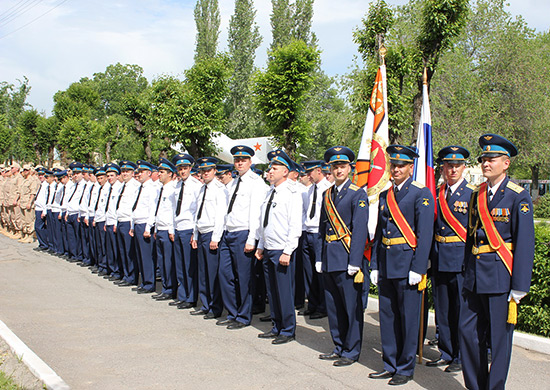

Site information
- Type: Air Base
- Owner: Armed Forces of the Kyrgyz Republic
- Operator: Russian Aerospace Forces

Location
- Shown within Kyrgyzstan Kant (Asia)
- Coordinates: 42°51′11″N 74°50′47″E

Site history
- Built: 1941
- In use: 1941-1992; 2003-present

Airfield information
- Identifiers: ICAO: UAFW
- Elevation: 777 metres (2,549 ft) AMSL
Runways
Direction	Length and surface
11/29	2,700 metres (8,858 ft) Concrete

Kant Air Base (Russian: Авиабаза Кант Aviabaza Kant) (ICAO: UAFW) is a military air base in Ysyk-Ata District of Chüy Region in Kyrgyzstan. It is located just south of Kant, around 20 km east of Bishkek and is home to the Russian Aerospace Forces' 999th Air Base.

== History ==
The history of the airfield in Kant goes back to 1941, when the Odessa Military Aviation School of Pilots was evacuated to Kyrgyzstan. The School had been formed by an order of the People's Commissar of Defence of the USSR dated February 23, 1941. After Operation Barbarossa, the German invasion of the Soviet Union beginning on June 22, 1941, the school stopped training sessions, and its cadets began to perform combat missions on I-15 aircraft to cover Odessa from air strikes by the Nazi German Luftwaffe. In July 1941, the aviation school moved to Stalingrad, and then to the suburbs of the city Frunze, where military pilots were trained for the front. During the war years, 1507 pilots were trained at the aviation school, 7 of which were awarded the title Hero of the Soviet Union.

Subsequently, in 1947, the school in Kyrgyzstan was renamed the Frunze Military Aviation School for Pilots of the USSR Air Force. A training aviation regiment was formed in 1951 or 1952.

From 1956, the school also trained foreign pilots. Among its graduates were Egyptian former president Hosni Mubarak and the late Syrian president Hafez al-Assad, as well as India's Air Chief Marshal Dilbagh Singh, and South Yemen Brigadier Pilot Shakib Khobani.

In 1959, the regiment was transferred to the renamed 5th Central Course for Preparation and Improvement of Aviation Personnel.

In 1992, following the dissolution of the Soviet Union, control of the air base was transferred to Kyrgyzstan.

== Present-day Russian base ==
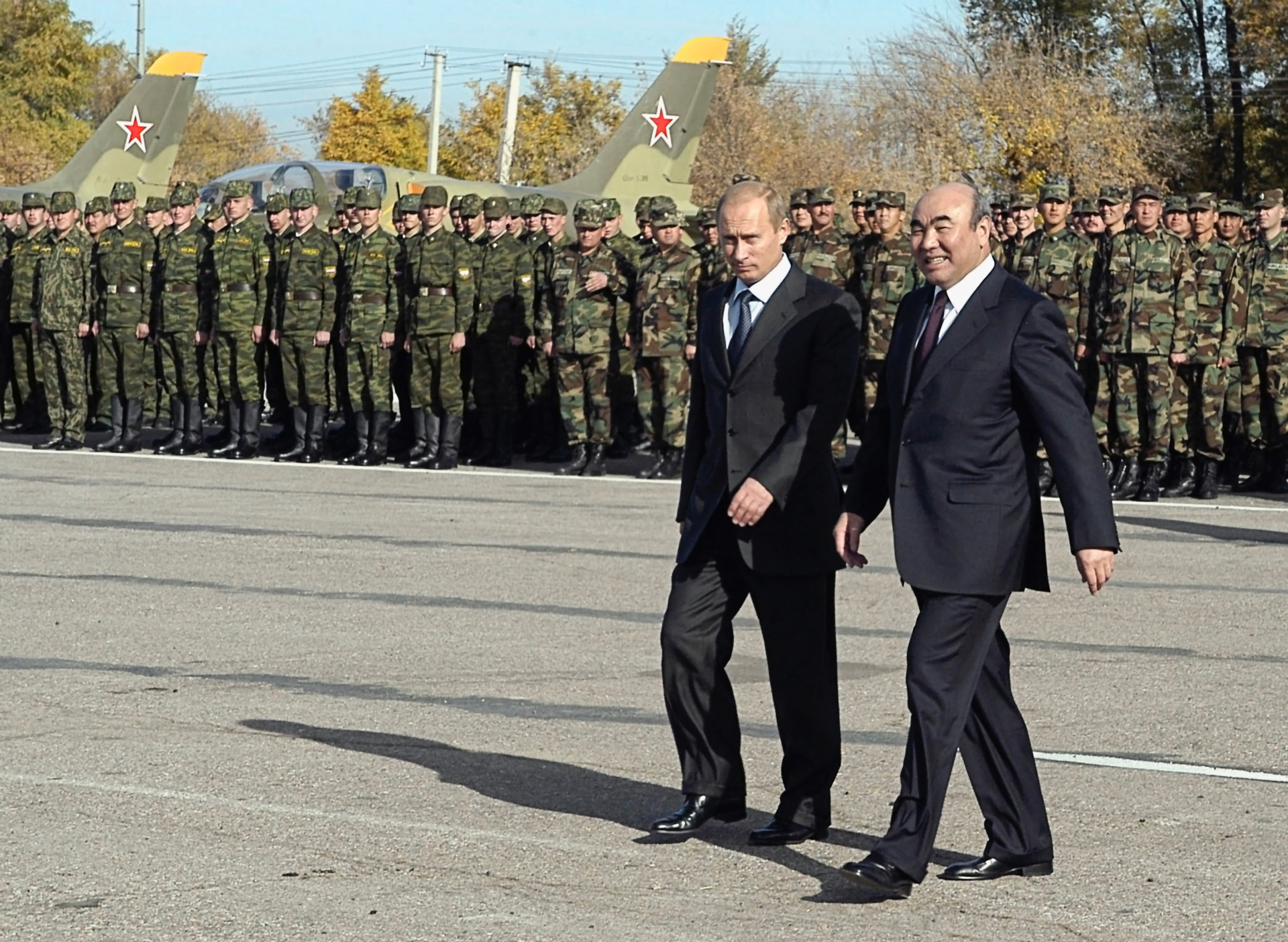
Russian president Vladimir Putin and former president Askar Akayev at Kant Air Base

In accordance with a bilateral agreement between Russia and Kyrgyzstan signed on 22 September 2003, the air base hosts Russian Aerospace Forces units. The official opening took place on 23 October 2003, making the facility the first new air base Russia opened abroad since 1991. The unit stationed there has been described as Russian Aerospace Forces' 5th Air and Air Defence Forces Army's 999th Air Base.

In December 2012, Kyrgyzstan agreed to lease the base to Russia for fifteen years (with an option for an automatic extension for an additional five years) after the Russian government agreed to reduce Kyrgyz debt by $500 million.

As of February 2023, the Russian forces at the airbase is equipped with Su-25SM ground-support aircraft, Mi-8MTV5-1 helicopters, Orlan-10 UAVs, as well as a unit of the military police and military traffic police.

== See also ==
- List of military airbases in Russia
