= Kant, Kyrgyzstan =

Kant Кант
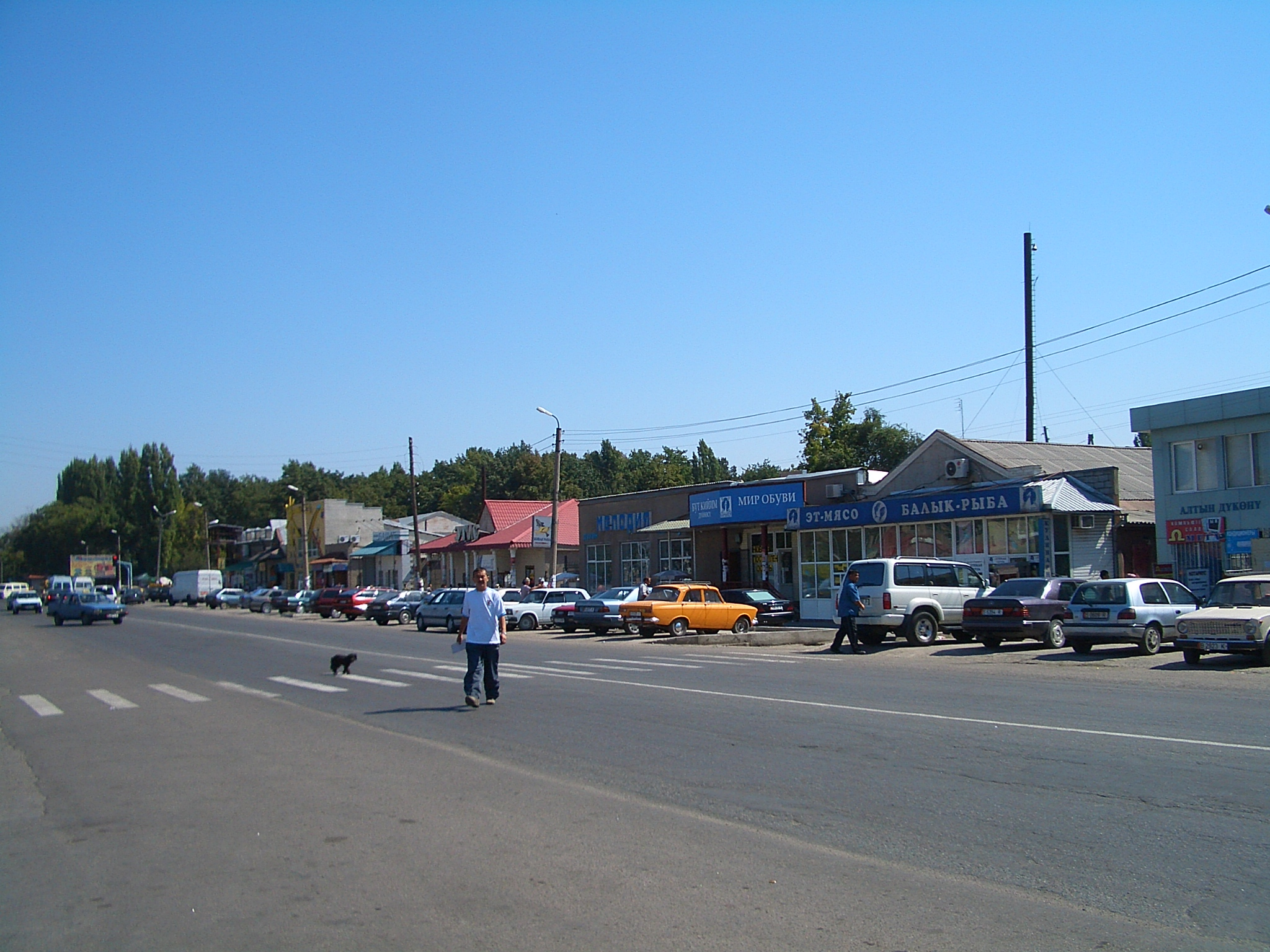
- The main street of Kant

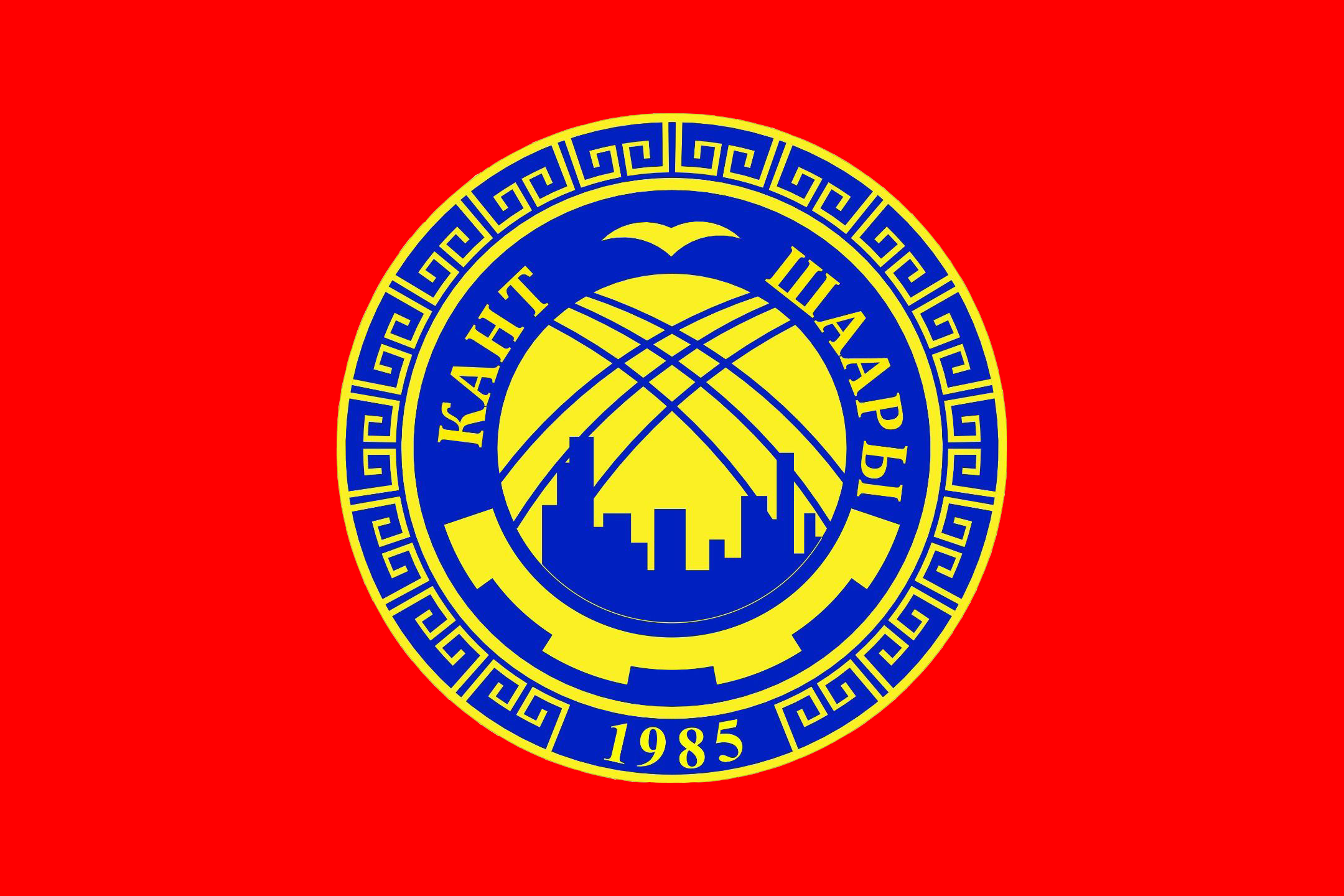
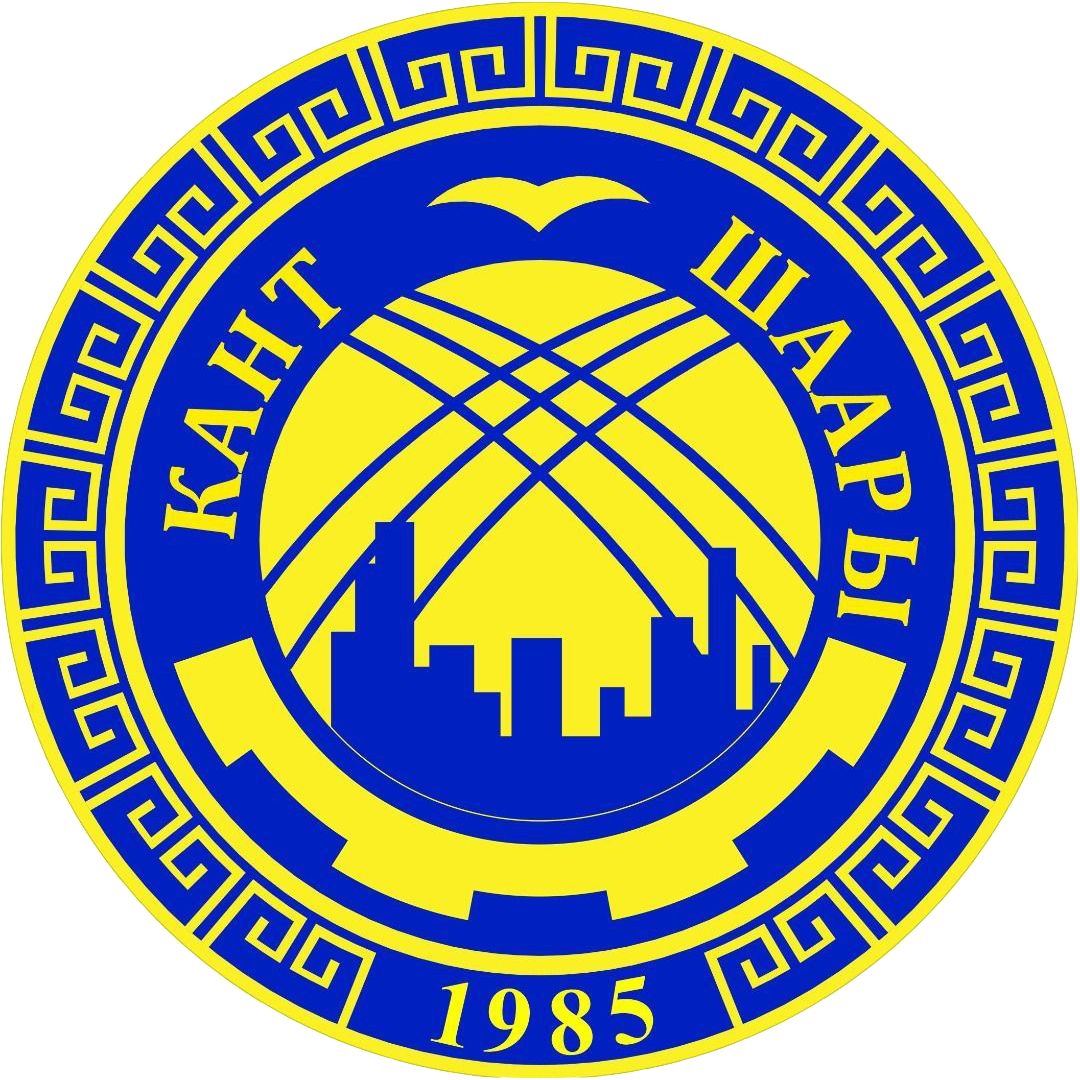
- Flag Coat of arms

- Location in Kyrgyzstan
- Coordinates: 42°53′N 74°51′E
- Country: Kyrgyzstan
- Region: Chüy
- District: Ysyk-Ata
- Established: 1928
- Elevation: 743 m (2,437 ft)

Population (2021)
  - Total: 22,617
- Time zone: UTC+6

Kant (Kyrgyz: Кант) is a town in the Chüy Valley of northern Kyrgyzstan, some 20 kilometres (12 mi) east of Bishkek. It is the administrative center of the Ysyk-Ata District (formerly Kant District). Its population was 22,617 in 2021. Kant was established in 1928.

The Kyrgyz word for sugar is "kant", and the city received its name when a sugar plant was built there in the 1930s (it is an often repeated myth that the town was named after the German philosopher Immanuel Kant).

Kant is an industrial and service center. Among notable local enterprises is the Abdysh Ata Brewery, whose products are well known throughout Kyrgyzstan.

It is also known for its famous medical institute by the name of Asian Medical Institute (AsMI).

During the Soviet era, Kant and its surrounding area were home to many ethnic Germans who had been forcibly relocated to Central Asia in 1941 from the Volga region when the Volga German Autonomous Soviet Socialist Republic was abolished. Most left for Germany during the 1990s and after the demise of the Soviet Union when the factories where they had worked shut down. Several other nearby settlements, such as Luxemburg and Bergtal, still carry their German names, but retain only very small remnants of their Volga German and Russian Mennonite founders.

== Demographics ==
Historical populations of Kant
Year	Pop.	±% p.a.
1970	19,210	—
1979	21,062	+1.03%
1989	24,014	+1.32%
1999	22,075	−0.84%
2009	21,589	−0.22%
2021	22,617	+0.39%
Note: resident population; Sources:

== Geography ==
=== Climate ===
Kant has humid continental climate (Köppen climate classification: Dsa).

Climate data for Kant
Month	Jan	Feb	Mar	Apr	May	Jun	Jul	Aug	Sep	Oct	Nov	Dec	Year
Mean daily maximum °C (°F)	1.4 (34.5)	2.6 (36.7)	9.2 (48.6)	17.9 (64.2)	23.0 (73.4)	27.9 (82.2)	31.0 (87.8)	29.9 (85.8)	24.7 (76.5)	17.0 (62.6)	8.6 (47.5)	3.4 (38.1)	16.4 (61.5)
Daily mean °C (°F)	−4.2 (24.4)	−2.9 (26.8)	3.9 (39.0)	11.8 (53.2)	16.7 (62.1)	21.1 (70.0)	23.9 (75.0)	22.5 (72.5)	17.4 (63.3)	10.6 (51.1)	3.2 (37.8)	−1.8 (28.8)	10.2 (50.3)
Mean daily minimum °C (°F)	−9.8 (14.4)	−8.4 (16.9)	−1.4 (29.5)	5.7 (42.3)	10.5 (50.9)	14.4 (57.9)	16.8 (62.2)	15.2 (59.4)	10.2 (50.4)	4.2 (39.6)	−2.2 (28.0)	−6.9 (19.6)	4.0 (39.3)
Average precipitation mm (inches)	25 (1.0)	29 (1.1)	48 (1.9)	73 (2.9)	65 (2.6)	35 (1.4)	16 (0.6)	11 (0.4)	16 (0.6)	40 (1.6)	39 (1.5)	27 (1.1)	424 (16.7)
Source: Climate-Data.org

== Air base ==
The Kant Air Base near the city is now host to the Russian Air Force's 5th Air and Air Defence Forces Army's 999th Air Base positioned in Kyrgyzstan in response to the United States presence at Manas Air Base. The Kant airbase is also a structural subdivision of the Collective Security Treaty Organization (CSTO).

In February 2012, Kyrgyz President Almazbek Atambayev called for the Kant base to be closed, saying neither Russia nor Kyrgyzstan needs it. In May, Col. Gen. Alexander Zelin of the Russian Air Force declared his country had no plan to withdraw from the town of Kant, adding that the base’s organizational and personnel structure will remain as is. Later in August, Russia obtained a prolongation period from Kyrgyzstan, allowing Russian military sites to remain for 15 more years after the expiration of the current contract in 2017.

== Sister city ==
- Joppatowne, United States. In April 2011, Joppatowne, Maryland and Kant officially became sister cities. This cooperation between Kant and Joppatowne was initiated by the official bodies of both cities. Similarities are in their respective locations below the capitals.
- Vidnoye, Russia
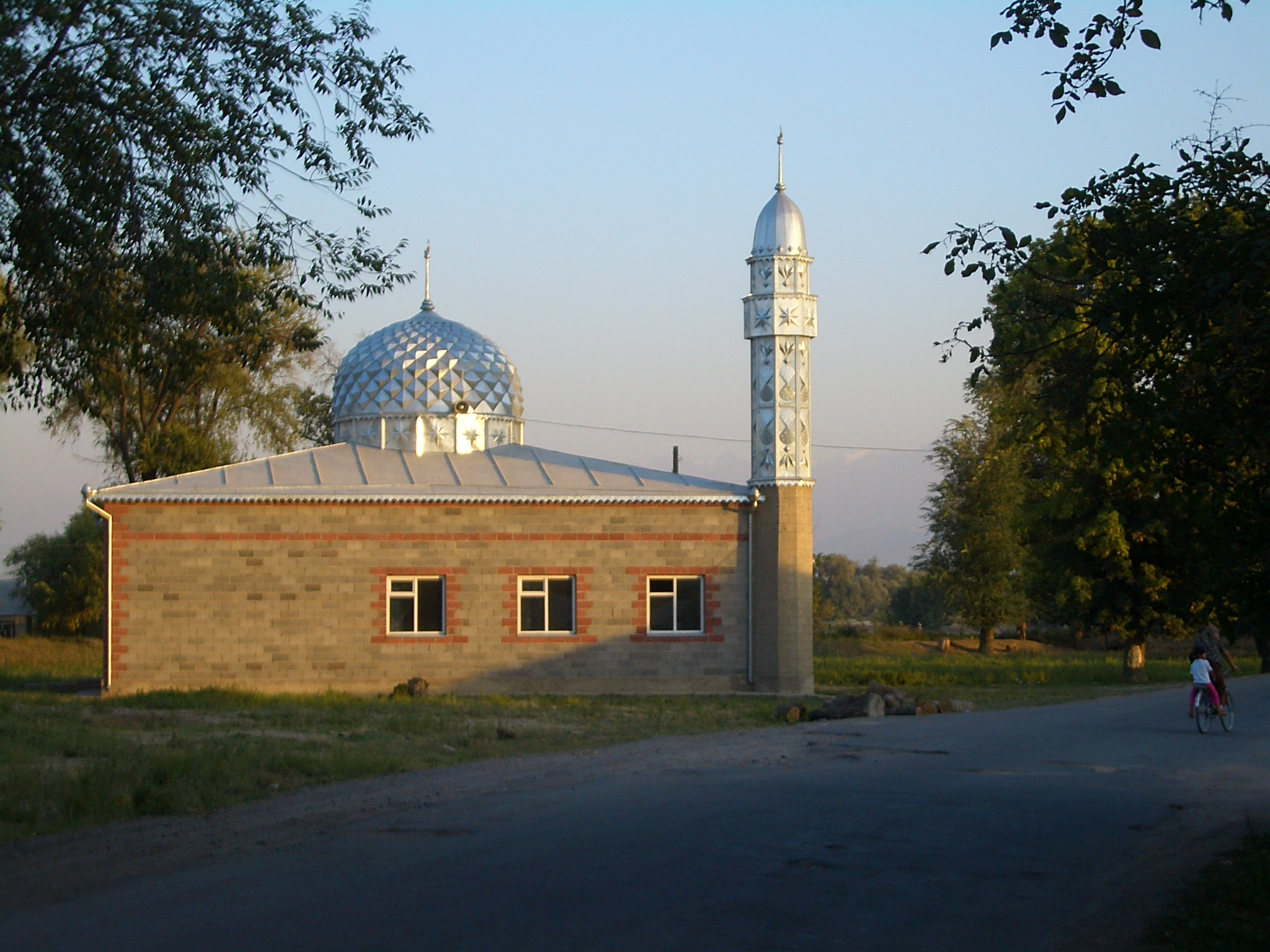
The mosque in Pervomayskoe village, north of Kant

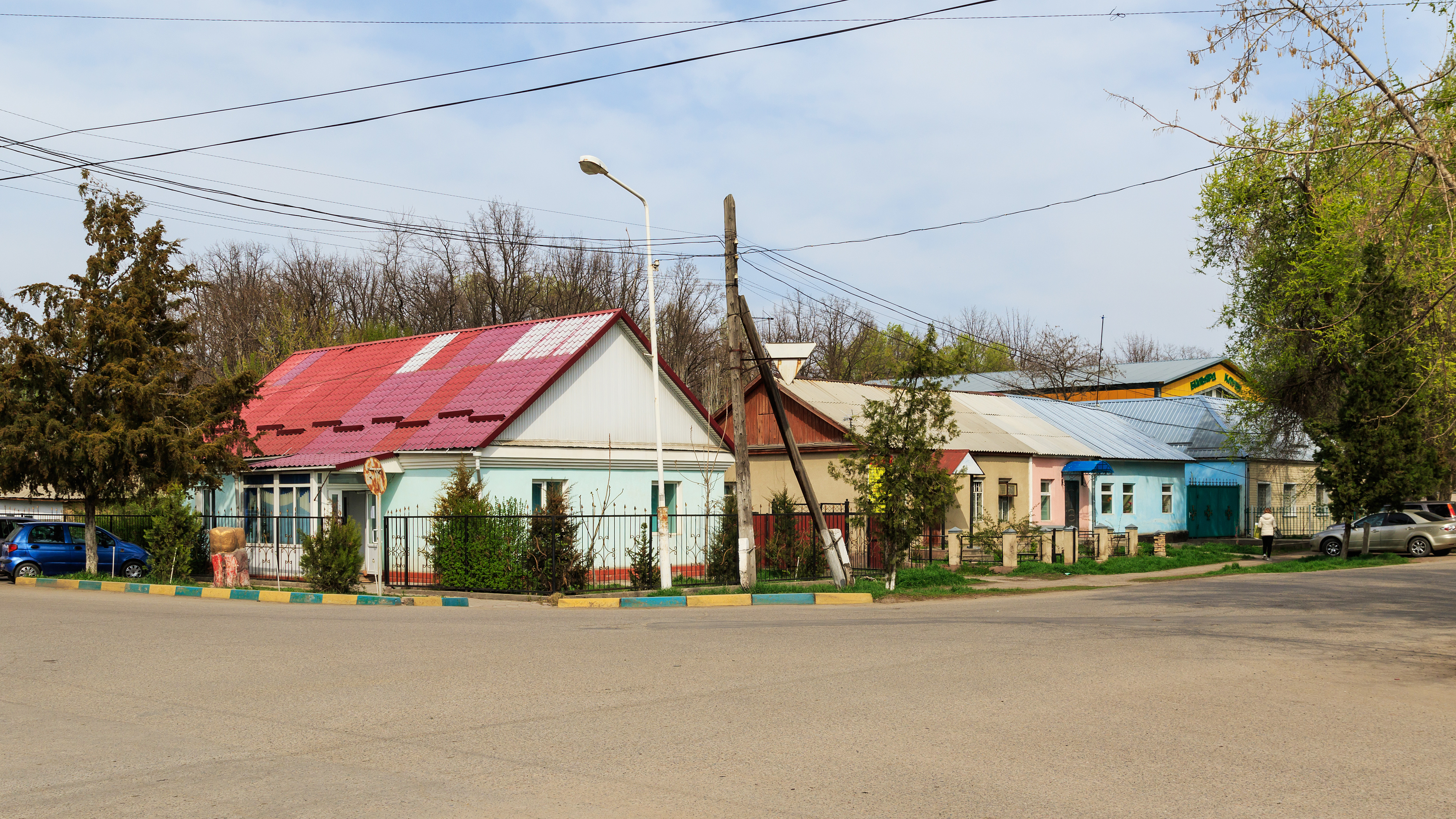
City center

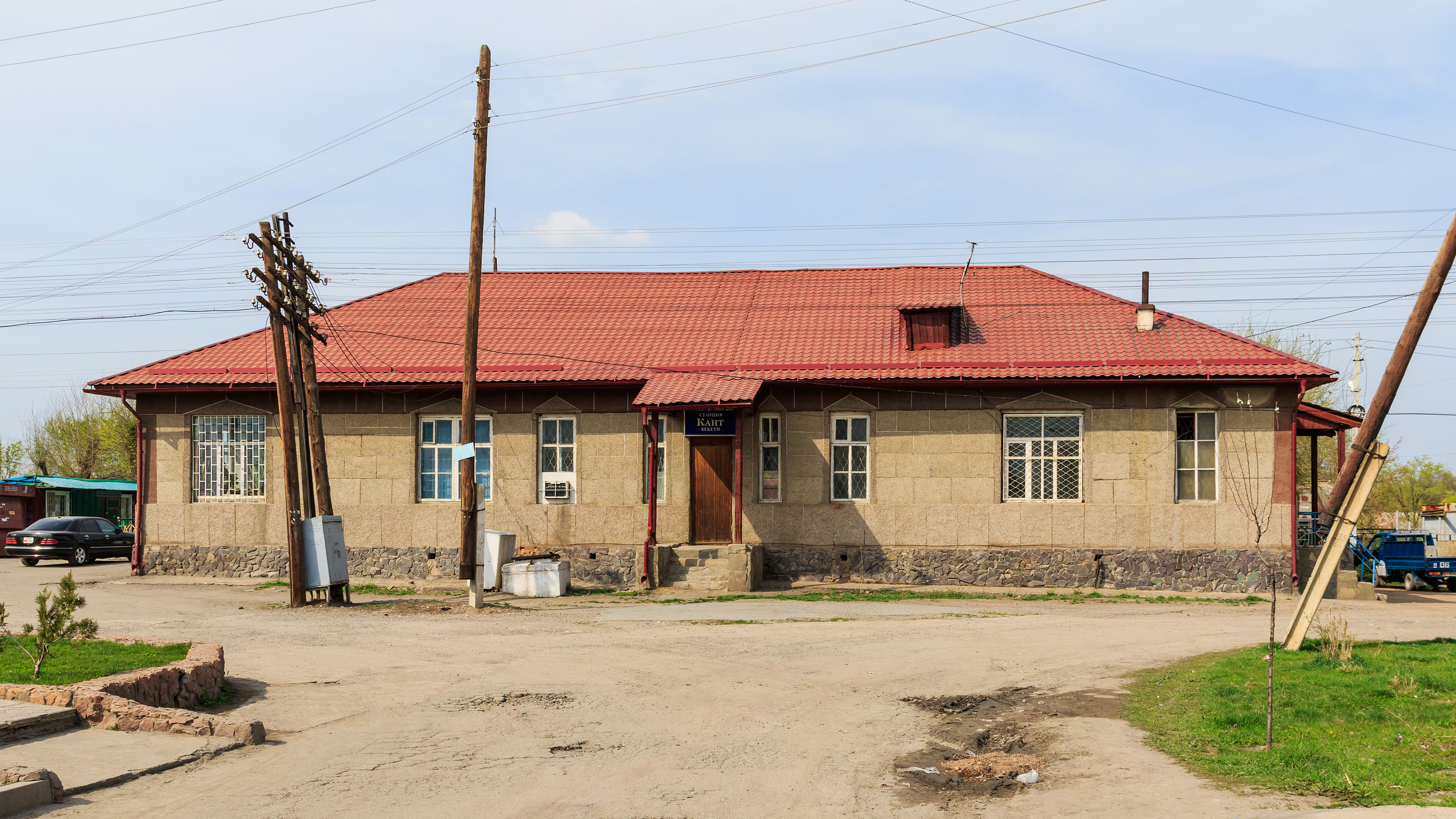
Railway station

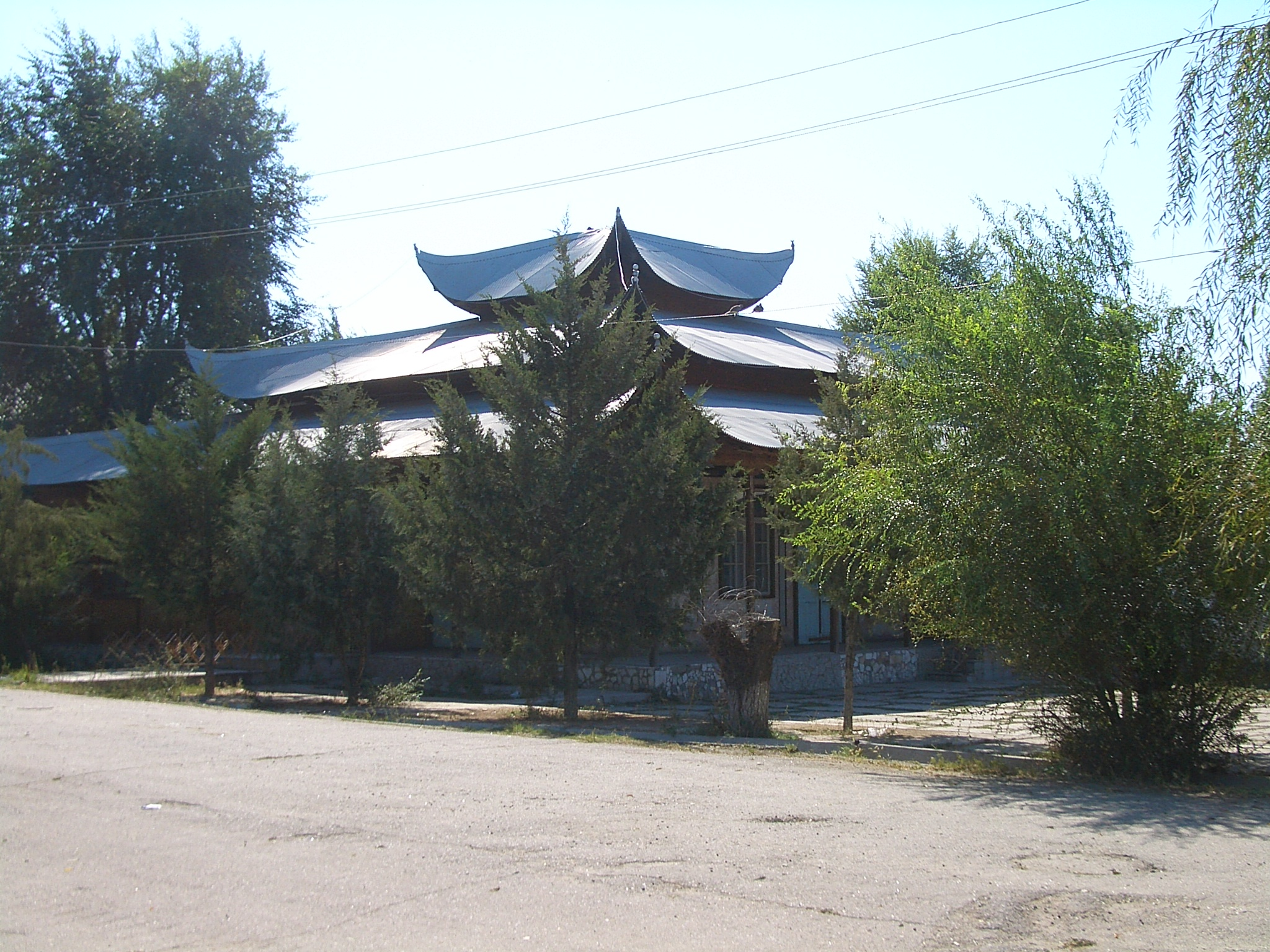
In Milianfan village

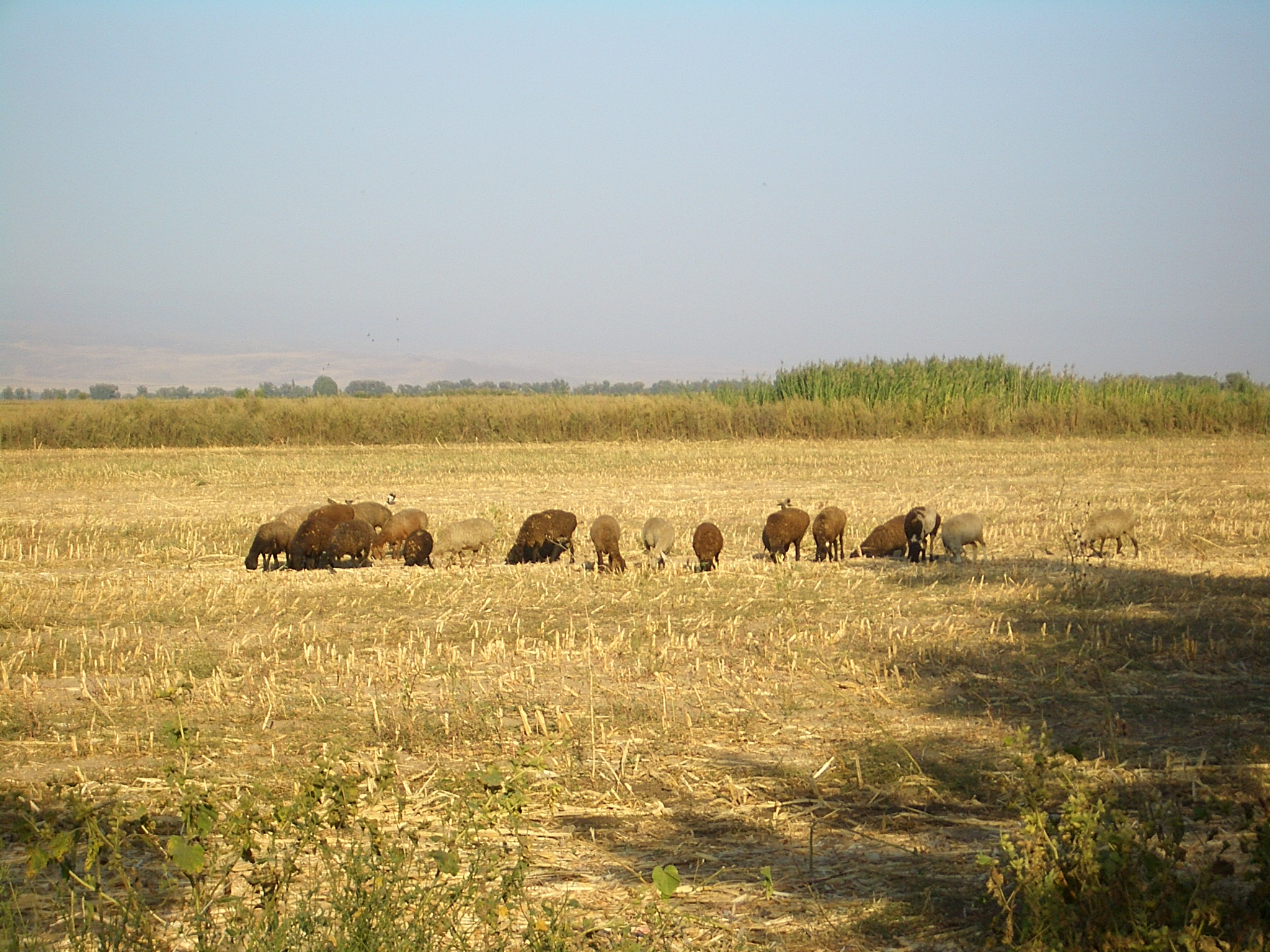
In the country
